= Galway–Limerick hurling rivalry =

Hurling rivalry between two Irish county teams

Galway-Limerick
- Location: County Galway; County Limerick
- Teams: Galway; Limerick
- First meeting: 3 December 1911; Limerick 8-1 - 2-0 Galway; 1911 All-Ireland semi-final
- Latest meeting: 19 July 2026; Limerick 1-29 - 1-18 Galway; 2026 All-Ireland final

Statistics
- Total meetings: 16
- All-time series: Championship: Limerick 11-4 Galway (1 draw)
- Largest victory: 3 December 1911; Limerick 8-1 - 2-0 Galway; 1911 All-Ireland semi-final

The Galway–Limerick rivalry is a hurling rivalry between Irish county teams Galway and Limerick, who first played each other in 1911. The fixture has been an irregular one due to both teams playing in separate provinces. Galway's home ground is Pearse Stadium and Limerick's home ground is the Gaelic Grounds, however, the majority of their championship meetings have been held at neutral venues, usually Croke Park.

While Limerick have enjoyed sporadic periods of dominance going back to the early years of the championship, Galway enjoyed their own successful period during the 1980s. The two teams have won a combined total of eleven All-Ireland Senior Hurling Championship titles.

As of 2026, Galway and Limerick have met 16 times in the hurling championship with Limerick recording eleven victories to Galway's four. There has been one drawn game between the two teams.

== History ==
=== 1911: Inaugural clash ===
The very first Galway-Limerick clash took place on 3 December 1911 in the All-Ireland semi-final. Galway were completely underprepared for the game, which Limerick won by 8-1 to 2-0.

=== 1921-1923: Honours even ===
On 25 June 1922 Galway and Limerick clashed for the first time in over a decade in what was the 1921 All-Ireland semi-final. Limerick's ability to score goals was they key as they ran out 6-0 to 2-2 winners.

In 1923 the political realities of the era affected the championship. Galway and Limerick qualified for the All-Ireland final, however, Limerick refused to play the game until all Civil War prisoners were released. They were initially disqualified and the title awarded to Galway, however, the game eventually took place on 14 September 1924. Mick Gill’s new tactic of lobbing the sliotar into the square paid dividends as Galway scored seven goals over the hour. A 7-3 to 4-5 victory gave Galway an historic first All-Ireland title while it marked the end of the road for the great Limerick team of the era.

=== 1934-1940: Limerick's greatest era ===
St. Cronan's Park in Roscrea was the venue for Galway's All-Ireland semi-final clash with Limerick on 5 August 1934. Limerick, the defeated All-Ireland finalists of the previous year, easily accounted for the opposition on a score line of 4-4 to 2-4.

Galway faced Limerick in an All-Ireland semi-final once again on 11 August 1940. By this stage Limerick were regarded as one of the teams of the decade having won two All-Ireland titles from four consecutive appearances between 1933 and 1936. Limerick made no mistake and recorded a 3-6 to 0-5 victory. The Galway players walked off the pitch with fifteen minutes left as they were not impressed with the rough tactics of their opponents.

=== 1962-1963: Unique provincial clashes ===
Galway and Limerick's next championship clash was on 27 May 1962 in a Munster quarter-final. Galway, who had faced no opposition in their own province for many years, were admitted to Munster in 1959. Having only won one game in the previous three seasons, the odds were stacked against the Westerners. Limerick made no mistake and recorded a 2-13 to 2-7 victory.

A year later on 9 June 1963, Galway faced Limerick in a Munster semi-final at Cusack Park. Limerick's top scorer, Tom McGarry, bagged 1-1 to help the Treaty men to a 3-9 to 2-7 victory.

=== 1980-1981: Galway supremacy ===
A mhuintir na Gaillimhe, tar éis seacht bliain
agus caoga, tá Craobh na hÉireann ar ais i
nGaillimh. Is iontach an lá innui a bheith mar
Gaillimhach. Ta daoine anois i nGaillimh agus
tá gliondar ina gcroi. Ach freisin caithimíd
caoimhniú ar daoine i Sasana, i Meiriceá, ar
fud na tíre agus tá siad ag caoineadh anois
láthair...People of Galway, we love you!

— Joe Connolly's acceptance speech
following the 1980 All-Ireland final.

On 7 September 1980, Galway and Limerick clashed for the first in seventeen years. It was also their first All-Ireland final meeting since 1923. Early goals by Bernie Forde and P.J. Molloy gave Galway a 2-1 to no score lead after just ten minutes and helped them to a 2-7 to 1-5 lead at the interval. Éamonn Cregan single-handedly launched the Limerick counter-attack in the second-half. Over the course of the game he scored 2-7, including an overhead goal and a point in which he showed the sliotar to full-back Conor Hayes and nonchalantly drove the ball over the bar. It was not enough to stem the tide and Galway went on to win the game by 2-15 to 3-9. It was the county’s first All-Ireland title since 1923 and the celebrations surpassed anything ever seen in Croke Park. It took captain Joe Connolly ten minutes to reach the rostrum in the Hogan Stand to collect the Liam MacCarthy Cup, however, once there he delivered one of the most famous acceptance speeches of all-time.

Just under a year later on 2 August 1981, Galway and Limerick renewed their rivalry in an All-Ireland semi-final clash. In a low-scoring game Éamonn Cregan top scored for Limerick with 0-5. In a game described in the Irish Times as "turbulent", a draw was seen as a fair result as Galway finished with 0-11 t0 Limerick's 1-8.

The replay two weeks later on 16 August 1981 was a much more free-flowing game. The Connolly brothers, Joe and John, combined to a score 3-9 between for Galway. Éamonn Cregan was once again Limerick's scorer-in-chief as he bagged 1-5. Brian Carroll scored a second goal for Limerick, however, it couldn't halt Galway's momentum. A 4-16 to 2-17 victory sent the Westerners into a third successive All-Ireland final.

=== 2005: Most recent meeting ===
The first championship meeting in almost a quarter of a century took place at the Gaelic Grounds on 9 July 2005 in a third ground qualifier group game. The opening fifteen minutes proved a nightmare for Limerick debutante Michael Clifford who was given a roasting by Damien Hayes. Galway, thanks to Ger Farragher and Hayes, led 0-6 to 0-2 before Hayes capitalised on a weak clearance by goalkeeper Timmy Houlihan to return the ball to the net. Galway built up a lead of 1-7 to 0-3 but then slackened off to allow Ollie and Niall Moran and Pat Kirby to give Limerick some hope at the break when they trailed 1-9 to 0-6. It was a different Limerick at the start of the second half and inside three minutes they had Galway reeling as they stole ahead 2-7 to 1-9. As the game drew to a close Limerick made championship history, not because of what they did, but because of what they were trying to do. They found themselves in the never-before-seen championship situation whereby not even a draw would save their day. With excitement at fever pitch, both teams exchanged points and were still level 1-17 to 2-14 before Farragher sent over the crucial point for a Galway win.

=== 2018: Limerick's First All-Ireland Final Victory Against Galway ===
Limerick won their first match against Galway in an All Ireland final at the 2018 final, ending their 45-year wait for the Liam MacCarthy trophy.

== All time results ==
=== Legend ===
Limerick win
Galway win
Draw

=== Senior ===
No.	Date	Winners	Score	Runners-up	Venue	Competition
1.	3 December 1911	Limerick (1)	8-1 - 2-0	Galway	O'Moore Park	All-Ireland semi-final
2.	25 June 1922	Limerick (2)	6-0 - 2-2	Galway	Markets Field	All-Ireland semi-final
3.	14 September 1923	Galway (1)	7-3 - 4-5	Limerick	Croke Park	All-Ireland final
4.	5 August 1934	Limerick (3)	4-4 - 2-4	Galway	St. Cronan's Park	All-Ireland semi-final
5.	11 August 1940	Limerick (4)	3-6 - 0-5	Galway	Cusack Park	All-Ireland semi-final
6.	27 May 1962	Limerick (5)	2-13 - 2-7	Galway	Cusack Park	Munster quarter-final
7.	8 June 1963	Limerick (6)	3-9 - 2-7	Galway	Cusack Park	Munster quarter-final
8.	7 September 1980	Galway (2)	2-15 - 3-9	Limerick	Croke Park	All-Ireland final
9.	2 August 1981	Galway	1-8 - 0-11	Limerick	Croke Park	All-Ireland semi-final
10.	16 August 1981	Galway (3)	4-16 - 2-17	Limerick	Croke Park	All-Ireland semi-final replay
11.	9 July 2005	Galway (4)	1-18 - 2-14	Limerick	Gaelic Grounds	All-Ireland qualifier
12.	19 August 2018	Limerick (7)	3-16 - 2-18	Galway	Croke Park	All-Ireland final
13.	19 August 2020	Limerick (8)	0-27 - 0-24	Galway	Croke Park	All-Ireland semi-final
14.	3 July 2022	Limerick (9)	0-27 - 1-21	Galway	Croke Park	All-Ireland semi-final
15.	8 July 2023	Limerick (10)	2-24 - 1-18	Galway	Croke Park	All-Ireland semi-final
16.	19 July 2026	Limerick (11)	1-29 - 1-18	Galway	Croke Park	All-Ireland final

=== Under-21 ===
No.	Date	Winners	Score	Runners-up	Venue	Competition
1.	16 August 1981	Limerick (1)	2-6 - 2-1	Galway	Cusack Park	All-Ireland semi-final
2.	21 June 1987	Limerick (2)	2-15 - 3-6	Galway	Cusack Park (Ennis)	All-Ireland final
3.	17 September 2000	Limerick (3)	1-13 - 0-13	Galway	Semple Stadium	All-Ireland final
4.	25 August 2001	Limerick (4)	1-13 - 2-5	Galway	Cusack Park	All-Ireland semi-final
5.	15 September 2002	Limerick (5)	3-17 - 0-8	Galway	Semple Stadium	All-Ireland final
6.	20 August 2011	Galway (1)	0-22 - 2-14	Limerick	Semple Stadium	All-Ireland semi-final
7.	19 August 2017	Limerick (6)	2-23 - 2-19	Galway	Semple Stadium	All-Ireland semi-final

=== Minor ===
No.	Date	Winners	Score	Runners-up	Venue	Competition
1.	11 August 1940	Limerick (1)	5-6 - 1-2	Galway	Cusack Park	All-Ireland semi-final
2.	7 September 1958	Limerick (2)	5-8 - 3-10	Galway	Croke Park	All-Ireland final
3.	17 May 1959	Limerick (3)	4-11 - 4-4	Galway	Croke Park	Munster quarter-final
4.	27 May 1962	Limerick (4)	8-12 - 7-2	Galway	Cusack Park	Munster quarter-final
5.	12 May 1963	Limerick (5)	2-11 - 4-4	Galway	Gaelic Grounds	Munster quarter-final
6.	9 July 1967	Limerick (6)	4-6 - 2-3	Galway	Cusack Park	Munster semi-final
7.	21 July 2000	Galway (1)	0-23 - 1-7	Limerick	Cusack Park	All-Ireland quarter-final
8.	11 September 2005	Galway (2)	3-13 - 0-17	Limerick	Croke Park	All-Ireland final
9.	18 August 2013	Galway (3)	0-23 - 0-20	Limerick	Croke Park	All-Ireland semi-final
10.	17 August 2014	Limerick (7)	1-27 - 2-9	Galway	Croke Park	All-Ireland semi-final
11.	26 July 2015	Galway (4)	1-14 - 0-13	Limerick	Semple Stadium	All-Ireland quarter-final
