= 2002 All-Ireland Under-21 Hurling Championship =

All-Ireland Under-21 Hurling Championship 2002
Championship Details
- Dates: 7 June – 15 September 2002
- Teams: 16

All Ireland Champions
- Winners: Limerick (4th win)
- Captain: Peter Lawlor
- Manager: Dave Keane

All Ireland Runners-up
- Runners-up: Galway
- Captain: Damien Hayes

Provincial Champions
- Munster: Limerick
- Leinster: Wexford
- Ulster: Antrim
- Connacht: Not Played

Championship Statistics
- Matches Played: 15
- Total Goals: 42 (2.8 per game)
- Total Points: 373 (24.86 per game)

The 2002 All-Ireland Under-21 Hurling Championship was the 39th staging of the All-Ireland championship since its establishment in 1964. The championship began 7 June and ended on 15 September.

Limerick were the defending champions and retained their title for a third successive year after defeating Galway by 3-17 to 0-8 in the final.

== Teams ==
=== Team summaries ===
Team	Colours	Sponsor	Most recent success	
Team	Colours	Sponsor	All-Ireland	Provincial
Antrim	Saffron and white			
Carlow	Red, green and yellow	Stone Developments		
Clare	Saffron and blue	Vodafone		
Cork	Red and white	O2	1998	1998
Derry	White and red	open+direct		1997
Down	Red and black	Canal Court Hotel		1990
Dublin	Blue and navy	Arnotts		1972
Galway	Maroon and white	Supermacs	1996	1996
Kerry	Green and gold	Kerry Group		
Kilkenny	Black and amber	Avonmore plc	1999	1999
Laois	Blue and white	Meadow Meats		1983
Limerick	Green and white	Red Cow Moran Hotel	2001	2001
Offaly	Green, white and gold	Carroll Meats		2000
Tipperary	Blue and gold	enfer	1995	1999
Waterford	White and blue	Gain Feeds	1992	1994
Wexford	Purple and gold	Wexford Creamery	1965	2001

== Results ==
=== Leinster Under-21 Hurling Championship ===
Quarter-finals

12 June 2002 Quarter-final	Carlow	0-12 - 3-18	Wexford	Dr. Cullen Park, Carlow
	B Lawler 0-6, P Kehoe 0-2, K English 0-2, P Coady 0-1, S Smithers 0-1.	Report	B Lambert (0-10, 4 frees); D Mythen (1-3), W Doran (1-1), E Sludds (1-0), D Lyng (0-2); R Barry (0-1), MJ Furlong (0-1).	Referee: A Stapleton (Laois)

25 June 2002 Quarter-final	Offaly	4-14 - 1-7	Laois	St. Brendan's Park, Birr
	R Hanniffy (2-3), M Cordial (2-2); B Carroll (0-3), P Teehan (0-2), D Tanner (0-1), S Brown (0-1); K Kelly (0-1), D Murray (0-1).	Report	F Keenan (1-3), E Jackman (0-2), J Phelan (0-1, 65), O Bergin (0-1).	Referee: J Kelly (Wexford)

Semi-finals

27 June 2002 Semi-final	Kilkenny	0-15 - 1-13	Wexford	Nowlan Park, Kilkenny
	B Dowling (0-6), E Walsh (0-3), G Byrne (0-3); P Doheny (0-1), A Fogarty (0-1), M Grace (0-1).	Report	B Lambert (0-7), R Jacob (1-3), D Mythen (0-2), D Lyng (0-1).	Referee: E Morris (Dublin)

17 July 2002 Semi-final	Dublin	3-12 - 2-6	Offaly	O'Moore Park, Portlaoise
	D O'Callaghan 1-7, S O'Neill, F Chambers 1-0 each, C Keaney 0-3, D O'Reilly, B O'Brien 0-1 each.		D Murray 1-2, R Hanniffy 1-1, B O'Meara, P Teehan, B Carroll 0-1 each.

Final

30 July 2002 Final	Wexford	1-15 - 0-15 (aet)	Dublin	O'Moore Park, Portlaoise
	B Lambert 1-8 (5f); R Jacob 0-3; D Mythen 0-2; E Quigley, MJ Furlong 0-1 each.	Report	D O'Callaghan 0-6 (4f); C Keaney 0-4 (1 '65', 2f); S O'Shea, Paul Murray 0-2 each; D O'Reilly 0-1.	Referee: J Guinan (Kilkenny)

=== Munster Under-21 Hurling Championship ===
Quarter-finals

7 June 2002 Quarter-final	Tipperary	w/o - scr.	Kerry

7 June 2002 Quarter-final	Limerick	1-12 - 1-9	Clare	Gaelic Grounds, Limerick
	M Keane 0-4, K Tobin 1-0, C Fitzgerald 0-3, E Foley 0-2, N Moran 0-1, A O'Shaughnessy 0-1, P Kirby 0-1.		S O'Neill 1-0, D Quinn 0-3, D McMahon 0-2, T Griffin 0-1, S Maloney 0-1, D Kennedy 0-1.	Referee: M Wadding (Waterford)

Semi-finals

9 July 2002 Semi-final	Limerick	1-15 - 1-14	Cork	Gaelic Grounds, Limerick
	M Keane (0-8), A O'Shaughnessy (1-1), N Moran (0-2), E Foley (0-2); C Fitzgerald (0-1), K Tobin (0-1).	Report	S O hAilpin (1-1), J Quinlan (0-3), N McCarthy (0-3), J Egan (0-2), Kieran Murphy (0-1); E Collins (0-1), G Callinan (0-1), T O'Leary (0-1), R Doherty (0-1).	Referee: S McMahon (Clare)

10 July 2002 Semi-final	Tipperary	2-14 - 1-11	Waterford	Semple Stadium, Thurles
	E Kelly 0-5, L Corbett 1-2, E Brislane 1-1, E Ryan 0-3, M Butler 0-2, D Shelley 0-1.		E Kelly 0-9, J Mullane 1-1, S Barron 0-1.

Finals

8 August 2002 Final	Tipperary	3-9 - 2-12	Limerick	Semple Stadium, Thurles
	E Kelly 0-8 (0-7 frees), L Corbett 1-2, D Shelley 1-1, E Ryan 0-1.	Report	N Moran, J O’Brien 1-1 each, M Keane (frees), A O’Shaughnessy 0-3 each, E Foley 1-0 (pen), C Fitzgerald 0-1.	Referee: M Wadding (Waterford)

21 August 2002 Final replay	Tipperary	2-14 - 1-20	Limerick	Semple Stadium, Thurles
	E Kelly 0-6 (0-5 frees); E Brislane 0-3; M Butler, J O’Brien 1-0 each; D Shelley 0-2; P Morrissey, L Corbett, M Bourke 0-1 each.	Report	M Keane 0-7 (0-6 frees); K Tobin, E Foley (0-2 frees) 0-4 each; A O’Shaughnessy 1-0; P Kirby, C Fitzgerald 0-2 each; N Moran 0-1.	Referee: S McMahon (Clare)

=== Ulster Under-21 Hurling Championship ===
Semi-final

6 July 2002 Semi-final	Down	1-9 - 0-7	Derry	McKenna Park, Ballycran
	P Braniff (1-5), B McGourty (0-2), S Johnston (0-1), O Clarke (0-1).	Report	D McGill (0-4), K Hinphey (0-1); A McCloskey (0-1), S McBride (0-1).	Referee: T McIntyre (Antrim)

Final

21 July 2002 Final	Antrim	2-13 - 0-6	Down	Casement Park, Belfast
	G Bell 2-0, C Hernon 0-6, D McAuley 0-3, S Delargy 0-2, S McFadden 0-1, B Quinn 0-1.		P Braniff 0-4, G Clarke 0-1, F Conway 0-1.	Referee: G Devlin (Armagh)

=== All-Ireland Under-21 Hurling Championship ===
Semi-finals

24 August 2002 Semi-final	Galway	1-20 - 1-10	Wexford	Semple Stadium, Thurles
	G Farragher 0-13 (0-10 frees, 0-1 65); A Cullinane 1-1; M Coughlan 0-3; R Murray 0-2; D Hayes 0-1.	Report	B Lambert 0-7 (0-6 frees, 0-1 65); R Jacob 1-0; MJ Furlong, E Quigley, S O'Neill 0-1 each.	Referee: G Harrington (Cork)

25 August 2002 Semi-final	Limerick	2-20 - 2-6	Antrim	Parnell Park, Dublin
	M Keane 1-9, E Foley 1-3, K Tobin 0-3, A O'Shaughnessy 0-2, N Moran 0-1, P Tobin 0-1 C Fitzgerald 0-1.	Report	M McClements 1-0, S Delargy 1-0, K Stewart 0-2, D McAuley 0-1.	Referee: É Morris (Dublin)

Final

15 September 2002 Final	Limerick	3-17 - 0-8	Galway	Semple Stadium, Thurles
	A O'Shaughnessy 2-2; M Keane 1-6 (0-5 frees); P Kirby 0-3 (0-2 frees); J O'Brien, P Lawlor (0-1 free) 0-2 each; C Fitzgerald, D Reale 0-1 each.	Report	G Farragher 0-5 (0-4 frees); R Murray 0-2; JP O'Connell 0-1.	Referee: D Murphy (Wexford)

== Championship statistics ==
=== Top scorers ===
Top scorers overall

Rank	Player	Club	Tally	Total	Matches	Average
1	Mark Keane	Limerick	2-37	43	6	7.16
2	Barry Lambert	Wexford	1-32	35	4	8.75
3	Andrew O'Shaughnessy	Limerick	4-09	21	6	3.50
4	Eoin Kelly	Tipperary	0-19	19	3	6.33
5	Ger Farragher	Limerick	0-18	18	2	9.00
6	David O'Callaghan	Dublin	1-13	16	2	8.00
7	Eoin Foley	Limerick	2-09	15	6	2.50
8	Rory Hanniffy	Offaly	3-04	13	2	6.50
9	Rory Jacob	Wexford	2-06	12	4	3.00
9	Paul Braniff	Down	1-09	12	2	6.00

Top scorers in a single game

Rank	Player	Club	Tally	Total	Opposition
1	Ger Farragher	Galway	0-13	13	Wexford
2	Mark Keane	Limerick	1-09	12	Antrim
3	Barry Lambert	Wexford	1-08	11	Dublin
4	David O'Callaghan	Dublin	1-07	10	Offaly
4	Barry Lambert	Wexford	0-10	10	Carlow
5	Barry Lambert	Wexford	0-10	10	Carlow
6	Rory Hanniffy	Offaly	2-03	9	Laois
6	Mark Keane	Limerick	1-06	9	Galway
6	Eoin Kelly	Waterford	0-09	9	Tipperary
7	Michael Cordial	Offaly	2-02	8	Laois
7	Andrew O'Shaughnessy	Limerick	2-02	8	Galway
7	Paul Braniff	Down	1-05	8	Derry
7	Mark Keane	Limerick	0-08	8	Cork
7	Eoin Kelly	Tipperary	0-08	8	Waterford

=== Miscellaneous ===
- Limerick become the first team since Tipperary in 1981 to win three successive All-Ireland titles.
