= Eugene Mulcahy =

Irish hurler

Personal information
- Native name: Eoghan Ó Maolchathaigh (Irish)
- Born: 1981 (age 44–45) Knockainey, County Limerick, Ireland
- Occupation: Quantity surveyor

Sport
- Sport: Hurling
- Position: Left corner-back
Club
- Years: Club
- Knockainey
Club titles
- Limerick titles: 0
College
- Years: College
- Limerick Institute of Technology
College titles
- Fitzgibbon titles: 0
Inter-county
- Years: County
- 2003-2004: Limerick
Inter-county titles
- Munster titles: 0
- All-Irelands: 0
- NHL: 0
- All Stars: 0

Eugene Mulcahy (born 1981) is an Irish former hurler. At club level, he played with Knockainey and at inter-county level with the Limerick senior hurling team.

== Career ==
Mulcahy played hurling at all grades as a student at John the Baptist Community School in Hospital. He later studied at Limerick Institute of Technology and lined out with LIT in the Fitzgibbon Cup.

At club level, Mulcahy first played for Knockainey as a dual player in the juvenile and underage grades, before progressing to adult level. He was at midfield when Knockainey claimed the Limerick IHC title in 2001 after a 2–13 to 1–09 win over Mungret in a final replay.

At inter-county level, Mulcahy first played for Limerick as a member of the minor team in 1999. He subsequently progressed to the under-21 team and won three consecutive All-Ireland U21HC medals between 2000 and 2002. Mulcahy made his senior team debut in 2003. He made a number of appearances before leaving the panel a year later.

== Honours ==
Knockainey

- Limerick Intermediate Hurling Championship: 2001

Limerick

- All-Ireland Under-21 Hurling Championship: 2000, 2001, 2002
- Munster Under-21 Hurling Championship: 2000, 2001 (c), 2002
