= 2002 National Hurling League =

71st season of the National Hurling League

League details
- Dates: 9 March – 11 May 2002
- Teams: 33

League champions
- Winners: Kilkenny (10th win)
- Captain: Andy Comerford
- Manager: Brian Cody

League runners-up
- Runners-up: Cork
- Captain: Wayne Sherlock
- Manager: Bertie Óg Murphy

Other division winners
- Division 2: Laois
- Division 3: Longford
- Division 4: Mayo

The 2002 National Hurling League, known for sponsorship reasons as the Allianz National Hurling League, was the 71st edition of the National Hurling League (NHL), an annual hurling competition for the GAA county teams. Kilkenny won the league, beating Cork in the final.

== Structure ==
There are 12 teams in Division 1, divided into 1A and 1B. Each team plays all the others once, either home or away. Teams earn one point for a draw and two for a win.

- The first-placed teams in 1A and 1B progress to the NHL semi-finals
- The second- and third-placed teams in 1A and 1B progress to the quarter-finals
- The fifth- and sixth-placed teams in 1A and 1B go into a relegation playoff.

There are 10 teams in Division 2, split into 2A and 2B.

- The first- and second-placed teams in 2A and 2B progress to the Division 2 semi-finals
- The fourth- and fifth-placed teams in 2A and 2B go into a relegation playoff.

There are 6 teams in Division 3. The top two play each other in the final, with the winner promoted. The bottom two teams play a relegation playoff.

There are 5 teams in Division 4. The top two play each other in the final, with the winner promoted.

== Division 1 ==
=== Division 1A ===
Pos	Team	Pld	W	D	L	F	A	Diff	Pts	Notes
1	Kilkenny	5	4	0	1	9-75	1-56	43	8	Division 1 champions
2	Galway	5	4	0	1	6-86	6-61	25	8	
3	Clare	5	3	0	2	6-86	7-59	24	6	
4	Waterford	5	2	0	3	6-69	3-68	10	4	
5	Dublin	5	2	0	3	6-56	6-79	-23	4	
6	Meath	5	0	0	5	4-42	14-91	-79	0	Relegated to Division 2

=== Group stage ===
25 February 2002 Round 1	Meath	1-8 - 4-24	Clare	Páirc Tailteann, Navan
	N Horan 0-6, M Cole 1-1, D Dorran 0-1.		T Carmody 1-4, D Forde 1-2, T Griffin 0-7, B Culbert 1-1, J O’Connor 0-4, A Quinn 1-0, N Gilligan 0-2, O Baker 0-2, C Lynch 0-1, C Plunkett 0-1.	Referee: T McIntyre (Antrim)

25 February 2002 Round 1	Kilkenny	1-12 - 0-12	Waterford	Nowlan Park, Kilkenny
	H Shefflin 0-4, J Hoyne 1-0, E Brennan 0-2, A Cummins 0-1, K Power 0-1, R Mullally 0-1, D Lyng 0-1, M Comerford 0-1, B Dowling 0-1.		P Flynn 0-8, T Browne 0-2, D Shanahan 0-1, E Murphy 0-1.	Referee: G Harrington (Cork)

9 March 2002 Round 2	Waterford	4-12 - 1-5	Meath	Fraher Field, Dungarvan
	P Flynn 2-1, M White 2-1, K McGrath 0-3, T Browne 0-2, A Moloney 0-2, D Bennett 0-2, E McGrath 0-1.		M Cole 1-0, N Horan 0-3, N Reilly 0-1, F McMahon 0-1.	Referee: D Kirwan (Cork)

10 March 2002 Round 2	Galway	0-15 - 0-9	Kilkenny	Duggan Park, Ballinasloe
	E Cloonan 0-6, K Broderick 0-2, D Hayes 0-2, F Forde 0-2, R Gantley 0-1, D Tierney 0-1, J Rabbitte 0-1.		H Shefflin 0-7, D Lyng 0-1, P Sheehan 0-1.	Referee: P Horan (Offaly)

10 March 2002 Round 2	Clare	0-18 - 2-7	Dublin	Cusack Park, Ennis
	T Griffin 0-4, D Forde 0-3, O Baker 0-2, J O’Connor 0-2, C Lynch 0-2, N Gilligan 0-2, T Carmody 0-1, J Considine 0-1, A Markham 0-1.		P Maguire 1-0, C Wilson 1-0, D Sweeney 0-3, D Curtin 0-2, C Keaney 0-1, S Martin 0-1.	Referee: J Sexton (Limerick)

18 March 2002 Round 3	Galway	1-17 - 1-16	Clare	Duggan Park, Ballinasloe
	E Cloonan 0-8, R Murray 0-3, R Gantley 0-3, O Fahy 1-1, D Tierney 0-1, K Broderick 0-1.		T Carmody 1-3, J O’Connor 0-5, S McMahon 0-2, T Griffin 0-2, O Baker 0-1, N Gilligan 0-1, A Markham 0-1, D Forde 0-1.	Referee: W Barrett (Tipperary)

18 March 2002 Round 3	Dublin	1-19 - 1-14	Waterford	Parnell Park, Dublin
	S Martin 0-5, D Curtin 0-5, G Ennis 1-1, C Keaney 0-3, D Sweeney 0-3, P Maguire 0-1, C Meehan 0-1.		K McGrath 1-5, P Flynn 0-3, M White 0-2, D Shanahan 0-2, D Bennett 0-1, P Queally 0-1.	Referee: D Murphy (Wexford)

18 March 2002 Round 3	Kilkenny	2-22 - 0-9	Meath	Nowlan Park, Kilkenny
	E Brennan 2-4, H Shefflin 0-5, M Comerford 0-3, B Dowling 0-2, P Tennyson 0-2, A Cummins 0-1, S Grehan 0-1, D Lyng 0-1, K Power 0-1, A Geoghegan 0-1, E Behan 0-1.		N Horan 0-7, J Canty 0-1, J McGuinness 0-1.	Referee: D Richardson (Limerick)

24 March 2002 Round 4	Meath	0-9 - 1-15	Dublin	Páirc Tailteann, Navan
	N Horan 0-4, J McGuinness 0-2, A O’Neill 0-1, M Cole 0-1, N Reilly 0-1.		D Curtin 0-9, S Martin 1-1, C Keaney 0-3, P Maguire 0-1, D Spain 0-1.	Referee: J Kelly (Wexford)

24 March 2002 Round 4	Clare	1-12 - 3-14	Kilkenny	Cusack Park, Ennis
	T Carmody 1-3, J O’Connor 0-3, D Forde 0-2, J Considine 0-2, T Griffin 0-1, S McMahon 0-1.		S Grehan 2-1, H Shefflin 0-6, E Brennan 1-2, M Kavanagh 0-1, D Lyng 0-1, J Hoyne 0-1, M Comerford 0-1, A Geoghegan 0-1.	Referee: D Kirwan (Cork)

24 March 2002 Round 4	Waterford	1-16 - 0-16	Galway	Walsh Park, Waterford
	K McGrath 0-8, P Flynn 1-4, E Kelly 0-1, T Browne 0-1, S Prendergast 0-1, D Bennett 0-1		R Gantley 0-4, M Kerins 0-2, F Forde 0-2, J Rabbitte 0-2, F Healy 0-2, D Tierney 0-1, D O’Brien 0-1, O Fahy 0-1, Niall Hayes 0-1.	Referee: S Roche (Tipperary)

30 March 2002 Round 1 refixture	Dublin	2-9 - 2-20	Galway	Parnell Park, Dublin
	S Martin 1-2, C Meehan 1-0, D Curtin 0-3, D Sweeney 0-2, D Spain 0-1, C Kearney 0-1.		M Kerins 1-1, F Forde 0-4, D Tierney 1-0, D Hayes 0-3, A Kerins 0-2, F Healy 0-2, R Murray 0-2, O Fahy 0-2, R Gantley 0-2, J Rabbitte 0-1, M Cullinane 0-1.	Referee: T McIntyre (Antrim)

7 April 2002 Round 5	Galway	3-18 - 2-11	Meath	Kenny Park, Athenry
	D Hayes 2-2, M Kerins 1-4, E Cloonan 0-6, F Healy 0-3, R Gantley 0-2, R Murray 0-1.		N Horan 1-6, N Reilly 1-1, J Donoghue 0-2, D Doran 0-1, C Sheridan 0-1.	Referee: J Sexton (Limerick)

7 April 2002 Round 5	Kilkenny	3-18 - 0-8	Dublin	Nowlan Park, Kilkenny
	M Comerford 1-4, E Brennan 0-7, H Shefflin 2-0, J Hoyne 0-2, B Dowling 0-2, M Kavanagh 0-1, P Tennyson 0-1, P Sheehan 0-1.		D Curtin 0-3, S O’Neill 0-1, P Maguire 0-1, D Sweeney 0-1, C Wilson 0-1, A de Paor 0-1.	Referee: B Kelly (Westmeath)

7 April 2002 Round 5	Clare	0-16 - 0-15	Waterford	Cusack Park, Ennis
	J O’Connor 0-5, J Reddan 0-2, S McMahon 0-2, T Carmody 0-2, A Quinn 0-1, C Lynch 0-1, T Griffin 0-1, A Markham 0-1, O Baker 0-1.		K McGrath 0-8, A Moloney 0-2, S Prendergast 0-2, P Flynn 0-2, J Mullane 0-1.	Referee: J McDonnell (Tipperary)

=== Division 1B Table ===
Pos	Team	Pld	W	D	L	F	A	Diff	Pts	Notes
1	Cork	5	4	0	1	6-90	5-60	33	8	Division 1 runners-up
2	Limerick	5	4	0	1	8-77	6-54	29	8	
3	Tipperary	5	3	0	2	10-83	9-54	35	6	
4	Wexford	5	3	0	2	10-73	8-71	8	6	
5	Offaly	5	2	0	3	9-61	9-76	-15	4	
6	Derry	5	0	0	5	6-37	12-104	-85	0	

=== Group stage ===
25 February 2002 Round 1	Limerick	0-9 - 0-11	Cork	Gaelic Grounds, Limerick
	P O’Grady 0-3, M Foley 0-3, S Lucey 0-2, E Foley 0-1.		A Browne 0-4, B O’Connor 0-2, J O’Connor 0-2, K Murphy 0-1, N Ronan 0-1, S McGrath 0-1.	Referee: B Kelly (Westmeath)

25 February 2002 Round 1	Wexford	2-20 - 3-4	Derry	Bellefield Park, Enniscorthy
	D Stamp 1-2, B Goff 0-5, M Jordan 0-4, L O’Gorman 1-0, A Fenlon 0-3, R McCarthy 0-2, D Fitzhenry 0-1, G Coleman 0-1, E Doyle 0-1, K Furlong 0-1.		J O’Dwyer 3-0, O Collins 0-3, R Kennedy 0-1.	Referee: P Aherne (Carlow)

9 March 2002 Round 2	Derry	0-9 - 1-16	Offaly	Lavey Sportfield, Lavey
	O Collins 0-6, D Magill 0-1, D McGrellis 0-1, J O’Dwyer 0-1.		G Oakley 1-1, J Dooley 0-4, D Murray 0-3, B Carroll 0-3, M O’Hara 0-3, B Murphy 0-2.	Referee: G Devlin (Armagh)

9 March 2002 Round 2	Cork	0-24 - 2-12	Wexford	Páirc Uí Chaoimh, Cork
	A Browne 0-7, J Deane 0-5, N McCarthy 0-3, J O’Connor 0-3, B O’Connor 0-2, S McGrath 0-2, A Cummins 0-1, T McCarthy 0-1.		M Jordan 2-1, B Lambert 0-6, D O’Brien 0-2, L O’Gorman 0-1, A Fenlon 0-1, L Murphy 0-1.	Referee: A Mac Suibhne (Dublin)

10 March 2002 Round 2	Tipperary	1-12 - 2-13	Limerick	Semple Stadium, Thurles
	E Kelly 0-6, E O’Neill 1-2, L Cahill 0-1, E Enright 0-1, M O’Leary 0-1, P Kelly 0-1.		M Keane 2-7, M Foley 0-3, S Lucey 0-1, B Begley 0-1, S O’Connor 0-1.	Referee: S McMahon (Clare)

16 March 2002 Round 3	Derry	1-12 - 1-24	Cork	Davitt Park, Swatragh
	O Collins 0-8, D Doherty 1-0, D Magill 0-1, R McCloskey 0-1, D McGrelis 0-1, G McGonigle 0-1.		J Deane 1-5, N Ronan 0-5, J O'Connor 0-4, S McGrath 0-3, A Cummins 0-2, E Collins 0-2, N McCarthy 0-1, P Ryan 0-1, T McCarthy 0-1.

18 March 2002 Round 3	Wexford	3-13 - 1-10	Tipperary	Wexford Park, Wexford
	L O’Gorman 1-4, D O’Brien 1-2, B Lambert 0-4, M Jordan 1-0, D Ruth 0-2, R Mallon 0-1.		J O’Brien 1-1, E Kelly 0-3, T Dunne 0-2, J Enright 0-2, L Cahill 0-1, E O’Neill 0-1.	Referee: P Neary (Kilkenny)

18 March 2002 Round 3	Offaly	2-10 - 1-18	Limerick	St. Brendan's Park, Birr
	J Dooley 0-7, J Ryan 1-1, D Murray 1-1, B Carroll 0-1,		M Keane 0-6, B Begley 1-0, J Butler 0-3, C Fitzgerald 0-2, S O’Connor 0-2, C Carey 0-2, M Foley 0-1, S Lucey 0-1, B Foley 0-1.	Referee: P Aherne (Carlow)

24 March 2002 Round 4	Wexford	1-12 - 2-16	Limerick	Wexford Park, Wexford
	B Lambert 0-6, L O’Gorman 1-0, A Fenlon 0-2, L Murphy 0-2, E Doyle 0-1, M Jordan 0-1.		P O’Grady 1-2, M Keane 0-5, C Fitzgerald 1-0, B Foley 0-3, M Foley 0-2, B Begley 0-2, P Lawlor 0-1, M O’Brien 0-1.	Referee: M Wadding (Waterford)

24 March 2002 Round 4	Cork	4-17 - 1-10	Offaly	Páirc Uí Chaoimh, Cork
	E Collins 3-1, J O’Connor 0-5, D O'Sullivan 1-0, J Deane 0-3, S McGrath 0-2, B O’Connor 0-2, A Cummins 0-2, T McCarthy 0-1, N Ronan 0-1.		J Dooley 0-6, R Hannify 1-1, J Ryan 0-2, J Brady 0-1.	Referee: S McMahon (Clare)

24 March 2002 Round 4	Tipperary	5-23 - 0-3	Derry	MacDonagh Park, Nenagh
	M O’Leary 2-4, J O’Brien 2-4, E Kelly 1-5, L Corbett 0-3, J Enright 0-3, T Dunne 0-1, N Morris 0-1, P Kelly 0-1, B O’Meara 0-1.		M Conway 0-1, Gregory Biggs 0-1, Gary Biggs 0-1.	Referee: E Morris (Dublin)

30 March 2002 Round 1 refixture	Offaly	3-8 - 2-21	Tipperary	St. Brendan's Park, Birr
	B Murphy 1-3, G Hanniffy 1-1, Brian Whelahan 1-0, J Dooley 0-3, B Carroll 0-1.		E Kelly 0-9, L Cahill 1-3, J O’Brien 1-2, T Dunne 0-4, J Carroll 0-2, B Dunne 0-1.	Referee: P Dunphy (Kilkenny)

7 April 2002 Round 5	Derry	2-9 - 3-21	Limerick	Lavey Sportsfield, Lavey
	M Collins 2-1, G McGonigle 0-4, O Collins 0-3, G Biggs 0-1.		M Keane 2-8, J Butler 0-4, S O’Connor 1-0, M Foley 0-2, C Fitzgerald 0-2, B Begley 0-2, B Foley 0-1, J Moran 0-1, P Carey 0-1.	Referee: J McClean (Antrim)

7 April 2002 Round 5	Offaly	2-17 - 2-16	Wexford	St. Brendan's Park, Birr
	J Dooley 0-7, R Hanniffy 1-2, B Murphy 1-0, B Carroll 0-3, G Hanniffy 0-2, N Claffey 0-1, Barry Whelehan 0-1, Brian Whelehan 0-1.		B Lambert 1-7, B Goff 1-2, R McCarthy 0-3, A Fenlon 0-2, D Ruth 0-1, E Doyle 0-1.	Referee: A Mac Suibhne (Dublin)

7 April 2002 Round 5	Cork	1-14 - 1-17	Tipperary	Páirc Uí Chaoimh, Cork
	J Deane 1-3, E Collins 0-3, N McCarthy 0-2, A Browne 0-2, S McGrath 0-2, B O’Connor 0-2.		E O’Neill 1-2, M O’Leary 0-4, E Kelly 0-4, T Dunne 0-2, L Cahill 0-2, N Morris 0-1, J Enright 0-1, J O’Brien 0-1.	Referee: P Ahern (Carlow)

=== Relegation play-offs ===
Semi-finals

14 April 2002 Semi-final	Offaly	0-16 - 0-14	Meath	O'Connor Park, Tullamore
	B Whelehan 0-6, S Brown 0-5, B Murphy 0-2, M O’Hara 0-1, R Hannify 0-1, B Carroll 0-1.		N Horan 0-6, T Reilly 0-3, C Sheridan 0-2, D Dorran 0-1, N Reilly 0-1, M Cole 0-1.	Referee: G Devlin (Armagh)

14 April 2002 Semi-final	Dublin	2-16 - 5-6	Derry	Brewster Park, Enniskillen
	C Keaney 0-6, K Flynn 1-2, G Ennis 1-2, T McGrane 0-2, L Ryan 0-1, R Kennedy 0-1, S Martin 0-1, P Maguire 0-1.		M Collins 4-1, O Collins 1-1, G McGonigle 0-4.	Referee: D Kirwan (Cork)

Final

21 April 2002 Final	Meath	2-12 - 2-16	Derry	Brewster Park, Enniskillen
	N Horan 1-6, J O’Toole 1-0, T Reilly 0-2, D Dorran 0-1, C Sheridan 0-1, N Reilly 0-1, M Cole 0-1.		G McGonigle 0-11, M Collins 1-2, J O’Dwyer 1-0, O Collins 0-2, D Doherty 0-1.	Referee: A Mac Suibhne (Dublin)

=== Knock-out stage ===
Quarter-finals

14 April 2002 Quarter-final	Clare	0-9 - 0-23	Limerick	Semple Stadium, Thurles
	J O’Connor 0-3, D Forde 0-2, S McMahon 0-2, J Reddan 0-1, T Carmody 0-1.		M Keane 0-11, O Moran 0-3, M Foley 0-2, B Foley 0-2, B Begley 0-2, C Fitzgerald 0-2, M O’Brien 0-1.	Referee: A Mac Suibhne (Dublin)

14 April 2002 Quarter-final	Tipperary	4-13 - 1-17	Galway	Semple Stadium, Thurles
	E Kelly 0-11, J O'Brien 2-1, L Corbett 1-1, B O’Meara 1-0.		E Cloonan 1-8, J Rabbitte 0-3, D Hayes 0-3, R Murray 0-2, R Gantley 0-1.	Referee: B Kelly (Westmeath)

Semi-finals

21 April 2002 Semi-final	Cork	0-21 - 1-10	Tipperary	Páirc Uí Chaoimh, Cork
	B O’Connor 0-6, J O’Connor 0-6, N McCarthy 0-3, K Murphy 0-2, S Gardiner 0-2, D O'Sullivan 0-1, P Ryan 0-1.		E Kelly 1-3, E O’Neill 0-2, L Corbett 0-2, L Cahill 0-1, J Carroll 0-1, T Dunne 0-1.	Referee: D Murphy (Wexford)

21 April 2002 Semi-final	Limerick	0-15 - 2-14	Kilkenny	Gaelic Grounds, Limerick
	M Keane 0-7, M Foley 0-2, D Ryan 0-2, B Begley 0-1, O Moran 0-1, M O’Brien 0-1, O O’Neill 0-1.		H Shefflin 1-7, M Comerford 1-4, JJ Delaney 0-1, D Lyng 0-1, S Grehan 0-1.	Referee: P Horan (Offaly)

Final

5 May 2002 Final	Kilkenny	2-15 - 2-14	Cork	Semple Stadium, Thurles
	M Comerford 1-3, J Hoyne 1-0, H Shefflin 0-3, A Comerford 0-2, P Dowling 0-2, E Brennan 0-2, D Lyng 0-1, R Mullaly 0-1, S Dowling 0-1.		E Collins 2-0, J O'Connor 0-4, A Browne 0-3, B O'Connor 0-2, D O'Sullivan 0-1, J Gardiner 0-1, N McCarthy 0-1, T McCarthy 0-1, K Murray 0-1.

=== Scoring statistics ===
Top scorers overall

Rank	Player	Team	Tally	Total	Matches	Average
1	Mark Keane	Limerick	4-44	56	7	8.00
2	Eoin Kelly	Tipperary	2-41	47	7	6.71
3	Nicky Horan	Meath	2-38	44	7	6.28
4	Henry Shefflin	Kilkenny	3-32	41	7	5.85
5	Eugene Cloonan	Galway	1-28	31	4	7.75
6	John O'Brien	Tipperary	6-09	27	6	4.50
6	Paul Flynn	Waterford	3-18	27	5	5.40
6	Ken McGrath	Waterford	1-24	27	5	5.20
6	Joe Dooley	Offaly	0-27	27	5	5.20
10	Barry Lambert	Wexford	1-23	26	4	6.50
10	Eddie Brennan	Kilkenny	3-17	26	7	3.71
10	Ollie Collins	Derry	1-23	26	7	3.71

Top scorers in a single game

Rank	Player	Team	Tally	Total	Opposition
1	Mark Keane	Limerick	2-08	14	Derry
2	Michael Collins	Derry	4-01	13	Dublin
2	Mark Keane	Limerick	2-07	13	Tipperary
4	Eugene Cloonan	Galway	1-08	11	Tipperary
4	Geoffrey McGonagle	Derry	0-11	11	Meath
4	Mark Keane	Limerick	0-11	11	Clare
4	Eoin Kelly	Tipperary	0-11	11	Galway
8	Éamonn Collins	Cork	3-01	10	Offaly
8	Eddie Brennan	Kilkenny	2-04	10	Meath
8	Mark O'Leary	Tipperary	2-04	10	Derry
8	John O'Brien	Tipperary	2-04	10	Derry
8	Barry Lambert	Wexford	1-07	10	Offaly
8	Henry Shefflin	Kilkenny	1-07	10	Limerick

== Division 2 ==
=== Division 2A ===
Pos	Team	Pld	W	D	L	F	A	Diff	Pts	Notes
1	Antrim	4	4	0	0	8-60	1-47	34	8	Division 2 runners-up
2	Down	4	3	0	1	10-50	5-42	23	6	
3	Kildare	4	1	1	2	1-52	6-48	-1	3	
4	Westmeath	4	1	1	2	3-42	7-53	-23	3	
5	Roscommon	4	0	0	4	5-38	5-62	-24	0	

=== Division 2B ===
Pos	Team	Pld	W	D	L	F	A	Diff	Pts	Notes
1	Laois	4	4	0	0	4-70	3-41	32	8	Division 2 champions
2	Kerry	4	2	0	2	7-49	3-41	20	4	
3	Carlow	4	2	0	2	9-45	10-48	-6	4	
4	Wicklow	4	2	0	2	10-53	7-46	-16	4	
5	London	4	0	0	4	5-29	12-70	-62	0	Relegated to Division 3

==== Results ====
===== Relegation play-offs =====
April 13 Semi-final	Westmeath	4-12 - 0-12	London	Lawless Memorial Park, Swords

April 13 Semi-final	Carlow	2-24 - 2-16	Roscommon

April 20 Final	London	1-14 - 1-17	Roscommon	Emerald GAA Grounds, Ruislip

===== Knock-out stage =====
April 21 Semi-final	Laois	2-12 - 2-9	Down	Drogheda Park, Drogheda

April 21 Semi-final	Antrim	4-14 - 3-8	Kerry	St. Conleth's Park, Newbridge

May 5 Final	Laois	1-20 - 2-14	Antrim	Semple Stadium, Thurles

=== Division Three ===
==== Results ====
===== Relegation play-off =====
April 20 Final	Sligo	4-12 - 0-5	Fermanagh	Fr. Tierney Park, Ballyshannon

===== Knock-out stage =====
April 21 Semi-final	Longford	3-13 - 2-5	Donegal	Brewster Park, Enniskillen

May 5 Final	Longford	1-12 - 0-12	Louth	Páirc Tailteann, Navan

=== Division Four ===
==== Results ====
===== Knock-out stage =====
April 20 Semi-final	Monaghan	4-10 - 0-10	Tyrone	Healy Park, Omagh

May 5 Final	Monaghan	1-14 - 4-5	Mayo	Cusack Park, Mullingar

May 11 Final replay	Mayo	1-15 - 1-5	Monaghan	Markievicz Park, Sligo
