= 2006 National Hurling League =

75th annual hurling competition for the GAA county teams

League details
- Dates: 19 February – 30 April 2006
- Teams: 32

League champions
- Winners: Kilkenny (13th win)
- Captain: Jackie Tyrell
- Manager: Brian Cody

League runners-up
- Runners-up: Limerick
- Captain: T. J. Ryan
- Manager: Joe McKenna

Other division winners
- Division 2: Dublin
- Division 3: Armagh
- Division 3 Shield: Tyrone

The 2006 National Hurling League, known for sponsorship reasons as the Allianz National Hurling League, was the 75th edition of the National Hurling League (NHL), an annual hurling competition for the GAA county teams. Kilkenny won the league, beating Limerick in the final.

== Structure ==
=== Division 1 ===
There are 12 teams in Division 1, divided into 1A and 1B. Each team plays all the others in its group once, earning 2 points for a win and 1 for a draw.

- The first-placed teams in 1A and 1B advance to the NHL semi-finals.
- The second- and third-placed teams in 1A and 1B advance to the NHL quarter-finals.
- The fifth- and sixth-placed teams in 1A and 1B go into the relegation semi-finals and final.

=== Division 2 ===
There are 11 teams in Division 2, divided into 2A and 2B.

- The first-placed teams in 2A and 2B advance to the Division 2 semi-finals.
- The second- and third-placed teams in 2A and 2B advance to the NHL quarter-finals.
- The Division 2 champions are promoted.
- The bottom two teams in 2A and 2B go into the relegation semi-finals and final.

=== Division 3 ===
There are 9 teams in Division 3, divided into 3A and 3B.

- The top two teams in 3A and 3B advance to the Division 3 semi-finals.
- The Division 3 champions are promoted.
- The other teams in 3A and 3B go into the Division 3 Shield.

== Overview ==
=== Division 1 ===
Brian Cody won his fourth league title with Kilkenny, and the second in succession, as 'the Cats' remained the only undefeated team throughout the entire league. Limerick, who were league runners-up, also enjoyed an unbeaten run in the group stage courtesy of three wins and two drawn games with Kilkenny and Tipperary, however, they fell to Kilkenny in the final.

Down at the other end of the table, the four bottom-placed teams and relegation candidates were Antrim, Down, Laois and Wexford. Laois, after losing all of their group stage games, eventually lost a play-off to Down and faced relegation for the following season.

=== Division 2 ===
Dublin won the Division 2 title after an unbeaten run throughout the group and knock-out stages, thus returning to the top flight having been relegated the previous year. Runners-up Kerry also remained undefeated until the last day of the league when they were defeated in the final by 'the Dubs'. Going down were Roscommon who recorded only one victory in the group stage before losing to London and Wicklow in the relegation play-offs.

=== Division 3 ===
Armagh and Longford qualified for the league final in this division with Armagh winning promotion.

== Division 1A ==
National Hurling League Division 1
- Season: 2006
- Champions: Kilkenny; 13th National League title Captain: Jackie Tyrrell; Manager: Brian Cody
- Relegated: Laois
- Matches: 38
- Top goalscorer: Mark Keane (4-50)
- Biggest home win: Clare 5-21 - 0-9 Down (19 February 2006)
- Biggest away win: Waterford 6-12 - 0-8 Down (6 March 2006)
- All statistics correct as of 26 April 2017.

Kilkenny came into the season as defending champions of the 2004 season. Offaly entered Division 1 as the promoted team.

On 30 April 2006, Kilkenny won the title following a 3-11 to 0-14 win over Limerick in the final. It was their second league title in succession and their 13th National League title overall.

Laois, who lost all of their group stage matches, were relegated from Division 1 after losing both their matches in the relegation play-offs. Dublin won Division 2 and secured promotion to the top tier.

Limerick's Mark Keane was the Division 1 top scorer with 4-50.

=== Division 1A table ===
Pos	Team	Pld	W	D	L	Diff	Pts	Notes
1	Clare	5	4	0	1	+33	8	
2	Offaly	5	3	1	1	+5	7	
3	Waterford	5	3	0	2	+16	6	
4	Cork	5	2	1	2	+31	5	
5	Wexford	5	2	0	3	-3	4	
6	Down	5	0	0	5	-82	0	

=== Group stage ===
19 February 2006 Round 1	Offaly	1-21 - 2-18	Cork	St. Brendan's Park, Birr
	B Carroll 0-13, J Bergin 1-1, D Hayden 0-2, M O’Hara 0-2, B Murphy 0-1, G Hanniffy 0-1, A Egan 0-1.		J Deane 1-7, D O’Sullivan 1-2, T McCarthy 0-3, M O’Connell 0-2, R Conway 0-2, K Murphy 0-1, J Gardiner 0-1.	Referee: M Haverty (Galway)

19 February 2006 Round 1	Clare	5-21 - 0-9	Down	Cusack Park, Ennis
	B Nugent 2-4, T Carmody 1-6, A Quinn 1-1, T Griffin 0-4, D McMahon 1-0, J McInerney 0-2, P Donnellan 0-1, C Plunkett 0-1, B O'Connell 0-1, F Lynch 0-1.		B McGourty 0-5, E McGuinness 0-2, D Flynn 0-1, A Savage 0-1.	Referee: B White (Tipperary)

19 February 2006 Round 1	Waterford	1-13 - 0-14	Wexford	Fraher Field, Dungarvan
	P Flynn 1-6, E Kelly 0-3, J Mullane 0-2, M Walsh 0-1, S Prendergast 0-1.		D Stamp 0-4, T Mahon 0-4, S Doyle 0-3, M Jacob 0-2, MJ Furlong 0-1.	Referee: J Sexton (Limerick)

26 February 2006 Round 2	Down	1-14 - 1-18	Offaly	McKenna Park, Ballycran
	P Braniff 1-3, M Coulter 0-5, S Wilson 0-3, B McGourty 0-2, G Johnson 0-1.		B Carroll 0-11, G Hanniffy 1-0, J Bergin 0-2, D Hayden 0-1, R Hanniffy 0-1, M O'Hare 0-1, A Egan 0-1, D Murray 0-1.	Referee: T McIntyre (Antrim)

26 February 2006 Round 2	Cork	2-15 - 0-25	Waterford	Páirc Uí Rinn, Cork
	J Deane 0-5, N Ronan 1-1, C Cusack 1-0, K Murphy 0-2 (E Own), R Conway 0-2, N McCarthy 0-1, M O'Connell 0-1, D O'Sullivan 0-1; T Kenny 0-1, J Gardiner 0-1.		E Kelly 0-7, P Flynn 0-6; D Shanahan 0-3, M Walsh 0-2; J Mullane 0-2, S Prenergast 0-1, C Carey 0-1, B Phelan 0-1, J Kennedy 0-1, S O'Sullivan 0-1.	Referee: S Roche (Tipperary)

26 February 2006 Round 2	Wexford	2-13 - 0-11	Clare	Wexford Park, Wexford
	R Jacob 1-8, MJ Furlong 1-0, E Quigley 0-2, M Jacob 0-1; D Mythen 0-1, PJ Nolan 0-1.		T Carmody (0-4, all frees), P Donnellan (0-2, one free), N Gilligan (0-2), B O'Connell (0-1), B Nugent (0-1), F Lynch (0-1).	Referee: J McDonnell (Tipperary)

11 March 2006 Round 3	Offaly	1-10 - 0-12	Wexford	St. Brendan's Park, Birr
	B Carroll 1-9, D Hayden 0-1.		R Jacob 0-4, PJ Nolan 0-2; D Lyng 0-2; T Mahon 0-1, E Quigley 0-1, D Mythen 0-1, D Stamp 0-1.	Referee: E Morris (Dublin)

12 March 2006 Round 3	Cork	3-25 - 0-9	Down	Páirc Uí Rinn, Cork
	J Deane 1-7, B Corcoran 1-3, C Cusack 1-1, K Murphy (Sars) 0-3, C McCann 0-3, K Murphy (E Own) 0-2; N Ronan 0-2, R Conway 0-1, P Kelly 0-1; J Gardiner 0-1, C O'Connor 0-1.		P Braniff 0-4, M Coulter 0-2, S Murray 0-1, A Savage 0-1, C Coulter 0-1.	Referee: D Connolly (Kilkenny)

12 March 2006 Round 3	Waterford	0-15 - 1-16	Clare	Walsh Park, Waterford
	P Flynn 0-6, D Shanahan 0-3, J Mullane 0-3; J Kennedy 0-2, M Walsh 0-1.		T Carmody 0-6, D Quinn 1-1, D McMahon 0-3, F Lynch 0-2, T Griffin 0-1, B Lynch 0-1, B O'Connell 0-1, B Nugent 0-1,	Referee: D Kirwan (Cork)

26 March 2006 Round 4	Clare	2-22 - 2-14	Offaly	Cusack Park, Ennis
	T Carmody 1-2, T Griffin 1-2, D Quinn 0-5, B Nugent 0-4, D McMahon 0-3, J Clancy 0-2; N Gilligan 0-2, D O'Rourke 0-2.		J Bergin 1-3, B Carroll 0-4, M Cordial 1-0, A Egan 0-3, B Murphy 0-2, D Hayden 0-1, D Murray 0-1.	Referee: S Roche (Tipperary)

26 March 2006 Round 4	Down	0-8 - 6-12	Waterford	St. Patrick's Park, Portaferry
	P Braniff 0-5, B McGourty 0-1, C Coulter 0-1, A Savage 0-1.		P Flynn 1-4, S Prendergast 2-0, J Kennedy 2-0, J Mullane 1-3, D Shanahan 0-4, S O'Sullivan 0-1.	Referee: F Smith (Meath)

2 April 2006 Round 4	Wexford	0-7 - 0-19	Cork	Wexford Park, Wexford
	D Ruth 0-2, D Stamp 0-1, D Lyng 0-1, E Quigley 0-1, R Jacob 0-1, D Mythen 0-1.		N Ronan 0-10, B Corcoran 0-4, N McCarthy 0-2, S Og hAilpin 0-1, R Curran 0-1, C Naughton 0-1.	Referee: A Mac Suibhne (Dublin)

9 April 2006 Round 5	Offaly	3-14 - 0-15	Waterford	St. Brendan's Park, Birr
	J Bergin 2-3, B Carroll 0-5, A Egan 1-0, G Hanniffy 0-2, D Hayden 0-2, M O'Hara 0-1, A Hanrahan 0-1.		P Flynn 0-7, E Kelly 0-5, K McGrath 0-2, G O'Connor 0-1.	Referee: P O'Connor (Limerick)

9 April 2006 Round 5	Down	1-11 - 0-18	Wexford	McKenna Park, Ballycran
	P Braniff 0-4, M Coulter 0-4, E Clarke 1-0, A Savage 0-2, B McGourty 0-1.		R Jacob 0-6, S Doyle 0-3, D Mythen 0-2, D Stamp 0-1, E Quigley 0-1, P Carley 0-1, B Lambert 0-1, K Kavanagh 0-1, D Ruth 0-1, M Jacob 0-1.	Referee: B Kelly (Westmeath)

9 April 2006 Round 5	Cork	0-16 - 0-18	Clare	Páirc Uí Rinn, Cork
	T Kenny 0-7, C Naughton 0-3, J Gardiner 0-2, C O'Connor 0-1, C McGann 0-1, J O'Connor 0-1, C Cusack 0-1.		N Gilligan 0-10, C Lynch 0-2, S McMahon 0-2, B Nugent 0-2, D McMahon 0-1, G Quinn 0-1.	Referee: M Haverty (Galway)

== Division 1B ==
=== Division 1B table ===
Pos	Team	Pld	W	D	L	Diff	Pts	Notes
1	Kilkenny	5	4	1	0	+33	9	Division 1 champions
2	Limerick	5	3	2	0	+24	8	Division 1 runners-up
3	Tipperary	5	2	1	2	+4	4	
4	Galway	5	2	0	3	+10	4	
5	Antrim	5	2	0	3	-16	4	
6	Laois	5	0	0	5	-55	0	Relegated to Division 2

=== Group stage ===
19 February 2006 Round 1	Antrim	1-14 - 0-16	Galway	Casement Park, Belfast
	J McIntosh 1-7, P Richmond 0-3, S Og McFadden 0-2, C Cunning 0-1, M Scullion 0-1.		G Farragher 0-10, E Cloonan 0-3, F Healy 0-1, K Broderick 0-1, N Healy 0-1.	Referee: E Morris (Dublin)

19 February 2006 Round 1	Kilkenny	1-26 - 1-13	Laois	Nowlan Park, Kilkenny
	R Power 0-13, E Brennan 1-1, J Fitzpatrick 0-4, M Rice 0-3, A Fogarty 0-2, A Murphy 0-1, M Kavanagh 0-1, P Cleere 0-1.		J Young 0-8, D Culleton 1-0, P Russell 0-2, C Healy 0-1, J Coogan 0-1, J Rowney 0-1.	Referee: B Gavin (Offaly)

19 February 2006 Round 1	Limerick	2-15 - 2-15	Tipperary	Gaelic Grounds, Limerick
	A O'Shaughnessy 1-2, M Keane 0-5, N Moran 1-0, O Moran 0-2, M O'Brien 0-2, N Collins 0-1, D Moloney 0-1; D O'Grady 0-1, B Begley 0-1.		S Butler 1-7, G O'Grady 1-1; C O'Mahoney 0-3, J O'Brien 0-2, B Dunne 0-2.	Referee: D Murphy (Wexford)

26 February 2006 Round 2	Laois	0-8 - 2-10	Antrim	O'Moore Park, Portlaoise
	J Young 0-7, E Meagher 0-1.		J McIntosh 1-4, P Richmond 1-1, B McFall 0-2, B Delargy 0-1, S McFadden 0-1, B Quinn 0-1.	Referee: F Smith (Meath)

26 February 2006 Round 2	Tipperary	0-10 - 0-19	Kilkenny	Semple Stadium, Thurles
	S Butler 0-6, C O'Mahony 0-2, B Dunne 0-1, S McGrath 0-1.		R Power 0-7, J Fitzpatrick 0-5, A Fogarty 0-2, D Lyng 0-1, E Larkin 0-1; R Mullally 0-1, M Rice 0-1; J Dalton 0-1.	Referee: M Wadding (Waterford)

26 February 2006 Round 2	Galway	0-13 - 0-14	Limerick	Pearse Stadium, Galway
	G Farragher 0-7 (6f, 1 65), N Healy 0-2, K Broderick, R Murray, E Cloonan all 0-1 each.		M Keane 0-9 (7f), B Begley 0-2, P O'Grady, M O'Brien, O Moran (f) all 0-1 each.	Referee: A Mac Suibhne (Dublin)

11 March 2006 Round 3	Galway	3-12 - 0-5	Laois	Pearse Stadium, Galway
	G Farragher 1-6, R Murray 2-1, D Tierney 0-3, N Healy 0-1; C Dervan 0-1.		J Young 0-4; E Meagher 0-1.	Referee: B Kelly (Westmeath)

12 March 2006 Round 3	Limerick	1-11 - 0-14	Kilkenny	Gaelic Grounds, Limerick
	M Keane 1-5, C Fitzgerald 0-3; B Begley 0-1, P O'Grady 0-1, D O'Grady 0-1.		E Larkin 0-5, A Fogarty 0-2, M Rice 0-2; W O'Dwyer 0-2, R Power 0-2, D Lyng 0-1.	Referee: B Gavin (Offaly)

12 March 2006 Round 3	Antrim	1-7 - 1-11	Tipperary	Páirc Mhuire, Cushendall
	J McIntosh 0-5, P Richmond 1-0, K McKeegan 0-1, M Herron 0-1.		D Egan 0-9, D Fanning 1-0, C O'Mahony 0-1, E Brislane 0-1.	Referee: J McGrath (Westmeath)

26 March 2006 Round 4	Kilkenny	0-12 - 1-7	Antrim	Nowlan Park, Kilkenny
	E Larkin 0-4; E Reid 0-2, M Comerford 0-1, B Barry 0-1, M Fennelly 0-1; M Rice 0-1, W O'Dwyer 0-1, E Brennan 0-1.		J Scullion 1-1, K McKeegan 0-2, J McIntosh 0-2, M Herron 0-1, J Campbell 0-1.	Referee: A Mac Suibhne (Dublin)

26 March 2006 Round 4	Tipperary	0-12 - 3-11	Galway	Semple Stadium, Thurles
	E Kelly 0-3, D Egan 0-3, C O'Mahony 0-2, P Kelly 0-1, J Devane 0-1, J O'Brien 0-1, D Fanning 0-1.		R Murray 1-2; G Farragher 1-2, D Tierney 1-2, N Healy 0-2, F Healy 0-1, D Forde 0-1, E Cloonan 0-1.	Referee: D Kirwan (Cork)

26 March 2006 Round 4	Laois	0-13 - 1-14	Limerick	O'Moore Park, Portlaoise
	P Russell 0-6; J Hooban, M Rooney 0-2 each; Paul Cuddy, S Dwyer, J Phelan 0-1 each.		C Fitzgerald 0-4; D Ryan 1-1; M Keane 0-3; A O'Shaughnessy, S Lucey 0-2 each; B Geary, B Begley 0-1 each.	Referee: D Murphy (Wexford)

2 April 2006 Round 5	Galway	0-10 - 1-16	Kilkenny	Pearse Stadium, Galway
	G Farragher 0-6, N Healy 0-3, R Murray 0-1.		W O'Dwyer 1-1, R Power 0-4, E Larkin 0-3; M Comerford 0-2, A Fogarty 0-2, D Cody 0-1; M Rice 0-1; J Fitzpatrick 0-1, J Ryall 0-1.	Referee: B Kelly (Westmeath)

2 April 2006 Round 5	Laois	0-12 - 4-17	Tipperary	O'Moore Park, Portlaoise
	P Russell 0-4; J Hyland 0-3, E Meagher 0-2, D Rooney 0-1; P Cuddy 0-1, D Carter 0-1.		M Webster 2-4, K Dunne 1-4, J Carroll 1-1; D Egan 0-2, E Brislane 0-2, C O'Mahony 0-2, S McGrath 0-1, J Woodlock 0-1.	Referee: M Wadding (Waterford)

2 April 2006 Round 5	Antrim	2-11 - 4-24	Limerick	Casement Park, Belfast
	B Quinn 1-1, C Cunning 1-0; J McIntosh 0-3, B McFall 0-2, K McKeegan 0-2, G Bell 0-1, P Richmond 0-1, J Scullion 0-1.		M Keane 1-9, A O'Shaughnessy 3-2, O Moran 0-3, C Fitzgerald 0-3; N Collins 0-2, B Geary 0-1, P O'Grady 0-1, D Ryan 0-1; S Lucey 0-1, N Moran 0-1.	Referee: E Morris (Dublin)

=== Relegation play-offs ===
Semi-finals

16 April 2006 Semi-final	Antrim	1-17 - 0-15	Down	Casement Park, Belfast
	J McIntosh 1-11, P Richmond 0-2, C Cunning 0-1; M Herron 0-1, C Herron 0-1, B Quinn 0-1.		P Braniff 0-7, E Clarke 0-2, A Savage 0-2, C Coulter 0-1; B McGourty 0-1, G Adair 0-1, R McGrattan 0-1.	Referee: G Devlin (Armagh)

16 April 2006 Semi-final	Wexford	2-31 - 3-14 (aet)	Laois	Nowlan Park, Kilkenny
	R Jacob (0-9), D Mythen (1-4); S Doyle (1-1), M Jacob (0-4), E Quigley (0-4), P Carley (0-3), D Ruth (0-2), D Lyng (0-2); B Lambert (0-2).		P Russell (1-4), J Young (0-6), J Hooban (1-1), S Dwyer (1-0); J Fitzpatrick (0-2), D Cuddy (0-1).	Referee: J McDonnell (Tipperary)

Final

30 April 2006 Final	Down	2-16 - 0-19	Laois	Páirc Tailteann, Navan
	M Coulter 1-7, P Braniff 1-4, R McGrattan 0-1, A Savage 0-1, G Adair 0-1, B McGourty 0-1, J McGrattan 0-1.		J Young 0-9, S Dwyer 0-3, D Rooney 0-3, D Cuddy 0-2, J Hooban 0-1, C Healy 0-1.	Referee: J Ryan (Tipperary)

== Division 1 Knockout ==
Quarter-finals

16 April 2006 Quarter-final	Limerick	0-21 - 0-14	Waterford	Semple Stadium, Thurles
	M Keane (0-9), D Ryan (0-5), D Grady (0-2), C Fitzgerald (0-2), M Foley (0-1), A O'Shaughnessy (0-1), S Lucey (0-1).		J Mullane (0-4), P Flynn (0-3), D Bennett (0-3), D Shanahan (0-3), J Kennedy (0-1).	Referee: D Kirwan (Cork)

16 April 2006 Quarter-final	Tipperary	2-21 - 3-14	Offaly	Semple Stadium, Thurles
	E Kelly (1-3), M Webster (1-2), K Dunne (0-5), P Kelly (0-4), S McGrath (0-3), C Morrissey (0-2), H Moloney (0-1), J O'Brien (0-1).		B Carroll (2-5), A Egan (1-1), M Cordial (0-2), B Murphy (0-2), J Bergin (0-2), R Hanniffy (0-1), D Hayden (0-1).	Referee: M Haverty (Galway)

Semi-finals

23 April 2006 Semi-final	Tipperary	2-11 - 3-20	Kilkenny	Semple Stadium, Thurles
	E Kelly (2-6), P Kelly (0-2), K Dunne (0-1), D Egan (0-1), J O' Brien (0-1).		M Comerford (1-5), H Shefflin (1-3), J Fitzpatrick (1-2), A Fogarty (0-4), W O'Dwyer (0-2), E Larkin (0-2), D Lyng (0-1), E Reid (0-1).	Referee: B Kelly (Westmeath)

23 April 2006 Semi-final	Limerick	3-23 - 2-22 (aet)	Clare	Semple Stadium, Thurles
	M Keane (2-10), B Begley (1-0), A O'Shaughnessy (0-3), D Moloney (0-2), C Fitzgerald (0-2), D Ryan (0-1), M O'Brien (0-1), S Lucey (0-1), B Foley (0-1), N Moran (0-1), P Kirby (0-1).		N Gilligan (1-4), D McMahon (1-3), D Quinn (0-4), F Lynch (0-3), B Nugent (0-3), T Griffin (0-2), S McMahon (0-2), J Clancy (0-1), D O'Rourke (0-1).	Referee: B Gavin (Offaly)

Final

30 April 2006 Final	Kilkenny	3-11 - 0-14	Limerick	Semple Stadium, Thurles
	H Shefflin (2-6), E Larkin (1-0), J Fitzpatrick (0-2), A Fogarty (0-1), W O'Dwyer (0-1), M Fennelly (0-1).		B Foley (0-6), C Fitzgerald (0-4), S Lucey (0-2), B Begley (0-1), N Moran (0-1).	Attendance: 16,804; Referee: D Kirwan (Cork)

=== Scoring statistics ===
Top scorers overall

Rank	Player	Team	Tally	Total	Matches	Average
1	Mark Keane	Limerick	4-50	62	7	8.85
2	Brian Carroll	Offaly	3-47	56	6	9.33
3	Johnny McIntosh	Antrim	3-32	41	6	6.83
4	Paul Flynn	Waterford	2-32	38	6	6.33
5	Ger Farragher	Galway	2-31	37	5	5.40
6	James Young	Laois	0-34	34	5	6.80
7	Paul Braniff	Down	2-27	33	6	5.50
8	Rory Jacob	Wexford	1-28	31	6	5.16
9	Richie Power	Kilkenny	0-26	26		
10	Joe Deane	Cork	2-19	25	3	8.33

Top scorers in a single game

Rank	Player	Team	Tally	Total	Opposition
1	Mark Keane	Limerick	2-10	16	Clare
2	Johnny McIntosh	Antrim	1-11	14	Down
3	Brian Carroll	Offaly	0-13	13	Cork
3	Richie Power	Kilkenny	0-13	13	Laois
4	Eoin Kelly	Tipperary	2-06	12	Kilkenny
4	Henry Shefflin	Kilkenny	2-06	12	Limerick
4	Brian Carroll	Offaly	1-09	12	Wexford
4	Mark Keane	Limerick	1-09	12	Antrim
5	Brian Carroll	Offaly	2-05	11	Tipperary
5	Rory Jacob	Wexford	1-08	11	Clare
5	Brian Carroll	Offaly	0-11	11	Down

== Division 2 ==
National Hurling League Division 2
- Season: 2006
- Champions: Dublin; Captain: Philip Brennan; Manager: Tommy Naughton
- Relegated: Roscommon
- Matches: 34
- All statistics correct as of 2 March 2018.

On 30 April 2006, Dublin won the title following a 0-17 to 1-6 win over Kerry in the final. It was their first Division 2 title since 1997.

Roscommon, who lost all but one of their group stage matches, were relegated from Division 2 after losing both their matches in the relegation play-offs.

=== Division 2A table ===
Pos	Team	Pld	W	D	L	Diff	Pts	Notes
1	Dublin	5	5	0	0	+61	10	Division 2 champions
2	Meath	5	4	0	1	+18	8	
3	Derry	5	2	0	3	+12	4	
4	Carlow	5	2	0	3	+2	4	
5	Roscommon	5	1	0	4	-42	2	
6	Wicklow	5	1	0	4	-51	2	

=== Group stage ===
19 February 2006 Round 1	Derry	0-13 - 1-15	Dublin	Lavey
	G Biggs (0-8, 8 frees), R Convery (0-2), P Hearty (0-2), C Quinn (0-1).		D Curtin (0-8, 8 frees), P Carton (1-0), K Flynn (0-2), D Sweeney (0-1), S McDonnell (0-1), D Russell (0-1), G Bennett (0-1), A McCrabbe (0-1).	Referee: J McCarthy (Westmeath)

19 February 2006 Round 1	Carlow	1-14 - 1-09	Roscommon	Dr. Cullen Park, Carlow
	P Coady 0-8 (seven frees, one 65), M Brennan 1-2, D Roberts 0-2, A Brennan 0-1, R Dunbar 0-1.		R Mulry 0-7, (five frees), B Kelly 1-0, M Connaughton 0-1, free, M Kelly 0-1.

19 February 2006 Round 1	Wicklow	2-12 - 2-15	Meath	Pearse Park, Arklow
	A O'Brien 1-1, E Glynn 1-0, J O'Neill 0-6, E Furlong 0-1, W O'Gorman 0-1, J Keogh 0-1, C Kavanagh 0-1, T McGrath 0-1.		N Horan 1-5, T Reilly 1-1, D Kirby 0-3, J Watters 0-2, S Clynch 0-2, J Kenna 0-1, D Donnelly 0-1.

26 February 2006 Round 2	Dublin	5-23 - 1-07	Wicklow	Parnell Park, Dublin
	K Flynn 3-0, D Curtin 0-11, A McCrabbe 1-3, S Mullen 1-2, S McDonnell 0-3, D Sweeney 0-1; R Fallon 0-1, P Carton 0-1, D Russell 0-1.		A O'Brien 1-1, J O'Neill 0-4, J Bermingham 0-1, C Kavanagh 0-1.

26 February 2006 Round 2	Meath	0-13 - 0-08	Carlow	Páirc Tailteann, Navan
	N Horan 0-8, T Reilly 0-2, G O’Neill 0-1, S Clynch 0-1, D Kirby 0-1.		P Coady 0-4, D Roberts 0-2, P Kehoe 0-1, S Kavanagh 0-1.	Referee: J Owens (Wexford)

26 February 2006 Round 2	Roscommon	1-12 - 3-13	Derry	Knockcroghery
	R Mulroy 0-4, T Galvin 1-0, M Connaughton 0-3, M Kelly 0-2, G Fallon 0-2, S Sweeney 0-1.		Gregory Biggs 1-9 (5 frees and two ‘65s’), K Hinphey 1-2, S McBride 1-0, C Quinn 0-2.	Referee: A Heagney (Clare)

11 March 2006 Round 3	Derry	0-12 - 1-12	Meath	Fr. McNally Park, Feeny
				Referee: T McIntyre (Antrim)

11 March 2006 Round 3	Wicklow	1-11 - 0-12	Carlow	Pearse Park, Arklow
	É Furlong (1-2), J Keogh (0-5), G Bermingham (0-1), MA O'Neill (0-1).		P Coady (0-8 frees), P Kehoe (0-3), D Roberts (0-1).	Referee: J Kelly (Wexford)

12 March 2006 Round 3	Dublin	4-19 - 1-05	Roscommon	Parnell Park, Dublin
	K Flynn 2-3, D Curtin 0-6; A McCrabbe 1-1, T McGrane 1-0, S Mullen 0-3; S McDonnell 0-2, L Ryan 0-2, D Sweeney 0-1, M Carton 0-1.		T Reddington 1-0, S Sweeney 0-2, T Lennon 0-1, D Waldron 0-1, G Fallon 0-1.	Referee: J Guinan (Kilkenny)

26 March 2006 Round 4	Carlow	0-14 - 1-05	Derry	Dr. Cullen Park, Carlow
	R Dunbar 0-7, P Keogh 0-2, D Roberts 0-2, S Kavanagh 0-1, A Brennan 0-1, M Ralph 0-1.		R Conway 1-1, G Biggs 0-3, S McBridge 0-1.	Referee: N Cosgrove (Tipperary)

26 March 2006 Round 4	Meath	0-09 - 1-10	Dublin	Páirc Tailteann, Navan
	N Horan 0-6, P Coone 0-1; J Keena 0-1, C Sheridan 0-1.		S Mullen 0-4; K Flynn 1-0, T McGrane 0-2, R Fallon 0-1, E Moran 0-1, K Dunne 0-1, A McCrabbe 0-1.	Referee: J Guinan (Kilkenny)

26 March 2006 Round 4	Roscommon	1-09 - 0-07	Wicklow	Athleague
	R Mulry 0-5; B Kelly 0-3; T Reddington 1-0; G Fallon 0-1.		J Keogh 0-5; G Birmingham, D Moran 0-1.

2 April 2006 Round 5	Roscommon	0-11 - 2-17	Meath	Athleague
	R Mulry 0-4, M Connaughton 0-2; L Murray 0-1; A Cunniffe 0-1, C Kelly 0-1, B Kelly 0-1, S Sweeney 0-1.		N Horan 0-7; T Reilly 0-6, P Coone 1-1, D Kirby 1-1, N Hackett 0-1, S Heavey 0-1.	Referee: P Devlin (Armagh)

2 April 2006 Round 5	Derry	4-16 - 1-07	Wicklow	Fr. McNally Park, Feeny
	P Hearty 2-3, C Quinn 1-2, G Biggs 0-5, S McBride 1-1, R Convery 0-3; R Kennedy 0-2.		D Moran 1-1, J Murphy 0-2, G Bermingham 0-2; T Doyle 0-1, M O'Neill 0-1.	Referee: T McIntyre (Antrim)

2 April 2006 Round 5	Dublin	3-14 - 2-16	Carlow	Broomfield Park, Malahide
	T McGrane 0-5, K Flynn 1-1, A McCrabbe 1-0, L Ryan 1-0, K Dunne 0-3; E Moran 0-2, M Carton 0-1, J McCaffrey 0-1; D Curtin 0-1.		B Lawler 1-2, R Dunbar 0-5; R Foley 1-1, A Brennan 0-3, S Kavanagh 0-3, D Murphy 0-1, J Waters 0-1.	Referee: J Sexton (Limerick)

=== Division 2B table ===
Pos	Team	Pld	W	D	L	Diff	Pts	Notes
1	Kerry	4	3	1	0	+13	7	Division 2 runners-up
2	Westmeath	4	3	1	0	+12	7	
3	Mayo	4	1	0	3	0	2	
4	Kildare	4	1	0	3	-10	2	
5	London	4	1	0	3	-15	2	

=== Group stage ===
19 February 2006 Round 1	London	1-11 - 1-14	Kerry	Emerald GAA Grounds, Ruislip
	S Kelly 0-8, K McMullan 1-0, J Ryan 0-1, S Quinn 0-1, E Carey 0-1.		S Brick 0-9, M Conway 1-1, J Griffin 0-2, K Hanafin 0-1, C Harris 0-1.	Referee: A Stapleton (Laois)

19 February 2006 Round 1	Mayo	2-14 - 1-08	Kildare	MacHale Park, Castlebar
	S Broderick 0-5, frees, S Morley 0-1, K Higgins 0-7, five frees, P Broderick 1-1, Stephen Hunt 1-0.		B White 0-1, free, E Hannon 0-1, P Reidy 1-3, 0-2 frees, M Dowd 0-1, A McAndrew 0-1, O Lynch 0-1.

26 February 2006 Round 2	Kerry	0-15 - 2-05	Mayo	Austin Stack Park, Tralee
	S Brick 0-5, M Conway 0-3, D Dineen 0-2, A Keane 0-1, K Hanafin 0-1, JM Dooley 0-1, E Fitzgerald 0-1, D Young 0-1.		K Higgins 0-4, P Broderick 1-0, S Hunt 1-0, S Broderick 0-1.	Referee: G Hoey (Clare)

26 February 2006 Round 2	Westmeath	1-14 - 1-10	Kildare	Radley Park, Leixlip
	B Kennedy 1-1, A Mitchell 0-4, J Shaw 0-4, B Lahart 0-2, D Devine 0-2, D Carthy 0-1.		B White 0-4, A McAndrew 1-0, M Dowd 0-3, D Horan 0-1, P Reidy 0-1, O Lynch 0-1.

11 March 2006 Round 3	London	3-07 - 1-09	Mayo	Emerald GAA Grounds, Ruislip

11 March 2006 Round 3	Westmeath	2-09 - 2-09	Kerry	Cusack Park, Mullingar
				Referee: J McDonnell

26 March 2006 Round 4	Mayo	0-11 - 1-09	Westmeath	MacHale Park, Castlebar
	K Higgins 0-5, P Broderick 0-2, S Broderick 0-1, P Higgins 0-1; D McDonnell 0-1, S Hunt 0-1.		A Mitchell 0-6, J Shaw 1-1, E Loughlin 0-1, B Murtagh 0-1.	Referee: J Healy (Clare)

26 March 2006 Round 4	Kildare	2-13 - 1-07	London	Celbridge
	A McAndrew 1-4, O Lynch 1-2, M Dowd 0-4, C Divilly 0-2, B White 0-1.		J Ryan 1-2, M O'Meara 0-2, M Gordon 0-1; D Smith 0-1, C Dolan 0-1.	Referee: T Ryan (Tipperary)

2 April 2006 Round 5	Westmeath	4-11 - 2-10	London	Cusack Park, Mullingar
	A Mitchell 2-5, J Shaw 1-0, D Carty 1-0, J Clarke 0-3, D McCormack 0-2, D Devine 0-1.		E Carey 0-5; J Ryan 1-1, S Quinn 1-0, B Foley 0-2, M O'Meara 0-1, K McMullen 0-1.	Referee: J O'Mahony (Limerick)

2 April 2006 Round 5	Kerry	1-12 - 0-09	Kildare	Austin Stack Park, Tralee
	S Brick 0-9, A Cronin 1-0, J Egan 0-1, M Slattery 0-1, P McCarthy 0-1.		B White 0-4, D Harney 0-1, C Buggy 0-1, P Reidy 0-1, A McAndrew 0-1, M Dowd 0-1.	Referee: A Heagney (Clare)

=== Relegation play-offs ===
Semi-finals

16 April 2006 Semi-final	Kildare	2-20 - 3-06	Wicklow	Dr. Cullen Park, Carlow
	M Dowd 2-3, D Harney 0-6, B White 0-4, C Buggy 0-4, O Lynch 0-2, A McAndrew 0-1,		A O'Brien 2-1, D Moran 1-1, J Keogh 0-2, E Glynn 0-1, J Murphy 0-1.	Referee: J McGrath (Westmeath)

23 April 2006 Semi-final	London	0-07 - 1-07	Roscommon	Lawless Memorial Park, Swords
	J Ryan 1-2, S Kelly 0-3, B Foley 0-2.		R Mulry 0-6, M Connaughton 0-1.

Final

30 April 2006 Final	Wicklow	7-15 - 3-06	Roscommon	Cusack Park, Mullingar
	W O'Gorman 4-2, A O'Brien 2-2, J Keogh 0-4, D Moran 1-0, J Murphy 0-2, G Doran 0-2, T Doyle 0-2, A Driver 0-1.		R Mulry 2-4, A Cunniffe 1-0, M Connaughton 0-1, D Waldron 0-1.	Referee: T Ryan (Tipperary)

=== Knock-out stage ===
Quarter-finals

9 April 2006 Quarter-final	Mayo	2-19 - 5-10 (aet)	Meath	Páirc Seán Mac Diarmada, Carrick

9 April 2006 Quarter-final	Westmeath	2-17 - 2-10	Derry	Páirc Mhuire, Scotstown
	A Mitchell 1-10, B Kennedy 1-1, E Laughlin 0-2, D McNicholas 0-1, G Gavin 0-1; B Connaughton 0-1; J Clarke 0-1.		Gregory Biggs 0-7, R Convery 1-0, C Quinn 1-0, P Hearty 0-2, N Bradley 0-1.	Referee: J O'Mahony (Limerick)

15 April 2006 Quarter-final replay	Mayo	1-14 - 2-06	Meath	Dr. Hyde Park, Roscommon
	S Broderick 0-7 (5 frees, 2 65s), P Broderick 1-4, K Higgins 0-2, S Hunt 0-1.		N Horan 2-1 (1 penalty and 1 free), J Keena 0-2 (1 free), G O'Neill, K Dowd, S Heavey 0-1 each.

Semi-finals

16 April 2006 Semi-final	Dublin	1-15 - 0-11	Westmeath	Páirc Tailteann, Navan
	D Curtin 0-6, K Flynn 1-2, K Dunne 0-2, J McCaffrey 0-2, E Moran 0-2, S McDonnell 0-1.		A Mitchell 0-7, B Murtagh 0-1, E Loughlin 0-1, G Gavin 0-1, B Kennedy 0-1.	Referee: D Connolly (Kilkenny)

23 April 2006 Semi-final	Kerry	1-17 - 1-16	Mayo	Cusack Park, Ennis
	S Brick 0-8, J Egan 1-1, M Slattery 0-4, JM Dooley 0-2, A Cronin 0-1, J Griffin 0-1.		S Broderick 1-5, P Higgins 0-3; S Hunt 0-2, S Coyne 0-2, P Broderick 0-2, K Healy 0-1, P McConn 0-1.	Referee: A Heagney (Clare)

Final

30 April 2006 Final	Dublin	0-17 - 1-06	Kerry	Semple Stadium, Thurles
	K Flynn 0-5, D Curtin 0-4, L Ryan 0-3, J McCaffrey 0-2, E Moran 0-1, S McDonnell 0-1, K Dunne 0-1.		J Egan 1-0, S Brick 0-3, A Boyle 0-1, I McCarthy 0-1, A Cronan 0-1.	Referee: B White (Tipperary)

== Division 3 ==
National Hurling League Division 3
- Season: 2006
- Champions: Armagh; Captain: Eddie Fearon; Manager: Mattie Lennon
- Matches: 25
- All statistics correct as of 2 March 2018.

On 30 April 2006, Armagh won the title following a 3-10 to 1-11 win over Longford in the final. It was their first Division 3 title since 1999.

=== Division 3A table ===
Pos	Team	Pld	W	D	L	Diff	Pts	Notes
1	Donegal	4	3	0	1	+19	6	
2	Louth	4	2	1	1	+13	5	
3	Monaghan	4	2	0	2	-6	4	
4	Sligo	4	2	0	2	-10	4	
5	Leitrim	4	0	1	3	-16	1	

=== Division 3B table ===
Pos	Team	Pld	W	D	L	Diff	Pts	Notes
1	Armagh	4	4	0	0	+50	8	Division 3 champions
2	Longford	4	3	0	1	+22	6	Division 3 runners-up
3	Fermanagh	4	2	0	2	-10	4	
4	Tyrone	4	1	0	3	+3	2	
5	Cavan	4	0	0	4	-65	0	

=== Knock-out stage ===
Quarter-finals

9 April 2006 Quarter-final	Louth	2-18 - 1-07	Fermanagh	Clontibret

9 April 2006 Quarter-final	Monaghan	1-03 - 5-19	Longford	Ballyconnell

Semi-finals

16 April 2006 Semi-final	Longford	0-13 - 1-09	Donegal	Kingspan Breffni Park, Cavan

16 April 2006 Semi-final	Armagh	3-13 - 1-08	Louth	St. Mary's Park, Castleblayney

Final

30 April 2006 Final	Armagh	3-10 – 1-11	Longford	Kingspan Breffni Park, Cavan

=== Shield ===
On 30 April 2006, Tyrone won the title following a 3-09 to 0-10 win over Sligo in the final.

Semi-finals

16 April 2006 Semi-final	Sligo	2-22 - 4-07	Cavan	Páirc Seán Mac Diarmada, Carrick

16 April 2006 Semi-final	Tyrone	0-17 - 1-13	Leitrim	Brewster Park, Enniskillen

Final

30 April 2006 Final	Tyrone	3-09 - 0-10	Sligo	Kingspan Breffni Park, Cavan
