= 2001 National Hurling League =

70th season of the National Hurling League

League details
- Dates: 4 February – 5 August 2001
- Teams: 33

League champions
- Winners: Tipperary (18th win)
- Captain: Tommy Dunne
- Manager: Nicky English

League runners-up
- Runners-up: Clare
- Captain: Brian Lohan
- Manager: Cyril Lyons

Other division winners
- Division 2: Kerry
- Division 3: Donegal

The 2001 National Hurling League, known for sponsorship reasons as the Allianz National Hurling League, was the 70th edition of the National Hurling League (NHL), an annual hurling competition for the GAA county teams. Tipperary won the league, beating Clare in the final.

== Structure ==
There are 14 teams in Division 1, divided into 1A and 1B. Each team plays all the others once, either home or away. Teams earn one point for a draw and two for a win. The top two teams in 1A and 1B play each other in the NHL semi-finals and final. The bottom teams in each group play each other in a relegation playoff.

There are 10 teams in Division 2. The top two play each other in the final, with the winner promoted. The bottom team is relegated.

There are 9 teams in Division 3. The top two play each other in the final, with the winner promoted.

== Division 1 ==
=== Division 1A ===
	Team	Pld	W	D	L	SF	SA	SD	Pts
1	Clare	6	5	0	1	12-104	7-73	46	10
2	Galway	6	5	0	1	10-81	7-54	36	10
3	Limerick	6	4	0	2	11-100	10-97	6	8
4	Offaly	6	3	0	3	9-95	8-80	18	6
5	Meath	6	2	0	4	4-60	8-68	-8	4
6	Dublin	6	1	0	5	9-61	12-107	-55	2
7	Antrim	4	1	0	3	8-40	10-59	-17	2

4 February 2001	Clare	4-15 - 0-14	Meath	Cusack Park, Ennis
	A Markham 1-5 (0-3f), S Ryan 2-0, D Forde 0-4, C Clancy 1-0, S McMahon 0-2 (1f), G Malone, C Harrison, C Lynch, G Considine 0-1 each.	Report	F McMahon 0-6, N Horan 0-6 (3f), D Dorran and D Reilly 0-1 each.	Referee: P O'Connor (Limerick)

4 February 2001	Offaly	2-23 - 3-11	Galway	St. Brendan's Park, Birr
	D Murray (0-14, 12 frees), J Pilkington (1-1), J Errity (0-4, all frees), C Gath (1-0), M O'Hara (0-1), B Whelahan (0-1), G Oakley (0-1), P Molloy (0-1).	Report	R Gantley (0-7, all frees), F Healy (1-1), D Tierney (1-1), M Kerins (1-1), O Canning (0-1).	Referee: S Roche (Wexford)

4 February 2001	Limerick	4-18 - 1-4	Antrim	Gaelic Grounds, Limerick
	M Keane 1-9, O Moran, 2-2, J Butler 1-1, P O'Grady 0-2, M Foley, M O'Brien, B Foley, S O'Connor 0-1 each.	Report	J Connolly 1-0, P Graham 0-2, M Kettle, J McIntosh 0-1 each.	Referee: B Kelly (Westmeath)

11 February 2001	Galway	0-12 - 0-9	Clare	Dunlo GAA Grounds, Ballinasloe
	D Tierney 0-3, O Fahy and A Kerins 0-2 each, R Gantley and C Moore 0-2 (frees) each, D O'Shaughnessy 0-1.	Report	A Markham 0-3f, PJ O'Connell and D Forde 0-2 each, S McMahon 0-2 (1f).	Referee: M Wadding (Waterford)

11 February 2001	Meath	1-12 - 0-11	Dublin	Páirc Tailteann, Navan
	F McMahon 0-9 (7f), N Horan 0-3 (2f), J Canty 1-0.	Report	T McGrane 0-7 (7)f, E Carroll 0-2, L Ryan, D Donnelly 0-1 each.	Referee: S McMahon (Clare)

11 February 2001	Antrim	2-13 - 2-9	Offaly	Casement Park, Belfast
	J McIntosh 2-1, J Connolly 0-5, C McCambridge 0-5, A Watt, P Graham 0-1 each.	Report	D Murray 0-5, B Murphy 1-0, M Duignan 1-0, J Troy 0-2, C Farrell, C Cassidy 0-1 each.	Referee: A Mac Suibhne (Dublin)

18 February 2001	Offaly	1-11 - 2-15	Limerick	St. Brendan's Park, Birr
	D Murray 0-5 (fs), M Hand 1-0, G Cassidy 0-3 (2fs, 1 x '65'), C Gath 0-2, W Comerford 0-1.	Report	B Foley 2-2 (1-1 pens), M Keane 0-4 (3fs), J Butler, B Begley 0-2, M O'Brien, O Moran 0-2 (1f), M Foley 0-1.	Referee: G Harrington (Cork)

18 February 2001	Clare	1-18 - 3-8	Antrim	Cusack Park, Ennis
	A Markham 1-3; S Ryan and S McMahon (frees) 0-3 each; C Lynch, B Murphy and O Baker 0-2 each; K Ralph, T Griffin and PJ O'Connell 0-1 each.	Report	D McKillop 1-1; J McIntosh and R McNaughton 1-0 each; B McFall (2f) and Conor McCambridge (frees) 0-3 each; J Connolly 0-1.	Referee: É Morris (Dublin)

18 February 2001	Dublin	2-4 - 2-14	Galway	Parnell Park, Dublin
	D Russell 1-0, G Ennis 1-0, E Carroll 0-3 (1f), L Ryan 0-1.	Report	A Kerins 1-2, D Tierney 1-0, D Shaughnessy 0-3 (3f), K Broderick 0-2, G Glynn 0-2, C Moore 0-2 (2 '65'), M Kerins, N Shaughnessy, J Culkin 0-1.	Referee: T McIntyre (Antrim)

1 April 2001	Meath	1-12 - 1-17	Offaly	Páirc Tailteann, Navan
	F McMahon 0-7,(6f), N Horan 0-5 (3f, 2 '65'), K Dowd 1-0.	Report	J Dooley 0-9 (6f, 2 65s), J Pilkington 1-1, G Hanniffy 0-3, G Oakley 0-2, R Hanniffy, B Murphy 0-1 each.	Referee: JA Gribben (Down)

1 April 2001	Galway	2-19 - 2-12	Limerick	Dunlo GAA Grounds, Ballinasloe
	L Burke 0-7 (06f), O Fahy 1-4, A Kerins 0-4, D Tierney 1-0, F Healy, P Walsh, N Linnane, D Shaughnessy 0-1.	Report	B Foley 1-5 (0-2f), J Butler 1-1, O Moran 0-2, J Moran, J Foley, M Keane (f) J Meskill (f) 0-1.	Referee: M Wadding (Waterford)

1 April 2001	Dublin	2-13 - 4-20	Clare	Parnell Park, Dublin
	D Sweeney 1-2, 1-1f, 0-1 65, T McGrane 0-5, 4f, D Donnelly 1-0, S McDonald 0-2, E Carroll 0-2, L Ryan, K Flynn 0-1.	Report	B Murphy 2-2, J O'Connor 0-7, T Carmody 1-2, A Markham 0-5, P J O'Connell 1-0, O Baker (f), T Griffin, K Ralph 0-1.	Referee: G Devlin (Armagh)

8 April 2001	Galway	3-25 - 1-6	Meath	Dunlo GAA Grounds, Ballinasloe
	A Kerins 2-5, L Burke 0-10 (9f), D O'Shaughnessy 1-5, K Broderick 0-2, N Linnane, P Walsh, G Lynskey 0-1 each.	Report	P Potterton 0-5 (4f), J Canty 1-0, T Reilly 0-1 (f).	Referee: G Devlin (Armagh)

8 April 2001	Antrim	2-15 - 3-14	Dublin	Casement Park, Belfast
	G O’Kane 2-7, B McFall 0-3, J McIntosh 0-2, R McNaughton 0-1, P Graham 0-1, C Herron 0-1.		D Donnelly 1-2, C Ring 0-5, D Henry 1-1, D Russell 1-1, S McDonald 0-2, L Ryan 0-2, D Sweeney 0-1.	Referee: B Kelly (Westmeath)

15 April 2001	Clare	0-21 - 1-13	Offaly	Cusack Park, Ennis
	J O’Connor 0-7, A Markham 0-5, N Gilligan 0-5, D Forde 0-1, O Baker 0-1, C Lynch 0-1, G Considine 0-1.		J Dooley 1-5, J Pilkington 0-3, G Hanniffy 0-2, C Cassidy 0-2, Barry Whelahan 0-1.	Referee: G Harrington (Cork)

15 April 2001	Dublin	2-11 - 1-24	Limerick	Parnell Park, Dublin
	T McGrane 0-6 (3f, 65), D Russell 1-1, D Donnelly 1-0, S Martin, D Sweeney, L Ryan, E Carroll 0-1 each.	Report	M Keane 0-10 (7f), B Begley 0-5, B Foley 1-2, O Moran 0-2, J Butler 0-2, M Foley 0-2 (1f, 65), J Foley 0-1.	Referee: D Murphy (Wexford)

19 April 2001	Limerick	1-13 - 3-21	Clare	Gaelic Grounds, Limerick
	B Foley 1-1 (0-1 pen), M Keane 0-3 (2f), P O'Grady, J Butler, E O' Neill 0-2 each, J Moran, O Moran, B Begley 0-1 each.	Report	N Gilligan 2-2, D Forde 1-3, J O'Connor 0-6 (4f), B Murphy 0-3, T Griffin 0-2, D Hoey, G Considine, C Lynch, A Markham, T Carmody 0-1 each.	Referee: J McDonnell (Tipperary)

22 April 2001	Offaly	2-22 - 0-8	Dublin	St. Brendan's Park, Birr
	J Dooley 1-6, R Hanniffy 1-1, S Whelehan 0-3, G Hanniffy 0-3, J Pilkington 0-2, G Oakley 0-2, J Errity 0-1, J Troy 0-1, A Hanrahan 0-1.		K Flynn 0-5, L Ryan 0-2, E Carroll 0-1.	Referee: P Neary (Kilkenny)

22 April 2001	Limerick	1-18 - 1-16	Meath	FitzGerald Park, Kilmallock
	P Tobin 1-3, B Foley 0-4, M Keane 0-3, O O’Neill 0-2, P O’Grady 0-2, O Moran 0-1, C Carey 0-1, B Begley 0-1, J Butler 0-1.		F Mahon 0-8, K Dowd 1-0, P Potterton 0-3, N Horan 0-2, R Dorran 0-1, N Reilly 0-1, G Cole 0-1.	Referee: D Kirwan (Cork)

=== Division 1B ===
	Team	Pld	W	D	L	SF	SA	SD	Pts
1	Tipperary (C)	6	5	1	0	6-97	6-66	31	11
2	Kilkenny	6	4	1	1	8-83	2-64	37	9
3	Cork	6	4	0	2	12-88	3-72	40	8
4	Wexford '	6	3	0	3	9-82	6-73	18	6
5	Waterford	6	3	0	3	12-83	9-73	19	6
6	Derry	6	1	0	5	3-48	15-110	-98	2
7	Laois	6	0	0	6	2-58	14-91	-79	0

4 February 2001	Laois	0-9 - 2-10	Wexford	Kelly Daly Park, Rathdowney
	D Cuddy (0-5, three frees), E Meagher (0-1), C Cuddy (0-1), F O'Sullivan (0-1), J Young (0-1).	Report	C McGrath (0-5, frees), L O'Gorman (1-0), A Fenlon (1-0), R McCarthy (0-1), M Byrne (0-1), M Jacob (0-1), P Finn (0-1), B Goff (0-1).	Referee: J Sexton (Limerick)

4 February 2001	Waterford	3-17 - 0-8	Derry	Fraher Field, Dungarvan
	K McGrath 1-6 (1-2 frees, 0-1 '65'); S Prendergast 1-1, C Murray 1-0 (og), J Mullane, P Walsh, D Bennett and P Flynn 0-2 each, E Kelly and P Prendergast 0-1 each.	Report	O Collins 0-5 (0-4 frees), J O'Dwyer 0-2, M Conway 0-1.	Referee: P Dunphy (Kilkenny)

11 February 2001	Kilkenny	3-16 - 0-11	Laois	Nowlan Park, Kilkenny
	H Shefflin 1-5, T Drennan 2-1, J Coogan 0-4, D J Carey, J Hoyne 0-2 each, S Grehan, J P Corcoran 0-1 each.		D Cuddy 0-6, D Conroy 0-2, N Rigney, R Delaney, C Cuddy 0-1 each.	Referee: S Roche (Tipperary)

11 February 2001	Derry	0-6 - 2-15	Tipperary	Emmett Park, Slaughneil
	O Collins (0-4), P Kelly (0-1), J O'Dwyer (0-1).	Report	L Cahill (0-7), L Corbett (1-1), J Carroll (1-0), B O'Meara (0-3), M O'Leary (0-2), M Ryan (0-1), E Kelly (0-1).	Referee: B Kelly (Westmeath)

18 February 2001	Laois	0-7 - 4-18	Cork	O'Moore Park, Portlaoise
	D Cuddy 0-5, J O'Shea, C Cleere 0-1 each.	Report	J Deane 2-4, K Murray, S McGrath 1-2 each, B O'Connor 0-4, M Morrissey, T McCarthy 0-2 each, P Mulcahy, G O'Connor 0-1 each.	Referee: J McDonald (Tipperary)

18 February 2001	Waterford	0-8 - 2-14	Kilkenny	Walsh Park, Waterford
	T Browne (0-3, one free), D Bennett (0-2, one free), K McGrath (0-1), S Prendergast (0-1), D Shanahan (0-1).	Report	DJ Carey (1-3), H Shefflin (1-2 two frees), A Geoghegan (0-3), JP Corcoran (0-2), S Grehan (0-2), J Coogan (0-1), T Drennan (0-1).	Referee: D Kirwan (Cork)

18 February 2001	Tipperary	1-16 - 1-12	Wexford	Semple Stadium, Thurles
	E O'Neill 0-6 (4f), L Cahill 0-4, L Corbett 1-1, E Corcoran 0-3 (1f, 2 '65), M Ryan, J O'Brien 0-1.	Report	L O'Gorman 1-1, C McGrath (3f), P Codd 0-3 each, L Dunne 0-2 (f), M Jordan, R Stafford, B Goff 0-1.	Referee: P Dunphy (Kilkenny)

24 February 2001	Cork	1-10 - 0-12	Kilkenny	Páirc Uí Chaoimh, Cork
	S McGrath 1-1, J Deane 0-2, J O’Connor 0-1, K Murray 0-1, B Corcoran 0-1, S Óg Ó hAilpín 0-1, B O’Connor 0-1, T McCarthy 0-1, M Morrissey 0-1.		H Shefflin 0-5, S Grehan 0-3, A Geoghegan 0-1, JP Corcoran 0-1, C Carter 0-1, J Barron 0-1.	Referee: M Wadding (Waterford)

25 February 2001	Wexford	0-13 - 3-13	Waterford	Ramsfort Park, Gorey
	P Codd 0-10, R Stafford 0-1, M Jacob 0-1, G Laffan 0-1.		P Flynn 1-5, S Prendergast 2-1, J Mullane 0-3, K McGrath 0-3, E Murphy 0-1.	Referee: G Harrington (Cork)

1 April 2001	Derry	1-16 - 1-12	Laois	Páirc Uí Chatháin, Dungiven
	J O’Dwyer 1-4, O Collins 0-7, G Biggs 0-3, M Collins 0-2.		D Cuddy 0-5, C Clear 1-0, N Rigney 0-2, P Cuddy 0-2, C Cuddy 0-1, D Conroy 0-1, F O’Sullivan 0-1.	Referee: T McIntyre (Antrim)

1 April 2001	Tipperary	5-15 - 2-15	Waterford	MacDonagh Park, Nenagh
	E O'Neill 1-4 (3fs), B O'Meara 2-0, L Cahill 1-2, L Corbett 1-1, E Corcoran 0-4 (all fs), E Enright 0-2, M Ryan 0-1, T Dunne 0-1 ('65).	Report	P Flynn 1-9 (5f), K McGrath 1-1, T Browne 0-2, E Murphy, D Bennett, D Shanahan 0-1 each.	Referee: S McMahon (Clare)

1 April 2001	Wexford	2-14 - 1-9	Cork	Enniscorthy
	P Codd 1-6, P Finn 1-0, B Goff 0-2, C Byrne 0-2, D Stamp 0-2, A Fenlon 0-1, R McCarthy 0-1.	Report	J Deane 0-6, S McGrath 1-0, P Ryan 0-1, K Murray 0-1, N Ronan 0-1.	Referee: J Sexton (Limerick)

8 April 2001	Cork	1-17 - 1-15	Waterford	Páirc Uí Chaoimh, Cork
	J Deane 0-7, S McGrath 0-4, A Browne 1-0, K Murray 0-2, M O'Connell 0-1, N Ronan 0-1, B O'Connor 0-1, G O'Connor 0-1.	Report	P Flynn 1-6, J Mullane 0-3, D Bennett 0-2, T Browne 0-2, P Queally 0-1, K McGrath 0-1.

8 April 2001	Wexford	4-20 - 1-7	Derry	Enniscorthy
	C Byrne 2-5, D Stamp 1-3, P Codd 0-5 (5 frees), P Finn 1-1, R McCarthy 0-2, B Goff 0-2, M Jacob 0-1.	Report	G Buggy 0-5 (frees), M Collins 1-1, D McGrellis 0-1.	Referee: JM Kelly (Waterford)

8 April 2001	Kilkenny	1-12 - 0-15	Tipperary	Nowlan Park, Kilkenny
	H Shefflin 1-4, A Cummins 0-3, C Brennan 0-1, A Geoghegan 0-1, J Power 0-1, C Carter 0-1, J Coogan 0-1.		E O’Neill 0-5, L Corbett 0-3, L Cahill 0-2, M O’Leary 0-2, E Enright 0-1, T Dunne 0-1, P Kelly 0-1.	Referee: G Harrington (Cork)

15 April 2001	Waterford	3-15 - 1-6	Laois	Fraher Field, Dungarvan
	J Mullane 1-3, S Prendergast 1-1, P Flynn 0-4 (frees), D Bennett 0-3, A Kirwan 1-0, F Hartley 0-2, T Browne and P Prendergast 0-1 each.	Report	J Young 1-0, D Cuddy 0-3 (frees), C Coonan 0-2, P Cuddy 0-1.	Referee: D Kirwan (Cork)

15 April 2001	Tipperary	0-20 - 2-8	Cork	Fraher Field, Dungarvan
	E Kelly 0-5 (0-2 frees), M O'Leary 0-4, L Cahill and D Ryan 0-3 each, C Gleeson, N Morris, E Enright and J Leahy 0-1 each. P Kelly 0-1 ('65').	Report	A Browne 2-2, J O'Connor 0-2, M Landers, K Murray and P Ryan 0-1 each. J Deane 0-1 (free).	Referee: P Horan (Offaly)

15 April 2001	Derry	1-7 - 2-20	Kilkenny	Dean McGlinchey Park, Ballinascreen
	M Collins 1-1; O Collins 0-3; J O'Dwyer 0-2; G Biggs 0-1.	Report	J Coogan 0-7; D Buggy 1-1; J Barron 1-0; D Lyng, JP Corcoran 0-3 each; C Carter 0-2; E Kennedy, A Cummins, A Geoghan, S Meally 0-1 each.	Referee: J McLean (Antrim)

21 April 2001	Laois	0-13 - 1-16	Tipperary	O'Moore Park, Portlaoise
	D Cuddy 0-4, C Cuddy 0-3, J Phelan 0-2, F O’Sullivan 0-2, D Conroy 0-1, C Coonan 0-1.		D Ryan 1-3, E O’Neill 0-5, L Cahill 0-2, T Dunne, 0-2, N Morris 0-2, J O’Brien 0-2.

22 April 2001	Cork	3-26 - 0-4	Derry	Páirc Uí Rinn, Cork
	B O’Keeffe 3-3, E Fitzgerald 0-6, N Ronan 0-5, J Deane 0-4, A Browne 0-3, M O’Connell 0-3, W Sherlock 0-1, J O’Connor 0-1.		M Collins 0-2, F McElowney 0-1, M Conway 0-1.	Referee: P Ahern (Carlow)

22 April 2001	Kilkenny	0-19 - 0-13	Wexford	Nowlan Park, Kilkenny
	J Coogan 0-10, D Buggy 0-3, A Geoghegan 0-2, A Comerford 0-1, D Lyng 0-1, P Larkin 0-1, E Kennedy 0-1.		P Codd 0-6, B Goff 0-4, C Byrne 0-1, M Jordan 0-1, D Stamp 0-1.	Referee: P O'Connor (Limerick)

=== Knock-out stage ===
Semi-finals

28 April 2001 Semi-final	Galway	1-15 - 2-19	Tipperary	Cusack Park, Ennis
	M Kerins (1-3), E Cloonan (0- 5, four frees), L Burke (0-2, two frees), A Kerins (0-2), D Tierney (0-1); O Fahy (0-1), F Healy (0-1).	Report	M O'Leary (0-7, two frees), D Ryan (1-1), L Corbett (1-1), E Kelly (0-4, one free), E Enright (0-2), L Cahill (0-2), E O'Neill (0-1), J O'Brien (0-1).	Referee: P Ahern (Carlow)

29 April 2001 Semi-final	Clare	2-21 - 3-8	Kilkenny	Semple Stadium, Thurles
	N Gilligan 0-7 (0-2 fs), B Murphy 1-3, J O'Connor 1-3 (0-2 both fs), G Considine 0-2, O Baker 0-2 (1 '65'), C Lynch, D Forde, T Griffin and C Clancy 0-1 each.	Report	J Coogan 1-4 (3 fs), E Brennan and A Comerford 1-0 each, J Power, S Grehan, D Byrne 0-1 each, E Kennedy 0-1 ('65').	Referee: P Horan (Offaly)

Final

6 May 2001 Final	Tipperary	1-19 - 0-17	Clare	Gaelic Grounds, Limerick
	E Kelly 0-5 (2f), L Corbett 0-4, D Ryan 1-1, E Enright, M O'Leary 0-3 each, T Dunne 0-2 (2f), B O'Meara 0-1.	Report	J O'Connor 0-6 (3f), N Gilligan 0-3 (2f), O Baker, A Markham 0-2 each, D Forde, C Lynch, B Murphy, S McMahon (f) 0-1 each.	Attendance: 25,142; Referee: P O'Connor (Limerick)

=== Statistics ===
Top scorer overall

Rank	Player	Team	Tally	Total	Matches	Average
1	Paul Flynn	Waterford	3-26	35	6	5.83
2	Paul Codd	Wexford	1-30	33	5	6.60
2	Mark Keane	Limerick	1-30	33	6	5.50
4	Jamesie O'Connor	Clare	1-29	32	6	5.33
5	Barry Foley	Limerick	5-15	30	7	4.28
5	Joe Deane	Cork	2-24	30	6	5.00
5	Alan Markham	Clare	2-24	30	7	4.28
5	Jimmy Coogan	Kilkenny	1-27	30	7	4.28

Single game

Rank	Player	Club	Tally	Total	Opposition
1	Damien Murray	Offaly	0-14	14	Galway
2	Greg O'Kane	Antrim	2-7	13	Dublin
3	Brian O'Keeffe	Cork	3-3	12	Derry
3	Mark Keane	Limerick	1-9	12	Antrim
3	Paul Flynn	Waterford	1-9	12	Tipperary
6	Alan Kerins	Galway	2-5	11	Antrim
6	Colm Byrne	Wexford	2-5	11	Derry
8	Joe Deane	Cork	2-4	10	Laois
8	Mark Keane	Limerick	0-10	10	Dublin
8	Paul Codd	Wexford	0-10	10	Waterford
8	Jimmy Coogan	Kilkenny	0-10	10	Wexford

== Division 2 ==
=== Division 2 table ===
Pos	Team	Pld	W	D	L	Pts	Notes
1	Kerry	9	7	1	1	15	Division 2 champions
2	Westmeath	7	5	2	0	12	Division 2 runners-up
3	Kildare	6	3	1	2	7	
4	Wicklow	6	3	1	2	7	
5	Down	5	1	2	2	4	
6	London	3	1	1	1	3	
7	Carlow	5	1	0	4	2	
8	Louth	3	1	0	2	2	
9	Roscommon	6	0	1	5	1	
10	Armagh	4	0	1	3	1	

=== Knock-out stage ===
5 August 2001 Final	Kerry	4-14 – 3-10	Westmeath	Croke Park, Dublin

== Division 3 ==
=== Division 3 table ===
Pos	Team	Pld	W	D	L	Pts	Notes
1	Fermanagh	8	7	0	1	14	Division 3 runners-up
2	Donegal	7	6	0	1	12	Division 3 champions
3	Sligo	7	5	0	2	10	
4	Longford	7	4	1	2	9	
5	Leitrim	8	2	2	4	6	
6	Tyrone	6	2	1	3	5	
7	Mayo	7	1	2	3	4	
8	Monaghan	8	0	2	6	2	
9	Cavan	6	0	1	5	1	

=== Knock-out stage ===
7 July 2001 Final	Donegal	3-13 – 2-10	Fermanagh	Breffni Park, Cavan
		Report
