= Tommy Naughton =

Irish hurling manager

Personal information
- Born: Wicklow, Ireland

Sport
- Sport: Hurling
Club management
- Years: Club
- Scoil Uí Chonaill
Inter-county management
- Years: Team
- 2005–2008: Dublin
Inter-county titles as manager
County	League	Province	All-Ireland

Tommy Naughton is the former manager of the Dublin Senior Hurling Team and the former manager of the county's under-21 team as well. He had also previously been a selector with the senior hurling team. Naughton had Andy Cunningham, Mick O'Riordan and Damien Byrne as his management team for Dublin.

== Managerial career ==
=== Dublin ===
==== 2006 ====
After being appointed manager in late 2005, Naughton guided Dublin to the 2006 National Hurling League Division 2 title. This title win ensured Dublin a place in Division One for 2007. The Liam MacCarthy Cup proved a difficult period for Naughton as his team failed to win a game in the competition until the relegation match against Westmeath. Dublin managed to retain their McCarthy Cup status for the 2007 season, leaving Westmeath to play in the Christy Ring Cup in 2007.

==== 2007 ====
Naughton's 2007 season opened with a draw against Kilkenny in that year's edition of the National Hurling League (NHL). Naughton's Dublin then defeated Galway at Parnell Park, which left his team in fourth position with one game in hand. Dublin continued their unbeaten run by defeating Limerick in the NHL. That victory left Naughton's Dublin side in third position in the league, with a game in hand over Antrim. Dublin lost the game against Antrim, and then lost their final game against Tipperary, which meant that Dublin missed a chance to qualify for the quarter-finals or semi-finals.

Naughton's first match against Wexford was seen as the potential breakthrough match for Dublin's young senior hurling team in the All-Ireland Senior Hurling Championship (SHC). Dublin showed that the gap is lessening between themselves and the bigger teams, but Wexford came out of the game with a one-point win following a late point scored by Barry Lambert. Naughton's hurlers then had to play in the All-Ireland SHC qualifiers against Cork, Offaly and Limerick or Tipperary. The Dublin team were scheduled to play their first game against Cork at Parnell Park. Cork wrote a letter to the Competitions Control Committee to request that the game be played at a neutral venue, this was met with anger by both the Offaly and the Dublin managers, who were playing at home on the first weekend of the qualifiers. A change of venue never materialised and Cork played Dublin at Parnell Park, with Cork winning by 3–20 to 0–15. Dublin's next game in the qualifiers was against Tipperary, who had previously beaten Dublin in the league. Naughton's men put on a good performance against Tipperary but faded towards the end, leaving Dublin at the bottom of the table.

Sporting positions
Preceded by John Bailey; Mick O'Riordan; Tommy Ryan	Dublin Senior Hurling Manager; 2005–2008	Succeeded by Anthony Daly
