= Paul Carley =

Irish hurler and manager

Personal information
- Born: 1980 (age 45–46) Barntown, County Wexford, Ireland

Sport
- Sport: Hurling
- Position: Right wing-forward
Club
- Years: Club
- Glynn-Barntown
Club titles
- Wexford titles: 0
Inter-county
- Years: County
- 1999-2009: Wexford
Inter-county titles
- Leinster titles: 1
- All-Irelands: 0
- NHL: 0
- All Stars: 0

Paul Carley (born 1980) is an Irish hurling manager and former player who is, as of 2021, the joint-manager of the Wexford minor hurling team. At club level he played with Glynn-Barntown and was also a member of the Wexford senior hurling team.

== Playing career ==
Carley played at juvenile and underage levels with the Glynn-Barntown club before eventually joining the club's top adult team. He first appeared on the inter-county scene at minor level with Wexford before lining out in the 2001 All-Ireland under-21 final defeat by Limerick. By this stage Carley had been drafted onto the Wexford senior hurling team where he began his career as a goalkeeper. Over the course of the following decade he was a regular on the team and won a Leinster Championship medal in 2004.

== Managerial career ==
Carley has been involved in team management and coaching since his retirement from playing. At club level he has taken charge of several clubs in different counties, including Ballygarrett Realt na Mara, Ballyboden St Enda's, Bray Emmets and Passage. At inter-county level Carley has previously been part of the Wexford minor management team before becoming joint-manager in 2018.

== Honours ==
Wexford

- Leinster Senior Hurling Championship: 2004
- Leinster Under-21 Hurling Championship: 2001
