= U21HC =

U21HC stands for Under-21 Hurling Championship, which refers to a variety of events of the Gaelic Athletic Association (some of which are now Under-20), including:

- All-Ireland Under-21 Hurling Championship
- Leinster Under-21 Hurling Championship
- Ulster Under-21 Hurling Championship
- Munster Under-21 Hurling Championship
- Connacht Under-21 Hurling Championship
