= Timmy Houlihan =

Irish hurler

Personal information
- Native name: Tadhg Ó hUallacháin (Irish)
- Nickname: Hoola
- Born: 9 March 1982 (age 44) Adare, County Limerick, Ireland
- Occupation: Engineer
- Height: 5 ft 11 in (180 cm)

Sport
- Sport: Hurling
- Position: Goalkeeper
Club
- Years: Club
- Adare
Club titles
- Limerick titles: 5
College
- Years: College
- University of Limerick
College titles
- Fitzgibbon titles: 1
Inter-county
Years	County	Apps (scores)
2001-2006; 2010	Limerick	15 (0-0)
Inter-county titles
- Munster titles: 0
- All-Irelands: 0

Timothy Houlihan (born 9 March 1982) is an Irish hurling coach and former player. At club level, he played with Adare and at inter-county level with the Limerick senior hurling team. Houlihan later served as a goalkeeping coach.

== Playing career ==
Houlihan played hurling at all grades as a student at CBS Sexton Street in Limerick. He later studied at University of Limerick and was goalkeeper on the UL team that beat Waterford Institute of Technology by 2–14 to 2–11 to claim the Fitzgibbon Cup title in 2002.

At club level, Houlihan first played for Adare at juvenile and underage levels. He was part of a very successful underage set-up that saw him win consecutive Limerick MHC medals in 1998 and 1999, as well as consecutive Limerick U21HC titles in 1999 and 2000. He progressed to the club's senior side and was involved in five Limerick SHC-winning teams between 2001 and 2009.

At inter-county level, Houlihan first played for Limerick as goalkeeper with the minor team in 2000. He was also drafted onto the under-21 team that year and won three successive All-Ireland U21HC medals, including one as team captain in 2001. Houlihan made his senior team debut in 2001. He made a number of appearances but left the panel after being replaced as goalkeeper by Brian Murray in 2006. Houlihan made a brief return to the Limerick panel in 2010.

== Coaching career ==
Houlihan was goalkeeping coach as part of John Kiely's staff with the Limerick senior hurling for a number of years. During his time with the team, Limerick won five All-Ireland SHC titles in a six-year period.

== Honours ==
=== Player ===
University of Limerick

- Fitzgibbon Cup: 2002

Adare

- Limerick Senior Hurling Championship: 2001, 2002, 2007, 2008, 2009
- Limerick Under-21 Hurling Championship: 1999, 2000
- Limerick Minor Hurling Championship: 1998, 1999

Limerick

- All-Ireland Under-21 Hurling Championship: 2000, 2001 (c), 2002
- Munster Under-21 Hurling Championship: 2000, 2001 (c), 2002

=== Coach ===
Limerick

- All-Ireland Senior Hurling Championship: 2018, 2020, 2021, 2022, 2023
- Munster Senior Hurling Championship: 2019, 2020, 2021, 2022, 2023
- National Hurling League: 2019, 2020

Sporting positions
Preceded by Donncha Sheehan	Limerick under-21 hurling team captain 2001	Succeeded by Peter Lawlor
Achievements
Preceded by Donncha Sheehan	All-Ireland Under-21 Hurling Final winning captain 2001	Succeeded by Peter Lawlor
