= 2001 All-Ireland Under-21 Hurling Championship final =

2001 All-Ireland Under-21 Hurling Championship Final
- Event: 2001 All-Ireland Under-21 Hurling Championship
Limerick	Wexford
0-17	2-10
- Date: 16 September 2001
- Venue: Semple Stadium, Thurles
- Referee: Aodán Mac Suibhne (Dublin)

The 2001 All-Ireland Under-21 Hurling Championship final was a hurling match that was played at Semple Stadium, Thurles on 16 September 2001 to determine the winners of the 2001 All-Ireland Under-21 Hurling Championship, the 38th season of the All-Ireland Under-21 Hurling Championship, a tournament organised by the Gaelic Athletic Association for the champion teams of the four provinces of Ireland. The final was contested by Limerick of Munster and Wexford of Leinster, with Limerick winning by 0–17 to 2–10.

== Match ==
=== Details ===
16 September 2001

Limerick	0-17 - 2-10	Wexford
M Keane 0-7, C Fitzgerald 0-3, N Moran 0-2, K Tobin 0-2, E Foley 0-2, S Lucey 0-1.		P Carley 1-2, M Jacob 1-1, R Jacob 0-3, G Coleman 0-2, B Lambert 0-2.

Semple Stadium, Thurles
Referee: A Mac Suibhne (Dublin)
