= 2001 All-Ireland Under-21 Hurling Championship =

All-Ireland Under-21 Hurling Championship 2001
Championship Details
- Dates: 6 June 2001 – 16 September 2001
- Teams: 15

All Ireland Champions
- Winners: Limerick (3rd win)
- Captain: Timmy Houlihan
- Manager: Dave Keane

All Ireland Runners-up
- Runners-up: Wexford
- Captain: Nicky Lambert
- Manager: Séamus Murphy

Provincial Champions
- Munster: Limerick
- Leinster: Wexford
- Ulster: Antrim
- Connacht: Not Played

Championship Statistics
- Matches Played: 14
- Top Scorer: Mark Keane (3-29)

The 2001 All-Ireland Under-21 Hurling Championship was the 38th staging of the All-Ireland Under-21 Hurling Championship, the Gaelic Athletic Association's premier inter-county hurling tournament for players under the age of twenty-one. The championship began on 6 June 2001 and ended on 16 September 2001.

Limerick were the defending champions.

On 16 September 2001, Limerick won the championship following a 0-17 to 2-10 defeat of Wexford in the All-Ireland final. This was their second All-Ireland title in succession and their third title overall.

Limerick's Mark Keane was the championship's top scorer with 3-29.

== Results ==
=== Leinster Under-21 Hurling Championship ===
Quarter-finals

6 June 2001 Quarter-final	Carlow	0-4 - 0-12	Laois	Dr. Cullen Park, Carlow
	K English 0-2, T Walsh 0-1, J Coady 0-1.		B McCormack 0-8, J Phelan 0-2, R Jones 0-1, D Keenan 0-1.	Referee: J McGrath (Westmeath)

13 June 2001 Quarter-final	Wexford	1-12 - 1-10	Dublin	Nowlan Park, Kilkenny
	M Jacob 1-0, B Lambert 0-3, R Barry 0-3, P Carley 0-3, D Stamp 0-1, N Lambert 0-1, D Mythen 0-1.		C Kearney 0-4, P Murray 1-0, D Donnelly 0-3, D Russell 0-1, D Heffernan 0-1, F Armstong 0-1.	Referee: P Neary (Kilkenny)

Semi-finals

20 June 2001 Semi-final	Kilkenny	2-16 - 1-11	Laois	Dr. Cullen Park, Carlow
	P Sheehan 0-7, K Power 1-3, B Phelan 1-1, C Herity 0-2, A Fogarty 0-2, B Phelan 0-1,		B McCormack 0-9, C Clear 1-0, J Phelan 0-1, B McCormack 0-1.	Referee: D O'Donovan (Dublin)

20 June 2001 Semi-final	Wexford	2-11 - 1-13	Offaly	Nowlan Park, Kilkenny
	D Lyng 1-2, G Coleman 1-1, B Lambert 0-4, D Stamp 0-2, R Barry 0-1, N Lambert 0-1.		D Murray 0-5, K Kelly 1-0, R Hanniffy 0-2, C Gath 0-2, M Cordial 0-2, D Tanner 0-1, B Carroll 0-1.	Referee: P Dunphy (Kilkenny)

Final

11 July 2001 Final	Wexford	0-10 - 1-5	Kilkenny	Wexford Park, Wexford
	B Lambert 0-4, D Lyng 0-1, N Lambert 0-1, D Stamp 0-1, R Barry 0-1, R Jacob 0-1, M Jacob 0-1.		E Walsh 1-0, P Sheehan 0-2, A Fogarty 0-2, K Power 0-1.	Referee: E Morris (Dublin)

=== Munster Under-21 Hurling Championship ===
Quarter-finals

13 June 2001 Quarter-final	Kerry	1-4 - 5-24	Cork	Austin Stack Park, Tralee
	S Brick 1-3, L Boyle 0-1.		C McCarthy 2-5, M O’Connor 1-1, E Fitzgerald 0-4, W Deasy 1-0, E Collins 1-0, J Barrett 0-3, J Olden 0-3, N McCarthy 0-3, JP King 0-2, V Cusack 0-2, R O’Doherty 0-1.	Referee: D O'Driscoll (Limerick)

13 June 2001 Quarter-final	Tipperary	0-19 - 0-12	Clare	Semple Stadium, Thurles
	E Kelly 0-10, J O’Brien 0-6, S Butler 0-2, D Shelley 0-1.		D Quinn 0-5, G Considine 0-4, T Griffin 0-2, B Culbert 0-1.	Referee: G Harrington (Cork)

Semi-finals

11 July 2001 Semi-final	Waterford	0-13 - 1-17	Tipperary	Fraher Field, Dungarvan
	S Prendergast 0-8, J Mullane 0-2, E Kelly 0-1, S Barron 0-1, G Power 0-1.		E Kelly 0-8, D Shelley 0-4, L Corbett 1-0, E Brislane 0-2, S Butler 0-2, K Cummins 0-1.	Referee: S McMahon (Clare)

12 July 2001 Semi-final	Cork	2-11 - 0-18	Limerick	Páirc Uí Chaoimh, Cork
	E Fitzgerald 0-6, N McCarthy 1-1, E Collins 1-0, C McCarthy 0-1, J Barrett 0-1, M O’Connor 0-1, J Olden 0-1.		M Keane 0-11, D Reale 0-1, K Tobin 0-1, S Lucey 0-1, E Foley 0-1, N Moran 0-1, C Fitzgerald 0-1, P Tobin 0-1.	Referee: S Roche (Tipperary)

Final

2 August 2001 Final	Limerick	3-14 - 2-16	Tipperary	Gaelic Grounds, Limerick
	M Keane 2-7, C Fitzgerald 1-2, K Tobin 0-2, S Lucey 0-1, E Foley 0-1, S O’Connor 0-1.		E Kelly 2-9, S Butler 0-3, L Corbett 0-2, D Shelley 0-1, C Houlihan 0-1.	Referee: G Harrington (Cork)

=== Ulster Under-21 Hurling Championship ===
22 July 2001 Final	Antrim	2-16 - 1-18	Derry	St. Tiernach's Park, Clones
	L Watson 1-3; P Kelly 1-0; C Heron, G Bell, C McGourty 0-3 each; S Delargy 0-2; B Quinn, K Stewart 0-1 each.		P Hearty 1-12; K Hinphey, A McCloskey, P Doherty, C McKeever, S Kelly, F McEldowney 0-1 each.	Referee: G Devlin (Armagh)

=== All-Ireland Under-21 Hurling Championship ===
Semi-finals

25 August 2001 Semi-final	Wexford	2-17 - 1-5	Antrim	Parnell Park, Dublin
	B Lambert 0-9, T Mahon 1-0, D Stamp 1-0, R Jacob 0-3, R Barry 0-2, D Lyng 0-2, P Carley 0-1.		S Delargy 1-0, D MacAuley 0-1, C McGourty 0-1, L Watson 0-1, C O’Connell 0-1, C O’Grady 0-1.

25 August 2001 Semi-final	Limerick	1-13 - 2-6	Galway	Cusack Park, Ennis
	M Keane 1-4, E Foley 0-2, K Tobin 0-2, P Tobin 0-1, C Fitzgerald 0-1, N Moran 0-1, P Lawlor 0-1, A O’Shaughnessy 0-1.		D Hayes 1-1, D Huban 1-0, K Brady 0-2, D Donoghue 0-1, R Murray 0-1, G Farragher 0-1.	Referee: B Kelly (Westmeath)

Final

16 September 2001 Final	Limerick	0-17 - 2-10	Wexford	Semple Stadium, Thurles
	M Keane 0-7, C Fitzgerald 0-3, N Moran 0-2, E Foley 0-2, K Tobin 0-2, S Lucey 0-1.		P Carley 1-2, M Jacob 1-1, R Jacob 0-3, B Lambert 0-2, G Coleman 0-2.	Attendance: 31,413; Referee: A Mac Suibhne (Dublin)

== Scoring statistics ==
Top scorers overall

Rank	Player	County	Tally	Total	Matches	Average
1	Mark Keane	Limerick	3-29	38	4	9.50
2	Eoin Kelly	Tipperary	2-27	33	3	11.00
3	Barry Lambert	Wexford	0-22	22	5	4.40
4	Brian McCormack	Laois	0-17	17	2	8.50
5	Paul Hearty	Derry	1-12	15	1	15.00
6	Cathal McCarthy	Cork	2-06	12	2	6.00
7	Conor Fitzgerald	Limerick	1-07	10	4	2.50
7	Eoin Fitzgerald	Cork	0-10	10	2	5.00
9	Paul Carley	Wexford	1-06	9	5	1.80
9	Paul Sheehan	Kilkenny	0-09	9	2	4.50

Top scorers in a single game

Rank	Player	County	Tally	Total	Opposition
1	Eoin Kelly	Tipperary	2-09	15	Limerick
1	Paul Hearty	Derry	1-12	15	Antrim
3	Mark Keane	Limerick	2-07	13	Tipperary
4	Cathal McCarthy	Cork	2-05	11	Kerry
4	Mark Keane	Limerick	0-11	11	Cork
6	Eoin Kelly	Tipperary	0-10	10	Clare
7	Brian McCormack	Laois	0-09	9	Kilkenny
7	Barry Lambert	Wexford	0-09	9	Antrim
9	Séamus Prendergast	Waterford	0-08	8	Tipperary
9	Eoin Kelly	Tipperary	0-08	8	Waterford
