= Conor Gath =

Irish hurler

Personal information
- Born: 17 November 1980 (age 45) Drumcullen, County Offaly, Ireland
- Height: 5 ft 10 in (178 cm)

Sport
- Sport: Hurling
- Position: Right corner-forward
Club
- Years: Club
- 1998-present: Drumcullen
Club titles
- Offaly titles: 0
Inter-county
Years	County	Apps (scores)
2000-2004	Offaly	5 (0-5)
Inter-county titles
- Leinster titles: 0
- All-Irelands: 0
- NHL: 0
- All Stars: 0

Conor Gath (born 17 November 1980 in Drumcullen, County Offaly, Ireland) is an Irish sportsperson. He plays hurling with his local club Drumcullen and was a member of the Offaly senior inter-county team from 2000 until 2004.
