= Michael Cordial =

Irish hurler

Personal information
- Born: 1982 (age 43–44) Shinrone, County Offaly, Ireland

Sport
- Sport: Hurling
- Position: Midfield
Club
- Years: Club
- Shinrone
Club titles
- Offaly titles: 0
Inter-county
Years	County	Apps (scores)
2002-2011	Offaly	23 (4-22)
Inter-county titles
- Leinster titles: 0
- All-Irelands: 0
- NHL: 0
- All Stars: 0

Michael Cordial (born 1982) is an Irish former hurler. At club level he played with Shinrone and was also a member of the Offaly senior hurling team.

== Playing career ==
Cordial first played hurling at juvenile and underage levels with the Shinrone club, before joining the club's top adult team. He first appeared on the inter-county scene with the Offaly minor team that won the Leinster Championship in 2000. Cordial was drafted onto the Offaly senior hurling team in 2002. Over the course of the following decade he was a regular on the team.

== Honours ==
Offaly

- Leinster Minor Hurling Championship: 2000
