= 2000 All-Ireland Under-21 Hurling Championship =

All-Ireland Under-21 Hurling Championship 2000
Championship Details
- Dates: 7 June 2000 – 17 September 2000
- Teams: 17

All Ireland Champions
- Winners: Limerick (2nd win)
- Captain: Donncha Sheehan
- Manager: Dave Keane

All Ireland Runners-up
- Runners-up: Galway
- Captain: Stephen Morgan
- Manager: Brendan Lynskey

Provincial Champions
- Munster: Limerick
- Leinster: Offaly
- Ulster: Antrim
- Connacht: Not Played

Championship Statistics
- Matches Played: 18
- Top Scorer: Mark Keane (3-34)

The 2000 All-Ireland Under-21 Hurling Championship was the 37th staging of the All-Ireland Under-21 Hurling Championship, the Gaelic Athletic Association's premier inter-county hurling tournament for players under the age of twenty-one. The championship began on 7 June 2000 and ended on 17 September 2000.

Kilkenny were the defending champions but were defeated by Offaly in the Leinster final.

On 17 September 2000, Limerick won the championship following a 1-13 to 0-13 defeat of Galway in the All-Ireland final. This was their second All-Ireland title and their first since 1987.

Limerick's Mark Keane was the championship's top scorer with 3-34.

== Results ==
=== Leinster Under-21 Hurling Championship ===
Quarter-finals

| 7 June 2000 Quarter-final | Westmeath | 0-10 - 1-7 | Dublin | Cusack Park, Mullingar |
| | A Mitchell 0-7, G Geoghegan 0-2, A Farrell 0-1. | | D Donnelly 1-1, S Martin 0-2, D Russell 0-2, M Thompson 0-1, D Henry 0-1. | Referee: P Delaney (Laois) |

| 7 June 2000 Quarter-final | Offaly | 1-8 - 0-9 | Wexford | Nowlan Park, Kilkenny |
| | C Gath 0-4, D Murray 0-4, P Molloy 1-0. | | M Jacob 0-5, N Higgins 0-4. | Referee: P Dunphy (Kilkenny) |

| 21 June 2000 Quarter-final replay | Dublin | 2-9 - 0-8 | Westmeath | Parnell Park, Donnycarney |
| | C Daly 1-4, D Donnelly 1-0, D Henry 0-2, E Dunne 0-1, D Russell 0-1, R Brennan 0-1. | | A Mitchell 0-4, G Geoghegan 0-2, J McGuinness 0-1, K Gavigan 0-1. |

Semi-finals

| 21 June 2000 Semi-final | Offaly | 1-17 - 1-5 | Laois | O'Connor Park, Tullamore |
| | C Gath 1-6, D Murray 0-4, B Murphy 0-3, P Molloy 0-1, G O'Connor 0-1, D Tanner 0-1, A Hanrahan 0-1. | | J Young 1-5. |

| 28 June 2000 Semi-final | Dublin | 1-6 - 1-17 | Kilkenny | Parnell Park, Donnycarney |
| | M Breathnach 1-0, D Russell 0-3, C Daly 0-2, D Henry 0-1. | | H Shefflin 0-6, A Barry 1-2, JP Corcoran 0-4, K Power 0-3, T Drennan 0-1, K Moore 0-1. | Referee: B Kelly (Westmeath) |

Final

| 15 July 2000 Final | Offaly | 3-14 - 2-14 | Kilkenny | O'Moore Park, Portlaoise |
| | B Murphy 1-3, P Molloy 1-2, E McGuinness 1-1, C Gath 0-3, D Murray 0-2, R Hanniffy 0-1, D Comerford 0-1, A Hanrahan 0-1. | | K Power 0-7, J Barron 1-2, T Drennan 1-1, P O'Brien 0-1, A Barry 0-1, M Kavanagh 0-1, JP Corcoran 0-1. | Referee: B Kelly (Westmeath) |

=== Munster Under-21 Hurling Championship ===
Quarter-finals

| 21 June 2000 Quarter-final | Clare | 5-23 - 0-6 | Kerry | Cusack Park, Mullingar |
| | R Hogan 2-5, B Cosgrove 2-1, T Griffin 0-6, B McMahon 1-2, C Earley 0-3, S Arthur 0-2, P McKeogh 0-2, T Carmody 0-1, G Quinn 0-1. | | S Brick 0-5 (4f), D Young 0-1. | Referee: M Cahill (Tipperary) |

| 21 June 2000 Quarter-final | Tipperary | 1-11 - 0-16 | Waterford | Semple Stadium, Thurles |
| | P Ryan 1-1, P O'Brien 0-4, P Kelly 0-3, E Brislane 0-1, A Kennedy 0-1, D Fahy 0-1. | | E Kelly 0-6, P Fitzgerald 0-6, J Mullane 0-2, E McGrath 0-2. |

Semi-finals

| 12 July 2000 Semi-final | Waterford | 1-15 - 1-26 | Cork | Walsh Park, Waterford |
| | P Fitzgerald 0-5, J Murray 1-0, G Power 0-3, S Prendergast 0-3, J Mullane 0-3, D Howard 0-1. | | E Fitzgerald 0-6, B O'Connor 0-5, N Ronan 0-5, C McCarthy 1-1, N McCarthy 0-2, J Egan 0-2, A O'Connor 0-2, G McCarthy 0-1, J O'Connor 0-1, M O'Callaghan 0-1. | Referee: W Barrett (Tipperary) |

| 12 July 2000 Semi-final | Clare | 0-9 - 1-9 | Limerick | Cusack Park, Ennis |
| | A Quinn 0-6, C Forde 0-1, T Griffin 0-1, B McMahon 0-1. | | P O'Geday 1-2, M Keane 0-5, D Sheehan 0-2. | Referee: J McDonnell (Tipperary) |

Finals

| 9 August 2000 Final | Cork | 1-13 - 1-13 | Limerick | Páirc Uí Chaoimh, Cork |
| | E Fitzgerald 0-4, W Deasy 1-0, J O'Connor 0-3, J Egan 0-2, B O'Connor 0-2, V Cusack 0-1, N Ronan 0-1. | | B Begley 1-0, J Meskell 0-3, D Sheehan 0-2, S O'Connor 0-2, M Keane 0-2, K Tobin 0-1, D Stapleton 0-1, S Lucey 0-1, P O'Grady 0-1. |

| 23 August 2000 Final replay | Limerick | 4-18 - 1-6 | Cork | Gaelic Grounds, Limerick |
| | M Keane 1-9 (0-5f), D Sheehan 2-0, B Begley 1-2, D Stapleton 0-5, P O'Grady 0-2. | Report | B O'Connor 0-3 (0-2f), W Deasy 1-0, R O'Doherty, S O'Connor, C McCarthy 0-1 each. | Referee: M Wadding (Waterford) |

=== Ulster Under-21 Hurling Championship ===
Semi-finals

| 8 July 2000 Semi-final | Armagh | 0-4 - 2-20 | Antrim | Athletic Grounds, Armagh |
| | G Enright 0-4. | | A Watt 1-4, C Magee 1-3, P Richmond 0-4, J Flynn 0-3, D McMullan 0-2, C McGourty 0-2, P Close 0-1, C Gallagher 0-1. |

| 8 July 2000 Semi-final | Down | 2-9 - 2-10 | Derry | McKenna Park, Ballycran |
| | P Branniff 1-6, S Clarke 1-0, R McGrattan 0-2, F Clarke 0-1. | | J McKenna 2-1, P Murphy 0-4, A Quigg 0-4, S Kelly 0-1. |

Final

| 15 July 2000 Final | Antrim | 2-14 - 0-3 | Derry | Casement Park, Belfast |
| | J Flynn 0-5, C Magee 1-1, C Gallagher 1-0, P Close, C McGourty 0-2, P Richmond 0-2, G Bell 0-1, M McCullagh 0-1. | | A Quigg 0-2, P Murphy 0-1. |

=== All-Ireland Under-21 Hurling Championship ===
Semi-finals

| 24 August 2000 Semi-final | Galway | 4-13 - 1-10 | Offaly | Gaelic Grounds, Limerick |
| | D Huban 3-3 (1-0f, 1-0 pen, 0-1f), D Donohue 0-4 (0-1f), D Tierney 1-0, S Donohue 0-2 (0-1 line ball), G Keary 0-2, D Forde 0-1, C Dervan 0-1 ('65'). | Report | D Murray 0-6 (0-3f), G O'Connor 1-0, C Gath 0-3 (0-1f, 0-1 '65'), R McRedmond 0-1. | Referee: G Devlin (Armagh) |

| 26 August 2000 Semi-final | Limerick | 1-21 - 1-9 | Antrim | Parnell Park, Donnycarney |
| | M Keane 1-10 (8f), B Begley 0-4, K Tobin 0-2, P O'Reilly 0-1, J Meskell 0-1, S Lucey 0-1, D Stapleton 0-1, D Sheehan 0-1. | | A Watt 1-2, D McMullan 0-4 (two 65s, 1f), P Richmond 0-2 (1f), M McCambridge 0-1. | Referee: P Ahern (Carlow) |

Final

| 17 September 2000 Final | Limerick | 1-13 - 0-13 | Galway | Semple Stadium, Thurles |
| | M Keane 1-8 (7f), S Lucey, P O'Grady, S O'Connor, D Stapleton, D Sheehan 0-1 each. | Report | D Donoghue 0-6 (5f), E Donoghue 0-2, D Huban, S Morgan (f), S Donoghue, M Greaney, D Hardiman 0-1 each. | Referee: P Horan (Offaly) |

== Championship statistics ==
=== Top scorers ===
Top scorers overall

| Rank | Player | County | Tally | Total | Matches | Average |
|---|---|---|---|---|---|---|
| 1 | Mark Keane | Limerick | 3-34 | 43 | 5 | 8.60 |
| 2 | Conor Gath | Offaly | 1-16 | 19 | 4 | 4.75 |
| 3 | Damien Murray | Offaly | 0-16 | 16 | 4 | 4.00 |
| 4 | David Huban | Galway | 3-04 | 13 | 2 | 6.50 |
| 4 | Brian Begley | Limerick | 2-06 | 12 | 5 | 2.40 |
| 4 | Donncha Sheehan | Limerick | 2-06 | 12 | 5 | 2.40 |
| 4 | Alec Watt | Antrim | 2-06 | 12 | 3 | 4.00 |
| 8 | Rory Hogan | Clare | 2-05 | 11 | 2 | 5.50 |
| 8 | Andrew Mitchell | Westmeath | 0-11 | 11 | 2 | 5.50 |
| 8 | P Fitzgerald | Waterford | 0-11 | 11 | 2 | 5.50 |

Top scorers in a single game

| Rank | Player | County | Tally | Total | Opposition |
|---|---|---|---|---|---|
| 1 | Mark Keane | Limerick | 1-10 | 13 | Antrim |
| 2 | David Huban | Galway | 3-03 | 12 | Offaly |
| 2 | Mark Keane | Limerick | 1-09 | 12 | Cork |
| 4 | Rory Hogan | Clare | 2-05 | 11 | Kerry |
| 5 | Conor Gath | Offaly | 1-06 | 9 | Laois |
| 5 | Paul Braniff | Down | 1-06 | 9 | Derry |
| 7 | James Young | Laois | 1-05 | 8 | Offaly |
| 8 | Brian Cosgrave | Clare | 2-01 | 7 | Kerry |
| 8 | J McKenna | Derry | 2-01 | 7 | Down |
| 8 | Alec Watt | Antrim | 1-04 | 7 | Armagh |
| 8 | Cian Daly | Dublin | 1-04 | 7 | Westmeath |
| 8 | Andrew Mitchell | Westmeath | 0-07 | 7 | Dublin |
| 8 | Kevin Power | Kilkenny | 0-07 | 7 | Offaly |
