= Barry Lambert =

Irish hurler (born 1981)

Personal information
- Born: 1981 (age 44–45) Piercestown, County Wexford, Ireland

Sport
- Sport: Hurling
- Position: Right corner-forward
Club
- Years: Club
- St. Martin's
Club titles
- Wexford titles: 2
College
- Years: College
- Dublin Institute of Technology
College titles
- Fitzgibbon titles: 0
Inter-county
Years	County	Apps (scores)
2001-2009	Wexford	19 (3-23)
Inter-county titles
- Leinster titles: 1
- All-Irelands: 0
- NHL: 0
- All Stars: 0

Barry Lambert (born 1981) is an Irish former hurler. At club level he played with St. Martin's and was also a member of the Wexford senior hurling team. He usually lined out as a forward.

== Career ==
Lambert first played at juvenile and underage levels with the St. Martin's club. He later joined the club's top adult team and won County Championship titles in 1999 and 2008. He also lined out with St. Peter's College at colleges level and with Dublin Institute of Technology in the Fitzgibbon Cup. Lambert first appeared on the inter-county scene at minor level with Wexford before lining out in the 2001 All-Ireland under-21 final defeat by Limerick. His underage performances saw him drafted onto the Wexford senior hurling team in 2001. Over the course of the following decade Lambert was a regular on the team and won a Leinster Championship medal in 2004. A shoulder injury brought his inter-county career to an end in 2009.

== Career statistics ==
Team	Year	National League			Leinster		All-Ireland		Total	
Team	Year	Division	Apps	Score	Apps	Score	Apps	Score	Apps	Score
Wexford	2001	Division 1B	0	0-00	0	0-00	1	0-00	1	0-00
Wexford	2002	Division 1B	4	1-23	2	1-03	1	0-00	7	2-26
Wexford	2003	Division 1B	6	0-14	2	1-01	2	0-01	10	1-16
Wexford	2004	Division 1B	8	1-24	2	0-07	1	0-00	11	1-31
Wexford	2005	Division 1B	8	1-07	2	0-00	0	0-00	10	1-07
Wexford	2006	Division 1A	3	0-03	0	0-00	0	0-00	3	0-03
Wexford	2007	Division 1A	4	0-13	2	0-04	2	1-07	8	1-24
Wexford	2008	Division 1A	1	0-00	1	0-00	1	0-00	3	0-00
Wexford	2009	Division 2	0	0-00	0	0-00	0	0-00	0	0-00
Career total			34	3-84	11	2-15	8	1-08	53	6-107

== Honours ==
St. Martin's

- Wexford Senior Hurling Championship: 1999, 2008

Wexford

- Leinster Senior Hurling Championship: 2004
- Leinster Under-21 Hurling Championship: 2001
