= Mark Keane (hurler) =

Irish hurler

Personal information
- Native name: Marc Ó Céin (Irish)
- Born: 1981 (age 44–45) Limerick, Ireland
- Occupation: Electrician
- Height: 6 ft 1 in (185 cm)

Sport
- Sport: Hurling
- Position: Left corner-forward
Club
- Years: Club
- South Liberties
Club titles
- Limerick titles: 0
Inter-county*
Years	County	Apps (scores)
2000–2006	Limerick	10 (0-25)
Inter-county titles
- Munster titles: 0
- All-Irelands: 0
- NHL: 0
- All Stars: 0
- *Inter County team apps and scores correct as of 01:10, 5 January 2017.

Mark Keane (born 1981) is a hurler. His league and championship career with the Limerick senior team spanned seven seasons from 2000 until 2006.

Keane made his debut on the inter-county scene at the age of sixteen when he was selected for the Limerick minor team. He spent two championship seasons with the minor team, however, he enjoyed little success during that time. Keane subsequently joined the Limerick under-21 team, winning three successive All-Ireland medals from 2000 to 2002. By this stage he had also joined the Limerick senior team, making his debut in the 2000 league. Over the course of the next seven seasons Keane became a regular member of the starting fifteen, however, he enjoyed little success in terms of silverware. He played his last game for Limerick in July 2006.

Keane got nerve damage and injured his right hand in 2018 after rescuing a colleague from a Johnson & Johnson machine in Plassey. He got a €944,000 award, reduced on a Johnson & Johnson appeal by €58,000. He has struggled with his cycling since the injuries.

== Career statistics ==
Team	Year	National League			Munster		All-Ireland		Total	
Team	Year	Division	Apps	Score	Apps	Score	Apps	Score	Apps	Score
Limerick	2000	Division 1A	7	1-27	1	0-03	0	0-00	8	1-30
Limerick	2001	Division 1A	6	1-30	3	0-00	0	0-00	9	1-30
Limerick	2002	Division 1B	7	4-44	1	0-08	1	0-04	9	4-56
Limerick	2003	Division 1B	5	0-17	0	0-00	0	0-00	5	0-17
Limerick	2004	Division 1B	0	0-00	0	0-00	0	0-00	0	0-00
Limerick	2005	Division 1B	2	0-07	0	0-00	0	0-00	2	0-07
Limerick	2006	Division 1B	7	4-50	1	0-05	3	0-05	11	4-60
Total			34	10-175	6	0-16	4	0-09	44	10-200

== Honours ==
South Liberties

- Munster Intermediate Club Hurling Championship: 2009
- Limerick Intermediate Hurling Championship: 2009

Limerick

- Munster Intermediate Hurling Championship: 2008
- All-Ireland Under-21 Hurling Championship: 2000, 2001, 2002
- Munster Under-21 Hurling Championship: 2000, 2001, 2002
