= Dave Keane =

Irish hurler and manager

Personal information
- Native name: Daithí Ó Catháin (Irish)
- Born: 1956 (age 69–70) Passage West, County Cork, Ireland

Sport
- Sport: Hurling
Clubs
- Years: Club
- 1970s-1980s 1980s-1990s: Passage West; Adare
Club titles
- Cork titles: 0

Dave Keane (born 1956 in Passage West, County Cork, Ireland) is an Irish retired hurling manager and former player. He played hurling with his local clubs Passage West and Adare and was manager of the Limerick senior inter-county team from 2002 until 2003.

He managed Limerick to 3 All-Ireland Under 21 Hurling Championships from 2000-02.

Sporting positions
| Preceded by Mossie Carroll | Limerick Senior Hurling Manager; 2002-2004 | Succeeded by Séamus Murphy |
