= Connacht Under-21 Hurling Championship =

- Founded: 1964
- Title holders: Galway (8th title)
- Most titles: Galway (8 titles)

For the Senior equivalent see: Connacht Senior Hurling Championship

The Connacht U-21 Hurling Championship is an U-21 hurling tournament. The winners of the Connacht championship go on to qualify for the All-Ireland Under-21 Hurling Championship. The last winners of the Connacht championship was Galway in 2005, there was no competition in 2006 and 2007 therefore Galway went straight to the semi-finals of the All-Ireland Under-21 Hurling Championship without playing a game. Galway are the only team to win the Connacht championship and it has only been played on 8 occasions due to a lack of a competitive side to compete with in Connacht.

The competition was resurrected in 2010 as part of the All-Ireland B Under-21 Hurling Championship. The final was won by Roscommon who defeated Mayo 3–10 to 0–10.

== Top winners ==
	Team	Wins	Years won
1	Galway	8	1972, 1978, 1983, 1986, 1991, 1993, 1996, 2005
2	Roscommon	3	1964, 1965, 1966

== Sources ==
- Roll of Honour on gaainfo.com
- Complete Roll of Honour on Kilkenny GAA bible
