= John Tennyson =

Irish hurler

Personal information
- Native name: Seán Tennyson (Irish)
- Nicknames: Tenno, Tennyson
- Born: 6 February 1985 (age 41) County Kilkenny, Ireland
- Occupation: Engineer
- Height: 6 ft 1 in (185 cm)

Sport
- Sport: Hurling
- Position: Centre-back
Club
- Years: Club
- Carrickshock
Club titles
- Kilkenny titles: 0
Inter-county*
Years	County	Apps (scores)
2005–2013	Kilkenny	19 (0-00)
Inter-county titles
- Leinster titles: 4
- All-Irelands: 3
- NHL: 2
- All Stars: 0
- *Inter County team apps and scores correct as of 22:29, 27 May 2013.

John Tennyson (born 6 February 1985) is an Irish hurler who played as a centre-back for the Kilkenny senior team.

Born in County Kilkenny, Tennyson first played competitive hurling whilst at school in St. Kieran's College. He arrived on the inter-county scene at the age of seventeen when he first linked up with the Kilkenny minor team, before later lining out with the under-21 and intermediate sides. He made his senior debut during the 2005 championship. Tennyson went on to play for what has come to be known as the greatest team of all time, and has won three All-Ireland medals, four Leinster medals and two National Hurling League medals. He was an All-Ireland runner-up on one occasion.

As a member of the Leinster inter-provincial team on a number of occasions Tennyson won one Railway Cup medal .At club level he continues to play for Carrickshock.

His brother, Pat Tennyson, was also enjoyed an inter-county career with Kilkenny.

Throughout his career Tennyson made 19 championship appearances. He announced his retirement from inter-county hurling on 26 May 2013.

== Early life ==
John Tennyson was born in County Kilkenny in 1985. He was educated locally at Newmarket N.S. and later at St. Kieran's College, a school renowned for producing fine county hurlers. It was here that Tennyson first tasted success as he won an All-Ireland colleges medal with the school's senior team. Tennyson graduated from University College Cork with an honours degree in civil & environmental engineering. It was at UCC that he earned three consecutive Datapac Hotshot awards.

== Playing career ==
=== Colleges ===
During his schooling at St. Kieran's College in Kilkenny, Tennyson established himself as a key member of the senior hurling team. In 2002 he won his first Leinster medal following a 1–15 to 2–3 defeat of city rivals CBS Kilkenny.

Tennyson added a second Leinster medal to his collection in 2003, as St. Peter's College were defeated by 2–13 to 1–10. St. Colman's College provided the opposition in the subsequent All-Ireland decider. Having come close to beating the Fermoy-based school at the same stage the previous year, St. Kieran's made no mistake this time and recorded a 1–15 to 1–4 victory, giving Tennyson an All-Ireland medal.

=== Club ===
Tennyson plays his club hurling with Carrickshock and has enjoyed much success.

In 2004 Carrickshock reached a third consecutive intermediate championship final, having lost the previous two deciders. A narrow 0–14 to 1–10 defeat of Mooncoin gave Tennyson a championship medal. He later won a Leinster medal as Carrickshock defeated St. Patrick's by 2–16 to 0–7 in the inaugural provincial decider. Tennyson's side were subsequently defeated by Kildangan in the All-Ireland decider.

On 25 October 2010 Tennyson played in his first senior championship decider. Carrickshock were fancied to end a 59-year wait for the title but found themselves chasing the game from the start and eventually lost by 0–17 to 1–11.

=== Minor and under-21 ===
Tennyson first played for Kilkenny in 2002 when he joined the minor side. He won his first Leinster medal that year following a 2–15 to 2–8 defeat of Wexford. Kilkenny subsequently faced Tipperary in the All-Ireland decider. A tour de force by "the Cats" gave them a huge 3–15 to 1–7 victory and gave Tennyson his first All-Ireland medal.

In 2003 Tennyson won his second successive Leinster medal following an 0–18 to 0–13 defeat of Offaly. Kilkenny subsequently faced Galway in the All-Ireland decider. Richie Power gave a masterclass of hurling, including scoring the winning point deep into injury time, to secure a 2–16 to 2–15 victory. It was Tennyson's second All-Ireland medal.

The following year Tennyson was added to the Kilkenny intermediate team. He won his sole Leinster medal that year following a 3–17 to 1–10 thrashing of old rivals Wexford. The subsequent All-Ireland decider saw old rivals Cork providining the opposition. The Rebels looked to be heading for victory, however, an injury time goal from Brian Phelan secured a 2–11 apiece victory. The replay was more conclusive with Kilkenny facing a 1–16 to 1–10 defeat.

Tennyson was also added to the Kilkenny under-21 team that year. He subsequently collected his Leinster medal as Wexford were downed by 0–16 to 2–3. The subsequent All-Ireland final between Kilkenny and old rivals Tipperary was a total mismatch. "The Cats" scored key goals early in the opening half, which helped power them to a 3–21 to 1–6 victory. It was Tennyson's first All-Ireland medal.

In 2005 Tennyson added a second Leinster medal to his collection, following a 0–17 to 1–10 defeat of Dublin. Kilkenny's bid for a third successive All-Ireland title ended in dramatic fashion as a late point from Kerril Wade handed Galway a narrow 1–15 to 1–14 victory.

For the third successive year Tennyson won a Leinster medal following a 2–18 to 2–10 defeat of Dublin before later lining out in the All-Ireland decider against Tipperary. A last second opportunist goal by Richie Hogan saved Kilkenny and secured a 2–14 apiece draw. The replay was another close encounter, however, Paddy Hogan's first half goal helped Kilkenny claw their way to the title following a 1–11 to 0–11 defeat of Tipperary. It was Tennyson's second All-Ireland medal.

=== Senior ===
==== Early successes ====
Tennyson was still a member of the under-21 team when he was added to the Kilkenny senior panel in 2005. On 12 June 2005 he made his championship debut in a 6–28 to 0–15 Leinster semi-final trouncing of Offaly.

In 2006 Tennyson won his first National Hurling League medal following a 3–11 to 0–14 victory over Limerick. He later won his first Leinster medal following a facile 1–23 to 1–12 victory over Wexford. On 3 September 2006 Kilkenny faced a Cork team who were presented with the opportunity to become the first side in nearly thirty years to secure three successive All-Ireland championships. Like previous encounters neither side took a considerable lead, however, Kilkenny had a vital goal from Aidan Fogarty. Cork were in arrears coming into the final few minutes, however, Ben O'Connor scored a late goal for Cork. It was too little too late as the Cats denied Cork on a score line of 1–16 to 1–13. It was a first All-Ireland medal for Tennyson.

Tennyson collected a second Leinster medal in 2007, as Kilkenny asserted their provincial dominance and defeated Wexford by 2–24 to 1–12. On 2 September 2007 Kilkenny faced defeated Munster finalists and surprise All-Ireland semi-final winners Limerick in the championship decider. Kilkenny got off to a flying start with Eddie Brennan and Henry Shefflin scoring two goals within the first ten minutes to set the tone. Limerick launched a second-half comeback, however, "the Cats" were too powerful and cruised to a 2–19 to 1–15 victory. It was Tennyson's second successive All-Ireland medal.

An injury hampered Tennyson's 2008 championship campaign, however, he collected another set of Leinster and All-Ireland medals as a non-playing substitute.

Tennyson was back on the starting fifteen in 2009, and collected a second league medal as Kilkenny beat Tipperary by 2–26 to 4–17 with a thrilling extra-time victory. He later won a third Leinster medal as new challengers Dublin were bested by 2–18 to 0–18. On 6 September Kilkenny were poised to become the second team ever in the history of hurling to win four successive All-Ireland championships when they faced Tipperary in the decider. For long periods Tipp looked the likely winners, however, late goals from Henry Shefflin and substitute Martin Comerford finally killed off their efforts to secure a 2–22 to 0–23 victory. Tennyson had collected his third All-Ireland medal.

==== Decline ====
In 2010 Kilkenny defeated Galway in an eagerly-anticipated but ultimately disappointing provincial decider. A 1–19 to 1–12 victory gave Tennyson, who started the game on the bench before coming on as a substitute, a fourth Leinster medal. The drive for an unprecedented fifth successive All-Ireland crown reached a head on 5 September 2010, when Kilkenny faced Tipperary in the All-Ireland decider. "The Cats" lost talisman Henry Shefflin due to injury, while Tipperary's Lar Corbett ran riot and scored a hat-trick of goals as Larkin's side fell to a 4–17 to 1–18 defeat. Following the All-Ireland decider Tennyson underwent surgery on a cruciate ligament injury. An infection in his knee later ruled him out of the 2011 championship.

Tennyson returned to championship action in Kilkenny's 2–21 to 0–9 Leinster semi-final defeat of Dublin. He was confined to the substitute's bench for the rest of the championship, but collected another All-Ireland medal as a non-playing member of the panel who defeated Galway in an All-Ireland final replay.

After failing to make any appearances during Kilkenny's successful league campaign in 2013, Tennyson decided to retire from inter-county hurling before the start of the championship.

== Personal life ==
His family have a keen interest in horse racing, owning numerous reasonably successful horses. Presently he owns one horse that has run twice in point to point as of March 2008, named Jimandgary foaled in 2003 and trained by Patrick Cody, finishing third on both occasions. On 20 April 2008, the horse won is first race at Ballydurn in Waterford.

== Honours ==
=== Team ===
St. Kieran's College

- All-Ireland Senior Colleges Hurling Championship (1): 2003
- Leinster Colleges Senior Hurling Championship (2): 2002, 2003

Kilkenny

- All-Ireland Senior Hurling Championship (6): 2006, 2007, 2008 (sub), 2009, 2011 (sub), 2012 (sub)
- Leinster Senior Hurling Championship (6): 2005 (sub), 2006, 2007, 2008 (sub), 2009, 2010
- National Hurling League (3): 2005 (sub), 2006, 2009, 2012 (sub)
- All-Ireland Under-21 Hurling Championship (2): 2004 (c), 2006
- Leinster Under-21 Hurling Championship (3): 2004 (c), 2005, 2006
- All-Ireland Minor Hurling Championship (2): 2002, 2003
- Leinster Minor Hurling Championship (2): 2002, 2003

Leinster

- Railway Cup (1): 2006
