= Michael Rice (hurler) =

Irish hurling selector and hurler (born 1984)

Micheal Rice
Personal information
- Native name: Mícheál Rís (Irish)
- Born: 27 January 1984 (age 42) Hugginstown, County Kilkenny, Ireland
- Occupation: Secondary school vice principal
- Height: 5 ft 11 in (180 cm)

Sport
- Sport: Hurling
- Position: Midfield
Club
- Years: Club
- Carrickshock
Club titles
- Kilkenny titles: 0
College
- Years: College
- 2002-2008: University College Cork
College titles
- Fitzgibbon titles: 0
Inter-county*
Years	County	Apps (scores)
2005–2016	Kilkenny	28 (1–24)
Inter-county titles
- Leinster titles: 9
- All-Irelands: 8
- NHL: 6
- All Stars: 2
- *Inter County team apps and scores correct as of 18:21, 17 October 2019.

Michael Rice (born 27 January 1984) is an Irish hurling selector and hurler who plays for Kilkenny Intermediate Championship club Carrickshock. He was a member of the Kilkenny senior hurling team for 12 years, during which time he usually lined out at midfield. Rice is currently a selector with the Kilkenny under-20 hurling team.

== Playing career ==
=== Carrickshock ===
After much success at underage levels, including several minor and under-21 championships, Rice quickly joined the Carrickshock senior team.

In 2004 Rice won a county intermediate championship medal with Carrickshock following a narrow 0–14 to 1–10 defeat of Mooncoin. He later won a Leinster intermediate winners' medal as Carrickshock defeated St Patrick's of Wexford by 2–16 to 0–7 in the inaugural provincial decider. Power's side were subsequently defeated by Kildangan in the All-Ireland Intermediate Club Hurling Championship decider.

=== Kilkenny ===
==== Minor and under-21 ====
Rice first played for Kilkenny as a 17-year-old member of the minor team during the 2001 Leinster Championship. He made his first appearance for the team on 27 June 2001 in a 1–14 to 1–06 defeat of Dublin. On 8 July 2001, Rice won a Leinster Championship medal after lining out at right wing-back in Kilkenny's 3–16 to 1–09 defeat of Wexford in the final.

Rice was appointed captain of the team for the 2002 Leinster Championship. He won a second successive Leinster Championship medal on 7 July 2002 following Kilkenny's 2–15 to 2–08 defeat of Wexford in the final. On 8 September 2002, Rice captained Kilkenny to an All-Ireland final meeting with Tipperary. Lining out at midfield, he ended the game with a winners' medal following the 3–15 to 1–07 victory.

On 11 June 2003, Rice made his first appearance for the Kilkenny under-21 team when he lined out at midfield in a 2–18 to 0-10 Leinster Championship defeat of Offaly. He won a Leinster Championship medal on 16 July 2003 after again lining out at midfield in a 0–12 to 1–04 defeat of Dublin in the final. On 21 September 2003, Rice won an All-Ireland medal after Kilkenny's 2–13 to 0–12 defeat of Galway in the final.

Rice was dropped from the starting fifteen for the 2004 Leinster Championship. In spite of this he won a second successive Leinster Championship medal, albeit as a non-playing substitute, on 14 July 2004 following Kilkenny's 1–16 to 2–03 defeat of Wexford in the final. On 18 September 2004, Rice was again named amongst the substitutes when Kilkenny faced Tipperary in the All-Ireland final. He was introduced as a substitute for James Fitzpatrick and collected a second successive winners' medal after scoring a point in the 3–21 to 1–06 victory.

On 20 July 2005, Rice won a third successive Leinster Championship medal after being reinstated to the starting fifteen for Kilkenny's 0–17 to 1–10 defeat of Dublin in the final. He was again named at midfield when Kilkenny faced Galway in the All-Ireland final on 18 September 2005. In his last game in the under-21 grade, Rice ended on the losing side following a 1–15 to 1–14 defeat.

==== Senior ====
Rice was drafted onto the Kilkenny senior panel in advance of the 2005 National League. He was an unused substitute throughout the campaign but collected a winners' medal on 2 May 2005 following Kilkenny's 3–20 to 0–15 defeat of Clare in the final. Rice retained his position as a member of the panel for the 2005 Leinster Championship. He won a Leinster Championship medal as a non-playing substitute on 7 July 2005 after a 0–22 to 1–16 defeat of Wexford in the final.

On 13 February 2006, Rice made his competitive debut for Kilkenny when he came on as a 53rd-minute substitute for Michael Fennelly and scored three points in a 1–26 to 1-13 National League defeat of Laois. He made his Leinster Championship debut on 10 June 2006 when he came on as a 48th-minute substitute for Martin Comerford in a 1–23 to 1–09 defeat of Westmeath. On 2 July 2006, Rice started the Leinster final at left wing-forward and ended the game with a second successive winners' medal after a 1–23 to 2–12 defeat of Wexford. The All-Ireland final on 3 September 2006 saw Rice drop to the substitutes' bench once again, however, he ended the game with a winners' medal after a 1–16 to 1–13 defeat of Cork.

On 29 April 2007, Rice was an unused substitute when Kilkenny suffered a 0–20 to 0–18 defeat by Waterford in the National League final. On 1 July 2007, he won a third successive Leinster Championship medal after coming on as a substitute for Eoin Reid in Kilkenny's 2–24 to 1–12 defeat of Wexford in the final. Rice started the All-Ireland final on 2 September 2007 on the bench. He was an unused substitute throughout the game but collected a second successive All-Ireland medal after the 2–19 to 1–15 defeat of Limerick.

Rice enjoyed an impact-sub role once again during the 2008 season. He won a fourth successive Leinster Championship medal on 6 July 2008 after coming on as a substitute for Richie Mullally in Kilkenny's 5–21 to 0–17 defeat of Wexford in the final. On 8 September 2008, Rice was again on the bench when Kilkenny faced Waterford in a first All-Ireland final since 1963. He remained on the bench throughout but claimed third successive winners' medal following the 3–30 to 1–13 victory.

Rice won his third National League medal - his first on the field of play - on 3 May 2009 when he lined out at midfield in Kilkenny's 2–26 to 4-17 extra-time defeat of Tipperary in the final. On 5 July 2009, he won a fifth successive Leinster Championship medal after scoring a point from midfield in the 2–18 to 0–18 defeat of Dublin. On 6 September 2009, Rice was selected at midfield when Kilkenny faced Tipperary in the All-Ireland final. He ended the game with a fourth successive All-Ireland medal - his first on the field of play - following the 2–22 to 0–23 victory. Rice ended the season by being named at midfield on the All-Star team.

On 4 July 2010, Rice won a sixth successive Leinster Championship medal after scoring two points from midfield in Kilkenny's 1–19 to 1–12 defeat of Galway in the final. On 5 September 2010, he was listed amongst the substitutes when Kilkenny faced Tipperary in a second successive All-Ireland final and the chance to win a record-breaking fifth successive title. Rice was introduced as an early substitute for the injured Henry Shefflin but ended on the losing side following a 4–17 to 1–18 defeat.

On 1 May 2011, Rice scored a point from midfield when Kilkenny suffered a 0–22 to 1–07 defeat by Dublin in the National League final. On 3 July 2011, he won a seventh consecutive Leinster Championship medal after scoring his only career goal in Kilkenny's 4–17 to 1–15 defeat of Dublin in the final. Rice was again at midfield when Kilkenny faced Tipperary in a third successive All-Ireland final on 4 September 2011. He scored a point from play and claimed a fifth winners' medal after the 2–17 to 1–16 victory. Rice ended the season by winning a second All-Star award at midfield.

On 6 May 2012, Rice was an unused substitute when he won a fourth National League medal following Kilkenny's 3–21 to 0–16 defeat of Cork in the final. He was again named amongst the substitutes when Kilkenny faced Galway in the Leinster final on 8 July 2012. Rice scored a point after being introduced as a substitute but ended on the losing side following a 2–21 to 2–11 defeat. On 19 August 2012, his season came to an end after suffering a serious hand injury in Kilkenny's 4–24 to 1–15 defeat of Tipperary in the All-Ireland semi-final. In spite of this, Rice was presented with a sixth All-Ireland medal following Kilkenny's 3–22 to 3–11 defeat of Galway in the All-Ireland final replay on 30 September 2012.

Rice overcame his hand injury and made a number of appearances in Kilkenny's 2013 National League campaign. He won a fifth National League medal on 5 May 2013 after scoring a point from midfield in Kilkenny's 2–17 to 0–20 defeat of Tipperary in the final.

Rice was a member of the extended panel during Kilkenny's 2014 National League campaign, however, he claimed a sixth winners' medal following Kilkenny's 2–25 to 1–27 defeat of Tipperary in the final on 4 May 2014. He later suffered a cruciate ligament injury which ruled him out of the rest of the season. Rice remained close to the extended panel during his injury and was entitled to collect an eighth Leinster Championship medal and a seventh All-Ireland medal at the end of the season following respective victories over Dublin and Tipperary.

Rice was a peripheral member of the Kilkenny team once again for the 2015 season. He won a ninth Leinster Championship medal on 5 July 2015 as a member of the extended panel following Kilkenny's 1–25 to 2–15 defeat of Galway in the final. On 6 September 2015, Rice failed to make the match-day panel when Kilkenny faced Galway in the All-Ireland final. In spite of this he collected an eighth All-Ireland medal as a member of the extended panel.

Having just turned 32, Rice once again committed to the Kilkenny team for the 2016 National League. He was released from the panel following Kilkenny's semi-final defeat by Clare, a move which effectively brought an end to his inter-county career.

=== Leinster ===
In 2008 Rice was picked for duty with Leinster for the first time, as the inter-provincial team faced Munster in the decider. Richie Power top-scored with nine points as Leinster secured a 1–15 to 1–12 victory. It was Rice's first Railway Cup medal.

Leinster made it two-in-a-row in 2009, with Rice collecting his second winner's medal as Leinster defeated Connacht by 3–18 to 1–17.

After a two-year hiatus and a period of uncertainty surrounding the competition, the Railway Cup returned in 2012 with Leinster facing Connacht in the decider once again. The game was effectively over at half time, with Leinster powering to an eventual 2–19 to 1–15 victory.

=== Ireland ===
On 19 October 2011, Rice was appointed captain of the Ireland squad for the Shinty/Hurling International Series. On 29 October 2011, he scored two points from centre-forward when Ireland defeated Scotland on an aggregate scoreline of 3–25 to 3-19 following a two-game series.

== Coaching career ==
=== Kilkenny ===
On 14 October 2019, Rice was ratified as a selector with the Kilkenny under-20 hurling team.

== Career statistics ==
Team	Year	National League			Leinster		All-Ireland		Total	
Team	Year	Division	Apps	Score	Apps	Score	Apps	Score	Apps	Score
Kilkenny	2005	Division 1	0	0-00	0	0-00	0	0-00	0	0-00
Kilkenny	2006	Division 1	5	0-08	2	0-04	2	0-00	9	0-12
Kilkenny	2007	Division 1	5	0-04	2	0-01	0	0-00	7	0-05
Kilkenny	2008	Division 1	3	0-09	2	0-02	1	0-00	6	0-11
Kilkenny	2009	Division 1	7	0-10	2	0-01	2	0-01	11	0-12
Kilkenny	2010	Division 1	4	0-06	2	0-04	2	0-01	8	0-11
Kilkenny	2011	Division 1	4	0-05	2	1-06	2	0-02	8	1-13
Kilkenny	2012	Division 1A	4	0-06	1	0-01	2	0-01	7	0-08
Kilkenny	2013	Division 1A	3	0-03	3	0-00	1	0-00	7	0-03
Kilkenny	2014	Division 1A	0	0-00	0	0-00	0	0-00	0	0-00
Kilkenny	2015	Division 1A	0	0-00	0	0-00	0	0-00	0	0-00
Kilkenny	2016	Division 1A	0	0-00	—		—		0	0-00
Total			35	0-51	16	1-19	12	0-05	63	1-75

== Honours ==
=== Team ===
St. Kieran's College

- All-Ireland Colleges Senior Hurling Championship (1): 2000 (sub)
- Leinster Colleges Senior Hurling Championship (2): 2000 (sub), 2002

Carrickshock

- All-Ireland Intermediate Club Hurling Championship (1): 2017
- Leinster Intermediate Club Hurling Championship (2): 2004, 2016
- Kilkenny Intermediate Hurling Championship (2): 2004, 2016
- Kilkenny Under-21 B Hurling Championship (1): 2000
- Kilkenny Minor Hurling Championship (2): 2001, 2002

Kilkenny

- All-Ireland Senior Hurling Championship (8): 2006, 2007, 2008, 2009, 2011, 2012, 2014, 2015
- Leinster Senior Hurling Championship (9): 2005, 2006, 2007, 2008, 2009, 2010, 2011, 2014, 2015
- National Hurling League (6): 2005, 2006, 2009, 2012, 2013, 2014
- All-Ireland Under-21 Hurling Championship (1): 2004
- Leinster Under-21 Hurling Championship (1): 2004, 2005
- All-Ireland Minor Hurling Championship (1): 2002
- Leinster Minor Hurling Championship (2): 2001, 2002

Leinster

- Railway Cup (3): 2008, 2009, 2012

Sporting positions
Preceded by	Kilkenny minor hurling team captain 2002	Succeeded by Richie Power
Preceded by Tommy Walsh	Ireland national hurling team captain 2011	Succeeded by Eoin Price
Achievements
Preceded by Tomás O'Leary	All-Ireland Minor Hurling Final winning captain 2002	Succeeded by Richie Power
Preceded by Tommy Walsh	Shinty-Hurling International Series winning captain 2011	Succeeded by Eoin Price
