= James Fitzpatrick (hurler) =

Irish hurler (born 1985)

Personal information
- Native name: Séamus Mac Giolla Phádraig (Irish)
- Nickname: Cha
- Born: Knockmoylan, County Kilkenny, Ireland
- Occupation: Primary school
- Height: 5 ft 10 in (178 cm)

Sport
- Sport: Hurling
- Position: Midfield
Club
- Years: Club
- 2003-2016: Ballyhale Shamrocks
Club titles
- Kilkenny titles: 6
- Leinster titles: 4
- All-Ireland Titles: 3
Inter-county*
Years	County	Apps (scores)
2004-2011	Kilkenny	23 (1-33)
Inter-county titles
- Leinster titles: 7
- All-Irelands: 5
- NHL: 3
- All Stars: 3
- *Inter County team apps and scores correct as of 12:58,.

James "Cha" Fitzpatrick (born 31 January 1985) is an Irish hurler who played as a midfielder for the Kilkenny senior team.

Born in Knockmoylan, County Kilkenny, Fitzpatrick first played competitive hurling during his schooling at St. Kieran's College. He arrived on the inter-county scene at the age of seventeen when he first linked up with the Kilkenny minor team, before later joining the under-21 side. He made his senior debut during the 2004 championship. Fitzpatrick later became a regular member of the starting fifteen, and won five All-Ireland medals, five Leinster medals and two National League medals on the field of play. The All-Ireland-winning captain in 2008, he was an All-Ireland runner-up on two occasions.

At club level, Fitzpatrick is a three-time All-Ireland medallist with Ballyhale Shamrocks. In addition to this he has also won four Leinster medals and five championship medals.

Throughout his career Fitzpatrick made 23 championship appearances. He announced his retirement from inter-county hurling on 21 November 2011.

== Playing career ==
=== Colleges ===
During his schooling at St. Kieran's College in Kilkenny, Fitzpatrick established himself as a key member of the senior hurling team. In 2002 he won his first Leinster medal following a 1–15 to 2–3 defeat of city rivals CBS Kilkenny.

Fitzpatrick added a second Leinster medal to his collection in 2003, as St. Peter's College were defeated by 2–13 to 1–10. St. Colman's College provided the opposition in the subsequent All-Ireland decider. Having come close to beating the Fermoy-based school at the same stage the previous year, St. Kieran's made no mistake this time and recorded a 1–15 to 1–4 victory, giving Fitzpatrick an All-Ireland medal.

=== Club ===
After much success at underage levels, including four successive under-21 championships, Fitzpatrick quickly joined the Ballyhale Shamrocks senior team. In 2006 he was at midfield as Ballyhale faced O'Loughlin Gaels in the senior decider. An impressive 1–22 to 2–11 victory gave Fitzpatrick his first championship medal. He later added a Leinster medal to his collection when Ballyhale secured a comprehensive 1–20 to 1–8 defeat of Birr to take the provincial title for the first time in seventeen years. On 17 March 2007 Ballyhale Shamrocks faced Loughrea in the All-Ireland decider. On a day when both Henry Shefflin and Fitzpatrick were held scoreless, the three Reid brothers contributed 3-7 from play. A 3–12 to 2–8 victory gave Fitzpatrick an All-Ireland Senior Club Hurling Championship medal.

After missing Ballyhale's second successive championship victory in 2007, Fitzpatrick was restored to his midfield berth as the Shamrocks made it three-in-a-row in 2008. A 2–11 to 0–12 defeat of James Stephens gave Fitzpatrick a second championship medal. He later won a second Leinster medal as the Shamrocks defeated reigning champions Birr by 2–13 to 1–11.

Fitzpatrick won a third championship medal in 2009, as Ballyhale claimed a record-equaling four-in-a-row following a 1–14 to 1–11 defeat of James Stephens once again. The subsequent provincial decider saw Ballyhale hit fifteen wides, however, Fitzpatrick still collected a third Leinster medal following a 1–16 to 1–8 defeat of Tullamore. On 17 March 2010 Ballyhale faced three-in-a-row Portumna in a "dream" All-Ireland decider. The game failed to live up to the billing, however, a 1–19 to 0–17 victory gave Fitzpatrick a second All-Ireland medal.

Five-in-a-row proved beyond Ballyhale Shamrocks, however, the team bounced back in 2012 having lost the championship decider the previous year. A far from vintage 0–16 to 0–12 defeat of Dicksboro gave Fitzpatrick a fourth championship medal.

Fitzpatrick won a fifth championship medal in 2014 as the Shamrocks claimed a 1–20 to 1–13 defeat of reigning champions Clara. He later collected a fourth Leinster medal as veteran Henry Shefflin proved the difference in a 0–21 to 1–14 defeat of Kilcormac/Killoughey. On 17 March 2015 Ballyhale faced Kilmallock in the All-Ireland decider. A complete mismatch saw Shamrocks win the game by 1–18 to 1–6, with Fitzpatrick collecting a third All-Ireland medal.

In 2016, "Cha" retired from club hurling, at the age of just 31.

=== Minor & under-21 ===
Fitzpatrick first played for Kilkenny in 2002 when he joined the minor side. He won his first Leinster medal that year following a 2–15 to 2–8 defeat of Wexford. Kilkenny subsequently faced Tipperary in the All-Ireland decider. A tour de force by "the Cats" gave them a huge 3–15 to 1–7 victory and gave Fitzpatrick his first All-Ireland medal.

In 2003 Fitzpatrick won his second successive Leinster medal following an 0–18 to 0–13 defeat of Offaly. Kilkenny subsequently faced Galway in the All-Ireland decider. Richie Power gave a masterclass of hurling, including scoring the winning point deep into injury time, to secure a 2–16 to 2–15 victory. It was Fitzpatrick's second All-Ireland medal.

The following year Fitzpatrick collected a Leinster medal as captain of the under-21 team, as Wexford were downed by 0–16 to 2–3. The subsequent All-Ireland final between Kilkenny and old rivals Tipperary was a total mismatch. "The Cats" scored key goals early in the opening half, which helped power them to a 3–21 to 1–6 victory. It was Fitzpatrick's first All-Ireland medal.

Fitzpatrick added a second Leinster medal to his collection in 2005, following a 0–17 to 1–10 defeat of Dublin. Kilkenny's bid for a third successive All-Ireland title ended in dramatic fashion as a late point from Kerril Wade handed Galway a narrow 1–15 to 1–14 victory.

For the third successive year Fitzpatrick won a Leinster medal following a 2–18 to 2–10 defeat of Dublin before later lining out in the All-Ireland decider against Tipperary. A last second opportunist goal by Richie Hogan saved Kilkenny and secured a 2-14 apiece draw. The replay was another close encounter, however, Paddy Hogan's first half goal helped Kilkenny claw their way to the title following a 1–11 to 0–11 defeat of Tipperary. It was Fitzpatrick's second All-Ireland medal.

=== Senior ===
==== Beginnings ====
Fitzpatrick was just out of the minor grade when he joined the Kilkenny senior team. He made his senior championship debut when he came on as a substitute on 26 June 2004 in a 4–22 to 0-8 All-Ireland qualifier trouncing of Dublin. He later found a regular place on the starting fifteen and lined out against Cork in the All-Ireland decider on 12 September 2004. The game was expected to be a classic, however, a rain-soaked day made conditions difficult as Kilkenny aimed to secure a third successive championship. The first half was a low-scoring affair and provided little excitement for fans, however, the second half saw Cork completely take over. For the last twenty-three minutes Cork scored nine unanswered points and went on to win the game by 0–17 to 0–9.

==== Early successes ====
After a disappointing 2005 campaign, which saw Fitzpatrick confined to the bench, he returned to the starting fifteen in 2006. He won his first league medal that year following a 3–11 to 0–14 victory over Limerick. Fitzpatrick later won his first Leinster medal following a facile 1–23 to 1–12 victory over Wexford. On 3 September 2006 Kilkenny faced a Cork team who were presented with the opportunity to become the first side in nearly thirty years to secure three successive All-Ireland championships. Like previous encounters neither side took a considerable lead, however, Kilkenny had a vital goal from Aidan Fogarty. Cork were in arrears coming into the final few minutes, however, Ben O'Connor scored a late goal for Cork. It was too little too late as the Cats denied Cork on a score line of 1–16 to 1–13. It was Fitzpatrick's first All-Ireland medal. He rounded off the year by claiming his first All-Star while also taking the Vodafone Young Hurler of the Year title.

Fitzpatrick collected a second Leinster medal in 2007, as Kilkenny asserted their provincial dominance and defeated Wexford by 2–24 to 1–12. On 2 September 2007 Kilkenny faced defeated Munster finalists and surprise All-Ireland semi-final winners Limerick in the championship decider. Kilkenny got off to a flying start with Eddie Brennan and Henry Shefflin scoring two goals within the first ten minutes to set the tone. Limerick launched a second-half comeback, however, "the Cats" were too powerful and cruised to a 2–19 to 1–15 victory. It was Fitzpatrick's second All-Ireland medal. He was later presented with a second successive All-Star award.

On 22 January 2008 Fitzpatrick was nominated for the captaincy of the Kilkenny senior team. Kilkenny later secured the Leinster crown again in 2008, with Fitzpatrick collecting a third winners' medal following a 5–21 to 0–17 defeat of Wexford. On 8 September 2008 Kilkenny faced Waterford in the All-Ireland decider for the first time in forty-five years. In a disappointingly one-sided final, Kilkenny produced a near perfect seventy minutes as Waterford endured a nightmare afternoon. A 23-point winning margin, 3-24 from play, only two wides in the entire match and eight scorers in all with Eddie Brennan and Henry Shefflin leading the way in a 3–30 to 1–13 victory. It was Fitzpatrick's third successive All-Ireland medal while ha also had the honour of lifting the Liam MacCarthy Cup. A third consecutive All-Star quickly followed.

Fitzpatrick collected a second league medal in 2009, as Kilkenny beat Tipperary by 2–26 to 4–17 with a thrilling extra-time victory. He later won a fourth successive Leinster medal, as new challengers Dublin were bested by 2–18 to 0–18. Fitzpatrick was later dropped from the starting fifteen and was an unused substitute as Kilkenny secured a record-equaling fourth successive All-Ireland.

==== Decline ====
In 2010 Fitzpatrick also endured a frustrating championship campaign. After playing no part in the provincial series, he was named at midfield for the All-Ireland final against Tipperary on 5 September 2010. "The Cats" lost talisman Henry Shefflin due to injury, while Tipperary's Lar Corbett ran riot and scored a hat-trick of goals as Fitzpatrick's side fell to a 4–17 to 1–18 defeat.

Kilkenny's stranglehold in Leinster continued in 2011. A 4–17 to 1–15 defeat of Dublin gave "the Cats" a record-equalling seventh successive championship. It was Fitzpatrick's fifth winners' medal overall, however, he played no part in Kilkenny's subsequent 2–17 to 1-16 All-Ireland final defeat of Tipperary.

Fitzpatrick announced his retirement from inter-county hurling on 21 November 2011 at the age of just 26. He cited his frustration at a lack of game time as one of the main reasons behind his decision. At the time he denied a possible move to the Dublin senior team.

== Personal life ==
Born in Knockmoylan, County Kilkenny, Fitzpatrick was educated at the local national school before later completing his Leaving Certificate at St. Kieran's College. He subsequently started a degree in chemical engineering at University College Cork, before changing courses and qualifying as a primary school teacher from St. Patrick's College in Dublin. Since August 2019 he has been living and teaching primary-school-age children in the Chinese city of Xi’an. In China he met his wife, Eso, with whom he has a daughter.

== Quotes ==
- "It's been almost a century since we last achieved this feat [three All-Ireland titles in-a-row]. In 1934 it couldn't be done. In 1976 it couldn't be done. In 1984 it couldn't be done. In 1994 it couldn't be done in. In 2004 it couldn't be done. In 2008 it has been done and by God it's been done well." - Fitzpatrick's speech after accepting the Liam MacCarthy Cup in 2008.

== Honours ==
=== Team ===
St. Kieran's College

- All-Ireland Senior Colleges Hurling Championship (1): 2003 (c)
- Leinster Colleges Senior Hurling Championship (2): 2002, 2003 (c)

Ballyhale Shamrocks

- All-Ireland Senior Club Hurling Championship (3): 2007, 2010, 2015
- Leinster Senior Club Hurling Championship (4): 2006, 2008, 2009, 2014
- Kilkenny Senior Hurling Championship (6): 2006, 2007 (sub), 2008, 2009, 2012, 2014
- Kilkenny Under-21 Hurling Championship (4): 2003, 2004, 2005, 2006

Kilkenny

- All-Ireland Senior Hurling Championship (5): 2006, 2007, 2008 (c), 2009, 2011
- Leinster Senior Hurling Championship (7): 2005 (sub), 2006, 2007, 2008, 2009, 2010 (sub), 2011
- National Hurling League (3): 2005 (sub), 2006, 2009
- All-Ireland Under-21 Hurling Championship (2): 2004 (c), 2006
- Leinster Under-21 Hurling Championship (3): 2004 (c), 2005, 2006
- All-Ireland Minor Hurling Championship (2): 2002, 2003
- Leinster Minor Hurling Championship (2): 2002, 2003

=== Individual ===
Honours

- Vodafone Young Hurler of the Year (1): 2006
- GAA All Stars Awards (3): 2006, 2007, 2008

Achievements
Preceded by Jackie Tyrrell (Kilkenny)	All-Ireland Under-21 Hurling Final winning captain 2004	Succeeded by Kenneth Burke (Galway)
Preceded by Henry Shefflin (Kilkenny)	All-Ireland Senior Hurling Final winning captain 2008	Succeeded by Michael Fennelly (Kilkenny)
Awards
Preceded by David Collins (Galway)	Vodafone Young Hurler of the Year; 2006	Succeeded by Séamus Hickey (Limerick)
Sporting positions
Preceded by Henry Shefflin	Kilkenny Senior Hurling Captain; 2008	Succeeded by Michael Fennelly
