= 2006 All-Ireland Senior Hurling Championship final =

2006 All-Ireland Hurling Final
- Event: 2006 All-Ireland Senior Hurling Championship
Kilkenny	Cork
1–16	1–13
- Date: 3 September 2006
- Venue: Croke Park, Dublin
- Man of the Match: Aidan Fogarty
- Referee: Barry Kelly (Westmeath)
- Attendance: 82,275
- Weather: Sunny; 20 °C (68 °F)

The 2006 All-Ireland Senior Hurling Championship Final was a hurling match held at Croke Park, Dublin on 3 September 2006. The match was the 119th All-Ireland hurling final and was contested by Kilkenny and Cork, with Kilkenny putting in a fiercely determined and intense performance to win 1–16 to 1–13. It was the first meeting of these two sides in the All-Ireland final since 2004 when Cork were the winners. Cork were aiming to capture a third All-Ireland title in succession while Kilkenny, under the leadership of Brian Cody, were hoping to capture a first title since 2003. The prize for the winning team was the Liam MacCarthy Cup. While in recent years the All-Ireland final has been held on the second Sunday in September, the 2006 final was held a week earlier than normal in order to avoid a clash with golf's Ryder Cup.

== Previous championship encounters ==
This particular fixture has been frequent in the history of the All-Ireland Senior Hurling Championship. Kilkenny had played Cork a total of twenty-three times in the All-Ireland Senior Hurling Championship. As of 2006 Kilkenny had recorded twelve wins over the great rivals while Cork had defeated Kilkenny on nine occasions. There were two draws between the sides.

Year	Venue	Competition	Kilkenny score	Cork score	Match report
1893	Croke Park, Dublin	All-Ireland Hurling Final	0–2 (2)	6–8 (26)	
1903	Croke Park, Dublin	All-Ireland Hurling 'Home' Final	0–8 (8)	8–9 (33)	
1904	Croke Park, Dublin	All-Ireland Hurling Final	1–9 (12)	1–8 (11)	
1905	Croke Park, Dublin	All-Ireland Hurling Final	7–7 (28)	2–9 (15)	
1907	Croke Park, Dublin	All-Ireland Hurling Final	3–12 (21)	4–8 (20)	
1912	Croke Park, Dublin	All-Ireland Hurling Final	2–1 (7)	1–3 (6)	
1926	Croke Park, Dublin	All-Ireland Hurling Final	2–0 (6)	4–6 (18)	
1931	Croke Park, Dublin	All-Ireland Hurling Final	1–6 (9)	1–6 (9)	
1931	Croke Park, Dublin	All-Ireland Hurling Final Replay	2–5 (11)	2–5 (11)	
1931	Croke Park, Dublin	All-Ireland Hurling Final 2nd Replay	3–4 (13)	5–8 (23)	
1939	Croke Park, Dublin	All-Ireland Hurling Final	2–7 (13)	3–3 (12)	
1946	Croke Park, Dublin	All-Ireland Hurling Final	3–8 (17)	7–5 (26)	
1947	Croke Park, Dublin	All-Ireland Hurling Final	0–14 (14)	2–7 (13)	
1966	Croke Park, Dublin	All-Ireland Hurling Final	1–10 (13)	3–9 (18)	
1969	Croke Park, Dublin	All-Ireland Hurling Final	2–15 (21)	2–9 (15)	
1972	Croke Park, Dublin	All-Ireland Hurling Final	3–24 (33)	5–11 (26)	
1978	Croke Park, Dublin	All-Ireland Hurling Final	2–8 (14)	1–15 (18)	
1982	Croke Park, Dublin	All-Ireland Hurling Final	3–18 (27)	1–13 (16)	
1983	Croke Park, Dublin	All-Ireland Hurling Final	2–14 (20)	2–12 (18)	
1992	Croke Park, Dublin	All-Ireland Hurling Final	3–10 (19)	1–12 (15)	
1999	Croke Park, Dublin	All-Ireland Hurling Final	0–12 (12)	0–13 (13)	
2003	Croke Park, Dublin	All-Ireland Hurling Final	1–14 (17)	1–11 (14)	
2004	Croke Park, Dublin	All-Ireland Hurling Final	0–9 (9)	0–17 (17)	

== Paths to the final ==
=== Kilkenny ===
10 June 2006
LSHC
Semi-Final

Kilkenny	1–23 – 1–9	Westmeath

19:00 – Cusack Park
Attendance: 6,891
Referee: John Sexton

2 July 2006
LSHC
Final

Kilkenny	1–23 – 2–12	Wexford

16:00 – Croke Park
Attendance: 44,081
Referee: Diarmuid Kirwan

22 July 2006
AISHC
Quarter-Final

Kilkenny	2–22 – 3–14	Galway

18:00 – Semple Stadium
Attendance: 33,000

13 August 2006
AISHC
Semi-Final

Kilkenny	2–21 – 1–16	Clare

16:00 – Croke Park
Attendance: 70,978

=== Cork ===
28 May 2006
MSHC
Semi-Final

Cork	0–20 – 0–14	Clare

16:00 – Semple Stadium
Attendance: 42,000
Referee: Barry Kelly

25 June 2006
MSHC
Final

Cork	2–14 – 1–14	Tipperary

16:00 – Semple Stadium
Attendance: 53,286
Referee: Dickie Murphy

22 July 2006
AISHC
Quarter-Final

Cork	0–19 – 0–18	Limerick

16:15 – Semple Stadium
Attendance: 33,000

6 August 2006
AISHC
Semi-Final

Cork	1–16 – 1–15	Waterford

16:00 – Croke Park
Attendance: 61,753
Referee: Brian Gavin (Offaly)

== Match details ==
3 September 2006 Final	Kilkenny	1-16 - 1-13	Cork	Croke Park
15:30	H. Shefflin 0-8 (0-5 frees); A. Fogarty 1-3; M. Comerford, D. Lyng, J. Fitzpatrick, R. Power and E. Brennan 0-1 each.	Report	B. O’Connor 1-4 (0-1 free); J. Deane 0-6 (0-5 frees); N. McCarthy, J. O’Connor and J. Gardiner 0-1 each.	Attendance: 82,275; Referee: B Kelly (Westmeath)

Kilkenny; Black and amber striped shirts/White shorts/Black and amber socks	1–16 – 1–13 (final score after 70 minutes)	Cork; Red shirts/White shorts/Red and white socks
Manager: Brian Cody Team: James McGarry (GK); Mick Kavanagh; Noel Hickey; Jackie Tyrell (Capt.); James Ryall; John Tennyson; Tommy Walsh; James 'Cha' Fitzpatrick (0–1); Derek Lyng (0–1); Richie Power (0–1); Henry Shefflin (0–8); Eoin Larkin; Eddie Brennan (0–1); Martin Comerford (0–1); Aidan Fogarty (1–3) Substitutes: Willie O'Dwyer; Richie Mullally	Half-time: 1-08 : 0–08 Competition: All-Ireland Senior Hurling Championship (Final) Date: 15.30 BST; Sunday, 3 September 2006 Venue: Croke Park, Dublin Attendance: 82,275 Referee: Barry Kelly (Westmeath) Match rules: 70 minutes. Replay if scores still level. Maximum of 5 substitutions.	Manager: John Allen Team: Donal Óg Cusack (GK); Brian Murphy; Diarmuid O'Sullivan; Pat Mulcahy (Capt.); John Gardiner (0–1); Ronan Curran; Seán Óg Ó hAilpín; Tom Kenny; Jerry O'Connor (0–1); Timmy McCarthy; Niall McCarthy (0–1); Ben O'Connor (1–4); Neil Ronan; Brian Corcoran; Joe Deane (0–6) Substitutes: Cian O'Connor; Kieran Murphy; Wayne Sherlock; Cathal Naughton; Conor Cusack
