= 1998 Kilkenny Intermediate Hurling Championship =

- Teams: 12
- Champions: Clara (2nd title); Robert Shortall (captain); Nicky Cashin (manager)
- Runners-up: Mooncoin; Mark Tyler (captain); Eddie O'Connor (manager)

The 1998 Kilkenny Intermediate Hurling Championship was the 34th staging of the Kilkenny Intermediate Hurling Championship since its establishment by the Kilkenny County Board in 1929.

The final was played on 15 November 1998 at Nowlan Park in Kilkenny, between Clara and Mooncoin, in what was their first meeting in the final in four years. Clara won the match by 0–12 to 0–10 to claim their second championship title overall and a first championship title in 16 years.

== Results ==
=== Final ===
15 November 1998 Final	Clara	0-12 - 0-10	Mooncoin	Nowlan Park
	A Prendergast 0-5, R Shortall 0-3, B Barcoe 0-2, J Casey 0-2.		M Walsh 0-6, T Murphy 0-2, B Quinn 0-1, M Purcell 0-1.
