= Darragh Egan =

Tipperary hurler

Personal information
- Born: 5 February 1986 (age 40) Kiladangan, County Tipperary, Ireland
- Occupation: Primary school principal
- Height: 6 ft 2 in (188 cm)

Sport
- Sport: Hurling
- Position: Forward / Goalkeeper
Club
- Years: Club
- Kildangan
Club titles
- Tipperary titles: 1
College
- Years: College
- NUI Galway
College titles
- Fitzgibbon titles: 0
Inter-county
Years	County	Apps (scores)
2005–2015	Tipperary	10 (3–07)
Inter-county titles
- Munster titles: 2
- All-Irelands: 1
- NHL: 1
- All Stars: 0

Darragh Egan (born 5 February 1986) is an Irish hurling manager and former player who managed the Wexford senior hurling team from 2021 until 2023. He is a former player with club side Kiladangan and the Tipperary senior hurling team.

== Playing career ==
Egan first came to prominence at club and underage levels with the Kiladangan club. He had just progressed onto the top adult team when the club won the All-Ireland Club Championship at intermediate level in 2005. He was sub-goalkeeper when Kiladangan beat Loughmore-Castleiney to win their inaugural County Senior Championship title in 2020. Egan first appeared on the inter-county scene as a member of the Tipperary minor team that won the Munster Minor Championship in 2003 before lining out in the 2006 All-Ireland under-21 final replay defeat by Kilkenny. By this stage he was also a member of the Tipperary senior hurling team after making his debut during the 2005 league. Egan maintained an association with the team for a decade and was a non-playing substitute for their 2010 All-Ireland Championship success. His other honours include two Munster Championship medals and a National Hurling League title.

== Management career ==
In October 2018, Egan was named by new Tipperary manager Liam Sheedy as a coach of the Tipperary senior hurling team. His first season with the team ended with Tipperary beating Kilkenny in the 2019 All-Ireland final. After the management team stepped down after three seasons in charge, Egan was appointed manager of the Wexford senior hurling team in September 2021.

In July 2023, Egan left his role as Wexford manager after two seasons in charge.

== Personal life ==
Egan, his wife Sarah and mother Mary featured in an episode of RTÉ’s Room to Improve in 2016 following his inter-county retirement; by that stage, at the age of thirty, Egan was principal of Kiladangan national school.

== Career statistics ==
Team	Year	National League			Munster		All-Ireland		Total	
Team	Year	Division	Apps	Score	Apps	Score	Apps	Score	Apps	Score
Tipperary	2005	Division 1B	5	2-03	1	0-00	1	0-00	7	2-03
Tipperary	2006	Division 1B	6	0-15	0	0-00	0	0-00	6	0-15
Tipperary	2007	Division 1B	4	0-00	3	2-05	3	0-02	10	2-07
Tipperary	2008	Division 1B	3	0-01	1	0-00	0	0-00	4	0-01
Tipperary	2009	Division 1	0	0-00	0	0-00	0	0-00	0	0-00
Tipperary	2010	Division 1	2	0-02	0	0-00	1	1-00	3	1-02
Tipperary	2011	Division 1	0	0-00	0	0-00	0	0-00	0	0-00
Tipperary	2012	Division 1A	0	0-00	0	0-00	0	0-00	0	0-00
Tipperary	2013	Division 1A	0	0-00	0	0-00	0	0-00	0	0-00
Tipperary	2014	Division 1A	2	0-00	0	0-00	0	0-00	2	0-00
Tipperary	2015	Division 1A	3	0-00	0	0-00	0	0-00	3	0-00
Career total			25	2-21	5	2-05	5	1-02	35	5-28

== Honours ==
=== Player ===
Kiladangan

- Tipperary Senior Hurling Championship: 2020
- North Tipperary Senior Hurling Championship: 2008, 2013, 2015, 2016
- All-Ireland Intermediate Club Hurling Championship: 2005
- Munster Intermediate Club Hurling Championship: 2005
- Tipperary Intermediate Hurling Championship: 2004

Tipperary

- All-Ireland Senior Hurling Championship: 2010
- Munster Senior Hurling Championship: 2008, 2015
- National Hurling League: 2008
- All-Ireland Intermediate Hurling Championship: 2013
- Munster Intermediate Hurling Championship: 2013
- Munster Under-21 Hurling Championship: 2006
- Munster Minor Hurling Championship: 2003

=== Management ===
Tipperary

- All-Ireland Senior Hurling Championship: 2019

Sporting positions
Preceded by Davy Fitzgerald	Wexford Senior Hurling Team Manager; 2021–2023	Succeeded by Vacant
