= 2007 Kilkenny Intermediate Hurling Championship =

- Teams: 12
- Champions: Clara (3rd title); Conor Phelan (captain); Maurice Power (manager)
- Runners-up: St Lachtain's

The 2007 Kilkenny Intermediate Hurling Championship was the 43rd staging of the Kilkenny Intermediate Hurling Championship since its establishment by the Kilkenny County Board in 1929.

The final was played on 21 October 2007 at Nowlan Park in Kilkenny, between Clara and St Lachtain's, in what was their first ever meeting in the final. Clara won the match by 1–15 to 0–12 to claim their third championship title overall and a first championship title in nine years.

== Results ==
=== Final ===
21 October 2007 Final	Clara	1-15 - 0-11	St Lachtain's	Nowlan Park
	J Nolan 1-3, K Hogan 0-4, A Murphy 0-3, TJ Fitzgerald 0-2, D Langton 0-1, L Ryan 0-1, E O'Shea 0-1.		E Guinan 0-6, N Waldron 0-1, N McGree 0-1, B Beckett 0-1, J Kavanagh 0-1, O O'Connor 0-1.
