= Conor Phelan =

Irish hurler

Personal information
- Native name: Conchur Ó Faoláin (Irish)
- Born: 1983 (age 42–43) Clara, County Kilkenny, Ireland
- Height: 6 ft 1 in (185 cm)

Sport
- Sport: Hurling
- Position: Left wing-forward
Club
Years	Club	Apps (scores)
2000-2014	Clara	15 (1-18)
Club titles
- Kilkenny titles: 1
College
- Years: College
- Waterford Institute of Technology
College titles
- Fitzgibbon titles: 2
Inter-county
Years	County	Apps (scores)
2003-2005	Kilkenny	8 (1-03)
Inter-county titles
- Leinster titles: 2
- All-Irelands: 1
- NHL: 2
- All Stars: 0

Conor Phelan (born 1983) is an Irish hurler who played as a left wing-forward for the Kilkenny senior team.

Phelan joined the team during the 2003 championship and made several appearances as a substitute until illness forced him to retire after just two seasons. During that time he won one All-Ireland winners' medal.

At club level Phelan plays with the Clara club.

In January 2021, he joined Kilkenny's senior hurling management team for the 2021 season.

== Career statistics ==
Team	Year	National League			Leinster		All-Ireland		Total	
Team	Year	Division	Apps	Score	Apps	Score	Apps	Score	Apps	Score
Kilkenny	2003	Division 1	3	0-03	2	1-01	1	0-00	6	1-04
Kilkenny	2004	Division 1	6	0-10	1	0-00	2	0-01	9	0-11
Kilkenny	2005	Division 1	3	0-00	2	0-01	0	0-00	5	0-01
Career total			12	0-13	5	1-02	3	0-01	20	1-16

== Honours ==
Waterford Institute of Technology

- Fitzgibbon Cup: 2003, 2004

Clara

- Kilkenny Senior Hurling Championship: 2013
- Kilkenny Intermediate Hurling Championship: 2007

Kilkenny

- All-Ireland Senior Hurling Championship: 2003
- Leinster Senior Hurling Championship: 2003, 2005
- National Hurling League: 2003, 2005
- All-Ireland Intermediate Hurling Championship: 2008
- Leinster Intermediate Hurling Championship: 2008
- All-Ireland Under-21 Hurling Championship: 2003, 2004
- Leinster Under-21 Hurling Championship: 2003, 2004
- Leinster Minor Hurling Championship: 2001
