= 2004–05 All-Ireland Intermediate Club Hurling Championship =

Championship Details
- Dates: 31 October 2004 – 28 March 2005
- Teams: 12

All Ireland Champions
- Winners: Kiladangan (1st win)
- Captain: Ger Slattery

All Ireland Runners-up
- Runners-up: Carrickshock
- Captain: Jamie Power

Provincial Champions
- Munster: Kildangan
- Leinster: Carrickshock
- Ulster: Carey Faughs
- Connacht: St. Thomas's

Championship Statistics
- Top Scorer: Darragh Egan (2-29)

The 2004–05 All-Ireland Intermediate Club Hurling Championship was the inaugural staging of the All-Ireland Intermediate Club Hurling Championship since its establishment by the Gaelic Athletic Association. The championship ran from 31 October 2004 to 28 March 2005.

The All-Ireland final was played on 28 March 2005 at Semple Stadium in Thurles, between Kiladangan from Tipperary and Carrickshock from Kilkenny, in what was their first ever meeting in the final. Kiladangan won the match by 2-13 to 1-13 to claim their first All-Ireland title.

Kiladangan's Darragh Egan was the championship's top scorer with 2-29.

== Connacht Intermediate Club Hurling Championship ==
=== Connacht final ===
5 December 2004 Final	St. Thomas'	w/o – scr.	Ballyhaunis	Pearse Stadium

== Leinster Intermediate Club Hurling Championship ==
=== Leinster final ===
13 November 2004 Final	St. Patrick's	0–06 – 2–16	Carrickshock	St. Patrick's Grounds
	S Ryan 0-3, D Grannells 0-2, P Curley 0-1.		R Power 0-8, J Power 1-1, S Gibbons 1-0, G Moran 0-3, P Farrell 0-2, P Cleary 0-1.

== Munster Intermediate Club Hurling Championship ==
=== Munster quarter-final ===
28 November 2004 Quarter-final	Kildangan	2-17 - 1-13	St. Catherine's	MacDonagh Park
	D Egan 0-9, B Kelly 1-1, E Nolan 1-0, J Maher 0-3, LK Flannery 0-1, T Connors 0-1, H Flannery 0-1, C Hayes 0-1.		M Hegarty 0-8, S Kearney 1-3, C Casey 0-1, K Morrisson 0-1.	Referee: D O'Driscoll (Limerick)

=== Munster semi-finals ===
29 November 2004 Semi-final	Dromin-Athlacca	1-08 - 0-09	Portlaw	FitzGerald Park
	P Neenan 0-6, G Kelleher 1-0, O O'Leary 0-1, J Kelleher 0-1.		F Kelly 0-8, M Donnelly 0-1.	Referee: J Ryan (Tipperary)

4 December 2004 Semi-final	Kildangan	1-17 - 0-11	Smith O'Brien's	MacDonagh Park
	D Egan 1-7, T Connors 0-4, C Hayes 0-2, D Hackett 0-2, E Nolan 0-1, G Slattery 0-1, B Kelly 0-1.		S O'Brien 0-7, T Howard 0-1, W Neary 0-1, B Foley 0-1, J Cusack 0-1.	Referee: J O'Mahony (Cork)

=== Munster final ===
12 December 2004 Final	Dromin-Athlacca	1–04 – 1–10	Kildangan	Gaelic Grounds
	D Scully 1-0, P Neenan 0-3, O O'Leary 0-1, P Storan 0-1.		D Egan 0-5, C Hayes 1-1, T Connors 0-2, B Kelly 0-1, E Nolan 0-1.	Referee: A Heagney (Clare)

== Ulster Intermediate Club Hurling Championship ==
=== Ulster final ===
31 October 2004 Final	Carey Faughs	0–07 – 0–06	Eoghan Rua	St. Patrick's Park

== All-Ireland Intermediate Club Hurling Championship ==
=== All-Ireland quarter-final ===
28 November 2004 Quarter-final	Robert Emmetts	0–09 – 1–03	Carey Faughs	Emerald GAA Grounds
	J McGaughan (0-3), G Fenton (0-2), C Buckley (0-2), S Quinn (0-1), F McMahon (0-1).		M McAuley (1-2), P McShane (0-1).	Referee: É Morris (Dublin)

=== All-Ireland semi-finals ===
13 February 2005 Semi-final	Carrickshock	2–12 – 0–05	Robert Emmetts	Bennettsbridge Grounds
	J Power 1-3, M Rohan 1-1, R Power 0-3, J Dalton 0-1, P Farrell 0-1, M Rice 0-1, J Moran 0-1, S Gibbons 0-1.		J McCaughan 0-3, F McMahon 0-1, C Buckley 0-1.	Referee: D Kirwan (Cork)

13 February 2005 Semi-final	Kildangan	1–10 – 0–07	St. Thomas’s	St. Brendan's Park
	P Lynch 0-5, D Hackett 1-0, T Connors 0-2, D Egan 0-2, H Flannery 0-1.		K Burke 0-4, R Murray 0-2, M Headd 0-1.	Referee: B Gavin (Offaly)

=== All-Ireland final ===
28 March 2005 Final	Kildangan	2–13 – 1–13	Carrickshock	Semple Stadium
	D Egan 1-6, C Hayes 1-0, P Lynch 0-3, T Connors 0-2, L K Flannery, H Flannery 0-1 each.		R Power 1-3, J Power 0-3, J Moran 0-3, P Farrell 0-2, M Rice, J Dalton 0-1 each.	Referee: M Haverty (Galway)

== Championship statistics ==
=== Top scorers ===
Rank	Player	Club	Tally	Total	Matches	Average
1	Darragh Egan	Kiladangan	2-29	35	5	7.00
2	Richie Power	Carrickshock	1-14	17	3	5.66
3	Jamie Power	Carrickshock	2-07	13	3	4.33
