= 2006 All-Ireland Under-21 Hurling Championship =

All-Ireland Under-21 Hurling Championship 2006
Championship Details
- Dates: 31 May 2006 – 16 September 2006
- Teams: 14

All Ireland Champions
- Winners: Kilkenny (10th win)
- Captain: Michael Fennelly
- Manager: Adrian Finan

All Ireland Runners-up
- Runners-up: Tipperary
- Captain: David Young
- Manager: Tom Fogarty

Provincial Champions
- Munster: Tipperary
- Leinster: Kilkenny
- Ulster: Antrim
- Connacht: Not Played

Championship Statistics
- Matches Played: 13
- Top Scorer: Darragh Egan (3-23)

The 2006 All-Ireland Under-21 Hurling Championship was the 43rd staging of the All-Ireland Under-21 Hurling Championship, the Gaelic Athletic Association's premier inter-county hurling tournament for players under the age of twenty-one. The championship began on 31 May 2006 and ended on 16 September 2006.

Galway were the defending champions but were defeated by Kilkenny in the All-Ireland semi-final.

On 16 September 2006, Kilkenny won the championship following a 1-11 to 0-11 defeat of Tipperary in a replay of the All-Ireland final. This was their 10th All-Ireland title overall and their first since 2004.

Tipperary's Darragh Egan was the championship's top scorer with 3-23.

== Results ==
=== Leinster Under-21 Hurling Championship ===
Quarter-final

| 31 May 2006 Quarter-final | Laois | 1-12 - 0-16 | Wexford | O'Moore Park, Portlaoise |
| | J Brophy 1-0, Z Keenan 0-3, J Walsh 0-2, J Rowney 0-2, D Bergin 0-2, G Delahunty 0-1, S Lowry 0-1, W Hyland 0-1. | | S Nolan 0-7, PJ Nolan 0-2, C Lyng 0-2, C O’Connor 0-2, T Waters 0-1, M Doyle 0-1, R Kehoe 0-1. | Referee: R Holohan (Kildare) |

Semi-finals

| 21 June 2006 Semi-final | Kilkenny | 3-17 - 1-6 | Wexford | John Locke Park, Callan |
| | TJ Reid 2-4, J Fitzpatrick 0-7, E O’Donoghue 1-0, P Hogan, A Murphy, R Power, D McCormack, J Broderick, M Nolan 0-1 each. | | S Nolan 0-3, G Flood 1-0, R Kehoe, PJ Nolan and M Doyle 0-1 each. |

| 21 June 2006 Semi-final | Dublin | 0-17 - 1-11 | Offaly | Parnell Park, Dublin |
| | K O’Reilly 0-7, E Moran and A McCrabbe 0-2 each, G Morris 0-2, K Dunne and J McCaffrey 0-1 each. | | E Bevans 1-3, S Dooley, D Hayden and J Bergin 0-2 each, P Cleary and D Kenny 0-1 each. |

Final

| 27 July 2006 Final | Kilkenny | 2-18 - 2-10 | Dublin | Nowlan Park, Kilkenny |
| | D McCormack (1-5, four frees), M Nolan (1-3), A Murphy (0-3), D Fogarty (0-2); J Fitzpatrick (0-2, one free); TJ Reid (0-1), E O'Donoghue (0-1), P Hogan (0-1). | Report | K O'Reilly (0-7, six frees); A McCrabbe (1-0), D Connolly (1-0), P Carton (0-1), E Moran (0-1), G Morris (0-1). | Referee: F Smyth (Meath) |

=== Munster Under-21 Hurling Championship ===
Quarter-finals

| 7 June 2006 Quarter-final | Clare | w/o - scr. | Kerry | Cusack Park, Ennis |

| 7 June 2006 Quarter-final | Waterford | 0-11 - 0-10 | Limerick | Fraher Field, Dungarvan |
| | M Gorman 0-5, T Power 0-2, S O’Sullivan 0-1, D Russell 0-1, G O’Connor 0-1, J Nagle 0-1. | | D Breen 0-5, M Fitzgerald 0-2, P Cregan 0-1, G O’Mahony 0-1, C Mullane 0-1. | Referee: S McMahon (Clare) |

Semi-finals

| 12 July 2006 Semi-final | Cork | 3-17 - 2-12 | Waterford | Páirc Uí Chaoimh, Cork |
| | B Barry 2-4; M O’Sullivan 0-6 (frees); R Conway 1-1; P Cronin 0-2; M Harrington, K Canty, E Cadogan, C Murphy 0-1 each. | Report | S O’Sullivan 0-4; M Gorman 1-2; T Power 1-1; L Lawlor, R Foley, D Hickey, G O’Connor, M Gaffney 0-1 each. | Referee: B White (Tipperary) |

| 12 July 2006 Semi-final | Tipperary | 1-17 - 0-17 | Clare | Semple Stadium, Thurles |
| | D Egan (1-5, 0-5 frees), S Lillis (0-3, 0-1 free), N Teehan (0-3), R Ruth (0-2), J Woodlock, R O’Dwyer, R McLoughney, G Kennedy (0-1 each). | Report | M Flaherty (0-7, 0-6 frees, 0-1 65), T Kearse (0-3), J Clancy (0-2), Damien O’Halloran (0-2), M Gaffney, G Arthur, C Lafferty (0-1 each). | Referee: D Richardson (Limerick). |

Final

| 9 August 2006 Final | Tipperary | 3-11 - 0-13 | Cork | Semple Stadium, Thurles |
| | D Egan (1-4 (3f)), R McLoughney (1-0), D Hickey (1-0), R Ruth (0-3), S Lillis (0-2 (1f)); J Woodlock (0-1), N Teehan (0-1). | Report | C Naughton (0-3), P Cronin (0-3); M O'Sullivan (0-3 (3f)), E Cadogan (0-2); R Conway (0-1), J Bowles (0-1). | Referee: A Heagney (Clare) |

=== Ulster Under-21 Hurling Championship ===
Final

| 26 July 2006 Final | Antrim | 2-15 - 3-11 | Down | Casement Park, Belfast |
| | Joey Scullion 0-8, D Laverty 1-1, S McNaughton 0-2, B McDermott 0-2, C McFall 0-1, P McGill 0-1; C Duffin 0-1. | Report | C McManus 2-5, B McGourty 1-3, C Coulter 0-1; A McGuinness 0-1, K McCarthy 0-1. | Referee: J Devlin (Tyrone) |

=== All-Ireland Under-21 Hurling Championship ===
Semi-finals

| 19 August 2006 Semi-final | Galway | 2-12 - 1-24 | Kilkenny | O'Connor Park, Tullamore |
| | J Canning (2-4 (0-1f, 0-1 sl)), K Wade (0-3 (0-2f, 0-1 ‘65’)), A Keary (0-1 (0-1 sl), F Coone (0-1), D Reilly (0-1), N Healy (0-1 (0-1f)), C Kavanagh (0-1). | Report | J Fitzpatrick (0-8 (0-5f, 0-3 ‘65’)), TJ Reid (0-5), R Power (1-1), P Hogan (0-4 (0-1 sl)); A Healy (0-2), A Murphy (0-2), M Fennelly (0-1); M Nolan (0-1). | Referee: M Wadding (Waterford) |

| 20 August 2006 Semi-final | Tipperary | 5-19 - 0-7 | Antrim | Parnell Park, Dublin |
| | S Lillis 0-5 (3f, one 65), R O'Dwyer, D O'Hanlon 1-1 each, R Ruth, D Egan (3f) 0-4 each, R McLoughney, N Teehan, D Sheppard 1-0 each, P Austin, D Hickey 0-2 each. | Report | R Mc Donnell 0-3 (1f), J Scullion 0-2 (1f, one '65') Brendan McDermott, D Laverty 0-1 each. | Referee: D Murphy (Wexford) |

Final

| 10 September 2006 Final | Kilkenny | 2-14 - 2-14 | Tipperary | Croke Park, Dublin |
| | J Fitzpatrick 0-6, R Power 1-1, R Hogan 1-1, A Murphy 0-3, TJ Reid 0-2, P Hogan 0-1. | Report | D Egan 1-5, N Teehan 1-1, S Lillis 0-3, J Woodlock 0-2, R O’Dwyer 0-1, D Young 0-1, D Sheppard 0-1. | Referee: M Haverty (Galway) |

| 16 September 2006 Final replay | Tipperary | 0-11 - 1-11 | Kilkenny | Semple Stadium, Thurles |
| | D Egan 0-5 (5f); D O'Hanlon, P Austin 0-2 each; J Woodcock, R Ruth 0-1 each. | Report | R Power 0-6 (4f); P Hogan 1-0; A Murphy 0-3; J Fitzpatrick, R Hogan 0-1 each. | Referee: B Gavin (Offaly) |

== Scoring statistics ==
Top Scorer Overall

| Rank | Player | County | Tally | Total | Matches | Average |
|---|---|---|---|---|---|---|
| 1 | Darragh Egan | Tipperary | 3-23 | 32 | 5 | 6.40 |
| 2 | James Fitzpatrick | Kilkenny | 0-24 | 24 | 5 | 4.80 |
| 3 | T. J. Reid | Kilkenny | 2-12 | 18 | 5 | 5.60 |
| 4 | Richie Power | Kilkenny | 2-9 | 15 | 4 | 3.50 |
| 5 | Kevin O'Reilly | Dublin | 0-14 | 14 | 2 | 7.00 |
| 6 | Stephen Lillis | Tipperary | 0-13 | 13 | 5 | 2.60 |
| 7 | Colm McManus | Down | 2-05 | 11 | 1 | 11.00 |
| 7 | Niall Teehan | Tipperary | 2-05 | 11 | 5 | 2.20 |
| 9 | Brendan Barry | Cork | 2-04 | 10 | 2 | 5.00 |
| 9 | Joe Canning | Galway | 2-04 | 10 | 1 | 10.00 |
| 9 | Paddy Hogan | Kilkenny | 1-07 | 10 | 5 | 2.00 |
| 9 | Stephen Nolan | Wexford | 0-10 | 10 | 2 | 5.00 |
| 9 | Joey Scullion | Antrim | 0-10 | 10 | 2 | 5.00 |

Top Scorer In A Single Game

| Rank | Player | County | Tally | Total | Opposition |
|---|---|---|---|---|---|
| 1 | Colm McManus | Down | 2-05 | 11 | Antrim |
| 2 | T. J. Reid | Kilkenny | 2-04 | 10 | Wexford |
| 2 | Brendan Barry | Cork | 2-04 | 10 | Waterford |
| 2 | Joe Canning | Galway | 2-04 | 10 | Kilkenny |
| 5 | David McCormack | Kilkenny | 1-05 | 8 | Dublin |
| 5 | Darragh Egan | Tipperary | 1-05 | 8 | Clare |
| 5 | Darragh Egan | Tipperary | 1-05 | 8 | Kilkenny |
| 5 | Joey Scullion | Antrim | 0-08 | 8 | Down |
| 5 | James Fitzpatrick | Kilkenny | 0-08 | 8 | Galway |
| 10 | Darragh Egan | Tipperary | 1-04 | 7 | Cork |
| 10 | Stephen Nolan | Wexford | 0-07 | 7 | Cork |
| 10 | James Fitzpatrick | Kilkenny | 0-07 | 7 | Wexford |
| 10 | Kevin O'Reilly | Dublin | 0-07 | 7 | Offaly |
| 10 | Kevin O'Reilly | Dublin | 0-07 | 7 | Kilkenny |
| 10 | Mark Flaherty | Clare | 0-07 | 7 | Tipperary |
