= 2006 All-Ireland Under-21 Hurling Championship final =

2006 All-Ireland Under-21 Hurling Final
- Event: 2006 All-Ireland Under-21 Hurling Championship
Kilkenny	Tipperary
2–14 1–11	2–14 0–11
- Date: 10 September 2006; 16 September 2006(replay)
- Venue: Croke Park; Semple Stadium (replay)
- Referee: Michael Haverty; Brian Gavin (replay)

The 2006 All-Ireland Under-21 Hurling Championship final was a hurling match played at Croke Park, Kilkenny on 10 October 2006 to determine the winners of the 2006 All-Ireland Under-21 Hurling Championship, the 43rd season of the All-Ireland Under-21 Hurling Championship, a tournament organised by the Gaelic Athletic Association for the champion teams of the four provinces of Ireland. The final was contested by Kilkenny of Leinster and Tipperary of Munster, with the game ending in a 2–14 apiece draw. The replay took place on 16 September 2006, with Kilkenny winning by 1–11 to 0–11.

== Details ==
=== Drawn game ===
10 September 2006

Kilkenny	2–14 – 2–14	Tipperary
J Fitzpatrick (0–6, all frees), R Hogan (1–1), R Power (1–1), A Murphy (0–3), TJ Reid (0–2), P Hogan (0–1).	Report	D Egan (1–5, three frees), N Teehan (1–1), S Lillis (0–3, two frees), J Woodlock (0–2), R O'Dwyer (0–1), D Sheppard (0–1), D Young (0–1).

Croke Park, Dublin
Referee: M Haverty (Galway)

=== Replay ===
16 September 2006

Kilkenny	1–11 – 0–11	Tipperary
R Power (0–6), P Hogan (1–0), A Murphy (0–3), J Fitzpatrick (0–1), R Hogan (0–1).	Report	D Egan (0–5), P Austin (0–2), D O'Hanlon (0–2), R Ruth (0–1), J Woodlock (0–1).

Semple Stadium, Thurles
Referee: B Gavin (Offaly)
