= 2005 All-Ireland Under-21 Hurling Championship =

All-Ireland Under-21 Hurling Championship 2005
Championship Details
- Dates: 31 May 2005 – 18 September 2005
- Teams: 15

All Ireland Champions
- Winners: Galway (8th win)
- Captain: Kenneth Burke
- Manager: Vincent Mullins

All Ireland Runners-up
- Runners-up: Kilkenny
- Captain: Richie Power
- Manager: Adrian Finan

Provincial Champions
- Munster: Cork
- Leinster: Kilkenny
- Ulster: Derry
- Connacht: Not Played

Championship Statistics
- Matches Played: 14

The 2005 All-Ireland Under-21 Hurling Championship was the 42nd staging of the All-Ireland Under-21 Hurling Championship, the Gaelic Athletic Association's premier inter-county hurling tournament for players under the age of twenty-one. The championship began on 31 May 2005 and ended on 18 September 2005.

Kilkenny were the defending champions.

On 18 September 2005, Galway won the championship following a 1-15 to 1-14 defeat of Kilkenny in the All-Ireland final. This was their 8th All-Ireland title and their first since 1996.

== Results ==
=== Leinster Under-21 Hurling Championship ===
Quarter-final

31 May 2005 Quarter-final	Carlow	0-12 - 3-22	Kilkenny	Dr. Cullen Park, Carlow
	E Reid 2-3, E Larkin 0-9, R Power 0-5, J Fitzpatrick 1-1, W O’Dwyer, M Fennelly, D McCormack and T Frisby 0-1 each.		R Dunbar 0-7, S Kavanagh 0-3, K English, M Ralph 0-1 each.

Semi-finals

22 June 2005 Semi-final	Wexford	0-15 - 2-13	Kilkenny	Wexford Park, Wexford
	S Nolan 0-9, M Kelly 0-3, M Doyle 0-1, J Berry 0-1, P White 0-1.		E Larkin 1-7, J Fitzpatrick 1-1, E Reid 0-2, M Rice 0-2, C Hoyne 0-1.	Referee: B Gavin (Offaly)

22 June 2005 Semi-final	Dublin	2-6 - 1-8	Offaly	O'Moore Park, Portlaoise
	S Mullen 0-4, P Carton 1-0, G Morris 1-0, M Carton 0-1, A Glennon 0-1.		D Hayden 1-1, C Slevin 0-4, T Bennett 0-1, A Egan 0-1, E Lee 0-1.	Referee: F Smith (Meath)

Final

20 July 2005 Final	Kilkenny	0-17 - 1-10	Dublin	Dr. Cullen Park, Carlow
	E Larkin 0-10, W O’Dwyer 0-2, E Reid 0-2, A Murphy 0-1, C Hoyne 0-1, D McCormack 0-1.		N Clarke 1-0, A McCrabbe 0-3, R Fallon 0-2, S Mullen 0-2, M Carton 0-1, E Moran 0-1, A Glennon 0-1.	Referee: J Owens (Wexford)

=== Munster Under-21 Hurling Championship ===
Quarter-finals

8 June 2005 Quarter-final	Waterford	0-11 - 2-16	Cork	Walsh Park, Waterford
	M Gorman 0-3, S Molumphy 0-2, G O'Connor 0-2; M Whelan 0-1, M Fives 0-1, A Kearney 0-1, K Stafford 0-1;		M O'Sullivan 1-6, S O'Sullivan 1-1, M Naughton 0-3, J Bowles 0-2, R Conway 0-1, B Barry 0-1, S O'Neill 0-1, D Dorris 0-1.	Referee: D Richardson (Limerick)

8 June 2005 Quarter-final	Limerick	4-19 - 2-4	Kerry	Gaelic Grounds, Limerick
	A O'Connor 1-7, A O'Shaughnessy 2-2, E Ryan 1-2, M Noonan 0-2; P McNamara 0-2, P Russell 0-1; P Kirby 0-1, D Breen 0-1; D Maloney 0-1.		J Egan 1-1; T Murnane 1-0, R Galvin 0-1; I McCarthy 0-1, T Brosnan 0-1.	Referee: P Casey (Waterford)

Semi-finals

13 July 2005 Semi-final	Cork	1-17 - 1-11	Clare	Semple Stadium, Thurles
	M O’Sullivan 1-4, M Naughton 0-5, R Conway 0-4, D Dorris 0-2, S O’Sullivan 0-1, J Bowles 0-1.		P Collins 1-1, K Neylon 0-4, P Donnellan 0-2, C Crowe 0-1, J Clancy 0-1, C McNamara 0-1, A Browne 0-1.	Referee: J McDonnell (Tipperary)

13 July 2005 Semi-final	Limerick	2-11 - 1-16	Tipperary	Gaelic Grounds, Limerick
	P Kirby 1-2, A O’Connor 0-4, P Russell 0-2, P McNamara 0-1, R Hayes 0-1.		D Egan 1-5, F Devanney 0-3, T Scroope 0-1, R O’Dwyer 0-1, T Collins 0-1, T Fitzgerald 0-1, C O’Brien 0-1, D O’Hanlon 0-1, P Shortt 0-1.

Final

3 August 2005 Final	Cork	4-8 - 0-13	Tipperary	Páirc Uí Chaoimh, Cork
	M O’Sullivan 2-2, D Dorris 1-2, K Hartnett 1-0, B Barry 0-1, S O’Neill 0-1, S O’Sullivan 0-1, M Naughton 0-1.		T Scroope 0-3, W Cully 0-2, C O’Brien 0-2, T Fitzgerald 0-2, E Sweeney 0-1, D Egan 0-1, R O’Dwyer 0-1, P Shortt 0-1.	Referee: G Hoey (Clare)

=== Ulster Under-21 Hurling Championship ===
Semi-final

20 July 2005 Semi-final	Derry	5-9 - 1-8	Down	Dean McGlinchey Park, Ballinascreen

Final

27 July 2005 Final	Antrim	w/o - scr.	Down	Casement Park, Belfast

=== All-Ireland Under-21 Hurling Championship ===
Semi-finals

27 August 2005 Semi-final	Galway	1-19 - 1-13	Cork	Gaelic Grounds, Limerick
	A Callanan 1-2, K Wade 0-6, N Healy 0-4, J Gantley 0-3, K Burke 0-2, E Ryan 0-1, G Mahon 0-1		M O’Sullivan 0-4, M Cussen 1-1, M Naughton 0-3, K Canty 0-2, B Barry 0-1, S O’Sullivan 0-1, C O’Connor 0-1

27 August 2005 Semi-final	Kilkenny	6-33 - 1-8	Antrim	Páirc Tailteann, Navan
	R Power 1-8, TJ Reid 2-1, E Reid 1-4, E Larkin 1-3, W O’Dwyer 1-3, J Fitzpatrick 0-8, A Murphy 0-5, E O’Gorman 0-1		J Scullion 0-7, A McDonnell 1-0, D McNaughton 0-1

Final

18 September 2005 Final	Galway	1-15 - 1-14	Kilkenny	Gaelic Grounds, Limerick
	K Wade 0-8, A Callanan 1-1, K Burke 0-2, D Collins 0-1, B Lucas 0-1, N Healy 0-1, C Dervan 0-1.	Report	E Larkin 1-9, J Fitzpatrick 0-2, W O’Dwyer 0-1, E Reid 0-1, M Fennelly 0-1.	Referee: J Sexton (Limerick)

== Scoring statistics ==
Top scorers overall

Rank	Player	Team	Tally	Total	Matches	Average
1	Eoin Larkin	Kilkenny	3-38	47	5	9.40
2	Maurice O'Sullivan	Cork	4-16	28	4	7.00
3	Eoin Reid	Kilkenny	3-12	21	5	4.20
4	James Fitzpatrick	Kilkenny	2-12	18	5	3.60
5	Richie Power	Kilkenny	1-13	16	5	3.20
6	Alan O'Connor	Limerick	1-11	14	2	7.00
6	Kerril Wade	Galway	0-14	14	2	7.00
8	Michael Naughten	Cork	0-12	12	4	3.00
9	Willie O'Dwyer	Kilkenny	1-07	10	5	2.00
10	Aonghus Callanan	Galway	2-03	9	2	4.50
10	Darragh Egan	Tipperary	1-06	9	2	4.50
10	Stephen Nolan	Wexford	0-09	9	1	9.00

Top scorers in a single game

Rank	Player	Team	Tally	Total	Opposition
1	Eoin Larkin	Kilkenny	1-09	12	Galway
2	Richie Power	Kilkenny	1-08	11	Antrim
3	Eoin Larkin	Kilkenny	1-07	10	Wexford
3	Alan O'Connor	Limerick	1-07	10	Kerry
3	Eoin Larkin	Kilkenny	0-10	10	Dublin
6	Eoin Reid	Kilkenny	2-03	9	Carlow
6	Maurice O'Sullivan	Cork	1-06	9	Waterford
6	Eoin Larkin	Kilkenny	0-09	9	Carlow
6	Stephen Nolan	Wexford	0-09	9	Kilkenny
10	Andrew O'Shaughnessy	Limerick	2-02	8	Kerry
10	Maurice O'Sullivan	Cork	2-02	8	Tipperary
10	Darragh Egan	Tipperary	1-05	8	Limerick
10	James Fitzpatrick	Kilkenny	0-08	8	Antrim
10	Kerril Wade	Galway	0-08	8	Kilkenny
