= Tony Carmody =

Irish hurler

Personal information
- Native name: Tónaí Ó Ceamada (Irish)
- Born: Inagh, County Clare
- Occupation: Garda

Sport
- Sport: Hurling
- Position: Right Half Forward
Clubs
- Years: Club
- 1998-present: Inagh, Inagh-Kilnamona, Sixmilebridge
Inter-county
Years	County	Apps (scores)
2001 - 2010 2012-2013	Clare	32 (4-48)

Tony Carmody (born 1981 in Inagh, County Clare) is an Irish sportsperson. He plays hurling with Sixmilebridge having transferred to the club known as the 'Bridge from Inagh-Kilnamona in 2011.

== Career ==
Carmody was a member of the Clare senior inter-county team from 2001 to 2010. In January 2010, Carmody announced his retirement from inter-county hurling. In 2011, Carmody played with the Clare Intermediate team in the Munster Intermediate Hurling Championship where he scored three points against Cork in the semi-final, he later captained Clare to their first ever Munster when they beat Limerick in the final, they went on to win a first All-Ireland Intermediate Hurling Championship when they beat Kilkenny in the final, he scored a goal in the game before having to go off with an injury. Having lived in Sixmilebridge for a number of years Carmody decided to throw his lot in with them, the Inagh native went on to represent his adopted club in the county final against Crusheen in October 2011 where they came out second best on the day. Carmody works as a Garda in Limerick. In 2012 Carmody was recalled to the senior panel by former goalkeeper and Waterford Davy Fitzgerald. He marked his return with 1-1 from corner forward in the Waterford Crystal replay against Limerick.
