= 1994 Kilkenny Intermediate Hurling Championship =

- Teams: 12
- Sponsor: Vale Oil
- Champions: Mooncoin (2nd title); J. Mahon (captain)
- Runners-up: Clara

The 1994 Kilkenny Intermediate Hurling Championship was the 30th staging of the Kilkenny Intermediate Hurling Championship since its establishment by the Kilkenny County Board in 1929.

The final was played on 16 October 1994 at Nowlan Park in Kilkenny, between Mooncoin and Clara, in what was their first ever meeting in the final. Mooncoin won the match by 2–14 to 1–09 to claim their second championship title overall and a first championship title in four years.

== Results ==
=== Final ===
| 16 October 1994 Final | Mooncoin | 2-14 - 1-09 | Clara | Nowlan Park |
| | M Walsh 2-8, E Mackey 0-4, M Purcell 0-2. | | P Barcoe 1-2, R Shortall 0-3, A Prendergast 0-3, J Nolan 0-1. |
