= 2002 All-Ireland Minor Hurling Championship =

All-Ireland Minor Hurling Championship 2002
Championship Details
- Dates: 13 April – 8 September 2002

All Ireland Champions
- Winners: Kilkenny (17th win)
- Captain: Michael Rice
- Manager: Nicky Cashin

All Ireland Runners-up
- Runners-up: Tipperary
- Captain: Patrick McCormack
- Manager: Paddy McCormack

Provincial Champions
- Munster: Tipperary
- Leinster: Kilkenny
- Ulster: Antrim
- Connacht: Not Played

Championship Statistics
- Top Scorer: Richard Flynn (4-23)

The 2002 All-Ireland Minor Hurling Championship was the 72nd staging of the All-Ireland Minor Hurling Championship. The championship began on 14 April 2002 and ended on 8 September 2002.

Cork entered the championship as defending champions, however, they were defeated by Galway in the All-Ireland quarter-final.

On 8 September 2002, Kilkenny won the championship after a 3-15 to 1-07 defeat of Tipperary in the All-Ireland final at Croke Park. This was their 17th championship title overall and their first title since 1993.

Wexford's Richard Flynn was the championship's top scorer with 4-23.

== Results ==
=== Leinster Minor Hurling Championship ===
Group A

Team	Matches				Score			Pts
Team	Pld	W	D	L	For	Against	Diff	Pts
Offaly	3	3	0	0	13-48	1-11	73	6
Kildare	3	2	0	1	4-31	11-21	-11	4
Meath	3	1	0	2	5-21	5-30	-9	2
Westmeath	3	0	0	3	3-14	8-52	-53	0

13 April 2002 Round 1	Kildare	0-06 - 6-10	Offaly	Conneff Park, Clane
	A Cahill 0-5, P Fitzgerald 0-1.		D Hayden 1-4, T Maher 1-2, S Delaney 1-2, E Franks 1-1, M Dwane 1-0, C Horan 1-0, S Carroll 0-1.	Referee: A Stapleton (Laois)

17 April 2002 Round 1	Meath	2-13 - 0-06	Westmeath	Athboy
	S Clynch 1-8, J Cummins 1-1, M Burke 0-1, P Ryan 0-1, E Dunne 0-1, S O'Toole 0-1.		A Corrigan 0-5, D McNicholas 0-1.	Referee: P Tobin (Dublin)

27 April 2002 Round 2	Offaly	2-12 - 0-04	Meath	St. Brendan's Park, Birr
	T Maher 1-2, M Dwane 1-1, E Bevans 0-4, C Horan 0-2, D Egan 0-1, E Franks 0-1, S Delaney 0-1.		S Moran 0-1, B Comer 0-1, S Clynch 0-1, P Egan 0-1.	Referee: D O'Donovan (Dublin)

28 April 2002 Round 2	Westmeath	2-07 - 1-13	Kildare	Cusack Park, Mullingar
	D McNicholas 2-2, J Fagan 0-4, S McGuire 0-1.		P Nolan 1-2, T Murphy 0-5, A Cahill 0-3, K Curran 0-2, M Divilly 0-1.	Referee: B Gavin (Offaly)

11 May 2002 Round 3	Westmeath	1-01 - 5-26	Offaly	St. Oliver Plunkett Park, Mullingar
	P Collins 1-0, A Corrigan 0-1.		M Dwane 1-6, T Bennett 2-2, S Delaney 1-2, C Egan 0-5, G O'Grady 0-5, K Hehir 1-0, E Bevans 0-3, S Carroll 0-3.

11 May 2002 Round 3	Kildare	3-12 - 3-04	Meath	Conneff Park, Clane
	T Ryan 2-0, A Cagill 0-6, C Doyle 1-0, M Divilly 0-3, P Ryan 0-1, T Murphy 0-1, T Fitzgerald 0-1.		M Burke 1-2, K Fitzmaurice 1-1, B McGowan 1-0, S Moran 0-1.	Referee: D O'Donovan (Dublin)

Group B

Team	Matches				Score			Pts
Team	Pld	W	D	L	For	Against	Diff	Pts
Carlow	3	2	1	0	9-45	2-23	43	5
Dublin	3	2	1	0	8-46	3-20	41	5
Laois	3	1	0	2	7-38	3-26	24	2
Wicklow	3	0	0	3	0-06	16-66	-108	0

13 April 2002 Round 1	Carlow	1-13 - 1-08	Laois	Dr. Cullen Park, Carlow
	K English 0-6, J Murphy 1-0, S Kavangh 0-3, P Kehoe 0-2, M Ralph 0-2.		J Rowney 1-0, J Brophy 0-3, R Gill 0-3, J Hooban 0-1, S Norton 0-1.

13 April 2002 Round 1	Wicklow	0-01 - 5-23	Dublin	Parnell Park, Arklow
	A Tiernan 0-1.		A Glennon 2-1, M Griffin 1-4, R Fallon 0-6, G Keogh 1-2, P McAvinue 0-4, T Sweeney 1-0, S O'Sullivan 0-3, W Purtil 0-2, D Mitchell 0-1.

27 April 2002 Round 2	Wicklow	0-01 - 4-22	Laois	Aughrim County Ground, Aughrim
	A Tierney 0-1.		C Healy 1-4, J Brophy 0-7, J Dunne 1-2, B Fitzgerald 1-1, K Murphy 1-0, C Comerford 0-3, J Rowney 0-2, T Drennan 0-1, J Delaney 0-1, A Dollard 0-1.	Referee: J Flynn (Offaly)

2 May 2002 Round 2	Dublin	1-11 - 1-11	Carlow	Páirc Uí Thúthail, Ayrfield
	M Griffin 0-6, G Morris 1-0; M Carton 0-2, R Fallon 0-1, G Keogh 0-1, A Glennon 0-1;		K English 1-5, M Ralph 0-2; R Minchin 0-1, B Cox 0-1, P Kehoe 0-1, J Murphy 0-1.	Referee: F McGowan (Meath)

11 May 2002 Round 3	Carlow	7-21 - 0-04	Wicklow	Dr. Cullen Park, Carlow
	P Kehoe 2-9, M Ralph 4-2, R Minchin 1-1, J Murphy 0-3, B Murphy 0-2 S Watchorn 0-1, B Cox 0-1, D Phelan 0-1, P Nolan 0-1.		A Tiernan 0-3, JJ Darcy 0-1.	Referee: S Whelan (Wexford)

11 May 2002 Round 3	Laois	2-08 - 2-12	Dublin	O'Moore Park, Portlaoise
	D Bergin 0-4, J Brophy 1-0, S Cotter 1-0, JJ Rowney 0-1, B Fitzgerald 0-1, C Comerford 0-1, Hooban 0-1.		G Morris 1-2, P McAvenie 1-1, M Griffin 0-3, P Fleury 0-2, G Keogh 0-2, A Glennon 0-2.

18 May 2002 Playoff	Dublin	1-08 - 0-10	Carlow	O'Moore Park, Portlaoise
	R Fallon 1-0, P McAvinue 0-3, A Glennon 0-2, M Griffin 0-2, M Carton 0-1.		K English 0-8, M Brennan 0-1, M Ralph 0-1.

Semi-finals

26 June 2002 Semi-final	Kilkenny	0-18 - 2-10	Dublin	O'Moore Park, Portlaoise
	R Power 0-6, J Fitzpatrick 0-5, S Coogan 0-2, C Hoyne 0-1, R Dowling 0-1, PJ Delaney 0-1, S Dowling 0-1, W O'Dwyer 0-1.		A Glennon 1-1, S O'Sullivan 1-0, R Fallon 0-2, Michael Griffin 0-2, S O'Connor 0-1, P McAvinue 0-1, P Fleury 0-1, G Keogh 0-1, S O'Connor 0-1.	Referee: B Gavin (Offaly)

26 June 2002 Semi-final	Wexford	3-17 - 2-07	Offaly	Dr. Cullen Park, Carlow
	R Flynn 2-7, M Kelly 1-3, G O'Grady 0-4, B Mulligan 0-1, P White 0-1, J O'Loughlin 0-1.		D Hayden 1-2, S Delaney 1-0, E Franks 0-3, M Dwane 0-1, T Bennett 0-1.	Referee: D Donovan (Dublin)

Final

7 July 2002 Final	Kilkenny	2-15 - 2-8	Wexford	Croke Park, Dublin
	W O'Dwyer 2-1, R Power 0-6 (0-5 frees), J Fitzpatrick 0-3, M Rice 0-2, S Coonan 0-2, A Healy 0-1.	Report	R Flynn 0-5 (0-5 frees), P Doran, D Foran 1-0 each, R Frayne, P White, M Kelly 0-1 each.	Referee: F Smith (Meath)

=== Munster Minor Hurling Championship ===
Quarter-finals

24 April 2002 Quarter-final	Waterford	0-12 - 0-12	Cork	Walsh Park, Waterford
	K Stafford 0-4, P Kearney 0-4, B Landers 0-2, S Kavanagh 0-1, J Quirke 0-1.		M Naughton 0-3, B Barry 0-3, R Butler 0-3, B Ring 0-1, S O'Sullivan 0-1, G O'Loughlin 0-1.	Referee: J McDonnell (Tipperary)

24 April 2002 Quarter-final	Kerry	0-06 - 5-20	Tipperary	Austin Stack Park, Tralee
	T Fealey 0-3, I McCarthy 0-1, J Egan 0-1, M Ó Cróinín 0-1.		P Shortt 3-7, T Ivors 2-1, C O'Mahoney 0-4, W Cully 0-2, D Morrissey 0-2, T Scroppe 0-2, N Kelly 0-1, P Ryan 0-1.	Referee: J O'Mara

1 May 2002 Quarter-final replay	Cork	1-09 - 1-08	Waterford	Páirc Uí Chaoimh, Cork
	G O'Loughlin 1-0, M Naughton 0-2, B Ring 0-2, B Barry 0-2, B Smiddy 0-1, M O'Sullivan 0-1, K Hartnett 0-1.		M Barden 1-1, J Heneghan 0-3, D Clifford 0-1, S Kavanagh 0-1, P Kearney 0-1, K Stafford 0-1.	Referee: D Richardson (Limerick)

Semi-finals

8 May 2002 Semi-final	Limerick	1-12 - 1-13	Tipperary	FitzGerald Park, Kilmallock
	P Kirby 0-9, B Hanley 1-0, J Quane 0-1, P Russell 0-1, A O'Shaughnessy 0-1.		P Shortt 1-6, F Devanney 0-2, D Corcoran 0-1, T Scoope 0-1, T Ivors 0-1, D Morrissey 0-1, W Ryan 0-1.	Referee: JM Kelly (Waterford)

8 May 2002 Semi-final	Cork	3-13 - 3-04	Clare	Semple Stadium, Thurles
	R Butler 2-3, M Naughton 1-4, S O’Sullivan 0-2, B Smiddy 0-1, B Barry 0-1, M O'Sullivan 0-1, B Ring 0-1.		E Torrey 1-0, K Neylon 1-0, C Crowe 1-0, P Collins 0-2, N Daly 0-1, J Molloy 0-1.	Referee: P Moore (Waterford)

Final

30 June 2002 Final	Cork	2-07 - 3-07	Tipperary	Páirc Uí Chaoimh, Cork
	M Naughton 1-4 (4f), B Barry 1-1 (1f), R Butler 0-1, B Smiddy 0-1.	Report	G Ivors 2-3, S Devanney 1-0, D Morrissey 0-1, P Shortt 0-1 (f), G Scoope 0-1, C O'Mahony 0-1 (65).	Referee: JM Kelly (Waterford)

=== Ulster Minor Hurling Championship ===
Semi-final

25 May 2002 Semi-final	Derry	3-16 - 0-04	Down	Casement Park, Belfast
	C Quinn 1-3, R Convery 0-6, D Grogan 0-3, B McGoldrick 0-2, D Cleary 0-1, N Magill 0-1.		D Coffey 0-3, B McGourty 0-1.	Referee: S Quinn (Tyrone)

Final

9 June 2002 Final	Antrim	1-11 - 0-04	Derry	Casement Park, Belfast
	J Scullion (0-8), S McAreavey (1-1), S Quinn (0-2).		R Convery (0-2), B McGoldrick (0-1), A Rafferty (0-1).	Referee: S Quinn (Tyrone)

=== All-Ireland Minor Hurling Championship ===
Quarter-finals

27 July 2002 Quarter-final	Wexford	3-10 - 2-10	Antrim	Parnell Park, Dublin
	R Flynn 2-1, P White 0-6, D Foran 1-0, G O’Grady 0-2, J Codd 0-1.		J Scullion 0-5, B Delargy 1-0, D Quinn 1-0, S McAreavy 0-3, D McKernan 0-2.	Referee: M Bodkin (Galway)

28 July 2002 Quarter-final	Galway	2-10 - 2-6	Cork	Croke Park, Dublin
	K Burke 1-2, A Callanan 1-1, C Dervan 0-4, I Tannion 0-2, N Callanan 0-1.		G O’Loughlin 2-0, M Naughton 0-3, K Hartnett 0-1, S O’Sullivan 0-1, B Barry 0-1.	Referee: E Morris (Dublin)

Semi-finals

11 August 2002 Semi-final	Tipperary	4-13 - 0-13	Wexford	Croke Park, Dublin
	W Ryan 1-5 (0-2f), T Ivors 2-1, P Shortt 1-3, W Cully 0-2, D Morrissey, E Sweeney 0-1 each.	Report	R Flynn 0-10 (9f), R Frayne, D Foran, G O'Grady 0-1 each.	Referee: P Dunphy (Kilkenny)

18 August 2002 Semi-final	Kilkenny	2-13 - 2-11	Galway	Croke Park, Dublin
	R Power 1-5; J Fitzpatrick 0-4; E Reid 1-0; PJ Delaney, M Rice, S Coonan and W O'Dwyer 0-1 each.	Report	K Burke 2-5; C Dervan 0-3 frees; J Gantley 0-2; I Tannian 0-1.	Referee: J Sexton (Limerick)

Final

8 September 2002 Final	Kilkenny	3-15 - 1-7	Tipperary	Croke Park, Dublin
	J Fitzpatrick (2-2); R Power (0-7, frees); E Reid (1-1); S Coonan (0-2); A Healy (0-2); W O'Dwyer (0-1).	Report	D Morrissey (1-0); W Ryan (0-4); F Devanney (0-2); T Scroope (0-1).	Referee: D Kirwan (Cork)

== Championship statistics ==
=== Top scorers ===
Top scorers overall

Rank	Player	Club	Tally	Total	Matches	Average
1	Richard Flynn	Wexford	4-23	35	4	8.75
2	Pat Shortt	Tipperary	5-17	32	5	6.40
3	Richie Power	Kilkenny	1-24	27	4	6.75
4	Trevor Ivors	Tipperary	6-06	24	5	4.80
5	Michael Naughton	Cork	2-16	22	5	4.40
5	Karl English	Carlow	1-19	22	3	7.33
7	James Fitzpatrick	Kilkenny	2-14	20	4	5.00
7	Michael Griffin	Dublin	1-17	20	5	4.00
9	Michael Ralph	Carlow	4-07	19	4	4.75
10	Paul Kehoe	Carlow	2-12	18	4	4.50

Top scorers in a single game

Rank	Player	Club	Tally	Total	Opposition
1	Pat Shortt	Tipperary	3-07	16	Kerry
2	Paul Kehoe	Carlow	2-09	15	Wicklow
3	Michael Ralph	Carlow	4-02	14	Wicklow
4	Richard Flynn	Wexford	2-07	13	Carlow
5	Kenneth Burke	Galway	2-05	11	Kilkenny
5	Stephen Clynch	Meath	1-08	11	Westmeath
7	Richard Flynn	Wexford	0-10	10	Tipperary
8	Richard Butler	Cork	2-03	9	Clare
8	Trevor Ivors	Tipperary	2-03	9	Cork
8	Pat Shortt	Tipperary	1-06	9	Limerick
8	Michael Dwane	Offaly	1-06	9	Westmeath
8	Pat Kirby	Limerick	0-09	9	Tipperary

=== Miscellaneous ===
- On 13 April 2002, Carlow defeated Laois in the Leinster Championship for the first time since 1956.
- Carlow's score of 7-21 against Wicklow was their highest ever points tally in the history of the Leinster Championship.
