= 1982 Kilkenny Intermediate Hurling Championship =

- Champions: Clara (1st title); E. Byrne (captain)
- Runners-up: Carrickshock; R. Power (captain)

The 1982 Kilkenny Intermediate Hurling Championship was the 18th staging of the Kilkenny Intermediate Hurling Championship since its establishment by the Kilkenny County Board in 1929.

The final was played on 10 October 1982 at Nowlan Park in Kilkenny, between Clara and Carrickshock, in what was their first ever meeting in the final. Carrickshock won the match by 0–13 to 0–09 to claim their first ever championship title.

== Results ==
=== Final ===
10 October 1982 Final	Clara	0-13 - 0-09	Carrickshock	Nowlan Park
	H Ryan 0-8, J Prendergast 0-2, S Whearty 0-2, L Ryan 0-1.		B Raggett 0-5, D Burke 0-2, M Power 0-1, N Maher 0-1.
