= 2003 Croke Cup =

Irish hurling competition

- Dates: 6–26 April 2003
- Teams: 3
- Champions: St Kieran's College (15th title); James "Cha" Fitzpatrick (captain)
- Runners-up: St Colman's College; Andrew O'Shaughnessy (captain)

Tournament statistics
- Matches played: 2
- Goals scored: 4 (2 per match)
- Points scored: 43 (21.5 per match)
- Top scorer(s): James "Cha" Fitzpatrick (0-10)

The 2003 Croke Cup was the 52nd staging of the Croke Cup since its establishment by the Gaelic Athletic Association in 1944. The competition ran from 6 April to 26 April 2003.

St Colman's College were the defending champions.

The final was played on 26 April 2003 at Clonmel Sportsground, between St Kieran's College and St Colman's College, in what was their sixth meeting in the final overall and a second successive meeting. St Kieran's College won the match by 1–15 to 1–04 to claim their 15th Croke Cup title overall and a first title in three years.

James "Cha" Fitzpatrick was the top scorer with 0–10.

== Qualification ==
Province	Champions
Connacht	Gort Community School
Leinster	St Kieran's College
Munster	St Colman's College

== Results ==
=== Semi-final ===
6 April 2003 Semi-final	St Kieran's College	2-20 - 0-04	Gort Community School	Boherlahen Grounds
	J Fitzpatrick 0-6, E O'Gorman 1-2, M Bergin 1-1, R Power 0-3, M Nolan 0-3, J Murphy 0-2, D O'Neill 0-1, E Reid 0-1, J Quane 0-1.		D Kennedy 0-3, K Diviney 0-1.	Referee: S Roche (Tipperary)

=== Final ===
26 April 2004 Final	St Kieran's College	1-15 - 1-04	St Colman's College	Clonmel Sportsground
	R Power (0-3 frees), J Fitzpatrick (0-2 frees) 0-4 each; E Reid 1-0; D O'Neill, M Bergin 0-2 each; E O'Gorman, J Murphy, M Nolan 0-1 each.	Report	D Fitzgerald 1-0 (free); A O'Shaughnessy 0-2; P Kirby, P Kearney 0-1 each.	Referee: S McMahon (Clare)
