= Richie Power Jnr =

Irish hurler (born 1985)

Richie Power
Personal information
- Native name: Risteard de Paor (Irish)
- Born: 4 December 1985 (age 40) Carrickshock, County Kilkenny, Ireland
- Occupation: Sales rep
- Height: 6 ft 0 in (183 cm)

Sport
- Sport: Hurling
- Position: Full-forward
Club*
| Years | Club | Apps (scores) |
| 2002–2017 | Carrickshock | 28 (3–152) |
Inter-county**
| Years | County | Apps (scores) |
| 2005–2016 | Kilkenny | 42 (14–81) |
Inter-county titles
- Leinster titles: 9
- All-Irelands: 8
- NHL: 6
- All Stars: 2
- * club appearances and scores correct as of 17:15, 17 January 2021. **Inter County team apps and scores correct as of 22:01, 7 September 2015.

Richard "Richie" Power (born 4 December 1985) is an Irish hurler who played as a centre-forward at senior level for the Kilkenny county team.

Born in Carrickshock, County Kilkenny, Power first played competitive hurling during his schooling at St Kieran's College. He arrived on the inter-county scene at the age of fifteen when he first linked up with the Kilkenny minor team, before later joining the under-21 side. He made his senior debut during the 2005 league. Power immediately became a regular member of the starting fifteen and has won eight All-Ireland medals, five Leinster medals and three National League medals. He has been an All-Ireland runner-up on one occasion.

As a member of the Leinster inter-provincial team on a number of occasions, Power has won two Railway Cup medals. At club level he is a one-time Leinster medallist with Carrickshock in the intermediate grade. In addition to this he has also won one championship medal in the same grade.

Power's father, Richie Power Snr, and his brother, John, have also enjoyed All-Ireland success with Kilkenny.

== Playing career ==
=== Club ===
Power played his club hurling with Carrickshock.

At underage levels he has won back-to-back minor county championship as well as a county under-21B championship.

In 2004 Power won a county intermediate championship medal with Carrickshock following a narrow 0–14 to 1–10 defeat of Mooncoin. He later won a Leinster intermediate winners' medal as Carrickshock defeated St Patrick's of Wexford by 2–16 to 0–7 in the inaugural provincial decider. Power's side were subsequently defeated by Kildangan in the All-Ireland Intermediate Club Hurling Championship decider.

=== Minor and under-21 ===
Power first played for Kilkenny at the turn of the century when he joined the minor side. He won his first Leinster medal as an unused substitute in 2001 following a 3–16 to 1–9 trouncing of Wexford.

By 2002 Power was a regular member of the starting fifteen. A 2–15 to 2–8 defeat of Wexford once again gave Power his first Leinster medal on the field of play. Kilkenny subsequently faced Tipperary in the All-Ireland decider. A tour de force by "the Cats" gave them a huge 3–15 to 1–7 victory and gave Power his first All-Ireland medal.

Power was captain of the Kilkenny minor team in 2003. He won his third successive Leinster medal that year, his second on the field of play, following an 0–18 to 0–13 defeat of Offaly. Kilkenny subsequently faced Galway in the All-Ireland decider. Power gave a masterclass of hurling, including scoring the winning point deep into injury time, to secure a 2–16 to 2–15 victory. It was his second All-Ireland medal while he also had the honour of lifting the cup.

In 2003 Power was also added to the Kilkenny under-21 panel. He won a Leinster medal that year as an unused substitute following a 0–12 to 1–4 defeat of Dublin.

The following year Power was a key member of the starting fifteen with the under-21 hurlers. He won his first Leinster medal on the field of play that year following a 0–16 to 2–3 defeat of Wexford. The subsequent All-Ireland decider saw Kilkenny dominate Tipperary. A 3–21 to 1–6 trouncing gave Power his first All-Ireland medal.

Power added a second Leinster medal to his collection in 2005, following a 0–17 to 1–10 defeat of Dublin. Kilkenny's bid for a third successive All-Ireland title ended in dramatic fashion as a late point from Kerril Wade handed Galway a narrow 1–15 to 1–14 victory.

For the fourth successive year Power won a Leinster medal, his third on the field of play, following a 2–18 to 2–10 defeat of Dublin before later lining out in the All-Ireland decider against Tipperary. A last second opportunist goal by Richie Hogan saved Kilkenny and secured a 2–14 apiece draw. The replay was another close encounter, however, Paddy Hogan's first half goal helped Kilkenny claw their way to the title following a 1–11 to 0–11 defeat of Tipperary. It was Power's second All-Ireland medal.

=== Senior ===
==== Beginnings ====
Power was still a member of the under-21 team when he was added to the Kilkenny senior panel in 2005. Kilkenny were back in form that year, with Power winning a first National Hurling League medal following a huge 3–20 to 0–15 victory over Clare. On 12 June 2005 Power made his championship debut in a 6–28 to 0–15 Leinster semi-final trouncing of Offaly. "The Cats" later struggled against a wasteful Wexford side, however, a 0–22 to 1–16 victory gave Power a first Leinster medal. While a third successive All-Ireland showdown with Cork seemed likely, Galway defeated Kilkenny in the All-Ireland semi-final in one of the games of the decade.

==== Four-in-a-row ====
In 2006 Power added a second league medal to his collection following a 3–11 to 0–14 victory over Limerick. He later won his second Leinster medal following another facile 1–23 to 1–12 victory over Wexford. On 3 September 2006 Kilkenny faced a Cork team who were presented with the opportunity to become the first side in nearly thirty years to secure three successive All-Ireland championships. Like previous encounters neither side took a considerable lead, however, Kilkenny had a vital goal from Aidan Fogarty. Cork were in arrears coming into the final few minutes, however, Ben O'Connor scored a late goal for Cork. It was too little too late as the Cats denied Cork on a score line of 1–16 to 1–13. It was a first All-Ireland medal for Power..

Power missed Kilkenny's successful provincial campaign in 2007 due to a hamstring injury, however, he returned for the All-Ireland series of games. On 2 September 2007 Kilkenny faced defeated Munster finalists and surprise All-Ireland semi-final winners Limerick in the championship decider. Kilkenny got off to a flying start with Eddie Brennan and Henry Shefflin scoring two goals within the first ten minutes to set the tone. Limerick launched a second-half comeback, however, "the Cats" were too powerful and cruised to a 2–19 to 1–15 victory. It was Power's second All-Ireland medal.

Kilkenny secured the Leinster crown again in 2008, with Power collecting a third winners' medal following a 5–21 to 0–17 drubbing of Wexford. On 8 September 2008 Kilkenny faced Waterford in the All-Ireland decider for the first time in forty-five years. In a disappointingly one-sided final, Kilkenny produced a near perfect seventy minutes as Waterford endured a nightmare afternoon. A 23-point winning margin, 3–24 from play, only two wides in the entire match and eight scorers in all with Eddie Brennan and Henry Shefflin leading the way in a 3–30 to 1–13 victory. It was Power's third All-Ireland medal.

Power won a fourth Leinster medal in 2009 as new challengers Dublin were bested by 2–18 to 0–18. On 6 September Kilkenny were poised to become the second team ever in the history of hurling to win four successive All-Ireland championships when they faced Tipperary in the decider. For long periods Tipp looked the likely winners, however, late goals from Henry Shefflin and substitute Martin Comerford finally killed off their efforts to secure a 2–22 to 0–23 victory. Larkin had collected his fourth All-Ireland medal.

==== Continued dominance ====
In 2010 Kilkenny defeated Galway in an eagerly-anticipated but ultimately disappointing provincial decider. A 1–19 to 1–12 victory gave Power a fifth Leinster medal. The drive for an unprecedented fifth successive All-Ireland crown reached a head on 5 September 2010, when Kilkenny faced Tipperary in the All-Ireland decider. "The Cats" lost talisman Henry Shefflin due to injury, while Tipperary's Lar Corbett ran riot and scored a hat-trick of goals as Power's side fell to a 4–17 to 1–18 defeat.

Kilkenny's stranglehold in Leinster continued in 2011. A 4–17 to 1–15 defeat of Dublin gave Power a sixth provincial medal. Kilkenny subsequently faced Tipperary in the All-Ireland decider on 4 September 2011. Goals by Michael Fennelly and Richie Hogan in either half gave Kilkenny, who many viewed as the underdogs going into the game, a 2–17 to 1–16 victory. Power collected a fifth All-Ireland medal, while he later collected a first All-Star award.

In 2012 Kilkenny were shocked by Galway in the Leinster decider, losing by 2–21 to 2–11, however, both sides subsequently met in the All-Ireland decider on 9 September 2012. Kilkenny had led going into the final stretch, however, Joe Canning struck a stoppage time equaliser to level the game at 2–13 to 0–19 and send the final to a replay for the first time since 1959. The replay took place three weeks later on 30 September 2012. Galway stunned the reigning champions with two first-half goals, however, Kilkenny's championship debutant Walter Walsh gave a man of the match performance, claiming a 1–3 haul. The 3–22 to 3–11 Kilkenny victory gave Power a sixth All-Ireland medal. He later won a second All-Star.

Power collected his third league medal in 2014, as Kilkenny secured a narrow one-point 2–25 to 1–27 extra-time victory over Tipperary. He subsequently secured a seventh Leinster medal, as a dominant Kilkenny display gave "the Cats" a 0–14 to 1–9 defeat of Dublin. On 7 September 2014 Kilkenny faced Tipperary in the All-Ireland decider. In what some consider to be the greatest game of all time, the sides were level when Tipperary were awarded a controversial free. John O'Dwyer had the chance to win the game, however, his late free drifted wide resulting in a draw. The replay on 27 September 2014 was also a close affair. Goals from Power and his brother John inspired Kilkenny to a 2–17 to 2–14 victory. It was Power's seventh All-Ireland medal.

A recurring knee ligament injury limited Power to club activity for most of 2015. After missing the league and championship campaigns he was listed as a substitute when Kilkenny faced Galway in the All-Ireland decider on 6 September 2015. The team struggled in the first half, however, a T. J. Reid goal and a dominant second half display, which limited Galway to just 1–4, saw Kilkenny power to a 1–22 to 1–18 victory. Power was introduced as a substitute for Richie Hogan and collected his eighth All-Ireland medal on the field of play.

In January 2016, Power announced his retirement from inter-county hurling.

== Career statistics ==
| Team | Year | National League | | | Leinster | | All-Ireland | | Total | |
| Team | Year | Division | Apps | Score | Apps | Score | Apps | Score | Apps | Score |
|---|---|---|---|---|---|---|---|---|---|---|
| Kilkenny | 2005 | Division 1A | 6 | 1-08 | 2 | 1-04 | 2 | 0-02 | 10 | 2-14 |
| Kilkenny | 2006 | Division 1B | 6 | 0-26 | 1 | 0-03 | 2 | 0-02 | 9 | 0-31 |
| Kilkenny | 2007 | Division 1B | 6 | 0-35 | 0 | 0-00 | 3 | 1-06 | 9 | 1-41 |
| Kilkenny | 2008 | Division 1A | 3 | 0-16 | 1 | 1-02 | 2 | 0-03 | 6 | 1-21 |
| Kilkenny | 2009 | Division 1 | 6 | 5-26 | 2 | 1-00 | 2 | 0-02 | 10 | 6-28 |
| Kilkenny | 2010 | Division 1 | 4 | 2-29 | 2 | 1-03 | 2 | 2-17 | 8 | 5-49 |
| Kilkenny | 2011 | Division 1 | 0 | 0-00 | 2 | 0-05 | 2 | 0-02 | 4 | 0-07 |
| Kilkenny | 2012 | Division 1A | 5 | 3-49 | 2 | 1-05 | 4 | 1-08 | 11 | 5-62 |
| Kilkenny | 2013 | Division 1A | 6 | 0-21 | 3 | 0-07 | 3 | 1-09 | 12 | 1-37 |
| Kilkenny | 2014 | Division 1A | 5 | 0-09 | 0 | 0-00 | 3 | 4-02 | 8 | 4-11 |
| Kilkenny | 2015 | Division 1A | 0 | 0-00 | 0 | 0-00 | 1 | 0-00 | 1 | 0-00 |
| Total | | | 47 | 11-219 | 15 | 5-29 | 26 | 9-53 | 88 | 25-301 |

== Honours ==
=== Team ===
St Kieran's College

- All-Ireland Colleges' Senior Hurling Championship (2): 2003, 2004
- Leinster Colleges' Senior Hurling Championship (3): 2002, 2003, 2004

Carrickshock

- All-Ireland Intermediate Club Hurling Championship (1): 2017
- Leinster Intermediate Club Hurling Championship (2): 2004, 2016
- Kilkenny Intermediate Club Hurling Championship (2): 2004, 2016
- Kilkenny Senior Hurling League (1): 2012
- Kilkenny Under-21 B Club Hurling Championship (1): 2000
- Kilkenny Minor Club Hurling Championship (2): 2001, 2002

Kilkenny

- All-Ireland Senior Hurling Championship (8): 2006, 2007, 2008, 2009, 2011, 2012, 2014, 2015
- Leinster Senior Hurling Championship (9): 2005, 2006, 2007, 2008, 2009, 2010, 2011, 2014, 2015
- National Hurling League (6): 2005, 2006, 2009, 2011, 2012, 2014
- All-Ireland Under-21 Hurling Championship (2): 2004, 2006
- Leinster Under-21 Hurling Championship (3): 2004, 2005, 2006
- All-Ireland Minor Hurling Championship (2): 2002, 2003
- All-Ireland Minor Hurling Championship (2): 2002, 2003

Leinster

- Interprovincial Championship (2): 2008, 2012

=== Individual ===
- All-Stars (2): 2010, 2011

Sporting positions
| Preceded by Michael Rice | Kilkenny Minor Hurling Captain; 2003 | Succeeded by Matthew Ruth |
Achievements
| Preceded by Michael Rice (Kilkenny) | All-Ireland MHC winning captain 2003 | Succeeded by John Lee (Galway) |
