= Kerril Wade =

Irish hurler

Personal information
- Native name: Coireall Mac Uaid (Irish)
- Born: June 1986 (age 40) New Inn, County Galway, Ireland

Sport
- Sport: Hurling
- Position: Left corner-forward
Club
- Years: Club
- Sarsfields
Club titles
- Galway titles: 1
Inter-county
- Years: County
- 2007-2013: Galway
Inter-county titles
- Leinster titles: 0
- All-Irelands: 0
- NHL: 0
- All Stars: 0

Kerril Wade (born June 1986) is an Irish hurler who plays for Galway Senior Championship club Sarsfields. He is a former member of the Galway senior hurling team, having lined out as a corner-forward.

== Career ==
Wade first came to prominence on the inter-county scene as a member of the Galway minor team that beat Kilkenny to win the 2004 All-Ireland Minor Championship. He was immediately drafted onto the Galway under-21 team and won two All-Ireland Under-21 Championship titles in three seasons between 2005 and 2007. He subsequently joined the Galway senior hurling team and made a number of appearances but ultimately ended his senior career without silverware. Wade played his club hurling with Sarsfields and won a County Championship title in 2015.

== Honours ==
Sarsfields

- Galway Senior Hurling Championship: 2015
- All-Ireland Junior B Club Hurling Championship: 2023
- Leinster Junior B Club Hurling Championship: 2023

Galway

- All-Ireland Under-21 Hurling Championship: 2005, 2007
- All-Ireland Minor Hurling Championship: 2004
