= Paddy Hogan =

Irish hurler

Personal information
- Native name: Páidí Ó hÓgáin (Irish)
- Born: 9 May 1987 (age 39) Danesfort, County Kilkenny, Ireland
- Occupation: Primary school teacher
- Height: 6 ft 0 in (183 cm)

Sport
- Sport: Hurling
- Position: Left wing-back
Club
- Years: Club
- 2005-present: Danesfort
Club titles
- Kilkenny titles: 0
Inter-county*
Years	County	Apps (scores)
2009-present	Kilkenny	1 (0-00)
Inter-county titles
- Leinster titles: 2
- All-Irelands: 1
- NHL: 1
- All Stars: 0
- *Inter County team apps and scores correct as of 17:40, 14 June 2011.

Paddy Hogan (born 9 May 1987) is an Irish sportsperson. He plays hurling with his local club Danesfort and has been a member of the Kilkenny senior inter-county team since 2009.
