= 2005 National Hurling League =

74th season of the National Hurling League

League details
- Dates: 20 February – 7 May 2005
- Teams: 32

League champions
- Winners: Kilkenny (12th win)
- Captain: Peter Barry
- Manager: Brian Cody

League runners-up
- Runners-up: Clare
- Captain: Seánie McMahon
- Manager: Anthony Daly

Other division winners
- Division 2: Offaly
- Division 3: Mayo
- Division 3 Shield: Longford

The 2005 National Hurling League, known for sponsorship reasons as the Allianz National Hurling League, was the 74th edition of the National Hurling League (NHL), an annual hurling competition for the GAA county teams. Kilkenny won the league, beating Clare in the final.

An experimental rule was trialled in the 2005 NHL, with two points being awarded for a point scored directly from a sideline cut.

== Structure ==
=== Division 1 ===
There are 12 teams in Division 1, divided into 1A and 1B. Each team plays all the others in its group once, earning 2 points for a win and 1 for a draw.

- The top three in 1A and 1B advance to Division 1 Section 1.
- The bottom three in 1A and 1B go into the Division 1 Section 2.

Each team in Section 1 plays the other three teams that it did not play in the first five games. The top two teams go into the NHL final – only points earned in these last three games count. Each team in Section 2 plays the other three teams that it did not play in the first five games. The bottom team is relegated – only points earned in these last three games count.

=== Division 2 ===
There are 10 teams in Division 2, divided into 2A and 2B. Each team plays all the others in its group once, earning 2 points for a win and 1 for a draw.

- The top three in 2A and 2B advance to the Division 2 Section 1.
- The bottom two in 2A and 2B go into the Division 2 Section 2.

Each team in Section 1 plays the other three teams that it did not play in the first four games. The top two teams go into the Division 2 final – only points earned in these last three games count. Final winners are promoted. Each team in Section 2 plays the other two teams that it did not play in the first four games. The bottom team is relegated – only points earned in these last two games count.

=== Division 3 ===
There are 10 teams in Division 3, divided into 3A and 3B. Each team plays all the others in its group once, earning 2 points for a win and 1 for a draw.

- The top three in 3A and 3B advance to the Division 3 Section 1.
- The bottom two in 3A and 3B go into the Division 3 Section 2.

Each team in Section 1 plays the other three teams that it did not play in the first four games. The top two teams go into the Division 3 final – only points earned in these last three games count. Final winners are promoted. Each team in Section 2 plays the other two teams that it did not play in the first four games. The top two play the Division 3 Shield Final.

== Overview ==
=== Division 1 ===
Brian Cody won his third league title in four seasons with Kilkenny, as 'the Cats' recorded just a single defeat in the entire league. Clare, who were league runners-up, also suffered just one defeat in the group stages, however, they fell to Kilkenny in the final.

Down at the other end of the table, Dublin and Down went through the group stages without a single victory. A relegation group of six teams meant that 'the Dubs' ended up at the bottom and faced relegation for the following season.

=== Division 2 ===
Offaly won the Division 2 title after recording just one defeat throughout the group stages, thus returning to the top flight having been relegated the previous year. Runners-up Carlow also faced only one defeat throughout the group stages until the last day of the league when they were defeated in the final by Offaly. Going down were Sligo who only had a draw with Wicklow to show for their entire campaign.

=== Division 3 ===
Mayo and Donegal qualified for the league final in this division with Mayo winning promotion. Cavan, having failed to win a single game in the group stage, finished bottom of Division 3B and could thus be regarded as the worst team of all the divisions.

== Division 1 ==
National Hurling League Division 1
- Season: 2005
- Champions: Kilkenny; 12th National League title Captain: Pater Barry; Manager: Brian Cody
- Relegated: Dublin
- Matches played: 49
- Top goalscorer: Ger Farragher (2-54)
- Biggest home win: Wexford 9-24 - 2-4 Down (26 March 2005)
- Biggest away win: Tipperary 6-21 - 0-10 Antrim (20 March 2005)
- Highest scoring: Wexford 9-24 - 2-4 Down (26 March 2005)
- All statistics correct as of 2 January 2017.

Galway came into the season as defending champions of the 2004 season. Down entered Division 1 as the promoted team.

On 2 May 2005, Kilkenny won the title following a 3-20 to 0-15 win over Clare in the final. It was their first league title since 2003 and their 12th National League title overall.

Dublin, who lost all of their group stage matches, were relegated from Division 1 after losing all of their matches in the relegation group. Offaly won Division 2 and secured promotion to the top tier.

Galway's Ger Farragher was the Division 1 top scorer with 2-54.

=== Division 1A table ===
Advance to Group 1

Advance to Group 2

Pos	Team	Pld	W	D	L	Pts
1	Kilkenny	5	4	0	1	8
2	Galway	5	4	0	1	8
3	Clare	5	4	0	1	8
4	Waterford	5	2	0	3	4
5	Laois	5	1	0	4	2
6	Dublin	5	0	0	5	0

=== Group stage ===
19 February 2005 Round 1	Clare	1-16 - 2-11	Laois	Cusack Park, Ennis
	T Carmody 0-5, S McMahon 0-4, D O’Connell 1-0, D O’Rourke 0-3, F Lohan 0-1, C Plunkett 0-1, C Lynch 0-1, T Kearse 0-1.	Report	C Coonan 0-4, P Mullaney 1-0, C Brophy 1-0, J Walsh 0-2, R Jones 0-2, J Fitzpatrick 0-1, D Walsh 0-1, P Russell 0-1.	Referee: J McDonnell (Tipperary)

20 February 2005 Round 1	Galway	3-19 - 0-12	Dublin	Pearse Stadium, Galway
	F Healy 0-6, David Hayes 1-2, K Broderick 1-2, G Farragher 0-4, D Forde 1-0, A Smyth 0-2, D Collins 0-1, A Cullinane 0-1, K Hayes 0-1.		S Mullen 0-7, E Moran 0-2, E Carroll 0-2, J Kingston 0-1,	Referee: P O'Connor (Limerick)

20 February 2005 Round 1	Waterford	0-17 - 2-16	Kilkenny	Walsh Park, Waterford
	E Kelly 0-8, K McGrath 0-4, M Walsh 0-1, D Shanahan 0-1, P Flynn 0-1, J Mullane 0-1, S Prendergast 0-1.		R Power 0-6, J Hoyne 1-1, D Lyng 1-1, B Barry 0-2, W O’Dwyer 0-2, M Comerford 0-2, E Brennan 0-1, J Coogan 0-1.	Referee: S Roche (Tipperary)

26 February 2005 Round 2	Dublin	0-14 - 2-19	Clare	Parnell Park, Dublin
	D Curtin 0-9, E Carroll 0-2, K Elliott 0-1, S Hiney 0-1, G Bennett 0-1.	Report	T Carmody 1-6, T Griffin 0-5, N Gilligan 0-4, D McMahon 1-0, C Lynch 0-2, G Quinn 0-1, A Quinn 0-1.

27 February 2005 Round 2	Kilkenny	4-16 - 1-21	Galway	Nowlan Park, Kilkenny
	H Shefflin 1-7, J Hoyne 2-3, E Brennan 1-2, M Comerford 0-1, W O’Dwyer 0-1, R Power 0-1, M Kavanagh 0-1.		G Farragher 0-15, K Broderick 1-2, D Forde 0-2, K Hayes 0-1, N Healy 0-1.	Referee: G Harrintinton (Cork)

27 February 2005 Round 2	Laois	0-14 - 1-19	Waterford	O'Moore Park, Portlaoise
	J Young 0-7, P Russell 0-3, J Walsh 0-1, C Coonan 0-1, J Rowney 0-1, C Brophy 0-1.		J Mullane 1-4, E Kelly 0-7, D Bennett 0-3, B Phelan 0-2, D Shanahan 0-1, S Prendergast 0-1, B Wall 0-1.

13 March 2005 Round 3	Waterford	2-24 - 0-13	Dublin	Walsh Park, Waterford
	E Kelly 1-5, P O’Brien 1-5, M Walsh 0-4, D Bennett 0-3, J Mullane 0-3, P Flynn 0-2, D Shanahan 0-1, T Browne 0-1.		D Curtin 0-7, C Meehan 0-2, F Chambers 0-2, E Carroll 0-1, J Kingston 0-1.	Referee: G Harrington (Cork)

13 March 2005 Round 3	Clare	1-13 - 3-11	Galway	Cusack Park, Ennis
	N Gilligan 0-10, D O’Connell 1-0, D McMahon 0-2, G Quinn 0-1.		Damien Hayes 2-4, G Farragher 1-3, D Forde 0-2, F Healy 0-2.

13 March 2005 Round 3	Laois	1-9 - 0-19	Kilkenny	O'Moore Park, Portlaoise
	J Young 0-7, M Rooney 1-0, J Rooney 0-1, E Jackman 0-1.		J Coogan 0-4, DJ Carey 0-4, J Maher 0-3, D Lyng 0-3, J Hoyne 0-2, J Maher 0-2, W O’Dwyer 0-1, B Barry 0-1.	Referee: J Sexton (Limerick)

19 March 2005 Round 4	Dublin	1-10 - 2-13	Laois	Parnell Park, Dublin
	D Curtin (0-7; four frees, one 65), E Carroll (1-1), M Breathnach (0-2).		J Young (0-5, three frees, one 65), L Tynan (1-1), R Jones (1-1), E Jackman (0-2), J Rowney (0-2), M Rooney (0-1), C Brophy (0-1).

20 March 2005 Round 4	Kilkenny	1-8 - 2-13	Clare	Nowlan Park, Kilkenny
	J Maher 1-0, J Coogan 0-3, DJ Carey 0-3, B Barry 0-1, J Fitzpatrick 0-1.		N Gilligan 0-12, T Carmody 1-0, A Quinn 1-0, C Lynch 0-1.	Referee: P O'Connor (Limerick)

20 March 2005 Round 4	Galway	0-18 - 0-11	Waterford	Pearse Stadium, Galway
	G Farragher 0-6, D Hayes 0-4, T Regan 0-3, D Tierney 0-2, K Broderick 0-2, D Hardiman 0-1.		E Kelly 0-3, D Bennett 0-3, P O’Brien 0-2, D Shanahan 0-1, J Mullane 0-1, P Flynn 0-1.	Referee: P Horan (Offaly)

26 March 2005 Round 5	Waterford	2-10 - 3-14	Clare	Fraher Field, Dungarvan
	P Flynn 2-6, E Kelly 0-3, J Mullane 0-1.		N Gilligan 1-4, T Griffin 1-2, S McMahon 0-4, D O’Connell 1-0, T Carmody 0-2, D McMahon 0-1, B Nugent 0-1.

27 March 2005 Round 5	Laois	2-13 - 2-17	Galway	O'Moore Park, Portlaoise
	J Young 0-11, M Rooney 1-0, D Culleton 1-0, C Coonan 0-1, J Phelan 0-1.		G Farragher 1-9, N Healy 1-0, Damien Hayes 0-3, R Murray 0-2, D Forde 0-1, A Callanan 0-1, K Hayes 0-1.	Referee: J McDonnell (Tipperary)

27 March 2005 Round 5	Dublin	0-11 - 2-27	Kilkenny	Parnell Park, Dublin
	D Curtin 0-5, E Carroll 0-3, M Breathnach 0-2, S Hiney 0-1.		E McCormack 2-3, E Larkin 0-8, M Comerford 0-6, T Walsh 0-4, D Lyng 0-3, B Barry 0-3.	Referee: B Kelly (Westmeath)

=== Division 1B table ===
Advance to Group 1

Advance to Group 2

Pos	Team	Pld	W	D	L	Pts
1	Cork	5	5	0	0	10
2	Wexford	5	4	0	1	8
3	Tipperary	5	3	0	2	6
4	Limerick	5	2	0	3	4
5	Antrim	5	1	0	4	2
6	Down	5	0	0	5	0

=== Group stage ===
20 February 2005 Round 1	Cork	1-20 - 0-10	Limerick	Páirc Uí Chaoimh, Cork
	N Ronan 0-7, B O’Connor 1-1, N McCarthy 0-3, J Deane 0-3, T McCarthy 0-2, J O’Connor 0-2, K Murphy 0-1, T Kenny 0-1.		M Keane 0-7, P Tobin 0-1, A O’Connor 0-1, P O'Dwyer 0-1.	Referee: S McMahon (Clare)

20 February 2005 Round 1	Tipperary	3-17 - 2-12	Down	Semple Stadium, Thurles
	E Sweeney 1-6, D Egan 1-1, M Webster 1-0, T Slevin 0-3, M O’Leary 0-2, F Devaney 0-2, S Butler 0-2, D Shelley 0-1.		E Clarke 2-0, S Wilson 0-4, M Coulter 0-3, S Clarke 0-2, B McGourty 0-1, G Johnston 0-1, J Clarke 0-1.	Referee: P Greene (Galway)

20 February 2005 Round 1	Antrim	1-9 - 2-12	Wexford	Fr. Healy Park, Loughguile
	M Herron 1-2, J McIntosh 0-3, B Quinn 0-1, C McGuckian 0-1, K McKeegan 0-1, C Herron 0-1.		P Carley 0-7, W Doran 1-1, M Furlong 1-0, D Mythen 0-2, E Barry 0-1, M Jordan 0-1.	Referee: E Morris (Dublin)

27 February 2005 Round 2	Wexford	0-15 - 1-13	Cork	Wexford Park, Wexford
	P Carley 0-9, R Barry 0-2, M Jordan 0-1, W Doran 0-1, D Stamp 0-1, D Mythen 0-1.		T McCarthy 1-2, G McCarthy 0-3, T Kenny 0-2, J Deane 0-2, N McCarthy 0-1, S Og O hAilpin 0-1, G Callinan 0-1, B Corcoran 0-1.	Referee: B Kelly (Westmeath)

27 February 2005 Round 2	Down	0-10 - 3-13	Antrim	St. Patrick's Park, Portaferry
	S Clarke 0-4, S Wilson 0-4, A Savage 0-1, B McGourty 0-1.		M Herron 1-5, J McIntosh 1-3, D Quinn 1-0, B Quinn 0-2, C Herron 0-1, B Herron 0-1, P Close 0-1.	Referee: G Devlin (Armagh)

27 February 2005 Round 2	Limerick	3-11 - 4-14	Tipperary	Gaelic Grounds, Limerick
	A O’Connor 0-6, P O’Grady 1-1, D Ryan 1-0, A O’Shaughnessy 1-0, J O’Brien 0-2, E Foley 0-1, D O’Grady 0-1.		E Sweeney 1-6, F Devanney 1-2, D Egan 1-1, M Webster 1-0, B Dunne 0-2, T Slevin 0-1, D Kennedy 0-1, D Shelly 0-1.	Referee: B Gavin (Offaly)

12 March 2005 Round 3	Cork	1-19 - 1-9	Antrim	Páirc Uí Rinn, Cork
	J Deane 1-7, G McCarthy 0-3, N McCarthy 0-2, B Corcoran 0-2, N Ronan 0-2, R McGregor 0-1, J Barrett 0-1, P Kelly 0-1.		J MacIntosh 1-4, B Quinn 0-2, K Stewart 0-1, G Cunningham 0-1, M McCambridge 0-1.	Referee: B Gavin (Offaly)

13 March 2005 Round 3	Limerick	4-25 - 1-9	Down	Gaelic Grounds, Limerick
	P Tobin 1-6, N Moran 0-6, A O’Connor 1-2, D Ryan 1-2, J O’Brien 1-1, S O’Connor 0-2, D O’Grady 0-1, M Cahill 0-1, M Foley 0-1, K O’Dwyer 0-1, D Sheehan 0-1, JP Sheehan 0-1.		J McCusker 1-0, G Johnson 0-3, S Wilson 0-3, A Savage 0-1, B McGourty 0-1, E Clarke 0-1.	Referee: P Greene (Galway)

13 March 2005 Round 3	Tipperary	2-15 - 2-19	Wexford	Semple Stadium, Thurles
	M O’Leary 1-2, E Sweeney 1-1, M Webster 0-3, P O’Brien 0-3, F Devanney 0-2, B Dunne 0-1, C Morrissey 0-1, T Slevin 0-1, T King 0-1.		P Carley 0-11, R Barry 1-3, N Higgins 1-0, M Jacob 0-3, D Mythen 0-2.	Referee: S McMahon (Clare)

20 March 2005 Round 4	Down	0-11 - 1-19	Cork	McKenna Park, Ballycran
	M Coulter 0-5, S Wilson 0-3, G Johnson 0-2, J McCusker 0-1.		N Ronan 0-11, B Corcoran 1-0, P Kelly 0-2, K Murphy 0-2, J Bowles 0-1, R McGregor 0-1, G McCarthy 0-1, J O’Callaghan 0-1.	Referee: G Devlin (Armagh)

20 March 2005 Round 4	Antrim	0-10 - 6-21	Tipperary	Casement Park, Belfast
	M Herron 0-3, P Richmond 0-2, J McIntosh 0-2, K McKeegan 0-2, C McGuckian 0-1.		E Kelly 2-8, P O’Brien 2-4, F Devenney 1-2, M Webster 1-1, J Devane 0-3, M O’Leary 0-3.	Referee: A Mac Suibhne (Dublin)

20 March 2005 Round 4	Wexford	3-10 - 0-17	Limerick	Wexford Park, Wexford
	N Higgins 2-2, P Carley 0-4, W Doran 1-0, M Jacob 0-2, M Jordan 0-1, D Mythen 0-1.		A O’Connor 0-8, N Moran 0-3, P O’Grady 0-3, D O’Grady 0-1, J O’Brien 0-1, O Moran 0-1.	Referee: B Gavin (Offaly)

26 March 2005 Round 5	Wexford	9-24 - 2-4	Down	Wexford Park, Wexford
	N Higgins 2-4, R Jacob 2-2, B Lambert 1-5, E Quigley 1-1, M Jordan 1-1, D Mythen 0-4, M Jacob 1-0, C McGrath 1-0, D Lyng 0-3, W Doran 0-2, MJ Furlong 0-1, D O’Brien 0-1.		M Coulter 1-3, G Johnson 1-0, S Wilson 0-1.	Referee: A Stapleton (Laois)

27 March 2005 Round 5	Limerick	3-21 - 2-12	Antrim	Gaelic Grounds, Limerick
	A O’Connor 1-6, Sean O’Connor 2-2, N Moran 0-4, K O’Dwyer, D O’Grady, P O’Grady 0-2 each, D Breen, A O’Shaughnessy, D Ryan 0-1 each.		K McKeegan, J McIntosh 1-1 each, M Herron 0-3, C Herron 0-2, A Scullion, B Fall, P Richmond, B Quinn, K Stewart 0-1 each.	Referee: J McGrath (Westmeath)

27 March 2005 Round 5	Tipperary	1-12 - 0-16	Cork	Semple Stadium, Thurles
	E Kelly 0-6, J Devane 1-2, B Dunne 0-1, T King 0-1, T Dunne 0-1, P O’Brien 0-1.		N Ronan 0-7, J Deane 0-4, T Kenny 0-2, G McCarthy 0-1, T McCarthy 0-1, B O’Connor 0-1.	Referee: A Mac Suibhne (Dublin)

=== Group 1 table ===
National Hurling League Final

Pos	Team	Pld	W	D	L	Pts
1	Kilkenny (C)	3	3	0	0	6
2	Clare	3	3	0	0	6
3	Galway	3	2	0	1	4
4	Tipperary	3	1	0	2	2
5	Wexford	3	0	0	3	0
6	Cork	3	0	0	3	0

=== Group 1 results ===
10 April 2005 Round 1	Tipperary	0-15 - 1-16	Clare	Semple Stadium, Thurles
	E Kelly 0-5, P O’Brien 0-3, J Devane 0-3, P Kelly 0-2, M O’Leary 0-1, D Egan 0-1.		A Quinn 1-2, S McMahon 0-5, N Gilligan 0-5, T Carmody 0-2, C Lynch 0-1, C Plunkett 0-1.	Referee: D Kirwan (Cork)

10 April 2005 Round 1	Cork	1-11 - 1-14	Kilkenny	Páirc Uí Chaoimh, Cork
	B O’Connor 0-9, J Deane 1-0, N McCarthy 0-1, N Ronan 0-1.		E Larkin 0-5, M Comerford 1-0, B Barry 0-3, DJ Carey 0-2, D Lyng 0-1, T Walsh 0-1, R Power 0-1, H Shefflin 0-1.	Referee: P O'Connor (Limerick)

10 April 2005 Round 1	Wexford	2-10 - 0-19	Galway	Wexford Park, Wexford
	P Carley 0-4, D Mythen 1-0, D Fitzhenry 1-0, R Jacob 0-2, N Higgins 0-2, M Jacob 0-1, E Quigley 0-1.		G Farragher 0-12, Damien Hayes 0-2, E Cloonan 0-2, D Forde 0-1, N Healy 0-1, D Collins 0-1.	Referee: G Harrington (Cork)

17 April 2005 Round 2	Galway	0-17 - 3-16	Tipperary	Pearse Stadium, Galway
	G Farragher 0-5, R Murray 0-4, D Collins 0-2, E Cloonan 0-2, D Forde 0-1, K Hayes 0-1, D Hayes 0-1, D Donoghue 0-1.		E Kelly 0-10, M O’Leary 2-0, M Webster 1-0, J Devane 0-2, T Dunne 0-1, B Dunne 0-1, F Devanney 0-1, P O’Brien 0-1.	Referee: D Murphy (Wexford)

17 April 2005 Round 2	Kilkenny	3-26 - 0-5	Wexford	Nowlan Park, Kilkenny
	E Larkin 0-8, B Barry 0-8, DJ Carey 1-3, H Shefflin 1-1, M Comerford 0-4, R Power 1-0, T Walsh 0-2.		E Quigley 0-1, D Ruth 0-1, M Jacob 0-1, N Higgins 0-1, C McGrath 0-1.	Referee: B Kelly (Westmeath)

17 April 2005 Round 2	Clare	2-15 - 3-9	Cork	Cusack Park, Ennis
	N Gilligan 1-4, A Quinn 1-1, B Nugent 0-3, S McMahon 0-3, T Carmody 0-3, D McMahon 0-1.		T Kenny 1-4, B O’Connor 1-1, G McCarthy 1-0, K Murphy 0-2, J O’Connor 0-1, J O’Callaghan 0-1.	Referee: S Roche (Tipperary)

24 April 2005 Round 3	Kilkenny	3-18 - 2-16	Tipperary	Nowlan Park, Kilkenny
	E Larkin 2-4, H Shefflin 1-6, J Ryall 0-3, M Comerford 0-3, B Barry 0-1, E McCormack 0-1.		E Kelly 0-9, L Corbett 1-1, F Devanney 1-0, B Dunne 0-2, J Devane 0-1, T Dunne 0-1, G O’Grady 0-1, P Kelly 0-1.	Referee: J Sexton (Limerick)

24 April 2005 Round 3	Clare	5-16 - 1-15	Wexford	Cusack Park, Ennis
	T Carmody (2-6), N Gilligan (2-3, 0-1 free), D McMahon (1-0), S McMahon (0-2, one free and 65), B O'Connell (0-1), A Markham (0-1), C Plunkett (0-1), D O'Connell (0-1), A Quinn (0-1).		R Jacob 0-5, N Higgins 1-1, D Ruth 0-2, J O’Connor 0-2, B Lambert 0-2, E Quigley 0-1, M Jacob 0-1, MJ Furlong 0-1.

24 April 2005 Round 3	Cork	1-21 - 1-24	Galway	Páirc Uí Chaoimh, Cork
	J Deane 1-10, B O’Connor 0-2, N McCarthy 0-2, N Ronan 0-2, J Gardiner 0-2, K Murphy 0-1, E Collins 0-1, J O’Connor 0-1.		R Murray 1-4, E Cloonan 0-7, A Kerins 0-3, Damien Hayes 0-3, T Og O’Regan 0-3, K Hayes 0-2, D Collins 0-2.	Referee: B Gavin (Offaly)

=== Group 2 table ===
Relegated Team

Pos	Team	Pld	W	D	L	Pts
1	Waterford	3	3	0	0	6
2	Limerick	3	2	0	1	4
3	Laois	3	1	1	1	3
4	Antrim	3	1	1	1	3
4	Down	3	1	0	2	2
6	Dublin (R)	3	0	0	3	0

=== Group 2 results ===
10 April 2005 Round 1	Antrim	1-18 - 3-12	Laois	Casement Park, Belfast
	K McKeegan 1-5, M Herron 0-6, P Richmond 0-3, B Quinn 0-2, K Stewart 0-1, J McIntosh 0-1.		M Rooney 2-0, J Young 0-6, L Tynan 1-1, J Walsh 0-1, J Phelan 0-1, J Rowney 0-1, T Fitzgerald 0-1, C Brophy 0-1.	Referee: G Devlin (Armagh)

10 April 2005 Round 1	Down	4-15 - 4-9	Dublin	McKenna Park, Ballycran
	Gareth Johnston 3-1, M Coulter 1-2, Paul Braniff 0-4, B McGourty 0-3, S Wilson 0-2, E Clarke 0-1, J McCusker 0-1, S Clarke 0-1.		M Walsh 3-2, G O’Meara 1-1, E Carroll 0-2, D Curtin 0-2, S Hiney 0-1, D O’Reilly 0-1.	Referee: J McGrath (Westmeath)

10 April 2005 Round 1	Limerick	0-18 - 1-19	Waterford	Gaelic Grounds, Limerick
	A O’Connor 0-4, D Ryan 0-4, P O’Grady 0-3, C Fitzgerald 0-3, J O’Brien 0-1, N Moran 0-1, D O’Grady 0-1, S O’Connor 0-1.		P Flynn 1-11, T Browne 0-2, E Kelly 0-2, J Mullane 0-1, S Prendergast 0-1, M Walsh 0-1, E McGrath 0-1.	Referee: P Horan (Offaly)

17 April 2005 Round 2	Dublin	3-8 - 3-14	Limerick	Parnell Park, Dublin
	D Curtin 0-5, E Carroll 1-1, M Breathnach 1-0, T Moore 1-0, D Sweeney 0-1, R Fallon 0-1.		A O’Shaughnessy 1-3, M Cahill 1-2, J O’Brien 1-0, C Fitzgerald 0-3, A O’Connor 0-2, P Lawlor 0-1, O Moran 0-1, JP Sheehan 0-1, TJ Ryan 0-1.	Referee: P Horan (Offaly)

17 April 2005 Round 2	Waterford	3-21 - 1-10	Antrim	Fraher Field, Dungarvan
	P Flynn 0-7, J Mullane 1-3, E McGrath 1-2, S Prendergast 1-1, D Bennett 0-3, D Shanahan 0-2, E Kelly 0-2, A Maloney 0-1.		M Herron 1-3, J McIntosh 0-3, C McGuckian 0-1, K Stewart 0-1, J Campbell 0-1, B McFall 0-1.	Referee: S McMahon (Clare)

17 April 2005 Round 2	Laois	1-16 - 1-12	Down	O'Moore Park, Portlaoise
	J Young 0-5, D Culleton 1-1, L Tynan 0-2, M Rooney 0-1, R Jones 0-1, J Walsh 0-1, J Phelan 0-1, S Dwyer 0-1, P Russell 0-1, C Brophy 0-1, T Fitzgerald 0-1.		M Coulter 0-9, G Johnson 1-0, P Braniff 0-2, S Wilson 0-1.	Referee: J Guinan (Kilkenny)

24 April 2005 Round 3	Antrim	3-9 - 1-11	Dublin	Casement Park, Belfast
	C McGuckian 2-0, K Stewart 1-2, J McIntosh 0-5, M Herron 0-1, C Herron 0-1.		D Curtin 0-7, E Carroll 1-1, D O’Reilly 0-1, D Sweeney 0-1.	Referee: F Mac Gabhann (Meath)

24 April 2005 Round 3	Limerick	5-18 - 2-12	Laois	FitzGerald Park, Kilmallock
	N Moran 1-3, A O’Shaughnessy 0-5, O Moran 1-1, D Sheehan 1-1, TJ Ryan 0-4, C Fitzgerald 0-4, D Ryan 1-0, A O’Connor 1-0.		J Young 1-5, T Fitzgerald 1-1, C Coonan 0-3, J Phelan 0-1, P Russell 0-1, D Culleton 0-1.	Referee: M Haverty (Galway)

24 April 2005 Round 3	Waterford	3-18 - 0-19	Down	Fraher Field, Dungarvan
	E Kelly 1-7, P Foley 1-2, E McGrath 1-1, J Mullane 0-3, P O’Brien 0-2, D Shanahan 0-1, A Maloney 0-1, T Browne 0-1.		M Coulter 0-9, P Braniff 0-4, G Johnston 0-3, E Clarke 0-1, G Adair 0-1, S Clarke 0-1.	Referee: J Ryan (Tipperary)

=== Knock-out stage ===
Final

2 May 2005 Final	Kilkenny	3-20 - 0-15	Clare	Semple Stadium, Thurles
	H Shefflin 1-7, DJ Carey 1-2, E Larkin 1-2, T Walsh 0-3, E Brennan 0-2, M Comerford 0-2, B Barry 0-1, D Lyng 0-1.		N Gilligan 0-5, T Carmody 0-3, C Plunkett 0-2, S McMahon 0-2, B O’Connell 0-1, C Lyng 0-1, T Griffin 0-1.	Attendance: 22,500; Referee: G Harrinton (Cork)

=== Scoring statistics ===
Top scorers overall

Rank	Player	Team	Tally	Total	Matches	Average
1	Ger Farragher	Galway	2-54	60	7	8.57
2	Niall Gilligan	Clare	4-47	59	8	7.37
3	James Young	Laois	1-46	49	7	7.00
4	Eoin Kelly	Tipperary	2-38	44	6	7.33
5	Eoin Kelly	Waterford	2-37	43	8	5.37
6	David Curtin	Dublin	0-42	42	7	6.00
7	Tony Carmody	Clare	4-27	39	9	4.33
8	Alan O'Connor	Limerick	3-29	38	8	4.75
9	Paul Flynn	Waterford	3-28	37	6	6.16
9	Martin Coulter	Down	2-31	37	7	5.28

Top scorers in a single game

Rank	Player	Team	Tally	Total	Opposition
1	Ger Farragher	Galway	0-15	15	Kilkenny
2	Eoin Kelly	Tipperary	2-08	14	Antrim
2	Paul Flynn	Waterford	1-11	14	Limerick
4	Joe Deane	Cork	1-10	13	Galway
5	Tony Carmody	Clare	2-06	12	Wexford
5	Paul Flynn	Waterford	2-06	12	Clare
5	Ger Farragher	Galway	1-09	12	Laois
5	Niall Gilligan	Clare	0-12	12	Kilkenny
5	Ger Farragher	Galway	0-12	12	Wexford
10	Marcus Walsh	Dublin	3-02	11	Down
10	James Young	Laois	0-11	11	Galway
10	Paul Carley	Wexford	0-11	11	Tipperary
10	Neil Ronan	Cork	0-11	11	Down

=== Miscellaneous ===
- Wexford record their first victory over Tipperary at Semple Stadium since 1984.

== Division 2 ==
=== Division 2A table ===
Advance to Group 1

Advance to Group 2

Pos	Team	Pld	W	D	L	Pts
1	Offaly	4	4	0	0	8
2	Westmeath	4	3	0	1	6
3	Derry	4	2	0	2	4
4	Roscommon	4	1	0	3	2
5	Kildare	4	0	0	4	0

=== Division 2B table ===
Advance to Group 1

Advance to Group 2

Pos	Team	Pld	W	D	L	Pts
1	Carlow	5	5	0	0	10
2	Kerry	5	3	0	2	6
3	Meath	5	3	0	2	6
4	London	5	2	0	3	4
5	Wicklow	5	1	1	3	3
6	Sligo	5	0	1	4	1

=== Group 1 table ===
Division 2 Final

Pos	Team	Pld	W	D	L	Pts
1	Offaly (C, P)	3	2	0	1	4
2	Carlow	2	2	0	0	4
3	Derry	2	1	0	1	2
4	Westmeath	2	1	0	1	2
5	Meath	2	1	0	1	2
6	Kerry	3	0	0	3	0

=== Group 2 table ===
Relegated team

Pos	Team	Pld	W	D	L	Pts
1	Kildare	2	2	0	0	4
2	Wicklow	2	1	0	1	2
3	Roscommon	2	1	0	1	2
4	Sligo (R)	2	0	0	2	0

=== Knock-out stage ===
Final

2 May 2005 Final	Carlow	4-7 – 6-21	Offaly	Semple Stadium, Thurles

== Division 3 ==
=== Division 3A table ===
Pos	Team	Pld	W	D	L	Pts	Notes
1	Mayo	4	3	0	1	6	Advanced to Group 1
2	Armagh	4	3	0	1	6	Advanced to Group 1
3	Donegal	4	2	1	1	5	Advanced to Group 1
4	Longford	4	1	1	2	3	Advanced to Group 2
5	Leitrim	4	0	0	4	0	Advanced to Group 2

=== Division 3B table ===
Pos	Team	Pld	W	D	L	Pts	Notes
1	Louth	4	3	1	0	7	Advanced to Group 1
2	Monaghan	4	2	2	0	6	Advanced to Group 1
3	Tyrone	4	2	0	2	4	Advanced to Group 1
4	Fermanagh	4	1	1	2	3	Advanced to Group 2
5	Cavan	4	0	0	4	0	Advanced to Group 2

=== Group 1 table ===
Pos	Team	Pld	W	D	L	Pts	Notes
1	Donegal	3	3	0	0	6	Division 3 champions
2	Armagh	3	3	0	0	6	Division 3 runners-up
3	Mayo	2	2	0	0	4	
4	Tyrone	2	0	0	2	0	
5	Louth	3	0	0	3	0	
6	Monaghan	3	0	0	3	0	

=== Group 2 table ===
Pos	Team	Pld	W	D	L	Pts	Notes
1	Longford	2	1	1	0	3	Division 3 Shield champion
2	Fermanagh	2	1	1	0	3	Division 3 Shield runner-up
3	Leitrim	2	1	0	1	2	
4	Cavan	2	0	0	2	0	

=== Knock-out stage ===
Shield Final

7 May 2005 Shield Final	Fermanagh	0-15 – 1-5	Longford	Breffni Park, Cavan
		Report

Final

1 May 2005 Final	Donegal	1-14 – 2-10	Mayo	Markievicz Park, Sligo
