= Mattie Kenny =

Irish hurler and manager

Personal information
- Native name: Máirtín Ó Cionnaith (Irish)
- Nickname: Mattie
- Born: 1964 (age 61–62) Duniry, County Galway, Ireland

Sport
- Sport: Hurling
- Position: Left corner-forward
Club
- Years: Club
- Abbey/Duniry
Club titles
- Galway titles: 0
Inter-county
- Years: County
- 1988-1992: Galway
Inter-county titles
- All-Irelands: 0
- NHL: 0
- All Stars: 0

Thomas Martin Kenny (born 1964), better known as Mattie Kenny, is an Irish hurling manager and former player who is the former manager of the Dublin senior hurling team. As a player he lined out with Galway Senior Championship club Abbey/Duniry and the Galway senior hurling team.

== Playing career ==
=== Abbey/Duniry ===
Kenny joined the Abbey/Duniry club at a young age and played in all grades at juvenile and underage levels before eventually joining the club's top adult team in the Galway Intermediate Championship.

On 22 October 1989, Kenny lined out at left wing-forward when Abbey/Duniry faced Portumna in the final. He top scored with 0-10, including 0-06 from frees, in the 0-14 to 1-11 draw. Kenny retained his position for the replay on 5 November 1989. He was gain the game's top scorer with 2-05 and collected a winners' medal after the 3-06 to 2-05 victory.

On 25 October 1998, Kenny was selected at full-forward when the Abbey/Duniry senior team faced Athenry in the final. He scored a point from play in the 0-09 apiece draw. Kenny retained his position at full-forward for the replay on 1 November 1998 and scored 1-05 in the 1-15 to 1-12 defeat.

Kenny lined out in a second successive senior final on 24 October 1999. He top scored for the team with 0-07, all from frees, but ended that game on the losing side following a 1-16 to 1-10 defeat by Athenry.

=== Galway ===
==== Under-21 ====
Kenny was just 19-years-old when he first played for Galway as a member of the under-21 team during the 1983 All-Ireland Championship. He made his first appearance for the team on 21 August 1983 when he lined out at midfield in a 2-10 to 1-07 defeat of Laois. Kenny was relegated to the substitutes' bench for the All-Ireland final on 11 September 1983. He was introduced as a substitute and claimed a winners' medal following the 0-12 to 1-06 defeat of Tipperary.

== Management career ==
=== Cuala ===
On 9 January 2014, it was announced that Kenny had been appointed to the position of head coach with the Cuala senior hurling team.

In his second season in charge, Kenny guided Cuala to their first Dublin Senior Championship title in 21 years following a 3-14 to 0-13 defeat of St. Jude's in the final on 31 October 2014. On 29 November 2015, Kenny's side suffered a 2-13 to 0-13 defeat by Oulart-the Ballagh in the Leinster final.

On 29 October 2016, Kenny secured a second successive Dublin Senior Championship after Cuala's 1-15 to 0-15 defeat of Kilmacud Crokes in the final. Cuala secured the Leinster Championship on 4 December 2016 after a 1-15 to 0-15 defeat of O'Loughlin Gaels in the final. On 17 March 2017, Kenny steered Cuala to the All-Ireland Championship title after a 2-19 to 1-10 defeat of Ballyea in the All-Ireland final.

Kenny guided Cuala to a third successive Dublin Senior Championship title on 28 October 2017 after a 1-13 to 0-13 defeat of Kilmacud Crokes in the final. On 3 December 2017, Cuala retained their Leinster Championship title for the second year in succession after a 1-23 to 1-09 defeat of Kilcormac/Killoughey. On 17 March 2017, Kenny's side were denied a second successive All-Ireland Championship title after a 1-22 to 2-19 draw with Na Piarsaigh in the All-Ireland final. The replay on 24 March 2018 saw Cuala claim the title following a 2-17 to 1-17 victory.

Cuala's bid for a fourth successive Dublin Senior Championship title ended with a two-point semi-final defeat by Kilmacud Crokes on 7 October 2018. Kenny stepped down as manager shortly after this defeat.

=== Galway ===
==== Under-21 ====
Kenny was appointed coach/trainer to the Galway under-21 hurling team in advance of the 2005 All-Ireland Championship. His first season with the team saw Galway suffer a 0-20 to 0-15 defeat by Kilkenny in the All-Ireland semi-final.

On 18 September 2005, Kenny help guide Galway to an All-Ireland final appearance against Kilkenny. His side claimed the title following a 1-15 to 1-14 victory.

After a number of years away from the Galway under-21 team, Kenny returned as coach under Anthony Cunningham for the 2010 All-Ireland Championship. On 11 September 2010, Galway suffered a 5-22 to 0-12 defeat by Tipperary in the All-Ireland final.

On 10 September 2011, Kenny helped guide the Galway under-21 team to a second successive All-Ireland final appearance. His side secured their first title in four years after a 3-14 to 1-10 defeat of Dublin.

==== Senior ====
In October 2011, Kenny was appointed coach of the Galway senior hurling team under new manager Anthony Cunningham. His first season in the role saw Galway secure their very first Leinster Championship title following a 2-21 to 2-12 defeat of Kilkenny in the final. On 9 September 2012, both sides again clashed in the All-Ireland final but the game ended in a draw. The replay on 30 September 2012 saw Kenny's side suffer a 3-22 to 3-11 defeat.

On 7 July 2013, Kenny coached Galway to a second successive Leinster final, however, his side suffered a 2-25 to 2-13 defeat by Dublin. Kenny resigned as coach following Galway's exit from the championship.

=== Dublin ===
On 3 November 2018, Kenny succeeded Pat Gilroy as manager of the Dublin senior hurling team. His tenure got off to a good start when Dublin topped Division 1B of the National League and qualified for the knockout stage. Dublin's campaign ended at the semi-final stage with a 1-19 to 1-16 defeat by Limerick. On 15 June 2019, Kenny's Dublin secured a surprise 3-19 to 0-24 defeat of Galway in the Leinster Championship to secure third place in the group and qualify for the All-Ireland Championship. Dublin were themselves surprised in the next round when they suffered a 1-22 to 0-23 defeat by Laois.

In July 2022, Kenny stepped down as manager after four years in charge.

== Honours ==
=== Player ===
Abbey/Duniry

- Galway Intermediate Hurling Championship (1): 1989

Galway

- All-Ireland Under-21 Hurling Championship (1): 1983

=== Management ===
Cuala

- All-Ireland Senior Club Hurling Championship (2): 2017, 2018
- Leinster Senior Club Hurling Championship (2): 2016, 2017
- Dublin Senior Hurling Championship (3): 2015, 2016, 2017

Galway

- Leinster Senior Hurling Championship (1): 2012
- All-Ireland Under-21 Hurling Championship (2): 2005, 2011

Sporting positions
Preceded by Pat Gilroy	Dublin Senior Hurling Manager; 2018-2022	Succeeded by Micheál Donoghue
