= Brian Gath =

Irish hurler

Personal information
- Native name: Brian Mac Graith (Irish)
- Born: 1971 (age 54–55) Drumcullen, County Offaly, Ireland
- Occupation: Hurley maker

Sport
- Sport: Hurling
- Position: Right corner-back
Club
- Years: Club
- Drumcullen
Club titles
- Offaly titles: 0
Inter-county
Years	County	Apps (scores)
1990-1997	Offaly	0 (0-00)
Inter-county titles
- Leinster titles: 0
- All-Irelands: 0
- NHL: 0
- All Stars: 0

Brian Gath (born 1971) is an Irish former hurler. At club level, he played with Drumcullen and at inter-county level with the Offaly senior hurling team.

== Career ==
Gath first played hurling at juvenile and underage levels with the Drumcullen club before progressing to adult level. At inter-county level, he first played for Offaly as a member of the minor team in 1988. Gath progressed to the under-21 team and was an unused substitute when Waterford beat Offaly by 0–12 to 2–03 in the 1992 All-Ireland U21HC final. He made his senior team debut in a National Hurling League game against Meath in November 1990 and made a number of league appearances until his final game in June 1997. Gath later lined out as a Gaelic footballer with the Offaly team in New York.

== Honours ==
Offaly

- Leinster Under-21 Hurling Championship (1): 1992
