= 2010 All-Ireland Under-21 Hurling Championship final =

2010 All-Ireland Under-21 Hurling Championship Final
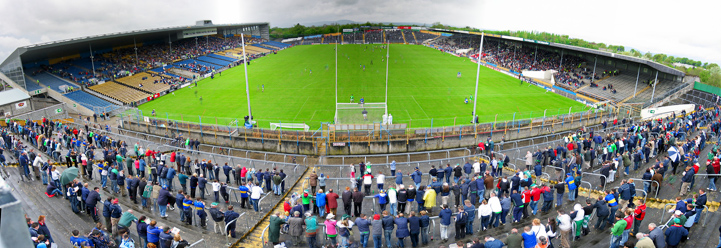
- Event: 2010 All-Ireland Under-21 Hurling Championship
Tipperary	Galway
5-22	0-12
- Date: 11 September 2010
- Venue: Semple Stadium, Thurles
- Man of the Match: Brian O'Meara (hurler)
- Referee: James McGrath (Westmeath)
- Attendance: 21,110

The 2010 All-Ireland Under-21 Hurling Championship final was a hurling match that was played at Semple Stadium, Thurles on 11 September 2010 to determine the winners of the 2010 All-Ireland Under-21 Hurling Championship, the 47th season of the All-Ireland Under-21 Hurling Championship, a tournament organised by the Gaelic Athletic Association for the champion teams of the four provinces of Ireland. The final was contested by Tipperary of Munster and Galway of Connacht, with Tipperary winning by 5-22 to 0-12.

The All-Ireland final between Tipperary and Galway was the fourth All-Ireland final meeting between the two teams. Both sides were hoping to claim their ninth All-Ireland title with Tipperary hoping for their first win since 1995 and Galway hoping for their first title since 2007.

Tipperary started the game with a goal rush. Barely a minute had elapsed when Brian O'Meara banged in the first, and two minutes later, it was John O'Dwyer who added a second. Barry Daly got Galway off the mark in the sixth minute, however, Tipperary opened up a 2-4 to 0-2 lead by the 13th minute. Two minutes later they struck for a third goal when Seán Carey drilled a low shot to the bottom corner of the net. Galway enjoyed a productive spell and finished the half strongly, with David Burke powering over a couple of long range frees to narrow the gap to seven.

Tipperary stretched their 3-7 to 0-9 lead after the interval with Noel McGrath and O'Meara scoring some excellent points. James Logue also made another excellent save to deny Gerard Kelly, who fired in an angled shot on a breakaway raid. Patrick Maher subsequently sliced his way through the Galway defence to fire home Tipperary's fourth goal. Galway were already in need of a goal, but they could find no way past Tipp 'keeper Logue. Galway were caught out once again at the back, when Noel McGrath’s long range free deceived goalkeeper Finnegan and went all the way to the net. Galway finished with 14-men after centre forward Niall Quinn received a straight red card seven minutes from the end as Tipperary added several more points.

Tipperary's All-Ireland victory was their first in fifteen years. The win gave them their ninth All-Ireland title over all and put them in joint third position with Galway on the all-time roll of honour.

== Match ==
=== Details ===
11 September 2010

Tipperary	5-22 - 0-12	Galway
J O’Dwyer (1f), B O’Meara (1f), S Carey, N McGrath (one goal free) 1-3 each; Patrick Maher 1-0; S Hennessy 0-3 (1‘65, 1f); M Heffernan, P Murphy 0-2 each; J O’Neill, K Morris (1f) 0-1 each.	Report	J Coen, D Burke (2fs), 0-2 each; B Daly, J Regan, N Quinn, G Burke, G Kelly, J Cooney, J Grealish, B Burke, 0-1 each.

Semple Stadium, Thurles
Attendance: 21,110
Referee: J McGrath (Westmeath)

Tipperary	Galway
