= Colm Callanan =

Galway hurling goalkeeper

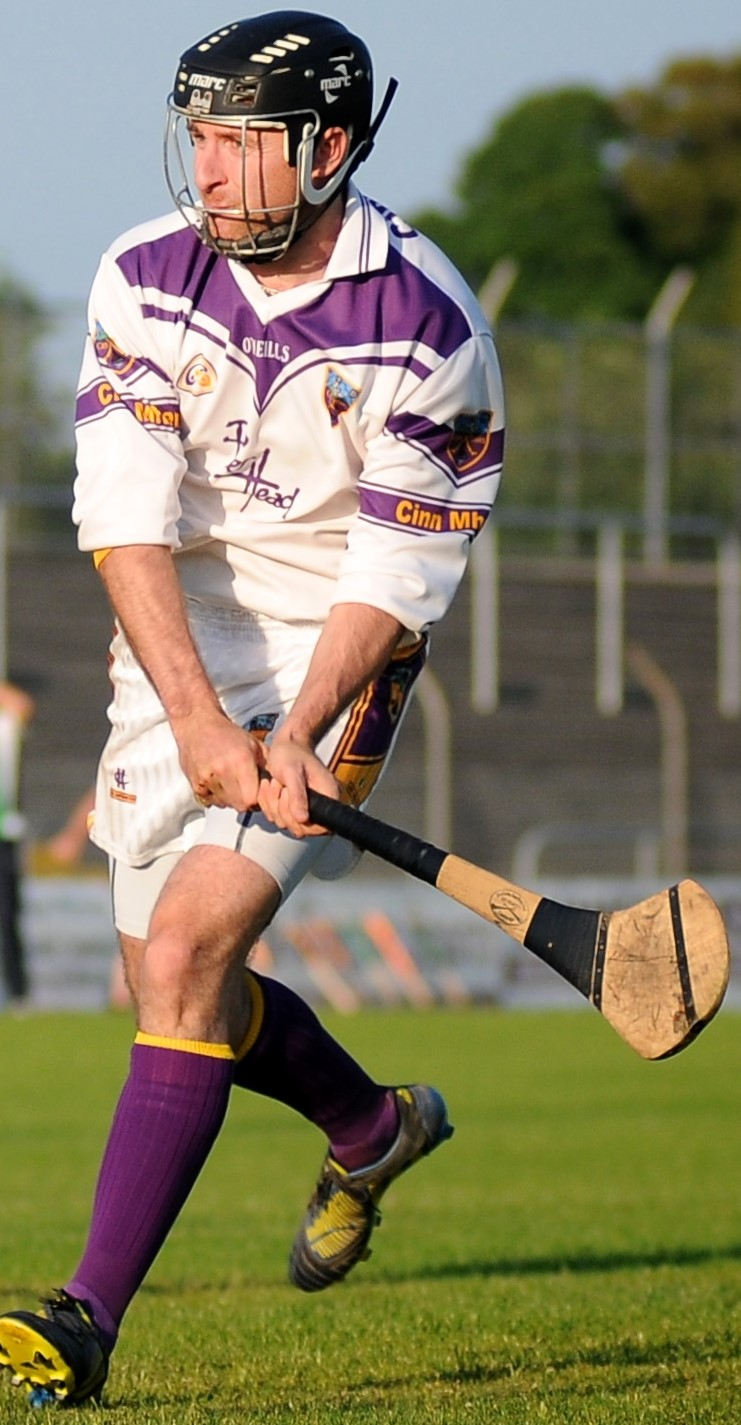

Personal information
- Native name: Colm Ó Callanáin (Irish)
- Born: 18 July 1982 (age 44) Kinvara, County Galway, Ireland
- Occupation: Personal trainer
- Height: 1.8 m (5 ft 11 in)

Sport
- Sport: Hurling
- Position: Goalkeeper
Club
- Years: Club
- 2000–present: Kinvara
Club titles
- Galway titles: 0
College
- Years: College
- 2000–2005: Galway-Mayo Institute of Technology
College titles
- Fitzgibbon titles: 0
Inter-county*
Years	County	Apps (scores)
2007–2019	Galway	41 (0–02)
Inter-county titles
- Leinster titles: 2
- All-Irelands: 1
- NHL: 2
- All Stars: 1
- *Inter County team apps and scores correct as of 18:22, 26 November 2019.

Colm Callanan (born 18 July 1982) is an Irish hurler who plays for Galway Senior Championship club Kinvara. He played for the Galway senior hurling team for 12 years, during which time he lined out as a goalkeeper.

Born in Kinvara, County Galway, Callanan was born into a strong hurling family. His mother, Mary Daly, played camogie and was an All-Ireland medal winner with Athenry while also playing for Galway and Connacht.

Callanan first played competitive hurling with the Kinvara club at juvenile and underage levels. In spite of beginning his club career as an outfield player, he was eighteen when he became the goalkeeper on the club's senior team.

Callanan made his debut on the inter-county scene at the age of eighteen when he was selected for the Galway minor team. He won an All-Ireland medal as a non-playing substitute in 2000 before later joining the Galway under-21 team. Callanan made his senior debut during the 2007 championship and has since enjoyed much success, culminating with the winning of an All-Ireland medal in 2017. He has also won two Leinster medals and two National Hurling League medals.

In November 2019, Callanan announced his retirement form inter-county hurling.

== Playing career ==
=== Kinvara ===
Callanan joined the Kinvara club at a young age and played in all grades at juvenile and underage levels. He joined the club's senior team as a 17-year-old prior to the start of the 2000 Galway Senior Championship.

On 21 October 2007, Callanan lined out in goal when Kinvara faced Portumnna in their first senior final appearance since 1979. After conceding six goals he ended up on the losing side as Kinvara suffered a 6–12 to 0–11 defeat.

On 3 November 2019, Callanan was selected in goal when Kinvara qualified for the Galway Intermediate Championship final. His long-range free in the fifth minute of injury-time was instrumental in setting up the winning goal, with Kinvara claiming a 1–10 to 0–12 victory over Kilconieron. On 17 November 2019, Callanan was again in goal when Kinvara qualified for the Connacht final. He kept a clean sheet but ended the game on the losing side after a 0–21 to 2–10 defeat by Tooreen.

=== Galway ===
==== Minor and under-21 ====
Callanan was called for a trial with the Galway minor team in March 2000, however, he failed to make the panel for the All-Ireland Championship.

Callanan was added to the Galway under-21 team as sub-goalkeeper to Adrian Diviney prior to the start of the 2002 All-Ireland Championship. On 15 September 2002, he was named amongst the substitutes when Galway qualified for the All-Ireland final against Limerick. Callanan remained on the bench for the 3–17 to 0–08 defeat.

On 23 August 2003, Callanan made his first appearance for the Galway under-21 when he lined out in goal in Galway's 2–20 to 2–16 defeat of Tipperary in the All-Ireland semi-final. He again lined out in goal for Galway's 2–13 to 0–12 defeat by Kilkenny in the All-Ireland final on 21 September 2003.

==== Senior ====
Callanan was added to the Galway senior team at the start of the 2007 season. He was an unused substitute throughout the National League before making his debut on 30 June 2007 in a 3–20 to 1-14 All-Ireland Qualifier defeat of Laois.

On 2 May 2010, Callanan lined out in goal when Galway faced Cork in the National League final. He ended the game with a winners' medal following the 2–22 to 1–17 victory. On 4 July 2010, Callanan lined out in his first Leinster final, but ended the game on the losing side after a 1–19 to 1–12 defeat by Kilkenny.

Callanan was dropped from the Galway panel by new manager Anthony Cunningham at the end of the 2011 season. An injury to first-choice goalkeeper James Skehill in advance of the All-Ireland final replay on 30 September 2012 saw Callanan recalled to the panel. He remained on the bench for Galway's 3–22 to 3–11 defeat by Kilkenny.

On 7 July 2013, Callanan was an unused substitute when Galway suffered a 2–25 to 2–13 defeat by Dublin in the Leinster final.

Callanan was back as first-choice goalkeeper for the Leinster final against Kilkenny on 5 July 2015. He ended the game on the losing side following a 1–23 to 2–17 defeat. On 6 September 2015, Callanan again lined out in goal for Galway's 1–22 to 1-18 All-Ireland final defeat by Kilkenny. He ended the season by receiving a GAA/GPA All-Star.

On 3 July 2016, Callanan lined out in goal in the third Leinster final of his career. He ended the game on the losing side after a 1–26 to 0–22 defeat by Kilkenny.

On 22 April 2017, Callanan won a second National League medal after a 3–21 to 0–14 victory over Tipperary in the final. The subsequent championship saw Galway qualify for a Leinster final meeting with Wexford, with Callanan claiming his third winners' medal after the 0–29 to 1–17 victory. On 3 September 2017, Callanan was in goal when Galway faced Waterford in the All-Ireland final. He conceded two goals but ended the game with an All-Ireland medal after the 0–29 to 2–17 victory and a first All-Ireland Championship for Galway in 29 years.

Callanan returned to the panel for the 2018 season, however, a series of muscle injuries hampered his progress and he was relegated to third-choice goalkeeper. Injury ruled him out of Galway's 1–28 to 3–15 defeat of Kilkenny in the Leinster final replay on 8 July 2018, however, he collected a second winners' medal as a member of the extended panel. On 19 August 2018, Callanan was again third-choice goalkeeper and a member of the extended panel when Galway suffered a 3–16 to 2–18 defeat by Limerick in the All-Ireland final.

Callanan made just one appearance in the 2019 National League, however, he was back as Galway's first-choice goalkeeper for the 2019 Leinster Championship and lined out in goal for all four games in their unsuccessful campaign. On 25 November 2019, Callanan announced his retirement from inter-county hurling.

== Post-playing career ==
Callanan has been goalkeeping coach of the Offaly senior hurling team.

== Career statistics ==
Team	Year	National League			Leinster		All-Ireland		Total	
Team	Year	Division	Apps	Score	Apps	Score	Apps	Score	Apps	Score
Galway	2007	Division 1B	0	0-00	—		4	0-01	4	0-01
Galway	2008	Division 1B	0	0-00	—		1	0-00	1	0-00
Galway	2009	Division 1	4	0-01	2	0-00	3	0-00	9	0-01
Galway	2010	Division 1	5	0-00	4	0-00	1	0-00	10	0-00
Galway	2011	Division 1	5	0-00	0	0-00	0	0-00	5	0-00
Galway	2012	Division 1A	0	0-00	0	0-00	0	0-00	0	0-00
Galway	2013	Division 1A	4	0-00	0	0-00	1	0-00	5	0-00
Galway	2014	Division 1A	7	0-01	3	0-00	1	0-00	11	0-01
Galway	2015	Division 1A	5	0-00	4	0-00	3	0-00	12	0-00
Galway	2016	Division 1A	0	0-00	3	0-00	2	0-00	5	0-00
Galway	2017	Division 1B	6	0-01	3	0-00	2	0-00	11	0-01
Galway	2018	Division 1B	0	0-00	0	0-00	0	0-00	0	0-00
Galway	2019	Division 1B	1	0-00	4	0-01	—		5	0-01
Total			37	0-03	23	0-01	18	0-01	78	0-05

== Honours ==
Kinvara

- Galway Intermediate Hurling Championship (1): 2019

Galway

- All-Ireland Senior Hurling Championship (1): 2017
- Leinster Senior Hurling Championship (2): 2017, 2018
- National Hurling League (2): 2010, 2017

Awards

- GAA GPA All Stars Awards (1): 2015
