= David Dooley =

Irish hurler

Personal information
- Native name: Daithí Ó Dúlaoich (Irish)
- Born: 1970 (age 55–56) Coolderry, County Offaly, Ireland
- Occupation: Farm manager

Sport
- Sport: Hurling
- Position: Right wing-back
Club
- Years: Club
- Coolderry
Inter-county
Years	County	Apps (scores)
1992-1994	Offaly	0 (0-00)
Inter-county titles
- Leinster titles: 1
- All-Irelands: 1
- NHL: 0
- All Stars: 0

David Dooley (born 1970) is an Irish former hurler. At club level, he played with Coolderry and at inter-county level with the Offaly senior hurling team.

== Career ==
Dooley first played hurling at juvenile and underage levels with Coolderry, before progressing to the club's senior team. He won an Offaly SHC medal in 2004, following Coolderry's 3–10 to 2–11 win over Birr in the final. Dooley continued his club career until he was in his late forties.

At inter-county level, Dooley made his first appearance for Offaly as part of the minor team beaten by Kilkenny in the 1988 Leinster MHC final. He later progressed to under-21 level and won a Leinster U21HC before a defeat by Galway in the 1991 All-Ireland U21HC final. Dooley made his senior team debut in a National Hurling League game in November 1992. He made a number of appearances in the league over the following few seasons and was an unused substitute when Offaly beat Limerick in the 1994 All-Ireland final.

== Honours ==
Coolderry

- Offaly Senior Hurling Championship: 1994

Offaly

- All-Ireland Senior Hurling Championship: 1994
- Leinster Senior Hurling Championship: 1994
- Leinster Under-21 Hurling Championship: 1991
