= Seán Óg Farrell =

Irish hurler

Personal information
- Native name: Seán Óg Ó Fearail (Irish)
- Born: December 1971 (age 54) Edenderry, County Offaly, Ireland

Sport
- Sport: Hurling
- Position: Midfield
Club
- Years: Club
- Edenderry
Club titles
| | Football | Hurling |
| Offaly titles | 3 | 0 |
Inter-county
| Years | County | Apps (scores) |
| 1992-1997 | Offaly | 0 (0-00) |
Inter-county titles
- Leinster titles: 1
- All-Irelands: 1
- NHL: 0
- All Stars: 0

Seán Óg Farrell (born December 1971) is an Irish former hurler. At club level, he played with Edenderry and at inter-county level with the Offaly senior hurling team.

== Career ==
Farrell first played hurling and Gaelic football at juvenile and underage levels with Edenderry, before progressing to the club's senior teams as a dual player. He won an Offaly JAHC medal in 1998, before claiming a second winners' medal 24 years later in 2022. Farrell, alongside his brother Cillian, also won three Offaly SFC medals between 1999 and 2011.

At inter-county level, Farrell made his first appearance for Offaly at under-21 level. He won a Leinster U21HC before a defeat by Waterford in the 1992 All-Ireland U21HC final. Farrell made his senior team debut in a National Hurling League game in October 1992. He made a number of appearances in the league over the following few seasons and was an unused substitute when Offaly beat Limerick in the 1994 All-Ireland final.

== Honours ==
Edenderry

- Offaly Senior Football Championship: 1999, 2001, 2011
- Offaly Junior A Hurling Championship: 1998, 2022

Offaly

- All-Ireland Senior Hurling Championship: 1994
- Leinster Senior Hurling Championship: 1994
- Leinster Under-21 Hurling Championship: 1992
