= 1993 All-Ireland Under-21 Hurling Championship =

All-Ireland Under-21 Hurling Championship 1993
Championship Details
- Dates: 16 April 1993 – 3 October 1993
- Teams: 17

All Ireland Champions
- Winners: Galway (6th win)
- Captain: Liam Burke

All Ireland Runners-up
- Runners-up: Kilkenny
- Captain: David Beirne

Provincial Champions
- Munster: Cork
- Leinster: Kilkenny
- Ulster: Derry
- Connacht: Galway

Championship Statistics
- Top Scorer: Damian Lawlor (3-29)

The 1993 All-Ireland Under-21 Hurling Championship was the 30th staging of the All-Ireland Under-21 Hurling Championship since its establishment by the Gaelic Athletic Association in 1964. The championship began on 16 April 1993 and ended on 3 October 1993.

Waterford entered the championship as the defending champions, however, they were beaten by Limerick in the first round of the Munster Championship.

On 3 October 1993, Galway won the championship following a 2–09 to 3–03 defeat of Kilkenny in a replay of the All-Ireland final. This was their sixth All-Ireland title overall and their first title since 1991.

Kilkenny's Damian Lawlor was the championship's top scorer with 3-29.

== Results ==
=== Leinster Under-21 Hurling Championship ===
Quarter-finals

9 June 1993 Quarter-final	Offaly	1-11 - 0-10	Dublin	Dr. Cullen Park, Carlow
	M Gallagher 0-4, P Bergin 1-0, D Barron 0-3, K Flynn 0-2, D Murphy 0-1, P McLoughlin 0-1.		N Butler 0-6, N Fleming 0-1, E Burke 0-1, J Small 0-1, G Cullen 0-1.

29 June 1993 Quarter-final	Wexford	0-03 - 2-23	Westmeath	O'Moore Park, Portlaoise
	B Murray 0-1, R Galvin 0-1, B Kennedy 0-1.		A Fenlon 0-6, E Scallan 0-5, M Morrissey 1-1, P Finn 0-4, L Murphy 1-0, T Kehoe 0-2, S Hughes 0-2, J Byrne 0-2, A Whelan 0-1.	Referee: M Sheridan (Kildare)

Semi-finals

1 July 1993 Semi-final	Kilkenny	1-13 - 1-08	Offaly	O'Moore Park, Portlaoise
	D Lawlor 0-6, D Maher 1-1, PJ Delaney 0-2, A Comerford 0-1, S Ryan 0-1, P Long 0-1, P Farrell 0-1.		D Barron 1-1, M Gallagher 0-4, K Martin 0-1, K Flynn 0-1, O O'Neill 0-1.	Referee: T Kirwan (Wexford)

21 July 1993 Semi-final	Wexford	1-19 - 1-11	Laois	Nowlan Park, Kilkenny
	J Byrne 0-13, P Finn 1-1, P Murphy 0-3, T Kavanagh 0-1, E Scallan 0-1.		T Kenna 0-8, S Moore 1-0, PJ Peacock 0-1, B McEvoy 0-1, S Kennedy 0-1.	Referee: P Dunphy (Kilkenny)

Final

31 July 1993 Final	Kilkenny	4-13 - 2-07	Wexford	Dr. Cullen Park, Carlow
	D Lawlor 1-9, PJ Delaney 2-0, S Ryan 1-0, A Comerford 0-2, J Shefflin 0-1, D O'Neill 0-1.		L Murphy 2-0, J Byrne 0-3, A Fenlon 0-1, R Hassey 0-1, P Finn 0-1, E Scallan 0-1.	Referee: P Aherne (Carlow)

=== Munster Under-21 Hurling Championship ===
First round

14 April 1993 First round	Cork	w/o - scr.	Kerry	Kanturk Sportsfield, Kanturk

16 April 1993 First round	Waterford	4-08 - 5-09	Limerick	Walsh Park, Waterford
	P Flynn 2-4, P Foley 2-1, F Hartley 0-2, T Browne 0-1.		M Wallace 3-3, S O'Neill 2-1, J Moran 0-4, N Doolin 0-1.	Referee: J McDonnell (Tipperary)

Semi-finals

24 June 1993 Semi-final	Limerick	3-10 - 1-10	Clare	Gaelic Grounds, Limerick
	M Wallace 2-0, JA Moran 0-6, N Doolin 1-0, J Kiely 0-1, S Murphy 0-1, J Flavin 0-1, O O'Neill 0-1.		J O'Connor 0-6, P O'Rourke 1-0, D Tobin 0-2, B Healy 0-1, S Sheehy 0-1.

24 June 1993 Semi-final	Cork	4-10 - 2-14	Tipperary	Páirc Uí Chaoimh, Cork
	B Corcoran 2-1, K Murray 1-2, B Egan 0-5, B McCarthy 1-0, D O'Mahony 0-1, A White 0-1.		B O'Meara 1-3, P O'Keeffe 1-2, J Doughan 0-5, T Dunne 0-1, T Fogarty 0-1, B O'Dwyer 0-1, A Hogan 0-1.	Referee: K Walsh (Clare)

Final

23 July 1993 Final	Cork	1-18 - 3-09	Limerick	Páirc Uí Chaoimh, Cork
	B Egan 0-5, K Murray 0-4, B McCarthy 1-0, B Corcoran 0-3, D O'Mahony 0-2, A White 0-1, A Browne 0-1, B Walsh 0-1, C Dillons 0-1.		M Wallace 2-1, JA Moran 0-7, S O'Neill 1-0, J Moran 0-1.

=== Ulster Under-21 Hurling Championship ===
Semi-finals

29 May 1993 Semi-final	Tyrone	1-05 - 2-19	Antrim	Healy Park, Omagh
	S Bradley 1-0, B McIntosh 0-2, C McBride 0-2, B O'Neill 0-1.		P Molloy 1-4, E O'Hara 0-4, P Donnelly 1-0, D O'Hara 1-0, P Laverty 0-3, C McCambridge 0-3, C Magee 0-1, J McFetridge 0-1.	Referee: HP McCusker (Down)

29 May 1993 Semi-final	Derry	1-17 - 1-07	Down	Celtic Park, Derry
				Referee: T McIntyre (Antrim)

Final

19 June 1993 Final	Antirm	1-08 - 2-13	Derry	Casement Park, Belfast
	P Montgomery 1-5, J Connolly 0-1, R Donnelly 0-1, E Graham 0-1.		G Biggs 0-7, D Collins 1-3, M McKenna 1-0, G McGonigle 0-1, M McCloskey 0-1, R Stevenson 0-1.	Referee: JA Gribben (Down)

=== All-Ireland Under-21 Hurling Championship ===
Semi-finals

21 August 1993 Semi-final	Derry	2-10 - 3-22	Kilkenny	Dean McGlinchey Park, Ballinascreen
	G Biggs 0-7, M McKenna 1-1, G McGonigle 1-0, O Collins 0-1, R Stevenson 0-1.		D Lawlor 0-7, P Farrell 0-7, S Ryan 2-0, J Shefflin 1-0, D O'Neill 0-3, D Maher 0-3, M Owens 0-2.	Referee: J McDonnell (Tipperary)

21 August 1993 Semi-final	Galway	1-09 - 1-07	Cork	Semple Stadium, Thurles
	T Kirwan 0-4, J McGrath 1-0, M Headd 0-2, L Burke 0-2, D Coleman 0-1.		B Egan 0-4, B McCarthy 1-0, D O'Mahony 0-1, J Smith 0-1, I Ronan 0-1.	Referee: P Delaney (Laois)

Finals

12 September 1993 Final	Galway	2-14 - 3-11	Kilkenny	O'Connor Park, Tullamore
	M Headd 1-3, L Bourke 1-1, F Forde 0-4, J McGrath 0-2, D Colman 0-2, T Kirwan 0-1, P Kelly 0-1.		D Lawlor 1-5, C Brennan 1-3, M Owens 1-0, P Farrell 0-3.	Attendance: 18,000; Referee: J McDonnell (Tipperary)

3 October 1993 Final replay	Galway	2-09 - 3-03	Kilkenny	O'Connor Park, Tullamore
	M Headd 1-3, F Forde 1-3, M Kerins 0-1, T Kirwin 0-1, C O'Doherty 0-1.		D Lawlor 1-2, PJ Delaney 1-0, P Hennessy 1-0, C Brennan 0-1.	Attendance: 13,000; Referee: J McDonnell (Tipperary)

== Championship statistics ==
=== Top scorers ===
Overall

Rank	Player	Club	Tally	Total	Matches	Average
1	Damian Lawlor	Kilkenny	3-29	38	5	7.60
2	Michael Wallace	Limerick	7-04	25	3	8.33
3	Jim Byrne	Wexford	0-18	18	3	6.00
