= John Paul Corcoran =

Irish hurler

Personal information
- Native name: Seán Pól Ó Corcáin (Irish)
- Nickname: JP
- Born: 1979 (age 46–47) Callan, County Kilkenny, Ireland
- Occupation: Chimney cleaner
- Height: 5 ft 11 in (180 cm)

Sport
- Sport: Hurling
- Position: Full-back
Club
- Years: Club
- John Locke's
Club titles
- Kilkenny titles: 0
Inter-county
- Years: County
- 2000–2001: Kilkenny
Inter-county titles
- Leinster titles: 2
- All-Irelands: 1
- NHL: 0
- All Stars: 0

John Paul Corcoran (born 1979) is an Irish former hurler. At club level, he played with John Locke's and at inter-county level with the Kilkenny senior hurling team.

== Career ==
Born and raised in Callan, County Kilkenny, Corcoran played hurling at all levels as a student at Coláiste Éamann Rís. He was part of the school's senior team that won the Leinster Colleges SHC title after a 1–10 to 0–09 defeat of St Kieran's College in 1998.

At club level, Corcoran first played for John Locke's at juvenile and underage levels. He won a Kilkenny MBHC medal in 1997 before progressing to the club's adult team. Corcoran was at midfield when John Locke's beat Mullinavat by 0–15 to 1–09 to win the Kilkenny IHC in 1999. After winning Kilkenny JHC and Leinster Club JHC medals in 2010, he was part of the John Locke's team beaten by Meelin in the 2011 All-Ireland Club JHC final.

Corcoran first appeared on the inter-county scene with Kilkenny as part of the minor team that won the Leinster MHC title in 1997. He progressed to the under-21 team and won an All-Ireland U21HC medal after a 1–13 to 0–14 win over Galway in the All-Ireland U21HC final.

As well as being part of the under-21 team, Corcoran was drafted onto the senior team in 2000. He made a number of appearances as a substitute and won consecutive Leinster SHC medals over the following two years. Corcoran was also an unused substitute when Kilkenny beat Offaly by 5–15 to 1–14 in the 2000 All-Ireland SHC final.

== Honours ==
Coláiste Éamann Rís

- Leinster Colleges Senior Hurling Championship: 1998

Erin's Own

- Kilkenny Intermediate Hurling Championship: 1999
- Leinster Junior Club Hurling Championship: 2010
- Kilkenny Junior Hurling Championship: 2010
- Kilkenny Minor B Hurling Championship: 1997

Kilkenny

- All-Ireland Senior Hurling Championship: 2000
- Leinster Senior Hurling Championship: 2000, 2001
- All-Ireland Under-21 Hurling Championship: 1994
- Leinster Under-21 Hurling Championship: 1999
- Leinster Minor Hurling Championship: 1997
