= 1994 All-Ireland Under-21 Hurling Championship =

All-Ireland Under-21 Hurling Championship 1994
Championship Details
- Dates: 28 May – 11 September 1994
- Teams: 16

All Ireland Champions
- Winners: Kilkenny (6th win)
- Captain: Philly Larkin
- Manager: Brendan O'Sullivan

All Ireland Runners-up
- Runners-up: Galway
- Captain: William Burke
- Manager: Patsy Durnin

Provincial Champions
- Munster: Waterford
- Leinster: Kilkenny
- Ulster: Antrim
- Connacht: Not Played

Championship Statistics
- Top Scorer: Paul Flynn (3-21)

The 1994 All-Ireland Under-21 Hurling Championship was the 31st staging of the All-Ireland Under-21 Hurling Championship since its establishment by the Gaelic Athletic Association in 1964. The championship began on 28 May 1994 and ended on 11 September 1994.

Galway were the defending champions.

On 11 September 1994, Kilkenny won the championship following a 3–10 to 0–11 defeat of Galway in the All-Ireland final. This was their sixth All-Ireland title overall and their first title since 1990.

Waterford's Paul Flynn was the championship's top scorer with 3-21.

== Results ==
=== Leinster Under-21 Hurling Championship ===
Quarter-finals

15 June 1994 Quarter-final	Meath	0-10 - 2-17	Kilkenny	St. Loman's Park, Trim
	M Cole 0-3, D Curtis 0-3, J McGuinness 0-2, J Sheridan 0-2.		R Shortall 1-6, B McEvoy 1-2, D Byrne 0-4, D Maher 0-2, P Barry 0-1, J Hickey 0-1, PJ Delaney 0-1.	Referee: A Murray (Westmeath)

5 July 1994 Quarter-final	Wexford	3-17 - 0-07	Offaly	Nowlan Park, Kilkenny
	M Morrissey 2-1, T Kavanagh 0-5, P Murphy 0-4, S Ryan 1-0, P Byrne 0-2, P Finn 0-2, E Furlong 0-1, K Lacey 0-1, R McCarthy 0-1.		J Coakley 0-2, P Kelly 0-2, K Martin 0-1, C McClone 0-1, P Bracken 0-1.

Semi-finals

6 July 1994 Semi-final	Kilkenny	4-10 - 2-09	Laois	Dr. Cullen Park, Carlow
	D Byrne 3-1, D Maher 1-1, PJ Delaney 0-3, P Barry 0-1, J Hickey 0-1, S Dollard 0-1, B Leahy 0-1, B McEvoy 0-1.		D Cuddy 1-5, L Tynan 1-0, P Cuddihy 0-2, F Sullivan 0-1, B McEvoy 0-1.	Referee: C Byrne (Wicklow)

19 July 1994 Semi-final	Wexford	4-15 - 2-12	Dublin	Nowlan Park, Kilkenny
	M Morrissey 2-0, T Kavanagh 0-7, J Byrne 1-2, P Finn 0-5, P Murphy 1-0, M Byrne 0-1.		B O'Brien 0-8, K O'Donoghue 2-0, L Walsh 0-1, P Harney 0-1, G Ennis 0-1, J Pardy 0-1.	Referee: P Dunphy (Kilkenny)

Final

26 July 1994 Final	Kilkenny	1-14 - 0-15	Wexford	Dr. Cullen Park, Carlow
	D Maher 1-1, R Shortall 0-4, B Ryan 0-3, PJ Delaney 0-2, O O'Connor 0-2, P Larkin 0-1, D Byrne 0-1.		T Kavanagh 0-3, M Byrne 0-3, C Roche 0-2, P Finn 0-2, J Byrne 0-1, P Murphy 0-1, M Morrissey 0-1, E Furlong 0-1, S Ryan 0-1.	Attendance: 5,500; Referee: P Horan (Offaly)

=== Munster Under-21 Hurling Championship ===
Quarter-finals

30 June 1994 Quarter-final	Clare	0-13 - 1-06	Kerry	Cusack Park, Ennis
	J Healy 0-8, F Hegarty 0-4, S McNamara 0-1.		K O'Sullivan 1-1, P O'Connell 0-2, O Diggins 0-2, B O'Sullivan 0-1.	Referee: T Lyons (Limerick)

30 June 1994 Quarter-final	Limerick	2-13 - 1-16	Tipperary	Gaelic Grounds, Limerick
	J Moran 0-6, S O'Neill 1-1, J Moran 1-1, M Wallace 0-2, R Fenton 0-1, O O'Neill 0-1, TJ Ryan 0-1.		J Doughan 1-4, T Dunne 0-5, R Tomlinson 0-2, D Burke 0-2, G Maguire 0-2, L Maguire 0-1.	Referee: W Horgan (Cork)

14 July 1994 Quarter-final replay	Tipperary	2-15 - 2-08	Limerick	Semple Stadium, Thurles
	D Burke 2-1, K Tucker 0-4, B O'Meara 0-3, J Doughan 0-3, G Maguire 0-2, R Tomlinson 0-1, T Dunne 0-1.		JA Moran 1-2, M Wallace 1-0, TJ Ryan 0-2, M Foley 0-2, S O'Neill 0-1, J Moran 0-1.	Referee: W Horgan (Cork)

Semi-finals

27 July 1994 Semi-final	Clare	3-13 - 2-10	Cork	Gaelic Grounds, Limerick
	E Taaffe 2-1, F Hegarty 1-4, S McNamara 0-4, D Chaplin 0-1, D McMahon 0-1, O Baker 0-1, S O'Hara 0-1.		B Corcoran 1-7, K Morrison 1-0, A Browne 0-2, I Ronan 0-1.	Referee: J McDonnell (Tipperary)

27 July 1994 Semi-final	Waterford	2-16 - 2-08	Tipperary	Walsh Park, Waterford
	P Flynn 2-11, F O'Shea 0-3, T Cronin 0-1, T Browne 0-1.		D Burke 1-1, R Tomlinson 1-0, J Doughan 0-3, B O'Meara 0-2, D Hogan 0-1, K Tucker 0-1.	Referee: G Harrington (Cork)

Final

3 August 1994 Final	Waterford	1-12 - 0-12	Clare	Páirc Mac Gearailt, Fermoy
	P Flynn 1-6, T Browne 0-3, A Kirwan 0-2, C Walsh 0-1.		S McNamara 0-5, F Hegarty 0-2, E Taaffe 0-2, S McMahon 0-1, R O'Hara 0-1, B Madden 0-1.	Referee: J McDonald (Tipperary)

=== Ulster Under-21 Hurling Championship ===
Semi-final

28 May 1994 Semi-final	Antrim	4-18 - 0-10	Tyrone	Fr. Healy Park

Final

12 June 1994 Final	Antrim	1-20 - 1-04	Down	Casement Park

=== All-Ireland Under-21 Hurling Championship ===
Semi-finals

13 August 1994 Semi-final	Galway	1-18 - 0-06	Antrim	Parnell Park, Dublin
	D Coen 0-7, M Headd 1-2, J McGrath 0-3, D Coleman 0-2, F Forde 0-2, N Shaughnessy 0-2.		A Mort 0-3, M McClafferty 0-2, P Montgomery 0-1.	Referee: P Aherne (Carlow)

21 August 1994 Semi-final	Kilkenny	2-21 - 3-06	Waterford	Semple Stadium, Thurles
	PJ Delaney 1-4, B McEvoy 0-6, B Ryan 1-2, D Byrne 0-4, D Maher 0-3, P Barry 0-1, S Dollard 0-1.		E Crowley 2-0, P Foley 1-1, P Flynn 0-4, T Browne 0-1.	Referee: T Murray (Limerick)

Final

11 September 1994 Final	Kilkenny	3-10 - 0-11	Galway	O'Connor Park, Tullamore
	PJ Delaney 1-3, R Shortall 1-1, B Ryan 1-0, D Maher 0-2, B McEvoy 0-1, S Dollard 0-1, D Byrne 0-1, O O'Connor 0-1.		D Coen 0-4, C O'Doherty 0-2, F Forde 0-2, P Kelly 0-2, O Fahy 0-1.	Referee: P Horan (Offaly)

== Championship statistics ==
=== Top scorers ===
Overall

Rank	Player	Club	Tally	Total	Matches	Average
1	Paul Flynn	Waterford	3-21	30	3	10.00
2	Denis Byrne	Kilkenny	3-11	20	5	4
3	PJ Delaney	Kilkenny	2-13	19	5	3.8
3	Robert Shortall	Kilkenny	2-11	17	5	3.40

=== Miscellaneous ===
- A 68-year-old Galway fan collapsed and died at the All-Ireland final.
