= 1983 All-Ireland Under-21 Hurling Championship final =

1983 All-Ireland Under-21 Hurling Championship Final
- Event: 1983 All-Ireland Under-21 Hurling Championship
Galway	Tipperary
0-12	1-6
- Date: 11 September 1983
- Venue: O'Connor Park, Tullamore
- Referee: Michael Kelleher (Kildare)

The 1983 All-Ireland Under-21 Hurling Championship final was a hurling match that was played at O'Connor Park, Tullamore on 11 September 1983 to determine the winners of the 1983 All-Ireland Under-21 Hurling Championship, the 19th season of the All-Ireland Under-21 Hurling Championship, a tournament organised by the Gaelic Athletic Association for the champion teams of the four provinces of Ireland. The final was contested by Galway of Connacht and Tipperary of Munster, with Galway winning by 0-12 to 1-6.

The All-Ireland final between Galway and Tipperary was the ninth championship meeting between the two teams and their sixth in an All-Ireland final including one replay. Galway were appearing in their second successive final having been defeated by Cork in 1982, while Tipperary were appearing in their fifth final in six years.

Galway's All-Ireland victory was their first since 1978. The win gave them their third All-Ireland title overall and put them in joint third position with Kilkenny on the all time roll of honour.

Tipperary's All-Ireland defeat was their third ever and their first since last winning the title in 1981.

== Match ==
=== Details ===
11 September 1983

Galway	0-12 – 1-6	Tipperary
A Moylan 0-3, A Staunton 0-3, M Coleman 0-1, M Costello 0-1, G Burke 0-1, J Murphy 0-1, M McGrath 0-1, T Keady 0-1.		A Browne 1-1, M McGrath 0-2, G O'Neill 0-1, C Donovan 0-1, P Kenny 0-1.

O'Connor Park, Tullamore
Referee: M Kelleher (Kildare)
