= 2011 All-Ireland Under-21 Hurling Championship final =

2011 All-Ireland Under-21 Hurling Championship Final
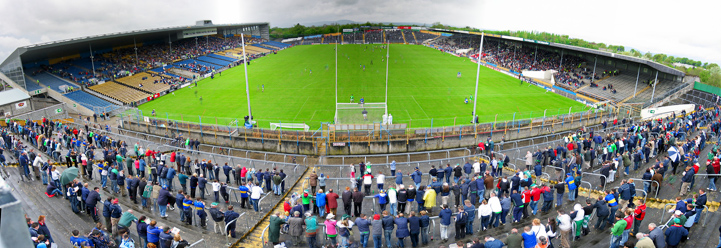
- Event: 2011 All-Ireland Under-21 Hurling Championship
Galway	Dublin
3-14	1-10
- Date: 10 September 2011
- Venue: Semple Stadium, Thurles
- Man of the Match: Davy Glennon
- Referee: Tony Carroll (Offaly)
- Attendance: 46,230

The 2011 All-Ireland Under-21 Hurling Championship final was a hurling match that was played at Semple Stadium, Thurles on 10 September 2011 to determine the winners of the 2011 All-Ireland Under-21 Hurling Championship, the 48th season of the All-Ireland Under-21 Hurling Championship, a tournament organised by the Gaelic Athletic Association for the champion teams of the four provinces of Ireland. The final was contested by Galway of Connacht and Dublin of Leinster, with Galway winning by 3-14 to 1-10.

The All-Ireland final between Galway and Dublin was the third All-Ireland final meeting between the two teams. Galway were hoping to win their first title since 2007 and their tenth over all. Dublin were hoping to win their first All-Ireland title.

After three minutes Dublin's Thomas Connolly was gifted a goal when Galway 'keeper Jamie Ryan's clearance only found the Dublin forward who blasted to the net. Galway forged ahead in the 11th minute when Tadhg Haran drilled a penalty to the net after Barry Daly had been hauled down by Ger McManus. Dublin were level by the 23rd minute, thanks to points from Kevin O'Loughlin and Niall McMorrow. The Galway forwards scored 2-2 in the space of six minutes to open up an eight-point lead at the end of the half. David Burke’s pass sent Davy Glennon in for a 28th-minute goal. Two minutes later James Regan flew past three defenders to net a wonderful individual effort to give Galway a 3-6 to 1-4 interval lead.

Galway refused to allow the Dubs to play their way back into the game after the restart. O’Loughlin tagged on another couple of frees, and substitute Robbie McMahon hit two points. Niall Burke powered over two frees to keep daylight between the sides. Galway finished the job off with two late points from David Burke.

Galway's All-Ireland victory was their third in seven years. The win gave them their tenth All-Ireland title over all and put them in third position on the all-time roll of honour.

Dublin's All-Ireland defeat was their fourth since first contesting a final in 1967. They remain a team who has contested All-Ireland deciders but has never claimed the ultimate prize.

== Match ==
=== Details ===
10 September 2011

Galway	3-14 - 1-10	Dublin
T Haran (1-03, 1-00 pen), J Regan (1-02), D Glennon (1-02), D Burke (0-03, 1f), N Burke (0-03, 2f), B Daly (0-01)		T Connolly (1-02, 0-02f), K O'Loughlin (0-05, 5f), R McMahon (0-02), N McMorrow (0-01).

Semple Stadium, Thurles
Attendance: 5,300
Referee: T Carroll (Offaly)

Galway	Dublin
