= Austin Murphy (hurler) =

Irish hurler

Personal information
- Nickname: Aussie
- Born: 1985 (age 40–41) Clara, County Kilkenny, Ireland
- Occupation: Insurance broker
- Height: 6 ft 1 in (185 cm)

Sport
- Sport: Hurling
- Position: Centre-forward
Club
- Years: Club
- Clara
Club titles
- Kilkenny titles: 2
College
- Years: College
- Limerick Institute of Technology
College titles
- Fitzgibbon titles: 2
Inter-county
Years	County	Apps (scores)
2006	Kilkenny	0 (0-00)
Inter-county titles
- Leinster titles: 1
- All-Irelands: 1
- NHL: 1
- All Stars: 0

Austin Murphy (born 1985) is an Irish former hurler. At club level he played with Clara and was also a member of the Kilkenny senior hurling team. He usually lined out at midfield or as a forward.

== Career ==
Murphy first came to prominence at juvenile and underage levels with the Clara club before eventually joining the club's top adult team. After being part of the club's All-Ireland Club Championship-winning team at intermediate level in 2013, he went on to win County Senior Championship titles in 2013 and 2015. Murphy first appeared on the inter-county scene as part of the Kilkenny team that won the All-Ireland Minor Championship title in 2003, before later winning an All-Ireland Under-21 Championship title in 2006. He was still a member of the under-21 team when he was simultaneously included on the Kilkenny intermediate and senior teams. Murphy was a non-playing substitute when Kilkenny beat Cork in the 2006 All-Ireland final.

== Career statistics ==
Team	Year	National League			Leinster		All-Ireland		Total	
Team	Year	Division	Apps	Score	Apps	Score	Apps	Score	Apps	Score
Kilkenny	2006	Division 1B	1	0-01	0	0-00	0	0-00	1	0-01
Career total			1	0-01	0	0-00	0	0-00	1	0-01

== Honours ==
Limerick Institute of Technology

- Fitzgibbon Cup: 2005, 2007

Clara

- Kilkenny Senior Hurling Championship: 2013 (c), 2015
- All-Ireland Intermediate Club Hurling Championship: 2013
- Leinster Intermediate Club Hurling Championship: 2012
- Kilkenny Intermediate Hurling Championship: 2007, 2012

Kilkenny

- All-Ireland Senior Hurling Championship: 2006
- Leinster Senior Hurling Championship: 2006
- National Hurling League: 2006
- Walsh Cup: 2006
- Leinster Intermediate Hurling Championship: 2006
- All-Ireland Under-21 Hurling Championship: 2006
- Leinster Under-21 Hurling Championship: 2005, 2006
- All-Ireland Minor Hurling Championship: 2003
- Leinster Minor Hurling Championship: 2003
