= Barry Daly =

Barry Daly may refer to:

- Barry Daly (hurler)
- Barry Daly (rugby union)
