= 2009 All-Ireland Under-21 Hurling Championship final =

2009 All-Ireland Under-21 Hurling Championship Final
- Event: 2009 All-Ireland Under-21 Hurling Championship
Clare	Kilkenny
0-15	0-14
- Date: 13 September 2009
- Venue: Croke Park, Dublin
- Man of the Match: John Conlon
- Referee: Cathal McAllister (Cork)

The 2009 All-Ireland Under-21 Hurling Championship final was a hurling match that was played at Croke Park, Dublin on 13 September 2009 to determine the winners of the 2009 All-Ireland Under-21 Hurling Championship, the 46th season of the All-Ireland Under-21 Hurling Championship, a tournament organised by the Gaelic Athletic Association for the champion teams of the four provinces of Ireland. The final was contested by Clare of Munster and Kilkenny of Leinster, with Clare winning by 0-15 to 0-14.

The All-Ireland final between Clare and Kilkenny was the first championship meeting between the two sides. Kilkenny were hoping to retain the title and claim their 11th championship. Clare were hoping to win their first All-Ireland title.

Kilkenny started the brighter and scored first through Mark Kelly who tapped over with just a minute on the clock. Clare signalled their intent from that point on and raced into a 0-3 to 0-2 lead with Colin Ryan and Caimin Morey both finding their range early on. Clare built on that early lead and were in control for most of the opening half, with the influential Ryan claiming four further points before the interval to help his side to an 0-8 0-6 half-time lead.

Kilkenny charged out of the blocks in the second half, putting real pressure on Clare by hitting three points without answer from Richie Hogan, James Nolan and Colin Fennelly. With fifteen minutes remaining in the match Kilkenny were ahead by 0-12 to 0-10. Clare dug deep to rally late on, outscoring the Cats by five points to two with John Conlon claiming two superb points to help his side to their first major silverware since winning the minor and senior All-Ireland double in 1997.

Clare's All-Ireland victory was their first. They became the eighth team to win the All-Ireland title and put them in joint sixth position with Wexford and Waterford on the all-time roll of honour.

Kilkenny's defeat was a record-equaling tenth in an All-Ireland final.

== Match ==
=== Details ===
13 September 2009

Clare	0-15 - 0-14	Kilkenny
C Ryan 0-9 (8f, 1 '65), J Conlon 0-3, C O'Donovan 0-2, C Morey 0-1.	Report	R Hogan 0-5 (1f), M Kelly 0-3, J Nolan, C Fennelly, J Mulhall 0-2 each.

Croke Park, Dublin
Referee: C McAllister (Cork)

Clare	Kilkenny
