= James Logue =

James Logue may refer to:

- James Washington Logue (1863–1925), U.S. Representative from Pennsylvania
- Jim Logue (James Brian Logue, born 1939), American ice hockey goaltender
- James Logue (hurler) (born 1989), Irish hurler
