= 2013 Kilkenny Senior Hurling Championship =

Annual hurling competition season

- Dates: 14 September 2013 – 17 October 2013
- Teams: 12
- Sponsor: St. Canice's Credit Union
- Champions: Clara (2nd title); Austin Murphy (captain); Michael Purcell (manager)
- Runners-up: Carrickshock
- Relegated: Graigue-Ballycallan

Tournament statistics
- Matches played: 12
- Top scorer(s): Mark Bergin (2-21)

The 2013 Kilkenny Senior Hurling Championship is the 119th staging of the Kilkenny Senior Hurling Championship since its establishment in 1887. The championship began on 14 September 2013 and ended on 27 October 2013.

Ballyhale Shamrocks were the defending champions, however, they were defeated in the semi-final stage. Clara won the title, following a 1–15 to 2–10 defeat of Carrickshock in the final.

== Team changes ==
=== To Championship ===
Promoted from the Kilkenny Intermediate Hurling Championship

- Clara

=== From Championship ===
Relegated to the Kilkenny Intermediate Hurling Championship

- Dunnamaggin

== Team summaries ==
| Team | Colours | Manager | Most recent success | | |
| Team | Colours | Manager | Senior | Inter. | Junior |
|---|---|---|---|---|---|
| Ballyhale Shamrocks | Green and white | Tommy Shefflin | 2010 | 1997 | 1973 |
| Carrickshock | Green and gold | Maurice Power | 1951 | 2004 | 1999 |
| Clara | Maroon and white | | 1986 | 2012 | 1977 |
| Danesfort | Black and amber | Liam Dowling | | 2011 | 2006 |
| Dicksboro | Maroon and white | Ger Henderson | 1993 | 2010 | 1919 |
| Erin's Own | Blue and white | David Buggy | | 2008 | 1958 |
| Fenians | Blue and white | | 1977 | | 1968 |
| Graigue-Ballycallan | Light blue and white | Tommy Bawle | 2000 | 1981 | 1985 |
| James Stephens | Green and red | Mark Tyrrell | 2011 | | 2000 |
| O'Loughlin Gaels | Green and white | Aidan Fogarty | 2010 | 1996 | 1995 |
| St. Martin's | Red and green | | 1984 | 2002 | |
| Tullaroan | Green and white | Declan Connolly | 1994 | 1988 | 1983 |

== Results ==
=== First round ===
| 14 September First round | St. Martin's | 1-18 - 0-12 | Danesfort | Polo Grounds, Jenkinstown |
| 14:00 | J Maher 0-7, C McGrath 1-1, E McGrath 0-3, J Mulhall 0-2, C Maher 0-2, T Breen 0-1, J Dowling 0-1, R Shore 0-1. | | R Hogan 0-7, C O'Neill 0-3, P Murphy 0-2. | Referee: E Ryan |

| 14 September First round | Tullaroan | 0-14 - 1-11 | O'Loughlin Gaels | John Locke Park, Callan |
| 16:00 | P Walsh 0-5, M Walsh 0-3, M Simpson 0-1, S Maher 0-1, K Coogan 0-1, M Walsh 0-1, J Coogan 0-1, D Dowling 0-1. | | M Bergin 1-7, M Comerford 0-2, M Kelly 0-1, A Geoghegan 0-1. | Referee: G Quilty (Slieverue) |

| 14 September First round | Erin's Own | 0-18 - 1-11 | Graigue-Ballycallan | St. John's Park, Kilkenny |
| 18:00 | M Boran 0-9, P O'Donovan 0-3, M Murphy 0-2, P Boran 0-2, A Moran 0-1, J Byrne 0-1. | | N Millea 0-7, E Brennan 1-2, PJ Trant 0-1, D Heafey 0-1. | Referee: E Hayes (Thomastown) |

| 14 September First round | Fenians | 1-14 - 1-16 | Dicksboro | Páirc Lachtáin, Freshford |
| 18:00 | C Tobin 0-5, W Brennan 1-1, M Webster 0-4, K Power 0-3, D Tobin 0-1. | | K Kenny 1-3, P O'Flynn 0-5, S Maher 0-4, C Buckley 0-2, D O'Gorman 0-1, O Walsh 0-1. | Referee: É Mansfield |

| 21 September First round replay | Tullaroan | 0-14 - 3-10 | O'Loughlin Gaels | Tom Ryall Park, Kilmanagh |
| 17:00 | M Walsh 0-8, P Walsh 0-2, T Walsh 0-2, J Coogan 0-1, M Walsh 0-1. | | M Kelly 3-2, M Bergin 0-6, N McEvoy 0-1. | Referee: R Dowling |

=== Relegation play-off ===
| 5 October 2013 Relegation play-off | Fenians | 0-18 - 1-14 | Graigue-Ballycallan | Palmerstown Sportsfield, Dicksboro |
| 13:30 | K Power (0-11); C Tobin (0-2); P Brennan, C Ryan, J Broderick, PJ Delaney, K Grehan (0-1 each). | Report | N Millea (1-8); E Brennan (0-2); D Walton, J Purcell, C Hoyne, V Teehan (0-1 each). | Referee: T Duggan |

=== Quarter-finals ===
| 29 September 2013 Quarter-final | Clara | 0-14 - 0-11 | Erin's Own | Páirc Lachtáin, Freshford |
| 12:30 | K Hogan 0-4, J Nolan 0-3, Lester Ryan 0-2, C Phelan 0-2, J Langton 0-1, Liam Ryan 0-1, K Phelan 0-1. | | M Boran 0-8, M Murphy 0-2, P O'Donovan 0-1. | Referee: G Quilty |

| 29 September 2013 Quarter-final | James Stephens | 1-16 - 2-14 | St. Martin's | Páirc Lachtáin, Freshford |
| 14:00 | E Larkin 0-14, D Cody 1-1, N Tyrrell 0-1. | | C McGrath 2-3, J Maher 0-7, J Mulhall 0-2, E McGrath 0-1, C Maher 0-1. | Referee: R Dowling (Kilmacow) |

| 29 September 2013 Quarter-final | Carrickshock | 0-17 - 1-08 | Dicksboro | Nowlan Park, Kilkenny |
| 15:45 | R Power 0-9, P Mulcahy 0-2, J Power 0-2, M Rohan 0-1, M O'Dwyer 0-1, B Donovan 0-1, D Walsh 0-1. | | C Buckley 1-1, O Walsh 0-2, M Gaffney 0-2, S Maher 0-2, P O'Flynn 0-1. | Referee: E Ryan (Fenians) |

| 29 September 2013 Quarter-final | Ballyhale Shamrocks | 1-21 - 1-17 | O'Loughlin Gaels | Nowlan Park |
| 17:15 | H Shefflin 0-8, C Fennelly 1-2, D Hoyne 0-2, M Aylward 0-2, E Reid 0-2, TJ Reid 0-2, J Fitzpatrick 0-1, R Corcoran 0-1, R Reid 0-1. | | M Bergin 1-8, J Nolan 0-2, M Comerford 0-2, C Bergin 0-2, P Butler 0-1, A Geoghegan 0-1, N McEvoy 0-1. | Referee: É Mansfield (Cloneen) |

=== Semi-finals ===
| 13 October 2013 Semi-final | St. Martin's | 1-14 - 1-17 | Clara | Nowlan Park, Kilkenny |
| 14:00 | J Maher (0-8, 0-6 frees); J Mulhall (0-4); C Maher (1-0); R Shore, D Breen (0-1 each). | Report | K Hogan (0-7, 0-5 frees); J Nolan (1-2); L Ryan (0-3); J Langton, C Prendergast (0-2 each); N Prendergast (0-1). | Referee: G Quilty |

| 13 October 2013 Semi-final | Ballyhale Shamrocks | 2-14 - 4-14 | Carrickshock | Nowlan Park, Kilkenny |
| 15:30 | H Shefflin 0-6 (4f); C Fennelly 1-2; TJ Reid 1-2 (0-1f); M Dermody, D Hoyne, M Aylward, J ‘Cha’ Fitzpatrick 0-1 each. | Report | M Rohan 1-3; J Power 1-2; R Power 0-5 (2f), B Donovan, N Rohan 1-0 each; M Rice 0-2; J Cahill, M O’Dwyer 0-1 each. | Referee: P Neary |

=== Final ===
| 27 October 2013 Final | Clara | 1-15 - 2-10 | Carrickshock | Nowlan Park, Kilkenny |
| 15:00 | K Hogan (0-10, 7 frees, 2 65s); Lester Ryan (1-1, 1-0 free); J Langton, A Murphy, Liam Ryan, C Bolger (0-1 each). | https://www.irishexaminer.com/sport/gaa/arid-20247658.html Report] | B Donovan (1-2); John Power (1-1); R Power (0-4, frees); M Rice (0-2); D Walsh (0-1). | Attendance: 8,648; Referee: S Cleere |

== Championship statistics ==
=== Top scorers ===
Top scorers overall

| Rank | Player | Club | Tally | Total | Matches | Average |
|---|---|---|---|---|---|---|
| 1 | Mark Bergin | O'Loughlin Gaels | 2-21 | 27 | 3 | 9.00 |
| 2 | John Maher | St. Martin's | 0-22 | 22 | 3 | 7.33 |
| 3 | Keith Hogan | Clara | 0-21 | 21 | 3 | 7.00 |
| 4 | Niall Millea | Graigue-Ballycallan | 1-15 | 18 | 2 | 9.00 |
| 4 | Richie Power | Carrickshock | 0-18 | 18 | 3 | 6.00 |
| 5 | Martin Boran | Erin's Own | 0-14 | 14 | 1 | 14.00 |
| 5 | Henry Shefflin | Erin's Own | 0-14 | 14 | 2 | 7.00 |
| 6 | Eoin Larkin | James Stephens | 0-14 | 14 | 1 | 14.00 |
| 6 | Kevin Power | Fenians | 0-14 | 14 | 2 | 7.00 |
| 7 | Colin McGrath | St. Martin's | 3-04 | 13 | 3 | 4.66 |

Top scorers in a single game

| Rank | Player | Club | Tally | Total | Opposition |
|---|---|---|---|---|---|
| 1 | Eoin Larkin | James Stephens | 0-14 | 14 | St. Martin's |
| 2 | Mark Kelly | O'Loughlin Gaels | 3-02 | 11 | Tullaroan |
| 2 | Mark Bergin | O'Loughlin Gaels | 1-08 | 11 | Ballyhale Shamrocks |
| 2 | Niall Millea | Graigue-Ballycallan | 1-08 | 11 | Fenians |
| 2 | Kevin Power | Fenians | 0-11 | 11 | Graigue-Ballycallan |
| 3 | Mark Bergin | O'Loughlin Gaels | 1-07 | 10 | Tullaroan |
| 3 | Keith Hogan | Clara | 0-10 | 10 | Carrickshock |
| 4 | Colin McGrath | St. Martin's | 2-03 | 9 | James Stephens |
| 4 | Martin Boran | Erin's Own | 0-09 | 9 | Graigue-Ballycallan |
| 4 | Richie Power | Carrickshock | 0-09 | 9 | Dicksboro |
