= 2000 All-Ireland Under-21 Hurling Championship final =

2000 All-Ireland Under-21 Hurling Championship Final
- Event: 2000 All-Ireland Under-21 Hurling Championship
Limerick	Galway
1-13	0-13
- Date: 17 September 2000
- Venue: Semple Stadium, Thurles
- Referee: Pat Horan (Offaly)

The 2000 All-Ireland Under-21 Hurling Championship final was a hurling match that was played at Semple Stadium, Thurles on 17 September 2000 to determine the winners of the 2000 All-Ireland Under-21 Hurling Championship, the 37th season of the All-Ireland Under-21 Hurling Championship, a tournament organised by the Gaelic Athletic Association for the champion teams of the four provinces of Ireland. The final was contested by Limerick of Munster and Galway of Connacht, with Limerick winning by 1-13 to 0-13.

== Match ==
=== Details ===
17 September 2000

Limerick	1-13 - 0-13	Galway
M Keane 1-8, D Sheehan 0-1, D Stapleton 0-1, S O'Connor 0-1, P O'Grady 0-1, S Lucey 0-1.		D Donoghue 0-6, E Donoghue 0-2, D Huban 0-1, S Donoghue 0-1, S Moran 0-1, D Hardiman 0-1, M Greaney 0-1.

Semple Stadium, Thurles
Referee: P Horan (Offaly)
