= 1973 All-Ireland Under-21 Hurling Championship final =

1973 All-Ireland Under-21 Hurling Championship Final
- Event: 1973 All-Ireland Under-21 Hurling Championship
Cork	Wexford
2-10	4-2
- Date: 11 November 1973
- Venue: Páirc Dáibhín, Carrick-on-Suir
- Referee: John Moloney (Tipperary)

The 1973 All-Ireland Under-21 Hurling Championship final was a hurling match that was played at Páirc Dáibhín, Carrick-on-Suir on 11 November 1973 to determine the winners of the 1973 All-Ireland Under-21 Hurling Championship, the 8th season of the All-Ireland Under-21 Hurling Championship, a tournament organised by the Gaelic Athletic Association for the champion teams of the four provinces of Ireland. The final was contested by Cork of Munster and Wexford of Leinster, with Cork winning by 2-10 to 4-2.

The All-Ireland final between Cork and Wexford was their eighth championship meeting. Cork were hoping to win their sixth title over all. Wexford were hoping to win their second All-Ireland title.

Cork's All-Ireland victory was their sixth in eighth years.

Wexford's run of bad luck in All-Ireland finals continued. After winning their sole title in 1965, defeat in 1973 marked their fifth loss in an All-Ireland decider since that victory.

== Match ==
=== Details ===
11 November 1973

Cork	2-10 – 4-2	Wexford
S O'Leary 0-5, T Fogarty 1-1, T Sheehan 1-0, P Kavanagh 0-3, J Barry-Murphy 0-1.		J Allen 2-0, N Walsh 1-0, S Storey 1-0, PJ Harris 0-2.

Páirc Dáibhín, Carrick-on-Suir
Referee: J Moloney (Tipperary)

Cork	Wexford
