= 1970 All-Ireland Under-21 Hurling Championship final =

- Event: 1970 All-Ireland Under-21 Hurling Championship
Cork	Wexford
Cork	Wexford
3-8	2-11
- Date: 11 October 1970
- Venue: Croke Park, Dublin
- Referee: Jim Dunphy (Waterford)

Replay
Cork	Wexford
5-17	0-8
- Date: 1 November 1970
- Venue: Croke Park, Dublin
- Referee: Jim Dunphy (Waterford)

The 1970 All-Ireland Under-21 Hurling Championship final was a hurling match played at Croke Park, Dublin on 11 October 1970 to determine the winners of the 1970 All-Ireland Under-21 Hurling Championship, the 7th season of the All-Ireland Under-21 Hurling Championship, a tournament organised by the Gaelic Athletic Association for the champion teams of the four provinces of Ireland. The final was contested by Cork of Munster and Wexford of Leinster, with the game ending in a 3-8 to 2-11 draw. The replay took place on 1 November 1970, with Cork winning by 5-17 to 0-8.

== Details ==
=== Drawn match ===
11 October 1970

Cork	3-8 - 2-11	Wexford
P Ring 2-2, S O'Leary 1-0, C Kelly 0-2, K McSweeney 0-2, S Murphy 0-1, S Looney 0-1.		M Butler 1-10, M Quigley 1-0, L Bennett 0-1.

Croke Park, Dublin
Referee: S Dunphy (Waterford)

=== Replay ===
1 November 1970

Cork	5-17 - 0-8	Wexford
C Kelly 2-7, P Ring 0-7, J Barrett 1-1, B Cummins 1-0, S O'Leary 1-0, P Moylan 0-1, J Horgan 0-1.		M Butler 0-4, M Casey 0-2, M Quigley 0-1, L Bennett 0-1.

Croke Park, Dublin
Referee: S Dunphy (Waterford)
