= 2005 All-Ireland Under-21 Hurling Championship final =

2005 All-Ireland Under-21 Hurling Championship Final
- Event: 2005 All-Ireland Under-21 Hurling Championship
Galway	Kilkenny
1-15	1-14
- Date: 18 September 2005
- Venue: Gaelic Grounds, Limerick
- Referee: John Sexton (Limerick)
- Attendance: 7,363

The 2005 All-Ireland Under-21 Hurling Championship final was a hurling match that was played at the Gaelic Grounds, Limerick on 18 September 2005 to determine the winners of the 2005 All-Ireland Under-21 Hurling Championship, the 42nd season of the All-Ireland Under-21 Hurling Championship, a tournament organised by the Gaelic Athletic Association for the champion teams of the four provinces of Ireland. The final was contested by Galway of Connacht and Kilkenny of Leinster, with Galway winning by 1-15 to 1-14.

The All-Ireland final between Galway and Kilkenny was their sixth meeting in a decider, including one replay. Galway were hoping to claim their 8th championship. Kilkenny, the reigning champions of the previous two years, were hoping to claim their 10th title and a hat-trick of titles for the first time in their history.

Galway led 1-7 to 1-6 at the break, with Eoin Larkin scoring all but one of Kilkenny's points. Aonghus Callanan scored Galway's goal in the 13th minute. Kilkenny looked certain winners as they went into the final six minutes armed with a 1-14 to 1-11 lead, however, they failed to score again. Galway cracked home the final four points, including two from 2004 minor-winner Kerril Wade, to clinch a one-point victory.

Galway's All-Ireland victory was their first since 1996. The victory put them in joint third position with Tipperary on the all-time roll of honour.

== Match ==
=== Details ===
18 September 2005

Galway	1-15 - 1-14	Kilkenny
K Wade (0-8, five frees, one 65), A Callanan (1-1), K Burke (0-2), D Collins (0-1, free), B Lucas (0-1), N Healy (0-1), C Dervan (0-1).	Report	E Larkin (1-9, eight points frees), J Fitzpatrick (0-2), M Fennelly (0-1), W O'Dwyer (0-1), E Reid (0-1).

Gaelic Grounds, Limerick
Attendance: 7,363
Referee: J Sexton (Limerick)
