= 1993 All-Ireland Under-21 Hurling Championship final =

- Event: 1993 All-Ireland Under-21 Hurling Championship
Galway	Kilkenny
Galway	Kilkenny
2-14	3-11
- Referee: John McDonnell (Tipperary)

Replay
Galway	Kilkenny
2-9	3-3
- Referee: John McDonnell (Tipperary)

The 1993 All-Ireland Under-21 Hurling Championship final was a hurling match played to determine the winners of the 1993 All-Ireland Under-21 Hurling Championship, the 30th season of the All-Ireland Under-21 Hurling Championship, a tournament organised by the Gaelic Athletic Association for the champion teams of the four provinces of Ireland. The final was contested by Galway of Connacht and Kilkenny of Leinster, with the game ending in a 2-14 to 3-11 draw. Galway won the replay by 2-9 to 3-3

== Details ==
=== Drawn match ===
12 September 1993

Galway	2-14 - 3-11	Kilkenny
M Headd 1-3, L Burke 1-1, F Forde 0-4, D Coleman 0-2, J McGrath 0-2, T Kirwan 0-1, P Kelly 0-1.		D Lawlor 1-5, C Brennan 1-3, M Owens 1-0, P Farrell 0-3.

O'Connor Park, Tullamore
Referee: J McDonnell (Tipperary)

=== Replay ===
3 October 1993

Galway	2-9 - 3-3	Kilkenny
M Headd 1-3, F Forde 1-3, T Kirwan 0-1, C O'Doherty 0-1, M Kearns 0-1.		D Lawlor 1-2, PJ Delaney 1-0, P Hennessy 1-0, C Brennan 0-1.

O'Connor Park, Tullamore
Referee: J McDonnell (Tipperary)
