= 1971 All-Ireland Under-21 Hurling Championship final =

1971 All-Ireland Under-21 Hurling Championship Final
- Event: 1971 All-Ireland Under-21 Hurling Championship
Cork	Wexford
7-8	1-11
- Date: 12 September 1971
- Venue: Walsh Park, Waterford
- Referee: Paddy Buggy (Kilkenny)

The 1971 All-Ireland Under-21 Hurling Championship final was a hurling match that was played at Walsh Park, Waterford on 12 September 1971 to determine the winners of the 1971 All-Ireland Under-21 Hurling Championship, the 8th season of the All-Ireland Under-21 Hurling Championship, a tournament organised by the Gaelic Athletic Association for the champion teams of the four provinces of Ireland. The final was contested by Cork of Munster and Wexford of Leinster, with Cork winning by 7-8 to 1-11.

The All-Ireland final between Cork and Wexford was their seventh championship meeting. Cork were hoping to win their fifth title over all and an unprecedented fourth All-Ireland title in-a-row. Wexford were hoping to win their second All-Ireland title.

Cork's All-Ireland victory was their fifth in six years. The victory also secured a fourth successive All-Ireland title, a record which still stands.

Wexford's run of bad luck in All-Ireland finals continued. After winning their sole title in 1965, defeat in 1971 marked their fourth loss in an All-Ireland decider since that victory.

== Match ==
=== Details ===
12 September 1971

Cork	7-8 – 1-11	Wexford
J Rothwell 4-0, S O'Leary 2-4, B Cummins 1-0, P Kavanagh 0-2, K McSweeney 0-1, M Malone 0-1.		M Butler 1-2, M Casey 0-3, L Bennett 0-2, T Byrne 0-2, J Russell 0-1, B Dunne 0-1.

Walsh Park, Waterford
Referee: P Buggy (Kilkenny)

Cork	Wexford
