= 1994 All-Ireland Under-21 Hurling Championship final =

1994 All-Ireland Under-21 Hurling Championship Final
- Event: 1994 All-Ireland Under-21 Hurling Championship
Kilkenny	Galway
3-10	0-11
- Venue: O'Connor Park, Tullamore
- Referee: Pat Horan (Offaly)

The 1994 All-Ireland Under-21 Hurling Championship final was a hurling match that was played to determine the winners of the 1994 All-Ireland Under-21 Hurling Championship, the 31st season of the All-Ireland Under-21 Hurling Championship, a tournament organised by the Gaelic Athletic Association for the champion teams of the four provinces of Ireland. The final was contested by Kilkenny of Leinster and Galway of Connacht, with Kilkenny winning by 3–10 to 0–11.

== Match ==
=== Details ===
11 September 1994

Kilkenny	3-10 - 0-11	Galway
PJ Delaney 1-3, R Shorthall 1-1, B Ryan 1-0, D Maher 0-3, O O'Connor 0-1, D Byrne 0-1, S Dollard 0-1.		D Coen 0-5, P Kelly 0-2, F Forde 0-2, O Fahy 0-1, C O'Doherty 0-1.

O'Connor Park, Tullamore
Referee: P Horan (Offaly)
