= 1986 All-Ireland Under-21 Hurling Championship final =

1986 All-Ireland Under-21 Hurling Championship Final
- Event: 1986 All-Ireland Under-21 Hurling Championship
Galway	Wexford
0-14	2-5
- Referee: Gerry Long (Tipperary)

The 1986 All-Ireland Under-21 Hurling Championship final was a hurling match that was played to determine the winners of the 1986 All-Ireland Under-21 Hurling Championship, the 22nd season of the All-Ireland Under-21 Hurling Championship, a tournament organised by the Gaelic Athletic Association for the champion teams of the four provinces of Ireland. The final was contested by Galway of Connacht and Wexford of Leinster, with Galway winning by 0-14 to 2-5.
