= 1969 All-Ireland Under-21 Hurling Championship final =

1969 All-Ireland Under-21 Hurling Championship Final
- Event: 1969 All-Ireland Under-21 Hurling Championship
Cork	Wexford
5-13	4-7
- Date: 14 September 1969
- Venue: Walsh Park, Waterford
- Referee: Paddy Johnston (Kilkenny)

The 1969 All-Ireland Under-21 Hurling Championship final was a hurling match that was played at Walsh Park, Waterford on 12 September 1969 to determine the winners of the 1969 All-Ireland Under-21 Hurling Championship, the 6th season of the All-Ireland Under-21 Hurling Championship, a tournament organised by the Gaelic Athletic Association for the champion teams of the four provinces of Ireland. The final was contested by Cork of Munster and Wexford of Leinster, with Cork winning by 5-13 to 4-7.

The All-Ireland final between Cork and Wexford was their fourth championship meeting. Cork were hoping to win their third title over all and become the first team to retain the title. Wexford were hoping to win their second All-Ireland title.

Cork's All-Ireland victory was their third in four years. They also became the first team to retain the All-Ireland title.

Wexford's run of bad luck in All-Ireland finals continued. After winning their sole title in 1965, defeat in 1969 marked their second loss in an All-Ireland decider since that victory.

== Match ==
=== Details ===
14 September 1969

Cork	5-13 – 4-7	Wexford
R Cummins 2-4, B Meade 0-5, W Walsh 1-1, S Murphy 1-1, B Cummins 1-0, F Keane 0-1, P Moylan 0-1.		M Butler 2-0, T Royce 1-3, M Dalton 1-0, N Buggy 0-3, M Quigley 0-1.

Walsh Park, Waterford
Referee: P Johnston (Kilkenny)

Cork	Wexford
