= 1981 All-Ireland Under-21 Hurling Championship final =

1981 All-Ireland Under-21 Hurling Championship Final
- Event: 1981 All-Ireland Under-21 Hurling Championship
Tipperary	Kilkenny
2-16	1-10
- Date: 13 September 1981
- Venue: Walsh Park, Waterford
- Referee: Nealie Duggan (Limerick)

The 1981 All-Ireland Under-21 Hurling Championship final was a hurling match that was played at Walsh Park, Waterford on 13 September 1981 to determine the winners of the 1981 All-Ireland Under-21 Hurling Championship, the 18th season of the All-Ireland Under-21 Hurling Championship, a tournament organised by the Gaelic Athletic Association for the champion teams of the four provinces of Ireland. The final was contested by Tipperary of Munster and Kilkenny of Leinster, with Tipperary winning by 2-16 to 1-10.

Tipperary's All-Ireland victory was their third in-in-row. The win gave them their fifth All-Ireland title over all.

Kilkenny's All-Ireland defeat was their second in succession

== Match ==
=== Details ===
13 September 1981

Tipperary	2-16 – 1-10	Kilkenny
D O'Connell 2-1, G O'Neill 0-6, M McGrath 0-5, N English 0-2, B Ryan 0-1, P McGrath 0-1.		B Walton 1-7, MJ Ryan 0-1, M Byrne 0-1, P Gannon 0-1.

Walsh Park, Waterford
Referee: N Duggan (Limerick)
