= 1999 All-Ireland Under-21 Hurling Championship final =

1999 All-Ireland Under-21 Hurling Championship Final
- Event: 1999 All-Ireland Under-21 Hurling Championship
Kilkenny	Galway
1-13	0-14
- Date: 19 September 1999
- Venue: O'Connor Park, Tullamore
- Referee: Ger Harrington (Cork)

The 1999 All-Ireland Under-21 Hurling Championship final was a hurling match that was played at O'Connor Park, Tullamore on 19 September 1999 to determine the winners of the 1999 All-Ireland Under-21 Hurling Championship, the 36th season of the All-Ireland Under-21 Hurling Championship, a tournament organised by the Gaelic Athletic Association for the champion teams of the four provinces of Ireland. The final was contested by Kilkenny of Leinster and Galway of Connacht, with Kilkenny winning by 1-13 to 0-14.

== Match ==
=== Details ===
19 September 1999

Kilkenny	1-13 - 0-14	Galway
H Shefflin 0-8, E Brennan 1-0, M Gordon 0-2, J O'Neill 0-1, JP Corcoran 0-1, K Power 0-1.		E Cloonan 0-8, E Linnane 0-1, D O'Shaughnessy 0-1, E Tannian 0-1, M Kerins 0-1, E Donoghue 0-1, D Donoghue 0-1.

O'Connor Park, Tullamore
Referee: G Harrington (Cork)
