= 2003 All-Ireland Under-21 Hurling Championship final =

2003 All-Ireland Under-21 Hurling Championship Final
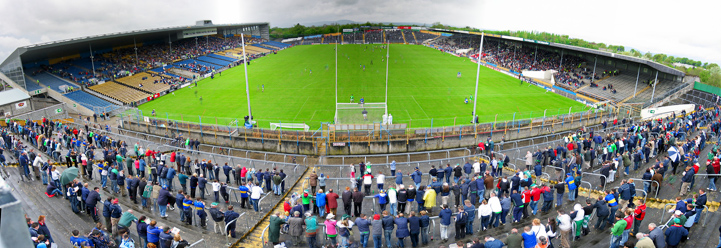
- Event: 2003 All-Ireland Under-21 Hurling Championship
Kilkenny	Galway
2-13	0-12
- Date: 21 September 2003
- Venue: Semple Stadium, Thurles
- Referee: Michael Wadding (Waterford)

The 2003 All-Ireland Under-21 Hurling Championship final was a hurling match that was played at Semple Stadium, Thurles on 21 September 2003 to determine the winners of the 2003 All-Ireland Under-21 Hurling Championship, the 40th season of the All-Ireland Under-21 Hurling Championship, a tournament organised by the Gaelic Athletic Association for the champion teams of the four provinces of Ireland. The final was contested by Kilkenny of Leinster and Galway of Connacht, with Kilkenny winning by 2-13 to 0-12.

== Match ==
=== Details ===
21 September 2003

Kilkenny	2-13 - 0-12	Galway
C Phelan (1-4), A Fogarty (1-1), S Hennessy (0-4, all frees), T Walsh (0-2), P Cleere (0-1), B Dowling (0-1).	Report	G Farragher (0-7, all frees), N Healy (0-2), K Brady (0-2), JP O'Connell (0-1).

Semple Stadium, Thurles
Referee: M Wadding (Waterford)
