= 1996 All-Ireland Under-21 Hurling Championship final =

1996 All-Ireland Under-21 Hurling Championship Final
- Event: 1996 All-Ireland Under-21 Hurling Championship
Galway	Wexford
1-14	0-7
- Date: 8 September 1996
- Referee: Pat O'Connor (Limerick)

The 1996 All-Ireland Under-21 Hurling Championship final was a hurling match that was played on 8 September 1996 to determine the winners of the 1996 All-Ireland Under-21 Hurling Championship, the 33rd season of the All-Ireland Under-21 Hurling Championship, a tournament organised by the Gaelic Athletic Association for the champion teams of the four provinces of Ireland. The final was contested by Galway of Connacht and Wexford of Leinster, with Galway winning by 1-14 to 0-7.

== Match ==
=== Details ===
8 September 1996

Galway	1-14 - 0-7	Wexford
K Broderick 1-2, A Kerins 0-4, D Coen 0-4, D Moran 0-2, F Healy 0-1, C Moore 0-1.		P Codd 0-5, G Laffan 0-2.

Semple Stadium, Thurles
Referee: P O'Connor (Limerick)
