= 1991 All-Ireland Under-21 Hurling Championship final =

1991 All-Ireland Under-21 Hurling Championship Final
- Event: 1991 All-Ireland Under-21 Hurling Championship
Galway	Offaly
2-17	1-9
- Date: 8 September 1991
- Venue: Gaelic Grounds, Limerick
- Referee: Terence Murray (Limerick)

The 1991 All-Ireland Under-21 Hurling Championship final was a hurling match that was played on 8 September 1991 to determine the winners of the 1991 All-Ireland Under-21 Hurling Championship, the 28th season of the All-Ireland Under-21 Hurling Championship, a tournament organised by the Gaelic Athletic Association for the champion teams of the four provinces of Ireland. The final was contested by Galway of Connacht and Offaly of Leinster, with Galway winning by 2-17 to 1-9.

== Match ==
=== Details ===
8 September 1991

Galway	2-17 - 1-9	Offaly
L Burke 1-2, T O'Brien 0-4, C Moran 0-4, J Campbell 1-0, J Rabbitte 0-3, M Curtin 0-1, B Larkin 0-1, B Keogh 0-1.		J Dooley 1-5, A Cahill 0-1, J Troy 0-1, J Pilkington 0-1, P Temple 0-1.

Gaelic Grounds, Limerick
Referee: T Murray (Limerick)
