= James Logue (hurler) =

Irish hurler

Personal information
- Native name: Séamus Ó Laoghóg (Irish)
- Born: 1989 (age 36–37) Ballingarry, County Tipperary, Ireland
- Occupation: Business development manager
- Height: 6 ft 1 in (185 cm)

Sport
- Sport: Hurling
- Position: Goalkeeper
Club
- Years: Club
- Ballingarry
Club titles
- Tipperary titles: 0
Inter-county*
Years	County	Apps (scores)
2014 2015	Tipperary; Kerry	0 (0-00)
Inter-county titles
- Munster titles: 3
- All-Irelands: 5
- NHL: 1
- All Stars: 0
- *Inter County team apps and scores correct as of 19:01, 16 January 2015.

James Logue (born 1989) is an Irish hurler who previously lined out with the Tipperary and Kerry senior teams.

Born in Ballingarry, County Tipperary, Logue first played competitive hurling during his schooling at Presentation Secondary School Ballingarry. He arrived on the inter-county scene at the age of seventeen when he first linked up with the Tipperary minor team, before later joining the under-21 and intermediate sides. Logue was ever present in the goal on these tipperary teams as all three teams gained all Ireland and munster success. He joined the senior panel during the 2014 championship. Logue remained as third-choice goalkeeper for the season. In December 2014 he joined the Kerry senior team for one season citing work commitments as the reason for this. he was part of the Kerry team that won the division 2a Hurling league and christy ring this season. At club level Logue remains ever present in goal for ballingarry since 2006. He has won many divisional south championships underage all in the forwards.

At club level Logue plays with Ballingarry.

== Honours ==
=== Player ===
Tipperary, Ballingarry, Lit

- All-Ireland Intermediate Hurling Championship (1): 2012
- Munster Intermediate Hurling Championship (1): 2012
- All-Ireland Under-21 Hurling Championship (1): 2010
- Munster Under-21 Hurling Championship (1): 2010
- All-Ireland Minor Hurling Championship (1): 2007 Munster Minor Hurling Championship (1): 2007

South Tipperary Minor "a" hurling championship 2006, 2007 South Tipperary U21 "A" Hurling championship 2010 Ryan cup All Ireland colleges 2013 Fergal Maher all Ireland colleges 2012 Colleges All Ireland senior hurling league division 2 championship 2012
