= 1983 All-Ireland Under-21 Hurling Championship =

All-Ireland Under-21 Hurling Championship 1983
Championship Details
- Dates: 20 April 1983 – 11 September 1983

All Ireland Champions
- Winners: Galway (3rd win)
- Captain: Peter Casserley
- Manager: Michael Bond

All Ireland Runners-up
- Runners-up: Tipperary
- Captain: Denis Finnerty

Provincial Champions
- Munster: Tipperary
- Leinster: Laois
- Ulster: Down
- Connacht: Galway

The 1983 All-Ireland Under-21 Hurling Championship was the 20th staging of the All-Ireland Under-21 Hurling Championship since its establishment by the Gaelic Athletic Association in 1964. The championship began on 20 April 1983 and ended on 11 September 1983.

Cork were the defending champions, however, they were beaten by Clare in a Munster semi-final replay.

On 11 September 1983, Galway won the championship following a 0-12 to 1-6 defeat of Tipperary in the All-Ireland final. This was their third All-Ireland title in the under-21 grade and their first in five championship seasons.

== Results ==
=== Leinster Under-21 Hurling Championship ===
Final

17 July 1983 Final	Laois	3-14 – 4-8	Wexford	Croke Park

=== Munster Under-21 Hurling Championship ===
First round

20 April 1983 First round	Tipperary	4-15 - 2-05	Limerick	Semple Stadium, Thurles
	M McGrath 1-8, W Peters 2-1, P Kenny 1-2, J Hayes 0-1, L Bergin 0-1, G O'Neill 0-1, N Dooley 0-1.		A Garvey 1-5, M Quaid 1-0.	Referee: W Horgan (Cork)

20 April 1983 First round	Waterford	1-11 - 1-11	Cork	Fraher Field, Dungarvan
	M Walsh 0-6, P Curley 1-1, P Bennett 0-3, N Crowley 0-1.		T O'Connor 1-1, T Mulcahy 0-3, T O'Sullivan 0-3, K Kingston 0-2, D Curtin 0-1, M O'Donoghue 0-1.	Referee: W Barrett (Tipperary)

27 April 1983 First round replay	Cork	1-14 - 1-10	Clare	Páirc Uí Chaoimh, Cork
	T O'Sullivan 0-6, T Mulcahy 1-2, M O'Donoghue 0-3, P O'Connor 0-1, K Kingston 0-1, M McCarthy 0-1.		P Curley 1-1, K Delahunty 0-4, N Crowley 0-1, M Walsh 0-1, J Dalton 0-1, P Ryan 0-1, T Larkin 0-1.	Referee: W Barrett (Tipperary)

Semi-finals

4 May 1983 Semi-final	Kerry	0-02 - 2-20	Tipperary	Ardfert
			C O'Donovan 0-6, A Browne 1-1, W Peters 1-1, P Kenny 0-3, G O'Neill 0-3, V Dooley 0-3, D Finnerty 0-2, L Bergin 0-1.

13 July 1983 Semi-final	Clare	2-11 - 2-11	Cork	FitzGerald Park, Kilmallock
	V Donnellan 0-7, T Lynch 1-0, B Carroll 1-0, M Guilfoyle 0-2, B McNamara 0-1, PJ Moroney 0-1.		T O'Sullivan 0-8, T Mulcahy 1-0, T Finn 1-0, D Curtin 0-2, T McCarthy 0-1.

20 July 1983 Semi-final replay	Clare	2-15 - 2-12	Cork	FitzGerald Park, Kilmallock
	V Donnellan 0-7, J Lynch 1-3, D Chaplin 1-1, B McNamara 0-2, M Glynn 0-1, T Howard 0-1.		T O'Sullivan 0-6, T O'Connor 1-1, T Mulcahy 1-0, T Finn 0-1, T McCarthy 0-1, P Hartnett 0-1, D McCurtin 0-1, T Barry-Murphy 0-1.	Referee: N Duggan (Limerick)

Final

27 July 1983 Final	Clare	3-08 - 2-17	Tipperary	Cusack Park
	V Donnellan 0-7, B McNamara 1-0, T Howard 1-0, J Lynch 1-0, D Chaplin 0-1.		M McGrath 0-7, W Peters 0-5, G O'Neill 1-1, A Browne 1-0, P Kenny 0-2, C O'Donovan 0-2.

=== Ulster Under-21 Hurling Championship ===
Final

9 July 1983 Final	Down	2-7 – 0-7	Antrim	St. Patrick's Park

=== All-Ireland Under-21 Hurling Championship ===
Semi-finals

31 July 1983 Semi-final	Tipperary	1-16 – 3-7	Down	Geraldine Park

21 August 1983 Semi-final	Galway	2-10 – 1-7	Laois	Cusack Park

Final

11 September 1983 Final	Galway	0-12 – 1-6	Tipperary	O'Connor Park
	A Moylan 0-3, A Staunton 0-3, M Coleman 0-1, M Costello 0-1, G Burke 0-1, J Murphy 0-1, M McGrath 0-1, T Keady 0-1.		A Browne 1-1, M McGrath 0-2, G O'Neill 0-1, C Donovan 0-1, P Kenny 0-1.	Referee: M Kelleher (Kildare)

== Championship statistics ==
=== Miscellaneous ===
- Laois win the Leinster title for the first and, to date, the only time in their history.
- The All-Ireland semi-final clash between Laois and Galway remains their only ever championship meeting.
