= 1992 All-Ireland Under-21 Hurling Championship final =

- Event: 1992 All-Ireland Under-21 Hurling Championship
Waterford	Offaly
Waterford	Offaly
4-4	0-16
- Date: 13 September 1992
- Referee: Willie Barrett (Tipperary)

Replay
Waterford	Offaly
0-12	2-3
- Date: 27 September 1992
- Referee: Willie Barrett (Tipperary)

The 1992 All-Ireland Under-21 Hurling Championship final was a hurling match played on 13 September 1992 to determine the winners of the 1992 All-Ireland Under-21 Hurling Championship, the 29th season of the All-Ireland Under-21 Hurling Championship, a tournament organised by the Gaelic Athletic Association for the champion teams of the four provinces of Ireland. The final was contested by Waterford of Munster and Offaly of Leinster, with the game ending in a 4-4 to 0-16 draw. The replay took place on 27 September 1992, with Waterford winning by 0-12 to 2-3.

== Details ==
=== Drawn match ===
27 September 1992

Waterford	4-4 - 0-16	Offaly
S Daly 3-0, J Brenner 0-4, P Flynn 1-0.		J Dooley 0-6, S O'Farrell 0-3, B Whelehan 0-2, J Troy 0-2, S Grennan 0-1, M Gallagher 0-1, N Hand 0-1.

Nowlan Park
Referee: W Barrett (Tipperary)

=== Replay ===
27 September 1992
Final

Waterford	0-12 - 2-3	Offaly
P Flynn 0-5, S Daly 0-1, F Hartley 0-1, J Brenner 0-1, A Fitzgerald 0-1, M Hubbard 0-1, K McGrath 0-1, N Dalton 0-1.		J Troy 1-1, M Gallagher 1-0, J Dooley 0-2.

Nowlan Park
Referee: W Barrett (Tipperary)
