= 2002 All-Ireland Under-21 Hurling Championship final =

2002 All-Ireland Under-21 Hurling Championship Final
- Event: 2002 All-Ireland Under-21 Hurling Championship
Limerick	Galway
3-17	0-8
- Date: 15 September 2002
- Venue: Semple Stadium, Thurles
- Referee: Dickie Murphy (Wexford)

The 2002 All-Ireland Under-21 Hurling Championship final was a hurling match that was played at Semple Stadium, Thurles on 15 September 2002 to determine the winners of the 2002 All-Ireland Under-21 Hurling Championship, the 39th season of the All-Ireland Under-21 Hurling Championship, a tournament organised by the Gaelic Athletic Association for the champion teams of the four provinces of Ireland. The final was contested by Limerick of Munster and Galway of Connacht, with Limerick winning by 3-17 to 0-8.

== Match ==
=== Details ===
15 September 2002

Limerick	3-17 - 0-8	Galway
M Keane 1-6, A O'Shaughnessy 2-2, P Kirby 0-3, P Lawlor 0-2, J O'Brien 0-2, C Fitzgerald 0-1, D Reale 0-1.		G Farragher 0-5, R Murray 0-2, JP O'Connell 0-1.

Semple Stadium, Thurles
Referee: D Murphy (Wexford)
