= Mark Kelly (hurler) =

Irish hurler (born 1988)

Personal information
- Native name: Marc Ó Ceallaigh (Irish)
- Born: 2 September 1988 (age 38) Kilkenny, Ireland
- Occupation: Primary school teacher
- Height: 1.88 m (6 ft 2 in)

Sport
- Sport: Hurling
- Position: Full-forward
Club
- Years: Club
- 2006-present: O'Loughlin Gaels
Inter-county**
Years	County	Apps (scores)
2012-present	Kilkenny	5 (2-1)
Inter-county titles
- Leinster titles: 2
- All-Irelands: 3
- NHL: 1
- All Stars: 0
- **Inter County team apps and scores correct as of 14:48, 6 July 2015.

Mark Kelly (born 2 September 1988) is an Irish hurler/Athlete who played as a forward for the Kilkenny senior team 2012–16.

Born in Kilkenny, Kelly first played competitive hurling with his club O'Loughlin Gaels and holds Roinn A championship medals at u14, u16, minor and senior in recent years. During his schooling at Kilkenny CBS, Kelly won Leinster championship medals and starred in his school's run to the All-Ireland Colleges final in 2007 narrowly losing to Waterford's De La Salle. He arrived on the inter-county scene at the age of seventeen when he first linked up with the Kilkenny minor team before later joining the under-21 side. Kelly scored 3 points from play while hurling midfield in the u21 All-Ireland final in 2009 against Clare. He joined the senior panel during the 2012 championship after excelling with his club O'Loughlin Gaels. Kelly scored two goals on his first championship start against Offaly and became a more regular member of the team since then. He has won 3 All Ireland senior medals (2012, 2014, 2015) two Leinster medals, one National Hurling League medal, one u21 All Ireland medal, two u21 Leinster Championship medals and one Leinster minor medal during his county career.

== Playing career ==
=== Inter-county ===
Kelly first came to prominence on the inter-county scene as a member of the Kilkenny minor team in 2006. He won a Leinster medal that year following a heavy 4–22 to 1–5 defeat of Carlow.

Three years later and Kelly was a key member of the Kilkenny under-21 team. He won a Leinster medal that year as a brace of Jonjo Farrell goals helped Kilkenny to a 2–20 to 1–19 defeat of Dublin. Clare later faced Kilkenny in their first ever All-Ireland clash. A late point from midfielder Cormac O'Donovan gave Clare a narrow 0–15 to 0–14 victory.

Kelly was added to the senior team in 2012, however, he played no part in Kilkenny's successful All-Ireland campaign.

In 2014 Kelly won his first National Hurling League medal as Kilkenny secured a narrow one-point 2–25 to 1–27 extra-time victory over Tipperary. He later scored two goals on his championship debut on 7 June 2014 in a 5–32 to 1-18 Leinster quarter-final defeat of Offaly. Kelly was later confined to the substitutes' bench for Kilkenny's subsequent Leinster and All-Ireland victories.

Kelly won his first Leinster medal on the field of play in 2015 following a 1–25 to 2–15 defeat of Galway in the provincial decider.

== Honours ==
=== Player ===
Kilkenny

- All-Ireland Senior Hurling Championship (3): 2012, 2014, 2015
- Leinster Senior Hurling Championship (2): 2014 2015
- National Hurling League (1): 2014
- Leinster Under-21 Hurling Championship (1): 2009
- Leinster Minor Hurling Championship (1): 2006 (sub)
