= 1991 All-Ireland Under-21 Hurling Championship =

All-Ireland Under-21 Hurling Championship 1990
Championship Details
- Dates: 12 June 1991 – 8 September 1991
- Teams: 17

All Ireland Champions
- Winners: Galway (5th win)
- Captain: Brian Feeney

All Ireland Runners-up
- Runners-up: Offaly
- Captain: Johnny Pilkington

Provincial Champions
- Munster: Cork
- Leinster: Offaly
- Ulster: Antrim
- Connacht: Galway

Championship Statistics
- Top Scorer: Frankie Carroll (1-38)

The 1991 All-Ireland Under-21 Hurling Championship was the 28th staging of the All-Ireland Under-21 Hurling Championship since its establishment by the Gaelic Athletic Association in 1964. The championship began on 12 June 1991 and ended on 8 September 1991.

Kilkenny entered the championship as the defending champions, however, they were beaten by Offaly in the Leinster final.

On 8 September 1991, Galway won the championship following a 2–17 to 1–09 defeat of Offaly in the All-Ireland final. This was their fifth All-Ireland title overall and their first title since 1986.

Limerick's Frankie Carroll was the championship's top scorer with 1-38.

== Results ==
=== Leinster Under-21 Hurling Championship ===
Quarter-finals

12 June 1991 Quarter-final	Dublin	0-11 - 0-07	Laois	Geraldine Park, Athy
	P McManus 0-5, N Butler 0-5, D Hernan 0-1.		PJ Peacock 0-4, S Dooley 0-1, D Conroy 0-1, J Fogarty 0-1.	Referee: P Freaney (Kildare)

13 June 1991 Quarter-final	Offaly	2-23 - 2-05	Meath	Cusack Park, Mullingar
	J Dooley 1-6, A Cahill 0-6, J Brady 1-2, B Whelehan 0-3, K Flynn 0-2, J Pilkington 0-2, S Brennan 0-1, P Temple 0-1.		PJ Walsh 2-1, D Martin 0-2, M Gannon 0-1, E McManus 0-1.

Semi-finals

4 July 1991 Semi-final	Kilkenny	3-16 - 0-07	Dublin	O'Moore Park, Portlaoise
	C Carter 1-4, B Lawlor 1-3, T Tracey 1-1, DJ Carey 0-4, M Walsh 0-2, P O'Grady 0-1, A Ronan 0-1.		N Butler 0-4, J Kenny 0-2, P McManus 0-1.

11 July 1991 Semi-final	Offaly	2-09 - 3-06	Wexford	Nowlan Park, Kilkenny
	J Brady 1-3, A Cahill 0-4, S Grennan 1-0, B Whelehan 0-2.		S O'Leary 2-0, R Quigley 0-4, J Ormond 1-0, A Codd 0-1, L Murphy 0-1.

18 July 1991 Semi-final replay	Offaly	1-11 - 1-09	Wexford	Nowlan Park, Kilkenny
	B Whelehan 0-4, A Cahill 0-4, R Dooley 1-0, D Franks 0-1, N Bryant 0-1, E Martin 0-1.		R Hassey 1-0, L Murphy 0-3, D Guiney 0-2, R Quigley 0-2, J Kelly 0-1, C McBride 0-1.

Final

7 August 1991 Final	Offaly	2-10 - 0-12	Kilkenny	O'Moore Park, Portlaoise
	J Dooley 0-4, A Cahill 1-0, J Brady 1-0, J Troy 0-3, S Grennan 0-2, B Whelehan 0-1.		DJ Carey 0-5, A Ronan 0-2, C Carter 0-2, M Walsh 0-2, R Bolger 0-1.	Referee: P Delaney (Laois)

=== Munster Under-21 Hurling Championship ===
Quarter-finals

19 June 1991 Quarter-final	Waterford	5-14 - 1-08	Kerry	Walsh Park, Waterford
	S Daly 3-2, E Curran 2-0, J Brenner 0-5, N Dalton 0-2, P Queally 0-2, P Fanning 0-2, K McGrath 0-1.		PJ Hickey 1-7, S Nolan 0-1.	Referee: P Spillane (Cork)

28 June 1991 Quarter-final	Limerick	1-11 - 0-07	Clare	FitzGerald Park, Kilmallock
	F Carroll 1-7, C Carey 0-1, J Fitzgerald 0-1, P Heffernan 0-1, P Tobin 0-1.		P Minogue 0-3, D Tobin 0-1, C Clancy 0-1, P Healy 0-1, PJ O'Connell 0-1.

Semi-finals

10 July 1991 Semi-final	Tipperary	2-10 - 2-10	Limerick	Semple Stadium, Thurles
	K Ralph 1-4, M Ryan 1-0, P O'Keeffe 0-3, B O'Dwyer 0-2, R Ryan 0-1.		F Carroll 0-9, P Tobin 2-0, S O'Keeffe 0-1.	Referee: W Horgan (Cork)

10 July 1991 Semi-final	Cork	3-12 - 0-13	Waterford	Páirc Uí Chaoimh, Cork
	B Egan 2-2, G Heddigan 1-4, B Cunningham 0-5, K Roche 0-1.		K McGrath 0-3, S Daly 0-3, J Brenner 0-2, T Browne 0-2, P Walsh 0-1, N Dalton 0-1, P Fanning 0-1.	Referee: T Lyons (Limerick)

17 July 1991 Semi-final replay	Limerick	1-14 - 1-14	Tipperary	FitzGerald Park, Kilmallock
	F Carroll 0-10, M Walsh 1-0, M Sexton 0-1, C Shiels 0-1, J Fitzgibbon 0-1, D Quigley 0-1.		K Ralph 1-7, P O'Keeffe 0-2, B O'Dwyer 0-1, D O'Meara 0-1, R Ryan 0-1, T Connolly 0-1, E Maher 0-1.

31 July 1991 Semi-final second replay	Tipperary	0-09 - 1-09	Limerick	Semple Stadium, Thurles
	K Ralph 0-5, B Dwyer 0-2, TJ Connolly 0-1, P O'Keeffe 0-1.		F Carroll 0-6, D Quigley 1-0, M Walsh 0-2, J Mulqueen 0-1.

Final

7 August 1991 Final	Limerick	1-07 - 0-17	Cork	FitzGerald Park, Kilmallock
	F Carroll 0-6, J Fitzgibbon 1-0, C Carey 0-1.		B Cunningham 0-11, B Corcoran 0-3, V Murray 0-1, P O'Brien 0-1, G Heddigan 0-1.	Referee: M Quinn (Clare)

=== Ulster Under-21 Hurling Championship ===
Semi-finals

29 June 1991 Semi-final	Derry	1-05 - 1-09	Down	Lavey
				Referee: T McIntyre (Antrim)

29 June 1991 Semi-final	Tyrone	2-04 - 2-12	Antrim	Healy Park, Omagh
	G O'Connor 1-0, C Molloy 1-0, B McIntosh 0-2, S Woodhead 0-1, T Colton 0-1.		J Carson 1-4, C Ruddy 1-0, R Heenan 0-2, D McNaughton 0-2, P McCallion 0-2, R Donnelly 0-1, P Delargy 0-1.	Referee: M Ferguson (Fermanagh)

Final

27 July 1991 Final	Antrim	2-19 - 2-06	Down	Casement Park, Belfast
	G O'Kane 2-2, J Carson 0-8, Gary O'Kane 0-5, M Maguire 0-1, B Gillen 0-1, D McNaughton 0-1, D McKee 0-1.		P McCrickard 2-1, B Gallagher 0-3, C Arthurs 0-1, K Blaney 0-1.

=== All-Ireland Under-21 Hurling Championship ===
Semi-finals

11 August 1991 Semi-final	Offaly	2-19 - 1-08	Antrim	Drogheda Park, Drogheda
	J Brady 2-1, J Dooley 0-6, B Whelehan 0-5, J Troy 0-3, J Pilkington 0-2, A Cahill 0-1, S Brennan 0-1.		J Carson 1-4, D McNaughton 0-1, A Elliot 0-1, R Donnelly 0-1, J McMullen 0-1.	Referee: W Barrett (Tipperary)

18 August 1991 Semi-final	Galway	2-19 - 4-10	Cork	Cusack Park, Ennis
	C Moran 0-8, B Larkin 1-1, J Rabbitte 1-1, F O'Brien 0-4, J Campbell 0-3, B Keogh 0-1, M Donnellan 0-1.		B Cunningham 1-4, K Murray 2-0, B Egan 1-1, B Corcoran 0-3, P O'Brien 0-2.	Referee: P Delaney (Laois)

Final

8 September 1991 Final	Galway	2-17 - 1-09	Offaly	Gaelic Grounds, Limerick
	L Burke 1-2, C Moran 0-4, T O'Brien 0-4, J Campbell 1-0, J Rabbitte 0-3, B Keogh 0-1, B Larkin 0-1, M Curtin 0-1, C Helebert 0-1.		J Dooley 1-5, J Pilkington 0-1, P Temple 0-1, J Troy 0-1, A Cahill 0-1.	Referee: T Murray (Limerick)

== Championship statistics ==
=== Top scorers ===
Overall

Rank	Player	County	Tally	Total	Matches	Average
1	Frankie Carroll	Limerick	1-38	41	5	8.20
2	Johnny Dooley	Offaly	2-21	27	6	4.50
3	Brian Cunningham	Cork	1-20	23	3	7.66
4	John Carson	Antrim	2-16	22	3	7.33
4	Ken Ralph	Tipperary	2-16	22	3	7.33
5	John Brady	Offaly	5-06	21	6	3.50
