= 1992 All-Ireland Under-21 Hurling Championship =

All-Ireland Under-21 Hurling Championship 1992
Championship Details
- Dates: 8 May 1992 – 27 September 1992
- Teams: 17

All Ireland Champions
- Winners: Waterford (1st win)
- Captain: Tony Browne

All Ireland Runners-up
- Runners-up: Offaly
- Captain: Brian Whelehan

Provincial Champions
- Munster: Waterford
- Leinster: Offaly
- Ulster: Antrim
- Connacht: Not Played

Championship Statistics
- Top Scorer: Johnny Dooley (0-38)

The 1992 All-Ireland Under-21 Hurling Championship was the 29th staging of the All-Ireland Under-21 Hurling Championship since its establishment by the Gaelic Athletic Association in 1964. The championship began on 8 May 1992 and ended on 27 September 1992.

Galway were the defending champions, however, they were beaten by Offaly in the All-Ireland semi-final.

On 27 September 1992, Waterford won the championship following a 0-12 to 2-3 defeat of Offaly in a replay of the All-Ireland final. This was their first All-Ireland title in the under-21 grade.

Offaly's Johnny Dooley was the championship's top scorer with 0-38.

== Results ==
=== Leinster Under-21 Hurling Championship ===
Quarter-finals

10 June 1992 Quarter-final	Dublin	0-13 - 1-09	Wexford	Dr. Cullen Park, Carlow
	R Leahy 0-7, G Rogan 0-3, G Grey 0-1, D Farrell 0-1, Molloy 0-1.		L Murphy 0-6, S Byrne 1-0, P O'Leary 0-2, M Foley 0-1.

10 June 1992 Quarter-final	Laois	1-07 - 0-08	Meath	O'Connor Park, Tullamore
	P Fitzpatrick 1-2, M O'Hara 0-4, D Rooney 0-1.		B Reilly 0-3, D Martin 0-2, G Jones 0-2, T Donnelly 0-1.

Semi-finals

28 June 1992 Semi-final	Offaly	0-14 - 0-12	Dublin	O'Moore Park, Portlaoise
	J Dooley 0-10, E Martin 0-1, B Whelehan 0-1, K Martin 0-1, J Troy 0-1.		R Molloy 0-3, J Morris 0-2, D McCormack 0-2, L Walsh 0-1, J Small 0-1, N Butler 0-1, M Kiely 0-1, P Tiernan 0-1.	Referee: M Sheridan (Kildare)

1 July 1992 Semi-final	Kilkenny	0-24 - 3-08	Laois	Dr. Cullen Park, Carlow
	C Carter 0-8, SP Farrell 0-5, S Ryan 0-5, D Lawlor 0-4, B Grehan 0-1, B Barco 0-1.		M O'Hara 1-4, P Peacock 1-0, E Fitzpatrick 1-0, D Conroy 0-2, B Moore 0-1, E Fennell 0-1.	Referee: T Kirwan (Wexford)

Final

25 July 1992 Final	Offaly	1-15 - 2-10	Kilkenny	O'Moore Park, Portlaoise
	J Dooley 0-9, N Hand 1-1, J Troy 0-2, O O'Neill 0-2, B Whelehan 0-1.		D Lawlor 1-4, S Ryan 1-2, C Carter 0-2, P Farrell 0-1, D O'Neill 0-1.	Referee: D Murphy (Wexford)

=== Munster Under-21 Hurling Championship ===
Quarter-finals

8 May 1992 Quarter-final	Clare	0-20 - 1-03	Limerick	Cusack Park, Ennis
	P McNamara 0-8, J O'Connor 0-5, P Markham 0-2, P O'Rourke 0-2, B Quinn 0-2, P Minogue 0-1.		J O'Halloran 1-1, PJ Garvey 0-1, S Murphy 0-1.	Referee: J McDonnell (Tipperary)

8 May 1992 Quarter-final	Kerry	0-03 - 5-16	Cork	Fr. Breen Park, Kenmare
	JP Hickey 0-2, O Diggins 0-1.		B Corcoran 0-10, K Murray 2-1, D Fleming 2-1, R Dwane 1-0, B Egan 0-2, B Walsh 0-1, L Meaney 0-1.	Referee: T Lyons (Limerick)

Semi-finals

17 June 1992 Semi-final	Waterford	1-10 - 0-11	Cork	Walsh Park, Waterford
	N Dalton 1-4, A Fitzgerald 0-2, K McGrath 0-1, M Hubbard 0-1, T Fives 0-1, S Daly 0-1.		B Egan 0-5, K Murray 0-1, D Fleming 0-1, R O'Connell 0-1, B Corcoran 0-1, B Walsh 0-1, F McCormack 0-1.	Referee: M Doyle (Tipperary)

17 June 1992 Semi-final	Clare	1-14 - 0-13	Tipperary	Cusack Park, Ennis
	C Clancy 1-1, P O'Rourke 0-3, P McNamara 0-3, C Chaplin 0-2, P Minogue 0-2, J O'Connor 0-1, P Markham 0-1, K McNamara 0-1.		A Hogan 0-5, T Dunne 0-3, T Moloney 0-2, P O'Keeffe 0-2, B O'Meara 0-1.	Referee: W Horgan (Cork)

Final

15 July 1992 Final	Waterford	0-17 - 1-12	Clare	Semple Stadium, Thurles
	N Dalton 0-7, S Daly 0-4, J Brenner 0-3, T Browne 0-1, T Fives 0-1, A Fitzgerald 0-1,		P McNamara 0-6, C Clancy 1-0, J O'Connor 0-2, C Lynch 0-1, P O'Rourke 0-1, B Quinn 0-1, P Minogue 0-1.	Referee: M Doyle (Tipperary)

=== Ulster Under-21 Hurling Championship ===
Semi-finals

27 June 1992 Semi-final	Donegal	0-02 - 6-27	Antrim	MacCumhaill Park, Ballybofey
				Referee: S McCloskey (Derry)

Final

26 July 1992 Final	Down	3-04 - 3-11	Antrim	McKenna Park, Ballycran
	R Sharvin 2-0, D Byers 1-3, G McGrattan 0-1.		A Elliott 2-6, B McGarry 1-0, B Gillen 0-2, R Donnelly 0-1, G O'Kane 0-1, D Hegarty 0-1.	Referee: M McCormack (Meath)

=== All-Ireland Under-21 Hurling Championship ===
Semi-finals

22 August 1992 Semi-final	Waterford	4-16 - 2-08	Antrim	Parnell Park, Dublin
	S Daly 3-4, N Dalton 0-4, A Fitzgerald 1-0, P Power 0-2, M Hubbard 0-2, F Hartley 0-1, T Fives 0-1, M Geary 0-1, K McGrath 0-1.		B McGarry 1-2, A Elliott 0-4, B Gillan 1-0, R Donnelly 0-1, G O'Kane 0-1.

23 August 1992 Semi-final	Offaly	3-17 - 1-05	Galway	Gaelic Grounds, Limerick
	J Dooley 0-11, M Gallagher 1-1, N Hand 1-0, S Grennan 1-0, J Troy 0-2, S Farrell 0-2, M Hogan 0-1.		C Helebert 1-0, L Burke 0-2, C Moran 0-2, R Coyne 0-1.	Referee: J McDonnell (Tipperary)

Finals

13 September 1992 Final	Waterford	4-4 - 0-16	Offaly	Nowlan Park, Kilkenny
	S Daly 3-0, J Brenner 0-4, P Flynn 1-0.		J Dooley 0-6, S O'Farrell 0-3, B Whelehan 0-2, J Troy 0-2, S Grennan 0-1, M Gallagher 0-1, N Hand 0-1.	Referee: W Barrett (Tipperary)

27 September 1992 Final replay	Waterford	0-12 - 2-3	Offaly	Nowlan Park, Kilkenny
	P Flynn 0-5, S Daly 0-1, F Hartley 0-1, J Brenner 0-1, A Fitzgerald 0-1, M Hubbard 0-1, K McGrath 0-1, N Dalton 0-1.		J Troy 1-1, M Gallagher 1-0, J Dooley 0-2.	Referee: W Barrett (Tipperary)

== Championship statistics ==
=== Top scorers ===
Overall

Rank	Player	Club	Tally	Total	Matches	Average
1	Johnny Dooley	Offaly	0-38	38	5	7.60
2	Seán Daly	Waterford	6-10	28	5	5.60
3	Noel Dalton	Waterford	1-16	19	5	3.80

=== Miscellaneous ===
- Waterford won the Munster Championship for only the second time in their history. It was their first provincial triumph since 1974.
- The All-Ireland final was the first championship meeting of Offaly and Waterford. It is also the first drawn final since 1978.
