= 2007 All-Ireland Under-21 Hurling Championship final =

2007 All-Ireland Under-21 Hurling Championship Final
- Event: 2007 All-Ireland Under-21 Hurling Championship
Galway	Dublin
5-11	0-12
- Date: 8 September 2007
- Venue: Croke Park, Dublin
- Referee: Johnny Ryan (Tipperary)
- Attendance: 33,154

The 2007 All-Ireland Under-21 Hurling Championship final was a hurling match that was played at Croke Park, Dublin on 8 September 2007 to determine the winners of the 2007 All-Ireland Under-21 Hurling Championship, the 44th season of the All-Ireland Under-21 Hurling Championship, a tournament organised by the Gaelic Athletic Association for the champion teams of the four provinces of Ireland. The final was contested by Galway of Connacht and Dublin of Leinster, with Galway winning by 5–11 to 0–12.

The All-Ireland final between Galway and Dublin was their second meeting in a decider. Galway were hoping to claim their 9th championship. Dublin were hoping to win their first All-Ireland title. The game was played as part of a double-header with the All-Ireland decider in camogie.

Galway made a blistering start to the game and led by 3–4 to 0-2 after just 13 minutes thanks to goals from Conor Kavanagh (2) and Seán Glynn. Such was Galway's early dominance that Dublin's only point in the opening quarter came after four minutes from the game's top scorer Alan McCrabbe from a placed ball. The midfield partnership of McCrabbe and John McCaffrey kept alive any hope for Dublin, while Peadar Carton was also on target in a bright ten-minute spell during which they managed to hold Galway scoreless. The westerners came back strongly and a goal from Kerrill Wade before the interval ensured a 4–6 to 0-8 interval lead.

Dublin came out strongly for the second half with two McCrabbe points, but once again Galway found their groove and the Craobh Chiaráin clubman was the only Dublin player to hit the target in the second half. Joe Canning was playing a great supporting role at this stage for Galway but also chipped in with a 43rd-minute point, ensuring a double scores advantage at 4–8 to 0–10. An excellent Keith Kilkenny point, following a clean catch, and a Wade effort ensured that the gap was extended to 12 points. Dublin did stage a rally in the closing stages, mainly thanks to the free-taking abilities of McCrabbe. Galway substitute Noel Kelly sealed victory with a 60th-minute goal, before adding a late point to ensure a comprehensive victory for Galway.

Galway's All-Ireland victory was their second in three years. The victory put them in third position on the all-time roll of honour.

It was later reported that supporters attending the game experienced difficulties purchasing tickets — and entering the ground — for the decider. One thousand supporters, who had not purchased tickets, were granted free admission to the stadium when extra gates were opened to relieve congestion at the main turnstiles.

== Match ==
=== Details ===
8 September 2008

Galway	5-11 - 0-12	Dublin
K Wade (1-4, 2f), C Kavanagh (2-0), N Kelly (1-1), S Glynn (1-0), J Canning (0-3, 1f), F Coone (0-2), K Kilkenny (0-1).	Report	A McCrabbe (0-9, 6f, 1 '65', 1 sl), J McCaffrey (0-1), D Connolly (0-1), P Carton (0-1).

Croke Park, Dublin
Referee: J Ryan (Tipperary)

Galway	Dublin
