= Barry Daly (hurler) =

Irish hurler

Personal information
- Native name: Barra Ó Dálaigh (Irish)
- Born: 1990 (age 35–36) Galway, Ireland
- Height: 1.8 m (5 ft 11 in)

Sport
- Sport: Hurling
- Position: Right Half Forward
Club
- Years: Club
- 2007-: Clarinbridge
Club titles
- Galway titles: 1
- All-Ireland Titles: 1
College
- Years: College
- NUI Galway
College titles
- Fitzgibbon titles: 1
Inter-county*
Years	County	Apps (scores)
2011	Galway	5 (0-2)
- *Inter County team apps and scores correct as of 24 July 2011.

Barry Daly (born 1990) is an Irish hurler who played as a right wing-forward for the Galway senior team.

Daly made his first appearance for the team during the 2011 championship and, while he started the first two games, he later became an impact sub. An All-Ireland-winning captain in the under-21 grade, he has yet to win any major honors at senior level with Galway.

At club level Daly is an All-Ireland medalist with Clarinbridge. In addition to this he has also won a county championship winners' medal.

== Playing career ==
=== Club ===
Daly plays his club hurling with Clarinbridge and has enjoyed much success in the early years of his career. In 2010 he won his first county senior championship title following a replayed extra-time victory over Loughrea. Clarinbridge subsequently trounced O'Loughlin Gaels by 2–18 to 0–12 to give Daly an All-Ireland club winners' medal.

=== Inter-county ===
Daly never played minor hurling for Galway, however, he joined the county's under-21 team in 2009. The following year Galway qualified for an All-Ireland final meeting with Tipperary. That game turned into a rout with Daly's side suffering a 5–22 to 0–12 defeat.

Daly made his senior inter-county debut for Galway against Waterford in the 2011 National Hurling League. He made his championship debut against Westmeath later the same year.

== Honours ==
- 1 Galway Senior Hurling Championship 2010
- 1 All-Ireland Senior Club Hurling Championship 2011
- 1 All-Ireland Under-21 Hurling Championship 2011
- 1 Galway Hurler of the Year 2011

Sporting positions
Preceded by David Burke	Galway Under-21 Hurling Captain; 2011	Succeeded by Johnny Coen
Achievements
Preceded by Pádraic Maher (Tipperary)	All-Ireland Under-21 Hurling Final winning captain 2011	Succeeded by Conor McGrath (Clare)
