= All-Ireland Under-20 Hurling Championship =

Irish national junior tournament in hurling

GAA Hurling Under-20 All-Ireland Championship
- Current season or competition: 2026 All-Ireland Under-20 Hurling Championship
- Irish: Craobh Iomána Fé-20 na hÉireann
- Code: Hurling
- Founded: 1964; 62 years ago
- Region: Ireland (GAA)
- Trophy: James Nowlan Cup
- No. of teams: 2
- Title holders: Clare (5th title)
- Most titles: Cork (14 titles)
- Sponsors: Fulfil
- TV partner: TG4
- Official website: Official website

The GAA Hurling Under-20 All-Ireland Championship (known for sponsorship reasons as the Fulfil GAA Hurling Under-20 All-Ireland Championship) is an annual inter-county hurling competition organised by the Gaelic Athletic Association (GAA). It is the highest inter-county hurling competition for male players between the ages of 17 and 20 in Ireland. The championship was contested as the All-Ireland Under-21 Championship between 1964 and 2018 before changing to an under-20 age category from 2019.

The final serves as the culmination of a series of games played during the spring months, and the results determine which team receives the James Nowlan Cup. The All-Ireland Championship had always been played on a straight knockout basis whereby once a team loses they are eliminated from the championship, however, as of 2018 the qualification procedures for the championship have changed. Currently, qualification is limited to teams competing in the Leinster Championship and the Munster Championship.

Two teams currently participate in the All-Ireland Championship, the Munster Champions and the Leinster Champions, with the most successful teams coming from the province of Munster. Teams representing this province have won a total of 33 All-Ireland titles.

The title has been won by 9 different teams, 7 of whom have won the title more than once. The all-time record-holders are Cork, who have won the championship on 14 occasions.

== History ==
=== Creation ===
Since 1962, the Munster Council had been organising a provincial championship for under-21 players in Gaelic football. This championship proved successful in bridging the gap between the minor and senior grades in a way in which the junior championship had failed to do. At the GAA's annual Congress in April 1963, the Kerry County Board introduced a successful motion in favour of extending the provincial championship to All-Ireland level. It was the fifth All-Ireland championship to be created after the corresponding championships in senior (1887), junior (1912), minor (1928) and intermediate (1961).

=== Beginnings ===
The inaugural All-Ireland Championship in 1964 used a provincial format. 16 teams contested the respective championships in Leinster and Munster, with Tiobraid Árann and Loch Garman emerging as the respective champions. Ros Comáin and Aontroim were the respective unopposed representatives from Connacht and Ulster.

Antrim and Wexford contested the very first championship match on Sunday 2 August 1964 at Casement Park, Belfast. The inaugural All-Ireland final took place on 4 October 1964, with Tiobraid Árann defeating Loch Garman to take the title.

=== Proposed changes ===
In 2008 a radical motion was brought before a special Congress in an effort to combat player burnout. It was proposed to merge the existing under-21 and minor championships to create a new All-Ireland Under-19 Hurling Championship. This motion was defeated by 115 votes to 58.

A similar motion was later introduced in an effort to lower the age and create a new All-Ireland Under-20 Championship, however, this motion was also defeated.

=== Development ===
Like the corresponding championships at senior and minor levels, Leinster and Munster teams grew to become the most dominant, as Gaelic football was the more dominant sport in Ulster and Connacht. After leaving the Munster Championship in 1970, Galway became the only credible team in Connacht and was essentially given an automatic pass to the All-Ireland semi-final every year.

After the introduction of the "back door" system in the senior and minor championships in 1997, the under-21 championship remained as the last true straight knock-out championship. This changed following a Central Council motion to alter the format of the championship was endorsed by a Special Congress on 30 September 2017. The proposal to allow Galway and Ulster teams as agreed by the Leinster and Ulster Councils into the Leinster Championship was backed by 72% of delegates. The original recommendation would have ended All-Ireland semi-finals as the Munster winners were set to face off against the Leinster victors from next year. However, Cork argued that they should be retained with the Munster champions taking on the runners-up in Leinster and vice versa. Their idea was endorsed by 78% of delegates. The new format was used for the first time in 2018.

At the GAA Congress on 24 February 2018, the age limit of the championship was changed to twenty, following a successful motion by the Offaly County Board. In contrast to Gaelic football, under-20 hurlers were also eligible to play both under-20 and senior hurling for their county. This provision was abolished at the 2020 GAA Congress. The "back door system" for the defeated provincial finalists was also permanently abolished, having been suspended in 2020 due to the COVID-19 pandemic.

== Format ==
=== Qualification ===
Province	Championship	Teams progressing
Leinster	Leinster Under-20 Hurling Championship	Champions
Munster	Munster Under-20 Hurling Championship	Champions

=== Championship ===
There are two teams in the All-Ireland Championship. The respective Leinster and Munster U-20 Hurling Championship winners progress directly to the All-Ireland U-20 Hurling Championship Final.

== Teams ==
=== 2026 Championship ===
Seventeen counties will compete in the 2026 All-Ireland Under-20 Hurling Championship: twelve teams in the Leinster Under-20 Hurling Championship, and five teams in the Munster Under-20 Hurling Championship.

County	Stadium	Province	All-Irelands	Last All-Ireland
Antrim	Corrigan Park	Ulster	0	—
Carlow	Netwatch Cullen Park	Leinster	0	—
Clare	Cusack Park	Munster	4	2014
Cork	Supervalu Páirc Uí Chaoimh	Munster	14	2023
Dublin	Parnell Park	Leinster	0	—
Galway	Pearse Stadium	Connacht	10	2011
Kerry	Austin Stack Park	Munster	0	—
Kildare	St Conleth's Park	Leinster	0	—
Kilkenny	UPMC Nowlan Park	Leinster	12	2022
Laois	Laois Hire O'Moore Park	Leinster	0	—
Limerick	TUS Gaelic Grounds	Munster	6	2017
Meath	Páirc Tailteann	Leinster	0	—
Offaly	Glenisk O'Connor Park	Leinster	1	2024
Tipperary	FBD Semple Stadium	Munster	12	2025
Waterford	Fraher Field	Munster	2	2016
Westmeath	TEG Cusack Park	Leinster	0	—
Wexford	Chadwicks Wexford Park	Leinster	1	1965

== Venues ==
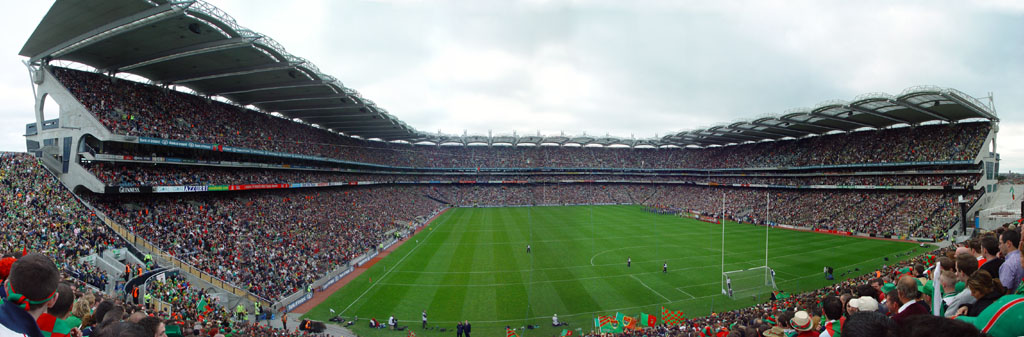
Croke Park in Dublin last hosted the All-Ireland final in 2009.

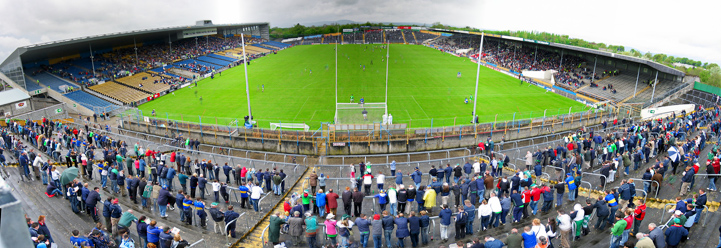
Semple Stadium in Thurles has hosted 20 All-Ireland finals.

=== Attendances ===
Stadium attendances are a significant source of regular income for the GAA and for the teams involved. For the 2017 championship, the average attendances for the three games was 7,336 with a total aggregate attendance figure of 22,009.

=== Semi-finals ===
The All-Ireland semi-finals have been played exclusively at Semple Stadium in Thurles since 2011. Both semi-finals are usually played on the same day as part of a double-header of games. Semple Stadium had been regularly used as a semi-final venue prior to this, however, a number of other stadiums around the country were also used. Páirc Esler in Newry and Páirc Tailteann in Navan were regularly used for semi-finals involving a Leinster-Ulster pairing. Parnell Park in Dublin was used on a number of occasions for Munster-Ulster clashes, while O'Connor Park in Tullamore was a regular venue for Connacht-Munster and Connacht-Leinster meetings.

=== Final ===
Since 2010, Semple Stadium in Thurles has been the regular venue for the All-Ireland final. Prior to this, Semple Stadium had hosted the All-Ireland final on 12 previous occasions. Other stadiums which hosted the All-Ireland final include Walsh Park (8 times), Croke Park (7 times), Nowlan Park (6 times), Gaelic Grounds (5 times) and O'Connor Park (3 times).

== Trophy and medals ==
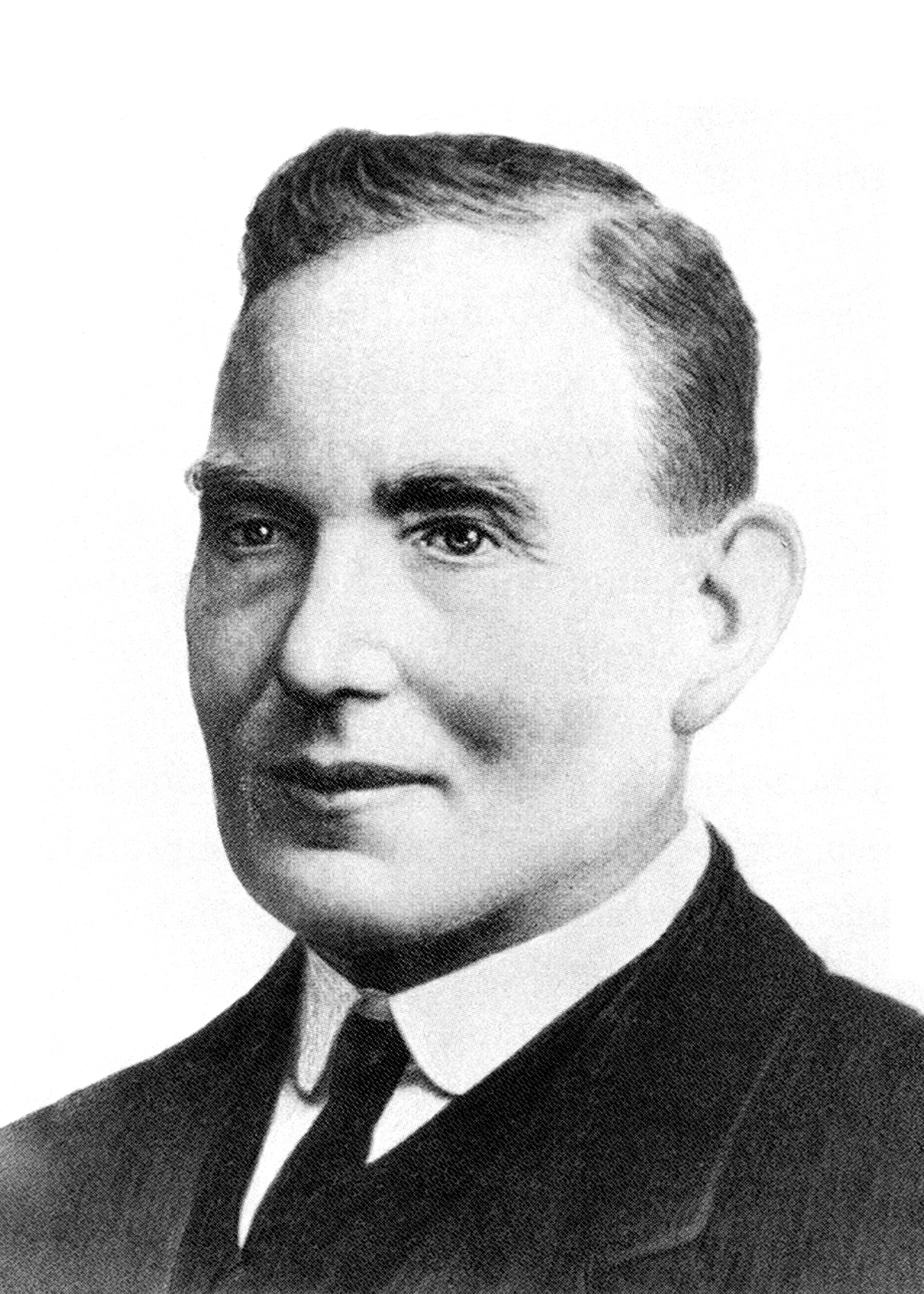
James Nowlan was commemorated by having the All-Ireland cup named in his honour in 2016.

At the end of the All-Ireland final, the winning team is presented with a trophy. The cup is held by the winning team until the following year's final. Traditionally, the presentation is made at a special rostrum in stand where GAA and political dignitaries and special guests view the match.

The cup is decorated with ribbons in the colours of the winning team. During the game the cup actually has both teams' sets of ribbons attached and the runners-up ribbons are removed before the presentation. The winning captain accepts the cup on behalf of his team before giving a short speech. Individual members of the winning team then have an opportunity to come to the rostrum to lift the cup. The trophy is known as the Cross of Cashel, probably the most unique looking trophy awarded by the GAA. Awarded for the first time in 1967, a spectacular cast bronze trophy modelled on the ancient Celtic cross found at the rock of Cashel in Co Tipperary, it is a tall narrow and quiet heavy trophy with a square bronze base holding a cross depicting the crucifixion of Jesus. P. J. Ryan of Tipperary was the first recipient. After nearly 50 years the trophy was retired for undisclosed reasons following the conclusion of the 2015 championship. Diarmaid Byrnes of Limerick was the last captain to receive the trophy.

In 2016 the GAA purchased a second hand English soccer cup in London and renamed it the James Nowlan Cup. Born in Monasterevin, James Nowlan became the first Chairman of the Leinster Council in 1900. He was elected President of the GAA in 1901, serving in that position until 1921. As the longest-serving president, Nowlan was honoured as the GAA's only Honorary Life President.

In accordance with GAA rules, the Central Council awards up to twenty-four gold medals to the winners of the All-Ireland final.

== Sponsorship ==
Since 2003, the All-Ireland Championship has been sponsored. The sponsor has usually been able to determine the championship's sponsorship name.

Period	Sponsor(s)	Name
1964-2002	No main sponsor	The All-Ireland Under-21 Championship
2003-2008	(Republic of Ireland) Erin Foods	The Erin All-Ireland Under-21 Hurling Championship
2009–2018	(Republic of Ireland) Bord Gáis Energy	The Bord Gáis Energy All-Ireland Under-21 Hurling Championship
2019-2021	(Republic of Ireland) Bord Gáis Energy	The Bord Gáis Energy All-Ireland Under-20 Hurling Championship
2022-	(Republic of Ireland) oneills.com	The oneills.com All-Ireland Under-20 Hurling Championship

== List of finals ==
Year	Winners		Runners-up		Venue	Winning Captain
Year	County	Score	County	Score	Venue	Winning Captain
1964	Tipperary	8-09	Wexford	3-01	Nowlan Park	Francis Loughnane
1965	Wexford	3-07	Tipperary	1-04	Nowlan Park	Willie O'Neill
1966	Cork	9-9 (4-9, 3-12)	Wexford	5-9 (4-9, 5-6)	Croke Park (Gaelic Grounds, Nowlan Park)	Gerald McCarthy
1967	Tipperary	1-18	Dublin	3-07	Croke Park	P. J. Ryan
1968	Cork	2-18	Kilkenny	3-9	Walsh Park	Pat Hegarty
1969	Cork	5-13	Wexford	4-7	Walsh Park	Mick McCarthy
1970	Cork	5-17 (3-8)	Wexford	0-8 (2-11)	Croke Park	Teddy O'Brien
1971	Cork	7-8	Wexford	1-11	Walsh Park	Pat McDonnell
1972	Galway	2-9	Dublin	1-10	Gaelic Grounds	Iggy Clarke
1973	Cork	2-10	Wexford	4-2	Páirc Daibhín	Martin O'Doherty
1974	Kilkenny	3-8	Waterford	3-7	Semple Stadium	Ger Fennelly
1975	Kilkenny	5-13	Cork	2-19	Fraher Field	Kevin Fennelly
1976	Cork	2-17	Kilkenny	1-8	Walsh Park	Tadhg Murphy
1977	Kilkenny	2-9	Cork	1-9	Semple Stadium	Mickey Lyng
1978	Galway	3-15 (3-5)	Tipperary	2-8 (2-8)	Gaelic Grounds	Bernie Forde
1979	Tipperary	2-12	Galway	1-09	O'Moore Park	Michael Doyle
1980	Tipperary	2-09	Kilkenny	0-14	Walsh Park	P. J. Maxwell
1981	Tipperary	2-16	Kilkenny	1-10	Walsh Park	Philip Kennedy
1982	Cork	0-12	Galway	0-11	St. Brendan's Park	Martin McCarthy
1983	Galway	0-12	Tipperary	1-06	O'Connor Park	Peter Casserly
1984	Kilkenny	1-12	Tipperary	0-11	Walsh Park	Séamus Delahunty
1985	Tipperary	1-10	Kilkenny	2-06	Walsh Park	Michael Scully
1986	Galway	0-14	Wexford	2-05	Semple Stadium	Anthony Cunningham
1987	Limerick	2-15	Galway	3-06	Cusack Park	Gussie Ryan
1988	Cork	4-11	Kilkenny	1-05	St. Brendan's Park	Christy Connery
1989	Tipperary	4-10	Offaly	3-11	O'Moore Park	Declan Ryan
1990	Kilkenny	2-11	Tipperary	1-11	O'Moore Park	Jamesie Brennan
1991	Galway	2-17	Offaly	1-9	Gaelic Grounds	Brian Feeney
1992	Waterford	0-12 (4-4)	Offaly	2-3 (0-16)	Nowlan Park	Tony Browne
1993	Galway	2-9 (2-14)	Kilkenny	3-3 (3-11)	O'Connor Park	Liam Burke
1994	Kilkenny	3-10	Galway	0-11	O'Connor Park	Philly Larkin
1995	Tipperary	1-14	Kilkenny	1-10	Semple Stadium	Brian Horgan
1996	Galway	1-14	Wexford	0-7	Semple Stadium	Peter Huban
1997	Cork	3-11	Galway	0-13	Semple Stadium	Dan Murphy
1998	Cork	2-15	Galway	2-10	Semple Stadium	Dan Murphy
1999	Kilkenny	1-13	Galway	0-14	O'Connor Park	Noel Hickey
2000	Limerick	1-13	Galway	0-13	Semple Stadium	Donncha Sheehan
2001	Limerick	0-17	Wexford	2-10	Semple Stadium	Timmy Houlihan
2002	Limerick	3-17	Galway	0-8	Semple Stadium	Peter Lawlor
2003	Kilkenny	2-13	Galway	0-12	Semple Stadium	Jackie Tyrrell
2004	Kilkenny	3-12	Tipperary	1-6	Nowlan Park	James "Cha" Fitzpatrick
2005	Galway	1-15	Kilkenny	1-14	Gaelic Grounds	Kenneth Burke
2006	Kilkenny	1-11 (2-14)	Tipperary	0-11 (2-14)	Semple Stadium (Croke Park)	Michael Fennelly
2007	Galway	5-11	Dublin	0-12	Croke Park	Kevin Hynes
2008	Kilkenny	2-13	Tipperary	0-15	Croke Park	James Dowling
2009	Clare	0-15	Kilkenny	0-14	Croke Park	Ciarán O'Doherty
2010	Tipperary	5-22	Galway	0-12	Semple Stadium	Pádraic Maher
2011	Galway	3-14	Dublin	1-10	Semple Stadium	Barry Daly
2012	Clare	2-17	Kilkenny	2-11	Semple Stadium	Conor McGrath
2013	Clare	2-28	Antrim	0-12	Semple Stadium	Paul Flanagan
2014	Clare	2-20	Wexford	2-11	Semple Stadium	Tony Kelly
2015	Limerick	0-26	Wexford	1-7	Semple Stadium	Diarmaid Byrnes
2016	Waterford	5-15	Galway	0-14	Semple Stadium	Adam Farrell & Patrick Curran
2017	Limerick	0-17	Kilkenny	0-11	Semple Stadium	Tom Morrissey
2018	Tipperary	3-13	Cork	1-16	Gaelic Grounds	Colin English
2019	Tipperary	5-17	Cork	1-18	Gaelic Grounds	Craig Morgan
2020	Cork	2-19	Dublin	1-18	UPMC Nowlan Park	Conor O'Callaghan
2021	Cork	4-19	Galway	2-14	Semple Stadium	Cormac O'Brien
2022	Kilkenny	0-19	Limerick	0-18	FBD Semple Stadium	Thomas Walsh
2023	Cork	2-22	Offaly	3-13	FBD Semple Stadium	Micheál Mullins
2024	Offaly	2-20	Tipperary	2-14	UPMC Nowlan Park	Dan Bourke
2025	Tipperary	3-19	Kilkenny	1-16	UPMC Nowlan Park	Sam O'Farrell
2026	Clare	4-20	Galway	2-16	FBD Semple Stadium	Eoghan Gunning

== Roll of honour ==
#	County	Title(s)	Runners-up	Years won	Years Runners-up
1	Cork	14	4	1966, 1968, 1969, 1970, 1971, 1973, 1976, 1982, 1988, 1997, 1998, 2020, 2021, 2023	1975, 1977, 2018, 2019
2	Kilkenny	12	13	1974, 1975, 1977, 1984, 1990, 1994, 1999, 2003, 2004, 2006, 2008, 2022	1968, 1976, 1980, 1981, 1985, 1988, 1993, 1995, 2005, 2009, 2012, 2017, 2025
3	Tipperary	12	9	1964, 1967, 1979, 1980, 1981, 1985, 1989, 1995, 2010, 2018, 2019, 2025	1965, 1978, 1983, 1984, 1990, 2004, 2006, 2008, 2024
4	Galway	10	13	1972, 1978, 1983, 1986, 1991, 1993, 1996, 2005, 2007, 2011	1979, 1982, 1987, 1994, 1997, 1998, 1999, 2002, 2003, 2010, 2016, 2021, 2026
5	Limerick	6	1	1987, 2000, 2001, 2002, 2015, 2017	2022
6	Clare	5	0	2009, 2012, 2013, 2014, 2026	-
7	Waterford	2	1	1992, 2016	1974
8	Wexford	1	12	1965	1964, 1966, 1969, 1970, 1971, 1973, 1986, 1996, 2000, 2001, 2014, 2015
8	Offaly	1	4	2024	1989, 1991, 1992, 2023
10	Dublin	0	5	-	1967, 1972, 2007, 2011, 2020
10	Antrim	0	1	-	2013

== Performances by province ==
A representative of each of the four provinces of Ireland have made an appearance in the final match of the All-Ireland.

To date, Munster leads with 38 titles, followed by Leinster with 14 titles and Connacht with 10 titles. A team from Ulster has made the championship final just once, but was defeated by a Munster side.

Province	Performances	
Province	Winners	Runners-up
Munster	38 titles: Cork (14), Tipperary (12), Limerick (6), Clare (4), Waterford (2)	15 times: Tipperary (9), Cork (4), Limerick (1), Waterford (1)
Leinster	14 titles: Kilkenny (12), Offaly (1), Wexford (1)	35 times: Kilkenny (13), Wexford (12), Dublin (5), Offaly (4), Galway (1)
Connacht	10 titles: Galway (10)	11 times: Galway (11)
Ulster	—	1 time: Antrim (1)

== Records and statistics ==
=== By decade ===
The most successful team of each decade, judged by number of All-Ireland Under-21 and Under-20 Hurling Championship titles, is as follows:

- 1960s: 3 for Cork (1966-68-69)
- 1970s: 4 for Cork (1970-71-73-76)
- 1980s: 4 for Tipperary (1980-81-85-89)
- 1990s: 3 each for Kilkenny (1990-94-99) and Galway (1991-93-96)
- 2000s: 4 for Kilkenny (2003-04-06-08)
- 2010s: 3 for Clare (2012-13-14) and Tipperary (2010-18-19)
- 2020s: 3 so far for Cork (2020-21-23)

=== By millennium ===
- this: 5 — Limerick, Clare
- previous: 11 - Cork

=== Gaps ===
Longest gaps between successive All-Ireland titles:

- 24 years: Waterford (1992-2016)
- 22 years: Cork (1998-2020)
- 15 years: Tipperary (1995-2010)
- 14 years: Kilkenny (2008-2022)
- 13 years: Limerick (1987-2000)
- 13 years: Limerick (2002-2015)
- 12 years: Tipperary (1967-1979)
- 12 years: Clare (2014-2026)
- 9 years: Cork (1988-1997)
- 8 years: Tipperary (2010-2018)

=== Top scorers ===
==== In finals ====
Final	Top scorer	Team	Score	Total
1996	Kevin Broderick	Galway	1-02	5
1996	Paul Codd	Wexford	0-05	5
1997	Eugene Cloonan	Galway	0-07	7
1998	Eugene Cloonan	Galway	1-08	11
1999	Henry Shefflin	Kilkenny	0-08	8
1999	Eugene Cloonan	Galway	0-08	8
2000	Mark Keane	Limerick	1-08	11
2001	Mark Keane	Limerick	0-07	7
2002	Andrew O'Shaughnessy	Limerick	2-02	8
2003	Conor Phelan	Kilkenny	1-04	7
2003	Ger Farragher	Galway	0-07	7
2004	Richie Power	Kilkenny	0-07	7
2005	Eoin Larkin	Kilkenny	1-09	12
2006	Darragh Egan	Tipperary	1-05	8
2007	Alan McCrabbe	Dublin	0-09	9
2008	Matthew Ruth	Kilkenny	2-02	8
2008	Pa Bourke	Tipperary	0-08	8
2009	Colin Ryan	Clare	0-09	9
2010	Seán Carey	Tipperary	1-03	6
2010	Brian O'Meara	Tipperary	1-03	6
2010	John O'Dwyer	Tipperary	1-03	6
2011	Tadhg Haran	Galway	1-03	6
2012	Cathal O'Connell	Clare	1-06	9
2013	Cathal O'Connell	Clare	0-11	11
2014	Tony Kelly	Clare	0-07	7
2014	Jack Guiney	Wexford	0-07	7
2015	Conor McDonald	Wexford	1-04	7
2016	Patrick Curran	Waterford	1-09	12
2017	Aaron Gillane	Limerick	0-07	7
2018	Jake Morris	Tipperary	1-04	7
2019	Billy Seymour	Tipperary	2-05	11
2020	Liam Murphy	Dublin	0-06	6
2021	Donal O'Shea	Galway	1-07	10
2022	Aidan O'Connor	Limerick	0-10	10
2023	Ben Cunningham	Cork	0-10	10
2024	Adam Screeney	Offaly	0-12	12

== See also ==
- List of All-Ireland Under-20 Hurling Championship winners
- All-Ireland Under-20 B Hurling Championship (Tier 2)
- All-Ireland Under-20 C Hurling Championship (Tier 3)
- All-Ireland Senior Hurling Championship
- All-Ireland Minor Hurling Championship
