= 2010 All-Ireland Senior Hurling Championship final =

2010 All-Ireland Senior Hurling Final
- Event: 2010 All-Ireland Senior Hurling Championship
Kilkenny	Tipperary
1–18	4–17
- Date: 5 September 2010
- Venue: Croke Park, Dublin
- Man of the Match: Lar Corbett
- Referee: Michael Wadding (Waterford)
- Attendance: 81,765
- Weather: Dull with Light Rain; 15 °C (59 °F)

The 2010 All-Ireland Senior Hurling Championship Final was the 113th All-Ireland Final and the culmination of the 2010 All-Ireland Senior Hurling Championship, an inter-county hurling tournament for the top teams in Ireland. The match was held at Croke Park, Dublin, on 5 September 2010 and was a repeat of the 2009 final with Kilkenny taking on Tipperary. Kilkenny were attempting to win a fifth All-Ireland title in-a-row, a feat never achieved in either hurling or Gaelic football. This has been referred to as the "Drive for Five". The game was watched by more than 80,000 in the stadium as well as a global audience on TV, radio, etc. The Final attracted the highest ever Irish viewership for an All Ireland Hurling Final peaking at 1.236 million viewers in the final minutes of the match, with an average audience of over one million people during the game which was shown live on RTÉ2. The match was won by Tipperary by a score of 4–17 to 1–18.

== Pre-match ==
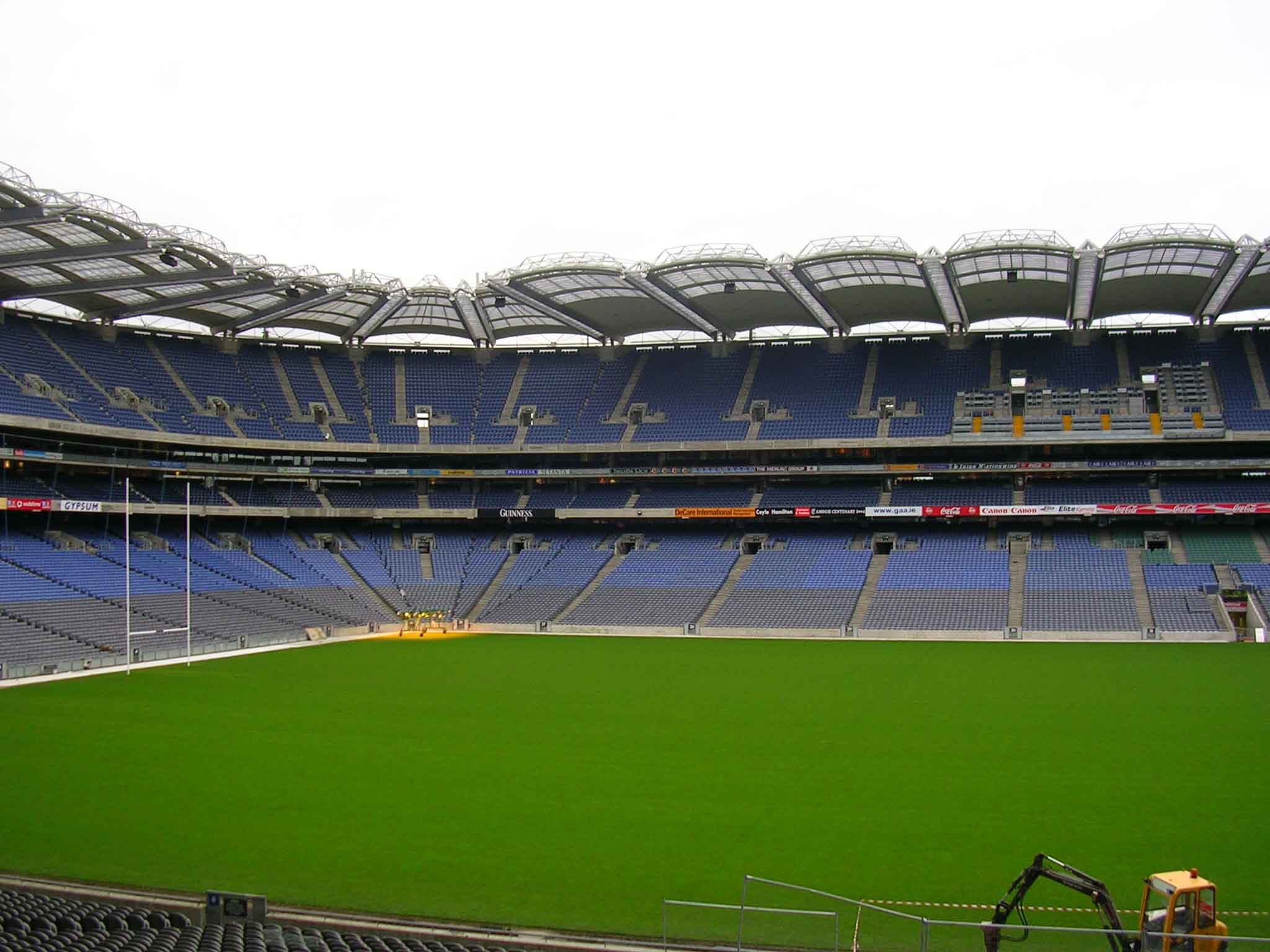
Croke Park, the venue for the 2010 final

=== Background ===
Kilkenny were Leinster champions, having beaten Dublin and Galway to earn that title. They beat Cork in the semi-final on 8 August 2010. Tipperary lost to Cork in the first round of the Munster championship and went into the All Ireland Qualifiers, where they beat Wexford, Offaly and Galway, before beating Waterford in their semi-final on 15 August 2010.

Kilkenny were bidding for their 22nd successive championship win and had not lost a game since losing to Galway in the 2005 All-Ireland semi-final. In 2009 Kilkenny became the first county since Cork in 1941 – 1944 to win the four in a row and was bidding for their 33rd All Ireland title. Tipperary, who lost to Kilkenny by five points in the previous years final were seeking their first All-Ireland title since 2001 and their 26th title in all.

The pre-match betting made Kilkenny favourites, with Bookmaker Paddy Power giving odds of 4/11 on a Kilkenny win, Tipperary were 5/2 to win with a draw at 12/1. Paddy Power also pledged to refund a wide range of losing bets on the match if Kilkenny were beaten, risking a potential five figure refund should Tipperary reverse the form book.

Before the senior final, Kilkenny beat Clare in the minor hurling final.

=== Team news ===
Much of the pre-match build-up centred around the fitness of Kilkenny's Henry Shefflin, who had torn his cruciate ligament in the semi-final against Cork, an injury which generally takes several months to recover from. Shefflin attended noted physiotherapist, Gerard Hartmann, who specialised in such injuries, and recovered to such a degree that within 3 weeks, he took a full part in a Kilkenny training session watched by around 8,000 fans, without noticeable discomfort. Shefflin was then selected to start the All Ireland Final, but due in part to slippery conditions on the day, pulled up after 12 minutes in obvious pain, and had to be substituted. Tipperary manager Liam Sheedy opted to stick with the same team that had defeated Waterford in the semi-final, the team contained eleven of the players that started the 2009 final.

=== Referee ===
Waterford-based referee Michael Wadding was named as the referee for the 2010 All-Ireland final on 17 August 2010. The Roanmore club man, who has been refereeing for twenty-one years, has previously taken charge of All-Ireland championship deciders at minor level in 1997 and at under-21 level in 2003. He was also the referee for the 2010 Leinster final between Kilkenny and Galway. Wadding, however, has been involved in three previous All-Ireland finals at senior level – twice as stand-by referee and once as a linesman.

The GAA opted against appointing high-profile referees as umpires for the final, as had been suggested in the wake of the controversial end to the 2010 Leinster Senior Football Championship Final between Meath and Louth. Instead, Wadding will use his usual team of umpires from his native club – Noel Cowman, Pat Byrne, Thomas Martin and Noel Crowley.

== Match summary ==
=== First half ===
A Henry Shefflin free cancelled out Eoin Kelly's opening score before two more Kelly points were added to by a goal by Lar Corbett after 13 minutes. Corbett shrugged off Noel Hickey to field a long ball from Shane McGrath before lashing the ball to the net from close range. John O'Brien added to Tipperary's lead after Brendan Cummins had saved a goal attempt at the other end by TJ Reid, Henry Shefflin lasted only 13 minutes as he succumbed to his cruciate ligament injury, which saw Michael Rice introduced as Tipperary increased their lead to 1–6 to 0–3 after 19 minutes following Brendan Maher and Eoin Kelly points. Richie Power hit 1–5 of Kilkenny's remaining first-half tally of 1–6 including a 32nd-minute goal after Eoin Larkin's thrust into the Tipperary defence. Tipperary's six-point lead of the 30th minute dwindled to one point at half time as Kilkenny's dominance began to translate into scores. Tipperary led by 1–10 to 1–9 at half time.

=== Second half ===
TJ Reid leveled the scores straight after the interval but Tipperary responded with 2–1 in four minutes as Eoin Kelly's free was added to by goals from Lar Corbett and Noel McGrath. Corbett lashed his second goal to the roof of the net after being set up by a pass on the run from Noel McGrath. McGrath's instinct to follow up a long ball into the Kilkenny goalmouth proved inspired as he scrambled the ball to the net from close range for his goal. Kilkenny then hit four unanswered points to leave one point between the sides with 16 minutes left. Substitute Séamus Callanan then fired over successive points in the 59th and 62nd minutes, followed shortly afterwards by an Eoin Kelly free to extend Tipperary's lead to six points. Richie Power and John Mulhall then added Kilkenny points before substitutes Benny Dunne and then Séamus Hennessy scored long-range points for Tipperary . Lar Corbett then got his third goal in injury time from a pass from Patrick Maher to seal the county's 26th Liam MacCarthy Cup.

Tipperary's final tally of 4–17 is the biggest total ever scored against Kilkenny in a 70-minute final (the 5–17 for Tipperary in 1971 was in an 80-minute decider). Lar Corbett became only the second player in modern times and first since Eddie O'Brien in 1970 for Cork to score a hat-trick in a final. Tipperary's win continued their unique achievement of having won a Senior Hurling All-Ireland in every decade since the GAA's foundation in 1884.

== Match details ==
5 September 2010
15:30 IST

Kilkenny	1–18 – 4–17	Tipperary
R Power 1–9; TJ Reid 0–4; M Rice 0–1; J Mulhall 0–1; H Shefflin 0–1; A Fogarty 0–1; D Lyng 0–1	Report	L Corbett 3–0; E Kelly 0–7; N McGrath 1–0; J O'Brien 0–2; B Maher 0–2; S Callanan 0–2; G Ryan 0–1; S Hennessy 0–1; B Cummins 0–1; B Dunne 0–1

Croke Park, Dublin
Attendance: 81,765
Referee: Michael Wadding (Waterford)

Kilkenny	Tipperary

KILKENNY:
1	P. J. Ryan
2	John Dalton	(yellow card) 56'
3	Noel Hickey
4	Jackie Tyrrell	(yellow card) 55'
5	Tommy Walsh	(yellow card) 49'
6	John Tennyson	(yellow card) 42'
7	J. J. Delaney
8	James Fitzpatrick		(substituted off) 48'
9	Michael Fennelly
10	T. J. Reid (captain)		(substituted off) 62'
11	Henry Shefflin		(substituted off) 12'
12	Eoin Larkin
13	Eddie Brennan		(substituted off) 48'
14	Richie Power
15	Aidan Fogarty		(substituted off) 62'
Substitutes:
16	David Herity
17	Michael Kavanagh
18	James Ryall
19	Michael Rice		(substituted on) 12'
20	Derek Lyng		(substituted on) 48'
21	Martin Comerford		(substituted on) 48'
22	Richie Hogan		(substituted on) 62'
23	Paddy Hogan
24	Damien Fogarty
25	Canice Hickey
26	Seán Cummins
27	P. J. Delaney
28	John Mulhall		(substituted on) 62'
29	Eoin Guinan
30	Richie O'Neill
Manager:
Brian Cody

TIPPERARY:
1	Brendan Cummins
2	Paddy Stapleton
3	Paul Curran
4	Michael Cahill
5	Declan Fanning		(substituted off) 68'
6	Conor O'Mahoney		(substituted off) 56'
7	Pádraic Maher
8	Brendan Maher		(substituted off) 70'
9	Shane McGrath	(yellow card) 34'	(substituted off) 64'
10	Gearóid Ryan
11	Patrick Maher
12	John O'Brien	(yellow card) 56'	(substituted off) 56'
13	Noel McGrath
14	Eoin Kelly (captain)	(yellow card) 49'
15	Lar Corbett
Substitutes:
16	Darren Gleeson
17	Pa Bourke
18	Jody Brennan
19	Séamus Callanan		(substituted on) 56'
20	Benny Dunne		(substituted on) 64'
21	Darragh Egan
22	Timmy Hammersley
23	Michael Heffernan
24	Séamus Hennessy		(substituted on) 70'
25	Pat Kerwick
26	Shane Maher
27	Hugh Maloney
28	Conor O'Brien		(substituted on) 56'
29	Brian O'Meara
30	David Young	(yellow card) 68'	(substituted on) 68'
Manager:
Liam Sheedy

Man of the Match:
Lar Corbett

Linesmen:
Brian Gavin (Offaly)
James Owens (Wexford)

Sideline Official
Cathal McAllister (Cork)

Umpires
Noel Cowman
Pat Byrne
Noel Crowley
Thomas Martin

== Trophy presentation ==
This was the first final in many years where there was no pitch invasion by the fans at the full-time whistle. This was because of a new barricade which prevents fans on Hill 16 from entering the pitch. The trophy was presented from the Hogan stand to Tipperary captain Eoin Kelly by GAA president Christy Cooney. Immediately after Kelly's acceptance speech, Tipperary substitute Pat Kerwick sang 'The Galtee Mountain Boy'. The Tipperary team then paraded the cup around the stadium in a lap of honour.

== Man of the Match ==
Lar Corbett was named the All Ireland hurling final 'Man of the Match' by the Sunday Game panel. Other nominees for the award were Tipperary left back Pádraic Maher and centre forward Noel McGrath. The award was presented to Corbett at the Tipperary victory banquet in Dublin's Burlington Hotel on the night of the final, and was judged by panel members Dónal O'Grady, Pete Finnerty and Michael Duignan.

== Reaction ==
Kilkenny manager Brian Cody admitted that his Kilkenny team were second best to a 'driven, spirited, genuine and full of hurling' Tipperary in the All-Ireland final,'We have no excuses and no begrudgery in the slightest. No doubt about it, the better team won the All-Ireland final' he said. Tipperary manager Liam Sheedy was delighted with his team's performance saying "Powerful. Great bunch. they are three years in the journey, there has been a lot of twists and turns and highs and lows. First week in June and a lot of people said we didn’t do qualifiers. I think we saw today what this team could do. We felt today that we were in a very good position. Whether you like it or not, five-in-a-row brings its own pressures. We needed 33 players to do this. I am delighted for that group because I feel they have shipped a lot of criticism unfairly. I am a Tipperary man and a proud one and we put everything we had into this".

Tipperary goalkeeper Brendan Cummins said "This time last year we were sinking, we were really disappointed after losing the final. This year makes it all worthwhile, I have huge belief in this group, huge trust in this family, I just knew the lads and I knew by the looks on their faces in that losing dressing-room last year. "My aim all year was to win the semi-final because I felt if we won the semi-final, no one would stop us in the final. Kilkenny are a super team, but I knew if the guys got back into that arena after what happened last year they wouldn't leave it go." Hat trick scorer Lar Corbett said after the game "It is no good coming up here and scoring three goals and losing to Kilkenny, the win, that is what it is all about. It is the whole year wrapped up in 70 minutes. What can you say? It is unbelievable".

Sunday Game analyst Cyril Farrell thought that Henry Shefflin's injury was a serious setback for Kilkenny, writing in the Irish Independent he said "credit where it's due, this was a marvellous performance by Tipp, they did to Kilkenny what the Cats have done to so many teams over the years by keeping the pace and intensity at a high level and by crowding the ball carrier". Former Tipperary player and manager Nicky English writing in the Irish Times thoughtthat Tipperary got a day when everything went right and the few breaks that any team needs, "Tipperary were quite magnificent in the intensity and skill they brought to Croke Park yesterday to finally prove that Kilkenny, a great team, weren’t invincible".

Former Tipperary manager Babs Keating, speaking on Newstalk's Breakfast Show defended his criticism of Liam Sheedy earlier during the season and claimed the Tipperary management has benefited from his controversial second stint in charge. "Maybe I passed a few comments about Liam Sheedy and the management structure based on what I went through in Tipperary and I made difficult decisions which might have helped Liam Sheedy in the success he had, Keating also stated that the win had dwarfed his own managerial victories and that of Nicky English in 2001. "It probably compares up there if not ahead of those wins in so far as that everyone feared Kilkenny and their dominance. This was a great watermark for the game of hurling."

== Civic reception ==
The Tipperary team arrived back to Thurles by train the next evening after the traditional stop at Our Ladies Children's Hospital with the Cup earlier in the day. They then boarded an open top bus for the journey to the reception at Semple Stadium where an estimated 40,000 supporters turned out to welcome the team home to a rainy Thurles. There was another huge crowd in Mullinahone the night after when Eoin Kelly, the first southern Tipperary man to captain Tipperary to All-Ireland senior success, brought the cup home.

== Awards ==
The nominations for the 2010 GAA All Stars Awards were announced on 24 September 2010. Tipperary had 14 players nominated for awards, winning captain Eoin Kelly was going for his sixth All-Star while final hat-trick scorer Lar Corbett was hoping to pick up his second award. Henry Shefflin was on course for a record 10th All-Star after also being nominated for a ninth successive time along with 11 other Kilkenny players. He was hoping to surpass the record jointly held by his fellow county-man DJ Carey and former Kerry footballer Pat Spillane, whom he joined on nine awards in 2009. At the awards ceremony on 15 October 2010, Tipperary won six All Star awards, Brendan Cummins, Paul Curran, Brendan Maher, Noel McGrath, Lar Corbett and Eoin Kelly won awards, while Kilkenny won five awards, Jackie Tyrrell, Tommy Walsh, JJ Delaney, Michael Fennelly and Richie Power. Lar Corbett was named All Stars Hurler of the year while Brendan Maher collected the All Stars Young hurler of the year award.

Tipperary's Lar Corbett and Brendan Maher were shortlisted, alongside Kilkenny's Michael Fennelly and Tommy Walsh, for the GPA Hurler of the Year award for 2010. On 5 November, Corbett was named as the GPA Hurler of the year for 2010, and will receive a new Opel Astra car worth €25,000. Corbett and Maher were joined in the nominations for the GPA team of the year by ten of their Tipperary teammates, Kilkenny had ten nominations in total. Tipperary won seven places on the GPA team of the year, all of their All Star award winners in addition to Pádraic Maher who was named at left-half back, replacing Kilkenny's JJ Delaney in the only difference to the 2010 All Star team.

== Aftermath ==
On 11 September 2010, six days after the Senior final, the Tipperary Under-21 Hurling team completed the double by winning the All-Ireland Under-21 Hurling Championship against Galway by 5–22 to 0–12 at Semple Stadium to claim their ninth title. Five members of the victorious senior starting team started for Tipperary in the Under-21 final, Pádraic Maher, Michael Cahill, Brendan Maher, Noel McGrath, and Patrick Maher. Senior substitutes Séamus Hennessy, Brian O'Meara and Michael Heffernan also started for the Under-21 team.

On 7 October 2010 it was announced that Liam Sheedy would be stepping down from his position as the Tipperary manager. Sheedy and his selectors, who found themselves working up to 16 hours a day during their three-year term, cited work commitments as the reason for stepping down and Sheedy thanked the board for their "top class" support. In December 2010, Sheedy was named the Philips Sports Manager of the Year for 2010 for managing Tipperary to their All Ireland win. In November 2010, Tipperary half back Declan Fanning announced his retirement from inter-county hurling. In December 2010, Kilkenny midfielder Derek Lyng also announced his retirement from inter-county hurling after nine years.
