= 2015 All-Ireland Senior Hurling Championship final =

2015 All-Ireland Senior Hurling Final
- Event: 2015 All-Ireland Senior Hurling Championship
Kilkenny	Galway
1-22	1-18
- Date: 6 September 2015
- Venue: Croke Park, Dublin
- Man of the Match: Michael Fennelly
- Referee: James Owens (Wexford)
- Weather: Cloudy; 14 °C (57 °F)

The 2015 All-Ireland Senior Hurling Championship Final, the 128th event of its kind and the culmination of the 2015 All-Ireland Senior Hurling Championship, was played at Croke Park in Dublin on 6 September 2015. Kilkenny retained their title beating Galway by 1-22 to 1-18. The win was the 36th All-Ireland title for Kilkenny and the 11th under Brian Cody.

The final was shown live in Ireland on RTÉ One as part of The Sunday Game live programme, presented by Michael Lyster from Croke Park, with studio analysis from Cyril Farrell, Henry Shefflin and Anthony Daly. Match commentary was provided by Ger Canning with analysis by Michael Duignan. The game was also shown live on Sky Sports, presented by Rachel Wyse and Brian Carney with studio analysis from J. J. Delaney, Ollie Canning and Jamesie O'Connor.

The match was the third most-watched event on Irish television in 2015, with an average audience of 739,600.

For the first time since 2011, the final did not go into a replay.

== Background ==
This was the 41st championship meeting between the two sides, with Kilkenny dominating the series with 29 victories. Galway had beaten Kilkenny on 9 occasions while there have been two drawn games. In their most recent meeting Kilkenny defeated Galway by 1-25 to 2-15 in the 2015 Leinster final on 5 July.

The two sides had previously played six times in All-Ireland finals, with Kilkenny once again dominating by winning four of the previous deciders (1975, 1979, 1993, 2012). Galway's lone All-Ireland defeat of Kilkenny came in 1987, while there has been one drawn decider.

Kilkenny were hoping to retain their All-Ireland crown and claim an 8th All-Ireland title in ten years. Victory would also ensure an 11th All-Ireland title under the management of Brian Cody and a 36th All-Ireland title over all. Galway were hoping to win their first All-Ireland title since 1988.

Kilkenny were favorites to win the match, priced at 1/2 with Paddy Power, with Galway priced at 2/1 and the draw at 9/1. If the match was a draw it would be the fourth year in a row that the match would have finished in a draw.

== Route to the final ==
=== Kilkenny ===
21 June 2015; 14:00; Leinster Semi-Final	Kilkenny	5-25 – 0-16	Wexford	Nowlan Park; Attendance: 19,134; Referee: D Kirwan (Cork)
21 June 2015; 14:00; Leinster Semi-Final	G Aylward (3-5), TJ Reid (1-7), R Hogan (1-5), E Larkin (0-3), J Power (0-2), C Buckley (0-1), M Fennelly (0-1), JJ Farrell (0-1).	Report	I Byrne (0-11), L Óg McGovern (0-2), D Redmond (0-2), A Shore (0-1).	Nowlan Park; Attendance: 19,134; Referee: D Kirwan (Cork)

5 July 2015; 16:00; Leinster Final	Galway	2-15 – 1-25	Kilkenny	Croke Park; Attendance: 32,954; Referee: J McGrath (Westmeath)
5 July 2015; 16:00; Leinster Final	J Canning (1-8, 7f), J Flynn (1-0), C Donnellan (0-3), J Glynn (0-1), C Mannion (0-1), D Burke (0-1), F Moore (0-1).	Report	TJ Reid (1-9, one '65, 5f), R Hogan (0-4), E Larkin (0-4), G Aylward (0-3), C Fennelly (0-2), W Walsh (0-2), C Fogarty (0-1).	Croke Park; Attendance: 32,954; Referee: J McGrath (Westmeath)

9 August 2015; 15:45; All-Ireland Semi-Final	Kilkenny	1-21 – 0-18	Waterford	Croke Park; Attendance: 41,112; Referee: B Gavin (Offaly)
9 August 2015; 15:45; All-Ireland Semi-Final	T. J. Reid (1-9, 0-6 frees), R Hogan (0-5), G Aylward (0-4), C Buckley, E Larkin, M Fennelly (0-1 each).	Report	M Shanahan (0-9, 6 frees, 1 65), C Dunford (0-4), A Gleeson (1 sideline) (0-3), S Bennett, K Moran (0-1 each).	Croke Park; Attendance: 41,112; Referee: B Gavin (Offaly)

=== Galway ===
31 May 2015; 14:00; Leinster Quarter-Final	Dublin	0-20 – 1-17	Galway	Croke Park; Attendance: 33,544; Referee: J McGrath (Westmeath)
31 May 2015; 14:00; Leinster Quarter-Final	D Treacy (0-11, 8 frees, 2 65s); M Schutte, D Sutcliffe (0-3 each); L Rushe (0-2); J McCaffrey (0-1).	Report	J Canning (0-6, 4 frees, 1 65); J Cooney (1-0); C Donnellan, C Mannion (0-3 each); J Flynn, A Harte (0-2 each); A Smith (0-1 each).	Croke Park; Attendance: 33,544; Referee: J McGrath (Westmeath)

6 June 2015; 16:45; Leinster Quarter-Final Replay	Galway	5-19 – 1-18	Dublin	O'Connor Park; Attendance: 14,077; Referee: B Gavin (Offaly)
6 June 2015; 16:45; Leinster Quarter-Final Replay	C Mannion 3-3, J Canning 2-3, J Flynn 0-9 (7f), A Harte, A Smith, C Donnellan and P Brehony 0-1 each.	Report	P Ryan 0-7 (3f, 3 65s), E Dillon 1-1, D O’Connell and D Treacy (1f) 0-2 each, S Lambert (f), R O’Dwyer, L Rushe, D Sutcliffe, M Schutte and C Boland 0-1 each.	O'Connor Park; Attendance: 14,077; Referee: B Gavin (Offaly)

20 June 2015; 17:00; Leinster Semi-Final	Galway	3-28 – 1-14	Laois	O'Connor Park; Attendance: ~5,000; Referee: F Horgan (Tipperary)
20 June 2015; 17:00; Leinster Semi-Final	J Canning: 1-15 (0-9f, 0-2 ‘65), D Glennon 1-2, J Coen 1-0, P Mannion, A Smith, David Burke, N Healy 0-2 each, J Hanbury, C Mannion, P Brehony 0-1 each .	Report	Z Keenan 0-5 (3f, 2’65), S Maher 1-1, P Purcell 0-3, P Whelan 0-2, J Campion, T Fitzgerald, C Dwyer 0-1 each.	O'Connor Park; Attendance: ~5,000; Referee: F Horgan (Tipperary)

5 July 2015; 16:00; Leinster Final	Galway	2-15 – 1-25	Kilkenny	Croke Park; Attendance: 32,954; Referee: J McGrath (Westmeath)
5 July 2015; 16:00; Leinster Final	J Canning (1-8, 7f), J Flynn (1-0), C Donnellan (0-3), J Glynn (0-1), C Mannion (0-1), D Burke (0-1), F Moore (0-1).	Report	TJ Reid (1-9, one '65, 5f), R Hogan (0-4), E Larkin (0-4), G Aylward (0-3), C Fennelly (0-2), W Walsh (0-2), C Fogarty (0-1).	Croke Park; Attendance: 32,954; Referee: J McGrath (Westmeath)

26 July 2015; 16:00; All-Ireland Quarter-Final	Galway	2-28 – 0-22	Cork	Semple Stadium; Referee: J Ownes (Wexford)
26 July 2015; 16:00; All-Ireland Quarter-Final	C Mannion (0-7); J Glynn, C Whelan (1-2 each); J Canning (0-5, 2 frees, 1 sideline, 1 65); J Flynn (0-3); A Harte (0-2); David Burke, C Donnellan (0-2 each); A Smith, J Cooney, N Healy (0-1 each).	Report	P Horgan (0-9, 6 frees, 1 65); C Lehane, S Harnedy (0-3 each); D Kearney (0-2); C Murphy, B Lawton, P O'Sullivan, A Cadogan, A Walsh (0-1 each).	Semple Stadium; Referee: J Ownes (Wexford)

16 August 2015; 16:00; All-Ireland Semi-Final	Tipperary	3-16 - 0-26	Galway	Croke Park; Attendance: 58,495; Referee: B Kelly (Westmeath)
16 August 2015; 16:00; All-Ireland Semi-Final	Seamus Callanan (3-9, 0-3 frees, 0-1 penalty, 0-1 '65); John O'Dwyer (0-2, 0-1 free); Jason Forde, Brendan Maher, Patrick Maher, Conor O'Mahony, Noel McGrath (0-1)	Report	Joe Canning (0-10, 0-6 frees, 0-1 '65, 0-1 sideline); Cathal Mannion (0-5); Jason Flynn (0-5, 0-2 frees); David Burke, Conor Whelan (0-2); Shane Moloney, Andy Smith (0-1)	Croke Park; Attendance: 58,495; Referee: B Kelly (Westmeath)

== Pre-match ==
=== Jubilee team ===
The Cork All-Ireland-winning team of 1990, who won the title following a 5-15 to 2-21 defeat of Galway, were the jubilee team that were presented to the crowd before the final.

=== Ticketing ===
With a stadium capacity of 82,300, the 32 individual county boards received 60,000 tickets. Schools and third level colleges got 2,500 tickets, while season ticket holders were entitled to 5,500 tickets. 1,000 tickets were given to overseas clubs. The Camogie, Ladies' Football, Handball and Rounders Associations were each allocated about 200 tickets, as were the jubilee teams and mini-7s which played at half-time.

Galway's ticket allocation was expected to be around 7,000 as the county was contesting both the senior and minor All-Ireland finals. 5,000 tickets went to Kilkenny as it is a smaller county with fewer clubs, while another 1,000 will be given to clubs in Tipperary due to their participation in the All-Ireland minor final.

The tickets that were allocated to the participating counties were divided among the clubs. Senior hurling clubs got the biggest allocation while intermediate and junior clubs also got a smaller share. Football clubs received a lower percentage. The allocation was based on the number of members and the number of teams in each club.

The match was shown live on a big screen at Eyre Square in Galway.

=== Related events ===
The 2015 All-Ireland Minor Hurling Final between Galway and Tipperary was played as a curtain-raiser to the senior final. Galway won the game on a 4-13 to 1-16 scoreline.

== Match summary ==
=== Officials ===
On 24 August 2015 the officials were chosen for the final by the GAA, led by Wexford referee James Owens. His umpires on the day were James Dunbar, John Clarke, David Owens (Askamore) and Ian Plunkett (Marshalstown). Tipperary’s Johnny Ryan was the standby referee. The other linesman was James McGrath (Westmeath) and the sideline official was Owen Elliott (Antrim). Owens has also refereed the 2007 All-Ireland minor final, the 2008 All-Ireland under-21 final and the 2015 All-Ireland club final.

=== Team news ===
Both Kilkenny and Galway named unchanged sides for final. Jackie Tyrrell and Richie Power both returned to the Kilkenny squad after recovering from injury.

=== Summary ===
Joe Canning got the first score of the game from a close-range free after two minutes. Johnny Coen blocked a goal-bound shot from Walter Walsh after four minutes with the scores level at two points each. In the fourteenth minute with Galway leading by two points, Walter Walsh burst in from the right and hand passed to TJ Reid who shot low into the back of the net to put Kilkeeny into a one-point lead. After twenty three minutes, Joe Canning pointed another free to put Galway back in front by one. Jason Flynn then pointed a free from long range to increase the lead to two points a minute later. Jason Flynn got his third point of the game in the twenty eighth minute to put four between the sides. With a minute to half time, a dangerous high foul by Johnny Coen on Colin Fennelly earned him a yellow card when most people including all members of the Sunday Game panel expected a red card. Half-time score was Kilkenny 1-8 Galway 0-14. The first score of the second half came after four minutes with Conor Fogarty scoring from a free. TJ Reid then scored with another free and then a sixty five to level the scores. David Collins then got a point to put Galway back in front before Richie Hogan again got the equalizer. After forty nine minutes, Conor Whelan with the help of HawkEye put just one point between the sides with a shot from a very tight angle on the right. With six minutes to go Colin Fennelly pointed after Joe Canning had earlier missed from a free to put Kilkenny four points in front. Conor Whelan missed a goal chance for Galway with four minutes to go when his weak shot went low passed the left post. Colin Fennelly then got a second point to put five between them with two minutes to go. Two quick points from Michael Fennelly and Walter Walsh put seven between them before Joe Canning scored a goal with a low shot to the net from a free for the final score of the game. The final score is Kilkenny 1-22 Galway 1-18.

== Match details ==
6 September 2015
15:30

Kilkenny	1-22 - 1-18	Galway
TJ Reid (1-7, 0-5 frees, 0-2 65s); R Hogan, E Larkin, G Aylward, C Fennelly, M Fennelly, W Walsh (0-2 each); J Coen (own point), C Fogarty, P Walsh (0-1 each).	Report	J Canning (1-8, 1-5 frees); J Flynn (0-4, 3 frees); C Whelan, D Collins (0-2 each); C Donnellan, David Burke (0-1 each).

Croke Park, Dublin
Attendance: 82,300
Referee: James Owens (Wexford)

Kilkenny	Galway

GK	1	Eoin Murphy
B	2	Paul Murphy
B	3	Joey Holden (c)
B	4	Shane Prendergast
HB	5	Pádraig Walsh
HB	6	Kieran Joyce
HB	7	Cillian Buckley
MF	8	Michael Fennelly
MF	9	Conor Fogarty
FW	10	Colin Fennelly
FW	11	Richie Hogan	(substituted off) 60'
FW	12	T. J. Reid
FW	13	Ger Aylward	(substituted off) 62'
FW	14	Walter Walsh
FW	15	Eoin Larkin
Substitutes Used:
	24	Richie Power	(substituted on) 60'
	23	John Power	(substituted on) 62'
Unused Substitutes:
	16	Richie Reid
	17	Jackie Tyrrell
	18	Rob Lennon
	19	Michael Walsh
	20	Diarmuid Cody
	21	Lester Ryan
	22	Joe Lyng
	25	Jonjo Farrell
	26	Matthew Ruth
Manager:
Brian Cody

GK	1	Colm Callanan
B	2	Johnny Coen
B	3	John Hanbury
B	4	Pádraic Mannion
HB	5	Aidan Harte	(substituted off) 24'
HB	6	Iarla Tannian
HB	7	Daithí Burke
MF	8	Andy Smith (c)	(substituted off) 56'
MF	9	David Burke
FW	10	Conor Whelan
FW	11	Cyril Donnellan	(substituted off) 64'
FW	12	Jonathan Glynn
FW	13	Jason Flynn	(substituted off) 65'
FW	14	Joe Canning
FW	15	Cathal Mannion
Substitutes Used:
	22	David Collins (c)	(substituted on) 24'
	21	Conor Cooney	(substituted on) 56'
	20	Greg Lally	(substituted on) 64'
	23	Shane Moloney	(substituted on) 65'
Unused Substitutes:
	16	James Skehil
	17	Fergal Moore
	18	Paul Killeen
	19	Gearóid McInerney
	24	Niall Healy
	25	Joseph Cooney
	26	Brian Molloy
Manager:
Anthony Cunningham

=== Reaction ===
Kilkenny manager Brian Cody was happy with the second-half performance from his players after trailing by three points, speaking to RTÉ Sport he said "In the first-half, Galway were outstanding, They really hit us, they really knocked us back in different ways and we struggled to get into our rhythm. We went in at half-time three points down and that’s not a bad position to be in and I thought the second-half response from our players was magnificent. I thought the relentless spirit, attitude and hurling that they showed was top class and it was a hard fought victory, there’s no doubt about that. “ Colin Fennelly revealed that a half-time speech from Jackie Tyrrell provided Kilkenny with the inspiration they needed in the second-half, saying "“Jackie Tyrrell at half-time, the speech he made was absolutely amazing, Jackie may have only one or two years left maybe and young lads hearing that coming on, it’s amazing. His speech at half-time was absolutely unbelievable, He spoke. Richie Power spoke and Michael Fennelly spoke and they’re probably the three senior lads of the team and whatever they said went through to us and we came out in the second-half and did the business."

Galway manager Anthony Cunningham speaking to RTÉ Sport after the game said "Unfortunately we came out second-best there in the second-half, having had a nice lead there at half-time, Congratulations to Kilkenny, they were the better team there in the second-half. We just had a few unforced errors there really; we only returned 1-4 in the second-half, But no fault to any of our players. They gave it some, some effort, it was some battle there. A few unforced errors there in the second-half, maybe a couple of decisions went against us at the start of the second-half. Kilkenny, with all their experience and their guile and their craft, a tremendous team, they punished us."

Nicky English writing in the Irish Times was impressed by how Kilkenny performed in the second-half saying "Whatever Cody said at half- time worked because Kilkenny came out a different team. They’d reorganised themselves and they came back out and dictated the pace from the word go. They closed the gap straight away and got into the lead and were well on top in all areas. They closed down the space that Galway had been able to create in the full-forward line and Galway were reduced to scraps."

Cyril Farrell writing in the Irish Independent called it a tough defeat for Galway to take especially after a great first half in which they took the game to Kilkenny saying "Unfortunately for Galway, Cody's team got the upper hand in those vital early stages of the second half and drove on to dominate the match. The problem was they were up against a team managed by the greatest hurling manager in the game's history and we knew that Kilkenny would come out with all guns blazing in the first ten to 15 minutes of the second half."

Highlights of the final were shown on The Sunday Game programme which aired at 9:30pm that night on RTÉ Two and was presented by Des Cahill with analysis from Donal Óg Cusack, Liam Sheedy, and Ger Loughnane. On the man of the match award shortlist were Michael Fennelly, T. J. Reid and David Burke, with Michael Fennelly winning the award which was presented by GAA president Aogán Ó Fearghail at the City West hotel in Dublin.

=== Trophy presentation ===
Kilkenny captain Joey Holden accepted the Liam MacCarthy Cup from GAA president Aogán Ó Fearghail in the Hogan Stand.

=== Celebrations ===
The Kilkenny team returned home on the 7 September were the homecoming event was held at Nowlan Park in Kikenny City at 5:45pm where up to 12,000 people attended. The team arrived at Kilkenny Castle before boarding an open-top bus for the journey to Nowlan Park.
