= 2014 All-Ireland Senior Hurling Championship final =

2014 All-Ireland Senior Hurling Final
- Event: 2014 All-Ireland Senior Hurling Championship
Kilkenny	Tipperary
3-22 2-17	1-28 2-14
- Date: 7 September 2014 (first game); 27 September 2014 (replay)
- Venue: Croke Park, Dublin
- Man of the Match: Richie Hogan (first game); Kieran Joyce (replay)
- Referee: Barry Kelly (first game); Brian Gavin (replay)
- Attendance: 82,179 (first game); 81,753 (replay) t
- Weather: Sunny (first game); 16 °C (61 °F); Mostly sunny (replay); 19 °C (66 °F)

The 2014 All-Ireland Senior Hurling Championship Final, the deciding game of the 2014 All-Ireland Senior Hurling Championship, was played on 7 September 2014 at Croke Park, Dublin. The final ended - for the third year in a row - in a draw. The replay was held on 27 September 2014.

The final was the seventh national final, between League and Championship, out of a possible 12, that Kilkenny and Tipperary had met in since 2009.

The final was shown live in Ireland on RTÉ One as part of The Sunday Game live programme, presented by Michael Lyster from Croke Park, with studio analysis from Cyril Farrell, Tomás Mulcahy and Ger Loughnane. Match commentary was provided by Ger Canning with analysis by Michael Duignan. The game was also shown live on Sky Sports, presented by Rachel Wyse and Brian Carney.

The first match finished in a draw for the third year in a row after no draws since the 1959 final. The final has been described by many as the greatest final in history and also the greatest hurling match in history.

Tipperary had a free from 97 metres out in injury time with the scores level. John O'Dwyer took the free which was hit just wide to the right and required confirmation from Hawk-eye that it was wide.

The replay was held on 27 September and was won by Kilkenny on a 2–17 to 2-14 scoreline. It was their 35th All-Ireland title and the 10th senior All-Ireland of Brian Cody’s managerial career along with the 10th All-Ireland of Henry Shefflin’s playing career.

== Background ==
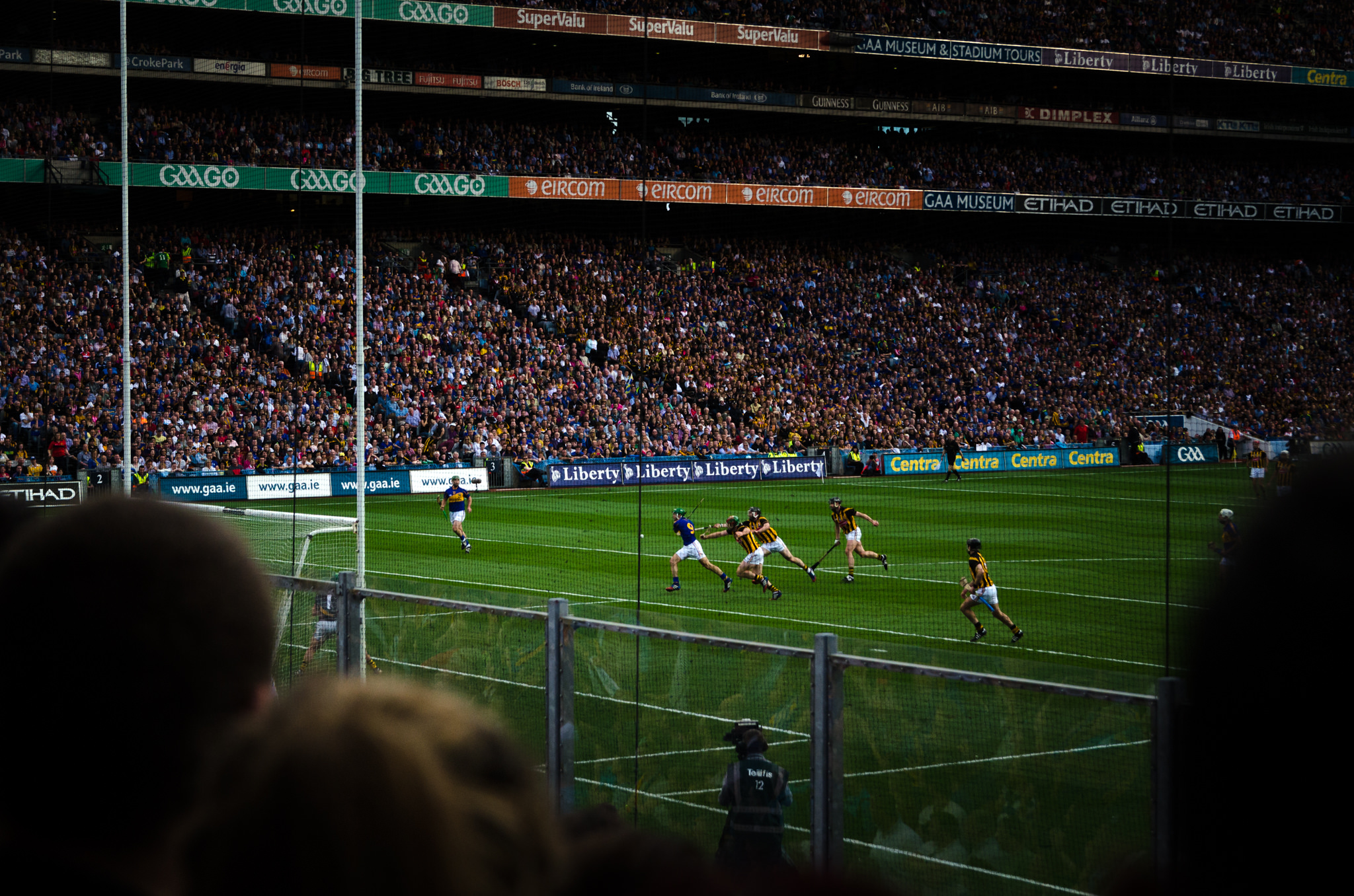
2014 All-Ireland Hurling Final: Kilkenny v Tipperary at Croke Park

It was the sixth successive year that the counties had played each other in the championship, with Kilkenny winning 4 times. Kilkenny went into the final having won 34 All Ireland titles, including 9 titles in the previous 13 years (2000, 2002, 2003, 2006, 2007, 2008, 2009, 2011, and 2012). Meanwhile, Tipperary had won 26 titles, including 2 titles over the same period (2001 and 2010). The teams had played each other 24 times in the championship, the first time being in 1887, with Kilkenny winning 11 times and Tipperary winning on 13 occasions.

== Route to the Final ==
=== Kilkenny ===
7 June 2014
19:00
Quarter-final

Kilkenny	5-32 - 1-18	Offaly
E Larkin 2-4, C Fennelly 1-6, TJ Reid 0-6 (2fs), M Kelly 2-0, W Walsh 0-4, M Fennelly, R Hogan, A Fogarty 0-3 each, L Ryan 0-2, P Murphy 0-1.	report	B Carroll 1-10 (6fs), S Ryan, S Dooley, D Currams, C Parlon, J Bergin, R Hanniffy, S Quirke, C Mahon 0-1 each.

Nowlan Park
Referee: J Owens (Wexford)

22 June 2014
16:00
Semi-final

Galway	5-16 - 3-22	Kilkenny
C Cooney (2-07, 0-04f, 0-02 ‘65), J Canning (2-03, 2-00 pens), N Burke (1-02), J Flynn (0-02), A Smith (0-01), J Glynn (0-01).	report	TJ Reid (1-08, 0-07f), C Fennelly (1-03), R Hogan (0-05), E Larkin (1-01), P Walsh (0-02), T Walsh (0-01), A Fogarty (0-01), H Shefflin (0-01).

O'Connor Park
Referee: J Ryan (Tipperary)

28 June 2014
19:00
Semi-final replay

Galway	1-17 - 3-19	Kilkenny
C Cooney 0-11 (0-9 fs), J Flynn 1-1, J Canning, 0-1 (0-1 lineball), I Tannian, D Burke, A Smith 0-1.	report	TJ Reid 2-11 (0-10 fs), A Fogarty 1-1, P Walsh 0-3, R Hogan 0-2, T Walsh, E Larkin 0-1.

O'Connor Park
Referee: J Owens (Wexford)

6 July 2014
16:00
Final

Dublin	1-09 - 0-24	Kilkenny
C Cronin (1-01), A McCrabbe (0-03, 0-03f), D O'Callaghan, D Sutcliffe, C McCormack (0-01 each), C Keaney (0-01, 0-01 pen)	report	TJ Reid (0-10, 0-04f, 0-04'65), C Fennelly, H Shefflin (0-03 each), P Walsh (0-02), R Hogan (0-02, 0-01f), B Hogan, W Walsh, J Power, A Fogarty (0-01 each)

Croke Park
Attendance: 32,567
Referee: B Kelly (Westmeath)

10 August 2014
15:30
Semi-final

Kilkenny	2-13 - 0-17	Limerick
TJ Reid (0-5, frees); C Fennelly (0-4); R Hogan, R Power (1-0 each); P Walsh, M Fennelly (0-2 each).	Report	S Dowling (0-7, 4 frees, 1 65); D Hannon (0-5); G Mulcahy (0-2); D O’Grady, D Breen, S Tobin (0-1 each).

Croke Park
Attendance: 45,478
Referee: J McGrath (Westmeath)

=== Tipperary ===
1 June
16:15
Munster Semi-final

Tipperary	2–16 – 2–18	Limerick
G Ryan 1-2, Patrick Maher 1-0, S Callanan 0-5 (3f), J O’Dwyer 0-5 (1f), N McGrath, N O’Meara, L Corbett & D Maher 0-1 each.	Report	S Dowling 2-9 (1-9f), D O’Grady & K Downes 0-2 each, S Hickey, P Browne, D Hannon, G Mulcahy & T Ryan 0-1 each.

Semple Stadium
Attendance: 24,962
Referee: B Kelly (Westmeath)

5 July
19:00
All Ireland Qualifier Round 1

Tipperary	3–25 – 4–13	Galway
S Callanan (3-08, 0-07f), J O’Dwyer (0-06), N McGrath (0-05), L Corbett (0-02), J Woodlock, Patrick Maher, K Bergin, S McGrath (0-01 each	Report	J Glynn (2-00), J Canning (0-05, 1sl), C Cooney (0-04f), J Flynn, David Burke (1-00 each), C Mannion (0-2), P Brehony, D Glennon (0-01 each

Semple Stadium
Attendance: 18,467
Referee: C Lyons (Cork)

12 July
19:00
All Ireland Qualifier Round 2

Tipperary	5-25 - 1-20	Offaly
S Callanan 2-10 (0-7f), L Corbett 2-2, Patrick Maher 1-1, K Bergin 0-4, D Maher 0-2, J Woodlock, J O'Dwyer, N McGrath, E Kelly, J Forde & T Stapleton 0-1 each	Report	B Carroll 0-13 (10f), C Egan 1-0, J Bergin 0-3 (1f, 1 65), C Parlon, S Dooley, S Ryan & D Currams 0-1 each

O'Moore Park
Referee: Alan Kelly (Galway)

27 July
16:00
All Ireland Quarter-final

Tipperary	2-23 - 0-16	Dublin
S Callanan (0-11, 7 frees, 2 ‘65’s); J O’Dwyer (2-2, 0-1 free); G Ryan (0-3); L Corbett (0-2); S McGrath, J Woodlock, Patrick Maher, N McGrath, S Bourke, (all 0-1)	Report	Alan McCrabbe 0-5 (0-5f), Conal Keaney, Paul Ryan (0-1f, 0-1 ’65) 0-2 each, Eamon Dillon, Liam Rushe (0-1f), Ryan O’Dwyer, Johnny McCaffrey, Danny Sutcliffe, David Treacy, David O’Callaghan 0-1 each

Semple Stadium
Attendance: 43,088
Referee: Brian Gavin (Offaly)

17 August
15:30
All Ireland Semi-final

Tipperary	2-18 - 1-11	Cork
S Callanan 2-4 (0-1f), J O'Dwyer 0-6, S McGrath, J Woodlock 0-3, N McGrath (0-2)	Report	C Lehane (0-4); R O’Shea (1-0); A Nash, P Horgan (0-2, frees each); A Cadogan, S Harnedy, A Walsh (0-1 each).

Croke Park
Attendance: 68,728
Referee: J Owens (Wexford)

== Pre-match - Drawn game ==
For the first time ever Etihad Airways showed live coverage of the final on their flights.

Kilkenny were favorites to win the final, priced at 8/11 with Paddy Power, with Tipperary priced at 6/4 and the draw at 10/1.

The Tipperary team that won the 1989 All-Ireland Final were presented to the crowd before the match to mark 25 years.

=== Referee ===
Westmeath official Barry Kelly was named as the referee for the 2014 All-Ireland final on 25 August. It will be the fourth time he has refereed a senior final as he did the drawn 2012 final between Kilkenny and Galway, the 2008 final between Kilkenny and Waterford and the 2006 final between Kilkenny and Cork.

=== Tickets ===
Tickets being sold on black market websites are ranging in price from €250 and €375 each, depending on their location a week before the final. Unusually for an All Ireland Final there was a public sale of tickets on the Friday of the game.

=== Team news ===
The Tipperary team was named on the evening of 4 September after their last training session. The team is unchanged from the semi-final win against Cork with Michael Cahill failing to regain the number four shirt since a knee injury kept him out of the win against Dublin. Pádraic Maher, though named at full-back, is expected to line out at left half-back, with James Barry going to full-back. Captain Brendan Maher is expected to start at centre-back. Five Tipperary players will be playing in their first All-Ireland final, Darren Gleeson, Cathal Barrett, James Barry, Kieran Bergin and John O’Dwyer. Walter Walsh was the surprise inclusion in the Kilkeeny line-up that was announced on the evening of the 5 September, with three changes in all from the side that defeated Limerick in the semi-final. Eoin Murphy got the goalkeeper position with Walsh replacing Padraig Walsh, while Richie Power replaced Mark Kelly at full-forward.

== Match details ==
7 September 2014
15:30
Final

Kilkenny	3-22 - 1-28	Tipperary
TJ Reid 1-8 (6f), R Power 2-1, R Hogan 0-6, E Larkin 0-2, C Fennelly, M Fennelly, C Fogarty, W Walsh, B Hogan 0-1 each.	Report	S Callanan 0-7 (2f), J O’Dwyer 0-7 (2f), Patrick Maher 1-1, N McGrath 0-4, S McGrath, L Corbett 0-2 each, J Woodlock, G Ryan, M Cahill, P Stapleton, J Forde 0-1 each.

Croke Park, Dublin
Attendance: 82,179
Referee: Barry Kelly

Kilkenny	Tipperary

KILKENNY:
1	Eoin Murphy
2	Paul Murphy
3	J. J. Delaney
4	Jackie Tyrrell
5	Joey Holden
6	Brian Hogan
7	Cillian Buckley
8	Richie Hogan
9	Conor Fogarty
10	Michael Fennelly
11	Colin Fennelly
12	T. J. Reid
13	Walter Walsh
14	Richie Power
15	Eoin Larkin
Substitutes:
23	Aidan Fogarty for W. Walsh (48 mins)
19	Pádraig Walsh for J. Holden (61 mins)
22	Henry Shefflin for C. Fennelly (66 mins)
26	John Power for R. Hogan (71 mins)
Manager:
Brian Cody

TIPPERARY:
1	Darren Gleeson
2	Cathal Barrett
3	Pádraic Maher
4	Paddy Stapleton
5	Brendan Maher (captain)
6	James Barry
7	Kieran Bergin
8	Shane McGrath
9	James Woodlock
10	Gearóid Ryan
11	Patrick Maher
12	John O'Dwyer
13	Noel McGrath
14	Séamus Callanan
15	Lar Corbett
Substitutes:
18	Michael Cahill for G. Ryan (49 mins)
21	Eoin Kelly for J. Woodlock (63 mins)
20	Jason Forde for S. McGrath (67 mins)
23	John O'Brien for S. Callanan (70 mins)
Manager:
Eamon O'Shea

Man of the Match:
Richie Hogan

Linesmen:
Colm Lyons (Corcaigh)
Brian Gavin (Uíbh Fhailí)

Sideline Official
Cathal McAllister (Corcaigh)

Umpires
Michael Coyle
Seamus O’Brien
Paddy Walsh
Paul Reville

=== Reaction ===
Tipperary's Pádraic Maher said that he knew the injury-time attempt from John O’Dwyer was wide before being confirmed by Hawk-Eye saying "“I was standing right behind Bubbles. I stood right behind his free and I thought it was for three-quarters of the way going over the bar, but it just curled off at the finish. I didn’t even look up at the Hawk Eye because I f***ing knew it was gone wide.Excuse my language, but that’s just the ups and downs of the game. It was fantastic. It must have been some game to watch and it was great to be a part of it. It’s a big game again in three weeks’ time and we'll just try and come out the right side of the result.”

Tipperary manager Eamon O'Shea was focusing on the positives after the draw saying ""I feel I was a participant in a brilliant game," "Of course you feel drained, you try to win the game right until the end, but I just felt the occasion in terms of the game was just one of those was games..."I don't know what it looked like when you're dispassionate...but I just felt it was one of those games, like in 2009 (All-Ireland Final which Kilkenny won), it was just one of those games where you felt it was just good to be there." O'Shea also thought that John O'Dwyer's late free had gone over the bar saying " "I felt he had a chance," I thought it was over but obviously HawkEye said no. He got a great strike on it and he was unlucky." "I'm looking forward to the next day," "When you're involved in a game like that, from my perspective, you just try and win the game right until the end. You don't get a chance to get too emotional about it so I'm just looking forward to the next day, "I thought they (Tipperary) did really well today. They worked really hard, they believed in what they were doing. We could have won it, we might have lost it because we were playing against a fantastic team."

Highlights of the final were shown on The Sunday Game programme which aired at 9:30pm that night on RTÉ Two and was presented by Des Cahill with analysis from Dónal Óg Cusack, Liam Sheedy, and Eddie Brennan. On the man of the match award shortlist were Richie Hogan, John O'Dwyer and Cathal Barrett, with Richie Hogan winning the award.

== Pre-match - Replay ==
It was announced right after the drawn match that the replay would take place on Saturday, 27 September at 5pm at Croke park.

The drawn match was the highest scoring 70-minute final since being introduced in 1975, and the first time in championship history that a total of 31 points wasn't enough to win the final. It was also the first time in history that Kilkenny and Tipperary drew in a championship game.

Kilkenny were slight favorites to win the replay, priced at 10/11 with Paddy Power, with Tipperary priced at 6/5 and the draw at 9/1.

=== Tickets ===
The GAA announced on 8 September that ticket prices for the replay would be reduced with stand tickets reduced to €50 from €80 and terrace tickets priced at €25.

=== Referee ===
Offaly official Brian Gavin was named as the referee for the replay on 10 September. It was the third time he has refereed a senior final as he did the 2011 final between the same two teams and the drawn 2013 final between Clare and Cork. Wexford's James Owens was the standby referee with James McGrath as the other linesman, while the sideline official was Alan Kelly from Galway.

Unlike the 2013 All Ireland Final between Cork and Clare where Gavin played 30 seconds over the added on time in which time Clare scored an equalizing point Gavin did not allow any additional time in this game.

=== Team News ===
Both teams for the replay were announced on 25 September with Kilkenny making three changes to the team. John Power came in to replace Walter Walsh, Padraig Walsh came in at wing-back in place of Joey Holden while Kieran Joyce replaced Brian Hogan. Tipperary made no changes to their team and started with the same fifteen.

== Match details ==
=== Summary ===
Tipperary scored the first goal of the game in the 28th minute when Lar Corbett passed to the left to Séamus Callanan who passed the ball past the goalkeeper and into the net. Tipperary were leading the game by two points at half time on a 1–7 to 0-8 scoreline. Richie Power scored a goal for Kilkenny on 59 minutes shooting low to the net after catching a high ball, which put Kilkenny four points ahead. John Power then got a second goal four minutes later turning the ball home after an initial save from Darren Gleeson to put Kilkenny into a six-point lead. Seamus Callanan got his second goal a minute from the end of normal time shooting low to the net on the ground to leave only two between the teams. Colin Fennelly then got an injury-time point which extended Kilkenny's lead to three which is how the match finished. Kilkenny won the replay on a 2–17 to 2-14 scoreline. It was their 35th All-Ireland title and the 10th senior All-Ireland of Brian Cody’s managerial career the 10th All-Ireland of Henry Shefflin’s playing career.

27 September 2014
17:00
Final Replay

Kilkenny	2-17 - 2-14	Tipperary
TJ Reid 0-5(5f), R Power 1-1 (1 ’65′), J Power 1-1, C Fennelly 0-3, R Hogan 0-2, M Fennelly 0-2, E Larkin 0-2, P Walsh 0-1	Report	S Callanan 2-5 (4f, 0-1 pen), J O’Dywer 0-3 (1 ’65′), S McGrath 0-3, N McGrath 0-2, B Maher 0-1

Croke Park, Dublin
Attendance: 81,753
Referee: Brian Gavin

Kilkenny	Tipperary

KILKENNY:
1	Eoin Murphy
2	Paul Murphy
3	J. J. Delaney
4	Jackie Tyrrell
5	Pádraig Walsh
6	Kieran Joyce
7	Cillian Buckley
8	Richie Hogan
9	Conor Fogarty
10	Michael Fennelly
11	Colin Fennelly
12	Eoin Larkin
13	Richie Power
14	T. J. Reid
15	John Power
Substitutes:
22	Henry Shefflin for R.Hogan (58 mins)
20	Lester Ryan (Captain) for M Fennelly (67 mins)
Manager:
Brian Cody

TIPPERARY:
1	Darren Gleeson
2	Cathal Barrett
3	Pádraic Maher
4	Paddy Stapleton
5	Brendan Maher (captain)
6	James Barry
7	Kieran Bergin
8	Shane McGrath
9	James Woodlock
10	Gearóid Ryan
11	Patrick Maher
12	John O'Dwyer
13	Noel McGrath
14	Séamus Callanan
15	Lar Corbett
Substitutes:
18	Michael Cahill for S. McGrath (56 mins)
24	Conor O'Mahony for G.Ryan (64 mins)
17	Shane Bourke for L Corbett (65 mins)
17	Jason Forde for N McGrath (67 mins)
23	John O'Brien for J O’Dwyer (70 mins)
Manager:
Eamon O'Shea

Man of the Match:
Kieran Joyce

Linesmen:
James Owens (Loch Garman)
James McGrath (An Iarmhí)

Sideline Official
Alan Kelly (Gaillimh)

Umpires
Michael Gavin
David Gavin
William Flynn
PJ Lawlor

=== Trophy presentation ===
Kilkenny captain Lester Ryan accepted the Liam MacCarthy Cup from GAA president Liam O'Neill in the Hogan Stand and gave a speech which was delivered completely in the Irish language.

=== Celebrations ===
The Kilkenny team returned home on the 28 September were the homecoming event was held at Nowlan Park in Kikenny City at 4.30pm. Around 15,000 people turned up to celebrate the victory as the team made their way to Nowlan Park on an open top bus.
