= Conor Fogarty =

Irish hurler (born 1990)

Personal information
- Native name: Conchúir Ó Fogartaigh (Irish)
- Born: 12 May 1990 (age 36) Castlecomer, County Kilkenny, Ireland
- Occupation: Company director
- Height: 1.75 m (5 ft 9 in)

Sport
- Sport: Hurling
- Position: Midfield
Club
- Years: Club
- Erin's Own
Club titles
- Kilkenny titles: 0
College
- Years: College
- 2008-2012: University of Limerick
College titles
- Fitzgibbon titles: 0
Inter-county*
Years	County	Apps (scores)
2011-2024	Kilkenny	35 (0-17)
Inter-county titles
- Leinster titles: 8
- All-Irelands: 4
- NHL: 4
- All Stars: 0
- *Inter County team apps and scores correct as of 17:48, 3 August 2019.

Conor Fogarty (born 12 May 1990) is an Irish hurler who plays for Kilkenny Senior Championship club Erin's Own and at previously at inter-county level with the Kilkenny senior hurling team. He currently lines out as a right wing-back.

== Playing career ==
=== Castlecomer Community School ===
Fogarty first came to prominence as a hurler with Castlecomer Community School. Having played in every grade as a hurler, he was eventually called up to the college's senior team. On 18 March 2007, he lined out at right wing-back when Castlecomer Community School defeated Kilkenny CBS by 0–11 to 0–06 to win the Leinster Championship.

=== Erin's Own ===
Fogarty joined the Erin's Own club at a young age and played in all grades at juvenile and underage levels. On 26 October 2008, he lined out at midfield when Erin's Own faced Dicksboro in the Kilkenny Minor Championship final. Fogarty was switched to centre-back and produced what has been described as "one of the greatest individual displays ever witnessed in a minor final". He ended the game with a winners' medal following the 1–11 to 0–11 victory.

On 19 October 2008, Fogarty was at midfield when Erin's Own faced Danesfort in the final of the Kilkenny Intermediate Championship. He ended the game with a winners' medal following the 2–10 to 1–10 victory.

=== Kilkenny ===
==== Minor and under-21 ====
Fogarty first played for Kilkenny as a member of the minor team during the 2008 Leinster Championship. He won a Leinster Championship medal on 6 July 2008 after lining out at centre-back in Kilkenny's 1–19 to 0–12 defeat of Wexford in the final. Fogarty was switched to left wing-back for the All-Ireland final against Galway on 7 September 2008. He ended the game with a winners' medal following the 3–06 to 0–13 victory.

Fogarty was drafted onto the Kilkenny under-21 team in advance of the Leinster Championship and made his first appearance on 20 May 2009 when he lined out at left corner-back in a 1–21 to 1–10 defeat of Laois. He won a Leinster Under-21 Hurling Championship medal at left corner-back on 15 July 2009 following Kilkenny's 2–20 to 1–09 defeat of Dublin in the final. Fogarty was again at left corner-back when Kilkenny suffered a 0–15 to 0–14 defeat by Clare in the All-Ireland final on 13 September 2009.

Fogarty was eligible for the under-21 grade for a third and final season in 2011. He made his final appearance in the grade on 7 June 2011 when he lined out at left wing-back in the 1–16 to 2–12 defeat by Wexford.

==== Intermediate ====
Fogarty was added to the Kilkenny intermediate team for the 2009 Leinster Championship. He made his first appearance for the team on 24 June 2009 when he lined out at left wing-back in a 1–13 to 0–13 defeat of Dublin. On 19 July 2009, Fogarty won a Leinster Championship medal following a 0–12 to 0–11 defeat of Wexford in the final. Fogarty was switched to left corner-back when Kilkenny faced Cork in the All-Ireland final. He ended the game on the losing side following a 2–23 to 0–16 defeat.

==== Senior ====
Fogarty was added to the Kilkenny senior team in advance of the 2011 National League. He made his first appearance for the team on 20 February 2011 when he lined out at right corner-back in a 0–14 to 1–10 defeat of Cork. On 3 July 2011, Fogarty won a Leinster Championship medal as a non-playing substitute following Kilkenny's 4–17 to 1–15 defeat of Dublin in the final. He was again selected amongst the substitutes for the All-Ireland final against Tipperary on 4 September 2011. Fogarty ended the game with a winners' medal following the 2–17 to 1–16 victory.

On 6 May 2012, Fogarty won a National League medal as an unused substitute following Kilkenny's 3–21 to 0–16 defeat of Cork in the final. He was later included on the panel for the Leinster Championship and was an unused substitute on 8 July 2012 when Kilkenny suffered a 2–21 to 2–11 defeat by Galway in the final. On 19 August 2012, Fogarty made his championship debut when he came on as a 67th-minute substitute for Aidan Fogarty in a 4–24 to 1-15 All-Ireland semi-final defeat of Tipperary. On 9 September 2012, he was amongst the substitutes when Kilkenny drew 2–13 to 0–19 with Galway in the All-Ireland final. On 30 September 2012, Fogarty won his second All-Ireland medal as an unused substitute following Kilkenny's 3–22 to 3–11 defeat of Galway in the All-Ireland final replay.

On 5 May 2013, Fogarty was listed as a substitute when Kilkenny faced Tipperary in the National League final. He remained on the bench for the entire game but collected a second successive winners' medal following the 2–17 to 0–20 victory.

On 4 May 2014, Fogarty was selected on the bench when Kilkenny faced Tipperary in a second successive National League final. He ended the game with a third successive winners' medal as an unused substitute following the 2–25 to 1–27 victory. On 6 July 2014, Fogarty won a second Leinster Championship medal - his first on the field of play - after lining out at midfield in Kilkenny's 0–24 to 1–09 defeat of Dublin in the final. On 7 September 2014, he was again at midfield when Kilkenny drew 3–22 to 1–28 with Tipperary in the All-Ireland final. He retained his position on the starting fifteen for the replay on 27 September 2014 and ended the game with a third All-Ireland medal - his first on the field of play - following the 2–17 to 2–14 victory.

Fogarty won his third Leinster Championship medal on 5 July 2015 following Kilkenny's 1–25 to 2–15 defeat of Galway in the final. On 6 September 2015, he was again at midfield for the All-Ireland final against Galway. Fogarty ended the game with a fourth All-Ireland medal in five seasons following the 1–22 to 1–18 victory.

Fogarty won a fourth Leinster Championship medal on 3 July 2016 following a 1–26 to 0–22 defeat of Galway in the final. He was again at midfield for the All-Ireland final against Tipperary on 4 September 2016. Fogarty ended the game on the losing side following a 2–29 to 2–20 defeat.

On 8 April 2018, Fogarty was named amongst the substitutes when Kilkenny faced Tipperary in the National League final. He was introduced as a substitute for Richie Leahy and scored a goal in the 2–23 to 2–17 victory. Fogarty was back on the starting fifteen and lined out at midfield when Kilkenny drew 0-18 apiece with Galway in the Leinster final on 1 July 2018. He retained his position for the replay a week later; however, Kilkenny suffered a 1–28 to 3–15 defeat.

On 30 June 2019, Fogarty lined out at midfield when Kilkenny suffered a 1–23 to 0–23 defeat by Wexford in the Leinster final.

On 3 December 2024, Fogarty announced his retirement from inter-county hurling.

== Personal life ==
Fogarty's brother, Damien, is also an All-Ireland medal winner with Kilkenny, while his father, Martin, is an All-Ireland-winning selector with Kilkenny under the management of Brian Cody.

== Career statistics ==
As of match played 26 January 2020.

Team	Year	National League			Leinster		All-Ireland		Total	
Team	Year	Division	Apps	Score	Apps	Score	Apps	Score	Apps	Score
Kilkenny	2011	Division 1A	6	0-00	0	0-00	0	0-00	6	0-00
Kilkenny	2012	Division 1A	3	0-00	0	0-00	1	0-00	4	0-00
Kilkenny	2013	Division 1A	4	0-00	3	0-00	0	0-00	7	0-00
Kilkenny	2014	Division 1A	3	0-00	2	0-00	3	0-01	8	0-01
Kilkenny	2015	Division 1A	1	0-00	2	0-01	2	0-01	5	0-02
Kilkenny	2016	Division 1A	4	0-02	2	0-04	3	0-02	9	0-08
Kilkenny	2017	Division 1A	5	0-02	1	0-00	2	0-00	8	0-02
Kilkenny	2018	Division 1A	3	1-01	6	0-03	1	0-01	10	1-05
Kilkenny	2019	Division 1A	5	0-02	5	0-01	3	0-02	13	0-05
Kilkenny	2020	Division 1A	1	0-02	0	0-00	0	0-00	1	0-02
Total			35	1-09	21	0-09	15	0-07	71	1-25

== Honours ==
Castlecomer Community School

- Leinster Colleges Senior Hurling Championship (1): 2007

Erin's Own

- Kilkenny Intermediate Hurling Championship (1): 2008
- Kilkenny Minor Hurling Championship (1): 2008

Kilkenny

- All-Ireland Senior Hurling Championship (4): 2011, 2012, 2014, 2015
- Leinster Senior Hurling Championship (4): 2011, 2014, 2015, 2016
- National Hurling League (4): 2012, 2013, 2014, 2018
- Leinster Intermediate Hurling Championship (1): 2009
- Leinster Under-21 Hurling Championship (1): 2009
- All-Ireland Minor Hurling Championship (1): 2008
- Leinster Minor Hurling Championship (1): 2008
