= Tony Scroope =

Irish hurler

Personal information
- Native name: Antaine de Scrúp (Irish)
- Born: 1984 (age 41–42) Nenagh, County Tipperary, Ireland
- Occupation: Financial advisor

Sport
- Sport: Hurling
- Position: Full-forward
Club
- Years: Club
- Burgess
College
- Years: College
- 2002-2005: NUI Galway
College titles
- Fitzgibbon titles: 0
Inter-county*
Years	County	Apps (scores)
2004-2009	Tipperary	1 (0-00)
Inter-county titles
- Munster titles: 1
- All-Irelands: 0
- NHL: 0
- All Stars: 0
- *Inter County team apps and scores correct as of 15:11, 9 April 2022.

Tony Scroope (born 1984) is an Irish former hurler who played for Tipperary Championship club Burgess and at inter-county level with the Tipperary senior hurling team. He usually lined out in the full-forward line.

== Career ==
Scroope first came to hurling prominence as a schoolboy with Nenagh CBS in the Harty Cup before later lining out with NUI Galway in the Fitzgibbon Cup. He simultaneously progressed through the various grades at club level and was a member of the Burgess team that won the Tipperary IHC title in 2005. Scroope first appeared on the inter-county scene as a member of the Tipperary minor hurling team that lost the 2002 All-Ireland minor final to Kilkenny. He progressed onto the under-21 grade where he once again lost out to Kilkenny in the 2004 All-Ireland under-21 final. After one year with the intermediate team, Scroope was drafted onto the Tipperary senior hurling team in 2004. He remained on and off the team over the following five seasons and won a Munster Championship medal as a member of the extended panel in 2009.

== Honours ==
Burgess

- Tipperary Intermediate Hurling Championship: 2005

Tipperary

- Munster Senior Hurling Championship: 2009
- Munster Under-21 Hurling Championship: 2003, 2004
- Munster Minor Hurling Championship: 2002
