= 2004 All-Ireland Under-21 Hurling Championship =

All-Ireland Under-21 Hurling Championship 2004
Championship Details
- Dates: 2 June – 18 September 2004
- Teams: 15

All Ireland Champions
- Winners: Kilkenny (9th win)
- Captain: James Fitzpatrick
- Manager: Martin Fogarty

All Ireland Runners-up
- Runners-up: Tipperary
- Captain: Diarmaid FitzGerald
- Manager: Séamus Power

Provincial Champions
- Munster: Tipperary
- Leinster: Kilkenny
- Ulster: Down
- Connacht: Not Played

Championship Statistics
- Matches Played: 14
- Top Scorer: Tony Scroope (5-20)

The 2004 All-Ireland Under-21 Hurling Championship was the 41st staging of the All-Ireland Under-21 Hurling Championship, the Gaelic Athletic Association's premier inter-county hurling tournament for players under the age of twenty-one. The championship began on 2 June 2004 and ended on 18 September 2004.

Kilkenny were the defending champions.

The All-Ireland final was played on 18 September 2004 at Nowlan Park in Kilkenny, between Kilkenny and Tipperary, in what was their first meeting in a final in 9 years. Kilkenny won the match by 3-21 to 1-06 to claim their 9th championship title overall and a second title in succession.

Tipperary's Tony Scroope was the championship's top scorer with 5-20.

== Results ==
=== Leinster Under-21 Hurling Championship ===
Quarter-final

2 June 2004 Quarter-final	Laois	2-10 - 0-20	Kilkenny	O'Moore Park, Portlaoise
	JJ McHugh (1-10), J Hooban (1-0).		J Fitzpatrick (0-11), S O’Neill (0-4), E Reid (0-1), W Dwyer (0-1), PJ Delaney (0-1), E Larkin (0-1), B Dowling (0-1).

Semi-finals

24 June 2004 Semi-final	Wexford	1-13 - 2-7	Offaly	Nowlan Park, Kilkenny
	R Jacob 0-7 (2f, 1 '65'), J Lawlor 1-1, D Mythen 0-3, P White 0-1, M Kelly 0-1.	Report	B Carroll 0-3 (1f, 1'65'), B Bergin, E Egan 1-0 each, K Kelly, B Kearney, D Hayden, E Franks (f) 0-1 each.

29 June 2004 Semi-final	Kilkenny	0-15 - 2-5	Dublin	O'Moore Park, Portlaoise
	J Fitzpatrick 0-6, B Dowling 0-3, C Phelan 0-3, J Phelan 0-1; R Power 0-1, E Reid 0-1.		D O'Callaghan 1-3, S O'Connor 1-0, R Fallon 0-1; M Griffin 0-1.

Final

14 July 2004 Final	Wexford	2-3 - 1-16	Kilkenny	Wexford Park, Wexford
	R Jacob (1-1), J Breen (1-0), D Mythen (0-1), J Lawlor (0-1).		R Power (1-3), W O’Dwyer (0-3), J Fitzpatrick (0-3); S Hennessy (0-2), S O’Neill (0-1), P Cleere (0-1); C Hoyne (0-1); J Phelan (0-1), B Dowling (0-1).	Referee: J McGrath (Westmeath)

=== Munster Under-21 Hurling Championship ===
Quarter-finals

9 June 2004 Quarter-final	Kerry	1-10 - 2-10	Limerick	Austin Stack Park, Tralee
	M Conway 0-5, B Harris 0-3, S Goggin 0-1, J Egan 0-1.		N Moran 0-4, A O'Connor 1-0, A O'Shaughnessy 1-0, M O'Brien 0-2, P Russell 0-1; R Hayes 0-1; B Murray 0-1, P Kirby 0-1.

9 June 2004 Quarter-final	Cork	1-11 - 1-6	Clare	Gaelic Grounds, Limerick
	M Cousin 0-4, K Murphy 0-4, J Bowles 1-0; K Hartman 0-1, B Barry 0-1, M Naughton 0-1.		A Quinn 0-4, C Crowe 1-0, P Collins 0-1, T O½Donovan 0-1.

Semi-finals

6 July 2004 Semi-final	Cork	0-20 - 1-8	Waterford	Semple Stadium, Thurles
	K Murphy (Sars) 0-7 (7f), J Gardiner 0-3 (0-2f), M Cussen 0-3, F Murphy, B Barry, M Naughton, D O'Riordan 0-1.	Report	J Wall 1-3 (1-2f), L Lawlor 0-2, M Walsh, W Hutchinson, S O'Sullivan 0-1.	Referee: D O'Driscoll (Limerick)

7 July 2004 Semi-final	Limerick	1-7 - 5-11	Tipperary	Gaelic Grounds, Limerick
	N Moran 0-4 (0-1 frees), A O'Shaughnessy 1-1, M O'Brien 0-1, B Murray 0-1.	Report	T Scroope 3-3 (0-3 frees), F Devanney 1-1, E Sweeney 1-0, P Buckley 0-2, R Ruth 0-2, M Farrell, W Ryan, W Cully 0-1 each.	Referee: S McMahon (Clare)

Final

4 August 2004 Final	Tipperary	1-16 - 1-13	Cork	Semple Stadium, Thurles
	T Scroope (1-6), E Sweeney (0-4), S Sweeney (0-2); P Buckley (0-2), J Caesar (0-1), R Ruth (0-1).		K Murphy (1-2), M Naughton (0-3), K Murphy (0-2); B Barry (0-2), F Murphy (0-2); J Bowles (0-2).	Referee: D Richardson (Limerick)

=== Ulster Under-21 Hurling Championship ===
Semi-final

14 July 2004 Semi-final	Antrim	1-17 - 0-22	Down	Casement Park, Belfast
	K Stewart (1-5), M Herron (0-5), J Scullion (0-4); B Herron (0-1); B Delargy (0-1), P Cunningham (0-1).		B McGourty (0-11), E Clarke (0-4), P Smith (0-2), A Dynes (0-2), D McCusker (0-2), K Coulter (0-1).

Final

21 July 2004 Final	Down	5-8 - 4-7	Derry	McKenna Park, Ballycran
	E Clarke 3-2, P Smith 1-1, J Fowler 1-0, B McGourty 0-2, J McCusker 0-1, M Gilmore 0-1, A Dynes 0-1.		C Quinn 2-1, R Convery 1-1, K Farren 1-0, HP Kelly 0-2, L Hinphey 0-2, J Grant 0-1.	Referee: T McIntyre (Antrim)

=== All-Ireland Under-21 Hurling Championship ===
Semi-finals

28 August 2004 Semi-final	Tipperary	4-20 - 0-5	Down	O'Moore Park, Portlaoise
	T Scroope 1-9, S Sweeney 1-4, R Ruth 1-0, T Fitzgerald 1-0, D Fitzgerald 0-2, E Sweeney, J Caesar, S McGrath, H Maloney, P Buckley 0-1 each.	Report	M Gilmour 0-2, D McCusker 0-2, J McCusker 0-1.	Referee: E Morris (Dublin)

28 August 2004 Semi-final	Kilkenny	0-20 - 0-15	Galway	O'Moore Park, Portlaoise
	C Fitzpatrick 0-8, W O'Dwyer 0-4, S O'Neill 0-2, S Hennessey, E Reid, C Hoyne, R Power, C Phelan, J Phelan 0-1 each.	Report	G Farragher 0-6, J Gantley 0-2, N Healy 0-2, A Callanan, K Burke, D Collins, E Lynch, A Cullinane 0-1 each.	Referee: S McMahon (Clare)

Final

18 September 2004 Final	Kilkenny	3-21 - 1-6	Tipperary	Nowlan Park, Kilkenny
	R Power 0-7 (4f, 1 65), W O'Dwyer 1-3, J Fitzpatrick (1f), C Phelan 1-1 each, S O'Neill 0-3, B Dowling 0-2, S Hennessy, C Hoyne, M Wright, E Reid all 0-1 each.	Report	M Farrell 1-0, J Caesar 0-3, T Scroope 0-2 (2f), W Ryan 0-1.	Referee: B Kelly (Westmeath)

== Championship statistics ==
=== Top scorers ===
Top scorers overall

Rank	Player	County	Tally	Total	Matches	Average
1	Tony Scroope	Tipperary	5-20	35	4	8.75
2	James Fitzpatrick	Kilkenny	1-29	32	5	6.40
3	Kieran Murphy	Cork	1-13	16	3	5.33
4	Eoin Clarke	Down	3-06	15	3	5.00
4	Richie Power	Kilkenny	1-12	15	5	3.00
6	Willie O'Dwyer	Kilkenny	1-11	14	5	2.80
7	J. J. McHugh	Laois	1-10	13	1	13.00
7	Brendan McGourty	Down	0-13	13	2	6.50
9	Rory Jacob	Wexford	1-08	11	2	5.50
10	Seán O'Neill	Kilkenny	0-10	10	2	5.00

Top scorers in a single game

Rank	Player	Club	Tally	Total	Opposition
1	J. J. McHugh	Laois	1-10	13	Kilkenny
2	Tony Scroope	Tipperary	3-03	12	Limerick
2	Tony Scroope	Tipperary	1-09	12	Down
4	Eoin Clarke	Down	3-02	11	Derry
4	James Fitzpatrick	Kilkenny	0-11	11	Laois
4	Brendan McGourty	Down	0-11	11	Antrim
7	Tony Scroope	Tipperary	1-06	9	Cork
8	Karl Stewart	Antrim	1-05	8	Down
8	James Fitzpatrick	Kilkenny	0-08	8	Galway
10	Conor Quinn	Derry	2-01	7	Down
10	Rory Jacob	Wexford	0-07	7	Offaly
10	Kieran Murphy	Cork	0-07	7	Waterford
10	Richie Power	Kilkenny	0-07	7	Tipperary
