= Noel Crowley =

Noel Crowley may refer to:

- Noel Crowley (hurler, born 1962), Irish hurler for Roanmore and Waterford
- Noel Crowley (dual player) (born 1951), Irish hurler, Gaelic footballer and coach for Cork teams
