= Iarla =

Iarla is a masculine given name. Notable people with the name include:

- Iarla Ó Lionáird (born 1963 or 1964), Irish singer and record producer
- Iarla Tannian (born 1984), Irish hurler centre back
