= 2000 All-Ireland Senior Club Hurling Championship final =

2000 All-Ireland Senior Club Hurling Championship Final
- Event: 1999–00 All-Ireland Senior Club Hurling Championship
Athenry	St. Joseph's Doora-Barefield
0-16	0-12
- Date: 17 March 2000
- Venue: Croke Park, Dublin
- Man of the Match: Brian Higgins
- Referee: Michael Wadding (Waterford)
- Attendance: 31,965

The 2000 All-Ireland Senior Club Hurling Championship final was a hurling match played at Croke Park on 17 March 2000 to determine the winners of the 1999–00 All-Ireland Senior Club Hurling Championship, the 30th season of the All-Ireland Senior Club Hurling Championship, a tournament organised by the Gaelic Athletic Association for the champion clubs of the four provinces of Ireland. The final was contested by Athenry of Galway and St. Joseph's Doora-Barefield of Clare, with Athenry winning by 0-16 to 0-12.

The All-Ireland final was the second championship meeting between Athenry and St. Joseph's Doora-Barefield. It remains their last clash in the All-Ireland series. Both sides were hoping to win their second All-Ireland title.

St. Joseph's surged into an early four-point lead, however, there was little excitement in what was, up to then, a lack-lustre, mistake-ridden battle that was being decided by the free-taking prowess of Seánie McMahon and Eugene Cloonan. Athenry captain Joe Rabbitte scored their first point from play and kick-started their resurgence. With 10 minutes left to the break, they scored four unanswered points to draw level at 0-9 apiece. An off-the-ball incident involving Greg Baker and Kenneth Kennedy after 25 minutes also noticeably upped the ante and Ollie Baker was lucky to escape with a yellow card from referee Michael Wadding for a retaliatory swing which caught the linesman's attention.

Within 12 minutes of the second half, Athenry had taken a three-point lead. Cloonan finally beat Donal Cahill to score a point from play, while Donal Moran scored an excellent point after being set up by wing-back Brian Higgins. Andrew Whelan pulled the deficit back to two points for St. Joseph's after 44 minutes. The tide then visibly swung towards Athenry when Rabbitte flicked a ball to David Donoghue who shortened his grip before sending over a point from an almost impossible angle. With six minutes left, the Claremen still trailed by only two points. Athenry went three points clear again following a great score from Cloonan. Pat Higgins burst down the left wing, hand-passed off to Cloonan before he kicked over a point. With two minutes left, they got another break when Higgins won a contentious penalty when many thought he was fouled outside the area, if fouled at all. Cloonan opted for a point to put four between the sides. Jamesie O'Connor replied with a free within a minute, but Cloonan's next point, his ninth of the game, put the result beyond doubt.

Athenry's victory secured their second All-Ireland title. They joined a selection of teams in joint third position on the all-time roll of honour.

Due to the identical nature of the colour of their jerseys a change was necessary. Athenry wore a modified white strip of Connacht while St. Joseph's Doora-Barefield wore the blue of Munster.

== Match ==
=== Details ===
17 March 2000

Athenry	0-16 - 0-12	St. Joseph's Doora-Barefield
E Cloonan 0-9 (5f, 1 penalty), B Hanley 0-3 (1f), D Moran 0-2, J Rabbitte, D Donohue 0-1 each.		S McMahon 0-6 (4f,2 '65s), J O'Connor 0-3 (1f), D Hoey, O Baker and A Whelan 0-1 each.

Croke Park, Dublin
Attendance: 31,965
Referee: M Wadding (Waterford)

Athenry	St. Joseph's
