= 2004 All-Ireland Under-21 Hurling Championship final =

2004 All-Ireland Under-21 Hurling Championship Final
- Event: 2004 All-Ireland Under-21 Hurling Championship
Kilkenny	Tipperary
3-21	1-6
- Date: 18 September 2004
- Venue: Nowlan Park, Kilkenny
- Referee: Barry Kelly (Westmeath)

The 2004 All-Ireland Under-21 Hurling Championship final was a hurling match that was played at Nowlan Park, Kilkenny on 18 September 2004 to determine the winners of the 2004 All-Ireland Under-21 Hurling Championship, the 41st season of the All-Ireland Under-21 Hurling Championship, a tournament organised by the Gaelic Athletic Association for the champion teams of the four provinces of Ireland. The final was contested by Kilkenny of Leinster and Tipperary of Munster, with Kilkenny winning by 3–21 to 1–6.

== Match ==
=== Details ===
18 September 2004

Kilkenny	3-21 - 1-6	Tipperary
R Power (0-7, four frees, one 65), W O'Dwyer (1-3), C Phelan (1-1), J Fitzpatrick (1-1, point from free), S O'Neill (0-3), B Dowling (0-2), M Rice (0-1), C Hoyne (0-1), S Hennessy (0-1), E Reid (0-1),	Report	M Farrell (1-0), J Caesar (0-3), T Scroope (0-2, frees), W Ryan (0-1).

Nowlan Park, Kilkenny
Referee: B Kelly (Westmeath)
