= Pádraig Kelly =

Irish hurler

Pádraig Kelly is a former Irish sportsperson. He played hurling with the Galway senior inter-county team. He scored two points in the 1993 All-Ireland Senior Hurling Championship Final defeat against Kilkenny and won an All Star award in 1993, being picked in the left half back position.
