= Martin Fogarty =

Irish hurler and coach

Martin Fogarty is an Irish hurling coach and former player from County Kilkenny, whom the Gaelic Athletic Association (GAA) named as its first National Hurling Development manager in June 2016, a role he filled from the end of that August. The role, according to Fogarty, gave him "free rein to develop hurling across 32 counties as I think best" and particular intentions to develop the sport in Antrim, Carlow, Laois, Offaly and Westmeath. His workplace would be his home as well as Croke Park.

Fogarty played for the Erin's Own club and was also involved in coaching, management and officiating. He was in charge of the Kilkenny under-21 team that won the 2003 and 2004 All-Ireland Under-21 Hurling Championships. He served as a selector under Brian Cody's management between 2005 and 2013, a time when Kilkenny won six All-Ireland Senior Hurling Championships.

Fogarty is a teacher by profession. He spent 35 years as a school principal and 38 years in total in the teaching profession. He taught until he took over the role of National Hurling Development manager. Then he retired.

Married to Angela, he has two sons and a daughter. His sons Conor and Damien have played hurling at senior level for Kilkenny, something which Fogarty himself did not. He is teetotal.
