= Michael Walsh (Young Irelands hurler) =

Irish hurler

Sport
- Sport: Hurling
Club
- Years: Club
- Young Irelands
Inter-county*
Years	County	Apps (scores)
2015-present	Kilkenny	0 (0-00)
Inter-county titles
- Leinster titles: 1
- All-Irelands: 1
- NHL: 0
- All Stars: 0
- *Inter County team apps and scores correct as of 14:35, 10 August 2015.

Michael Walsh (fl. 2015) is an Irish hurler who currently plays at senior level for the Kilkenny county team and for his club Young Irelands.

Walsh was part of the Kilkenny panel that won the 2015 All-Ireland Senior Hurling Final on 6 September against Galway.
