= James McGrath (referee) =

Irish hurling referee

- Born: 1977 (age 48–49)
- Occupation: Hurling referee

James McGrath (born 1977) is an Irish former hurling referee. Born in Turin, County Westmeath, he has become one of the top referees over the last few years and has officiated at several big championship matches at all levels. He is a member of the Turin club.

In August 2018, McGrath announced his retirement from refereeing. His decision to retire was prompted by not being picked to referee the 2018 All-Ireland Hurling Final.

Now he is the Principal of Castlepollard Community College.

Achievements
Preceded by Barry Kelly; Brian Gavin	All-Ireland Senior Hurling Final referee 2012 (replay); 2013 (replay)	Succeeded by Brian Gavin; Barry Kelly
