= James Owens (referee) =

Irish hurling referee

- Full name: James Owens
- Born: 1977 (age 48–49); Kilrush / Askamore, County Wexford, Ireland

James Owens (born 1977) is an Irish hurling referee. Born in Kilrush / Askamore, County Wexford, he has refereed at several All-Ireland finals in minor, under-21 and club levels. He is a member of the Askamore club in Wexford.

Owens refereed the 2015 and 2018 All-Ireland finals and was again named to referee the 2019 final.

He appeared on Prime Time in 2022.

Achievements
Preceded by Brian Gavin (Offaly)	All-Ireland SHC Final referee 2015	Succeeded by Incumbent
