= Gerard Hartmann =

Irish physiotherapist and former athlete

Gerard Hartmann (born 1960 or 1961) is a physical therapist based in Limerick, Ireland. Previously competing as a triathlete, Hartmann was the Irish national triathlon champion on several occasions in the 1980s and early 1990s. As a physiotherapist, he has worked with a number of Olympic athletes. He was also reportedly "consulted by Nike" on the design of the Nike Free running shoe.

== Associated athletes ==
Athletes with whom Hartmann has reportedly worked include:

- Colin Jackson - Welsh former sprint and hurdling athlete
- Paula Radcliffe - former marathon world record holder
- Khalid Khannouchi - former marathon world record holder
- Sonia O'Sullivan - 5000m Athens Olympic silver medalist
- Henry Shefflin - Kilkenny hurler
- Keith Wood - rugby international
