= 2012 All-Ireland Senior Hurling Championship final =

2012 All-Ireland Senior Hurling Final
- Event: 2012 All-Ireland Senior Hurling Championship
Kilkenny	Galway
0–19 3–22	2–13 3–11
- Date: 9 September 2012 (first game); 30 September 2012 (replay)
- Venue: Croke Park, Dublin
- Man of the Match: Iarla Tannian (first game) Walter Walsh (second game)
- Referee: Barry Kelly (Westmeath) (first game); James McGrath (Westmeath) (replay)
- Attendance: 81,932 (first game) 82,274 (Second game)
- Weather: Sunny (first game); 20 °C (68 °F); Cloudy (replay); 16 °C (61 °F)

The 2012 All-Ireland Senior Hurling Championship Final, the deciding game of the 2012 All-Ireland Senior Hurling Championship, was played on 9 September 2012 at Croke Park, Dublin. The final was contested by first-time Leinster Champions Galway and Kilkenny, the defeated Leinster finalists and defending All-Ireland champions.

This was Galway's first appearance at this stage since 2005, when they lost to Cork. The match ended level, the first All-Ireland Senior Hurling Championship Final at the end of which the teams finished level since 1959. Kilkenny won the replay, with Henry Shefflin becoming the first Gaelic athlete to win nine All-Ireland Senior Championship medals on the field of play.

== First Final ==
=== Background ===
The first final was played on 9 September 2012. Kilkenny were the defending champions after defeating Tipperary by four points, 2–17 to 1–16, in the 2011 All-Ireland Senior Hurling Championship Final. However, Galway unexpectedly beat Kilkenny in the Leinster Senior Hurling Championship Final on 8 July 2012, the shock of the year. Kilkenny recovered and qualified for the 2012 All-Ireland Senior Hurling Championship Final via the back door, inflicting upon Tipperary their heaviest defeat in the All-Ireland Senior Hurling Championship since 1897 along the way. The final was a rematch of the 2012 Leinster Senior Hurling Championship Final against Galway. This was the fifth All-Ireland final clash between the two counties and the first since 1993 with Kilkenny winning three of the previous four. Galway's only win against Kilkenny came in 1987 when they won by six points.

It was confirmed on 24 August that Galway would be allocated just 12,000 tickets for the final with 25,000 to 30,000 Galway fans expected to attend the final. Tickets for the final were priced at €80 for stand tickets €40 for terrace tickets.

On 20 August 2012, the GAA announced that Barry Kelly from Westmeath would referee the 2012 All-Ireland Senior Hurling Championship Final. It was the third All-Ireland Senior Hurling Championship Final of his refereeing career—he previously refereed in 2006 and 2008.

Team GB's Olympic boxer Natasha Jonas was invited to attend the 2012 All-Ireland Senior Hurling Championship Final.

=== Match summary ===
This was the first All-Ireland Senior Hurling Championship Final at the end of which the teams finished level since 1959. Joe Canning scored a goal for Galway in the 10th minute, getting past three Kilkenny defenders and smashing an angled shot past Kilkenny goalkeeper David Herity. Kilkenny had managed just two points from the opening 18 minutes with Galway leading by 1–9 to 0–7 at half time. The sides were level in the 50th minute before Niall Burke got the second goal for Galway in the 55th minute after picking up a loose ball and shooting low into the net. Kilkenny were awarded a penalty for a foul on Eoin Larkin in the 69th minute with the sides level. Henry Shefflin decided to hit the ball over the bar and take the point. Joe Canning then hit a 73rd-minute equaliser from the 45-metre line close to the Hogan Stand side of the field to make the scores level and take the game to a replay three weeks later.

== Drawn Match Details ==
9 September 2012
15:30 IST

Galway	2–13 – 0–19	Kilkenny
J Canning 1–09 (0-08f), N Burke 1-02, A Smith, N Donoghue 0-01 each.	Report	H Shefflin 0–12 (10f, 1 pen), E Larkin, TJ Reid 0-02 each, A Fogarty, R Power, R Hogan.

Croke Park, Dublin
Attendance: 81,932
Referee: B. Kelly (Westmeath)

Galway	Kilkenny

== Replay ==
=== Tickets ===
Tickets for the replay were reduced in price to €50 for stand tickets and €25 for terrace tickets.

=== Team news ===
Galway named an unchanged side for the replay, held at Croke Park on 30 September 2012. Kilkenny made two changes. However, Galway goalkeeper James Skehill dislocated his shoulder in the team's final training session, casting some doubt upon his place in the team. He still played though.

=== Match summary ===
==== First half ====
Galway opened the scoring with a point from a 65-metre free after six minutes. Kilkenny soon moved in front with points from Henry Shefflin and debutant Walter Walsh. Galway's David Burke scored the first goal of the game after sixteen minutes, adding a second goal one minute later. Richie Power quickly scored Kilkenny's first goal and the game's third in as many minutes. Soon Kilkenny began to dominate and Galway could not register a score. The half-time score was Galway 2-04, Kilkenny 1–11.

==== Second half ====
Kilkenny's Richie Hogan opened the second half scoring with a point. Following some pushing and shoving, David Burke gets the ball into the back of the Kilkenny net for a third time but the referee blew his whistle and awarded a free to Galway instead, which Joe Canning scored. In the 49th minute, Galway's Cyril Donnellan was shown the red card and sent off after swinging his hurley at opponent J. J. Delaney and hitting him upon the head. In the 58th minute, debutant Walter Walsh scored Kilkenny's second goal and the game's fourth, with substitute C. Fennelly adding Kilkenny's third goal in the 62nd minute. In the 66th minute, Galway's J. Glynn scored his team's third goal and the game's sixth, lashing the sliotar into the roof of the net. But it was all too little, too late. The full-time score was Kilkenny 3–22, Galway 3–11.

== Replay Match Details ==
30 September 2012
15:30 IST

Galway	3–11 – 3–22	Kilkenny
J Canning 0–09 (5f, 1 '65, 1 sideline), D Burke 2-00, J Glynn 1-00, A Smith, T Og Regan 0-01 each.	Report	H Shefflin 0-09 (5f, 2 '65), W Walsh 1-03, R Power 1-02, C Fennelly 1-00, R Hogan 0-03, E Larkin, TJ Reid, C Buckley, M Fennelly, K Joyce (f) 0-01 each.

Croke Park, Dublin
Attendance: 82,274

Galway	Kilkenny

== Trophy presentation ==
The trophy was presented from the Hogan stand to Kilkenny captain Eoin Larkin by GAA president Liam O'Neill. After the presentation the Kilkenny team and management went on a lap of honour around the Croke Park pitch. Kilkenny captain Eoin Larkin sang his own version of "Cody's Winning Matches"—referring to manager Brian Cody—, prompting dismay from supporters of the Donegal senior football team.

== Homecoming ==
Thousands of people lined the streets of Kilkenny to welcome the team home.

Fine Gael Environment Minister Phil Hogan attended the team homecoming at Nowlan Park, which is located in his own constituency. Spectators roundly booed him as he stood upon the stage with Brian Cody, Henry Shefflin and the team.
