= Damien Fogarty =

Irish hurler

Personal information
- Native name: Damien Ó Fógartaigh (Irish)
- Born: 19 October 1985 (age 41) Castlecomer, County Kilkenny, Ireland

Sport
- Sport: Hurling
- Position: Goalkeeper
Club
- Years: Club
- 2003-present: Erin's Own
Club titles
- Kilkenny titles: 0
Inter-county*
Years	County	Apps (scores)
2008-2010	Kilkenny	0 (0-00)
Inter-county titles
- Leinster titles: 0
- All-Irelands: 0
- NHL: 0
- All Stars: 0
- *Inter County team apps and scores correct as of 18:20, 25 February 2012.

Damien Fogarty (born 19 October 1985) is an Irish hurler who currently plays as a substitute forward for the Kilkenny senior team.

Fogarty made his competitive debut for the team during the 2008 National League, however, since then he has remained on the fringes of the team. He has yet to make his championship debut, however, he has won one All-Ireland winners' medal and two Leinster winners' medals as a non-playing substitute.

At club level, Fogarty plays hurling with Erin's Own.

He is the son of Martin and brother of Conor.
