= Michael Wadding (referee) =

Irish hurling referee from Waterford

Michael Wadding is an Irish hurling referee from Waterford.

Wadding was the referee for the 2010 All-Ireland Senior Hurling Championship Final between Tipperary and Kilkenny. Wadding was also the referee for the 1997 All-Ireland Minor final and the 2003 All-Ireland Under 21 final.
