= Barry Kelly (referee) =

Irish hurling referee (born 1970)

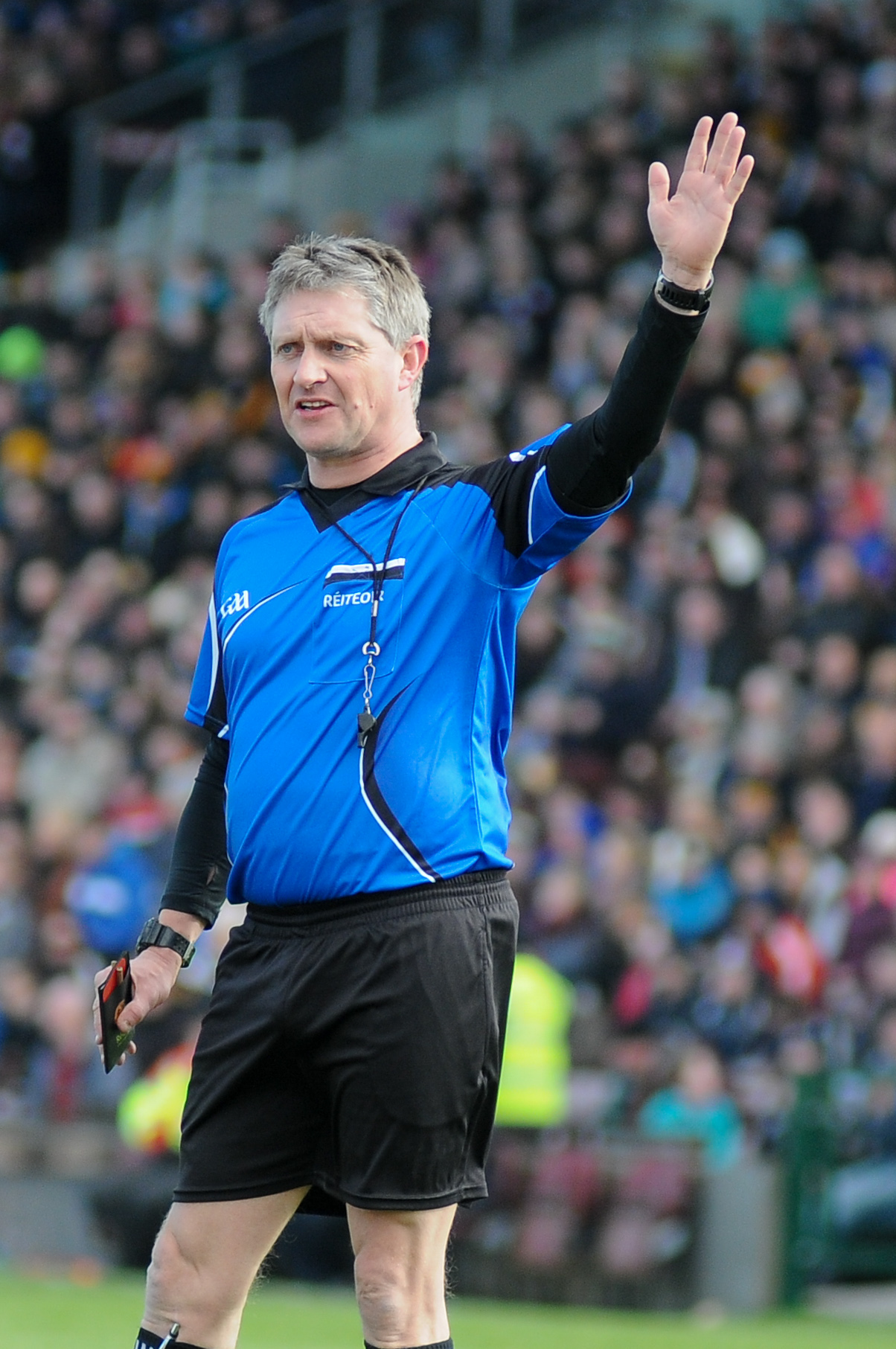
- Barry Kelly refereeing Galway v Kilkenny in the 2015 National Hurling League
- Full name: Barry Kelly
- Born: 1970 (age 55–56); Mullingar, County Westmeath, Ireland
- Other occupation: Secondary school teacher

Barry Kelly (born 1970) is an Irish hurling referee. Born in Mullingar, County Westmeath, he went on to become one of the top referees in his sport and has officiated at several All-Ireland finals in minor, under-21 and senior levels. He is a member of the St Oliver Plunkett's club in Mullingar. He is an English, History and CSPE teacher at St Finian's College in Mullingar.

Kelly has refereed four All-Ireland Senior Hurling Championship Finals - 2006, 2008, 2012, and 2014. He has twin sons, Manus and Theo. His wife Catherine died after a brief illness at St. James's Hospital in 2013.

Achievements
Preceded by Pat Aherne (Carlow)	All-Ireland Minor Hurling Final referee 2000	Succeeded by Tommy McIntyre (Antrim)
Preceded by Michael Wadding (Waterford)	All-Ireland Under-21 Hurling Final referee 2004	Succeeded by John Sexton (Cork)
Preceded by Séamus Roche (Tipperary)	All-Ireland Senior Hurling Final referee 2006	Succeeded by Diarmuid Kirwan (Cork)
Preceded by Diarmuid Kirwan (Cork)	All-Ireland Senior Hurling Final referee 2008	Succeeded by Diarmuid Kirwan (Cork)
Preceded by Brian Gavin (Offaly)	All-Ireland Senior Hurling Final referee 2012 (draw)	Succeeded by James McGrath (Westmeath)
Preceded by James McGrath (Westmeath)	All-Ireland Senior Hurling Final referee 2014 (draw)	Succeeded by Brian Gavin (Offaly)
