= 1993 All-Ireland Senior Hurling Championship final =

1993 All-Ireland Senior Hurling Final
- Event: 1993 All-Ireland Senior Hurling Championship
Kilkenny	Galway
2-17	1-15
- Date: 5 September 1993
- Venue: Croke Park, Dublin
- Man of the Match: Pádraig Kelly
- Referee: Terence Murray (Limerick)
- Attendance: 63,460
- Weather: Dry

The 1993 All-Ireland Senior Hurling Championship Final was the 106th All-Ireland Final and the culmination of the 1993 All-Ireland Senior Hurling Championship, an inter-county hurling tournament for the top teams in Ireland. The match was held at Croke Park, Dublin, on 5 September 1993, between Kilkenny and Galway. Galway lost to Kilkenny on a score line of 2–17 to 1–15. P. J. Delaney scored a goal for Kilkenny with a one handed shot low to the net at the hill 16 end.

5 September
Final
15:30 UTC+1

Kilkenny	2-17 – 1-15	Galway
P. J. Delaney (1-4), A. Ronan (1-2), D. J. Carey (0-4), L. McCarthy (0-3), E. Morrissey (0-2), J. Power (0-1), B. Hennessy (0-1).		J. Cooney (0-4), J. Rabbitte (0-4), L. Burke (1-0), P. Malone (0-3), P. Kelly (0-2), M. McGrath (0-2).

Croke Park, Dublin
Attendance: 63,460
Referee: T. Murray (Limerick)

Kilkenny	Galway
