= Jackie Tyrrell =

Irish hurler (born 1982)

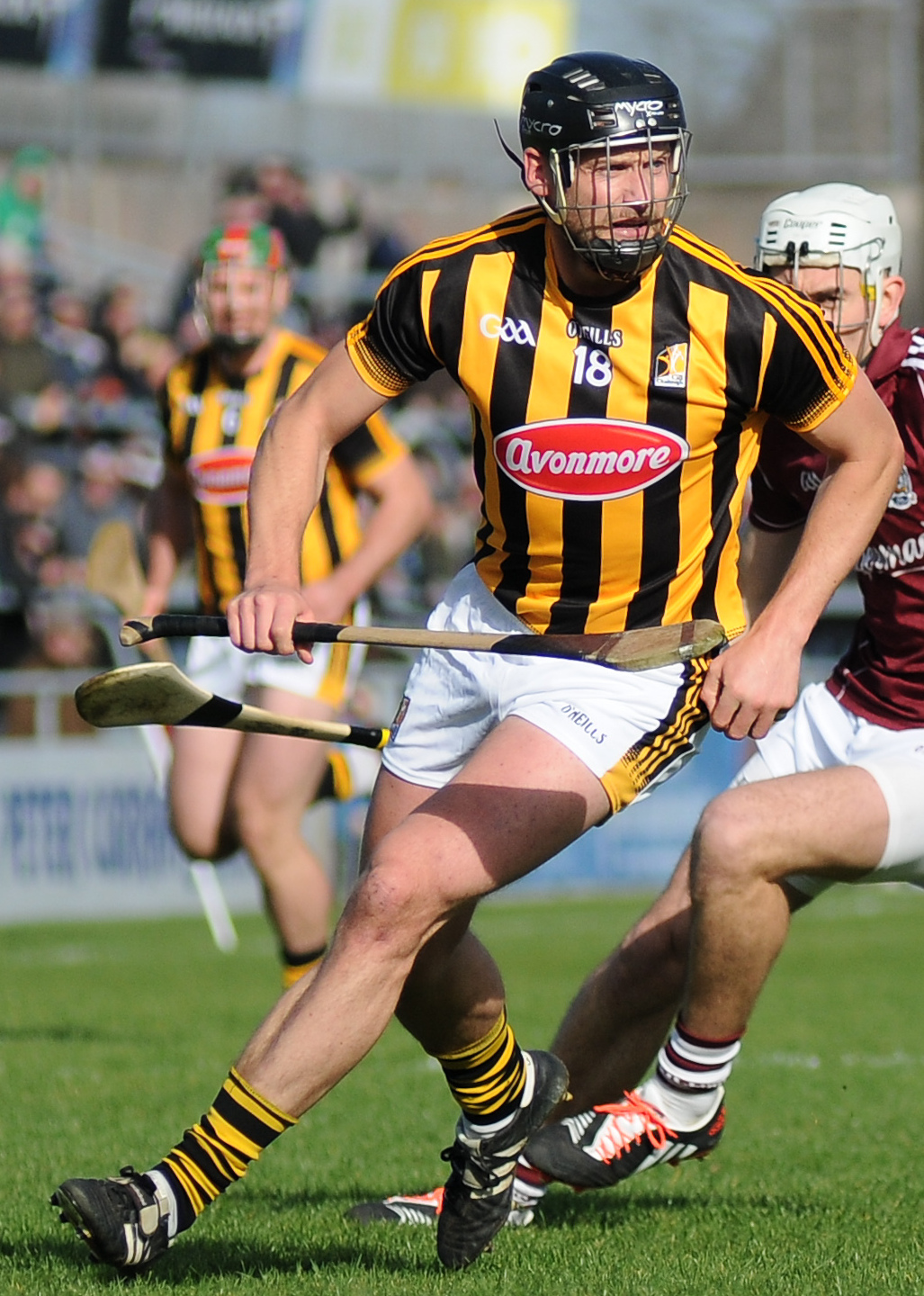
- Tyrrell with Kilkenny in the 2015 National Hurling League at Pearse Stadium

Personal information
- Native name: Seánie Ó Tirial (Irish)
- Born: 19 June 1982 (age 44) Kilkenny, Ireland
- Occupation: Sales development manager
- Height: 6 ft 2 in (188 cm)

Sport
- Sport: Hurling
- Position: Left corner-back
Club
- Years: Club
- 1999–present: James Stephens
Club titles
	Football	Hurling
Kilkenny titles	2	3
Leinster titles	0	2
All-Ireland titles	0	1
College
- Years: College
- Limerick Institute of Technology
College titles
- Fitzgibbon titles: 2
Inter-county*
Years	County	Apps (scores)
2003–2016	Kilkenny	48 (0–2)
Inter-county titles
- Leinster titles: 11
- All-Irelands: 9
- NHL: 6
- All Stars: 4
- *Inter County team apps and scores correct as of 12:47, 6 July 2015.

Jackie Tyrrell (born 19 June 1982) is an Irish hurler whose league and championship career with the Kilkenny senior team spanned fourteen seasons from 2003 to 2016.

Born in Kilkenny, Tyrrell was raised in a hurling household. His father, Dermot Tyrrell, had played for the O'Loughlin Gaels club and was an All-Ireland-winner in the minor grade in 1973 before later playing for the county at under-21 level.

Tyrrell played competitive hurling during his schooling at St. Kieran's College. Here he won back-to-back Leinster medals, before claiming an All-Ireland medal in 2000. Tyrrell first appeared for the James Stephens club at juvenile and underage levels, before progressing onto the club's senior team in 1999. An All-Ireland medal winners in 2005, he also won two Leinster medals and is a dual championship medal winner.

Tyrrell made his debut on the inter-county scene at the age of seventeen when he was picked on the Kilkenny minor panel. He won a Leinster medal in his first season, however, an All-Ireland medal eluded him. By 2003 he had progressed onto the Kilkenny under-21 side and collected an All-Ireland medal as captain of the team. That same year Tyrrell was added to the senior panel for Kilkenny's championship campaign. Over the course of the next fourteen seasons, he won nine All-Ireland medals, beginning with a lone triumph as a non-playing substitute in 2003, a record-equalling four championships in-a-row from 2006 to 2009 and four championships in five seasons between 2011 and 2015. The All-Ireland-winning captain of 2006, Tyrrell was denied a record-equalling tenth winners' medal in 2016 in what was his last All-Ireland final appearance. He also won eleven Leinster medals and six National Hurling League medals. Tyrrell played his last game for Kilkenny in April 2016. He announced his retirement from inter-county hurling on 11 November 2016.

As a member of the Leinster inter-provincial team, Tyrrell has won three Railway Cup medals. Throughout his inter-county career he has made 48 championship appearances.

== Playing career ==
=== Colleges ===
During his schooling at St. Kieran's College, Tyrrell established himself as a key member of the senior hurling team. In 1999 he won his first Leinster medal following a 3–13 to 1–11 defeat of Dublin Colleges.

Tyrrell added a second Leinster medal to his collection in 2000, as Dublin Colleges were defeated by 2–13 to 1–10. St. Flannan's College provided the opposition in the subsequent All-Ireland decider. Having come close to beating the Ennis-based school at the same stage the previous year, St. Kieran's made no mistake this time and recorded a 1–10 to 0–9 victory, giving Tyrrell an All-Ireland medal.

=== University ===
During his studies at the Cork Institute of Technology and the Limerick Institute of Technology, Tyrrell was an automatic inclusion on the college hurling team. In 2005 he was on the LIT team that faced nearby rivals University of Limerick in the final of the Fitzgibbon Cup. LIT failed to bend under the weight of history and recorded a comprehensive 2–13 to 3–4 victory to claim the title for the very first time.

After surrendering their title to the Waterford Institute of Technology the following year, LIT were back in the decider again in 2007. Joe Canning top scored with 1–8, and Tyrrell collected a second Fitzgibbon Cup medal following a 2–15 to 0–13 defeat of the National University of Ireland, Galway.

=== Club ===
Tyrrell plays his club hurling and football with the famous James Stephens club. He has had much success at under-age levels, including championship medals at under-14, under-16, under-21 and junior.

In 2003 Tyrrell won a county football championship medal following a 2–7 to 0–6 defeat of O'Loughlin Gaels.

Tyrrell added a county hurling championship medal to his collection in 2004 following a 2–16 to 3–12 defeat of Young Ireland's. He later collected a Leinster title, although the one-point defeat of University College Dublin was in controversial circumstances. The James Stephens club subsequently qualified for the All-Ireland final with Athenry providing the opposition. A victory for "the village" gave Tyrrell an All-Ireland club medal.

James Stephens retained the county championship in 2005, with Tyrrell winning a second hurling medal following a 1–18 to 2–12 defeat of Ballyhale Shamrocks. He later picked up a second Leinster club medal following a second consecutive triumph over UCD. James Stephens were subsequently trounced by eventual winners Portumna in the All-Ireland semi-final.

In 2008 Tyrrell won a second county football championship medal following a 1–09 to 1–08 defeat of Erin's Own.

After a six-year gap Tyrrell won a third hurling championship in 2011 after a thrilling draw and replay with Ballyhale Shamrocks.

=== Minor and under-21 ===
Tyrrell first played for Kilkenny in 1999 when he joined the minor side. He won his sole Leinster medal that year following a 2–13 to 1–11 defeat of Wexford.

By 2003 Tyrrell was a key member and captain of the Kilkenny under-21 team. He won a Leinster medal that year following a 0–12 to 1–4 defeat of Dublin. Kilkenny later faced Galway in the All-Ireland decider. "The Cats" outsmarted a Galway side which struggled in attack and conceded a goal a minute into the second half. The 2–13 to 0–12 score line gave Tyrrell an All-Ireland Under-21 Hurling Championship medal while he also had the honour of collecting the cup as captain.

=== Senior ===
==== Beginnings ====
Tyrrell was still a member of the under-21 team when he was added to the Kilkenny senior panel in 2003. That year he shared in his county's Leinster and All-Ireland triumphs, however, Tyrrell was yet to make his debut.

On 22 February 2004, Tyrrell made his senior debut in a 1–10 to 0–15 defeat by Waterford in the opening round of the league. He was a regular starter during that league campaign, however, he played no part in the subsequent championship.

Kilkenny were back in form in 2005, with Tyrrell winning a first National League medal following a huge 3–20 to 0–15 victory over Clare. On 12 June 2005 Tyrrell made his championship debut in a 6–28 to 0–15 Leinster semi-final trouncing of Offaly. "The Cats" later struggled against a wasteful Wexford side, however, a 0–22 to 1–16 victory gave Tyrrell a first Leinster medal on the field of play. While a third successive All-Ireland showdown with Cork seemed likely, Galway defeated Kilkenny in the All-Ireland semi-final in one of the games of the decade.

==== Four-in-a-row ====
In 2006 Tyrrell, who was captain of the side for the year, added a second National League medal to his collection following a 3–11 to 0–14 victory over Limerick. He later won his second Leinster medal following another facile 1–23 to 1–12 victory over Wexford. On 3 September 2006 Kilkenny faced a Cork team who were presented with the opportunity to become the first side in nearly thirty years to secure three successive All-Ireland championships. Like previous encounters neither side took a considerable lead, however, Kilkenny had a vital goal from Aidan Fogarty. Cork were in arrears coming into the final few minutes, however, Ben O'Connor scored a late goal for Cork. It was too little too late as the Cats denied Cork on a score line of 1–16 to 1–13. Not only was it a first All-Ireland medal for Tyrrell, but he also had the honour of lifting the Liam MacCarthy Cup.

Tyrrell collected a third Leinster medal in 2007, as Kilkenny asserted their provincial dominance and defeated Wexford by 2–24 to 1–12. On 2 September 2007 Kilkenny faced defeated Munster finalists and surprise All-Ireland semi-final winners Limerick in the championship decider. Kilkenny got off to a flying start with Eddie Brennan and Henry Shefflin scoring two goals within the first ten minutes to set the tone. Limerick launched a second-half comeback, however, "the Cats" were too powerful and cruised to a 2–19 to 1–15 victory. It was Tyrrell's second All-Ireland medal. He was later presented with his first All-Star award.

Kilkenny secured the Leinster crown again in 2008, with Tyrrell collecting a fourth winners' medal following a 5–21 to 0–17 drubbing of Wexford. On 8 September 2008 Kilkenny faced Waterford in the All-Ireland decider for the first time in forty-five years. In a disappointingly one-sided final, Kilkenny produced a near perfect seventy minutes as Waterford endured a nightmare afternoon. A 23-point winning margin, 3–24 from play, only two wides in the entire match and eight scorers in all with Eddie Brennan and Henry Shefflin leading the way in a 3–30 to 1–13 victory. It was Tyrrell's third All-Ireland medal, while a second All-Star quickly followed.

Tyrrell collected a third National League medal in 2009, as Kilkenny beat Tipperary by 2–26 to 4–17 with a thrilling extra-time victory. He later won a fifth successive Leinster medal as new challengers Dublin were bested by 2–18 to 0–18. On 6 September Kilkenny were poised to become the second team ever in the history of hurling to win four successive All-Ireland championships when they faced Tipperary in the decider. For long periods Tipp looked the likely winners, however, late goals from Henry Shefflin and substitute Martin Comerford finally killed off their efforts to secure a 2–22 to 0–23 victory. Tyrrell had collected his fourth All-Ireland medal, while a third successive All-Star soon followed.

==== Continued dominance ====
In 2010 Kilkenny defeated Galway in an eagerly-anticipated but ultimately disappointing provincial decider. A 1–19 to 1–12 victory gave Tyrrell a sixth Leinster medal. The drive for an unprecedented fifth successive All-Ireland crown reached a head on 5 September 2010, when Kilkenny faced Tipperary in the All-Ireland decider. "The Cats" lost talisman Henry Shefflin due to injury, while Tipperary's Lar Corbett ran riot and scored a hat-trick of goals as Delaney's side fell to a 4–17 to 1–18 defeat. In spite of this defeat, Tyrrell later won a fourth consecutive All-Star award.

Kilkenny's stranglehold in Leinster continued in 2011. A 4–17 to 1–15 defeat of Dublin gave "the Cats" a record-equalling seventh successive championship. Kilkenny subsequently faced Tipperary in the All-Ireland decider on 4 September 2011. Goals by Michael Fennelly and Richie Hogan in either half gave Kilkenny, who many viewed as the underdogs going into the game, a 2–17 to 1–16 victory. Tyrrell collected a fifth All-Ireland medal.

2012 began well for Tyrrell when he collected a fourth National League medal following a 3–21 to 0–16 demolition of old rivals Cork. Kilkenny were later shocked by Galway in the Leinster decider, losing by 2–21 to 2–11, however, both sides subsequently met in the All-Ireland decider on 9 September 2012. Kilkenny had led going into the final stretch, however, Joe Canning struck a stoppage time equaliser to level the game at 2–13 to 0–19 and send the final to a replay for the first time since 1959. The replay took place three weeks later on 30 September 2012. Galway stunned the reigning champions with two first-half goals, however, Kilkenny's championship debutant Walter Walsh gave a man of the match performance, claiming a 1–3 haul. The 3–22 to 3–11 Kilkenny victory gave Tyrrell a sixth All-Ireland medal.

2013 saw Tyrrell winning a fifth National League medal following a 2–17 to 0–20 defeat of Tipperary in the decider. However, Kilkenny were knocked out of the Leinster Championship at the semi-final stage by eventual winners Dublin, while Clare were surprise All-Ireland winners.

In 2014 Tyrrell collected his sixth league medal, as Kilkenny secured a narrow one-point 2–25 to 1–27 extra-time victory over Tipperary. Tyrrell subsequently secured an eighth Leinster medal, as a dominant Kilkenny display gave "the Cats" a 0–14 to 1–9 defeat of Dublin. On 7 September 2014, Kilkenny faced Tipperary in the All-Ireland decider. In what some consider to be the greatest game of all time, the sides were level when Tipperary were awarded a controversial free. John O'Dwyer had the chance to win the game, however, his late free drifted wide resulting in a draw. The replay on 27 September 2014 was also a close affair. Goals from brothers Richie and John Power inspired Kilkenny to a 2–17 to 2–14 victory. It was Tyrrell's seventh All-Ireland medal.

Tyrrell won a ninth Leinster medal in 2015 following a 1–25 to 2–15 defeat of Galway in the decider. It was Kilkenny's 70th provincial title. He later twisted his ankle badly during a training session, an injury which ruled him out of the rest of the championship. In spite of this he was listed as a substitute when Kilkenny faced Galway in the All-Ireland decider on 6 September 2015. The team struggled in the first half, however, a T. J. Reid goal and a dominant second half display, which limited Galway to just 1–4, saw Kilkenny power to a 1–22 to 1–18 victory. Tyrrell played no part in that game, however, he was widely praised by his teammates for delivering an inspirational half-time speech. The victory gave Tyrrell his second All-Ireland medal as a non-playing substitute and his ninth winners' medal overall.

On 11 November 2016, Tyrell announced his retirement from inter-county hurling. "After careful consideration and reflection I have decided that now is the right time for me to announce my retirement from inter county hurling with the Kilkenny senior hurling team, I am making this decision comfortable in the knowledge that I never settled for anything less than giving it my very best. I fought to the end and I never gave up until the contest was over." Tyrrell said in a statement.

=== Inter-provincial ===
In 2006 Tyrrell was a non-playing substitute on the Leinster team that defeated Connacht by 1–23 to 0–17 in the final of the Railway Cup.

After surrendering their title the following year, Leinster were back in the decider once again in 2008. Richie Power top-scored with nine points as Leinster secured a 1–15 to 1–12 victory. It was Tyrrell's first Railway Cup medal on the field of play.

Leinster made it two-in-a-row in 2009, with Tyrrell collecting his third winner's medal as Leinster defeated Connacht by 3–18 to 1–17.

After a two-year hiatus and a period of uncertainty surrounding the competition, the Railway Cup returned in 2012 with a Tyrrell-captained Leinster facing Connacht in the decider. The game was effectively over at half time, with Leinster powering to an eventual 2–19 to 1–15 victory.

== Media career ==
Tyrrell has been an analyst on League Sunday.

== Personal life ==
Born in Kilkenny, Tyrrell was educated at the St. Patrick's De La Salle national school and later attended St. Kieran's College. After completing his Leaving Cert he studied at the Cork Institute of Technology before later completing a degree in quantity surveying at the Limerick Institute of Technology. He currently works as a sales development manager for Glanbia.

== Miscellaneous ==
- If Kilkenny had won the 2016 All-Ireland Championship final Jackie Tyrell would have equalled Henry Shefflins record of having won 10 All-Ireland medals. As of September 2018 he remains the only hurling player to have almost equalled this record breaking achievement as a playing panellist.

== Career statistics ==
Team	Year	Division	Walsh Cup		National League		Leinster		All-Ireland		Total	
Team	Year	Division	Apps	Score	Apps	Score	Apps	Score	Apps	Score	Apps	Score
Kilkenny	2009	Division 1	3	0-00	8	0-00	2	0-00	2	0-01	15	0-01
Kilkenny	2010	Division 1	0	0-00	7	0-01	2	0-00	2	0-00	11	0-01
Kilkenny	2011	Division 1	2	0-00	6	0-00	2	0-00	2	0-00	12	0-00
Kilkenny	2012	Division 1A	1	0-00	5	0-00	2	0-00	4	0-00	12	0-00
Kilkenny	2013	Division 1A	0	0-00	5	0-00	2	0-00	3	0-00	10	0-00
Kilkenny	2014	Division 1A	1	0-00	5	0-01	4	0-00	3	0-04	13	0-05
Kilkenny	2015	Division 1A	0	0-00	5	0-00	2	0-00	0	0-00	7	0-00
Kilkenny	2016	Division 1A	0	0-00	4	0-00	0	0-00	0	0-00	4	0-00
Total			7	0-00	45	0-02	16	0-00	16	0-05	84	0-07

== Honours ==
=== Team ===
St. Kieran's College

- All-Ireland Colleges' Senior Hurling Championship (1): 2000
- Leinster Colleges' Senior Hurling Championship (2): 1999, 2000

Limerick Institute of Technology

- Fitzgibbon Cup (2): 2005, 2007

James Stephens

- All-Ireland Senior Club Hurling Championship (1): 2005
- Leinster Senior Club Hurling Championship (2): 2004, 2005
- Kilkenny Senior Club Hurling Championship (3): 2004, 2005, 2011
- Kilkenny Senior Club Football Championship (2): 2003, 2008
- Kilkenny Junior Club Hurling Championship (1): 2000
- Kilkenny Under-21 Club Hurling Championship (2): 2000, 2002
- Kilkenny Junior 'B' Club Hurling Championship (1): 2026

Kilkenny

- All-Ireland Senior Hurling Championship (9): 2003 (sub), 2006 (c), 2007, 2008, 2009, 2011, 2012, 2014, 2015 (sub)
- Leinster Senior Hurling Championship (11): 2003 (sub), 2005, 2006 (c), 2007, 2008, 2009, 2010, 2011, 2014, 2015, 2016 (sub)
- National Hurling League (6): 2005, 2006, 2009, 2012, 2013, 2014
- All-Ireland Under-21 Hurling Championship (1): 2003 (c)
- Leinster Under-21 Hurling Championship (1): 2003 (c)
- Leinster Minor Hurling Championship (1): 1999

Leinster

- Interprovincial Championship (4): 2006 (sub), 2008, 2009, 2012 (c)

=== Individual ===
Honours

- All-Stars (4): 2007, 2008, 2009, 2010
- GPA Team of the Year (4): 2007, 2008, 2009, 2010

Sporting positions
Preceded by Peter Barry	Kilkenny Senior Hurling Captain; 2006	Succeeded by Henry Shefflin
Achievements
Preceded by Peter Lawlor (Limerick)	All-Ireland Under-21 Hurling Final winning captain 2003	Succeeded by James 'Cha' Fitzpatrick (Kilkenny)
Preceded by Seán Óg Ó hAilpín (Cork)	All-Ireland Senior Hurling Final winning captain 2006	Succeeded by Henry Shefflin
Preceded by J. J. Delaney (Leinster)	Interprovincial Hurling Championship winning captain 2012	Succeeded by Brendan Maher (Munster)
