= Noel Crowley (hurler, born 1962) =

Waterford hurler (born 1962)

Personal information
- Nickname: Noelie
- Born: 23 December 1962 (age 63) Waterford City, waterford

Sport
- Sport: Hurling
- Position: Forward
Club
- Years: Club
- 1970s–1990s: Roanmore
Inter-county
- Years: County
- 1980s–1990s: Waterford
Inter-county titles
- Munster titles: 0
- All-Irelands: 0
- NHL: 0

Noel 'Noelie' Crowley (born 1962 in Waterford City) is an Irish former hurler who played for his local club Roanmore and at senior level for the Waterford county team.

Crowley is still involved in Roanmore GAA and officiates as a GAA umpire for Waterford referee Michael Wadding.
