= Iarla Tannian =

Galway hurler

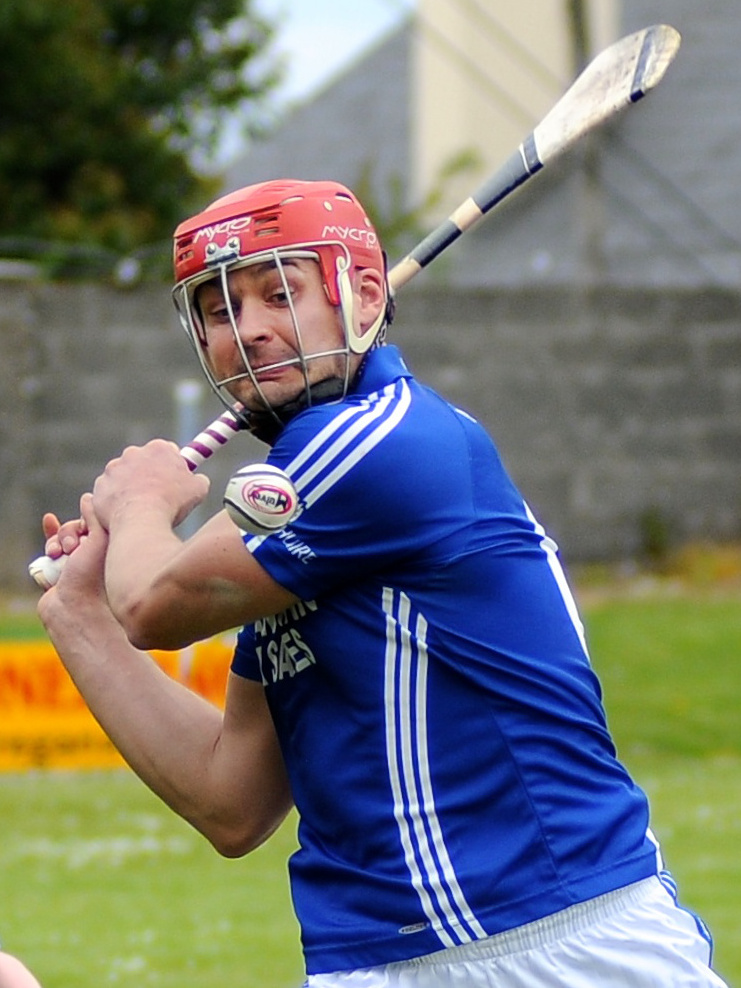
- Iarla Tannian in action for Ardrahan in 2013

Personal information
- Native name: Iarlath Ó Tanaidheáin (Irish)
- Born: 12 April 1984 (age 42) Galway, Ireland
- Occupation: Manufacturing technician
- Height: 6 ft 3 in (191 cm)

Sport
- Sport: Hurling
- Position: Midfield/Centre Back
Club
- Years: Club
- Ardrahan
College
- Years: College
- Limerick IT
College titles
- Fitzgibbon titles: 2
Inter-county*
Years	County	Apps (scores)
2007–2016	Galway	43 (0–31)
Inter-county titles
- Leinster titles: 1
- NHL: 1
- All Stars: 1
- *Inter County team apps and scores correct as of 22:33, 9 September 2012.

Iarla Tannian (born 12 April 1984) is an Irish hurler who plays as centre back at senior level for the Galway county team.

Tannian made his first appearance for the Galway senior team during the 2007 National Hurling League and became a regular member of the starting fifteen. Since then, he has won one Leinster winners' medal and one National Hurling League winners' medal. He was named as the man of the match by The Sunday Game panel in the drawn 2012 All-Ireland Senior Hurling Championship final.

Tannian was left out of the Galway hurling panel which was named for winter training in October 2016.

Tannian plays his club hurling for Ardrahan.

== Honours ==
Team

- Fitzgibbon Cup (2) 2005, 2007
- Leinster Senior Hurling Championship (1) 2012
- National Hurling League (1) 2010
- Walsh Cup (1) 2010

Individual

- All-Ireland SHC Final Man of The Match (1) 2012 (Draw)
- GAA GPA All Stars Awards (1) 2012

Awards
Preceded by J. J. Delaney (Kilkenny)	All-Ireland SHC; Man of the Match; 2012 (first match)	Succeeded by Walter Walsh (Kilkenny)
