= Aidan Fogarty (Kilkenny hurler) =

Irish hurler (born 1982)

Personal information
- Native name: Aodán Ó Fógartaigh (Irish)
- Nickname: Taggy
- Born: 20 July 1982 (age 44) Urlingford, County Kilkenny, Ireland
- Occupation: Electronics engineer
- Height: 6 ft 0 in (183 cm)

Sport
- Sport: Hurling
- Position: Left corner-forward
Club
- Years: Club
- Emeralds
Inter-county*
Years	County	Apps (scores)
2003-2014	Kilkenny	38 (10-41)
Inter-county titles
- Leinster titles: 10
- All-Irelands: 8
- NHL: 3
- All Stars: 0
- *Inter County team apps and scores correct as of 19:17, 29 November 2014.

Aidan Fogarty (born 20 July 1982) is an Irish hurler who played as a left corner-forward for the Kilkenny senior team.

Born in Urlingford, County Kilkenny, Fogarty first arrived on the inter-county scene at the age of twenty-one when he first linked up with the Kilkenny intermediate team, before later joining the under-21 side. He joined the senior panel during the 2003 championship. Fogarty quickly became a regular member of the starting fifteen, and won five All-Ireland medals, four Leinster medals and three National League medals on the field of play. He was an All-Ireland runner-up on one occasion.

As a member of the Leinster inter-provincial team on a number of occasions, Fogarty won three Railway Cup medals. At club level, he has won one junior championship medal with Emeralds.

Throughout his career, Fogarty made 38 championship appearances. He announced his retirement from inter-county hurling on 26 November 2014.

In 2020, Fogarty appeared on the fourth season of the Irish edition of Dancing with the Stars.

== Playing career ==
=== Club ===
In 2000, Fogarty was in his last year with the Emeralds minor hurling team when he played in the championship decider. A 1–12 to 0–7 defeat of Shamrocks gave him a championship medal.

The following year, Fogarty had established himself on Emerald's top team. A 3–11 to 1–11 defeat of Windgap in the junior decider gave him a championship medal in that grade.

=== Under-21 and intermediate ===
Fogarty first played for Kilkenny in 2003 when he joined the under-21 side. He won his sole Leinster medal that year following a 0–12 to 1–4 defeat of Dublin. Kilkenny later faced Galway in the All-Ireland decider, beating them with on a scoreline of 2–13 to 0–12, and giving Fogarty an All-Ireland Under-21 Hurling Championship medal.

That same year, Fogarty was a member of the Kilkenny intermediate team. He won a Leinster medal that year following a 4–20 to 1–10 win over Dublin in the decider. Kilkenny were later beaten 1–21 to 0–23 by Cork in the All-Ireland decider.

=== Senior ===
==== Beginnings ====
Fogarty was still eligible for the under-21 grade when he was added to the Kilkenny senior panel in 2003. That year, he shared in his county's National Hurling League, Leinster and All-Ireland triumphs; however, Fogarty was yet to make his debut.

On 13 June 2004, Fogarty made his senior championship debut when he was introduced as a substitute in a 2–15 to 1-16 Leinster semi-final defeat by Wexford. Kilkenny were later defeated by Cork in the All-Ireland decider, however, Fogarty remained on the bench for that 0–17 to 0–9 loss.

==== Four-in-a-row ====
In 2006 Fogarty won his first National League medal on the field of play following a 3–11 to 0–14 victory over Limerick. On 3 September 2006 Kilkenny faced a Cork team who were presented with the opportunity to become the first side in nearly thirty years to secure three successive All-Ireland championships. Like previous encounters, neither side took a considerable lead; however, Kilkenny had a vital goal from Fogarty. Cork were in arrears coming into the final few minutes; however, Ben O'Connor scored a late goal for Cork. It was too little too late as the Cats denied Cork on a score line of 1–16 to 1–13. Fogarty collected his first All-Ireland medal on the field of play. He was later named man of the match.

On 2 September 2007, Kilkenny faced defeated Munster finalists and surprise All-Ireland semi-final winners Limerick in the championship decider. Kilkenny got off to a flying start with Eddie Brennan and Henry Shefflin scoring two goals within the first ten minutes to set the tone. Limerick launched a second-half comeback; however, "the Cats" were too powerful and cruised to a 2–19 to 1–15 victory. It was Fogarty's second All-Ireland medal.

Kilkenny secured the Leinster crown in 2008, with Fogarty collecting a first winner's medal on the field of play following a 5–21 to 0–17 defeat of Wexford. On 8 September 2008, Kilkenny faced Waterford in the All-Ireland decider for the first time in forty-five years. In a disappointingly one-sided final, Kilkenny produced a near-perfect seventy minutes as Waterford endured a nightmare afternoon. A 23-point winning margin, 3-24 from play, only two wides in the entire match and eight scorers in all, with Eddie Brennan and Henry Shefflin leading the way in a 3–30 to 1–13 victory. It was Fogarty's third All-Ireland medal.

Fogarty collected a second National League medal in 2009, as Kilkenny beat Tipperary by 2–26 to 4–17 with a thrilling extra-time victory. He later won a second successive Leinster medal, as new challengers Dublin were bested by 2–18 to 0–18. On 6 September, Kilkenny were poised to become the second team ever in the history of hurling to win four successive All-Ireland championships when they faced Tipperary in the decider. For long periods, Tipp looked the likely winners; however, late goals from Henry Shefflin and substitute Martin Comerford finally killed off their efforts to secure a 2–22 to 0–23 victory. Fogarty had collected his fourth All-Ireland medal.

==== Continued dominance ====
In 2010, Kilkenny defeated Galway in an eagerly anticipated but ultimately disappointing provincial decider. A 1–19 to 1–12 victory gave Fogarty a third Leinster medal. The drive for a fifth successive All-Ireland crown reached a head on 5 September 2010, when Kilkenny faced Tipperary in the All-Ireland decider. "The Cats" lost talisman Henry Shefflin due to injury, while Tipperary's Lar Corbett ran riot and scored a hat-trick of goals as Fogarty's side fell to a 4–17 to 1–18 defeat.

After seeing little action in 2011, Fogarty returned to championship action the following year. Kilkenny, however, were shocked by Galway in the Leinster decider, losing by 2–21 to 2–11; however, both sides subsequently met in the All-Ireland decider on 9 September 2012. Kilkenny had led going into the final stretch, however, Joe Canning struck a stoppage time equaliser to level the game at 2–13 to 0-19 and send the final to a replay for the first time since 1959. The replay took place three weeks later on 30 September 2012. Galway stunned the reigning champions with two first-half goals; however, Kilkenny's championship debutant Walter Walsh gave a man-of-the-match performance, claiming a 1-3 haul. The 3–22 to 3-11 Kilkenny victory gave Fogarty a fifth All-Ireland medal.

==== Decline ====
Kilkenny's dominance showed no sign of abating in 2013, with Fogarty winning a third National League medal following a 2–17 to 0–20 defeat of Tipperary in the decider.

In 2014, Fogarty won his fourth Leinster medal as Kilkenny dethroned reigning champions Dublin by 0–24 to 1–9. Fogarty played a bit part in Kilkenny's subsequent All-Ireland campaign, however, he collected an eighth All-Ireland medal, his third as a non-playing substitute, following a 2–17 to 2–14 defeat of Tipperary in the decider. On 26 November 2014, Fogarty announced his retirement from inter-county hurling.

=== Inter-provincial ===
In 2006, Fogarty was picked for the Leinster team that faced Connacht in the inter-provincial final. A disappointing contest resulted in a 1–23 to 0–17 victory for Leinster, and a first Railway Cup medal for Fogarty.

After surrendering their title the following year, Leinster were back in the decider once again in 2008. Richie Power top-scored with nine points as Leinster secured a 1–15 to 1–12 victory. It was Fogarty's second Railway Cup medal.

Leinster made it two in a row in 2009, with Fogarty collecting his third winner's medal as Leinster defeated Connacht by 3–18 to 1–17.

== Honours ==
=== Team ===
Emeralds

- Kilkenny Junior Hurling Championship (1): 2001
- Kilkenny Minor Hurling Championship (1): 2000

Kilkenny

- All-Ireland Senior Hurling Championship (8): 2003 (sub), 2006, 2007, 2008, 2009, 2011 (sub), 2012, 2014 (sub)
- Leinster Senior Hurling Championship (10): 2003 (sub), 2005 (sub), 2006 (sub), 2007 (sub), 2008, 2009, 2010, 2011 (sub), 2014
- National Hurling League (7): 2003 (sub), 2005 (sub), 2006, 2009, 2012 (sub), 2013, 2014 (sub)
- Walsh Cup (6): 2005, 2006, 2007, 2009, 2012, 2014
- Leinster Intermediate Hurling Championship (1): 2003
- All-Ireland Under-21 Hurling Championship (1): 2003
- Leinster Under-21 Hurling Championship (2): 2003

Leinster

- Railway Cup (3): 2006, 2008, 2009

=== Individual ===
Awards

- All-Ireland Senior Hurling Final Man of the Match (1): 2006
