= 2003 All-Ireland Under-21 Hurling Championship =

All-Ireland Under-21 Hurling Championship 2003
All Ireland Champions
- Winners: Kilkenny (8th win)
- Captain: Jackie Tyrrell
- Manager: Martin Fogarty

All Ireland Runners-up
- Runners-up: Galway
- Captain: Fergal Moore
- Manager: John Hardiman

Provincial Champions
- Munster: Tipperary
- Leinster: Kilkenny
- Ulster: Down
- Connacht: Not Played

The 2003 All-Ireland Under-21 Hurling Championship was the 40th staging of the All-Ireland Under-21 Hurling Championship since its establishment by the Gaelic Athletic Association in 1964.

Limerick were the defending champions, however, they were defeated in their quest for a record-equalling fourth successive All-Ireland title by Cork in the Munster semi-final.

On 21 September 2003, Kilkenny won the championship following a 2-13 to 0-12 defeat of Galway in the All-Ireland final. This was their 8th All-Ireland title in the under-21 grade and their first in four championship seasons.

== Results ==
=== Leinster Under-21 Hurling Championship ===
Quarter-finals

11 June 2003 Quarter-final	Kilkenny	2-18 - 0-10	Offaly	O'Moore Park, Portlaoise
	S Hennessy 1-6, A Fogarty 0-4, P Cleere 1-0, T Walsh 0-3, W O’Dwyer 0-2, C Phelan 0-2, K Coogan 0-1.		M Cordial 0-3, B Carroll 0-2, B Bergin, D Hayden, N Corcoran, M Corcoran, G Raferty 0-1 each.	Referee: E Morris (Dublin)

18 June 2003 Quarter-final	Westmeath	0-9 - 2-22	Dublin	Cusack Park, Mullingar
	D Carty 0-4, M McNicholas 0-2, B Murtagh 0-2, P Fanning 0-1.		C Keaney 1-9, S O’Neill 1-1, P Fleury 0-3, D O’Reilly 0-2, F Chambers 0-2, S Hiney 0-1, M Carton 0-1, G Keogh 0-1, S McCann 0-1, T Sweeney 0-1.	Referee: B Gavin (Offaly)

Semi-finals

24 June 2003 Semi-final	Dublin	2-16 - 0-9	Wexford	Dr. Cullen Park, Carlow
	S O'Neill (2-2), C Keaney (0-6); R Fallon (0-3), M Carton (0-1), P Fleury (0-1), T Sweeney (0-1), S O'Connor (0-1), F Chambers (0-1).		D Nolan (0-3); R Jacob (0-3), D Mythen (0-2), F Heffernan (0-1).	Referee: B Dunphy (Kilkenny)

24 June 2003 Semi-final	Laois	0-9 - 3-14	Kilkenny	O'Moore Park, Portlaoise
	J Hooban 0-3, B Ferns 0-2, J Rowney 0-1, C Brophy 0-1, C Coonan 0-1, B Phelan 0-1.		E McCormack 1-4, A Fogarty 1-2, S Hennessy 0-5, T Walsh 1-0, W O'Dwyer 0-1, M Rice 0-1, C O'Loughlin 0-1.

Final

16 July 2003 Final	Kilkenny	0-12 - 1-4	Dublin	Dr. Cullen Park, Carlow
	A Fogarty 0-3, W O’ Dwyer 0-2, S O’ Neill 0-2, K Coogan 0-2 (2f), S Hennessy 0-1; C Phelan 0-1; T Walsh 0-1.		C Keaney 1-2 (1-0 line ball, 0-2f); M Carton 0-1; D O’Callaghan 0-1.	Referee: J Kelly (Wexford)

=== Munster Under-21 Hurling Championship ===
Quarter-finals

11 June 2003 Quarter-final	Kerry	0-7 - 2-21	Clare	Austin Stack Park, Tralee
	B Donovan 0-3, B Brick 0-2, I McCarthy 0-1, G O’Brien 0-1.		A Quinn 1-5, F Lynch 1-4, B Culbert 0-4, D Kennedy 0-3, B Loughnane 0-2, M Culbert 0-1, D O’Connell 0-1, G Ryan 0-1.	Referee: J Sexton (Limerick)

11 June 2003 Quarter-final	Limerick	2-13 - 2-9	Waterford	FitzGerald Park, Kilmallock
	A O’Shaughnessy 2-3, P Kirby 0-3, E Foley 0-2, N Moran 0-2, B Murray 0-2, T Carmody 0-1.		E Kelly 0-5, S Ryan 1-1, T Kearney 1-0, P O’Brien 0-2, S Walsh 0-1.	Referee: S Harrington (Cork)

Semi-finals

9 July 2003 Semi-final	Clare	0-11 - 1-11	Tipperary	Cusack Park, Ennis
	A Quinn 0-4, B Culbert 0-2, G Ryan 0-1, F Lynch 0-1, C Crowe 0-1, P Collins 0-1, D O’Connell 0-1.		E Kelly 1-6, C O’Mahoney 0-1, P Buckley 0-1, J O’Brien 0-1, T Scroope 0-1, A O’Neill 0-1.	Referee: G Harrington (Cork)

9 July 2003 Semi-final	Cork	3-10 - 1-11	Limerick	Páirc Uí Chaoimh, Cork
	S Ó hAilpín 2-0, J Gardiner 1-0, P Tierney 0-3, D O’Riordan 0-3, F Murphy 0-2, M O’Connor 0-1, D Cashman 0-1.		P Kirby 1-5, P Russell 0-2, A O’Shaughnessy 0-1, E Foley 0-1, N Moran 0-1, T Carmody 0-1.	Referee: M Wadding (Waterford)

Final

3 August 2003 Final	Cork	0-17 - 2-14	Tipperary	Páirc Uí Chaoimh, Cork
	S Murphy 0-3, S Ó hAilpín 0-3, P Tierney 0-3, K Murphy 0-3, J Gardiner 0-2, G Callinan 0-1, M Naughton 0-1, M Coleman 0-1.		E Kelly 1-6, C O’Mahoney 1-0, F Devaney 0-2, P Buckley 0-2, J Caesar 0-1, E Ryan 0-1, J O’Brien 0-1, T Scroupe 0-1.	Referee: S McMahon (Clare)

=== Ulster Under-21 Hurling Championship ===
Final

23 July 2003 Final	Derry	1-12 - 3-12	Down	McGlinchey Park, Ballinascreen
	P Doherty 1-8, R Convery 0-1, P Quigg 0-1, C McKeever 0-1, D Magill 0-1.		S Clarke 2-1, Paul Braniff 0-7, G Johnston 1-1, B McGourty 0-1, A Dynes 0-1, M Gilmore 0-1.	Referee: G Devlin (Armagh)

=== All-Ireland Under-21 Hurling Championship ===
Semi-finals

23 August 2003 Semi-final	Kilkenny	4-19 - 1-7	Down	Cusack Park, Mullingar
	B Dowling 1-5, A Fogarty 1-3, S O’Neill 1-2, W O’Dwyer 1-2, S Hennessy 0-5, C Phelan 0-1, P Cleere 0-1.		P Braniff 1-5, G Johnson 0-2.	Referee: M Haverty (Galway)

23 August 2003 Semi-final	Galway	2-20 - 2-16 (aet)	Tipperary	Cusack Park, Ennis
	G Farragher 1-10, W Donlon 1-0, R Murray 0-2, D Greene 0-2, D Hayes 0-1, K Burke 0-1, A Cullinane 0-1, K Brady 0-1, B O’Mahony 0-1, N Healy 0-1.		E Kelly 0-10, J O’Brien 1-3, P Buckley 1-0, J Caesar 0-1, F Devanney 0-1, T Scroope 0-1.	Referee: P Horan (Offaly)

Final

21 September 2003 Final	Kilkenny	2-13 - 0-12	Galway	Semple Stadium, Thurles
	C Phelan 1-4, A Fogarty 1-1, S Hennessy 0-4, T Walsh 0-2, P Cleere 0-1, B Dowling 0-1.		G Farragher 0-7, N Healy 0-2, K Brady 0-2, JP O'Connell 0-1.	Referee: M Wadding (Waterford)

== Championship statistics ==
=== Miscellaneous ===
- Down win the Ulster title for the first time since 1990.

== Scoring statistics ==
Overall

Rank	Player	County	Tally	Total	Matches	Average
1	Eoin Kelly	Tipperary	2-22	28	3	9.33
2	Shane Hennessy	Kilkenny	1-21	24	5	4.80
3	Conal Keaney	Dublin	2-17	23	3	7.66
4	Ger Farragher	Galway	1-17	20	2	10.00

Single game

Rank	Player	County	Tally	Total	Opposition
1	Ger Farragher	Galway	1-10	13	Tipperary
2	Conal Keaney	Dublin	1-09	12	Westmeath
3	Paul Doherty	Derry	1-08	11	Down
4	Eoin Kelly	Tipperary	0-10	10	Galway
5	Andrew O'Shaughnessy	Limerick	2-03	9	Waterford
5	Shane Hennessy	Kilkenny	1-06	9	Offaly
5	Eoin Kelly	Tipperary	1-06	9	Clare
5	Eoin Kelly	Tipperary	1-06	9	Cork
9	Shane O'Neill	Dublin	2-02	8	Wexford
9	Andrew Quinn	Clare	1-05	8	Kerry
9	Pat Kirby	Limerick	1-05	8	Cork
9	Brian Dowling	Kilkenny	1-05	8	Down
9	Paul Braniff	Down	1-05	8	Kilkenny
