= 2010 Kilkenny Intermediate Hurling Championship =

- Dates: 18 September – 17 October 2010
- Teams: 12
- Sponsor: Michael Lyng Motors
- Champions: Dicksboro (2nd title); Eddie O'Donoghue (captain); Tommy Buggy (manager)
- Runners-up: Mullinavat; Willie O'Dwyer (captain)
- Relegated: Blacks and Whites

Tournament statistics
- Matches played: 12
- Goals scored: 31 (2.58 per match)
- Points scored: 289 (24.08 per match)

The 2010 Kilkenny Intermediate Hurling Championship was the 46th staging of the Kilkenny Intermediate Hurling Championship since its establishment by the Kilkenny County Board in 1929. The championship began on 18 September 2010 and ended on 17 October 2010.

The final was played on 17 October 2010 at Nowlan Park in Kilkenny, between Dicksboro and Mullinavat, in what was their first meeting in a final. Dicksboro won the match by 2–12 to 2–11 to claim their third championship title overall and a first title since 2005.

== Team changes ==
=== To Championship ===
Promoted from the Kilkenny Junior Hurling Championship

- Blacks and Whites

Relegated from the Kilkenny Senior Hurling Championship

- Young Irelands

=== From Championship ===
Promoted to the Kilkenny Senior Hurling Championship

- St. Lachtain's

Relegated to the Kilkenny Junior Hurling Championship

- Thomastown

== Results ==
=== First round ===
18 September 2010 First round	Emeralds	1-14 - 1-09	Graignamanagh	Bennettsbridge GAA Grounds
	A Fogarty 1-6, D Lyng 0-4, A Guilfoyle 0-1, P Phelan 0-1, B Campion 0-1, J Doheny 0-1.		L Kinsella 1-0, H Flood 0-3, P Whelan 0-3, C Dunne 0-2, E Walsh 0-1.

19 September 2010 First round	Rower-Inistioge	0-17 - 0-11	Glenmore	Thomastown GAA Grounds
	J Lyng 0-4, M Doyle 0-4, C Joyce 0-3, J Cassin 0-2, T Murphy 0-1, R Galvin 0-1, M Grace 0-1, P Tierney 0-1.		E Murphy 0-5, G Aylward 0-4, R Mullally 0-1, E Vereker 0-1.

19 September 2010 First round	Tullogher-Rosbercon	1-14 - 1-11	Blacks and Whites	Thomastown GAA Grounds
	L Barron 0-5, R Dollard 1-0, E Conway 0-3, P Hartley 0-2, J Barron 0-1, E Mullally 0-1, J Mullally 0-1, E Cullinane 0-1.		N Kennedy 0-5, T Farrell 1-1, M Moloney 0-2, M Ryan 0-2, J Foley 0-1.

19 September 2010 First round	Conahy Shamrocks	3-06 - 1-11	Mooncoin	Nowlan Park
	M Lawlor 1-3, A Healy 1-1, G Nolan 1-0, G Kavanagh 0-1, P Vickery 0-1.		K Kirwan 1-2, D Mackey 0-4, E Mackey 0-2, D Purcell 0-1, T Henebry 0-1, PJ Rowe 0-1.

=== Relegation playoff ===
16 October 2010 Playoff	Graignamanagh	2-18 - 1-10	Blacks and Whites	Nowlan Park

=== Quarter-finals ===
25 September 2010 Quarter-final	Dicksboro	2-16 - 3-09	Emeralds	Páirc Lachtáin
	P O'Flynn 2-2, E O'Donoghue 0-8, A Stapleton 0-3, O Walsh 0-2, C Buckley 0-1.		A Fogarty 0-7, A Guilfoyle 1-1, B Campion 1-0, E Ryan 1-0, E O'Gorman 0-1.

25 September 2010 Quarter-final	Danesfort	3-15 - 3-07	Tullogher-Rosbercon	Mullinavat GAA Grounds

26 September 2010 Quarter-final	Mullinavat	0-17 - 0-14	Rower-Inistioge	Thomastown GAA Grounds

26 September 2010 Quarter-final	Young Irelands	1-14 - 1-11	Conahy Shamrocks	Bennettsbridge GAA Grounds

==== Semi-final ====
3 October 2010 Semi-final	Mullinavat	0-15 - 1-09	Danesfort	Nowlan Park

3 October 2010 Semi-final	Dicksboro	2-14 - 0-04	Young Irelands	Nowlan Park

=== Final ===
17 October 2010 Final	Dicksboro	2-12 - 2-11	Mullinavat	Nowlan Park
	A Stapleton 2-1, E O'Donoghue 0-6, D O'Gorman 0-2, C Buckley 0-1, C Starr 0-1, P O'Flynn 0-1.		C Conway 1-5, P Raftice 1-0, N Anthony 0-2, M Murphy 0-2, D Aylward 0-1, D Butler 0-1.
