= 2008 Kilkenny Intermediate Hurling Championship =

- Dates: 20 September – 19 October 2008
- Teams: 12
- Sponsor: Joe Coogan Auctioneers
- Champions: Erin's Own (2nd title); Tom Brophy (captain); Donal Dunne (manager)
- Runners-up: Danesfort
- Relegated: John Locke's

Tournament statistics
- Matches played: 13
- Goals scored: 30 (2.31 per match)
- Points scored: 289 (22.23 per match)
- Top scorer(s): Richie Hogan (0-27)

The 2008 Kilkenny Intermediate Hurling Championship was the 44th staging of the Kilkenny Intermediate Hurling Championship since its establishment by the Kilkenny County Board in 1929. The championship ran from 20 September to 19 October 2008.

The final was played on 19 October 2008 at Nowlan Park in Kilkenny, between Erin's Own and Danesfort, in what was their first ever meeting in the final. Erin's Own won the match by 2–10 to 1–10 to claim their second championship title overall and a first championship title in five years.

== Results ==
=== First round ===
20 September 2008 First round	Glenmore	0-12 - 1-12	Graignamanagh	Thomastown Grounds
	P Mullally 0-4, R Mullally 0-2, M Phelan 0-2, E Vereker 0-1, M Phelan 0-1, S Kirwan 0-1.		E Walsh 1-3, P Whelan 0-5, C Dunne 0-3, G Walsh 0-1.

20 September 2008 First round	Mooncoin	3-11 - 2-10	Thomastown	Mullinavat Grounds
	E Hennebry 1-1, T Kearns 1-0, K Kirwan 1-0, T O'Hanlon 0-2, R Wall 0-2, D Mackey 0-2, S Wall 0-2, M Fitzgerald 0-1, M Grace 0-1.		JJ Farrell 1-2, M Mahony 1-1, S Waugh 0-3, D Walsh 0-3, S Lanigan 0-1.

21 September 2008 First round	John Locke's	2-12 - 3-12	St Lachtain's	Tom Ryall Park
	J O'Neill 1-4, A Bergin 1-2, M Gordon 0-3, N Hennessy 0-1, J Power 0-1, R Jackman 0-1.		N Waldron 0-7, J Fitzpatrick 1-1, R Dowling 1-0, E Guinan 1-0, B Beckett 0-1, J Kavanagh 0-1, N McGree 0-1, P Guinan 0-1.

21 September 2008 First round	Danesfort	2-14 - 3-09	Mullinavat	Páirc na Seamróg
	R Hogan 0-8, P Forristal 1-1, D Forristal 1-0, P Hogan 0-2, R Walsh 0-2, P Walsh 0-1.		J Fennelly 2-0, W O'Dwyer 1-3, P Aylward 0-2, I Duggan 0-2, M Murphy 0-1, N Anthony 0-1.

=== Relegation playoff ===
4 October 2008 Playoff	Glenmore	2-10 - 1-12	John Locke's	Thomastown Grounds
	G Aylward 0-3, D Beirne 1-0, E Vereker 1-0, E Murphy 0-2, P Mullally 0-2, D Aylward 0-1, S Kirwan 0-1, M Phelan 0-1.		JP Corcoran 1-1, J Power 0-4, J O'Neill 0-3, P Kennedy 0-1, B Cahill 0-1, D Lynch 0-1, M Gordon 0-1.

=== Quarter-finals ===
27 September 2008 Quarter-final	Erin's Own	1-10 - 0-13	St Lachtain's	St Patrick's Park
	D Fogarty 0-4, J Byrne 1-0, M Boran 0-3, R Ryan 0-1, C Fogarty 0-1, D Buggy 0-1.		N Waldron 0-9, B Beckett 0-3, N McGree 0-1.

28 September 2008 Quarter-final	Conahy Shamrocks	1-09 - 1-13	Danesfort	St John's Park
	M Lawlor 0-5, P Nolan 1-0, K Mooney 0-2, D Buggy 0-1, J Nolan 0-1.		R Hogan 0-7, F Manogue 1-1, R Walsh 0-3, P Murphy 0-1, A Dunne 0-1.

28 September 2008 Quarter-final	Emeralds	0-16 - 1-05	Graignamanagh	Páirc Dhroichead Binéid
	A Guilfoyle 0-6, D Lyng 0-4, R Moriarty 0-2, E Kavanagh 0-2, P Phelan 0-1, A Fogarty 0-1.		E Walsh 1-0, G Dowling 0-2, J Bolger 0-1, P Whelan 0-1, C Dunne 0-1.

28 September 2008 Quarter-final	Rower-Inistioge	1-12 - 1-13	Mooncoin	Mullinavat Grounds
	M Doyle 0-7, P Tierney 1-0, M Grace 0-2, S Grace 0-1, R Galavan 0-1, M Meaney 0-1.		R Wall 0-6, D Mackey 1-1, K Kirwan 0-2, E Mackey 0-1, E Hennebry 0-1, PJ Rowe 0-1, M Grace 0-1.

5 October 2008 Quarter-final replay	Erin's Own	0-11 - 0-10	St Lachtain's	Nowlan Park
	D Buggy 0-4, D Fogarty 0-3, M Boran 0-2, C Dunne 0-1, M Moran 0-1.		E Guinan 0-5, M Kavanagh 0-1, C Waldron 0-1, B Beckett 0-1, N Waldron 0-1, N McGree 0-1.

=== Semi-finals ===
5 October 2008 Semi-final	Danesfort	0-12 - 0-11	Emeralds	Nowlan Park
	R Hogan 0-8, P Walsh 0-2, P Hogan 0-1, P Forristal 0-1.		A Guilfoyle 0-7, D Lyng 0-1, K Rafter 0-1, E Kavanagh 0-1.

11 October 2008 Semi-final	Mooncoin	1-07 - 1-13	Erin's Own	Nowlan Park
	R Wall 0-5, K Kirwan 1-0, D Mackey 0-1, E Hennebry 0-1.		D Buggy 0-6, E Brennan 1-2, D Fogarty 0-1, J Byrne 0-1, M Owens 0-1, C Fogarty 0-1, M Murphy 0-1.

=== Final ===
19 October 2008 Final	Erin's Own	2-10 - 1-10	Danesfort	Nowlan Park
	D Buggy 1-4, M Boran 1-3, E Brennan 0-1, R Ryan 0-1, M Moran 0-1.		R Hogan 0-4, A Dunne 1-0, P Hogan 0-2, P Forristal 0-2, P Treacy 0-1, R Walsh 0-1.

== Championship statistics ==
=== Top scorers ===
Rank	Player	Club	Tally	Total	Matches	Average
1	Richie Hogan	Danesfort	0-27	27	4	6.75
2	Davy Buggy	Erin's Own	1-15	18	4	4.50
3	Naoise Waldron	St Lachtain's	0-17	17	3	5.66
4	Alan Guilfoyle	Emeralds	0-13	13	2	6.50
4	Ray Wall	Mooncoin	0-13	13	3	4.33
