= 2025 Kilkenny Intermediate Hurling Championship =

Annual hurling competition season

- Dates: 13 September - 19 October 2025
- Teams: 12
- Sponsor: Michael Lyng Motors Hyundai
- Champions: Danesfort (4th title); Diarmuid Phelan (captain); Adrian Burke (manager)
- Runners-up: James Stephens; Eoin Larkin (manager)
- Relegated: Fenians

Tournament statistics
- Matches played: 12
- Goals scored: 32 (2.67 per match)
- Points scored: 399 (33.25 per match)
- Top scorer(s): Anthony Ireland-Wall (2-16)

The 2025 Kilkenny Intermediate Hurling Championship was the 61st staging of the Kilkenny Intermediate Hurling Championship since its establishment by the Kilkenny County Board in 1929. The championship ran from 13 September to 19 October 2025.

The final was played on 19 October 2025 at UPMC Nowlan Park in Kilkenny, between Danesfort and James Stephens, in what was their first ever meeting in the final. Danesfort won the match by 2-20 to 1-16 to claim their fourth championship title overall and a first title in three years.

Anthony Ireland-Wall was the championship's top scorer with 2-16.

== Team changes ==
=== To Championship ===
Promoted from the Kilkenny Premier Junior Hurling Championship

- St Lachtain's

Relegated from the Kilkenny Senior Hurling Championship

- James Stephens

=== From Championship ===
Promoted to the Kilkenny Senior Hurling Championship

- Lisdowney

Relegated to the Kilkenny Premier Junior Hurling Championship

- Conahy Shamrocks

== Fixtures/results ==
=== First round ===
| 13 September 2025 First round | Blacks and Whites | 0-17 - 1-11 | Fenians | Páirc Dhroichead Binéid |
| | R Murphy 0-10, I Foley 0-2, S Byrne 0-1, P Murphy 0-1, M Prendergast 0-1, A Foley 0-1, M Kelly 0-1. | | C Tobin 0-5, W Brennan 1-0, M Webster 0-2, C Phelan 0-2, A Duggan 0-1, R Garrett 0-1. |

| 13 September 2025 First round | Mooncoin | 6-23 - 1-15 | Rower–Inistioge | Mullinavat Grounds |
| | L Hogan 1-8, A Croke 3-1, C Quilty 0-4, K Hogan 1-1, A Carroll 1-1, M O'Neill 0-2, R Doherty 0-2, S Crowley 0-1, S Gannon 0-1, M Gannon 0-1. | | E Lyng 1-10, K Murphy 0-2, E O'Brien 0-1, J Ryan 0-1, T Doyle 0-1. |

| 14 September 2025 First round | St Martin's | 1-13 - 4-14 | St Lachtain's | St Patrick's Park |
| | S Kinsella 0-6, S Hunt 1-1, A Comerford 0-1, J Mulhall 0-1, J Coogan 0-1, J Morrissey 0-1. | | C O'Leary 1-10, D Maher 2-1, S Donnelly 1-0, C Donnelly 0-2, P Killeen 0-1. |

| 14 September 2025 First round | Tullogher–Rosbercon | 2-21 - 2-14 | Carrickshock | Páirc na Seamróg |
| | A Murphy 1-9, M Murphy 0-5, D Glennon 1-2, C O'Sullivan 0-2, C Hennessy 0-1, J Lyng 0-1, B Walsh 0-1. | | A Franks 1-6, J O'Dwyer 0-5, E O'Neill 1-1, J Power 0-2. |

=== Relegation playoff ===
| 27 September 2025 Playoff | St Martin's | 2-11 - 0-15 | Fenians | St Patrick's Park |
| | S Kinsella 0-6, J Coogan 1-1, S Hunt 1-0, B Coady 0-3, O Kelly 0-1. | Report | M Webster 0-7, C Phelan 0-2, C Tobin 0-2, M Hughes 0-2, A Duggan 0-1, W Brennan 0-1. |

=== Quarter-finals ===
| 20 September 2025 Quarter-final | St Lachtain's | 1-10 - 0-25 | Young Irelands | Canon Kearns Park |
| | C O'Leary 0-5, S Donnelly 1-0, M Donnelly 0-2, B Quinn 0-1, C Donnelly 0-1, C Dawson 0-1. | | K Carey 0-5, P Langton 0-5, P O'Neill 0-3, C Phelan 0-2, T Langton 0-2, T Drea 0-2, J Conlon 0-2, J Byrne 0-1, S Farrell 0-1, D Langton 0-1, P Naddy 0-1. |

| 20 September 2025 Quarter-final | Dunnamaggin | 0-19 - 0-15 | Tullogher–Rosbercon | Mullinavat Grounds |
| | D Walsh 0-11, John Fitzpatrick 0-3, A Hickey 0-2, Joe Fitzpatrick 0-2, E Kearney 0-1. | | A Murphy 0-9, C O'Sullivan 0-3, P Hartley 0-1, C Hennessy 0-1, J Lyng 0-1. |

| 21 September 2025 Quarter-final | James Stephens | 1-28 - 1-07 | Blacks and Whites | UPMC Nowlan Park |
| | L Scanlon 0-8, C Kenny 0-5, S Bergin 0-4, S Manogue 1-0, T O'Dwyer 0-3, S Deeley 0-2, E Guilfoyle 0-2, E Lauhoff 0-2, W Spencer 0-2. | | R Murphy 1-3, S Byrne 0-3, I Foley 0-1. |

| 21 September 2025 Quarter-final | Danesfort | 2-17 - 0-17 | Mooncoin | UPMC Nowlan Park |
| | A Ireland-Wall 1-2, S Hayes 1-0, P Murphy 0-3, C Kearney 0-2, D Dunne 0-2, A Cowley 0-2, D O'Neill 0-2, P Hogan 0-1, C O'Neill 0-1, D Dowling 0-1, C Phelan 0-1. | | L Hogan 0-5, C Quilty 0-5, M O'Neill 0-1, A Croke 0-1, J Delahunty 0-1, K Hogan 0-1, A Carroll 0-1, S Gannon 0-1, P Hennebry 0-1. |

=== Semi-finals ===
| 5 October 2025 Semi-final | Dunnamaggin | 0-17 - 3-13 | Danesfort | UPMC Nowlan Park |
| | D Walsh (0-9, 5fs and 1 ‘65); J Fitzpatrick (0-4, 2fs); P Kirwan (0-3); R Holden (0-1) | Report | A Ireland Wall (0-7, 4fs); B McDonald (1-2); C Phelan, S Hayes (1-0 each); C Kearney, P Hogan (0-1, 1f each); D Dunne, P Murphy (0-1 each) |

| 5 October 2025 Semi-final | James Stephens | 1-18 - 1-13 | Young Irelands | UPMC Nowlan Park |
| | T O’Dwyer (0-7, 4fs); S Manogue (1-1); L Scanlon (0-3); C Kenny (0-2); O Bateman, W Spencer, E Guilfoyle, N Mullins (0-1 each) | Report | T Drea (0-4); P Langton (1-0); K Carey (0-2, 2fs); D Langton, C Phelan (0-2 each); J Conlon, S Farrell, M Carey (0-1 each) |

=== Final ===
| 19 October 2025 Final | Danesfort | 2-20 - 1-16 | James Stephens | UPMC Nowlan Park |
| | A Ireland-Wall 1-7, F Mahony 1-1, C Kearney 0-4, S Hayes 0-4, D O'Neill 0-2, P Murphy 0-1, A Crowley 0-1. | Report | T O'Dwyer 0-5, S Manogue 1-1, C Kenny 0-2, L Scanlon 0-2, S Donohoe 0-2, W Spencer 0-1, E Lauhoff 0-1, E Guilfoyle 0-1, S Deely 0-1. |

== Championship statistics ==
=== Top scorers ===
| Rank | Player | Club | Tally | Total | Matches | Average |
|---|---|---|---|---|---|---|
| 1 | Anthony Ireland-Wall | Danesfort | 2-16 | 22 | 3 | 7.33 |
| 2 | Andrew Murphy | Tullogher–Rosbercon | 1-18 | 21 | 2 | 10.50 |
| 3 | Denis Walsh | Dunnamaggin | 0-20 | 20 | 2 | 10.00 |
| 4 | Cathal O'Leary | St Lachtain's | 1-15 | 18 | 2 | 9.00 |
| 5 | Ryan Murphy | Blacks and Whites | 1-13 | 16 | 2 | 8.00 |
| 5 | Liam Hogan | Mooncoin | 1-13 | 16 | 2 | 8.00 |
| 7 | Tadhg O'Dwyer | James Stephens | 0-15 | 15 | 3 | 5.00 |
| 8 | Eoghan Lynch | Rower–Inistioge | 1-10 | 13 | 1 | 13.00 |
| 8 | Luke Scanlon | James Stephens | 0-13 | 13 | 3 | 4.33 |
| 10 | Shane Kinsella | St Martin's | 0-12 | 12 | 2 | 6.00 |
