= 2014 Kilkenny Intermediate Hurling Championship =

- Dates: 13 September – 9 November 2014
- Teams: 12
- Sponsor: Michael Lyng Motors
- Champions: Mullinavat (4th title); Willie O'Dwyer (captain); Declan Wall (manager)
- Runners-up: St. Patricks; John Mooney (captain); Tommy Buggy (manager)
- Relegated: Glenmore

Tournament statistics
- Matches played: 13
- Goals scored: 36 (2.77 per match)
- Points scored: 364 (28 per match)
- Top scorer(s): Cian O'Donoghue (3-22)

The 2014 Kilkenny Intermediate Hurling Championship was the 50th staging of the Kilkenny Intermediate Hurling Championship since its establishment by the Kilkenny County Board in 1929. The championship began on 13 September 2014 and ended on 9 November 2014.

On 9 November 2014, Mullinavat won the championship after a 0–17 to 0–14 victory over St. Patrick's Ballyragget in the final at Nowlan Park. It was their fourth title overall and their first title since 2006.

Tullogher-Rosbercon's Cian O'Donoghue was the championship's top scorer with 3-22.

== Results ==
=== First round ===
13 September 2014 First round	Graigue-Ballycallan	0-18 - 2-06	Glenmore	Páirc na Seamróg
14:30	P Cahill 0-8, E Brennan 0-2, N Millea 0-2, W O'Connor 0-2, B Murphy 0-1, G Cleere 0-1, B Ryan 0-1, J Murphy 0-1.		E Murphy 1-2, M Aylward 1-0, A Murphy 0-1, G Aylward 0-1, L Hennessy 0-1, E Vereker 0-1.	Referee: M O'Sullivan

13 September 2014 First round	Tullogher-Rosbercon	2-14 - 1-13	St. Lachtain's	Bennettsbridge
17:00	C O'Donoghue 1-10, W Walsh 1-1, B Lawlor 0-1, L Barron 0-1, J Barron 0-1.		S Donnelly 1-2, B Kennedy 0-3, L Hickey 0-2, M Kavanagh 0-2, J Maher 0-1, J Fitzpatrick 0-1, M Farrell 0-1.	Referee: J Walsh

13 September 2014 First round	Conahy Shamrocks	0-14 - 2-15	Dunnamaggin	Kells Road Venue
17:00	S Brennan 0-6, T Phelan 0-3, M Lawler 0-2, G Nolan 0-1, K Mooney 0-1, P Buggy 0-1.		K Moore 0-10, J Fitzpatrick 1-0, S Connery 1-0, R Coffey 0-2, P Kenneally 0-1, T Maher 0-1, W Phelan 0-1.	Referee: Paul Hunston

14 September 2014 First round	Young Irelands	2-15 - 2-15	Emeralds	Canon Kearns Park
11:30	P Holden 0-6, P Kehoe 1-0, S Kehoe 0-3, JP Treacy 0-3, P Delahunty 0-1, D Carroll 0-1, S Carey 0-1.		A Fogarty 1-6, I Grant 1-0, S Norton 0-3, P Doheny 0-2, P Phelan 0-2, A Guilfoyle 0-1, F Clohessy 0-1.	Referee: R Byrne

5 October 2014 First round Replay	Young Irelands	2-19 - 3-13	Emeralds	Canon Kearns Park
15:00	P Holden 0-11, S Kehoe 2-1, D Carroll 0-3, T Carroll 0-2, JJ Lennon 0-1, P Delahunty 0-1.		A Fogarty 1-7, I Grant 1-1, A Guilfoyle 1-0, C Martin 0-2, S Norton 0-2, J Ryan 0-1.	Referee: P Dunphy

=== Relegation play-off ===
11 October 2014 Play-off	Conahy Shamrocks	2-22- 3-16	Glenmore	Páirc na Seamróg
16:30	S Brennan (0-11, 0-7 frees & 0-1 '65); A Healy (1-3); K Mooney (1-3, 0-1 free); T Phelan (0-3), J Mullan (0-1); G Kavanagh (0-1).		A Murphy 1-7, E Murphy 1-2, E Vereker 1-1, G Aylward 0-2, M Aylward 0-2, L Hennessy 0-1, S Murphy 0-1.	Referee: E Ryan

=== Quarter-finals ===
11 October 2014 Quarter-final	Mullinavat	2-18 - 4-10	Young Irelands	Kells Road
14:00	J Walsh 1-7, J Fennelly 1-1, I Duggan 0-3, S Aylward 0-3, M Mansfield 0-2, G Malone 0-1.		P Holden 1-5, S Keohe 1-2, P Delahunty 1-0, D Carroll 1-0, P Kehoe 0-1, J Foley 0-1, J Morris 0-1.	Referee: R Byrne

11 October 2014 Quarter-final	Lisdowney	0-13 - 1-13	Tullogher-Rosbercon	Bennettsbridge
16:00	R Hickey 0-4, K Sweeney 0-2, A Fogarty 0-1, P O'Carroll 0-1, M Kenny 0-1, S Phelan 0-1, P Bergin 0-1, E Hickey 0-1, C O'Carroll 0-1.		C O'Donoghue 1-5, C Hennessy 0-3, L Barron 0-2, W Walsh 0-1, M Cotterell 0-1, B Lawler 0-1.	Referee: J Walsh

12 October 2014 Quarter-final	Thomastown	2-10 - 0-19	Graigue-Ballycallan	Palmerstown
14:00	M Donnelly 0-6, JJ Farrell 1-1, S Waugh 1-1, D Brennan 0-1, J Barron 0-1.		P Cahill 0-10, E Brennan 0-4, P Kennedy 0-2, B Murphy 0-1, S Butler 0-1, B Ryan 0-1.	Referee: M O'Sullivan

12 October 2014 Quarter-final	St. Patrick's	2-14 - 0-13	Dunnamaggin	St. John's Park
16:00	K Kelly 0-6, J Brennan 1-1, J Phelan 0-4, C Delaney 1-0, M Brennan 0-1, B Phelan 0-1, B Staunton 0-1.		K Moore 0-9, W Phelan 0-2, R Coffey 0-1, T Maher 0-1.	Referee: P Burke

=== Semi-finals ===
26 October 2014 Semi-final	Tullogher Rosbercon	1-13 - 2-12	Mullinavat	Nowlan Park
13:30	C O'Donoghue 1-7, C Hennessy 0-2, W Walsh 0-2, M Cotterell 0-1, E Cullinane 0-1.		W O'Dwyer 1-2, J Walsh 0-5, J Fennelly 1-0, D Butler 0-2, M Mansfield 0-1, S Aylward 0-1, D Kenneally 0-1.	Referee: P Burke

26 October 2014 Semi-final	St. Patrick's	0-13 - 1-05	Graigue-Ballycallan	Nowlan Park
15:15	K Kelly 0-8, J Brennan 0-3, S Kenny 0-1, B Phelan 0-1.		E Brennan 1-2, P Cahill 0-2, P Kennedy 0-1.	Referee: R Dowling

=== Final ===
9 November 2014 Final	Mullinavat	0-17 - 0-14	St. Patrick's	Nowlan Park
14:45	J Wash 0-9, G Malone 0-3, M Mansfield 0-3, J Gahan 0-1, I Duggan 0-1.		K Kelly 0-9, M Brennan 0-2, B Staunton 0-1, J Brennan 0-1, S Kenny 0-1.	Referee: S Cleere

== Championship statistics ==
=== Top scorers ===
Overall

Rank	Player	County	Tally	Total	Matches	Average
1	Cian O'Donoghue	Tullogher-Rosbercon	3-22	31	3	10.33
2	Paul Holden	Young Irelands	1-22	25	3	8.33
3	John Walsh	Mullinavat	1-21	24	3	8.00
4	Kevin Kelly	St. Patrick's	0-23	23	3	7.66
5	Philip Cahill	Graigue-Ballycallan	0-20	20	3	6.66
6	Aidan Fogarty	Emeralds	2-13	19	2	8.50
6	Kenny Moore	Dunnamaggin	0-19	19	2	8.50
8	Shane Brennan	Conahy Shamrocks	0-17	17	2	8.50
9	Seán Kehoe	Young Irelands	3-06	15	3	5.00
10	Eddie Brennan	Graigue-Ballycallan	1-08	11	3	3.66
10	Alan Murphy	Glenmore	1-08	11	2	5.50

In a single game

Rank	Player	County	Tally	Total	Opposition
1	Cian O'Donoghue	Tullogher-Rosbercon	1-10	13	St. Lachtain's
2	Paul Holden	Young Irelands	0-11	11	Emeralds
2	Shane Brennan	Conahy Shamrocks	0-11	11	Glenmore
4	Aidan Fogarty	Emeralds	1-07	10	Young Irelands
4	Alan Murphy	Glenmore	1-07	10	Conahy Shamrocks
4	John Walsh	Mullinavat	1-07	10	Young Irelands
4	Cian O'Donoghue	Tullogher-Rosbercon	1-07	10	Mullinavat
4	Kenny Moore	Dunnamaggin	0-10	10	Conahy Shamrocks
4	Philip Cahill	Graigue-Ballycallan	0-10	10	Thomastown
10	Aidan Fogarty	Emeralds	1-06	9	Young Irelands
10	Kenny Moore	Dunnamaggin	0-09	9	St. Patrick's
10	John Walsh	Mullinavat	0-09	9	St. Patrick's
10	Kevin Kelly	St. Patrick's	0-09	9	Mullinavat
