= 2000 Kilkenny Intermediate Hurling Championship =

- Dates: 19 August – 12 November 2000
- Teams: 12
- Sponsor: Vale Oil
- Champions: Dunnamaggin (2nd title); Seán Ryan (captain)
- Runners-up: St. Martin's; John Maher (captain)
- Relegated: Tullogher-Rosbercon

Tournament statistics
- Matches played: 18
- Goals scored: 52 (2.89 per match)
- Points scored: 388 (21.56 per match)

The 2000 Kilkenny Intermediate Hurling Championship was the 36th staging of the Kilkenny Intermediate Hurling Championship since its establishment by the Kilkenny County Board in 1929. The championship ran from 19 August to 12 November 2000.

The final was played on 22 October 2000 at Nowlan Park in Kilkenny, between Dunnamaggin and St Martin's, in what was their first ever meeting in the final. Dunnamaggin won the match by 5–09 to 1–06 to claim their second championship title overall and a first title in five years.

== Results ==
=== First round ===
19 August 2000 First round	Bennettsbridge	3-07 - 1-11	Graignamanagh	Thomastown Grounds

19 August 2000 First round	Carrickshock	1-12 - 0-13	Tullogher–Rosbercon	Mullinavat Grounds

20 August 2000 First round	St Lachtain's	1-14 - 2-09	Rower–Inistioge	Bennettsbridge Grounds

20 August 2000 First round	Mooncoin	1-11 - 1-11	Blacks and Whites	Páirc na Seamróg

9 September 2000 First round replay	Mooncoin	1-14 - 2-08	Blacks and Whites	Páirc na Seamróg

=== Relegation stage ===
30 September 2000 Semi-final	Rower–Inistioge	1-12 - 1-12	Tullogher–Rosbercon	Páirc na Seamróg

30 September 2000 Semi-final	Graignamanagh	3-14 - 3-08	Blacks and Whites	Páirc na Seamróg

21 October 2000 Semi-final replay	Rower–Inistioge	1-16 - 2-09	Tullogher–Rosbercon	Thomastown Grounds

12 November 2000 Final	Blacks and Whites	2-15 - 1-04	Tullogher–Rosbercon	Thomastown Grounds

=== Quarter-finals ===
20 September 2000 Quarter-final	Dunnamaggin	1-15 - 1-05	Carrickshock	Páirc na Seamróg

23 September 2000 Quarter-final	Mullinavat	1-10 - 1-07	Bennettsbridge	Carrickshock Grounds

24 September 2000 Quarter-final	St Martin's	1-10 - 1-10	St Lachtain's	St Patrick's Park

24 September 2000 Quarter-final	Mooncoin	0-13 - 0-13	Thomastown	Mullinavat Grounds

30 September 2000 Quarter-final replay	St Martin's	2-12 - 2-10	St Lachtain's	St Patrick's Park

1 October 2000 Quarter-final replay	Mooncoin	1-08 - 2-09	Thomastown	Mullinavat Grounds

=== Semi-finals ===
8 October 2000 Semi-final	St Martin's	2-22 - 1-11	Thomastown	Nowlan Park
	N Moloney 2-1, D Lawlor 0-7, J Maher 0-4, J Dooley 0-3, B Ryan 0-2, L Dowling 0-2, P Maher 0-2, P Shore 0-1.		P Treacy 0-5, D Lanigan 1-0, S Lanigan 0-3, B O'Keeffe 0-2, Davy Walsh 0-1.

15 October 2000 Semi-final	Dunnamaggin	1-12 - 2-06	Mullinavat	Nowlan Park
	C Herity 0-4, M O'Neill 1-0, K Moore 0-3, E Kennedy 0-1, S Ryan 0-1, R Cahill 0-1, K O'Shea 0-1, N McCormack 0-1.		M Dunphy 1-4, Maurice Murphy 1-0, P Hoban 0-1, R Carroll 0-1.

=== Final ===
22 October 2000 Final	Dunnamaggin	5-09 - 1-06	St Martin's	Nowlan Park
	K O'Shea 3-2, C Herity 1-4, N McCormack 1-0, E Kennedy 0-1, S Ryan 0-1, R Cahill 0-1.		N Moloney 1-2, D Lawlor 0-1, J Dooley 0-1, J Maher 0-1, T Kinsella 0-1.
