= 2026 Kilkenny Intermediate Hurling Championship =

Annual hurling competition season

- Dates: 12 September – 18 October 2026
- Teams: 12
- Sponsor: Michael Lyng Motors Hyundai
- Champions: James Stephens (1st title); Cian Kenny (captain); Eoin Larkin (manager)
- Runners-up: Rower-Inistioge; Richie Leahy (captain); Thomas Gleeson (manager)
- Relegated: St Martin's

Tournament statistics
- Matches played: 12
- Goals scored: 27 (2.25 per match)
- Points scored: 457 (38.08 per match)
- Top scorer: Eoghan Lyng (2–27)

The 2026 Kilkenny Intermediate Hurling Championship is the 62nd staging of the Kilkenny Intermediate Hurling Championship since its establishment by the Kilkenny County Board in 1929. The championship is scheduled to run from 12 September to October 2026.

St Martin's were relegated to the Kilkenny Premier JHC for the first time since the club's formation in 1982.

The final was played on 18 October 2026 at UPMC Nowlan Park in Kilkenny, between James Stephens and Rower-Inistioge, in what was their first ever meeting in the final. James Stephens won the match by 1–16 to 0–16 to claim their first ever championship title.

Eoghan Lyng was the championship's top scorer with 2–27.

== Team changes ==
=== To Championship ===
Promoted from the Kilkenny Premier Junior Hurling Championship

- Barrow Rangers

Relegated from the Kilkenny Senior Hurling Championship

- Lisdowney

=== From Championship ===
Promoted to the Kilkenny Senior Hurling Championship

- Danesfort

Relegated to the Kilkenny Premier Junior Hurling Championship

- Fenians

== Fixtures and results ==
=== First round ===
13 September 2026 First round	Tullogher–Rosbercon	1-26 - 1-24	Carrickshock	Mullinavat Grounds
	D Glennon (1-7, 3fs); A Murphy (0-6, 3fs); W Walsh (0-5, 2fs and 1 ‘65); J Lyng (0-4); S Hanrahan, M Murphy, C O’Sullivan, L Murphy (0-1 each)	Report	C Farrell (1-14, 11fs); E O’Neill, J O’Dwyer (0-2 each); B Donovan, M Murphy, M Rohan, P Lennon, E Martin, M Rice (0-1 each)

13 September 2026 First round	Young Irelands	0-28 - 0-12	Blacks and Whites	Clara Grounds
	P O’Neill (0-6); K Barcoe (0-5); P Langton (0-5, 1f), T Drea (0-3); T Langton, C Phelan (0-2 each); K Carey (0-2, 1f); P Brennan, M Walsh, J Conlon (0-1 each)	Report	R Murphy (0-5, 2fs); P Murphy, M Kelly, A Foley (0-2 each); S Byrne (0-1)

13 September 2026 First round	Mooncoin	0-19 - 2-21	Barrow Rangers	Danesfort Grounds
	K Hogan (0-8, 3fs); L Hogan, R Doherty (0-3, 1f each); P Henebery (0-2); A Carroll, A Croke, M O’Neill (0-1 each)	Report	J Healy (1-6, 5fs); B Hanlon (1-3); J Kelly (0-5); K O’Neill (0-1, 1f); P Purcell, K Flavin, M Doyle, G Hill, S McDonald, K Rudkins (0-1 each)

13 September 2026 First round	St Lachtain's	0-22 - 0-12	St Martin's	Canon Kearns Park
	C O’Leary (0-8, 3fs and 1 ‘65); P Killeen, C Donnelly (0-4 each); S Donnelly (0-3); A Rafter (0-2); D Maher (0-1)	Report	S Kinsella (0-7, 7fs); J O’Neill (0-2); O Kelly (0-1, 1f); J Coogan, S Hunt (0-1 each)

=== Relegation playoff ===
26 September 2026 Playoff	St Martin's	1-14 - 2-16	Blacks and Whites	John Locke Park
	S Kinsella 0-6, O Kelly 0-4, S Hunt 1-1, J O'Neill 0-2, M Keane 0-1.		R Murphy 0-8, S Byrne 1-3, J Byrne 1-1, P Murphy 0-2, L Brennan 0-1, N Kennedy 0-1.

=== Quarter-finals ===
19 September 2026 Quarter-final	Lisdowney	2-23 - 1-24 (aet)	Young Irelands	Comerford Park
	B Kavanagh 1-7, C Jordan 1-2, N Brennan 0-4, C Brennan 0-3, M Kenny 0-3, L Holohan 0-1, E McEvoy 0-1, A Tallis 0-1, D O'Carroll 0-1.		K Carey 1-11, T Drea 0-3, D Carey 0-2, S Farrell 0-2, P Langton 0-2, C Phelan 0-1, B Brennan 0-1, J Conlon 0-1, T Langton 0-1.

20 September 2026 Quarter-final	Dunnamaggin	1-14 - 3-14	Tullogher–Rosbercon	Thomastown Grounds
	D Walsh 0-6, P Kirwan 1-0, B Hickey 0-3, R O'Neill 0-2, J Fitzpatrick 0-2, A Hickey 0-1.	Report	D Glennon 1-2, A Murphy 0-5, W Walsh 1-1, J Lyng 1-0, M Murphy 0-3, C O'Sullivan 0-2, J Cummins 0-1.

20 September 2026 Quarter-final	Barrow Rangers	0-15 - 5-25	James Stephens	Clara Grounds
	J Healy 0-7, K O'Neill 0-2, J Kelly 0-2, S McDonald 0-1, B Kelly 0-1, C Purcell 0-1, J Holden 0-1.	Report	L Scanlon 1-7, T O'Dwyer 0-8, E Guilfoyle 2-1, Stephen Manogue 1-0, M McWey 1-0, E McDermott 0-3, O Bateman 0-2, E Lauhoff 0-2, Seán Manogue 0-1, S Deely 0-1.

20 September 2026 Quarter-final	Rower–Inistioge	0-27 - 1-21	St Lachtain's	Gowran Grounds
	E Lyng 0-10, PJ Mackey 0-4, N Spellman 0-3, R Leahy 0-3, J Ryan 0-2, K Murphy 0-2, M Galavan 0-1, J Roche 0-1, E Prendergast 0-1.	Report	C O'Leary 1-10, C Donnelly 0-4, D Maher 0-2, M Donnelly 0-1, B Darcy 0-1, P Killeen 0-1, B Kennedy 0-1, C Dawson 0-1.

=== Semi-finals ===
4 October 2026 Semi-final	Lisdowney	0-23 - 4-20	Rower–Inistioge	UPMC Nowlan Park
	B Kavanagh (0-8, 4fs and 1 ‘65); N Brennan, A McEvoy, A Tallis, C Brennan, D O’Carroll (0-3 each);	Report	E Lyng (2-11, 8fs and 1 ‘65); R Leahy (2-2); J Ryan (0-2); N Spellman, K Murphy, M Galavan, E O’Brien, T O’Callaghan (0-1 each)

4 October 2026 Semi-final	James Stephens	1-18 - 1-07	Tullogher–Rosbercon	UPMC Nowlan Park
	E Guilfoyle (1-5, 1f and 1 ‘65); T O’Dwyer (0-7, 7fs); E McDermott, L Scanlon (0-2 each); W Spencer, C Heffernan (0-1 each)	Report	D O’Connor (1-0); A Murphy (0-2, 1f); W Walsh (0-2, 2fs); D Glennon, M Murphy, C O’Sullivan (0-1 each)

=== Final ===
18 October 2026 Final	Rower–Inistioge	0-16 - 1-16	James Stephens	UPMC Nowlan Park
	E Lyng (0-6, 0-5 frees); J Roche (0-3); J Ryan, K Murphy (0-2 each); N Spellman, T O’Callaghan (0-1 each); P Lyng (0-1, free).	Report	T O’Dwyer (0-6, 0-5 frees); W Spencer (1-0); E McDermott (0-3); C Kenny, E Guilfoyle (0-2 each); E Lauhoff, S Deely, L Scanlon (0-1 each).

== Championship statistics ==
=== Top scorers ===
Rank	Player	Club	Tally	Total	Matches	Average
1	Eoghan Lyng	Rower–Inistioge	2-27	33	3	11.00
2	Cathal O'Leary	St Lachtain's	1-18	21	2	10.50
2	Tadhg O'Dwyer	James Stephens	0-21	21	3	7.00
4	Brian Kavanagh	Lisdowney	1-15	18	2	9.00
5	Eoin Guilfoyle	James Stephens	3-08	17	3	5.66
5	Conor Farrell	Carrickshock	1-14	17	1	17.00
7	Danny Glennon	Tullogher–Rosbercon	2-10	16	3	5.33
7	Killian Carey	Young Irelands	1-13	16	2	8.00
7	Joe Healy	Barrow Rangers	1-13	16	2	8.00
10	Luke Scanlon	James Stephens	1-10	13	3	4.33
10	Andrew Murphy	Tullogher–Rosbercon	0-13	13	3	4.33
