= 2012 Kilkenny Intermediate Hurling Championship =

- Dates: 13 October – 18 November 2012
- Teams: 12
- Sponsor: Michael Lyng Motors
- Champions: Clara (4th title); David Langton (captain)
- Runners-up: St. Patrick's Ballyragget
- Relegated: John Locke's

Tournament statistics
- Matches played: 15
- Goals scored: 32 (2.13 per match)
- Points scored: 386 (25.73 per match)
- Top scorer(s): Kevin Kelly (1-29)

The 2012 Kilkenny Intermediate Hurling Championship was the 48th staging of the Kilkenny Intermediate Hurling Championship since its establishment by the Kilkenny County Board in 1929. The Championship began on 13 October 2012 and ended on 18 November 2012.

On 18 November 2012, Clara won the championship after a 1–07 to 0–04 victory over St. Patrick's Ballyragget in the final at Nowlan Park. It was their fourth title overall and their first title since 2007.

St. Patrick's Ballyragget's Kevin Kelly was the championship's top scorer with 1-29.

== Team changes ==
=== To Championship ===
Promoted from the Kilkenny Junior Hurling Championship

- St Patrick's Ballyragget

Relegated from the Kilkenny Senior Hurling Championship

- Clara

=== From Championship ===
Promoted to the Kilkenny Senior Hurling Championship

- Danesfort

Relegated to the Kilkenny Junior Hurling Championship

- Graignamanagh

== Results ==
=== First round ===
| 13 October 2012 First round | Emeralds | 0-12 - 2-10 | Glenmore | Palmerstown |
| 14:00 | C Martin 0-8, E O'Gorman 0-2, A Fogarty 0-1, I Grant 0-1. | | E Murphy 1-8, E Verecker 1-0, M Phelan 0-1, M Aylward 0-1. | Referee: John Guinan |

| 13 October 2012 First round | Young Irelands | 2-14 - 2-12 | Mullinavat | Páirc na Seamróg |
| 16:00 | S Kehoe 1-3, P Kehoe 0-6, D Carroll 1-1, P Holden 0-2, JJ Lennon 0-1, T Carroll 0-1. | | W O'Dwyer 1-4, M Murphy 1-0, M Malone 0-3, M Mansfield 0-2, T Aylward 0-1, I Duggan 0-1, P Gahan 0-1. | Referee: Sean Cleere |

| 13 October 2012 First round | Conahy Shamrocks | 0-15 - 1-12 | John Locke's | St. John's Park |
| 16:00 | S Brennan 0-9, P Mullan 0-2, G Kavanagh 0-1, P Vickery 0-1, D Buggy 0-1, G Nolan 0-1. | | J McDowell 1-0, S Burke 0-3, J Corcoran 0-3, JP Corcoran 0-2, G Shelly 0-2, S Bergin 0-2. | Referee: Patrick Dunphy |

| 14 October 2012 First round | Tullogher-Rosbercon | 0-15 - 2-14 | Mooncoin | Mullinavat |
| 13:00 | L Barron 0-6, J Barron 0-3, P Hartley 0-2, R Dollard 0-2, M Cotterell 0-1, W Walsh 0-1. | | D Mackey 2-3, D Purcell 0-3, M Grace 0-2, R Wall 0-2, K Kirwan 0-2, C Daly 0-1, J McGrath 0-1. | Referee: D O'Sullivan |

| 20 October 2012 First round replay | Conahy Shamrocks | 2-15 - 1-14 | John Locke's | Palmerstown |
| 12:00 | S Brennan 1-7, G Nolan 0-4, P Mullan 1-0, P Buggy 0-1, M Lawlor 0-1, A Healy 0-1, P Vickery 0-1. | | J Corcoran 1-2, S Bergin 0-5, S Burke 0-2, D McCormack 0-2, M Holohan 0-2, JP Corcoran 0-1. | Referee: E Ryan |

=== Relegation play-off ===
| 27 October 2012 Play-off | Tullogher-Rosbercon | 0-14 - 0-09 | John Locke's | Piltown |
| 14:00 | L Barron 0-7, W Walsh 0-2, E Mullally 0-2, J Barron 0-2, T Cottrell 0-1. | | S Bergin 0-3, G Shelly 0-2, M Holohan 0-1, S Burke 0-1, D McCormack 0-1, J O'Neill 0-1. | Referee: P Whelan |

=== Quarter-finals ===
| 20 October 2012 Quarter-final | St. Patrick's | 1-17 - 1-05 | Mooncoin | Bennettsbridge |
| 14:00 | K Kelly 1-8, C Delaney 0-3, G Brennan 0-2, M Brennan 0-2, K Delaney 0-2. | | T O'Hanlon 1-1, J McGrath 0-2, C Fleming 0-1, D Mackey 0-1. | Referee: S Cleere |

| 20 October 2012 Quarter-final | Rower-Inistioge | 1-16 - 1-12 | Young Irelands | Thomastown |
| 14:00 | P Sheehan 0-8, C Joyce 1-0, K Ryan 0-2, D Lyng 0-2, K Joyce 0-1, S Lyster 0-1, J Lyng 0-1, J Cassin 0-1. | | P Kehoe 0-7, S Kehoe 1-0, P Holden 0-2, JJ Lennon 0-1, C Nolan 0-1, D Carroll 0-1. | Referee: P Neary |

| 20 October 2012 Quarter-final | Clara | 1-10 - 0-13 | Glenmore | Thomastown |
| 15:30 | Lester Ryan 0-6, C Prendergast 1-1, C Bolger 0-1, A Murphy 0-1, Liam Ryan 0-1. | | A Murphy 0-6, E Murphy 0-2, M Phelan 0-2, M Aylward 0-2, C Foran 0-1. | Referee: T Duggan |

| 27 October 2012 Quarter-final Replay | Clara | 2-14 - 1-13 | Glenmore | Thomastown |
| 15:45 | Lester Ryan 1-5, Liam Ryan 1-3, J Nolan 0-2, J Langton 0-1, B O'Shea 0-1, A Murphy 0-1, C Bolger 0-1. | | A Murphy 0-10, M Aylward 1-0, G Aylward 0-2, E Murphy 0-1. | Referee: P Burke |

| 27 October 2013 Quarter-final | St. Lachtain's | 4-16 - 2-11 | Conahy Shamrocks | Ballyragget |
| 14:00 | B Beckett 1-3, E Guinan 0-6, S Farrell 1-2, L Hickey 1-0, P Campion 1-0, P Guinan 0-2, S Donnelly 0-1, L Hickey 0-1, N McGree 0-1, J Fitzpatrick 0-1. | | S Brenann 0-6, M Lawlor 1-2, A Healy 1-0, G Nolan 0-1, J Wallace 0-1, P Buggy 0-1. | Referee: M Flynn |

=== Semi-finals ===
| 3 November 2012 Semi-final | St. Lachtain's | 1-13 - 2-22 | Clara | Nowlan Park |
| 13:15 | E Guinan 0-7, P Guinan 1-0, N McGree 0-2, B Kennedy 0-1, S Donnelly 0-1, L Hickey 0-1, S Farrell 0-1. | | K Hogan 0-8, L Ryan 1-4, C Prendergast 1-0, A Murphy 0-3, C Bolger 0-3, C Phelan 0-2, J Nolan 0-1, J Langton 0-1. | Referee: J Kennedy |

| 3 November 2012 Semi-final | Rower-Inistioge | 0-16 - 0-16 | St. Patrick's | Nowlan Park |
| 14:45 | P Sheehan 0-6, J Cassin 0-3, C Ryan 0-2, K Joyce 0-1, S Lyster 0-1, D Lyng 0-1, C Joyce 0-1, M Grace 0-1. | | K Kelly 0-10, E Bergin 0-2, M Brennan 0-2, G Brennan 0-1, B Staunton 0-1, C Delaney 0-1. | Referee: E Ryan |

| 11 November 2012 Semi-final Replay | Rower-Inistioge | 0-14 - 2-11 | St. Patrick's | Nowlan Park |
| 12:30 | P Sheehan 0-10, C Joyce 0-2, R Galavan 0-2. | | K Kelly 0-7, M Brennan 1-2, Barry Staunton 1-0, G Brennan 0-1, Bill Staunton 0-1. | Referee: J Kennedy |

=== Final ===
| 18 November 2012 Final | Clara | 1-07 - 0-04 | St. Patrick's | Nowlan Park |
| 14:00 | A Murphy 1-0, J Nolan 0-3, K Hogan 0-2, Lester Ryan 0-1, Liam Ryan 0-1. | | K Kelly 0-4. | Referee: R Dowling |

== Championship statistics ==
=== Top scorers ===
Top scorers overall

| Rank | Player | Club | Tally | Total | Matches | Average |
|---|---|---|---|---|---|---|
| 1 | Kevin Kelly | St. Patrick's Ballyragget | 1-29 | 32 | 4 | 8.00 |
| 2 | Shane Brennan | Conahy Shamrocks | 1-22 | 25 | 3 | 8.33 |
| 3 | Paul Sheehan | Rower-Inistioge | 0-24 | 24 | 3 | 8.00 |
| 4 | Alan Murphy | Glenmore | 0-16 | 16 | 2 | 8.00 |
| 5 | Liam Ryan | Clara | 2-09 | 15 | 4 | 3.75 |
| 5 | Lester Ryan | Clara | 1-12 | 15 | 4 | 3.75 |
| 7 | Eoin Murphy | Glenmore | 1-11 | 14 | 3 | 4.66 |
| 8 | Liam Barron | Tullogher-Rosbercon | 0-13 | 13 | 2 | 6.50 |
| 8 | Eoin Guinan | St. Lachtain's | 0-13 | 13 | 2 | 6.50 |
| 8 | Paul Kehoe | Young Irelands | 0-13 | 13 | 2 | 6.50 |

Top scorers in a single game

| Rank | Player | Club | Tally | Total | Opposition |
|---|---|---|---|---|---|
| 1 | Eoin Murphy | Glenmore | 1-08 | 11 | Emeralds |
| 1 | Kevin Kelly | St. Patrick's Ballyragget | 1-08 | 11 | Mooncoin |
| 3 | Shane Brennan | Conahy Shamrocks | 1-07 | 10 | John Locke's |
| 3 | Alan Murphy | Glenmore | 0-10 | 10 | Clara |
| 3 | Kevin Kelly | St. Patrick's Ballyragget | 0-10 | 10 | Rower-Inistioge |
| 3 | Paul Sheehan | Rower-Inistioge | 0-10 | 10 | St. Patrick's Ballyragget |
| 7 | Diarmuid Mackey | Mooncoin | 2-03 | 9 | Tullogher-Rosbercon |
| 7 | Shane Brennan | Conahy Shamrocks | 0-09 | 9 | John Locke's |
| 9 | Lester Ryan | Clara | 1-05 | 8 | Glenmore |
| 9 | Conor Martin | Emeralds | 0-08 | 8 | Glenmore |
| 9 | Paul Sheehan | Rower-Inistioge | 0-08 | 8 | Young Irelands |
| 9 | Keith Hogan | Clara | 0-08 | 8 | St. Lachtain's |
