= 2013 Kilkenny Intermediate Hurling Championship =

- Dates: 14 September – 20 October 2013
- Teams: 12
- Sponsor: Michael Lyng Motors
- Champions: Rower-Inistioge (1st title); Michael Grace (captain); Ger Morrissey (manager)
- Runners-up: Emeralds
- Relegated: Mooncoin

Tournament statistics
- Matches played: 13

The 2013 Kilkenny Intermediate Hurling Championship was the 49th staging of the Kilkenny Intermediate Hurling Championship since its establishment by the Kilkenny County Board in 1929. The Championship began on 14 September 2013 and ended on 20 November 2013.

Rower-Inistioge won their first intermediate title, beating Emeralds 2–13 to 2–11 in the final.

Mooncoin were relegated from the championship following 1–11 to 0–08 defeat to Young Irelands in a replay.

== Results ==
=== First round ===
14 September 2013 First round	Mooncoin	1-14 - 2-18	Tullogher-Rosbercon	Mullinavat
14:00				Referee: Raymond Byrne

14 September 2013 First round	Emeralds	1-14 - 0-14	Young Irelands	Ballyragget
18:00				Referee: John Guinan

14 September 2013 First round	Thomastown	3-13 - 2-15	Glenmore	Ballyhale
18:00				Referee: John Kennedy

14 September 2013 First round	Conahy Shamrocks	1-10 - 1-15	Mullinavat	Bennettsbridge
18:00				Referee: Denis O'Sullivan

=== Relegation play-off ===
5 October 2013 Play-off	Young Irelands	3-05 - 0-14	Mooncoin	Páirc na Seamróg
13:30	P Holden 3-2, D Carroll 1-1, S Kehoe 0-1.		M Grace 0-4, R Wall 0-4, D Mackey 0-2, E Henebry 0-2, D Purcell 0-1, C Fleming 0-1.	Referee: S Cleere

12 October 2013 Play-off Replay	Young Irelands	1-11 - 0-08	Mooncoin	Páirc na Seamróg
14:00	O Carter 1-0, P Holden 0-3, P Kehoe 0-3, D Carroll 0-2, S Kehoe 0-1, T Carroll 0-1, J Dunphy 0-1.		R Wall 0-5, S Crowley 0-1, D Purcell 0-1, M Grace 0-1.	Referee: P Burke

=== Quarter-finals ===
21 September 2013 Quarter-final	St. Patrick's	3-21 - 3-11	Tullogher-Rosbercon	Palmerstown
13:30	J Brennan 2-4, K Kelly 1-7, S Kenny 0-3, M Brennan 0-3, E Bergin 0-2, B Phelan 0-1, G Brennan 0-1.		W Walsh 3-0, C O'Donoghue 0-9, E Cullinane 0-1, P Hartley 0-1.	Referee: S Cleere

21 September 2013 Quarter-final	St. Lachtain's	2-09 - 2-20	Emeralds	Jim Maher Memorial Park
14:00	S Donnelly 1-1, B Beckett 0-4, J Maher 1-0, M McGree 0-1, B Kennedy 0-1, L Hickey 0-1.		A Fogarty 0-9, A Guilfoyle 2-0, F Clohessy 0-3, P Doheny 0-3, B Troy 0-1, C Martin 0-1, B Campion 0-1, P Phelan 0-1, J Kavanagh 0-1.	Referee: P Dunphy

21 September 2013 Quarter-final	Dunnamaggin	1-17 - 0-14	Mullinavat	Páirc na Seamróg
15:30	W Phelan 1-1, K Moore 0-4, A Fitzpatrick 0-3, D Fitzpatrick 0-3, C Hickey 0-3, C Herity 0-2, W Moylan 0-1.		M Murphy 0-3, T Aylward 0-3, M Mansfield 0-3, P Raftice 0-2, D Butler 0-2, J Walsh 0-1.	Referee: J Kennedy

21 September 2013 Quarter-final	Rower-Inistioge	1-20 - 3-08	Thomastown	Páirc na Seamróg
17:15	M Grace 1-7, P Sheehan 0-6, J cassin 0-3, T Murphy 0-2, C Bolger 0-1, S Grace 0-1.		S Waugh 2-0, M Donnelly 0-6, T O'Hanrahan 1-0, D Waugh 0-1, A Burke 0-1.	Referee: M O'Sullivan

=== Semi-finals ===
6 October 2013 Semi-final	St. Patrick's	2-09 - 2-14	Rower-Inistioge	Nowlan Park
14:00	K Kelly 1-5, M Brennan 1-1, J Brennan 0-3.		C Bolger 1-4, M Grace 0-6, D Lyng 1-0, P Tierney 0-2, S Grace 0-1, C Ryan 0-1.	Referee: P Dunphy

6 October 2013 Semi-final	Dunnamaggin	2-10 - 1-18	Emeralds	Nowlan Park
15:30	K Moore 1-3, S O'Neill 1-0, C Hickey 0-2, N Hickey 0-1, D Fitzpatrick 0-1, K Bergin 0-1, C Herity 0-1, W Phelan 0-1.		A Fogarty 1-8, C Martin 0-3, A Guilfoyle 0-2, F Clohessy 0-1, P Phelan 0-1, D Lyng 0-1, B Troy 0-1, J Kavanagh 0-1.	Referee: D Connolly

=== Final ===
20 October 2013 Final	Rower-Inistioge	2-13 - 2-11	Emeralds	Nowlan Park
15:30	c.ryan 1.2, M Grace 0-4, S Grace 1-0, C Bolger 0-3, K Joyce 0-1, R Galavan 0-1, T Murphy 0-1, J Cassin 0-1.		A Fogarty 2-5, J Doheny 0-1, P Phelan 0-1, F Clohessy 0-1, A Guilfoyle 0-1, C Martin 0-1, J Ryan 0-1.	Referee: E Mansfield
