= 1986 Kilkenny Intermediate Hurling Championship =

- Champions: Conahy Shamrocks (4th title); Geoff O'Shea (captain)
- Runners-up: Piltown

The 1986 Kilkenny Intermediate Hurling Championship was the 21st staging of the Kilkenny Intermediate Hurling Championship since its establishment by the Kilkenny County Board in 1929.

The final was played on 19 October 1986 at Nowlan Park in Kilkenny, between Conahy Shamrocks and Piltown, in what was their first ever meeting in the final. Conahy Shamrocks won the match by 1–10 to 1–07 to claim a record-setting fourth championship title overall and a first championship title in nine years.

== Results ==
=== Final ===
19 October 1986 Final	Conahy Shamrocks	1-10 - 1-07	Piltown	Nowlan Park
	J Brennan 1-4, J Feehan 0-3, P Brennan 0-1, M Buggy 0-1, M Brennan 0-1.		G Kenny 1-2, D McCarthy 0-2, JJ Long 0-1, T O'Shea 0-1, J Power 0-1.
