= 2020 Kilkenny Senior Hurling League =

- Dates: 31 July 2020 – 23 August 2020
- Teams: 12
- Sponsor: St. Canice's Credit Union
- Champions: Dicksboro (5th title); Conor Doheny (captain); Mark Dowling (manager)
- Runners-up: O'Loughlin Gaels

Tournament statistics
- Matches played: 20
- Goals scored: 43 (2.15 per match)
- Points scored: 702 (35.1 per match)
- Top scorer(s): Shane Stapleton (1-37)

The 2020 Kilkenny Senior Hurling League was the 27th staging of the Kilkenny Senior Hurling League since its establishment by the Kilkenny County Board in 1992. The league began on 31 July 2020 and ended on 23 August 2020.

Dicksboro were the defending champions.

On 23 August 2020, Dicksboro won the league after beating O'Loughlin Gaels 3-0 in a penalty shoot-out at UPMC Nowlan Park, after the game had ended 1-20 apiece after extra time. It was the first league final to be decided on penalties.

Dicksboro's Shane Stapleton was the league's top scorer with 1-37.

== Results ==
=== Group A ===
==== Table ====
Advance to final Advance to shield final

Team	Matches				Score			Pts
Team	Pld	W	D	L	For	Against	Diff	Pts
O'Loughlin Gaels	3	2	1	0	70	57	13	5
James Stephens	3	2	1	0	63	57	6	5
Bennettsbridge	3	2	0	1	70	62	8	4
Ballyhale Shamrocks	3	1	1	1	73	70	3	3
Tullaroan	3	0	1	2	63	74	-11	1
Danesfort	3	0	0	3	56	75	-19	0

==== Results ====
31 July 2020 Round 1	Bennettsbridge	1-14 - 1-18	O'Loughlin Gaels	John Locke Park
	N Cleere 0-6, L Blanchfield 1-2, C Brennan 0-3, K Blanchfield 0-1, S Morrissey 0-1, J Cleere 0-1.		E O'Shea 0-8, M Bergin 1-1, E Wall 0-4, R Buckley 0-3, C Loy 0-1, D Loughnane 0-1.

31 July 2020 Round 1	Ballyhale Shamrocks	2-18 - 1-21	Tullaroan	UPMC Nowlan Park
	TJ Reid 1-5, E Reid 1-1, C Fennelly 0-2, B Cody 0-2, E Cody 0-2, R Reid 0-2, E Kenneally 0-2, P Mullen 0-1, J Cuddihy 0-1.		S Walsh 0-10, B Gaffney 1-1, M Keoghan 0-4, D Simpson 0-2, M Walsh 0-1, T Dunne 0-1, T Walsh (M) 0-1, J Walton 0-1.

1 August 2020 Round 1	James Stephens	0-19 - 1-14	Danesfort	UPMC Nowlan Park
	N Brassil 0-4, E Guilfoyle 0-3, W Spencer 0-3, J McGrath 0-2, M McWey 0-2, M Drennen 0-2, T Dwyer 0-1, N Mullins 0-1, M Ruth 0-1.		R Hogan 0-10, P Hogan 1-1, P Hickey 0-1, C Phelan 0-1, J Bruton 0-1.

7 August 2020 Round 2	Tullaroan	0-18 - 0-22	James Stephens	John Locke Park
	S Walsh 0-11, D Simpson 0-3, M Walsh 0-2, S Cuddihy 0-1, M Keoghan 0-1.		E Guilfoyle 0-9, C Browne 0-4, C Kenny 0-3, M Ruth 0-2, M Drennan 0-1, J O'Dwyer 0-1, D Walton 0-1, S Manogue 0-1.

7 August 2020 Round 2	O'Loughlin Gaels	2-21 - 0-18	Ballyhale Shamrocks	UPMC Nowlan Park
	E O'Shea 0-9, J Nolan 1-1, C Kelly 1-1, M Bergin 0-4, J Molloy 0-2, P Deegan 0-1, R Buckley 0-1, D Loughnane 0-1, P Butler 0-1.		TJ Reid 0-7, J Cuddihy 0-4, E Cody 0-2, R Reid 0-2, J Holden 0-1, E Shefflin 0-1, D Mullen 0-1.

8 August 2020 Round 2	Danesfort	1-17 - 3-16	Bennettsbridge	UPMC Nowlan Park
	R Hogan 0-11, P Hogan 1-1, P Mullen 0-3, P Hickey 0-2.		J Cleere 2-1, N Cleere 0-7, C Brennan 1-1, D Blanchfield 0-2, L Blanchfield 0-2, D Wafer 0-1, A Cleere 0-1, J Harkin 0-1.

14 August 2020 Round 3	James Stephens	2-16 - 2-16	O'Loughlin Gaels	UPMC Nowlan Park
	E Guilfoyle 1-5, M Drennan 1-1, N Brassil 0-2, L Scanlon 0-2, D Stapleton 0-2, M McWey 0-1, C Kenny 0-1, M Ruth 0-1, C Browne 0-1.		O Wall 1-4, E O'Shea 0-4, P Deegan 1-0, P Butler 0-3, L Hogan 0-2, M Bergin 0-2, J Leahy 0-1.

15 August 2020 Round 3	Bennettsbridge	2-22 - 1-18	Tullaroan	Páirc Lachtain
	N Cleere 0-9, C Brennan 1-5, L Blanchfield 1-3, E Morrissey 0-1, A Cleere 0-1, K Blanchfield 0-1, H O'Neill 0-1, J Larkin 0-1.		S Walsh 0-10, M Keoghan 1-4, P Walsh 0-1, J Walton 0-1, B Gaffney 0-1, K Coogan 0-1.

15 August 2020 Round 3	Ballyhale Shamrocks	3-22 -1-16	Danesfort	John Locke Park
	TJ Reid 1-8, E Cody 1-3, C Fennelly 1-1, E Reid 0-3, J Cuddihy 0-2, R Reid 0-2, R Corcoran 0-1, P Mullen 0-1, D Corcoran 0-1.		R Hogan 0-14, D Dunphy Wallace 1-0, P Mullen 0-1, R Walsh 0-1.

=== Group B ===
==== Table ====
Advance to final Advance to shield final

Team	Matches				Score			Pts
Team	Pld	W	D	L	For	Against	Diff	Pts
Dicksboro	3	3	0	0	74	40	34	6
Clara	3	2	0	1	71	63	8	4
Mullinavat	3	1	2	0	56	51	5	4
Erin's Own	3	1	1	1	60	63	-3	3
Rower-Inistioge	3	0	1	2	52	72	-20	1
Graigue-Ballycallan	3	0	0	3	42	66	-24	0

==== Results ====
31 July 2020 Round 1	Graigue-Ballycallan	0-16 - 1-21	Clara	Páirc Lachtain
	S Ryan 0-10, J Roberts 0-4, C Prendeville 0-1, C Hoyne 0-1.		J Bergin 0-7, C Bolger 1-2, J Kehoe 0-4, M Kenny 0-2, D Langton 0-1, M O'Connell 0-1, C O'Shea 0-1, L Ryan 0-1, J Langton 0-1,

1 August 2020 Round 1	Erin's Own	0-20 - 1-17	Mullinavat	UPMC Nowlan Park
	M Murphy 0-8, J Holohan 0-4, M Boran 0-3, J Buggy 0-2, S Feehan 0-1, N McMahon 0-1, C Fogarty 0-1.		J Walsh 0-10, G Malone 1-0, O Knox 0-2, P Dempsey 0-1, W O'Dwyer 0-1, L Fennelly 0-1, J Gahan 0-1, B Phelan 0-1.

1 August 2020 Round 1	Rower-Inistioge	0-12 - 2-16	Dicksboro	Bennettsbridge Sportsfield
	D Kelly 0-9, K Murphy 0-2, M Galavan 0-1, J Ryan 0-1.		S Stapleton 0-10, A Nolan 1-1, C Kavanagh 1-0, B Sheehan 0-2, M Nolan 0-2, E Fennelly 0-1.

6 August 2020 Round 2	Clara	1-12 - 3-16	Erin's Own	UPMC Nowlan Park
	J Bergin 1-5, C O'Shea 0-1, M Kenny 0-1, J Kehoe 0-1, L Ryan 0-1, C Bolger 0-1, M O'Connell 0-1, P Cody 0-1.		M Murphy 1-11, J Holohan 1-2, J Buggy 1-1, J Mullins 0-1, D Brennan 0-1.

7 August 2020 Round 2	Dicksboro	0-24 - 0-13	Graigue-Ballycallan	Páirc Lachtain
	S Stapleton 0-10, M Nolan 0-3, B Sheehan 0-2, A Nolan 0-2, L Moore 0-2, A Gaffney 0-1, O Walsh 0-1, O Gough 0-1, C Kavanagh 0-1, E Fennelly 0-1.		S Ryan 0-11, A Brennan 0-1, T Ronan 0-1.

7 August 2020 Round 2	Mullinavat	1-15 - 0-18	Rower-Inistioge	Thomastown Sportsfield
	J Walsh 1-3, W O'Dwyer 0-3, G Malone 0-3, T Aylward 0-1, O Knox 0-1, B Phelan 0-1, M Mansfield 0-1, P Gahan 0-1, M Malone 0-1.		D Kelly 0-13, P Lyng 0-3, J Ryan 0-1, K Murphy 0-1.

15 August 2020 Round 3	Erin's Own	1-12 - 3-19	Dicksboro	UPMC Nowlan Park
	M Murphy 1-8, J Buggy 0-2, C Fogarty 0-1, S Feehan 0-1.		S Stapleton 1-8, L Moore 1-1, B Sheehan 0-4, A Nolan 1-0, O Walsh 0-1, M Fagan 0-1, T Kenny 0-1, D Holohan 0-1, M Nolan 0-1, C Kavanagh 0-1.

15 August 2020 Round 3	Rower-Inistioge	2-16 - 3-23	Clara	Thomastown Sportsfield
	D Kelly 0-8, T Murphy 1-0, R Galavan 1-0, P Lyng 0-2, M Galavan 0-2, J Logue 0-1, J Ryan 0-1, C Ryan 0-1, T Doyle 0-1.		Liam Ryan 1-4, J Byrne 0-5, M O'Connell 1-1, D Langton 0-4, J Nolan 1-0, Lester Ryan 0-3, C Bolger 0-2, M Kenny 0-1, J Langton 0-1, J Kehoe 0-1.

15 August 2020 Round 3	Graigue-Ballycallan	0-13 - 0-18	Mullinavat	UPMC Nowlan Park
	S Ryan 0-5, J Roberts 0-3, A Brennan 0-2, T Dunphy 0-1, K Egan 0-1, C Prendeville 0-1.		J Walsh 0-4, O Knox 0-3, A Mansfield 0-3, M Mansfield 0-2, W O'Dwyer 0-1, L Fennelly 0-1, I Duggan 0-1, G Malone 0-1, M Malone 0-1, C Walsh 0-1.

=== Knockout stage ===
==== Shield final ====
23 August 2020 Shield final	James Stephens	0-12 - 1-22	Clara	Bennettsbridge Sportsfield
	E Guilfoyle (0-6, 0-5 frees); M Drennan, D Walton, J McGrath, W Spencer, C Browne, D Stapleton (0-1 each).		C Bolger (0-8); P Cody (1-1); J Byrne (0-3, frees); L Ryan (0-3); C O’Shea, M O’Connell (0-2 each); J Kehoe, J Langton, P Nolan (0-1 each).

==== Final ====
23 August 2020 Final	O'Loughlin Gaels	1-20 - 1-20; Penalties: 0-3	Dicksboro	UPMC Nowlan Park
	M Bergin 0-8 (5f); D Burke 1-0; S Murphy (2f), E O’Shea (f), L Hogan, C Heary 0-2 each; C Loy, P Deegan, P Butler, M Butler 0-1 each.	Report	S Stapleton 0-9 (6f, 0-1 pen, 1 ’65); A Nolan 1-5; B Sheehan 0-3; O Gough, L Moore, J Sheehan 0-1 each.

== League statistics ==
=== Top scorers ===
Overall

Rank	Player	Club	Tally	Total	Matches	Average
1	Shane Stapleton	Dicksboro	1-37	40	4	10.00
2	Richie Hogan	Danesfort	0-35	35	3	11.66
3	Michael Murphy	Erin's Own	2-27	33	3	11.00
4	Shane Walsh	Tullaroan	0-31	31	3	10.33
5	David Kelly	Rower-Inistioge	0-30	30	3	10.00
6	T. J. Reid	Ballyhale Shamrocks	2-20	26	3	8.66
6	Eoin Guilfoyle	James Stephens	1-23	26	4	6.50
6	Seán Ryan	Graigue-Ballycallan	0-26	26	3	8.66
7	Eoin O'Shea	O'Loughlin Gaels	0-23	23	4	5.75
8	Nicky Cleere	Bennettsbridge	0-22	22	3	7.33

In a single game

Rank	Player	Club	Tally	Total	Opposition
1	Michael Murphy	Erin's Own	1-11	14	Clara
1	Richie Hogan	Danesfort	0-14	14	Ballyhale Shamrocks
2	David Kelly	Rower-Inistioge	0-13	13	Mullinavat
3	T. J. Reid	Ballyhale Shamrocks	1-08	11	Danesfort
3	Michael Murphy	Erin's Own	1-08	11	Dicksboro
3	Shane Stapleton	Dicksboro	1-08	11	Erin's Own
3	Shane Walsh	Tullaroan	0-11	11	James Stephens
3	Richie Hogan	Danesfort	0-11	11	Bennettsbridge
3	Seán Ryan	Graigue-Ballycallan	0-11	11	Dicksboro
4	Shane Walsh	Tullaroan	0-10	10	Ballyhale Shamrocks
4	Richie Hogan	Danesfort	0-10	10	James Stephens
4	Seán Ryan	Graigue-Ballycallan	0-10	10	Clara
4	John Walsh	Mullinavat	0-10	10	Erin's Own
4	Shane Stapleton	Dicksboro	0-10	10	Rower-Inistioge
4	Shane Stapleton	Dicksboro	0-10	10	Graigue-Ballycallan
4	Shane Walsh	Tullaroan	0-10	10	Bennettsbridge
