= 2022 Kilkenny Intermediate Hurling Championship =

- Dates: 17 September – 23 October 2022
- Teams: 12
- Sponsor: Michael Lyng Motors Hyundai
- Champions: Danesfort (3rd title); Des Dunne (captain); Niall Bergin (manager)
- Runners-up: Thomastown; Jonjo Farrell (captain)
- Relegated: St. Lachtain's

Tournament statistics
- Matches played: 12
- Goals scored: 34 (2.83 per match)
- Points scored: 401 (33.42 per match)
- Top scorer(s): Richie Hogan (0-33)

The 2022 Kilkenny Intermediate Hurling Championship was the 58th staging of the Kilkenny Intermediate Hurling Championship since its establishment by the Kilkenny County Board in 1929. The championship ran from 17 September 2022 to 23 October 2022.

The final was played on 23 October 2022 at UPMC Nowlan Park in Kilkenny, between Danesfort and Thomastown, in what was their first ever meeting in the final. Danesfort won the match by 1–36 to 4–25 to claim their third championship title overall and a first title in 11 years.

Danesfort's Richie Hogan was the championship's top scorer with 0-33.

== Team changes ==
=== To Championship ===
Promoted from the Kilkenny Junior Hurling Championship

- Mooncoin

Relegated from the Kilkenny Senior Hurling Championship

- Rower-Inistioge

=== From Championship ===
Promoted to the Kilkenny Senior Hurling Championship

- Glenmore

Relegated to the Kilkenny Junior Hurling Championship

- John Locke's

== Results ==
=== First round ===
17 September 2022 First round	Young Irelands	4-20 - 5-20	Mooncoin	Rower-Iistioge Grounds
	T Phelan 1-6, P Holden 2-1, S Carey 1-2, J Brennan 0-5, T Drea 0-2, S Farrell 0-1, M Carey 0-1, J Lennon 0-1.		C Quilty 2-5, P Walsh 0-8, S Gannon 1-3, A Croke 1-1, P Henebry 1-0, M O'Neill 0-2, J Fitzgerald 0-1.

17 September 2022 First round	St. Martin's	1-17 - 1-13	St. Lachtain's	Canon Kearns Park
	J Mulhall 1-2, S Kinsella 0-4, B Cody 0-4, J Manning 0-3, D Comerford 0-1, D Walsh 0-1, J Maher 0-1, D Shore 0-1,.		C O'Leary 0-6, B Kennedy 1-1, P Killeen 0-3, N McGee 0-2, S Rafter 0-1.

17 September 2022 First round	Fenians	1-11 - 2-15	Conahy Shamrocks	Lisdowney Grounds
	M Webster 0-8, D Tobin 1-1, N Carroll 0-1, M Carroll 0-1.		J Bergin 0-11, T Phelan 1-0, D Cuddihy 1-0, E Delaney 0-1, E Cahill 0-1, T Rice 0-1, M Gunner 0-1.

18 September 2022 First round	O'Loughlin Gaels	1-11 - 3-16	Dunnamaggin	Danesfort Grounds
	S Bolger 0-6, G Kelly 1-0, A Sheridan 0-2, O Murphy 0-2, R Poyntz 0-1.		D Fitzpatrick 2-3, E Kearney 0-7, R Cody 1-0, D Walsh 0-3, A Hickey 0-2, P Kenneally 0-1.

=== Relegation playoff ===
1 October 2022 Playoff	Fenians	1-16 - 0-12	St. Lachtain's	St. John's Park
	M Webster 0-10, C Tobin 1-2, M Carroll 0-2, E Phelan 0-1, D Tobin 0-1.		L Hickey 0-6, B Kennedy 0-2, C O'Leary 0-2, N McGree 0-1, J Fitzpatrick 0-1.

=== Quarter-finals ===
1 October 2022 Quarter-final	Danesfort	1-22 - 0-17	Conahy Shamrocks	St. John's Park
	R Hogan 0-11, J Cullen 1-1, P Cooney 0-2, E Brennan 0-1, J Bruton 0-1, B Whitty 0-1, P Hickey 0-1, C Phelan 0-1, C Kearney 0-1, D Dunne 0-1, D O'Neill 0-1.		E Delaney 0-6, J Bergin 0-5, T Rice 0-2, T Phelan 0-2, K Mooney 0-1, D Brennan 0-1.

1 October 2022 Quarter-final	Thomastown	1-30 - 0-16	St. Martin's	Gowran Grounds
	R Donnelly 0-9, JJ Farrell 1-1, J Donnelly 0-4, S Donnelly 0-3, D Waugh 0-3, A Burke 0-2, L Connellan 0-2, J Holden 0-2, E Donnelly 0-1, P McDonald 0-1, J Barron 0-1, B Staunton 0-1.		S Kinsella 0-8, D Shore 0-3, B Coady 0-2, J Mulhall 0-1, J Maher 0-1, D Walsh 0-1.

1 October 2022 Quarter-final	Rower-Inistioge	1-17 - 1-11	Mooncoin	Páirc na Seamróg
	R Leahy 0-11, E O'Brien 1-0, T Doyle 0-2, J Ryan 0-1, D Joyce 0-1, G Murphy 0-1, M Galavan 0-1.		P Walsh 0-5, P Henebery 1-0, A Croke 0-2, K Hogan 0-2, J Fitzgerald 0-1, C Quilty 0-1.

1 October 2022 Quarter-final	Carrickshock	2-15 - 1-10	Dunnamaggin	Piltown Grounds
	E O'Neill 2-6, J O'Dwyer 0-2, M Rice 0-2, D Brennan 0-2, B Donovan 0-2, J Power 0-1.		M Cody 1-0, E Kearney 0-3, R Cody 0-2, J Fitzpatrick 0-1, K Bergin 0-1, A Hickey 0-1, D Walsh 0-1, P Kenneally 0-1.

=== Semi-finals ===
9 October 2022 Semi-final	Danesfort	1-15 - 0-12	Rower-Inistioge	UPMC Nowlan Park
	R Hogan (0-10, 0-9 frees); J Cullen (1-0); C Phelan (0-2); R Walsh, J Bruton (0-1 each); P Hogan (0-1 free).	Report	R Leahy (0-9, 0-6 frees, 0-1 line-ball); T Doyle (0-3).

9 October 2022 Semi-final	Thomastown	1-14 - 1-10	Carrickshock	UPMC Nowlan Park
	R Donnelly (0-9, 0-7 frees), J Donnelly (0-4), J Holden (1-0), B Staunton (0-1).	Report	E O’Neill (1-9, 0-7 frees), J O’Dwyer (0-1).

=== Final ===
23 October 2022 Final	Danesfort	1-36 - 4-25 (aet)	Thomastown	UPMC Nowlan Park
	R Hogan (0-12, six frees), J Bruton (0-6), J Cullen (1-1), J Mullally (0-4), B Whitty, C Phelan (0-3 each), D O'Neill, C Kearney (0-2 each), P Murphy, P Cooney, R Walsh (0-1 each)	Report	R Donnelly (1-9, six frees), J Holden (2-1), JJ Farrell (1-1), J Donnelly, S Donnelly (0-4 each), L Connellan (0-2), P McDonald, E Donnelly, Z Bay Hammond, T O'Hanrahan (0-1 each).	Referee: M O'Sullivan (Ballyhale Shamrocks)

== Championship statistics ==
=== Top scorers ===
Overall

Rank	Player	Club	Tally	Total	Matches	Average
1	Richie Hogan	Danesfort	0-33	33	3	11.00
2	Robbie Donnelly	Thomastown	1-27	30	3	10.00
3	Eoghan O'Neill	Carrickshock	3-15	24	2	12.00
4	Richie Leahy	Rower-Inistioge	0-20	20	2	10.00
5	Mark Webster	Fenians	0-18	18	2	9.00
6	James Bergin	Conahy Shamrocks	0-16	16	2	8.00
7	Patrick Walsh	Mooncoin	0-13	13	2	6.50
8	Jack Holden	Thomastown	3-03	12	3	4.00
8	Ciarán Quilty	Mooncoin	2-06	12	2	6.00
8	Shane Kinsella	St. Martin's	0-12	12	2	6.00
8	John Donnelly	Thomastown	0-12	12	3	4.00

In a single game

Rank	Player	Club	Tally	Total	Opposition
1	Eoghan O'Neill	Carrickshock	2-06	12	Dunnamaggin
1	Robbie Donnelly	Thomastown	1-09	12	Danesfort
1	Eoghan O'Neill	Carrickshock	1-09	12	Thomastown
1	Richie Hogan	Danesfort	0-12	12	Thomastown
5	Ciarán Quilty	Mooncoin	2-05	11	Young Irelands
5	James Bergin	Conahy Shamrocks	0-11	11	Fenians
5	Richie Leahy	Rower-Inistioge	0-11	11	Mooncoin
5	Richie Hogan	Danesfort	0-11	11	Conahy Shamrocks
9	Mark Webster	Fenians	0-10	10	St. Lachtains
9	Richie Hogan	Danesfort	0-10	10	Rower-Inistioge
