= 2015 Kilkenny Intermediate Hurling Championship =

- Dates: 19 September 2015 – 24 October 2015
- Teams: 12
- Sponsor: Michael Lyng Motors
- Champions: Bennettsbridge (1st title)
- Runners-up: St. Patricks
- Relegated: Emeralds

Tournament statistics
- Matches played: 13

The 2015 Kilkenny Intermediate Hurling Championship was the 51st staging of the Kilkenny Intermediate Hurling Championship since its establishment by the Kilkenny County Board in 1929. The Championship began on 19 September 2015 and ended on 24 October 2015.

Bennettsbridge won their first intermediate title, beating St. Patrick's 1–16 to 1–14 in a replay.

Emeralds were relegated from the championship following 0–19 to 0–15 defeat to Dunnamaggin.

== Results ==
=== First round ===
19 September 2015 First round	Emeralds	0-15 - 2-17	Tullogher-Rosbercon	Danesfort
14:00				Referee: John Walsh

19 September 2015 First round	Lisdowney	4-8 - 1-15	Conahy Shamrocks	Canon Kearns Park
16:00				Referee: Peter Burke

19 September 2015 First round	Thomastown	2-18 - 0-22	Dunnamaggin	Ballyhale
17:50				Referee: John Kennedy

20 September 2015 First round	St. Patrick's	0-16 - 1-8	Graigue-Ballycallan	Palmerstown
12:00				Referee: Richard Dowling

=== Relegation play-off ===
10 October 2015 Play-off	Emeralds	0-15- 0-19	Dunnamaggin	St. John's Park
16:00				Referee: Sean Cleere

=== Quarter-finals ===
26 September 2015 Quarter-final	Young Irelands	0-10 - 1-18	St. Patrick's	St. John's Park
14:00				Referee: Eugene Ryan

26 September 2015 Quarter-final	Bennettsbridge	2-16 - 2-10	Tullogher-Rosbercon	Ballyhale
16:30				Referee: Michael O'Sullivan

27 September 2015 Quarter-final	Tullaroan	1-8 - 1-14	Thomastown	John Locke Park
14:00				Referee: Richard Dowling

27 September 2015 Quarter-final	St. Lachtain's	2-15 - 1-12	Lisdowney	Ballyragget
16:30				Referee: Eamon Mansfield

=== Semi-finals ===
4 October 2015 Semi-final	Bennettsbridge	3-18 - 2-14	St. Lachtain's	Nowlan Park
14:00				Referee: John Kennedy

4 October 2015 Semi-final	Thomastown	2-13 - 2-23	St. Patrick's	Nowlan Park
15:30				Referee: Sean Cleere

=== Final ===
18 October 2015 Final	Bennettsbridge	0-20 - 3-11	St. Patrick's	Nowlan Park
16:15				Referee: Gavin Quilty

24 October 2015 Final Replay	Bennettsbridge	1-16 - 1-14	St. Patrick's	Nowlan Park
15:00				Referee: Richard Dowling
