= 1995 Kilkenny Intermediate Hurling Championship =

- Teams: 12
- Sponsor: Vale Oil
- Champions: Dunnamaggin (1st title); Eamon Kennedy (captain)
- Runners-up: Bennettsbridge

The 1995 Kilkenny Intermediate Hurling Championship was the 31st staging of the Kilkenny Intermediate Hurling Championship since its establishment by the Kilkenny County Board in 1929.

The final was played on 8 October 1995 at Nowlan Park in Kilkenny, between Dunnamaggin and Bennettsbridge, in what was their first ever meeting in the final. Dunnamaggin won the match by 2–21 to 1–09 to claim their first ever championship title.

== Results ==
=== Final ===
8 October 1995 Final	Dunnamaggin	2-21 - 1-09	Bennettsbridge	Nowlan Park
	S Ryan 0-7, M O'Shea 1-2, R Cahill 1-2, P Kearney 0-3, M Moran 0-3, E Kennedy 0-2, D Lahart 0-1, M O'Neill 0-1.		R Moran 0-6, J Lennon 1-0, J Drea 0-2, J McGarry 0-1.
