= 1930 Kilkenny Intermediate Hurling Championship =

- Dates: 12 April 1931
- Teams: 2
- Champions: Conahy Shamrocks (1st title)
- Runners-up: Mooncoin

Tournament statistics
- Matches played: 1
- Goals scored: 7 (7 per match)
- Points scored: 2 (2 per match)

The 1930 Kilkenny Intermediate Hurling Championship was the second staging of the Kilkenny Intermediate Hurling Championship since its establishment by the Kilkenny County Board in 1929. The championship consisted of just one game between the two divisional championship winners.

The final was played on 12 April 1931 at Nowlan Park in Kilkenny, between Conahy Shamrocks and Mooncoin, in what was their first meeting in a final. Conahy Shamrocks won the match by 6–01 to 1–01 to claim their first championship title.

== Qualification ==
Championship	Champions
North Kilkenny Intermediate Hurling Championship	Conahy Shamrocks
South Kilkenny Intermediate Hurling Championship	Mooncoin

== Results ==
=== Final ===
12 April 1931 Final	Conahy Shamrocks	6-01 - 1-01	Mooncoin	Nowlan Park
