= 2006 Kilkenny Intermediate Hurling Championship =

- Teams: 12
- Champions: Mullinavat (2nd title)
- Runners-up: Clara

The 2006 Kilkenny Intermediate Hurling Championship was the 42nd staging of the Kilkenny Intermediate Hurling Championship since its establishment by the Kilkenny County Board in 1929.

The final was played on 5 November 2006 at Nowlan Park in Kilkenny, between Mullinavat and Clara. Mullinavat won the match by 1–21 to 2–11 to claim their third championship title overall and a first championship title in five years.

== Results ==
=== Final ===
5 November 2006 Final	Mullinavat	1-21 - 2-11	Clara	Nowlan Park
