= 1931 Kilkenny Intermediate Hurling Championship =

- Dates: 13 March 1932
- Teams: 2
- Champions: Danesfort (1st title)
- Runners-up: Slieverue

Tournament statistics
- Matches played: 1
- Goals scored: 8 (8 per match)
- Points scored: 7 (7 per match)

The 1931 Kilkenny Intermediate Hurling Championship was the third staging of the Kilkenny Intermediate Hurling Championship since its establishment by the Kilkenny County Board in 1929. The championship consisted of just one game between the two divisional championship winners.

The final was played on 13 March 1932 at Nowlan Park in Kilkenny, between Danesfort and Slieverue, in what was their first meeting in a final. Danesfort won the match by 4-06 to 4-01 to claim their first championship title.

== Qualification ==
Championship	Champions
North Kilkenny Intermediate Hurling Championship	Danesfort
South Kilkenny Intermediate Hurling Championship	Slieverue

== Results ==
=== Final ===
13 March 1932 Final	Danesfort	4-06 - 4-01	Slieverue	Nowlan Park
