= Cian Kenny =

Irish hurler

Personal information
- Native name: Cian Ó Cionnaith (Irish)
- Born: 26 May 2001 (age 25) Kilkenny, Ireland
- Occupation: Student
- Height: 5 ft 10 in (178 cm)

Sport
- Sport: Hurling
- Position: Midfield
Club
- Years: Club
- James Stephens
Club titles
- Kilkenny titles: 0
College
- Years: College
- Institute of Technology, Carlow
College titles
- Fitzgibbon titles: 0
Inter-county*
| Years | County | Apps (scores) |
| 2022-present | Kilkenny | 0 (0-00) |
Inter-county titles
- Leinster titles: 4
- All-Irelands: 0
- NHL: 0
- All Stars: 0
- *Inter County team apps and scores correct as of 21:41, 13 February 2022.

Cian Kenny (born 26 May 2001) is an Irish hurler who plays for intermediate club side James Stephens and at inter-county level with the Kilkenny senior hurling team. He usually lines out at midfield.

== Career ==
Kenny first played at juvenile and underage levels with the James Stephens club before progressing onto the senior team. As a schoolboy with St. Kieran's College, he won an All-Ireland Colleges Championship title in 2019. Kenny first appeared at inter-county level as a member of the Kilkenny minor hurling team that lost the 2018 All-Ireland minor final to Galway. He progressed onto the under-20 team before being drafted onto the Kilkenny senior hurling team for the 2022 National League.

== Career statistics ==
As of match played 13 February 2022.

| Team | Year | National League | | | Leinster | | All-Ireland | | Total | |
| Team | Year | Division | Apps | Score | Apps | Score | Apps | Score | Apps | Score |
|---|---|---|---|---|---|---|---|---|---|---|
| Kilkenny | 2022 | Division 1B | 1 | 0-01 | 0 | 0-00 | 0 | 0-00 | 1 | 0-01 |
| Career total | | | 1 | 0-01 | 0 | 0-00 | 0 | 0-00 | 1 | 0-01 |

== Honours ==
St. Kieran's College

- All-Ireland Colleges Senior Hurling Championship: 2019
- Leinster Colleges Senior Hurling Championship: 2019

Kilkenny

- Leinster Senior Hurling Championship: 2022, 2023, 2024, 2025
- Leinster Minor Hurling Championship: 2018

James Stephens

- Kilkenny Intermediate Hurling Championship: 2026
