= Richie Hogan =

Kilkenny hurler

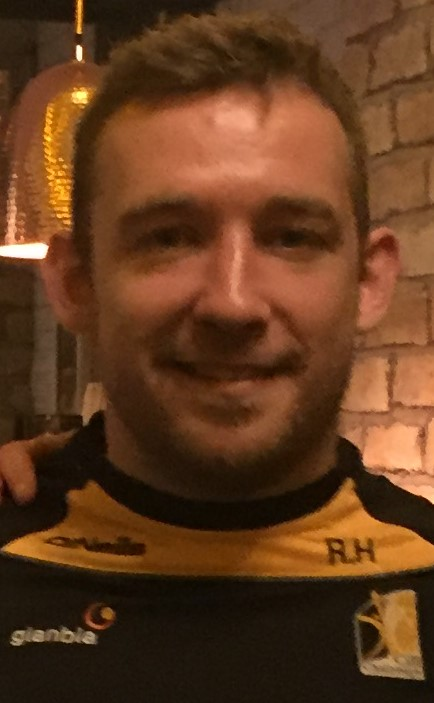

Personal information
- Native name: Risteard Ó hÓgáin (Irish)
- Born: 8 August 1988 (age 38) Kilkenny, Ireland
- Occupation: Management Consultant
- Height: 5 ft 8 in (173 cm)

Sport
- Sport: Hurling
- Position: Midfield
Club
- Years: Club
- Danesfort
Club titles
- Kilkenny titles: 0
Colleges
- Years: College
- 2006–2009; 2013-2014; 2021-2023: St Patrick's College; Dublin City University; Trinity College Dublin
College titles
- Fitzgibbon titles: 0
Inter-county*
| Years | County | Apps (scores) |
| 2007–2023 | Kilkenny | 58 (12–95) |
Inter-county titles
- Leinster titles: 12
- All-Irelands: 7
- NHL: 5
- All Stars: 4
- *Inter County team apps and scores correct as of 17:16, 06 November 2025.

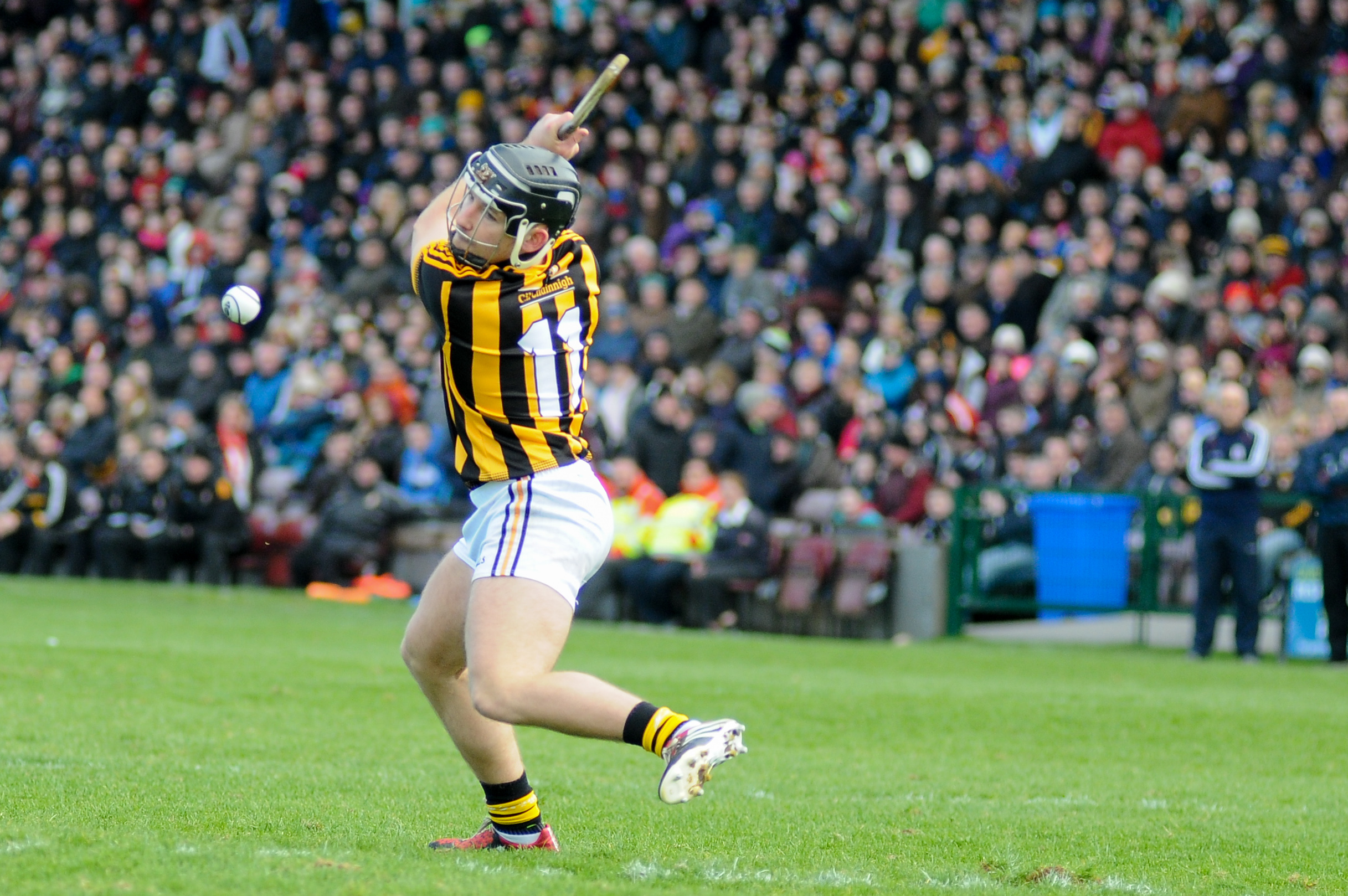
Hogan in action for Kilkenny against Galway at Pearse Stadium in the 2015 National Hurling League

Richard (Richie) Hogan (born 8 August 1988) is an Irish hurler who played as a midfielder and centre forward for the Kilkenny hurling team from 2007 until 2023 and is widely considered one of the greatest players of his generation.

Known for his exceptional skill, scoring ability and creative play Hogan played a central part of the Kilkenny team that are widely considered the greatest hurling team of all time during the Brian Cody era. Hogan won 7 All Irelands between 2007 and 2015 and was voted GAA Hurler of the Year in 2014 by his peers making him one of the most successful players to have ever played the game. Hogan played in 12 Senior All Ireland Finals during his time with Kilkenny.

He has also won 13 Leinster Hurling Championships, 5 GAA National Hurling Leagues and 2 U21 All Ireland Hurling Championships with Kilkenny and 2 All Ireland Colleges titles with St Kieran's College. At club level Hogan won a county Junior medal in 2006, County Intermediate medals in 2011 and 2023 and an All Ireland Junior medal in 2007 with his club Danesfort.

Hogan was also a successful handball player winning several All Ireland Handball Championships at underage level as well as winning the World U15 Singles Handball Championship in 2003.

Hogan's brother Paddy was also a member of the Kilkenny senior team and won All Ireland Medals in 2011 and 2012 as well as multiple Leinster and National League medals.

== Early life ==
Born in Kilkenny in 1988, Hogan is a native of Danesfort, County Kilkenny. Hogan gained local attention from birth due to the uniqueness of his date of birth 8/8/88 and his weight of 8lbs and 8oz. He went to primary school in the neighbouring village of Bennettsbridge with whom he played at school and club level until he was 12 years old. Hogan then attended secondary school in the famous hurling nursery of St Kieran's College.

Hogan first came to prominence in the early 2000s playing alongside his brother Paddy for Danesfort where they won numerous Kilkenny county championships at juvenile level and with his school St Kieran's where he won Leinster and All Ireland titles at Juvenile, Junior and Senior level.

== Kilkenny playing career ==
=== Minor ===
Hogan was an underage star in Kilkenny hurling who first came to prominence on the inter-county scene as a member of the Kilkenny minor team in 2004 at just 15 years old where he scored 1–02 against Offaly on his debut in the Leinster Minor semi-final. He won his first Leinster medal that year following a heavy 1–15 to 1–4 defeat of Dublin. He received the Man of the Match Award in the All Ireland semi final win over a fancied Tipperary side scoring 0-04. The subsequent All-Ireland decider pitted Kilkenny against Galway. Hogan proved to be the hero for Kilkenny, as his point, a minute into injury time, earned "the Cats" a 1–18 to 3–12 draw. The replay a week later was also a close affair, with Galway just about holding off the Kilkenny challenge to win by 0–16 to 1–12.

After surrendering their provincial title in 2005, Kilkenny bounced back the following year to regain their Leinster title with 4–22 to 1–5 defeat of Carlow gave Hogan a second Leinster medal. Hogan's tally of 2–10 in the final was a record score by an individual in a Leinster minor final. Kilkenny were subsequently defeated in the All Ireland semi final by a point against Tipperary leaving Hogan with no All Ireland minor medal at the end of a 3-year career. Hogan finished the year as the championship's top scorer with 5–38 in 5 games.

=== Under 21 ===
==== 2006 ====
Hogan's performances at minor level in 2006 saw him being added to the under-21 panel for the All-Ireland decider against Tipperary and Intermediate panel for the All-Ireland decider against Cork in the same year. Hogan came on as a substitute in the 40th minute of the All U21 final immediately scoring a point. A last second opportunist goal by Hogan saved Kilkenny and secured a 2–14 apiece draw. Hogan started at full forward in the replay in Thurles which was another close encounter, however, Paddy Hogan's first half goal helped Kilkenny claw their way to the title following a 1–11 to 0–11 defeat of Tipperary. It was Hogan's first All-Ireland medal for Kilkenny.

==== 2008 ====
After surrendering their provincial and All-Ireland crowns in 2007, Hogan collected his first Leinster medal in 2008 following a facile 2–21 to 2–9 defeat of Offaly. Hogan won Man of the Match Award scoring 2–05 in the All Ireland semi final against All Ireland favourites Galway. Old rivals Tipperary provided the opposition in the All-Ireland decider. Tipp whittled down a six-point half-time deficit to just two with minutes to go, however, Kilkenny hung on to win by 2–13 to 0–15 securing the Grand Slam of championship titles. Hogan finished the season as the championship's top scorer with 3–27 in 4 games.

==== 2009 ====
Hogan collected a second successive Leinster medal in 2009, as a brace of Jonjo Farrell goals helped Kilkenny to a 2–20 to 1–19 defeat of Dublin. Clare later faced Kilkenny in their first ever All-Ireland decider. Hogan won had played in the Senior All Ireland Final a week earlier scored 0-06 points in his 4th All Ireland U21 final. A late point from midfielder Cormac O'Donovan gave Clare a narrow 0–15 to 0–14 victory. Hogan finished as the championship's second top scorer with 0–30 in 4 games, behind Clare's Colin Ryan.

=== Intermediate ===
In 2006, following Kilkenny's exit from the minor championship, Hogan was a late addition to the Kilkenny Intermediate team. He came on as a substitute in the 2006 All-Ireland final against Cork. Despite scoring goal he ended up on the losing side on a 3–15 to 1–19 loss after extra-time.

He was also a member of the team in 2007 but lost out to Wexford in the Leinster Intermediate Hurling Championship final.

=== Senior ===
==== Beginnings 2007 - 2008 ====
Hogan was just out of the minor grade when he was added to the Kilkenny senior panel in 2007. That year he shared in his county's Leinster and All-Ireland triumphs, however, Hogan was yet to make his debut.

Hogan made his debut for Kilkenny in Round 1 of the National Hurling League against Dublin, scoring 1-02 and finished campaign as Kilkenny's top scorer with 1–16. On 15 June 2008 Hogan made his senior championship debut in a 2–24 to 0–12 Leinster semi-final defeat of Offaly. Despite Kilkenny's win it proved to be a difficult day for Hogan and was subsequently his only championship outing that year, however, he collected another set of Leinster and All-Ireland medals as a non-playing substitute.

==== Established player 2009 - 2011 ====
Hogan collected a first National League medal in 2009, as Kilkenny beat Tipperary by 2–26 to 4–17 with a thrilling extra-time victory. He finished the game with 1–10 and the man of the match accolade, however, injury hampered him for the subsequent championship campaign. Hogan recovered later in the year to take his place at right half forward as Kilkenny faced Tipperary in the All-Ireland final. For long periods Tipp looked the likely winners, however, late goals from Henry Shefflin and substitute Martin Comerford finally killed off their efforts to secure a 2–22 to 0–23 victory. Hogan, who was substituted after suffering an ankle injury, had collected his first All-Ireland medal on the field of play scoring 2 points. Having won his third All Ireland senior medal, Hogan lined out a week later in the U21 All Ireland final as Kilkenny were defeated by Clare in the decider.

In 2010 Kilkenny defeated Galway in an eagerly-anticipated but ultimately disappointing provincial decider. A 1–19 to 1–12 victory gave Hogan a 3rd Leinster medal. The drive for a fifth successive All-Ireland crown reached a head on 5 September 2010, when Kilkenny faced Tipperary in the All-Ireland decider. "The Cats" lost talismen Henry Shefflin and Brian Hogan due to injury, while Tipperary's Lar Corbett ran riot and scored a hat-trick of goals as Hogan's side fell to a 4–17 to 1–18 defeat.

Kilkenny's stranglehold in Leinster continued in 2011. A 4–17 to 1–15 defeat of Dublin gave "the Cats" a record-equalling seventh successive championship. It was Hogan's fourth winners medal. Kilkenny subsequently faced Tipperary in the All-Ireland decider on 4 September 2011. Goals by Michael Fennelly and Hogan in either half gave Kilkenny, who many viewed as the underdogs going into the game, a 2–17 to 1–16 victory. Hogan collected a second All-Ireland medal before later picking up his first All-Star and finished the campaign with 4–04 in 4 championship games.

==== Continued dominance ====
Hogan received two broken ribs and a punctured lung in an accidental clash with Galway goalkeeper Jamie Ryan in the final round of the 2012 league. While a two-month absence was expected, Hogan recovered in time for the league final. A 3–21 to 0–16 demolition of old rivals Cork gave him a second league medal. Kilkenny were later shocked by Galway in the Leinster decider, losing by 2–21 to 2–11, however, both sides subsequently met in the All-Ireland decider on 9 September 2012. Kilkenny had led going into the final stretch, however, Joe Canning struck a stoppage time equaliser to level the game at 2–13 to 0–19 and send the final to a replay for the first time since 1959. The replay took place three weeks later on 30 September 2012. In an unexpected move, Hogan was moved from midfield to full forward where he scored 0–3 in an excellent deisplay. Galway stunned the reigning champions with two first-half goals, however, Kilkenny's championship debutant Walter Walsh gave a man of the match performance, claiming a 1–3 haul. The 3–22 to 3–11 Kilkenny victory gave Hogan a 5th All-Ireland medal at the age of 24.

Kilkenny's dominance showed no sign of abating in 2013, with Hogan winning a third league medal following a 2–17 to 0–20 defeat of Tipperary in the decider. Having defeated Offaly in the Leinster quarter final, Kilkenny were dumped into the All Ireland qualifiers following a defeat by Dublin in the semis after a replay. Kilkenny defeated Tipperary and Waterford before being defeated by Cork in the All Ireland quarter final in a disappointing year.

==== Hurler of the Year Season ====
In 2014 Hogan gave a Man of the Match display scoring 0-6 from centre forward collecting his fourth National league medal, as Kilkenny secured a narrow one-point 2–25 to 1–27 extra-time victory over Tipperary. Hogan gave another Man of the Match performance from midfield securing a fifth Leinster medal, as a dominant Kilkenny display gave "the Cats" a 0–24 to 1–9 defeat of Dublin. On 7 September 2014, Kilkenny lined out in an All-Ireland decider with Tipperary. In what some consider to be the greatest game of all time, the sides were level when Tipperary were awarded a controversial free. John O'Dwyer had the chance to win the game, however, his late free drifted wide resulting in a draw. Hogan's display, scoring 0-6 from midfield in that drawn game earned him the RTE Man of the Match Award. The replay on 27 September 2014 was also a close affair. Goals from brothers Richie and John Power inspired Kilkenny to a 2–17 to 2–14 victory. It was Hogan's sixth All-Ireland medal. Hogan was later voted the GAA/GPA Hurler of the Year and picked up his second All-Star.

==== 2015 ====
Kilkenny and Hogan continued their dominance into the 2015 season winning the Leinster and All Ireland titles for a second successive season defeating Galway in both finals. Hogan suffered a back injury a little over a week before the All Ireland semi final against Waterford but recovered to score 0–5. He suffered a further injury before the All Ireland final tearing a quad muscle and played the game while heavily strapped. The 1–22 to 1–18 victory in the All Ireland gave Hogan his 7th All Ireland medal in 9 seasons. Hogan was nominated for the hurler of the year award at the end of the 2015 season for a second year in a row which was ultimately won by Hogan's teammate TJ Reid.

==== 2016 ====
Hogan and Kilkenny began the 2016 season in search of a third All Ireland in a row. After a disappointing league campaign Hogan suffered a broken hand in advance of the Leinster championship. Hogan recovered in time for the Leinster final against Galway where he was introduced as a half time substitute. Struggling and 3 points down, Kilkenny introduced Hogan at half time. Hogan gave an inspired performance in the second half scoring 0-5 and leading Kilkenny to a 71st Leinster title. Seeking a historic 3-in-a-row of titles, Kilkenny were defeated by Tipperary in the All Ireland final in a comprehensive defeat. Hogan later picked up his fourth All-Star.

==== Later career ====
Hogan struggled with injury in the 2017 and 2018 seasons where Kilkenny exited the championship stages before the All Ireland semi finals. Hogan recovered for the 2019 All Ireland season scoring 1–02 against Cork in the All Ireland quarter final and 0–1 in the semi final win over All Ireland champions Limerick. In the 2019 All-Ireland hurling final Hogan was sent off after 32 minutes following a challenge on Tipperary's Cathal Barrett. Kilkenny would go on to lose the final in a one sided second half.

On 1 September 2023, Hogan announced his retirement from inter-county hurling.

=== Club ===
Hogan plays his club hurling with the Danesfort club.

In 2006 he won a junior county championship title when Danesfort defeated Tullogher-Rosbercon in the final. It was the club's first county title in that grade since 1930. Danesfort later defeated Knockbridge to claim the Leinster junior club title. Hogan later captured an All-Ireland junior club title following a 2–16 to 2–8 defeat of Clooney Gaels. Hogan was the top scorer in the final scoring 1–6, while he also received a place on the Kilkenny club all-star team of the year at right-corner forward.

Danesfort reached the Intermediate league final 3 years in a row (2009,2010 and 2011) in which they were beaten by Rower Inistiogue (09 and 11) and Mullinvat in 2010. Hogan captained Danesfort to the County Intermediate final a 2nd time in 2011. This time they were successful beating Rower Inistiogue in the final. Early goals from Hogan and Robbie Walsh set Danesfort on their way along with good performances from Kilkenny players Paddy Hogan and Paul Murphy. This was the clubs first Intermediate title since 1931.

=== Inter-provincial ===
Hogan made his debut in the Inter Provincial Championships against Connacht in 2008 scoring 9points. He later scored the decisive goal to defeat Munster in the final claiming his first Inter Provincial medal. He won a second medal in 2012 as Leinster defeated Connacht in Nowlan Park. In 2014 Hogan was at midfield on the Leinster inter-provincial team. Just 150 spectators turned up to Croke Park as Leinster defeated Connacht for the third time in four finals by 1–23 to 0–16.

== Career statistics ==
As of match played 28 May 2023 (most recent game played is 7th May 2023)

| Team | Year | National League | | | Leinster | | All-Ireland | | Total | |
| Team | Year | Division | Apps | Score | Apps | Score | Apps | Score | Apps | Score |
|---|---|---|---|---|---|---|---|---|---|---|
| Kilkenny | 2007 | Division 1 | 0 | 0-00 | 0 | 0-00 | 0 | 0-00 | 0 | 0-00 |
| Kilkenny | 2008 | Division 1 | 5 | 1-17 | 1 | 0-01 | 0 | 0-00 | 6 | 1-18 |
| Kilkenny | 2009 | Division 1 | 7 | 1-23 | 1 | 0-00 | 2 | 0-03 | 10 | 1-26 |
| Kilkenny | 2010 | Division 1 | 4 | 0-08 | 2 | 0-02 | 1 | 0-00 | 7 | 0-10 |
| Kilkenny | 2011 | Division 1 | 6 | 1-44 | 2 | 1-03 | 2 | 3-01 | 10 | 5-48 |
| Kilkenny | 2012 | Division 1A | 5 | 1-10 | 2 | 1-02 | 3 | 0-05 | 10 | 2-17 |
| Kilkenny | 2013 | Division 1A | 7 | 1-19 | 3 | 0-05 | 3 | 0-08 | 13 | 1-32 |
| Kilkenny | 2014 | Division 1A | 7 | 1-16 | 4 | 0-12 | 3 | 1-08 | 14 | 2-36 |
| Kilkenny | 2015 | Division 1A | 5 | 1-43 | 2 | 1-09 | 2 | 0-07 | 9 | 2-59 |
| Kilkenny | 2016 | Division 1A | 5 | 0-08 | 1 | 0-05 | 3 | 1-09 | 9 | 1-22 |
| Kilkenny | 2017 | Division 1A | 6 | 0-12 | 1 | 0-00 | 2 | 0-01 | 9 | 0-13 |
| Kilkenny | 2018 | Division 1A | — | | 3 | 1-01 | 1 | 1-03 | 4 | 2-04 |
| Kilkenny | 2019 | Division 1A | 3 | 0-06 | 3 | 0-00 | 3 | 1-04 | 9 | 1-10 |
| Kilkenny | 2020 | Division 1B | 3 | 1-07 | 2 | 1-02 | 1 | 0-02 | 5 | 2-11 |
| Kilkenny | 2021 | Division 1B | 0 | 0-00 | 0 | 0-00 | 1 | 0-01 | 1 | 0-01 |
| Kilkenny | 2022 | Division 1B | 0 | 0-00 | 0 | 0-00 | 1 | 0-01 | 1 | 0-01 |
| Kilkenny | 2023 | Division 1B | 0 | 0-00 | 1 | 0-00 | | | 1 | 0-00 |
| Career total | | | 63 | 8-213 | 28 | 5-42 | 28 | 7-53 | 119 | 20-308 |

== Honours ==
=== Player ===
Danesfort

- All-Ireland Junior Club Hurling Championship 2007
- Leinster Junior Club Hurling Championship: 2007
- Kilkenny Intermediate Hurling Championship: 2011 (c)
- Kilkenny Junior Hurling Championship: 2006

Kilkenny

- All-Ireland Senior Hurling Championship: 2007, 2008, 2009, 2011, 2012, 2014, 2015
- Leinster Senior Hurling Championship: 2007, 2008, 2009, 2010, 2011, 2014, 2015, 2016, 2020, 2021
- National Hurling League: 2009, 2012, 2013, 2014, 2021
- Walsh Cup: 2009, 2012, 2014, 2017
- All-Ireland Under-21 Hurling Championship: 2006, 2008
- Leinster Under-21 Hurling Championship: 2006, 2008, 2009
- Leinster Minor Hurling Championship: 2004, 2006

=== Individual ===
Awards

- GAA-GPA All-Star Award (4): 2011, 2014, 2015, 2016
- The Sunday Game Player of the Year (1): 2014
- GAA-GPA Hurler of the Year (1): 2014

Awards
| Preceded by Shane O'Donnell | All-Ireland Senior Hurling Final; Man of the Match; 2014 (drawn game) | Succeeded by Kieran Joyce |
| Preceded by Tony Kelly | GAA-GPA All-Star Hurler of the Year; 2014 | Succeeded by T. J. Reid |
