= 2005 Kilkenny Intermediate Hurling Championship =

- Teams: 12
- Champions: Dicksboro (2nd title); David Carroll (captain)
- Runners-up: Mooncoin

The 2005 Kilkenny Intermediate Hurling Championship was the 41st staging of the Kilkenny Intermediate Hurling Championship since its establishment by the Kilkenny County Board in 1929.

The final was played on 30 October 2005 at Nowlan Park in Kilkenny, between Dicksboro and Mooncoin, in what was their first ever meeting in the final. Dicksboro won the match by 0–09 to 0–07 to claim their second championship title overall and a first championship title in 14 years.

== Results ==
=== Final ===
30 October 2005 Final	Dicksboro	0-09 - 0-07	Mooncoin	Nowlan Park
