= John Sutton (hurler) =

Irish hurler

Personal information
- Native name: Seán de Sutún (Irish)
- Born: 1928 Mullinavat, County Kilkenny, Ireland
- Died: 28 April 1989 (aged 60–61) Waterford, Ireland
- Occupation: Farmer
- Height: 6 ft 1 in (185 cm)

Sport
- Sport: Hurling
- Position: Midfield
Clubs
- Years: Club
- Mullinavat; Glenmore; Carrickshock; Ferrybank
Inter-county
- Years: County
- 1951–1959: Kilkenny
Inter-county titles
- Leinster titles: 3
- All-Irelands: 1

John Sutton (1928 – May 1989) was an Irish sportsperson. He played hurling with his local club Mullinavat and was a member of the Kilkenny senior inter-county team in the 1950s. John Sutton lined out at midfield in Kilkennys 1957 All Ireland Final win. Sutton was one of the last great over head strikers of the sliotar. Sutton perfected his skill, doubling on stones high in the air as he brought the cows in on the family farm. With Kilkenny Sutton won an All-Ireland title and three Leinster titles.
