= Mick Brophy =

Irish hurler

Michael Brophy
Personal information
- Native name: Mícheál Ó Bróithe (Irish)
- Nickname: Mick Brophy
- Born: 9 October 1932 Danesfort, County Kilkenny, Ireland
- Died: 6 March 2009 (aged 76) Callan Road, Kilkenny, Ireland
- Occupation: Psychiatric nurse
- Height: 5 ft 11 in (180 cm)

Sport
- Sport: Hurling
- Position: Midfield
Club
- Years: Club
- Danesfort
Inter-county
- Years: County
- 1956-1959: Kilkenny
Inter-county titles
- Leinster titles: 3
- All-Irelands: 1

Played at midfield for Kilkenny in the 1957 All-Ireland Senior Hurling Championship Final.

== Early years ==
Mick Brophy was born on 9 October 1932 in Danesfort, County Kilkenny. His parents Thomas and Elizabeth, farmed a dairy farm in the parish which is located 5 miles from the city of Kilkenny. Up to the introduction of the parish rule, Brophy played his underage hurling with Eoghan Ruadh (Callan). He later played with his local club Danesfort, and was a member of the Kilkenny senior inter-county team in the 1950s.

== Career ==
Brophy played at midfield in the 1957 All-Ireland Senior Hurling Championship Final, when Kilkenny beat Waterford by a single point. This victory was the first for Kilkenny in ten years, since the win over Cork in the 1947 final.

The same teams, Kilkenny and Waterford, would again meet in the 1959 final when, after a draw, fortunes were reversed in the replay with a Waterford victory. This remains Waterford's last title and Mick attended the recent All Ireland final of 2008, some 49 years later, when Kilkenny overcame Waterford with relative ease to capture the first 'three in a row' since the Cork team of the seventies. Brophy had played with the Kilkenny minor teams in 1949 and 1950 capturing the All Ireland title in 1950. For many years Mick Brophy was the only Danesfort man to hold a senior All Ireland hurling medal. Presently there are two Danesfort players featuring on the Kilkenny senior team - namely Ritchie Hogan and Paul Murphy.

== Legacy ==
Renowned as a skilful left handed midfielder Brophy was especially noted for his ability to double on the ball in the air; a skill which has been largely lost from the modern game. Mick Brophy died in spring 2009 and is fondly remembered by the older contingent of Kilkenny hurling followers.
