= 1981 Kilkenny Intermediate Hurling Championship =

- Dates: 3 April - 18 October 1981
- Teams: 8
- Champions: Glenmore (1st title); Johnny Heffernan (captain)
- Runners-up: Dicksboro

The 1981 Kilkenny Intermediate Hurling Championship was the 17th staging of the Kilkenny Intermediate Hurling Championship since its establishment by the Kilkenny County Board. The draw for the opening round fixtures took place on 23 February 1981. The championship began on 3 April 1981 and ended on 18 October 1981.

The final was played on 18 October 1981 at Nowlan Park in Kilkenny, between Glenmore and Dicksboro, in what was their first meeting in a final. Glenmore won the match by 1-11 to 2-06 to claim their first championship title.

== Results ==
=== Semi-finals ===
23 August 1981 Semi-final	Dicksboro	2-12 - 1-08	Clara	Nowlan Park

20 September 1981 Semi-final	Glenmore	1-12 - 1-12	Carrickshock	Nowlan Park

3 October 1981 Semi-final replay	Glenmore	5-11 - 3-07	Carrickshock	Nowlan Park

=== Final ===
18 October 1981 Final	Glenmore	1-11 - 2-06	Dicksboro	Nowlan Park
	C Heffernan 1-2, J Murphy 0-4, B Doherty 0-2, R Heffernan 0-2, M O'Connor 0-1.		P Grace 1-4, S McGarry 1-0, P Mullally 0-1, J Marnell 0-1.	Referee: D Butler (St Lachtain's)
