= 2006–07 All-Ireland Junior Club Hurling Championship =

All Ireland Champions
- Winners: Danesfort (1st win)
- Captain: Tony Woodcock

All Ireland Runners-up
- Runners-up: Clooney Gaels
- Captain: Seán O'Connell

Provincial Champions
- Munster: Kilworth
- Leinster: Danesfort
- Ulster: Clooney Gaels
- Connacht: Skehana

The 2006–07 All-Ireland Junior Club Hurling Championship was the fourth staging of the All-Ireland Junior Club Hurling Championship since its establishment by the Gaelic Athletic Association.

The All-Ireland final was played on 11 March 2007 at Croke Park in Dublin, between Danesfort from Kilkenny and Clooney Gaels from Antrim, in what was their first ever meeting in the final. Danesfort won the match by 2-16 to 2-08 to claim their first ever All-Ireland title.

== Munster Junior Club Hurling Championship ==
=== Munster quarter-final ===
11 November 2006 Quarter-final	Kilgarvan	0-12 - 1-14	Mungret/St. Paul's	Fr. Breen Park
	M Foley 0-10, F O'Brien 0-1, K Harrington 0-1.		D Giltinane 0-4, B Begley 1-0, C Moriarty 0-3, B Tobin 0-3, J Malone 0-1, M Barron 0-1, G Barron 0-1, T Giltinane 0-1.

12 November 2006 Quarter-final	Meelick	0-08 - 2-13	Fenor	Meelick Grounds
	B O'Neill 0-3, C Sherlock 0-2, A White 0-1, D Sherlock 0-1, A Markham 0-1.		J Burns 2-4, J Hally 0-4, S Sullivan 0-2, P Kelly 0-1, W O'Neill 0-1, J Baldwin 0-1.

=== Munster semi-finals ===
26 November 2006 Semi-final	Mungret/St. Paul's	3-08 - 2-06	Knockshegowna	Moneteen Grounds
	M O'Meara 2-2, D Costelloe 1-3, K Gohery 0-2, G Gohery 0-1.		D Giltenane 1-2, J Roche 1-0, J Malone 0-1, B Tobin 0-1, C Moriarty 0-1, J Moriarty 0-1.

26 November 2006 Semi-final	Fenor	0-06 - 4-19	Kilworth	William Flynn Park
	D Burns 0-4, J Halley 0-2.		B Tobin 2-2, P Lynch 0-4, A Kenny 0-4, J Cahill 1-0, N Gowen 1-0, E Pierce 0-2, A Mannix 0-2, D O'Donoghue 0-2, D Cahill 0-1, N O'Brien 0-1, J Moakley 0-1.

=== Munster final ===
16 December 2006 Final	Kilworth	4-16 - 1-07	Knockshegowna	Meelick Grounds
	P Lynch 1-8, D O'Donoghue 2-1, A Mannix 1-1, B Tobin 0-2, J Cahill 0-1, T Twomey 0-1, E Pierce 0-1, J Moakley 0-1.		D Costello 1-5, G Gohery 0-1, M Kennedy 0-1.	Referee: M O'Connor (Limerick)

== All-Ireland Junior Club Hurling Championship ==
=== All-Ireland quarter-final ===
27 January 2007 Quarter-final	Kilworth	5-13 - 0-06	Graunaile	Meelick Sportsfield
	A Mannix 2-4, P Lynch 1-6, J Cahill 1-0, S Beecher 1-0, D O'Donoghue 0-1, A Kenny 0-1, B Tobin 0-1.		R Barnes 0-2, C Keeshin 0-1, K Haugh 0-1, J Dunne 0-1, E Gormley 0-1.

=== All-Ireland semi-finals ===
10 February 2007 Semi-final	Clooney Gaels	0-13 - 1-09	Skehana	St. Loman's Park
	G Graham 0-6, D Neeson 0-2, S McMahon 0-2, J Downey 0-1, Declan Graham 0-1, S O'Connell 0-1.		F Finnerty 1-1, J Glynn 0-4, Damien Costello 0-2, P Kelly 0-1, B Costello 0-1.	Referee: J Kelly (Wexford)

10 February 2007 Semi-final	Danesfort	0-12 - 0-10	Kilworth	Fraher Field
	R Hogan 0-7, R Walsh 0-3, P Hogan 0-2.		P Lynch 0-5, A Mannix 0-3, E Pierce 0-1, J Cahill 0-1.	Referee: J Owens (Wexford)

=== All-Ireland final ===
11 March 2007 Final	Danesfort	2–16 – 2–08	Clooney Gaels	Croke Park
	R Hogan 1–7 (2f), G Power 1–0, P Murphy, P Hogan 0–2 each, R Walsh, P Forrestal, D Forrestal, R Devane, F Minogue (f) 0–1 each.	Report	G Graham 1–7 (2f), M Friel 1–0, S McMahon 0–1.	Referee: G Hoesy (Clare)

== Championship statistics ==
=== Miscellaneous ===
- Skehana became the first team to win consecutive Connacht Championship titles.
