= Clooney Gaels GAC =

Antrim-based Gaelic games club

Clooney Gaels
- Ghaeil Chluanaidh
- Founded: 1943
- County: Antrim
- Nickname: 'Gaels
- Colours: Red and Black
- Grounds: Fr McGuigan Park
- Coordinates: 54°49′25.80″N 6°23′15.73″W

Playing kits
Standard colours

Clooney Gaels (Irish: Ghaeil Chluanaidh) are a Gaelic Athletic Association hurling club based in Clooney (Cloney) outside Ahoghill, County Antrim, Northern Ireland. The team is the hurling section of St Mary's GAC, Ahoghill. This team's catchment area is Ahoghill, Clooney, Portglenone and Moneyglass.

"The Gaels" did well in 2006/7, winning the County Antrim Junior Hurling Championship, Ulster Junior Hurling Championship and playing their way to the 2007 All-Ireland Junior Hurling Championship Final before being defeated by Danesfort (Kilkenny).

== Roll of honour ==
=== Hurling ===
- Ulster Intermediate Club Hurling Championship – 2013 (Winners)
- Antrim Intermediate Hurling Championship – 2013 (Winners)
- All-Ireland Junior Club Hurling Championship – 2007 (Runners up)
- Ulster Junior Club Hurling Championship – 2006 (Winners)
- Antrim All County Div 3 Hurling League – 2005 (Winners)
- Ulster Hurling League Div 3 – 2005 (Winners)
- Barcelona Gaels Inaugural Hurling Tournament – 2005 (Winners)
- Antrim All County Div 4 Hurling League – 2000 (Winners)
