= Kilkenny Intermediate Football Championship =

Annual Gaelic football competition

- Irish: Craobh Peile Idirmhéanach Chill Chainnigh
- Founded: 1990
- Title holders: Conahy Shamrocks
- Most titles: Multiple teams (4 titles)
- Sponsors: J. J. Kavanagh & Sons

The Kilkenny Intermediate Football Championship (also known for sponsorship reasons as the JJ Kavanagh & Sons Kilkenny Intermediate Football Championship) is an annual Gaelic football competition which has been organised by the Kilkenny County Board of the Gaelic Athletic Association since 1990, for the second-tier football teams in County Kilkenny, Ireland.

The series of games are played during the autumn and winter months with the county final played in December. The championship has historically been played on a straight knockout basis whereby once a team loses they are eliminated from the series.

The title has been won at least once by seventeen different clubs. The all-time record-holders are Barrow Rangers, Piltown, Mullinavat, Kilmoganny and Thomastown, who have all won the competition twice.

Conahy Shamrocks became the 2017 title-holders after defeating Rower-Inistioge 1-08 to 0-08 in the final.

== History ==
The championship was created by the Kilkenny County Board in 1990. It forms the second-tier of club football in Kilkenny.

== Format ==
=== Championship format ===
The championship has historically been played on a straight knockout basis whereby once a team loses they are eliminated from the series.

Final: The winner of the final is promoted to the Kilkenny Senior Football Championship.

== Qualification for subsequent competitions ==
The winning club in the Kilkenny IFC progresses to the Leinster Junior Club Football Championship, the winners of which compete for the All-Ireland Junior Club Football Championship.

== List of finals ==
#	Winners		Runners-up	
#	Club	Score	Club	Score
2017	Conahy Shamrocks	1-08	Rower–Inistioge	0-08

== Roll of honour ==
Note: Only included clubs with 2 or more titles

#	Club	Titles
1	Barrow Rangers	2
1	Kilmoganny	2
1	Mullinavat	2
1	Piltown	2
1	Thomastown	2

== See also ==
- Kilkenny Intermediate Hurling Championship
