= Willie O'Dwyer =

Irish hurler

Personal information
- Native name: Liam Ó Dubhuir (Irish)
- Born: 4 April 1984 (age 42) Mullinavat, County Kilkenny, Ireland
- Height: 5 ft 10 in (178 cm)

Sport
- Sport: Hurling
- Position: Forward
Club
- Years: Club
- Mullinavat
Inter-county
Years	County	Apps (scores)
2006–2009 2012–2013	Kilkenny Kerry	9 (2–06)
Inter-county titles
- Leinster titles: 4
- All-Irelands: 5

Willie O'Dwyer (born 4 April 1984) is an Irish sportsperson from Mullinavat, County Kilkenny, Ireland. He plays hurling with his local club, Mullinavat, the Kilkenny senior inter-county team from 2003 to 2009, and the Kerry intercounty team from 2012.

== Playing career ==
O'Dwyer played in the U-21 All-Ireland against Tipperary in 2004, where he received the Man of the Match award. He is the Leading player for his club, Mullinavat, where he plays in the forwards. He also played with Waterford IT in the Fitzgibbon Cup Colleges Hurling. In 2007, O'Dwyer also lined out for Dublin IT in the Fitzgibbon Cup. He won 3 Kilkenny Intermediate Hurling Championships with his club Mullinavat in 2001, 2006, and 2014.

=== Kilkenny ===
He was part of the 2002 Kilkenny minor team that won that year's All Ireland. He then moved on to the Under 21 team and won an All Ireland in 2004.

O'Dwyer was part of the Kilkenny senior hurling panel from 2003 to 2009. He came on as a sub when Kilkenny beat Cork, who won the 2006 All Ireland for the first time since 2003. He played in the corner forward position in the Leinster Senior Hurling final against Wexford in 2007, where he scored 2-03. He later played in the All Ireland final where Kilkenny overcame Limerick. He remained on the panel for the 2008 and 2009 All-Ireland wins.

He was part of the county Intermediate team that won the 2011 Leinster Intermediate Hurling Championship after a win over Wexford.

=== Kerry ===
Having lived and worked in Tralee for several years, he joined John Meylers Kerry for the 2012 season. He played in all of Kerry's Div 2A League games, as they missed out on the final. He then lined out in the Christy Ring Cup, in the first round, Kerry had a shock loss to Wicklow. In the losers' rounds, they had another shock loss this time to Kildare.

In 2013, he was again part of the Kerry side that just missed out on a place in the Div 2A final and promotion to Div 1B. After a disappointing 2012 Christy Ring Cup, Kerry regrouped to make it to the final for the third time in four seasons, but lost out to a last-minute goal to Down.

== Honours ==
- 5 All-Ireland Senior Hurling Medals
- 1 All-Ireland Minor Hurling Medal
- 2 Leinster Minor Hurling Medals
- 2 U21 All-Ireland Hurling Medal
- 3 U21 Leinster Hurling Medals
- 5 Leinster Senior Hurling Medals
- 3 National Hurling League Medals
- 2 Walsh Cup
- 1 Leinster Club Intermediate
- 3 Kilkenny Intermediate Club Championship Medals
- 1 Kilkenny Minor Club Championship Medal
- 6 Kilkenny Senior Gaelic Football Championships
