= Danesfort CLG =

Gaelic games club in County Kilkenny, Ireland

Danesfort
- Dún Fearta
- Founded: 1922
- County: Kilkenny
- Colours
- Grounds: Danesfort GAA Grounds
- Coordinates: 52°35′00″N 7°14′26″W

Playing kits
Standard colours

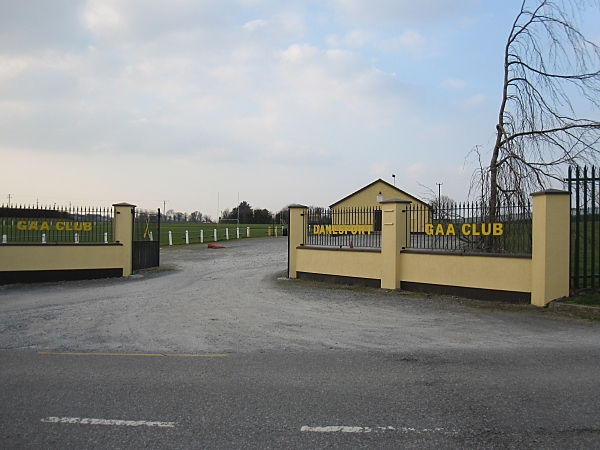
Gates and club house of Danesfort CLG

Danesfort GAA is a Gaelic Athletic Association club in Danesfort, County Kilkenny, Ireland. The club is affiliated to the Kilkenny County Board and is exclusively concerned with the game of hurling.

== History ==
Located in the village of Danesfort, about 6 km from Kilkenny, Danesfort GAA Club was founded in 1922. The new club was in its infancy when it had its first major success, after being awarded the Kilkenny JHC title in 1925. A second Kilkenny JHC title followed in 1930 - the club's first on the field of play. Danesfort secured senior status for the first time when, in 1931, the Kilkenny IHC title was won, following a 4–06 to 4–01 win over Slieverue.

After 75 years, Danesfort claimed their third Kilkenny JHC title after a single point win over Tullogher–Rosbercon in 2006. This was later followed by a Leinster Club JHC title. Danesfort also won the All-Ireland Club JHC, following a 2–16 to 2–08 win over Clooney Gael in the 2007 All-Ireland Club JHC final.

Danesfort had further Kilkenny IHC successes in 2011, 2022 and 2025, to put them joint-first on the all-time roll of honour.

On Saturday 18 October 2025, the Danesfort Intermediate Camogie team beat Mooncoin (2:10 to 2:03) to claim their first Intermediate county title and earn promotion to the Senior championship in 2026. 24 hours later, on Sunday 19 October, the men's team defeated James Stephens in the Intermediate County final - also promoting them once again to Senior grade.

== Honours ==
- Leinster Intermediate Club Hurling Championship (1): 2025
- Kilkenny Intermediate Hurling Championship (4): 1931, 2011, 2022, 2025
- Northern Kilkenny Intermediate Hurling Championship (1): 1931
- All-Ireland Junior Club Hurling Championship (1): 2007
- Leinster Junior Club Hurling Championship (1): 2006
- Kilkenny Junior Hurling Championship (3): 1925, 1930, 2006

== Notable players ==
- Mick Brophy: All-Ireland SHC–winner (1957)
- Richie Hogan: All-Ireland SHC–winner (2007, 2008, 2009, 2011, 2012, 2014, 2015)
- Paul Murphy: All-Ireland SHC–winner (2011, 2012, 2014, 2015)
