= Kilkenny Intermediate Hurling Championship =

- Current season or competition: 2026 Kilkenny Intermediate Hurling Championship
- Irish: Craobh Iomána Idirmhéanach Chill Chainnigh
- Code: Hurling
- Founded: 1929; 97 years ago
- Region: Kilkenny (GAA)
- Trophy: Hanrahan Cup
- No. of teams: 12
- Title holders: James Stephens (1st title)
- Most titles: Conahy Shamrocks (4 titles); Mullinavat (4 titles); Clara (4 titles)
- Sponsors: Michael Lyng Motors Hyundai
- Official website: Official website

The Kilkenny Intermediate Hurling Championship (known for sponsorship reasons as Michael Lyng Motors Intermediate Hurling Championship and abbreviated to the Kilkenny IHC) is an annual hurling competition organised by the Kilkenny County Board of the Gaelic Athletic Association and contested by intermediate clubs in the county of Kilkenny in Ireland. It is the second tier overall in the entire Kilkenny hurling championship system.

The Kilkenny Intermediate Championship was introduced in 1929 as a competition that would bridge the gap between the senior grade and the junior grade. The championship was suspended for over 30 years until the 1970s when it was reinstated.

In its current format, the Kilkenny Intermediate Championship begins in September with a first round series of games comprising eight teams, while the four remaining teams receive byes to the quarter-final stage. A team's finishing position in the Kilkenny Intermediate League determines at what stage they enter the championship. Four rounds of games are played, culminating with the final match at UPMC Nowlan Park in October. The winner of the Kilkenny Intermediate Championship, as well as being presented with the Hanrahan Cup, qualifies for the subsequent Leinster Club Championship and gains automatic entry into the following year's Kilkenny Senior Championship.

The competition has been won by 30 teams. Clara, Conahy Shamrocks, Danesfort and Mullinavat and are the most successful teams in the tournament's history, having won it four times each. James Stephens are the reigning champions, having beaten the Rower-Inistioge by 1–16 to 0–16 in the 2026 final.

== Teams ==
=== 2026 Teams ===
The 12 teams competing in the 2026 Kilkenny Intermediate Hurling Championship were:

Team	Location	Colours	Position in 2026	In championship since	Championship titles	Last championship title
Barrow Rangers	Paulstown and Goresbridge	Blue and White	Quarter-finals	2026	0	—
Blacks and Whites	Skeoughvosteen	Black and white	Relegation Play-off	2023	0	—
Carrickshock	Hugginstown	Green and gold	Round 1	2019	2	2016
Dunnamaggin	Dunnamaggin	Green and gold	Quarter-finals	2019	2	2000
James Stephens	Kilkenny	Green and red	Champion	2025	1	2026
Lisdowney	Lisdowney	Blue and white	Semi-finals	2026	2	2024
Mooncoin	Mooncoin	Green and white	Round 1	2022	2	1994
Rower–Inistioge	Inistioge	Green and red	Runners-up	2022	1	2013
St Lachtain's	Freshford, County Kilkenny	Black and amber	Quarter-finals	2025	2	2009
St Martin's	Fassadinin	Red and green	Relegated	2018	1	2002
Tullogher–Rosbercon	Rosbercon	Black and amber	Semi-finals	2024	0	—
Young Irelands	Gowran	Red and white	Quarter-finals	2010	1	1992

== Qualification for subsequent competitions ==
At the end of the championship, the winning team qualify to the subsequent Leinster Intermediate Club Hurling Championship, the winner of which progresses to the All-Ireland Intermediate Club Hurling Championship.

== Roll of honour ==
=== By club ===
#	Club	Titles	Championships won	Lost	Championships Lost
1	Clara	4	1982, 1998, 2007, 2012	3	1991, 2004, 2006
1	Mullinavat	4	1989, 2001, 2006, 2014	2	1999, 2010
1	Conahy Shamrocks	4	1930, 1932, 1977, 1986	1	1992
1	Danesfort	4	1931, 2011, 2022, 2025	1	2008
2	Graignamanagh	3	1976, 1980, 1985	6	1973, 1974, 1975, 1984, 1996, 1997
2	Dicksboro	3	1991, 2005, 2010	5	1976, 1977, 1979, 1981, 2009
2	John Locke's	3	1935, 1993, 1999	0	
3	Thomastown	2	1983, 2023	6	1980, 1990, 1993, 2019, 2020, 2022
3	Mooncoin	2	1990, 1994	5	1930, 1998, 2004, 2005, 2023
3	St Patrick's	2	1979, 2017	3	2012, 2014, 2015
3	Carrickshock	2	2004, 2016	3	1982, 2002, 2003
3	O'Loughlin Gaels	2	1978, 1996	2	1983, 1987
3	St Lachtain's	2	1984, 2009	2	2007, 2021
3	Graigue-Ballycallan	2	1987, 2018	1	2017
3	Tullaroan	2	1988, 2019	1	2018
3	Lisdowney	2	2020, 2024	1	1978
3	Ballyhale Shamrocks	2	1974, 1997	0	
3	Glenmore	2	1981, 2021	0	
3	Dunnamaggin	2	1995, 2000	0	
3	Erin's Own	2	2003, 2008	0	
4	Young Ireland's	1	1992	3	1989, 1991, 2024
4	Rower-Inistioge	1	2013	1	2011, 2026
4	Bennettsbridge	1	2015	2	1936, 1995
4	Slieverue	1	1936	1	1931
4	St Martin's	1	2002	1	2000
4	James Stephens	0	2026	1	2025
4	Urlingford	1	1929	0	
4	St Fiacre's	1	1934	0	
4	Éire Óg	1	1937	0	
4	Coon	1	1973	0	
4	Muckalee/Ballyfoyle Rangers	1	1975	0	
5	Piltown	0		3	1985, 1986, 1988
5	Kilmacow	0		1	1929
5	Emeralds	0		1	2013

== List of finals ==
=== Legend ===
- Gold – All-Ireland intermediate club champions
- Silver – All-Ireland intermediate club runners-up

=== List of Kilkenny IHC finals ===
Year	Winners		Runners-up	
Year	Club	Score	Club	Score
2026	James Stephens	1-16	Rower-Inistioge	0-16
2025	Danesfort	2-20	James Stephens	1-16
2024	Lisdowney	2-12	Young Irelands	0-15
2023*	Thomastown	1-29	Mooncoin	0-17
2022*	Danesfort	1-36	Thomastown	4-25
2021	Glenmore	3-19	St Lachtain's	2-09
2020*	Lisdowney	1-23	Thomastown	1-23
2019	Tullaroan	3-18	Thomastown	0-21
2018	Graigue-Ballycallan	2-16	Tullaroan	2-13
2017	St Patrick's	1-19	Graigue-Ballycallan	2-10
2016	Carrickshock	0-13	Tullogher-Rosbercon	0-06
2015	Bennettsbridge	1-16 (0-20)	St Patrick's	1-14 (3-11)
2014	Mullinavat	0-17	St Patrick's	0-14
2013	Rower-Inistioge	2-13	Emeralds	2-11
2012	Clara	1-07	St Patrick's	0-04
2011	Danesfort	2-11	Rower-Inistioge	0-11
2010	Dicksboro	2-12	Mullinavat	2-11
2009	St Lachtain's	0-16	Dicksboro	1-11
2008	Erin's Own	2-10	Danesfort	1-10
2007	Clara	1-15	St Lachtain's	0-12
2006	Mullinavat	1-21	Clara	2-11
2005	Dicksboro	0-09	Mooncoin	0-07
2004	Carrickshock	0-14	Mooncoin	1-10
2003	Erin's Own	2-12	Carrickshock	1-14
2002	St Martin's	1-14	Carrickshock	0-13
2001	Mullinavat	2-10 (1-05)	Clara	2-07 (1-05)
2000	Dunnamaggin	5-09	St Martin's	1-06
1999	John Locke's	0-15	Mullinavat	1-09
1998	Clara	0-12	Mooncoin	0-10
1997	Ballyhale Shamrocks	4-12	Graignamanagh	3-07
1996	O'Loughlin Gaels	2-13	Graignamanagh	2-08
1995	Dunnamaggin	2-21	Bennettsbridge	1-09
1994	Mooncoin	2-14	Clara	1-09
1993	John Locke's	3-11	Thomastown	2-12
1992	Young Irelands	2-12	Conahy Shamrocks	1-07
1991	Dicksboro	4-09	Young Irelands	1-08
1990	Mooncoin	4-09	Thomastown	1-09
1989	Mullinavat	2-13	Young Irelands	0-14
1988	Tullaroan	4-13	Piltown	2-12
1987	Graigue-Ballycallan	2-05 (2-08)	O'Loughlin Gaels	0-08 (2-08)
1986	Conahy Shamrocks	1-10	Piltown	1-07
1985	Graignamanagh	4-11	Piltown	2-10
1984	St Lachtain's	2-14	Graignamanagh	1-06
1983	Thomastown	2-08	O'Loughlin Gaels	1-03
1982	Clara	0-13	Carrickshock	0-09
1981	Glenmore	1-11	Dicksboro	2-06
1980	Graignamanagh	4-12	Thomastown	1-16
1979	St Patrick's	1-18	Dicksboro	0-07
1978	O'Loughlin Gaels	2-21	Lisdowney	4-07
1977	Conahy Shamrocks	3-09	Dicksboro	1-14
1976	Graignamanagh	0-11	Dicksboro	1-06
1975	Muckalee/Ballyfoyle Rangers	4-11	Graignamanagh	1-09
1974	Ballyhale Shamrocks	3-09	Graignamanagh	2-06
1973	Coon	4-08	Graignamanagh	3-06
1938–1972	No Championship			
1937	Eire Og	8-04	Moonroe	1-02
1936	Slieve Rua	8-04	Bennettsbridge	2-03
1935	John Locke's	1-04	St Kieran's, Johnstown	2-00
1934	St Fiacre's	3-02	Gren & Whites (The Rower)	2-03
1933	No Championship			
1932	Conahy Shamrocks	5-02 (3-02) (4-02)	Crowraddy	4-03 (3-02) (4-02)
1931	Danesfort	4-06	Sliabh Ruadh	4-01
1930	Conahy Shamrocks	6-01	Mooncoin	1-01
1929	Urlingford	6-00	Kilmacow	2-01

=== Notes ===
- 2020: Lisdowney won on penalties
- 2022: Danesfort won AET

== See also ==
- Kilkenny Senior Hurling Championship (Tier 1)
- Kilkenny Premier Junior Hurling Championship (Tier 3)
- Kilkenny Intermediate Football Championship
