= Dunnamaggin GAA =

Gaelic games club in County Kilkenny, Ireland

Dunnamaggin
- Dún Iomagáin
- Founded: 1897
- County: Kilkenny
- Colours: Green and gold
- Grounds: Hayden Park
- Coordinates: 52°30′08.48″N 7°17′20.88″W

Playing kits
Standard colours

Senior Club Championships
| | All Ireland | Leinster champions | Kilkenny champions |
|---|---|---|---|
| Hurling: | - | - | 1 |

Dunnamaggin is a Gaelic Athletic Association club situated in the south of County Kilkenny, Ireland. The club was founded in 1897, but had to wait ninety-four years for its first senior county title, taking home the junior trophy in 1994.

Despite being based in one of the smallest parishes in the county, many Dunnamaggin hurlers have gone on to play with the Kilkenny intercounty team. The club also won the senior title in 1997.

== Honours ==
- Kilkenny Senior Hurling Championships (1): 1997
- Kilkenny Intermediate Hurling Championships (2): 1995, 2000
- Kilkenny Junior Hurling Championships (2): 1994, 2018
- Leinster Junior Club Hurling Championship (1): 2018
- All-Ireland Junior Club Hurling Championship (1): 2019
- Kilkenny Minor Hurling Championships (4): 1993, 1995, 1998, 2017
- Kilkenny Under-21 Hurling Championships (4): 1995, 1996, 1998, 1999

== Notable players ==
- Jim ‘Link’ Walsh
- Tom Walsh
- Tom Hickey
- Noel Hickey
- Canice Hickey
