= Conahy Shamrocks GAA =

Gaelic Athletic Association club in Ireland

Conahy Shamrock
- Conacaidh na Seamróga
- Founded: 1886
- County: Kilkenny
- Colours
- Grounds: Polo Grounds
- Coordinates: 52°44′40.82″N 7°17′42.39″W

Playing kits
Standard colours

Senior Club Championships
	All Ireland	Leinster champions	Kilkenny champions
Football:	0	0	1
Hurling:	0	0	0

Conahy Shamrocks GAA Club is a Gaelic Athletic Association club in Jenkinstown, County Kilkenny, Ireland. The club is affiliated to the Kilkenny County Board and fields teams in hurling and Gaelic football.

== History ==
Located in Jenkinstown, about 9 km north of Kilkenny city, Conahy Shamrocks GAA Club was founded in 1886. The new club adopted green and orange as its colours, registered a Gaelic football team and took part in a number of practice games as well as the Kilkenny SFC. After a period of inactivity, Conahy Shamrocks reformed and won Kilkenny IHC titles in 1930 and 1932. As Conahy Sarsfields, the club won their sole Kilkenny SFC title in 1947, following a 2–02 to 1–03 win over Glenmore in the final.

Conahy Shamrocks subsequently returned to the junior ranks in both codes and claimed a Kilkenny JHC-JFC double in 1976. The club secured a second successive promotion and senior status in 1977, after claiming a third Kilkenny IHC title after a 3–09 to 1–14 win over Dicksboro in the final. Conahy Shamrocks won a record fourth Kilkenny IHC title in 1986.

The 21st century saw Conahy Shamrcocks win a second Kilkenny JHC in 2007, following a 0–17 to 1–11 win over Tullogher–Rosbercon in the final. The Leinster Club JHC title was later won, following a win over Castlepollard. Conahy Shamrocks ended the season by winning the All-Ireland Club JHC title in February 2008, following a 0–19 to 1–09 defeat of Moyle Rovers in the final. The club won a second All-Ireland Club JHC title in January 2020, following a 0-22 to 0-15 win over Russell Rovers.

== Honours ==
- Kilkenny Senior Football Championship (1): 1947
- Kilkenny Intermediate Hurling Championship (4): 1930, 1932, 1977, 1986
- Kilkenny Intermediate Football Championship (2): 2011, 2017
- All-Ireland Junior Club Hurling Championship (2): 2008, 2020
- Leinster Junior Club Hurling Championship(2): 2008, 2019
- Kilkenny Premier Junior Hurling Championship (4): 1976, 2007, 2020, 2026
- Kilkenny Junior Football Championship (1): 1976

== Notable players ==
- Canice Brennan: All-Ireland SHC-winner (2000)
- Kieran Brennan: All-Ireland SHC-winner (1982, 1983)
- Nickey Brennan: All-Ireland SHC-winner (1974, 1975, 1979, 1982, 1983) and President of the Gaelic Athletic Association (2006–2009)
