= Mullinavat GAA =

Gaelic games club in County Kilkenny, Ireland

Mullinavat
- Muilleann an Bhata
- Founded: 1887
- County: Kilkenny
- Colours: Black and white
- Grounds: Mullinavat

Playing kits
Standard colours

Senior Club Championships
	All Ireland	Leinster champions	Kilkenny champions
Football:	0	0	9
Hurling:	0	0	0
Camogie:	0	1	4

Mullinavat GAA is a Gaelic Athletic Association club located in Mullinavat, County Kilkenny, Ireland. The club was founded in 1887 and fields teams in hurling, Gaelic football, camogie and handball.

== Honours ==
=== Hurling ===
- Leinster Intermediate Club Hurling Championship: (1) 2014
- Kilkenny Intermediate Club Hurling Championship (4): 1989, 2001, 2007, 2014
- Kilkenny Junior Hurling Championship (4) 1915, 1916, 1939, 1984
- Kilkenny Under-21 A Hurling Championship (1): 2013
- Kilkenny Minor A Hurling Championship: (1) 1939

=== Football ===
- Leinster Intermediate Club Football Championship: Runners-Up 2019
- Kilkenny Senior Club Football Championship (9): 2007, 2017, 2018, 2019, 2020, 2022, 2023, 2025, 2026
- Kilkenny Intermediate Football Championship (2): 2000, 2004
- Kilkenny Junior Football Championship (1): 1933

=== Camogie ===
- Leinster Senior Club Camogie Championship: (1) 2013
- Kilkenny Senior Camogie Championship: (4) 2010, 2012, 2013, 2015

== Notable players ==
- Jack Duggan
- John Sutton
- Mossy Murphy
- Willie O'Dwyer
