= Tullogher–Rosbercon GAA =

Gaelic games club in County Kilkenny, Ireland

Tullogher–Rosbercon
- Tulach Thóir–Ros Uí Beirchain
- Founded: 1888
- County: Kilkenny
- Colours: Black and amber
- Grounds: Rosbercon

Playing kits
Standard colours

Senior Club Championships
	All Ireland	Leinster champions	Kilkenny champions
Football:	0	0	8
Hurling:	0	0	0

Tullogher–Rosbercon GAA is a Gaelic Athletic Association club located in Rosbercon, County Kilkenny, Ireland. The club was founded in 1888 and fields teams in both hurling and Gaelic football.

== Honours ==
- Kilkenny Senior Club Football Championships: (8) 1930, 1931, 1934, 1936, 1937, 1941, 1944, 1962
- Kilkenny Intermediate Football Championships: (2) 1994, 2018
- All-Ireland Junior Club Hurling Championships: (1) 2024
- Leinster Junior Club Hurling Championships: (2) 2008, 2023
- Kilkenny Junior Hurling Championship: (6) 1957, 1989, 1992, 1997, 2008, 2023
- Kilkenny Junior Football Championship: (6) 1922, 1928, 1935, 1948, 1986, 2016

== Notable players ==
- Walter Walsh
