= 1929 Kilkenny Intermediate Hurling Championship =

- Dates: 23 February 1930
- Teams: 2
- Champions: Urlingford (1st title)
- Runners-up: Kilmacow

Tournament statistics
- Matches played: 1
- Goals scored: 8 (8 per match)
- Points scored: 1 (1 per match)

The 1929 Kilkenny Intermediate Hurling Championship was the inaugural staging of the Kilkenny Intermediate Hurling Championship since its establishment by the Kilkenny County Board. The championship consisted of just one game between the two divisional championship winners.

The final was played on 23 February 1930 at Nowlan Park in Kilkenny, between Urlingford and Kilmacow, in what was their first meeting in a final. Urlingford won the match by 6–00 to 2–01 to claim their first championship title.

== Qualification ==
Championship	Champions
North Kilkenny Intermediate Hurling Championship	Urlingford
South Kilkenny Intermediate Hurling Championship	Kilmacow

== Results ==
=== Final ===
23 February 1930 Final	Urlingford	6-00 - 2-01	Kilmacow	Nowlan Park
