= 2019 Kilkenny Junior Hurling Championship =

- Dates: 3 September – 20 October 2019
- Teams: 19
- Sponsor: JJ Kavanagh and Sons
- Champions: O'Loughlin Gaels (3rd title)
- Runners-up: Conahy Shamrocks
- Relegated: none

The 2019 Kilkenny Junior Hurling Championship was the 109th staging of the competition since its establishment by the Kilkenny County Board in 1905 and ran from 3 September to 20 October 2019.

The competition consisted of 19 teams divided into sections A and B. Section A comprised 12 junior-grade clubs represented by their first-team panels. Section B comprised seven senior/intermediate-grade clubs represented by their second-team panels. Three teams from Section A (quarter-final winners) and one from Section B (final winner) advanced to the combined semi-final stage.

O'Loughlin Gaels defeated Conahy Shamrocks by 1–17 to 1–15 in the final on 20 October 2019 at Nowlan Park. As 2019 junior champions they were promoted to the 2020 Kilkenny Intermediate Hurling Championship.

No team was relegated from the 2019 junior championship.

== Teams ==
=== Section A ===
- Barrow Rangers
- Blacks & Whites
- Cloneen
- Conahy Shamrocks
- Emeralds
- Galmoy
- Graignamanagh
- Kilmacow
- Mooncoin (Note: relegated from 2018 Kilkenny Intermediate Hurling Championship)
- Piltown
- Slieverue
- Windgap

=== Section B ===
- Ballyhale Shamrocks
- Clara
- Dicksboro
- James Stephens
- O'Loughlin Gaels
- Rower–Inistioge
- St Patrick's

== Results ==
=== Section B ===
==== Round 1 ====
3 September 2019; Section B Round 1	Clara	2–15 2–15	Ballyhale Shamrocks	Thomastown; Referee: P Dunphy

10 September 2019; Section B Round 1 replay	Clara	3–14 2–14	Ballyhale Shamrocks	Dunmore; Referee: J McCormack

==== Quarter-finals ====
10 September 2019; Section B Quarter-final	Rower–Inistioge	3–20 2–11	St Patrick's	Clara; Referee: D Hughes

15 September 2019; Section B Quarter-final	James Stephens	2–14 2–13	Clara	Gowran; Referee: S Delaney

==== Semi-finals ====
15 September 2019; Section B Semi-final	Dicksboro	0–22 0–07	Rower–Inistioge	Thomastown; Referee: E Hayes

22 September 2019; Section B Semi-final	O'Loughlin Gaels	3–24 5–18	James Stephens	Danesfort; Referee: G Rafter

28 September 2019; Section B Semi-final replay	O'Loughlin Gaels	1–16 1–12	James Stephens	Palmerstown

==== Final ====
6 October 2019; Section B Final	Dicksboro	2–12 2–16	O'Loughlin Gaels	Freshford; Referee: M Flynn

=== Section A ===
==== Round 1 ====
15 September 2019; Section A Round 1	Graignamanagh	2–10 1–20	Emeralds	Clara; Referee: C Everard

15 September 2019; Section A Round 1	Piltown	2–22 0–12	Windgap	Dunnamaggin; Referee: P Cahill

15 September 2019; Section A Round 1	Conahy Shamrocks	3–31 2–11	Kilmacow	Bennettsbridge; Referee: M O'Sullivan

15 September 2019; Section A Round 1	Barrow Rangers	3–18 1–05	Cloneen	Castlecomer; Referee: S McMahon

15 September 2019; Section A Round 1	Mooncoin	1–24 0–14	Blacks & Whites	Ballyhale; Referee: J Kennedy

15 September 2019; Section A Round 1	Galmoy	0–13 2–17	Slieverue	St John's Park; Referee: D Hughes

==== Quarter-finals ====
28 September 2019; Section A Quarter-final	Conahy Shamrocks	1–17 0–08	Mooncoin	Callan; Referee: O Kenny

28 September 2019; Section A Quarter-final	Emeralds	2–13 1–17	Slieverue	Danesfort; Referee: G Rafter

28 September 2019; Section A Quarter-final	Piltown	0–12 2–25	Barrow Rangers	Ballyhale; Referee: M O'Sullivan

=== Combined Play-offs ===
==== Semi-finals ====
6 October 2019; Semi-final	Conahy Shamrocks	0–25 0–17	Slieverue	Nowlan Park; Referee: D Hughes

13 October 2019; Semi-final	Barrow Rangers	1–20 4–12	O'Loughlin Gaels	Nowlan Park; Referee: P Burke

==== Final ====
20 October 2019; Final	Conahy Shamrocks	1–15 1–17	O'Loughlin Gaels	Nowlan Park; Referee: C Everard
