= 2018 Kilkenny Junior Hurling Championship =

- Dates: 25 August – 21 October 2018
- Teams: 20
- Sponsor: JJ Kavanagh and Sons
- Champions: Dunnamaggin (2nd title)
- Runners-up: Piltown
- Relegated: Tullaroan

The 2018 Kilkenny Junior Hurling Championship was the 108th staging of the competition since its establishment by the Kilkenny County Board in 1905 and ran from 25 August to 21 October 2018.

The competition consisted of 20 teams divided into sections A and B. Section A comprised 12 junior-grade clubs represented by their first-team panels. Section B comprised eight senior/intermediate-grade clubs represented by their second-team panels. Three teams from Section A (quarter-final winners) and one from Section B (final winner) advanced to the combined semi-final stage.

Dunnamaggin defeated Piltown by 1–16 to 2–08 in the final on 21 October 2018 at Nowlan Park, Kilkenny. As 2018 junior champions they were promoted to the 2019 Kilkenny Intermediate Hurling Championship.

Clara defeated Tullaroan in the Section B relegation play-off by 5–21 to 3–19, preserving their place in the top junior grade. The losing side were demoted to the Kilkenny Junior A Hurling Championship for 2019.

== Teams ==
=== Section A ===
- Barrow Rangers
- Blacks and Whites
- Cloneen
- Conahy Shamrocks
- Dunnamaggin (Note: relegated from 2017 Kilkenny Intermediate Hurling Championship)
- Emeralds
- Galmoy
- Graiguenamanagh
- Kilmacow
- Piltown
- Slieverue
- Windgap

=== Section B ===
- Ballyhale Shamrocks
- Clara
- Dicksboro
- James Stephens
- O'Loughlin Gaels
- Rower-Inistioge
- St Patrick's (Note: promoted from 2017 Kilkenny Junior A Hurling Championship)
- Tullaroan

== Results ==
=== Section B ===
==== Round 1 ====
25 August 2018; Section B Round 1	Clara	2–16 3–18	St Patrick's	Jenkinstown; Referee: G Rafter

26 August 2018; Section B Round 1	Rower–Inistioge	5–21 2–11	Tullaroan	Danesfort; Referee: R Byrne

==== Quarter-finals ====
2 September 2018; Section B Quarter-final	Dicksboro	3–21 1–16	Rower–Inistioge	Gowran; Referee: G Rafter

4 September 2018; Section B Quarter-final	Ballyhale Shamrocks	5–21 3–19	St Patrick's	Dunmore; Referee: C Everard

==== Relegation Play-off ====
5 September 2018; Section B Relegation	Clara	5–21 3–19	Tullaroan	Freshford; Referee: P Burke

==== Semi-finals ====
15 September 2018; Section B Semi-final	O'Loughlin Gaels	2–16 1–17	Ballyhale Shamrocks	Clara; Referee: J Walsh

16 September 2018; Section B Semi-final	James Stephens	1–13 0–18	Dicksboro	St John's Park; Referee: M Flynn

==== Final ====
23 September 2018; Section B Final	O'Loughlin Gaels	1–09 1–18	Dicksboro	Freshford; Referee: P Dunphy

=== Section A ===
==== Round 1 ====
8 September 2018; Section A Round 1	Dunnamaggin	1–14 0–13	Kilmacow	Mullinavat; Referee: J Walsh

8 September 2018; Section A Round 1	Galmoy	2–15 0–13	Barrow Rangers	Freshford; Referee: P Dunphy

8 September 2018; Section A Round 1	Graignamanagh	0–13 0–15	Piltown	Ballyhale; Referee: J Bennett

8 September 2018; Section A Round 1	Blacks & Whites	1–10 4–15	Emeralds	Clara; Referee: S Cleere

9 September 2018; Section A Round 1	Cloneen	3–03 4–15	Conahy Shamrocks	Coon; Referee: P Burke

9 September 2018; Section A Round 1	Slieverue	1–18 1–13	Windgap	Piltown; Referee: J Kennedy

==== Quarter-finals ====
22 September 2018; Section A Quarter-final	Piltown	2–20 1–11	Galmoy	Callan; Referee: G Rafter

22 September 2018; Section A Quarter-final	Dunnamaggin	1–14 1–11	Conahy Shamrocks	Palmerstown; Referee: J Walsh

23 September 2018; Section A Quarter-final	Slieverue	2–15 3–22	Emeralds	Danesfort; Referee: A Barcoe

=== Combined Play-offs ===
==== Semi-finals ====
7 October 2018; Semi-final	Dunnamaggin	2–18 1–14	Dicksboro	Nowlan Park; Referee: C Everard

7 October 2018; Semi-final	Piltown	4–14 0–16	Slieverue	Nowlan Park; Referee: K Cananvan

==== Final ====
21 October 2018
Final
Dunnamaggin
1–16 2–08
Piltown
Nowlan Park
Referee: O Kenny
Thomas Maher (0-6, frees); Ronan Coffey (0-4); Willie Phelan (1-0, penalty); Darren Fitzpatarick, John Fitzpatrick (0-2 each); Michael Cody, Adam Fitzpatrick (0-1 each).

John Kenny (0-6, five frees, one 65); Peter McCarthy (1-0, penalty); Kevin Brophy (1-

0); Cian Kinsella, Ronan Ryan (0-1 each).
