= 2017 Kilkenny Junior Hurling Championship =

- Dates: 23 August– 14 October 2017
- Teams: 20
- Sponsor: JJ Kavanagh and Sons
- Champions: John Locke's (4th title)
- Runners-up: O'Loughlin Gaels
- Relegated: Erin's Own

The 2017 Kilkenny Junior Hurling Championship was the 107th staging of the competition since its establishment by the Kilkenny County Board in 1905 and ran from 23 August to 14 October 2017.

The competition consisted of 20 teams divided into sections A and B. Section A comprised 12 junior-grade clubs represented by their first-team panels. Section B comprised eight senior/intermediate-grade clubs represented by their second-team panels. Three teams from Section A (quarter-final winners) and one from Section B (final winner) advanced to the combined semi-final stage.

John Locke's defeated O'Loughlin Gaels by 1–17 to 0–19 in the final on 14 October 2017 at Nowlan Park, Kilkenny. As 2017 junior champions they were promoted to the 2018 Kilkenny Intermediate Hurling Championship.

Tullaroan defeated Erin's Own in the Section B relegation play-off by 4–15 to 3–11, preserving their place in the top junior grade. The losing side were demoted to the Kilkenny Junior A Hurling Championship for 2018.

== Teams ==
=== Section A ===
- Barrow Rangers
- Blacks and Whites
- Cloneen
- Conahy Shamrocks (Note: relegated from 2016 Kilkenny Intermediate Hurling Championship)
- Emeralds
- Galmoy
- Graiguenamanagh
- John Locke's
- Kilmacow
- Piltown
- Slieverue
- Windgap

=== Section B ===
- Ballyhale Shamrocks
- Clara
- Dicksboro
- Erin's Own
- James Stephens
- O'Loughlin Gaels
- Rower-Inistioge (Note: promoted from 2016 Kilkenny Junior A Hurling Championship)
- Tullaroan

== Results ==
=== Section B ===
==== Round 1 ====
23 August 2017; Section B Round 1	Erin's Own	1–06 0–17	Ballyhale Shamrocks	Castlecomer; Referee: E Larkin

26 August 2017; Section B Round 1	James Stephens	1–26 2–14	Tullaroan	Kilmanagh; Referee: S Delaney

==== Quarter-finals ====
2 September 2017; Section B Quarter-final	James Stephens	0–15 3–18	Dicksboro	St John's Park; Referee: P Burke

10 September 2017; Section B Quarter-final	Ballyhale Shamrocks	1–13 2–09	Rower–Inistioge	Thomastown; Referee: R Dowling

==== Relegation Play-off ====
4 September 2017; Section B Relegation	Erin's Own	3–11 4–15	Tullaroan	St John's Park; Referee: E Larkin

==== Semi-finals ====
15 September 2017; Section B Semi-final	O'Loughlin Gaels	1–21 1–20	Ballyhale Shamrocks	Dunmore; Referee: S McMahon

17 September 2017; Section B Semi-final	Dicksboro	2–13 1–17	Clara	St John's Park; Referee: B Donohoe

==== Final ====
24 September 2017; Section B Final	O'Loughlin Gaels	1–15 0–17	Clara	Bennettsbridge; Referee: J Fitzgerald

=== Section A ===
==== Round 1 ====
16 September 2017; Section A Round 1	Blacks and Whites	1–13 1–08	Barrow Rangers	Graignamanagh; Referee: O Kenny

17 September 2017; Section A Round 1	John Locke’s	0–16 0–09	Kilmacow	Hugginstown; Referee: J Bennett

17 September 2017; Section A Round 1	Cloneen	0–03 5–22	Emeralds	Ballyragget; Referee: G Rafter

17 September 2017; Section A Round 1	Galmoy	1–19 0–16	Windgap	Kilmanagh; Referee: S Delaney

17 September 2017; Section A Round 1	Slieverue	2–15 1–15	Conahy Shamrocks	Bennettsbridge; Referee: J McCormack

17 September 2017; Section A Round 1	Piltown	2–18 1–11	Graignamanagh	Glenmore; Referee: R Byrne

==== Quarter-finals ====
23 September 2017; Section A Quarter-final	John Locke's	2–21 1–13	Galmoy	Tullaroan; Referee: P Burke

23 September 2017; Section A Quarter-final	Emeralds	1–14 2–13	Slieverue	Danesfort; Referee: J Bennett

23 September 2017; Section A Quarter-final	Piltown	1–15 0–12	Blacks and Whites	Ballyhale; Referee: M O'Sullivan

=== Combined Play-offs ===
==== Semi-finals ====
1 October 2017; Semi-final	O'Loughlin Gaels	2–17 2–09	Piltown	Nowlan Park; Referee: C Everard

1 October 2017; Semi-final	Slieverue	2–11 4–16	John Locke’s	Nowlan Park; Referee: G Rafter

==== Final ====
14 October 2017; Final	John Locke’s	1–17 0–19	O'Loughlin Gaels	Nowlan Park; Referee: J Kennedy
14 October 2017; Final	James Power (0-10); Dan McCormack (1-2); Shane Bergin (0-2); Paddy Kennedy, Ryan Bergin, Conor Murphy (0-1 each)		John Doyle (0-13); Alan Geoghegan, Danny Lenihan (0-2 each); Niall Bergin, Brian Dowling (0-1 each).	Nowlan Park; Referee: J Kennedy
