= 2024 Kilkenny Premier Junior Hurling Championship =

- Dates: 8 September – 2 November 2024
- Teams: 22
- Sponsor: JJ Kavanagh & Sons
- Champions: St Lachtain's (3rd title); Críomhthann Bergin (captain); Steven Farrell (manager)
- Runners-up: Windgap; Niall Walsh (captain); Pat Robinson (manager)

Tournament statistics
- Matches played: 21
- Goals scored: 62 (2.95 per match)
- Points scored: 408 (19.43 per match)

The 2024 Kilkenny Premier Junior Hurling Championship was the third staging of the Kilkenny Premier Junior Hurling Championship and the 114th staging overall of a championship for the junior-ranking hurling teams in Kilkenny. The championship ran from 8 September to 2 November 2024.

The final was played on 2 November 2024 at UPMC Nowlan Park in Kilkenny, between St Lachtain's and Windgap, in what was their first ever meeting in the final. St Lachtain's won the match by 2-15 to 1-12 to claim their third championship title overall and a first title in 31 years.

== Participating teams ==
Section A	Section B
Barrow Rangers; Cloneen; Emeralds; Galmoy; Graignamanagh; John Locke's; Kilmacow; Piltown; Slieverue; St Lachtain's; St Patrick's; Windgap	Ballyhale Shamrocks; Clara; Dicksboro; Erin's Own; James Stephens; Lisdowney; Mooncoin; O'Loughlin Gaels; Rower-Inistioge; Thomastown

== Section A ==
=== Section A Round 1 ===
14 September 2024 Round 1	Piltown	3-18 - 2-19	St Patrick's	Tullaroan Grounds

14 September 2024 Round 1	John Locke's	0-11 - 3-18	Graignamanagh	Carrickshock Grounds

14 September 2024 Round 1	Cloneen	1-13 - 0-20	Emeralds	Muckalee Grounds

14 September 2024 Round 1	Barrow Rangers	0-17 - 1-10	Kilmacow	Dunnamaggin Grounds

=== Section A Round 2 ===
22 September 2024 Round 2	Galmoy	0-28 - 0-25	Piltown	Tullaroan Grounds

22 September 2024 Round 2	Slieverue	2-10 - 2-20	Graignamanagh	Carrickshock Grounds

=== Section A quarter-finals ===
- St Lachtain's and Windgap received byes to this round as a result of being the league finalists.

5 October 2024 Quarter-final	Windgap	3-19 - 1-18	Graignamanagh	Inistioge Grounds

5 October 2024 Quarter-final	Emeralds	1-20 - 1-17	Barrow Rangers	St Patrick's Park

6 October 2024 Quarter-final	St Lachtain's	4-14 - 1-19	Galmoy	Jim Maher Memorial Park

== Section B ==
=== Section B preliminary round ===
8 September 2024 Preliminary round	Clara	2-10 - 2-17	Dicksboro	Bennettsbridge Grounds

8 September 2024 Preliminary round	Mooncoin	2-14 - 2-17	Ballyhale Shamrocks	Mooncoin Grounds

=== Section B quarter-finals ===
15 September 2024 Quarter-final	O'Loughlin Gaels	4-24 - 0-10	Ballyhale Shamrocks	Danesfort Grounds

15 September 2024 Quarter-final	James Stephens	2-21 - 1-17	Dicksboro	Muckalee Grounds

15 September 2024 Quarter-final	Erin's Own	3-14 - 1-19	Lisdowney	Polo Grounds

15 September 2024 Quarter-final	Thomastown	3-22 - 1-14	Rower-Inistioge	Dr Tierney Park

=== Section B semi-finals ===
22 September 2024 Semi-final	O'Loughlin Gaels	2-16 - 0-11	Erin's Own	Polo Grounds

22 September 2024 Semi-final	James Stephens	1-22 - 2-15	Thomastown	Bennettsbridge Grounds
		Report

=== Section B final ===
28 September 2024 Final	James Stephens	1-17 - 2-13	O'Loughlin Gaels	Danesfort Grounds
		Report

== Combined section ==
=== Semi-finals ===
19 October 2024 Semi-final	James Stephens	1-14 - 0-27	St Lachtain's	UPMC Nowlan Park
	M Drennan (0-7, 0-6 frees); S Deely (1-1); O Bateman, D Walton (0-2 each); L Rafter, J O’Keeffe (0-1 each)	Report	C O’Leary (0-9, 0-6 frees); J Maher (0-5); S Donnelly (0-3); B Kennedy, M Donnelly, D Maher (0-2 each); B Quinn, P Killeen, C Hickey, A Rafter (0-1 each)

19 October 2024 Semi-final	Windgap	2-25 - 0-22	Emeralds	UPMC Nowlan Park
	E Landy (0-14, 0-9 frees); J Culleton (1-2); C Doyle (1-0); J Doyle, S Purcell (0-3 each); J Power (0-2); P Grace (0-1)	Report	D Queally (0-14, 0-9 frees and 0-2 ‘65’s); K Doyle, S Burke, G Troy (0-2 each); P Phelan, JJ McLoughlin (0-1 each)

=== Final ===
2 November 2024 Final	St Lachtain's	2-15 - 1-12	Windgap	UPMC Nowlan Park
	C O'Leary 1-7, P Killeen 1-0, J Maher 0-3, D Maher 0-1, Alexander Rafter 0-1, B Kennedy 0-1, L Hickey 0-1, Alan Rafter 0-1.		E Landy 1-3, J Power 0-4, S Purcell 0-2, B Power 0-2, J Doyle 0-1.	Referee: E Maher (Mullinavat)
