= 2023 Kilkenny Premier Junior Hurling Championship =

- Dates: 19 September – 21 October 2023
- Teams: 22
- Sponsor: JJ Kavanagh and Sons
- Champions: Tullogher-Rosbercon (6th title)
- Runners-up: St. Lachtain's

The 2023 Kilkenny Premier Junior Hurling Championship was the 113th staging of the competition since its establishment by the Kilkenny County Board in 1905 and ran from 19 September to 21 October 2023.

The competition consisted of 22 teams divided into sections A and B. Section A comprised 13 junior-grade clubs represented by their first-team panels. Section B comprised nine senior/intermediate-grade clubs represented by their second-team panels. Three teams from Section A (quarter-final winners) and one from Section B (final winner) advanced to the combined semi-final stage.

Tullogher–Rosbercon defeated St. Lachtain's by 1–19 to 0–17 in the final on 21 October 2020 at Nowlan Park, Kilkenny. As 2023 junior champions they were promoted to the 2024 Kilkenny Intermediate Hurling Championship.

== Teams ==
=== Section A ===
- Barrow Rangers
- Cloneen
- Emeralds
- Galmoy
- Graignamanagh
- John Locke's
- Kilmacow
- Piltown
- Slieverue
- St Lachtain's (Note: relegated from 2022 Kilkenny Intermediate Hurling Championship)
- St Patrick's
- Tullogher–Rosbercon
- Windgap

=== Section B ===
- Ballyhale Shamrocks
- Clara
- Dicksboro
- Erin's Own
- James Stephens
- Lisdowney
- Mooncoin
- Rower–Inistioge
- Thomastown (Note: promoted from 2022 Kilkenny Junior A Hurling Championship)

== Results ==
=== Section B ===
==== Round 1 ====
19 September 2023; Section B Round 1	Rower–Inistioge	0–15 1–13	Ballyhale Shamrocks	Mooncoin; Referee: R Dowling

==== Quarter-finals ====
24 September 2023; Section B Quarter-final	Dicksboro	conceded to Dicksboro	Ballyhale Shamrocks	Windgap; Referee: J O'Dwyer

24 September 2023; Section B Quarter-final	James Stephens	0–09 0–07	Thomastown	Skeoughvosteen; Referee: A Barcoe

24 September 2023; Section B Quarter-final	Lisdowney	2–28 4–13	Clara	Jenkinstown; Referee: G Rafter

26 September 2023; Section B Quarter-final	Mooncoin	0–18 1–11	Erin's Own	Dunmore; Referee: K Canavan

==== Semi-finals ====
30 September 2023; Section B Semi-final	Lisdowney	0–08 2–17	Dicksboro	Tullaroan; Referee: S McMahon

1 October 2023; Section B Semi-final	James Stephens	1–20 3–07	Mooncoin	Piltown; Referee: G Quilty

==== Final ====
7 October 2023; Section B Final	Dicksboro	1–19 0–11	James Stephens	St John's Park; Referee: M Flynn

=== Section A ===
==== Round 1 ====
24 September 2023; Section A Round 1	Kilmacow	0–11 1–15	Slieverue	Piltown; Referee: M Flynn

24 September 2023; Section A Round 1	John Locke's	0–04 2–18	Graignamanagh	Inistioge; Referee: P Dunphy

24 September 2023; Section A Round 1	Galmoy	1–19 1–12	Cloneen	Castlecomer; Referee: S McMahon

==== Round 2 ====
30 September 2023; Section A Round 2	Tullogher–Rosbercon	3–13 0–07	Graignamanagh	Piltown; Referee: T Morley

30 September 2023; Section A Round 2	Emeralds	2–11 0–18	Galmoy	Ballyragget; Referee: C Everard

1 October 2023; Section A Round 2	Slieverue	1–16 1–18	St Patrick's	Gowran; Referee: S Cleere

1 October 2023; Section A Round 2	Barrow Rangers	1–14 3–15	Piltown	Dunnamaggin; Referee: K Canavan

==== Quarter-finals ====
7 October 2023; Section A Quarter-final	Windgap	0–21 1–14	Piltown	Mooncoin; Referee: G Quilty

7 October 2023; Section A Quarter-final	Emeralds	2–15 3–22	Tullogher–Rosbercon	Clara; Referee: E Hayes

8 October 2023; Section A Quarter-final	St Lachtain's	2–12 1–11	St Patrick's	Jenkinstown; Referee: B Fox

=== Combined Play-offs ===
==== Semi-finals ====
14 October 2023; Semi-final	Dicksboro	1–21 4–20	Tullogher–Rosbercon	Nowlan Park; Referee: P Burke

14 October 2023; Semi-final	St Lachtain's	4–11 1–18	Windgap	Nowlan Park; Referee: D Hughes

==== Final ====
21 October 2023; Final	St Lachtain's	0–17 1–19	Tullogher–Rosbercon	Nowlan Park; Referee: J O'Dwyer
21 October 2023; Final	Cathal O'Leary (0-11, seven frees and one '65), Darragh Maher (0-3), James Maher, John Fitzpatrick, Paul White (0-1 each)		Cian O'Donoghue (0-7, six frees), Danny Glennon (1-2), Walter Walsh, Marty Murphy (0-3 each), Conor Hennessy, Jason Shiely, Jamie Lyng, Lar Murphy (0-1 each)	Nowlan Park; Referee: J O'Dwyer
