= 2020 Kilkenny Junior Hurling Championship =

- Dates: 19 August – 3 October 2020
- Teams: 20
- Sponsor: JJ Kavanagh and Sons
- Champions: Conahy Shamrocks (3rd title)
- Runners-up: Dicksboro

The 2020 Kilkenny Junior Hurling Championship was the 110th staging of the competition since its establishment by the Kilkenny County Board in 1905 and ran from 19 August to 3 October 2020.

The competition consisted of 20 teams divided into sections A and B. Section A comprised 13 junior-grade clubs represented by their first-team panels. Section B comprised seven senior/intermediate-grade clubs represented by their second-team panels. Three teams from Section A (quarter-final winners) and one from Section B (final winner) advanced to the combined semi-final stage.

Conahy Shamrocks defeated Dicksboro by 3–14 to 0–19 (after extra-time) in the final on 3 October 2020 at Nowlan Park. As 2020 junior champions they were promoted to the 2021 Kilkenny Intermediate Hurling Championship.

== Teams ==
=== Section A ===
- Barrow Rangers
- Blacks & Whites
- Cloneen
- Conahy Shamrocks
- Emeralds
- Galmoy
- Graignamanagh
- Kilmacow
- Mooncoin (Note: relegated from 2019 Kilkenny Intermediate Hurling Championship)
- Piltown
- Slieverue
- Tullogher–Rosbercon
- Windgap

=== Section B ===
- Ballyhale Shamrocks
- Clara
- Dicksboro
- Erin's Own (Note: promoted from 2019 Kilkenny Junior A Hurling Championship)
- James Stephens
- Rower–Inistioge
- St Patrick's

== Results ==
=== Section B ===
==== Quarter-finals ====
| 19 August 2020; Section B Quarter-final | Erin's Own | 4–14 1–14 | St Patrick's | Ballyragget; Referee: J Guinan |

| 30 August 2020; Section B Quarter-final | Ballyhale Shamrocks | 1–10 3–18 | Clara | Bennettsbridge; Referee: P Bowden |

| 30 August 2020; Section B Quarter-final | Dicksboro | 5–26 1–12 | Emeralds | Danesfort; Referee: J O'Dwyer |

==== Semi-finals ====
| 5 September 2020; Section B Semi-final | James Stephens | 3–13 0–20 | Clara | Jenkinstown; Referee: E Mansfield |

| 6 September 2020; Section B Semi-final | Dicksboro | 2–24 2–12 | Erin's Own | Gowran; Referee: C Tobin |

==== Final ====
| 13 September 2020; Section B Final | James Stephens | 2–09 3–20 | Dicksboro | St John's Park; Referee: P Dunphy |

=== Section A ===
==== Round 1 ====
| 29 August 2020; Section A Round 1 | Barrow Rangers | 1–18 0–16 | Kilmacow | Thomastown; Referee: S McMahon |

==== Round 2 ====
| 5 September 2020; Section A Round 2 | Tullogher–Rosbercon | 4–14 0–11 | Barrow Rangers | Thomastown; Referee: J O'Dwyer |

| 5 September 2020; Section A Round 2 | Piltown | 4–16 1–17 | Slieverue | Mooncoin; Referee: E Hayes |

| 5 September 2020; Section A Round 2 | Conahy Shamrocks | 4–07 2–10 | Cloneen | Muckalee; Referee: S Murphy |

| 5 September 2020; Section A Round 2 | Graignamanagh | 0–10 1–19 | Blacks & Whites | Gowran; Referee: P Bowden |

| 6 September 2020; Section A Round 2 | Windgap | 0–16 1–20 | Emeralds | Kilmanagh; Referee: G Rafter |

| 6 September 2020; Section A Round 2 | Galmoy | 0–17 1–24 | Mooncoin | Danesfort; Referee: S McMahon |

==== Quarter-finals ====
| 13 September 2020; Section A Quarter-final | Mooncoin | 2–12 1–16 | Conahy Shamrocks | Thomastown; Referee: C Everard |

| 13 September 2020; Section A Quarter-final | Piltown | 1–17 2–11 | Blacks & Whites | Ballyhale; Referee: D Hughes |

| 13 September 2020; Section A Quarter-final | Tullogher–Rosbercon | 2–15 2–16 | Emeralds | Gowran; Referee: S Delaney |

=== Combined Play-offs ===
==== Semi-finals ====
| 19 September 2020; Semi-final | Emeralds | 1–15 1–18 | Conahy Shamrocks | Nowlan Park; Referee: G Quilty |

| 19 September 2020; Semi-final | Piltown | 2–09 2–22 | Dicksboro | Nowlan Park; Referee: C Everard |

==== Final ====
| 3 October 2020; Final | Conahy Shamrocks | 3–14 0–19 | Dicksboro | Nowlan Park; Referee: O Beehan |
| 3 October 2020; Final | James Bergin 2-7 (0-5fs), Kieran Mooney 1-2 (0-1f), Tom Phelan 0-2, Eddie Delaney 0-1, Darragh Dooley 0-1 and Alan Healy 0-1. | | David Ryan 0-10 (0-6fs), Padraic Moylan 0-3 (0-1fs), Sean Boyd 0-3, Aran Murphy 0-1, Paul O'Flynn 0-1, Joe Sheehan 0-1. | Nowlan Park; Referee: O Beehan |
