= 1976 Kilkenny Senior Hurling Championship =

Annual hurling competition season

- Dates: 26 June – 24 October 1976
- Teams: 11
- Champions: James Stephens (5th title); Liam O'Brien (captain)
- Runners-up: Rower-Inistioge

Tournament statistics
- Matches played: 29
- Goals scored: 125 (4.31 per match)
- Points scored: 618 (21.31 per match)

The 1976 Kilkenny Senior Hurling Championship was the 82nd staging of the Kilkenny Senior Hurling Championship since its establishment by the Kilkenny County Board in 1887. The championship ran from 26 June to 24 October 1976.

James Stephens entered the championship as the defending champions.

The final was played on 24 October 1976 at Nowlan Park in Kilkenny, between James Stephens and Rower-Inistioge, in what was their first ever meeting in the final. James Stephens won the match by 2–14 to 0–13 to claim their fifth championship title overall and a second consecutive title.

== North group ==
=== North group table ===
Semi-finalists

Team	Matches				Score			Pts
Team	Pld	W	D	L	For	Against	Diff	Pts
James Stephens	5	5	0	0	103	58	45	10
Fenians	5	3	0	2	102	65	37	6
Muckalee/Ballyfoyle	5	3	0	2	86	72	14	6
Galmoy	5	2	0	3	76	92	-16	4
Erin's Own	5	2	0	3	69	112	-43	4
St Lachtain's	5	0	0	5	58	90	-32	0

=== North group results ===
26 June 1976 Round 1	Fenians	2-11 - 3-09	Muckalee/Ballyfoyle Rangers	Nowlan Park
	B Fitzpatrick 1-5, B Watson 1-0, P Delaney 0-2, G Henderson 0-1, P Henderson 0-1.		T Moran 2-1, D Coonan 1-1, B Morrissey 0-3, John Moran 0-1, M Coonan 0-1, J Brennan 0-1, Jim Moran 0-1.

27 June 1976 Round 1	James Stephens	2-11 - 2-06	Galmoy	St Patrick's Park
	L O'Brien 0-5, G Tyrrell 1-1, J Dwyer 1-0, J Hennessy 0-2, M Crotty 0-1, M Neary 0-1, D Murphy 0-1.		W Phelan 1-3, W Harte 1-2, J Doherty 0-1.

27 June 1976 Round 1	Erin's Own	1-16 - 2-08	St Lachtain's	St Patrick's Park
				Referee: T Gregg (O'Loughlin Gaels)

10 July 1976 Round 2	James Stephens	2-10 - 1-07	Fenians	Nowlan Park
	M Taylor 1-1, M Leahy 1-0, L O'Brien 0-3, B Cody 0-2, M Crotty 0-1, J O'Dwyer 0-1, J McCormack 0-1.		B Watson 1-0, B Fitzpatrick 0-3, J Ryan 0-2, M Garrett 0-1, P Delaney 0-1.

11 July 1976 Round 2	Erin's Own	1-11 - 2-10	Galmoy	Nowlan Park
	S Coogan 1-5, M Brennan 0-2, T Brennan 0-1, M Coogan 0-1.		J Phelan 2-0, W Phelan 0-6, W Harte 0-2, L Harte 0-1, S Delaney 0-1.

11 July 1976 Round 2	St Lachtain's	2-06 - 4-09	Muckalee/Ballyfoyle Rangers	Nowlan Park
	G McCarthy 1-4, M McCarthy 1-1, P Butler 0-1.		T Moran 3-0, B Morrissey 0-4, T Maher 1-0, M Coonan 0-2, J Moran 0-1, M Nolan 0-1, J Brennan 0-1.

25 July 1976 Round 3	Erin's Own	0-08 - 1-29	James Stephens	St Patrick's Park

25 July 1976 Round 3	Galmoy	1-05 - 2-10	Muckalee/Ballyfoyle Rangers	Nowlan Park

1 August 1976 Round 3	Fenians	2-10 - 1-10	St Lachtain's	Nowlan Park

13 August 1976 Round 4	Muckalee/Ballyfoyle Rangers	3-06 - 4-05	Erin's Own	Nowlan Park

22 August 1976 Round 4	Fenians	4-12 - 1-04	Galmoy	St Patrick's Park
	J Ryan 2-1, P Delaney 1-2, B Fitzpatrick 0-5, J Henderson 1-1, J Moriarty 0-2, P Henderson 0-1.		B Harte 1-1, W Phelan 0-2, M Lonergan 0-1.

22 August 1976 Round 4	James Stephens	2-14 - 0-12	St Lachtain's	St Patrick's Park

28 August 1976 Round 5	James Stephens	1-15 - 1-13	Muckalee/Ballyfoyle Rangers	Nowlan Park

29 August 1976 Round 5	Fenians	5-20 - 2-05	Erin's Own	Nowlan Park

29 August 1976 Round 5	Galmoy	7-12 - 2-15	St Lachtain's	Nowlan Park

=== North group playoff ===
Playoff	Fenians	2-17 - 4-01	Muckalee/Ballyfoyle Rangers

== South group ==
=== South group table ===
Semi-finalists

Team	Matches				Score			Pts
Team	Pld	W	D	L	For	Against	Diff	Pts
Rower-Inistioge	4	4	0	0	89	47	42	8
Ballyhale Shamrocks	4	2	1	1	78	48	42	5
Mooncoin	4	2	0	2	70	78	-8	4
Bennettsbridge	4	1	1	2	59	52	7	3
Windgap	4	0	0	4	46	117	-71	0

=== South group results ===
26 June 1976 Round 1	Mooncoin	5-08 - 0-15	Windgap	Piltown Grounds
				Referee: E Black

27 June 1976 Round 1	Bennettsbridge	1-07 - 0-10	Ballyhale Shamrocks	Thomastown Grounds
	T Dowling 1-0, J Kinsella 0-2, W Kennedy 0-2, J Dowling 0-1, P Kiely 0-1.		G Fennelly 0-6, M Fennelly 0-2, S Reid 0-1, B Fennelly 0-1.

10 July 1976 Round 2	Bennettsbridge	0-07 - 2-12	Rower-Inistioge	Thomastown Grounds

11 July 1976 Round 2	Windgap	1-05 - 5-18	Ballyhale Shamrocks	Piltown Grounds

24 July 1976 Round 3	Rower-Inistioge	3-21 - 1-15	Windgap	Thomastown Grounds

25 July 1976 Round 3	Ballyhale Shamrocks	3-16 - 4-04	Mooncoin	Mullinavat Grounds

22 August 1976 Round 4	Bennettsbridge	1-08 - 2-10	Mooncoin	Thomastown Grounds

22 August 1976 Round 4	Rower-Inistioge	1-11 - 1-07	Ballyhale Shamrocks	Thomastown Grounds

29 August 1976 Round 5	Bennettsbridge	7-10 - 1-05	Windgap	Thomastown Grounds

29 August 1976 Round 5	Mooncoin	3-06 - 3-18	Rower-Inistioge	Mullinavat Grounds

== Knockout stage ==
=== Semi-finals ===
3 October 1976 Semi-final	James Stephens	2-14 - 3-08	Ballyhale Shamrocks	Nowlan Park
	J O'Brien 2-0, L O'Brien 0-6, M Crotty 0-3, J Hennessy 0-3, B Cody 0-1, M Taylor 0-1.		G Fennelly 2-2, S Reid 1-3, K Fennelly 0-1, O Harrington 0-1, D Connolly 0-1.

3 October 1976 Semi-final	Rower-Inistioge	4-12 - 1-07	Fenians	Nowlan Park
	E Keher 2-4, T Waters 1-1, M Lyng 1-1, P Kavanagh 0-3, J Lyng 0-2, G Murphy 0-1.		B Fitzpatrick 1-5, G Henderson 0-1, P Delaney 0-1.

=== Final ===
24 October 1976 Final	James Stephens	2-14 - 0-13	Rower-Inistioge	Nowlan Park
	L O'Brien 0-5, M Crotty 0-5, J O'Brien 1-0, M Leahy 1-0, D McCormack 0-2, J Hennessy 0-1, B Cody 0-1.		E Keher 0-6, J Lyng 0-2, T Waters 0-2, P Kavanagh 0-2, S Lyster 0-1.
