= Kilkenny Intermediate Hurling League =

- Current season or competition: 2025 Kilkenny Intermediate Hurling League
- Code: Hurling
- Founded: 1992; 33 years ago
- Region: Kilkenny (GAA)
- Trophy: Pat Tierney Memorial Cup
- No. of teams: 12
- Title holders: James Stephens (1st title)
- Most titles: Thomastown (7 titles)
- Sponsors: Michael Lyng Motors
- Official website: website

The Kilkenny Intermediate Hurling League is an annual competition organised by the Kilkenny County Board of the Gaelic Athletic Association since 1992 for the second tier of hurling teams in the county of Kilkenny, Ireland. Teams compete for the Pat Tierney Memorial Cup and the competition is played in advance of the Kilkenny Intermediate Hurling Championship.

The league format consists of 12 teams divided into two groups of six in which each team plays each other once. The top team in each group qualifies for the league final. The second-placed team in each group qualifies to compete for a subsidiary title in the shield final.

The top two teams in each group qualify for the quarter-final stage of the subsequent Kilkenny Intermediate Hurling Championship while the remaining eight teams compete in the first round.

James Stephens are the current title holders following their win over Danesfort in the 2025 final. It was their first intermediate league title.

Dunnamaggin defeated Young Irelands in the 2025 shield final.

== Records ==
=== League Winners ===
==== 7 Titles ====
- Thomastown: 1994, 2017, 2019, 2020, 2021, 2022, 2023

==== 3 Titles ====
- Bennettsbridge: 1995, 1998, 2015
- Clara: 1996, 1997, 2012
- Mullinavat: 2004, 2010, 2014

==== 2 Titles ====
- St Martin's: 2000, 2002
- Erin's Own: 2007, 2008
- Rower–Inistioge: 2009, 2011

==== 1 Title ====
- Mooncoin: 1992
- O'Loughlin Gaels: 1993
- Dunnamaggin: 1999
- St Lachtain's: 2001
- Carrickshock: 2003
- Dicksboro: 2005
- Emeralds: 2006
- St Patrick's: 2013
- Tullaroan: 2016
- John Locke's: 2018
- Lisdowney: 2024
- James Stephens: 2025

=== League Finals ===
Year	Winner	Scoreline	Runner-up
1992	Mooncoin	2–10 0–04	Young Irelands
1993	O’Loughlin Gaels	1–14 2–10	Mooncoin
1994	Thomastown	3–15 2–17	Carrickshock
1995	Bennettsbridge	3–11 0–10	Dunnamaggin
1996	Clara	1–09 1–08	O'Loughlin Gaels
1997	Clara	1–12 1–08	Bennettsbridge
1998	Bennettsbridge	2–14 1–12	Thomastown
1999	Dunnamaggin	1–15 2–10	St Lachtain’s
2000	St Martin's	1–13 2–09	Dunnamaggin
2001	St Lachtain’s	1–14 1–11	Mullinavat
2002	St Martin's	2–13 1–10	Graignamanagh
2003	Carrickshock	4–14 1–12	Erin's Own
2004	Mullinavat	1–13 1–10	Graignamanagh
2005 (replay)	Dicksboro	(1–07 0–10); 0–12 1–08	Galmoy
2006	Emeralds	3–06 0–10	Mullinavat
2007	Erin's Own	1–12 0–13	Glenmore
2008	Erin's Own	3–16 0–14	Conahy Shamrocks
2009	Rower-Inistioge	1–24 0–11	Danesfort
2010	Mullinavat	2–10 0–11	Danesfort
2011	Rower Inistioge	2–16 1–14	Danesfort
2012	Clara	2–15 0–15	St Lachtain's
2013	St Patrick’s	3–10 2–10	Rower–Inistioge
2014	Mullinavat	2–16 0–18	St Patrick’s
2015	Bennettsbridge	2–20 2–15	Tullaroan
2016	Tullaroan	5–16 1–16	Carrickshock
2017	Thomastown	2–21 1–22	Tullaroan
2018	John Locke's	2–14 1–16	Tullaroan
2019	Thomastown	3–19 3–18	Tullaroan
2020	Thomastown	2–18 2–11	Dunnamaggin
2021	Thomastown	1–22 2–16	Glenmore
2022	Thomastown	2–20 1–18	Danesfort
2023	Thomastown	0–18 1–11	Lisdowney
2024	Lisdowney	3–17 2–19	Young Irelands
2025	James Stephens	1–23 0–17	Danesfort
