= 2022 Kilkenny Premier Junior Hurling Championship =

- Dates: 17 September – 23 October 2022
- Sponsor: JJ Kavanagh and Sons
- Champions: Blacks and Whites (4th title); Paul Murphy (captain)
- Runners-up: Windgap

The 2022 Kilkenny Premier Junior Hurling Championship was the inaugural staging of the Kilkenny Premier Junior Hurling Championship and the 112th staging overall of a championship for the junior-ranking hurling teams in Kilkenny. The championship draw took place on 27 February 2022. The championship ran from 17 September to 23 October 2022.

The final was played on 23 October 2022 at UPMC Nowlan Park in Kilkenny, between Blacks and Whites and Windgap, in what was their first ever meeting in the final. Blacks and Whites won the match by 1-17 to 0-17 to claim their fourth championship title overall and a first title in 13 years.

== Team changes ==
=== To Championship ===
Relegated from the Kilkenny Intermediate Hurling Championship

- John Locke's

=== From Championship ===
Promoted to the Kilkenny Intermediate Hurling Championship

- Mooncoin

== Results ==
=== Semi-finals ===
8 October 2022 Semi-final	Piltown	1-21 - 3-16	Blacks and Whites	UPMC Nowlan Park

8 October 2022 Semi-final	Dicksboro	2-21 - 1-24; Penalties: 2-4	Windgap	UPMC Nowlan Park

=== Final ===
23 October 2022 Final	Windgap	0-17 - 1-17	Blacks and Whites	UPMC Nowlan Park
	E Landy 0-5, J Doyle 0-5, J Power 0-3, A O'Shea 0-2, J Culleton 0-1, N Walsh 0-1.		R Murphy 0-9, J Byrne 0-4, E Foley 1-0, S Byrne 0-1, S Doyle 0-1, P Murphy 0-1, E Murphy 0-1.	Referee: E Hayes (Thomastown)
