= Kilkenny Junior Football Championship =

Junior grade Gaelic football championship in Kilkenny

- Irish: Craobh Peile Shóisearach Chill Chainnigh
- Code: Gaelic football
- Founded: 1905
- Region: Kilkenny (GAA)
- No. of teams: 9
- Title holders: Graignamanagh (th title)
- Sponsors: J. J. Kavanagh & Sons
- Official website: Kilkenny GAA

The Kilkenny Junior Football Championship (known for sponsorship reasons as the J. J. Kavanagh & Sons Junior Football Championship and abbreviated to the Kilkenny JFC) is an annual Gaelic football competition organised by the Kilkenny County Board of the Gaelic Athletic Association and contested by the junior-graded clubs in the county of Kilkenny in Ireland. It is the third tier overall in the entire Kilkenny football championship system.

Graignamanagh are the reigning champions, having beaten Bennettsbridge by 0–11 to 1–6 in the 2024 final.

== List of finals ==
Year	Winners	Score	Runners-up	Score
2017	Lisdowney	2-09	Graigue-Ballycallan	2-08
2018				
2019	Young Irelands	1-08	Barrow Rangers	0-06
2020	Graigue-Ballycallan	2-07	Carrickshock	0-10
2021	Carrickshock	4-04	Windgap	0-08
2022	Barrow Rangers	2-05	Graignamanagh	2-04
2023	St. Patrick's	2-09	Bennettsbridge	0-13
2024	Graignamanagh	0-11	Bennettsbridge	1-06
