= Marty Murphy =

Irish hurler (born 2005)

Personal information
- Born: 2005 (age 20–21) Tullogher, County Kilkenny, Ireland
- Occupation: Student

Sport
- Sport: Hurling
- Position: Full-forward
Club
- Years: Club
- 2023-present: Tullogher–Rosbercon
Club titles
- Kilkenny titles: 0
College
- Years: College
- 2024-present: University of Limerick
College titles
- Fitzgibbon titles: 0
Inter-county
- Years: County
- 2025-: Kilkenny
Inter-county titles
- Leinster titles: 1
- All-Irelands: 0
- NHL: 0
- All Stars: 0

Martin Murphy (born 2005) is an Irish hurler. At club level, he plays with Tullogher–Rosbercon and at inter-county level with the Kilkenny senior hurling team.

== Career ==
Murphy played hurling during his time at secondary school in Good Counsel College, New Ross. As a member of the school's senior hurling team, he won a Leinster PPS SAHC medal in 2022 after a 1–23 to 0–14 win over Dublin South in the final. Murphy later won a Higher Education Freshers 1 Hurling League title after scoring 2–01 in the defeat of University College Cork.

At club level, Murphy first played for Tullogher–Rosbercon at juvenile and underage levels before progressing to adult level. He won Kilkenny PJHC and Leinster Club JHC medals in 2023. Murphy scored 1-01 from play when Tullogher–Rosbercon beat St Catherine's in the 2024 All-Ireland Club JHC final.

At inter-county level, Murphy first played for Kilkenny as part of the minor team in 2022. He progressed to the under-20 team and won a Leinster U20HC medal before lining out in the defeat by Tipperary in the 2025 All-Ireland U20HC final. Murphy joined the senior team in 2025 and won a Leinster SHC medal as a non-playing substitute in his first season.

== Honours ==
Good Counsel College

- Leinster PPS Senior Hurling Championship: 2022

University of Limerick

- Higher Education Freshers 1 Hurling League: 2025

Tullogher–Rosbercon

- All-Ireland Junior Club Hurling Championship 2024
- Leinster Junior Club Hurling Championship: 2023
- Kilkenny Premier Junior Hurling Championship: 2023

Kilkenny

- Leinster Senior Hurling Championship: 2025
- Leinster Under-20 Hurling Championship: 2025
