= 2011 Kilkenny Intermediate Hurling Championship =

- Dates: 17 September – 18 October 2011
- Teams: 12
- Sponsor: Michael Lyng Motors
- Champions: Danesfort (2nd title); Richie Hogan (captain)
- Runners-up: Rower-Inistioge; Kieran Joyce (captain)
- Relegated: Graiguenamanagh

Tournament statistics
- Matches played: 13
- Goals scored: 26 (2 per match)
- Points scored: 341 (26.23 per match)
- Top scorer(s): Eoin Murphy (1-24)

The 2011 Kilkenny Intermediate Hurling Championship was the 47th staging of the Kilkenny Intermediate Hurling Championship since its establishment by the Kilkenny County Board in 1929. The championship began on 17 September 2011 and ended on 16 October 2011.

On 16 October 2011, Danesfort won the championship after a 2–11 to 0–11 victory over Rower-Inistioge in the final at Nowlan Park. It was their second title overall and their first title since 1931.

Glenmore's Eoin Murphy was the championship's top scorer with 1-24.

== Results ==
=== First round ===
17 September 2011 First round	Tullogher-Rosbercon	1-10 - 1-16	Conahy Shamrocks	Bennettsbridge
14:00	L Barron 0-5, P Hartley 1-1, E Cullinane 0-1, R Dollard 0-1, W Walsh 0-1,		P Buggy 0-6, K Mooney 0-5, P Vickery 1-0, M Lawlor 0-2, D Buggy 0-1, A Healy 0-1, G Nolan 0-1.	Referee: G Rafter

17 September 2011 First round	Emeralds	1-13 - 3-12	St. Lachtain's	Johnstown
17:00	C Martin 0-7, A Fogarty 1-0, E O'Gorman 0-2, S Norton 0-2, D Lyng 0-1, E Moriarty 0-1.		E Guinan 1-2, P Guinan 1-2, B Beckett 0-5, N Hickey 1-0, M Farrell 0-1, B Hughes 0-1, S Donnelly 0-1.	Referee: J Walsh

18 September 2011 First round	Mullinavat	1-16 - 1-10	Young Irelands	Páirc na Seamróg
12:00	C Conway 0-6, G Malone 1-2, T Duggan 0-3, W O'Dwyer 0-2, M Murphy 0-2, P Gahan 0-1.		F Farrell 0-5, D Carter 1-0, P Kehoe 0-1, M Walsh 0-1, JJ Lennon 0-1, P Holden 0-1, D Carroll 0-1.	Referee: D Connolly

18 September 2011 First round	Graignamanagh	0-10 - 2-16	John Locke's	Thomastown
13:30	E Walsh 0-5, R Dowling 0-2, C Dunne 0-1, G Dowling 0-1.		S Burke 1-8, P Kennedy 0-4, G Shelly 1-0, O McGrath 0-3, M Holohan 0-1.	Referee: J Walsh

=== Relegation play-off ===
8 October 2011 Play-off	Tullogher-Rosbercon	1-21 - 1-09	Graignamanagh	Thomastown
14:00	P Hartley 0-5, W Walsh 0-5, L Barron 0-5, E Cullinane 1-1, R Dollard 0-2, J Barron 0-2, E Mullally 0-1.		E Walsh 1-8, L Kinsella 0-1.	Referee: G Rafter

=== Quarter-finals ===
24 September 2011 Quarter-final	Glenmore	0-11 - 0-11	Conahy Shamrocks	Ballyhale
17:15	E Murphy 0-7, G Aylward 0-2, M Phelan 0-2.		P Buggy 0-4, G Nolan 0-2, M Lawlor 0-2, A Healy 0-2, G Kavanagh 0-1.	Referee: P Neary

25 September 2011 Quarter-final	Danesfort	0-11 - 0-06	John Locke's	Palmerstown
12:00	R Walsh 0-3, E Hogan 0-3, P Murphy 0-1, G O'Keeffe 0-1, S Duncan 0-1, D Forristal 0-1, P Hogan 0-1.		S Burke 0-3, M Holohan 0-1, S Bergin 0-1, J Corcoran 0-1.	Referee: E Mansfield

25 September 2011 Quarter-final	Rower-Inistioge	2-13 - 1-12	Mullinavat	Thomastown
13:30	M Grace 1-4, P Sheehan 1-2, K Joyce 0-3, C Joyce 0-2, R Galavan 0-1, J Cashin 0-1.		W O'Dwyer 1-2, C Conway 0-5, M Murphy 0-2, G Malone 0-1, J Fennelly 0-1, D Butler 0-1.	Referee: D O'Sullivan

25 September 2011 Quarter-final	Mooncoin	0-15 - 3-15	St. Lachtain's	Bennettsbridge
17:00	D Mackey 0-7, M Grace 0-3, K Kirwan 0-2, E Henebury 0-1, Aidan Walsh 0-1, Alan Walsh 0-1.		B Beckett 1-8, J Fitzpatrick 1-2, B Kennedy 1-0, N McGree 0-2, E Guinan 0-1, B Hughes 0-1, P Guinan 0-1.	Referee: J Direen

1 October 2011 Quarter-final replay	Glenmore	3-13 - 1-07	Conahy Shamrocks	Ballyhale
16:00	E Murphy 0-10, G Aylward 2-2, M Phelan 1-0, C Foran 0-1.		G Nolan 1-1, K Mooney 0-2, P Buggy 0-2, M Lawler 0-1, A Healy 0-1.	Referee: D O'Sullivan

=== Semi-finals ===
1 October 2011 Semi-final	St. Lachtain's	0-13 - 0-15	Rower-Inistioge	Nowlan Park
14:30	B Beckett 0-8, E Guinan 0-2, J Fitzpatrick 0-1, M Farrell 0-1, M McGee 0-1.		M Grace 0-5, P Sheehan 0-4, M Moore 0-2, R Galavan 0-2, J Cashin 0-1, C Joyce 0-1.	Referee: P Neary

8 October 2011 Semi-final	Danesfort	1-13 - 1-11	Glenmore	Nowlan Park
16:30	R Hogan 0-10, R Walsh 1-1, P Hogan 0-1, D Forristal 0-1.		E Murphy 1-7, G Aylward 0-2, C Foran 0-1, K Cottrell 0-1.	Referee: S Cleere

=== Final ===
16 October 2011 Final	Danesfort	2-11 - 0-11	Rower-Inistioge	Nowlan Park
15:30	R Hogan 1-5, R Walsh 1-2, P Hogan 0-3, O Daly 0-1.		P Sheehan 0-8, S Grace 0-2, C Joyce 0-1.	Referee: G Quilty

== Championship statistics ==
=== Top scorers ===
Top scorers overall

Rank	Player	Club	Tally	Total	Matches	Average
1	Eoin Murphy	Glenmore	1-24	27	3	9.00
2	Bill Beckett	St. Lachtain's	1-21	24	3	8.00
3	Richie Hogan	Danesfort	1-18	21	3	7.00
4	Paul Sheehan	Rower-Inistioge	1-14	17	3	5.66
5	Eddie Walsh	Graignamanagh	1-13	16	2	8.00
6	Simon Burke	John Locke's	1-11	14	2	7.00
7	Ger Aylward	Glenmore	2-06	12	3	4.00
7	Robbie Walsh	Danesfort	2-06	12	3	4.00
7	Michael Grace	Rower-Inistioge	1-09	12	3	4.00
7	Paul Buggy	Conahy Shamrocks	0-12	12	3	4.00

Top scorers in a single game

Rank	Player	Club	Tally	Total	Opposition
1	Simon Burke	John Locke's	1-08	11	Graignamanagh
1	Eddie Walsh	Graignamanagh	1-08	11	Tullogher-Rosbercon
1	Bill Beckett	St. Lachtain's	1-08	11	Mooncoin
4	Eoin Murphy	Glenmore	1-07	10	Danesfort
4	Eoin Murphy	Glenmore	0-10	10	Conahy Shamrocks
4	Richie Hogan	Danesfort	0-10	10	Glenmore
7	Ger Aylward	Glenmore	2-02	8	Conahy Shamrocks
7	Richie Hogan	Danesfort	1-05	8	Rower-Inistioge
7	Bill Beckett	St. Lachtain's	0-08	8	Rower-Inistioge
7	Paul Sheehan	Rower-Inistioge	0-08	8	Danesfort
