= 2004–05 All-Ireland Junior Club Hurling Championship =

All Ireland Champions
- Winners: Galmoy (1st win)
- Captain: David Delaney

All Ireland Runners-up
- Runners-up: Oran
- Captain: Adrian Kelly

Provincial Champions
- Munster: Ballygarvan
- Leinster: Galmoy
- Ulster: Shane O'Neills
- Connacht: Oran

The 2004–05 All-Ireland Junior Club Hurling Championship was the second staging of the All-Ireland Junior Club Hurling Championship since its establishment by the Gaelic Athletic Association in 2002.

The All-Ireland final was played on 28 March 2005 at Semple Stadium in Thurles, County Tipperary, between Galmoy from Kilkenny and Oran from Roscommon, in what was their first ever meeting in the final. Galmoy won the match by 2-18 to 0-09 to claim their first ever All-Ireland title.

== Connacht Junior Club Hurling Championship ==
=== Connacht final ===
| 12 December 2004 Final | Oran | 1-08 - 1-06 | Skehana | Rockfield Grounds |
| | C Kelly 0-4, T Crowley 1-0, A Kelly 0-1, J Shally 0-1, K McDermott 0-1, G Fallon 0-1. | | J Fahy 1-0, D Costello 0-3, J McHugh 0-3. |

== Leinster Junior Club Hurling Championship ==
=== Leinster first round ===
| 30 October 2004 First round | Kilcoole | 0-19 - 0-08 | Ros Glas |

| 30 October 2004 First round | Clonguish | 2-06 - 2-15 | Trumera | Pearse Park |

| 13 November 2004 First round | Galmoy | 3-22 - 0-08 | Palatine | Galmoy GAA Grounds |
| | M Phelan 0-8, P Brennan 1-4, P Delaney 0-5, M Brennan 1-0, D Gray 1-0, P Russell 0-2, D Doyle 0-1, B Doherty 0-1, N Doherty 0-1. | | E McMahon 0-3, B Clifford 0-1, P Reid 0-1, J Reid 0-1, G Farrell 0-1, E McGarry 0-1. |

=== Leinster quarter-final ===
| 27 November 2004 Quarter-final | St Oliver Plunkett's | 1-09 - 0-04 | Clann na nGael |

| 27 November 2004 Quarter-final | Ballygarrett-Réalt na Mara | 5-09 - 0-04 | Kilcoole |

| 27 November 2004 Quarter-final | Belmont | 1-09 - 1-14 | Galmoy | Moystown GAA Grounds |
| | P Egan 0-6, A Egan 1-0, C Kearns 0-1, B Fox 0-1, S Grennan 0-1. | | M Phelan 0-7, P Russell 1-2, D Gray 0-3, N Doherty 0-2. |

| 28 November 2004 Semi-final | Trumera | 1-13 - 1-09 | St. Patrick's | O'Moore Park |

=== Leinster semi-finals ===
| 4 December 2004 Semi-final | Trumera | 3-08 - 2-08 | Ballygarrett-Réalt na Mara | O'Moore Park |
| | J Coogan 1-4, D Callaghan 1-2, C O'Neill 1-0, C Brophy 0-1, D Lalor 0-1. | | L Gleeson 1-4, S Byrne 1-0, L Kinsella 0-1, M Doyle 0-1, M Kinsella 0-1, P Naughton 0-1. |

| 5 December 2004 Semi-final | St Oliver Plunkett's | 0-02 - 2-14 | Galmoy | Cusack Park |
| | P Collins 0-2. | | M Phelan 1-5, K Lonergan 1-1, P Russell 0-3, P Brennan 0-2, A Gray 0-2, N Doherty 0-1. |

=== Leinster final ===
| 12 December 2004 Final | Galmoy | 0-14 - 0-08 | Trumera | Páirc Lachtáin |
| | M Phelan 0-7, P Russell 0-3, A Gray 0-3, N Doherty 0-1. | | J Coogan 0-6, J O'Connor 0-1, D Callaghan 0-1. |

== Munster Junior Club Hurling Championship ==
=== Munster quarter-finals ===
| 27 November 2004 Quarter-final | Ennistymon | 2-06 - 0-10 | Grangemockler/Ballyneale | Ennistymon GAA Grounds |
| | T Hogan 2-2, J O'Loughlin 0-2, P O'Loughlin 0-1, P Devitt 0-1. | | C Houlihan 0-5, P Cahill 0-2, P Downey 0-2, J Downey 0-1. |

| 28 November 2004 Quarter-final | Ballygarvan | 1-13 - 1-09 | Knockaderry | Páirc Liam Mhic Cárthaigh |
| | L Dillon 0-7, M Dowd 1-0, M Sheedy 0-2, F Barry 0-2, S O'Leary 0-1, S White 0-1. | | D O'Sullivan 0-5, K Moloney 1-1, D O'Sullivan 0-1, L Cullurn 0-1, C Moloney 0-1. |

=== Munster semi-finals ===
| 4 December 2004 Semi-final | Tramore | 1-04 - 0-03 | Ennistymon | James McGinn Park |
| | S Dunphy 1-0, B Canty 0-2, P J Dunphy 0-2. | | C Foley 0-1, E Curtin 0-1, J O'Loughlin 0-1. |

| 5 December 2004 Semi-final | Kenmare Shamrocks | 0-06 - 0-11 | Ballygarvan | Kenmare Shamrocks GAA Grounds |
| | P Randles 0-5, S Regan 0-1. | | L Dillon 0-3, S White 0-3, M Sheehy 0-2, A Butler 0-2, S O'Leary 0-1. |

=== Munster final ===
| 12 December 2004 Final | Ballygarvan | 0-16 - 1-05 | Tramore | Páirc Mac Gearailt |
| | L Dillon 0-7, F Barry 0-3, G White 0-2, M Sheehy 0-2, S White 0-1, K Ashman 0-1. | | B Costello 1-1, J Curry 0-2, B Canty 0-1, D White 0-1. | Referee: J Ryan (Tipperary) |

== Ulster Junior Club Hurling Championship ==
=== Ulster final ===
| 31 October 2004 Final | Shane O'Neills | 4-13 - 0-05 | St. Malachy's | Casement Park |
| | | Report |

== All-Ireland Junior Club Hurling Championship ==
=== All-Ireland semi-finals ===
| 13 February 2005 Semi-final | Galmoy | 6-15 - 1-05 | Shane O'Neills | Páirc Naomh Uinseann |
| | N Doherty 1-4, P Brennan 2-0, P Russell 1-3, M Phelan 0-5, A Gray 1-1, G Doherty 1-0, N Doherty 0-2. | | S Ward 1-0, Blain McDermott 0-3, Benny McDermot 0-1, HM McKay 0-1. |

| 13 February 2005 Semi-final | Oran | 3-10 - 0-05 | Ballygarvan | MacDonagh Park |
| | C Kelly 1-3, J Grehen 1-1, D Beirne 1-0, K McDermott 0-2, G Fallon 0-2, T Crowley 0-1, F Quine 0-1. | | L Dillon 0-2, F Barry 0-2, G White 0-1. |

=== All-Ireland final ===
| 28 March 2005 Final | Galmoy | 2–18 - 0–09 | Oran | Semple Stadium |
| | P Russell 2–3, M Phelan 0–9, N Doherty 0–3, D Gray 0–2, M Brennan 0–1. | Report | C Kelly 0–5, A Kelly 0–4. | Referee: J Gribben (Down) |
