= 1985 Kilkenny Intermediate Hurling Championship =

- Champions: Graignamanagh (3rd title)
- Runners-up: Piltown

The 1985 Kilkenny Intermediate Hurling Championship was the 21st staging of the Kilkenny Intermediate Hurling Championship since its establishment by the Kilkenny County Board in 1929.

The final was played on 13 October 1985 at Nowlan Park in Kilkenny, between Graignamanagh and Piltown, in what was their first ever meeting in the final. Graignamanagh won the match by 4–11 to 2–10 to claim their third championship title overall and a first championship title in five years.

== Results ==
=== Final ===
13 October 1985 Final	Graignamanagh	4-11 - 2-10	Piltown	Nowlan Park
	P Nolan 2-1, J Whelan 1-3, J Prendergast 0-4, T Dowling 0-1, R Grace 0-1, J Meaney 0-1.		JJ Long 1-7, P Power 1-0, N Culleton 0-2, G Culleton 0-1.
