= 2018 Kilkenny Intermediate Hurling Championship =

- Dates: 22 September – 28 October 2018
- Teams: 12
- Sponsor: Michael Lyng Motors Hyundai
- Champions: Graigue-Ballycallan (2nd title); Darragh Egan (captain); Declan Browne (manager)
- Runners-up: Tullaroan; Stephen Maher (captain)
- Relegated: Mooncoin

Tournament statistics
- Matches played: 13
- Goals scored: 32 (2.46 per match)
- Points scored: 349 (26.85 per match)
- Top scorer(s): Cian O'Donoghue (1-29)

The 2018 Kilkenny Intermediate Hurling Championship was the 54th staging of the Kilkenny Intermediate Hurling Championship since its establishment by the Kilkenny County Board in 1929. The championship began on 22 September 2018 and ended on 28 October 2018.

On 28 October 2018, Graigue-Ballycallan won the championship after a 2–16 to 2–13 defeat of Tullaroan in the final at Nowlan Park. It was their second championship overall and their first title since 1987.

Tullogher-Rosbercon's Cian O'Donoghue was the championship's top scorer with 1-29.

== Team changes ==
=== To Championship ===
Promoted from the Kilkenny Junior Hurling Championship

- John Locke's

Relegated from the Kilkenny Senior Hurling Championship

- St. Martin's

=== From Championship ===
Promoted to the Kilkenny Senior Hurling Championship

- St. Patrick's Ballyragget

Relegated to the Kilkenny Junior Hurling Championship

- Dunnamaggin

== Results ==
=== First round ===
22 September 2018 First round	Glenmore	2-17 - 2-17	St. Martin's	Páirc na Seamróg, Ballyhale
	A Murphy 0-13, L Hennessy 2-0, G Aylward 0-2, E Murphy 0-2.		S Kinsella 1-3, J Mulhall 0-5, C McGrath 0-4, O Walsh 1-0, D Shore 0-2, B Coady 0-1, M Morrissey 0-1, J Shore 0-1.	Referee: J Kennedy (Ballyhale Shamrocks)

22 September 2018 First round	Thomastown	2-13 - 1-10	Mooncoin	Mullinavat
	R Donnelly 0-10, JJ Farrell 2-1, T Hanrahan 0-1, C Butler 0-1.		J Fitzgerald 1-7, S Crowley 0-1, P Heneberry 0-1, M Grace 0-1.

23 September 2018 First round	Tullogher-Rosbercon	1-15 - 0-12	Fenians	Bennettsbridge
	C O'Donoghue 1-12, S Ryan 0-2, W Walsh 0-1.		C Tobin 0-10, K Grehan 0-1, W Brennan 0-1.	Referee: M Flynn (Mooncoin)

23 September 2018 First round	Young Irelands	0-17 - 1-17	St. Lachtain's	Canon Kearns Park, Castlecomer
	P Holden 0-9, C Nolan 0-4, S Carey 0-2, S Kehoe 0-1, T Drea 0-1.		L Hickey 0-9, P Killeen 1-0, M McGree 0-3, J Maher 0-3, S Rafter 0-1, S Donnelly 0-1.	Referee: P Cahill (Dunnamaggin)

29 September 2018 First round replay	Glenmore	3-11 - 0-14	St. Martin's	Páirc na Seamróg, Ballyhale
	A Murphy 1-8, G Aylward 1-2, M Aylward 1-1.		C McGrath 0-7, E McGrath 0-4, J Mulhall 0-1, S Kinsella 0-1, J Shore 0-1.	Referee: M O'Sullivan (Ballyhale Shamrocks)

=== Relegation playoff ===
13 October 2018 Relegation playoff	Mooncoin	2-11 - 3-14	Young Irelands	Páirc na Seamróg, Ballyhale
	P Hennebry 1-2, K Crowley 1-1, P Walsh 0-4, J Fitzgerald 0-2, M O'Neill 0-1, R Wall 0-1.		P Holden 1-6, S Kehoe 1-1, S Carey 1-0, JP Treacy 0-3, C Nolan 0-2, D Carroll 01-, T Drea 0-1.	Referee: G Rafter (Threecastles)

=== Quarter-finals ===
6 October 2018 Quarter-final	Graigue-Ballycallan	2-21 - 0-16	Glenmore	Páirc na Seamróg, Ballyhale
	S Ryan 1-6, A Brennan 1-1, B Ryan 0-4, E Brennan 0-3, J Roberts 0-3, S O'Dwyer 0-2, J Ryall 0-1, C Murphy 0-1.		A Murphy 0-4, S Doherty 0-2, E Murphy 0-2, M Aylward 0-2, M Phelan 0-2, L Hennessy 0-1, E Vereker 0-1, G Aylward 0-1, D Hartley 0-1.	Referee: P Burke (Emeralds)

6 October 2018 Quarter-final	John Locke's	2-10 - 1-22	Tullogher-Rosbercon	Mooncoin GAA Complex, Mooncoin
	J Power 0-7, P Kennedy 1-0, M Houlihan 1-0, R Kerwick 0-2, T Delaney 0-1.		C O'Donoghue 0-11, C Hennessy 1-3, W Walsh 0-4, S Ryan 0-3, J Shelly 0-1.	Referee: G Rafter (Threecastles)

6 October 2018 Quarter-final	Lisdowney	1-10 - 2-10	St. Lachtain's	Jim Maher Memorial Park, Urlingford
	C O'Carroll 1-0, R Hickey 0-3, A Fogarty 0-2, B Kavanagh 0-2, N Brennan 0-1, W Kenny 0-1, D O'Carroll 0-1.		J Maher 1-2, P Killeen 1-1, L Hickey 0-4, S Donnelly 0-2, A Rafter 0-1.	Referee: E Mansfield (Cloneen)

7 October 2018 Quarter-final	Tullaroan	1-24 - 2-11	Thomastown	Danesfort
	S Walsh 0-8, J Walton 0-6, Peter Walsh 1-1, Pádraig Walsh 0-4, T Walsh V 0-2, M Keoghan 0-2, M Walsh 0-1.		R Donnelly 0-8, JJ Farrell 1-1, T O'Hanrahan 0-1, A Kehoe 0-1.	Referee: R Byrne (Glenmore)

=== Semi-finals ===
13 October 2018 Semi-final	Graigue-Ballycallan	0-14 - 0-11	Tullogher-Rosbercon	Nowlan Park, Kilkenny
	C Murphy 0-4, B Ryan 0-3, S Ryan 0-3, S Butler 0-1, J Roberts 0-1, S O'Dwyer 0-1, C Hoyne 0-1.		C O'Donoghue 0-6, R Dollard 0-2, S Ryan 0-2, C Hennessy 0-1.	Referee: S Cleere (O'Loughlin Gaels)

14 October 2018 Semi-final	St. Lachtain's	0-13 - 0-19	Tullaroan	Nowlan Park, Kilkenny
	L Hickey 0-9, P Killeen 0-2, D Lennon 0-1, N McGree 0-1.		S Walsh 0-14, Pádraig Walsh 0-2, B Gaffney 0-1, J Walton 0-1, Peter Walsh 0-1.	Referee: M Flynn (Mooncoin)

=== Final ===
28 October 2018 Final	Tullaroan	2-13 - 2-16	Graigue-Ballycallan	Nowlan Park, Kilkenny
	P Walsh (1-2); S Walsh (0-5); M Keoghan (1-1); T Og Walsh (0-2); J Walton, S Dowling, B Gaffney (0-1 each).		C Murphy (2-10); B Ryan (0-3); S Butler, A Brennan, S Ryan (0-1 each).

== Championship statistics ==
=== Top scorers ===
Top scorers overall

Rank	Player	Club	Tally	Total	Matches	Average
1	Cian O'Donoghue	Tullogher-Rosbercon	1-29	32	3	10.66
2	Alan Murphy	Glenmore	1-25	28	3	9.33
3	Shane Walsh	Tullaroan	0-27	27	3	9.00
4	Liam Hickey	St. Lachtain's	0-22	22	3	7.33
5	Conor Murphy	Graigue-Ballycallan	2-15	21	3	7.00
6	Paul Holden	Young Irelands	1-15	18	2	9.00
6	Robbie Donnelly	Thomastown	0-18	18	2	9.00
8	Seán Ryan	Graigue-Ballycallan	1-10	13	3	4.33
9	John Fitzgerald	Mooncoin	1-09	12	2	6.00
10	Jonjo Farrell	Thomastown	3-02	11	3	3.66
10	Pádraig Walsh	Tullaroan	1-08	11	3	3.66
10	Colin McGrath	St. Martin's	0-11	11	2	5.50

Top scorers in a single game

Rank	Player	Club	Tally	Total	Opposition
1	Conor Murphy	Graigue-Ballycallan	2-10	16	Tullaroan
2	Cian O'Donoghue	Tullogher-Rosbercon	1-12	15	Fenians
3	Shane Walsh	Tullaroan	0-14	14	St. Lachtain's
4	Alan Murphy	Glenmore	0-13	13	St. Martin's
5	Alan Murphy	Glenmore	1-08	11	St. Martin's
5	Cian O'Donoghue	Tullogher-Rosbercon	0-11	11	John Locke's
7	John Fitzgerald	Mooncoin	1-07	10	Thomastown
7	Robbie Donnelly	Thomastown	0-10	10	Mooncoin
7	Conor Tobin	Fenians	0-10	10	Tullogher-Rosbercon
10	Paul Holden	Young Irelands	1-06	9	Mooncoin
10	Seán Ryan	Graigue-Ballycallan	1-06	9	Glenmore
10	Paul Holden	Young Irelands	0-09	9	St. Lachtain's
10	Liam Hickey	St. Lachtain's	0-09	9	Young Irelands
10	Liam Hickey	St. Lachtain's	0-09	9	Tullaroan
