= Imelda Kennedy =

Personal information
- Born: County Kilkenny, Ireland

Sport
- Sport: Camogie
- Position: half forward
Club
- Years: Club
- 1993-: St Lachtain's, Freshford
Club titles
- Kilkenny titles: 10
- Leinster titles: 6
- All-Ireland Titles: 3
Inter-county
- Years: County
- 1993-2006: Kilkenny
Inter-county titles
- All-Irelands: 1
- All Stars: 1

Imelda Kennedy is a former camogie player from County Kilkenny. She won an All-Star award in 2006. Kennedy was a member of the Kilkenny team that won the All-Ireland Senior Camogie Championship in 1994, and won All Ireland Club Championship medals with St Lachtain's, Freshford in 2004, 2005 and 2006 and All Ireland titles with Kilkenny at minor level. She also won two Leinster junior medals, two All-Ireland club medals, four Leinster Club medals and eight county championships with her club. Kennery previously won All Ireland medals at second-level college and Féile na nGael level.
