= 1993 Kilkenny Junior Hurling Championship =

- Dates: 26 September 1993
- Teams: 2
- Champions: St Lachtain's (2nd title); Mick Morrissey (captain); Kevin Fennelly (manager)
- Runners-up: Kilmacow; Greg Power (captain); Richard Power (manager)

Tournament statistics
- Matches played: 1
- Goals scored: 4 (4 per match)
- Points scored: 21 (21 per match)
- Top scorer(s): Brian Waldron (1-06)

The 1993 Kilkenny Junior Hurling Championship was the 83rd staging of the Kilkenny Junior Hurling Championship since its establishment by the Kilkenny County Board in 1905.

The final was played on 26 September 1993 at Nowlan Park in Kilkenny, between St Lachtain's and Kilmacow, in what was their first ever meeting in the final. St Lachtain's won the match by 3–14 to 1–07 to claim their second championship title overall and a first title in 34 years.

== Qualification ==
Division	Champions
North Junior Hurling Championship	St Lachtain's
South Junior Hurling Championship	Kilmacow

== Results ==
=== Final ===
26 September 1993 Final	St Lachtain's	3-14 - 1-07	Kilmacow	Nowlan Park
	B Waldron 1-6, D Hurley 1-1, D Anderson 1-0, G Ryan 0-3, O O'Connor 0-2, P Phelan 0-1, E Maher 0-1.		G Drohan 0-4, P Gahan 1-0, J Dalton 0-2, P Long 0-1.
