= 1894 Kilkenny Senior Hurling Championship =

Annual hurling competition season

- Champions: Confederation (2nd title)
- Runners-up: Callan

The 1894 Kilkenny Senior Hurling Championship was the sixth staging of the Kilkenny Senior Hurling Championship since its establishment by the Kilkenny County Board.

Confederation won the championship after a 2–05 to 1–01 defeat of Callan in the final.
