= 1975 Kilkenny Senior Hurling Championship =

Annual hurling competition season

- Teams: 12
- Champions: James Stephens (4th title); Phil Larkin (captain)
- Runners-up: Galmoy; Stephen Delaney (captain)

The 1975 Kilkenny Senior Hurling Championship was the 81st staging of the Kilkenny Senior Hurling Championship since its establishment by the Kilkenny County Board.

Fenians were the defending champions.

On 16 November 1975, James Stephens won the championship after a 1–14 to 1–05 defeat of Galmoy in the final. It was their fourth championship title overall and their first title in six championship seasons.

== Participating teams ==
North	South
Erin's Own	Ballyhale Shamrocks
Fenians	Bennettsbridge
Galmoy	Mooncoin
James Stephens	Thomastown
St. Lachtain's	Rower-Inistioge
Young Irelands	Windgap

== Results ==
=== Semi-finals ===
21 September 1975 Semi-final	Galmoy	1-17 - 3-10	Mooncoin	Nowlan Park, Kilkenny
	W Phelan 0-6, B Harte 1-2, J Phelan 0-5, R Delaney 0-2, M Phelan 0-1, L Norton 0-1.		J Dunphy 2-1, C Dunne 0-6, W O'Keeffe 1-0, J Grace 0-2, J Wall 0-1.

21 September 1975 Semi-final	James Stephens	2-09 - 2-09	Ballyhale Shamrocks	Nowlan Park, Kilkenny
	L O'Brien 2-6, M Crotty 0-2, M Lehay 0-1.		L Aylward 1-1, P Carroll 1-0, S Reid 0-3, R Reid 0-2, G Fennelly 0-2, M Fennelly 0-1.

5 October 1975 Semi-final replay	James Stephens	0-10 - 1-07	Ballyhale Shamrocks	Nowlan Park, Kilkenny
	L O'Brien 0-5, S Brennan 0-2, M Crotty 0-1, M Leahy 0-1, D McCormack 0-1.		S Reid 0-5, L Aylward 1-0, G Fennelly 0-1, R Reid 0-1.

9 November 1975 Semi-final second replay	James Stephens	2-22 - 0-07	Ballyhale Shamrocks	Nowlan Park, Kilkenny
	L O'Brien 0-10, M Leahy 2-0, J McCormack 0-5, M Crotty 0-3, B Cody 0-2, S Brennan 0-1, M Taylor 0-1.		S Connolly 0-2, S Reid 0-1, M Fennelly 0-1, P Holden 0-1, L Aylward 0-1, M Mason 0-1.

=== Final ===
16 November 1975 Final	James Stephens	1-14 - 1-05	Galmoy	Nowlan Park, Kilkenny
	L O'Brien 0-7, G Tyrrell 1-0, S Brennan 0-2, D McCormack 0-1, M Crotty 0-1, P Larkin 0-1, B Cody 0-1, M Taylor 0-1.		S Delaney 1-0, W Phelan 0-3, J Phelan 0-2.
