= Knocktopher GAA =

Gaelic sports club in County Kilkenny, Ireland

Knocktopher
- Cnoc an Tóchair
- County: Kilkenny
- Grounds: Knocktopher

Senior Club Championships
	All Ireland	Leinster champions	Kilkenny champions
Football:	0	0	4

Knocktopher GAA was a Gaelic Athletic Association club located in Knocktopher, County Kilkenny, Ireland. The club fielded teams in both Gaelic football and hurling.

== History ==
The Knocktopher area was a Gaelic football stronghold at the turn of the 20th century. The club won all four of its Kilkenny SFC titles in a ten-year period between 1901 and 1911, with clubman Dick Holohan also captaining Kilkenny to the Leinster SFC title in 1911. Knocktopher went into a period of decline following this, as three clubs - Knocktopher, Knockmoylan and Ballyhale - all operated within the one parish.

By the 1920s, Knocktopher was operating at junior level in both codes, winning the Kilkenny JFC title in 1924 and the Kilkenny JHC title in 1931. Several Southern JHC titles were won over the following decades, however, it was 1965 before the club won its second Kilkenny JHC title.

A shortage of players saw Knocktopher and parish rivals Ballyhale amalgamating at underage levels, a move which resulted in the amalgamation reaching three successive Kilkenny MAHC finals in-a-a-row in the mid-1960s. The meeting of both clubs in a divisional U21HC game in 1969, lead to calls for the clubs to amalgamate fully and have one club representing the parish. In spite of some opposition, Knocktopher and Ballyhale eventually joined to form Ballyhale Shamrocks in January 1972.

== Honours ==
- Kilkenny Senior Football Championship (4): 1901, 1908, 1910, 1911
- Kilkenny Junior Football Championship (1): 1924
- Kilkenny Junior Hurling Championship (2): 1931, 1965
- Southern Kilkenny Junior Football Championship (2): 1924
- Southern Kilkenny Junior Hurling Championship (7): 1931, 1949, 1955, 1958, 1960, 1965, 1967

== Notable players ==
- Frank Cummins: All-Ireland SHC-winner (1967, 1969, 1972, 1974, 1975, 1979, 1982, 1983)
- Denis Heaslip: All-Ireland SHC-winner (1957, 1963)
- Dick Holohan: Leinster SFC-winner (1911)
