= 1893 Kilkenny Senior Hurling Championship =

Annual hurling competition season

- Champions: Confederation (1st title)
- Runners-up: Callan

The 1893 Kilkenny Senior Hurling Championship was the fifth staging of the Kilkenny Senior Hurling Championship since its establishment by the Kilkenny County Board.

Confederation won the championship after a 1–04 to 0–00 defeat of Callan in the final.
