= 1896 Kilkenny Senior Hurling Championship =

Annual hurling competition season

- Teams: 5
- Champions: Confederation (2nd title)
- Runners-up: Callan

The 1896 Kilkenny Senior Hurling Championship was the eighth staging of the Kilkenny Senior Hurling Championship since its establishment by the Kilkenny County Board. The draw for the opening round fixtures took place on 29 March 1896.

Confederation won the championship after a receiving a walkover from Callan in the final.
