= 1996 Kilkenny Intermediate Hurling Championship =

- Teams: 12
- Sponsor: Vale Oil
- Champions: O'Loughlin Gaels (2nd title); Paul Cleere (captain)
- Runners-up: Graignamanagh; Jim O'Driscoll (captain)

The 1996 Kilkenny Intermediate Hurling Championship was the 32nd staging of the Kilkenny Intermediate Hurling Championship since its establishment by the Kilkenny County Board in 1929.

The final was played on 20 October 1996 at Nowlan Park in Kilkenny, between O'Loughlin Gaels and Graignamanagh, in what was their first ever meeting in the final. O'Loughlin Gaels won the match by 2–13 to 2–08 to claim their second championship title overall and a first championship title in 18 years.

== Results ==
=== Final ===
20 October 1996 Final	O'Loughlin Gaels	2-13 - 2-08	Graignamanagh	Nowlan Park
	J Daly 2-3, P Cleere 0-8, S Dowling 0-1, B Kelly 0-1.		J Carroll 1-7, J Prendergast 1-0, J Whelan 0-1.
