= Kilkenny Senior Camogie Championship =

Annual camogie competition in Ireland

- Irish: Craobh Chamógaíochta Cill Chainnigh
- Code: Camogie
- Founded: 1932
- Region: Kilkenny (GAA)
- Trophy: Bridget 'Biddy' Barry memorial cup
- No. of teams: 12
- Title holders: Dicksboro (5th title)
- First winner: O'Nowlan's
- Most titles: St Paul's (25 titles)
- Official website: www.kilkennycamogie.ie

The Kilkenny Camogie Championship is the senior camogie competition featuring clubs affiliated to the Kilkenny GAA.

St Paul's are the competitions most successful club, having won 25 titles.

Dicksboro are the reigning champions for the second successive year, having defeated last years finalists, Piltown in the 2026 final.

The winners of the Kilkenny Senior Camogie Championship are awarded the Bridget 'Biddy' Barry memorial cup.

== Format ==
The Kilkenny Senior Camogie Championship is played as a knock-out. The top 4 teams from the Kilkenny Senior Camogie League receive a bye to the quarter-finals. The other 8 teams contest a first round match.

The champion qualifies for the Leinster Senior Club Camogie Championship.

== Teams ==
The following teams participated in the 2026 Championship:

Teams	Position in 2026	Titles	Last Title
Dicksboro	Champion	5	2026
Piltown	Runners-up	1	2024
Tullaroan	Semi-finals	0	
Thomastown	Semi-finals	7	2022
St Brigid's	Quarter-finals	3	2002
Young Ireland's	Quarter-finals	1	1933
Clara	Quarter-finals	0	
Danesfort	Quarter-finals	0	
O'Loughlin Gaels	First round	0	
Windgap	First round	0	
St Martin’s	Relegation final	0	
James Stephens	Relegated to Intermediate	0	

== Roll of honour ==
#	Club	Titles	Years won
1	St Paul's	25	1965, 1966, 1967, 1968, 1969, 1970, 1971, 1972, 1973, 1974, 1975, 1976, 1977, 1978, 1979, 1980, 1982, 1983, 1984, 1985, 1986, 1987, 1988, 1989, 1990
2	St Lachtain's	12	1998, 1999, 2000, 2001, 2003, 2004, 2005, 2006, 2007, 2008, 2009, 2011
3	Thomastown	7	1952, 2014, 2016, 2017, 2018, 2020, 2022
4	Dicksboro	5	2019, 2021, 2023, 2025, 2026
5	Lisdowney	5	1992, 1993, 1994, 1996, 1997
6	Mullinavat	4	2010, 2012, 2013, 2015
7	St Brigid's	3	1991, 1995, 2002
8	St Brendan's	2	1961, 1963
9	Piltown	1	2024
9	South Selection	1	1981
9	St Bernadette's	1	1960
9	Mooncoin	1	1959
9	St Claire's	1	1958
9	Young Ireland's	1	1933
9	O'Nowlans	1	1932

== Finals listed by year ==
Leinster and All-Ireland winners
Leinster winners and All-Ireland finalists
Leinster winners

Year	Winner	Score	Runners up	Score	Venue
2026	Dicksboro	1-12	Piltown	0-10	Nowlan Park
2025	Dicksboro	1-14	Piltown	0-12	Nowlan Park
2024	Piltown	3-11	Dicksboro	0-14	Nowlan Park
2023	Dicksboro	3-18	Windgap	1-11	Mooncoin
2022	Thomastown	2-08	Dicksboro	1-10	Pairc Lachtain
2021	Dicksboro	0-15	Piltown	2-08	Callan
2020	Thomastown	2-13	St Lachtain's	0-12	
2019	Dicksboro	1-07	Piltown	0-08	Callan
2018	Thomastown	0-11	Piltown	0-09	Callan
2017	Thomastown	3-10	Dicksboro	2-05	
2016	Thomastown	2-14	Mullinavat	1-10	
2015	Mullinavat	2-10	Thomastown	1-10	
2014	Thomastown	3-06	Mullinavat	0-09	
2013	Mullinavat	4-09	Thomastown	2-09	
2012	Mullinavat	5-09	St Lachtain's	1-08	
2011	St Lachtain's	3-14	Mullinavat	1-08	
2010	Mullinavat	1-07	St Lachtain's	0-09	
2009	St Lachtain's	3-16	Mullinavat	2-07	
2008	St Lachtain's	4-10	St Martin’s	0-1	
2007	St Lachtain's	6-15	St Martin’s	3-03	
2006	St Lachtain's	2-14	Mullinavat	0-06	
2005	St Lachtain's	2-12	Mullinavat	0-02	
2004	St Lachtain's	4-09	Ballyhale Shamrocks	0-01	
2003	St Lachtain's	2-13	Lisdowney	0-04	
2002	St Brigid's	2-03	St Lachtain's	0-07	
2001	St Lachtain's	1-11	Lisdowney	1-03	
2000	St Lachtain's	2-08	Lisdowney	1-06	
1999	St Lachtain's	2-10	Lisdowney	0-02	
1998	St Lachtain's	3-10	St Brigid's	2-03	
1997	Lisdowney	1-11	Freshford	1-09	
1996	Lisdowney	1-14 (Replay); 1-11	St Brigid's	1-10 (Replay); 0-14	
1995	St Brigid's	2-12	Lisdowney	2-10	
1994	Lisdowney	7-07	Freshford	2-04	
1993	Lisdowney	1-09	Freshford	0-04	
1992	Lisdowney	5-09	St Brigid's	3-04	
1991	St Brigid's	2-14	Lisdowney	1-11	
1990	St. Paul's	9-09	St Brigid's	1-05	
1989	St. Paul's	9-15	Lisdowney	1-10	
1988	St. Paul's		Shamrocks		
1987	St. Paul's	2-07	Shamrocks	0-12	
1986	St. Paul's		St. Brigid's		
1985	St. Paul's	7-05	St. Brigid's	2-10	
1984	St. Paul's	1-04	Shamrocks	0-06	
1983	St. Paul's	4-06	St. Brigid's	4-03	
1982	St. Paul's	4-05	South Selection	1-00	
1981	South Selection		St. Paul's		
1980	St. Paul's		South Selection		
1979	St. Paul's	Uncontested			
1978	St. Paul's		Carrickshock		
1977	St. Paul's		Carrickshock		
1976	St. Paul's		Carrickshock		
1975	St. Paul's	6-08	Young Ireland's	0-02	
1974	St. Paul's		Young Ireland's		
1973	St. Paul's	5-04	Carrickshock	1-02	
1972	St. Paul's	5-04	Carrickshock	2-04	
1971	St. Paul's		Young Ireland's		
1970	St. Paul's	Uncontested			
1969	St. Paul's		Mooncoin		
1968	St. Paul's	Uncontested			
1967	St. Paul's	Uncontested			
1966	St. Paul's	4-03	Castlecomer	2-01	
1965	St. Paul's	League System			
1964	No Championship				
1963	St. Brendan's	w.o.	St. Bernadette's	scr.	
1962	No Championship				
1961	St. Brendan's	2-00	Cuffesgrange	1-00	
1960	St. Bernadette's	4-01	St. Brendan's	3-00	
1959	Mooncoin	3-00	Moneenroe	1-00	
1958	St. Claire's		St. Brigid's		
1953 to 1957	No Championship				
1952	Thomastown	2-02	Moneenroe	1-01	
1934 to 1951	No Championship				
1933	Young Ireland's		St Ita's		
1932	O'Nowlan's	6-00	Tailteann	2-00	
