= Mick Walsh =

Irish hurler (1934–2013)

Personal information
- Native name: Mícheál Breathnach (Irish)
- Nickname: Broyly
- Born: 1934 Slieverue, County Kilkenny, Ireland
- Died: 30 September 2013 (aged 79) Waterford, Ireland
- Occupation: Lorry driver
- Height: 5 ft 9 in (175 cm)

Sport
- Sport: Hurling
- Position: Centre-back
Clubs
- Years: Club
- Slieverue; Mount Sion
Club titles
- Kilkenny titles: 1
Inter-county
- Years: County
- 1957-1962 1963-1964: Kilkenny; Waterford
Inter-county titles
- Leinster titles: 3
- All-Irelands: 1
- NHL: 1

Michael Walsh (1934 – 30 September 2013) was an Irish hurler. At club level he played with Slieverue and Mount Sion and was an All-Ireland Championship winner with the Kilkenny senior hurling team before later lining out with the Waterford senior hurling team.
