= Kieran Purcell =

Irish hurler

Personal information
- Native name: Ciarán Puirséil (Irish)
- Born: 5 August 1945 (age 81) Windgap, County Kilkenny, Ireland
- Height: 5 ft 10 in (178 cm)

Sport
- Sport: Hurling
- Position: Full-forward
Club
- Years: Club
- 1960s-1980s: Windgap
Club titles
- Kilkenny titles: 0
Inter-county
- Years: County
- 1971-1977: Kilkenny
Inter-county titles
- Leinster titles: 5
- All-Irelands: 3
- NHL: 0
- All Stars: 3

Kieran Purcell (born 5 August 1945) is an Irish retired sportsperson. He played hurling with his local club Windgap and was a member of the Kilkenny senior inter-county team from 1971 until 1977.

== Playing career ==
=== Club ===
Purcell played his club hurling with his local Windgap club. He enjoyed some success but he never won a senior county title.

=== Inter-county ===
Purcell first came to prominence as a member of the Kilkenny minor hurling team in the early 1960s. He found it difficult to nail down a place on the team, however, he did enjoy some Leinster and All-Ireland successes as a substitute. Purcell later joined the Kilkenny under-21 team, however, it was Wexford who dominated the early years of the provincial championship.

In 1971, Purcell won his first Leinster title, however, in spite of an outstanding display by Eddie Keher, Kilkenny lost to Tipperary in the All-Ireland final. In 1972, Purcell won a second Leinster title before helping Kilkenny to defeat Cork in the subsequent final to win his first All-Ireland medal. 1973 saw Purcell win another Leinster medal, however, Kilkenny were defeated by Limerick in the All-Ireland final. Purcell missed that game because of appendicitis, however, he was introduced as a substitute. The Kilkenny team quickly regrouped to win back-to-back Leinster and All-Ireland titles in 1974 and 1975, with Purcell winning back-to-back All-Star awards also.
