= Knockmoylan GAA =

Gaelic games club in County Kilkenny, Ireland

Knockmoylan
- Cnoc Maoláin
- County: Kilkenny
- Grounds: Knockmoylan

Senior Club Championships
	All Ireland	Leinster champions	Kilkenny champions
Hurling:	0	0	0

Knockmoylan GAA was a Gaelic Athletic Association club located in Knockmoylan, County Kilkenny, Ireland. The club was primarily concerned with the game of hurling.

== History ==
Located in the southern part of the parish of Ballyhale, the Knockmoylan cub spent much of its existence operating in the junior grade. The club had its most successful period between 1919 and 1932 when four Southern Kilkenny JHC titles were won. Knockmoylan achieved senior status for the first time in 1926 when they won the Kilkenny JHC title after a defeat of Conahy in the final.

Knockmoylan went into a period of decline following this, as three clubs - Knocktopher, Knockmoylan and Ballyhale - all operated within the one parish. Despite some opposition, Knocktopher and Ballyhale eventually joined to form Ballyhale Shamrocks in January 1972. Knockmoylan, who by that stage were defunct, were remembered on the crest of the new club as the initials 'KKB' were included on a shamrock motif.

== Honours ==
- Kilkenny Junior Hurling Championship (1): 1926
- Southern Kilkenny Junior Hurling Championship (4): 1919, 1925, 1926, 1932

== Notable player ==
- Bob Aylward: All-Ireland SHC-winner (1939)
