= Richie Doyle =

Irish hurler

Personal information
- Native name: Risteard Ó Dúil (Irish)
- Born: 28 July 1991 (age 35) Goresbridge, County Kilkenny, Ireland
- Occupation: Student
- Height: 6 ft 0 in (183 cm)

Sport
- Sport: Hurling
- Position: Left Half Back
Club
- Years: Club
- 2008-present: Barrow Rangers
Club titles
- Kilkenny titles: 0
Inter-county*
Years	County	Apps (scores)
2011-present	Kilkenny	1 (0-00)
Inter-county titles
- Leinster titles: 1
- All-Irelands: 1
- NHL: 1
- All Stars: 0
- *Inter County team apps and scores correct as of 12:39, 26 June 2012.

Richard "Richie" Doyle (born 28 July 1991) is an Irish hurler who currently plays as a substitute wing-back for the Kilkenny senior team.

Doyle made his first appearance for the team during the 2011 National League, however, he remained as a substitute for the subsequent championship. In his debut season he won an All-Ireland winner's medals and a Leinster winner's medal as a non-playing substitute.

At club level Doyle plays for the local Barrow Rangers club.
