= Leinster Junior Club Hurling Championship =

Annual hurling competition in Leinster, Ireland

- Irish: Craobh Iomána Clubanna Sóisearach Laighean
- Code: Hurling
- Founded: 2000; 26 years ago
- Region: Leinster (GAA)
- No. of teams: 13
- Title holders: Tullogher–Rosbercon (2nd title)
- Sponsors: Allied Irish Bank
- Motto: The toughest of them all
- Official website: Official website

The Leinster Junior Club Hurling Championship (known for sponsorship reasons as the AIB Leinster GAA Hurling Junior Club Championship) is an annual hurling competition organised by the Leinster Council of the Gaelic Athletic Association and contested by the various champion clubs from the province of Leinster. It is the most prestigious competition for junior clubs in Leinster hurling.

The Leinster Junior Club Championship was introduced in 2000. In its current format, the championship begins in late October and is usually played over a six-week period. The participating club teams compete in a straight knockout competition that culminates with the Leinster final for the two remaining teams. The winner of the Leinster Junior Championship qualifies for the subsequent All-Ireland Club Championship.

Kilkenny clubs have accumulated the highest number of victories with 16 wins. Wexford side Davidstown-Courtnacuddy are the reigning champions, having beaten Clane from Kildare by 3-12 to 0-11 in the 2025 final.

== Teams ==
=== Qualification ===
County	Championship	Qualifying team
Dublin	Dublin Junior A Hurling Championship	Champions
Kildare	Kildare Senior B Hurling Championship	Champions
Kilkenny	Kilkenny Premier Junior Hurling Championship	Champions
Laois	Laois Intermediate Hurling Championship	Champions
Louth	Louth Senior Hurling Championship	Champions
Offaly	Offaly Intermediate Hurling Championship	Champions
Westmeath	Westmeath Intermediate Hurling Championship	Champions
Wexford	Wexford Intermediate A Hurling Championship	Champions

== List of Finals ==
=== List of Leinster JHC finals ===
Year	Winners			Runners-up		
Year	County	Club	Score	County	Club	Score
2025	WEX	Davidstown-Courtnacuddy	3-12	KLD	Clane	0-11
2024	KIL	St Lachtain's	3-08	WEX	Liam Mellows	2-10
2023	KIL	Tullogher–Rosbercon	2–14	OFF	Carrig & Riverstown	0–08
2022	WEX	Horeswood	1–18	DUB	Commercials	3–11
2021	KIL	Mooncoin	4–13	OFF	Shamrocks	0–15
2020	No Championship					
2019	KIL	Conahy Shamrocks	4–13	WEX	Ballygarrett-Réalt na Mara	3–12
2018	KIL	Dunnamaggin	3–17	MEA	Na Fianna	1–11
2017	WEX	Fethard St Mogues	1–17	KIL	John Locke's	2–11
2016	KIL	Mooncoin	1–16	MEA	Ratoath	0–12
2015	KIL	Glenmore	0–23	OFF	Lusmagh	0–13
2014	KIL	Bennettsbridge	1–20	OFF	Shamrocks	0–03
2013	OFF	Ballinamere	2–08	KIL	Lisdowney	0–13
2012	KIL	Thomastown	2–13	MEA	Rathmolyon	1–07
2011	KIL	St Patrick's	0–20	LAO	Ballyfin	1–07
2010	KIL	John Locke's	2–14	OFF	Drumcullen	0–04
2009	KIL	Blacks and Whites	2–20	DUB	Naomh Fionnbarra	1–07
2008	KIL	Tullogher–Rosbercon	1–19	WEX	Clongeen	3–08
2007	KIL	Conahy Shamrocks	3–10	WES	Castlepollard	1–04
2006	KIL	Danesfort	4–11	LOU	Knockbridge	1–05
2005	CAR	Erin's Own	3–14	KIL	Thomastown	3–09
2004	KIL	Galmoy	0–14	LAO	Trumera	0–08
2003	KIL	Piltown	1–15	DUB	St Vincents	1–08
2002	KIL	Blacks and Whites	4–08	DUB	Kevin's	3–07
2001	WES	St Oliver Plunkett's	3–08	KIL	Emeralds	1–11
2000	WEX	Askamore Kilrush	1–13	MEA	Boardsmill	0–11

== Roll of honour ==
=== By club ===
#	Club	County	Titles	Runners-up	Years won	Years runners-up
1	Blacks and Whites	KIL	2	0	2002, 2009	—
1	Conahy Shamrocks	KIL	2	0	2007, 2019	—
1	Mooncoin	KIL	2	0	2016, 2021	—
1	Tullogher–Rosbercon	KIL	2	0	2008, 2024	—
5	John Locke's	KIL	1	1	2010	2017
5	Thomastown	KIL	1	1	2012	2005
5	Askamore Kilrush	WEX	1	0	2000	—
5	St Oliver Plunkett's	WES	1	0	2001	—
5	Piltown	KIL	1	0	2003	—
5	Galmoy	KIL	1	0	2004	—
5	Erin's Own	CAR	1	0	2005	—
5	Danesfort	KIL	1	0	2006	—
5	St Patrick's	KIL	1	0	2011	—
5	Ballinamere	OFF	1	0	2013	—
5	Bennettsbridge	KIL	1	0	2014	—
5	Glenmore	KIL	1	0	2015	—
5	Fethard St Mogues	WEX	1	0	2017	—
5	Dunnamaggin	KIL	1	0	2018	—
5	Davidstown-Courtnacuddy	WEX	1	0	2025	—
5	Horeswood	WEX	1	0	2022	—
20	Shamrocks	OFF	0	2	—	2014, 2021
20	Boardsmill	MEA	0	1	—	2000
20	Emeralds	KIL	0	1	—	2001
20	Kevin's	DUB	0	1	—	2002
20	St Vincents	DUB	0	1	—	2003
20	Trumera	LAO	0	1	—	2004
20	Knockbridge	LOU	0	1	—	2006
20	Castlepollard	WES	0	1	—	2007
20	Clongeen	WEX	0	1	—	2008
20	Naomh Fionnbarra	DUB	0	1	—	2009
20	Drumcullen	OFF	0	1	—	2010
20	Ballyfin	LAO	0	1	—	2011
20	Rathmolyon	MEA	0	1	—	2012
20	Lisdowney	KIL	0	1	—	2013
20	Lusmagh	OFF	0	1	—	2015
20	Ratoath	MEA	0	1	—	2016
20	Na Fianna	MEA	0	1	—	2018
20	Ballygarrett-Réalt na Mara	WEX	0	1	—	2019
20	Commercials	DUB	0	1	—	2022
20	Clane	KIL	0	1	—	2025

=== By county ===
County	Titles	Runners-up	Total
Kilkenny	18	4	22
Wexford	4	3	6
Offaly	1	5	6
Westmeath	1	1	2
Carlow	1	0	1
Meath	0	4	4
Dublin	0	4	4
Laois	0	2	2
Louth	0	1	1
Kildare	0	1	1

==== Winning years per county ====
#	County	Wins	Runners-up	Winning years	Years Runners-Up
1	Kilkenny	18	4	2002, 2003, 2004, 2006, 2007, 2008, 2009, 2010, 2011, 2012, 2014, 2015, 2016, 2018, 2019, 2021, 2023, 2024	2001, 2005, 2013, 2017
2	Wexford	4	3	2000, 2017, 2022, 2025	2008, 2019, 2024
3	Offaly	1	5	2013	2010, 2014, 2015, 2021, 2023
3	Westmeath	1	1	2001	2007
3	Carlow	1	0	2005	—
6	Meath	0	4	—	2000, 2012, 2016, 2018
6	Dublin	0	4	—	2002, 2003, 2009, 2022
6	Laois	0	2	—	2004, 2011
6	Louth	0	1	—	2006
6	Kildare	0	1	—	2025

== Special Junior Hurling Championship ==
=== Qualification ===
County	Championship	Qualifying team
Europe	Europe Premier (15s) Hurling Championship	Champions
Longford	Longford Senior Hurling Championship	Champions
Meath	Meath Intermediate Hurling Championship	Champions
Wicklow	Wicklow Intermediate Hurling Championship	Champions

=== Roll of Honour ===
==== By Club ====
Year	Winner	County	Score	Opponent	County	Score
2025	Amsterdam GAC	Europe	0-15	Longford Slashers	Longford	0-14
2016-2024	no championship					
2015	Ballypickas	Laois	0-12	Broadford	Kildare	0-05
2014	Clara	Offaly	2-18	Wolfe Tones (Mostrim)	Longford	0-05
2013	Castleknock	Dublin	2-15	Mountmellick	Laois	1-07
2012	Clanna Gael/Fontenoy	Dublin	2-09	Knockbridge	Louth	2-06
2011	Park/Ratheniska	Laois	2-10	Parnells	Dublin	1-08
2010	Fingallians	Dublin	0-13	Wolfe Tones	Meath	1-08
2009	St. Sylvester's	Dublin	2-11	Edenderry	Offaly	1-07
2008	Naomh Barróg	Dublin	1-11	Ratoath	Meath	0-08
2007	Killurin	Offaly	3-11	Park/Ratheniska	Laois	0-11

==== By county ====
County	Titles	Runners-up	Total
Offaly	2	1	3
Europe	1	0	1
Meath	0	2	2
Dublin	4	1	5
Laois	2	2	4
Longford	0	2	2
Kildare	0	1	1

== See also ==
- Leinster Senior Club Hurling Championship (Tier 1)
- Leinster Intermediate Club Hurling Championship (Tier 2)
- All-Ireland Junior Club Hurling Championship
