= Kilmacow GAA =

Kilmacow GAA club is situated in the village of Kilmacow. The club has a hurling team which competes in the Junior Hurling Championship. They have won the Kilkenny Junior Hurling Championship once in 1956 when the club was known then as St.Senan's GAA. Kilmacow also have a Camogie club ranging from Under-8s to Juniors, they are amalgamated with Slieverue at Intermediate and Under-22 level and are named St.Claires Camogie club.

In the early days of Kilkenny GAA, senior winning club teams represented the county team in the All-Ireland Senior Championships. In 1888, Kilmacow were the county champions and went on to represent Kilkenny in the All-Ireland championship 1888, they won the Leinster senior football championship beating Castlebridge of Wexford by 1-4 to 0-2 on 23 September 1888 in New Ross.

== Honours ==
=== Hurling ===
- Kilkenny Junior Hurling Championship: (1) 1956
- Kilkenny Junior 'B' Hurling Championship: (1) 2012
- Kilkenny Junior 'B' Hurling League: (1) 2000

=== Gaelic Football ===
- Kilkenny Senior Football Championship: (2) 1887, 1888
