= Kilkenny Premier Junior Hurling Championship =

- Current season or competition: 2026 Kilkenny Premier Junior Hurling Championship
- Irish: Craobh Iomána Príomh-Shóisear Chill Chainnigh
- Code: Hurling
- Founded: 1905; 121 years ago
- Region: Kilkenny (GAA)
- Trophy: Bob Aylward Cup
- No. of teams: 22
- Title holders: Conahy Shamrocks (4th title)
- Most titles: Mooncoin (7 titles)
- Sponsors: JJ Kavanagh & Sons
- Official website: Official website

The Kilkenny Premier Junior Hurling Championship (known for sponsorship reasons as the JJ Kavanagh & Sons Premier Junior Hurling Championship and abbreviated to the Kilkenny PJHC) is an annual hurling competition organised by the Kilkenny County Board of the Gaelic Athletic Association and contested by the top-ranking junior clubs in the county of Kilkenny in Ireland. It is the third tier overall in the entire Kilkenny hurling championship system.

Introduced in 1905 as the Kilkenny Junior Hurling Championship for teams deemed not eligible for the senior grade or second-string senior teams, it eventually became a divisional competition with the North and South champions playing each other for the county title. At the time of its creation it was the second tier of Kilkenny hurling. The competition took on its current name in 2022, when the entire junior hurling championship system was reformed.

In its current format, the Kilkenny Premier Junior Championship is played across the autumn months. The participating teams are split into Section A and Section B and engage in a knockout competition that culminates with the final at UPMC Nowlan Park.

Mooncoin is the most successful team in the tournament's history, having won it seven times. Conahy Shamrocks are the current champions after beating Graignamanagh in the 2026 final.

== History ==
The Kilkenny Junior Championship was established in 1905 in an effort to provide meaningful competition for the increased number of teams that had been created in Kilkenny. It remained the second tier of Kilkenny hurling until the creation of the Kilkenny Intermediate Championship in 1929. For over a century, the Kilkenny Junior Championship was played on a divisional basis. Individual junior championships were organised by the North Board and the South Board, with the two winners playing off for the county title. This format was replaced by a countywide championship in 2011. The competition was rebranded as the Kilkenny Premier Junior Hurling Championship in 2022.

== Format ==
=== Section A ===
12 teams participate in Section A. It comprises junior-grade clubs represented by their first-team panels. A teams finishing position in the Kilkenny Premier Junior Hurling League determines at what stage they enter the championship. Three teams from this section qualify for the Combined Section.

Round 1: The eight teams ranked 3–6 in the two league groups contest this round. Four matches are played with two winning teams advancing to Round 2 and the other two winning teams receiving byes to the quarter-finals.

Round 2: The two teams ranked in second place in the two league groups and two round 1-winning teams contest this round. Two matches are played with the two winning teams advancing to the quarter-finals.

Quarter-finals: The league finalists, two winning teams from Round 1 and two winning teams from Round 2 contest this round. Three matches are played with the three winning teams progressing to the Combined Section.

=== Section B ===
11 teams participate in Section B. It comprises senior and intermediate-grade clubs represented by their second-team panels. One team from this section qualify for the Combined Section.

Preliminary round: Six teams drawn at random contest this round. Two matches are played with two winning teams advancing to the quarter-finals.

Quarter-finals: The three preliminary round winners and five other teams contest this round. Four matches are played with the four winning teams advancing to the semi-finals.

Semi-finals: The four quarter-final winners contest this round. Two matches are played with the two winning teams advancing to the final.

Final: The two semi-final winners contest the final. The winning team are declared section champions and progress to the Combined Section.

=== Combined section ===
Semi-finals: Four teams qualify for this section; the three Section A quarter-final winners and the Section B winners. Two matches are played with the two winning teams advancing to the final.

Final: The two semi-final winners contest the final. The winning team are declared champions.

== 2026 Teams ==
The 23 teams competing in the 2026 Kilkenny Premier Junior Hurling Championship are:

Team	Location	Colours	Championship section	Championship titles	Last championship title
Clara	Clara	Maroon and white	B	2	1977
Cloneen	Cloneen	Green and white	A	0	—
Conahy Shamrocks	Conahy	Black and yellow	A	4	2026
Dicksboro	Palmerstown	Maroon and white	B	3	1919
Emeralds	Urlingford	Green and white	A	1	2001
Erin's Own	Castlecomer	Blue and white	B	1	1958
Fenians Johnstown	Johnstown	White and blue	A	1	1968
Galmoy	Galmoy	Blue and white	A	3	2004
Graignamanagh	Graiguenamanagh	Green and white	A	1	1972
James Stephens	Kilkenny	Green and red	B	4	2000
John Locke's	Callan	Saffron and blue	A	4	2017
Kilmacow	Kilmacow	Green and white	A	0	—
Lisdowney	Lisdowney	Blue and white	B	2	2013
Mooncoin	Mooncoin	Green and white	B	7	2021
O'Loughlin Gaels	St John's Parish	White and green	B	3	2019
Piltown	Pilltown	Amber and black	A	3	2003
Rower–Inistioge	Inistioge	Green and red	B	2	1963
Slieverue	Slieverue	Black and amber	A	1	1950
St Patrick's	Ballyragget	Maroon and white	A	2	2011
Tullaroan	Tullaroan	Green and white	B	1	1983
Thomastown	Thomastown	Blue and white	B	5	2012
Windgap	Windgap	Red and white	A	2	1986
Young Irelands	Gowran	Red and white	B	1	1964

== Qualification for subsequent competitions ==
The Kilkenny Premier Junior Championship winners quality for the subsequent Leinster Junior Club Hurling Championship. Kilkenny clubs have dominated the competition and have won a total of 17 titles from the competition's inception in 2000.

== Trophy ==
The winning team is presented with the Bob Aylward Cup. Born in Mullinavat, County Kilkenny, Bob Aylward (1911–1974) was part of the Kilkenny senior hurling team that won the All-Ireland SHC title in 1939. He later served as chairman of the Kilkenny County Board and was a member of Seanad Éireann until his death.

== Sponsorship ==
JJ Kavanagh & Sons have been the long-time sponsors of the Kilkenny Premier Junior Hurling Championship.

== Roll of honour ==
#	Club	Titles	Championships won	Lost	Championships Lost
1	Mooncoin	7	1908, 1920, 1937, 1942, 1961, 2016, 2021	3	1911, 1914, 2014
2	Tullogher Rosbercon	6	1957, 1989, 1992, 1997, 2008, 2023	5	1969, 1977, 2006, 2007, 2021
3	Thomastown	5	1927, 1945, 1962, 2005, 2012	5	1924, 1959, 1964, 1973, 2004
3	Glenmore	5	1923, 1953, 1980, 1991, 2015	1	1968
5	John Locke's	4	1911, 1987, 2010, 2017	6	1947, 1951, 1982, 1985, 2009, 2016
5	Mullinavat	4	1915, 1916, 1939, 1984	3	1938, 1974, 1978
5	Carrickshock	4	1928, 1954, 1979, 1999	3	1975, 1976, 1998
5	Bennettsbridge	4	1935, 1948, 1951, 2014	3	2005, 2012, 2013
5	Blacks & Whites	4	1998, 2002, 2009, 2022	2	1992, 1994
5	Conahy Shamrocks	4	1976, 2007, 2020, 2026	2	1926, 2019
5	James Stephens	4	1924, 1929, 1955, 2000	1	1943
5	Barrow Rangers	4	1982, 1988, 1990, 2025	1	2010
13	Galmoy	3	1949, 1966, 2004	9	1931, 1937, 1952, 1954, 1963, 1965, 1987, 1989, 1997
13	Dicksboro	3	1910, 1914, 1919	4	1916, 1923, 1996, 2020
13	Piltown	3	1981, 1996, 2003	4	1995, 2000, 2011, 2018
13	O'Loughlin Gaels	3	1975, 1995, 2019	3	1927, 2017, 2025
13	St Lachtain's	3	1959, 1993, 2024	2	1991, 2023
13	Danesfort	3	1925, 1930, 2006	2	1944, 1986
19	Knocktopher	2	1931, 1965	6	1919, 1949, 1955, 1958, 1960, 1967
19	Windgap	2	1970, 1986	3	2001, 2022, 2024
19	Graigue-Ballycallan	2	1946, 1985	2	1970, 1979
19	Lisdowney	2	1960, 2013	2	1942, 2008
19	Dunnamaggin	2	1994, 2018	1	1966
19	North Selection	2	1932, 1934	1	1933
19	St Patrick's, Ballyraggett	2	1978, 2011	1	2003
19	Rower-Instioge	2	1944, 1963	0	
19	Clara	2	1969, 1977	0	
28	St Senan's, Kilmacow	1	1956	4	1990, 1993, 2002, 2015
28	Emeralds	1	2001	4	1972, 1981, 1984, 1999
28	Slieverue	1	1950	3	1935, 1948, 1988
28	South Selection	1	1933	2	1932, 1934
28	Coon	1	1967	2	1961, 1962
28	Tullaroan	1	1983	2	1905, 1980
28	Graignamanagh	1	1972	2	1971, 2026
28	Erins Own (City)	1	1906	1	1908
28	Mong	1	1913	1	1910
28	Young Irelands	1	1964	1	1957
28	Ballyhale Shamrocks	1	1973	1	1983
28	Owen Ruas (Urlingford)	1	1905	0	
28	Clonmore	1	1922	0	
28	Eire Og	1	1936	0	
28	Ballyline	1	1938	0	
28	Threecastles	1	1940	0	
28	Hugginstown	1	1941	0	
28	Stoneyford	1	1943	0	
28	Johnstown-Urlingford	1	1947	0	
28	Erin's Own	1	1958	0	
28	Fenians	1	1968	0	
28	Newpark Shamrocks	1	1971	0	
28	Muckalee/Ballyfoyle Rangers	1	1974	0	

== List of finals ==
=== Legend ===
- Gold – All-Ireland Junior Club Champions
- Silver – All-Ireland Junior Club Runners-up
- Brown - Leinster Junior Club Champions

=== List of Kilkenny PJHC finals ===
Year	Winners		Runners-up		#
Year	Club	Score	Club	Score	#
2026	Conahy Shamrocks	0-16	Graignamanagh	1-11	
2025	Barrow Rangers	2-22	O'Loughlin Gaels	3-17	
2024	St Lachtain's	2-15	Windgap	1-12	
2023	Tullogher-Rosbercon	1-19	St Lachtain's	0-17	
2022	Blacks and Whites	1-17	Windgap	0-17	
2021	Mooncoin	3-19	Tullogher-Rosbercon	3-11	
2020	Conahy Shamrocks	3-14	Dicksboro	0-19	
2019	O'Loughlin Gaels	1-17	Conahy Shamrocks	1-15	
2018	Dunnamaggin	1-16	Piltown	2-08	
2017	John Lockes	1-17	O'Loughlin Gaels	0-19	
2016	Mooncoin	2-19	John Lockes	1-08	
2015	Glenmore	1-12	Kilmacow	2-06	
2014	Bennettsbridge	1-17	Mooncoin	1-07	
2013	Lisdowney	2-16	Bennettsbridge	1-18	
2012	Thomastown	3-13	Bennettsbridge	0-10	
2011	St Patrick's, Ballyraggett	0-14	Piltown	1-08	
2010	John Locke's	1-14	Barrow Rangers	0-14	
2009	Blacks and Whites	0-17	John Locke's	2-06	
2008	Tullogher-Rosbercon	2-10	Lisdowney	0-08	
2007	Conahy Shamrocks	0-17	Tullogher-Rosbercon	1-11	
2006	Danesfort	2-12	Tullogher-Rosbercon	2-11	
2005	Thomastown	3-13	Bennettsbridge	1-06	
2004	Galmoy	0-17	Thomastown	1-04	
2003	Piltown	1-11 (2-12)	St Patrick's, Ballyraggett	1-08 (2-12)	
2002	Blacks and Whites	0-10	Kilmacow	1-06	
2001	Emeralds	3-11	Windgap	1-11	
2000	James Stephens	0-10	Piltown	0-07	
1999	Carrickshock	1-06	Emeralds	0-08	
1998	Blacks and Whites	2-11	Carrickshock	0-10	
1997	Tullogher-Rosbercon	0-12	Galmoy	1-08	
1996	Piltown	0-11	Dicksboro	1-03	
1995	O'Loughlin Gaels	2-13	Piltown	1-11	
1994	Dunnamaggin	2-09	Blacks and Whites	1-10	
1993	St Lachtain's	3-14	Kilmacow	1-07	
1992	Tullogher-Rosbercon	2-13	Blacks and Whites	1-10	
1991	Glenmore	3-07	St Lachtain's	0-12	
1990	Barrow Rangers	6-09 (3-05)	Kilmacow	3-10 (2-08)	
1989	Tullogher-Rosbercon	2-15	Galmoy	3-08	
1988	Barrow Rangers	4-12	Slieverue	0-11	
1987	John Locke's	2-17	Galmoy	3-08	
1986	Windgap	1-11	Danesfort	2-01	
1985	Graigue-Ballycallan	1-12	John Locke's	3-04	
1984	Mullinavat	3-09	Emeralds	1-05	
1983	Tullaroan	2-10	Ballyhale Shamrocks	2-09	
1982	Barrow Rangers	0-12	John Locke's	0-06	
1981	Piltown	3-06	Emeralds	2-06	
1980	Glenmore	3-16	Tullaroan	2-06	
1979	Carrickshock	3-11	Graigue-Ballycallan	2-07	
1978	St Patrick's, Ballyraggett	4-06	Mullinavat	1-05	
1977	Clara	3-12	Tullogher-Rosbercon	2-04	
1976	Conahy Shamrocks	1-12	Carrickshock	0-08	
1975	O'Loughlin Gaels	2-10	Carrickshock	2-03	
1974	Muckalee/Ballyfoyle Rangers	4-17	Mullinavat	3-03	
1973	Ballyhale Shamrocks	2-12	Thomastown	2-07	
1972	Graignamanagh	2-12	Emeralds	3-05	
1971	Newpark Shamrocks	1-11	Graignamanagh	2-03	
1970	Windgap	W/O	Graigue-Ballycallan	Scratch	
1969	Clara	1-17	Tullogher-Rosbercon	2-06	
1968	Fenians	5-08	Glenmore	3-04	
1967	Coon	5-11	Knocktopher	1-02	
1966	Galmoy	6-04	Dunnamaggin	1-10	
1965	Knocktopher	4-17	Galmoy	4-08	
1964	Young Irelands	9-07	Thomastown Rangers	1-03	
1963	Rower-Instiogue	6,02, 2-11 (R)	Galmoy	7-03, 1-07 (R)	
1962	Thomastown	7-09	Coon	4-04	
1961	Mooncoin	4-11	Coon	2-02	
1960	Lisdowney	3-08	Knocktopher	2-05	
1959	St Lactain's	4-07	Thomastown	4-02	
1958	Erin's Own	3-10	Knocktopher	2-04	
1957	Tullogher-Rosbercon	4-04	Young Irelands	1-03	
1956	St Senan's, Kilmacow	6-09	St Finbarr's, Castleinch	4-06	
1955	James Stephens	4-04	Knocktopher	1-06	
1954	Carrickshock	3-06	Galmoy	4-02	
1953	Glenmore	6-04	Foulkstown	2-05	
1952	John Locke's	4-04	Galmoy/Urlingford	2-01	
1951	Bennettsbridge	7-02	John Locke's	5-02	
1950	Slieverue	4-06	Urlingford	5-02	
1949	Galmoy	4-08	Knocktopher	2-04	
1948*	Bennettsbridge	2-01, 6-03 (R)	Slieverue	3-06, 2-06	
1947	Johnstown-Urlingford	4-04, 6-05 (R)	John Locke's	4-04, 2-02 (R)	
1946	Graigue	8-05	St Kieran's, Clogga	3-00	
1945	Thomastown	4-05	St Rioch's	5-00	
1944	The Rower	4-06	Danesfort	4-03	
1943	Stoneyford	2-08	James Stephens	2-01	
1942	Mooncoin	6-04	Lisdowney	3-02	
1941	Hugginstown	2-07, 4-08 (R)	Horse & Jockey	3-04, 3-03 (R)	
1940	Threecastles	5-02	Killarney	0-01	
1939	Mullinavat	5-00	Freshford	3-01	
1938	Ballyline	3-05	Mullinavat	2-04	
1937	Mooncoin	4-06	Horse & Jockey (Galmoy)	4-04	
1936	Eire Og	6-02	Moonrue	4-00	
1935	Bennettsbridge	7-03	Slieverue	3-06	
1934	North Selection	3-02	South Selection	1-03	
1933	South Selection	5-02	North Selection	3-04	
1932	North Selection	2-04	South Selection	2-02	
1931	Knocktopher	9-04	Galmoy	2-03	
1930	Danesfort	3-02, 6-02 (R)	Crowraddie	2-03, 3-03 (R)	
1929*	James Stephens	3-00, 4-05 (R)	Dunkitt	5-01, 0-01 (R)	
1928	Carrickshock	2-03	Wellbrook (Freshford)	1-02	
1927	Thomastown	4-02	O'Loughlin Gaels	4-01	
1926	Knockmoylan	3-05	Conahy	3-00	
1925*	Danesfort	4-01	Knockmoylan	5-01	
1924	James Stephens	5-01, 5-05 (R)	Thomastown	5-01, 1-00 (R)	
1923	Glenmore	1-04	Dicksboro	1-01	
1922	Clonmore	6-02, 6-02 (R)	Clomanto	3-00, 0-03 (R)	
1921	No Championship				
1920*	Mooncoin	1-01, 3-02, 2-04	Tulla	5-01, 2-05, 1-03	
1919*	Dicksboro	5-02 (Unfinished)	Knocktopher	0-04	
1917–1918	No Championship				
1916	Mullinavat	2-04	Dicksboro	1-02	
1915	Mullinavat	2-04	Horse & Jockey	0-01	
1914	Dicksboro	6-02	Mooncoin	4-01	
1913	Mong (on objection)	1-01	Ballycloven	3-03	
1912	No Championship				
1911	John Locke's	7-01	Mooncoin	1-00	
1910	Dicksboro	2-02	Mong	2-00	
1909	No Championship				
1908	Suirside Rovers (Mooncoin)	3-14	Erin's Own (City)	1-04	
1907	No Championship				
1906	Erin's Own (City)	9-20	John O'Leary's (City)	1-01	
1905	Owen Ruas (Urlingford)	1-11	Tullaroan	2-07	

=== Notes ===
- 1925: Danesfort awarded title after objection
- 1929: First game was unfinished due to heavy rain
- 1930: Replay ordered following an objection
- 1948: Replay ordered following an objection
- 1963: Reply ordered following an objection
