= Blacks and Whites GAA =

Gaelic games club in County Kilkenny, Ireland

Blacks and Whites
- Cumann Dubh agus Bána
- Founded: 1925
- County: Kilkenny
- Colours: Black and white
- Grounds: Tom Walsh Park

Playing kits
Standard colours

Senior Club Championships
	All Ireland	Leinster champions	Kilkenny champions
Football:	0	0	1
Hurling:	0	0	0

Blacks and Whites GAA is a Gaelic Athletic Association club located in Skeoughvosteen, County Kilkenny, Ireland. The club was founded in 1927 and fields teams in both Gaelic football and hurling.

== Achievements ==
- All-Ireland Junior Club Hurling Championship Runners-Up 2003
- Leinster Junior Club Hurling Championship Winners 2002, 2009
- Kilkenny Junior Hurling Championship Winners 1998, 2002, 2009, 2022; Runners-Up 1992, 1994
- Kilkenny Senior Club Football Championship Winners 1932

== Notable players ==
- Thomas Walsh
- Peter "Chap" Cleere
