= Slieverue GAA =

Gaelic games club in County Kilkenny, Ireland

Slieverue
- Sliabh Rua
- Founded: 1884
- County: Kilkenny
- Colours: Black and amber
- Grounds: Páirc CLG Sliabh Rua

Playing kits
Standard colours

Senior Club Championships
	All Ireland	Leinster champions	Kilkenny champions
Hurling:	0	0	1

Slieverue GAA is a Gaelic Athletic Association club located in Slieverue, County Kilkenny, Ireland. The club fields teams in hurling and Gaelic football.

== History ==
Slieverue is one of Kilkenny's oldest clubs, having affiliated in the GAA's foundation year in 1884. The club has operated in the junior ranks for much of its existence, however, it has had some success in the upper tiers. Slieverue's first major success was a Kilkenny IHC title in 1936. The Kilkenny JHC was secured in 1950, a victory which heralded further success over the rest of the decade. Slieverue contested three Kilkenny SHC finals, with the club beating Tullaroan to claim their only title in 1954.

== Honours ==
- Kilkenny Senior Hurling Championship: (1) 1954
- Kilkenny Intermediate Hurling Championship: (1) 1936
- Kilkenny Junior Hurling Championship: (1) 1950

== Notable players ==
- Paddy Buggy: All-Ireland SHC-winner (1957) and GAA President (1982–1985)
- Locky Byrne: All-Ireland SHC-winner (1935)
- Bill Cahill: All-Ireland SHC-winner (1947)
- Dick Rockett: All-Ireland SHC-winner (1957)
- Mick Walsh: All-Ireland SHC-winner (1957)
