= Barrow Rangers GAA =

Hurling club, based in Paulstown and Gorebridge, Ireland

Barrow Rangers
- Raonaithe Bhearbhaithe
- Founded: 1906
- County: Kilkenny
- Colours
- Grounds: Páirc an Phobail
- Coordinates: 52.6829399°N 7.0279222°W

Playing kits
Standard colours

Barrow Rangers GAA is a Gaelic Athletic Association club in Paulstown, County Kilkenny, Ireland. The club is affiliated to the Kilkenny County Board and is primarily concerned with the game of hurling.

== History ==
Located in the village of Paulstown, on the Carlow–Kilkenny border, Barrow Rangers GAA Club was founded in 1906. The club has spent most of its existence operating in the junior grades, winning three Kilkenny JHC titles between 1982 and 1990. That year, Barrow Rangers also claimed the first of two Kilkenny IFC titles. After returning to the junior ranks in both codes, the club won a Kilkenny JFC title in 2022, as well as a Kilkenny PJHC title in 2025.

== Honours ==
- Kilkenny Senior Football Championship (1): 1965
- Kilkenny Intermediate Football Championship (1): 1990, 1993
- Kilkenny Premier Junior Hurling Championship (4): 1982, 1988, 1990, 2025
- Kilkenny Junior Football Championship (1): 2022
- Kilkenny Junior B Hurling Championship (2): 2014, 2023

== Notable players ==
- Richie Doyle: All-Ireland SHC–winner (2011, 2012)
