= Galmoy GAA =

GAA club in Galmoy, County Kilkenny, Ireland

Galmoy
- Gabhalmhaigh
- Founded: 1929
- County: Kilkenny
- Colours: Blue and white
- Grounds: Galmoy

Playing kits
Standard colours

Galmoy GAA is a Gaelic Athletic Association club in Galmoy, County Kilkenny, Ireland. It is located on the Laois-Kilkenny border, and neighbours the village of Cullohill in County Laois. The club is primarily concerned with the game of hurling, but also produces very successful handball players.

== History ==
Located in the village of Galmoy, on the Laois-Kilkenny border, Galmoy GAA Club was founded in December 1929. The club has spent most of its existence operating in the junior grade, winning three Kilkenny JHC titles and 13 divisional titles. A brief period in the Kilkenny SHC saw the club lose to James Stephens in the 1975 final. Galmoy defeated Oran to become the first Kilkenny winners of the All-Ireland Junior Club Championship in 2005. Due to low numbers in 2006, Galmoy's underage teams amalgamated with Windgap and won the 'B' League that year. They are currently still amalgamated at U14, U16, Minor and U21 Level and continue to do well winning multiple league and championship titles. In May 2023, Galmoy defeated Slieverue to win their first ever Leinster Club Hurling Division 2 League Title in Nowlan Park.

== Honours ==
- All-Ireland Junior Club Hurling Championship (1): 2005
- Leinster Junior Club Hurling Championship (1): 2004
- Kilkenny Junior Hurling Championship (3): 1949, 1966, 2004
- Northern Kilkenny Junior Hurling Championship (13): 1931, 1949, 1952, 1954, 1963, 1965, 1966, 1987, 1989, 1997, 2004, 2013, 2015
- Leinster Club Hurling League Division 2 (1) 2023

== Notable players ==
- Billy Drennan: All-Ireland U20HC-winner (2022)
