= St Lachtain's GAA =

Gaelic games club in County Kilkenny, Ireland

St Lachtain's
- Naomh Lachtáin
- Founded: 1951
- County: Kilkenny
- Colours: Black and amber
- Grounds: Páirc Lachtáin
- Coordinates: 52°43′52″N 7°23′42″W

Playing kits
Standard colours

Senior Club Championships
	All Ireland	Leinster champions	Kilkenny champions
Hurling:	0	0	2
Camogie:	3	6	12

St Lachtain's GAA is a Gaelic Athletic Association club located in Freshford, County Kilkenny, Ireland. Founded in 1951, it is almost exclusively concerned with the game of hurling. The club has won All-Ireland club titles in hurling (at Junior and Intermediate level) and in camogie (at senior level).

== History ==
Located in the village of Freshford, St Lachtain's GAA Club was founded in 1951. The new club spent its early years operating in the junior ranks, eventually winning the Kilkenny JHC title in 1959 and securing senior status. Within two years in the top flight, St Lachtain's claimed their first ever Kilkenny SHC title after beating representative side Near South. A second SHC followed in 1963 after a defeat of Tullogher.

St Lachtain's subsequently slipped out of the top flight and down the ranks but continued to collect silverware. A second Kilkenny JHC title was won in 1993, while Kilkenny IHC titles were claimed in 1984 and 2009. The latter title was later converted into a Leinster Club IHC title, while the All-Ireland Club IHC title was won after a 3-17 to 0-10 defeat of St Gall's.

In camogie, the club has won several county, provincial and All-Ireland titles, including back-to-back All-Ireland Senior Club Camogie Championship from 2004 to 2006.

== Honours ==
=== Hurling ===
- All-Ireland Intermediate Club Hurling Championship: 2010
- All-Ireland Junior Club Hurling Championship: 2025
- Leinster Intermediate Club Hurling Championship: 2009
- Leinster Junior Club Hurling Championship: 2024
- Kilkenny Senior Hurling Championship: 1961, 1963
- Kilkenny Intermediate Hurling Championship: 1984, 2009
- Kilkenny Premier Junior Hurling Championship: 1959, 1993, 2024
- Kilkenny Under-21 Hurling Championship: 1977, 2012
- Kilkenny Minor Hurling Championship: 1955, 1977

=== Camogie ===
- All-Ireland Senior Club Camogie Championship: 2004, 2005, 2006
- Leinster Senior Club Camogie Championship: 1999, 2003, 2004, 2005, 2006, 2007
- Kilkenny Senior Camogie Championship: 1998, 1999, 2000, 2001, 2003, 2004, 2005, 2006, 2007, 2008, 2009, 2011

== Notable players ==
- Seán Buckley: All-Ireland SHC-winner (1963, 1969)
- Anne Dalton: winner of five Camogie All Stars Awards
- Pa Dillon: All-Ireland SHC-winner (1963, 1967, 1969, 1972)
- Alfie Hickey: All-Ireland SHC-winner (1963)
- Michael Kavanagh: All-Ireland SHC-winner (2000, 2002, 2003, 2006, 2007, 2008, 2009, 2011)
- Imelda Kennedy: Camogie All-Star in 2006
- John Teehan: All-Ireland SHC-winner (1967)
