= JJ Kavanagh and Sons =

Irish private coach operator

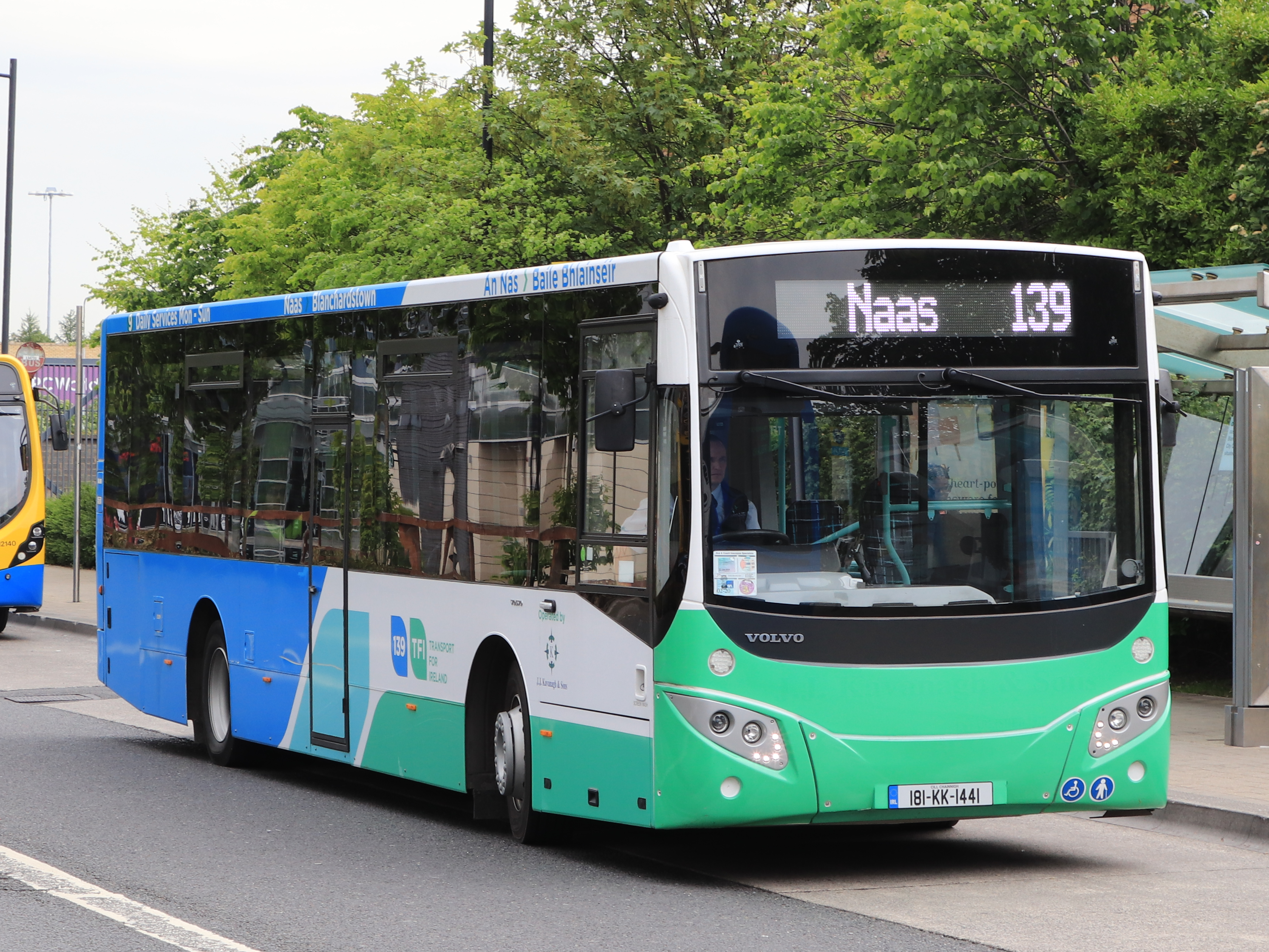
- Founded: 1919
- Headquarters: Urlingford, County Kilkenny, Ireland
- Service area: Ireland; United Kingdom
- Destinations: Dublin; Dublin Airport; Limerick; Clonmel; Kilkenny; Waterford; Watford; Carlow; Naas
- Hubs: Urlingford; Waterford; Nenagh; Clonmel; Naas
- Website: jjkavanagh.ie

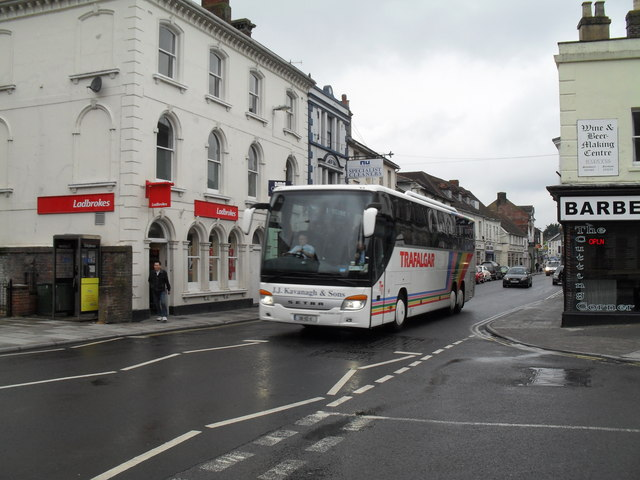
Setra coach in Salisbury, Wiltshire

JJ Kavanagh and Sons is Ireland's largest private coach operator. It was founded in 1919 by J.J. Kavanagh with the operation of a service connecting Urlingford with Kilkenny City.

The company has expanded greatly since the 1990s with the take-over of Kenneally's coach operators in Waterford. Its head office is in Urlingford, County Kilkenny. There are also offices in Naas, Dublin, Clonmel, Nenagh, Waterford and Carlow.

== History ==
=== Origins and development ===
JJ Kavanagh and Sons was founded in 1919 by James Kavanagh, and his wife Mollie, with the running of a daily coach service between Urlingford and Kilkenny. In the 1940s, the couple's sons took over the business. In the following years, the company expanded with an increase both in fleet size and in number of routes. This included the introduction of an Urlingford - Clonmel route. At the time, the company had a lucrative delivery contract with some of Ireland's largest newspaper companies.

=== Change in market and expansion ===
With the decline in the prominence of the newspaper in Ireland, JJ Kavanagh and Sons lost their delivery deal and were forced to find new sources of income. The business saw rapid expansion from the 1980s onwards as they launched a number of intercity routes. The expansion of intercity routes was made possible for the company as a result of their acquisition of a number of coach companies across the south-east of Ireland in Naas, Nenagh, Waterford and Clonmel as well as the opening of sub-offices in Carlow and Dublin.

In 2011, the company expanded internationally by purchasing Mullany's coaches in Watford, England. This deal was believed to have been in the region of €1 million.

As of 2019, the company reportedly had a workforce of approximately 250 people.

== Services operated ==
The company also operates a number of local bus services, including those in Waterford and Tramore and intercity express services from Dublin Airport and Dublin city to Limerick, Waterford, Clonmel, Carlow and Kilkenny. As of 2019, it had also started a service from Dublin Airport and Dublin city to Naas in County Kildare.

== Fleet ==
The company's coach fleet, which operates on intercity services, is made up of over one hundred Setra 400 series Neoplan Tourliner and Mercedes Tourismo coaches. The feature air conditioning, reclining seats, on-board toilets, seatbelts, USB sockets and audio/visual facilities. The number plate of each bus is made up entirely of number ones.

It was the first coach company in Ireland to introduce free Wi-Fi onto some of its coaches in 2009.

The bus fleet operated by the company on the town and city routes is made up of Mercedes-Benz Citaros.

J. J. Kavanagh & Sons became the first operator of the MCV Evora in Ireland, taking delivery of three examples in early 2018.

== Other works ==
JJ Kavanagh and Sons plays a role in the Kilkenny and Carlow Gaelic Athletic Association (GAA) scene, sponsoring several of the hurling and Gaelic football competitions in the counties. They also sponsor the Kilkenny camogie team.
