= Piltown GAA =

Gaelic Athletic Association club

Piltown
- Baile an Phoill
- Founded: 1953
- County: Kilkenny
- Colours: Amber and Black
- Grounds: Piltown GAA Complex
- Coordinates: 52°21′35″N 7°19′45″W

Playing kits
Standard colours

Senior Club Championships
	All Ireland	Leinster champions	Kilkenny champions
Football:	0	0	0
Hurling:	0	0	0
Ladies' football:	0	0	0
Camogie:	0	0	1

Piltown GAA is a Gaelic Athletic Association club located in Piltown, County Kilkenny, Ireland. A Piltown GAA club was first founded in 1887. Several versions existed until the modern club was founded in 1953. Promising players such as Ben mortiarty and Conor long are expected to bring this country club back to the promise land after years of hurt. This followed the advent of the "parish rule" in Kilkenny in 1952. Piltown primarily facilitate coaching and games in hurling, Gaelic football, camogie and Ladies' Gaelic football with teams from Under-8 to adult in each code.

== History ==
=== Beginnings ===
When the Gaelic Athletic Association was formed in 1884, clubs emerged around the country. Among the first clubs in the Piltown area was John Mandevilles in Templeorum (1880s) as well as a Piltown Club (c.1887).

Kilkenny held its first county convention in the Working Mens Club, Kilkenny on 30 January 1887. Piltown were represented by J.J. Power and Peter O’Donnell. In December 1887, there were two rival conventions with J.J. Power being elected to the committee of the one which was promoting the re-appointment of Maurice Davin as president of the GAA.

In 1888, four clubs affiliated to Kilkenny GAA from Piltown. They were Piltown, Ballyhenebry, Owning and Templeorum (John Mandevilles). The Owning club are believed to have played their games in a field in Fanningstown. J.J. Power was elected to represent the Southern Division on the county board. Harristown was another early club which lasted until the 1940s. Templeorum followed John Mandevilles with a number of other clubs named as "Mountain Stars" and "Star Rangers". Suir Rangers based in Fiddown were a strong Gaelic football team, attracting players from the Windgap and Mooncoin area while Piltown continued the Rangers theme with the introduction of a club called Valley Rangers. Later this was followed by a club called St. Columba's. All these clubs had varying lifespans depending on player recruitment and retention.

=== 1950s ===
The "parish rule" was introduced into Kilkenny in 1952. Intended to encourage community involvement and stop the spread of "super clubs", it required players to play with clubs in their own parish. Following this, the modern club now known simply as Piltown GAA came into existence in 1953. The original grounds, consisting of about 5 acres, had been purchased from the Land Commission on 1 November 1945.

Early meetings of the club took place at St. Columba's Hall which was located at the old graveyard in Piltown. After the hall was demolished, meetings took place at Anthony's Inn, Piltown National School and eventually in the dressing room that used to exist at the road end of the front pitch.

=== 1960s ===
In 1961, the club started raising funds through the annual fete (carnivals), commencing on Easter Sunday. It featured live music in a marquee, amusements and tournament hurling matches with clubs from all over the south east. Work started on developing the grounds in the early 1960s. In 1961, the wall at the road end was erected along with the original dressing rooms, complete with showers and toilets. In 1962/63, the pitch was levelled, resodded and drained. In 1964, a 10-foot wire and post fence was erected around the main pitch. In 1965, the toolshed and the original scoreboard was erected at the road end and it took about £9000 to transform the pitch. The main playing pitch was officially opened on 12 August 1965 when the Kilkenny Senior Hurling team played a challenge match against Waterford.

=== 1970s-1980s ===
In 1972, an additional 12 acres of adjacent lands were purchased. In 1977, it was decided build a new complex on the site with an estimated cost of £40,000. With the popularity of carnivals beginning to wane, a new source of income had to be found.

In 1982, a new income source emerged. The club ran a 600 club draw which, a year later, turned into what is now known as the "Hurlers Co-op draw". (In 1991, the Kilkenny County Board became involved.) Since the 1980s, Piltown GAA has had two full size playing pitches and a juvenile pitch, a handball court, two squash courts and a gym, with bar and social facilities in the GAA complex that was constructed in 1985. The GAA complex was officially opened by the former president of the GAA, Paddy Buggy, on 15 August 1986.

=== 1990s-2000s ===
A third pitch was opened in the 1990s and became an "all-weather pitch" before having match standard floodlights added. The floodlighting was switched on for the first time on Friday 18 November 2005. The first championship game played under lights in Kilkenny took place in Piltown. It was a Senior Football championship clash between Piltown and Railyard in February 2006 with the result being a win for the visitors. A warm-up area was then created at the lower end of the all-weather pitch. In 2010, a shed from the old sugar factory in Carlow was re-erected as a stand on the back pitch.

In 2012, work started on a precast hurling wall and the redevelopment of the former pitch-and-putt course into a fourth playing field. The hurling wall precast structure was erected on 30 March 2012. Lighting was added in 2013. Also in 2013, some benches were added around the pitch and work started on removing the old wire fence around the front pitch and replacing it with a more modern lower fence. In 2019, an fully enclosed Astroturf pitch was appended to the hurling wall.

=== 2020 onwards ===
2022, (post Covid) saw the closure of the GAA complex bar facilities due financial losses. However, the complex bar area continued to provide meeting facilities and a venue for dance classes. In 2024, work commenced on extending the main front pitch and provided a lit walk way for the community.

In December 2024, Piltown GAA designated itself as a "One Club Model" incorporating hurling, Gaelic football, Ladies Gaelic football, camogie. This followed ratification of the "Piltown GAA One Club Charter" which is planned to guide the governance of the unified club by the GAA Club and Piltown Camogie Club (26 November 2024) and Piltown Ladies Gaelic Football Club (29 November 2024). Operating of the "One Club" model was due to commence during 2025.

== Honours ==
=== Hurling ===
- Leinster Junior Club Hurling Championship (1): 2003
- Leinster Special Junior Club Championship (1): 2009
- Kilkenny Junior Hurling Championship (3): 1981, 1996, 2003
- Kilkenny Junior Club League (2): 2012, 2021
- Kilkenny Junior All-County League (1): 2021
- Kilkenny Under-21 Championship (2): 2007, 2011
- Kilkenny Minor Championship (1): 1977
- Kilkenny Minor League (2): 1998, 2004

=== Gaelic football ===
- Kilkenny Intermediate Football Championship (2): 1997, 2001
- Kilkenny Intermediate League (2): 2010, 2018
- Kilkenny Junior Championship (1): 1993
- Kilkenny Under-21 Championship (1): 2006
- Kilkenny Minor Football Championship (3): 1986, 1993, 2020

=== Camogie ===
- Kilkenny Senior Camogie Championship (1): 2024
- Kilkenny Senior Camogie League (4): 2019, 2024, 2025, 2026
- Leinster Senior League (1): 2024
- All-Ireland Intermediate Championship (1): 2014-15
- Leinster Intermediate Championship (1): 2014
- Kilkenny Intermediate Championship (1): 2014
- Kilkenny Junior Championship (1): 2008
- Kilkenny Under-21 Championship (3): 2012, 2016, 2019
- Kilkenny Minor Championship (4): 2006, 2011, 2012, 2021
