= Graignamanagh GAA =

Gaelic sports club in County Killkenny, Ireland

Graignamanagh
- Gráig na Manach
- Founded: 1953
- County: Kilkenny
- Nickname: Graig
- Colours: Green and white
- Grounds: Dr. Tierney Park

Playing kits
Standard colours

Senior Club Championships
| | All Ireland | Leinster champions | Kilkenny champions |
|---|---|---|---|
| Football: | 0 | 0 | 1 |
| Hurling: | 0 | 0 | 0 |

Graignamanagh GAA is a Gaelic Athletic Association club in the village of Graiguenamanagh, County Kilkenny, Ireland. The club fields teams in hurling and Gaelic football.

== History ==
Graignamanagh GAA club was founded under the name St. Vincent's in 1953. Prior to this the Graiguenamanagh area had been served by three clubs: Brandon Rovers, Blacks and Whites and Tinnahinch. The St. Vincent's name was dropped in favour of Graignamanagh in 1967.

== Honours ==
- Kilkenny Senior Football Championship: 1956
- Kilkenny Intermediate Hurling Championship: 1976, 1980, 1985
- Kilkenny Junior Hurling Championship: 1972
