= St Patrick's GAA (Kilkenny) =

Gaelic games club in County Kilkenny, Ireland

St Patrick's
- Cumann Naomh Pádraig
- Founded: 1954
- County: Kilkenny
- Colours: Maroon and white
- Grounds: Ballyraggett

Playing kits
Standard colours

Senior Club Championships
	All Ireland	Leinster champions	Kilkenny champions
Football:	0	0	0
Hurling:	0	0	0

St Patrick's GAA is a Gaelic Athletic Association club located in Ballyragget, County Kilkenny, Ireland. Founded in 1954, the club fields teams in both hurling and Gaelic football.

== Honours ==
- All-Ireland Junior Club Hurling Championship (1): 2012
- Leinster Junior Club Hurling Championship (1): 2011
- Kilkenny Junior Hurling Championship (2): 1978, 2011
- All-Ireland Intermediate Club Hurling Championship (0): (runner-up in 2018)
- Leinster Intermediate Club Hurling Championship (1): 2017
- Kilkenny Intermediate Hurling Championship (2): 1979, 2017

== Notable hurlers ==
- Kevin Kelly
- Matt Ruth
