= Windgap GAA =

Gaelic games club in County Kilkenny, Ireland

Windgap
- Bearna na Gaoithe
- Founded: 1954
- County: Kilkenny
- Nickname: Windgap "Warriors"
- Colours: Red; White
- Grounds: Windgap

Playing kits
Standard colours

Senior Club Championships
	All Ireland	Leinster champions	Kilkenny champions
Hurling:	0	0	0

Windgap GAA is a Gaelic Athletic Association club located in Windgap, County Kilkenny, Ireland. The club was founded in 1954 and is almost exclusively concerned with the game of hurling.

Windgap are a junior club, located in South Kilkenny on the Tipperary border. Senior County hurlers from the club have included Kieran Purcell and Paddy Walsh. Due to low numbers the underage team amalgamated with Galmoy in 2006 and won the "B" league the same year, and they are still joined together in underage levels. Windgap also have a successful senior camogie team. Senior County camogie players from the club include Denise Gaule, Catherine Foley and Michaela Kenneally. The under-16 camogie team won the B County final in 2016.

== Honours ==
- Kilkenny Junior Hurling Championships: (2) 1970, 1986

== Notable players ==
- Denise Gaule
- Kieran Purcell
