= John Locke's GAA =

Gaelic games club in County Kilkenny, Ireland

John Locke's
- Cumann Seán Locha
- Founded: 1889
- County: Kilkenny
- Colours: Saffron and Blue
- Grounds: John Locke's Park
- Coordinates: 52°32′25″N 7°23′13″W

Playing kits
Standard colours

John Locke's GAA is a Gaelic Athletic Association club located in Callan, County Kilkenny, Ireland. The club was founded in 1889 and almost exclusively fields teams in hurling.

== History ==
The club was founded in 1889 and is named after poet and Fenian activist John Locke. He was born in Callan in 1847 and was exiled in the United States.

== Honours ==
- Kilkenny Senior Hurling Championship (1): 1957
- Leinster Junior Club Hurling Championship (1): 2010
- Kilkenny Intermediate Hurling Championship (3): 1935, 1993, 1999
- Kilkenny Junior Hurling Championship (5): 1911, 1952, 1987, 2010, 2017
- Kilkenny Under-21 Hurling 'B' Championship (1) 2010
- Kilkenny Minor Hurling Championship (3): 1950, 1984, 2024
- Kilkenny Minor Hurling 'B' Championship (2) 1997, 2015
- Kilkenny Minor Hurling 'A' League (1) 1984, 2010
- Kilkenny Minor Hurling 'B' League (7) 1989, 1994, 1995, 1996, 2008, 2013, 2015

== Notable hurlers ==
- Paddy Moore
- John Power
