= Maurice Mason (hurler) =

Irish hurler

Maurice Mason (born 1948) is an Irish retired hurler who played for Kilkenny Championship club Ballyhale Shamrocks. He played for the Kilkenny senior hurling team for a brief period, during which time he usually lined out as a centre-back.

== Honours ==
Ballyhale Shamrocks

- All-Ireland Senior Club Hurling Championship (2): 1981, 1984
- Leinster Senior Club Hurling Championship (3): 1978, 1980, 1983
- Kilkenny Senior Hurling Championship (6): 1978, 1979, 1980, 1982, 1983, 1985
- Kilkenny Intermediate Hurling Championship (1): 1974
- Kilkenny Junior Hurling Championship (1): 1973

Kilkenny

- All-Ireland Senior Hurling Championship (1): 1979
- Leinster Senior Hurling Championship (1): 1979

Sporting positions
Preceded by Richie Reid	Kilkenny Senior Hurling Captain; 1981	Succeeded by Brian Cody
