= 2006 Kilkenny Senior Hurling Championship =

Annual hurling competition season

- Dates: 24 September 2006 – 5 November 2006
- Teams: 12
- Sponsor: St. Canice's Credit Union
- Champions: Ballyhale Shamrocks (10th title); Tom Coogan (captain); Maurice Aylward (manager)
- Runners-up: O'Loughlin Gaels; Andy Comerford (captain)
- Relegated: Erin's Own

Tournament statistics
- Matches played: 14
- Goals scored: 20 (1.43 per match)
- Points scored: 359 (25.64 per match)
- Top scorer(s): Conor Herity (1-25)

The 2006 Kilkenny Senior Hurling Championship was the 112th staging of the Kilkenny Senior Hurling Championship since its establishment by the Kilkenny County Board. The championship began on 24 September 2006 and ended on 5 November 2006.

James Stephens were the defending champions, however, they were defeated by O'Loughlin Gaels at the semi-final stage.

On 5 November 2006, Ballyhale Shamrcks won the title after a 1–22 to 2–11 defeat of O'Loughlin Gaels in the final at Nowlan Park. It was their 10th championship title overall and their first title since 1991.

== Team changes ==
=== To Championship ===
Promoted from the Kilkenny Intermediate Hurling Championship

- Dicksboro

=== From Championship ===
Relegated to the Kilkenny Intermediate Hurling Championship

- Glenmore

== Results ==
=== First round ===
24 September 2006 First round	O'Loughlin Gaels	1-17 - 0-09	Young Irelands	Nowlan Park, Kilkenny
	M Bolan 0-7, M Bergin 1-3, M Comerford 0-4, A Geoghegan 0-1, S Cummins 0-1, J Lawlor 0-1.		O Carter 0-2, J Fitzgerald 0-2, T Drennan 0-2, S Byrne 0-1, C Phelan 0-1, DJ Carey 0-1.

24 September 2006 First round	Tullaroan	1-20 - 0-12	St. Martin's	Nowlan Park, Kilkenny
	P Doheny 1-3, J Coogan 0-6, Mark Walsh 0-4, Michael Walsh 0-3, T Fitzgerald 0-2, T Walsh 0-1, Martin Walsh 0-1.		J Mulhall 0-5, John Maher 0-3, E McGrath 0-1, P Maher 0-1, S Coonan 0-1, L Dowling 0-1.	Referee: J Direen (O'Loughlin Gaels)

24 September 2006 First round	Dicksboro	0-09 - 0-09	Dunnamaggin	John Locke Park, Callan
	E O'Donoghue 0-5, C O'Loughlin 0-3, C Starr 0-1.		C Herity 0-4, K Moore 0-2, N Lahart 0-1, S O'Neill 0-1, L Heffernan 0-1.	Referee: P Dunphy (Carrigeen)

1 October 2006 First round	Carrickshock	3-11 - 1-09	Erin's Own	Nowlan Park, Kilkenny
	R Power 1-3, M Rohan 1-2, D Frabks 0-5, J Power 1-0, M Rice 0-1.		D Buggy 1-6, D Byrne 0-1, E Brennan 0-1, D Wallace 0-1.	Referee: J Direen (O'Loughlin Gaels)

1 October 2006 First round replay	Dicksboro	0-07 - 2-10	Dunnamaggin	John Locke Park, Callan
	E O'Donoghue 0-4, D Tyrrell 0-1, C Starr 0-1, D O'Gorman 0-1.		C Herity 1-5, A O'Neill 1-1, S O'Neill 0-3, L Heffernan 0-1.	Referee: E Mansfield (Cloneen)

=== Relegation play-off ===
14 October 2006 Final	Erin's Own	1-11 - 1-11	St. Martin's	Páirc Lachtáin, Freshford
	D Buggy 1-6, G Byrne 0-2, D Meally 0-1, E Brennan 0-1, M Murphy 0-1.		John Maher 1-5, E McGrath 0-3, J Mulhall 0-2, P Maher 0-1.

21 October 2006 Final replay	Erin's Own	1-05 - 0-10	St. Martin's	Páirc Lachtáin, Freshford
	D Buggy 1-1, D Wallace 0-2, R Ryan 0-1, M Murphy 0-1.		John Maher 0-7, P Maher 0-1, J Mulhall 0-1, A Lawlor 0-1.

=== Quarter-finals ===
7 October 2006 Quarter-final	Ballyhale Shamrocks	1-18 - 2-14	Carrickshock	Thomastown Sportsfield, Thomastown
	H Shefflin 0-7, M Aylward 1-2, TJ Reid 0-2, J Fitzpatrick 0-2, P Reid 0-2, M Fennelly 0-1, E Fitzpatrick 0-1, D Hoyne 0-1.		D Franks 0-7, J Power 1-3, S Power 1-0, P Barron 0-2, P Tennyson 0-1, M Rice 0-1.	Referee: D O'Sullivan (John Locke's)

7 October 2006 Quarter-final	O'Loughlin Gaels	1-14 - 0-14	Graigue-Ballycallan	John Locke Park, Callan
	M Nolan 0-6, M Bergin 1-1, M Comerford 0-3, J Comerford 0-1, M Kelly 0-1, A Geoghegan 0-1, B Kelly 0-1.		K Cleere 0-5, M Hoyne 0-3, JJ Brennan 0-2, N Millea 0-2, E Brennan 0-1, J Cleere 0-1.	Referee: E Crowley (Mooncoin)

8 October 2006 Quarter-final	James Stephens	2-10 - 0-08	Tullaroan	John Locke Park, Callan
	E Larkin 0-7, R Hayes 1-0, M Ruth 1-0, D McCormack 0-1, B McEvoy 0-1, N Tyrrell 0-1.		J Coogan 0-4, Mark Walsh 0-3, C Maher 0-1.	Referee: D Connolly (Mooncoin)

8 October 2006 Quarter-final	Dunnamaggin	0-12 - 1-09	Fenians	Nowlan Park, Kilkenny
	C Herity 0-4, S O'Neill 0-2, L Heffernan 0-2, N Lahart 0-2, N Hickey 0-1, A O'Neill 0-1.		K Power 1-0, PJ Delaney 0-3, S Grehan 0-2, PJ Ryan 0-1, J Broderick 0-1, P Quinlan 0-1, B Ryan 0-1.	Referee: P Neary (James Stephens)

15 October 2006 Quarter-final replay	Dunnamaggin	0-11 - 0-06	Fenians	Nowlan Park, Kilkenny
	C Herity 0-6, S O'Neill 0-2, A O'Neill 0-2, L Heffernan 0-1.		B Ryan 0-2, B Power 0-1, J Whelan 0-1, K Power 0-1, PJ Delaney 0-1.

=== Semi-finals ===
22 October 2006 Semi-final	Ballyhale Shamrocks	1-18 - 1-14	Dunnamaggin	Nowlan Park, Kilkenny
	H Shefflin 0-7, P Reid 1-3, J Fitzpatrick 0-3, E Reid 0-2, K Nolan 0-1, E Fitzpatrick 0-1, TJ Reid 0-1.		C Herity 0-6, N Lahart 1-2, N Hickey 0-1, A Hickey 0-1, K Moore 0-1, B O'Shea 0-1, A O'Neill 0-1, L Heffernan 0-1.	Referee: D O'Sullivan (John Locke's)

22 October 2006 Semi-final	O'Loughlin Gaels	0-15 - 0-13	James Stephens	Nowlan Park, Kilkenny
	M Nolan 0-9, M Comerford 0-3, A Geoghegan 0-2, B Dowling 0-1.		E Larkin 0-8, B McEvoy 0-1, G Whelan 0-1, D McCormack 0-1, M Ruth 0-1, S Egan 0-1.	Referee: D Connolly (Mooncoin)

=== Final ===
5 November 2006 Final	Ballyhale Shamrocks	1-21 - 2-11	O'Loughlin Gaels	Nowlan Park, Kilkenny
	H Shefflin 0-10 (0-6 frees); M Aylward 1-2; TJ Reid 0-3; J Fitzpatrick 0-3; P Reid 0-2; M Fennelly, A Cummins, 0-1 each.		M Comerford 2-0; N Nolan 0-5 (0-3 frees); M Bergin 0-2; N Skehan 0-2 (frees); A Geoghegan, B Dowling, 0-1 each.	Referee: D O'Sullivan (John Locke's)

== Championship statistics ==
=== Top scorers ===
Top scorers overall

Rank	Player	Club	Tally	Total	Matches	Average
1	Conor Herity	Dunnamaggin	1-25	28	5	5.60
2	Maurice Nolan	O'Loughlin Gaels	0-27	27	4	6.75
3	Henry Shefflin	Ballyhale Shamrocks	0-24	24	3	8.00
4	David Buggy	Erin's Own	2-16	22	3	7.33
5	John Maher	St. Martin's	1-15	18	3	6.00
6	Martin Comerford	O'Loughlin Gaels	2-10	16	4	4.00
7	Eoin Larkin	James Stephens	0-15	15	2	7.50
8	Mark Bergin	O'Loughlin Gaels	2-06	12	4	3.00
9	Mark Aylward	Ballyhale Shamrocks	2-04	10	3	3.33
9	Patrick Reid	Ballyhale Shamrocks	2-04	10	3	3.33
9	Jimmy Coogan	Tullaroan	0-10	10	2	5.00

Top scorers in a single game

Rank	Player	Club	Tally	Total	Opposition
1	Henry Shefflin	Ballyhale Shamrocks	0-10	10	O'Loughlin Gaels
2	David Buggy	Erin's Own	1-06	9	Carrickshock
2	David Buggy	Erin's Own	1-06	9	St. Martin's
2	Maurice Nolan	O'Loughlin Gaels	0-09	9	James Stephens
3	Conor Herity	Dunnamaggin	1-05	8	Dicksboro
3	John Maher	St. Martin's	1-05	8	Erin's Own
3	Eoin Larkin	James Stephens	0-08	8	O'Loughlin Gaels
4	Maurice Nolan	O'Loughlin Gaels	0-07	7	Young Irelands
4	John Maher	St. Martin's	0-07	7	Erin's Own
4	Henry Shefflin	Ballyhale Shamrocks	0-07	7	Carrickshock
4	David Franks	Carrickshock	0-07	7	Ballyhale Shamrocks
4	Eoin Larkin	James Stephens	0-07	7	Tullaroan
4	Henry Shefflin	Ballyhale Shamrocks	0-07	7	Dunnamaggin
