= 2021 Kilkenny Senior Hurling League =

- Dates: 4 September – 3 October 2021
- Teams: 12
- Sponsor: St. Canice's Credit Union
- Champions: Bennettsbridge (1st title)
- Runners-up: Clara

Tournament statistics
- Matches played: 20
- Goals scored: 51 (2.55 per match)
- Points scored: 718 (35.9 per match)

The 2021 Kilkenny Senior Hurling League was the 28th staging of the Kilkenny Senior Hurling League since its establishment by the Kilkenny County Board in 1992. The league began on 4 September 2021 and ended on 3 October 2021.

Dicksboro were the defending champions, however, they failed to make it out of the group stage.

On 3 October 2021, Bennettsbridge won the league after beating Clara by 0–19 to 0–16 at UPMC Nowlan Park. It was their first ever league title.

== Results ==
=== Group stage ===
==== Group A table ====
Advance to final Advance to shield final

Team	Matches				Score			Pts
Team	Pld	W	D	L	For	Against	Diff	Pts
Clara	3	2	1	0	3-69	2-52	20	5
Mullinavat	3	2	0	1	4-56	5-55	-2	4
O'Loughlin Gaels	3	2	0	1	5-48	2-51	6	4
Dicksboro	3	1	1	1	3-58	5-51	1	3
Graigue-Ballycallan	3	0	1	2	3-49	3-61	-12	1
Erin's Own	3	0	1	2	5-50	6-60	-13	1

==== Group A results ====
4 September 2021 Round 1	Erin's Own	1-19 - 2-23	Dicksboro	Páirc Lachtáin
	J Buggy 0-6, M Boran 1-2, S Feehan 0-3, J Dowd 0-3, D Dunne 0-2, J Brennan 0-2, R Moran 0-1.		S Stapleton 0-8, M Nolan 1-3, A Nolan 1-3, C Buckley 0-2, L Moore 0-2, K Kenny 0-1, E Carroll 0-1, J Sheehan 0-1, O Gough 0-1, B Sheehan 0-1.

4 September 2021 Round 1	O'Loughlin Gaels	1-18 - 0-18	Graigue-Ballycallan	John Locke Park

4 September 2021 Round 1	Clara	1-26 - 1-15	Mullinavat	UPMC Nowlan Park

11 September 2021 Round 2	Graigue-Ballycallan	2-15 - 2-15	Erin's Own	UPMC Nowlan Park

11 September 2021 Round 2	Dicksboro	0-21 - 2-15	Clara	Young Irelands GAA Grounds

11 September 2021 Round 2	Mullinavat	1-19 - 2-13	O'Loughlin Gaels	John Locke Park

19 September 2021 Round 3	Clara	0-28 - 1-16	Graigue-Ballycallan	Danesfort GAA Grounds

19 September 2021 Round 3	O'Loughlin Gaels	2-17 - 1-14	Dicksboro	UPMC Nowlan Park

25 September 2021 Round 3	Erin's Own	2-16 - 2-22	Mullinavat	Thomastown GAA Grounds

==== Group B table ====
Advance to final Advance to shield final

Team	Matches				Score			Pts
Team	Pld	W	D	L	For	Against	Diff	Pts
Bennettsbridge	3	3	0	0	5-67	9-45	10	6
James Stephens	3	2	1	0	1-56	1-45	11	5
Tullaroan	3	1	1	1	6-40	3-64	-15	3
Ballyhale Shamrocks	3	1	0	2	9-59	5-59	12	2
Lisdowney	3	0	2	1	4-43	4-46	-3	2
Rower-Inistioge	3	0	0	3	0-52	3-58	-15	0

==== Group B results ====
4 September 2021 Round 1	James Stephens	1-20 - 0-15	Rower-Inistioge	Thomastown GAA Grounds

5 September 2021 Round 1	Bennettsbridge	3-23 - 6-11	Ballyhale Shamrocks	UPMC Nowlan Park

5 September 2021 Round 1	Tullaroan	2-13 - 1-16	Lisdowney	UPMC Nowlan Park

11 September 2021 Round 2	Rower-Inistioge	0-18 - 2-15	Tullaroan	Thomastown GAA Grounds

11 September 2021 Round 2	Lisdowney	3-15 - 2-21	Bennettsbridge	Danesfort GAA Grounds

11 September 2021 Round 2	Ballyhale Shamrocks	1-18 - 0-24	James Stephens	UPMC Nowlan Park

19 September 2021 Round 3	James Stephens	0-12 - 0-12	Lisdowney	Páirc Lachtáin

19 September 2021 Round 3	Tullaroan	2-12 - 2-30	Ballyhale Shamrocks	John Locke Park

25 September 2021 Round 3	Bennettsbridge	0-23 - 0-19	Rower-Inistioge	Young Irelands GAA Grounds

=== Knockout stage ===
==== Shield final ====
2 October 2021 Final	James Stephens	2-21 - 1-15	Mullinavat	Bennettsbridge GAA Grounds

==== Final ====
3 October 2021 Final	Bennettsbridge	0-19 - 0-16	Clara	UPMC Nowlan Park
	N Cleere 0-8 (8f); W Murphy 0-5; L Blanchfield 0-4; J Cleere, J Harkin 0-1 each.		Liam Ryan 0-4; C O’Shea (2f); C Bolger 0-3 each; M Kenny 0-2 (1f); J Langton, M O’Connell, D Langton, P Cody 0-1 each.	Referee: J Dooley
