= 2019 Kilkenny Senior Hurling League =

- Dates: 6 April 2019 – 22 September 2019
- Teams: 12
- Sponsor: St. Canice's Credit Union
- Champions: Dicksboro (4th title)
- Runners-up: O'Loughlin Gaels

Tournament statistics
- Matches played: 32
- Top scorer(s): Mark Bergin (2-45)

The 2019 Kilkenny Senior Hurling League was the 26th staging of the Kilkenny Senior Hurling League since its establishment by the Kilkenny County Board in 1992. The league began on 6 April 2019 and ended on 22 September 2019.

James Stephens were the defending champions.

On 22 September 2019, Dicksboro won the league after a 2-15 to 2-14 defeat of O'Loughlin Gaels in the final. This was their fourth league title overall and their first tile since 2-17.

== Results ==
=== Group A ===
==== Table ====
Team	Matches				Score			Pts
Team	Pld	W	D	L	For	Against	Diff	Pts
Dicksboro	5	4	0	1	112	76	36	8
Rower-Inistioge	5	3	0	2	91	88	3	6
Danesfort	5	3	0	2	100	97	3	6
Graigue-Ballycallan	5	2	0	3	93	97	-4	4
Erin's Own	5	2	0	3	88	88	0	4
St. Patricks' Ballyragget	5	1	0	4	77	115	38	2

==== Results ====
6 April 2019 Round 1	St. Patricks' Ballyragget	1-19 - 3-12	Rower-Inistioge	St. John's Park, Kilkenny
	K Kelly 0-8, M Brennan 1-3, J Brennan 0-3, J Morrissey 0-2, O Brennan 0-1, R Healy 0-1, S Kenny 0-1.		D Kelly 0-9, P Lyng 1-0, C Joyce 1-0, R Leahy 1-0, C Ryan 0-1, K Murphy 0-1, J Ryan 0-1.	Referee: S Cleere (O'Loughlin Gaels)

7 April 2019 Round 1	Dicksboro	1-16 - 2-11	Graigue-Ballycallan	St. Patrick's Park, Ballyragget
	S Stapleton 0-8, E O'Donoghue 1-0, O Walsh 0-3, C Kavanagh 0-2, S Farrell 0-1, E Moylan 0-1, A Gaffney 0-1.		B Ryan 1-2, A Brennan 1-0, S Ryan 0-3, C Murphy 0-3, C Hoyne 0-2, S O'Dwyer 0-1.	Referee: E Mansfield (Cloneen)

7 April 2019 Round 1	Danesfort	0-17 - 3-14	Erin's Own	Clara
	P Hogan 0-10, J Mullally 0-2, P Murphy 0-1, R Hogan 0-1, O Hickey 0-1, R Walsh 0-1, D O'Neill 0-1.		M Murphy 0-7, M Boran 1-1, J Brennan 1-0, J Holohan 1-0, C Fogarty 0-2, E Brennan 0-2, S Feehan 0-2.	Referee: P Burke (Emeralds)

19 April 2019 Round 2	Erin's Own	1-13 - 1-14	Dicksboro	Clara
	M Murphy 1-8, M Boran 0-2, E Brennan 0-1, S Feehan 0-1, D Dunne 0-1.		A Gaffney 1-4, K Kenny 0-4, M Gaffney 0-2, M Nolan 0-1, B Sheehan 0-1, A Nolan 0-1, C Kavanagh 0-1.	Referee: G Quilty (Slieverue)

20 April 2019 Round 2	Graigue-Ballycallan	5-14 - 0-16	St. Patricks' Ballyragget	Palmerstown
	S Ryan 3-3, C Murphy 1-3, A Brennan 1-1, B Ryan 0-2, J Roberts 0-2, S O'Dwyer 0-2, S Butler 0-1.		M Brennan 0-7, K Kelly 0-5, O Brennan 0-1, R Healy 0-1, B Staunton 0-1, J Morrissey 0-1.	Referee: J O'Dwyer (John Lockes)

21 April 2019 Round 2	Rower-Inistioge	0-18 - 0-14	Danesfort	Thomastown
	D Kelly 0-7, C Ryan 0-3, R Leahy 0-2, K Murphy 0-2, P Lyng 0-2, S Lester 0-1, C Joyce 0-1.		P Hogan 0-6, P Mullen 0-3, P Hickey 0-2, C Phelan 0-2, R Walsh 0-1.

21 May 2019 Round 3	Dicksboro	2-16 - 2-17	Danesfort	John Locke Park, Callan
	S Stapleton 0-6, K Kenny 1-2, A Gaffney 1-0, B Sheehan 0-3, C Kavanagh 0-1, T Kenny 0-1, O Walsh 0-1, M Gaffney 0-1, C Doheny 0-1.		P Hogan 0-9, C Treacy 2-1, R Hogan 0-3, R Walsh 0-3, P Hickey 0-1.	Referee: M Flynn (Mooncoin)

21 May 2019 Round 3	Erin's Own	1-15 - 2-09	St. Patricks' Ballyragget	Páirc Lachtain, Freshford
	M Murphy 0-11, J Mullins 1-0, S Feehan 0-1, M Boran 0-1, N McMahon 0-1, J Holohan 0-1.		K Kelly 0-6, J Morrissey 1-1, J Brennan 1-0, M Brennan 0-1, J Gannon 0-1.	Referee: G Quilty (Slieverue)

22 May 2019 Round 3	Graigue-Ballycallan	0-10 - 1-16	Rower-Inistioge	Dunnamaggin
	C Murphy 0-7, E Egan 0-1, B Ryan 0-1, A Brennan 0-1.		D Kelly 0-8, C Joyce 1-2, C Ryan 0-4, R Leahy 0-1, K Murphy 0-1.	Referee: S Cleere (O'Loughlin Gaels)

31 August 2019 Round 4	St. Patricks' Ballyragget	0-08 - 3-17	Dicksboro	Canon Kearns Park, Castlecomer
	K Kelly 0-6, R Healy 0-1, M Brennan 0-1.		A Nolan 2-3, S Stapleton 0-9, O Gough 1-0, M Nolan 0-2, C Buckley 0-1, O Walsh 0-1, C Kavanagh 0-1.	Referee: O Kenny (Tullogher-Rosbercon)

31 August 2019 Round 4	Rower-Inistioge	1-17 - 1-12	Erin's Own	St. John's Park, Kilkenny
	D Kelly 0-7, J Ryan 1-1, R Lehay 0-2, M Galavan 0-2, E Doyle 0-2, T Murphy 0-1, S Lester 0-1, P Lyng 0-1.		M Murphy 1-8, D Dunne 0-2, C Fogarty 0-1, S Feehan 0-1.	Referee: S Cleere (O'Loughlin Gaels)

31 August 2019 Round 4	Danesfort	0-26 - 0-18	Graigue-Ballycallan	John Locke Park, Callan
	P Hogan 0-12, P Hickey 0-4, J Bruton 0-3, R Hogan 0-3, G Tynan 0-2, P Mullen 0-1, R Walsh 0-1.		C Murphy 0-8, J Roberts 0-4, B Ryan 0-2, C Hoyne 0-2, S Ryan 0-1, E Egan 0-1.	Referee: R Byrne (Glenmore)

7 September 2019 Round 5	Erin's Own	1-13 - 1-16	Graigue-Ballycallan	St. Lachtain's Park, Freshford
	M Murphy 0-4, P Boran 1-0, J Mullins 0-2, D Dunne 0-2, E Brennan 0-2, S Feehan 0-1, M Boran 0-1.		S Ryan 0-6, B Ryan 1-2, C Murphy 0-4, C Hoyne 0-1, E Egan 0-1, R Keoghan 0-1, T Ronan 0-1.	Referee: P Burke (Emeralds)

7 September 2019 Round 5	Dicksboro	1-24 - 0-12	Rower-Inistioge	Gowran
	S Stapleton 0-8, A Nolan 1-2, M Nolan 0-4, E Gough 0-3, R Murphy 0-2, M Gaffney 0-2, O Walsh 0-1, R Fitzpatrick 0-1, C Buckley 0-1.		D Kelly 0-10, P Lyng 0-1, C Ryan 0-1.

7 September 2019 Round 5	Danesfort	1-17 - 0-16	St. Patricks' Ballyragget	Jenkinstown
	P Hogan 0-7, R Hogan 1-3, P Hickey 0-3, R Walsh 0-2, C Phelan 0-1, J Bruton 0-1.		K Kelly 0-10, G Brennan 0-2, J Phelan 0-2, J Brennan 0-1, B Phelan 0-1.	Referee: P Cahill (Dunnamaggin)

=== Group B ===
==== Table ====
Team	Matches				Score			Pts
Team	Pld	W	D	L	For	Against	Diff	Pts
O'Loughlin Gaels	5	3	1	1	120	100	20	7
Clara	5	3	0	2	107	108	-1	6
Mullinavat	5	2	1	2	102	107	-5	5
James Stephens	5	2	1	2	94	97	-3	5
Ballyhale Shamrocks	5	2	0	3	94	104	-10	4
Bennettsbridge	5	1	1	3	127	126	1	3

==== Results ====
6 April 2019 Round 1	Bennettsbridge	2-20 - 2-18	James Stephens	Danesfort
	N Cleere 0-8, S Morrissey 1-3, L Blanchfield 1-2, C Brennan 0-4, K Blanchfield 0-1, J Cleere 0-1, D Blanchfield 0-1.		E Guilfoyle 0-10, N Brassil 1-4, T O'Dwyer 1-1, E Larkin 0-2, M Ruth 0-1.	Referee: R Byrne (Glenmore)

6 April 2019 Round 1	Ballyhale Shamrocks	3-15 - 2-22	Clara	John Locke Park, Callan
	TJ Reid 1-8, C Fennelly 1-2, B Cody 1-1, E Shefflin 0-1, P Mullen 0-1, R Reid 0-1, A Mullen 0-1.		J Bergin 1-9, C Bolger 1-1, L Ryan 0-3, J Murphy 0-2, M Kenny 0-2, D Langton 0-1, J Nolan 0-1, C O'Shea 0-1, L Ryan 0-1, M McDonald 0-1.	Referee: G Quilty (Slieverue)

7 April 2019 Round 1	Mullinavat	2-12 - 2-21	O'Loughlin Gaels	Thomastown
	J Walsh 1-8, J Fennelly 1-1, G Malone 0-2, S Aylward 0-1.		M Bergin 0-8, D Burke 1-3, C Bergin 1-0, S Bolger 0-3, J Nolan 0-2, P Deegan 0-2, C Heary 0-1, E O'Shea 0-1, M Comerford 0-1.	Referee: C Everard (Graigue-Ballycallan)

20 April 2019 Round 2	O'Loughlin Gaels	0-17 - 1-16	Ballyhale Shamrocks	John Locke Park, Callan
	M Bergin 0-12, C Loy 0-2, S Murphy 0-1, C Bergin 0-1, P Deegan 0-1.		TJ Reid 0-8, C Fennelly 1-2, E Cody 0-2, R Corcoran 0-2, R Reid 0-1, M Gorman 0-1.	Referee: O Kenny (Tullogher-Rosbercon)

20 April 2019 Round 2	James Stephens	0-18 - 0-24	Mullinavat	Dunnamaggin
	E Guilfoyle 0-9, L Scanlon 0-4, M Ruth 0-1, J McGrath 0-1, N Mullins 0-1, T O'Dwyer 0-1, N Brassill 0-1.		J Walsh 0-16, M Mansfield 0-4, B Phelan 0-2, A Mansfield 0-1, M Malone 0-1.	Referee: P Cahill (Dunnamaggin)

20 April 2019 Round 2	Clara	3-17 - 3-14	Bennettsbridge	Gowran
	J Bergin 1-12, J Nolan 2-0, C Bolger 0-2, J Murphy 0-1, M O'Connell 0-1, L Ryan 0-1.		L Blanchfield 2-2, N Cleere 0-6, J Cleere 1-0, S Morrissey 0-2, A Cleere 0-2, C Brennan 0-1, K Blanchfield 0-1.	Referee: M Flynn (Mooncoin)

21 May 2019 Round 3	Mullinavat	4-12 - 1-21	Bennetsbridge	Páirc Seamróg, Ballyhale
	J Walsh 1-6, J Gahan 1-2, G Malone 1-1, M Mansfield 0-2, A Mansfield 0-1.		J Harkin 0-8, C Brennan 1-4, K Brennan 0-2, D Blanchfield 0-2, W Murphy 0-2, J Cleere 0-1, S Morrissey 0-1, K Blanchfield 0-1.	Referee: P Burke (Emeralds)

21 May 2019 Round 3	O'Loughlin Gaels	2-19 - 2-12	Clara	Páirc Shéamuis Stíophán, Kilkenny
	M Bergin 1-11, C Loy 1-0, S Mahoney 0-2, M Comerford 0-2, H Lawlor 0-1, P Butler 0-1, S Bolger 0-1, C Bergin 0-1.		J Nolan 1-1, N Creane 1-0, Liam Ryan 0-3, Lester Ryan 0-3, C Bolger 0-2, J Bergin 0-2, P Nolan 0-1.	Referee: C Everard (Graigue-Ballycallan)

22 May 2019 Round 3	James Stephens	1-20 - 1-09	Ballyhale Shamrocks	Hugginstown
	E Guilfoyle 1-9, N Brassill 0-6, D Hennessy 0-1, M Ruth 0-1, T O'Dwyer 0-1, C Kenny 0-1, C Browne 0-1.		TJ Reid 0-6, A Mullen 1-0, R Reid 0-1, P Mullen 0-1, D Corcoran 0-1.	Referee: P Cahill (Dunnamaggin)

31 August 2019 Round 4	Clara	0-14 - 0-18	James Stephens	Bennettsbridge
	C Bolger 0-5, D Langton 0-2, J Bergin 0-2, L Ryan 0-1, C O'Shea 0-1, J Murphy 0-1, J Byrne 0-1, P Nolan 0-1.		E Guilfoyle 0-9, N Brassill 0-3, C Browne 0-2, T O'Dwyer 0-2, L Scanlon 0-2.	Referee: M Flynn (Mooncoin)

31 August 2019 Round 4	Ballyhale Shamrocks	1-14 - 2-12	Mullinavat	Mullinavat
	TJ Reid 0-5, C Fennelly 1-1, E Reid 0-3, E Cody 0-2, R Reid 0-1, M Aylward 0-1, K Fennelly 0-1.		M Mansfield 0-4, B Phelan 1-0, C Duggan 1-0, J Walsh 0-3, P Gahan 0-1, I Duggan 0-1, G Malone 0-1, O Knox 0-1, A Mansfield 0-1.	Referee: P Burke (Emeralds)

1 September 2019 Round 4	Bennettsbridge	0-24 - 3-21	O'Loughlin Gaels	Gowran
	N Cleere 0-13, K Blanchfield 0-3, L Blanchfield 0-2, J Cleere 0-1, K Brennan 0-1, H O'Neill 0-1, C Brennan 0-1, A Cleere 0-1, B Lannon 0-1.		M Bergin 1-7, C Heary 2-2, P Deegan 0-3, S Bolger 0-3, R Buckley 0-2, S Murphy 0-1, J Nolan 0-1, C Bergin 0-1, S Mahoney 0-1.	Referee: P Cahill

7 September 2019 Round 5	James Stephens	1-18 - 1-18	O'Loughlin Gaels	Nowlan Park, Kilkenny
	E Guilfoyle 0-8, C Browne 1-0, N Brassill 0-3, T O'Dwyer 0-2, M Ruth 0-2, L Scanlon 0-1, N Mullins 0-2, E Larkin 0-1.		S Bolger 0-10, R Buckley 1-1, E O'Shea 0-1, D Loughnane 0-1, S Mahony 0-1, H Lawlor 0-1, M Butler 0-1, P Deegan 0-1, C Heary 0-1.	Referee: R Byrne

7 September 2019 Round 5	Mullinavat	1-15 - 1-18	Clara	Thomastown
	M Mansfield 0-7, W Dwyer 1-0, G Malone 0-3, A Mansfield 0-3, J Fennelly 0-1, O Knox 0-1.		J Bergin 0-10, C Bolger 1-1, Liam Ryan 0-3, Lester Ryan 0-1, M Kenny 0-1, C O'Shea 0-1, J Nolan 0-1.

7 September 2019 Round 5	Bennettsbridge	1-17 - 2-16	Ballyhale Shamrocks	John Locke Park, Callan
	N Cleere 0-9, J Cleere 1-0, C Brennan 0-2, B Lannon 0-2, S Morrissey 0-1, E Morrissey 0-1, K Brennan 0-1, K Blanchfield 0-1.		TJ Reid 1-10, E Cody 1-1, E Reid 0-1, A Mullen 0-1, P Mullen 0-1, R Reid 0-1, E Shefflin 0-1.	Referee: G Quilty (Slieverue)

=== Knock-out stage ===
==== Shield final ====
22 September 2019 Shield final	Rower-Inistioge	3-11 - 0-17	Clara	Nowlan Park, Kilkenny
	D Kelly 0-5, T Doyle 1-1, K Murphy 1-1, J Ryan 1-0, P Lyng 0-2, R Leahy 0-2.		J Bergin 0-8, Liam Ryan 0-5, J Murphy 0-1, C O'Shea 0-1, J Byrne 0-1, P Nolan 0-1.	Referee: E Beehan (Fenians)

==== Final ====
22 September 2019 Final	Dickboro	2-15 - 2-14	O'Loughlin Gaels	Nowlan Park, Kilkenny
	B Sheehan 1-5, A Gaffney 1-4, S Stapleton 0-3, O Walsh 0-1, R Fitzpatrick 0-1, R Murphy 0-1.		M Bergin 0-7, M Comerford 1-1, C Loy 1-0, D Loughnane 0-2, R Buckley 0-1, S Bolger 0-1, C Heary 0-1, E O'Shea 0-1.	Referee: J O'Dwyer (Windgap)

== League statistics ==
=== Top scorers ===
Top scorers overall

Rank	Player	Club	Tally	Total	Matches	Average
1	Mark Bergin	O'Loughlin Gaels	2-45	51	5	10.20
2	James Bergin	Clara	2-43	49	6	8.16
3	Eoin Guilfoyle	James Stephens	1-45	48	5	9.60
4	David Kelly	Mullinavat	0-46	46	6	7.66
5	Michael Murphy	Erin's Own	2-38	44	5	8.80
5	Paddy Hogan	Danesfort	0-44	44	5	8.80
6	T. J. Reid	Ballyhale Shamrocks	2-37	43	5	8.60
7	John Walsh	Mullinavat	2-33	39	4	9.75
8	Nicky Cleere	Bennettsbridge	0-36	36	4	9.00
9	Kevin Kelly	St. Patrick's	0-35	35	5	7.00

Top scorers in a single game

Rank	Player	Club	Tally	Total	Opposition
1	John Walsh	Mullinavat	0-16	16	James Stephens
2	James Bergin	Clara	1-12	15	Bennettsbridge
3	Mark Bergin	O'Loughlin Gaels	1-11	14	Bennettsbridge
4	T. J. Reid	Ballyhale Shamrocks	1-10	13	Bennettsbridge
4	Nicky Cleere	Bennettsbridge	0-13	13	O'Loughlin Gaels
5	Seán Ryan	Graigue-Ballycallan	3-03	12	St. Patrick's Ballyragget
5	James Bergin	Clara	1-09	12	Ballyhale Shamrocks
5	Eoin Guilfoyle	James Stephens	1-09	12	Ballyhale Shamrocks
5	Mark Bergin	O'Loughlin Gaels	0-12	12	Ballyhale Shamrocks
5	Paddy Hogan	Danesfort	0-12	12	Graigue-Ballycallan
