= Tom McCormack (James Stephens hurler) =

Irish hurler

Personal information
- Native name: Tomás Mac Cormaic (Irish)
- Born: 11 March 1953 (age 73) Kilkenny, Ireland
- Occupation: Insurance inspector
- Height: 6 ft 0 in (183 cm)

Sport
- Sport: Hurling
- Position: Left wing-back
Club
- Years: Club
- James Stephens
Club titles
- Kilkenny titles: 3
- Leinster titles: 2
- All-Ireland Titles: 2
Inter-county
- Years: County
- 1974-1983: Kilkenny
Inter-county titles
- Leinster titles: 4
- All-Irelands: 4
- NHL: 3
- All Stars: 0

Thomas McCormack (born 11 March 1953) is an Irish former hurler. At club level, he played with James Stephens and at inter-county level with the Kilkenny senior hurling team.

== Career ==
McCormack first played hurling at juvenile and underage levels with the James Stephens club in Kilkenny. He won consecutive Kilkenny MHC titles before later progressing to the club's senior team. McCormack won consecutive Kilkenny SHC titles in 1975 and 1976, before claiming a third winners' medal after a defeat of Fenians in 1981. Two of these victories were subsequently converted into Leinster Club SHC titles. McCormack also claimed two All-Ireland Club SHC medals after wins over Blackrock (1976) and Mount Sion (1982).

At inter-county level, McCormack first played for Kilkenny as a member of the minor team. He was at left wing-back on the team beaten by Cork in the 1971 All-Ireland MHC final. McCormack progressed to the under-21 team and won an All-Ireland U21HC medal in 1974 after a one-point defeat of Waterford in the final.

McCormack made his first appearance for the senior team when he was a late inclusion at wing-back on the team that beat Limerick in the 1974 All-Ireland SHC final. He claimed a second consecutive winners' medal after again lining out at wing-back in the defeat of Galway the following year. McCormack added a National Hurling League medal to his collection in 1976.

After a number of years away from the team, McCormack was recalled, alongside his brother Dinny, after some successes at club level. He ended his career by winning consecutive National League titles as well as consecutive All-Ireland SHC medals during the 1982–83 seasons.

== Honours ==
James Stephens

- All-Ireland Senior Club Hurling Championship: 1976, 1982
- Leinster Senior Club Hurling Championship: 1976, 1982
- Kilkenny Senior Hurling Championship: 1975, 1976, 1981
- Kilkenny Minor Hurling Championship: 1970, 1971

Kilkenny

- All-Ireland Senior Hurling Championship: 1974, 1975, 1982, 1983
- Leinster Senior Hurling Championship: 1974, 1975, 1982, 1983
- National Hurling League: 1975–76, 1981–82, 1982–83
- All-Ireland Under-21 Hurling Championship: 1974
- Leinster Under-21 Hurling Championship: 1974
- All-Ireland Minor Hurling Championship: 1971
- Leinster Minor Hurling Championship: 1971
