= Martin Brennan (hurler) =

Irish Gaelic sportsperson (born 1946)

Personal information
- Native name: Máirtín Ó Braonáin (Irish)
- Nickname: Goggy
- Born: June 1946 (age 80) Castlecomer, County Kilkenny, Ireland
- Height: 5 ft 8 in (173 cm)

Sport
- Sport: Hurling
- Position: Full-forward
Club
- Years: Club
- Erin's Own
Club titles
- Kilkenny titles: 0
Inter-county
Years	County	Apps (scores)
1966-1969	Kilkenny	4 (2-03)
Inter-county titles
- Leinster titles: 2
- All-Irelands: 2
- NHL: 0
- All Stars: 0

Martin Brennan (born 1946) is an Irish hurling coach and former player. At club level, he played with Erin's Own and at inter-county level with the Kilkenny senior hurling team.

== Playing career ==
Born in Castlecomer, County Kilkenny, Brennan first played hurling as a schoolboy at the local national school and won two county juvenile championship medals. He later lined out at club level with Erin's Own.

At inter-county level, Brennan first played for Kilkenny as a corner-forward on the minor team beaten by Laois in the 1964 Leinster MHC final. He progressed to the under-21 team as a goalkeeper, but ended his underage career without silverware.

Brennan first played for the senior team in a tournament game in December 1966. He scored a goal from corner-forward when Kilkenny beat Tipperary in the 1967 All-Ireland SHC final. Brennan won his first Leinster SHC medal on the field of play two years later. He later claimed a second All-Ireland SHC medal after a 2–15 to 2–09 win over Cork. Brennan's hurling career ended when he suffered a severe ankle fracture while playing with Kilkenny in New York.

== Coaching career ==
Brennan became involved in team management and coaching following his retirement from playing. He took charge of a number of club teams, including Danesfort, Fenians, Young Irelands and Conahy Shamrocks. Brennan was also a selector on the Kilkenny under-21 team that won the All-Ireland U21HC title in 1990, with his son, Jamesie Brennan, as team captain.

== Honours ==
=== Player ===
Kilkenny

- All-Ireland Senior Hurling Championship: 1967, 1969
- Leinster Senior Hurling Championship: 1967, 1969

=== Selector ===
Kilkenny

- All-Ireland Under-21 Hurling Championship: 1990
- Leinster Under-21 Hurling Championship: 1990
