= Dinny McCormack =

Irish hurler

Denis McCormack (born 1951) is an Irish retired hurler who played for Kilkenny Senior Championship club James Stephens. He also played for the Kilkenny senior hurling team and was a member of the All-Ireland Championship-winning team in 1982.

== Honours ==
James Stephens

- All-Ireland Senior Club Hurling Championship (2): 1976, 1982
- Leinster Senior Club Hurling Championship (2): 1975, 1981
- Kilkenny Senior Hurling Championship (4): 1975, 1976, 1981

Kilkenny

- All-Ireland Senior Hurling Championship (1): 1982
- Leinster Senior Hurling Championship (1): 1982
- National Hurling League (1): 1981-82
- Leinster Minor Hurling Championship (1): 1969
