= 1984 Kilkenny Senior Hurling Championship =

Annual hurling competition season

- Champions: St. Martin's (1st title); Johnny Brennan (captain)
- Runners-up: Ballyhale Shamrocks

The 1984 Kilkenny Senior Hurling Championship was the 90th staging of the Kilkenny Senior Hurling Championship since its establishment by the Kilkenny County Board in 1887.

Ballyhale Shamrocks were the defending champions.

The final was played on 30 September 1984 at Nowlan Park in Kilkenny, between St Martin's and Ballyhale Shamrocks, in what was their first ever meeting in the final. St Martin's won the match by 1–14 to 1–07 to claim their only championship title.

== Knockout stage ==
=== Semi-finals ===
9 September 1984 Semi-final	Ballyhale Shamrocks	2-09 - 1-07	Glenmore	Nowlan Park
	M Kelly 1-1, B Fennelly 0-4, D Fennelly 0-2, M Mason 0-1, T Phelan 0-1.		R Heffernan 1-3, M O'Connor 0-2, S Boyle 0-1, J Murphy 0-1.

9 September 1984 Semi-final	St Martin's	3-06 - 1-05	James Stephens	Nowlan Park
	R Moloney 2-0, T Moran 1-3, Jim Moran 0-1, John Moran 0-1, P Moran 0-1.		J McCormack 1-2, B Walton 0-1, T Leahy 0-1, M Forristal 0-1.

=== Final ===
30 September 1984 Final	St Martin's	1-14 - 1-07	Ballyhale Shamrocks	Nowlan Park
	J Brennan 0-11, T Moran 1-1, J Morrissey 0-1, P Moran 0-1.		D Fennelly 1-1, B Fennelly 0-3, T Phelan 0-2, G Fennelly 0-1.
