= 1989 Kilkenny Senior Hurling Championship =

Annual hurling competition season

- Dates: 29 April – 21 October 1989
- Champions: Ballyhale Shamrocks (8th title); Watty Phelan (captain)
- Runners-up: Glenmore
- Relegated: Thomastown

The 1989 Kilkenny Senior Hurling Championship was the 95th staging of the Kilkenny Senior Hurling Championship since its establishment by the Kilkenny County Board.

Ballyhale Shamrocks were the defending champions.

Ballyhale Shamrocks won the championship after a 2–11 to 1–13 defeat of Glenmore in the final. It was their eighth championship title overall and their second title in succession.

== Relegation stage ==
=== Relegation final ===
| 9 September 1989 Final | Conahy Shamrocks | 0-12 - 0-09 | Thomastown | Nowlan Park |
| | J Feehan 0-3, C Brennan 0-3, K Brennan 0-3, S Cahill 0-2, C Brennan 0-1. | | B O'Keeffe 0-5, T O'Keeffe 0-3, C Fitzgerald 0-1. |

== Knockout stage ==
=== Semi-finals ===
| 27 August 1989 Semi-final | Ballyhale Shamrocks | 3-14 - 0-10 | Clara | Nowlan Park |
| | J Lawlor 1-5, D Fennelly 1-1, B Mason 1-1, G Fennelly 0-3, T Shefflin 0-2, T Phelan 0-1, L Fennelly 0-1. | | A Prendergast 0-8, P Murphy 0-1, Lester Ryan 0-1. |

| 27 August 1989 Semi-final | Glenmore | 2-11 - 0-11 | James Stephens | Nowlan Park |
| | R Heffernan 0-6, C Heffernan 1-2, J Murphy 1-2, J Flynn 0-1. | | B Walton 0-5, A Ayres 0-2, T Leahy 0-2, E Connery 0-1, L Mullen 0-1. |

=== Final ===
| 1 October 1989 Final | Ballyhale Shamrocks | 2-11 - 1-13 | Glenmore | Nowlan Park |
| | G Fennelly 0-6, B Fennelly 1-1, P Phelan 1-0, D Fennelly 0-2, T Shefflin 0-1, J Lawlor 0-1. | | R Heffernan 0-9, J Heffernan 1-0, C Heffernan 0-2, J Flynn 0-1, J Murphy 0-1. |
