= 1979 Kilkenny Senior Hurling Championship =

Annual hurling competition season

- Champions: Ballyhale Shamrocks (2nd title); Johnny Walsh (captain)
- Runners-up: Erin's Own; Martin Coogan (captain)

The 1979 Kilkenny Senior Hurling Championship was the 85th staging of the Kilkenny Senior Hurling Championship since its establishment by the Kilkenny County Board.

Ballyhale Shamrocks were the defending champions.

On 11 November 1979, Ballyhale Shamrocks won the championship after a 3–12 to 1–06 defeat of Erin's Own in a final replay. It was their second championship title overall and their second title in succession.

== Results ==
=== Semi-finals ===
23 September 1979 Semi-final	Ballyhale Shamrocks	3-11 - 1-08	Fenians	Nowlan Park, Kilkenny

23 September 1979 Semi-final	Erin's Own	0-09 - 0-08	James Stephens	Nowlan Park, Kilkenny

=== Finals ===
7 October 1979 Final	Ballyhale Shamrocks	0-14 - 0-14	Erin's Own	Nowlan Park, Kilkenny
	G Fennelly 0-7, K Fennelly 0-3, B Fennelly 0-1, M Fennelly 0-1, S Fennelly 0-1, L Fennelly 0-1.		M Nash 0-5, M Brennan 0-3, S Brennan 0-2, T Brennan 0-1, E Brennan 0-1, E Wallace 0-1, S Coogan 0-1.	Referee: J Manley (Tullogher)

11 November 1979 Final replay	Ballyhale Shamrocks	3-12 - 1-06	Erin's Own	Nowlan Park, Kilkenny
	M Kelly 1-3, G Fennelly 0-6, B Fennelly 1-1, L Fennelly 1-1, M Fennelly 0-1.		M Nash 1-6.

== Championship statistics ==
=== Miscellaneous ===
- The drawn final was a unique occasion for the Fennelly family who represented the Ballyhale Shamrocks club. Seven brothers - Ger, Kevin, Brendan, Mick, Seán and Liam - scored the entire Ballyhale total of 0–14.
- The final replay ended in chaos when the referee abandoned the game with ten minutes to go when an Erin's Own player refused to leave the field after being sent off.
