= 2018 Kilkenny Senior Hurling League =

- Dates: 14 April - 22 September 2018
- Teams: 12
- Sponsor: St. Canice's Credit Union
- Champions: James Stephens (2nd title)
- Runners-up: O'Loughlin Gaels

The 2018 Kilkenny Senior Hurling League was the 25th staging of the competition since its establishment by the Kilkenny County Board in 1992.

The league competition consisted of 12 teams divided into two groups of six and ran from 14 April to 22 September 2018.

The two second-placed teams in each group qualified to compete in the shield final. In this game Dicksboro defeated Bennettsbridge by 2–24 to 2–17.

The two first-placed teams in each group qualified for the league final in which James Stephens defeated O'Loughlin Gaels by 1–17 to 1–16 at UPMC Nowlan Park on 17 September 2022. It was the club's second league title.

== Results ==
=== Group Stage ===
==== Group A Table ====
Team	P	W	D	L	F	A	+/-	Pts	Qualification	
O'Loughlin Gaels	5	5	0	0	109	77	32	10	league final	championship quarter-final
Bennettsbridge	5	3	0	2	99	95	4	6	shield final	championship quarter-final
Ballyhale Shamrocks	5	3	0	2	106	88	18	6	championship round 1	
Rower–Inistioge	5	2	0	3	98	90	8	4	championship round 1	
Erin's Own	5	1	0	4	67	105	-38	2	championship round 1	
Danesfort	5	1	0	4	78	102	-24	2	championship round 1	

==== Group A results ====
April 14, 2018 Round 1	Erin's Own	0-13 – 1-24	Ballyhale Shamrocks
				Venue: Tom Ryall Park
				Referee: P Burke

April 14, 2018 Round 1	Rower–Inistioge	0-19 – 2-14	Bennettsbridge
				Venue: Thomastown
				Referee: S Cleere

April 15, 2018 Round 1	O'Loughlin Gaels	1-16 – 0-11	Danesfort
				Venue: Palmerstown
				Referee: G Quilty

August 10, 2018 Round 2	Danesfort	0-14 – 1-20	Rower–Inistioge
				Venue: Mullinavat
				Referee: J Kennedy

August 11, 2018 Round 2	Ballyhale Shamrocks	0-17 – 0-20	O'Loughlin Gaels
				Venue: Danesfort
				Referee: G Rafter

August 12, 2018 Round 2	Bennettsbridge	0-16 – 0-15	Erin's Own
				Venue: Clara
				Referee: R Byrne

August 17, 2018 Round 3	Ballyhale Shamrocks	0-21 – 0-16	Danesfort
				Venue: Páirc na Seamróg
				Referee: A Barcoe

August 17, 2018 Round 3	Rower–Inistioge	2-15 – 0-10	Erin's Own
				Venue: Clara
				Referee: R Dowling

August 18, 2018 Round 3	O'Loughlin Gaels	1-17 – 1-16	Bennettsbridge
				Venue: Pairc Sheamuis Stiopháin
				Referee: O Kenny

September 1, 2018 Round 4	Ballyhale Shamrocks	2-19 – 0-19	Rower–Inistioge
				Venue: Inistioge
				Referee: S Cleere

September 1, 2018 Round 4	Bennettsbridge	1-21 – 1-22	Danesfort
				Venue: Pairc Sheamuis Stiopháin
				Referee: P Burke

September 1, 2018 Round 4	Erin's Own	1-11 – 4-17	O'Loughlin Gaels
				Venue: Pairc Lachtain
				Referee: M Flynn

September 8, 2018 Round 5	O'Loughlin Gaels	2-15 – 0-16	Rower–Inistioge
				Venue: St John's Park
				Referee: P Burke

September 8, 2018 Round 5	Danesfort	0-12 – 0-15	Erin's Own
				Venue: Jenkinstown
				Referee: O Kenny

September 8, 2018 Round 5	Ballyhale Shamrocks	0-16 – 1-17	Bennettsbridge
				Venue: Thomastown
				Referee: M Flynn

==== Group B Table ====
Team	P	W	D	L	F	A	+/-	Pts	Qualification	
James Stephens	5	4	0	1	104	92	12	8	league final	championship quarter-final
Dicksboro	5	4	0	1	112	75	37	8	shield final	championship quarter-final
Mullinavat	5	3	1	1	109	94	15	7	championship round 1	
St Patrick's	5	2	1	2	101	104	-3	5	championship round 1	
Clara	5	1	0	4	88	104	-16	2	championship round 1	
Carrickshock	5	0	0	5	73	118	-45	0	championship round 1	

==== Group B results ====
April 14, 2018 Round 1	Carrickshock	1-13 – 1-23	St Patrick's
				Venue: St John's Park
				Referee: E Mansfield

April 14, 2018 Round 1	James Stephens	0-12 – 4-18	Mullinavat
				Venue: Hugginstown
				Referee: P Cahill

April 15, 2018 Round 1	Clara	0-10 – 1-14	Dicksboro
				Venue: Gowran
				Referee: M O'Sullivan

August 10, 2018 Round 2	Dicksboro	1-12 – 2-19	James Stephens
				Venue: Nowlan Park
				Referee: R Dowling

August 11, 2018 Round 2	St Patrick's	2-19 – 1-18	Clara
				Venue: Jenkinstown
				Referee: S Cleere

August 12, 2018 Round 2	Mullinavat	1-18 – 1-15	Carrickshock
				Venue: Piltown
				Referee: M O'Sullivan

August 18, 2018 Round 3	Dicksboro	3-19 – 1-13	St Patrick's
				Venue: Pairc Lachtain
				Referee: J Kennedy

August 18, 2018 Round 3	Clara	0-16 – 2-17	Mullinavat
				Venue: Inistioge
				Referee: P Bowden

August 18, 2018 Round 3	James Stephens	0-24 – 1-12	Carrickshock
				Venue: John Locke Park
				Referee: R Byrne

September 1, 2018 Round 4	Carrickshock	1-12 – 2-17	Clara
				Venue: Gowran
				Referee: C Everard

September 1, 2018 Round 4	Mullinavat	1-12 – 2-22	Dicksboro
				Venue: John Locke Park
				Referee: M O'Sullivan

September 2, 2018 Round 4	St Patrick's	2-8 – 0-19	James Stephens
				Venue: Canon Kearns Park
				Referee: P Cahill

September 8, 2018 Round 5	Clara	2-12 – 1-21	James Stephens
				Venue: Gowran
				Referee: R Dowling

September 8, 2018 Round 5	Dicksboro	1-21 – 0-9	Carrickshock
				Venue: Dunnamaggin
				Referee: P Cahill

September 8, 2018 Round 5	St Patrick's	1-17 – 2-14	Mullinavat
				Venue: John Locke Park
				Referee: R Byrne

=== Knockout Stage ===
==== Shield Final ====
September 22, 2018	Bennettsbridge	2-17 – 2-24	Dicksboro
				Venue: Nowlan Park
				Referee: E Mansfield

==== League Final ====
September 22, 2018	O'Loughlin Gaels	1-16 – 1-17	James Stephens
				Venue: Nowlan Park
				Referee: R Dowling
