= Patsy Moran =

Irish hurler

Patsy Moran (born 1951) was an Irish hurler who played for club Kilkenny Championship clubs Muckalee/Ballyfoyle Rangers and St Martin's. He played at senior level for the Kilkenny county team for a brief period, during which time he usually lined out as a centre-forward.

== Honours ==
St Martin's

- All-Ireland Senior Club Hurling Championship (1): 1985
- Leinster Senior Club Hurling Championship (1): 1985
- Kilkenny Senior Hurling Championship (1): 1984

Kilkenny

- All-Ireland Senior Hurling Championship (1): 1979
- Leinster Senior Hurling Championship (1): 1979
