= 1991 Kilkenny Senior Hurling Championship =

Annual hurling competition season

- Dates: 20 April 1991 – 13 October 1991
- Teams: 12
- Sponsor: St. Canice's Credit Union
- Champions: Ballyhale Shamrocks (9th title); Dermot Fennelly (captain)
- Runners-up: St. Martin's
- Relegated: Mooncoin

Tournament statistics
- Matches played: 36

The 1991 Kilkenny Senior Hurling Championship was the 97th staging of the Kilkenny Senior Hurling Championship since its establishment by the Kilkenny County Board since 1887. The championship began on 20 April 1991 and ended on 13 October 1991.

Glenmore were the defending champions, however, they were beaten by St. Martin's at the semi-final stage.

On 13 October 1991, Ballyhale Shamrocks won the championship after a 3–16 to 1–08 defeat of St. Martin's in the final. It was their ninth championship title overall and their first title in two championship seasons.

== Team changes ==
=== To Championship ===
Promoted from the Kilkenny Intermediate Hurling Championship

- Mooncoin

=== From Championship ===
Relegated to the Kilkenny Intermediate Hurling Championship

- Conahy Shamrocks

== Results ==
=== Group A ===
Advance to semi-finals Advance to quarter-finals Advance to relegation play-off

==== Group A table ====
Team	Matches				Score			Pts
Team	Pld	W	D	L	For	Against	Diff	Pts
Ballyhale Shamrocks	5	4	0	1	78	58	20	8
James Stephens	5	3	0	2	78	61	17	6
Erin's Own	5	3	0	2	64	64	0	6
Graigue-Ballycallan	5	2	1	2	53	49	4	5
Graignamanagh	5	2	1	2	74	81	-7	5
Mooncoin	5	0	0	0	53	84	-31	0

==== Group A results ====
20 April 1991	Graigue-Ballycallan	1-07 - 0-06	James Stephens	John Locke Park
	J Teehan 1-1, J Ronan 0-4, N Maher 0-2.		D Cowhig 0-2, T Fogarty 0-1, L O'Connor 0-1, J Larkin 0-1, B Walton 0-1.

21 April 1991	Graignamanagh	1-15 - 2-09	Mooncoin	Hugginstown
	J Carroll 0-8, A Foley 1-1, J Prendergast 0-3, W Blanchfield 0-1, P Nolan 0-1, K Corbett 0-1.		M Colliuns 2-2, J Wall 0-2, T Murphy 0-1, T Kearns 0-1, J Vereker 0-1, T Hennebry 0-1, M Walsh 0-1.

21 April 1991	Ballyhale Shamrocks	2-12 - 0-10	Erin's Own	Nowlan Park
	B Mason 1-4, L Fennelly 1-2, T Shefflin 0-2, G Fennelly 0-2, B Fennelly 0-2.		J Brennan 0-7, J Buggy 0-3.

11 May 1991	Graigue-Ballycallan	1-12 - 0-09	Mooncoin	John Locke Park
	J Ronan 0-7, J Kenny 1-0, A Ronan 0-3, M Murphy 0-1, J Maher 0-1.		M Walsh 0-5, T Kearns 0-1, M Collins 0-1, J Murphy 0-1.

12 May 1991	Graignamanagh	4-04 - 1-12	Erin's Own	Nowlan Park
	M Dunne 2-2, J Carroll 1-2, P Prendergast 1-0.		J Brennan 0-9, C Brennan 1-0, M Brennan 0-2, J Buggy 0-1.

17 May 1991	James Stephens	3-09 - 2-10	Ballyhale Shamrocks	John Locke Park
	J Larkin 1-3, B Walton 1-0, E Connery 1-0, T Leahy 0-3, P Larkin 0-2, N Kelly 0-1.		G Fennelly 0-6, D Fennelly 1-2, L Fennelly 1-1, T Shefflin 0-1.

9 June 1991	Ballyhale Shamrocks	1-13 - 1-05	Mooncoin	Mullinavat
	G Fennelly 0-7, J Shefflin 1-1, J Lawlor 0-2, S Ryan 0-1, B Fennelly 0-1, T Phelan 0-1.		J Wall 1-0, M Walsh 0-2, J Mahon 0-1, M Collins 0-1, M Fox 0-1.

9 June 1991	Graigue-Ballycallan	1-11 - 2-08	Graignamanagh	Thomastown
	J Ronan 1-7, A Ronan 0-2, M Murphy 0-1, P Dalton 0-1.		P Prendergast 1-3, P Nolan 1-0, J Carroll 0-3, M Dunne 0-1, J Prendergast 0-1.

9 June 1991	Erin's Own	4-04 - 2-07	James Stephens	Jenkinstown
	E Connery 4-0, J Brennan 0-1, B Young 0-1, J Kelly 0-1, J Breen 0-1.		J Larkin 1-2, L O'Connor 1-0, B Walton 0-2, E Connery 0-1, L Mullan 0-1, T Fogarty 0-1.

14 September 1991	James Stephens	2-14 - 1-06	Mooncoin	John Locke Park
	B Walton 1-2, B Cody 1-1, L O'Connor 0-4, D Cowhig 0-3, J Larkin 0-3, T Leahy 0-1.		M Walsh 0-4, M Collins 1-0, N Dunphy 0-1, M Comerford 0-1.

15 September 1991	Ballyhale Shamrocks	0-16 - 2-08	Graignamanagh	Thomastown
	G Fennelly 0-6, D Fennelly 0-4, T Shefflin 0-2, L Fennelly 0-2, S Ryan 0-1, B Fennelly 0-1.		P Prendergast 2-0, J Carroll 0-3, M Walsh 0-2, J Barcoe 0-1, W Blanchfield 0-1, M Dunne 0-1.

15 September 1991	Erin's Own	1-05 - 0-05	Graigue-Ballycallan	Nowlan Park
	B Young 1-1, J Brennan 0-2, J Buggy 0-1, E Connery 0-1.		J Ronan 0-3, N Maher 0-1, J Maher 0-1.

=== Group B ===
==== Group B table ====
Team	Matches				Score			Pts
Team	Pld	W	D	L	For	Against	Diff	Pts
Glenmore	5	4	1	0	86	61	25	9
Fenians	5	3	1	1	79	71	8	7
St. Martin's	5	3	0	2	84	66	18	6
Tullaroan	5	2	1	2	68	70	-2	5
Mullinavat	5	1	1	3	60	75	-15	3
Clara	5	0	0	0	57	81	-24	0

==== Group B results ====
20 April 1991	St. Martin's	3-11 - 2-07	Tullaroan	Nowlan Park
	D Lawlor 1-7, A Lawlor 2-0, P Lawlor 0-1, L Dowling 0-1, J Brennan 0-1, C Moloney 0-1.		J Walton 1-4, S Teehan 1-1, P Lawlor 0-1, L Dowling 0-1.

21 April 1991	Glenmore	2-11 - 1-06	Fenians	Nowlan Park
	R Heffernan 0-8, J Flynn 1-1, D Mullally 1-0, D Heffernan 0-1, P Barron 0-1.		M Phelan 1-1, PJ Delaney 0-2, M Walsh 0-1, G Henderson 0-1, B Purcell 0-1.

21 April 1991	Mullinavat	3-07 - 0-10	Clara	Thomastown
	J McDonald 2-2, M Law 0-5, B Walsh 1-0.		A Prendergast 0-7, S Wherety 0-1, J Casey 0-1, P Murphy 0-1.

12 May 1991	Tullaroan	0-16 - 0-14	Clara	Nowlan Park
	P Hennessy 0-8, D Gaffney 0-4, B Hennessey 0-2, J Walton 0-1, R Walsh 0-1.		A Prenmdergast 0-6, P Murphy 0-2, L Ryan 0-2, J Casey 0-2, R Shortall 0-2.

12 May 1991	Glenmore	3-14 - 3-04	Mullinavat	Thomastown
	R Heffernan 0-7, J Heffernan 1-2, J Flynn 1-2, C Heffernan 1-0, D Ennett 0-1, M Phelan 0-1, D Mullally 0-1.		M Dunphy 2-1, P McEvoy 1-2, B Walsh 0-1.

31 May 1991	Fenians	2-13 - 0-13	St. Martin's	St. Patrick's Park
	B Purcell 2-10, K McEvoy 0-2, J Brennan 0-1.		D Lawlor 0-9, L Dowling 0-1, J Brennan 0-1, J Moran 0-1, E Morrissey 0-1.

8 June 1991	Glenmore	2-06 - 1-09	Tullaroan	Hugginstown
	J Flynn 1-3, C Heffernan 1-0, R Heffernan 0-1, P Barron 0-1, S Dollard 0-1.		P Hennessy 0-5, J Walton 1-0, D Gaffney 0-2, J Hall 0-1, D Walsh 0-1.

8 June 1991	St. Martin's	3-12 - 1-05	Clara	Nowlan Park
	D Lawlor 1-3, E Morrissey 1-2, J Brennan 0-4, C Moloney 1-0, L Dowling 0-2, J Moran 0-1.		J Nolan 1-0, L Ryan 0-2, A Prendergast 0-1, P Murphy 0-1, P Ryan 0-1.

9 June 1991	Mullinavat	2-08 - 1-11	Fenians	Nowlan Park
	L Aldridge 1-2, M Law 1-0, P McEvoy 0-3, E Law 0-1, S Foskin 0-1, M Dunphy 0-1.		B Purcell 1-4, K McEvoy 0-2, B Fitzpatrick 0-2, M Walsh 0-2, B Darmody 0-1.

14 September 1991	Glenmore	1-15 - 1-12	Clara	Bennettsbridge
	R Heffernan 0-7, C Heffernan 0-4, J Flynn 1-0, M Phelan 0-1, D Mullally 0-1, P Barron 0-1, J Heffernan 0-1.		A Prendergast 0-8, B Barcoe 1-0, R Shortall 0-3, L Ryan 0-1.

14 September 1991	St. Martin's	2-12 - 2-04	Mullinavat	Nowlan Park
	D Lawlor 1-7, E Morrissey 1-3, J Morrissey 0-1, S O'Neill 0-1.		M Dunphy 2-3, L Aldridge 0-1.

15 September 1991	Fenians	1-14 - 1-12	Tullaroan	St. Patrick's Park
	B Purcell 0-5, A McEvoy 1-0, B Fitzpatrick 0-3, PJ Delaney 0-3, P McCormack 0-1, J Brennan 0-1, B Ryan 0-1.		J Walton 0-6, B Sweeney 1-0, D Gaffney 0-3, L Keoghan 0-1, S Dunne 0-1, J Hall 0-1.

=== Relegation play-off ===
6 October 1991 Play-off	Clara	0-15 - 1-10	Mooncoin	John Locke Park, Callan
	A Prendergast 0-9, L Ryan 0-2, S Whearty 0-2, E Byrne 0-1, R Shortall 0-1.		M Walsh 1-3, T Kearns 0-2, M Collins 0-2, T Murphy 0-1, J Wall 0-1, P Doyle 0-1.	Referee: P Hayes (Graigue-Ballycallan)

=== Quarter-finals ===
22 September 1991 Quarter-final	Erin's Own	5-10 - 1-08	Fenians	Nowlan Park, Kilkenny
				Referee: P Long (Carrickshock)

22 September 1991 Quarter-final	James Stephens	3-07 - 2-15	St. Martin's	Nowlan Park, Kilkenny
	L O'Connor 1-0, B Cody 1-0, P Larkin 1-0, J Larkin 0-3, J O'Connor 0-2, J O'Dwyer 0-1.		D Lawlor 1-5, S O'Neill 1-0, J Brennan 0-3, A Lawlor 0-2, D Coonan 0-2, J Morrissey 0-1, L Dowling 0-1, E Morrissey 0-1.	Referee: J Guinan (Lisdowney)

=== Semi-finals ===
29 September 1991 Semi-final	Glenmore	0-13 - 1-12	St. Martin's	Nowlan Park, Kilkenny
	R Heffernan 0-8, S Dollard 0-2, J Heffernan 0-1, J Flynn 0-1, L Walsh 0-1.		D Lawlor 1-4, J Brennan 0-2, C Hayes 0-2, C Moloney 0-1, A Lawlor 0-1, E Morrissey 0-1, D Coonan 0-1.	Referee: D O'Sullivan (John Locke's)

29 September 1991 Semi-final	Ballyhale Shamrocks	0-17 - 0-07	Erin's Own	Nowlan Park, Kilkenny
	G Fennelly 0-5, L Fennelly 0-3, B Fennelly 0-3, J Lawlor 0-2, D Fennelly 0-2, J Shefflin 0-2.		B Young 0-2, J Brennan 0-1, J Buggy 0-1, E Holland 0-1, C Brennan 0-1, V Brannelly 0-1.	Referee: P Butler

=== Final ===
13 October 1991 Final	Ballyhale Shamrocks	3-16 - 1-08	St. Martin's	Nowlan Park, Kilkenny
	J Shefflin 1-3, D Fennelly 1-2, T Shefflin 1-1, G Fennelly 0-4, B Fennelly 0-3, L Fennelly 0-3.		E Morrissey 1-1, D Lawlor 0-4, A Lawlor 0-2, J Brennan 0-1.	Referee: P Butler
