= 1982 Kilkenny Senior Hurling Championship =

Annual hurling competition season

- Dates: 25 April – 24 October 1982
- Teams: 14
- Champions: Ballyhale Shamrocks (4th title); Liam Fennelly (captain)
- Runners-up: James Stephens; Joe Hennessy (captain)

The 1982 Kilkenny Senior Hurling Championship was the 88th staging of the Kilkenny Senior Hurling Championship since its establishment by the Kilkenny County Board in 1887. The championship ran from 25 April to 24 October 1982.

James Stephens were the defending champions.

The final was played on 24 October 1982 at Nowlan Park in Kilkenny, between Ballyhale Shamrocks and James Stephens, in what was their first ever meeting in the final. Ballyhale Shamrocks won the match by 3-10 to 2-04 to claim their fourth championship title overall and a first title in two years.

== Knockout stage ==
=== Quarter-finals ===
10 July 1982 Quarter-final	Ballyhale Shamrocks	2-13 - 2-09	Mooncoin	Carrickshock Grounds
	B Fennelly 1-5, K Fennelly 1-1, D Fennelly 0-2, M Mason 0-2, L Fennelly 0-2, G Fennelly 000-1.		M Walsh 1-1, S Delahunty 1-1, J Wall 0-3, T Hennebry 0-1, J Mahon 0-1, L Delahunty 0-1, M Corcoran 0-1.

10 July 1982 Quarter-final	St Martin's	2-10 - 0-05	Fenians	Nowlan Park
	J Brennan 0-7, T Moran 1-2, J Moran 1-0, D Coonan 0-1.		John Ryan 0-2, Joe Ryan 0-2, B Fitzpatrick 0-1.

11 July 1982 Quarter-final	Glenmore	0-21 - 3-09	Rower–Inistioge	Mullinavat Grounds
	R Heffernan 0-8, B Doherty 0-3, J Heffernan 0-3, C Heffernan 0-3, J Murphy 0-2, T Phelan 0-1, P Murphy 0-1.		E Keher 1-4, P Tierney 1-1, T Malone 1-0, M Tierney 0-2, J Lyng 0-1, M Lyng 0-1.

11 July 1982 Quarter-final	James Stephens	2-23 - 1-08	St Patrick's, Ballyragget	Nowlan Park
	D Collins 0-6, P Brennan 0-6, M Crotty 1-3, JJ Cullen 1-1, J McCormack 0-3, T McCormack 0-2, D McCormack 0-1, A Egan 0-1.		P Gannon 1-3, M Ruth 0-2, J Holland 0-1, D Staunton 0-1, J Ruth 0-1.

=== Semi-finals ===
3 October 1982 Semi-final	Ballyhale Shamrocks	1-10 - 2-06	St Martin's	Nowlan Park
	B Fennelly 0-5, M Fennelly 1-0, G Fennelly 0-2, K Fennelly 0-1, L Fennelly 0-1, D Fennelly 0-1.		T Kinsella 1-1, J Brennan 0-3, D Coonan 1-0, J Moran 0-1, T Moran 0-1.

3 October 1982 Semi-final	James Stephens	4-14 - 3-05	Glenmore	Nowlan Park
	B Walton 0-6, A Egan 2-0, N Kelly 1-1, JJ Cullen 1-1, D McCormack 0-2, D Collins 0-2, T McCormack 0-1, J McCormack 0-1.		C Hefferan 2-0, B Doherty 1-1, P Murphy 0-1, M Hefferan 0-1, J Murphy 0-1, S Phelan 0-1.

=== Final ===
24 October 1982 Final	Ballyhale Shamrocks	3-10 - 2-04	James Stephens	Nowlan Park
	M Fennelly 1-1, L Fennelly 1-0, M Kelly 1-0, G Fennelly 0-3, D Fennelly 0-3, J Walsh 0-1, B Fennelly 0-1.		JJ Cullen 1-0, P Brennan 1-0, W Walton 0-3, J McCormack 0-1.	Referee: P Long
