= 1969 Kilkenny Senior Hurling Championship =

Annual hurling competition season

- Dates: 8 June 1969 – 19 April 1970
- Teams: 15
- Champions: James Stephens (3rd title); Mickey Dunne (captain)
- Runners-up: Fenians

Tournament statistics
- Matches played: 23

The 1969 Kilkenny Senior Hurling Championship was the 75th staging of the Kilkenny Senior Hurling Championship since its establishment by the Kilkenny County Board in 1887. The championship began on 8 June 1969 and ended on 19 April 1970.

Rower-Inistioge were the defending champions, however, they were defeated by Galmoy in the second round.

On 19 April 1970, James Stephens won the championship after an 8–05 to 2–07 defeat of Fenians in the final. It was their third championship title overall and their first title since 1937.

== Format change ==
At the Kilkenny County Convention on 24 January 1969, it was decided to change the format of the championship by introducing a losers' group for teams defeated in the first round. The winners of the losers' group entered the championship proper at the semi-final stage.

== Team changes ==
=== To Championship ===
Promoted from the Kilkenny Junior Hurling Championship

- Fenians

== Results ==
=== First round ===
| 8 June 1969 First round | Bennettsbridge | 3-06 - 1-07 | Fenians | Nowlan Park, Kilkenny |

| 8 June 1969 First round | Newpark Sarsfields | 1-07 - 9-21 | St. Senan's | Thomastown Sportsfield, Thomastown |

| 8 June 1969 First round | Galmoy | 2-11 - 4-16 | Mooncoin | Nowlan Park, Kilkenny |
| | J Dillon 1-4, B Harte 1-0, J Phelan 0-3, M Phelan 0-2. | | D Holden 1-3, N Doyle 1-2, C Dunne 0-5, J Dunphy 1-1, T Ryan 1-1, J Lynch 0-3, J Doherty 0-1. |

| 15 June 1969 First round | James Stephens | 6-06 - 1-06 | Erin's Own | Nowlan Park, Kilkenny |

| 15 June 1969 First round | Coon | 2-10 - 0-07 | St. Lachtain's | Nowlan Park, Kilkenny |

| 29 June 1969 First round | Lisdowney | 2-11 - 3-10 | Young Irelands | Nowlan Park, Kilkenny |

| 29 June 1969 First round | Thomastown | 1-15 - 2-10 | Rower-Inistioge | Nowlan Park, Kilkenny |
| | | | E Keher 0-1. |

- Tullaroan received a bye.

=== Winners' group ===
==== First round ====
| 13 July 1969 Second round | Mooncoin | 1-15 - 2-09 | Thomastown | Nowlan Park, Kilkenny |
| | N Doyle 0-5, C Dunne 0-5, T Grant 1-1, J Dunphy 0-4. | | G lee 1-3, O Walsh 1-2, B O'Sullivan 0-2, T Hoyne 0-1, N Cullen 0-1. |

| 27 July 1969 Second round | Tullaroan | 1-05 - 7-14 | Bennettsbridge | Nowlan Park, Kilkenny |

| 27 July 1969 Second round | Young Irelands | 2-07 - 5-11 | Coon | Nowlan Park, Kilkenny |

| 27 July 1969 Second round | St. Senan's | 2-09 - 7-18 | James Stephens | Thomastown Sportsfield, Thomastown |

==== Second round ====
| 14 September 1969 Second round | Mooncoin | 2-09 - 2-05 | Coon | Nowlan Park, Kilkenny |

| 14 September 1969 Second round | James Stephens | 3-07 - 2-10 | Bennettsbridge | Nowlan Park, Kilkenny |

| 26 October 1969 Second round replay | James Stephens | 3-09 - 3-09 | Bennettsbridge | Nowlan Park, Kilkenny |

| 9 November 1969 Second round second replay | James Stephens | 4-03 - 2-02 | Bennettsbridge | Nowlan Park, Kilkenny |

=== Losers' group ===
==== First round ====
| 27 July 1969 First round | Fenians | 3-09 - 3-04 | St. Lachtain's | Nowlan Park, Kilkenny |

| 3 August 1969 First round | Galmoy | 3-15 - 4-04 | Erin's Own | Nowlan Park, Kilkenny |

| 3 August 1969 First round | Rower-Inistioge | 4-14 - 4-04 | Lisdowney | Nowlan Park, Kilkenny |
| | T Murphy 2-1, E Keher 0-7, G Mackey 1-0, M Kavanagh 1-0, T Waters 0-2, P Kavanagh 0-1. | | D Blanchfield 1-3, M Carroll 1-0, J Dowling 1-0, D Dunne 1-0, M Fogarty 0-1, |

==== Second round ====
| 26 October 1969 Second round | Fenians | 5-18 - 4-06 | Newpark Sarsfields | St. Patrick's Park, Ballyragget |

| 26 October 1969 Second round | Galmoy | 2-14 - 1-14 | Rower-Inistioge | Nowlan Park, Kilkenny |
| | B Harte 1-3, J Dillon 1-3, W Phelan 0-5, J Phelan 0-3. | | E Keher 1-8, T Murphy 0-2, D Kavanagh 0-2, M Kavanagh 0-1, B Murphy 0-1. |

=== Semi-finals ===
| 30 November 1969 Semi-final | James Stephens | 4-11 - 1-07 | Galmoy | Nowlan Park, Kilkenny |

| 30 November 1969 Semi-final | Fenians | 4-08 - 4-07 | Mooncoin | Nowlan Park, Kilkenny |

=== Final ===
| 19 April 1970 Final | James Stephens | 8-05 - 2-07 | Fenians | Nowlan Park, Kilkenny |
| | E Byrne 4-0, S Leahy 2-3, M Crotty 1-0, E Tallent 1-0, M Dunne 0-1, S Brennan 0-1. | | P Delaney 1-3, J Moriarty 1-0, T O'Connell 0-2, W Watson 0-1, P Henderson 0-1. | Referee: D Dowling (Glenmore) |

== Championship statistics ==
=== Miscellaneous ===
- Following their semi-final defeat, Mooncoin lodged an objection against Fenians based on an alleged illegality in the registration of a member of their team. The objection was not upheld, however, it did result in a delay to the playing of the final.
