= 2003 Kilkenny Intermediate Hurling Championship =

- Teams: 12
- Champions: Erin's Own (1st title); Ken Brennan (captain)
- Runners-up: Carrickshock

The 2003 Kilkenny Intermediate Hurling Championship was the 39th staging of the Kilkenny Intermediate Hurling Championship since its establishment by the Kilkenny County Board in 1929.

The final was played on 19 October 2003 at Nowlan Park in Kilkenny, between Erin's Own and Carrickshock, in what was their first ever meeting in the final. Erin's Own won the match by 2–12 to 1–14 to claim their first ever championship title.

== Results ==
=== Final ===
19 October 2003 Final	Erin's Own	2-12 - 1-14	Carrickshock	Nowlan Park
	D Buggy 0-8, E Brennan 1-2, J Feehan 1-0, D Byrne 0-1, A Owens 0-1.		P Farrell 1-4, R Power 0-5, J Power 0-2, P Tennyson 0-2, P Cleary 0-1.
