= 1981 Kilkenny Senior Hurling Championship =

Annual hurling competition season

- Teams: 14
- Champions: James Stephens (6th title); Brian Cody (captain)
- Runners-up: Fenians; John Henderson (captain)

The 1981 Kilkenny Senior Hurling Championship was the 87th staging of the Kilkenny Senior Hurling Championship since its establishment by the Kilkenny County Board in 1887.

Ballyhale Shamrocks entered the championship as the defending champions, however, they were beaten by Fenians in a quarter-final replay.

The final was played on 11 October 1981 at Nowlan Park in Kilkenny, between James Stephens and Fenians, in what was their fourth meeting in the final overall and a first meeting in the final in eight years. James Stephens won the match by 2-10 to 0-08 to claim their sixth championship title overall and a first title in five years.

== Knockout stage ==
=== Quarter-finals ===
22 August 1981 Quarter-final	James Stephens	1-15 - 0-10	Conahy Shamrocks	Nowlan Park
	B Walton 0-9, A Egan 1-1, J Hennessy 0-4, T McCormack 0-1.		S Muldowney 0-6, K Brennan 0-2, P Mulhall 0-1, N Mulhall 0-1.

23 August 1981 Quarter-final	Fenians	3-09 - 1-15	Ballyhale Shamrocks	Nowlan Park
	B Fitzpatrick 2-3, B Purcell 1-1, C Power 0-3, J Power 0-1, M Garrett 0-1.		G Fennelly 0-8, L Fennelly 1-0, M Fennelly 0-2, M Mason 0-1, F Holohan 0-1, B Fennelly 0-1, J Walsh 0-1, D Fennelly 0-1.

23 August 1981 Quarter-final	Muckalee/Ballyfoyle Rangers	3-15 - 3-09	Rower-Inistioge	Nowlan Park
	P Moran 2-3, J Brennan 0-8, T Moran 1-2, John Moran 0-1, D Coonan 0-1.		E Keher 2-4, M Lyng 1-1, S Lester 0-1, J Prendergast 0-1, T Malone 0-1, D Meaney 0-1.

30 August 1981 Quarter-final	Erin's Own	0-24 - 3-09	St Patrick's	Nowlan Park
	S Coogan 0-10, M Nash 0-4, Mick Brennan 0-4, S Grennan 0-3, Martin Brennan 0-2, M Fogarty 0-1.		P Gannon 0-6, S Stapleton 2-1, J Ruth 1-0, M O'Shea 0-1, M Ruth 0-1.

30 August 1981 Quarter-final replay	Fenians	2-11 - 1-12	Ballyhale Shamrocks	Nowlan Park
	B Fitzpatrick 1-6, G Henderson 1-0, P Delaney 0-3, E Grehan 0-1, B Purcell 0-1.		G Fennelly 1-7, B Fennelly 0-1, M Fennelly 0-1, S Grace 0-1, M Kelly 0-1, R Reid 0-1.

=== Semi-finals ===
27 September 1981 Semi-final	James Stephens	0-16 - 0-07	Muckalee/Ballyfoyle Rangers	Nowlan Park
	B Walton 0-8, J McCormack 0-3, P Brennan 0-2, D McCormack 0-1, A Egan 0-1, M Crotty 0-1.		J Brennan 0-4, P Moran 0-1, T Moran 0-1, D Coonan 0-1.

27 September 1981 Semi-final	Fenians	2-15 - 2-07	Erin's Own	Nowlan Park
	B Purcell 2-2, B Fitzpatrick 0-5, G Henderson 0-3, P Delaney 0-2, M Garrett 0-1, E Grehan 0-1, J Power 0-1.		M Nash 1-3, E Wallace 1-0, S Brennan 0-2, M Brennan 0-1, S Coogan 0-1.

=== Final ===
11 October 1981 Final	James Stephens	2-10 - 0-08	Fenians	Nowlan Park
	A Egan 1-1, B Walton 0-4, M Crotty 1-0, J McCormack 0-2, D McCormack 0-1, T McCormack 0-1, J O'Brien 0-1.		B Fitzpatrick 0-4, W Purcell 0-2, P Delaney 0-1, M Garrett 0-1.
