= 1997 Kilkenny Intermediate Hurling Championship =

- Dates: 15 August - 19 October 1997
- Teams: 12
- Sponsor: Vale Oil
- Champions: Ballyhale Shamrocks (2nd title); Pádraic Farrell (captain)
- Runners-up: Graignamanagh; Johnny Prendergast (captain)
- Relegated: Carrickshock

Tournament statistics
- Matches played: 15
- Goals scored: 37 (2.47 per match)
- Points scored: 351 (23.4 per match)
- Top scorer(s): John Carroll (4-25)

The 1997 Kilkenny Intermediate Hurling Championship was the 33rd staging of the Kilkenny Intermediate Hurling Championship since its establishment by the Kilkenny County Board in 1929. The championship began on 15 August 1997 and ended on 19 October 1997.

The final was played on 19 October 1997 at Nowlan Park in Kilkenny, between Ballyhale Shamrocks and Graignamanagh, in what was their first meeting in a final in this grade in 23 years. Ballyhale Shamrocks won the match by 4-12 to 3-07 to claim their second championship title overall and a first title since 1974.

Graignamanagh's John Carroll was the championship's top scorer with 4-25.

== Results ==
=== First round ===
15 August 1997 First round	Mullinavat	1-10 - 0-09	Thomastown	Páirc na Seamróg
	W Carroll 1-1, Mossy Murphy 0-2, Michael Murphy 0-2, P Hoban 0-2, R Carroll 0-1, J Rohan 0-1, M Dunphy 0-1.		P Treacy 0-4, B O'Keeffe 0-2, R Bolger 0-1, N Holden 0-1, T O'Keeffe 0-1.

16 August 1997 First round	Rower-Inistioge	2-15 - 1-12	Piltown	Mullinavat GAA Grounds
	M Doyle 0-6, P Sheehan 1-2, G Fitzpatrick 1-2, E Bolger 0-2, R Kelly 0-2, B Cotterell 0-1.		J Connolly 0-7, P Long 1-0, K O'Shea 0-2, M Long 0-2, M Brennan 0-1.

17 August 1997 First round	Graignamangh	1-10 - 1-10	Carrickshock	Thomastown GAA Grounds
	C Dunne 1-2, J Carroll 0-2, N Dunne 0-1, G Walsh 0-1, A Foley 0-1, J Prendergast 0-1, J Bolger 0-1, W Blanchfield 0-1.		B Hudson 1-2, C Dwyer 0-5, P Dwyer 0-2, J O'Gorman 0-1.

17 August 1997 First round	Ballyhale Shamrocks	1-09 - 0-12	John Locke's	Carrickshock GAA Grounds
	D Mason 1-2, C Harrington 0-2, J Shefflin 0-1, N O'Keeffe 0-1, D Fennelly 0-1, T Shefflin 0-1, H Shefflin 0-1.		PJ Cody 0-8, D Lynch 0-1, A Power 0-1, D Maher 0-1, J Power 0-1.

23 August 1997 First round replay	Graignamangh	1-12 - 0-09	Carrickshock	Thomastown GAA Grounds
	J Carroll 1-6, M Dunne 0-3, C Dunne 0-2, G Walsh 0-1.		A Hudson 1-3, B Hudson 0-2, W Duggan 0-1, W Barron 0-1, R Power 0-1, C Dwyer 0-1.

23 August 1997 First round replay	Ballyhale Shamrocks	1-13 - 0-10	John Locke's	Carrickshock GAA Grounds
	B Aylward 0-5, C Harrington 1-0, H Shefflin 0-3, N O'Keeffe 0-2, J Shefflin 0-2, D Mason 0-1.		PJ Cody 0-08, JP Corcoran 0-1, J Power 0-1.

=== Relegation playoffs ===
30 August 1997 Semi-final	Thomastown	0-18 - 1-10	Piltown	Mullinavat GAA Grounds
				Referee: J Guinan (Lisdowney)

20 September 1997 Final	Piltown	2-11 - 0-14	Carrickshock	Mullinavat GAA Grounds

=== Quarter-finals ===
30 August 1997 Quarter-final	Mullinavat	3-16 - 2-13	Clara	Thomastown GAA Grounds
	M Dunphy 1-10, P Hoban 1-1, R Carroll 0-4, W Carroll 1-0, M Murphy 0-1.		A Prendergast 1-7, R Moore 1-2, R Shortall 0-3, P Barcoe 0-1.

30 August 1997 Quarter-final	Ballyhale Shamrocks	2-12 - 0-16	Conahy Shamrocks	Nowlan Park
	C Harrington 1-3, B Aylward 0-6, H Shefflin 1-2, S Fennelly 0-1.		C Muldowney 0-6, C Connery 0-3, B Griffith 0-2, E Murphy 0-2, J Feehan 0-1, C Brennan 0-1, G Brennan 0-1.

30 August 1997 Quarter-final	Rower-Inistioge	1-15 - 2-11	St. Lachtain's	Bennettsbridge GAA Grounds
	M Doyle 1-10, P Sheehan 0-2, P Cotterell 0-1, G Fitzpatrick 0-1, E Bolger 0-1.		O O'Connor 1-8, D Anderson 1-0, J Costello 0-2, E Maher 0-1.

6 September 1997 Quarter-final	Graignamanagh	2-14 - 1-09	Bennettsbridge	Thomastown GAA Grounds
	J Carroll 1-9, A Foley 1-1, J Bolger 0-2, J Whelan 0-1, N Dunne 0-1.		L Cleere 0-4, F Cleere 1-0, R Moran 0-2, P Lennon 0-1, J Byrne 0-1, Jimmy Lennon 0-1.

=== Semi-finals ===
5 October 1997 Semi-final	Graignamanagh	2-11 - 1-09	Rower-Inistioge	Nowlan Park
	J Carroll 1-3, J Prendergast 1-1, N Dunne 0-2, G Walsh 0-1, J Bolger 0-1, M Dunne 0-1, J Whelan 0-1, C Dunne 0-1.		P Sheehan 1-2, M Doyle 0-5, P Cotterell 0-1, E Bolger 0-1.

5 October 1997 Semi-final	Ballyhale Shamrocks	2-12 - 0-10	Mullinavat	Nowlan Park
	C Harrington 0-5, D Fennelly 1-1, J Shefflin 1-0, S Fennelly 0-2, B Aylward 0-1, N O'Keeffe 0-1, T Shefflin 0-1, D Mason 0-1.		M Dunphy 0-5, P Hoban 0-2, R Carroll 0-1, O Aylward 0-1, Michael Murphy 0-1.

=== Final ===
19 October 1997 Final	Ballyhale Shamrocks	4-12 - 3-07	Graignamanagh	Nowlan Park
	H Shefflin 1-6, C Harrington 1-1, N O'Keeffe 1-0, D Mason 1-0, J Shefflin 0-3, T Shefflin 0-2.		J Carroll 1-5, M Dunne 2-0, J Whelan 0-1, C Dunne 0-1.

== Championship statistics ==
=== Top scorers ===
Top scorers overall

Rank	Player	Club	Tally	Total	Matches	Average
1	John Carroll	Graignamanagh	4-25	37	5	7.40
2	PJ Cody	John Lockes	1-21	24	3	8.00
3	Conor Harrington	Ballyhale Shamrocks	3-11	20	5	4.00
4	Michael Dunphy	Mullinavat	1-16	19	3	6.33
5	Henry Shefflin	Ballyhale Shamrocks	2-12	18	5	3.60
