= 2002 Kilkenny Intermediate Hurling Championship =

- Dates: 26 July - 13 October 2002
- Teams: 12
- Sponsor: Vale Oil
- Champions: St Martin's (3rd title); Niall Moloney (captain)
- Runners-up: Carrickshock

The 2002 Kilkenny Intermediate Hurling Championship was the 38th staging of the Kilkenny Intermediate Hurling Championship since its establishment by the Kilkenny County Board in 1929. The championship ran from 26 July to 13 October 2002.

The final was played on 13 October 2002 at Nowlan Park in Kilkenny, between St Martin's and Carrickshock, in what was their first ever meeting in the final. St Martin's won the match by 0–14 to 0–13 to claim their second championship title overall and a first championship title in 27 years.

== Results ==
=== Final ===
13 October 2002 Final	St Martin's	0-14 - 0-13	Carrickshock	Nowlan Park
	D Lawlor 0-9, S Coonan 0-2, P Maher 0-2, E McGrath 0-1.		R Power 0-7, M Rohan 0-2, M Rice 0-1, P Cleary 0-1, J Power 0-1, B Tennyson 0-1.
