= 1978 Kilkenny Senior Hurling Championship =

Annual hurling competition season

- Champions: Ballyhale Shamrocks (1st title); Denis Shefflin (captain)
- Runners-up: Fenians

The 1978 Kilkenny Senior Hurling Championship was the 84th staging of the Kilkenny Senior Hurling Championship since its establishment by the Kilkenny County Board.

Fenians were the defending champions.

On 22 October 1978, Ballyhale Shamrocks won the championship after a 0–15 to 0–10 defeat of Fenians in the final. It was their first ever championship title.

== Results ==
=== Group 1 ===
==== Group 1 table ====
Team	Matches				Score			Pts
Team	Pld	W	D	L	For	Against	Diff	Pts
Bennettsbridge	x	x	x	x	x-xx	x-xx	x	x
Erin's Own	x	x	x	x	x-xx	x-xx	x	x
James Stephens	x	x	x	x	x-xx	x-xx	x	x
Graignamanagh	x	x	x	x	x-xx	x-xx	x	x
Ballyhale Shamrocks	x	x	x	x	x-xx	x-xx	x	x
Conahy Shamrocks	x	x	x	x	x-xx	x-xx	x	x

==== Group 1 results ====
13 May 1978	Conahy Shamrocks	3-08 - 5-09	Ballyhale Shamrocks	Nowlan Park
	P Mulhall 1-4, N Brennan 1-2, M Buggy 1-0, K Brennan 0-1, S Muldowney 0-1.		M Fennelly 3-0, K Fennelly 1-2, L Fennelly 1-0, B Fennelly 0-2, G Fennelly 0-2, M Dempsey 0-2, S Reid 0-1.

14 May 1978	Bennettsbridge	1-03 - 0-13	Erin's Own	Nowlan Park
	R Comerford 1-0, P Kealy 0-1, J Walsh 0-1, J Dowling 0-1.		M Nash 0-5, E Brennan (R) 0-2, M Brennan (Cloney) 0-2, S Coogan 0-2, M Coogan 0-1, B Brien 0-1.

14 May 1978	Graignamanagh	0-08 - 1-16	James Stephens	Thomastown Sportsfield
	P Prendergast 0-2, T Dowling 0-2, J Cody 0-2, J Gahan 0-1, T Foley 0-1.		J McCormack 0-6, M Taylor 1-1, E Morrissey 0-3, M Crotty 0-2, J Hennessy 0-1, B Cody 0-1, T Butler 0-1, S Brennan 0-1.

20 May 1978	James Stephens	8-14 - 0-03	Conahy Shamrocks	Nowlan Park
	M Taylor 2-2, J McCormack 2-2, E Morrisssey 2-1, S Brennan 2-0, J Hennessy 0-5, T Butler 0-2, M Crotty 0-1, T McCormack 0-1.		M Buggy 0-1, S Muldowney 0-1, P Brennan 0-1.

21 May 1978	Graignamanagh	0-04 - 5-08	Bennettsbridge	Thomastown Sportsfield
	J Cody 0-2, S Grady 0-1, J Gahan 0-1.		N Skehan 2-1, E Lawlor 1-2, B O'Brien 1-1, S McGarry 1-0, J Walsh 0-2, J Dowling 0-2.

28 May 1978	Ballyhale Shamrocks	1-14 - 2-09	Erin's Own	Nowlan Park
	K Fennelly 0-6, G Fennelly 0-5, M Fennelly 1-0, B Fennelly 0-2, R Reid 0-1.		M Nash 0-7, S Brennan 1-0, E Brennan 1-0, E Wallace 0-1, S Coogan 0-1.

4 June 1978	Conahy Shamrocks	1-07 - 0-07	Graignamanagh	Nowlan Park

4 June 1978	James Stephens	5-09 - 0-11	Erin's Own	Nowlan Park

4 June 1978	Bennettsbridge	4-01 - 3-11	Ballyhale Shamrocks	Thomastown Sportsfield

==== Group 2 table ====
Team	Matches				Score			Pts
Team	Pld	W	D	L	For	Against	Diff	Pts
Windgap	x	x	x	x	x-xx	x-xx	x	x
Rower-Inistioge	x	x	x	x	x-xx	x-xx	x	x
Fenians	x	x	x	x	x-xx	x-xx	x	x
Mooncoin	x	x	x	x	x-xx	x-xx	x	x
Muckalee/Ballyfoyle Rangers	x	x	x	x	x-xx	x-xx	x	x
Galmoy	x	x	x	x	x-xx	x-xx	x	x
St. Lachtains	x	x	x	x	x-xx	x-xx	x	x

=== Group 2 ===
==== Group 2 results ====
14 May 1978	Galmoy	2-07 - 2-11	Muckalee/Ballyfoyle Rangers	Nowlan Park
	J Phelan 1-1, W Phelan 0-4, B Harte 1-0, J Doherty 0-2.		D Nolan 1-1, J Moran 0-4, T Moran 0-4, P Maher 1-0, J Walsh 0-2.

14 May 1978	Rower-Inistioge	2-18 - 3-05	Windgap	Nowlan Park
	P Grace 1-4, E Keher 0-7, T Malone 1-0, G Murphy 0-2, S Lester 0-2, M Tierney 0-1, M Lyng 0-1, P Treacy 0-1.		K Purcell 1-3, T Barry 1-1, J O'Shea 0-1, E Cronan 0-1.

21 May 1978	St. Lachtain's	0-14 - 1-11	Galmoy	St. Patrick's Park
	B Waldron 0-9, N Hughes 0-2, M Kennedy 0-1, M Morrissey 0-1, G McCarthy 0-1.		J Phelan 1-2, W Phelan 0-3, B Harte 0-3, J Doherty 0-2, M Lonergan 0-1.

21 May 1978	Fenians	2-11 - 2-11	Rower-Inistioge	Nowlan Park
	B Fitzpatrick 1-3, J Ryan 1-2, G Henderson 0-2, P Delaney 0-2, J Power 0-1, M Garrett 0-1.		E Keher 1-6, G Murphy 1-2, P Grace 0-1, P Treacy 0-1, M Lyng 0-1.

21 May 1978	Muckalee/Ballyfoyle	2-11 - 2-09	Mooncoin	Nowlan Park
	T Moran 1-1, J Brennan 0-4, D Coonan 1-0, J Walsh 0-2, J Moran 0-2, M Maher 0-1, D Nolan 0-1.		E Crowley 0-4, T Henebry (Ballybrazzil) 1-0, T Henebry 1-0, J Wall 0-3, D Grace 0-2.

28 May 1978	Fenians	6-06 - 0-10	Mooncoin	Nowlan Park
	P Delaney 3-0, B Fitzpatrick 1-4, J Ryan 1-1, J Power 1-0, B Watson 0-1.		E Crowley 0-9, T Henebry 0-1.

3 June 1978	Fenians	2-16 - 0-08	Windgap	Nowlan Park

4 June 1978	St. Lachtain's	2-12 - 3-11	Muckalee/Ballyfoyle Rangers	Nowlan Park

4 June 1978	Rower-Inistioge	1-15 - 1-09	Mooncoin	Mullinavat Sportsfield

=== Semi-finals ===
17 September 1978 Semi-final	Ballyhale Shamrocks	2-17 - 2-10	Rower-Inistioge	Nowlan Park
	G Fennelly 0-7, P Holden 1-1, B Fennelly 0-4, L Fennelly 1-0, K Fennelly 0-3, J Walsh 0-1, M Kelly 0-1..		E Keher 1-6, J Lyng 0-4, T Malone 1-0.

17 September 1978 Semi-final	Fenians	1-07 - 3-03 (declared void)	James Stephens	Nowlan Park

8 October 1978 Semi-final replay	Fenians	1-08 - 1-03	James Stephens	Nowlan Park
	B Fitzpatrick 1-8.		B Cody 1-0, L O'Brien 0-2, M Crotty 0-1.

=== Final ===
22 October 1978 Final	Ballyhale Shamrocks	0-15 - 0-10	Fenians	Nowlan Park, Kilkenny
	G Fennelly 0-5, B Fennelly 0-3, M Fennelly 0-2, P Holden 0-2, K Fennelly 0-1, J Walsh 0-1.		B Fitzpatrick 0-3, B Broderick 0-3, P Henderson 0-1, P Delaney 0-1, J Moriarty 0-1, B Watson 0-1.	Referee: M Meally (Railyard)

== Championship statistics ==
=== Miscellaneous ===
- The first-round match between Erin's Own and Bennettsbridge saw 15-year-old Richard McCarthy make his championship debut for the latter team when he was introduced as a substitute for goalkeeper Noel Skehan.
- The semi-final between James Stephens and Fenians was abandoned after 49 minutes after a pitch invasion by supporters.
