= Brian Feeney =

Brian Feeney may refer to:

- Brian Feeney (engineer), leader of the da Vinci Project
- Brian Feeney (hurler) (born 1970), Irish retired hurler
