= 1980 Kilkenny Senior Hurling Championship =

Annual hurling competition season

- Teams: 14
- Champions: Ballyhale Shamrocks (3rd title); Richie Reid (captain)
- Runners-up: Muckalee/Ballyfoyle Rangers; Tony Maher (captain)

The 1980 Kilkenny Senior Hurling Championship was the 86th staging of the Kilkenny Senior Hurling Championship since its establishment by the Kilkenny County Board in 1887.

Ballyhale Shamrocks were the defending champions.

On 2 November 1980, Ballyhale Shamrocks won the championship after a 3–13 to 1–10 defeat of Muckalee/Ballyfoyle Rangers in the final replay. It was their third championship title overall and their third title in succession.

== Results ==
=== Group 1 ===
==== Table ====
Advanced to quarter-finals Advanced to relegation play-off

Team	Matches				Score			Pts
Team	Pld	W	D	L	For	Against	Diff	Pts
Muckalee/Ballyfoyle Rangers	6	5	1	0	13-75	6-50	46	11
Fenians	6	5	1	0	7-77	6-41	39	11
Erin's Own	6	3	0	3	10-63	9-57	9	6
Galmoy	6	3	0	3	17-47	14-58	-2	6
Conahy Shamrocks	6	3	0	3	9-55	8-54	4	6
Bennettsbridge	6	1	0	5	10-36	11-63	-30	2
Windgap	6	0	0	6	9-48	21-77	-71	0

=== Group 2 ===
==== Table ====
Advanced to quarter-finals Advanced to relegation play-off

Team	Matches				Score			Pts
Team	Pld	W	D	L	For	Against	Diff	Pts
Ballyhale Shamrocks	6	4	2	0	9-67	14-40	12	10
James Stephens	6	4	1	1	11-62	11-44	18	9
Rower-Inistioge	6	3	3	0	19-50	14-47	18	9
St. Patrick's	6	2	2	2	20-52	14-61	9	6
O'Loughlin Gaels	6	2	0	4	14-53	9-63	5	4
St. Lachtain's	6	2	0	4	9-63	14-54	-6	2
Mooncoin	6	0	0	6	11-30	27-68	-86	0

=== Play-offs ===
2 August 1980 Play-off	Erin's Own	3-13 - 1-05	Galmoy	Nowlan Park, Kilkenny
	T Brennan 2-1, M 'China' Brennan 1-3, P Boran 0-2, M 'Cloney' Brennan 0-2, E Wallace 0-2.		B Harte 1-1, L Norton 0-2, J Whelan 0-1, W Phelan 0-1.	Referee: D Butler

9 August 1980 Play-off	Galmoy	5-09 - 2-11	Conahy Shamrocks	Nowlan Park, Kilkenny
	J Phelan 3-5, W Phelan 1-3, B Harte 1-1.		N Mulhall 2-2, K Brennan 0-4, P Brennan 0-3, P Mulhall 0-1, K Mulhall 0-1.	Referee: M Meally (Railyard)

=== Quarter-finals ===
23 August 1980 Quarter-final	Rower-Inistioge	2-09 - 2-17	Fenians	Nowlan Park, Kilkenny
	E Keher 2-5, J Prendergast 0-3, S Lester 0-1.		B Purcell 1-6, P Delaney 1-3, B Fitzpatrick 0-4, J Ryan 0-2, E Graham 0-1, B Broderick 0-1.	Referee: M Meally (Railyard)

24 August 1980 Quarter-final	St. Patrick's	1-05 - 2-16	Muckalee/Ballyfoyle Rangers	Nowlan Park, Kilkenny
	M ruth 1-2, J Brophy 0-1, B Murphy 0-1, J Ruth 0-1.		T Moran 1-6, D Nolan 1-0, M Maher 0-2, D Coonan 0-2, P Moran 0-2, P Maher 0-2, J Moran 0-1, M Morrissey 0-1.	Referee: J Murphy (Tullogher)

24 August 1980 Quarter-final	Ballyhale Shamrocks	4-13 - 0-09	Galmoy	Nowlan Park, Kilkenny
	G Fennelly 2-4, B Fennelly 1-2, M Dempsey 1-0, L Fennelly 0-3, S Reid 0-2, W Phelan 0-1, M Kelly 0-1.		W Harte 0-3, W Phelan 0-3, MJ Ryan 0-2, E Cullinane 0-1.	Referee: D Butler (Frehsford)

24 August 1980 Quarter-final	James Stephens	2-12 - 1-10	Erin's Own	Nowlan Park, Kilkenny
	A Egan 2-0, L O'Brien 0-4, D McCormack 0-3, J McCormack 0-3, B Cody 0-2.		M Nash 0-5, S Coogan 1-1, M 'Cloney' Brennan 0-2, M 'China' Brennan 0-1, E Brennan 0-1.	Referee: P Long (Stoneyford)

=== Semi-finals ===
28 September 1980 Semi-final	James Stephens	1-07 - 1-07	Ballyhale Shamrocks	Nowlan Park, Kilkenny
	B Walton 0-6, L O'Brien 1-0, A Egan 0-1.		G Fennelly 1-04, M Fennelly 0-1, B Fennelly 0-1, L Fennelly 0-1.	Referee: M Meally (Railyard)

28 September 1980 Semi-final	Muckalee/Ballyfoyle Rangers	3-13 - 1-08	Fenians	Nowlan Park, Kilkenny
	T Moran 2-6, D Nolan 1-0, J Brennan 0-3, P Moran 0-2, John Moran 0-1, M Morrissey 0-1.		M Garrett 1-2, B Fitzpatrick 0-4, G Henderson 0-1, P Delaney 0-1.	Referee: P Long (Stoneyford)

5 October 1980 Semi-final replay	James Stephens	0-12 - 2-13	Ballyhale Shamrocks	Nowlan Park, Kilkenny
	L O'Brien0-6, B Walton 0-3, J McCormack 0-2, J Hennessy 0-1.		G Fennelly 2-5, M Fennelly 0-2, S Reid 0-2, L Fennelly 0-2, S Fennelly 0-1, B Fennelly 0-1.	Referee: M Meally (Railyard)

=== Final ===
19 October 1980 Final	Ballyhale Shamrocks	3-10 - 2-13	Muckalee/Ballyfoyle Rangers	Nowlan Park, Kilkenny
	L Fennelly 2-0, G Fennelly 0-6, M Kelly 1-0, B Fennelly 0-3, M Fennelly 0-1.		J Brennan 0-9, T Moran 1-2, P Moran 1-0, J Moran 0-1, M Morrissey 0-1.

2 November 1980 Final replay	Ballyhale Shamrocks	3-13 - 1-10	Muckalee/Ballyfoyle Rangers	Nowlan Park, Kilkenny
	G Fennelly 1-5, L Fennelly 2-0, S Grace 0-3, M Kelly 0-2, S Fennelly 0-1, M Fennelly 0-1, J Walsh 0-1.		J Brennan 0-7, T Moran 1-2, D Coonan 0-1.	Referee: M Meally (Railward)
