= 1935 Kilkenny Senior Hurling Championship =

Annual hurling competition season

- Champions: James Stephens (1st title); Paddy Larkin (captain)
- Runners-up: Carrickshock; Jimmy Walsh (captain)

The 1935 Kilkenny Senior Hurling Championship was the 41st staging of the Kilkenny Senior Hurling Championship since its establishment by the Kilkenny County Board.

James Stephens won the championship after a 3–05 to 2–05 defeat of Carrickshock in the final. It was their first-ever championship title. Carrickshock became the first team to lose four successive finals.

== Results ==
=== Final ===
8 December 1935 Final	James Stephens	3-05 - 2-05	Carrickshock	Nowlan Park
