= 1990 All-Ireland Under-21 Hurling Championship final =

1990 All-Ireland Under-21 Hurling Championship Final
- Event: 1990 All-Ireland Under-21 Hurling Championship
Kilkenny	Tipperary
2-11	1-11
- Date: 9 September 1990
- Venue: O'Moore Park, Portlaoise
- Referee: Pat Delaney (Laois)

The 1990 All-Ireland Under-21 Hurling Championship final was a hurling match that was played at O'Moore Park, Portlaoise on 9 September 1990 to determine the winners of the 1990 All-Ireland Under-21 Hurling Championship, the 27th season of the All-Ireland Under-21 Hurling Championship, a tournament organised by the Gaelic Athletic Association for the champion teams of the four provinces of Ireland. The final was contested by Kilkenny of Leinster and Tipperary of Munster, with Kilkenny winning by 2-11 to 1-11.

== Match ==
=== Details ===
9 September 1990

Kilkenny	2-11 – 1-11	Tipperary
A Ronan 0-6, DJ Carey 1-1, P Treacy 1-0, J Brennan 0-2, P O'Grady 0-1, J Lawlor 0-1.		L Sheedy 0-7, G Deely 1-1, D Lyons 0-1, P O'Brien 0-1, K McCormack 0-1.

O'Moore Park, Portlaoise
Referee: P Delaney (Laois)
