= Martin Coogan (hurler) =

Irish hurler

Personal information
- Native name: Máirtín Ó Cuagáin (Irish)
- Nickname: "Coogan"
- Born: Castlecomer, County Kilkenny

Sport
- Sport: Hurling
- Position: Half-back
Club
- Years: Club
- Erin's Own
Inter-county
- Years: County
- 1961–1973: Kilkenny
Inter-county titles
- Leinster titles: 7
- All-Irelands: 4
- All Stars: 1

Martin Coogan (born 1940) is a former Irish sportsperson. He played hurling with his local club Erin's Own with the Kilkenny senior inter-county team from 1961 until 1973.

== Playing career ==
In 1962, he tasted his first major success when he won a National Hurling League medal with his county. the 1962 title was Kilkenny's first since 1933.

In 1963, Coogan won his first Leinster title, that same year he played in his first All-Ireland final at Croke Park. Waterford provided the opposition on that occasion, however, Eddie Keher's tally of fourteen points guaranteed a victory for Kilkenny and a first All-Ireland medal for Coogan.

In 1964 Coogan won a second Leinster title following another huge win over Dublin. Tipperary provided the opposition in 1964's the All-Ireland final, however, in spite of Kilkenny being the pundits' favorites the men from Munster completely overpowered Coogan's side on a score line of 5–13 to 2–8.

Kilkenny lost their provincial crown in 1965, however, the team bounced back in 1966 with Coogan collecting a second National League medal and a third Leinster title. Kilkenny later faced Cork in the All-Ireland final for the first time since 1947 and, once again, the Leinster champions were the red-hot favorites over a Cork side that were not expected to compete. However, the young 'Rebels' ambushed Kilkenny in the game and the All-Ireland title went to Cork for the first time in twelve years.

The following year Kilkenny continued their provincial dominance with Coogan picking up a fourth Leinster title before lining out in a fourth All-Ireland final at Croke Park. Tipperary were Kilkenny's opponents on the day. That day 'the Cats' had goals at vital times from Paddy Moran, Martin Brennan and Tom Walsh to lay to rest a Tipperary bogey that had lasted since 1922. Kilkenny won with a score of 3–8 to Tipperary's 2–7. Coogan collected his second All-Ireland medal.

While Wexford ended Kilkenny's hopes of retaining the Leinster championship title in 1968, the team won the 1969 provincial championship and Coogan collected a fifth Leinster medal. Cork faced Kilkenny in the subsequent 1969 All-Ireland final. Early in the game it looked as if Cork would triumph over their rivals once again, however, five points from Kilkenny in the last seven minutes gave Coogan a third All-Ireland medal.

1971, saw Coogan capture a sixth provincial medal as Kilkenny began to assert their dominance over Wexford. The Leinster champions later played Tipperary in the only eighty-minute All Ireland final between the sides. Tipperary emerged the victors on a score line of 5–17 to 5–14.

In 1972, Coogan won a seventh Leinster title following a victory over Wexford in a replay of the provincial final. Once again, Cork provided the opposition in the 1972 All-Ireland final, a game which is often considered to be one of the classic games of the modern era. In the game itself Coogan came on as a substitute as Kilkenny came from behind to win the game comfortably. This was Coogan's last major success, and he retired from inter-county hurling in 1973.

=== Provincial ===
Coogan also won a Railway Cup medal with Leinster in 1967.

== Criminal conviction ==
In June 1996, Coogan was convicted of indecent assault on two young girls and sentenced to four years in jail. The former player, a father-of-two, was found guilty of indecently assaulting 10-year-old girl nine years previously. He also pleaded guilty to indecently assaulting a nine-year-old girl 12 years previously. His appeals of his sentence were unsuccessful.
