= Jamesie Brennan =

Kilkenny hurler

Personal information
- Native name: Séamus Ó Braonáin (Irish)
- Nickname: Shiner
- Born: 7 December 1969 (age 56) Castlecomer, County Kilkenny, Ireland
- Occupation: Carpenter
- Height: 5 ft 6 in (168 cm)

Sport
- Sport: Hurling
- Position: Left wing-forward
Clubs
- Years: Club
- 19??–1995 1995–1997: Erin's Own; O'Tooles
Club titles
- Dublin titles: 3
Inter-county
Years	County	Apps (scores)
1990–1995	Kilkenny; Dublin	8 (1–4)
Inter-county titles
- Leinster titles: 3
- All-Irelands: 2
- NHL: 0
- All Stars: 0

Jamesie Brennan (born 7 December 1969) is an Irish former hurler who played as a left corner-forward for the Kilkenny senior team.

Brennan made his first appearance for the team during the 1990–91 National League and was a regular member of the starting fifteen until his retirement after the 1995 championship. An All-Ireland-winning captain in the under-21 grade, Brennan later won two All-Ireland medals and three Leinster medals at senior level.

At club level Brennan played with Erin's Own and O'Tooles (in Dublin), winning the Dublin Senior Hurling Championship with the northside club.

James Brennan now works for South Dublin County Council.

Achievements
Preceded by Declan Ryan (Tipperary)	All-Ireland Under-21 HC winning captain 1990	Succeeded by Brian Feeney (Galway)
