= David Buggy =

Irish hurler (born 1975)

Personal information
- Native name: Daithí Ó Bogaigh (Irish)
- Nickname: Davy
- Born: 20 March 1975 (age 51) Castlecomer, County Kilkenny, Ireland
- Occupation: Car salesman
- Height: 5 ft 11 in (180 cm)

Sport
- Sport: Hurling
- Position: Full-forward
Club
Years	Club	Apps (scores)
1993-2009	Erin's Own	31 (11-64)
Club titles
	Football	Hurling
Kilkenny titles	2	0
Inter-county
Years	County	Apps (scores)
1999	Kilkenny	0 (0-00)
Inter-county titles
- Leinster titles: 1
- All-Irelands: 0
- NHL: 0
- All Stars: 0

David Joseph Buggy (born 20 March 1975) is an Irish former hurler. At club level he played with Erin's Own and was also a member of the Kilkenny senior hurling team. He usually lined out in the forwards.

== Career ==
Buggy first came to prominence at juvenile and underage levels with the Erin's Own club in Castlecomer before quickly joining the club's top adult teams as a dual player. He enjoyed County Intermediate Championship successes in 2003 and 2008.

Buggy first appeared on the inter-county scene with the Kilkenny minor team and scored 1-03 against Galway in the 1993 All-Ireland final. His subsequent tenure with the Kilkenny under-21 team saw defeat by Tipperary in the 1995 All-Ireland final. Buggy was drafted onto the Kilkenny senior hurling team by manager Ollie Walsh in 1994, however, he remained on the fringes of the team for a number of seasons without making a breakthrough. He was a non-playing substitute when Kilkenny lost the 1999 All-Ireland final to Cork.

== Honours ==
Erin's Own

- Kilkenny Senior Football Championship: 2002, 2006
- Kilkenny Intermediate Hurling Championship: 2003, 2008

Kilkenny

- Leinster Senior Hurling Championship: 1999
- Leinster Under-21 Hurling Championship: 1995
- All-Ireland Minor Hurling Championship: 1993
- Leinster Minor Hurling Championship: 1993
