= 1983 Kilkenny Senior Hurling Championship =

Annual hurling competition season

- Champions: Ballyhale Shamrocks (5th title); Kevin Fennelly (captain)
- Runners-up: James Stephens; Mick Crotty (captain)

The 1983 Kilkenny Senior Hurling Championship was the 89th staging of the Kilkenny Senior Hurling Championship since its establishment by the Kilkenny County Board. in 1887.

Ballyhale Shamrocks were the defending champions.

On 9 October 1983, Ballyhale Shamrocks won the championship after a 2–14 to 1–08 defeat of James Stephens in the final. It was their fifth championship title overall and their second title in succession.

== Knockout stage ==
=== Semi-finals ===
25 September 1983 Semi-final	James Stephens	1-17 - 3-08	Fenians	Nowlan Park
	M Crotty 1-3, J McCormack 0-6, D Collins 0-3, N Kelly 0-2, JJ Cullen 0-2, A Egan 0-1.		B Fitzpatrick 1-2, E Grehin 1-0, Jim Power 1-0, M Garrett 0-3, John Power 0-1, B Purcell 0-1, J Ryan 0-1.

25 September 1983 Semi-final	Ballyhale Shamrocks	4-11 - 4-06	Clara	Nowlan Park
	D Fennelly 1-3, K Fennelly 1-2, L Fennelly 1-0, M Fennelly 1-0, G Fennelly 0-3, M Kelly 0-3.		A Prendergast 2-3, P Campion 1-0, G Nolan 1-0, Lester Ryan 0-2, D Connolly 0-1.

=== Final ===
9 October 1983 Final	Ballyhale Shamrocks	2-14 - 1-08	James Stephens	Nowlan Park
	L Fennelly 0-5, D Fennelly 1-1, K Fennelly 0-4, M Kelly 1-0, M Fennelly 0-3, J Walsh 0-1.		T McCormack 1-0, J McCormack 0-3, B Walton 0-2, M Crotty 0-1, JJ Cullen 0-1, A Egan 0-1.
