= 1988 Kilkenny Senior Hurling Championship =

Annual hurling competition season

- Champions: Ballyhale Shamrocks (7th title); Seán Fennelly (captain)
- Runners-up: Thomastown; Martin Walsh (captain)

The 1988 Kilkenny Senior Hurling Championship was the 94th staging of the Kilkenny Senior Hurling Championship since its establishment by the Kilkenny County Board.

Glenmore were the defending champions.

Ballyhale Shamrocks won the championship after a 2–15 to 0–04 defeat of Thomastown in the final. It was their seventh championship title overall and their first title in three championship seasons.

== Results ==
=== Final ===
| 1 October 1988 Final | Ballyhale Shamrocks | 2-15 - 0-04 | Thomastown | Nowlan Park |
| | G Fennelly 0-9, T Phelan 1-2, B Fennelly 1-1, J Lawlor 0-2, L Fennelly 0-1. | | T O'Keeffe 0-3, G Walsh 0-1. | Referee: T Duggan (Mullinavat) |
