= 1937 Kilkenny Senior Hurling Championship =

Annual hurling competition season

- Champions: James Stephens (2nd title); Paddy Larkin (captain)
- Runners-up: Dicksboro

The 1937 Kilkenny Senior Hurling Championship was the 43rd staging of the Kilkenny Senior Hurling Championship since its establishment by the Kilkenny County Board.

James Stephens won the championship after a 3–08 to 1–02 defeat of Dicksboro in the final. It was their second championship title overall and their first title in two championship seasons.

== Results ==
=== Final ===
26 September 1937 Final	James Stephens	3-08 - 1-02	Dicksboro	Nowlan Park
