= 1990 All-Ireland Under-21 Hurling Championship =

All-Ireland Under-21 Hurling Championship 1990
Championship Details
- Dates: 6 June 1990 – 9 September 1990

All Ireland Champions
- Winners: Kilkenny (5th win)
- Captain: Jamesie Brennan

All Ireland Runners-up
- Runners-up: Tipperary
- Captain: John Leahy

Provincial Champions
- Munster: Tipperary
- Leinster: Kilkenny
- Ulster: Down
- Connacht: Not Played

Championship Statistics
- Top Scorer: Jamesie Brennan (0-25)

The 1990 All-Ireland Under-21 Hurling Championship was the 27th staging of the All-Ireland Under-21 Hurling Championship since its establishment by the Gaelic Athletic Association in 1964. The championship began on 6 June 1990 ended on 9 September 1990.

Tipperary entered the championship as the defending champions.

On 9 September 1990, Kilkenny won the championship after a 2–11 to 1–11 defeat of Tipperary in the All-Ireland final. This was their fifth All-Ireland title overall and their first title since 1985.

Kilkenny's Jamesie Brennan was the championship's top scorer with 0-25.

== Results ==
=== Leinster Under-21 Hurling Championship ===
First round

6 June 1990 First round	Kilkenny	1–22 – 0–04	Wicklow	Dr. Cullen Park, Carlow
	J Brennan 0–9, P Treacy 1–1, J Lawlor 0–4, C Carter 0–4, T Murphy 0–1, J Buggy 0–1, B Ryan 0–1, P O'Grady 0–1.		D Myres 0–1, D Curran 0–1, N Byrne 0–1, N Goggin 0–1.

Semi-finals

20 June 1990 Semi-final	Laois	4–12 – 2–10	Wexford	Nowlan Park, Kilkenny
	T Dunne 3–3, M O'Hara 1–2, L O'Mahony 0–5, E Kirwan 0–1, S Stapleton 0–1.		R Quigley 0–4, M O'Leary 0–4, A Coll 1–0, S O'Leary 1–0, R Callaghan 0–2.

27 June 1990 Semi-final	Kilkenny	4–11 – 1–09	Offaly	O'Moore Park, Portlaoise
	DJ Carey 2–0, C Carter 1–3, A Ronan 1–2, J Brennan 0–3, J Lawlor 0–3.		D Pilkington 0–5, E Mulhare 1–0, J Dooley 0–2, J Troy 0–1, J Pilkington 0–1.

Final

15 July 1990 Final	Kilkenny	2–09 – 1–10	Laois	Dr. Cullen Park, Carlow
	DJ Carey 1–4, B Ryan 1–0, L Brennan 0–2, J Lawlor 0–1, T Shefflin 0–1, J Walsh 0–1.		M O'Hara 0–7, T Dunne 1–1, J Bates 0–1, N Delaney 0–1.	Referee: P Horan (Offaly)

=== Munster Under-21 Hurling Championship ===
Quarter-final

16 June 1992 Quarter-final	Kerry	0–06 – 1–05	Waterford	Fr. Breen Park, Kenmare
	T Maunsell 0–3, E O'Shea 0–1, E O'Connor 0–1, E O'Connor 0–1.		M Kelly 1–1, D Power 0–2, P Queally 0–1, P Prendergast 0–1.

20 June 1990 Quarter-final	Clare	2–11 – 2–05	Cork	FitzGerald Park, Kilmallock
	P Kealy 1–4, P Minogue 0–4, C Clancy 1–0, M Daffy 0–1, F Tuohy 0–1, M McKenna 0–1.		B Cunningham 1–3, J O'Connor 1–0, K Roche 0–1, D Quirke 0–1.

Semi-finals

5 July 1990 Semi-final	Clare	0–12 – 1–11	Limerick	Cusack Park, Ennis
	P Minogue 0–7, M Daffy 0–2, M McNamara 0–1, F Tuohy 0–1, C Clancy 0–1.		J Fitzgibbon 1–0, A Fitzgerald 0–3, M Hickey 0–3, G Galvin 0–3, M Houlihan 0–2.	Referee: G Ryan (Tipperary)

5 July 1990 Semi-final	Tipperary	2–13 – 2–11	Waterford	Semple Stadium, Thurles
	L Sheedy 0–7, D Lyons 1–2, A Wall 1–1, P O'Brien 0–3.		S Daly 1–8, N Kelly 1–0, M Kelly 0–1, B Greene 0–1, J Meaney 0–1.	Referee: K Walsh (Limerick)

Final

25 July 1990 Final	Limerick	1–11 – 2–21	Tipperary	Gaelic Grounds, Limerick
	R Walsh 1–0, M Houlihan 0–3, C Galvin 0–2, J Fitzgibbon 0–2, M Hickey 0–1, C Carey 0–1, F Carroll 0–1, A Fitzgerald 0–1.		L Sheedy 0–9, P O'Brien 1–2, A Wall 1–1, C Egan 0–4, J Leahy 0–3, D Lyons 0–2.	Referee: J Moore (Waterford)

=== Ulster Under-21 Hurling Championship ===
Final

22 July 1990 Final	Down	2-09 – 2-06	Antrim	McKenna Park, Ballycran
	B Coulter 0-4, E Blaney 1-0, C Smyth 1-0, P Coulter 0-2, G Savage 0-1, B Gallagher 0-1, S Mallon 0-1.		G O'Kane 1-1, E McKee 1-0, J Carson 0-2, K McKernan 0-2, J Close 0-1.

=== All-Ireland Under-21 Hurling Championship ===
Semi-finals

18 August 1990 Semi-final	Tipperary	6–13 – 0–08	Down	Parnell Park, Dublin
	A Wall 2–3, D Lyons 2–0, J Leahy 0–5, P O'Brien 1–1, G Deeley 1–0, L Sheedy 0–1, K Ryan 0–1, M O'Meara 0–1, B Corcoran 0–1.		K Blaney 0–4, P Coulter 0–2, G McGratton 0–2.

19 August 1990 Semi-final	Kilkenny	2–16 – 1–13	Galway	Gaelic Grounds, Limerick
	J Brennan 0–9, C Carter 2–2, DJ Carey 0–2, P Murphy 0–1, B McGovern 0–1, A Ronan 0–1.		M Killilea 0–4, F Meehan 1–0, J Rabbitte 0–3, D Curley 0–2, G Keane 0–2, P Kelly 0–1, R Bourke 0–1.

Final

9 September 1990 Final	Tipperary	1–11 – 2–11	Kilkenny	O'Moore Park, Portlaoise
	L Sheedy 0–7, G Deely 1–1, D Lyons 0–1, P O'Brien 0–1, K McCormack 0–1.		A Ronan 0–6, DJ Carey 1–1, P Treacy 1–0, J Brennan 0–2, P O'Grady 0–1, J Lawlor 0–1.	Referee: P Delaney (Laois)

== Championship statistics ==
=== Top scorers ===
Overall

Rank	Player	County	Tally	Total	Matches	Average
1	Jamesie Brennan	Kilkenny	0-25	25	5	5.00
2	Liam Sheedy	Tipperary	0-24	24	4	6.00
3	D. J. Carey	Kilkenny	4-07	19	5	3.80
4	Charlie Carter	Kilkenny	3-09	18	5	3.60
5	Anthony Wall	Tipperary	4-05	17	4	4.25
