= 1974 Kilkenny Intermediate Hurling Championship =

- Dates: 28 April - 20 October 1974
- Champions: Ballyhale Shamrocks (1st title)
- Runners-up: Graignamanagh

The 1974 Kilkenny Intermediate Hurling Championship was the tenth staging of the Kilkenny Intermediate Hurling Championship since its establishment by the Kilkenny County Board in 1929. The championship began on 28 April 1974 and ended on 20 October 1974.

The final was played on 20 October 1974 at Nowlan Park in Kilkenny, between Ballyhale Shamrocks and Graignamanagh, in what was their first meeting in a final. Ballyhale Shamrocks won the match by 3-09 to 2-06 to claim their first championship title.

== Results ==
=== Semi-finals ===
29 September 1974 Semi-final	Ballyhale Shamrocks	2-19 - 2-07	Paulstown	Nowlan Park

29 September 1974 Semi-final	Graignamanagh	5-09 - 0-07	Dicksboro	Nowlan Park

=== Final ===
20 October 1974 Final	Ballyhale Shamrocks	3-09 - 2-06	Graignamanagh	Nowlan Park
