= 1975 Kilkenny Intermediate Hurling Championship =

- Teams: 5
- Champions: Muckalee/Ballyfoyle Rangers (1st title)
- Runners-up: Graignamanagh

The 1975 Kilkenny Intermediate Hurling Championship was the 11th staging of the Kilkenny Intermediate Hurling Championship since its establishment by the Kilkenny County Board in 1929.

The final was played on 31 August 1975 at Nowlan Park in Kilkenny, between Muckalee/Ballyfoyle Rangers and Graignamanagh, in what was their first meeting in a final. Muckalee/Ballyfoyle Rangers won the match by 4-11 to 1-09 to claim their first championship title.

== Results ==
=== Semi-finals ===
17 August 1975 Semi-final	Graignamanagh	2-11 - 1-09	Paulstown	Thomastown GAA Grounds

17 August 1975 Semi-final	Muckalee/Ballyfoyle Rangers	3-08 - 0-04	Dicksboro	Nowlan Park

=== Final ===
31 August 1975 Final	Muckalee/Ballyfoyle Rangers	4-11 - 1-09	Graignamanagh	Nowlan Park
