= Brian Feeney (hurler) =

Irish hurler

Personal information
- Native name: Brian Ó Fiannaí (Irish)
- Born: 1970 (age 55–56) Athenry, County Galway, Ireland

Sport
- Sport: Hurling
- Position: Centre-back
Club
- Years: Club
- 1987-2007: Athenry
Club titles
- Galway titles: 8
- Connacht titles: 8
- All-Ireland Titles: 3
Inter-county
- Years: County
- 1991-2000: Galway
Inter-county titles
- All-Irelands: 0
- NHL: 1
- All Stars: 0

Brian Feeney (born 1970) is an Irish former hurler who played as a centre-back for the Galway senior team.

An All-Ireland-winning captain in the under-21 grade, Feeney made his first appearance for the senior team during the 1991-92 National League and became a regular member of the team over much of the next decade. During that time he won one National Hurling League winners' medal.

At club level Feeney is a three-time All-Ireland medalist with Athenry. In addition to this he has also won eight Connacht medals and eight county club championship medals.

Achievements
Preceded by Jamesie Brennan (Kilkenny)	All-Ireland Under-21 Hurling Final winning captain 1991	Succeeded by Tony Browne (Waterford)
Preceded by Gerry McInerney (Sixmilebridge)	All-Ireland Senior Club Hurling Final winning captain 1996-97	Succeeded by Joe Errity (Birr)
