= Muckalee/Ballyfoyle Rangers GAA =

Muckalee/Ballyfoyle Rangers
- Maigh Coillí/Raonaithe Bhaile an Phoill
- Founded: 1971
- County: Kilkenny
- Colours: Red and white
- Grounds: Muckalee

Playing kits
Standard colours

Senior Club Championships
	All Ireland	Leinster champions	Kilkenny champions
Hurling:	0	0	0

Muckalee/Ballyfoyle Rangers GAA was a Gaelic Athletic Association club located in the Muckalee and Ballyfoyle areas of County Kilkenny, Ireland. The club was primarily concerned with the game of hurling.

== History ==
The Muckalee/Ballyfoyle Rangers club was formed in 1971. The new club claimed the Kilkenny JHC title after a defeat of Mullinavat in 1974. It gained a second promotion just a year later when senior status was secured by winning the Kilkenny IHC. Muckalee/Ballyfoyle Rangers's time in the top flight saw them lose the 1980 SHC final to Ballyhale Shamrocks. Muckalee/Ballyfoyle Rangers amalgamated with the Coon club in 1982, resulting in the creation of the St. Martin's club.

== Honours ==
- Kilkenny Intermediate Hurling Championship (1): 1975
- Kilkenny Junior Hurling Championship (1): 1974
- Northern Kilkenny Junior Hurling Championship (1): 1974

== Notable players ==
- Patsy Moran: All-Ireland SHC-winner (1979)
