= Ballyhale Shamrocks GAA =

Gaelic games club in County Kilkenny, Ireland

Ballyhale Shamrocks
- Seamróga Baile hÉil
- Founded: 1972
- County: Kilkenny
- Nickname: The Shamrocks
- Colours
- Grounds: Páirc na Seamróg
- Coordinates: 52°27′43.48″N 7°12′48.69″W

Playing kits
Home Kit	Change Kit

Senior Club Championships
	All Ireland	Leinster champions	Kilkenny champions
Football:	0	0	3
Hurling:	9	12	22

Ballyhale Shamrocks is a Gaelic Athletic Association club located in Ballyhale, County Kilkenny, Ireland. The club is affiliated to the Kilkenny County Board and fields teams in both hurling and Gaelic football.

== Foundation ==
Gaelic games had been played by a number of clubs in the parish of Ballyhale long before a singular club was established. By the early 1970s there were two competing clubs in existence in the parish, Ballyhale and Knocktopher, however, they both struggled for numbers. Both clubs combined to field minor teams in the 1960s. A third club, Knockmoylan, had also operated in the parish before disbanding. In January 1972, Ballyhale and Knocktopher amalgamated at all levels to form a new club called Ballyhale Shamrocks. The club adopted a three-leaf shamrock as its crest, with the letters KBK, representing the three clubs that had existed in the parish, inserted on each leaf.

== History ==
Success for the new club was instant, with Ballyhale Shamrocks beating Thomastown by 2–12 to 3–05 to win the Kilkenny JHC title in 1973. A second successive promotion followed in 1974, with the club claiming the Kilkenny IHC and senior status for the first time. Ballyhale Shamrocks won their inaugural Kilkenny SHC title in 1978, after a 0–15 to 0–10 win over Fenians in the final. This was subsequently converted into a Leinster Club SHC title, before a 5–07 to 5–05 defeat by Blackrock in the 1979 All-Ireland Club SHC final. The club retained the Kilkenny SHC title in 1979 and 1980, before also winning a second Leinster Club SHC title. In May 1981, Ballyhale Shamrocks, with a team featuring seven Fennelly brothers, beat St Finbarr's by 1-15 to 1-11 to win their first All-Ireland Club SHC title.

Four consecutive Kilkenny SHC titles in 1981 proved beyond Ballyhale Shamrocks, however, the club once again claimed back-to-back titles in 1982 and 1983. The second of these was later converted into a third Leinster Club SHC title, before Ballyhale became the first Kilkenny team to win a second All-Ireland Club SHC title, after beating Gort in the 1984 All-Ireland Club SHC final replay. The club continued to dominate the Kilkenny SHC, with further titles wins in 1985, 1988 and 1989. The decade ended with Ballyhale Shamrocks winning a fourth Leinster Club SHC title, before a 1-16 to 0-16 win over Ballybrown secured a record-equalling third All-Ireland Club SHC title. The 1991 Kilkenny SHC final 14-point defeat of St Martin's proved to be an era-ending title win.

After a 15-year period without senior success, as well as relegation to the Kilkenny IHC in 1995, Ballyhale Shamrocks emerged with a new team featuring Henry Shefflin, T. J. Reid and Michael Fennelly. The club won four consecutive Kilkenny SHC titles between 2006 and 2009, as well as three Leinster Club SHC titles during the same period. In March 2007, the club joined Birr at the top of the all-time roll of honour when they won a fourth All-Ireland Club SHC title after a 3–12 to 2–08 defeat of Loughrea. Ballyhale Shamrocks became the most successful team in the history of the competition, when they won a record fifth All-Ireland Club SHC title in March 2010, after a 1-19 to 0-17 win over Portumna in the 2010 All-Ireland Club SHC final.

Respective finals defeats of Dicksboro (2012) and Clara (2014) brought Ballyhale's Kilkenny SHC title tally to 15.. The second of these titles was subsequently conveterted into a record eighth Leinster Club SHC title. Shamrocks won a sixth All-Ireland Club SHC title in March 2015, following a 1-18 to 1-06 win over Kilmallock in the 2015 All-Ireland Club SHC final. Between 2018 and 2022, Ballyhale won a record five consecutive Kilkenny SHC titles, with a new team featuring Evan Shefflin, Eoin Cody and Adrian Mullen. Four Leinster Club SHC titles were also won during this period, with further All-Ireland Club SHC final defeats of St Thomas' (2019), Borris–Ileigh (2020) and Dunloy (2023).

In October 2025, Ballyhale Shamrocks won a record 21st Kilkenny SHC title, following a 1-18 to 0-12 win over O'Loughlin Gaels in the final. Shamrock retained the title the following year, following a 2-24 to 0-08 win over Tullaroan.

== Honours ==
- All-Ireland Senior Club Hurling Championship (9): 1981, 1984, 1990, 2007, 2010, 2015 2019, 2020, 2023
- Leinster Senior Club Hurling Championship (12): 1978, 1980, 1983, 1989, 2006, 2008, 2009, 2014, 2018, 2019, 2021, 2022
- Kilkenny Senior Hurling Championship (22): 1978, 1979, 1980, 1982, 1983, 1985, 1988, 1989, 1991, 2006, 2007, 2008, 2009, 2012, 2014, 2018, 2019, 2020, 2021, 2022, 2025, 2026
- Kilkenny Senior Football Championship (3): 1979, 1980, 1982
- Kilkenny Senior Hurling League (9): 1992, 2005, 2006, 2007, 2008, 2009, 2011, 2016, 2026
- Kilkenny Intermediate Hurling Championship (2): 1974, 1997
- Kilkenny Intermediate Football Championship (1): 1992
- Kilkenny Junior Hurling Championship (1): 1973
- Kilkenny Junior Football Championship (5): 1975, 1991, 2002, 2008, 2012
- Southern Kilkenny Junior Hurling Championship (2): 1973, 1983
- Kilkenny Under-21 A Hurling Championship (9): 1972, 1973, 1974, 2003, 2004, 2005, 2006, 2017, 2018

== Notable players ==
- Ger Fennelly: All-Ireland SHC-winning captain (1979)
- Liam Fennelly: All-Ireland SHC-winning captain (1983, 1992)
- Henry Shefflin: All-Ireland SHC-winning captain (2007)
- James "Cha" Fitzpatrick: All-Ireland SHC-winning captain (2008)
- Michael Fennelly: All-Ireland SHC-winning captain (2009)
- Joey Holden: All-Ireland SHC-winning captain (2015)

== Managerial history ==
Manager(s)	From	To	Titles won		
Manager(s)	From	To	All-Ireland	Leinster	Kilkenny
Maurice Aylward	2005	2008	1	2	3
Mick Fennelly; James McGarry	2009	2011	1	1	1
Tommy Shefflin	2012	2013			1
Andy Moloney	2014	2017	1	1	1
Henry Shefflin	2017	2019	2	2	2
James O'Connor	2020	2021		1	2
Pat Hoban	2022	2024	1	1	1
Henry Shefflin	2024	2025			1
Mark Aylward	2026				1
