= James Stephens GAA =

Gaelic games club in County Kilkenny, Ireland

James Stephens
- Séamus Stiopháin
- Founded: 1887
- County: Kilkenny
- Nickname: The Village
- Colours
- Grounds: Páirc Shéamuis Stiopháin
- Coordinates: 52°38′34.72″N 7°14′40.30″W

Playing kits
Standard colours

Senior Club Championships
	All Ireland	Leinster champions	Kilkenny champions
Football:	0	0	8
Hurling:	3	4	9

James Stephens GAA & Camogie Club is a Gaelic Athletic Association club located in Kilkenny, Ireland. The club is affiliated to the Kilkenny County Board and fields teams in hurling, Gaelic football and camogie.

== Foundation ==
Located in Kilkenny city centre, James Stephens GAA Club was founded in the small working class area of Patrick Street in 1887. The club is named in honour of James Stephens, the Kilkenny-born founder-member of the Irish Republican Brotherhood.

== History ==
James Stephens spent it's early years operating in the junior ranks. In 1924, the club adopted the green and red colours after purchasing a second-hand set of jerseys from the disbanded Erin's Own club. The new jerseys brought success, as James Stephens also won their inaugural Kilkenny JHC title that year after a defeat of Thomastown in a replay. The club claimed a second Kilkenny JHC title in 1929.

James Stephens made their Kilkenny SHC breakthrough in 1935, when the club claimed their inaugural title after a 3–05 to 2–05 win over Carrickshock in the final. Two years later, James Stephens celebrated their golden jubilee by winning their second Kilkenny SHC title after a 3–08 to 1–02 defeat of Dicksboro. Shortly after these title successes, the club returned to the junior grade. The introduction of the Three Parish Rule in 1953 changed the fortunes of a number of clubs in Kilkenny. This rule which aimed to prevent the rise of dominant super clubs and required clubs to reorganise so that no team drew from more than three parishes James Stephens were one of the early beneficiaries of the rule, as they claimed their third Kilkenny JHC title in 1955.

James Stephens returned to the summit of Kilkenny club hurling once again in 1969, when an 8–05 to 2–07 win over Fenians secured the club's third Kilkenny SHC title. This win ushered in the most successful era in the history of the club, with players such as Fan Larkin, Brian Cody, Joe Hennessy and Liam O'Brien backboning the team. James Stephens claimed a fourth Kilkenny SHC title in 1975, following a 1–14 to 1–05 defeat of first-time finalists Galmoy. This was subsequently converted into a Leinster Club SHC title, before James Stephens beat Blackrock by 2–10 to 2–04 in the 1976 All-Ireland Club SHC final, to become the first Kilkenny club to win the title. The club later retained their Kilkenny SHC title in 1976, after beating Rower–Inistioge by 2–14 to 0–13 in the final. James Stephens's most successful era came to a close in 1982, when the club claimed their second All-Ireland Club SHC title following a 3–13 to 3–08 win over Mount Sion.

While hurling has always been the dominant sport within the club, James Stephens also had numerous Gaelic football successes. The club's first Kilkenny SFC title was won in 1976, following a 1–09 to 0–06 win over Railyard in the final. While the club's hurling fortunes took a downturn, James Stephens dominated the Kilkenny SFC and won a further five titles between 1988 and 1996. The club brought their Kilkenny SFC title tally to eight, with further wins in 2002 and 2008.

The first decade of the 21st century saw a new James Stephens hurling team emerge, with players such as Jackie Tyrrell, Eoin Larkin and Peter Barry. The latter captained James Stephens to their seventh Kilkenny SHC title in 2004, following a 2–16 to 3–12 defeat of Young Irelands. The club later won a third Leinster Club SHC title, before beating Athenry by 0–19 to 0–14 to claim a third All-Ireland Club SHC title. Barry was once again team captain when James Stephens retained their Kilkenny SHC and Leinster Club SHC titles in 2005.

James Stephens won their ninth and final Kilkenny SHC title in 2011, when Jackie Tyrrell captained the team to a 1–20 to 0–15 defeat of Ballyhale Shamrocks in a replay. The club endured Kilkenny SHC final defeats in 2017, 2019 and 2022. In October 2024, the club's 69-year tenure in the Kilkenny SHC ended when they were relegated after losing a playoff to Glenmore. James Stephens made a return to the top tier after claiming the Kilkenny IHC title in 2026, following a 1–16 to 0–16 defeat of Rower-Inistioge.

== Honours ==
- All-Ireland Senior Club Hurling Championship (3): 1976, 1982, 2005
- Leinster Senior Club Hurling Championship (4): 1975, 1981, 2004, 2005
- Kilkenny Senior Hurling Championship (9): 1935, 1937, 1969, 1975, 1976, 1981, 2004, 2005, 2011
- Kilkenny Senior Football Championship (8): 1976, 1988, 1991, 1993, 1995, 1996, 2003, 2008
- Kilkenny Senior Hurling League (2): 2010, 2018
- Kilkenny Intermediate Hurling Championship (1): 2026
- Kilkenny Junior Hurling Championship (4): 1924, 1929, 1955, 2000
- Kilkenny Junior B Hurling Championship (1): 2026
- Kilkenny Under-21 A Hurling Championship (7): 1969, 1970, 1987, 1993, 1994, 2000, 2002
- Kilkenny Minor A Hurling Championships (15): 1929, 1957, 1966, 1968, 1970, 1971, 1982, 1985, 1986, 1991, 1992, 2003, 2012, 2023, 2024
- Kilkenny Minor A Football Championship (11): 1983, 1985, 1986, 1987, 1988, 1990, 1991, 1992, 1993, 1996, 1997, 2011, 2012, 2017

== Notable players ==
- Brian Cody: All-Ireland SHC-winning captain (1982)
- Jackie Tyrrell: All-Ireland SHC-winning captain (2006)
- Eoin Larkin: All-Ireland SHC-winning captain (2012)
