= Erin's Own GAA (Kilkenny) =

Gaelic games club in County Kilkenny, Ireland

Erin's Own
- Erin's Own
- Founded: 1885
- County: Kilkenny
- Nickname: Rogha Éireann
- Colours: Blue and White
- Grounds: Canon Kearns Park
- Coordinates: 52°48′20.99″N 7°12′43.72″W

Playing kits
Standard colours

Senior Club Championships
	All Ireland	{{{province}}} champions	Kilkenny champions
Football:	-	-	2

Erin's Own Gaelic Athletic Association was founded in 1885 and since then has been the main sporting organization in the Castlecomer area in County Kilkenny, Ireland.

Erin's Own fielded teams in 11 different grades of hurling and in 7 grades of gaelic football in 2006, and is currently undertaking major development at its new ground, Canon Kearns Park.

With a membership of about 20 adults and about 100 youths the club is in the enviable position of having two properties, the first, The Prince Grounds, in the town, and the second, Canon Kearns Park, on the outskirts of the town, towards Kilkenny.

== History ==
Erin's Own has enjoyed senior status since 1958, and while the Senior hurling title remains elusive, hundreds of players and supporters have derived great enjoyment from the club over the years.

In 1979, Erins Own reached their only Kilkenny Senior Hurling Championship final, opponents on the day were Ballyhale Shamrocks. The game was a draw (0−14 apiece) and the replay was abandoned midway through following an accidental pull by an Erins Own player which resulted in a mass brawl. The score at the time was Ballyhale 3−12, Erins Own 1−6. The team on the day was: Eddie Mahon, Tom Cloney Brennan, Martin Coogan (Capt), Donal Dunne, Tommy Brennan, Peter Boran, Martin Fogarty, Eamonn Wallace, Joe O' Neill, Michael Nash, Mick Cloney Brennan, Seamus Brennan, Eamonn Brennan, Mick China Brennan, Terry Brennan

The club has won titles in all grades of Hurling and Football except the Kilkenny Senior Hurling Championship. In 2001 both titles were in sight, with the Hurlers losing the League final and reaching the Championship semi-final, while the footballers went even closer, losing the final in a replay.

== The Prince Grounds ==
The Prince Grounds has been home to Erin's Own since the 1950s at least. During the '50s the Prince was owned by the Wandesforde family, the landlords of the Castlecomer estate. Erin's Own purchased the property outright in the 1960s.

In the early days hurling was not the only sport to be played at the Prince, the ground seeing plenty of hockey played, and even some cricket. In the '70s and '80s the club regularly loaned the pitch to the local soccer team while they were acquiring and developing their own premises next door. During the Emergency the field was ploughed up for agricultural purposes.

In the late 1950s, when 'Comer won the Junior Championship, dressing rooms and showers were installed – then a novel facility! The Prince was one of few grounds so equipped in the county at the time. The building was galvanized, with timber supports and a timber floor, while the showers were "cold" and were supplied by a large rainwater tank on the roof. This facility really stood the test of time and served the club right up until the present building was erected in 1994. When the team was training for the Championship in '58 they would finish up a session with a run to the Deerpark Mines, where they were allowed use the "Baths" (new hot showers for the miners).

== Canon Kearns Park ==
On 19 May 1986, Erin's Own acquired a second property at Ballycomey, on the Kilkenny side of town. The money for purchase of the grounds was raised through the "Piltown Draw". The field was leveled and a fine pitch constructed and there was enough money in the kitty to commence building a clubhouse. However, disaster struck when the club was notified by the County Council that the property could not be used for sporting purposes. A few worrying years passed when it was feared that a ball would never be struck in the new field. However, following all sorts of appeals and deputations, on 16 June 1993 permission was granted and spirits rose.

Unfortunately the "kitty" had dwindled over the years to naught. The pitch was progressed and railings were erected. The goals went up and little by little "Ballycomey" started to come to life. With the club's day-to-day running costs so high, any plans for building were put on the back burner.

Towards the end of 1998, Kieran Meally thought it was time to get something built at Ballycomey. He volunteered to spearhead the drive. At the AGM, Meally was formally appointed chairman of the Development Committee. On 25 January 1999 his committee's first meeting was held. First item on the agenda, at Kieran's insistence, was that the grounds be named "Canon Kearns Park" in memory of Canon John Kearns, former parish priest of Castlecomer. This was unanimously agreed, and work commenced developing adventurous plans and deciding how the funds would be raised. The project would be known as "Canon Kearns Park − Millennium Project" and while everybody was hopeful that major progress would have taken place by the turn of the new millennium, realistically it was agreed that it could in fact take the next millennium to complete them!

In January 2000, with a start imminent, the club suffered a major, major setback! Meally died following a brief but serious illness. It took some time to gather the pieces and get motivated to work on, but now the development had taken on a new meaning. Not only was it for "The Club", it was now also for Kieran. At the first meeting following Kieran's death another unanimous decision was made, that the clubhouse be named "Áras Ó Meallaigh" in honour of Kieran Meally.

== Players ==
- Martin Fogarty

== Honours ==
Most recently Erins Own have one Intermediate title to their name and two county football titles as well as a Minor A hurling Championship and an O'Byrne Cup title. In 2008, Erins Own beat Mullinavat to claim the second of those two football titles. Marty Connolly, Gordon Byrne, Paul Mullins, Paddy Coady and Nicky (the builder) Walsh later went on to represent Kilkenny in the much coveted Tommy Murphy Cup.

- Kilkenny Senior Football Championship: (2) 2002, 2006
- Kilkenny Intermediate Hurling Championship: (2) 2003, 2008
- Kilkenny Junior Hurling Championship: (1) 1958
- Kilkenny Minor Hurling Championship (2) 1927, 1987, 2008
- Kilkenny Under-21 Hurling Championship (3) 1978, 1989, 1990

== See also ==
- Kilkenny Senior Hurling Championship
