= Johnny McGovern =

Irish hurler (1932–2022)

Personal information
- Native name: Seán Mac Shabhráin (Irish)
- Born: 7 March 1932 Bennettsbridge, County Kilkenny, Ireland
- Died: 24 February 2022 (aged 89) Bennettsbridge, County Kilkenny, Ireland
- Occupation: Oil company employee
- Height: 5 ft 7 in (170 cm)

Sport
- Sport: Hurling
- Position: Left wing-back
Club
- Years: Club
- 1950–1971: Bennettsbridge
Club titles
- Kilkenny titles: 11
Inter-county
- Years: County
- 1952–1964: Kilkenny
Inter-county titles
- Leinster titles: 6
- All-Irelands: 2
- NHL: 1

John McGovern (7 March 1932 – 24 February 2022) was an Irish hurler who played at club level with Bennettsbridge and at inter-county level with the Kilkenny senior hurling team. He usually lined out as a wing-back.

== Playing career ==
McGovern first came to prominence as a hurler at club level with Bennettsbridge. In a career that spanned 21 years, he won a record eleven Kilkenny SHC titles. McGovern first appeared on the inter-county scene during a two-year stint with the Kilkenny minor hurling team and ended his time in that grade with a defeat of Tipperary in the 1950 All-Ireland minor final. McGovern subsequently earned inclusion on the Kilkenny senior hurling team and served as team captain in his debut season in 1953. His senior career brought All-Ireland triumphs over Waterford in 1957 and 1963. McGovern's other inter-county honours included six Leinster Championships and a National League title. He won a Railway Cup medal as captain of Leinster in 1954.

== Management career ==
In retirement from inter-county hurling, McGovern joined the selection committee of the Kilkenny senior hurling team in 1967. His eleven-year association with the team yielded five All-Ireland Championships, numerous Leinster Championships and a National League title.

== Personal life and death ==
McGovern was born in Bennettsbridge, County Kilkenny in March 1932. He began his working life with Bennettsbridge Creamery before later working with Esso. McGovern died in Bennettsbridge on 24 February 2022, at the age of 89.

== Honours ==
=== Player ===
Bennettsbridge

- Kilkenny Senior Hurling Championship: 1952, 1953, 1955, 1956, 1959, 1960, 1962, 1964, 1966, 1967, 1971

Kilkenny

- All-Ireland Senior Hurling Championship: 1957, 1963
- Leinster Senior Hurling Championship: 1953 (c), 1957, 1958, 1959, 1963, 1964
- National Hurling League: 1961–62
- All-Ireland Minor Hurling Championship: 1950
- Leinster Minor Hurling Championship: 1949, 1950

Leinster

- Railway Cup: 1954 (c)

=== Selector ===
Kilkenny

- All-Ireland Senior Hurling Championship: 1967, 1969, 1972, 1974, 1975
- Leinster Senior Hurling Championship: 1967, 1969, 1971, 1972, 1973, 1974, 1975, 1978
- National Hurling League: 1975–76

Sporting positions
Preceded by	Kilkenny senior hurling team captain 1953	Succeeded by Dan Kennedy
Achievements
Preceded by Christy Ring	Railway Cup Final winning captain 1954	Succeeded by Christy Ring
