= Séamus Cleere =

Irish hurler (born 1940)

Personal information
- Native name: Séamus de Cléir (Irish)
- Born: 1940 (age 85–86) Bennettsbridge, County Kilkenny, Ireland
- Occupation: Company director
- Height: 6 ft 1 in (185 cm)

Sport
- Sport: Hurling
- Position: Right wing-back
Club
- Years: Club
- 1959–1969: Bennettsbridge
Club titles
- Kilkenny titles: 6
Inter-county*
| Years | County | Apps (scores) |
| 1960–1969 | Kilkenny | 22 (1-10) |
Inter-county titles
- Leinster titles: 5
- All-Irelands: 3
- NHL: 2
- *Inter County team apps and scores correct as of 13:56, 13 August 2020.

Séamus Cleere (born 1940) is an Irish retired hurler. His career included three All-Ireland Championship victories with the Kilkenny senior hurling team, including one as captain in 1963.

After beginning his career at club level with Bennettsbridge, Cleere joined the Kilkenny minor team as a 17-year-old in 1958 and subsequently had a brief stint with the junior side. He was promoted to the Kilkenny senior team in 1960. From his debut, Cleere was ever-present as a right wing-back and made 22 championship appearances in a career that ended with his last game in 1969. During that time he was part of three All-Ireland Championship-winning teams – in 1963, when he captained the side, 1967 and as a substitute in 1969. Cleere also secured five Leinster Championship medals and two National Hurling League medals. His club career yielded six Kilkenny County Championship titles during a golden age for Bennettsbridge.

== Playing career ==
=== Bennettsbridge ===
Cleere began his hurling career at club level with Bennettsbridge. After coming to prominence at juvenile and underage levels, he became a starting fifteen regular with the club's senior team during the 1959 Kilkenny County Championship. Cleere ended his first full season at senior level with a Kilkenny County Championship medal after a 4-06 to 1-04 win over Erin's Own in the final. He won a second successive championship title the following year after Bennettsbridge retained the title with a 4-05 to 3-04 win over Glenmore in the 1960 final.

After failing to secure a third successive title in 1961, Cleere made his third final appearance the following year. He ended the game with a third winners' medal after the 5-07 to 2-08 victory over Lisdowney. Bennettsbridge again failed to retain the title, however, Cleere added a fourth winners' medal to his collection after a 4-09 to 1-04 defeat of Glenmore in the 1964 final.

Mooncoin beat Bennettsbridge by a goal in the 1965 final, however, the club qualified foe a third successive decider in 1966. Cleere collected a fifth championship title after the 4-08 to 2-04 win over champions Mooncoin. He made his eighth final appearance in ten seasons in 1967 when Bennettsbridge faced Thoamstown. Cleere ended the game with a sixth winners' medal after the 3-10 to 1-04 win. His club career ended with a 3-09 to 3-07 defeat by Rower-Inistioge in the 1969 final.

=== Kilkenny ===
==== Minor and junior ====
Cleere first played for Kilkenny as a 17-year-old when he was drafted onto the minor team for the 1958 Leinster Championship. He won a Leinster Minor Championship medal as an unused substitute when Kilkenny beat Laois by 5-11 to 1-07 in the final.

After being overage for the minor team the following year, Cleere was called up to the Kilkenny junior team. He lined out in the half-forwards during Kilkenny's unsuccessful campaign in the 1959 Leinster Junior Championship.

==== Senior ====
Cleere's performances at club level drew the attention of the senior selectors and he was added to the Kilkenny senior team midway during the 1959-60 National League. He made his debut at right wing-back, with his brother Liam lining out in goal, on 3 April 1960 in a 4-07 to 2-07 win over Wexford. Cleere was retained on the starting fifteen for the 1960 Leinster Championship and was selected at centre-back when Kilkenny suffered a 3-10 to 2-11 defeat by Wexford in the 1960 Leinster final.

On 6 May 1962, Cleere contested his first national final when Kilkenny faced Cork in the final of the 1961-62 National League. He ended the game with a winners' medal following the 1-16 to 1-08 victory. He was subsequently denied a first Leinster Championship medal as Kilkenny suffered a 3-09 to 2-10 defeat by Wexford in the 1962 Leinster final.

Cleere was appointed captain of the team for the second time in his career in advance of the 1963 Leinster Championship. He claimed his first provincial winners' medal after making his third final appearance in the 2-10 to 0-09 defeat of Dublin in the 1963 Leinster final. On 1 September 1963, Cleere captained the team against Waterford in an All-Ireland final. Described in the Irish Independent as having a "superb game", he claimed his first All-Ireland medal and had the honour of lifting the Liam MacCarthy Cup after the 4-17 to 6-08 victory. Cleere ended the season by being named in the right wing-back position on the 1963 Gaelic Weekly Team of the Year, while he also became the first Kilkenny player to be named Hurler of the Year.

After collecting a second provincial title after the 4-11 to 1-08 defeat of Dublin in the 1964 Leinster final, Cleere lined out in a second consecutive All-Ireland final on 6 September 1964. In spite of being regarded as the favourites, Kilkenny ended the game as runners-up after a 5-13 to 2-08 defeat by Tipperary. Cleere ended the season by being named on the Gaelic Weekly Team of the Year for a second successive occasion.

On 23 May 1965, Cleere was at centre-back when Kilkenny suffered a 3-14 to 2-08 defeat by Tipperary in the home final of the 1964-65 National League. Kilkenny subsequently failed in their bid to secure the Leinster Championship for a third successive year, with Cleere missing the 1965 Leinster final defeat by Wexford through illness.

Cleere claimed the third provincial winners' medal after a 1-15 to 2-06 defeat of Wexford in the 1966 Leinster final. On 4 September 1966, he was again named at right wing-back when Kilkenny suffered a 3-09 to 1-10 defeat by Cork in the All-Ireland final. In spite of this defeat, Cleere ended the season with a second National League winners' medal after an aggregate victory of 10-15 to 2-15 over New York in the final. He was also named on the Gaelic Weekly Team of the Year for the third time in four seasons.

After failing to retain the National League title following a 3-10 to 1-09 defeat by Wexford in the 1966-67 final, Kilkenny later turned the tables on Wexford with Cleere claiming his fourth Leinster Championship winners' medal after a 4-10 to 1-12 victory in the 1967 Leinster final. On 3 September 1967, he claimed his second All-Ireland winners' medal after a 3-08 to 2-07 victory and a first All-Ireland final win over Tipperary in 45 years. Cleere ended the season by once again being named on the Gaelic Weekly Team of the Year.

On 12 May 1968, Cleere was in his customary position of right wing-back when Kilkenny were beaten 3-09 to 1-13 by Tipperary in the final of the 1967-68 National League. He also ended on the losing side in the 1968 Leinster final after a 3-13 to 4-09 defeat by Wexford.

Cleere retired from inter-county hurling after the Leinster final defeat in 1968, however, he was persuaded to rejoin the panel prior to the start of the 1969 Leinster Championship. He subsequently claimed his eighth provincial winners' medal as a non-playing substitute after the 3-09 to 0-16 defeat of Offaly in the final. On 7 September 1969, Cleere was again selected amongst the substitutes for the All-Ireland final against Cork. He remained on the bench for the entire game, but collected a third winners' medal following the 2-15 to 2-09 victory. Cleere retired fully from inter-county hurling at the end of the season.

=== Leinster ===
Cleere's performances for the Kilkenny senior team led to his inclusion on the Leinster team for the 1963 Railway Cup. His debut year with the provincial team ended in a 2-08 to 2-07 defeat in a final replay. Cleere quickly became an automatic selection on the Leinster team and won back-to-back winners' medals in 1964 and 1965 after back-to-back defeats of Munster. Three in-a-row proved beyond Leinster, however, he claimed his third and final winners' medal in 1967 after a 2-14 to 3-05 victory over Munster once again.

== Honours ==
Bennettsbridge

- Kilkenny Senior Hurling Championship (6): 1959, 1960, 1962, 1964, 1966, 1967

Kilkenny

- All-Ireland Senior Hurling Championship (3): 1963 (c), 1967, 1969
- Leinster Senior Hurling Championship (5): 1963 (c), 1964, 1966, 1967, 1969
- National Hurling League (2): 1961-62, 1965-66

Leinster

- Railway Cup (3): 1964, 1965, 1967

Awards

- Texaco Hurler of the Year (1): 1963
- Gaelic Weekly All-Stars (4): 1963, 1964, 1966, 1967

Sporting positions
| Preceded by Mickey Kelly | Kilkenny Senior Hurling Captain; 1961 | Succeeded by Alfie Hickey |
| Preceded by Alfie Hickey | Kilkenny Senior Hurling Captain; 1963 | Succeeded by Seán Buckley |
Achievements
| Preceded by Jimmy Doyle | All-Ireland Senior Hurling Final winning captain 1963 | Succeeded by Mick Murphy |
Awards
| Preceded by Donie Nealon | Texaco Hurler of the Year; 1963 | Succeeded by John Doyle |
