= Liam Cleere =

Irish hurler (born 1935)

Personal information
- Native name: Liam de Cléir (Irish)
- Born: 1935 (age 90–91) Bennettsbridge, County Kilkenny, Ireland
- Occupation: Carpenter
- Height: 5 ft 11 in (180 cm)

Sport
- Sport: Hurling
- Position: Goalkeeper
Clubs
- Years: Club
- Dicksboro; Bennettsbridge
Club titles
- Kilkenny titles: 7
Inter-county
- Years: County
- 1953-1965: Kilkenny
Inter-county titles
- Leinster titles: 3
- All-Irelands: 1
- NHL: 0

Liam Cleere (born 1935) is an Irish retired hurler. At club level he played with Dicksboro and Bennettsbridge and was an All-Ireland Championship winner with the Kilkenny senior hurling team.

== Honours ==
Bennettsbridge

- Kilkenny Senior Hurling Championship (7): 1953, 1955, 1956, 1959, 1960, 1962, 1964

Kilkenny

- All-Ireland Senior Hurling Championship (1): 1957
- Leinster Senior Hurling Championship (3): 1957, 1958, 1959
