= Jim Treacy =

Irish hurler (1943–2026)

Personal information
- Native name: Séamus Ó Treasaigh (Irish)
- Born: 1943 Bennettsbridge, County Kilkenny, Ireland
- Died: 28 May 2026 (aged 82) Waterford, Ireland
- Occupation: Mechanic
- Height: 5 ft 8 in (173 cm)

Sport
- Sport: Hurling
- Position: Left corner-back
Club
- Years: Club
- Bennettsbridge
Club titles
- Kilkenny titles: 5
Inter-county
Years	County	Apps (scores)
1963–1975	Kilkenny	30 (0-00)
Inter-county titles
- Leinster titles: 9
- All-Irelands: 6
- NHL: 1
- All Stars: 2

James Treacy (1943 – 28 May 2026) was an Irish hurler. At club level, he played with Bennettsbridge and at inter-county level with the Kilkenny senior hurling team.

== Early life ==
Born in Bennettsbridge, County Kilkenny, Treacy attended Kilkenny Vocational School where he played hurling as part of the school team. He won a Leinster Vocational Schools' SHC title in 1962, before being beaten by North Tipperary in the subsequent All-Ireland final.

== Club career ==
Treacy played his club hurling with Bennettsbridge at a time when the club was experiencing it's most successful era. He had just broken on to the club's senior team when he won his first Kilkenny SHC in 1962, having lined out as a non-playing substitute in the 5–07 to 2–08 win over Lisdowney in the final. Two years later in 1964, Treacy won a second Kilkenny SHC medal, his first on the field of play, after lining out at corner-back in the 4–09 to 1–04 defeat of Glenmore in the final. He was one of five Treacy brothers, including Martin, on the team that day.

Treacy was again at corner back when Bennettsbridge won consecutive Kilkenny SHC titles in 1966 and 1967, following wins over Mooncoin and Thomastown in the respective finals. He won a fifth and final Kilkenny SHC medal in November 1971, when he was again at corner-back in the 3–10 to 1–07 win over Fenians in the final.

== Inter-county career ==
Treacy first appeared on the inter-county scene for Kilkenny as a substitute on the senior team that beat Waterford by 4–17 to 6–08 in the 1963 All-Ireland SHC final. He claimed his first Leinster SHC medal the following year, however, he was once again a substitute when Kilkenny were beaten by Tipperary in the 1964 All-Ireland SHC final. Treacy was also included on Kilkenny's first ever under-21 team in 1964.

By 1966, Treacy had broken on to Kilkenny's starting fifteen. He won a second Leinster SHC medal before facing a 3–09 to 1–10 defeat by Cork in the 1966 All-Ireland SHC final. Bennettsbridge's club success in 1966 resulted in Treacy being appointed Kilkenny's team captain in 1967. He won a third Leinster SHC medal that year, before captaining Kilkenny to a 3–08 to 2–07 win over Tipperary in the 1967 All-Ireland SHC final.

Treacy later added a fourth Leinster SHC medal to his collection, before winning his third All-Ireland SHC medal after again lining out at corner-back in Kilkenny's 2–15 to 2–09 win over Cork in the 1969 All-Ireland SHC final. Two years later, he won the first of five consecutive Leinster SHC medal. Kilkenny subsequently lost the 1971 All-Ireland SHC final to Tipperary, however, Treacy ended the year by becoming Kilkenny's first ever All-Star recipient.

Treacy claimed his fourth All-Ireland SHC medal following Kilkenny's 3–24 to 5–11 win over Cork in the 1972 All-Ireland SHC final. He was once again honoured by being selected on the All-Star team. After missing out on the 1973 All-Ireland SHC final defeat by Limerick through injury, Kilkenny reclaimed the title the following year with a 3–19 to 1–13 defeat of Limerick and Treacy collected his fifth winners' medal. He was dropped from the starting fifteen a year later, however, he claimed a third All-Ireland SHC winners' medal in three seasons, and a sixth overall, after being listed amongst the substitutes in Kikenny's 2–22 to 2–10 defeat of Galway in the 1975 All-Ireland SHC final.

== Inter-provincial career ==
Treacy's performances at inter-county level with Kilkenny earned him selection to the Leinster inter-provincial team. He won his first Railway Cup medal in 1967, when he was listed amongst the substitutes for Leinster's 2–14 to 3–05 win over Munster in the final. Treacy subsequently broke onto the team and was at corner-back for Leinster's back-to-back wins over Munster in 1971 and 1972. He claimed a fourth winners' medal, again from the substitutes' bench, following Leinster's 1–13 to 2–08 win over Munster in the 1973 Railway Cup final.

== Death ==
Treacy died at University Hospital Waterford on 28 May 2026, at the age of 82.

== Honours ==
Kilkenny Vocational School

- Leinster Vocational Schools' Senior Hurling Championship (1): 1962

Bennettsbridge

- Kilkenny Senior Hurling Championship (5): 1962, 1964, 1966, 1967, 1971

Kilkenny

- All-Ireland Senior Hurling Championship (6): 1963, 1967 (c), 1969, 1972, 1974, 1975
- Leinster Senior Hurling Championship (9): 1964, 1966, 1967 (c), 1969, 1971, 1972, 1973, 1974, 1975
- National Hurling League (1): 1965–66
- Oireachtas Cup (3): 1966, 1967, 1969
- Walsh Cup (3): 1970, 1973, 1974

Leinster

- Railway Cup (4): 1967, 1971, 1972, 1973

Awards

- All Stars (2): 1971, 1972

Sporting positions
Preceded by Jim Lynch	Kilkenny senior hurling team captain 1967	Succeeded by Jim Bennett
Achievements
Preceded by Gerald McCarthy	All-Ireland SHC final winning captain 1967	Succeeded by Dan Quigley
