= 1968 Kilkenny Senior Hurling Championship =

Annual hurling competition season

- Dates: 9 June 1968 – 27 April 1969
- Teams: 15
- Champions: Rower-Inistioge (1st title); Michael Walsh (captain)
- Runners-up: Bennettsbridge; Jim Bennett (captain)

Tournament statistics
- Matches played: 15
- Goals scored: 74 (4.93 per match)
- Points scored: 248 (16.53 per match)
- Top scorer(s): Eddie Keher (3-21)

The 1968 Kilkenny Senior Hurling Championship was the 74th staging of the Kilkenny Senior Hurling Championship since its establishment by the Kilkenny County Board in 1887. The championship began on 9 June 1968 and ended on 27 April 1969.

Bennettsbridge were the defending champions.

On 27 April 1969, Rower-Inistioge won the championship after a 3–09 to 2–07 defeat of Bennettsbridge in the final at Nowlan Park. It was their first ever championship title. It remains their only championship triumph.

Rower-Inistioge's Eddie Keher was the championship's top scorer with 3-21.

== Team changes ==
=== To Championship ===
Promoted from the Kilkenny Junior Hurling Championship

- Coon

== Results ==
=== First round ===
9 June 1968 First round	Coon	2-09 - 3-10	Galmoy	Nowlan Park, Kilkenny
	N Morrissey 2-0, M Lalor 0-4, M Coonan 0-4, J Nolan 0-1.		W Harte 1-6, P Phelan 1-2, B Delaney 1-0, P Bowe 1-0, W Phelan 0-2.	Referee: P Johnston

9 June 1968 First round	Tullaroan	0-03 - 1-10	St. Lachtain's	Nowlan Park, Kilkenny
	B Fitzgerald 0-2, P Doheny 0-1.		S Buckley 0-7, T Dwan 1-0, P Butler 0-1, T Butler 0-1, J Cullinane 0-1.	Referee: P Buggy (Slieverue)

9 June 1968 First round	Thomastown	5-07 - 3-06	Young Irelands	Nowlan Park, Kilkenny
	S Kearney 2-1, V Kirby 1-4, M Walsh 1-0, T Hoyne 1-0, J Blanchfield 0-1, B O'Sullivan 0-1.		J Byrne 1-0, S Kelly 1-0, P Comerford 1-0, P Roche 0-2, J Brophy 0-1, A Comerford 0-1, J Carty 0-1, M Dwyer 0-1.	Referee: P Johnston

16 June 1968 First round	St. Senan's	0-11 - 4-07	Mooncoin	Piltown Sportsfield, Piltown
	S Cooke 0-3, T Gaule 0-3, P Sweeney 0-2, B Donovan 0-1, C Knox 0-1, T Hogan 0-1.		B O'Keeffe 2-0, C Dunne 1-3, J Dunphy 1-1, J Walsh 0-1, T Ryan 0-1, N Doyle 0-1.	Referee: J Murphy (Glenmore)

30 June 1968 First round	Erin's Own	3-09 - 4-06	Lisdowney	St. Patrick's Park, Ballyragget
	T Brennan 1-1, W Brennan 1-1, S Coogan 0-4, M Coogan 0-1, M Brennan 0-1, G Bryan 0-1.		D Blanchfield 3-2, T Carroll 1-0, M Carroll 0-2, M Mackey 0-1, M Fogarty 0-1.	Referee: R Behan (Urlingford)

30 June 1969 First round	Tullogher	0-05 - 2-11	James Stephens	Thomastown Sportsfield, Thomastown
	D Flynn 0-3, B Nolan 0-1, T Doolan 0-1.		S Brennan 1-3, M Taylor 1-2, M Dunne 0-4, N Morrissey 0-1, L Tyrrell 0-1.

30 June 1969 First round	Éire Óg	1-03 - 8-21	Rower-Inistioge	Thomastown Sportsfield, Thomastown
	J O'Leary 1-1, R Grace 0-1, T Dowling 0-1.		E Keher 2-10, P Murphy 2-4, M Kavanagh 2-3, J Murphy 1-2, P Kavanagh 1-2.

21 July 1968 First round replay	Erin's Own	2-12 - 4-11	Lisdowney	Nowlan Park, Kilkenny
	S Coogan 0-9, T Brennan 1-0, M Brennan 1-0, K Meally 0-2, M Boran 0-1.		D Blanchfield 0-8, J Dowling 2-0, M Holohan 1-0, C Fogarty 1-0, M Carroll 0-1, J Skehan 0-1, J Fogarty 0-1.

=== Second round ===
28 July 1968 Second round	St. Lachtain's	1-07 - 0-06	James Stephens	St. Patrick's Park, Ballyragget
	D Butler 1-1, S Buckley 0-3, E Morrissey 0-1, T Butler 0-1, T Dwan 0-1.		S Brennan 0-3, E Morrissey 0-1, M Dunne 0-1, P Dowling 0-1.	Referee: T Ryall (Graigue)

4 August 1968 Second round	Bennettsbridge	3-11 - 2-07	Galmoy	Nowlan Park, Kilkenny
	P Moran 2-7, J Bennett 1-0, M McCarthy 0-2, J Phelan 0-1, P Treacy 0-1.		L Harte 2-0, W Phelan 0-3, L Hanrahan 0-2, D Daly 0-1, B Harte 0-1.	Referee: J Murphy (Tullogher)

4 August 1968 Second round	Mooncoin	5-11 - 2-03	Lisdowney	Nowlan Park, Kilkenny
	C Dunne 2-5, N Doyle 1-2, T Ryan 1-1, D Holden 1-0, T Grant 0-2, M Conway 0-1.		D Blanchfield 1-1, J Dowling 1-0, J Fogarty 0-2.	Referee: P Johnston

30 March 1969 Second round	Rower-Inistioge	3-11 - 1-05	Thomastown	Nowlan Park, Kilkenny
	D White 1-5, M Walsh 1-0, T Murphy 1-0, E Keher 0-3, P Kavanagh 0-2.		T McMahon 1-0, B O'Sullivan 0-2, S Kearney 0-2, T Hoyne 0-1.	Referee: P Buggy (Slieverue)

=== Semi-finals ===
29 September 1968 Semi-final	Bennettsbridge	4-08 - 2-04	Mooncoin	Nowlan Park, Kilkenny
	P Moran 2-2, M McCarthy 1-2, P Treacy 1-0, S Carroll 0-2, N Ryan 0-1, P Lawlor 0-1.		C Dunne 1-1, D Kinsella 1-0, J Dunphy 0-1, N Doyle 0-1, M Conway 0-1.	Referee: J Murphy (Tullogher)

6 April 1969 Semi-final	Rower-Inistioge	2-08 - 1-10	St. Lachtain's	Nowlan Park, Kilkenny
	D White 2-0, E Keher 0-3, M Cahill 0-1, T Murphy 0-1, P Kavanagh 0-1, D Kavanagh 0-1, M Kavanagh 0-1.		J Cullinane 1-0, S Buckley 0-5, T Dwan 0-3, M Dawson 0-1, J Teehan 0-1.	Referee: T Ryall (Graigue)

=== Final ===
27 April 1969 Final	Rower-Inistioge	3-09 - 3-07	Bennettsbridge	Nowlan Park, Kilkenny
	E Keher 1-5, T Murphy 2-1, D Kavanagh 0-1, P Kavanagh 0-1, D White 0-1.		P Moran 1-2, N Ryan 1-1, J Bennett 1-0, J Kinsella 0-3, S Cleere 0-1.	Referee: J Murphy (Tullogher)

== Championship statistics ==
=== Top scorers ===
Top scorers overall

Rank	Player	Club	Tally	Total	Matches	Average
1	Eddie Keher	Rower-Inistioge	3-21	30	4	7.50
2	Paddy Moran	Bennettsbridge	5-11	26	3	8.66
3	Dick Blanchfield	Lisdowney	4-11	23	3	7.66
4	Claus Dunne	Mooncoin	4-09	21	3	7.00
5	Danny White	Rower-Inistioge	3-06	15	4	3.75
5	Seán Buckley	St. Lachtain's	0-15	15	3	5.00
6	Séamus Coogan	Rower-Inistioge	0-13	13	2	6.50
7	Tom Murphy	Rower-Inistioge	3-02	11	4	2.75
8	Pudsy Murphy	Rower-Inistioge	2-04	10	4	2.50
8	Martin Kavanagh	Rower-Inistioge	2-04	10	4	2.50

Top scorers in a single game

Rank	Player	Club	Tally	Total	Opposition
1	Eddie Keher	Rower-Inistioge	2-10	16	Éire Óg
2	Paddy Moran	Bennettsbridge	2-07	13	Galmoy
3	Dick Blanchfield	Lisdowney	3-02	11	Erin's Own
3	Claus Dunne	Mooncoin	2-05	11	Lisdowney
4	Pudsy Murphy	Rower-Inistioge	2-04	10	Éire Óg
5	Martin Kavanagh	Rower-Inistioge	2-03	9	Éire Óg
5	Billy Harte	Galmoy	1-06	9	Coon
5	Séamus Coogan	Erin's Own	0-09	9	Lidowney
6	Paddy Moran	Bennettsbridge	2-02	8	Mooncoin
6	Eddie Keher	Rower-Inistioge	1-05	8	Benenttsbridge
6	Danny White	Rower-Inistioge	1-05	8	Thomastown
6	Dick Blanchfield	Lisdowney	0-08	8	Erin's Own
