= Noel Skehan =

Kilkenny hurler

Personal information
- Native name: Nollaig Ó Sceacháin (Irish)
- Born: 6 December 1944 (age 81) Bennettsbridge, County Kilkenny, Ireland
- Occupation: Brewery supervisor
- Height: 5 ft 7 in (170 cm)

Sport
- Sport: Hurling
- Position: Goalkeeper
Club
- Years: Club
- 1963–1987: Bennettsbridge
Club titles
- Kilkenny titles: 4
Inter-county*
| Years | County | Apps (scores) |
| 1963–1985 | Kilkenny | 42 (0–00) |
Inter-county titles
- Leinster titles: 14
- All-Irelands: 9
- NHL: 3
- All Stars: 7
- *Inter County team apps and scores correct as of 14:13, 27 February 2022.

Richard Noel Skehan (born 6 December 1944) is an Irish former hurler who played as a goalkeeper at senior level for the Kilkenny county team.

Born in Bennettsbridge, County Kilkenny, Skehan first arrived on the inter-county scene at the age of sixteen when he first linked up with the Kilkenny minor team before later joining the under-21 side. He joined the senior panel during the 1963 championship. Skehan spent almost a decade as a substitute before becoming a regular member of the starting fifteen and won nine All-Ireland medals (three of which were as a substitute), fourteen Leinster medals (six as a substitute) and three National Hurling League medals on the field of play. He was an All-Ireland runner-up on five occasions.

As a member of the Leinster inter-provincial team on a number of occasions Skehan won four Railway Cup medals. At club level he is a six-time championship medallist with Bennettsbridge. Throughout his career Skehan made 42 championship appearances. He retired from inter-county hurling following the conclusion of the 1984-85 league.

In retirement from playing Skehan became involved in team management and coaching. After guiding the Kilkenny junior team to All-Ireland he also took charge of the intermediate side. As a selector under Brian Cody he guided the Kilkenny senior team to three All-Ireland titles.

Skehan is widely regarded as one of the greatest goalkeepers of all time. During his playing days he won seven All-Star awards as well as being named Texaco Hurler of the Year. He has often been voted onto teams made up of the sport's greats, including as goalkeeper on the Supreme All-Stars team. Skehan was also chosen as one of the 125 greatest hurlers of all time in a 2009 poll.

== Club career ==
Skehan played his club hurling with Bennettsbridge and joined the senior team in 1963. Beginning his career as an outfield player, he scored a goal from wing-forward when Bennettsbridge won the Kilkenny SHC title in 1964, following a 4–09 to 1–04 win over Glenmore. Skehan was again in the forwards when Bennettsbridge were beaten by Mooncoin in the 1965 Kilkenny SHC final.

By the time Bennettsbridge qualified to play Mooncoin in the 1966 Kilkenny SHC final, Skehan had become the team's first-choice goalkeeper. He claimed a second winners' medal after the 4–08 to 2–04 victory. The 1967 Kilkenny SHC final saw him make his fourth consecutive appearance in a final. Skehan ended the game with a third winners' medal as Thomastown were beaten by 3–10 to 1–04.

A defeat by Rower–Inistioge in a fifth straight final appearance in 1968 was followed by Skehan claiming a fourth and final winners' medal in 1971, following a 3–10 to 1–07 win over Fenians. Skehan had further finals appearances and defeats in 1972 and 1974. He continued to line out with Bennettsbridge, both as an outfield player and in goal, and ended his 25-year career with the club's junior team.

== Inter-county career ==
Skehan first appeared on the inter-county scene with Kilkenny as goalkeeper on the minor team in 1962. He won a Leinster MHC title that year, before later claiming an All-Ireland MHC medal following Kilkenny's 3–06 to 0–09 win over Tipperary in the final. Skehan immediately progressed to the intermediate team, while he was also in goal for Kilkenny's very first under-21 team in 1964.

By that stage, Skehan had also joined Kilkenny's senior team as understudy to his cousin and regular goalkeeper Ollie Walsh. It was a role he had for almost a decade, during which time he was part of the All-Ireland SHC-winning teams in 1963, 1967 and 1969. He later commented: "It was no hardship to sit on the bench because I knew I was a sub to the best goalkeeper in Ireland." Walsh's six-month suspension in 1968 resulted in Skehan making his Leinster SHC debut in a semi-final defeat of Offaly in June 1968.

Skehan replaced Walsh as first-choice goalkeeper in 1972, as well as serving as team captain for the year. He won the first of four consecutive Leinster SHC medals on the field of play, before later lining out in goal against Cork in the 1972 All-Ireland SHC final. The 3–24 to 5–11 win gave Skehan his first All-Ireland SHC medal on the field of play, while he also had the honour of accepting the Liam MacCarthy Cup on behalf of his team. He ended the year by winning the first of five consecutive All-Stars.

After losing the 1973 All-Ireland SHC final to Limerick, Kilkenny reclaimed the title the following year with a 3–19 to 1–13 defeat of Limerick. Skehan claimed a third All-Ireland SHC winners' medal in three seasons after once again lining out in goal in Kikenny's 2–22 to 2–10 defeat of Galway in the 1975 All-Ireland SHC final.

Skehan added a National Hurling League medal to his collection in 1976, however, Wexford ended Kilkenny's Leinster SHC campaigns in 1976 and 1977, before a defeat to Cork in the 1978 All-Ireland SHC final. He won his fourth All-Ireland SHC medal of the decade after Kilkenny's 2–12 to 1–08 win over Galway in the 1979 All-Ireland SHC final.

After claiming his second National League title in 1982, Skehan won a seventh Leinster SHC medal on the field of play, after a 1–11 to 0–12 win over Offaly. Kilkenny subsequently beat Cork by 3–18 to 1–13 in the 1982 All-Ireland SHC final. It was a fifth All-Ireland SHC winners' medal on the field of play for Skehan and, combined with the three medals he also won as a substitute, he joined Christy Ring and John Doyle as the holder of a record eight All-Ireland SHC medals. He ended the season by winning a sixth All-Star, as well as being named Hurler of the Year. Kilkenny retained their National League and Leinster SHC titles the following year, while the 2–14 to 2–12 win over Cork in the 1983 All-Ireland SHC final gave Skehan a record-breaking ninth All-Ireland SHC medal in total - 20 years after winning his first. He also became the oldest hurler to win an All-Star, after claiming a then record seventh award.

Skehan retired from inter-county hurling in April 1985.

== Inter-provincial career ==
Skehan's performances at inter-county level with Kilkenny earned him selection to the Leinster inter-provincial team. He first played for the province in 1973 and ended his debut year with his first Railway Cup medal, following a 1–13 to 2–08 win over Munster. It was the first of three successive winners' medals, as Leinster had further victories over Munster in 1974 and 1975. Skehan remained as Leinster's first-choice goalkeeper for much of his 11-year association with the provincial team. He won a fourth and final Railway Cup medal in 1979, but continued to be selected for the team until 1985.

== Management career ==
Skehan first became involved in inter-county management when he succeeded Ollie Walsh as coach–trainer of Kilkenny's junior team in 1991. He guided the team to five Leinster JHC titles in six seasons between 1991 and 1996. Skehan's team had All-Ireland JHC final defeats in 1993, 1994 and 1996, however, Kilkenny beat Clare by 1–20 to 1–06 in the 1995 All-Ireland JHC final.

Following a restructuring of the All-Ireland JHC, Skehan took over as coach of Kilkenny's intermediate team in 1997. He guided the team to four consecutive Leinster IHC titles between 1997 and 2000, as well as consecutive All-Ireland IHC final defeats in 1997 and 1998.

Skehan replaced Ger Henderson as a selector with the Kilkenny senior team under manager Brian Cody in November 2001. His three years in that role saw Kilkenny win consecutive National League and Leinster SHC titles in 2002 and 2003. Skehan also served as manager of the Leinster team that won consecutive Railway Cup titles in 2002 and 2003.

== Personal life ==
Skehan was born in Bennettsbridge, County Kilkenny in December 1944. His uncle, Dan Kennedy, captained Kilkenny to the All-Ireland SHC title in 1947. A cousin, Ollie Walsh, preceded Skehan as Kilkenny goalkeeper, while another cousin, Michael Walsh, succeeded him in goal. Skehan joined the Smithwick's brewery in Kilkenny as a trainee mechanic, before later beoming transport supervisor.

== Honours ==
=== Player ===
Bennettsbridge

- Kilkenny Senior Hurling Championship (4): 1964, 1966, 1967, 1971

Kilkenny

- All-Ireland Senior Hurling Championship (9): 1963, 1967, 1969, 1972, 1974, 1975, 1979, 1982, 1983
- Leinster Senior Hurling Championship (14): 1963, 1964, 1966, 1967, 1969, 1971, 1972, 1973, 1974, 1975, 1978, 1979, 1982, 1983
- National Hurling League (3): 1975-76, 1981-82, 1982-83
- Oireachtas Tournament (1): 1966, 1967, 1969, 1984
- All-Ireland Minor Hurling Championship (1): 1962
- Leinster Minor Hurling Championship (1): 1962

Leinster

- Railway Cup (4): 1973, 1974, 1975, 1979

=== Management ===
Kilkenny

- All-Ireland Senior Hurling Championship (2): 2002, 2003
- Leinster Senior Hurling Championship (2): 2002, 2003
- National Hurling League (2): 2002, 2003
- Leinster Intermediate Hurling Championship (4): 1997, 1998, 1999, 2000
- All-Ireland Junior Hurling Championship (1): 1995
- Leinster Junior Hurling Championship (5): 1991, 1993, 1994, 1995, 1996
- Leinster Vocational Schools Senior Hurling Championship (1): 1997

=== Individual ===
Honours

- The 125 greatest stars of the GAA: No. 16
- Supreme All-Stars Team: Goalkeeper
- Texaco Hurler of the Year (1): 1982
- All-Star (7): 1972, 1973, 1974, 1975, 1976, 1982, 1983
- GAA Hall of Fame Inductee: 2013
- In May 2020, the Irish Independent named Skehan at number fifteen in its "Top 20 hurlers in Ireland over the past 50 years". He was the only goalkeeper included.

Sporting positions
| Preceded by Pat Henderson | Kilkenny Senior Hurling Captain; 1972 | Succeeded by Pat Delaney |
| Preceded by Ollie Walsh | Kilkenny Junior Hurling Manager; 1991-1996 | Succeeded by Position abolished |
Achievements
| Preceded by Tadhg O'Connor (Tipperary) | All-Ireland SHC winning captain 1972 | Succeeded by Éamonn Grimes (Limerick) |
Awards
| Preceded by Pat Delaney (Offaly) | Texaco Hurler of the Year; 1982 | Succeeded by Frank Cummins (Kilkenny) |
