= 1965 Kilkenny Senior Hurling Championship =

Annual hurling competition season

- Dates: 4 July - 29 August 1965
- Teams: 14
- Champions: Mooncoin (12th title); Joe Dunphy (captain)
- Runners-up: Bennettsbridge

Tournament statistics
- Matches played: 14
- Goals scored: 64 (4.57 per match)
- Points scored: 210 (15 per match)
- Top scorer(s): Ollie Walsh (10-04)

The 1965 Kilkenny Senior Hurling Championship was the 71st staging of the Kilkenny Senior Hurling Championship since its establishment by the Kilkenny County Board. The championship ran from 4 July to 29 August 1965.

Bennettsbridge entered the championship as the defending champions.

The final was played on 29 August 1965 at Nowlan Park in Kilkenny, between Mooncoin and Bennettsbridge, in what was their first meeting in the final in 10 years. Mooncoin won the match by 2–08 to 1–08 to claim their 12th championship title overall and a first title in 29 years. It remains their last championship triumph.

Thomastown's Ollie Walsh was the championship's top scorer with 10–04.

== Team changes ==
=== To Championship ===
Promoted from the Kilkenny Junior Hurling Championship

- Young Irelands

=== From Championship ===
Regraded to the Kilkenny Junior Hurling Championship

- John Locke's

== Results ==
=== First round ===
4 July 1965 First round	Glenmore	1-08 - 1-05	Tullogher	Mullinavat Grounds
	P Fitzgerald 1-2, M Cass 0-3, M Cody 0-1, P Power 0-1, M Whelan 0-1.		J Murphy 1-0, T Doolan 0-2, B O’Neill 0-1, P Walsh 0-1, P Murphy 0-1.	Referee: P Buggy (Slieverue)

4 July 1965 First round	St. Lachtain's	2-12 - 1-10	Lisdowney	Nowlan Park
	S Buckley 0-7, P Lacey 1-1, J Dooley 1-0, J Teehan 0-2, S Rafferty 0-1, D Butler 0-1.		M Fogarty 0-4, M Ryan 1-0, B White 0-3, M Carroll 0-3.	Referee: T Ryall (Graigue)

4 July 1965 First round	St. Senan's	5-06 - 1-05	Young Irelands	Nowlan Park
	P Hoban 2-0, N Williams 1-1, J Walsh 1-1, N O’Neill 1-0, S Cooke 0-3, C Knox 0-1.		A Comerford 0-5, J McCarthy 1-0.

4 July 1965 First round	Thomastown	7-16 - 0-08	Slieverue	Mullinavat Grounds
	O Walsh 6-2, T. Walsh 0-9, V Kirby 0-2, J Blanchfield 0-1, J Delaney 0-1, J Kelly 0-1.		P Atkins 0-2, P Walsh 0-2, G Donavan 0-1, N Power, M Murphy 0-1, W Murphy 0-1.	Referee: J Sutton (Glenmore)

4 July 1965 First round	Mooncoin	2-00 - 0-05 (match abandoned)	Tullaroan	Nowlan Park

4 July 1965 First round	Rower-Inistioge	6-10 - 4-05	James Stephens	Thomastown Grounds
	E Keher 1-4, T Murphy 1-2, D White 1-1, B Murphy 1-0, P Kavanagh 0-2, P Freeney 0-1.		S Delaney 2-0, P Dowling 1-0, D Brennan 1-0, S Leahy 0-2, J Ayers 0-2, M Leahy 0-1.	Referee: J Brennan (Young Irelands)

11 July 1965 First round	Bennettsbridge	3-06 - 1-08	Erin's Own	Nowlan Park
	T Kelly 1-3, L Cleere 1-1, M McCarthy 1-0, P Moran 0-1, J Bennett 0-1.		S Coogan 1-4, N Holland 0-2, M Coogan 0-1, P Dowd 0-1.

18 July 1965 First round replay	Mooncoin	2-07 - 0-02	Tullaroan	Nowlan Park
	J Dunphy 2-4, N Doyle 0-2, B O’Keeffe 0-1.		B Fitzgerald 0-1, J Clohosey 0-1.

- Éire Óg received a bye in this round.

=== Second round ===
18 July 1965 Second round	St. Lachtain's	2-08 - 2-05	Rower-Inistioge	Nowlan Park
	S Buckley 0-7, J Cullinane 1-0, M Dalton 1-0, J Manogue 0-1.		T Murphy 2-0, E Keher 0-5.

18 July 1965 Second round	Bennettsbridge	6-10 - 2-05	Éire Óg	Nowlan Park
	N Skehan 2-1, P Treacy 2-0, T Kelly 1-2, S Carroll 0-5, P Moran 1-0, J Bennett 0-1.		T O’Connell 1-2, S. O’ Brien 1-0, P Nolan 0-2, O Harrington 0-1, PJ Garvan 0-1.	Referee: T Ryall (Graig)

18 July 1965 Second round	Thomastown	3-05 - 1-04	Glenmore	Piltown Grounds
	O Walsh 3-1, T Walsh 0-2, S Delaney 0-1, V Kirby 0-1.		P Fitzgerald 1-2, R Dowling 0-2.	Referee: P Buggy (Slieverue)

25 July 1965 Second round	Mooncoin	4-13 - 1-04	St. Senan's	Piltown Grounds
	J Dunphy 2-3, C Dunne 0-7, T Walsh 2-0, M Conway 0-1, N Doyle 0-1, J Howley 0-1.		P Hoban 1-1, S Cooke 0-3, J Walsh 0-1.

=== Semi-finals ===
8 August 1965 Semi-final	Bennettsbridge	2-11 - 1-14	Thomastown	Nowlan Park
	T Kelly 1-6, P. Treacy 1-0, P Moran 0-3, N Skehan 0-1, J Kinsella 0-1		O Walsh 1-1, B O’Sullivan 0-2, P Cushen 0-1.	Referee: J Sutton (Glenmore)

8 August 1965 Semi-final	Mooncoin	2-11 - 1-06	St. Lachtain's	Nowlan Park
	C Dunne 0-5, M Conway 0-3, T Walsh 1-0, B O Keeffe 1-0, N Doyle 0-2, J Dunphy 0-1.		S Buckley 0-4, P Lacey, D Butler, J Cullinane 0-1.	Referee: J Brennan (Young Irelands)

=== Final ===
29 August 1965 Final	Mooncoin	2-08 - 1-08	Bennettsbridge	Nowlan Park
	C Dunne 0-6, J Dunphy 1-1, T Walsh 1-0, M Conway 0-1.		T Kelly 1-2, P Moran 0-5, J Bennett 0-1.	Referee: P Johnston

== Championship statistics ==
=== Top scorers ===
Top scorers overall

Rank	Player	County	Tally	Total	Matches	Average
1	Ollie Walsh	Thomastown	10-04	34	3	11.33
2	Tony Kelly	Bennettsbridge	4-13	25	4	6.25
3	Joe Dunphy	Mooncoin	5-09	23	4	6.00
4	Seán Buckley	St. Lachtain's	0-18	18	3	6.00
4	Claus Dunne	Mooncoin	0-18	18	4	4.50
6	Tom Walsh	Mooncoin	4-00	12	4	3.00
6	Eddie Keher	Rower-Inistioge	1-09	12	2	6.00
6	Paddy Moran	Bennettsbridge	1-09	12	4	3.00
9	Tommy Murphy	Rower-Inistioge	3-02	11	2	5.50
9	Tom Walsh	Thomastown	0-11	11	3	3.66

In a single game

Rank	Player	Club	Tally	Total	Opposition
1	Ollie Walsh	Thomastown	6-02	18	Slieverue
2	Ollie Walsh	Thomastown	3-01	10	Glenmore
2	Joe Dunphy	Mooncoin	2-04	10	Tullaroan
4	Joe Dunphy	Mooncoin	2-03	9	St. Senan's
4	Tony Kelly	Bennettsbridge	1-06	9	Thomastown
4	Tom Walsh	Thomastown	0-09	9	Slieverue
7	Noel Skehan	Bennettsbridge	2-01	7	Éire Óg
7	Eddie Keher	Rower-Inistioge	1-04	7	James Stephens
7	Séamie Coogan	Erin's Own	1-04	7	Bennettsbridge
7	Seán Buckley	St. Lachtain's	0-07	7	Lisdowney
7	Seán Buckley	St. Lachtain's	0-07	7	Rower-Inistioge
7	Claus Dunne	Mooncoin	0-07	7	St. Senan's
