= Dan Kennedy (hurler, born 1925) =

Irish hurler (1925–1977)

Personal information
- Native name: Dónall Ó Cinnéide (Irish)
- Born: 11 January 1925 Thomastown, County Kilkenny, Ireland
- Died: 6 February 1977 (aged 52) Wexford, Ireland
- Occupation: Sales manager
- Height: 5 ft 11 in (180 cm)

Sport
- Sport: Hurling
- Position: Midfield
Clubs
- Years: Club
- Thomastown; Dicksboro; Bennettsbridge
Club titles
- Kilkenny titles: 6
Inter-county
- Years: County
- 1945–1954: Kilkenny
Inter-county titles
- Leinster titles: 5
- All-Irelands: 1
- NHL: 0

Daniel Kennedy (11 January 1925 – 6 February 1977) was an Irish hurler. At club level, he played with Thomastown, Dicksboro and Bennettsbridge and at inter-county level was a member of the Kilkenny senior hurling team from 1945 to 1954. Kennedy captained Kilkenny to the All-Ireland SHC title in 1947.

== Club career ==
Kennedy first played hurling as part of the Thomastown team that won the Kilkenny JHC title in 1945, following a 4–05 to 5–00 win over St Rioch's in the final. This win resulted in promotion to the top tier of Kilkenny hurling. Kennedy was team captain when Thomastown claimed their maiden Kilkenny SHC title in 1946, however, an ankle injury resulted in him leaving the field of play in the 5–04 to 4–05 defeat of Carrickshock.

By 1950, Kennedy had moved to the Dicksboro club. He won a seocond Kilkenny SHC medal that year, following Dicksboro's win over Éire Óg in a final replay. Kennedy once again moved clubs and, by 1952, was playing with Bennettsbridge. That year, he claimed a third Kilkenny SHC medal, after lining out in the 5–03 to 4–05 win over Tullaroan It was the first of four title victories in five years for Bennettsbridge, with Kennedy ending his career with six Kilkenny SHC medals.

== Inter-county career ==
Kennedy first appeared for Kilkenny as a member of the senior team in 1945. He won his first Leinster SHC medal that year, after lining out at midfield in the 5–12 to 3–04 win over Dublin. He lined out in the same position when Kilkenny were beaten by Tipperary in the 1945 All-Ireland SHC final. Kennedy claimed a second Leinster SHC medal after Kilkenny retained the provincial title in 1946. He was again at midfield when Kilkenny lost the 1946 All-Ireland SHC final to Cork.

Thomastown's club success resulted in Kennedy assuming the Kilkenny captaincy in 1947. He collected a third successive Leinster SHC medal, following Kilkenny's 7–10 to 3–06 win over Dublin. Kennedy subsequently captained Kilkenny to their first All-Ireland SHC in eight years, and his sole winners' medal, after a one–point win over Cork in the 1947 All-Ireland SHC final.

Four successive provincial titles proved beyond Kilkenny, however, Kennedy claimed his fourth Leinster SHC medal in 1950, after a 3–11 to 2–11 defeat of Wexford. He partnered Shem Downey at midfield in the 1950 All-Ireland SHC final defeat by Tipperary. Kennedy collected a fifth and final Leinster SHC medal in 1953, before retiring from inter-county hurling the following year.

== Inter-provincial career ==
Kennedy's performances with Kilkenny resulted in his selection for the Leinster inter-provincial team. He was at midfield for Leinster's 4–09 to 3–06 defeat by Munster in the 1951 Railway Cup final.

== Personal life and death ==
Kennedy was born in Thomastown, County Kilkenny. He spent his entire working life with Messrs Mosse's mills in Bennettsbridge and eventually became sales manager with Messrs Mosse/Davis Ltd. Kennedy married Alice Reid in 1948. They had eight children.

On 6 February 1977, Kennedy became suddenly ill while playing golf in Rosslare, County Wexford. He died a short time later at Wexford General Hospital, at the age of 52.

== Honours ==
Thomastown

- Kilkenny Senior Hurling Championship: 1946 (c)
- Kilkenny Junior Hurling Championship: 1945

Dickboro

- Kilkenny Senior Hurling Championship: 1950

Bennettsbridge

- Kilkenny Senior Hurling Championship: 1952, 1953, 1955, 1956

Kilkenny

- All-Ireland Senior Hurling Championship: 1947 (c)
- Leinster Senior Hurling Championship: 1945, 1946, 1947 (c), 1950, 1953

Sporting positions
Preceded by Jack Mulcahy	Kilkenny senior hurling team captain 1947	Succeeded by
Achievements
Preceded by Christy Ring	All-Ireland SHC final winning captain 1947	Succeeded by Jim Ware
