= Alfie Hickey =

Irish hurler (1933–2000)

Personal information
- Born: 1933 Ballylarkin, County Kilkenny, Ireland
- Died: 12 April 2000 (aged 66) Athy, County Kildare, Ireland
- Occupation: Labourer

Sport
- Sport: Hurling
- Position: Centre-back
Club
- Years: Club
- St Lachtain's
Club titles
- Kilkenny titles: 2
Inter-county
- Years: County
- 1961-1963: Kilkenny
Inter-county titles
- Leinster titles: 1
- All-Irelands: 1
- NHL: 1

Alphonsus Hickey (1933 – 12 April 2000) was an Irish hurler. At club level he played with St. Lachtain's, and also lined out at inter-county level with the Kilkenny senior hurling team.

== Career ==
Hickey first played hurling at club level with the St Lachtain's club in Freshford. He was part of the St Lachtain's team that won the Kilkenny JHC title in 1959. Hickey later captained St Lachtain's to their very first Kilkenny SHC title after a defeat of the Near South in 1961. He claimed a second Kilkenny SHC medal in 1963.

Hickey's performances at cub level resulted in him assuming the captaincy of the Kilkenny senior hurling team. He won a National Hurling League medal in this role after a defeat of Cork in the 1962 final. Hickey lost his place on the starting fifteen the following year but was an unused substitute when Kilkenny beat Waterford in the 1963 All-Ireland final.

== Personal life and death ==
Hickey's hurling career ended shortly after the All-Ireland final victory. He spent a number of years working in England before returning to Freshford in 1994. Hickey's health declined after his return and he died at St. Vincent's Hospital in Athy on 12 April 2000, at the age of 66.

== Honours ==
St Lachtain's

- Kilkenny Senior Hurling Championship: 1961 (c), 1963
- Kilkenny Junior Hurling Championship: 1959

Kilkenny

- All-Ireland Senior Hurling Championship: 1963
- Leinster Senior Hurling Championship: 1963
- National Hurling League: 1961-62 (c)

Sporting positions
Preceded by Séamus Cleere	Kilkenny Senior Hurling Captain; 1962	Succeeded by Séamus Cleere
