= Martin Treacy =

Irish hurler

Personal information
- Native name: Máirtín Ó Treasaigh (Irish)
- Born: 1936 Bennettsbridge, County Kilkenny, Ireland
- Died: 4 June 2014 (aged 77–78) Kilkenny, Ireland
- Height: 5 ft 8 in (173 cm)

Sport
- Sport: Hurling
- Position: Left corner-back
Club
- Years: Club
- Bennettsbridge
Club titles
- Kilkenny titles: 6
Inter-county
Years	County	Apps (scores)
1959-1963	Kilkenny	4 (0-00)
Inter-county titles
- Leinster titles: 2
- All-Irelands: 1
- NHL: 0

Martin Treacy (1936 – 4 June 2014) was an Irish hurler who played as a left corner-back for the Kilkenny senior team.

Born in Bennettsbridge, County Kilkenny, Treacy first arrived on the inter-county scene at the age of twenty-three when he made his senior debut in the 1959 championship. Treacy went on to play a semi-regular part for Kilkenny over the next few years, and won one All-Ireland medal and two Leinster medals.

At club level Treacy played with Bennesttsbridge, winning six championship medals.

His younger brother, Jim Treacy, also hurled with Kilkenny and captained the team to the All-Ireland title in 1967.

In retirement from playing Treacy became involved in administrative affairs and served with the Bennettsbridge club and the Kilkenny County Board.

== Playing career ==
=== Club ===
Treacy played with Bennettsbridge during a golden age for the club. He won his first championship medal in 1959 following a 4-6 to 1-4 defeat of Erin's Own. Treacy won a second consecutive medal in 1960 as Bennettsbridge accounted for Glenmore by 4-5 to 3-4.

Three-in-a-row proved beyond Bennettsbridge, however, the club reached the decider again in 1962. A 5-7 to 2-8 defeat of Lisdowny gave Treacy a third championship medal.

Bennettsbridge surrendered their championship crown again the following year, however, a 4-9 to 1-4 trouncing of Glenmore in 1964 gave Treacy a fourth championship medal.

Mooncoin wrested the title from "the Bridge" in 1965, however, Treacy won his fifth and sixth championship medals following victories over Mooncoin and Thomastown over the following two years.

=== Inter-county ===
Treacy made his senior championship debut on 12 July 1959 in a 2-9 to 1-11 provincial final defeat of Dublin. It was his first Leinster medal. Treacy was later dropped from the starting fifteen for Kilkenny's All-Ireland final meeting with Waterford on 6 September 1959. That came ended in a 1-17 to 5-5 draw. Treacy was also an unused substitute for the subsequent replay, which Waterford won by 3-12 to 1-10 win.

After surrendering their provincial crown for the next two years, Treacy won a second Leinster medal in 1963 following a 2-10 to 0-9 defeat of Dublin. This victory allowed Kilkenny to advance directly into an All-Ireland showdown with Waterford on 1 September 1963. "The Cats" entered the game as underdogs, however, star forward Eddie Keher proved to be the difference with a magnificent display in which he scored fourteen points. Despite a hat-trick of goals from Waterford's Séamus Power, Kilkenny secured a 4-17 to 6-8 victory. It was Treacy's first All-Ireland medal while it also proved to be his last championship outing for Kilkenny.

== Honours ==
=== Team ===
Bennettsbridge

- Kilkenny Senior Hurling Championship (6): 1959, 1960, 1962, 1964, 1966, 1967

Kilkenny

- All-Ireland Senior Hurling Championship (1): 1963
- Leinster Senior Hurling Championship (2): 1959, 1963
