= 1963 Kilkenny Senior Hurling Championship =

Annual hurling competition season

- Champions: St. Lachtain's (2nd title); Pa Dillon (captain)
- Runners-up: Tullogher

The 1963 Kilkenny Senior Hurling Championship was the 69th staging of the Kilkenny Senior Hurling Championship since its establishment by the Kilkenny County Board in 1887.

Bennettsbridge were the defending champions, however, they were beaten by St Lachtain's in the semi-finals.

The final was played on 27 October 1963 at Nowlan Park in Kilkenny, between St Lachtain's and first-time finalists Tullogher. St Lachtain's won the match by 1–07 to 0–03 to claim their second championship title overall and a first title in two years.

== Results ==
=== Semi-finals ===
| 17 August 1963 Semi-final | Tullogher | 3-13 - 2-04 | Lisdowney | Nowlan Park |

| 28 September 1963 Semi-final | St Lachtain's | 5-02 - 3-07 | Bennettsbridge | Nowlan Park |

=== Final ===
| 27 October 1963 Final | St Lachtain's | 1-07 - 0-03 | Tullogher | Nowlan Park |
| | S Buckley 0-5, S Rafferty 1-0, P Lacey 0-1, D Butler 0-1. | | P Murphy 0-3. | Referee: R McEntee (Thomastown) |
