= Jim Bennett (hurler) =

Irish hurler (1944–2014)

Personal information
- Native name: Séamus Mac Beinéid (Irish)
- Born: 1944 Bennettsbridge, County Kilkenny, Ireland
- Died: 31 December 2014 (aged 70) Edenmore, County Dublin, Ireland
- Occupation: Plasterer
- Height: 6 ft 0 in (183 cm)

Sport
- Sport: Hurling
- Position: Right corner-forward
Clubs
- Years: Club
- Bennettsbridge; St Monica's
Club titles
- Kilkenny titles: 2
Inter-county
| Years | County | Apps (scores) |
| 1966–1968 | Kilkenny | 5 (1–1) |
Inter-county titles
- Leinster titles: 1
- All-Irelands: 1
- NHL: 1

James Bennett (1944 – 31 December 2014) was an Irish hurler who played as a right corner-forward for the Kilkenny senior team.

Born in Bennettsbridge, County Kilkenny, Bennett first arrived on the inter-county scene at the age of twenty-one when he first linked up with the Kilkenny senior team. He made his senior debut during the 1965 championship. Bennett subsequently became a regular member of the starting fifteen and won one All-Ireland medal, one Leinster medal and one National Hurling League medal. He was an All-Ireland runner-up on one occasion.

As a member of the Leinster inter-provincial team on a number of occasions Bennett won one Railway Cup medal. At club level he was a two-time championship medallist with Bennettsbridge. He later played with St Monica's in Dublin.

His son, Greg Bennett, played hurling with Dublin.

Throughout his career Bennett made 5 championship appearances. He retired from inter-county hurling following the conclusion of the 1968 championship.

== Playing career ==
=== Club ===
Bennett lined out with Bennettsbridge in his first championship decider in 1965, however, Mooncoin triumphed on that occasion. In spite of this both sides renewed their rivalry in the 1966 decider. A double scores 4–8 to 2–4 victory avenged the previous year's defeat and gave Bennett a first championship medal.

Bennettsbridge continued to dominate club hurling once again in 1967. A 3–10 to 1–4 defeat of Thomastown earned a second championship medal for Bennett.

=== Inter-county ===
Bennett made his senior championship debut on 27 June 1965 in a 1–20 to 3–8 Leinster semi-final defeat of Dublin.

After surrendering their provincial crown in 1965, Kilkenny bounced back the following year by reaching the final of the National Hurling League. An aggregate 10–15 to 2–15 defeat of New York gave Bennett a league medal. He was later confined to the substitutes' bench as Kilkenny went on to claim the Leinster title before losing the All-Ireland final to Cork. There was some consolation before the end of the year, with Bennett winning an Oireachtas medal following a 4–7 to 1–7 victory over Wexford.

Bennett was added to the starting fifteen in 1967 and collected a Leinster medal on the field of play as Kilkenny retained their provincial crown following a 4–10 to 1–12 defeat of Wexford after a scare in the opening half. On 3 September 1967 Kilkenny faced Tipperary in the All-Ireland decider. Tipperary looked like continuing their hoodoo over their near rivals as they took a 2–6 to 1–3 lead at half-time. Goalkeeper Ollie Walsh was the hero for Kilkenny as he made a series of spectacular saves, however, the team lost Eddie Keher and Tom Walsh to injury in the second half. In spite of this, Kilkenny laid to rest a bogey that Tipperary had over the team since 1922, and a 3–8 to 2–7 victory gave Bennett an All-Ireland medal. He finished off the year by claiming a second successive Oireachtas medal following a 4–4 to 1–8 defeat of Clare.

As captain of the team in 1968, Bennett's side exited the championship at the hands of Wexford in the Leinster decider.

=== Inter-provincial ===
In 1967 Bennett was at full-forward on the Leinster inter-provincial team. He won a Railway Cup medal that year following Leinster's 2–14 to 3–5 defeat of Munster.

== Honours ==
=== Player ===
Bennettsbridge

- Kilkenny Senior Hurling Championship (2): 1966, 1967

Kilkenny

- All-Ireland Senior Hurling Championship (1): 1967
- Leinster Senior Hurling Championship (2): 1966 (sub), 1967
- National Hurling League (1): 1965–66
- Oireachtas Tournament (2): 1966, 1967

Leinster

- Railway Cup (1): 1967

Sporting positions
| Preceded by Jim Treacy | Kilkenny Senior Hurling Captain; 1968 | Succeeded by Eddie Keher |
