= 1966 Kilkenny Senior Hurling Championship =

Annual hurling competition season

- Dates: 24 July 1966 – 9 October 1966
- Teams: 15
- Champions: Bennettsbridge (10th title)
- Runners-up: Mooncoin

Tournament statistics
- Matches played: 14
- Goals scored: 82 (5.86 per match)
- Points scored: 229 (16.36 per match)
- Top scorer: Claus Dunne (3-27)

The 1966 Kilkenny Senior Hurling Championship was the 72nd staging of the Kilkenny Senior Hurling Championship since its establishment by the Kilkenny County Board. The championship began on 24 July 1966 and ended on 9 October 1966.

Mooncoin were the defending champions.

On 9 October 1966, Bennettsbridge won the championship after a 4–08 to 2–04 defeat of Mooncoin in the final. It was their 10th championship title overall and their first title in two championship seasons.

Mooncoin's Claus Dunne was the championship's top scorer with 3-27.

== Team changes ==
=== To Championship ===
Promoted from the Kilkenny Junior Hurling Championship

- Knocktopher

== Results ==
=== First round ===
24 July 1966 First round	James Stephens	4-09 - 1-07	Tullogher	Nowlan Park
	J McCarthy 0-5, S Leahy 1-1, P Dowling 1-0, J Connors 1-0, M Dunne 1-0.

24 July 1966 First round	Éire Óg	5-05 - 1-04	St. Lachtain's	Nowlan Park
	R Grace 3-0, T O'Connell 1-5, N Nolan 1-0.		S Buckley 1-2, P Butler 0-2.

24 July 1966 First round	Bennettsbridge	11-07 - 2-04	Young Irelands	Nowlan Park
	N Skehan 3-2, J Bennett 2-1, L Cleere 2-1, P Treacy 2-0, N Ryan 1-0, S Treacy 0-1, P Moran 0-1, S Cleere 0-1.		P Comerford 1-0, J Byrne 1-0, B Phelan 0-2, L Dwyer 0-1, J McCarthy 0-1.

24 July 1966 First round	Knocktopher	4-06 - 4-04	St. Senan's	Mullinavat Sportsfield
	F Aylward 1-4, P Carroll 1-1, S Ryan 1-0, D Heaslip 1-0, J Fowler 0-1.		S Fleming 1-1, E Knox 1-0, S Sutton 1-0, H Matthews 1-0, F Walsh 0-2, S Cooke 0-1.

31 July 1966 First round	Glenmore	1-15 - 1-04	Tullaroan	Nowlan Park
	M Cass 0-7, P Fitzgerald 0-4, J Doherty 1-0, M Phelan 0-2, P Dowling 0-1, J Dowling 0-1.		B Hennessy 1-0, B Fitzgerald 0-2, M Dalton 0-1, E Doherty 0-1.

31 July 1966 First round	Rower-Inistioge	2-10 - 1-02	Thomastown	Nowlan Park
	T Murphy 1-3, P Freaney 1-3, E Keher 0-4.		B O'Sullivan 1-0, O Walsh 0-1, D White 0-1.

31 July 1966 First round	Mooncoin	2-10 - 1-06	Erin's Own	Nowlan Park
	C Dunne 0-7, J Dunphy 2-0, T Ryan 0-1, N Doyle 0-1, M Doyle 0-1.		K Meally 1-1, T Brennan 0-2, S Coogan 0-2, M Meally 0-1.

=== Second round ===
7 August 1966 Second round	Rower-Inistioge	1-20 - 4-05	Knocktopher	Thomastown Sportsfield, Thomastown
	P Freaney 0-12, T Murphy 0-5, JJ Ryan 1-0, D Ryan 0-1.		F Aylward 3-3, D Heaslip 1-1, F Cummins 0-1.

7 August 1966 Second round	Lisdowney	2-15 - 2-03	Glenmore	Thomastown Sportsfield, Thomastown
	M Carroll 0-8, M Fogarty 1-4, M White 1-1, T Carroll 0-1, D Blanchfield 0-1.		R Fitzgerald 1-0, J Doherty 1-0, S Culleton 0-1, M Cass 0-1, M Cody 0-1.

7 August 1966 Second round	Bennettsbridge	2-14 - 2-02	Éire Óg	Nowlan Park, Kilkenny
	P Moran 0-7, S Carroll 1-2, S Cleere 1-1, J Bennett 0-2, M McCarthy 0-1.		J Langton 1-1, S Dowling 1-0, N Nolan 0-1.

7 August 1966 Second round	Mooncoin	8-12 - 4-07	James Stephens	Nowlan Park, Kilkenny
	T Ryan 5-0, C Dunne 2-7, N Doyle 1-2, T Walsh 0-1, J Dunphy 0-1, D Holden 0-1.		D Brennan 2-1, S Leahy 1-1, M Dunne 0-2, L Tyrrell 0-1, S Brennan 0-1, J McCarthy 0-1.

=== Semi-finals ===
21 August 1966 Semi-final	Bennettsbridge	6-13 - 1-14	Rower-Inistioge	Nowlan Park, Kilkenny
	P Moran 1-7, J Bennett 2-0, J Kinsella 1-1, P Treacy 1-0, S Carroll 0-2, N Ryan 0-1.		P Freaney 1-4, E Keher 0-6, M Kavanagh 0-2, T Murphy 0-2.	Referee: P Johnston

21 August 1966 Semi-final	Mooncoin	2-16 - 2-03	Lisdowney	Nowlan Park, Kilkenny
	C Dunne 1-11, J Dunphy 1-0, E Doyle 0-2, T Walsh 0-1, M Howley 0-1, R Holden 0-1.		W White 1-0, P Dunphy 1-0, D Blanchfield 0-3.

=== Final ===
9 October 1966 Final	Bennettsbridge	4-08 - 2-04	Mooncoin	Nowlan Park, Kilkenny
	J Carroll 1-4, A Kelly 1-2, M McCarthy 1-1, N Ryan 1-0, J Bennett 0-1.		J Dunphy 1-0, T Ryan 1-0, C Dunne 0-2, E Doyle 0-1, J Walsh 0-1.	Referee: P Johnston

== Championship statistics ==
=== Top scorers ===
Overall

Rank	Player	Club	Tally	Total	Matches	Average
1	Claus Dunne	Mooncoin	3-27	36	4	9.00
2	Pierce Freaney	Rower-Inistioge	2-19	25	3	8.33
3	Tom Ryan	Mooncoin	6-01	19	4	4.75
3	Frank Aylward	Knocktopher	4-07	19	2	9.50
5	Paddy Moran	Bennettsbridge	1-15	18	3	6.00
6	Jim Bennett	Bennettsbridge	4-04	16	4	4.00
7	Joe Dunphy	Mooncoin	4-01	13	4	3.25
7	Tommy Murphy	Rower-Inistioge	1-10	13	3	4.33
9	Noel Skehan	Bennettsbridge	3-02	11	4	2.75
10	Eddie Keher	Rower-Inistioge	0-10	10	3	3.33

In a single game

Rank	Player	Club	Tally	Total	Opposition
1	Tom Ryan	Mooncoin	5-00	15	James Stephens
2	Pierce Freaney	Rower-Inistioge	1-11	14	Lisdowney
3	Claus Dunne	Mooncoin	2-07	13	James Stephens
4	Frank Aylward	Knocktopher	3-03	12	Rower-Inistioge
4	Pierce Freaney	Rower-Inistioge	0-12	12	Knocktopher
6	Noel Skehan	Bennettsbridge	3-02	11	Young Irelands
7	Paddy Moran	Bennettsbridge	1-07	10	Rower-Inistioge
8	Richie Grace	Éire Óg	3-00	9	St. Lachtain's
9	Tommy O'Connell	Éire Óg	1-05	8	St. Lachtain's
9	Mick Carroll	Lisdowney	0-08	8	Glenmore
