= Seán Buckley (hurler) =

Irish hurler (born 1938)

Personal information
- Native name: Seán Ó Buachalla (Irish)
- Born: 1938 (age 87–88) Freshford, County Kilkenny
- Height: 5 ft 7 in (170 cm)

Sport
- Sport: Hurling
- Position: Left wing-forward
Club
- Years: Club
- 1950s–1970s: St Lachtain's
Club titles
- Kilkenny titles: 1
Inter-county
- Years: County
- 1957–1960: Kilkenny
Inter-county titles
- Leinster titles: 4 (1 as sub)
- All-Irelands: 2 (1 as sub)
- NHL: 0
- All Stars: 0

Seán Buckley (born 1938) is an Irish former sportsperson. He played hurling with his local club St Lachtain's and was a member of the Kilkenny senior inter-county team from 1957 until 1970.

Sporting positions
Preceded by Séamus Cleere	Kilkenny Senior Hurling Captain; 1964	Succeeded by Paddy Moran
