= 1952 Kilkenny Senior Hurling Championship =

Annual hurling competition season

- Dates: 25 May – 31 August 1952
- Teams: 8
- Champions: Bennettsbridge (2nd title); Dan Kennedy (captain)
- Runners-up: Tullaroan

Tournament statistics
- Matches played: 8
- Goals scored: 48 (6 per match)
- Points scored: 98 (12.25 per match)

The 1952 Kilkenny Senior Hurling Championship was the 58th staging of the Kilkenny Senior Hurling Championship since its establishment by the Kilkenny County Board in 1887. The championship ran from 25 May to 31 August 1952.

Carrickshock were the defending champions, however, they were beaten by Tullaroan in the semi-finals.

The final was played on 31 August 1952 at Nowlan Park in Kilkenny, between Bennettsbridge and Tullaroan, in what was their first ever meeting in the final. Bennettsbridge won the match by 5–03 to 4–05 to claim their second championship title overall and a first title in 62 years.

== Team changes ==
=== To Championship ===
Promoted from the Kilkenny Junior Hurling Championship

- Bennettsbridge

== Results ==
=== First round ===
25 May 1952 First round	Carrickshock	1-11 - 1-02	Mooncoin	Nowlan Park

1 June 1952 First round	Tullaroan	3-09 - 1-04	Éire Óg	Nowlan Park

29 June 1952 First round	Bennettsbridge	3-10 - 3-03	Slieverue	Thomastown Grounds

13 July 1952 First round	Dicksboro	1-10 - 3-04	Graigue	Nowlan Park

27 July 1952 First round replay	Dicksboro	1-04 - 1-08	Graigue	Nowlan Park

=== Semi-finals ===
20 July 1952 Semi-final	Tullaroan	4-09 - 4-04	Carrickshock	Nowlan Park

17 August 1952 Semi-final	Bennettsbridge	7-07 - 6-05	Graigue	Nowlan Park

=== Final ===
31 August 1952 Final	Bennettsbridge	5-03 - 4-05	Tullaroan	Nowlan Park
	M Kelly 4-0, R Carroll 1-0, D Kennedy 0-2, J Marnell 0-1.		S Clohessy 2-0, P Spencer 2-0, T Walton 0-2, S Downey 0-1, P Dowling 0-1, W Costigan 0-1.
