= 1890 Kilkenny Senior Hurling Championship =

Annual hurling competition season

- Champions: Bennettsbridge (1st title)
- Runners-up: Callan

The 1890 Kilkenny Senior Hurling Championship was the fourth staging of the Kilkenny Senior Hurling Championship since its establishment by the Kilkenny County Board.

Bennettsbridge won the championship after a 1–04 to 0–01 defeat of Callan in the final.
