= 1967 Kilkenny Senior Hurling Championship =

Annual hurling competition season

- Dates: 25 June 1967 – 12 November 1967
- Teams: 14
- Champions: Bennettsbridge (11th title)
- Runners-up: Thomastown

Tournament statistics
- Matches played: 14
- Goals scored: 77 (5.5 per match)
- Points scored: 257 (18.36 per match)
- Top scorer(s): Paddy Moran (2-19)

The 1967 Kilkenny Senior Hurling Championship was the 73rd staging of the Kilkenny Senior Hurling Championship since its establishment by the Kilkenny County Board in 1887. The championship began on 25 June 1967 and ended on 12 November 1967.

Bennettsbridge entered the championship as the defending champions.

On 12 November 1967, Bennettsbridge won the championship after a 3–10 to 1–04 defeat of Thomastown in the final. It was their 11th championship title overall and their second title in succession.

Bennettsbridge's Paddy Moran was the championship's top scorer with 2–19.

== Team changes ==
=== To Championship ===
Promoted from the Kilkenny Junior Hurling Championship

- Galmoy

=== From Championship ===
Regraded to the Kilkenny Junior Hurling Championship

- Knocktopher

== Results ==
=== First round ===
25 June 1967 First round	Tullogher	3-10 - 1-08	Galmoy	Nowlan Park

2 July 1967 First round	James Stephens	4-08 - 4-06	Tullaroan	Nowlan Park
	J Connors 2-0, M Dunne 1-2, N Brennan 1-0, S Leahy 0-3, W Ayres 0-2, D Brennan 0-1.		J Hennessy 1-2, N Doheny 1-0, C Butler 1-0, N Maher 1-0, P O'Neill 0-1, P Doheny 0-1, W Fitzgerald 0-1, JJ O'Sullivan 0-1.

23 July 1967 First round	Lisdowney	4-07 - 3-13	St. Senan's	Nowlan Park
	N Holohan 2-0, M Carroll 1-1, M White 1-0, D Blanchfield 0-3, M Gogarty 0-2, M Mackey 0-1.		P Sweeney 1-3, T Gaule 1-3, T Kent 1-0, S Cooke 0-3, F Walsh 0-2, S Sutton 0-1, T Hogan 0-1.

23 July 1967 First round	Mooncoin	3-13 - 3-14	Bennettsbridge	Nowlan Park
	C Dunne 3-6, N Doyle 0-3, T Grant 0-2, J Dunphy 0-2, D Holden 0-1.		P Moran 0-8, J Kinsella 1-3, A Kelly 1-0, J Bennett 1-0, S Carroll 0-1.

30 July 1967 First round	Young Irelands	4-12 - 3-05	Éire Óg	Nowlan Park
	M Dwyer 1-4, M Kelly 1-1, J McCarthy 0-4, J Byrne 1-0, A Comerford 1-0, P Comerford 0-1, B Phelan 0-1, S Kelly 0-1.		M Long 1-1, E Doyle 0-4, M Dowling 1-0, P Long 1-0.

30 July 1967 First round	Erin's Own	3-10 - 3-08	Rower-Inistioge	Nowlan Park
	S Coogan 2-6, J O'Shea 1-0, T Brennan 0-2, M Meally 0-1.		E Keher 0-6, G Mackey 1-0, P Murphy 1-0, M Kavanagh 1-0, J Walsh 0-1, W Murphy 0-1.

30 July 1967 First round	Thomastown	3-05 - 1-09	St. Lachtain's	Nowlan Park
	P Kelly 3-0, B O'Sullivan 0-2, J Delaney 0-2, J Blanchfield 0-1.		S Buckley 1-4, A Hickey 0-2, J Cullinane 0-1, S Rafferty 0-1.

=== Second round ===
6 August 1967 Second round	Bennettsbridge	4-10 - 5-06	Young Irelands	Nowlan Park
	S Carroll 1-2, J Bennett 1-1, T Kelly 1-1, P McCarthy 1-0, P Moran 0-2, P Treacy 0-1, M McCarthy 0-1, J Carroll 0-1.		M Dwyer 1-1, J Byrne 1-0, J McCarthy 1-0, M Kelly 1-0, P Comerford 1-0, A Comerford 0-2, B Kennedy 0-1, S Kelly 0-1.

6 August 1967 Second round	Thomastown	2-10 - 2-05	Tullogher	Nowlan Park
	T Walsh 1-3, J Delaney 0-4, P Kelly 1-0, V Kirby 0-1, O Walsh 0-1.		P Murphy 0-5, T Doolan 1-0, B Conway 1-0.

20 August 1967 Second round	Erin's Own	3-11 - 1-08	James Stephens	Nowlan Park
	S Coogan 1-3, E Holland 1-1, M Meally 1-0, K Meally 0-2, K Meally 0-1, J Byrne 0-1, P Comerford 0-1.		D Brennan 0-4, M Gargan 1-0, J Ayres 0-2, M Dunne 0-1, L Tyrrell 0-1.

=== Semi-finals ===
8 October 1967 Semi-final	Bennettsbridge	2-13 - 0-12	Erin's Own	Nowlan Park
	P Moran 1-3, N Ryan 1-1, S Carroll 0-3, JJ Kinsella 0-2, J Bennett 0-1, T Kelly 0-1.		S Coogan 0-6, T Brennan 0-3, M Coogan 0-2, K Meally 0-1.	Referee: J Murphy (Tullogher)

8 October 1967 Semi-final	Thomastown	4-12 - 5-09	St. Senan's	Nowlan Park
	B O'Sullivan 2-7, S Kearney 1-0, P Kelly 1-0, L O'Neill 0-2, J Delaney 0-1, O Walsh 0-1, T Hoyne 0-1.		P Hoban 2-0, F Walsh 1-2, S Sutton 1-2, S Cooke 1-0, T Gaule 0-3, P Sweeney 0-1, C Knox 0-1.	Referee: J Murphy (Tullogher)

22 October 1967 Semi-final replay	Thomastown	2-09 - 1-10	St. Senan's	Nowlan Park
	B O'Sullivan 1-5, J Murphy 1-1, J Delaney 0-1, S Kearney 0-1, T Hoyne 0-1.		T Gaule 0-4, S Cooke 0-4, P Hoban 1-0, P Hogan 0-1, P Sweeney 0-1.	Referee: T Ryall

=== Final ===
12 November 1967 Final	Bennettsbridge	3-10 - 1-04	Thomastown	Nowlan Park
	P Moran 1-6, J Kinsella 1-1, T Kelly 1-0, P Treacy 0-2, J Carroll 0-1.		J Murphy 1-0, S Kearney 0-1, V Kirby 0-1, J Kelly 0-1, B O'Sullivan 0-1.	Referee: T Ryall

== Championship statistics ==
=== Top scorers ===
Overall

Rank	Player	Club	Tally	Total	Matches	Average
1	Paddy Moran	Bennettsbridge	2-19	25	4	6.25
2	Séamus Coogan	Erin's Own	3-15	24	3	8.00
2	Brendan O'Sullivan	Thomastown	3-15	24	5	4.80
3	Claus Dunne	Mooncoin	3-06	15	1	15.80
3	Paddy Kelly	Thomastown	5-00	15	5	3.80

In a single game

Rank	Player	Club	Tally	Total	Opposition
1	Claus Dunne	Mooncoin	3-06	15	Bennettsbridge
2	Brendan O'Sullivan	Thomastown	2-07	13	St. Senan's
3	Séamus Coogan	Erin's Own	2-06	12	Rower-Inistioge
4	Paddy Kelly	Thomastown	3-00	9	St. Lachtain's
4	Paddy Moran	Bennettsbridge	1-06	9	Thomastown
5	Brendan O'Sullivan	Thomastown	1-05	8	St. Senan's
5	Paddy Moran	Bennettsbridge	0-08	8	Mooncoin
