= 1959 Kilkenny Senior Hurling Championship =

Annual hurling competition season

- Dates: 10 May – 29 November 1959
- Teams: 13
- Champions: Bennettsbridge (6th title)
- Runners-up: Erin's Own

Tournament statistics
- Matches played: 12
- Goals scored: 83 (6.92 per match)
- Points scored: 155 (12.92 per match)

The 1959 Kilkenny Senior Hurling Championship was the 65th staging of the Kilkenny Senior Hurling Championship since its establishment by the Kilkenny County Board in 1887. The championship ran from 10 May to 29 November 1959.

Tullaroan were the defending champions, however, they were beaten by Bennettsbridge in the first round. St John's, a newly-formed team based in Kilkenny, fielded a team for the first time.

The final was played on 29 November 1959 at Nowlan Park in Kilkenny, between Bennettsbridge and Erin's Own, in what was their first ever meeting in the final. Bennettsbridge won the match by 4–06 to 1–04 to claim their sixth championship title overall and a first title in three years.

== Team changes ==
=== To Championship ===
Promoted from the Kilkenny Junior Hurling Championship

- Erin's Own

== Results ==
=== First round ===
10 May 1959 First round	James Stephens	4-06 - 2-07	Graigue	Nowlan Park

10 May 1959 First round	Erin's Own	4-10 - 5-03	Tullogher	Nowlan Park

17 May 1959 First round	Glenmore	8-03 - 4-00	John Locke's	Grennan Sportsfield

31 May 1959 First round	Bennetstbridge	5-05 - 3-07	Tullaroan	Nowlan Park

7 June 1959 First round	Éire Óg	7-12 - 0-05	St John's	Nowlan Park

5 July 1959 First round	St Senan's	4-08 - 1-10	Slieverue	Nowlan Park

- Dicksboro received a bye in this round.

=== Second round ===
5 July 1959 Second round	James Stephens	3-11 - 4-01	Dicksboro	Nowlan Park

19 July 1959 Second round	Bennettsbridge	4-10 - 2-07	Éire Óg	Nowlan Park

26 July 1959 Second round	Glenmore	4-06 - 3-11	Erin's Own	Grennan Sportsfield

- St Senan's received a bye in this round.

=== Semi-finals ===
9 August 1959 Semi-final	Bennettsbridge	1-11 - 3-10	St Senan's	Nowlan Park

30 August 1959 Semi-final	Erin's Own	4-06 - 3-05	James Stephens	Nowlan Park

=== Final ===
29 November 1959 Final	Bennettsbridge	4-06 - 1-04	Erin's Own	Nowlan Park
				Referee: P Johnston
