= 1956 Kilkenny Senior Hurling Championship =

Annual hurling competition season

- Dates: 8 April – 22 August 1956
- Teams: 11
- Champions: Bennettsbridge (5th title)
- Runners-up: John Locke's; Liam Egan (captain)

Tournament statistics
- Matches played: 10
- Goals scored: 73 (7.3 per match)
- Points scored: 106 (10.6 per match)

The 1956 Kilkenny Senior Hurling Championship was the 62nd staging of the Kilkenny Senior Hurling Championship since its establishment by the Kilkenny County Board in 1887. The championship ran from 8 April to 22 August 1956.

Bennettsbridge were the defending champions.

The final was played on 26 August 1956 at Nowlan Park in Kilkenny, between Bennettsbridge and first-time finalists John Locke's. Bennettsbridge won the match by 2–08 to 3–03 to claim their fifth championship title overall and a second consecutive title.

== Team changes ==
=== To Championship ===
Promoted from the Kilkenny Junior Hurling Championship

- James Stephens

== Results ==
=== First round ===
8 April 1956 First round	Bennettsbridge	8-08 - 4-04	Éire Óg	Nowlan Park

13 May 1956 First round	Graigue	3-06 - 3-02	Tullaroan	Nowlan Park

27 May 1956 First round	James Stephens	5-07 - 3-07	Mooncoin	Grennan Sportsfield

3 June 1956 First round	John Locke's	5-06 - 1-02	Slieverue	Grennan Sportsfield

10 June 1956 First round	Dicksboro	4-05 - 2-01	Thomastown	Nowlan Park

- Glenmore received a bye in this round.

=== Second round ===
24 June 1956 Second round	Bennettsbridge	6-07 - 1-04	Glenmore	Nowlan Park

1 July 1956 Second round	Graigue	4-06 - 1-03	Dicksboro	Grennan Sportsfield

=== Semi-finals ===
29 July 1956 Semi-final	John Locke's	7-10 - 1-06	James Stephens	Nowlan Park

12 August 1956 Semi-final	Bennettsbridge	7-09 - 3-02	Graigue	Nowlan Park

=== Final ===
26 August 1956 Final	Bennettsbridge	2-08 - 3-03	John Locke's	Nowlan Park, Kilkenny
