= 1960 Kilkenny Senior Hurling Championship =

Annual hurling competition season

- Dates: 8 May – 9 October 1960
- Teams: 14
- Champions: Bennettsbridge (7th title)
- Runners-up: Glenmore

Tournament statistics
- Matches played: 13
- Goals scored: 80 (6.15 per match)
- Points scored: 180 (13.85 per match)

The 1960 Kilkenny Senior Hurling Championship was the 66th staging of the Kilkenny Senior Hurling Championship since its establishment by the Kilkenny County Board in 1887. The championship ran from 8 May to 9 October 1960.

Bennettsbridge were the defending champions.

The final was played on 9 October 1960 at Nowlan Park in Kilkenny, between Bennettsbridge and first-time finalists Glenmore. Bennettsbridge won the match by 4–05 to 3–04 to claim their seventh championship title overall and a second consecutive title.

== Team changes ==
=== To Championship ===
Promoted from the Kilkenny Junior Hurling Championship

- St Lachtian's

== Results ==
=== First round ===
8 May 1960 First round	John Locke's	7-12 - 3-02	Dicksboro	Nowlan Park

15 May 1960 First round	Éire Óg	4-08 - 3-03	Tullogher	Thoamstown Sportsfield

29 May 1960 First round	James Stephens	2-04 - 0-09	St Senan's	Thoamstown Sportsfield

29 May 1960 First round	Bennettsbridge	4-12 - 1-06	St Lachtain's	Nowlan Park

14 June 1960 First round	Glenmore	5-12 - 1-04	St John's	Nowlan Park

19 June 1960 First round	Slieverue	4-04 - 2-05	Erin's Own	Nowlan Park

26 June 1960 First round	Tullaroan	2-14 - 1-03	Griague	Nowlan Park

=== Second round ===
3 July 1960 Second round	Slieverue	4-05 - 3-03	John Locke's	Nowlan Park

17 July 1960 Second round	Glenmore	5-08 - 3-05	Éire Óg	Thomastown Sportsfield

24 July 1960 Second round	Bennettsbridge	4-14 - 1-03	James Stephens	Thomastown Sportsfield

- Tullaroan received a bye in this round.

=== Semi-finals ===
31 July 1960 Semi-final	Glenmore	4-08 - 4-05	Slieverue	Nowlan Park

28 August 1960 Semi-final	Bennettsbridge	4-12 - 2-10	Tullaroan	Nowlan Park

=== Final ===
9 October 1960 Final	Bennettsbridge	4-05 - 3-04	Glenmore	Nowlan Park
	M Kelly 1-1, J Carroll 1-0, F Ryan 1-0, S Treacy 1-0, S Cleere 0-2, R Carroll 0-2.		J Sutton 2-2, R Mullally 1-0, M Barron 0-1, R Dowling 0-1.
