= 1953 Kilkenny Senior Hurling Championship =

Annual hurling competition season

- Dates: 3 May – 29 November 1953
- Teams: 11
- Champions: Bennettsbridge (3rd title)
- Runners-up: Slieverue

Tournament statistics
- Matches played: 9
- Goals scored: 61 (6.78 per match)
- Points scored: 125 (13.89 per match)

The 1953 Kilkenny Senior Hurling Championship was the 59th staging of the Kilkenny Senior Hurling Championship since its establishment by the Kilkenny County Board in 1887. The championship ran from 3 May to 29 November 1953.

Bennettsbridge were the defending champions.

The final was played on 29 November 1953 at Nowlan Park in Kilkenny, between Bennettsbridge and first-time finalists Slieverue. Bennettsbridge won the match by 3–11 to 3–06 to claim their third championship title overall and a second consecutive title.

== Rule change ==
The Three Parish Rule was introduced. It was a rule which aimed to prevent the rise of dominant super clubs. It required clubs to reorganise so that no team drew from more than three parishes Danesfort–Dunnamaggin and St Kieran's (Urlingford) were new participants.

== Team changes ==
=== To Championship ===
Promoted from the Kilkenny Junior Hurling Championship

- John Locke's

== Results ==
=== First round ===
3 May 1953 First round	Bennettsbridge	4-06 - 3-05	Danesfort–Dunnamaggin	Nowlan Park

10 May 1953 First round	Slieverue	4-04 - 2-02	Mooncoin	Waterford Gaelic Field

10 May 1953 First round	Éire Óg	7-07 - 2-08	John Locke's	Thomastown Grounds

7 June 1953 First round	Tullaroan	3-17 - 2-04	Dicksboro	Nowlan Park

26 July 1953 First round	Carrickshock	3-09 - 6-08	St Kieran's	Nowlan Park

- Graigue received a bye in this round.

=== Second round ===
23 August 1953 Second round	Bennettsbridge	3-11 - 1-03	Graigue	Nowlan Park

13 September 1953 Second round	Éire Óg	2-04 - 1-02 (Appealed)	Tullaroan	Nowlan Park

- Slieverue and St Kieran's received a bye in this round.

=== Semi-finals ===
27 September 1953 Semi-final	Slieverue	4-09 - 3-02	St Kieran's	Nowlan Park

22 November 1953 Semi-final	Bennettsbridge	5-09 - 3-04	Tullaroan	Nowlan Park

=== Final ===
29 November 1953 Final	Bennettsbridge	3-11 - 3-06	Slieverue	Nowlan Park
	D Carroll 0-8, M Galway 2-0, L Hackett 1-0, J Carroll 0-2, M Kelly 0-1.		P Doyle 2-0, G Buggy 1-1, T Walsh 0-3, W Cahill 0-1, J Doherty 0-1.	Referee: J Phelan

== Championship statistics ==
=== Miscellaneous ===
- The result of the second round match between Bennettsbridge and Graigue was overturned by the Kilkenny County Board, following an objection by Graigue on the grounds that Benettsbridge breached the three parish rule. This was subsequently overturned by the Leinster Council. Tullaroan, who were beaten by Éire Óg in their second round match, objected on similar grounds and had their objection upheld.
