= Claus Dunne =

Irish hurler

Nicholas "Claus" Dunne
Personal information
- Native name: Nioclás Ó Duinn (Irish)
- Nickname: Claus
- Born: 1944 Mooncoin, County Kilkenny, Ireland
- Died: 27 March 2015 (aged 70) Newrath, County Waterford, Ireland
- Occupation: Irish Shell driver
- Height: 5 ft 11 in (180 cm)

Sport
- Sport: Hurling and Soccer
- Position: Centre-forward
Club
- Years: Club
- Mooncoin
Club titles
- Kilkenny titles: 1
Inter-county*
Years	County	Apps (scores)
1965-1973	Kilkenny	12 (1-19)
Inter-county titles
- Leinster titles: 2
- All-Irelands: 2
- NHL: 1
- *Inter County team apps and scores correct as of 13:11, 29 March 2015.

Nicholas "Claus" Dunne (1944 – 27 March 2015) was an Irish hurler who played as a centre-forward for Kilkenny.

Born in Mooncoin, County Kilkenny, Dunne first arrived on the inter-county scene at the age of twenty when he first linked up with the Kilkenny under-21. He made his senior debut during the 1964-65 league. Dunne went on to enjoy a successful career with Kilkenny and won two All-Ireland medals, two Leinster medals and one National Hurling League medal. He was an All-Ireland runner-up on two occasions.

As a member of the Leinster inter-provincial team, Dunne won one Railway Cup medal. At club level he was a one-time championship medallist with Mooncoin.

Dunne made 12 championship appearances. He retired from inter-county hurling following the conclusion of the 1973 championship.

== Playing career ==
=== Club ===
In 1965 Dunne was wing-forward on the Mooncoin team that faced Bennettsbridge in the final of the Kilkenny senior championship. A narrow 2-8 to 1-8 victory gave Dunne a Kilkenny Senior Hurling Championship medal.

=== Inter-county ===
Dunne joined the Kilkenny senior team during the 1964-65 league, a campaign which eventually saw Kilkenny lose out to Tipperary in the home decider. He was later included on the Kilkenny panel for the championship, making his debut on 27 June 1965 in a 1-20 to 3-8 Leinster semi-final defeat of Dublin.

After reaching a second successive league decider in 1966, Dunne collected a National Hurling League medal following an aggregate 10-15 to 2-15 defeat of New York. He later won a first Leinster medal following a 1-15 to 2-6 defeat of Wexford. The subsequent All-Ireland final on 4 September 1966 pitted Kilkenny against Cork for the first time in nineteen years. Kilkenny were the favourites, however, a hat-trick of goals by Colm Sheehan gave Cork a merited 3-9 to 1-10 victory.

Kilkenny retained their provincial crown in 1967, with Dunne adding a second Leinster medal to his collection following a 4-10 to 1-12 defeat of Wexford after a scare in the opening half. On 3 September 1967 Kilkenny faced Tipperary in the All-Ireland decider. Tipp looked like continuing their hoodoo over their near rivals as they took a 2-6 to 1-3 lead at half-time. Goalkeeper Ollie Walsh was the hero for Kilkenny as he made a series of spectacular saves, however, the team lost Eddie Keher and Tom Walsh to injury in the second half. In spite of this, Kilkenny laid to rest a bogey that Tipperary had over the team since 1922, and a 3-8 to 2-7 victory gave Dunne a first All-Ireland medal. He later won a fourth Cú Chulainn award.

Wexford ended Kilkenny's hopes of retaining the title in 1968. However, Kilkenny reached the Leinster final the following year, with Dunne missing the Kilkenny's defeat of Offaly in the final. On 7 September 1969, Kilkenny lined out against Cork in the All-Ireland decider, with Dunne returning to the starting fifteen at right wing-forward. Cork got into their stride following an early goal by Charlie McCarthy and led by six points coming up to half time when Kilkenny scored a goal themselves. Kilkenny upped their performance after the interval and ran out winners on a 2-15 to 2-9 scoreline. The victory gave Dunne a second All-Ireland medal.

Dunne retired from the Kilkenny panel in 1969. However, they recalled him 1973 after Eddie Keher became injured, to help Kilkenny against Limerick in the All-Ireland final on 2 September 1973, however, their plans were hampered as a result of injuries and emigration. In spite of this, the game hung in the balance for the first-half, however, eight minutes after the restart Mossie Dowling got a vital goal for Limerick. Shortly after this Richie Bennis spearheaded a rampant Limerick attack which resulted in a 1-21 to 1-14 victory for Limerick.

=== Inter-provincial ===
In 1967 Dunne was at left wing-forward on the Leinster team that faced Munster in the inter-provincial decider. A 2-14 to 3-5 victory gave Dunne a Railway Cup medal.

== Honours ==
=== Team ===
Mooncoin

- Kilkenny Senior Hurling Championship (1): 1965

Kilkenny

- All-Ireland Senior Hurling Championship (2): 1967, 1969
- Leinster Senior Hurling Championship (4): 1966, 1967, 1969 (sub), 1973 (sub)
- National Hurling League (1): 1965-66

Leinster

- Railway Cup (1): 1967
