= 1964 Kilkenny Senior Hurling Championship =

Annual hurling competition season

- Dates: 3 May 1964 - 1 November 1964
- Teams: 15
- Champions: Bennettsbridge (9th title); Paddy Moran (captain)
- Runners-up: Glenmore

Tournament statistics
- Matches played: 14
- Goals scored: 91 (6.5 per match)
- Points scored: 181 (12.93 per match)

The 1964 Kilkenny Senior Hurling Championship was the 70th staging of the Kilkenny Senior Hurling Championship since its establishment by the Kilkenny County Board in 1887. The championship ran from 3 May to 1 November 1964.

St. Lachtain's were the defending champions, however, they were beaten by Bennettsbridge in the second round.

The final was played on 1 November 1964 at Nowlan Park in Kilkenny, between Bennettsbridge and Glenmore, in what was their second meeting in the final overall. Bennettsbridge won the match by 4–09 to 1–04 to claim their ninth championship title overall and a first title in two years.

== Team changes ==
=== To Championship ===
Promoted from the Kilkenny Junior Hurling Championship

- Rower–Inistioge

== Results ==
=== First round ===
3 May 1964 First round	Éire Óg	3-05 - 2-05	Slieverue	Nowlan Park

7 June 1964 First round	Glenmore	3-11 - 2-06	Tullogher	Mullinavat

26 July 1964 First round	St Lachtain's	4-07 - 1-04	Lisdowney	Nowlan Park

26 July 1964 First round	Bennettsbridge	2-08 - 2-07	Mooncoin	Nowlan Park

2 August 1964 First round	St Senan's	7-06 - 3-03	Erin's Own	Nowlan Park

2 August 1964 Second round	Thomastown	6-10 - 1-04	John Locke's	Nowlan Park

9 August 1964 First round	Rower–Inistioge	2-09 - 2-07	Tullaroan	Nowlan Park
	E Keher 1-5.

=== Second round ===
28 June 1964 Second round	Glenmore	3-08 - 1-02	James Stephens	Thomastown

9 August 1964 Second round	Bennettsbridge	5-08 - 2-04	St Lachtain's	Nowlan Park

23 August 1964 Second round	Rower–Inistioge	7-07 - 7-04	St Senan's	Mullinavat
	E Keher 4-3

23 August 1964 Second round	Thomastown	3-08 - 2-04	Éire Óg	Nowlan Park

=== Semi-finals ===
11 October 1964 Semi-final	Bennettsbridge	5-08 - 3-08	Rower–Inistioge	Nowlan Park
			E Keher 2-5.

11 October 1964 Semi-final	Glenmore	4-09 - 4-06	Thomastown	Nowlan Park

=== Final ===
1 November 1964 Final	Bennettsbridge	4-09 - 1-04	Glenmore	Nowlan Park
	P Cleary 2-0, P Moran 0-6, M McCarthy 1-0, N Skehan 1-0, R Carroll 0-2, T Kelly 0-1.		J Sutton 1-1, M Cash 0-1, R Doherty 0-2.
