= Paddy Moran (hurler) =

Irish hurler (born 1939)

Personal information
- Native name: Pádraig Ó Móráin (Irish)
- Born: 1939 (age 86–87) Bennettsbridge, County Kilkenny, Ireland
- Height: 5 ft 9 in (175 cm)

Sport
- Sport: Hurling
- Position: Midfield
Club
- Years: Club
- 1956–1977: Bennettsbridge
Club titles
- Kilkenny titles: 8
Inter-county*
Years	County	Apps (scores)
1961–1972	Kilkenny	26 (2-8)
Inter-county titles
- Leinster titles: 7
- All-Irelands: 4
- NHL: 1
- *Inter County team apps and scores correct as of 01:28, 1 July 2015.

Patrick Moran (born 1939) is an Irish retired hurler who played as a midfielder for the Kilkenny senior team.

Born in Bennettsbridge, County Kilkenny, Moran first played competitive hurling during his schooling at St. Kieran's College. He arrived on the inter-county scene at the age of sixteen when he first linked up with the Kilkenny minor team. He made his senior debut during the 1961 championship. Moran subsequently became a regular member of the starting fifteen and won four All-Ireland medals, seven Leinster medals and one National Hurling League medal. He was an All-Ireland runner-up on three occasions.

As a member of the Leinster inter-provincial team on a number of occasions Moran won three Railway Cup medals. At club level he is an eight-time championship medallist with Bennettsbridge.

Throughout his career Moran made 26 championship appearances. He retired from inter-county hurling following the conclusion of the 1972 championship.

== Playing career ==
=== Club ===
Moran was still eligible for the minor grade when he made his senior debut with the Bennettsbridge senior team in 1956. He was at right wing-back as the Bridge faced John Lockes in the championship decider. John Lockes had a goal disallowed by an umpire, a factor which contributed to a 2-8 to 3-3 victory for Bennettsbridge. It was Moran's first championship medal.

After failing to retain their title, Bennettsbridge qualified for the county decider again in 1959. A 4-6 to 1-4 defeat of Erin's Own gave Moran a second championship medal.

Bennettsbridge retained the championship in 1960, with Moran adding a third winners' medal to his collection following a narrow 4-5 to 3-4 defeat of Glenmore.

Three-in-a-row proved beyond the Bridge, but Moran lined out in a fourth county final in 1962. Lisdowney, who had recently earned promotion from the junior grade, provided the opposition. Goals were key as Bennettsbridge claimed a 5-7 to 2-8 victory. It was Moran's fourth championship medal.

After surrendering their championship crown the following year, Bennettsbridge bounced back to contest the decider again in 1964. On a day when five Treacy brothers lined out for the Bridge, they recorded a 4-9 to 1-4 victory over Glenmore. It was Moran's fifth championship medal.

Mooncoin ended hopes of retaining the title in 1965, as Moran suffered his first defeat in a county final, however, both sides renewed their rivalry in the 1966 decider. A double scores 4-8 to 2-4 victory avenged the previous year's defeat and gave Moran a sixth championship medal.

Bennettsbridge continued to dominate club hurling once again in 1967. A 3-10 to 1-4 defeat of Thomastown earned a seventh championship medal for Moran.

A period of decline followed following defeat by Rower-Inistioge in the 1968 decider, however, Bennettsbridge returned to the summit of club hurling again in 1971. A 3-10 to 1-7 defeat of reigning champions Fenians gave Moran his eighth and final championship medal.

Moran continued t line out with Bennettsbridge for the next few years, however, his side were defeated by Fenians in the finals of 1972 and 1974.

=== Minor ===
Moran was sixteen year-old when he was called up to the Kilkenny minor team in 1956. He won a Leinster medal that year following a 4–7 to 3–7 defeat of Wexford in the provincial decider. On 23 September 1956 Kilkenny faced Tipperary in the All-Ireland final. A 4–16 to 1–5 trouncing, with teen sensation Jimmy Doyle contributing 2-3, resulted in defeat for Moran and his side.

The following year Moran added a second Leinster medal to his collection, as Offaly were defeated by 5–10 to 4–2. For the second year in-a-row, Tipperary provided the opposition in the All-Ireland final on 1 September 1957. In a close game Tipperary eventually triumphed by 4–7 to 3–7.

=== Senior ===
==== Early success ====
Moran made his senior championship debut on 18 June 1961 in a 6-8 to 5-7 Leinster semi-final defeat by Wexford.

After two years without success, Moran won his first Leinster medal following a 2–10 to 0–9 defeat of Dublin. This victory allowed Kilkenny to advance directly into an All-Ireland showdown with Waterford on 1 September 1963. "The Cats" entered the game as underdogs, however, Eddie Keher proved to be the difference with a magnificent display in which he scored fourteen points. Despite a hat-trick of goals from Waterford's Séamus Power, Kilkenny secured a 4–17 to 6–8 victory. It was Moran's first All-Ireland medal.

==== All-Ireland defeats ====
Moran added a second Leinster medal to his collection in 1964 as Dublin were defeated on a 4–11 to 1–8 score line. The All-Ireland final on 6 September 1964 saw Kilkenny enter the game as firm favourites against fierce rivals Tipperary. John "Mackey" McKenna scored Tipperary's first goal after ten minutes as the Munster champions took a 1–8 to 0–6 interval lead. The second half saw Tipperary score goals for fun, with Donie Nealon getting a hat-trick and Seán McLoughlin another. Kilkenny were humiliated at the full-time whistle as Tipperary triumphed by 5–13 to 2–8. In spite of this defeat Moran's performances throughout the year earned him a Cú Chulainn Award.

After surrendering their provincial crown in 1965, Kilkenny bounced back the following year by reaching the final of the National Hurling League. An aggregate 10–15 to 2–15 defeat of New York gave Moran a league medal. He later won a third Leinster medal following a 1–15 to 2–6 defeat of Wexford. The subsequent All-Ireland final on 4 September 1966 pitted Kilkenny against Cork for the first time in nineteen years. Kilkenny were the favourites, however, a hat-trick of goals by Colm Sheehan gave Cork a merited 3–9 to 1–10 victory. There was some consolation before the end of the year, with Moran winning an Oireachtas medal following a 4-7 to 1-7 victory over Wexford.

==== Kilkenny resurgence ====
Moran collected a fourth Leinster medal in 1967 as Kilkenny retained their provincial crown following a 4–10 to 1–12 defeat of Wexford after a scare in the opening half. On 3 September 1967 Kilkenny faced Tipperary in the All-Ireland decider. Tipperary looked like continuing their hoodoo over their near rivals as they took a 2–6 to 1–3 lead at half-time. Goalkeeper Ollie Walsh was the hero for Kilkenny as he made a series of spectacular saves, however, the team lost Eddie Keher and Tom Walsh to injury in the second half. In spite of this, Kilkenny laid to rest a bogey that Tipperary had over the team since 1922, and a 3–8 to 2–7 victory gave Carroll a second All-Ireland medal. He finished off the year by claiming a second Oireachtas medal following a 4-4 to 1-8 defeat of Clare and a second Cú Chulainn Award.

Wexford ended Kilkenny's hopes of retaining the title in 1968. However, Kilkenny won the Leinster title the following year with Moran collecting a fifth Leinster medal following a 3–9 to 0–16 defeat of Offaly in the final. On 7 September 1969, Kilkenny took on Cork in the All-Ireland decider, however, Moran was dropped from the starting fifteen. Cork got into their stride following an early goal by Charlie McCarthy and led by six points coming up to half time when Kilkenny scored a goal themselves. Kilkenny upped their performance after the interval and ran out winners on a 2–15 to 2–9 scoreline. The victory gave Moran, who came on as a substitute, a third All-Ireland medal. Cork and Kilkenny met again before the end of the year, and a 4-14 to 3-10 victory gave Moran a third Oireachtas medal.

==== Twilight success ====
After surrendering their provincial and All-Ireland crowns to Wexford the following year, Moran remained dropped from the starting fifteen in 1971. He was a non-playing substitute as Kilkenny defeated Wexford by 6-16 to 3-16 to take the Leinster title once again. On 5 September 1971 Kilkenny faced Tipperary in the All-Ireland final, however, Moran still remained on the bench. He was eventually introduced as a substitute, however, Tipperary emerged the victors on a score line of 5–17 to 5–14.

Moran played an increasingly peripheral role during 1972 and, after being introduced as a substitute in the drawn provincial final, he remained on the bench for the reply which Kilkenny won by defeating Wexford. Cork provided the opposition in the All-Ireland final on 3 September 1972, a game which is often considered to be one of the classic games of the modern era. Halfway through the second-half Cork were on form and stretched their lead to eight points. Kilkenny's great scoring threat, Eddie Keher, was deployed closer to goal and finished the game with 2–9. A fifteen-point swing resulted in Kilkenny winning the game by 3–24 to 5–11. Moran, who started the game on the bench but was introduced as a substitute, won his fourth All-Ireland medal before bringing the curtain down on his inter-county career.

== Honours ==
=== Player ===
Bennettsbridge

- Kilkenny Senior Hurling Championship (8): 1956, 1959, 1960, 1962, 1964, 1966, 1967, 1971

Kilkenny

- All-Ireland Senior Hurling Championship (4): 1963, 1967, 1969, 1972
- Leinster Senior Hurling Championship (7): 1963, 1964, 1966, 1967, 1969, 1971 (sub), 1972 (sub)
- National Hurling League (1): 1965-66
- Oireachtas Tournament (3): 1966, 1967, 1969
- Leinster Minor Hurling Championship (2): 1956, 1957

Leinster

- Railway Cup (3): 1964, 1965, 1967

Sporting positions
Preceded by Seán Buckley	Kilkenny Senior Hurling Captain; 1965	Succeeded by Jim Lynch
