= 1963 All-Ireland Senior Hurling Championship final =

1963 All-Ireland Senior Hurling Final
- Event: 1963 All-Ireland Senior Hurling Championship
Kilkenny	Waterford
4–17	6–8
- Date: 1 September 1963
- Venue: Croke Park, Dublin
- Referee: J. Hatton (Wicklow)
- Attendance: 73,123

The 1963 All-Ireland Senior Hurling Championship Final was the 76th All-Ireland Final and the culmination of the 1963 All-Ireland Senior Hurling Championship, an inter-county hurling tournament for the top teams in Ireland. The match was held at Croke Park, Dublin, on 1 September 1963, between Kilkenny and Waterford. Waterford, the Munster champions, lost to their Leinster opponents on a score line of 4–17 to 6–8.

== Match details ==
1 September 1963
15:15 UTC+1

Kilkenny	4–17 (29) – (26) 6–8	Waterford

Croke Park, Dublin
Attendance: 73,123
Referee: J. Hatton (Wicklow)
