= 1955 Kilkenny Senior Hurling Championship =

Annual hurling competition season

- Dates: 22 May – 6 November 1955
- Teams: 12
- Champions: Bennettsbridge (4th title); Billy Dobbyn (captain)
- Runners-up: Mooncoin

Tournament statistics
- Matches played: 12
- Goals scored: 73 (6.08 per match)
- Points scored: 135 (11.25 per match)

The 1955 Kilkenny Senior Hurling Championship was the 61st staging of the Kilkenny Senior Hurling Championship since its establishment by the Kilkenny County Board in 1887. The championship ran from 22 May to 6 November 1955.

Slieverue were the defending champions, however, they were beaten by John Locke's in the first round.

The final was played on 6 November 1955 at Nowlan Park in Kilkenny, between Bennettsbridge and Mooncoin, in what was their first ever meeting in the final. Bennettsbridge won the match by 6–06 to 1–04 to claim their fourth championship title overall and a first title in two years.

== Team changes ==
=== To Championship ===
Promoted from the Kilkenny Junior Hurling Championship

- Carrickshock

== Results ==
=== First round ===
22 May 1955 First round	Bennettsbridge	8-10 - 0-02	Thomastown	Nowlan Park

29 May 1955 First round	Éire Óg	3-07 - 4-03	Danesfort	Nowlan Park

7 July 1955 First round	Glenmore	5-07 - 4-06	Dicksboro	Grennan Sportsfield

10 July 1955 First round	Slieverue	2-03 - 2-09	John Locke's	Nowlan Park

7 August 1955 First round	Carrickshock	4-04 - 3-07	Graigue	Nowlan Park

14 August 1955 First round	Mooncoin	1-05 - 0-04	Tullaroan	Nowlan Park

11 September 1955 First round replay	Carrickshock	2-05 - 4-10	Graigue	Nowlan Park

=== Second round ===
21 August 1955 Second round	Bennettsbridge	4-08 - 1-07	Éire Óg	Nowlan Park

28 August 1955 Second round	John Locke's	4-07 - 2-06	Glenmore	Nowlan Park

- Graigue and Mooncoin received byes in this round.

=== Semi-finals ===
18 September 1955 Semi-final	Bennetstbridge	8-06 - 4-02	John Locke's	Nowlan Park

16 October 1955 Semi-final	Mooncoin	1-04 - 0-03	Graigue	Nowlan Park

=== Final ===
6 November 1955 Final	Bennettsbridge	6-06 - 1-04	Mooncoin	Nowlan Park
				Referee: J Mulcahy
