= 1962 Kilkenny Senior Hurling Championship =

Annual hurling competition season

- Champions: Bennettsbridge (8th title)
- Runners-up: Lisdowney

The 1962 Kilkenny Senior Hurling Championship was the 68th staging of the Kilkenny Senior Hurling Championship since its establishment by the Kilkenny County Board in 1887.

St Lachtain's were the defending champions, however, they were beaten by Bennettsbridge in the second round.

The final was played on 19 August 1962 at Nowlan Park in Kilkenny, between Bennettsbridge and first-time finalists Lisdowney. Bennettsbridge won the match by 5–07 to 2–08 to claim their eighth championship title overall and a first title in two years.

== Results ==
=== Semi-finals ===
29 July 1962 Semi-final	Lisdowney	4-11 - 1-04	Glenmore	Nowlan Park

Semi-final	Bennettsbridge	w/o - scr.	Erin's Own

=== Final ===
19 August 1962 Final	Bennettsbridge	5-07 - 2-08	Lisdowney	Nowlan Park
				Referee: T Ryall (Graigue)
