= Bennettsbridge GAA =

Gaelic games club in County Kilkenny, Ireland

Bennettsbridge
- Droichead Binéid
- Founded: 1888
- County: Kilkenny
- Nickname: The Bridge
- Colours
- Grounds: Páirc Dhroichead Binéid
- Coordinates: 52°35′38.56″N 7°10′54.94″W

Playing kits
Standard colours

Senior Club Championships
	All Ireland	Leinster champions	Kilkenny champions
Hurling:	0	0	12

Bennettsbridge GAA is a Gaelic Athletic Association club in Bennettsbridge, County Kilkenny, Ireland. The club is affiliated to the Kilkenny County Board and fields teams in both hurling and Gaelic football.

== History ==
Located in the village of Bennettsbridge, about 6 km south of Kilkenny city, Bennettsbridge GAA Club was founded in 1888. The new club made an immediate impact by reaching the 1890 Kilkenny SHC final, however, they lost out to Callan by 1–04 to 0–01.

Bennettsbridge spent the majority of the next 60 years operating in the Kilkenny JHC, with title victories in 1935, 1948 and 1951. A 5–03 to 4–05 win over Tullaroan saw the club claim a second Kilkenny SHC in 1952. This began a golden era for Bennettsbridge, with players like Johnny McGovern, Dan Kennedy, Séamus Cleere and Noel Skehan helping the club to 11 Kilkenny SHC titles in a 20-season span between 1952 and 1971.

The 21st century saw Bennettsbridge once again return to the junior grade. The club won it's fourth Kilkenny JHC title in 2014, following a 1–17 to 1–07 win over Mooncoin. This was subsequently converted into a Leinster Club JHC title, before a 3–19 to 1–08 win over Fullen Gaels in the 2015 All-Ireland Club JHC final. Bennettsbridge won a second consecutive All-Ireland club hurling title in 2016, when a 1–17 to 1–14 defeat of Abbeyknockmoy secured the All-Ireland Club IHC title.

== Honours ==
- Kilkenny Senior Hurling Championship (12): 1890, 1952, 1953, 1955, 1956, 1959, 1960, 1962, 1964, 1966, 1967, 1971
- All-Ireland Intermediate Club Hurling Championship (1): 2016
- Leinster Intermediate Club Hurling Championship (1): 2015
- Kilkenny Intermediate Hurling Championship (1): 2015
- All-Ireland Junior Club Hurling Championship (1): 2015
- Leinster Junior Club Hurling Championship (1): 2014
- Kilkenny Junior Hurling Championship (4): 1935, 1948, 1951, 2014
- Kilkenny Junior Football Championship (3): 1969, 1989, 1999
- Kilkenny Under-21 Hurling Championship (2): 1967, 1985
- Kilkenny Minor Hurling Championship (3): 1947, 1983, 2011

== Notable players ==
- Séamus Cleere: All-Ireland SHC-winning captain (1963)
- Mickey Kelly: All-Ireland SHC-winning captain (1957)
- Noel Skehan: All-Ireland SHC-winning captain (1972)
- Jim Treacy: All-Ireland SHC-winning captain (1967)
