= Bennettsbridge =

Village in County Killkenny, Ireland

Bennettsbridge Droichead Binéid
- Village
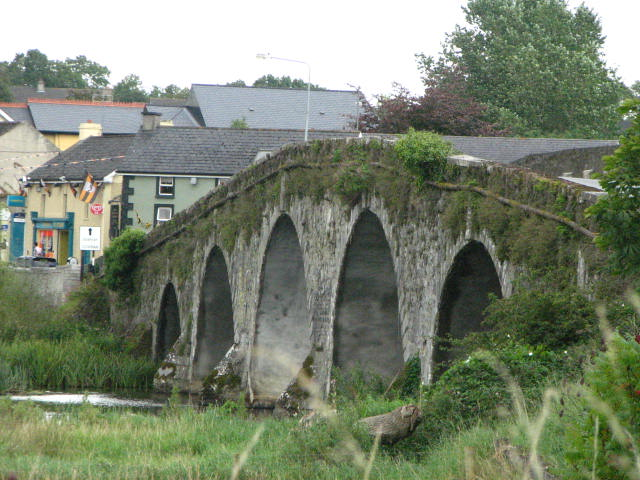
- Bennetts Bridge, named for Saint Benet, from which the village takes its name

- Location in Ireland
- Coordinates: 52°36′N 7°11′W
- Country: Ireland
- Province: Leinster
- County: County Kilkenny

Population (2016)
  - Total: 745
- Time zone: UTC+0 (WET)
  - Summer (DST): UTC-1 (IST (WEST))

Bennettsbridge (Irish: Droichead Binéid, meaning 'Bennet's bridge') is a village in County Kilkenny in Ireland. It is situated on the River Nore 6 kilometres (3.7 mi) south of Kilkenny city, in the centre of the county. Bennettsbridge is a census town, and had population of 745 as of the 2016 census.

The village is on the R700 road at a stone bridge crossing of the Nore between Kilkenny and Thomastown. It has become a craft centre in recent years, with several pottery and craft producers located at the old mill beside the weir.

The village is part of the parish of Tullaherin which contains an almost intact 9th-century round tower.

== History ==
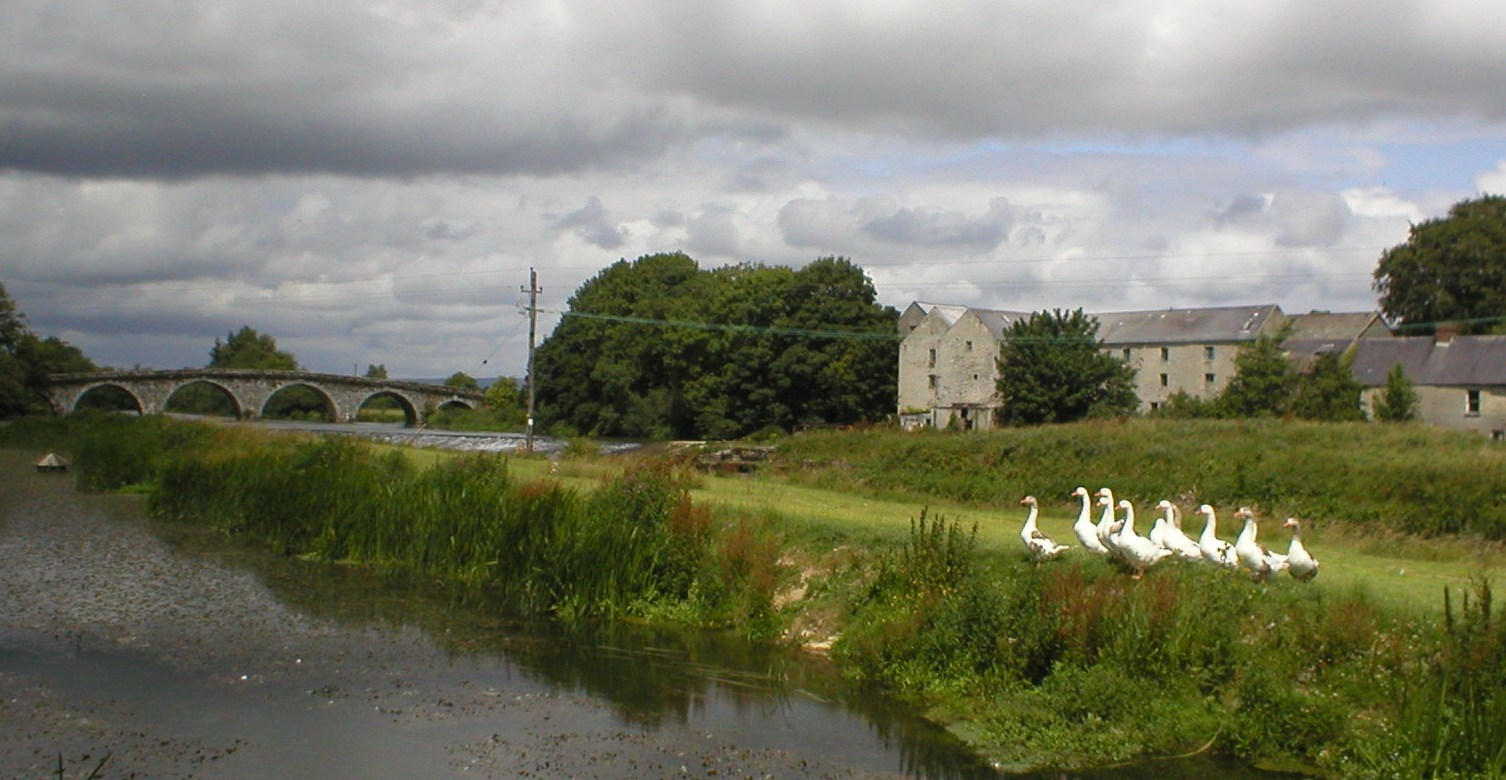
Bennettsbridge—view from the pottery weir

Bennettsbridge owes its name to Saint Benet and its strategic importance to its position at a major crossing of the river Nore. The first bridge was built on the site in 1285 and was dedicated to the saint, and was important for transport until the establishment of the railway. The current bridge dates from the 18th century after the original bridge was swept away in a flood in 1763. There were flour-mills at the weir and there was a Royal Irish Constabulary police station in the village.

== Geography ==
Bennettsbridge is located along the river Nore at a ford of the river about 10 kilometres (6 mi) from Gowran. There are two old mills downstream from the bridge. Ducks and swans and other river life are present in abundance.

== Transport ==
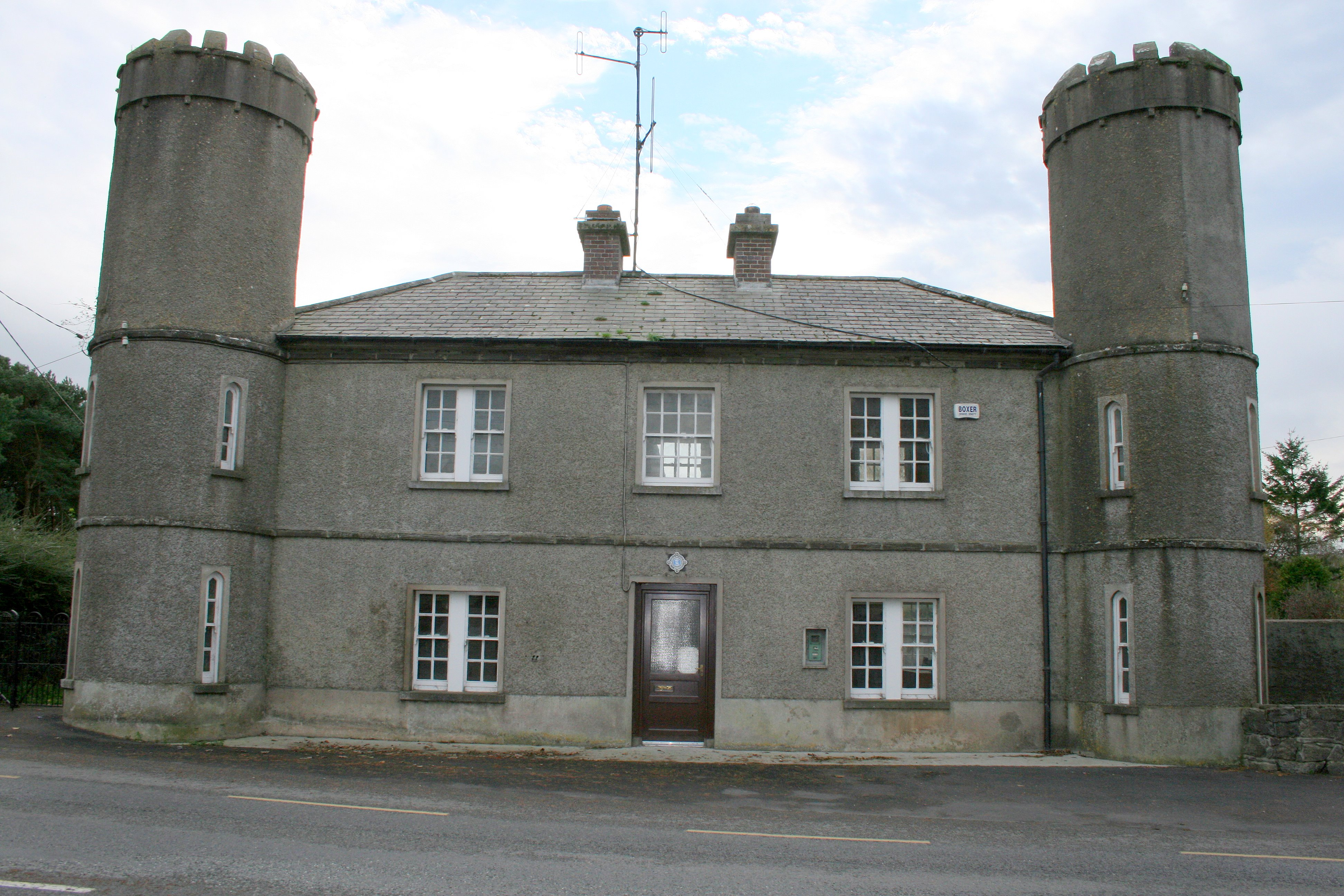
Fortified police station

=== Road ===
Bennettsbridge lies on the R700 regional road which carries much tourist traffic in the summertime from the Rosslare ferries, through Kilkenny and on into the midlands and Galway.

=== Bus ===
The village is served by Bus Éireann route 73 (Waterford – Kilkenny - Athlone). TFI Local Link service 882 from Kilkenny to New Ross also serves Bennetsbridge. In the summer, a scheduled Ring A Link bus allows visitors to access local craft outlets before taking a riverside walk back to Kilkenny.

=== Rail ===
Bennettsbridge railway station opened on 2 September 1861, but closed permanently on 15 February 1965. Nowadays the nearest rail station is Kilkenny railway station around 9 kilometres distant.

== Landmarks ==
=== Bennett's Bridge ===
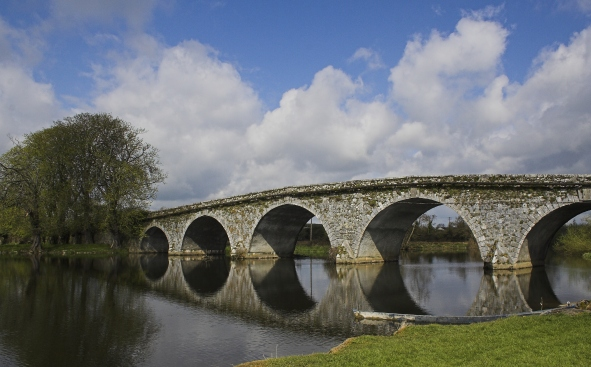
Bennett's Bridge, in Bennettsbridge, over the River Nore

There is record of Bennett's Bridge in 1393, when John Midleton, guardian of the chapel of St. Mary received licence to fortify the bridge. The ancient viaduct was destroyed by the great flood of 1793. The flood washed away many of the major bridges crossing the River Nore and so a comprehensive rebuilding programme was initiated in the eighteenth century. Kilkenny architect William Robertson worked on it in 1826, with the design of the bridge attributed (according to the National Inventory of Architectural Heritage) to George Smith. Other bridges, built or rebuilt in the same period, include Green's Bridge in Kilkenny City, Thomastown Bridge on the River Nore, Graiguenamanagh Bridge on the River Barrow, Inistioge Bridge on the Nore, Goresbridge on the Barrow, and the bridge at Mount Juliet.

=== Parks and recreation ===
Nore Valley Park, 3.2 km from Bennettsbridge, includes a camping and caravan park, activity centre, open farm, farm trail, crazy golf course and a picnic and barbecue area. There is lake fishing at Wallslough Village.

== Arts and crafts ==
Nicholas Mosse Pottery was established by Nicholas Mosse in 1976. It is located at an old riverside mill in Bennettsbridge. It is possible to watch potters at work as they produce pottery in the style of Irish Spongeware which was a traditional 18th Century type of pottery.

Stoneware Jackson is another local pottery studio. The pieces are hand-thrown, featuring two-color glazing and Celtic motifs.

Moth to a Flame is a local candle maker based on the Bennettsbridge road on the way into the village coming from Kilkenny city.

== Sport ==
Bennettsbridge GAA is the local Gaelic Athletic Association club.

== People ==
- Noel Skehan, former Kilkenny hurling goalkeeper.
- Hubert Butler, the essayist.
- James McGarry, former Kilkenny hurling goalkeeper.
- John McGovern, former Kilkenny hurling player.

== See also ==
- List of towns and villages in Ireland
