= 1967 All-Ireland Senior Hurling Championship =

Championship details
- Dates: 14 May - 3 September 1967
- Teams: 12

All-Ireland champions
- Winning team: Kilkenny (16th win)
- Captain: Jim Treacy

All-Ireland Finalists
- Losing team: Tipperary
- Captain: Mick Roche

Provincial champions
- Munster: Tipperary
- Leinster: Kilkenny
- Ulster: Not Played
- Connacht: Not Played

Championship statistics
- No. matches played: 11
- Player of the Year: Ollie Walsh
- All-Star Team: See here

The All-Ireland Senior Hurling Championship of 1967 was the 81st staging of Ireland's premier hurling knock-out competition. Kilkenny won the championship, beating Tipperary 3–8 to 2–7 in the final at Croke Park, Dublin.

== Format ==
The All-Ireland Senior Hurling Championship was run on a provincial basis as usual. All games were played on a knockout basis whereby once a team lost they were eliminated from the championship. The format for the All-Ireland series of games ran as follows:

- There were no All-Ireland semi-finals.
- The winners of the Munster Championship advanced directly to the All-Ireland final.
- The winners of the Leinster Championship advanced directly to the All-Ireland final.
- The Ulster Championship remained suspended due to a lack of competition.
- Galway, a team who faced no competition in the Connacht Championship, played in the Munster Championship for the ninth consecutive year.

== Fixtures ==
=== Leinster Senior Hurling Championship ===
May 14, 1967
First Round

Offaly	4–8 – 5–10	Westmeath
P. Molloy (2–5), J. Flaherty (1–0), B. Barry (1–0), B. Moylan (0–2), T. Dooley (0–1).		T. Ring (1–5), M. Flanagan (2–1), J. Walsh (1–1), T. O'Donoghue (1–0), P. Jackson (0–2), L. Jackson (0–1).

St. Brendan's Park, Birr

May 21, 1967
Second Round

Laois	5–11 – 3–9	Westmeath
C. O'Brien (1–5), M. Mahon (2–1), D. Conroy (1–1), B. Delaney (1–1), J. Lyons (0–2), J. Dooley (0–1).		T. Ring (0–6), J. Walsh (1–2), J. Kenry (1–0), M. Fagan (1–0), T. O'Donoghue (0–1).

O'Connor Park, Tullamore
Referee: P. Johnston (Kilkenny)

June 25, 1967
Semi-Final

Wexford	6–10 – 1–6	Laois
P. Lynch (2–2), T. Doran (1–2), J. O'Brien (1–2), F. Duff (1–0), B. Wilson (1–0), C. Jacob (0–2), P. Quigley (0–1), R. Shannon (0–1).		D. Conroy (1–2), P. Payne (0–2), C. O'Brien (0–1), B. Delaney (0–1).

Nowlan Park, Kilkenny
Referee: P. Johnston (Kilkenny)

July 2, 1967
Semi-Final

Kilkenny	6–10 – 1–5	Dublin
J. Lynch (4–0), E. Keher (1–7), D. Blanchfield (1–1), J. Bennett (0–1), T. Walsh (0–1).		D. Foley (1–1), E. Flynn (0–3), H. Dalton (0–1).

Dr. Cullen Park, Carlow
Referee: M. Spain (Offaly)

July 16, 1967
Final

Kilkenny	4–10 – 1–12	Wexford
E. Keher (2–5), C. Dunne (1–1), J. Bennett (1–0), T. Walsh (0–2), R. Blanchfield (0–2).		P. Lynch (0–7), S. Whelan (1–0), P. Wilson (0–2), J. O'Brien (0–2), D. Quigley (0–1).

Croke Park, Dublin
Attendance: 25,243
Referee: J. Dowling (Offaly)

=== Munster Senior Hurling Championship ===
June 4, 1967
First Round

Waterford	3–10 – 1–8	Cork
J. Kirwan (1–1), V. Connors (1–1), D. Maho (1–1), F. Walsh (0–4), L. Guinan (0–1), N. Power (0–1), T. Cheasty (0–1).		S. Barry (0–5), J. Bennett (1–0), J. O'Halloran (0–1), G. McCarthy (0–1), P. Fitzgerald (0–1).

Walsh Park, Waterford
Referee: S. Moloney (Tipperary)

June 11, 1967
First Round

Clare	3–14 – 2–7	Limerick
P. Cronin (0–10), M. Kane (1–1), P. McNamara (1–0), T. Ryan (1–0), P. Vaughan (0–2), J. Smyth (0–1).		R. Bennis (1–2), P. Murphy (1–1), S. Quaid (0–2), E. Cregan (0–1), E. Grimes (0–1).

Thurles Sportsfield, Thurles
Referee: P. Ryan (Tipperary)

July 2, 1967
Semi-Final

Tipperary	2–16 – 3–3	Waterford
J. McKenna (1–1), S. McLoughlin (1–1), L. Kiely (0–4), D. Nealon (0–3), M. Keating (0–3), M. Roche (0–2), L. Devaney (0–1), T. English (0–1).		F. Walsh (1–1), M. Morrissey (1–0), J. Kirwan (1–0), F. Whelan (0–1), T. Hearne (0–1).

Cork Athletic Grounds, Cork
Referee: P. Cronin (Cork)

July 9, 1967
Semi-Final

Clare	3–13 – 1–11	Galway
P. Cronin (1–5), N. Jordan (1–1), M. Keane (1–0), J. Smyth (1–0), N. Pyne (0–2), P. Vaughan (0–2), L. Danaher (0–1), T. Ryan (0–1).		P. Fahy (0–7), J. Connolly (1–0), S. Coen (0–1), M. Fox (0–1), P. J. Qualter (0–1), D. Coen (0–1).

Cusack Park, Ennis
Referee: G. Fitzgerald (Limerick)

July 30, 1967
Final

Tipperary	4–12 – 2–6	Clare
M. Keating (3–2), J. Flanagan (1–2), D. Nealon (0–4), L. Devaney (0–3), M. Roche (0–1).		P. Cronin (1–3), J. Smyth (1–1), N. Jordan (0–1), M. Keane (0–1).

Gaelic Grounds, Limerick
Referee: P. Cronin (Cork)

=== All-Ireland Senior Hurling Championship ===
September 3, 1967
Final

Kilkenny	3–8 – 2–7	Tipperary
T. Walsh (1–2), P. Moran (1–0), M. Brennan (1–0), E. Keher (0–3), C. Dunne (0–2), R. Blanchfield (0–1).		D. Nealon (2–0), Jimmy Doyle (0–5), M. Roche (0–2).

Croke Park, Dublin
Attendance: 64,241
Referee: M. Hayes (Clare)

Kilkenny	Tipperary

== Top scorers ==
=== Season ===
Rank	Player	County	Tally	Total	Matches	Average
1	Eddie Keher	Kilkenny	3–15	24	3	8.00
1	Pat Cronin	Clare	2–18	24	3	8.00
3	Paul Lynch	Wexford	2–9	15	2	7.50
4	Michael Keating	Tipperary	3–5	14	3	4.66
4	Tommy Ring	Westmeath	1–11	14	2	7.00
6	Donie Nealon	Tipperary	2–7	13	3	4.33
7	Jim Lynch	Kilkenny	4–0	12	3	4.00
8	Paddy Molloy	Offaly	2–5	11	1	11.00
9	Joe Walsh	Westmeath	2–3	9	2	4.50
9	Christy O'Brien	Laois	1–6	9	2	4.50

=== Single game ===
Rank	Player	County	Tally	Total	Opposition
1	Jim Lynch	Kilkenny	4–0	12	Dublin
2	Michael Keating	Tipperary	3–2	11	Clare
2	Eddie Keher	Kilkenny	2–5	11	Wexford
2	Paddy Molloy	Offaly	2–5	11	Westmeath
5	Eddie Keher	Kilkenny	1–7	10	Dublin
5	Pat Cronin	Clare	0–10	10	Tipperary
7	Paul Lynch	Wexford	2–2	8	Laois
7	Tommy Ring	Westmeath	1–5	8	Offaly
7	Christy O'Brien	Laois	1–5	8	Westmeath
7	Pat Cronin	Clare	1–5	8	Galway
