= 1963 All-Ireland Senior Hurling Championship =

Championship details
- Dates: 12 May – 1 September 1963
- Teams: 11

All-Ireland champions
- Winning team: Kilkenny (15th win)
- Captain: Séamus Cleere

All-Ireland Finalists
- Losing team: Waterford
- Captain: Joe Condon

Provincial champions
- Munster: Waterford
- Leinster: Kilkenny
- Ulster: Not Played
- Connacht: Not Played

Championship statistics
- No. matches played: 10
- Top Scorer: Eddie Keher (2–24)
- Player of the Year: Séamus Cleere
- All-Star Team: See here

The All-Ireland Senior Hurling Championship of 1963 was the 77th staging of Ireland's premier hurling knock-out competition. Kilkenny won the championship, beating Waterford 4–17 to 6–8 in the final at Croke Park, Dublin.

== The championship ==
=== Format ===
==== Munster Championship ====
First round: (2 matches) These are two matches between the first four teams drawn from the province of Munster. Two teams are eliminated at this stage while the two winners advance to the semi-finals.

Semi-finals: (2 matches) The winners of the two first round games join the other two Munster teams to make up the semi-final pairings. Two teams are eliminated at this stage while the winners advance to the final.

Final: (1 match) The winner of the two semi-finals contest this game. One team is eliminated at this stage while the winners advance to the All-Ireland final.

==== Leinster Championship ====
First round: (1 match) This is a single match between the first two teams drawn from the province of Leinster. One team is eliminated at this stage while the winners advance to the semi-finals.

Semi-finals: (2 matches) The winner of the first round joins the other three Leinster teams to make up the semi-final pairings. Two teams are eliminated at this stage while the winners advance to the final.

Final: (1 match) The winner of the two semi-finals contest this game. One team is eliminated at this stage while the winners advance to the All-Ireland final.

==== All-Ireland Championship ====
Final: (1 match) The champions of Munster and Leinster contest this game.

== Results ==
=== Leinster Senior Hurling Championship ===
April 28
First round

Carlow	5–5 – 3–7	Offaly
W. Hogan (3–1), W. Walsh (1–0), P. Hickey (1–0), M. Morrissey (0–1), P. Freaney (0–1), M. O'Brien (0–1), L. Walsh (0–1).		P. Molloy (2–1), E. Fox (1–1), M. Green (0–1), G. Kirwan (0–1), A. Hoctor (0–1), A. Dooley (0–1), B. Loughnane (0–1).

O'Moore Park, Portlaoise
Referee: J. Hatton (Wicklow)

May 12
Quarter-final

Carlow	3–8 – 2–3	Westmeath
L. Walsh (0–5), J. McCarthy (1–1), W. Walsh (1–1), R. Hickey (1–0), W. Hogan (0–1).		T. Ring (1–1), J. Rooney (1–0), J. Carey (0–2).

O'Moore Park, Portlaoise
Referee: T. Coleman (Laois)

June 30
Semi-Final

Dublin	3–12 – 3–5	Carlow
F. Whelan (1–5), M. Kennedy (1–4), M. Bermingham (1–1), W. Jackson (0–1), M. Hayes (0–1).		W. Walsh (2–3), W. Hogan (1–1), P. O'Connell (0–1).

Nowlan Park, Kilkenny
Referee: E. Kelly (Laois)

July 7
Semi-Final

Kilkenny	4–9 – 3–8	Wexford
E. Keher (2–5), T. Walsh (1–0), T. Murphy (1–0), S. Cleere (0–3), T. Kelly (0–1).		O. McGrath (1–2), J. O'Brien (1–1), A. Quirke (1–0), P. Lynch (0–3), N. Wheeler (0–1), P. Wilson (0–1).

Croke Park, Dublin
Referee: J. Hatton (Wicklow)

July 21
Final

Kilkenny	2–10 – 0–9	Dublin
E. Keher (0–5), S. Clohessy (1–1), J. McGovern (1–0), W. O'Dwyer (0–1), A. Kelly (0–1), P. Moran (0–1).		M. Bermingham (0–5), M. Kennedy (0–2), F. Whelan (0–1), D. Ferguson (0–1).

Croke Park, Dublin
Attendance: 33,438
Referee: T. Coleman (Laois)

First round
Carlow	5–5
Offaly	3–7

Quarter-final
Carlow	3–8
Westmeath	2–3

Semi-finals
Kilkenny	4–9
Wexford	3–8
Dublin	3–12
Carlow	3–5

Leinster final
Kilkenny	2–10
Dublin	0–9

=== Munster Senior Hurling Championship ===
May 26
Quarter-final

Cork	4–15 – 2–11	Clare
R. Browne (3–0), M. Mortell (0–6), P. Harte (0–4), J. Barry (1–0), T. Corbett (0–3), N. Gallagher (0–2),		J. Smyth (1–7), M. O'Shea (1–3), N. Jordan (0–1).

Thurles Sportsfield, Thurles

June 9
Quarter-final

Limerick	3–9 – 2–7	Galway
T. McGarry (1–1), M. O'Brien (1–0), T. Bluett (1–0), P. Cobb (0–3), P. J. Keane (0–2), B. Hartigan (0–2), L. Hogan (0–1).		S. Murray (1–1), J. Murray (1–0), M. Cullinane (0–3), T. Sweeney (0–2), J. Conroy (0–1).

Cusack Park, Ennis
Attendance: 10,000

June 30
Semi-Final

Tipperary	4–7 – 1–11	Cork
S. McLoughlin (3–0), J. McKenna (1–0), Jimmy Doyle (0–3), L. Kiely (0–1), T. Ryan (0–1), T. English (0–1), D. Nealon (0–1).		P. Harte (0–6), P. Barry (1–0), M. Mortell (0–2), R. Browne (0–2), C. O'Shea (0–1).

Gaelic Grounds, Limerick
Attendance: 30,000
Referee: S. Power (Waterford)

July 7
Semi-Final

Waterford	2–15 – 3–6	Limerick
P. Grimes (1–3), J. Barron (1–0), S. Power (0–3), M. Flanelly (0–3), J. Meaney (0–2), F. Walsh (0–2), J. Condon (0–1), M. Óg Morrissey (0–1).		T. Bluett (2–0), M. O'Brien (1–0), M. Tynan (0–2), T. McGarry (0–2), M. Rainford (0–1), K. Long (0–1).

Cork Athletic Grounds, Cork
Attendance: 24,000

July 28
Final

Waterford	0–11 – 0–8	Tipperary
P. Grimes (0–8), J. Condon (0–1), F. Walsh (0–1), S. Power (0–1).		Jimmy Doyle (0–4), T. English (0–1), L. Deveaney (0–1), L. Kiely (0–1), D. Nealon (0–1).

Gaelic Grounds, Limerick
Attendance: 36,000
Referee: G. FitzGerald (Limerick)

Quarter-finals
Limerick	3–9
Galway	2–7
Cork	4–15
Clare	2–11

Semi-finals
Waterford	2–15
Limerick	3–6
Tipperary	4–7
Cork	1–11

Munster final
Waterford	0–11
Tipperary	0–8

=== All-Ireland Senior Hurling Championship ===
September 1
Final

Kilkenny	4–17 – 6–8	Waterford
E. Keher (0–14), T. Murphy (2–1), T. Walsh (2–0), S. Cleere (0–2).		S. Power (3–0), P. GRimes (1–4), M. Flanelly (2–0), F. Walsh (0–2), M. Dempsey (0–1), J. Condon (0–1).

Croke Park, Dublin
Attendance: 73,123
Referee: J. Hatton (Wicklow)

== Championship statistics ==
=== Miscellaneous ===
- Waterford's Munster final victory was their last until 2002.
- The All-Ireland final was Waterford's ninth time playing at Croke Park. It would be 1998 before the team returned to the stadium for an All-Ireland semi-final against Kilkenny. It would be 2008 before Waterford played in another All-Ireland final where, once again, the opposition turned out to be Kilkenny.

== Top scorers ==
=== Season ===
Rank	Player	County	Tally	Total	Matches	Average
1	Eddie Keher	Kilkenny	2–24	30	3	10.00
2	Philly Grimes	Waterford	2–15	21	3	7.00
3	Willie Walsh	Carlow	4-04	16	3	5.33
4	Willie Hogan	Carlow	4-03	15	3	5.00
5	Séamus Power	Waterford	3-04	13	3	4.33

=== Single game ===
Rank	Player	County	Tally	Total	Opposition
1	Eddie Keher	Kilkenny	0–14	14	Waterford
2	Eddie Keher	Kilkenny	2–5	11	Wexford
3	Willie Hogan	Carlow	3–1	10	Offaly
3	Jimmy Smyth	Clare	1–7	10	Cork
4	Richie Browne	Cork	3–0	9	Clare
4	Seán McLoughlin	Tipperary	3–0	9	Waterford
4	Séamus Power	Waterford	3–0	9	Kilkenny
4	Willie Walsh	Carlow	2–3	9	Dublin
8	Fran Whelan	Dublin	1–5	8	Carlow
8	Philly Grimes	Waterford	0–8	8	Tipperary
