= 1887 Kilkenny Senior Hurling Championship =

Annual hurling competition season

- Dates: 3 April 1887 – 17 April 1887
- Teams: 4
- Champions: Tullaroan (1st title); James Grace (captain)
- Runners-up: Mooncoin; John Quinn (captain)

Tournament statistics
- Matches played: 3
- Goals scored: 11 (3.67 per match)
- Points scored: 18 (6 per match)

The 1887 Kilkenny Senior Hurling Championship was the inaugural staging of the Kilkenny Senior Hurling Championship since its establishment by the Kilkenny County Board. The championship began on 3 April 1887 and ended on 17 April 1887.

On 17 April 1887, Tullaroan won the championship after a 1–01 to 0–04 defeat of Mooncoin in the final. It was the first of 20 championship titles for the Tullaroan club.

== Championship details ==
=== Overview ===
All of the existing clubs within County Kilkenny were invited to participate in the championship, however, at the time hurling had a limited appeal and was confined to small pockets around the county. Just four teams participated: Castlecomer, the Kilkenny Working Men's Club, Mooncoin and Tullaroan.

== Results ==
Semi-finals

3 April 1887 Semi-final	Tullaroan	4-04 - 0-00	Castlecomer	Kilkenny

3 April 1887 Semi-final	Mooncoin	6-13 - 0-00	Kilkenny Working Men's Club	Kilkenny

Final

17 April 1887 Final	Tullaroan	1-01 - 0-04	Mooncoin	Kilkenny
