= 2006–07 All-Ireland Intermediate Club Hurling Championship =

All Ireland Champions
- Winners: Robert Emmetts (1st win)
- Captain: Fergus McMahon
- Manager: Mick O'Dea

All Ireland Runners-up
- Runners-up: Killimordaly
- Captain: Clement Earls
- Manager: Tom Broderick

Provincial Champions
- Munster: Clooney-Quin
- Leinster: Ardclough
- Ulster: Gort na Móna
- Connacht: Killimordaly

Championship Statistics
- Top Scorer: Brian Shally (0-30)

The 2006–07 All-Ireland Intermediate Club Hurling Championship was the third staging of the All-Ireland Intermediate Club Hurling Championship since its establishment by the Gaelic Athletic Association in 2004.

The All-Ireland final was played on 10 March 2007 at Croke Park in Dublin, between Robert Emmetts from London and Killimordaly. Robert Emmetts won the match by 1–14 to 0–08 to become the first London team to win an All-Ireland title.

== Connacht Intermediate Club Hurling Championship ==
=== Connacht final ===
10 December 2006 Final	Killimordaly	3-14 - 1-07	Athleague	Duggan Park
	E Ryan 1-3, C Earls 0-6, J Duane 1-0, Noel Earls 1-0, M Corcoran 0-2, T Madden 0-1, P Madden 0-1, Cathal Daly 0-1.		S O'Brien 1-0, G Fallon 0-3, M Connaughton 0-2, S McGeeney 0-1, C Moran 0-1.

== Leinster Intermediate Club Hurling Championship ==
=== Leinster quarter-finals ===
29 October 2006 Quarter-final	Raharney	4-12 - 4-12	Rathgarogue–Cushinstown	St Loman's Park
	J Shaw 2-5, B McKeogh 1-1, B Smith 0-4, P Greville 1-0, F Boyle 0-2.		O Bolger 1-7, C Whelan 2-0, S Doran 1-0, J Bolger 0-3, P Bolger 0-1, E Murphy 0-1.

4 November 2006 Quarter-final	Carnew Emmets	1-04 - 1-13	Ardclough	Aughrim County Grounds
	E Kennedy 1-0, J Murphy 0-3, E Hyland 0-1.		R O'Malley 1-1, B Byrne 0-3, B Coulston 0-3, M Ryan 0-3, R Hoban 0-2, C Buggy 0-1.

4 November 2006 Quarter-final replay	Rathgarogue–Cushinstown	3-08 - 3-11	Raharney	O'Kennedy Park
	O Bolger 1-4, J Bolger 1-1, P Bolger 1-0, E Whelan 0-1, D Kent 0-1, C Whelan 0-1.		P Greville 1-5, N Flanagan 2-1, B Smith 0-2, C Flanagan 0-2, D Flanagan 0-1.

=== Leinster semi-finals ===
12 November 2006 Semi-final	Raharney	2-09 - 1-11	Mullinavat	St Loman's Park
	B Connaughton 1-1, F Boyle 1-0, B Smith 0-3, J Shaw 0-3, B McKeogh 0-2.		W O'Dwyer 1-2, M Murphy 0-5, P Aylward 0-1, D Butler 0-1, N Anthony 0-1, P Raftice 0-1.

12 November 2006 Semi-final	Ardclough	1-15 - 1-04	Rathmolyon	Conneff Park
	T Spain 1-3, B Coulson 0-6, B Byrne 0-2, A Whelan 0-2, C Buggy 0-1, R Hoban 0-1.		J Farrell 1-1, G Cole 0-2, M Cole 0-1,

=== Leinster final ===
19 November 2006 Final	Raharney	2-04 - 2-06	Ardclough	St Loman's Park
	J Shaw 1-1, B Connaughton 1-0, P Greville 0-1, B McKeogh 0-1.		A Whelan 0-4, R Hoban 1-0, R O'Malley 1-0, M Ryan 0-2.

== Munster Intermediate Club Hurling Championship ==
=== Munster quarter-final ===
12 November 2006 Quarter-final	Éire Óg Annacarty	1-11 - 3-15	Clooney-Quin	Seán Treacy Park
	D O'Brien 1-4, C O'Brien 0-3, R O'Brien 0-2, J Quinn 0-1, J Kelly 0-1.		B Shally 0-9, C Egan 2-1, M Duggan 1-2, S Conheady 0-1, A Fleming 0-1, R Gallagher 0-1.	Referee: C McAllister (Cork)

=== Munster semi-finals ===
26 November 2006 Semi-final	Clooney-Quin	1-13 - 1-10	Clonea	Cusack Park
	B Shally 0-6, F Lynch 0-4, R Gallagher 1-0, A Fleming 0-1, M Duggan 0-1, C Harrison 0-1.		F Halpin 1-1, M Whelan 0-3, P Power 0-2, A Power 0-1, D Ellis 0-1, M Meara 0-1, R power 0-1.

26 November 2006 Semi-final	Bishopstown	2-17 - 1-15	Claughaun	Páirc Uí Chaoimh
	R Conway 1-4, P Cronin 0-6, J Murphy 1-2, S O'Neill 0-1, T Murray 0-1, D O'Mahony 0-1, M Power 0-1, R McDonnell 0-1.		D Loughrey 0-5, L O'Connor 1-0, I McNamara 0-3, E Harty 0-2, K Holmes 0-2, P McGarry 0-1, S Mullally 0-1.	Referee: A Heagney (Clare)

=== Munster final ===
16 December 2006 Final	Clooney-Quin	0-14 - 1-08	Bishopstown	Gaelic Grounds
	B Shally 0-8, F Lynch 0-4, R Gallagher 0-2.		R Conway 1-2, P Crowley 0-3, J Murphy 0-1, S O'Neill 0-1, K O'Halloran 0-1.

== Ulster Intermediate Club Hurling Championship ==
=== Ulster final ===
5 November 2006 Final	Gort na Móna	4-07 - 2-08	Liatroim Fontenoys	St Tiernach's Park

== All-Ireland Intermediate Club Hurling Championship ==
=== All-Ireland quarter-final ===
17 December 2006 Quarter-final	Ardclough	2-11 - 2-14 (aet)	Robert Emmetts	St Conleth's Park
	P Fitzgerald 2-0, A Whelan 0-3, T Spain 0-3, B Byrne 0-2, R Hoban 0-1, C Buggy 0-1, M Ryan 0-1.		M Traynor 2-7, E Carey 0-2, S Quinn 0-2, J Ryan 0-1, S Kelly 0-1, F McMahon 0-1.

=== All-Ireland semi-finals ===
11 February 2007 Semi-final	Killimordaly	0-13 - 0-11	Gort na Móna	Páirc Tailteann
	C Earls 0-4, E Ryan 0-3, J Duane 0-2, G Earls 0-1, N Earls 0-1, T Madden 0-1, A Lawless 0-1.		B Quinn 0-6, P McCaffrey 0-2, M Ward 0-1, E Colgannon 0-1, C Keenan 0-1.

11 February 2007 Semi-final	Clooney-Quin	1-12 - 3-07	Robert Emmetts	Gaelic Grounds
	B Shally 0-7, F Lynch 1-2, M Duggan 0-1, E Harrison 0-1, D Ryan 0-1.	Report	J Quinlan 1-6, K McMullen 1-0, J Ryan 1-0, E Carey 0-1.

=== All-Ireland final ===
10 March 2007 Final	Robert Emmetts	1–14 – 0–08	Killimordaly	Croke Park
	J Quinlan 0-8 (5f), J Ryan 1-1, T O'Callaghan 0-3, O Kennedy, S Kelly 0-1 each.	Report	C Earls 0-4 (4f), N Earls 0-3 (2f, 1 '65'), E Ryan 0-1 (1f).

== Championship statistics ==
=== Top scorers ===
Rank	Player	Club	Tally	Total	Matches	Average
1	Brian Shally	Cooney-Quin	0-30	30	4	7.50
2	John Shaw	Raharney	3-09	18	3	6.00
3	Ollie Bolger	Rathgarogue–Cushinstown	2-11	17	2	8.50
3	John Quinlan	Robert Emmetts	1-14	17	3	5.66

=== Miscellaneous ===
- Robert Emmetts became the first London-based club to win an All-Ireland title in any grade of hurling.
