= Joe Jordan (hurler) =

Irish hurler

Personal information
- Native name: Seosamh Mac Shiúrtáin (Irish)
- Born: 1987 (age 38–39) Blarney, County Cork, Ireland

Sport
- Sport: Hurling
- Position: Right wing-back
Clubs
- Years: Club
- Blarney; Muskerry
Club titles
- Cork titles: 0
College
- Years: College
- University College Cork
College titles
- Fitzgibbon titles: 1
Inter-county*
Years	County	Apps (scores)
2009	Cork	0 (0-00)
Inter-county titles
- Munster titles: 0
- All-Irelands: 0
- NHL: 0
- All Stars: 0
- *Inter County team apps and scores correct as of 20:17, 25 March 2019.

Joseph Jordan (born 1987) is an Irish hurler who plays for Cork Premier Championship club Blarney. He played for the Cork senior hurling team for one season, during which time he usually lined out as a right wing-back.

Jordan began his hurling career at club level with Blarney. After breaking onto the club's top adult team he had one of his greatest successes as right wing-back on Blarney's All-Ireland Intermediate Club Championship-winning team in 2009. He was also selected for University College Cork, with whom he won a Fitzgibbon Cup title in 2009, and the Muskerry divisional team.

At inter-county level, Jordan was part of the Cork minor team that won the Munster Championship in 2005 before later winning an All-Ireland Championship with the intermediate team in 2009. He also joined the Cork senior team in 2009. Jordan was an unused substitute before leaving the panel at the end of the season.

== Career statistics ==
Team	Year	National League			Munster		All-Ireland		Total	
Team	Year	Division	Apps	Score	Apps	Score	Apps	Score	Apps	Score
Cork	2009	Division 1A	0	0-00	0	0-00	0	0-00	0	0-00
Career total			0	0-00	0	0-00	0	0-00	0	0-00

== Honours ==
University College Cork

- Fitzgibbon Cup (1): 2009

Blarney

- All-Ireland Intermediate Club Hurling Championship (1): 2009
- Munster Intermediate Club Hurling Championship (1): 2009
- Cork Premier Intermediate Hurling Championship (1): 2008

Cork

- All-Ireland Intermediate Hurling Championship (1): 2009
- Munster Intermediate Hurling Championship (1): 2009
- Munster Minor Hurling Championship (1): 2005
