= 2026–27 All-Ireland Intermediate Club Hurling Championship =

All-Ireland inter-county competition for intermediate clubs

Championship Details
- Dates: 24 October 2026 – January 2027
- Teams: 27

All Ireland Champions

Provincial Champions
- Munster: Not Played
- Leinster: Not Played
- Ulster: Not Played
- Connacht: Tooreen

Championship Statistics
- Matches Played: 20
- Total Goals: 45
- Total Points: 665
- Top Scorer: Conor Corvan (2–22)

The 2026–27 All-Ireland Intermediate Club Hurling Championship is the 22nd staging of the All-Ireland Intermediate Club Hurling Championship, the Gaelic Athletic Association's intermediate inter-county club hurling tournament. The championship is scheduled to run from 24 October 2026 to January 2027.

== Format ==
Several Irish counties play a county hurling championship, with one club progressing to the All-Ireland Intermediate Club Hurling Championship. This includes the top-ranked competition (senior county championship) in several mid-ranked hurling counties, and the second-ranked competition (called Senior B, Intermediate or Premier Intermediate) in the top hurling counties.

Each province plays their own championship (all being straight knockout) with the four provincial champions qualifying for the All-Ireland Intermediate semi-finals. The London champions play in the Connacht championship.

The senior champions of the top hurling counties play in the 2026–27 All-Ireland Senior Club Hurling Championship. Other lower-ranked county winners play in the 2026–27 All-Ireland Junior Club Hurling Championship.

== Team summaries ==
Team	Championship	Most recent success		
Team	Championship	All-Ireland	Provincial	County
Abbeydorney	Kerry SHC	—	—	2025
Ballincollig	Cork PIHC	—	—	—
Brothers Pearse	London SHC	—	—	2023
Carlow Town	Carlow IHC	—	—	2013
Carnew Emmets	Wicklow SHC	—	—	2025
Castleblayney	Monaghan SHC	—	—	2025
Castletown	Laois PIHC	—	—	—
Clarecastle	Clare PIHC	—	—	1931
Clashmore–Kinsalebeg	Waterford PIHC	—	—	—
Clodiagh Gaels	Offaly SBHC	—	—	2021
Cloughbawn	Wexford IHC	—	—	1973
Dromin/Athlacca	Limerick PIHC	—	—	2023
Eoghan Ruadh	Tyrone SHC	—	—	2019
Fingallians	Dublin IHC	—	—	2023
Four Roads	Roscommon SHC	—	—	2025
James Stephens	Kilkenny IHC	—	—	—
Keady Lámh Dhearg	Armagh SHC	—	2007	2018
Kilmessan	Meath SHC	—	—	2013
Lavey	Derry IHC	—	—	2010
Lisbellaw St Patrick's	Fermanagh SHC	—	2012	2013
Newry Shamrocks	Down IHC	—	—	2021
Robert Emmets	Antrim IHC	—	—	2007
St Eunan's	Donegal SHC	—	—	2001
St Mary's	Tipperary PIHC	—	—	—
St Oliver Plunkett's	Westmeath SBHC	—	—	2023
Tooreen	Mayo SHC	—	2025	2025

== Connacht Intermediate Club Hurling Championship ==
=== Connacht quarter-final ===
31 October 2026 Quarter-final	Four Roads (Roscommon)	0-14 - 5-36	Tooreen (Mayo)	King & Moffatt Dr Hyde Park
	C Morris 0-6, T Morris 0-2, O Finneran 0-2, A Donnelly 0-1, L Óg Coyle 0-1, Cormac Mulry 0-1, R Coyle 0-1.	Report	E Delaney 3-4, F Boland 0-7, S Boland 0-7, D Delaney 1-2, L Lavin 0-4, D Huane 0-4, S Kenny 1-0, O Greally 0-3, S Coyne 0-2, F Delaney 0-1, C Freeman 0-1, D Harrison 0-1.

=== Connacht semi-finals ===
8 November 2026 Semi-final	Brothers Pearse (London)	1-14 - 3-32	Tooreen (Mayo)	Connacht GAA Centre
	P Kennedy 0-10, M Garvey 1-0, M Kilgannon 0-2, O Shiel 0-1, A O'Brien 0-1.	Report	F Delaney 2-1, F Boland 0-7, L Lavin 1-3, E Delaney 0-4, S Boland 0-4, J Boyle 0-3, D Huane 0-3, S Kenny 0-2, B Morley 0-2, C Freeman 0-1, B Douglas 0-1, O Greally 0-1.

=== Connacht final ===
21 November 2026 Final	Kilconieron (Galway)	0-12 - 0-15	Tooreen (Mayo)	King & Moffatt Dr Hyde Park
		Report	S Boland 0-7, F Boland 0-3, O Greally 0-1, L Lavin 0-1, B Morley 0-1, E Delaney 0-1, S Kenny 0-1.

== Leinster Intermediate Club Hurling Championship ==
=== Leinster first round ===
24 October 2026 First round	Clodiagh Gaels (Offaly)	0-11 - 1-11	Carnew Emmets (Wicklow)	Glenisk O'Connor Park
	L Langton 0-7 (7f), J Keenaghan and C Brady 0-2 each.	Report	P Doran 0-5 (2f and 1 '65'), T Brennan 1-2, F Darcy 0-2, D Redmond and T Collins 0-1 each.

=== Leinster quarter-finals ===
7 November 2026 Quarter-final	Kilmessan (Meath)	1-20 - 2-19	Castletown (Laois)	St Loman's Park
	S Doyle 1-6 (0-4 frees), L Byrne, K Gorman and W Byrne 0-3 each, J Cottrell 0-2, M Horan, F Conroy and L O’Connor 0-1 each.	Report	K Cuddy 1-5 (0-5 frees), J Breen 0-6, T Og Phelan 1-2 (0-1 free), C Phelan 0-2, C Walsh, M Phelan, C Doran and R Mullaney 0-1 each.

7 November 2026 Quarter-final	Carlow Town (Carlow)	2-06 - 1-14	St Oliver Plunkett's (Westmeath)	Netwatch Cullen Park
	K English 1-4 (1-0 pen, 0-4f), M E Hayden 1-0, B Cassidy, P Lynch 0-1 each.	Report	P Casey 1-9 (1-7f, 0-1'65), P Lynam 0-2, T Meehan, C Craig, S Hayes 0-1 each.

7 November 2026 Quarter-final	Fingallians (Dublin)	2-16 - 1-18	Carnew Emmets (Wicklow)	Parnell Park
	E O’Connor 0-9 (7f); O Johnston 1-2; H Brogan 1-1; D King, C Clarke, M Rock, A Gargan 0-1 apiece.	Report	F D’Arcy 0-8 (4f); T Brennan 1-1; P Doran 0-3 (3f); W Kinsella, D Redmond 0-2 each; R Stokes, J Doyle 0-1 apiece.

8 November 2026 Quarter-final	James Stephens (Kilkenny)	0-20 - 1-13	Cloughbawn (Wexford)	UPMC Nowlan Park
	C Kenny (0-6f); E McDermott (0-4); T O’Dwyer (0-3f); L Scanlon, C Heffernan, S Manogue (0-2); E Lauhoff (0-1).	Report	C Flood (1-5); B Carton, S Kehoe (0-2 each); B Whitty (0-2f), L Flood, H Kehoe (0-1 each).

=== Leinster semi-finals ===
21 November 2026 Semi-final	St Oliver Plunkett's (Westmeath)	2-12 - 3-17	Castletown (Laois)	TEG Cusack Park
	P Casey 0-10 (0-8 frees), T Meehan and M Cunningham 1-0 each, S Hayes and E Meehan 0-1 each.	Report	M Phelan 2-1, T Og Phelan 0-6 (0-2 65s, 0-1 free), A Phelan 1-2, T Cuddy, C Walsh and J Breen 0-2 each, R Mullaney and K Cuddy (free) 0-1 each.	Referee: Kyle Waters

21 November 2026 Semi-final	James Stephens (Kilkenny)	5-20 - 0-12	Fingallians (Dublin)	UPMC Nowlan Park
	L Scanlon (1-5); C Kenny (0-7, 2fs); T O’Dwyer (1-1, 1f); W Spencer (1-1); E Guifoyle, S Manogue (1-0 each); E Lauhoff (0-3); B McDermott (0-2); C Heffernan (0-1)	Report	E O’Connor (0-5, 4fs); D Power (0-2, 1 ‘65); M Rock, L Hayward, O Johnston, A Gargan, H Brogan (0-1 each)	Referee: Colin Bailey

=== Leinster final ===
5/6 December 2026 Final	Castletown (Laois)	v	James Stephens (Kilkenny)

== Munster Intermediate Club Hurling Championship ==
The draw for the Munster Club Championship took place on 31 July 2026.

=== Munster quarter-finals ===
1 November 2026 Quarter-final	St Mary's (Tipperary)	1-16 - 0-15	Ballincollig (Cork)	Clonmel Sportsfield
	P McGarry 0-9 (0-5 f), T Condon 1-0, T Charles 0-3, S Kennedy 0-2, H Lawlor, A Cagney 0-1.	Report	C O’Driscoll, J Dwyer, T O’Connell, S Wills (0-1 f), Danny Miskella 0-2 each, Theo Morgan, D O’Mahony, B Keating, C Dalton, R O’Donovan 0-1 each.

1 November 2026 Quarter-final	Clashmore–Kinsalebeg (Waterford)	1-19 - 3-14 (aet)	Abbeydorney (Kerry)	Cappoquin Logistics Fraher Field
	D Ryan (0-6; 0-6f); B Lynch (1-1); P O’Connor (0-4; 0-2f); T de Burca (0-3; 0-2 ‘65; 0-1f); J Fitzgerald, E O’Halloran, C Ryan, B O’Halloran and S Coughlan (0-1 each).	Report	M O’Leary (1-7; 0-5f); O Maunsell and M Slattery (1-0 each); M Clifford (0-3); N O’Mahoney (0-2); D Hogan and K Varian (0-1 each).

=== Munster semi-finals ===
15 November 2026 Semi-final	Abbeydorney (Kerry)	0-12 - 2-24	St Mary's (Tipperary)	Austin Stack Park
	M O’Leary 0-5 (0-2fs), O Maunsell 0-3, M Slattery, J Sheehan, D Egan, J Hannon 0-1 each.	Report	P McGarry 1-7 (0-6fs, 1-0pen), J Higgins 1-2, C Deely 0-3, A Cagney, M Murphy, J Morris, T Charles 0-2 each, H Lawlor, T Condon, Seamus Kennedy, R Peters 0-1 each.	Referee: S Scanlon (Cork)

15 November 2026 Semi-final	Dromin/Athlacca (Limerick)	1-20 - 0-22	Clarecastle (Clare)	TUS Gaelic Grounds
	D Reidy 0-10 (7f, 1 65); J Fitzgibbon 1-3; C Scully 0-3; D Breen 0-2; S Fitzgibbon, T Boddy 0-1 each.	Report	C Galvin 0-6 (4f, 1 65); P O’Connell 0-6 (0-4f); J Doherty 0-4; H Doherty 0-2; A Hayes, C Whelan, C Brigdale, C Ralph 0-1 each.	Referee: C O’Donovan (Tipperary)

=== Munster final ===
29 November 2026 Final	St Mary's (Tipperary)	v	Dromin/Athlacca (Limerick)

== Ulster Intermediate Club Hurling Championship ==
The draw for the Ulster Club Championship took place in August 2026.

=== Ulster quarter-finals ===
31 October 2026 Quarter-final	Robert Emmets Cushendun (Antrim)	1-15 - 0-13	Lavey (Derry)	Glen Rovers GAC Armoy Grounds
	C McNeill 0-5 (4f); C McHugh 0-3 (3f); S McKay 1-1; H Kilgore 0-3; C Kilgore 0-1; F McQuillan 0-1; J McKay 0-1	Report	F Bradley 0-4 (3f); R Collins 0-3 (3f); S Melaugh 0-2; C Melaugh 0-1; R Duggan 0-1; J McGurk 0-1; S Dodds 0-1

1 November 2026 Quarter-final	Lisbellaw (Fermanagh)	1-17 - 0-18	Eoghan Ruadh (Tyrone)	Brewster Park
	J Duffy 0-9 (5f0, Caolan Duffy 1-2, S Corrigan 0-2, F McBrien 0-1, A McShea 0-1, T Keenan 0-1, D Teague 0-1.	Report	C Ferguson 0-7 (7f), K Morgan 0-2, C McErlean 0-2, L Hughes 0-2, R Weir 0-2, F Donaghy 0-1, C Bell 0-1, SP McKernan 0-1.

1 November 2026 Quarter-final	St Eunan's (Donegal)	2-15 - 0-16	Castleblayney (Monaghan)	O'Donnell Park
	K Kealy 1-4; P Kelly 0-6,5f,1’65; F Delaney 1-0; C O’Grady, D Horgan, R Forde, B MacIntyre and C O hEarain 0-1 each.	Report	L Moloney 0-8,7f; T Hughes 0-4; D Hughes and P Malone 0-2 each.

1 November 2026 Quarter-final	Newry Shamrocks (Down)	0-12 - 3-22	Keady Lámh Dhearg (Armagh)	Páirc Esler
	J Duggan (0-8, 8f), D Bridges (0-2), S Campbell (0-1), M McKey (0-1).	Report	C Corvan (2-10, 8f), J Shortt (1-1, 1f); O Keenan (0-2), O Fullerton (0-2), S Renaghan (0-2), J Corvan (0-1), S Harvey (0-1), M Toal (0-1), B Molloy (0-1); D Harvey (0-1).

=== Ulster semi-finals ===
15 November 2026 Semi-final	Lisbellaw (Fermanagh)	0-14 - 0-15	St Eunan's (Donegal)	Healy Park
	J Duffy 0-6, 6f; J Tormey 0-2; C Corrigan 0-2; D Flanagan 0-1; S Corrigan 0-1; C Duffy 0-1; A Flanagan 0-1.	Report	P Kelly 0-6, 6f; K Kealy 0-3; B MacIntyre 0-2; C Herron 0-2; R Hilferty 0-1; R Forde 0-1.	Referee: K Parke

15 November 2026 Semi-final	Robert Emmets Cushendun (Antrim)	0-17 - 0-17; Penalties: 1-2	Keady Lámh Dhearg (Armagh)	Dean McGlinchey Park
	C McNeill 0-8 (8F); S McKay 0-2, P Morgan 0-1, C Kilgore 0-1, T Scally 0-1; H Kilgore 0-1, C McHugh 0-1, J McKay 0-1, Conor Bannon 0-1.	Report	C Corvan 0-12 (11F), D Harvey 0-1, O Keenan 0-1, S Harvey 0-1, J Corvan 0-1, S Renaghan 0-1.	Referee: Derek Argue

=== Ulster final ===
29 November 2026 Final	Keady Lámh Dhearg (Armagh)	v	St Eunan's (Donegal)	Killyclogher
1:30PM

== All-Ireland Intermediate Club Hurling Championship ==
=== All-Ireland semi-finals ===
19/20 December 2026 Semi-final	Ulster representatives (Ulster)	v	Leinster representatives (Leinster)

19/20 December 2026 Semi-final	Tooreen (Mayo)	v	Munster representatives (Munster)

=== All-Ireland final ===
16/17 January 2027 Final	v

== Championship statistics ==
=== Top scorers ===
Rank	Player	Club	Tally	Total	Matches	Average
1	Conor Corvan	Keady Lámh Dhearg	2-22	28	2	14.00
2	Pádraig Casey	St Oliver Plunkett's	1-19	22	2	11.00
3	Peter McGarry	St Mary's	1-16	19	2	9.50
4	Eoin Delaney	Tooreen	3-09	18	3	6.00
4	Shane Boland	Tooreen	0-18	18	3	6.00
6	Fergal Boland	Tooreen	0-17	17	3	5.66
7	Michael O'Leary	Abbeydorney	1-12	15	2	7.50
7	John Duffy	Lisbellaw St Patrick's	0-15	15	2	8.50
9	Eoin O'Connor	James Stephens	0-14	14	2	7.00
10	Cian Kenny	James Stephens	0-13	13	2	6.50
10	Connlaoth McNeill	Robert Emmets	0-13	13	2	6.50
