= 2008–09 All-Ireland Intermediate Club Hurling Championship =

Championship Details
- Dates: 12 October 2008 – 21 February 2009
- Teams: 19

All Ireland Champions
- Winners: Blarney (1st win)
- Captain: James Hughes
- Manager: Tadhg Hurley

All Ireland Runners-up
- Runners-up: Cappataggle
- Captain: Michael Broderick
- Manager: Gerry Healy

Provincial Champions
- Munster: Blarney
- Leinster: Kilmessan
- Ulster: Gort na Móna
- Connacht: Cappataggle

Championship Statistics
- Matches Played: 18
- Total Goals: 47 (2.61 per game)
- Total Points: 375 (20.83)
- Top Scorer: Nicky Horan (0-22); Alan Dolan (1-19)

The 2008–09 All-Ireland Intermediate Club Hurling Championship was the fifth staging of the All-Ireland Intermediate Club Hurling Championship since its establishment by the Gaelic Athletic Association in 2004.

The All-Ireland final was played on 21 February 2009 at Croke Park in Dublin, between Blarney from Cork and Cappataggle from Galway. Blarney won the match by 2-14 to 1-12 to claim their first ever All-Ireland title.

Nicky Horan (0-22) and Alan Dolan (1-19) were the championship's top scorers.

== Connacht Intermediate Club Hurling Championship ==
=== Connacht semi-final ===
27 October 2008 Semi-final	Four Roads	2-13 - 2-11 (aet)	Ballyhaunis	Ballyforan Grounds

=== Connacht finals ===
16 November 2008 Final	Cappataggle	0-14 - 2-07	Four Roads	Athleague Grounds
	A Dolan 0-5, J Skehill 0-2, P Dolan 0-2, D Joyce 0-1, D Kenny 0-1, E Malone 0-1, D Byrnes 0-1, D Cormican 0-1.		R Mulry 1-3, R Kennedy 1-0, D Dolan 0-2, J Moran 0-1, T Lennon 0-1.

== Leinster Intermediate Club Hurling Championship ==
=== Leinster quarter-finals ===
2 November 2008 Quarter-final	Erin's Own	2-12 - 2-10	Naomh Bríd	Nowlan Park
	D Fogarty 1-2, D Buggy 0-5, J Byrne 1-1, M Boran 0-2, A Moran 0-1, D Meally 0-1.	Report	B Lawler 0-7, P Hickey 1-1, J Sheehan 1-0, J Kane 0-1, J Kavanagh 0-1.

9 November 2008 Quarter-final	Glenealy	0-09 - 1-09	Confey	Pearse Park
	T Doyle 0-3, L Glynn 0-2, J O'Neill 0-1, A O'Neill 0-1, M O'Neill 0-1, E Glynn 0-1.	Report	O Lynch 0-4, P Keegan 1-0, M Divilly 0-1, P Divilly 0-1, K Divilly 0-1, D Nolan 0-1, M Fennelly 0-1.

=== Leinster semi-finals ===
16 November 2008 Semi-final	Confey	0-08 - 0-17	Kilmessan	Creighton Park
	D Nolan 1-2; O Lynch 0-4, two frees; K Divilly 0-2 frees; M Divilly 0-1.	Report	N Horan 0-7, six frees; G O"Neill 0-4; S Clynch 0-2; P Farrell 0-2; J Keena 0-1; M Doyle 0-1.

16 November 2008 Semi-final	Erin's Own	0-14 - 1-08	Blackwater	Nowlan Park
	D Buggy 0-6, E Brennan 0-2, M Boran 0-2, M Murphy 0-2, M Moran 0-1, D Meally 0-1.	Report	M Lillis 0-5, P O'Leary 1-1, K Murphy 0-1, J O'Leary 0-1.

=== Leinster final ===
26 November 2008 Final	Kilmessan	1-07 - 1-06	Erin's Own	Nowlan Park
	Kilmessan: N Horan 1-3 (3f), G O'Neill 0-2, S Clynch, J Kenna 0-1 each.	Report	M Murphy 1-2, M Boran 0-2 (1f), D Buggy, R Ryan 0-1 each.

== Munster Intermediate Club Hurling Championship ==
=== Munster quarter-finals ===
2 November 2008 Quarter-final	Kilmoyley	0-07 - 3-09	Blarney	Lerrig Grounds
	S Brick 0-3, E Sheehy 0-1, M O'Regan 0-1, M Murnane 0-1, S Young 0-1.		M Cremin 0-5, R McNamara 1-1, C Murphy 1-1, S Murnane 1-0 (og), E Hallahan 0-1, M McCarthy 0-1.	Referee: J O'Mahony (Limerick)

2 November 2008 Quarter-final	Broadford	2-13 - 1-12	Templederry Kenyons	Scariff Grounds
	P Hickey 1-4, Aonghus O'Brien 0-7, D Hickey 1-0, D Teefey 0-1, K Corcoran 0-1.		P O'Leary 1-6, T Minogue 1-2, G Ryan 0-3, P Ryan 0-1.	Referee: D Copps (Cork)

=== Munster semi-finals ===
9 November 2008 Semi-final	Blarney	w/o - scr.	An Rinn

9 November 2008 Semi-final	Broadford	4-13 - 2-13	Bruff	Scariff Grounds
	P Hickey 2-3, N Moloney 1-1, Aonghus O'Brien 0-4, B McMahon 1-0, K Corcoran 0-2, D Teefey 0-1, J Clogan 0-1, Craig Chaplin 0-1.		M O'Hara 1-3, T Burke 1-2, S Bulfin 0-4, P O'LEary 0-3, P Browne 0-1.	Referee: C McAllister (Cork)

=== Munster final ===
23 November 2008 Final	Blarney	2-07 - 0-03	Broadford	Bruff Grounds
	R McNamara 1-4, M Cremin 1-3.		K Corcoran 0-2, A O'Brien 0-1.	Referee: M Wadding (Waterford)

== Ulster Intermediate Club Hurling Championship ==
=== Ulster semi-finals ===
12 October 2008 Semi-final	Liatroim Fontenoys	1-15 - 2-09	Castleblayney	Dungannon Grounds
	P McAleenan 0-6, M McCarten 0-5, D Morgan 1-0, P McCarten 0-3, R Dixon 0-1.		S Lambe 0-5, J McHugh 1-0, B McGuigan 1-0, H Byrne 0-1, J Lacy 0-1, T McKenna 0-1, A Lambe 0-1.

12 October 2008 Semi-final	Gort na Móna	2-07 - 1-10	Éire Óg Carrickmore	Davitt Park
			J Treacy 0-7, G Fox 1-0, S Óg Grogan 0-3.

9 November 2008 Semi-final replay	Gort na Móna	1-14 - 1-10	Éire Óg Carrickmore	Dean McGlinchey Park
	S Kelly 0-6, B Quinn 0-4, D McVeigh 1-0, C McCann 0-1, N Grego 0-1, D McClean 0-1, P McCaffrey 0-1.		J Treacy 0-5, C Slane 0-4, S Óg Grogan 1-0, C McKeever 0-1.

=== Ulster final ===
16 November 2008 Final	Gort na Móna	3-16 - 0-05	Liatroim Fontenoys	Casement Park
	N Grego 2-1.

== All-Ireland Intermediate Club Hurling Championship ==
=== All-Ireland quarter-final ===
20 December 2008 Quarter-final	Gort na Móna	3-07 - 0-10	Robert Emmetts	Casement Park
	P McCaffrey 2-0, C Quinn 1-0, S Kelly 0-3, N Greg0 0-2, D McLean 0-1, B Quinn 0-1.	Report	K McMullen 0-5, J Ryan 0-2, J McCaughan 0-1, T Toomey 0-1, S Quinn 0-1.

=== All-Ireland semi-finals ===
25 January 2009 Semi-final	Blarney	3-10 - 1-08	Gort na Móna	Kinnegad Grounds
	C Murphy 1-1, B Hurley and J O'Sullivan 1-0 each, M Cremin(2f, 1 '65), J Hurley (1f) 0-3 each, J Hughes (f), C O'Shea and M McCarthy 0-1 each.	Report	C Keenan 1-1, B Quinn 0-4 (2 f, 1 '65), S Kelly 0-2, D McLean 0-1.

25 January 2009 Semi-final	Cappataggle	2-13 - 0-17	Kilmesaan	Dr Hyde Park
	A Dolan 0-10 (0-8f), D Joyce 1-1, D Byrnes 1-0, C Cormican, S Creaven 0-1 each.	Report	N Horan 0-9 (0-8f), G O'Neill 0-3, J Keena 0-2, A O'Neill, P Donnelly, S Clynch 0-1 each.

=== All-Ireland final ===
21 February 2009 Final	Blarney	2-14 - 1-12	Cappataggle	Croke Park
	C Murphy 1-9, 0-6 frees, R McNamara 1-1, M McCarthy, S O'Donoghue, E Hallahan and J Hughes 0-1 each.	Report	A Dolan 0-7, 0-5 frees, 0-1 sideline, D Joyce 1-2, 0-2 frees, Michael Broderick, free, P Dolan and D Cormican 0-1 each	Referee: D Connolly (Kilkenny)

== Championship statistics ==
=== Top scorers ===
Rank	Player	Club	Tally	Total	Matches	Average
1	Nicky Horan	Kilmessan	1-19	22	3	7.33
1	Alan Dolan	Cappataggle	0-22	22	3	7.33
3	Colin Murphy	Blarney	3-11	20	4	5.00

=== Miscellaneous ===
- Gort na Móna became the first club to win the Ulster Championship twice.
