= Keith Ryan (hurler) =

Irish hurler (born 2001)

Personal information
- Native name: Ceith Ó Riain (Irish)
- Born: 2001 (age 24–25) Upperchurch; County Tipperary, Ireland
- Occupation: Primary school teacher

Sport
- Sport: Hurling
- Position: Right wing-back
Club
- Years: Club
- 2019–present: Upperchurch–Drombane
Club titles
- Tipperary titles: 0
College
- Years: College
- Mary Immaculate College
College titles
- Fitzgibbon titles: 1
Inter-county*
Years	County	Apps (scores)
2026–	Tipperary	0 (0-00)
Inter-county titles
- Munster titles: 0
- All-Irelands: 0
- NHL: 0
- All Stars: 0
- *Inter County team apps and scores correct as of 10:23, 18 April 2026.

Keith Ryan (born 2001) is an Irish hurler. At club level he plays with Upperchurch–Drombane and at inter-county level with the Tipperary senior hurling team.

== Career ==
Ryan attended Thurles CBS and played in all grades of hurling during his time there. He was a Dean Ryan Cup runner-up in 2017, before later progressing to the school's Dr Harty Cup team. Ryan later studied at Mary Immaculate College in Limerick and was part of their Fitzgibbon Cup-winning team in 2024.

At club level, Ryan first played for Upperchurch–Drombane at juvenile and underage levels before progressing to adult level. He captained the club's interemdiate team to the Tipperary PIHC title in 2025. Ryan subsequently claiemd a Munster Club IHC title before captaining Upperchurch–Drombane to the All-Ireland Club IHC title, following a 4–20 to 2–24 win over Tooreen in the 2026 All-Ireland Club IHC final.

Ryan first appeared on the inter-county scene for Tipperary as a Gaelic footballer with the minor team in 2018. Two years later, he switched to hurling and was part of Tipperary's under-20 team. Ryan made his senior team debut in a National Hurling League game against Limerick in February 2026.

== Career statistics ==
As of 21 March 2026

Team	Year	National League			Munster		All-Ireland		Total	
Team	Year	Division	Apps	Score	Apps	Score	Apps	Score	Apps	Score
Tipperary	2026	Division 1A	1	0-01	0	0-00	0	0-00	1	0-01
Career total			1	0-01	0	0-00	0	0-00	1	0-01

== Honours ==
Mary Immaculate College

- Fitzgibbon Cup (1): 2024

Upperchurch–Drombane

- All-Ireland Intermediate Club Hurling Championship (1) 2025 (c)
- Munster Intermediate Club Hurling Championship (1) 2025 (c)
- Tipperary Premier Intermediate Hurling Championship (1): 2025 (c)
