= Connacht Intermediate Club Hurling Championship =

Hurling competition

- Current season or competition: 2026 Connacht Intermediate Club Hurling Championship
- Irish: Craobh Iománaíochta Idirmheánach Chonnacht na gClub
- Code: Hurling
- Founded: 2005; 21 years ago
- Region: Connacht (GAA)
- No. of teams: 4
- Title holders: Tooreen (7th title)
- Most titles: Tooreen (7 titles)
- Sponsors: Allied Irish Banks
- Official website: Connacht GAA Website

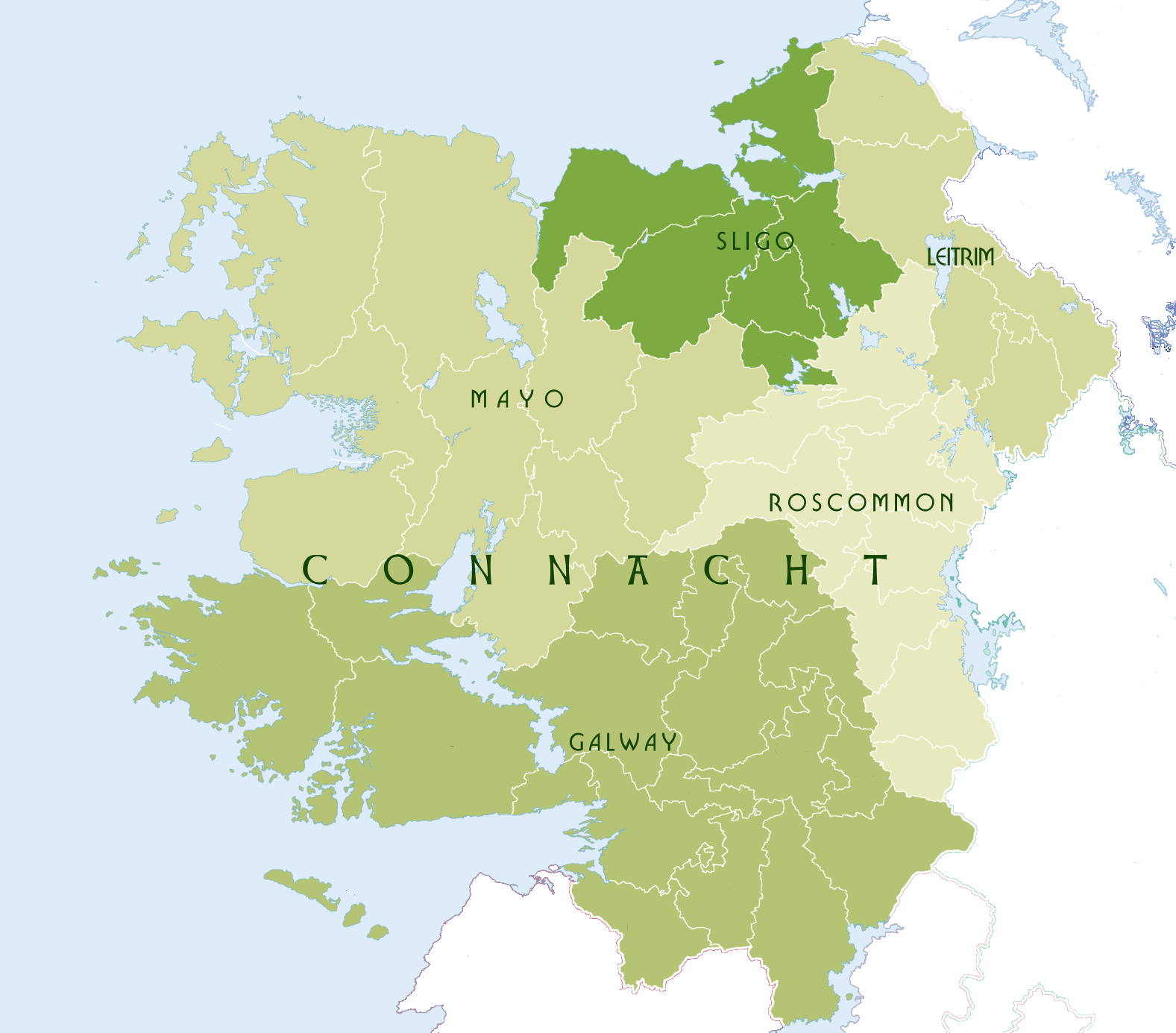
The five counties of Connacht. Each enters one team into the Connacht Club IHC; there is also one from London.

The Connacht Intermediate Club Hurling Championship (abbreviated as the Connacht Club IHC) is an annual club competition in Connacht. The Connacht Intermediate Championship was introduced in 2005 for teams deemed not eligible for the senior grade. It forms second tier of Connacht club hurling. Prior to 2008, county champions competed in the senior grade, but since then the senior champions from Mayo, Roscommon and London (since 2018) compete at intermediate level along with the Galway intermediate champions, who receive a bye to the final.

In its current format, the Connacht Intermediate Championship begins in November following the completion of the four County Championships. The 4 participating teams compete in a single-elimination tournament. The winner of the championship qualifies to the All-Ireland Intermediate Club Hurling Championship.

The competition has been won by 11 teams, 5 of which have won it more than once. Tooreen are the most successful team in the championships history, having won it 7 times.

== History ==
The first Connacht Intermediate Championship was contested in 2005.

Initially, the competition was won by the Galway representatives on each occasion. Since 2017 Mayo club Tooreen won 7 of the 9 championships up to 2026.

Beginning with the 2018 championship, the London champions compete in the competition, entering at the semi-final stage.

== Teams ==
=== Qualification ===
| County | Championship | Qualifying Team |
|---|---|---|
| Galway | Galway Premier Intermediate Hurling Championship | Champion |
| London | London Senior Hurling Championship | Champion |
| Mayo | Mayo Senior Hurling Championship | Champion |
| Roscommon | Roscommon Senior Hurling Championship | Champion |

== Recent championships ==
2026

Quarter-Final
Tooreen | 5-36
Four Roads | 0-14

Semi-final
Tooreen | 3-32
Brothers Pearse | 1-14

Final
Tooreen
Kilconieron

2025

Quarter-Final
Tooreen | 1-17
Four Roads | 1-12

Semi-final
Tooreen | 3-21
St Gabriels (London) | 0-08

Final
Tooreen | 3-21
Meelick-Eyrecourt | 2-12

2024

Quarter-Final
Tooreen | 2-25
Four Roads | 3-12

Semi-final
Tooreen | 1-22
St Gabriels (London) | 1-12

Final
Tynagh-Abbey/Duniry | 0-19
Tooreen | 1-14

2023

Quarter-Final
Tooreen | 2-23
Four Roads | 2-14

Semi-final
Tooreen | w/o
London Champions | scr

Final
Tooreen | 0-21
Ballinderreen | 0-19

2022

Quarter-Final
Tooreen | 2-23
Four Roads | 0-14

Semi-final
Tooreen | 1-17
St Gabriels (London) | 1-12

Final
Tooreen | 0-22
Killimor | 1-15

2021

Quarter-Final
Tooreen | 0-28
Athleague | 2-07

Semi-final
Tooreen | 1-19
Robert Emmetts (London) | 1-12

Final
Tooreen | 1-15
Moycullen | 0-14

2019

Quarter-Final
Tooreen | 0-29
Four Roads | 0-19

Semi-final (AET)
Tooreen | 0-30
Robert Emmetts (London) | 1-23

Final
Tooreen | 0-21
Kinvara | 2-10

2018

Quarter-final
Tooreen | 0-17
Athleague | 1-9

Semi-final
Tooreen | 0-18
St Gabriels (London) | 1-13

Final
Oranmore-Maree GAA | 1-20
Tooreen | 1-15

2017

| Semi-final | | Final |
| Padraig Pearses | 1-11 |
| Tooreen | 1-21 |
| Tooreen | 1-21 | Tooreen | 1-15 |
| | | Ballinderreen | 1-11 |

2016

| Semi-final | | Final |
| Ballyhaunis | 1-12 |
| Oran | 0-8 |
| Oran | 0-8 | Ahascragh-Fohenagh | 0-19; 2-20 |
| | | Ballyhaunis | 2-13; 0-13 |

2015

| Semi-final | | Final |
| Four Roads | 3-9 |
| Ballyhaunis | 1-12 |
| Ballyhaunis | 1-12 | Abbeyknockmoy | 1-11 |
| | | Four Roads | 0-11 |

2014

| Semi-final | | Final |
| Ballyhaunis | 1-18 |
| Four Roads | 0-12 |
| Four Roads | 0-12 | Cappataggle | 0-15 |
| | | Ballyhaunis | 1-10 |

2013

| Semi-final | | Final |
| Tooreen | 0-16 |
| Four Roads | 2-9 |
| Four Roads | 2-9 | Kilnadeema-Leitrim | 1-14 |
| | | Tooreen | 2-9 |

== List of Finals ==
| Year | Winners | | | Runners-up | | |
| Year | County | Club | Score | County | Club | Score |
|---|---|---|---|---|---|---|
| 2026 | MAY | Tooreen | 0-15 | GAL | Kilconieron | 0-12 |
| 2025 | MAY | Tooreen | 3-21 | GAL | Meelick-Eyrecourt | 2-12 |
| 2024 | GAL | Tynagh-Abbey/Duniry | 0-19 | MAY | Tooreen | 1-14 |
| 2023 | MAY | Tooreen | 0-21 | GAL | Ballinderreen | 0-19 |
| 2022 | MAY | Tooreen | 0-21 | GAL | Killimor | 1-15 |
| 2021 | MAY | Tooreen | 1-15 | GAL | Moycullen | 0-14 |
| 2020 | No championship | | | | | |
| 2019 | MAY | Tooreen | 0-21 | GAL | Kinvara | 2-10 |
| 2018 | GAL | Oranmore-Maree | 1-20 | MAY | Tooreen | 1-15 |
| 2017 | MAY | Tooreen | 1-15 | GAL | Ballinderreen | 1-11 |
| 2016 | GAL | Ahascragh-Fohenagh | 0–19, 2-20 (R) | MAY | Ballyhaunis | 2–13, 0-13 (R) |
| 2015 | GAL | Abbeyknockmoy | 1-11 | ROS | Four Roads | 0-11 |
| 2014 | GAL | Cappataggle | 0-15 | MAY | Ballyhaunis | 1-10 |
| 2013 | GAL | Kilnadeema–Leitrim | 1-14 | MAY | Tooreen | 2-09 |
| 2012 | GAL | Killimordaly | 0-16 | ROS | Four Roads | 0-10 |
| 2011 | GAL | Moycullen | 3-14 | ROS | Four Roads | 0-16 |
| 2010 | GAL | Pádraig Pearse's | 1-14 | MAY | Ballyhaunis | 1-10 |
| 2009 | GAL | Tynagh-Abbey/Duniry | 1-19 | MAY | Ballyhaunis | 0-12 |
| 2008 | GAL | Cappataggle | 0-14 | ROS | Four Roads | 2-07 |
| 2007 | GAL | Tommy Larkin's | 0-12 | MAY | Ballina | 1-01 |
| 2006 | GAL | Killimordaly | 3-14 | ROS | Athleague | 1-07 |
| 2005 | GAL | Tommy Larkin's | 2-21 | ROS | Four Roads | 0-14 |

== Roll of Honour ==
=== Wins by club ===
| # | Club | County | Titles | Runners-up | Championships won | Championships runner-up |
|---|---|---|---|---|---|---|
| 1 | Tooreen | MAY | 7 | 3 | 2017, 2019, 2021, 2022, 2023, 2025, 2026 | 2013, 2018, 2024 |
| 2 | Tommy Larkin's | GAL | 2 | 0 | 2005, 2007 | — |
| 2 | Killimordaly | GAL | 2 | 0 | 2006, 2012 | — |
| 2 | Cappataggle | GAL | 2 | 0 | 2008, 2014 | — |
| 2 | Tynagh-Abbey/Duniry | GAL | 2 | 0 | 2009, 2024 | — |
| 6 | Moycullen | GAL | 1 | 1 | 2011 | 2021 |
| 6 | Pádraig Pearse's | GAL | 1 | 0 | 2010 | — |
| 6 | Kilnadeema–Leitrim | GAL | 1 | 0 | 2013 | — |
| 6 | Abbeyknockmoy | GAL | 1 | 0 | 2015 | — |
| 6 | Ahascragh-Fohenagh | GAL | 1 | 0 | 2016 | — |
| 6 | Oranmore-Maree | GAL | 1 | 0 | 2018 | — |
| 12 | Four Roads | ROS | 0 | 5 | — | 2005, 2008, 2011, 2012, 2015 |
| 12 | Ballyhaunis | MAY | 0 | 4 | — | 2009, 2010, 2014, 2016 |
| 12 | Ballinderreen | GAL | 0 | 2 | — | 2017, 2023 |
| 12 | Athleague | ROS | 0 | 1 | — | 2006 |
| 12 | Ballina James Stephens | MAY | 0 | 1 | — | 2007 |
| 12 | Kinvara | GAL | 0 | 1 | — | 2019 |
| 12 | Killimor | GAL | 0 | 1 | — | 2022 |
| 12 | Meelick-Eyrecourt | GAL | 0 | 1 | — | 2025 |
| 12 | Kilconieron | GAL | 0 | 1 | — | 2026 |

=== By county ===
| County | Titles | Runners-up | Total | Most recent success |
|---|---|---|---|---|
| Galway | 14 | 7 | 21 | 2024 |
| Mayo | 7 | 8 | 15 | 2026 |
| Roscommon | 0 | 6 | 6 | — |

== Records and statistics ==
=== County representatives ===
| Year | Galway | London | Mayo | Roscommon |
|---|---|---|---|---|
| 2026 | Kilconieron | Brothers Pearse | Tooreen | Four Roads |
| 2025 | Meelick-Eyrecourt | St Gabriel's | Tooreen | Four Roads |
| 2024 | Tynagh-Abbey/Duniry | St Gabriel's | Tooreen | Four Roads |
| 2023 | Ballinderreen | Brothers Pearse | Tooreen | Four Roads |
| 2022 | Killimor | St Gabriel's | Tooreen | Four Roads |
| 2021 | Moycullen | Robert Emmetts | Tooreen | Athleague |
| 2019 | Kinvara | Robert Emmetts | Tooreen | Four Roads |
| 2018 | Oranmore–Maree | St Gabriel's | Tooreen | Athleague |
| 2017 | Ballinderreen | n/a | Tooreen | Padraig Pearses |
| 2016 | Ahascragh–Fohenagh | n/a | Ballyhaunis | Oran |
| 2015 | Abbeyknockmoy | n/a | Ballyhaunis | Four Roads |
| 2014 | Cappataggle | n/a | Ballyhaunis | Four Roads |
| 2013 | Kilnadeema–Leitrim | n/a | Tooreen | Four Roads |
| 2012 | Killimordaly | n/a | Ballyhaunis | Four Roads |
| 2011 | Moycullen | n/a | Ballyhaunis | Four Roads |
| 2010 | Pádraig Pearses | n/a | Ballyhaunis | Four Roads |
| 2009 | Tynagh–Abbey/Duniry | n/a | Ballyhaunis | Four Roads |

=== Top scorers ===
==== By year ====
| Year | Top scorer | Team | Score | Total |
|---|---|---|---|---|
| 2004 | | | | |
| 2005 | | | | |
| 2006 | Éanna Ryan | Killimordaly | 1-03 | 6 |
| 2007 | Éamonn Hayes | Tommy Larkin's | 0-10 | 10 |
| 2008 | | | | |
| 2009 | Keith Higgins | Ballyhaunis | 0-15 | 15 |
| 2010 | Keith Higgins | Ballyhaunis | 1-14 | 17 |
| 2011 | Shane Curley | Four Roads | 0-15 | 15 |
| 2012 | David Dolan | Tooreen | 0-08 | 8 |
| 2012 | Keith Higgins | Ballyhaunis | 0-08 | 8 |
| 2013 | Kenny Feeney | Tooreen | 2-14 | 20 |
| 2014 | Keith Higgins | Ballyhaunis | 1-08 | 11 |
| 2015 | Keith Higgins | Ballyhaunis | 0-10 | 10 |
| 2016 | Keith Higgins | Ballyhaunis | 2-23 | 29 |
| 2017 | Shane Boland | Tooreen | 0-15 | 15 |
| 2018 | Shane Boland | Tooreen | 1-27 | 30 |
| 2019 | Shane Boland | Tooreen | 0-30 | 30 |
| 2020 | No championship | | | |
| 2022 | Shane Boland | Tooreen | 0-23 | 23 |
| 2022 | Seán Kenny | Tooreen | 0-19 | 19 |
| 2023 | Shane Boland | Tooreen | 0-15 | 15 |
| 2024 | Shane Boland | Tooreen | 0-17 | 17 |
| 2025 | Fergal Boland | Tooreen | 1-11 | 14 |
| 2025 | Shane Boland | Tooreen | 0-14 | 14 |
| 2026 | Eoin Delaney | Tooreen | 3-09 | 18 |
| 2026 | Shane Boland | Tooreen | 0-18 | 18 |

== See also ==
- All-Ireland Intermediate Club Hurling Championship
- Munster Intermediate Club Hurling Championship
- Leinster Intermediate Club Hurling Championship
- Ulster Intermediate Club Hurling Championship
