= 2025–26 All-Ireland Intermediate Club Hurling Championship =

All-Ireland inter-county competition for intermediate clubs

Championship Details
- Dates: 25 October 2025 – 10 January 2026
- Teams: 27

All Ireland Champions
- Winners: Upperchurch–Drombane (1st win)
- Captain: Keith Ryan
- Manager: Liam Dunphy

All Ireland Runners-up
- Runners-up: Tooreen
- Captain: Fergal Boland
- Manager: Ray Larkin

Provincial Champions
- Munster: Upperchurch–Drombane
- Leinster: Danesfort
- Ulster: Éire Óg Carrickmore
- Connacht: Tooreen

Championship Statistics
- Matches Played: 26
- Total Goals: 64 (2.46 per game)
- Total Points: 849 (32.65 per game)
- Top Scorer: Aidan Kelly (0-38)

The 2025–26 All-Ireland Intermediate Club Hurling Championship was the 21st staging of the All-Ireland Intermediate Club Hurling Championship, the Gaelic Athletic Association's intermediate inter-county club hurling tournament. The championship ran from 25 October 2025 to 10 January 2026.

The All-Ireland final was played at Croke Park in Dublin on 10 January 2025, between Upperchurch–Drombane of Tipperary and Tooreen of Mayo, in what was a first championship meeting between the teams. Upperchurch–Drombanewon the match by 4–20 to 2–24 and became the second team from Tipperary to win the title.

Éire Óg Carrickmore's Aidan Kelly was the championship's top scorer with 0-38.

== Team summaries ==
Team	Championship	Most recent success		
Team	Championship	All-Ireland	Provincial	County
Abbeydorney	Kerry SHC			2024
Ballinhassig	Cork PIHC		2005	2012
Ballyfin	Laois PIHC			
Carnew Emmets	Wicklow SHC			2009
Castleblayney	Monaghan SHC			2024
Commercials	Dublin PIHC			
Danesfort	Kilkenny IHC			2022
Delvin	Westmeath SBHC			2010
Éire Óg Carrickmore	Tyrone SHC			2024
Fethard St Mogue's	Wexford IHC			2018
Four Roads	Roscommon SHC			2024
Garryspillane	Limerick PIHC			2018
Liatroim Fontenoys	Down IHC		2022	2022
Lisbellaw St Patrick's	Fermanagh SHC		2012	2013
Lusmagh	Offaly SBHC			
Meelick–Eyrecourt	Galway IHC			1997
Middletown Na Fianna	Armagh SHC		2017	2024
Naomh Bríd	Carlow IHC			2021
O'Callaghan's Mills	Clare PIHC			1977
Glenariffe Oisín	Antrim IHC			2000
Ratoath	Meath SHC			2024
St Eunan's	Donegal IHC			2001
St Gabriel's	London SHC			2024
Swatragh	Derry IHC			2024
Tallow	Waterford PIHC			1987
Tooreen	Mayo SHC		2023	2024
Upperchurch–Drombane	Tipperary PIHC			1998

== Connacht Intermediate Club Hurling Championship ==
The draw for the Connacht Club Championship took place on 18 December 2024.

=== Connacht quarter-final ===
2 November 2025 Quarter-final	Four Roads (Roscommon)	1-12 - 1-17	Tooreen (Mayo)	Athleague Grounds
	C Morris (1-6, six frees), C Mulry (0-1), A Donnelly (0-1), E Mulry (0-1), C Mulry (0-1), O Finneran (0-1), N Fallon (0-1, one free).	Report	S Boland (0-6, five frees), K Feeney (1-1), F Boland (0-3), E Delaney (0-2), Seán Kenny (0-2, one free), D Kenny (0-1), F Delaney (0-1), J Hoey (Four Roads, 0-1, own point).

=== Connacht semi-final ===
15 November 2025 Semi-final	St Gabriel's (London)	0-08 - 3-21	Tooreen (Mayo)	McGovern Park
	J Morrissey 0-5 (1 ’65, 2f), R Lodge 0-2, S Glynn 0-1.	Report	F Boland 1-4, S Boland 0-6 (3f), K Feeney 1-1, E Delaney 1-0, J Boyle 0-3 (1f), S Kenny (1 ’65, 1f) and F Delaney (2f) 0-2 each, B Morley, B Douglas (f) and L Lavin 0-1 each.

=== Connacht final ===
22 November 2025 Final	Meelick–Eyrecourt (Galway)	2-12 - 3-21	Tooreen (Mayo)	King & Moffat Dr Hyde Park
	N Earner 0-8 (7f), J Fleming 1-1, J Lyons 1-0, J McEvoy 0-2, N Fleming 0-1.	Report	L Lavin 2-3, S Kenny 1-5 (1-0pen, 5f), F Boland 0-4, B Morley 0-3, S Boland 0-2 (1f), B Douglas (f), D Kenny, J Boyle and F Delaney 0-1 each.

== Leinster Intermediate Club Hurling Championship ==
=== Leinster first round ===
25 October 2025 First round	Delvin (Westmeath)	0-11 - 1-12	Naomh Bríd (Carlow)	Clonkill Grounds
	D Clinton 0-8 (5fs), C Fenlon 0-2, O Kelly 0-1.	Report	A Amond 0-7 (3fs), J Murphy 1-2, R O’Neill 0-1, J Connolly 0-1, E Holland 0-1.

=== Leinster quarter-finals ===
8 November 2025 Quarter-final	Lusmagh (Offaly)	0-17 - 1-09	Ballyfin (Laois)	Grant Heating St Brendan's Park
	P Kinsella 0-7 (7f), A Kelly 0-3, D Healy 0-2, A Flynn, E Kelly, D Temple, E Quinlan, G Lynch 0-1 each.	Report	G Dunphy 0-5 (5f), R Carroll 1-0, J Heffernan, E Duff, S Connolly, A Connolly 0-1 each.

8 November 2025 Quarter-final	Carnew Emmets (Wicklow)	0-13 - 1-20	Ratoath (Meath)	Echelon Park
	P Doran (0-4 two frees, one ‘65’), E Kavanagh (0-2 one free), F Darcy (0-2), J Doyle (0-1), T Collins (0-1); R Stokes (0-1); K Cullen (0-1).	Report	P O’Hanrahan (0-15 thirteen frees); G McGowan (1-0), C Rogers (0-3), B McMahon (0-1), J McGowan (0-1).

8 November 2025 Quarter-final	Fethard St Mogues (Wexford)	2-14 - 1-24	Danesfort (Kilkenny)	Chadwicks Wexford Park
	C Byrne 0-10, A O'Grady 1-0, B Power 1-0, C Byrne 0-2, M Dwyer 0-1, E Whelan 0-1.	Report	A Ireland Wall 0-9, F Mahony 1-4, C Kearney 0-5, C Phelan 0-3, C O'Neill 0-2, S Hayes 0-1.

8 November 2025 Quarter-final	Commercials (Dublin)	3-19 - 0-12	Naomh Bríd (Carlow)	Parnell Park
	D Ó Dúlaing 0-8 (4f); S McCarthy 1-2; F Ó Nualláin, J Flanagan 1-0 each; D O’Kelly 0-3; A Drewett, C Cleary 0-2 each; D Simpson, J O’Keeffe 0-1 apiece.	Report	A Amond 0-8 (6f); J Connolly 0-2; M Bambrick, J Murphy 0-1 apiece.

=== Leinster semi-finals ===
22 November 2025 Semi-final	Lusmagh (Offaly)	1-12 - 0-22	Ratoath (Meath)	Grant Heating St Brendan's Park
	E Kelly (0-4, 0-3 frees), E Quinlan (0-3), D Kelly (1-0), D Kelly, L Troy, P Kinsella (free), D Healy, G Lynch (0-1 each).	Report	P O'Hanrahan (0-8, 0-5 frees), C Rogers (0-5), G McGowan (0-3), R Hayes (0-2), D McGowan, C O'Hanrahan, B McMahon, D Rogers (0-1 each).

22 November 2025 Semi-final	Danesfort (Kilkenny)	1-19 - 0-10	Commercials (Dublin)	UPMC Nowlan Park
	F Mahony 1-3; A Ireland Wall 0-4 (2f); R Walsh, C Phelan, C O’Neill, D O’Neill 0-2 each; D Dunne, S Hayes, C Kearney (f), D Dowling 0-1 apiece.	Report	D Ó Dúlaing 0-7 (4f); C Cleary, R Butler, D Simpson 0-1 apiece.

=== Leinster final ===
7 December 2025 Final	Ratoath (Meath)	0-12 - 2-15	Danesfort (Kilkenny)	Páirc Tailteann
	P O'Hanrahan 0-10 (0-8f), D McGowan 0-1, D Kelly 0-1.	Report	A Ireland Wall 0-5 (0-3f), S Hayes 1-1, R Hogan 1-1, P Hogan 0-2 (0-2f), R Walsh 0-2, C Kearney 0-1 (0-1f), D O'Neill 0-1, C O'Neill 0-1, F Mahony 0-1.

== Munster Intermediate Club Hurling Championship ==
The draw for the Munster Club Championship took place on 31 July 2025.

=== Munster quarter-finals ===
1 November 2025 Quarter-final	Tallow (Waterford)	3-18 - 3-16 (aet)	Garryspillane (Limerick)	Cappoquin Logistics Fraher Field
	T Ryan (1-7, 0-4f, 0-1 ‘65); P O’Brien (2-1); D Buckley (0-5; 0-3f; 0-1 ‘65); I Beecher (0-2); J Henley, R Geary, S Murphy (0-1 each).	Report	H Flanagan (3-11; 0-8f; 0-2 ‘65); D Heavey, J English, C Ryan, R Tobin, C Sheehan (0-1 each).

2 November 2025 Quarter-final	O'Callaghan's Mills (Clare)	1-19 - 1-17	Abbeydorney (Kerry)	Zimmer Biomet Páirc Chíosóg
	S Boyce (0-5), J Loughnane (1-1, 1f), G Cooney (0-3), A O’Gorman, A Fawl, D Moroney (0-2 each), C Cooney, C Cleary, C Henry and B Donnellan (0-1 each).	Report	M O’Leary (0-8, 6fs), K Varian (1-0), O Maunsell (0-3), C O’Sullivan, J Sheehan, and M Slattery (0-2 each).

=== Munster semi-finals ===
16 November 2025 Semi-final	Tallow (Waterford)	1-21 - 1-23	O'Callaghan's Mills (Clare)	Mallow GAA Complex
	D Buckley 0-9 (seven frees); T Ryan 0-5; R Grey 1-2 (two frees); S Murphy 0-2; J Henley 0-2, C Henley 0-1.	Report	C Murphy 0-6; S Boyce 1-2; J Loughnane (four frees), G Cooney 0-4 each; K Nugent 0-2 (one free, one sixty five); S Cotter, A Fawl, D Moroney, C Henry, C Cleary 0-1 each.

16 November 2025 Semi-final	Upperchurch–Drombane (Tipperary)	2-14 - 0-17	Ballinhassig (Cork)	FBD Semple Stadium
	L Shanahan 0-5 (0-3 f), A Ryan 0-3, Pat Ryan 1-1 (0-1 sl), C Fahey 1-0, P Shanahan, G Ryan (f), P Greene, D Carew, P Phelan 0-1 each.	Report	G Collins 0-6 f, S McCarthy, M Collins 0-2 each, P Collins (f), F O’Leary, E Cullinane, S O’Neill, D O’Sullivan, B Lynch, C Desmond 0-1 each.

=== Munster final ===
29 November 2025 Final	Upperchurch–Drombane (Tipperary)	3-20 - 0-15	O'Callaghan's Mills (Clare)	TUS Gaelic Grounds
	C Fahey (1-2); L Shanahan (0-5, 3 frees); P Phelan (1-1); C Ryan (1-0); A Ryan, Pat Ryan (0-3 each); G Ryan (0-2, 2 frees); N Grant, D Grant, Paul Ryan, P Greene (0-1 each).	Report	S Boyce (0-5, 3 frees); J Loughnane (0-4, 3 frees, 1 65); G Cooney (0-3); S Cotter, A O’Gorman, C Murphy (0-1 each).

== Ulster Intermediate Club Hurling Championship ==
=== Bracket ===
Quarter-finals		Semi-finals		Final
Lisbellaw St Patrick's (Fermanagh)	0-19
Swatragh (Derry)	0-14	Lisbellaw St Patrick's (Fermanagh)	1-14
Castleblayney (Monaghan)	1-23	Castleblayney (Monaghan)	2-10
Middletown Na Fianna (Armagh)	2-16			Lisbellaw St Patrick's (Fermanagh)	0-15
St Eunan's (Donegal)	1-09			Éire Óg Carrickmore (Tyrone)	1-18
Éire Óg Carrickmore (Tyrone)	1-16	Glenariffe Oisín (Antrim)	2-18
Glenariffe Oisín (Antrim)	2-17	Éire Óg Carrickmore (Tyrone)	3-16
Liatroim Fontenoys (Down)	1-16

=== Ulster quarter-finals ===
1 November 2025 Quarter-final	Glenariffe Oisín (Antrim)	2-17 - 1-16	Liatroim Fontenoys (Down)	Fr Healy Park
	A O’Boyle 0-11 (fs), O O’Connor 1-2, M O’Boyle 1-1, C Patterson 0-1, S McIntosh 0-1.	Report	P óg McCrickard 0-7 (6 fs), C Kelly-McEvoy 1-1, C McCrickard 0-3, C Leneghan 0-1, Ruairí McCrickard 0-1 (f), C Lynch 0-1, DJ Farrell 0-1, D Magee 0-1.

2 November 2025 Quarter-final	Lisbellaw St Patrick's (Fermanagh)	0-19 - 0-14	Swatragh (Derry)	Brewster Park
	J Duffy 0-10, S Corrigan 0-3, C Corrigan 0-3, R Bogue 0-2, L McCusker 0-1.	Report	C Murray 0-6, D Quinn 0-4, SM Quinn 0-1, F McGurk 0-1.

2 November 2025 Quarter-final	Castleblayney (Monaghan)	1-23 - 2-16	Middletown Na Fianna (Armagh)	Castleblayney Grounds
		Report	D Gaffney 0-9, C Carvill 1-0, R Gaffney 1-0, J Toal 0-2, B Toal 0-2, S Gaffney 0-1, P McBride 0-1, T Nevin 0-1.

2 November 2025 Quarter-final	St Eunan's (Donegal)	1-09 - 1-16	Éire Óg Carrickmore (Tyrone)	O'Donnell Park
	P Kelly 0-5,4f; J Kealy 1-2; G Delaney and S McVeigh both 0-1 each.	Report	A Kelly 0-10, 8f; S Munroe 1-0; C Grogan, A Crossan, A Woods, D Rafferty, O Daly and S Óg Grogan 0-1 each.

=== Ulster semi-finals ===
15 November 2025 Semi-final	Glenariffe Oisín (Antrim)	2-18 - 3-16	Éire Óg Carrickmore (Tyrone)	Owenbeg Centre of Excellence
	M O’Boyle 0-6, S McIntosh 1-2, C Ward 1-2, O O’Connor 0-3, A O’Boyle 0-2, O Kearney 0-1, C McIlwaine 0-1.	Report	A Kelly 0-8, A Woods 1-2; S Munroe 0-5, D Begley 1-0, D Rafferty 1-0; O Daly 0-1,

16 November 2025 Semi-final	Lisbellaw St Patrick's (Fermanagh)	1-14 - 2-10	Castleblayney (Monaghan)	Ballyconnell Grounds
	J Duffy 0-4, A McShea 1-0, C Duffy 0-3, S Corrigan 0-2, C Corrigan 0-2, J Tormey 0-2, L McCusker 0-1.	Report	L Moloney 0-8, N Garland 2-1, M Treanor 0-1.

=== Ulster final ===
30 November 2025 Final	Éire Óg Carrickmore (Tyrone)	1-18 - 0-15	Lisbellaw St Patrick's (Fermanagh)	St Tiernach’s Park
	A Kelly 0-11 (0-6f, 2x65), S Óg Grogan 1-0, C Sweeney 0-2; S Munroe 0-2, C Grogan 0-2, A Woods 0-1.	Report	J Duffy 0-7 (0-5f, 1x65), F McBrien 0-3, Caolan Duffy 0-2, L McCusker 0-1, S Corrigan 0-1; C Corrigan 0-1.

== All-Ireland Intermediate Club Hurling Championship ==
=== All-Ireland semi-finals ===
21 December 2025 Semi-final	Tooreen (Mayo)	1-28 - 1-17	Éire Óg Carrickmore (Tyrone)	Kingspan Breffni
	S Boland 1-8 (3fs), E Delaney 0-7 (1 s/l), S Kenny (3fs), L Lavin 0-4 each, F Boland 0-2, B Morley, O Greally, F Delaney 0-1 each.	Report	A Kelly 0-9 (6fs), D Begley 1-0 (1-0f), S Munroe 0-3, S Sweeney, F Hurson, C Grogan, A Woods 0-1 each.

21 December 2025 Semi-final	Danesfort (Kilkenny)	0-14 - 1-13	Upperchurch–Drombane (Tipperary)	Laois Hire O'Moore Park
	A Ireland Wall 0-7 (6fs), F Mahony 0-3, D Dunne 0-2, R Walsh and C O’Neill 0-1 each.	Report	L Shanahan 0-7 (7fs), P Ryan 1-1, P Greene 0-2, G Ryan 0-2 (2fs), C Ryan 0-1.	Referee: S Hynes (Galway)

=== All-Ireland final ===
10 January 2026 Final	Tooreen (Mayo)	2-24 - 4-20 (aet)	Upperchurch–Drombane (Tipperary)	Croke Park
	F Boland 0-6, B Morley 0-4, L Lavin 1-0, D Harrison 1-0, J Boyle 0-3, E Delaney 0-3, K Feeney 0-3, S Kenny 0-2, B Douglas 0-1 (0-1f), S Boland 0-1 (0-1f), F Delaney 0-1 (0-1f).	Report	L Shanahan 0-7 (0-5f), C Fahey 2-0, G Ryan 0-5 (0-4f, 0-1 65), P Shanahan 1-1, P Phelan 1-0, P Ryan 0-3 (0-1 s/l), C Ryan 0-1, M Griffin 0-1, D Grant 0-1, J Butler 0-1.	Referee: C Flynn (Westmeath)

== Championship statistics ==
=== Top scorers ===
Rank	Player	Club	Tally	Total	Matches	Average
1	Aidan Kelly	Éire Óg Carrickmore	0-38	38	4	9.50
2	Pádraig O'Hanrahan	Ratoath	0-33	33	3	10.00
3	Shane Boland	Tooreen	1-23	26	5	5.20
4	Anthony Ireland Wall	Danesfort	0-25	25	4	6.25
5	Luke Shanahan	Upperchurch–Drombane	0-24	24	4	6.00
6	Fergal Boland	Tooreen	1-19	22	5	4.40
7	John Duffy	Lisbellaw St Patrick's	0-21	21	3	7.00
8	Hugh Flanagan	Garryspillane	3-11	20	1	20.00
9	Liam Lavin	Tooreen	3-08	17	5	3.40
9	Fionn Mahony	Danesfort	2-11	17	4	4.25
