= Nicky Horan =

Irish hurler

Nicholas Horan
Personal information
- Born: 12 February 1978 (age 48) County Dublin
- Occupation: Student

Sport
- Sport: Hurling
- Position: Substitute
Club
- Years: Club
- Kilmessan/Unknown
Club titles
- Meath titles: 2
Inter-county
Years	County	Apps (scores)
2004-2008	Meath	? (8-53)
Inter-county titles
- Leinster titles: 0
- All-Irelands: 0
- All Stars: 0

Niochalas Horan is a retired hurler from County Meath. He played with the Meath team. He received a Kehoe Cup and the Leinster Junior Hurling Championship in the 90's, and 00's, and the All-Ireland Junior Hurling Championship in 2004 in his 1st year. He won a Nicky Rackard Cup also.

== Football ==
Horan played football at minor and Under 21 level with Dunsany in Meath.

He has had success at club level with Kilmessan winning Meath Senior Hurling Championships in 2004 and 2008 and a Leinster Intermediate Club Hurling Championship in 2008.

He retired soon after his Leinster Intermediate Club championship success with Kilmessan citing family and work commitments as his reasons and decided he had achieved enough at top tier hurling!
