= 2015–16 All-Ireland Intermediate Club Hurling Championship =

Championship Details
- Dates: 4 October 2015 – 7 February 2016
- Teams: 24

All Ireland Champions
- Winners: Bennettsbridge (1st win)
- Captain: Enda Morrissey
- Manager: Christy Walsh

All Ireland Runners-up
- Runners-up: Abbeyknockmoy
- Captain: John Culkin
- Manager: Johnny Kelly

Provincial Champions
- Munster: Wolfe Tones na Sionna
- Leinster: Bennettsbridge
- Ulster: Creggan Kickhams
- Connacht: Abbeyknockmoy

Championship Statistics
- Matches Played: 20
- Total Goals: 47 (2.35 per game)
- Total Points: 511 (25.55 per game)
- Top Scorer: Nicky Cleere (0-33)

The 2015–16 All-Ireland Intermediate Club Hurling Championship is the 12th staging of the All-Ireland Intermediate Club Hurling Championship, the Gaelic Athletic Association's secondary inter-county club hurling tournament. The championship began on 4 October 2015 and ended on 7 February 2016.

The All-Ireland final was played on 7 January 2016 at Croke Park in Dublin, between Bennettsbridge from Kilkenny and Abbeyknockmoy from Galway, in what was their first ever meeting in the final. Bennettsbridge won the match by 1-17 to 1-14 to claim their first All-Ireland title in this grade, having won the All-Ireland Club JHC title in 2015.

Bennettsbridge's Nicky Cleere was the championship's top scorer with 0-33.

== Connacht Intermediate Club Hurling Championship ==
=== Connacht semi-final ===
26 October 2015 Semi-final	Four Roads	3–09 – 1–12	Ballyhaunis	Athleague Sportsfield
	J Coyne (1–2), J Lawlor (1–1), E Mulry (1–0), D Dolan (0–3, all frees), M Kelly (0–2, one free, one ‘65), A Lawlor (0–1).	Report	K Higgins (0–10, four frees), M Lyons (1–1), S Hoban (0–1).	Referee: J Keane (Galway)

=== Connacht final ===
7 November 2015 Final	Four Roads	0–11 – 1–11	Abbeyknockmoy	Athleague Sportsfield
	M Kelly 0-4, D Dolan 0-4, J Coyne 0-2, J Moran 0-1.	Report	P Flaherty 0-6, P O'Donnell 1-0, D Mullins 0-2, F Garvey 0-1, D Rooney 0-1, C Maher 0-1.

== Leinster Intermediate Club Hurling Championship ==
=== Leinster quarter-finals ===
25 October 2015 Quarter-final	Bennettsbridge	2–21 – 1–06	Coill Dubh	Bennettsbridge Grounds
	K Blanchfield 0-6, W Murphy 1-2, H O'Neill 1-2, S Morrissey 0-4, K Brennan 0-3, L Blanchfield 0-2, A Cleere 0-1, J Cleere 0-1.	Report	T Brady 1-0, T Byrne 0-2, E O'Neill 0-1, M Delaney 0-1, D Flaherty 0-1, A McAndrew 0-1.

25 October 2015 Quarter-final	Bray Emmets	1–18 – 1–09	St Oliver Plunketts	Aughrim County Ground
	M Lee 0-6, P Doyle 1-2, C Moorehouse 0-5, D Masterson 0-3, P Cunningham 0-1, M Lennon 0-1.		L Corbett 0-6, S Bonfil 1-1, C Boland 0-1, R Ó Broin 0-1,

25 October 2015 Quarter-final	Kiltale	2–13 – 1–13	Naomh Éanna	St Loman's Park
	J Regan (0–8, 2 65s, 5fs), C McCabe (1–0), P Durnin (0–2), E Ryan (0–1), P Kelly (0–1), K Ryan (0–1).	Report	P Doyle (0–6, 3fs 2 65), C McDonald (1–5, 0-3fs), W Cullen (0–2).	Referee: M Murtagh (Westmeath)

=== Leinster semi-finals ===
8 November 2015 Semi-final	Bray Emmets	1–06 – 0–18	Bennettsbridge	Aughrim County Ground
	C Moorehouse (5f) 1-06.	Report	N Cleere (7f) 10; L Blanchfield, K Blanchfield, B Lennon, 0-02 each; K Brennan, S Morrissey 0-01 each.

14 November 2015 Semi-final	Kiltale	2–11 – 1–12	Portlaoise	St Loman's Park
	P Durnin (1–2), J Regan (0–4, 3fs, 1 65), K Ryan (1–0), A Forde (0–2), P Kelly (0–1), J Kelly (0–1), R Ryan (0–1).	Report	A Bergin (0–6, 4fs, 1 65), D O'Mahony (1–0), C Taylor (0–2), N Costello (0-1f), T Fitzgerald (0–1), J Phelan (0–1), D Lynch (0–1).	Referee: M Murtagh (Westmeath)

=== Leinster final ===
21 November 2015 Final	Bennettsbridge	1–14 – 0–13	Kiltale	Nowlan Park
	N Cleere 0–9 (7fs, 1 '65'), B Lannon 1–1, L Blanchfield 0–2, J Cleere, S Morrissey 0–1 each.	Report	J Regan 0–8 (6fs, 1 '65'), K Ryan, P Durnin 0–2 each, P Kelly 0–1.	Referee: B Redmond (Wexford)

== Munster Intermediate Club Hurling Championship ==
=== Munster quarter-finals ===
24 October 2015 Quarter-final	Wolfe Tones, Shannon	4–12 – 2–06	Kilmoyley	O'Garney Park
	A Cunningham (2–2), A Shanagher (1–3), D O’Rourke (1–2), B O'Gorman (0–2), B Loughnane (0–1), J Cunningham (0–1), K McCafferty (0–1).	Report	D Collins (0–4), T Maunsell (1–0), R Collins (1–0), T Murnane (0–1).	Referee: N Wall (Cork)

1 November 2015 Quarter-final	Clonakenny	1–17 – 1–13	Portlaw	Templetuohy Grounds
	JJ Ryan (0–8; 0-3f), W Ryan (0–6; 0-3f), W Moloughney (1–2) and C Ryan (0–1).	Report	DJ Foran (1–1), J Hartley (0–3), P Power (0-3f), B O’Connor and N Fitzgerald (0–2 each), J Murphy (0-2f).	Referee: D Fox (Clare)

=== Munster semi-finals ===
8 November 2015 Semi-final	Newcestown	0–14 – 0–13	Clonakenny	Cloughduv Grounds
	E Kelly (0–4, 1 free); D Twomey (1 free), T Horgan, J Meade (0–3 each); C O’Neill (0–1).	Report	JJ Ryan (0–6, frees); W Ryan (1 free), W Moloughney (0–3 each); MJ Carroll (0–1).	Referee: D O’Driscoll (Limerick)

8 November 2015 Semi-final	Bruree	0–11 – 1–12	Wolfe Tones, Shannon	FitzGerald Park
	K O’Dea (0–5), M Lane (0–3), G O’Dea (0–1), S Mullane (0–1), J O’Dea (0–1).	Report	A Shanagher (0–6), R Hayes (1–1), D O’Connell (0–2), B Loughnane (0–1), B O’Gorman (0–1), A Cunningham (0–1).	Referee: T Walsh (Waterford)

=== Munster final ===
21 November 2015 Final	Newcestown	2–13 – 1–18	Wolfe Tones, Shannon	Mallow GAA Complex
	T Horgan (2–0); E Kelly (0–9, 0–9 frees); M McSweeney, C Keane, T Twomey, L Meade (0–1 each).	Report	A Shanagher (0–9, 0–7 frees, 0–1 ’65); G O’Connell (1–1); B O’Gorman (0–3, 0–1 sc); J Cunningham, K McCafferty, D O’Connell, R Hayes, J Guilfoyle (0–1 each).	Referee: J Murphy (Limerick)

== Ulster Intermediate Club Hurling Championship ==
=== Ulster quarter-finals ===
4 October 2015 Quarter-final	Castleblayney	0–13 – 4–15	Creggan Kickhams	St. Mary's Park
	N Garland 0-5, F Rafter 0-3, M Treanor 0-2, H Byrne 0-1, S Lambe 0-1, F Finnegan 0-1.		C Small 3-3, O McCann 0-5, K Rice 1-1, C McCann 0-3, J Carey 0-1, R McCann 0-1, A McKeown 0-1.

4 October 2015 Quarter-final	Na Magha CLG	1–08 – 1–19	Carryduff	Owenbeg COE
		Report

4 October 2015 Quarter-final	Keady Lámh Dhearg	0–16 – 1–18	Eire Óg Carrickmore	Garard McGleenan Park
	C McKee 0-6, C Corvan 0-4, J King 0-2, J Corvan 0-2, M Hughes 0-1, D McKenna 0-1.		G Fox 1-5, A Kelly 0-5, C Grogan 0-3, J Munroe 0-2, P Hughes 0-1, P Daly 0-1, S Óg Grogan 0-1.

=== Ulster semi-finals ===
11 October 2015 Semi-final	Creggan Kickhams	2–20 – 1–15	Burt	Owenbeg COE

11 October 2015 Semi-final	Eire Óg Carrickmore	3–17 – 1–10	Carryduff	Garard McGleenan Park
	A Kelly 0–6, P Daly 1–2, R McKernan 1–1, J Kelly 0–4, C Grogan 0–3, G Fox 1–0, J Munroe 0–1.	Report	R Beatty 1–5, G Lynch 0–2, C Beatty 0–1, M Conway 0–1, E Conway 0–1,

=== Ulster final ===
25 October 2015 Final	Creggan Kickhams	2–12 – 1–07	Eire Óg Carrickmore	Owenbeg COE
	C Small 1–1, C McCann 1–0, O McCann 0–4 (2f), K Rice 0–3, S Maguire 0–2, R McCann, K Small 0–1 each.	Report	S Og Grogan 1–1; Justin Kelly (1 '65), A Kelly (3f) 0–3.	Referee: A Nash (Derry)

== All-Ireland Intermediate Club Hurling Championship ==
=== All-Ireland quarter-final ===
21 November 2015 Quarter-final	Robert Emmetts	0–05 – 0–10	Abbeyknockmoy	Irish TV Grounds
	E Chawke 0–2 (1 ’65), F McMahon 0–1 (f), S Finn 0–1, R Costello 0–1.	Report	Paul Flaherty 0–2 (2 fs), F Garvey 0–4 (3 f), Brian O’Donnell 0–2, C Maher 0–1, Brian Flaherty 0–1.	Referee: C Lyons (Cork)

=== All-Ireland semi-finals ===
23 January 2016 Semi-final	Bennettsbridge	0–15 – 0–08	Wolfe Tones	St. Rynagh's Park
	N Cleere (0-7, 5f, 1'65), H O'Neill (0-3), S Morrissey (0-2), D Wafer (0-1), B Lannon (0-1); W Murphy (0-1).	Report	Aaron Shanagher (0-5f), A Cunningham (0-2), B O'Gorman (0-1f).

24 January 2016 Semi-final	Abbeyknockmoy	1–13 – 0–09	Creggan Kickhams	Páirc Tailteann
	F Garvey (0-5, 0-4 frees); C Kennedy (1-0), P Flaherty (0-2, 0-1 free), B Flaherty (0-2), T Mullins (0-1), Mulry (0-1), D Rooney (0-1); C Maher (0-1),	Report	C Small (0-3 frees); K Small (0-2), J Carey (0-1), D Carey (0-1), S Maguire (0-1), T McCann (0-1).	Referee: P Murphy (Carlow)

=== All-Ireland final ===
7 February 2016 Final	Bennettsbridge	1–17 – 1–14	Abbeyknockmoy	Croke Park
	S Morrissey 1-6, N Cleere 0-7fs, W Murphy 0-2, B Lannon, H O'Neill 0-1 each.	Report	P Flaherty 0-9 (6f), G Kennedy 1-0, B Flaherty, B Costello, C Mulry, E Blade, F Garvey 0-1 each.	Referee: J Keenan (Wicklow)
