= 2014–15 All-Ireland Intermediate Club Hurling Championship =

Championship Details
- Dates: 5 October 2014 – 15 February 2015
- Teams: 23

All Ireland Champions
- Winners: O'Donovan Rossa (1 win)
- Captain: Eoghan O'Neill
- Manager: Séamus Shannon

All Ireland Runners-up
- Runners-up: Kilburn Gaels
- Manager: Tom Bergin

Provincial Champions
- Munster: Cappoquin
- Leinster: Mullinavat
- Ulster: O'Donovan Rossa
- Connacht: Cappataggle

Championship Statistics
- Matches Played: 21

The 2014–15 All-Ireland Intermediate Club Hurling Championship was the 11th staging of the All-Ireland Intermediate Club Hurling Championship since its establishment by the Gaelic Athletic Association in 2004.

The All-Ireland final was played on 16 February 2015 at Croke Park in Dublin, between O’Donovan Rossa from Antrim and Kilburn Gaels from London. O'Donovan Rossa won the match by 1-09 to 2-03 to become the first Antrim club to claim the All-Ireland title.

== Connacht Intermediate Club Hurling Championship ==
=== Connacht semi-final ===
27 October 2014 Semi-final	Four Roads	1–10 – 2–10	Ballyhaunis	Athleague Sportsfield
	D Dolan 0-5, R Kelly 1-0, S Curley 0-2, P Kelly 0-2, C Coyle 0-1.		S Hoban 1-3, D O'Brien 0-4, P Kiely 1-0, K Higgins 0-2, E Collins 0-1.

=== Connacht final ===
9 November 2014 Final	Cappataggle	0–15 – 1–10	Ballyhaunis	Duggan Park
	A Dolan 0-6 (5fs), D Dolan, J Mannion 0-2 each, J Skehill (f), A Loughnane, K Kelly, P Egan, E Malone 0-1 each.	Report	K Higgins 1-6, D O'Brien 0-2 (2fs), F Lyons, P Kiely 0-1 each.	Referee: D Fox

== Leinster Intermediate Club Hurling Championship ==
=== Leinster quarter-finals ===
26 October 2014 Quarter-final	Ballinakill	0–18 – 0–15	Bray Emmets	O'Moore Park
	C Dwyer 0-7, E Jackman 0-5, MJ Dunphy 0-2, S Dwyer 0-1, E Dwyer 0-1, D Carter 0-1, TJ Lalor 0-1.		C Moorehouse 0-9, M Lee 0-4, A Murphy 0-1, M Lennon 0-1.

26 October 2014 Quarter-final	Kiltale	3–15 – 1–10	Shamrocks	St. Loman's Park
	M O'Sullivan 1-4, J Regan 0-7, P Durnin 1-2, K Ryan 1-1, J Kelly 0-1.		J Moorehouse 1-1, B Jacob 0-2, H Goff 0-2, J O'Connor 0-2, A Wallace 0-1, K Cullen 0-1, J Jacob 0-1.

26 October 2014 Quarter-final	Coill Dubh	1–12 – 0–07	Setanta	St. Conleth's Park
		Report

=== Leinster semi-finals ===
8 November 2014 Semi-final	Ballinakill	1–10 – 1–13	Kiltale	O'Moore Park
	C Dwyer 1-8, MJ Dunphy 0-1, E Dwyer 0-1.		J Regan 0-7, P Durnin 1-3, K Ryan 0-1, P Kelly 0-1, M O'Sullivan 0-1.

16 November 2014 Semi-final	Coill Dubh	1–08 – 2–19	Mullinavat	St. Conleth's Park
	M Delaney (1-2, frees); J Byrne (0-4); T Byrne, D Behan (0-1 each).	Report	J Fennelly (2-1); W O’Dwyer (0-3); I Duggan (0-3); G Malone (0-3); J Walsh (0-3, one free); J Gahan, P Raftice (0-2 each); R Malone (0-1); S Aylward (0-1, 65).	Referee: P Murphy

=== Leinster final ===
23 November 2014 Final	Mullinavat	1–13 – 0–13	Kiltale	Páirc Tailteann
	J Walsh 0-5 (3fs, 1 ‘65’), Jamie Fennelly 1-0, W O’Dwyer, L Fennelly, T Alyward (2fs) 0-2 each, J Gahan, I Duggan 0-1 each.	Report	J Regan 0-6 (5fs), M O’Sullivan 0-4, J Kelly, P Durnin, Ross Ryan 0-1 each.	Referee: J Heffernan (Wexford)

== Munster Intermediate Club Hurling Championship ==
Quarter-finals

26 October 2014 Quarter-final	Lixnaw	3–11 – 1–14	Ballyhea	Mallow GAA Complex, Mallow
	J Flaherty 2-2; M Conway 0-7 (four frees); D Shanahan 1-0; J Buckley, R Heffernan 0-1 each.	Report	M O’Sullivan 1-7 (five frees), J Morrissey, K Morrissey 0-2 each; D Copps, E O’Leary E Morrissey 0-1 each.	Referee: D Fox (Clare)

26 October 2014 Quarter-final	Cappoquin	w/o – scr.	Tipperary champions

Semi-finals

9 November 2014 Semi-final	Lixnaw	2–10 – 2–13	Bruff	Austin Stack Park, Tralee
	R Heffernan 0-7 (0-6 frees, 0-1 ‘65), M Conway 1-1, J Flaherty 1-0, B Brosnan 0-1 free, J Griffin 0-1	Report	S Finn (1-3), C Browne (1-2), S Bulfin (0-5, 1 pen, 1f, 1 '65'), T Burke (0-2), P Browne (0-1).	Referee: P Foley (Waterford)

9 November 2014 Semi-final	Cappoquin	1-14 - 0-16	Feakle	O'Garney Park, Sixmilebridge
	S O'Rourke 0-11, A Molumphy 1-0, P Murray 0-2, F Murray 0-1.		S McGrath 0-6, O Donnellan 0-3, H Hayes 0-2, R Bane 0-2, C Nelson 0-2, G Guilfoyle 0-1.	Referee: N Wall (Cork)

Final

22 November 2014 Final	Cappoquin	1–11 – 0–13	Bruff	Mallow GAA Complex, Mallow
	S O'Rourke 0-5 (3fs, 0-1 65), K O'Sullivan 1-2, F Murray 0-2, P Murray, K Landers 0-1 each.	Report	S Bulfin 0-6 (4fs), J Hayes 0-3, C Madden 0-2, P Browne, C Browne 0-1 each.	Referee: D Kirwan (Cork)

== Ulster Intermediate Club Hurling Championship ==
=== Ulster quarter-finals ===
5 October 2014 Quarter-final	Burt	3–07 – 1–17	O'Donovan Rossa	MacCumhaill Park

5 October 2014 Quarter-final	Bredagh	3–08 – 4–06	Eoghan Rua	St. Patrick's Park

=== Ulster semi-finals ===
12 October 2014 Semi-final	O'Donovan Rossa	1–16 – 0–15	Keady Lámh Dhearg	O'Neill Park
	S Beattie 1-3.

12 October 2014 Semi-final	Eire Óg Carrickmore	0–13 – 2–10	Eoghan Rua	Owenbeg COE
		Report

=== Ulster final ===
26 October 2014 Final	O'Donovan Rossa	1–15 – 0–06	Eoghan Rua	Owenbeg COE
	S Shannon 0-5, S Beattie 1-2, J McGuinness 0-2, S Shannon 0-2, M Armstrong 0-2, C McGuinness 0-1, N Devlin 0-1.	Report	C McGoldrick 0-2, A Rafferty 0-2, O Rafferty 0-1, C McGoldrick 0-1.	Referee: J Clarke (Cavan)

== All-Ireland Intermediate Club Hurling Championship ==
=== All-Ireland quarter-final ===
6 December 2014 Semi-final	Kilburn Gaels	1–10 – 1–08	Mullinavat	Emerald GAA Grounds
	S Lambert (1–7, 5 f, 1 65‘), M Duggan (0–1, 1f), K Killilea (0–1).	Report	W O’Dwyer (1–3), J Walsh (0–4, 2f), J Fennelly (0–1).

=== All-Ireland semi-finals ===
25 January 2015 Semi-final	Kilburn Gaels	0–11 – 0–10	Cappataggle	Gaelic Grounds
	S Lambert 0–6 (4f, 2’65), J Egan 0–2, M Duggan 0–2, K Killilea 0–1.	Report	A Dolan 0–7 (5f), D Dolan 0–2, J Skehill 0–1 (1f).

25 January 2015 Semi-final	O’Donovan Rossa	2–12 – 1–09	Cappoquin	Cusack Park
	T Morgan 2–3 (2fs); S Shannon 0–4 (2 65s); J McGuinness 0–2; M Armstrong, D Murphy, C McVeigh 0–1 each.	Report	A O'Sullivan 1–0; S O'Rourke 0–4 (4fs); A Molumby, P Murray, F Murray, K O'Sullivan, K Landers (f) 0–1 each.

=== All-Ireland final ===
15 February 2015 Final	O’Donovan Rossa	1–09 – 2–03	Kilburn Gaels	Croke Park
	G Walsh (0–3, 0–1 free), S Beatty (1–0), Sean Shannon (0–2, 0–2 free), Stephen Shannon (0–2, 0–2 ‘65s’), D Murphy, M Armstrong (0–1 each).	Report	K Killilea (2–1), S Lambert (0–1, 0–1 free), H Vaughan (0–1).

== Championship statistics ==
=== Miscellaneous ===
- A fixtures backlog in the Tipperary Intermediate Hurling Championship resulted in Cappoquin being handed a walkover in the Munster quarter-final. Moyne-Templetuohy eventually won the county championship but were denied reentry to the provincial championship.
