= 2018–19 All-Ireland Intermediate Club Hurling Championship =

Championship Details
- Dates: 14 October 2018 - 10 February 2019
- Teams: 24

All Ireland Champions
- Winners: Oranmore-Maree (1st win)
- Captain: Gearóid McInerney & Niall Burke
- Manager: Gerry McInerney

All Ireland Runners-up
- Runners-up: Charleville
- Captain: Daniel O'Flynn
- Manager: John Moloney

Provincial Champions
- Munster: Charleville
- Leinster: Graigue-Ballycallan
- Ulster: St. Gall's
- Connacht: Oranmore-Maree

Championship Statistics
- Matches Played: 23
- Total Goals: 61 (2.65 per game)
- Total Points: 668 (29.04 per game)
- Top Scorer: Conor Murphy (0-40)

The 2018–19 All-Ireland Intermediate Club Hurling Championship was the 15th staging of the All-Ireland Intermediate Club Hurling Championship, the Gaelic Athletic Association's intermediate inter-county club hurling tournament. The championship began on 14 October 2018 and ended on 10 February 2019.

On 10 February 2019, Oranmore-Maree won the championship following a 2-18 to 1-15 defeat of Charleville in the All-Ireland final. This was their first All-Ireland title in the grade.

Graigue-Ballycallan's Conor Murphy was the championship's top scorer with 0-40.

== Format change ==
Prior to the 2018-19 All-Ireland Championship, the London champions received a bye to the All-Ireland quarter-final stage where they played one of the provincial champions on a year-to-year rotational basis. As of 2018, the London champions were allowed to join the Connacht Championship.

== Provincial championships ==
=== Connacht Intermediate Club Hurling Championship ===
Quarter-final

28 October 2018 Quarter-final	Athleague	1-09 - 0-17	Tooreen	Athleague Sportsfield, Athleague
	E Flanagan (0-7), C Murray (1-0), D Flaherty (0-1), B McGahon (0-1).	Report	S Boland (0-12), S Kenny (0-3), B Morley (0-1), F Boland (0-1).	Referee: K Collins (Galway)

Semi-final

10 November 2018 Semi-final	St. Gabriel's	1-13 - 0-18	Tooreen	McGovern Park, Ruislip
	D Nolan (0-10, 6f), S Lawless (1-1), S Lohan (0-1), B Hickey (0-1).	Report	S Boland (0-6, 5f), F Boland (0-4), S Kenny (0-3), S Regan (0-2), B Morley (0-1), C Freeman (0-1), D Harrison (0-1).	Referee: L Gordon (Galway)

Final

24 November 2018 Final	Oranmore-Maree	1-20 - 1-15	Tooreen	Athleague Sportsfield, Athleague
	N Burke 1-10 (0-4fs, 0-1 ‘65’), R Malone, A Burke 0-3 each, S McInerney 0-2 each, P Keane, G McInerney 0-1 each.	Report	S Boland 1-9 (0-8fs), S Kenny 0-3 (2f), F Boland, D Huane, C English 0-1 each.	Referee: J Keenan (Wicklow)

=== Leinster Intermediate Club Hurling Championship ===
Quarter-finals

3 November 2018 Quarter-final	St. Mogue's	2-09 - 2-05	Kiltale	Innovate Wexford Park, Wexford
	M Wallace (0-5 frees), J Tubritt (1-1), B Power (1-0), J Sutton (0-1), G Foley (0-1); C Dwyer (0-1).	Report	A Forde (1-1), J Regan (0-4 frees), P Durnin (1-0).	Referee: P Murphy (Carlow)

3 November 2018 Quarter-final	Graigue-Ballycallan	0-16 - 0-13	Celbridge	Nowlan Park, Kilkenny
	C Murphy (0-10, 0-9 frees); E Brennan, B Ryan (0-2 each); A Brennan, S O’Dwyer (0-1 each).	Report	B White (0-6, 0-5 frees); T Fitzgerald (0-3); M Moloney (0-2); S White, F Conway (0-1 each).

3 November 2018 Quarter-final	Glenealy	1-10 - 0-16	Portlaoise	Joule Park, Aughrim
	J O’Neill 0-7 (0-5 frees, 0-1 65), D Staunton 1-0 (pen), G Weir 0-2, R Byrne 0-1.	Report	C Rigney 0-4 (0-2 frees, 0-1 65), G Bergin, C Duggan, C Taylor 0-3 each, T Fitzgerald 0-2, C Healy 0-1.	Referee: S Stack (Dublin)

3 November 2018 Quarter-final	Faughs	2-11 - 3-16	Ballinamere	Parnell Park, Dublin

Semi-finals

17 November 2018 Semi-final	St. Mogue's	1-11 - 2-22	Graigue-Ballycallan	Innovate Wexford Park, Wexford
	M Wallace (0-5, 4 frees), M Dwyer (1-1), G Foley (0-3); R Waters (0-1); J Sutton (0-1).	Report	C Murphy (0-12, 9 frees, 2 '65s), S Ryan (1-2), E Brennan (1-1), A Brennan (0-4), B Ryan (0-2); S O'Dwyer (0-1).	Referee: S Stack (Dublin)

17 November 2018 Semi-final	Portlaoise	3-12 - 2-11	Ballinamere	O'Moore Park, Portlaoise
	C Taylor 1-3 (one free), T Fitzgerald 1-2, C Duggan 1-0, C Rigney 0-3 (two frees), D O’Mahoney 0-2, G Bergin 0-2, C Healy 0-1.	Report	B Duigan 1-6 (four frees, one ’65), P Murphy 1-3, K McDermott 0-1, J Maher 0-1.	Referee: P Burke (Kilkenny)

Final

1 December 2018 Final	Graigue-Ballycallan	2-17 - 0-15	Portlaoise	Nowlan Park, Kilkenny
	C Murphy 0-9 (0-8f), A Brennan 1-3, E Brennan 1-1, S Ryan 0-4.	Report	C Rigney 0-6 (0-4f), D O’Mahony 0-3, C Duggan and T Fitzgerald 0-2 each, C Taylor and C Gleeson 0-1 each.	Referee: G McGrath (Wexford)

=== Munster Intermediate Club Hurling Championship ===
Quarter-finals

28 October 2018 Quarter-final	Clonea	1-25 - 1-10	Garryspillane	Fraher Field, Dungarvan
	B Power 0-7, R Power 1-2, J Gleeson 0-5, S Clancy 0-3, R Flynn 0-2, M Curry 0-2, M Sexton 0-2, C Power 0-1, C Dalton 0-1.		D Ryan 0-5, C Ryan 0-4, D Hayes 1-0, D O'Shea 0-1.	Referee: N Wall (Cork)

28 October 2018 Quarter-final	Lixnaw	1-16 - 1-13	Cashel King Cormacs	Hermitage Park, Lixnaw
	S Conway 0-13, C Sheehy 1-2, J Buckley 0-1.		E Connolly 0-6, R Bonnar 1-2, C Bonnar 0-4, S Delaney 0-1.	Referee: T Walsh (Waterford)

Semi-finals

3 November 2018 Semi-final	Feakle	5-15 - 2-15	Clonea	Fraher Field, Dungarvan
	S McGrath 1-9, R Bane 3-0, A McMahon 1-1, O Donnellan 0-2, M Daly 0-1, G Guilfoyle 0-1, C Smyth 0-1.		C Dalton 1-4, B Power 1-4, R Cahill 0-3, R Power 0-2, M Curry 0-1, M Sexton 0-1.	Referee: P Kelly (Tipperary)

3 November 2018 Semi-final	Lixnaw	0-11 - 1-17	Charleville	Hermitage Park, Lixnaw
	S Conway (0-8 0-7 frees), B Brosnan (0-1), J Buckley (0-1), C Sheehy (0-1)	Report	D Fitzgibbon (0-6 0-2 frees), M Kavanagh (0-5 0-4 frees), K O Connor (1-0), C Buckley (0-2), J Doyle (0-2), A Cagney (0-1), F Cagney (0-1).	Referee: R McGann (Clare)

Final

18 November 2018 Final	Charleville	2-20 - 1-20	Feakle	Gaelic Grounds, Limerick
	D Fitzgibbon (0-9, 0-3 frees, 0-1 ’65); J Doyle, D Casey (1-1 each); M Kavanagh (0-1 free), K O’Connor (0-2 each); C Buckley (0-1), D O’Flynn (0-1 each).	Report	S McGrath (0-9, 0-7 frees); O Donnellan (0-6); G Guilfoyle (0-3); R Bane (1-0); S Conway, M Daly (0-1 each).	Referee: K Jordan (Tipperary)

=== Ulster Intermediate Club Hurling Championship ===
Quarter-finals

14 October 2018 Quarter-final	Lisbellaw St. Patrick's	1-16 - 2-19	St. Gall's	Brewster Park, Enniskillen
	S Curran (1-6, 0-5fs), R Bogue (0-4, 0-2fs), Caolan Duffy (0-3), B McPhillips (0-1), C McShea (0-1); JP McGarry (0-1).	Report	CJ McGourty (0-8, 0-4s), S McAreavey (1-0), M Napier (1-0), N O’Neill (0-3), K Stewart (0-3, 0-1f); K McGourty (0-2), J McGreevy (0-1); T Ó Ciaráin (0-1); A Healy (0-1).	Referee: J Clarke (Cavan)

14 October 2018 Quarter-final	Dungannon Eoghan Ruadh	1-10 - 0-15	Keady Lámh Dhearg	O'Neill Park, Dungannon
	D Casey 0-7, K Morgan 1-0, T Morgan 0-2, B Molloy 0-1.		C Corvan 0-9, J Corvan 0-2, J Harvey 0-1, P Green 0-1, P Breen 0-1, J Shortt 0-1.	Referee: A Ferguson

Semi-finals

28 October 2018 Semi-final	Liatroim Fontenoys	0-12 - 3-14	Keady Lámh Dhearg	Corrigan Park, Belfast
				Referee: J Connors

28 October 2018 Semi-final	Swatragh	2-20 - 3-22	St. Gall's	Owenbeg
	E O’Kane (1-6); R Convery (0-9, 0-9fs), F McGurk (1-1), D Quinn (0-2), SM Quinn (0-2, 0-1f).	Report	CJ McGourty (1-6, 0-2fs), T Ó Ciarain (0-8, 0-1f); C Burke (1-1), K Stewart (1-1), K McGourty (0-3), A Healy (0-1), S McAreavey (0-1), M Napier (0-1).	Referee: C Murray (Down)

Final

11 November 2018 Final	Keady Lámh Dhearg	0-11 - 2-12	St. Gall's	Páirc Esler, Newry
	C Corvan 0-6 (1f, one '65'), P Green 0-2, J King, P Breen, S Renaghan 0-1 each.	Report	CJ McGourty 1-5 (4f), S McAreavey 1-0, T O Ciarain 0-3 (3f), K McGourty, M Napier, K Stewart, J McGreevy 0-1 each.	Referee: B Winters (Tyrone)

== All-Ireland Intermediate Club Hurling Championship ==
Semi-finals

19 January 2019 Semi-final	Graigue-Ballycallan	1-13 - 1-15	Charleville	Semple Stadium, Thurles
	C Murphy (0-9, 7 frees); A Brennan (1-2); S Ryan, B Ryan (0-1 each).	Report	D Fitzgibbon (0-6, 2f); A Cagney (1-2, 1f); J Doyle (0-4); J O’Callaghan (0-2); K O’Connor (0-1).	Referee: L Gordon (Galway)

20 January 2019 Semi-final	Oranmore-Maree	1-13 - 2-04	St. Gall's	Parnell Park, Dublin
	N Burke (0-11, 9 frees, 1 65); S McInerney (1-0), R Malone (0-1), A Burke (0-1).	Report	CJ McGourty (1-3 0-2 frees); A McCaffrey (1-0), S McAreavey (0-1).	Referee: P Murphy (Carlow)

Final

10 February 2019 Final	Charleville	1-15 - 2-18	Oranmore-Maree	Croke Park, Dublin
	D Fitzgibbon (0-10, 7 frees, 1 '65'); A Cagney (1-1); K O'Connor, J Doyle, D O'Flynn and C Buckley (all 0-1).	Report	N Burke (1-11, 6 frees, 1 '65', 1-0 penalty); S McInerney (1-2); A Bannon (0-2); G McInerney, P Keane and E Burke (all 0-1).	Referee: C Cunning (Antrim)

== Championship statistics ==
=== Top scorers ===
Overall

Rank	Player	Club	Tally	Total	Matches	Average
1	Conor Murphy	Graigue-Ballycallan	0-40	40	4	10.00
2	Niall Burke	Oranmore-Maree	2-32	38	3	12.66
3	C. J. McGourty	St. Gall's	3-22	31	4	7.75
3	Darragh Fitzgibbon	Charleville	0-31	31	4	7.75
5	Conor Corvan	Keady Lámh Dhearg	0-22	22	3	7.33
6	Shane McGrath	Feakle	1-18	21	2	10.50
6	Shane Conway	Lixnaw	0-21	21	2	10.50
