= 2012–13 All-Ireland Intermediate Club Hurling Championship =

Championship Details
- Dates: 7 October 2012 – 10 February 2013

All Ireland Champions
- Winners: Clara (1st win)
- Captain: David Langton
- Manager: Robert Shortall

All Ireland Runners-up
- Runners-up: St. Gabriel's
- Captain: Aidan Ryan
- Manager: Tommy Duane

Provincial Champions
- Munster: Silvermines
- Leinster: Mount Leinster Rangers
- Ulster: Lisbellaw St Patrick's
- Connacht: Killimordaly

Championship Statistics
- Top Scorer: Keith Hogan (2-33)

The 2012–13 All-Ireland Intermediate Club Hurling Championship was the ninth staging of the All-Ireland Intermediate Club Hurling Championship since its establishment by the Gaelic Athletic Association in 2004. The competition ran from 7 October 2012 to 10 February 2013.

The All-Ireland final was played on 10 February 2013 at Croke Park in Dublin, between Clara of Kilkenny and St Gabriel's of London, in what was their first championship meeting. Clara won the match by 1-16 to 0-13 to claim their first title.

Clara's Keith Hogan was the championship's top scorer with 2-33.

== Connacht Intermediate Club Hurling Championship ==
=== Connacht semi-final ===
| 29 October 2012 Semi-final | Four Roads | 1-18 - 0-12 | Ballyhaunis | Athleague Sportsfield |
| | D Dolan 0-8, R Kelly 1-1, M Kelly 0-4, J Coyne 0-3, E Mulry 0-1, S Curley 0-1. | | K Higgins 0-8, S Hoban 0-2, G Keane 0-1, T Buckley 0-1. |

=== Connacht final ===
| 18 November 2012 Final | Four Roads | 0-16 - 0-10 | Killimordaly | Athleague Sportsfield |
| | N Earls 0-6 (3f), P Madden 0-4, E Ryan 0-2, A Daly, D Connolly, C Daly, J McDonagh 0-1 each. | Report | E Rogerson (2f) 0-3, S Curley (2f), P Kelly 0-2 each, J Lawlor, J Coyne, M Kelly (f) 0-1 each. |

== Leinster Intermediate Club Hurling Championship ==
=== Leinster quarter-finals ===
| 28 October 2012 Quarter-final | Confey | 0-14 - 0-17 | Kiltale | Conneff Park |
| | P Divilly 0-8, N Glennon 0-2, D Nolan 0-1, E Fitzpatrick 0-1, Pádraig Keegan 0-1, K Divilly 0-1. | | J Regan 0-11, P Durnin 0-3, A Forde 0-2, J Kelly 0-1. | Referee: G McGrath (Dublin) |

| 4 November 2012 Quarter-final | Glenealy | 0-10 - 0-15 | St Oliver Plunkett's/Eoghan Ruadh | Aughrim County Ground |
| | | | S Mullen 0-9, |

=== Leinster semi-finals ===
| 11 November 2012 Semi-final | Kiltale | 2-13 - 3-12 | Oylegate–Glenbrien | Páirc Tailteann |
| | J Regan 1-9, J Donoghue 1-0, P Durnin 0-2, M O'Sullivan 0-1, A Forde 0-1. | | F Doran 0-8, J Reck 2-1, P Doran 1-2, MJ Reck 0-1. | Referee: P Murphy (Carlow) |

| 24 November 2012 Semi-final | St Oliver Plunkett's/Eoghan Ruadh | 1-12 - 0-08 | Clara | Blakestown Road |
| | K Hogan 1-5, J Nolan 0-3, C Phelan 0-2, Liam Ryan 0-1, Lester Ryan 0-1. | | S Mullin 0-4, P Bergin 0-1, K Sexton 0-1. |

=== Leinster final ===
| 2 December 2012 Final | Clara | 3-20 - 0-05 | Oylegate–Glenbrien | Nowlan Park |
| | K Hogan 0-9, B O'Shea 2-0, Liam Ryan 0-4, A Murphy 1-0, K Phelan 0-2, Lester Ryan 0-1, C Phelan 0-1, C Bolger 0-1, J Nolan 0-1, T Ryan 0-1. | | F Doran 0-5. | Referee: P Murphy (Carlow) |

== Munster Intermediate Club Hurling Championship ==
=== Munster quarter-finals ===
| 28 October 2012 Quarter-final | Ruan | 0-06 - 1-15 | Silvermines | O'Garney Park |
| | J Punch 0-2, C Howard 0-1, A Lynch 0-1, J Clohessy 0-1, K Ryan 0-1. | | J Forde 1-7, Daniel Keogh 0-3, David Keogh 0-1, W Keogh 0-1, D Boland 0-1, C Gleeson 0-1, O Quirke 0-1. | Referee: S Hourigan (Limerick) |

| 29 October 2012 Quarter-final | Ballinhassig | 1-17 - 0-20 (aet) | Ballybrown | Páirc Uí Rinn, Cork |
| | D Dineen 0-10, M Coleman 1-0, S Dineen 0-2, F O'Leary 0-2, M Sheehan 0-1, S McCarthy 0-1, P Coomey 0-1. | | A O'Connor 0-12, S Kenny 0-4, J Hall 0-2, K Loftus 0-1, M Kiely 0-1. | Referee: F Horgan (Tipperary) |

| 4 November 2012 Quarter-final replay | Ballybrown | 3-10 - 2-07 | Ballinhassig | FitzGerald Park |
| | A O'Connor 1-7, B Griffin 1-0, D Hall 1-0, K Loftus 0-1, L Doolan 0-1, J Hall 0-1. | | M Coleman 2-0, F O'Leary 0-4, D Dineen 0-3. | Referee: J Ryan (Tipperary) |

=== Munster semi-finals ===
| 4 November 2012 Semi-final | Silvermines | 0-13 - 0-11 | An Rinn | Dolla GAA Field |
| | J Forde 0-8, O Quirke 0-3, W Keogh 0-1, S Quirke 0-1. | | D Breathnach 0-6, B Breathnach 0-4, T Ó hUallacháin 0-1. | Referee: D O'Driscoll (Limerick) |

| 10 November 2012 Semi-final | Ballybrown | 0-14 - 2-13 | Ballyduff | FitzGerald Park |
| | A O'Connor 0-6, L Doolin 0-2, S Foster 0-1, B Griffin 0-1, M Kiely 0-1, R Kenny 0-1, S Kenny 0-1, A Cliffe 0-1. | | B O'Sullivan 1-9, G O'Brien 1-0, P Boyle 0-2, M Boyle 0-1, PJ Connolly 0-1. | Referee: P Casey (Waterford) |

=== Munster final ===
| 24 November 2012 Final | Silvermines | 0-14 - 0-08 | Ballyduff | Semple Stadium |
| | J Forde 0-7 (0-3f, 0-1 sideline), David Keogh 0-3, W Keogh 0-2, O Quirke, Daniel Keogh 0-1 each. | Report | P Boyle 0-3 (0-1f), B O’Sullivan 0-2 (0-1f), PJ O’Gorman (0-1 pen), G O’Brien, PJ Connolly 0-1 each. | Referee: D Copps (Cork) |

== Ulster Intermediate Club Hurling Championship ==
=== Ulster quarter-finals ===
| 7 October 2012 Quarter-final | Lisbellaw St Patrick's | 5-11 - 4-07 | Burt | Brewster Park |
| | D McGarry 3-0, S Corrigan 1-5, C Corrigan 1-1, J Duffy 0-4, R Bogue 0-1. | | R McDermott 2-3, M McCann 1-2, E McDermott 1-2. |

| 7 October 2012 Semi-final | St Brigid's Cloughmills | 1-16 - 2-10 | Castleblayney | Casement Park |
| | L Kearns 1-4, S Smith 0-7, M Devlin 0-4, J Doherty 0-1. | Report | H Byrne 1-2, F Rafter 0-5, B Reilly 1-0, G Brady 0-2, J Lacey 0-1. |

=== Ulster semi-final ===
| 21 October 2012 Semi-final | Lisbellaw St Patrick's | 3-14 - 1-09 | Cú Chullains | Páirc Esler |
| | J Duffy 1-6, S Corrigan 1-2, C Corrigan 1-0, P Timoney 0-2, JP McGarry 0-1, D McGarry 0-1, K Kehoe 0-1, R Bogue 0-1. | | C Coulter 0-6, R McGrattan 1-2, C Coulter 1-1. |

- St Brigid's Cloughmills received a bye in this round.

=== Ulster final ===
| 28 October 2012 Final | Lisbellaw St Patrick's | 3-14 - 2-10 | St Brigid's Cloughmills | Páirc Esler |
| | J Duffy 0-7 (6f) S Corrigan, D McGarry 1-2 each, C Corrigan 1-0, A Breslin, M Slevin J P McGarry 0-1 each. | Report | M Devlin 1-3, L Kearns 0-4 (2f), S Smyth 1-0, A Smiley, R Laverty, J Doherty (f) 0-1 each. |

== All-Ireland Intermediate Club Hurling Championship ==
=== All-Ireland quarter-final ===
| 2 December 2012 Quarter-final | St Gabriel’s | 4-17 - 2-07 | Lisbellaw St Patrick's | Emerald GAA Grounds |
| | M Finn 2-9 (0-5f, 0-2 '65'), J Grealish, G Wynne 1-0 each, S Egan, K Walsh, N Rogers 0-2 each, P Sloane, C Sexton 0-1 each. | Report | S Corrigan 1-1, J Duffy 0-4 (3f, 1 '65'), C Rice 1-0, D McGarry 0-2. |

=== All-Ireland semi-finals ===
| 27 January 2013 Semi-final | St Gabriel’s | 2-12 - 2-11 (aet) | Killimordaly | St Brendan's Park |
| | M Finn 1-7 (1-7f), L Hands 1-1, N Rogers 0-2 (1f), S Egan, K Walsh 0-1 each. | Report | E Ryan 0-6 (1f), C Earls 1-1 (1f), P Madden 1-0, N Earls 0-2 (2f), A Daly, I Creaven 0-1. |

| 27 January 2013 Semi-final | Clara | 0-19 - 1-14 (aet) | Silvermines | O'Moore Park |
| | K Hogan 0-10 (7f, 1 65); Liam Ryan 0-3; A Murphy 0-2; C Phelan, Lester Ryan, C Prendergast, C Bolger 0-1 each. | Report | J Forde 0-8 (7f); Daniel Keogh 1-0; David Boland, O Quirke 0-2 each; W Keogh, David Keogh 0-1 each. |

=== All-Ireland final ===
| 10 February 2013 Final | Clara | 1-16 - 011 | St Gabriel’s | Croke Park |
| | K Hogan 1-9, N Prendergast 0-1, D Langton 0-1, J Langton 0-1, Lester Ryan 0-1, Liam Ryan 0-1, B O'Shea 0-1, J Nolan 0-1. | Report | M Finn 0-8, J Grealish 0-2, K Walsh 0-1. |

== Championship statistics ==
=== Top scorers ===
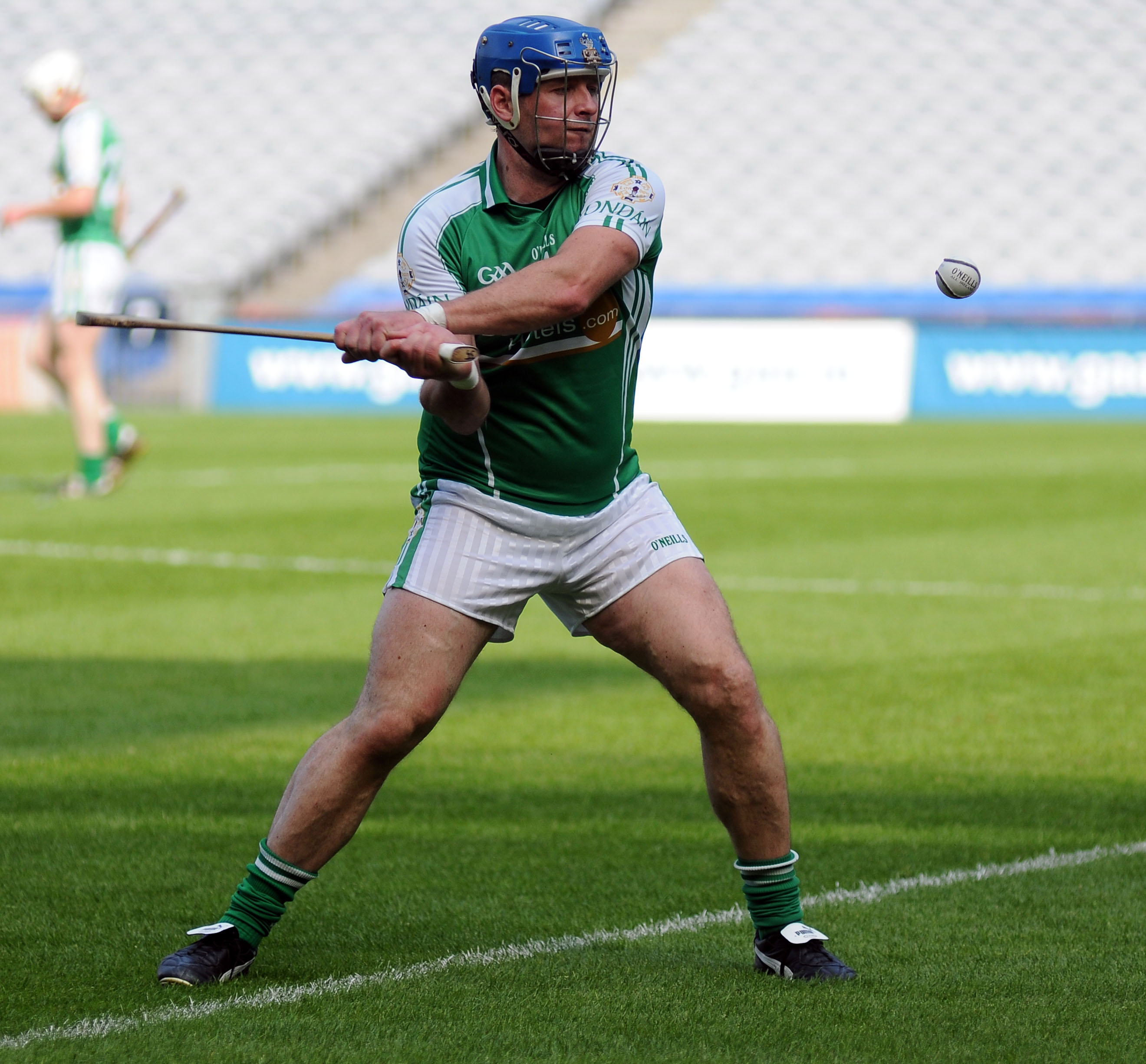
Martin Finn

| Rank | Player | Club | Tally | Total | Matches | Average |
|---|---|---|---|---|---|---|
| 1 | Keith Hogan | Clara | 2-33 | 39 | 4 | 9.75 |
| 2 | Martin Finn | St Gabriel's | 3-24 | 33 | 3 | 11.00 |
| 2 | Jason Forde | Silvermines | 1-30 | 33 | 4 | 8.25 |
| 4 | Alan O'Connor | Ballybrown | 1-25 | 28 | 3 | 9.33 |
| 5 | John Duffy | Lisbellaw St Patrick's | 1-21 | 24 | 4 | 6.00 |
