= Gort na Móna GAC =

Antrim-based Gaelic games club

Gort na Móna
- Gort na Móna
- Founded: 1974
- County: Antrim
- Nickname: Gorts, Mona
- Colours: Maroon, Sky Blue and Saffron
- Grounds: Páirc Mhic Ionnrachtaigh (Enright Park)
- Coordinates: 54°35′22.31″N 5°59′42.25″W

Playing kits
Standard colours

Gort na Móna is a Gaelic Athletic Association club in County Antrim, Northern Ireland. A member of Antrim GAA, it competes in Gaelic football, hurling, camogie and handball. The Irish-language name means "turf field". The club currently competes at Division 1 level in Senior Football and division 2 in hurling.

== History ==
Gort na Móna GAC was established in 1974 at the initiative of Brother Moroney of the Irish Christian Brothers based in the Turf Lodge area of West Belfast. The club was selected as Antrim GAA Club of the Year in 2001, and in the same year, was awarded the Sports Council Junior Clubmark. The club celebrated its 40th anniversary in 2014.

== Hurling ==
Gort na Móna won the Ulster Intermediate Club Hurling Championship for 2006 when on 5 November at St Tiernach's Park, Clones, they defeated the Down club title-holders, Liatroim, on a scoreline of 4-7 to 2-8. They met Liatroim again in the 2008 final and won again, by 3-16 to 0-5.

=== Honours ===
- Ulster Intermediate Club Hurling Championship (2)
  - 2006, 2008
- Antrim Intermediate Hurling Championship (4)
  - 1989, 1996, 2006, 2008
- Antrim Junior Hurling Championship (4)
  - 1984, 1990, 2017, 2019
- Antrim All-County Hurling League Division 2 (1)
  - 1999
- Antrim All-County Hurling League Division 3 (1)
  - 2019

== Football ==
In Gaelic football the club's senior team secured promotion in 2007 for the first time to the top tier of Antrim football.

=== Honours ===
- Antrim Intermediate Football Championship (1)
  - 2005
- Antrim Junior Football Championship (1)
  - 1989
- Antrim Under 21 Football Championship (1)
  - 2007
- Antrim Minor Football Championship (1)
  - 2004
- Antrim All-County Football League Division 2 (3)
  - 1996, 2006, 2018
- Reserve Football Shield (1)
  - 2016
- Antrim All-County Reserve Football League Division 2 (1)
  - 2016
- Beringer Cup (3)
  - 1996, 2000, 2018
- Martin Cup (4)
  - 1984, 2004, 2015, 2018

== Camogie ==
=== Honours ===
- Antrim Junior Championship Shield (1)
  - 2007
- Antrim All-County Camogie League Division 3 (2)
  - 2015, 2022

== Ladies' Football ==
=== Honours ===
- Antrim Junior Championship (1)
  - 2020
- Antrim All-County Football League Division 2 (1)
  - 2017

== Handball ==
=== Honours ===
- All-Ireland Club Handball Championship (2)
  - 1999, 2000

== See also ==
- Gort Na Móna Secondary School
