= Ulster Intermediate Club Hurling Championship =

Annual hurling competition

Ulster GAA Hurling Intermediate Club Championship
- Current season or competition: 2026 Ulster Intermediate Club Hurling Championship
- Irish: Craobh Iománaíochta Idirmheánach Ulaidh na gClub
- Code: Hurling
- Founded: 2004; 22 years ago
- Region: Ulster (GAA)
- No. of teams: 8
- Title holders: Éire Óg Carrickmore (1st title)
- Most titles: Gort na Móna; St. Gall's; Middletown Na Fianna (2 titles)
- Sponsors: Allied Irish Banks

The Ulster Intermediate Club Hurling Championship (known for sponsorship reasons as the AIB Ulster GAA Hurling Intermediate Club Championship; abbreviated as the Ulster Club IHC) is an annual hurling competition organised by the Ulster Council of the Gaelic Athletic Association and contested by the champion intermediate clubs and, in some cases, champion senior clubs in the province of Ulster in Ireland.

The Ulster Intermediate Club Championship was introduced in 2004. In its current format, the championship begins in late October or early November and is usually played over a four-week period. The seven participating club teams compete in a straight knockout competition that culminates with the Ulster final for the two remaining teams. The winner of the Ulster Intermediate Championship qualifies for the subsequent All-Ireland Club Championship.

The competition has been won by 16 club teams, while Gort na Móna, St. Gall's and Middletown Na Fianna are the only clubs to have won the title more than once. Antrim clubs have accumulated the highest number of victories with 12 wins.

Éire Óg Carrickmore are the reigning champions, having beaten Lisbellaw St Patrick's on a score of 1-18 to 0-15 in the 2025 final in Clones

== Format ==
=== Overview ===
The Ulster Championship is a single elimination tournament. Each team is afforded only one defeat before being eliminated from the championship. Pairings for matches are drawn at random and there is no seeding.

Each match is played as a single leg. If a match is drawn there is a period of extra time, however, if both sides are still level at the end of extra time penalties are taken to determine a winner.

=== Competition format ===
Quarter-final: Six teams contest this round. The three winning teams advance directly to the semi-final stage. The three losing teams are eliminated from the championship.

Semi-finals: Four teams contest this round; the three winning teams from the quarter-finals and one team who receives a bye. The two winning teams advance directly to the final. The two losing teams are eliminated from the championship.

Final: The final is contested by the two semi-final winners.

== Teams ==
=== Qualification ===
County	Championship	Qualifying team
Antrim	Antrim Intermediate Hurling Championship	Champions
Armagh	Armagh Senior Hurling Championship	Champions
Derry	Derry Intermediate Hurling Championship	Champions
Donegal	Donegal Intermediate Hurling Championship	Champions
Down	Down Intermediate Hurling Championship	Champions
Fermanagh	Fermanagh Senior Hurling Championship	Champions
Monaghan	Monaghan Senior Hurling Championship	Champions
Tyrone	Tyrone Senior Hurling Championship	Champions

=== 2024 teams ===
39 clubs will compete in the 2024 Ulster Intermediate Club Hurling Championship:

County	No.	Clubs competing in county championship
Antrim	8	**Carey Faughs**, Clooney Gaels, Con Magee's, Oisin's Glenariff, Patrick Sarsfields, Robert Emmets, Shane O'Neill's, St Brigid's Cloughmills, St Gall's, St Paul's, Tír na nÓg
Armagh	6	Craobh Rua, Cúchulainn's, Derrynoose, Keady Lámh Dhearg, Killeavy St Moninna's, **Middletown**
Derry	8	Ballinascreen, Banagher, Eoghan Rua, Kevin Lynch's, Lavey, Na Magha, Slaughtneil, **Swatragh**
Donegal	8	An Clochán Liath, Aodh Ruadh, Buncrana, **Burt**, Carndonagh, Seán MacCumhaills, Setanta, St Eunan's
Down	6	
Fermanagh	1	**Lisbellaw St Patrick's**
Monaghan	6	Carrickmacross, **Castleblayney**, Clontibret O'Neills, Inniskeen Grattans, Monaghan Harps, Truagh
Tyrone	2	**Éire Óg Carrickmore**, Eoghan Ruadh Dungannon

Note: Bold indicates county representatives.

== Roll of honour ==
=== Performances by club ===
#	Club	County	Titles	Runners-up	Years won	Years runners-up
1	Middletown	ARM	2	2	2011, 2017	2009, 2022
1	Gort na Móna	ANT	2	0	2006, 2008	—
1	St Gall's	ANT	2	0	2009, 2018	—
1	Carey Faughs	ANT	2	0	2004, 2024	—
5	Liatrom Fontenoys	DOW	1	3	2022	2006, 2007, 2008
5	Éire Óg Carrickmore	TYR	1	3	2025	2010, 2015, 2023
5	Keady Lámh Dhearg	ARM	1	2	2007	2005, 2018
5	Lisbellaw St Patrick's	FER	1	2	2012	2021, 2025
5	St Brigid's Cloughmills	ANT	1	1	2016	2012
5	Glenariffe Oisín	ANT	1	0	2005	—
5	St John's	ANT	1	0	2010	—
5	Clooney Gaels	ANT	1	0	2013	—
5	O'Donovan Rossa	ANT	1	0	2014	—
5	Creggan Kickhams	ANT	1	0	2015	—
5	Naomh Éanna	ANT	1	0	2019	—
5	Banagher	DER	1	0	2021	—
5	Setanta	DON	1	0	2023	—
18	Eoghan Rua	DER	0	3	—	2004, 2014, 2016
18	Castleblayney Hurling Club	MON	0	1	—	2011
18	Cuchullians	ARM	0	1	—	2013
18	Lavey	DER	0	1	—	2017
18	Eoghan Ruadh	TYR	0	1	—	2019
18	Swatragh	DER	0	1	—	2024

=== Performances by county ===
#	County	Wins	Runners-up	Years won	Years Runners-Up
1	Antrim	13	1	2004, 2005, 2006, 2008, 2009, 2010, 2013, 2014, 2015, 2016, 2018, 2019, 2024	2012
2	Armagh	3	5	2007, 2011, 2017	2005, 2009, 2013, 2018, 2022
3	Derry	1	5	2021	2004, 2014, 2016, 2017, 2024
4	Tyrone	1	4	2025	2010, 2015, 2019, 2023
5	Down	1	3	2022	2006, 2007, 2008
6	Fermanagh	1	2	2012	2021,2025
7	Donegal	1	0	2023	—
8	Monaghan	0	1	—	2011

== List of Finals ==
=== List of Ulster IHC finals ===
Year	Winners			Runners-up			Venue
Year	County	Club	Score	County	Club	Score	Venue
2025	TYR	Éire Óg Carrickmore	1-18	FER	Lisbellaw St Patrick's	0-15	St Tiernach’s Park
2024	ANT	Carey Faughs	1–11	DER	Swatragh	0–13	St Patrick's Park
2023	DON	Setanta	1–16	TYR	Éire Óg Carrickmore	2–11	Owenbeg
2022	DOW	Liatrom Fontenoys	2–20	ARM	Middletown	0–20	Corrigan Park
2021	DER	Banagher	2–11	FER	Lisbellaw St Patrick's	0–12	Healy Park
2020	Cancelled due to COVID-19 pandemic						
2019	ANT	Naomh Éanna	2–20	TYR	Eoghan Ruadh	2–20	Celtic Park
2018	ANT	St Gall's	2–12	ARM	Keady Lámh Dhearg	0–11	Páirc Esler
2017	ARM	Middletown	2–16	DER	Lavey	2–13	Corrigan Park
2016	ANT	St Brigid's Cloughmills	1–11	DER	Eoghan Rua	2–06	Slemish Park
2015	ANT	Creggan Kickhams	2–12	TYR	Éire Óg Carrickmore	1–07	Owenbeg COE
2014	ANT	O'Donovan Rossa	1–15	DER	Eoghan Rua	0–06	Owenbeg COE
2013	ANT	Clooney Gaels	1–16	ARM	Cuchullians	1–14	Celtic Park
2012	FER	Lisbellaw St Patrick's	3–14	ANT	St Brigid's Cloughmills	2–10	Páirc Esler
2011	ARM	Middletown Na Fianna	5–29	MON	Castleblayney Hurling Club	0–05	
2010	ANT	St John's	2–11	TYR	Éire Óg Carrickmore	1–11	Casement Park
2009	ANT	St Gall's	5–11	ARM	Middletown	0–12	Páirc Esler
2008	ANT	Gort na Móna	3–16	DOW	Liatroim Fontenoys	0–05	Páirc Esler
2007	ARM	Keady Lámh Dhearg		DOW	Liatroim Fontenoys		Casement Park
2006	ANT	Gort na Móna	4–07	DOW	Liatroim Fontenoys	2–08	St. Tiernach's Park
2005	ANT	Glenariffe Oisín	0-16	ARM	Keady Lámh Dhearg	0-15	O'Neill Park
2004	ANT	Carey Faughs	0–07	DER	Eoghan Rua	0–06	St. Patrick's Park

=== Notes ===
- 2019: Naomh Eanna won 1-0 on penalties

== Records and statistics ==
=== County representatives and provincial champions by year ===
Provincial winners are shaded in gold.

Year	Antrim	Armagh	Derry	Donegal	Down	Fermanagh	Monaghan	Tyrone
2025	Glenariffe Oisín	Middletown	Swatragh	St Eunan's	Liatroim Fontenoys	Lisbellaw St Patrick's	Castleblayney	Éire Óg Carrickmore
2024	Carey Faughs	Middletown	Swatragh	Burt	Bredagh	Lisbellaw St Patrick's	Castleblayney	Éire Óg Carrickmore
2023	Kickhams Creggan	Middletown	Ballinascreen	Setanta	Bredagh	Lisbellaw St Patrick's	Inniskeen Grattans	Éire Óg Carrickmore
2022	Clooney Gaels	Middletown	Eoghan Rua	N / A	Liatroim Fontenoys	Lisbellaw St Patrick's	Castleblayney	Éire Óg Carrickmore
2021	Carey Faughs	Middletown	Banagher	N / A	Newry Shamrocks	Lisbellaw St Patrick's	Castleblayney	Éire Óg Carrickmore
2020	No championship							

== See also ==
- All-Ireland Intermediate Club Hurling Championship
- Ulster Senior Club Hurling Championship
- Ulster Junior Club Hurling Championship
