= All-Ireland Intermediate Club Hurling Championship =

Hurling competition

GAA Hurling All-Ireland Intermediate Club Championship
- Current season or competition: 2026–27 All-Ireland Intermediate Club Hurling Championship
- Irish: Craobh Idirmhéanach Iomáint Chlub na hÉireann
- Code: Hurling
- Founded: 2004–05
- Region: Ireland (GAA)
- No. of teams: 4
- Title holders: Upperchurch-Drombane (1st title)
- Most titles: 1 (shared by 21 clubs)
- Sponsors: Allied Irish Banks

The GAA Hurling All-Ireland Intermediate Club Championship (also known as the All-Ireland Intermediate Club Hurling Championship, for short the All-Ireland Club IHC) is an annual Irish hurling competition organised by the Gaelic Athletic Association (GAA). It is the intermediate-grade All-Ireland championship for clubs, and has been contested every year since the 2004–05 championship.

The All-Ireland series is contested by the four provincial champions from the Connacht, Leinster, Munster and Ulster intermediate club championships. The competition is played on a straight knockout basis.

The most successful county is Kilkenny, with eight titles, while no club has won the championship more than once.

Upperchurch–Drombane are the title holders, defeating Tooreen in the 2026 final.

== History ==
While the senior club championship had been running since the 1970–71 season, the creation of an All-Ireland series at intermediate level was a natural progression. The Munster Council were the first to organise a provincial intermediate championship in 2003. They were followed by the other three provincial councils in 2004, with the four champions contesting an All-Ireland series.

Kildangan of Tipperary were the first champions after defeating Carrickshock of Kilkenny.

In 2007, London club Robert Emmetts became the first team from outside Ireland to win an All-Ireland title.

== Teams ==
=== Qualification ===
The championship features four teams in the All-Ireland series. County champions (or the relevant intermediate-grade champions, depending on county structures) contest the four provincial intermediate club championships, with the four provincial champions qualifying for the All-Ireland semi-finals.

Prior to 2018 the London champions entered at the quarter-final stage, but later competed through the provincial pathway.

Province	Championship	Qualifying team
Connacht	Connacht Intermediate Club Hurling Championship	Champions
Leinster	Leinster Intermediate Club Hurling Championship	Champions
Munster	Munster Intermediate Club Hurling Championship	Champions
Ulster	Ulster Intermediate Club Hurling Championship	Champions

== List of finals ==
Year	Winners			Runners-up			Venue	Winning captain	Ref.
Year	County	Club	Score	County	Club	Score	Venue	Winning captain	Ref.
2025–26	Tipperary	Upperchurch-Drombane	4–20	Mayo	Tooreen	2–24	Croke Park	Keith Ryan	
2024–25	Cork	Watergrasshill	2–15	Galway	Tynagh-Abbey/Duniry	0–18	Croke Park	Seán Desmond	
2023–24	Kilkenny	Thomastown	2–23	Cork	Castlelyons	0–13	Croke Park	Stephen Donnelly	
2022–23	Limerick	Monaleen	1–17	Mayo	Tooreen	1–15	Croke Park	Lorcan Lyons	
2021–22	Kildare	Naas	0–16	Kerry	Kilmoyley	1–11	Croke Park	Brian Byrne	
2020–21	No championship								
2019–20	Kilkenny	Tullaroan	3–19	Cork	Fr. O'Neill's	5–12	Croke Park	Shane Walsh	
2018–19	Galway	Oranmore-Maree	2–18	Cork	Charleville	1–15	Croke Park	Gearóid McInerney & Niall Burke	
2017–18	Cork	Kanturk	1–18	Kilkenny	St. Patrick's Ballyragget	1–17	Croke Park	Lorcan O'Neill	
2016–17	Kilkenny	Carrickshock	2–15	Galway	Ahascragh-Fohenagh	0–06	Croke Park	John Tennyson	
2015–16	Kilkenny	Bennettsbridge	1–17	Galway	Abbeyknockmoy	1–14	Croke Park	Enda Morrissey	
2014–15	Antrim	O'Donovan Rossa	1–09	London	Kilburn Gaels	2–03	Croke Park	Christopher McGuinness	
2013–14	Kilkenny	Rower-Inistioge	1–16	Galway	Kilnadeema-Leitrim	1–09	Croke Park	Michael Grace	
2012–13	Kilkenny	Clara	1–16	London	St. Gabriel's	0–13	Croke Park	David Langton	
2011–12	Carlow	Mount Leinster Rangers	1–13	Armagh	Middletown Na Fianna	1–11	Croke Park	Karol Lawlor	
2010–11	Cork	Ballymartle	3–15	Kilkenny	Dicksboro	1–20	Croke Park	Patrick Dwyer	
2009–10	Kilkenny	St. Lachtain's	3–17	Antrim	St. Gall's	0–10	Croke Park	Eoin Guinan	
2008–09	Cork	Blarney	2–14	Galway	Cappataggle	1–12	Croke Park	James Hughes	
2007–08	Westmeath	Clonkill	4–15	Galway	Tommy Larkin's	3–14	Croke Park	Paddy Dowdall	
2006–07	London	Robert Emmetts	1–14	Galway	Killimordaly	0–08	Croke Park	Fergus McMahon	
2005–06	Kilkenny	Dicksboro	2–13	Cork	Ballinhassig	1–13	Croke Park	David Carroll	
2004–05	Tipperary	Kildangan	2–13	Kilkenny	Carrickshock	1–13	Semple Stadium	Gerry Slattery	

== Roll of honour ==
=== Performances by county ===
County	Titles	Runners-up	Total finals
Kilkenny	8	3	11
Cork	4	4	8
Tipperary	2	0	2
Galway	1	7	8
London	1	2	3
Antrim	1	1	2
Carlow	1	0	1
Kildare	1	0	1
Westmeath	1	0	1
Limerick	1	0	1
Mayo	0	2	2
Armagh	0	1	1
Kerry	0	1	1

=== Performances by province ===
Province	Titles	Runners-up	Total finals
Leinster	11	3	14
Munster	7	5	12
Connacht	1	9	10
Britain	1	2	3
Ulster	1	1	2

== See also ==
- Munster Intermediate Club Hurling Championship
- Leinster Intermediate Club Hurling Championship
- Connacht Intermediate Club Hurling Championship
- Ulster Intermediate Club Hurling Championship
- All-Ireland Senior Club Hurling Championship
- All-Ireland Junior Club Hurling Championship
