= Leinster Intermediate Club Hurling Championship =

Hurling competition

Leinster GAA Hurling Intermediate Club Championship
- Current season or competition: 2026 Leinster Intermediate Club Hurling Championship
- Irish: Craobh Iomána Idirmheánach Laighean na gClub
- Code: Hurling
- Founded: 2004; 22 years ago
- Region: Leinster (GAA)
- Trophy: Tommy Murphy Cup
- No. of teams: 8
- Title holders: Danesfort (1st title)
- Most titles: Carrickshock; Dicksboro (2 titles)
- Sponsors: Allied Irish Banks
- Official website: Official website

The Leinster Intermediate Club Hurling Championship (known for sponsorship reasons as the AIB Leinster GAA Hurling Intermediate Club Championship; abbreviated as the Leinster Club IHC) is an annual hurling competition organised by the Leinster Council of the Gaelic Athletic Association and contested by the champion intermediate clubs and, in some cases, champion senior clubs in the province of Leinster in Ireland.

The Leinster Intermediate Club Championship was introduced in 2004. In its current format, the championship begins in late October or early November and is usually played over a four-week period. The eight participating club teams compete in a straight knockout competition that culminates with the Leinster final for the two remaining teams. The winner of the Leinster Intermediate Championship qualifies for the subsequent All-Ireland Club Championship.

The competition has been won by 18 club teams, while Carrickshock and Dicksboro are the only clubs to have won the title more than once. Kilkenny clubs have accumulated the highest number of victories with 13 wins.

Danesfort CLG are the title holders, defeating Ratoath GAA by 2-15 to 0-12 in the 2025 final.

== History ==
The 2006 Intermediate championship featured teams from Westmeath, Wexford, Kildare, Wicklow and Meath. Since 2007, all the counties mentioned except Kilkenny and Wexford are not represented in the Leinster Senior Club Hurling Championship and this gives these so-called weaker counties a chance to participate in a major competition. With Clonkill of Westmeath winning the Leinster Intermediate title and going on to capture the All-Ireland Intermediate Club Hurling Championship in 2007/08, the Westmeath champions have since participated in the Leinster Senior Championship, with noticeable results.

A fight broke out at the 2022 Leinster Intermediate Club Hurling Championship quarter-final match between Oulart–The Ballagh of Wexford and Naomh Barróg of Dublin at Parnell Park, first of all involving players and then spreading into the supporters in the stand. The Leinster GAA announced an investigation and An Garda Síochána gave a statement to RTÉ's This Week programme that it was aware of video footage of the incident had been uploaded to social media. Oulart–The Ballagh had been tipped to win the game but lost.

The Leinster Council proposed bans of up to a year for players and fines and/or proposed bans for spectators. The saga then continued when eight players appealed their bans.

The trophy awarded is named the Tommy Murphy Cup, named for the Danesfort man; Tommy Murphy (1949–2004) was a former chairman of Kilkenny County Board.

== Teams ==
=== Qualification ===
County	Championship	Qualifying team
Carlow	Carlow Intermediate Hurling Championship	Champions
Dublin	Dublin Intermediate Hurling Championship	Champions
Kilkenny	Kilkenny Intermediate Hurling Championship	Champions
Laois	Laois Premier Intermediate Hurling Championship	Champions
Meath	Meath Senior Hurling Championship	Champions
Offaly	Offaly Senior B Hurling Championship	Champions
Westmeath	Westmeath Senior B Hurling Championship	Champions
Wexford	Wexford Intermediate Hurling Championship	Champions
Wicklow	Wicklow Senior Hurling Championship	Champions

=== 2026 teams ===
78 clubs will compete in the 2024 Leinster Intermediate Club Hurling Championship:

County	No.	Clubs competing in county championship
Carlow	6	Bagenalstown Gaels, Burren Rangers, Carlow Town, Kildavin/Clonegal, Mount Leinster Rangers, Naomh Moling
Dublin	10	Ballyboden St Endas, Commercials, Good Counsel / Liffey Gaels, Kilmacud Crokes, Lucan Sarsfields, Naomh Ólaf, Round Towers, Scoil Uí Chonaill, St Marks, St Maurs
Kilkenny	12	Barrow Rangers, Blacks and Whites, Carrickscock, Dunnamaggin, James Stephens, Lisdowney, Mooncoin, Rower Inistioge, St. Lachtain's, St. Martin's, Tullogher Rosbercon, Young Irelands
Laois	8	Ballinakill, Ballyfin, Borris-in-Ossory–Kilcotton, Camross, Clonaslee–St Manman's, Clough–Ballacolla, Colt–Shanahoe, Rathdowney–Errill
Meath	12	Blackhall Gaels, Clann na nGael, Dunderry, Kildalkey, Killyon, Kilmessan, Kiltale, Longwood, Na Fianna, Ratoath, St Peters Dunboyne, Trim
Offaly	6	Carrig & Riverstown, Clara, Clodiagh Gaels, Drumcullen, Kilcormac/Killoughey, Seir Kieran
Westmeath	6	Castletown Geoghegan, Crookedwood, Cullion, Delvin, Fr. Dalton's, Ringtown
Wexford	12	Blackwater St. Brigid’s, Buffers Alley, Castletown-Liam Mellows, Cloughbawn, Craanford Fr. O'Regan's, Crossabeg/Ballymurn, Davidstown-Courtnacuddy, HWH-Bunclody, Horeswood, Kilrush-Askamore, St. James', Tara Rocks
Wicklow	8	Aughrim, Avondale, Bray Emmets, Carnew Emmets, Éire Óg Greystones, Glenealy, Kiltegan, St Patricks Wicklow Town

Note: Italic indicates second team therefore not allowed to compete in provincial championship.

== List of finals ==
=== List of Leinster IHC finals ===
Year	Winners			Runners-up		
Year	County	Club	Score	County	Club	Score
2025	KIL	Danesfort	2-15	MEA	Ratoath	0-12
2024	WEX	Rathnure St Anne's	0-24	KIL	Lisdowney	1-16
2023	KIL	Thomastown	2-22	WIC	Bray Emmets	1-09
2022	WIC	Bray Emmets	0-17	MEA	Trim	0-11
2021	KIL	Naas	3-12	WEX	Oylegate–Glenbrien	1-11
2020	No competition due to the impact of the COVID-19 pandemic on Gaelic games					
2019	KIL	Tullaroan	2-25	OFF	Seir Kieran	2-13
2018	KIL	Graigue-Ballycallan	2-17	LAO	Portlaoise	0-15
2017	KIL	St. Patrick's	0-19	WIC	Glenealy	1-15
2016	KIL	Carrickshock	3-12	KIL	Celbridge	1-16
2015	KIL	Bennettsbridge	1-14	MEA	Kiltale	0-13
2014	KIL	Mullinavat	1-13	MEA	Kiltale	0-13
2013	KIL	Rower-Inistioge	1-09	WEX	Buffers Alley	0-10
2012	KIL	Clara	3-20	WEX	Oylegate–Glenbrien	0-05
2011	CAR	Mount Leinster Rangers	1-13	KIL	Celbridge	0-13
2010	KIL	Dicksboro	5-09	KIL	Celbridge	0-08
2009	KIL	St. Lachtain's	1-08	CAR	Mount Leinster Rangers	0-07
2008	MEA	Kilmessan	1-07	KIL	Erin's Own	1-06
2007	WES	Clonkill	1-15	WEX	Ferns St Aidan's	3-07
2006	KIL	Ardclough	2-06	WES	Raharney	2-04
2005	KIL	Dicksboro	0-20	WEX	Marshalstown	0-03
2004	KIL	Carrickshock		WEX	St. Patrick's	

== Roll of honour ==
=== By club ===
#	Club	County	Titles	Runners-up	Championships won	Championships runner-up
1	Dicksboro	KIL	2	0	2005, 2010	—
1	Carrickshock	KIL	2	0	2004, 2016	—
3	Mount Leinster Rangers	CAR	1	1	2011	2009
3	Bray Emmets	WIC	1	1	2022	2023
3	Ardclough	KIL	1	0	2006	—
3	Clonkill	WES	1	0	2007	—
3	Kilmessan	MEA	1	0	2008	—
3	St. Lachtain's	KIL	1	0	2009	—
3	Clara	KIL	1	0	2012	—
3	Rower-Inistioge	KIL	1	0	2013	—
3	Mullinavat	KIL	1	0	2014	—
3	Bennettsbridge	KIL	1	0	2015	—
3	St. Patrick's	KIL	1	0	2017	—
3	Graigue-Ballycallan	KIL	1	0	2018	—
3	Tullaroan	KIL	1	0	2019	—
3	Naas	KIL	1	0	2021	—
3	Thomastown	KIL	1	0	2023	—
3	Danesfort	KIL	1	0	2025	—
18	Celbridge	KIL	0	3	—	2010, 2011, 2016
18	Kiltale	MEA	0	2	—	2014, 2015
18	Oylegate–Glenbrien	WEX	0	2	—	2012, 2021
18	St. Patrick's	WEX	0	1	—	2004
18	Marshalstown	WEX	0	1	—	2005
18	Raharney	WES	0	1	—	2006
18	Ferns St Aidan's	WEX	0	1	—	2007
18	Erin's Own	KIL	0	1	—	2008
18	Buffers Alley	WEX	0	1	—	2013
18	Glenealy	WIC	0	1	—	2017
18	Portlaoise	LAO	0	1	—	2018
18	Seir Kieran	OFF	0	1	—	2019
18	Trim	MEA	0	1	—	2022

=== By county ===
County	Titles	Runners-up	Total
Kilkenny	13	2	15
Kildare	2	3	5
Wexford	1	6	7
Meath	1	4	5
Wicklow	1	2	3
Carlow	1	1	2
Westmeath	1	1	2
Laois	0	1	1
Offaly	0	1	1

== Records and statistics ==
=== Top scorers ===
==== By year ====
Year	Top scorer	Team	Score	Total
2015	Jack Regan	Kiltale	0-20	20
2015	Jack Regan	Kiltale	0-20	20
2016	Gerry Keegan	Celbridge	1-29	32
2017	Kevin Kelly	St Patrick's Ballyragget	0-34	34
2018	Conor Murphy	Graigue–Ballycallan	0-31	31
2019	Shane Walsh	Tullaroan	2-27	33
2021	Séamus Casey	Oylegate–Glenbrien	5-15	30
2022	Christy Moorehouse	Bray Emmets	0-44	44
2023	Robbie Donnelly	Thomastown	1-31	34
2024	Jack Redmond	Rathnure St Anne's	1-26	29
2025	Pádraig O'Hanrahan	Ratoath	0-33	33

== See also ==
- Leinster Senior Club Hurling Championship (Tier 1)
- Leinster Junior Club Hurling Championship (Tier 3)
- Leinster Junior B Club Hurling Championship (Tier 4)
- All-Ireland Intermediate Club Hurling Championship
  - Connacht Intermediate Club Hurling Championship
  - Munster Intermediate Club Hurling Championship
  - Ulster Intermediate Club Hurling Championship
