= 2023 Down Senior Hurling Championship =

Annual hurling competition season

- Dates: 6 August - October 2023
- Teams: 6
- Sponsor: Morgan Fuels
- Champions: Portaferry (23rd title); Matt Conlan (captain)
- Runners-up: Ballycran; Stephen Keith (captain); Liam Savage (captain); Michael Ennis (manager)

Tournament statistics
- Matches played: 18
- Goals scored: 53 (2.94 per match)
- Points scored: 586 (32.56 per match)

The 2023 Down Senior Hurling Championship was the 115th staging of the Down Senior Hurling Championship since its establishment by the Down County Board in 1903. The draw for the opening round fixtures took place on 28 June 2023. The championship ran from 6 August to October 2023.

Portaferry entered the championship as the defending champions.

The final was played on 22 October 2023 at Páirc Esler in Newry, between Portaferry and Ballycran, in what was their sixth consecutive meeting in the final. Portaferry won the match by 0–20 to 0–16 to claim their 23rd championship title overall and a second title in succession.

== Team changes ==
=== To Championship ===
Promoted from the Down Intermediate Hurling Championship

- Liatroim Fontenoys

== Group stage ==
=== Group stage table ===
Knockout stage

Team	Matches				Score			Pts
Team	Pld	W	D	L	For	Against	Diff	Pts
Ballycran	5	5	0	0	141	77	64	10
Portaferry	5	4	0	1	132	70	62	8
Ballygalget	5	3	0	2	111	98	13	6
Liatroim Fontenoys	5	2	0	3	106	93	13	4
Bredagh	5	1	0	4	70	143	-73	2
Newry Shamrocks	5	0	0	5	61	140	-79	0

=== Group stage results ===
6 August 2023 Round 1	Ballygalget	1-11 - 1-24	Ballycran	Mitchell Park

6 August 2023 Round 1	Liatroim Fontenoys	2-25 - 0-08	Bredagh	Fontenoy Park

7 August 2023 Round 1	Portaferry	2-26 - 0-08	Newry Shamrocks	St Patrick's Park

13 August 2023 Round 2	Ballycran	3-13 - 1-16	Portaferry	McKenna Park

14 August 2023 Round 2	Bredagh	0-18 - 0-21	Ballygalget	Cherryvale Playing Fields

14 August 2023 Round 2	Newry Shamrocks	1-08 - 0-25	Liatroim Fontenoys	Páirc Esler

20 August 2023 Round 3	Portaferry	2-15 - 0-14	Liatroim Fontenoys	St Patrick's Park

20 August 2023 Round 3	Newry Shamrocks	2-08 - 7-16	Ballygalget	Páirc Esler

20 August 2023 Round 3	Ballycran	6-19 - 0-13	Bredagh	McKenna Park

10 September 2023 Round 4	Bredagh	1-18 - 0-16	Newry Shamrocks	Cherryvale Playing Fields

10 September 2023 Round 4	Liatroim Fontenoys	2-13 - 3-21	Ballycran	Fontenoy Park

10 September 2023 Round 4	Ballygalget	0-16 - 0-22	Portaferry	Mitchell Park

23 September 2023 Round 5	Ballygalget	2-17 - 2-11	Liatroim Fontenoys	Kilclief Grounds

24 September 2023 Round 5	Newry Shamrocks	1-09 - 1-22	Ballycran	Ballela Grounds

24 September 2023 Round 5	Portaferry	4-26 - 1-07	Bredagh	Carryduff Grounds

== Knockout stage ==
=== Semi-finals ===
8 October 2023 Semi-final	Portaferry	2-18 - 2-09	Ballygalget	St Patrick's Park
		Report

8 October 2023 Semi-final	Ballycran	2-20 - 2-17	Liatroim Fontenoys	McKenna Park
		Report

=== Final ===
22 October 2023 Final	Portaferry	0-20 - 0-16	Ballycran	Páirc Esler
	E Sands (0-04, 1 free), T McGrattan (0-04), D Sands (0-04), M Conlan (0-02), P Conlan (0-02, frees), F Turpin (0-02), T Murray and B Trainor (0-01 each)	Report	P Sheehan (0-04, 2 free, 1 ’65), S Martin (0-04), C Woods (0-3, 1 free), P Savage (0-02); M Hughes, S Nicholsan, C Egan (0-01 each)	Referee: P Owens (Liatroim)
