= Down Intermediate Hurling Championship =

Annual hurling competition for Intermediate clubs in Down

- Irish: Craobhchomórtas Idirmhéanach Iomána an Dún
- Code: Hurling
- Region: Down (GAA)
- Trophy: Charlie Keown Memorial Cup
- No. of teams: 8
- Title holders: Newry Shamrocks (5th title)
- Sponsors: Morgan Fuels
- Official website: Down GAA

The Down Intermediate Hurling Championship (known for sponsorship reasons as the Down GAA Northern Switchgear Intermediate Hurling Championship and abbreviated to the Down IHC) is an annual hurling competition organised by the Down County Board of the Gaelic Athletic Association for the second tier hurling teams in County Down in Northern Ireland.

In its current format, the Down Intermediate Championship begins with a group stage. The eight group stage teams play in two groups against each other in a round-robin system. The two first placed teams face each other in the final. The final is usually played at Páirc Esler in Newry. The winner of the Down Intermediate Hurling Championship qualifies for the subsequent Ulster Intermediate Club Championship.

Newry Shamrocks are the title holders after defeating Clonduff by 2-14 to 1-12 in the 2026 final.

== Format ==
=== Group stage ===
The eight teams are divided in two groups. Teams face each other team in the group. Two points are awarded for a win, one for a draw and zero for a loss. The teams are ranked in the group stage table by points gained, then scoring difference and then their head-to-head record. The first placed teams from both groups face each other in the final.

=== Knockout stage ===
Final: The two first placed teams in the final contest the final.

== Teams ==
=== 2026 teams ===
The following teams were competed in the 2026 Down Intermediate Hurling Championship:

Club	Location	Colours	Championship titles	Last championship title
Intermediate clubs
Ballela	Ballela	Green and Gold	0	—
Ballyvarley	Banbridge	Red and White	0	—
Castlewellan	Castlewellan	Green and White	0	—
Clonduff	Hilltown	Yellow and white	0	—
East Belfast	Belfast	Black and Gold	0	—
Kilclief	Kilclief	Green and Red	3	2011
St. Peter's	Warrenpoint	Blue and white	0	
Newry Shamrocks	Newry	Green and White	5	2026
Senior clubs
Ballycran	Rubane	Black and amber	7	2007
Ballygalget	Ards Peninsula	Green and white	9	2005
Bredagh	Ballynafeigh	Maroon and white	7	2024
Carryduff	Carryduff	Purple and Gold	2	2020
Liatroim Fontenoys	Leitrim	Green, white and yellow	12	2025
Portaferry	Portaferry	Blue and yellow	4	2004

== Qualification for subsequent competitions ==
The Down Intermediate Championship winners qualify for the subsequent Ulster Intermediate Club Hurling Championship.

== Trophy and medals ==
The Charlie Keown Memorial Cup is the current prize for winning the championship. It was commissioned to honour Liatroim Fontenoys clubman Charlie Keown who served in a number of administrative roles with the Down County Board, including a three-year term as chairman from 1985. Pearse Óg McCrickard was the first recipient of the cup in 2022.

== List of finals ==
Up to 2025 the bottom two teams of the Down SHC qualified for the IHC semi-finals.

Up until the early 2010s the traditional Ards sides in Portaferry, Ballygalget & Ballycran would have entered their seconds team in the championship.

Year	Winners		Runners-up		Venue	#
Year	Club	Score	Club	Score	Venue	#
2026	Newry Shamrocks	2-14	Clonduff	1-12	Páirc Esler	
2025	Liatroim Fontenoys	0-17	Carryduff	2-09	Páirc Esler	
2024	Bredagh	4-17	Carryduff	1-16	Páirc Esler	
2023	Bredagh	2-16	Carryduff	0-09	Páirc Esler	
2022	Liatroim Fontenoys	0-24	Carryduff	2-15	Páirc Esler	
2021	Newry Shamrocks	2-12	Carryduff	1-13	Páirc Esler	
2020	Carryduff	2-15	Liatroim Fontenoys	1-12	Páirc Esler	
2019	Bredagh	2-13* 1-16	Carryduff	1-08* 2-13		*Replay
2018	Liatroim Fontenoys	2-19	Bredagh	2-13		
2017	Liatroim Fontenoys					
2016	Bredagh	2-17	Ballycran	2-16		
2015	Portaferry	1-14	Carryduff	1-09		
2014	Bredagh	1-15	Ballycran	1-14		
2013	Bredagh					
2012	No Championship due to restructure					
2011	Kilclief		Liatroim Fontenoys			
2010	Bredagh					
2009	Liatroim Fontenoys					
2008	Liatroim Fontenoys					
2007	Ballycran					
2006	Liatroim Fontenoys		Ballycran			
2005	Ballygalget					
2004	Portaferry					
2003	Portaferry					
2002	Ballygalget					
2001	Liatroim Fontenoys					
2000	Kilclief					
1999	Ballygalget					
1998	Liatroim Fontenoys					
1997	Ballygalget					
1996	Ballycran					
1995	Liatroim Fontenoys					
1994	Ballygalget					
1993	Liatroim Fontenoys					
1992	Darragh Cross					
1991	Portaferry					
1990	Ballycran					
1989	Portaferry					
1988	Liatroim Fontenoys					
1987	Ballycran					
1986	Newry Shamrocks					
1985	Ballycran					
1984	An Riocht					
1983	Ballygalget					
1982	Newry Shamrocks					
1981	An Riocht					
1980	Ballycran					
1979	Ballygalget					
1978	Newry Shamrocks					
1977	Ballygalget					
1976	Ballycran					
1975	Kilclief					
1974	Ballygalget					

== Roll of honour ==
#	Club	Titles	Runners-up	Years won	Years runners-up
1	Liatroim Fontenoys	12	2	1988, 1993, 1995, 1998, 2001, 2006, 2008, 2009, 2017, 2018, 2022, 2025	2011, 2020
2	Ballygalget	9	0	1974, 1977, 1979, 1983, 1994, 1997, 1999, 2002, 2005	—
3	Ballycran	7	2	1976, 1980, 1985, 1987, 1990, 1996, 2007	2014, 2016
3	Bredagh	7	1	2010, 2013, 2014, 2016, 2019, 2023, 2024	2018
5	Newry Shamrocks	5	0	1978, 1982, 1986, 2021, 2026	—
5	Portaferry	5	0	1989, 1991, 2003, 2004, 2015	—
7	Kilclief	3	0	1975, 2000, 2011	—
8	An Riocht	2	0	1981, 1984	—
9	Carryduff	1	7	2020	2015, 2019, 2021, 2022, 2023, 2024, 2025
9	Darragh Cross	1	0	1992	—
11	Clonduff	0	2	—	2003, 2026

== See also ==
- Down Senior Hurling Championship (Tier 1)
