= 2025 Down Senior Hurling Championship =

Annual hurling competition season

- Dates: 9 August - 26 October 2025
- Teams: 6
- Sponsor: Morgan Fuels
- Champions: Portaferry (25th title); Matthew Conlan (captain); Gerard McGrattan (manager)
- Runners-up: Ballygalget; John McManus (captain)

Tournament statistics
- Matches played: 18
- Goals scored: 59 (3.28 per match)
- Points scored: 615 (34.17 per match)

The 2025 Down Senior Hurling Championship was the 117th staging of the Down Senior Hurling Championship since its establishment by the Down County Board in 1903. The championship is scheduled to run from 9 August to 26 October 2025.

Portaferry entered the championship as the defending champions.

The final was played on 26 October 2025 at Páirc Esler in Newry, between Portaferry and Ballygalget, in what was their second consecutive meeting in the final. Portaferry won the match by 2–24 to 2–13 to claim their 25th championship title overall and a fourrth consecutive title.

== Group stage ==
=== Group stage table ===
Knockout stage

Team	Matches				Score			Pts
Team	Pld	W	D	L	For	Against	Diff	Pts
Portaferry	5	5	0	0	160	74	86	10
Ballygalget	5	4	0	1	123	75	48	8
Ballycran	5	2	1	2	84	119	-35	5
Bredagh	5	2	0	3	102	104	-2	4
Liatroim	5	1	0	4	95	143	-48	2
Carryduff	5	0	1	4	86	135	-49	1

== Knockout stage ==
=== Semi-finals ===
12 October 2025 Semi-final	Portaferry	1-31 - 1-10	Bredagh	St Patrick's Park

12 October 2025 Semi-final	Ballygalget	3-18 - 2-13	Ballycran	Mitchel Park

=== Final ===
26 October 2025 Final	Portaferry	2-24 - 2-13	Ballygalget	Páirc Esler
	C Coleman (1-8, pen,4f), E Sands (1-0), N Fitzsimmons (0-5), F Turpin (0-4), D Sands (0-2), B Trainor (0-1), S Conlon (0-1), N Milligan (0-1), C Fay (0-1), N Rogers (0-1).	Report	E Pucci (2-6,4f), M Fisher (0-4, 3f), M Og Dorian (0-2), O Coulter (0-1)	Referee: T Masterson
