= 2026 Down Senior Hurling Championship =

Annual hurling competition season

- Dates: 12 August - 18 October 2026
- Teams: 6
- Sponsor: Morgan Fuels
- Champions: Portaferry
- Runners-up: Ballygalget

Tournament statistics
- Matches played: 18

The 2026 Down Senior Hurling Championship is the 118th staging of the Down Senior Hurling Championship since its establishment by the Down County Board in 1903. The championship is scheduled to run from 12 August to 18 October 2026.

Portaferry enters the championship as the defending champions.

Portaferry defended their title by beating Ballygalget 2-28 - 2-17 in the final to claim their 26th title and their 5th in a row.

== Group stage ==
=== Group stage table ===
Knockout stage

Team	Matches				Score			Pts
Team	Pld	W	D	L	For	Against	Diff	Pts
Portaferry	5	5	0	0	181	60	121	10
Ballygalget	5	4	0	1	125	92	33	8
Ballycran	5	3	0	2	102	106	-4	6
Liatroim	5	2	0	3	89	140	-51	4
Bredagh	5	1	0	4	91	117	-26	2
Carryduff	5	0	0	5	83	156	-73	0

=== Group games ===
Source: Down GAA Home Page

12 August 2026 Round 1	Portaferry	4-30 - 0-11	Carryduff	Portaferry
		Report

12 August 2026 Round 1	Bredagh	0-15 - 1-14	Ballygalget	Cherryvale
		Report

12 August 2026 Round 1	Liatroim	1-16 - 2-19	Ballycran	Liatroim
		Report

19 August 2026 Round 2	Carryduff	3-13 - 2-18	Bredagh	Carryduff
		Report

19 August 2026 Round 2	Ballycran	2-12 - 1-25	Portaferry	Ballycran
		Report

19 August 2026 Round 2	Ballygalget	3-19 - 0-18	Liatroim	Ballygalget
		Report

6 September 2026 Round 3	Ballycran	1-21 - 2-13	Carryduff	Ballycran

6 September 2026 Round 3	Portaferry	1-26 - 1-11	Ballygalget	Portaferry

9 September 2026 Round 3	Liatroim	5-12 - 3-11	Bredagh	Liatroim

20 September 2026 Round 4	Carryduff	1-14 - 0-22	Liatroim	Carryduff

20 September 2026 Round 4	Bredagh	0-14 - 0-32	Portaferry	Cherryvale

20 September 2026 Round 4	Ballygalget	1-19 - 1-13	Ballycran	Ballygalget

27 September 2026 Round 5	Portaferry	4-38 - 0-03	Liatroim

27 September 2026 Round 5	Carryduff	1-11 - 4-32	Ballygalget

27 September 2026 Round 5	Bredagh	1-15 - 1-16	Ballycran

== Knockout stage ==
=== Semi-finals ===
4 October 2026 Semi-final	Portaferry	3-29 - 1-07	Liatroim	St Patricks Park
		Report

4 October 2026 Semi-final	Ballygalget	2-19 - 2-12	Ballycran	Ballygalget
		Report

=== Final ===
18 October 2026 Final	Portaferry	2-28 - 2-17	Ballygalget	Páirc Esler
	T McGrattan 0-13 (9f, 1'65), C Milligan 1-1, E Sands 1-2, F Turpin 0-4 D Sands 0-4, N Fitsimmons 0-2, C Coleman 0-1, R Blair 0-1.	Report	Cathal Coulter 1-6 (4f), E Pucci 0-5 (4f), T Prenter 0-3, S Pucci 1-0, Owen McDermott 0-1, M Fisher 0-1 (1f), M Og Dorrian 0-1.	Referee: C Masterson
