= 2018 Down Senior Hurling Championship =

Annual hurling competition season

- Champions: Ballycran (25th title); Michael Hughes (captain); Gary Savage (manager)
- Runners-up: Portaferry

The 2018 Down Senior Hurling Championship was the 110th staging of the Down Senior Hurling Championship since its establishment by the Down County Board in 1903.

Ballygalget entered the championship as the defending champions.

The final was played on 30 September 2018 at Mitchel Park, between Ballycran and Portaferry, in what was their first meeting in the final in four years. Ballycran won the match by 2–13 to 1–14 to claim their 25th championship title overall and a first title in three years.

== Results ==
=== Final ===
| 30 September 2018 Final | Ballycran | 2-13 - 1-14 | Portaferry | McKenna Park |
| | C Woods 2-3 (1-0f), C McManus 0-4 (4f); S Nicholson 0-2 (1f); L Savage; P Savage; J Coyle; G Hughes 0-1 each | Report | R Blair 1-8 (8f); E Sands; C O'Prey (0-1 65'); M Conlan; T Murray; N Fitzsimmons; C Mageean 0-1 each |
