= 2024 Down Senior Hurling Championship =

Annual hurling competition season

- Dates: 4 August - 20 October 2024
- Teams: 6
- Sponsor: Morgan Fuels
- Champions: Portaferry (24th title); Matt Conlan (captain); Gerard McGrattan (manager)
- Runners-up: Ballygalget

Tournament statistics
- Matches played: 18
- Goals scored: 63 (3.5 per match)
- Points scored: 680 (37.78 per match)

The 2024 Down Senior Hurling Championship was the 116th staging of the Down Senior Hurling Championship since its establishment by the Down County Board in 1903. The draw for the opening round fixtures took place on 3 June 2024. The championship ran from 4 August to 20 October 2024.

Portaferry were the defending champions.

The final was played on 20 October 2024 at Páirc Esler in Newry, between Portaferry and Ballygalget. Portaferry won the match by 3–21 to 2–14 to claim their 24th championship title overall and a third title in succession.

== Team changes ==
=== To Championship ===
Promoted from the Down Intermediate Hurling Championship

- Carryduff

=== From Championship ===
Relegated to the Down Intermediate Hurling Championship

- Newry Shamrocks

== Group stage ==
=== Group stage table ===
Knockout stage

| Team | Matches | | | | Score | | | Pts |
| Team | Pld | W | D | L | For | Against | Diff | Pts |
|---|---|---|---|---|---|---|---|---|
| Ballygalget | 5 | 5 | 0 | 0 | 147 | 91 | 56 | 10 |
| Portaferry | 5 | 4 | 0 | 1 | 160 | 79 | 81 | 8 |
| Ballycran | 5 | 3 | 0 | 2 | 133 | 101 | 32 | 6 |
| Liatroim Fontenoys | 5 | 1 | 0 | 4 | 128 | 159 | -31 | 2 |
| Carryduff | 5 | 1 | 0 | 4 | 79 | 131 | -52 | 2 |
| Bredagh | 5 | 1 | 0 | 4 | 78 | 164 | -86 | 2 |

=== Group stage results ===
| 4 August 2024 Round 1 | Ballygalget | 1-23 - 1-17 | Ballycran | Mitchel Park |
| | | Report |

| 12 August 2024 Round 1 | Portaferry | 4-30 - 0-14 | Bredagh | St Patrick's Park |

| 12 August 2024 Round 1 | Carryduff | 1-15 - 2-25 | Liatroim Fontenoys | Carryduff Grounds |

| 17 August 2024 Round 2 | Liatroim Fontenoys | 2-21 - 5-21 | Ballygalget | Fontenoy Park |

| 18 August 2024 Round 2 | Bredagh | 0-15 - 2-15 | Carryduff | Cherryvale Grounds |

| 18 August 2024 Round 2 | Ballycran | 0-13 - 2-22 | Portaferry | McKenna Park |

| 31 August 2024 Round 3 | Ballygalget | 1-15 - 1-12 | Carryduff | Mitchel Park |

| 1 September 2024 Round 3 | Ballycran | 2-22 - 0-10 | Bredagh | McKenna Park |

| 1 September 2024 Round 3 | Liatroim Fontenoys | 0-18 - 3-24 | Portaferry | Fontenoy Park |

| 7 September 2024 Round 4 | Bredagh | 3-21 - 3-20 | Liatroim Fontenoys | Cherryvale Grounds |

| 8 September 2024 Round 4 | Carryduff | 1-11 - 2-24 | Ballycran | Carryduff Grounds |

| 8 September 2024 Round 4 | Portaferry | 1-17 - 0-23 | Ballygalget | St Patrick's Park |

| 21 September 2024 Round 5 | Liatroim Fontenoys | 0-23 - 6-24h | Ballycran | Carryduff Grounds |

| 22 September 2024 Round 5 | Ballygalget | 5-29 - 0-09 | Bredagh | Teconnaught Grounds |

| 22 September 2024 Round 5 | Carryduff | 0-11 - 4-25 | Portaferry | Páirc Tomás Ruséil |

== Knockout stage ==
=== Semi-finals ===
| 6 October 2024 Semi-final | Ballygalget | 2-15 - 0-16 | Liatroim Fontenoys | Mitchel Park |

| 6 October 2024 Semi-final | Portaferry | 1-31 - 3-14 | Ballycran | St Patrick's Park |

=== Final ===
| 20 October 2024 Final | Ballygalget | 2-15 - 3-21 | Portaferry | Páirc Esler |
| | T Prenter (0-1), M Fisher (1-4,4f), S Pucci (0-2), O McDermott (0-2), O Coulter (1-1), B Teggart (0-1), E Pucci (0-1), D Toner (0-1), Cathal Coulter (0-1, f) | Report | D Sands (1-5), E Sands (1-1), T McGrattan (1-12,8f), F Turpin (0-1), B Trainor (0-1), N Fitzsimmons (0-1) |
