= 1998 Down Senior Hurling Championship =

Annual hurling competition season

- Champions: Ballygalget (12th title)
- Runners-up: Portaferry

The 1998 Down Senior Hurling Championship was the 90th staging of the Down Senior Hurling Championship since its establishment by the Down County Board in 1903.

Ballygalget entered the championship as the defending champions.

The final was played on 30 August 1998 at McKenna Park, between Ballygalget and Portaferry, in what was their third consecutive meeting in the final. Ballygalget won the match by 0–16 to 1–10 to claim their 12th championship title overall and a second consecutive title.

== Results ==
=== Final ===
30 August 1999 Final	Ballygalget	0-16 - 1-10	Portaferry	McKenna Park
	J McGrattan 0-10.
