= 2022 Down Senior Hurling Championship =

Annual hurling competition season

- Teams: 6
- Sponsor: Morgan Fuels
- Champions: Portaferry (22nd title); Conor Mageean (captain); Karol Keating (manager)
- Runners-up: Ballycran

The 2022 Down Senior Hurling Championship was the 114th staging of the Down Senior Hurling Championship since its establishment by the Down County Board in 1903.

Ballycran entered the championship as the defending champions.

The final was played on 9 October 2023 at Páirc Esler in Newry, between Portaferry and Ballycran, in what was their fifth consecutive meeting in the final. Portaferry won the match by 1-12 to 0-13 to claim their 22nd championship title overall and a first title in two years.

== Knockout stage ==
=== Semi-finals ===
25 September 2022 Semi-final	Portaferry	3-13 - 0-09	Ballygalget	St Patrick's Park
		Report

25 September 2023 Semi-final	Ballycran	1-24 - 0-17	Bredagh	McKenna Park
		Report

=== Final ===
9 October 2022 Final	Ballycran	1-12 - 0-13	Portaferry	Páirc Esler
	R Blair (1-9, 1-0 penalty, 0-6 frees), C Mageean (0-1), T McGrattan (0-1), D Sands (0-1).		S Nicholson (0-6, 0-5 frees), N Breen (0-2), L Savage (0-2); M Hughes (0-1), C Woods (0-1), C Egan (0-1).	Referee: P Owens (Liatroim)
