= Gabriel Clarke (hurler) =

Irish sportsperson

Personal information
- Born: Ballygalget, County Down

Sport
- Sport: Hurling
- Position: Half-back
Club
- Years: Club
- 1990s-present: Ballygalget
Club titles
- Ulster titles: 1
Inter-county
- Years: County
- 2000-present: Down
Inter-county titles
- Ulster titles: 1 (under 21)
- All-Irelands: 0
- NHL: 1 (dvi 2)
- All Stars: 0

Gabriel Clarke (born 1981 in Ballygalget, County Down) is an Irish sportsperson. He plays hurling with his local club Ballygalget and has been a member of the Down senior inter-county team since 2000.

== Playing career ==
=== Club ===
Clarke plays his hurling with his local club in Ballygalget and has enjoyed much success. He first came to prominence in the late 1990s when the club captured three county senior championship titles in-a-row between 1997 and 1999. After a period out of the limelight Ballygalget returned in 2003 with Clarke collecting another county winners' medal. It was the first of another three-in-a-row for Ballygalget and for Clarke. The third of these victories was subsequently converted into an Ulster club title following a defeat of Cushendall.

In 2008 Clarke won his latest county senior championship winners’ medal following an eleven-point trouncing of Portaferry.

=== Inter-county ===
Clarke first came to prominence on the inter-county scene as a member of the Down minor hurling team in the late 1990s. He enjoyed little success in this grade and made his senior championship debut as a nineteen-year-old in 2000. After some success in the 1990s the new century proved to be an unhappy time for Down's hurling team as Antrim and Derry reclaimed their status as the standard-bearers in the provincial championship. Clarke lined out in further Ulster finals in 2001, 2002, 2004, 2005, 2007 and 2008, however, he ended up on the losing side on all six occasions.

In 2005 a restructuring of the championship saw Down being entered in the Christy Ring Cup, effectively a competition for the ‘second-tier’ hurling teams. Clarke's side did well in their debut year and even reached the final of the competition. Westmeath provided the opposition on that occasion, however, at the full-time whistle Down were defeated by 1–23 to 2–18. The team, however, have failed to build on this in recent years.

=== Inter-provincial ===
Clarke has also lined out with Ulster in the inter-provincial hurling competition. He has enjoyed little success with his province as Ulster have failed to even qualify for the Railway Cup final in recent years.
