= 2013 Down Senior Hurling Championship =

Annual hurling competition season

- Champions: Ballygalget (19th title)
- Runners-up: Portaferry

The 2013 Down Senior Hurling Championship was the 105th staging of the Down Senior Hurling Championship since its establishment by the Down County Board in 1903.

Portaferry entered the championship as the defending champions.

The final was played on 29 September 2013 at McKenna Park, between Ballygalget and Portaferry, in what was their first meeting in the final in five years. Ballygalget won the match by 1–18 to 1–11 to claim their 19th championship title overall and a first title in three years.

== Results ==
=== Final ===
29 September 2013 Final	Ballygalget	1-18 - 1-11	Portaferry	McKenna Park
