= 1988 Down Senior Hurling Championship =

Annual hurling competition season

- Champions: Portaferry (11th title)
- Runners-up: Ballycran

The 1988 Down Senior Hurling Championship was the 80th staging of the Down Senior Hurling Championship since its establishment by the Down County Board in 1903.

Ballycran entered the championship as the defending champions.

The final, a replay, was played on 24 September 1988 at Mitchel Park, between Portaferry and Ballycran, in what was their first meeting in the final in two years. Portaferry won the match to claim their 11th championship title overall and a first title in six years.
