= 2016 Down Senior Hurling Championship =

Annual hurling competition season

- Champions: Ballygalget (20th title)
- Runners-up: Ballycran

The 2016 Down Senior Hurling Championship was the 108th staging of the Down Senior Hurling Championship since its establishment by the Down County Board in 1903.

Ballycran entered the championship as the defending champions.

The final was played on 24 September 2016 at St Patrick's Park, between Ballygalget and Ballycran, in what was their second consecutive meeting in the final. Ballygalget won the match by 0–06 to 0–02 to claim their 20th championship title overall and a first title in three years.

== Results ==
=== Final ===
| 24 September 2016 Final | Ballygalget | 0-06 - 0-02 | Ballycran | St Patrick's Park |
| | D McManus 0-2, C Coulter 0-2 (2f), G Johnston 0-2 (1 '65'). | Report | S Nicholson 0-2 (2f) . |
