= 1997 Down Senior Hurling Championship =

Annual hurling competition season

- Champions: Ballygalget (11th title)
- Runners-up: Portaferry

The 1997 Down Senior Hurling Championship was the 89th staging of the Down Senior Hurling Championship since its establishment by the Down County Board in 1903.

Portaferry entered the championship as the defending champions.

The final was played on 7 September 1997 at McKenna Park, between Ballygalget and Portaferry, in what was their second consecutive meeting in the final. Ballygalget won the match by 2–11 to 0–09 to claim their 11th championship title overall and a first title in five years.

== Results ==
=== Final ===
7 September 1997 Final	Ballygalget	2-11 - 0-09	Portaferry	McKenna Park
