= 2017 Down Senior Hurling Championship =

Annual hurling competition season

- Champions: Ballygalget (21st title)
- Runners-up: Portaferry

The 2017 Down Senior Hurling Championship was the 109th staging of the Down Senior Hurling Championship since its establishment by the Down County Board in 1903.

Ballygalget entered the championship as the defending champions.

The final was played on 24 September 2017 at McKenna Park, between Ballygalget and Portaferry, in what was their first meeting in the final in nine years. Ballygalget won the match by 2–13 to 2–12 to claim their 21st championship title overall and a second consecutive title. It remains Ballygalget's last championship title win.

== Results ==
=== Final ===
24 September 2017 Final	Ballygalget	2-13 - 2-12	Portaferry	McKenna Park
	C Coulter 2-3, G Johnston 0-6 (4f), G Roddy 0-2, E Clarke 0-1, C Bailie 0-1.	Report	D Sands 2-3; P Braniff 0-6 (4f), K McGarry 0-1, A O'Prey 0-1, K Keating 0-1 '65.
