= 2015 Down Senior Hurling Championship =

Annual hurling competition season

- Champions: Ballycran (27th title); Michael Ennis (captain)
- Runners-up: Ballygalget

The 2015 Down Senior Hurling Championship was the 107th staging of the Down Senior Hurling Championship since its establishment by the Down County Board in 1903.

Portaferry entered the championship as the defending champions.

The final was played on 27 September 2015 at St Patrick's Park in Portaferry, between Ballycrian and Ballygalget, in what was their first meeting in the final in five years. Ballycran won the match by 1–15 to 0–16 to claim their 24th championship title overall and a first title in four years.

== Results ==
=== Final ===
27 September 2015 Final	Ballycran	1-15 - 0-16	Ballygalget	St Patrick's Park
	S Nicholson 0-7 (4f), B Ennis 1-0, J Coyle, E Gilmore 0-2 each; C Woods ('65'), M Hughes, B Nicholson, S Dineen 0-1 each.	Report	D Toner 0-6, C Doran 0-4, G Johnson 0-3, D McManus 0-2, J McManus 0-1.
