= 2003 Down Senior Hurling Championship =

Annual hurling competition season

- Champions: Ballygalget (14th title)
- Runners-up: Portaferry

The 2003 Down Senior Hurling Championship was the 95th staging of the Down Senior Hurling Championship since its establishment by the Down County Board in 1903.

Portaferry entered the championship as the defending champions.

The final was played on 12 October 2003 at McKenna Park, between Ballygalget and Portaferry, in what was their second consecutive meeting in the final. Ballygalget won the match by 0–17 to 1–10 to claim their 14th championship title overall and a first title in four years.

== Results ==
=== Final ===
12 October 2003 Final	Ballygalget	0-17 - 1-10	Portaferry	McKenna Park
