= 2007 Down Senior Hurling Championship =

Annual hurling competition season

- Champions: Ballycran (21st title)
- Runners-up: Ballygalget

The 2007 Down Senior Hurling Championship was the 99th staging of the Down Senior Hurling Championship since its establishment by the Down County Board in 1903.

Portaferry entered the championship as the defending champions.

The final was played on 23 September 2007 at St Patrick's Park, between Ballycran and Ballygalget, in what was their first meeting in the final in two years. Ballycran won the match by 1–13 to 0–09 to claim their 21st championship title overall and a first title in 12 years.

== Results ==
=== Final ===
23 September 2007 Final	Ballycran	1-13 - 0-09	Ballygalget	Mitchel Park
		Report
