= 1993 Down Senior Hurling Championship =

Annual hurling competition season

- Champions: Ballycran (18th title)
- Runners-up: Ballygalget

The 1993 Down Senior Hurling Championship was the 85th staging of the Down Senior Hurling Championship since its establishment by the Down County Board in 1903.

Ballygalget entered the championship as the defending champions.

The final, a replay, was played on 12 September 1993 at St Patrick's Park, between Ballycran and Ballygalget, in what was their second consecutive meeting in the final. Ballycran won the match by 2–17 to 2–15 to claim their 18th championship title overall and a first title in five years.

== Results ==
=== Final ===
29 August 1993 Final	Ballycran	1-09 - 1-09	Ballygalget	St Patrick's Park

=== Final replay ===
12 September 1993 Final replay	Ballycran	2-17 - 2-15 (aet)	Ballygalget	St Patrick's Park
