= 2012 Down Senior Hurling Championship =

Annual hurling competition season

- Champions: Portaferry (19th title)
- Runners-up: Ballycran

The 2012 Down Senior Hurling Championship was the 104th staging of the Down Senior Hurling Championship since its establishment by the Down County Board in 1903.

Ballycran entered the championship as the defending champions.

The final was played on 30 September 2012 at Mitchel Park, between Portaferry and Ballycran, in what was their second consecutive meeting in the final. Portaferry won the match by 3–08 to 0–11 to claim their 19th championship title overall and a first title in six years.

== Results ==
=== Final ===
30 September 2012 Final	Portaferry	3-08 - 0-12	Ballycran	Mitchel Park
		Report
