= 1992 Down Senior Hurling Championship =

Annual hurling competition season

- Champions: Ballygalget (10th title)
- Runners-up: Ballycran

The 1992 Down Senior Hurling Championship was the 84th staging of the Down Senior Hurling Championship since its establishment by the Down County Board in 1903.

Portaferry entered the championship as the defending champions.

The final was played on 13 September 1992 at St Patrick's Park, between Ballygalget and Ballycran, in what was their first meeting in the final in two years. Ballygalget won the match by 0–11 to 0–10 to claim their 10th championship title overall and a first title in two years.

== Results ==
=== Final ===
13 September 1992 Final	Ballygalget	0-11 - 0-10	Ballycran	St Patrick's Park
