= 2021 Down Senior Hurling Championship =

Annual hurling competition season

- Sponsor: Morgan Fuels
- Champions: Ballycran (27th title); Liam Savage (captain)
- Runners-up: Portaferry; Conor Mageean (captain)

The 2021 Down Senior Hurling Championship was the 113th staging of the Down Senior Hurling Championship since its establishment by the Down County Board in 1903.

Portaferry entered the championship as the defending champions.

The final was played on 31 October 2021 at Mitchell Park, between Portaferry and Ballycrian, in what was their fourth consecutive meeting in the final. Portaferry won the match by 2–25 to 3–20 to claim their 27th championship title overall and a first title in two years.

== Results ==
=== Final ===
31 October 2021 Final	Ballycran	2-25 - 3-20	Portaferry	Mitchell Park
		Report
