= 2011 Down Senior Hurling Championship =

Annual hurling competition season

- Champions: Ballycran (23rd title)
- Runners-up: Portaferry

The 2011 Down Senior Hurling Championship was the 103rd staging of the Down Senior Hurling Championship since its establishment by the Down County Board in 1903.

Ballygalget entered the championship as the defending champions.

The final was played on 25 September 2011 at Páirc Tomás Ruiséil, between Ballycran and Portaferry, in what was their first meeting in the final in five years. Ballycran won the match by 1–11 to 0–13 to claim their 23rd championship title overall and a first title in two years.

== Results ==
=== Final ===
25 September 2011 Final	Ballycran	1-11 - 0-13	Portaferry	Páirc Tomás Ruiséil
