= 1990 Down Senior Hurling Championship =

Annual hurling competition season

- Champions: Ballygalget (9th title)
- Runners-up: Ballycran

The 1990 Down Senior Hurling Championship was the 82nd staging of the Down Senior Hurling Championship since its establishment by the Down County Board in 1903.

Portaferry entered the championship as the defending champions.

The final was played on 9 September 1990 at St Patrick's Park, between Ballygalget and Ballycran, in what was their first meeting in the final in three years. Ballygalget won the match by 3–13 to 2–12 to claim their ninth championship title overall and a first title in seven years.

== Results ==
=== Final ===
9 September 1990 Final	Ballygalget	3-13 - 2-12	Ballycran	St Patrick's Park
