= Johnny McGrattan =

Irish hurler

Personal information
- Native name: Seánie (Irish)
- Born: 13 January 1977 (age 49) Portaferry, County Down, Northern Ireland
- Height: 5 ft 8 in (173 cm)

Sport
- Sport: Hurling
- Position: Full-forward
Club
- Years: Club
- Ballygalget
Club titles
- Down titles: 9
- Ulster titles: 2
Inter-county*
Years	County	Apps (scores)
1996-	Down	? (0-26)
Inter-county titles
- Ulster titles: 1
- All-Irelands: 0
- NHL: 0
- All Stars: 0
- *Inter County team apps and scores correct as of 18:33, 1 August 2012.

Johnny McGrattan (born 13 January 1977) is a former hurler from Northern Ireland, who played as a forward for the Down senior team.

Stevenson joined the panel during the Oireachtas Tournament in 1996 and was a regular member of the starting fifteen until he was dropped before the 2006 championship. During that time he won one National League (Division 2) medal and one Ulster medal.

At club level McGrattan is a two-time Ulster medalist with Ballygalget. In addition to this he has also won nine county club championship medals.
