= 2020 Down Senior Hurling Championship =

Annual hurling competition season

- Sponsor: Morgan Fuels
- Champions: Portaferry (21st title); Caolan Taggart (captain); Gary Smith (manager)
- Runners-up: Ballycran

The 2020 Down Senior Hurling Championship was the 112th staging of the Down Senior Hurling Championship since its establishment by the Down County Board in 1903.

Ballycran entered the championship as the defending champions.

The final, a replay, was played on 26 September 2020 at Mitchell Park, between Portaferry and Ballycrian, in what was their third successive meeting in the final. Portaferry won the match by 0–15 to 0–13 to claim their 21st championship title overall and a first title in six years.

== Results ==
=== Final ===
19 September 2020 Final	Portaferry	2-18 - 2-18 (aet)	Ballycran	Mitchell Park
		Report

=== Final replay ===
26 September 2020 Final replay	Portaferry	0-15 - 0-13	Ballycran	Mitchell Park
		Report
