= 1996 Down Senior Hurling Championship =

Annual hurling competition season

- Champions: Portaferry (14th title)
- Runners-up: Ballygalget

The 1996 Down Senior Hurling Championship was the 88th staging of the Down Senior Hurling Championship since its establishment by the Down County Board in 1903.

Ballycran entered the championship as the defending champions.

The final was played on 25 August 1996 at McKenna Park, between Portaferry and Ballygalget. Portaferry won the match by 1–14 to 2–05 to claim their 14th championship title overall and a first title in five years.

== Results ==
=== Final ===
25 August 1996 Final	Portaferry	1-14 - 2-05	Ballygalget	McKenna Park
