= 1999 Down Senior Hurling Championship =

Annual hurling competition season

- Champions: Ballygalget (13th title)
- Runners-up: Portaferry

The 1999 Down Senior Hurling Championship was the 91st staging of the Down Senior Hurling Championship since its establishment by the Down County Board in 1903.

Ballygalget entered the championship as the defending champions.

The final, a replay, was played on 11 September 1999 at McKenna Park, between Ballygalget and Portaferry, in what was their fourth consecutive meeting in the final. Ballygalget won the match by 1–11 to 0–08 to claim their 13th championship title overall and a third consecutive title.

== Results ==
=== Final ===
5 September 1999 Final	Ballygalget	0-10 - 0-10	Portaferry	McKenna Park

=== Final replay ===
11 September 1999 Final	Ballygalget	1-11 - 0-08	Portaferry	McKenna Park
