= 1994 Down Senior Hurling Championship =

Annual hurling competition season

- Champions: Ballycran (19th title)
- Runners-up: Ballygalget

The 1994 Down Senior Hurling Championship was the 86th staging of the Down Senior Hurling Championship since its establishment by the Down County Board in 1903.

Ballycran entered the championship as the defending champions.

The final was played on 28 August 1994 at St Patrick's Park, between Ballycran and Ballygalget, in what was their third consecutive meeting in the final. Ballycran won the match by 1–10 to 0–12 to claim their 19th championship title overall and a second consecutive title.

== Results ==
=== Final ===
28 August 1994 Final	Ballycran	1-10 - 0-12	Ballygalget	St Patrick's Park
