= 2006 Down Senior Hurling Championship =

Annual hurling competition season

- Champions: Portaferry (18th title)
- Runners-up: Ballycran

The 2006 Down Senior Hurling Championship was the 98th staging of the Down Senior Hurling Championship since its establishment by the Down County Board in 1903.

Ballygalget entered the championship as the defending champions.

The final was played on 24 September 2006 at Mitchel Park, between Portaferry and Ballycran, in what was their first meeting in the final in five years. Portaferry won the match by 1–15 to 0–14 to claim their 18th championship title overall and a first title in four years.

== Results ==
=== Final ===
24 September 2006 Final	Portaferry	1-15 - 0-14	Ballycran	Mitchel Park
	P Braniff 0-10, J Convery 1-0, N Magee 0-2, A Savage, G Adair, P Mallon 0-1 each.	Report	S Wilson, C McManus 0-4 each, M. Braniff, B Ennis 0-3 each.
