= 1989 Down Senior Hurling Championship =

Annual hurling competition season

- Champions: Portaferry (12th title)
- Runners-up: Ballycran

The 1989 Down Senior Hurling Championship was the 81st staging of the Down Senior Hurling Championship since its establishment by the Down County Board in 1903.

Portaferry entered the championship as the defending champions.

The final was played on 10 September 1989 at Mitchel Park, between Portaferry and Ballycran, in what was their second consecutive meeting in the final. Portaferry won the match by 0–14 to 1–08 to claim their 12th championship title overall and a second consecutive title.

== Results ==
=== Final ===
| 10 September 1989 Final | Portaferry | 0-14 - 1-08 | Ballycran | Mitchel Park |
