= 2019 Down Senior Hurling Championship =

Annual hurling competition season

- Teams: 4
- Sponsor: Morgan Fuels
- Champions: Ballycran (26th title); Pádraig Flynn (captain); Gary Savage (manager)
- Runners-up: Portaferry

The 2019 Down Senior Hurling Championship was the 111th staging of the Down Senior Hurling Championship since its establishment by the Down County Board in 1903. The draw for the opening round fixtures took place on 25 April 2019.

Ballycran entered the championship as the defending champions.

The final was played on 29 September 2019 at Mitchell Park, between Ballycran and Portaferry, in what was their second successive meeting in a final. Ballycran won the match by 1–20 to 1–13 to claim their 26th championship title overall and a second title in succession.

== Results ==
=== Final ===
29 September 2019 Final	Ballycran	1-20 - 1-13	Portaferry	Mitchell Park
