= Down Senior Camogie Championship =

Annual club camogie competition

- Current season or competition: 2026 Down Senior Camogie Championship
- Code: Camogie
- Region: Down (GAA)
- No. of teams: 6
- Title holders: Clonduff GAC (28th title)
- Sponsors: Canal Court Hotel & Spa
- Official website: Official website

The Down Senior Camogie Championship is an annual Camogie competition contested by the top ranking Camogie teams in Down.

Games are played during the summer and autumn months with the county final currently being played in October. The Down County Championship is part of the Ulster Senior Club Camogie Championship. The winners of the Down county final join the senior champions of the other counties to contest the provincial championship.

6 teams currently participate in the Down County Championship.

The 2026 Down Senior Camogie Championship was won by Clonduff. after beating Portaferry 0-19 to 0-08 in the final.

== Format ==
=== Group stage ===
The 6 teams face each other with 2 points awarded for a win and 1 point for a draw. The top 4 teams qualify for the semi-finals.

=== Semi-finals ===
The 1st placed team from the group stage faces the 4th placed team and the 2nd placed team faced the 3rd placed team. The winners qualify for the final.

=== Final ===
The 2 winners from the semi-finals contest the final. The winner becomes the champion and qualifies for the Ulster Senior Club Camogie Championship.

== Teams ==
=== 2026 teams ===
The 6 teams competing in the 2026 Down Senior Camogie Championship were:

Club	Position in 2026	Championship titles	Last championship title
Clonduff	Champion	12	2026
Portaferry	Runners-up	1	2021
Liatroim Fontenoys	Semi-Final	28	2023
Ballycran	Semi-Final	5	2012
Ballygalget	5th	0?	
Ballyholland	6th	0?	

== Qualification for subsequent competitions ==
The Down Senior Camogie Championship winners qualify for the subsequent Ulster Senior Club Camogie Championship.

== Roll of honour ==
Club	Titles	Years won
Liatroim Fontenoys	28	1977, 1984, 1990, 1991, 1992, 1993, 1994, 1995, 1996, 1997, 1998, 1999, 2000, 2001, 2004, 2005, 2013, 2016, 2023 +9 more in between
Clonduff	12	2007, 2009, 2010, 2014, 2017, 2018, 2019, 2020, 2022, 2024, 2025, 2026
Ballycran	5	1967, 1969, 2008, 2011, 2012
Kilkeel	3	1980, 1981, 1983
Newry	2	1975, 1976
An Riocht	1	1982
Portaferry	1	2021

== List of finals ==
=== Legend ===
- Gold – All-Ireland Senior Club champions
- Silver – Ulster Senior Club champions

Year	Winners		Runners-up		Source
Year	Club	Score	Club	Score	Source
2026	Clonduff	0-19	Portaferry	0-08	
2025	Clonduff	1-15	Portaferry	0-10	
2024	Clonduff	0-10	Portaferry	0-07	
2023	Liatroim Fontenoys	0-11	Ballygalget	2-04	
2022	Clonduff				
2021	Portaferry		Liatroim Fontenoys		
2020	Clonduff		Ballygalget		
2019	Clonduff				
2018	Clonduff				
2017	Clonduff	2-08	Ballygalget	0-09	
2016	Liatroim Fontenoys		Portaferry		
2015			Clonduff		
2014	Clonduff				
2013	Liatroim Fontenoys				
2012	Ballycran				
2011	Ballycran				
2010	Clonduff	2-17	Ballycran	1-03	
2009	Clonduff				
2008	Ballycran		Clonduff		
2007	Clonduff		Portaferry		
2006					
2005	Liatroim Fontenoys				
2004	Liatroim Fontenoys				
2003					
2002					
2001	Liatroim Fontenoys				
2000	Liatroim Fontenoys				
1999	Liatroim Fontenoys				
1998	Liatroim Fontenoys				
1997	Liatroim Fontenoys				
1996	Liatroim Fontenoys				
1995	Liatroim Fontenoys				
1994	Liatroim Fontenoys				
1993	Liatroim Fontenoys				
1992	Liatroim Fontenoys				
1991	Liatroim Fontenoys				
1990	Liatroim Fontenoys				
1989					
1988					
1987					
1986					
1985					
1984	Liatroim Fontenoys				
1983	Kilkeel				
1982	An Riocht				
1981	Kilkeel				
1980	Kilkeel				
1979					
1978					
1977	Liatroim Fontenoys				
1976	Newry				
1975	Newry				
1974					
1973					
1972					
1971					
1970					
1969	Ballycran				
1968			Ballycran		
1967	Ballycran				

== See also ==
Ulster Senior Club Camogie Championship

All Ireland Senior Club Camogie Championship
