= 2000 Down Senior Hurling Championship =

Annual hurling competition season

- Champions: Portaferry (15th title)
- Runners-up: Ballygalget

The 2000 Down Senior Hurling Championship was the 92nd staging of the Down Senior Hurling Championship since its establishment by the Down County Board in 1903.

Ballygalget entered the championship as the defending champions.

The final was played on 3 September 2000 at McKenna Park, between Portaferry and Ballygalget, in what was their fifth consecutive meeting in the final. Portaferry won the match by 0–18 to 1–08 to claim their 15th championship title overall and a first title in four years.

== Results ==
=== Final ===
3 September 2000 Final	Portaferry	0-18 - 1-08	Ballygalget	McKenna Park
		Report
