= 2005 Down Senior Hurling Championship =

Annual hurling competition season

- Champions: Ballygalget (16th title)
- Runners-up: Ballycran

The 2005 Down Senior Hurling Championship was the 97th staging of the Down Senior Hurling Championship since its establishment by the Down County Board in 1903.

Ballygalget entered the championship as the defending champions.

The final was played on 16 October 2005 at St Patrick's Park, between Ballygalget and Ballycran, in what was their first meeting in the final in four years. Ballygalget won the match by 3–14 to 0–15 to claim their 16th championship title overall and a third consecutive title.

== Results ==
=== Final ===
16 October 2005 Final	Ballygalget	3-14 - 0-15	Ballycran	McKenna Park
