= 2001 Down Senior Hurling Championship =

Annual hurling competition season

- Champions: Portaferry (16th title)
- Runners-up: Ballycran

The 2001 Down Senior Hurling Championship was the 93rd staging of the Down Senior Hurling Championship since its establishment by the Down County Board in 1903.

Portaferry entered the championship as the defending champions.

The final was played on 2 September 2001 at Mitchel Park, between Portaferry and Ballycran, in what was their first meeting in the final in 10 years. Portaferry won the match by 0–13 to 1–05 to claim their 16th championship title overall and a second consecutive title.

== Results ==
=== Final ===
2 September 2001 Final	Portaferry	0-13 - 1-05	Ballycran	Mitchel Park
