= Gerard McGrattan =

Irish hurler

Personal information
- Native name: Gearóid Mag Reachtain (Irish)
- Nickname: Gerry
- Born: 1972 (age 53–54) Portaferry, County Down, Northern Ireland
- Occupation: engineer
- Height: 6 ft 2 in (188 cm)

Sport
- Sport: Hurling
- Position: Right wing-forward
Club
- Years: Club
- 1989-2006: Portaferry
Club titles
- Down titles: 7
- Ulster titles: 0
Inter-county
- Years: County
- 1992-2004: Down
Inter-county titles
- Ulster titles: 3
- NHL: 1
- All Stars: 1

Gerard McGrattan (born 1972) is an Irish former hurler who played as a right wing-forward for the Down senior team.

McGrattan made his first appearance for the team during the 1992 championship and quickly became a regular player until his retirement at the end of the 2004 championship. During that time he won three Ulster winners' medals and remains the only Down hurler to have won an All Stars Award.

At club level McGrattan played with Portaferry, winning seven county championship winners' medals during a club career that spanned three decades.

== Honours ==
- Ulster Senior Hurling Championship (3) 1992 1995 1997
- National Hurling League Division 2 (1) 2004
- Ulster Under-21 Hurling Championship (1) 1990
- Ulster Minor Hurling Championship (1) 1989
- Ulster Minor Hurling Championship (1) 1989
- Antrim Senior Hurling League (2) 2002 2003
- Down Senior Hurling Championship (7) 1989 1991 1996 2000 2001 2002 2006
