= 2002 Down Senior Hurling Championship =

Annual hurling competition season

- Champions: Portaferry (17th title)
- Runners-up: Ballygalget

The 2002 Down Senior Hurling Championship was the 94th staging of the Down Senior Hurling Championship since its establishment by the Down County Board in 1903.

Portaferry entered the championship as the defending champions.

The final was played on 29 September 2002 at Páirc Tomás Ruiséil in Downpatrick, between Portaferry and Ballygalget, in what was their first meeting in the final in two years. Portaferry won the match by 0–14 to 3–04 to claim their 17th championship title overall and a third consecutive title.

== Results ==
=== Final ===
29 September 2002 Final	Portaferry	0-14 - 3-04	Ballygalget	Páirc Tomás Ruiséil
