= Faugh-a-Ballagh GAA =

Gaelic games club

Faugh-a-Ballagh
- Founded: 1902
- County: Down
- Colours: Red and white
- Grounds: The Marshes

Playing kits
Standard colours

Senior Club Championships
	All Ireland	Ulster champions	Down champions
Football:	-	-	4
Hurling:	-	-	6

Faugh-a-Ballagh was a Gaelic Athletic Association (GAA) club based in Newry, County Down in Northern Ireland. It was established in 1902 and folded in the 1940s.

== History ==
Faugh-a-Ballagh was established in Newry, in 1902, during the Gaelic Revival. It was the first GAA club in the town and held its inaugural meeting in March 1902.

In its early years, Newry Faughs was one of the most successful clubs in the county, winning five hurling championships and four football championships between 1903 and 1910.

The club folded in the 1940s.

== Honours ==
- Down Senior Hurling Championship (6): 1903, 1904, 1907, 1908, 1909, 1930
- Down Senior Football Championship (4): 1903, 1906, 1907, 1909

== See also ==
- Faugh A Ballagh, a battle cry of Irish origin
