= 1995 Down Senior Hurling Championship =

Annual hurling competition season

- Champions: Ballycran (20th title)
- Runners-up: Ballygalget

The 1995 Down Senior Hurling Championship was the 87th staging of the Down Senior Hurling Championship since its establishment by the Down County Board in 1903.

Ballycran entered the championship as the defending champions.

The final was played on 10 September 1995 at St Patrick's Park, between Ballycran and Ballygalget, in what was their fourth consecutive meeting in the final. Ballycran won the match by 0–16 to 1–07 to claim their 20th championship title overall and a third consecutive title.

== Results ==
=== Final ===
10 September 1995 Final	Ballycran	0-16 - 1-07	Ballygalget	St Patrick's Park
