= 2010 Down Senior Hurling Championship =

Annual hurling competition season

- Champions: Ballygalget (18th title)
- Runners-up: Ballycran

The 2010 Down Senior Hurling Championship was the 102nd staging of the Down Senior Hurling Championship since its establishment by the Down County Board in 1903.

Ballycran entered the championship as the defending champions.

The final was played on 26 September 2010 at St Patrick's Park, between Ballygalget and Ballycran, in what was their second consecutive meeting in the final. Ballygalget won the match by 3–19 to 1–13 to claim their 18th championship title overall and a first title in two years.

== Results ==
=== Final ===
26 September 2010 Final	Ballygalget	3-19 - 1-13	Ballycran	St Patrick's Park
	G Johnson 2-5, C Doran 1-0, S Clarke 0-6 (0-5f), D Toner, S Bailie 0-3 each, E Clarke 0-2 (0-2f).	Report	A Clarke 1-1, S Wilson 0-5 (0-4f), J Coyle, C Woods 0-2 each, B Ennis, S Nicholson, A Bell 0-1 each.
