= 1985 Down Senior Hurling Championship =

Annual hurling competition season

- Champions: Ballycran (15th title)
- Runners-up: Portaferry

The 1985 Down Senior Hurling Championship was the 77th staging of the Down Senior Hurling Championship since its establishment by the Down County Board in 1903.

Ballycran entered the championship as the defending champions.

The final was played on 8 September 1985 at St Patrick's Park, between Ballycran and Portaferry. Ballycran won the match to claim their 15th championship title overall and a second consecutive title.
