= 2004 Down Senior Hurling Championship =

Annual hurling competition season

- Champions: Ballygalget (15th title)
- Runners-up: Portaferry

The 2004 Down Senior Hurling Championship was the 96th staging of the Down Senior Hurling Championship since its establishment by the Down County Board in 1903.

Ballygalget entered the championship as the defending champions.

The final was played on 3 October 2004 at McKenna Park, between Ballygalget and Portaferry, in what was their third consecutive meeting in the final. Ballygalget won the match by 1–12 to 1–06 to claim their 15th championship title overall and a second consecutive title.

== Results ==
=== Final ===
3 October 2004 Final	Ballygalget	1-12 - 1-06	Portaferry	McKenna Park
