= 2008 Down Senior Hurling Championship =

Annual hurling competition season

- Champions: Ballygalget (17th title)
- Runners-up: Portaferry

The 2008 Down Senior Hurling Championship was the 100th staging of the Down Senior Hurling Championship since its establishment by the Down County Board in 1903.

Ballycran entered the championship as the defending champions.

The final was played on 5 October 2008 at McKenna Park, between Ballygalget and Portaferry, in what was their first meeting in the final in four years. Ballygalget won the match by 2–13 to 0–08 to claim their 17th championship title overall and a first title in three years.

== Results ==
=== Final ===
5 October 2008 Final	Ballygalget	2-13 - 0-08	Portaferry	McKenna Park
