= Martin Bailie =

Northern Irish hurler (1962–2022)

Personal information
- Native name: Máirtín Ó Báille (Irish)
- Nickname: Spike
- Born: 7 June 1962 Newtownards, County Down, Northern Ireland
- Died: 3 September 2022 (aged 60) Newry, County Down, Northern Ireland
- Occupation: Architect

Sport
- Sport: Hurling
- Position: Centre-forward
Club
- Years: Club
- Ballygalget
Club titles
- Down titles: 5
Inter-county
- Years: County
- 1982-1997: Down
Inter-county titles
- Ulster titles: 3
- All-Irelands: 0
- NHL: 0
- All Stars: 0

Martin Bailie (7 June 1962 – 3 September 2022) was a Northern Irish hurler. At club level he played with Ballygalget and was also a member of the Down senior hurling team.

== Career ==
Bailie first played hurling at juvenile and underage levels with the Ballygalget club. He eventually progressed onto the club's senior team and won five Down SHC titles between 1982 and 1997.

Bailie first appeared on the inter-county scene at a time when the Down minor hurling team were competing in the Leinster MHC. He later won an Ulster U21HC title in 1983. By this stage Bailie had begun his 15-year career with the Down senior hurling team. He lined out when Down were beaten by London in the 1988 All-Ireland SHC B final, the same year he was chosen as a replacement All-Star. Bailie later won Ulster SHC medals in 1992, 1995 and 1997. His inter-county performances also earned a call-up to the Ulster team in the Railway Cup.

== Personal life and death ==
Bailie was married to Sheila and had three children, Naomi, Shane and Caolan. His daughter, Naomi Bailie, was a Sinn Féin councillor who served as the first chairperson of the Newry, Mourne and Down District Council in 2015. Bailie was diagnosed with frontotemporal dementia in 2016. He died on 3 September 2022, at the age of 60.

== Honours ==
Ballygalget

- Down Senior Hurling Championship: 1982, 1983, 1990, 1992, 1997

Down

- Ulster Senior Hurling Championship: 1992, 1995, 1997
- Ulster Under-21 Hurling Championship: 1983
