= 1991 Down Senior Hurling Championship =

Annual hurling competition season

- Champions: Portaferry (13th title)
- Runners-up: Ballycran

The 1991 Down Senior Hurling Championship was the 83rd staging of the Down Senior Hurling Championship since its establishment by the Down County Board in 1903.

Ballygalget entered the championship as the defending champions, however, they were beaten by Portaferry in the semi-final.

The final was played on 22 September 1991 at Mitchel Park, between Portaferry and Ballycran, in what was their first meeting in the final in two years. Portaferry won the match by 0–10 to 1–05 to claim their 13th championship title overall and a first title in two years.

== Results ==
=== Final ===
22 September 1991 Final	Portaferry	0-10 - 1-05	Ballycran	Mitchel Park
