= 2009 Down Senior Hurling Championship =

Annual hurling competition season

- Sponsor: Newry Democrat
- Champions: Ballycran (22nd title)
- Runners-up: Ballygalget

The 2009 Down Senior Hurling Championship was the 101st staging of the Down Senior Hurling Championship since its establishment by the Down County Board in 1903.

Ballygalget entered the championship as the defending champions.

The final was played on 27 September 2009 at Páirc Tomás Ruiséil, between Ballycran and Ballygalget, in what was their first meeting in the final in two years. Ballycran won the match by 1–14 to 0–12 to claim their 22nd championship title overall and a first title in two years.

== Results ==
=== Final ===
27 September 2009 Final	Ballycran	1-14 - 0-12	Ballygalget	Páirc Tomás Ruiséil
	M Braniff 1-1, S Wilson 0-6 (0-5f), J Coyle 0-5, G Savage, P Keith 0-1 each.	Report	E Clarke 0-8 (0-3f), M Coulter 0-2, D Toner, G Johnson 0-1 each.
