= Gary Savage (hurler) =

Down hurler

Personal information
- Nickname: Gaza
- Born: Ballycran, County Down
- Height: 6 ft 0 in (183 cm)

Sport
- Sport: Hurling
- Position: Centre Half-back
Club
- Years: Club
- 1990s–2009: Ballycran
Club titles
- Down titles: 5
- Ulster titles: 1
- All-Ireland Titles: 0
Inter-county
- Years: County
- 1990–2007: Down
Inter-county titles
- Ulster titles: 3
- All-Irelands: 0
- NHL: 1
- All Stars: 0

Gary Savage (born 1970 in Ballycran, County Down) is an Irish sportsman. He played hurling with his local club Ballycran and was a member of the Down senior county team from the 1990s until the 2000s.

== Playing career ==
=== Club ===
Savage played his hurling with his local club in Ballycran and enjoyed much success. He first came to prominence on the club's senior team in the late 1980s, however, Ballycran were going through a hugely unsuccessful period at the time, after losing five county finals in-a-row. Savage won his first county senior championship winners’ medal in 1993, following a defeat of Ballygalget. He later lined out in the Ulster club final with Cushendall providing the opposition. A 2–10 to 0–12 victory gave Savage his first Ulster club winners’ medal. Ballycran were subsequently defeated by Toomevara in the All-Ireland semi-final.

Savage added two more county titles to his collection in 1994 and 1995. After more than a decade out of the limelight Ballycran bounced back in 2007, with Savage adding a fourth county winners’ medal to his collection.

=== Inter-county ===
Savage first came to prominence on the inter-county scene as a member of the Down senior hurling team in the early 1990s. It was the beginning of the county's most successful period ever.

In 1992, Savage won his first Ulster SHC winners' medal following a 2–16 to 0–11 defeat of provincial kingpins Antrim. The 'Mourne' men later made their first-ever championship visit to Croke Park. The All-Ireland SHC semi-final pitted them against Cork. The game saw Savage's side nearly cause an upset; however, in the end Cork won by 2–17 to 1–11.

After surrendering their provincial title to Antrim in 1993 and 1994, Savage added a second Ulster memento to his collection in 1995 following a thrilling draw and a replay of the provincial decider. An unconvincing defeat of London in the All-Ireland SHC quarter-final allowed Down to advance to the semi-final where reigning All-Ireland champions Offaly provided the opposition. Down played well; however, in the end Savage's side were defeated by 2–19 to 2–8.

Two years later in 1997, Down regained the Ulster SHC title, with Savage adding a third provincial winners' medal to his collection. The introduction of the so-called 'back-door' system saw Down later face Tipperary in the All-Ireland SHC quarter-final at Semple Stadium. That game turned into a rout, as Tipp won easily by 3–24 to 3–8.

The next few years proved to an unhappy time for Down's hurling team as Antrim and Derry reclaimed their status as the standard-bearers in the provincial championship. Savage lined out in further Ulster SHC finals in 2001, 2002, 2004, 2005 and 2007; however, he ended up on the losing side on all six occasions.

In 2005, a restructuring of the championship saw Down participate in the Christy Ring Cup. Clarke's side did well in their debut year and even reached the final of the competition. Westmeath provided the opposition on that occasion; however, at the full-time whistle Down were defeated by 1–23 to 2–18. The team, however, have failed to build on this in recent years.

=== Inter-provincial ===
Savage has also lined out with Ulster in the inter-provincial hurling competition. He has enjoyed little success with his province as Ulster have failed to even qualify for the Railway Cup final in recent years. Savage's most successful year with Ulster came in 1995 when the northern province took on Munster in the final. That game turned into a closed affair with Munster narrowly winning by 0–13 to 1–9.

=== International ===
Savage represented his country in the Shinty–Hurling International Series. He was a member of the panel in 2006 as Ireland lost by 2(5) to 2(13) to Scotland at Croke Park.

== Managerial ==
Savage was manager of Ballycran in 2009 when they won the Down Championship in a defeat of Ballygalget. He worked as assistant manager to Stephen McAree, when they secured the 2015 Down Senior Hurling Championship.

== Honours ==
Player

- Down Senior Hurling Championship (5): 1993, 1994, 1995, 2007, 2009
- Ulster Senior Hurling Championship (3): 1992, 1995, 1997
- National Hurling League Division 2 (1): 2004
- Ulster Senior Club Hurling Championship (1): 1993

Manager

- Down Senior Hurling Championship (3): 2011, 2015, 2018

== References and sources ==
Notes

Sources

- Donegan, Des (2005). The Complete Handbook of Gaelic Games. Blackrock: DBA Publications. ISBN 0-9551115-0-1.
