= Down Junior Football Championship =

- Irish: Cluiche Ceannais Péil An Dúin
- Founded: 1920
- Trophy: Sean McCashin Cup
- Title holders: Kilclief (3rd title)
- Most titles: Drumaness (7 titles)
- Sponsors: The Parador Lodge

The Down Junior Football Championship is an annual Gaelic football competition contested by lower-tier Down GAA clubs. The Down County Board of the Gaelic Athletic Association has organised it since 1920. The national media covers the competition.

== History ==
In the 2016 final Drumgath held Teconnaught in what was a surprising result. Drumgath then had a landslide win in the replay to secure their first ever JFC crown.

== Honours ==
The winners of the Down Junior Championship qualify to represent their county in the Ulster Junior Club Football Championship. The winners can, in turn, go on to play in the All-Ireland Junior Club Football Championship. Also, the winners of the Down Junior Championship automatically qualify for the following season's Intermediate Championship.

== Finals listed by year ==
(r) = replay

Year	Winner	Score	Score	Opponent
1920	Castlewellan			
1927	Kilcoo			
1928	Drumnaconnor			
1929	Ballylough			
1930	Burren			
1932	Warrenpoint			
1933	Kilkeel			
1934	Gargory			
1935	Burrenbridge			
1936	Ballykinlar			
1937	Glenn			
1939	Kilkeel			
1940	Warrenpoint			
1941	Ballykinlar			
1942	Kilclief			
1943	Ardtole			Ballylough
1944	Clann na Banna			
1945	Ballykinlar			
1946	Saul			
1947	Tullylish*			Kilclief
1948	Barnmeen			
1949	Tullylish*	0–03	0–02	Ballynahinch
1950	Kilkeel			
1951	Dromara			
1952	Burren			
1953	Magheral			
1954	Loughinisland			
1955	Ballykinlar			
1956	Cabra Harps			
1957	Dundrum			
1958	Loughinisland			
1959	Clann na Banna			
1960	Kilkeel			
1961	RGU Downpatrick			
1962	Bryansford			
1963	Ballyholland Harps			
1964	Saul			
1965	Drumaness			
1966	Liatroim Fontenoys			
1967	Bryansford			
1968	Tullylish			
1969	Drumaness			
1970	Saval			
1971	Greencastle			
1972	Ballyholland Harps			
1973	Newry Shamrocks II			
1974	Clann na Banna			
1975	Ballymartin			
1976	Dundrum			
1977	Greencastle			
1978	Newry Mitchels			
1979	Atticall			Longstone
1980	Annaclone			
1981	Mayobridge			
1982	Annaclone			
1983	Annsborough			Drumaness
1984	RGU Downpatrick			
1985	Drumaness			
1986	Carryduff			
1987	St Michael's			
1988	Liatroim Fontenoys			
1989	Drumaness			
1990	Annsborough	0-11	0-7	Castlewellan II
1991	St Michael's			
1993	Castlewellan II			
1994	Ardglass			Darragh Cross
1995	Ballykinlar			Bright
1996	Kilclief			Bright
1997	Glasdrumman			Dundrum
1998	Ballykinlar			Darragh Cross
1999	Clann na Banna			Bright
2000	Ardglass			
2001	Newry Mitchels			
2002	Ardglass			
2003	Glenn			
2004	St Michael's			
2005	Dundrum			Bright
2006	Bredagh	1–08 (r)	0–05 (r)	Teconnaught
2007	Newry Bosco	2–11	0–02	Drumaness
2008	St John's	0–09	0–05	Bright
2009	Glenn	1–12	1–08	Teconnaught
2010	Drumaness	1–12	1–06	Newry Bosco
2011	Bredagh	4–10	0–09	Dromara
2012	Dundrum	0–15	0–06	Aghaderg
2013	Teconnaught	0–08; 1–09 (r)	0–08; 0–08 (r)	Dromara
2014	Drumaness	0–14	0–08	Kilclief
2015	Glasdrumman	2–11	2–07	Ardglass
2016	Drumgath	1–07; 4–16 (r)	0–10; 0–05 (r)	Teconnaught
2017	Dundrum	0–14	1–02	Bright
2018	Teconnaught	0–08	0–07	Kilclief
2019	Bright	1–14	0–15	Aughlisnafin
2020	St Paul's	2–06	0–10	Aughlisnafin
2021	Aughlisnafin	2–11	2–08	Dundrum
2022	Teconnaught	1–13	0–12	Dromara
2023	Drumaness	3–08	1–10	Ardglass
2024	Dromara	2–08	1–09	Aughlisnafin
2025	Ardglass	1–11	0–10	Kilclief
2026	Kilclief	1–09	0–08	Drumaness

== Wins listed by club ==
#	Team	Wins	Years won
1	Drumaness	7	1965, 1969, 1985, 1989, 2010, 2014, 2023
2	Ballykinlar	6	1936, 1941, 1945, 1955, 1995, 1998
3	Dundrum	5	1957, 1976, 2005, 2012, 2017
4	Kilkeel	4	1933, 1939, 1950, 1960
4	Clann na Banna	4	1944, 1959, 1974, 1999
4	Ardglass	4	1994, 2000, 2002, 2025
7	Glenn	3	1937, 2003, 2009
7	Kilclief	3	1942, 1996, 2026
7	Tullylish * as St Patrick's, Laurencetown	3	1947*, 1949*, 1968
7	St Michael's	3	1987, 1991, 2004
7	Teconnaught	3	2013, 2018, 2022
12	Annsborough	2	1983, 1990
12	Burren	2	1930, 1952
12	Warrenpoint	2	1932, 1940
12	Saul	2	1946, 1964
12	Dromara	2	1951, 2024
12	Loughinisland	2	1954, 1958
12	RGU Downpatrick	2	1961, 1984
12	Bryansford	2	1962, 1967
12	Ballyholland Harps	2	1963, 1972
12	Liatroim Fontenoys	2	1966, 1988
12	Greencastle	2	1971, 1977
12	Newry Mitchels	2	1978, 2001
12	Annaclone	2	1980, 1982
12	Glasdrumman	2	1997, 2015
12	Bredagh	2	2006, 2011
27	Castlewellan	1	1920
27	Kilcoo	1	1927
27	Drumnaconnor	1	1928
27	Ballylough	1	1929
27	Gargory	1	1934
27	Burrenbridge	1	1935
27	Ardtole	1	1943
27	Barnmeen	1	1948
27	Magheral	1	1953
27	Cabra Harps	1	1956
27	Saval	1	1970
27	Newry Shamrocks II	1	1973
27	Ballymartin	1	1975
27	Atticall	1	1979
27	Mayobridge	1	1981
27	Carryduff	1	1986
27	Castlewellan II	1	1993
27	Newry Bosco	1	2007
27	St John's	1	2008
27	Drumgath	1	2016
27	Bright	1	2019
27	St Paul's	1	2020
27	Aughlisnafin	1	2021
