= 1987 Down Senior Hurling Championship =

Annual hurling competition season

- Champions: Ballycran (17th title)
- Runners-up: Ballygalget

The 1987 Down Senior Hurling Championship was the 79th staging of the Down Senior Hurling Championship since its establishment by the Down County Board in 1903.

Ballycran entered the championship as the defending champions.

The final was played on 13 September 1987 at St Patrick's Park, between Ballycran and Ballygalget, in what was their first meeting in the final in three years. Ballycran won the match by 0–17 to 1–08 to claim their 17th championship title overall and a record fourth consecutive title.

== Results ==
=== Final ===
13 September 1987 Final	Ballycran	0-17 - 1-08	Ballygalget	St Patrick's Park
