= 1986 Down Senior Hurling Championship =

Annual hurling competition season

- Champions: Ballycran (16th title)
- Runners-up: Portaferry

The 1986 Down Senior Hurling Championship was the 78th staging of the Down Senior Hurling Championship since its establishment by the Down County Board in 1903.

Ballycran entered the championship as the defending champions.

The final was played on 14 September 1986 at St Patrick's Park, between Ballycran and Portaferry, in what was their second consecutive meeting in the final. Ballycran won the match by 3–06 to 1–11 to claim their 16th championship title overall and a third consecutive title.

== Results ==
=== Final ===
14 September 1986 Final	Ballycran	3-06 - 1-11	Portaferry	St Patrick's Park
