= Kilclief Ben Dearg GAC =

Kilclief Ben Dearg
- Cill Cleithe Ben Dearg
- Founded: 1901
- County: Down
- Colours: Green and red
- Grounds: St Malachy's Park

Playing kits
Standard colours

Senior Club Championships
	All Ireland	Ulster champions	Down champions
Hurling:	0	0	23

Kilclief Ben Dearg GAC is a Gaelic Athletic Association club located in Kilclief, County Down, Northern Ireland. The club fields teams in both hurling and Gaelic football.

== History ==
Located in the parish of Kilclief on the shores of Strangford Lough, Kilclief Ben Dearg GAC was founded in 1901, however, Gaelic games had been played in the parish before that. Hearts of Down and the Red Hands clubs amalgamated to form Ben Dearg, who took their name from the nearby red cliffs of Killard. Their record of 23 Down Senior Hurling Championship titles stood from 1956 until it was surpassed by Ballycran almost 60 years later. A decline in hurling coincided with an upsurge in Gaelic football from the 1960s onwards.

== Honours ==
- Down Senior Hurling Championship (23): 1912, 1913, 1914, 1915, 1916, 1917, 1918, 1919, 1920, 1925, 1931, 1932, 1933, 1935, 1939, 1942, 1943, 1944, 1945, 1947, 1954, 1955, 1956
- Down Intermediate Football Championship (1): 2011
- Down Junior Football Championship (2): 1942, 1996
