= 2014 Down Senior Hurling Championship =

Annual hurling competition season

The 2014 Down Senior Hurling Championship was the 106th staging of the Down Senior Hurling Championship since its establishment by the Down County Board in 1903. The championship began on 13 September 2014 and ended on 28 September 2014.

Ballygalget were the defending champions, however, they were defeated in the semi-final stage. St. Patrick's GAC, Portaferry won the title following a 1–12 to 1–11 defeat of Ballycran in the final.

== Results ==
=== Semi-final ===
13 September 2014 Semi-final	St. Patrick's GAC, Portaferry	2-25 – 1-8	Ballygalget	McKenna Park
17:00				Referee: É Hassen

=== Final ===
28 September 2014 Final	Ballycran	1-11 – 1-12	St. Patrick's GAC, Portaferry	St. Patrick's Park
15:30				Referee: P Braniff
