= 1984 Down Senior Hurling Championship =

Annual hurling competition season

- Champions: Ballycran (14th title)
- Runners-up: Ballygalget

The 1984 Down Senior Hurling Championship was the 76th staging of the Down Senior Hurling Championship since its establishment by the Down County Board in 1903.

Ballygalget entered the championship as the defending champions.

The final was played on 16 September 1984 at St Patrick's Park, between Ballycran and Ballygalget. Ballycran won the match by 2–10 to 1–11 to claim their 14th championship title overall and a first title in four years.

== Results ==
=== Final ===
16 September 1984 Final	Ballycran	2-10 - 1-11	Ballygalget	St Patrick's Park
