= Kilclief =

Coordinates: 54.3357°N 5.5447°W

Kilclief: Irish: Cill Cléithe
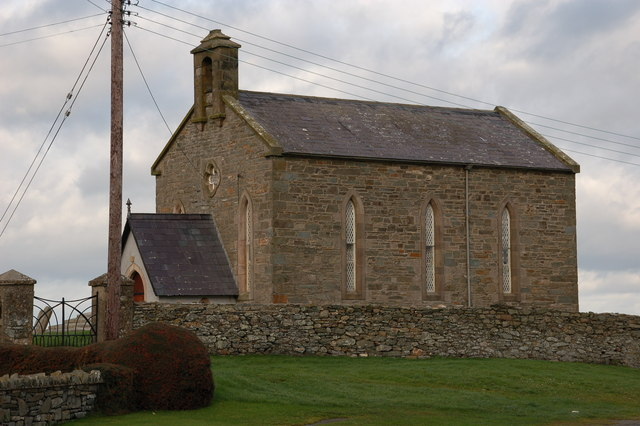
- Kilclief (Church of Ireland) parish church

- Location within County Down
- Irish grid reference: J 597 457
- County: County Down
- Country: Northern Ireland
- Sovereign state: United Kingdom
- Post town: DOWNPATRICK
- Postcode district: BT30
- Dialling code: 028
- Police: Northern Ireland
- Fire: Northern Ireland
- Ambulance: Northern Ireland
- UK Parliament: South Down

Kilclief (from the Irish Cill Cléithe meaning 'church of wattle') is a civil parish in County Down, Northern Ireland. It is situated in the historic baronies of Lecale Lower and Lecale Upper. It is also a townland of 623 acres.

The site of Kilclief parish church dates from the early Christian period and was granted by Bishop Malachy 3rd to the Abbey of Saint Patrick of Down in 1183.

== Townlands ==
Kilclief civil parish contains a number townlands, including:

- Acre McCricket (Acra Mhic Riocaird; the smallest townland in County Down at 4.9 acres (2 ha))
- Ballywoodan
- Cloghy
- Glebe
- Isle McCricket
- Kilclief (Cill Chléithe)
- Killard Lower
- Killard Upper
- Ross
- Tullyfoyle Lower
- Tullyfoyle Upper

== See also ==
- Kilclief Castle
- Kilclief Ben Dearg GAC
- List of civil parishes of County Down
