= Ballela GAC =

Gaelic games club in County Down

Ballela
- Baile Aileach
- Founded: 1901
- County: Down
- Colours: Green, Gold, White
- Grounds: Ballela GAC Grounds
- Coordinates: 54°21′17″N 6°08′54″W

Playing kits
Standard colours

Senior Club Championships
	All Ireland	Ulster champions	Down champions
Hurling:	-	-	7

Ballela Gaelic Athletic Club, also called Ballela Camogie and Hurling Club or Éire Óg Ballela, is a hurling and camogie club based in Ballela, County Down, Northern Ireland.

== History ==
The club was founded in 1901 and was for a time among the leading clubs of County Down, winning the Down SHC seven times between 1936 and 1952. They won the Down JHC several times in recent years, including in 2024.

== Honours ==
=== Hurling ===
- Down Senior Hurling Championship (7): 1936, 1937, 1940, 1941, 1948, 1951, 1952
- Down Junior Hurling Championship (11): 1943, 1950, 1957, 1972, 1982, 2003, 2008, 2015, 2017, 2021, 2024
