= Carryduff GAC =

Gaelic football club

- CLG Cheathrú Aodha Dhuibh
- Founded: 1972
- County: Down
- Colours: Purple and Gold
- Grounds: Páirc Aodha Dhuibh
- Coordinates: 54°31′50″N 5°53′17″W

Playing kits
Standard colours

Carryduff GAC (Irish: CLG Cheathrú Aodha Dhuibh) is a Gaelic Athletic Association club based in the town of Carryduff in County Down, Northern Ireland. The club fields approximately 50 teams from Under 6s to Senior in men and ladies’ football, hurling, camogie, rounders, and handball. Carryduff GAC has around 1,500 members, making it one the biggest clubs in Ulster.

== History ==
In 1971, a group of parents in the southern suburbs of Belfast came together to form a schoolboys Gaelic football team. The club was formed a year later, in 1972, and entered a team in the East Down Junior Football League. The team won all 24 of their league games and secured the club's first trophy. They also reached the final of the Down Junior Championship, where they lost to Newry Shamrocks II.

In 1975, Carryduff won the East Down League Shield and they retained the shield in 1976.

In 1977, the Intermediate League Title was won by Carryduff. In 1980, Carryduff claimed the All-County League Division III title.

In addition to the football teams, the club is also involved in Scór, with the Carryduff Ballad Group winning the All-Ireland title in 1983. Handball was also introduced in 1985. In 1986, Carryduff's senior footballers won Division 3 and the Junior Championship.

In the 1990s, four of the club's players, Greg Blaney, Neil Collins, Mark McCartan and John Kelly, featured in the Down senior football team.

After almost 30 years without a permanent home, Páirc Aodha Dhuibh was opened in 2001. The following year, in 2002, the first ladies football team was formed. Hurling was introduced in 2003, and a clubhouse was opened in 2004.

In 2006, the Ladies footballers win their first League & Intermediate Championship Double. In 2011, the minor hurlers won the minor championship. In 2015, the minor Ladies team won their first Minor County title in football.

In 2017, the senior Ladies team won the club's first ever Senior County Football Championship title. Also in 2017, the club's 3G, ball wall and hub open. Also, the Male U21 Footballers won their first ever County Championship.

In 2020, Carryduff played in their first Down Senior Football Championship Final against Kilcoo GAC. The Carryduff men's team lost 0-9 to 0-16 in Pairc Esler. Carryduff won the Down Intermediate Club Hurling Championship in 2020 when they beat Liatroim Fontenoys 2-15 to 1-12 in the final. During 2021, Carryduff opened a "Health & Wellbeing Centre" with facilities for strength training, injury prevention and rehabilitation.

In 2023 Carryduff the senior mens team won the Division 1 All County Football league title. In the summer of 2023, Carryduff GAC hosted the Ulster LGFA Regional Féile. Also in 2023, the U15 Carryduff boys won the Féile Peil na nÓg Division 1 Shield Final (1-2 to 0-4) in Claremorris, County Mayo. Carryduff then went on to win the Ulster Ladies Gaelic Minor Club Final in 2023 when they beat Lurgan GFC by a close margin of 4 points, the final scoring being: 3-3(12) for Carryduff to 0-8(8) for Lurgan Ladies GFC in Augher, County Tyrone.

In 2024, Carryduff beat Dungloe GAC, 3-09 to 1-3, to win the Ulster Ladies Minor Club title. In April 2024, the Carryduff Camogs won the Down Camogie Division 3 Feile, in Portaferry GAC. In October 2024, the Carryduff U16 ladies footballers won the A Championship. During 2024, the club also opened a new (third) playing pitch, and introduced the "Carryduff All Stars" programme. This programme was designed for those with additional needs who may not be in a position to take part in a typical team game.

In 2025, Carryduff qualified for their second Down Senior Football Championship final after defeating Burren GAC 0–20 to 1–09 in the semi-final. Carryduff, however, lost to Kilcoo in the final on 19 October 2025.

== Honours ==
=== Male football ===
- Down Junior Football Championship (1): 1986
- ACFL Division One (1): 2023

=== Ladies football ===
- LGFA Down Division One League (1): 2025
- A Ulster Ladies Gaelic Minor Club title (2): 2023, 2024
- Delia McCarron Minor A Championship (1): 2025

=== Hurling ===
- Down Intermediate Hurling Championship (1): 2020
