= Clonduff GAC =

Gaelic sports club in County Down, Northern Ireland

Clonduff
- Chluain Daimh
- Founded: 1887
- County: Down
- Nickname: The Yellas
- Colours: Yellow and White
- Grounds: Clonduff Park
- Coordinates: 54°11′59″N 6°08′05″W

Playing kits
Standard colours

Senior Club Championships
	All Ireland	Ulster champions	Down champions
Football:	-	-	10
Camogie:	-	-	12

Clonduff Gaelic Athletic Club is a Gaelic Athletic Association club, based in Hilltown County Down, Northern Ireland. It represents the 2 areas that make up the Clonduff parish, namely Hilltown and Cabra.

Clonduff Park, photographed in 2013

== History ==
Press reports show the history of Gaelic football in Clonduff dates to at least 1887, when the parish had two teams: the Hilltown Amateurs and The Red Hands. Gaelic games flourished for a few years but then subsided and it was not until 1910 that the parish again fielded a Gaelic football team. During the next ten years the parish fielded teams at Junior and Senior level under names such as The Emeralds, The Harps and The Sarsfields.

The modern Clonduff Shamrocks club was founded in 1920. Success on the playing field over the next few years was commonplace. For most of the 1930s, the club was less successful, but re-emerged in the early 1940s. When Down won the 1946 All Ireland, Clonduff provided six of the panel.

In 1955, the club split into two distinct entities – Cabra and Hilltown – the two ends of the parish. Two years later they met in the county final. The teams amalgamated again in 1959 and the following year two of their players won All-Ireland Senior football medals with Kevin Mussen being the first man from the north to bring the Sam Maguire Cup over the border.

The club opened its own grounds in 1968 and became one of the leading clubs in the newly formed Scór competitions.

In the GAA's centenary year, Clonduff published its McNamee Award winning history and in 1987 when Down won its second All Ireland Minor Championship, the club provided six of the panel. In the All Ireland wins of 1991 and 1994, Clonduff's Ross Carr played a significant role. Cathal Murray was also on the panel in 1991.

Clonduff are one of the few clubs in the county who have senior teams in all 5 codes (football, ladies football, hurling, camogie and handball).

In recent times, the clubs camogie team have been the most successful in the club. Since their first Senior Championship in 2007, they have won in total 12 county championships the last in 2026, three Ulster Club Intermediate Championships and 2 All Ireland Intermediate Club Championships .Firstly in 2018, when they became the 1st team to win a 15-a-side All Ireland in the clubs History, beating Gailitir from Waterford in the Final. They then repeated the feat by winning a 2nd in 2022, this time, defeating the famous James Stephens' Club from Kilkenny.

== Club crest ==
The team crest depicts a scene with an ox, a thorn bush and a church. The crest represents a tale associated with the 6th-century saint, St Comghall of Bangor. Comghall reputedly sent his followers to this area of County Down to spread Christianity. They began building their church in the townland of Ballynanny (located on The Kilkeel Road below Spelga Dam). Each morning, the previous day's work would be demolished. Upon investigation, it was discovered that an ox, belonging to the local druid came down from the mountain (The Mournes) each night and razed the building. One of the monks cut a thorn stick and stuck it into the ground between the ox's meadow and the new church. The stick grew into a thorn bush and the monk defied the ox to pass the thorn bush - it never did and the building of the church was completed. The area where the thorn bush allegedly grew is known as Bushtown to this day. The church was eventually destroyed during the Cromwellian invasion of Ireland in 1649. The remains of the church are still standing today on the Kilkeel Road end of Old Clonduff Road.

== Milestones ==
Year	Event
1887	The Banbridge Chronicle of 6 November 1398 carried an account of a Gaelic Football match between Ballyroney (Rathfriland) and a Clonduff team known as The Hilltown Amateurs
1888	A team from Lenish (one of Clonduff's 14 townlands) competed in a Gaelic Football Tournament for a "set of crosses"
1888	A Clonduff team known as the "Red Hands" played two games against St Patrick's Mayobridge in May 1888
1898	A team from Cabra called "The Harps" and one from Hilltown called the "Ninety-Eights" took part in the ’98 tournament organised by the Young Ireland League to commemorate the Centenary of 1798
1912	The "Frontier Sentinel" dated 9 April 1912 gives a report of a 1st round County Championship meeting between Mayobridge and a Clonduff team called "Hilltown". The Hilltown team read: John Crilly, Bernard O’Hagan, Patrick Morgan, James Magill, James Brady, Michael Fegan, Arthur Ronan, Hugh Doyle, Hugh Morgan, Michael Morgan, James Brown, Frank O’Hare, John O’Hagan
1916	Registrations – still extant – show that two teams, known as "Emeralds Gaelic Football Club" and "Cabra", were registered with the Down County Board of 1916–17
1916	An unofficial team known as "John Attey’s Men" or "Faugh an Ballagh" played games here and there during this period. A report of a famous match between Mullaghmore and John Attey's Men, played on Easter Sunday 1916 still lives on in the folk memory of the district
1918	Clonduff take part in "The Gaelic Sunday" protest matches of 4 August 1918 called in defiance of the ban on Gaelic matches under The Defence of the Realm Act
1918	Clonduff men John McPolin and John McAlinden play for Down on 9 May against Louth in Newcastle
1920	A new Parish team called Clonduff Shamrocks was formed and entered in Shanahan Cup Competition by Willie Woods and John McPolin. "The jerseys were yellow and there were Shamrocks embroidered on them. Two girls, Maggie O’Hare and Sarah Magennis it was who sewed them on. Their playing pitch was John Murphy’s and it was Paddy Murphy who gave the pound to enter the team."
1920	Clonduff win Shanahan Cup
1921	George Mussen chosen on the Railway Cup Panel
1922	Clonduff win Shanahan Cup
1926	Clonduff win McLoughlin Cup
1930	Clonduff win their first Down Senior Championship
1931	On 13 September, Dan Mussen becomes first Clonduff man to play in an All-Ireland Football Semi-Final
1932	Club wins The Shanahan Cup outright
1934	George Mussen captains the first Down team to play in Croke Park
1935	Jimmy Doyle in Ulster Railway Cup panel
1937	Clonduff re-enters South Down and Mourne League
1938	Armagh play Down in National League in Hilltown with Jimmy Doyle starring at right full-forward
1943	Clonduff defeat Ardtole by 15 points to 11 to win Down Junior Championship on 12 September but Ardtole awarded game on an objection
1944	Clonduff win their 2nd Senior County Championship
1945	Clonduff win their 3rd Senior County Championship
1946	Down win Junior All-Ireland and Clonduff have on the panel: Henry, Tom and Pat Brown, Eddie Grant, Paddy O’Hagan and Andy Murnin
1947	Clonduff win their 4th Senior County Championship
1949	Clonduff win their 5th Senior County Championship
1949	James Brown on Railway Cup panel
1952	Clonduff win League, Championship (6th) and County Sevens
1953	Clonduff's 19-year-old Kevin Mussen selected on Ulster Railway Cup
1956	Cabra Harps win Down Junior Championship
1957	The two Parish teams – Cabra Harps and The Shamrocks – meet in County Senior Championship final – Shamrocks win
1959	Patsy O’Hagan scores 2 goals in a 3–9 to 1–4 victory for Down in the Wembley Tournament
