= Down Senior Hurling Championship =

Annual hurling competition

- Current season or competition: 2026 Down Senior Hurling Championship
- Irish: Craobh Iomána Sinsearach an Dún
- Code: Hurling
- Founded: 1903; 123 years ago
- Region: Down (GAA)
- Trophy: Jeremiah McVeagh Cup
- No. of teams: 6
- Title holders: Portaferry (26th title)
- Most titles: Ballycran (27 titles)
- Sponsors: Morgan Fuels
- Official website: Down GAA

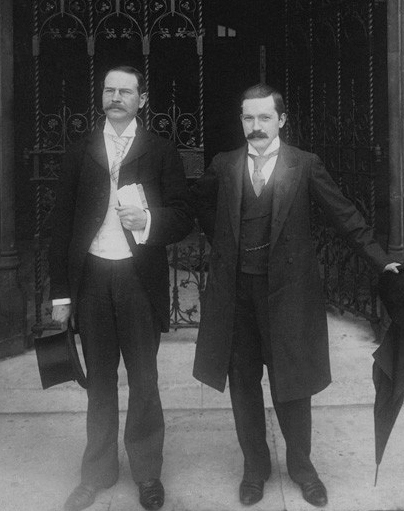
James McVeagh (right), pictured in 1898

The Down Senior Hurling Championship (known for sponsorship reasons as the Morgan Fuels Down GAA Senior Hurling Championship and abbreviated to the Down SHC) is an annual hurling competition contested by top-tier Down GAA clubs. The Down County Board of the Gaelic Athletic Association has organised it since 1903.

Portaferry are the title holders, defeating Ballygalget by 2-28 to 2-17 in the 2026 final.

== History ==
Faugh-a-Ballagh won the inaugural Down SHC in 1903.

The competition has been won by ten teams, nine of which have won it more than once. Ballycran is the most successful team in the tournament's history, having won it 27 times. No team outside Ballycran, Portaferry and Ballygalget have won the title since Kilclief's 23rd victory in 1956.

== Format ==
Introduced in 1903 as the Down Senior Hurling Championship, it was initially a straight knockout tournament open only to senior-ranking club teams, with its winner reckoned as the Down county champion. In its present format, six clubs play each other in a group stage. The top four teams proceed to a knock-out stage.

== Teams ==
=== 2026 teams ===
The 6 teams competing in the 2025 Down Senior Hurling Championship were:

Club	Location	Colours	Position in 2026	In championship since	Championship titles	Last championship title
Ballycran	Rubane	Black and amber	Semi-finals	?	27	2021
Ballygalget	Ards Peninsula	Green and white	Runners-up	?	21	2017
Bredagh	Ballynafeigh	Maroon and white	Group stage	?	0	—
Carryduff	Carryduff	Purple and gold	Group stage	2024	0	—
Liatroim Fontenoys	Leitrim	Green, white and yellow	Semi-finals	2023	2	1928
Portaferry	Portaferry	Blue and yellow	Champions	?	26	2026

== Honours ==
The Jeremiah McVeagh Cup is the current prize for winning the championship. It was presented by nationalist Member of Parliament Jeremiah McVeagh to the Down County Board in 1913 and has been presented to the championship winners ever since..

Traditionally, depending on the venue, the victory presentation takes place at a special rostrum in the main grandstand or on a podium on the pitch. The cup is decorated with ribbons in the colours of the winning team. During the game the cup actually has both teams' sets of ribbons attached and the runners-up ribbons are removed before the presentation. The winning captain accepts the cup on behalf of his team before giving a short speech. Individual members of the winning team then have an opportunity to come to the rostrum to lift the cup, which is held by the winning team until the following year's final.

In accordance with GAA rules, the County Board awards a set of gold medals to the championship winners.

The winners of the Down Senior Championship, as well as being presented with the Jeremiah McVeagh Cup, qualify to represent their county in the subsequent Ulster Senior Club Hurling Championship.

== List of finals ==
(r) = replay

(aet) = after extra time

Year	Winners		Runners-up	
Year	Club	Score	Club	Score
1903	Faugh-a-Ballagh			
1904	Faugh-a-Ballagh			
1905	Clann na Boirce			
1906	Clann na Boirce			
1907	Faugh-a-Ballagh			
1908	Faugh-a-Ballagh			
1909	Faugh-a-Ballagh			
1910	Ballyvarley			
1911	No competition			
1912	Kilclief			
1913	Kilclief			
1914	Kilclief			
1915	Kilclief			
1916	Kilclief			
1917	Kilclief			
1918	Kilclief			
1919	Kilclief			
1920	Kilclief			
1921	No competition			
1922	No competition			
1923	No competition			
1924	Kilclief			
1925	Kilclief			
1926	Portaferry			
1927	Liatroim Fontenoys			
1928	Liatroim Fontenoys			
1929	Portaferry			
1930	Faugh-a-Ballagh			
1931	Kilclief			
1932	Kilclief			
1933	Kilclief			
1934	Clann Uladh			
1935	Kilclief			
1936	Ballela			
1937	Ballela			
1938	Portaferry			
1939	Kilclief			
1940	Ballela			
1941	Ballela			
1942	Kilclief			
1943	Kilclief			
1944	Kilclief			
1945	Kilclief			
1946	Clann Uladh			
1947	Kilclief			
1948	Ballela			
1949	Ballycran			
1950				
1951	Ballela			
1952	Ballela			
1953	Ballycran			
1954	Kilclief			
1955	Kilclief			
1956	Kilclief			
1957	Ballycran			
1958	Ballycran			
1959	Ballygalget			
1960	Ballycran			
1961	Ballycran		Portaferry	
1962†		—N/a		—N/a
1963	Portaferry			
1964	Ballygalget			
1965	Portaferry			
1966	Ballygalget			
1967	Ballycran			
1968	Portaferry			
1969	Portaferry			
1970	Ballygalget			
1971	Portaferry			
1972	Ballycran		Portaferry	
1973	Ballygalget		Ballycran	
1974	Ballycran			
1975	Ballygalget			
1976	Ballycran			
1977	Ballycran		Ballygalget	
1978	Portaferry		Ballygalget	
1979	Ballycran			
1980	Ballycran			
1981	Portaferry			
1982	Ballygalget		Ballycran	
1983	Ballygalget	4–08	Ballycran	2–08
1984	Ballycran	2–10	Ballygalget	1–11
1985	Ballycran		Portaferry	
1986	Ballycran	3–06	Portaferry	1–11
1987	Ballycran	0–17	Ballygalget	1–08
1988	Portaferry		Ballycran	
1989	Portaferry	0–14	Ballycran	1–08
1990	Ballygalget	3–13	Ballycran	2–12
1991	Portaferry	0–10	Ballycran	1–05
1992	Ballygalget	0–11	Ballycran	0–10
1993	Ballycran	1–09, 2–17 (r, aet)	Ballygalget	1–09, 2–15 (r, aet)
1994	Ballycran	1–10	Ballygalget	0–12
1995	Ballycran	0–16	Ballygalget	1–07
1996	Portaferry	1–14	Ballygalget	2–05
1997	Ballygalget	2–11	Portaferry	0–09
1998	Ballygalget	0–16	Portaferry	1–10
1999	Ballygalget	0–10, 1–11 (r)	Portaferry	0–10, 0–08 (r)
2000	Portaferry	0–18	Ballygalget	1–08
2001	Portaferry	0–13	Ballycran	1–05
2002	Portaferry	0–14	Ballygalget	3-04
2003	Ballygalget	0–17	Portaferry	1–10
2004	Ballygalget	1–12	Portaferry	1-06
2005	Ballygalget	3–14	Ballycran	0–15
2006	Portaferry	1–15	Ballycran	0–14
2007	Ballycran	1–13	Ballygalget	0-09
2008	Ballygalget	2–13	Portaferry	0-08
2009	Ballycran	1–14	Ballygalget	0–12
2010	Ballygalget	3–19	Ballycran	1–13
2011	Ballycran	1–11	Portaferry	0–13
2012	Portaferry	3-08	Ballycran	0–11
2013	Ballygalget	1–18	Portaferry	1–11
2014	Portaferry	1–12	Ballycran	1–11
2015	Ballycran	1–15	Ballygalget	0–16
2016	Ballygalget	0-06	Ballycran	0-02
2017	Ballygalget	2–13	Portaferry	2–12
2018	Ballycran	2–13	Portaferry	1–14
2019	Ballycran	1–20	Portaferry	1–13
2020	Portaferry	2–18, 0–15 (r)	Ballycran	2–18, 0–13 (r)
2021	Ballycran	2–25 (aet)	Portaferry	3–20 (aet)
2022	Portaferry	1–12	Ballycran	0–13
2023	Portaferry	0–20	Ballycran	0–16
2024	Portaferry	3–21	Ballygalget	2–15
2025	Portaferry	2–24	Ballygalget	2–13
2026	Portaferry	2-28	Ballygalget	2-17

=== Notes ===
† The 1962 final was abandoned.

== Roll of honour ==
#	Club	Titles	Years won
1	Ballycran	27	1949, 1953, 1957, 1958, 1960, 1961, 1967, 1972, 1974, 1976, 1977, 1979, 1980, 1984, 1985, 1986, 1987, 1993, 1994, 1995, 2007, 2009, 2011, 2015, 2018, 2019, 2021
2	Portaferry	26	1926, 1929, 1938, 1963, 1965, 1968, 1969, 1971, 1978, 1981, 1988, 1989, 1991, 1996, 2000, 2001, 2002, 2006, 2012, 2014, 2020, 2022, 2023, 2024, 2025, 2026
3	Kilclief	23	1912, 1913, 1914, 1915, 1916, 1917, 1918, 1919, 1920, 1925, 1931, 1932, 1933, 1935, 1939, 1942, 1943, 1944, 1945, 1947, 1954, 1955, 1956
4	Ballygalget	21	1959, 1964, 1966, 1970, 1973, 1975, 1982, 1983, 1990, 1992, 1997, 1998, 1999, 2003, 2004, 2005, 2008, 2010, 2013, 2016, 2017
5	Ballela	7	1936, 1937, 1940, 1941, 1948, 1951, 1952
6	Faugh-a-Ballagh	6	1903, 1904, 1907, 1908, 1909, 1930
7	Clann na Boirce	2	1905, 1906
7	Liatroim Fontenoys	2	1927, 1928
7	Clann Uladh	2	1934, 1946
10	Ballyvarley	1	1910

== Records and statistics ==
=== Final ===
==== Team ====
- Most wins: 27:
  - Ballycran: (1949, 1953, 1957, 1958, 1960, 1961, 1967, 1972, 1974, 1976, 1977, 1979, 1980, 1984, 1985, 1986, 1987, 1993, 1994, 1995, 2007, 2009, 2011, 2015, 2018, 2019, 2021.
- Most consecutive wins: 9:
  - Kilclief: (1912, 1913, 1914, 1915, 1916, 1917, 1918, 1919, 1920)

=== Teams ===
==== By decade ====
The most successful team of each decade, judged by number of Down Senior Hurling Championship titles, is as follows:

- 1900s: 5 for Faugh-a-Ballagh (1903-04-07-08-09)
- 1910s: 8 for Kilclief (1912-13-14-15-16-17-18-19)
- 1920s: 2 each for Kilclief (1920-25), Portaferry (1926-29) and Liatroim Fontenoys (1927–28)
- 1930s: 5 for Kilclief (1931-32-33-35-39)
- 1940s: 5 for Kilclief (1942-43-44-45-47)
- 1950s: 3 for Ballycran (1953-57-58) and Kilclief (1954-55-56)
- 1960s: 4 for Portaferry (1963-65-68-69)
- 1970s: 5 for Ballycran (1972-74-76-77-79)
- 1980s: 5 for Ballycran (1980-84-85-86-87)
- 1990s: 5 for Ballygalget (1990-92-97-98-99)
- 2000s: 4 each for Portaferry (2000-01-02-06) and Ballygalget (2003-04-05-08)
- 2010s: 4 each for Ballygalget (2010-13-16-17) and Ballycran (2011-15-18-19)
- 2020s: 6 for Portaferry (2020-22-23-24-25-26)

==== Gaps ====
Longest gaps between successive championship titles:

- 25 years: Portaferry (1938–1963)
- 21 years: Faugh-a-Ballagh (1909–1930)
- 12 years: Clann Uladh (1934–1946)

== See also ==
- Down Intermediate Hurling Championship (Tier 2)
