= Liatroim Fontenoys GAC =

- Fontanoigheannaí Liatroma CLG
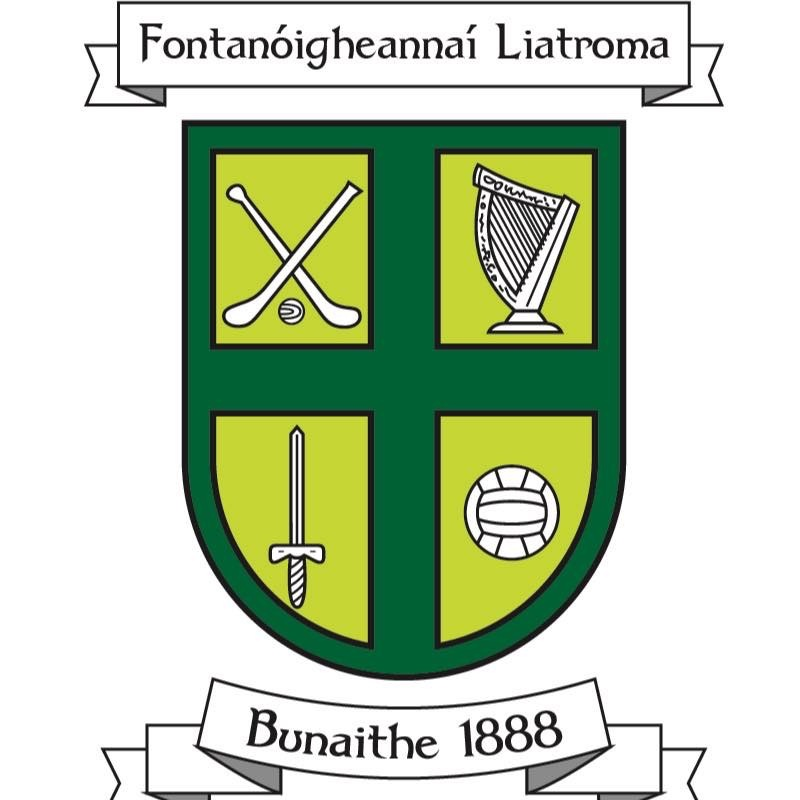
- Founded: 1888
- County: Down
- Nickname: The Fontenoys
- Colours: Green White Yellow
- Grounds: Fontenoy Park, Leitrim, County Down
- Coordinates: 54.2858°N 5.9952°W

Playing kits
Standard colours

Senior Club Championships
	All Ireland	Ulster champions	Down champions
Football:	-	-	3
Hurling:	-	-	2
Camogie:	-	5	28

Liatroim Fontenoys is a Gaelic Athletic Association Club in County Down, Northern Ireland. The club promotes hurling, Gaelic football, and camogie.

== History ==
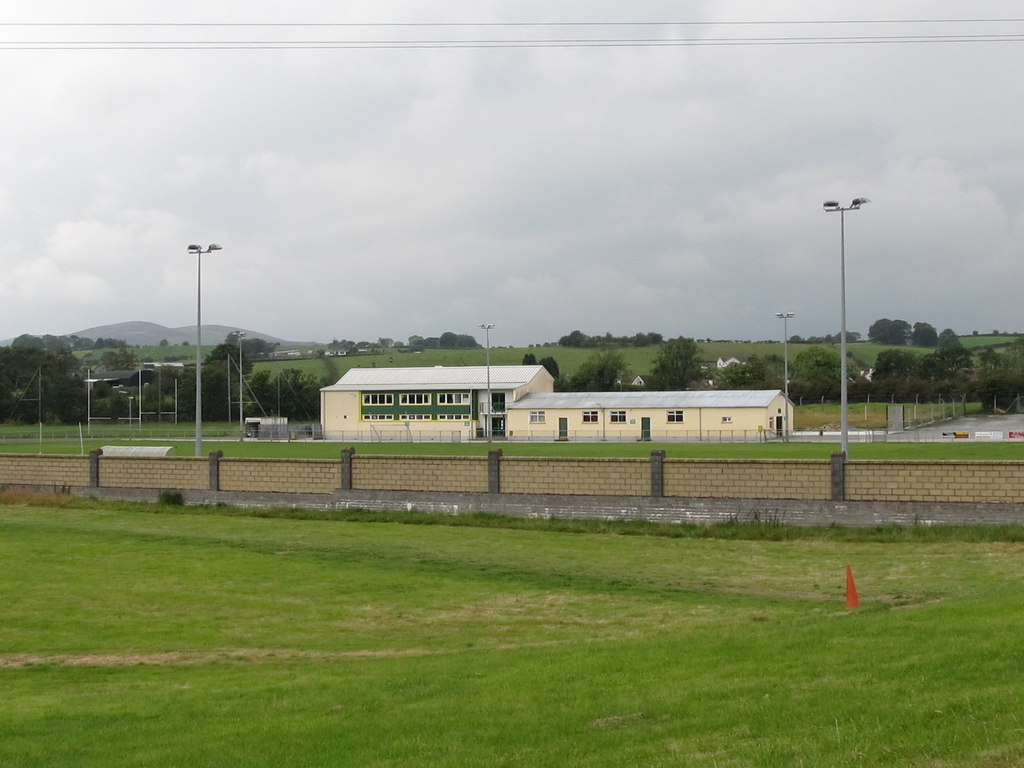
The Liatroim Fontenoys GAC club building in Leitrim Village

Liatroim Fontenoys, a small rural club in County Down, based in the village of Leitrim, was founded in February 1888 by and was the first GAA club established in that county. The McAleenan brothers from nearby Ballymaginaghy were working in Dublin during 1887. While there, they met Maurice Davin and Michael Cusack, early pioneers of the Gaelic Athletic Association (GAA). Around this time J.L. Savage, a native of nearby Backaderry, learned about Gaelic games. In 1888, Savage and the McAleenans founded Liatroim Fontenoys GAC, named for the Battle of Fontenoy (1745) in which an Irish Brigade helped the French to a victory over the British (part of the War of the Austrian Succession).

By 1905 the club won their first county football championship and were undefeated in the league. In 1921, the Fontenoys became the only Down club to win Senior County Championships in both hurling and football; a feat still unmatched.

During the years that followed the club competed in both codes without any major success. In the 1940s and 1950s, a number of club members were selected to represent Ulster (in Railway Cup competitions) Down (in All-Ireland contests). For example, Colm McAlarney played in midfield and Willie Doyle at centre halfback for the Down team that defeated Kerry in the 1968 All-Ireland Senior Football Championship final.

During the 1950s, a camogie team was established. However, within a few years numbers had fallen and so the game was phased out. By 1972 interest in camogie was revived and training sessions arranged. Within two years, two players - Sheila McCartan and Bernie Malone - had collected All-Ireland Minor Championships medals with Down, and in 1976 Bernie Brown played for Down to collect a Junior Championship All-Ireland medal. Within five years from its formation the Fontenoy camogs had advanced to senior status and in 1977 collected the County League and Championship double. In 1984 Liatroim's under 14 camogs won the Division 3 title Feile nGael All-Ireland in Wexford. Later that year in September, Liatroim senior camogie team won their first Ulster Club Championship title.

In 1991, Down won the All-Ireland Junior Championship in camogie with nine Liatroim players on the panel. In 1995, the senior camogie team collected their second Ulster Championship title when they outplayed Lavey. Their captain was Bernie Kelly, and the following year they retained that title by defeating Dunloy. On this occasion their captain was Maureen O’Higgins. Later that year Máirín McAleenan, who became the first Down camogie player to be honoured by the Ulster Writers who selected her Player of the Year. In 1998, the senior team regained the Ulster Club Championship by defeating Dunloy. Down won the All-Ireland league title in May 1998 and added the All-Ireland Intermediate Championship Title in September. The senior camogie team retained their Ulster Club Championship Title in 1999. In 2001, the senior camogie team collected their twelfth successive Championship and twentieth successive Senior League title.

== Hurling ==
The club's hurlers won the Down Intermediate championship in 1998 and in 2001. In October 2006, the club won another Intermediate title at the expense of Ballycran IIs. On 23 October 2006, they defeated Armagh in the Ulster Intermediate Club hurling Semi-final in Casement Park. Their opponents in the Ulster final on 5 November at St Tiernach's Park, Clones, were Antrim's representatives, Gort na Móna.

On 3 December 2022 Leitrim became the first club in County Down to win the Ulster intermediate hurling championship, beating Middletown 2–20 to 0–20.

== Camogie ==
The Liatroim Camógs have been represented on Down teams at all levels on several occasions. In 2004, Cumann Camógaíochta na nGael celebrated its centenary, and a Liatroim Fontenoys player was subsequently selected as Centenary Ambassador for Down and Ulster. Later that year, down reached the All-Ireland Junior championship final with five Fontenoys on the panel. Cork defeated Down by five points.

Liatroim were aiming for club success, and when they defeated Kilnamona of Clare in the All-Ireland Junior Club semi-final in October 2004, the scene was set for a bid for national honours in Parnell Park on 7 November, with Four Roads of Roscommon the opposition. The Fontenoys won.

=== Honours ===
All-Ireland Junior Club Camogie Championship: 2

- 2004, 2005

Ulster Senior Club Camogie Championship: 5

- 1984, 1995, 1996, 1998, 1999

Ulster Intermediate Club Camogie Championship: 1

- 2013

Ulster Junior Club Camogie Championship: 2

- 2004, 2005

Down Senior Camogie Championship: 28

- 1977, 1984, 1990, 1991, 1992, 1993, 1994, 1995, 1996, 1997, 1998, 1999, 2000, 2001, 2004, 2005, 2013, 2023, not all years included

== See also ==
- Down Senior Club Football Championship
- List of Gaelic Athletic Association clubs
