= Bredagh GAC =

- CLG Bréadach
- Founded: 1973
- County: Down
- Nickname: The Boyds
- Colours: Maroon and White
- Grounds: Cherryvale Playing Fields
- Coordinates: 54°34′21.84″N 5°54′37.21″W

Playing kits
Standard colours

Bredagh GAC is a Gaelic Athletic Association club in County Down, Northern Ireland. It fields teams at all levels from U8 to Senior in Men's and Ladies Gaelic football, Hurling and Camogie. It had its previous pitch, Bredagh Park, taken off them in December 1998 but moved next door to Cherryvale Playing Fields, owned by the Belfast City Council.

Bredagh is one of the few clubs in Down without a pitch to call its own but it benefits from both a changing demographic in the Ballynafeigh area and from increased training at underage levels.

In 2006, the footballers won the Down Junior Football Championship and the Hurlers won Division 3 of the Ulster Club Hurling League.

In 2007 the hurlers won the Down Junior Hurling Championship and Division 2 of the All County Hurling League - both for the first time.

In 2008 they won Antrim League Division 4B. At underage level they won the Division 1 (14s) and Division 2 (16s)Down Hurling Championship at U14 and U16. The U14 Hurling team also won Division 1of the county league and the Division 1 Down Feile. They were also narrowly beaten in the final of the Division 2 All-Ireland Feile in County Clare.

In 2010 the hurlers won the Down Intermediate Hurling Championship for the first time along with Antrim League Division 4A.

In 2011 Bredagh Won The Down Junior Football Championship Beating Dromara 4.10 To 0.09 in the final.

2011 also saw Bredagh Senior Hurlers compete in the Down Senior Hurling Championship for the first time in the history of the club.

In 2012 Bredagh Senior Hurlers won the Down Junior Hurling Championship for the second time after re-structuring from the Down County Board saw them drop from Senior Championship to Junior.

The Senior Hurlers made history in October 2012 when they won the Ulster Junior Club Hurling Championship for the first time in the club's history beating Na Magha of Derry 4–18 to 3–07 at Casement Park.

The Senior Men's Footballers gained promotion to Down Division 2 in 2012.

2016 saw the Men's Footballers and men's hurlers both win their respective Intermediate Championships. The footballers achieved victory over An Riocht in Pairc Esler and the hurlers achieving victory over Ballycran in Newcastle. Also in 2016, the ladies footballers went on to win the Senior Championship wrh a victory over Castlewellen in Downpatrick.

2017 saw the men's footballers win the Down Intermediate Football Championship.

== See also ==
- List of Gaelic Athletic Association clubs
- An Riocht
- Castlewellan GAC
- Clonduff GAC
- Kilcoo GAC
- Longstone GAC
- John Mitchel GFC
- Newry Bosco GFC
- Warrenpoint GAA
