= Ulster Senior Club Hurling Championship =

Annual hurling competition

- Current season or competition: 2026 Ulster Senior Club Hurling Championship
- Irish: Craobh Iománaíochta Sinsir Ulaidh na gClub
- Code: Hurling
- Founded: 1970; 56 years ago
- Region: Ulster (GAA)
- Trophy: Four Seasons Cup
- No. of teams: 3
- Title holders: Slaughtneil (6th title)
- Most titles: Ruairí Óg Cushendall (12 titles)
- Sponsors: Allied Irish Banks
- TV partner: TG4
- Motto: The toughest of them all
- Official website: Ulster GAA

The Ulster Senior Club Hurling Championship (known for sponsorship reasons as the AIB Ulster GAA Hurling Senior Club Championship, abbreviated as the Ulster Club SHC) is an annual hurling competition organised by the Ulster Council of the Gaelic Athletic Association and contested by the champion hurling teams in the province of Ulster in Ireland. It is the most prestigious club competition in Ulster hurling.

Introduced in 1970, it was initially a straight knockout tournament open to the nine county club champion teams in Ulster. The competition currently retains the knockout format but features just four teams who represent the strongest hurling counties in Ulster.

In its current format, the Ulster Club Championship begins in October with the semi-finals. Entrants are not seeded. The two semi-final winners proceed to the final which is currently played in late October or early November. The winner of the Ulster Club Championship, as well as being presented with the Four Seasons Cup, qualifies for the subsequent All-Ireland Club Championship.

The competition has been won by 10 teams, 8 of which have won it more than once. Ruairí Óg, Cushendall is the most successful team in the tournament's history, having won it 12 times. Slaughtneil are the reigning champions, having beaten St John's by 0-23 to 0-10 in the final.

== Teams ==
=== Qualification ===
County	Championship	Qualifying team
Antrim	Antrim Senior Hurling Championship	Champions
Derry	Derry Senior Hurling Championship	Champions
Donegal	Donegal Senior Hurling Championship	Champions
Down	Down Senior Hurling Championship	Champions

=== 2025 teams ===
28 clubs will compete in the 2025 Ulster Senior Club Hurling Championship:

County	No.	Clubs competing in county championship
Antrim	8	Cúchulainns, Dunloy, Loughgiel Shamrocks, McQuillan Ballycastle, O'Donovan Rossa, Ruairí Óg, St Enda's, **St John's**
Derry	8	Ballinascreen, Banagher, Eoghan Rua, Kevin Lynch's, Lavey, Na Magha, **Slaughtneil**, Swatragh
Donegal	6	Buncrana, Burt, Carndonagh, Seán MacCumhaills, **Setanta**, St Eunan's
Down	6	Ballycran, Ballygalget, Bredagh, Carryduff, Liatroim Fontenoys, **Portaferry**

Note: Bold indicates county representative.

== List of finals ==
=== Legend ===
- The winners are listed in **bold** if they also won the All-Ireland Senior Club Hurling Championship.

=== List of Ulster SHC finals ===
Year	Winners			Runners-up		
Year	County	Club	Score	County	Club	Score
2025	DER	Slaughtneil	0-23	ANT	St. John's	0-10
2024	DER	Slaughtneil	2-19	DOW	Portaferry	1-19
2023	ANT	Cushendall	0-20	DER	Slaughtneil	2-10
2022	ANT	Dunloy	2-12	DER	Slaughtneil	0-16
2021	DER	Slaughtneil	1-14	DOW	Ballycran	0-10
2020	Cancelled due to the impact of the COVID-19 pandemic on Gaelic games					
2019	DER	Slaughtneil	1-15	ANT	Dunloy	0-10
2018	ANT	Cushendall	1-15	DOW	Ballycran	0-10
2017	DER	Slaughtneil	2-21	DOW	Ballygalget	1-12
2016	DER	Slaughtneil	2-14	ANT	Loughgiel Shamrocks	1-13
2015	ANT	Cushendall	1-24 (aet)	DER	Slaughtneil	3-17 (aet)
2014	DOW	Portaferry	1-16	ANT	Cushendall	0-10
2013/14	ANT	Loughgiel Shamrocks	3-14	DER	Slaughtneil	1-15
2012/13	ANT	Loughgiel Shamrocks	2-25	DOW	Portaferry	0-12
2011/12	ANT	**Loughgiel Shamrocks**	2-18	DOW	Ballycran	0-08
2010/11	ANT	Loughgiel Shamrocks	2-24	ARM	Keady Lamh Dhearg	0-06
2009/10	ANT	Dunloy	2-16	DOW	Ballycran	2-11
2008/09	ANT	Cushendall	1-14	DOW	Ballygalget	1-13
2007/08	ANT	Dunloy	2-14	DER	Kevin Lynch's	2-08
2006/07	ANT	Cushendall	1-13; 1-15 (R)	DER	Kevin Lynch's	2-10; 1-07 (R)
2005/06	DOW	Ballygalget	1-18	ANT	Cushendall	3-08
2004/05	ANT	O'Donovan Rossa	0-16	DOW	Ballygalget	0-14
2003/04	ANT	Dunloy	3-19	DER	Kevin Lynch's	0-09
2002/03	ANT	Dunloy	0-12	DOW	Portaferry	1-06
2001/02	ANT	Dunloy	3-11	DER	Lavey	1-07
2000/01	ANT	Dunloy	4-11	DER	Slaughtneil	0-09
1999/00	ANT	Cushendall	1-12	DOW	Ballygalget	1-8
1998–99	DOW	Ballygalget	1-13; 1-14 (R)	ANT	McQuillan Ballycastle	3-07; 1-12 (R)
1997–98	ANT	Dunloy	3-16	DER	Lavey	4-10
1996–97	ANT	Cushendall		DOW	Portaferry	
1995–96	ANT	Dunloy	2-18	DOW	Ballycran	0-09
1994–95	ANT	Dunloy	3-09	DER	Lavey	1-12
1993–94	DOW	Ballycran	2-10	ANT	Cushendall	0-12
1992–93	ANT	Cushendall	2-12	DOW	Ballygalget	1-10
1991–92	ANT	Cushendall	1-16	DOW	Portaferry	0-05
1990–91	ANT	Dunloy	0-17	DOW	Ballygalget	2-04
1989–90	ANT	Loughgiel Shamrocks	1-14	DOW	Portaferry	2-09
1988–89	ANT	O'Donovan Rossa	0-13	DER	Lavey	0-11
1987–88	ANT	Cushendall	3-10	DOW	Ballycran	1-06
1986–87	ANT	McQuillan Ballycastle	1-13	DER	Lavey	1-08
1985–86	ANT	Cushendall	0-19	DOW	Ballycran	0-10
1984–85	ANT	McQuillan Ballycastle	1-14	DOW	Ballycran	1-03
1983–84	ANT	McQuillan Ballycastle	4-12	DOW	Ballygalget	2-03
1982–83	ANT	**Loughgiel Shamrocks**	1-09	DOW	Ballygalget	0-09
1981–82	ANT	Cushendall	4-17	DOW	Portaferry	0-09
1980–81	ANT	McQuillan Ballycastle	1-20	DOW	Ballycran	0-13
1979–80	ANT	McQuillan Ballycastle	0-11	DOW	Ballycran	0-08
1978–79	ANT	McQuillan Ballycastle	2-14	DOW	Portaferry	2-07
1977–78	ANT	O'Donovan Rossa	1-13	DOW	Ballycran	2-06
1976–77	DOW	Ballycran	0-08	ANT	O'Donovan Rossa	0-07
1975–76	DOW	Ballygalget	4-06	ANT	McQuillan Ballycastle	1-09
1974–75	DOW	Ballycran	3-05	ANT	Patrick Sarsfields	3-02
1973–74	ANT	St. John's	w/o	DER	Kevin Lynch's	scr.
1972–73	ANT	O'Donovan Rossa	2-08	DOW	Ballycran	3-02
1971–72	ANT	Loughgiel Shamrocks	3-08	DOW	Portaferry	1-12
1970–71	ANT	Loughgiel Shamrocks	6-14	DOW	Ballygalget	2-05

== Roll of honour ==
=== By county ===
County	Titles	Runners-up	Total
Antrim	42	10	52
Down	7	30	37
Derry	6	14	20
Armagh	0	1	1

=== By club ===
Club	County	Titles	Championships won
Ruairí Óg	Antrim	12	1981, 1985, 1987, 1991, 1992, 1996, 1999, 2006, 2008, 2015, 2018, 2023
Dunloy	Antrim	11	1990, 1994, 1995, 1997, 2000, 2001, 2002, 2003, 2007, 2009, 2022
Loughgiel Shamrocks	Antrim	8	1970, 1971, 1982, 1989, 2010, 2011, 2012, 2013
McQuillan Ballycastle	Antrim	6	1978, 1979, 1980, 1983, 1984, 1986
Slaughtneil	Derry	6	2016, 2017, 2019, 2021, 2024, 2025
O'Donovan Rossa	Antrim	4	1972, 1977, 1988, 2004
Ballycran	Down	3	1974, 1976, 1993
Ballygalget	Down	3	1975, 1998, 2005
St John's	Antrim	1	1973
Portaferry	Down	1	2014

== Records and statistics ==
=== County representatives and provincial champions by year ===
Provincial winners are shaded in gold.

Year	Antrim	Armagh	Derry	Down	Fermanagh	Donegal
2025	St John's	N / A	Slaughtneil	Portaferry	N / A	Setanta
2024	Ruairí Óg	N / A	Slaughtneil	Portaferry	N / A	N / A
2023	Ruairí Óg	N / A	Slaughtneil	Portaferry	N / A	N / A
2022	Dunloy	N / A	Slaughtneil	Portaferry	N / A	N / A
2021	Dunloy	N / A	Slaughtneil	Ballycran	N / A	N / A
2020	No championship					
2019	Dunloy	Middletown	Slaughtneil	Ballycran	N / A	N / A
2018	Ruairí Óg	N / A	Slaughtneil	Ballycran	N / A	N / A
2017	Dunloy	N / A	Slaughtneil	Ballygalget	Lisbellaw St Patrick's	N / A
2016	Loughgiel Shamrocks	Middletown	Slaughtneil	Ballygalget	Lisbellaw St Patrick's	N / A
2015	Ruairí Óg	Middletown	Slaughtneil	Ballycran	Lisbellaw St Patrick's	N / A
2014	Ruairí Óg	N / A	Slaughtneil	Portaferry	Lisbellaw St Patrick's	N / A

=== Teams ===
==== By decade ====
The most successful team of each decade, judged by number of Ulster Championship titles, is as follows:

- 1970s: 2 each for Loughgiel Shamrocks (1970–71), O'Donovan Rossa (1972–77), Ballycran (1974–76), Ballycastle McQuillan (1978–79)
- 1980s: 4 for Ballycastle McQuillan (1980-83-84-86)
- 1990s: 4 each for Dunloy (1990-94-95-97) and Ruairí Óg (1991-92-96-99)
- 2000s: 6 for Dunloy (2000-01-02-03-07-09)
- 2010s: 4 for Loughgiel Shamrocks (2010-11-12-13)

==== Gaps ====
Top five longest gaps between successive championship titles:

- 23 years: Ballygalget (1975-1998)
- 21 years: Loughgiel Shamrocks (1989-2010)
- 17 years: Ballycran (1976-1993)
- 16 years: O'Donovan Rossa (1988-2004)
- 11 years: O'Donovan Rossa (1977-1988)

=== Top scorers ===
==== By year ====
Year	Top scorer	Team	Score	Total
2006	Geoffrey McGonagle	Kevin Lynch's	4-07	19
2007	Gregory O'Kane	Dunloy	0-21	21
2008	Martin Óg Coulter	Ballygalget	2-11	17
2009	Simon Wilson	Ballycran	1-14	17
2010	Liam Watson	Loughgiel Shamrocks	1-13	16
2011	Liam Watson	Loughgiel Shamrocks	1-07	10
2012	Paul Braniff	Portaferry	0-18	18
2013	Liam Watson	Loughgiel Shamrocks	0-13	13
2014	Neil McManus	Ruairí Óg	1-19	22
2015	Cormac O'Doherty	Slaughtneil	1-16	19
2016	Cormac O'Doherty	Slaughtneil	1-16	19
2017	Cormac O'Doherty	Slaughtneil	1-21	24
2018	Scott Nicholason	Ballycran	0-09	9
2018	Neil McManus	Ruairí Óg	0-09	9
2018	Colum McManus	Ballycran	0-09	9
2019	Cormac O'Doherty	Slaughtneil	1-15	18

==== In finals ====
Final	Top scorer	Team	Score	Total
1999	Jackie Carson	Ruairí Óg, Cushendall	1-04	7
2000	Séamus McMullan	Dunloy	1-03	6
2001	Paddy Richmond	Dunloy	2-03	9
2002	Gregory O'Kane	Dunloy	0-07	7
2003	Geoffrey McGonigle	Kevin Lynch's	0-08	8
2004	Johnny McGrattan	Ballygalget	0-07	7
2005	Johnny McGrattan	Ballygalget	1-08	11
2006	Geoffrey McGonigle	Kevin Lynch's	2-04	10
2007	Gregory O'Kane	Dunloy	0-07	7
2008	Martin Óg Coulter	Ballygalget	0-10	10
2009	Simon Wilson	Ballycran	1-06	9
2010	Eddie McCloskey	Loughgiel Shamrocks	0-07	7
2011	Eddie McCloskey	Loughgiel Shamrocks	1-02	5
2012	Liam Watson	Loughgiel Shamrocks	1-05	8
2012	Eddie McCloskey	Loughgiel Shamrocks	0-08	8
2013	Eddie McCloskey	Loughgiel Shamrocks	2-02	8
2014	Eoghan Sands	Portaferry	1-03	6
2014	Paul Braniff	Portaferry	0-06	6
2015	Neil McManus	Ruairí Óg, Cushendall	0-13	13
2016	Cormac O'Doherty	Slaughtneil	1-08	11
2017	Cormac O'Doherty	Slaughtneil	1-10	13
2018	Neil McManus	Ruairí Óg, Cushendall	0-09	9
2019	Cormac O'Doherty	Slaughtneil	1-04	18
2019	Conall Cunning	Dunloy	0-07	18

== See also ==
- Ulster Intermediate Club Hurling Championship
- Ulster Junior Club Hurling Championship
