= Ballycran =

GAA club in County Down

St Joseph's GAA Club, Ballycran
- CLG Naomh Iósaf, Baile Crann
- Founded: 1939
- County: Down
- Nickname: The Crans
- Colours
- Grounds: McKenna Park
- Coordinates: 54°28′38.99″N 5°30′26.94″W

Playing kits
Home Kit	Change Kit

Senior Club Championships
	All Ireland	Ulster champions	Down champions
Hurling:	0	3	27
Camogie:	-	-	5

St Joseph's GAA Club, Ballycran, referred to mononymously as Ballycran, is a Gaelic Athletic Association club in the Ards Peninsula, County Down, Northern Ireland. The club is affiliated to the Down County Board and fields teams in both hurling and camogie.

== History ==
Located at the parish of Ardkeen, about 25 miles from Belfast, St Joseph's GAA Club, Ballycran was founded in 1939 to provide hurling for the local boys and men of the parish. Hugh Gilmore, Pat Hamilton and Frank McKenna were the driving forces of the new club in its early days. The club colours of black and amber were chosen in tribute to McKenna's long-time friend – Lory Meagher of Kilkenny.

Ballycran had its first major success in 1949, when the club claimed their inaugural Down SHC title. The club went on to be regular winners of the Down SHC title in the decades that followed. Ballycran also became the first Down club to win the Ulster Club SHC title in 1974. Further provincial titles were won in 1976 and 1993.

The club won its 24th Down SHC title in 2015 to overtake Kilclief and move into first place on the all-time roll of honour. Kilclief's record had stood since 1956. Ballycran won its 27th Down SHC title in 2021, after a 2–25 to 3–20 extra-time win over Portaferry.

== Grounds ==
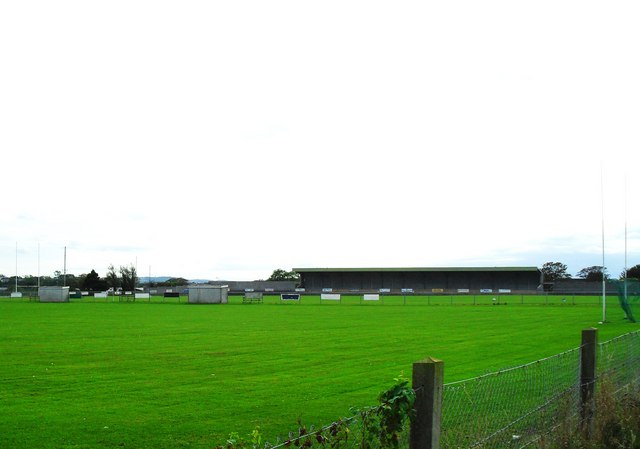
McKenna Park in 2009

Ballycran's home ground is McKenna Park. It is named in honour of founder-member Frank McKenna. The official opening took place on 26 June 1966. It is frequently used as a venue for games involving the Down senior hurling team.

== Honours ==
- Ulster Senior Club Hurling Championship (3): 1974, 1976, 1993
- Down Senior Hurling Championship (27): 1949, 1953, 1957, 1958, 1960, 1961, 1967, 1972, 1974, 1976, 1977, 1979, 1980, 1984, 1985, 1986, 1987, 1993, 1994, 1995, 2007, 2009, 2011, 2015, 2018, 2019, 2021
- Ulster Intermediate Club Camogie Championship (1): 2012
- Down Senior Camogie Championship (5): 1967, 1969, 2008, 2011, 2012

== Notable players ==
- Greg Blaney: All-Ireland SFC-winner (1991, 1994)
- Gary Savage: Ulster SHC-winner (1992, 1995, 1997)
