= Portaferry GAC =

Gaelic games club in County Down, Northern Ireland

Portaferry
- Port an Pheire
- Founded: 1912
- County: Down
- Colours
- Grounds: St Patrick's Park
- Coordinates: 54°22′28″N 5°31′48″W

Playing kits
Home Kit	Change Kit

Senior Club Championships
	All Ireland	Ulster champions	Down champions
Hurling:	0	1	26

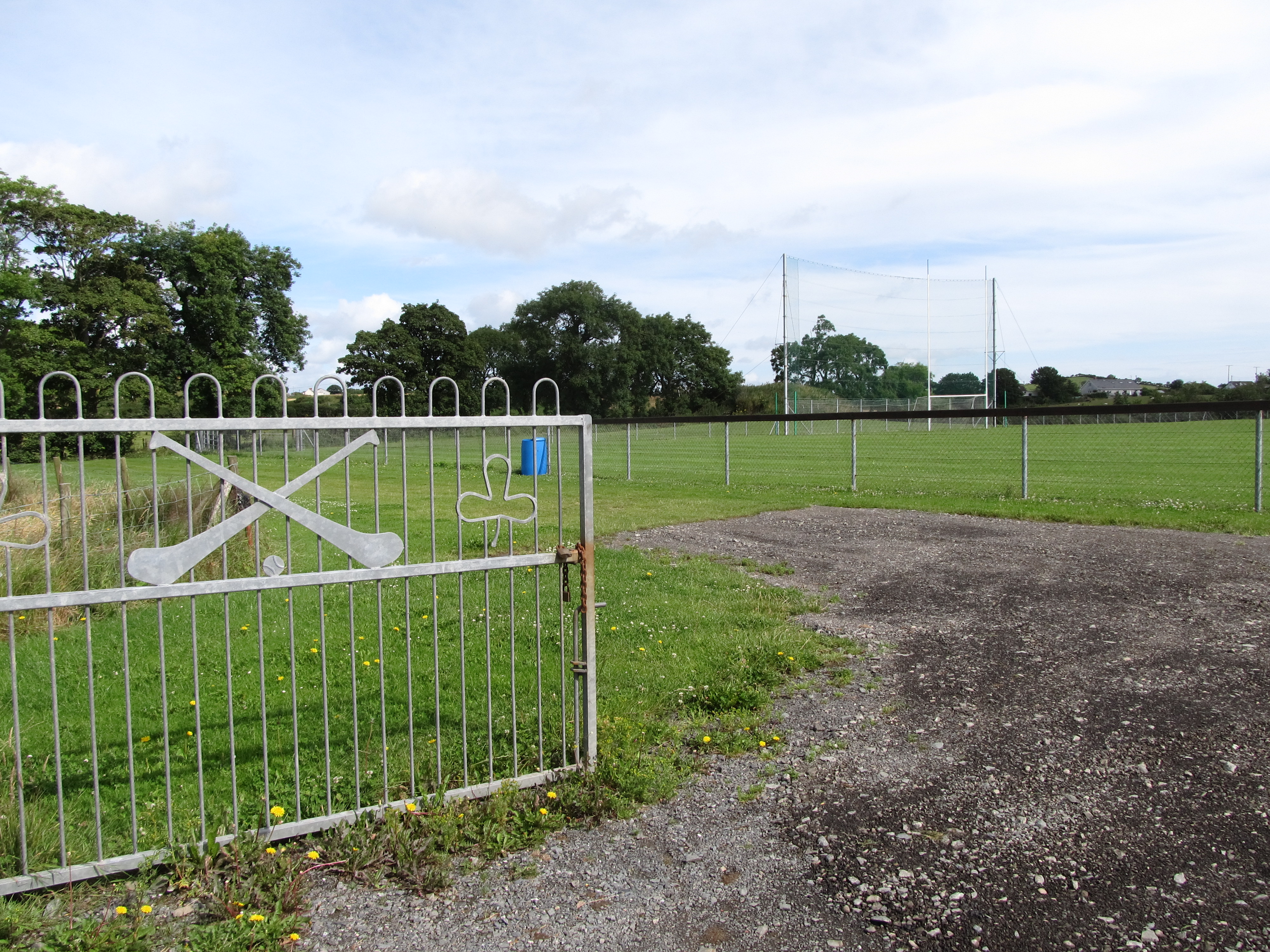
The club grounds, St Patricks Park on the Ballyfounder Road.

Portaferry GAC is a Gaelic Athletic Association club in Portaferry, County Down, Northern Ireland. The club is affiliated to the Down County Board and is exclusively concerned with the game of hurling.

== History ==
Located at the southern end of the Ards Peninsula, about 30 miles from Belfast, Portaferry Gaelic Athletic Club was founded in 1912, however, hurling had been played on the peninsula as early as 1900 by Portaferry Carraig Uladh. One of the early driving forces behind the new club was a Tipperary-man named Ned Purcell. He was an agricultural inspector who introduced hurling to the area. The club colours of blue and yellow were adopted in honour of his home county.

Portaferry had its first major success in 1926, when the club claimed their inaugural Down SHC title. Further titles were won in 1929 and 1938, however, World War II resulted in a travel restrictions and a curtailment of activities. The club was reformed as St Patrick's Portaferry in 1948. After a lapse of 25 years, the club claimed its fourth Down SHC in 1963. It was one of four such titles won that decade.

Portaferry went on to be regular winners of the Down SHC title in the decades that followed, as well as claiming the Ulster Club SHC title in 2014. The club won its 22nd Down SHC title in 2022 to overtake Ballygalget and move into third place on the all-time roll of honour. Portaferry moved into second place in 2024 after winning its 24th title. This was followed by a fourth consecutive Down SHC title in 2025.

== Honours ==
- Ulster Senior Club Hurling Championship (1): 2014
- Down Senior Hurling Championship (26): 1926, 1929, 1938, 1963, 1965, 1968, 1969, 1971, 1978, 1981, 1988, 1989, 1991, 1996, 2000, 2001, 2002, 2006, 2012, 2014, 2020, 2022, 2023, 2024, 2025, 2026

== Notable players ==
- Paul Braniff, Christy Ring Cup-winner (2013)
- Ciara Mageean, Olympian who played camogie with the club as a child
- Gerard McGrattan, All-Star Award-winner (1992)
