= Ballygalget GAA =

Hurling club in County Down, Northern Ireland

- Baile Mhic Uileagóid CLG
- Founded: 1939
- County: Down
- Nickname: Galget
- Colours
- Grounds: Mitchel Park

Playing kits
Home Kit	Change Kit

Senior Club Championships
	All Ireland	Ulster champions	Down champions
Hurling:	0	3	21

Ballygalget GAA is a Gaelic Athletic Association club in the Ards Peninsula, County Down, Northern Ireland. The club is affiliated to the Down County Board and is exclusively concerned with the game of hurling.

== History ==
Located in the Ards Peninsula, about 27 miles from Belfast, Ballygalget GAA Club was founded on 14 June 1939. Originally named Newcastle John Mitchels, in honour of Irish nationalist John Mitchel, the new club affiliated as a branch of Carraig Uladh and, up to 1945, competed mostly in the locally orgnaised league competition. The club name was changed to Ballygalget John Mitchels in 1942.

Ballygalget had its first major success in 1959, when the club claimed their inaugural Down SHC title. The club went on to be regular winners of the Down SHC title in the decades that followed, as well as claiming their first Ulster Club SHC title in 1975. Further provincial titles were won in 1998 and 2005.

The club won its 21st Down SHC title in 2017 to overtake Portaferry and move into third place on the all-time roll of honour. Since then, Ballygalget have been beaten in two finals and, as of 2025, are in fourth place on the Down SHC toll of honour.

== Honours ==
- Ulster Senior Club Hurling Championship (3): 1975, 1998, 2005
- Down Senior Hurling Championship (21): 1959, 1964, 1966, 1970, 1973, 1975, 1982, 1983, 1990, 1992, 1997, 1998, 1999, 2003, 2004, 2005, 2008, 2010, 2013, 2016, 2017

== Noted hurlers ==
- Martin Bailie: All-Star Replacement 1988, Ulster SHC-winner (1992, 1995, 1997)
- Gareth Johnson: Christy Ring Cup-winner (2013)
- Johnny McGrattan: Ulster SHC-winner (1997)
