= Down GAA =

Gaelic games governing body

- Irish: An Dún
- Nickname(s): The Mournemen (F); The Ardsmen (H)
- Province: Ulster
- Dominant sport: Gaelic football
- Ground(s): Páirc Esler, Newry; McKenna Park, Ballycran
- County colours: Red Black

County teams
- NFL: Division 2
- NHL: Division 2 A
- Football Championship: Tailteann Cup
- Hurling Championship: Joe McDonagh Cup
- Ladies' Gaelic football: Brendan Martin Cup
- Camogie: Kay Mills Cup

The Down County Board (Irish: Cumann Lúthchleas Gael Coiste Chontae An Dún) or Down GAA is one of the 32 county boards of the Gaelic Athletic Association (GAA) in Ireland, and is responsible for the administration of Gaelic games in County Down.

The County Board is responsible for preparing the Down county teams in the various Gaelic sporting codes; football, hurling, camogie and handball.

The county football team was the second from the province of Ulster to win an All-Ireland Senior Football Championship (SFC), following Cavan, and also the first team from the North to win the Sam Maguire Cup since partition, doing so in 1960. The team won the cup again in 1961 and in 1968; this feat was not matched by another team until Down next won the All-Ireland SFC in its 1991 victory. Down and Cavan share the Ulster record for most All-Ireland SFC victories (five). As such, Down is regarded historically as a strong footballing county, and football is widely regarded as the dominant Gaelic sport within the county.

The Ards Peninsula, however, is a hurling stronghold within the county, and – while it is not among the very strongest on the island – the county hurling team competes in the second-tier Joe McDonagh Cup. The "Ardsmen" (as opposed to the nickname of the football team, the "Mourne Men") have won a number of Ulster Senior (SHC) and Minor Hurling Championship (MHC) titles, despite the historical provincial dominance in that sport of Antrim. Down won the 2013 Christy Ring Cup – its first –, in what was then a competition ranked directly beneath the All-Ireland SHC. This entitled Down to enter the 2014 All-Ireland SHC; however, the team opted not to do so. Down continued to participate in the Christy Ring Cup when that competition was pushed into third place by the creation of the Joe McDonagh Cup. Down then won the 2021 Christy Ring Cup, and – with it – promotion to the Joe McDonagh Cup and eligibility for the All-Ireland SHC. As the premier hurling county in Ulster, Antrim, does not have a major footballing tradition, Down is the only genuinely dual county in Ulster that regularly plays some part in both the All-Ireland Senior Football and Senior Hurling Championships.

== Governance ==
Maurice Hayes, the county hurler, became Secretary of the Down County Board in the mid-1950s and set a ten-year plan for the county football team to become the first team from north of the border to win an All-Ireland SFC.

== Clubs ==
The minutes of the Central Council of the GAA record that on 30 April 1888 an application for affiliation was received from St Patrick's, Mayobridge, County Down. The acceptance of the application makes this the oldest registered GAA club in the county.

- Aghaderg–Ballyvarley – Website
- Annaclone
- An Riocht
- Aughlisnafin – Website
- Ardglass
- Atticall – Website
- Ballela
- Ballycran GAC
- Ballygalget GAC
- Ballyholland Harps – Website
- Ballykinlar – Website
- Ballymartin – Website
- Bredagh GAC
- Bright GFC
- Bryansford – Website
- Burren
- Carryduff
- Castlewellan GAC
- Clann na Banna – Website
- Clonduff GAC
- Darragh Cross – Website
- Russell Gaelic Union, Downpatrick
- Dromara – Website
- Drumaness – Website
- Drumgath
- Dundrum – Website
- East Belfast GAA
- Glasdrumman – Website
- Glenn – Website
- Kilclief Ben Dhreag – Website
- Kilcoo GAC
- Liatroim Fontenoys GAC
- Longstone GAC
- Loughinisland
- Mayobridge
- John Mitchel GFC
- Cumann Pheadair Naofa (formerly known as Warrenpoint GAA)
- Newry Bosco GFC
- Newry Shamrocks – Website
- Portaferry
- Saul – Website
- Saval – Website
- St Bronaghʼs GAA
- St John's, Drumnaquoile
- St Michael's, Kilwarlin – Website
- St Paul's – Website
- Teconnaught
- Tullylish – Website
- Warrenpoint GAA

== Football ==
=== Clubs ===
The county's most successful football club is Kilcoo. Kilcoo has won the Down Senior Football Championship on eighteen occasions, and also won the Ulster Senior Club Football Championship in 2019 and 2021, as well as the 2021–22 All-Ireland Senior Club Football Championship.

=== County team ===
Down has won the All-Ireland Senior Football Championship (SFC) on five occasions, most recently in 1994. Down was not regarded as a football stronghold when Queen's University won the 1958 Sigerson Cup, and some of its leading players turned their thoughts to Down's county team dilemma. Down won the 1959 Ulster Senior Football Championship (SFC) title with six inter-changeable forwards who introduced off-the-ball running and oddities such as track-suits. In 1960, two goals in a three-minute period from James McCartan and Paddy Doherty helped Down to defeat Kerry, who were almost completely unbeaten at the time, and which brought to an end the Kerry football regime for a few years. In 1961, Down defeated Offaly by one point in a game that featured five first half goals. In that three-year period their supporters surpassed every attendance record in the book. When Down played Offaly in 1961 they set a record attendance of 90,556 for a GAA game. Against Dublin in the 1964 National League final a record crowd of 70,125 attended. The 71,573 who watched Down play Kerry in 1961 still stands as a record for an All-Ireland SFC semi-final. In 1968, Down defeated Kerry with Sean O'Neill and John Murphy goals, again in a two-minute spell. Despite a famous prediction that Down would go on to win three-in-a-row, the county took twenty years to regain its status.

In 1991, Down surprised heavy favourites Meath, a team that had established a trademark of durability, heavy second half scoring and late charges to save and win games, with the ability to outlast the stamina of their opponents. Following a series of pulsating comebacks, notably against Dublin in a series of replayed encounters, they had been christened "the team that couldn't be beaten". To counter this strength, rather than attempt to conserve energy as previous teams had attempted unsuccessfully against Meath, Down unexpectedly chose to tear into the game and the opposition with speed and ferocity from the opening whistle, with Barry Breen scoring the goal that sent his team into a huge lead of eleven points with twenty minutes to go; despite a trademark late charge, it proved a gap that even Meath could not quite overcome as Down won 1-16 to 1-14 and brought the Sam Maguire Cup back to Ulster, and the North, for the first time in 23 years - it wouldn't leave again for half a decade. In his victory speech as the winning coach, Peter McGrath christened his Down charges "the team that beat the team that couldn't be beaten".

In 1994, Mickey Linden sent James McCartan in for a goal directly under Hill 16, a goal which silenced Dublin and helped Down claim its fifth All-Ireland SFC title in its fifth final, the fourth consecutive win for an Ulster team. The 1994 win proved, however, to be the last major title for the football side until 2024, when Down beat Laois to claim the Tier 2 2024 Tailteann Cup, and with it, entry into the 2025 All-Ireland Senior Championship round robin.

== Hurling ==
=== Clubs ===
Five Down hurling clubs, Carryduff, Ballycran, Ballygalget, Portaferry and Bredagh play in the Antrim League. Ballycran and Portaferry used the experience to win Ulster Senior Club Hurling Championships. Ballygalget, Portaferry and Ballycran play in Antrim Div 1 while Carryduff and Bredagh play in Div 2.

Clubs also contest the Down Senior Hurling Championship.

=== County team ===
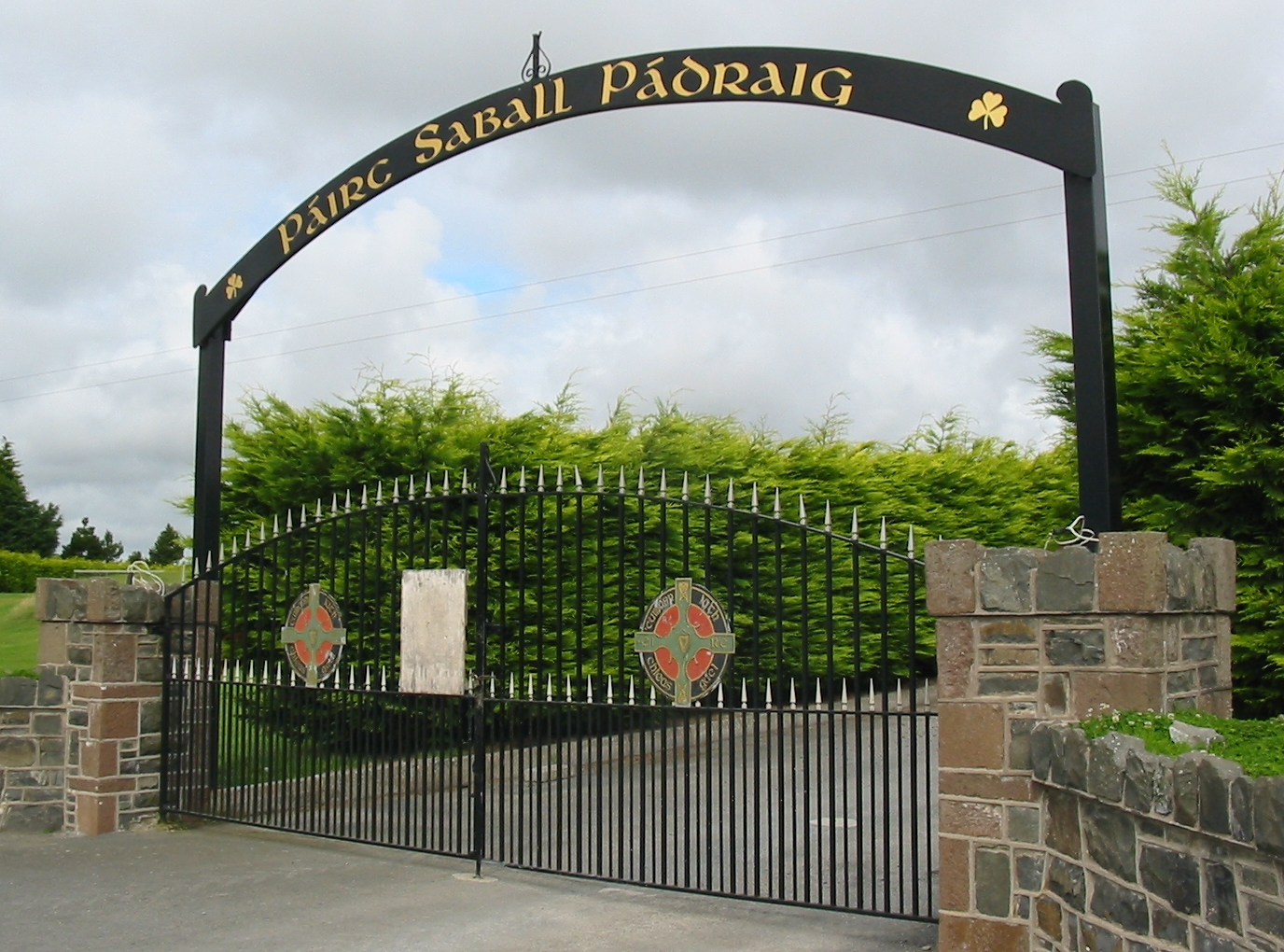
Entrance to sports ground, Saul, County Down

Down played in the Leinster Minor Hurling Championship for three years in the 1970s, even playing Antrim in an unusual Leinster semi-final at Croke Park in 1979 (neither county is located in Leinster). Although Down had not won the All-Ireland B championship in four final appearances, when the Ulster Senior Hurling Championship was revived, Down won titles in 1992, 1995 and 1997, losing the All-Ireland semi-finals by 14, 11 and 16 points. Down defeated Kilkenny in a Division 1 match in 1993 by a scoreline of 1–12 to 1–11. Down hurlers won the Christy Ring Cup for the first time in 2013, their greatest All-Ireland level success to date. This entitled them to enter the 2014 All-Ireland Senior Hurling Championship; however, Down opted to remain in the 2nd tier competition on this occasion.

== Camogie ==
Under Camogie's National Development Plan 2010-2015, "Our Game, Our Passion", five new camogie clubs were to be established in the county by 2015. Leitrim Fontenoys won the 2004 and 2005 All Ireland junior club title.

Down contested the final of the All-Ireland Senior Camogie Championship in 1948, having beaten Galway 1-5 to 1-1 in the All Ireland semi-final, with N Mallon the captain, one of the players a 13-year-old girl, and S Fitzpatrick, S Magee and S Reevy among the other members of the team. Down won the inaugural All Ireland junior championship in 1968 and inaugural All-Ireland Minor (Under-16) Camogie Championship in 1974, Down won further All Ireland junior championship titles in 1976 and 1991.

Paul Donnelly managed the senior camogie team for three seasons, until 2024. The injured Antrim hurler Domhnall Nugent succeeded Donnelly as manager. Síghle Nic an Ultaigh and Belle O'Loughlin were both presidents of the Camogie Association for a time in the twentieth century.

== Ladies' football ==
Down has a ladies' football team.
