= 2024–25 All-Ireland Intermediate Club Hurling Championship =

All-Ireland inter-county competition for intermediate clubs

Championship Details
- Dates: 26 October 2024 – 12 January 2025
- Teams: 26

All Ireland Champions
- Winners: Watergrasshill (1st win)
- Captain: Seán Desmond
- Manager: Eddie Enright

All Ireland Runners-up
- Runners-up: Tynagh-Abbey/Duniry
- Captain: Paul Killeen & Johnny Conroy
- Manager: Mattie Kenny

Provincial Champions
- Munster: Watergrasshill
- Leinster: Rathnure St Anne's
- Ulster: Carey Faughs
- Connacht: Tynagh-Abbey/Duniry

Championship Statistics
- Matches Played: 25
- Total Goals: 58 (2.32 per game)
- Total Points: 814 (32.56 per game)
- Top Scorer: Adam Murphy (2-40)

The 2024–25 All-Ireland Intermediate Club Hurling Championship was the 20th staging of the All-Ireland Intermediate Club Hurling Championship, the Gaelic Athletic Association's intermediate inter-county club hurling tournament. The championship ran from 26 October 2024 to 12 January 2025.

The All-Ireland final was played on 12 January 2025 at Croke Park in Dublin, between Watergrasshill from Cork and Tynagh-Abbey/Duniry from Galway, in what was their first ever meeting in the final. Watergrasshill won the match by 2–15 to 0–18 to claim their first ever All-Ireland title.

Watergrasshill's Adam Murphy was the championship's top scorer with 2-40.

== Format ==
Several Irish counties play a county hurling championship, with one club progressing to the All-Ireland Senior Club Intermediate Championship. This includes the top-ranked competition (Senior County Championship) in several mid-ranked hurling counties, and the second-ranked competition (called Senior B, Intermediate or Premier Intermediate) in the top hurling counties.

Each province plays their own championship (all being straight knockout) with the four provincial champions qualifying for the All-Ireland Intermediate semi-finals. The London champions play in the Connacht championship.

The senior champions of the top hurling counties play in the 2024–25 All-Ireland Senior Club Hurling Championship. Other lower-ranked county winners play in the 2024–25 All-Ireland Junior Club Hurling Championship.

== Team summaries ==
Team	Championship	Most recent success		
Team	Championship	All-Ireland	Provincial	County
Abbeydorney	Kerry SHC			1974
Borris-in-Ossory–Kilcotton	Laois PIHC			
Bray Emmets	Wicklow SHC		2022	2023
Bredagh	Down IHC			2023
Brickey Rangers	Waterford PIHC			
Burt	Donegal SHC			2018
Carey Faughs	Antrim IHC		2004	2022
Cashel King Cormacs	Tipperary PIHC			
Castleblayney	Monaghan SHC			2022
Clodiagh Gaels	Offaly SBHC			2021
Commercials	Dublin IHC			1991
Éire Óg Carrickmore	Tyrone SHC			2023
Four Roads	Roscommon SHC			2023
Fr. Dalton's	Westmeath SBHC			2022
Lisbellaw St Patrick's	Fermanagh SHC			2013
Lisdowney	Kilkenny IHC			2020
Middletown Na Fianna	Armagh SHC		2017	2023
Newcastle West	Limerick PIHC			
Rathnure	Wexford IHC			1971
Ratoath	Meath SHC			1963
St Gabriel's	London SHC			2022
Swatragh	Derry IHC			2020
Tooreen	Mayo SHC		2023	2023
Tynagh-Abbey/Duniry	Galway IHC		2009	2009
Watergrasshill	Cork PIHC			
Wolfe Tones na Sionna	Clare IHC		2015	2015

== Connacht Intermediate Club Hurling Championship ==
The fixtures for the Connacht Club Championship were released in September 2024.

=== Connacht quarter-final ===
26 October 2024 Quarter-final	Four Roads (Roscommon)	3-12 - 2-25	Tooreen (Mayo)	Dr Hyde Park
	C Dolan 0-6 (2f, 1 s/l), C Mulry 1-1, A Donnelly (f) and T Morris 1-0 each, C Morris 0-3, L Óg Coyle and E Mulry 0-1 each.	Report	F Boland 2-2, S Boland 0-8 (3f), L Lavin 0-5, E Delaney 0-3, B Douglas 0-2 (1f), J Boyle, O Greally, D Huane, F Burke and C Finn 0-1 each.

=== Connacht semi-final ===
10 November 2024 Semi-final	St Gabriel's (London)	1-12 – 1-22	Tooreen (Mayo)	Dr Hyde Park
	D Coyne 1-2, S Glynn 0-4, Conor O'Carroll 0-3, R Lodge 0-1, A Curtin 0-1, E Kelly 0-1.	Report	S Boland 0-7, E Delaney 1-3, F Boland 0-4, L Lavin 0-2, S Kenny 0-2, K Feeney 0-2, B Douglas 0-1, C Finn 0-1.

=== Connacht final ===
23 November 2024 Final	Tooreen (Mayo)	1-14 - 0-19	Tynagh-Abbey/Duniry (Galway)	Dr Hyde Park
13:30 IWT (UTC±0)	E Delaney (1-2); K Feeney (0-4), S Boland (0-2f), D Huane (0-2), S Kenny (0-1f); F Boland (0-1), C Finn (0-1), B Morley (0-1).	Report	S Moloney (0-9, 7f, 1 65'); M Power (0-2), B Moran (0-2); N Moloney (0-1), P Killeen (0-1), S Fitzpatrick (0-1); J Conroy (0-1), P Breheny (0-1), T Murphy (0-1).

== Leinster Intermediate Club Hurling Championship ==
The draw for the Leinster Club Championship took place in June 2024.

=== Leinster quarter-finals ===
16 November 2024 Quarter-final	Bray Emmets (Wicklow)	2-17 - 1-19	Ratoath (Meath)	Echelon Park
13:30 IWT (UTC±0)	C Moorehouse (0-14, 12f, 1 65), B Nesbitt (1-0), M Lennon (1-0), P Doyle (0-1), D Lohan (0-1); D Maloney (0-1).	Report	P O’Hanrahan (0-7, 4f); B McMahon (0-5), S Corbett (1-1), C Rogers (0-4), D McGowan (0-1), G McGowan (0-1).

16 November 2024 Quarter-final	Rathnure St Anne's (Wexford)	3-18 - 1-17	Commercials (Dublin)	Bellefield
13:30 IWT (UTC±0)	M Redmond 0-6, J Redmond 1-1, S Lawlor 1-0, S O'Connor 1-0, AJ Redmond 0-3, J Tobin 0-2, R Higgins 0-2, C O'Connor 0-1, M Martin 0-1, L Codd 0-1, E Wickham 0-1.	Report	D Ó Dúlaing 1-10, A Drewitt 0-4, R Butler 0-1, C Cleary 0-1, É Ó Nualláin 0-1.

16 November 2024 Quarter-final	Fr Daltons (Westmeath)	0-10 - 2-16	Borris-in-Ossory–Kilcotton (Laois)	Fr Éamonn O'Brien Park
13:30 IWT (UTC±0)	O McCabe 0-6, E Kincaid 0-2, J Duncan 0-1, B McCabe 0-1.	Report	N Quinlan 1-3, PJ Scully 0-6, A Dunphy 1-2, N Coss 0-2, J Quinlan 0-1, C Kilbane 0-1.

16 November 2024 Quarter-final	Lisdowney (Kilkenny)	3-23 - 1-10	Clodiagh Gaels (Offaly)	UPMC Nowlan Park
13:30 IWT (UTC±0)	B Kavanagh (1-5, 0-3 f, 0-1 65); E Kenny (2-2); N Brennan (0-5), M Kenny, R McEvoy, V Fitzpatrick (0-2 each), A Tallis (0-1 f); E Walsh, L Dunphy, L Holohan, E McEvoy (0-1 each).	Report	L Langton (0-6, 0-5 f); P Lyons (1-0); E Dunne; C Brady (0-2 each).

=== Leinster semi-finals ===
23 November 2024 Semi-final	Borris-in-Ossory–Kilcotton (Laois)	2-13 - 2-15	Lisdowney (Kilkenny)	O'Moore Park
13:30 IWT (UTC±0)	PJ Scully 0-8, A Dunphy 1-2, N Coss 1-1, C Kilbane 0-1, E Fleming 0-1.	Report	B Kavanagh 0-6, C Jordan 1-1, L Holohan 1-0, R McEvoy 0-3, L Dunphy 0-2, P O'Carroll 0-2, M Kenny 0-1.

24 November 2024 Semi-final	Bray Emmets (Wicklow)	2-14 - 1-21	Rathnure St Anne's (Wexford)	Echelon Park
13:30 IWT (UTC±0)	C Moorehouse 1-10, A Murphy 1-0, L Maloney 0-1, P Doyle 0-1, D Moloney 0-1, B Nesbitt 0-1.	Report	J Redmond 0-13, S O'Connor 1-0, S Lawlor 0-2, C O'Connor 0-2, R Higgns 0-2, S Martin 0-1, M Redmond 0-1.

=== Leinster final ===
1 December 2024 Final	Rathnure St Anne's (Wexford)	0-24 - 1-16	Lisdowney (Kilkenny)	Chadwicks Wexford Park
13:30 IWT (UTC±0)	J Redmond 0-12 (1 ’65, 3 frees), M Redmond 0-3, S Lawler 0-4, C O’Connor, S O’Connor 0-2 each, A.J. Redmond 0-1	Report	B Kavanagh 0-7 (7 fs), R McEvoy 1-2, C Jordan, L Dunphy 0-2 each, P O’Carroll, N Brennan, L Holohan 0-1 each

== Munster Intermediate Club Hurling Championship ==
The draw for the Munster Club Championship took place on 25 July 2024.

=== Munster quarter-final ===
3 November 2024 Quarter-final	Newcastle West (Limerick)	2-13 - 0-20	Cashel King Cormacs (Tipperary)	Newcastle West Grounds
	B Nix 2-2; Cathal Hayes 0-4 (0-2 frees); Eoin Hurley 0-3 (0-3 frees); M Quilligan (0-2 frees); D Lyons 0-2 each.	Report	E Connolly 0-9 (0-6 frees; 0-2 ‘65); D Ryan 0-8 (0-4 frees); C Quinn, O O’Donoghue, C Bonnar 0-1 each.

3 November 2024 Quarter-final	Brickey Rangers (Waterford)	0-24 - 0-25 (aet)	Abbeydorney (Kerry)	Fraher Field
	T O'Connell (0-8; 0-6f); P Cummins and S Lennon (0-4 each); C Deevy (0-3); C O'Grady, M Cummins, C Whelan, S Ronayne, B Cullinan (0-1 each)	Report	M O'Leary (0-10; 0-5f); O Maunsell (0-5); J Sheehan (0-3); M Slattery (0-2); D Egan, D O'Leary, C O'Sullivan, N O'Mahoney, J Hannon (0-1 each)

=== Munster semi-finals ===
16 November 2024 Semi-final	Watergrasshill (Cork)	2-20 - 2-13	Wolfe Tones na Sionna (Clare)	Páirc Uí Rinn
	A Murphy (0-12, 9 frees); S Desmond (1-2); B Lehane (1-1); S O’Regan (0-2); A Foley (free), L Foley, I O’Callaghan (0-1 each).	Report	C O’Rourke (3 frees), A Shanagher (1 free) (0-5 each); D Devanney (1-1); A Cunningham (1-0); J Guilfoyle, E O’Gorman (0-1 each).	Referee: A Tierney (Tipperary)

17 November 2024 Semi-final	Abbeydorney (Kerry)	1-14 - 3-16	Cashel King Cormacs (Tipperary)	Tom Healy Park
	M O’Leary (1-10, 6fs, 1’65), N O’Mahony and O Maunsell, plus own point (0-1 each).	Report	D Ryan (0-5, 4fs), O O’Donoghue (1-0), G Browne ( 1-1), R Bonnar (1-0), D McGrath (0-3), A Cummins and E Connolly (0-2 each), J Cummins, R Connolly and C Quinn (0-1 each).

=== Munster final ===
30 November 2024 Final	Watergrasshill (Cork)	1-20 - 0-14	Cashel King Cormacs (Tipperary)	TUS Gaelic Grounds
18:00 IWT (UTC±0)	A Murphy 1-12 (0-7f), B Lehane 0-3, A Cronin, P O’Leary, S O’Regan, L Foley, I O’Callaghan, C O’Leary 0-1 each.	Report	D Ryan 0-7, O O’Donoghue, A Cummins, E Connolly (0-2 sideline) 0-2 each, G Browne 0-1.	Referee: N Malone (Clare)

== Ulster Intermediate Club Hurling Championship ==
=== Ulster quarter-finals ===
2 November 2024 Quarter-final	Middletown Na Fianna (Armagh)	1-13 - 0-17	Castleblayney (Monaghan)	BOX-IT Athletic Grounds
	R Grimes 1-2, N Curry 0-5 (4f), C McArdle 0-1, R Gaffney 0-1, S McGuinness 0-1 (1f), C Gormley 0-1, B Toal 0-1, C Carvill 0-1.	Report	N Garland 0-6 (4f), T Hughes 0-4, M Treanor 0-2, D Hughes 0-2, F Rafter 0-1, C McNally 0-1, B McGuigan 0-1.

2 November 2024 Quarter-final	Lisbellaw St Patrick's (Fermanagh)	2-11 - 2-16	Swatragh (Derry)	Brewster Park
	C Duffy 0-7, P McGarry 1-1, A Flanagan 1-0, J Duffy 0-2, S Corrigan 0-1.	Report	PJ O'Connell 1-3, J Friel 0-5, M Quinn 0-5, M McCormack 1-0, P Gunning 0-2, C Murray 0-1.

3 November 2024 Quarter-final	Bredagh (Down)	0-23 - 1-18	Burt (Donegal)	Páirc Esler
	D Hughes 0-6, B Christie 0-5 (4f), T Sheehan 0-3 (2f), E Kennedy 0-3, M Patterson 0-2, R McCampbell 0-1, J Hanrahan 0-1, J McCollum 0-1, S Hughes 0-1, M Lavery 1-0 (own goal).	Report	L McKinney 0-14 (12f), A McKinney 0-2, K Brady 0-1, C Gartland 0-1.

3 November 2024 Quarter-final	Éire Óg Carrickmore (Tyrone)	0-20 - 2-14 (a.e.t.) (2–3 p)	Carey Faughs (Antrim)	Páirc Colmcille
	A Kelly (0-10, 6f), O Daly (0-2), C Grogan (0-2); J Kelly (0-2), B McGurk (0-1), A Woods (0-1), S Og Grogan (0-1), S Sweeney (0-1);	Report	C McGlynn (1-7, 0-6f); C McKinley (1-2), J McCouaig (0-2); C McBride (0-2), C McCaughan (0-1).

=== Ulster semi-finals ===
17 November 2024 Semi-final	Bredagh (Down)	0-13 - 1-16	Swatragh (Derry)	Fr McGuigan Park
	B Christie 0-5; MT Sheehan 0-4f; D Hughes 0-2; M Lavery & S Hughes 0-1 each	Report	J Friel 0-5 (0-4f); PJ O’Connell & SM Quinn (3f) 0-3 each; O O’Kane (1-0); T Walsh, P Gunning, C Murray & F McGurk (0-1 each)

24 November 2024 Semi-final	Carey Faughs (Antrim)	1-11 - 0-10	Castleblayney (Monaghan)	Páirc Colmcille
13:30 GMT (UTC±0)	C McBride 1-1, C McGlynn 0-3, C Kane 0-2, C McKinley 0-2, J Black 0-2, C McCaughan 0-1.	Report	F Rafter 0-7, M Treanor 0-1, B McGuigan 0-1, D Hughes 0-1.

=== Ulster final ===
30 November 2024 Final	Carey Faughs (Antrim)	1-11 - 0-13	Swatragh (Derry)	St Patrick's Park
13:00 GMT (UTC±0)	C McKinley 1-1, C McGlynn 0-3 (1’65, 1f); J Black 0-2, C McCaughan 0-2, P Butler 0-2, J McCouaig 0-1	Report	J Friel 0-5 (4f), S M Quinn 0-4 (3f), C Murray 0-1, D Bradley 0-1, PJ O’Connell 0-1

== All-Ireland Intermediate Club Hurling Championship ==
=== All-Ireland semi-finals ===
14 December 2024 Semi-final	Tynagh-Abbey/Duniry (Galway)	2-19 - 2-11	Rathnure St Anne's (Wexford)	Glenisk O'Connor Park
13:00 IWT (UTC±0)	S Moloney 0-6 (5fs), P Breheny 1-4, C Jordan 0-4, P Killeen 1-1, J Conroy 0-2, D Jordan 0-2.	Report	J Redmond 1-5 (1-0 pen, 2fs), S Lawler 1-1, AJ Redmond 0-2 (1f, 1 65), R Higgins 0-2, E Wickham 0-1	Referee: Conor Doyle (Tipperary)

15 December 2024 Semi-final	Watergrasshill (Cork)	1-21 - 0-08	Carey Faughs (Antrim)	Páirc Tailteann
13:00 IWT (UTC±0)	S Desmond 1-5, A Murphy 0-8 (0-7 f), B Lehane 0-3, P O’Leary, S O’Regan, A Cronin, D O’Leary, I O’Callaghan 0-1 each.	Report	C McGlynn 0-4 f, C McBride 0-2, C Cane (f), C McCaughan 0-1 each.

=== All-Ireland final ===
12 January 2025 Final	Tynagh-Abbey/Duniry (Galway)	0-18 - 2-15	Watergrasshill (Cork)	Croke Park
	S Moloney 0-10 (0-4 f, 0-1 65), B Moran 0-4 (0-2 f), N Moloney, P Killeen, D Jorgan, K Moloney 0-1 each.	Report	A Murphy 1-8 (0-3 f, 0-1 65), S Desmond 1-3, B Lehane, A Cronin, P O’Leary, D Roche 0-1 each.	Referee: C McDonald (Antrim)

== Championship statistics ==
=== Top scorers ===
Overall

Rank	Player	Club	Tally	Total	Matches	Average
1	Adam Murphy	Watergrasshill	2-40	46	4	11.50
2	Jack Redmond	Rathnure St Anne's	2-31	37	4	9.25
3	Christy Moorehouse	Bray Emmets	1-24	27	2	13.50
4	Shane Moloney	Tynagh-Abbey/Duniry	0-25	25	3	8.33
5	Michael O'Leary	Abbeydorney	1-20	23	2	11.50
6	Brian Kavanagh	Lisdowney	1-18	21	3	7.00
7	Devon Ryan	Cashel King Cormacs	0-20	20	3	6.66
8	Conall McGlynn	Carey Faughs	1-17	20	4	5.00
9	Seán Desmond	Watergrasshill	3-10	19	4	4,75
10	Shane Boland	Tooreen	0-17	17	3	5.66

Single game

Rank	Player	Club	Tally	Total	Opposition
1	Adam Murphy	Watergrasshill	1-12	15	Cashel King Cormacs
2	Liam Óg McKinney	Burt	0-14	14	Bredagh
2	Christy Moorehouse	Bray Emmets	0-14	14	Ratoath
4	Michael O'Leary	Abbeydorney	1-10	13	Cashel King Cormacs
4	Diarmaid Ó Dúlaing	Commercials	1-10	13	Rathnure St Anne's
4	Christy Moorehouse	Bray Emmets	1-10	13	Rathnure St Anne's
4	Jack Redmond	Rathnure St Anne's	0-13	13	Bray Emmets
8	Adam Murphy	Watergrasshill	0-12	12	Wolfe Tones
8	Jack Redmond	Rathnure St Anne's	0-12	12	Lisdowney
10	Adam Murphy	Watergrasshill	1-08	11	Tynagh-Abbey/Duniry
