= Seán Meally =

Irish hurler

Personal information
- Native name: Seán Ó Meallaigh (Irish)
- Born: 1973 (age 52–53) Castlecomer, County Kilkenny, Ireland
- Occupation: Electrical contractor
- Height: 6 ft 0 in (183 cm)

Sport
- Sport: Hurling
- Position: Full-back
Club
- Years: Club
- Erin's Own
Club titles
- Kilkenny titles: 0
Inter-county
Years	County	Apps (scores)
1994–2002	Kilkenny	1 (0-00)
Inter-county titles
- Leinster titles: 3
- All-Irelands: 1
- NHL: 1
- All Stars: 0

Seán Meally (born 1973) is an Irish former hurler. At club level, he played with Erin's Own and at inter-county level with the Kilkenny senior hurling team.

== Career ==
Born and raised in Castlecomer, County Kilkenny, Meally played hurling at all levels as a student at Castlecomer Community School. He was part of the school's senior team that won the All-Ireland Colleges SBHC title after a defeat of Coláiste Mhuire in 1988.

At club level, Meally first played for Erin's Own at juvenile and underage levels before progressing to the club's adult team. He was part of the extended team when they beat Carrickshock by 2–12 to 1–14 to win the Kilkenny IHC in 2003. Meally won a second Kilkenny IHC medal after a defeat of Danesfot in 2008.

Meally first appeared on the inter-county scene with Kilkenny as part of the minor team that won back-to-back All-Ireland MHC titles in 1990 and 1991. He progressed to the under-21 team and won an All-Ireland U21HC in what his last game in the grade in 1994. Meally was also part of the junior team that beat Clare by 1–20 to 1–06 in the 1995 All-Ireland JHC final.

As well as being part of the junior team, Meally was a member of the senior team's extended panel during their 1994–95 National League-winning campaign. He was on and off the panel over the following few seasons before rejoining the extended panel in 1999. Meally went on to win three consecutive Leinster SHC medals. He was also an unused substitute when Kilkenny beat Offaly by 5–15 to 1–14 in the 2000 All-Ireland SHC final.

== Honours ==
Castlecomer Community School

- All-Ireland Colleges Senior B Hurling Championship: 1988
- Leinster Colleges Senior B Hurling Championship: 1988

Erin's Own

- Kilkenny Intermediate Hurling Championship: 2003, 2008

Kilkenny

- All-Ireland Senior Hurling Championship: 2000
- Leinster Senior Hurling Championship: 1999, 2000, 2001
- National Hurling League: 1994–95
- All-Ireland Junior Hurling Championship: 1995
- Leinster Junior Hurling Championship: 1994, 1995
- All-Ireland Under-21 Hurling Championship: 1994
- Leinster Under-21 Hurling Championship: 1993, 1994
- All-Ireland Minor Hurling Championship: 1990, 1991
- Leinster Minor Hurling Championship: 1990, 1991
