= Pat Hoban (hurler) =

Irish hurler

Personal information
- Born: 1968 (age 57–58) Mullinavat, County Kilkenny, Ireland
- Occupation: Business development manager
- Height: 6 ft 4 in (193 cm)

Sport
- Sport: Hurling
- Position: Full-forward
Club
- Years: Club
- Mullinavat
Club titles
- Kilkenny titles: 0
Inter-county
- Years: County
- 1991-1992: Kilkenny
Inter-county titles
- Leinster titles: 1
- All-Irelands: 1
- NHL: 0
- All Stars: 0

Patrick Hoban (born 1968) is an Irish hurling manager and former player. At club level he lined out with Mullinavat and was also a member of the Kilkenny senior hurling team. Hoban later served as a manager with various Kilkenny teams.

== Playing career ==
Born in Mullinavat, County Kilkenny, Hoban first came to prominence at juvenile and underage levels with the local club. He eventually joined the club's top adult team and was a member of their County Intermediate Championship-winning teams in 1989 and 2001. Hoban first appeared on the inter-county scene as a member of the Kilkenny minor team in 1986 before later winning a Leinster Championship medal with the under-21 team in 1988. He made a number of National League appearances with the Kilkenny senior hurling team and was an unused substitute on the 1992 All-Ireland Championship-winning team. Hoban was also a two-time All-Ireland-winner with the Kilkenny junior team.

== Managerial career ==
After his retirement from playing, Hoban first became involved in club management before a four-year stint as manager of the Kilkenny intermediate team. During this period he guided the team to four successive All-Ireland final appearances, with Kilkenny claiming the titles in 2008 and 2010. During a subsequent four-year period as Kilkenny minor manager, Hoban won the All-Ireland Championship title in 2014.

== Honours ==
=== Player ===
Mullinavat

- Kilkenny Intermediate Hurling Championship: 1989, 2001

Kilkenny

- All-Ireland Senior Hurling Championship: 1992
- Leinster Senior Hurling Championship: 1992
- All-Ireland Junior Hurling Championship: 1990, 1995
- Leinster Junior Hurling Championship: 1990, 1995
- Leinster Under-21 Hurling Championship: 1988

=== Manager ===
Ballyhale Shamrocks

- All-Ireland Senior Club Hurling Championship: 2023
- Leinster Senior Club Hurling Championship: 2022
- Kilkenny Senior Hurling Championship: 2022

Kilkenny

- All-Ireland Intermediate Hurling Championship: 2008, 2010
- Leinster Intermediate Hurling Championship: 2008, 2009, 2010, 2011
- All-Ireland Minor Hurling Championship: 2014
- Leinster Minor Hurling Championship: 2013, 2014, 2015
