= Eddie Enright =

Irish hurling manager & player (born 1974)

Personal information
- Native name: Éamonn Mac Ionnrachtaigh (Irish)
- Born: 29 December 1974 (age 51) Thurles, County Tipperary, Ireland
- Height: 6 ft 1 in (185 cm)

Sport
- Sport: Hurling
- Position: Midfield
Clubs
- Years: Club
- 1992-2007 1994-1999 2008-2011: Thurles Sarsfields → UCC; Watergrasshill
Club titles
- Tipperary titles: 1
College
- Years: College
- University College Cork
College titles
- Fitzgibbon titles: 3
Inter-county
Years	County	Apps (scores)
1999-2006	Tipperary	24 (0-13)
Inter-county titles
- Munster titles: 1
- All-Irelands: 1
- NHL: 2
- All Stars: 1

Eddie Enright (born 29 December 1974) is an Irish hurling manager, selector and former player. At club level, he played with Thurles Sarsfields and at inter-county level with the Tipperary senior hurling team.

== Playing career ==
Enright first played hurling to a high standard as a student at CBS Thurles. He lined out in all grades during his time there, including the Dr Harty Cup. Enright later attended University College Cork and won three consecutive Fitzgibbon Cup medals, including one as team captain in 1998.

At club level, Enright first played with the Durlas Óg juvenile club. He won several divisional and county medals as a dual player in the under-12 grade. Enright subsequently progressed to adult level with Thurles Sarsfields. He won six Mid Tipperary SHC medals between 1993 and 2007. Enright also won a Tipperary SHC medal in 2005, following a 1–17 to 0–15 defeat of Drom-Inch in the final. He ended his club career with the Watergrasshill club in Cork after transferring there in 2008.

Enright first appeared on the inter-county scene with Tipperary at under-21 level. He won a Munster U21HC medal, as well as being part of the Tipperary team that beat Kilkenny in the 1995 All-Ireland under-21 final. Enright made his senior team debut during Tipperary's National Hurling League-winning campaign in 1999. He collected a second league winner' medal in 2001. Tipperary made a clean sweep of all the major hurling competitions that season, with Enright later winning a Munster SHC title before Tipperary beat Galway in the 2001 All-Ireland final. He ended the season with an All-Star. He brought his inter-county career to an end in January 2006.

== Management career ==
Enright first became involved in team management and coaching with University College Cork. He was a selector when the college claimed the Fitzgibbon Cup title in 2012, before managing the team to retaining the title in 2013.

Enright managed the Watergrasshill club to the Cork PIHC title after a 2-16 to 0-19 win over Carrigaline in 2024. The club later claimed the Munster Club IHC title after beating Cashel King Cormacs. Enright guided the club to the All-Ireland Club IHC following a 2-15 to 0-18 defeat of Tynagh-Abbey/Duniry in the 2025 All-Ireland club final.

== Honours ==
=== Player ===
University College Cork

- Fitzgibbon Cup: 1996, 1997, 1998 (c)

Thurles Sarsfields

- Tipperary Senior Hurling Championship: 2005
- Mid Tipperary Senior Hurling Championship: 1993, 1996, 2000, 2001, 2005, 2007
- Mid Tipperary Under-21 A Hurling Championship: 1992, 1995
- Mid Tipperary Minor A Hurling Championship: 1992

Tipperary

- All-Ireland Senior Hurling Championship: 2001
- Munster Senior Hurling Championship: 2001
- National Hurling League: 1999, 2001
- All-Ireland Under-21 Hurling Championship: 1995
- Munster Under-21 Hurling Championship: 1995

=== Management ===
University College Cork

- Fitzgibbon Cup: 2012, 2013

Watergrasshill

- All-Ireland Intermediate Club Hurling Championship: 2025
- Munster Intermediate Club Hurling Championship: 2024
- Cork Premier Intermediate Hurling Championship: 2024
