= 1995 All-Ireland Junior Hurling Championship =

Championship Details
- Dates: 21 May - 12 August 1995
- Teams: 11

All Ireland Champions
- Winners: Kilkenny (9th win)
- Captain: Joe Murphy
- Manager: Noel Skehan

All Ireland Runners-up
- Runners-up: Clare
- Captain: Ray O'Halloran

Provincial Champions
- Munster: Clare
- Leinster: Kilkenny
- Ulster: Tyrone
- Connacht: Not Played

Championship Statistics
- Top Scorer: Pat Bennett (1-26)

The 1995 All-Ireland Junior Hurling Championship was the 74th staging of the All-Ireland Junior Championship since its establishment by the Gaelic Athletic Association in 1912.

Cork entered the championship as the defending champions, however, they were beaten by Clare in the Munster semi-final.

The All-Ireland final was played on 12 August at Semple Stadium in Thurles, between Kilkenny and Clare, in what was their second meeting in the final in three years. Kilkenny won the match by 1-20 to 1-06 to claim their 9th and final championship title and a first title since 1990.

== Results ==
=== Leinster Junior Hurling Championship ===
==== Leinster quarter-final ====
24 May 1995 Quarter-final	Laois	2-14 - 2-13	Offaly	O'Moore Park
	S Kennedy 0-7, E Fitzpatrick 1-2, J Fitzpatrick 1-1, P Peacock 0-2, B Shaughnessy 0-1, S Flynn 0-1.		S Óg Farrell 1-2, T Dooley 0-4, J Phelan 1-0, E Martin 0-3, D Miller 0-3, K Weir 0-1.	Referee: P Neary (Kilkkenny)

==== Leinster semi-finals ====
7 June 1995 Semi-final	Dublin	2-05 - 5-17	Kilkenny	O'Toole Park
	T Daly 1-3, D Harrington 1-1, P Kearns 0-1.		O O'Connor 1-7, P Treacy 1-4, S Ryan 1-2, D Lawlor 1-1, R Kelly 1-0, P Farrell 0-2, A Cleere 0-1.

9 June 1995 Semi-final	Laois	1-05 - 3-16	Wexford	O'Moore Park
	S Kennedy 1-0, D Conroy 0-3, S Flynn 0-1, N Lacey 0-1.		J Byrne 0-9, T Kavanagh 1-1, S Whelan 1-1, M Morrissey 1-0, R Callaghan 0-2, J Bolger 0-2, D Prendergast 0-1.	Referee: P Horan (Offaly)

==== Leinster final ====
21 June 1995 Final	Wexford	4-05 - 2-14	Kilkenny	Wexford Park
	J McDonald 2-0, R Quigley 1-2, R O'Callaghan 1-0, J Bolger 0-2, R Guiney 0-1.		D Maher 1-2, O O'Connor 0-5, B O'Keeffe 1-1, R Kelly 0-2, P Treacy 0-2, S Ryan 0-1, A Cleere 0-1.

=== Munster Junior Hurling Championship ===
==== Munster first round ====
21 May 1995 First round	Waterford	1-11 - 1-10	Tipperary	Páirc Uí Chaoimh
	P Bennett 0-7, P Cunningham 1-0, S Ahearne 0-2, K Walsh 0-1, M Kelly 0-1.		D Corcoran 1-1, J Ryan 0-3, G McGuire 0-3, C Arrigan 0-2, A Waters 0-1.	Referee: W Horgan (Cork)

==== Munster semi-finals ====
4 June 1995 Semi-final	Clare	3-08 - 1-12	Cork	Gaelic Grounds
	R O'Halloran 1-4, C Gleeson 2-0, B Fitzgerald 0-2, B Moloney 0-1, B Healy 0-1.		M Landers 0-4, C Murphy 1-0, D Fleming 0-2, T Crowley 0-2, D Holland 0-1, M Daly 0-1, B O'Sullivan 0-1, J O'Connor 0-1.	Referee: TJ Corboy (Limerick)

18 June 1995 Semi-final	Waterford	1-13 - 2-10	Limerick	Páirc Uí Chaoimh
	P Bennett 0-5, JP Fitzpatrick 0-4, K Walsh 1-0, N Kelly 0-2, E Crotty 0-1, P Ryan 0-1.		Andrew Ryan 2-2, D Hennessy 0-5, O O'Neill 0-1, D Hickey 0-1, C O'Brien 0-1.

5 July 1995 Semi-final replay	Waterford	4-12 - 4-07	Limerick	Fraher Field
	P Bennett 1-7, N Kelly 2-1, S Ahearne 1-0, D Casey 0-1, B Doyle 0-1, E Crotty 0-1, P Ryan 0-1.		D Hennessy 1-5, S Laffan 1-1, O O'Neill 1-0, O Moriarty 1-0, C O'Brien 0-1.	Referee: A O'Sullivan (Clare)

==== Munster final ====
12 July 1995 Final	Clare	4-11 - 1-09	Waterford	Semple Stadium
	J McKenna 1-3, F Flynn 1-3, G Gleeson 1-1, B Healy 1-0, R O'Halloran 0-2, D Forde 0-2.		P Bennett 0-7, S Ahern 1-0, JP Fitzpatrick 0-2.	Referee: G Harrington (Cork)

=== All-Ireland Junior Hurling Championship ===
==== All-Ireland semi-final ====
29 July 1995 Semi-final	Kilkenny	2-10 - 0-12	Galway	St. Brendan's Park
	O O'Connor 1-2, S Ryan 1-0, P Farrell 0-3, B O'Keeffe 0-2, P Treacy 0-2, B Leahy 0-1.		G Daly 0-3, J Murray 0-3, M Kenny 0-2, K Clancy 0-1, D Gilligan 0-1, M Connolly 0-1, B Larkin 0-1.	Referee: G Harrington (Cork)

==== All-Ireland final ====
12 August 1995 Final	Kilkenny	1-20 - 1-06	Clare	Semple Stadium
	O O'Connor 0-7, S Ryan 1-2, P Farrell 0-4, D Maher 0-3, D Lawlor 0-2, P Treacy 0-1, T Murphy 0-1.		B Healy 1-2, R O'Halloran 0-2, B Moloney 0-1, D Forde 0-1.	Referee: J McDonnell (Tipperary)

== Championship statistics ==
=== Top scorers ===
Top scorers overall

Rank	Player	County	Tally	Total	Matches	Average
1	Pat Bennett	Waterford	1-26	29	4	7.25
2	Ollie O'Connor	Kilkenny	2-21	27	4	6.75
3	Seán Ryan	Kilkenny	3-05	14	4	3.50
4	David Hennessy	Limerick	1-10	13	2	6.50
5	Paul Treacy	Kilkenny	1-09	12	4	3.00

Top scorers in a single game

Rank	Player	Club	Tally	Total	Opposition
1	Ollie O'Connor	Kilkenny	1-07	10	Dublin
1	Pat Bennett	Waterford	1-07	10	Limerick
3	Jim Byrne	Wexford	0-09	9	Laois
4	Andrew Ryan	Limerick	2-02	8	Waterford
4	David Hennessy	Limerick	1-05	8	Waterford
6	Noel Kelly	Waterford	2-01	7	Limerick
6	Paul Treacy	Kilkenny	1-04	7	Dublin
6	Ray O'Halloran	Clare	1-04	7	Cork
6	Séamus Kennedy	Laois	0-07	7	Offaly
6	Pat Bennett	Waterford	0-07	7	Tipperary
6	Pat Bennett	Waterford	0-07	7	Clare
6	Ollie O'Connor	Kilkenny	0-07	7	Clare
