= 1993 All-Ireland Minor Hurling Championship =

All-Ireland Minor Hurling Championship 1993
Championship Details
- Dates: 7 April 1993 - 5 September 1993
- Teams: 15

All Ireland Champions
- Winners: Kilkenny (16th win)
- Captain: Shane Doyle
- Manager: Liam Barron

All Ireland Runners-up
- Runners-up: Galway
- Captain: Darragh Coen
- Manager: Mattie Murphy

Provincial Champions
- Munster: Tipperary
- Leinster: Kilkenny
- Ulster: Antrim
- Connacht: Not Played

Championship Statistics
- Top Scorer: Ollie O'Connor (5-35)

The 1993 All-Ireland Minor Hurling Championship was the 63rd staging of the All-Ireland Minor Hurling Championship since its establishment by the Gaelic Athletic Association in 1928. The championship began on 7 April 1993 and ended on 5 September 1993.

Galway entered the championship as the defending champions.

On 5 September 1993, Kilkenny won the championship following a 1–17 to 1–12 defeat of Galway in the All-Ireland final. This was their 16th championship title overall and their first title since 1991.

Kilkenny's Ollie O'Connor was the championship's top scorer with 5-35.

== Results ==
=== Leinster Minor Hurling Championship ===
Quarter-final

19 May 1993 Quarter-final	Kilkenny	0-16 - 1-13	Offaly	O'Moore Park, Portlaoise
	O O'Connor 0-7, B Dalton 0-3, D Cleere 0-2, L Smith 0-2, V O'Brien 0-1, E Mackey 0-1.		D Gleeson 0-7, P McNally 1-0, C Flanagan 0-2, P Mulhare 0-2, S Hand 0-1, D O'Meara 0-1.	Referee: P Delaney (Laois)

26 May 1993 Quarter-final replay	Kilkenny	4-05 - 0-04	Offaly	O'Moore Park, Portlaoise
	D Buggy 3-1, B Dalton 1-2, O O'Connor 0-2.		D Gleeson 0-3, D O'Meara 0-1.	Referee: P Delaney (Laois)

Semi-finals

30 June 1993 Semi-final	Kilkenny	4-05 - 2-09	Wexford	Dr. Cullen Park, Carlow
	O O'Connor 1-3, D Cleere 1-1, B Dalton 1-0, M O'Neill 1-0, K Hughes 0-1.		R McCarthy 2-0, M O'Leary 0-4, S Colfer 0-2, M Byrne 0-1, M Siggins 0-1, E Newport 0-1.	Referee: C Byrne

30 June 1993 Semi-final	Dublin	2-12 - 1-07	Laois	O'Connor Park, Tullamore
	K O'Donoghue 1-5, C Mac Criostail 1-1, T Donoghue 0-2, S Cooke 0-1, G Ennis 0-1, P Dillon 0-1, K Flynn 0-1.		D Cuddy 0-4, A Rowney 1-0, J Phelan 0-1, A Townsend 0-1, P Bowe 0-1.

Final

11 July 1993 Final	Kilkenny	4-14 - 0-11	Dublin	Croke Park, Dublin
	O O'Connor 2-7, D Cleere 1-4, E Mackey 1-0, D Buggy 0-2, L Smith 0-1.		K O'Donoghue 0-5, G Ennis 0-2, F Cooke 0-2, P Dillon 0-1, C Mac Criostail 0-1.	Referee: C Byrne (Wicklow)

=== Munster Minor Hurling Championship ===
First round

7 April 1993 First round	Cork	2-12 - 0-12	Waterford	Páirc Uí Chaoimh, Cork
	E Coleman 0-6, S McGrath 1-2, K Morrsion 0-4, J O'Flynn 1-0.		F O'Brien 0-5, T Carroll 0-2, B Ormonde 0-2, B Walsh 0-2, D O'Sullivan 0-1.	Referee: P O'Connor (Limerick)

7 April 1993 First round	Tipperary	1-17 - 0-06	Limerick	Semple Stadium, Thurles
	L Cahill 1-4, T Dunne 0-3, P Dwyer 0-2, T Moylan 0-2, D O'Connor 0-2, K Tucker 0-2, D Fogarty 0-1, S Maher 0-1.		B Tobin 0-2, D Reale 0-2, K Cregan 0-1, D Holmes 0-1.	Referee: S McMahon (Clare)

Semi-finals

28 April 1993 Semi-final	Cork	6-31 - 0-01	Kerry	Fr. Kelleher Park, Kilbrin
	E Coleman 0-9, D Coakley 1-5, J O'Flynn 2-1, S McGrath 1-4, K Morrison 1-2, P McSweeney 1-1, B Cuthbert 0-3, P O'Flynn 0-2, J Sheehan 0-2, M Ryan 0-1, T Coffey 0-1.			Referee: M Wadding (Waterford)

30 April 1993 Semi-final	Tipperary	2-13 - 3-10	Clare	Gaelic Grounds, Limerick
	J Enright 0-7, P O'Dwyer 1-0, D O'Connor 1-0, D Fogarty 0-1, T Dunne 0-1, L Cahill 0-1, S Maher 0-1, K Tucker 0-1, A Moloney 0-1.		B Minogue 2-1, M Conlon 0-5, B Murphy 1-0, E Taaffe 0-1, C Shannon 0-1, D Forde 0-1.	Referee: G Harrington (Cork)

14 May 1993 Semi-final replay	Tipperary	0-17 - 1-09	Clare	Gaelic Grounds, Limerick
	J Enright 0-5, P O'Dwyer 0-4, D O'Connor 0-2, K Tucker 0-2, L Cahill 0-1, D Fogarty 0-1, D O'Meara 0-1, B Phelan 0-1.		P Custy 1-1, P Minogue 0-2, T Fahy 0-2, D Forde 0-2, E Taaffe 0-1, M Conlon 0-1.	Referee: G Harrington (Cork)

Final

4 July 1993 Final	Tipperary	1-12 - 1-09	Cork	Gaelic Grounds, Limerick
	J Enright 1-7, P Croke 0-4, S Maher 0-1.		P McSweeney 1-0, M Ryan 0-2, E Coleman 0-2, K Morrison 0-2, S McGrath 0-1, P O'Connor 0-1, J O'Connell 0-1.	Referee: S McMahon (Clare)

=== Ulster Minor Hurling Championship ===
Semi-final

19 June 1993 Semi-final	Down	6-18 - 1-08	Derry	Casement Park, Belfast
	M Coulter 4-7, B Milligan 1-3, D Burns 1-2, C McGrattan 0-2, P Mageean 0-2, B Branniff 0-1, J McGrattan 0-1.		E Farren 1-0, N Stevenson 0-3, P Stevenson 0-3, M Herron 0-1, S McCartney 0-1.

Final

4 July 1993 Final	Antrim	2-13 - 1-09	Down	Casement Park, Belfast
	S Dennis 2-0, A McCloskey 0-6, C McCormack 0-5, S Collins 0-1, S Bailie 0-1.		J O'Connor 1-1, B Milligan 0-2, M Coulter 0-2, J McGrattan 0-1, B Braniff 0-1, J Crawford 0-1, D Burns 0-1.	Referee: P Aherne (Carlow)

=== All-Ireland Minor Hurling Championship ===
Semi-finals

8 August 1993 Semi-final	Galway	3-10 - 0-10	Tipperary	Cusack Park, Dublin
	D Coen 0-7, D Walsh 2-0, S Corcoran 1-1, M Conroy 0-1, M Lynskey 0-1.		J Enright 0-5, B Horgan 0-1, A Moloney 0-1, T Dunne 0-1, P Croke 0-1, D O'Meara 0-1.	Referee: S O'Meara (Offaly)

8 August 1993 Semi-final	Kilkenny	5-21 - 1-05	Antrim	Croke Park, Dublin
	O O'Connor 2-10, K Grogan 0-5, D Cleere 1-1, B Dalton 1-1, D Buddy 1-0, E Mackey 0-2, S Kealy 0-1, S Smith 0-1.		A McCloskey 1-2, A Mort 0-1, S Baille 0-1, S Dennis 0-1.	Referee: G Harrington (Cork)

Final

5 September 1993 Final	Kilkenny	1-17 - 1-12	Galway	Croke Park, Dublin
	D Buggy 1-3, O O'Connor 0-6, D Cleere 0-4, E Mackey 0-2, B Dalton 0-1, K Grogan 0-1.		D Coen 0-9, D Walsh 1-0, O Fahy 0-1, O Canning 0-1, S Walsh 0-1.	Referee: S McMahon (Clare)

== Championship statistics ==
=== Top scorers ===
Top scorers overall

Rank	Player	Club	Tally	Total	Matches	Average
1	Ollie O'Connor	Kilkenny	5-35	50	6	8.33
2	Johnny Enright	Tipperary	1-24	27	4	6.75
3	Martin Coulter	Down	4-09	21	2	10.50
3	Damien Cleere	Kilkenny	3-12	21	6	3.50
4	David Buggy	Kilkenny	4-06	18	6	3.00
5	Eoin Coleman	Cork	0-17	17	3	5.66
6	Darragh Coen	Galway	0-16	16	2	8.00
7	Brendan Dalton	Kilkenny	3-07	16	6	2.66
8	Seánie McGrath	Cork	2-07	13	3	4.33
8	Kevin O'Donoghue	Dublin	1-10	13	2	6.50
