= 2003 All-Ireland Senior Club Hurling Championship final =

2003 All-Ireland Senior Club Hurling Championship Final
- Event: 2002–03 All-Ireland Senior Club Hurling Championship
Dunloy	Birr
0-11	1-19
- Date: 17 March 2003
- Venue: Croke Park, Dublin
- Man of the Match: Barry Whelahan
- Referee: Seán McMahon (Clare)
- Attendance: 26,235

The 2003 All-Ireland Senior Club Hurling Championship final was a hurling match played at Croke Park on 17 March 2003 to determine the winners of the 2002–03 All-Ireland Senior Club Hurling Championship, the 33rd season of the All-Ireland Senior Club Hurling Championship, a tournament organised by the Gaelic Athletic Association for the champion clubs of the four provinces of Ireland. The final was contested by Dunloy of Antrim and Birr of Offaly, with Birr winning by 1-19 to 0-11.

The All-Ireland final was the fourth championship meeting between Birr and Dunloy. The Offalymen were hoping to make history by winning a record-breaking fourth All-Ireland title, while Dunloy were hoping to claim their first All-Ireland title in their third appearance in a final.

In a game that never ignited, Declan Pilkington gave Birr a lead after two minutes just by latching onto a long Brian Whelahan free and turning it over the bar. The Dunloy defence was working hard, however, Pilkington, Simon Whelahan, Paul Molloy and the Hanniffy brothers Rory and Gary all struck for points.

In the 24th minute Dunloy's Nigel Elliott made a great catch before offloading to his brother Ally who found himself in open space less than 20 metres out. The referee Sean McMahon blew for a free and play was called back for a foul on Nigel Elliott. A pointed free resulted as Dunloy were denied an almost certain goal. Before the break, Birr tacked on three more points, all from the hurley of Simon Whelehan, to take a reasonable five-point lead at the interval.

Dunloy set about reducing the deficit after the restart with two drilled frees from Gregory O'Kane bringing them within three, however, that was as close as Dunloy got. Birr gradually imposed their will on the game and the points came more readily. Simon Whelehan had four from frees, Declan Pilkington, Molloy, the two Hanniffys again and impressive sub Stephen Browne with a brace crushed the effort of Dunloy. In the 56th minute Birr were leading by 0-17 to 0-10 when they pounced for a goal. A long Brian Whelahan free hopped off Dunloy 'keeper Gareth McGhee's hand onto the crossbar and rebounded before an alert Declan Pilkington sent it to the net to kill the game.

Birr's All-Ireland victory was their second in succession, thus becoming the third team ever to retain the title. The win gave them their fourth All-Ireland title over all and put them as outright leaders on the all-time roll of honour.

== Match ==
=== Details ===
17 March 2003

Birr	1-19 - 0-11	Dunloy
S Whelahan (0-8, 7f), D Pilkington (1-2), R Hanniffy (0-2), G Hanniffy (0-2), P Molloy (0-2), S Browne (0-2), Brian Whelahan (0-1, f).		Greg O'Kane (0-5, 4f), A Elliot (0-3, 1f), P Richmond (0-2), M Curry (0-1).

Croke Park, Dublin
Attendance: 26,235
Referee: S McMahon (Clare)

Birr	Dunloy
