= Kieran Morrison =

Kieran Morrison may refer to:

- Kieran Morrison (hurler) (born 1975), Irish hurler
- Kieran Morrison (footballer) (born 2006), Northern Irish footballer
