= 2010 All-Ireland Intermediate Hurling Championship =

Championship Details
- Dates: 30 May 2010 – 28 August 2010
- Teams: 9

All Ireland Champions
- Winners: Kilkenny (3rd win)
- Captain: Bill Beckett
- Manager: Pat Hoban

All Ireland Runners-up
- Runners-up: Cork
- Captain: Mark Harrington
- Manager: Pat Kenneally

Provincial Champions
- Munster: Cork
- Leinster: Kilkenny
- Ulster: Not Played
- Connacht: Not Played

Championship Statistics
- Matches Played: 8
- Total Goals: 14 (1.75 per game)
- Total Points: 247 (30.875 per game)
- Top Scorer: Eoin Conway (1-32)

The 2010 All-Ireland Intermediate Hurling Championship was the 27th staging of the All-Ireland hurling championship since its establishment by the Gaelic Athletic Association in 1961. The championship began on 30 May 2010 and ended on 28 August 2010.

Cork were the defending champions, however, they were defeated by Kilkenny who won the title following a 2-17 to 1-13 victory in the final.

== Team summaries ==
Team	Colours	Most recent success	
Team	Colours	All-Ireland	Provincial
Clare	Saffron and blue		
Cork	Red and white	2009	2009
Dublin	Blue and navy		1972
Galway	Maroon and white	2002	2008
Kilkenny	Black and amber	2008	2009
Limerick	Green and white	1998	2008
Tipperary	Blue and gold	2000	2002
Waterford	White and blue		2007
Wexford	Purple and gold	2007	2007

== Results ==
=== Leinster Intermediate Hurling Championship ===
16 June 2010 Semi-final	Wexford	0-13 - 2-16	Kilkenny	Wexford Park
	E Quigley (0-4), E Moore (0-3, 2f), T Dwyer (0-3, 2f), J Roche (0-1, 1f), J Gahan (0-1), J O'Connor (0-1).	Report	E Guinan (0-9, 6f), B Beckett (2-2), R Dollard (0-2), P Cleere (0-1), N Walsh (0-1).

7 July 2010 Final	Kilkenny	1-21 - 0-11	Dublin	Nowlan Park
	E Guinan 0-8 (0-3 frees ), B Beckett 1-3, M Grace, P Cleere, and P Hogan (0-1 ’65 ) 0-2 each, P Hartley, N Walsh, A Healy and N Doherty 0-1 each.	Report	C Brennan 0-4, S McLoughlin 0-2, J Kelly 0-2, P Garbutt 0-1, G Bennett 0-1, K Warren 0-1.	Attendance: D Hughes (Carlow)

=== Munster Intermediate Hurling Championship ===
30 May 2010 Quarter-final	Cork	1-18 - 1-12	Tipperary	Páirc Uí Chaoimh
14:00	E Conway (0-8, six frees), M OSullivan (1-2), D O'Callaghan (0-2 frees), B Fitzgerald (0-2), J Halbert (0-2), B Corry (0-1), M Harrington (0-1).	Report	C Dillon (1-3, two frees), S Carey (0-4, three frees), M Dunne (0-2), R Sherlock (0-1), W O’Dwyer (0-1), P Murnane (0-1).	Referee: S McMahon (Clare)

7 June 2010 Quarter-final	Waterford	1-13 - 0-13	Clare	Semple Stadium
13:00	M Gorman 0-5 (3f), N Jacob 1-1, J Kearney, D Murphy & C O’Gorman 0-2 each, J Hurney 0-1.	Report	S Chaplin 0-6 (5f), M Duggan 0-3, P Hickey & P O’Connor (1f) 0-2 each.	Referee: N Cosgrove (Tipperary)

20 June 2010 Semi-final	Cork	1-24 - 3-17 (aet)	Limerick	Páirc Uí Chaoimh
14:00	E Conway 1-12 (0-8f, 0-1 ‘65), M Harrington 0-5, B Corry, D O’Callaghan 0-2 each, J Halbert, C Casey, M O’Sullivan 0-1 each.	Report	M Noonan 0-7 (0-7f), T Quaid 1-1, L Costello, T Crawford 1-0 each, D Hanley, R McCarthy (0-2f), P Leahy 0-2 each, T O’Brien, P Harty, G Murphy 0-1 each.	Referee: S Roche (Tipperary)

22 July 2010 Final	Waterford	0-13 - 0-15	Cork	Fraher Field
19:30	M Gorman 0-5 (0-5f), J Kearney, N Jacob 0-2 each, P Hurney, T Connors, B Phelan, T Ryan 0-1 each.	Report	E Conway 0-5 (0-4f, 0-1 ’65’), B Cooper, M O’Sullivan, D O’Callaghan(0-1f) 0-2 each, B Lawton, B Fitzgerald, M Harrington, J Halbert 0-1 each.	Referee: M O'Connor (Limerick)

=== All-Ireland Intermediate Hurling Championship ===
14 August 2010 Semi-final	Galway	0-10 - 0-24	Kilkenny	O'Connor Park
	B Murphy (0-6, 4f, 1 '65'), M Coughlan (0-1), G McInerney (0-1), J Regan (0-1), A Carey (0-1).	Report	E Guinan (0-11, 4f), B Beckett (0-4), P Hogan (0-2, 2f), R Dollard (0-2), N Cleere (0-2), N Doherty (0-1), P Hartley (0-1), N Walsh (0-1).	Referee: D O'Driscoll (Limerick)

28 August 2010 Final	Cork	1-13 - 2-17	Kilkenny	Semple Stadium
19:00	E Conway (0-7, all frees), C Casey (1-1), B Cooper (0-3), D O’Callaghan (0-2, frees).	Report	P Cleere (2-0), B Beckett (0-4, one free), A Healy (0-4, three frees), M Grace (0-2), R Dollard (0-2), N Cleere (0-1, free), B Lennon (0-1), N Walsh (0-1), K Mooney (0-1, free), N Doherty (0-1).	Referee: A Kelly (Galway)

== Statistics ==
=== Top scorers ===
Overall

Rank	Player	County	Tally	Total	Matches	Average
1	Eoin Conway	Cork	1-32	35	4	8.75
2	Eoin Guinan	Kilkenny	0-28	28	3	9.33
3	Billy Beckett	Kilkenny	3-13	22	4	5.50

Single game

Rank	Player	County	Tally	Total	Opposition
1	Eoin Conway	Cork	1-12	15	Limerick
2	Eoin Guinan	Kilkenny	0-11	11	Galway
3	Eoin Guinan	Kilkenny	0-9	9	Wexford
4	Billy Beckett	Kilkenny	2-2	8	Wexford
4	Eoin Guinan	Kilkenny	0-8	8	Dublin
4	Eoin Conway	Cork	0-8	8	Tipperary
7	Eoin Conway	Cork	0-7	7	Kilkenny
7	Michael Noonan	Limerick	0-7	7	Cork
9	Peter Cleere	Kilkenny	2-0	6	Cork
9	Billy Beckett	Kilkenny	1-3	6	Dublin
9	Cathal Dillon	Tipperary	1-3	6	Cork
9	Seán Chaplin	Clare	0-6	6	Waterford
9	Brian Murphy	Galway	0-6	6	Kilkenny
