= 2009 Kilkenny Intermediate Hurling Championship =

- Dates: 19 September – 18 October 2009
- Teams: 12
- Sponsor: Michael Lyng Motors
- Champions: St Lachtain's (2nd title); Eoin Guinan (captain); Gordon Ryan (manager)
- Runners-up: Dicksboro; Sam Morrissey (captain)
- Relegated: Thomastown

Tournament statistics
- Matches played: 15
- Goals scored: 34 (2.27 per match)
- Points scored: 382 (25.47 per match)
- Top scorer(s): Eddie O'Donoghue (0-31)

The 2009 Kilkenny Intermediate Hurling Championship was the 45th staging of the Kilkenny Intermediate Hurling Championship since its establishment by the Kilkenny County Board in 1929. The championship ran from 19 September to 18 October 2009.

The final was played on 18 October 2009 at Nowlan Park in Kilkenny, between St Lachtain's and Dicksboro, in what was their first ever meeting in the final. St Lachtain's won the match by 0–16 to 1–11 to claim their second championship title overall and a first championship title in 25 years.

== Results ==
=== First round ===
19 September 2009 First round	Tullogher-Rosbercon	3-19 - 1-14	Thomastown	Mullinavat Grounds
	L Barron 0-9, E Cullinane 2-0, E Mullally 1-0, J Cottrell 0-3, S Ryan 0-2, J Barron 0-2, M Cottrell 0-1, W Walsh 0-1, T Healy 0-1.		S Waugh 0-7, P Treacy 1-2, R O'Hara 0-2, JJ Farrell 0-2, S Lanigan 0-1.

19 September 2009 First round	Emeralds	2-10 - 0-11	Graignamanagh	Nowlan Park
	B Campion 1-1, I Grant 0-3, A Fogarty 1-0, D Lyng 0-2, E Ryan 0-2, F Clohessy 0-1, A Cleere 0-1.		P Whelan 0-4, G Dowling 0-3, E Walsh 0-2, E Dowling 0-1, B Foley 0-1.

19 September 2009 First round	Mooncoin	1-13 - 1-10	Mullinavat	Piltown Grounds
	D Mackey 1-6, K Kirwan 0-2, T Kearns 0-2, PJ Rowe 0-2, M Grace 0-1.		M Murphy 0-5, W O'Dwyer 1-1, N Anthony 0-2, W Burke 0-1, P Aylward 0-1.

20 September 2009 First round	Glenmore	0-10 - 0-10	Conahy Shamrocks	Páirc Dhroichead Binéid
	E Murphy 0-6, K Cottrell 0-2, M Phelan 0-1, J Aylward 0-1.		J Wallace 0-2, G Nolan 0-2, D Healy 0-2, A Healy 0-2, M Lalor 0-2.

26 September 2009 First round replay	Glenmore	4-10 - 3-16	Conahy Shamrocks	Páirc Dhroichead Binéid
	E Murphy 3-6, J Cody 1-0, G Aylward 0-2, J Aylward 0-1, M Phelan 0-1.		A Healy 0-11, G Nolan 2-1, P Dollard 1-0, M Lawlor 0-2, D Buggy 0-1, J Wallace 0-1.

=== Relegation playoff ===
10 October 2009 Playoff	Graignamanagh	1-11 - 1-11	Thomastown	Gowran Grounds
	E Walsh 0-8, S O'Brien 1-0, J Bolger 0-1, E Dowling 0-1, G Dowling 0-1.		J Hanrahan 1-2, S Waugh 0-3, JJ Farrell 0-2, R O'Hara 0-2, D Brennan 0-1, P Treacy 0-1.

17 October 2009 Playoff replay	Graignamanagh	1-15 - 1-06	Thomastown	Gowran Grounds
	E Walsh 0-10, P Whelan 1-0, C Dunne 0-2, E Dowling 0-1, G Dowling 0-1, S O'Brien 0-1.		M Mahony 1-0, R O'Hara 0-2, D Waugh 0-2, D Lanigan 0-2.

=== Quarter-finals ===
26 September 2009 Quarter-final	Mooncoin	0-17 - 1-09	Danesfort	Páirc na Seamróg
	D Mackey 0-5, R Wall 0-3, K Kirwan 0-3, PJ Rowe 0-2, M Grace 0-1, T Kearns 0-1, E Hennebry 0-1, E Mackey 0-1.		R Hogan 0-6, P Murphy 1-0, D Forristal 0-1, R Walsh 0-1, A Dunne 0-1.

27 September 2009 Quarter-final	St Lachtain's	0-18 - 0-13	Emeralds	St Patrick's Park
	E Guinan 0-12, B Beckett 0-4, N McGree 0-1, D Brennan 0-1.		E Ryan 0-5, E Kavanagh 0-3, R Moriarty 0-2, A Fogarty 0-1, K Rafter 0-1, I Grant 0-1.

27 September 2009 Quarter-final	Dicksboro	1-18 - 2-15	Tullogher-Rosbercon	Thomastown Grounds
	E O'Donoghue 0-10, P O'Flynn 1-2, S Maher 0-2, A Stapleton 0-2, K Starr 0-1, T Manning 0-1.		L Barron 0-7, E Cullinane 1-2, J Barron 1-1, P Hartley 0-3, J Cottrell 0-1, W Walsh 0-1.

3 October 2009 Quarter-final replay	Dicksboro	2-17 - 2-09	Tullogher-Rosbercon	Thomastown Grounds
	E O'Donoghue 0-8, S Maher 1-3, A Stapleton 1-2, P O'Flynn 0-3, K Starr 0-1.		E Mullally 1-2, E Cullinane 1-0, J Barron 0-3, L Barron 0-1, P Hartley 0-1, W Walsh 0-1, S Ryan 0-1.

3 October 2009 Quarter-final	Rower-Inistioge	1-15 - 0-10	Conahy Shamrocks	Nowlan Park
	P Sheehan 0-7, P Tierney 1-1, M Grace 0-2, J Cashin 0-2, JJ Kenny 0-1, E Kavanagh 0-1, M Doyle 0-1.		A Healy 0-5, D Buggy 0-3, M Lawlor 0-2.

=== Semi-finals ===
4 October 2010 Semi-final	St Lachtain's	2-11 - 1-07	Mooncoin	Nowlan Park
	E Guinan 0-8, B Beckett 1-2, J Fitzpatrick 1-0, N Hickey 0-1.		R Wall 0-3, K Kirwan 1-0, E Hennebry 0-2, T O'Hanlon 0-1, D Mackey 0-1.

11 October 2010 Semi-final	Dicksboro	0-20 - 2-10	Rower-Inistioge	Nowlan Park
	E O'Donoghue 0-12, A Stapleton 0-2, P O'Flynn 0-2, M Fagan 0-1, S Maher 0-1, T Manning 0-1, C Starr 0-1.		P Sheehan 0-6, JJ Kenny 1-0, D Lyng 1-0, K Joyce 0-1, E Kavanagh 0-1, M Grace 0-1, P Tierney 0-1.

=== Final ===
18 October 2009 Final	St Lachtain's	0-16 - 1-11	Dicksboro	Nowlan Park
	E Guinan 0-8, J Fitzpatrick 0-3, B Beckett 0-2, J Costelloe 0-1, R Dowling 0-1, O O'Connor 0-1.		P O'Flynn 1-2, C Starr 0-3, A Stapleton 0-3, D O'Gorman 0-1, S Maher 0-1, E O'Donoghue 0-1.

== Championship statistics ==
=== Top scorers ===
Rank	Player	Club	Tally	Total	Matches	Average
1	Eddie O'Donoghue	Dicksboro	0-31	31	4	7.75
2	Eoin Guinan	St Lachtain's	0-28	28	3	9.33
3	Eoin Murphy	Glenmore	3-12	21	2	10.50
4	Eddie Walsh	Graignamanagh	0-20	20	3	6.66
5	Alan Healy	Conahy Shamrocks	0-18	18	3	6.00
6	Liam Barron	Tullogher-Rosbercon	0-17	17	3	5.66
7	Paul O'Flynn	Dicksboro	2-09	15	4	3.75
7	Diarmuid Mackey	Mooncoin	1-12	15	3	5.00
9	Edmund Cullinane	Tullogher-Rosbercon	4-02	14	3	4.66
10	Paul Sheehan	Rower-Inistioge	0-13	13	2	6.50
