= Tynagh-Abbey/Duniry GAA =

Gaelic sports club in County Galway, Ireland

Tynagh-Abbey/Duniry
- Tíne-Mainistir/Dún Doighre
- Founded: 2004
- County: Galway
- Nickname: TAD
- Colours: Blue and green
- Grounds: Duniry
- Coordinates: 53°07′54″N 8°24′29″W

Playing kits
Standard colours

Tynagh-Abbey/Duniry GAA is a Gaelic Athletic Association club based in the parish of Tynagh, County Galway, Ireland. The club is solely concerned with the game of hurling

== History ==
Hurling has been played in the area since the early days of the GAA when two separate clubs, Abbey and Duniry, were in existence. A club in Tynagh also existed. All three clubs operated as separate entities, however, they often combined in an effort to fields teams. Tynagh and Abbey/Duniry amalgamated at juvenile and underage levels as a result of a decline in population in those areas. This was followed by an amalgamation at adult level in 2004.

The Tynagh-Abbey/Duniry was just five years in existence when it claimed the Galway IHC title after a 1-20 to 1-16 defeat of Meelick-Eyrecourt in the final. This was followed by winning the Connacht Club IHC title. Tynagh-Abbey/Duniry added a second set of Galway and Connacht Club IHC titles to their collection in 2024.

== Honours ==
- Connacht Intermediate Club Hurling Championship (2): 2009, 2024
- Galway Intermediate Hurling Championship (2): 2009, 2024
- Galway Junior C1 Hurling Championship (1): 2011
- Galway Minor A Hurling Championship (1): 2011

Galway Junior B Hurling Championship (1) 2015

Galway U20 B Hurling Championship (1) 2023

== Notable players ==
- Kevin Broderick: All-Ireland U21HC-winner (1996)
- Paul Gordon: All-Ireland U21HC-winner (2011)
- Liam Hodgins: All-Ireland U21HC-winner (1996)
- Paul Killeen: Leinster SHC-winner (2017, 2018)
- Shane Moloney: All-Ireland SHC-winner (2017)
