= 2002 All-Ireland Senior Club Hurling Championship final =

2002 All-Ireland Senior Club Hurling Championship Final
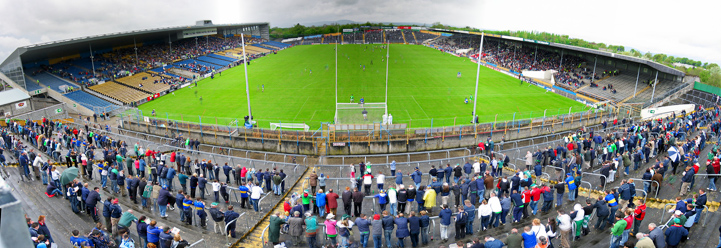
- Event: 2001–02 All-Ireland Senior Club Hurling Championship
| Birr | Clarinbridge |
| 2-10 | 1-5 |
- Date: 17 March 2002
- Venue: Semple Stadium, Thurles
- Man of the Match: Brian Whelahan
- Referee: Ger Harrington (Cork)
- Attendance: 16,112

The 2002 All-Ireland Senior Club Hurling Championship final was a hurling match played at Croke Park on 17 March 2002 to determine the winners of the 2001–02 All-Ireland Senior Club Hurling Championship, the 32nd season of the All-Ireland Senior Club Hurling Championship, a tournament organised by the Gaelic Athletic Association for the champion clubs of the four provinces of Ireland. The final was contested by Birr of Offaly and Clarinbridge of Galway, with Birr winning by 2–10 to 1–5.

The All-Ireland final was a unique occasion as it was the first ever championship meeting between Birr and Clarinbridge. It remains their only clash in the All-Ireland series. Birr hoping to claim a record-equalling third All-Ireland title, while first-time finalists Clarinbridge were hoping to win their first All-Ireland championship.

Birr made their intentions very clear from the very start when Declan Pilkington netted inside the opening minute, however, within ten minutes Clarinbridge had taken the lead after Darragh Coen converted a free and then corner forward David Donoghue took advantage of some poor defending from Birr to score a goal. Coen then exchanged points with brothers Brian and Simon Whelahan as very little separated the two clubs on a dull and dreary afternoon. As half-time approached Brian Whelahan missed a free to level matters and before the whistle sounded for the interval, the Galway club extended its lead to two points - 1–4 to 1–2 - when Donoghue fired over from wide on the left.

Within five minutes of the restart Birr had taken the lead after five quick points in succession from Gary Hanniffy, Rory Hanniffy, Stephen Browne and Brian and Simon Whelehan, leaving them firmly in the driving seat. Clarinbridge could only manage one point in total from their efforts in the second half and this arrived in the 44th minute when Coen successfully converted a free. On 50 minutes, with Birr now leading 1–9 to 1–5, Johnny Pilkington broke away and although his first effort to the net was saved by Liam Donoghue, he made no mistake with his second chance and kicked the sliotar over the line. A minute later Birr extended their advantage when Simon Whelahan fired a penalty over the bar. With time running out Clarinbrige needed to act fast if they were to make any fightback but Coen missed several vital frees in the dying minutes of the game.

== Match ==
=== Details ===
17 March 2002

| Birr | 2-10 - 1-5 | Clarinbridge |
|---|---|---|
| S Whelahan 0-4f, D Pilkington and J Pilkington 1-0 each, S Brown and G Hanniffy 0-2 each, R Hanniffy 0-1, Brian Whelahan 0-1f. | | D Donoghue 1-1, D Coen 0-4f. |

Croke Park, Dublin
Attendance: 16,112
Referee: G Harrington (Cork)

| Birr | Clarinbridge |
