= Peter Huban =

Irish hurler (born 1976)

Personal information
- Native name: Peadar Ó hÚbáin (Irish)
- Born: 5 July 1976 (age 50) Kinvara, County Galway, Ireland
- Height: 6 ft 3 in (191 cm)

Sport
- Sport: Hurling
- Position: Full-back
Club
- Years: Club
- Kinvara
Club titles
- Galway titles: 0
Inter-county*
Years	County	Apps (scores)
1999	Galway	1 (0-00)
Inter-county titles
- Connacht titles: 0
- All-Irelands: 0
- NHL: 0
- All Stars: 0
- *Inter County team apps and scores correct as of 23:00, 15 March 2015.

Peter Huban (born 5 July 1976) is an Irish retired hurler who played as a full-back for the Galway senior team.

Born in Kinvara, County Galway, Huban first played competitive hurling during his schooling at Our Lady's College in Gort. He arrived on the inter-county scene at the age of seventeen when he first linked up with the Galway minor team, before later joining the under-21 side. He made his senior debut during the 1999 championship. Huban enjoyed a brief career with Galway and ended his career without silverware.

At the international level, Huban has played for the composite rules shinty-hurling team at the under-21 level, captaining his country to the title in 1996. At the club level, he enjoyed a lengthy career with Kinvara.

Throughout his inter-county career, Huban made 1 championship appearance for Galway. His retirement came following the conclusion of the 1999 championship.

== Honours ==
=== Team ===
Our Lady's College

- Connacht Senior Colleges Hurling Championship (1): 1993

Galway

- All-Ireland Under-21 Hurling Championship (1): 1996 (c)
- All-Ireland Minor Hurling Championship (1): 1994

Ireland

- Composite Rules Under-21 Shinty–Hurling (1): 1996 (c)

Achievements
Preceded by Brian Horgan (Tipperary)	All-Ireland Under-21 Hurling Final winning captain 1996	Succeeded by Dan Murphy (Cork)
