= 1996 All-Ireland Under-21 Hurling Championship =

All-Ireland Under-21 Hurling Championship 1996
Championship Details
- Dates: 12 June 1996 – 10 September 1996
- Teams: 17

All Ireland Champions
- Winners: Galway (7th win)
- Captain: Peter Huban

All Ireland Runners-up
- Runners-up: Wexford
- Captain: Paul Codd

Provincial Champions
- Munster: Cork
- Leinster: Wexford
- Ulster: Antrim
- Connacht: Not Played

Championship Statistics
- Top Scorer: Joe Deane (4-09)

The 1996 All-Ireland Under-21 Hurling Championship was the 33rd staging of the All-Ireland Under-21 Hurling Championship since its establishment by the Gaelic Athletic Association in 1964. The championship began on 12 June 1996 and ended on 10 September 1996.

Tipperary entered the championship as the defending champions, however, they were beaten by Cork in the Munster semi-final.

On 10 September 1995, Galway won the championship following a 1-14 to 0-7 defeat of Wexford in the All-Ireland final. This was their 7th All-Ireland title overall and their first championship title since 1993.

Cork's Joe Deane was the championship's top scorer with 4-09.

== Results ==
=== Munster Under-21 Hurling Championship ===
Quarter-finals

19 June 1996 Quarter-final	Tipperary	0-16 - 0-10	Limerick	Semple Stadium, Thurles
	K Tucker 0-4, L Cahill 0-3, D O'Meara 0-2, D O'Connor 0-2, P Shelly 0-1, N Morris 0-1, T Dunne 0-1, P O'Dwyer 0-1, J Enright 0-1.		B Hartnett 0-5, B Tobin 0-2, P Neenan 0-2, M Foley 0-1.

21 June 1996 Quarter-final	Kerry	1-09 - 1-12	Waterford	Austin Stack Park, Tralee
	O Diggins 1-2, M Slattery 0-4, P Cronin 0-1, WJ Leen 0-1, J Carroll 0-1.		B Walsh 1-2, K McGrath 0-4, M White 0-2, T Carroll 0-2, D Bennett 0-2.

Semi-finals

10 July 1996 Semi-final	Clare	3-15 - 3-14	Waterford	Semple Stadium, Thurles
	E Taaffe 1-5, M Conlon 1-1, B Murphy 1-1, N Gilligan 0-4, D Forde 0-2, D Scanlon 0-1, C Shannon 0-1.		T Carroll 2-1, D Shanahan 1-2, D Bennett 0-5, M White 0-2, K McGrath 0-2, D McGrath 0-1, M Murray 0-1,	Referee: J McDonald (Tipperary)

18 July 1996 Semi-final	Cork	2-18 - 1-12	Tipperary	Páirc Uí Chaoimh, Cork
	J Deane 2-4, A Cummins 0-4, S McGrath 0-3, D Ronan 0-2, M O'Connell 0-2, K Egan 0-1, J Sheehan 0-1, K Morrison 0-1.		P O'Dwyer 1-2, K Tucker 0-4, J Enright 0-3, D O'Meara 0-1, D O'Connor 0-1, L Cahill 0-1.	Referee: P O'Connor (Limerick)

Final

25 July 1996 Final	Cork	3-16 - 2-07	Clare	Semple Stadium, Thurles
	J Deane 2-5, B O'Driscoll 1-1, M O'Connell 0-4, K Egan 0-2, A Cummins 0-2, D Scanlon 0-1, C Buckley 0-1.		N Gilligan 1-2, E Murphy 1-0, D Forde 0-2, E Taaffe 0-2, D Scanlon 0-1.	Referee: W Barrett (Tipperary)

=== Leinster Under-21 Hurling Championship ===
Quarter-finals

12 June 1996 Quarter-final	Carlow	1-10 - 3-13	Kilkenny	Bagenalstown
	P Coady 0-8, G Doyle 1-0, R Foley 0-1, D Byrne 0-1.		O O'Connor 3-2, D Cleere 0-4, O Behan 0-2, J Costello 0-2, K O'Shea 0-1, N Moloney 0-1, D Buggy 0-1.	Referee: R Maher (Dublin)

12 June 1996 Quarter-final	Offaly	3-09 - 1-15	Dublin	O'Connor Park, Tullamore
	J Kelly 2-4, S Whelehan 1-0, S Hand 0-2, P Mulhaire 0-2, R Martin 0-1.		K Flynn 1-5, L Donoghue 0-6, K Meehan 0-2, G Ennis 0-1, K Donoghue 0-1.	Referee: D Murphy (Wexford)

25 June 1996 Quarter-final replay	Dublin	0-08 - 2-10	Offaly	Parnell Park, Dublin
	K Flynn 0-5, S Byrne 0-1, S Cooke 0-1, K Donoghue 0-1.		G Hanniffy 2-3, J Kelly 0-4, S Whelehan 0-1, P Mulhaire 0-1, K Farrell 0-1.	Referee: D Murphy (Wexford)

Semi-finals

3 July 1996 Semi-final	Laois	0-03 - 1-10	Offaly	O'Moore Park, Portlaoise
	D Cuddy 0-2, A Townsend 0-1.		G Hanniffy 1-0, S Hand 0-2, K Farrell 0-2, S Whelehan 0-2, J Doughan 0-1, J Kelly 0-1, A Mannion 0-1, D Gleeson 0-1.	Referee: P Neary (Kilkenny)

3 July 1996 Semi-final	Kilkenny	2-11 - 1-14	Wexford	Nowlan Park, Kilkenny
	D Cleere 1-5, D Buggy 1-0, K O'Shea 0-2, L Behan 0-2, N Moloney 0-1, J Costelloe 0-1.		D Kent 1-0, R McCarthy 0-3, L Cullen 0-3, M Byrne 0-2, M Jordan 0-2, M O'Leary 0-1, S Colfer 0-1, D O'Connor 0-1, G Laffan 0-1.	Referee: P Horan (Offaly)

19 July 1996 Semi-final replay	Wexford	2-09 - 1-15	Kilkenny	Wexford Park, Wexford
	D Cleere 1-5, O O'Connor 1-0, E Behan 0-1, L Smyth 0-1, R Moore 0-1, K O'Shea 0-1.		E Cullen 0-4, N Sheil 1-0, D Ruth 0-2, R McCarthy 0-2, G Laffan 0-2, M O'Leary 0-1, S Colfer 0-1, M Byrne 0-1, M Jordan 0-1, J Lawlor 0-1.	Referee: P Horan (Offaly)

Final

27 July 1996 Final	Wexford	1-09 - 0-12	Offaly	Dr. Cullen Park, Carlow
	J Lawlor 1-0, M Jordan 0-3, G Laffan 0-2, M Byrne 0-2, E Cullen 0-1, PJ Carley 0-1.		J Kelly 0-5, R Martin 0-2, P Mulhaire 0-1, D Gleeson 0-1, S Hand 0-1, A Mannion 0-1, K Farrell 0-1.	Referee: P Neary (Kilkenny)

10 August 1996 Final	Wexford	2-16 - 2-05	Offaly	Dr. Cullen Park, Carlow
	G Laffan 1-5, J Lawlor 1-1, M Jordan 0-4, E Cullen 0-3, S Colfer 0-1, R McCarthy 0-1, P Codd 0-1.		D Gleeson 1-2, C Cassidy 1-0, K Farrell 0-2, S Whelehan 0-1.	Attendance: 7,000; Referee: P Neary (Kilkenny)

=== Ulster Under-21 Hurling Championship ===
Semi-finals

29 June 1996 Semi-final	Down	4-12 - 2-08	Derry	McKenna Park, Ballycran
	M Coulter 3-7, B Coleman 1-0, J McGrattan 0-2, B Milligan 0-1, B Braniff 0-1, G Gordon 0-1.		G Biggs 2-8,	Referee: T McIntyre (Antrim)

29 June 1996 Semi-final	Armagh	0-04 - 3-14	Antrim	Keady
	N Gordon 0-2, R Murray 0-1, M Scanlon 0-1.		C McCormack 1-3, A Gallagher 1-2, B McFall 1-1, B O'Hara 0-4, A Mort 0-3, P McShane 0-1.	Referee: HP McCusker (Down)

Final

20 July 1996 Final	Antrim	1-13 - 1-12	Down	McKenna Park, Ballycran
	J McGrattan 1-4, M Coulter 0-2, B Braniff 0-2, J Adair 0-1, C McGrattan 0-1, B Milligan 0-1, K Savage 0-1.		A McCloskey 0-7, A Delargy 1-3, M Molloy 0-2, S Collins 0-1.

=== All-Ireland Under-21 Hurling Championship ===
Semi-finals

17 August 1996 Semi-final	Wexford	3-14 - 1-06	Antrim	Parnell Park, Dublin
	P Codd 1-6, M Jordan 1-2, S Colfer 1-2, D O'Connor 0-2, J Lawlor 0-1, M Byrne 0-1.		C Stewart 1-0, L Redmond 0-3, M Molloy 0-2, A Delargy 0-1.	Referee: J Cooney (Galway)

17 August 1996 Semi-final	Galway	1-13 - 1-09	Cork	Cusack Park, Ennis
	D Coen 1-8, F Healy 0-2, D Moran 0-2, V Maher 0-1.		S McGrath 1-3, M O'Connell 0-4, K Egan 0-2.	Attendance: 8,000; Referee: P Delaney (Laois)

Final

8 September 1996 Final	Galway	1-14 - 0-07	Wexford	Semple Stadium, Thurles
	K Broderick 1-2, A Kerins 0-4, D Coen 0-4, D Moran 0-2, C Moore 0-1, F Healy 0-1.		P Codd 0-5, G Laffan 0-2.	Attendance: 35,315; Referee: P O'Connor (Limerick)

== Championship statistics ==
=== Top scorers ===
Top scorers overall

Rank	Player	Club	Tally	Total	Matches	Average
1	Joe Deane	Cork	4-09	21	3	7.00
2	John Kelly	Offaly	2-14	20	4	5.00
2	Damien Cleere	Kilkenny	2-14	20	3	6.66
3	Martin Coulter	Down	3-09	18	2	9.00
4	Darragh Coen	Galway	1-12	15	2	7.50
4	Paul Codd	Wexford	1-12	15	6	2.50
4	Gary Laffan	Wexford	1-12	15	6	2.50
4	Michael Jordan	Wexford	1-12	15	6	2.50
5	Ollie O'Connor	Kilkenny	4-02	14	3	4.66
5	Gary Biggs	Derry	2-08	14	1	14.00
