= Jack Redmond (hurler) =

Irish hurler

Personal information
- Native name: Seán Mac Réamoinn (Irish)
- Born: 2003 (age 22–23) Rathnure, County Wexford, Ireland

Sport
- Sport: Hurling
- Position: Full-forward
Club
- Years: Club
- 2001-present: Rathnure
Club titles
- Wexford titles: 0
Inter-county
- Years: County
- 2025-present: Wexford
Inter-county titles
- Leinster titles: 0
- All-Irelands: 0
- NHL: 0
- All Stars: 0

Jack Redmond (born 2003) is an Irish hurler. At club level he plays with Rathnure and at inter-county level with the Wexford senior hurling team.

== Career ==
Born in Rathnure, County Wexford, Redmond attended Good Counsel College in Wexford and lined out in all grades of hurling during his time there. He won a Leinster PPS SAHC medal in 2022, following a 1–23 to 0–14 win over Dublin South in the final.

At club level, Redmond first played for Rathnure at juvenile and underage levels before progressing to adult level in 2021. He was part of the Rathnure team that beat St James's by 0–25 to 0–20 to win the Wexford IHC in 2024. Redmond subsequently claimed a Leinster Club IHC medal after beating Lisdowney in the final.

Redmond first appeared on the inter-county scene for Wexford during a two-year tenure with the under-20 team in 2022 and 2023. He made his senior team debut in a National Hurling League game against Cork in January 2025.

== Honours ==
Good Counsel College

- Leinster PPS Senior A Hurling Championship (1): 2022

Rathnure

- Leinster Intermediate Club Hurling Championship (1): 2024
- Wexford Intermediate Hurling Championship (1): 2024
