= Paul Killeen (hurler) =

Irish hurler

Personal information
- Native name: Pól Ó Cillín (Irish)
- Born: 24 June 1994 (age 32) Tynagh, County Galway, Ireland
- Height: 1.83 m (6 ft 0 in)

Sport
- Sport: Hurling
- Position: Left corner-back
Club
- Years: Club
- 2011-present: Tynagh-Abbey/Duniry
Club titles
- Galway titles: 0
College
- Years: College
- 2013-2017: Limerick Institute of Technology
College titles
- Fitzgibbon titles: 0
Inter-county*
Years	County	Apps (scores)
2014-present	Galway	11 (0-01)
Inter-county titles
- Leinster titles: 2
- All-Irelands: 0
- NHL: 1
- All Stars: 0
- *Inter County team apps and scores correct as of 16:53, 4 January 2019.

Paul Killeen (born 24 June 1994) is an Irish hurler who plays as a right corner-back for club side Tynagh-Abbey/Duniry and at inter-county level with the Galway senior hurling team.

== Playing career ==
=== College ===
Killeen first came to prominence as a hurler with Portumna Community School. After playing in every grade of hurling during his tenure there, he eventually played in the Connacht Championship with the senior team.

=== University ===
As a student at the Limerick Institute of Technology, Killeen was a regular player on the university's senior hurling team in the Fitzgibbon Cup.

=== Club ===
Killeen joined the Tynagh-Abbey/Duniry club at a young age and played in all grades at juvenile and underage levels before joining the club's top adult team.

=== Inter-county ===
==== Minor and under-21 ====
Killeen first played for Galway as a member of the minor hurling team on 23 July 2011. He made his first appearance in an 8–26 to 0-12 All-Ireland quarter-final defeat of Antrim at Parnell Park. On 4 September 2011, Killeen was at full-back for Galway's 1–21 to 1–12 defeat of Dublin in the All-Ireland final at Croke Park.

Killeen was appointed captain of the Galway minor team in his second and final season. On 19 August 2012, he was red-carded in the 45th minute of an All-Ireland semi-final meeting with Tipperary.

As a member of the Galway under-21 hurling team, Killeen made his first appearance on 24 August 2013 in a 1–16 to 0-07 All-Ireland semi-final defeat by Clare.

==== Senior ====
Killeen made his debut for the Galway senior team on 9 March 2014 in a 2–16 to 1-16 National Hurling League defeat by Kilkenny. He later made his first championship start on 1 June 2014 in a 1–22 to 0–23 defeat of Laois.

On 6 September 2015, Killeen was an unused substitute for Galway's 1–22 to 1–18 defeat by Kilkenny in the All-Ireland final.

On 23 April 2017, Killeen was at left corner-back when Galway defeated Tipperary by 3–21 to 0–14 to win the National Hurling League. In Galway's opening Leinster Championship against Dublin on 28 May 2017, Killeen suffered a cruciate knee injury while ended his season.

On 8 July 2018, Killeen won a Leinster Championship medal following Galway's 1–28 to 3–15 defeat of Kilkenny in the final replay. In the subsequent All-Ireland final against Limerick on 19 August, Killeen started the game on the bench but was introduced as a replacement for John Hanbury. Galway were beaten by 3–16 to 2–18.

== Career statistics ==
As of match played 19 August 2018.

Team	Year	National League			Leinstser		All-Ireland		Total	
Team	Year	Division	Apps	Score	Apps	Score	Apps	Score	Apps	Score
Galway	2014	Division 1A	3	0-00	2	0-01	0	0-00	5	0-01
Galway	2015	Division 1A	3	0-00	1	0-00	0	0-00	4	0-00
Galway	2016	Division 1A	0	0-00	1	0-00	0	0-00	1	0-00
Galway	2017	Division 1B	7	0-01	1	0-00	—		8	0-01
Galway	2018	Division 1B	0	0-00	3	0-00	3	0-00	6	0-00
Total			13	0-01	8	0-01	3	0-00	24	0-02

== Honours ==
Galway

- Leinster Senior Hurling Championship (2): 2017, 2018
- National Hurling League Division 1 (1): 2017
- All-Ireland Minor Hurling Championship (1): 2011

Sporting positions
Preceded by Shane Moloney	Galway minor hurling team captain 2012	Succeeded by Darragh Dolan
