= Kieran Morrison (hurler) =

Irish hurler (born 1975)

Personal information
- Native name: Ciarán Ó Muireasáin (Irish)
- Born: 1975 (age 50–51) Conna, County Cork, Ireland
- Occupation: Global service lead for EMC
- Height: 6 ft 0 in (183 cm)

Sport
- Sport: Hurling
- Position: Full-forward
Club
- Years: Club
- 1994-2008: St Catherine's
Club titles
- Cork titles: 0
College
- Years: College
- University College Cork
College titles
- Fitzgibbon titles: 3
Inter-county*
Years	County	Apps (scores)
1995-1999	Cork	4 (0-00)
Inter-county titles
- Munster titles: 0
- All-Irelands: 1
- NHL: 1
- All Stars: 0
- *Inter County team apps and scores correct as of 01:51, 29 July 2014.

Kieran Morrison (born 1975) is an Irish retired hurler who played as a full-forward for the Cork senior team.

Born in Conna, County Cork, Morrison first arrived on the inter-county scene at the age of seventeen when he first linked up with the Cork minor team, before later joining the under-21 side. He made his senior debut during the 1995 championship. Morrisson had a brief career, winning one National Hurling League medal. He also won a set of All-Ireland and Munster medals as a non-playing substitute.

At club level Morrison played Senior Club Hurling with St Catherine's for 14 years (1994-2008) and is a two-time intermediate championship medallist with St Catherine's.

== Career statistics ==
=== Club ===
Team	Season	Cork SHC	
Team	Season	Apps	Score
St. Catherine's	1995	1	2-00
St. Catherine's	1996	2	0-03
St. Catherine's	1997	2	1-02
St. Catherine's	1998	2	0-06
St. Catherine's	1999	2	1-05
St. Catherine's	2000	2	0-04
St. Catherine's	2001	x	0-03
St. Catherine's	2002	x	0-01
St. Catherine's	2003	x	0-02

== Honours ==
=== Team ===
University College Cork

- Fitzgibbon Cup (1): 1996, 1997 (captain), 1998

St Catherine's

- Cork Intermediate Hurling Championship (1): 1994, 2004

Cork

- All-Ireland Senior Hurling Championship (1): 1999 (sub)
- Munster Senior Hurling Championship (1): 1999 (sub)
- National Hurling League (1): 1998
- Munster Under-21 Hurling Championship (1): 1996
- Munster Intermediate Hurling Championship (1): 2005
- All-Ireland Junior Hurling Championship (1): 1994

Achievements
Preceded by Frank Lohan	Fitzgibbon Cup Final winning captain 1997	Succeeded by Eddie Enright
