= 1999 All-Ireland Intermediate Hurling Championship =

Championship Details
- Dates: 30 May – 25 September 1999
- Teams: 12

All Ireland Champions
- Winners: Galway (1st win)
- Captain: Noel Larkin
- Manager: Micheál Linnane

All Ireland Runners-up
- Runners-up: Kilkenny
- Captain: Robert Shortall
- Manager: Noel Skehan

Provincial Champions
- Munster: Cork
- Leinster: Kilkenny
- Ulster: Not Played
- Connacht: Not Played

Championship Statistics
- Matches Played: 11
- Total Goals: 28 (2.54 per game)
- Total Points: 266 (24.18 per game)
- Top Scorer: Ollie O'Connor (2-28)

The 1999 All-Ireland Intermediate Hurling Championship was the 16th staging of the All-Ireland Intermediate Hurling Championship since its establishment by the Gaelic Athletic Association in 1961. The championship began on 30 May 1999 and ended on 25 September 1999.

Limerick entered the championship as the defending champions, however, they were beaten by Waterford in the Munster first round.

The All-Ireland final was played on 25 September 1999 at St. Brendan's Park in Birr, between Galway and Kilkenny, in what was their first ever meeting in the final. Galway won the match by 3-13 to 2-10 to claim their first ever championship title.

Kilkenny's Ollie O'Connor was the championship's top scorer with 2-28.

== Results ==
=== Leinster Intermediate Hurling Championship ===
==== Leinster quarter-finals ====
12 June 1999 Quarter-final	Offaly	0-14 - 2-14	Kilkenny	St. Brendan's Park
	C Gath 0-5, M Rigney 0-2, D Pilkington 0-2, O O'Neill 0-2, D Regan 0-1, T Spain 0-1, S Tooher 0-1.		S Morrissey 1-2, O O'Connor 0-5, R Shortall 1-1, J Bolger 0-2, P Farrell 0-2, B O'Keeffe 0-2.

==== Leinster semi-finals ====
3 July 1999 Semi-final	Laois	1-15 - 0-10	Wexford	O'Moore Park
	N Delaney 0-7, J Phelan 1-2, A Coffey 0-2, J Fitzpatrick 0-2, T Kenna 0-1, B Lowry 0-1.		S Byrne 0-4, J Kenny 0-2, D O'Reilly 0-1, S Ryan 0-1, J Berry 0-1, ED Cullen 0-1.

3 July 1999 Semi-final	Kilkenny	1-16 - 1-06	Dublin	Nowlan Park
	O O'Connor 1-6, B O'Keeffe 0-3, D Maher 0-1, B Phelan 0-1, J Carey 0-1, J Bolger 0-1, A Prendergast 0-1, S Morrissey 0-1, A Cleere 0-1.		D Daly 1-0, C Ring 0-3, G Ennis 0-1, N Fleming 0-1, J Small 0-1.	Referee: J Sheridan (Kildare)

==== Leinster final ====
17 July 1999 Final	Laois	0-09 - 2-15	Kilkenny	O'Moore Park
	N Delaney 0-6, E Meagher 0-1, J Phelan 0-1, J Fitzpatrick 0-1.		O O'Connor 1-6, A Prendergast 1-2, R Shortall 0-3, P Farrell 0-2, J Carey 0-1, B O'Keeffe 0-1.

=== Munster Intermediate Hurling Championship ===
==== Munster first round ====
30 May 1999 First round	Waterford	0-11 - 1-07	Limerick	Páirc Uí Chaoimh
	B Hannon 0-5, P Prendergast 0-3, B Henley 0-2, S Prendergast 0-1.		K Casey 1-1, P Heffernan 0-3, B Ryan 0-1, B Tobin 0-1, C Fanning 0-1.	Referee: G Harrington (Cork)

==== Munster semi-finals ====
6 June 1999 Semi-final	Tipperary	3-24 - 0-07	Clare	Páirc Uí Chaoimh
	S O'Meara 0-9, P Bourke 2-2, R Killeen 1-2, D Corcoran 0-3, S Maher 0-2, M Spillane 0-2, D Browne 0-2, J McGrath 0-1, K Nealon 0-1.		M Daffy 0-4, D Conway 0-1, S Barry 0-1, P Barry 0-1.	Referee: J Kelly (Waterford)

13 June 1999 Semi-final	Cork	1-15 - 0-16	Waterford	Semple Stadium
	B Coleman 1-2, G Cummins 0-5, J O'Driscoll 0-3, A Walsh 0-1, R Dwane 0-1, J O'Dwyer 0-1, D Moher 0-1, R Sheehan 0-1.		B Hannon 0-5, S Prendergast 0-3, P Prendergast 0-3, B Henley 0-2, D Casey 0-1, C Fanning 0-1, A Fitzgerald 0-1.	Referee: TJ Corby (Tipperary)

==== Munster final ====
21 July 1999 Final	Cork	2-09 - 1-07	Tipperary	Páirc Mac Gearailt
	G Cummins 1-2, J O'Driscoll 1-2, T O'Mahony 0-1, J O'Dwyer 0-1, D Barrett 0-1, K Long 0-1, J O'Callaghan 0-1.		R Killeen 1-0, D Browne 0-3, S O'Meara 0-3, M Spillane 0-1.	Referee: S McMahon (Clare)

=== All-Ireland Intermediate Hurling Championship ===
==== All-Ireland semi-finals ====
28 August 1999 Semi-final	Roscommon	1-05 - 1-18	Galway	Páirc Chiaráin
	B Boyle 0-4, R Mulry 1-0, C Kelly 0-1.		M Connolly 0-8, F Healy 1-4, N Larkin 0-1, J Donnelly 0-1, L Hogan 0-1, P Diviney 0-1, D Joyce 0-1, D Donoghue 0-1.	Referee: T McIntyre (Antrim)

4 September 1999 Semi-final	Kilkenny	4-11 - 2-14	Cork	Fraher Field
	A Prendergast 2-1, O O'Connor 0-6, J Bolger 1-1, J Carey 1-0, P Farrell 0-2, B O'Keeffe 0-1.		G Cummins 1-7, J O'Callaghan 0-4, T O'Mahony 1-0, J O'Driscoll 0-1, R Dwane 0-1, B Coleman 0-1.	Referee: M Wadding (Waterford)

==== All-Ireland final ====
25 September 1999 Final	Galway	3-13 - 2-10	Kilkenny	St. Brendan's Park
	M Connolly 1-4, G Glynn 1-2, J Donnelly 1-0, D Donoghue 0-3, D Joyce 0-2, L Hogan 0-1, F Healy 0-1.		A Prendergast 2-0, O O'Connor 0-5, P Farrell 0-3, J Carey 0-1, B O'Keeffe 0-1.

== Championship statistics ==
=== Top scorers ===
Top scorers overall

Rank	Player	County	Tally	Total	Matches	Average
1	Ollie O'Connor	Kilkenny	2-28	34	5	6.80
2	Ger Cummins	Cork	2-14	20	3	6.66
3	Anthony Prendergast	Kilkenny	5-04	19	5	3.80
4	Michael Connolly	Galway	1-12	15	2	7.50
5	Noel Delaney	Laois	0-13	13	2	6.50

Top scorers in a single game

Rank	Player	Club	Tally	Total	Opposition
1	Ger Cummins	Cork	1-07	10	Kilkenny
2	Ollie O'Connor	Kilkenny	1-06	9	Dublin
2	Ollie O'Connor	Kilkenny	1-06	9	Laois
2	Seán O'Meara	Tipperary	0-09	9	Clare
5	Pádraig Bourke	Tipperary	2-02	8	Clare
5	Michael Connolly	Galway	0-08	8	Roscommon
7	Anthony Prendergast	Kilkenny	2-01	7	Cork
7	Michael Connolly	Galway	1-04	7	Kilkenny
7	Fergal Healy	Galway	1-04	7	Roscommon
7	Noel Delaney	Laois	0-07	7	Wexford
