= Ollie O'Connor (Kilkenny hurler) =

Irish hurler

Personal information
- Native name: Oilibhéar Ó Conchúir (Irish)
- Born: 1975 (age 50–51) Freshford, County Kilkenny, Ireland
- Occupation: Quality controller
- Height: 5 ft 10 in (178 cm)

Sport
- Sport: Hurling
- Position: Full-forward
Club
- Years: Club
- St. Lachtain's
Club titles
- Kilkenny titles: 0
Inter-county*
| Years | County | Apps (scores) |
| 1998 | Kilkenny | 0 (0-00) |
Inter-county titles
- Leinster titles: 0
- All-Irelands: 0
- NHL: 0
- All Stars: 0
- *Inter County team apps and scores correct as of 23:11, 10 April 2022.

Oliver O'Connor (born 1975) is an Irish former hurler who played for Kilkenny IHC club St. Lachtain's and at inter-county level with the Kilkenny senior hurling team. He usually lined out in the full-forward line.

== Career ==
O'Connor played hurling as a schoolboy with St. Kieran's College. He won the Dr. Croke Cup with the college in 1993, the same year he won a Kilkenny Junior Hurling Championship title with the St. Lachtain's club. He was also part of the St. Lachtain's team that won the All-Ireland Club Championship title in 2010. O'Connor first appeared on the inter-county scene as top scorer on the Kilkenny minor hurling team that beat Galway in the 1993 All-Ireland minor final. His three years in the under-21 grade yielded an All-Ireland U20HC title in 1994. At adult level O'Connor won an All-Ireland JHC title in 1995 before spending a number of unsuccessful seasons with the Kilkenny senior hurling team. He ended his inter-county career with the Kilkenny intermediate hurling team.

== Career statistics ==
| Team | Year | National League | | | Leinster | | All-Ireland | | Total | |
| Team | Year | Division | Apps | Score | Apps | Score | Apps | Score | Apps | Score |
|---|---|---|---|---|---|---|---|---|---|---|
| Kilkenny | 1998 | Division 1A | 1 | 1-04 | — | | — | | 1 | 1-04 |
| Career total | | | 1 | 1-04 | — | | — | | 1 | 1-04 |

== Honours ==
St. Kieran's College

- All-Ireland Colleges Senior Hurling Championship: 1993
- Leinster Colleges Senior Hurling Championship: 1993

St. Lachtain's

- All-Ireland Intermediate Club Hurling Championship: 2010
- Leinster Intermediate Club Hurling Championship: 2009
- Kilkenny Intermediate Hurling Championship: 2009
- Kilkenny Junior Hurling Championship: 1993

Kilkenny

- Leinster Intermediate Hurling Championship: 1997, 1999
- All-Ireland Junior Hurling Championship: 1995
- Leinster Junior Hurling Championship: 1994, 1995
- All-Ireland Under-21 Hurling Championship: 1994
- Leinster Under-21 Hurling Championship: 1994, 1995
- All-Ireland Minor Hurling Championship: 1993
- Leinster Minor Hurling Championship: 1993
