= 1984 Kilkenny Intermediate Hurling Championship =

- Champions: St Lachtain's (1st title); S. Connery (captain)
- Runners-up: Graignamanagh; P. Prendergast (captain)

The 1984 Kilkenny Intermediate Hurling Championship was the 20th staging of the Kilkenny Intermediate Hurling Championship since its establishment by the Kilkenny County Board in 1929.

The final was played on 4 November 1984 at Nowlan Park in Kilkenny, between St Lachtain's and Graignamanagh, in what was their first ever meeting in the final. St Lachtain's won the match by 2–14 to 1–05 to claim their first ever championship title.

== Results ==
=== Final ===
4 November 1984 Final	St Lachtain's	2-14 - 1-05	Graignamanagh	Nowlan Park
	P Phelan 1-2, B Waldron 0-5, S Connery 1-0, M Morrissey 0-2, T Beckett 0-2, M Kennedy 0-2, E Maher 0-1.		P Nolan 1-0, T Dowling 0-2, J Whelan 0-2, M Morrissey 0-1.
