= Shane Moloney =

Galway hurler

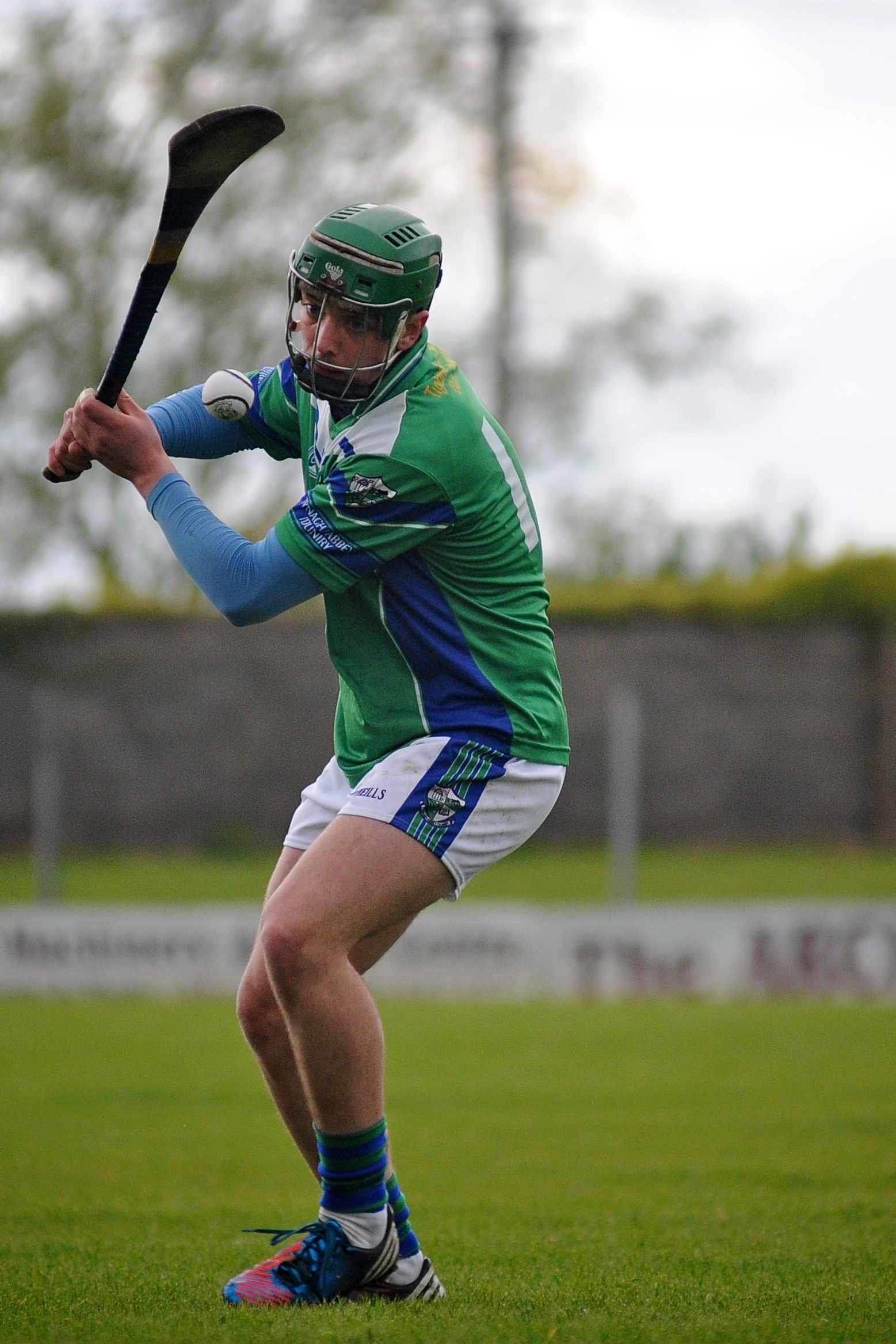
- Shane Moloney in 2014

Personal information
- Native name: Shane Ó Maoldomhnaigh (Irish)
- Born: 4 March 1993 (age 33) Galway, Ireland
- Occupation: Student
- Height: 1.81 m (5 ft 11 in)

Sport
- Sport: Hurling
- Position: Left corner forward
Club
- Years: Club
- 2010–: Tynagh-Abbey/Duniry
Inter-county*
Years	County	Apps (scores)
2015–	Galway	7 (0–3)
Inter-county titles
- Leinster titles: 1
- All-Irelands: 1
- NHL: 1
- All Stars: 13
- *Inter County team apps and scores correct as of 7 September 2015.

Shane Moloney (born 4 March 1993) is an Irish hurler who plays at senior level as a corner-forward for the Galway county team, and also plays with his club Tynagh-Abbey/Duniry.

Moloney captained Galway as they won the All-Ireland title in 2011 where he scored 1–9 in the final against Dublin. On 16 August 2015, he came on as a substitute with five minutes remaining in Galway's All-Ireland Senior Hurling Semi-final against Tipperary. With the game into the last of the three minutes of stoppage time, Moloney scored the winning point to put Galway into the final.

On 3 September 2017, Moloney came on as a substitute for Galway in the second half as they won their first All-Ireland Senior Hurling Championship in 29 years against Waterford.

== Honours ==
Galway

- All-Ireland Senior Hurling Championship (1): 2017
- National Hurling League Division 1 (1): 2017
- Leinster Senior Hurling Championship (1): 2017

Sporting positions
Preceded by Daithí Burke	Galway minor hurling team captain 2011	Succeeded by Paul Killeen
Achievements
Preceded by Cillian Buckley	All-Ireland MHC winning captain 2011	Succeeded by Bill Maher
