= Eoin Guinan =

Irish hurler

Personal information
- Native name: Eoin Ó Coinneáin (Irish)
- Nickname: Geezo
- Born: 4 February 1986 (age 40) Freshford, County Kilkenny, Ireland
- Occupation: Bricklayer
- Height: 5 ft 10 in (178 cm)

Sport
- Sport: Hurling
- Position: Left corner-forward
Clubs
- Years: Club
- St Lachtain's; Sarsfields
Club titles
- Kilkenny titles: 0
Inter-county*
Years	County	Apps (scores)
2009-2011	Kilkenny	0 (0-00)
Inter-county titles
- Leinster titles: 1
- All-Irelands: 0
- NHL: 0
- All Stars: 0
- *Inter County team apps and scores correct as of 20:34, 27 July 2021.

Eoin Guinan (born 4 February 1986) is an Irish hurler who plays for Western Australian club Sarsfields. He began his career with St. Lachtain's and is a former member of the Kilkenny senior hurling team.

== Career ==
Born in Freshford, County Kilkenny, Guinan first came to prominence with the St Lachtain's club that won championship titles in various grades of Gaelic football. He later captained the St Lachtain's intermediate hurling team to the 2010 All-Ireland Club Championship title. Guinan first appeared on the inter-county scene as a member of the Kilkenny minor team that won the All-Ireland Championship title in 2003. He later won consecutive Leinster Under-21 Championship titles with the under-21 team. Guinan was drafted onto the Kilkenny senior hurling team for the 2009 Walsh Cup and was a member of the extended panel for much of the following three seasons.

== Career statistics ==
Team	Year	National League			Leinster		All-Ireland		Total	
Team	Year	Division	Apps	Score	Apps	Score	Apps	Score	Apps	Score
Kilkenny	2010	Division 1	2	0-05	0	0-00	0	0-00	2	0-05
Kilkenny	2011	Division 1	2	0-00	0	0-00	0	0-00	2	0-00
Career total			4	0-05	0	0-00	0	0-00	4	0-05

== Honours ==
St Lachtain's

- All-Ireland Intermediate Club Hurling Championship: 2010
- Leinster Intermediate Club Hurling Championship: 2009
- Kilkenny Intermediate Hurling Championship: 2009

Kilkenny

- Leinster Senior Hurling Championship: 2010
- Walsh Cup: 2009
- Leinster Under-21 Hurling Championship: 2005, 2006
- All-Ireland Minor Hurling Championship: 2003
- Leinster Minor Hurling Championship: 2003, 2004
