= 2011 All-Ireland Minor Hurling Championship =

All-Ireland Minor Hurling Championship 2011
Championship Details
- Dates: 9 April 2011– 4 September 2011
- Teams: 26

All Ireland Champions
- Winners: Galway (9th win)
- Captain: Shane Maloney
- Manager: Mattie Murphy

All Ireland Runners-up
- Runners-up: Dublin
- Captain: Chris Crummey
- Manager: Shay Boland

Provincial Champions
- Munster: Clare
- Leinster: Dublin
- Ulster: Antrim
- Connacht: Not Played

Championship Statistics
- Matches Played: 35
- Top Scorer: Mattie Lennon (4-25)

The 2011 All-Ireland Minor Hurling Championship was the 81st staging of the All-Ireland Minor Hurling Championship since its establishment by the Gaelic Athletic Association in 1928. The championship began on 9 April 2011 and ended on 4 September 2011.

Kilkenny entered the championship as the defending champions, however, they were beaten by Waterford in the All-Ireland quarter-final.

On 4 September 2011, Galway won the championship after a 1-21 to 1-12 defeat of Dublin in the All-Ireland final at Croke Park. This was their 9th championship title overall and their first title since 2009.

Armagh's Mattie Lennon was the championship's top scorer with 4-25.

== Results ==
=== Leinster Minor Hurling Championship ===
Preliminary round

9 April 2011 Preliminary round	Carlow	1-09 - 2-24	Westmeath	Dr. Cullen Park, Carlow
	R Smithers 1-1, A Beaton 0-4, M Kavanagh 0-2, B Nolan 0-1, D Dalton 0-1.		A Clarke 1-7, N Kirby 0-5, D Higgins 1-1, C Scally 0-2, D Lynch 0-2, D McCormack 0-2, R Greville 0-2, P Fennell 0-1, J Boyle 0-1, M Murray 0-1.	Referee: G Quilty (Kilkenny)

First round

23 April 2011 First round	Carlow	3-22 - 0-05	Wicklow	Dr. Cullen Park, Carlow
	M Kavanagh (1-8, 5f); J Murphy (1-3), R Smithers (1-1), P Shaw (0-3), D Dalton (0-2), P Fortune (0-2); S Murphy (0-1); C Fenlon (0-1), A Beaton (0-1).		D Masterson (0-1, '65'), R Brandon (0-1), A Byrne (0-1), M Lee (0-1), M Murphy (0-1).	Referee: M Flynn (Kilkenny)

23 April 2011 First round	Kildare	1-14 - 1-16	Meath	St. Conleth's Park, Newbridge
	G Keegan (0-7, 4f), C Forde (1-0), R Casey (0-2), G Savage (0-1); D Flaherty (0-1, 1f), N Donnelly (0-1); K Byrne (0-1), R Bergin (0-1).		C Fitzsimons (0-10, 8f), J Regan (1-2), J Toher (0-2, 1f), A Ennis (0-1), D Keenan (0-1).	Referee: J Lalor (Laois)

23 April 2011 First round	Laois	0-16 - 1-19	Westmeath	O'Moore Park, Portlaoise
	S Maher (0-9, 4f), J Campion (0-2), C Dwyer (0-2), R Peacock (0-1); T Dowling (0-1), P Whelan (0-1).		A Clarke (0-4, 3f), N Kirby (1-0), D Higgins (0-3), P Fennell (0-2); N O'Brien (0-2), R Greville (0-2), C Scally (0-2, 2f), K Glennon (0-2), D Lynch (0-1), D McCormack (0-1);

23 April 2011 First round	Wexford	3-13 - 3-10	Offaly	Wexford Park, Wexford
	J Guiney (2-7, 2-3f, 0-2 '65s'), C McDonald (1-1), C Hughes (0-2), R Clarke (0-2, 2f), D Dunne (0-1).		P Geraghty (1-4, 1-2f, 2 '65s'); T Geraghty (0-4, 4f), J Sampson (1-0), J O'Connor (1-0), N Wynne (0-1), D Cleary (0-1).	Referee: G McGrath (Dublin)

Second round

7 May 2011 Second round	Carlow	1-10 - 3-15	Offaly	Dr. Cullen Park, Carlow
	J Murphy (1-2), M Kavanagh (0-5, all frees); P Fortune (0-1), D Dalton (0-1), P Shaw (0-1, free).		C Kiely (0-8, seven frees, one 65), T Geraghty (2-1); J Sampson (1-1), A Kelly (0-2), P Geraghty (0-1, free), D Kelleher (0-1), J O'Connor (0-1).	Referee: A Mac Suibhne (Dublin)

7 May 2011 Second round	Meath	4-08 - 2-21	Laois	Páirc Tailteann, Navan
	C Fitzsimons (1-7, 6f), J Regan (1-1), C Murray (1-0), J Toher (1-0, free).		S Maher (1-10, 7f); C Dwyer (1-6, 1f), R Peacock (0-4), C Hyland (0-1).	Referee: B Brady (Louth)

7 May 2011 Second round	Westmeath	1-11 - 2-10	Kilkenny	Cusack Park, Mullingar
	N O'Brien (1-4, 3f), C Scally (0-3, three frees), R Greville (0-2), A Clarke (0-2).		K Kelly (1-6, 4f), J Hayes (1-1), D Kearns (0-1), R Reid (0-1), R Moran (0-1).	Referee: J Heffernan (Wexford)

7 May 2011 Second round	Wexford	3-10 - 1-18	Dublin	Wexford Park, Wexford
	R Clarke (2-1), J Guiney (0-4, 3f), A Nolan (1-0), G Moore (0-3, 2f), C Hughes (0-1), C McDonald (0-1).		P Winters (0-6, 4f), C Kilkenny (1-1, 1 pen, 1f), J Desmond (0-3, three frees), C Cronin (0-2); A Clabby (0-2), C McHugh (0-1), C Costello (0-1), B McCarthy (0-1), O O'Rorke (0-1).	Referee: S Cleere (Wexford)

Third round

21 May 2011 Third round	Laois	1-07 - 2-12	Wexford	O'Moore Park, Portlaoise
	S Maher (0-4, 2f), C Dwyer (1-0), R Peacock (0-1); PJ Scully (0-1), J Campion (0-1).		R Clarke (0-8, 8f), C McDonald (2-1), A Nolan (0-2), J Guiney (0-1).	Referee: J Keenan (Wicklow)

21 May 2011 Third round	Offaly	0-09 - 1-14	Westmeath	O'Connor Park, Tullamore
	P Geraghty (0-6, 6f), C Kiely (0-1, 1f), S Gardiner (0-1, 1 '65'), A Kelly (0-1).		A Clarke (0-6, 4f), C Scally (0-4, 3f, 1 '65'), P Fennell (1-0), N O'Brien (0-3), D Lynch (0-1).	Referee: G McGrath (Dublin)

Semi-finals

25 June 2011 Semi-final	Dublin	1-16 - 2-07	Westmeath	Parnell Park, Dublin
	P Winters (0-3, 0-1 free), O O'Rorke (1-0), E Ó Conghaile (0-3), C Kilkenny (0-2); C Costello (0-2), A Clabby (0-2, 0-1 free), C McHugh (0-2), G Whelan (0-1), B McCarthy (0-1).		N O'Brien (1-2, 0-1 free), D Higgins (1-0), A Clarke (0-4, 0-2 frees), D McCormack (0-1).	Referee: P O'Dwyer (Carlow)

25 June 2011 Semi-final	Wexford	2-13 - 2-19	Kilkenny	Wexford Park, Wexford
	C Devitt; A Nolan (1-3), R Clarke (0-6, 0-5 frees), G Moore (0-4, 0-1 free, 0-1 sideline), J Guiney (1-0, free).		K Kelly (1-10, 0-9 frees, 0-1 65); C Martin (1-1), C Bolger (0-2); K Walsh (0-2), R Reid (0-2), R Moran (0-1), P Vickery (0-1).	Referee: J Keenan (Wicklow)

Final

3 July 2011 Final	Dublin	1-14 - 1-11	Kilkenny	Croke Park, Dublin
	C Costello (1-2), E Ó Conghaile (0-3); O O'Rorke (0-2, 0-1 free), C Kilkenny (0-2, 0-1 free), P Winters (0-2, 0-1 free), C Crummy (0-1), J Desmond (0-1, free), G Whelan (0-1).		J Maher (1-1), K Kelly (0-3, 0-2 frees), P Vickery (0-2), R Reid (0-2), T O'Hanrahan (0-1), C O'Shea (0-1), D Kearns (0-1).	Referee: J Heffernan (Wexford)

=== Munster Minor Hurling Championship ===
Quarter-finals

27 April 2011 Quarter-final	Kerry	1-08 - 6-24	Clare	Austin Stack Park, Tralee
	P Boyle 1-1, PJ Connolly 0-3, M Delaney 0-2 (0-1f), S Dunne 0-2 (0-1f)	(Report)	O Hickey 3-1, A Mulready 2-2, A Cunningham 0-6, C O’Connor 0-6 ( 0-4f), S O’Donnell 1-1, C Galvin 0-3, T Kelly 0-3, G O’Connell 0-1, J Colleran 0-1	Referee: J O’Brien (Tipperary)

27 April 2011 Quarter-final	Limerick	2-14 - 0-12	Cork	Gaelic Grounds, Limerick
	S Dowling 0-7 (0-4f), J Aherne 1-2, D Reidy 0-4 (0-2f), B O’Connor 1-0, M Fitzgerald 0-1	(Report)	R O’Shea 0-7 (0-7f), A Cadogan 0-1, C Murphy 0-1, C Walsh 0-1, K O’Keeffe 0-1 (0-1f), P O’Callaghan 0-1 (0-1f)	Referee: D Fox (Clare)

27 April 2011 Quarter-final	Waterford	2-16 - 1-13	Tipperary	Walsh Park, Waterford
	J Dillon 0-10 (0-8f, 0-1 ‘65), C Chester 1-2, M Harney 1-0, A O’Sullivan 0-3, S Roche 0-1	(Report)	L McGrath 0-8 (0-7f), J Forde 1-1 (1-0f), D McCormack 0-2, C Horan 0-1, S Maher 0-1	Referee: D Mackessy (Limerick)

Playoffs

30 April 2011 Round 1	Cork	0-25 - 2-06	Kerry	Páirc Uí Chaoimh, Cork
	R O’Shea 0-13 (0-11f), A Cadogan 0-4, K McIntyre 0-2, C Murphy 0-2, P O’Callaghan 0-2, D Sweetnam 0-2	(Report)	P Boyle 1-3, S Dunne 1-0, R Heffernan 0-1, PJ Connolly 0-1, L Fitzell 0-1	Referee: S Hourigan (Limerick)

8 May 2011 Round 2	Tipperary	2-16 - 1-09	Cork	Semple Stadium, Thurles
	L McGrath 0-9 (7f, 2 65s), C Horan 2-2, J McGrath 0-2, C Hammersley 0-2, D McCormack 0-1	(Report)	R O’Shea 0-5 (4f), P O’Callaghan 1-0, K McIntyre 0-2, D Cahill 0-1, D Sweetman 0-1	Referee: P Casey (Waterford)

Semi-finals

24 June 2011 Semi-final	Tipperary	1-13 - 3-13	Clare	Semple Stadium, Thurles
	L McGrath 0-9 (7f), J Forde 1-0, P Ralph 0-2, D McCormack 0-1, S Cahill 0-1	(Report)	C O’Connell 0-4 (2f, 1 65), T Kelly 0-4 (2f), C Galvin 1-1, A Mulready 1-0, P Duggan 0-3 (1sl), E Enright 1-0, A Cunningham 0-1	Referee: J O’Connell (Cork)

25 June 2011 Semi-final	Waterford	4-17 - 3-15 (aet)	Limerick	Walsh Park, Waterford
	S Bennett (3-2), J Dillon 0-8 (0-6f, 0-1 65), G O’Brien 0-3 (0-1f), R Barry 0-1, D Breathnach 0-1, D Flynn 1-0, C Heffernan 0-1, S McNulty 0-1	(Report)	K O’Brien 2-2, S Dowling 0-7 (0-7f), M Carmody 1-3 (0-1f), J Aherne 0-2, D Morrissey 0-1	Referee: F Horgan (Tipperary)

Final

10 July 2011 Final	Clare	1-20 - 3-09	Waterford	Páirc Uí Chaoimh, Cork
	C O’Connell 0-10 (0-10f), T Kelly 0-3 (0-1 65), O Hickey 1-0, A Cunningham, C Galvin 0-2 each, J Colleran, J Shanahan, P Duggan 0-1 each.	(Report)	A O’Sullivan 2-1, J Dillon 0-5 (4fs, 1 65), G O’Brien 1-1, D Breathnach 0-2.	Referee: J O’Connell (Cork)

=== Ulster Minor Hurling Championship ===
First round

14 May 2011 First round	Tyrone	0-01 - 5-16	Derry	Healy Park, Omagh
	T McGurk 0-1.		S Farren 1-9, B Rodgers 1-1, O McFlynn 1-1, G Bradley 1-0, D Mullan 1-0, C O'Doherty 0-3, B Óg McGilligan 0-1, N Farren 0-1.	Referee: L McAuley (Antrim)

14 May 2011 First round	Cavan	3-06 - 1-07	Monaghan	Kingspan Breffni Park, Cavan
	J Galligan 2-0, C Crowe 1-0, A Mulcahy 0-3, N Neary 0-2, J Kelly 0-1.		N Garland 1-2, F Rafter 0-2, N Butler 0-1, D Moorehead 0-1, C McNally 0-1.	Referee: J Devlin (Tyrone)

14 May 2011 First round	Donegal	1-03 - 3-13	Down	O'Donnell Park, Letterkenny
	C Harkin 1-1, R McDermott 0-1, H O'Donnell 0-1.		L McMullan 0-6, M Conway 1-2, S Mageean 1-0, M Nicholson 1-0, E Conway 0-2, M Conlan 0-2, P Macken 0-1.	Referee: C Gunning (Antrim)

14 May 2011 First round	Fermanagh	1-08 - 11-24	Armagh	Brewster Park, Enniskillen
	C Corrigan 0-8, B McDermott 1-0.		M Lennon 2-10, D McCreesh 2-4, E Robb 2-2, S Reneghan 1-4, S Colton 1-2, D Magee 1-0, F Burns 1-0, R Gribbin 1-0, R Fullerton 0-1, R Connolly 0-1.

Quarter-finals

29 May 2011 Quarter-final	Derry	2-19 - 3-09	Down	Casement Park, Belfast
	S Farren 1-11, C O'Doherty 1-2, L Murphy 0-2, M Óg McGilligan 0-1, G Bradley 0-1, B Rodgers 0-1, D Mullan 0-1.		C Bailie 1-5, M Conlon 1-1, M Nicholson 1-0, F McMullan 0-2, M Conway 0-1.

29 May 2011 Quarter-final	Armagh	4-20 - 1-04	Cavan	Athletic Grounds, Armagh
	M Lennon 1-9, D McCreesh 2-0, M Toal 1-3, R Fullerton 0-4, E Carville 0-3, T Donnelly 0-1.		J Galligan 1-0, N Neary 0-3, G McGovern 0-1.

Semi-final

12 June 2011 Semi-final	Derry	1-14 - 1-08	Armagh	Casement Park, Belfast
	C O'Doherty 1-5, T McCloskey 0-5, L Murphy 0-1, G Bradley 0-1, S Farren 0-1, B Rodgers 0-1.		M Lennon 1-6, D McCreesh 0-1.	Referee: J Clarke (Cavan)

Final

3 July 2011 Final	Antrim	4-17 - 1-08	Derry	Casement Park, Belfast
	Conor Johnston (1-5), D McCloskey (1-5); Sean McAfee (1-1), D McKernan (1-1), Stephen McAfee (0-3); J McGreevy (0-1), C Jennings (0-1).		G Bradley (1-2), C Doherty (1-1), S Farren (0-3, 2f), T McCloskey (0-2, 1f, 1 '65'), M Warnock (0-1).	Referee: J Devlin (Tyrone)

=== All-Ireland Minor Hurling Championship ===
Quarter-finals

23 July 2011 Quarter-final	Antrim	0-12 - 8-26	Galway	Parnell Park, Dublin
	D McCloskey 0-6 (5f), C Johnson 0-3, J McCreevey, M Bradley, N McKenna all 0-1 each.	Report	J Carr 3-2, S Maloney 1-4 (0-1f, 0-1 '65), K Cullinane 0-6, B Lane, J Flynn 1-2 each, A Tuohy 0-5, J Glynn 1-1, S Caulfield 1-0, D Higgins, P Flaherty, M Mullins, B Keane 0-1 each	Referee: S Whelan (Wexford)

23 July 2011 Quarter-final	Waterford	0-15 - 0-09	Kilkenny	Walsh Park, Waterford
	J Dillon 0-5 (5f), P O'Keeffe, D Breathnach 0-4, G O'Brien 0-3, R Barry 0-2, C Curran 0-1.	Report	K Kelly 0-4 (4f), P Vickery 0-2, P Kenneally 0-1, E McGrath 0-1, C Bolger 0-1.

Semi-finals

14 August 2011 Semi-final	Dublin	6-19 - 5-13	Waterford	Croke Park, Dublin
	C Costello 4-2, C Kilkenny 1-6 (0-1f), P Winters 1-3 (0-2f), A Clabby 0-3, E Ó Conghaile 0-1, C Cronin 0-1, G Whelan 0-1, J Desmond 0-1, M McCaffrey 0-1, B McCarthy 0-1.	Report	G O’Brien 1-3, S Bennett 1-1, P O’Keeffe 1-1, C Heffernan 1-0, A O’Sullivan 1-0, D Breathnach 0-3, J Dillion 0-2 (0-1f), C Curran 0-1, J Barron 0-1, C Chester 0-1.	Referee: G Duffy

7 August 2011 Semi-final	Clare	1-18 - 1-23	Galway	Croke Park, Dublin
	C O’Connell 0-6 (0-2f) A Cunningham 0-4, O Hickey 1-0, T Kelly 0-3 (0-1f), C Galvin 0-3, S O’Donnell 0-2, M Moroney 0-1.	Report	S Maloney 0-10 (0-7f), G O’Donoghue 1-2, J Carr 0-3, P Brehony 0-2, D Higgins 0-2, J Hanbary 0-1, B Lane 0-1, M Mullins 0-1, B Molloy 0-1.

Final

4 September 2011 Final	Galway	1-21 - 1-12	Dublin	Croke Park, Dublin
	S Maloney 1-9 (0-6f), P Brehony 0-4, J Flynn 0-3, A Tuohy, D Higgins, G O’Donoghue, J Carr, D Dolan 0-1 each.	Report	C Kilkenny 1-3 (1-1f), P Winters 0-3 (0-2f, 0-1 ‘65), A Clabby (0-1f), C Cronin 0-2 each, M McCaffrey, C Costello 0-1 each.	Referee: J Ryan (Tipperary)

== Championship statistics ==
=== Top scorers ===
Top scorers overall

Rank	Player	Club	Tally	Total	Matches	Average
1	Mattie Lennon	Armagh	4-25	37	3	12.33
2	Shane Farren	Derry	2-24	30	4	7.50
3	Shane Moloney	Galway	2-23	29	3	9.66
3	Kevin Kelly	Kilkenny	2-23	29	4	7.25
5	Jake Dillon	Wexford	0-28	28	4	7.00
6	Stephen Maher	Laois	1-23	26	3	8.66
6	Aonghus Clarke	Westmeath	1-23	26	5	5.20
6	Cathal O'Connell	Clare	0-26	26	4	6.50
6	Liam McGrath	Tipperary	0-26	26	3	8.66
10	Rob O'Shea	Cork	0-25	25	3	8.33

Top scorers in a single game

Rank	Player	Club	Tally	Total	Opposition
1	Mattie Lennon	Armagh	2-10	16	Fermanagh
2	Cormac Costello	Dublin	4-02	14	Waterford
2	Shane Farren	Derry	1-11	14	Down
4	Jack Guiney	Wexford	2-07	13	Offaly
4	Kevin Kelly	Kilkenny	1-10	13	Wexford
4	Stephen Maher	Laois	1-10	13	Meath
4	Rob O'Shea	Cork	0-13	13	Kerry
8	Shane Farren	Derry	1-09	12	Tyrone
8	Mattie Lennon	Armagh	1-09	12	Cavan
8	Shane Moloney	Galway	1-09	12	Dublin
