= 2009–10 All-Ireland Intermediate Club Hurling Championship =

Championship Details
- Dates: 4 October 2009 – 13 February 2010
- Teams: 22

All Ireland Champions
- Winners: St. Lachtain's (1st win)
- Captain: Eoin Guinan
- Manager: Mick McCarthy

All Ireland Runners-up
- Runners-up: St. Gall's
- Captain: Johnny Flynn
- Manager: Darren McKeown

Provincial Champions
- Munster: South Liberties
- Leinster: St. Lachtain's
- Ulster: St. Gall's
- Connacht: Tynagh-Abbey/Duniry

Championship Statistics
- Matches Played: 21
- Total Goals: 61 (2.90 per game)
- Total Points: 515 (24.52 per game)

The 2009–10 All-Ireland Intermediate Club Hurling Championship was the sixth staging of the All-Ireland Intermediate Club Hurling Championship since its establishment by the Gaelic Athletic Association in 2004. The championship ran from 4 October 2009 to 13 February 2010.

The All-Ireland final was played on 13 February 2010 at Croke Park in Dublin, between St. Lachtain's from Kilkenny and St. Gall's from Antrim. St. Lachtain's won the match by 3-17 to 0-10 to claim their first ever All-Ireland title.

== Connacht Intermediate Club Hurling Championship ==
=== Connacht semi-final ===
25 October 2009 Semi-final	Four Roads	2-16 - 3-18 (aet)	Ballyhaunis	Athleague Grounds
	D Dolan 0-7, S Curley 1-2, J Coyne 1-0, J Moran 0-2, R Mulry 0-2, M Kelly 0-1, B Mannion 0-1, E Mulry 0-1.		K Higgins 0-11, N Murphy 1-2, F Walsh 1-0, L Lyons 1-0, S Hoban 0-2, C McCrudden 0-2, D McConn 0-1, P Higgins 0-1.

=== Connacht final ===
15 November 2009 Final	Tynagh-Abbey/Duniry	1-19 - 0-12	Ballyhaunis	Athleague Grounds
	B Cunningham 0-7, M Dervan 1-2, A Burke 0-5, C Larkin 0-3, R Madden 0-1, D Donnelly 0-1.	Report	K Higgins 0-4, S Hoban 0-3, N Murphy 0-2, D McConn 0-2, T Buckley 0-1, B Hunt 0-1.

== Leinster Intermediate Club Hurling Championship ==
=== Leinster quarter-finals ===
25 October 2009 Quarter-final	Celbridge	1-11 - 1-10	Kildakey	Celbridge Grounds
	M Moloney (1-0); P Moloney (0-3, fs), T Murphy (0-3), J Houlihan (0-2, 1 s'line); C Kenny (0-2), S O'Carroll (0-1).	Report	N Kirby (0-7, 6 fs, 1 '65'), P Keogh (1-0), D Doran (0-2), S Heavey (0-1).

25 October 2009 Quarter-final	St Lachtain's	2-12 - 0-15	Askamore	Páirc Lachtain
	B Beckett 2-2, E Guinan 0-5, O O'Connor 0-1, J Fitzpatrick 0-1, P Guinan 0-1, B Kennedy 0-1, N Hickey 0-1.	Report	S Tomkins 0-8, PJ Nolan 0-3, E Sheridan 0-1, P Byrne 0-1, F Boggan 0-1, B Nolan 0-1.

=== Leinster semi-finals ===
8 November 2009 Semi-final	St Lachtain's	3-11 - 3-05	Carnew Emmets	Páirc Lachtain
	B Beckett 1-5, J Fitzpatrick 1-1, D Brennan 1-0, E Guinan 0-3, R Dowling 0-1, O O'Connor 0-1.	Report	B Osborne 2-1, T Collins 1-2, D Hyland 0-2.

8 November 2009 Semi-final	Celbridge	1-08 - 2-16	Mount Leinster Rangers	Celbridge Grounds
	M Moloney 1-1, B White 0-4, N Ó Muineacháin 0-2, T Murphy 0-1.	Report	D Murphy 1-3, W Hickey 0-4, E Byrne 1-0, J Coady 0-3, J Hickey 0-2, D Phelan 0-2, D Byrne 0-1, E Coady 0-1.

=== Leinster final ===
22 November 2008 Final	Mount Leinster Rangers	0-07 - 1-08	St. Lachtain's	Dr Cullen Park
	D Murphy 0-7.	Report	E Guinan 1-4, B Beckett 0-2, N Hickey 0-1, O O'Connor 0-1.

== Munster Intermediate Club Hurling Championship ==
=== Munster quarter-finals ===
31 October 2009 Quarter-final	Whitegate	1-13 - 0-10	Carrick Davins	Scariff Grounds
	G Waterstone 0-8, S Malone 1-0, J Minogue 0-1, T Holland 0-1, P Minogue 0-1, T Fahy 0-1, M O'Brien 0-1.		M Cronin 0-6, S Butler 0-1, J Murphy 0-1, S Cronin 0-1, L Mackey 0-1.

1 November 2009 Quarter-final	Douglas	1-23 - 1-12 (aet)	Kilmoyley	Páirc Uí Rinn
	R Murphy 0-10, M Collins 1-3, O Mulrooney 0-2, B Fitzgerald 0-2, S Moylan 0-2, M Harrington 0-2, J Moylan 0-1, R Keating 0-1.		S Brick 0-8, S Maunsell 1-2, B Brick 0-1, P O'Sullivan 0-1.	Referee: J O'Mahony (Limerick)

=== Munster semi-finals ===
8 November 2009 Semi-final	Dungarvan	1-09 - 2-22	Douglas	Fraher Field
	Cormac Curran 0-7, K Duggan 1-0, D Morrissey 0-1, J Lynch 0-1.		M Harrington 2-8, R Murphy 0-4, B Fitzgerald 0-3, M Collins 0-2, O Mulrooney 0-2, S Moylan 0-1, J Moylan 0-1, C O'Mahony 0-1.	Referee: J Ryan (Tipperary)

8 November 2009 Semi-final	Whitegate	1-09 - 1-11	South Liberties	Cusack Park
	S Malone 1-0, G Waterstone 0-2, I Fahy 0-2, J Malone 0-1, J Minogue 0-1, P Minogue 0-1, J O'Brien 0-1, A Fahey 0-1.		Mark Keane 0-4, S O'Neill 1-0, C Carbery 0-1, B Slattery 0-1, D O'Neill 0-1, Mike Keane 0-1, A Owens 0-1, M Moynihan 0-1, D Grimes 0-1.	Referee: C Lyons (Cork)

=== Munster final ===
22 November 2009 Final	Douglas	1-12 - 2-10	South Liberties	Mallow GAA Complex
	M Collins 1-1, M Harrington 0-4, R Murphy 0-4, O Mulrooney 0-1, S Moylan 0-1, J Moylan 0-1.		B Slattery 1-3, M Keane 0-4, D O'Neill 1-0, A Owens 0-2, D Grimes 0-1.	Referee: S Roche (Tipperary)

== Ulster Intermediate Club Hurling Championship ==
=== Ulster quarter-finals ===
4 October 2009 Quarter-final	Lisbellaw St Patrick's	1-06 - 6-16	St Gall's	Brewster Park
	K Kehoe 1-2, R Bogue 0-2, D McGarry 0-2.	Report	K Stewart 3-2.

5 October 2009 Quarter-final	Liatroim Fontenoys	1-16 - 1-13	Castleblayney	Páirc Esler
	P Burns 1-1, PP McCartan 0-4, L Morgan 0-3, J Brown 0-3, D Morgan 0-2, B Morgan 0-1, P McAleenan 0-1, J McCrickard 0-1.		M McHugh 1-10, J Lacey 0-1, S Lambe 0-1, G Coleman 0-1.

=== Ulster semi-finals ===
11 October 2009 Semi-final	Middletown Na Fianna	2-13 - 1-11	Liatroim Fontenoys	Casement Park

20 October 2009 Semi-final	St Gall's	5-14 - 1-06	Eoghan Ruadh	Athletic Grounds
	S McAreavey 3-1, A Gallagher 1-1, K Stewart 0-4, S O'Hara 1-0, C Gallagher 0-1.		K Morgan 1-0, D Lavery 0-2, S Donnelly 0-1, B Winters 0-1, C McErlean 0-1, G Fox 0-1.

=== Ulster final ===
25 October 2009 Final	St Gall's	5-11 - 0-12	Middletown Na Fianna	Páirc Esler
	S McAreavey 4-4, CJ McGorty 1-5, A Gallagher 0-1, K McDonald 0-1.	Report	R Gaffney 0-8, M Maguire 0-1, Donal Carville 0-1, B Mallon 0-1.

== All-Ireland Intermediate Club Hurling Championship ==
=== All-Ireland quarter-final ===
13 December 2009 Semi-final	St Gabriel's	0-06 - 3-15	South Liberties	Emerald GAA Grounds
	M O'Hara 0-2, M Finn 0-2, C Bourke 0-1, C Walsh 0-1.	Report	B Slattery 2-4, D O'Neill 0-6, D Grimes 1-0, A Owens 0-1, T Ryan 0-1, W Hickey 0-1, S Garry 0-1.

=== All-Ireland semi-finals ===
23 January 2010 Semi-final	St Gall's	0-12 - 0-10	Tynagh-Abbey/Duniry	Parnell Park
	C McGourty 0-8 (0-4f, 0-1 '65), K Stewart 0-2, K McDonald, S McAreavey 0-1 each.	Report	B Cunningham 0-7 (0-5f), R Madden 0-2 (0-1 '45'), D Donnelly 0-1.

24 January 2010 Semi-final	St Lachtain's	1-14 - 0-14	South Liberties	Seán Treacy Park
	E Guinan 1-5, R Dowling 0-4, P Guinan 0-2, N McGree, D Brennan, B Beckett 0-1 each.	Report	B Slattery 0-10, A Owens 0-2, T Ryan, R O’Neill 0-1 each.

=== All-Ireland final ===
13 February 2010 Final	St Lachtain’s	3-17 - 0-10	St Gall’s	Croke Park
	J Fitzpatrick 2-1, E Guinan 0-6, O O’Connor 1-1, R Dowling, N McGree 0-3 each, N Hickey 0-2, D Brennan 0-1.	Report	CJ McGourty 0-7, J Flynn, A Gallagher 0-1 K Stewart 0-1 each
