= 1994 All-Ireland Junior Hurling Championship =

Championship Details
- Dates: 11 May - 17 July 1994
- Teams: 12

All Ireland Champions
- Winners: Cork (11th win)
- Captain: Vincent Murray
- Manager: Ted O'Mahony

All Ireland Runners-up
- Runners-up: Kilkenny
- Captain: Declan Roche
- Manager: Noel Skehan

Provincial Champions
- Munster: Cork
- Leinster: Kilkenny
- Ulster: Fermanagh
- Connacht: Not Played

Championship Statistics
- Matches Played: 12
- Total Goals: 42 (3.50 per game)
- Total Points: 280 (23.33 per game)
- Top Scorer: Ollie O'Connor (3-22)

The 1994 All-Ireland Junior Hurling Championship was the 73rd staging of the All-Ireland Junior Championship since its establishment by the Gaelic Athletic Association in 1912. The championship began on 11 May 1994 and ended on 17 July 1994.

Clare entered the championship as the defending champions, however, they were beaten by Cork in the Munster final.

The All-Ireland final was played on 17 July 1994 at Fraher Field in Dungarvan, between Cork and Kilkenny, in what was their first meeting in the final in 78 years. Cork won the match by 2-13 to 2-11 to claim their 11th championship title overall and a first title since 1987.

Kilkenny's Ollie O'Connor was the championship's top scorer with 3-22.

== Participating teams ==
A number of teams withdrew from the provincial championships after initially expressing an interest in fielding teams. Kerry withdrew from the Munster Championship while Carlow, Kildare and Meath withdrew from the Leinster Championship. Fermanagh won the Ulster Championship but did not progress to the All-Ireland Championship.

== Results ==
=== Leinster Junior Hurling Championship ===
==== Leinster quarter-finals ====
11 May 1994 Quarter-final	Dublin	4-16 - 1-06	Louth	Parnell Park
	P Kearns 2-4, R McKenna 2-1, A Breathnach 0-3, MJ Ryan 0-3, J Morris 0-2, M Stone 0-2, D O'Brien 0-1.		P Sharkey 1-2, O Kelly 0-3, J Murphy 0-1.

11 May 1994 Quarter-final	Offaly	0-12 - 2-18	Wexford	St Brendan's Park
	O Bergin 0-5, J Dooley 0-2, P Bolger 0-2, M Spain 0-1, Conor Bryan 0-1, S Buggy 0-1.		R Quigley 1-7, S Conroy 1-5, P Flynn 0-3, D Guiney 0-1, R O'Callaghan 0-1, J Kirwan 0-1.

==== Leinster semi-finals ====
1 June 1994 Semi-final	Wexford	1-15 - 1-10	Dublin	Nowlan Park
	R Quigley 0-6, J Byrne 1-2, D Kennedy 0-4, M Connors 0-1, B Kavanagh 0-1, M Connors 0-1.		MJ Ryan 0-5, A Breathnach 1-0, E Lawlor 0-2, J Morris 0-1, B Mulhall 0-1, P Kearns 0-1.

1 June 1994 Semi-final	Kilkenny	2-20 - 0-08	Laois	Nowlan Park
	O O'Connor 0-12, P Farrell 1-4, P Treacy 1-0, E McGovern 0-2, B O'Keeffe 0-1, S Ryan 0-1.		D Cuddy 0-6, E Fennelly 0-1, F O'Sullivan 0-1.

==== Leinster final ====
19 June 1994 Final	Kilkenny	2-18 - 3-08	Wexford	Nowlan Park
	O O'Connor 1-4, D Roche 1-2, P Farrell 0-5, P Treacy 0-3, B O'Keeffe 0-2, B McGovern 0-1, S Ryan 0-1.		J Byrne 2-0, R Quigley 0-6, S Conroy 1-0, M Connors 0-1, P Byrne 0-1.

=== Munster Junior Hurling Championship ===
==== Munster first round ====
18 May 1994 First round	Limerick	3-09 - 2-17	Cork	Páirc Mac Gearailt
	S O'Neill 2-1, A Ryan 0-4, M Wallace 1-0, J O'Neill 0-1, G Galvin 0-1, S Stapleton 0-1, R Fenton 0-1.		K Murray 1-1, F McCormack 1-1, D O'Donoghue 0-4, M Sheehan 0-4, K O'Keeffe 0-2, A O'Driscoll 0-2, B Sheehan 0-1, G Buckley 0-1, B Harte 0-1.

==== Munster semi-finals ====
29 May 1994 Semi-final	Clare	3-12 - 1-12	Tipperary	Gaelic Grounds
	S Barry 2-1, M McNamara 1-3, S McNamara 0-4, D Chaplin 0-2, O Baker 0-1, K Galvin 0-1.		P O'Keeffe 1-1, E Maher 0-4, T Hogan 0-3, D Fogarty 0-2, J Darcy 0-1, M McCormack 0-1.

5 June 1994 Semi-final	Cork	3-11 - 0-05	Waterford	Gaelic Grounds
	D O'Connell 3-1, D McCarthy 0-9, R O'Sullivan 0-1.		P Bennett 0-3, E Crotty 0-1, K Walsh 0-1.	Referee: PJ Corby (Tipperary)

==== Munster final ====
19 June 1994 Final	Cork	1-10 - 1-09	Clare	Semple Stadium
	M Sheehan 1-4, B Sheehan 0-2, M McElhinney 0-1, F McCormack 0-1, G Cummins 0-1, D McCarthy 0-1.		S McNamara 1-4, R O'Hara 0-2, M McNamara 0-1, P Collins 0-1, O Baker 0-1.

=== All-Ireland Junior Hurling Championship ===
==== All-Ireland semi-finals ====
30 June 1994 Semi-final	Cork	2-12 - 4-06	Galway	Cusack Park
	K Morrison 1-0, D O'Connell 1-0, M Sheehan 0-3, G Cummins 0-2, P Kenneally 0-2, F McCormack 0-2, A O'Driscoll 0-2, R Sheehan 0-1.		M Connolly 3-2, D Gilligan 1-1, P Diviney 0-1, M McEvoy 0-1, B Uniacke 0-1.	Referee: P Horan (Offaly)

11 July 1994 Semi-final replay	Cork	1-13 - 1-09	Galway	Gaelic Grounds
	G Cummins 0-5, A O'Driscoll 1-1, F McCormack 0-4, P Kenneally 0-1, K Morrison 0-1, R Sheehan 0-1.		M Connolly 1-1, D Coen 0-3, K Clancy 0-2, C Moore 0-1, D Higgins 0-1.	Referee: P Horan (Offaly)

==== All-Ireland final ====
17 July 1994 Final	Cork	2-13 - 2-11	Kilkenny	Fraher Field
	K Morrison 1-7, A O'Driscoll 1-0, M Sheehan 0-2, D O'Connell 0-1, M Downing 0-1, P Kenneally 0-1, F McCormack 0-1.		O O'Connor 2-6, B O'Keeffe 0-2, D Roche 0-1, P Farrell 0-1, P Treacy 0-1.	Referee: S O'Meara (Offaly)

== Championship statistics ==
=== Top scorers ===
Top scorers overall

Rank	Player	County	Tally	Total	Matches	Average
1	Ollie O'Connor	Kilkenny	3-22	31	3	10.33
2	Ray Quigley	Wexford	1-19	22	3	7.33
3	Michael Sheehan	Cork	1-13	16	5	3.20
4	Michael Connolly	Galway	4-03	15	2	7.50
5	Dan O'Connell	Cork	4-02	14	3	4.66
5	Kieran Morrison	Cork	2-08	14	3	4.66
7	Patrick Farrell	Kilkenny	1-10	13	3	4.33
8	Fergal McCormack	Cork	1-09	12	6	2.00
9	John Byrne	Wexford	3-02	11	3	3.66
9	Seán Conroy	Wexford	2-05	11	3	3.66
9	Pat Kearns	Dublin	2-05	11	2	5.50
9	Adrian O'Driscoll	Cork	2-05	11	5	2.20
9	Stephen McNamara	Clare	1-08	11	2	5.50

Top scorers in a single game

Rank	Player	Club	Tally	Total	Opposition
1	Ollie O'Connor	Kilkenny	2-06	12	Cork
1	Ollie O'Connor	Kilkenny	0-12	12	Laois
3	Michael Connolly	Galway	3-02	11	Cork
4	Dan O'Connell	Cork	3-01	10	Waterford
4	Pat Kearns	Dublin	2-04	10	Louth
4	Ray Quigley	Wexford	1-07	10	Offaly
4	Kieran Morrison	Cork	1-07	10	Kilkenny
8	Damien McCarthy	Cork	0-09	9	Waterford
9	Seán Conroy	Wexford	1-05	8	Offaly
10	R. McKenna	Dublin	2-01	7	Louth
10	Shane O'Neill	Limerick	2-01	7	Cork
10	Seánie Barry	Clare	2-01	7	Tipperary
10	Patrick Farrell	Kilkenny	1-04	7	Laois
10	Ollie O'Connor	Kilkenny	1-04	7	Wexford
10	Michael Sheehan	Cork	1-04	7	Clare
10	Stephen McNamara	Clare	1-04	7	Cork
