= 1990 All-Ireland Junior Hurling Championship =

All Ireland Champions
- Winners: Kilkenny (8th win)
- Captain: Paudie Holden
- Manager: Ollie Walsh

All Ireland Runners-up
- Runners-up: Tipperary
- Captain: Ger Bradley
- Manager: Willie Sweeney

Provincial Champions
- Munster: Tipperary
- Leinster: Kilkenny
- Ulster: Armagh
- Connacht: Not Played

The 1990 All-Ireland Junior Hurling Championship was the 69th staging of the All-Ireland Junior Championship since its establishment by the Gaelic Athletic Association in 1912.

Tipperary entered the championship as the defending champions.

The All-Ireland final was played on 3 August 1990 at O'Moore Park in Portlaoise, between Kilkenny and Tipperary, in what was their first meeting in a final since 1988. Kilkenny won the match by 4-21 to 2-11 to claim their eighth championship title overall and a first title since 1988.

== Results ==
=== All-Ireland Junior Hurling Championship ===
==== All-Ireland semi-final ====
12 July 1990 Semi-final	Tipperary	2-10 - 3-05	Galway	Gaelic Grounds

14 July 1989 Semi-final	Armagh	1-02 - 3-20	Kilkenny	Athletic Grounds

==== All-Ireland final ====
3 August 1990 Final	Kilkenny	4-21 - 2-11	Tipperary	Gaelic Grounds
