= Darragh Coen =

Irish hurler

Personal information
- Native name: Darragh Ó Cadhain (Irish)
- Nickname: Stumpy
- Born: 1975 (age 50–51) Clarinbridge, County Galway, Ireland
- Height: 5 ft 7 in (170 cm)

Sport
- Sport: Hurling
- Position: Right corner-forward
Club
- Years: Club
- Clarinbridge
Club titles
- Galway titles: 1
- Connacht titles: 1
- All-Ireland Titles: 0
Inter-county*
Years	County	Apps (scores)
1997-1998	Galway	3 (1-17)
Inter-county titles
- Connacht titles: 2
- All-Irelands: 0
- NHL: 0
- All Stars: 0
- *Inter County team apps and scores correct as of 21:20, 24 April 2016.

Darragh Coen (born 1975) is an Irish retired hurler who played as a right corner-forward for the Galway senior team.

Born in Clarinbridge, County Galway, Coen first played competitive hurling in his youth. He enjoyed championship success at under-age levels with the Clarinbridge club. Landers subsequently joined the Clarinbridge senior team and won one Connacht medal and one championship medal.

Coen made his début on the inter-county scene when he first linked up with the Galway minor team. An All-Ireland medal winner in this grade, he later lined out with the under-21 team with whom he also enjoyed All-Ireland success. Coen joined the senior team during the 1997 National Hurling League. He went on to play a key role for Galway as a forward and won two Connacht medals.

Sporting positions
Preceded by Conor O'Donovan	Galway minor hurling team captain 1993	Succeeded by Greg Kennedy
