= 2016–17 All-Ireland Intermediate Club Hurling Championship =

Championship Details
- Dates: 22 October 2016 – 18 February 2017
- Teams: 22

All Ireland Champions
- Winners: Carrickshock (1 win)
- Captain: John Tennyson
- Manager: Tommy Shefflin

All Ireland Runners-up
- Runners-up: Ahascragh-Fohenagh
- Captain: Pádraic Mannion
- Manager: William Dilleen

Provincial Champions
- Munster: Lismore
- Leinster: Carrickshock
- Ulster: St Brigid's, Cloughmills
- Connacht: Ahascragh-Fohenagh

Championship Statistics
- Matches Played: 22
- Top Scorer: Maurice Shanahan (4-36)

The 2016–17 All-Ireland Intermediate Club Hurling Championship was the 13th staging of the All-Ireland Intermediate Club Hurling Championship, the Gaelic Athletic Association's intermediate inter-county club hurling tournament. The championship began on 22 October 2016 and ended on 18 February 2017.

On 18 February 2017, Carrickshock won the championship following a 2–15 to 0–6 defeat of Ahascragh-Fohenagh in the final.

== Connacht Intermediate Club Hurling Championship ==
=== Connacht semi-final ===
2 November 2016 Semi-final	Ballyhaunis	1–12 – 0–09	Oran	Connacht GAA Centre
	K Higgins 1-8, P Kiely 0-2, B Hunt 0-1, K McDermott 0-1.	Report	C Kenny 0-5, J Fallon 0-4.

=== Connacht final ===
6 November 2016 Final	Ballyhaunis	2–13 – 0–19 (aet)	Ahascragh-Fohenagh	Athleague Sportsfield
	K Higgins 1-7, J Coyne 1-0, D O'Brien 0-3, K Kiely 0-1, E Collins 0-1, S Hoban 0-1.	Report	C Mannion 0-7, S Smyth 0-4, S Kelly 0-2, E Delaney 0-2, L Tully 0-1, R Kelly 0-1, F Donnellan 0-1, M Kelly 0-1.

13 November 2016 Final replay	Ballyhaunis	0–13 – 2–20	Ahascragh-Fohenagh	Athleague Sportsfield
	K Higgins (0-8, 6f, 1'65), A Phillips (0-2), K McDermott (0-1); A Lyons (0-1), P Kiely (0-1).	Report	C Mannion (2-11, 0-4f, 0-1'65), S Smyth (0-2), R Kelly (0-2), E Delaney (0-1); J Finnerty (0-1); S Kelly (0-1), L Tully (0-1), F Donnellan (0-1).

== Leinster Intermediate Club Hurling Championship ==
=== Leinster quarter-finals ===
5 November 2016 Quarter-final	Bray Emmets	1–15 – 1–12	Castletown	Emmet Park
	C Moorehouse 0-9, M Lennon 1-0, M Lee 0-3, D Masterson 0-2, B McCormack 0-1.		Conroy 0-6, G Coughlan 1-0, R Mullaney 0-2, P Mullaney 0-1, C Phelan 0-1, M Phelan 0-1, J Hooban 0-1.

5 November 2016 Quarter-final	Raheny	2–15 – 2–20	Celbridge	O'Toole Park
		Report	G Keegan 1-11.

5 November 2016 Quarter-final	Kiltale	2–24 – 2–08	Oylegate-Glenbrien	St. Loman's Park
	J Regan 0-8, P Durnin 1-3, R Ryan 1-3, J Kelly 0-4, M O'Sullivan 0-3, A Forde 0-2, K Ryan 0-1.		P Doran 1-1, C Heffernan 1-1, S Casey 0-2, J Reck 0-1, C Doyle 0-1, J White 0-1, C Lambert 0-1.

=== Leinster semi-finals ===
19 November 2016 Semi-final	Bray Emmets	0–13 – 0–15	Celbridge	Emmet Park
	C Moorehouse 0-5, M Lennon 0-3, D Masterson 0-2, R Cunningham 0-1, P Cunningham 0-1, E Forde 0-1.	Report	G Keegan 0-8, F Conway 0-2, M Moloney 0-2, T Fitzgerald 0-2, P Moloney 0-1.

19 November 2016 Semi-final	Kilatle	2–09 – 2–12	Carrickshock	St. Loman's Park
	J Regan 1-6; J Kelly 1-0; E Ryan 0-1; M O'Sullivan 0-1; J Kelly 0-1.	Report	D Brennan 1-1; M O'Dwyer 1-1; M Rice 0-4; J Butler 0-2; R Power 0-1; K Farrell 0-1; J Power 0-1; D Walsh 0-1.

=== Leinster final ===
3 December 2016 Final	Celbridge	1–16 – 3–12	Carrickshock	St. Conleth's Park
	G Keegan 0-10 (6f), T Fitzgerald 1-0, F Conway 0-2, L Quinn 0-2, M Maloney 0-1, S White 0-1	Report	K Farrell 1-7 (4f), J Dalton 1-0, M Rohan 1-0, J Tennyson 0-1, B Donovan 0-1, M O’Dwyer 0-1, J Power 0-1, J Butler 0-1.

== Munster Intermediate Club Hurling Championship ==
=== Munster quarter-finals ===
22 October 2016 Quarter-final	Monaleen	2–21 – 3–13 (aet)	St. Joseph's Doora-Barefield	Gaelic Grounds
	A La Touche Cosgrave 1-12, G Collins 1-2, E Doyle 0-1, S Mullane 0-1, P Russell 0-1, J Nicholas 0-1, L Lyons 0-1, M O'Dwyer 0-1, D Golden 0-1.		T Hannan 2-4, A O'Neill 1-2, D Conroy 0-4, N de Loughrey 0-1, L Duggan 0-1, B Guilfoyle 0-1.	Referee: J Larkin (Cork)

30 October 2016 Quarter-final	Bandon	1–12 – 2–20	Lismore	Cloughduv Grounds
	R Crowley (0-8, 6 frees, 2 65); M McNamara 1-0, J Harrington, E O’Donovan, D Crowley, A Murphy 0-1 each.	Report	M Shanahan (2-10, 3 frees, 1 65); R Barry (0-3, frees); D Shanahan (0-2); S Barry, J Prendergast, B Landers, J Prendergast, P O’Keeffe (0-1 each).	Referee: F Horgan (Tipperary)

=== Munster semi-finals ===
5 November 2016 Semi-final	Lismore	1–15 – 1–12	Newport	Fraher Field
	M Shanahan (1-8, 0-7 frees); D Shanahan (0-2), J Prendergast (0-2); B Landers (0-1), J Prendergast (0-1), P Prendergast (0-1).	Report	D Carew (0-4, 0-3 frees), P Ryan (0-3), E McCormack (1-0), M Carey (0-1), D Carroll (0-1 free); S O’Connor (0-1); P O’Sullivan (0-1), O Floyd (0-1).	Referee: D O'Driscoll (Limerick)

6 November 2016 Semi-final	Monaleen	0–13 – 4–12	Kilmoyley	Gaelic Grounds
	M O’Dwyer (0-8, 7 frees), G Gollins and S Mullane (0-2 each), J Nicholas (0-1).	Report	D Collins (1-7, 4 frees), M O’Connor (2-1), A Royle (1-0), J McGelligott (0-2), R Collins and J Godley (0-1 each).	Referee: C Lyons (Cork)

=== Munster final ===
19 November 2016 Final	Lismore	2–14 – 0–13	Kilmoyley	Mallow GAA Complex
	M Shanahan 1-9 (0-6 frees, 0-1 65), P O’Keeffe 1-0, J Prendergast, B Landers, J Prendergast, D Shanahan 0-1 each.	Report	D Collins 0-13 (0-8 frees).	Referee: R McCann (Clare)

== Ulster Intermediate Club Hurling Championship ==
=== Ulster quarter-final ===
30 October 2016 Quarter-final	St Brigid's, Cloughmills	2–18 – 1–15	Eire Óg Carrickmore	St. Patrick's Park
	O Kinney 2-3, M Devlin 0-7, L Kearns 0-4, L Cassidy 0-1.		D Begley 0-9, S Óg Grogan 1-1, R McKernan 0-3, G Fox 0-1, C Grogan 0-1

=== Ulster semi-finals ===
5 November 2016 Semi-final	Eoghan Rua	1–18 – 2–04	Bredagh	St. Patrick's Park
	SL McGoldrick 0-11, Ciarán McGoldrick 1-1, Colm McGoldrick 0-3, B McGoldrick 0-1, R Leonard 0-1, R Mooney 0-1.		C Mac Suibhne 1-1, I Galway 1-0, E Trainor 0-2, E Donnelly 0-1.

13 November 2016 Semi-final	Keady Lámh Dhearg	0–11 – 1–14	St Brigid's, Cloughmills	Owenbeg COE
	P Breen 0-5, C Corvan 0-3, R Conway 0-1, S Reneghan 0-1, P McCormack 0-1.		M Devlin 0-7, J Doherty 1-1, L Casserly 0-3, C Laverty 0-1, G Laverty 0-1, L Kearns 0-1.

=== Ulster final ===
20 November 2016 Final	St Brigid's, Cloughmills	1–11 – 2–06	Eoghan Rua	Slemish Park
	L Cassley (1-3), M Devlin (0-2, 1f), L Kearns (0-2, 1f); O Kinney (0-2), J Doherty (0-1), G Og Laverty (0-1).	Report	SL McGoldrick (0-4, 3f), Colm McGoldrick (1-0), L McGoldrick (1-0f), R Mooney (0-2).

== All-Ireland Intermediate Club Hurling Championship ==
=== All-Ireland quarter-final ===
14 January 2017 Quarter-final	Robert Emmetts	0–16 – 0–14 (aet)	St Brigid's, Cloughmills	Tír Chonaill Park
	R Murphy (0–12 frees), D Roberts (0–2), T Lawrence (0–2).	Report	M Devlin (0–9, 0–7 frees, 0–1 65), L Kearns (0–3 frees), S Smyth (0–2).	Referee: J Keane (Galway)

=== All-Ireland semi-finals ===
29 January 2017 Semi-final	Ahascragh-Fohenagh	1–17 – 0–13	Lismore	O'Connor Park
	C Mannion (0–12, 8f), L Cosgrove (1–1), R Kelly (0–3), P Mannion (0–1, f).	Report	M Shanahan (0–9, 8f), John Prendergast (0–2), J Shanahan; B Landers (0–1), Jack Prendergast (0–1).	Referee: M Murtagh (Westmeath)

29 January 2017 Semi-final	Carrickshock	0–18 – 1–09	Robert Emmetts	O'Moore Park
	K Farrell 0–6 (5 f), J Butler, D Walsh 0–3 each, R Power 0–2, J Grace, J Power, M O'Dwyer, D Brennan 0–1 each.	Report	E Chawke 0–8 (7), C Kehoe 1–0, R Costello 0–1.	Referee: J Murphy (Limerick)

=== All-Ireland final ===
18 February 2017 Final	Carrickshock	2–15 – 0–06	Ahascragh-Fohenagh	Croke Park
	R Power 0–6 (0-1f), D Walsh 1–1, J Power 1–0 (1–0 pen), D Brennan, K Farrell 0–2 each (0-2f), J Power, M Rice, M O’Dwyer and P Tennyson 0–1 each.	Report	C Mannion 0–5 (0-3f), L Cosgrove 0–1.	Referee: G McGrath (Wexford)

== Championship statistics ==
=== Top scorers ===
Rank	Player	Club	Tally	Total	Matches	Average
1	Maurice Shanahan	Lismore	4-36	48	4	12.00
2	Cathal Mannion	Ahascragh-Fohenagh	2-35	41	4	10.25
3	Gerry Keegan	Celbridge	1-29	32	3	10.66
4	Keith Higgins	Ballyhaunis	2-23	29	3	9.66
5	Michael Devlin	St Brigid's Cloughmills	0-25	25	4	6.25
6	Daniel Collins	Kilmoyley	1-20	23	2	11.50
7	Kevin Farrell	Carrickshock	1-16	19	4	4.75
8	Jack Regan	Kiltale	1-14	17	2	8.50
9	Andrew La Touche Cosgrave	Monaleen	1-12	15	1	15.00
9	Seán Leo McGoldrick	Eoghan Rua	0-15	15	2	7.50
