= Bobby O'Regan =

Irish hurler

Personal information
- Native name: Liam Ó Ríogáin (Irish)
- Nickname: Bobby
- Born: William O'Regan; 10 June 1920 Belgooly, County Cork, Ireland
- Died: 17 November 2012 (aged 92) Kinsale, County Cork, Ireland
- Occupation: Farmer

Sport
- Sport: Hurling
- Position: Midfield
Clubs
- Years: Club
- Ballymartle → Carrigdhoun
Club titles
- Cork titles: 0
Inter-county
Years	County	Apps (scores)
1942-1946	Cork	3 (0-00)
Inter-county titles
- Munster titles: 2
- All-Irelands: 1
- NHL: 0

William O'Regan (10 June 1920 – 17 November 2012), known as Bobby O'Regan, was an Irish hurler who played for Cork Championship club Ballymartle. He was also a member of the Cork senior hurling team at various times and usually lined out at midfield or as a forward.

== Career ==
O'Regan first came to prominence as a hurler at club level with Ballymartle. His prowess earned him selection on the Carrigdhoun divisional team and he was at midfield when they were beaten by Glen Rovers in the 1945 Cork SHC final. He won a County Junior Championship medal with Ballymartle in the twilight of his career in 1952. O'Regan was first selected for the Cork senior hurling team in 1942. He made a number of appearances throughout the championship and was a member of the reserves when Cork beat Dublin in the 1942 All-Ireland final. O'Regan was briefly recalled to the team in 1946 and won a second Munster Championship medal.

== Personal life and death ==
O'Regan was born in Belgooly, County Cork in June 1920. He spent his entire working life as a farmer and was also a life-long member of Fianna Fáil. O'Regan married Kitty O'Leary in 1950 and had six children.

O'Regan died in Kinsale on 17 November 2012.

== Honours ==
Ballymartle

- Cork Junior Hurling Championship: 1952

Cork

- All-Ireland Senior Hurling Championship: 1942
- Munster Senior Hurling Championship: 1942, 1946
