= 2006 Cork Intermediate Hurling Championship =

Irish hurling competition

- Dates: 6 May 2006 – 4 February 2007
- Teams: 16
- Sponsor: Evening Echo
- Champions: Ballymartle (1st title); Rory Dwyer (captain); Brendan Murphy (manager)
- Runners-up: Carrigaline; Geoff Dillon (captain); Kevin O'Driscoll (manager)
- Relegated: Nemo Rangers

Tournament statistics
- Matches played: 31
- Goals scored: 67 (2.16 per match)
- Points scored: 809 (26.1 per match)
- Top scorer(s): James Masters (1-31)

The 2006 Cork Intermediate Hurling Championship was the 97th staging of the Cork Intermediate Hurling Championship since its establishment by the Cork County Board in 1909. The draw for the opening round fixtures took place on 11 December 2005. The championship began on 6 May 2006 and ended on 4 February 2007.

This was the first championship to feature relegation, with Nemo Rangers becoming the first team to suffer relegation after losing their championship proper games and two play-off games.

On 10 September 2006, Ballymartle won the championship after a 1–23 to 1–19 defeat of Carrigaline in the final at Páirc Uí Chaoimh. It remains their only championship title in the grade.

Nemo Rangers' James Masters was the championship's top scorer with 1-31.

== Team changes ==
=== To Championship ===
Promoted from the Cork Junior A Hurling Championship

- Fr. O'Neill's

=== From Championship ===
Promoted to the Cork Premier Intermediate Hurling Championship

- Argideen Rangers

== Results ==
=== First round ===
6 May 2006 First round	St. Vincent's	1-12 - 1-13	Milford	Mill Field
	C Barry 1-7, A Buckley 0-2, K Collins 0-1, S Ray 0-1, F Murphy 0-1.		O Dillon 0-7, S O'Connell 1-1, J O'Brien 0-2, B Sexton 0-1, R Geary 0-1, M Savage 0-1.

6 May 2006 First round	Kilbrittain	1-15 - 3-08	Cobh	Páirc Liam Mhic Cárthaigh
	E Sheehy 1-2, A Hayes 0-5, V O'Brien 0-2, F Hickey 0-2, E Sexton 0-1, J Deasy 0-1, R Cashman 0-1, C O'Leary 0-1.		G Meaney 0-5, B Ahern 1-1, V O'Rourke 1-0, E Wilson 1-0, D Barrett 0-1, P Meaney 0-1.

6 May 2006 First round	Fr. O'Neill's	0-10 - 3-08	Dromina	Shanballymore
	G O'Leary 0-5, E Conway 0-2, R Murphy 0-1, E Holland 0-1, K Wall 0-1.		R Crowley 1-2, A O'Shaughnessy 1-2, P Hayes 1-0, G Healy 0-2, D Morrissey 0-1, P Gould 0-1.

7 May 2006 First round	Ballymartle	1-16 - 0-14	Bandon	Páirc Uí Ríogáin
	R Dwyer 0-9, G Cummins 1-3, B Dwyer 0-2, B Corry 0-1, P Dwyer 0-1.		D Lucey 0-7, D Crowley 0-3, J Hickey 0-2, K Walsh 0-1, J O'Donovan 0-1.

9 May 2006 First round	Kanturk	1-12 - 0-13	Éire Óg	Páirc Eoin Mhic Charthaigh
	A Nash 1-1, L McLoughlin 0-4, F Browne 0-2, E Aherne 0-2, J Murphy 0-2, A Walsh 0-1.		J Crowley 0-9, T Dineen 0-1, T O'Leary 0-1, J Malone 0-1, F Sheehan 0-1.

12 May 2006 First round	Valley Rovers	1-12 - 0-15	Carrigaline	Riverstick
	R Butler 0-5, C O'Donovan 1-0, K Canty 0-3, R O'Donovan 0-2, T Fitzgerald 0-2.		B O'Driscoll 0-4, V Cooney 0-3, P Murphy 0-2, R Keohane 0-2, W O'Brien 0-2, P Foster 0-1, S Corcoran 0-1.

14 May 2006 First round	Ballygarvan	0-16 - 1-12	Blackrock	Carrigaline
	L Dillon 0-9, G White 0-4, S White 0-2, D Bouse 0-1.		E Kiely 0-5, I Walsh 1-1, B Cashman 0-2, TJ Coughlan 0-1, P O'Sullivan 0-1, G Cleary 0-1, E O'Brien 0-1.

24 May 2006 First round	Nemo Rangers	1-09 - 2-10	Glen Rovers	Páirc Uí Rinn
	W Morgan 0-4, J Coogan 1-0, J Masters 0-3, M Cronin 0-1, D Niblock 0-1.		D Busteed 1-3, E Cronin 1-3, D O'Callaghan 0-3, D Goggin 0-1.

25 May 2006 First round replay	Valley Rovers	0-15 - 1-11	Carrigaline	Páirc Liam Mhic Cárthaigh
	R Butler 0-6, K Canty 0-3, E Collins 0-2, R O'Donovan 0-2, T Fitzgerald 0-1, B Lehane 0-1.		P Murphy 1-2, V Cooney 0-3, T Murphy 0-2, P Foster 0-1, J Moran 0-1, A Kelly 0-1, B O'Driscoll 0-1.

=== Second round ===
27 May 2006 Second round	Bandon	3-19 - 3-10	Cobh	Shanbally
	D Lucey 1-9, D Burke 1-1, A Johnson 1-0, D O'Donoghue 0-3, D Crowley 0-3, J O'Regan 0-1, J Hickey 0-1, G O'Riordan 0-1.		J Meaney 2-3, B Ahern 1-3, P Meaney 0-3, D Barrett 0-1.

3 June 2006 Second round	Blackrock	3-09 - 0-18	Éire Óg	Páirc Liam Mhic Cárthaigh
	P O'Sullian 1-2, J Young 1-2, G Cleary 1-1, B Cashman 0-2, E Kiely 0-1, M Drummond 0-1.		C Sheehan 0-9, J Crowley 0-4, B O'Neill 0-1, T O'Leary 0-1, G O'Flynn 0-1, A O'Mahony 0-1, D Goudling 0-1.

14 June 2006 Second round	St. Vincent's	0-09 - 2-16	Carrigaline	Riverstick
	C Barry 0-6, S Ray 0-2, JP Murphy 0-1.		T Murphy 1-4, S Corcoran 1-2, V Cooney 0-3, E O'Keeffe 0-2, B O'Driscoll 0-1, J Moran 0-1, P Murphy 0-1, W O'Brien 0-1, M O'Sullivan 0-1.

14 June 2006 Second round replay	Blackrock	0-08 - 1-13	Éire Óg	Páirc Liam Mhic Cárthaigh
	P O'Sullivan 0-6, B Ahern 0-1, E Kiely 0-1.		J Crowley 1-6, D Goulding 0-3, G O'Flynn 0-2, J Malone 0-1, D O'Flynn 0-1.

18 June 2006 Second round	Fr. O'Neill's	1-18 - 2-02	Nemo Rangers	Páirc Uí Chonaill
	J Holland 1-7, E Conway 0-3, J Flavin 0-3, P Butler 0-2, Q Higgins 0-2, C Buckley 0-1		D Creedon 1-0, P Morgan 1-0, J Masters 0-2.

=== Third round ===
10 June 2006 Third round	Valley Rovers	1-16 - 1-16	Bandon	Páirc Uí Ríogáin
	R Butler 0-7, K Canty 1-2, R O'Donovan 0-2, B Lehane 0-2, E Collins 0-1, J Young 0-1, J Hurley 0-1.		D Lucey 0-10, J O'Regan 1-0, J Hickey 0-2, K Hurley 0-1, T Bambury 0-1, D Burke 0-1, D O'Donoghue 0-1.

18 June 2006 Third round	Dromina	1-18 - 1-16	Ballygarvan	Castletownroche
	A O'Shaughnessy 0-8, G Healy 1-1, P Gould 0-3, K Hayes 0-3, R Crowley 0-2, P Hayes 0-1.		L Dillon 1-7, D Bouse 0-3, S White 0-2, D O'Sullivan 0-2, C Ó Conchúir 0-1.

21 June 2006 Third round	Milford	2-11 - 1-09	Kanturk	Dromina
	N Geary 1-1, M Morrissey 1-0, P O'Regan 0-3, J O'Brien 0-2, E Dillon 0-2, S O'Connell 0-1, M O'Connell 0-1, M Savage 0-1.		A NAsh 1-0, L McLoughlin 0-3, F Browne 0-2, J Healy 0-1, E Aherne 0-1, A Walsh 0-1, D McCarthy 0-1.

2 July 2006 Third round	Ballymartle	1-15 - 0-09	Fr. O'Neill's	Páirc Uí Rinn
	G Cummins 1-3, A McCarthy 0-2, C Sheehan 0-2, B Dwyer 0-2, R Dwyer 0-2, D Dwyer 0-1, J Kelly 0-1, K Lordan 0-1, B Corry 0-1.		G O'Leary 0-3, E Conway 0-2, E Holland 0-1, J Flavin 0-1, C Buckley 0-1, P Butler 0-1.

2 July 2006 Third round replay	Valley Rovers	2-14 - 1-08	Bandon	Páirc Uí Ríogáin
	E Collins 1-3, R Butler 0-6, K Canty 1-1, R O'Donovan 0-2, B Lehane 0-1, J Hurley 0-1.		D Crowley 1-0, D O'Donoghue 0-3, D Lucey 0-2, A Johnson 0-1, D Cronin 0-1, J Burke 0-1.

=== Relegation playoffs ===
23 June 2006 Semi-final	Blackrock	1-10 - 1-13	St. Vincent's	Bishopstown
	E O'Brien 0-6, B Cashman 1-1, P O'Sullivan 0-2, I Walsh 0-1.		J Daly 1-3, C Barry 0-4, J Buckley 0-2, D O'Connor 0-2, S Ray 0-1, F Murphy 0-1.

23 July 2006 Semi-final	Cobh	2-08 - 0-14	Nemo Rangers	Riverstown
	E Wilson 1-2, B Meaney 1-1, D Barrett 0-2, W Greaney 0-2, J Meaney 0-1.		A Cronin 0-3, J Masters 0-3, M Cronin 0-2, W Morgan 0-2, D Niblock 0-2, J Griffin 0-1, P O'Shea 0-1.

1 September 2006 Semi-final replay	Cobh	1-16 - 1-13	Nemo Rangers	Páirc Uí Rinn
	D Barrett 0-5, B Meaney 1-2, E Wilson 0-3, G Meaney 0-3, L Greaney 0-1, R Meaney 0-1, P Meaney 0-1.		J Masters 1-10, A Cronin 0-1, D Niblock 0-1, J Griffin 0-1.

4 February 2007 Final	Blackrock	1-12 - 0-14	Nemo Rangers	Páirc Uí Rinn
	B Cashman 1-4, P O'Sullivan 0-3, I Walsh 0-2, M O'Donoghue 0-1, G Buckley 0-1, D O'Shea 0-1.		J Masters 0-13, B Twomey 0-1.

=== Quarter-finals ===
24 June 2006 Quarter-final	Kilbrittain	2-20 - 1-11	Glen Rovers	Belgooly
	D O'Connell 1-8, A Hayes 1-2, V O'Brien 0-2, R Cashman 0-2, J Deasy 0-2, D Hickey 0-1, P Ryan 0-1, P Hurley 0-1, E Sheedy 0-1.		O McCarthy 0-4, S O'Brien 1-0, G Moylan 0-2, L Lynch 0-1, D Busteed 0-1, G Looney 0-1, C Buckley 0-1, D O'Callaghan 0-1.

21 July 2006 Quarter-final	Carrigaline	0-12 - 0-07	Éire Óg	Páirc Uí Rinn
	S Corcoran 0-8, P Murphy 0-2, N Murphy 0-1, W O'Brien 0-1.		J Hurley 0-4, D Herlihy 0-1, D Corkery 0-1, T O'Leary 0-1.

21 July 2006 Quarter-final	Valley Rovers	0-16 - 1-10	Dromina	Banteer
	R Butler 0-4, J Young 0-3, K Canty 0-2, E Collins 0-2, R O'Donovan 0-2, E O'Sullivan 0-1, J Hurley 0-1, N O'Donovan 0-1.		A O'Shaughnessy 0-8, P Hayes 1-0, K Hayes 0-1, P Gould 0-1.

23 July 2006 Quarter-final	Ballymartle	0-19 - 2-13	Milford	Ballyhooly
	R Dwyer 0-5, G Cummins 0-4, B Dwyer 0-3, B Corry 0-2, P Coughlan 0-2, C Sheehan 0-1, K Lordan 0-1, D Dwyer 0-1.		P O'Regan 1-3, R Geary 0-3, J O'Brien 0-2, N Geary 0-2, E Dillin 0-2, M Cremin 0-1.

12 August 2006 Quarter-final replay	Ballymartle	3-17 - 0-13	Milford	Ballyhooly
	G Cummins 1-5, R O'Dwyer 0-5, S Coleman 1-1, D Dwyer 1-0, B Dwyer 0-3, A McCarthy 0-1, B Corry 0-1, M O'Mahony 0-1.		P O'Regan 0-7, E Dillon 0-3, R Geary 0-2, B Sexton 0-1.

=== Semi-finals ===
23 August 2006 Semi-final	Ballymartle	1-12 - 0-12	Valley Rovers	Páirc Uí Rinn
	B Dwyer 0-7, G Cummins 1-1, R Dwyer 0-2, S Coleman 0-1, P Coughlan 0-1.		R Butler 0-6, K Canty 0-3, E Manning 0-1, R O'Donovan 0-1, T Fitzgerald 0-1.

25 August 2006 Semi-final	Carrigaline	3-15 - 2-15	Kilbrittain	Páirc Uí Rinn
	T Murphy 2-2, S Corcoran 0-8, P Foster 1-1, V Cooney 0-1, J Moran 0-1, P Murphy 0-1, W O'Brien 0-1.		D O'Connell 0-6, M Sexton 1-0, R Cashman 1-0, V O'Brien 0-2, F Hickey 0-2, P Ryan 0-1, J Deasy 0-1, E Sheehy 0-1, P Sexton 0-1, A Hayes 0-1.

=== Final ===
10 September 2006 Final	Ballymartle	1-23 - 1-19	Carrigaline	Páirc Uí Chaoimh
	B Dwyer 0-6, G Cummins 1-2, P Coughlan 0-5, B Corry 0-3, D Dwyer 0-2, R Dwyer 0-2, A McCarthy 0-1, S Coleman 0-1, J Kelly 0-1.		S Corcoran 0-9, N Murphy 1-3, E O'Brien 0-2, E O'Keeffe 0-2, J Moran 0-1, P Foster 0-1, A Kelly 0-1.

== Championship statistics ==
=== Top scorers ===
Overall

Rank	Player	Club	Tally	Total	Matches	Average
1	James Masters	Nemo Rangers	1-31	34	5	6.80
1	Richard Butler	Valley Rovers	0-34	34	6	5.66
2	Ger Cummins	Ballymartle	5-18	33	6	5.50
3	Donagh Lucey	Bandon	1-28	31	4	7.75
3	Stephen Corcoran	Carrigaline	1-28	31	5	6.20
4	Barry Dwyer	Ballymartle	0-23	23	6	3.83
5	John Crowley	Éire Óg	1-19	22	3	7.33
6	Andrew O'Shaughnessy	Dromina	1-18	21	3	7.00
7	Kevin Canty	Valley Rovers	2-14	20	5	4.00
7	Cian Barry	St. Vincent's	1-17	20	3	6.66
7	Rory Dwyer	Ballymartle	0-20	20	5	4.00

In a single game

Rank	Player	Club	Tally	Total	Opposition
1	James Masters	Nemo Rangers	1-10	13	Cobh
1	James Masters	Nemo Rangers	0-13	13	Blackrock
2	Donagh Lucey	Bandon	1-09	12	Cobh
3	Dan O'Connell	Kilbrittain	1-08	11	Glen Rovers
4	Cian Barry	St. Vincent's	1-07	10	Milford
4	Jerry Holland	Fr. O'Neill's	1-07	10	Nemo Rangers
4	Liam Dillon	Ballygarvan	1-07	10	Dromina
4	Donagh Lucey	Bandon	0-10	10	Valley Rovers
5	Jeremiah Meaney	Cobh	2-03	9	Bandon
5	John Crowley	Éire Óg	1-06	9	Blackrock
5	Rory Dwyer	Ballymartle	0-09	9	Bandon
5	John Crowley	Éire Óg	0-09	9	Kanturk
5	Liam Dillon	Ballygarvan	0-09	9	Blackrock
5	Ciarán Sheehan	Éire Óg	0-09	9	Blackrock
5	Stephen Corcoran	Carrigaline	0-09	9	Ballymartle
