= 2018–19 All-Ireland Junior Club Hurling Championship =

Indian Bridal

Championship Details
- Dates: 14 October 2018 - 10 February 2019
- Teams: 29

All Ireland Champions
- Winners: Dunnamaggin (1st win)
- Captain: William Phelan
- Manager: Eamonn Kennedy

All Ireland Runners-up
- Runners-up: Castleblayney
- Captain: Peter Treanor
- Manager: Jimmy Lacey

Provincial Champions
- Munster: Cloughduv
- Leinster: Dunnamaggin
- Ulster: Castleblayney
- Connacht: Carrick Hurling Club

Championship Statistics
- Matches Played: 28
- Total Goals: 74 (2.64 per game)
- Total Points: 755 (26.96 per game)
- Top Scorer: Fergal Rafter (3-48)

The 2018–19 All-Ireland Junior Club Hurling Championship was the 16th staging of the All-Ireland Junior Club Hurling Championship, the Gaelic Athletic Association's junior inter-county club hurling tournament. The championship ran from 14 October 2018 to 10 February 2019.

The All-Ireland final was played on 10 February 2019 at Croke Park in Dublin, between Dunnamaggin from Kilkenny and Castleblayney from Monaghan, in what was their first ever meeting in the final. Dunnamaggin won the match by 1-17 to 1-13 to claim their first ever championship title.

Castleblayney's Fergal Rafter was the championship's top scorer with 3-48.

== Connacht Junior Club Hurling Championship ==
=== Connacht semi-final ===
29 October 2018 Semi-final	Carrick Hurling Club	0-16 - 1-08	Coolera/Strandhill	Páirc Seán Mac Diarmada
	C Cunniffe 0-8, 1 65, 6f; L Moreton 0-3; S Goldrick 0-2; C McCrann, J Glancy & C Moreton 0-1 each.	Report	E Comerford 0-6, 5f; C Brennan 1-0; F O’Flynn 0-2, 1f

=== Connacht final ===
3 November 2018 Final	Carrick Hurling Club	2-11 - 2-09	Ballygar	Connacht GAA Centre
	C Cunniffe 1-6, 4f; C McCrann 1-0; C Moreton 0-2; S Goldrick, D Molloy (f) & D Byrne 0-1 each	= Report	P McDonagh 0-5, 5f; D O’Brien (f) & E Walsh 1-1 each; A Gavin & D Nolan 0-1 each

== Leinster Junior Club Hurling Championship ==
=== Leinster first round ===
20 October 2018 First round	Knockbridge	2-16 - 1-14	Maynooth	Dowdallshill
	S Fennell 2-7 C Deane 0-3, G McKeown 0-3, L Molloy 0-1, A Smyth 0-1, G Hall 0-1.	= Report

20 October 2018 First round	St. Maur's	3-14 - 0-13	Slieve Bloom	Thomas Ashe Park
	JM Sheridan 0-5, O Kelleher 1-1, E Conroy 1-1, F Harford 1-0, P McAllister 0-3, P Sheridan 0-1, G Weldon 0-1, C Harford 0-1.		B Conroy 0-6, C Conroy 0-3, G Conroy 0-2, R Holmes 0-1, J Lowry 0-1.

20 October 2018 First round	Clara	3-12 - 3-19	Na Fianna	Bord na Móna O'Connor Park
	J Fleming 0-9, B Cushen 1-1, C O'Meara 1-0, C Stewart 1-0, C Doyle 0-2.		B Slevin 0-9, M Slevin 2-3, S Martin 1-1, R Byrne 0-2, P Slevin 0-2, C Slattery 0-1, S Martin 0-1.

26 October 2018 First round	Avondale	1-11 - 0-19	Wolfe Tones	Allen Park
	P Gahan 1-3, E Kearns 0-6, G Murphy 0-1.		J Newman 0-13, S Hannon 0-2, S Noonan 0-2, M Coyle 0-1, M Hussey 0-1.

=== Leinster quarter-finals ===
3 November 2018 Quarter-final	Knockbridge	0-07 - 2-21	Dunnamaggin	Dowdallshill
			E Kearney 0-10, J Fitzpatrick 1-2, R Coffey 1-1, M Cody 0-3, D Fitzpatrick 0-3, W Phelan 0-1, R Cody 0-1.

3 November 2018 Quarter-final	Na Fianna	6-14 - 1-10	Crookedwood	St. Loman's Park
	M Slevin 3-3, B Slevin 1-5, P Slevin 1-3, R Byrne 1-1, S Martin 0-2.		B O'Mara 1-5, S McGovern 0-2, J Nally 0-1, C Savage 0-1.

4 November 2018 Quarter-final	Wolfe Tones	2-07 - 2-19	Taghmon-Camross	Netwatch Cullen Park
	P Cullen 2-0, J Newman 0-3, S Hannon 0-2, M Coyle 0-2.		C Doyle 0-9, S O'Gorman 1-1, J Dunne 1-0, L Sinnott 0-3, TJ Codd 0-2, I Carty 0-1, D Carty 0-1, T Furlong 0-1, S O'Keeffe 0-1.

10 November 2018 Quarter-final	St. Maur's	1-22 - 1-09	Erin's Own	Thomas Ashe Park
	JM Sheridan 0-10, O Kelleher 1-5, E Conroy 0-2, A Kennedy 0-2, F Butterly 0-1, P Sheridan 0-1, C Harford 0-1.		L Galway 1-3, D Milley 0-5, A Corcoran 0-1.

=== Leinster semi-finals ===
17 November 2018 Semi-final	Dunnamaggin	1-25 - 0-08	St. Maur's	John Locke Park
	R Coffey 1-7, T Maher 0-7, E Kearney 0-4, A Fitzpatrick 0-3, J Fitzpatrick 0-2, D Fitzpatrick 0-1, M Cody 0-1.	Report	O Kelleher 0-3, E Conroy 0-2, P Sheridan 0-1, J Higgins 0-1, G Weldon 0-1.

17 November 2018 Semi-final	Na Fianna	3-12 - 2-13	Taghmon-Camross	Nowlan Park
	B Slevin 0-7, R Byrne 2-0, S Walsh 1-0, S Martin 0-2, M Slevin 0-2, E Devine 0-1.	Report	S O'Gorman 2-3, B O'Gorman 0-3, C Cullen 0-2, D Carty 0-2, I Carty 0-2, M O'Gorman 0-1.

=== Leinster final ===
1 December 2018 Final	Dunnamaggin	3-17 - 1-11	Na Fianna	Nowlan Park
	R Coffey (2-5), J Fitzpatrick (1-3), T Maher (0-3, frees), D Fitzpatrick (0-2), E Kearney (0-1, free), M Cody, A Kearney, A Fitzpatrick (0-1 each).	Report	B Slevin (1-4, goal free, two points frees, one 65), P Slevin (0-3), E Devine (0-2), J McCloskey, M Slevin (0-1 each).	Referee: K Brady (Louth)

== Munster Junior Club Hurling Championship ==
=== Munster quarter-final ===
10 November 2018 Quarter-final	Tournafulla	1-22 - 2-09	Kilgarvan	Tournafulla
	A Hartnett 0-14, P Smith 1-1, C O'Sullivan 0-3, C Moroney 0-2, M O'Mahony 0-1, E Moroney 0-1.		D O'Sullivan 1-3, S Godfrey 0-6, K Harrington 1-0.	Referee: K Jordan (Tipperary)

- Boherlahan-Dualla received a bye in this round as there were no Clare representatives.

=== Munster semi-finals ===
17 November 2018 Semi-final	Ballinameela	1-15 - 0-14	Tournafulla	Fraher Field, Dungarvan
	Brendan Phelan 0-8, J Curran 1-1, T Curran 0-3, C Culloo 0-2, L O'Brien 0-1.		A Hartnett 0-10, C O'Sullivan 0-2, E O'Sullivan 0-1, C Moroney 0-1.	Referee: J Mullins (Clare)

17 November 2018 Semi-final	Boherlahan-Dualla	0-12 - 1-16	Cloughduv	Boherlahan
	T Ryan 0-5, D Hickey 0-4, W Hickey 0-1, J Kirby 0-1, C O'Dwyer 0-1.		B Verling 0-10, J Moynihan 1-1, M Walsh 0-2, D O'Leary 0-1, J Ryan 0-1, L Long 0-1.	Referee: M Sexton (Limerick)

=== Munster final ===
2 December 2018 Final	Cloughduv	0-17 - 0-11	Ballinameela	Mallow GAA Complex, Mallow
	B Verling (0-9, 0-7 frees), M Walsh, M Verling and J Ryan (0-2 each), J Moynihan and A Cronin (0-1 each).	Report	Brendan Phelan (0-6, 0-5 frees), P Curran (0-2), J Curran and Brian Phelan (0-1 each).	Referee: J Mullins (Clare)

== Ulster Senior Club Hurling Championship ==
=== Ulster quarter-finals ===
14 October 2018 Quarter-final	Naomh Colum Cille	0-06 - 2-14	Clonduff	Brockagh
	P McCusker 0-3, C Kearns 0-3.		P Grant 2-0, R Branagan 0-4, C Young 0-3, P Branagan Jnr 0-1, S Downey 0-1, M Downey 0-1, J Murphy 0-1, J Lynch 0-1, J Lowry 0-1, L McParlan 0-1.

14 October 2018 Quarter-final	Robert Emmets	2-16 - 0-10	Na Magha	Slemish Park
	C McHugh (0-9 frees); J Morgan (1-1), D O’Hara (1-0), D McQuillan (0-2); C McNeill (0-1 free), E McQuillan (0-1), E Duffin (0-1), D Kilgore (0-1).	Report	D Foley (0-7 frees), B Quigley (0-1), F McAnaney (0-1); T Rankin (0-1 free).

14 October 2018 Quarter-final	Burt	0-13 - 4-09	Castleblayney	O'Donnell Park
	N Campbell (0-8, 6f), R McDermott (0-2); C Brady (0-1), M McCann (0-1), C Dowds (0-1).	Report	F Rafter (1-7, 0-3f), H Byrne (2-2), B McGuigan (1-0).

20 October 2018 Quarter-final	Mullahoran St. Joseph's	1-08 - 0-13	Seán Treacys	Kildallan

=== Ulster semi-finals ===
28 October 2018 Semi-final	Robert Emmets	2-23 - 1-10	Seán Treacys	Owenbeg COE
	C McHugh (0-7, 0-5fs, 0-1 ’65); C McNeill (0-6, 0-5fs), P Bannon (0-5), RJ McQuillan (1-0), J Morgan (1-0), D Kilgore (0-2), M McCartin (0-1), E McQuillan (0-1), C Bannon (0-1).	Report	D Magee (1-7, 1-6fs), M Doran (0-1), P Lyness (0-1), P Scullion (0-1).

28 October 2018 Semi-final	Castleblayney	2-14 - 3-07	Clonduff	St. Oliver Plunkett Park
	F Rafter, 1-11 (0-9f, ’65, sc), B McGuigan 1-1, H Byrne 0-2.	Report	C Young 0-5 (4f, ’65), L McParland 1-0, P Grant 1-0, R Ward 1-0, R Branagan 0-2.

=== Ulster final ===
11 November 2018 Final	Castleblayney	1-14 - 0-16	Robert Emmets	Athletic Grounds
	F Rafter (0-11 0-9 frees, 0-1 ’65), M Treanor (1-2), F Finnegan (0-1).	Report	C McNeill (0-5 frees), C McHugh (0-3, 0-2 frees, 0-1 ’65); D McQuillan (0-2); J Morgan (0-2), D Kilgore (0-2), P Bannon (0-1), E Duffin (0-1).

== All-Ireland Junior Club Hurling Championship ==
=== All-Ireland quarter-final ===
25 November 2018 Quarter-final	John Mitchels	1-10 - 2-11	Castleblayney	Páirc na hÉireann
	D Nugent 0-4 (0-2f), N McKenna 0-3 (0-3f), E McCabe 1-0, N Kennedy 0-2 and G Lennon 0-1.	Report	F Rafter 1-8 (0-7f), P Finnegan 1-1, M Treanor 0-1, H Byrne (0-1’65).	Referee: R

=== All-Ireland semi-finals ===
20 January 2019 Semi-final	Carrick Hurling Club	0-10 - 1-08	Castleblayney	TEG Cusack Park
	C Cunniffe 0-8 (6f, 1 65); S Goldrick, J McNabola 0-1 each.	Report	H Byrne 1-4 (1-0 pen, 3f); P Treanor, F Rafter 0-2 each.	Referee: S Stack (Dublin)

20 January 2019 Semi-final	Dunnamaggin	0-23 - 2-16 (aet)	Cloughduv	Fraher Field
	T Maher (0-10, 0-4 frees, 0-1 65m), J Fitzpatrick (0-6), R Cody and R Coffey (0-2 each), M Cody, D Fitzpatrick and D O’Keeffe (0-1 each).	Report	M Walsh (1-4), B Verling (0-6, 0-4 frees), K Barry Murphy (1-1), M Verling (0-2), A Ahern, J Moynihan and J Ryan (0-1 each).	Referee: T Walsh (Waterford)

=== All-Ireland final ===
10 February 2019 Final	Castleblayney	1-13 - 1-17	Dunnamaggin	Croke Park
	F Rafter 0-9 (6fs, 165), B McGuigan 1-1, H Byrne 0-2, C McNally 0-1.	Report	T Maher 0-7 (4fs, 165), J Fitzpatrick 1-3, R Cody and R Coffey 0-2 each, D Fitzpatrick, D O’Keeffe, E Kearney (f) 0-1 each.	Referee: L Gordon (Galway)

== Championship statistics ==
=== Top scorers ===
Overall

Rank	Player	Club	Tally	Total	Matches	Average
1	Fergal Rafter	Castleblayney	3-48	57	6	9.50
2	Barry Slevin	Na Fianna	2-25	31	4	7.75
3	Ronan Coffey	Dunnamaggin	4-17	29	5	5.80
4	Thomas Maher	Dunnamaggin	0-27	27	5	5.60
5	John Fitzpatrick	Dunnamaggin	3-16	25	5	5.00
5	Clement Cunniffe	Carrick	1-22	25	3	8.33
7	Mark Slevin	Na Fianna	5-09	24	4	6.00
7	Anthony Hartnett	Tournafulla	0-24	24	2	12.00
9	Hugh Byrne	Castleblayney	3-11	20	6	3.33
10	Conor McHugh	Robert Emmets	0-19	19	3	6.33

In a single game

Rank	Player	Club	Tally	Total	Opposition
1	Fergal Rafter	Castleblayney	1-11	14	Clonduff
1	Anthony Hartnett	Tournafulla	0-14	14	Kilgarvan
3	Shane Fennell	Knocknridge	2-07	13	Maynooth
3	John Newman	Wolfe Tones	0-13	13	Avondale
5	Mark Slevin	Na Fianna	3-03	12	Crookedwood
6	Ronan Coffey	Dunnamaggin	2-05	11	Na Fianna
6	Fergal Rafter	Castleblayney	1-08	11	John Mitchels
6	Fergal Rafter	Castleblayney	0-11	11	Robert Emmets
9	Ronan Coffey	Dunnamaggin	1-07	10	St. Maur's
9	Fergal Rafter	Castleblayney	1-07	10	Burt
9	Danny Magee	Castleblayney	1-07	10	Burt
9	Eoghan Kearney	Dunnamaggin	0-10	10	Knockbridge
9	J. M. Sheridan	Erin's Own	0-10	10	Burt
9	Eoghan Kearney	Dunnamaggin	0-10	10	Cloughduv
9	Anthony Hartnett	Tournafulla	0-10	10	Ballinameela
9	Brian Verling	Cloughduv	0-10	10	Boherlahen-Dualla

=== Miscellaneous ===
- Castleblayney Hurling Club became the first club to win three Ulster Championship titles.
