= 2007–08 All-Ireland Intermediate Club Hurling Championship =

Championship Details
- Dates: 7 October 2007 – 9 February 2008
- Teams: 20

All Ireland Champions
- Winners: Clonkill (1st win)
- Captain: Paddy Dowdall
- Manager: Pat O'Toole

All Ireland Runners-up
- Runners-up: Tommy Larkin's
- Captain: Kevin Hooban
- Manager: Noel Murphy

Provincial Champions
- Munster: Clonlara
- Leinster: Clonkill
- Ulster: Keady Lámh Dhearg
- Connacht: Tommy Larkin's

The 2007–08 All-Ireland Intermediate Club Hurling Championship was the fourth staging of the All-Ireland Intermediate Club Hurling Championship since its establishment made by the Gaelic Athletic Association in 2004.

The All-Ireland final was played on 9 February 2008 at Croke Park in Dublin, between Clonkill from Westmeath and Tommy Larkin’s from Galway. Clonkill won the match by 4-15 to 3-14 to become the first Westmeath club to win an All-Ireland title.

== Connacht Intermediate Club Hurling Championship ==
=== Connacht final ===
2 December 2007 Semi-final	James Stephens	1-01 - 0-12	Tommy Larkin's	James Stephens Park
	J Duffy 1-0, T Duffy 0-1.		E Hayes 0-10, K Hoban 0-1, N Kelly 0-1.

== Leinster Intermediate Club Hurling Championship ==
=== Leinster quarter-finals ===
27 October 2007 Quarter-final	Clara	0-06 - 2-12	Clonkill	Clara Grounds
	C Phelan 0-4, M Shortall 0-1, TJ Fitzgerald 0-1.		B Murtagh 1-5, C Austin 1-0, E Loughlin 0-3, A Mitchell 0-2, A Dowling 0-1, P Dowling 0-1.

28 October 2007 Quarter-final	Ferns St Aidan's	4-14 - 3-08	Confey	Ferns Grounds
	J Breen 2-0, C O'Connor 1-2, E Cullen 1-1, A McFarland 0-3, T Dwyer 0-2, P Morris 0-2, B Bernie 0-2, P Farrell 0-1, E Walsh 0-1.		E Fitzpatrick 2-0, O Lynch 0-5, D Nolan 1-0, P Divilly 0-3.

=== Leinster semi-finals ===
4 November 2007 Semi-final	Ferns St Aidan's	1-19 - 1-12	Glenealy	Ferns Grounds

4 November 2007 Semi-final	Clonkill	2-13 - 1-05	Kiltale	Clonkill Grounds
			P Durnin 1-4, S White 0-1.

=== Leinster final ===
18 November 2007 Final	Clonkill	1-15 - 3-07	Ferns St Aidan's	Clonkill Grounds
	B Murtagh 0-8, D Ayres 1-0, P Dowdall 0-2, E Loughlin 0-2, L Folan 0-1, A Dowdall 0-1, C Austin 0-1.	Report	E Cullin 1-3, T O'Dwyer 1-2, C O'Connor 1-0, T Dwyer 0-1, P Morris 0-1.

== Munster Intermediate Club Hurling Championship ==
=== Munster quarter-final ===
4 November 2007 Quarter-final	Clonlara	3-11 - 2-11	Carrigtwohill	Cusack Park
	D Honan 2-1, D Conwary 1-0, D Madden 0-3, C O'Donovan 0-3, J Conlon 0-2, T Lynch 0-1, T O'Donovan 0-1.		N McCarthy 0-5, S O'Farrell 1-0, M Barry 1-0, S Dineen 0-2, F Flannery 0-2, B Lordan 0-1, R White 0-1.	Referee: N Cosgrove (Tipperary)

=== Munster semi-finals ===
Semi-final	Dromin-Athlacca	w/o - scr.	Passage

11 November 2007 Semi-final	Lorrha-Dorrha	2-13 - 3-18	Clonlara	MacDonagh Park
	K Maher 0-6, R O'Meara 1-1, N Hogan 1-1, C Duggan 0-4, J Maher 0-1.		D Madden 0-11, J Conlon 1-4, D Honan 2-0, C O'Donovan 0-2, T Lynch 0-1.	Referee: J O'Mahony (Limerick)

=== Munster final ===
25 November 2007 Final	Clonlara	1-14 - 1-08	Dromin-Athlacca	Cusack Park
	D Madden 0-7, J Conlon 1-3, C O'Donovan 0-2, D Honan 0-1, T O'Donovan 0-1.		E O'Leary 1-1, P Neenan 0-4, J Kelleher 0-1, P Storan 0-1, T Ryan 0-1.

== Ulster Intermediate Club Hurling Championship ==
=== Ulster quarter-finals ===
7 October 2026 Quarter-final	Éire Óg Carrickmore	4-05 - 1-08	Castleblayney	Healy Park
	F Mahill 1-1, Justin Kelly 1-1, SP Begley 1-1, Joseph Kelly 1-0, P McMahon 0-2.		S Lambe 0-6, M McHugh 1-0, C Connoly 0-1, B Reilly 0-1.

7 October 2026 Quarter-final	Liatroim Fontenoys	0-14 - 1-07	Eoghan Rua	Páirc Esler

=== Ulster semi-finals ===
14 October 2007 Semi-final	Robert Emmets Cushendun	1-13 - 3-10	Liatroim Fontenoys	Casement Park
	D McQuillan 0-6, E O'Hara 1-0, A O'Connell 0-1, A Mort 0-1, RP Laverty 0-1, Paddy McSparron 0-1, M Hamilton 0-1, Paul McSparron 0-1, R McQuillan 0-1.		D Morgan 2-0, P McAleenan 1-2, L Morgan 0-5, A Brown 0-2, J Brown 0-1.

14 October 2007 Semi-final	Keady Lámh Dhearg	0-12 - 0-09	Éire Óg Carrickmore	Watty Graham Park
	P McCormack 0-7, R Mullan 0-1, G Enright 0-1, P Harvey 0-1, L McKee 0-1, DP O'Neill 0-1.		Justin Kelly 0-7, SP Begley 0-1, F Magill 0-1.

=== Final ===
28 October 2007 Final	Keady Lámh Dhearg	1-15 - 0-06	Liatroim Fontenoys	Casement Park
	P Breen 1-3, G Enright 0-3, P McCormack 0-3, L McKee 0-2, K McGreevey 0-1, F Fullerton 0-1, P Kirk 0-1, E McDonnell 0-1.		J Brown 0-2, D Burns 0-1, P McAleenan 0-1, J McCrickard 0-1, L Morgan 0-1.

== All-Ireland Intermediate Club Hurling Championship ==
=== All-Ireland quarter-final ===
19 January 2008 Quarter-final	Robert Emmetts	0-04 – 0-14	Tommy Larkin’s	Emerald GAA Grounds
	K McMullan 0-4.		E Hayes 0-6, K Hooban 0-2, P Moroney 0-2, M Fahy 0-1, P Flynn 0-1, A Garvey 0-1, Declan Garvey 0-1.

=== All-Ireland semi-finals ===
27 January 2008 Semi-final	Tommy Larkin’s	1-11 – 0-11	Clonlara	MacDonagh Park
	M Fahy 1-1, E Hayes 0-4, K Hoban 0-2, A Garvey 0-2, D Garvey 0-2.		J Conlon 0-5, C O'Donovan 0-2, N O'Connell 0-1, T O'Donovan 0-1, D Honan 0-1, T Lynch 0-1.

27 January 2008 Semi-final	Clonkill	1-10 – 1-04	Keady Lámh Dhearg	Pearse Park
	B Murtagh 0-4, S Owens 1-0, L Folan 0-2, A Mitchell 0-2, E Loughlin 0-2.		P McCormack 1-2, B McCormack 0-1, L McKee 0-1.

=== All-Ireland final ===
9 February 2008 Final	Clonkill	4-15 – 3-14	Tommy Larkin’s	Croke Park
	B Murtagh 1-6, L Donoghue 2-0, D Ayres 1-1, A Mitchell 0-2, A Dowdall 0-2, C Reilly 0-1, P Dowdall 0-1, E Loughlin 0-1, L Folan 0-1.		E Hayes 1-8, D Garvey 1-0, B Shiel 1-0, P Moroney 0-2, D Kelly 0-1, A Garvey 0-1, K Hooban 0-1, N Kelly 0-1.

== Championship statistics ==
=== Miscellaneous ===
- Clonkill became the first club from Westmeath to win an All-Ireland title in any grade of hurling.
