= Ballymartle GAA =

Gaelic games club in County Cork, Ireland

Ballymartle
- Baile an Mhairteálaigh
- Founded: 1897
- County: Cork
- Colours
- Grounds: Ballymartle GAA Grounds

Playing kits
Standard colours

Ballymartle GAA Club is a Gaelic Athletic Association club in Riverstick, County Cork, Ireland. The club is affiliated to the Carrigdhoun Board and fields teams in both hurling and Gaelic football.

== History ==
Located in the village of Riverstick, halfway between Cork and Kinsale, Ballymartle GAA Club was established in 1897. The club spent its early years associated with the Carbery Division, however, a move was made to the Carrigdhoun Division in 1925. Just over a decade later, Ballymartle claimed their first South East JAHC title. It was the first of six such titles between 1936 and 1958, while Cork JHC titles were also won in 1952 and 1958.

After a brief period in the Cork IHC, Ballymartle once again returned to the divisional ranks. The club won a further five South East JAHC titles between 1972 and 1986, before converting the last of those into a third Cork JAHC title after a 3–08 to 2–04 win over Meelin in the final.

The first decades of the new century brought further successes for Ballymartle. The club's junior team brought their South East JAHC title tally to 16 and second only to Ballinhassig on the all-time roll of honour. After 20 years in the grade, Ballymartle claimed the Cork IHC title in 2006 after a 1–23 to 1–19 win over Carrigaline. Four years later, the club secured senior status for the first time in their history after winning the Cork PIHC title. This was subsequently converted into a Munster Club IHC title, before a 3–15 to 1–20 win over Dicksboro in the 2011 All-Ireland Club IHC final.

== Honours ==
- All-Ireland Intermediate Club Hurling Championship (1): 2011
- Munster Intermediate Club Hurling Championship (1) 2010
- Cork Premier Intermediate Hurling Championship (1): 2010
- Cork Intermediate Hurling Championship (1): 2006
- Cork Junior A Hurling Championship (3): 1952, 1958, 1986
- Cork Senior Hurling League Division 3 (1): 2024
- Cork Intermediate Hurling League (2): 1995, 2010, 2009
- South East Junior A Hurling Championship (16): 1936, 1939, 1940, 1943, 1951, 1952, 1958, 1972, 1975, 1976, 1985, 1986, 2008, 2010, 2015, 2021
- South East Junior A Football Championship (1): 2018
- South East Junior B Hurling Championship (7): 2010, 2011, 2012, 2013, 2014, 2015, 2019
- South-East Under 21 A Hurling Championship (7): 1967, 1981, 1989, 1992, 2008, 2010, 2012
- South-East Under 21 A Football Championship (1): 2009
- South-East Under 21 B Football Championship (4): 2012, 2022, 2023, 2025

== Notable player ==
- Bobby O'Regan: All-Ireland SHC–winner (1942)
