= Keady Michael Dwyer's GFC =

Armagh-based Gaelic games club

Keady Michael Dwyer's GFC.
- Founded: 1887
- County: Armagh
- Colours: Green and white
- Grounds: Garard McGleenan Park (Páirc Ghearóid Mhic Giolla Fhinnéin)

Playing kits
Standard colours

Keady Michael Dwyer's Gaelic Football Club is a Gaelic Athletic Association club from Keady, County Armagh, Northern Ireland. It is affiliated to Armagh GAA and plays Gaelic football in the Armagh Intermediate Championship. A sister club, Keady Lámh Dhearg, established in 1949, now provides for hurling. The club's ground is Gerard McGleenan Park (Irish: Páirc Ghearóid Mhic Giolla Fhinnéin).

== History ==
The club was one of the first in Armagh, founded in 1888, a year before the creation of the GAA's Armagh County Board.

== Notable players ==
- Seamus Mallon
- John Toal, Armagh player 2001-05, All-Ireland winner 2002

== Honours ==
=== Football ===
- Armagh Senior Football Championship (4)
  - 1938, 1953, 1956, 1984
- Armagh Intermediate Football Championship (2)
  - 1983, 1995
- Armagh Junior Football Championship (5)
  - 1925, 1927, 1933, 1976, 2014, 2018
- Armagh Minor Football Championship (2)
  - 1947 (Inaugural), 1957

== Hurling ==
In the 1930s the Dwyers enjoyed a run of success in the county Hurling Championship.

=== Honours ===
- Armagh Senior Hurling Championship (3)
  - 1935, 1936, 1937
