= St Brigid's GAC Cloughmills =

St Brigid's, Cloughmills
- Naomh Bríd, Cloch an Mhuilinn
- Founded: 1992
- County: Antrim
- Nickname: The Biddies
- Colours: Orange and black
- Grounds: Fr Leonard Park

Playing kits
Standard colours

St Brigid's, Cloughmills is a Gaelic Athletic Association club located in Cloughmills, County Antrim, Northern Ireland. The club is primarily concerned with the game of hurling. The club added a Ladies' Gaelic Football unit which entered the Antrim leagues for the first time in 2024. In 2026, the club entered a Men's Gaelic Football team into the Antrim leagues for the very first time.

== History ==
Located in the village of Cloughmills, in north County Antrim, St Brigid's GAC Cloughmills was founded in 1992. The club has spent most of its existence operating in the junior grade, winning the Antrim JAHC title for the first time in 1997 and for the second time in 2010. Two years later, St Brigid's secured senior status for the first time after claiming the Antrim IHC title. A second Antrim IHC was won in 2016, before St Brigid's beat Eoghan Rua to claim the Ulster Club IHC title. Further to this, in 2023, St Brigid's beat rivals Glen Rovers, Armoy to win a third Antrim JHC.

== Honours ==
- Ulster Intermediate Club Hurling Championship: 2016
- Antrim Intermediate Hurling Championship (2): 2012, 2016
- Antrim Junior Hurling Championship (3): 1997, 2010, 2023
- Antrim U16 LGFA C Championship: 2025

County Representatives:

Liam Kearns - 2012 (Antrim Seniors), 2008 (Antrim U21s) & 2005 (Antrim Minors)

Aaron Smiley - 2010 (Antrim Seniors), 2008 (Antrim U21s) & 2005 (Antrim Minors)

Michael Devlin - 2010 (Antrim Seniors & U21s), 2011-2012 (Antrim U21s) & 2007-2009 (Antrim Minors)

Conor Laverty - 2012 & 2018 (Antrim Seniors), 2010-2012 (Antrim U21s) & 2009 (Antrim Minors)

Stephen Smyth - 2012 (Antrim U21s) & 2009 (Antrim Minors)

Joe Smyth - 2012 (Antrim U21s) & 2010 (Antrim Minors)

Ruairi Laverty - 2015 (Antrim U21s) & 2012 (Antrim Minors)

Geoffrey Og Laverty - 2016 (Antrim Minors)

James Doherty - 2008 (Antrim Minors)

Chris McKiernan - 2023 - 2025 (Fermanagh Seniors)

Sean McKendry - 2023 & 2024 (Fermanagh Seniors)
