= Munster Intermediate Club Hurling Championship =

Irish provincial hurling championship

Munster GAA Hurling Intermediate Club Championship
- Current season or competition: 2026 Munster Intermediate Club Hurling Championship
- Irish: Craobh Iomána Idirmheánach Mumhan na gClub
- Code: Hurling
- Founded: 2003; 23 years ago
- Region: Munster (GAA)
- Trophy: Hoare Cup
- No. of teams: 6
- Title holders: Upperchurch Drombane (1st title)
- Most titles: No club has won more than once
- Sponsors: Allied Irish Banks

The Munster Intermediate Club Hurling Championship (known for sponsorship reasons as the AIB Munster GAA Hurling Intermediate Club Championship; abbreviated as the Munster Club IHC) is an annual hurling competition organised by the Munster Council of the Gaelic Athletic Association and contested by the champion intermediate clubs in the province of Munster in Ireland. It is the second-most prestigious competition for Munster hurling clubs .

The Munster Intermediate Club Championship was introduced in 2003. In its current format, the championship begins in late October or early November and is usually played over a four-week period. The six participating club teams compete in a straight knockout competition that culminates with the Munster final for the two remaining teams. The winner of the Munster Intermediate Championship, as well as being presented with the Hoare Cup, qualifies for the subsequent All-Ireland Club Championship.

The competition has been won by 22 teams, however, no team has ever won the championship on more than one occasion. Cork clubs have accumulated the highest number of victories with 10 wins. Kilmoyley's win in the 2021 championship was the first for a Kerry club meaning clubs from all six counties have won at least one title.

Upperchurch Drombane from Tipperary are the reigning champions.

== Format ==
=== Overview ===
The Munster Championship is a single elimination tournament. Each team is afforded only one defeat before being eliminated from the championship. Pairings for matches are drawn at random and there is no seeding.

Each match is played as a single leg. If a match is drawn there is a period of extra time, however, if both sides are still level at the end of extra time a replay takes place and so on until a winner is found.

=== Competition format ===
Quarter-final: Four teams contest this round. The two winning teams advance directly to the semi-final stage. The two losing teams are eliminated from the championship.

Semi-finals: Four teams contest this round. The two winning teams advance directly to the final. The two losing teams are eliminated from the championship.

Final: The final is contested by the two semi-final winners.

== Teams ==
=== Qualification ===
| County | Championship |
|---|---|
| Clare | Clare Intermediate Hurling Championship |
| Cork | Cork Premier Intermediate Hurling Championship |
| Kerry | Kerry Senior Hurling Championship |
| Limerick | Limerick Premier Intermediate Hurling Championship |
| Tipperary | Tipperary Premier Intermediate Hurling Championship |
| Waterford | Waterford Premier Intermediate Hurling Championship |

=== 2024 teams ===
70 clubs will compete in the 2024 Munster Intermediate Club Hurling Championship: sixteen teams from Clare, twelve teams from Cork, ten teams from Kerry, eight teams from Limerick, sixteen teams from Tipperary and eight teams from Waterford.

| County | No. | Clubs competing in county championship |
|---|---|---|
| Clare | 16 | Bodyke, Broadford, Clarecastle, Inagh-Kilnamona, Killanena, Newmarket-on-Fergus, Ogonnelloe, Parteen-Meelick, Ruan, Sixmilebridge, Smith O'Brien's, St. Joseph's Doora-Barefield, Tubber, Tulla, Whitegate, **Wolfe Tones na Sionna** |
| Cork | 12 | Aghabullogue, Ballincollig, Ballinhassig, Ballymartle, Carrigaline, Castlemartyr, Dungourney, Éire Óg, Kilworth, Mallow, Valley Rovers, **Watergrasshill** |
| Kerry | 10 | **Abbeydorney**, Ballyduff, Ballyheigue, Causeway, Crotta O'Neill's, Dr Crokes, Kilmoyley, Lixnaw, St Brendan's, Tralee Parnells |
| Limerick | 8 | Blackrock, Bruff, Effin, Garryspillane, Glenroe, Granagh-Ballingarry, Na Piarsaigh, **Newcastle West** |
| Tipperary | 16 | |
| Waterford | 8 | Ballygunner, Ballysaggart, **Brickey Rangers**, Cappoquin, Clashmore–Kinsalebeg, Dunhill, Shamrocks, Tramore |

Note: Bold indicates county representatives.

== List of Finals ==
| Year | Winners | | | Runners-up | | | Venue | Winning captain(s) | # |
| Year | County | Club | Score | County | Club | Score | Venue | Winning captain(s) | # |
|---|---|---|---|---|---|---|---|---|---|
| 2025 | TIP | Upperchurch–Drombane | 3-20 | CLA | O'Callaghan's Mills | 0-15 | TUS Gaelic Grounds | | |
| 2024 | COR | Watergrasshill | 1-21 | TIP | Cashel | 0-14 | TUS Gaelic Grounds | | |
| 2023 | COR | Castlelyons | 3-16 | CLA | Corofin | 0-19 | TUS Gaelic Grounds | | |
| 2022 | LIM | Monaleen | 1-22 | TIP | Roscrea | 0-18 | Pairc Ui Rinn | | |
| 2021 | KER | Kilmoyley | 0-24 | COR | Courcey Rovers | 0-21 | Gaelic Grounds | Florence McCarthy | |
| 2020 | | No championship | | | | | | | |
| 2019 | COR | Fr. O'Neill's | 2-15 | WAT | Ballysaggart | 0-17 | Fraher Field | Mark O'Keeffe; Dan Harrington | |
| 2018 | COR | Charleville | 2-20 | CLA | Feakle | 1-20 | Gaelic Grounds | Daniel O'Flynn | |
| 2017 | COR | Kanturk | 1-23 | CLA | Kilmaley | 0-25 | Gaelic Grounds | Lorcan O'Neill | |
| 2016 | WAT | Lismore | 2-14 | KER | Kilmoyley | 0-13 | Mallow GAA Complex | Paudie Prendergast | |
| 2015 | CLA | Wolfe Tones, Shannon | 1-18 | COR | Newcestown | 2-13 | Mallow GAA Complex | Aaron Cunningham | |
| 2014 | WAT | Cappoquin | 1-11 | LIM | Bruff | 0-13 | Mallow GAA Complex | Shane O'Rourke | |
| 2013 | COR | Youghal | 2-13 | TIP | Ballina | 2-10 | Mallow GAA Complex | Bill Cooper | |
| 2012 | TIP | Silvermines | 0-14 | KER | Ballyduff | 0-08 | Semple Stadium | Cathal Gleeson | |
| 2011 | LIM | Effin | 0-14 | KER | Ballyduff | 0-11 | Gaelic Park | John P. O'Donnell | |
| 2010 | COR | Ballymartle | 2-14 | TIP | Borrisokane | 0-08 | Gaelic Grounds | Patrick O'Dwyer | |
| 2009 | LIM | South Liberties | 2-10 | COR | Douglas | 1-12 | Mallow GAA Complex | Shane O'Neill | |
| 2008 | COR | Blarney | 2-07 | CLA | Broadford | 0-03 | Bruff Sportsfield | Danny Cronin | |
| 2007 | CLA | Clonlara | 1-14 | LIM | Dromin-Athlacca | 1-08 | Cusack Park | Paul Collins | |
| 2006 | CLA | Clooney-Quin | 0-14 | COR | Bishopstown | 1-08 | Gaelic Grounds | Pat Markham | |
| 2005 | COR | Ballinhassig | 1-12 | WAT | Ballyduff Upper | 0-13 | Páirc Mac Gearailt | Martin Coleman, Jnr | |
| 2004 | TIP | Kildangan | 1-10 | LIM | Dromin-Athlacca | 1-04 | Gaelic Grounds | Ger Slattery | |
| 2003 | COR | Bride Rovers | 0-14 | TIP | Kilruane MacDonagh's | 0-11 | FitzGerald Park, Kilmallock | Seán Ryan | |

== Roll of Honour ==
=== Performances by county ===
| County | Titles | Runners-up | Total |
|---|---|---|---|
| Cork | 10 | 4 | 14 |
| Clare | 3 | 4 | 7 |
| Limerick | 3 | 3 | 6 |
| Tipperary | 2 | 4 | 6 |
| Waterford | 2 | 2 | 4 |
| Kerry | 1 | 3 | 4 |

=== Winning years per county ===
| # | Team | Wins | Runners-up | Winning years | Years Runners-Up |
|---|---|---|---|---|---|
| 1 | Cork | 10 | 4 | 2003, 2005, 2008, 2010, 2013, 2017, 2018, 2019, 2023, 2024 | 2006, 2009, 2015, 2021 |
| 2 | Clare | 3 | 4 | 2006, 2007, 2015 | 2008, 2017, 2018, 2023 |
| 2 | Limerick | 3 | 3 | 2009, 2011, 2022 | 2004, 2007, 2014 |
| 4 | Tipperary | 2 | 4 | 2004, 2012 | 2003, 2010, 2013, 2022 |
| 4 | Waterford | 2 | 2 | 2014, 2016 | 2005, 2019 |
| 6 | Kerry | 1 | 3 | 2021 | 2011, 2012, 2016 |

== Records and statistics ==
=== Teams ===
==== County representatives ====
| Year | Clare | Cork | Kerry | Limerick | Tipperary | Waterford |
|---|---|---|---|---|---|---|
| 2003 | Broadford | Bride Rovers | Kilmoyley | Tournafulla | Kilruane MacDonaghs | Abbeyside |
| 2004 | Smith O'Brien's, Killaloe | St Catherine's | N/A | Dromin/Athlacca | Kildangan | Portlaw |
| 2005 | Inagh | Ballinhassig | N/A | Granagh-Ballingarry | Burgess | Ballyduff Upper |
| 2006 | Clooney-Quin | Bishopstown | N/A | Claughaun | Éire Óg, Annacarty | Clonea |
| 2007 | Clonlara | Carrigtwohill | N/A | Dromin/Athlacca | Lorrha | N/A |
| 2008 | Broadford | Blarney | Kilmoyley | Bruff | Templederry Kenyons | N/A |
| 2009 | Whitegate | Douglas | Kilmoyley | South Liberties | Carrick Davins | Dungarvan |
| 2010 | Killanena | Ballymartle | Ballyduff | Hospital-Herbertstown | Borrisokane | Roanmore |
| 2011 | Éire Óg, Ennis | Courcey Rovers | Ballyduff | Effin | Aherlow | Dunhill |
| 2012 | Ruan | Ballinhassig | Ballyduff | Ballybrown | Silvermines | An Rinn |
| 2013 | Whitegate | Youghal | St Brendan's, Ardfert | Dromin/Athlacca | Ballina | Ardmore |
| 2014 | Feakle | Ballyhea | Lixnaw | Bruff | N/A | Cappoquin |
| 2015 | Wolfe Tones, Shannon | Newcestown | Kilmoyley | Bruree | Clonakenny | Portlaw |
| 2016 | St. Joseph's, Doora-Barefield | Bandon | Kilmoyley | Monaleen | Newport | Lismore |
| 2017 | Kilmaley | Kanturk | Ballyduff | Murroe-Boher | St. Mary's | An Rinn |
| 2018 | Feakle | Charleville | Lixnaw | Garryspillane | Cashel King Cormacs | Clonea |
| 2019 | Broadford | Fr. O'Neill's | Causeway | Blackrock | Seán Treacy's | Ballysaggart |
| 2020 | No Championship | | | | | |
| 2021 | Smith O'Briens, Killaloe | Courcey Rovers | Kilmoyley | Mungret St Paul's | Moyne-Templetuohy | Dunhill |
| 2022 | St. Joseph's Doora-Barefield | Inniscarra | Causeway | Monaleen | Roscrea | Ballysaggart |
| 2023 | Corofin | Castlelyons | Crotta O'Neill's | Dromin/Athlacca | Lorrha-Dorrha | Ferrybank |
| 2024 | Wolfe Tones na Sionna | Watergrasshill | Abbeydorney | Newcastle West | Cashel King Cormacs | Brickey Rangers |
| 2025 | O'Callaghan's Mills | Ballinhassig | Abbeydorney | Garryspillane | Upperchurch–Drombane | Tallow |
| 2026 | Clarecastle | Ballincollig | Abbeydorney | Dromin/Athlacca | St Mary's | Clashmore–Kinsalebeg |

=== Top scorers ===
==== All time ====
As of match played 29 November 2025

| Rank | Top scorer | Team | Score | Total |
|---|---|---|---|---|
| 1 | Daniel Collins | Kilmoyley | 1-49 | 52 |
| 2 | Maurice Shanahan | Lismore | 4-27 | 39 |
| 3 | Declan Dalton | Fr. O'Neill's | 3-28 | 37 |
| 4 | Brian Gaynor | Kilruane MacDonaghs | 6-17 | 35 |
| 4 | Stephen Bennett | Ballysaggart | 0-35 | 35 |
| 6 | Brendan Hannon | Ballyduff Upper | 2-25 | 31 |
| 6 | Luke Cashin | Roscrea | 2-25 | 31 |
| 6 | Michael O'Leary | Abbeydorney | 1-28 | 31 |
| 9 | Alan O'Connor | Ballybrown | 1-25 | 28 |
| 9 | Bobby O'Sullivan | Ballyduff | 1-25 | 28 |

==== By year ====
| Year | Top scorer | Team | Score | Total |
|---|---|---|---|---|
| 2003 | Brian Gaynor | Bride Rovers | 6-17 | 35 |
| 2004 | Darragh Egan | Kildangan | 1-21 | 24 |
| 2005 | Brendan Hannon | Ballyduff Upper | 2-25 | 31 |
| 2006 | Brian Shally | Clooney-Quin | 0-23 | 23 |
| 2007 | Donal Madden | Clonlara | 0-21 | 21 |
| 2008 | Pádraig Hickey | Broadford | 3-07 | 16 |
| 2009 | Mark Harrington | Douglas | 2-14 | 20 |
| 2010 | Colm Larkin | Borrisokane | 0-14 | 14 |
| 2011 | Tommy Quaid | Effin | 1-19 | 22 |
| 2012 | Alan O'Connor | Ballybrown | 1-25 | 28 |
| 2013 | Michael Breen | Ballina | 2-16 | 22 |
| 2014 | Shane O'Rourke | Cappoquin | 0-16 | 16 |
| 2015 | Aron Shanagher | Wolfe Tones, Shannon | 1-18 | 21 |
| 2016 | Maurice Shanahan | Lismore | 4-27 | 39 |
| 2017 | Liam O'Keeffe | Kanturk | 1-17 | 20 |
| 2018 | Shane McGrath | Feakle | 1-18 | 21 |
| 2018 | Shane Conway | Lixnaw | 0-21 | 21 |
| 2019 | Declan Dalton | Fr O'Neill's | 3-28 | 37 |
| 2021 | Daniel Collins | Kilmoyley | 0-25 | 25 |
| 2022 | Luke Cashin | Roscrea | 2-25 | 31 |
| 2023 | Gearóid Kelly | Corofin | 0-24 | 24 |
| 2024 | Adam Murphy | Watergrasshill | 1-24 | 27 |
| 2025 | Hugh Flanagan | Garryspillane | 3-11 | 20 |

==== Single game ====
| Year | Top scorer | Team | Opposition | Score | Total |
|---|---|---|---|---|---|
| 2003 | Brian Gaynor | Kilruane MacDonaghs | Kilmoyley | 3-06 | 15 |
| 2003 | Brian Gaynor | Kilruane MacDonaghs | Tournafulla | 3-06 | 15 |
| 2004 | Darragh Egan | Kildangan | Smith O'Brien's, Killaloe | 1-07 | 10 |
| 2005 | Brendan Hannon | Ballyduff Upper | Burgess | 2-06 | 12 |
| 2006 | Brian Shally | Clooney-Quin | Éire Óg, Annacarty | 0-09 | 9 |
| 2007 | Donal Madden | Clonlara | Lorrha-Dorrha | 0-11 | 11 |
| 2008 | Pádraig Hickey | Broadford | Bruff | 2-03 | 9 |
| 2008 | P. O'Leary | Templederry Kenyons | Broadford | 1-06 | 9 |
| 2009 | Mark Harrington | Douglas | Dungarvan | 2-08 | 14 |
| 2010 | Mark Flaherty | Killanena | Ballyduff | 2-06 | 12 |
| 2011 | Cathal Dillon | Aherlow | Effin | 1-09 | 12 |
| 2012 | Bobby O'Sullivan | Ballyduff | Ballybrown | 1-09 | 12 |
| 2012 | Alan O'Connor | Ballybrown | Ballinhassig | 0-12 | 12 |
| 2013 | Michael Breen | Ballina | St. Brendan's, Ardfert | 2-07 | 13 |
| 2014 | Shane O'Rourke | Cappoquin | Feakle | 0-11 | 11 |
| 2015 | Aron Shanagher | Wolfe Tones, Shannon | Newcestown | 0-09 | 9 |
| 2016 | Maurice Shanahan | Lismore | Bandon | 2-10 | 16 |
| 2017 | Seán Tobin | Murroe-Boher | Kilmaley | 0-12 | 12 |
| 2018 | Shane Conway | Lixnaw | Cashel King Cormacs | 0-13 | 13 |
| 2019 | Declan Dalton | Fr. O'Neill's | Broadford | 1-12 | 15 |
| 2021 | Daniel Collins | Kilmoyley | Courcey Rovers | 0-10 | 10 |
| 2022 | Mark O'Dwyer | Monaleen | Roscrea | 0-15 | 15 |
| 2023 | Alan Fenton | Castlelyons | Crotta O'Neill's | 1-11 | 14 |
| 2024 | Adam Murphy | Watergrasshill | Cashel King Cormacs | 1-12 | 15 |
| 2025 | Hugh Flanagan | Garryspillane | Tallow | 3-11 | 20 |

==== Finals ====
| Final | Top scorer | Team | Score | Total |
|---|---|---|---|---|
| 2003 | Brian Gaynor | Kilruane MacDonaghs | 0-05 | 5 |
| 2003 | Jerome O'Driscoll | Bride Rovers | 0-05 | 5 |
| 2004 | Darragh Egan | Kildangan | 0-05 | 5 |
| 2005 | Brendan Hannon | Ballyduff Upper | 0-08 | 8 |
| 2006 | Brian Shally | Clooney-Quin | 0-08 | 8 |
| 2007 | Donal Madden | Clonlara | 0-07 | 7 |
| 2008 | Mark Cremin | Blarney | 1-03 | 6 |
| 2009 | Brian Slattery | South Liberties | 1-03 | 6 |
| 2010 | Dan Dwyer | Ballymartle | 2-01 | 7 |
| 2011 | Tommy Quaid | Effin | 0-04 | 4 |
| 2012 | Jason Forde | Silvermines | 0-07 | 7 |
| 2013 | Brendan Ring | Youghal | 0-07 | 7 |
| 2014 | Shane Bulfin | Bruff | 0-06 | 6 |
| 2015 | Aron Shanagher | Wolfe Tones, Shannon | 0-09 | 9 |
| 2016 | Daniel Collins | Kilmoyley | 0-13 | 13 |
| 2017 | Liam O'Keeffe | Kanturk | 1-07 | 10 |
| 2018 | Darragh Fitzgibbon | Charleville | 0-09 | 9 |
| 2018 | Shane McGrath | Feakle | 0-09 | 9 |
| 2019 | Declan Dalton | Fr. O'Neill's | 1-07 | 10 |
| 2021 | Daniel Collins | Kilmoyley | 0-10 | 10 |
| 2022 | Mark O'Dwyer | Monaleen | 0-15 | 15 |
| 2023 | Gearóid Kelly | Corofin | 0-12 | 12 |
| 2024 | Adam Murphy | Watergrasshill | 1-12 | 15 |
| 2025 | Conor Fahey | Upperchurch–Drombane | 1-02 | 5 |
| 2025 | Luke Shanahan | Upperchurch–Drombane | 0-05 | 5 |
| 2025 | Seán Boyce | O'Callaghan's Mills | 0-05 | 5 |

== See also ==
- Munster Senior Club Hurling Championship
- Munster Junior Club Hurling Championship
