= Aron Shanagher =

Irish hurler

Personal information
- Native name: Aron Ó Seanachair (Irish)
- Born: 16 May 1997 (age 29) Shannon, County Clare, Ireland
- Occupation: Student

Sport
- Sport: Hurling
- Position: Left corner-forward
Club
- Years: Club
- Wolfe Tones
Club titles
- Clare titles: 0
Inter-county*
Years	County	Apps (scores)
2016-present	Clare	16 (6-08)
Inter-county titles
- Munster titles: 0
- All-Irelands: 1
- NHL: 2
- All Stars: 0
- *Inter County team apps and scores correct as of 22:24, 2 July 2021.

Aron Shanagher (born 1997) is an Irish hurler who plays as a left corner-forward for the Clare senior team.

== Career ==
Born in Shannon, County Clare, Shanagher was introduced to hurling in his youth. He developed his skills at St. Caimin's Community School while simultaneously enjoying championship successes at underage levels with the Wolfe Tones club. Shanagher subsequently became a regular member of the Wolfe Tones senior team and has won one Munster medal and one championship medal in the intermediate grade.

Shanagher made his début on the inter-county scene at the age of sixteen when he first linked up with the Clare minor team. He enjoyed little success in this grade before later joining the under-21 side. Shanagher made his senior debut during the 2016 league. Since then he has won one National Hurling League medal.

== Career statistics ==
As of match played 27 June 2021.

Team	Year	National League			Munster		All-Ireland		Total	
Team	Year	Division	Apps	Score	Apps	Score	Apps	Score	Apps	Score
Clare	2016	Division 1B	5	2-00	1	0-00	3	3-02	9	5-02
Clare	2017	Division 1A	6	2-09	2	0-01	0	0-00	8	2-10
Clare	2018	Division 1A	0	0-00	0	0-00	2	1-01	2	1-01
Clare	2019	Division 1A	3	0-00	4	0-00	0	0-00	7	0-00
Clare	2020	Division 1B	4	0-04	1	0-00	2	2-04	7	2-08
Clare	2021	Division 1B	5	1-05	1	0-00	0	0-00	6	1-05
Total			23	5-18	9	0-01	7	6-07	39	11-26

== Honours ==
Wolfe Tones

- Munster Intermediate Club Hurling Championship (1) : 2015
- Clare Intermediate Hurling Championship (1) : 2015

Clare

- All-Ireland Senior Hurling Championship (1): 2024
- National Hurling League (2): 2016, 2024
