= Antrim Junior Hurling Championship =

Junior grade hurling championship in Antrim

- Irish: Craobh Iomána Shóisearach Aontroma
- Code: Hurling
- Region: Antrim (GAA)
- Trophy: Kevin Grieve Cup
- No. of teams: 11
- Title holders: Patrick Sarsfields (1st title)
- Sponsors: Casement Social Club
- Official website: Official website

The Antrim Junior Hurling Championship (known for sponsorship reasons as the Casement Social Club Junior Hurling Championship and abbreviated to the Antrim JHC) is an annual hurling competition organised by the Antrim County Board of the Gaelic Athletic Association and contested by the junior-graded clubs in the county of Antrim in Northern Ireland. It is the third tier overall in the entire Antrim hurling championship system.

Patrick Sarsfields are the title holders after defeating Lámh Dhearg by 4–14 to 2–12 in the 2026 final.

== Format ==
In 2026 Junior A and the former Junior B Championships were combined to a single Junior Championship with 11 teams. "Antrim Club Championship Group Stage fixtures" (PDF). Antrim GAA.

=== Group stage ===
The 11 teams are divided into three groups of four or three. Over the course of the group stage, each team plays once against the others in the group, resulting in each team being guaranteed at least two games. Two points are awarded for a win, one for a draw and zero for a loss. The teams are ranked in the group stage table by points gained, then scoring difference and then their head-to-head record.

=== Knockout stage ===
The knockout stage has not been published yet. It is expected that there will be at least a semi-final and final stage.

Semi-finals: The two winners from these games advance to the final.

Final: The two semi-final winners contest the final. The winning team are declared champions.

=== Promotion ===
At the end of the championship, the winning team is automatically promoted to the Antrim Intermediate Championship for the following season.

== Teams ==
=== 2026 teams ===
The 11 teams competing in the 2026 Antrim Junior A Hurling Championship are:

Club	Location	Colours	In championship since	Championship titles	Last championship title
All Saints	Ballymena	Black and white	2020	0	—
Ardoyne Kickhams	Ardoyne	Black and white	2024	5	1988
Belfast Saints	Belfast		2026	0	—
Glen Rovers	Armoy	Blue and white	2022	1	2007
Gort na Móna	Turf Lodge	Maroon, blue and yellow	2023	2	2019
Lámh Dhearg	Springfield Road	Red and white	2019	1	2016
Latharna Óg	Larne	Yellow and Blue	2026	0	—
Loch Mór Dál gCais		Green and Maroon	2026	0	—
Michael Davitts	Belfast	Green, white and gold	2024	0	—
Patrick Sarsfields	Belfast	Green and Black	2026	1	2026
St Brigid's Belfast	Belfast	Blue and Yellow	2025	0	—

== Sponsorship ==
Casement Social Club have been the title sponsor of the Antrim Junior Hurling Championship since 2019.

== Qualification for subsequent competitions ==
The Antrim Junior Championship winners qualify for the subsequent Ulster Junior Club Hurling Championship.

== Trophy and medals ==
The Kevin Grieve Cup is the current prize for winning the championship. In accordance with GAA rules, the County Board awards a set of gold medals to the championship winners.

== Roll of honour ==
=== By club ===
#	Club	Titles	Runners-up	Championships won	Championships runner-up
1	St Mary's Rasharkin	3	3	2009, 2015, 2024	2014, 2020, 2022
1	Con Magees	7	1	1975, 1981, 1993, 1994, 2014, 2021, 2025	2011
3	St. Teresa's	2	1	2005, 2008	2015
3	Creggan Kickhams	2	0	2011, 2013	—
3	Gort na Móna	2	0	2017, 2019	—
3	St Brigid's Cloughmills	2	0	2010, 2023	—
7	Robert Emmets	1	5	2018	2009, 2010, 2012, 2013, 2016
7	Shane O'Neill's	1	3	2022	2017, 2018, 2021
7	Glen Rovers	1	3	2007	2023, 2024, 2025
7	St. Paul's	1	1	2020	2019
7	Lámh Dhearg	1	1	2016	2026
7	Ardoyne Kickhams	1	0	1988	—
7	St. Enda's	1	0	2012	—
7	Patrick Sarsfields	1	0	2026	—

== List of finals ==
=== Legend ===
- Gold – Ulster junior club champions
- Silver – Ulster junior club runners-up

=== List of Antrim JHC finals ===
Year	Winners		Runners-up		#
Year	Club	Score	Club	Score	#
2026	Patrick Sarsfields	4-14	Lámh Dhearg	2-12	
2025	Con Magees Glenravel	2-16	Glen Rovers, Armoy	1-06	
2024	St Mary's Rasharkin	2-10	Glen Rovers, Armoy	0-14	
2023	St Brigid's Cloughmills	1-12	Glen Rovers, Armoy	0-13	
2022	Shane O'Neill's	1-21	St Mary's Rasharkin	0-16	
2021	Con Magees	1-21	Shane O'Neill's	0-16	
2020	St. Paul's	3-12	St Mary's Rasharkin	1-08	
2019	Gort na Móna	0-20	St. Paul's	0-14	
2018	Robert Emmets	1-23	Shane O'Neill's	2-07	
2017	Gort na Móna	3-12	Shane O'Neill's	3-10	
2016	Lámh Dhearg	2-10	Robert Emmets	1-12	
2015	St Mary's Rasharkin	1-12	St. Teresa's	0-12	
2014	Con Magees	1-12	St Mary's Rasharkin	0-12	
2013	Creggan Kickhams	3-08	Robert Emmets	1-09	
2012	St. Enda's	0-14	Robert Emmets	0-07	
2011	Creggan Kickhams	0-17	Con Magees	2-06	
2010	St Brigid's Cloughmills	1-16	Robert Emmets	3-07	
2009	St Mary's Rasharkin	1-14	Robert Emmets	2-06	
2008	St. Teresa's				
2007	Glen Rovers				
2006	Clooney Gaels				
2005	St. Teresa's				
2004					
2003					
2002					
2001					
2000					
1999					
1998					
1997	St Brigid's Cloughmills				
1996					
1995					
1994					
1993					
1992					
1991					
1990					
1989					
1988	Ardoyne Kickhams				

== See also ==
- Antrim Senior Hurling Championship (Tier 1)
- Antrim Intermediate Hurling Championship (Tier 2)
- Antrim Reserve Hurling Cup (Tier 4)
- Antrim Reserve Hurling Shield (Tier 5)
