= Armagh Senior Hurling Championship =

- Current season or competition: 2026 Armagh Senior Hurling Championship
- Irish: Craobh Shinsir Iomána Ard Mhacha
- Code: Hurling
- Region: Armagh (GAA)
- Trophy: Jimmy Carlisle Cup
- No. of teams: 6
- Title holders: Keady Lámh Dhearg Hurling Club (26th title)
- Most titles: Keady Lámh Dhearg Hurling Club (26 titles)

The Armagh Senior Hurling Championship is an annual hurling competition contested by top-tier Armagh GAA clubs. Hurling has always been more popular in the north and west of the county. Camlough and Bessbrook are the only south Armagh clubs to have won the Senior Championship.

Keady Lámh Dhearg are the title holders (2026) defeating Middletown Na Fianna in the Final.

== History ==
The trophy presented to the winners is the Jimmy Carlisle Cup. The winner qualifies to represent their county in either the Ulster Senior Club Hurling Championship or the Ulster Intermediate Club Hurling Championship, depending on the winner's recent record when competing at provincial level. Following their 2013 success, Cúchulainn's represented Armagh in the Ulster Intermediate Club Hurling Championship, leaving Armagh without representation in the Ulster Senior Club Hurling Championship for that year. Keady became the first Ulster Intermediate Champions from Armagh in 2007 and to date they are the first and only representatives from the county to reach the Ulster Senior Final, doing so in 2010.

== Format ==
=== Group stage ===
The 6 clubs start in the groups stage. Over the course of the group stage, each team plays once against the others in the group, resulting in each team being guaranteed four group games. Two points are awarded for a win, one for a draw and zero for a loss. The teams are ranked in the group stage table by points gained, then scoring difference and then their head-to-head record. The top two teams in the group qualify for the final.

=== Knockout stage ===
Semi-Final: The 1st placed team faces the 4th placed team and the 2nd placed team faces the 3rd placed team.

Final: The winners of the semi-final contest the final. The winning team are declared champions.

== Qualification for subsequent competitions ==
At the end of the championship, the winning team qualify to the subsequent Ulster Intermediate Club Hurling Championship, the winner of which progresses to the All-Ireland Intermediate Club Hurling Championship.

== Teams ==
=== 2026 teams ===
The 6 teams competing in the 2026 Armagh Senior Hurling Championship are:

Club	Location	Colours	Position in 2026	Championship titles	Last championship title
Craobh Rua	Bessbrook	Red and white	Group stage	0	—
Cúchulainn's	Armagh	Yellow and white	Semi-finals	24	2013
Derrynoose	Derrynoose	Blue and white	Semi-finals	0	—
Keady Lámh Dhearg	Keady	Blue and gold	Champions	26	2026
Killeavy St Moninna's	Killean	Green and black	Group stage	0	—
Middletown	Middletown	Black and white	Runners-up	21	2025

=== 2026 grades ===
Championship	Club
Senior championships
Senior	Craobh Rua
Senior	Cúchulainn's
Senior	Derrynoose
Senior	Keady Lámh Dhearg
Senior	Killeavy St Moninna's
Senior	Middletown
Junior championships
Junior	Cúchulainn's (2nd team)
Junior	Middletown (2nd team)
Junior	Seán Treacy's
Junior	St Malachy's

== Roll of honour ==
=== By club ===
#	Club	Titles	Championship wins
1	Keady Lámh Dhearg	26	1949, 1959, 1960, 1965, 1972, 1975, 1978, 1987, 1990, 1992, 1993, 1994, 1996, 1997, 1998, 2001, 2002, 2003, 2004, 2005, 2007, 2008, 2010, 2014, 2018, 2026
2	Cúchulainn's	24	1951, 1952, 1953, 1954, 1961, 1962, 1963, 1964, 1968, 1969, 1970, 1971, 1973, 1974, 1976, 1977, 1979, 1980, 1982, 1983, 1984, 1988, 1989, 2013
3	Middletown	21	1981, 1985, 1986, 1991, 1995, 1999, 2000, 2006, 2009, 2011, 2012, 2015, 2016, 2017, 2019, 2020, 2021, 2022, 2023, 2024, 2025
4	Éire Óg, Keady	3	1927, 1932, 1933
4	Keady Michael Dwyer's	3	1935, 1936, 1937
4	CBS Armagh PPU	3	1945, 1946, 1948
7	St Malachy's, Portadown	2	1966, 1967
8	Shane O'Neill's	1	1907
8	Young Irelands	1	1928
8	Red Hands, Armagh	1	1931
8	O'Donnell's, Armagh	1	1934
8	Bessbrook Geraldines	1	1947
8	Hugh Carberry's Rocks	1	1950

== List of finals ==
=== Legend ===
- Gold – Ulster intermediate club champions
- Silver – Ulster intermediate club runners-up
- (r) = replay

=== List of Armagh SHC finals ===
Year	Winners		Runners-up	
Year	Club	Score	Club	Score
2026	Keady Lámh Dhearg	0-17	Middletown Na Fianna	0-15
2025	Middletown Na Fianna	0-21	Keady Lámh Dhearg	0–19
2024	Middletown Na Fianna	1–12	Keady Lámh Dhearg	0–13
2023	Middletown Na Fianna	1–15	Keady Lámh Dhearg	0–11
2022	Middletown Na Fianna	1–19	Keady Lámh Dhearg	2–12
2021	Middletown	2-20	Keady Lámh Dhearg	2–12
2020	Middletown	0-20	Cúchulainn's	1-06
2019	Middletown	2–17	Keady Lámh Dhearg	1–13
2018	Keady Lámh Dhearg	0–16	Middletown	0–13
2017	Middletown	0–17	Keady Lámh Dhearg	1–12
2016	Middletown	2–19	Cúchulainn's	2-08
2015	Middletown	2–10	Keady Lámh Dhearg	1-08
2014	Keady Lámh Dhearg	2–19	Cúchulainn's	1–13
2013	Cúchulainn's	1-07, 2-12 (r)	Keady Lámh Dhearg	0–10, 1-13 (r)
2012	Middletown	0–13	Cúchulainn's	0–12
2011	Middletown	0–19	Keady Lámh Dhearg	0–10
2010	Keady Lámh Dhearg	0–13	Cúchulainn's	0–09
2009	Middletown	3–14	Keady Lámh Dhearg	0–14
2008	Keady Lámh Dhearg		Middletown	
2007	Keady Lámh Dhearg		Middletown	
2006	Middletown		Keady Lámh Dhearg	
2005	Keady Lámh Dhearg		Cúchulainn's	
2004	Keady Lámh Dhearg		Cúchulainn's	
2003	Keady Lámh Dhearg		Middletown	
2002	Keady Lámh Dhearg		Middletown	
2001	Keady Lámh Dhearg		Middletown	
2000	Middletown			
1999	Middletown		Keady Lámh Dhearg	
1998	Keady Lámh Dhearg			
1997	Keady Lámh Dhearg			
1996	Keady Lámh Dhearg			
1995	Middletown			
1994	Keady Lámh Dhearg		Cúchulainn's	
1993	Keady Lámh Dhearg		Cúchulainn's	
1992	Keady Lámh Dhearg			
1991	Middletown			
1990	Keady Lámh Dhearg			
1989	Cúchulainn's			
1988	Cúchulainn's			
1987	Keady Lámh Dhearg			
1986	Middletown	3-08	Cúchulainn's	2-06
1985	Middletown			
1984	Cúchulainn's		Middletown	
1983	Cúchulainn's		Portadown	
1982	Cúchulainn's		Middletown	
1981	Middletown		Keady Lámh Dhearg	
1980	Cúchulainn's		Keady Lámh Dhearg	
1979	Cúchulainn's		Keady Lámh Dhearg	
1978	Keady Lámh Dhearg		Seán Treacy's	
1977	Cúchulainn's		Seán Treacy's	
1976	Cúchulainn's		Keady Lámh Dhearg	
1975	Keady Lámh Dhearg		Cuchulain's	
1974	Cúchulainn's			
1973	Cúchulainn's			
1972	Keady Lámh Dhearg			
1971	Cúchulainn's			
1970	Cúchulainn's			
1969	Cúchulainn's			
1968	Cúchulainn's			
1967	St Malachy's, Portadown			
1966	St Malachy's, Portadown			
1965	Keady Lámh Dhearg			
1964	Cúchulainn's			
1963	Cúchulainn's			
1962	Cúchulainn's			
1961	Cúchulainn's			
1960	Keady Lámh Dhearg			
1959	Keady Lámh Dhearg			
1955–1958	No competition			
1954	Cúchulainn's			
1953	Cúchulainn's			
1952	Cúchulainn's			
1951	Cúchulainn's			
1950	Hugh Carberry's Rocks			
1949	Keady Lámh Dhearg			
1948	CBS Armagh PPU			
1947	Bessbrook Geraldines			
1946	CBS Armagh PPU			
1945	CBS Armagh PPU			
1938–1944	No competition			
1937	Keady Michael Dwyer's			
1936	Keady Michael Dwyer's			
1935	Keady Michael Dwyer's			
1934	O'Donnell's, Armagh			
1933	Éire Óg, Keady			
1932	Éire Óg, Keady			
1931	Red Hands, Armagh			
1929–1930	No competition			
1928	Young Irelands			
1927	Éire Óg, Keady			
1908–1926				
1907	Shane O'Neill's Camlough			

== Armagh Intermediate Hurling Championship ==
Armagh Senior Hurling Championship
- Code: Hurling
- Region: Armagh (GAA)
- No. of teams: 6
- Title holders: Killeavy St Moninna's (2nd title)

The Armagh Intermediate Hurling Championship (Abbreviated to the Armagh IHC) is an annual hurling competition organised by the Armagh County Board of the Gaelic Athletic Association and contested by the junior clubs in the county of Armagh in Ireland. It is the second tier in the Armagh hurling championship system. Up to 2025 it was called Armagh Junior Hurling Championship.

St Malachy's are the title holders, defeating St. Malachy's by 2–13 to 1–09 in the 2025 final.

=== Format ===
Group stage: The 4 clubs start in the groups stage. Over the course of the group stage, each team plays once against the others in the group, resulting in each team being guaranteed four group games. Two points are awarded for a win, one for a draw and zero for a loss. The teams are ranked in the group stage table by points gained, then scoring difference and then their head-to-head record. The top two teams in the group qualify for the semi-finals.

Semi-Finals: The top two teams face the 5th and 6th placed teams from the senior championship. The 2 winners qualify for the final.

Final: The winners of the semi-final contest the final. The winning team are declared champions and promoted to the Armagh Senior Hurling Championship.

=== Qualification for subsequent competitions ===
At the end of the championship, the winning team qualify to the subsequent Ulster Junior Club Hurling Championship, the winner of which progresses to the All-Ireland Junior Club Hurling Championship.

=== List of finals (2023–) ===
Year	Winners		Runners-up		#
Year	Club	Score	Club	Score	#
2026	Killeavy St Moninna's	0-19	Seán Treacy's	0-11	
2025	St Malachy's	3-12 2-13 (r)	Middletown II	2-15 1-09 (r)	
2024	Seán Treacy's	0–11	Keady Lámh Dhearg	1–05	
2023	Killeavy St Moninna's	2–17	Seán Treacy's	2–12	

=== Roll of honour (2023–) ===
Club	Titles	Runners-up	Years won	Years runners-up
Killeavy St Moninna's	2	0	2023, 2026	—
Seán Treacy's	1	2	2024	2023, 2026
St Malachy's	1	0	2025	—
Keady Lámh Dhearg	0	1	—	2024
Middletown II	0	1	—	2025

== See also ==
- Armagh Senior Football Championship
