= 2010–11 All-Ireland Intermediate Club Hurling Championship =

Championship Details
- Dates: 3 October 2010 – 13 February 2011
- Teams: 21

All Ireland Champions
- Winners: Ballymartle (1st win)
- Captain: Patrick Dwyer
- Manager: Anthony McCarthy

All Ireland Runners-up
- Runners-up: Dicksboro
- Captain: Eddie O'Donoghue
- Manager: Liam Maher

Provincial Champions
- Munster: Ballymartle
- Leinster: Dicksboro
- Ulster: St. John's
- Connacht: Pádraig Pearse's

Championship Statistics
- Matches Played: 20
- Total Goals: 74 (3.70 per game)
- Total Points: 459 (22.95 per game)
- Top Scorer: Martin Gaffney (1–30)

The 2010–11 All-Ireland Intermediate Club Hurling Championship was the seventh staging of the All-Ireland Intermediate Club Hurling Championship since its establishment by the Gaelic Athletic Association in 2004. The championship ran from 3 October 2010 to 13 February 2011.

The All-Ireland final was played on 13 February 2011 at Croke Park in Dublin, between Ballymartle from Cork and Dicksboro from Kilkenny. Ballymartle won the match by 3–15 to 1–20 to claim their first ever All-Ireland title.

Dicksboro's Martin Gaffney was the championship's top scorer with 1–30.

== Connacht Intermediate Club Hurling Championship ==
=== Connacht semi-final ===
| 24 October 2010 Semi-final | Four Roads | 2-13 - 3-13 | Ballyhaunis | Athleague Grounds |
| | J Lalor 0-8, M Kelly 1-1, S Curley 1-1, J Coyne 0-3. | | K Higgins 1-7, S Hoban 1-2, D O'Brien 1-0, T Buckley 0-2, P Higgins 0-1, N Murphy 0-1. |

=== Connacht final ===
| 14 November 2010 Final | Pádraig Pearse's | 1-14 - 1-10 | Ballyhaunis | Athleague Grounds |
| | T Flannery 0-10 (0-8f, 0-1 '65'), C Donnellan 1-2 (1-0pen), J Gelston 0-2. | Report | K Higgins 0-7 (0-7f), S Hoban 1-2, D McConn 0-1. |

== Leinster Intermediate Club Hurling Championship ==
=== Leinster quarter-finals ===
| 24 October 2010 Quarter-final | Dicksboro | 4-08 - 0-19 | HWH–Bunclody | Palmerstown Grounds |
| | E O'Donoghue 1-4, A Stapleton 1-2, M Gaffney 1-2, P O'Flynn 1-0. | Report | P Atkinson 0-8, M Connors 0-4, C Farrell 0-3, N Kelly 0-2, E Slevin 0-1, D Kehoe 0-1. |

| 25 October 2010 Quarter-final | St Mullin's | 1-13 - 3-08 | Glenealy | Dr Cullen Park |
| | S Murphy (1-1); P Coady (0-7); P Walsh, C Ryan, D Murphy, Paul Kehoe and Paudie Kehoe (0-1 each). | Report | L Glynn (1-2); J O'Neill (0-5), W O'Gorman and A Driver (1-0 each); N Driver (0-1). |

=== Leinster semi-finals ===
| 7 November 2010 Semi-final | Dicksboro | 8-07 - 1-14 | Kildalkey | Nowlan Park |
| | A Stapleton 4-2, E O'Donoghue 2-1, S Maher 2-0, M Gaffney 0-2, D O'Gorman 0-1, P O'Flynn 0-1. | Report | N Kirby 0-6, D Doran 1-0, P Keogh 0-3, P Geoghegan 0-2, S Heavey 0-2, G Kelly 0-1. |

| 7 November 2010 Semi-final | Glenealy | 2-07 - 1-15 | Celbridge | Aughrim County Grounds |
| | L Glynn 2-6, W O'Gorman 0-1. | Report | B White 0-7, J Houlihan 0-4, T Murphy 1-0, C Kenny 0-2, M Moloney 0-1, L Quinn 0-1. |

=== Leinster final ===
| 21 November 2010 Final | Dicksboro | 5-09 - 0-08 | Celbridge | Nowlan Park |
| | P O'Flynn 3-1, S Maher 2-0, E O'Donoghue 0-5, M Gaffney 0-2, O Walsh 0-1. | | B White 0-4, L Quinn 0-2, M Moloney 0-1. | Referee: D Hughes (Carlow) |

== Munster Intermediate Club Hurling Championship ==
=== Munster quarter-finals ===
| 3 October 2010 Quarter-final | Killanena | 3-10 - 2-14 | Borrisokane | O'Garney Park |
| | M Flaherty 2-6, S Moloney 1-0, R Flaherty 0-2, M Noone 0-1, J Noonan 0-1. | | P Austin 1-4, C Larkin 0-6, S Dooley 1-0, T Slevin 0-2, G Harding 0-1, E Larkin 0-1. | Referee: C Lyons (Cork) |

| 31 October 2010 Quarter-final | Ballyduff | 2-09 - 2-11 | Hospital-Herbertstown | Ballyduff Grounds |
| | B O'Sullivan 0-5, G O'Brien 1-1, M Boyle 1-0, J Bowler 0-1, B O'Grady 0-1, P Boyle 0-1. | | K O'Loughlin 2-1, M Deegan 0-5, J Fitzgerald 0-3, K O'Connor 0-2. | Referee: G Hoey (Clare) |

=== Munster semi-finals ===
| 7 November 2010 Semi-final | Borrisokane | 2-13 - 0-11 | Roanmore | MacDonagh Park |
| | C Larkin 0-6, G Harding 1-0, S Dooley 1-0, S Cleary 0-3, A Hogan 0-1, G McMahon 0-1, R Davis 0-1, T Slevin 0-1. | | B Nolan 0-3, S Flynn 0-2, D Murphy 0-2, T Aldridge 0-1, C O'Byrne 0-1, C Chester 0-1, C Burke 0-1. | Referee: D Copps (Cork) |

| 7 November 2010 Semi-final | Hospital-Herbertstown | 0-09 - 0-15 | Ballymartle | Ballyagran Grounds |
| | J Fitzgerald 0-3, M Deegan 0-3, K O'Loughlin 0-1, B O'Donoghue 0-1, Donie Reale 0-1. | | B Dwyer 0-7, R Dwyer 0-4, B Corry 0-3, D Dwyer 0-1. | Referee: J Ryan (Boherlahan-Dualla) |

=== Munster final ===
| 21 November 2010 Final | Ballymartle | 2-14 - 0-08 | Borrisokane | Gaelic Grounds |
| | D Dwyer 2-1, B Dwyer 0-6, B Corry 0-4, J Dwyer 0-2, R Dwyer 0-1. | | C Larkin 0-2, A Hogan 0-2, T Slevin 0-2, S Dooley 0-1, B Davis 0-1. | Referee: M O'Connor (Limerick) |

== Ulster Intermediate Club Hurling Championship ==
=== Ulster quarter-final ===
| 3 October 2010 Quarter-final | Éire Óg Carrickmore | 1-21 - 0-03 | Bredagh | Dungannon Grounds |
| | C Grogan 1-5, A Kelly 0-8, J Kelly 0-3, G Fox 0-2, T Hughes 0-1, P Hughes 0-1, R McCallin 0-1. | | I Galway 0-2, G Murray 0-1. |

=== Ulster semi-finals ===
| 10 October 2010 Semi-final | Éire Óg Carrickmore | 7-11 - 3-10 | Armagh Cú Chulainns | St Tiernach's Park |
| | S McLoughney 2-1, J Kelly 2-0, C Grogan 2-0, A Kelly 0-6, P Hughes 1-2, G Fox 0-1, SP Begley 0-1. | | D Coulter 0-8, Conor Coulter 1-1, T Duffy 1-0, Chris Coulter 1-0, |

| 10 October 2010 Semi-final | St John's | 5-14 - 0-09 | Lisbellaw St Patrick's | Casement Park |
| | Brian McFall 3-5, N McCallin 1-1, L Boyle 1-0, Barry McFall 0-3, C McFall 0-3, C McSteen 0-2. | | J Duffy 0-4, R Bogue 0-4, JP McGarry 0-1. |

=== Ulster final ===
| 7 November 2010 Final | St John's | 2-11 - 1-11 | Éire Óg Carrickmore | Casement Park |
| | Brian McFall 0-7 (0-4f,), L Boyle 2-1, M O’Neill 0-2, G Clarke 0-1. | Report | J Kerr 0-5 (0-4f), C Grogan 1-1, J Kelly 0-3 (0-1 pen), A Kelly 0-2. |

== All-Ireland Intermediate Club Hurling Championship ==
=== All-Ireland quarter-final ===
| 15 January 2011 Quarter-final | Kilburn Gaels | 2-04 - 2-13 | Dicksboro | Emerald GAA Grounds |
| | M O'Dwyer 1-2 (1-2f), J Reddan 1-1, S Olden 0-1 (1f). | Report | E O'Donoghue 0-7 (4f, 2 '65), C Starr 2-1, O Walsh, P O'Flynn 0-2 each, M Gaffney 0-1. |

=== All-Ireland semi-finals ===
| 30 January 2011 Semi-final | St John's | 1-09 - 0-16 | Dicksboro | Cusack Park |
| | B McFall 0-7 (0-3f, 1 s-l, 0-1 '65'), L Boyle 1-0, S McCrory, N McCallin 0-1 each. | Report | M Gaffney 0-11 (0-6f), O Walsh 0-2, P O'Flynn, A Stapleton, C Starr 0-1 each. |

| 30 January 2011 Semi-final | Ballymartle | 1-10 - 0-10 | Pádraig Pearse's | Templetuohy Grounds |
| | B Dwyer 0-4 (0-3f), D McCarthy 0-3, J Dwyer 1-0, R Dwyer 0-2 (0-1f), S Corry 0-1. | Report | T Flannery 0-10 (0-8f, 1 '65'). |

=== All-Ireland final ===
| 13 February 2011 Final | Ballymartle | 3-15 - 1-20 | Dicksboro | Croke Park |
| | B Dwyer 1-7 (1-3 frees, 0-2 ‘65); Darren McCarthy (1-0 free), J Dwyer 1-2 each; D Edmonds 0-2; Dan Dwyer, J Kelly 0-1 each. | Report | M Gaffney 0-12 (0-8 frees); A Stapleton 1-2; P O’Flynn 0-4; C O’Loughlin, S Maher 0-1 each. | Referee: A Kelly (Galway) |

== Championship statistics ==
=== Top scorers ===
| Rank | Player | Club | Tally | Total | Matches | Average |
|---|---|---|---|---|---|---|
| 1 | Martin Gaffney | Dicksboro | 1-30 | 33 | 6 | 5.50 |
| 2 | Brian McFall | St John's | 3-19 | 28 | 3 | 9.33 |
| 3 | Barry Dwyer | Ballymartle | 1-24 | 27 | 4 | 6.75 |
| 4 | Eddie O'Donoghue | Dicksboro | 3-17 | 26 | 4 | 6.50 |
| 5 | Adrian Stapleton | Dicksboro | 6-07 | 25 | 6 | 4.16 |
| 6 | Paul O'Flynn | Dicksboro | 4-09 | 21 | 6 | 3.50 |
| 7 | Thomas Flannery | Pádraig Pearse's | 0-20 | 20 | 2 | 10.00 |
| 8 | Conor Grogan | Éire Óg Carrickmore | 4-06 | 18 | 3 | 6.00 |
| 9 | Leighton Glynn | Glenealy | 3-08 | 17 | 2 | 8.50 |
| 9 | Keith Higgins | Ballyhaunis | 1-14 | 17 | 2 | 8.50 |
