= 2003 Munster Intermediate Club Hurling Championship =

2003 All-Ireland Intermediate Club Hurling Championship
- Dates: 15 February - 21 March 2004
- Teams: 6
- Champions: Bride Rovers (1st title); Seán Ryan (captain); Jack Russell (manager)
- Runners-up: Kilruane MacDonaghs

Tournament statistics
- Matches played: 5
- Goals scored: 16 (3.2 per match)
- Points scored: 113 (22.6 per match)
- Top scorer(s): Brian Gaynor (6-17)

The 2003 Munster Intermediate Club Hurling Championship was the inaugural staging of the Munster Intermediate Club Hurling Championship. The competition ran from 15 February to 21 March 2004.

The Munster final was played on 21 March 2004 at FitzGerald Park in Kilmallock, between Bride Rovers of Cork and Kilruane MacDonaghs of Tipperary, in what was their first ever championship meeting. Bride Rovers won the match by 0-14 to 0-11 to claim, what remains, their only title.

Brian Gaynor was the championship's top scorer with 6-17.

== Results ==
=== Munster quarter-finals ===
15 February 2004 Quarter-final	Kilmoyley	1-06 - 4-16	Kilruane MacDonaghs	Lerrig Grounds
	O Diggins 1-2, M Regan 0-3, T Murnane 0-1.		B Gaynor 3-6, M O'Leary 1-4, R Casey 0-2, R McLoughney 0-2, S Williams 0-1, W Darcy 0-1.

22 February 2004 Quarter-final	Abbeyside	0-12 - 3-05	Bride Rovers	Ardmore Grounds

=== Munster semi-finals ===
29 February 2004 Quarter-final	Bride Rovers	3-11 - 1-11	Broadford	Páirc na Bríde

29 February 2004 Semi-final	Kilruane MacDonaghs	3-16 - 1-11	Tourafulla	MacDonagh Park
	B Gaynor 3-6, M O'Leary 0-6, R McLoughney 0-2, E Morkan 0-2.		G O'Connor 1-1, N Curtin 0-4, P Sheahan 0-3, JP Sheahan 0-2, N Curtin 0-1.

=== Munster final ===
21 March 2004 Final	Bride Rovers	0-14 - 0-11	Kilruane MacDonaghs	FitzGerald Park
	J O'Driscoll 0-5, S Ryan 0-3, R Cahill 0-2, B Johnson 0-1, B Walsh 0-1, T Broderick 0-1, P Cotter 0-1.		B Gaynor 0-5, M O'Leary 0-3, P Williams 0-1, R Casey 0-1, S Williams 0-1.	Referee: D Richardson (Limerick)
