= Keady Lámh Dhearg Hurling Club =

Armagh-based Gaelic games club

Keady Lámh Dhearg HC
- Lámh Dhearg, An Céide
- Founded: 1949
- County: Armagh
- Nickname: The Red Hands
- Colours
- Grounds: Gerard McGleenan Park
- Coordinates: 54°35′18″N 6°02′17″W

Playing kits
Standard colours

Senior Club Championships
	All Ireland	Ulster champions	Armagh champions
Hurling:	0	0	26

Keady Lámh Dhearg Hurling Club (Irish [l̪ˠãːw ˈjaɾˠəɡ] is a Gaelic Athletic Association club in Keady, County Armagh, Northern Ireland. The club, affiliated to the Armagh County Board, is exclusively concerned with the game of hurling; a sister club, Keady Michael Dwyer's GFC, provides for Gaelic football.

== History ==
Hurling had been served by a number of clubs in the area over the years, with Éire Óg winning Armagh SHC titles in 1927, 1932 and 1933, and Michael Dwyer's winning titles in 1935, 1936 and 1937. The latter has since become a Gaelic football-only club. Keady Lámh Dhearg was founded in 1949 and immediatley made an impact by winning the Armagh SHC title in their inaugural year.

A decade passed before Keady Lámh Dhearg claimed their second Armagh SHC title in 1959. The club retained the title for the first time in their history in 1960. Keady Lámh Dhearg won Armagh SHC titles at regular intervals in the decades that followed. The club won its 10th Armagh SHC title in 1992, a title win that resulted in Keady taking over from Cúchulainns as the dominant force in Armagh hurling. It was the first of three consecutive titles for the club.

The 21st century saw Keady Lámh Dhearg assert their dominance as a hurling force and develop a rivalry with Middletown Na Fianna. The club won a record five consecutive titles between 2001 and 2005. Six-in-a-row proved beyond Keady, however, the club returned to win back-to-back SHC titles in 2007 and 2008. Keady Lámh Dhearg became the first team from Armagh to win a provincial title, when they beat Liatroim Fontenoys by 1–15 to 0–06 to claim the Ulster Club IHC title in 2007.

Keady Lámh Dhearg beat Cúchulainn's by 0–13 to 0–09 to win a record-equalling 23rd Armagh SHC title in 2010. Middletown Na Fianna were beaten in the final in 2018, allowing Keady to claim top spot on the all-time roll of honour with their 25th Armagh SHC title. The club's most recent success came in 2026, when Keady avoided a sixth consecutive final defeat after beating Middletown by 0–17 to 0–15 in the final.

== Honours ==
- Armagh Senior Hurling Championship (26): 1949, 1959, 1960, 1965, 1972, 1975, 1978, 1987, 1990, 1992, 1993, 1994, 1996, 1997, 1998, 2001, 2002, 2003, 2004, 2005, 2007, 2008, 2010, 2014, 2018, 2026
- Ulster Intermediate Club Hurling Championship (1): 2007
