= Seán Treacy's HC (Lurgan) =

Hurling club in County Armagh

Seán Treacy's
- Seán Ó Treasaigh, An Lorgain
- Founded: 1973
- County: Armagh
- Colours: Maroon and White
- Grounds: The Hurling Field, Lurgan
- Coordinates: 54°28′38″N 6°19′51″W

Playing kits
Standard colours

Seán Treacy's Hurling Club is a hurling club based in Lurgan, County Armagh, Northern Ireland.

== History ==
The club was founded in 1973 and was named for IRA combatant Seán Treacy (1895–1920). They won a minor title in 1975 and reached the final of the Armagh Senior Hurling Championship in 1977 and 1978. They have won seven junior titles as well.

It is the only hurling club in Lurgan.

== Honours ==
=== Hurling ===
- Armagh Junior Hurling Championship (7): 2006, 2009, 2016, 2018, 2019, 2022, 2024
- Armagh Minor Hurling Championship (1): 1975
