= Robert Emmets GAC Cushendun =

Gaelic games club in County Antrim, Northern Ireland

Robert Emmets
- Roibéard Éiméid
- Founded: 1904
- County: Antrim
- Nickname: Emmets
- Colours
- Grounds: Páirc Lig-an-Airgid

Playing kits
Standard colours

Senior Club Championships
	All Ireland	Ulster champions	Antrim champions
Hurling:	0	0	1

Robert Emmets GAC Cushendun is a Gaelic Athletic Association club in Cushendun, County Antrim, Northern Ireland. The club is affiliated to the Antrim County Board and is solely concerned with the game of hurling.

== History ==
Located in the village of Cushendun, off the A2 coast road between Cushendall and Ballycastle, the club was founded in 1904. Initially known as Brian Borus, the new club took part in the first Feis na nGleann hurling competition. The name Robert Emmets was later adopted.

Robert Emmets had its most notable success in 1931, when the club claimed its sole Antrim SHC title after beating O'Connells in the final. In spite of this, the club has spent most of its existence operating in the junior grade. Robert Emmets won its first Antrim JHC title in 1963, before returning to the top tier a decade later after winning the Antrim IHC title in 1973. The club claimed further such titles in 1992 and 2007.

Robert Emmets won a second Antrim JHC title in 2018, following a 1–23 to 2–07 win over Shane O'Neills in the final. The club were subsequently beaten by Castleblayney in the 2018 Ulster Club JHC final. Robert Emmets' most recent success came in 2026, when the club won a fourth Antrim IHC title.

== Honours ==
- Antrim Senior Hurling Championship (1): 1931
- Antrim Intermediate Hurling Championship (4): 1973, 1992, 2007, 2026
- Antrim Junior Hurling Championship (2): 1963, 2018

== Notable players ==
- John McCaughan: Nicky Rackard Cup-winner (2005)
