= Belgooly =

Village in County Cork, Ireland

Belgooly Béal Guala
- Village
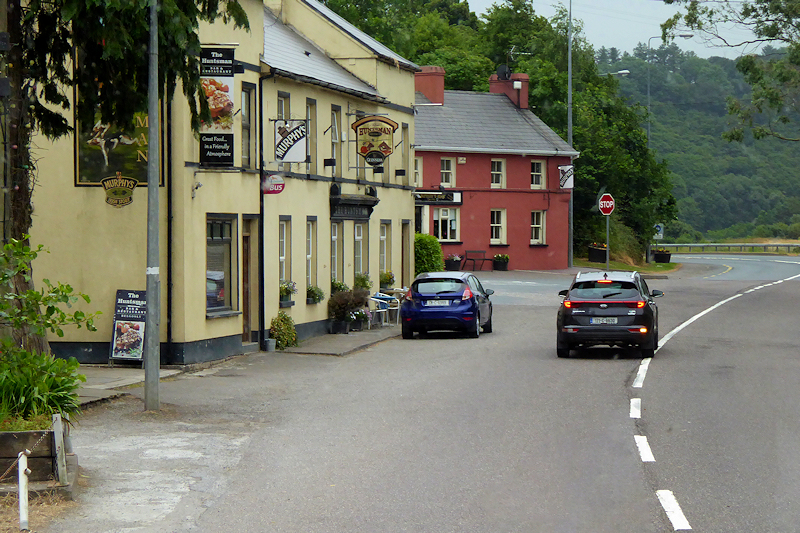
- Belgooly village with The Huntsman Bar and Coleman's public houses

- Location in Ireland
- Coordinates: 51°44′21″N 8°29′8″W
- Country: Ireland
- Province: Munster
- County: County Cork

Population (2022)
  - Total: 823
- Time zone: UTC+0 (WET)
  - Summer (DST): UTC-1 (IST (WEST))
- Irish grid reference: W666538

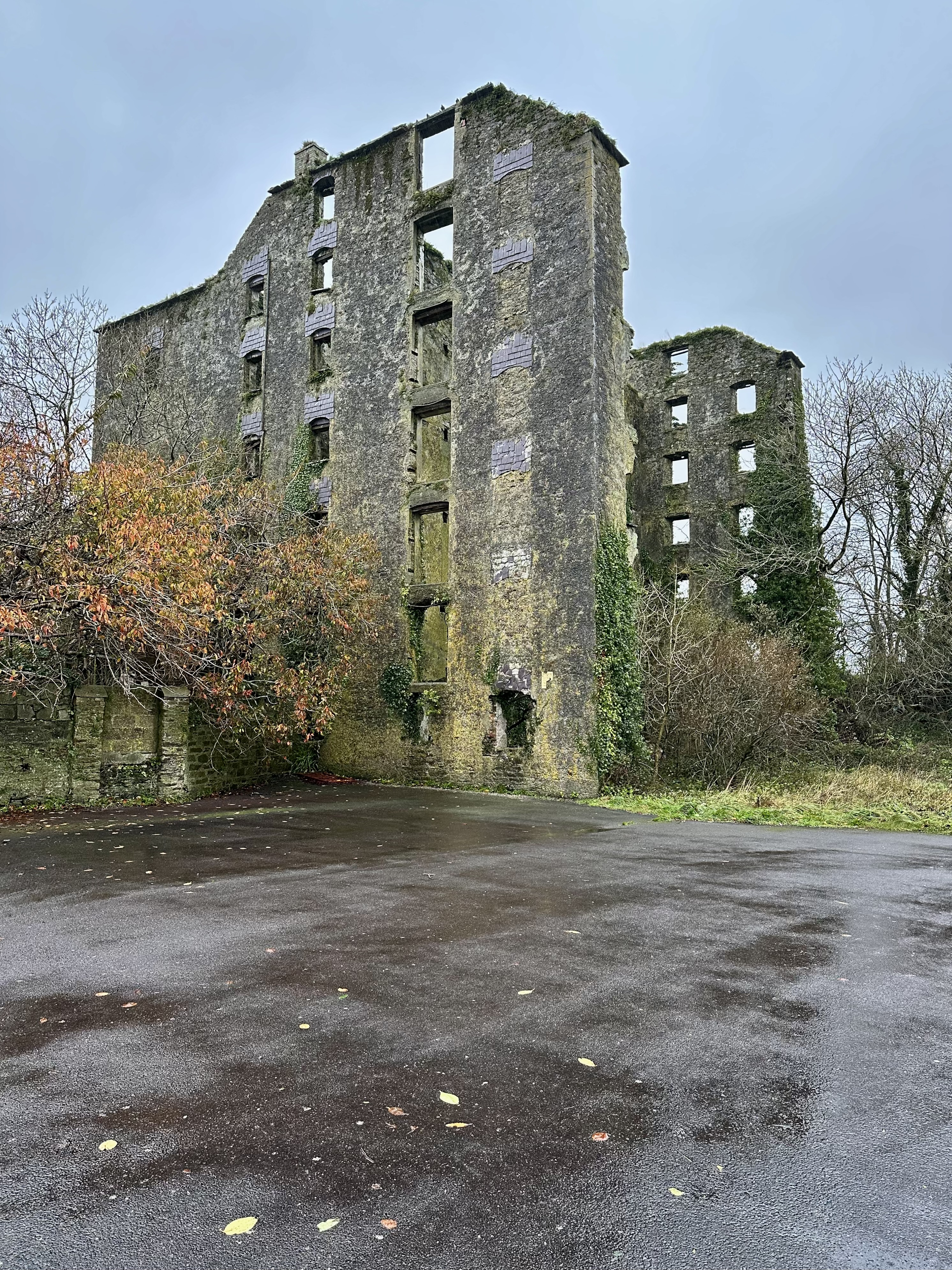
Ruins of the flour mill

Belgooly (Irish: Béal Guala is a village in County Cork, Ireland, located 4.6 kilometres to the north-east of Kinsale. In 2022 it had a population of 823.

== History ==
The Belgooly Flour Mill, a ruinous building within the village, is entered in the initial Record of Protected Structures. Other, more ancient monuments, included on the Record of Monuments and Places for County Cork, include a reputed holy well site immediately west of the village, and a standing stone to the south in Mitchelstown East townland.

On 26 August 1941 a Luftwaffe Junkers Ju 88 crashed close to Belgooly, after being shot down by 615 Squadron of the RAF.

== Amenities and development ==
The village has a small shop with a post office, Belgooly GAA club facilities, Church of the Sacred Heart Roman Catholic church, and is home to the 'Huntsman' and 'Coleman's' public houses (the latter in business since at least 1914).

The village is located within the study area of the Cork Area Strategic Plan and the lands that surround the village are within the designated Cork County Council "Rural Housing Control Zone". There has been an increase in residential housing development in Belgooly in the early 21st century, with (according to the 2016 census) 200 of the village's 258 private homes built between 2001 and 2010.

On the Kinsale side of the town is a statue named "His Master's Voice". Belgooly hosts an annual agricultural show and steam rally.

== Landscape and transport ==
The main road through the village is the R600, which links the village with the city of Cork to the north and Kinsale to the south. The R611, which links Belgooly with Carrigaline extends eastwards from the village. The village is served by a public bus service, route 226, which travels from Kinsale via Belgooly and Cork Airport to Cork city centre.

The River Stick flows on the western edge of the village and joins the Belgooly River which flows in the tidal Belgooly Estuary to the south of the village, before running to Oysterhaven Bay.
