= Eoin Reid =

Irish hurler

Personal information
- Native name: Eoin Ó Maoildeirg (Irish)
- Born: 27 December 1984 (age 41) Ballyhale, County Kilkenny, Ireland
- Occupation: Accountant
- Height: 6 ft 1 in (185 cm)

Sport
- Sport: Hurling
- Position: Right corner-forward
Club
- Years: Club
- 2002-present: Ballyhale Shamrocks
Club titles
- Kilkenny titles: 10
- Leinster titles: 7
- All-Ireland Titles: 5
College
- Years: College
- 2003-2007: Waterford Institute of Technology
College titles
- Fitzgibbon titles: 3
Inter-county*
Years	County	Apps (scores)
2006-2010	Kilkenny	3 (0-01)
Inter-county titles
- Leinster titles: 4
- All-Irelands: 4
- NHL: 2
- All Stars: 0
- *Inter County team apps and scores correct as of 22:31, 12 March 2019.

Eoin Reid (born 27 December 1984) is an Irish hurler who plays for Kilkenny Senior Championship club Ballyhale Shamrocks. He played for the Kilkenny senior hurling team for five years, during which time he usually lined out as a corner-forward.

Reid began his hurling career at club level with Ballyhale Shamrocks. He broke onto the club's top adult team as a 16-year-old in 2002 and enjoyed his greatest successes as part of the club's All-Ireland Championship-winning teams in 2007, 2010 and 2015 2019 2020 Reid has also won six Leinster Championship medals and nine Kilkenny Championship medals. His early prowess also saw him win a Dr. Croke Cup with St. Kieran's College and 3 Fitzgibbon Cup medals with Waterford Institute of Technology.

At inter-county level, Reid was part of the successful Kilkenny minor team that won the All-Ireland Championship in 2002 before later winning an All-Ireland Championship with the under-21 team in 2004. He joined the Kilkenny senior team in 2006. From his debut, Reid was better known as a panellist rather than a member of the starting fifteen made a combined total of 10 National League and Championship appearances in a career that ended in 2010. During that time he was part of four All-Ireland Championship-winning teams – in 2006, 2007, 2008 and 2009. Reid also secured four consecutive Leinster Championship medals and two National Hurling League medals. He was effectively let go from the Kilkenny team in 2010.

Reid's uncle, Richie Reid, and his brothers, T. J. and Richie, have also enjoyed All-Ireland success with Kilkenny.

== Career statistics ==
Team	Year	National League			Leinster		All-Ireland		Total	
Team	Year	Division	Apps	Score	Apps	Score	Apps	Score	Apps	Score
Kilkenny	2006	Division 1B	3	0-03	0	0-00	0	0-00	3	0-03
Kilkenny	2007	Division 1B	0	0-00	2	0-01	1	0-00	3	0-01
Kilkenny	2008	Division 1A	4	0-07	0	0-00	0	0-00	4	0-07
Kilkenny	2009	Division 1	0	0-00	0	0-00	0	0-00	0	0-00
Kilkenny	2010	Division 1	0	0-00	—		—		0	0-00
Career total			7	0-10	2	0-01	1	0-00	10	0-11

== Honours ==
St. Kieran's College

- All-Ireland Colleges Senior Hurling Championship (1): 2003
- Leinster Colleges Senior Hurling Championship (2): 2002, 2003

Waterford Institute of Technology

- Fitzgibbon Cup (3): 2005, 2006, 2008

Ballyhale Shamrocks

- All-Ireland Senior Club Hurling Championship (5): 2007, 2010, 2015, 2019, 2020
- Leinster Senior Club Hurling Championship (7): 2006, 2008, 2009, 2014, 2018, 2019, 2020
- Kilkenny Senior Hurling Championship (10): 2006, 2007, 2008, 2009, 2012, 2014, 2018, 2019, 2020, 2021
- Kilkenny Under-21 Hurling Championship (4): 2003, 2004, 2005, 2006

Kilkenny

- All-Ireland Senior Hurling Championship (4): 2006, 2007, 2008, 2009
- Leinster Senior Hurling Championship (4): 2006, 2007, 2008, 2009
- National Hurling League (2): 2006, 2009
- All-Ireland Under-21 Hurling Championship (1): 2004
- Leinster Under-21 Hurling Championship (1): 2004, 2005
- All-Ireland Minor Hurling Championship (1): 2002
- Leinster Minor Hurling Championship (1): 2002
