= Paul Shefflin =

Irish hurler (1980–2022)

Personal information
- Native name: Pól Ó Sibhleáin (Irish)
- Born: 30 June 1980 Ballyhale, County Kilkenny, Ireland
- Died: 4 March 2022 (aged 41) Ballyhale, County Kilkenny, Ireland
- Occupation: Accountant
- Height: 5 ft 10 in (178 cm)

Sport
- Sport: Hurling
- Position: Right wing-back
Club
- Years: Club
- Ballyhale Shamrocks
Club titles
- Kilkenny titles: 6
- Leinster titles: 4
- All-Ireland Titles: 3
College
- Years: College
- Waterford Institute of Technology
College titles
- Fitzgibbon titles: 1
Inter-county*
Years	County	Apps (scores)
2000–2001	Kilkenny	0 (0–00)
Inter-county titles
- Leinster titles: 0
- All-Irelands: 0
- NHL: 0
- All Stars: 0
- *Inter County team apps and scores correct as of 15:52, 12 December 2021.

Paul Shefflin (30 June 1980 – 4 March 2022) was an Irish hurler who played at club level with Ballyhale Shamrocks and at inter-county level with the Kilkenny senior hurling team. He usually lined out at wing-back or corner-back.

== Career ==
Shefflin first played hurling at juvenile and underage levels with the Ballyhale Shamrocks club. He simultaneously lined out as a schoolboy with St Kieran's College and subsequently won a Fitzgibbon Cup title with the Waterford Institute of Technology. After joining the Ballyhale Shamrocks senior team, he went on to win three All-Ireland Club Championship medals. Shefflin first appeared on the inter-county scene as captain of the Kilkenny minor hurling team that lost the 1998 All-Ireland minor final to Cork. He later joined the under-21 team and made a number of appearances for the Kilkenny senior hurling team in pre-season tournaments.

== Personal life and death ==
Shefflin's brothers, John and Tommy, won All-Ireland medals in the minor and under-21 grades. A third brother, Henry Shefflin, won a record ten All-Ireland medals at senior level. After graduating from Waterford Institute of Technology he worked as an accountant.

Shefflin died suddenly, while out running, on 4 March 2022, at the age of 41.

== Honours ==
Waterford Institute of Technology

- Fitzgibbon Cup: 2000

Ballyhale Shamrocks

- All-Ireland Senior Club Hurling Championship: 2007, 2010, 2015
- Leinster Senior Club Hurling Championship: 2006, 2008, 2009, 2014
- Kilkenny Senior Hurling Championship: 2006, 2007, 2008, 2009, 2012, 2014

Kilkenny

- Leinster Minor Hurling Championship: 1998 (c)

Sporting positions
Preceded by Michael Hoyne	Kilkenny minor hurling team captain 1998	Succeeded by Canice Hickey
