= 2009 Kilkenny Senior Hurling Championship =

Annual hurling competition season

- Dates: 19 September 2009 – 25 October 2009
- Teams: 12
- Sponsor: St. Canice's Credit Union
- Champions: Ballyhale Shamrocks (13th title); Éamonn Walsh (captain); Mick Fennelly (manager)
- Runners-up: James Stephens; Eoin Larkin (captain); Richie Manogue (manager)
- Relegated: Young Irelands

Tournament statistics
- Matches played: 14
- Goals scored: 37 (2.64 per match)
- Points scored: 391 (27.93 per match)
- Top scorer(s): Shane Hennessy (1-27)

The 2009 Kilkenny Senior Hurling Championship was the 115th staging of the Kilkenny Senior Hurling Championship since its establishment by the Kilkenny County Board in 1887. The championship began on 19 September 2009 and ended on 25 October 2009.

Ballyhale Shamrocks were the defending champions.

On 17 October 2009, Young Irelands were relegated from the championship following 0–19 to 0–13 defeat by Tullaroan.

On 25 October 2009, Ballyhale Shamrocks won the championship after a 1–14 to 1–11 defeat of James Stephens in the final. It was their 13th championship title overall and their fourth title in succession.

Tullaroan's Shane Hennessy was the championship's top scorer with 1-27.

== Team changes ==
=== To Championship ===
Promoted from the Kilkenny Intermediate Hurling Championship

- Erin's Own

=== From Championship ===
Relegated to the Kilkenny Intermediate Hurling Championship

- Dicksboro

== Results ==
=== First round ===
19 September 2009 First round	Dunnamaggin	1-18 - 1-08	Young Irelands	Páirc Seamróg, Ballyhale
14:00	C Herity 0-6, JJ Dunphy 1-0, K Moore 0-3, N Lahart 0-3, S O'Neill 0-3, T Maher 0-3.		P Kehoe 1-4, D Carter 0-2, T Drennan 0-1, O Carter 0-1.	Referee: E Mansfield (Cloneen)

19 September 2009 First round	St. Martin's	1-19 - 1-10	Carrickshock	Nowlan Park, Kilkenny
17:00	John Maher 0-8, S Coonan 1-2, D Maher 0-4, E McGrath 0-3, J Dowling 0-1, J Mulhall 0-1.		R Power 1-5, M Rice 0-1, M Rohan 0-1, John Power 0-1, D Franks 0-1, Jamie Power 0-1.	Referee: J Fitzgerald (Piltown)

20 September 2009 First round	Erin's Own	3-11 - 2-14	Fenians	Páirc Lachtáin, Freshford
13:00	D Buggy 2-2, M Boran 0-7, D Meally 1-0, G Byrne 0-1, C Fogarty 0-1.		K Reied 0-6, PJ Delaney 1-1, K Power 1-1, J Broderick 0-2, J Henderson 0-1, L Ryan 0-1, K Grehan 0-1, D Tobin 0-1.	Referee: D Connolly (Mooncoin)

20 September 2009 First round	Graigue-Ballycallan	1-13 - 0-15	Tullaroan	Nowlan Park, Kilkenny
13:00	K Cleere 0-6, E Brennan 0-4, J Ryall 1-0, D Walton 0-1, C Hoyne 0-1, D Heaphy 0-1.		S Hennessy 0-4, M Simpson 0-3, P Doheny 0-3, J Coogan 0-2, Martin Walsh 0-1, Michael Walsh 0-1, P Walsh 0-1.	Referee: P Dunphy (Carrigeen)

26 September 2009 First round Replay	Erin's Own	1-11 - 0-13	Fenians	Páirc Lachtáin, Freshford
15:00	D Buggy 1-2, M Boran 0-4, M Murphy 0-2, G Byrne 0-1, R Ryan 0-1, M Moran 0-1.		K Reid 0-4, PJ Delaney 0-4, K Grehan 0-1, D Tobin 0-1, J Broderick 0-1, K Power 0-1, D Dermody 0-1.	Referee: P Dunphy (Carrigeen)

=== Relegation play-off ===
10 October 2009 Play-off	Young Irelands	1-16 - 2-13	Tullaroan	John Locke Park, Callan
	P Holden 0-7, T Drennan 1-3, D Carroll 0-3, S Kehoe 0-1, D Carter 0-1, JJ Lennon 0-1.		S Hennessy 1-8, P Walsh 1-1, Martin Walsh 0-2, T Walsh 0-1, M Simpson 0-1.	Referee: D Connolly (Mooncoin)

17 October 2009 Play-off Replay	Young Irelands	0-13 - 0-19	Tullaroan	John Locke Park, Callan
16:30	P Holden 0-6, T Drennan 0-2, S Byrne 0-1, O Carter 0-1, D Carter 0-1, D Carroll 0-1, S Kehoe 0-1.		S Hennessy 0-13, T Walsh 0-3, P Walsh 0-1, J Coogan 0-1, M Walsh 0-1.	Referee: J Bennett (Tullogher-Rosbercon)

=== Quarter-finals ===
26 September 2009 Quarter-final	O'Loughlin Gaels	1-16 - 1-14	Dunnamaggin	Thoamstown Sportsfield, Thomastown
15:00	M Bergin 0-6, M Comerford 0-4, P Kelly 1-0, B Dowling 0-3, M Nolan 0-2, D Loughnane 0-1.		C Herity 0-7, D Herity 1-0, K Moore 0-2, JJ Dunphy 0-2, A Hickey 0-1, M O'Neill 0-1, T Maher 0-1.	Referee: D Connolly (Mooncoin)

27 September 2009 Quarter-final	James Stephens	3-18 - 1-17	St. Martin's	Nowlan Park, Kilkenny
17:00	D Walton 1-3, E Larkin 1-2, J Murray 1-0, N Tyrrell 0-3, G Whelan 0-3, M Ruth 0-3, D Cody 0-3, E McCormack 0-1.		John Maher 0-8, J Mulhall 1-3, E McGrath 0-2, P Maher 0-2, J Dowling 0-1, S Coonan 0-1.	Referee: J Guinan (St. Lachtain's)

27 September 2009 Quarter-final	Ballyhale Shamrocks	5-21 - 2-15	Graigue Ballycallan	John Locke Park, Callan
14:00	Henry Shefflin 1-7, E Reid 2-3, P Reid 1-2, M Aylward 1-1, C Fennelly 0-4, TJ Reid 0-2, M Fennelly 0-1, J Fitzpatrick 0-1.		K Cleere 1-7, E Brennan 1-3, J Ryall 0-3, M Hoyne 0-2.	Referee: E Mansfield (Cloneen)

3 October 2009 Quarter-final	Erin's Own	0-14 - 0-12	Clara	Nowlan Park, Kilkenny
17:00	M Boran 0-7, M Murphy 0-2, D Buggy 0-2, M Moran 0-1, R Ryan 0-1, D Meally 0-1.		K Hogan 0-7, D Prendergast 0-2, B Phelan 0-2, L Ryan 0-1.	Referee: G Rafter (Threecastles)

=== Semi-finals ===
11 October 2009 Semi-final	James Stephens	2-07 - 0-11	Erin's Own	Nowlan Park
13:45	E Larkin 1-4 (three frees); M Ruth 1-1; G Whelan, E McCormack 0-1 each.		M Boran 0-9 (six frees, one 65); D Meally, M Murphy 0-1 each.	Referee: P Dunphy

11 October 2009 Semi-final	Ballyhale Shamrocks	4-16 - 2-12	O'Loughlin Gaels	Nowlan Park
15:30	TJ Reid 2-4 (0-1 a free); H Shefflin (two frees), C Fennelly 0-4 each; M Aylward 1-1; B Costelloe 1-0; D Hoyne, E Reid 0-1 each.		M Bergin 0-7 (six frees); P Dowling 2-0; P Kelly 0-2; M Comerford, M Kelly, B Hogan 0-1 each.	Referee: E Mansfield

=== Final ===
25 October 2009 Final	Ballyhale Shamrocks	1-14 - 1-11	James Stephens	Nowlan Park
15:00	TJ Reid 0-6; E Reid 1-3; H Shefflin 0-3 (all frees); J Fitzpatrick, C Fennelly 0-1 each.	Report	E Larkin 0-5 (all frees); E McCormack 1-0; D Walton 0-2; M Ruth, N Tyrell, J Tyrell, D Cody (free), 0-1 each.	Referee: P Dunphy

== Championship statistics ==
=== Top scorers ===
Top scorers overall

Rank	Player	Club	Tally	Total	Matches	Average
1	Shane Hennessy	Tullaroan	1-25	28	3	9.33
2	Martin Boran	Erin's Own	0-27	27	4	6.75
3	T. J. Reid	Ballyhale Shamrocks	2-12	18	3	6.00
4	Eoin Larkin	James Stephens	2-11	17	3	5.66
4	Henry Shefflin	Ballyhale Shamrocks	1-14	17	3	5.66
5	Eoin Reid	Ballyhale Shamrocks	3-07	16	3	5.33
5	Kevin Cleere	Graigue-Ballycallan	1-13	16	2	8.00
5	John Maher	St. Martin's	1-13	16	2	8.00
6	David Buggy	Erin's Own	3-06	15	4	3.75
7	Paul Holden	Young Irelands	0-13	13	2	6.50
7	Mark Bergin	O'Loughlin Gaels	0-13	13	2	6.50
7	Colin Herity	Dunnamaggin	0-13	13	2	6.50

Top scorers in a single game

Rank	Player	Club	Tally	Total	Opposition
1	Shane Hennessy	Tullaroan	0-13	13	Young Irelands
2	Shane Hennessy	Tullaroan	1-08	11	Young Irelands
3	T. J. Reid	Ballyhale Shamrocks	2-04	10	O'Loughlin Gaels
3	Henry Shefflin	Ballyhale Shamrocks	1-07	10	Graigue-Ballycallan
3	Kevin Cleere	Graigue-Ballycallan	1-07	10	Ballyhale Shamrocks
4	Eoin Reid	Ballyhale Shamrocks	2-03	9	Graigue-Ballycallan
4	Martin Boran	Erin's Own	0-09	9	James Stephens
5	David Buggy	Erin's Own	2-02	8	Fenians
5	Richie Power	Carrickshock	1-05	8	St. Martin's
5	John Maher	St. Martin's	0-08	8	Carrickshock
5	John Maher	St. Martin's	0-08	8	James Stephens
