= Richie Reid (hurler, born 1993) =

Irish hurler (born 1993)

Personal information
- Native name: Risteard Ó Maoildeirg (Irish)
- Born: 4 April 1993 (age 33) Ballyhale, County Kilkenny, Ireland
- Occupation: Soldier
- Height: 6 ft 0 in (183 cm)

Sport
- Sport: Hurling
- Position: Centre back
Club
- Years: Club
- 2011-present: Ballyhale Shamrocks
Club titles
- Kilkenny titles: 3
- Leinster titles: 2
- All-Ireland Titles: 2
Inter-county*
Years	County	Apps (scores)
2014-present	Kilkenny	5 (0-02)
Inter-county titles
- Leinster titles: 7
- All-Irelands: 2
- NHL: 3
- All Stars: 0
- *Inter County team apps and scores correct as of 21:47, 17 July 2021.

Richard Reid (born 4 April 1993) is an Irish hurler who plays for Kilkenny Senior Championship club Ballyhale Shamrocks and at inter-county level with the Kilkenny senior hurling team. He usually lines out at midfield, and was nominated to become captain of the Kilkenny Senior hurlers for the 2022 season.

== Playing career ==
=== Ballyhale Shamrocks ===
Reid joined the Ballyhale Shamrocks club at a young age and played in all grades at juvenile and underage before eventually joining the club's top adult team in the senior grade.

On 23 October 2011, Reid lined out in goal when Ballyhale Shamrocks faced James Stephens in the championship final for the third time in five years. The game ended in an 0–11 to 1–08 draw. Reid was again selected in goal for the replay a week later but ended on the losing side following a 1–20 to 0–15 defeat.

Reid lined out in a second successive final on 11 November 2012. He maintained a clean sheet and secured his first winners' medal after a 0–16 to 0–12 defeat of Dicksboro.

On 16 November 2014, Reid lined out in goal in a third final when Ballyhale faced Clara. He ended the game with a second winners' medal following a 1–20 to 1–13 victory. On 7 December 2014, Reid won a Leinster Club Championship medal following a 0–21 to 1-14 extra-time defeat of Kilcormac/Killoughey in the final. On 17 March 2015, he lined out in goal when Ballyhale faced Kilmallock in the All-Ireland final. Reid ended the game with an All-Ireland medal after the 1–18 to 1–06 victory.

Reid played in a fourth final with Ballyhale Shamrocks on 30 October 2016. Lining out at right wing-back, he ended the game on the losing side after scoring 1–05 in the 0–19 to 1–12 defeat by O'Loughlin Gaels.

On 28 October 2018, Reid claimed his third winners' medal when Ballyhale Shamrocks defeated Bennettsbridge by 2–20 to 2–17 to win the Kilkenny Championship. He was again selected at left wing-back when Ballyhale faced Ballyboden St. Enda's in the Leinster final and ended the game with a second provincial winners' medal after the 2–21 to 0–11 victory. Reid was again selected at left wing-back when Ballyhale qualified for the All-Ireland final on 17 March 2019. He collected a second winners' medal following the 2–28 to 2–11 victory over St. Thomas's.

On 27 October 2019, Reid lined out at left wing-back when Ballyhale Shamrocks faced James Stephens in the Kilkenny Championship final. He claimed a fourth winners' medal after the 2–21 to 1–15 victory.

=== Kilkenny ===
==== Minor and under-21 ====
Reid first lined out for Kilkenny as a 16-year-old member of the minor team during the 2010 Leinster Championship. He made his first appearance for the team on 1 May 2010 when he came on as a substitute in a 2–13 to 0–09 defeat of Dublin. On 5 July 2010, Reid was an unused substitute when Kilkenny defeated Dublin by 1–20 to 0–10 to win the Leinster Championship. He was again listed amongst the substitutes when Kilkenny faced Clare in the All-Ireland final on 6 September 2010. Reid was introduced as a 56th-minute substitute for Paul Holden and collected a winners' medal following the 2–10 to 0–14 victory.

On 3 July 2011, Reid was selected at left corner-forward when Kilkenny faced Dublin in the Leinster final. He scored two points from play but ended the game on the losing side after a 1–14 to 1–11 defeat.

Reid progressed on to the Kilkenny under-21 team as sub-goalkeeper in advance of the 2012 Leinster Championship. On 11 July 2012, he won a Leinster Championship medal as a non-playing substitute after a 4–24 to 1–13 defeat of Laois in the final. Reid was again listed amongst the substitutes for the 2–17 to 2-11 All-Ireland final defeat by Clare on 15 September 2012.

On 11 July 2013, Reid was selected at centre-forward when Kilkenny qualified for a second successive Leinster final. He scored three points from play but ended the game on the losing side after a 1–21 to 0–21 defeat by Wexford.

==== Senior ====
Reid was drafted onto the Kilkenny senior team as third-choice goalkeeper during the 2014 season. On 4 May 2014, he was a member of the extended panel when Kilkenny defeated Tipperary by 2–25 to 1–27 to win the National League. On 6 July 2014, Reid was again a member of the extended panel when Kilkenny secured the Leinster Championship after a 0–24 to 1–09 defeat of Dublin in the final. On 27 September 2014, he claimed an All-Ireland medal as a member of the extended panel after Kilkenny's 2–17 to 2–14 defeat of Tipperary in the All-Ireland final replay.

Reid was promoted to second-choice goalkeeper during the 2015 season. He won a second successive Leinster Championship medal on 5 July 2015 as a non-playing substitute following Kilkenny's 1–25 to 2–15 defeat of Galway in the final. On 6 September 2015, Reid was listed amongst the substitutes for the All-Ireland final against Galway. He remained on the bench throughout the game but collected a second successive All-Ireland medal following the 1–22 to 1–18 victory.

On 6 March 2016, Reid made his first competitive appearance for Kilkenny when he lined out in goal in a 0–21 to 1–14 defeat of Galway in the National League. He was named on the substitutes' bench for a third successive Leinster final on 3 July 2016. Reid remained on the bench for the entire game but collected his third winners' medal following a 1–26 to 0–22 defeat of Galway. Reid was again named amongst the substitutes for the All-Ireland final against Tipperary on 4 September 2016. He ended the game on the losing side following the 2–29 to 2–20 defeat.

On 10 June 2017, Reid made his Leinster Championship debut when he was introduced as a 67th-minute substitute for Richie Hogan in a 1–20 to 3–11 defeat by Wexford at the semi-final stage.

On 8 April 2018, Reid won a second National League medal as a non-playing substitute after Kilkenny's 2–23 to 2–17 defeat of Tipperary in the National League final. He was again selected amongst the substitutes when Kilkenny faced Galway in the Leinster final on 1 July 2018. Reid remained on the bench for the 0-18 apiece draw. He was again listed as a substitute for the 1–28 to 3–15 defeat in the replay a week later.

On 30 June 2019, Reid was selected on the match-day panel when Kilkenny faced Wexford in the Leinster final. He remained on the bench for the 1–23 to 0–23 defeat. On 18 August 2019, Reid was again an unused substitute when Kilkenny suffered a 3–25 to 0–20 defeat by Tipperary in the All-Ireland final.

== Career statistics ==
As of match played 17 July 2021.

Team	Year	National League			Leinster		All-Ireland		Total	
Team	Year	Division	Apps	Score	Apps	Score	Apps	Score	Apps	Score
Kilkenny	2014	Division 1A	0	0-00	0	0-00	0	0-00	0	0-00
Kilkenny	2015	Division 1A	0	0-00	0	0-00	0	0-00	0	0-00
Kilkenny	2016	Division 1A	3	0-00	0	0-00	0	0-00	3	0-00
Kilkenny	2017	Division 1A	0	0-00	1	0-00	0	0-00	1	0-00
Kilkenny	2018	Division 1A	4	0-04	0	0-00	0	0-00	4	0-04
Kilkenny	2019	Division 1A	0	0-00	0	0-00	0	0-00	0	0-00
Kilkenny	2020	Division 1B	0	0-00	2	0-00	0	0-00	2	0-00
Kilkenny	2021	Division 1B	5	0-06	2	0-02	0	0-00	7	0-08
Total			12	0-10	5	0-02	0	0-00	17	0-12

== Honours ==
St. Kieran's College

- All-Ireland Colleges Senior Hurling Championship: 2010, 2011
- Leinster Colleges Senior Hurling Championship: 2010, 2011

Ballyhale Shamrocks

- All-Ireland Senior Club Hurling Championship: 2015, 2019, 2020
- Leinster Senior Club Hurling Championship: 2014, 2018, 2019
- Kilkenny Senior Hurling Championship: 2012, 2014, 2018, 2019, 2020

Kilkenny

- All-Ireland Senior Hurling Championship: 2014, 2015
- Leinster Senior Hurling Championship: 2014, 2015, 2016, 2020, 2021
- National Hurling League: 2014, 2018, 2021
- Leinster Under-21 Hurling Championship: 2012
- All-Ireland Minor Hurling Championship: 2010
- Leinster Minor Hurling Championship: 2010

Sporting positions
Preceded by Adrian Mullen	Kilkenny senior hurling team captain 2022	Succeeded by Eoin Cody
