= T. J. Reid =

Irish hurler (born 1987)

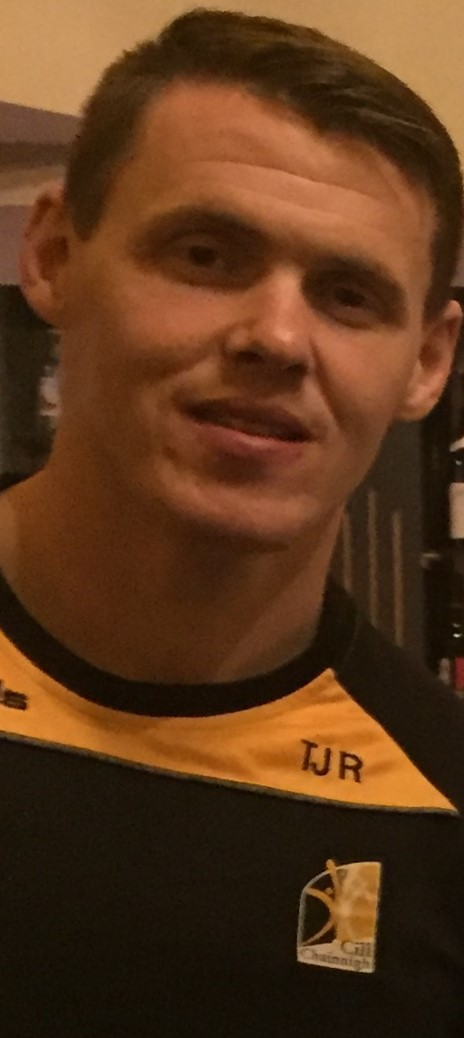

Personal information
- Native name: T. S. Ó Maoildeirg (Irish)
- Born: 16 November 1987 (age 38) Ballyhale, Kilkenny, Ireland
- Occupations: Owner at TJ Reid Health and Fitness
- Height: 6 ft 3 in (191 cm)

Sport
- Sport: Hurling
- Position: Centre-forward
Club*
Years	Club	Apps (scores)
2004–	Ballyhale Shamrocks	111 (38-671)
Club titles
- Kilkenny titles: 13
- Leinster titles: 8
- All-Ireland Titles: 6
College
- Years: College
- Waterford Institute of Technology
College titles
- Fitzgibbon titles: 1
Inter-county**
Years	County	Apps (scores)
2007–2026	Kilkenny	99 (43–672)
Inter-county titles
- Leinster titles: 14
- All-Irelands: 7
- NHL: 5
- All Stars: 7
- * club appearances and scores correct as of 21:40, 25 October 2026. **Inter County team apps and scores correct as of 11:26, 10 Jul 2025.

Thomas Joseph Reid (born 16 November 1987), known as T. J. Reid, is an Irish hurler who plays for Kilkenny Senior Championship club Ballyhale Shamrocks and formerly at inter-county level with the Kilkenny senior hurling team. He usually lines out as a centre-forward. He is widely regarded as one of the greatest hurlers of all time.

Reid began his hurling career at club level with Ballyhale Shamrocks. He broke onto the club's senior team as a 16-year-old goalkeeper in 2004 before later being deployed as an outfield player. Reid has since played on six All-Ireland Club Championship-winning teams, including as captain in 2015.

At inter-county level, Reid was part of the successful Kilkenny under-21 team that won All-Ireland Championships in 2006 and 2008. He joined the Kilkenny senior team in 2007. Since then Reid has gone on to establish himself as one of the most dominant forwards of his generation, even though he never captained Kilkennys golden generation to All Ireland glory, and remains the only Kilkenny captain to have lost two all Ireland finals to neighbours and arch rivals Tipperary. He has been involved in seven All-Ireland Championship-winning teams with Kilkenny while Reid has also claimed multiple Leinster Championship and National League. He is the highest scoring player in the history of the All-Ireland championship, with 43 goals 672 points, a total of 801 points as of 25 May 2026.

== Playing career ==
=== St Kieran's College ===
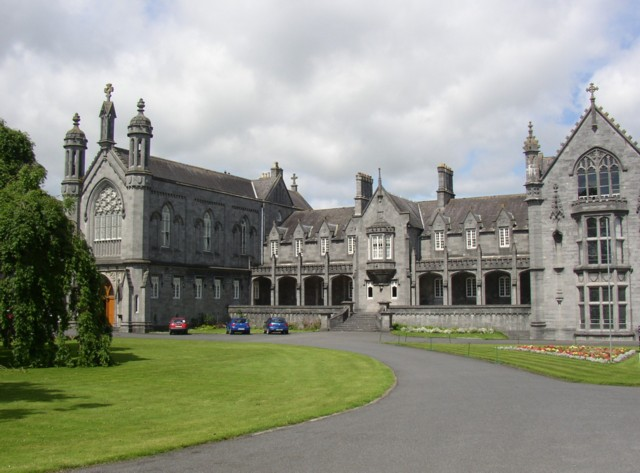
St Kieran's College

Reid first came to prominence as a hurler with St Kieran's College in Kilkenny. Having played in every grade as a hurler, he was eventually called up the college's senior team. On 13 March 2004, Reid was an unused substitute when St. Kieran's College defeated St Peter's College from Wexford by 0–13 to 1–04 to win the Leinster Championship. On 3 May 2004, he was an unused substitute once again when St Kieran's College claimed the All-Ireland Championship following a 3–20 to 1–06 defeat of St Raphael's College from Loughrea.

On 13 March 2005, Reid lined out at midfield when St Kieran's College faced St Brendan's Community School from Birr in the Leinster final. He scored a point from play and collected a second successive winners' medal - his first on the field of play - following a 1–18 to 1–12 victory. Reid was switched to left wing-forward for the All-Ireland final against St Flannan's College from Ennis on 2 May 2005. He scored two points from play but ended on the losing side following a 2–15 to 2–12 defeat.

=== Waterford Institute of Technology ===
As a student at the Waterford Institute of Technology, Reid immediately became involved in hurling and joined the senior team in his second year. On 1 March 2008, he lined out at centre-forward in the Fitzgibbon Cup final against the Limerick Institute of Technology. Reid scored three points from play and claimed a winners' medal following the 1–29 to 1-24 extra-time victory.

=== Ballyhale Shamrocks ===
==== Minor and under-21 ====
Reid joined the Ballyhale Shamrocks club at a young age and played in all grades at juvenile and underage levels. After enjoying little success in the minor grade he was just 15-year-old when he was drafted onto the club's under-21 team.

On 7 December 2003, Reid was selected amongst the substitutes when Ballyhale Shamrocks faced Tullaroan in the Kilkenny Under-21 Championship final. He remained on the bench for the entire game but collected a winners' medal following the 5–09 to 1–09 victory.

Reid was just 16-years-old when he broke onto the club's under-21 team during the 2004 championship. On 21 November 2004, he lined out at right corner-forward when Ballyhale Shamrocks faced Tullaroan in a second successive Kilkenny Under-21 Championship final. Reid was held scoreless throughout but claimed a second successive winners' medal following the 1–14 to 0–16 victory.

Ballyhale Shamrocks qualified for a third successive Kilkenny Under-21 Championship final on 4 December 2005. Reid claimed a third successive winners' medal - his second on the field of play - following a 5–16 to 2–04 defeat of Dicksboro.

On 10 December 2006, Reid was selected at centre-forward when Ballyhale Shamrocks reached a fourth successive Kilkenny Under-21 Championship final. He collected a fourth successive winners' medal after scoring five points from play in the 2–17 to 1–04 defeat of Erin's Own.

==== Senior ====
Reid was just 16-year-old when he joined the Ballyhale Shamrocks senior team in advance of the 2004 Kilkenny Senior Championship. He made his first appearance for the team on 2 October 2004 when he lined out in goal in a 0–15 to 1–12 draw with O'Loughlin Gaels.

Reid became an outfield player during the 2005 Kilkenny Senior Championship. On 23 October 2005, he lined out at midfield when Ballyhale Shamrocks faced James Stephens in the final. Reid top scored for the team with 1–02 in the 1–18 to 2–12 defeat.

On 5 November 2006, Reid lined out in his second successive final. Playing at left wing-forward, he scored three points from play and claimed his first winners' medal following a 1–22 to 2–11 defeat of O'Loughlin Gaels. On 26 November 2006, Reid won a Leinster Championship medal after scoring five points from play in Ballyhale's 1–20 to 1–08 defeat of Birr in the final. On 17 March 2007, he was selected at left wing-forward when Ballyhale Shamrocks faced Loughrea in the All-Ireland final. Reid top scored with 2-02 and claimed a winners' medal following the 3–12 to 2–08 victory.

Reid lined out in a third successive final on 28 October 2007. He top scored with 0–10 in the 1–20 to 1–10 defeat of St. Martin's. Reid ended the championship as the club's top scorer with 0-24.

On 26 October 2008, Reid was selected at left wing-forward when Ballyhale Shamrocks reached a fourth successive final. He scored two points from play and collected a third successive winners' medal after a 2–11 to 0–12 defeat of James Stephens. On 30 November 2008, Reid won a second Leinster Championship medal after scoring 1–01 in Ballyhale's 2–13 to 0–11 defeat of Birr in the final.

Reid was again selected at left wing-forward when Ballyhale Shamrocks faced James Stephens in a second consecutive final on 25 October 2009. He scored six points from play and collected a winners' medal as Ballyhale secured a record-equalling four-in-a-row following the 1–14 to 1–11 victory. On 29 November 2009, Reid won a third Leinster Championship medal following Ballyhale's 1–16 to 1–08 defeat of Tullamore in the final. He was again selected at left wing-forward when Ballyhale faced Portumna in the All-Ireland final on 17 March 2010. Reid scored three points from play and ended the game with a second All-Ireland medal following the 1–19 to 0–17 victory.

On 23 October 2011, Reid lined out at centre-forward when Ballyhale Shamrocks faced James Stephens in the final for the third time in five years. The game ended in an 0–11 to 1–08 draw. Reid was switched to left wing-forward for the replay a week later but ended on the losing side following a 1–20 to 0–15 defeat.

Reid was appointed captain of the Ballyhale Shamrocks team for the 2014 Kilkenny Senior Championship. On 16 November 2014, he captained the club to a final meeting with Clara. Reid top scored with ten points and collected a fifth winners' medal following the 1–20 to 1–13 victory. He claimed a fourth Leinster Championship medal on 7 December 2014 after again scoring ten points in a 0–21 to 1-14 extra-time defeat of Kilcormac/Killoughey in the final. On 17 March 2015, Reid captained Ballyhale Shamrocks to an All-Ireland final-meeting with Kilmallock. He ended the game with a third All-Ireland medal after a 1–18 to 1–06 victory.

Reid played in a seventh final with Ballyhale Shamrocks on 30 October 2016. Lining out at left wing-forward, he ended the game on the losing side after scoring 1–05 in the 0–19 to 1–12 defeat by O'Loughlin Gaels.

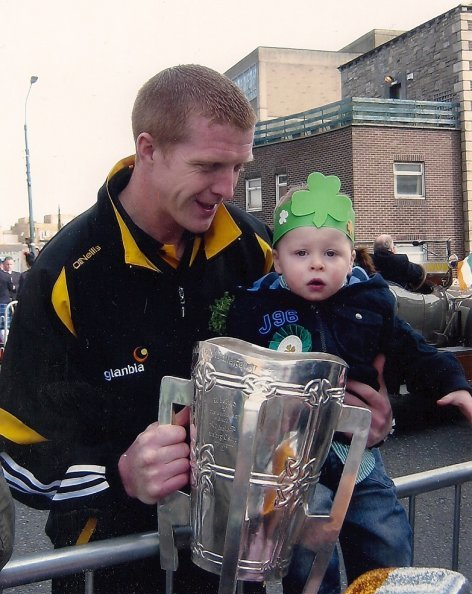
Henry Shefflin managed Reid to consecutive All-Ireland Club Championships in 2019 and 2020.

On 28 October 2018, Reid top scored with 1-10 and claimed his sixth winners' medal when Ballyhale Shamrocks defeated Bennettsbridge by 2–20 to 2–17 to win the Kilkenny Championship. He again top scored with nine points when Ballyhale faced Ballyboden St. Enda's in the Leinster final and ended the game with a fifth provincial winners' medal after the 2–21 to 0–11 victory. Reid was selected at centre-forward when Ballyhale qualified for the All-Ireland final on 17 March 2019. He collected a fourth winners' medal following the 2–28 to 2–11 victory over St. Thomas's. Reid was one of six Ballyhale Shamrocks hurlers later chosen on the Team of the Year.

On 27 October 2019, Reid lined out at centre-forward when Ballyhale Shamrocks faced James Stephens in the Kilkenny Championship final. He top scored for the team with six points, with all bar one coming from placed balls, and collected a seventh winners' medal after the 2–21 to 1–15 victory. Reid was also the championship's top scorer with 1-34. On 1 December 2019, he was selected at midfield but lined out at centre-forward when Ballyhale Shamrocks faced St. Mullin's in the Leinster final. Reid top scored for the team with nine points, including eight from placed balls, and collected a sixth winners' medal following the 1–21 to 0–15 victory. On 18 January 2020, Reid was selected at left wing-forward when Ballyhale Shamrocks faced Borris-Ileigh in the All-Ireland final. He top scored with 0-08, including five frees, and claimed a record fifth All-Ireland Club Championship medal after the 0–18 to 0–15 victory. Reid also ended the championship as top scorer with 2-53.

=== Kilkenny ===
==== Minor and under-21 ====
Reid first played for Kilkenny as a member of the minor team during the 2005 Leinster Championship. He made his only appearance in the grade on 25 June 2005 when he scored 1-01 from left wing-forward in a 2–16 to 4–07 defeat by Dublin.

Reid was still eligible for the minor grade when he was drafted onto the Kilkenny under-21 team for the 2005 Leinster Championship. On 20 July 2005, he was an unused substitute when Kilkenny defeated Dublin by 0–17 to 1–10 to win the Leinster Championship. Reid was again selected amongst the substitutes for the All-Ireland final against Galway on 18 September 2005. He remained on the bench for the 1–15 to 1–14 defeat.

Reid broke onto the Kilkenny under-21 starting fifteen during the 2006 Leinster Championship. On 27 July 2006, he won a second successive Leinster Championship medal - his first on the field of play - after scoring a point in the 2–18 to 2–10 defeat of Dublin in the final. On 10 September 2006, Reid scored two points from right wing-forward when Kilkenny drew 2-14 apiece with Tipperary in the All-Ireland final. He was switched to left wing-forward for the replay on 16 September 2006 and collected a winners' medal after being held scoreless in the 1–11 to 0–11 victory.

On 24 July 2008, Reid won a third Leinster Championship medal in four years after top scoring for Kilkenny with 1–03 in the 2–21 to 2–09 defeat of Offaly in the final. On 14 September 2008, he lined out at left wing-forward when Kilkenny faced Tipperary in the All-Ireland final. Reid claimed a second All-Ireland medal following the 2–13 to 0–15 defeat of Tipperary.

==== Senior ====
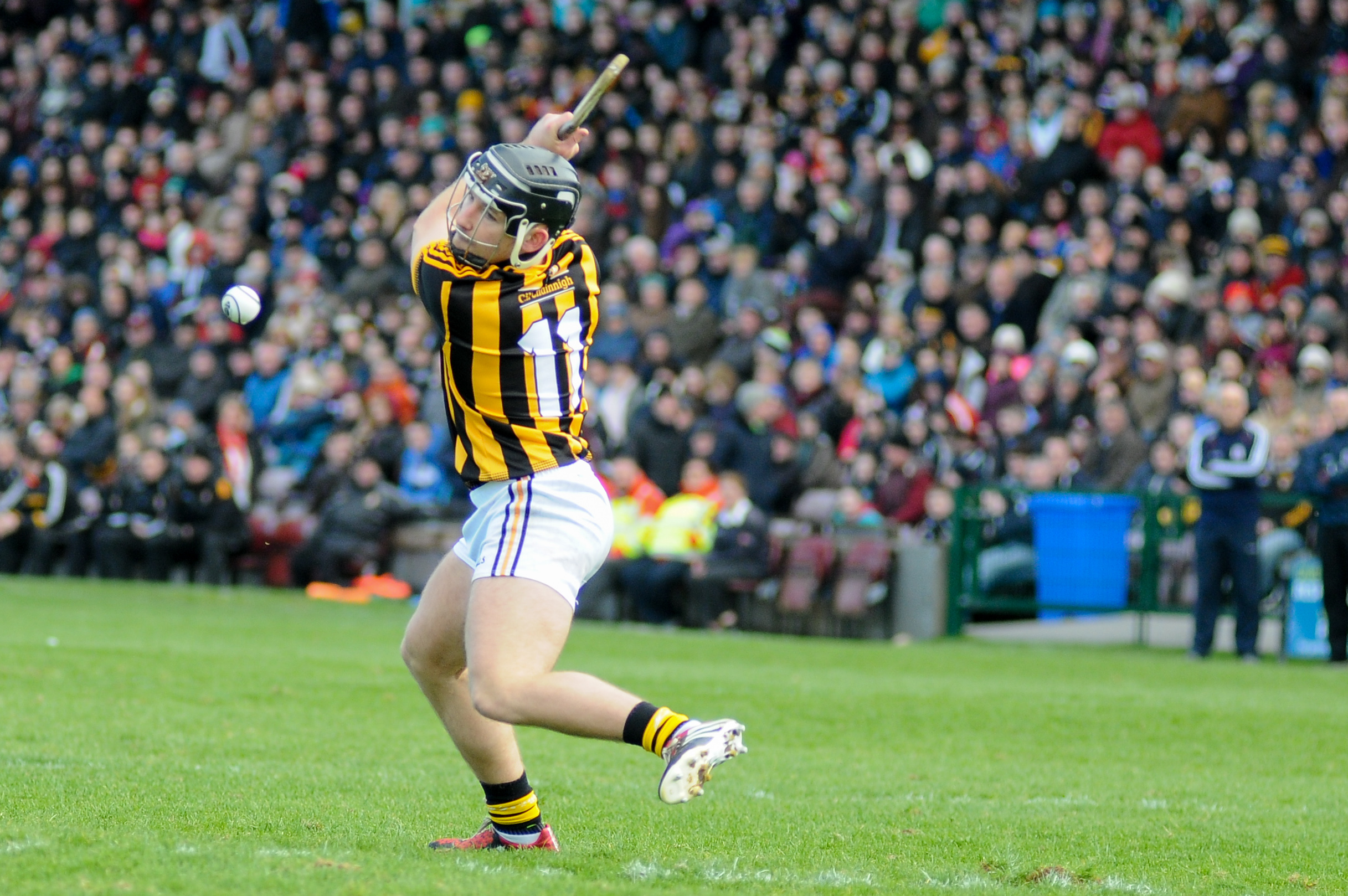
Reid made his championship debut as a substitute for Richie Hogan in 2008.

Reid was added to the extended training panel of the Kilkenny senior team at the start of the 2007 season. On 1 July 2007, he won a Leinster Championship medal as a panel member following Kilkenny's 2–24 to 1–12 defeat of Wexford in the final. Reid was again a member of the extended panel when Kilkenny faced Limerick in the All-Ireland final. He ended the game with a winners' medal following the 2–19 to 1–15 victory.

On 17 February 2008, Reid made his first appearance for the Kilkenny senior team when he lined out at left wing-forward in a 1–21 to 2–10 defeat of Dublin in the National League. He made his Leinster Championship debut on 15 June 2008 when he came on as a substitute for Richie Hogan at right corner-forward in a 2–24 to 0–12 defeat of Offaly. On 6 July 2008, Reid won his first Leinster Championship medal when he was an unused substitute for Kilkenny's 5–21 to 0–17 defeat of Wexford in the final. On 8 September 2008, he was again on the bench when Kilkenny faced Waterford in a first All-Ireland final since 1963. Reid was introduced as a substitute for Martin Comerford and claimed his second All-Ireland medal - his first on the field of play - after scoring four points from right win-forward in the 3–30 to 1–13 victory.

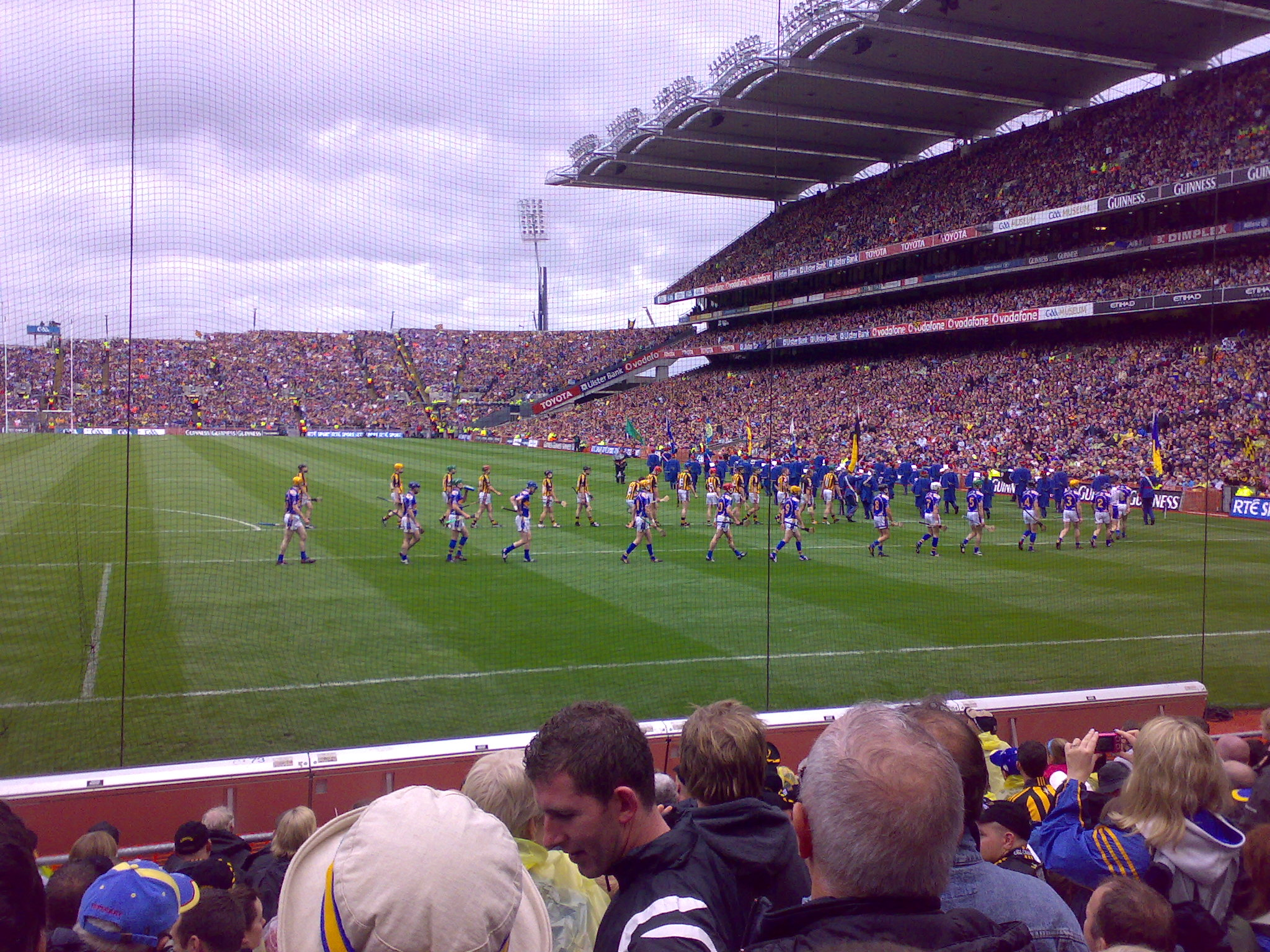
The Kilkenny and Tipperary teams parade before the 2009 All-Ireland final at Croke Park

Reid won his first National League medal on 3 May 2009 when he scored four points from full-forward in Kilkenny's 2–26 to 4-17 extra-time defeat of Tipperary in the final. On 5 July 2009, he was listed amongst the substitutes when Kilkenny faced Dublin in the Leinster final. Reid came on as a 51st-minute substitute for Richie Power and collected a third successive winners' medal following the 2–18 to 0–18 victory. On 6 September 2009, he failed to make the starting fifteen when Kilkenny faced Tipperary in the All-Ireland final. Reid was the first substitute to be called upon, coming on in the 50th minute for Aidan Fogarty, and collected a third successive All-Ireland medal as Kilkenny became only the second team ever to win four All-Ireland titles in-a-row following the 2–22 to 0–23 victory.

On 14 January 2010 Reid was appointed captain of the Kilkenny senior hurling team for the season. On 4 July 2010, he captained Kilkenny to the Leinster Championship title following a 1–19 to 1–12 defeat of Galway. On 5 September 2010, Reid captained the team from right wing-forward when Kilkenny faced Tipperary in the All-Ireland final. He scored four points from play but ended on the losing side after a 4–17 to 1–18 defeat.

On 1 May 2011, Reid scored five points from midfield when Kilkenny suffered a 0–22 to 1–07 defeat by Dublin in the National League final. On 3 July 2011, he won a fifth consecutive Leinster Championship medal in spite of being held scoreless in Kilkenny's 4–17 to 1–15 defeat of Dublin in the final. Reid was dropped from the starting fifteen for the All-Ireland final against Tipperary on 4 September 2011. In spite of this, he was the first substitute introduced and claimed a fourth All-Ireland medal after scoring a point in the 2–17 to 1–16 victory.

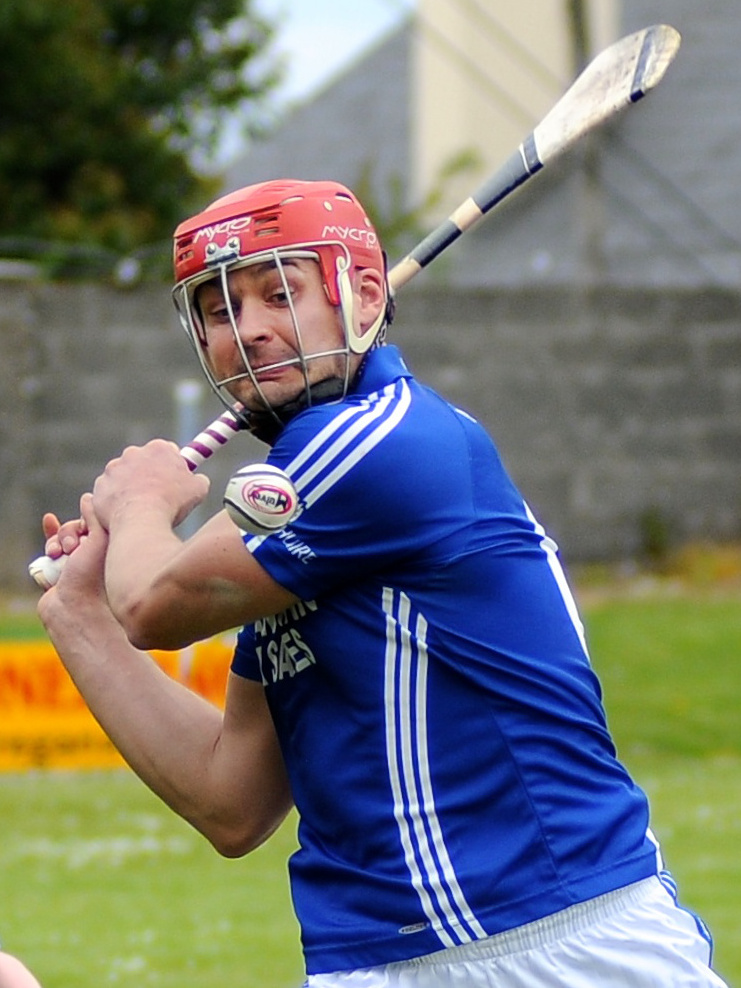
An off-the-ball clash with Iarla Tannian in the 2012 All-Ireland final replay resulted in a broken kneecap for Reid.

On 6 May 2012, Reid won a second National League medal after scoring 1-02 from play in Kilkenny's 3–21 to 0–16 defeat of Cork in the final. He was again at centre-forward but held scoreless on 8 July 2012 when Kilkenny suffered a 2–21 to 2–11 defeat by Galway in the Leinster final. On 9 September 2012, Reid scored two points from centre-forward when Kilkenny drew 2–13 to 0–19 with Galway in the All-Ireland final. He was switched to right corner-forward for the replay on 30 September 2012 and claimed a fifth All-Ireland medal following Kilkenny's 3–22 to 3–11 victory. The game was not without incident as Reid and Iarla Tannian had an off-the-ball clash resulting in a broken kneecap. He ended the season by being named on the All-Star team.

Reid's injury lay-off saw him miss Kilkenny's second successive National League triumph following a win over Tipperary in the final. He returned to the Kilkenny team in May 2013 after regaining some match fitness in a series of club games.

On 4 May 2014, Reid was selected at left wing-forward when Kilkenny faced Tipperary in a second successive National League final. He ended the game with a third winners' medal after top scoring with 2–11 in the 2–25 to 1–27 victory. On 6 July 2014, Reid won a sixth Leinster Championship medal after again top scoring with 0–10 in a 0–24 to 1–09 defeat of Dublin in the final. On 7 September 2014, he was again at left wing-forward and scored 1-08 when Kilkenny drew 3–22 to 1–28 with Tipperary in the All-Ireland final. He was switched to full-forward for the replay on 27 September 2014 and ended the game with a sixth All-Ireland medal following the 2–17 to 2–14 victory. Reid ended the season by being nominated for the GAA-GPA Hurler of the Year award before collecting a second All-Star award.

Reid won his seventh Leinster Championship medal on 5 July 2015 after top scoring with 1–09 in Kilkenny's 1–25 to 2–15 defeat of Galway in the final. On 6 September 2015, he was again at left wing-forward for the All-Ireland final against Galway. Reid ended the game with a seventh All-Ireland medal after scoring 1–07 in the 1–22 to 1–18 victory. He ended the season by claiming a third All-Star award as well as being named GAA-GPA Hurler of the Year.

Reid won an eighth Leinster Championship medal on 3 July 2016 after scoring 0–10 in Kilkenny's 1–26 to 0–22 defeat of Galway in the final. He was switched from full-forward to midfield for the All-Ireland final against Tipperary on 4 September 2016. Reid ended the game on the losing side after scoring 0–11 in the 2–29 to 2–20 defeat.

On 8 April 2018, Reid was at centre-forward when Kilkenny faced Tipperary in the National League final. He ended the game with a fifth winners' medal after top scoring for the team with 0–15 in the 2–23 to 2–17 victory. Reid was again the game's top scorer with 0-10 when Kilkenny drew 0-18 apiece with Galway in the Leinster final on 1 July 2018. He retained the position for the replay a week later and scored nine points in the 1–28 to 3–15 defeat.

Reid was appointed captain of the Kilkenny senior team for the second time in his career at the start of the 2019 season, however, his involvement with Ballyhale Shamrocks in the All-Ireland Club Championship ruled him out of the National League. On 30 June 2019, he captained the team from centre-forward when Kilkenny qualified to play Wexford in the Leinster final. Reid top scored with 0-12 but ended the game on the losing side following a 1–23 to 0–23 defeat. On 18 August 2019, Reid captained Kilkenny from centre-forward to an All-Ireland final appearance against Tipperary. He top scored with 0-11 - including ten frees - but again lost the final to Tipp for the second time as Kilkenny captain following a 3–25 to 0–20 defeat. Reid ended the year by receiving a fourth All-Star award while he was also shortlisted for the Hurler of the Year award.

Reid announced his retirement from the Kilkenny Senior Hurling team on 30 October 2026, 19 years after joining the senior panel.

=== Leinster ===
Reid won two Railway Cup medals with Leinster.

Reid was added to the Leinster team for the 2012 Inter-provincial Championship. He made his first appearance for the team on 4 March 2012 when he lined out at left corner-forward when Leinster faced Connacht in the Railway Cup final. Reid was held scoreless but ended the game with a winners' medal following a 2–19 to 1–15 victory.

On 1 March 2014, Reid was selected amongst the substitutes when Leinster faced Connacht in the Railway Cup final. He was introduced as a substitute for Walter Walsh and claimed a second winners' medal following the 1–23 to 0–16 victory.

Reid was a late replacement for Colin Fennelly at full-forward when Leinster faced Munster in the Railway Cup final on 15 December 2016. He top scored for the team with 1-06 but ended on the losing side following a 2–20 to 2–16 defeat.

== Personal life ==
Reid married Niamh De Brún at Adare Manor in 2021. He is a father. His daughter made her first TV appearance after a match on TG4 in 2024.

== Career statistics ==
=== Club ===
As of match played 25 October 2026.

Team	Season	Kilkenny		Leinster		All-Ireland		Total	
Team	Season	Apps	Score	Apps	Score	Apps	Score	Apps	Score
Ballyhale Shamrocks	2004-05	3	0-00	—		—		3	0-00
Ballyhale Shamrocks	2005-06	3	1-04	—		—		3	1-04
Ballyhale Shamrocks	2006-07	3	0-06	2	0-08	2	2-04	7	2-18
Ballyhale Shamrocks	2007-08	3	0-24	2	0-12	—		5	0-36
Ballyhale Shamrocks	2008-09	3	1-07	3	1-08	1	0-01	7	2-16
Ballyhale Shamrocks	2009-10	3	2-12	3	3-08	2	0-04	8	5-24
Ballyhale Shamrocks	2010-11	2	0-14	—		—		2	0-14
Ballyhale Shamrocks	2011-12	5	0-12	—		—		5	0-12
Ballyhale Shamrocks	2012-13	0	0-00	0	0-00	—		0	0-00
Ballyhale Shamrocks	2013-14	2	1-04	—		—		2	1-04
Ballyhale Shamrocks	2014-15	3	0-24	2	1-18	2	1-08	7	2-50
Ballyhale Shamrocks	2015-16	3	3-07	—		—		3	3-07
Ballyhale Shamrocks	2016-17	3	2-21	—		—		3	2-21
Ballyhale Shamrocks	2017-18	4	1-38	—		—		4	1-38
Ballyhale Shamrocks	2018-19	4	3-41	2	0-15	2	0-13	8	3-69
Ballyhale Shamrocks	2019-20	4	1-34	3	2-34	2	0-19	9	3-87
Ballyhale Shamrocks	2020-21	4	3-39	—		—		4	3-39
Ballyhale Shamrocks	2021-22	4	1-31	3	0-18	2	2-13	9	3-62
Ballyhale Shamrocks	2022-23	4	0-29	2	1-14	2	1-15	8	2-58
Ballyhale Shamrocks	2023-24	4	3-30	—		—		4	3-30
Ballyhale Shamrocks	2024-25	2	2-14	—		—		2	2-14
Ballyhale Shamrocks	2025-26	4	0-40	1	0-12	—		5	0-52
Ballyhale Shamrocks	2026-27	3	0-16	0	0-00	—		3	0-16
Total		73	24-447	23	8-147	15	6-77	111	38-671

=== Inter-county ===
==== Minor ====
Team	Year	Leinster		All-Ireland		Total	
Team	Year	Apps	Score	Apps	Score	Apps	Score
Kilkenny	2005	1	1-01	–		1	1-01
Total		1	1-01	0	0-00	1	1-01

==== Under-21 ====
Team	Year	Leinster		All-Ireland		Total	
Team	Year	Apps	Score	Apps	Score	Apps	Score
Kilkenny	2005	0	0-00	1	2-01	1	2-01
Kilkenny	2006	2	2-05	3	0-07	5	2-12
Kilkenny	2007	2	0-02	—		2	0-02
Kilkenny	2008	2	1-03	2	0-05	4	1-08
Total		6	3-10	6	2-13	12	5-23

==== Senior ====
As of match played 24 May 2026

Team	Year	National League			Leinster		All-Ireland		Total	
Team	Year	Division	Apps	Score	Apps	Score	Apps	Score	Apps	Score
Kilkenny	2007	Division 1	0	0-00	0	0-00	0	0-00	0	0-00
Kilkenny	2008	Division 1	4	0-02	1	0-01	2	0-06	7	0-09
Kilkenny	2009	Division 1	6	1-09	2	0-01	2	0-00	10	1-10
Kilkenny	2010	Division 1	3	1-17	2	0-05	2	0-05	7	1-27
Kilkenny	2011	Division 1	8	2-21	2	0-03	2	0-02	12	2-26
Kilkenny	2012	Division 1A	7	2-14	2	1-02	4	2-05	13	5-21
Kilkenny	2013	Division 1A	0	0-00	3	0-02	2	0-00	5	0-02
Kilkenny	2014	Division 1A	7	4-20	4	3-35	3	1-18	14	8-73
Kilkenny	2015	Division 1A	1	1-03	2	2-16	2	2-16	5	5-35
Kilkenny	2016	Division 1A	5	1-54	2	0-20	3	0-29	10	1-103
Kilkenny	2017	Division 1A	6	3-49	1	2-07	2	2-20	9	7-76
Kilkenny	2018	Division 1A	7	1-81	6	2-56	1	0-07	14	3-144
Kilkenny	2019	Division 1A	0	0-00	5	5-54	3	0-29	8	5-83
Kilkenny	2020	Division 1A	0	0-00	2	2-20	1	1-14	3	3-34
Kilkenny	2021	Division 1B	3	1-34	2	1-26	1	0-13	6	2-73
Kilkenny	2022	Division 1B	0	0-00	6	2-46	2	0-19	8	2-65
Kilkenny	2023	Division 1B	0	0-00	6	2-54	2	0-19	8	2-73
Kilkenny	2024	Division 1A	3	1-25	6	4-46	1	0-07	10	5-78
Kilkenny	2025	Division 1A	3	0-23	4	5-26	1	0-11	5	5-60
	2026	Division 1A	1	1-08	4	4-31	0		5	5-39
Career total			64	19-360	61	33-443	36	8-220	163	62-1031

=== Inter-provincial ===
Team	Year	Railway Cup	
Team	Year	Apps	Score
Leinster	2012	1	0-00
Leinster	2013	—	
Leinster	2014	1	0-00
Leinster	2015	—	
Leinster	2016	1	1-06
Career total		3	1-06

== Honours ==
=== Team ===
St Kieran's College

- All-Ireland Colleges Senior Hurling Championship (1): 2004
- Leinster Colleges Senior Hurling Championship (2): 2004, 2005

Waterford Institute of Technology

- Fitzgibbon Cup (1): 2008

Ballyhale Shamrocks

- All-Ireland Senior Club Hurling Championship (6): 2007, 2010, 2015 (c), 2019, 2020, 2023
- Leinster Senior Club Hurling Championship (8): 2006, 2008, 2009, 2014 (c), 2018, 2019, 2021, 2022
- Kilkenny Senior Hurling Championship (13): 2006, 2007, 2008, 2009, 2012 (sub), 2014 (c), 2018, 2019, 2020, 2021, 2022, 2025 (c), 2026
- Kilkenny Under-21 Hurling Championship (4): 2003, 2004, 2005, 2006

Kilkenny

- All-Ireland Senior Hurling Championship (7): 2007, 2008, 2009, 2011, 2012, 2014, 2015
- Leinster Senior Hurling Championship (14): 2007, 2008, 2009, 2010 (c), 2011, 2014, 2015, 2016, 2020, 2021, 2022, 2023, 2024, 2025
- National Hurling League (5): 2009, 2012, 2014, 2018, 2021
- All-Ireland Under-21 Hurling Championship (2): 2006, 2008
- Leinster Under-21 Hurling Championship (3): 2005, 2006, 2008

Leinster

- Railway Cup (2): 2012, 2014

=== Individual ===
Awards

- GAA-GPA All-Star Hurler of the Year (1): 2015
- The Sunday Game Player of the Year (1): 2015
- GAA-GPA All-Star Award (7): 2012, 2014, 2015, 2019, 2020, 2022, 2023
- GAA GPA All Stars Nominations (13): 2010, 2012, 2014, 2015, 2016, 2017, 2018, 2019, 2020, 2021, 2022, 2023, 2025
- All-Ireland Senior Hurling Championship Top Scorer (3): 2019, 2022, 2023
- Gaelic Writers’ Association Hurling Personality of the Year (1): 2022
- In May 2020, the Irish Independent named Reid at number eighteen in its "Top 20 hurlers in Ireland over the past 50 years".

== Miscellaneous ==
- T. J. Reid became the second player after clubmate Michael Fennelly, who has won the most All-Ireland winner's medals between club and county combined. In his collection he possesses sixteen All-Ireland medals: seven were won with the senior Kilkenny county team, six with his club Shamrocks Ballyhale, two with the Kilkenny under-21 hurling team and one with the St. Kierans College hurling team.
- Reid also made history after winning his sixth All-Ireland Senior Club Championship winners medal on 22 January 2023. This brought his overall major titles to 63 from minor, colleges, under 21, interprovincial and senior at club and intercounty level, passing out both Henry Shefflin and Christy Ring who both had accumulated 62 titles each.

Sporting positions
Preceded by Michael Fennelly	Kilkenny Senior Hurling Captain; 2010	Succeeded by Brian Hogan
Preceded by Cillian Buckley	Kilkenny Senior Hurling Captain; 2019	Succeeded by Colin Fennelly
Achievements
Preceded by Ollie Canning	All-Ireland Senior Club Hurling Final winning captain 2015	Succeeded by Cathal King
Awards
Preceded by Richie Hogan	GAA-GPA All-Star Hurler of the Year; 2015	Succeeded by Austin Gleeson
