= St Martin's GAA =

St Martin's GAA may refer to:

- St Martin's GAA (Kilkenny), a sports club in the Ballyfoyle/Coon/Muckalee area, Ireland
- St Martin's GAA (Wexford), a sports club in Murrintown, Ireland
- St Martin's GAA (Carlow), a sports club

== See also ==
- Naomh Máirtín CPG, a sports club in Monasterboice, County Louth
