= Shefflin =

Shefflin is a surname. Notable people with the surname include:

- Evan Shefflin (born 1999), Irish hurler
- Henry Shefflin (born 1979), Irish hurling manager and former player
- Paul Shefflin (1980–2022), Irish hurler
