= 2008 Kilkenny Senior Hurling Championship =

Annual hurling competition season

- Dates: 20 September 2008 – 26 October 2008
- Teams: 12
- Sponsor: St. Canice's Credit Union
- Champions: Ballyhale Shamrocks (12th title); Bob Aylward (captain); Maurice Aylward (manager)
- Runners-up: James Stephens; Jackie Tyrrell (captain); Páraic Fanning (manager)
- Relegated: Dicksboro

Tournament statistics
- Matches played: 12
- Goals scored: 25 (2.08 per match)
- Points scored: 313 (26.08 per match)
- Top scorer(s): Henry Shefflin (1-23)

The 2008 Kilkenny Senior Hurling Championship was the 114th staging of the Kilkenny Senior Hurling Championship since its establishment by the Kilkenny County Board in 1887. The championship began on 20 September 2008 and ended on 26 October 2008.

Ballyhale Shamrocks were the defending champions.

On 4 October 2008, Dicksboro were relegated from the championship following 2–11 to 1–11 defeat by Young Irelands.

On 26 October 2008, Ballyhale Shamrocks won the championship after a 2–11 to 0–12 defeat of James Stephens in the final. It was their 12th championship title overall and their third title in succession.

Henry Shefflin from the Ballyhale Shamrocks club was the championship's top scorer with 1-23.

== Team changes ==
=== To Championship ===
Promoted from the Kilkenny Intermediate Hurling Championship

- Clara

=== From Championship ===
Relegated to the Kilkenny Intermediate Hurling Championship

- Mullinavat

== Results ==
=== First round ===
20 September 2008 First round	Graigue-Ballycallan	0-18 - 1-10	Dicksboro	John Locke Park, Callan
16:00	D Byrne 0-4, N Millea 0-4, E Brennan 0-3, J Young 0-2, P Kennedy 0-2, J Hoyne 0-2, J Brennan 0-1.		S Maher 1-4, A Stapleton 0-3, E O'Donoghue 0-1, J Fagan 0-1, T Manning 0-1.	Referee: P Dunphy (Carrigeen)

20 September 2008 First round	Tullaroan	1-16 - 0-15	St. Martin's	St. Patrick's Park, Ballyragget
18:00	J Coogan 0-8, Michael Walsh 1-1, Martin Wlahs 0-3, S Hennessy 0-1, R Cleere 0-1, P Glennon 0-1, P Doheny 0-1.		John Maher 0-8, S Coonan 0-2, C McGrath 0-1, Joe Maher 0-1, J Mulhall 0-1, E McGrath 0-1, B Maher 0-1.	Referee: J Guinan (St. Lachtain's)

21 September 2008 First round	Fenians	2-12 - 2-10	Dunnamaggin	Nowlan Park, Kilkenny
13:00	K Reid 1-6, K Power 1-0, K Grehan 0-3, D Tobin 0-1, J Broderick 0-1, D Broderick 0-1.		S O'Neill 1-4, S Connery 1-0, C Herity 0-2, K Moore 0-2, D Fitzpatrick 0-1, N Lahart 0-1.	Referee: P Neary (James Stephens)

21 September 2008 First round	Clara	0-14 - 0-10	Young Irelands	Bennettsbridge Sportsfield, Bennettsbridge
13:00	K Hogan 0-7, Liam Ryan 0-2, N Prendergast 0-2, Lester Ryan 0-1, D Langton 0-1, B Phelan 0-1.		J Fitzgerald 0-3, P Kehoe 0-3, D Carter 0-2, C Carter 0-1, T Carroll 0-1.	Referee: G Rafter (Threecastles)

=== Relegation play-off ===
4 October 2008 Play-off	Young Irelands	2-11 - 1-11	Dicksboro	Thomastown Sportsfield, Thomastown
	C Carter 2-4, J Fitzgerald 0-2, M Carey 0-2, S Kehoe 0-2, O Carter 0-1.		S Maher 1-4, P O'Flynn 0-2, A Stapleton 0-2, E O'Donoghue 0-2, T Manning 0-1.	Referee: E Crowley (Mooncoin)

=== Quarter-finals ===
27 September 2008 Quarter-final	O'Loughlin Gaels	4-15 - 2-14	Tullaroan	Páirc Lachtain, Freshford
14:30	M Bergin 2-3, A Geoghegan 2-1, M Nolan 0-4, C Bergin 0-2, S Dowling 0-1, B Hogan 0-1, N McEvoy 0-1, B Dowling 0-1, M Kelly 0-1.		J Coogan 0-8, P Doheny 1-1, C Maher 1-1, S Hennessy 0-2, Martin Walsh 0-1, K Coogan 0-1.	Referee: E Mansfield

27 September 2008 Quarter-final	Ballyhale Shamrocks	3-19 - 0-10	Clara	Thomastown Sportsfield, Thomastown
16:30	H Shefflin 1-10, E Reid 1-3, B Costelloe 1-0, J Fitzpatrick 0-3, TJ Reid 0-2, D Hoyne 0-1.		D Langton 0-3, Liam Ryan 0-2, Lester Ryan 0-1, D Prendergast 0-1, C Phelan 0-1, J Nolan 0-1, K Hogan 0-1.	Referee: P Neary

28 September 2008 Quarter-final	James Stephens	1-17 - 1-10	Graigue Ballycallan	John Locke Park, Callan
14:00	D McCormack 0-6, D Cody 1-2, J Tyrrell 0-2, G Whelan 0-2, D Walton 0-2, E Larkin 0-2, M Ruth 0-1.		D Byrne 0-5, J Hoyne 1-0, E Brennan 0-3, N Millea 0-1, J Dunphy 0-1.	Referee: J Guinan

28 September 2008 Quarter-final	Carrickshock	0-14 - 1-07	Fenians	Nowlan Park, Kilkenny
16:00	R Power 0-5, M Rice 0-5, M Rohan 0-4.		K Reid 1-3, G Henderson 0-1, J Borderick 0-1, B Power 0-1, S Grehan 0-1.	Referee: E Crowley

=== Semi-finals ===
12 October 2008 Semi-final	James Stephens	1-12 - 0-13	O'Loughlin Gaels	Nowlan Park, Kilkenny
14:00	E Larkin 1-4, D McCormack 0-4, D Cody 0-1, R Hayes 0-1, G Whelan 0-1, M Phelan 0-1.	Report	M Nolan 0-8, M Bergin 0-3, A Geoghegan 0-2.	Referee: D Connolly

12 October 2008 Semi-final	Ballyhale Shamrocks	1-21 - 0-11	Carrickshock	Nowlan Park, Kilkenny
15:30	H Shefflin 0-10, TJ Reid 1-3, E Reid 0-4, C Fennelly 0-3, B Costelloe 0-1.	Report	R Power 0-8, S Power, M Rice and M O'Dwyer 0-1 each.	Referee: E Mansfield

=== Final ===
26 October 2008 Final	Ballyhale Shamrocks	2-11 - 0-12	James Stephens	Nowlan Park, Kilkenny
15:00	E Reid 1-2, P Reid 1-0, H Shefflin 0-3 (2f), T J Reid, J 'Cha' Fitzpatrick (1 sl) 0-2 each, D Hoyne, M Fennelly 0-1 each.	Report	E Larkin 0-4 (3f), D Walton, D Cody (1f 1 65) 0-2 each, M Ruth, P Larkin, G Whelan, D McCormack 0-1 each.	Referee: E Mansfield

== Championship statistics ==
=== Top scorers ===
Top scorers overall

Rank	Player	Club	Tally	Total	Matches	Average
1	Henry Shefflin	Ballyhale Shamrocks	1-23	26	3	8.66
2	Jimmy Coogan	Tullaroan	0-16	16	2	8.00
3	Kevin Reid	Fenians	2-09	15	2	7.50
3	Eoin Reid	Ballyhale Shamrocks	2-09	15	3	5.00
4	Shane Maher	Dicksboro	2-08	14	2	7.00
5	Eoin Larkin	James Stephens	1-10	13	3	4.33
5	Richie Power	Carrickshock	0-13	13	2	6.50
6	Mark Bergin	O'Loughlin Gaels	2-06	12	2	6.00
6	Maurice Nolan	O'Loughlin Gaels	0-12	12	2	6.00
7	Charlie Carter	Young Irelands	2-05	11	2	5.50
7	David McCormack	James Stephens	0-11	11	3	3.66

Top scorers in a single game

Rank	Player	Club	Tally	Total	Opposition
1	Henry Shefflin	Ballyhale Shamrocks	1-10	13	Clara
2	Charlie Carter	Young Irelands	2-04	10	Dicksboro
3	Mark Bergin	O'Loughlin Gaels	2-03	9	Tullaroan
3	Kevin Reid	Fenians	1-06	9	Dunnamaggin
4	Jimmy Coogan	Tullaroan	0-08	8	St. Martin's
4	John Maher	St. Martin's	0-08	8	Tullaroan
4	Jimmy Coogan	Tullaroan	0-08	8	O'Loughlin Gaels
4	Maurice Nolan	O'Loughlin Gaels	0-08	8	James Stephens
4	Richie Power	Carrickshock	0-08	8	Ballyhale Shamrocks
5	Shane Maher	Dicksboro	1-04	7	Graigue-Ballycallan
5	Seaghan O'Neill	Dunnamaggin	1-04	7	Fenians
5	Shane Maher	Dicksboro	1-04	7	Young Irelands
5	Eoin Larkin	James Stephens	1-04	7	O'Loughlin Gaels
5	Keith Hogan	Clara	0-07	7	Young Irelands
