= 2007 All-Ireland Senior Club Hurling Championship final =

2007 All-Ireland Senior Club Hurling Championship Final
- Event: 2006–07 All-Ireland Senior Club Hurling Championship
Ballyhale Shamrocks	Loughrea
3-12	2-8
- Date: 17 March 2007
- Venue: Croke Park, Dublin
- Man of the Match: Michael Fennelly
- Referee: Diarmuid Kirwan (Cork)
- Attendance: 25,285

The 2007 All-Ireland Senior Club Hurling Championship final was a hurling match played at Croke Park on 17 March 2007 to determine the winners of the 2006–07 All-Ireland Senior Club Hurling Championship, the 37th season of the All-Ireland Senior Club Hurling Championship, a tournament organised by the Gaelic Athletic Association for the champion clubs of the four provinces of Ireland. The final was contested by Ballyhale Shamrocks of Kilkenny and Loughrea of Galway, with Ballyhale Shamrocks winning by 3-12 to 2-8.

The All-Ireland final was a unique occasion as it was the first ever championship meeting between Ballyhale Shamrocks and Loughrea. It remains their only clash in the All-Ireland series. Ballyhale Shamrocks were hoping to win a record-breaking fifth All-Ireland title while Loughrea were appearing in their first decider.

Loughrea made a brilliant start to the game and they led by double-scores after ten minutes thanks to good work from Ken Colleran (0-2), John O'Loughlin and Johnny Maher. Ballyhale Shamrocks were quick to race into gear with five points on the trot with Michael Fennelly, T. J. Reid and Patrick Reid and Henry Shefflin all on target. These scores gave Ballyhale a 0-7 to 0-4 advantage by the 19th-minute and a great run from T. J. Reid from 45 metres out resulted in the game's first goal as he had no hesitation in crashing the ball to the back of the Loughrea net.

The Kilkenny and Leinster champions held a 1-9 to 0-7 lead at the interval and quickly built on this on the restart as full-forward Patrick Reid rifled the ball to the net. Henry Shefflin ensured that the gap was quickly extended to ten points. However, scores were suddenly at a premium and Loughrea were also keen on making a comeback. In the closing quarter, Loughrea owned possession but struggled to get scores on the board but they did manage two fine goals with Vinnie and Johnny Maher both crashing to the net. Ballyhale were also goal-hungry and T. J. Reid found the net in the 64th minute to seal a memorable 3-12 to 2-8 victory.

Ballyhale's All-Ireland victory was their first since 1990. The win gave them their fifth All-Ireland title over all and put them as outright leaders on the all-time roll of honour.

== Match ==
=== Details ===
17 March 2007

Ballyhale Shamrocks	3-12 - 2-8	Loughrea
TJ Reid 2-2; P. Reid 1-2; E. Reid 0-3; H. Shefflin 0-3 (all frees); M. Fennelly, M. Aylward, 0-1 each.		J. Maher 1-3 (1-1 frees, 0-1 65); V. Maher 1-0; K. Colleran 0-2; J. O’Loughlin 0-2; B. Dooley 0-1.

Croke Park, Dublin
Referee: D Kirwan (Cork)

Ballyhale Shamrocks	Loughrea
