= 2019 Kilkenny Senior Hurling Championship =

Annual hurling competition season

- Dates: 21 September 2019 – 27 October 2019
- Teams: 12
- Sponsor: St. Canice's Credit Union
- Champions: Ballyhale Shamrocks (17th title); Michael Fennelly (captain); Henry Shefflin (manager)
- Runners-up: James Stephens; Conor Browne (captain); Séamus Plunkett (manager)
- Relegated: St. Patrick's Ballyragget

Tournament statistics
- Matches played: 14
- Goals scored: 34 (2.43 per match)
- Points scored: 426 (30.43 per match)
- Top scorer(s): T. J. Reid (1-34)

The 2019 Kilkenny Senior Hurling Championship was the 125th staging of the Kilkenny Senior Hurling Championship since its establishment by the Kilkenny County Board in 1887. The championship began on 21 September 2019 and ended on 27 October 2019.

Ballyhale Shamrocks were the defending champions.

On 27 October 2019, Ballyhale Shamrocks won the championship after a 2–21 to 1–15 defeat of James Stephens in the final at UPMC Nowlan Park. It was their 17th championship overall and their second title in succession.

T. J. Reid from the Ballyhale Shamrocks club was the championship's top scorer with 1-34.

== Team changes ==
=== To Championship ===
Promoted from the Kilkenny Intermediate Hurling Championship

- Graigue-Ballycallan

=== From Championship ===
Relegated to the Kilkenny Intermediate Hurling Championship

- Carrickshock

== Results ==
=== First round ===
21 September 2019 First round	Danesfort	0-15 - 4-19	James Stephens	St. John's Park, Kilkenny
	P Hogan 0-8, C O'Neill 0-2, P Mullen 0-2, J Bruton 0-1, P Hickey 0-1, D Dunphy Wallace 0-1.		T O'Dwyer 2-1, E Guilfoyle 0-7, L Scanlon 1-3, C Browne 1-2, N Brassil 0-2, M Ruth 0-2, S Donohoe 0-1, D Walton 0-1.	Referee: O Kenny (Tullogher-Rosbercon)

21 September 2019 First round	Erin's Own	3-18 - 2-09	Bennettsbridge	Clara Sportsfield, Clara
	M Murphy (1-6, goal penalty, one point free) C Fogarty (1-5, three points frees); J Holohan (1-1); M Boran (0-3); C Delaney, S Feehan, D Dunne (0-1 each).		L Blanchfield (1-1); J Cleere (1-1, goal penalty); N Cleere (0-4, three frees); H O’Neill (0-2); D Wafer (0-1).	Referee: S Cleere

22 September 2019 First round	Graigue-Ballycallan	1-10 - 0-13	Mullinavat	John Locke Park, Callan
	C Murphy 0-5, C Hoyne 1-1, B Ryan 0-4.		J Walsh 0-7, G Malone 0-3, M Malone 0-1, R Malone 0-1, D Kenneally 0-1.	Referee: J Gahan

22 September 2019 First round	St. Patrick's Ballyragget	2-16 - 5-27	Ballyhale Shamrocks	Páirc Shéamuis Stíophán, Kilkenny
	S Kenny (1-5); J Brennan (1-4); M Brennan (0-3); B Staunton, S Staunton (0-2 each).		E Cody (1-9); A Mullen (2-1); E Reid (1-2); B Cody (0-4); C Fennelly (1-0); R Corcoran, TJ Reid, J Cuddihy (0-3 each); D Mullen, M Aylward (0-1 each).	Referee: P Burke

29 September 2019 First round replay	Graigue-Ballycallan	1-13 - 1-18	Mullinavat	John Locke Park, Callan
	C Murphy (0-9); S Ryan (1-3); B Ryan (0-1).	Report	J Walsh (0-11); W O’Dwyer (0-3); M Malone (1-0); M Mansfield (0-2); I Duggan, J Gahan (0-1 each).

=== Relegation play-off ===
6 October 2019 Play-off	Bennettsbridge	1-23 - 1-16	St. Patrick's Ballyragget	Clara Sportsfield, Clara
	N Cleere (0-16, 0-13 frees, 0-1 65); J Cleere (1-0, pen); C Brennan (0-3); K Blanchfield, L Blanchfield, H O'Neill, D Walsh (0-1 each).	Report	K Kelly (1-8, 1-7 frees); G Brennan, M Brennan (0-2 each); B Staunton, B Staunton, S Kenny, J Morrissey (0-1 each).

=== Quarter-finals ===
5 October 2019 Quarter-final	O'Loughlin Gaels	0-12 - 0-12	Mullinavat	Nowlan Park, Kilkenny
	M Bergin (0-10); R Buckley, C Heary (0-1 each).	Report	J Walsh (0-5); W O’Dwyer, A Mansfield (0-2 each); M Malone, I Duggan, J Gahan (0-1 each).

5 October 2019 Quarter-final	Dicksboro	1-06 - 1-08	Erin's Own	Nowlan Park, Kilkenny
	S Stapleton (0-4); B Sheehan (1-0); O Walsh, A Nolan (0-1 each).	Report	M Murphy, J Mullins (0-4 each), C Fogarty (1-0).

6 October 2019 Quarter-final	Rower-Inistioge	0-15 - 0-19	James Stephens	Thoamstown Sportsfield, Thomastown
	D Kelly (0-9); R Leahy (0-2); S Ryan, S Lyster, D Lyng, M Galavan (0-1 each).		E Guilfoyle (0-6); N Brassil (0-5); L Scanlon (0-3); C Browne, C Kenny (0-2 each); T O’Dwyer (0-1).

12 October 2019 Quarter-final replay	O'Loughlin Gaels	1-14 - 0-13	Mullinavat	Bennettsbridge Sportsfield, Bennettsbridge
	M Bergin (0-9); D Loughnane (1-1); E O’Shea, R Buckley, M Butler, C Loy (0-1 each).	Report	J Walsh (0-3); W O’Dwyer, I Duggan (0-2 each); T Aylward, M Malone, P Dempsey, G Malone, J Gahan, A Mansfield (0-1 each).

13 October 2019 Quarter-final	Clara	0-17 - 1-19	Ballyhale Shamrocks	Danesfort Sportsfield, Danesfort
	J Bergin (0-6); L Rhan (0-4); C Bolger, D Langton (0-3 each); C O’Shea (0-1).	Report	TJ Reid (1-14); A Mullen (0-2); B Cody, R Corcoran, E Cody (0-1 each).

=== Semi-finals ===
13 October 2019 Semi-final	Erin's Own	2-09 - 1-15	James Stephens	Nowlan Park, Kilkenny
	M Murphy (2-7); S Feehan, D Dunne (0-1 each).	Report	E Guilfoyle (0-5); L Scanlon (1-1); N Brassil, T O’Dwyer, D Walton, C Browne (0-2 each); N Mullins (0-1).

20 October 2019 Semi-final	O'Loughlin Gaels	1-14 - 2-20	Ballyhale Shamrocks	UPMC Nowlan Park, Kilkenny
	M Bergin (0-11); D Loughnane (1-0); L Hogan, R Buckley, M Comerford (0-1 each).	Report	TJ Reid (0-11); A Mullen (1-4); E Cody (1-0); E Shefflin, R Corcoran, P Mullen, E Reid, J Cuddihy (0-1 each).

=== Final ===
27 October 2019 Final	James Stephens	1-15 - 2-21	Ballyhale Shamrocks	UPMC Nowlan Park, Kilkenny
	E Guilfoyle (0-8, frees); T O’Dwyer (1-1); N Brassil (1 free, 0-3); C Kenny, C Browne, S Donohoe (0-1 each).	Report	E Cody (1-2); TJ Reid (0-6, 4 frees, 1 65); A Mullen, C Fennelly (0-3 each), B Cody (1-0); E Reid, R Corcoran, E Shefflin (0-2 each); J Cuddihy (0-1).

== Championship statistics ==
=== Top scorers ===
Overall

Rank	Player	Club	Tally	Total	Matches	Average
1	T. J. Reid	Ballyhale Shamrocks	1-34	37	4	9.25
2	Mark Bergin	O'Loughlin Gaels	0-30	30	3	10.00
3	Michael Murphy	Erin's Own	3-17	26	3	8.66
3	Johnny Walsh	Mullinavat	0-26	26	4	6.50
3	Eoin Guilfoyle	James Stephens	0-26	26	4	6.50
4	Eoin Cody	Ballyhale Shamrocks	3-12	21	4	5.25
5	Nicky Cleere	Bennettsbridge	0-20	20	2	10.00
6	Adrian Mullen	Ballyhale Shamrocks	3-10	19	4	4.75
7	Tadhg O'Dwyer	James Stephens	3-05	14	4	3.50
7	Conor Murphy	Graigue-Ballycallan	0-14	14	2	7.00

Top scorers in a single game

Rank	Player	Club	Tally	Total	Opposition
1	T. J. Reid	Ballyhale Shamrocks	1-14	17	Clara
2	Nicky Cleere	Bennettsbridge	0-16	16	St. Patrick's Ballyragget
3	Michael Murphy	Erin's Own	2-07	13	James Stephens
4	Eoin Cody	Ballyhale Shamrocks	1-09	12	St. Patrick's Ballyragget
5	Kevin Kelly	St. Patrick's Ballyragget	1-08	11	Bennettsbridge
5	Johnny Walsh	Mullinavat	0-11	11	Graigue-Ballycallan
5	T. J. Reid	Ballyhale Shamrocks	0-11	11	O'Loughlin Gaels
5	Mark Bergin	O'Loughlin Gaels	0-11	11	Ballyhale Shamrocks
6	Mark Bergin	O'Loughlin Gaels	0-10	10	Mullinavat
7	Michael Murphy	Erin's Own	1-06	9	Bennettsbridge
7	David Kelly	Rower-Inistioge	0-09	9	James Stephens
7	Conor Murphy	Graigue-Ballycallan	0-09	9	Mullinavat
7	Mark Bergin	O'Loughlin Gaels	0-09	9	Mullinavat
