= 2007 Kilkenny Senior Hurling Championship =

Annual hurling competition season

- Dates: 15 September 2007 – 28 October 2007
- Teams: 12
- Sponsor: St. Canice's Credit Union
- Champions: Ballyhale Shamrocks (12th title); Patrick Reid (captain); Maurice Aylward (manager)
- Runners-up: St. Martin's; Niall Moran (captain); Christy Walsh (manager)
- Relegated: Mullinavat

Tournament statistics
- Matches played: 15
- Goals scored: 30 (2 per match)
- Points scored: 383 (25.53 per match)
- Top scorer(s): Kevin Power (1-29)

The 2007 Kilkenny Senior Hurling Championship was the 113th staging of the Kilkenny Senior Hurling Championship since its establishment by the Kilkenny County Board in 1887. The championship began on 15 September 2007 and ended on 28 October 2007.

Ballyhale Shamrocks were the defending champions.

On 6 October 2007, Mullinavat were relegated from the championship following 1–11 to 0–13 defeat by Young Irelands.

On 28 October 2007, Ballyhale Shamrocks won the championship after a 1–20 to 1–10 defeat of St. Martin's in the final. It was their 11th championship title overall and their second title in succession.

Kevin Power from the Fenians club was the championship's top scorer with 1-29.

== Team changes ==
=== To Championship ===
Promoted from the Kilkenny Intermediate Hurling Championship

- Mullinavat

=== From Championship ===
Relegated to the Kilkenny Intermediate Hurling Championship

- Erin's Own

== Results ==
=== First round ===
| 15 September 2007 First round | Fenians | 2-11 - 0-13 | Tullaroan | Páirc Lachtáin, Freshford |
| 15:30 | K Power 1-6, PJ Ryan 1-0, PJ Delaney 0-1, B Power 0-1, J Broderick 0-1, S Grehan 0-1, B Ryan 0-1. | | J Coogan 0-7, T Walsh 0-3, S Maher 0-2, P Doherty 0-1. | Referee: J Guinan (St. Lachtain's) |

| 15 September 2007 First round | Dicksboro | 0-12 - 0-06 | Young Irelands | Bennettsbridge Sportsfield, Bennettsbridge |
| 17:30 | E O'Donoghue 0-6, C O'Loughlin 0-3, P O'Flynn 0-2, A STapleton 0-1. | | DJ Carey 0-2, C Carter 0-2, D Carroll 0-1, S Byrne 0-1. | Referee: D Connolly (Mooncoin) |

| 16 September 2007 First round | Carrickshock | 0-10 - 1-06 | O'Loughlin Gaels | John Locke Park, Callan |
| 12:00 | D Franks 0-5, J Power 0-2, M Rice 0-1, R Power 0-1, N Rohan 0-1. | | A Comerford 1-0, M Comerford 0-3, M Nolan 0-2, M Bergin 0-1. | Referee: E Crowley (Mooncoin) |

| 16 September 2007 First round | Dunnamaggin | 2-06 - 0-12 | Mullinavat | Páirc Seamróg, Ballyhale |
| 13:00 | JP O'Neill 1-0, K Moore 1-0, S O'Neill 0-3, R Cahill 0-2, C Herity 0-1. | | M MUrphy 0-6, W O'Dwyer 0-3, D Butler 0-2, P Raftice 0-1. | Referee: J Bennett (Tullogher-Rosbercon) |

| 23 September 2007 First round replay | Dunnamaggin | 0-23 - 0-14 | Mullinavat | Páirc Seamróg, Ballyhale |
| 17:00 | C Herity 0-8, S O'Neill 0-7, K Moore 0-3, D Fitzpatrick 0-2, D Herity 0-1, JP O'Neill 0-1, JJ Dunphy 0-1. | | M Murphy 0-8, W O'Dwyer 0-3, C Conway 0-1, J Fennelly 0-1, P Raftice 0-1. | Referee: P Neary (James Stephens) |

=== Relegation play-off ===
| 6 October 2007 Play-off | Young Irelands | 1-11- 0-13 | Mullinavat | Nowlan Park, Kilkenny |
| 15:30 | DJ Carey 0-6, C Carter 1-2, T Drennan 0-2, D Carroll 0-1. | | M Murphy 0-7, N Anthony 0-3, P Raftice 0-1, D Butler 0-1, W O'Dwyer 0-1. | Referee: E Mansfield (Cloneen) |

=== Quarter-finals ===
| 29 September 2007 Quarter-final | Graigue-Ballycallan | 2-13 - 2-13 | Fenians | Páirc Lachtáin, Freshford |
| 15:00 | E Brennan 1-2, M Hoyne 0-5, G Cleere 1-1, JJ Brennan 0-2, D Byrne 0-1, C Hoyne 0-1, A Burke 0-1. | | K Power 0-7, J Whelan 1-1, S Grehan 1-1, P Quinlan 0-1, B Ryan 0-1, B Power 0-1, K Grehan 0-1. | Referee: D Connolly (Mooncoin) |

| 29 September 2007 Quarter-final | Ballyhale Shamrocks | 0-18 - 1-10 | Dunnamaggin | Hugginstown Sportsfield, Carrickshock |
| 15:00 | TJ Reid 0-5, M Fennelly 0-4, J Fitzpatrick 0-4, E Fitzpatrick 0-2, E Reid 0-1, P Reid 0-1, D Hoyne 0-1. | | C Herity 0-6, K Moore 1-0, S O'Neill 0-2, JJ Dunphy 0-1, N Lahart 0-1. | Referee: G O'Grady (Erin's Own) |

| 30 September 2007 Quarter-final | James Stephens | 2-14 - 4-06 | Dicksboro | Nowlan Park, Kilkenny |
| 14:00 | E Larkin 1-9, D McCormack 1-0, P O'Brien 0-1, J Tyrrell 0-1, R Hayes 0-1, G Whelan 0-1, D Walton 0-1. | | E O'Donoghue 1-4, C Breathnach 1-0, A Stapleton 1-0, S Maher 1-0, D O'Neill 0-1, P O'Flynn 0-1. | Referee: J Ryan (St. Martin's) |

| 30 September 2007 Quarter-final | St. Martin's | 1-20 - 2-11 | Carrickshock | Nowlan Park, Kilkenny |
| 15:30 | John Maher 0-10, T Breen 1-1, J Mulhall 0-3, P Maher 0-2, Joe Maher 0-2, S Coonan 0-1, E McGrath 0-1. | | P Barron 2-0, D Franks 0-4, M Rice 0-3, S Power 0-1, N Rohan 0-1, J Power 0-1, J Butler 0-1. | Referee: J Bennett (Tullogher-Rosbercon) |

| 6 October 2007 Quarter-final replay | Graigue-Ballycallan | 0-10 - 1-12 | Fenians | Páirc Lachtáin, Freshford |
| 15:30 | M Hoyne 0-6, D Byrne 0-1, J Ryall 0-1, J Hoyne 0-1, C Hoyne 0-1. | | K Power 0-4, D Broderick 1-0, S Grehan 0-1, B Ryan 0-1, K Grehan 0-1, J Broderick 0-1, B Power 0-1, P Quinlan 0-1, J Whelan 0-1, PJ Delaney 0-1. | Referee: P Neary (James Stephens) |

=== Semi-finals ===
| 14 October 2007 Semi-final | St. Martin's | 1-11 - 0-14 | Fenians | Nowlan Park, Kilkenny |
| 14:00 | B Mulhall 1-1, J Mulhall 0-3, S Coonan 0-2, E McGrath 0-2, John Maher 0-2, P Maher 0-1. | | K Power 0-7, K Grehan 0-2, J Broderick 0-2, P Quinlan 0-2, L Ryan 0-1. | Referee: D O'Sullivan (John Lockes) |

| 14 October 2007 Semi-final | Ballyhale Shamrocks | 0-17 - 0-13 | James Stephens | Nowlan Park, Kilkenny |
| 15:30 | TJ Reid 0-9, E Reid 0-3, B Costelloe 0-2, M Fennelly 0-1, E Fitzpatrick 0-1, M Aylward 0-1. | | E Larkin 0-6, M Ruth 0-2, D Walton 0-2, J Tyrrell 0-1, E McCormack 0-1, G Whelan 0-1. | Referee: D Connolly (James Stephens) |

| 21 October 2007 Semi-final replay | St. Martin's | 3-16 - 3-08 | Fenians | Nowlan Park, Kilkenny |
| 16:00 | John Maher 1-6, B Mulhall 1-1, T Breen 1-1, S Coonan 0-3, P Maher 0-2, J Mulhall 0-1, E McGrath 0-1, D Maher 0-1. | | L Ryan 2-0, K Power 0-5, K Grehan 1-0, D Broderick 0-2, J Ryan 0-1. | Referee: P Dunphy (Carrigeen) |

=== Final ===
| 28 October 2007 Final | Ballyhale Shamrocks | 1-20 - 1-10 | St. Martin's | Nowlan Park, Kilkenny |
| 15:00 | TJ Reid 0-10 (5f, 1 '65'), E Reid 1-2, P Reid 0-4, C Fennelly 0-3, E Fitzpatrick 0-1. | Report | J Maher 0-8 (8f), E McGrath 1-2. | Referee: D Connolly |

== Championship statistics ==
=== Top scorers ===
Top scorers overall

| Rank | Player | Club | Tally | Total | Matches | Average |
|---|---|---|---|---|---|---|
| 1 | Kevin Power | Fenians | 1-29 | 32 | 5 | 6.40 |
| 2 | T. J. Reid | Ballyhale Shamrocks | 0-24 | 24 | 3 | 8.00 |
| 3 | John Maher | St. Martin's | 1-18 | 21 | 3 | 7.00 |
| 3 | Michael Murphy | Mullinavat | 0-21 | 21 | 3 | 7.00 |
| 4 | Eoin Larkin | James Stephens | 1-15 | 18 | 2 | 9.00 |
| 5 | Colin Herity | Dunnamaggin | 0-15 | 15 | 3 | 5.00 |
| 6 | Eddie O'Donoghue | Dicksboro | 1-10 | 13 | 2 | 6.50 |
| 7 | Seán O'Neill | Dunnamaggin | 0-12 | 12 | 3 | 4.00 |
| 8 | Michael Hoyne | Fenians | 0-11 | 11 | 5 | 2.20 |
| 9 | Kenneth Moore | Dunnamaggin | 2-03 | 9 | 3 | 3.00 |
| 9 | Eoin Reid | Ballyhale Shamrocks | 1-06 | 9 | 3 | 3.00 |
| 9 | Eoin McGrath | St. Martin's | 1-06 | 9 | 4 | 2.25 |
| 9 | David Franks | Carrickshock | 0-09 | 9 | 2 | 4.50 |

Top scorers in a single game

| Rank | Player | Club | Tally | Total | Opposition |
|---|---|---|---|---|---|
| 1 | Eoin Larkin | James Stephens | 1-09 | 12 | Dicksboro |
| 2 | T. J. Reid | Ballyhale Shamrocks | 0-10 | 10 | St. Martin's |
| 2 | John Maher | St. Martin's | 0-10 | 10 | Carrickshock |
| 3 | Kevin Power | Fenians | 1-06 | 9 | Tullaroan |
| 3 | John Maher | St. Martin's | 1-06 | 9 | Fenians |
| 3 | T. J. Reid | Ballyhale Shamrocks | 0-09 | 9 | James Stephens |
| 4 | Colin Herity | Dunnamaggin | 0-08 | 8 | Mullinavat |
| 4 | Michael Murphy | Mullinavat | 0-08 | 8 | Dunnamaggin |
| 4 | John Maher | St. Martin's | 0-08 | 8 | Ballyhale Shamrocks |
| 5 | Jimmy Coogan | Tullaroan | 0-07 | 7 | Fenians |
| 5 | Seán O'Neill | Dunnamaggin | 0-07 | 7 | Mullinavat |
| 5 | Kevin Power | Fenians | 0-07 | 7 | St. Martin's |
| 5 | Michael Murphy | Mullinavat | 0-07 | 7 | Young Irelands |
| 5 | Kevin Power | Fenians | 0-07 | 7 | Graigue-Ballycallan |
