= 2018 Kilkenny Senior Hurling Championship =

Annual hurling competition season

- Dates: 22 September 2018 – 28 October 2018
- Teams: 12
- Sponsor: St. Canice's Credit Union
- Champions: Ballyhale Shamrocks (16th title); Michael Fennelly (captain); Henry Shefflin (manager)
- Runners-up: Bennettsbridge; James McGrath (manager)
- Relegated: Carrickshock

Tournament statistics
- Matches played: 14
- Goals scored: 33 (2.36 per match)
- Points scored: 432 (30.86 per match)
- Top scorer(s): T. J. Reid (2-31)

The 2018 Kilkenny Senior Hurling Championship was the 124th staging of the Kilkenny Senior Hurling Championship since its establishment by the Kilkenny County Board in 1887. The championship began on 22 September 2018 and ended on 28 October 2018.

Dicksboro were the defending champions, however, they were defeated by Ballyhale Shamrocks at the quarter-final stage.

On 28 October 2018, Ballyhale Shamrocks won the championship after a 2–20 to 2–17 defeat of Bennettsbridge at Nowlan Park. It was their 16th championship title overall and their first title since 2014.

== Team changes ==
=== To Championship ===
Promoted from the Kilkenny Intermediate Hurling Championship

- St. Patrick's

=== From Championship ===
Relegated to the Kilkenny Intermediate Hurling Championship

- St. Martin's

== Results ==
=== First round ===
22 September 2018 First round	Erin's Own	2-15 - 1-18	Carrickshock	Clara
	S Buggy 1-1, J Holohan 1-1, C Fogarty 0-4, A Moran 0-2, J Mullins 0-2, D Dunne 0-2, N McMahon 0-1, S Daly 0-1, M Murphy 0-1.		K Farrell 0-6, J Power 1-2, E Martin 0-4, M O'Dwyer 0-3, B O'Donovan 0-1, M Rice 0-1, D Brennan 0-1.	Referee: P Burke (Emeralds)/E Larkin (James Stephens)

23 September 2018 First round	Clara	3-10 - 1-14	Danesfort	Páirc Shéamuis Stiopháin, Kilkenny
	J Nolan 2-1, C Bolger 1-3, J Bergin 0-5, L Ryan 0-1.		R Hogan 0-9, J Bruton 1-1, C Treacy 0-1, P Cooney 0-1, G Tynan 0-1, P Mullen 0-1.	Referee: M O'Sullivan (Ballyhale Shamrocks)

23 September 2018 First round	Mullinavat	2-14 - 0-16	Rower-Instioge	Thomastown Sportsfield, Thomastown
	J Walsh 1-6, O Knox 1-3, I Duggan 0-2, A Mansfield 0-2, W O'Dwyer 0-1.		K Murphy 0-7, R Leahy 0-2, K Joyce 0-1, T Murphy 0-1, S Lyster 0-1, S Ryan 0-1, C Ryan 0-1, J Ryan 0-1, P Lyng 0-1.	Referee: S Cleere (O'Loughlin Gaels)

23 September 2018 First round	Ballyhale Shamrocks	3-22 - 1-12	St. Patrick's	St. John's Park, Kilkenny
	TJ Reid 1-11, C Fennelly 1-1, A Mullen 0-4, E Cody 1-0, E Shefflin 0-3, R Reid 0-1, E Reid 0-1, B Cody 0-1.		K Kelly 1-9, B Staunton 0-1, S Kenny 0-1, G Brennan 0-1.	Referee: O Kenny (Tullogher-Rosbercon)

29 September 2018 First round replay	Erin's Own	1-13 - 0-14	Carrickshock	Clara
	M Murphy 0-9, D Dunne 1-1, C Fogarty 0-2, S Daly 0-1.		K Farrell 0-7, E Martin 0-3, M Rice 0-2, J Power 0-2.	Referee: R Dowling (Kilmacow)

=== Relegation play-off ===
13 October 2018 Final	Carrickshock	2-09 - 0-19	Danesfort	John Locke Park, Callan
	K Farrell 0-6, J Power 1-0, B O'Donovan 1-0, D Walsh 0-2, É Martin 0-1.		R Hogan 0-9, J Mullally 0-3, P Hogan 0-2, G Tynan 0-2, G Bruton 0-2, D O'Neill 0-1.	Referee: R Byrne (Glenmore)

=== Quarter-finals ===
30 September 2018 Quarter-final	O'Loughlin Gaels	0-16 - 2-12	Clara	Danesfort
	M Bergin 0-9, P Deegan 0-3, J Molloy 0-2, S Mahony 0-1, M Kelly 0-1.		J Bergin 0-10, J Nolan 1-1, J Murphy 1-0, L Ryan 0-2.	Referee: A Barcoe (Blacks and Whites)

30 September 2018 Quarter-final	Bennettsbridge	1-17 - 2-08	Mullinavat	Thomastown
	A Cleere 1-6, N Cleere 0-5, L Blanchfield 0-2, D Walsh 0-1, K Blanchfield 0-1, B Lannon 0-1, D Coyne 0-1.		J Walsh 0-8, J Fennelly 1-0, J Culleton 1-0.	Referee: S Cleere (O'Loughlin Gaels)

30 September 2018 Quarter-final	Dicksboro	1-19 - 1-24	Ballyhale Shamrocks	John Locke Park, Callan
	S Stapleton 0-7, A Gaffney 1-1, M Gaffney 0-3, B Sheehan 0-3, A Nolan 0-1, O Walsh 0-1, E Gough 0-1, K Kenny 0-1, R Murphy 0-1.		TJ Reid 1-15, A Mullen 0-4, E Reid 0-2, E Cody 0-2, M Aylward 0-1.	Referee: P Cahill (Dunnamaggin)

6 October 2018 Quarter-final	James Stephens	0-14 - 0-14	Erin's Own	Ballyragget
	D Walton (0-9, 0-8 frees), L Scanlon, E Larkin (0-2 each), N Brassil (0-1).		M Murphy (0-7, 0-6 frees), C Fogarty (0-3, 0-2 frees, 0-1 '65') N McMahon, J Holohan (0-2 each).

13 October 2018 Quarter-final replay	James Stephens	1-13 - 1-15	Erin's Own	Ballyragget
	D Walton 1-8, M Ruth 0-3, L Scanlon 0-1, N Brassil 0-1.		M Murphy 0-9, C Fogarty 1-0, E Brennan 0-3, C Delaney 0-1, A Moran 0-1, S Daly 0-1.	Referee: G Rafter

=== Semi-finals ===
14 October 2018 Semi-final	Bennettsbridge	3-19 - 2-17	Clara	Nowlan Park, Kilkenny
	S Morrissey (2-5); N Cleere (0-7); B Lannon (1-0); A Cleere (0-3); L Blanchfield (0-2); D Blanchfield, E Morrisseey (0-1 each).	Report	J Bergin (0-7); C Bolger (0-6); J Murphy (1-2); J Nolan (1-0); Liam Ryan (0-2).

21 October 2018 Semi-final	Ballyhale Shamrocks	1-16 - 1-15	Erin's Own	Nowlan Park, Kilkenny
	TJ Reid 0-5, E Shefflin 1-1, A Mullen 0-2, E Corcoran 0-2, E Cody 0-2, R Reid 0-1, E Reid 0-1, C Fennelly 0-1, M Aylward 0-1.		M Murphy 0-9, A Owens 1-0, C Fogarty 0-3, E Brennan 0-2, C Delaney 0-1.

=== Final ===
28 October 2018 Final	Bennettsbridge	2-17 - 2-20	Ballyhale Shamrocks	Nowlan Park, Kilkenny
	B Lannon (2-1); N Cleere (0-7 frees): E Morrissey, J Cleere and A Cleere (all 0-2); R Lennon, L Blanchfield and S Morrissey (all 0-1).	Report	TJ Reid (1-10, 0-8 frees); E Cody (1-1); B Cody (0-2); E Shefflin, D Mullen, R Corcoran, E Reid, C Fennelly, A Mullen and M Aylward (all 0-1).	Referee: P Cahill (Dunnamaggin)

== Championship statistics ==
=== Top scorers ===
Top scorers overall

Rank	Player	Club	Tally	Total	Matches	Average
1	T. J. Reid	Ballyhale Shamrocks	3-41	50	4	12.50
2	Michael Murphy	Erin's Own	0-35	35	5	7.00
3	James Bergin	Clara	0-22	22	3	7.33
4	David Walton	James Stephens	1-17	20	2	10.00
5	Nicky Cleere	Bennettsbridge	0-19	19	3	6.33
6	Kevin Farrell	Carrickshock	0-19	19	3	6.33
7	Richie Hogan	Danesfort	0-18	18	2	9.00
8	John Walsh	Mullinavat	1-14	17	2	8.50
9	Conor Fogarty	Erin's Own	1-12	15	5	3.00
10	James Nolan	Clara	4-02	14	3	4.66
10	Aidan Cleere	Bennettsbridge	1-11	14	3	4.66

Top scorers in a single game

Rank	Player	Club	Tally	Total	Opposition
1	T. J. Reid	Ballyhale Shamrocks	1-15	18	Dicksboro
2	T. J. Reid	Ballyhale Shamrocks	1-11	14	St. Patrick's
3	T. J. Reid	Ballyhale Shamrocks	1-10	13	Bennettsbridge
4	Kevin Kelly	St. Patrick's	1-09	12	Ballyhale Shamrocks
5	Seán Morrissey	Bennettsbridge	2-05	11	Clara
5	David Walton	James Stephens	1-08	11	Erin's Own
6	James Bergin	Clara	0-10	10	O'Loughlin Gaels
7	John Walsh	Mullinavat	1-06	9	Rower-Inistioge
7	Aidan Cleere	Bennettsbridge	1-06	9	Mullinavat
7	David Walton	James Stephens	0-09	9	Erin's Own
7	Mark Bergin	O'Loughlin Gaels	0-09	9	Clara
7	Richie Hogan	Danesfort	0-09	9	Clara
7	Michael Murphy	Erin's Own	0-09	9	Clara
7	Richie Hogan	Danesfort	0-09	9	Carrickshock
7	Michael Murphy	Erin's Own	0-09	9	James Stephens
7	Michael Murphy	Erin's Own	0-09	9	Ballyhale Shamrocks

=== Miscellaneous ===
- Bennettsbridge qualified for the final for the first time since 1974.
