= Dermot Lawlor =

Irish hurler

Personal information
- Born: 21 August 1972 (age 54) Muckalee, County Kilkenny, Ireland
- Occupation: Bank official
- Height: 5 ft 8 in (173 cm)

Sport
- Sport: Hurling
- Position: Left corner-forward
Club
- Years: Club
- St Martin's
Club titles
- Kilkenny titles: 0
Inter-county
Years	County	Apps (scores)
1992-1995	Kilkenny	2 (0-3)
Inter-county titles
- Leinster titles: 2
- All-Irelands: 2
- NHL: 1
- All Stars: 0

Dermot Lawlor (born 21 August 1972) is an Irish former hurler who played as a left corner-forward for the Kilkenny senior team.

Lawlor joined the team during the 1992 championship and was a regular member of the team for just two seasons. His inter county career was cut short due to a number of serious knee injuries. An All-Ireland medalist in the minor grade, he won two All-Ireland winners' medals as a non-playing substitute.

At club level Lawlor played with St Martin's.

Kilkenny Hurler of the Year in 1990.
