= 2012 Kilkenny Senior Hurling Championship =

Annual hurling competition season

- Dates: 13 October 2012 – 11 November 2012
- Teams: 12
- Sponsor: St. Canice's Credit Union
- Champions: Ballyhale Shamrocks (14th title); David Hoyne (captain); Tommy Shefflin (manager)
- Runners-up: Dicksboro; David Glynn (captain); Ger Henderson (manager)
- Relegated: Dunnamaggin

Tournament statistics
- Matches played: 12
- Goals scored: 26 (2.17 per match)
- Points scored: 329 (27.42 per match)
- Top scorer(s): Martin Gaffney (1-33)

The 2012 Kilkenny Senior Hurling Championship was the 118th staging of the Kilkenny Senior Hurling Championship since its establishment by the Kilkenny County Board in 1887. The championship began on 13 October 2012 and ended on 11 November 2012.

James Stephens were the defending champions, however, they were defeated in the semi-final. Dunnamaggin were relegated from the championship. Ballyhale Shamrocks won the championship following a 0–16 to 0–12 defeat of Dicksboro in the final.

== Team changes ==
=== To Championship ===
Promoted from the Kilkenny Intermediate Hurling Championship

- Danesfort

=== From Championship ===
Relegated to the Kilkenny Intermediate Hurling Championship

- Clara

== Results ==
=== First round ===
13 October 2012 First round	Danesfort	0-10 - 0-13	Graigue-Ballycallan	Nowlan Park
14:00	R Hogan 0-5, P Hogan 0-1, R Walsh 0-1, O Daly 0-1, B O'Connor 0-1, P Murphy 0-1.		N Millea 0-7, E Brennan 0-2, W O'Connor 0-1, D Heafey 0-1, J Purcell 0-1, D Walton 0-1.	Referee: M Flynn

13 October 2012 First round	Fenians	1-10 - 1-14	Erin's Own	Freshford
16:00	C Tobin 0-4, W Brennan 1-0, PJ Ryan 0-2, P Quinlan 0-1, PJ Delaney 0-1, K Grehan 0-1, JJ Delaney 0-1.		M Boran 1-4, A Owens 0-4, D Fogarty 0-3, C Fogarty 0-2, P Boran 0-1.	Referee: D Connolly

14 October 2012 First round	Dicksboro	2-15 - 0-12	Dunnamaggin	Thomastown
13:30	M Gaffney 1-10, K Kenny 1-1, P O'Flynn 0-3, C Buckley 0-1.		K Moore 0-5, C Hickey 0-2, S O'Neill 0-2, W Phelan 0-1, D Fitzpatrick 0-1, N Lahert 0-1.	Referee: G Quilty

14 October 2012 First round	Tullaroan	1-14 - 3-18	O'Loughlin Gaels	Tom Ryall Park
15:30	J Coogan 0-9, M Simpson 1-0, P Walsh 0-3, T Walsh 0-1, M Walsh 0-1.		M Bergin 1-11, C Bergin 1-1, M Comerford 0-4, D Burke 1-0, N McEvoy 0-1, N Skehan 0-1.	Referee: E Ryan

=== Relegation play-off ===
27 October 2012 Play-off	Danesfort	0-11 - 1-07	Dunnamaggin	Hugginstown
	R Hogan 0-8, P Forristal 0-1, P Hogan 0-1, R Walsh 0-1.		K Moore 0-6, A Fitzpatrick 1-0, C Herity 0-1.	Referee: E Mansfield

=== Quarter-finals ===
20 October 2012 Quarter-final	St. Martin's	0-19 - 3-15	Dicksboro	Nowlan Park
14:00	J Maher 0-9, J Mulhall 0-5, P Maher 0-1, T Breen 0-1, R Shore 0-1, J Maher 0-1, C McGrath 0-1.		S Maher 2-2, M Gaffney 0-7, K Kenny 1-0, C Buckley 0-3, J Fagan 0-1, Ollie Walsh 0-1, P O'Flynn 0-1.	Referee: P Burke

20 October 2012 Quarter-final	Ballyhale Shamrocks	3-16 - 1-16	Erin's Own	Nowlan Park
15:30	H Shefflin 0-7, J Fitzpatrick 1-1, M Fennelly 1-1, C Walsh 1-0, E Walsh 0-2, C Fennelly 0-2, E Reid 0-2, M Aylward 0-1.		M Boran 0-7, A Owens 1-2, D Fogarty 0-4, P Boran 0-2, D Dunne 0-1.	Referee: G Quilty

21 October 2012 Quarter-final	James Stephens	4-12 - 0-15	Graigue-Ballycallan	Freshford
13:45	E Larkin 1-8, N Mullins 2-0, G Flood 1-0, D McCormack 0-1, R Hayes 0-1, M Ruth 0-1, J McGrath 0-1.		N Millea 0-9, E Brennan 0-3, A Burke 0-2, J Purcell 0-1.	Referee: E Mansfield

21 October 2012 Quarter-final	Carrickshock	1-11 - 1-15	O'Loughlin Gaels	Páirc na Seamróg
16:00	R Power 0-8, goal og, J Power 0-2, N Rohan 0-1.		M Comerford 0-5, M Bergin 0-5, D Loughnane 1-0, M Kelly 0-2, S Murphy 0-1, N Bergin 0-1, N McEvoy 0-1.	Referee: E Crowley

=== Semi-finals ===
28 October 2012 Semi-final	O'Loughlin Gaels	2-10 - 1-17	Ballyhale Shamrocks	Nowlan Park
	M Bergin 1-7, D Loughnane 1-1, B Hogan 0-1, M Kelly 0-1.		C Fennelly 1-4, H Shefflin 0-7, E Reid 0-2, B Aylward 0-1, E Walsh 0-1, J Fitzpatrick 0-1, M Aylward 0-1.	Referee: J Walsh

28 October 2012 Semi-final	James Stephens	0-16 - 1-15	Dicksboro	Nowlan Park
	E Larkin 0-11, Donnacha Cody 0-1, N Tyrrell 0-1, G Flood 0-1, Diarmuid Cody 0-1, M Ruth 0-1.		M Gaffney 0-8, Ollie Walsh 1-0, P O'Flynn 0-2, J Fagan 0-1, Oisín Walsh 0-1, S Maher 0-1, K Kenny 0-1, D Ryan 0-1.	Referee: G Quilty

=== Final ===
11 November 2012 Final	Ballyhale Shamrocks	0-16 - 0-12	Dicksboro	Nowlan Park
	H Shefflin 0-5 (5f), M Aylward 0-3, E Reid, C Fennelly 0-2 each, R Aylward (f), J Fitzpatrick, M Fennelly, C Walsh 0-1 each.	Report	M Gaffney 0-8 (8f), Oisin Walsh, Ollie Walsh, E O'Donoghue, P O'Flynn 0-1 each.	Referee: G Quilty (Slieverue)

== Championship statistics ==
=== Top scorers ===
Top scorers overall

Rank	Player	Club	Tally	Total	Matches	Average
1	Martin Gaffney	Dicksboro	1-33	36	4	9.00
2	Mark Bergin	O'Loughlin Gaels	2-23	29	3	9.66
3	Eoin Larkin	James Stephens	1-19	22	2	11.00
4	Henry Shefflin	Ballyhale Shamrocks	0-19	19	3	6.33
5	Niall Millea	Graigue-Ballycallan	0-16	16	2	8.00
6	Martin Boran	Erin's Own	1-11	14	2	7.00
7	Richie Hogan	Danesfort	0-13	13	2	6.50
8	Colin Fennelly	Ballyhale Shamrocks	1-08	11	3	3.66
9	Shane Maher	Dicksboro	2-03	9	2	4.50
9	Anthony Owens	Erin's Own	1-06	9	2	4.50
9	Martin Comerford	O'Loughlin Gaels	0-09	9	2	4.50
9	Jimmy Coogan	Tullaroan	0-09	9	1	9.00

Top scorers in a single game

Rank	Player	Club	Tally	Total	Opposition
1	Mark Bergin	O'Loughlin Gaels	1-11	14	Tullaroan
2	Martin Gaffney	Dicksboro	1-10	13	Dunnamaggin
3	Eoin Larkin	James Stephens	1-08	11	Graigue-Ballycallan
3	Eoin Larkin	James Stephens	0-11	11	Dicksboro
4	Mark Bergin	O'Loughlin Gaels	1-07	10	Ballyhale Shamrocks
5	Jimmy Coogan	Tullaroan	0-09	9	O'Loughlin Gaels
5	John Maher	St. Martin's	0-09	9	Dicksboro
5	Niall Millea	Graigue-Ballycallan	0-09	9	James Stephens
6	Shane Maher	Dicksboro	2-02	8	St. Martin's
6	Richie Hogan	Danesfort	0-08	8	Dunnamaggin
6	Richie Power	Carrickshock	0-08	8	O'Loughlin Gaels
6	Martin Gaffney	Dicksboro	0-08	8	James Stephens
6	Martin Gaffney	Dicksboro	0-08	8	Ballyhale Shamrocks
