= 2014 Kilkenny Senior Hurling Championship =

Annual hurling competition season

- Dates: 11 October 2014 – 16 November 2014
- Teams: 12
- Sponsor: St. Canice's Credit Union
- Champions: Ballyhale Shamrocks (15th title); T. J. Reid (captain); Colm Bonnar (manager)
- Runners-up: Clara; Seán O'Shea (captain); Michael Purcell (manager)
- Relegated: Tullaroan

Tournament statistics
- Matches played: 14
- Goals scored: 31 (2.21 per match)
- Points scored: 403 (28.79 per match)

The 2014 Kilkenny Senior Hurling Championship was the 120th staging of the Kilkenny Senior Hurling Championship since its establishment in by the Kilkenny County Board in 1887. The championship began on 11 October 2014 and ended on 16 November 2014.

Clara were the defending champions. Tullaroan were relegated from the championship. Ballyhale Shamrocks won the championship following a 1–20 to 1–13 defeat of Clara.

== Team changes ==
=== To Championship ===
Promoted from the Kilkenny Intermediate Hurling Championship

- Graigue-Ballycallan

=== From Championship ===
Relegated to the Kilkenny Intermediate Hurling Championship

- Rower-Inistioge

== Results ==
=== First round ===
11 October 2014 First round	Carrickshock	3-14 - 0-19	Erin's Own	Tom Ryall Park, Ballycallan
16:00	R Power 1-8, John Power 2-1, Jamie Power 0-2, B Donovan 0-1, D Franks 0-1, K Farrell 0-1.		M Boran 0-14, D Dunne 0-2, E Brennan 0-1, R Moran 0-1, C Fogarty 0-1.	Referee: G Quilty

12 October 2014 First round	St. Martin's	0-13 - 0-10	Fenians	Páirc Lachtain, Freshford
14:00	J Maher 0-7, J Dowling 0-2, P Maher 0-2, T Breen 0-1, S Kinsella 0-1.		J Broderick 0-5, K Crehan 0-2, C Tobin 0-1, D Wislon 0-1, D Dermody 0-1.	Referee: S Cleere

12 October 2014 First round	Danesfort	2-14 - 1-17	Tullaroan	John Locke Park
14:00	R Hogan 1-6, P Hogan 1-2, R Walsh 0-2, P Murphy 0-2, K Treacy 0-1, J Phelan 0-1.		P Buggy 1-2, Mark Walsh 0-5, Martin Walsh 0-4, T Walsh 0-3, P Walsh 0-2, P Walshe 0-1.	Referee: R Dowling

12 October 2014 First round	Clara	1-20 - 0-18	James Stephens, Kilkenny	Polo Grounds, Jenkinstown
16:00	C Phelan 0-12, K Hogan 1-2, L Ryan 0-2, A Murphy 0-2, J Nolan 0-1, C Bolger 0-1.		E Larkin 0-10, L Scanlon 0-3, R Cody 0-1, M Ruth 0-1, C Browne 0-1, J McGrath 0-1, D Cody 0-1.	Referee: J Kennedy

19 October 2014 First round replay	Danesfort	1-13 - 0-11	Tullaroan	John Locke Park, Callan
12:00	R Hogan 1-6, P Hogan 0-5, O Daly 0-1, R Walsh 0-1.		M Walsh 0-6, T Walsh 0-2, P Walsh 0-2, S Maher 0-1.	Referee: G Quilty

=== Relegation play-off ===
1 November 2014 Relegation play-off	Fenians	3-10 - 0-08	Tullaroan	Páirc Lachtain, Freshford
	C Tobin 1-2, W Brennan 1-1, R Phelan 1-0, J Broderick 0-2, K Power 0-2, K Grehan 0-2, J Henderson 0-1.	Report	M Walsh 0-3, K Coogan 0-3, P Walsh 0-1, J Keoghan 0-1.	Referee: P Neary

=== Quarter-finals ===
18 October 2014 Quarter-final	Rower-Inistioge	0-12 - 0-12	Carrickshock	Thomastown Sportsfield, Thomastown
14:00	M Grace 0-8, K Joyce 0-2, J Lyng 0-1, P Lyng 0-1.		R Power 0-7, K Farrell 0-2, Jamie Power 0-1, P Mulcahy 0-1, John Power 0-1.	Referee: S Cleere

18 October 2014 Quarter-final	O'Loughlin Gaels	2-12 - 2-14	Clara	Nowlan Park, Kilkenny
16:45	M Comerford 1-1, M Bergin 0-4, S Murphy 1-0, M Kelly 0-3, D Loughnane 0-1, C Bergin 0-1, S Johnston 0-1, P Deegan 0-1.		K Hogan 0-7, L Ryan 1-2, J Nolan 1-2, L Ryan 0-1, A Murphy 0-1, C Phelan 0-1.	Referee: M O'Sullivan

19 October 2014 Quarter-final	Dicksboro	2-13 - 2-16	St. Martin's	Páirc Lachtain, Freshford
12:00	A Gaffney 0-5, E O'Donoghue 1-0, M Gaffney 1-0, S Maher 0-3, C Buckley 0-2, E Cody 0-1, Ollie Walsh 0-1, Oisín Walsh 0-1.		J Maher 1-8, C McGrath 1-1, E McGrath 0-3, C Maher 0-1, J Dowling 0-1, B Mulhall 0-1, J Mulhall 0-1.	Referee: P Burke

25 October 2014 Quarter-final	Ballyhale Shamrocks	5-23 - 2-13	Danesfort	Páirc Shéamuis Stiophán, Kilkenny
16:30	C Fennelly 2-1, B Cody 2-1, E Reid 1-4, TJ Reid 0-7, H Shefflin 0-6, J Fitzpatrick 0-4.		R Hogan 0-4, C Treacy 0-3, D Forristal 1-0, C Phelan 1-0, R Walsh 0-2, P Hogan 0-2, O Daly 0-1, P Murphy 0-1.	Referee: E Ryan

25 October 2014 Quarter-final replay	Rower-Inistioge	0-15 - 1-13	Carrickshock	Thomastown Sportsfield, Thomastown
14:00	M Grace 0-4, K Joyce 0-3, C Joyce 0-3, P Lyng 0-2, R Leahy 0-1, C Ryan 0-1, T Murphy 0-1.		R Power 0-6, Jamie Power 0-5, M Rohan 1-0, J Dalton 0-1, K Farrell 0-1.	Referee: M Flynn

=== Semi-finals ===
2 November 2014 Semi-final	Ballyhale Shamrocks	1-19 - 0-14	St. Martin's	Nowlan Park, Kilkenny
13:15	TJ Reid (0-7, frees); M Aylward (1-1); H Shefflin, J Fitzpatrick (0-3 each); E Reid (0-2); C Walsh, C Fennelly, D Hoyne (0-1 each).	Report	John Maher (0-8, five frees); Joe Maher (0-2); B Mulhall, E McGrath, T Breen, J Mulhall (0-1 each).	Referee: R Byrne

2 November 2014 Semi-final	Clara	1-19 - 0-08	Carrickshock	Nowlan Park, Kilkenny
15:00	K Hogan 0-6, J Nolan 1-1, L Ryan 0-3, C O'Shea 0-3, J Langon 0-2, D Langton 0-1, L Ryan 0-1, A Murphy 0-1, C Bolger 0-1.	Report	R Power 0-3, J Dalton 0-1, D Brennan 0-1, Jamie Power 0-1, K Farrell 0-1, M Rohan 0-1.	Referee: É Mansfield

=== Final ===
16 November 2014 Final	Ballyhale Shamrocks	1-20 - 1-13	Clara	Nowlan Park, Kilkenny
14:45	TJ Reid 0-10 (0-4 fs, 0-1 65); M Aylward 1-1; C Fennelly 0-3; E Reid, H Shefflin, J Fitzpatrick 0-2 each.	Report	K Hogan 0-5 (fs), C Bolger 1-2; C O’Shea (0-1 sl) 0-2; K Phelan (f), N Prendergast, A Murphy, L Ryan 0-1 each.	Attendance: 8,612; Referee: G Quilty

== Championship statistics ==
=== Top scorers ===
Overall

Rank	Player	County	Tally	Total	Matches	Average
1	Richie Power	Carrickshock	1-24	27	4	6.75
2	John Maher	St. Martin's	1-23	26	3	8.66
3	T. J. Reid	Ballyhale Shamrocks	0-24	24	3	8.00
4	Keith Hogan	Clara	1-20	23	4	5.75
5	Richie Hogan	Danesfort	2-16	22	3	7.33
6	Martin Boran	Erin's Own	0-14	14	1	14.00
7	Conor Phelan	Clara	0-13	13	2	6.50
8	Michael Grace	Rower-Inistioge	0-12	12	2	6.00
9	Colin Fennelly	Ballyhale Shamrocks	2-05	11	3	3.66
9	Eoin Reid	Ballyhale Shamrocks	1-08	11	3	3.66
9	Henry Shefflin	Ballyhale Shamrocks	0-11	11	3	3.66

In a single game

Rank	Player	County	Tally	Total	Opposition
1	Martin Boran	Erin's Own	0-14	14	Carrickshock
2	Conor Phelan	Clara	0-12	12	James Stephens
3	Richie Power	Carrickshock	1-08	11	Erin's Own
3	John Maher	St. Martin's	1-08	11	Dicksboro
4	Eoin Larkin	James Stephens	0-10	10	Clara
4	T. J. Reid	Ballyhale Shamrocks	0-10	10	Clara
5	Richie Hogan	Danesfort	1-06	9	Tullaroan
5	Richie Hogan	Danesfort	1-06	9	Tullaroan
6	Michael Grace	Rower-Inistioge	0-08	8	Carrickshock
6	John Maher	St. Martin's	0-08	8	Ballyhale Shamrocks
