= 2006–07 All-Ireland Senior Club Hurling Championship =

All-Ireland Senior Club Hurling Championship 2006–07
Championship Details
- Dates: 22 October 2006 – 17 March 2007
- Teams: 20

All Ireland Champions
- Winners: Ballyhale Shamrocks (4th win)
- Captain: Tom Coogan
- Manager: Maurice Aylward

All Ireland Runners-up
- Runners-up: Loughrea
- Captain: Damien McClearn
- Manager: Pat O'Connor

Provincial Champions
- Munster: Toomevara
- Leinster: Ballyhale Shamrocks
- Ulster: Ruairí Óg, Cushendall
- Connacht: Loughrea

Championship Statistics
- Matches Played: 20
- Top Scorer: Henry Shefflin (2–19)

The 2006–07 All-Ireland Senior Club Hurling Championship was the 37th staging of the All-Ireland Senior Club Hurling Championship, the Gaelic Athletic Association's premier inter-county club hurling tournament. The competition ran from 22 October 2006 to 17 March 2007.

Portumna of Galway were the defending champions, however, they failed to qualify after being beaten by Loughrea in the final of the 2006 Galway SHC. Bruree of Limerick, Loughrea of Galway, Mount Leinster Rangers of Carlow and Rathdowney–Errill of Laois made their championship debuts.

The All-Ireland final was played at Croke Park in Dublin on 17 March 2007, between Ballyhale Shamrocks of Kilkenny and Loughrea of Galway, in what was a first championship meeting between the teams. Ballyhale Shamrocks won the match by 3–12 to 2–08 to claim a record-equalling fourth title.

Henry Shefflin was the championship's top scorer with 2–19.

== Participating clubs ==
Team	County	Most recent success		
Team	County	All-Ireland	Provincial	County
Athleague	Roscommon			2003
Ballyduff	Kerry			1995
Ballyhale Shamrocks	Kilkenny	1990	1989	1991
Ballyhaunis	Mayo			2005
Birr	Offaly	2003	2002	2005
Bruree	Limerick			
Craobh Chiaráin	Dublin			2003
Erin's Own	Cork			1992
Kevin Lynch’s	Derry			1998
Loughrea	Galway			1941
Mount Leinster Rangers	Carlow			
Mount Sion	Waterford		2003	2004
Portaferry	Down			2003
Rathdowney-Errill	Laois			
Rathnure	Wexford		1998	2003
Ruairí Óg, Cushendall	Antrim		2000	1999
St. Mary's	Leitrim			2005
Toomevara	Tipperary		2004	2004
Tubbercurry	Sligo			2004
Wolfe Tones na Sionna	Clare		1997	1996

== Connacht Senior Club Hurling Championship ==
=== Connacht quarter-finals ===
22 October 2006 Quarter-final	Tubbercurry	1–09 – 1–13	St Mary's Kiltoghert	Kilcoyne Park
	M Burke (0–6), B Walsh (0–1), B Curran (0–1), R Kilcoyne (1–0), R Haughey (0–1).	Report	C Cunniffe (0–7), D Regan (0–1), J Glancy (0–1), B Carroll (0–3), D O’Grady (0–1), S McManus (1–0).	Referee: E O’Shaughnessy (Galway)

29 October 2006 Quarter-final	Athleague	1–11 – 1–07	Ballyhaunis	Athleague GAA Grounds
	M. Connaughton (0–4, one ’65, one free), T. Reddington (0–2), A. Cunniffe (0–1); B. Boyle (0–2, both frees), G. Fallon (0–1), F. Farrell (1–0), S. McGeeney (0–1).	(report)	T. Buckley (0–1), D. McConn (0–4, all frees); C. McCrudden (0–1), F. Walshe (1–0), L. Lyons (0–1).	Referee: M Haverty (Galway)

=== Connacht semi-final ===
4 November 2006 Semi-final	Athleague	3–11 – 1–07	St Mary's Kiltoghert	Athleague GAA Grounds
	B Boyle 2–3, M Connaughton 0–7, S O'Brien 1–0, G Fallon 0–1.	Report	C Cunniffe 0–6, B Carroll 1–0, J Glancy 0–1.	Referee: P Greene (Galway)

=== Connacht final ===
19 November 2006 Final	Athleague	2–03 – 2–16	Loughrea	Athleague Grounds
	B Boyle 1–1 (1f); M Connaughton 1–0 ('65); G Fallon, D McGeeney 0–1 each.	Report	M Haverty 1–3; J Maher 0–4 (3f); J O'Loughlin 1–1; K Daniels 0–3; S Cusack 0–2; K Colleran, G Keary, T Kelly 0–1.	Referee: V Neary (Mayo)

== Leinster Senior Club Hurling Championship ==
=== Leinster quarter-finals ===
29 October 2006 Quarter-final	Craobh Chiaráin	2–09 – 0–09	Mount Leinster Rangers	Parnell Park
	S McDonnell, G Ennis 1–2 each; A McCrabbe 0-5f.	(report)	SM Murphy 0–8 (5f); J Hickey 0–1.	Referee: J McGrath (Westmeath)

29 October 2006 Quarter-final	Rathnure	2–13 – 0–14	Rathdowney-Errill	Wexford Park
	S O'Neill 2–1; P Codd 0–4 (2f, 1 '65); T Hogan 0–3; N Higgins 0–2; R Flynn, M Byrne, R Codd 0–1 each.	(report)	J Purcell 0–4 (3f); L Wynne, E Meagher (1 '65) 0–2 each; S Dollard, E Holohan, B Campion (f), J Fitzpatrick, J Phelan, L Tynan 0–1 each.	Referee: É Morris (Dublin)

=== Leinster semi-finals ===
12 November 2006 Semi-final	Craobh Chiaráin	1–10 – 2–14	Birr	Parnell Park
	A McCrabbe 1–5 (0-2f, 0-1s), P O'Boyle 0–2, D Kirwan, G Ennis, J Kingston 0–1 each.	(report)	G Hanniffy, S Whelehan (0-1f) 1–1 each, B Whelehan 0–3 (2f, 1 65), S Brown, D Hayden, S Ryan 0–2 each, R Hanniffy, J Erritty, A Whelehan 0–1 each.	Referee: F Smith (Meath)

12 November 2006 Semi-final	Rathnure	1–10 – 2–14	Ballyhale Shamrocks	Wexford Park
	P Codd 0–5 (5f), N Higgins 0–4, T Hogan 1–1.	(report)	H Shefflin 1–3 (0-1f), P Reid 1–1, T J Reid, J Fitzpatrick (1f) 0–3 each, E Reid 0–2, E Fitzpatrick, C Fennelly 0–1 each.	Referee: B Kelly (Westmeath)

=== Leinster final ===
26 November 2006 Final	Ballyhale Shamrocks	1–20 – 1–08	Birr	O'Moore Park
	H Shefflin 1–5 (0-3f), TJ Reid 0–5, E Reid 0–3, P Reid, E Fitzpatrick, J 'Cha' Fitzpatrick 0–2 each, M Aylward 0–1.	(report)	J Errity 1–0, S Whelehan 0–3 (2f), P O'Meara, S Browne 0–2 each, Brian Whelehan 0–1 (f).	Referee: J McGrath (Westmeath)

== Munster Senior Club Hurling Championship ==
=== Munster quarter-finals ===
5 November 2005 Quarter-final	Wolfe Tones	1–14 – 0–05	Bruree	Cusack Park
	P O'Rourke 1–2, G McPhillips 0–6 (0-5f), B McPhillips 0–4 (0-3f), Declan 0'Rourke (0–2).	Report	S O'Halloran 0–3 (0-2f), M O'Brien, J V O'Brien (0–1) each.	Referee: J Ryan (Tipperary)

5 November 2006 Quarter-final	Ballyduff	3–07 – 3–16	Toomevara	Ballyduff Grounds
	B O'Sullivan 1–4 (0–2 frees, 0-1'45), T O'Rourke and M Boyle 1–0 each, G O'Grady 0–2, J P Leahy 0–1.	(report)	K Dunne 0–7 (0-4f), W Ryan 2–1, P Tuohy 1–0, F Devaney and M Bevans 0–2 each, P O'Brien, D Kennedy, T Dunne, K Cummins.	Referee: M O'Connor (Limerick)

=== Munster semi-finals ===
19 November 2006 Semi-final	Erin's Own	1–10 – 1–05	Wolfe Tones	Páirc Uí Chaoimh
	E Murphy 0-6f, R Carroll 1–0, M O'Connor, K Murphy (1f) 0–2 each.	(report)	P O'Rourke 1–0, G McPhillips 0-2f, B McPhillips, P Keyef, D O'Rourke 0–1 each.	Referee: S Roche (Tipperary)

19 November 2006 Semi-final	Toomevara	1–10 – 0–11	Mount Sion	McDonagh Park
	J O’Brien (1–1); K Dunne (0–3, frees); W Ryan (0–2); M Bevans, E Brislane, T Dunne, D Kennedy (0–1) each.	(report)	K McGrath (0–7, 0–6 frees); M White (0–3); E McGrath (0–1).	Referee: D Kirwan (Cork)

=== Munster final ===
3 December 2006 Final	Toomevara	2–09 – 2–08	Erin's Own	Gaelic Grounds
	K Dunne 1–4 (1–1 ‘65's, 0-3f), E Brislane 1–1, W Ryan, J O'Brien 0–2 each.	(report)	E Murphy 1–2 (0–1 ‘65', 0-1f), K Murphy 0–4, S Cronin 1–0, C O'Connor, C Coakley 0–1 each.	Referee: G Hoey (Clare)

== Ulster Senior Club Hurling Championship ==
=== Ulster semi-final ===
22 October 2005 Semi-final	Kevin Lynch’s	1–12 – 0–11	Portaferry	Casement Park
	G McGonigle 1–6 (4f); P Kelly, K Hinphey, L Hinphey (f), P Sweeney, Pauric McCloskey, Peter McCloskey 0–1 each.	Report	N Magee 0–4 (1f); A Savage, P Rogers 0–2 each; G Adair, R McGrattan (f), J Convery 0–1 each.	Referee: T McIntyre (Antrim)

=== Ulster final ===
5 November 2005 Final	Ruairí Óg, Cushendall	1–13 – 2–10	Kevin Lynch’s	Casement Park
	C McCambridge (0–4, 3 frees), E McKillop (1–0), A Delargy (0–3, frees), D McKillop (0–2), K McKeegan (0–1, 65), P McGill (0–1), B Delargy (0–1), S McNaughton (0–1).	Report	G McGonigle (2–4, 2 frees, 65), L Hinphey (0–2), M Craig (0–1), Kevin Hinphey (0–1), Pauric McCloskey (0–1), P Sweeney (0–1).	Referee: J Devlin (Tyrone)

=== Ulster final replay ===
12 November 2006 Final replay	Ruairí Óg, Cushendall	1–15 – 1–7	Kevin Lynch’s	Casement Park
	E McNaughton 1–0, K McKeegan, D McKillop, P McGill, A Delargy 0–3 each, B Delargy 0–2, S McNaughton 0–1.	(report)	G McGonigle 1–3, Kevin Hinphey 0–2, K Hinphey, M Craig 0–1 each.	Referee: D Magee (Down)

== All-Ireland Senior Club Hurling Championship ==
=== All-Ireland semi-final ===
11 February 2007 Semi-final	Ballyhale Shamrocks	2–20 – 3–14	Toomevara	O'Moore Park
	H. Shefflin 0–8 (0–7 frees); Cha Fitzpatrick 1–4; P. Reid 1–2; TJ Reid 0–2 (0–1 sideline); E. Reid 0–2; B. Aylward, D. Hoyne, 0–1 each.	(report)	P. O’Brien 1–4; K. Dunne 0–5 (0–4 frees 0–1 65); J. Delaney 1–1; E. Brislane 1–0; F. Devanney 0–3; W. Ryan 0–1.	Referee: É Morris (Dublin)

11 February 2007 Semi-final	Loughrea	1–11 – 0–9	Ruairí Óg, Cushendall	Cusack Park
	J Maher 0–7 (3f, 1 '65', 1 lb), V Maher 1–0, G Keary, B Mahony, K Colleran, M Haverty 0–1 each.	(report)	C McCambridge 0–4 (2f, 1 '65'), A Delargy 0–3, K McKeegan (f), C McKeegan 0–1 each.	Referee: B Kelly (Westmeath)

=== All-Ireland final ===
17 March 2007 Final	Ballyhale Shamrocks	3–12 – 2–8	Loughrea	Croke Park
	TJ Reid 2–2; P Reid 1–2; H Shefflin 0–3 (3f); E Reid 0–3; E Fitzpatrick 0–1 (f); M Aylward 0–1.	(report)	J Maher 1–3 (1-0f; 2 '65'); V Maher 1–0; K Colleran, J Loughlin 0–2 each, B Dooley 0–1.	Referee: D Kirwan (Cork)

== Championship statistics ==
=== Top scorers ===
Rank	Player	County	Tally	Total	Matches	Average
1	Henry Shefflin	Ballyhale Shamrocks	2–19	25	4	6.25
2	Ken Dunne	Toomevara	1–19	22	4	5.50
3	Geoffrey McGonagle	Kevin Lynch's	4-07	19	3	6.33
4	T. J. Reid	Ballyhale Shamrocks	2–12	18	4	4.50
5	John Maher	Loughrea	1–14	17	3	5.66
6	Patrick Reid	Ballyhale Shamrocks	3-07	16	4	4.00
7	Brendan Boyle	Athleague	3-06	15	3	5.00
8	Mervyn Connaughton	Athleague	1–11	14	3	4.66
9	Alan McCrabbe	Craobh Chiaráin	1–10	13	2	6.50
9	Clement Cunniffe	St Mary's	0–13	13	2	6.50
