= Mark Bergin =

Irish hurler

Personal information
- Native name: Marc Ó Beirgin (Irish)
- Born: 28 April 1989 (age 37) Kilkenny, Ireland
- Occupation: Primary school teacher
- Height: 6 ft 0 in (183 cm)

Sport
- Sport: Hurling
- Position: Centre-forward
Club*
Years	Club	Apps (scores)
2006-present	O'Loughlin Gaels	40 (12-257)
Club titles
- Kilkenny titles: 2
- Leinster titles: 1
Inter-county
- Years: County
- 2012; 2016-2017: Kilkenny
Inter-county titles
- Leinster titles: 2
- All-Irelands: 1
- NHL: 1
- All Stars: 0
- * club appearances and scores correct as of 23:26, 2 March 2020.

Mark Bergin (born 28 April 1989) is an Irish hurler who is a former captain of the Kilkenny senior team.

Bergin made his first appearance for the team during the 2012 National League, however, he remained as a peripheral figure outside of the starting fifteen. In spite of this he won a National League medal in his debut season.

At club level Bergin is a Leinster medalist with O'Loughlin Gaels. In addition to this he has also won a county club championship medal.

In January 2017, Bergin was nominated as the captain of the Kilkenny hurling team for 2017.

Sporting positions
Preceded by Shane Prendergast	Kilkenny Senior Hurling Captain; 2017	Succeeded by Cillian Buckley
