= John Maher (Kilkenny hurler) =

Irish hurler

Personal information
- Native name: Seán Ó Meachair (Irish)
- Born: 1977 (age 48–49) Muckalee, County Kilkenny, Ireland
- Occupation: Storeman
- Height: 5 ft 10 in (178 cm)

Sport
- Sport: Hurling
- Position: Left wing-forward
Clubs
- Years: Club
- Muckalee; St Martin's
Club titles
- Kilkenny titles: 0
Inter-county
Years	County	Apps (scores)
2003-2005	Kilkenny	2 (0-1)
Inter-county titles
- Leinster titles: 0
- All-Irelands: 0
- NHL: 0
- All Stars: 0

John Maher (born 1977) is an Irish hurler who played as a right corner-forward for the Kilkenny senior team.

Maher joined the team during the 2003 championship and was a regular member of the team for just three seasons. During that time he won one All-Ireland winners' medal as a non-playing substitute.

At club level Maher plays with St Martin's.
