= St Martin's GAA (Kilkenny) =

Gaelic games club in County Kilkenny, Ireland

St Martin's
- Cumann Naomh Mairtin
- Founded: 1982
- County: Kilkenny
- Colours: Red and green
- Grounds: Comerford Park
- Coordinates: 52°47′24″N 7°7′12″W

Playing kits
Standard colours

Senior Club Championships
	All Ireland	Leinster champions	Kilkenny champions
Hurling:	1	1	1

St Martin's GAA is a Gaelic Athletic Association club based in the Ballyfoyle/Coon/Muckalee area of County Kilkenny, Ireland. The catchment area is roughly comprehended by the ancient barony of Fassadinin.

The team colour is red with a green sash. The club grounds are Comerford Park, Coon.

The club won the All-Ireland Senior Club Hurling Championship in 1985.

== History ==
The club was formed in 1982 following an amalgamation of the Muckalee/Ballyfoyle Rangers and Coon clubs. The new club's adopted colours, red with a green sash, were based on a combination of the jerseys of the former clubs.

In 1984, the club won the Kilkenny Senior Hurling Championship and went on to win the Leinster Senior Club Hurling Championship in December 1984, and the 1984–85 All-Ireland Senior Club Hurling Championship in March 1985.

Former Laois senior hurling team manager Séamus Plunkett took over as manager of St Martin's in November 2022.

== Honours ==
- All-Ireland Senior Club Hurling Championships (1): 1985
- Leinster Senior Club Hurling Championships (1): 1984
- Kilkenny Senior Hurling Championships (1): 1984
- Kilkenny Intermediate Hurling Championships (3): 1973, 1975, 2002
- Kilkenny Junior Hurling Championships (2): 1967, 1974
- All-Ireland Junior B Club Hurling Championship (1): 2010
- Kilkenny Under 21 A Hurling Championship (1): 2007
- Kilkenny Under 21 B Hurling Championship (3): 1989, 1996, 2002
- Kilkenny Minor A Hurling Championship (1): 2005

== Notable players ==
- Dermot Lawler
- Mick Lawler
- John Maher
- Eamon Morrissey - winner of an All Star in 1990
- John Mulhall

== All Ireland Champions ==
The following is the team that lined out for St. Martin’s in the All-Ireland Senior Club Hurling Championship final on 24 March 1985:

Number	Player	Position
1	Bobby Shore	Goalkeeper
2	Jimmy Kelly	Right corner-back
3	Tony Maher	Full-back
4	John James Dowling	Left corner-back
5	Tom Walsh	Right wing-back
6	Jim Moran	Centre back
7	Mikey Maher	Left wing-back
8	John Moran	Midfield
9	John Morrissey	Midfield
10	Paddy Lawlor	Right wing-forward
11	Patsy Moran	Centre forward
12	Johnny Brennan (Captain)	Left wing-forward
13	Danny Coonan	Right corner-forward
14	Tom Moran	Full forward
15	Richard Maloney	Left corner-forward

== See also ==
- Kilkenny GAA
