= Joey Holden =

Irish hurler (born 1990)

Personal information
- Native name: Seosamh Ó hOldáin (Irish)
- Born: 2 July 1990 (age 36) Ballyhale, County Kilkenny, Ireland
- Occupation: Secondary school teacher
- Height: 6 ft 2 in (188 cm)

Sport
- Sport: Hurling
- Position: Left corner-back
Club
- Years: Club
- 2008-present: Ballyhale Shamrocks
Club titles
- Kilkenny titles: 11
- Leinster titles: 5
- All-Ireland Titles: 4
College
- Years: College
- University of Limerick
College titles
- Fitzgibbon titles: 0
Inter-county*
Years	County	Apps (scores)
2014-2021	Kilkenny	28 (0-03)
Inter-county titles
- Leinster titles: 5
- All-Irelands: 2
- NHL: 3
- All Stars: 1
- *Inter County team apps and scores correct as of 16:24, 17 November 2021.

Joseph Holden (born 2 July 1990) is an Irish hurler who plays as a full-back for Kilkenny Senior Championship club Ballyhale Shamrocks. He is a former captain of the Kilkenny senior hurling team.

Holden, having failed to make the minor and under-21 teams, first appeared on the inter-county scene with the Kilkenny senior team, going on to make a combined total of 54 league and championship appearances across eight seasons. He won ten major trophies with Kilkenny; two All-Ireland titles, six Leinster Championships and three National Hurling League titles. Holden served as captain of the team during the 2015 All-Ireland title-winning season and is also an All-Star-winner.

Holden joined the Ballyhale Shamrocks senior team when he was 17 and has been a regular for the team since then. Regarded as one of the most underrated but consistent defenders, he has won a four All-Ireland Club Championships. Holden has also won eight County Championship titles.

== Playing career ==
=== Ballyhale Shamrocks ===
Holden joined the Ballyhale Shamrocks club at a young age and played in all grades at juvenile and underage levels. He enjoyed much championship success in the under-21 grade before eventually joining the club's top adult team in the Kilkenny Senior Championship.

On 26 October 2008, Holden was selected on the bench when Ballyhale Shamrocks faced James Stephens in the final. He remained on the bench for the entire game but collected a winners' medal following the 2–11 to 0–12 victory. On 30 November 2008, Holden won a Leinster Championship medal as a non-playing substitute following Ballyhale's 2–13 to 0–11 defeat of Birr in the final.

Holden was again listed amongst the substitutes when Ballyhale Shamrocks faced James Stephens in a second consecutive final on 25 October 2009. He remained on the bench for the entire game but claimed a second successive winners' medal after a 1–14 to 1–11 victory. On 29 November 2009, Holden won a second Leinster Championship medal as a non-playing substitute following Ballyhale's 1–16 to 1–08 defeat of Tullamore in the final. He was again listed amongst the substitutes when Ballyhale faced Portumna in the All-Ireland final on 17 March 2010. Holden was introduced as a 47th-minute substitute for Michael Fennelly and ended the game with a winners' medal following the 1–19 to 0–17 victory.

On 23 October 2011, Holden lined out at left wing-back when Ballyhale Shamrocks faced James Stephens in the final for the third time in five years. The game ended in an 0–11 to 1–08 draw. Holden was switched to right wing-back for the replay a week later but ended on the losing side following a 1–20 to 0–15 defeat.

On 11 November 2012, Ballyhale Shamrocks qualified to play Dicksboro in the final. Holden lined out at centre-back and ended the game with a third winners' medal - his first on the field of play - after a 0–16 to 0–12 victory.

After a two-year absence, Ballyhale Shamrocks were back in the final once again on 16 November 2014. Holden collected a fourth winners' medal after a 1–20 to 1–13 victory over Clara. He later claimed a third Leinster Championship medal on 7 December 2014 after a 0–21 to 1-14 extra-time defeat of Kilcormac/Killoughey in the final. Holden was selected at full-back when Ballyhale Shamrocks faced Kilmallock in the All-Ireland final on 17 March 2015. He ended the game with a second winners' medal and the man of the match title after a 1–18 to 1–06 victory.

Holden played in a sixth final with Ballyhale Shamrocks on 30 October 2016. Lining out at centre-back, he ended the game on the losing side following a 0–19 to 1–12 defeat by O'Loughlin Gaels.

On 28 October 2018, Holden claimed his fifth winners' medal when Ballyhale Shamrocks defeated Bennettsbridge by 2–20 to 2–17 to win the Kilkenny Championship. He again lined out at full-back when Ballyhale faced Ballyboden St. Enda's in the Leinster final and ended the game with a fourth provincial winners' medal after the 2–21 to 0–11 victory. Holden retained his position at full-back when Ballyhale qualified for the All-Ireland final on 17 March 2019. He collected a third winners' medal following the 2–28 to 2–11 victory over St. Thomas's. Holden was one of six Ballyhale Shamrocks hurlers later chosen on the Team of the Year.

On 27 October 2019, Holden lined out at full-back when Ballyhale Shamrocks faced James Stephens in the Kilkenny Championship final. He collected a sixth winners' medal after the 2–21 to 1–15 victory. On 1 December 2019, Holden again lined out at full-back when Ballyhale Shamrocks faced St. Mullin's in the Leinster final. He ended the game with a fifth winners' medal following the 1–21 to 0–15 victory. On 18 January 2020, Holden made his fourth All-Ireland final appearance when Ballyhale Shamrocks faced Borris-Ileigh. He ended the game with a fourth All-Ireland medal after the 0–18 to 0–15 victory.

=== Kilkenny ===
==== Senior ====
Holden was drafted onto the Kilkenny senior team in advance of the 2014 National League. He made his first appearance for the team on 16 February 2014 when he lined out at right wing-back in a 1–16 to 0–18 defeat by Clare. He was again at right wing-back when Kilkenny faced Tipperary in the National League final on 4 May 2014. Holden ended the game with a winners' medal following the 2–25 to 1–27 victory. On 6 July 2014, he won a Leinster Championship medal after lining out at right wing-back in Kilkenny's 0–24 to 1–09 defeat of Dublin in the Leinster final. On 7 September 2014, Holden was again at right wing-back when Kilkenny drew 3–22 to 1–28 with Tipperary in the All-Ireland final. Holden was dropped from the starting fifteen for the replay on 27 September 2014 but was introduced on two occasions as a temporary substitute for both Jackie Tyrrell and J. J. Delaney. He ended the game with an All-Ireland medal following the 2–17 to 2–14 victory.

On 8 December 2014 Holden was nominated for the captaincy of the Kilkenny senior team. He won a second successive Leinster Championship medal on 5 July 2015 after captaining the team from full-back to a 1–25 to 2–15 defeat of Galway in the Leinster final. On 6 September 2015, Holden again captained the team from full-back for the All-Ireland final against Galway. He ended the game with a second successive All-Ireland medal following the 1–22 to 1–18 victory while he also had the honour of lifting the Liam MacCarthy Cup as captain. Holden was later included in the full-back position on the All-Star team.

Holden won a third successive Leinster Championship medal on 3 July 2016 following a 1–26 to 0–22 defeat of Galway in the final. He was again at full-back for the All-Ireland final against Tipperary on 4 September 2016. Holden ended the game on the losing side following a 2–29 to 2–20 defeat.

On 8 April 2018, Holden was at right corner-back when Kilkenny faced Tipperary in the National League final. He ended the game with a second winners' medal following the 2–23 to 2–17 victory. Holden was switched to right wing-back when Kilkenny drew 0-18 apiece with Galway in the Leinster final on 1 July 2018. He retained the position for the replay a week later and scored a point from play in the 1–28 to 3–15 defeat.

On 30 June 2019, Holden was selected at left wing-back when Kilkenny qualified to play Wexford in the Leinster final. He ended the game on the losing side following a 1–23 to 0–23 defeat. On 18 August 2019, Holden was selected at left corner-back when Kilkenny for the All-Ireland final against Tipperary. He was substituted by Conor Delaney in the 38th minute and ended the game on the losing side following a 3-25 the 0–20 defeat.

In November 2021, Holden announced his retirement from inter-county hurling.

== Career statistics ==
Team	Year	National League			Leinster		All-Ireland		Total	
Team	Year	Division	Apps	Score	Apps	Score	Apps	Score	Apps	Score
Kilkenny	2014	Division 1A	6	0-00	2	0-00	2	0-00	10	0-00
Kilkenny	2015	Division 1A	1	0-00	2	0-00	2	0-00	5	0-00
Kilkenny	2016	Division 1A	7	0-00	2	0-00	3	0-00	12	0-00
Kilkenny	2017	Division 1A	3	0-00	0	0-00	1	0-00	4	0-00
Kilkenny	2018	Division 1A	7	0-00	6	0-02	1	0-00	14	0-02
Kilkenny	2019	Division 1A	0	0-00	3	0-01	3	0-00	6	0-01
Kilkenny	2020	Division 1B	0	0-00	1	0-00	0	0-00	1	0-00
Kilkenny	2021	Division 1B	2	0-00	0	0-00	0	0-00	0	0-00
Total			26	0-00	16	0-03	12	0-00	54	0-03

== Honours ==
Ballyhale Shamrocks

- All-Ireland Senior Club Hurling Championship: 2010, 2015, 2019, 2020
- Leinster Senior Club Hurling Championship: 2008, 2009, 2014, 2018, 2019, 2021, 2022
- Kilkenny Senior Hurling Championship: 2008, 2009, 2012, 2014, 2018, 2019, 2020, 2021, 2022 2025, 2026
- Kilkenny Under-21 Hurling Championship: 2005, 2006

Kilkenny

- All-Ireland Senior Hurling Championship: 2014, 2015 (c)
- Leinster Senior Hurling Championship: 2014, 2015 (c), 2016, 2020, 2021
- National Hurling League: 2014, 2018, 2021
- Walsh Cup: 2014

Individual

- All-Star: 2015
- AIB Club Hurler of the Year: 2023

Sporting positions
Preceded by Lester Ryan	Kilkenny Senior Hurling Captain; 2015	Succeeded by Shane Prendergast
Achievements
Preceded by Lester Ryan	All-Ireland Senior Hurling Final winning captain 2015	Succeeded by Brendan Maher
