= 2023 Kilkenny Senior Hurling League =

- Dates: 4 Aug - 23 September 2023
- Teams: 12
- Sponsor: St. Canice's Credit Union
- Champions: Dicksboro (6th title)
- Runners-up: Glenmore

The 2023 Kilkenny Senior Hurling League was the 30th staging of the competition since its establishment by the Kilkenny County Board in 1992.

The league competition consisted of 12 teams divided into two groups of six and ran from 4 July to 23 September 2023.

The second-placed team in each group qualified to compete in the shield final. In this game O'Loughlin Gaels defeated James Stephens by 5–20 to 2–15.

The first-placed team in each group qualified for the league final in which Dicksboro defeated Glenmore by 3–19 to 0–15 at UPMC Nowlan Park on 23 September 2023. It was the club's sixth league title.

== Results ==
=== Group Stage ===
==== Group A Table ====
Team	P	W	D	L	F	A	+/-	Pts	Qualification	
Glenmore	5	4	0	1	111	97	14	8	league final	championship quarter-final
James Stephens	5	2	2	1	116	107	9	6	shield final	championship quarter-final
Graigue-Ballycallan	5	2	1	2	96	101	-5	5	championship round 1	
Bennettsbridge	5	2	1	2	101	94	7	5	championship round 1	
Ballyhale Shamrocks	5	1	2	2	125	128	-3	4	championship round 1	
Erin's Own	5	0	2	3	87	109	-22	2	championship round 1	

==== Group A results ====
August 4, 2023 Round 1	Bennettsbridge	1-21 – 1-12	Erin's Own
				Venue: Pairc Lachtain
				Referee: O Beehan

August 4, 2023 Round 1	James Stephens	2-21 – 1-17	Graigue-Ballycallan
				Venue: Danesfort
				Referee: E Crowley

August 5, 2023 Round 1	Ballyhale Shamrocks	2-14 – 1-20	Glenmore
				Venue: Páirc na Seamróg
				Referee: M Flynn

August 12, 2023 Round 2	Erin's Own	1-20 – 1-20	Ballyhale Shamrocks
				Venue: Tom Ryall Park
				Referee: S Delaney

August 12, 2023 Round 2	Graigue-Ballycallan	0-17 – 0-14	Bennettsbridge
				Venue: Pairc Sheamuis Stiopháin
				Referee: P Burke

August 13, 2023 Round 2	Glenmore	2-18 – 0-23	James Stephens
				Venue: Thomastown
				Referee: D Hughes

August 18, 2023 Round 3	Bennettsbridge	0-10 – 0-10	James Stephens
				Venue: Danesfort
				Referee: R Dowling

August 18, 2023 Round 3	Erin's Own	0-10 – 1-17	Glenmore
				Venue: St John's Park
				Referee: C Everard

August 19, 2023 Round 3	Graigue-Ballycallan	0-20 – 2-21	Ballyhale Shamrocks
				Venue: John Locke Park
				Referee: P O'Reilly

September 1, 2023 Round 4	Glenmore	0-15 – 1-18	Graigue-Ballycallan
				Venue: John Locke Park
				Referee: M Flynn

September 1, 2023 Round 4	James Stephens	0-24 – 0-21	Erin's Own
				Venue: Muckalee
				Referee: P O'Reilly

September 3, 2023 Round 4	Ballyhale Shamrocks	2-17 – 2-24	Bennettsbridge
				Venue: Thomastown
				Referee: D Hughes

September 9, 2023 Round 5	Graigue-Ballycallan	1-15 – 1-15	Erin's Own
				Venue: Pairc Lachtain
				Referee: R Dowling

September 9, 2023 Round 5	Bennettsbridge	2-17 – 2-23	Glenmore
				Venue: Inistioge
				Referee: E Crowley

September 9, 2023 Round 5	James Stephens	2-26 – 5-17	Ballyhale Shamrocks
				Venue: John Locke Park
				Referee: G Quilty

==== Group B Table ====
Team	P	W	D	L	F	A	+/-	Pts	Qualification	
Dicksboro	5	5	0	0	141	89	52	10	league final	championship quarter-final
O'Loughlin Gaels	5	4	0	1	127	94	33	8	shield final	championship quarter-final
Tullaroan	5	3	0	2	121	107	14	6	championship round 1	
Clara	5	2	0	3	110	112	-2	4	championship round 1	
Mullinavat	5	1	0	4	89	130	-41	2	championship round 1	
Danesfort	5	0	0	5	78	134	-56	0	championship round 1	

==== Group B results ====
August 5, 2023 Round 1	Dicksboro	5-18 – 3-11	Clara
				Venue: Páirc Shéamuis Stiophán
				Referee: G Quilty

August 6, 2023 Round 1	Tullaroan	0-20 – 1-25	O'Loughlin Gaels
				Venue: Clara
				Referee: R Byrne

August 6, 2023 Round 1	Danesfort	0-16 – 0-24	Mullinavat
				Venue: Dunnamaggin
				Referee: C Everard

August 11, 2023 Round 2	O'Loughlin Gaels	1-17 – 1-20	Dicksboro
				Venue: Páirc Shéamuis Stiophán
				Referee: M O'Sullivan

August 11, 2023 Round 2	Mullinavat	1-9 – 6-21	Tullaroan
				Venue: John Lockes
				Referee: O Beehan

August 11, 2023 Round 2	Clara	0-23 – 0-13	Danesfort
				Venue: Bennettsbridge
				Referee: R Byrne

August 18, 2023 Round 3	Clara	2-8 – 1-16	Tullaroan
				Venue: Urlingford
				Referee: P Burke

August 19, 2023 Round 3	Mullinavat	1-10 – 1-15	O'Loughlin Gaels
				Venue: Hugginstown
				Referee: G Quilty

August 20, 2023 Round 3	Danesfort	0-11 – 2-22	Dicksboro
				Venue: Páirc Shéamuis Stiophán
				Referee: G Rafter

September 2, 2023 Round 4	Tullaroan	2-21 – 1-19	Danesfort
				Venue: Canon Kearns Park
				Referee: J O'Dwyer

September 2, 2023 Round 4	Dicksboro	2-20 – 1-19	Mullinavat
				Venue: Dunnamaggin
				Referee: P Burke

September 2, 2023 Round 4	O'Loughlin Gaels	0-29 – 1-19	Clara
				Venue: Gowran
				Referee: J Kennedy

September 9, 2023 Round 5	Clara	4-19 – 1-15	Mullinavat
				Venue: Dr Tierney Park
				Referee: E Hayes

September 4, 2023 Round 5	Danesfort	0-16 – 3-23	O'Loughlin Gaels
				Venue: Jenkinstown
				Referee: M Flynn

September 9, 2023 Round 5	Dicksboro	4-19 – 0-16	Tullaroan
				Venue: Ballyragget
				Referee: P O'Reilly

=== Knockout Stage ===
==== Shield Final ====
September 23, 2023	O'Loughlin Gaels	5-20 – 2-15	James Stephens
				Venue: Nowlan Park
				Referee: P O'Reilly

==== League Final ====
September 23, 2023	Dicksboro	3-19 – 0-15	Glenmore
				Venue: Nowlan Park
				Referee: R Byrne
