= 2022 Kilkenny Senior Hurling League =

- Dates: 30 July - 17 September 2022
- Teams: 12
- Sponsor: St. Canice's Credit Union
- Champions: Tullaroan (3rd title)
- Runners-up: Bennettsbridge

The 2022 Kilkenny Senior Hurling League was the 29th staging of the competition since its establishment by the Kilkenny County Board in 1992.

The league competition consisted of 12 teams divided into two groups of six and ran from 30 July to 17 September 2022.

The second-placed team in each group qualified to compete in the shield final. In this game Clara defeated Dicksboro by 2–18 to 1–19.

The first-placed team in each group qualified for the league final in which Tullaroan defeated defending champions Bennettsbridge by 1–24 to 0–13 at UPMC Nowlan Park on 17 September 2022. It was the club's third league title.

== Results ==
=== Group Stage ===
==== Group A Table ====
Team	P	W	D	L	F	A	+/-	Pts	Qualification	
Tullaroan	5	3	1	1	122	100	22	7	league final	championship quarter-final
Clara	5	3	1	1	129	114	15	7	shield final	championship quarter-final
Ballyhale Shamrocks	5	3	0	2	122	112	10	6	championship round 1	
Mullinavat	5	3	0	2	96	107	-11	6	championship round 1	
Erin's Own	5	1	0	4	91	107	-16	2	championship round 1	
Lisdowney	5	1	0	4	96	116	-20	2	championship round 1	

==== Group A results ====
July 30, 2022 Round 1	Erin's Own	0-13 – 2-16	Tullaroan
				Venue: Pairc Lachtain
				Referee: O Beehan

July 30, 2022 Round 1	Mullinavat	0-12 – 2-15	Lisdowney
				Venue: Pairc Sheamuis Stiopháin
				Referee: C Everard

July 31, 2022 Round 1	Clara	2-22 – 1-24	Ballyhale Shamrocks
				Venue: Thomastown
				Referee: E Hayes

August 5, 2022 Round 2	Lisdowney	1-13 – 0-22	Erin's Own
				Venue: Ballyragget
				Referee: D Hughes

August 6, 2022 Round 2	Tullaroan	0-24 – 2-18	Clara
				Venue: St John's Park
				Referee: G Rafter

August 6, 2022 Round 2	Ballyhale Shamrocks	1-26 – 1-13	Mullinavat
				Venue: Páirc na Seamróg
				Referee: S Cleere

August 13, 2022 Round 3	Ballyhale Shamrocks	2-16 – 1-17	Lisdowney
				Venue: Tullaroan
				Referee: R Dowling

August 13, 2022 Round 3	Clara	3-17 – 1-15	Erin's Own
				Venue: Muckalee
				Referee: S Cleere

August 14, 2022 Round 3	Tullaroan	1-17 – 2-18	Mullinavat
				Venue: Hugginstown
				Referee: M Flynn

August 26, 2022 Round 4	Mullinavat	1-20 – 0-19	Clara
				Venue: Thomastown
				Referee: C Everard

August 27, 2022 Round 4	Erin's Own	0-20 – 0-22	Ballyhale Shamrocks
				Venue: Nowlan Park
				Referee: P Burke

August 27, 2022 Round 4	Lisdowney	0-17 – 1-25	Tullaroan
				Venue: Pairc Lachtain
				Referee: M O'Sullivan

September 4, 2022 Round 5	Tullaroan	0-28 – 2-16	Ballyhale Shamrocks
				Venue: John Locke Park
				Referee: E Hayes

September 4, 2022 Round 5	Clara	1-29 – 1-19	Lisdowney
				Venue: Jenkinstown
				Referee: O Beehan

September 4, 2022 Round 5	Erin's Own	2-12 – 1-18	Mullinavat
				Venue: Gowran
				Referee: D Hughes

==== Group B Table ====
Team	P	W	D	L	F	A	+/-	Pts	Qualification	
Bennettsbridge	5	5	0	0	112	81	31	10	league final	championship quarter-final
Dicksboro	5	4	0	1	125	86	39	8	shield final	championship quarter-final
O'Loughlin Gaels	5	3	0	2	111	109	2	6	championship round 1	
Glenmore	5	2	0	3	111	125	-14	4	championship round 1	
James Stephens	5	1	0	4	93	108	-15	2	championship round 1	
Graigue-Ballycallan	5	0	0	5	85	128	-43	0	championship round 1	

==== Group B results ====
July 30, 2022 Round 1	Dicksboro	0-17 – 2-20	Bennettsbridge
				Venue: Clara
				Referee: G Quilty

July 30, 2022 Round 1	O'Loughlin Gaels	4-19 – 3-13	Graigue-Ballycallan
				Venue: John Locke Park
				Referee: J Kennedy

July 31, 2022 Round 1	James Stephens	0-20 – 1-26	Glenmore
				Venue: Dr Tierney Park
				Referee: M Flynn

August 5, 2022 Round 2	Bennettsbridge	0-21 – 1-12	O'Loughlin Gaels
				Venue: Gowran
				Referee: R Byrne

August 6, 2022 Round 2	Graigue-Ballycallan	0-13 – 2-15	James Stephens
				Venue: Danesfort
				Referee: R Dowling

August 6, 2022 Round 2	Glenmore	1-11 – 4-23	Dicksboro
				Venue: Inistioge
				Referee: P Burke

August 13, 2022 Round 3	Bennettsbridge	2-18 – 0-17	James Stephens
				Venue: Danesfort
				Referee: J Kennedy

August 13, 2022 Round 3	O'Loughlin Gaels	1-13 – 2-17	Dicksboro
				Venue: Nowlan Park
				Referee: G Quilty

August 13, 2022 Round 3	Graigue-Ballycallan	2-15 – 2-21	Glenmore
				Venue: Thomastown
				Referee: M O'Sullivan

August 26, 2022 Round 4	Glenmore	2-13 – 3-15	Bennettsbridge
				Venue: Inistioge
				Referee: J Walsh

August 27, 2022 Round 4	Dicksboro	3-23 – 1-13	Graigue-Ballycallan
				Venue: John Locke Park
				Referee: R Byrne

August 27, 2022 Round 4	James Stephens	2-15 – 1-21	O'Loughlin Gaels
				Venue: Nowlan Park
				Referee: O Beehan

September 3, 2022 Round 5	Dicksboro	2-12 – 0-14	James Stephens
				Venue: Nowlan Park
				Referee: P Burke

September 4, 2022 Round 5	Bennettsbridge	0-17 – 0-13	Graigue-Ballycallan
				Venue: Dunnamaggin
				Referee: G Rafter

September 4, 2022 Round 5	O'Loughlin Gaels	3-16 – 1-19	Glenmore
				Venue: Thomastown
				Referee: M Flynn

=== Knockout Stage ===
==== Shield Final ====
September 17, 2022	Clara	2-18 – 1-19	Dicksboro
				Venue: Thomastown
				Referee: J Kennedy

==== League Final ====
September 17, 2022	Tullaroan	1-24 – 0-13	Bennettsbridge
				Venue: Nowlan Park
				Referee: S Delaney
