= 2023 Kilkenny Senior Hurling Championship =

Annual hurling competition season

- Dates: 23 September - 29 October 2023
- Teams: 12
- Sponsor: St. Canice's Credit Union
- Champions: O'Loughlin Gaels (5th title); Mark Bergin (captain); Brian Hogan (manager)
- Runners-up: Ballyhale Shamrocks; Evan Shefflin (captain); Pat Hoban (manager)
- Relegated: Danesfort

Tournament statistics
- Matches played: 12
- Goals scored: 33 (2.75 per match)
- Points scored: 380 (31.67 per match)
- Top scorer(s): T. J. Reid (3-30)

The 2023 Kilkenny Senior Hurling Championship was the 129th staging of the Kilkenny Senior Hurling Championship since its establishment by the Kilkenny County Board in 1887. The opening-round fixtures were confirmed on 9 September 2023. The championship ran from 23 September to 29 October 2023.

Ballyhale Shamrocks entered the championship as the defending champions in search of a record sixth consecutive title. Danesfort were relegated after just one year of top flight hurling.

The final was played on 29 October 2023 at UPMC Nowlan Park in Kilkenny, between Ballyhale Shamrocks and O'Loughlin Gaels, in what was their fourth meeting in the final overall and a first final meeting in two years. O'Loughlin Gaels won the match by 0-20 to 0-19 to claim their fifth championship title overall and a first title in seven years.

T. J. Reid was the championship's top scorer with 3-30.

== Team changes ==
=== To Championship ===
Promoted from the Kilkenny Intermediate Hurling Championship

- Danesfort

=== From Championship ===
Relegated to the Kilkenny Intermediate Hurling Championship

- Lisdowney

== Results ==
=== First round ===
23 September 2023 First round	Ballyhale Shamrocks	2-16 - 0-14	Danesfort	John Locke Park
	TJ Reid (2-5, 0-5 frees), A Mullen (0-3), N Shortall, E Cody, S Barron (0-2 each), C Fennelly, E Shefflin (0-1 each)	Report	R Hogan (0-7, 0-5 frees and 0-1 ‘65), P Hogan (0-3, 0-3 frees), P Hickey, C Phelan, R Walsh, C Kearney (0-1 each).	Referee: M Flynn (Mooncoin)

24 September 2023 First round	Tullaroan	3-10 - 5-12	Bennettsbridge	UPMC Nowlan Park
	S Walsh (0-7, 0-6 frees); B Gaffney (1-1); M Keoghan, T Walsh (Mountgale) (1-0 each); J Keoghan, B Walton (0-1 each).	Report	L Blanchfield (4-2); J Hughes (1-3); N Cleere (0-3, 0-2 frees); S Morrissey (0-2); C Brennan, D Blanchfield (0-1 each).	Referee: O Beehan

24 September 2023 First round	Graigue-Ballycallan	1-18 - 1-14	Clara	UPMC Nowlan Park
	S Ryan (0-7, 0-6 frees), C Prendiville (1-0), B Ryan, A McEvoy, T Ronan (0-3 each), B O’Neill, T Dunphy (0-1 each)	Report	D Glynn (0-4, 0-3 frees and 0-1 ‘65), J Murphy (0-4), OG (1-0), P Cody (0-3), M O’Connell (0-2), M Kenny (0-1, 0-1 free)	Referee: J Kennedy (Ballyhale Shamrocks)

24 September 2023 First round	Mullinavat	4-11 - 0-10	Erin's Own	Danesfort Grounds
	J Walsh (1-5, 0-4 frees); L Fennelly, O Knox (1-1 each), W O’Dwyer (1-1, 0-1 free); J Gahan (0-2); A Mansfield (0-1).	Report	J Buggy (0-4, frees); M Brennan, J Brennan (0-2 each); J Holohan, J Dowd (0-1 each).	Referee: D Hughes

=== Relegation playoff ===
7 October 2023 Relegation playoff	Erin's Own	1-17 - 1-15	Danesfort	Páirc Lachtain
	J Buggy (0-10, 0-9 frees); C Fogarty (1-0); J Dowd, M Boran, C McMahon, M Brennan, A Moran, J Holohan, S Coogan (0-1 each).	Report	R Hogan (1-6, 0-5 frees, 1-0 pen); P Hickey (0-2); P Hogan (0-1, free); C Kearney, R Walsh, B Whitty, P Cooney, D O’Neill, D Dunne (0-1 each).

=== Quarter-finals ===
30 September 2023 Quarter-final	O'Loughlin Gaels	0-18 - 2-10	Mullinavat	Thomastown Grounds
	M Bergin (0-9, 0-6 frees); D Fogarty, P Butler, S Bolger (0-2 each); M Butler, S Murphy (free), J Molloy 0-1 each).	Report	J Walsh (0-7, 0-4 frees and 0-2 65s); O Knox (2-1); G Malone, J Gahan (0-1 each).

30 September 2023 Quarter-final	Glenmore	0-17 - 3-14	Bennettsbridge	Clara Grounds
	A Murphy (0-8, 0-7 frees); C Beirne (0-3); I Byrne, B Reid (0-2 each); E Murphy, G Aylward (0-1 each).	Report	L Blanchfield (1-2); C Brennan (1-1); N Cleere (0-4, 0-3 frees and 0-1 ‘65); J Campion (1-0); J Cleere, K Blanchfield (0-3 each); E Cleere (0-1, 0-1 free).

1 October 2023 Quarter-final	Dicksboro	0-21 - 1-20	Ballyhale Shamrocks	UPMC Nowlan Park
	A Gaffney (0-13, 0-10 frees and 0-1 ‘65); H Shine, L Moore (0-2 each); C Hackett, C Buckley, B Sheehan (0-1 each)		TJ Reid (0-10, 0-6 frees and 0-1 ‘65); A Mullen (1-4); E Cody (0-3); C Fennelly; E Shefflin; C Walsh (0-1 each).

1 October 2023 Quarter-final	James Stephens	1-18 - 0-15	Graigue-Ballycallan	UPMC Nowlan Park
	L Scanlon (0-5), N Brassil (1-2, 0-1 free); E Guilfoyle (0-3, 0-2 frees); R Whelan, Sean Manogue, W Spencer (0-2 each); Stephen Manogue (0-2, 0-1 free).	Report	S Ryan (0-5, 0-5 frees); J Roberts (0-5); A McEvoy, T Ronan, J Neary, B O’Neill, C Murphy (0-1 each).

=== Semi-finals ===
15 October 2023 Semi-final	O'Loughlin Gaels	3-16 - 0-22	Bennettsbridge	UPMC Nowlan Park
	M Bergin (0-8, 4f), O Wall (2-0), C Kelly (1-1), D Fogarty and C Heary (0-2 each), P Deegan, J Molloy and P Butler (0-1 each).	Report	N Cleere (0-11, 9f and 2 '65's), D Blanchfield (0-3), H O'Neill (0-2), J Cleere, S Morrissey, B Hughes, J Hughes, D Murphy and J Campion (0-1 each).	Referee: C Everard (Graigue-Ballycallan)

15 October 2023 Semi-final	James Stephens	0-14 - 5-19	Ballyhale Shamrocks	UPMC Nowlan Park
	E Guilfoyle (0-4, 4f), N Brassil (0-2, 2f), C Kenny (0-2, 1f), A Parsons and L Scanlon (0-2 each), Stephen Manogue (0-1, 1f), R Whelan (0-1)	Report	TJ Reid (1-6, 2f), C Fennelly (2-0), A Mullen (1-3), E Cody (1-1), N Shortall, E Kenneally, L Barron and P Mullen (0-2 each), S Barron (0-1)	Referee: P O'Reilly (Barrow Rangers)

=== Final ===
29 October 2023 Final	Ballyhale Shamrocks	0-19 - 0-20	O'Loughlin Gaels	UPMC Nowlan Park
	TJ Reid (0-9, 0-6f); E Cody (0-3); A Mullen and C Fennelly (both 0-2); E Shefflin, C Walsh, E Kenneally (all 0-1).	Report	M Bergin (0-10, 0-6f and 0-1 ‘65’); P Deegan and J Nolan (both 0-2); D Fogarty, C Heary, O Wall, S Bolger, C Kelly and L Hogan (all 0-1).	Attendance: 7,015; Referee: P Burke (Emeralds)

== Championship statistics ==
=== Top scorers ===
Overall

Rank	Player	Club	Tally	Total	Matches	Average
1	T. J. Reid	Ballyhale Shamrocks	3-30	39	4	9.75
4	Mark Bergin	O'Loughlin Gaels	0-27	27	3	9.00
2	Liam Blanchfield	Bennettsbridge	5-04	19	3	6.33
3	Adrian Mullen	Ballyhale Shamrocks	2-12	18	4	4.50
3	Nicky Cleere	Bennettsbridge	0-18	18	3	6.00
5	Richie Hogan	Danesfort	1-13	16	2	8.00
7	John Walsh	Mullinavat	1-12	15	2	7.50
8	Jack Buggy	Erin's Own	0-14	14	2	7.00
9	Andrew Gaffney	Dicksboro	0-13	13	1	13.00
10	Eoin Cody	Ballyhale Shamrocks	1-09	12	4	3.00
10	Seán Ryan	Graigue-Ballycallan	0-12	12	2	6.00

In a single game

Rank	Player	Club	Tally	Total	Opposition
1	Liam Blanchfield	Bennettsbridge	4-02	14	Tullaroan
2	Andrew Gaffney	Dicksboro	0-13	13	Ballyhale Shamrocks
3	T. J. Reid	Ballyhale Shamrocks	2-05	11	Danesfort
3	Nicky Cleere	Bennettsbridge	0-11	11	O'Loughlin Gaels
5	Jack Buggy	Danesfort	0-10	10	Erin's Own
5	Mark Bergin	O'Loughlin Gaels	0-10	10	Ballyhale Shamrocks
5	T. J. Reid	Ballyhale Shamrocks	0-10	10	Dicksboro
8	Richie Hogan	Danesfort	1-06	9	Erin's Own
8	T. J. Reid	Ballyhale Shamrocks	1-06	9	James Stephens
8	T. J. Reid	Ballyhale Shamrocks	0-09	9	O'Loughlin Gaels
8	Mark Bergin	O'Loughlin Gaels	0-09	9	Mullinavat
