= 2025 Kilkenny Senior Hurling League =

- Dates: 31 July – 14 September 2025
- Teams: 12
- Sponsor: St. Canice's Credit Union
- Champions: O'Loughlin Gaels (3rd title)
- Runners-up: Thomastown

The 2025 Kilkenny Senior Hurling League was the 32nd staging of the competition since its establishment by the Kilkenny County Board in 1992.

The league competition consisted of 12 teams divided into two groups of six and ran from 31 July to 14 September 2025.

The first-placed team in each group qualified for the league final in which O'Loughlin Gaels defeated Thomastown by 1–19 to 0–17 at Nowlan Park, Kilkenny on 14 September 2025. It was the club's third league title.

The second-placed team in each group qualified to compete for a subsidiary title in the shield final. In this game Mullinavat defeated Glenmore by 2–1 in a penalty shoot-out after the game finished level, after extra time, on a scoreline of 2–19 to 0–25.

== Results ==
=== Group Stage ===
==== Group A Table ====
Team	P	W	D	L	F	A	+/-	Pts	Qualification	
O'Loughlin Gaels	5	4	0	1	125	101	24	8	league final	championship quarter-final
Glenmore	5	4	0	1	122	109	13	8	shield final	championship quarter-final
Ballyhale Shamrocks	5	3	0	2	144	124	20	6	championship round 1	
Bennettsbridge	5	2	1	2	105	112	-7	5	championship round 1	
Dicksboro	5	1	1	3	111	114	-3	3	championship round 1	
Lisdowney	5	0	0	5	103	150	-47	0	championship round 1	

==== Group A Results ====
Round 1

31 July 2025; Group A Round 1	Ballyhale Shamrocks	3–23 1–22	Bennettsbridge	Thomastown; Referee: D Hughes

2 August 2025; Group A Round 1	Dicksboro	3–21 2–16	Lisdowney	Freshford; Referee: C Everard

2 August 2025; Group A Round 1	O'Loughlin Gaels	0–25 0–23	Glenmore	Mullinavat; Referee: O Kenny

Round 2

9 August 2025; Group A Round 2	Bennettsbridge	1–19 0–22	Dicksboro	Clara; Referee: S Delaney

10 August 2025; Group A Round 2	Glenmore	2–21 2–20	Ballyhale Shamrocks	Glenmore; Referee: G Quilty

10 August 2025; Group A Round 2	Lisdowney	1–16 5–19	O'Loughlin Gaels	Castlecomer; Referee: R Holland

Round 3

16 August 2025; Group A Round 3	O'Loughlin Gaels	1–19 0–19	Dicksboro	Nowlan Park; Referee: P O’Reilly

16 August 2025; Group A Round 3	Lisdowney	3–14 4–25	Ballyhale Shamrocks	Kilmanagh; Referee: J O’Dwyer

17 August 2025; Group A Round 3	Glenmore	1–20 1–16	Bennettsbridge	Inistioge; Referee: E Maher

Round 4

23 August 2025; Group A Round 4	Ballyhale Shamrocks	0–22 2–23	O'Loughlin Gaels	Thomastown; Referee: E Maher

23 August 2025; Group A Round 4	Dicksboro	0–20 2–15	Glenmore	Mooncoin; Referee: M Flynn

24 August 2025; Group A Round 4	Bennettsbridge	0–21 1–17	Lisdowney	Castlecomer; Referee: P Burke

Round 5

6 September 2025; Group A Round 5	Lisdowney	2–13 0–28	Glenmore	Danesfort; Referee: P Cahill

6 September 2025; Group A Round 5	O'Loughlin Gaels	1–12 0–18	Bennettsbridge	Kells Road; Referee: M Flynn

6 September 2025; Group A Round 5	Dicksboro	1–17 2–21	Ballyhale Shamrocks	Gowran; Referee: O Beehan

==== Group B Table ====
Team	P	W	D	L	F	A	+/-	Pts	Qualification	
Thomastown	5	5	0	0	142	117	25	10	league final	championship quarter-final
Mullinavat	5	3	1	1	122	107	15	7	shield final	championship quarter-final
Tullaroan	5	3	0	2	128	127	1	6	championship round 1	
Erin's Own	5	1	1	3	103	129	-26	3	championship round 1	
Clara	5	1	0	4	116	124	-8	2	championship round 1	
Graigue-Ballycallan	5	0	2	3	118	125	-7	2	championship round 1	

==== Group B Results ====
Round 1

2 August 2025; Group B Round 1	Mullinavat	1–24 2–13	Erin's Own	Danesfort; Referee: P Burke

2 August 2025; Group B Round 1	Clara	1–20 0–22	Graigue-Ballycallan	Bennettsbridge; Referee: B Fox

2 August 2025; Group B Round 1	Thomastown	3–21 1–25	Tullaroan	Callan; Referee: J O’Dwyer

Round 2

8 August 2025; Group B Round 2	Tullaroan	0–24 0–22	Clara	Ballyragget; Referee: C Everard

9 August 2025; Group B Round 2	Graigue-Ballycallan	3–18 2–21	Mullinavat	Dunnamaggin; Referee: P Cahill

10 August 2025; Group B Round 2	Erin's Own	0–17 4–18	Thomastown	St John's Park; Referee: P O’Reilly

Round 3

16 August 2025; Group B Round 3	Tullaroan	1–24 0–24	Graigue-Ballycallan	Freshford; Referee: P Burke

16 August 2025; Group B Round 3	Erin's Own	1–19 1–18	Clara	Muckalee; Referee: V Holmes

16 August 2025; Group B Round 3	Thomastown	0–22 2–12	Mullinavat	Callan; Referee: B Fox

Round 4

23 August 2025; Group B Round 4	Graigue-Ballycallan	1–17 1–17	Erin's Own	Ballyragget; Referee: S Cleere

24 August 2025; Group B Round 4	Mullinavat	3–17 0–18	Tullaroan	Hugginstown; Referee: R Byrne

24 August 2025; Group B Round 4	Clara	2–23 3–23	Thomastown	Gowran; Referee: D Hughes

Round 5

7 September 2025; Group B Round 5	Erin's Own	3–16 4–19	Tullaroan	Johnstown; Referee: P O’Reilly

6 September 2025; Group B Round 5	Thomastown	1–25 4–13	Graigue-Ballycallan	Callan; Referee: P Burke

6 September 2025; Group B Round 5	Mullinavat	3–15 2–15	Clara	Inistioge; Referee: O Kenny

=== Finals ===
==== Shield Final ====
14 September 2025; Shield Final	Mullinavat	2–19 0–25 penalties: 2–1	Glenmore	Nowlan Park; Referee: G Quilty

==== League Final ====
14 September 2025; League Final	O'Loughlin Gaels	1–19 0–17	Thomastown	Nowlan Park; Referee: E Maher
