= Donnacha Cody =

Irish hurler (born 1985)

Personal information
- Native name: Donnacha Mac Óda (Irish)
- Born: 24 December 1985 (age 40) Kilkenny, Ireland
- Occupation: Chartered civil engineer
- Height: 6 ft 3 in (191 cm)

Sport
- Sport: Hurling
- Position: Right corner-back
Club
- Years: Club
- James Stephens
Club titles
- Kilkenny titles: 3
- Leinster titles: 2
- All-Ireland Titles: 1
College
- Years: College
- 2004-2008: University College Cork
College titles
- Fitzgibbon titles: 0
Inter-county*
Years	County	Apps (scores)
2006–2008	Kilkenny	3 (0-00)
Inter-county titles
- Leinster titles: 3
- All-Irelands: 3
- NHL: 1
- All Stars: 0
- *Inter County team apps and scores correct as of 17:51, 29 December 2014.

Donnacha Cody (born 24 December 1985) is an Irish former hurler. At club level he played with James Stephens, and also lined out at inter-county level with various Kilkenny teams.

== Career ==
Cody first played hurling as a schoolboy at St Kieran's College in Kilkenny. He was part of the college team that won back-to-back Croke Cup titles after defeat of St Colman's College in 2003 and St Raphael's College in 2004. Cody later lined out with University College Cork in the Fitzgibbon Cup.

At club level, Cody began his career at juvenile and underage levels with James Stephens. He had just won a Kilkenny MHC title in 2003 when he was drafted onto the club's senior team, winning his first Kilkenny SHC medal in 2004. He later won a Leinster Club SHC medal before claiming the ultimate club honour following James Stephens's defeat of Athenry in the 2005 All-Ireland club final. Cody won a second set of Kilkenny and Leinster Club SHC medals the following year when James Stephens retained those titles. He claimed a third and final Kilkenny SHC medal after a defeat of Ballyhale Shamrocks in 2011.

Cody first appeared on the inter-county scene with Kilkenny, as a member of the minor team that won the All-Ireland MHC title after a defeat of Galway in 2003. He subsequently progressed to the under-21 and, after losing the 2005 All-Ireland under-21 final to Galway, Cody claimed a winners' medal in that grade the following year, however, he missed the all-Ireland final defeat of Tipperary through injury.

By that stage, Cody had already joined the senior team, under the management of his father Brian Cody. He was part of the National League and Leinster SHC-winning teams in 2006, however, he was dropped from the team before the All-Ireland SHC victory. Cody was recalled to the senior panel the following year and won further Leinster and All-Ireland SHC medals as a panel member in 2007 and 2008.

== Personal life ==
His father, Brian Cody, won four All-Ireland SHC medals as a player with Kilkenny, before managing the team to 11 All-Ireland SHC titles during his 24 seasons in charge. His mother, Elsie Walsh, played camogie with Wexford. His brother, Diarmuid Cody, was an All-Ireland SHC-winner with Kilkenny in 2015.

== Honours ==
St. Kieran's College

- All-Ireland Colleges Senior Hurling Championship: 2003, 2004
- Leinster Colleges Senior Hurling Championship: 2003, 2004

James Stephens

- All-Ireland Senior Club Hurling Championship: 2005
- Leinster Senior Club Hurling Championship: 2004, 2005
- Kilkenny Senior Hurling Championship: 2004, 2005, 2011
- Kilkenny Minor Hurling Championship: 2003

Kilkenny

- All-Ireland Senior Hurling Championship: 2006, 2007, 2008
- Leinster Senior Hurling Championship: 2006, 2007, 2008
- National Hurling League: 2006
- All-Ireland Minor Hurling Championship: 2003
- Leinster Minor Hurling Championship: 2003
