= 2026 Kilkenny Senior Hurling Championship =

Annual hurling competition season

- Dates: 19 September - 25 October 2026
- Teams: 12
- Sponsor: St Canice's Credit Union
- Champions: Ballyhale Shamrocks (22nd title); Joey Holden (captain); Mark Aylward (manager)
- Runners-up: Tullaroan; Bill Gaffney (captain); David Mulcahy (manager)
- Relegated: Erin's Own

Tournament statistics
- Matches played: 12
- Goals scored: 29 (2.42 per match)
- Points scored: 466 (38.83 per match)
- Top scorer: Ian Byrne (1-23)

The 2026 Kilkenny Senior Hurling Championship was the 132nd staging of the Kilkenny Senior Hurling Championship since its establishment by the Kilkenny County Board in 1887. The championship ran from 19 September to 25 October 2026.

Ballyhale Shamrocks are the defending champions. Erin's Own's relegation brought an end to 18 years of top tier hurling for the club.

The final was played on 25 October 2026 at UPMC Nowlan Park in Kilkenny, between Ballyhale Shamrocks and Tullaroan, in what was their first ever meeting in the final. Ballyhale Shamrocks won the match by 2-24 to 0-08 to claim a 22nd championship title overall and a second consecutive title.

Glenmore's Ian Byrne was the championship's top scorer with 1-23.

== Team changes ==
=== To Championship ===
Promoted from the Kilkenny Intermediate Hurling Championship

- Danesfort

=== From Championship ===
Relegated to the Kilkenny Intermediate Hurling Championship

- Lisdowney

== Results ==
=== First round ===
19 September 2026 First round	Glenmore	5-28 - 3-27 (aet)	Dicksboro	Mullinavat Grounds
	I Byrne (1-14, 11fs); C Kirwan (3-2); D Hartley (1-2); C Beirne, C Phelan (0-2 each); C Roche (0-1, 1f); J Dollard, B Reid, S Murphy, G Aylward, E Phelan (0-1 each)	Report	C Hackett (1-7); S Stapleton (0-9, 9fs); T Clifford (1-5); P Lacey (1-0); J Sheehan, A Clifford (0-2 each); T McPhillips, H Shine, (0-1)

19 September 2026 First round	Clara	1-21 - 2-15	Erin's Own	St Patrick's Grounds
	C O’Shea (0-5, 4fs); D Glynn (1-2); R Glynn (0-4); C Bolger (0-3); J Power, P Cody (0-2 each); J Connolly, M O’Connell, L Ryan (0-1 each)	Report	M Brennan (1-11, 7fs); C Fogarty (1-0); S Feehan (0-2); S Coogan, E Brennan (0-1 each)

20 September 2026 First round	Bennettsbridge	0-23 - 0-14	Danesfort	UPMC Nowlan Park
	N Cleere (0-8, 0-7f); S Morrissey (0-3); L Blanchfield, H O’Neill, E Walpole (0-2 each); A O’Farrell, T Kelly, D Blanchfield, C Murphy, J Lennon, B Nolan (0-1 each).	Report	B Whitty (0-4f); P Hickey (0-3); P Hogan (0-2f); D Dunne (0-2); F Mahony, C Kearney, M Cowley (0-1 each).

20 September 2026 First round	Tullaroan	1-28 - 2-20	Mullinavat	John Locke Park
	S Walsh (0-7, 0-2 frees, 0-1 sideline), D Simpson (0-6, 0-1 frees), M Keoghan (1-3), P Walshe (0-3), B Gaffney (0-2), J Walton (0-2), N Holland (0-2), G Dunne (0-2), C Brennan (0-1).	Report	O Knox (0-9, 0-6 frees), J Walsh (1-4, 1-1 frees), B Phelan (1-0) C Power (0-2), C Duggan (0-2), A Mansfield, M Malone, C Walsh, (0-1 each).

=== Relegation playoff ===
3 October 2026 Playoff	Danesfort	0-19 - 0-16	Erin's Own	Páirc Lachtain
	B Whitty (0-7, 6fs); F Mahony, C Kearney, A Ireland Wall (0-2 each); C O’Neill, S Hayes, P Hickey, D Dunne, P Murphy, A Cowley (0-1 each)	Report	M Brennan (0-6, 4fs); C McMahon (0-4); S Coogan (0-3); E Brennan (0-2); K Buggy (0-1)

=== Quarter-finals ===
26 September 2026 Quarter-final	Graigue–Ballycallan	0-17 - 1-17	Bennettsbridge	UPMC Nowlan Park
	A McEvoy 0-10, J Roberts 0-2, R Corcoran 0-2, S Ryan 0-2, B O'Neill 0-1.	Report	N Cleere 0-5, E Walspole 1-1, C Fitzgerald 0-2, L Blannchfield 0-2, A O'Farrell 0-1, D Blanchfield 0-1, J Harkin 0-1, J Lennon 0-1, S Morrissey 0-1, B Hughes 0-1, B Nolan 0-1.

26 September 2026 Quarter-final	Thomastown	2-25 - 1-19	Clara	UPMC Nowlan Park
	D Barron 2-1, R Donnelly 0-7, L Connellan 0-5, S Donnelly 0-4, J Donnelly 0-3, B Nevin 0-2, P McDonald 0-2, J Holden 0-1.	Report	C O'Shea 0-4, R Glynn 0-4, D Glynn 1-0, C Bolger 0-3, P Cody 0-2 D Langton 0-2, J Connolly 0-1, M O'Connell 0-1, J Power 0-1, L Ryan 0-1.

27 September 2026 Quarter-final	O'Loughlin Gaels	1-19 - 2-20	Tullaroan	UPMC Nowlan Park
	R Sweeney (1-11, 9fs and 1 ‘65); R Buckley, G Kelly (0-1 each); F Mackessy, J Ryan, C Loy, C Byrne (0-1 each)	Report	S Walsh (0-6, 1f and 1’65); M Keoghan (1-3); C Brennan (1-0); D Simpson (0-3, 2fs); B Gaffney, G Dunne (0-3 each); N Holland (0-1, 1f); P Walsh (0-1)

27 September 2026 Quarter-final	Ballyhale Shamrocks	1-20 - 0-18	Glenmore	UPMC Nowlan Park
	A Mullen (0-6); N Shortall (1-1); B Cody (0-4); TJ Reid (0-3, 1f); E Cody, C Coogan (0-2 each); E Shefflin, R Reid (0-1 each)	Report	I Byrne (0-9, 5fs); D Hartley, C Kirwan (0-3 each); J Cody, B Reid, G Aylward (0-1 each)

=== Semi-finals ===
11 October 2026 Semi-final	Bennettsbridge	2-14 - 1-20	Tullaroan	UPMC Nowlan Park
	N Cleere (0-8, 6fs); L Blanchfield (2-0); E Walpole, J Lennon (0-2 each); S Morrissey, T Kelly (0-1 each)	Report	S Walsh (0-9, 8fs); D Simpson (0-5, 2fs); G Dunne (1-1); M Keoghan, B Gaffney (0-2 each); P Walsh (0-1)	Referee: G Quilty

11 October 2026 Semi-final	Ballyhale Shamrocks	1-18 - 1-16	Thomastown	UPMC Nowlan Park
	TJ Reid (0-8, 7fs); N Shortall (1-1); E Cody (0-3); A Mullen (0-2); J Mullen, D Corcoran, C Coogan, L Barron (0-1 each)	Report	R Donnelly (0-7, 5fs and 1 ‘65); J Donnelly (1-2); D Barron (0-3); S Donnelly (0-2); L Connellan, P McDonald (0-1 each)	Referee: C Everard

=== Final ===
25 October 2026 Final	Tullaroan	0-08 - 2-24	Ballyhale Shamrocks	UPMC Nowlan Park
	D Simpson 0-3 (1f, 165), S Walsh 0-2 (0-1f), J Walton 0-1, M Keoghan 0-1, N Holland 0-1 (0-1f).	Report	A Mullen 1-3, TJ Reid 0-5 (3f, 1 65), E Cody 0-4, J Mullen 1-0, E Shefflin 0-3, D Corcoran 0-2, R Corcoran 0-1, N Shortall 0-1, B Cody 0-1, R Reid 0-1, L Barron 0-1, D Aylward 0-1, M Barron 0-1.	Referee: O Beehan (Fenians)

== Championship statistics ==
=== Top scorers ===
Rank	Player	Club	Tally	Total	Matches	Average
1	Ian Byrne	Glenmore	1-23	26	2	12.00
2	Shane Walsh	Tullaroan	0-24	24	4	6.00
3	Nicky Cleere	Bennettsbridge	0-21	21	3	7.00
4	Michael Brennan	Erin's Own	1-17	20	2	10.00
5	Dylan Simpson	Tullaroan	0-17	17	4	4.25
6	T. J. Reid	Ballyhale Shamrocks	0-16	16	3	5.33
7	Martin Keoghan	Tullaroan	2-09	15	4	3.75
8	Ciarán Kirwan	Glenmore	3-05	14	2	7.00
8	Ruarc Sweeney	O'Loughlin Gaels	1-11	14	1	14.00
8	Adrian Mullen	Ballyhale Shamrocks	1-11	14	3	4.66
8	Robbie Donnelly	Thomastown	0-14	14	2	7.00
