= 2016 Kilkenny Senior Hurling Championship =

Annual hurling competition season

- Dates: 24 September 2016 – 30 October 2016
- Teams: 12
- Sponsor: St. Canice's Credit Union
- Champions: O'Loughlin Gaels (4th title); Brian Hogan (captain); Aidan Fogarty (manager)
- Runners-up: Ballyhale Shamrocks
- Relegated: Fenians

Tournament statistics
- Matches played: 15
- Goals scored: 33 (2.2 per match)
- Points scored: 453 (30.2 per match)
- Top scorer(s): Richie Hogan (0-40)

The 2016 Kilkenny Senior Hurling Championship was the 122nd staging of the Kilkenny Senior Hurling Championship since its establishment by the Kilkenny County Board in 1887. The championship began on 24 September 2016 and ended on 30 October 2016.

Clara were the defending champions, however, they were defeated by Ballyhale Shamrocks in the semi-final.

On 30 October 2016, O'Loughlin Gaels won the championship after a 0–19 to 1–12 defeat of Ballyhale Shamrocks in the final. This was their fourth championship title overall and their first since 2010.

Danesfort's Richie Hogan was the championship's top scorer with 0-40.

== Team changes ==
=== To Championship ===
Promoted from the Kilkenny Intermediate Hurling Championship

- Bennettsbridge

=== From Championship ===
Relegated to the Kilkenny Intermediate Hurling Championship

- Carrickshock

== Results ==
=== First round ===
Four of the twelve teams received byes into the quarter-finals. The remaining eight teams played in four matches with the winners progressing into the quarter-finals.

24 September 2016 First round	Danesfort	0-13 - 1-10	Rower-Inistioge	Mullinavat GAA Grounds, Mullinavat
	R Hogan 0-10, C O'Neill 0-1, P Hogan 0-1, B Cullen 0-1.	Report	T Murphy 1-1, D Joyce 0-3, K Joyce 0-2, R Leahy 0-1, P Lyng 0-1, M Grace 0-1, J Cassin 0-1.	Referee: P Burke (Emeralds)

24 September 2016 First round	Clara	1-17 - 2-09	Fenians	Páirc Lachtáin, Freshford
	C Bolger 1-8, C O'Shea 0-4, L Ryan 0-3, J Phelan 0-1, C Prendergast 0-1.		C Tobin 1-4, S Tobin 1-0, D Tobin 0-2, K Grehan 0-1, M Webster 0-1, S Brennan 0-1.	Referee: G Quilty (Slieverue)

25 September 2016 First round	Erin's Own	1-10 - 2-17	James Stephens	Ballyragget GAA Grounds, Ballyragget
	S Buggy 1-6, A Moran 0-1, J Byrne 0-1, M Boran 0-1, C Fogarty 0-1.		D Walton 0-9, L Scanlon 1-2, Donncha Cody 1-0, M Ruth 0-2, E Larkin 0-1, Diarmuid Cody 0-1, J Tyrrell 0-1.	Referee: S Cleere (O'Loughlin Gaels)

25 September 2016 First round	Mullinavat	3-16 - 4-13	Bennettsbridge	Grennan Park, Thomastown
	J Walsh 0-9, G Malone 1-2, J Fennelly 1-0, L Fennelly 1-0, J Gahan 0-3, M Malone 0-1, W O'Dwyer 0-1.		N Cleere 1-10, B Lannon 2-0, L Blanchfield 1-1, E Morrissey 0-1, S Morrissey 0-1.	Referee: E Ryan (Fenians)

1 October 2016 First round replay	Danesfort	2-16 - 1-21 (aet)	Rower-Inistioge	Páirc na Seamróg, Ballyhale
	R Hogan 0-7, C Phelan 1-3, C Treacy 1-0, P Hogan 0-2, R Walsh 0-1, G Tynan 0-1, J Mullally 0-1, C O'Neill 0-1.		D Joyce 0-9, K Murphy 1-2, M Grace 0-5, S Grace 0-3, R Leahy 0-1, C Joyce 0-1.	Referee: M O'Sullivan (Ballyhale Shamrocks)

1 October 2016 First round replay	Mullinavat	2-15 - 0-15	Bennettsbridge	Páirc na Seamróg, Ballyhale
	J Walsh 0-5, W O'Dwyer 0-5, J Fennelly 1-1, G Malone 1-1, T Aylward 0-1, M Malone 0-1, J Gahan 0-1.		N Cleere 0-7, S Morrissey 0-4, A Cleere 0-2, L Blanchfield 0-1, K Blanchfield 0-1.	Referee: P Burke (Emeralds)

=== Relegation play-off ===
22 October 2016 Relegation play-off	Danesfort	0-14 - 0-14	Fenians	Palmerstown Sportsfield, Kilkenny
	R Hogan 0-10 (0-8f, 1'65), T Whitty and P Hickey 0-2 each	Report	M Webster 0-10f, C Tobin 0-2 (0-1f), K Grehan and D Tobin 0-1 each

29 October 2016 Relegation play-off replay	Danesfort	1-18 - 1-12	Fenians	Palmerstown Sportsfield, Kilkenny
	R Hogan 0-13 (0-8f), J Mullally 1-2, C Phelan, P Hickey, R Walsh 0-1 each	Report	C Tobin 1-2 (1-0 pen, 0-1f), M Webster (0-4f), S Tobin and D Tobin 0-2 each, K Grehan 0-1, W Brennan (1'65)

=== Quarter-finals ===
The four teams who received byes in the first round played the four winners from the first round.

8 October 2016 Quarter-final	Ballyhale Shamrocks	3-20 - 1-11	Mullinavat	Grennan Park, Thomastown
	TJ Reid 1-7 (0-2f, 1 sl), E Reid 1-2, B Cody 1-2, R Corcoran 0-4, H Shefflin 0-2, R Reid, C Fennelly, P Mullen 0-1 each		J Walsh 1-4 (0-2f), M Mansfield and W O'Dwyer 0-2 each, Mi Malone, G Malone, M Jones 0-1 each

8 October 2016 Quarter-final	St. Martin's	0-12 - 2-19	Rower-Inistioge	Bennettsbridge Sportsfield
	J Maher 0-5f, C McGrath 0-3f, J Mulhall, S Kinsella, O Walsh, R Reid 0-1 each		D Joyce 1-6 (0-6f), T Murphy 1-2, R Leahy 0-4, K Murphy 0-3, C Joyce, E Doyle, S Grace, K Joyce (0-1f) 0-1 each

9 October 2016 Quarter-final	O'Loughlin Gaels	1-16 - 0-14	James Stephens	Nowlan Park, Kilkenny
	M Bergin 0-6 (0-4f), S Johnson 1-1, M Kelly 0-4, P Deegan 0-2, M Comerford, A Geoghegan, P Butler 0-1 each		D Walton 0-8 (0-6f), L Scanlon 0-4, E Larkin and D Cody 0-1 each

9 October 2016 Quarter-final	Dicksboro	0-12 - 1-24	Clara	Nowlan Park, Kilkenny
	M Gaffney 0-5 (0-3f, 1 '65), A Gaffney 0-2f, P O'Flynn 0-2, O Wash, C Doheny, K Kenny 0-1 each		C Bolger 1-7 (0-4f), L Ryan 0-5 (0-1f, 1 sl), J Murphy, A Murphy, J Langton 0-2 each, T Ryan, D Langton, J Byrne, N Prendergast, J Phelan, J Nolan 0-1 each

=== Semi-finals ===
16 October 2016 Semi-final	Ballyhale Shamrocks	0-19 - 0-16	Clara	Nowlan Park, Kilkenny
	TJ Reid 0-9 (0-5f), C Fennelly 0-4, H Shefflin 0-3 (0-1f), R Corcoran, R Reid, E Reid 0-1 each		C Bolger 0-9 (0-7f, 1 '65), L Ryan (0-1f), L Ryan, C Prendergast, J Langton, C O'Shea, J Byrne, N Prendergast 0-1 each.

16 October 2016 Semi-final	Rower-Inistioge	0-16 - 2-13	O'Loughlin Gaels	Nowlan Park, Kilkenny
	D Joyce 0-10 (0-7f, 1 '65), P Lyng 0-3, M Grace, C Joyce, K Murphy 0-1 each		M Comerford 1-3, M Bergin 0-5 (0-3f), A Geoghegan 1-0, M Kelly 0-3, P Butler and S Bolger 0-1 each

=== Final ===
30 October 2016 Final	O'Loughlin Gaels	0-19 - 1-12	Ballyhale Shamrocks	Nowlan Park, Kilkenny
	M Bergin (0-11, 0-10f, '65), D Loughnane, M Comerford (0-2 each), P Butler, P Deegan, S Johnston, S Bolger (0-1 each).	Report	TJ Reid (1-5, 0-3f), B Aylward, M Aylward, H Shefflin, C Fennelly, E Reid, P Reid, P Mullen (0-1 each).

== Championship statistics ==
=== Top scorers ===
Top scorers overall

Rank	Player	Club	Tally	Total	Matches	Average
1	Richie Hogan	Danesfort	0-40	40	4	10.00
2	Darragh Joyce	Rower-Inistioge	1-28	31	4	7.75
3	Chris Bolger	Clara	2-24	30	4	7.50
4	T. J. Reid	Ballyhale Shamrocks	2-21	27	3	9.00
5	Mark Bergin	O'Loughlin Gaels	0-22	22	3	7.33
6	John Walsh	Mullinavat	1-18	21	3	7.00
7	Nicky Cleere	Bennettsbridge	1-17	20	2	10.00
8	David Walton	James Stephens	0-17	17	2	8.50
9	Mark Webster	Fenians	0-15	15	3	5.00
10	Conor Tobin	Fenians	2-08	14	3	4.66

Top scorers in a single game

Rank	Player	Club	Tally	Total	Opposition
1	Nicky Cleere	Bennettsbridge	1-10	13	Mullinavat
1	Richie Hogan	Danesfort	0-13	13	Fenians
2	Chris Bolger	Clara	1-08	11	Fenians
2	Mark Bergin	O'Loughlin Gaels	0-11	11	Ballyhale Shamrocks
3	Chris Bolger	Clara	1-07	10	Dicksboro
3	T. J. Reid	Ballyhale Shamrocks	1-07	10	Mullinavat
3	Richie Hogan	Danesfort	0-13	13	Rower-Inistioge
3	Mark Webster	Fenians	0-10	10	Danesfort
3	Richie Hogan	Danesfort	0-10	10	Fenians
3	Darragh Joyce	Rower-Inistioge	0-10	10	O'Loughlin Gaels
