= 2001 Kilkenny Intermediate Hurling Championship =

- Teams: 12
- Champions: Mullinavat (2nd title); Maurice Murphy (captain)
- Runners-up: Clara; Rory Moore (captain)

The 2001 Kilkenny Intermediate Hurling Championship was the 37th staging of the Kilkenny Intermediate Hurling Championship since its establishment by the Kilkenny County Board in 1929.

The final, a replay, was played on 21 October 2001 at Nowlan Park in Kilkenny, between Mullinavat and Clara, in what was their first ever meeting in the final. Mullinavat won the match by 2–10 to 2–07 to claim their second championship title overall and a first championship title in 12 years.

== Results ==
=== Final ===
7 October 2001 Final	Mullinavat	1-05 - 1-05	Clara	Nowlan Park
	W O'Dwyer 1-1, M Dunphy 0-3, A McGovern 0-1.		J Fitzgerald 1-0, G Prendergast 0-3, R Moore 0-1, R Shortall 0-1.

=== Final replay ===
21 October 2001 Final replay	Mullinavat	2-10 - 2-07	Clara	Nowlan Park
	M Dunphy 0-7, Michael Murphy 1-0, Maurice Murphy 1-0, W Bourke 0-1, A McGovern 0-1, S Holden 0-1.		G Byrne 1-4, R Shortall 1-0, G Prendergast 0-2, J Fitzgerald 0-1.
