= Diarmuid Cody =

Irish hurler (born 1994)

Personal information
- Native name: Diarmuid Mac Óda (Irish)
- Born: 1994 (age 31–32) Kilkenny, Ireland
- Occupation: Engineer

Sport
- Sport: Hurling
- Position: Left wing-back
Club
- Years: Club
- 2011-present: James Stephens
Club titles
- Kilkenny titles: 1
College
- Years: College
- 2014-2017: Cork Institute of Technology
College titles
- Fitzgibbon titles: 0
Inter-county
- Years: County
- 2015-2016: Kilkenny
Inter-county titles
- Leinster titles: 2
- All-Irelands: 1
- NHL: 0
- All Stars: 0

Diarmuid Cody (born 1994) is an Irish hurler. At club level he plays with James Stephens, and has also lined out at inter-county level with various Kilkenny teams.

== Career ==
Cody first played hurling as a schoolboy at St Kieran's College in Kilkenny. He was part of the college team that won back-to-back Leinster Colleges SHC titles in 2011 and 2012, while he also claimed a Croke Cup medal after a defeat of Ardscoil Rís in 2011. Cody later lined out with Cork Institute of Technology in the Fitzgibbon Cup.

At club level, Cody began his career at juvenile and underage levels with James Stephens. He was still eligible for the minor grade when he won a Kilkenny SHC after a defeat of Ballyhale Shamrocks in 2011. Cody added a Kilkenny MHC medal to his collection the following year. He has also served as senior team captain.

Cody first appeared on the inter-county scene with Kilkenny during an unsuccessful two-year stint with the minor team in 2011 and 2012. He later progressed to the under-21 team where his tenure was equally unsuccessful.

By that stage, Cody's under-21 performances had resulted in a call-up to the senior team training panel in 2015. He won a set of Leinster SHC and All-Ireland SHC medals as a non-playing substitute later that season. Cody once again claimed a Leinster SHC medal as a non-playing substitute in 2016, before suffering All-Ireland final defeat by Tipperary.

== Personal life ==
His father, Brian Cody, won four All-Ireland SHC medals as a player with Kilkenny, before managing the team to 11 All-Ireland SHC titles during his 24 seasons in charge. His mother, Elsie Walsh, played camogie with Wexford. His brother, Donnacha Cody, was part of the Kilkenny team that won three successive All-Ireland SHC titles between 2006 and 2008.

== Honours ==
St Kieran's College

- All-Ireland Colleges Senior Hurling Championship: 2011
- Leinster Colleges Senior Hurling Championship: 2011, 2012

James Stephens

- Kilkenny Senior Hurling Championship: 2011
- Kilkenny Minor Hurling Championship: 2012

Kilkenny

- All-Ireland Senior Hurling Championship: 2015
- Leinster Senior Hurling Championship: 2015, 2016
