= Niall Brassil =

Irish hurler

Personal information
- Native name: Niall Ó Breasail (Irish)
- Born: 25 March 1999 (age 27) Kilkenny, Ireland
- Occupation: Student

Sport
- Sport: Hurling
- Position: Left corner-forward
Club
- Years: Club
- James Stephens
Club titles
- Kilkenny titles: 0
College
- Years: College
- 2017-present: Institute of Technology, Carlow
College titles
- Fitzgibbon titles: 0
Inter-county*
Years	County	Apps (scores)
2018-present	Kilkenny	0 (0-00)
Inter-county titles
- Leinster titles: 0
- All-Irelands: 0
- NHL: 0
- All Stars: 0
- *Inter County team apps and scores correct as of 14:15, 26 January 2020.

Niall Brassil (born 25 March 1999) is an Irish hurler who plays for Kilkenny Senior Championship club James Stephens and at inter-county level with the Kilkenny senior hurling team. He usually lines out as a left corner-forward.

== Honours ==
James Stephens

- Kilkenny Senior Hurling League (1): 2018

Kilkenny

- Leinster Under-20 Hurling Championship (1): 2019
- Leinster Minor Hurling Championship (1): 2017
