= 2015 Kilkenny Senior Hurling Championship =

Annual hurling competition season

- Dates: 19 September 2015 – 25 October 2015
- Teams: 12
- Sponsor: St. Canice's Credit Union
- Champions: Clara (3rd title); Keith Hogan (captain); Mick Purcell (manager)
- Runners-up: O'Loughlin Gaels; Martin Comerford (captain); Aidan Fogarty (manager)
- Relegated: Carrickshock

Tournament statistics
- Matches played: 13
- Goals scored: 24 (1.85 per match)
- Points scored: 379 (29.15 per match)

The 2015 Kilkenny Senior Hurling Championship was the 121st staging of the Kilkenny Senior Hurling Championship since its establishment in by the Kilkenny County Board in 1887. The championship began on 19 September 2015 and ended on 25 October 2015.

Ballyhale Shamrocks were the defending champions, however, they were defeated by O'Loughlin Gaels in the semi-final.

On 25 October 2015, Clara won the championship following a 2–12 to 1–13 defeat of O'Loughlin Gaels. This was their third championship title, their first in two championship seasons.

== Team changes ==
=== To Championship ===
Promoted from the Kilkenny Intermediate Hurling Championship

- Mullinavat

=== From Championship ===
Relegated to the Kilkenny Intermediate Hurling Championship

- Tullaroan

== Results ==
=== First round ===
19 September 2015 First round	James Stephens	0-18 - 0-20	Ballyhale Shamrocks	Thomastown Sportsfield
14:00				Referee: G Quilty

19 September 2015 First round	Mullinavat	2-16 - 1-13	Carrickshock	Mooncoin GAA Complex
15:30	M Mansfield (0-6, 0-5frees), I Duggan (1-2), G Malone (1-1), J Gahan (0-3), J Fennelly (0-3), D Butler (0-1).		J Power (0-5, 0-3 Frees, 0-1 ‘65), K Farrell (0-3, 0-2 frees) J Butler (1-0), R Power (0-1), S Power (0-1), M Rohan (0-1), B Donovan (0-1), J Murphy (0-1).	Referee: E Crowley

19 September 2015 First round	Dicksboro	1-20 - 2-17	Danesfort	Páirc Shéamuis Stíophán
17:30				Referee: P Neary

20 September 2015 First round	Erin's Own	0-16 - 0-12	St. Martin's	Nowlan Park
12:00				Referee: S Cleere

26 September 2015 First round replay	Dicksboro	0-15 - 1-8	Danesfort	Páirc Shéamuis Stíophán
14:00				Referee: P Burke

=== Relegation play-off ===
3 October 2015 Play-off	Carrickshock	0-13 - 2-13	St. Martin's	Nowlan Park

=== Quarter-finals ===
26 September 2015 Quarter-final	Clara	0-12 - 1-5	Erin's Own	Páirc Lactáin
16:30				Referee: P Bowden

27 September 2015 Quarter-final	Fenians	0-16 - 3-17	Ballyhale Shamrocks	Tom Ryall Park
14:00				Referee: G Rafter

27 September 2015 Quarter-final	Rower-Inistioge	0-12 - 0-18	Mullinavat	Thomastown Sportsfield
17:00				Referee: S Cleere

3 October 2015 Quarter-final	O'Loughlin Gaels	2-15 - 1-13	Dicksboro	Páirc Shéamuis Stíophán
	M Bergin 0-7.

=== Semi-finals ===
11 October 2015 Semi-final	Ballyhale Shamrocks	2-13 - 2-15	O'Loughlin Gaels	Nowlan Park
	H Shefflin (0-8, 0-6 frees), TJ Reid, (1-2, 0-1 free), B Aylward (1-0), J Fitzpatrick, C Fennelly, M Aylward (0-1 each).	Report	M Bergin (1-9, 0-6 frees), M Kelly (1-1), M Comerford (0-3), D Burke and J Nolan (0-1).

11 October 2015 Semi-final	Mullinavat	0-14 - 1-23	Clara	Nowlan Park
	M Mansfield (0-8, 0-3 frees, 0-1 65, 0-1 sideline), J Gahan (0-2), I Duggan, W O’Dwyer, G Malone, M Jones (0-1 each).	Report	K Hogan (1-5, 0-2 frees, 0-1 65), Liam Ryan and Lester Ryan (0-6 each), J Murphy, C O’Shea (0-2 each), D Langton, J Byrne (0-1 each).

=== Final ===
25 October 2015 Final	O'Loughlin Gaels	1-13 - 2-12	Clara	Nowlan Park
	M Bergin 0-8 (7f), D Loughnane 1-0, D Burke, J Nolan, M Comerford, S Johnston, S Murphy (f) 0-1 each.	Report	C O'Shea 1-2, Liam Ryan 0-4, C Prendergast 1-0, K Hogan 0-3 (2f), D Langton, Lester Ryan, C Bolger 0-1 each.	Attendance: 7,217; Referee: P Burke

== Championship Statistics ==
=== Miscellaneous ===
- The final between Clara and O'Loughlin Gaels presented a rare occasion when a set of brothers lined out on opposing teams. Brian Hogan was at centre-back for O'Loughlin Gaels, while his brother, Keith Hogan, captained the Clara team from centre-forward. During the course of the game the two brothers marked each other.
