= 2025 Kilkenny Senior Hurling Championship =

Annual hurling competition season

- Dates: 13 September - 26 October 2025
- Teams: 12
- Sponsor: St Canice's Credit Union
- Champions: Ballyhale Shamrocks (21st title); T. J. Reid (captain); Henry Shefflin (manager)
- Runners-up: O'Loughlin Gaels; Brian Hogan (manager)

Tournament statistics
- Matches played: 12
- Goals scored: 38 (3.17 per match)
- Points scored: 449 (37.42 per match)
- Top scorer(s): T. J. Reid (0-40)

The 2025 Kilkenny Senior Hurling Championship was the 131st staging of the Kilkenny Senior Hurling Championship since its establishment by the Kilkenny County Board in 1887. The championship ran from 12 September to 26 October 2025.

Thomastown entered the championship as the defending champions, however, they were beaten by Balyhale Shamrocks in the quarter-finals.

The final was played on 26 October 2025 at UPMC Nowlan Park in Kilkenny, between Ballyhale Shamrocks and O'Loughlin Gaels, in what was their fourth meeting in the final overall. Ballyhale Shamrocks won the match by 1-18 to 0-12 to claim a record 21st championship title overall and a first title in three years.

T. J. Reid was the championship's top scorer with 0-40.

== Team changes ==
=== To Championship ===
Promoted from the Kilkenny Intermediate Hurling Championship

- Lisdowney

=== From Championship ===
Relegated to the Kilkenny Intermediate Hurling Championship

- James Stephens

== Fixtures/results ==
=== First round ===
13 September 2025 First round	Lisdowney	3-21 - 2-27	Clara	Canon Kearns Park
	B Kavanagh 1-11, K Sweeney 0-3, R McEvoy 1-0, A Tallis 1-0, S Phelan 0-2, W Kenny 0-2, M Kenny 0-1, N Brennan 0-1, L Holohan 0-1.		J Bergin 0-12, C Hoyne 0-6, C Bolger 1-2, R Glynn 1-1, L Ryan 0-3, D Glynn 0-2, L Ryan 0-1.

13 September 2025 First round	Dicksboro	2-15 - 1-14	Graigue–Ballycallan	Páirc Lachtain
	S Stapleton (1-9, 0-5 frees), T Clifford (1-2), C Hackett (0-2), L Moore (0-1), E Moylan (0-1).	Report	B Ryan (1-1, 1-0 free); S Ryan (0-3 frees); A McEvoy (0-3), B O’Neill (0-3 frees), S Keoghan (0-1), R Corcoran (0-1), J Roberts (0-1), E Cahill (0-1).

13 September 2025 First round	Erin's Own	2-08 - 1-32	Ballyhale Shamrocks	St John's Park
	C McMahon (1-2, 2fs); D Coogan (1-0); J Buggy (0-3, 2fs); M Brennan (0-2); E Brennan (0-1)		TJ Reid (0-9, 8fs); B Cody (1-2); N Shortall (0-5); S Barron, E Cody, E Kenneally (0-3 each); D Corcoran (0-2); R Corcoran, L Barron, E Shefflin, A Mullen, F Shefflin (0-1 each)

14 September 2025 First round	Tullaroan	0-25 - 2-21	Bennettsbridge	Canon Kearns Park
	S Walsh 0-9, C Russell 0-4, M Keoghan 0-3, D Simpson 0-3, C Brennan 0-2, T Dunne 0-1, B Gaffney 0-1, P Walsh 0-1, N Holland 0-1.		J Hughes 0-8, K Blanchfield 1-5, D Blanchfield 1-1, H O'Neill 0-2, L Blanchfield 0-2, J Harkin 0-1, S Morrissey 0-1, N Cleere 0-1.

=== Relegation playoff ===
4 October 2025 Relegation playoff	Lisdowney	1-10 - 3-18	Graigue–Ballycallan	Páirc Lachtáin
	E Kenny (1-0); B Kavanagh (0-3, 3fs); K Sweeney (0-3); L Dunphy (0-2); W Kenny, N Brennan (0-1 each)	Report	B Ryan (2-1); S Ryan (0-5, 5fs); T Ronan (0-4); C Flynn (1-1); T Dunphy (0-2); B O'Neill, J Neary, J Roberts, R Corcoran, S Butler (0-1 each)

=== Quarter-finals ===
27 September 2025 Quarter-final	Glenmore	2-18 - 2-24	Dicksboro	UPMC Nowlan Park
	I Byrne (0-11, 8fs); C Beirne, C Kirwan (1-1 each); C Phelan (0-2); G Aylward, A Murphy, D Hartley (0-1 each)	Report	S Stapleton (1-4, 3fs); L Moore (1-4); T Clifford (0-5); P Lacey (0-4, 2fs); C Hackett (0-3); O Walsh, J Sheehan, C Buckley, E Cody (0-1 each)

27 September 2025 Quarter-final	Mullinavat	2-22 - 3-16	Bennettsbridge	UPMC Nowlan Park
	J Walsh 1-12, M Malone 1-0, A Mansfield 0-2, J Gahan 0-2, G O'Connor 0-1, P Dempsey 0-1, I Duggan 0-1, C Walsh 0-1, P Gahan 0-1, G Malone 0-1.	Report	J Hughes 1-8, N Cleere 1-0, C Brennan 1-0, D Blanchfield 0-2, S Morrissey 0-2, L Blanchfield 0-1, H O'Neill 0-1, J Harkin 0-1, T Kelly 0-1.

28 September 2025 Quarter-final	Thomastown	0-16 - 1-22	Ballyhale Shamrocks	UPMC Nowlan Park
	R Donnelly (0-9, 7fs and 1 ‘65); L Connellan (0-2); C Treacy, S Donnelly, P McDonald, A Cass, N Dempsey (0-1 each)	Report	TJ Reid (0-10, 6fs); B Cody (0-5); N Shortall (1-1); E Cody (0-3); L Barron, D Corcoran, A Mullen (0-1 each)

28 September 2025 Quarter-final	O'Loughlin Gaels	3-20 - 3-17	Clara	UPMC Nowlan Park
	M Bergin (0-7, 0-5 frees); C Kelly (1-3, 0-1 free); F Mackessy (1-2); O Wall (1-0); J Nolan, E O’Shea (0-2, each); P Deegan, J Molloy, L Hogan, C Heary (0-1, each).	Report	J Bergin (0-9, 0-8 frees); C Bolger (2-0); D Glynn (1-0); J Power (0-3); C Hoyne (0-2); R Glynn, P Cody, C O’Shea (0-1, each).

=== Semi-finals ===
12 October 2025 Semi-final	Mullinavat	2-16 - 1-20	O'Loughlin Gaels	UPMC Nowlan Park
	J Walsh (1-9, 8fs); M Malone (1-1); G Malone, J Gahan (0-2 each); B Phelan, A Mansfield (0-1 each)	Report	M Bergin (0-8, 4fs and 1 '65); F Mackessy (0-4, 1f); O Wall (1-0); L Hogan (0-3); R Buckley (0-2); J Nolan, C Kelly, J Molloy (0-1 each)

12 October 2025 Semi-final	Dicksboro	1-16 - 0-21	Ballyhale Shamrocks	UPMC Nowlan Park
	P Lacey (0-4, 2fs); C Hackett (0-4); L Moore (1-1); S Stapleton (0-2, 1f); T Clifford (0-2); K Moore, M Kelleher, E Moylan (0-1 each)	Report	TJ Reid (0-10, 8fs); A Mullen (0-4); E Cody (0-3); R Reid, E Kenneally, B Cody, N Shortall (0-1 each)

=== Final ===
26 October 2025 Final	O'Loughlin Gaels	0-12 - 1-18	Ballyhale Shamrocks	UPMC Nowlan Park
	M Bergin (0-4 frees); F Mackessy (0-3, 2 frees); J Molloy, O Wall C Heary, M Butler (all 0-1), C Kelly (0-1 free).	Report	TJ Reid (0-11, 0-6 frees, 0-2 ‘65s, 0-1 sideline) E Cody (1-1); R Reid (0-2); D Corcoran, R Corcoran, L Barron, N Shortall (all 0-1).	Referee: C Everard

== Championship statistics ==
=== Top scorers ===
Rank	Player	Club	Tally	Total	Matches	Average
1	T. J. Reid	Ballyhale Shamrocks	0-40	40	4	10.00
2	John Walsh	Mullinavat	2-21	27	2	13.50
3	Shane Stapleton	Dicksboro	2-15	21	3	7.00
3	James Bergin	Clara	0-21	21	2	10.50
5	James Hughes	Bennettsbridge	1-16	19	2	9.50
5	Mark Bergin	O'Loughlin Gaels	0-19	19	3	6.33
7	Brian Kavanagh	Lisdowney	1-14	17	2	8.50
8	Eoin Cody	Ballyhale Shamrocks	1-10	13	4	3.25
9	Liam Moore	Dicksboro GAA	2-06	12	3	4.00
9	Timmy Clifford	Dicksboro	1-09	12	3	4.00
9	Fionán Mackessy	O'Loughlin Gaels	1-09	12	3	4.00
