= 2022 Kilkenny Senior Hurling Championship =

Annual hurling competition season

- Dates: 17 September - 16 October 2022
- Teams: 12
- Sponsor: St. Canice's Credit Union
- Champions: Ballyhale Shamrocks (20th title); Ronan Corcoran (captain); Pat Hoban (manager)
- Runners-up: James Stephens; Diarmuid Cody (captain); Séamus Dwyer (manager)
- Relegated: Lisdowney

Tournament statistics
- Matches played: 12
- Goals scored: 27 (2.25 per match)
- Points scored: 426 (35.5 per match)
- Top scorer(s): Niall Brassil (0-41)

The 2022 Kilkenny Senior Hurling Championship was the 128th staging of the Kilkenny Senior Hurling Championship since its establishment by the Kilkenny County Board in 1887. The championship ran from 17 September to 16 October 2022.

Ballyhale Shamrocks entered the championship as the defending champions and will be hoping to secure a fifth consecutive title.

The final was played on 16 October 2022 at UPMC Nowlan Park in Kilkenny, between Ballyhale Shamrocks and James Stephens, in what was their first meeting in the final in three years. Ballyhale Shamrocks won the match by 1–21 to 2–11 to claim a record-equalling 20th championship title overall and a record-breaking fifth successive title.

Niall Brassil was the championship's top scorer with 0-41.

== Team changes ==
=== To Championship ===
Promoted from the Kilkenny Intermediate Hurling Championship

- Glenmore

=== From Championship ===
Relegated to the Kilkenny Intermediate Hurling Championship

- Rower-Inistioge

== Results ==
=== First round ===
17 September 2022 First round	O'Loughlin Gaels	1-14 - 3-09	Mullinavat	Páirc na Seamróg
	M Bergin 0-10, C Kelly 1-2, P Deegan 0-2.		I Duggan 1-3, J Walsh 0-5, G Malone 1-0, L Fennelly 1-0, W O'Dwyer 0-1.

18 September 2022 First round	James Stephens	1-24 - 2-14	Lisdowney	St. Patrick's Park
	N Brassil 0-15, T O'Dwyer 1-2, L Scanlon 0-2, A Parsons 0-2, R Whelan 0-1, C Browne 0-1, M Ruth 0-1.		D O'Carroll 2-0, B Kavanagh 0-6, K Sweeney 0-3, M Kenny 0-2, N Brennan 0-1, C Jordan 0-1, E Kenny 0-1.	Referee: D Hughes (Barrow Rangers)

18 September 2022 First round	Erin's Own	1-20 - 0-11	Graigue-Ballycallan	Páirc Lachtain
	J Buggy 0-6, J Holohan 1-0, C Fogarty 0-3, E Brennan 0-3, J Brennan 0-2, C McMahon 0-2, S Coogan 0-1, S Daly 0-1, J Dowd 0-1, D Brennan 0-1.		S Ryan 0-5, B Ryan 0-2, T Dunphy 0-2, C Prendeville 0-1, C Hoyne 0-1.	Referee: O Behan (Fenians)

18 September 2022 First round	Ballyhale Shamrocks	3-26 - 0-20	Glenmore	UPMC Nowlan Park
	E Cody 1-6, A Mullen 1-4, TJ Reid 0-6, N Shortall 1-1, R Corcoran 0-3, E Shefflin 0-2, P Mullen 0-2, D Corcoran 0-1, E Kenneally 0-1.		A Murphy 0-9, L Hennessy 0-3, B Reid 0-2, G Aylward 0-2, M Aylward 0-1, E Phelan 0-1, S Murphy 0-1, C Roche 0-1.	Referee: S Cleere (O'Loughlin Gaels)

=== Relegation playoff ===
1 October 2022 Playoff	Lisdowney	1-14 - 0-21	Graigue-Ballycallan	Páirc Lachtain
	A Tallis 1-2, B Kavanagh 0-4, M Kenny 0-2, E Walsh 0-2, N Brennan 0-2, C Jordan 0-1, K Sweeney 0-1.		S Ryan 0-7, T Ronan 0-4, S Butler 0-4, T Dunphy 0-2, C Prendeville 0-1, A Brennan 0-1, B Ryan 0-1, J Roberts 0-1.

=== Quarter-finals ===
24 September 2022 Quarter-final	Bennettsbridge	1-15 - 1-20	James Stephens	UPMC Nowlan Park
	N Cleere (1-11, 0-7 frees, 0-3 65s); H O’Neill (0-2); K Blanchfield, C Brennan (0-1 each).	Report	N Brassil (0-12, 0-11 frees); T O’Dwyer (1-1); L Scanlon (0-3); A Parsons, E Guilfoyle, L Scanlon (0-2 each); M Ruth (0-1).	Referee: J Kennedy (Shamrocks)

24 September 2022 Quarter-final	Tullaroan	0-18 - 0-15	Erin's Own	UPMC Nowlan Park
	S Walsh 0-12, B Gaffney 0-1, G Dunne 0-1, M Keoghan 0-1, J Walton 0-1, T Dunne 0-1, P Walsh 0-1.		J Buggy 0-9, C Fogarty 0-3, E Brennan 0-2, C Feehan 0-1.	Referee: M O'Sullivan (Ballyhale Shamrocks)

25 September 2022 Quarter-final	Dicksboro	3-19 - 1-11	Mullinavat	UPMC Nowlan Park
	A Gaffney (1-13, seven frees, one 65), T Clifford (1-2), L Moore (1-1), B Sheehan (0-2), H Shine (0-1)	Report	J Walsh (1-7, six frees, one 65), G Malone, P Dempsey (0-2 each).	Referee: C Everard

2 October 2022 Quarter-final	Clara	0-15 - 1-27	Ballyhale Shamrocks	UPMC Nowlan Park
	J Byrne (0-4, 0-4f), L Ryan (0-4), J Murphy, C O'Shea (0-2 each), C Bolger, M Kenny, D Langton (0-1 each).	Report	A Mullen (1-7), E Cody (0-6), TJ Reid (0-6, 0-4f and 0-1 65), Darragh Corcoran, Colin Fennelly (0-3 each), Evan Shefflin, Paddy Mullen (0-1 each)	Referee: P Burke

=== Semi-finals ===
2 October 2022 Semi-final	James Stephens	2-18 - 1-18	Dicksboro	UPMC Nowlan Park
	N Brassil (0-9, 0-7f), E Guilfoyle (1-1), C Browne (1-0), L Scanlon, T O'Dwyer, A Parsons (0-2 each), W Spencer, M Ruth (0-1 each)	Report	A Gaffney (1-8, 0-5f, 0-3 65's), L Moore, B Sheehan (0-3 each), T Clifford (0-2), E Fennelly, H Shine (0-1 each)	Referee: R Byrne

8 October 2022 Semi-final	Tullaroan	1-20 - 1-24	Ballyhale Shamrocks	UPMC Nowlan Park
	S Walsh (0-10, 0-7f), M Keoghan (1-2), D Simpson (0-4), B Gaffney (0-2), Padraig Walsh, Peter Walsh (0-1 each)	Report	TJ Reid (0-11, 0-8f), C Fennelly (1-3), E Cody (0-3), J Cuddihy, E Shefflin (0-2 each), N Shortall, E Kenneally, R Corcoran (0-1 each)

=== Final ===
16 October 2022 Final	James Stephens	2-11 - 1-21	Ballyhale Shamrocks	UPMC Nowlan Park
	E Guilfoyle 1-0, T O'Dwyer 0-2, N Brassil 0-5 (2f), W Spencer 0-1, A Parsons 0-1, C Browne 1-1, C Kenny 0-1	Report	TJ Reid 0-6 (3f, 0-1 '65), E Cody 0-3, C Fennelly 0-3, J Cuddihy 1-2, R Corcoran 0-1, R Reid 0-1, A Mullen 0-1, E Shefflin 0-1, D Corcoran 0-2, N Shortall 0-	Referee: C Everard (Graigue-Ballycallan)

== Championship statistics ==
=== Top scorers ===
Overall

Rank	Player	Club	Tally	Total	Matches	Average
1	Niall Brassil	James Stephens	0-41	41	4	10.25
2	T. J. Reid	Ballyhale Shamrocks	0-29	29	4	7.25
3	Andrew Gaffney	Dicksboro	2-21	27	2	13.50
4	Shane Walsh	Tullaroan	0-22	22	2	11.00
5	Eoin Cody	Ballyhale Shamrocks	1-18	21	4	5.25
6	Adrian Mullen	Ballyhale Shamrocks	2-12	18	4	4.50
7	John Walsh	Mullinavat	1-12	15	2	7.50
7	Jack Buggy	Erin's Own	0-15	15	2	7.50
9	Nicky Cleere	Bennettsbridge	1-11	14	1	14.00
10	Tadhg O'Dwyer	James Stephens	2-07	13	4	3.25

In a single game

Rank	Player	Club	Tally	Total	Opposition
1	Andrew Gaffney	Dicksboro	1-13	16	Mullinavat
2	Niall Brassil	James Stephens	0-15	15	Lisdowney
3	Nicky Cleere	Bennettsbridge	1-11	14	James Stephens
4	Niall Brassil	James Stephens	0-12	12	Bennettsbridge
4	Shane Walsh	Tullaroan	0-12	12	Erin's Own
6	Andrew Gaffney	Dicksboro	1-08	11	James Stephens
7	John Walsh	Mullinavat	1-07	10	Dicksboro
7	Adrian Mullen	Ballyhale Shamrocks	1-07	10	Clara
7	Mark Bergin	O'Loughlin Gaels	0-10	10	Mullinavat
10	Eoin Cody	Ballyhale Shamrocks	1-06	9	Glenmore
10	Alan Murphy	Glenmore	0-09	9	Ballyhale Shamrocks
10	Jack Buggy	Erin's Own	0-09	9	Tullaroan
10	Niall Brassil	James Stephens	0-09	9	Dicksboro

=== Miscellaneous ===
- Glenmore's first round game against Ballyhale Shamrocks was the club's first senior game in 17 years.
