= Kilkenny Senior Hurling League =

- Current season or competition: 2025 Kilkenny Senior Hurling League
- Irish: Sraith Iomána Sinsear Chill Chainnigh
- Code: Hurling
- Founded: 1992; 34 years ago
- Region: Kilkenny (GAA)
- Trophy: Matty Power Cup
- No. of teams: 12
- Title holders: O'Loughlin Gaels (3rd title)
- First winner: Ballyhale Shamrocks
- Most titles: Ballyhale Shamrocks (7 titles)
- Sponsors: St. Canice's Credit Union
- Official website: Official website

The Kilkenny Senior Hurling League (known for sponsorship reasons as the St. Canice's Credit Union Senior Hurling League) is an annual hurling competition organised by the Kilkenny County Board of the Gaelic Athletic Association since 1992 for the top hurling teams in the county of Kilkenny in Ireland.

The series of games are played over the summer and autumn months with the league final currently being played at Nowlan Park in September. The prize for the winning team is the Matty Power Cup.

The league has 12 teams divided into two groups with six teams in each group. Each team in each group plays each other once with the top team in each group progressing to the final. Promotion and relegation between the senior league and lower leagues are a central feature, while a team's finishing position in the league impacts on the subsequent Kilkenny Senior Championship.

The title has been won at least once by 12 different teams. The all-time record-holders are Ballyhale Shamrocks, who have won a total of seven titles.

O'Loughlin Gaels are the current title-holders following their defeat of Thomastown in the 2025 final.

== Sponsorship ==
Since 1992 the Kilkenny Senior Hurling League has been sponsored by the St. Canice's Credit Union.

== Trophy ==
The winning team is presented with the Matty Power Cup. A native of Graiguenamanagh, Matty Power (1899-1965) played hurling for Dicksboro and Garda. He won five All-Ireland medals with Kilkenny and Dublin.

== Roll of honour ==
Club	Wins	Years won	Runner-up	Years runner-up
Ballyhale Shamrocks	8	1992, 2006, 2007, 2008, 2009, 2011, 2016, 2026	2	2010, 2012
Dicksboro	6	1994, 1996, 2017, 2019, 2020, 2023	1	2000
Graigue-Ballycallan	3	1995, 1998, 2003	1	1996
Tullaroan	3	2000, 2002, 2022	1	2024
O'Loughlin Gaels	3	2014, 2024, 2025	4	2017, 2018, 2019, 2020
Young Irelands	2	1997, 1999	3	1995, 2002, 2003
James Stephens	2	2010, 2018	7	1994, 1997, 2007, 2008, 2009, 2011, 2013
Clara	2	2013, 2015	1	2021
Bennettsbridge	1	2021	1	2022
Fenians	1	1993	1	2006
Glenmore	1	2001	3	1998, 1999, 2023
Carrickshock	1	2012		
Erin's Own			2	1993, 2001
Rower-Inistioge			2	2014, 2015
Mullinavat			1	1992
St Martin's			1	2016
Thomastown			1	2025

There was no competition in 2004 and 2005.
