= 2011 Kilkenny Senior Hurling Championship =

Annual hurling competition season

- Dates: 17 September 2011 – 30 October 2011
- Teams: 12
- Sponsor: St. Canice's Credit Union
- Champions: James Stephens (9th title); Jackie Tyrrell (captain); Niall Rigney (manager)
- Runners-up: Ballyhale Shamrocks; Michael Fennelly (captain); Michael Fennelly (manager)
- Relegated: Clara

Tournament statistics
- Matches played: 15
- Goals scored: 33 (2.2 per match)
- Points scored: 410 (27.33 per match)
- Top scorer(s): Henry Shefflin (3-42)

The 2011 Kilkenny Senior Hurling Championship was the 117th staging of the Kilkenny Senior Hurling Championship since its establishment by the Kilkenny County Board in 1887. The Championship began on 17 September 2011 and ended on 30 October 2011.

O'Loughlin Gaels were the defending champions, however they were defeated in the semi-final by Ballyhale Shamrocks.

Clara were relegated from the championship following 0–15 to 0–14 defeat by Tullaroan.

== Team changes ==
=== To Championship ===
Promoted from the Kilkenny Intermediate Hurling Championship

- Dicksboro

=== From Championship ===
Relegated to the Kilkenny Intermediate Hurling Championship

- St. Lachtain's

== Results ==
=== First round ===
17 September 2011 First round	Carrickshock	0-19 - 1-14	Dunnamaggin	Piltown GAA Complex, Piltown
15:00	R Power 0-8, M Rice 0-3, Jamie Power 0-3, John Power 0-2, S Power 0-1, A Power 0-1, M O'Dwyer 0-1.		K Bergin 1-0, JJ Dunphy 0-3, C Hickey 0-2, K Moore 0-2, D Fitzpatrick 0-2, W Phelan 0-2, D Herity 0-1, N Lahart 0-1, B McCormack 0-1.	Referee: M Flynn (Mooncoin)

17 September 2011 First round	Graigue-Ballycallan	1-12 - 1-11	Tullaroan	Palmerstown Sportsfield, Kilkenny
17:00	J Purcell 0-5, M Hoyne 1-0, N Millea 0-2, E Brennan 0-2, D Walton 0-1, C Hoyne 0-1, J Murphy 0-1.		J Coogan 0-8, P Buggy 1-1, Mark Walsh 0-1, Martin Walsh 0-1.	Referee: P Dunphy

18 September 2011 First round	Dicksboro	0-17 - 1-14	Clara	Polo Grounds, Jenkinstown
12:00	E O'Donoghue 0-9, P O'Flynn 0-4, A Stapleton 0-3, M Gaffney 0-1.		K Hogan 0-10, C Phelan 1-1, E O'Shea 0-2, L Ryan 0-1.	Referee: D O'Sullivan (John Lockes)

18 September 2011 First round	Erin's Own	0-07 - 0-09	Fenians	St. Patrick's Park, Ballyragget
13:30	M Boran 0-4, G Byrne 0-1, A Owens 0-1, D Fogarty 0-1.		K Reid 0-7, E Shiel 0-2.	Referee: S Cleere (O'Loughlin Gaels)

24 September 2011 First round replay	Dicksboro	2-16 - 1-17	Clara	Polo Grounds, Jenkinstown
14:00	P O'Flynn 1-3, E O'Donoghue 0-6, S Maher 1-0, D O'Gorman 0-2, E Malone 0-1, M Gaffney 0-1, A Stapleton 0-1, D Ryan 0-1, C Starr 0-1.		K Hogan 1-13, L Ryan 0-2, N Prendergast 0-1, E O'Shea 0-1.	Referee: M Flynn (Mooncoin)

=== Relegation play-off ===
8 October 2011 Play-off	Clara	0-14 - 0-15	Tullaroan	Páirc Lachtáin, Freshford
	K Hogan 0-9, J Nolan 0-3, T Ryan 0-1, L Ryan 0-1.		J Coogan 0-9, P Buggy 0-3, P Walsh 0-2, T Walsh 0-1.	Referee: P Neary (James Stephens)

=== Quarter-finals ===
25 September 2011 Quarter-final	St. Martin's	1-16 - 0-06	Fenians	Nowlan Park, Kilkenny
14:30	J Mulhall 0-6, John Maher 0-6, E McGrath 1-0, Joe Maher 0-2, P Maher 0-1, B Byrne 0-1.		K Reid 0-5, K Power 0-1.	Referee: D Connolly (Mooncoin)

25 September 2011 Quarter-final	Ballyhale Shamrocks	2-17 - 3-14	Carrickshock	Nowlan Park, Kilkenny
15:00	H Shefflin 1-11, C Fennelly 1-0, E Reid 0-2, D Hoyne 0-2, J Fitzpatrick 0-1, TJ Reid 0-1.		R Power 0-9, John Power 2-1, M Rohan 1-1, M O'Dwyer 0-2, M Rice 0-1.	Referee: G Quilty (Slieverue)

25 September 2011 Quarter-final	James Stephens	1-18 - 1-08	Graigue-Ballycallan	John Locke Park, Callan
17:00	E Larkin 1-6, M Ruth 0-4, N Tyrrell 0-3, D McCormack 0-2, D Walton 0-2, D Cody 0-1.		J Purcell 0-4, M Hoyne 1-0, J Hoyne 0-2, E Brennan 0-1, D Heafey 0-1.	Referee: T Duggan (Mullinavat)

1 October 2011 Quarter-final	O'Loughlin Gaels	2-11 - 1-10	Dicksboro	Nowlan Park, Kilkenny
16:00	C Bergin 1-3, M Bergin 1-3, M Comerford 0-2, P Dowling 0-1, M Nolan 0-1, A Geoghegan 0-1.		E O'Donoghue 1-3, M Gaffney 0-3, D O'Gorman 0-1, O Walsh 0-1, A Stapleton 0-1, S Maher 0-1.	Referee: E Mansfield (Cloneen)

2 October 2011 Quarter-final Replay	Ballyhale Shamrocks	2-18 - 1-17	Carrickshock	Nowlan Park, Kilkenny
16:00	H Shefflin 1-7, TJ Reid 0-4, C Walsh 1-0, C Fennelly 0-3, E Reid 0-2, M Aylward 0-1, B Aylward 0-1.		R Power 0-11, John Power 1-2, M Rice 0-2, J Tennyson 0-1, M Rohan 0-1.	Referee: M Flynn (Mooncoin)

=== Semi-finals ===
9 October 2011 Semi-final	James Stephens	3-16 - 2-10	St. Martin's	Nowlan Park, Kilkenny
	E Larkin 1-10, N Tyrrell 1-0, E McCormack 1-0, D Walton 0-2, J Tyrrell 0-2, M Ruth 0-1, D Cody 0-1.		John Maher 1-5, R Shore 1-1, Joe Maher 0-3, J Mulhall 0-1.	Referee: D Connolly (Mooncoin)

9 October 2011 Semi-final	Ballyhale Shamrocks	2-18 - 3-12	O'Loughlin Gaels	Nowlan Park, Kilkenny
16:00	H Shefflin 1-9, C Fennelly 1-1, TJ Reid 0-3, M Aylward 0-2, M Fennelly 0-1, E Reid 0-1, D Hoyne 0-1.		D Loughnane 2-1, M Bergin 0-7, M Comerford 1-0, M Nolan 0-2, M Kelly 0-1, B Dowling 0-1.	Referee: D O'Sullivan (John Lockes)

=== Final ===
23 October 2011 Final	Ballyhale Shamrocks	0-11 - 1-08	James Stephens	Nowlan Park, Kilkenny
15:30	H Shefflin 0-7 (7f), TJ Reid 0-2, C Fennelly, E Reid 0-1 each.	Report	E Larkin 0-6 (5f), D Walton 1-0, D McCormack, E McCormack 0-1 each.	Referee: M Flynn (Mooncoin)

30 October 2011 Final Replay	Ballyhale Shamrocks	0-15 - 1-20	James Stephens	Nowlan Park, Kilkenny
14:45	H Shefflin 0-8 (0-4 fs, 0-1 65); E Reid and TJ Reid 0-2 each; D Hoyne, C Fennelly and C Walsh 0-1 each.	Report	E Larkin 1-11 (0-8 each); N Tyrrell 0-3; D McCormick and M Ruth 0-2 each; T Keogh and J McGrath 0-1 each.	Referee: E Mansfield (Cloneen)

== Championship statistics ==
=== Top scorers ===
Top scorers overall

Rank	Player	Club	Tally	Total	Matches	Average
1	Henry Shefflin	Ballyhale Shamrocks	3-42	51	5	10.20
2	Eoin Larkin	James Stephens	3-33	42	4	10.50
3	Keith Hogan	Clara	1-32	35	3	11.66
4	Richie Power	Carrickshock	0-28	28	3	9.33
5	Eddie O'Donoghue	Dicksboro	1-18	21	3	7.00
6	Jimmy Coogan	Tullaroan	0-17	17	2	8.50
7	John Power	Carrickshock	3-05	14	3	4.66
7	John Maher	St. Martin's	1-11	14	2	7.00
8	Mark Bergin	O'Loughlin Gaels	1-10	13	2	6.50
9	Colin Fennelly	Ballyhale Shamrocks	2-06	12	5	2.40
9	T. J. Reid	Ballyhale Shamrocks	0-12	12	5	2.40
9	Kevin Reid	Fenians	0-12	12	2	6.00

Top scorers in a single game

Rank	Player	Club	Tally	Total	Opposition
1	Keith Hogan	Clara	1-13	16	Dicksboro
2	Henry Shefflin	Ballyhale Shamrocks	1-11	14	Carrickshock
2	Eoin Larkin	James Stephens	1-11	14	Ballyhale Shamrocks
3	Eoin Larkin	James Stephens	1-10	13	St. Martin's
4	Henry Shefflin	Ballyhale Shamrocks	1-09	12	O'Loughlin Gaels
5	Richie Power	Carrickshock	0-11	11	Ballyhale Shamrocks
6	Henry Shefflin	Ballyhale Shamrocks	1-07	10	Carrickshock
7	Eoin Larkin	James Stephens	1-06	9	Graigue-Ballycallan
7	Eddie O'Donoghue	Dicksboro	0-09	9	Clara
7	Keith Hogan	Clara	0-09	9	Tullaroan
7	Jimmy Coogan	Tullaroan	0-09	9	Clara
7	Richie Power	Carrickshock	0-09	9	Ballyhale Shamrocks
