= Brian Hogan (Kilkenny hurler) =

Irish hurler (born 1981)

Personal information
- Native name: Briain Ó hÓgáin (Irish)
- Born: 14 August 1981 (age 45)
- Occupation: Medical rep
- Height: 6 ft 4 in (193 cm)

Sport
- Sport: Hurling
- Position: Centre back
Club
- Years: Club
- 1999–: O'Loughlin Gaels
Club titles
- Kilkenny titles: 4
- Leinster titles: 2
- All-Ireland Titles: 0
Inter-county*
Years	County	Apps (scores)
2004–2014	Kilkenny	26 (0–6)
Inter-county titles
- Leinster titles: 8
- All-Irelands: 7
- NHL: 6
- All Stars: 2
- *Inter County team apps and scores correct as of 20:04, 25 October 2012.

Brian Hogan (born 14 August 1981) is an Irish hurler who played as a centre-back at senior level for the Kilkenny county team until he announced his retirement in 2014.

Hogan made his first appearance for the team during the 2004 championship and has become a regular player over the last few seasons. During that time he has won seven All-Ireland winners' medals, eight Leinster winners' medals, six National League winners' medals and two All-Star award. In 2011 Hogan captained the team to the All-Ireland title.

At club level Hogan is a double Leinster medalist with O'Loughlin Gaels. In addition to this he has also won three county championship winners' medals.

== Playing career ==
=== Club ===
Hogan plays his club hurling with the O'Loughlin Gaels club in Kilkenny city and has enjoyed much success.

In 2001 Hogan won his first county championship winners' medal following a 1–17 to 1–6 defeat of Graigue-Ballycallan. Not only was it Hogan's first club championship but it was O'Loughlin Gaels' first ever.

Two years later in 2003 Hogan won a second county championship winners' medal following a defeat of Young Irelands after a draw and a replay. He later collected a first Leinster club winners' medal following a 0–15 to 0–9 defeat of double All-Ireland champions Birr.

After a hiatus of seven years and a defeat in the 2006 championship decider, O'Loughlin Gaels reached the top of the pile once again in 2010 following a 0–17 to 1–11 defeat of Carrickshock. It was Hogan's third county championship winners' medal. O'Loughlin Gaels later secured a second Leinster club title following a 0–14 to 1–8 defeat of Oulart-the-Ballagh. Hogan's side subsequently qualified for an All-Ireland final showdown with Clarinbridge. A dominant second-half display gave Clarinbridge a 2–18 to 0–12 victory.

=== Inter-county ===
Hogan first came to prominence on the inter-county scene when he joined the Kilkenny senior team in 2004. He made his championship debut at left wing-back in a Leinster semi-final defeat by Wexford. That defeat ended Hogan's involvement as a member of the starting fifteen for the rest of the season, and Kilkenny subsequently failed to capture a third All-Ireland title.

The next two seasons saw Hogan remain with the Kilkenny senior team, albeit as a fringe player. He came on as a substitute in the All-Ireland semi-final defeat by Galway in 2005 and at the same stage against Clare in 2006, but played no part in Kilkenny's subsequent All-Ireland final defeat of Cork.

In 2007 Hogan replaced John Tennyson to become Kilkenny's first-choice centre-back. He won his first Leinster winners' medal on the field of play following a 2–24 to 1–12 demolition of Wexford. He subsequently lined out in his first All-Ireland final, with Limerick providing the opposition. Kilkenny got off to a flying start with Eddie Brennan and Henry Shefflin combining to score two goals within the first ten minutes, eventually culminating in a 2–19 to 1–15 victory. It was Hogan's first All-Ireland winners' medal on the field of play.

Hogan retained his place at centre-back in 2008, as Kilkenny launched an all-out attack in an attempt to capture a third All-Ireland title in-a-row. He collected a second Leinster winners' medal after a 5–21 to 0–17 defeat of Wexford in the provincial final, before later lining out in his second All-Ireland decider. Waterford provided the opposition, however, Kilkenny recorded an enormous 3–30 to 1–13 victory. It was a second All-Ireland winners' medal for Hogan.

In 2009 Hogan won his third National Hurling League winners' medal following a thrilling 4–17 to 2–26 defeat of Tipperary. The game was not without incident as Hogan was forced to leave the field with a suspected collarbone injury. As a result of this he missed the provincial campaign, however, he returned in time for Kilkenny's All-Ireland semi-final defeat of Waterford. The subsequent All-Ireland final was a repeat of the National League final with Kilkenny taking on Tipperary. For much of the match it looked as if Tipp would pull off a shock and deny 'the Cats' a record-equaling four-in-a-row. Two quick goals in the space of a minute, one from a penalty by Henry Shefflin, sealed a 2–22 to 0–23 victory. It was the fourth time in-a-row that the famed Liam MacCarthy Cup was presented to a Kilkenny team while Hogan collected his third All-Ireland winners' medal.

Hogan added a third Leinster winners' medal to his collection in 2010 following a 1–19 to 1–12 defeat of new provincial rivals Galway. In the subsequent All-Ireland semi-final defeat of Cork, Hogan sustained an injury that ruled him out of the All-Ireland final showdown with Tipperary. Kilkenny faced a number of other injuries going into that game and failed in their 'drive for five' as Tipp won by 4–17 to 1–18.

In 2011 Hogan was appointed captain of the Kilkenny senior hurling team for the year. 'The Cats' continued their provincial dominance with Hogan winning a fourth Leinster winners' medal following a defeat of Dublin. Kilkenny later qualified for a sixth consecutive All-Ireland final. For the third year in succession Hogan's side faced Tipperary, however, on this occasion Kilkenny were slight underdogs going up against the new champions. Kilkenny started quickly and never surrendered the lead in the 2–17 to 1–16 victory. It was Hogan's fourth All-Ireland winners' medal while he also had the honour of collecting the MacCarthy Cup as captain.

2012 saw Hogan begin the year by picking up another National League medal following 3–21 to 0–16 trouncing of Cork. After losing the Leinster final to GAlway, both sides subsequently met in the All-Ireland decider and Galway nearly pulled off a victory courtesy of goals from Joe Canning and Niall Burke. A 2–13 to 0–19 draw was the result, a first drawn All-Ireland final in over half a century. The replay saw Kilkenny claim a 3–22 to 3–11 victory, with Hogan picking up a fifth All-Ireland winners' medal.

2013 saw the end of an era with Kilkenny not reaching the All-Ireland Semi-final for the first time since 1996. Kilkenny lost to Cork in the quarter-final.

In 2014 Hogan was in and out of the starting line-up for much of the year. His good performances when he came in got him into the starting line-up for the drawn All-Ireland Final. He was a cause of controversy in the 70th minute when he gave away a suspect free about 97-metre out from the Tipperary goal. Many people thought if anything Hogan should have been awarded the free. However, John 'Bubbles' O' Dwyer's free was wide after Hawk-Eye was called in to make the decision. The miss forced a replay for the 3rd consecutive year. Hogan was not picked to start the replayed game when Kieran Joyce came in and won the man-of-the-match award. Kilkenny won the game and Hogan claimed his seventh All-Ireland medal.

Hogan announced his retirement from inter-county hurling on 26 November 2014.

=== Inter-provincial ===
Hogan also had the honour of lining out for Leinster in the Interprovincial Championship. He secured a winners' medal in this competition in 2012 following a 2–19 to 1–15 defeat of Connacht.

== Honours ==
=== Kilkenny ===
- All-Ireland Senior Hurling Championship:
  - Winner (7): 2006, 2007, 2008, 2009, 2011, 2012, 2014
- Leinster Senior Hurling Championship:
  - Winner (8): 2005, 2006, 2007, 2008, 2009, 2010, 2011, 2014
- National Hurling League:
  - Winner (6): 2005, 2006, 2009, 2012, 2013, 2014
- Walsh Cup:
  - Winner (6):2005, 2006, 2007, 2009, 2012, 2014

Sporting positions
Preceded by T. J. Reid	Kilkenny Senior Hurling Captain; 2011	Succeeded by Eoin Larkin
Achievements
Preceded by Eoin Kelly	All-Ireland SHC winning captain 2011	Succeeded by Eoin Larkin
