= Kilkenny Senior Hurling Championship =

Annual hurling competition

- Current season or competition: 2026 Kilkenny Senior Hurling Championship
- Irish: Craobh Iomána Sinsearach Chill Chainnigh
- Code: Hurling
- Founded: 1887; 139 years ago
- Region: Kilkenny (GAA)
- Trophy: Tom Walsh Cup
- No. of teams: 12
- Title holders: Ballyhale Shamrocks (22nd title)
- Most titles: Ballyhale Shamrocks (22 titles)
- Sponsors: St Canice's Credit Union
- TV partner(s): TG4, RTÉ
- Official website: Official website

The Kilkenny Senior Hurling Championship (known for sponsorship reasons as the St Canice's Credit Union Senior Hurling Championship and abbreviated to the Kilkenny SHC) is an annual hurling competition organised by the Kilkenny County Board of the Gaelic Athletic Association and contested by the top-ranking senior clubs in the county of Kilkenny in Ireland. It is the most prestigious competition in Kilkenny hurling.

Introduced in 1887 as the Kilkenny Hurling Championship, it was initially a straight knockout tournament open only to senior-ranking club teams. The championship has gone through a number of changes throughout the years, including the use of a round robin, before reverting to a straight knockout format.

In its current format, the Kilkenny Senior Championship begins in September with a first round series of games comprising eight teams, while the four remaining teams receive byes to the quarter-final stage. A team's finishing position in the Kilkenny Senior Hurling League determines at what stage they enter the championship. Four rounds of games are played, culminating with the final match at Nowlan Park in October. The winner of the Kilkenny Senior Championship, as well as being presented with the Tom Walsh Cup, qualifies for the subsequent Leinster Club Championship.

The competition has been won by 26 teams, 19 of which have won it more than once. Ballyhale Shamrocks are the most successful team in the tournament's history, having won it 22 times. Ballyhale Shamrocks are the title-holders, defeating Tullaroan by 2-24 to 0-08 in the 2026 final.

== History ==
=== Beginnings ===
Following the foundation of the Gaelic Athletic Association in 1884, new rules for Gaelic football and hurling were drawn up and published in the United Irishman newspaper. County committees were established over the next few years, with the Kilkenny County Board affiliating on 30 January 1887. The inaugural championship was contested by just four clubs, with Tullaroan winning the title after a defeat of Mooncoin. Since then the championship title has been awarded every year except on a handful of occasions. No championships took place in 1891, 1892 and 1912, while several championships between 1916 and 1922 were either cancelled or unfinished due to the Irish revolutionary period. The 1916 championship began in October 1916, however, because of martial law it wasn't completed until June 1919. It was decreed that the winner of the match would be declared champions for all three years.

=== Team dominance ===
The first fifty years of the championship were dominated by Tullaroan based in North Kilkenny and Mooncoin in South Kilkenny, who built up an intense rivalry. Both clubs shared 29 championship titles between 1887 and 1952, however, since the introduction of Parish Rule in 1953, they have won just 3 titles between them. Other clubs who enjoyed limited periods of dominance during this time include city-based club Confederation, who won three titles between 1893 and 1896, and Dicksboro who won two titles from four final appearances during the 1920s. Carrickshock's dominance saw the club play in ten finals between 1938 and 1948, becoming the first team to win four successive championships from 1940 to 1943. Éire Óg also claimed four titles during this period. After a sixty-year hiatus Bennettsbridge returned to winning ways and claimed ten championship titles between 1952 and 1967. Fenians added their name to the roll of honour in 1970 before claiming four more championships before the end of the decade. In 1978 Ballyhale Shamrocks became the latest first-time champions and ushered in a new era of dominance by winning 10 more championship titles by 1991. As Ballyhale went into decline, Glenmore dominated the nineties by winning five championships between 1987 and 1999. The first decade of the new century saw O'Loughlin Gaels and James Stephens win two titles apiece, while Ballyhale Shamrocks ended the decade with four successive championships before winning four more in 2012, 2014, 2018 and 2019.

== Format ==
The Kilkenny Senior Hurling Championship is a single elimination tournament. Each team is afforded just one defeat before being eliminated from the championship. Pairings for matches are drawn at random, however, there is a certain level of seeding based on league performance.

If a match is drawn there is a replay. If both sides are still level at the end of the replay there is a period of extra time and so on until a winner is found.

=== League ===
The league begins with two groups of six teams. The teams are ranked in the group stage table by points gained, then scoring difference and then their head-to-head record. Following the completion of the league, the top two teams from each group receive byes to separate quarter-finals in the championship. The two third-placed teams plays the sixth-placed teams from the opposite group, and the two fourth-placed teams plays the fifth-placed teams in the first round of the championship.

=== Knockout Stage ===
First round: 8 teams contest this round. The 4 winning teams advance directly to the quarter-final stage. The 4 losing teams are eliminated from the championship.

Quarter-finals: The four first round winners and the four teams given a bye contest this round. The four winners from these four games advance to the semi-finals.

Semi-finals: The four quarter-final winners contest this round. The two winners from these two games advance to the final.

Final: The two semi-final winners contest the final. The winning team are declared champions.

=== Relegation ===
The four first round losers take part in a series of play-offs, with the losing team being relegated to the Kilkenny Intermediate Hurling Championship.

=== Qualification ===
At the end of the championship, the winning team qualify to the subsequent Leinster Senior Club Hurling Championship.

== Teams ==
=== 2026 Teams ===
The 12 teams competing in the 2026 Kilkenny Senior Hurling Championship were:

Team	Location	Colours	Position in 2026	In Senior championship since	Championship titles	Last championship title
Ballyhale Shamrocks	Ballyhale, Knocktopher and Knockmoylan	White & Green	Winners	1998	22	2026
Bennettsbridge	Bennettsbridge	Green & Yellow	Semi-finals	2016	12	1971
Clara	Clara	Maroon & White	Quarter-finals	2013	3	2015
Danesfort	Danesfort	Blue & white	Relegation playoff winners	2026	0	—
Dicksboro	Palmerstown	Maroon & White	Round 1	2011	5	2017
Erin's Own	Castlecomer	Blue & White	Relegated	2009	0	—
Glenmore	Glenmore	Green and gold	Quarter-finals	2022	5	1999
Graigue-Ballycallan	Kilmanagh	Sky Blue & White	Quarter-finals	2019	2	2000
Mullinavat	Mullinavat	Black & White	Round 1	2015	0	—
O'Loughlin Gaels	St John's Parish	White & Green	Quarter-finals	1997	5	2023
Thomastown	Thomastown	Blue and white	Semi-finals	2024	2	2024
Tullaroan	Tullaroan	Green & White	Runners-up	2020	20	1994

== Sponsorship ==
Since 1991 the Kilkenny County Championship has been sponsored by the St Canice's Credit Union.

== Managers ==
Managers in the Kilkenny Championship are involved in the day-to-day running of the team, including the training, team selection, and sourcing of players. Their influence varies from club-to-club and is related to the individual club committees. The manager is assisted by a team of two or three selectors and a backroom team consisting of various coaches.

Winning managers (1999–present)
Manager	Team	Wins	Winning years
Michael Nolan	O'Loughlin Gaels	3	2001, 2003, 2010
Maurice Aylward	Ballyhale Shamrocks	3	2006, 2007, 2008
Henry Shefflin	Ballyhale Shamrocks	3	2018, 2019, 2025
Adrian Finan	James Stephens	2	2004, 2005
Mick Purcell	Clara	2	2013, 2015
James O'Connor	Ballyhale Shamrocks	2	2020, 2021
Jim Neary	Graigue-Ballycallan	2	1998, 2000
Tom Casey	Glenmore	1	1999
John Brennan	Young Irelands	1	2002
Mick Fennelly / James McGarry	Ballyhale Shamrocks	1	2009
Niall Rigney	James Stephens	1	2011
Tommy Shefflin	Ballyhale Shamrocks	1	2012
Colm Bonnar / Andy Moloney	Ballyhale Shamrocks	1	2014
Aidan Fogarty	O'Loughlin Gaels	1	2016
Mark Dowling	Dicksboro	1	2017
Pat Hoban	Ballyhale Shamrocks	1	2022
Brian Hogan	O'Loughlin Gaels	1	2023
Noel Doherty	Thomastown	1	2024
Mark Alyward	Ballyhale Shamrocks	1	2026

== List of finals ==
=== Legend ===
- Gold – All-Ireland senior club champions
- Silver – All-Ireland senior club runners-up

=== List of Kilkenny SHC finals ===
Year	Winners		Runners-up	
Year	Club	Score	Club	Score
2026	Ballyhale Shamrocks	2-24	Tullaroan	0-08
2025	Ballyhale Shamrocks	1-18	O'Loughlin Gaels	0-12
2024	Thomastown	0-18	O'Loughlin Gaels	0-07
2023	O'Loughlin Gaels	0-20	Ballyhale Shamrocks	0-19
2022	Ballyhale Shamrocks	1-21	James Stephens	2-11
2021	Ballyhale Shamrocks	3-19	O'Loughlin Gaels	3-15
2020	Ballyhale Shamrocks	5-19	Dicksboro	1-10
2019	Ballyhale Shamrocks	2-21	James Stephens	1-15
2018	Ballyhale Shamrocks	2-20	Bennettsbridge	2-17
2017	Dicksboro	4-15	James Stephens	4-10
2016	O'Loughlin Gaels	0-19	Ballyhale Shamrocks	1-12
2015	Clara	2-12	O'Loughlin Gaels	1-13
2014	Ballyhale Shamrocks	1-20	Clara	1-13
2013	Clara	1-15	Carrickshock	2-10
2012	Ballyhale Shamrocks	0-16	Dicksboro	0-12
2011	James Stephens	1-08, 1-20 (R)	Ballyhale Shamrocks	0–11, 0-15 (R)
2010	O'Loughlin Gaels	0-17	Carrickshock	1-11
2009	Ballyhale Shamrocks	1-14	James Stephens	1-11
2008	Ballyhale Shamrocks	2-11	James Stephens	0-12
2007	Ballyhale Shamrocks	1-20	St Martin's	1-10
2006	Ballyhale Shamrocks	1-22	O'Loughlin Gaels	2-11
2005	James Stephens	1-18	Ballyhale Shamrocks	2-12
2004	James Stephens	2-16	Young Irelands	3-12
2003	O'Loughlin Gaels	3-09, 2-12 (R)	Young Irelands	2–12, 2-10 (R)
2002	Young Irelands	3-14	Dunnamaggin	1-15
2001	O'Loughlin Gaels	1-17	Graigue-Ballycallan	1-06
2000	Graigue-Ballycallan	0-16	O'Loughlin Gaels	0-09
1999	Glenmore	1-14	Graigue-Ballycallan	2-08
1998	Graigue-Ballycallan	1-14	The Fenians	0-12
1997	Dunnamaggin	2-10	Young Irelands	2-07
1996	Young Irelands	2–10, 3-09 (R)	James Stephens	0–16, 2-10 (R)
1995	Glenmore	3-19	The Fenians	1-14
1994	Tullaroan	1-06	Dicksboro	0-06
1993	Dicksboro	0–12, 2-09 (R)	The Fenians	0–12, 1-09 (R)
1992	Glenmore	1-14	Tullaroan	2-06
1991	Ballyhale Shamrocks	3-16	St Martin's	1-08
1990	Glenmore	3-15	Clara	2-06
1989	Ballyhale Shamrocks	2-11	Glenmore	1-13
1988	Ballyhale Shamrocks	2-15	Thomastown	0-04
1987	Glenmore	4-10	Ballyhale Shamrocks	3-09
1986	Clara	3-10	Ballyhale Shamrocks	4-05
1985	Ballyhale Shamrocks	4-18	Glenmore	3-13
1984	St Martin's	1-14	Ballyhale Shamrocks	1-07
1983	Ballyhale Shamrocks	2-14	James Stephens	1-08
1982	Ballyhale Shamrocks	3-10	James Stephens	2-04
1981	James Stephens	2-10	The Fenians	0-08
1980	Ballyhale Shamrocks	3–10, 3-13 (R)	Muckalee/Ballyfoyle Rangers	2–13, 1-10 (R)
1979*	Ballyhale Shamrocks	0–14, 3-12 (R)	Erin's Own	0–14, 1-06 (R)
1978	Ballyhale Shamrocks	0-15	The Fenians	0-10
1977	The Fenians	3-11	Rower-Inistioge	1-10
1976	James Stephens	2-14	Rower-Inistioge	0-13
1975	James Stephens	1-14	Galmoy	1-05
1974	The Fenians	0-10	Bennettsbridge	0-06
1973	The Fenians	7-08	James Stephens	5-10
1972	The Fenians	3-10	Bennettsbridge	1-06
1971	Bennettsbridge	3-10	The Fenians	1-07
1970	The Fenians	2-11	James Stephens	3-05
1969	James Stephens	8-05	The Fenians	2-07
1968	Rower-Inistioge	3-09	Bennettsbridge	3-07
1967	Bennettsbridge	3-10	Thomastown	1-04
1966	Bennettsbridge	4-08	Mooncoin	2-04
1965	Mooncoin	2-08	Bennettsbridge	1-08
1964	Bennettsbridge	4-09	Glenmore	1-04
1963	St Lachtain's	1-07	Tullogher	0-03
1962	Bennettsbridge	5-07	Lisdowney	2-08
1961	St Lachtain's	4-05	Near South	0-12
1960	Bennettsbridge	4-05	Glenmore	3-04
1959	Bennettsbridge	4-06	Erin's Own	1-04
1958	Tullaroan	1-12	Bennettsbridge	3-02
1957	John Lockes	4-04	Slieverue	0-05
1956	Bennettsbridge	2-08	John Lockes	3-03
1955	Bennettsbridge	6-06	Mooncoin	1-04
1954	Slieverue	6-05	Tullaroan	4-03
1953	Bennettsbridge	3-11	Slieverue	3-06
1952	Bennettsbridge	5-03	Tullaroan	4-05
1951	Carrickshock	5-06	Tullaroan	4-05
1950	Dicksboro	3–17, 4-06 (R)	Éire Óg	6-08, 1-05 (R)
1949	Graigue	3-12	Tullaroan	2-14
1948	Tullaroan	1-12	Carrickshock	2-03
1947	Éire Óg	3-10	Tullaroan	0-13
1946	Thomastown	5-04	Carrickshock	4-05
1945	Éire Óg	2-07, 4-08 (R)	Carrickshock	1–10, 1-07 (R)
1944	Éire Óg	7-09	Carrickshock	4-04
1943	Carrickshock	3-06	Mullinavat	1-03
1942	Carrickshock	3-02	Threecastles	2-03
1941	Carrickshock	4-05	Éire Óg	3-07
1940	Carrickshock	1-04	Mullinavat	1-02
1939	Éire Óg	3-07	Carrickshock	3-05
1938	Carrickshock	2-05	Éire Óg	1-05
1937	James Stephens	3-08	Dicksboro	1-02
1936	Mooncoin	4-02	Tullaroan	4-01
1935	James Stephens	3-05	Carrickshock	2-05
1934	Tullaroan	6-06	Carrickshock	1-05
1933	Tullaroan	6-05	Carrickshock	5-04
1932	Mooncoin	6-04	Carrickshock	5-05
1931	Carrickshock	5-08	Urlingford	3-08
1930	Tullaroan	4-04	Urlingford	0-03
1929	Mooncoin	3-02, 5-01 (R)	Carrickshock	3-02, 3-03 (R)
1928	Mooncoin	4-02	Dicksboro	3-02
1927*	Mooncoin	4-02, 4-03, 2-04, 2-04	James Stephens	3-02, 2-04, 1-03, 2-02
1926	Dicksboro	5-05	Mooncoin	1-04
1925	Tullaroan	3-04	Dicksboro	3-03
1924	Tullaroan	4-04	Clonmanto	2-02
1923	Dicksboro	7-04	Mooncoin	3-01
1922	No Championship			
1921	No Championship			
1920	No Championship			
1919*	No Championship			
1918*	Mooncoin	(combined with 1916 c'ship)		
1917*	Mooncoin	(combined with 1916 c'ship)		
1916	Mooncoin	4-01, 5-02 (R)	Tullaroan	4-01, 2-03 (R)
1915	Tullaroan	7-02	Dicksboro	2-02
1914	Johnstown	3-01	Erin's Own	0-00
1913	Mooncoin	5-07	Tullaroan	3-04
1912	No Championship			
1911	Tullaroan	4-03	Mooncoin	2-05
1910	Tullaroan	7-01	Piltown	3-00
1909	Erin's Own	1-12	Mooncoin	1-07
1908	Mooncoin	5-17	Threecastles	3-05
1907	Tullaroan	2-06	Mooncoin	1-03
1906*	Mooncoin	3-06	Tullaroan	1-12
1905	Erin's Own	5-06	Tullaroan	2-08
1904	Tullaroan	6-14	Piltown	1-06
1903	Threecastles	0-03, 2-10 (R)	Kilmanagh	0-02, 0-05 (R)
1902	Tullaroan	3-16	Mooncoin	0-01
1901	Tullaroan	5-10	Threecastles	3-07
1900	Mooncoin	5-09	Freshford	1-15
1899	Tullaroan	3-06	Young Irelands, Tullaroan	1-05
1898	Threecastles	4-01	Confederation	2-03
1897	Tullaroan	3-11	Mooncoin	2-01
1896	Confederation	w/o	Callan	scr.
1895	Tullaroan	1-04	Threecastles	1-02
1894	Confederation	2-05	Callan	1-01
1893	Confederation	1-04	Callan	0-00
1891–1892	No Championship			
1890	Bennettsbridge	1-04	Callan	0-01
1889	Tullaroan	0-01	Graine	0-00
1888	Mooncoin	2-02	Confederation	0-00
1887*	Tullaroan	1-01	Mooncoin	0-04

Notes:

- 1887 - Goal outweighed any number of points.
- 1906 - Mooncoin awarded title.
- 1917-18 - Combined with 1916 Championship.
- 1919 - Tullaroan and Mooncoin failed to agree on a venue, declared null and void.
- 1927 (First game) - Late goal scored after final whistle. Replay agreed.
- 1927 (Replay) - Objection, replay agreed.
- 1927 (Second Replay) - Unfinished due to conditions.
- 1979 - Game unfinished. Ballyhale awarded the title.

== Roll of honour ==
=== By club ===
#	Club	Titles	Runners-up	Championships won	Championships runner-up
1	Ballyhale Shamrocks	22	7	1978, 1979, 1980, 1982, 1983, 1985, 1988, 1989, 1991, 2006, 2007, 2008, 2009, 2012, 2014, 2018, 2019, 2020, 2021, 2022, 2025, 2026	1984, 1986, 1987, 2005, 2011, 2016, 2023
2	Tullaroan	20	12	1887, 1889, 1895, 1897, 1899, 1901, 1902, 1904, 1907, 1910, 1911, 1915, 1924, 1925, 1930, 1933, 1934, 1948, 1958, 1994	1905, 1906, 1913, 1916, 1936, 1947, 1949, 1951, 1952, 1954, 1992, 2026
3	Mooncoin	12	10	1888, 1900, 1906, 1908, 1913, 1916, 1927, 1928, 1929, 1932, 1936, 1965	1887, 1897, 1902, 1907, 1909, 1911, 1923, 1926, 1955, 1966
3	Bennettsbridge	12	6	1890, 1952, 1953, 1955, 1956, 1959, 1960, 1962, 1964, 1966, 1967, 1971	1958, 1965, 1968, 1972, 1974, 2018
5	James Stephens	9	11	1935, 1937, 1969, 1975, 1976, 1981, 2004, 2005, 2011	1927, 1970, 1973, 1982, 1983, 1996, 2008, 2009, 2017, 2019, 2022
6	Carrickshock	7	12	1931, 1938, 1940, 1941, 1942, 1943, 1951	1929, 1932, 1933, 1934, 1935, 1939, 1944, 1945, 1946, 1948, 2010, 2013
7	Fenians	5	7	1970, 1972, 1973, 1974, 1977	1969, 1971, 1978, 1981, 1993, 1995, 1998
7	Dicksboro	5	7	1923, 1926, 1950, 1993, 2017	1915, 1925, 1928, 1937, 1994, 2012, 2020
7	O'Loughlin Gaels	5	6	2001, 2003, 2010, 2016, 2023	2000, 2006, 2015, 2021, 2024, 2025
7	Glenmore	5	4	1987, 1990, 1992, 1995, 1999	1960, 1964, 1985, 1989
11	Éire Óg	4	3	1939, 1944, 1945, 1947	1938, 1941, 1950
12	Confederation (City)	3	2	1893, 1894, 1896	1888, 1898
12	Clara	3	2	1986, 2013, 2015	1990, 2014
14	Threecastles	2	3	1898, 1903	1895, 1901, 1908
14	Young Irelands	2	3	1996, 2002	1997, 2003, 2004
14	Thomastown	2	2	1946, 2024	1967, 1988
14	Graigue–Ballycallan	2	2	1998, 2000	1999, 2001
14	Erin's Own (Kilkenny city)	2	1	1905, 1909	1914
14	St Lachtain's	2	0	1961, 1963	—
20	John Locke's (Callan)	1	4	1957	1890, 1893, 1894, 1956
20	Slieverue	1	2	1954	1953, 1957
20	Rower–Inistioge	1	2	1968	1976, 1977
20	St Martin's	1	2	1984	1991, 2007
20	Dunnamaggin	1	1	1997	2002
20	Johnstown	1	0	1914	—
20	Graigue	1	0	1949	—
27	Piltown	0	2	—	1904, 1910
27	Urlingford	0	2	—	1930, 1931
27	Mullinavat	0	2	—	1940, 1943
27	Erin's Own	0	2	—	1959, 1979
27	Graine	0	1	—	1889
27	Freshford	0	1	—	1900
27	Kilmanagh	0	1	—	1903
27	Clomanto	0	1	—	1924
27	Near South	0	1	—	1961
27	Lisdowney	0	1	—	1962
27	Tullogher	0	1	—	1963
27	Galmoy	0	1	—	1975
27	Muckalee/Ballyfoyle Rangers	0	1	—	1980

== Records ==
=== Teams ===
==== By decade ====
The most successful team of each decade, judged by number of Kilkenny Senior Hurling Championship titles, is as follows:

- 1880s: 2 for Tullaroan (1887–89)
- 1890s: 3 each for Tullaroan (1895-97-99) and Confederation (1893-94-96)
- 1900s: 4 for Tullaroan (1901-02-04-07)
- 1910s: 3 for Tullaroan (1910-11-15)
- 1920s: 3 for Mooncoin (1927-28-29)
- 1930s: 3 for Tullaroan (1930-33-34)
- 1940s: 4 for Carrickshock (1940-41-42-43)
- 1950s: 5 for Bennettsbridge (1952-53-55-56-59)
- 1960s: 5 for Bennettsbridge (1960-62-64-66-67)
- 1970s: 5 for Fenians (1970-72-73-74-77)
- 1980s: 6 for Ballyhale Shamrocks (1980-82-83-85-88-89)
- 1990s: 4 for Glenmore (1990-92-95-99)
- 2000s: 4 for Ballyhale Shamrocks (2006-07-08-09)
- 2010s: 4 for Ballyhale Shamrocks (2012-14-18-19)
- 2020s: 5 for Ballyhale Shamrocks (2020-21-22-25-26)

==== Most consecutive wins ====
#	Wins	Club	Years won
1st	5	Ballyhale Shamrocks	2018, 2019, 2020, 2021, 2022
2nd	4	Carrickshock	1940, 1941, 1942, 1943
2nd	4	Ballyhale Shamrocks	2006, 2007, 2008, 2009
3rd	3	Mooncoin	1927, 1928, 1929
3rd	3	Fenians	1972, 1973, 1974
3rd	3	Ballyhale Shamrocks	1978, 1979, 1980

==== Most consecutive appearances ====
Pos.	No.	Club	Years in sequence
1st	9	Carrickshock	1938, 1939, 1940, 1941, 1942, 1943, 1944, 1945, 1946
2nd	8	Ballyhale Shamrocks	1982, 1983, 1984, 1985, 1986, 1987, 1988, 1989
3rd	6	Fenians	1969, 1970, 1971, 1972, 1973, 1974
3rd	6	Ballyhale Shamrocks	2018, 2019, 2020, 2021, 2022, 2023
4th	5	Carrickshock	1931, 1932, 1933, 1934, 1935
4th	5	Bennettsbridge	1964, 1965, 1966, 1967, 1968
4th	5	Ballyhale Shamrocks	2005, 2006, 2007, 2008, 2009
5th	4	Tullaroan	1904, 1905, 1906, 1907
5th	4	Mooncoin	1906, 1907, 1908, 1909
5th	4		1926, 1927, 1928, 1929
5th	4	Graigue-Ballycallan	1998, 1999, 2000, 2001

==== Most consecutive wins (championship matches) ====
Ballyhale Shamrocks - 23 matches (1st round 2018 to semi-final 2023)

==== Gaps/wins ====
Top ten longest gaps between championship titles:

- 78 years: Thomastown (1946-2024)
- 62 years: Bennettsbridge (1890-1952)
- 43 years: Dicksboro (1950-1993)
- 36 years: Tullaroan (1958-1994)
- 32 years: James Stephens (1937-1969)
- 29 years: Mooncoin (1936-1965)
- 27 years: Clara (1986-2013)
- 24 years: Dicksboro (1993-2017)
- 24 years: Dicksboro (1926-1950)
- 23 years: James Stephens (1981-2004)

==== Gaps/appearances ====
Top ten longest gaps between appearances in a final (bold denotes a win):

- 67 years: John Locke's (1890-**1957**)
- 62 years: Bennettsbridge (**1890-1952**)
- 59 years: Carrickshock (**1951**-2010)
- 44 years: Bennettsbridge (1974-2018)
- 43 years: Dicksboro (**1950-1993**)
- 34 years: Tullaroan (**1958**-1992)
- 36 years: Thomastown (1988-**2024**)
- 32 years: James Stephens (**1937-1969**)
- 23 years: Clara (1990-**2013**)
- 21 years: Glenmore (1964-1985)
- 21 years: Thomastown (**1946**-1967)
- 21 years: Thomastown (1967-1988)

==== Most appearances in final ====
Pos.	Club	Total	Won	Draw	Lost	Period	Win %
1	Tullaroan	33	20	1	12	1887-206	64.5%
2	Ballyhale Shamrocks	32	22	3	7	1978-2026	76.0%
3	Mooncoin	25	12	3	10	1888-1966	54.5%
4	James Stephens	23	9	3	11	1927-2022	47.4%
4	Carrickshock	21	7	2	12	1929-2013	36.8%
5	Benettsbridge	18	12	0	6	1890-2018	66.6%

==== Most regular pairing in finals ====
Pos.	No. of finals	Club	Wins	Years	Club	Wins	Years
1	9	Tullaroan	5	1887, 1897, 1902, 1907, 1911	Mooncoin	4	1906, 1913, 1916, 1936
2	8	Ballyhale Shamrocks	6	1982, 1983, 2008, 2009, 2019, 2022	James Stephens	2	2005, 2011

==== Biggest wins ====
- The most one sided Kilkenny finals since 1896 when goals were made equal to three points:
  - **24 points** – 1902: Tullaroan 3-16 (25) – 0-01 (1) Mooncoin
  - **23 points** – 1904: Tullaroan 6-14 (32) – 1-6 (9) Piltown
  - **22 points** – 2026: Ballyhale Shamrocks 2.24 (30) – 0.08 (8) Tullaroan
  - **21 points** – 2020: Ballyhale Shamrocks 5-19 (34) – 1-10 (13) Dicksboro
  - **18 points** – 1908: Mooncoin 5-17 (32) – 3-05 (14) Threecastles
  - **17 points** – 1955: Benettsbridge 6-06 (24) – 1-04 (7) Mooncoin
  - **17 points** – 1988: Ballyhale Shamrocks 2-15 (21) – 0-04 (4) Thomastown
  - **16 points** – 1934: Tullaroan 6-06 (24) – 1-04 (7) Carrickshock
  - **16 points** – 1969: James Stephens 8-05 (29) – 2-07 (13) Fenians
  - **15 points** – 1915: Tullaroan 7-02 (23) – 2-02 (8) Dicksboro
  - **15 points** – 1923: Dicksboro 7-04 (25) – 3-01 (10) Mooncoin
  - **14 points** – 1944: Eire Og 7-09 (30) – 4.04 (16) Carrickshock
  - **14 points** – 1964: Bennettsbridge 4-09 (21) - 1-04 (7) Glenmore
  - **14 points** – 1991: Ballyhale Shamrocks 3-16 (25) – 1-08 (11) St. Martin's

=== Top scorers/team ===
==== Final ====
Pos.	Year	Club	Goals	Points	Total
1	2020	Ballyhale Shamrocks	5	19	34
2	1904	Tullaroan	6	14	32
3	1944	Eire Og	7	9	30
3	2026	Ballyhale Shamrocks	2	24	30
3	1985	Ballyhale Shamrocks	4	18	30
4	1969	James Stephens	8	5	29
4	1973	The Fenians	7	8	29
5	1995	Glenmore	3	19	28
5	2021	Ballyhale Shamrocks	3	19	28
6	2017	Dicksboro	4	15	27
6	2019	Ballyhale Shamrocks	2	21	27
7	**1950**	Dicksboro	3	17	26
7	**1950**	Eire Og	6	8	26
7	2018	Ballyhale Shamrocks	2	20	26
8	**1973**	James Stephens	5	10	25
8	1901	Tullaroan	5	10	25
8	1923	Dicksboro	7	4	25
8	1991	Ballyhale Shamrocks	3	16	25
8	2006	Ballyhale Shamrocks	1	22	25

NOTES:

- **1950** - Drawn match
- **1973** - Highest score by a losing team

=== FINALS from 1995 to 2026 ===
Pos.	Name	Club	Goals	Points	Total
1	T. J. Reid	Ballyhale Shamrocks	3	106	110
2	D. J. Carey	Young Irelands	11	34	67
3	Mark Bergin	O'Loughlin Gaels	0	50	50
4	Eoin Larkin	James Stephens	1	45	48
5	Henry Shefflin	Ballyhale Shamrocks	0	41	41
6	Eoin Reid	Ballyhale Shamrocks	6	22	40
7	Nigel Skehan	O'Loughlin Gaels	4	26	38
8	Colin Fennelly	Ballyhale Shamrocks	1	16	19
9	Keith Hogan	Clara	0	18	18
10	Adrian Ronan	Graigue-Ballycallan	3	8	17

==== By year ====
Year	Top scorer	Team	Score	Total
2016	Richie Hogan	Danesfort	0-40	40
2017	David Walton	James Stephens	1-51	54
2018	T. J. Reid	Ballyhale Shamrocks	3-41	50
2019	T. J. Reid	Ballyhale Shamrocks	1-34	37
2020	T. J. Reid	Ballyhale Shamrocks	3-39	48
2021	T. J. Reid	Ballyhale Shamrocks	1-31	34
2022	Niall Brassil	James Stephens	0-41	41

==== Finals ====
Final	Top scorer	Team	Score	Total
1992	Ray Heffernan	Glenmore	1-10	13
1993	Tommy Bawle (D)	Dicksboro	0-06	6
1993	Sam Morrissey (R)	Dicksboro	1-02	5
1994	Derek Gaffney	Tullaroan	0-04	4
1995	Ray Heffernan	Glenmore	0-07	7
1996	D. J. Carey (D)	Young Irelands	1-05	8
1996	D. J. Carey (R)	Young Irelands	2-04	10
1997	D. J. Carey	Young Irelands	1-02	5
1998	Damien Cleere	Graigue-Ballycallan	0-08	8
1998	Brendan Ryan	Fenians	0-08	8
1999	Denis Byrne	Graigue-Ballycallan	0-06	6
2000	Nigel Skehan	O'Loughlin Gaels	0-05	5
2001	Nigel Skehan	O'Loughlin Gaels	1-09	12
2002	D. J. Carey	Young Irelands	2-07	13
2003	Nigel Skehan (D)	O'Loughlin Gaels	2-03	9
2003	Nigel Skehan (R)	O'Loughlin Gaels	1-07	10
2003	D. J. Carey (R)	Young Irelands	1-07	10
2004	D. J. Carey	Young Irelands	3-06	15
2005	Eoin Larkin	James Stephens	0-09	9
2006	Henry Shefflin	Ballyhale Shamrocks	0-10	10
2007	T. J. Reid	Ballyhale Shamrocks	0-10	10
2008	Eoin Reid	Ballyhale Shamrocks	1-02	5
2009	T. J. Reid	Ballyhale Shamrocks	1-03	6
2009	Eoin Reid	Ballyhale Shamrocks	0-06	6
2010	Richie Power	Carrickshock	0-12	12
2011	Henry Shefflin (D)	Ballyhale Shamrocks	0-07	7
2011	Eoin Larkin (R)	James Stephens	1-11	14
2012	Martin Gaffney	Dicksboro	0-08	8
2013	Keith Hogan	Clara	0-10	10
2014	T. J. Reid	Ballyhale Shamrocks	0-10	10
2015	Mark Bergin	O'Loughlin Gaels	0-08	8
2016	Mark Bergin	O'Loughlin Gaels	0-11	11
2017	David Walton	James Stephens	1-05	8
2018	T. J. Reid	Ballyhale Shamrocks	1-10	13
2019	Eoin Guilfoyle	James Stephens	0-08	8
2020	T. J. Reid	Ballyhale Shamrocks	0-08	8
2020	Eoin Reid	Ballyhale Shamrocks	2-02	8
2021	T. J. Reid	Ballyhale Shamrocks	0-09	9
2021	Paddy Deegan	O'Loughlin Gaels	2-03	9
2022	T. J. Reid	Ballyhale Shamrocks	0-06	6
2023	Mark Bergin	O'Loughlin Gaels	0-10	10
2024	Robbie Donnelly	Thomastown	0-08	8
2025	T. J. Reid	Ballyhale Shamrocks	0-11	11
2026	A. Mullen	Ballyhale Shamrocks	1-03	6

== See also ==
- Kilkenny Senior Football Championship
- Leinster Senior Club Hurling Championship
- Kilkenny Intermediate Hurling Championship
- Kilkenny Premier Junior Hurling Championship
- Kilkenny Senior Hurling League
