= Clara GAA =

Gaelic Athletic Association club

Clara
- Clárach
- Founded: 1954
- County: Kilkenny
- Nickname: The Moat hurlers
- Colours
- Grounds: Clara GAA Grounds
- Coordinates: 52.646°N 7.146°W

Playing kits
Standard colours

Senior Club Championships
	All Ireland	Leinster champions	Kilkenny champions
Hurling:	0	0	3

Clara GAA is a Gaelic Athletic Association club in Clara, County Kilkenny, Ireland. The club is affiliated to the Kilkenny County Board and fields teams in both hurling, Gaelic football and camogie

== History ==
Located in the townland of Clara, about 7 km east of Kilkenny city, Clara GAA Club was founded in 1954. Originally known as the Moat hurlers, they later changed their name to St Colman's, Clara. The club has simply known as Clara since 1960.

Clara's first notable success came in 1969, when the club won its first Kilkenny JHC title and secured senior status for the first time. A second Kilkenny JHC title followed in 1977, while the club won its first Kilkenny IHC title in 1982, following a 0–13 to 0–09 win over Carrickshock in the final. Clara won their inaugural Kilkenny SHC title in 1986, when a late goal secured a 3–10 to 4–05 win over Ballyhale Shamrocks.

Clara later lost its senior status, however, there were further Kilkenny IHC title wins in 1998, 2007 and 2012, as well as a Leinster Club IHC success. In February 2013, the club beat St Gabriel's by 1–16 to 0–13 to claim the All-Ireland Club IHC title. The success continued later in the year, when Clara beat Carrickshock by 1–15 to 2–10 to claim a second Kilkenny SHC title. A third such title was won in 2015, after a 2–12 to 1–13 defeat of O'Loughlin Gaels in the final.

== Honours ==
- Kilkenny Senior Hurling Championships (3): 1986, 2013, 2015
- Kilkenny Senior Hurling League (1): 2013
- All-Ireland Intermediate Club Hurling Championships (1) 2013
- Leinster Intermediate Club Hurling Championships (1): 2012
- Kilkenny Intermediate Hurling Championships (4): 1982, 1998, 2007, 2012
- Kilkenny Junior Hurling Championships (2): 1969, 1977
- Kilkenny Under-21 A Hurling Championships (3) 1967, 1979, 1984
- Kilkenny Minor A Hurling Championships (1): 2007

== Notable players ==
- Lester Ryan: All-Ireland SHC-winning captain (2014)
