= 2021 Kilkenny Senior Hurling Championship =

Annual hurling competition season

- Dates: 2 October - 7 November 2021
- Teams: 12
- Sponsor: St. Canice's Credit Union
- Champions: Ballyhale Shamrocks (19th title); Colin Fennelly (captain); James O'Connor (manager)
- Runners-up: O'Loughlin Gaels; Andy Comerford (manager)
- Relegated: Rower-Inistioge

Tournament statistics
- Matches played: 14
- Goals scored: 44 (3.14 per match)
- Points scored: 509 (36.36 per match)
- Top scorer(s): T. J. Reid (1-31)

The 2021 Kilkenny Senior Hurling Championship was the 127th staging of the Kilkenny Senior Hurling Championship since its establishment by the Kilkenny County Board in 1887. The championship began on 2 October 2021 and ended on 7 November 2021.

Ballyhale Shamrocks entered the championship as the defending champions. Rower-Inistioge were relegated from the championship after being beaten in a playoff by Erin's Own.

The final was played on 7 November 2021 at UPMC Nowlan Park in Kilkenny, between Ballyhale Shamrocks and O'Loughlin Gaels, in what was their first meeting in a final in five years. Ballyhale Shamrocks won the match by 3–19 to 3–15 to claim their 19th championship title overall and a fourth title in succession.

T. J. Reid was the championship's top scorer with 1-31.

== Team changes ==
=== To Championship ===
Promoted from the Kilkenny Intermediate Hurling Championship

- Lisdowney

=== From Championship ===
Relegated to the Kilkenny Intermediate Hurling Championship

- Danesfort

== Results ==
=== First round ===
2 October 2021 First round	O'Loughlin Gaels	3-25 - 0-21	Rower-Inistioge	Thomastown Sportsfield
	O Wall 2-2, C Kelly 1-3, E O'Shea 0-5, P Deegan 0-5, M Bergin 0-2, P Butler 0-2, C Heary 0-1, S Murphy 0-1, L Hogan 0-1.		J Walsh 0-9, R Leahy 0-3, S Ryan 0-3, T Doyle 0-2, J Ryan 0-1, E O'Brien 0-1, K Joyce 0-1, K Murphy 0-1.	Referee: P Burke

2 October 2021 First round	Ballyhale Shamrocks	3-23 - 2-20	Graigue-Ballycallan	John Locke Park
	C Fennelly (2-1); J Cuddihy (1-5); TJ Reid (0-5, 0-2 frees); B Cody, E Cody (0-4 each); E Shefflin (0-3); R Reid (0-1).	Report	S Ryan (1-9, 0-4 frees, 0-2 65); B Ryan (1-3); S Butler (0-3); S O’Dwyer, P Cahill (0-2 each); C Prendiville (0-1).	Referee: S Cleere

3 October 2021 First round	Dicksboro	1-19 - 2-15	Lisdowney	Páirc Lachtáin
	S Stapleton 0-10, B Sheehan 1-2, A Gaffney 0-5, T Clifford 0-1, M Nolan 0-1.		A Tallis 0-6, C O'Carroll 1-2, D O'Carroll 1-2, N Brennan 0-3, M Kenny 0-1, B Fitzpatrick 0-1.	Referee: J Kennedy

3 October 2021 First round	Erin's Own	4-11 - 2-22	Tullaroan	UPMC Nowlan Park
	J Buggy 2-5, S Daly 1-1, J Down 1-0, M Boran 0-2, C Fogarty 0-2, S Feehan 0-1.		S Walsh 0-9, D Simpson 1-2, J Walton 0-4, M Keoghan 1-0, T Dunne 0-2, P Walsh 0-1, T Walsh 0-1, B Walton 0-1, B Gaffney 0-1, J Moore 0-1.	Referee: M O'Sullivan

=== Relegation playoffs ===
16 October 2021 Semi-final	Rower-Inistioge	1-15 - 3-18	Lisdowney	Páirc Shéamuis Stiophán
	J Walsh 0-8, P Lyng 1-1, J Ryan 0-3, E O'Brien 0-1, K Murphy 0-1, M Galavan 0-1.		A Tallis 3-4, C O'Carroll 0-5, D O'Carroll 0-2, V Fitzpatrick 0-2, N Brennan 0-1, M Kenny 0-1, C Jordan 0-1, B Kavanagh 0-1, S Phelan 0-1.

16 October 2021 Semi-final	Graigue-Ballycallan	3-16 - 1-18	Erin's Own	Páirc Lachtáin
	S Ryan (1-7, 0-6 frees); B Ryan (0-4, 0-1 line-ball); C Murphy (0-2, 0-1 free); B Murphy (1-0); J Roberts (1-0); C Hoyne (0-1, free) and T Dunphy & S Butler (0-1 each).	Report	J Buggy (0-8, 0-6 frees); M Murphy (1-1); S Feehan (0-4); S Daly & C Fogarty (0-2 each) and J Dowd (0-1).

30 October 2021 Final	Rower-Inistioge	0-09 - 1-11	Erin's Own	Clara GAA Grounds
	J Walsh (0-4, 0-3 frees); T Doyle, R Leahy, E O’Brien, J Ryan & M Galavan (free) 0-1 each).	Report	M Murphy (1-5, 1-0 penalty, 0-3 frees & 0-1 ’65); J Buggy (0-3, 0-2 frees & 0-1 ’65); C Fogarty, J Dowd & S Daly (0-1, each).

=== Quarter-finals ===
9 October 2021 Quarter-final	Mullinavat	0-19 - 2-19	O'Loughlin Gaels	Páirc na Seamróg
	J Walsh 0-10, G Malone 0-3, P Gahan 0-2, A Mansfield 0-2, W O'Dwyer 0-1, P Dempsey 0-1.	Report	M Bergin 1-10, P Deegan 1-1, P Butler 0-2, C Kelly 0-2, S Murphy 0-1, J Molloy 0-1, J Nolan 0-1, E O'Shea 0-1.

10 October 2021 Quarter-final	Bennettsbridge	1-15 - 0-27	Ballyhale Shamrocks	UPMC Nowlan Park
	N Cleere (0-5, 0-5f), J Cleere (1-0), C Brennan (0-3), K Brennan (0-2, 0-1f), S Morrissey (0-2), W Murphy, K Blanchfield and H O'Neill (0-1 each)	Report	TJ Reid (0-6, 0-4f), E Cody (0-6), J Cuddihy (0-4), C Fennelly, B Cody and R Corcoran (0-3 each), L Barron and B Cody (0-2 each)

10 October 2021 Quarter-final	James Stephens	2-16 - 2-15	Dicksboro	UPMC Nowlan Park
	C Kenny (0-6, 0-1f), E Guilfoyle (0-5, 0-5f), T O'Dwyer and S Donohue (1-0 each), M Ruth (0-3), N Brassil and L Scanlon (0-1 each)	Report	S Stapleton (0-7, 0-5f), A Gaffney (1-1), A Nolan (1-0), B Sheehan (0-2), C Buckley (0-1, 0-1f), R Fitzpatrick, T Clifford, L Moore and M Nolan (0-1 each).

10 October 2021 Quarter-final	Clara	2-19 - 1-29 (aet)	Tullaroan	St. John's Park
	C O'Shea 0-7, C Bolger 1-1, P Nolan 1-1, L Ryan 0-2, J Murphy 0-2, P Cody 0-2, D Langton 0-1, J Kehoe 0-1, P Cody 0-1, M O'Connell 0-1.		S Walsh 0-12, P Walsh 0-7, T Walsh 1-1, D Simpson 0-2, J Walton 0-2, J Moore 0-1, T Dunne 0-1, B Gaffney 0-1, M Keoghan 0-1, N Walton 0-1.

=== Semi-finals ===
24 October 2021 Semi-final	O'Loughlin Gaels	1-18 - 0-18	Tullaroan	UPMC Nowlan Park
	M Bergin (0-9, 6 frees); O Wall (1-1); C Heary, P Deegan & R Buckley (0-2 each); C Loy & D Fogarty (0-1 each).	Report	S Walsh (0-10, 8 frees); T Dunne (0-3); D Simpson (0-2); M Keoghan, P Walsh & J Moore (0-1 each).	Referee: D Hughes

24 October 2021 Semi-final	Ballyhale Shamrocks	2-20 - 1-17	James Stephens	UPMC Nowlan Park
	TJ Reid (1-11, 7 frees, 1 pen); E Cody (1-3); A Mullen & R Corcoran (0-2 each); B Cody & E Shefflin (0-1 each).	Report	E Guilfoyle (1-3, 2 frees); N Brassil (0-3, 3 frees); Matt Ruth, C Browne, L Scanlon & C Kenny (2 frees) (0-2 each); T O'Dwyer, C Kenny & M Drennan (0-1 each).	Referee: G Quilty

=== Final ===
7 November 2021 Final	O'Loughlin Gaels	3-15 - 3-19	Ballyhale Shamrocks	UPMC Nowlan Park
	P Deegan 2-3, M Bergin 0-5 (4fs 1 65), O Wall 1-2, C Heary 0-2, J Molloy, R Buckley, E O'Shea all 0-1 each.	Report	TJ Reid 0-9 (4fs, 2 65s), A Mullen, J Cuddihy 1-1 each, R Corcoran 0-3, B Butler 1-0, B Cody 0-2, E Reid, R Reid, D Corcoran all 0-1 each	Referee: P Behan

== Championship statistics ==
=== Top scorers ===
Overall

Rank	Player	Club	Tally	Total	Matches	Average
1	T. J. Reid	Ballyhale Shamrocks	1-31	34	4	8.50
2	Shane Walsh	Tullaroan	0-31	31	3	10.33
3	Mark Bergin	O'Loughlin Gaels	1-26	29	4	7.25
4	Seán Ryan	Graigue-Ballycallan	2-16	22	2	11.00
4	Jack Buggy	Erin's Own	2-16	22	3	7.33
6	Jack Walsh	Rower-Inistioge	0-21	21	3	7.00
7	Paddy Deegan	O'Loughlin Gaels	3-11	20	4	5.00
8	Aidan Tallis	Lisdowney	3-10	19	2	9.50
9	Owen Wall	O'Loughlin Gaels	4-05	17	4	4.25
9	Shane Stapleton	Dicksboro	0-17	17	2	8.50

In a single game

Rank	Player	Club	Tally	Total	Opposition
1	T. J. Reid	Ballyhale Shamrocks	1-11	14	James Stephens
2	Aidan Tallis	Lisdowney	3-04	13	Rower-Inistioge
2	Mark Bergin	O'Loughlin Gaels	1-10	13	Mullinavat
4	Seán Ryan	Graigue-Ballycallan	1-09	12	Ballyhale Shamrocks
5	Jack Buggy	Erin's Own	2-05	11	Tullaroan
6	Seán Ryan	Graigue-Ballycallan	1-07	10	Erin's Own
6	Shane Stapleton	Dicksboro	0-10	10	Lisdowney
6	John Walsh	Mullinavat	0-10	10	O'Loughlin Gaels
6	Shane Walsh	Tullaroan	0-10	10	O'Loughlin Gaels
10	Paddy Deegan	O'Loughlin Gaels	2-03	9	Ballyhale Shamrocks
10	Jack Walsh	Rower-Inistioge	0-09	9	O'Loughlin Gaels
10	Shane Walsh	Tullaroan	0-09	9	Erin's Own
10	Mark Bergin	O'Loughlin Gaels	0-09	9	Tullaroan
10	T. J. Reid	Ballyhale Shamrocks	0-09	9	O'Loughlin Gaels
