= Martin Keoghan =

Irish hurler (born 1998)

Personal information
- Native name: Máirtín Ó Ceocháin (Irish)
- Nickname: Mossy
- Born: 9 December 1998 (age 27) Tullaroan, County Kilkenny, Ireland
- Occupation: Secondary school teacher
- Height: 6 ft 0 in (183 cm)

Sport
- Sport: Hurling
- Position: Centre-forward
Club
- Years: Club
- 2016-present: Tullaroan
Club titles
- Kilkenny titles: 0
College
- Years: College
- 2017-2021: University of Limerick
College titles
- Fitzgibbon titles: 0
Inter-county*
Years	County	Apps (scores)
2018-present	Kilkenny	44 (19-55)
Inter-county titles
- Leinster titles: 6
- All-Irelands: 0
- NHL: 2
- All Stars: 1
- *Inter County team apps and scores correct as of 20:47, 27 April 2026.

Martin Keoghan (born 9 December 1998) is an Irish hurler. At club level, he plays with Tullaroan and at inter-county level with the Kilkenny senior hurling team.

== Career ==
Keoghan played hurling at all levels during his time as a student at St Kieran's College in Kilkenny. As a member of the college's senior hurling team, he won three consecutive Leinster PPS SAHC medals, as well as back-to-back All-Ireland PPS SAHC medals in 2015 and 2016. Keoghan later lined out with University of Limerick in the Fitzgibbon Cup.

At club level, Keoghan first played for Tullaroan at juvenile and underage levels, winning Kilkenny MAHC and Kilkenny U21BHC titles in 2016. He also made his adult team debut that year and won Kilkenny IHC and Leinster Club IHC medals in 2019. Keoghan scored 2-01 from centre-forward when Tullaroan beat Fr O'Neill's by 3–19 to 5–12 in the 2020 All-Ireland Club IHC final.

At inter-county level, Keoghan first played for Kilkenny at minor level in 2016. He progressed to the under-21 team and was part of the Kilkenny team beaten by Limerick in the 2017 All-Ireland under-21 final. Keoghan was also part of the intermediate team that year and won an All-Ireland IHC medal after a 2–23 to 2–18 defeat of Cork.

Keoghan made his senior team debut in the 2018 Walsh Cup. He claimed his first senior silverware in 2018 when Kilkenny claimed the National Hurling League title, before adding a second league title to his collection in 2021. Keoghan won six consecutive Leinster SHC medals between 2020 and 2025. He was also part of the Kilkenny team beaten by Limerick in back-to-back All-Ireland finals in 2022 and 2023.

Keoghan won his first All Star Award in 2025, following in the footsteps of his father, Liam Keoghan, who won an All Star in 1997.

== Career statistics ==
As of 24 May 2026

Team	Year	National League			Leinster		All-Ireland		Total	
Team	Year	Division	Apps	Score	Apps	Score	Apps	Score	Apps	Score
Kilkenny	2018	Division 1A	7	0-10	5	0-02	1	0-00	13	0-12
Kilkenny	2019	Division 1A	5	0-01	1	0-00	0	0-00	6	0-01
Kilkenny	2020	Division 1B	4	0-04	2	0-02	1	1-01	7	1-07
Kilkenny	2021	Division 1B	4	2-07	2	0-03	1	0-00	7	2-10
Kilkenny	2022	Division 1B	6	5-08	5	3-03	2	2-01	13	10-12
Kilkenny	2023	Division 1B	6	2-10	6	5-09	2	0-00	14	7-19
Kilkenny	2024	Division 1A	6	0-07	6	0-16	1	0-00	13	0-23
Kilkenny	2025	Division 1A	6	2-24	6	6-08	1	0-06	13	8-38
Kilkenny	2026	Division 1A	6	3-09	5	2-12	—		11	5-21
Total			50	14-80	38	16-55	9	3-08	97	33-143

== Honours ==
St Kieran's College

- All-Ireland PPS Senior Hurling Championship: 2015, 2016
- Leinster PPS Senior Hurling Championship: 2015, 2016, 2017

Tullaroan

- All-Ireland Intermediate Club Hurling Championship: 2020
- Leinster Intermediate Club Hurling Championship: 2019
- Kilkenny Intermediate Hurling Championship: 2019
- Kilkenny Under-21 B Hurling Championship: 2016
- Kilkenny Minor Hurling Championship: 2016

Kilkenny

- Leinster Senior Hurling Championship: 2020, 2021, 2022, 2023, 2024, 2025
- National Hurling League: 2018, 2021
- All-Ireland Intermediate Hurling Championship: 2017
- Leinster Intermediate Hurling Championship: 2017
- Leinster Under-21 Hurling Championship: 2017

Individual

- The Sunday Game Team of the Year (1): 2025
- All Star Award (1): 2025
