= Tommy Walsh (hurler, born 1998) =

Irish hurler

Personal information
- Native name: Tomás Breathnach (Irish)
- Born: 28 February 1998 (age 28) Tullaroan, County Kilkenny, Ireland
- Occupation: Student
- Height: 6 ft 0 in (183 cm)

Sport
- Sport: Hurling
- Position: Left corner-back
Club
- Years: Club
- Tullaroan
Club titles
- Kilkenny titles: 0
College
- Years: College
- 2017-present: Waterford Institute of Technology
College titles
- Fitzgibbon titles: 0
Inter-county*
Years	County	Apps (scores)
2018–present	Kilkenny	37 (0-04)
Inter-county titles
- Leinster titles: 4
- All-Irelands: 0
- NHL: 0
- All Stars: 0
- *Inter County team apps and scores correct as of 21:57, 17 July 2021.

Thomas Walsh (born 28 February 1998) is an Irish hurler who plays for Kilkenny Intermediate Championship club Tullaroan and at inter-county level with the Kilkenny senior hurling team. He usually lines out as a left corner-back.

== Playing career ==
=== Tullaroan ===
Walsh joined the Tullaroan club at a young age and played in all grades at juvenile and underage levels before joining the club's top adult team.

=== Kilkenny ===
==== Minor and under-21 ====
Walsh first lined out for Kilkenny as a member of the minor team during the 2014 Leinster Championship. He made his first appearance at right corner-back in a 2–08 to 0–03 defeat by Dublin on 26 April 2014. Walsh missed the subsequent Leinster final defeat of Dublin, but was restored to the starting fifteen for the All-Ireland final against Limerick on 7 September. He collected a winners' medal from right corner-back following the 2–17 to 0–19 victory.

For the 2015 Leinster Championship, Walsh was switched to the full-back position. On 5 July 2015, he won a Leinster Championship medal on the field of play following a 1–17 to 1–15 defeat of Dublin in the final.

Walsh was eligible for the minor grade for a third consecutive year in 2016. He made his last appearance for the team on 14 May in a 2–18 to 1–19 defeat by Dublin.

Walsh progressed onto the Kilkenny under-21 for the 2017 Leinster Championship. He made his first appearance for the team on 31 May 2017 when he lined out in a 0–21 to 0–16 defeat of Dublin. Walsh won a Leinster Championship medal on 5 July after Kilkenny's 0–30 to 1–15 defeat of Wexford in the final. On 9 September, he lined out at left wing-back when Kilkenny suffered a 0–17 to 0–11 defeat by Limerick in the All-Ireland final.

==== Senior ====
Walsh joined the Kilkenny senior team prior to the start of the 2018 National League. He was named among the substitutes for Kilkenny's opening league game against Cork on 27 January 2018. Walsh remained as a member of the extended panel for the Leinster Championship.

Walsh made his first appearance for the Kilkenny senior team on 27 January 2019 when he lined out at left corner-back in a 2–18 to 0–17 defeat of Cork. He made his first championship appearance on 11 May when he was at left corner-back in Kilkenny's 2–23 to 1–21 defeat of Dublin.

== Personal life ==
His cousin, Tommy, won nine All-Ireland medals with Kilkenny. Another cousin, Pádraig Walsh, is a current member of the Kilkenny team.

== Career statistics ==
As of match played 17 July 2021.

Team	Year	National League			Leinster		All-Ireland		Total	
Team	Year	Division	Apps	Score	Apps	Score	Apps	Score	Apps	Score
Kilkenny	2018	Division 1A	0	0-00	0	0-00	0	0-00	0	0-00
Kilkenny	2019	Division 1A	6	0-00	3	0-01	0	0-00	9	0-01
Kilkenny	2020	Division 1B	3	0-00	1	0-00	1	0-00	5	0-00
Kilkenny	2021	Division 1B	4	0-00	2	0-01	0	0-00	6	0-01
Career total			13	0-00	6	0-02	1	0-00	20	0-02

== Honours ==
St Kieran's College

- All-Ireland Colleges Senior Hurling Championship: 2014, 2015, 2016 (c)
- Leinster Colleges Senior Hurling Championship: 2015, 2016 (c)

Kilkenny

- Leinster Senior Hurling Championship: 2020, 2021
- Leinster Under-21 Hurling Championship: 2017
- All-Ireland Minor Hurling Championship: 2014
- Leinster Minor Hurling Championship: 2014, 2015

Tullaroan

- Kilkenny Intermediate Hurling Championship: 2019
- Leinster Intermediate Club Hurling Championship: 2019
- All-Ireland Intermediate Club Hurling Championship: 2020
