= Aidan Tallis =

Irish hurler (born 2002)

Personal information
- Native name: Aodán Taillis (Irish)
- Born: 2002 (age 23–24) Lisdowney, County Kilkenny, Ireland
- Height: 5 ft 11 in (180 cm)

Sport
- Sport: Hurling
- Position: Goalkeeper
Club
- Years: Club
- Lisdowney
Club titles
- Kilkenny titles: 0
Inter-county*
Years	County	Apps (scores)
2023-	Kilkenny	0 (0-00)
Inter-county titles
- Leinster titles: 1
- All-Irelands: 0
- NHL: 0
- All Stars: 0
- *Inter County team apps and scores correct as of 12:25, 4 February 2022.

Aidan Tallis (born 2002) is an Irish hurler. At the club level he plays with Lidsowney and at inter-county level with the Kilkenny senior hurling team.

== Career ==
Tallis first played hurling at juvenile and underage levels with the Lisdowney club, while also playing as a schoolboy with Coláiste Mhuire in Johnstown. He progressed to adult level with his club and was top scorer when Lisdowney beat Thomastown to win the Kilkenny IHC title in 2020.

Tallis first appeared on the inter-county scene as goalkeeper on the Kilkenny minor hurling team that lost the 2019 All-Ireland minor final to Galway. He progressed to the under-20 team and was again in goal when Kilkenny beat Limerick in the 2022 All-Ireland under-20 final.

Tallis first played for the senior team during the 2023 Walsh Cup.

== Career statistics ==
As of 26 February 2023.

Team	Year	National League			Leinster		All-Ireland		Total	
Team	Year	Division	Apps	Score	Apps	Score	Apps	Score	Apps	Score
Kilkenny	2023	Division 1B	2	0-00	0	0-00	0	0-00	2	0-00
Career total			2	0-00	0	0-00	0	0-00	2	0-00

== Honours ==
Lisdowney

- Kilkenny Intermediate Hurling Championship: 2020, 2024

Kilkenny

- Leinster Senior Hurling Championship: 2023, 2024, 2025
- All-Ireland Under-20 Hurling Championship: 2022
- Leinster Under-20 Hurling Championship: 2022
