= Pádraig Walsh =

Irish hurler (born 1992)

Personal information
- Native name: Pádraig Breathnach (Irish)
- Born: 12 March 1992 (age 34) Tullaroan, County Kilkenny, Ireland
- Occupation: Primary school teacher
- Height: 5 ft 11 in (180 cm)

Sport
- Sport: Hurling
- Position: Midfield
Club
- Years: Club
- 2009-present: Tullaroan
Club titles
- Kilkenny titles: 0
College
- Years: College
- 2010-2014: University of Limerick
College titles
- Fitzgibbon titles: 0
Inter-county*
Years	County	Apps (scores)
2012-2023	Kilkenny	56 (0-42)
Inter-county titles
- Leinster titles: 7
- All-Irelands: 2
- NHL: 5
- All Stars: 2
- *Inter County team apps and scores correct as of 17:16, 06 November 2025.

Pádraig Walsh (born 12 March 1992) is an Irish hurler who plays for Kilkenny Senior Championship club Tullaroan and previously at inter-county level with the Kilkenny senior hurling team. He usually lines out as a centre back

== Playing career ==
=== St. Kieran's College ===
Walsh first came to prominence as a hurler with St. Kieran's College in Kilkenny. He played in every grade of hurling before eventually joining the college's senior hurling team. On 3 March 2010, he lined out at left wing-forward when St. Kieran's College faced Kilkenny CBS in the Leinster final. Walsh scored a 44th-minute goal to secure a 2–14 to 1–10 victory. He was again at left wing-forward for the All-Ireland final against Ardscoil Rís from Limerick. Walsh scored three points from play and collected a winners' medal following the 2–11 to 2–08 victory. The victory gave Walsh an All-Ireland medal.

=== Tullaroan ===
Walsh joined the Tullaroan club at a young age and played in all grades at juvenile and underage levels before joining the club's top adult team. He made his first appearance for the club's senior team on 20 September 2009 in a 1–13 to 0–15 defeat by Graigue-Ballycallan.

On 28 October 2018, Walsh lined out in his first decider at adult level when Tullaroan faced Graigue-Ballycallan in the final of the Kilkenny Intermediate Championship. He scored 1-02, including a 15th-minute penalty, in the 2–16 to 2–13 defeat.

On 27 October 2019, Walsh lined out in a second successive final when Tullaoran qualified to play Thomastown. He ended the game with a winners' medal after the 3–18 to 0–21 victory. On 30 November 2019, Walsh claimed a Leinster Club Championship medal after a 2–25 to 2–13 defeat of Seir Kieran in the final.

=== Kilkenny ===
==== Minor and under-21 ====
Walsh first lined out for Kilkenny as a member of the minor team during the 2009 Leinster Championship. He was an unused substitute for the entire provincial campaign, however, he collected a Leinster Championship on 5 July following a 1–19 to 0–11 defeat of Wexford in the final. Walsh was again included amongst the substitutes for the All-Ireland final against Galway on 6 September. He was introduced as a 56th-minute substitute for Geoff Brennan in the 2–15 to 2–11 defeat.

Walsh was eligible for the minor grade again the following year and established himself as a regular member of the starting fifteen. On 4 July 2010, he won a second successive Leinster Championship medal following a 1–20 to 0–10 defeat of Dublin in the final. On 5 September, Walsh was at centre-forward when Galway faced Clare in the All-Ireland final. He was substituted by Paul Holden in the 39th minute but collected a winners' medal following the 2–10 to 0–14 victory.

Two years later Walsh was a key member of the Kilkenny under-21 team. He won his sole Leinster medal that year following a 4–24 to 1-13 trouncing of Laois. Kilkenny later faced Clare in the All-Ireland decider. A powerful second-half display, in which they outscored Kilkenny 1–10 to 0–4, saw Clare take their second ever All-Ireland under-21 crown.

On 7 June 2011, Walsh made his first appearance for the Kilkenny under-21 team. After starting the game on the bench, he was introduced as a substitute in the 1–16 to 2–12 defeat by Wexford in the Leinster Championship.

On 11 July 2012, Walsh won a Leinster Championship medal from centre-forward after scoring six points in Kilkenny's 4–24 to 1–13 defeat of Laois in the final. On 15 September, he was again at centre-forward for Kilkenny's 2–17 to 2–11 defeat by Clare in the All-Ireland final.

Walsh was moved from the forwards to the right wing-back position for the 2013 Leinster Championship. He made his last appearance in the under-21 grade on 11 July 2013 when Kilkenny suffered a 1–21 to 0–21 defeat by Wexford in the Leinster final.

==== Senior ====
Walsh was added to the Kilkenny senior team as a substitute for their National Hurling League semi-final against Clare on 22 April 2012. He was again included amongst the substitutes for the final against Cork on 6 May. Walsh remained in the bench but collected a winners' medal following the 3–21 to 0–16 victory. He failed to be included on the Kilkenny panel for the Leinster Championship.

On 18 March 2013, Walsh made his first competitive appearance at senior level. He was introduced as a 24th-minute substitute for Jackie Tyrrell in a 2–15 to 0–15 defeat of Waterford in the National League. He won a second consecutive National League medal as a non-playing substitute on 5 May following Kilkenny's 2–17 to 0–20 defeat of Tipperary in the final. Walsh made his first appearance in the Leinster Championship on 29 June when he came on as a 60th-minute substitute for Jackie Tyrrell at right corner-back in a 1–16 to 0–16 defeat by Dublin.

On 4 May 2014, Walsh was at midfield when Kilkenny faced Tipperary in the National League final. He claimed his third winners' medal - his first on the field of play - following the 2–25 to 1–27 victory. On 6 July, Walsh won a Leinster Championship medal after scoring two points from centre-forward in Kilkenny's 0–24 to 1–09 defeat of Dublin in the final. He was dropped from the starting fifteen for the All-Ireland final against Tipperary on 7 September. He was introduced as a 61st-minute substitute for Joey Holden at left corner-back in the 3–22 to 1–28 draw. Walsh's improved form earned him a place on the starting fifteen at right wing-back for the replay on 27 September. He claimed an All-Ireland medal following the 2–17 to 2–14 victory.

On 5 July 2015, Walsh won a second consecutive Leinster Championship when he lined out at right wing-back in Kilkenny's 1–23 to 2–17 defeat of Galway in the final. On 6 September, he was again at right wing-back when Kilkenny and Galway renewed their rivalry in the All-Ireland final. Walsh collected a second successive winners' medal following the 1–22 to 1–18 victory.

Walsh won a third successive Leinster Championship medal on 3 July 2016. He was in his usual position of right wing-back for the 1–26 to 0–22 defeat of Galway in the final. Kilkenny subsequently qualified for a third successive All-Ireland final on 4 September. Walsh scored two points from right wing-back in the 2–29 to 2–20 defeat by Tipperary. He ended the season by being named in the right wing-back position on the All-Star team.

On 8 April 2018, Walsh won a fourth National League medal. He was at full-back for the 2–23 to 2–17 defeat of Tipperary in the final. On 1 July, he was again at full-back when Kilkenny drew 0-18 apiece with Galway in the Leinster final. The replay a week later saw Kilkenny suffer a 1–28 to 3–15 defeat.

On 30 June 2019, Walsh lined out at left corner-back when Kilkenny suffered a 1–23 to 0–23 defeat by Wexford in the Leinster final. On 18 August 2019, he was selected at centre-back when Kilkenny faced Tipperary in the All-Ireland final. Walsh ended the game on the losing side after a 3–25 to 0–20 defeat.

On 16 November 2023, Walsh announced his retirement form inter-county hurling, his reason being to give a few more good years for his club Tullaroan Gaa.

== Personal life ==
Walsh's grandfather was Paddy Grace, a two-time All-Ireland medal-winner with Kilkenny who served as secretary of the Kilkenny County Board for 37 years. His older brother, Tommy, won nine All-Ireland medals with Kilkenny. His sister, Grace, is an All-Ireland medal-winner with the Kilkenny senior camogie team.

== Career statistics ==
As of match played 17 July 2021.

Team	Year	National League			Leinster		All-Ireland		Total	
Team	Year	Division	Apps	Score	Apps	Score	Apps	Score	Apps	Score
Kilkenny	2012	Division 1A	0	0-00	—		—		0	0-00
Kilkenny	2013	Division 1A	2	0-00	1	0-00	0	0-00	3	0-00
Kilkenny	2014	Division 1A	8	0-12	4	0-07	3	0-03	15	0-22
Kilkenny	2015	Division 1A	3	0-03	2	0-00	2	0-01	7	0-04
Kilkenny	2016	Division 1A	6	0-06	2	0-01	3	0-04	11	0-11
Kilkenny	2017	Division 1A	6	0-00	1	0-00	2	0-00	9	0-00
Kilkenny	2018	Division 1A	7	0-01	6	0-01	1	0-00	14	0-02
Kilkenny	2019	Division 1A	4	0-04	5	0-02	2	0-01	11	0-07
Kilkenny	2020	Division 1B	1	0-00	2	0-01	1	0-00	4	0-01
Kilkenny	2021	Division 1B	5	0-02	2	0-00	0	0-00	7	0-02
Total			42	0-28	25	0-12	14	0-09	81	0-49

== Honours ==
St. Kieran's College

- All-Ireland Colleges Senior Hurling Championship (1): 2010
- Leinster Colleges Senior Hurling Championship (1): 2010

Tullaroan

- Kilkenny Intermediate Hurling Championship: 2019
- Leinster Intermediate Club Hurling Championship: 2019
- All-Ireland Intermediate Club Hurling Championship: 2020

Kilkenny

- All-Ireland Senior Hurling Championship: 2014, 2015
- Leinster Senior Hurling Championship: 2014, 2015, 2016, 2020, 2021, 2022, 2023
- National Hurling League: 2012, 2013, 2014, 2018, 2021
- Walsh Cup: 2014
- Leinster Under-21 Hurling Championship: 2012
- All-Ireland Minor Hurling Championship: 2010
- Leinster Minor Hurling Championship: 2009, 2010

=== Individual ===
Awards

- GAA-GPA All-Star Award: 2016, 2019
