= 2017 Kilkenny Intermediate Hurling Championship =

- Dates: 16 September 2017 – 22 October 2017
- Teams: 12
- Sponsor: Michael Lyng Motors
- Champions: St. Patrick's Ballyragget (2nd title); Stephen Staunton (captain); Jim Lyng (manager)
- Runners-up: Graigue-Ballycallan
- Relegated: Dunnamaggin

Tournament statistics
- Matches played: 14
- Goals scored: 43 (3.07 per match)
- Points scored: 413 (29.5 per match)
- Top scorer(s): Kevin Kelly (4-27)

The 2017 Kilkenny Intermediate Hurling Championship was the 53rd staging of the Kilkenny Intermediate Hurling Championship since its establishment by the Kilkenny County Board in 1929. The championship began on 16 September 2017 and ended on 22 October 2017.

On 22 October 2017, St. Patrick's Ballyragget won the championship after a 1–19 to 2–10 defeat of Graigue-Ballycallan in the final at Nowlan Park. It was their second championship overall and their first title since 1979.

St. Patrick's Ballyragget's Kevin Kelly was the championship's top scorer with 4-27.

== Team changes ==
=== To Championship ===
Promoted from the Kilkenny Junior Hurling Championship

- Mooncoin

Relegated from the Kilkenny Senior Hurling Championship

- Fenians

=== From Championship ===
Promoted to the Kilkenny Senior Hurling Championship

- Carrickshock

Relegated to the Kilkenny Junior Hurling Championship

- Conahy Shamrocks

== Results ==
=== First round ===
16 September 2017 First round	Tullogher-Rosbercon	0-13 - 0-13	Lisdowney	Gowran
	C O'Donoghue 0-7, C Hennessy 0-3, W Walsh 0-2, K Hennessy 0-1.		A Fogarty 0-8, E Kenny 0-2, E Walsh 0-1, V Fitzpatrick 0-1, B Kavanagh 0-1.

16 September 2017 First round	Graigue-Ballycallan	2-15 - 2-08	St. Lachtain's	Polo Grounds, Jenkinstown
	B Ryan 2-3, S Ryan 0-8, B Murphy 0-1, J Roberts 0-1, R Keoghan 0-1, C Prendeville 0-1.		S Donnelly 1-2, L Hickey 1-1, N McGree 0-1, B Quinn 0-1, D Lennon 0-1, J Fitzpatrick 0-1, J Maher 0-1.

17 September 2017 First round	Young Irelands	1-18 - 0-17	Fenians	Páirc Lachtáin, Freshford
	P Holden 0-9, S Carey 1-3, S Kehoe 0-3, JP Treacy 0-2, P Kehoe 0-1.		M Webster 0-6, K Grehan 0-3, C Tobin 0-3, W Brennan 0-2, JJ Delaney 0-1, D Tobin 0-1, K Power 0-1.

17 September 2017 First round	Dunnamaggin	0-15 - 3-16	Mooncoin	Mullinavat
	K Moore 0-10, D Fitzpatrick 0-2, J Fitzpatrick 0-1, E Kearney 0-1, M Cody 0-1.		E Ryan 1-4, P Walsh 1-4, E Hennebery 1-0, K Crowley 0-2, D Purcell 0-2, P Hennebery 0-2, L Hennebery 0-2.

24 September 2017 First round replay	Tullogher-Rosbercon	1-14 - 2-22	Lisdowney	Gowran
	C O'Donoghue 0-10, T Cullinane 1-1, W Walsh 0-1, P Hartley 0-1, C Hennessy 0-1.		A Fogarty 2-6, P O'Carroll 0-4, B Kavanagh 0-4, C Mackey 0-3, V Fitzpatrick 0-2, W Kenny 0-1, E Kenny 0-1, N Brennan 0-1.

=== Relegation playoff ===
7 October 2017 Playoff	St. Lachtain's	2-09 - 0-15	Dunnamaggin	Danesfort
	S Donnelly 1-3, D Lennon 1-1, B Kennedy 0-2, B Quinn 0-1, S Rafter 0-1, R Dowling 0-1.		K Moore 0-8, P Delaney 0-1, E Kearney 0-1, V Costelloe 0-1, D Fitzpatrick 0-1, J Fitzpatrick 0-1, T Maher 0-1, B McCormack 0-1.

14 October 2017 Playoff replay	St. Lachtain's	2-10 - 1-11	Dunnamaggin	Danesfort
	L Hickey 1-5, S Donnelly 1-2, N McGree 0-1, P White 0-1, D Brennan 0-1.		K Moore 1-6, E Kearney 0-2, M Cody 0-1, P Delaney 0-1, R Coffey 0-1.

=== Quarter-finals ===
23 September 2017 Quarter-final	Glenmore	1-15 - 2-10	Mooncoin	Mullinavat
	A Murphy 1-7, E Murphy 0-4, M Phelan 0-2, E Verker 0-2.		E Ryan 0-6, A Walsh 1-0, D Purcell 1-0, D Kearns 0-1, M Grace 0-1, E Hennebery 0-1, K Crowley 0-1.

23 September 2017 Quarter-final	Tullaroan	3-18 - 1-20	Young Irelands	Páirc Shéamuis Stiopháin, Kilkenny
	S Walsh 1-10, B Gaffney 1-1, Pádraig Walsh 0-4, Peter Walsh 1-0, T Walsh 0-2, J Keoghan 0-1.		P Holden 0-11, S Carey 1-1, JP Treacy 0-3, S Kehoe 0-3, P Kehoe 0-1, S Nolan 0-1.

24 September 2017 Quarter-final	Thomastown	1-17 - 3-15	Graigue-Ballycallan	St. John's Park, Kilkenny
	JJ Farrell 0-6, R Donnelly 0-5, A Burke 1-0, J Donnelly 0-3, J Barron 0-1, D Caulfield 0-1, D Barron 0-1.		S Ryan 0-8, B Ryan 1-1, C Prendeville 1-1, J Roberts 1-0, C Hoyne 0-2, E Brennan 0-2, R Keoghan 0-1.

1 October 2017 Quarter-final	St. Patrick's Ballyragget	2-13 - 1-12	Lisdowney	Páirc Lachtáin, Freshford
	K Kelly 1-6, B Phelan 1-0, S Kenny 0-2, B Staunton 0-2, M Brennan 0-1, R Healy 0-1, J Brennan 0-1.		A Fogarty 0-8, M Phelan 1-0, E Walsh 0-2, R Hickey 0-1, E Kenny 0-1.

=== Semi-finals ===
8 October 2017 Semi-final	Glenmore	2-12 - 2-18	Graigue-Ballycallan	Nowlan Park, Kilkenny
	A Murphy 2-7, E Murphy 0-2, P Roche 0-1, E Vereker 0-1, G Aylward 0-1.		S Ryan 1-9, B Ryan 1-1, E Brennan 0-3, J Roberts 0-2, W O'Connor 0-1, B Murphy 0-1, V Teehan 0-1.

8 October 2017 Semi-final	Tullaroan	2-21 - 4-17	St. Patrick's Ballyragget	Nowlan Park, Kilkenny
	S Walsh 0-13, Pádraig Walsh 1-2, Peter Walsh 1-0, J Walton 0-2, M Keoghan 0-2, T Walsh (M) 0-1, P Buggy 0-1.		K Kelly 3-11, B Phelan 1-1, Bill Staunton 0-2, M Brennan 0-1, Barry Staunton 0-1, J Gannon 0-1.

=== Final ===
22 October 2017 Final	St. Patrick's Ballyragget	1-19 - 2-10	Graigue-Ballycallan	Nowlan Park, Kilkenny
	K Kelly 0-10, B Phelan 1-1, J Brennan 0-3, M Brennan 0-2, J Gannon 0-1, P Brennan 0-1, Barry Staunton 0-1.		S Ryan 1-7, B Ryan 1-0, E Brennan 0-1, C Prendeville 0-1, B Murphy 0-1.	Referee: R Byrne (Glenmore)

== Championship statistics ==
=== Top scorers ===
Top scorers overall

Rank	Player	Club	Tally	Total	Matches	Average
1	Kevin Kelly	St. Patrick's Ballyragget	4-27	39	3	13.00
2	Seán Ryan	Graigue-Ballycallan	2-32	38	4	9.50
3	Aaron Fogarty	Lisdowney	2-22	28	3	9.33
4	Kenny Moore	Dunnamaggin	1-24	27	3	9.00
5	Shane Walsh	Tullaroan	1-23	26	2	13.00
6	Alan Murphy	Glenmore	3-14	23	2	11.50
7	Billy Ryan	Graigue-Ballycallan	5-05	20	4	5.00
7	Paul Holden	Young Irelands	0-20	20	2	10.00
8	Cian O'Donoghue	Tullogher-Rosbercon	0-17	17	2	8.50
9	Shane Donnelly	St. Lachtains'	3-07	16	3	5.33

Top scorers in a single game

Rank	Player	Club	Tally	Total	Opposition
1	Kevin Kelly	St. Patrick's Ballyragget	3-11	20	Tullaroan
2	Alan Murphy	Glenmore	2-07	13	Graigue-Ballycallan
2	Shane Walsh	Tullaroan	1-10	13	Young Irelands
2	Shane Walsh	Tullaroan	0-13	13	St. Patrick's Ballyragget
3	Aaron Fogarty	Lisdowney	2-06	12	Tullogher-Rosbercon
3	Seán Ryan	Graigue-Ballycallan	1-09	12	Glenmore
4	Paul Holden	Young Irelands	0-11	11	Tullaroan
5	Seán Ryan	Graigue-Ballycallan	1-07	10	St. Patrick's Ballyragget
5	Alan Murphy	Glenmore	1-07	10	Mooncoin
5	Kevin Kelly	St. Patrick's Ballyragget	0-10	10	Graigue-Ballycallan
5	Kenny Moore	Dunnamaggin	0-10	10	Mooncoin
5	Cian O'Donoghue	Tullogher-Rosbercon	0-10	10	Lisdowney
