= Tommy Walsh (hurler, born 1983) =

Kilkenny hurler

Personal information
- Native name: Tomás Breathnach (Irish)
- Born: 5 May 1983 (age 43) Tullaroan, County Kilkenny, Ireland
- Occupation: Bank official
- Height: 5 ft 8 in (173 cm)

Sport
- Sport: Hurling
- Position: Right half back
Club
- Years: Club
- 1999–: Tullaroan
Club titles
- Kilkenny titles: 1
- All-Ireland Titles: 1
Inter-county*
Years	County	Apps (scores)
2002–2014	Kilkenny	56 (1–36)
Inter-county titles
- Leinster titles: 10
- All-Irelands: 9
- NHL: 7
- All Stars: 9
- *Inter County team apps and scores correct as of 20:03, 10 May 2013.

Thomas Walsh (born 5 May 1983) is an Irish hurler who played as a right wing-back at senior level for the Kilkenny county team.

Born in Tullaroan, County Kilkenny, Walsh first played competitive hurling during his schooling at St Kieran's College. He arrived on the inter-county scene at the age of seventeen when he first linked up with the Kilkenny minor team, before later joining the under-21 side. He joined the senior panel during the 2002 championship. Walsh became a regular member of the starting fifteen the following year, and won nine All-Ireland medals (two as a non-playing substitute), ten Leinster medals and seven National League medals. He was an All-Ireland runner-up on two occasions.

At international level Walsh has played for the composite rules shinty-hurling team, captaining his country to the title in 2009. As a member of the Leinster inter-provincial team on a number of occasions (17 games), he won five Railway Cup medals. At club level Walsh continues to play with Tullaroan.

Walsh's grandfather, Paddy Grace, as well as his brother, Pádraig, have also enjoyed All-Ireland success with Kilkenny. His sister, Grace, is a key member of the Kilkenny senior camogie team.

Throughout his career Walsh made 56 championship appearances. He announced his retirement from inter-county hurling on 20 November 2014.

Walsh is one of the most successful players of all time. During his playing days he won nine consecutive All-Star awards, while he was later chosen as one of the 125 greatest hurlers of all time in a 2009 poll. That same year Walsh made a clean sweep of all the top individual awards, winning the All-Star, Texaco and GPA Hurler of the Year awards, while he was chosen on the Leinster team of the past twenty-five years.

== Playing career ==
Walsh's playing career was influenced by his paternal aunt Alice who has inspired him through every path of his career. Alice was known for her hockey career. It is true he would not be who he is today without her. Walsh's discipline on the pitch is inspired by his other aunt, Mary who is known for her all elbows approach.

=== Colleges ===
During his schooling at St Kieran's College in Kilkenny, Walsh established himself as a key member of the senior hurling team. In 1999 he won his first Leinster medal following a 3–13 to 1–11 defeat of Dublin Colleges.

Walsh added a second Leinster medal to his collection in 2000, as Dublin Colleges were defeated by 2–13 to 1–10. St Flannan's College provided the opposition in the subsequent All-Ireland decider. Having come close to beating the Ennis-based school at the same stage the previous year, St. Kieran's made no mistake this time and recorded a 1–10 to 0–9 victory, giving Walsh an All-Ireland medal.

=== University ===
During his studies at University College Cork, Walsh was an automatic inclusion on the college hurling team. In 2004, he was at left wing-back as UCC faced Waterford Institute of Technology in the final of the Fitzgibbon Cup. Against the wind, Waterford rallied with late scores to overhaul Cork, with a last minute free from Wexford senior Rory Jacob being the clinching score in an 0–11 to 0–9 defeat for Walsh's side.

=== Club ===
Walsh has been heavily involved with the Tullaroan club for many years. He enjoyed much success at juvenile level, claiming championship medals from primary school up to under-16 grades. The highlight of his juvenile career came in 1997 when he was part of the Féile na nGael-winning Tullaroan side.

In 1999 Walsh was a key member of the Tullaroan minor team. A 1–16 to 0–6 trouncing of Shamrocks gave him a championship medal.

Two years later in 2001 Walsh had joined the Tullaroan under-21 team that faced Carrickshock in the championship decider. A 1–14 apiece draw was the result on that occasion, however, Tullaroan claimed a 2–16 to 2–7 victory in the replay.

By this stage Walsh had joined the Tullaroan senior team. After playing a number of challenge and Byrne Cup games he later became a championship regular.

=== Minor and under-21 ===
Walsh first played for Kilkenny at the turn of the century when he joined the minor side. He won his sole Leinster medal in 2001 following a 3–16 to 1–9 trouncing of Wexford.

By 2003 Walsh was a key member of the Kilkenny under-21 team. He won his first Leinster medal that year following a 0–12 to 1–4 defeat of Dublin. Kilkenny later faced Galway in the All-Ireland decider. "The Cats" outsmarted a Galway side which struggled in attack and conceded a goal a minute into the second half. The 2–13 to 0–12 score line gave Walsh his first All-Ireland medal in the grade.

Walsh collected a second Leinster medal in 2004, as Wexford were downed once again by 0–16 to 2–3. The subsequent All-Ireland final between Kilkenny and old rivals Tipperary was a total mismatch. "The Cats" scored key goals early in the opening half, which helped power them to a 3–21 to 1–6 victory.

=== Senior ===
==== Beginnings ====
Walsh was just out of the minor grade when he was added to the Kilkenny senior panel in 2002. That year he shared in his county's Leinster and All-Ireland triumphs, however, Walsh was yet to make his debut.

In 2003 Walsh became a regular member of the starting fifteen during Kilkenny's successful run to the final of the National Hurling League. Kilkenny came back from eight points down to secure a stunning 5–14 to 5–13 extra-time defeat of Tipperary, with Walsh collecting his first league medal. He later made his senior championship debut on 7 June 2003 in a 3–16 to 0–10 Leinster semi-final defeat of Dublin. Walsh went on to collect his first Leinster medal on the field of play, as Kilkenny defeated Wexford by 2–23 to 2–12. The subsequent All-Ireland final on 14 September 2003 saw Kilkenny face Cork for the first time in four years. Both teams remained level for much of the game, exchanging tit-for-tat scores. A Setanta Ó hAilpín goal gave Cork the advantage, however, a Martin Comerford goal five minutes from the end settled the game as Kilkenny went on to win by 1–14 to 1–11. It was Walsh's first All-Ireland medal on the field of play. He was later honoured with his first All-Star award.

After facing a shock, last-minute 2–15 to 1–16 defeat by Wexford in the Leinster semi-final in 2004, Kilkenny worked their way through the qualifiers and lined out against Cork in the All-Ireland decider on 12 September 2004. The game was expected to be a classic, however, a rain-soaked day made conditions difficult as Kilkenny aimed to secure a third successive championship. The first half was a low-scoring affair and provided little excitement for fans, however, the second half saw Cork completely take over. For the last twenty-three minutes Cork scored nine unanswered points and went on to win the game by 0–17 to 0–9. Kilkenny ended the year with no silverware, however, Walsh was still presented with a second consecutive All-Star award.

Kilkenny were back in form in 2005, with Walsh winning a second National League medal following a 3–20 to 0–15 victory over Clare. "The Cats" later struggled against a wasteful Wexford side, however, a 0–22 to 1–16 victory gave Walsh a second Leinster medal. While a third successive All-Ireland showdown with Cork seemed likely, Galway defeated Kilkenny in the All-Ireland semi-final in one of the games of the decade. Walsh later added a third successive All-Star award to his collection.

==== Four-in-a-row ====
In 2006 Walsh added a third National League medal to his collection following a 3–11 to 0–14 victory over Limerick. He later won his third Leinster medal following another facile 1–23 to 1–12 victory over Wexford. On 3 September 2006 Kilkenny faced a Cork team who were presented with the opportunity to become the first side in nearly thirty years to secure three successive All-Ireland championships. Like previous encounters neither side took a considerable lead, however, Kilkenny had a vital goal from Aidan Fogarty. Cork were in arrears coming into the final few minutes, however, Ben O'Connor scored a late goal for Cork. It was too little too late as the Cats denied Cork on a score line of 1–16 to 1–13. Walsh, whose uncle died just a few hours before the game, collected his second All-Ireland medal. He rounded off the year once again by claiming a fourth successive All-Star award.

Walsh collected a fourth Leinster medal in 2007, as Kilkenny asserted their provincial dominance and defeated Wexford by 2–24 to 1–12. On 2 September 2007 Kilkenny faced defeated Munster finalists and surprise All-Ireland semi-final winners Limerick in the championship decider. Kilkenny got off to a flying start with Eddie Brennan and Henry Shefflin scoring two goals within the first ten minutes to set the tone. Limerick launched a second-half comeback, however, "the Cats" were too powerful and cruised to a 2–19 to 1–15 victory. It was Walsh's third All-Ireland medal. He was later presented with a fifth successive All-Star award.

Kilkenny secured the Leinster crown again in 2008, with Walsh collecting a fifth winners' medal following a 5–21 to 0–17 defeat of Wexford. On 8 September 2008 Kilkenny faced Waterford in the All-Ireland decider for the first time in forty-five years. In a disappointingly one-sided final, Kilkenny produced a near perfect seventy minutes as Waterford endured a nightmare afternoon. A 23-point winning margin, 3–24 from play, only two wides in the entire match and eight scorers in all with Eddie Brennan and Henry Shefflin leading the way in a 3–30 to 1–13 victory. It was Walsh's fourth All-Ireland medal, while a sixth consecutive All-Star quickly followed.

Walsh collected a fourth National League medal in 2009, as Kilkenny beat Tipperary by 2–26 to 4–17 with a thrilling extra-time victory. He later won a fifth successive Leinster medal, as new challengers Dublin were bested by 2–18 to 0–18. On 6 September Kilkenny were poised to become the second team ever in the history of hurling to win four successive All-Ireland championships when they faced Tipperary in the decider. For long periods Tipp looked the likely winners, however, late goals from Henry Shefflin and substitute Martin Comerford finally killed off their efforts to secure a 2–22 to 0–23 victory. Walsh had collected his fifth All-Ireland medal, however, the game was not without incident for him. A wild pull on him by Benny Dunne was punished with a red card. Walsh later collected a seventh successive All-Star award, while he also picked up the Texaco, Vodafone and GPA Hurler of the Year awards.

==== Continued dominance ====
In 2010 Kilkenny defeated Galway in an eagerly-anticipated but ultimately disappointing provincial decider. A 1–19 to 1–12 victory gave Walsh a seventh Leinster medal. The drive for a fifth successive All-Ireland crown reached a head on 5 September 2010, when Kilkenny faced Tipperary in the All-Ireland decider. "The Cats" lost talisman Henry Shefflin due to injury, while Tipperary's Lar Corbett ran riot and scored a hat-trick of goals as Walsh's side fell to a 4–17 to 1–18 defeat. In spite of this defeat, Walsh later won an eight successive All-Star award.

Kilkenny's stranglehold in Leinster continued in 2011. A 4–17 to 1–15 defeat of Dublin gave "the Cats" a record-equalling seventh successive championship. It was Walsh's eighth winners' medal overall. Kilkenny subsequently faced Tipperary in a record-breaking seventh successive All-Ireland decider on 4 September 2011. Goals by Michael Fennelly and Richie Hogan in either half gave Kilkenny, who many viewed as the underdogs going into the game, a 2–17 to 1–16 victory. Walsh, who collected a sixth All-Ireland medal, was lucky not to have received a red card as a wild strike of his hurley caught referee Brian Gavin on the bridge of the nose, resulting in a four-minute stoppage. He later collected a ninth successive All-Star award.

2012 began well for Walsh when he collected a fifth National League medal following a 3–21 to 0–16 demolition of old rivals Cork. Kilkenny were later shocked by Galway in the Leinster decider, losing by 2–21 to 2–11, however, both sides subsequently met in the All-Ireland decider on 9 September 2012. Kilkenny had led going into the final stretch, however, Joe Canning struck a stoppage time equaliser to level the game at 2–13 to 0–19 and send the final to a replay for the first time since 1959. The replay took place three weeks later on 30 September 2012. Galway stunned the reigning champions with two first-half goals, however, Kilkenny's championship debutant Walter Walsh gave a man of the match performance, claiming a 1–3 haul. The 3–22 to 3–11 Kilkenny victory gave Walsh a seventh All-Ireland medal.

==== Decline ====
Kilkenny's dominance showed no sign of abating in 2013, with Walsh winning a sixth National League medal following a 2–17 to 0–20 defeat of Tipperary in the decider.

During the 2014 league campaign a loss of form saw Walsh being dropped from Kilkenny's starting fifteen in favour of his brother Pádraig. He was an unused substitute as "the Cats" claimed a third successive league crown following a 2–25 to 1–27 defeat of Tipperary. He failed to convince manager Brian Cody and remained on the bench for Kilkenny's championship opener against Offaly. Walsh made a number of cameo appearances during the provincial campaign, but played no part in Kilkenny's Leinster final triumph. He also remained on the bench during the All-Ireland series, however, he collected a ninth All-Ireland medal, his second as a non-playing substitute, following a 2–17 to 2–14 defeat of Tipperary in the decider.

On 20 November 2014 Walsh announced his retirement from inter-county hurling. In a released statement he said "I wish to announce my retirement from intercounty hurling. For the last 13 years I have had the time of my life, lived my dream and have memories that will stay with me forever."

=== Inter-provincial ===
In 2006 Walsh was at right wing-back on the Leinster team that faced Connacht in the inter-provincial final. A disappointing contest resulted in a 1–23 to 0–17 victory for Leinster, and a first Railway Cup medal for Walsh.

After surrendering their title the following year, Leinster were back in the decider once again in 2008 with Walsh as captain. Richie Power top-scored with nine points as Leinster secured a 1–15 to 1–12 victory. It was Walsh's second Railway Cup medal, while he also had the honour of collecting the cup.

Leinster made it two-in-a-row in 2009, with Walsh collecting his third winner's medal as Leinster defeated Connacht by 3–18 to 1–17.

After a two-year hiatus and a period of uncertainty surrounding the competition, the Railway Cup returned in 2012 with Leinster facing Connacht in the decider. The game was effectively over at half time, with Leinster powering to an eventual 2–19 to 1–15 victory.

In 2014 Walsh lined out in his last Railway Cup decider. Just 150 spectators turned up to Croke Park as Leinster walloped Connacht for the third time in four finals by 1–23 to 0–16.

=== International ===
Walsh was picked for duty with the national team in 2008, as Ireland faced Scotland in the composite rules shinty-hurling series of games. The Scots narrowly won the game by 1–10 to 1–9.

In 2009 Walsh was appointed captain of the team as Ireland travelled to Bught Park for the one-leg clash. Shane Dooley was the goal-scoring hero, as Ireland secured a narrow 2–8 to 1–8 victory.

Walsh reprised his role as captain in 2010, as the competition was expanded to a two-leg series. Ireland won the series with an aggregate score of 7–21 to 5–23, with Walsh collecting the cup for the second year in succession.

After a one-year absence, Walsh returned to the squad in 2012. He later collected a third winners' medal as Ireland defeated Scotland with an aggregate score of 11–21 to 6–12.

== Recognition ==
During the GAA 125 celebrations in 2009, Walsh was chosen at left wing-forward on a special Leinster team of the quarter century. Later that year he was chosen in the top ten list of all-time great hurlers in a special Irish Independent poll.

After announcing his retirement, Walsh received acclaim from former colleagues and opponents. For example, Tipperary's All-Ireland-winning captain, Eoin Kelly, said of him: "For me he was the best, that’s how I’d rate Tommy. He had everything — aggression, skill, courage, you name it. He had the will to influence the game, to make the ball go where he wanted it to go. He ticked all the boxes for me — the best, simple as that. I couldn’t give him any higher a compliment than that."

Lar Corbett of Tipperary said: "He's one of the all-time greats, he's probably one of the best players that has ever played the game,"

Waterford's four-time Munster medallist John Mullane described Walsh as "...a freakish kind of hurler. We won't see the likes of Tommy...again. It's true what they say isn't it? Sometimes, the best things really do come in small packages."

Fellow Kilkenny defender and seven-time All-Ireland medallist Michael Kavanagh said of Walsh: "Pound for pound, I’d say I haven’t seen any better as a defender. Top-class, he had it all: the heart of a lion; very good in the air; huge skills; very competitive, no matter whether it was in training or anything else."

Enda McEvoy, writing in the Irish Examiner, summed up Walsh's credentials as one of the all-time greats of hurling: "The Team of the 20th Century had a Tullaroan player at wing-back {Paddy Phelan}. The Team of the 21st Century already has another."

== Personal life ==
Born in Tullaroan, County Kilkenny, Walsh was the eldest child in a family of five. His three brothers, Martin, Padraig and Shane, as well as his sister Grace have all enjoyed success at hurling and camogie. His cousin, Tommy, has played for Kilkenny since 2018.

Walsh was educated at the local national school before later completing his Leaving Certificate at St Kieran's College. He subsequently completed a Bachelor of Arts at University College Cork, before later becoming a bank official with Bank of Ireland.

On 30 December 2011 Walsh married his long-term girlfriend Marlis Coonan. A year later the couple celebrated the birth of their first child.

== Miscellaneous ==
- After winning a 9th All-Ireland winners' medal with Kilkenny in September 2014 he announced his retirement in November of that year. If he had remained on the panel for the 2015 championship he might have equalled Henry Shefflin's record of winning 10 All-Ireland medals.

== Honours ==
=== Team ===
Tullaroan

- Kilkenny Intermediate Hurling Championship (1): 2019
- Leinster Intermediate Club Hurling Championship (1): 2019
- All-Ireland Intermediate Club Hurling Championship (1): 2020
- Kilkenny Senior Hurling League (2): 2000, 2001
- Kilkenny Under-21 Hurling Championship (1): 2001
- Kilkenny Minor Hurling Championship (1): 1999

St Kieran's College

- Leinster Colleges Senior Hurling Championship (1): 2000
- All-Ireland Senior Colleges Hurling Championship (1): 2000

Kilkenny

- All-Ireland Senior Hurling Championship (9): 2002 (sub), 2003, 2006, 2007, 2008, 2009, 2011, 2012, 2014 (sub)
- Leinster Senior Hurling Championship (10): 2002 (sub), 2003, 2005, 2006, 2007, 2008, 2009, 2010, 2011, 2014 (sub)
- National Hurling League (7): 2003, 2005, 2006, 2009, 2012, 2013, 2014 (sub)
- Walsh Cup (6): 2005, 2006, 2007, 2009, 2012, 2014
- All-Ireland Under-21 Hurling Championship (2): 2003, 2004
- Leinster Under-21 Hurling Championship (2): 2003, 2004
- Leinster Minor Hurling Championship (1): 2001

Leinster

- Railway Cup (6): 2003 (sub), 2006, 2008 (c), 2009, 2012, 2014

Ireland

- Composite Rules (3): 2009 (c), 2010 (c), 2012

=== Individual ===
Awards

- Leinster Hurling Team of the Last 25 Years (1984–2009): Left wing-forward
- The 125 greatest stars of the GAA: No. 10
- Texaco Hurler of the Year (1): 2009
- All Stars Hurler of the Year (1): 2009
- GPA Hurler of the Year (1): 2009
- All-Stars (9): 2003, 2004, 2005, 2006, 2007, 2008, 2009, 2010, 2011

Awards
Preceded by Eoin Larkin (Kilkenny)	Vodafone All Stars Hurler of the Year; 2009	Succeeded by Lar Corbett (Tipperary)
Preceded by Eoin Larkin (Kilkenny)	Texaco Hurler of the Year; 2009	Succeeded by Lar Corbett (Tipperary)
Preceded by Eoin Larkin (Kilkenny)	Gaelic Players' Association; Hurler of the Year; 2009	Succeeded by Lar Corbett (Tipperary)
Sporting positions
Preceded by Canice Hickey	Kilkenny minor hurling team captain 2000	Succeeded by Emmet Kavanagh
Preceded by Shane Cavanagh	Ireland Composite Rules; Shinty-Hurling Captain; 2009–2010	Succeeded by Michael Rice
Achievements
Preceded by John Mullane (Munster)	Railway Cup Hurling Final winning captain 2008	Succeeded by J. J. Delaney (Leinster)
Preceded by Kenny Ross (Scotland)	Composite Rules Shinty-Hurling Final winning captain 2009–2010	Succeeded by Michael Rice (Ireland)
