= Lisdowney =

Townland in County Kilkenny, Ireland

Lisdowney Lios Dúnaígh
- Townland
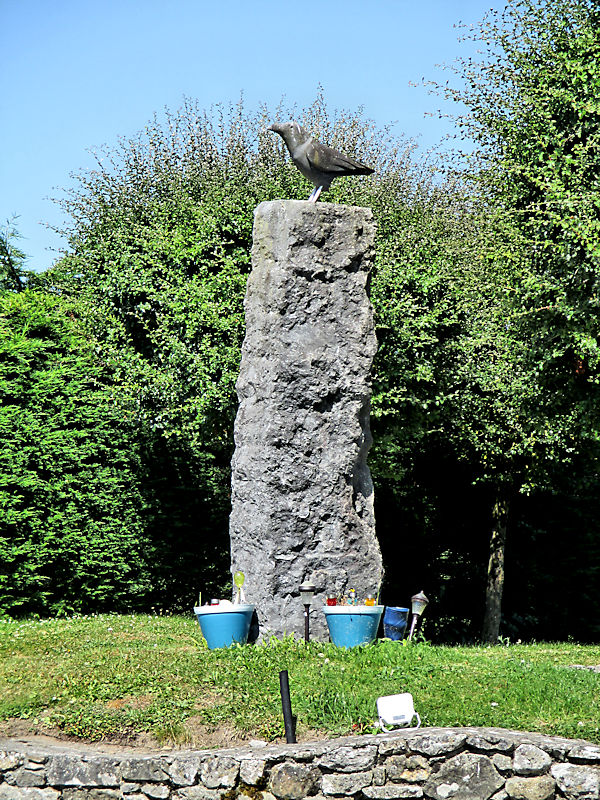
- Sculpture in Lisdowney

- Location in Ireland
- Coordinates: 52.7887°N 7.3917°W
- Country: Ireland
- Province: Leinster
- County: County Kilkenny

Area
  - Total: 7 km^{2} (2.7 sq mi)

Population (2011)
  - Total: 93
  - Density: 13/km^{2} (34/sq mi)
- Time zone: UTC+0 (WET)
  - Summer (DST): UTC-1 (IST)
- Eircode routing key: R95
- Area code: +353
- Irish grid reference: S410709

Lisdowney (Irish: Lios Dúnaígh) is a townland in County Kilkenny, Ireland. It lies on the River Nore near Ballyragget and is home to Lisdowney GAA club. The townland is in the civil parish of Aharney, within the historical barony of Galmoy, and in the electoral division of Lisdowney. As of the 2011 census, Lisdowney townland had a population of 93 people.

== History ==
Evidence of ancient settlement in the townland include recorded ringfort, fulacht fiadh and fortified house sites. Lisdowney's Roman Catholic church is dedicated to Saint Brigid and was built in 1840.

== Amenities and sport ==
The national (primary) school which serves the area, Lisdowney National School, had an enrollment of 98 pupils in 2022.

The local Gaelic Athletic Association club is Lisdowney GAA. Hurling and camogie teams, representing the club, won the All-Ireland Senior Club Camogie Championship in 1994, and the Kilkenny Intermediate Hurling Championship in 2020 and in 2024. Ted Carroll, Angela Downey and Ann Downey are former Lisdowney club members.

== Geography ==
Lisdowney townland, which has an area of approximately 7 square kilometres (2.7 sq mi), had a population of 93 people as of the 2011 census. It is in north County Kilkenny near the border with County Laois.

A wind farm, comprising four turbines generating 9.2 Megawatts, is located in the area.
