= Liam Keoghan =

Irish hurler (born 1967)

Personal information
- Native name: Liam Mac Eochagáin (Irish)
- Born: 29 September 1967 (age 59) Tullaroan, County Kilkenny, Ireland
- Occupation: Farmer
- Height: 5 ft 10 in (178 cm)

Sport
- Sport: Hurling
- Position: Right wing-back
Club
- Years: Club
- Tullaroan
Club titles
- Kilkenny titles: 1
Inter-county
- Years: County
- 1992-1998: Kilkenny
Inter-county titles
- Leinster titles: 2
- All-Irelands: 1
- NHL: 1
- All Stars: 1

Liam Michael Keoghan (born 29 September 1967) is an Irish former hurler. At club level he played with Tullaroan and was also a member of the Kilkenny senior hurling team. He usually lined out as a wing-back.

== Career ==
Keoghan first came to prominence at juvenile and underage levels with the Tullaroan club before eventually joining the club's top adult team. He enjoyed his first success in 1988 when Tullaroan won the County Intermediate Championship before claiming the County Senior Championship title in 1994. Keoghan first appeared on the inter-county scene with the Kilkenny minor team in 1985 before winning a Leinster Championship title with the under-21 side in 1988. He was drafted onto the Kilkenny senior hurling team prior to the start of the 1992-93 league and was at wing-back when Kilkenny beat Galway in the 1993 All-Ireland final. Keoghan's other honours include a National League title in 1995, two Leinster Championship medals and an All-Star Award. His last major game was the 1998 All-Ireland final defeat by Offaly. His granduncle, Jack Keoghan, won five All-Ireland medals during a golden age for Kilkenny between 1907 and 1913, while his son, Martin Keoghan, has also lined out for Kilkenny.

== Honours ==
=== Team ===
Tullaroan

- Kilkenny Senior Hurling Championship: 1994
- Kilkenny Intermediate Hurling Championship: 1988

Kilkenny

- All-Ireland Senior Hurling Championship: 1993
- Leinster Senior Hurling Championship: 1993, 1998
- National Hurling League: 1994-95
- Leinster Under-21 Hurling Championship: 1988

=== Individual ===
Awards

- Tullaroan Hurling Team of the Century: Right wing-back
- All-Star Award: 1997
