= Tullaroan Church =

- Séipéal Thulach Ruáin
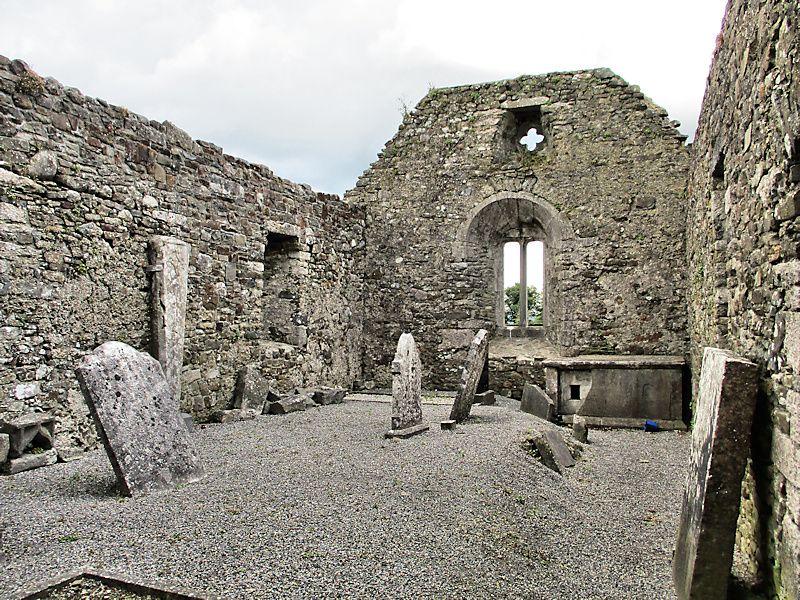
- Ruined interior of Tullaroan Church

- Location within Ireland
- 52.658076°N 7.43363°W
- Location: Tullaroan, County Kilkenny
- Country: Ireland
- Denomination: Church of Ireland
- Previous denomination: Pre-Reformation Catholic

History
- Dedication: Assumption of Mary

Architecture
- Heritage designation

National monument of Ireland
- Official name: Tullaroan Church
- Reference no.: 670
- Style: Gothic
- Years built: 12th–13th centuries

Administration
- Diocese: Ossory

Tullaroan Church is a medieval church and National Monument in County Kilkenny, Ireland.

== Location ==
Tullaroan Church is located immediately south of Tullaroan, on the east bank of a tributary of the Munster River.

== Church ==
Tullaroan Parish Church consisted of nave and chancel.

Other features are a sedilia, Gothic door, and choir-arch.

Grace's Chapel was founded in 1543 by Sir John (Le) Grace (died 1568) and is attached to the south side of the parish church.
