= Kevin Kelly (hurler) =

Irish hurler (born 1993)

Personal information
- Native name: Caoimhín Ó Ceallaigh (Irish)
- Born: 1 October 1993 (age 33) Ballyragget, County Kilkenny, Ireland
- Occupation: AIB bank official
- Height: 6 ft 1 in (185 cm)

Sport
- Sport: Hurling
- Position: Full-forward
Club
- Years: Club
- St Patrick's
Club titles
- Kilkenny titles: 0
Inter-county*
Years	County	Apps (scores)
2015-present	Kilkenny	16 (5-27)
Inter-county titles
- Leinster titles: 2
- All-Irelands: 1
- NHL: 1
- All Stars: 0
- *Inter County team apps and scores correct as of 22:18, 23 March 2015.

Kevin Kelly (born 1 October 1993) is an Irish hurler who plays as a full-forward for the Kilkenny senior team.

Born in Ballyragget, County Kilkenny, Kelly first played competitive hurling during his schooling at Heywood Community School. He arrived on the inter-county scene at the age of sixteen when he first linked up with the Kilkenny minor team, before later joining the under-21 and intermediate sides. He joined the senior panel during the 2015 league.

At club level, Kelly is a one-time All-Ireland medallist in the junior grade with St Patrick's Ballyragget. In addition to this, he has also won one Leinster medal and one championship medal in the same grade.

== Playing career ==
=== Minor and under-21 ===
Kelly first played for Kilkenny in 2010 when he joined the minor side. He won his sole Leinster medal on the field of play that year following a 1–20 to 0-10 trouncing of Dublin. The subsequent All-Ireland decider pitted Kilkenny against Clare. "The Cats" were made to work hard before securing a narrow 2–10 to 0–14 victory, giving Kelly an All-Ireland Minor Hurling Championship medal. He was also named man of the match.

Two years later Kelly was a key member of the Kilkenny under-21 team. He won a Leinster medal that year following a 4–24 to 1-13 trouncing of Laois. Kilkenny later faced Clare in the All-Ireland decider. A powerful second-half display, in which they outscored Kilkenny 1–10 to 0–4, saw Clare take their second-ever All-Ireland under-21 crown.

== Career statistics ==
As of match played 3 February 2019.

Team	Year	National League			Leinster		All-Ireland		Total	
Team	Year	Division	Apps	Score	Apps	Score	Apps	Score	Apps	Score
Kilkenny	2015	Division 1A	3	1-09	1	0-01	0	0-00	4	1-10
Kilkenny	2016	Division 1A	4	2-01	1	0-00	2	1-02	7	3-03
Kilkenny	2017	Division 1A	1	0-00	1	0-00	2	0-03	4	0-03
Kilkenny	2018	Division 1A	0	0-00	0	0-00	0	0-00	0	0-00
Kilkenny	2019	Division 1A	2	1-19	0	0-00	0	0-00	2	1-19
Total			10	4-19	3	0-01	4	1-05	17	5-35

== Honours ==
=== Team ===
St Patrick's

- Kilkenny Intermediate Hurling Championship (1): 2017
- All-Ireland Junior Club Hurling Championship (1): 2012
- Leinster Junior Club Hurling Championship (1): 2012
- Kilkenny Junior Hurling Championship (1): 2011

Kilkenny

- Leinster Intermediate Hurling Championship (1): 2012
- Leinster Under-21 Hurling Championship (1): 2012
- All-Ireland Minor Hurling Championship (1): 2010
- Leinster Minor Hurling Championship (1): 2010

=== Individual ===
Honours

- All-Ireland Minor Hurling Final Man of the Match (1): 2010
