= 2019 Kilkenny Intermediate Hurling Championship =

- Dates: 21 September 2019 – 27 October 2019
- Teams: 12
- Sponsor: Michael Lyng Motors Hyundai
- Champions: Tullaroan (2nd title); Shane Walsh (captain); Jimmy Coogan (manager)
- Runners-up: Thomastown; James Burke (captain); Maurice Aylward (manager)
- Relegated: Tullogher-Rosbercon

Tournament statistics
- Matches played: 14
- Goals scored: 42 (3 per match)
- Points scored: 418 (29.86 per match)
- Top scorer(s): Paul Holden (2-40)

The 2019 Kilkenny Intermediate Hurling Championship was the 55th staging of the Kilkenny Intermediate Hurling Championship since its establishment by the Kilkenny County Board in 1929. The championship began on 21 September 2019 and ended on 27 October 2019.

On 27 October 2019, Tullaroan won the championship after a 3–18 to 0–21 defeat of Thomastown in the final at UPMC Nowlan Park. It was their second championship title overall and their first title since 1988.

Paul Holden from the Young Irelands club was the championship's top scorer with 2-40.

== Team changes ==
=== To Championship ===
Promoted from the Kilkenny Junior Hurling Championship

- Dunnamaggin

Relegated from the Kilkenny Senior Hurling Championship

- Carrickshock

=== From Championship ===
Promoted to the Kilkenny Senior Hurling Championship

- Graigue-Ballycallan

Relegated to the Kilkenny Junior Hurling Championship

- Mooncoin

== Results ==
=== First round ===
21 September 2019 First round	Tullogher-Rosbercon	1-12 - 1-16	Dunnamaggin	Páirc na Seamróg, Ballyhale
	C O'Donoghue 0-8, W Walsh 1-1, S Ryan 0-1, C Hennessy 0-1, A O'Connor 0-1.		A Fitzpatrick 1-2, E Kearney 0-3, W Phelan 0-3, R Coffey 0-3, C Hoban 0-2, M Cody 0-1, J Fitzpatrick 0-1, I Walsh 0-1.	Referee: G Quilty (Slieverue)

21 September 2019 First round	Fenians	3-15 - 4-09	John Locke's	Tom Ryall Park, Kilmanagh
	M Webster 0-9, C Tobin 1-1, K Power 1-1, S Tobin 1-0, M Carroll 0-2, K Grehan 0-1, N Carroll 0-1.		R Bergin 1-8, C Murphy 2-0, R Kerwick 1-0, B Kirwan 0-1.

22 September 2019 First round	Glenmore	0-17 - 1-11	Lisdowney	Bennettsbridge
	A Murphy 0-7, E Murphy 0-4, G Aylward 0-3, E Vereker 0-1, L Hennessy 0-1, D Hartley 0-1.		N Brennan 0-11, V Fitzpatrick 1-0.	Referee: M Flynn (Mooncoin)

22 September 2019 First round	Carrickshock	2-10 - 3-19	Young Irelands	Thomastown
	J Power 1-4, M Rice 1-0, J O'Dwyer 0-3, K Farrell 0-2, B O'Donovan 0-1.		P Holden 1-8, S Carey 1-2, P Kinsella 1-1, JP Treacy 0-3, T Drea 0-3, S Kehoe 0-1, JJ Lennon 0-1.	Referee: R Dowling (Kilmacow)

=== Relegation playoff ===
5 October 2019 Relegation playoff	Tullogher-Rosbercon	1-09 - 1-10	John Locke's	Thomastown
	C Hennessy 1-4, R Dollard 0-3, W Walsh 0-1, D O'Connor 0-1.		R Bergin 0-6, P Purcell 1-0, B Kirwan 0-1, C Murphy 0-1, P Kennedy 0-1, B Doheny 0-1.	Referee: P Cahill (Dunnamaggin)

=== Quarter-finals ===
28 September 2019 Quarter-final	St. Lachtain's	2-17 - 2-17	Dunnamaggin	Tom Ryall Park, Kilmanagh
	L Hickey 0-10, N McGree 1-2, S Donnelly 1-0, S Rafter 0-2, D Maher 0-2, P Killeen 0-1.		C Hoban 1-3, E Kearney 0-5, M Cody 1-1, R Coffey 0-3, A Fitzpatrick 0-2, D Fitzpatrick 0-2, I Walsh 0-1.	Referee: C Everard (Graigue-Ballycallan)

28 September 2019 Quarter-final	Tullaroan	3-17 - 1-05	Fenians	St. Patrick's Park, Ballyragget
	Peter Walsh 2-1, S Walsh 0-7, Tommy Walsh M 1-1, M Keoghan 0-3, M Walsh 0-1, J Walton 0-1, T Dunne 0-1, S Dowling 0-1, T Walsh V 0-1.		M Webster 0-5, C Tobin 1-0.	Referee: J Kennedy (Ballyhale Shamrocks)

29 September 2019 Quarter-final	St. Martin's	1-15 - 0-18	Young Irelands	Clara
	S Kinsella 0-6, J Mulhall 0-5, B Cody 1-0, C Maher 0-2, T Breen 0-1, J Maher 0-1.		P Holden 0-10, S Kehoe 0-3, S Carey 0-2, P Delahunty 0-1, JP Treacy 0-1, P O'Neill 0-1.

29 September 2019 Quarter-final	Thomastown	3-24 - 1-15	Glenmore	Inistioge
	R Donnelly 0-13, J Donnelly 1-3, JJ Farrell 1-2, T O'Hanrahan 1-1, S Donnelly 0-2, D Barron 0-1, A Burke 0-1, D Caulfield 0-1.		A Murphy 0-11, M Aylward 1-0, G Aylward 0-2, E Murphy 0-1, E Phelan 0-1.	Referee: P Cahill (Dunnamaggin)

5 October 2019 Quarter-final replay	St. Martin's	0-12 - 1-16	Young Irelands	Páirc Shéamuis Stiophán, Kilkenny
	S Kinsella 0-4, C McGrath 0-4, B Byrne 0-1, B Coady 0-1, C Maher 0-1, E McGrath 0-1.		P Holden 0-10, S Kehoe 0-4, D Carey 1-0, T Drea 0-1, P Kinsella 0-1.

6 October 2019 Quarter-final replay	St. Lachtain's	2-19 - 0-13	Dunnamaggin	Tom Ryall Park, Kilmanagh
	S Donnelly 1-3, D Maher 1-1, L Hickey 0-4, B Kennedy 0-4, J Maher 0-2, N McGree 0-2, P White 0-1, C O'Leary 0-1, A Rafter 0-1.		W Phelan 0-5, C Hoban 0-4, E Kearney 0-3, A Moore 0-1.	Referee: R Byrne (Glenmore)

=== Semi-finals ===
12 October 2019 Semi-final	Tullaroan	2-17 - 2-15	Young Irelands	UPMC Nowlan Park, Kilkenny
	S Walsh (0-7); Peter Walsh (2-1); Tommy Walsh, M (0-4); J Walsh (0-2); Tommy Walsh (V), Padraig Walsh, A Tallis (0-1 each).	Report	P Holden (1-12); S Kehoe (1-1); C Nolan, P Kinsella (0-1 each).

12 October 2019 Semi-final	Thomastown	1-21 - 1-10	St. Lachtain's	UPMC Nowlan Park, Kilkenny
	R Donnelly (0-14); J Farrell (1-1); S Donnelly (0-3); J Donnelly, E Donnelly, D Caulfield (0-1 each).	Report	L Hickey (0-5); N McGree (1-1); J Maher (0-2); S Rafter, P Killeen (0-1 each).

=== Final ===
27 October 2019 Final	Tullaroan	3-18 - 0-21	Thomastown	UPMC Nowlan Park, Kilkenny
	S Walsh (0-8); Peter Walsh (2-2); Tommy Walsh M (1-2); J Walton (0-4); S Maher, M Keoghan (0-1 each).		R Donnelly (0-12); S Donnelly (0-4); J Donnelly (0-3); E Donnelly, D Caulfield (0-1 each).	Referee: P Cahill (Dunnamaggin)

== Championship statistics ==
=== Top scorers ===
Top scorers overall

Rank	Player	Club	Tally	Total	Matches	Average
1	Paul Holden	Young Irelands	2-40	46	4	11.50
2	Robbie Donnelly	Thomastown	0-39	39	3	13.00
3	Peter Walsh	Tullaroan	6-04	22	3	7.33
3	Shane Walsh	Tullaroan	0-22	22	3	7.33
4	Liam Hickey	St. Lachtain's	0-19	19	3	6.33
5	Alan Murphy	Glenmore	0-18	18	2	9.00
6	Ryan Bergin	John Locke's	1-14	17	2	8.50
7	Mark Webster	Fenians	0-14	14	2	7.00
8	Tommy Walsh	Tullaroan	2-07	13	3	4.33
9	Conor Hoban	Dunnamaggin	1-09	12	3	4.00

Top scorers in a single game

Rank	Player	Club	Tally	Total	Opposition
1	Paul Holden	Young Irelands	1-12	15	Tullaroan
2	Robbie Donnelly	Thomastown	0-14	14	St. Lachtain's
3	Robbie Donnelly	Thomastown	0-13	13	Glenmore
4	Robbie Donnelly	Thomastown	0-12	12	Tullaroan
5	Ryan Bergin	John Locke's	1-08	11	Fenians
5	Paul Holden	Young Irelands	1-08	11	Carrickshock
5	Niall Brennan	Lisdowney	0-11	11	Glenmore
5	Alan Murphy	Glenmore	0-11	11	Thomastown
6	Liam Hickey	St. Lachtain's	0-10	10	Dunnamaggin
6	Paul Holden	Young Irelands	0-10	10	St. Martin's
6	Paul Holden	Young Irelands	0-10	10	St. Martin's
