= 2024 Kilkenny Intermediate Hurling Championship =

Annual hurling competition season

- Dates: 14 September - 20 October 2024
- Teams: 12
- Sponsor: Michael Lyng Motors Hyundai
- Champions: Lidowney (2nd title); Mick Kenny (captain); Trevor Fletcher (manager)
- Runners-up: Young Irelands; Mikey Carey (captain); Barry Power (manager)
- Relegated: Conahy Shamrocks

Tournament statistics
- Matches played: 12
- Goals scored: 17 (1.42 per match)
- Points scored: 414 (34.5 per match)
- Top scorer(s): Seán Carey (1-26)

The 2024 Kilkenny Intermediate Hurling Championship was the 60th staging of the Kilkenny Intermediate Hurling Championship since its establishment by the Kilkenny County Board in 1929. The championship ran from 14 September to 20 October 2024.

The final was played on 20 October 2024 at UPMC Nowlan Park in Kilkenny, between Lisdowney and Young Irelands, in what was their first ever meeting in the final. Lisdowney won the match by 2-12 to 0-15 to claim their second championship title overall and a first title in four years.

Seán Carey was the championship's top scorer with 1-26.

== Team changes ==
=== To Championship ===
Promoted from the Kilkenny Premier Junior Hurling Championship

- Tullogher–Rosbercon

Relegated from the Kilkenny Senior Hurling Championship

- Danesfort

=== From Championship ===
Promoted to the Kilkenny Senior Hurling Championship

- Thomastown

Relegated to the Kilkenny Premier Junior Hurling Championship

- O'Loughlin Gaels

== Results ==
=== First round ===
14 September 2024 First round	Rower-Inistioge	1-19 - 0-15	Fenians	Palmerstown Grounds
	M Galavan (0-8, 0-6 frees, 0-1 65); E Lyng, K Murphy (0-4 each); Jim Ryan (1-0); S Ryan, Jamie Ryan, E Prendergast (0-1 each).	Report	C Tobin (0-8 frees); W Brennan (0-4); K Grehan (1-0); D McCormack (0-3); R Downey (0-1).

14 September 2024 First round	Dunnamaggin	0-17 - 1-17	Mooncoin	Piltown GAA Complex
	D Walsh (0-10, 0-7 frees); A Hickey (0-3); V Costello, P Keneally, R Cody and D Fitzpatrick (0-1, each).	Report	L Hogan (0-8, 0-7 frees; 0-1 ’65); C Quilty (1-1); K Hogan and A Croke (0-3, each); P Hennebry and S Wall (0-1, each).

15 September 2024 First round	Conahy Shamrocks	0-20 - 0-21	St Martin's	St Patrick's Park
	J Bergin (0-11, 0-9 frees); T Phelan (0-4, 0-1 line ball); E Cahill (0-2); T Rice, K Mooney, D Hennessy (0-1 each).	Report	J O’Neill (0-8); S Kinsella (0-5, 0-4 frees); C McGrath (0-3, frees); S Hunt and M Keane (0-2 each); J Mulhall (0-1).-

15 September 2024 First round	Blacks and Whites	0-17 - 1-13	Carrickshock	Inistioge Grounds
		Report

=== Relegation playoff ===
28 September 024 Playoff	Carrickshock	2-16 - 0-19	Conahy Shamrocks	Páirc Séamus Stiopháin
	E O'Neill 2-8.	Report	J Bergin 0-5.

=== Quarter-finals ===
22 September 2024 Quarter-final	Lisdowney	0-20 - 1-14	St Martin's	St Patrick's Park
	B Kavanagh (0-7, 0-3 frees); L Dunphy (0-5); K Sweeney, R McEvoy, L Holohan (0-2 each); E McEvoy, D Jordan (0-1 each)	Report	D Comerford (1-1); C McGrath, S Kinsella (0-2, two frees each); J Mulhall, M Keane, B Coady (0-2 each); J O’Neill, S Hunt, A Farrell (0-1 each).

22 September 2024 Quarter-final	Danesfort	1-22 - 1-22; Penalties: 3-0	Rower-Inistioge	Thomastown Grounds
	B Whitty (0-8, all frees); P Hogan (1-1, frees); D O’Neill (0-3); C Phelan, C O’Neill, D Coverdale (0-2 each); A Ireland Wall, J Cullen, S Hayes, A Byrne (0-1 each)	Report	M Galavan (1-9, 0-8 frees); E Lyng, K Murphy (0-3 each); Pat Lyng, Paddy Lyng (0-2 each); E O’Brien, S Lyster, J Ryan (0-1 each).

22 September 2024 Quarter-final	Tullogher-Rosbercon	0-16 - 1-22	Mooncoin	Mullinavat Grounds
	C O’Donoghue (0-7, frees); C Hennessy, D Glennon (0-3 each); L Murphy, M Murphy, W Walsh (0-1 each).	Report	L Hogan (0-8, 0-6 frees); O Henebery (1-3); P Henebery (0-4, frees); S Wall, A Croke, C Quilty, K Hogan, S Crowley, M Gannon, K Crowley (0-1 each).

22 September 2024 Quarter-final	Young Irelands	2-19 - 0-16	Blacks and Whites	Clara Grounds
	S Carey (1-11, 0-7 frees); K Carey (1-2); T Drea (0-3); S Farrell (0-2); M Carey (0-1).	Report	N Kennedy (0-7, frees); R Murphy (0-2 frees); M Kelly, Jason Byrne (0-2 each); J Lennon, Jamie Byrne (0-1 each); S Byrne (0-1 free).

=== Semi-finals ===
5 October 2024 Semi-final	Danesfort	0-18 - 0-20	Young Irelands	UPMC Nowlan Park
	R Hogan (0-7, 0-6 frees); A Ireland Wall, C Kearney (0-3 each); P Hogan (0-2, 0-2 frees); P Hickey (0-2); J Cullen (0-1)	Report	S Carey (0-9, 0-5 frees); T Drea (0-5); S Farrell (0-2); K Carey, P Naddy, J Byrne, J Conlon (0-1 each)

5 October 2024 Semi-final	Lisdowney	2-16 - 1-18	Mooncoin	UPMC Nowlan Park
	B Kavanagh (1-7, 0-2 ‘65s and 0-1 free); E McEvoy (1-1); C Jordan, L Dunphy (0-2 each); D Jordan, N Brennan, P O’Carroll, R McEvoy (0-1 each)	Report	L Hogan (0-11, 0-8 frees and 0-1 ‘65); O Henebery (1-1); A Croke, S Crowley (0-2 each); C Quilty, C Kinsella (0-1 each)

=== Final ===
20 October 2024 Final	Young Irelands	0-15 - 2-12	Lisdowney	UPMC Nowlan Park
	S Carey (0-6, 0-6 frees); K Carey, P Langton (0-2 each); M Carey, P Farrell, T Drea, S Farrell, P Naddy (0-1)	Report	B Kavanagh (0-5, 0-5 frees); L Dunphy (1-1); C Jordan (1-0); D Jordan (0-2); A Tallis (0-1, 0-1 free); M Kenny, P O'Carroll, D O'Carroll (0-1 each)	Referee: R Holland (Tullaroan)

== Championship statistics ==
=== Top scorers ===
Overall

Rank	Player	County	Tally	Total	Matches	Average
1	Seán Carey	Young Irelands	1-26	29	3	9.66
2	Liam Hogan	Moonoin	0-27	27	3	9.00
3	Brian Kavanagh	Lisdowney	1-19	22	3	7.33
