= 2019–20 All-Ireland Intermediate Club Hurling Championship =

Championship Details
- Dates: 12 October 2019 - 18 January 2020
- Teams: 27

All Ireland Champions
- Winners: Tullaroan (1st win)
- Captain: Shane Walsh
- Manager: Jimmy Coogan

All Ireland Runners-up
- Runners-up: Fr. O'Neill's
- Captain: Dan Harrington
- Manager: James O'Connor

Provincial Champions
- Munster: Fr. O'Neill's
- Leinster: Tullaroan
- Ulster: Naomh Éanna
- Connacht: Tooreen

Championship Statistics
- Matches Played: 26
- Total Goals: 66 (2.53 per game)
- Total Points: 835 (32.11 per game)
- Top Scorer: Declan Dalton (5-42)

The 2019–20 All-Ireland Intermediate Club Hurling Championship was the 16th staging of the All-Ireland Intermediate Club Hurling Championship, the Gaelic Athletic Association's intermediate inter-county club hurling tournament. The championship began on 12 October 2019 and ended on 18 January 2020.

On 18 January 2020, Tullaroan won the championship after a 3-19 to 5-12 defeat of Fr. O'Neill's in the All-Ireland final at Croke Park. This was their first ever championship title.

Declan Dalton from the Fr. O'Neill's club was the championship's top scorer with 5-42.

== Provincial championships ==
=== Connacht Intermediate Club Hurling Championship ===
Quarter-final

27 October 2019 Quarter-final	Four Roads	0-19 - 0-29	Tooreen	Athleague Sportsfield, Athleague
	C Dolan (0-10, 9f), P Kelly (0-4, 1f); B Mulry (0-2), N Fallon (0-1), S Curley (0-1), J Cunniffe (0-1).	Report	S Kenny (0-8, 7f, 1 sideline), F Boland (0-7), S Boland (0-5, 3f), E Delaney (0-3), K Feeney (0-2), S Regan (0-2); C Freeman (0-1), C Henry (0-1).	Referee: S Hynes (Galway)

Semi-final

3 November 2019 Semi-final	Tooreen	0-30 - 1-23 (aet)	Robert Emmets	Athleague Sportsfield, Athleague
	S Boland (0-14, 12f), K Feeney (0-7, 2f), E Delaney (0-2), F Boland (0-2), S Regan (0-2); D Huane (0-1); S Kenny (0-1, 1f), B Morley (0-1).	Report	B McCarry (0-12, 6f, 1 '65), C Lordan (1-2), J McCarthy (0-3), B Conroy (0-2, 1f, 1 '65), D McMullan (0-1), K Burke (0-1); C Kerr (0-1), D Regan (0-1).	Referee: L Gordon

Final

17 November 2019 Final	Tooreen	0-21 - 2-10	Kinvara	Athleague Sportsfield, Athleague
	S Boland 0-11, F Boland 0-4, K Feeney 0-3, E Delaney 0-1, B Morley 0-1, S Regan 0-1.		C Whelan 1-5, C Curtin 1-1, S Kavanagh 0-1, N Bermingham 0-1, A Moylan 0-1, C Callanan 0-1.	Referee: P O'Dwyer

=== Leinster Intermediate Club Hurling Championship ===
First round

26 October 2019 First round	Bagenalstown Gaels	1-15 - 3-12	Rosenallis	Netwatch Cullen Park, Carlow
	C Doyle (0-7, 0-6 frees), K Guidera (1-2), B Doyle (0-3, 0-2 frees), J Carroll (0-1 free); L Galway (0-1), C Lennon (0-1).	Report	P Keating (0-9, 0-4 frees, 65), D Callally (2-0), B Fitzpatrick (1-2, 0-1 free), J Friel (0-1).	Referee: S Guinan (Offaly)

Quarter-finals

2 November 2019 Quarter-final	Rosenallis	1-12 - 3-18	Tullaroan	O'Moore Park, Portlaoise
	R Murray (1-2); B Fitzpatrick (0-5); J Friel (0-2); S Kelly, FC Fennell, J Lenmnon (0-1 each).	Report	T Walsh (2-2); M Keoghan (1-4); S Walsh (0-6); D Simpson (0-2); T Walsh (Village), J Walton, P Walsh, S Dowling (0-1 each).

2 November 2019 Quarter-final	Cloughbawn	0-09 - 0-14	Naas	Bellefield GAA Complex, Enniscorthy
	H Kehoe 0-6 (0-5fs), B Whitty 0-2 (0-2fs), MJ Furlong 0-1.	Report	B Byrne 0-4 (0-4fs), J Sheridan 0-4 (0-2fs), J Burke 0-4, S Ryan 0-1, S Gainey 0-1.	Referee: R Fitzsimons (Offaly)

2 November 2019 Quarter-final	Bray Emmets	2-17 - 1-07	Scoil Uí Chonaill	Joule Park, Aughrim
	C Moorehouse 0-8, P Doyle 1-1, D Maloney 1-1, E McCormack 0-3, D Masterson 0-2, M Lennon 0-2.

2 November 2019 Quarter-final	Kildalkey	0-10 - 1-18	Seir Kieran	St. Loman's Park, Trim
	N Potterton 0-9, E Fitzgerald 0-1.		J Bergin 0-9, P Murray 1-1, A Hynes 0-2, J Mulrooney 0-2, J Scully 0-1, K Dunne 0-1, M Gilligan 0-1, K Murray 0-1.	Referee: B Nea (Westmeath)

Semi-finals

16 November 2019 Semi-final	Tullaroan	3-17 - 1-13	Naas	John Locke Park, Callan
	S Walsh 0-8 (0-3fs), M Keoghan 2-1, Peter Walsh 1-1, B Gaffney 0-4, D Simpson 0-2, Padraig Walsh 0-1, J Walton 0-1.	Report	J Sheridan 1-3 (0-1f), B Byrne 0-6 (0-4fs), J Burke 0-3, J O'Malley 0-1.

16 November 2019 Semi-final	Bray Emmets	0-13 - 1-13	Seir Kieran	Aughrim County Ground, Aughrim
	C Moorehouse (0-08; 0-07f), D Masterson (0-03), E McCormack (0-01), M Lennon (0-01).	Report	J Bergin (1-04; 0-02f; 0-02 65'), S Hynes (0-03), J Mulrooney (0-02), B Kealy (0-01), E Murphy (0-01), K Dunne (0-01), T Carroll (0-01).

Final

30 November 2019 Final	Tullaroan	2-25 - 2-13	Seir Kieran	UPMC Nowlan Park, Kilkenny
	S Walsh (2-13, 0-11 frees); Peter Walsh, B Gaffney (0-3 each); J Walton, T Walsh (0-2 each); M Walsh, T Dunne (0-1 each).	Report	J Bergin (1-6, 1-4 frees, 0-1 65); A Hynes (1-2); J Mulrooney (0-3); E Murphy, T Carroll (0-1 each).	Referee: Chris Mooney (Dublin)

=== Munster Intermediate Club Hurling Championship ===
Quarter-finals

3 November 2019 Quarter-final	Blackrock	1-20 - 2-19 (aet)	Fr. O'Neill's	Kilfinane
	P Leahy (0-7, 0-5 frees), R O’Shaughnessy (0-5), G O’Loughlin (1-1, 1-0 pen), D Dawson (0-3), K Palmer (0-2), M Farrell (free) and D Moloney (0-1 each).	Report	D Dalton (1-9, 0-7 frees, 0-1 65), B Dunne (1-1), M O’Keeffe (0-3), T Millerick (0-2), J Millerick, K O’Sullivan, L O’Driscoll and J Hankard (0-1 each).	Referee: P Kelly (Tipperary)

3 November 2019 Quarter-final	Ballysaggart	2-14 - 0-15	Causeway	Fraher Field, Dungarvan
	S Bennett (0-9, 7f, 1’65’), K Cashell and C O’Gorman (1-1 each), K Bennett (0-2), R Walsh (0-1).	Report	B Barrett (0-7, 6f), J Diggins (0-3), G Dooley, C Harty (0-2 each), T Casey (0-1).	Referee: J Murphy (Limerick)

Semi-finals

10 November 2019 Semi-final	Fr. O'Neill's	3-22 - 0-14	Broadford	Castletownroche
	D Dalton (1-12, 0-7f, 0-1 ’65); B Dunne (2-1); R Cullinane, P McMahon (0-3 each); K O’Sullivan, M O’Keeffe, J Hankard (0-1 each).	Report	S Taylor (0-5, 0-1f); Diarmaid Moloney (0-3); N Moloney (0-2); Craig Chaplin, Donie Whelan, S McMahon, P Hickey (0-1 each).	Referee: J McCormack (Tipperary)

10 November 2019 Semi-final	Ballysaggart	0-15 - 1-11	Seán Treacy's	Fraher Field, Dungarvan
	Stephen Bennett (0-9, 0-7 frees, 0-1 ‘65s), Shane Bennett (0-3), K Bennett (0-2), R Walsh (0-1).	Report	P Carey (0-9, 0-5 frees, 0-2 ‘65s), S Ryan (1-0), J Ryan (0-1), D Kennedy (0-1).	Referee: J O'Halloran (Limerick)

Final

24 November 2019 Final	Ballysaggart	0-17 - 2-15	Fr. O'Neill's	Fraher Field, Dungarvan
	Stephen Bennett (0-8, 0-5 frees), C Murphy (0-4), Shane Bennett (0-2 frees), Chris O’Gorman (0-2), K Cashel (0-1).	Report	D Dalton (1-7, 0-7 frees),B Dunne (1-1), P McMahon (0-2), J Millerick, R Cullinane, E Conway, J Hankard and L O’Driscoll (0-1 each).	Referee: J McCormack (Tipperary)

=== Ulster Intermediate Club Hurling Championship ===
Quarter-finals

12 October 2019 Quarter-final	Lisbellaw St. Patrick's	3-15 - 4-16	Dungannon Eoghan Ruadh	Brewster Park, Enniskillen
	C Corrigan 3-1, J Duffy 0-6, D McGarry 0-2, F McBrien 0-2, B McPhillips 0-2, N Timmoney 0-1.		D Casey 2-7, K Morgan 1-3, B Molloy 1-2, M Mulgrew 0-2, L Devlin 0-1, J McIntosh 0-1.	Referee: T Conway (Derry)

12 October 2019 Quarter-final	Castleblayney	0-13 - 2-11	Bredagh	St. Mary's Park, Castleblayney

13 October 2019 Quarter-final	Setanta	3-13 - 1-25	Keady Lámh Dhearg	O'Donnell Park, Letterkenny
	D Coulter 0-8, M Devine 1-3, D Flynn 1-2, G Gilmore 1-0.		P Greene 0-8, J Corvan 0-6, L McIlroy 1-2, C Corvan 0-4, F Donnelly 0-3, P McCormack 0-1, S Reneghan 0-1.	Referee: C Cunning (Antrim)

13 October 2019 Quarter-final	Banagher	0-12 - 1-10	Naomh Éanna	Owenbeg Complex, Derry
	D Cartin 0-3, T McCloskey 0-3, J O'Dwyer 0-2, S McCloskey 0-2, S McCullagh 0-1, C Lynch 0-1.		J McGoldrick 0-4, P Curran 1-0, P Curran 0-1, K Jennings 0-1, M O'Hare 0-1, R Crummery 0-1, R Donaghy 0-1.	Referee: J Connors (Donegal)

Semi-finals

26 October 2019 Semi-final	Dungannon Eoghan Ruadh	1-16 - 0-15	Keady Lámh Dhearg	Páirc Esler, Newry
	D Casey 0-12, K Morgan 1-1, M Mulgrew 0-1, M Devlin 0-1, T Morgan 0-1.		F Donnelly 0-7, C Corvan 0-3, P Green 0-2, C Rafferty 0-2, L McIlroy 0-1.	Referee: C Murray (Down)

26 October 2019 Semi-final	Bredagh	0-16 - 0-18	Naomh Éanna	Keady
	I Galway 0-7 (5 f’s, 1 ’65); R Costello 0-3; S Hughes 0-2; S McGourty 0-2; C Hughes 0-1; D Hughes 0-1.	Report	J McGoldrick 0-5 (5 f’s); C Ross 0-3; C Jennings 0-2 (1 f); R Bogue 0-2; E O’Connor 0-2; J Maskey 0-1; R Donaghy 0-1; M Mullan 0-1; K Jennings 0-1.

Final

17 November 2019 Final	Dungannon Eoghan Ruadh	2-20 - 2-20 (aet) (Naomh Éanna won 1-0 on penalties)	Naomh Éanna	Celtic Park, Derry
	D Casey 0-13, K Morgan 1-1, L Devlin 1-0, T Morgan 0-2, T McIntosh 0-2, M Mulgrew 0-1, B Molloy 0-1.		J McGoldrick 1-11, R Donaghy 1-3, M O'Hare 0-2, C Ross 0-1, K Jennings 0-1, E O'Connor 0-1, J Maskey 0-1.	Referee: T Conway (Derry)

== All-Ireland Intermediate Club Hurling Championship ==
=== Semi-finals ===
4 January 2020 Semi-final	Fr. O'Neill's	0-19 - 1-12	Tooreen	Bord na Móna O'Connor Park, Tullamore
	D Dalton 0-10 (0-7f), M O’Keeffe & K O’Sullivan 0-2 each, P McMahon, E Conway, B Dunne, C Broderick & L O’Driscoll 0-1 each.	Report	S Boland 0-6f, K Feeney 1-2 (0-2f), F Boland 0-2, C Freeman, & G Nolan 0-1 each.	Referee: C Mooney (Dublin)

4 January 2020 Semi-final	Tullaroan	3-20 - 0-14	Naomh Éanna	Parnell Park, Dublin
	S Walsh (0-9); T Walsh (2-1); M Keoghan (1-1); M Walsh (0-3); Padraig Walsh, J Keoghan, T Dunne, B Gaffney, J Walton, S Cuddihy (0-1 each).	Report	J McGoldrick (0-6; R Bogue (0-3); K Jennings (0-2); C Ross, R Donaghy, M O’Hare (0-1 each).	Referee: S Hayes (Galway)

=== Final ===
18 January 2020 Final	Fr. O'Neill's	5-12 - 3-19	Tullaroan	Croke Park, Dublin
	D Dalton 2-4 (0-2f, 0-1 65), E Conway 1-1, C Broderick and J Hankard 1-0 each, P McMahon and K O’Sullivan 0-2 each, R Cullinane, S O’Connor and T Millerick 0-1 each.	Report	S Walsh 0-10 (0-4f, 0-1 65), M Keoghan 2-1, P Walsh 1-2, J Walton and T Walsh 0-2 each, B Gaffney and P Walsh 0-1 each.	Attendance: 5,498; Referee: T Walsh (Waterford)

== Championship statistics ==
=== Top scorers ===
Top scorers overall

Rank	Player	Club	Tally	Total	Matches	Average
1	Declan Dalton	Fr. O'Neill's	5-42	57	5	11.40
2	Shane Walsh	Tullaroan	2-46	52	5	10.40
3	Damian Casey	Dungannon Eoghan Ruadh	2-32	38	3	12.66
4	Shane Boland	Tooreen	0-36	36	4	9.00
5	John McGoldrick	Naomh Éanna	1-26	29	4	7.25
6	Stephen Bennett	Ballysaggart	0-26	26	3	8.66
7	Joe Bergin	Seir Kieran	2-19	26	3	8.66
8	Martin Keoghan	Tullaroan	6-07	25	5	5.00
9	Tommy Walsh	Tullaroan	4-07	19	5	3.80
10	Kenny Feeney	Tooreen	1-14	17	4	4.25

Top scorers in a single game

Rank	Player	Club	Tally	Total	Opposition
1	Shane Walsh	Tullaroan	2-13	19	Seir Kieran
2	Declan Dalton	Fr. O'Neill's	1-12	15	Broadford
3	John McGoldrick	Naomh Éanna	1-11	14	Dungannon Eoghan Ruadh
3	Shane Boland	Tooreen	0-14	14	Robert Emmets
5	Damian Casey	Dungannon Eoghan Ruadh	2-07	13	Lisbellaw St. Patrick's
5	Damian Casey	Dungannon Eoghan Ruadh	0-13	13	Naomh Éanna
7	Declan Dalton	Fr. O'Neill's	1-09	12	Blackrock
7	Benny McCarry	Robert Emmets	0-12	12	Tooreen
7	Damian Casey	Dungannon Eoghan Ruadh	0-12	12	Keady Lámh Dhearg
10	Shane Boland	Tooreen	0-11	11	Kinvara
