= Shane Walsh (Kilkenny hurler) =

Irish hurler

Personal information
- Native name: Seán Breathnach (Irish)
- Born: 10 January 1996 (age 30) Tullaroan, County Kilkenny, Ireland
- Height: 5 ft 7 in (170 cm)

Sport
- Sport: Hurling
- Position: Right corner-forward
Club
- Years: Club
- Tullaroan
Club titles
- Kilkenny titles: 0
Inter-county*
Years	County	Apps (scores)
2022-present	Kilkenny	2 (0-00)
Inter-county titles
- Leinster titles: 1
- All-Irelands: 0
- NHL: 0
- All Stars: 0
- *Inter County team apps and scores correct as of 21:25, 6 February 2022.

Shane Walsh (born 10 January 1996) is an Irish hurler. At club level he plays with Tullaroan and at inter-county level with the Kilkenny senior hurling team.

== Honours ==
Tullaroan

- All-Ireland Intermediate Club Hurling Championship: 2020 (c)
- Leinster Intermediate Club Hurling Championship: 2019 (c)
- Kilkenny Intermediate Hurling Championship: 2019 (c)

Kilkenny

- Leinster Senior Hurling Championship: 2022
- Leinster Under-21 Hurling Championship: 2017
