= Ted Carroll (hurler) =

Irish hurler (1939–1995)

Personal information
- Native name: Éamon Ó Cearrbhaill (Irish)
- Nickname: Ted
- Born: 19 February 1939 Lisdowney, County Kilkenny, Ireland
- Died: 22 December 1995 (aged 56) Kilkenny, Ireland
- Occupation: Agricultural advisor
- Height: 5 ft 11 in (180 cm)

Sport
- Sport: Hurling
- Position: Centre-back
Clubs
- Years: Club
- 1954-1978 1958-1962: Lisdowney; University College Dublin
Club titles
- Dublin titles: 1
College
- Years: College
- 1958-1962: University College Dublin
College titles
- Fitzgibbon titles: 3
Inter-county*
Years	County	Apps (scores)
1961-1971	Kilkenny	22 (0-00)
Inter-county titles
- Leinster titles: 5
- All-Irelands: 3
- NHL: 1
- *Inter County team apps and scores correct as of 17:38, 30 June 2015.

Edmund Gerard "Ted" Carroll (19 February 1939 – 22 December 1995) was an Irish hurler who played as a centre-back for the Kilkenny senior team.

Born in Lisdowney, County Kilkenny, Carroll first played competitive hurling during his schooling at St. Kieran's College. He arrived on the inter-county scene at the age of eighteen when he first linked up with the Kilkenny minor team. He made his senior debut during the 1971 championship. Carroll subsequently became a regular member of the starting fifteen and won three All-Ireland medals, five Leinster medals and one National Hurling League medal. He was an All-Ireland runner-up on three occasions.

As a member of the Leinster inter-provincial team on a number of occasions Carroll won one Railway Cup medal. At club level he won one championship medal with University College Dublin while he also enjoyed a lengthy career with Lisdowney.

His brother-in-law, Jimmy O'Brien, was a two-time All-Ireland medallist with Wexford.

Throughout his career Carroll made 22 championship appearances. He retired from inter-county hurling following the conclusion of the 1971 championship.

In retirement from playing Carroll became involved in the administrative affairs of the Gaelic Athletic Association. He served as secretary of the Kilkenny County Board between 1984 and 1995.

In 1969, Carrol was selected as the Texaco Hurler of the Year. He has sometimes been voted onto teams made up of the sport's greats, including at centre-back on the Fitzgibbon Cup Hurling Team of the Century in 2012.

== Playing career ==
=== College ===
During his schooling at St. Kieran's College in Kilkenny, Carroll established himself as a key member of the senior hurling team. In 1957 he was captain of the team and won a Leinster medal following a 6-3 to 3-0 defeat of Patrician College. St. Flannan's College provided the opposition in the subsequent All-Ireland decider and held the lead until the dying minutes. A late goal at the death secured a remarkable 4-2 to 2-7 victory for St. Kieran's and an All-Ireland medal for Carroll.

=== University ===
During his studies at University College Dublin, Carroll quickly came to the attention of the selectors of the college hurling team. In 1958 he failed to make the starting fifteen but was included on the extended panel as the Dublin outfit faced University College Galway in the final of the Fitzgibbon Cup. A huge 7-9 to 2-1 victory gave Carroll, who came on as a substitute, a first Fitzgibbon Cup medal.

UCD surrendered their title to old rivals University College Cork in 1959, however, the sides renewed their rivalry the following year. By now Carroll was a regular at centre-back and won a second Fitzgibbon Cup medal following the 4-10 to 4-3 victory.

Carroll lined out in a fourth successive Fitzgibbon Cup decider in 1961, as University College Galway provided the opposition once again. The game was a close affair, however, a narrow 3-6 to 3-4 victory gave Carroll a third Fitzgibbon Cup medal.

=== Club ===
Carroll first enjoyed success at club level as a Gaelic footballer with Galmoy, an amalgamation of teams from Johnstown, Galmoy and Lisdowney. In 1955 he was a member of the minor team that faced St. Canice's in the minor decider. A 2-7 to 1-2 victory gave Carroll his first championship medal.

By this stage Carroll was also a regular on the Lisdowney junior team. In 1960 the team qualified for just their second ever junior championship decider, having lost at their first attempt eighteen years earlier. A hard-fought 3-8 to 2-5 defeat of Knocktopher secured a championship medal for Carroll.

His studies in Dublin also allowed Carroll to line out for University College Dublin in their county championship. A defeat of St. Vincent's in the 1961 secured a Kilkenny Senior Hurling Championship medal for Carroll.

After just two years in the top flight of Kilkenny hurling, Lisdowney qualified for the senior decider in 1962. A 5-7 to 2-8 defeat by Bennettsbridge resulted in disappointment for Carroll.

By 1978 Carroll was approaching forty years of age, however, he still continued to line out with Lisdowney who were now playing in the intermediate grade. The club reached the final that year, however, a 2-21 to 4-7 score line resulted in defeat of Carroll's side.

=== Minor ===
Carroll was seventeen year-old when he was called up to the Kilkenny minor team in 1956. He won a Leinster medal that year following a 4–7 to 3–7 defeat of Wexford in the provincial decider. On 23 September 1956 Kilkenny faced Tipperary in the All-Ireland final. A 4–16 to 1–5 trouncing, with teen sensation Jimmy Doyle contributing 2-3, resulted in defeat for Carroll and his side.

The following year Carroll added a second Leinster medal to his collection, as Offaly were defeated by 5–10 to 4–2. For the second year in-a-row, Tipperary provided the opposition in the All-Ireland final on 1 September 1957. In a close game Tipperary eventually triumphed by 4–7 to 3–7.

=== Senior ===
==== Early success ====
Carroll made his senior championship debut on 18 June 1961 in a 6-8 to 5-7 Leinster semi-final defeat by Wexford.

After two years without success, Carroll won his first Leinster medal in 1963 following a 2–10 to 0–9 defeat of Dublin. This victory allowed Kilkenny to advance directly into an All-Ireland showdown with Waterford on 1 September 1963. "The Cats" entered the game as underdogs, however, Eddie Keher proved to be the difference with a magnificent display in which he scored fourteen points. Despite a hat-trick of goals from Waterford's Séamus Power, Kilkenny secured a 4–17 to 6–8 victory. It was Carroll's first All-Ireland medal.

==== All-Ireland defeats ====
Carroll added a second Leinster medal to his collection in 1964 as Dublin were defeated on a 4–11 to 1–8 score line. The All-Ireland final on 6 September 1964 saw Kilkenny enter the game as firm favourites against fierce rivals Tipperary. John "Mackey" McKenna scored Tipperary's first goal after ten minutes as the Munster champions took a 1–8 to 0–6 interval lead. The second half saw Tipperary score goals for fun, with Donie Nealon getting a hat-trick and Seán McLoughlin another. Kilkenny were humiliated at the full-time whistle as Tipperary triumphed by 5–13 to 2–8.

After surrendering their provincial crown in 1965, Kilkenny bounced back the following year by reaching the final of the National Hurling League. An aggregate 10–15 to 2–15 defeat of New York gave Carroll a league medal. He later won a third Leinster medal following a 1–15 to 2–6 defeat of Wexford. The subsequent All-Ireland final on 4 September 1966 pitted Kilkenny against Cork for the first time in nineteen years. Kilkenny were the favourites, however, a hat-trick of goals by Colm Sheehan gave Cork a merited 3–9 to 1–10 victory.

==== Kilkenny resurgence ====
Carroll was moved to left corner-back in 1967 and collected a fourth Leinster medal as Kilkenny retained their provincial crown following a 4–10 to 1–12 defeat of Wexford after a scare in the opening half. On 3 September 1967 Kilkenny faced Tipperary in the All-Ireland decider. Tipperary looked like continuing their hoodoo over their near rivals as they took a 2–6 to 1–3 lead at half-time. Goalkeeper Ollie Walsh was the hero for Kilkenny as he made a series of spectacular saves, however, the team lost Eddie Keher and Tom Walsh to injury in the second half. In spite of this, Kilkenny laid to rest a bogey that Tipperary had over the team since 1922, and a 3–8 to 2–7 victory gave Carroll a second All-Ireland medal. He finished off the year by claiming an Oireachtas medal following a 4-4 to 1-8 defeat of Clare.

Wexford ended Kilkenny's hopes of retaining the title in 1968. However, Kilkenny won the provincial title the following year with Carroll collecting a fifth Leinster medal following a 3–9 to 0–16 defeat of Offaly in the final. On 7 September 1969, Kilkenny took on Cork in the All-Ireland decider. Cork got into their stride following an early goal by Charlie McCarthy and led by six points coming up to half time when Kilkenny scored a goal themselves. Kilkenny upped their performance after the interval and ran out winners on a 2–15 to 2–9 scoreline. The victory gave Carroll a third All-Ireland medal as well as the man of the match title, while he was later named as the Texaco Hurler of the Year. Cork and Kilkenny met again before the end of the year, and a 4-14 to 3-10 victory gave Carroll a second Oireachtas medal.

==== Decline ====
After surrendering their provincial and All-Ireland crowns to Wexford the following year, Carroll was dropped from the starting fifteen in 1971. He was a non-playing substitute as Kilkenny defeated Wexford by 6-16 to 3-16 to take the Leinster title once again. On 5 September 1971 Kilkenny faced Tipperary in the All-Ireland final, however, Carroll still remained on the bench. He was introduced as a substitute for "Fan" Larkin, however, Tipperary emerged the victors on a score line of 5–17 to 5–14. This defeat brought the curtain down on Carroll’s inter-county career.

=== Inter-provincial ===
In 1965 Carroll was at centre-back on the Leinster inter-provincial team. He won a Railway Cup medal that year following Leinster's 2-11 to 0-9 defeat of Munster.

== Post-playing career ==
In retirement from playing Carroll became involved in the administrative affairs of the Gaelic Athletic Association. In 1982 he was elected chairman of the Northern Board before taking over as secretary of the Kilkenny County Board in 1984. Carroll held this position for over a decade.

== Personal life ==
Born in Lisdowney, County Kilkenny, Carroll and his twin brother, Mick, were raised on the family farm. Educated locally at Lisdowney National School, he was enrolled in St. Kieran's College in 1952. After finishing his studies here in 1958, Carroll was accepted to University College Dublin, however, an administrative error meant that he received no notification of the fact that he had been accepted to the veterinary course. Instead he started studying agricultural science and, following his graduation, Carroll began working with Teagasc.

Carroll married Angela Lenehan, a native of Kilkenny city, in 1966 and settled down in the Dicksboro area of Kilkenny. The couple had five children: Pat (born 1967), Donal (born 1969), Helen (born 1971), Ted (born 1973) and David (born 1977).

On 22 December 1995 Carroll died suddenly.

== Honours ==
=== Player ===
St. Kieran's College

- All-Ireland Colleges Senior Hurling Championship (1): 1957 (c)
- Leinster Colleges Senior Hurling Championship (1): 1957 (c)
- Leinster Colleges Junior Hurling Championship (1): 1956

Galmoy

- Kilkenny Minor Football Championship (1): 1955

Lisdowney

- Kilkenny Junior Hurling Championship (1): 1960

University College Dublin

- Fitzgibbon Cup (3): 1958, 1960, 1961
- Dublin Senior Hurling Championship (1): 1961

Kilkenny

- All-Ireland Senior Hurling Championship (3): 1963, 1967, 1969
- Leinster Senior Hurling Championship (6): 1963, 1964, 1966, 1967, 1969, 1971 (sub)
- National Hurling League (1): 1965-66
- Oireachtas Tournament (3): 1966 (sub), 1967, 1969
- Leinster Minor Hurling Championship (2): 1956, 1957

Leinster

- Railway Cup (1): 1965

=== Individual ===
Honours

- Fitzgibbon Cup Team of the Century: Centre-back
- Texaco Hurler of the Year (1): 1969
- All-Ireland Senior Hurling Final Man of the Match (1): 1969

Awards
Preceded by Dan Quigley (Kilkenny)	Texaco Hurler of the Year; 1969	Succeeded by Pat McDonnell (Cork)
Sporting positions
Preceded by Paddy Grace	Secretary of the Kilkenny County Board; 1984-1995	Succeeded by Pat Dunphy
