= Jimmy Coogan =

Irish hurler (born 1978)

Personal information
- Native name: Séamus Ó Cuagáin (Irish)
- Born: 24 April 1978 (age 48) Tullaroan, County Kilkenny, Ireland
- Occupation: Primary Teacher
- Height: 6 ft 1 in (185 cm)

Sport
- Sport: Hurling
- Position: Left wing-forward
Club
- Years: Club
- Tullaroan
Club titles
- Kilkenny titles: 0
Inter-county*
Years	County	Apps (scores)
2000–2005	Kilkenny	11 (2-7)
Inter-county titles
- Leinster titles: 3
- All-Irelands: 3
- NHL: 2
- All Stars: 0
- *Inter County team apps and scores correct as of 21:02, 4 February 2015.

James Michael Coogan (born 24 April 1978) is an Irish retired hurler who played as a left wing-forward for the Kilkenny senior team.

Born in Tullaroan, County Kilkenny, Coogan first played competitive hurling during his schooling at St. Kieran's College. He arrived on the inter-county scene at the age of seventeen when he first linked up with the Kilkenny minor team before later joining the under-21 side. He joined the senior team during the 2000 championship. Coogan later became a regular member of the starting fifteen, and won two All-Ireland medals and one National Hurling League medal.

As a member of the Leinster inter-provincial team on a number of occasions, Coogan won one Railway Cup medal. At club level he played with Tullaroan.

His brother, Ken, was also an All-Ireland medallist with Kilkenny.

Throughout his career Coogan made 11 championship appearances. He retired from inter-county hurling following the conclusion of the 2005 league.

At the moment he is teaching. He has a job in St. Brendans Muckalee NS.

== Playing career ==
=== Colleges ===
During his schooling at St. Kieran's College in Kilkenny, Coogan established himself as a key member of the senior hurling team. In 1996 he won his sole Leinster medal as Good Counsel College were narrowly defeated by 1–7 to 1–6. St. Colman's College provided the opposition in the subsequent All-Ireland decider. A 1–14 to 2–6 victory gave Coogan an All-Ireland medal.

=== Club ===
Coogan plays his club hurling with the Tullaroan club in Kilkenny.

=== Inter-county ===
==== Minor and under-21 ====
Coogan first played for Kilkenny in 1996 when he joined the minor side. He won his sole Leinster medal that year as Dublin were accounted for on a 1–16 to 1–11 score line. The All-Ireland campaign came to an end at the semi-final stage.

In 1998 Coogan was a member of the Kilkenny under-21 team. A 2–10 to 0–12 defeat of Dublin in the provincial decider gave him his first Leinster medal in that grade.

Coogan won a second Leinster medal in 1999, following a 1–17 to 1-6 trouncing of Offaly. The subsequent All-Ireland decider was a thrilling affair, with Kilkenny securing a narrow 1–13 to 0–14 defeat of Galway to give Coogan his sole All-Ireland medal.

==== Senior ====
Coogan later joined the county senior team, making his championship debut against Dublin in 2000. In 2001 Coogan smashed his right knee during a club game and completely severed his cruciate ligament. He also suffered damage to the medial ligament and his cartilage was torn so badly that it had to be removed. His thigh bone had also been cracked. The injury had the potential to end his career, however, Coogan fought back and made a miraculous recovery. He returned to inter-county action in time to claim a National Hurling League medal in 2002. He made his championship return in the All-Ireland semi-final and scored a goal and a point against Tipperary to put Kilkenny into the final. Coogan later collected his first senior All-Ireland medal as Kilkenny defeated Clare in the championship decider playing at wing forward in the All Ireland Final. Coogan won his second league medal and third All Ireland the following September when Kilkenny defeated Cork in the final.

== Career statistics ==
Team	Year	National League			Leinster		All-Ireland		Total	
Team	Year	Division	Apps	Score	Apps	Score	Apps	Score	Apps	Score
Kilkenny	2000	Division 1B	x	x-xx	1	0-00	0	0-00	x	x-xx
Kilkenny	2001	Division 1B	7	1-27	1	0-00	0	0-00	8	1-27
Kilkenny	2002	Division 1A	0	0-00	0	0-00	1	1-01	1	1-01
Kilkenny	2003	Division 1A	6	0-23	0	0-00	2	0-01	8	0-24
Kilkenny	2004	Division 1A	5	2-20	2	1-03	2	0-01	9	3-24
Kilkenny	2005	Division 1A	3	0-08	0	0-00	0	0-00	3	0-08
Total			x	x-xx	4	1-03	5	1-03	x	x-xx
