= Owen Wall =

Irish hurler (born 1999)

Personal information
- Native name: Eoin de Bhál (Irish)
- Born: 1999 (age 26–27) Kilkenny, Ireland
- Occupation: Soldier

Sport
- Sport: Hurling
- Position: Left corner-forward
Club*
Years	Club	Apps (scores)
2017-present	O'Loughlin Gaels	16 (7-11)
Club titles
- Kilkenny titles: 1
- Leinster titles: 1
- All-Ireland Titles: 0
Inter-county**
Years	County	Apps (scores)
2024-	Kilkenny	5 (3-05)
Inter-county titles
- Leinster titles: 0
- All-Irelands: 0
- NHL: 0
- All Stars: 0
- * club appearances and scores correct as of 23:26, 18 May 2024. **Inter County team apps and scores correct as of 21:26, 26 May 2024.

Owen Wall (born 1999) is an Irish hurler. At club level he plays with O'Loughlin Gaels and at inter-county level with the Kilkenny senior hurling team.

== Career ==
Wall first played hurling at juvenile and underage levels with the O'Loughlin Gaels club in Kilkenny. He won a Kilkenny MAHC medal in 2017, before claiming a Kilkenny U21AHC title two years later. He also played hurling as a student at St Kieran's College around this time. Wall eventually progressed to adult club level and won a Kilkenny SHC title in 2023. This was later followed by Leinster Club SHC success, however, O'Loughlin Gaels were beaten by St Thomas' in the 2020 All-Ireland club final.

Wall never played at minor or under-21 levels with Kilkenny, however, club success resulted in him being drafted onto the Kilkenny senior hurling team in 2024.

== Career statistics ==
=== Club ===
As of match played 21 January 2024.

Team	Year	Cork		Munster		All-Ireland		Total	
Team	Year	Apps	Score	Apps	Score	Apps	Score	Apps	Score
O'Loughlin Gaels	2017-18	0	0-00	—		—		0	0-00
O'Loughlin Gaels	2018-19	0	0-00	—		—		0	0-00
O'Loughlin Gaels	2019-20	1	0-00	—		—		1	0-00
O'Loughlin Gaels	2020-21	2	0-03	—		—		2	0-03
O'Loughlin Gaels	2021-22	4	4-05	—		—		4	4-05
O'Loughlin Gaels	2022-23	1	0-00	—		—		1	0-00
O'Loughlin Gaels	2023-24	3	2-01	3	1-02	2	0-00	8	3-03
Total		11	6-09	3	1-02	2	0-00	16	7-11

=== Inter-county ===
As of 26 May 2024

Team	Year	National League			Leinster		All-Ireland		Total	
Team	Year	Division	Apps	Score	Apps	Score	Apps	Score	Apps	Score
Kilkenny	2024	Division 1A	1	0-00	5	3-05	0	0-00	6	3-05
Career total			1	0-00	5	3-05	0	0-00	6	3-05

== Honours ==
O'Loughlin Gaels

- Leinster Senior Club Hurling Championship: 2023
- Kilkenny Senior Hurling Championship: 2023
- Kilkenny Junior Hurling Championship: 2019
- Kilkenny Under-21 A Hurling Championship: 2019
- Kilkenny Minor A Hurling Championship: 2017
