= 2015 Croke Cup =

Irish hurling competition

- Dates: 14 March - 4 April 2015
- Teams: 6
- Sponsor: Masita
- Champions: St Kieran's College (20th title); Seán Morrissey (captain)
- Runners-up: Thurles CBS; Ronan Teehan (captain)

Tournament statistics
- Matches played: 5
- Goals scored: 5 (1 per match)
- Points scored: 141 (28.2 per match)
- Top scorer(s): Ray Lahart (1-14)

The 2015 Croke Cup was the 64th staging of the Croke Cup since its establishment by the Gaelic Athletic Association in 1944. The competition ran from 14 March to 4 April 2015.

St Kieran's College were the defending champions.

The final was played on 4 April 2015 at Semple Stadium in Thurles, between St Kieran's College and Thurles CBS, in what was their first ever meeting in the final. St Kieran's College won the match by 1–15 to 1–12 to claim their 20th Croke Cup title overall and a second successive title.

Ray Lahart was the top scorer with 1–14.

== Qualification ==
Province	Champions	Runners-up
Connacht	Presentation College	St Brigid's College
Leinster	St Kieran's College	St Peter's College
Munster	Thurles CBS	St Francis College

== Results ==
=== Quarter-finals ===
14 March 2015 Quarter-final	St Kieran's College	2-11 - 0-10	St Francis College	Fraher Field
	T O’Dwyer 1-1; N Walsh 1-0; R Leahy 0-3; J Connolly (free), R Lahart (frees) (0-2 each); L Blanchfield, S Morrissey, J Byrne (s-l) 0-1 each.	Report	C Cormack 0-7 (6 frees, 1 65’); S Kingston, D Kelliher, J O’Sullivan 0-1 each.	Referee: J Owens (Wexford)

14 March 2015 Quarter-final	St Peter's College	0-17 - 0-10	St Brigid's College	Ashbourne Grounds
	B Dunne (0-4, 3 frees), J O'Connor (0-4), R O'Connor (0-3), R White (0-2); J Pettit (0-2), C Hearne (0-1), J Firman (0-1).	Report	J Kenny (0-4 frees); R Murphy (0-2), C Molloy (0-2 frees), M Lynch (0-1), P Boreham (0-1).

=== Semi-finals ===
19 March 2015 Semi-final	Thurles CBS	0-18 - 1-12	St Peter's College	WIT GAA Grounds
	N Heffernan 0-5 (4f), R Teehan, R Long, K Duggan 0-3 each, B McCarthy 0-2, C Moloney, M Connors 0-1 each.	Report	B Dunne 0-4f, R O'Connor 1-1, M Joyce 0-3, J Firman, C Hearne, J Pettit, R White 0-1 each.	Referee: D Kirwan (Cork)

21 March 2015 Semi-final	St Kieran's College	0-19 - 0-17	Presentation College	St Rynagh's Park
	R Lahart 0-7 (6f 1’65), J Connolly 0-4 (2f), J Byrne 0-3, L Branchfield, T O’Dwyer 0-2 each, B Ryan 0-1.	Report	E Niland 0-11 (7f), B Burke 0-4 (2f), S Loftus, C Burke 0-1 each.	Referee: D Kirwan (Cork)

=== Final ===
4 April 2015 Final	St Kieran's College	1-15 - 1-12	Thurles CBS	Semple Stadium
	R Lahart 1-5 (0-4fs, 0-1 '65'), B Ryan 0-3, R Leahy, S Morrissey 0-2 each, J Byrne, L Blanchfield, T O'Dwyer 0-1 each.		M Connors 1-2, N Heffernan 0-5 (4f), J Skehan, R Heffernan, B McCarthy, K Duggan, R Long 0-1 each.	Referee: J Keenan (Wicklow)

== Statistics ==
=== Top scorers ===
Rank	Player	Club	Tally	Total	Matches	Average
1	Ray Lahart	St Kieran's College	1-14	17	3	5.66
2	Evan Niland	Presentation College	0-11	11	1	11.00
3	Niall Heffernan	Thurles CBS	0-10	10	2	5.00
4	Billy Dunne	St Peter's College	0-08	8	2	4.00
5	Rory O'Connor	St Peter's College	1-04	7	2	3.50
5	Tadhg O'Dwyer	St Kieran's College	1-04	7	3	2.33
5	Cathal Cormack	St Francis College	0-07	7	1	7.00
