= 2020 Kilkenny Intermediate Hurling Championship =

- Dates: 29 August 2020 – 26 September 2020
- Teams: 12
- Sponsor: Michael Lyng Motors Hyundai
- Champions: Lisdowney (1st title); Vincent Fitzpatrick (captain); Patrick O'Carroll (captain); Martin Power (manager)
- Runners-up: Thomastown
- Relegated: St. Patrick's Ballyragget

Tournament statistics
- Matches played: 14
- Goals scored: 35 (2.5 per match)
- Points scored: 493 (35.21 per match)

The 2020 Kilkenny Intermediate Hurling Championship was the 56th staging of the Kilkenny Intermediate Hurling Championship since its establishment by the Kilkenny County Board in 1929. The championship began on 29 August 2020 and ended on 26 September 2020.

On 26 September 2020, Lisdowney won the championship after a 4–3 victory in a penalty shoot-out against Thomastown in the final at UMPC Nowlan Park. It was their first ever championship title.

== Team changes ==
=== To Championship ===
Promoted from the Kilkenny Junior Hurling Championship

- O'Loughlin Gaels

Relegated from the Kilkenny Senior Hurling Championship

- St. Patrick's Ballyragget

=== From Championship ===
Promoted to the Kilkenny Senior Hurling Championship

- Tullaroan

Relegated to the Kilkenny Junior Hurling Championship

- Tullogher-Rosbercon

== Results ==
=== First round ===
29 August 2020 First round	Young Irelands	1-21 - 1-21; Penalties: 3-2	St. Patrick's Ballyragget	Canon Kearns Park

29 August 2020 First round	St. Lachtain's	1-20 - 1-19	John Locke's	Tom Ryall Park

30 August 2020 First round	Carrickshock	1-16 - 0-21	St. Martin's	Páirc Shéamuis Stíophán

30 August 2020 First round	Fenians	1-12 - 3-19	O'Loughlin Gaels	Páirc Lachtain

=== Relegation playoffs ===
5 September 2020 Semi-final	Carrickshock	0-17 - 0-12	St. Patrick's Ballyragget	Clara Sportsfield

5 September 2020 Semi-final	John Locke's	1-12 - 0-10	Fenians	St. John's Park

13 September 2020 Final	St. Patrick's Ballyragget	1-20 - 4-13	Fenians	Canon Kearns Park

=== Quarter-finals ===
6 September 2020 Quarter-final	Thomastown	3-23 - 0-14	O'Loughlin Gaels	John Locke Park

6 September 2020 Quarter-final	Dunnamaggin	2-16 - 4-17	St, Lachtain's	Tullaroan Sportsfield

6 September 2020 Quarter-final	Glenmore	3-20 - 0-22	St. Martin's	Bennettsbridge Sportsfield

6 September 2020 Quarter-final	Lisdowney	1-15 - 0-15	Young Irelands	Canon Kearns Park

=== Semi-finals ===
20 September 2020 Semi-final	Glenmore	0-19 - 1-17	Lisdowney	UMPC Nowlan Park
	G Aylward 0-7, A Murphy 0-5, I Byrne 0-4, E Murphy 0-1, L Hennessy 0-1, D Burke 0-1.		A Tallis 1-6, N Brennan 0-4, C Jordan 0-3, D O'Carroll 0-2, S Phelan 0-1, C O'Carroll 0-1.

20 September 2020 Semi-final	Thomastown	2-19 - 2-17	St. Lachtain's	UMPC Nowlan Park
	R Donnelly 0-10, S Donnelly 1-3, JJ Farrell 1-1, D Barron 0-2, J Donnelly 0-2, D Caulfield 0-1.		L Hickey 2-10, J Maher 0-3, D Maher 0-1, N McGee 0-1, J Fitzpatrick 0-1, B Quinn 0-1.

=== Final ===
26 September 2020 Final	Thomastown	1-23 - 1-23 (aet); Penalties: 3-4	Lisdowney	UPMC Nowlan Park
	R Donnelly 1-12, J Donnelly 0-6, JJ Farrell 0-3, D Barron 0-1, D Waugh 0-1.		A Tallis 0-8, B Kavanagh 0-5, M Kenny 1-1, N Brennan 0-2, C Jordan 0-2, P O'Carroll 0-2, K Sweeney 0-1, W Kenny 0-1, E Hickey 0-1.
