= Lisdowney GAA =

Gaelic games club in County Kilkenny, Ireland

Lisdowney
- Lios Dúin Fhiach
- Founded: 1939
- County: Kilkenny
- Colours: Blue and white
- Grounds: Lisdowney GAA Grounds
- Coordinates: 52°47′N 7°23′W

Playing kits
Standard colours

Senior Club Championships
	All Ireland	Leinster champions	Kilkenny champions
Hurling:	0	0	0
Camogie:	1	3	5

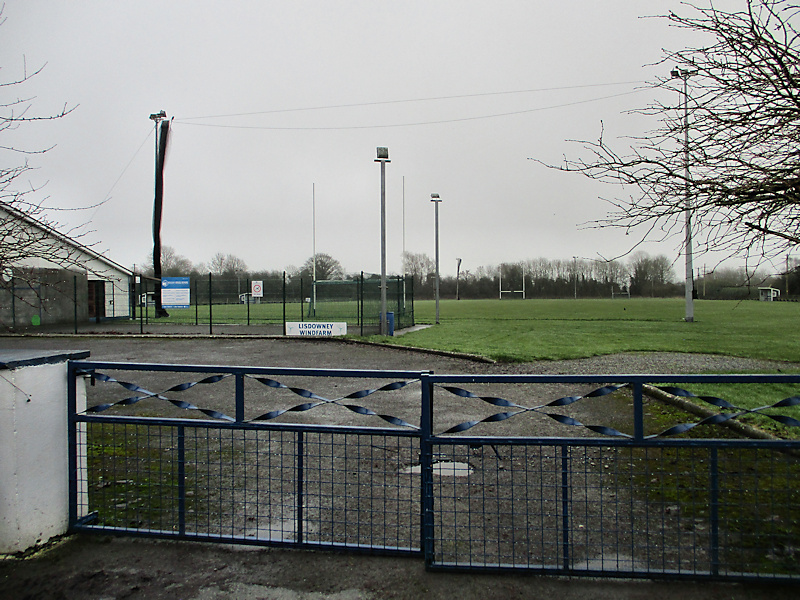
Lisdowney GAA field

Lisdowney GAA is a Gaelic Athletic Association club located in Lisdowney, County Kilkenny, Ireland. The club was founded in 1939, and is primarily concerned with hurling and camogie. The crest of Lisdowney GAA has a raven on a background of blue and white hoops. There is a raven mounted as a monument in the village centre.

== Achievements ==
- All-Ireland Senior Club Camogie Championship (1): 1994
- Leinster Senior Club Camogie Championship (3): 1993, 1994, 1997
- Kilkenny Senior Camogie Championships: (5) 1992, 1993, 1994, 1996, 1997
- Kilkenny Intermediate Hurling Championship (2): 2020, 2024.
- Kilkenny Junior Hurling Championship (2): 1960, 2013
- Leinster Junior Club Hurling Championship (0): (runner-up in 2013)
- Kilkenny Junior Football Championship (1): 2017

== Notable players ==
- Ted Carroll
- Angela Downey
- Ann Downey
