= Tullaroan =

Tullaroan Tulach Ruáin
- Village
- Location in Ireland
- Coordinates: 52°39′44″N 7°26′18″W
- Country: Ireland
- Province: Leinster
- County: County Kilkenny
- Time zone: UTC+0 (WET)
  - Summer (DST): UTC-1 (IST (WEST))

Tullaroan (Irish: Tulach Ruáin, meaning 'Rowan's hill') is a village in the western part of County Kilkenny in the Slieveardagh Hills near the Tipperary border. Tullaroan is also the name of the local civil parish.

== Sport ==
Tullaroan GAA are the most successful Gaelic Athletic Association club in County Kilkenny, having won the Kilkenny Senior Hurling Championship title twenty times, and have been finalists on eleven occasions.

== Culture ==
The most common surnames in Tullaroan in 1849-50 were Grace, Maher, Kelly, Walsh, Dunne, Connors, Dowling, Kavanagh, Fogarty and Comerford.

== Geography ==
The village is 13 km west of Kilkenny city.

Civil parishes adjoining Tullaroan parish include Ballingarry (Slieveardagh) in County Tipperary and in County Kilkenny Ballinamara, Ballycallan, Ballylarkin, Killahy (Crannagh), Kilmanagh, Tubbridbritain.

== See also ==
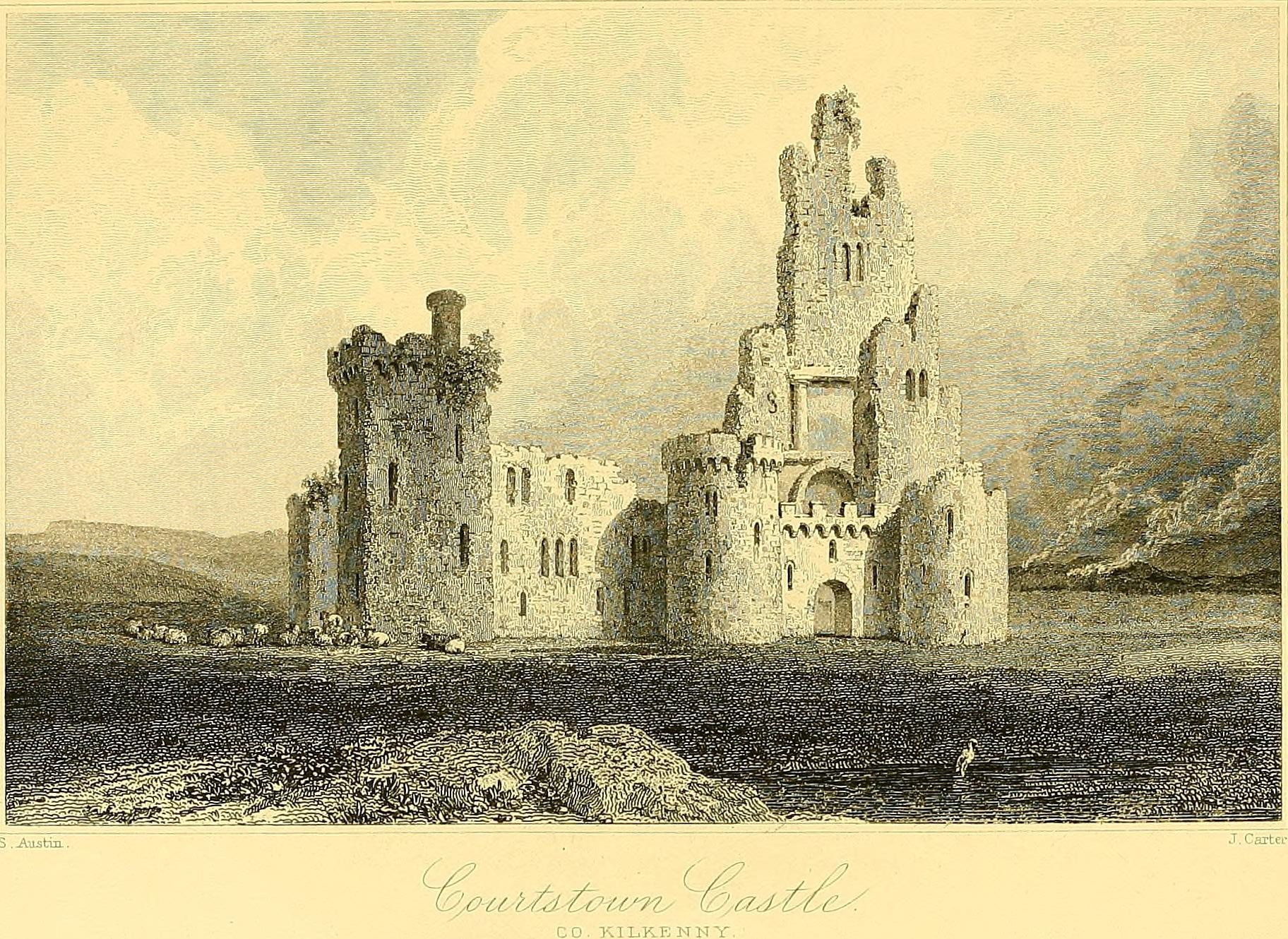
Courtstown Castle

- Tullaroan Church
