= Eoin Larkin =

Irish hurler (born 1984)

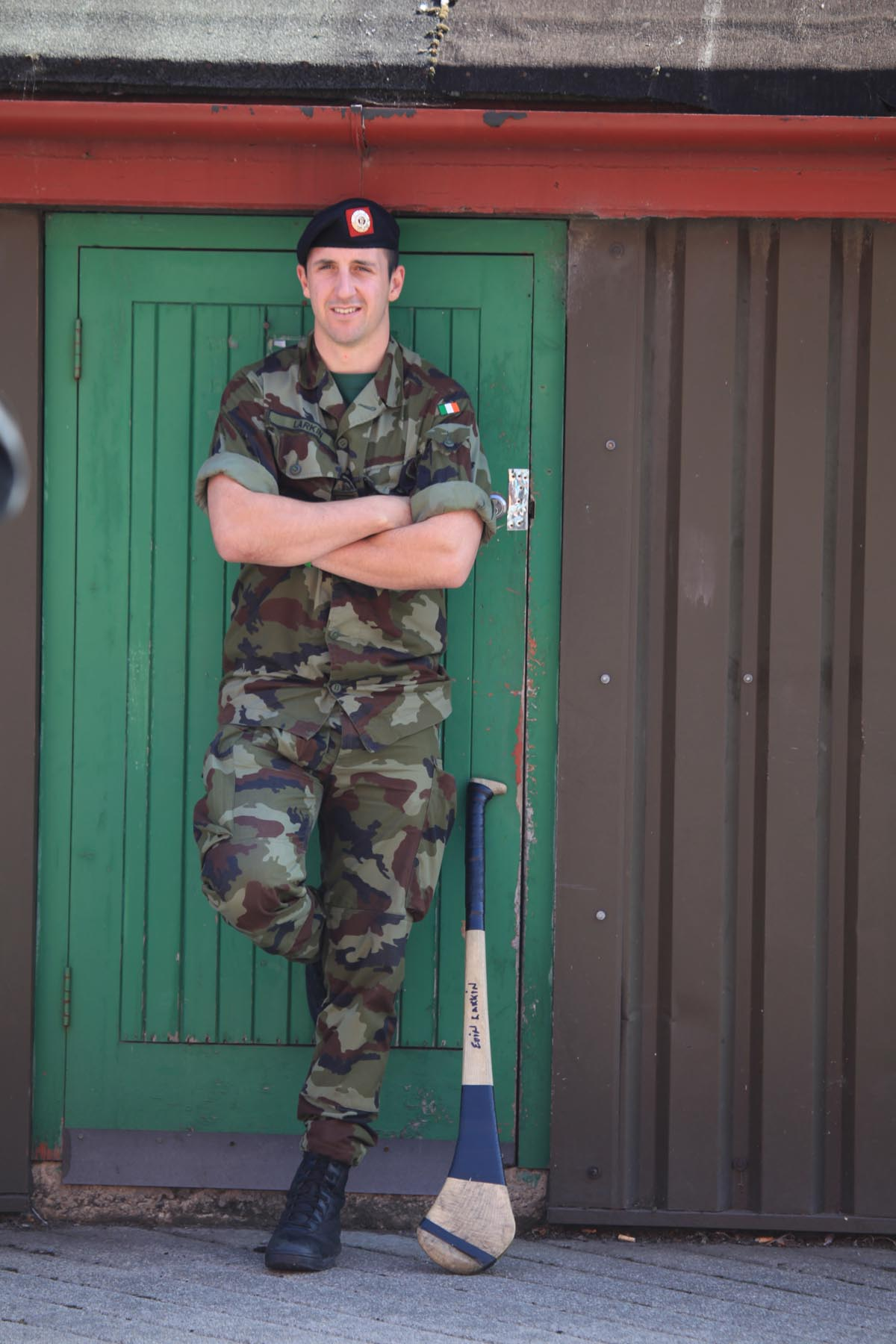

Personal information
- Native name: Eoghan Ó Lorcáin (Irish)
- Nickname: Larks
- Born: 17 July 1984 (age 42) Kilkenny, Ireland
- Occupation: Irish hurler
- Height: 6 ft 0 in (183 cm)

Sport
- Sport: Hurling
- Position: Left wing-forward
Club*
Years	Club	Apps (scores)
2002-2019	James Stephens	54 (19-267)
Club titles
	Football	Hurling
Kilkenny titles	2	3
Leinster titles		2
All-Ireland titles		1
Inter-county**
Years	County	Apps (scores)
2005–2016	Kilkenny	58 (8–134)
Inter-county titles
- Leinster titles: 10
- All-Irelands: 8
- NHL: 6
- All Stars: 2
- * club appearances and scores correct as of 17:28, 17 January 2021. **Inter County team apps and scores correct as of 15:24, 16 September 2016.

Eoin Larkin (born 17 July 1984) is an Irish hurler and coach. His league and championship career as a forward with the Kilkenny senior team spanned twelve seasons from 2005 to 2016.

Born in Kilkenny, Larkin first played competitive hurling following encouragement from his father. He attended St. Kieran's College where he began his college hurling career as goalkeeper at under-14 level. Larkin simultaneously came to prominence with the James Stephens club at juvenile and underage levels, winning two county under-21 championship medals in 2000 and 2002. He subsequently joined the James Stephens senior team and was at centre-forward when the club won the All-Ireland title in 2005. Larkin also won two Leinster medals and three county senior championship medals. As a Gaelic footballer with James Stephens he also won two county senior championship medals.

Larkin made his debut on the inter-county scene at the age of seventeen when he was picked for the Kilkenny minor panel. He was an unused substitute throughout the 2002 championship but collected a set of All-Ireland and Leinster medals as a member of the starting fifteen. Larkin later enjoyed a successful two-year tenure with the Kilkenny under-21 team, winning an All-Ireland medal in 2005 as well as back to back Leinster medals. He made his senior debut during the 2005 league. Over the course of the next twelve seasons, Larkin won eight All-Ireland medals, including a record-equalling four championships in-a-row from 2006 to 2009, followed by back-to-back triumphs in 2011 and 2012 and a final two championships in 2014 and 2015. The All-Ireland-winning captain of 2012, he was denied a ninth All-Ireland medal in September 2016 in what was his last game for Kilkenny. Larkin also won ten Leinster medals, six National Hurling League medals and was named All-Star, Texaco and GPA Hurler of the Year in 2008. He announced his retirement from inter-county hurling on 2 December 2016.

After being chosen at right wing-forward on the Leinster inter-provincial team in 2006, Larkin was a regular member of the team at various intervals until 2012. During that time he won four Railway Cup medals.

== Playing career ==
=== Club ===
After enjoying some success at underage levels, winning two under-21 championship medals, Larkin was a dual player with James Stephens in 2003. He won a championship medal as a Gaelic footballer that year, following a 2–7 to 0–6 defeat of O'Loughlin Gaels. Larkin top scored with 1–6.

Larkin added a hurling championship medal to his collection in 2004 following a 2–16 to 3–12 defeat of Young Irelands. As scorer-in-chief for the team he finished the game with 0–11, while Young Irelands D. J. Carey, with a personal tally of 3–6, sent a 64th-minute penalty over the bar. Larkin later won his first Leinster medal following a controversial 1–13 to 1–12 defeat of University College Dublin. The subsequent All-Ireland decider on 17 March 2005 pitted James Stephens against Athenry. Larkin scored the first of his nine points after just twenty seconds, to help his side to a 0–19 to 0–14 victory. He finished the championship campaign with a grand total of 3–33, as well as collecting an All-Ireland medal.

James Stephens retained the county championship in 2005, with Larkin winning a second hurling medal following a 1–18 to 2–12 defeat of Ballyhale Shamrocks. He later picked up a second Leinster medal following a second consecutive triumph over UCD.

In 2008 Tyrrell won a second county football championship medal following a 1–09 to 1–08 defeat of Erin's Own.

After a six-year gap, Larkin won a third hurling championship medal in 2011 after a thrilling draw, followed by a 1–20 to 0–15 replay defeat of Ballyhale Shamrocks.

=== Minor and under-21 ===
Larkin first played for Kilkenny in 2002 when he joined the minor side. He won a set of Leinster and All-Ireland medals as a non-playing substitute that year.

By 2004 Larkin had joined the Kilkenny under-21 team. He won his first Leinster medal that year following a 0–16 to 2–3 defeat of Wexford. The subsequent All-Ireland decider saw Kilkenny dominate Tipperary. A 3–21 to 1–6 trouncing gave Larkin, who came on as a substitute, an All-Ireland Under-21 Hurling Championship medal.

Larkin added a second Leinster medal to his collection in 2005, following a 0–17 to 1–10 defeat of Dublin. Kilkenny's bid for a third successive All-Ireland title ended in dramatic fashion as a late point from Kerril Wade handed Galway a narrow 1–15 to 1–14 victory.

=== Senior ===
==== Beginnings ====
Larkin was still a member of the under-21 team when he was added to the Kilkenny senior panel in 2005. Kilkenny were back in form that year, with Larkin winning a first National Hurling League medal following a huge 3–20 to 0–15 victory over Clare. On 12 June 2005 Larkin made his championship debut in a 6–28 to 0–15 Leinster semi-final trouncing of Offaly. "The Cats" later struggled against a wasteful Wexford side, however, a 0–22 to 1–16 victory gave Larkin a first Leinster medal. While a third successive All-Ireland showdown with Cork seemed likely, Galway defeated Kilkenny in the All-Ireland semi-final in one of the games of the decade.

==== Four-in-a-row ====
In 2006 Larkin added a second league medal to his collection following a 3–11 to 0–14 victory over Limerick. He later won his second Leinster medal following another facile 1–23 to 1–12 victory over Wexford. On 3 September 2006 Kilkenny faced a Cork team who were presented with the opportunity to become the first side in nearly thirty years to secure three successive All-Ireland championships. Like previous encounters neither side took a considerable lead, however, Kilkenny had a vital goal from Aidan Fogarty. Cork were in arrears coming into the final few minutes, however, Ben O'Connor scored a late goal for Cork. It was too little too late as the Cats denied Cork on a score line of 1–16 to 1–13. It was a first All-Ireland medal for Larkin..

Larkin collected a third Leinster medal in 2007, as Kilkenny asserted their provincial dominance and defeated Wexford by 2–24 to 1–12. On 2 September 2007 Kilkenny faced defeated Munster finalists and surprise All-Ireland semi-final winners Limerick in the championship decider. Kilkenny got off to a flying start with Eddie Brennan and Henry Shefflin scoring two goals within the first ten minutes to set the tone. Limerick launched a second-half comeback, however, "the Cats" were too powerful and cruised to a 2–19 to 1–15 victory. It was Larkin's second All-Ireland medal.

Kilkenny secured the Leinster crown again in 2008, with Larkin collecting a fourth winners' medal following a 5–21 to 0–17 drubbing of Wexford. On 8 September 2008 Kilkenny faced Waterford in the All-Ireland decider for the first time in forty-five years. In a disappointingly one-sided final, Kilkenny produced a near perfect seventy minutes as Waterford endured a nightmare afternoon. A 23-point winning margin, 3–24 from play, only two wides in the entire match and eight scorers in all with Eddie Brennan and Henry Shefflin leading the way in a 3–30 to 1–13 victory. It was Larkin's third All-Ireland medal, while he later collected a first All-Star. He also made a clean sweep of all the Hurler of the Year awards.

Larkin collected a third National League medal in 2009, as Kilkenny beat Tipperary by 2–26 to 4–17 with a thrilling extra-time victory. He later won a fifth successive Leinster medal as new challengers Dublin were bested by 2–18 to 0–18. On 6 September Kilkenny were poised to become the second team ever in the history of hurling to win four successive All-Ireland championships when they faced Tipperary in the decider. For long periods Tipp looked the likely winners, however, late goals from Henry Shefflin and substitute Martin Comerford finally killed off their efforts to secure a 2–22 to 0–23 victory. Larkin had collected his fourth All-Ireland medal, while a second successive All-Star soon followed.

==== Continued dominance ====
In 2010 Kilkenny defeated Galway in an eagerly-anticipated but ultimately disappointing provincial decider. A 1–19 to 1–12 victory gave Larkin a sixth Leinster medal. The drive for a fifth successive All-Ireland crown reached a head on 5 September 2010, when Kilkenny faced Tipperary in the All-Ireland decider. "The Cats" lost talisman Henry Shefflin due to injury, while Tipperary's Lar Corbett ran riot and scored a hat-trick of goals as Larkin's side fell to a 4–17 to 1–18 defeat.

Kilkenny's stranglehold in Leinster continued in 2011. A 4–17 to 1–15 defeat of Dublin gave "the Cats" and Larkin a record-equalling seventh successive provincial championship. Kilkenny subsequently faced Tipperary in the All-Ireland decider on 4 September 2011. Goals by Michael Fennelly and Richie Hogan in either half gave Kilkenny, who many viewed as the underdogs going into the game, a 2–17 to 1–16 victory. Larkin collected a fifth All-Ireland medal.

2012 began well for Larkin, who by now was captain of the team, when he collected a fourth National League medal following a 3–21 to 0–16 demolition of old rivals Cork. Kilkenny were later shocked by Galway in the Leinster decider, losing by 2–21 to 2–11, however, both sides subsequently met in the All-Ireland decider on 9 September 2012. Kilkenny had led going into the final stretch, however, Joe Canning struck a stoppage time equaliser to level the game at 2–13 to 0–19 and send the final to a replay for the first time since 1959. The replay took place three weeks later on 30 September 2012. Galway stunned the reigning champions with two first-half goals, however, Kilkenny's championship debutant Walter Walsh gave a man of the match performance, claiming a 1–3 haul. The 3–22 to 3–11 Kilkenny victory gave Larkin a sixth All-Ireland medal, while he also had the honour of lifting the Liam MacCarthy Cup.

Kilkenny's dominance showed no sign of abating in 2013, with Larkin winning a fifth National League medal following a 2–17 to 0–20 defeat of Tipperary in the decider.

In 2014 Larkin collected his sixth league medal, as Kilkenny secured a narrow one-point 2–25 to 1–27 extra-time victory over Tipperary. He subsequently secured an eighth Leinster medal, as a dominant Kilkenny display gave "the Cats" a 0–14 to 1–9 defeat of Dublin. On 7 September 2014 Kilkenny faced Tipperary in the All-Ireland decider. In what some consider to be the greatest game of all time, the sides were level when Tipperary were awarded a controversial free. John O'Dwyer had the chance to win the game, however, his late free drifted wide resulting in a draw. The replay on 27 September 2014 was also a close affair. Goals from brothers Richie and John Power inspired Kilkenny to a 2–17 to 2–14 victory. It was Larkin's seventh All-Ireland medal.

Larkin won a ninth Leinster medal in 2015 following a 1–25 to 2–15 defeat of Galway in the decider. It was Kilkenny's 70th provincial title. Kilkenny renewed their rivalry with Galway once again in the All-Ireland decider on 6 September 2015. The team struggled in the first half, however, a T. J. Reid goal and a dominant second half display, which limited Galway to just 1–4, saw Kilkenny power to a 1–22 to 1–18 victory. It was Larkin's eighth All-Ireland medal in ten years.

On 2 December 2016, Larkin announced his retirement from inter-county hurling.

=== Inter-provincial ===
In 2006 Larkin was at right wing-forward on the Leinster team that faced Connacht in the inter-provincial final. A disappointing contest resulted in a 1–23 to 0–17 victory for Leinster, and a first Railway Cup medal for Larkin.

After surrendering their title the following year, Leinster were back in the decider once again in 2008 with Larkin a key member of the forwards. Richie Power top-scored with nine points as Leinster secured a 1–15 to 1–12 victory. It was Larkin's second Railway Cup medal.

After a two-year hiatus and a period of uncertainty surrounding the competition, the Railway Cup returned in 2012 with Leinster facing Connacht in the decider. The game was effectively over at half time, with Leinster powering to an eventual 2–19 to 1–15 victory.

In 2014 Larkin lined out the Railway Cup decider once again. Just 150 spectators turned up to Croke Park as Leinster walloped Connacht for the third time in four finals by 1–23 to 0–16. It was Larkin's fourth Railway Cup medal.

== Coaching career ==
Larkin joined the Wicklow county hurling team as a coach under the management of Éamonn Scallan ahead of the 2021 season.

== Career statistics ==
=== Club ===
Team	Season	Kilkenny		Leinster		All-Ireland		Total	
Team	Season	Apps	Score	Apps	Score	Apps	Score	Apps	Score
James Stephens	2002-03	2	0-01	—		—		2	0-01
James Stephens	2003-04	3	1-01	—		—		3	1-01
James Stephens	2004-05	4	1-35	3	3-18	2	0-15	9	4-68
James Stephens	2005-06	3	0-25	3	2-23	1	0-04	7	2-52
James Stephens	2006-07	2	0-15	—		—		2	0-15
James Stephens	2007-08	2	1-15	—		—		2	1-15
James Stephens	2008-09	3	1-10	—		—		3	1-10
James Stephens	2009-10	3	2-11	—		—		3	2-11
James Stephens	2010-11	1	1-02	—		—		1	1-02
James Stephens	2011-12	4	3-33	1	0-11	—		5	3-44
James Stephens	2012-13	2	1-19	—		—		2	1-19
James Stephens	2013-14	1	0-14	—		—		1	0-14
James Stephens	2014-15	1	0-10	—		—		1	0-10
James Stephens	2015-16	0	0-00	—		—		0	0-00
James Stephens	2016-17	2	0-02	—		—		2	0-02
James Stephens	2017-19	5	3-03	—		—		5	3-03
James Stephens	2018-19	2	0-02	—		—		2	0-02
James Stephens	2019-20	4	0-00	—		—		4	0-00
Total		44	14-198	7	5-52	3	0-19	54	19-267

=== Inter-county ===
Team	Year	Division	Walsh Cup		National League		Leinster		All-Ireland		Total	
Team	Year	Division	Apps	Score	Apps	Score	Apps	Score	Apps	Score	Apps	Score
Kilkenny	2005	Division 1A	0	0-00	5	3-27	2	0-03	2	0-01	9	3-31
Kilkenny	2006	Division 1B	0	0-00	6	1-15	2	0-00	3	0-06	11	1-21
Kilkenny	2007	Division 1B	2	2-06	6	0-11	2	1-02	3	0-08	13	3-27
Kilkenny	2008	Division 1A	0	0-00	0	0-00	2	0-07	2	2-06	4	2-13
Kilkenny	2009	Division 1	0	0-00	6	2-09	2	0-07	2	0-05	10	2-21
Kilkenny	2010	Division 1	0	0-00	5	1-04	2	0-01	2	0-01	9	1-06
Kilkenny	2011	Division 1	1	0-01	5	0-04	2	1-03	2	0-04	10	1-12
Kilkenny	2012	Division 1A	1	1-01	7	3-20	2	0-02	4	1-04	14	5-27
Kilkenny	2013	Division 1A	0	0-00	7	0-37	3	0-29	3	0-21	13	0-87
Kilkenny	2014	Division 1A	2	0-12	6	1-07	4	3-06	3	0-04	15	4-29
Kilkenny	2015	Division 1A	0	0-00	0	0-00	2	0-07	2	0-03	4	0-10
Kilkenny	2016	Division 1A	0	0-00	0	0-00	2	0-00	3	0-04	5	0-04
Total			6	3-20	53	11-134	27	5-67	31	3-67	117	22-288

== Honours ==
=== Team ===
James Stephens

- All-Ireland Senior Club Hurling Championship (1): 2005
- Leinster Senior Club Hurling Championship (2): 2004, 2005
- Kilkenny Senior Hurling Championship (3): 2004, 2005, 2011
- Kilkenny Senior Football Championship (2): 2003, 2008
- Kilkenny Under-21 Club Hurling Championship (2): 2000, 2002
- Kilkenny Junior 'B' Club Hurling Championship (1): 2026

Kilkenny

- All-Ireland Senior Hurling Championship (8): 2006, 2007, 2008, 2009, 2011, 2012, 2014, 2015
- Leinster Senior Hurling Championship (10): 2005, 2006, 2007, 2008, 2009, 2010, 2011, 2014, 2015, 2016
- National Hurling League (6): 2005, 2006, 2009, 2012 (c), 2013, 2014
- Walsh Cup (3): 2007, 2012 (c), 2014
- All-Ireland Under-21 Hurling Championship (1): 2004
- Leinster Under-21 Hurling Championship (1): 2004, 2005
- All-Ireland Minor Hurling Championship (1): 2002
- Leinster Minor Hurling Championship (1): 2002

Leinster

- Interprovincial Championship (2): 2008, 2009

=== Individual ===
Awards

- GPA Hurler of the Year (1): 2008
- Texaco Hurler of the Year (1): 2008
- All Stars Hurler of the Year (1): 2008
- All Stars (2): 2008, 2009
- GPA Gaelic Team of the Year (2): 2008, 2009

Awards
Preceded by Dan Shanahan (Waterford)	Vodafone Hurler of the Year; 2008	Succeeded by Tommy Walsh (Kilkenny)
Preceded by Dan Shanahan (Waterford)	Texaco Hurler of the Year; 2008	Succeeded by Tommy Walsh (Kilkenny)
Preceded by Dan Shanahan (Waterford)	Gaelic Players' Association; Hurler of the Year; 2008	Succeeded by Tommy Walsh (Kilkenny)
Sporting positions
Preceded by Brian Hogan	Kilkenny Senior Hurling Captain; 2012	Succeeded by Colin Fennelly
Achievements
Preceded by Brian Hogan (Kilkenny)	All-Ireland Senior Hurling Final winning captain 2012	Succeeded by Patrick Donnellan (Clare)
