= 2005–06 All-Ireland Senior Club Hurling Championship =

All-Ireland Senior Club Hurling Championship 2005–06
Championship Details
- Dates: 15 October 2005 – 17 March 2006
- Teams: 26

All Ireland Champions
- Winners: Portumna (1st win)
- Captain: Eugene McEntee
- Manager: Jimmy Heverin

All Ireland Runners-up
- Runners-up: Newtownshandrum
- Captain: Brendan Mulcahy
- Manager: Bernie O'Connor

Provincial Champions
- Munster: Newtownshandrum
- Leinster: James Stephens
- Ulster: Ballygalget
- Connacht: Portumna

Championship Statistics
- Matches Played: 25
- Total Goals: 71 (2.84 per game)
- Total Points: 598 (23.92 per game)
- Top Scorer: Eoin Larkin (2–27)

The 2005–06 All-Ireland Senior Club Hurling Championship was the 36th staging of the All-Ireland Senior Club Hurling Championship, the Gaelic Athletic Association's premier inter-county club hurling tournament. The championship ran from 15 October 2005 to 17 March 2006.

James Stephens of Kilkenny were the defending champions, however, they were beaten by Portumna in the All-Ireland semi-final. Calry/St Joseph's of Sligo, Celbridge of Kildare and Garryspillane of Limerick made their championship debuts.

The All-Ireland final was played at Croke Park in Dublin on 17 March 2006, between Portumna of Galway and Newtownshandrum of Cork, in what was a first championship meeting between the teams. Portumna won the match by 2–08 to 1–06 to claim a first title.

Eoin Larkin was the championship's top scorer with 2–27.

== Connacht Senior Club Hurling Championship ==
=== Connacht quarter-finals ===
15 October 2005 Quarter-final	Ballyhaunis	1–10 – 2–15	Four Roads	Fr O'Hara Park
	K Higgins 0–6, D McConn 1–0, C McCrudden 0–2, L Lyons 0–1, P McConn 0–1.		J Mannion 1–3, B Mannion 1–2, K Waldron 0–2, R Kennedy 0–2, T Kelly 0–2, J Moran 0–1, M Kelly 0–1, M Mulry 0–1, T Lennon 0–1.

22 October 2005 Quarter-final	St Mary's Kiltoghert	1–17 – 2–10	Calry/St Joseph's	Páirc Seán Mac Diarmada
	C Cunniffe 1–10, B Carroll 0–2, D Regan 0–2, D O'Grady 0–1, V McDermott 0–1, M Coles 0–1.		K Raymond 1–4, M Shelley 0–5, J Galvin 1–0, S Boyd 0–1.

=== Connacht semi-final ===
30 October 2005 Semi-final	St Mary's Kiltoghert	0–05 – 1–09	Four Roads	Páirc Seán Mac Diarmada
	C Cunniffe 0–4, M Coles 0–1.	Report	R Mulry 1–2, J Mannion 0–4, P Tiernan, K Waldron, M Kelly 0–1 each.	Referee: G Kilbride (Mayo)

=== Connacht final ===
20 November 2005 Final	Four Roads	0–06 – 2–22	Portumna	Athleague GAA Grounds
	R Mulry (0–3, frees), J Mannion (0–3, frees).	Report	J Canning (1–9, 0–7 frees), N Hayes (1–1), D Hayes (0–4), K Hayes (0–3), D Canning (0–3), A Smith (0–1, free), L Smith (0–1).	Referee: J Weldon (Westmeath)

== Leinster Senior Club Hurling Championship ==
=== Leinster first round ===
30 October 2005 First round	University College Dublin	3–25 – 1–03	Killyon	Parnell Park
	P Morrissey 0–7 (5f); R Barry 1–3 (1f); B Murphy 0–5 (1f); J O'Connor 1–2; M Doherty 1–0; T Fitzgerald 0–3; E O'Gorman, C Everard 0–2 each; B Phelan 0–1.	Report	D Ryan 1–1; P McKeown, J Mitchell 0–1 each.	Referee: J Kelly (Wexford)

30 October 2005 First round	Castlepollard	1–10 – 2–14	Glenealy	Castletown Geoghegan GAA Grounds
	A Devine 1–4, B Kennedy 0–3, K Brazil, S Egan and B Devine 0–1 each.	Report	J O'Neill 1–7, W O'Gorman 1–0, L Glynn, A Driver, N Driver 0–2 each, D Doyle 0–1.	Referee: F Smith (Meath)

31 October 2005 First round	Knockbridge	1–14 – 1–05	Clonguish	Páirc an Chuinnigh
	S Byrne 0–8 (4f, 1'65'), T Hilliard 0–3 E Quigley 1–0, D Dunne 0–2, P Mone 0–1.	Report	J O'Brien 0–5 (4f), C Finnucane 1–0.

6 November 2005 First round	Celbridge	0–12 – 3–14	Naomh Eoin	Radley Park
	M Moloney 0–4, B White (2f) and M Dowd (all f) 0–3 each, C Doyle and T Murphy 0–1 each.	Report	D Roberts 0–7 (6f), K Foley 2–1, R Foley 1–0, K Nolan and S Smithers (1f) 0–2 each, B Murphy and J Waters 0–1 each.	Referee: J Owens (Wexford)

=== Leinster quarter-finals ===
5 November 2005 Quarter-final	Glenealy	2–10 – 2–16	Castletown	Pearse Park
	J O'Neill (0–9, two from play), W O'Gorman (1–1), E Glynn (1–0).	Report	D Cuddy (0–6), J Hooban (1–2), P Cuddy (0–4, frees), J Palmer (1–0), F Sullivan (0–2), R Delaney (0–1), C Cuddy (0–1).	Referee: J Guinan (Kilkenny)

6 November 2005 Quarter-final	Knockbridge	0–09 – 6–21	Oulart-the Ballagh	Páirc an Chuinnigh
	S Byrne 0–5 (4f), R Byrne, P Dunne, C O hUallachain, D Dunne 0–1 each.	Report	D Mythen 3–3, R Jacob 1–4, S Doyle 0–6 (2f), A O'Leary 2–0, P Redmond, W Whelan, M Storey 0–2 each, M Jacob, N Kirwan 0–1 each.	Referee: J McGrath (Westmeath)

13 November 2005 Quarter-final	Naomh Eoin	1–13 – 1–16	James Stephens	Dr Cullen Park
	B "Red" Murphy (1–3, 0–1 free), D Roberts (0–4, all frees), B "Black" Murphy (0–3), K Foley (0–1), J Waters (0–1), S Smithers (0–1).	Report	E Larkin (1–6, 0–4 frees, 0–1 65), J Murray (0–2), S Egan (0–2), P O'Brien (0–2), B McEvoy (0–1), G Whelan (0–1), E McCormack (0–1), R Hayes (0–1).	Referee: J Kelly (Wexford)

13 November 2005 Quarter-final	University College Dublin	1–12 – 1–07	Birr	Parnell Park
	P Morrissey 0–6 (3f, 1 pen), T Fitzgerald 1–0, B Barry 0–3 (3f), S Lucey 0–2, D Fitzgerald 0–1.	Report	M Dwayne 1–1, S Whelahan 0–3 (2f), D Hayden 0–2, Brian Whelahan 0–1 ('65').	Referee: A Stapleton (Laois)

=== Leinster semi-finals ===
20 November 2005 Semi-final	University College Dublin	0–15 – 1–09	Oulart-the Ballagh	Nowlan Park
	P Morrissey 0–4 (3-f), B Phelan, E O'Gorman 0–3 each, T Fitzgerald 0–2, B Barry, S Lucey 0–1 each.	Report	S Doyle 1–3 (0-3f), D Mythen, R Jacob 0–2 each, M Jacob, W Whelan 0–1 each.	Referee: D Connolly (Kilkenny)

20 November 2005 Semi-final	James Stephens	5–14 – 0–08	Castletown	Dr Cullen Park
	E Larkin (1–9, 0–5 frees, 0–1 65), R Hayes (2–0), E McCormack (1–1), J Whelan (1–1), P O'Brien (0–2), J Tyrrell (0–1).	Report	Paul Cuddy (0–4, frees), D Cuddy (0–3, one free, one 65), G Reddin (0–1).	Referee: D Murphy (Wexford)

=== Leinster final ===
27 November 2005 Final	James Stephens	2–13 – 1–12	University College Dublin	O'Moore Park
	E Larkin 0–8 (6f, 1 65), S Egan, M Ruth 1–0 each, B McEvoy (1f, 1 65), D McCormack 0–2 each, P O'Brien 0–1.	Report	P Morrissey (3f), B Barry (1f, 1 lineball, 1 65), C Everard 0–3 each; J O'Connor 1–0, S Lucey 0–2, T Fitzgerald 0–1.	Referee: B Gavin (Offaly)

== Munster Senior Club Hurling Championship ==
=== Munster quarter-finals ===
6 November 2005 Quarter-final	Thurles Sarsfields	2–15 – 3–08	Lixnaw	Semple Stadium
	J Enright 0–5, L Corbett 1–2, G O Grady 1–1, W Culley 0–2, J Corbett, S Ryan, R Ruth, S Mason, P Burke 0–1 each.	Report	M Conway 3–7, P Galvin 0–1.	Referee: P O'Connor (Limerick)

6 November 2005 Quarter-final	Garryspillane	1–11 – 2–12	Ballygunner	Gaelic Grounds
	F Carroll 1–5 (0-3f), Davy Ryan 0–3 (3f), P Tobin, Donie Ryan, TJ Ryan (f) 0–1 each.	Report	P Flynn 2–4 (1-2f), T Power 0–4 (2f 1'65'), B O'Sullivan, G O'Connor, A Moloney, S Walsh 0–1 each.	Referee: S Roche (Tipperary)

=== Munster semi-finals ===
20 November 2005 Semi-final	Newtownshandrum	1–16 – 0–13	Thurles Sarsfields	Páirc Uí Chaoimh
	B O'Connor (0–8, four frees), Jerry O'Connor (1–1), John O'Connor (0–2), C Naughton (0–2), JP King (0–2), J Bowles (0–1).	Report	G O'Grady (0–4, one free), J Enright (0–4 frees), E Enright (0–2), S Lillis (0–1), P Burke (0–1), P Lawlor (0–1).	Referee: M Wadding (Waterford)

20 November 2005 Semi-final	Ballygunner	3–13 – 2–09	Clarecastle	Walsh Park
	P Flynn (2–3, one goal and two points from frees), S O'Sullivan (1–1), P Foley (0–4), G O'Connor (0–2), A Kirwan (0–1), A Moloney (0–1), S Walsh (0–1).	Report	T Kearse (1–1), D Quinn (0–4, two frees), S Moloney (1–0), J Clancy (0–2), J Pyne (0–1), S Sheedy (0–1),	Referee: D Kirwan (Cork)

=== Munster final ===
4 December 2005 Final	Newtownshandrum	0–16 – 1–12	Ballygunner	Semple Stadium
	B O'Connor (0–6, three frees, two sidelines), C Naughton (0–3), John O'Connor (0–3), JP King (0–2), Jerry O'Connor (0–1), J Bowles (0–1).	Report	G O'Connor (1–1), P Flynn (0–4, one 65, two frees), A Moloney (0–3), C Kehoe (0–2), F Hartley (0–1), S O'Sullivan (0–1).	Referee: A Heagney (Clare)

== Ulster Senior Club Hurling Championship ==
=== Ulster semi-final ===
16 October 2005 Semi-final	Ruairí Óg, Cushendall	2–08 – 0–07	Banagher	Casement Park
	A Delargy 1-2, E McKillop 1-0, C McCambridge 0-2, N McManus 0-1, K McKeegan 0-1, C McKeegan 0-1, M McClafferty 0-1.		Gary Biggs 0-2, M Lynch 0-2, Gregory Biggs 0-2, K Stevenson 0-1.

=== Ulster final ===
30 October 2005 Final	Ruairí Óg, Cushendall	3–08 – 1–18	Ballygalget	Casement Park
	C McCambridge 1–5, 0-3f, E McKillop, J Carson 1–0 each, A Delargy 0-2f, P McGill 0–1.	Report	J McGratten 1–8, 0-8f, S Clarke 0–3, E Clarke, P Monan 0–2 each, G Clarke, B Coulter, G Johnston 0–1 each.	Referee: S O'Rourke (Monaghan)

== All-Ireland Senior Club Hurling Championship ==
=== All-Ireland semi-finals ===
12 February 2006 Semi-final	Portumna	2–17 – 0–11	James Stephens	Semple Stadium
	J Canning (1–7, five points frees and one sideline), D Hayes (1–4), A Smith (0–4), D Canning (0–1), N Hayes (0–1).	Report	E Larkin (0–4, three frees), B McEvoy (0–3, one free), E McCormack (0–2), D McCormack (0–2).	Referee: S Roche (Tipperary)

12 February 2006 Semi-final	Newtownshandrum	0–14 – 1–10	Ballygalget	O'Moore Park
	B O'Connor 0–10; J O'Connor, M Farrell, B Naughton, J O'Mahoney 0–1 each.	Report	J McGrattan 0–5; E Clarke 1–0; S Clarke 0–2; B Coulter, M Coulter, P Monan 0–1 each.	Referee: B Gavin (Offaly)

=== All-Ireland final ===
17 March 2006 Final	Portumna	2–08 – 1–06	Newtownshandrum	Croke Park
	J Canning 1–6 (0-6f), N Hayes 1–0, D Hayes 0–1, L Smith 0–1.	Report	B O'Connor 0–4 (0-3f), J O'Connor 1–0, C Naughton 0–2.	Referee: B Gavin (Offaly)

== Championship statistics ==
=== Top scorers ===
Rank	Player	County	Tally	Total	Matches	Average
1	Eoin Larkin	James Stephens	2–27	33	4	8.25
2	Joe Canning	Portumna	3–22	31	3	10.33
3	Ben O'Connor	Newtownshandrum	0–28	28	4	7.00
4	Paul Flynn	Ballygunner	4–11	23	3	7.66
5	Pa Morrissey	University College Dublin	0–20	20	4	5.00
6	Jonathan O'Neill	Glenealy	1–16	19	2	9.50
7	Clement Cunniffe	St. Mary's Kiltoghert	1–14	17	2	8.50
8	Mike Conway	Lixnaw	3–07	16	1	16.00
8	Johnny McGrattan	Ballygalget	1–13	16	2	8.00
10	Des Mythen	Oulart-the Ballagh	3–05	14	2	7.00
