= Hurler of the Year =

Hurler of the Year can refer to the following.

- Texaco Hurler of the Year
- All Stars Hurler of the Year
- GPA Hurler of the Year
