= J. J. Delaney =

Kilkenny hurler

Personal information
- Native name: S. S. Ó Dúláinne (Irish)
- Born: 6 March 1982 (age 44) Waterford, Ireland
- Occupation: Sales rep
- Height: 5 ft 11 in (180 cm)

Sport
- Sport: Hurling
- Position: Left wing-back, Full-back
Club
- Years: Club
- Fenians
Club titles
- Kilkenny titles: 0
College
- Years: College
- Waterford Institute of Technology
College titles
- Fitzgibbon titles: 2
Inter-county*
Years	County	Apps (scores)
2001–2014	Kilkenny	66 (0–1)
Inter-county titles
- Leinster titles: 11
- All-Irelands: 9
- NHL: 8
- All Stars: 7
- *Inter County team apps and scores correct as of 14:01, 17 April 2016.

James John Delaney (born 6 March 1982) is an Irish hurler who played as a left wing-back and full-back at senior level for the Kilkenny county team.

Born in Waterford in 1982, Delaney is a native of Johnstown, County Kilkenny. Delaney first played competitive hurling during his schooling at Coláiste Mhuire. He arrived on the inter-county scene at the age of seventeen when he first linked up with the Kilkenny minor team, before later joining the under-21 side. He made his senior debut during the 2001 championship. Delaney immediately became a regular member of the starting fifteen, and won nine All-Ireland medals, eleven Leinster medals and eight National League medals on the field of play. He was an All-Ireland runner-up on two occasions.

As a member of the Leinster inter-provincial team on a number of occasions, Delaney won two Railway Cup medals. At club level Delaney continues to play with Fenians.

Delaney's uncles, Billy Fitzpatrick and Pat Delaney, won nine All-Ireland medals between them between 1969 and 1983, while his father, Shem Delaney, shared in one of these All-Ireland successes as a non-playing substitute. His first cousin, P. J. Delaney, won an All-Ireland medal in 1993.

Throughout his career Delaney made 66 championship appearances, setting him out as the third most "capped" player of all time. He announced his retirement from inter-county hurling on 5 December 2014.

A 2014 article in the Irish Times describe Delaney as "one of the best fullbacks the game has seen". In 2003 he won the first of six All-Star awards, while he also made a clean sweep of all the top individual awards, winning the All-Star, Texaco and GPA Hurler of the Year awards. Delaney was also chosen as one of the 125 greatest hurlers of all time in a 2009 poll. That same year he was chosen on the Leinster team of the past twenty-five years.

== Playing career ==
=== University ===
During his studies at the Waterford Institute of Technology, Delaney was an automatic inclusion on the college hurling team. After losing the decider in 2002, his side were back the following year and faced Cork Institute of Technology in the final. A 0–13 to 1–7 victory gave Delaney his first Fitzgibbon Cup medal.

In 2004 Waterford IT reached a third successive final where they faced University College Cork. Against the wind, Waterford rallied with late scores to overhaul Cork, with a last minute free from Wexford senior Rory Jacob being the clinching score in an 0–11 to 0–9 victory for Delaney'e side.

=== Club ===
Delaney plays his club hurling with the Fenians club in Johnstown. He has enjoyed some success with the club at underage levels, beginning with an under-16 north county club medal. Delaney later won both an under-21 north county club medal and an under-21 county medal. He won his first adult county medal after the Fenians defeated Piltown by 1–14 to 1–12 in the Kilkenny Junior 'C' Hurling Championship final in 2021 at the age of 39 playing in the center back position.

=== Minor and under-21 ===
Delaney first played for Kilkenny in 1999 when he joined the minor side. He won his sole Leinster medal that year following a 2–13 to 1–11 defeat of Wexford.

By 2003 Delaney was a key member of the Kilkenny under-21 team. He won a Leinster medal that year following a 0–12 to 1–4 defeat of Dublin. Kilkenny later faced Galway in the All-Ireland decider. "The Cats" outsmarted a Galway side which struggled in attack and conceded a goal a minute into the second half. The 2–13 to 0–12 score line gave Delaney an All-Ireland Under-21 Hurling Championship medal.

=== Senior ===
==== Early successes ====
Delaney was just out of the minor grade when he was added to the Kilkenny senior panel in 2001. That year he won his first Leinster medal following a 2–19 to 0–12 trouncing of Wexford.

Kilkenny bounced back in 2002. Delaney won his first National League medal, as a late Brian Dowling free secured a narrow 2–15 to 2–14 victory. He later collected a second Leinster medal as Kilkenny recorded a narrow 0–19 to 0–17 defeat of fourteen-man Wexford. On 8 September 2002 Delaney lined out in his first All-Ireland decider as Kilkenny faced first-round losers Clare. Kilkenny forwards Henry Shefflin and D. J. Carey combined to score 2–13 between them, as Kilkenny secured a 2–20 to 0–19 victory. It was Delaney's first All-Ireland medal for Kilkenny.

In 2003 Delaney won a second league medal as Kilkenny came back from eight points down to secure a stunning 5–14 to 5–13 extra-time defeat of Tipperary. He later won a third successive Leinster medal, as Kilkenny defeated Wexford by 2–23 to 2–12. The subsequent All-Ireland final on 14 September 2003 saw Kilkenny face Cork for the first time in four years. Both teams remained level for much of the game, exchanging tit-for-tat scores. A Setanta Ó hAilpín goal gave Cork the advantage, however, a Martin Comerford goal five minutes from the end settled the game as Kilkenny went on to win by 1–14 to 1–11. It was Delaney's second All-Ireland medal on the field of play. He was later honoured with his first All-Star award before making a clean sweep of the three Hurler of the Year awards.

After facing a shock, last-minute 2–15 to 1–16 defeat by Wexford in the Leinster semi-final in 2004, Kilkenny worked their way through the qualifiers and lined out against Cork in the All-Ireland decider on 12 September 2004. The game was expected to be a classic, however, a rain-soaked day made conditions difficult as Kilkenny aimed to secure a third successive championship. The first half was a low-scoring affair and provided little excitement for fans, however, the second half saw Cork completely take over. For the last twenty-three minutes Cork scored nine unanswered points and went on to win the game by 0–17 to 0–9. Kilkenny ended the year with no silverware, however, Delaney was still presented with a second consecutive All-Star award.

Kilkenny were back in form in 2005, with Delaney winning a third National League medal following a 3–20 to 0–15 victory over Clare. "The Cats" later struggled against a wasteful Wexford side, however, a 0–22 to 1–16 victory gave Delaney a fourth Leinster medal. While a third successive All-Ireland showdown with Cork seemed likely, Galway defeated Kilkenny in the All-Ireland semi-final in one of the games of the decade.

==== Four-in-a-row ====
In 2006 Delaney added a fourth National League medal to his collection following a 3–11 to 0–14 victory over Limerick. He later won his fifth Leinster medal following another facile 1–23 to 1–12 victory over Wexford. With an All-Ireland showdown with Cork beckoning, Delaney damaged the cruciate ligament in his left knee which ruled him out of the game which Kilkenny won by 1–16 to 1–13. In spite of missing the decider, Delaney rounded off the year once again by claiming a third All-Star award.

Initial concerns that Delaney would be absent for most of 2007 proved unfounded, as surgery revealed that 75% of the ligament remained undamaged and intact. He returned to full training early in January of that year and made his return to the Kilkenny side during the league campaign. Delaney collected a sixth Leinster medal in 2007, as Kilkenny asserted their provincial dominance and defeated Wexford by 2–24 to 1–12. On 2 September 2007 Kilkenny faced defeated Munster finalists and surprise All-Ireland semi-final winners Limerick in the championship decider. Kilkenny got off to a flying start with Eddie Brennan and Henry Shefflin scoring two goals within the first ten minutes to set the tone. Limerick launched a second-half comeback, however, "the Cats" were too powerful and cruised to a 2–19 to 1–15 victory. It was Delaney's third All-Ireland medal.

Kilkenny secured the Leinster crown again in 2008, with Delaney collecting a seventh winners' medal following a 5–21 to 0–17 drubbing of Wexford. On 8 September 2008 Kilkenny faced Waterford in the All-Ireland decider for the first time in forty-five years. In a disappointingly one-sided final, Kilkenny produced a near perfect seventy minutes as Waterford endured a nightmare afternoon. A 23-point winning margin, 3–24 from play, only two wides in the entire match and eight scorers in all with Eddie Brennan and Henry Shefflin leading the way in a 3–30 to 1–13 victory. It was Delaney's fourth All-Ireland medal, while a fourth All-Star quickly followed.

Delaney collected a fifth National League medal in 2009, as Kilkenny beat Tipperary by 2–26 to 4–17 with a thrilling extra-time victory. He later won a fifth successive Leinster medal, his eighth overall, as new challengers Dublin were bested by 2–18 to 0–18. On 6 September Kilkenny were poised to become the second team ever in the history of hurling to win four successive All-Ireland championships when they faced Tipperary in the decider. For long periods Tipp looked the likely winners, however, late goals from Henry Shefflin and substitute Martin Comerford finally killed off their efforts to secure a 2–22 to 0–23 victory. Delaney had collected his fifth All-Ireland medal.

==== Continued dominance ====
In 2010 Kilkenny defeated Galway in an eagerly-anticipated but ultimately disappointing provincial decider. A 1–19 to 1–12 victory gave Delaney a ninth Leinster medal. The drive for a fifth successive All-Ireland crown reached a head on 5 September 2010, when Kilkenny faced Tipperary in the All-Ireland decider. "The Cats" lost talisman Henry Shefflin due to injury, while Tipperary's Lar Corbett ran riot and scored a hat-trick of goals as Delaney's side fell to a 4–17 to 1–18 defeat. In spite of this defeat, Delaney later won a fifth All-Star award.

Kilkenny's stranglehold in Leinster continued in 2011. A 4–17 to 1–15 defeat of Dublin gave "the Cats" a record-equalling seventh successive championship. It was Delaney's tenth winners' medal overall. Kilkenny subsequently faced Tipperary in the All-Ireland decider on 4 September 2011. Goals by Michael Fennelly and Richie Hogan in either half gave Kilkenny, who many viewed as the underdogs going into the game, a 2–17 to 1–16 victory. Delaney collected a sixth All-Ireland medal.

2012 began well for Delaney when he collected a sixth National League medal following a 3–21 to 0–16 demolition of old rivals Cork. Kilkenny were later shocked by Galway in the Leinster decider, losing by 2–21 to 2–11, however, both sides subsequently met in the All-Ireland decider on 9 September 2012. Kilkenny had led going into the final stretch, however, Joe Canning struck a stoppage time equaliser to level the game at 2–13 to 0–19 and send the final to a replay for the first time since 1959. The replay took place three weeks later on 30 September 2012. Galway stunned the reigning champions with two first-half goals, however, Kilkenny's championship debutant Walter Walsh gave a man of the match performance, claiming a 1–3 haul. The 3–22 to 3–11 Kilkenny victory gave Delaney a seventh All-Ireland medal. He later collected a sixth All-Star.

==== Twilight successes ====
Kilkenny's dominance showed no sign of abating in 2013, with Delaney winning a seventh National League medal following a 2–17 to 0–20 defeat of Tipperary in the decider.

In 2014 Delaney deputised as captain on a number of occasions due to the absence of regular skipper Lester Ryan. That year he collected his eighth league medal, as Kilkenny secured a narrow one-point 2–25 to 1–27 extra-time victory over Tipperary. Delaney subsequently secured an eleventh Leinster medal, as a dominant Kilkenny display gave "the Cats" a 0–14 to 1–9 defeat of Dublin. On 7 September 2014, Delaney led Kilkenny onto the field for an All-Ireland decider with Tipperary. In what some consider to be the greatest game of all time, the sides were level when Tipperary were awarded a controversial free. John O'Dwyer had the chance to win the game, however, his late free drifted wide resulting in a draw. The replay on 27 September 2014 was also a close affair, with Delaney's hook on Séamus Callanan being a high point. Goals from brothers Richie and John Power inspired Kilkenny to a 2–17 to 2–14 victory. It was Delaney's eighth All-Ireland medal, while a seventh All-Star award quickly followed.

Delaney announced his retirement from inter-county hurling on 5 December 2014.

=== Inter-provincial ===
In 2002 Delaney was at centre-back as the Leinster inter-provincial team faced their age-old rivals Munster in the championship decider. A last-minute free by Henry Shefflin secured a 4–15 to 3–17 victory and a first Railway Cup medal for Delaney.

Delaney added a second winners' medal to his collection in 2009, as Leinster defeated Connacht by 3–18 to 1–17.

== Retirement ==
After winning a 9th winners' medal in 2014 J.J. Delaney retired from intercounty hurling in December of that year. If he had remained on the Kilkenny Senior Hurling panel in 2015 he would possibly have equalled Henry Shefflin's record of winning 10 All-Ireland medals.

He has since worked as an analyst for Sky Sports.

== Honours ==
=== Player ===
Fenians

- Kilkenny Junior 'C' Hurling Championship (1): 2021

Waterford Institute of Technology

- Fitzgibbon Cup (2): 2003, 2004

Kilkenny

- All-Ireland Senior Hurling Championship (9): 2002, 2003, 2006, 2007, 2008, 2009, 2011, 2012, 2014
- Leinster Senior Hurling Championship (11): 2001, 2002, 2003, 2005, 2006, 2007, 2008, 2009, 2010, 2011, 2014
- National Hurling League (8): 2002, 2003, 2005, 2006, 2009, 2012, 2013, 2014
- Walsh Cup (6): 2005, 2006, 2007, 2009, 2012, 2014
- All-Ireland Under-21 Hurling Championship (1): 2003
- Leinster Under-21 Hurling Championship (1): 2003
- Leinster Minor Hurling Championship (1): 1999

Leinster

- Railway Cup (2): 2002, 2009

=== Individual ===
Awards

- Leinster Hurling Team of the Last 25 Years (1984–2009): Left wing-back
- The 125 greatest stars of the GAA: No. 32
- Texaco Hurler of the Year (1): 2003
- All Stars Hurler of the Year (1): 2003
- GPA Hurler of the Year (1): 2003
- All-Stars (7): 2003, 2004, 2006, 2008, 2010, 2012, 2014
- In May 2020, the Irish Independent named Delaney at number thirteen in its "Top 20 hurlers in Ireland over the past 50 years".

Awards
Preceded by Henry Shefflin (Kilkenny)	Vodafone Hurler of the Year; 2003	Succeeded by Seán Óg Ó hAilpín (Cork)
Preceded by Henry Shefflin (Kilkenny)	Texaco Hurler of the Year; 2003	Succeeded by Seán Óg Ó hAilpín (Cork)
Preceded by Henry Shefflin (Kilkenny)	Gaelic Players' Association; Hurler of the Year; 2003	Succeeded by Seán Óg Ó hAilpín (Cork)
Preceded by Lar Corbett (Tipperary)	All-Ireland SHC Final; Man of the Match; 2011	Succeeded by Iarla Tannian (Galway)
