= Henry Shefflin =

Kilkenny hurler (born 1979)

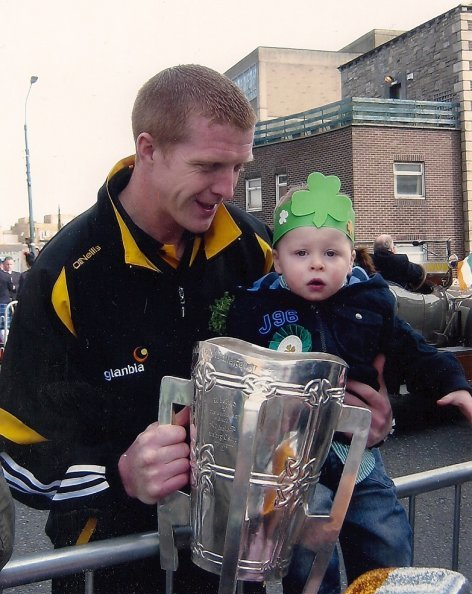
- Shefflin in 2009

Personal information
- Native name: Anraí Ó Sibhleáin (Irish)
- Nicknames: King Henry, Sheff
- Born: 11 January 1979 (age 47) Ballyhale, County Kilkenny, Ireland
- Occupation: Bank official
- Height: 6 ft 2 in (188 cm)

Sport
- Sport: Hurling
- Position: Centre-forward
Club*
Years	Club	Apps (scores)
1997–2017	Ballyhale Shamrocks	66 (16–406)
Club titles
- Kilkenny titles: 6
- Leinster titles: 4
- All-Ireland Titles: 3
College
- Years: College
- 1997–2002: Waterford IT
College titles
- Fitzgibbon titles: 2
Inter-county**
Years	County	Apps (scores)
1999–2015	Kilkenny	71 (27–484)
Inter-county titles
- Leinster titles: 13
- All-Irelands: 10
- NHL: 6
- All Stars: 11
- * club appearances and scores correct as of 15:22, 21 March 2015 (UTC). **Inter County team apps and scores correct as of 15:22, 1 June 2018 (UTC).

Henry Shefflin (born 11 January 1979) is an Irish hurling manager and currently manager of the Kilkenny county hurling team and former player who was previously the manager of the Galway senior hurling team from 2021 to 2024. In his playing career he was nicknamed "King Henry" because of his directive style, dominance, competitive spirit, and leadership on the field. He is the only player to win 'hurler of the year' three times, in 2002, 2006, and 2012. A versatile forward who started out in the corner, Shefflin made his name in more commanding positions as a centre or full-forward. He is widely regarded to be one of the greatest players in the history of the sport, with many former players, commentators and fans rating him as the number one player of all time.

Raised in Ballyhale, County Kilkenny, Shefflin played hurling while at secondary school in St Kieran's College, Kilkenny. He joined the Ballyhale Shamrocks senior team as a goalkeeper at the age of 17 in 1996 and spent the next 21 years as one of the club's key outfield players. He is one of only a handful of men to have won the All-Ireland Club Championship as a player and as a manager. Shefflin's association with Kilkenny began as a member of the minor team in 1996. He progressed through the under-21 and intermediate ranks before making his senior debut in 1999. Shefflin brought his 18-season association with the black and amber jersey to an end when he announced his inter-county retirement on 25 March 2015.

Shefflin is one of the most decorated players of all time. During his time with Kilkenny, he won 10 All-Ireland Championship titles – more than any other player in history, 13 Leinster Championship titles, six National Hurling League titles, and six Walsh Cup titles. Kilkenny, Cork, Tipperary and Limerick are the only teams in hurling history to have won more All-Ireland titles than Shefflin. Shefflin captained Kilkenny on several occasions, particularly in the 2007 season when he captained the team to All-Ireland honours.

Shefflin also has many personal achievements. He remains the only player to have won three Hurler of the Year awards (2002, 2006 and 2012), while he also claimed 11 All-Stars. His 16-season senior career saw him make a record 71 championship appearances for Kilkenny. He is also the all-time leading scorer for Kilkenny with 27–484 which itself was a national record until surpassed by Joe Canning in 2021. Shefflin was named as RTÉ Sports Person of the Year in 2006 and has been repeatedly named on teams of the greatest players of all time, including the Etihad 125 Dream Team in 2009.

== Early years ==
Shefflin was born at the Regional Hospital Cork to Henry and Mae Shefflin (née Fitzgerald). One of a family of four boys and three girls, he was born into a household that had a strong sporting background, particularly in the game of hurling.

Shefflin was educated at St Patrick's national school in Ballyhale where his hurling skills were first noted and honed by the local headmaster, Joe Dunphy. As a child he saw his two older brothers line out with the Kilkenny hurlers at various grades. John Shefflin won an All-Ireland winners' medal in the minor grade in 1990, while Tommy Shefflin won an All-Ireland winners' medal in the under-21 grade that same year. A younger brother, Paul Shefflin, also won Leinster minor medals in the late 1990s.

Shefflin later attended St Kieran's College in Kilkenny, before studying electronics at the Waterford Institute of Technology (WIT). Shefflin later changed course and decided to study both business studies and financial services.

== Personal life ==
Shefflin currently works with New Holland Finance, a subsidiary of Bank of Ireland. His main area of responsibility is in the agri-business side of matters, handling the finance for all the New Holland tractor sales in the locality. His region of responsibility takes in the south-east of the country, including counties Tipperary, Kilkenny, Wexford, Carlow and Kildare.

On 30 March 2007, Shefflin married Deirdre O'Sullivan, a native of Callan, County Kilkenny and a camogie player of note in her own right. Just over a year later in April 2008 the Shefflins celebrated the birth of their first child, a daughter named Sadhbh. On 30 October 2009 Henry Michael Shefflin, the couple's second child and first son, was born. A third child, Siún, was born in March 2011, while the Shefflin's youngest boy, Freddie, was born in April 2014.

== Playing career ==
=== Colleges ===
During his schooling at St Kieran's College in Kilkenny, Shefflin established himself as a key member of the senior hurling team. In 1996 he won his sole Leinster medal as Good Counsel College were narrowly defeated by 1–7 to 1–6. St Colman's College provided the opposition in the subsequent All-Ireland decider. A 1–14 to 2–6 victory gave Shefflin an All-Ireland medal.

=== University ===
During his studies at the Waterford Institute of Technology, Shefflin was an automatic inclusion on the college hurling team. In 1999 he was at full-forward as WIT faced University College Cork in the final of the Fitzgibbon Cup. Two goals from Declan Browne in a six-minute spell before half-time gave WIT a commanding lead. Neil Ronan bagged a fourth goal straight after the interval which helped WIT to a 4–15 to 3–12 victory.

Shefflin lined out in a second successive Fitzgibbon Cup decider in 2000. University College Dublin were the opponents on that occasion, however, a 2–10 to 1–6 victory gave WIT the victory. It was Shefflin's second Fitzgibbon Cup medal.

=== Club ===
Shefflin played his club hurling with Ballyhale Shamrocks and had much success with the club. When he was fourteen years-old he failed to make the club's under-16 team, however, Shefflin later became a key member of the Ballyhale minor team. He won a championship medal in that grade in 1997 following a 2–18 to 2–5 defeat of James Stephens.

That same year Shefflin was a key member of the Ballyhale intermediate team. A 4–12 to 3–7 defeat of Graiguenamangh, with Shefflin top scoring with 1–6, secured promotion to the senior grade and gave Shefflin a championship medal.

Success at senior level was slow in coming for Shefflin and Ballyhale. In 2004 it was even rumoured that he was moving clubs to play in Cork with Blackrock, however, this rumour proved to be unfounded.

Two years later he was deployed at centre-forward as Ballyhale faced O'Loughlin Gaels in the senior decider. An impressive 1–22 to 2–11 victory gave Shefflin his first championship medal. He later added a Leinster medal to his collection when Ballyhale secured a comprehensive 1–20 to 1–8 defeat of Birr to take the provincial title for the first time in seventeen years. On 17 March 2007 Ballyhale Shamrocks faced Loughrea in the All-Ireland decider. On a day when Shefflin and James "Cha" Fitzpatrick were held scoreless, the three Reid brothers contributed 3–7 from play. A 3–12 to 2–8 victory gave Shefflin an All-Ireland Senior Club Hurling Championship medal.

Injury resulted in Shefflin missing Ballyhale's second successive championship victory in 2007, however, he was back on the starting fifteen as Ballyhale Shamrocks made it three-in-a-row in 2008. A 2–11 to 0–12 defeat of James Stephens gave Shefflin a second championship medal on the field of play. He later won a second Leinster medal as the Shamrocks defeated reigning champions Birr by 2–13 to 1–11.

Shefflin won a third championship medal in 2009, as Ballyhale claimed a record-equaling four-in-a-row following a 1–14 to 1–11 defeat of James Stephens once again. The subsequent provincial decider saw Ballyhale hit fifteen wides, however, Shefflin still collected a third Leinster medal following a 1–16 to 1–8 defeat of Tullamore. On 17 March 2010 Ballyhale faced three-in-a-row hopefuls Portumna in a "dream" All-Ireland decider. The game failed to live up to the billing, however, 1–19 to 0–17 victory gave Shefflin a second All-Ireland medal.

Five-in-a-row proved beyond Ballyhale Shamrocks, however, the team bounced back in 2012 having lost the championship decider the previous year. A far from vintage 0–16 to 0–12 defeat of Dicksboro gave Shefflin a fourth championship medal.

Shefflin won a fifth championship medal in 2014 as the Shamrocks claimed a 1–20 to 1–13 defeat of reigning champions Clara. He later collected a fourth Leinster medal and proved the difference in a 0–21 to 1–14 defeat of Kilcormac/Killoughey. On 17 March 2015 Ballyhale faced Kilmallock in the All-Ireland decider. A complete mismatch saw Shamrocks win the game by 1–18 to 1–6, with Shefflin collecting a third All-Ireland medal.

Shefflin's final championship appearance was in the 2016 Kilkenny Senior Hurling Championship final on 30 October 2016 in Nowlan Park in the county final. However victory went to the O'Loughlin Gaels GAA club in a closely fought final on a scoreline of 0–19 to 1–12.

=== Minor, under-21 and intermediate ===
Shefflin first played for Kilkenny in 1996 when he joined the minor side. He won his first Leinster medal that year following a 1–16 to 1–11 defeat of Dublin. The All-Ireland campaign came to an end at the semi-final stage.

Shefflin was eligible for the minor grade again in 1997. A 3–16 to 1–10 defeat of Offaly gave him a second successive Leinster medal, however, his quest for an All-Ireland medal came to an end at the semi-final stage.

He also played minor football with Kilkenny.

While just out of the minor grade Shefflin was drafted onto the Kilkenny intermediate hurling team in 1998. That year he captured a Leinster medal following a 3–13 to 0–11 defeat of Wexford. Shefflin later lined out in the All-Ireland decider with Limerick providing the opposition. An interesting game developed between these two sides, however, at the final whistle victory went to Limerick by 4–16 to 2–17.

That same year Shefflin was added to the Kilkenny under-21 team. A 2–10 to 0–12 defeat of Dublin in the provincial decider gave him his first Leinster medal in that grade.

Shefflin won a second Leinster medal in 1999, following a 1–17 to 1–6 trouncing of Offaly. The subsequent All-Ireland decider was a thrilling affair, with Kilkenny securing a narrow 1–13 to 0–14 defeat of Galway to give Shefflin his sole All-Ireland medal.

=== Senior ===
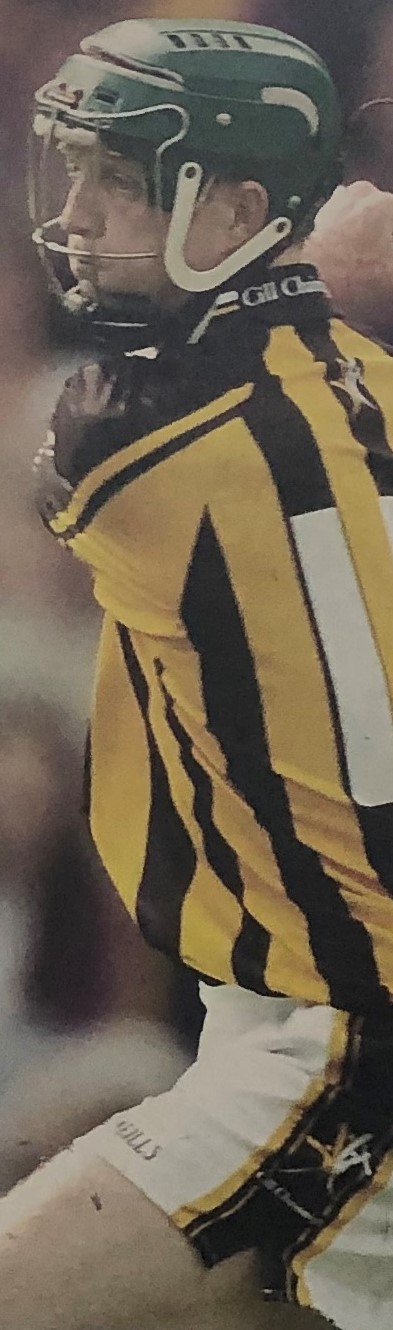
Shefflin, playing for Kilkenny

==== Unsuccessful beginning ====
Shefflin made his senior competitive debut for Kilkenny on 21 February 1999 in a 0–14 to 1–9 league defeat by Cork. That campaign ended at the semi-final stage, however, Shefflin retained his place on the starting fifteen for the subsequent championship, making his provincial debut in a 6–21 to 1–14 semi-final trouncing of Laois. Kilkenny later faced Offaly in the provincial final. A huge 5–14 to 1–16 victory over their near rivals and reigning All-Ireland champions gave Kilkenny the win and gave Shefflin a first Leinster medal. The subsequent All-Ireland decider saw Kilkenny face Cork on 12 September 1999. In a dour contest played on a wet day, Cork trailed by 0–5 to 0–4 after a low-scoring first half. Kilkenny increased the pace after the interval, pulling into a four-point lead. Cork moved up a gear and through Joe Deane, Ben O'Connor and Seánie McGrath Cork scored five unanswered points. Kilkenny could only manage one more score – a point from a Shefflin free – and Cork held out to win by 0–13 to 0–12.

==== Early successes ====
In 2000, Shefflin won a second successive Leinster medal following another comfortable 2–21 to 1–13 victory over Offaly. As a result of the so-called "back-door" system both sides later faced off against each other again in the All-Ireland final on 10 September 2000. D.J. Carey capitalised on an Offaly mistake after just six minutes to start a goal-fest for 'the Cats'. Carey scored 2–4 in all, sharing his second goal with Shefflin who also scored a goal in the second-half. At the full-time whistle Kilkenny were the champions by 5–15 to 1–14 and Shefflin collected his first All-Ireland medal. He was subsequently honoured with his first All-Star award.

Kilkenny's provincial dominance continued in 2001 and a powerful 2–19 to 0–12 defeat of Wexford gave Shefflin a third Leinster medal.

Kilkenny bounced back in 2002. Shefflin won his first National Hurling League medal, as a late Brian Dowling free secured a narrow 2–15 to 2–14 victory over Cork. He later collected a fourth Leinster medal as Kilkenny recorded a narrow 0–19 to 0–17 defeat of fourteen-man Wexford. On 8 September 2002 Shefflin lined out in his third All-Ireland decider as Kilkenny faced first-round losers Clare. Shefflin and fellow forward D. J. Carey combined to score 2–13 between them, as Kilkenny secured a 2–20 to 0–19 victory. It was a second All-Ireland medal for Shefflin while he was later honoured with his second All-Star award. He also ended the year by being named Hurler of the Year by Texaco, Vodafone and by his peers at the Gaelic Players' Association.

In 2003 Shefflin won a second league medal as Kilkenny came back from eight points down to secure a stunning 5–14 to 5–13 extra-time defeat of Tipperary. He later won a fifth successive Leinster medal, as Kilkenny defeated Wexford by 2–23 to 2–12. The subsequent All-Ireland final on 14 September 2003 saw Kilkenny face Cork for the first time in four years. Both teams remained level for much of the game, exchanging tit-for-tat scores. A Setanta Ó hAilpín goal gave Cork the advantage, however, a Martin Comerford goal five minutes from the end settled the game as Kilkenny went on to win by 1–14 to 1–11. It was Shefflin's third All-Ireland medal. He was later honoured with his third All-Star.

After facing a shock, last-minute 2–15 to 1–16 defeat by Wexford in the Leinster semi-final in 2004, Kilkenny worked their way through the qualifiers and lined out against Cork in the All-Ireland decider on 12 September 2004. The game was expected to be a classic, however, a rain-soaked day made conditions difficult as Kilkenny aimed to secure a third successive championship. The first half was a low-scoring affair and provided little excitement for fans, however, the second half saw Cork completely take over. For the last twenty-three minutes Cork scored nine unanswered points and went on to win the game by 0–17 to 0–9. In spite of ending the year without silverware, Shefflin later collected a fourth All-Star.

Kilkenny were back in form in 2005, with Shefflin winning a third league medal following a 3–20 to 0–15 victory over Clare. "The Cats" later struggled against a wasteful Wexford side, however, a 0–22 to 1–16 victory gave Shefflin a sixth Leinster medal. While a third successive All-Ireland showdown with Cork seemed likely, Galway defeated Kilkenny in the All-Ireland semi-final in one of the games of the decade. In spite of failing to reach the championship decider a fifth All-Star award was quickly added to Shefflin's collection.

==== Four-in-a-row ====
In 2006, Shefflin added a third league medal to his collection following a victory over Limerick. He later won his seventh Leinster medal following another facile 1–23 to 1–12 victory over Wexford. On 3 September 2006 Kilkenny faced a Cork team who were presented with the opportunity to become the first side in nearly thirty years to secure three successive All-Ireland championships. Like previous encounters neither side took a considerable lead, however, Kilkenny had a vital goal from Aidan Fogarty. Cork were in arrears coming into the final few minutes, however, Ben O'Connor scored a late goal for Cork. It was too little too late as the Cats denied Cork on a score line of 1–16 to 1–13. Shefflin collected his fourth All-Ireland medal. He rounded off the year once again by claiming a fifth successive All-Star award, his sixth overall, as well as making a clean sweep of the Hurler of the Year awards.

Shefflin collected an eighth Leinster medal in 2007, as Kilkenny asserted their provincial dominance and defeated Wexford by 2–24 to 1–12. On 2 September 2007 Kilkenny faced defeated Munster finalists and surprise All-Ireland semi-final winners Limerick in the championship decider. Kilkenny got off to a flying start with Eddie Brennan Shefflin scoring two goals within the first ten minutes to set the tone. Shefflin later sustained an injury during the game and had to retire at half-time. In spite of losing their captain and star player, Kilkenny still went on to win the game by 2–19 to 1–15 and Shefflin had the honour of collecting a fifth All-Ireland medal and receiving the Liam MacCarthy Cup. It was later revealed that he ruptured a cruciate knee ligament which kept him out of action for his club until the following summer. Shefflin later captured a seventh All-Star award, a record-breaking sixth in succession.

After sitting out the league campaign in 2008, Shefflin later collected a ninth Leinster medal following a 5–21 to 0–17 defeat of Wexford. On 8 September 2008 Kilkenny faced Waterford in the All-Ireland decider for the first time in forty-five years. In a disappointingly one-sided final, Kilkenny produced a near perfect seventy minutes as Waterford endured a nightmare afternoon. A 23-point winning margin, 3–24 from play, only two wides in the entire match and eight scorers in all with Eddie Brennan and Shefflin leading the way in a 3–30 to 1–13 victory. It was Shefflin's sixth All-Ireland medal, while an eighth All-Star quickly followed.

Shefflin collected a fifth league medal in 2009, as Kilkenny beat Tipperary by 2–26 to 4–17 after a thrilling extra-time victory. He later won a tenth Leinster medal as new challengers Dublin were bested by 2–18 to 0–18. On 6 September Kilkenny were poised to become the second team ever in the history of hurling to win four successive All-Ireland championships when they faced Tipperary in the decider. For long periods Tipp looked the likely winners, however, late goals from Shefflin (penalty) and substitute Martin Comerford finally killed off their efforts to secure a 2–22 to 0–23 victory. Shefflin had collected his seventh All-Ireland medal. He later collected a ninth All-Star award.

==== Continued dominance ====
In 2010, Kilkenny defeated Galway in an eagerly-anticipated but ultimately disappointing provincial decider. A 1–19 to 1–12 victory gave Shefflin an eleventh Leinster medal. In the subsequent All-Ireland semi-final defeat of Cork, Shefflin had to be substituted after he severed his cruciate ligament. While it was feared that this would rule him out of the All-Ireland decider against Tipperary on 5 September, he made a remarkable recovery and was deemed to fit to start that game. After scoring an early free in the final, his knee again gave out and he was replaced after twelve minutes. Tipperary's Lar Corbett subsequently ran riot and scored a hat-trick of goals as Kilkenny fell to a 4–17 to 1–18 defeat.

Kilkenny's stranglehold in Leinster continued in 2011. A 4–17 to 1–15 defeat of Dublin gave "the Cats" a record-breaking seventh successive championship. It was Shefflin's twelfth winners' medal overall. Kilkenny subsequently faced Tipperary in a record-breaking seventh successive All-Ireland decider on 4 September 2011. Goals by Michael Fennelly and Richie Hogan in either half gave Kilkenny, who many viewed as the underdogs going into the game, a 2–17 to 1–16 victory. Shefflin, who collected a record-equaling eighth All-Ireland medal, later collected a tenth All-Star award.

Kilkenny were shocked by Galway in the 2012 Leinster decider, losing by 2–21 to 2–11, however, both sides subsequently met in the All-Ireland decider on 9 September 2012. Kilkenny had led going into the final stretch, however, Joe Canning struck a stoppage time equaliser to level the game at 2–13 to 0–19 and send the final to a replay for the first time since 1959. The replay took place three weeks later on 30 September 2012. Galway stunned the reigning champions with two first-half goals, however, Kilkenny's championship debutant Walter Walsh gave a man of the match performance, claiming a 1–3 haul. The 3–22 to 3–11 Kilkenny victory gave Shefflin a record-breaking ninth All-Ireland medal on the field of play. He was later presented with an eleventh All-Star award, as well as becoming the first player to be named Hurler of the Year for a third time.

On 1 December 2012, Shefflin went off injured in Ballyhale Shamrocks' defeat by Oulart the Ballagh in the provincial club championship. While the problem was initially thought to be just a badly sprained ankle it was later revealed to be ligament damage and a break in his left mid-foot. This injury ruled him out of Kilkenny's successful 2013 National league campaign. A damaged metatarsal delayed his recovery resulting in him missing Kilkenny's opening championship games. Shefflin made his return to hurling when he was introduced for the last five minutes of Kilkenny's 0–20 to 1–14 qualifier defeat of Tipperary. He was included on the starting fifteen for Kilkenny's subsequent All-Ireland quarter-final against Cork. Just before half time Shefflin received a second yellow card and was red carded for the first time in his championship career. Kilkenny went on to lose the game by 0–19 to 0–14. After an appeal to the Central Hearings Committee Shefflin's red card was subsequently rescinded.

==== Tenth All-Ireland medal ====
In 2014, Shefflin collected his sixth league medal, as Kilkenny secured a narrow one-point 2–25 to 1–27 extra-time victory over Tipperary. Shefflin subsequently secured a thirteenth Leinster medal, as a dominant Kilkenny display gave "the Cats" a 0–14 to 1–9 defeat of Dublin. On 7 September 2014, Kilkenny faced Tipperary in the All-Ireland decider, however, Shefflin started the game on the bench before making a brief cameo. In what some consider to be the greatest game of all-time, the sides were level when Tipperary were awarded a controversial free. John O'Dwyer had the chance to win the game, however, his late free drifted wide resulting in a draw. The replay on 27 September 2014 was also a close affair. Goals from brothers Richie and John Power inspired Kilkenny to a 2–17 to 2–14 victory. It was Shefflin's tenth All-Ireland medal.

==== Retirement ====
Following Shefflin's tenth All-Ireland success, speculation began to grow about his possible retirement. After stating in November 2014 that he intended to make a decision after the conclusion of the All-Ireland series of the club championship, Shefflin called a press conference on 25 March 2015 and announced that he was retiring from inter-county hurling. In a statement he said, "When I reflect back over the past 16 years playing the game that I love, at the highest level with Kilkenny, it is impossible to quantify the endless hours of happiness, satisfaction and fulfilment I have enjoyed."

In 2015, Shefflin joined The Sunday Game as an analyst for their coverage of the 2015 All-Ireland Senior Hurling Championship and featured on RTÉ Radio 1.

=== Inter-provincial ===
Shefflin has also lined out with Leinster in the inter-provincial hurling championship. He first played for his province in 1999, however, he had to wait another few years before success in that competition.

In 2002 Leinster faced arch rivals Munster in the decider at Nowlan Park. The game ended in somewhat controversial circumstances when the referee awarded a free when Munster's Peter Queally was deemed to have fouled Jimmy Coogan. Shefflin pointed the free to give Leinster a narrow 4–15 to 3–17 victory. It was Shefflin's first Railway Cup medal.

Leinster were back in the decider again in 2003. Rome was the venue with Connacht providing the opposition. Leinster were nine points in arrears early in the second half, however, the team fought back to secure a 4–9 to 2–12 victory. It was Shefflin's second Railway Cup medal.

In 2009 Shefflin was back on the Leinster team once again. His kicked goal five minutes after the restart set up a 3–18 to 1–17 defeat of Connacht once again.

== Recognition ==
Shefflin is considered to be one of the major personalities in the history of hurling, according to sports experts and former players.

Fellow nine-time All-Ireland medallist and former Kilkenny goalkeeper Noel Skehan said of him in the build-up to the 2012 All-Ireland final: "Oh, as it stands, you’re talking about the greatest hurler ever even if he didn’t win on Sunday. He’ll still be the greatest hurler. He’s a fantastic sportsman. What he has achieved up until now, even forgetting the result on Sunday, you’d have to put him well up on top of the ladder. To do it all on the pitch is a great achievement. To start every championship match since he came on the scene, it goes without saying how good that is and I hope to God that he achieves it."

Six-time All-Ireland dual medallist and All-Ireland-winning manager Jimmy Barry-Murphy wrote: "He is most certainly the greatest hurler that I have ever seen, and I even saw Christy Ring towards the end of his days. But this guy outshines everything that I have ever seen on a hurling field. His work ethic is amazing, and one that others must aspire to if they are to reach the stars."

Writing in the Kilkenny GAA Yearbook 2012, contemporary Cork hurler, Donal Óg Cusack, wrote: "If there is better to come than Henry, I for one would hope to be around to see him. He is the perfect example for every young player. He doesn’t practice and live his life the way he does because he is Henry Shefflin. He is Henry Shefflin BECAUSE he does those things, and doesn’t stop. He drives on."

Five-time All-Ireland medallist D. J. Carey regards Shefflin as the "greatest forward of all time."

In the build-up to Shefflin's bid for a ninth All-Ireland medal, former Tipperary hurler and manager Babs Keating wrote: "If he can do that he can go down as the greatest hurler in every way. If he can do that it is a record that I can't see ever being surpassed."

Joe Canning, the player Shefflin pipped to the Hurler of the Year award in 2012, stated: "Henry is the best player that has every played and his nine All-Ireland medals speaks for itself. Everybody models themselves on him because he is the ultimate team player and everyone wants to be like him...There is no doubt about it – everybody wants to have him on their team. He is probably the best hurler that has ever played."

Eddie Keher, a six-time All-Ireland medallist and the man who Shefflin surpassed as the top scorer of all-time, stated: "Henry Shefflin is the greatest hurler of all time. He's a most sporting player and he's competitive."

Contemporary Waterford hurler John Mullane wrote: "I can't speak highly enough of Shefflin either. Henry is simply irreplaceable and the measure of the man is his ability to bounce back from serious injuries in recent years to get himself fully fit for the championship."

When asked who he considers to be Ireland's greatest ever athlete, former Ireland rugby captain Brian O'Driscoll said: "That would be the hurler Henry Shefflin, this guy has been an absolute phenomenon for the last 12,13 years. He’s won nine All-Ireland championships with his county and they’re not easy to come by."

In 2016, Gerry Davis won the Hennesy Portrait Prize and was commissioned by the National Gallery of Ireland in 2017 to paint a portrait of Shefflin, which is now displayed in the portrait gallery.

== Managerial career ==
=== Ballyhale Shamrocks ===
On 12 December 2017 it was announced that Shefflin would act as co-manager of the Ballyhale Shamrocks senior team alongside his brother Tommy. The Shamrocks won Kilkenny Senior Hurling Championship and Leinster Senior Club Hurling Championship in 2018 before winning the 2019 All-Ireland Senior Club Hurling Championship Final.

On 23 January 2020, it was reported that Shefflin had stepped down as manager of the Ballyhale Shamrocks senior team.

=== Thomastown ===
In November 2020, Shefflin was appointed manager of the Thomastown intermediate team.

=== Galway ===
On 20 October 2021, Shefflin was announced as the new manager of the Galway senior hurling team.

On 3 July 2024, Shefflin departed his role as Galway senior hurling manager after three seasons.

=== Kilkenny Under-20 ===
In September 2025, Shefflin was named as the new manager of the Kilkenny Under-20 team. As a result he left his role as manager of Ballyhale Shamrocks.

=== Kilkenny ===
On 6 July 2026, Shefflin was named as the new manager of the Kilkenny senior hurling team.

== Championship appearances ==
List of appearances
#	Date	Venue	Opponent	Score	Result	W/L/D	Competition
1	20 June 1999	Croke Park, Dublin	Laois	0–10	6–21 : 1–14	W	Leinster Semi-Final
2	11 July 1999	Croke Park, Dublin	Offaly	1–06	5–11 : 1–16	W	Leinster Final
3	15 August 1999	Croke Park, Dublin	Clare	0–03	2–14 : 1–13	W	All-Ireland Semi-Final
4	12 September 1999	Croke Park, Dublin	Cork	0–05	0–12 : 0–13	L	All-Ireland Final
5	19 June 2000	Croke Park, Dublin	Dublin	0–06	3–16 : 0–10	W	Leinster Semi-Final
6	9 July 2000	Croke Park, Dublin	Offaly	0–06	2–21 : 1–13	W	Leinster Final
7	13 August 2000	Croke Park, Dublin	Galway	0–07	2–19 : 0–17	W	All-Ireland Semi-Final
8	10 September 2000	Croke Park, Dublin	Offaly	2–03	5–15 : 1–14	W	All-Ireland Final
9	10 June 2001	Croke Park, Dublin	Offaly	1–06	3–21 : 0–18	W	Leinster Semi-Final
10	8 July 2001	Croke Park, Dublin	Wexford	0–04	2–19 : 0–12	W	Leinster Final
11	19 August 2001	Croke Park, Dublin	Galway	0–09	1–13 : 2–15	L	All-Ireland Semi-Final
12	10 June 2002	Semple Stadium, Thurles	Offaly	0–11	2–20 : 1–14	W	Leinster Semi-Final
13	6 July 2002	Croke Park, Dublin	Wexford	0–08	0–19 : 0–17	W	Leinster Final
14	18 August 2002	Croke Park, Dublin	Tipperary	0–07	1–20 : 1–16	W	All-Ireland Semi-Final
15	8 September 2002	Croke Park, Dublin	Clare	1–07	2–20 : 0–19	W	All-Ireland Final
16	6 June 2003	Nowlan Park, Kilkenny	Dublin	1–04	3–16 : 0–10	W	Leinster Semi-Final
17	6 July 2003	Croke Park, Dublin	Wexford	1–08	2–23 : 1–22	W	Leinster Final
18	17 August 2003	Croke Park, Dublin	Tipperary	1–07	3–18 : 0–15	W	All-Ireland Semi-Final
19	11 September 2003	Croke Park, Dublin	Cork	0–06	1–14 : 1–11	W	All-Ireland Final
20	13 June 2004	Croke Park, Dublin	Wexford	0–05	1–16 : 2–15	L	Leinster Semi-Final
21	26 June 2004	Dr. Cullen Park, Carlow	Dublin	2–08	4–22 : 0–8	W	All-Ireland Qualifier R1
22	11 July 2004	Semple Stadium, Thurles	Galway	2–11	4–20 : 1–10	W	All-Ireland Qualifier R3
23	25 July 2004	Croke Park, Dublin	Clare	0–08	1–13 : 1–13	D	All-Ireland Quarter Final
24	31 July 2004	Semple Stadium, Thurles	Clare	0–03	1–11 : 0–9	W	All-Ireland Quarter-Final Replay
25	8 August 2004	Croke Park, Dublin	Waterford	2–04	3–12 : 0–18	W	All-Ireland Semi-Final
26	12 September 2004	Croke Park, Dublin	Cork	0–05	0–9 : 0–17	L	All-Ireland Final
27	3 July 2005	Croke Park, Dublin	Offaly	2–11	6–28 : 0–15	W	Leinster Semi-Final
28	3 July 2005	Croke Park, Dublin	Wexford	0–08	0–22 : 1–16	W	Leinster Final
29	31 July 2005	Croke Park, Dublin	Limerick	0–09	0–18 : 0–13	W	All-Ireland Quarter-Final
30	21 August 2005	Croke Park, Dublin	Galway	1–09	4–18 : 5–18	L	All-Ireland Semi-Final
31	10 June 2006	Cusack Park, Mullingar	Westmeath	0–08	1–27 : 1–13	W	Leinster Semi-Final
32	2 July 2006	Croke Park, Dublin	Wexford	1–07	1–23 : 1–12	W	Leinster Final
33	22 July 2006	Semple Stadium, Thurles	Galway	0–11	2–22 : 3–14	W	All-Ireland Quarter-Final
34	13 August 2006	Croke Park, Dublin	Clare	1–13	2–21 : 1–16	W	All-Ireland Semi-Final
35	3 September 2006	Croke Park, Dublin	Cork	0–08	1–16 : 1–13	W	All-Ireland Final
36	10 June 2007	O'Moore Park, Portlaoise	Offaly	0–12	1–27 : 1–13	W	Leinster Semi-Final
37	1 July 2007	Croke Park, Dublin	Wexford	0–09	2–24 : 1–12	W	Leinster Final
38	28 July 2007	Croke Park, Dublin	Galway	0–07	3–22 : 1–18	W	All-Ireland Quarter-Final
39	5 August 2007	Croke Park, Dublin	Wexford	0–14	0–23 : 1–13	W	All-Ireland Semi-Final
40	2 September 2007	Croke Park, Dublin	Limerick	1–02	2–19 : 1–15	W	All-Ireland Final
41	15 June 2008	O'Moore Park, Portlaoise	Offaly	0–11	2–24 : 0–12	W	Leinster Semi-Final
42	6 July 2008	Croke Park, Dublin	Wexford	1–07	5–21 : 0–17	W	Leinster Final
43	10 August 2008	Croke Park, Dublin	Cork	0–09	1–23 : 0–17	W	All-Ireland Semi-Final
44	7 September 2008	Croke Park, Dublin	Waterford	0–08	3–30 : 1–13	W	All-Ireland Final
45	21 June 2009	O'Connor Park, Tullamore	Galway	0–10	2–20 : 3–13	W	Leinster Semi-Final
46	5 July 2009	Croke Park, Dublin	Dublin	0–06	2–18 : 0–18	W	Leinster Final
47	9 August 2009	Croke Park, Dublin	Waterford	1–14	2–23 : 3–15	W	All-Ireland Semi-Final
48	6 September 2009	Croke Park, Dublin	Tipperary	1–08	2–22 : 0–23	W	All-Ireland Final
49	20 June 2010	Croke Park, Dublin	Dublin	0–12	4–19 : 0–12	W	Leinster Semi-Final
50	4 July 2010	Croke Park, Dublin	Galway	1-07	1–19 : 1–12	W	Leinster Final
51	8 August 2010	Croke Park, Dublin	Cork	0-02	3–22 : 0–19	W	All-Ireland Semi-Final
52	5 September 2010	Croke Park, Dublin	Tipperary	0-01	1–18 : 4–17	L	All-Ireland Final
53	12 June 2011	Wexford Park, Wexford	Wexford	0-09	1–26 : 1–15	W	Leinster Semi-Final
54	3 July 2011	Croke Park, Dublin	Dublin	1-09	4–17 : 1–15	W	Leinster Final
55	7 August 2011	Croke Park, Dublin	Waterford	0-07	2–19 : 1–16	W	All Ireland Semi-Final
56	4 September 2011	Croke Park, Dublin	Tipperary	0-07	2–17 : 1–16	W	All Ireland Final
57	23 June 2012	Portlaoise, Laois	Dublin	0–10	2–21 : 0–09	W	Leinster Semi-Final
58	8 July 2012	Croke Park, Dublin	Galway	1-08	2–11 : 2–21	L	Leinster Final
59	29 July 2012	Semple Stadium, Thurles	Limerick	2-06	4–16 : 1–16	W	Quarter-Final
60	19 August 2012	Croke Park, Dublin	Tipperary	0–11	4–24 : 1–15	W	All-Ireland Semi-Final
61	9 September 2012	Croke Park, Dublin	Galway	0–12	0–19 : 2–13	D	All-Ireland Final
62	30 September 2012	Croke Park, Dublin	Galway	0-09	3–22 : 3–11	W	All-Ireland Final – Replay
63	6 July 2013 (Sub)	Nowlan Park, Kilkenny	Tipperary	0–00	0–20 : 1–14	W	All-Ireland Qualifier R2
64	13 July 2013	Semple Stadium, Thurles	Waterford	0–00	1–22 : 2–16	W	All-Ireland Qualifier R3
65	28 July 2013	Semple Stadium, Thurles	Cork	0–00	0–14 : 0–19	L	All-Ireland Quarter-Final
66	22 June 2014 (Sub)	O'Connor Park, Tullamore	Galway	0–01	3–22 : 5–16	D	Leinster Semi-Final
67	28 June 2014 (Sub)	O'Connor Park, Tullamore	Galway	0–00	3–19 : 1–17	W	Leinster Semi-Final replay
68	22 June 2014 (Sub)	Croke Park, Dublin	Dublin	0–03	0–24 : 1-09	W	Leinster Final
69	10 August 2014 (Sub)	Croke Park, Dublin	Limerick	0–00	2–13 : 0–17	W	All-Ireland Semi-Final
70	7 September 2014 (Sub)	Croke Park, Dublin	Tipperary	0–00	3–22 : 1–28	D	All-Ireland Final
71	27 September 2014 (Sub)	Croke Park, Dublin	Tipperary	0–00	2–17 : 2–14	W	All-Ireland Final replay

All-Ireland Senior Hurling Championship scoring total
Rank	Scores	Rank	Play	Games	Average	Average (play)
1st	27–484 (565pts)	1st	24–136 (208pts)	71 games	7.95	2.92

=== All-Ireland Final scores ===
List of appearances
#	Date	Venue 2	Opponent	Score	Play	W/L	Result
1	12 September 1999	Croke Park, Dublin	Cork	0–05	0–01	L	0–12 : 0–13
2	10 September 2000	Croke Park, Dublin	Offaly	2–03	1–01	W	5–15 : 1–14
3	8 September 2002	Croke Park, Dublin	Clare	1–07	1–03	W	2–20 : 0–19
4	7 September 2003	Croke Park, Dublin	Cork	0–06	0–02	W	1–14 : 1–11
5	12 September 2004	Croke Park, Dublin	Cork	0–05	0–02	L	0-09 : 0–17
6	3 September 2006	Croke Park, Dublin	Cork	0–08	0–03	W	1–16 : 1–13
7	2 September 2007	Croke Park, Dublin	Limerick	1–02	1–01	W	2–19 : 1–15
8	7 September 2008	Croke Park, Dublin	Waterford	0–08	0–02	W	3–30 : 1–13
9	6 September 2009	Croke Park, Dublin	Tipperary	1–08	0–01	W	2–22 : 0–23
10	5 September 2010	Croke Park, Dublin	Tipperary	0–01	0–00	L	1–18 : 4–17
11	4 September 2011	Croke Park, Dublin	Tipperary	0–07	0–02	W	2–17 : 1–16
12	9 September 2012	Croke Park, Dublin	Galway	0–12	0–01	D	0–19 : 2–13
13	30 September 2012 (Replay)	Croke Park, Dublin	Galway	0–09	0–02	W	3–22 : 3–11

All-Ireland Senior Hurling Finals Scoring Total
Scores (Total)	Rank	Scores (Play)	Rank	Games	Average
5–81 (96pts)	1st	3–21 (30pts)	2nd	13 games	7.15

== Career statistics ==
=== Club ===
Team	Season	Kilkenny		Leinster		All-Ireland		Total	
Team	Season	Apps	Score	Apps	Score	Apps	Score	Apps	Score
Ballyhale Shamrocks	1998–99	2	1–11	—		—		2	1–11
Ballyhale Shamrocks	1999–00	3	1–24	—		—		3	1–24
Ballyhale Shamrocks	2000–01	3	2–18	—		—		3	2–18
Ballyhale Shamrocks	2001–02	2	0–16	—		—		2	0–16
Ballyhale Shamrocks	2002–03	2	0-06	—		—		2	0-06
Ballyhale Shamrocks	2003–04	1	0-08	—		—		1	0-08
Ballyhale Shamrocks	2004–05	3	2–16	—		—		3	2–16
Ballyhale Shamrocks	2005–06	3	1–18	—		—		3	1–18
Ballyhale Shamrocks	2006–07	3	0–24	2	2-08	2	0–11	7	2–43
Ballyhale Shamrocks	2007–08	0	0-00	0	0-00	—		0	0-00
Ballyhale Shamrocks	2008–09	3	1–23	3	0–25	1	0–10	7	1–58
Ballyhale Shamrocks	2009–10	3	1–14	3	1–20	2	0–22	8	2–56
Ballyhale Shamrocks	2010–11	0	0-00	—		—		0	0-00
Ballyhale Shamrocks	2011–12	5	3–42	—		—		5	3–42
Ballyhale Shamrocks	2012–13	3	0–19	1	0-01	—		4	0–20
Ballyhale Shamrocks	2013–14	2	0–14	—		—		2	0–14
Ballyhale Shamrocks	2014–15	3	0–11	2	1-06	2	0-07	7	1–24
Ballyhale Shamrocks	2015–16	3	0–26	—		—		3	0–26
Ballyhale Shamrocks	2016–17	3	0-06	—		—		3	0-06
Ballyhale Shamrocks	2017–18	1	0-00	—		—		1	0-00
Total		48	12–296	11	4–60	7	0–50	66	16–406

=== Inter-county ===
Team	Year	National League			Championship		Total	
Team	Year	Division	Apps	Score	Apps	Score	Apps	Score
Kilkenny	1999	Division 1B	7	2–42	4	1–24	11	3–66
Kilkenny	2000	Division 1B	6	2–39	4	2–21	10	4–60
Kilkenny	2001	Division 1B	5	3–16	3	1–19	8	4–35
Kilkenny	2002	Division 1A	7	3–33	4	1–33	11	4–66
Kilkenny	2003	Division 1A	7	4–53	4	3–25	11	7–78
Kilkenny	2004	Division 1A	6	3–32	7	6–45	13	9–77
Kilkenny	2005	Division 1	5	4–22	4	3–37	9	7–59
Kilkenny	2006	Division 1	2	3–9	5	2–47	7	5–56
Kilkenny	2007	Division 1	1	0–12	5	1–45	6	1–57
Kilkenny	2008	Division 1	0	0-00	4	1–37	4	1–37
Kilkenny	2009	Division 1	4	1–29	4	2–38	8	3–67
Kilkenny	2010	Division 1	0	0-00	4	1–22	4	1–22
Kilkenny	2011	Division 1	0	0-00	4	1–32	4	1–32
Kilkenny	2012	Division 1A	0	0-00	6	3–56	6	3–56
Kilkenny	2013	Division 1A	0	0-00	3	0-00	3	0-00
Kilkenny	2014	Division 1A	7	1–28	6	1–4	13	1–32
Total			57	26–315	71	28–485	128	55–800

== Honours ==
=== Player ===
St Kieran's College

- All-Ireland Colleges' Senior Hurling Championship (1): 1996
- Leinster Colleges' Senior Hurling Championship (1): 1996

Waterford Institute of Technology

- Fitzgibbon Cup (2): 1998–99, 1999–00

Ballyhale Shamrocks

- All-Ireland Senior Club Hurling Championship (3): 2007, 2010, 2015
- Leinster Senior Club Hurling Championship (4): 2006, 2008, 2009, 2014
- Kilkenny Senior Hurling Championship (5): 2006, 2008, 2009, 2012, 2014
- Kilkenny Intermediate Hurling Championship (1): 1997
- Kilkenny Junior Football Championship (1): 2002

Kilkenny

- All-Ireland Senior Hurling Championship (10): 2000, 2002, 2003, 2006, 2007, 2008, 2009, 2011, 2012, 2014
- Leinster Senior Hurling Championship (13): 1999, 2000, 2001, 2002, 2003, 2005, 2006, 2007, 2008, 2009, 2010, 2011, 2014
- National Hurling League (6): 2002, 2003, 2005, 2006, 2009, 2014
- Walsh Cup (6): 2005, 2006, 2007, 2009, 2012, 2014
- Oireachtas Tournament (1): 1999
- All-Ireland Under-21 Hurling Championship (1): 1999
- Leinster Under-21 Hurling Championship (2): 1998, 1999
- Leinster Minor Hurling Championship (2): 1996, 1997
- Leinster Intermediate Hurling Championship (1): 1998

Leinster

- Railway Cup (3): 2002, 2003, 2009

=== Individual ===
Awards

- Texaco Hurler of the Year (3): 2002, 2006, 2012
- All Stars Hurler of the Year (3): 2002, 2006, 2012
- GPA Hurler of the Year (2): 2002, 2006, 2012
- RTÉ Sports Person of the Year (1): 2006
- RTÉ Sports Hall of Fame Award (1): 2015
- All-Stars (11): 2000, 2002, 2003, 2004, 2005, 2006, 2007, 2008, 2009, 2011, 2012
- All-Ireland Senior Hurling Championship Top Scorer (4): 1999, 2004, 2006, 2012
- In May 2020, a public poll conducted by RTÉ.ie named Shefflin in the half-forward line alongside Joe Canning and D. J. Carey in a team of hurlers who had won All Stars during the era of The Sunday Game.
- Also in May 2020, the Irish Independent named Shefflin at number one in its "Top 20 hurlers in Ireland over the past 50 years".

=== Manager ===
Ballyhale Shamrocks

- All-Ireland Senior Club Hurling Championship (2): 2019, 2020
- Leinster Senior Club Hurling Championship (2): 2018, 2019
- Kilkenny Senior Hurling Championship (3): 2018, 2019, 2025

Galway

- Walsh Cup (1): 2023

=== Records ===
- Only male athlete in the history of Gaelic games to have won ten All-Ireland senior winner's medals on the field of play.
- Only player to score a goal in fourteen consecutive championship seasons (1999–2012).
- Joint most Leinster Championship titles (13).
- Most Leinster Championship titles (13) on the field of play.
- Second-highest scorer in the history of the All-Ireland championship (2010–2021).
- Most All-Star awards (11).
- Most 'Player of the Year' awards (3) – 2002, 2006, 2012.
- Highest scorer from play (24 – 136 = 208 points) in the history of the All Ireland championship (including All Ireland Final replay 2014).
- Highest scorer in All-Ireland finals 5–81 (96 pts).
- Second-highest scorer from play in All-Ireland finals.

== Sources ==
- Corry, Eoghan, The GAA Book of Lists (Hodder Headline Ireland, 2005).
- Donegan, Des, The Complete Handbook of Gaelic Games (DBA Publications Limited, 2005).

Awards
Preceded by Tommy Dunne	Vodafone Hurler of the Year; 2002	Succeeded by J. J. Delaney
Preceded by Tommy Dunne	Texaco Hurler of the Year; 2002	Succeeded by J. J. Delaney
Preceded by Tommy Dunne	Gaelic Players' Association; Hurler of the Year; 2002	Succeeded by J. J. Delaney
Preceded by Jerry O'Connor	Vodafone Hurler of the Year; 2006	Succeeded by Dan Shanahan
Preceded by Jerry O'Connor	Texaco Hurler of the Year; 2006	Succeeded by Dan Shanahan
Preceded by John Gardiner	Gaelic Players' Association; Hurler of the Year; 2006	Succeeded by Dan Shanahan
Preceded by Seán Óg Ó hAilpín	RTÉ Sports Person of the Year; 2006	Succeeded by Pádraig Harrington
Preceded by Michael Fennelly	GAA-GPA Hurler of the Year; 2012	Succeeded by Tony Kelly
Preceded by Michael Fennelly	Texaco Hurler of the Year; 2012	Succeeded by Tony Kelly
Sporting positions
Preceded by Jackie Tyrrell	Kilkenny Senior Hurling Captain; 2007	Succeeded by James 'Cha' Fitzpatrick
Preceded by James 'Cha' Fitzpatrick	Kilkenny Senior Hurling Captain; 2009	Succeeded by Michael Fennelly
Preceded by Michael Fennelly	Kilkenny Senior Hurling Captain; 2009	Succeeded by Michael Fennelly
Preceded by Shane O'Neill	Galway senior hurling team manager 2021–2024	Succeeded by Micheál Donoghue
Achievements
Preceded by Jackie Tyrrell	All-Ireland SHC winning captain 2007	Succeeded by James 'Cha' Fitzpatrick
