= Patrick Morrissey =

Patrick Morrissey may refer to:

- Pat Morrissey (Australian footballer) (1891–1938), Australian rules footballer
- Patrick Joseph Morrissey (1936–1985), Irish policeman
- Pat Morrissey (1948–2005), Irish footballer
- Pa Morrissey (born 1981), Irish Gaelic footballer
- SS Patrick H. Morrissey, a 1943 liberty ship

== See also ==
- Patrick Morrisey (born 1967), 34th Attorney General and current governor of West Virginia.
