= Dan Shanahan =

Waterford hurler (born 1977)

Personal information
- Native name: Dónal Ó Seanacháin (Irish)
- Nicknames: Big Dan, Dan the man
- Born: 4 January 1977 (age 49) Lismore, County Waterford, Ireland
- Occupation: Truck driver
- Height: 6 ft 4 in (193 cm)

Sport
- Sport: Hurling
- Position: Wing forward
Club
- Years: Club
- 1993–2022: Lismore
Club titles
- Waterford titles: 1
Inter-county*
Years	County	Apps (scores)
1995–2010	Waterford	52 (21–58)
Inter-county titles
- Munster titles: 4
- All-Irelands: 0
- NHL: 1
- All Stars: 3
- *Inter County team apps and scores correct as of 17:49, 7 August 2012.

Daniel Shanahan (born 4 January 1977) is an Irish former hurler. He has been a selector with the Waterford county team since 2013.

Born in Lismore, County Waterford, Shanahan was introduced to hurling by his father, a former hurler with Waterford. He was a Harty Cup runner-up with Lismore CBS while simultaneously enjoying championship successes at senior level with the Lismore club.

Shanahan made his debut on the inter-county scene at the age of seventeen when he first linked up with the Waterford minor team. A two-time Munster runner-up in this grade, he later lined out with the under-21 team. Shanahan joined the senior team in 1995. He went on to play a key role for Waterford in attack during a hugely successful era, and won four Munster medals and one National Hurling League medal. He was an All-Ireland runner-up on one occasion.

Shanahan represented the Munster inter-provincial team at various times throughout his career, winning one Railway Cup medal in 2007. At club level he won one championship medal with Lismore.

Throughout his career Shanahan made 52 championship appearances for Waterford. His tally of 21-58 marks him out as Waterford's fourth highest scorer of all time, while he is the all-time leading goal-scorer for Waterford. Shanahan announced his inter-county retirement on 18 August 2010.

Shanahan is widely regarded as one of Waterford's greatest hurlers. During his career he won three All-Star awards, while in 2007 he was named Texaco, All-Star and GPA Hurler of the Year.

His brother, Maurice, also played at senior level for Waterford, and his former teammate, Eoin Kelly, is his cousin.

In retirement from inter-county hurling, Shanahan became involved in team management and coaching. In October 2013 he became part of Derek McGrath's management team to the Waterford senior hurlers.

== Playing career ==
=== Club ===
Shanahan played his club hurling with the Lismore club in Waterford.

He had several successes at underage levels winning county medals in hurling at under-14, under-16, minor and under-21 levels. Shanahan was only sixteen years-old when he won a senior county club championship in 1993 following a one-point defeat of Passage. The following years proved to be somewhat frustrating for Shanahan and Lismore. Ballygunner and Mount Sion both had very strong teams and dominated the county scene for a number of years. Despite having a depth of talent within their ranks, Lismore were unable to win another county title in this period, going very close on a number of occasions most notably in the 1996, 2001 and 2009 county finals. In 2016 and at 39 years old, Shanahan finally captured another county medal, this time in the intermediate grade. This win was followed by Lismore winning the Munster Intermediate championship with a victory over Kerry side Kilmoyley.

He was still playing for Lismore at the age of 45 in the 2022 championship. He had announced his retirement at the conclusion of the season, playing his last game for Lismore against Mount Sion in the Waterford SHC quarter-final.

He returned to play for Lismore in 2023 and in the following year he came on as a substitute in the 2024 championship relegation play-off win on 16 August against Tallow, it was his 32nd consecutive season playing adult club hurling.

=== Inter-county ===
Shanahan's inter-county career began with the Waterford minor and under-21 teams. He was a member of the Waterford team that reached the Munster minor final in 1994. However, Cork ran out comfortable winners. The following year Shanahan and Waterford were back in the Munster final against the same opposition, and once again it was the Cork men who emerged victorious. He was also a member of the Lismore CBS side that reached the Harty cup final the same year. A star studded Midleton CBS outfit were the opposition, and despite Shanahan being amongst the goals, it was the east Cork school who took home the cup.

He joined the Waterford senior team in 1995, however, he did not make his senior championship debut until 1998. That year Waterford held All-Ireland champions Clare to a draw in the Munster final, however, the Decies lost the replay. Shanahan's side later faced Kilkenny in the All-Ireland semi-final in what would be the county's first appearance in Croke Park since 1963. Kilkenny won by a single point.

In 2002 Waterford emerged from the doldrums by reaching the Munster final once again, however, Shanahan could not command a definite place on the starting fifteen. In spite of this he came on as a substitute to claim his first Munster winners' medal as Waterford defeated Tipperary by 2–23 to 3–12. It was their first provincial crown in thirty-nine years.

After surrendering the Munster title to Cork in 2003, Shanahan's side were back in the provincial showpiece for a third successive year in 2004. He was by now a regular on the starting fifteen. In the Munster final, Waterford defeated Cork for the first time in forty-five years to take the title by 3–16 to 1-21. An All-Ireland appearance subsequently eluded the team yet again. In spite of this there was some consolation at the end of the year as Shanahan's scoring prowess earned him his first All-Star award.

The following few years proved difficult for Shanahan. Waterford crashed out of the early stages of the provincial championship in 2005 and 2006. On both these occasions his team was defeated by Cork in the All-Ireland series. He did, however, win a second All-Star award in 2006.

In 2007 Shanahan added a National Hurling League medal to his collection when Waterford defeated Kilkenny by 0–20 to 0–18 in the final. He later claimed a third Munster winners' medal as Waterford defeated Limerick by 3–17 to 1–14 in the provincial decider. Shanahan himself scored a hat-trick of goals in the second half. While Waterford were viewed as possibly going on and winning the All-Ireland title for the first time in almost half a century, Limerick ambushed Waterford in the All-Ireland semi-final. In spite of falling short of championship success Shanahan's tally of eight goals over the whole championship marked him out as one of the best forwards in the country. He was later presented with a third All-Star award as well as claiming the Vodafone Hurler of the Year award. Shanahan later made a clean sweep of all the player of the year awards by also collecting the GPA Hurler of the Year and Texaco Hurler of the Year awards as well.

2008 began with Waterford losing their opening game to Clare as well as their manager Justin McCarthy. In spite of this poor start Shanahan's side reached the All-Ireland final for the first time in forty-five years. Kilkenny provided the opposition and went on to defeat Waterford by 3–30 to 1–13 to claim a third All-Ireland title in-a-row.

Shanahan was relegated to the subs' bench in 2010 as Waterford faced Cork in another Munster final. A 2-15 apiece draw was the result on that occasion, however, Waterford went on to win the replay after an extra-time goal by Shanahan. It was a fourth Munster winners' medal for Shanahan, a record that he shares with five other Waterford players.

In August 2010 he announced his retirement from the inter-county game after Waterford's exit to Tipperary in the All Ireland semi final.

=== Inter-provincial ===
Shanahan was also a veteran of five inter-provincial championship campaigns with Munster. He first lined out with his province in 1998, however, he did not capture a winners medal in this competition until 2007 when Munster defeated Connacht by 2–22 to 2–19.

== Post-playing career ==
Shanahan joined the Laois backroom team under newly appointed manager Willie Maher in late 2022, having previously been part of a Bennettsbridge management team together.

== Honours ==
=== Team ===
Lismore

- Waterford Senior Club Hurling Championship (1): 1993
- Waterford Intermediate Hurling Championship (1): 2016
- Munster Intermediate Club Hurling Championship (1): 2016
- Waterford Under-21 Hurling Championship (4) 1993, 1996, 1997, 1998
- Waterford Minor Hurling Championships (1) 1995

Waterford

- Munster Senior Hurling Championship (4): 2002, 2004, 2007, 2010
- National Hurling League (1): 2007

Munster

- Inter-provincial Championship (1): 2007

=== Individual ===
- All-Stars: 3
  - 2004, 2006, 2007
- Texaco Hurler of the Year: 1
  - 2007
- All-Stars Hurler of the Year: 1
  - 2007
- GPA Hurler of the Year: 1
  - 2007

Awards
Preceded by Henry Shefflin (Kilkenny)	Vodafone Hurler of the Year; 2007	Succeeded by Eoin Larkin (Kilkenny)
Preceded by Henry Shefflin (Kilkenny)	Texaco Hurler of the Year; 2007	Succeeded by Eoin Larkin (Kilkenny)
Preceded by Henry Shefflin (Kilkenny)	Gaelic Players' Association; Hurler of the Year; 2007	Succeeded by Eoin Larkin (Kilkenny)
