= Eugene McEntee =

Irish hurler

Personal information
- Native name: Eoghan Mac an tSaoi (Irish)
- Born: Ballinasloe, County Galway, Ireland
- Occupation: Butcher
- Height: 1.8 m (5 ft 11 in)

Sport
- Sport: Hurling
- Position: Full Back
Club
- Years: Club
- 1996-2014: Portumna
Club titles
- Galway titles: 6
- Connacht titles: 3
- All-Ireland Titles: 4
Inter-county
Years	County	Apps (scores)
2009	Galway	1 (0-0)

Eugene McEntee (born 1978 in Portumna, County Galway, Ireland) is an Irish former sportsperson. He played hurling with his local club Portumna and was a member of the Galway senior inter-county team in 2009. McEntee captained Portumna to the All-Ireland title in 2006.

Achievements
Preceded by Peter Barry (James Stephens)	All-Ireland Senior Club Hurling Final winning captain 2005-06	Succeeded by Tom Coogan (Ballyhale Shamrocks)
