= GPA Hurler of the Year =

The GPA Hurler of the Year is a hurling award that honours the achievements of a hurler of outstanding excellence. At the end of every Hurling Championship the members of the Gaelic Players Association, the players 'union', vote on which of its members has played the best hurling in the previous year. As the award is voted on by the players it is often viewed as one of the greatest individual honours. Unlike other Gaelic Athletic Association awards the GPA Hurler of the Year is presented with a new car. In September 2011 the GAA and GPA announced that their respective annual player awards schemes were to merge under the sponsorship of Opel. The first merged awards were given out in 2011.

== GPA Hurlers of the Year ==
| 2022 | Diarmaid Byrnes | Limerick |
| 2021 | Cian Lynch | Limerick |
| 2020 | Gearóid Hegarty | Limerick |
| 2018 | Cian Lynch | Limerick |
| 2016 | Austin Gleeson | Waterford |
| 2015 | T.J. Reid | Kilkenny |
| 2014 | Richie Hogan | Kilkenny |
| 2013 | Tony Kelly | Clare |
| 2012 | Henry Shefflin | Kilkenny |
| 2011 | Michael Fennelly | Kilkenny |
| 2010 | Lar Corbett | Tipperary |
| 2009 | Tommy Walsh | Kilkenny |
| 2008 | Eoin Larkin | Kilkenny |
| 2007 | Dan Shanahan | Waterford |
| 2006 | Henry Shefflin | Kilkenny |
| 2005 | John Gardiner | Cork |
| 2004 | Seán Óg Ó hAilpín | Cork |
| 2003 | J. J. Delaney | Kilkenny |
| 2002 | Henry Shefflin | Kilkenny |
| 2001 | Tommy Dunne | Tipperary |
