= Texaco Hurler of the Year =

Discontinued hurling award

The Texaco Hurler of the Year was a hurling award, created in 1958, that honoured the achievements of a hurler of outstanding excellence. It was part of the Texaco Sportstars Awards, in which Irish sportspeople from all fields were honoured.

The award was presented annually to the hurler considered to have performed the best over the previous year in the Hurling Championship. Voting for the award was undertaken by a select group of journalists from television and the print media. The award itself was 14 inches high.

This award was separate from the All Stars Hurler of the Year, awarded by the GAA since 1995, as part of the GAA All Stars Awards.

The award was discontinued in 2012 after Texaco withdrew their sponsorship.

== Recipients ==
Year	Player	County	Club	Notes
2012	Henry Shefflin	Kilkenny	Ballyhale Shamrocks	Third win
2011	Michael Fennelly	Kilkenny	Ballyhale Shamrocks	
2010	Lar Corbett	Tipperary	Thurles Sarsfields	
2009	Tommy Walsh	Kilkenny	Tullaroan	
2008	Eoin Larkin	Kilkenny	James Stephens	
2007	Dan Shanahan	Waterford	Lismore	Did not win the All-Ireland
2006	Henry Shefflin	Kilkenny	Ballyhale Shamrocks	Second win
2005	Jerry O'Connor	Cork	Newtownshandrum	
2004	Seán Óg Ó hAilpín	Cork	Na Piarsaigh	
2003	J. J. Delaney	Kilkenny	Fenians	
2002	Henry Shefflin	Kilkenny	Ballyhale Shamrocks	
2001	Tommy Dunne	Tipperary	Toomevara	
2000	D. J. Carey	Kilkenny	Young Irelands	Second win
1999	Brian Corcoran	Cork	Erin's Own	Second win
1998	Brian Whelahan	Offaly	Birr	Second win
1997	Jamesie O'Connor	Clare	St Josephs Doora-Barefield	
1996	Larry O'Gorman	Wexford	Faythe Harriers	
1995	Seánie McMahon	Clare	St.Josephs Doora-Barefield	
1994	Brian Whelahan	Offaly	Birr	Did not win an All-Star
1993	D. J. Carey	Kilkenny	Young Irelands	
1992	Brian Corcoran	Cork	Erin's Own	Did not win the All-Ireland
1991	Pat Fox	Tipperary	Éire Óg	
1990	Tony O'Sullivan	Cork	Na Piarsaigh	
1989	Nicky English	Tipperary	Lattin-Cullen	
1988	Tony Keady	Galway	Kilimordaly	
1987	Joe Cooney	Galway	Sarsfield's	
1986	Ger Cunningham	Cork	St. Finbarr's	
1985	Eugene Coughlan	Offaly	Seir Kieran	
1984	John Fenton	Cork	Midleton	
1983	Frank Cummins	Kilkenny	Blackrock	
1982	Noel Skehan	Kilkenny	Bennettsbridge	
1981	Pat Delaney	Offaly	Kinnitty	Did not win an All-Star
1980	Joe Connolly	Galway	Castlegar	
1979	Ger Henderson	Kilkenny	Fenians	
1978	John Horgan	Cork	Blackrock	
1977	Denis Coughlan	Cork	Glen Rovers	
1976	Tony Doran	Wexford	Buffers Alley	Did not win the All-Ireland
1975	Liam O'Brien	Kilkenny	James Stephens	
1974	Pat Henderson	Kilkenny	Fenians	
1973	Éamonn Grimes	Limerick	South Liberties	
1972	Eddie Keher	Kilkenny	Rower-Inistioge	
1971	Michael Keating	Tipperary	Ballybacon-Grange	
1970	Pat McDonnell	Cork	Inniscarra	
1969	Ted Carroll	Kilkenny	Lisdowney	
1968	Dan Quigley	Wexford	Rathnure	
1967	Ollie Walsh	Kilkenny	Thomastown	
1966	Justin McCarthy	Cork	Passage	
1965	Jimmy Doyle	Tipperary	Thurles Sarsfields	
1964	John Doyle	Tipperary	Holycross-Ballycahill	
1963	Séamus Cleere	Kilkenny	Bennettsbridge	
1962	Donie Nealon	Tipperary	Burgess-Youghlarra	
1961	Liam Devaney	Tipperary	Borris-Ileigh	
1960	Nick O'Donnell	Wexford	Ferns St. Aidans	
1959	Christy Ring	Cork	Glen Rovers	Did not win the All-Ireland
1958	Tony Wall	Tipperary	Thurles Sarsfields	
