= Don Hyland =

Irish hurler and Gaelic footballer

Personal information
- Born: 28 January 1973 (age 53) Wicklow, Ireland
- Height: 5 ft 10 in (178 cm)

Sport
- Sport: Hurling
- Position: Full Forward
Club
- Years: Club
- ?: Carnew Emmets
Club titles
- Wicklow titles: 7
- Leinster titles: ?
Inter-county
- Years: County
- 1990-2011: Wicklow
Inter-county titles
- Leinster titles: 0
- All Stars: 0

Don Hyland (born 28 January 1973) is a hurler from County Wicklow, Ireland. He played with the county team for almost 20 years, winning every other honour available to him at club and county level, including 7 Kehoe Cups, League, and 1 All-Ireland Senior B Hurling Championship.

In 2009, Hyland retired from inter-county hurling after a crushing loss to Wesmeath in the Christy Ring Cup. But he returned in 2010 to help Wicklow win an NHL Div 3B title and reach the semi-final of the Christy Ring Cup but lost out to Kerry on the day. In 2011 he helped Wicklow to win Div 3A of the National Hurling League and to the final of the Christy Ring Cup but once again lost out to Kerry. He announced his inter-county retirement at the age of 39 in 2012.

In 2002 he became the first Wicklow man to win a Railway Cup medal. He added a second in 200?. He played in six inter-provincial championships with Leinster from 1997 to 2003.

Hyland played both Gaelic football and hurling with his club Carnew Emmets winning 7 Wicklow Senior Hurling Championship medals in 1989, 1991, 2000, 2002, 2004, 2006, 2009.
