= 2004–05 All-Ireland Senior Club Hurling Championship =

All-Ireland Senior Club Hurling Championship 2004–05
Championship Details
- Dates: 17 October 2004 – 17 March 2005
- Teams: 27

All Ireland Champions
- Winners: James Stephens (3rd win)
- Captain: Peter Barry
- Manager: Adrian Finan

All Ireland Runners-up
- Runners-up: Athenry
- Captain: Eugene Cloonan
- Manager: Billy Caulfield

Provincial Champions
- Munster: Toomevara
- Leinster: James Stephens
- Ulster: O'Donovan Rossa
- Connacht: Athenry

Championship Statistics
- Matches Played: 27
- Top Scorer: Eoin Larkin (3–33)

The 2004–05 All-Ireland Senior Club Hurling Championship was the 35th staging of the All-Ireland Senior Club Hurling Championship, an inter-county knockout competition for Ireland's top championship clubs representing each county.

The defending champion was Newtownshandrum; however, the club failed to qualify after being beaten by Cloyne in the Cork SHC semi-final.

The All-Ireland finall was played at Croke Park in Dublin on 17 March 2004, between James Stephens of Kilkenny and Athenry of Galway, in what was a first championship meeting between the teams. James Stephens won the match by 0–19 to 0–14 to claim a third title overall and a first title in 23 years.

Eoin Larkin was the championship's top scorer with 3–33.

== Connacht Senior Club Hurling Championship ==
=== Connacht quarter-finals ===
24 October 2004 Quarter-final	Oran	0–15 – 0–08	St. Mary's Kiltoghert	Kilcoyne Park
	C Kelly (0–9), A Kelly (0–4), P Crehan (0–1), J Shally (0–1).	Report	C Cunniffe (0–6), J Glancy (0–1).	Referee: JJ Larkin (Galway)

25 October 2004 Quarter-final	Tubbercurry	0–06 – 1–15	Ballyhaunis	Kilcoyne Park
	P Seevers 0–5, D McDonagh 0–1.		K Higgins 0–6, H Carney 1–2, P Higgins 0–3, D McConn 0–2, J Tynan 0–1, T Phillips 0–1.

=== Connacht semi-final ===
31 October 2004 Semi-final	Oran	0–11 – 0–13	Ballyhaunis	Athleague GAA Grounds
	C Kelly 0–5, F Quine 0–2, A Kelly 0–1, K McDermott 0–1, G Fallon 0–1, J Shally 0–1.		K Higgins 0–9, P McConn 0–2, D McConn 0–1, J Tynan 0–1.

=== Connacht final ===
14 November 2004 Final	Ballyhaunis	0–07 – 2–16	Athenry	Fr O'Hara Park
	K Higgins 0–4, B Keogh 0–1, P Higgins 0–1, P McConn 0–1.		E Cloonan 1–6, D Donohue 1–3, J Rabbitte 0–3, D Moran 0–2, A Poinard 0–2.	Referee: M Carroll (Roscommon)

== Leinster Senior Club Hurling Championship ==
=== Leinster first round ===
17 October 2004 First round	Castletown Geoghegan	1–12 – 2–17	Portlaoise	Castletown Geoghegan GAA Park
	A Mangan 0–9, K Gorry 0–2, R Whelan 0–1.		N Costello 1–8, B McCormack 1–2, E Fennelly 0–3, O Browne 0–2, T Mulligan 0–1, B O’Reilly 0–1.	Referee: B Garvan (Offaly)

17 October 2004 First round	Carnew Emmets	4–20 – 0–05	Wolfe Tones	Pearse Park
	D Hyland 2–7, V Flaherty 1–1, J Murphy 0–4, R Doyle 1–0, E O’Sullivan 0–2, E Kennedy 0–2, T Collins 0–2, D Doran 0–1, P Rosney 0–1.		S Browne 0–5.	Referee: J Owens (Wexford)

17 October 2004 First round	Kilmessan	0–22 – 1–06	Pearse Óg	Páirc Tailteann
	N Horan 0–10, S Clynch 0–6, M Reilly 0–2, J Keenan 0–2, G O’Neill 0–1, C Curtis 0–1.		M Larkin 1–0, P Callan 0–3, G Smith 0–2, S Conroy 0–1.	Referee: M Butler (Dublin)

23 October 2004 First round	Naomh Bríd	2–09 – 1–06	Ardclough	St Conleth's Park
	D O'Leary 1–2, J Tavener 0–4, P Hickey 1–0, B Nolan 0–1, B Lawlor 0–1, S Watchorn 0–1.		B Byrne 1–1, T Spain 0–2, C Buggy 0–1, A Whelan 0–1, A Carr 0–1.

=== Leinster quarter-finals ===
31 October 2004 Quarter-final	Carnew Emmets	0–08 – 0–13	Coolderry	Pearse Park
	D Murray 0–6, four frees; D Dooley, C Parlon 0–2 each, S Tooher, P O'Connor, B Carroll 0–1 each.	Report	D Hyland 0–6, five frees, J Sinnott, T Kennedy 0–1 each..

31 October 2004 Quarter-final	Naomh Bríd	0–07 – 2–14	Oulart-the Ballagh	Dr. Cullen Park
	M Brennan, B Lawler, one free, 0–2 each; D Shaw, free, A Brennan, P Hickey 0–1 each.	Report	D Mythen 1–4; M Jacob 0–4, three frees; M Storey 0–3; P Finn 1–0; S Doyle, A O'Leary, M Kirwan 0–1 each.

31 October 2004 Quarter-final	Portlaoise	0–11 – 1–20	University College Dublin	O'Moore Park
	N Costello (0–8), T Mulligan (0–1), J Phelan (0–1), E Fennelly (0–1).	Report	B Barry (0–6), D Fitzgerald (1–0), S Lucey (0–3), B Murphy (0–3), J O'Connor (0–2), P Morrissey (0–2), R Barry (0–2), B Hogan (0–2).	Referee: F Smith (Meath)

6 November 2004 Quarter-final	Kilmessan	1–10 – 4–13	James Stephens	Páirc Tailteann
	S Clynch, N Horan 0–4 each, P Donnelly 1–0, M Reilly, M O'Shaughnessy 0–1 each.	Report	E Larkin 1–4, D McCormack 1–1, E McCormack 1–1, B McEvoy 0–4, G Whelan 1–0, J Murphy, R Hayes, J Murray 0–1 each.	Referee: K McGrath (Westmeath)

=== Leinster semi-finals ===
14 November 2004 Semi-final	University College Dublin	1–14 – 0–07	Coolderry	O'Moore Park
	B Murphy (0–4, three frees), B Barry (0–4, two 65s, one free), E Ryan (1–0), B Phelan (0–3), B Hogan (0–1), A Smith (0–1), R Barry (0–1).	Report	D Murray (0–3, two 65s, one free), C Parlon (0–2), B Carroll (0–2).

14 November 2004 Semi-final	James Stephens	2–13 – 0–14	Oulart-the Ballagh	Nowlan Park
	E Larkin 1–7 (3f), G Whelan 1–2, R Hayes, E McCormack, B McEvoy, J Murray all 0–1 each.	Report	D Mythen, M Storey 0–3 each, A O'Leary, L Dunne (1f), M Jacob (2f) all 0–2 each, R Jacob, S Doyle 0–1 each.	Referee: P Aherne (Carlow)

=== Leinster final ===
28 November 2004 Final	James Stephens	1–13 – 1–12	University College Dublin	O'Moore Park
	E Larkin (1–7), E McCormack (0–2), B McEvoy (0–1), J Murphy (0–1), R Hayes (0–1), D McCormack (0–1).	Report	A Smith (1–6), R Barry (0–2), D Carter (0–2), B Murphy (0–1).

== Munster Senior Club Hurling Championship ==
=== Munster quarter-finals ===
23 October 2004 Quarter-final	Kilmoyley	1–11 – 5–19	Toomevara	Lerrig Grounds
	S Brick, 0–7 (0–5 frees, 0–1 ‘65’), R Gentleman 1–1, D Young, M Murnane and O Diggins 0–1 each.	Report	K Dunne 0–9 (0–5 frees, 0–2 ‘65s’, 0–1 penalty), W Ryan and P O’Brien 2–2 each, T Dunne 1–1, D Kelly 0–2, T Dunne, B Dunne and M Bevins O-1 each.	Referee: D Kirwan (Cork)

23 October 2004 Quarter-final	Mount Sion	4–08 – 2–11	Ahane	Walsh Park
	S Ryan 4–0; K McGrath 0–5 (3fs); E Kelly 0–2; F O'Shea 0–1.	Report	P Ryan 2–2; J Moran 0–4; N Moran 0–4 (3f); A Doherty 0–1.	Referee: J McDonnell (Tipperary)

=== Munster semi-finals ===
7 November 2004 Semi-final	Mount Sion	4–13 – 0–09	Kilmaley	Walsh Park
	K McGrath 1–4, E Kelly 1–3, S Ryan 1–1, D Kelly 1–1, E McGrath 0–3, B Greene 0–1.	Report	K Kennedy 0–3, C Lynch 0–2, C Clancy 0–2, A Markham 0–1, D McMahon 0–1.	Referee: G Harrington (Cork)

7 November 2004 Semi-final	Toomevara	2–13 – 0–13	Na Piarsaigh	Semple Stadium
	K Dunne (1–4, 4f), W Ryan (1–0), T Dunne (0–3,1f, 1’65), M Bevans, P O’Brien (0–2 each), F Devanney, E Brislane (0–1 each).	Report	G Shaw (0–9, 7f), J Gardiner (0–2), C Connery, SP O’Sullivan (0–1 each).	Referee: P Moore (Waterford)

=== Munster final ===
21 November 2004 Final	Toomevara	1–14 – 1–13	Mount Sion	Semple Stadium
	W. Ryan 1–1; K. Dunne 0–4 (all frees); P. O'Brien 0–3 (0–1 free, 0–1 sideline); F. Devanney 0–2; Tommy Dunne 0–2; E. Brislane, J. O'Brien, 0–1 each.	Report	K. McGrath 1–6 (all frees); E. Kelly 0–3; D. Kelly 0–2; S. Ryan, B. Greene, 0–1 each.	Referee: D Kirwan (Cork)

== Ulster Senior Club Hurling Championship ==
=== Ulster semi-finals ===
17 October 2004 Semi-final	Ballygalget	2–15 – 2–14	Dungiven	Casement Park
	J McGrattan 0–8, (8 f), G Johnson (1–3), M Coulter jun (0–3), S Clarke (1–0), P Monan (0–1).	Report	G McGonigle 1–9 (1–0 pen, 0–9 f), B Mullan (1–0), F Kelly (0–2), F McGuigan (0–1), E Farren (0–1), Kevin Hinphey (0–1).	Referee: T Mcintyre (Antrim)

17 October 2004 Semi-final	O'Donovan Rossa	5–17 – 0–10	Carrickmore	Casement Park
	P Graham (2–8, 0–6 f), A Carabine (1–2), C McDonnell (1–1), C Hamill (0–3), J O'Neill (1–0). A McCormack (0–1), S Shannon (0–1), M McCullough (0–1).	Report	P Cunningham (0–7, 0–6 f), J Kerr (0–2), M Grogan (0–1).	Referee: J Gribben (Down)

=== Ulster final ===
31 October 2004 Final	O'Donovan Rossa	0–16 – 0–14	Ballygalget	Casement Park
	P Graham 0–4 (3f), C Hamill 0–3, P Close 0–2, S Shannon 0–2 (2 '65's), J Boyle, J Connolly, C McDonnell, J O'Neill, M McCullough 0–1.	Report	J McGrattan 0–7 (7f), G Johnston 0–2 (1 pen), A Dynes, M Coulter (f), B Coulter, E Clarke, D Flynn 0–1.	Referee: G Devlin (Armagh)

== All-Ireland Senior Club Hurling Championship ==
=== All-Ireland semi-finals ===
12 February 2005 Semi-final	Athenry	3–12 – 1–11	Toomevara	Cusack Park
	E Cloonan 2–5 (0–4 frees), D Moran 1–0; J Rabbitte 0–2, D Donohue 0–2, B Higgins, L Howley and E Caulfield 0–1 each.	Report	P Hackett 1–0; K Dunne 0–3, all frees; J O’Brien 0–2; T Dunne, W Ryan, P O’Brien, F Devanney, B Dunne and K Cummins 0–1 each.	Referee: A Mac Suibhne (Dublin)

13 February 2005 Semi-final	James Stephens	0–17 – 1–06	O'Donovan Rossa	Parnell Park
	E Larkin (5f, 1 '65) 0–6, E McCormack 0–5, G Whelan, J Tyrrell 0–2 each, B McEvoy, D McCormack 0–1 each.	Report	C McDonnell 1–1, S Shannon (1f), J Connolly, C Hamill, P Graham, J O'Neill 0–1 each.	Referee: J Sexton (Limerick)

=== All-Ireland final ===
17 March 2005 Final	James Stephens	0–19 – 0–14	Athenry	Croke Park
	E Larkin 0–9 (5f, 2 '65', 1 pen); E McCormack 0–5; D McCormack 0–2; P O'Brien, R Hayes, J Murphy 0–1 each.	Report	E Cloonan 0–6 (5f); D Donohue, D Moran 0–2 each; MJ Quinn, B Higgins, J Rabbitte, B Hanley (line ball) 0–1.	Referee: S Roche (Tipperary)

== Championship statistics ==
=== Top scorers ===
Overall

Rank	Player	Club	Tally	Total	Matches	Average
1	Eoin Larkin	James Stephens	3–33	42	5	8.40
2	Eugene Cloonan	Athenry	3–17	26	3	8.66
3	Ken Dunne	Toomevara	1–20	23	4	5.75
4	Ken McGrath	Mount Sion	2–15	21	3	7.00
5	Paul Graham	O'Donovan Rossa	2–13	19	3	6.66
5	Don Hyland	Carnew Emmets	2–13	19	2	9.50
5	Noel Costello	Portlaoise	1–16	19	2	9.50
5	Keith Higgins	Ballyhaunis	0–19	19	3	6.66
9	Seán Ryan	Mount Sion	5-02	17	3	5.66
9	Eoin McCormack	James Stephens	1–14	17	5	3.40

Single game

Rank	Player	Club	Tally	Total	Opposition
1	Paul Graham	O'Donovan Rossa	2-08	14	Carrickmore
2	Don Hyland	Carnew Emmets	2-07	13	Wolfe Tones
3	Seán Ryan	Mount Sion	4-00	12	Ahane
3	Geoffrey McGonagle	Dungiven	1-09	12	Ballygalget
5	Eugene Cloonan	Athenry	2-05	11	Toomevara
5	Noel Costello	Portlaoise	1-08	11	Castletown-Geoghegan
7	Eoin Larkin	James Stephens	1-07	10	Oulart-the Ballagh
7	Eoin Larkin	James Stephens	1-07	10	UCD
7	Nicky Horan	Kilmessan	0–10	10	Pearse Óg
