= Pa Morrissey =

Irish Gaelic footballer (born 1981)

Personal information
- Native name: Padraig Ó Muireasa (Irish)
- Born: 1981 (age 44–45) Bansha, County Tipperary, Ireland

Sport
- Sport: Gaelic football
- Position: Right wing-back
Club
- Years: Club
- Galtee Rovers
Club titles
- Tipperary titles: 1
Inter-county
- Years: County
- 2005-2008: Tipperary
Inter-county titles
- Munster titles: 0
- All-Irelands: 0
- NFL: 0
- All Stars: 0

Patrick "Pa" Morrissey (born 1981) is an Irish Gaelic footballer who played as a right wing-back for the Tipperary senior team.

Born in Bansha, County Tipperary, Morrissey first arrived on the inter-county scene at the age of twenty when he first linked up with the Tipperary under-21 team as a dual player before later joining the intermediate hurling and junior football sides. He joined the senior football and hurling panels during the 2005 championships. Morrissey immediately became a regular member of the starting fifteen of both teams and won one Tommy Murphy Cup medal.

At club level Morrissey is a one-time championship medallist with Galtee Rovers.

His brother, Colin Morrissey, also represented Tipperary in both hurling and Gaelic football.

Morrissey retired from inter-county football following the conclusion of the 2008 championship.

== Honours ==
=== Player ===
Galtee Rovers

- Tipperary Senior Football Championship (1): 2008
- Tipperary Intermediate Hurling Championship (1): 2001

Tipperary

- Tommy Murphy Cup (1): 2005
- Munster Intermediate Hurling Championship (1): 2002
