= GAA/GPA Hurler of the Year =

Irish sporting award

- Awarded for: Excellence in hurling
- Sponsored by: PwC
- Location: Convention Centre Dublin
- Country: Ireland
- Presented by: Gaelic Athletic Association/Gaelic Players Association
- First award: 1995
- Currently held by: John McGrath
- Website: Broadcast partner

Television/radio coverage
- Network: RTÉ One
- Runtime: 51 minutes

The GAA–GPA All-Star Hurler of the Year is a hurling award presented to the player voted as best in the country by all the players from around Ireland. It began in 1995 and honours the achievements of a hurler of outstanding excellence.

Kilkenny players have won the award 10 out of 29 times, ahead of Limerick with five wins and Clare four times.

The award's youngest winner was Tony Kelly, who won at the age of 19 in 2013. Henry Shefflin and Cian Lynch are the only players to have won the award more than once. The oldest winner is also Henry Shefflin, who was 33 when he won in 2012. Limerick are the only county to have had all three nominees come from the one county in a given year (twice).

In 2011 the Gaelic Athletic Association and the Gaelic Players' Association announced that their respective annual player awards schemes were to merge under the sponsorship of Opel. The first merged awards were presented in 2011.

== Hurler of the Year ==
Bold denotes a player still active at inter-county level.

Year	Winner	County	Club	Nominees	Counties	Clubs
1995	Brian Lohan	Clare	Wolfe Tones			
1996	Martin Storey	Wexford	Oulart-the Ballagh			
1997	Jamesie O'Connor	Clare	St Joseph's Doora-Barefield			
1998	Tony Browne	Waterford	Mount Sion	Seánie McMahon	Clare	St Joseph's Doora-Barefield
1998	Tony Browne	Waterford	Mount Sion	Brian Whelahan	Offaly	Birr
1999	Brian Corcoran	Cork	Erin's Own	D. J. Carey	Kilkenny	Young Irelands
1999	Brian Corcoran	Cork	Erin's Own	Brian Whelahan	Offaly	Birr
2000	D. J. Carey	Kilkenny	Young Irelands			
2001	Tommy Dunne	Tipperary	Toomevara			
2002	Henry Shefflin	Kilkenny	Ballyhale Sharmocks			
2003	J. J. Delaney	Kilkenny	Fenians			
2004	Seán Óg Ó hAilpín	Cork	Na Piarsaigh			
2005	Jerry O'Connor	Cork	Newtownshandrum	John Gardiner	Cork	Na Piarsaigh
2006	Henry Shefflin	Kilkenny	Ballyhale Sharmocks	Donal Óg Cusack	Cork	Cloyne
2007	Dan Shanahan	Waterford	Lismore	Ken McGrath	Waterford	Mount Sion
2007	Dan Shanahan	Waterford	Lismore	Tommy Walsh	Kilkenny	Tullaroan
2008	Eoin Larkin	Kilkenny	James Stephens	Eddie Brennan	Kilkenny	Graigue-Ballycallan
2008	Eoin Larkin	Kilkenny	James Stephens	Eoin Kelly	Waterford	Passage
2009	Tommy Walsh	Kilkenny	Tullaroan	Lar Corbett	Tipperary	Thurles Sarsfields
2009	Tommy Walsh	Kilkenny	Tullaroan	John Mullane	Waterford	De La Salle
2010	Lar Corbett	Tipperary	Thurles Sarsfields	Brendan Maher	Tipperary	Borris-Ileigh
2010	Lar Corbett	Tipperary	Thurles Sarsfields	Michael Fennelly	Kilkenny	Ballyhale Sharmocks
2011	Michael Fennelly	Kilkenny	Ballyhale Sharmocks	Tommy Walsh	Kilkenny	Tullaroan
2011	Michael Fennelly	Kilkenny	Ballyhale Sharmocks	Pádraic Maher	Tipperary	Thurles Sarsfields
2012	Henry Shefflin	Kilkenny	Ballyhale Sharmocks	Paul Murphy	Kilkenny	Danesfort
2012	Henry Shefflin	Kilkenny	Ballyhale Sharmocks	Joe Canning	Galway	Portumna
2013	**Tony Kelly**	Clare	Ballyea	Podge Collins	Clare	Cratloe
2013	**Tony Kelly**	Clare	Ballyea	Anthony Nash	Cork	Kanturk
2014	Richie Hogan	Kilkenny	Danesfort	T. J. Reid	Kilkenny	Ballyhale Shamrocks
2014	Richie Hogan	Kilkenny	Danesfort	Séamus Callanan	Tipperary	Drom-Inch
2015	**T. J. Reid**	Kilkenny	Ballyhale Shamrocks	Richie Hogan	Kilkenny	Danesfort
2015	**T. J. Reid**	Kilkenny	Ballyhale Shamrocks	Séamus Callanan	Tipperary	Drom-Inch
2016	Austin Gleeson	Waterford	Mount Sion	Pádraic Maher	Tipperary	Thurles Sarsfields
2016	Austin Gleeson	Waterford	Mount Sion	Séamus Callanan	Tipperary	Drom-Inch
2017	Joe Canning	Galway	Portumna	Kevin Moran	Waterford	De La Salle
2017	Joe Canning	Galway	Portumna	Jamie Barron	Waterford	The Nire-Fourmilewater
2018	**Cian Lynch**	Limerick	Patrickswell	Pádraic Mannion	Galway	Ahascragh-Fohenagh
2018	**Cian Lynch**	Limerick	Patrickswell	Joe Canning	Galway	Portumna
2019	Séamus Callanan	Tipperary	Drom-Inch	Patrick Horgan	Cork	Glen Rovers
2019	Séamus Callanan	Tipperary	Drom-Inch	T. J. Reid	Kilkenny	Ballyhale Shamrocks
2020	**Gearóid Hegarty**	Limerick	St Patricks	Tony Kelly	Clare	Ballyea
2020	**Gearóid Hegarty**	Limerick	St Patricks	Stephen Bennett	Waterford	Ballysagart
2021	**Cian Lynch**	Limerick	Patrickswell	Kyle Hayes	Limerick	Kildimo-Pallaskenry
2021	**Cian Lynch**	Limerick	Patrickswell	Seán Finn	Limerick	Bruff
2022	**Diarmaid Byrnes**	Limerick	Patrickswell	Barry Nash	Limerick	South Liberties
2022	**Diarmaid Byrnes**	Limerick	Patrickswell	T.J. Reid	Kilkenny	Ballyhale Shamrocks
2023	**Aaron Gillane**	Limerick	Patrickswell	Kyle Hayes	Limerick	Kildimo-Pallaskenry
2023	**Aaron Gillane**	Limerick	Patrickswell	Diarmaid Byrnes	Limerick	Patrickswell
2024	**Shane O'Donnell**	Clare	Éire Óg, Ennis	Darragh Fitzgibbon	Cork	Charleville
2024	**Shane O'Donnell**	Clare	Éire Óg, Ennis	Kyle Hayes	Limerick	Kildimo-Pallaskenry
2025	**John McGrath**	Tipperary	Loughmore–Castleiney	Brian Hayes	Cork	St Finbarr's
2025	**John McGrath**	Tipperary	Loughmore–Castleiney	Jake Morris	Tipperary	Éire Óg, Nenagh

== Breakdown of winners ==
#	Player	No. of wins	Years won	Runners-up	Years runners-up
1	Henry Shefflin	3	2002, 2006, 2012		
2	Cian Lynch	2	2018, 2021		
3	Séamus Callanan	1	2019	3	2014, 2015, 2016
3	T. J. Reid	1	2015	3	2014, 2019, 2022
5	Joe Canning	1	2017	2	2012, 2018
5	Tommy Walsh	1	2009	2	2007, 2011
7	D. J. Carey	1	2000	1	1999
7	Lar Corbett	1	2010	1	2009
7	Richie Hogan	1	2014	1	2015
7	Michael Fennelly	1	2011	1	2010
7	Tony Kelly	1	2013	1	2020
7	Diarmaid Byrnes	1	2022	1	2023
13	John McGrath	1	2025		
13	Shane O'Donnell	1	2024		
13	Aaron Gillane	1	2023		
13	Gearóid Hegarty	1	2020		
13	Austin Gleeson	1	2016		
13	Eoin Larkin	1	2008		
13	Dan Shanahan	1	2007		
13	Jerry O'Connor	1	2005		
13	Seán Óg Ó hAilpín	1	2004		
13	J. J. Delaney	1	2003		
13	Tommy Dunne	1	2001		
13	Brian Corcoran	1	1999		
13	Tony Browne	1	1998		
13	Jamesie O'Connor	1	1997		
13	Martin Storey	1	1996		
13	Brian Lohan	1	1995		
29	Kyle Hayes	0		3	2021, 2023, 2024
30	Pádraic Maher	0		2	2012, 2016
30	Brian Whelehan	0		2	1998, 1999
32	Darragh Fitzgibbon	0		1	2024
32	Barry Nash	0		1	2022
32	Sean Finn	0		1	2021
32	Stephen Bennett	0		1	2020
32	Patrick Horgan	0		1	2019
32	Pádraic Mannion	0		1	2018
32	Jamie Barron	0		1	2017
32	Kevin Moran	0		1	2017
32	Anthony Nash	0		1	2013
32	Podge Collins	0		1	2013
32	Paul Murphy	0		1	2012
32	Brendan Maher	0		1	2010
32	John Mullane	0		1	2009
32	Eddie Brennan	0		1	2008
32	Eoin Kelly	0		1	2008
32	Ken McGrath	0		1	2007
32	Dónal Óg Cusack	0		1	2006
32	John Gardiner	0		1	2005
32	Seánie McMahon	0		1	1998

== Winners by county ==
County	Number of wins	Winning years
Kilkenny	10	2000, 2002, 2003, 2006, 2008, 2009, 2011, 2012, 2014, 2015
Limerick	6	2018, 2020, 2021, 2022, 2023
Clare	4	1995, 1997, 2013, 2024
Tipperary	4	2001, 2010, 2019, 2025
Cork	3	1999, 2004, 2005
Waterford	3	1998, 2007, 2016
Wexford	1	1996
Galway	1	2017
