= All-Ireland Senior Hurling Championship Final referees =

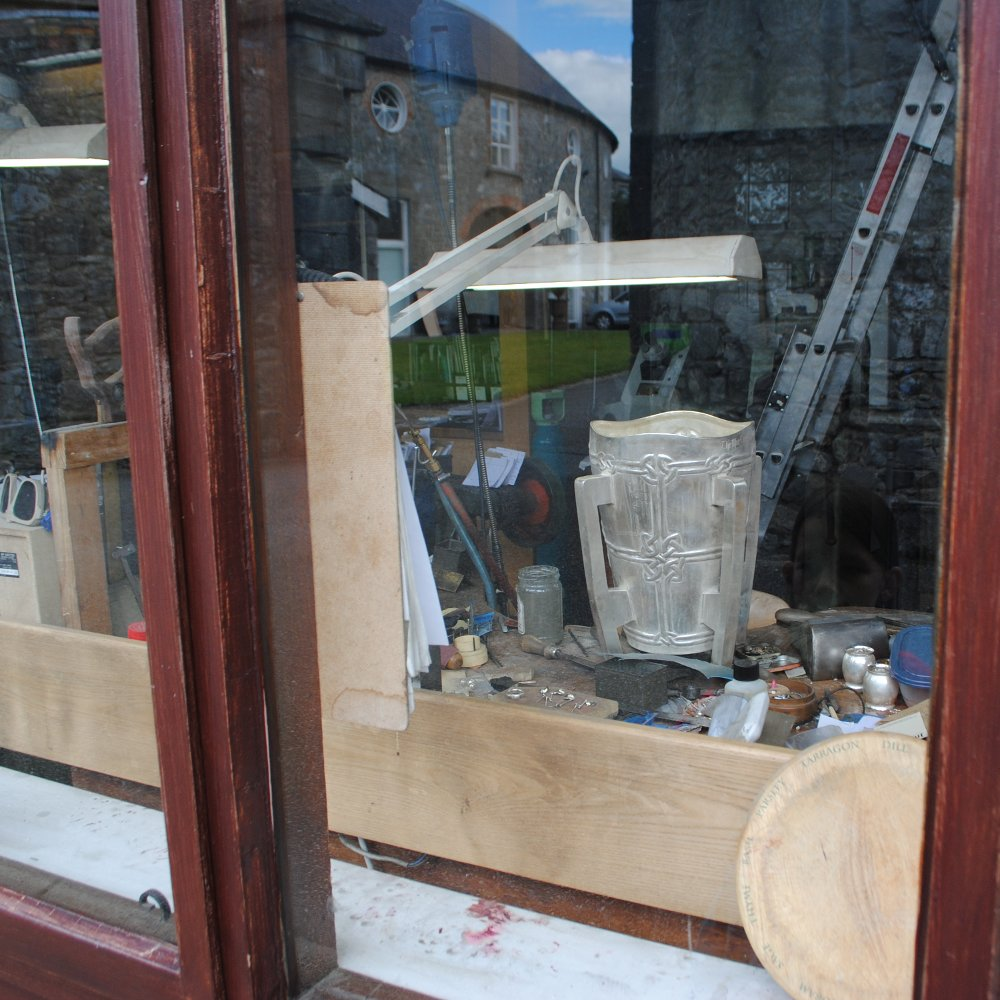
The Liam MacCarthy Cup

In hurling, the All-Ireland Senior Hurling Championship Final, the deciding match of the All-Ireland Senior Hurling Championship competition, is considered the highest honour for referees to be appointed to officiate.

The most recent final (2024) was refereed by Johnny Murphy. The 2021 final was refereed by Fergal Horgan, with James Owens on standby; Sean Stack as linesman; Liam Gordon on the sideline; and three umpires from Horgan's club Knockavilla Donaskeigh Kickhams and one umpire from Cashel King Cormacs.

== Selection ==
Men who referee a final that ends in a draw cannot also referee the replay. This rule was highlighted in 2019 when David Gough — thought by consensus to have had a good game — was replaced by Conor Lane for the replay. Colm O'Rourke in the Sunday Independent column, "The GAA's view that the referee of a drawn game cannot take the replay defies common sense and logic. Why disqualify a referee when he has done a good job? If the referee is not up to it then certainly he should be left off, but when there is almost universal agreement that he is the best referee in the country then give him all the big games and replays too. The players want the best referees".

Referees are chosen by the Gaelic Athletic Association (GAA) for their impartiality and their assessed performance scores over that championship season. A clue to the identity of the final referee may be found among those chosen to referee the All-Ireland quarter-finals. In recent years, a referee who has overseen an All-Ireland semi-final is never chosen for the final. However, he has tended to have refereed a quarter-final.

When the decision is made, the identity of the referee chosen is revealed following the All-Ireland semi-finals and ahead of the final. A period of media attention may ensue, sometimes even before the announcement has been made. It can be a referee's lifetime goal to get this game.

== Referees ==
=== Pre-1923 ===
Year	Referee	Referee's club	Co.	Ref(s)
1887	Pauric White		Offaly	
1889	P. Tobin		Dublin	
1890	John Sheehy		Limerick	
1891	P. Tobin		Dublin	
1892	Dan Fraher		Waterford	
1893	J. J. Kenny		Dublin	
1894	J. J. Kenny		Dublin	
1895	J. J. Kenny		Dublin	
1896	D. Wood		Dublin	
1897	J. J. McCabe		Dublin	
1898	J. J. McCabe		Dublin	
1899	A. McKeogh		Dublin	
1900	John McCarthy		Kilkenny	
1901	John McCarthy		Kilkenny	
1902	L. J. O'Toole		Dublin	
1903	John McCarthy		Kilkenny	
1904	M. F. Crowe			
1905	M. F. Crowe			
1906	T. Irwin		Cork	
1907	M. F. Crowe			
1908 (draw)	T. Irwin		Cork	
1908 (replay)	J. McCarthy			
1909	M. F. Crowe			
1910	M. F. Crowe			
1911	?			
1912	M. F. Crowe			
1913	M. F. Crowe			
1914	John Lalor			
1915	Willie Walsh		Waterford	
1916	Willie Walsh		Waterford	
1917	Willie Walsh		Waterford	
1918	Willie Walsh		Waterford	
1919	Willie Walsh		Waterford	
1920	T. McGrath		Clare	
1921	Willie Walsh		Waterford	
1922	Pat Dunphy		Laois	

=== 1923 to 1969: Introduction of the Liam MacCarthy Cup ===
Year	Referee	Referee's club	Co.	Ref(s)
1923	Pat Kennefick		Cork	
1924	Pádraig Ó Caoimh		Cork	
1925	Pat McCullagh		Wexford	
1926	Pat McCullagh		Wexford	
1927	Dinny Lanigan		Limerick	
1928	John Roberts		Kilkenny	
1929	Seán Robbins		Offaly	
1930	Stephen Jordan		Galway	
1931 (draw)	Seán Robbins		Offaly	
1931 (replay)	Seán Robbins		Offaly	
1931 (2nd replay)	Willie Walsh		Waterford	
1932	Seán Robbins		Offaly	
1933	Stephen Jordan		Galway	
1934 (draw)	Stephen Jordan		Galway	
1934 (replay)	Stephen Jordan		Galway	
1935	Tommy Daly		Clare	
1936	Jim O'Regan		Cork	
1937	Jim Flaherty		Offaly	
1938	Ignatius Harney		Galway	
1939	Jim Flaherty		Offaly	
1940	John Joe Callanan		Tipperary	
1941	Bill O'Donnell		Tipperary	
1942	Mick Hennessy		Clare	
1943	J. J. Stuart		Dublin	
1944	Mick Hennessy		Clare	
1945	Vin Baston		Waterford	
1946	Jim Flaherty		Offaly	
1947	Phil Purcell		Tipperary	
1948	Con Murphy		Cork	
1949	M. J. Flaherty		Galway	
1950	Con Murphy		Cork	
1951	Bill O'Donoghue		Limerick	
1952	Bill O'Donoghue		Limerick	
1953	Paddy Connell		Offaly	
1954	Jack Mulcahy		Kilkenny	
1955	Bob Stakelum		Tipperary	
1956	T. O'Sullivan			
1957	Steve Gleeson			
1958	Matt Spain			
1959 (draw)	Gerry Fitzgerald			
1959 (replay)	Gerry Fitzgerald			
1960	John Dowling		Offaly	
1961	Gerry Fitzgerald			
1962	John Dowling		Offaly	
1963	Jimmy Hatton		Wicklow	
1964	Aubrey Higgins			
1965	Mick Hayes			
1966	Jimmy Hatton		Wicklow	
1967	Mick Hayes			
1968	John Dowling		Offaly	
1969	Seán O'Connor		Limerick	

=== 1970 to 1996 ===
Year	Referee	Referee's club	Co.	Ref(s)
1970	Jimmy Hatton		Wicklow	
1971	Frank Murphy		Cork	
1972	Mick Spain		Offaly	
1973	Mick Slattery		Clare	
1974	John Moloney		Tipperary	
1975	Seán O'Connor		Limerick	
1976	Paddy Johnston		Kilkenny	
1977	Seán O'Grady			
1978	Jimmy Rankins			
1979	Ger Ryan			
1980	Noel O'Donoghue			
1981	Frank Murphy		Cork	
1982	Noel O'Donoghue			
1983	Neilly Duggan			
1984	Paschal Long			
1985	Ger Ryan			
1986	J. F. Bailey		Dublin	
1987	Terence Murray		Limerick	
1988	Gerry Kirwan		Offaly	
1989	Pat Delaney		Laois	
1990	John Moore		Waterford	
1991	Willie Horgan		Cork	
1992	Dickie Murphy		Wexford	
1993	Terence Murray		Limerick	
1994	Willie Barrett		Tipperary	
1995	Dickie Murphy		Wexford	
1996	Pat Horan		Offaly	

=== 1997 to present ===
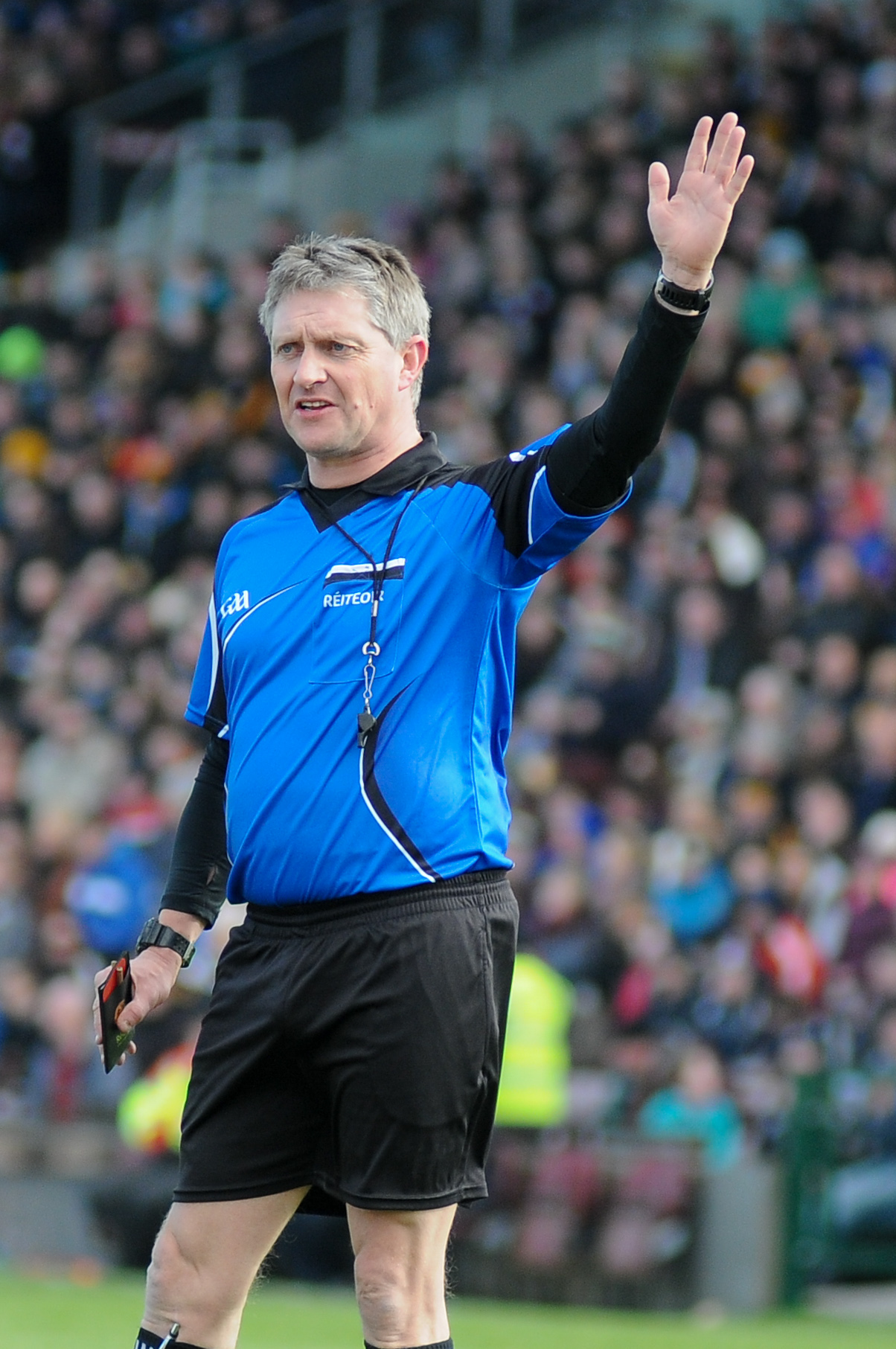
Barry Kelly refereed the 2006, 2008, 2012 and 2014 finals.

Year	Referee	Referee's club	Co.	Standby referee	Other linesman	Sideline official	Ref(s)
1997	Dickie Murphy		Wexford				
1998	Dickie Murphy		Wexford				
1999	Pat O'Connor		Limerick				
2000	Willie Barrett		Tipperary				
2001	Pat O'Connor		Limerick				
2002	Aodán Mac Suibhne		Dublin				
2003	Pat O'Connor		Limerick				
2004	Aodán Mac Suibhne		Dublin				
2005	Séamus Roche		Tipperary				
2006	Barry Kelly	St Oliver Plunkett's	Westmeath				
2007	Diarmuid Kirwan		Cork				
2008	Barry Kelly	St Oliver Plunkett's	Westmeath				
2009	Diarmuid Kirwan		Cork				
2010	Michael Wadding		Waterford				
2011	Brian Gavin		Offaly				
2012 (draw)	Barry Kelly	St Oliver Plunkett's	Westmeath				
2012 (replay)	James McGrath	Turin	Westmeath				
2013 (draw)	Brian Gavin		Offaly				
2013 (replay)	James McGrath	Turin	Westmeath				
2014 (draw)	Barry Kelly	St Oliver Plunkett's	Westmeath				
2014 (replay)	Brian Gavin		Offaly				
2015	James Owens		Wexford				
2016	Brian Gavin		Offaly				
2017	Fergal Horgan		Tipperary				
2018	James Owens		Wexford				
2019	James Owens		Wexford				
2020	Fergal Horgan		Tipperary				
2021	Fergal Horgan		Tipperary	James Owens	Seán Stack	Liam Gordon	
2022	Colm Lyons		Cork	Liam Gordon	Paud O’Dwyer	Micheal Kennedy	
2023	John Keenan		Wicklow	Liam Gordon	James Owens	Shane Hynes	
2024	Johnny Murphy		Limerick	Liam Gordon	Michael Kennedy	Chris Mooney	ref>
2025	Liam Gordon		Galway	Seán Stack	Thomas Walsh	Colm McDonald	

== By county ==
Since 1997

Co.	Number of finals	Years
Westmeath	6	2006, 2008, 2012 (draw), 2012 (replay), 2013 (replay), 2014 (draw)
Wexford	5	1997, 1998, 2015, 2018, 2019
Tipperary	5	2000, 2005, 2017, 2020, 2021
Limerick	4	1999, 2001, 2003, 2024
Offaly	4	2011, 2013 (draw), 2014 (replay), 2016
Cork	3	2007, 2009, 2022
Dublin	2	2002, 2004
Waterford	1	2010
Wicklow	1	2023

== Referees with more than one final ==
Bold = referee still active at inter-county level

Referee	Number of finals	Years
M. F. Crowe	7	1904, 1905, 1907, 1909, 1910, 1912, 1913
Willie Walsh	7	1915, 1916, 1917, 1918, 1919, 1921, 1931 (2nd replay)
J. McCarthy	4	1900, 1901, 1903, 1908 (replay)
Seán Robbins	4	1929, 1931 (draw), 1931 (replay), 1932
Stephen Jordan	4	1930, 1933, 1934 (draw), 1934 (replay)
Dickie Murphy	4	1992, 1995, 1997, 1998
Barry Kelly	4	2006, 2008, 2012 (draw), 2014 (draw)
Brian Gavin	4	2011, 2013 (draw), 2014 (replay), 2016
J. J. Kenny	3	1893, 1894, 1895
Jim Flaherty	3	1937, 1939, 1946
Gerry Fitzgerald	3	1959 (draw), 1959 (replay), 1961
John Dowling	3	1960, 1962, 1968
Jimmy Hatton	3	1963, 1966, 1970
Pat O'Connor	3	1999, 2001, 2003
**James Owens**	3	2015, 2018, 2019
**Fergal Horgan**	3	2017, 2020, 2021
J. J. McCabe	2	1897, 1898
P. Tobin	2	1889, 1891
Tom Irwin	2	1906, 1908 (draw)
Pat McCullagh	2	1925, 1926
Mick Hennessy	2	1942, 1944
Con Murphy	2	1948, 1950
Bill O'Donoghue	2	1951, 1952
Mick Hayes	2	1965, 1967
Seán O'Connor	2	1969, 1975
Noel O'Donoghue	2	1980, 1982
George Ryan	2	1979, 1985
Aodán Mac Suibhne	2	2002, 2004
Diarmuid Kirwan	2	2007, 2009
James McGrath	2	2012 (replay), 2013 (replay)

- Pat Dunphy (1922) has the distinction of also taking charge of the 1922 All-Ireland Senior Hurling Championship Final in the same year.
- John Dowling (1960) has the distinction of also taking charge of the 1960 All-Ireland Senior Football Championship Final in the same year.
- Jimmy Hatton (1966) has the distinction of also taking charge of the 1966 All-Ireland Senior Football Championship Final in the same year.

== See also ==
- FA Cup Final referees, the closest the English have
