= List of All-Ireland Senior Hurling Championship finals =

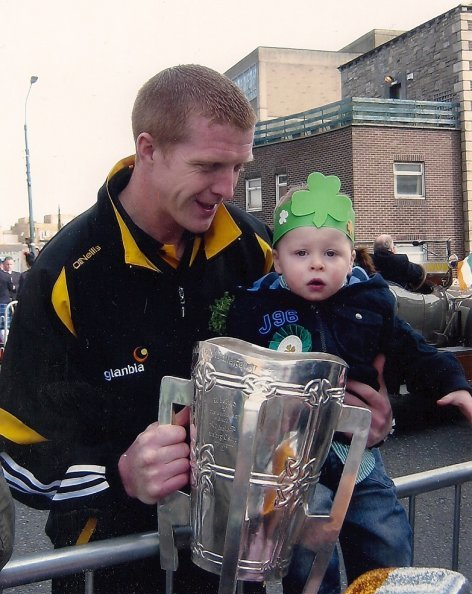
Henry Shefflin (Kilkenny) with the Liam MacCarthy Cup, awarded to the winners of the All-Ireland Senior Hurling Championship

The final of the All-Ireland Senior Hurling Championship is the ultimate match in the annual hurling competition organised since 1887 by the Gaelic Athletic Association (GAA). Contested by the top hurling teams in Ireland, the tournament has taken place every year, except in 1888, when the competition was not played due to a tour of the United States by would-be competitors. In 2012 the All-Ireland Senior Hurling Championship Final was listed in second place by CNN in its "10 sporting events you have to see live", after the Olympic Games and ahead of both the FIFA World Cup and UEFA European Football Championship. The most recent All-Ireland Hurling Final was held at Croke Park, Dublin, on 19 July 2026, and saw Limerick beat Galway by 11 points (final score: Limerick 1-29 to Galway: 1–18).

The final, held in mid-late summer serves as the culmination of a series of games played during the summer months, and the results determine which county's team receives the Liam MacCarthy Cup. The Championship was initially a straight knockout competition open only to the champions of each of the four provinces of Ireland. During the 1990s the competition was expanded, firstly incorporating a "back-door system" and later a round-robin group phase involving more games. In the present format, the championship begins in late April with provincial championships held in Leinster and Munster. The Munster and Leinster champions gain automatic admission to the All-Ireland Senior Hurling Championship semi-finals, where they are joined by the two winners of the All-Ireland Senior Hurling Championship qualifiers via two lone quarter-finals.

Thirteen teams currently participate in the Championship, the most dominant teams coming from the provinces of Leinster and Munster. Kilkenny, Cork and Tipperary are considered "the big three" of hurling. Between them, these teams have won 94 out of 136 (69%) championships completed during its history — though Limerick have had huge success in recent years, winning five of the 6 finals in 2018-2023.

In all, the title has been won by 13 different teams, 10 of which have won the title more than once. The all-time record-holders are Kilkenny, who won their 36th title in 2015. The current champions are Limerick.

== List of finals ==
| Year | Winning County | Score | Losing County | Score | Venue | Winning captain | Losing captain |
|---|---|---|---|---|---|---|---|
| 2026; Details | Limerick | 1-29 (32) | Galway | 1-18 (21) | Croke Park, Dublin | Cian Lynch | Darren Morrissey |
| 2025; Details | Tipperary | 3-27 (36) | Cork | 1-18 (21) | Croke Park, Dublin | Ronan Maher | Robert Downey |
| 2024; Details | Clare | 3-29 (38) | Cork | 1-34 (37) | Croke Park, Dublin | Tony Kelly | Seán O'Donoghue |
| 2023; Details | Limerick | 0-30 (30) | Kilkenny | 2-15 (21) | Croke Park, Dublin | Cian Lynch | Eoin Cody |
| 2022; Details | Limerick | 1-31 (34) | Kilkenny | 2-26 (32) | Croke Park, Dublin | Declan Hannon | Richie Reid |
| 2021; Details | Limerick | 3-32 (41) | Cork | 1-22 (25) | Croke Park, Dublin | Declan Hannon | Patrick Horgan |
| 2020; Details | Limerick | 0-30 (30) | Waterford | 0-19 (19) | Croke Park, Dublin | Declan Hannon | Conor Prunty |
| 2019; Details | Tipperary | 3-25 (34) | Kilkenny | 0-20 (20) | Croke Park, Dublin | Séamus Callanan | TJ Reid |
| 2018; Details | Limerick | 3-16 (25) | Galway | 2-18 (24) | Croke Park, Dublin | Declan Hannon | Joe Canning |
| 2017; Details | Galway | 0-26 (26) | Waterford | 2-17 (23) | Croke Park, Dublin | David Burke | Kevin Moran |
| 2016; Details | Tipperary | 2-29 (35) | Kilkenny | 2-20 (26) | Croke Park, Dublin | Brendan Maher | Shane Prendergast |
| 2015; Details | Kilkenny | 1-22 (25) | Galway | 1-18 (21) | Croke Park, Dublin | Joey Holden | David Collins |
| 2014; Details | Kilkenny | 2-17 (23) | Tipperary | 2-14 (20) | Croke Park, Dublin | Lester Ryan | Brendan Maher |
| Drawn match | Kilkenny | 3-22 (31) | Tipperary | 1-28 (31) | Croke Park, Dublin | | |
| 2013; Details | Clare | 5-16 (31) | Cork | 3-16 (25) | Croke Park, Dublin | Patrick Donnellan | Pa Cronin |
| Drawn match | Clare | 0-25 (25) | Cork | 3-16 (25) | Croke Park, Dublin | | |
| 2012; Details | Kilkenny | 3-22 (31) | Galway | 3-11 (20) | Croke Park, Dublin | Eoin Larkin | Fergal Moore |
| Drawn match | Kilkenny | 0-19 (19) | Galway | 2-13 (19) | Croke Park, Dublin | | |
| 2011; Details | Kilkenny | 2-17 (23) | Tipperary | 1-16 (19) | Croke Park, Dublin | Brian Hogan | Eoin Kelly |
| 2010; Details | Tipperary | 4-17 (29) | Kilkenny | 1-18 (21) | Croke Park, Dublin | Eoin Kelly | T.J. Reid |
| 2009; Details | Kilkenny | 2-22 (28) | Tipperary | 0-23 (23) | Croke Park, Dublin | Michael Fennelly | Willie Ryan |
| 2008; Details | Kilkenny | 3-30 (39) | Waterford | 1-13 (16) | Croke Park, Dublin | James Fitzpatrick | Michael Walsh |
| 2007; Details | Kilkenny | 2-19 (25) | Limerick | 1-15 (18) | Croke Park, Dublin | Henry Shefflin | Damien Reale |
| 2006; Details | Kilkenny | 1-16 (19) | Cork | 1-13 (16) | Croke Park, Dublin | Jackie Tyrrell | Pat Mulcahy |
| 2005; Details | Cork | 1-21 (24) | Galway | 1-16 (19) | Croke Park, Dublin | Seán Óg Ó hAilpín | Liam Donoghue |
| 2004; Details | Cork | 0-17 (17) | Kilkenny | 0-09 (9) | Croke Park, Dublin | Ben O'Connor | Martin Comerford |
| 2003; Details | Kilkenny | 1-14 (17) | Cork | 1-11 (14) | Croke Park, Dublin | D.J. Carey | Alan Browne |
| 2002; Details | Kilkenny | 2-20 (26) | Clare | 0-19 (19) | Croke Park, Dublin | Andy Comerford | Brian Lohan |
| 2001; Details | Tipperary | 2-18 (24) | Galway | 2-15 (21) | Croke Park, Dublin | Tommy Dunne | Liam Hodgins |
| 2000; Details | Kilkenny | 5-15 (30) | Offaly | 1-14 (17) | Croke Park, Dublin | Willie O'Connor | Johnny Dooley |
| 1999; Details | Cork | 0-13 (13) | Kilkenny | 0-12 (12) | Croke Park, Dublin | Mark Landers | Denis Byrne |
| 1998; Details | Offaly | 2-16 (22) | Kilkenny | 1-13 (16) | Croke Park, Dublin | Hubert Rigney | Tom Hickey |
| 1997; Details | Clare | 0-20 (20) | Tipperary | 2-13 (19) | Croke Park, Dublin | Anthony Daly | Conor Gleeson |
| 1996; Details | Wexford | 1-13 (16) | Limerick | 0-14 (14) | Croke Park, Dublin | Martin Storey | Ciarán Carey |
| 1995; Details | Clare | 1-13 (16) | Offaly | 2-08 (14) | Croke Park, Dublin | Anthony Daly | Johnny Pilkington |
| 1994; Details | Offaly | 3-16 (25) | Limerick | 2-13 (19) | Croke Park, Dublin | Martin Hanamy | Gary Kirby |
| 1993; Details | Kilkenny | 2-17 (23) | Galway | 1-15 (18) | Croke Park, Dublin | Eddie O'Connor | Michael McGrath |
| 1992; Details | Kilkenny | 3-10 (19) | Cork | 1-12 (15) | Croke Park, Dublin | Liam Fennelly | Ger FitzGerald |
| 1991; Details | Tipperary | 1-16 (19) | Kilkenny | 0-15 (15) | Croke Park, Dublin | Declan Carr | Christy Heffernan |
| 1990; Details | Cork | 5-15 (30) | Galway | 2-21 (27) | Croke Park, Dublin | Tomás Mulcahy | Joe Cooney |
| 1989; Details | Tipperary | 4-24 (36) | Antrim | 3-09 (18) | Croke Park, Dublin | Bobby Ryan | Ciarán Barr |
| 1988; Details | Galway | 1-15 (18) | Tipperary | 0-14 (14) | Croke Park, Dublin | Conor Hayes | Nicky English |
| 1987; Details | Galway | 1-12 (15) | Kilkenny | 0-09 (9) | Croke Park, Dublin | Conor Hayes | Paddy Prendergast |
| 1986; Details | Cork | 4-13 (25) | Galway | 2-15 (21) | Croke Park, Dublin | Tom Cashman | Noel Lane |
| 1985; Details | Offaly | 2-11 (17) | Galway | 1-12 (15) | Croke Park, Dublin | Pat Fleury | Michael Connolly |
| 1984; Details | Cork | 3-16 (25) | Offaly | 1-12 (15) | Semple Stadium, Thurles | John Fenton | Pat Fleury |
| 1983; Details | Kilkenny | 2-14 (20) | Cork | 2-12 (18) | Croke Park, Dublin | Liam Fennelly | Jimmy Barry-Murphy |
| 1982; Details | Kilkenny | 3-18 (27) | Cork | 1-13 (16) | Croke Park, Dublin | Brian Cody | Jimmy Barry-Murphy |
| 1981; Details | Offaly | 2-12 (18) | Galway | 0-15 (15) | Croke Park, Dublin | Pádraig Horan | Seán Silke |
| 1980; Details | Galway | 2-15 (21) | Limerick | 3-09 (18) | Croke Park, Dublin | Joe Connolly | Seán Foley |
| 1979; Details | Kilkenny | 2-12 (18) | Galway | 1-08 (11) | Croke Park, Dublin | Ger Fennelly | Joe McDonagh |
| 1978; Details | Cork | 1-15 (18) | Kilkenny | 2-08 (14) | Croke Park, Dublin | Charlie McCarthy | Ger Henderson |
| 1977; Details | Cork | 1-17 (20) | Wexford | 3-08 (17) | Croke Park, Dublin | Martin O'Doherty | Tony Doran |
| 1976; Details | Cork | 2-21 (27) | Wexford | 4-11 (23) | Croke Park, Dublin | Ray Cummins | Tony Doran |
| 1975 ^{2} Details | Kilkenny | 2-22 (28) | Galway | 2-10 (16) | Croke Park, Dublin | Billy Fitzpatrick | John Connolly |
| 1974; Details | Kilkenny | 3-19 (28) | Limerick | 1-13 (16) | Croke Park, Dublin | Nicky Orr | Seán Foley |
| 1973; Details | Limerick | 1-21 (24) | Kilkenny | 1-14 (17) | Croke Park, Dublin | Éamonn Grimes | Pat Delaney |
| 1972; Details | Kilkenny | 3-24 (33) | Cork | 5-11 (26) | Croke Park, Dublin | Noel Skehan | Frank Norberg |
| 1971; Details | Tipperary | 5-17 (32) | Kilkenny | 5-14 (29) | Croke Park, Dublin | Tadhg O'Connor | Pat Henderson |
| 1970 ^{3} Details | Cork | 6-21 (39) | Wexford | 5-10 (25) | Croke Park, Dublin | Paddy Barry | Michael Collins |
| 1969; Details | Kilkenny | 2-15 (21) | Cork | 2-09 (15) | Croke Park, Dublin | Eddie Keher | Denis Murphy |
| 1968; Details | Wexford | 5-08 (23) | Tipperary | 3-12 (21) | Croke Park, Dublin | Dan Quigley | Mick Roche |
| 1967; Details | Kilkenny | 3-08 (17) | Tipperary | 2-07 (13) | Croke Park, Dublin | Jim Treacy | Mick Roche |
| 1966; Details | Cork | 3-09 (18) | Kilkenny | 1-10 (13) | Croke Park, Dublin | Gerald McCarthy | Jim Lynch |
| 1965; Details | Tipperary | 2-16 (22) | Wexford | 0-10 (10) | Croke Park, Dublin | Jimmy Doyle | Tom Neville |
| 1964; Details | Tipperary | 5-13 (28) | Kilkenny | 2-08 (14) | Croke Park, Dublin | Mick Murphy | Seán Buckley |
| 1963; Details | Kilkenny | 4-17 (29) | Waterford | 6-08 (26) | Croke Park, Dublin | Séamus Cleere | Joe Condon |
| 1962; Details | Tipperary | 3-10 (19) | Wexford | 2-11 (17) | Croke Park, Dublin | Jimmy Doyle | Billy Rackard |
| 1961; Details | Tipperary | 0-16 (16) | Dublin | 1-12 (15) | Croke Park, Dublin | Matt Hassett | Noel Drumgoole |
| 1960; Details | Wexford | 2-15 (21) | Tipperary | 0-11 (11) | Croke Park, Dublin | Nick O'Donnell | Tony Wall |
| 1959; Details | Waterford | 3-12 (21) | Kilkenny | 1-10 (13) | Croke Park, Dublin | Frankie Walsh | Seán Clohessey |
| Drawn match | Waterford | 1-17 (20) | Kilkenny | 5-05 (20) | Croke Park, Dublin | | |
| 1958; Details | Tipperary | 4-09 (21) | Galway | 2-05 (11) | Croke Park, Dublin | Tony Wall | Seán Cullinane |
| 1957; Details | Kilkenny | 4-10 (22) | Waterford | 3-12 (21) | Croke Park, Dublin | Mickey Kelly | Phil Grimes |
| 1956; Details | Wexford | 2-14 (20) | Cork | 2-08 (14) | Croke Park, Dublin | Jim English | Tony O'Shaughnessy |
| 1955; Details | Wexford | 3-13 (22) | Galway | 2-08 (14) | Croke Park, Dublin | Nick O'Donnell | Jimmy Duggan |
| 1954; Details | Cork | 1-09 (12) | Wexford | 1-06 (9) | Croke Park, Dublin | Christy Ring | Padge Kehoe |
| 1953; Details | Cork | 3-03 (12) | Galway | 0-08 (8) | Croke Park, Dublin | Christy Ring | Mick Burke |
| 1952; Details | Cork | 2-14 (20) | Dublin | 0-07 (7) | Croke Park, Dublin | Paddy Barry | Jim Prior |
| 1951; Details | Tipperary | 7-07 (28) | Wexford | 3-09 (18) | Croke Park, Dublin | Jimmy Finn | Nicky Rackard |
| 1950; Details | Tipperary | 1-09 (12) | Kilkenny | 1-08 (11) | Croke Park, Dublin | Seán Kenny | Mick Kenny |
| 1949; Details | Tipperary | 3-11 (20) | Laois | 0-03 (3) | Croke Park, Dublin | Pat Stakelum | Paddy Ruschitzko |
| 1948; Details | Waterford | 6-07 (25) | Dublin | 4-02 (14) | Croke Park, Dublin | Jim Ware | Frank Cummins |
| 1947; Details | Kilkenny | 0-14 (14) | Cork | 2-07 (13) | Croke Park, Dublin | Dan Kennedy | Seán Condon |
| 1946; Details | Cork | 7-05 (26) | Kilkenny | 3-08 (17) | Croke Park, Dublin | Christy Ring | Jack Mulcahy |
| 1945; Details | Tipperary | 5-06 (21) | Kilkenny | 3-06 (15) | Croke Park, Dublin | John Maher | Peter Blanchfield |
| 1944; Details | Cork | 2-13 (19) | Dublin | 1-02 (5) | Croke Park, Dublin | Seán Condon | Mick Butler |
| 1943; Details | Cork | 5-16 (31) | Antrim | 0-04 (4) | Croke Park, Dublin | Mick Kennefick | Jimmy Walsh |
| 1942; Details | Cork | 2-14 (20) | Dublin | 3-04 (13) | Croke Park, Dublin | Jack Lynch | Frank White |
| 1941; Details | Cork | 5-11 (26) | Dublin | 0-06 (6) | Croke Park, Dublin | Connie Buckley | Eddie Wade |
| 1940; Details | Limerick | 3-07 (16) | Kilkenny | 1-07 (10) | Croke Park, Dublin | Mick Mackey | Jim Langton |
| 1939; Details | Kilkenny | 2-07 (13) | Cork | 3-03 (12) | Croke Park, Dublin | Jimmy Walsh | Jack Lynch |
| 1938; Details | Dublin | 2-05 (11) | Waterford | 1-06 (9) | Croke Park, Dublin | Mick Daniels | Mick Hickey |
| 1937; Details | Tipperary | 3-11 (20) | Kilkenny | 0-03 (3) | FitzGerald Stadium, Killarney | Jimmy Lanigan | Jack Duggan |
| 1936; Details | Limerick | 5-06 (21) | Kilkenny | 1-05 (8) | Croke Park, Dublin | Mick Mackey | Paddy Larkin |
| 1935; Details | Kilkenny | 2-05 (11) | Limerick | 2-04 (10) | Croke Park, Dublin | Lory Meagher | Timmy Ryan |
| 1934; Details | Limerick | 3-04 (13) | Dublin | 2-06 (12) | Croke Park, Dublin | Timmy Ryan | Stephen Feeny |
| Drawn match | Limerick | 2-07 (13) | Dublin | 3-04 (13) | Croke Park, Dublin | | |
| 1933; Details | Kilkenny | 1-07 (10) | Limerick | 0-06 (6) | Croke Park, Dublin | Ned Doyle | Micky Fitzgibbon |
| 1932; Details | Kilkenny | 3-03 (12) | Clare | 2-03 (9) | Croke Park, Dublin | Jimmy Walsh | John Joe 'Goggles' Doyle |
| 1931; Details | Cork | 5-08 (23) | Kilkenny | 3-04 (13) | Croke Park, Dublin | Eudie Coughlan | Lory Meagher |
| 1930; Details | Tipperary | 2-07 (13) | Dublin | 1-03 (6) | Croke Park, Dublin | John Joe Callinan | Jimmy Walsh |
| 1929; Details | Cork | 4-09 (21) | Galway | 1-03 (6) | Croke Park, Dublin | Dinny Barry-Murphy | Junior Mahony |
| 1928; Details | Cork | 6-12 (28) | Galway | 1-00 (3) | Croke Park, Dublin | Seán Óg Murphy | Jim Power |
| 1927; Details | Dublin | 4-08 (20) | Cork | 1-03 (6) | Croke Park, Dublin | Mick Gill | Seán Óg Murphy |
| 1926; Details | Cork | 4-06 (18) | Kilkenny | 2-00 (6) | Croke Park, Dublin | Seán Óg Murphy | Dick Grace |
| 1925; Details | Tipperary | 5-06 (21) | Galway | 1-05 (8) | Croke Park, Dublin | Johnny Leahy | Andy Kelly |
| 1924; Details | Dublin | 5-03 (18) | Galway | 2-06 (12) | Croke Park, Dublin | Frank Wall | Mick Kenny |
| 1923; Details | Galway | 7-03 (24) | Limerick | 4-05 (17) | Croke Park, Dublin | Mick Kenny | Paddy McInerney |
| 1922; Details | Kilkenny | 5-03 (18) | Tipperary | 2-06 (12) | Croke Park, Dublin | Wattie Dunphy | Johnny Leahy |
| 1921; Details | Limerick | 8-05 (29) | Dublin | 3-02 (11) | Croke Park, Dublin | Bob McConkey | Bob Mockler |
| 1920; Details | Dublin | 4-09 (21) | Cork | 4-03 (15) | Croke Park, Dublin | Bob Mockler | Dick O'Gorman |
| 1919; Details | Cork | 6-04 (22) | Dublin | 2-04 (10) | Croke Park, Dublin | Jimmy Kennedy | Charlie Stuart |
| 1918; Details | Limerick | 9-05 (32) | Wexford | 1-03 (6) | Croke Park, Dublin | Willie Hough | Mike Cummins |
| 1917; Details | Dublin | 5-04 (19) | Tipperary | 4-02 (14) | Croke Park, Dublin | John Ryan | Johnny Leahy |
| 1916; Details | Tipperary | 5-04 (19) | Kilkenny | 3-02 (11) | Croke Park, Dublin | Johnny Leahy | Sim Walton |
| 1915; Details | Laois | 6-02 (20) | Cork | 4-01 (13) | Croke Park, Dublin | Jack Finlay | Connie Sheehan |
| 1914; Details | Clare | 5-01 (16) | Laois | 1-00 (3) | Croke Park, Dublin | Amby Power | Jack Carroll |
| 1913; Details | Kilkenny | 2-04 (10) | Tipperary | 1-02 (5) | Jones' Road, Dublin | Dick Walsh | Patrick 'Wedger' Meagher |
| 1912; Details | Kilkenny | 2-01 (7) | Cork | 1-03 (6) | Jones' Road, Dublin | Sim Walton | Barry Murphy |
| 1911^{[a]} Details | Kilkenny | 3-03 (12) | Tipperary | 1-01 (4) | Fraher Field, Dungarvan | Sim Walton | |
| 1910; Details | Wexford | 7-00 (21) | Limerick | 6-02 (20) | Jones' Road, Dublin | Dick Doyle | John "Tyler" Mackey |
| 1909; Details | Kilkenny | 4-06 (18) | Tipperary | 0-12 (12) | Cork Athletic Grounds | Dick Walsh | Tom Semple |
| 1908; Details | Tipperary | 2-05 (11) | Dublin | 1-08 (11) | Croke Park, Dublin | | |
| 1908; Details | Tipperary | 3-15 (24) | Dublin | 1-05 (8) | Geraldine Park, Athy | Tom Semple | Jack Grace |
| 1907; Details | Kilkenny | 3-12 (21) | Cork | 4-08 (20) | Fraher Field, Dungarvan | Dick Walsh | Jamesy Kelleher |
| 1906; Details | Tipperary | 3-16 (25) | Dublin | 3-08 (17) | St. James' Park, Kilkenny | Tom Semple | Danny McCormack |
| 1905^{[b]} Details | Cork | 5-10 (25) | Kilkenny | 3-12 (21) | Fraher Field, Dungarvan | | |
| 1905^{[b]} Details | Kilkenny | 7-07 (28) | Cork | 2-09 (15) | Tipperary | D.J. Stapleton | Christy Young |
| 1904; Details | Kilkenny | 1-09 (12) | Cork | 1-08 (11) | Carrick-on-Suir | Jer Doheny | Dan Harrington |
| 1903; Details | Cork | 3-16 (25) | London | 1-01 (4) | Fraher Field, Dungarvan | Steva Riordan | Paddy King |
| 1902; Details | Cork | 3-13 (22) | London | 0-00 (0) | Cork Athletic Grounds, Cork | Jamesy Kelleher | Jim Nestor |
| 1901; Details | London | 1-05 (8) | Cork | 0-04 (4) | Jones' Road | Jack Coughlan | Paddy Cantillon |
| 1900; Details | Tipperary | 3-13 (22) | London | 0-06 (6) | Jones' Road | Ned Hayes | Dan Horgan |
| 1899^{[c]} Details | Tipperary | 3-12 (21) | Wexford | 1-04 (7) | Jones' Road | Tom Condon | James Furlong |
| 1898; Details | Tipperary | 7-13 (34) | Kilkenny | 3-10 (19) | Jones' Road | Mikey Maher | Ned Hennessy |
| 1897; Details | Limerick | 3-04 (13) | Kilkenny | 2-04 (10) | Jones' Road | Denis Grimes | Jackie Walsh |
| 1896; Details | Tipperary | 8-14 (38) | Dublin | 0-04 (4) | Jones' Road | Mikey Maher | Pat Buckley |
| 1895; Details | Tipperary | 6-08 (38) | Kilkenny | 1-00 (5) | Jones' Road | Mikey Maher | James Grace |
| 1894; Details | Cork | 5-20 (45) | Dublin | 2-00 (10) | Clonturk Park, Drumcondra | Stephen Hayes | John McCabe |
| 1893; Details | Cork | 6-08 (38) | Kilkenny | 0-02 (2) | Phoenix Park | John 'Curtis' Murphy | Dan Whelan |
| 1892^{[d]} Details | Cork | 2-04 (14) | Dublin | 1-01 (6) | Clonturk Park, Drumcondra | Bill O'Callaghan | Pat Egan |
| 1891; Details | Kerry | 2-03 | Wexford ÷ | 1-05 | Clonturk Park, Drumcondra | John Mahony | Nick Daly |
| 1890^{[e]} Details | Cork | 1-06 | Wexford | 2-02 | Clonturk Park, Drumcondra | Dan Lane | Nick Daly |
| 1889; Details | Dublin | 5-04 | Clare | 1-06 | Pond Field, Inchicore | Nicholas O'Shea | John Considine |
| 1888^{[f]} | Cork v. Kilkenny — not played | | | | | | |
| 1887; Details | Tipperary | 1-01 | Galway | 0-00 | Birr Sportsfield, Birr | Jim Stapleton | Pat Madden |

== Footnotes ==
a. Limerick refused to play in Thurles after the original fixture on 18 February 1911 in Cork was postponed owing to the state of pitch. Kilkenny were awarded the All-Ireland title, and Tipperary were nominated to play in the All-Ireland final in Limerick's absence.
b. A refixture of the All-Ireland Final was needed following an objection and a counter-objection.
c. The 1899 final was abandoned due to darkness: Tipperary were awarded the title.
d. The 1892 final was abandoned after Dublin walked off the field with ten minutes remaining after Cork were awarded a disputed goal: Cork were awarded the title.
e. The 1890 final was abandoned after Cork walked off the field to protest the unduly rough play by Wexford's team. Cork were awarded the title.
f. The 1888 Championship was unfinished owing to the American Invasion Tour of the United States by hurlers, footballers and athletes.

== Man of the match ==
- 1968: Mick Roche, refused the prize
- 1969:
- 1972: Eddie Keher
- 1975:
- 1976:
- 1978:
- 1979:
- 1980: Michael Conneely
- 1981:
- 1982:
- 1983:
- 1984:
- 1985:
- 1986:
- 1987:
- 1988:
- 1989: Nicky English
- 1990: Tomás Mulcahy
- 1991: Pat Fox
- 1992: Pat O'Neill
- 1993: Pádraig Kelly
- 1994: Brian Whelahan
- 1995: Seánie McMahon
- 1996: Liam Dunne
- 1997: Jamesie O'Connor
- 1998: Brian Whelahan
- 1999: Brian Corcoran
- 2000: D. J. Carey
- 2001: Tommy Dunne
- 2002: Henry Shefflin
- 2003: Noel Hickey
- 2004: Niall McCarthy
- 2005: Ben O'Connor
- 2006: Aidan Fogarty
- 2007: Eddie Brennan
- 2008: Brian Cody
- 2009: P. J. Ryan
- 2010: Lar Corbett
- 2011: J. J. Delaney
- 2012 (draw): Iarla Tannian
- 2012 (replay): Walter Walsh
- 2013 (draw): Conor Ryan
- 2013 (replay): Shane O'Donnell
- 2014 (draw): Richie Hogan
- 2014 (replay): Kieran Joyce
- 2015: Michael Fennelly
- 2016: Séamus Callanan
- 2017: David Burke
- 2018: Kyle Hayes
- 2019: Noel McGrath
- 2020: Gearóid Hegarty
- 2021: Cian Lynch
- 2022: Gearóid Hegarty
- 2023: Peter Casey
- 2024: Tony Kelly
- 2025: Ronan Maher
- 2026: Cathal O'Neill

== See also ==
- List of All-Ireland Senior Hurling Championship final goalscorers
- All-Ireland Senior Hurling Championship Final referees
- List of All-Ireland Senior Hurling Championship semi-finals
- List of All-Ireland Senior Football Championship finals
