= List of All-Ireland Senior Hurling Championship winners =

The All-Ireland Senior Hurling Championship is an annual hurling competition established by the Gaelic Athletic Association in 1887. The All-Ireland Championship is open to the top hurling teams in Ireland, with 14 teams currently participating. Originally, only the county club champions of their respective county championships were allowed to participate. However, this was changed in the 1890s when teams involving non-county championship-winning players began to emerge. Tipperary, represented by Thurles Sarsfields, won the inaugural championship, beating Galway, represented by Meelick, in the 1887 final.

The prize for the All-Ireland champions is the Liam MacCarthy Cup.

Kilkenny hold the record for the most victories, winning the competition thirty-six times since its inception. They have also won the competition the most times in-a-row, winning it four times from 2006 to 2009, a record they share with Cork who won it from 1941 to 1944 and Limerick from 2020 to 2023. Kilkenny have also been runners-up the most times, losing the final twenty-five times. The province of Munster has provided the most champions, with seventy-one wins between all six counties.

Tipperary beat Cork in the 2025 final at Croke Park by a scoreline of 3-27 to 1-18.

== Finals ==
Season	Province	Winners	Score	Runners-up	Province	Venue	Attendance	Notes
1887	Munster	Tipperary (1)	1-1 : 0-1	Galway	Connacht	Birr Sportsfield, Birr	5,000	
1888		n/a		n/a				(Note: The Championship was left unfinished due to many of the players travelling to the United States in an attempt to raise money for a revival of the Tailteann Games)
1889	Leinster	Dublin (1)	5-1 : 1-6	Clare	Munster	St. Patrick's GAA Field, Dublin	1,500	
1890	Munster	Cork (1)	1-6 : 2-2	Wexford	Leinster	Clonturk Park, Dublin	1,000	(Note: The match was abandoned by the Cork team due to rough play by their opponents, with Wexford leading 2-2 to 1-6 (at the time, one goal equalled five points, so Wexford led 12 to 11). Cork were later awarded the title)
1891	Munster	Kerry (1)	2-3 : 1-5	Wexford	Leinster	Clonturk Park, Dublin	2,000	
1892	Munster	Cork (2)	2-3 : 1-5	Dublin	Leinster	Clonturk Park, Dublin	5,000	(Note: Cork led by 2-3 to 1-5 when the Dublin side left the field in protest at a disputed goal, leaving the match unfinished. As a result, Cork were awarded the title)
1893	Munster	Cork (3)	6-8 : 0-2	Kilkenny	Leinster	Phoenix Park, Dublin	1,000	
1894	Munster	Cork (4)	5-20 : 2-0	Dublin	Leinster	Clonturk Park, Dublin	2,000	
1895	Munster	Tipperary (2)	6-8 : 1-10	Kilkenny	Leinster	Jones' Road, Dublin	8,000	
1896	Munster	Tipperary (3)	8-14 : 0-4	Dublin	Leinster	Jones' Road, Dublin	3,500	
1897	Munster	Limerick (1)	3-4 : 2-4	Kilkenny	Leinster	Tipperary GAA Field, Tipperary	5,000	
1898	Munster	Tipperary (4)	7-13 : 3-10	Kilkenny	Leinster	Jones' Road, Dublin	2,500	
1899	Munster	Tipperary (5)	3-12 : 1-4	Wexford	Leinster	Jones' Road, Dublin	3,500	
1900	Munster	Tipperary (6)	2-5 : 0-6	London	Britain	Jones' Road, Dublin	8,000	
1901	Britain	London (1)	1-5 : 0-4	Cork	Munster	Jones' Road, Dublin		
1902	Munster	Cork (5)	3-13 : 0-0	London	Britain	Cork Athletic Grounds, Cork	8,000	
1903	Munster	Cork (6)	3-16 : 1-1	London	Britain	Jones' Road, Dublin		
1904	Leinster	Kilkenny (1)	1-9 : 1-8	Cork	Munster	Maurice Davin's land, Carrick-on-Suir		
1905 (R)	Leinster	Kilkenny (2)	3-12 : 5-10; 7-7 : 2-9	Cork	Munster	Fraher Field, Dungarvan		(Note: Cork won the initial game, but after an objection was raised about Cork keeper Daniel McCarthy being a reservist for the British Army, a replay was ordered, won by Kilkenny)
1906	Munster	Tipperary (7)	3-16 : 3-8	Dublin	Leinster	Nowlan Park, Kilkenny	5,000	
1907	Leinster	Kilkenny (3)	3-12 : 4-8	Cork	Munster	Fraher Field, Dungarvan	15,000	
1908	Munster	Tipperary (8)	3-15 : 1-5	Dublin	Leinster	Geraldine Park, Athy		
1909	Leinster	Kilkenny (4)	4-6 : 0-12	Tipperary	Munster	Cork Athletic Grounds, Cork	11,000	
1910	Leinster	Wexford (1)	7-0 : 6-2	Limerick	Munster	Jones' Road, Dublin		
1911	Leinster	Kilkenny (5)	3-3 : 1-1	Tipperary	Munster	Fraher Field, Dungarvan		
1912	Leinster	Kilkenny (6)	2-1 : 1-3	Cork	Munster	Jones' Road, Dublin	18,000	
1913	Leinster	Kilkenny (7)	2-4 : 1-2	Tipperary	Munster	Croke Park, Dublin	12,000	
1914	Munster	Clare (1)	5-1 : 1-0	Laois	Leinster	Croke Park, Dublin		
1915	Leinster	Laois (1)	6-2 : 4-1	Cork	Munster	Croke Park, Dublin		
1916	Munster	Tipperary (9)	5-4 : 3-2	Kilkenny	Leinster	Croke Park, Dublin	5,000	
1917	Leinster	Dublin (2)	5-4 : 4-2	Tipperary	Munster	Croke Park, Dublin		
1918	Munster	Limerick (2)	9-5 : 1-3	Wexford	Leinster	Croke Park, Dublin		
1919	Munster	Cork (7)	6-4 : 2-4	Dublin	Leinster	Croke Park, Dublin	14,300	
1920	Leinster	Dublin (3)	4-9 : 4-3	Cork	Munster	Croke Park, Dublin	22,000	
1921	Munster	Limerick (3)	8-5 : 3-2	Dublin	Leinster	Croke Park, Dublin	19,000	
1922	Leinster	Kilkenny (8)	4-2 : 2-6	Tipperary	Munster	Croke Park, Dublin	26,119	
1923	Connacht	Galway (1)	7-3 : 4-5	Limerick	Munster	Croke Park, Dublin	7,000	
1924	Leinster	Dublin (4)	5-3 : 2-6	Galway	Connacht	Croke Park, Dublin	9,000	
1925	Munster	Tipperary (10)	5-6 : 1-5	Galway	Connacht	Croke Park, Dublin	20,000	
1926	Munster	Cork (8)	4-6 : 2-0	Kilkenny	Leinster	Croke Park, Dublin	26,829	
1927	Leinster	Dublin (5)	4-8 : 1-3	Cork	Munster	Croke Park, Dublin	23,824	
1928	Munster	Cork (9)	6-12 : 1-0	Galway	Connacht	Croke Park, Dublin	15,259	
1929	Munster	Cork (10)	4-9 : 1-3	Galway	Connacht	Croke Park, Dublin	14,000	
1930	Munster	Tipperary (11)	2-7 : 1-3	Dublin	Leinster	Croke Park, Dublin	21,730	
1931 (R) (R)	Munster	Cork (11)	1-6 : 1-6; 2-5 : 2-5; 5-8 : 3-4	Kilkenny	Leinster	Croke Park, Dublin	26,460; 33,124; 31,935	
1932	Leinster	Kilkenny (9)	3-3 : 2-3	Clare	Munster	Croke Park, Dublin	34,392	
1933	Leinster	Kilkenny (10)	1-7 : 0-6	Limerick	Munster	Croke Park, Dublin	45,176	
1934 (R)	Munster	Limerick (4)	2-7 : 3-4; 3-4 : 2-6	Dublin	Leinster	Croke Park, Dublin	34,867; 30,250	
1935	Leinster	Kilkenny (11)	2-5 : 2-4	Limerick	Munster	Croke Park, Dublin	46,591	
1936	Munster	Limerick (5)	5-6 : 1-5	Kilkenny	Leinster	Croke Park, Dublin	51,235	
1937	Munster	Tipperary (12)	3-11 : 0-3	Kilkenny	Leinster	FitzGerald Stadium, Killarney	67,629	(Note: Newly built FitzGerald Stadium in Killarney hosted the All-Ireland final due to a builders' strike at Croke Park)
1938	Leinster	Dublin (6)	2-7 : 3-3	Waterford	Munster	Croke Park, Dublin	37,129	
1939	Leinster	Kilkenny (12)	2-7 : 3-3	Cork	Munster	Croke Park, Dublin	39,302	
1940	Munster	Limerick (6)	3-7 : 1-7	Kilkenny	Leinster	Croke Park, Dublin	49,260	
1941	Munster	Cork (12)	5-11 : 0-6	Dublin	Leinster	Croke Park, Dublin	26,150	
1942	Munster	Cork (13)	2-14 : 3-4	Dublin	Leinster	Croke Park, Dublin	27,313	
1943	Munster	Cork (14)	5-16 : 0-4	Antrim	Ulster	Croke Park, Dublin	48,843	
1944	Munster	Cork (15)	2-13 : 1-2	Dublin	Leinster	Croke Park, Dublin	26,896	
1945	Munster	Tipperary (13)	5-6 : 3-6	Kilkenny	Leinster	Croke Park, Dublin	69,459	
1946	Munster	Cork (16)	7-5 : 3-8	Kilkenny	Leinster	Croke Park, Dublin	64,415	
1947	Leinster	Kilkenny (13)	0-14 : 2-7	Cork	Munster	Croke Park, Dublin	61,510	
1948	Munster	Waterford (1)	6-7 : 4-2	Dublin	Leinster	Croke Park, Dublin	61,742	
1949	Munster	Tipperary (14)	3-11 : 0-3	Laois	Leinster	Croke Park, Dublin	67,168	
1950	Munster	Tipperary (15)	1-9 : 1-8	Kilkenny	Leinster	Croke Park, Dublin	67,629	
1951	Munster	Tipperary (16)	7-7 : 3-9	Wexford	Leinster	Croke Park, Dublin	68,515	
1952	Munster	Cork (17)	2-14 : 0-7	Dublin	Leinster	Croke Park, Dublin	71,195	
1953	Munster	Cork (18)	3-3 : 0-8	Galway	Connacht	Croke Park, Dublin	71,195	
1954	Munster	Cork (19)	1-9 : 1-6	Wexford	Leinster	Croke Park, Dublin	84,856	
1955	Leinster	Wexford (2)	3-13 : 2-8	Galway	Connacht	Croke Park, Dublin	72,854	
1956	Leinster	Wexford (3)	2-14 : 2-8	Cork	Munster	Croke Park, Dublin	83,096	
1957	Leinster	Kilkenny (14)	4-10 : 3-12	Waterford	Munster	Croke Park, Dublin	70,594	
1958	Munster	Tipperary (17)	4-9 : 2-5	Galway	Connacht	Croke Park, Dublin	47,276	
1959 (R)	Munster	Waterford (2)	1-17 : 5-5; 3-12 : 1-10	Kilkenny	Leinster	Croke Park, Dublin	73,707; 77,285	
1960	Leinster	Wexford (4)	2-15 : 0-11	Tipperary	Munster	Croke Park, Dublin	77,154	
1961	Munster	Tipperary (18)	0-16 : 1-12	Dublin	Leinster	Croke Park, Dublin	67,866	
1962	Munster	Tipperary (19)	3-10 : 2-11	Wexford	Leinster	Croke Park, Dublin	75,039	
1963	Leinster	Kilkenny (15)	4-17 : 6-8	Waterford	Munster	Croke Park, Dublin	73,123	
1964	Munster	Tipperary (20)	5-13 : 2-8	Kilkenny	Leinster	Croke Park, Dublin	71,282	
1965	Munster	Tipperary (21)	2-16 : 0-10	Wexford	Leinster	Croke Park, Dublin	67,498	
1966	Munster	Cork (20)	3-9 : 1-10	Kilkenny	Leinster	Croke Park, Dublin	68,249	
1967	Leinster	Kilkenny (16)	3-8 : 2-7	Tipperary	Munster	Croke Park, Dublin	64,241	
1968	Leinster	Wexford (5)	5-8 : 3-12	Tipperary	Munster	Croke Park, Dublin	63,461	
1969	Leinster	Kilkenny (17)	2-15 : 2-9	Cork	Munster	Croke Park, Dublin	66,844	
1970	Munster	Cork (21)	6-21 : 5-10	Wexford	Leinster	Croke Park, Dublin	65,062	
1971	Munster	Tipperary (22)	5-17 : 5-14	Kilkenny	Leinster	Croke Park, Dublin	61,393	
1972	Leinster	Kilkenny (18)	3-24 : 5-11	Cork	Munster	Croke Park, Dublin	66,137	
1973	Munster	Limerick (7)	1-21 : 1-14	Kilkenny	Leinster	Croke Park, Dublin	59,009	
1974	Leinster	Kilkenny (19)	3-19 : 1-13	Limerick	Munster	Croke Park, Dublin	62,071	
1975	Leinster	Kilkenny (20)	2-22 : 2-10	Galway	Connacht	Croke Park, Dublin	63,711	
1976	Munster	Cork (22)	2-21 : 4-11	Wexford	Leinster	Croke Park, Dublin	62,684	
1977	Munster	Cork (23)	1-17 : 3-8	Wexford	Leinster	Croke Park, Dublin	63,198	
1978	Munster	Cork (24)	1-15 : 2-8	Kilkenny	Leinster	Croke Park, Dublin	64,155	
1979	Leinster	Kilkenny (21)	2-12 : 1-8	Galway	Connacht	Croke Park, Dublin	53,535	
1980	Connacht	Galway (2)	2-15 : 3-9	Limerick	Munster	Croke Park, Dublin	64,895	
1981	Leinster	Offaly (1)	2-12 : 0-15	Galway	Connacht	Croke Park, Dublin	71,348	
1982	Leinster	Kilkenny (22)	3-18 : 1-13	Cork	Munster	Croke Park, Dublin	59,550	
1983	Leinster	Kilkenny (23)	2-14 : 2-12	Cork	Munster	Croke Park, Dublin	58,381	
1984	Munster	Cork (25)	3-16 : 1-12	Offaly	Leinster	Semple Stadium, Thurles	59,814	(Note: The centenary-year All-Ireland final was played in Semple Stadium as a gesture to the town where the GAA was founded)
1985	Leinster	Offaly (2)	2-11 : 1-12	Galway	Connacht	Croke Park, Dublin	61,451	
1986	Munster	Cork (26)	4-13 : 2-15	Galway	Connacht	Croke Park, Dublin	63,451	
1987	Connacht	Galway (3)	1-12 : 0-9	Kilkenny	Leinster	Croke Park, Dublin	63,596	
1988	Connacht	Galway (4)	1-15 : 0-14	Tipperary	Munster	Croke Park, Dublin	63,545	
1989	Munster	Tipperary (23)	4-24 : 3-9	Antrim	Ulster	Croke Park, Dublin	65,496	
1990	Munster	Cork (27)	5-15 : 2-21	Galway	Connacht	Croke Park, Dublin	63,954	
1991	Munster	Tipperary (24)	1-16 : 1-15	Kilkenny	Leinster	Croke Park, Dublin	64,500	
1992	Leinster	Kilkenny (24)	3-10 : 1-12	Cork	Munster	Croke Park, Dublin	64,534	
1993	Leinster	Kilkenny (25)	2-17 : 1-15	Galway	Connact	Croke Park, Dublin	63,460	
1994	Leinster	Offaly (3)	3-16 : 2-13	Limerick	Munster	Croke Park, Dublin	54,458	
1995	Munster	Clare (2)	1-13 : 2-8	Offaly	Leinster	Croke Park, Dublin	65,092	
1996	Leinster	Wexford (6)	1-13 : 0-14	Limerick	Munster	Croke Park, Dublin	65,849	
1997	Munster	Clare (3)	0-20 : 2-13	Tipperary	Munster	Croke Park, Dublin	65,575	
1998	Leinster	Offaly (4)	2-16 : 1-13	Kilkenny	Leinster	Croke Park, Dublin	65,491	
1999	Munster	Cork (28)	0-13 : 0-12	Kilkenny	Leinster	Croke Park, Dublin	62,989	
2000	Leinster	Kilkenny (26)	5-15 : 1-14	Offaly	Leinster	Croke Park, Dublin	61,493	
2001	Munster	Tipperary (25)	2-18 : 2-15	Galway	Connacht	Croke Park, Dublin	68,515	
2002	Leinster	Kilkenny (27)	2-20 : 0-19	Clare	Munster	Croke Park, Dublin	76,254	
2003	Leinster	Kilkenny (28)	1-14 : 1-11	Cork	Munster	Croke Park, Dublin	79,383	
2004	Munster	Cork (29)	0-17 : 0-9	Kilkenny	Leinster	Croke Park, Dublin	78,212	
2005	Munster	Cork (30)	1-21 : 1-16	Galway	Connacht	Croke Park, Dublin	82,275	
2006	Leinster	Kilkenny (29)	1-16 : 1-13	Cork	Munster	Croke Park, Dublin	82,275	
2007	Leinster	Kilkenny (30)	2-19 : 1-15	Limerick	Munster	Croke Park, Dublin	82,127	
2008	Leinster	Kilkenny (31)	3-30 : 1-13	Waterford	Munster	Croke Park, Dublin	82,186	
2009	Leinster	Kilkenny (32)	2-22 : 0-23	Tipperary	Munster	Croke Park, Dublin	82,106	
2010	Munster	Tipperary (26)	4-17 : 1-18	Kilkenny	Leinster	Croke Park, Dublin	81,765	
2011	Leinster	Kilkenny (33)	2-17 : 1-16	Tipperary	Munster	Croke Park, Dublin	81,214	
2012 (R)	Leinster	Kilkenny (34)	0-19 : 2:13; 3-22 : 3-11	Galway	Connacht	Croke Park, Dublin	81,932; 82,274	
2013 (R)	Munster	Clare (4)	0-25 : 3-16; 5-16 : 3-16	Cork	Munster	Croke Park, Dublin	81,651; 82,276	
2014 (R)	Leinster	Kilkenny (35)	3-22 : 1-28; 2-17 : 2-14	Tipperary	Munster	Croke Park, Dublin	82,179; 81,753	
2015	Leinster	Kilkenny (36)	1-22 : 1-18	Galway	Connacht	Croke Park, Dublin	82,300	
2016	Munster	Tipperary (27)	2-29 : 2-20	Kilkenny	Leinster	Croke Park, Dublin	82,300	
2017	Connacht	Galway (5)	0-26 : 2-17	Waterford	Munster	Croke Park, Dublin	82,300	
2018	Munster	Limerick (8)	3-16 : 2-18	Galway	Connacht	Croke Park, Dublin	82,300	
2019	Munster	Tipperary (28)	3-25 : 0-20	Kilkenny	Leinster	Croke Park, Dublin	82,300	
2020	Munster	Limerick (9)	0-30 : 0-19	Waterford	Munster	Croke Park, Dublin	0	(Note: No supporters were permitted into Croke Park due to the COVID-19 pandemic in the Republic of Ireland)
2021	Munster	Limerick (10)	3-32 : 1-22	Cork	Munster	Croke Park, Dublin	40,000	(Note: Croke Park was reduced to half capacity due to the COVID-19 pandemic in the Republic of Ireland)
2022	Munster	Limerick (11)	1-31 : 2-26	Kilkenny	Leinster	Croke Park, Dublin	82,300	
2023	Munster	Limerick (12)	0-30 : 2-15	Kilkenny	Leinster	Croke Park, Dublin	82,300	
2024	Munster	Clare (5)	3-29 : 1-34	Cork	Munster	Croke Park, Dublin	82,300	
2025	Munster	Tipperary (29)	3-27 : 1-18	Cork	Munster	Croke Park, Dublin	82,300	
2026	Munster	Limerick (13)	1-29 : 1-18	Galway	Connaught	Croke Park, Dublin	82,300	

== See also ==
- List of All-Ireland Senior Football Championship finals
