= List of All-Ireland Senior Hurling Championship final goalscorers =

The following is a partial list of goalscorers in All-Ireland Senior Hurling Championship finals. See List of FIFA World Cup final goalscorers a similar list but in soccer not hurling.

Scoring in Gaelic games: Most scores are points but there are goals too.

For a team to score more than three goals in a final is a rarity, occurring in 2000 and 2010. When Lar Corbett (for Tipp, 2010) scored a hat-trick, only Eddie O'Brien (for Cork, 1970) had done it in a final. But the 2013 replay had Clare scoring five goals, including a Shane O'Donnell hat-trick.

The last final to finish goalless was in 2020.

== Finals goalscorers ==
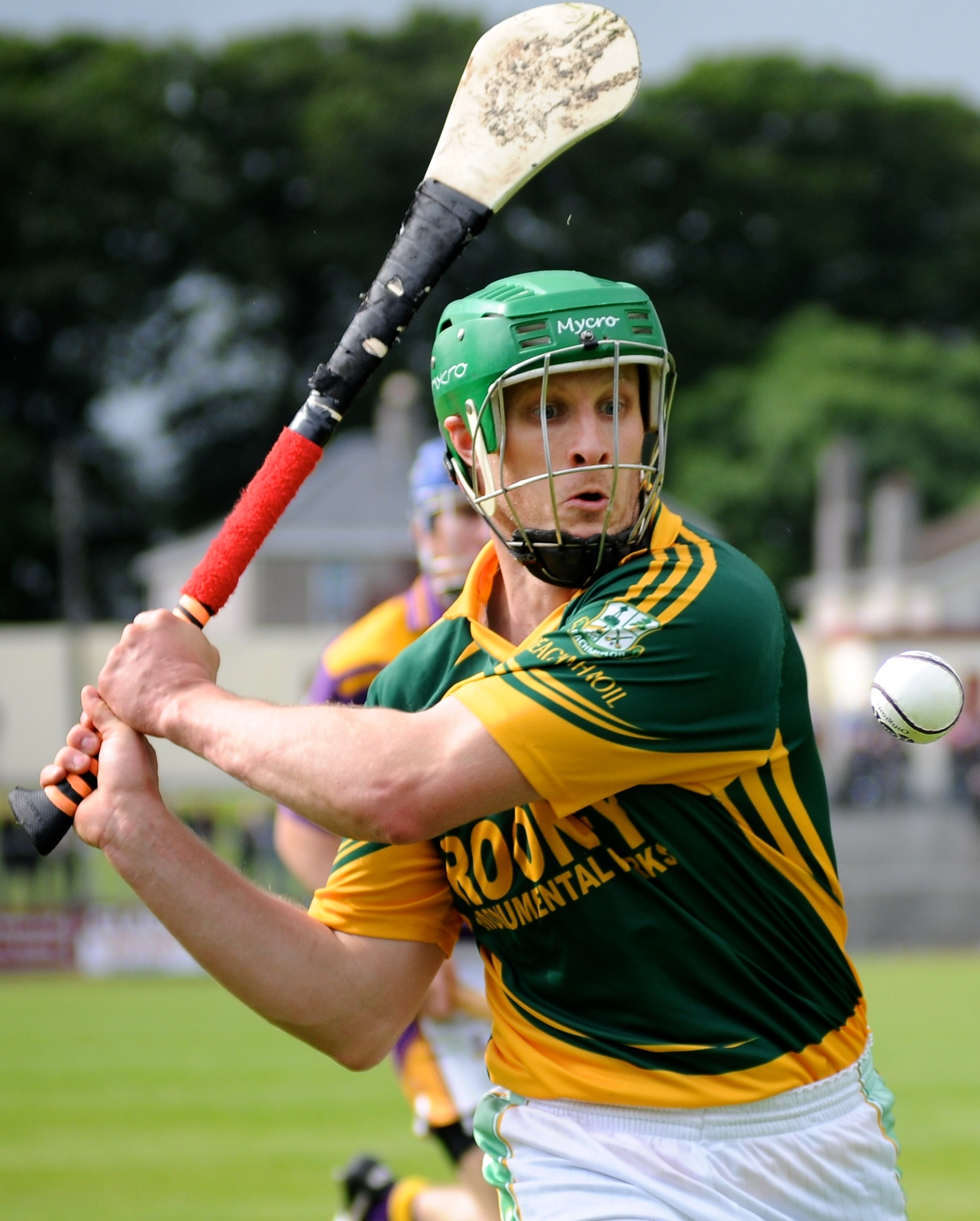
Fergal Healy scored a goal in the 2001 final.

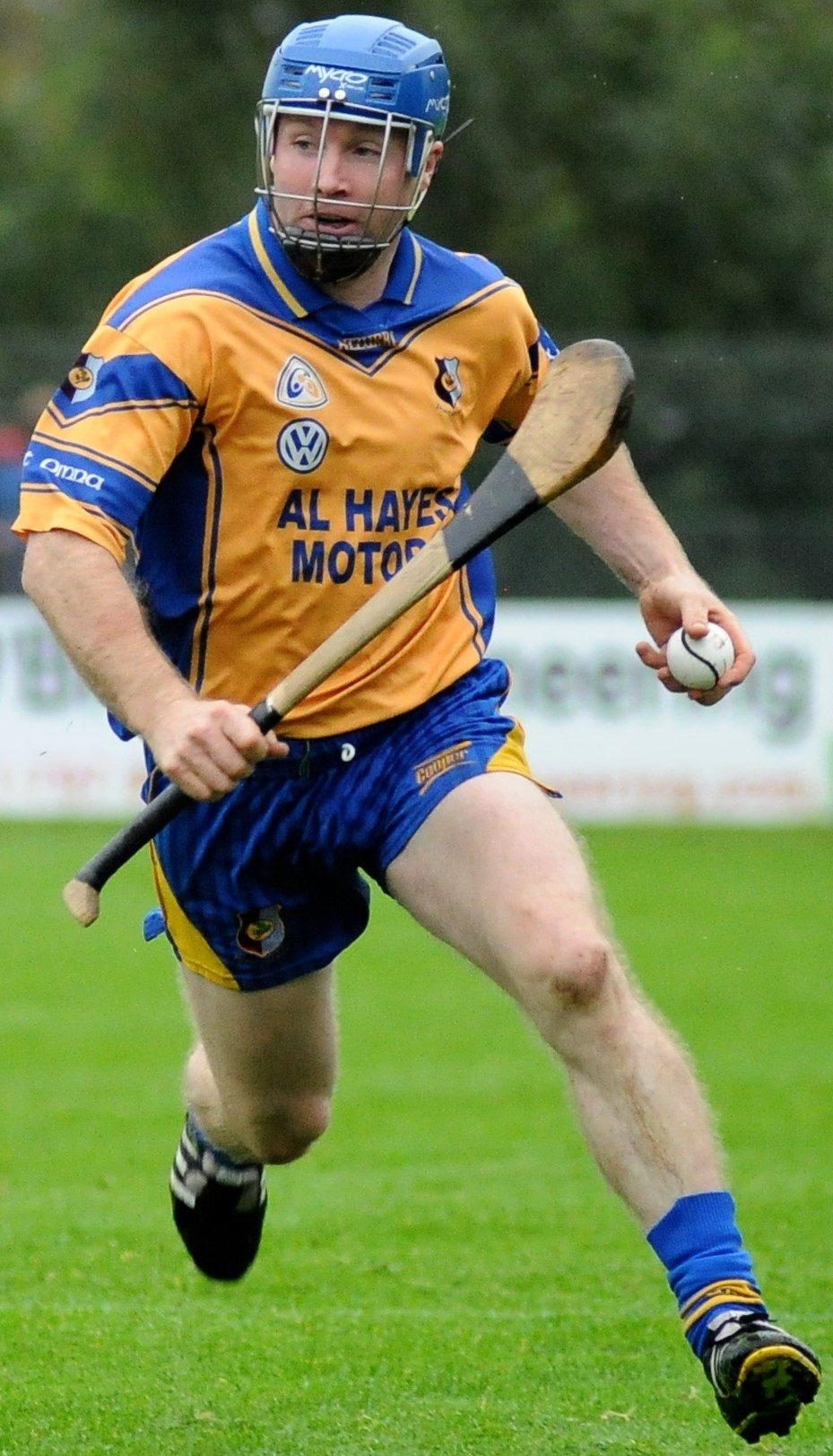
Damien Hayes scored a goal in the 2005 final.

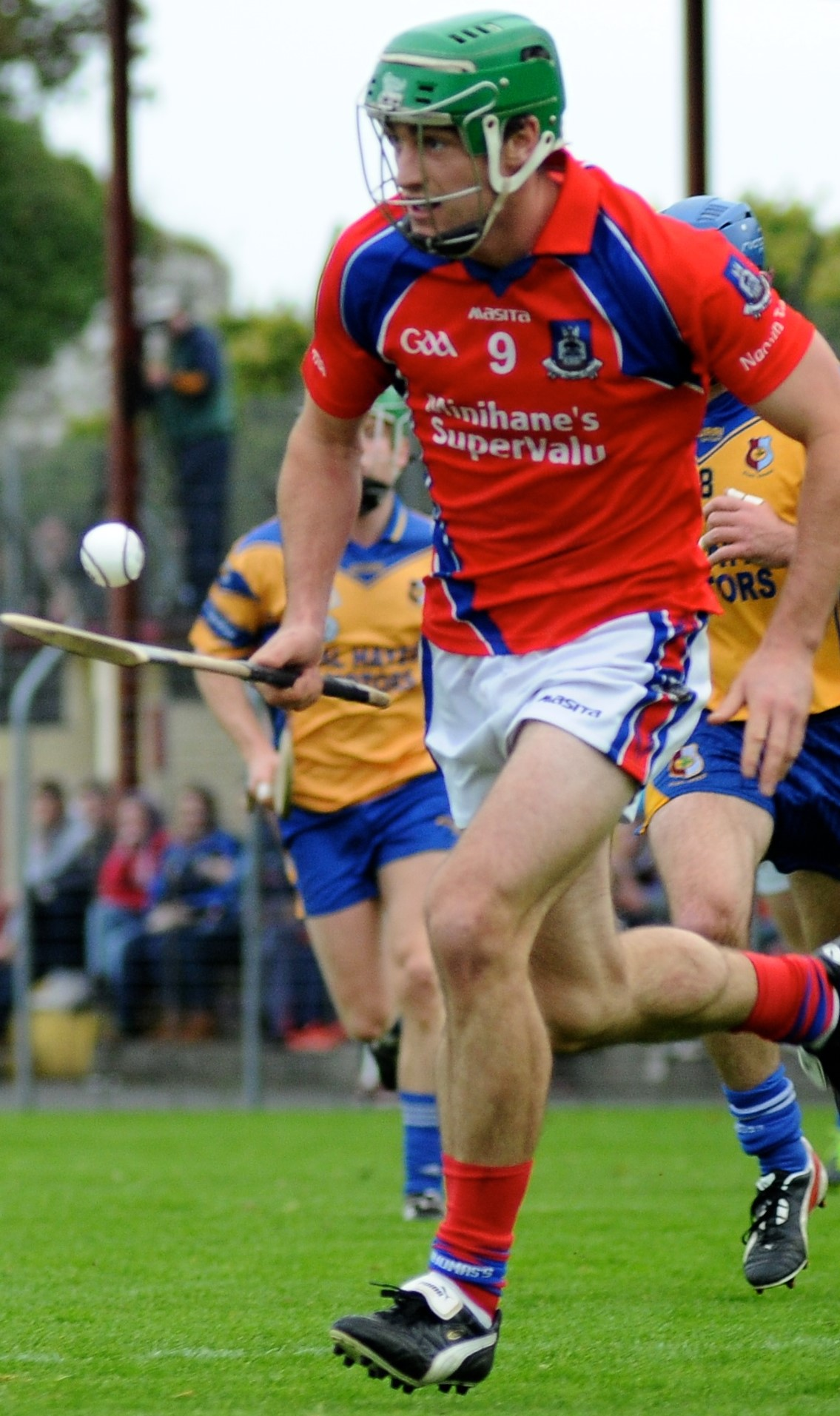
David Burke scored two goals in the 2012 final replay.

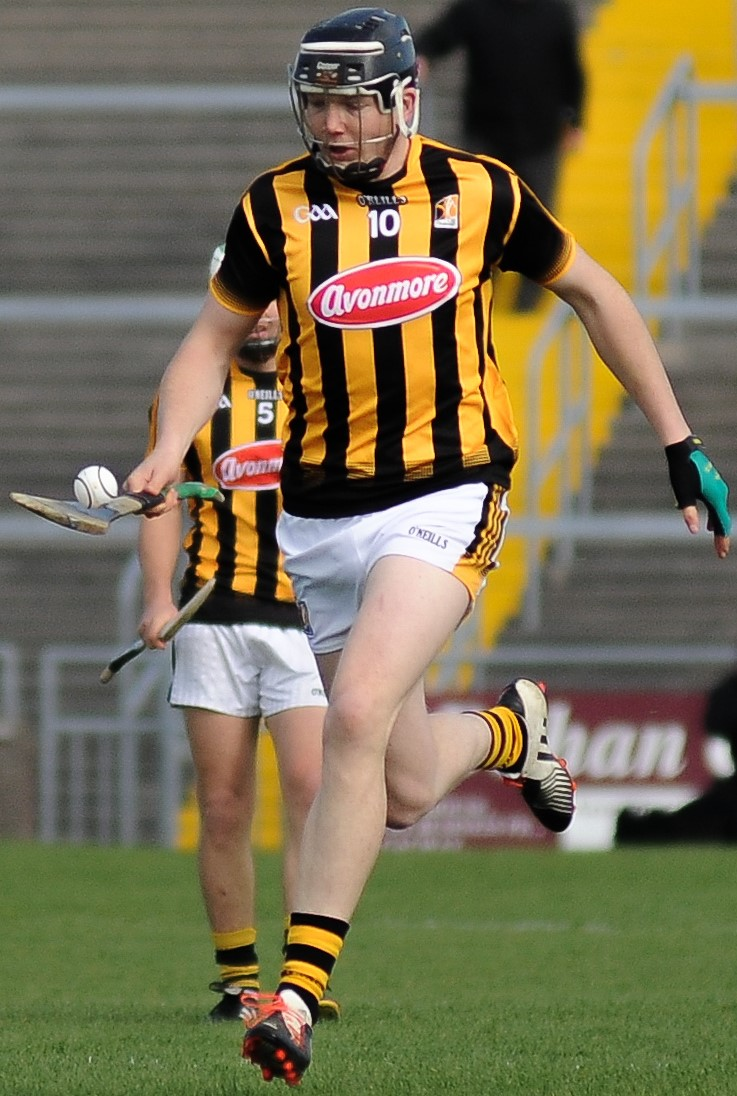
Walter Walsh scored a goal in the 2012 final replay.

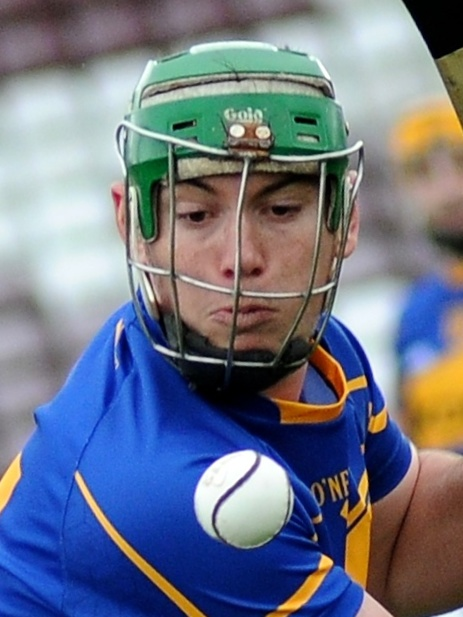
John O'Dwyer scored a goal in the 2016 final.

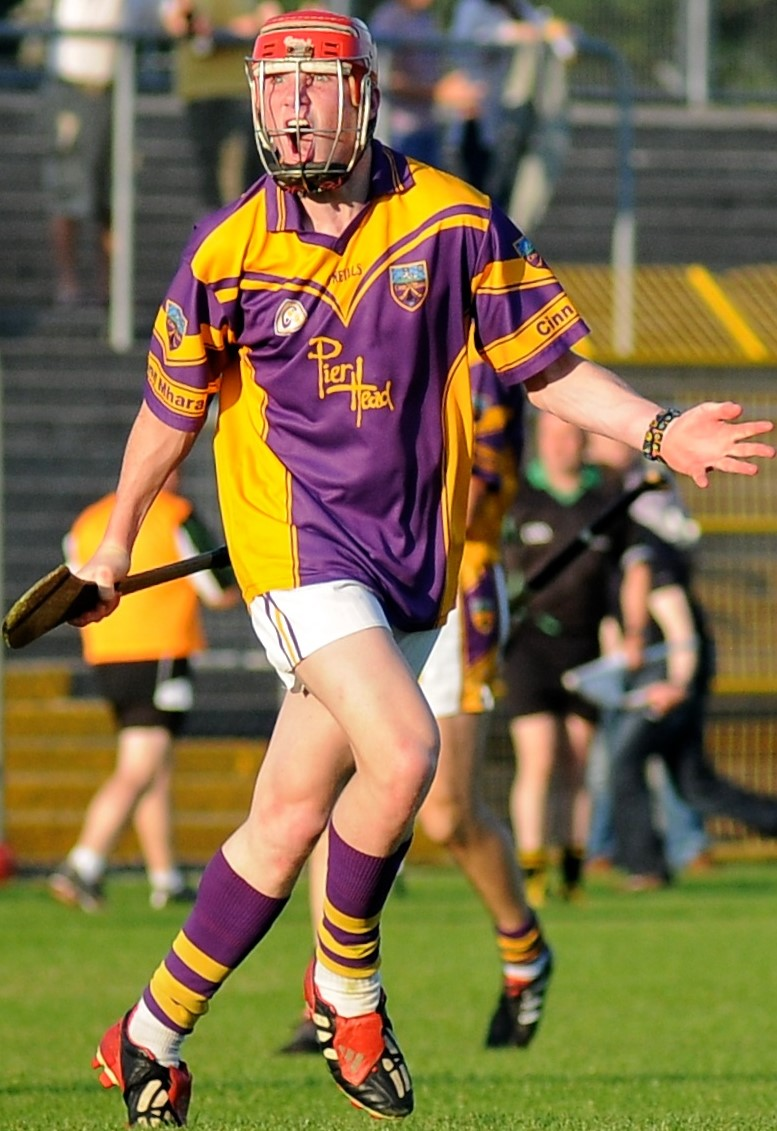
Conor Whelan scored a goal in the 2018 final.

=== Pre-1921 ===
Year	Detail
1887	Tom Healy for Tipp
1891	2 goals for Kerry; 1 goal for Wexford
1901	1 goal for London
1915	4 goals for Cork, including 3 in first half by "Major" Kennedy, Paddy O'Halloran and Larry Flaherty; 6 goals for Laois, including 4 in the second half, 3 by Jim Hiney

=== 1921 to 1996: Introduction of the Liam MacCarthy Cup ===
Year	Detail
1959 (1)	1 goal for Waterford; 5 goals for Kilkenny
1959 (2)	3 goals for Waterford; 1 goal for Kilkenny
1960	2 goals for Wexford
1961	1 goal for Dublin
1962	3 goals for Tipp; 2 for Wexford
1963	4 goals for Kilkenny; 6 for Waterford
1964	5 goals for Tipp; 2 for Kilkenny
1965	2 goals for Tipp
1966	3 goals for Cork; 1 goal for Kilkenny
1967	3 goals for Kilkenny; 2 goals for Tipp
1968	5 goals for Wexford; 3 goals for Tipp
1969	2 goals for Kilkenny; 2 goals for Cork
1970	Tony Doran X2 (first goal of the game after 4 minutes and his team's last goal, in the second half), Dan Quigley (first half, third goal of the game) Pat Quigley X2 (with two minutes left of the first half; then in the second half) for Wexford; Eddie O'Brien X3 (after 11 minutes; later in the first half; after an hour), Charlie Cullinane (first half, fourth goal of the game), Willie Walsh (90 seconds into the second half), Charlie McCarthy (second half) for Cork
1971	Noel O'Dwyer (after 19 minutes, first goal of the game), John Flanagan (first half, two minutes after Keher's first goal), Roger Ryan X2 (both second half, sixth goal of the game, less than two minutes after Byrne's goal, followed by eighth goal of the game), and Dinny Ryan (second half, second last goal of the game before Keher completed the goals) for Tipp; Eddie Keher X2 (first half, a minute after O'Dwyer's opening goal of the game and at the end, last goal of the game), Mossy Murphy (fourth goal of the game, a minute before half-time), Ned Byrne (fifth goal of the game, in the 45th minute) and Kieran Purcell (second half, seventh goal of the game) for Kilkenny
1972	Ray Cummins X2 (4 minutes and second half, 30 seconds after Keher's first goal), Mick Malone X2 (32? minutes and second half, third goal of the game), S. O'Leary for Cork; Eddie Keher X2 (both second half, fourth goal of the game and "with thirteen minutes left") and Frank Cummins (last goal of the game) for Kilkenny
1973	Pat Delaney for Kilkenny (first half); Mossie Dowling (later than six minutes into the second half) for Limerick
1974	3 goals for Kilkenny; 1 goal for Limerick
1975	Frank Burke (18th minute) and P. J. Qualter (second half, between Keher's two goals) for Galway; Eddie Keher X2 (three minutes into the second half and a p 20 minutes from the end) for Kilkenny;
1976	2 goals for Cork; 4 goals for Wexford
1977	1 goal for Cork; 3 goals for Wexford
1978	Kevin Fennelly (first half) and Billy Fitzpatrick (second half, immediately after Barry-Murphy's goal) for Kilkenny; Jimmy Barry-Murphy (about 13 minutes from the end) for Cork
1979	L. O'Brien and M. Brennan for Kilkenny; Noel Lane for Galway
1980	Bernie Forde (after two and half minutes) and P. J. Molloy (second goal of the game) for Galway; Éamonn Cregan X2 (first half, second half) and J. McKenna (second half) for Limerick
1981	2 goals for Offaly, incl. a Johnny Flaherty handpassed goal
1982	C. Heffernan X2 and G. Fennelly for Kilkenny; E. O'Donoghue for Cork
1983	R. Power and L. Fennelly for Kilkenny; Seánie O'Leary and Tomás Mulcahy for Cork
1984	Seánie O'Leary X2 (game's first goal in first half, game's third goal in second half) and Kevin Hennessy (second half, second goal of the game) for Cork; Mark Corrigan (end of second half) for Offaly
1985	2 goals for Offaly; 1 goal for Galway
1986	John Fenton (after eight minutes), Kevin Hennessy X2 (the first shortly after Fenton's, the second after Commins's and before Molloy's in the second half), Tomás Mulcahy (second half) for Cork; John Commins (goalkeeper, eight minutes from the end) and P. J. Molloy (a minute from the end) for Galway
1987	Noel Lane for Galway (63rd minute to make it 1.11 to 0.9)
1988	Noel Lane for Galway
1989	Declan Ryan (after 18 minutes), Nicky English X2, Pat Fox for Tipp; Brian Donnelly, Aidan McCarry, Donal Armstrong for Antrim
1990	Kevin Hennessy (after 48 seconds), Tomás Mulcahy (nine minutes into the second half), Mark Foley (second half), John Fitzgibbon X2 (less than 90 seconds apart, in the second half) for Cork; Joe Cooney (first half) and Brendan Lynskey (second half) for Galway
1991	1 goal for Tipp (Michael Cleary?)
1992	D. J. Carey, L. McCarthy and J. Power for Kilkenny; G. Manley for Cork
1993	P. J. Delaney and A. Ronan for Kilkenny; L. Burke for Galway
1994	D. Quigley X2 for Limerick; Johnny Dooley, Joe Dooley, Pat O'Connor for Offaly
1995	Johnny Pilkington (in the second half) and Michael Duignan for Offaly; Éamonn Taaffe for Clare, in the second half
1996	T. Dempsey for Wexford

=== 1997 to present ===
Year	Detail
1997	E. O'Neill and L. Cahill for Tipperary
1998	Brian Whelahan and J. Errity for Offaly; C. Carter for Kilkenny
2000	D. J. Carey (6'), Henry Shefflin (9') and Charlie Carter (before half-time), Henry Shefflin (after half-time, before 59'), Eddie Brennan (second half injury-time) for Kilkenny; Johnny Pilkington for Offaly (59')
2001	Mark O'Leary (X2) for Tipp; Eugene Cloonan and Fergal Healy for Galway
2002	Henry Shefflin and D. J. Carey for Kilkenny
2003	Martin Comerford for Kilkenny; S. Ó hAilpín for Cork
2005	Ben O'Connor for Cork; Damien Hayes for Galway
2006	Aidan Fogarty for Kilkenny; Ben O'Connor for Cork
2007	Eddie Brennan and Henry Shefflin for Kilkenny; Ollie Moran for Limerick
2008	Eddie Brennan (X2) and Eoin Larkin for Kilkenny; Eoin Kelly for Waterford
2009	Henry Shefflin and Martin Comerford for Kilkenny
2010	Lar Corbett (X3) and Noel McGrath for Tipperary; Richie Power for Kilkenny
2011	Richie Hogan and Michael Fennelly for Kilkenny; P. Bourke for Tipp
2012 (1)	Joe Canning and N. Burke for Galway
2012 (2)	David Burke (X2) 16', 17' and J. Glynn for Galway; Walter Walsh, Richie Power and Colin Fennelly for Kilkenny
2013 (1)	Anthony Nash, Patrick Cronin and Conor Lehane for Cork
2013 (2)	Shane O'Donnell (X3), D. Honan and Conor McGrath for Clare; Anthony Nash, Séamus Harnedy and Stephen Moylan for Cork
2014 (1)	T. J. Reid, Richie Power for Kilkenny; Patrick Maher for Tipp
2014 (2)	Richie Power and John Power for Kilkenny; Séamus Callanan (X2) for Tipp
2015	T. J. Reid for Kilkenny 14'; Joe Canning for Galway, last score of the game
2016	Kevin Kelly and Richie Hogan for Kilkenny; John O'Dwyer and John McGrath for Tipp
2017	K. Moran and K. Bennett for Waterford

Year	Player	Team	Score	Minute	Result	Report	Ref
2018	Graeme Mulcahy	Limerick		16'	3–16 (25) - 2-18 (24)	Report	
2018	Tom Morrissey	Limerick		54'	3–16 (25) - 2-18 (24)	Report	
2018	Shane Dowling	Limerick		68'	3–16 (25) - 2-18 (24)	Report	
2018	Conor Whelan	Galway		70+1'	3–16 (25) - 2-18 (24)	Report	
2018	Joe Canning	Galway		70+5'	3–16 (25) - 2-18 (24)	Report	
2019	Niall O'Meara	Tipp	1–05 (8) - 0-08 (8)	25'	3–25 (31) - 0-20 (20)	[ Report]	
2019	Séamus Callanan	Tipp		38'	3–25 (31) - 0-20 (20)	[ Report]	
2019	John O'Dwyer	Tipp		43'	3–25 (31) - 0-20 (20)	[ Report]	
2021	Gearóid Hegarty	Limerick	1–01 (4) - 0-01 (1)	2'	3–32 (41) - 1-22 (25)	Report	
2021	Shane Kingston	Cork		4'	3–32 (41) - 1-22 (25)	Report	
2021	Aaron Gillane	Limerick	2–05 (11) - 1-05 (8)	15'	3–32 (41) - 1-22 (25)	Report	
2021	Gearóid Hegarty	Limerick		1st half	3–32 (41) - 1-22 (25)	Report	
2022	Gearóid Hegarty	Limerick	1–01 (4) - 0-00 (0)	4'	1–31 (34) - 2-26 (32)	Report	
2022	Billy Ryan	Kilkenny	1–19 (23) - 1-16 (19)	38'	1–31 (34) - 2-26 (32)	Report	
2022	Martin Keoghan	Kilkenny	1–22 (25) - 2-18 (24)	47'	1–31 (34) - 2-26 (32)	Report	
2023	Eoin Cody	Kilkenny		10'	0–30 (30) - 2-15 (21)	[ Report]	
2023	Paddy Deegan	Kilkenny		Second half	0–30 (30) - 2-15 (21)	[ Report]	
2024	Rob Downey	Cork		12'	3–29 (38) - 1-34 (37)	[ Report]	
2024	Aidan MacCarthy	Clare		18'	3–29 (38) - 1-34 (37)	[ Report]	
2024	Mark Rodgers	Clare		40'	3–29 (38) - 1-34 (37)	[ Report]	
2024	Tony Kelly	Clare	3–15 (24) – 1–18 (21)	52'	3–29 (38) - 1-34 (37)	[ Report]	

== Goalless finals ==
1999

2004

2020

== Goalscoring goalkeepers ==
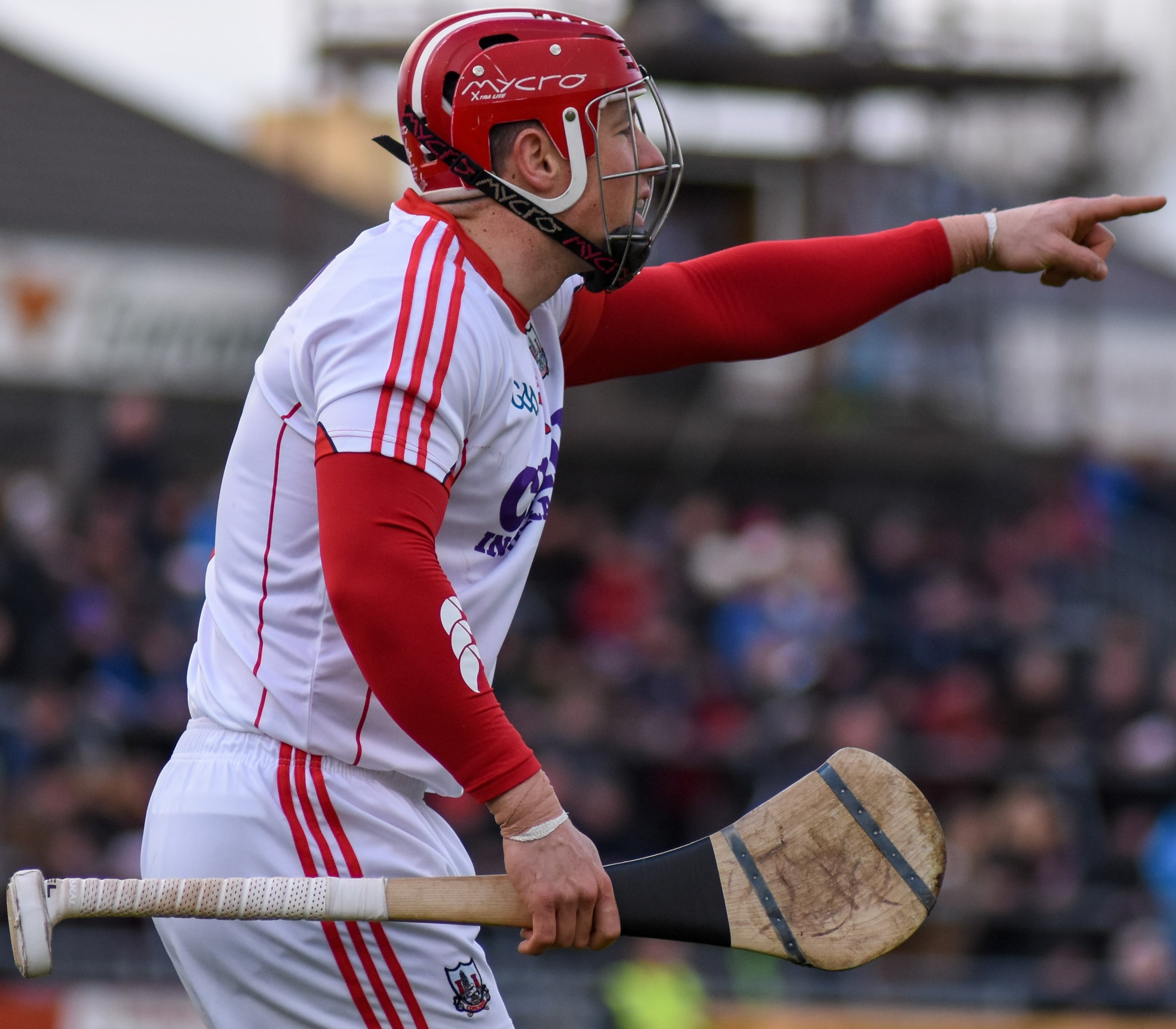
Anthony Nash scored two goals in 2013, one in the drawn game and one in the replay.

John Commins (1) 1986

Anthony Nash (2) 2013 (draw), 2013 (replay)

== Men with multiple goals ==
Shane O'Donnell scored three goals in the 2013 final replay.

They include:

Player	Number of goals	Team	Year(s)
Eddie Keher	6	Kilkenny	1971 (X2), 1972 (X2), 1975 (X2)
Seánie O'Leary	5	Cork	1972, 1977, 1983, 1984 (X2)
Henry Shefflin	5	Kilkenny	2000 (X2), 2002, 2007, 2009
Richie Power	5	Kilkenny	2010, 2012 replay, 2014 drawn game (X2), 2014 replay
Kevin Hennessy	4	Cork	1984, 1986 (X2), 1990
Eddie Brennan	4	Kilkenny	2000, 2007, 2008 (X2)
Eddie O'Brien	3	Cork	1970 (X3)
Noel Lane	3	Galway	1979, 1987, 1988
Tomás Mulcahy	3	Cork	1983, 1986, 1990
D. J. Carey	3	Kilkenny	1992, 2000, 2002
Lar Corbett	3	Tipperary	2010 (X3)
Shane O'Donnell	3	Clare	2013 replay (X3)
Joe Canning	3	Galway	2012 drawn game, 2015, 2018
Séamus Callanan	3	Tipp	2014 replay (X2), 2019
Gearóid Hegarty	3	Limerick	2021 (X2), 2022
Pat Quigley	2	Wexford	1970 (X2)
Tony Doran	2	Wexford	1970 (X2)
Roger Ryan	2	Tipp	1971 (X2)
Mick Malone	2	Cork	1972 (X2)
Ray Cummins	2	Cork	1972 (X2)
Éamonn Cregan	2	Limerick	1980 (X2)
C. Heffernan	2	Kilkenny	1982 (X2)
P. J. Molloy	2	Galway	1980, 1986
Nicky English	2	Tipp	1989 (X2)
John Fitzgibbon	2	Cork	1990 (X2)
D. Quigley	2	Limerick	1994 (X2)
Charlie Carter	2	Kilkenny	1999, 2000
Johnny Pilkington	2	Offaly	1995, 2000
Mark O'Leary	2	Tipp	2001
Ben O'Connor	2	Cork	2005, 2006
Martin Comerford	2	Kilkenny	2003, 2009
David Burke	2	Galway	2012 replay (X2)
Anthony Nash	2	Cork	2013 drawn game, 2013 replay
T. J. Reid	2	Kilkenny	2014 drawn game, 2015
Richie Hogan	2	Kilkenny	2011, 2015
John O'Dwyer	2	Tipp	2016, 2019

== Men who scored from placed balls ==
In 2022, Martin Breheny gave a list of All-Ireland final goals scored from placed balls, published in the Irish Independent.
