= Joachim Kelly =

Offaly hurler and manager

Personal information
- Native name: Joachim Ó Ceallaigh (Irish)
- Born: 2 December 1955 (age 70) Lusmagh, County Offaly, Ireland
- Occupation: Garda Síochána
- Height: 6 ft 0 in (183 cm)

Sport
- Sport: Hurling
- Position: Midfield
Club
- Years: Club
- 1971–2003: Lusmagh
Club titles
- Offaly titles: 1
Inter-county*
Years	County	Apps (scores)
1974–1993	Offaly	46 (2–31)
Inter-county titles
- Leinster titles: 7
- All-Irelands: 2
- NHL: 1
- All Stars: 2
- *Inter County team apps and scores correct as of 21:52, 21 May 2019.

Joachim Kelly (born 2 December 1955) is an Irish hurling manager, former hurling player and a former manager of the Offaly senior hurling team. Kelly played for club side Lusmagh and was a member of the Offaly senior hurling team for 19 seasons, during which time he usually lined out at midfield.

Kelly began his hurling career at club level with Lusmagh. He broke onto the club's top adult team as a 15-year-old in 1971 and enjoyed his first success in 1973 when his club won the Offaly Junior Championship. Kelly later won an Offaly Senior Championship medal in 1989 when Lusmagh won their title. He ended his club career with the Lusmagh junior B in 2003.

At inter-county level, Kelly began his career at minor level in 1973 before progressing onto the Offaly under-21 team. He joined the Offaly senior team in 1974. From his debut, Kelly lined out in a variety of positions, including midfield, half-forward, corner-forward and centre-back, and made a record 171 National League and Championship appearances in a career that ended with his last game in 1993. During that time he was part of two All-Ireland Championship-winning teams – in 1981, 1985. Kelly also secured seven Leinster Championship medals and a National Hurling League medal. He announced his retirement from inter-county hurling on 15 September 1993.

Kelly won his first All-Star in 1980, before claiming a further All-Star in 1984. At inter-provincial level, Kelly was selected to play in several championship campaigns with Leinster, with his sole Railway Cup medal being won in 1979.

As a manager, selector, coach and trainer, Kelly has previously worked with club sides: Lusmagh, Loughmore–Castleiney, Kilcormac–Killoughey, Portumna, Shinrone and Coolderry, and inter-county teams Westmeath, Wexford and Roscommon.

== Playing career ==
=== Lusmagh ===
Kelly joined the Lusmagh club at a young age and played in all grades at juvenile and underage levels. He was still eligible for the minor grade when he joined the club's top adult team during the 1971 Offaly Junior Championship.

On 26 November 1973, Kelly was at wing-forward when Lusmagh faced Ballinamere in the final of the Offaly Junior Championship. He top-scored with 3–01 in the 6–03 to 3–05 victory.

On 10 October 1982, lined out at centre-forward when Lusmagh faced St. Rynagh's in their very first Offaly Senior Championship final. He scored a point from play but ended on the losing side following a 2–09 to 0–11 defeat.

When Lusmagh qualified for their next final on 22 October 1989, Kelly was switched from the forwards to midfield as well as being player-manager. He remained scoreless throughout the game but collected a winners' medal following a 1–11 to 1–10 defeat of Seir Kieran.

On 1 November 1992, Kelly lined out in a third and final Offaly Senior Championship final. He scored 0-02 but ended on the losing side following a 0–10 to 0–09 defeat by St. Rynagh's.

=== Offaly ===
==== Senior ====
Kelly joined the Offaly senior team prior to the start of the 1974-75 National League. He made his first appearance for the team when he lined out at left wing-forward in a 5–03 to 3–08 defeat of Antrim on 13 October 1974. Kelly made his first appearance in the Leinster Championship on 22 June when he was selected at right corner-forward for the 6–06 to 4–12 draw with Kildare.

On 13 July 1980, Kelly lined out at midfield when Offaly faced Kilkenny in what was only their second Leinster final appearance in 50 years. He scored a point from play in the 3–17 to 5–10 victory in what was Offaly's first ever provincial title. Kelly ended the season by claiming a first All-Star award.

On 12 July 1981, Kelly won a second successive Leinster Championship following Offaly's 3–12 to 2–13 defeat of Wexford in the final. This victory gave Offaly a straight passage to the All-Ireland final against reigning champions Galway on 6 September. Kelly lined out at midfield and collected an All-Ireland winners' medal following the 2–12 to 0–15 victory.

Kelly lined out in his by now customary position of midfield when Offaly qualified for a third successive Leinster final on 25 July 1982. Offaly suffered their first provincial defeat in three seasons following a 1–11 to 0–12 defeat by Kilkenny.

On 10 July 1983, Kelly lined out at midfield in a fourth successive Leinster final. He scored a point from play in the 1–17 to 0–13 defeat by reigning champions Kilkenny.

Offaly reached a sixth successive Leinster final on 8 July 1984, with Kelly once again lining out at midfield. He collected a third winners' medal following the 1–15 to 2–11 defeat of Wexford. Offaly subsequently qualified for an All-Ireland final-meeting with Cork at Semple Stadium on 2 September. Kelly was held scoreless from midfield in the 3–16 to 1–12 defeat. He ended the season with a second All-Star award.

On 21 July 1985, Kelly lined out at midfield in his sixth successive Leinster final. He claimed a fourth winners' medal following the 5–15 to 0–17 defeat of Laois. Kelly retained his position at midfield for the All-Ireland final against Galway on 1 September 1985. He remained scoreless throughout the game but collected a second All-Ireland medal following a 2–11 to 1–12 victory.

Offaly qualified for an eighth successive Leinster final on 13 July 1986. Kelly was again at midfield, however, he ended up on the losing side following a 4–10 to 1–11 defeat by Kilkenny.

For the ninth successive season, Offaly qualified for the Leinster final on 2 August 1987 with Kelly lining out at midfield. Kilkenny ended that game as champions following a 2–14 to 0–17 victory.

Offaly continued their dominance of the Leinster Championship by qualifying for a tenth successive final on 10 July 1988. Kelly claimed a fifth winners' medal overall - his first in three seasons - following a 3–12 to 1–14 defeat of Wexford.

On 9 July 1989, Kelly lined out in his 11th Leinster final. He scored a point from midfield and collected a sixth winners' medal following the 3–15 to 4–09 defeat of Kilkenny.

For the 12th successive season, Offaly qualified for the Leinster final on 1 July 1990 with Kelly lining out at midfield. He scored a point from play and collected a seventh winners' medal following the 1–19 to 2–11 defeat of Dublin.

1991 began well as Offaly captured their first National League title, however, Offaly surrendered their provincial crown to Kilkenny. Kelly played his final championship game for Offaly against Kilkenny in the Leinster semi-final of 1993.

=== Leinster ===
Kelly also lined out with Leinster in the inter-provincial hurling competition. He won one Railway Cup title following a victory over Connacht in 1979.

== Managerial career ==
=== Early career ===
Four years before his retirement from inter-county hurling Kelly had already ventured into hurling management. He broke his leg in 1990 which ruled him out of playing for some time. To stay involved in the game he took charge of the Westmeath senior hurling team. In his first year in charge Westmeath won promotion to Division 2 of the National League. In Kelly's second year in charge his team won the All-Ireland 'B' title in Croke Park.

After his two-year stint with the Westmeath, Kelly joined Éamonn Cregan's Offaly backroom team in 1995. He remained a selector for just over a year, having tendered his resignation after the Leinster final defeat to Wexford in July 1996.

At club level Kelly had a two-year spell as manager of Loughmore–Castleiney in Tipperary. In 1997 he devoted his time to the management of Kilcormac–Killoughey. In 1999, he managed the Wexford senior hurling team for one season, ending in a heavy championship defeat to Offaly.

In 2008, Joachim was announced as manager of the Offaly Junior Camogie Team which is their main team. In his first year they reached the All-Ireland Junior Camogie Final. They lost to Clare after a late late goal by Shonagh Enright. However, just one year later, in 2009, they did in fact capture the All-Ireland Camogie title.

In December 2013, he was announced as trainer of the Roscommon senior county team for 2014, working with manager Justin Campbell, a former Galway hurler.

=== Coolderry ===
Kelly took over as manager of the Coolderry senior hurling team prior to the start of the 2018 Offaly Senior Championship. On 7 October, he guided the club to their 31st Offaly Senior Championship following a 2–17 to 0–17 defeat of Kilcormac/Killoughey in the final.

=== Offaly ===
Kelly was appointed interim manager of the Offaly senior hurling team on 20 May 2019, following Kevin Martin's removal from the position. Michael Fennelly succeeded him as manager.

Sporting positions
Preceded by Pat Delaney	Offaly Senior Hurling Captain; 1987	Succeeded by
Preceded by Kevin Lynch	Westmeath Senior Hurling Manager; 1990–1991	Succeeded by Georgie Leahy
Preceded by Rory Kinsella	Wexford Senior Hurling Manager; 1999–2000	Succeeded by Tony Dempsey
Preceded by Kevin Martin	Offaly Senior Hurling Manager; 2019	Succeeded by Michael Fennelly
