= John Moore (referee) =

Irish hurling referee

- Full name: John Moore
- Born: 1949 (age 76–77); Waterford, Ireland
- Other occupation: Post Office official

John Moore (born 1949) is an Irish retired hurling referee. Born in Waterford, he became one of the top referees throughout the 1980s and 1990s and officiated at several All-Ireland finals in minor, under-21 and senior levels.

Achievements
Preceded by Pat Delaney (Laois)	All-Ireland SHC Final referee 1990	Succeeded by Willie Horgan (Cork)
