= 1898 All-Ireland Senior Hurling Championship final =

1898 All-Ireland Senior Hurling Final
- Event: 1898 All-Ireland Senior Hurling Championship
Tipperary	Kilkenny
7-13	3-10
- Date: 25 March 1900
- Venue: Jones' Road, Dublin
- Referee: J. J. McCabe (Dublin)
- Attendance: 2,500

The 1898 All-Ireland Senior Hurling Championship Final was the 11th All-Ireland Final and the culmination of the 1898 All-Ireland Senior Hurling Championship, an inter-county hurling tournament for the top teams in Ireland. The match was held at Jones' Road, Dublin, on 25 March 1900 between Kilkenny, represented by club side Three Castles, and Tipperary, represented by club side Tubberadora. The Leinster champions lost to their Munster opponents on a score line of 7–13 to 3–10.

== Match details ==
1900-03-25

Tipperary	7-13 – 3-10	Kilkenny

Jones' Road, Dublin
Attendance: 2,500
Referee: J. J. McCabe (Dublin)
