= 1986 All-Ireland Senior Hurling Championship final =

1986 All-Ireland Senior Hurling Final
- Event: 1986 All-Ireland Senior Hurling Championship
Cork	Galway
4-13	2-15
- Date: 7 September 1986
- Venue: Croke Park, Dublin
- Man of the Match: Johnny Crowley
- Referee: J. F. Bailey (Dublin)
- Attendance: 63,451

The 1986 All-Ireland Senior Hurling Championship Final was a hurling match played at Croke Park on 7 September 1986 to determine the winners of the 1986 All-Ireland Senior Hurling Championship, the 100th season of the All-Ireland Senior Hurling Championship, a tournament organised by the Gaelic Athletic Association for the champions of the four provinces of Ireland. The final was contested by Cork of Munster and Galway of Connacht, with Cork winning by 4-13 to 2-15.

Cork were rank outsiders coming into the game as Galway had used the imaginative tactic of a two-man full-forward line to dispose of Kilkenny in the All-Ireland semi-final. Galway deployed this tactic once again in the final, however, the Cork team retained the positions leaving Johnny Crowley free at the Hill 16 end. When Galway realised that this move failed to pay any dividends they resorted back to the orthodox formation. Cork, in spite of playing against he wind, had a blistering first quarter. A goal from a twenty-yard John Fenton free after just eight minutes was quickly followed by a second from Kevin Hennessy. Galway rallied strongly in the second quarter, leaving Cork just 2-5 to 0-10 ahead at the interval.

Galway introduced P. J. Molloy and Michael Connolly to their attack for the second half as Cork lost John Fenton to an ankle injury. Of all the goals it was Tomás Mulcahy who scored the most spectacular of the day. After collecting a puck-out from Ger Cunningham he ran fifty metres before rifling the sliotar to the back of the Galway net. Galway's first goal didn't come until eight minutes from the end as goalkeeper John Commins sent a twenty-metre free to the net. That goal came too late as Kevin Hennessy had bagged his second just before that. P. J. Molloy got Galway's second goal a minute from time, however, it was too little too late. Fittingly, it was Jimmy Barry-Murphy, playing in his last game, who scored Cork's last point.

Cork's All-Ireland victory was their first since 1984. The win gave them their 26th All-Ireland title over all and bolstered their position as outright leaders on the all-time roll of honour. Similarly, Cork preserved their record of having never been beaten by Galway in an All-Ireland final.

Galway's All-Ireland defeat was their 13th over all. It was their second in succession and their third since their last All-Ireland final victory in 1980. It was Galway's fourth All-Ireland final defeat by Cork in an All-Ireland final.

== Match ==
=== Details ===
7 September 1986

Cork	4-13 – 2-15	Galway
K. Hennessy (2–1), J. Fenton (1–4), T. Mulcahy (1–1), K. Kingston (0–2), J. Barry-Murphy (0–2), T. O'Sullivan (0–1), G. FitzGerald (0–1), T. Cashman (0–1).		T. Keady (0–5), J. Cooney (0–4), P. J. Molloy (1–1), J. Commins (1–0), M. Naughton (0–2), S. Mahon (0–1), P. Finnerty (0–1), P. Murphy (0–1).

Croke Park, Dublin
Attendance: 63,451
Referee: J. F. Bailey (Dublin)

Cork	Galway
