= 1893 All-Ireland Senior Hurling Championship final =

1893 All-Ireland Senior Hurling Final
- Event: 1893 All-Ireland Senior Hurling Championship
Cork	Kilkenny
6-8	0-2
- Date: 24 June 1894
- Venue: Phoenix Park, Dublin
- Referee: J. J. Kenny (Dublin)
- Attendance: 1,000

The 1893 All-Ireland Senior Hurling Championship Final was the 6th All-Ireland Final and the culmination of the 1893 All-Ireland Senior Hurling Championship, an inter-county hurling tournament for the top teams in Ireland. The match was held at the Phoenix Park, Dublin, on 24 June 1894 between Cork, represented by club side Blackrock, and Kilkenny, represented by club side Confederation. The Leinster champions lost to their Munster opponents on a score line of 6–8 to 0–2.

== Match details ==
1894-06-24

Cork	6-8 – 0-2	Kilkenny

Phoenix Park, Dublin
Attendance: 1,000
Referee: J. J. Kenny (Dublin)

Cork Team, Miah Norberg, David Hayes, Michael Murphy, Pat Coughlan, Jim Young, S Hegarty, John O'leary, Paddy O'Keefe, Michael Cronin, Jack Cullinane, John Curtis Murphy, James Delea, Denis Scannell, John Cashman, John O'Connor, Pat Flaherty, Willie John O'Connell
