= 1928 All-Ireland Senior Hurling Championship final =

1928 All-Ireland Senior Hurling Final
- Event: 1928 All-Ireland Senior Hurling Championship
Cork	Galway
6-12	1-0
- Date: 9 September 1928
- Venue: Croke Park, Dublin
- Referee: John Roberts (Kilkenny)
- Attendance: 15,259

The 1928 All-Ireland Senior Hurling Championship Final was the 41st All-Ireland Final and the culmination of the 1928 All-Ireland Senior Hurling Championship, an inter-county hurling tournament for the top teams in Ireland. The match was held at Croke Park, Dublin, on 9 September 1928, between Cork and Galway. The Connacht men lost to their Munster opponents on a score line of 6–12 to 1–0.

== Match details ==
1928-09-09

Cork	6-12 – 1-0	Galway

Croke Park, Dublin
Attendance: 15,259
Referee: J. Roberts (Kilkenny)

Cork	Galway

Cork Team 1 Jeremiah Miah Burke 2 Sean Og Murphy 3 Edward Marie O'Connell 4 Morgan Madden 5 Jim O'Regan 6 Dinny Barry Murphy 7 Peter Hawker O'Grady 8 Jim Hurley 9 Mick O'Connell 10 Tom Barry 11 Paddy Balty Ahern 12 Paddy Delea 13 Eugene Eudie Coughlan 14 Mick Leahy 15 Michael Gah Ahern Trainers Patrick Pakey O'Mahony and Jim Tough Barry
