= 1926 All-Ireland Senior Hurling Championship final =

1926 All-Ireland Senior Hurling Final
- Event: 1926 All-Ireland Senior Hurling Championship
Cork	Kilkenny
4-6	2-0
- Date: 24 October 1926
- Venue: Croke Park, Dublin
- Referee: P. McCullagh (Wexford)
- Attendance: 26,829

The 1926 All-Ireland Senior Hurling Championship Final was the 39th All-Ireland Final and the culmination of the 1926 All-Ireland Senior Hurling Championship, an inter-county hurling tournament for the top teams in Ireland. The match was held at Croke Park, Dublin, on 24 October 1926 between Cork and Kilkenny. The Leinster champions lost to their Munster opponents on a score line of 4–6 to 2–0.

== Match details ==
1926-10-24

Cork	4-6 – 2-0	Kilkenny

Croke Park, Dublin
Attendance: 26,829
Referee: P. McCullagh (Wexford)

Cork	Kilkenny

Cork Team 1 John Ballyhea Coughlan 2 Maurice Murphy 3 Sean Og Murphy 4 Mick Murphy 5 Dinny Barry Murphy 6 Jim O'Regan 7 Edward Marie O'Connell 8 Jim Hurley 9 Bill Higgins 10 Paddy Delea 11 Mattie Murphy 12 Eugene Eudie Coughlan 13 Paddy Balty Ahern 14 Michael Gah Ahern 15 Joe Kearney Trainers Patrick Pakey O'Mahony and Jim Tough Barry
