= 1911 All-Ireland Senior Hurling Championship final =

1911 All-Ireland Senior Hurling Final
- Event: 1911 All-Ireland Senior Hurling Championship
Kilkenny	Tipperary
3-3	1-1
- Date: 28 July 1912
- Venue: Fraher Field, Dungarvan

The 1911 All-Ireland Senior Hurling Championship Final was the twenty-fourth All-Ireland Final and the culmination of the 1911 All-Ireland Senior Hurling Championship, an inter-county hurling tournament for the top teams in Ireland.

The game was supposed to be between Limerick and Kilkenny, but Limerick refused to play in Thurles after the original fixture on 18 February 1911 in Cork was postponed owing to the state of the pitch. Tipperary were nominated to play in the All-Ireland final in their absence. Kilkenny were the winners.
