= 1896 All-Ireland Senior Hurling Championship final =

1896 All-Ireland Senior Hurling Final
- Event: 1896 All-Ireland Senior Hurling Championship
Tipperary	Dublin
8-14	0-4
- Date: 27 March 1898
- Venue: Jones' Road, Dublin
- Referee: D. Wood (Dublin)
- Attendance: 3,500

The 1896 All-Ireland Senior Hurling Championship Final was the 9th All-Ireland Final and the culmination of the 1896 All-Ireland Senior Hurling Championship, an inter-county hurling tournament for the top teams in Ireland. The match was held at Jones' Road, Dublin, on 27 March 1898 between Dublin, represented by club side Commercials, and Tipperary, represented by club side Tubberadora. The Leinster champions lost to their Munster opponents on a score line of 8–14 to 0–4.

== Match details ==
1898-03-27

Tipperary	8-14 – 0-4	Dublin

Jones' Road, Dublin
Attendance: 3,500
Referee: D. Wood (Dublin)
