= 1904 All-Ireland Senior Hurling Championship final =

1904 All-Ireland Senior Hurling Final
- Event: 1904 All-Ireland Senior Hurling Championship
Kilkenny	Cork
1-9	1-8
- Date: 24 June 1906
- City: Carrick-on-Suir

The 1904 All-Ireland Senior Hurling Championship Final was the 17th All-Ireland Final and the culmination of the 1904 All-Ireland Senior Hurling Championship, an inter-county hurling tournament for the top teams in Ireland. The match was held on Maurice Davin's land in Carrick-on-Suir on 24 June 1906 between Cork and Kilkenny. Kilkenny won by a single point.

Kilkenny led by 1–5 to 0–5 at half time.

== Match details ==
24 June 1906

Kilkenny	1-9 – 1-8	Cork

Carrick-on-Suir
