= 1900 All-Ireland Senior Hurling Championship final =

1900 All-Ireland Senior Hurling Final
- Event: 1900 All-Ireland Senior Hurling Championship
Tipperary	London
2-5	0-6
- Date: 26 October 1902
- Venue: Jones' Road, Dublin
- Referee: John McCarthy (Kilkenny)
- Attendance: 8,000

The 1900 All-Ireland Senior Hurling Championship Final was the 13th All-Ireland Final and the culmination of the 1900 All-Ireland Senior Hurling Championship, an inter-county hurling tournament for the top teams in Ireland. The match was held at Jones' Road, Dublin, on 26 October 1902 between London, represented by club side Desmonds, and Tipperary, represented by club side from Two-Mile-Borris. The London champions lost to their Munster opponents on a score line of 2–5 to 0–6.

== Match details ==
1902-10-26

Tipperary	2-5 – 0-6	London

Jones' Road, Dublin
Attendance: 8,000
Referee: John McCarthy (Kilkenny)
