= 1929 All-Ireland Senior Hurling Championship final =

1929 All-Ireland Senior Hurling Final
- Event: 1929 All-Ireland Senior Hurling Championship
Cork	Galway
4-9	1-3
- Date: 1 September 1929
- Venue: Croke Park, Dublin
- Referee: Seán Robbins (Offaly)
- Attendance: 14,000

The 1929 All-Ireland Senior Hurling Championship Final was the 42nd All-Ireland Final and the culmination of the 1929 All-Ireland Senior Hurling Championship, an inter-county hurling tournament for the top teams in Ireland. The match was held at Croke Park, Dublin, on 1 September 1929, between Cork and Galway. The Connacht men lost to their Munster opponents on a score line of 4–9 to 1–3.

== Match details ==
1929-09-01
15:15 UTC+1

Cork	4-9 – 1-3	Galway

Croke Park, Dublin
Attendance: 14,000
Referee: S. Robbins (Offaly)

Cork	Galway

Cork Team 1 Jeremiah Miah Burke 2 Morgan Madden 3 Edward Marie O'Connell 4 Johnny Kenneally 5 Paddy Balty Ahern 6 Jim Hurley 7 Paddy Fox Collins 8 Tom Barry 9 Dinny Barry Murphy 10 Paddy Delea 11 Eugene Eudie Coughlan 12 Michael Gah Ahern 13 Jim O'Regan 14 Peter Hawker O'Grady 15 Mick O'Connell Substitute Donal McCarthy for Paddy Balty Ahern Trainer Jim Tough Barry
