= 1917 All-Ireland Senior Hurling Championship final =

1917 All-Ireland Senior Hurling Final
- Event: 1917 All-Ireland Senior Hurling Championship
Dublin	Tipperary
5-4	4-2
- Date: 28 October 1917
- Venue: Croke Park, Dublin

The 1917 All-Ireland Senior Hurling Championship Final was the thirtieth All-Ireland Final and the culmination of the 1917 All-Ireland Senior Hurling Championship, an inter-county hurling tournament for the top teams in Ireland. Dublin were the winners. It took place on 28 October 1917.
