= 1910 All-Ireland Senior Hurling Championship final =

1910 All-Ireland Senior Hurling Final
- Event: 1910 All-Ireland Senior Hurling Championship
Wexford	Limerick
7-0	6-2
- Date: 20 November 1910
- Venue: Jones's Road, Dublin

The 1910 All-Ireland Senior Hurling Championship Final was the twenty-third All-Ireland Final and the culmination of the 1910 All-Ireland Senior Hurling Championship, an inter-county hurling tournament for the top teams in Ireland. Wexford were the winners.
