= 1905 All-Ireland Senior Hurling Championship final =

1905 All-Ireland Senior Hurling Final
- Event: 1905 All-Ireland Senior Hurling Championship
Kilkenny	Cork
7-7	2-9
- Date: 30 June 1907
- Venue: Fraher Field, Dungarvan
- Referee: MF Crowe (Dublin)

The 1905 All-Ireland Senior Hurling Championship Final was the 18th All-Ireland Final and the culmination of the 1905 All-Ireland Senior Hurling Championship, an inter-county hurling tournament for the top teams in Ireland. The match was held on 14 April 1907 between Cork and Kilkenny. Cork won the first game, but after an objection was raised about Cork keeper Daniel McCarthy being a reservist for the British Army, a replay was ordered, won by Kilkenny.

== Match details ==
14 April 1907

Cork	5-10 – 3-12	Kilkenny

Tipperary

30 June 1907
Replay

Kilkenny	7-7 – 2-9	Cork

Fraher Field, Dungarvan
