= 1908 All-Ireland Senior Hurling Championship final =

1908 All-Ireland Senior Hurling Final
- Event: 1908 All-Ireland Senior Hurling Championship
Tipperary	Dublin
3-15	1-5
- Date: 27 June 1909
- Venue: Geraldine Park, Athy

The 1908 All-Ireland Senior Hurling Championship Final was the 21st All-Ireland Final and the culmination of the 1908 All-Ireland Senior Hurling Championship, an inter-county hurling tournament for the top teams in Ireland. Tipperary were winners after a replay and extended their 100% record in All Ireland Finals to eight wins out of eight. This record came to an end when Tipperary got to the Final again in 1909 where they lost to Kilkenny.

== Match details ==
25 April 1909

Tipperary	2-5 – 1-8	Dublin

Croke Park, Dublin

27 June 1909
Replay

Tipperary	3-15 – 1-5	Dublin

Geraldine Park, Athy
