= 1982 All-Ireland Senior Hurling Championship final =

1982 All-Ireland Senior Hurling Final
- Event: 1982 All-Ireland Senior Hurling Championship
Kilkenny	Cork
3-18	1-13
- Date: 5 September 1982
- Venue: Croke Park, Dublin
- Referee: Noel O'Donoghue (Dublin)
- Attendance: 59,550

The 1982 All-Ireland Senior Hurling Championship Final was the 95th All-Ireland Final and the culmination of the 1982 All-Ireland Senior Hurling Championship, an inter-county hurling tournament for the top teams in Ireland. The match was held at Croke Park, Dublin, on 5 September 1982, between Kilkenny and Cork. Kilkenny defeated Cork on a score line of 3-18 to 1-13.

5 September
Final

Kilkenny	3–18 – 1–13	Cork
C. Heffernan (2–3), B. Fitzpatrick (0–6), G. Fennelly (1–1), R. Power (0–4), L. Fennelly (0–2), J. Hennessy (0–1), K. Brennan (0–1).	Report	P. Horgan (0–5), E. O'Donoghue (1–0), R. Cummins (0–3), T. Crowley (0–2), T. O'Sullivan (0–2), T. Cashman (0–1).

Croke Park, Dublin
Attendance: 59,550
Referee: N. O'Donoghue (Dublin)

Kilkenny	Cork
