= 1923 All-Ireland Senior Hurling Championship final =

1923 All-Ireland Senior Hurling Final
- Event: 1923 All-Ireland Senior Hurling Championship
Galway	Limerick
7-3	4-5
- Date: 14 September 1923
- Venue: Croke Park, Dublin
- Referee: P. Kennefick (Cork)
- Attendance: 7,000

The 1923 All-Ireland Senior Hurling Championship Final was the 36th All-Ireland Final and the culmination of the 1923 All-Ireland Senior Hurling Championship, an inter-county hurling tournament for the top teams in Ireland. The match was held at Croke Park, Dublin, on 14 September 1924, between Galway and Limerick. The Munster champions lost to the Connacht men on a score line of 7–3 to 4–5.

This was to be Galway's last all-Ireland triumph until 1980.

== Match details ==
1924-09-14
Final

Galway	7-3 – 4-5	Limerick

Croke Park, Dublin
Attendance: 7,000
Referee: P. Kennefick (Cork)

Galway	Limerick

Leonard McGrath with three goals was the game's top scorer and Galway were captained by Mick Kenny.

Galway wore the colours of Tynagh, blue and gold.

Galway Team 1 Junior Mahony 2 Tom Flemming 3 Jim Power 4 Mick Dervan 5 Mick Gill 6 Ed Gilmartin 7 James Staff Garvey 8 Mick Kenny 9 Jimmy Morris 10 Ignatius Harney 11 Dick Morrissey 12 Martin King 13 Leonard McGrath 14 Andy Kelly 15 Bernie Gibbs Trainers Jack Berry and Tom Kenny
