= 1983 All-Ireland Senior Hurling Championship final =

1983 All-Ireland Senior Hurling Final
- Event: 1983 All-Ireland Senior Hurling Championship
Kilkenny	Cork
2–14	2–12
- Date: 4 September 1983
- Venue: Croke Park, Dublin
- Referee: Neil Duggan (Limerick)
- Attendance: 58,381
- Weather: Dry

The 1983 All-Ireland Senior Hurling Championship Final was the 96th All-Ireland Final and the culmination of the 1983 All-Ireland Senior Hurling Championship, an inter-county hurling tournament for the top teams in Ireland. The match was held at Croke Park, Dublin, on 4 September 1983, between Kilkenny and Cork. The Munster champions lost to their Leinster opponents for a second consecutive year on a score line of 2–14 to 2–12. Kilkenny were captained by Liam Fennelly.

14 September
Final

Kilkenny	2–14 – 2–12	Cork
B. Fitzpatrick (0–10), R. Power (1–0), L. Fennelly (1–0), G. Henderson (0–2), C. Heffernan (0–1), H. Ryan (0–1).	Report	B. Óg Murphy (0–5), S. O'Leary (1–0), T. Mulcahy (1–0), J. Buckley (0–3), K. Hennessy (0–2), E. O'Donoghue (0–1), F. Collins (0–1).

Croke Park, Dublin
Attendance: 58,381
Referee: N. Duggan (Limerick)

Kilkenny	Cork
