= 1964 All-Ireland Senior Hurling Championship final =

1964 All-Ireland Senior Hurling Final
- Event: 1964 All-Ireland Senior Hurling Championship
Tipperary	Kilkenny
5–13	2–8
- Date: 6 September 1964
- Venue: Croke Park, Dublin
- Referee: A. Higgins (Galway)
- Attendance: 71,282

The 1964 All-Ireland Senior Hurling Championship Final was the 77th All-Ireland Final and the culmination of the 1964 All-Ireland Senior Hurling Championship, an inter-county hurling tournament for the top teams in Ireland. The match was held at Croke Park, Dublin, on 6 September 1964, between Tipperary and Kilkenny. The Leinster champions lost to their Munster opponents on a score line of 5–13 to 2–8.

== Match details ==
1964-09-06
15:15 UTC+1

Tipperary	5–13 – 2–8	Kilkenny

Croke Park, Dublin
Referee: A. Higgins (Galway)

Tipperary	Kilkenny
