= 1980 All-Ireland Senior Hurling Championship final =

1980 All-Ireland Senior Hurling Final
- Event: 1980 All-Ireland Senior Hurling Championship
Galway	Limerick
2-15	3-9
- Date: 7 September 1980
- Venue: Croke Park, Dublin
- Man of the Match: Michael Conneely
- Referee: Noel O'Donoghue (Dublin)
- Attendance: 64,895

The 1980 All-Ireland Senior Hurling Championship Final was the 93rd All-Ireland Final and the culmination of the 1980 All-Ireland Senior Hurling Championship, an inter-county hurling tournament for the top teams in Ireland. The match took place at Croke Park, Dublin, on 7 September 1980, between 1979 runners-up Galway and 1973 winners Limerick, and it was refereed by Noel O'Donoghue from Dublin. Galway captained by Joe Connolly and managed by Cyril Farrell won the game by 2–15 to 3–9.

== Background ==
This All-Ireland final was only the second ever meeting of Galway and Limerick in a championship decider. Galway triumphed to claim their second All-Ireland title. Limerick were lining out in their fourteenth All-Ireland final and were seeking their eight title, their first since defeating Kilkenny in 1973. Galway were appearing in their eleventh All-Ireland decider and their second in succession since losing to Kilkenny in 1979.

== Pre-match ==
=== Referee ===
Dublin-based referee Noel O'Donoghue was named as the referee for the 1980 All-Ireland final. Although a talented rugby union player at schools' level, O'Donoghue was also a founder-member of the St. Begnet's club in Dalkey. This was the first All-Ireland senior final for the 40-year-old referee. O'Donoghue's other experience includes the All-Ireland minor final of 1979, Railway Cup finals, provincial finals, county finals and National Hurling League finals. He was also very active in administrative affairs as secretary of the Dublin referees committee.

== Broadcasting ==
The All-Ireland final was broadcast in Ireland on RTÉ 1 with Micheál Ó Muircheartaigh and Michael O'Hehir providing the commentary. The programme ran from 1.20pm until 5.00pm and included basic coverage of both the All-Ireland minor and senior finals. An hour of highlights of the games were shown on The Sunday Game on the same channel at 9.15pm.

== Match ==
=== First half ===
The match began at a quick pace. After just two-and-a-half minutes the ball broke loose about 25 yards out from the Limerick goal. Bernie Forde collected and went on a solo-run before kicking the ball past Tommy Quaid and into the Limerick net for the first goal of the day. Five minutes later Joe Connolly was fouled just outside the 21-yard line. He pointed from the resultant free to give Galway a four-point lead. It was all Galway at this early stage as Michael Connolly sent in a good cross to the far post from the Hogan Stand side where it was collected by an unchallenged P. J. Molloy. He made no mistake in sending the ball into the net to put Galway 2–1 to no score up. Limerick's response was immediate. A high lob towards the left of the square saw Éamonn Cregan get in a neat overhead strike to send the ball into the net for his sides' first goal of the game. Two minutes later Cregan added a point from a free to put Limerick back on track. Cregan was a one-man show at this stage. A minute later a great ball out of defence by Mossie Carroll found Cregan down on the left wing. A cheeky dummy fooled full-back Conor Hayes before Cregan popped over a point from 45 yards. Galway responded with a succession of neat points. John Connolly and Noel Lane all got their names on the score sheet. Cregan stepped up again to respond for Limerick with a point from 55 yards. Joe Connolly negated this point almost immediately. His brother John then got one of the scores of the day when he pointed from 50 yards out on the touch line. Brian Carroll, who had just entered the play, then popped up to become Limerick's second scorer with a point. Both sides exchanged points in the final minute, courtesy of Cregan and Lane. At half-time the score read Galway 2–7, Limerick 1–5.

=== Details ===
7 September
15:15 UTC+1
Final

Galway	2-15 – 3-9	Limerick
B. Forde (1–5), Joe Connolly (0–4), P. J. Molloy (1–0), N. Lane (0–3), John Connolly (0–2), J. Ryan (0–1).		E. Cregan (2–7), J. McKenna (1–1), B. Carroll (0–1).

Croke Park, Dublin
Attendance: 64,895
Referee: N. O'Donoghue (Dublin)

Galway	Limerick

Galway Team 1 Michael Conneely 2 Conor Hayes 3 Niall McInerney 4 Jimmy Cooney 5 Sylvie Linnane 6 Sean Silke 7 Seamus Coen 8 Michael Connolly 9 Steve Mahon 10 Frank Burke 11 Joe Connolly 12 PJ Molloy 13 Bernie Forde 14 John Connolly 15 Noel Lane Substitutes Finbarr Gantley for Michael Connolly John Ryan for PJ Molloy Manager Cyril Farrell
