= 1970 All-Ireland Senior Hurling Championship final =

1970 All-Ireland Senior Hurling Final
- Event: 1970 All-Ireland Senior Hurling Championship
| Cork | Wexford |
| 6-21 | 5-10 |
- Date: 6 September 1970
- Venue: Croke Park, Dublin
- Referee: Jimmy Hatton (Wicklow)
- Attendance: 65,062

The 1970 All-Ireland Senior Hurling Championship Final was the 83rd All-Ireland final and the culmination of the 1970 All-Ireland Senior Hurling Championship, an inter-county hurling tournament for the top teams in Ireland. The match took place on 6 September 1970, at Croke Park, Dublin. The match was contested by 1968 winners Wexford and 1969 runners-up Cork, and it was refereed by Jimmy Hatton from Wicklow.

== Background ==
The All-Ireland final was the fourth meeting of Cork and Wexford in a championship decider. Cork held the balance of power in all previous meetings between the two, having recorded three All-Ireland victories to Wexford's sole triumph over 'the Rebels'. Both sides last met in the All-Ireland final of 1956 when Wexford recorded their first-ever championship victory over Cork. That game has gone down as one of the greatest finals of all-time. Wexford enjoyed a hugely successful decade in the 1960s. They reached four All-Ireland finals and played Tipperary in every one of them. Both teams recorded two victories apiece with Wexford claiming the Liam MacCarthy Cup in 1960 and 1968. Cork's sole All-Ireland title of the decade came in 1966, a full twelve years after their previous All-Ireland triumph. Moreover, Cork had lost the All-Ireland final of 1969. The thought of losing a second championship decider in succession proved a great motivation.

In 1966, Cork triumphed over Kilkenny in the All-Ireland final to claim their 20th title, leaving them one behind Tipperary in the roll of honour. A victory for Cork would put them level with Tipperary, while a victory for Wexford would give them their 6th All-Ireland title and bring them level with Dublin and Limerick in joint fourth position in the all-time roll of honour.

== Pre-match ==
=== Referee ===
Kilcoole-born referee Jimmy Hatton was named as the referee for the 1971 All-Ireland final on 1 September 1970. He was one of the most distinguished referees in both hurling and Gaelic football. This was Hatton's fifth time taking charge of an All-Ireland final. His previous experience includes the hurling decider between Kilkenny and Waterford in 1963, the football final between Galway and Kerry in 1964 and both All-Ireland finals in 1966, Cork versus Kilkenny in the hurling and Galway against Meath in the football. Hatton announced his retirement from refereeing in 1969 but was persuaded to change his mind at the beginning of 1970.

=== Teams ===
Cork were appearing in their second consecutive All-Ireland final, however, there were eight personnel and positional changes from the team that were defeated by Kilkenny in 1969. A feature of the Wexford team was the presence of four Quigley brothers, Dan, John, Martin and Pat, all in the starting fifteen.

=== 80-minute final ===
Before the sliotar had even been thrown in the match was to go down in history as it was the first 80-minute All-Ireland final ever played. All games up to 1970 had been just 60 minutes in duration.

== Match ==
=== First half ===
Those expecting the Cork-Wexford clash to be in the same vein as the 1954 and 1956 championship deciders were sorely disappointed. The All-Ireland final, however, saw Wexford routed in an ill-tempered game by a highly efficient and more determined Cork. Cork's scorer-in-chief Charlie McCarthy opened the scoring after just three minutes when he captured the first point of the day. Mick Butler responded in kind just a minute later, before Tony Doran crashed the ball into the Cork net from 25 yards to capture Wexford's first goal of the day. The next fifteen minutes saw Cork respond. Three unanswered points brought the teams back level before Eddie O'Brien scored his side's first goal of the day after eleven minutes. Wexford failed to respond and Cork stretched their lead with two more points. Seventeen minutes after their last score Wexford's Dan Quigley scored a sensational goal from 75 yards to narrow the gap. The Wexford comeback was short-lived as Charlie McCarthy tapped over another point before Charlie Cullinane scored Cork's second goal of the day following a rebound from the Wexford 'keeper. Two more Cork points followed before Eddie O'Brien popped up to score his second and Cork's third goal of the game. Two more points for Cork quickly followed. With two minutes left until the interval Pat Quigley found himself five yards away from the Cork goal and duly sent the ball crashing to the net for Wexford's third green flag of the game. Willie Walsh pointed for Cork before Mick Butler, the man who got Wexford's first score of the half, heralded half-time with another. At the interval Cork had built up a ten-point lead, 3-12 to 3-2.

=== Second half ===
Cork showed no sign of relaxing in the second-half. After just 90 seconds of play Willie Walsh had the ball in the Wexford net after a goalmouth melee. Both sides exchanged tit-for-tat scores after this before Charlie McCarthy palmed the ball into the net for Cork's fifth goal of the day. Wexford launched another attack, resulting in a point for Tom Byrne and a second goal of the game for Pat Quigley. Once again Wexford failed to maintain this and three quick Cork points put some more daylight between the teams. Tony Doran narrowed the deficit with another goal from close range, however, Cork fought back with a brace of points from McCarthy and Tomás Ryan. Eddie O'Brien, Cork's hero of the game, popped up yet again to claim his hat-trick after an hour of play. Dave Bernie responded with a point before Tomás Ryan got Cork's 21st and final point of the match. Wexford scored four unanswered points in the last five minutes, however, it was too little too late as Cork were the runaway winners of the game.

=== Details ===
6 September
3:30pm

| Cork | 6-21 – 5-10 | Wexford |
|---|---|---|
| C. McCarthy (1-9), E. O'Brien (3-1), T. Ryan (0-6), W. Walsh (1-2), C. Cullinane (1-0), G. McCarthy (0-2), R. Cummins (0-1). | | P. Quigley (2-0), T. Doran (2-0), D. Quigley (1-0), D. Bernie (0-3), M. Butler (0-3), T. Byrne (0-2), M. Browne (0-1), M. Jacob (0-1). |

Croke Park, Dublin
Attendance: 65,062
Referee: J. Hatton (Wicklow)

| Cork | Wexford |

Cork Team 1 Paddy Barry 2 Tony Maher 3 Pat McDonnell 4 John Horgan 5 Donal Clifford 6 Pat Hegarty 7 Con Roche 8 Gerald McCarthy 9 Seamus Looney 10 Tomas Ryan 11 Willie Walsh 12 Charlie Cullinane 13 Charlie McCarthy 14 Ray Cummins 15 Eddie O'Brien Substitutes Simon Murphy for Donal Clifford Unused Substitutes Martin Coleman, Joe Murphy, Denis Coughlan, Fr Seanie Barry Trainer Jim O'Regan Selectors Willie Campbell, Pat O'Leary, Charlie O'Flaherty, Dan O'Mahony

== Aftermath ==
Eddie O'Brien's hat-trick was the last in an All-Ireland SHC final until Lar Corbett's for Tipperary in the 2010 All-Ireland Senior Football Championship final.
