= 1915 All-Ireland Senior Hurling Championship final =

1915 All-Ireland Senior Hurling Final
- Event: 1915 All-Ireland Senior Hurling Championship
Laois	Cork
6-2	4-1
- Date: 24 October 1915
- Venue: Croke Park, Dublin
- Referee: Willie Walsh (Waterford)
- Attendance: 14,000
- Weather: rainy

The 1915 All-Ireland Senior Hurling Championship Final was the twenty-eighth All-Ireland Final and the culmination of the All-Ireland Senior Hurling Championship, an inter-county hurling tournament for the top teams in Ireland. Ballygeehan representing Laois defeated Redmonds from Cork in the final to record Laois's first All-Ireland title.

According to the book "Twenty Years of the GAA 1910-1930" compiled by Phil O'Neill "the game was well up to final standard, although heavy rain fell in the second period, which marred the display to some extent and made it difficult for the players to keep their feet and their hurleys".

At half time Cork led by 3-0 to 2-2 with goals from 'Major' Kennedy, Paddy O'Halloran and Larry Flaherty but four second half goals from Laois, which included three goals by Jack Hiney, secured their win.

Leix wore black and amber hoops while Cork wore yellow jerseys.

== Links ==
- gaa.ie
- rte.ie
- laoisgaa.ie
