= 1979 All-Ireland Senior Hurling Championship final =

1979 All-Ireland Senior Hurling Final
- Event: 1979 All-Ireland Senior Hurling Championship
Kilkenny	Galway
2–12	1–8
- Date: 2 September 1979
- Venue: Croke Park, Dublin
- Referee: George Ryan (Tipperary)
- Attendance: 53,535

The 1979 All-Ireland Senior Hurling Championship Final was a hurling match that was played at Croke Park, Dublin on 2 September 1979 to determine the winners of the 1979 All-Ireland Senior Hurling Championship, the 93rd season of the All-Ireland Senior Hurling Championship, a tournament organised by the Gaelic Athletic Association for the champion teams of the three hurling provinces of Ireland. The final was contested by Kilkenny of Leinster and Galway of Connacht, with Kilkenny winning by 2–12 to 1–8.

The All-Ireland final between Kilkenny and Galway was the 20th championship meeting between the two teams. Kilkenny were appearing in their 7th final in ten years and were the runners-up of the previous year, while Galway were lining out in their second All-Ireland decider in five years.

Kilkenny's All-Ireland victory was their fourth in ten years and their first since 1975. The win gave them their 21st All-Ireland title overall.

Galway's All-Ireland defeat was their 9th since last winning the title in 1923.

== Match ==
=== Details ===
2 September

Kilkenny	2–12 – 1–8	Galway
L O'Brien (1–7), M Brennan (1–1), M Crotty (0–1), K Fennelly (0–1), J Hennessy (0–1), B Fitzpatrick (0–1).		N Lane (1–0), PJ Molloy (0–3), F Gantley (0–2), Joe Connolly (0–2), S Mahon (0–1).

Croke Park, Dublin
Attendance: 53,535
Referee: George Ryan (Tipperary)

Kilkenny	Galway
