= 1965 All-Ireland Senior Hurling Championship final =

1965 All-Ireland Senior Hurling Final
- Event: 1965 All-Ireland Senior Hurling Championship
Tipperary	Wexford
2-16	0-10
- Date: 5 September 1965
- Venue: Croke Park, Dublin
- Referee: M. Hayes (Clare)
- Attendance: 67,498

The 1965 All-Ireland Senior Hurling Championship Final was the 78th All-Ireland Final and the culmination of the 1965 All-Ireland Senior Hurling Championship, an inter-county hurling tournament for the top teams in Ireland. The match was held at Croke Park, Dublin, on 5 September 1965, between Wexford and Tipperary. The Leinster champions lost to their Munster opponents on a score line of 2–16 to 0–10.

== Match details ==
1965-09-05
15:15 UTC+1

Tipperary	2-16 – 0-10	Wexford

Croke Park, Dublin
Attendance: 67,498
Referee: M. Hayes (Clare)

Tipperary	Wexford
