= 1962 All-Ireland Senior Hurling Championship final =

1962 All-Ireland Senior Hurling Final
- Event: 1962 All-Ireland Senior Hurling Championship
Tipperary	Wexford
3–10	2–11
- Date: 2 September 1962
- Venue: Croke Park, Dublin
- Referee: J. Dowling (Offaly)
- Attendance: 75,039

The 1962 All-Ireland Senior Hurling Championship Final was the 75th All-Ireland Final and the culmination of the 1962 All-Ireland Senior Hurling Championship, an inter-county hurling tournament for the top teams in Ireland. The match was held at Croke Park, Dublin, on 2 September 1962, between Tipperary and Wexford. The Leinster champions lost to their Munster opponents on a score line of 3–10 to 2–11.

This was the first All-Ireland final to be broadcast live by Teilifís Éireann.

== Match details ==
2 September 1962
15:15 UTC+1

Tipperary	3–10 – 2–11	Wexford

Croke Park, Dublin
Attendance: 75,039
Referee: J. Dowling (Offaly)

Tipperary	Wexford
