= 1987 All-Ireland Senior Hurling Championship final =

1987 All-Ireland Senior Hurling Final
- Event: 1987 All-Ireland Senior Hurling Championship
Galway	Kilkenny
1–12	0–9
- Date: 6 September 1987
- Venue: Croke Park, Dublin
- Referee: Terence Murray (Limerick)
- Attendance: 65,596

The 1987 All-Ireland Senior Hurling Championship Final was the 100th All-Ireland Final and the culmination of the 1987 All-Ireland Senior Hurling Championship, an inter-county hurling tournament for the top teams in Ireland. The match was held at Croke Park, Dublin, on 6 September 1987, between Galway and Kilkenny. The Leinster champions lost to the Connacht men on a score line of 1–12 to 0–9. It was Galway's third Final success (1923 and 1980 being the other victories). They came in to this game having lost fourteen previous finals. Cyril Farrell and Pat Henderson managed Galway and Kilkenny respectively. Galway went on to successfully defend their title the following year, again captained by Conor Hayes.

== Match ==
=== Summary ===
he half-time score was Galway 0.5 to 0.4 Kilkenny. 41st-minute substitute Noel Lane, set up by Joe Cooney after a long solo run by Eanna Ryan, scored the only goal of the game in the 63rd minute to make it 1.11 to 0.9. Kilkenny's first score from play arrived in the first minute of the 2nd half. Tony Keady scored the last point of the game in the 69th minute. Conor Hayes, aged 29, of the Kiltormer club, captained the Galway team. Ger Canning, on RTE television commentary called it "one of the poorest All-Ireland hurling finals (he'd) seen". This completed a League and Championship double for Galway.

=== Match details ===
1987 All-Ireland Senior Hurling Final
1987-09-06
Final

Galway	1–12 – 0–9	Kilkenny
J. Cooney (0–5), N. Lane (1–0), S. Mahon (0–2), T. Keady (0–2), M. McGrath (0–1), M. Naughton (0–1), A. Cunningham (0–1).		G. Fennelly (0–7), H. Ryan (0–1), T. Lennon (0–1).

Croke Park, Dublin
Attendance: 65,596
Referee: T. Murray (Limerick)

Galway	Kilkenny

Galway Team 1 John Commins 2 Sylvie Linnane 3 Conor Hayes 4 Ollie Kilkenny 5 Peter Finnerty 6 Tony Keady 7 Gerry McInerney 8 Steve Mahon 9 Pat Malone 10 Michael Hopper McGrath 11 Joe Cooney 12 Martin Naughton 13 Eanna Ryan 14 Brendan Lynskey 15 Anthony Cunningham Substitutes Noel Lane for Martin Naughton Tony Kilkenny for Michael McGrath PJ Molloy for Anthony Cunningham Manager Cyril Farrell Selectors Bernie O'Connor Phelim Murphy
