= 1985 All-Ireland Senior Hurling Championship final =

1985 All-Ireland Senior Hurling Final
- Event: 1985 All-Ireland Senior Hurling Championship
Offaly	Galway
2–11	1–12
- Date: 1 September 1985
- Venue: Croke Park, Dublin
- Referee: George Ryan (Tipperary)
- Attendance: 61,451

The 1985 All-Ireland Senior Hurling Championship Final was the 98th All-Ireland Final and the culmination of the 1985 All-Ireland Senior Hurling Championship, an inter-county hurling tournament for the top teams in Ireland. The match was held at Croke Park, Dublin, on 1 September 1985, between Offaly and Galway. The Connacht men lost to their Leinster opponents on a score line of 2–11 to 1–12.

== Match details ==
1985-09-01
Final

Offaly	2–11 – 1–12	Galway

Croke Park, Dublin
Attendance: 61,451
Referee: George Ryan (Tipperary)

Offaly	Galway

Offaly Team 1 Jim Troy 2 Aidan Fogarty 3 Eugene Coughlan 4 Pat Fleury 5 Tom Cooneely 6 Pat Delaney 7 Ger Coughlan 8 Danny Owens 9 Joachim Kelly 10 Paddy Corrigan 11 Brendan Bermingham 12 Mark Corrigan 13 Pat Cleary 14 Padraig Horan 15 Joe Dooley Substitutes Declan Fogarty for Danny Owens Brendan Keesham for Tom Cooneely Manager Dermot Healy Trainer Andy Gallagher
