= 1981 All-Ireland Senior Hurling Championship final =

1981 All-Ireland Senior Hurling Final
- Event: 1981 All-Ireland Senior Hurling Championship
Offaly	Galway
2–12	0–15
- Date: 6 September 1981
- Venue: Croke Park, Dublin
- Referee: Frank Murphy (Cork)
- Attendance: 71,348

The 1981 All-Ireland Senior Hurling Championship Final was the 94th All-Ireland Final and the culmination of the 1981 All-Ireland Senior Hurling Championship, an inter-county hurling tournament for the top teams in Ireland. The match was held at Croke Park, Dublin, on 6 September 1981, between Galway and Offaly. The reigning champions lost to their Leinster opponents, who won their first senior hurling title, on a score line of 2–12 to 0–15.

Johnny Flaherty scored a handpassed goal in this game; this was before the handpassed goal was ruled out of the game as hurling's technical standards improved.

== Match details ==
1981-09-06
Final

Offaly	2–12 – 0–15	Galway

Croke Park, Dublin
Attendance: 71,348
Referee: F. Murphy (Cork)

Offaly	Galway
