= History of Tipperary GAA =

The Tipperary County Board of the Gaelic Athletic Association (GAA) (Irish: Cumann Luthchleas Gael Coiste Contae Tiobraid Árann) is one of the 32 county boards of the GAA in Ireland, and is responsible for Gaelic games in County Tipperary and the Tipperary county teams.

The County Tipperary holds an honoured place in the history of the GAA as the organisation was founded in Hayes' Hotel, Thurles, on 1 November 1884. There follow details of the events of its history and the achievements of its teams in inter county competition.

== Hurling ==
=== Many firsts ===
- The first team to win the All Ireland senior hurling title in 1887 against Galway.
- The first GAA president was a Tipperary man named Maurice Davin, from Carrick-on-Suir, in south Tipperary.
- First Munster & All-Ireland Under-21 Hurling Championship in 1964.
- The first club to win the All Ireland club title was Roscrea, a club in north Tipperary.
- The first GAA Congress was held in Hayes' Hotel in Thurles.
- The first GAA supporters club in Ireland was established for Tipperary senior hurling.
- The first GAA supporters website in Ireland was Premierview. Launched in 2001.
- The first autobiography of a hurler was that of Tommy Doyle 'A Lifetime in Hurling', which was published in 1955.
- Only team in GAA history to win an All Ireland title in every decade since 1887
- Won the Hurling-Football Double twice in 1895 and 1900, 90 years before Cork finally caught up in 1990.
- In 1895 Tipp was the first county to win an All-Ireland final at Jones Road, which would later become Croke Park.
- In 1895, Tipp became the only county to win the All-Ireland Senior hurling and football double on the same day and repeated the feat in 1900. This will never happen again due to the finals now being played on separate days.
- In 1887, Tipp was the only county to bring off the first inter-county double by Beating Clare in both hurling and football on the same day in Nenagh.
- Won the Senior, Minor and Junior All Ireland's in 1930 to become the first county in hurling or football to win 3 All Ireland's in one year, otherwise known as the Grand Slam.
- Tipp is the only county to have twice won the Senior hurling and two other grades in the same year (1930, 1989)
- Tipp is the first county to win 3 Minor All Ireland Hurling titles consecutively: 1932, 1933 and 1934.
- In 1967, the team was the first to lead the Roll of Honour in every present hurling Grade (Senior, Intermediate, Minor and Under-21).
- Tipp won the first Intermediate Munster final in 1961
- Tipp won the first Junior Munster Hurling final in 1910
- John Doyle Has 8 All-Ireland Senior hurling medals, tied with the great Christy Ring
- John Doyle was the first hurler to win 10 Munster Senior hurling Championship medals, now tied with Jimmy Barry-Murphy.
- John Doyle also holds 11 National Hurling League medals, which is unrivalled
- Jimmy Doyle is the only player to contest 4 Minor All Ireland Hurling finals and the only to win 3 Minor All Ireland hurling medals.#
- Jimmy Doyle is the only player to have won 4 Munster Minor hurling medals.
- Tony Wall became the first player to receive the Texaco Hurler of the Year award in 1958.
- Tipp won the first All-Ireland Junior Football Championship final in 1912.
- Tipp won the first Munster Junior Football Championship final in 1910.
- Tipp won the first Munster Senior Football Championship final in 1888.
- Tipp won the first Munster Senior Ladies' Football Championship final and All-Ireland Senior Ladies' Football Championship finals in 1974.
- Tipp were also the first county to win back to back All Ireland Senior Ladies Football Championship (1974–1975)
- In 1911, Tipp became the first county to win back to back Munster Junior hurling titles.
- In 1963, Tipp became the first Munster county to win the All-Ireland Intermediate hurling championship.
- In 1889, Tipp became the first county to win both All-Ireland Senior Hurling & Football titles, in 1887 (Hurling) and 1889 (Football)
- In 1934, Tipp were the first county to win the Munster Minor hurling and football in the same year.
- In 1934, Tipp were the first county to win the All-Ireland Minor hurling and football in the same year.
- In 1961, Tipp were the first county to win the Munster Senior and Intermediate hurling titles in the same year
- In 1965, Tipp were the first county to win back to back Munster Under-21 titles.
- In 1964, Tipp were the first county to win the Munster Senior and Under-21 hurling titles in the same year
- In 1965, Tipp were the first county to win the Munster Senior and Under-21 hurling titles in the same year, back to back.
- in 1965, Tipp became the first Munster and Irish county to win back to back All-Ireland Intermediate hurling titles. London had won back to back titles beforehand.
- In 1n 1991, Tipp became the first county to win 4 Munster Junior hurling titles consecutively (1988–1991) Cork had won three titles in a row from 58 to 60 and then the competition was halted. When the competition was reinstated in 1983, Cork won the first two making it 5 titles in a row, but is not counted due to the halt in the running of the competition.
- The only GAA president that served two terms was a Tipp man Maurice Davin, from Carrick on Suir
- Tipp were the first hurling county to win back to back Doubles (National League and All-Ireland Senior Hurling title) (1949–1950)
- Feile na nGael was a Tipperary brainchild and was held for the first time in Thurles in 1971.
- The first radio broadcast of a G.A.A. game was of the replay of the Munster Senior Hurling Championship game between Cork and Tipperary at Thurles in 1926.
- Tipp was the first hurling county to reach the All-Ireland Senior Hurling Championship Final through the back door, but lost to Clare. This was in 1997, the first year of the new system.
- Tipp became the first county to have held the All-Ireland Senior championship in Hurling, Football, Camogie and Ladies' Football in 1999 and are only joined by Cork and Galway in achieving this feat, though both of these achieved this after Tipp.
- In 1964, Tipp became the first hurling county in Munster to have won all inter-county Munster titles (Senior, Minor, Under-21, Intermediate and Junior)
- In 1964, Tipp became the first hurling county to have won all inter-county All-Ireland titles (Senior, Minor, Under-21, Intermediate and Junior).
- Johnny Leahy holds the record for captaining the most teams to Munster Senior glory (5 times)
- Johnny Leahy is the only man to captain a winning All-Ireland team before and after the McCarthy cup was introduced in 1921
- Philip Kennedy of Nenagh Éire Óg was the first man to captain any team to either 2 or back to back All-Ireland Under-21 titles. Dan Murphy (Cork) equalled this in 1998. In 1980, PJ Maxwell was captain of the Under-21s, he was injured for the final, so Philip lifted the trophy as final captain.
- Jimmy Doyle (6 Senior and 3 Minor, John Doyle (8 Senior, 1 Minor) and Christy Ring (8 Senior and 1 Minor) are the only players to have won 9 All-Ireland medals won on the field of play.
- Babs Keating and Mick Roche were the first players to have played in an All-Ireland final in all present grades (Senior, Intermediate, Minor and Under-21)
- John (10 Senior and 2 Minor) and Jimmy Doyle (8 Senior and 4 Minor) are the only players to have started 12 All-Ireland finals. Jimmy Doyle came on as a sub in 1971, which makes him the player with the most All-Ireland appearances with 13.
- Thurles Sarsfields is the only club in Ireland to have provided 10 All-Ireland Senior hurling winning captains
- Tipperary also has the unique distinction that they were the last winners of the original Liam MacCarthy Cup in 1991.
- Tipperary has the unique distinction of being the only county to have won All-Ireland senior titles in Hurling, Football, Camogie, Ladies' Football, Hardball singles and doubles, Softball singles and doubles and 40x20 singles and doubles. This means Tipp have won a Senior All-Ireland title in all 5 Major Senior competitions in the GAA (Rounders being the exception as there is no Senior inter-county competition)
- Eoin Kelly is the only player to have been Young hurler of the year two times in a row (2001–2002).
- To date, Tipp has had the most Young hurlers of the year (5), Eugene O'Neill in 1997 Eoin Kelly in 2001 and 2002, Noel McGrath in 2009 and Brendan Maher in 2010. The nearest is Cork with 3 and Kilkenny and Galway with 2 each.
- Tipp were the first county to have back to back Young hurlers of the year. Eoin Kelly in 2001 and 2002. Cork finally got 2 in a row with Setanta O'hAilpin in 2003 and Brian Murphy in 2004.
- Tipp is the only county to twice have back to back Young hurlers of the year. Eoin Kelly 2001–2002 and Noel McGrath (2009) and Brendan Mahr (2010)
- Nenagh's W.J. Spain was the first player to have won both an All-Ireland Senior hurling and Senior football medal. Although these weren't with Tipperary, he won his Senior Football medal with Limerick (1887) and his Senior Hurling medal with Dublin (1889).
- Brendan Cummins holds the record for least Pucks (48) in the Poc Fada competition. He is the only Tipperary man to have won the competition.
- In 1926, the Tipp senior hurling team made the first ever trip to America. This was the first tour of its kind by an All-Ireland winning team.
- In 1910, along with Cork, Tipp were the first team to embark on a European tour
- Mikey Maher of Tubberadoora was the first man to captain a team to 3 All-Ireland victories (1895, 1896, 1898)
- In 1974, Tipp acquired the distinction of topping the roll of honour in three out of the four Senior codes at different times. (Hurling, Football and Ladies Football).
- In 1895, Tipp club Arravale Rovers, who represented Tipp in 1895, were in the first All-Ireland Senior Football final played at Jones Road (Now Croke Park). They also have the distinction of winning the first All-Ireland Senior Football final at Jones Road.
- Tipp hold the record for being in the most consecutive Munster minor hurling finals, 9 in a row from 1980 to 1988 (not including the replay in 1986).
- From 1930 to 1935, Tipp became the first county to win 6 Munster minor titles in a row, they completed it again from 1952 to 1957 and are the only county to do it twice. Cork have won 7 in a row, but after these two occurrences.
- Tipp were the first county to win 8 Minor munster titles in a single decade, winning them in the 1950s (50, 52, 53, 54, 55, 56, 57, 59). Cork finally achieved the same feat in the 1970s.
- Tipp also has a remarkable record in Munster minor hurling as from 1945 to 1962, they never went two years without winning the Munster title. They won 15 out of a possible 18 finals, only missing out on making the final twice and losing it once.
- Tipp is also the only county to feature in 50 munster minor finals (58 in all), winning more than half with 36 and losing 22.
- Tipp is the only county to win 6 All-Ireland Minor hurling titles in a single decade in the 1950s. They won in 52, 53, 55, 56, 57 and 59. This means they have won the most Minor titles in a single decade.
- Declan Carr and Tommy Carr are the only brothers to have won All-Stars in different codes. (Declan in hurling with Tipperary and Tommy in football with Dublin).
- Jovita Delaney became the first player to win an All-Star in camogie.
- Tipp became the first county to have an All-star in every code (1971 in Hurling, 1980 in Ladies Football, 1998 in Men's Football and 2003 in Camogie). Cork can also claim this, but in terms of position, Tipp were the first.
- Tipp and Cork are also the counties to have players featured on the first All-Star teams. Tipp had players on the first Hurling, Ladies Football and Camogie teams, while Cork had players on the first Hurling, Men's Football and Camogie teams. Tipp have an advantage on Cork, they had a player on the first Cú Chulainn hurling team in 1963. So officially, Tipp have players on 4 first teams and is a record by itself.
- Tipp became the first county to be in Three Senior Ladies football All-Ireland finals in a row, losing two in 1978, 1979 before winning in 1980.
- In 1980, Tipp became the first county to win Three All-Ireland Under-16 Ladies football titles in a row and in 1981, became the first county to be in 4 finals in a row.
- In 1962, Tipp became the first county to have two hurlers of the year in a row (Liam Devaney in 1961 and Donie Nealon in 1962).
- In 2001, Tommy Dunne became the first GPA hurler of the year.
- In 1931, Tipp became the first county to play under floodlights. This happened on their tour of America when Tipp played a team drawn from many parts of California in San Francisco. Tipp won 7–5 to 5–4.
- In 1945, Tipp beat Cork in the Munster semi-final. Tipp became the first hurling county to stop another at any stage from getting five All-Ireland titles in a row.
- In 1900, Tipp became the first county to play in both a 'Home' All-Ireland final and Real All-Ireland in both hurling and football. They beat London in both real finals and beat Galway in the 'Home' hurling and football final.
- Tipp are only county to hold a team scoreless in both an All-Ireland Senior Hurling and football final. Tipp beat Galway in the hurling in 1887 (1–1 to 0–0) and beat Laois (3–6 to 0–0) in the football in 1889. Tipp also held Galway Scoreless in the 1975 All-Ireland Senior ladies football final too, with the score of 1–4 to 0–0.
- JJ Callanan (Thurles Sarsfields) is the only man to have captained a team to an All-Ireland senior hurling title (1930) and then refereed an All-Ireland senior hurling final (1940).
- In 2010, Shannon Rovers became the first club to win back to back St. Jude's All-Ireland Junior hurling seven's titles.
- In 2010, Tipp (For the second time) became the county to stop a team going for 5 titles in a row, Cork (1941–1944) and Kilkenny (2006–2009).
- In 2010, Tipp took part in the first All-Ireland Under-21 Final to be held Under floodlights. They also won it.
- Tipp also have the biggest ever win in an All-Ireland Senior hurling final. In 1896, Tipp beat Dublin 8–14 to 0–4, which was a 34-point difference.
- Tipp also have the most players to have won an All-Ireland Senior hurling medal in three different decades with 4, Paddy 'Balty Ahern for Cork and Frank Cummins and Dick Grace for Kilkenny are the only others;
  - Tommy Doyle (1937, 1945, 1949, 1950, 1951)
  - John Doyle (1949, 1950, 1951, 1958, 1961, 1962, 1964, 1965)
  - Jimmy Doyle (1958, 1961, 1962, 1964, 1965, 1971)
  - Declan Ryan (1989, 1991, 2001)
- Brendan Cummins, with 73 Senior Championship appearances holds the record for the most hurling championship appearances ever.
- Tipp have the biggest score in an All-Ireland Under-21 hurling final with 5–22 against Galway in 2010
- In 2010, Tipp became the first team to lose the first championship game of the year and still go on to win the All-Ireland Senior hurling championship. This was almost achieved in 2002 by Clare, who were beaten by Tipp in their first Munster game and went on to lose the All-Ireland final to Kilkenny.
- In 1937, Tipp won the 50th All-Ireland Senior hurling final, beating Kilkenny, 3–11 to 0–3
- In 1962, Tipp won the 75th All-Ireland Senior hurling final, beating Wexford 3–10 to 2–11
- In 1964, Tipp won the 75th Munster Senior hurling final, beating Cork 3–13 to 1–5
- In 1989, Tipp won the 100th Munster Senior hurling final beating Waterford 0–26 to 2–8
- In 2010, Lar Corbett became the first hurler to score 3 goals in a 70 Minute All-Ireland Senior hurling final.

=== Beginnings ===
1887 – The inaugural All-Ireland senior hurling final was played on Easter Sunday 1888 in Birr, County Offaly. Galway were Tipp's opponents. Early in the game one of the Thurles players received facial injuries when he fell on his hurley and had to retire from the game. Thurles, the Tipp representatives, scored a point after eleven minutes and led by that score at half-time. With no number of points equalling a goal in those days the destination of the very first All-Ireland hurling title was wide open. Tipperary won on a score line of 1 goal, 1 point and 1 forfeit point to Galway's no score.

=== Tipp's first period of dominance (1895–1900) ===
In this period, Tipperary won 5 out of 7 Senior All-Irelands. They were the first 'dominant' team.

Two in a row-

1895 – Tipp stormed to the provincial title and into the All-Ireland final where Kilkenny were the opponents in the first championship decider to be played at what is now Croke Park. Tipp took a commanding 1–6 to 1–0 lead at half-time and went on to hammer 'the Cats' by 6–8 to 1–10 at the final whistle. Tipperary's Paddy Riordan is said to have scored all but one point of his team's total.

1896 – Tipperary were the masters of the hurling world once again. After securing a second consecutive Munster title the team lined out against Dublin in the All-Ireland final. Tipp scored a goal in the very first minute and took a remarkable 4–6 to 0–1 lead at half-time. The game turned into a rout as Tipperary won easily by 8–14 to 0–4. This game still holds the record as the most one-sided All-Ireland final of all time.

Three in a row-

1898 – After losing their Munster title to Limerick in 1897, Tipperary reclaimed the provincial title in 1898 and qualified for an All-Ireland final showdown with Kilkenny. In a high-scoring and exciting game Kilkenny were on top for the first twenty-five minutes. In the second-half Tipp took the upper-hand with captain Mikey Maher scoring three goals. A huge 7–13 to 3–10 score line gave Tipp the victory.

1899 – After retaining the provincial title, Tipperary subsequently advanced to the All-Ireland final where Wexford provided the opposition. Wexford held Tipp for the first fifteen minutes; however, the Munster men still took a 2–6 to 1–3 lead at half-time. Tipp went on the rampage in the second half and finished with a score of 3–12 to 1–4. The Wexford team walked off the field with ten minutes left in the game because they couldn't find a substitute for an injured player. Tipp were awarded the title.

1900 – Tipperary trounced Kerry, Kilkenny and Galway to book a place in the All-Ireland final. A new innovation was introduced this year as London were permitted to take on the winners of the so-called 'home' final to decide the resting place of the All-Ireland title. This game was a close affair with both sides level at 0–5 with eight minutes to go. London then took the lead; however, they later conceded a free. Captain Mikey Maher stepped up, took the free and a forward 'charge' carried the sliotar over the line. Tipp scored another goal following a weak puck out and claimed the victory. It was Maher's fifth and final All-Ireland title by 2–6 to 0–6. It was a remarkable fifth All-Ireland title in six years.

=== Two in three years (1906–1908) ===
1906 – In 1906 Tipperary played Dublin in the All-Ireland final for the first time in a decade. The game is notable for the quickest goal ever scored in a championship decider. Dublin's Bill Leonard snatched a goal after just five seconds. This good start did not deter Tipperary, who won the game by 3–16 to 3–8. Ironically, eleven of the Dublin team hailed from Tipperary

1908 – Tipperary won back their Munster championship. The All-Ireland final against Dublin was an exciting affair. Tipp were leading by 2–5 to 0–8 coming into the last passage of play when Harry Boland and Bill Leonard combined to score the equaliser. The replay took place in Athy, however, Tipperary were much too strong on the second meeting. Hugh Shelly and Tony Carew scored three goals between them to set Tipp on the way to a 3–15 to 1–5 victory.

=== Wilderness (1909–1915) ===
In this period, Tipp only won two Munster senior titles, while teams like Clare took centre stage. Cork were still going strong.

1909 – Tipp retain their Munster title and went on to the All Ireland final. Kilkenny provided the opposition, but Tipp went into the game with the distinction of never losing an All-Ireland final. An exciting game developed; however, it was Kilkenny's ability to get goals that proved the deciding factor. The final score of 4–6 to 0–12 gave Kilkenny a fourth All-Ireland title and subjected Tipp to a first championship decider defeat.

1913 – Tipp won their first Munster title since 1909. Tipp went on to the final, Kilkenny were once again the opponents. In the first fifteen-a-side final Kilkenny took a 1–4 to 1–1 lead at half-time. Tipp only managed a single point in the second-half. The final score was 2–4 to 1–2.

=== Tipp still winning (1916–1925) ===
Tipp went back to their winning ways in this period. Although only 2 All-Irelands would be won, they contested many Munster finals, winning 5.

1916 – Tipperary broke back after nearly a decade in the All-Ireland wilderness. Fierce rivals Kilkenny were the opponents in what proved to be a swansong for some of the players from their great team of the previous decade. Both teams were reduced to fourteen players as Tipp trailed by five points, however, they came storming back to win by 5–4 to 3–2.

1917 – Tipp retained the Munster title. They then went forward the final and met Dublin. Tipp were taught a lesson and lost their title on a score of 5–4 to 4–2.

1922 – Tipperary and Kilkenny broke back into the championship decider. Tipperary looked set for their tenth All-Ireland victory when they took a three-point lead with as many minutes left. 'The Cats' fought back with two match-winning goals by Paddy Donoghue and Dick Tobin to secure a 4–2 to 2–6 victory. Kilkenny would not beat Tipperary in the championship again until 1967.

1924 – Tipp won back the Munster title. They lost the semi-final to Galway. This loss was historic, as it was Tipp's first loss in an All Ireland semi-final and also their first championship loss to Galway.

1925 – Tipp would retain their Munster title. This time in the final, Tipp had the chance to get revenge over last years loss to Galway. Tipp scored the opening goal and then scored a second one straight after and won 5–6 to 1–5. It was Tipperary's tenth All-Ireland title.

=== Back to wilderness (1926 to 1936) ===
Tipp would only win 1 Munster and All Ireland title in this ten-year period, this was caused by Cork's dominance during the 1920s and Limerick's dominance during the 1930s.

1930 – Tipperary emerged from the province after a five-year wait and lined out against Dublin in the All-Ireland final. The goals by Martin Kennedy and J.J. Callanan gave Tipp the edge at half time. Tipp then stormed ahead in the second period of play and won by 2–7 to 1–3. Tipp completed a clean sweep of hurling titles that year, winning the Senior, Minor and Junior All-Ireland titles. The victory also put Tipp on top of the all-time roll of honour once again.

=== Second fiddle (1937–1948) ===
Over this period, Limerick's lost their dominance once more to Cork. Cork would get 4 All-Irelands in a row. Tipp won 2 All-Irelands and 3 Munsters, including the very strange year of 1941.

1937 – Tipperary got to their first outing in the championship decider since 1930. Kilkenny were the opponents. The game itself was played at FitzGerald Stadium in Killarney, due to the fact that the new Cusack Stand would not be finished in time at Croke Park. Tipperary surprised even themselves with a remarkable display. Kilkenny could only muster three points as Tipp scored 3–11 in a humiliating trouncing.

1941 – During 1941, Tipp and Kilkenny were struck by foot and mouth, taking them out of the championship. Cork would go on to meet Limerick in a makeshift Munster final until the end of the year. Tipp then recovered and met Cork in the true 1941 Munster final. This was strangely played after the All Ireland final, which Cork won. Tipp beat Cork. Cork became the first team to lose the provincial final, yet become All Ireland champions.

1945 – Tipperary emerged from the wilderness to book their place in the 1945 championship decider. Kilkenny provided the opposition in the final. Tipp raced into a stunning lead and left Kilkenny trailing by 4–3 to 0–3 at half-time. Three goals by 'the Cats' turned the tide, however, it wasn't enough as Tipperary won by 5–6 to 3–6.

=== Tipp's 3 in a row and the Tipp-Cork rivalry (1949–1954) ===
Tipp would go on to win their second three in a row and put new life into the Cork–Tipp rivalry. This team met Cork five times in Munster finals from 1949 to 1954. After years of doldrums and disappointments, this team helped to re-establish Tipp as a hurling superpower.

1949 – Tipperary's fortunes changed in 1949 when 'the premier county' broke Cork's stranglehold on the championship. The first game was a first-round game against Cork in Limerick. Tipp were ahead 3–10 to 2–9 with most of the game gone, but Jack Lynch and Bernie Murphy gave a display to tie it up. The replay was a classic game. Cork led by 1–2 to 0–2 at the break and were the much better side. They would've been more ahead if Mossie O Riordans goal, which appeared to come back off the sanction and cleared. the ref played on. Cork still led 1–5 to 0–5 with few minutes remaining. With seconds to go, Jimmy Kennedy brought the leaving Tipp fans back and brought it to extra time. This match is famous for Tipps creamery churn full of water in the dressing room which gave them vital energy to continue on and win it 2–8 to 1–9. In the semi-final, Tipp beat Clare 1–15 to 1–7. Clare led until 15 minutes to go, when Tipp staged a fight back to win. In the Munster final, Limerick provided Tipps opposition. Tipp won 1–16 to 2–10, in a game where Limerick's Jackie Power was controversially sent off. The 67,000 in Croke Park were treated to a novelty of Tipp v Laois. Laois stayed in touch 1–5 to 0–3 at half time, but Tipp fired away and finished 3–11 to 0–3.

1950 – In the semi-final against Limerick, Tipp only scraped past by three points to set up a meeting with Cork in the Munster final. The Munster final was dubbed the 'Anarachy in Killarney' All the chaos didn't affect Tipp and they led 1–13 to 1–6. With one quarter left, Tipp led 2–17 to 2–9, but there was an en masse invasion by the Cork fans. Tipp were rattled and Cork staged a fight back. With the lead now down to three points, every Cork score before that was greeted with an invasion and mainly targeted Tony Reddan. Tipp held on grimly on a 2–17 to 3–11. Thanks to a hattrick of goals from Sean Kenny, Tipp beat Galway by seven points in the All Ireland semi-final and a Tipp – Kilkenny final was the outcome. The game was tough, but Kilkenny looked to cause an upset, leading 0–7 to 0–5 at half time. Tipps adventures in Munster had giving them the experience to dig deep and Kilkenny froze, Tipp led 0–9 to 0–8 in the final stages. Two goals were exchanged and Tipp led 1–9 to 1–8 to lead to a nervous last few minutes, but they held on to win. This was Tipp's first two in a row since 1898–1899. The previous winners also went on to three in a row.

1951 – The opening Munster game was against Waterford, who put up a strong challenge before losing by a goal, 2–10 to 1–10. The semi final against Limerick was a more decisive contest, with Tipp progressing to meet Cork in the Munster final. It was a particularly hot day in Limerick and the final developed into a closely contested match. Tipp led 0–9 to 1–4 at half time. An Ring goal plus points gave Cork a three-point lead with one quarter to go. Tipp's Ned Ryan scored a goal and points were exchanged as the game progressed. Tipp appeared to be in a position to win, but Ring scored two points. Sonny Maher then scored the points that secured Tipps third consecutive Munsters title. The All Ireland final, which was seen by an estimated 70,000 spectators, saw Tipp wearing Blue as Munster champions and their opponents Wexford wearing green as Leinster champions. Wexford took an early 5-point lead, but at half-time, Tipp had recovered to take a one-goal lead. The second half saw Tipp extend their lead and eventually secure victory. Tipp won 7–7 to 3–9. It was Tommy Doyle's last final, and Nicky Rackard's first.

1952 – Tipp went on to face Cork in the Munster final once again and scored an early goal. Cork fought back to trail 2–5 to 0–5 at half time. With a quarter to go, Tipp still led by 4 points, but an O Riordan goal, which was argued to be fouled before he took it, left a point in it. Many thought it was justice served for the disallowed goal in 1949. Cork scored 4 points on the trot to win it, but a turning point at the end nearly happened for Tipp as Gerry Doyle's shot flew just inches over the crossbar. Tipp lost 1–11 to 2–7. The four in a row was not achieved.

1953 – Tipp were once more in a Munster final to try to halt Cork in Limerick. Tipp had a wind behind them, but only led 1–8 to 1–4 at half time. Tipp led by 5 points, but a goal from Liam Dowling set up for a frantic finish. Near the end, a good play from Cork saw them get the winning goal.

1954 – The Munster final was once more Tipp and Cork, and Tipp had a chance to stop Corks own three in a row in Limerick. Tipp led by 6 points at half time, but once more didn't take advantage of the wind at their backs. Midway through the second half, Seamus Bannon took on the Cork backs and soloed the ball and buried it in the back of the net. It was dis-allowed. A Cork back threw a hurley at Seamus which provoked the referee to pull play back. The advantage rule which benefited Liam Dowling two years before didn't seem to apply to Seamus Bannon. Tipp lost the final and would have to wait till 1958 to get their hands on silverware once more.

=== Tipp's greatest era (1958–1968) ===
Tipp would give a roaring comeback into hurling with their greatest ever team. From 1958 till 1968, Tipp reached 8 finals, winning 5.

1958 – Tipperary's first championship match in the 1958 Munster championship was against Limerick at Cork. Only seven of the previous year's championship team, Mickey Byrne, John Doyle, Jimmy Finn, Tony Wall, John Hough, Musha Maher and Jimmy Doyle were selected. Limerick were favourites as a result of an impressive display against Wexford in the league final, but Tipperary confounded the pundits and beat them by double scores. Changes were made for the semi-final against Cork. Over forty-five thousand people saw Tipperary wipe away memories of seven lean years, when they defeated Cork by 2–6 to 2–4. The Munster final was played at Thurles and forty-two thousand spectators saw one of the poorest Munster finals for years. Waterford had qualified by virtue of beating Kerry in the semi-final and Tipperary were much too good for them, beating them by sixteen points. The All-Ireland semi-final against Kilkenny at Croke Park will be remembered as the game of the 'two Doyles'. The 'dynamic' John and the 'deadly' Jimmy made a major contribution to Tipperary's 1–13 to 1–8 victory. Only forth-seven thousand spectators, the lowest figure since 1944, attended the All-Ireland between Tipperary and Galway. Tipperary won by 4–9 to 2–5 in a very disappointing final.

1959 – 1959 was to be a disastrous year for Tipperary. Their first match in the Munster Championship was against Limerick whom they beat by 2–9 to 1–7 but not very impressive. Even though missing Jimmy Finn, they were expected to beat Waterford but that was not so, Waterford had other ideas. At half time, it was 8–2 to Tipp's no score. Waterford went on to beat Tipp by 9–4 to 3–4.

In 1960, Tipperary defeated Limerick by 10–9 to 2–1 in the opening round of the Munster Championship. They then overcame Waterford 6–9 to 2–7 in the semi-final before defeating Cork 3–4 to 2–4 in the Munster final at Thurles on 31 July. The victory marked Tipperary’s first Munster final win over Cork since 1951. In the All-Ireland final, however, Wexford proved the stronger side and defeated Tipperary by 2–15 to 0–11

1961 – Tipperary played Galway – who had their only success in the Munster championship that year when they beat Clare in the first round – in the semi-final at Ennis. Tipperary were ahead by 6–9 to 1–4 thirteen minutes into the second half. Galway, however, refused to lie down and in a great burst of effort scored four goals in the space of seven minutes. Tipperary rallied a bit in the final minutes to win by 7–12 to 5–6. The Munster final at Limerick attracted an official attendance of 62,175, the biggest crowd ever to witness a sporting event in Ireland outside Croke Park. With Jimmy Doyle and Donie Nealon in brilliant form, Tipperary built up a match-winning lead of 3–3 to 0–1 at halftime. Although Cork improved in the second half, their attack relied too much on Christy Ring, who was approaching his forty-first birthday. With Liam Devaney and Theo English also in outstanding form, and Donie O'Brien unbeatable between the posts, Cork were thwarted time and again to leave Tipperary clear winners by 3–6 to 0–7. It was Ring's last appearance in a Munster final. Tipperary were expected to beat Dublin in the All-Ireland final at Croke Park on 3 September. In fact, because of Dublin's record in senior hurling since 1938, many expected the victory to be easy. The result was much different. Tipperary won the game by 0–16 to 1–12, and it took all their determination to hold out against a very fine Dublin side, that was much superior in speed. Dublin lost because they could do everything but get the scores they should have got. It was Dublin's last time to get out of Leinster. It was the first hurling match to be televised by RTÉ.

1962 – Tipperary played Limerick at Cork in the 1962 Munster semi-final, and led at the interval by 2–7 to 0–4. Four minutes from time referee, Jimmy Smyth, prematurely blew the final whistle, with Tipperary leading by 3–12 to 4–8. After some hurries consultations the game was restarted. P. J. Keane equalised for Limerick. Just before the final whistle Tipperary forced a seventy, but Mick Burns's effort was just wide. In the replay at the same venue three weeks later, they swept Limerick aside by 5–13 to 2–4. Waterford were Tipperary's opponents in the Munster final at Limerick. Waterford were a complete disappointment. Although they enjoyed territorial advantage in the first half, they failed to make use of it. Tipperary led by 2–3 to 1–3 at the interval, and went on to win by 5–14 to 2–3. The All-Ireland final against Wexford was a thrilling encounter. Tipperary got off to a lightning start with two goals, by Tom Moloughney and Seán McLoughlin. After twenty-five minutes the sides were level, but Tipperary got three points to lead by 2–6 to 1–6 at the interval. It was a ding-dong struggle in the second half, with the lead changing from side to side. In the end Tipperary had two points to spare on a scoreline of 3–10 to 2–11. Liam Connolly and Tom Ryan of Toomevara replaced Matt O'Gara and captain, Jimmy Doyle, early in the second half. In the end it was the splendid fitness of Tipperary that saw them through a grinding test, which enthralled the crowd of over 75,000 spectators.

1963 – In the 1963 Championship, Tipp beat Cork in the first round but in the final v Waterford they were beaten by 0–11 to 0–8.

1964 – As National League 'home' winners Tipperary had a trip to New York to play the home side at the end of May 1964. On returning they had a month to prepare for their Munster semi-final game against Clare at Limerick on 5 July. Tipperary had an easy victory by 6–13 to 2–5. Tipperary led by 1–6 to 0–4 at halftime. About ten minutes from the end there was an incident involving about twelve players from both sides, but nobody was sent off. The Munster final was a total anti-climax. Over 44,000 people were expecting a thriller, but all they got was a dull game in which Cork never came up to expectations. Tipperary had a fourteen-point margin of victory. But for Paddy Barry in the Cork goal the victory might have been of bigger proportions. Despite this good form Tipperary were underdogs in the All-Ireland Final against defending champions Kilkenny. As it turned out, Tipperary inflicted a 14-point defeat on Kilkenny, 5–13 to 2–8, and in doing so took their twentieth title. Although they conceded some soft goals, they were beaten by a great Tipperary team that gave an exhibition of power-packed hurling to which they had no answer. Even though the contest was one-sided, the game was memorable for some splendid hurling.

1967 – In 1967, Kilkenny would take on this Tipperary team that was heading over the hill. A victory for 'the Cats' by 3–8 to 2–7 put an end to a 45-year Tipperary bogey for the Kilkenny hurlers. Kilkenny would also stop John Doyle from winning an historic ninth All Ireland medal, as this was his last final.

1968 – In 1968 Tipperary contested their seventh All-Ireland final of the decade, having won four and lost two. Furthermore, it was their second consecutive final having lost to Kilkenny the previous year. Wexford provided the opposition for the fourth time that decade and a classic game of hurling ensued. Tipp led by eight points at half-time, however, Wexford fought back to set up a grandstand finish. At the long whistle Wexford triumphed by 5–8 to 3–12, thus bringing the curtain down on the greatest Tipperary team of all time.

=== Famine (1971–1986) ===
1971 – Tipp won the Munster final in 1971, after a three-year wait with a 4–16 to 3–18 win against Limerick in Killarney after previously defeating Clare in the semi-final by 1–15 to 3–4 in Limerick. In the All Ireland semi-final, Galway were defeated by 3–26 to 6–8 in Birr. They would go on to meet Kilkenny in the final. It was the first all Ireland hurling final to be broadcast in colour TV, and made famous when Tipperarys Michael Babs Keating removed his boots to play and beat kilkenny in his bare feet! Eddie Keher scored 2–11, but finished on the losing side as Tipp won 5–17 to 5–14 with Tadhg o Connor of Rosgrea lifting the Liam McCarthy cup for Tipperary.

1973 – Tipp would go on to lose the Munster final to Limerick in extraordinary fashion. Losing in injury time to a Richie Bennis '65, which most would claim wasn't a point at all, the final score was 6–7 to 2–18 in Limericks favour.

1984 – Tipperary's famine nearly came to an end in the Munster final against Cork in the centenary year of the GAA. They shocked Cork and led by 4 points with 4 minutes remaining. But a late rally by Cork inspired by Seánie O'Leary and Tony O'Sullivan broke Tipp hearts and Cork won by 4 points.

=== 'The Famine is over' (1987–1993) ===
1987 – Tipperary went into the Munster final, once again against Cork. Tipperary won their first Munster title since 1971 and Richie Stakelum stood up while receiving the cup and shouted 'The Famine is over', then singing Slievenamon. Tipperary then lost to Galway in the semi-final.

1988 –Tipperary regained their Munster crown, and went into their first All Ireland final since 1971. Galway defeated them in the final 1–15 to 0–14.

1989 – The Munster final against Waterford was a badly played affair, with players being sent off. Tipperary beat Galway in the semi-final and met Antrim in the final. Tipperary won 4–24 to 3–9 with star player Nicky English scoring 2–12 in the final.

1990 – Tipperary lost their Munster crown to Cork in 1990. This was owed much to the comments of Babs Keating 'You can't win derbies with donkeys'

1991 – Tipperary won back the title from Cork The first game would come to a thrilling draw, with the replay being even more brilliant. The 1991 final would be Tipp VS Kilkenny, 20 years on from their last all Ireland final meeting in 1971. The final was nip and tuck with some great displays from Pat Fox and Christy Heffernan. kilkennys John Power ended up injured on a barbed wire fence surrounding the pitch after a challenge from Tipperarys Bobby Ryan during the game, Michael Cleary took a free, which fell short and ended up in the back of the kilkenny net giving Tipp a lead that they would maintain thanks to some excellent goalkeeping from Ken Hogan, as Tipp went on to win by 4 points, it ended Tipperary 1–16 to kilkennys 0–15 points.on the Hogan stand Declan Carr was presented with the last outing of the original Liam McCarthy cup.

1993 – After their disaster of 1992, Tipp would redeem themselves in the Munster final of 1993, thrashing Clare. They would lose the semi-final to Galway, ending this great Tipp team.

=== Wilderness (1994 to 1999) ===
In this period, Tipp would get to the All Ireland final of 1997 and Munster finals of 1996, 1997 and 2000. Losing them Limerick, Clare and Cork respectively.

1996 – With Len Gaynor in his second year, he had to get Tipp back on top. The year started out with a trip to Walsh Park against 'The Deise'. Tipp won 1–14 to 1–11. The semi-final was against a Kerry side, who three years previously beat Waterford. Tipp beat Kerry in Austin Stack Park, Tralee 4–19 to 2–11. The final in Limerick would be a tense affair. it was tit for tat and eventually the game went to a draw. The replay was less extravagant and Limerick won 4–07 to 0–16.

1997 – Tipp would start out against Limerick and would redeem themselves for last year, beating them 1–20 to 0–13. The Munster final would only become exciting with the last few minutes, but Clare would beat Tipp 1–18 to 0–18. Tipp would become the first team to get to the All Ireland final through the back door system, beating Down and Wexford on the way. They would be beaten by Clare once again. John Leahy nearly winning the All Ireland in the last minute, but missing the goal chance. the final score in the historic 'All Munster final' was 0–20 to 2–13 to Clare.

=== Tipp in the 21st century (2000–2007) ===
2000 – Nicky English's second year as manager would be more successful than the first. Tipp started out after a poor year in 1999 with a quarter-final against Waterford in Cork. Waterford had previously beaten them in 1998. Tipp exacted revenge, beating them, 0–14 to 0–10 in a poor match. The Semi final was a less competitive affair, Tipp beating Clare, who beat them the year previously. Tipp walking through 2–19 to 1–14 in Cork.

The final was the renewed rivalry of Cork and Tipp, who played their last Munster final against each other in the great draw and replay in 1991. This match was closely contested and fought till the end. The All-Ireland champions however had more experience in these situations than Tipp and won 0–23 to 3–12 in the closest Munster final in years.

Tipp entered the All-Ireland quarter-finals for the second time, this time against Galway. It was their first meeting in the Championship since 1993 and Galway had already beaten them in the League final earlier that year. Galway went on to beat Tipp 1–14 to 0–15, in what would be Eoin Kelly's first championship game for Tipp, albeit as a sub.

2001 – 2001 started off with an unbeaten run which had run up until May, including a League win. The first match was a semi-final against Clare. The Clare team of the 1990s was now on its way down and looking for a last hurrah, but were beaten by Tipp by a solitary point 0–15 to 0–14.

The Munster final against Limerick in Cork was played under a massive heatwave. This match was very close, with both teams taking grasp of it at different times. Tipp held on and won their first Munster Senior title since 1993. The score was 2–16 to 1–17.

Tipp seemed to be doing things the hard way, and the All Ireland semi-final would prove no different. Wexford were the opponents. The semi-final was the finest in years and ended a draw, 3–10 to 1–16. The semi-final was an anticlimax, with Tipp taking the spoils 3–12 to 0–10.

The final between Tipp and Galway was the first between the counties since 1988, when Galway won their only two in a row. The final was another close contest. Mark O'Leary scored two vital goals to win it for Tipp 2–18 to 2–15. This was Tipp's first All Ireland since 1991. Tipp received the Liam MacCarthy Cup on the field, as the Hogan stand was being re-built.

2002 – Tipp started out the year badly, losing their first two league games, but winning four in a row to get to a semi-final showdown with Cork. Tipp were beaten. Tipp had lost their league crown and now had to defend their Munster title too. Tipp played Clare in the Munster Quarter final in Cork and went on to win by two points, 1–18 to 2–13. Tipp faced Limerick and beat them 1–20 to 1–13 to get into their third Munster final in a row. They faced a Waterford side who had beaten Cork, though were still expected to win. Waterford started well and led most of the game. Tipp had a late comeback, but it was too little to late as Waterford won their first Munster crown since 1963, against Tipp. The score was 2–23 to 3–12. Tipp now entered into the qualifiers for the very first time and beat Offaly easily by 2–19 to 1–09. They faced Antrim in the All-Ireland quarter-final and beat them 1–25 to 2–12. Tipp now faced Kilkenny and being defending champions, and their record in All-Ireland semi-finals being almost perfect, were expected to edge it. Kilkenny won by four points 1–20 to 1–14 in Croke Park. Once again, Tipp failed to retain Liam McCarthy.

2003 – With Nicky English now gone, John Doyle's son Michael Doyle took to the helm. 2003 would start off with 7 league wins out of 8 to get to the final against Kilkenny in Croke Park. This would prove to be a great final and it was decided only at the end with Kilkenny winning by one point, 5–14 to 5–13. This set Tipp for their Munster quarter-final game against Clare. Tipp were beaten 2–17 to 0–14. Tipp's second stint in the qualifiers would begin. Tipp went to Portlaoise to take on Laois for the first time since the 1949 All-Ireland final. Tipp won it easily 3–28 to 0–13. Tipp now made their journey to Galway city to take on the Tribesmen and won 1–18 to 1–17. Tipp faced Offaly in the quarter-final winning by 2–16 to 2–11. Kilkenny stood in Tipp's way in the semi-final, but the roles were reversed. Kilkenny were now defending champions and Tipp the challengers. Despite leading by 2 points at the break Tipp collapsed in the 2nd half, eventually losing by 3–18 to 0–15. This would be Tipp's last All-Ireland semi-final for five years.

2004 – Tipp were now managed by Ken Hogan, keeper of the last dominant era of 1987–1993. But he wouldn't have the luck of his counterpart Nicky English. Tipp would get to the second group phase of the league, but didn't continue. Their Munster championship got off to a bad start against Waterford in Cork. Waterford once again getting vital goals to ensure a 4–10 to 3–12 victory. Tipp entered the qualifiers again, this time against Munster rivals Limerick. One point separated them at full-time, 3–10 to 2–12. Tipp now had history staring at them in the face in the next round. They faced Cork in none other than Fitzgerald stadium, Killarney. The site of the famous battles of '87 and '91. Tipp had a weight on their shoulders in this match as they had never been beaten by Cork in Killarney up to this point. Cork shot out of the blocks and cruised to a 2–19 to 0–16 victory.

2005 – 2005 was a better year in terms of achievements and longevity for Tipp, once again getting to the second group phase of the league, but no further. They started their campaign in Munster against Limerick and it took two games to decide a winner. 2–14 to 2–14 was the first game, while 2–13 to 0–18 decided the game in Tipp's favour. Tipp's semi-final opponents were Clare and Tipp got revenge for the defeat in 2003 with a two-goal win, 2–14 to 0–14. Tipp were now back in a Munster final for the first time since 2002, and the old rivals, Cork, were waiting. Tipp and Cork were neck and neck till the last 15 minutes when Cork pulled away to a 1–21 to 1–16 win. Tipp now were in the quarter-finals against Galway in Croke park. Tipp were beaten narrowly by 2 points.

2006 – 2006 would see the return of manager Babs Keating to the helm, with the idea of getting Tipp back to the top as his main priority. Tipp got to a league semi-final, until beaten by Kilkenny. Tipp entered the Munster championship in the quarter-finals against Limerick and would beat them 0–22 to 2–12. Tipp faced Waterford for the first time since 2004 and revenge was on the cards. Tipp had a good game, winning well 3–14 to 1–12. Tipp were back in the Munster final again and once more against Cork. The game was in Thurles and the perfect Munster final got underway. Tipp gave everything and pushed Cork to the limit. They would only fail by 3 points, 2–14 to 1–14. Tipp were now in a Quarter final again and facing Waterford for a second time in one championship. Tipp were expected to win again, but Waterford didn't read the script, as they won 1–22 to 3–13.

2007 – Babs' first year was good, but maintaining form for a second year was going to be tough. Tipp lost to Waterford in the National League quarter-final and entered the Munster championship in the semi-final, against Limerick. The winner was only decided after 3 games and extra time. The first game was drawn level by a late Pat Tobin goal for Limerick. Tipp would jump out of the blocks in the second game and record a 10-point lead at half time. Limerick ate away and soon enough drew it up for extra time. Both teams drew again at 1–24 to 2–21 and a trilogy was set. In this game, Limerick had the upper hand for most of the game and the game ended level. Extra time was entered once more and Tipp started off with a Willie Ryan goal. Limerick still fought and were leading by a point when Lar Corbett seemed to be fouled around the 45-metre line. The free was not given and Limerick got a point to make it a two-point lead. Limerick would go on to win it 0–22 to 2–13. Tipp entered the qualifier group stage in a group with Dublin, Offaly and Cork. They would beat Offaly 2–17 to 2–13. They would beat Dublin in Parnell Park 1–20 to 1–11 in a hard-fought victory. The next game was Cork in Semple Stadium. The winner would go on to a quarter-final against Wexford and the loser would meet Munster Champions Waterford. This was Tipp's incentive and the game commenced. The game was tough and even till the end when Tipp led by 1 point when Cork got a sideline ball in scoring range. If Ben O'Connor got this, Cork would win the group on score difference, if not, Tipp would top the group. Ben missed and Tipp faced Wexford. Tipp were red hot favourites and started out just the same. Wexford would keep in touch, but a mistake by Gerry Kennedy would give Wexford a goal. This year would be famous for Babs' controversial dropping of Brendan Cummins and Eoin Kelly off the panel. Tipp would be ahead by 2 points with 10 minutes to go when Wexford got a penalty. Damien Fitzhenry, the Wexford goalie stepped up to take it and ripped it into the back of the net to lead by a point. Wexford won the puck out and got a second to win by two points, 3–10 to 1–14. Babs would be sacked.

=== Tipp back to winning ways (2008–2010) ===
2008 –'Senior' 2008 was Liam Sheedy's first year as manager and Tipperary started the year by retaining their Waterford Crystal Cup and then going on to win the National hurling League against Galway on 20 April by 3–18 to 3–16. They then entered the Munster Championship against old rivals Cork. Tipp beat Cork in Páirc Uí Chaoimh by 1–19 to 1–13 and won the county's first championship match in Cork since 1923. Tipp then went on to face Clare in the final at the Gaelic Grounds in Limerick, Clare had knocked out former champions Waterford and 2007 All Ireland finalists Limerick to get to the final on 13 July. Tipp claimed their first Munster Senior Hurling title since 2001 and 37th title overall as won by a score of 2–21 to 0–19. Goals in either half from Séamus Callinan (1–3) and John O'Brien (1–4) helped the National League champions to an eight-point win.

Tipp were now in their first All Ireland Semi final since 2003 and were favourites against Waterford on 17 August. They lost by 1–18 to 1–20 to Waterford who themselves qualified for their first final since 1963. The senior team were unbeaten in all competitions before the Waterford Semi final game.

'Minor' The Tipperary Minor hurling team were beaten in the Munster Minor final against Cork, and lost the Minor All Ireland semi-final to Killkenny in August.

'Intermediate' The Intermediate hurling team lost to Limerick in the Munster final.

'Under-21' In the under 21 Munster Championship, Tipp defeated Clare in a Controversial Munster final in Ennis in July. Tipp then lost the All-Ireland final against Kilkenny.

2009 –

'Senior' Tipperary reached the final of the Allianz NHL Division One on 3 May against Kilkenny at Semple Stadium, Thurles. Tipperary led for the majority of the game but faded in extra-time after the two teams finished locked on 2–17 to 3–14 after 70 minutes. The final score after extra time was Kilkenny 2–26 Tipperary 4–17. James Woodlock, John O'Brien, Séamus Callinan and Noel McGrath scored the Tipperary goals. On 31 May, Tipperary beat Cork in Munster Senior Hurling Championship quarter-final by 1–19 to 0–19. A goal in the first minute of the second half from Seamus Callinan put Tippeary into a commanding lead, Cork fought back to within a point, but in the end Tippeary pulled away again to win by 3 points. Tipperary went on to play Clare in the Munster Hurling Championship Semi final in the Gaelic Grounds, Limerick on 21 June. They started the game well with goals from Lar Corbett and Seamus Callinan to lead by 1–6 to 0–1 after ten minutes. They were leading by 11 points with five minutes to go before half time, then Clare scored a goal and a point, it was later shown on replays that the ball did not go over the line for the Clare goal. Tipp then got on top in the second half and got third goal from John O'Brien, Clare again narrowed the lead to three points, before saves from Brendan Cummins and good defensive work from the full back line ensured Tipperary got over the line by two points, 3–18 to 1–22. On 12 July 2009, Tipperary defeated Waterford by 4–14 to 2–16 in the Munster Final at Semple Stadium. Waterford scored 1–2 to 0–1 in the opening few minutes, but Tipp battled back with goals from Seamus Callinan, Eoin Kelly and Lar Corbett gave Tipp a 3–10 to 2–4 advantage at half time. Tipp started the second half by scoring a fourth goal through Lar Corbett to give Tipperary an 11-point lead. Tipperary had a lead of 8 points until the 63rd minute, then Waterford fought back, but Tipperary held out to win by four points and claim their second Munster hurling title in a row. On 16 August, Tipperary faced Limerick in Croke Park in the All- Ireland semi-final for the first time. Eoin Kelly scored a goal after 5 minutes had gone and then Tipperary scored again with a point from John O'Brien. With 16 minutes gone, Tipp scored a second goal, this time a pass from Lar Corbett to Noel McGrath who tapped the ball over the line. Exactly one minute later, Tipp scored a third goal, Pat Kerwick scoring with a shot into the corner of the net. Tipp continued to score and led by 3–8 to 0–4 at half time. Early in the second half Limerick got a penalty which goalkeeper Brian Murray scored from. Limerick then scored a second goal, but were still 12 points behind at that stage. Tipp then scored another goal, Lar Corbett finishing after a pass from Noel McGrath. With 10 minutes to go, another Lar Corbett goal made it 2 for him, and 5 overall for the team. Corbett then got a hat-trick when a move full of stick work and handpassing from Seamus Callinan, Noel McGrath, Micheal Webster ending with Cobett finishing into an empty net. The final score was Tipperary 6–19 Limerick 2–7. Tipp now go onto the final against Kilkenny on 6 September. On 6 September 2009, Tipperary played Kilkenny in the All-Ireland final. Both teams started well, exchanging point for point with no team taking a grasp of the game. Most of the opening scores were frees, Eoin Kelly and Henry Shefflin being the takers. The game was full of hard tackles and hits. Tipperary were leading by two points with ten minutes remaining in the first half, but Kilkenny pulled ahead by two and the half time whistle blew. More points were exchanged as the game continued, Lar Corbett and Eoin Kelly scoring most of the Tipperary points. Midway through the second half, Benny Dunne was brought on for John O'Brien. A few minutes after he came on, he pulled wildly on Tommy Walsh and received a straight red card. Tipperary then went three points ahead. Kilkenny got one back and then Kilkenny were awarded a dubious penalty by referee Barry Kelly. Henry Shefflin scored a resulting goal and Kilkenny's substitute Martin Comerford scored a second goal. Tipperary kept fighting back, but it was too late despite being widely regarded as the better team on the day. The final score was 2–22 to 0–23 in kilkennys favour.

'Intermediate' On the same day the Intermediate hurling team lost to Cork by 1–24 to 2–6 in the Munster Intermediate Hurling Championship. Timmy Dalton, current Tipp under-21 hurler scoring 1–1 in which Tipp did not look like winning for most of the game. Tipp are now knocked out of the running for both Munster and All Ireland and will not take part in any more matches in 2009

'Under 21' On 3 June in the Munster Under-21 Hurling Championship, Tipperary beat Cork in the quarter-final 2–22 to 0–25 after extra time. Pa Bourke had a chance to win it for Tipperary in the last minute of normal time but missed the free, and Cork also missed the winning shot from 21 yards out to bring it to extra time. It was as close in extra time, but Tipp seemed the stronger and a save from Bill McCormack plus points from Bourke and Callinan made sure of the win. On 15 July, in Fraher Field, Dungarvan, Tipp lost to Waterford by 3–20 to 2–14. Tipp got off to a good early start, leading 1–1 to 0–1 after a Pa Bourke goal. But Waterford came back to lead by a point at half time. Waterford then got a three-point lead, which went to two and back many times, before they put home their fourth and fifth points. Maurice Shanahan scoring 0–10 from frees and another goal for Waterford with 10 minutes to go sealed it and knocked Tipp out of the 2009 Munster Under 21 Hurling Semi final. The Under 21s, who had 10 of the present senior panel and had real potential were then out of the running for both Munster and All Ireland and took no further part in the 2009 championship.

'Minor' Tipp started out with a Munster Minor Hurling Championship Quarter final against Limerick in the Gaelic Grounds, Limerick which was a close affair in the first with both teams not showing their true colours. Tipp then came out firing on all cylinders in the second half to pull ahead. Tipp won a comfortable 1–21 to 0–11 with Tipp, as seen to identified with both Under 21 and Senior in Munster, finishing the stronger.

On 24 June, The Munster Minor Hurling Championship semi-final against Cork was an absolute thriller in Páirc Uí Chaoimh, Cork. Tipp led by two points until Cork's Jamie Coughlan put the Rebels up 1–07 to 1–06 at half time. Cork then turned on the gas and scored another goal, scored by Eoin O'Sullivan two minutes in and Tipp couldn't find their footing until midway through the half. Templederry Kenyons Brian Stapleton netting Tipp's second goal putting Tipp up four points. Cork then fought back with 1–1 without reply. Tipp were still leading till Cork sub Brian Hartnett scored the equaliser in the last minute to bring it to extra time. Extra time started out with Tipp taking full control with David Butler and David Collins to make Tipp leading 4–17 to 3–13 at half time. Cork came out like a team possessed and brought down the 8-point deficit to lead by two points. It looked game set and match with two minutes to go, but Tipp scoring a scrappy late goal to lead by a point. Cork then ran down field and had a goal chance, but Tipp gave away a 65', which was converted by Cork leaving both teams 5–17 a piece and a replay ensured.

The replay on 1 July was won by Tipp on a scoreline of 2–21 to 1–12. Tipp and Cork started out even with both teams getting scores. Early in the second half, Cork got a goal to bring the gap down to 4 points, but Tipp sub David Butler of the Kickhams answered back with a goal for Tipp. The second half proved to be Tipp's and they powered into an 11-point lead, Cork kept getting points, but Tipp answering back to win by 12 points.

On 12 July, Tipp lost to Waterford in the Munster Minor Hurling Final by 0–18 to 1–13. Waterford were the stronger side throughout and Tipp squandered 4 goal chances, until the final few minutes of the game when they finally got their goal which came too late.

On 25 July, Tipp beat Wexford 0–20 to 0–19 in the All-Ireland Minor Hurling Championship Quarter finals at O'Moore Park, Portlaoise. The game had a few goal chances from both teams, but none of them taken. Tipp and Wexford started out with both teams taking and losing leads with Wexford going 0–7 to 0–6 in at the interval. Clonmel Óg's Michael O'Brien was sent off after a second bookable offence. The second half was much the same, with Wexford leading for the majority, but Brian Stapleton bringing the game into extra time. It was nip and tuck for the first and second halves, with Wexford and Tipp getting goal chances. Eanna Murphy scored Tipp's winning point and ensured they went on to the next round to meet All Ireland Minor Hurling Champions Kilkenny in Croke Park. Tipp went to face The All Ireland Minor champions Kilkenny in the semi-final at Croke Park. Tipp started out poorly, going 0–10 to 0–2 behind early on. David Collins scored a goal and made it 1–2. Kilkenny led at half time 0–15 to 1–6. Tipp came out in the second half and proceeded to eat into Kilkenny's lead. John O'Dwyer scored Tipp's second goal and Tipp scored a point to level it up, but within a minute, Kilkenny's ruthlessness showed as they scored 1–1, thanks to a goal from Walter Walsh and a point from captain Canice Maher, to lead by 4 points again. Tipp fought back and brought Kilkenny's lead to a point once more. With 2 minutes to go in the game, Brian Stapleton had a chance from 21 yards out to level it up, but it went agonisingly wide. Kilkenny got a late free and put it over to win by two points: 1–21 to 2–16.

2010 –

'Senior' On 26 January, Tipperay started the new hurling year with a 1–12 to 0–17-point defeat to Clare in Borrisoleigh in the Waterford Crystal Cup quarter-final. The game was physical from the throw in and Clare dominated the majority of the game. Clare put over many brilliant scorers with Tipp managing to keep in touch at half time, 0–10 to 0–6. Liam Sheedy decided to make some changes, bringing on Lar Corbett, Micheal Webster and Noel McGrath. Tipp never got within a point of Clare during the game. Eoin Kelly also missed a penalty chance at goal. Tipp's Noel McGrath got the only goal and Tipp were back within 2 points. Clare's backs never looked like being beaten and Tipp got the last point of the game.

After Tipp's first-round game of the 2010 National Hurling League against Kilkenny called off twice due to bad weather, Tipps first game was against Dublin on 28 February in Parnell Park. Tipp started the game by scoring a penalty in the first minute. Dublin then got 6 points in a row to gain a lead they would not surrender. The first half was evenly fought with both teams hitting over points with Dublin keeping their lead The first sight of the new rules was evident as Dublin got a goal by knocking the ball out of Tipp goalie Darren Gleeson's hands, which would have been called as a 'square ball' if the new rules were not in place. The second half began with Dublin taking the game and pulling away. Tipp and Dublin both scorned goal chances and both tems hitting many wides. The game ended 1–21 to 1–12.

Tipp finally got their first-round game against Kilkenny underway on 7 March 2010. Tipp started off well, matching Kilkenny point for point. Eoin Kelly putting over all his frees. It was a low scoring first half, with both teams putting over 6 points each. With a minute to go in the first half, Eoin Kelly got the ball and turned to his right, putting the ball in the back of the Kilkenny net to make it 1–6 to 0–6. Kilkenny got two points straight after the resumption, but Tipp kept putting over the points. Tipp would never relinquished the lead. With ten minutes to go, A me-lee started by the players escalated into a confrontation between manager's Brian Cody and Liam Sheedy, but the referee Barry Kelly quickly handled the situation. Tipp would make it 1–13 to 0–13 near the finish and sub Jody Brennan put over the insurance point at the death to lay downamarker for the year ahead when Tipp won 1–14 to 0–13.

Tipp got their third league game underway against Galway in Semple Stadium on 14 March. Tipp started out by giving away two early points, but a lucky goal from the '65 from Eoin Kelly, doubled on by John O'Brien and a point put them ahead. Galway still had the edge over Tipp and got into a 0–8 to 1–1 lead. Tipp finished off the half stronger, bring their deficit to 4 points, 0–13 to 1–6. The second half would be much different for both teams. Tipp hit three consecutive points, before Noel McGrath scored their second goal, leading 2–9 to 0–13. Galway would then score their only point of the second half, but Eoin Kelly hitting two more points to see a 2–12 to 0–14 lead. Tipp got five more points to close off the game, beating Galway 2–17 to 0–14.

Tipp's 4th-round game was against Limerick in the Gaelic Grounds, Limerick. The game started off with Tipp and Limerick getting their opening points early on, but the contest ended there. Tipp went to score a goal after 25 minutes when Timmy Hammersley rasped in a shot. The half time score 1–10 to 0–2. The second half began with Limerick player Dean Madden being sent off and then substitute John O'Brien scored Tipps second goal, to make it 2–15 to 0–2. Tipp continued to hit points, but Limerick also hit six points in the second half. The score ended 2–24 to 0–8.

Tipp's 5th-round game was against Waterford in Semple Stadium on 28 March. The game was 0–2 to 0–0 at 7 minutes with Tipp getting the first point nearly 10 minutes into the first half. Timmy Hammersley scored to bring it to a point. Tipp led by three points 0–9 to 0–6, before Stephen Molumphy scored the goal for Waterford to level it up. The first half ended with Tipp leading by a point, 0–13 to 1–9. The second half started out at blistering, near championship pace. Noel McGrath missed a penalty to put Tipp ahead but Noel McGrath made up for it with another strike later on, this time it was a goal. Waterford kept answering back with a well-struck 20-metre free from Eoin Kelly, which landed in the net. Tipp led by a point in the closing stages, but Eoin Kelly from Waterford slotted over a free to level it up. The referee, who added one minute of injury time, didn't play the minute and blew it up. The final score was 1–19 to 2–16.

Tipp's 6th-round game was against Cork in Páirc Uí Chaoimh on 4 April. Cork started off the better, getting two opening points, but Eoin Kelly levelled it up with two frees. Cork then took a four-point lead, 0–6 to 0–2. Both exchanged points, but Cork finished the half the stronger with a 0–11 to 0–7 scoreline, their last point coming from a free that resulted from a controversial line ball. The second half began with Tipp the stronger. Cork keeper Martin Coleman saved a rasping shot from Lar Corbett with Eoin Kelly failing to put in the rebound. Shane McGrath and Eoin Kelly scoring two points to put it 0–11 to 0–9. Two quick points from Paul Kelly resulted in 0–11 tally each, before Gearoid Ryan putting over the leading score. Paul Kelly then took on a massive run, running past the Cork backs before hitting a low shot into Cork's net to make it 1–12 to 0–11. Cork quickly responded with a shot saved by Brendan Cummins, but a good piece of skill saw Pat Horgan sending in the rebound. Cork quickly equalised, but Tipp kept putting over points. Cork finally got the leading score and then led by two with a great run from Shane O'Neill resulting in a scored free. Tipp brought it back to a point game, but couldn't find the equaliser. Cork winning the game 1–16 to 1–15.

Tipp's 7th and last round game was against Offaly in O'Connor Park, Tullamore on 18 April. Tipp started off well, getting a 0–4 to 0–2 lead, but Tipp and Offaly traded points afterwards. The game was close and at half time, the score was 0–11 to 0–7. The second half started out with Offaly taking the initiative and putting over the points. Tipp stayed ahead, but Offay's Shane Dooley got a goal. Tipp were now two points behind, but soon conceded another Shane Dooley goal within 2 minutes of his first one. Tipp started putting over points to bring the deficit down to two points. With injury time almost up, Tipp got a free on the 20-metre line. Seamus Callanan stepped up to take it. Only a goal would win the match, seeing as when the ball would go over a boundary, the game would be over. He took th ball and struck it low into the net to give Tipp a one-point win and third place in the league table.

Tipp started out their Munster championship campaign against Cork in Páirc Uí Chaoimh on 30 May. The winner had the chance of playing Limerick in the semi-final, which for both teams would be a mis-match. In a competitive sense, a Munster Semi-final. Tipp started out getting a point in the opening few minute, but Cork soon replied. Tipp got two more points to make it a 0–3 to 0–1 lead, but Cork would soon lead. With just 13 minutes gone, Aisike O'hAilpin caught a ball above Padraig Maher and was brought down for a penalty. Pat Horgan had taken a penalty last year, but missed. This year he did the opposite and gave Cork a 1–1 to 0–3 lead. Lar Corbett had a chance beforehand to score a goal, but a great Save from Donal Óg sent it for a 65'. Cork then got two more points to get a three-point lead. Just a few minutes later, Cork would be up again and Pat Horgan cracked in another fine goal to give Cork a 2–5 to 0–9 lead at half time. Tipp would reduce the lead back to a point, but Cork answered them again. Cork would then score five points on the trot before Tipp would score again. With 10 minutes remaining, Cork's Jerry O'Connor gave a handpass to a free Aisike O'hAilpin who drove the ball into the net for the killing blow. Tipp would only score a small four points in the whole second half to be beaten by the Rebel's, 3–15 to 0–14 points.

Tipp's qualifier round 1 game was against Wexford in Semple Stadium on 3 July. The winner would go on while the loser's championship would be ended prematurely. Tipp started off well, and by half time they were 0–15 to 0–7 up. Right after the second half began, the game was effectively killed with two goals from Lar Corbett plus two points from play. The pace of the game slowed down and Tipp ran the game out winners on the scoreline 3–24 to 0–19.

Tipp's qualifier round 3 game was against Offaly in O'Moore Park, Portlaoise on 18 July. The winner would be back in an All-Ireland quarter-final. Tipp and Offaly both started well, but Tipp started putting more points away and were leading by six points, 0–7 to 0–1 after 20 minutes. Tipp finished out the half with a 9-point lead, 0–14 to 0–5 points. Offaly battled hard in the second half, but Tipp kept putting away the points and never relinquished the lead below 8 points until the final minute of the game where the Tipp backs were caught off guard and Offaly slotted home a goal to put the deficit to 6. The final score 0–21 to 1–12 to Tipp.

Tipp were back in Croke park once again for their All-Ireland quarter-final clash with Galway. The game started out at a blistering pace with Tipp and Galway getting scores. It was 0–4 to 0–1 till Galway's Eanna Ryan made it 0–4 to 1–1 with a fantastic goal. It was point for point till the score was 1–3 to 0–6 then 'Bonnar' Maher caught a great ball and handpassed it off to Eoin Kelly who finished it to give Tipp a 1–6 to 1–3 lead. Galway kept fighting back and staying in the game. Galway would gain a three-point lead, but points from Kelly and Brendan Maher brought it down to one before substitute Seamus Callinan blasted home a goal to make it 2–8 to 1–9 at half time. Galway had more fight in them and gained the lead once more thanks to a goal from Damien Hayes after a bad mistake from Paul Curran. Tipp battled back and the score was 2–10 a piece before Gearoid Ryan got Tipp the lead 3–10 to 2–10. Galway then got a penalty and Joe Canning stepped up and scored. Galway put over the points and were two points ahead with 5 minutes to go. Substitute John O'Brien scored a point and Gearoid added his point to tie it up with a minute to go. Other sub Pa Bourke got the ball on the 21 metre line and headed for goal before turning back and giving the ball to Lar Corbett. Lar Corbett put it over the bar for the lead. Galway had one minute to get an equalising point and had the ball 21 metres out and there was a ruckus with many players from each team fighting for the ball with a galway man lying on top of the ball. The ref deemed the ball wasn't going anywhere and blew up. Tipp winning 3–17 to 3–16

Tipp's Semi final against Waterford was on 15 August in Croke Park. The match started off very evenly with both teams going point for point up until they were 0–5 each. Tipp got a point before striking a goal from Lar Corbett, putting Tipp 5 points ahead. Waterford got some points, but the half finished Tipp 1–11 Waterford 0–8. Waterford started out the half strong and got the deficit back to three points, 1–12 to 0–12. However that was the closest they were going to get as Tipp scored another goal, this time Eoin Kelly. Tipp got more points and another goal from Eoin Kelly sealed the deal. With the game over before 5 minutes to go, Waterford snuck in and got a consolation goal from Eoin McGrath. The game ending on the score Tipp 3–19, Waterford 1–18.

Tipp reached the All-Ireland final for their 2nd time in a row to face last year's opponents Kilkenny on 5 September. The match began well as Kilkenny struggled for some time when they lost Henry Shefflin through an ongoing knee injury. Tipp got a goal in the tenth minute struck by Lar Corbett catching a high ball over kilkennys Noel Hickey, the resulting score gave Tipp a 5-point lead. Kilkenny did have a goal chance soon afterwards but was comfortably dealt with by Brendan Cummins. Kilkenny however got back in the game with points from Richie Power. Power scored Kilkenny's only goal just before half-time, but Tipp made sure Kilkenny never got the lead and Tipp went in at half-time Tipp 1–10 Kilkenny 1–9. Kilkenny began the 2nd half with points from Richie Power and the captain T.J. Reid to level up the game. However this year Kilkenny were dealing with a different animal similar to the Tipperary teams of the past which they struggled to beat as Tipp regained points by captain Eoin Kelly before Lar Corbett struck Tipp's 2nd goal in the 41st minute. Two minutes later Noel Mcgrath blasted Tipp's 3rd goal past P.J. Ryan to almost certainly destroy Kilkenny's dream of 5 in a row. With under 3 minutes to go Lar Corbett humiliated the kilkenny defence as he struck his 3rd goal, a first hat trick in a 70-minute all Ireland final as it ended Tipperary 4–17 to Kilkennys 1–18 with Tipp crowned All-Ireland champions denying their arch rivals a unique piece of history in what was supposed to be kilkenny hurlings finest hour, and the crowning achievement for manager Brian Cody.

'Intermediate' Tipp started their Munster campaign against Cork in the quarter-final in Páirc Uí Chaoimh on 30 May. Tipp started the brighter, getting a 1–4 to 0–1 lead with 11 minutes gone. But Cork would soon come back and at half time, led by two points. Cork and Tipp were nip and tuck until 'The Rebels' started to pull away. Tipp had chances to eat into Cork's lead, but to no avail. Cork beating Tipp on the scoreline 1–18 to 1–12.

'Under-21' Tipp started their Munster campaign against Cork in the semi-final in Páirc Uí Chaoimh on 15 July. Tipp and Cork started out point for point until Tipp went two points ahead for the first time at 0–6 to 0–4. Cork got a point back, but Tipp went back to two points ahead. It would once again go point for point until the 28th minute of the first half when Michael Heffernan got a goal. The first half ending 1–8 to 0–7. Tipp and Cork would start out evenly once again until Tipp would once again go ahead by two, then three and four. Tipp's dominance would soon end as Cork would get on top. Cork would keep hitting over points and went ahead with 8 minutes to go, 0–16 to 1–11. Cork would go two points ahead and it looked like Tipp's championship would end prematurely. With time nearly up, Tipp got a 21-metre free and a rasping shot from Seamus Hennessy tied it up 2–11 to 0–17. The game was set for extra time. Tipp started off the first half of extra time strong, scoring four unanswered points before Cork got their opener. Tipp would score another point and ended the first half, 2–16 to 0–18. The second half started out evenly with both teams wanting to finish strong. It was point for point until the final whistle, in which Tipp held onto win 2–17 to 0–21.

Tipp's first Munster Under-21 final since 2008 was against Clare on 28 July in Semple Stadium. Clare had a fantastic start getting 1–3 inside 3 minutes. Tipp then got three points in a row, but Clare pointed again. Tipp pulled it back to 1–5 to 0–5 and then got two points to put a single point in the game. Tipp ploughed on and added two more points to gain the lead, 0–10 to 1–6. Clare got another point before Senior Mikey Heffernan pulled on a rebounded shot to make it 1–10 to 1–7. The first half 1–12 to 1–9. The second half was much the same with both teams even in play. Clare brought Tipp's lead back to one point, but Tipp pulled away to a 1–16 to 1–11 lead before Clare got another point. It was then tit for tat as both teams got points one after another. Tipp held on to win their 20th Munster title on the score 1–22 to 1–17.

'Minor' Tipperary got their Munster championship campaign underway in Páirc Uí Chaoimh, against Cork on 28 April. The first round clash was the eagerly awaited rematch between the two since last years draw and replay. The game started off at a blistering pace with Cork registering two points, with Tipp drawing it up. Cork then got another two points before Tipp replied with an Aidan McCormack goal to tie it up 1–2 to 0–5. Tipp went ahead by a point, before Cork hit four points without reply. Tipp scored a point to go into half time behind by two points, 1–6 to Cork's 0–11. Tipp started the second half better with two points, before Cork got a goal. Tipp once again replied with another goal from McCormack. Tipp ahead 2–12 to 1–14, Cork got two more great points before a goal put them four points ahead, 2–12 to 2–16. After an exchange of many points, Tipp once again got a goal to put more pressure on the Rebels. With two minutes to go, a Tipp man was brought down in the square, but the referee did not blow for a penalty, which would have sealed the win for Tipp. Tipp got a free with seconds to go to go ahead, but Cork stuck in and grinded out the draw to bring the match to extra time, at a scoreline of 3–17 to 2–20. Extra time started off with both teams evenly matched. Tipp got a Cathal Horan goal, which snuck in past the Cork keeper to give Tipp the half time lead. The second half started with Cork taking a grasp of the game, going ahead. Cork stayed ahead by a point lead for most of the game and after a flurry of shots near the end of the game by Tipp, the final whistle blew. Cork winning 2–31 to 4–22.

Tipperary now played Clare in their semi-final play-off in Ennis on 5 May. Clare got off to the better start, getting a 0–4 to 0–1 lead after 11 minutes. The second half saw Clare keeping their lead, but Tipp clawing back to bringit to 0–7 to 0–6 at half time. Tipp started the second half better, by gaining the lead for the first time. Clare kept in touch however and it was a battle. Clare started to pull away and with 10 minutes to go, they were leading by 5 points with a Clare man just being sent off. Tipp fought back and scored two points plus a well-scored goal by Liam McGrath with thanks Paddy Dalton won some dirty ball then giving the pass to David Butler, before he gave the assist for the goal. With it being all square with 3 minutes to go, Clare got a massive point which sealed the victory for them and ensured Tipp would go no further in this year's championship. The final score was; Clare 0–17, Tipp 1–13. This was Tipp's first time failing to reach the Munster final since 2005.

=== Tipperary in the present (2011–) ===
2011 –

'Senior'

Tipperary started out their season as All-Ireland champions in the Waterford crystal cup against Waterford IT. Tipp were beaten. The league came next and Tipp faced Kilkenny. The game was close, but Kilkenny pulled away to win 1–17 to 1–10. Tipp's next game was against Dublin in Croke park. The year before, Dublin had beaten Tipp in Parnell Park. The game was slow and close, but Dublin finished the game winners on the scoreline 1–16 to 1–15. Tipp hadn't made the best start to the league, but got back on track with a home win against Waterford 1–20 to 1–18. Tipp got their second win of the campaign against Offaly in Nenagh, beating them 1–20 to 0–10. Tipp met Cork in Páirc Uí Chaoimh and it was a close encounter. Cork got a free at the death to win it, but Ben O'Connor hit it off the upright to signal the whistle and a draw was the result, 1–14 each. Tipp travelled to Galway in hopes of getting their third win. The game was close until half time, when Tipp tore away and demolished Galway 4–23 to 1–14. This win set Tipp up with an outside chance to qualify for the National league final. They had to win against Wexford while other results had to go their way. Tipp and Wexford was a generally one sided affair up until the last 10 minutes when Wexford fought back. A goal and a few points, plus a late equaliser from Pa Bourke signalled a draw. Tipp failed to qualify, but that draw kept Wexford (who were managed by former Tipp player and selector Colm Bonnar) in division 1 for 2012

Tipp began their All-Ireland title defence against Cork in Semple stadium on 29 May. Tipp and Cork were equal at the start. Tipp and Cork were drawing 5 times altogether in the half. Cork got the first point, but Tipp equalised soon after. It was point for point up until 0–7 each. Patrick Maher set up Lar Corbett for a goal and Tipp scored a point to make it 1–8 to 0–7 before Eoin Kelly scored a superb goal to make it 2–8 to 0–7. The half ended with Tipp up by 7 points, 2–11 to 0–10. Tipp started the second half better and kept up their lead to make it 8 points. Cork were not out of it yet and started a comeback. Point after point, they ate into the lead before they tied it up with 18 minutes to go. Tipp went back ahead with a Lar Corbett point and kept the lead. With 5 minutes to go there was 2 points in the game before Patrick Maher set up Benny Dunne scored the killer goal to make it 3–18 to 0–21. Tipp scored 4 more points and finished winners, 3–22 to 0–23. On 10 July Tipperary entered the Munster final in Páirc Uí Caoimhe as strong favourites against a Waterford side seen by the majority as a team who were on the slide. Tipp didn't disappoint their fans though and led by 5–10 to 0–08 points at the interval. Waterford showed some pride in the jersey in the 2nd half but it ended in an overall devouring by the premier, Tipp winning 7–19 to 0–19 points, Tipps Lar Corbett racking up an impressive tally of 4–4. Tipp headed for the capital in August in yet another All Ireland semi-final with Anthony Dalys Dublin providing the opposition. Dalys Dubs were big outsiders and Tipp were expected to walk on into another final with Kilkenny but Tipp didn't have their own way running out winners by 1–19 to 0–18 points, an early Lar Corbett goal doing the damage. Tipp went into Act 3 of the Kilkenny saga with the tie poised at 1 win each. This was expected to be a thriller but all in all it was a poor spectacle. Kilkenny controlled the game for large parts and despite a late Pa Bourke goal to give Tipp hope, they never looked like losing it. A shocking point of this game was Tipps main man Corbett being held scoreless by Kilkenny defender Jackie Tyrell. All in all despite losing the final, Declan Ryans first year in charge was considered a general success by the majority and big things were hoped for 2012. The 2012 season started with a sloppy league campaign which saw them beaten easily by Jimmy Barry Murphys rebels in the semi-final but nothing really gets read into the league any more. The first round on the championship saw Limerick visit Semple Stadium on 27 May. Limerick looked like causing an upset for 60 minutes of the game and if it wasn't for a spectacular Brendan Cummins save to deny Shane Dowling, it would have been the back door route once again. Tipps bench came to the rescue and they scrape through by 4 points on a scoreline of 2–20 to 1–19. It was the same story in Páirc Uí Caoimhe against the rebels. Tipp were sluggish by their own standards again and had Cork been able to take their chances, it could have been a different story. Tipp prevailed by the narrowest of margins on a scoreline of 1–22 to 0–24 points. Another Munster final beckoned against familiar foes Waterford. Tipp were strong favourites again and despite not hitting top gear they never looked like being beaten. The return of Lar Corbett from his brief retirement spell was the main point of the game with Lar failing to score. Tipp ran out winners on a scoreline of 2–17 to 0–16 points. After Galways exploits in Leinster, it meant Tipp and Kilkenny would meet at an earlier stage this year. On 20 August 2012 both sides lined out in Croke Park for the All Ireland semi-final. Kilkenny started as favourites and to some it was make or break for them. The first half was sluggish enough with both sides trading blows. Brendan Cummins kept Tipp in it with a great save from Colin Fennelley but it wasn't long before they finally rattled the net with Henry Shefflin laying off a sublime handpass to TJ Reid who snapped up the gift. Tipp responded though and hit 1–3 without reply with the goal coming from Pa Bourke with help from the persistence of Corbett.Tipp led at the break 1–10 to 1–09. The 2nd half was a different story, Kilkenny came out on a mission and goals from Reid again, Aidan Fogarty and Eoin Larkin succumbed Tipp to their heaviest defeat since the 1800s. After the game, the majority were skeptical of the tactics employed by Tipp with their star striker Corbett sent out to follow Tommy Walsh around for the game. It is surely the end for the management team of Declan Ryan, Michael Gleeson and Tommy Dunne and we await the rebuilding process of this potentially great Tipp team.

'Intermediate' Tipp met Cork in the opening round. Tipp and Cork were equal for most of the first half and Tipp squandered 3 goal chances in the last 5 minutes of the half. However, Cork showed their superior hurling skills and powered onto a convincing victory, 2–16 to 2–12.

'Under-21'

'Minor' Tipp started out their Munster campaign against Waterford in Walsh Park, Waterford. After a poor first half, Tipp were left with nine points adrift. After a shaky start to the second half, Tipp scored a goal and the flood gates opened. Tipp brought the deficit to one point but Waterford kept their cool and went on to win by six points.

Tipp then went to meet Cork in Semple Stadium, Thurles. This was a winner takes all situation. The first half was very close and there was only three points in it, Tipp leading 2–5 to 0–8. Cork started the second half well and scored a goal and put much pressure on the Tipp backs. Cork could have got at least two goals if it wasn't for poor shooting and good goalkeeping. Tipp however kept going and powered on to win 2–16 to 1–9. Tipp go onto meet Clare in the semi-final.

2012 –

The 2012 season was Declan Ryan's second year in charge of the Tipperary team, the second year of his initial two-year term since succeeding Liam Sheedy. In January the management appointed Paul Curran of Mullinahone as new captain and Pádraic Maher of Thurles Sarsfields as vice captain. In March, Tipperary won their first trophy of the year by capturing the Waterford Crystal Cup against Clare in Sixmilebridge by 1–21 to 2–12. Tipperary played Waterford in the Munster final with Tipperary retaining their title, their 40th Munster title overall with a seven-point victory. In the All-Ireland semi-final Tipperary had their heaviest defeat in the Championship since 1897, with Kilkenny blowing them away by scoring 4-24, 3–15 in the second half to leave them with an eighteen-point defeat. On 25 September, Eamon O'Shea succeeded Declan Ryan as manager of the Tipperary senior team.

2013 –

2014 –

2015 –

2016 –

== Football ==
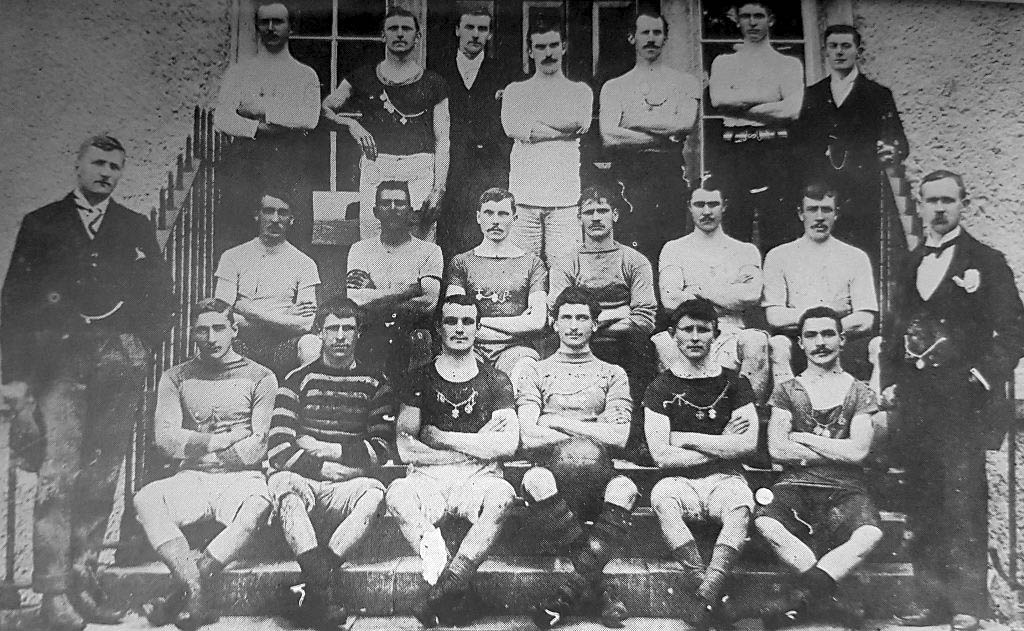
Team of Tipperary, 1895 All-Ireland champions

Tipp started out football the same as hurling. Winning the second ever All Ireland in 1889 and another in, 1895 and, 1900 . Tipp were a force, but still behind teams like Dublin and Cork. They won their last in 1920, the year Michael Hogan was shot on Bloody Sunday in Croke Park. Tipp went on a very long famine there after. They were beaten by a dramatic last minute goal by Cavan in 1935 when it appeared they were back in the All-Ireland final.

Recent performances suggest that Tipperary's footballers preserve some of the traditions of a time when they won four All-Ireland titles, completing the hurling-football "double" in 1895 and 1900. And although they never won another Munster Championship AFTER 1935, Browne's superb goal against Kerry in a match Tipp might have won in 1997 and the defeat of Clare and stubborn Munster final performance in 1998 showed that they have not lost the aspiration. Tipperary have not beaten Kerry in a Championship match since 1928 nor Cork since 1944, but the Minor footballers went to the All-Ireland final in 1984 and the under-21s were beaten in a replayed Munster final in 1987.

=== Back in the big picture (2008–2010) ===
2008 –

2008 marked an historical year for Tipperary football; they stayed in the running for the 2009 Sam Maguire by gaining promotion to the National League division 3, but lost to Offaly in the final. The seniors then bowed out of the Munster championship to Limerick, who would go on to nearly beat Cork and then beat Meath in the qualifiers. Then they only scored 6 points against Westmeath to bow out of the 2008 Football running.

But the minors will be remembered for their run; they got into the Munster final against Kerry and pulled the game from Kerry's grasp to earn a draw, but on the second day were massacred by a better team. They then entered the quarter-finals against Leinster champions Meath. It seemed inevitable at half time that Meath would win, and though Tipp did bring their lead back to 2 points, they lost.

2009 – 'Senior' Tipperary will be playing in Division 2 of the National football league in 2010 after securing promotion from division 3 the year after they had just been promoted from division 4. On 25 April 2009 they defeated Down by 0–18 to 1–14 after extra time in the NFL Division 3 final. On 24 May, the senior team bowed out of the Munster Championship at the quarter-final stage against Limerick by 1–11 to 1–9. Limerick had led by 1–6 to no score in the first half, but Tipperary produced a comeback in the second half to eventually lose by two points. On 4 July, Tipperary beat Louth by 2–10 to 1–12 in Drogheda in the All Ireland Senior football qualifiers Round 1. Tipp and Louth were nip and tuck for most of the game, then Tipp got goals from Barry Grogan and Philip Austin. Tipp led by 7 points midway through the half, but Louth, after missing a penalty earlier, scored from their second and made it a tight finish. Tipp held on to win by a point, with both teams having lost a man to a red card. Tipperary next faced Sligo in round 2 of the qualifiers in Semple Stadium and they were underdogs against a team who fought hard against Galway. They started off poor and gave away many points and eventually a goal which gave them a 9-point gap to fill. Tipp came back however and pushed the deficit to 1 point, thanks to a goal from Brian Mulvihill, but Damien O'Brien missed a chance to get the equaliser with a few minutes to go. Sligo ended up beating Tipp by 1–13 to 1–12, ending their run in the 2009 Championship. On 31 October, a Michael Hogan memorial game will take place in Semple Stadium against the 2009 Munster Champions and beaten All-Ireland finalists Cork. This game was due to commence earlier in the year, but weather had halted proceedings. The original fixture was Tipp v Kilkenny in Senior Hurling and Kerry v Dublin in Senior Football.

'Junior' In the Munster Junior Football Championship, Tipp were beaten by Limerick in Semple Stadium by 0–15 to 1–8. They are now out of the running for the Munster and All Ireland and will not take part in any more matches in 2009.

'Under 21' Tipperary Under 21 football team was narrowly beaten in the Munster final against Cork 1–9 to 2–5 in Semple Stadium. Tipp and Cork provided exciting football throughout the game, but was pipped at the post by a late goal by Cork's Noel Galvin. Tipp failed to clear the ball in time and the goal was scored near the square. Right at the end, a Cork midfielder had blatantly picked the ball off the ground about 40 yards from goal, but the ref did not give a free. That was Tipp's third Munster final loss in a row.

'Minor' On 13 May, the Minor football team got to a second consecutive Munster Minor football final after beating Cork in Páirc Uí Chaoimh by 0–13 to 0–10 after extra time. On 5 July, Tipp lost 0–12 to 0–06 against Kerry in the Munster Minor football championship final in Páirc Uí Chaoimh, Cork. Tipp didn't pose Kerry any threat and they only scored 1 point in the first half. They started out the second with 3 points on the trot, but Kerry assumed dominance once more to win. On 3 August, Tipp lost to Mayo in O'Connor Park, Tullamore 1–8 to 2–11. Tipp are now out of the running for the All Ireland and may not take part in any more matches in 2009.

2010 –

'Senior' Tipp started out the year in the preliminary round of the McGrath cup against the University of Limerick at Sean Treacy Park, Tipperary town. The match ended in a win for Tipp. The match started out evenly with both teams hitting points back and forth. UL then scored a goal, assisted by a current Tipp footballer, Brian Fox. The half time score was 1–7 to 0–8. The second half started out as the first with UL keeping their advantage till the 60th minute when Tipp scored a cracking goal from the 20. Tipp then hit another point before scoring the winning goal to make it 2–9 to 1–9. Former Senior hurler Ryan O Dwyer and a UL player were sent off during the second half. Tipp got off to another great start in the McGrath cup quarter-final against LIT in Dr. Morris Park, Thurles. The game was close for the majority but Tipp finished the job 2–13 to 2–6. Tipperary's Timmy Dalton having a starting role for LIT getting 3 points. Barry Grogan getting 7 points to see Tipp win. They then faced Kerry in the semi-final of the McGrath cup. The match was in Fitzgerald Stadium, Killarney on 24 January. Tipp opened the scoring with a beautiful sideline free by Stephen Hahessy. Kerry then took control and scored 7 points to Tipp's 3. Tipp started off better and scored three points in a row in the second half, but Kerry replied with two more. With the score at 0–9 to 0–11, Tipp then had a moment of brilliance with great passing play with George Hannigan ending up with a placed goal. Tipp led by a point, but Kerry soon equalised and with time running out, Kerry stole the ball from Tipp's backs and put over the winning score, 0–13 to 1–9.

Tipps National league campaign started against Laois in Portlaoise. Tipp started off poorly. Going behind by an early two points, they wouldn't lead for the entire match. They went in at half time 1–9 to 0–2 down. Tipp came out in the second half on fire and put over a rapid succession of points to put it 1–10 to 0–6. Tipp fought back yet again and with 10 minutes to go, a long ball ended up in the Laois Keepers hands in brought behind for a strange own goal. With the score 1–11 to 1–9, Tipp got two massive points to make it 1–11 each. Tipp then gave away two points within 40 seconds to go behind 1–13 to 1–11. Near the end, Tipp got a line ball near the '65 and was going to be taken quickly, but for the Laois selector holding back the Tipp player. A small argument ensued and then the ball was kicked down near the end line. It was kept in brilliantly by Barry Grogan's fist and went to Seamus Grogan, who missed a certain winning goal, driving it wide. Laois won by 2 points. Tipp's second game in the League was on 13 February against Kildare in Semple Stadium. The game was never a contest right from the start, as Kildare got an early goal, Tipp would never draw the match up or lead. With good scores from Barry Grogan and Conor Sweeney frees, Tipp weren't too far off at half time, 1–5 to 0–4 at half time. Any attempts of a comeback were flattened with two second half points scored early by Kildare. Dermot Earley proving too strong in midfield for Tipp. Tipp never looked like their second half selves in Portlaoise and the final score was Kildare 1–17, Tipp 0–8. Hugh Coughlan was sent off for Tipp after striking a Kildare player early in the second half. Tipp's third-round game was against Down in Páirc Esler, Newry. Down started off the better, getting an early five-point lead. By 20 minutes, Tipp were down 0–7 to 0–2. Tipp then hit four points in row to narrow the gap. Down got one more point, while Tipp scored a goal in the final minute of the first half to leave it 1–6 to 0–8. Tipp got an early point in the second half. Tipp ended up 0–14 to 1–8 with 10 minutes to go, but three frees from Barry Grogan ensured Tipp left with a point at the final score of 0–14 to 1–11 Tipp's 4th-round game was against Meath in Semple Stadium on 14 March. Tipp started off getting a 0–4 points to 0–1 lead and stayed ahead for the half. Tipp leading by 3 points, but a late rally from Meath made the lead 0–6 to 0–4, before Tipp got a last point. The second half was much the same with Tipp keeping their lead. With 15 minutes to go, Tipp were awarded a penalty, which was converted by Barry Grogan. Tipp led by 1–9 to 0–9, but a Meath point keeping the game within one score. Tipp held on to win 1–9 to 0–10. Tipp's fifth round league game was against Donegal in Semple Stadium on 13 March. Tipp started off straight away with Barry Grogan spurning a goal chance, with Donegal getting a point straight after. Tipp later were graced with a goal from a 45, when the ball flew over Donegal keeper Paul Durcan's head and into the net. The first half ended 0–6 to 1–1. Tipp started off the second half the same, keeping with Donegal. Donegal then got a goal to make it 1–9 to 1–3. Later on, a mis kick from John Cagney reached the on running Robbie Costigan to punch in a goal, to make it a tight finish. Tipp brought the tie back to a point, but even though 4 minutes of added time were played, Tipp failed to get the equaliser. Tipp losing 1–9 to 2–5. Tipp's 6th-round game was against Armagh in Crossmaglen. Tipp needed to win to stay in Division 2. Armagh went 4 points ahead and led by all of 11 points at half time. Tipp once again pulled a turn around and two goals from Barry Grogan to draw it up, set up a grandstand finish. This never materialised and Armagh won by 4 points, 1–15 to 2–8. Tipp are now relegated to Division 3, even if they beat Westmeath in the 7th round. Tipp's 7th-round game was against Westmeath in Semple Stadium, Thurles. This game had no effect on the Division 3 table as both teams were relegated. Tipp started off poorly, giving away a goal, but came back by the 29th minute with a George Hannigan goal, making it 1–6 to 1–4 at half time. Tipp started the second half well, with Barry Grogan getting a goal, but Westmeath fought back. But with 10 minutes remaining, Tipp hit six points, while Westmeath could only put over 1 to give Tipp a 6-point win, 2–13 to 1–10. Tipp finished the NFL Division 2 table in 7th place with 5 points, just one point behind Laois and Kildare who both finished on 6 points.

Tipp's Munster Senior football championship started on 16 May in Semple Stadium against 2009 All-Ireland champions, Kerry. Tipp were massive underdogs going into the game. The game started with a point to Kerry, but Tipp soon equalised with a great 45' from Barry Grogan. Tipp shocked Kerry with a well-made goal from Hugh Coughlan to make it 1–1 to 0–1. Peter Acheson scored to make it 1–2, but Kerry came back to make it 0–5 to 1–2. The game was to be close till half time, with the teams equal in scores on three occasions. Tipp had a chance to go two points ahead at half-time, but Kerry scored to go a point ahead at half time, 0–8 to 1–4. The second half began as Kerry stepped up a gear and soon went ahead by two, before Bryan Sheehan getting his goal to give Kerry a six-point lead. Tipp fought back however and got a goal, much to the dismay of the Kerry goalkeeper, Brendan Kealy, who was making his debut. A long ball to Barry Grogan saw the keeper scrambling jump for the ball, just to leave him punch it into the net. Tipp never kicked on after that and Kerry once again got back on top. Kerry upped another gear to go another couple of points ahead, before Bryan Sheehan scored his second goal to finish the tie off. The final score was Kerry 2–18, Tipp 2–6. Tipp now enter the qualifiers once again.

Tipp now entered the qualifiers. Their first round match was against Laois in Semple Stadium on 27 June. Tipp were looking to win two qualifier games in two years for the first time. The game started out close and would remain throughout. Tipp and Laois would trade scores up until the 21st minute when Tipp went two points ahead for the first time in the game. Laois would answer, but Tipp got back to two points. Laois would fight on and the half time score was a draw 0–7 each. Tipp would start the second half like the first, going ahead again and trading more points. Tipp kept pointing until they were two points ahead with seven minutes to go, 0–12 to 0–10. Laois were not beaten as they brought it level with one minute to go. It looked like extra-time was on the cards, but sub Brian Mulvihill scored his second point of the day to give Tipp the lead. Laois failed to get the equaliser and Tipp won their first game in the championship since 2009 against Louth.

'Junior' Tipp's Munster Championship got underway at Semple Stadium against Kerry on 16 May. As in the Senior, Tipp were massive underdogs and it was to show in the next hour. Kerry showed their class early on and took a lead they would never relinquish. The game was dominated by Kerry. Tipp surprisingly weren't beaten by the scoreline predicted and stayed rather more in the game than expected. Near the nd, Tipp had many chances to close the gap, but spurned the chances. Kerry knocked out Tipp on the scoreline 1–13 to 0–9.

'Under-21' Tipp started off in the Munster semi-final against Limerick in Semple Stadium on 18 March. Tipp were looking to get into their fourth Munster Under-21 football final in a row, something which has never been achieved by Tipp. Tipp went into a 0–8 to 0–3 lead in the first half, but Limerick kept the tie close with a fisted goal before the first half ended, the half time score being 0–8 to 1–3. Limerick kept hitting points back and kept the alight when they scored their second goal to close the gap. Tipp only led by a point in the closing stages, but registered 4 points in a row to win. Tipp beat Limerick 0–16 to 2–5 and continue onto their 4th consecutive final.

On 31 March, Tipp played Kerry in Austin Stack Park, Tralee. This was Tipperary's fourth Munster final in a row, a first for Tipp. Tipp started out with the breeze and scored the opening point, but soon went behind after a Kerry goal after 7 minutes. Tipp went further behind when Kerry put over two more points to make it 1–2 to 0–1. Tipp would fight back and a few points, topped off by a Bernard O'Brien goal made it 1–4 to 1–2 at half time. Kerry started the second half well, scoring 3 points to go ahead 1–5 to 1–4, but put over three consecutive wides before Tipp once again fought back to make it 1–7 to 1–5. With the match near over, Kerry put over a point to make it a hectic finish. Tipp held on however to win their first ever Munster title in the grade at 1–7 to 1–6. This was also Tipp's first victory over Kerry in the grade. Tipp's first ever All-Ireland semi-final was against Donegal on 17 April in Parnell Park, Dublin. Tipp's first half was poor, only scoring one point. Tipp had a chance to get a goal, but it came off the crossbar after the keeper saved it. Donegal's All-Star, Michael Murphy also could've got a goal, But the halftime score was 0–3 to 0–1 to Donegal. The second began horrendously for Tipp as they conceding two early points and then full back Ciaran McDonald got sent off for a second bookable offence. Tipp got three points over the course of the second half, but Donegal's nine second half points sealed the win for and Tipp's chance of getting to their first Under-21 All-Ireland football was gone. The game finished 0–12 to 0–4 to Donegal.

'Minor' Tipp started off their Munster campaign against the 2009 Munster champions, Kerry, in the quarter-finals, played in Austin Stack Park, Tralee. Tipp took their time and scored their first point, after Kerry had scored 1–3. Tipp second half was much better and fought back, with Shane Leahy and Liam Boland getting the goals. Kerry held on to win by 2 points, 1–12 to 2–7. Tipp's next Munster game was a Semi-final play-off game against Clare in Semple Stadium on 24 April to see who would meet Cork in the semi-final. The game was a poorly played affair in which the half time scores were 0–3 to 0–1 at half time. Clare piled on the pressure and went 1–3 to 0–4 up. Tipp now in turn took the game by the scruff and got a Liam Treacy goal, coupled with the fact a Clare man got sent off minutes before. With Tipp now 1–6 to 0–4, They scored two more points to seal the victory and a second successive Semi-final encounter with Cork. Tipp's semi-final against Cork was on 12 May in Semple Stadium. This was Tipp's last chance to seal their Munster Final place for the third year in a row. Cork started out much better, scoring four points in the first quarter, while on the 13th, Billy Hewitt scored for Tipp to make it 0–4 to 0–1. The next period of the first half would be crucial to the overall shape of the game. Cork scored two goals in the next 15 minutes, but Tipp also created goal chances, spurning a simple effort wide with 5 minutes to go. Tipp finally got their goal with two minutes of injury time gone and left eight points between the teams at half time. Tipp started the second half much better and started to make a game of it, but left it till late. A few good points, plus a Liam McGrath goal turned the game around it seemed. A few missed chances from Tipp failed to give them the lead as Cork kept their nerve to win. The final score Cork 2–12, Tipp 2–9. Both Tipp's minor teams gone before June.

=== Tipp in transition once again (2011–) ===
2011 –

'Senior' Tipp began their new division 3 campaign with a win against Limerick. But then Tipp went on a run of three consecutive losses to Louth, Westmeath and Waterford. Tipp got back on terms with wins against Offaly and Wexford. Coming into the last game, a win against Cavan plus other results going their way would bring Tipp to the Division 3 final. However a loss and a win for Waterford would signal a relegation to division 4. Tipp lost to Cavan but a loss for Waterford kept Tipp safe in division 3 for another year.

Tipp opened their Munster championship with a second first round meeting with Kerry in two years. Tipp hoped to improve on last years performance. Tipp started out the first half strong and kept within 3 points during the half. Kerry would prove their strength and power on in the second half. Not even going down to 10 men with the loss of Tomas O'Se could halt Kerrys bid for a Munster semi-final place with Limerick. Tipp lost by 11 points in the end, 2–16 to 0–11. Tipp missed 3 chances on goal, two that came off the post while one was dis-allowed for being a square ball.

'Junior' Tipp began their Junior championship against Kerry in Fitzgerald stadium, Killarney. The first half was even, with both teams finishing on 1–7 each. But Kerry would up the tempo in the second half and win comfortably, 2–16 to 1–8.

'Under-21' Tipp began their first Munster Under-21 title defence against Waterford in Dungarvan. Tipp had too much strength for the Deise and finished 1–14 to 1–4. This meant a game against the 2009 All-Ireland champions, Cork. Cork had control of the entire game and ended Tipp's reign prematurely, on the scoreline 0–21 to 2–3. Tipp's first reign as Munster Under-21 champions ended in a semi-final.

'Minor' Tipp started their Munster championship against Limerick in Kilmallock. Tipp won and so gained the right to face Kerry in the semi-final. Tipp faced Kerry in Semple stadium in the Munster semi-final. Tipp were always second best in the first half, trailing by 11 points at one stage before ending the half 10 points down. The second half would prove better however. Tipp fought back and brought the game to a draw with a minute to go before they got a free. Tipp scored the free and won the game. Tipp now qualify for the Munster final against Cork.

2016 –

'Senior' In June 2016, Tipperary reached the Munster final after a 3–15 to 2–16 win against Cork. They lost the final 3–17 to 2–10. They went on to defeat Derry by 1–21 to 2–17 in round 3A of the qualifiers to reach the All Ireland Quarter-finals for the first time. On 31 July 2016, Tipperary defeated Galway by 3–13 to 1–10 in the 2016 All-Ireland Quarter-finals at Croke Park as they reached their first All-Ireland semi-final since 1935. On 21 August 2016, Tipperary were beaten in the semi-final by Mayo on a 2–13 to 0–14 scoreline.

== Camogie ==
Tipp started winning All-Ireland's very late.

=== Tipp's greatest camogie era ===
It all started in 1999 when Tipperary won their first All Ireland senior title against hurling rivals Kilkenny 0–12 to 1–8 in a close contest.

In 2000, Tipp won their very first 2 in a row when beating other hurling rivals Cork in the final, 2–11 to 1–9.

In 2001, Tipp made history, winning their first ever 3 in a row, once again beating Kilkenny in the final, 4–13 to 1–6 in a very one sided contest.

In 2002, they made their fourth final appearance in a row, but the four in a row was stopped by Cork.

In 2003, They would reached their fifth final and made it 4 out of 6 when they beat Cork 2–11 to 1–11 in a gripping encounter.

In 2004, they would win their second 2 in a row, once again beating The Rebelettes in the final, 2–11 to 1–9. This would be their last win in a final.

In 2005, they would reach their 7th final in a row, but were beaten by Cork

In 2006, their 8th final wouldn't be any different, losing to Cork once more. This would be their last final to date.

== Ladies' football ==
Tipp took no time in establishing themselves in the ladies' football world.

=== Beginnings (1974–1980) ===
In 1974, the inaugural year of the competition, they would redeem their 'Premier' status by winning the first Ladies' football all Ireland title against Offaly 2–3 to 2–2.

In 1975, they would once again grace the final, this time against Galway. Tipp beat Galway and historically won the county's only 2 in a row. Not even the men's footballers have achieved two All Irelands in a row.

In 1980, it had been five years since Tipp won, and went on to win their third ever and last All Ireland title, against Cavan.

=== Tipp in the 21st century ===
In 2008, long after their initial wins, Tipp faced Clare in the Junior All Ireland final, in which they won.

Tipp led the football roll of honour until 1983, in which Kerry drew with them at 3 a piece. Becoming the first county to Top both Senior lists in Hurling and Ladies' football, also being on joint top of the roll of honour in men's football in 1889. No county has ever topped all four; Tipp have topped three, with no chance of topping the camogie.
