= Tom Semple =

Irish hurler (1879–1943)

Personal information
- Native name: Tomás Semple (Irish)
- Born: 8 April 1879 Drombane, County Tipperary, Ireland
- Died: 11 April 1943 (aged 64) Thurles, County Tipperary, Ireland
- Occupation: Railway guard

Sport
- Sport: Hurling
- Position: Half-forward
Club
- Years: Club
- Thurles
Club titles
- Tipperary titles: 6
Inter-county
- Years: County
- 1897-1909: Tipperary
Inter-county titles
- Munster titles: 4
- All-Irelands: 3

Thomas Semple (8 April 1879 – 11 April 1943) was an Irish hurler who played as a half-forward for the Tipperary senior team.

He began his career with the team during the 1897 championship and became a regular starter until his retirement following the 1909 championship. Over his tenure, he secured three All-Ireland medals and four Munster medals. Having been an All-Ireland runner-up once, Semple led the team to All-Ireland victories in 1906 and 1908.

At club level Semple was a six-time county club championship medalist with Thurles.

== Playing career ==
=== Club ===
Semple played his club hurling with the local club in Thurles, the precursor to the famous Sarsfield's club. He rose through the club and served as captain of the team for almost a decade.

In 1904 Semple won his first championship medal following a walkover from Lahorna De Wets.

Thurles failed to retain their title, however, the team returned to the championship decider once again in 1906. A 4-11 to 3-6 defeat of Lahorna De Wets gave Semple his second championship medal as captain. It was the first of four successive championships for Thurles as subsequent defeats of Lahorna De Wets, Glengoole and Racecourse/Grangemockler brought Semple's medal tally to five.

Five-in-a-row proved beyond Thurles, however, Semple's team reached the final for the sixth time in eight seasons in 1911. A 4-5 to 1-0 trouncing of Toomevara gave Semple his sixth and final championship medal as captain.

=== Inter-county ===
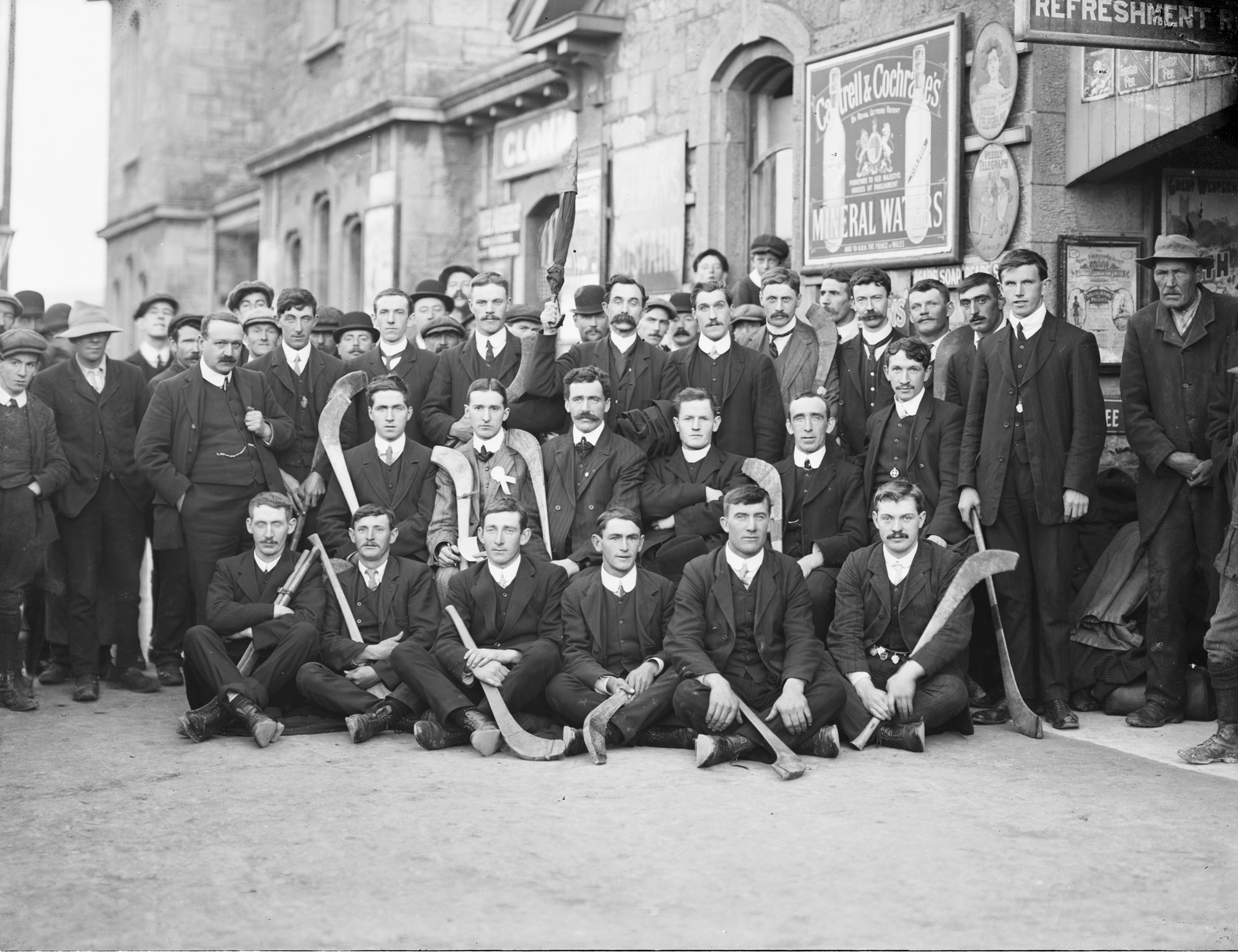
Tipperary Hurling Team outside Clonmel railway station, August 26, 1910. Semple is in the centre of the middle row.

Semple's skill quickly brought him to the attention of the Tipperary senior hurling selectors. After briefly joining the team in 1897, he had to wait until 1900 to become a regular member of the starting seventeen. That year a 6-11 to 1-9 trouncing of Kerry gave him his first Munster medal. Tipp later narrowly defeated Kilkenny in the All-Ireland semi-final before trouncing Galway in the "home" All-Ireland final. This was not the end of the championship campaign because, for the first year ever, the "home" finalists had to take on London in the All-Ireland decider. The game was a close affair with both sides level at five points with eight minutes to go. London then took the lead; however, they later conceded a free. Tipp's Mikey Maher stepped up, took the free and a forward charge carried the sliotar over the line. Tipp scored another goal following a weak puck out and claimed a 2-5 to 0-6 victory. It was Semple's first All-Ireland medal.

Cork dominated the provincial championship for the next five years; however, Tipp bounced back in 1906. That year Semple was captain for the first time as Tipp foiled Cork's bid for an unprecedented sixth Munster title in-a-row. The score line of 3-4 to 0-9 gave Semple a second Munster medal. Tipp trounced Galway by 7-14 to 0-2 on their next outing, setting up an All-Ireland final meeting with Dublin. Semple's side got off to a bad start with Dublin's Bill Leonard scoring a goal after just five seconds of play. Tipp fought back with Paddy Riordan giving an exceptional display of hurling and capturing most of his team's scores. Ironically, eleven members of the Dublin team hailed from Tipperary. The final score of 3-16 to 3-8 gave victory to Tipperary and gave Semple a second All-Ireland medal.

Tipp lost their provincial crown in 1907, however, they reached the Munster final again in 1908. Semple was captain of the side again that year as his team received a walkover from Kerry in the provincial decider. Another defeat of Galway in the penultimate game set up another All-Ireland final meeting with Dublin. That game ended in a 2-5 to 1-8 draw and a replay was staged several months later in Athy. Semple's team were much sharper on that occasion. A first-half goal by Hugh Shelly put Tipp well on their way. Two more goals by Tony Carew after the interval gave Tipp a 3-15 to 1-5 victory. It was Semple's third All-Ireland medal.

1909 saw Tipp defeat arch rivals Cork in the Munster final once again. A 2-10 to 1-6 victory gave Semple his fourth Munster medal. The subsequent All-Ireland final saw Tipp take on Kilkenny. The omens looked good for a Tipperary win. It was the county's ninth appearance in the championship decider and they had won the previous eight. All did not go to plan as this Kilkenny side cemented their reputation as the team of the decade. A 4-6 to 0-12 defeat gave victory to "the Cats" and a first final defeat to Tipperary. Semple retired from inter-county hurling following this defeat.

== Personal life ==
Semple was born in Drombane, County Tipperary in 1879. He received a limited education at his local national school and, like many of his contemporaries, finding work was a difficult prospect. At the age of 16 Semple left his native area and moved to Thurles. Here he worked as a guardsman with the Great Southern & Western Railway.

In retirement from playing Semple maintained a keen interest in Gaelic games. In 1910 he and others organised a committee which purchased the showgrounds in Thurles in an effort to develop a hurling playing field there. This later became known as Thurles Sportsfield and is regarded as one of the best surfaces for hurling in Ireland. In 1971 it was renamed Semple Stadium in his honour. The stadium is also lovingly referred to as Tom Semple's field.

Semple also held the post of chairman of the Tipperary County Board and represented the Tipperary on the Munster Council and Central Council. He also served as treasurer of the latter organization. During the War of Independence Semple played an important role for Republicans. He organized dispatches via his position with the Great Southern & Western Railway in Thurles.

Tom Semple died on 11 April 1943.

Sporting positions
Preceded by	Tipperary Senior Hurling Captain; 1906-1909	Succeeded by Tim Gleeson
Achievements
Preceded by D.J. Stapleton (Kilkenny)	All-Ireland Senior Hurling Final winning captain 1906	Succeeded by Dick 'Drug' Walsh (Kilkenny)
Preceded by Dick 'Drug' Walsh (Kilkenny)	All-Ireland Senior Hurling Final winning captain 1908	Succeeded by Dick 'Drug' Walsh (Kilkenny)
