= Dublin–Tipperary hurling rivalry =

Sports rivalry in Ireland

Dublin-Tipperary
- Location: County Dublin; County Tipperary
- Teams: Dublin; Tipperary
- First meeting: 1896
- Next meeting: TBA

Statistics
- Total meetings: 11
- All-time series: Championship: Tipperary 9–1 Dublin (1 draw)
- Largest victory: Tipperary 8-14 - 0-4 Dublin (1896)

The Dublin–Tipperary rivalry is a hurling rivalry between Irish county teams Dublin and Tipperary. Both teams play provincial hurling, Tipperary in the Munster Senior Hurling Championship and Dublin in the Leinster Senior Hurling Championship. All of their championship meetings have been in the All-Ireland Senior Hurling Championship, the first being in 1896.

The first meeting between the sides in 46 years occurred in 2007 All-Ireland Qualifiers at Parnell Park where Tipperary won by 1-20 to 1-11. Their next meeting was in the 2011 All-Ireland Semi-final at Croke Park where Tipperary won by 1-19 to 0-18.

== Statistics ==
Up to date as of 2023 season

Team	All-Ireland	Provincial	National League	Total
Dublin	6	24	3	33
Tipperary	28	42	19	89
Combined	34	66	22	122

== Championship meetings ==
27 March 1898
All Ireland Final

Tipperary	8-14 – 0-4	Dublin

Jones's Road, Dublin
Attendance: c.8,000
Referee: D. Wood (Dublin)
27 October 1907
All Ireland Final

Tipperary	3-16 – 3-8	Dublin

Kilkenny
25 April 1909
All Ireland Final

Tipperary	2-5 – 1-8	Dublin

Jones's Road, Dublin
27 June 1909
Final replay

Tipperary	3-15 – 1-5	Dublin

Athy
28 October 1917
All Ireland Final

Dublin	5-4 – 4-2	Tipperary

Croke Park
Attendance: 12,000
Referee: W Walsh
7 September 1930
All Ireland Final

Tipperary	5-6 - 3-6	Dublin

Croke Park
Attendance: 21,730
Referee: S Jordan (Galway)
3 September 1961
All Ireland Final

Tipperary	0-16 – 1-12	Dublin
J Doyle 0-9, Nealon 0-3, O'Gara 0-2, Moloughney 0-1, McKenna 0-1.		Jackson 1-2, A Boothman 0-5, Shannon 0-3, D Foley 0-1, B Boothman 0-1.

Croke Park
Attendance: 67,866
Referee: G Fitzgerald (Limerick)
7 July 2007
Round 2

Dublin	1-11 - 1-20	Tipperary
P Carton 1-1, K Dunne 0-3, A McCrabbe 0-2 (0-1f), R O'Carroll, D Qualter, J Kelly, D Curtin (0-1f), S Mullen 0-1 each.	Report	W Ryan 0-10 (0-6), L Corbett 1-1, E Kelly 0-3 (0-1f), S Butler 0-2, B Dunne, F Devanney, D Egan, S McGrath 0-1.

Parnell Park
Referee: D Connolly (Kilkenny)
14 August 2011
3:30pm
All Ireland Semi-final

Tipperary	1-19 - 0-18	Dublin
L Corbett (1-3), E Kelly (0-6, 2f, 3 '65), N McGrath (0-3, 1 sideline), Padraic Maher (0-2), G Ryan (0-2), P Bourke (0-1), S McGrath (0-1), S Callanan (0-1).	Report	P Ryan (0-9, 6f, 1 '65), P Kelly (0-1), J Boland (0-1), A McCrabbe (0-1), R O'Dwyer (0-1), L Rushe (0-1), D O'Callaghan (0-1), L Ryan (0-1), M O'Brien (0-1), S Ryan (0-1).

Croke Park, Dublin
Attendance: 43,562
Referee: C McAllister (Cork)
27 July 2014
16:00
All Ireland Quarter-final

Tipperary	2-23 - 0-16	Dublin
S Callanan (0-11, 7 frees, 2 ‘65’s); J O’Dwyer (2-2, 0-1 free); G Ryan (0-3); L Corbett (0-2); S McGrath, J Woodlock, Patrick Maher, N McGrath, S Bourke, (all 0-1)	Report	Alan McCrabbe 0-5 (0-5f), Conal Keaney, Paul Ryan (0-1f, 0-1 ’65) 0-2 each, Eamon Dillon, Liam Rushe (0-1f), Ryan O’Dwyer, Johnny McCaffrey, Danny Sutcliffe, David Treacy, David O’Callaghan 0-1 each

Semple Stadium
Attendance: 43,088
Referee: Brian Gavin (Offaly)
8 July 2017
17:00
Round 2

Tipperary	6-26 - 1-19	Dublin
S Callanan 3-11 (0-7f), J McGrath 2-2, J O’Dwyer, J Forde 0-4 each, M Breen 1-0, S O’Brien 0-2, P Maher, B Maher, D McCormack 0-1 each.	Report	D Treacy 0-11 (0-8f), C O’Sullivan 1-1, L Rushe, R O’Dwyer 0-2 each, C Crummey, D O’Callaghan, R McBride 0-1 each.

Semple Stadium, Thurles
Attendance: 33,181
Referee: A Kelly (Galway)
