= Jer Doheny =

Irish hurler (1874–1929)

Personal information
- Native name: Jer Ó Dúchonna (Irish)
- Nickname: Jer
- Born: 20 July 1874 Ballycallan, County Kilkenny, Ireland
- Died: 11 August 1929 (aged 55) Kilkenny, Ireland
- Height: 6 ft 0 in (183 cm)

Sport
- Sport: Hurling
- Position: Right corner-forward
Clubs
- Years: Club
- Tullaroan; Threecastles; Johnstown
Club titles
- Kilkenny titles: 10
Inter-county
- Years: County
- 1893-1905: Kilkenny
Inter-county titles
- Leinster titles: 8
- All-Irelands: 1

Jeremiah "Jer" Doheny (20 July 1874 – 11 August 1929) was an Irish hurler who played as a right corner-forward for the Kilkenny senior team. He was captain for Kilkenny's first All Ireland victory in 1904.

Born in Ballycallan, County Kilkenny, Doheny first played competitive hurling in his youth. He made his senior debut during the 1893 championship and became a regular player over the next decade. During that time Doheny won one All-Ireland medal and eight Leinster medals. He was an All-Ireland runner-up on four occasions.

At club level Doheny was a ten-time championship medallist with Tullaroan and Johnstown, while he also played with Threecastles.

Doheny retired from inter-county hurling during the 1905 championship.

In retirement, Doheny became involved in administrative affairs, serving as chairman of the Kilkenny County Board.

== Biography ==
Jer Doheny was born in Ballycallan, County Kilkenny in 1874. The son of John and Annie Doheny and the cousin of another great Kilkenny hurler, Pat 'Fox' Maher, he was educated locally and later, like many of his contemporaries, he worked as a farmer in nearby Tullaroan. Doheny was an all-round sportsperson who also played cricket in the early 1890s, however, he later concentrated on the game of hurling.

== Playing career ==
=== Club ===
Doheny played his club hurling with the famous Tullaroan club in Kilkenny and enjoyed much success over the course of two decades. He won his first county senior championship winners’ medal with the club in 1895 as Tullaroan defeated Thresscastles. Two years later in 1897 Doheny added a second county title to his collection when Mooncoin were trounced in the final. After surrendering the title again in 1898 Tullaroan were back the following year. A 3-6 to 1-5 victory in the county final gave Doheny a third county title. The early years of the new century saw Tullaroan continue their dominance of the county championship. Doheny was a key player as the club annexed back-to-back county titles in 1901 and 1902. After their three-in-a-row bid faltered Tullaroan were back in 1904, with Doheny picking up a sixth county winners’ medal. Defeat in the next two county finals was followed by success in 1907. It was Doheny’s seventh championship victory with his club. He finished off his club career by winning back-to-back county champions winners’ medals in 1910 and 1911. Doheny also won a county final with the Threecastles club, bringing his tally of county championship winners’ medals to ten.

=== Inter-county ===
Doheny made his senior debut with Kilkenny during the 1893 championship campaign. He won his first Leinster medal that year as Kilkenny were granted a walkover by Dublin. On 22 June 1894 Kilkenny faced Cork for the very first time in an All-Ireland decider. After the original venue was unplayable the goalposts were uprooted and spectators and players alike moved to the Phoenix Park after a long delay. Cork, represented by Blackrock, gave an exhibition of hurling and led by 3-4 to 0-1 at the interval. Each side made exactly the same return in the second-half to give Cork a 6-9 to 0-2 victory.

After surrendering their provincial crown in 1894, Doheny collected a second Leinster medal the following year as Dublin were defeated by 1-5 to 0-5. Tipperary, represented by Tubberadora, faced Kilkenny in the delayed All-Ireland decider on 16 March 1896. In the first decider to take place at what would later be called Croke Park, Tipperary tore into Kilkenny. Paddy Riordan is said to have scored all but one point of Tipp's total. Mick Coogan captured Kilkenny's 1904 score of the game, as Tipperary claimed a massive 6-8 to 1-0 victory.

Doheny tcollected a third Leinster medal in 1897, as Kilkenny claimed the provincial title after receiving a walkover from Wexford. On 20 November 1898 Kilkenny faced Limerick in the All-Ireland decider, as both sides were hoping to win the title for the first time. "The Cats" got off to a great start and led by 2-4 to 1-1 at half-time. Limerick, however, powered on in the second-half and used their new technique of hooking. They got two quick goals early in the half and scored the winning goal from a free after 52 minutes. At the final whistle Limerick emerged victorious by 3-4 to 2-4.

Kilkenny retained the provincial title for the first time in their history in 1898. A 4-12 to 3-2 defeat of Dublin gave Doheny a fourth Leinster medal. On 25 March 1900 Kilkenny once again faced Tipperary in an All-Ireland final. "The Cats" dominated for the opening twenty-three minutes, however, controversy reigned over hand-passed scores which were awarded to Kilkenny in spite of being illegal at the time. Mikey Maher of Tipperary scored a second-half hat-trick to help Tipperary to a huge 7-13 to 3-10 victory.

Doheny won a fifth Leinster medal in 1900 as Kilkenny narrowly defeated Dublin by 4-11 to 4-10.

In 1903 Doheny picked up a sixth Leinster medal. The game against Dublin ended in a 1-5 apiece draw, however, Kilkenny were subsequently awarded the title by the Leinster Council. Doheny's side later trounced Antrim before lining out against Cork in the All-Ireland home final which wasn't played until 11 July 1905. Cork's Andy "Dooric" Buckley scored at least six goals as Kilkenny were humiliated by 8-9 to 0-8.

Doheny, who was captain of the team, added a seventh Leinster medal to his collection in 1904 as Kilkenny recorded a 2-8 to 2-6 defeat of Dublin in the provincial decider. The subsequent All-Ireland final was delayed until 24 June 1906, with three-in-a-row hopefuls Cork providing the opposition. It was the beginning of a hugely successful era for "the Cats" as Cork were heading into decline. A first half goal by Dick Doyle put Kilkenny in the driving seat, while "Fox" Maher made a great save in the dying moments of the game to help Kilkenny to a 1-9 to 1-8 victory. It was Doheny's and Kilkenny's first All-Ireland triumph.

In 1905 Doheny won an eighth and final Leinster medal as Dublin were once again bested by 2-8 to 2-2.

== Post-playing career ==
Shortly after his retirement from inter-county hurling Doheny became involved in the administrative affairs of the GAA. He served as chairman of the Kilkenny County Board from 1908 until 1912 and remained active in GAA affairs for the rst of his life.

Doheny married Annie Keoghan in 1913. She was a sister of Jack Keoghan, a winner of five All-Ireland medals with Kilkenny in 1907, 1909, 1911, 1912 and 1913. Their son, Jer Doheny Jr. (1919–2005), played hurling for a brief period with Erin's Own in Waterford. He won a county senior championship winners' medal with the club in 1942, before lining out with Waterford in the Munster final of 1943.

Jer Doheny died in 1929 aged fifty-five.

== Sources ==
- Corry, Eoghan, The GAA Book of Lists (Hodder Headline Ireland, 2005).
- Fullam, Brendan, Captains of the Ash (Wolfhound Press, 2002).

Sporting positions
Preceded by	Kilkenny Senior Hurling Captain; 1902	Succeeded by Mick Dalton
Preceded by Mick Dalton	Kilkenny Senior Hurling Captain; 1904	Succeeded by D.J. Stapleton
Preceded by Denis J. Gorey	Chairman of the Kilkenny County Board; 1908-1912	Succeeded by Denis J. Gorey
Achievements
Preceded by Steva Riordan (Cork)	All-Ireland Senior Hurling Final winning captain 1904	Succeeded by D.J. Stapleton (Kilkenny)
