= 2008 Munster Senior Hurling Championship final =

- Event: 2008 Munster Senior Hurling Championship
Tipperary	Clare
2-21	0-19
- Date: 13 July 2008
- Venue: Gaelic Grounds, Limerick
- Man of the Match: John O'Brien (Tipperary)
- Referee: John Sexton (Cork)
- Attendance: 48,076

The 2008 Munster Senior Hurling Championship final was a hurling match played on 13 July 2008 in the Gaelic Grounds, Limerick. It was contested by Tipperary and Clare. Tipperary claimed their first Munster Senior Hurling title since 2001 and 37th title overall, as they overcame Clare by a score of 2–21 to 0–19.

The match was screened live by RTÉ as part of The Sunday Game programme.

By winning the final Tipperary maintained their unbeaten run in 2008, under Liam Sheedy in his first year as manager.

== Match ==
=== Summary ===
Goals in either half from Séamus Callinan (1-3) and John O'Brien (1-4) helped the National League champions to an eight-point win.

With a first-half wides tally of 10, Clare struggled initially in defence and attack and were 1–11 to 0-6 behind at half-time. Aided by Niall Gilligan's 0-8 haul, Clare revived their chances by closing the gap to five points, but O'Brien's 58th-minute goal sealed the issue.

Playing captain Eoin Kelly and team captain Paul Ormonde collected the Munster Cup after the final whistle.

=== Details ===
13 July 2008

Tipperary	2-21 - 0-19	Clare
J O'Brien 1-4; S Callanan 1-3; E Kelly 0-6 (2f); S McGrath 0-3; L Corbett 0-2; J Woodlock 0-1; P Kerwick 0-1; H Maloney 0-1	(Report)	N Gilligan 0-8 (5f); M Flaherty 0-3 (3f); C Lynch 0-3; T Carmody 0-2; J Clancy 0-1; G Quinn 0-1; D McMahon 0-01

Gaelic Grounds, Limerick
Attendance: 48,076
Referee: D. Kirwan (Cork)

Tipperary	Clare

TIPPERARY GAA:
1	Brendan Cummins
2	Éamonn Buckley
3	Paul Curran
4	Conor O'Brien
5	Éamonn Corcoran
6	Conor O'Mahoney
7	Shane Maher
8	James Woodlock
9	Shane McGrath
10	Pat Kerwick
11	Séamus Callinan
12	John O'Brien
13	Eoin Kelly (c)
14	Lar Corbett
15	Séamus Butler
Substitutes Used:
16	Declan Fanning
17	Michéal Webster
18	Hugh Maloney
19	Benny Dunne
Manager:
Liam Sheedy

CLARE GAA:
1	Philip Brennan
2	Pat Vaughan
3	Frank Lohan
4	Gerry O'Grady
5	Gerry Quinn
6	Conor Plunkett
7	Philip Donnellan
8	Brian O'Connell (c)
9	Colin Lynch
10	Tony Carmody
11	Diarmuid McMahon
12	Jonathan Clancy
13	Tony Griffin
14	Niall Gilligan
15	Mark Flaherty
Substitutes Used:
16	Declan O'Rourke
17	Gary O'Connell
18	Fergal Lynch
19	Barry Nugent
20	M Murphy
Manager:
Mike McNamara

RTÉ Man of the Match:
John O'Brien
