= Tim Gleeson =

Irish hurler

Personal information
- Native name: Tadhg Ó Gliasáin (Irish)
- Born: 1881 Clogher, County Tipperary, Ireland
- Died: Unknown
- Occupation: National school teacher

Sport
- Sport: Hurling
Clubs
- Years: Club
- Clonoulty–Rossmore; Holycross–Ballycahill
Club titles
- Tipperary titles: 0
Inter-county
- Years: County
- 1905-1913: Tipperary
Inter-county titles
- Munster titles: 3
- All-Irelands: 2

Timothy Gleeson (born 1881) was an Irish hurler who played for the Tipperary senior team.

Gleeson joined the team during the 1905 championship and was a regular member of the starting fifteen until his retirement after the 1913 championship. During that time he won two All-Ireland medals and three Munster medals.

At club level Gleeson enjoyed a lengthy career with Clonoulty–Rossmore and Holycross–Ballycahill.

Sporting positions
Preceded by Tom Semple	Tipperary Senior Hurling Captain; 1910	Succeeded by Hugh Shelly
