= 1905 Kilkenny Senior Hurling Championship =

Annual hurling competition season

- Champions: Erin's Own (1st title); Mick Leahy (captain)
- Runners-up: Tullaroan; Jer Doheny (captain)

The 1905 Kilkenny Senior Hurling Championship was the 17th staging of the Kilkenny Senior Hurling Championship since its establishment by the Kilkenny County Board.

On 3 June 1906, Erin's Own won the championship after a 5–06 to 2–08 defeat of Tullaroan in the final. This was their first championship title.

== Results ==
=== Final ===
3 June 1906 Final	Erin's Own	5-06 - 2-08	Tullaroan	St. James's Park
