= Frank Lohan =

Irish hurler

Personal information
- Native name: Prionsias Ó Leocháin (Irish)
- Born: Shannon, County Clare, Ireland
- Height: 1.88 m (6 ft 2 in)

Sport
- Sport: Hurling
- Position: Left Corner Back
Clubs
- Years: Club
- Wolfe Tones na Sionna; Oranmore-Maree
Club titles
- Clare titles: 2
- Munster titles: 1
Inter-county
Years	County	Apps (scores)
1995-2008	Clare	58 (0-5)
Inter-county titles
- Munster titles: 3
- All-Irelands: 2
- NHL: 0
- All Stars: 1

Frank Lohan (born 1974 in Shannon, County Clare) is an Irish sportsperson. He plays hurling with his adopted club Oranmore/Maree, on the outskirts of Galway city, and was a member of the Clare senior inter-county team from 1995 until 2008.

== Playing career ==
Frank Lohan won his first Munster Senior Hurling Championship in 1995, as Clare defeated Limerick 1-17 to 0-11 in the final. The team then went on to win the All-Ireland Senior Hurling Championship, a victory that made Lohan and his teammates heroes in County Clare - it was the county team's first All-Ireland senior win since 1914.

Clare won the Munster and All-Ireland championships again in 1997, and Lohan received his third Munster medal when they retained their provincial title the following year. In 1999, Frank Lohan's performances were recognised with an All-Star award, being selected at corner-back.

Frank Lohan was Clare's starting number 4 for more than a decade, playing alongside his brother Brian Lohan in the full-back line. However, Brian retired after the 2006 season, and Frank moved to fill the vacant number three jersey during Clare's run to the 2007 All-Ireland quarter-final. He was also the Clare captain that season, as his father Gus and brother Brian had been before him. Frank Lohan announced his retirement from inter-county hurling in 2008. He retired as the most capped outfield player in Clare hurling history having played 58 senior championship matches (goalkeeper Davy Fitzgerald played 60), as well as the third most capped of all time (one ahead of DJ Carey and seven behind Christy Ring.

Frank Lohan also played Gaelic football for Clare and appeared in their 1996 Munster Football Final defeat to Kerry, scoring a point from play in the process.

Sporting positions
Preceded by Seánie McMahon	Clare Senior Hurling Captain; 2007	Succeeded by Brian O'Connell
