= Seánie McMahon =

Irish hurler

Personal information
- Native name: Seán Mac Mathúna (Irish)
- Nickname: Seánie
- Born: 1973 (age 52–53) Ennis, County Clare, Ireland
- Occupation: Engineer
- Height: 6 ft 2 in (188 cm)

Sport
- Sport: Hurling
- Position: Centre-back
Club
- Years: Club
- St Joseph's Doora-Barefield
Club titles
- Clare titles: 3
- Munster titles: 2
- All-Ireland Titles: 1
Inter-county
Years	County	Apps (scores)
1994-2006	Clare	51 (0-97)
Inter-county titles
- Munster titles: 3
- All-Irelands: 2
- NHL: 0
- All Stars: 3

Seánie McMahon (born 1973) is a former Irish hurler. He played with his local club St Joseph's Doora-Barefield and with the Clare senior inter-county team from 1994 until 2006. He is the highest scoring back in All-Ireland Championship history with 0-97 from 51 games.

== Playing career ==
=== Club ===
McMahon retired from playing with his club Doora-Barefield in 2009. He has had some success at underage levels before finally winning a senior county championship title in 1998. This was later converted into a Munster club title and on Saint Patrick's Day, 1999 McMahon claimed an All-Ireland club title following a huge win over Rathnure. Later that year he won a second county title as well as a second Munster club title. McMahon won a third Clare SHC medal in 2001.

=== Inter-county ===
McMahon is regarded by many as one of the finest hurlers to have ever played for Clare. He made his championship debut in 1994 against Tipperary and was a prominent member of the Clare side that won the Munster Championship and All-Ireland titles in 1995. Two years later in 1997 the team repeated the same feat, with McMahon claiming his second Munster and All-Ireland medals, this was followed by a third Munster medal in 1998. He played at centre half back, and along with Anthony Daly and Liam Doyle, formed one of the most formidable half backlines of the 1990s. McMahon was a stylish, skillful and powerful hurler but was also invaluable for his prowess with long distance frees, rarely finishing a game without his name on the scoresheet. He scored the first points for Clare in both the 1995 and 1997 All-Ireland finals. McMahon captained Clare to two successive All-Ireland semi finals in 2005 and 2006, losing to eventual winners Cork and Kilkenny respectively. On 6 October 2006, at 34 years of age, McMahon announced his retirement from inter-county hurling.

McMahon was selected at Centre half back on the Clare Intermediate team to play Cork in Semple Stadium on 21 June 2009.

== Honours ==
=== Team ===
St Joseph's Doora-Barefield

- All-Ireland Senior Club Hurling Championship (1): 1999
- Munster Senior Club Hurling Championship (2): 1998, 1999
- Clare Senior Club Hurling Championship (3): 1998, 1999, 2001

Clare

- All-Ireland Senior Hurling Championship (2): 1995, 1997
- Munster Senior Hurling Championship (3): 1995, 1997, 1998

Individual

- All-Stars (3): 1995, 1997, 1998
- Texaco Hurler of the Year (1): 1995
- All-Ireland Senior Hurling Championship Final Man of the Match (1): 1995
- Munster Hurling Team of the Last 25 Years (1984–2009)
- In May 2020, the Irish Independent named McMahon at number nine in its "Top 20 hurlers in Ireland over the past 50 years".

Preceded by Brian Whelahan (Offaly)	Texaco Hurler of the Year; 1995	Succeeded by Larry O'Gorman (Wexford)
Preceded by Brian Lohan	Clare Senior Hurling Captain; 2003-2006	Succeeded by Frank Lohan
