= List of Clare senior hurling team captains =

This article lists players who have recently captained the Clare county hurling team in the All-Ireland Senior Hurling Championship. Unlike other counties the captain is not chosen from the club that has won the Clare Senior Hurling Championship.

== List of captains ==
Year	Player	Club	National titles	Provincial titles
2026	Tony Kelly	Ballyea		
2024	Tony Kelly	Ballyea		
2018	Patrick O'Connor	Tubber		
2017	Patrick O'Connor	Tubber		
2016	Pat Donnellan	O'Callaghan's Mills		Munster Senior Hurling League
2015	Pat Donnellan	O'Callaghan's Mills		
2014	Pat Donnellan	O'Callaghan's Mills		
2013	Pat Donnellan	O'Callaghan's Mills	All-Ireland Hurling Final winning captain	
2012	Pat Donnellan	O'Callaghan's Mills		
2011	Pat Vaughan	Crusheen		
2010	Brian O'Connell	Wolfe Tones na Sionna		
2009	Brian O'Connell	Wolfe Tones na Sionna		
2008	Brian O'Connell	Wolfe Tones na Sionna		
2007	Frank Lohan	Wolfe Tones na Sionna		
2006	Seánie McMahon	St. Joseph's Doora-Barefield		
2005	Seánie McMahon	St. Joseph's Doora-Barefield		
2004	Seánie McMahon	St. Joseph's Doora-Barefield		
2003	Seánie McMahon	St. Joseph's Doora-Barefield		
2002	Brian Lohan	Wolfe Tones na Sionna		
2001	Brian Lohan	Wolfe Tones na Sionna		
2000	Brian Lohan	Wolfe Tones na Sionna		
1999	Anthony Daly	Clarecastle		
1998	Anthony Daly	Clarecastle		Munster Hurling Final winning captain
1997	Anthony Daly	Clarecastle	All-Ireland Hurling Final winning captain	Munster Hurling Final winning captain
1996	Anthony Daly	Clarecastle		
1995	Anthony Daly	Clarecastle	All-Ireland Hurling Final winning captain	Munster Hurling Final winning captain
1994	Anthony Daly	Clarecastle		
1993	Anthony Daly	Clarecastle		
1992	Tommy Guilfoyle	Feakle		
1991	John O'Connell	Sixmilebridge		
1990	Gerry McInerney	Sixmilebridge		
1989	Gerry McInerney	Sixmilebridge		
1988	James Shanahan	Broadford		
1987	John Callinan	Clarecastle		
1986	Tommy Keane	Kilmaley		
1985	Seán Stack	Sixmilebridge		
1984	Ger Loughnane	Feakle		
1983	John Minogue	Scariff		
1982	John Callinan	Clarecastle		
1981	Séamus Durack	Éire Óg		
1980	Noel Casey	Sixmilebridge		
