= Pat Vaughan =

Irish hurler

Personal information
- Native name: Pádraig Ó Macháin (Irish)
- Born: Crusheen, County Clare, Ireland
- Height: 6 ft 0 in (183 cm)

Sport
- Sport: Hurling
- Position: Right corner-back
Club
- Years: Club
- 2000s-present: Crusheen
Club titles
- Clare titles: 1
Inter-county
Years	County	Apps (scores)
2006-present	Clare	12 (1-4)
Inter-county titles
- Munster titles: 0
- All-Irelands: 0
- NHL: 0
- All Stars: 0

Pat Vaughan is an Irish sportsperson. He plays hurling with his local club Crusheen and has been a member of the Clare senior inter-county team since 2006. He was captain for 2011.

== Playing career ==
Vaughan was selected as captain of the Clare team for 2011.

A hip injury saw him out of action for most of the 202 season.

Sporting positions
Preceded by Brian O'Connell	Clare Senior Hurling Captain; 2011	Succeeded by Incumbent
