= Hugh Shelly =

Irish hurler (1883–1957)

Personal information
- Native name: Aodh Ó Sealbhaigh (Irish)
- Born: 21 November 1883 Thurles, County Tipperary, Ireland
- Died: 11 May 1957 (aged 73) Thurles, County Tipperary, Ireland
- Occupation: Shopkeeper

Sport
- Sport: Hurling
Club
- Years: Club
- Thurles Sarsfield's
Club titles
- Tipperary titles: 6
Inter-county
- Years: County
- 1906-1923: Tipperary
Inter-county titles
- Munster titles: 6
- All-Irelands: 3

Hugh Shelly (21 November 1883 – 11 May 1957) was an Irish hurler. His championship career with the Tipperary senior team spanned seventeen years from 1906 until 1923.

Born in Thurles, County Tipperary, Shelly first played competitive hurling with the Thurles Sarsfields club. He established himself on the senior team and won six county senior championship medals between 1904 and 1911.

Shelly first came to prominence on the inter-county scene at the age of 23 when he was selected for the Tipperary senior team. He made his debut during the 1906 championship and quickly became a regular member of the team. In an inter-county career that spanned three decades, Shelly won three All-Ireland medals, beginning with a victory in his debut season in 1906, a second championship title in 1908, and a third and final winners' medal in 1916. He also won six Munster medals. Shelly played his last game for Tipperary during the 1923 championship.

== Honours ==
Thurles Sarsfields

- Tipperary Senior Hurling Championship (6): 1904, 1906, 1907, 1908, 1909, 1911

Tipperary

- All-Ireland Senior Hurling Championship (3): 1906, 1908, 1916
- Munster Senior Hurling Championship (6): 1906, 1908, 1909, 1913, 1916, 1917

Sporting positions
Preceded by Tim Gleeson	Tipperary Senior Hurling Captain; 1911-1912	Succeeded by Patrick Meagher
