= 2008 Munster Senior Hurling Championship =

The 2008 Munster Senior Hurling Championship was an annual hurling competition played between 1 June and 13 July 2008 between five hurling counties from the province of Munster. The Munster final was played on 13 July 2008 in the Gaelic Grounds, Limerick, between Tipperary and Clare. Tipperary claimed their first Munster Senior Hurling title since 2001 and 37th title overall as they overcame Clare by a score of 2–21 to 0–19.

== Teams ==
- Clare GAA
- Cork
- Limerick
- Tipperary
- Waterford

== Results ==
June 1
1st Round

Waterford	0-23 - 2-26	Clare
D Bennett 0-10 (9f), J Mullane 0-8, G Hurney, S Molumphy, S Prendergast, E McGrath, D Coffey 0-1 each.	Report	M Flaherty 1-7 (3f, 2 '65'), N Gilligan 1-2, T Griffin 0-5, C Plunkett 0-3 (2f), D McMahon 0-3, C Lynch, T Carmody 0-2 each, P Vaughan, B Bugler 0-1 each.

Gaelic Grounds, Limerick
Referee: D Murphy (Wexford)

June 8
Semi-final

Cork	1-13 - 1-19	Tipperary
B O'Connor 1-3 (2f), C Naughton 0-4, J O'Connor 0-2, S Óg Ó hAilpín, P O'Sullivan, T Kenny, B Corry 0-1 each.	Report	E Kelly 1-7 (5f), L Corbett 0-4, S Callinan 0-3, E Corcoran (sl), W Ryan, S McGrath, P Kerwick, M Webster 0-1 each.

Páirc Uí Chaoimh, Cork
Referee: B Kelly (Westmeath)

June 22
Semi-final

Clare	4-12 - 1-16	Limerick
J Clancy 1-2, B Nugent 1-1, P Vaughan, D McMahon 1-0 each, M Flattery (3f), N Gilligan (2f) 0-3 each, T Carmody 0-2, C Lynch 0-1.	Report	A O’Shaughnessy 0-6 (5f), N Moran 0-5, O Moran 1-1, D Reale, D O'Grady, M O'Brien, D Ryan 0-1 each.

Semple Stadium, Thurles
Referee: E Morris (Dublin)

July 13
Final

Tipperary	2-21 - 0-19	Clare
J O'Brien 1-4, S Callinan 1-3, E Kelly 0-6 (2f), S McGrath 0-3, L Corbett 0-2, J Woodlock, P Kerwick, H Maloney 0-1 each.	Report	N Gilligan 0-8 (5f), M Flaherty (3f), C Lynch 0-3 each, T Carmody 0-2, J Clancy, G Quinn, D McMahon 0-1 each.

Gaelic Grounds, Limerick
Referee: D Kirwan (Cork)

== See also ==
- All-Ireland Senior Hurling Championship 2008

Preceded by Munster Senior Hurling Championship; 2007	Munster Senior Hurling Championship; 2008	Succeeded by Munster Senior Hurling Championship; 2009
