= 1906 All-Ireland Senior Hurling Championship final =

1906 All-Ireland Senior Hurling Final
- Event: 1906 All-Ireland Senior Hurling Championship
Tipperary	Dublin
3-16	3-8
- Date: 27 October 1907
- Venue: Nowlan Park, Kilkenny
- Referee: Tom Irwin (Cork)
- Attendance: 5,000

The 1906 All-Ireland Senior Hurling Championship Final was the 19th All-Ireland Final and the culmination of the 1906 All-Ireland Senior Hurling Championship, an inter-county hurling tournament for the top teams in Ireland. The match was held at Nowlan Park, Kilkenny, on 27 October 1907 between Dublin, represented by club side Faughs, and Tipperary, represented by club side Thurles. The Leinster champions lost to their Munster opponents on a score line of 3–16 to 3–8. Tipperary extended their unbeaten record in All Ireland Finals to seven wins out of seven.

== Match details ==
1907-10-27

Tipperary	3-16 – 3-8	Dublin

Nowlan Park, Kilkenny
Attendance: 5,000
Referee: T. Irwin (Cork)
