= Brian O'Connell (hurler) =

Irish hurler and footballer

Personal information
- Native name: Brian Ó Conaill (Irish)
- Nickname: BOC
- Born: 17 February 1984 (age 42) Shannon, County Clare, Ireland
- Occupation: Carpenter

Sport
- Sport: Hurling
- Position: Right wing-back
Club
- Years: Club
- Wolfe Tones
Club titles
- Clare titles: 1
Inter-county
- Years: County
- 2003-2010; 2012-2013: Clare
Inter-county titles
- Munster titles: 0
- All-Irelands: 0
- NHL: 0
- All Stars: 0

Brian O'Connell (born 17 February 1984) is an Irish former hurler and manager. At club level he played with Wolfe Tones, and also lined out at inter-county level with various Clare teams. O'Connell has been the Clare minor hurling team manager since 2021.

== Playing career ==
Born in Shannon, County Clare, O'Connell first played hurling at juvenile and underage levels with the Wolfe Tones club. He eventually progressed to adult level and won a Clare SHC medal after a defeat of Newmarket-on-Fergus in 2006.

O'Connell first appeared on the inter-county scene with Clare as a member of the minor team in 2002. He later spent three consecutive seasons with the under-21 team. O'Connell was drafted onto the senior team in 2003 and served as captain for three consecutive seasons, including during Clare's 2008 Munster final defeat by Tipperary.

O'Connell, who worked as a carpenter, emigrated to Australia in 2010, citing a lack of work in Ireland. He was one of the first high-profile hurlers to leave due to work commitments. O'Connell returned home in 2012 and immediately re-joined the Clare team. A series of ongoing injuries forced him to leave the panel in early 2013.

== Management career ==
O'Connell began his coaching career at club level as a selector with the Wolfe Tones senior team. He was appointed manager of the Clare minor team in December 2021, having spent two years working with the group of players at academy level. O'Connell guided the team to the Munster MHC title and All-Ireland MHC title in 2023.

== Honours ==
=== Player ===
Wolfe Tones

- Clare Senior Hurling Championship: 2006

Clare

- Waterford Crystal Cup: 2009, 2013

=== Manager ===
Clare

- All-Ireland Minor Hurling Championship: 2023
- Munster Minor Hurling Championship: 2023

Sporting positions
Preceded by Frank Lohan	Clare senior hurling team captain 2008-2010	Succeeded by Pat Vaughan
