= D.J. Stapleton =

Irish hurler (1886–1968)

D. J. Stapleton
Personal information
- Native name: D. S. Mac an Ghaill (Irish)
- Born: Daniel John Stapleton; 14 May 1886 Callan, County Kilkenny, Ireland
- Died: 21 September 1968 (aged 82) Skerries, County Dublin, Ireland
- Occupation: Garda superintendent

Sport
- Sport: Hurling
- Position: Forward
Club
- Years: Club
- Erin's Own
Club titles
- Kilkenny titles: 1
Inter-county
- Years: County
- 1904-1907: Kilkenny
Inter-county titles
- Leinster titles: 3
- All-Irelands: 3

Daniel John Stapleton (14 May 1886 – 21 September 1968) was an Irish hurler. His championship career with the Kilkenny senior team lasted four seasons from 1904 until 1907, during which time he captained the team to the 1905 All-Ireland Championship.

Born outside Callan, County Kilkenny, Stapleton first played competitive hurling with Callan CBS. He later joined the Erin's Own club in Kilkenny, with whom he won a county championship medal in 1905.

Stapleton made his debut on the inter-county scene during the 1904 championship. Over the course of the following four seasons he won three All-Ireland medals as well as three Leinster medals. Stapleton also featured prominently on the Kilkenny teams that won the Railway Shield outright after three successive victories.

In his private life Stapleton qualified as a chemist and opened a business in Kilkenny . An active member of the Irish Republican Army during the War of Independence, he later supported the Anglo-Irish Treaty and joined the National Army. Stapleton joined the Garda Síochána in 1932 and rose through the ranks to become head of the Technical Branch as well as the official State ballistics expert.

== Honours ==
Erin's Own

- Kilkenny Senior Hurling Championship (1): 1905

Kilkenny

- All-Ireland Senior Hurling Championship (3): 1904, 1905, 1907
- Leinster Senior Hurling Championship (3): 1904, 1905, 1907

Sporting positions
Preceded by Jer Doheny	Kilkenny Senior Hurling Captain; 1905	Succeeded by Dick Walsh
Achievements
Preceded by Jer Doheny	All-Ireland Senior Hurling Final winning captain 1905	Succeeded by Tom Semple
