= Paddy Riordan =

Irish hurler

Personal information
- Native name: Pádraig Ó Riordán (Irish)
- Born: 31 August 1871 Drombane, County Tipperary, Ireland
- Died: March 1941 (aged 69) Long Island, New York City, United States
- Occupation: Labourer

Sport
- Sport: Hurling
- Position: Left corner-forward
Clubs
- Years: Club
- Drombane; Upperchurch–Drombane; Thurles
Club titles
- Tipperary titles: 3
Inter-county
- Years: County
- 1894-1907: Tipperary
Inter-county titles
- Munster titles: 2
- All-Irelands: 2

Patrick J. Riordan (31 August 1871 - March 1941) was an Irish hurler who played as a forward for the Tipperary senior team.

Born in Drombane, County Tipperary, Riordan first arrived on the inter-county scene at the age of twenty-three when he first linked up with the Tipperary senior team. He made his debut during the 1894 championship. Riordan went on to play a key part for Tipperary, and won two All-Ireland medals and two Munster medals.

At club level Riordan was a three-time championship medallist. He began his club career with Drombane before later joining Upperchurch–Drombane and Thurles.

Riordan retired from inter-county hurling following the conclusion of the 1907 championship.

== Honours ==
=== Team ===
Drombane

- Tipperary Senior Hurling Championship (1): 1894

Thurles

- Tipperary Senior Hurling Championship (2): 1906, 1907

Tipperary

- All-Ireland Senior Hurling Championship (2): 1895, 1906
- Munster Senior Hurling Championship (2): 1895, 1906
