= 1906 All-Ireland Senior Hurling Championship =

All-Ireland champions
- Winning team: Tipperary (7th win)
- Captain: Tom Semple

All-Ireland Finalists
- Losing team: Dublin
- Captain: Danny McCormack

Provincial champions
- Munster: Tipperary
- Leinster: Dublin
- Ulster: Donegal
- Connacht: Galway

Championship statistics
- All-Star Team: See here

The All-Ireland Senior Hurling Championship 1906 was the 20th series of the All-Ireland Senior Hurling Championship, Ireland's premier hurling knock-out competition. Tipperary won the championship, beating Dublin 3–16 to 3–8 in the final.

== Format ==
All-Ireland Championship

Quarter-final: (1 match) This is a lone match between the Leinster and Ulster representatives. One team is eliminated at this stage while the winners advance to the semi-finals.

Semi-finals: (2 matches) The winners of the lone quarter-final join the Munster and Connacht representatives and London, who receive a bye to this stage of the championship, to make up the semi-final pairings. Two teams are eliminated at this stage while the two winning teams advance to the All-Ireland final.

Final: (1 match) The winners of the two semi-finals contest this game with the winners being declared All-Ireland champions.

== Results ==
=== Connacht Senior Hurling Championship ===
26 May 1907
Final

Galway	w/o – scr.	Sligo

Tuam

=== Leinster Senior Hurling Championship ===
14 July 1907
Final

Dublin	1–14 – 0–5	Kilkenny

Wexford

=== Munster Senior Hurling Championship ===
Final

Tipperary	3-4– 0–9	Cork

=== Ulster Senior Hurling Championship ===
14 July 1906
Final

Donegal	5–21 – 0–1	Antrim

attendance = 3,000

=== All-Ireland Senior Hurling Championship ===
19 May 1907
Quarter-final

Kilkenny	7–21 – 1–3	Donegal

Belfast

4 August 1907
Semi-final

Dublin	4–10 – 2–2	London

Wexford Park, Wexford

8 September 1907
Semi-final

Tipperary	7–14 – 0–2	Galway

Markets Field, Limerick

27 October 1907
Final

Tipperary	3–16 – 3–8	Dublin

Kilkenny

== Sources ==
- Corry, Eoghan, The GAA Book of Lists (Hodder Headline Ireland, 2005).
- Donegan, Des, The Complete Handbook of Gaelic Games (DBA Publications Limited, 2005).
