= Jack Rochford =

Kilkenny hurler (1882–1953)

Personal information
- Native name: Seán de Rochfort (Irish)
- Born: 24 April 1882 Threecastles, County Kilkenny, Ireland
- Died: 17 October 1953 (aged 71) Kilkenny, Ireland
- Occupation: Tailor
- Height: 6 ft 1 in (185 cm)

Sport
- Sport: Hurling
- Position: Full-back
Clubs
- Years: Club
- Threecastles; Tullaroan; Erin's Own
Club titles
- Kilkenny titles: 2
Inter-county*
Years	County	Apps (scores)
1902–1916	Kilkenny	41 (0–00)
Inter-county titles
- Leinster titles: 9
- All-Irelands: 7
- *Inter County team apps and scores correct as of 20:22, 12 November 2014.

John Rochford (24 April 1882 – 17 October 1953) was an Irish hurler who played as a full-back at senior level for the Kilkenny county team.

Born in Threecastles, County Kilkenny, Rochford first played competitive hurling and cricket in his youth. He arrived on the inter-county scene at the age of twenty when he first linked up with the Kilkenny senior team. He made his senior debut during the 1902 championship. Rochford immediately became a regular member of the starting fifteen, and won seven All-Ireland medals and nine Leinster medals.

As a member of the Leinster inter-provincial team on a number of occasions, Rochford won three Railway Shield medals. At club level he was a two-time championship medallist with Threecastles and Tullaroan. He also played with Erin's Own.

Throughout his career Rochford made 41 championship appearances. He retired from inter-county hurling during the 1916 championship.

In retirement from playing Rochford became involved in coaching. He was co-trainer of the Kilkenny team that won the All-Ireland title in 1922, a role he also played with the 1931 Leinster title-winning side.

Rochford is widely regarded as one of Kilkenny's all-time greatest players and as one of the greatest full-backs of all-time.

== Playing career ==
=== Club ===
Rochford began his club hurling career with Tullaroan in his late teenage years. By 1901 he had joined the Threecastles club and lined out in his first championship decider. A 5-10 to 3-7 was Rochford's lot on that occasion, ironically at the hands of Tullaroan.

Two years later in 1903 Rochford was back in the championship decider with Threecastles. A 2-10 to 0-5 defeat of Kilmanagh gave him his first championship medal.

After defeat by Mooncoin in the 1908 championship decider, Rochford joined the Erin's Own club before later rejoining Tullaroan.

In 1915 Rochford won his second and final championship medal following a 7-2 to 2-2 trouncing of Dicksboro.

=== Inter-county ===
==== Beginnings ====
Rochford made his debut with the Kilkenny senior team during the 1902 championship, however, their campaign ended in a single-point defeat by Dublin in the Leinster decider.

In 1903 Rochford picked up his first Leinster medal. The game against Dublin ended in a 1-5 apiece draw, however, Kilkenny were subsequently awarded the title by the Leinster Council. Rochford's side later trounced Antrim before lining out against Cork in the All-Ireland home final which wasn't played until 11 July 1905. Cork's Andy "Dooric" Buckley scored at least six goals as Kilkenny were humiliated by 8-9 to 0-8.

==== Early successes ====
Rochford added a second Leinster medal to his collection in 1904 as Kilkenny recorded a 2-8 to 2-6 defeat of Dublin in the provincial decider. The subsequent All-Ireland final was delayed until 24 June 1906, with three-in-a-row hopefuls Cork providing the opposition. It was the beginning of a hugely successful era for "the Cats" as Cork were heading into decline. A first half goal by Dick Doyle put Kilkenny in the driving seat, while goalkeeper Pat "Fox" Maher made a great save in the dying moments of the game to help Kilkenny to a 1-9 to 1-8 victory. It was Rochford's and Kilkenny's first All-Ireland triumph.

In 1905 Rochford won a third successive Leinster medal as Dublin were once again bested by 2-8 to 2-2. The subsequent All-Ireland final on 14 April 1907 saw Cork provide the opposition once again. The game was a high-scoring affair with Cork winning by 5-10 to 3-13. The game, however, had to be replayed as Cork goalkeeper Daniel McCarthy was a British army reservist and Kilkenny's Matt Gargan had earlier played with Waterford in the Munster championship. The replay was another high-scoring one, with Jimmy Kelly scoring 5-2 for Kilkenny. A puck-out by Cork's Jamesy Kelleher is said to have bounced and hopped over the Kilkenny crossbar. Kilkenny won the game by 7-7 to 2-9, with all seven of their goals coming in a thirty-minute spell. It was Rochford's second All-Ireland medal.

Kilkenny lost their provincial crown to Dublin in 1906 as the Tullaroan players withdrew from the team in a dispute over the selection policy, however, the team returned in 1907 with Rochford capturing a fourth Leinster medal following a 4-14 to 1-9 defeat of Dublin. On 21 June 1908 Kilkenny faced Cork in the All-Ireland decider for the third time in four years. A high-scoring, but close, game developed between these two great rivals once again. As the game entered the final stage there was little to separate the two sides. Jimmy Kelly scored three first-half goals while Jack Anthony scored Kilkenny's winning point at the death. Cork went on two late goal hunts, however, the final score of 3-12 to 4-8 gave Kilkenny the win. It was Rochford's third All-Ireland medal. The game became the benchmark by which all subsequent All-Ireland performances were judged.

Kilkenny surrendered their provincial and All-Ireland titles in 1908 by refusing to take part in the competition, however, the team returned in 1909. A 5-16 to 2-7 trouncing of Laois gave Rochford a fifth Leinster medal. The All-Ireland decider on 12 December 1909 pitted Kilkenny against Tipperary, a team that had never lost an All-Ireland final. Before the game itself there was internal fighting within the Kilkenny camp and a selection row left the team short of substitutes. In spite of this, the team still went on to win the game, courtesy of three goals by Bill Hennerby and a fourth by Jimmy Kelly. The 4-6 to 0-12 victory gave Rochford a fourth All-Ireland medal.

==== Three-in-a-row ====
It would be another two years before Rochford won his sixth Leinster medal. The 4-6 to 3-1 defeat of Dublin allowed 'the Cats' to advance to the All-Ireland series once again. Limerick provided the opposition in the subsequent All-Ireland final on 18 February 1912, however, the pitch at the Cork Athletic Grounds was water-logged and the game was refixed for Thurles on 12 May 1912. Limerick were unable to attend the replay and Rochford's fifth All-Ireland title was awarded to him rather than being won on the field of play. Kilkenny later defeated Tipperary in an alternative to the final, however, Limerick later defeated Kilkenny in a challenge game.

Rochford won a seventh Leinster medal in 1912 following a 6-6 to 2-4 defeat of Laois. Yet another All-Ireland final appearance beckoned, with Cork providing the opposition on 17 November 1912. The game was an extremely close affair with Sim Walton proving himself to be the goal-scoring hero. A speculative Matt Gargan shot also hopped past the goalkeeper to give Kilkenny a narrow 2-1 to 1-3 victory. It was Rochford's sixth All-Ireland medal.

In February 1913 Rochford wrote to the Kilkenny County Board intimating his desire to "resign" from the county team and citing his age as his primary reason for doing so. His letter was read at the subsequent meeting, however, it was treated as a "joke" and the "resignation" was rejected. As a result of this Rochford later went on to win his eighth Leinster title in ten years following a 7-5 to 2-1 victory in a replay against Dublin. The subsequent All-Ireland final on 2 November 1913 saw Kilkenny square up to Tipperary for the second time in five years in the first 15-a-side All-Ireland decider. Kilkenny led by 1-4 to 1-1 at half-time and eventually hung on to win on a score line of 2-4 to 1-2. This victory gave Rochford a record-breaking seventh All-Ireland medal, a record that he shared with fellow Kilkenny players Sim Walton, Dick "Drug" Walsh and Dick Doyle.

==== Decline ====
Three years later in 1916 Rochford won his ninth Leinster medal after an 11-3 to 2-2 trouncing of Wexford. An All-Ireland final date with Tipperary beckoned on 21 January 1917, however, he refused to play due to a disagreement over selection policy. Rochford is said to have thrown his hurley and togs into the River Liffey in disgust, as he brought his inter-county career to an end.

=== Inter-provincial ===
In 1905 Rochford was at full-back on the all-Kilkenny Leinster team that faced Connacht, represented by Galway, in the very first final Railway Shield final. A 4-10 to 4-5 victory gave him, and Leinster, a first Railway Shield medal.

Leinster failed to retain the title in 1906, however, they reached the decider again the following year. A 0-15 to 1-8 defeat of an all-Tipperary Munster team gave Rochford a second Railway Shield medal.

In 1908 Rochford was a key member of the defence as Leinster faced Munster in the decider once again. A 0-14 to 2-5 victory gave Rochford a third Railway Shield.

== Personal life ==
Born in Tulla, Threecastles, Rochford was the second of three children born to Michael Rochford (born 1852), a journeyman tailor, and Catherine "Kate" White (born 1845). After his primary education at Clinstown and Ballydaniel, Rochford followed in his father's footsteps by also becoming a tailor.

Rochford's work brought him to Dublin after his retirement from inter-county hurling. Here he met, and subsequently married, Catherine Gallagher (1883-1982), a teacher from Glenties, County Donegal. Four of their five children, Michael, Katherine (Kate), Christine and Carmel, were born in Dublin, while their youngest daughter, Marie, was born in Kilkenny after the family relocated there in the late 1920s.

Rochford died on 17 October 1953 after a short illness.

== Honours ==
=== Team ===
Threecastles

- Kilkenny Senior Hurling Championship (1): 1903

Tullaroan

- Kilkenny Senior Hurling Championship (1): 1915

Kilkenny

- All-Ireland Senior Hurling Championship (7): 1904, 1905, 1907, 1909, 1911, 1912, 1911
- Leinster Senior Hurling Championship (9): 1903, 1904, 1905, 1907, 1909, 1911, 1912, 1913, 1916

Leinster

- Railway Shield (3): 1905, 1907, 1908
