= Paddy Lanigan =

Irish hurler (1881–1945)

Paddy 'Icy' Lanigan
Personal information
- Native name: Pádraig Ó Lonagáin (Irish)
- Nickname: Icy
- Born: 1881 Tullogher, County Kilkenny, Ireland
- Died: 20 July 1945 (aged 64) Kilkenny, Ireland
- Occupation: Postman

Sport
- Sport: Hurling
- Position: Left corner-back
Club
- Years: Club
- 1899–1916: Erin's Own
Club titles
- Kilkenny titles: 2
Inter-county
- Years: County
- 1904–1914: Kilkenny
Inter-county titles
- Leinster titles: 6
- All-Irelands: 6

Patrick Joseph Lanigan (1881 – 20 July 1945) was an Irish hurler who played as a left corner-back for the Kilkenny senior team.

Born in Tullogher, Lanigan first arrived on the inter-county scene at the age of twenty-three when he first linked up with the Kilkenny senior team. He made his senior debut during the 1904 championship. Lanigan went on to become a regular member of the team over the next decade, and won six All-Ireland medals and six Leinster medals.

At club level Lanigan was a two-time championship medallist with Erin's Own.

Lanigan retired from inter-county hurling following the conclusion of the 1914 championship.

In retirement from playing Lanigan became involved in team management and coaching. He was a selector with the Kilkenny senior team that claimed Leinster and All-Ireland honours in 1922, before later training the James Stephens GAA club team.

== Playing career ==
=== Club ===
Lanigan joined the Erin's Own senior hurling team at the turn of the century and became a regular member of the team.

In 1905, Erin's Own qualified for the senior championship decider for the first time in their history. A 5–6 to 2–8 defeat of Tullaroan gave Lanigan his first Kilkenny Senior Hurling Championship medal.

Two-in-a-row proved beyond Erin's Own, however, the team qualified for final again in 1909. Mooncoin provided the opposition, however, a 1–12 to 1–7 victory gave Lanigan his second championship medal.

=== Inter-county ===
==== Early successes ====
Lanigan joined the Kilkenny senior team in 1904. He subsequently collected his first Leinster medal as Kilkenny recorded a 2–8 to 2–6 defeat of Dublin in the provincial decider. The subsequent All-Ireland final was delayed until 24 June 1906, with three-in-a-row hopefuls Cork providing the opposition. A first half goal by Dick Doyle put Kilkenny in the lead, while goalkeeper Pat "Fox" Maher made an important save in the dying moments of the game to help Kilkenny to a 1–9 to 1–8 victory. It was Lanigan's and Kilkenny's first All-Ireland win.

In 1905 Lanigan won a second successive Leinster medal as Dublin were once again beaten by 2–8 to 2–2. The subsequent All-Ireland final on 14 April 1907 saw Cork provide the opposition once again. The game was a high-scoring affair with Cork winning by 5–10 to 3–13. The game, however, had to be replayed as Cork goalkeeper Daniel McCarthy was a British army reservist and Kilkenny's Matt Gargan had earlier played with Waterford in the Munster championship. The replay was another high-scoring one, with Jimmy Kelly scoring 5–2 for Kilkenny. A puck-out by Cork's Jamesy Kelleher is said to have bounced and hopped over the Kilkenny crossbar. Kilkenny won the game by 7–7 to 2–9, with all seven of their goals coming in a thirty-minute spell. It was Lanigan's second All-Ireland medal.

Kilkenny lost their provincial crown to Dublin in 1906 as the Tullaroan players withdrew from the team in a dispute over the selection policy, however, the team returned in 1907 with Lanigan capturing a third Leinster medal following a 4–14 to 1–9 defeat of Dublin. On 21 June 1908 Kilkenny faced Cork in the All-Ireland decider for the third time in four years. Jimmy Kelly scored three first-half goals while Jack Anthony scored Kilkenny's winning point at the end. Cork went on two late goal hunts, however, the final score of 3–12 to 4–8 gave Kilkenny the win. It was Lanigan's third All-Ireland medal.

Kilkenny surrendered their provincial and All-Ireland titles in 1908 by refusing to take part in the competition, however, the team returned in 1909. A 5–16 to 2–7 win over Laois gave Lanigan a fourth Leinster medal. The All-Ireland decider on 12 December 1909 pitted Kilkenny against Tipperary, a team that had never lost an All-Ireland final. Before the game itself there was internal fighting within the Kilkenny camp and a selection row left the team short of substitutes. In spite of this, the team still went on to win the game, courtesy of three goals by Bill Hennerby and a fourth by Jimmy Kelly. The 4–6 to 0–12 victory gave Lanigan a fourth All-Ireland medal.

==== Three-in-a-row ====
It would be another two years before Lanigan won his fifth Leinster medal. The 4–6 to 3–1 defeat of Dublin allowed Kilkenny to advance to the All-Ireland series once again. Limerick provided the opposition in the subsequent All-Ireland final on 18 February 1912, however, the pitch at the Cork Athletic Grounds was water-logged and the game was refixed for Thurles on 12 May 1912. Limerick were unable to attend the replay and Lanigan's fifth All-Ireland title was awarded to him rather than being won on the field of play. Kilkenny later defeated Tipperary in an alternative to the final, however, Limerick later defeated Kilkenny in a challenge game.

Lanigan won a sixth Leinster medal in 1912 following a 6–6 to 2–4 defeat of Laois. Yet another All-Ireland final appearance beckoned, with Cork providing the opposition on 17 November 1912. Kilkenny won a narrow 2–1 to 1–3 victory. It was Lanigan's sixth All-Ireland medal.

Lanigan was dropped from the starting fifteen in 1913, however, he went on to collect another set of Leinster and All-Ireland medals as a non-playing substitute.

==== Retirement ====
Lanigan retired from inter-county hurling following Kilkenny's defeat by Laois in the 1914 Leinster decider.

== Coaching career ==
=== Inter-county ===
In 1922 Lanigan was a selector with the Kilkenny senior team. It was a season which saw the team claim the Leinster title for the first time in six years following a 3–4 to 1–2 defeat of Dublin. Under Lanigan's guidance the team later claimed the All-Ireland crown following a 4–2 to 2–6 defeat of Tipperary.

=== Club ===
Lanigan served as trainer of the James Stephens junior hurling team in 1924. A 5–5 to 1–0 defeat of Thomastown in a replay secured the Kilkenny Junior Hurling Championship.

== Honours ==
=== Player ===
Erin's Own

- Kilkenny Senior Hurling Championship (1): 1905, 1909

Kilkenny

- All-Ireland Senior Hurling Championship (7): 1904, 1905, 1907, 1909, 1911, 1912, 1913 (sub)
- Leinster Senior Hurling Championship (7): 1903, 1904, 1905, 1907, 1909, 1911, 1912, 1913 (sub)

=== Mentor ===
James Stephens

- Kilkenny Junior Hurling Championship (1): 1924

Kilkenny

- All-Ireland Senior Hurling Championship (1): 1922
- Leinster Senior Hurling Championship (1): 1922
