= Dan Grace =

Irish hurler (1885–1957)

Personal information
- Native name: Dónall de Grás (Irish)
- Born: 11 April 1885 Threecastles, County Kilkenny, Ireland
- Died: 31 May 1957 (aged 72) Kilkenny, Ireland
- Occupation: Roman Catholic priest

Sport
- Sport: Hurling
- Position: Midfield
Club
- Years: Club
- Threecastles
Club titles
- Kilkenny titles: 1
Inter-county
- Years: County
- 1903-1909: Kilkenny
Inter-county titles
- Leinster titles: 0
- All-Irelands: 3

Daniel Grace (11 April 1885 – 31 May 1957) was an Irish hurler who played in a variety of positions for the Kilkenny senior.

Born in Threecastles, County Kilkenny, Grace first arrived on the inter-county scene when he first linked up with the Kilkenny senior team. He made his senior debut during the 1903 championship. Grace immediately became a regular member of the starting fifteen, and won three All-Ireland medals.

At club level Grace was a one-time championship medallist with Threecastles.

He retired from inter-county hurling following the conclusion of the 1909 championship.

== Playing career ==
=== Club ===
Grace played his club hurling career with Threecastles and in 1903 he lined out in the championship decider. A 2-10 to 0-5 defeat of Kilmanagh gave him his sole championship medal.

=== Inter-county ===
==== Beginnings ====
Grace made his debut with the Kilkenny senior team during the 1903 championship, however. After missing the provincial campaign he was on the starting team for the subsequent All-Ireland decider against Cork on 11 July 1905. Cork's Andy "Dooric" Buckley scored at least six goals as Kilkenny were humiliated by 8-9 to 0-8.

The successful provincial campaign passed Grace by once again in 1904. The subsequent All-Ireland final was delayed until 24 June 1906, with three-in-a-row hopefuls Cork providing the opposition. It was the beginning of a hugely successful era for "the Cats" as Cork were heading into decline. A first half goal by Dick Doyle put Kilkenny in the driving seat, while goalkeeper Pat "Fox" Maher made a great save in the dying moments of the game to help Kilkenny to a 1-9 to 1-8 victory. It was Grace's and Kilkenny's first All-Ireland triumph.

In 1905 Grace missed Kilkenny's third successive Leinster triumph. The subsequent All-Ireland final on 14 April 1907 saw Cork provide the opposition once again. The game was a high-scoring affair with Cork winning by 5-10 to 3-13. The game, however, had to be replayed as Cork goalkeeper Daniel McCarthy was a British army reservist and Kilkenny's Matt Gargan had earlier played with Waterford in the Munster championship. The replay was another high-scoring one, with Jimmy Kelly scoring 5-2 for Kilkenny. A puck-out by Cork's Jamesy Kelleher is said to have bounced and hopped over the Kilkenny crossbar. Kilkenny won the game by 7-7 to 2-9, with all seven of their goals coming in a thirty-minute spell. It was Grace's second All-Ireland medal.

Kilkenny lost their provincial crown to Dublin in 1906 as the Tullaroan players withdrew from the team in a dispute over the selection policy, however, the team returned in 1907 with Grace lining out in the All-Ireland decider against Cork on 21 June 1908. A high-scoring, but close, game developed between these two great rivals once again. As the game entered the final stage there was little to separate the two sides. Jimmy Kelly scored three first-half goals while Jack Anthony scored Kilkenny's winning point at the death. Cork went on two late goal hunts, however, the final score of 3-12 to 4-8 gave Kilkenny the win. It was Grace's third All-Ireland medal. The game became the benchmark by which all subsequent All-Ireland performances were judged.

Kilkenny surrendered their provincial and All-Ireland titles in 1908 by refusing to take part in the competition, however, the team returned in 1909. Grace was a member of the extended panel that year, however, he was awarded a fourth All-Ireland medal as Kilkenny defeated Tipperary by 4-6 to 0-12 in the decider.

== Honours ==
=== Team ===
Threecastles

- Kilkenny Senior Hurling Championship (1): 1903

Kilkenny

- All-Ireland Senior Hurling Championship (4): 1904, 1905, 1907, 1909 (sub)
