= List of All-Ireland Senior Hurling Championship winning captains =

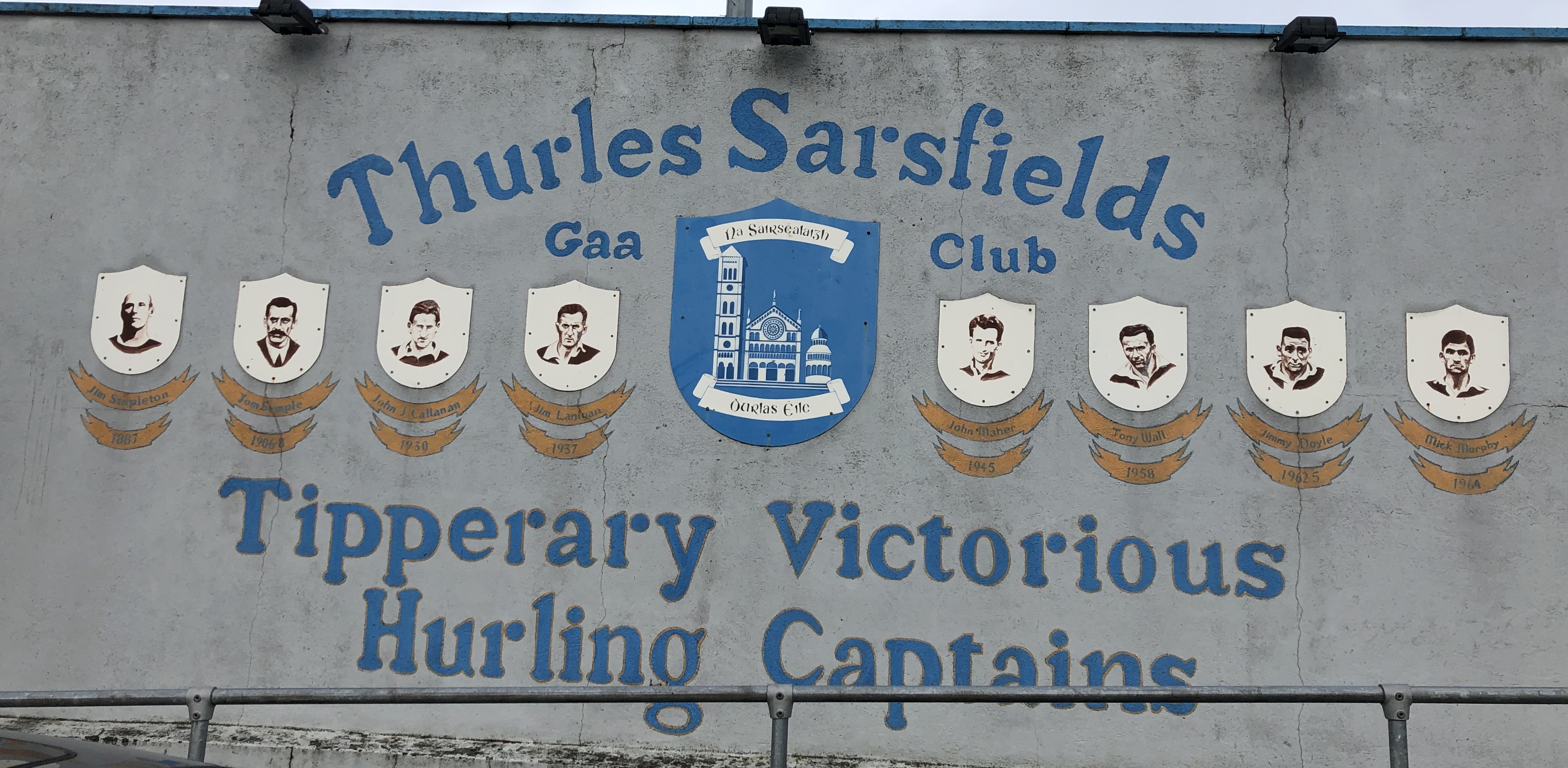
Mural at Thurles Sarsfields commemorating the eight club players who have captained Tipperary teams to All-Ireland titles.

This is the list of All-Ireland Senior Hurling Championship winning captains for the hurling sports competition in Ireland. Each team has one captain. In many counties the captain is chosen by the club that won the Senior County Hurling Championship in the previous year. In recent years, this practice is being replaced by the manager picking one of the more experienced players to take this role. The captain accepts the cup on behalf of the team and makes a speech in which he thanks all who helped in the success of the team.

== List of captains ==
Year	Player	County	Club	Ref
1887	Jim Stapleton	Tipperary	Thurles Sarsfields (1)	
1888	Competition not completed			
1889	Nicholas O'Shea	Dublin	Kickham's	
1890	Dan Lane	Cork	Aghabullogue	
1891	John Mahony	Kerry	Ballyduff	
1892	Bill O'Callaghan	Cork	Redmond's	
1893	John Murphy	Cork	Blackrock (1-2)	
1894	Stephen Hayes	Cork	Blackrock (1-2)	
1895	Mikey Maher (1)	Tipperary	Tubberadora (1-2)	
1896	Mikey Maher (2)	Tipperary	Tubberadora (1-2)	
1897	Denis Grimes	Limerick	Kilfinane	
1898	Mikey Maher (3)	Tipperary	Tubberadora (3)	
1899	Tim Condon	Tipperary	Horse and Jockey	
1900	Ned Hayes	Tipperary	Two-Mile-Borris	
1901	Jack Coughlan	London	Tulla (1)	
1902	Jamesy Kelleher	Cork	Dungourney	
1903	Stephen Riordan	Cork	Blackrock (3)	
1904	Jer Doheny	Kilkenny	Tullaroan (1)	
1905	D.J. Stapleton	Kilkenny	Erin's Own	
1906	Tom Semple (1)	Tipperary	Thurles Sarsfields (2)	
1907	Dick Walsh (1)	Kilkenny	Mooncoin (1)	
1908	Tom Semple (2)	Tipperary	Thurles Sarsfields (3)	
1909	Dick Walsh (2)	Kilkenny	Mooncoin (2)	
1910	Dick Doyle	Wexford	Castlebridge	
1911	Sim Walton (1)	Kilkenny	Tullaroan (2-3)	
1912	Sim Walton (2)	Kilkenny	Tullaroan (2-3)	
1913	Dick Walsh (3)	Kilkenny	Mooncoin (3)	
1914	Ambrose Power	Clare	Tulla (2)	
1915	Jack Finlay	Laois	Ballygeehan	
1916	Johnny Leahy (1)	Tipperary	Boherlahan (1)	
1917	John Ryan	Dublin	Collegians	
1918	Willie Hough	Limerick	NewcastleWest	
1919	Jimmy ‘Major’ Kennedy	Cork	Carrigtwohill	
1920	Bob Mockler	Dublin	Faughs	
1921	Bob McConkey	Limerick	Young Irelands	
1922	Wattie Dunphy	Kilkenny	Mooncoin (4)	
1923	Mick Kenny	Galway	Tynagh	
1924	Frank Wall	Dublin		
1925	Johnny Leahy (2)	Tipperary	Boherlahan (2)	
1926	Seán Óg Murphy (1)	Cork	Blackrock (4)	
1927	Mick Gill	Dublin	Garda	
1928	Seán Óg Murphy (2)	Cork	Blackrock (5)	
1929	Dinny Barry-Murphy	Cork	Éire Óg	
1930	John Joe Callanan	Tipperary	Thurles Sarsfields (4)	
1931	Eudie Coughlan	Cork	Blackrock (6)	
1932	Jimmy Walsh (1)	Kilkenny	Carrickshock (1)	
1933	Eddie Doyle	Kilkenny	Mooncoin (5)	
1934	Timmy Ryan	Limerick	Ahane (1)	
1935	Lory Meagher	Kilkenny	Tullaroan (4)	
1936	Mick Mackey (1)	Limerick	Ahane (2)	
1937	Jimmy Lanigan	Tipperary	Thurles Sarsfields (5)	
1938	Mick Daniels	Dublin	Army Metro	
1939	Jimmy Walsh (2)	Kilkenny	Carrickshock (2)	
1940	Mick Mackey (2)	Limerick	Ahane (3)	
1941	Connie Buckley	Cork	Glen Rovers (1-2)	
1942	Jack Lynch	Cork	Glen Rovers (1-2)	
1943	Mick Kennefick	Cork	St. Finbarr's (1-2)	
1944	Seán Condon	Cork	St. Finbarr's (1-2)	
1945	John Maher	Tipperary	Thurles Sarsfields (6)	
1946	Christy Ring (1)	Cork	Glen Rovers (3)	
1947	Dan Kennedy	Kilkenny	Thomastown	
1948	Jim Ware	Waterford	Erin's Own	
1949	Pat Stakelum	Tipperary	Holycross-Ballycahill	
1950	Seán Kenny	Tipperary	Borris-Ileigh (1-2)	
1951	Jimmy Finn	Tipperary	Borris-Ileigh (1-2)	
1952	Paddy Barry	Cork	Sarsfield's	
1953	Christy Ring (2)	Cork	Glen Rovers (4-5)	
1954	Christy Ring (3)	Cork	Glen Rovers (4-5)	
1955	Nick O'Donnell	Wexford	St. Aidan's	
1956	Jim English	Wexford	Rathnure (1)	
1957	Mickey Kelly	Kilkenny	Bennettsbridge (1)	
1958	Tony Wall	Tipperary	Thurles Sarsfields (7)	
1959	Frankie Walsh	Waterford	Mount Sion	
1960	Nick O'Donnell	Wexford	St. Aidan's	
1961	Matt Hassett	Tipperary	Toomevara (1)	
1962	Jimmy Doyle (1)	Tipperary	Thurles Sarsfields (8)	
1963	Séamus Cleere	Kilkenny	Bennettsbridge (2)	
1964	Mick Murphy	Tipperary	Thurles Sarsfields (9-10)	
1965	Jimmy Doyle (2)	Tipperary	Thurles Sarsfields (9-10)	
1966	Gerald McCarthy	Cork	St. Finbarr's (3)	
1967	Jim Treacy	Kilkenny	Bennettsbridge (3)	
1968	Dan Quigley	Wexford	Rathnure (2)	
1969	Eddie Keher	Kilkenny	Rower-Inistioge	
1970	Paddy Barry	Cork	St. Vincent's	
1971	Tadhg O'Connor	Tipperary	Roscrea	
1972	Noel Skehan	Kilkenny	Bennettsbridge (4)	
1973	Éamonn Grimes	Limerick	South Liberties	
1974	Nicky Orr	Kilkenny	Fenians (1-2)	
1975	Billy Fitzpatrick	Kilkenny	Fenians (1-2)	
1976	Ray Cummins	Cork	Blackrock (7)	
1977	Martin O'Doherty	Cork	Glen Rovers (6)	
1978	Charlie McCarthy	Cork	St. Finbarr's (4)	
1979	Ger Fennelly	Kilkenny	Ballyhale Shamrocks (1)	
1980	Joe Connolly	Galway	Castlegar	
1981	Pádraig Horan	Offaly	St. Rynagh's (1)	
1982	Brian Cody	Kilkenny	James Stephens (1)	
1983	Liam Fennelly (1)	Kilkenny	Ballyhale Shamrocks (2)	
1984	John Fenton	Cork	Midleton	
1985	Pat Fleury	Offaly	Drumcullen	
1986	Tom Cashman	Cork	Blackrock (8)	
1987	Conor Hayes (1)	Galway	Kiltormer (1-2)	
1988	Conor Hayes (2)	Galway	Kiltormer (1-2)	
1989	Bobby Ryan	Tipperary	Borris Ileigh (3)	
1990	Tomás Mulcahy	Cork	Glen Rovers (7)	
1991	Declan Carr	Tipperary	Holycross-Ballycahill	
1992	Liam Fennelly (2)	Kilkenny	Ballyhale Shamrocks (3)	
1993	Eddie O'Connor	Kilkenny	Glenmore (1)	
1994	Martin Hanamy	Offaly	St. Rynagh's (2)	
1995	Anthony Daly (1)	Clare	Clarecastle (1)	
1996	Martin Storey	Wexford	Oulart-the Ballagh	
1997	Anthony Daly (2)	Clare	Clarecastle (2)	
1998	Hubert Rigney	Offaly	St. Rynagh's (3)	
1999	Mark Landers	Cork	Killeagh	
2000	Willie O'Connor	Kilkenny	Glenmore (2)	
2001	Tommy Dunne	Tipperary	Toomevara (2)	
2002	Andy Comerford	Kilkenny	O'Loughlin Gaels (1)	
2003	D. J. Carey	Kilkenny	Young Irelands	
2004	Ben O'Connor	Cork	Newtownshandrum	
2005	Seán Óg Ó hAilpín	Cork	Na Piarsaigh	
2006	Jackie Tyrrell	Kilkenny	James Stephens (2)	
2007	Henry Shefflin	Kilkenny	Ballyhale Shamrocks (4-6)	
2008	James 'Cha' Fitzpatrick	Kilkenny	Ballyhale Shamrocks (4-6)	
2009	Michael Fennelly	Kilkenny	Ballyhale Shamrocks (4-6)	
2010	Eoin Kelly	Tipperary	Mullinahone	
2011	Brian Hogan	Kilkenny	O'Loughlin Gaels (2)	
2012	Eoin Larkin	Kilkenny	James Stephens (3)	
2013	Patrick Donnellan	Clare	O'Callaghan's Mills	
2014	Lester Ryan	Kilkenny	Clara	
2015	Joseph Holden	Kilkenny	Ballyhale Shamrocks (7)	
2016	Brendan Maher	Tipperary	Borris Ileigh (4)	
2017	David Burke	Galway	St Thomas'(1)	
2018	Declan Hannon (1)	Limerick	Adare (1)	
2019	Séamus Callanan	Tipperary	Drom-Inch	
2020	Declan Hannon (2)	Limerick	Adare (2-4)	
2021	Declan Hannon (3)	Limerick	Adare (2-4)	
2022	Declan Hannon (4)	Limerick	Adare (2-4)	
2023	Cian Lynch	Limerick	Patrickswell	
2024	Tony Kelly	Clare	Ballyea	
2025	Ronan Maher	Tipperary	Thurles Sarsfields	
2026	Cian Lynch	Limerick	Patrickswell	

== Records ==
Year	Name	County	Club	Age	Ref
1902	Jamesy Kelleher	Cork	Dungourney	26 years, 164 days	
1903	Steva Riordan	Cork	Blackrock	28 years, 323 days	
1904	Jer Doheny	Kilkenny	Threecastles	31 years, 339 days	
1905	D.J. Stapleton	Kilkenny	Erin's Own	21 years, 32 days	
1906	Tom Semple	Tipperary	Thurles Sarsfields	28 years, 202 days	
1907	Dick Walsh	Kilkenny	Mooncoin	30 years, 174 days	
1908	Tom Semple	Tipperary	Thurles Sarsfields	30 years, 80 days	
1909	Dick Walsh	Kilkenny	Mooncoin	31 years, 347 days	
1910	Dick Doyle	Wexford	Castlebridge	32 years, 206 days	
1911	Sim Walton	Kilkenny	Tullaroan	30 years, 327 days	
1912	Sim Walton	Kilkenny	Tullaroan	32 years, 74 days	
1913	Dick Walsh	Kilkenny	Mooncoin	35 years, 307 days	
1914	Amby Power	Clare	Tulla	30 years, 243 days	
1915	Jack Finlay	Laois	Ballygeehan	26 years, 136 days	
1916	Johnny Leahy	Tipperary	Boherlahan	25 years, 25 days	
1917	John Ryan	Dublin	Collegians	27 years, 219 days	
1918	Willie Hough	Limerick	Newcastle West	26 years, 267 days	
1919	Jimmy Kennedy	Cork	Carrigtwohill	28 years, 158 days	
1920	Bob McConkey	Dublin	Faughs	36 years, 26 days	
1921	Bob McConkey	Limerick	Young Irelands	28 years, 52 days	
1922	Wattie Dunphy	Kilkenny	Mooncoin	27 years, 181 days	
1923	Mick Kenny	Galway	Tynagh	32 years, 66 days	
1924	Frank Wall	Dublin		25 years, 53 days	
1925	Johnny Leahy	Tipperary	Boherlahan	33 years, 253 days	
1926	Seán Óg Murphy	Cork	Blackrock	34 years, 37 days	
1927	Mick Gill	Dublin	Garda	27 years, 347 days	
1928	Seán Óg Murphy	Cork	Blackrock	35 years, 358 days	
1929	Dinny Barry-Murphy	Cork	Éire Óg	26 years, 46 days	
1930	John Joe Callanan	Tipperary	Thurles Sarsfields	36 years, 181 days	
1931	Eudie Coughlan	Cork	Blackrock	31 years, 67 days	
1932	Jimmy Walsh	Kilkenny	Carrickshock	21 years, 213 days	
1933	Eddie Doyle	Kilkenny	Mooncoin	36 years, 214 days	
1934	Timmy Ryan	Limerick	Ahane	25 years, 146 days	
1935	Lory Meagher	Kilkenny	Tullaroan	35 years, 352 days	
1936	Mick Mackey	Limerick	Ahane	24 years, 56 days	
1937	Jimmy Lanigan	Tipperary	Thurles Sarsfields	27 years, 138 days	
1938	Mick Daniels	Dublin	Army Metro	32 years, 326 days	
1939	Jimmy Walsh	Kilkenny	Carrickshock	28 years, 211 days	
1940	Mick Mackey	Limerick	Ahane	28 years, 51 days	
1941	Jack Lynch	Cork	Glen Rovers	25 years, 308 days	
1942	Jack Lynch	Cork	Glen Rovers	25 years, 19 days	
1943	Mick Kennefick	Cork	St. Finbarr's	19 years, 52 days	
1944	Seán Condon	Cork	St. Finbarr's	20 years, 84 days	
1945	John Maher	Tipperary	Thurles Sarsfields	36 years, 330 days	
1946	Christy Ring	Cork	Glen Rovers	25 years, 306 days	
1947	Dan Kennedy	Kilkenny	Thomastown	22 years, 239 days	
1948	Jim Ware	Waterford	Erin's Own	40 years, 195 days	
1949	Pat Stakelum	Tipperary	Holycross-Ballycahill	22 years, 121 days	
1950	Seán Kenny	Tipperary	Borris-Ileigh	26 years, 248 days	
1951	Jimmy Finn	Tipperary	Borris-Ileigh	19 years, 290 days	
1952	Paddy Barry	Cork	Sarsfields	23–24	
1953	Christy Ring	Cork	Glen Rovers	32 years, 312 days	
1954	Christy Ring	Cork	Glen Rovers	33 years, 310 days	
1955	Nick O'Donnell	Wexford	St. Aidan's	30 years, 0 days	
1956	Jim English	Wexford	Rathnure	23–24	
1957	Mickey Kelly	Kilkenny	Bennettsbridge	27 years, 342 days	
1958	Tony Wall	Tipperary	Thurles Sarsfields	24 years, 121 days	
1959	Frankie Walsh	Waterford	Mount Sion	22–23	
1960	Nick O'Donnell	Wexford	St. Aidan's	35 years, 0 days	
1961	Matt Hassett	Tipperary	Toomevara	28–29	
1962	Jimmy Doyle	Tipperary	Thurles Sarsfields	23 years, 166 days	
1963	Séamus Cleere	Kilkenny	Bennettsbridge	22–23	
1964	Mick Murphy	Tipperary	Thurles Sarsfields	23–24	
1965	Jimmy Doyle	Tipperary	Thurles Sarsfields	26 years, 169 days	
1966	Gerald McCarthy	Cork	St. Finbarr's	20 years, 357 days	
1967	Jim Treacy	Kilkenny	Bennettsbridge	23–24	
1968	Dan Quigley	Wexford	Rathnure	23–24	
1969	Eddie Keher	Kilkenny	Rower-Inistioge	27 years, 328 days	
1971	Tadhg O'Connor	Tipperary	Roscrea	22–23	
1972	Noel Skehan	Kilkenny	Bennettsbridge	26 years, 272 days	
1973	Éamonn Grimes	Limerick	South Liberties	25–26	
1974	Nicky Orr	Kilkenny	Fenians	27 years, 190 days	
1975	Billy Fitzpatrick	Kilkenny	Fenians	21 years, 154 days	
1976	Ray Cummins	Cork	Blackrock	27 years, 301 days	
1977	Martin O'Doherty	Cork	Glen Rovers	25 years, 162 days	
1978	Charlie McCarthy	Cork	St. Finbarr's	31–32	
1979	Ger Fennelly	Kilkenny	Ballyhale Shamrocks	25 years, 223 days	
1980	Joe Connolly	Galway	Castlegar	23 years, 330 days	
1981	Pádraig Horan	Offaly	St. Rynagh's	31 years, 138 days	
1982	Brian Cody	Kilkenny	James Stephens	28 years, 55 days	
1983	Liam Fennelly	Kilkenny	Ballyhale Shamrocks	25 years, 246 days	
1984	John Fenton	Cork	Midleton	28 years, 266 days	
1985	Pat Fleury	Offaly	Drumcullen	29 years, 106 days	
1986	Tom Cashman	Cork	Blackrock	29 years, 41 days	
1987	Conor Hayes	Galway	Kiltormer	29 years, 118 days	
1988	Conor Hayes	Galway	Kiltormer	30 years, 116 days	
1989	Bobby Ryan	Tipperary	Borris-Ileigh	27 years, 315 days	
1990	Tomás Mulcahy	Cork	Glen Rovers	27 years, 68 days	
1991	Declan Carr	Tipperary	Holycross-Ballycahill	26 years, 33 days	
1992	Liam Fennelly	Kilkenny	Ballyhale Shamrocks	34 years, 249 days	
1993	Eddie O'Connor	Kilkenny	Glenmore	28 years, 334 days	
1994	Martin Hanamy	Offaly	St. Rynagh's	27 years, 287 days	
1995	Anthony Daly	Clare	Clarecastle	25 years, 316 days	
1996	Martin Storey	Wexford	Oulart-the Ballagh	31 years, 339 days	
1997	Anthony Daly	Clare	Clarecastle	27 years, 327 days	
1998	Hubert Rigney	Offaly	St. Rynagh's	27 years, 45 days	
1999	Mark Landers	Cork	Killeagh	27 years, 61 days	
2000	Willie O'Connor	Kilkenny	Glenmore	33 years, 180 days	
2001	Tommy Dunne	Tipperary	Toomevara	27 years, 111 days	
2002	Andy Comerford	Kilkenny	O'Loughlin Gaels	29 years, 328 days	
2003	D. J. Carey	Kilkenny	Young Irelands	32 years, 300 days	
2004	Ben O'Connor	Cork	Newtownshandrum	25 years, 231 days	
2005	Seán Óg Ó hAilpín	Cork	Na Piarsaigh	28 years, 112 days	
2006	Jackie Tyrrell	Kilkenny	James Stephens	24 years, 76 days	
2007	Henry Shefflin	Kilkenny	Ballyhale Shamrocks	28 years, 234 days	
2008	James Fitzpatrick	Kilkenny	Ballyhale Shamrocks	23 years, 220 days	
2009	Michael Fennelly	Kilkenny	Ballyhale Shamrocks	24 years, 190 days	
2010	Eoin Kelly	Tipperary	Mullinahone	28 years, 242 days	
2011	Brian Hogan	Kilkenny	O'Loughlin Gaels	30 years, 21 days	
2012	Eoin Larkin	Kilkenny	James Stephens	28 years, 75 days	
2013	Patrick Donnellan	Clare	O'Callaghan's Mills	28 years, 101 days	
2014	Lester Ryan	Kilkenny	Clara	26 years, 149 days	
2015	Joey Holden	Kilkenny	Ballyhale Shamrocks	25 years, 66 days	
2016	Brendan Maher	Tipperary	Borris-Ileigh	27 years, 243 days	
2017	David Burke	Galway	St. Thomas'	27 years, 239 days	
2018	Declan Hannon	Limerick	Adare	25 years, 267 days	
2019	Séamus Callanan	Tipperary	Drom & Inch	30 years, 337 days	
2020	Declan Hannon	Limerick	Adare	28 years, 18 days	
2021	Declan Hannon	Limerick	Adare	28 years, 270 days	
2022	Declan Hannon	Limerick	Adare	29 years, 234 days	
2023	Cian Lynch	Limerick	Patrickswell	27 years, 201 days	
2024	Tony Kelly	Clare	Ballyea	30 years, 219 days	
2025	Ronan Maher	Tipperary	Thurles Sarsfields	29 years, 284 days	

== See also ==
- Liam MacCarthy Cup
- List of All-Ireland Senior Football Championship winning captains
