= Sim Walton =

Kilkenny hurler (1880–1966)

Personal information
- Native name: Simóin de Bháltún (Irish)
- Nickname: Little Sim
- Born: 4 October 1880 Tullaroan, County Kilkenny, Ireland
- Died: 27 December 1966 (aged 86) Tullaroan, County Kilkenny, Ireland
- Occupation: Farmer
- Height: 5 ft 9 in (175 cm)

Sport
- Sport: Hurling
- Position: Full-forward
Club
- Years: Club
- Tullaroan
Club titles
- Kilkenny titles: 7
Inter-county*
| Years | County | Apps (scores) |
| 1902–1919 | Kilkenny | 49 |
Inter-county titles
- Leinster titles: 9
- All-Irelands: 7
- *Inter County team apps and scores correct as of 20:27, 20 July 2013.

Simon F. "Sim" Walton (4 October 1880 – 27 December 1966) was an Irish hurler who played as a full-forward at senior level for the Kilkenny county team.

Born in Tullaroan, County Kilkenny, Walton first arrived on the inter-county scene at the age of twenty-two when made his senior debut in the delayed 1900 championship. Walton went on to play a key part for Kilkenny during the team's breakthrough and first golden age, and won seven All-Ireland medals and nine Leinster medals. An All-Ireland runner-up on one occasion, Walton also captained the team to All-Ireland victory in 1911 and 1912.

At club level Walton won seven championship medals with Tullaroan.

Walton was regarded as one of the top scorers of his generation and, in spite of an absence of records, it is believed he scored upwards of 30 goals.

Throughout his career Walton made 49 championship appearances, a Kilkenny record which stood until 24 July 1977 when it was surpassed by Eddie Keher. His retirement came following Kilkenny's defeat by Dublin in the 1919 championship.

Walton's grandnephew, Liam Doyle, was an All-Ireland medallist with Clare in 1995 and 1997.

== Playing career ==
=== Club ===
Walton played his club hurling with Tullaroan and enjoyed much success during a lengthy career.

In 1901 he lined out in his first county championship decider. A high-scoring 5–10 to 3–7 defeat of Threecastles gave Walton his first championship medal. Tullaroan retained the title in 1902, with Walton collecting his second medal following a 3–16 to 0-1 trouncing of Mooncoin.

Three-in-a-row proved beyond Tullaroan, however, the team returned to glory in 1904. A comprehensive 6–14 to 1–6 defeat of Piltown saw Walton add a third championship medal to his collection.

After losing back-to-back decider in 1905 and 1906, Walton collected a fourth championship medal in 1907 after Mooncoin were defeated by 2–6 to 1–3.

Walton won a fifth championship medal in 1910, as Tullaroan defeated Piltown by 7–1 to 3–0. A 4–4 to 2–5 defeat of Mooncoin in 1911 saw Tullaroan retain the title, while Walton collected a sixth championship medal.

In 1915 Walton won his seventh and final championship medal, following a 7–2 to 2–2 defeat of Dicksboro.

=== Inter-county ===
==== Beginnings ====
Walton made his debut for Kilkenny on 29 June 1902. Tipperary provided the opposition in the delayed 1900 All-Ireland semi-final, however, Kilkenny were narrowly defeated by 1–11 to 1–8.

In 1903 Walton lined out in his first provincial decider. Dublin were the opponents and the game ended in a 1-5 apiece draw. Kilkenny later objected to the result and were subsequently awarded the title as Dublin's goal was disputed. It was Walton's first Leinster medal. The 'home' All-Ireland final on 16 July 1905 pitted Kilkenny against Cork. In a disappointing contest Walton's side were heavily defeated by 8–9 to 0–8.

==== Breakthrough ====
Walton added a second Leinster medal to his collection in 1904, as Dublin were narrowly defeated by 2–8 to 2–6. Cork provided the opposition in the subsequent All-Ireland decider on 24 June 1906, the start of which was delayed by half an hour due to a heavy downpour. Kilkenny played into the breeze for the opening thirty minutes, and a Dick Doyle gave the team an interval lead of 1–5 to 0–5. Team captain Jer Doheny and goalkeeper Pat "Fox" Maher were singled out for particular praise as Kilkenny claimed a narrow 1–9 to 1–8 victory. It was Walton's first All-Ireland medal.

Kilkenny made it three provincial titles in-a-row in 1905, with Walton collecting a third Leinster medal following a 2–8 to 2–2 defeat of Dublin. Kilkenny later faced Cork in the All-Ireland final on 14 April 1907. A high-scoring game resulted in a 5–10 to 3–13 victory for Cork, however, the game had to be replayed as Cork goalkeeper Daniel McCarthy was a British army reservist and Kilkenny's Matt Gargan had played with Waterford in the Munster championship. The replayed game on 30 June 1907 was another high-scoring one, with Jimmy Kelly scoring 5–2. A puck-out by Cork's Jamesy Kelleher is said to have hopped over the Kilkenny crossbar. Kilkenny won the game by 7–7 to 2–9, with all seven of their goals coming in a thirty-minute spell. It was Walton's second All-Ireland medal.

After surrendering their provincial and All-Ireland crowns in 1906, Kilkenny bounced back the following year. A 4–14 to 1–9 defeat of Dublin gave Walton a fourth Leinster medal. On 21 June 1908 Kilkenny faced Cork in what was then seen as the greatest All-Ireland decider. After a thrilling hour the game looked like ending in a draw, however, Jack Anthony cleared his lines and set up one final attack for Kilkenny. Jimmy Kelly met the sliotar on the drop and set it over for a point with the last puck of the game. The 3–12 to 4–8 victory gave Walton his third All-Ireland medal.

In 1909 Walton won his fifth Leinster medal following a 5–16 to 2–7 defeat of Laois. The subsequent All-Ireland decider on 12 December 1909 saw Kilkenny face Tipperary. The game was noted for its hard physical exchanges, however, a 4–6 to 0–12 victory saw Kilkenny defeat Tipperary for the very first time in championship hurling. It was Walton's fourth All-Ireland medal.

==== Three-in-a-row ====
Walton was appointed captain in 1911 and won a sixth Leinster medal as Kilkenny defeated Dublin by 4–6 to 3–1. There was controversy in the subsequent All-Ireland series as Kilkenny were destined to play Limerick in the decider on 18 February 1912. On the first occasion the pitch at the Cork Athletic Grounds was water-logged and the game was fixed for Thurles on 28 July 1912. A substitute contest was played on 28 July 1912 when Tipperary faced Kilkenny after being nominated as provincial representatives by the Munster Council. A 3–3 to 2–1 victory gave Walton his fifth All-Ireland medal.

After retaining the captaincy for 1912, Walton won a seventh Leinster medal following a 6–6 to 2-4 trouncing of Laois. On 17 November 1912 Kilkenny faced old rivals Cork in the All-Ireland decider. In the last seventeen-a-side final, a record crowd of over 20,000 thronged Jones's Road, while the gate receipts of £600 were a record high. Walton was credited with scoring the winning goal, while he also had the honour of lifting the cup on behalf of his team. It was his sixth All-Ireland medal.

In 1913 Kilkenny set out to capture a record-equalling third successive All-Ireland championship. After a low scoring 1–0 to 0-3 drawn game with Dublin in the provincial decider, Kilkenny secured a comprehensive 7–5 to 2–1 victory in the replay. It was Walton's eighth Leinster medal. On 2 November 1913 Kilkenny faced near rivals Tipperary in the All-Ireland decider. A fast-paced game followed, with victory going to Kilkenny on a 2–4 to 1–2 score line. It was a remarkable seventh All-Ireland medal for Walton.

==== Decline ====
Four-in-a-row proved beyond Kilkenny and the team went into decline.

Walton returned as captain once again in 1916 as Kilkenny bounced back. An 11–3 to 2-2 trouncing of Wexford gave him his ninth Leinster medal. On 21 January 1917 Kilkenny faced Tipperary in the All-Ireland final, while Walton was presented with the chance of making history by becoming the first player to win eight All-Ireland medals. Kilkenny, however, were not the force they once were, and a 5–4 to 3–2 score line resulted in victory for Tipperary.

On 10 August 1919 Walton made his farewell appearance for Kilkenny. A narrow 1–5 to 1–2 defeat by Dublin in the Leinster final brought the curtain down on his lengthy career.

== Recognition ==
In time Walton came to be regarded as one of Kilkenny's greatest players.

Over twenty years after his death, Walton received the ultimate honour during the centenary of the Tullaroan club in 1988 when he was chosen on the club's Team of the Century.

== Personal life ==
Walton was born in Reimeen, Tullaroan, County Kilkenny in 1880. He grew up on the family farm and was educated at the local national school. Walton inherited a love of hurling from his father, John Walton, who won a championship medal with Tullaroan in 1887..

As well as hurling Walton also had a very keen interest in greyhound racing. He kept many championship greyhounds, the most famous of the all, Captain Sim, ran in the Waterloo Cup.

Walton died in 1966.

== Honours ==
=== Team ===
Tullaroan

- Kilkenny Senior Hurling Championship (7): 1901, 1902, 1904, 1907, 1910, 1911, 1915

Kilkenny

- All-Ireland Senior Hurling Championship (7): 1904, 1905, 1907, 1909, 1911 (c), 1912 (c), 1913
- Leinster Senior Hurling Championship (9): 1903, 1904, 1905, 1907, 1909, 1911 (c), 1912 (c), 1913, 1916 (c)

Sporting positions
| Preceded by | Kilkenny Senior Hurling Captain; 1911–1912 | Succeeded by Dick "Drug" Walsh |
| Preceded by | Kilkenny Senior Hurling Captain; 1916–1917 | Succeeded by |
Achievements
| Preceded by Dick Doyle (Wexford) | All-Ireland SHC winning captain 1911-1912 | Succeeded by Dick "Drug" Walsh (Kilkenny) |
