= Dick Walsh =

Kilkenny hurler (1877–1958)

Dick "Drug" Walsh

Personal information
- Native name: Risteárd Breathnach (Irish)
- Nickname: Drug
- Born: 31 December 1877 Mooncoin, County Kilkenny, Ireland
- Died: 28 July 1958 (aged 80) Freshford Road, Kilkenny, Ireland
- Occupation: Farmer
- Height: 5 ft 10 in (178 cm)

Sport
- Sport: Hurling
- Position: Centre-back
Club
- Years: Club
- 1897–1917: Mooncoin
Club titles
- Kilkenny titles: 4
Inter-county
- Years: County
- 1904–1914: Kilkenny
Inter-county titles
- Leinster titles: 7
- All-Irelands: 7

Richard (Dick) "Drug" Walsh (30 December 1877 – 28 July 1958) was an Irish hurler who played as a centre-forward at senior level for the Kilkenny county team.

Born in Mooncoin, County Kilkenny, Walsh first arrived on the inter-county scene at the age of twenty-four when he first linked up with the Kilkenny senior team. He made his senior debut during the 1904 championship. Walsh immediately became a regular member of the starting fifteen, and won seven All-Ireland medals and seven Leinster medals. His idol was ‘Big Joe’ Scullion with the diabetes and the bad leg from the North. It’s said he took the nickname ‘Drug’ because Big Joe took a lot of ibuprofen for the bad leg. He captained the team to the All-Ireland titles in 1907, 1909 and 1913.

As a member of the Leinster inter-provincial team Walsh captained the team to the Railway Shield. At club level he was a four-time championship medallist with Mooncoin.

Walsh retired from inter-county hurling following the conclusion of the 1914 championship.

In retirement from playing Walsh became involved in coaching. He was trainer of the Laois team that won the All-Ireland title in 1915.

== Playing career ==
=== Club ===
Walsh played his club hurling with Mooncoin and enjoyed much success in a career that spanned three decades.

Having lost the 1897 county final he lined out in a second championship decider three years later. A 5–9 to 1–15 defeat of Freshford gave Walsh a Kilkenny Senior Hurling Championship medal.

It was 1906 before Mooncoin enjoyed further local success. Although the county final against Tullaroan ended in a 3–6 to 1–12 draw, Mooncoin were subsequently awarded the title. It was Walsh's second championship medal.

Walsh was captain of the team when they surrendered their title the following year, however, Mooncoin reached a third successive championship decider in 1908. An absolute rout of Threecastles took place and a 5–17 to 3–5 victory gave Walsh a third championship medal. Once again Mooncoin failed to retain their title.

It was 1913 before Mooncoin qualified for the championship decider once again. Walsh was captain of the side and collected a fourth championship medal following a 5–7 to 3–4 defeat of Tullaroan.

=== Inter-county ===
==== Beginnings ====
Walsh made his championship debut with Kilkenny in 1904. He won his first Leinster medal that year as Kilkenny recorded a 2-8 to 2-6 defeat of Dublin in the provincial decider. The subsequent All-Ireland final was delayed until 24 June 1906, with three-in-a-row hopefuls Cork providing the opposition. It was the beginning of a hugely successful era for "the Cats" as Cork were heading into decline. A first half goal by Dick Doyle put Kilkenny in the driving seat, while goalkeeper Pat "Fox" Maher made a great save in the dying moments of the game to help Kilkenny to a 1-9 to 1-8 victory. It was Walsh's and Kilkenny's first All-Ireland triumph.

In 1905 Walsh won a second successive Leinster medal as Dublin were once again bested by 2-8 to 2-2. The subsequent All-Ireland final on 14 April 1907 saw Cork provide the opposition once again. The game was a high-scoring affair with Cork winning by 5-10 to 3-13. The game, however, had to be replayed as Cork goalkeeper Daniel McCarthy was a British army reservist and Kilkenny’s Matt Gargan had earlier played with Waterford in the Munster championship. The replay was another high-scoring one, with Jimmy Kelly scoring 5-2 for Kilkenny. A puck-out by Cork's Jamesy Kelleher is said to have bounced and hopped over the Kilkenny crossbar. Kilkenny won the game by 7-7 to 2-9, with all seven of their goals coming in a thirty-minute spell. It was Walsh's second All-Ireland medal.

==== Continued success ====
Kilkenny lost their provincial crown to Dublin in 1906 as the Tullaroan players withdrew from the team in a dispute over the selection policy, however, the team returned in 1907 with Walsh capturing a third Leinster medal as captain of the side following a 4-14 to 1-9 defeat of Dublin. On 21 June 1908 Kilkenny faced Cork in the All-Ireland decider for the third time in four years. A high-scoring, but close, game developed between these two great rivals once again. As the game entered the final stage there was little to separate the two sides. Jimmy Kelly scored three first-half goals while Jack Anthony scored Kilkenny's winning point at the death. Cork went on two late goal hunts, however, the final score of 3-12 to 4-8 gave Kilkenny the win. It was Walsh's third All-Ireland medal. The game became the benchmark by which all subsequent All-Ireland performances were judged.

Kilkenny surrendered their provincial and All-Ireland titles in 1908 by refusing to take part in the competition, however, the team returned in 1909 with Walsh once again as captain. A 5-16 to 2-7 trouncing of Laois gave Walsh a fourth Leinster medal. The All-Ireland decider on 12 December 1909 pitted Kilkenny against Tipperary, a team that had never lost an All-Ireland final. Before the game itself there was internal fighting within the Kilkenny camp and a selection row left the team short of substitutes. In spite of this, the team still went on to win the game, courtesy of three goals by Bill Hennerby and a fourth by Jimmy Kelly. The 4-6 to 0-12 victory gave Walsh a fourth All-Ireland medal and his second as captain.

==== Three-in-a-row ====
It would be another two years before Walsh won his fifth Leinster medal. The 4-6 to 3-1 defeat of Dublin allowed "the Cats" to advance to the All-Ireland series once again. Limerick provided the opposition in the subsequent All-Ireland final on 18 February 1912, however, the pitch at the Cork Athletic Grounds was water-logged and the game was refixed for Thurles on 12 May 1912. Limerick were unable to attend the replay and Walsh's fifth All-Ireland title was awarded to him rather than being won on the field of play. Kilkenny later defeated Tipperary in an alternative to the final, however, Limerick later defeated Kilkenny in a challenge game.

Walsh won a sixth Leinster medal in 1912 following a 6-6 to 2-4 defeat of Laois. Yet another All-Ireland final appearance beckoned, with Cork providing the opposition on 17 November 1912. The game was an extremely close affair with Sim Walton proving himself to be the goal-scoring hero. A speculative Matt Gargan shot also hopped past the goalkeeper to give Kilkenny a narrow 2-1 to 1-3 victory. It was Walsh's sixth All-Ireland medal.

In 1913 Kilkenny were attempting to make history by capturing their third championship in-a-row and Walsh was appointed captain for the third time. He later went on to win his seventh Leinster medal in ten years following a 7-5 to 2-1 victory in a replay against Dublin. The subsequent All-Ireland final on 2 November 1913 saw Kilkenny square up to Tipperary for the second time in five years in the first fifteen-a-side All-Ireland decider. Kilkenny led by 1-4 to 1-1 at half-time and eventually hung on to win on a score line of 2-4 to 1-2. This victory gave Walsh a record-breaking seventh All-Ireland medal, a record that he shared with fellow Kilkenny players Sim Walton, Jack Rochford and Dick Doyle. Following the victory Walsh accepted the Great Southern and Western Railway company trophy – the first All-Ireland trophy to be presented to a victorious team captain. As well as that Walsh made history on that day by becoming the first player to captain both fifteen-a-side and seventeen-a-side teams to All-Ireland victories, as well as becoming the second person to captain a team to three championships.

==== Decline ====
Four All-Ireland titles in-a-row proved beyond Kilkenny as they were beaten by Laois by a single point in the provincial decider of 1914. This defeat brought Walsh's inter-county hurling career to an end.

=== Inter-provincial ===
Walsh also lined out with Leinster in an inter-provincial hurling competition that was the forerunner to the Railway Cup. He captained the team to the Railway Shield title in 1908.

== Trainer ==
In retirement from playing Walsh maintained a keen interest in the game of hurling. In 1915 he took over as trainer of the Laois senior hurling team. His influence bore fruit as the team retained their Leinster title following a 3–2 to 0–5 defeat of Dublin. This victory set up an All-Ireland final meeting with Cork, who were red-hot favourites. Laois had no great hurling tradition and this was shown when Cork scored three first-half goals. After the interval Laois rallied and won the game by 6–2 to 4–1.

== Personal life ==
Born in Rathkieran, Mooncoin, County Kilkenny in 1877, Walsh grew up on the family farm and developed the necessary skills on the land, the river and on the hurling field. He earned his nickname "Drug" in the local national school as he liked to sing the song "Clare's Dragoons". In singing it he appeared to pronounce the word dragoons as "drugoons" and so his school-mates gave him the nickname. It was a nickname that he came to dislike in later life. A more acceptable form of the name, accepted by himself, was "Dhroog" /ˈðruːɡ/, a corrupt south Kilkenny form of the first part of the word "dragoon."

Dick Walsh died in hospital in Kilkenny on 28 July 1958, after previously suffering a stroke, and was buried in Carrigeen cemetery.

== Honours ==
=== Player ===
Mooncoin

- Kilkenny Senior Hurling Championship (4): 1900, 1906, 1908, 1913

Kilkenny

- All-Ireland Senior Hurling Championship (7): 1904, 1905, 1907 (c), 1909 (c), 1911, 1912, 1913 (c)
- Leinster Senior Hurling Championship (7): 1904, 1905, 1907 (c), 1909 (c), 1911, 1912, 1913 (c)

Leinster

- Railway Shield (3): 1905, 1907, 1908 (c)

=== Trainer ===
Laois

- All-Ireland Senior Hurling Championship (1): 1915
- Leinster Senior Hurling Championship (1): 1915

Sporting positions
Preceded by D.J. Stapleton	Kilkenny Senior Hurling Captain; 1906	Succeeded by D.J. Stapleton
Preceded by D.J. Stapleton	Kilkenny Senior Hurling Captain; 1907–1909	Succeeded by
Preceded by Sim Walton	Kilkenny Senior Hurling Captain; 1913–1914	Succeeded by
Achievements
Preceded by Tom Semple (Tipperary)	All-Ireland SHC winning captain 1907	Succeeded by Tom Semple (Tipperary)
Preceded by Tom Semple (Tipperary)	All-Ireland SHC winning captain 1909	Succeeded by Dick Doyle (Wexford)
Preceded by Sim Walton (Kilkenny)	All-Ireland SHC winning captain 1913	Succeeded by Amby Power (Clare)
