= Hurling records in Ireland =

This page details hurling records in Ireland.

== All-Ireland Championship ==
=== Final ===
==== Team ====
- Most wins: 36 (Kilkenny), 1904, 1905, 1907, 1909, 1911, 1912, 1913, 1922, 1932, 1933, 1935, 1939, 1947, 1957, 1963, 1967, 1969, 1972, 1974, 1975, 1979, 1982, 1983, 1992, 1993, 2000, 2002, 2003, 2006, 2007, 2008, 2009, 2011, 2012, 2014, 2015.
- Most consecutive All-Ireland titles: 4, Cork (1941, 1942, 1943, 1944) and Kilkenny (2006, 2007, 2008, 2009) and Limerick (2020, 2021, 2022, 2023)
- Most appearances: 65, Kilkenny (1893, 1895, 1897, 1898, 1904, 1905, 1907, 1909, 1911, 1912, 1913, 1916, 1922, 1926, 1931, 1932, 1933, 1935, 1936, 1937, 1939, 1940, 1945, 1946, 1947, 1950, 1957, 1959, 1963, 1964, 1966, 1967, 1969, 1971, 1972, 1973, 1974, 1975, 1978, 1979, 1982, 1983, 1987, 1991, 1992, 1993, 1998, 1999, 2000, 2002, 2003, 2004, 2006, 2007, 2008, 2009, 2010, 2011, 2012, 2014, 2015, 2016, 2019, 2022, 2023.
- Most appearances without winning: 9, Galway (1924, 1925, 1928, 1929, 1953, 1955, 1958, 1975, 1979).
- Biggest win: 1896: 34 points, Tipperary (8–14) vs. Dublin (0–4)
- All-Ireland Victory in Every Decade: 14, 1880s - 2010s, Tipperary

==== Individual ====
- Most wins on the field of play: 10:
  - Henry Shefflin (Kilkenny) (2000, 2002, 2003, 2006, 2007, 2008, 2009, 2011, 2012, 2014)
- Most wins (including as a substitute): 9:
  - Noel Hickey (Kilkenny) (2000, 2002, 2003, 2006, 2007, 2008, 2009 (sub), 2011, 2012)
  - Noel Skehan (Kilkenny) (1963 (sub), 1967 (sub), 1969 (sub), 1972, 1974, 1975, 1979, 1982, 1983)
- Most final appearances: 15:
  - Henry Shefflin (Kilkenny) (1999, 2000, 2002, 2003, 2004, 2006, 2007, 2008, 2009, 2010, 2011, 2012 and replay, 2014 and replay)
- Winners of All-Ireland medals on the field of play in three decades::
  - John Doyle (Tipperary) (1949, 1950, 1951, 1958, 1961, 1962, 1964, 1965)
  - Declan Ryan (Tipperary) (1989, 1991, 2001)
  - Frank Cummins (Kilkenny) (1969, 1972, 1974, 1975, 1979, 1982, 1983)
  - Jimmy Doyle (Tipperary) (1958, 1961, 1962, 1964, 1965, 1971)
  - Paddy 'Balty' Ahern (Cork) (1919, 1926, 1927, 1929, 1931)
  - Tommy Doyle (Tipperary) (1937, 1945, 1949, 1950, 1951)
