= John T. Power =

Irish hurler

Personal information
- Native name: Seán T. de Paor (Irish)
- Born: 14 April 1883 Piltown, County Kilkenny, Ireland
- Died: 1 February 1982 (aged 98) Kilkenny, Ireland
- Occupation: Farmer

Sport
- Sport: Hurling
- Position: Goalkeeper
Club
- Years: Club
- 1900s-1920s: Piltown / Mooncoin
Club titles
- Kilkenny titles: 2
Inter-county
- Years: County
- 1907-1925: Kilkenny
Inter-county titles
- Leinster titles: 6
- All-Irelands: 4

John T. Power (14 April 1883 – 1 February 1982) was an Irish hurler who played as a goalkeeper for the Kilkenny senior team.

Power made his first appearance for the team during the 1907 championship and was a regular member of the starting fifteen for well over a decade. He made his final appearance when he was recalled briefly for the 1925 championship. During that time Power won four All-Ireland medals and six Leinster medals. He also won a Railway Shield medal with Leinster. He has the unique distinction of becoming the first hurling goalkeeper to win three consecutive All Ireland medals in a row in 1911, 1912 and 1913.

At club level Power played with Piltown, however, it was with Mooncoin that he won two county championship medals.

Following the death of Larry Flaherty in 1979, Power became the oldest living All-Ireland medal winner. His lifetime spanned the entire history of the Gaelic Athletic Association.

The Power Villas housing estate in Main Street, Piltown, County Kilkenny was named in his honour and was built on the site of his former residence a short few years after his death in 1982.

== Honours ==
=== Team ===
Mooncoin

- Kilkenny Senior Hurling Championship (3): 1913, 1916
  - Runners-Up (0):

Piltown

- Kilkenny Senior Hurling Championship **Runners-Up (2): 1904, 1910

Kilkenny

- All-Ireland Senior Hurling Championship (4): 1907, 1911, 1912, 1913
- Leinster Senior Hurling Championship (5): 1907, 1909, 1911, 1912, 1913
