= Jimmy Kelly (Mooncoin hurler) =

Irish hurler (1884–1966)

Personal information
- Native name: Seamus Ó Ceallaigh (Irish)
- Nickname: The wren
- Born: 1884 Mooncoin, County Kilkenny, Ireland
- Died: 1966 (aged 81–82) Mooncoin, County Kilkenny, Ireland
- Occupation: Farmer

Sport
- Sport: Hurling
- Position: Forward
Clubs
- Years: Club
- Ballyduff; Mooncoin
Club titles
- Kilkenny titles: 3
Inter-county
- Years: County
- 1904–1913: Kilkenny
Inter-county titles
- Leinster titles: 7
- All-Irelands: 6

Jimmy "the wren" Kelly (1884–1966) was an Irish hurler who played as a full-forward for the Kilkenny senior hurling team.

Born in Mooncoin, County Kilkenny, Kelly first arrived on the inter-county scene at the age of twenty-two when he first linked up with the Kilkenny senior team. He made his senior debut during the delayed 1904 championship. Kelly subsequently became a regular member of the starting team, and won six All-Ireland medals and seven Leinster medals.

As a member of the Leinster inter-provincial team on a number of occasions, Kelly won three Railway Shield medals. At club level he was a three-time championship medallist with Mooncoin, after beginning his career with Ballyduff.

Kelly retired from inter-county hurling after the 1913 championship.

== Playing career ==
=== Club ===
Kelly began his club hurling career with Ballyduff in 1900, before joining Mooncoin the following year.

After a number of disappointing campaigns, Mooncoin reached the championship decider in 1906. A 3–6 to 1–12 draw with Tullaroan was the result, however, Mooncoin were later awarded the title by the county board. It was Kelly's first championship medal.

Tullaroan avenged that defeat the following year, however, Mooncoin bounced back to reach a third successive final in 1908. A 5–17 to 3–5 trouncing of Threecastles gave Kelly a second championship medal.

Mooncoin failed to retain their title once again, and it was 1913 before Kelly lined out in another championship decider. A 5–7 to 3–4 defeat of Tullaroan gave him a third and final championship medal.

=== Inter-county ===
==== Beginnings ====
Kelly made his debut with the Kilkenny senior team during the 1904 championship. It was a successful campaign as Kilkenny recorded a 2–8 to 2–6 defeat of Dublin in the provincial decider. It was Kilkenny's first Leinster medal.

==== Early successes ====
In 1905 Kelly won a second successive Leinster medal as Dublin were once again bested by 2–8 to 2–2. The subsequent All-Ireland final on 14 April 1907 saw Cork provide the opposition. The game was a high-scoring affair with Cork winning by 5–10 to 3–13. The game, however, had to be replayed as Cork goalkeeper Daniel McCarthy was a British army reservist and Kilkenny's Matt Gargan had earlier played with Waterford in the Munster championship. The replay was another high-scoring one, with Kelly scoring 5–2 for Kilkenny. A puck-out by Cork's Jamesy Kelleher is said to have bounced and hopped over the Kilkenny crossbar. Kilkenny won the game by 7–7 to 2–9, with all seven of their goals coming in a thirty-minute spell. It was Kelly's first All-Ireland medal.

Kilkenny lost their provincial crown to Dublin in 1906 as the Tullaroan players withdrew from the team in a dispute over the selection policy, however, the team returned in 1907 with Kelly capturing a third Leinster medal following a 4–14 to 1–9 defeat of Dublin. On 21 June 1908 Kilkenny faced Cork in the All-Ireland decider for the third time in four years. A high-scoring, but close, game developed between these two great rivals once again. As the game entered the final stage there was little to separate the two sides. Kelly scored three first-half goals while Jack Anthony scored Kilkenny's winning point at the death. Cork went on two late goal hunts, however, the final score of 3–12 to 4–8 gave Kilkenny the win. It was Kelly's second All-Ireland medal. The game became the benchmark by which all subsequent All-Ireland performances were judged.

Kilkenny surrendered their provincial and All-Ireland titles in 1908 by refusing to take part in the competition, however, the team returned in 1909. A 5–16 to 2–7 trouncing of Laois gave Kelly a fourth Leinster medal. The All-Ireland decider on 12 December 1909 pitted Kilkenny against Tipperary, a team that had never lost an All-Ireland final. Before the game itself there was internal fighting within the Kilkenny camp and a selection row left the team short of substitutes. In spite of this, the team still went on to win the game, courtesy of three goals by Bill Hennerby and a fourth by Kelly. The 4–6 to 0–12 victory gave Kelly a third All-Ireland medal.

==== Three-in-a-row ====
It would be another two years before Kelly won his fifth Leinster medal. The 4–6 to 3–1 defeat of Dublin allowed "the Cats" to advance to the All-Ireland series once again. Limerick provided the opposition in the subsequent All-Ireland final on 18 February 1912, however, the pitch at the Cork Athletic Grounds was water-logged and the game was refixed for Thurles on 12 May 1912. Limerick were unable to attend the replay and Kelly's fourth All-Ireland title was awarded to him rather than being won on the field of play. Kilkenny later defeated Tipperary in an alternative to the final, however, Limerick later defeated Kilkenny in a challenge game.

Kelly won a sixth Leinster medal in 1912 following a 6–6 to 2–4 defeat of Laois. Yet another All-Ireland final appearance beckoned, with Cork providing the opposition on 17 November 1912. The game was an extremely close affair with Sim Walton proving himself to be the goal-scoring hero. A speculative Matt Gargan shot also hopped past the goalkeeper to give Kilkenny a narrow 2–1 to 1–3 victory. It was Kelly's fifth All-Ireland medal.

In 1913 Kelly won his seventh Leinster title in nine years following a 7–5 to 2–1 victory in a replay against Dublin. The subsequent All-Ireland final on 2 November 1913 saw Kilkenny square up to Tipperary for the second time in five years in the first fifteen-a-side All-Ireland decider. Kilkenny led by 1–4 to 1–1 at half-time and eventually hung on to win on a score line of 2–4 to 1–2. This victory gave Kelly an impressive sixth All-Ireland medal.

== Honours ==
=== Team ===
Mooncoin

- Kilkenny Senior Hurling Championship (3): 1906, 1908, 1913

Kilkenny

- All-Ireland Senior Hurling Championship (6): 1905, 1907, 1909, 1911, 1912, 1913
- Leinster Senior Hurling Championship (7): 1904, 1905, 1907, 1909, 1911, 1912, 1913

Leinster

- Railway Shield (3): 1905, 1907, 1908
