= Jack Keoghan =

Irish hurler

Personal information
- Native name: Seán Mac Eochagáin (Irish)
- Born: 29 March 1897 Tullaroan, County Kilkenny, Ireland
- Died: May 1963 (aged 76) New York City, United States

Sport
- Sport: Hurling
- Position: Midfield
Club
- Years: Club
- 1902–1914: Tullaroan
Club titles
- Kilkenny titles: 3
Inter-county
- Years: County
- 1907–1914: Kilkenny
Inter-county titles
- Leinster titles: 5
- All-Irelands: 5

Jack Keoghan (29 March 1887 – May 1963) was an Irish hurler. His championship career with the Kilkenny senior team lasted eight seasons from 1907 to 1914.

Born in Tullaroan, County Kilkenny, Keoghan was just fifteen years old when he joined the Tullaroan senior team in 1902. Over the course of the following twelve years he won three county championship medals.

Keoghan made his debut on the inter-county scene when he was selected for the Kilkenny senior team for the 1907 championship. As a regular member of the team over the next eight seasons he won five All-Ireland medals, beginning with triumphs in 1907 and 1909 and ending with three championships in-a-row from 1911 to 1913. Keoghan also won five Leinster medals. He played his last game for Kilkenny during the 1914 championship.

After emigrating to the United States, Keoghan took a prominent role in the affairs of the Gaelic Athletic Association there. He briefly returned to Ireland in 1928 when he was chosen on the United States team that played in the Tailteann Games.

== Honours ==
Tullaroan

- Kilkenny Senior Hurling Championship (3): 1907, 1910, 1911

Kilkenny

- All-Ireland Senior Hurling Championship (5): 1907, 1909, 1911, 1912. 1913
- Leinster Senior Hurling Championship (5): 1907, 1909, 1911, 1912. 1913
