= Andy Buckley (hurler) =

Irish hurler

Personal information
- Native name: Aindriú Ó Buachalla (Irish)
- Nickname: Dooric
- Born: 1884 Blackrock, County Cork, Ireland
- Died: Unknown
- Occupation: Quay labourer

Sport
- Sport: Hurling
- Position: Full-forward
Club
- Years: Club
- Blackrock
Club titles
- Cork titles: 6
Inter-county*
Years	County	Apps (scores)
1903-1914	Cork	21 (21-14)
Inter-county titles
- Munster titles: 2
- All-Irelands: 1
- *Inter County team apps and scores correct as of 18:50, 8 December 2014.

Andy "Dooric" Buckley (born 1884) was an Irish hurler who played as a full-forward for the Cork senior team.

Born in Blackrock, County Cork, Buckley first arrived on the inter-county scene at the age of twenty-one when he first linked up with the Cork senior team. He made his senior debut during the delayed 1903 championship. Buckley immediately became a regular member of the starting team, and won one All-Ireland medal and two Munster medals.

At club level, Buckley was a six-time championship medallist with Blackrock. He was one of the most prolific goal-scorers of his era, and scored upwards of 21 championship goals. Throughout his career, he made 21 championship appearances. He retired from senior inter-county hurling after the 1914 championship, however, he later returned as a member of the Cork junior team.

== Playing career ==
=== Club ===
Buckley made his senior debut with Blackrock as a seventeen-year-old in a 1-15 to 1-11 championship semi-final defeat by Redmonds on 20 October 1901.

Two years later he had established himself as a regular member of the team as "the Rockies" faced St. Finbarr's in the championship decider at Turner's Cross. Blackrock played with a strong wind in the first half and built up an eight-point advantage at the interval. "The Barr's" fought back in the second half, however, Blackrock went on to narrowly win the game by 2-8 to 1-10, with Buckley collecting a first championship medal.

Blackrock endured several disappointing campaigns over the next few years, before once again reaching the decider in 1908 with Midleton providing the opposition. Buckley was one of "the Rockies" goal scorers as they powered to a 4-11 to 2-3 victory.

Once again Blackrock failed to retain the title, however, they reached the championship decider again in 1910. Reigning champions Dungourney were bested by 6-3 to 3-1, with Buckley collecting a third championship medal.

Blackrock went on to dominate the championship over the next few years. A 3-2 to no score defeat of Aghabullogue in 1911 saw Buckley win a fourth championship medal as Blackrock retained the title for the first time in over ten years.

Buckley was captain of the team in 1912, as "the Rockies" aimed to secure a third successive title. The game once again turned into a rout as Redmonds were defeated by 4-2 to 0-1.

Blackrock received one of their sternest challenges yet in a championship decider in 1913, as Midleton sought to dethrone them. A narrow 3-3 to 2-3 victory gave Buckley a sixth and final championship medal. Blackrock's record of four-in-a-row stood for twenty-five years until it was bettered by Glen Rovers.

=== Inter-county ===
Buckley made his senior championship debut on 4 September 1904 in Cork's 4-12 to 3-1 Munster semi-final defeat of Limerick. He missed the subsequent provincial decider, however, Buckley returned to the team in time for the All-Ireland decider with London on 12 November 1905. Cork were never troubled throughout the game, with Buckley collecting an All-Ireland medal following a 3-16 to 1-1 victory.

After missing the 1904 campaign, Buckley returned to the team the following year. He won his first Munster medal that year following a 7-12 to 1-4 trouncing of Limerick. The subsequent All-Ireland final on 14 April 1907 saw Kilkenny provide the opposition. The game was a high-scoring affair with Cork winning by 5-10 to 3-13. The game, however, had to be replayed as Cork goalkeeper Daniel McCarthy was a British army reservist and Kilkenny’s Matt Gargan had earlier played with Waterford in the Munster championship. The replay was another high-scoring one, with Jimmy Kelly scoring 5-2 for Kilkenny. A puck-out by Cork's Jamesy Kelleher is said to have bounced and hopped over the Kilkenny crossbar. Kilkenny won the game by 7-7 to 2-9, with all seven of their goals coming in a thirty-minute spell.

After being on and off the team over the next few years, Buckley was appointed captain for the opening championship game in 1912. He later collected a second Munster medal, as four goals by Jimmy "Major" Kennedy helped Cork to a 5-1 to 3-1 defeat of Tipperary in the provincial decider. Yet another All-Ireland final appearance beckoned, with Kilkenny providing the opposition on 17 November 1912. The game was an extremely close affair with Sim Walton proving himself to be the goal-scoring hero. A speculative Matt Gargan shot also hopped past the goalkeeper to give Kilkenny a narrow 2-1 to 1-3 victory. Buckley was an unused substitute during the game.

Buckley's last game for Cork was a 6-6 to no score All-Ireland semi-final defeat of Galway on 6 September 1914.

== Honours ==
=== Team ===
Blackrock

- Cork Senior Hurling Championship (6): 1903, 1908, 1910, 1911, 1912, 1913

Cork

- All-Ireland Senior Hurling Championship (1): 1903
- Munster Senior Hurling Championship (9): 1905, 1912
- All-Ireland Junior Hurling Championship (1): 1916

Sporting positions
Preceded by Tom Coughlan	Cork Senior Hurling Captain; 1912	Succeeded by Barry Murphy
