= Joe McLoughney =

Irish hurler

Personal information
- Native name: Seosamh Mac Lachtna (Irish)
- Born: 10 June 1887 Thurles, County Tipperary, Ireland
- Died: 13 January 1962 (aged 74) Thurles, County Tipperary, Ireland

Sport
- Sport: Hurling
Club
- Years: Club
- Thurles Blues
Club titles
- Tipperary titles: 5
Inter-county
- Years: County
- 1906-1913: Tipperary
Inter-county titles
- Munster titles: 2
- All-Irelands: 1

Joseph McLoughney (10 June 1887 – 13 January 1962) was an Irish hurler who played for the Tipperary senior team.

Born in Thurles, County Tipperary, McLoughney first arrived on the inter-county scene when he first linked up with the Tipperary senior team. He made his senior debut during the 1906 championship. McLoughney went on to play a key role for the team over the next decade, and won one All-Ireland medal and two Munster medals. He was an All-Ireland runner-up on one occasion.

At club level McLoughney was a five-time championship medallist with Thurles.

His retirement came following the conclusion of the 1913 championship.

In retirement from playing McLoughney became involved in team management and coaching. He was a selector with the Tipperary senior team in 1924.

== Honours ==
=== Team ===
Thurles

- Tipperary Senior Club Hurling Championship (5) 1906, 1907, 1908, 1909, 1911

Tipperary

- All-Ireland Senior Hurling Championship (1): 1908
- Munster Senior Hurling Championship (2): 1908, 1909
