= Patrick Maher =

Patrick Maher may refer to:

- Pádraic Maher (born 1989), Irish hurler
- Pat Maher "Fox" (1872–1933), Irish hurler
- Patrick Maher (hurler) (born 1989), Irish hurler
- Patrick Maher (Irish republican) (1889–1921), Irish Republican Army volunteer executed in Mountjoy Prison as one of the Forgotten Ten

== See also ==
- Patrick Meagher (disambiguation)
