= Tom McCormack (Erin's Own hurler) =

Irish hurler (1888–1959)

Personal information
- Native name: Tomás Mac Cormaic (Irish)
- Born: 31 January 1888 Castlecomer, County Kilkenny, Ireland
- Died: 2 September 1959 (aged 71) Portlaoise, County Laois, Ireland
- Occupation: Doctor

Sport
- Sport: Hurling
- Position: Right wing-forward
Club
- Years: Club
- Erin's Own
Club titles
- Kilkenny titles: 0
Inter-county
- Years: County
- 1909-1912: Kilkenny
Inter-county titles
- Leinster titles: 3
- All-Irelands: 3

Thomas Joseph McCormack (31 January 1888 – 2 September 1959) was an Irish hurler. Usually lining out as a half-back, he was a member of the Kilkenny team that won All-Ireland Championship titles in 1909, 1911 and 1912.

McCormack played his club hurling with Erin's Own, however, he enjoyed little success during his brief club career.

After being selected for the Kilkenny senior team in 1909, McCormack was a regular member of the team at various times over the following four championship seasons. He won his first Leinster medal in his debut season in 1909 before later winning his first All-Ireland medal after Kilkenny's defeat of Tipperary in the final. McCormack won further Leinster and All-Ireland medals in 1911 and 1912.

McCormack died on 2 September 1959.

== Honours ==
Kilkenny

- All-Ireland Senior Hurling Championship (3): 1909, 1911, 1912
- Leinster Senior Hurling Championship (3): 1909, 1911, 1912
