= Tom McCormick =

Thomas or Tom McCormick is the name of:

- Tom McCormick (American football) (1930–2012), American football player
- Tom McCormick (boxer) (1890–1916), British boxer
- Tom McCormick (politician) (1926–2022), American politician
- Thomas J. McCormick (1933–2020), American academic

== See also ==
- Tom McCormack (disambiguation)
