= Tom McCormack =

Tom McCormack may refer to:

- Tom McCormack (Erin's Own hurler) (1888–1959), Irish hurler for Kilkenny and Erin's Own
- Tom McCormack (James Stephens hurler) (born 1953), Irish hurler for Kilkenny and James Stephens
- Tom McCormack (footballer), New Zealand association footballer

== See also ==
- Tom McCormick (disambiguation)
