= Thomas McCormack =

Thomas McCormack may refer to:

- Thomas McCormack (California politician) (1873–1949), Canada-born California politician
- Thomas McCormack (artist) (1883–1973), New Zealand artist
- Tom McCormack (Erin's Own hurler) (1888–1959), Irish hurler for Kilkenny and Erin's Own
- Tom McCormack (footballer), New Zealand association footballer
- Thomas J. McCormack (1922–1998), member of the Pennsylvania State Senate and the Pennsylvania House of Representatives
- Thomas McCormack (writer) (1932–2024), author, playwright and former book-publishing executive
- Tom McCormack (James Stephens hurler) (born 1953), Irish hurler for Kilkenny and James Stephens
