= Connacht Senior Hurling Championship =

Hurling competition in Ireland

- Irish: Craobh Sinsir Iomána Connachta
- Code: Hurling
- Founded: 1900
- Abolished: 1999
- Region: Connacht (GAA)
- Trophy: M. J. "Inky" Flaherty Cup
- No. of teams: 0
- Last Title holders: Galway (25th title)
- First winner: Galway
- Most titles: Galway (25 titles)
- Official website: Official website

The Connacht Senior Hurling Championship, known simply as the Connacht Championship, was an annual inter-county hurling competition organised by the Connacht Council of the Gaelic Athletic Association (GAA). It was the highest inter-county hurling competition in the province of Connacht, and was contested almost every year between 1900 and 1922 before a revival in the 1990s.

The final served as the culmination of a series of games played during the summer months, and the results determined which team received the M. J. "Inky" Flaherty Cup. The championship was always played on a straight knockout basis whereby once a team lost they were eliminated from the championship.

The Connacht Championship was an integral part of the wider All-Ireland Senior Hurling Championship. The winners of the Connacht final, like their counterparts in the other provincial championships in Leinster, Munster and Ulster, advanced directly to the semi-final stage of the All-Ireland series of games.

The title was won at least once by three of the Connacht counties; however, only Galway won the title more than once. The all-time record-holders are Galway, who won the championship on 25 occasions.

As one of the weakest of the four provincial championships, the championship was suspended from 1923 to 1993, with Galway representing the province in the All-Ireland Championship. A brief revival in 1995 failed to reinvigorate hurling in the province and the Connacht Championship was abolished following the 1999 championship.

== History ==
=== Development ===
Following the foundation of the Gaelic Athletic Association in 1884, new rules for Gaelic football and hurling were drawn up and published in the United Irishman newspaper. In 1886, county committees began to be established, with several counties affiliating over the next few years. The GAA ran its inaugural All-Ireland Senior Hurling Championship in 1887. The decision to establish that first championship was influenced by several factors. Firstly, inter-club contests in 1885 and 1886 were wildly popular and began to draw huge crowds. Clubs started to travel across the country to play against each other and these matches generated intense interest as the newspapers began to speculate which teams might be considered the best in the country. Secondly, although the number of clubs was growing, many were slow to affiliate to the Association, leaving it short of money. Establishing a central championship held the prospect of enticing GAA clubs to process their affiliations, just as the establishment of the FA Cup had done much in the 1870s to promote the development of the Football Association in England. The championships were open to all affiliated clubs who would first compete in county-based competitions, to be run by local county committees. The winners of each county championship would then proceed to represent that county in the All-Ireland series. For the first and only time in its history the All-Ireland Championship used an open draw format. Six teams entered the first championship, however, this number increased to nine in 1888. Because of this, and in an effort to reduce travelling costs, the GAA decided to introduce provincial championships in Leinster and Munster. It was 1900 before a provincial championship was introduced in Connacht.

=== Beginnings ===
The inaugural Connacht Championship featured just two teams, with Galway and Sligo automatically qualifying for the final. Galway won the game by 4–2 to 1–2. Postponements, disqualifications, objections, withdrawals and walkovers were regular occurrences during the initial years of the championship.

=== Team changes ===
In spite of contesting the inaugural Connacht Championship in 1900, Sligo only fielded a team at senior level in one other occasion - 1913. Roscommon became the third team to join the championship when they did so in 1901. Over the next twenty years they became to closest challengers to the Galway hegemony. Mayo contested the championship for the first time in 1905 before making just two further appearances in 1909 and 1913. Leitrim were the only Connacht team never to field a team in the championship.

=== Suspension ===
From 1900 to 1922, Galway dominated the championship to such an extent that on only two occasions the championship title was won by a team other than Galway. After representing the province unopposed from 1917 to 1921, a significant defeat by Roscommon in the 1922 final lead to the championship being suspended. Because of this, Galway were the unopposed representatives of the province in the All-Ireland series from 1923 to 1993.

=== Revival and abolition ===
After a 70-year absence, the championship was revived in 1995 with Galway and Roscommon fielding teams. Both these teams contested the finals from 1995 to 1999; Galway were dominant, claiming all five championship titles with an average winning margin of 14 points. In May 2000, Roscommon announced that they were withdrawing from the championship, thus leading to its abolition.

== Format ==
The Connacht Senior Hurling Championship was run on a knock-out basis in which once a team loses they are eliminated from the competition. For the majority of the championship, there were only 2 teams competing. The championship was played during the summer months. The winner used progress directly to the All-Ireland semi-finals, while losing teams were eliminated after a single defeat.

== Teams ==
=== 1999 Championship ===
The championship was suspended after the completion of the 1999 Connacht Senior Hurling Championship. Two counties were scheduled to compete in 2000:

| County | Location | Stadium | "Position in 1999 Championship | Championship Titles | Last Championship Title |
|---|---|---|---|---|---|
| Galway | Salthill | Pearse Stadium | Champions | 25 | 1999 |
| Roscommon | Roscommon | Dr Hyde Park | Runners-up | 1 | 1913 |

== Trophy and medals ==
At the end of the Connacht final, the winning team was presented with a trophy. The M. J. "Inky" Flaherty Cup was held by the winning team until the following year's final. Traditionally, the presentation was made at a special rostrum in the stand where GAA and political dignitaries and special guests viewed the match.

The cup was decorated with ribbons in the colours of the winning team. During the game the cup actually had both teams' sets of ribbons attached and the runners-up ribbons are removed before the presentation. The winning captain accepted the cup on behalf of his team before giving a short speech. Individual members of the winning team then had an opportunity to come to the rostrum to lift the cup.

The cup was named after Michael John "Inky" Flaherty. He was a National Hurling League-winning captain with Galway in 1951, however, he never finished on the winning side in a championship game despite playing from 1936 until 1953.

In accordance with GAA rules, the Connacht Council awarded up to twenty-six gold medals to the winners of the Connacht final.

== Sponsorship ==
From 1995 to 1999, the Connacht Championship was sponsored. The sponsor was usually able to determine the championship's sponsorship name.

| Period | Sponsor | Name |
|---|---|---|
| 1900–1922 | No main sponsor | The Connacht Championship |
| 1995–1999 | (Republic of Ireland) Guinness | The Guinness Connacht Championship |

== List of finals ==
| Year | Date | Winner | | Runners-up | | Venue | Winning captain(s) | Winning margin | Referee |
| Year | Date | County | Score | County | Score | Venue | Winning captain(s) | Winning margin | Referee |
|---|---|---|---|---|---|---|---|---|---|
| 2009–present | No Championship | | | | | | | | |
| 2000–2008 | Galway represented the province in the All-Ireland Senior Hurling Championship | | | | | | | | |
| 1999 | 10 July | Galway | 4–26 | Roscommon | 2–08 | Dr Hyde Park | | 24 | J. McDonnell (Tipperary) |
| 1998 | 12 July | Galway | 2–27 | Roscommon | 3–13 | Dr Hyde Park | | 11 | P. Delaney (Laois) |
| 1997 | 13 July | Galway | 6–24 | Roscommon | 0–05 | Athleague | | 37 | Pat O'Connor (Limerick) |
| 1996 | 6 July | Galway | 3–19 | Roscommon | 2–10 | Dr Hyde Park | | 12 | Pat Horan (Offaly) |
| 1995 | 16 July | Galway | 2–21 | Roscommon | 2–12 | Dr Hyde Park | | 9 | P. Delaney (Laois) |
| 1979–1994 | Galway represented the province in the All-Ireland Senior Hurling Championship | | | | | | | | |
| 1959–1969 | No Championship | | | | | | | | |
| 1923–1958 | Galway represented the province in the All-Ireland Senior Hurling Championship | | | | | | | | |
| 1922 | | Galway | 12–08 | Roscommon | 1–00 | Ballygar | | | |
| 1918–1921 | Galway represented the province in the All-Ireland Senior Hurling Championship | | | | | | | | |
| 1916 | | Galway | 1–04 | Roscommon | 1–00 | | | | |
| 1916 | | Galway | 2–03 | Roscommon | 3–00 | | | | |
| 1915 | Galway represented the province in the All-Ireland Senior Hurling Championship | | | | | | | | |
| 1914 | | Galway | 5–01 | Roscommon | 2–01 | Roscommon | | | |
| 1913 | — | Roscommon | w/o | Mayo | scr. | — | — | — | — |
| 1912 | | Galway | 4–02 | Roscommon | 3–03 | | | | |
| 1911 | 8 October | Galway | 4–02 | Roscommon | 1–00 | Athlone | | | |
| 1910 | | Galway | 5–03 | Roscommon | 1–03 | | | | |
| 1909 | | Mayo | 10–01 | Galway | 4–01 | | | | |
| 1908 | | Galway | | Roscommon | | | | | |
| 1907 | | Galway | 3–05 | Roscommon | 1–02 | | | | |
| 1906 | — | Galway | w/o | Sligo | scr. | — | — | — | — |
| 1905 | | Galway | 3–15 | Mayo | 1–00 | | | | |
| 1904 | | Galway | 2–04 | Sligo | 0–02 | | | | |
| 1903 | | Galway | | Roscommon | | | | | |
| 1902 | | Galway | 0–05 | Roscommon | 0–03 | | | | |
| 1901 | | Galway | 4–10 | Roscommon | 2–00 | | | | |
| 1900 | | Galway | 4–02 | Sligo | 1–02 | | | | |
| 1897–1898 | Galway represented the province in the All-Ireland Senior Hurling Championship | | | | | | | | |

== Roll of honour ==
=== Performance by county ===
| County | Title(s) | Runners-up | Years won | Years runner-up |
|---|---|---|---|---|
| Galway | 20 | 1 | 1900, 1901, 1902, 1903, 1904, 1905, 1906, 1907, 1908, 1910, 1911, 1912, 1914, 1916, 1922, 1995, 1996, 1997, 1998, 1999 | 1909 |
| Roscommon | 1 | 16 | 1913 | 1901, 1902, 1903, 1907, 1908, 1910, 1911, 1912, 1914, 1916, 1922, 1995, 1996, 1997, 1998, 1999 |
| Mayo | 1 | 1 | 1909 | 1905, 1913 |
| Sligo | 0 | 3 | — | 1900, 1904, 1906 |

== Team records and statistics ==
=== Team results (since 1913) ===
Legend

- 1st – Champions
- 2nd – Runners-up
- — — did not compete

For each year, the number of teams (in brackets) are shown.

| Team | 1913 (4) | 1914 (2) | 1916 (2) | 1922 (2) | 1995 (2) | 1996 (2) | 1997 (2) | 1998 (2) | 1999 (2) | Years |
|---|---|---|---|---|---|---|---|---|---|---|
| Galway | SF | 1st | 1st | 1st | 1st | 1st | 1st | 1st | 1st | 9 |
| Mayo | 2nd | — | — | — | — | — | — | — | — | 1 |
| Roscommon | 1st | 2nd | 2nd | 2nd | 2nd | 2nd | 2nd | 2nd | 2nd | 9 |
| Sligo | SF | — | — | — | — | — | — | — | — | 1 |

=== Seasons in Connacht SHC ===
The number of years that each county has played in the Connacht SHC between 1888 and 2023. A total of 4 counties have competed in at least one season of the Connacht SHC. Galway have participated in the most championships. The counties in bold participate in the 2023 All-Ireland Senior Hurling Championship.

| Years | Counties |
|---|---|
| 27 | **Galway** |
| 19 | Roscommon |
| 3 | Mayo |
| 2 | Sligo |

=== Debut of counties ===
| Year | Debutants | Total |
|---|---|---|
| 1900 | Galway, Sligo | 2 |
| 1901 | Roscommon | 1 |
| 1902-04 | None | 0 |
| 1905 | Mayo | 1 |
| 1960- | None | 0 |
| **Total** | | **4** |

=== List of Connacht Senior Hurling Championship counties ===
The following teams have competed in the Connacht Championship for at least one season.

| Team | Appearances | Debut | Most recent | Championship titles | Last Championship title | Best Connacht result |
|---|---|---|---|---|---|---|
| Galway | 27 | 1900 | 1999 | 25 | 1999 | **Champions** |
| Mayo | 3 | 1905 | 1913 | 1 | 1909 | **Champions** |
| Roscommon | 19 | 1901 | 1999 | 1 | 1913 | **Champions** |
| Sligo | 2 | 1900 | 1913 | 0 | — | Runners-up |

==== Most recent pairings in the final ====
- Galway v Roscommon: 1999
- Mayo v Roscommon: 1913
- Galway v Mayo: 1909
- Galway v Sligo: 1906

=== All-time table (1995-) ===
Legend

Colours
Currently competing in the All-Ireland Senior Hurling Championship
Currently competing in the Nicky Rackard Cup

As of 11 June 2023 17:04.

| # | Team | Pld | W | D | L | Points |
|---|---|---|---|---|---|---|
| 1 | Galway | 5 | 5 | 0 | 0 | **10** |
| 2 | Roscommon | 5 | 0 | 0 | 5 | **0** |

=== By decade ===
The most successful team of each decade, judged by number of Connacht Senior Hurling Championship titles, is as follows:

- 1900s: 9 for Galway (1900, 01, 02, 03, 04, 05, 06, 07, 08)
- 1910s: 6 for Galway (1910, 11, 12 14, 16)
- 1920s: 1 for Galway (1922)
- 1990s: 5 for Galway (1995, 96, 97, 98, 99)

=== Match records ===
- Most matches played
  - Galway
- Most wins
  - Galway
- Most losses
  - Roscommon

=== Consecutive Wins ===
==== Nonuple ====
- Galway (1900, 1901, 1902, 1903, 1904, 1905, 1906, 1907, 1908)

==== Quintuple ====
- Galway (1995, 1996, 1997, 1998, 1999)

==== Treble ====
- Galway (1910, 1911, 1912)

==== Single ====
- Galway (1914, 1916, 1922)
- Mayo (1909)
- Roscommon (1913)

=== Other records ===
==== Finishing positions ====
- Most championships
  - 20, Galway (1900, 1901, 1902, 1903, 1904, 1905, 1906, 1907, 1908, 1910, 1911, 1912, 1914, 1916, 1922, 1995, 1996, 1997, 1998, 1999)
- Most second-place finishes
  - 16, Roscommon (1901, 1902, 1903, 1907, 1908, 1910, 1911, 1912, 1914, 1916, 1922, 1995, 1996, 1997, 1998, 1999)

==== Consecutive participations ====
- 2 counties have participated in all the editions of the All-Ireland since 1995. these counties are:
  - Galway
  - Roscommon

==== Winning other trophies ====
Although not an officially recognised achievement, only one team have achieved the distinction of winning the Connacht championship, the All-Ireland championship and the National Hurling League:

- Galway (1987)

==== Successful defending ====
Only one county has retained their title. These are:

- Galway on 14 attempts out of 20 (1901, 1902, 1903, 1904, 1905, 1906, 1907, 1908, 1911, 1912, 1996, 1997, 1998, 1999)
- Mayo on 0 attempts out of 1
- Roscommon on 0 attempts out of 1

==== Gaps ====
- Longest gaps between successive championship titles:
  - 73 years: Galway (1922–1995)
  - 6 years: Galway (1916–1922)
  - 2 years: Galway (1908–1910)
  - 2 years: Galway (1912–1914)
  - 2 years: Galway (1914–1916)
- Longest gaps between successive final appearances:
  - 73 years: Galway (1922–1995)
  - 73 years: Roscommon (1922–1995)
  - 6 years: Galway (1916–1922)
  - 6 years: Roscommon (1916–1922)
  - 4 years: Sligo (1900–1904)
  - 4 years: Roscommon (1903–1907)
  - 4 years: Mayo (1905–1909)
  - 4 years: Mayo (1909–1913)
  - 2 years: Sligo (1904–1906)
  - 2 years: Roscommon (1908–1910)
  - 2 years: Galway (1912–1914)
  - 2 years: Galway (1914–1916)
  - 2 years: Roscommon (1914–1916)
- Longest gap between successive championship appearances
  - 73 years: Galway (1922–1995)
  - 73 years: Roscommon (1922–1995)

==== Active gaps ====
- Longest active gaps since last championship title:
  - 115 years: Mayo (1909–)
  - 111 years: Roscommon (1913–)
  - 25 years: Galway (1999–)
- Longest active gaps since last final appearances:
  - 118 years: Sligo (1906–)
  - 111 years: Mayo (1913–)
  - 25 years: Galway (1999–)
  - 25 years: Roscommon (1999–)
- Longest active gap since last championship appearance:
  - 111 years: Mayo (1913–)
  - 111 years: Sligo (1913–)

==== Miscellaneous ====
- Best finish by a debuting team
  - Champions, Galway (1900)
- Best finish by a debuting team (after 1900)
  - Runners-up, Roscommon (1901)
  - Runners-up, Mayo (1905)
- Highest winning record in finals
  - 95%, Galway (20 wins in 21 matches)
- Lowest winning record in finals
  - 0%, Sligo (0 wins in 3 matches)
- Most played match
  - Galway v Roscommon

== See also ==
- All-Ireland Senior Hurling Championship
  - Leinster Senior Hurling Championship
  - Munster Senior Hurling Championship
  - Ulster Senior Hurling Championship
