= 1909 All-Ireland Senior Hurling Championship final =

1909 All-Ireland Senior Hurling Final
- Event: 1909 All-Ireland Senior Hurling Championship
Kilkenny	Tipperary
4-6	0-12
- Date: 12 December 1909
- Venue: Cork Athletic Grounds, Cork
- Referee: M. F. Crowe (Limerick)
- Attendance: 11,000

The 1909 All-Ireland Senior Hurling Championship Final was the 22nd All-Ireland Final and the culmination of the 1909 All-Ireland Senior Hurling Championship, an inter-county hurling tournament for the top teams in Ireland. The match was held at the Cork Athletic Grounds, Cork, on 12 December 1909 between Kilkenny, represented by a club side from Mooncoin, and Tipperary, represented by club side Thurles. The Munster champions lost to their Leinster opponents on a score line of 4–6 to 0–12.

This was Tipperary's first defeat in an All-Ireland final.

== Match details ==
1909-12-12

Kilkenny	4-6 – 0-12	Tipperary

Cork Athletic Grounds, Cork
Attendance: 11,000
Referee: M. F. Crowe (Limerick)
