= 1903 Kilkenny Senior Hurling Championship =

Annual hurling competition season

- Champions: Threecastles (2nd title); Ned Hennessy (captain)
- Runners-up: Kilmanagh

The 1903 Kilkenny Senior Hurling Championship was the 15th staging of the Kilkenny Senior Hurling Championship since its establishment by the Kilkenny County Board.

On 29 May 1904, Threecastles won the championship after a 2–10 to 0–05 defeat of Kilmanagh in the first final replay. This was their second championship title overall and their first title in five championship seasons.

== Results ==
=== Final ===
8 May 1904 Final	Threecastles	0-03 - 0-02	Kilmanagh	Tullaroan Gaelic Field

29 May 1904 Final replay	Threecastles	2-10 - 0-05	Kilmanagh	Asylum Road Grounds
