= 1898 Kilkenny Senior Hurling Championship =

Annual hurling competition season

- Champions: Threecastles (1st title); Ned Hennessy (captain)
- Runners-up: Confederation

The 1898 Kilkenny Senior Hurling Championship was the 10th staging of the Kilkenny Senior Hurling Championship since its establishment by the Kilkenny County Board.

Threecastles won the championship after a 4–01 to 2–03 defeat of Confederation in the final. This was their first championship title.
