= 1907 All-Ireland Senior Hurling Championship final =

1907 All-Ireland Senior Hurling Final
- Event: 1907 All-Ireland Senior Hurling Championship
Kilkenny	Cork
3-12	4-8
- Date: 21 June 1908
- Venue: Fraher Field, Dungarvan
- Referee: M. F. Crowe (Limerick)
- Attendance: 15,000

The 1907 All-Ireland Senior Hurling Championship Final was the 20th All-Ireland Final and the culmination of the 1907 All-Ireland Senior Hurling Championship, an inter-county hurling tournament for the top teams in Ireland. The match was held at Fraher Field, Dungarvan, on 21 June 1908, between Kilkenny, represented by a club side from Mooncoin, and Cork, represented by a club side from Dungourney. The Munster champions lost to their Leinster opponents on a scoreline of 3–12 to 4–8.

The game was regarded as the best All-Ireland decider up to that point.

== Match details ==
1908-06-21

Kilkenny	3-12 – 4-8	Cork

Fraher Field, Dungarvan
Attendance: 15,000
Referee: M. F. Crowe (Limerick)
