= Patrick Meagher =

Patrick Meagher may refer to:

- Patrick Meagher (hurler), Irish hurler
- Patrick Meagher (artist), American artist and art organizer
- Patrick Claiborne Meagher, member of the Mississippi House of Representatives
