= Patrick Meagher (hurler) =

Irish hurler (1890–1958)

Patrick "Wedger" Meagher
Personal information
- Native name: Pádraig Ó Meachair (Irish)
- Nickname: Wedger
- Born: 1890 Toomevara, County Tipperary, Ireland
- Died: 1958 (aged 67–68) New York City, United States
- Occupation: Journalist

Sport
- Sport: Hurling
- Position: Corner-back
Club
- Years: Club
- Toomevara
Club titles
- Tipperary titles: 6
Inter-county
- Years: County
- 1912-1919: Tipperary
Inter-county titles
- Munster titles: 1
- All-Irelands: 0

Patrick "Wedger" Meagher (1890-1958) was an Irish hurler who played as a corner-back for the Tipperary senior team.

Born in Toomevara, County Tipperary, Meagher first arrived on the inter-county scene at the age of twenty when he first linked up with the Tipperary junior team. He made his senior debut during the 1912 championship. Meagher went on to play a key part for Tipperary for a brief period, and won one Munster medal. He was an All-Ireland runner-up on one occasion.

At club level Meagher won six championship medals with Toomevara.

His retirement came following the conclusion of the 1919 championship.

In retirement from playing, Meagher became involved in team management and administrative affairs. He was a selector with the Tipperary senior team and served as secretary of the Tipperary County Board.

== Honours ==
=== Team ===
Toomevara

- Tipperary Senior Hurling Championship (6): 1910, 1912, 1913, 1914, 1919, 1923

Tipperary

- Munster Senior Hurling Championship (1): 1913
- Croke Cup (1): 1913

Sporting positions
Preceded by Hugh Shelly	Tipperary Senior Hurling Captain; 1913-1914	Succeeded by
