= Tom McCormick (politician) =

American politician (1926–2022)

Member of the New Hampshire House of Representatives from the Merrimack 32nd district
- In office 2002–2004

Personal details
- Born: Thomas Ferguson McCormick; January 2, 1926 Brooklyn, New York, U.S.
- Died: February 10, 2022 (aged 96) New London, New Hampshire, U.S.
- Party: Republican
- Education: Yale University; Brown University

Thomas Ferguson McCormick (January 2, 1926 – February 10, 2022) was an American politician. He served as a Republican member for the Merrimack 32nd district of the New Hampshire House of Representatives.

McCormick was born in Brooklyn on January 2, 1926. He went to Mepham High School in Bellmore, Nassau County. McCormick served in the United States Navy from 1944 to 1947. He went to Yale University and then graduated from Brown University. He worked in the insurance and electric typewriters businesses. McCormick lived with his wife in New Canaan, Connecticut, and then moved to New London, New Hampshire, in 1985. He was elected to the New Hampshire House of Representatives in 2002 as a Republican, and lost his re-election bid in 2004.

McCormick died on February 10, 2022, at the age of 96 at his home in New London, New Hampshire.
