= 1913 All-Ireland Junior Hurling Championship =

All Ireland Champions
- Winners: Tipperary (1st win)
- Captain: Jack Ryan

All Ireland Runners-up
- Runners-up: Kilkenny

Provincial Champions
- Munster: Tipperary
- Leinster: Kilkenny
- Ulster: Not Played
- Connacht: Not Played

The 1913 All-Ireland Junior Hurling Championship was the second staging of the All-Ireland Junior Championship since its establishment by the Gaelic Athletic Association in 1912.

Cork entered the championship as the defending champions.

The All-Ireland final was played on 1 February 1914 at Waterford Sportsfield, between Tipperary and Kilkenny, in what was their first ever championship meeting. Tipperary won the match by 2–02 to 0–00 to claim their first championship title.

== Results ==
=== All-Ireland Junior Hurling Championship ===
==== All-Ireland final ====
| 1 February 1914 Final | Tipperary | 2-02 - 0-00 | Kilkenny | Waterford Sportsfield |
