= Pat Maher =

Irish hurler (1872–1933)

Pat "Fox" Maher
Personal information
- Native name: Pádraig Ó Meachair (Irish)
- Nickname: Fox
- Born: 13 September 1872 Tullaroan, County Kilkenny, Ireland
- Died: 8 December 1933 (aged 61) Tullaroan, County Kilkenny, Ireland
- Occupation: Farmer

Sport
- Sport: Hurling
- Position: Goalkeeper
Clubs
- Years: Club
- Tullaroan; Johnstown
Club titles
- Kilkenny titles: 6
Inter-county
- Years: County
- 1893-1905: Kilkenny
Inter-county titles
- Leinster titles: 8
- All-Irelands: 1

Patrick "Fox" Maher (13 September 1872 – 8 December 1933) was an Irish hurler who played as a goalkeeper for the Kilkenny senior team.

Born in Tullaroan, County Kilkenny, Maher first played competitive hurling in his youth. He made his senior debut during the 1893 championship and became a regular player over the next decade. During that time Maher won one All-Ireland medal and eight Leinster medals. He was an All-Ireland runner-up on four occasions.

At club level Maher was a six-time championship medallist with Tullaroan and Johnstown.

Maher retired from inter-county hurling during the 1905 championship.

== Playing career ==
=== Club ===
In 1895 Maher was in goal as Tullaroan faced Threecastles in the senior championship decider. A narrow 1–4 to 1–2 victory gave him his first championship medal.

After missing Tullaroan's next championship triumph, Maher was back as goalkeeper when Tullaroan contested the 1899 final. Young Irelands provided the opposition, however, Maher collected a second championship medal following a 3–6 to 1–5 victory.

Tullaroan failed to retain the title the following year, however, in 1901 the team were back in the county decider once again. A high-scoring 5–10 to 3–7 defeat of Threecastles gave Maher a third championship medal.

Maher was appointed captain of the team in 1902, as Tullaroan reached yet another final. Mooncoin provided little opposition as Tullaroan powered to a 3–16 to 0–1 victory. It was Walsh's fourth championship medal.

Three-in-a-row proved beyond Tullaroan, however, they qualified for a third final in four seasons in 1904. Once again the game turned into a mismatch, as a 6–14 to 1–6 defeat of Piltown gave Maher a fifth championship medal.

In 1914 Maher was in the twilight of his career when he lined out his final championship decider, this time with Johnstown. A 3–1 to no score victory gave him his sixth and final championship medal.

=== Inter-county ===
Maher made his senior debut with Kilkenny during the 1893 championship campaign. He won his first Leinster medal that year as Kilkenny were granted a walkover by Dublin. On 22 June 1894 Kilkenny faced Cork for the very first time in an All-Ireland decider. After the original venue was unplayable the goalposts were uprooted and spectators and players alike moved to the Phoenix Park after a long delay. Cork, represented by Blackrock, gave an exhibition of hurling and led by 3–4 to 0–1 at the interval. Each side made exactly the same return in the second half to give Cork a 6–9 to 0–2 victory.

After surrendering their provincial crown in 1894, Maher collected a second Leinster medal the following year as Dublin were defeated by 1–5 to 0–5. Tipperary, represented by Tubberadora, faced Kilkenny in the delayed All-Ireland decider on 16 March 1896. In the first decider to take place at what would later be called Croke Park, Tipperary tore into Kilkenny. Paddy Riordan is said to have scored all but one point of Tipp's total. Mick Coogan captured Kilkenny's only score of the game, as Tipperary claimed a massive 6–8 to 1–0 victory.

Maher collected a third Leinster medal in 1897, as Kilkenny claimed the provincial title after receiving a walkover from Wexford. On 20 November 1898 Kilkenny faced Limerick in the All-Ireland decider, as both sides were hoping to win the title for the first time. "The Cats" got off to a great start and led by 2–4 to 1–1 at half-time. Limerick, however, powered on in the second half and used their new technique of hooking. They got two quick goals early in the half and scored the winning goal from a free after 52 minutes. At the final whistle Limerick emerged victorious by 3–4 to 2–4.

Kilkenny retained the provincial title for the first time in their history in 1898. A 4–12 to 3–2 defeat of Dublin gave Maher a fourth Leinster medal. On 25 March 1900 Kilkenny once again faced Tipperary in an All-Ireland final. "The Cats" dominated for the opening twenty-three minutes, however, controversy reigned over hand-passed scores which were awarded to Kilkenny in spite of being illegal at the time. Mikey Maher of Tipperary scored a second-half hat-trick to help Tipperary to a huge 7–13 to 3–10 victory.

Maher won a fifth Leinster medal in 1900 as Kilkenny narrowly defeated Dublin by 4–11 to 4–10.

In 1903 Maher picked up a sixth Leinster medal. The game against Dublin ended in a 1-5 apiece draw, however, Kilkenny were subsequently awarded the title by the Leinster Council. Maher's side later trounced Antrim before lining out against Cork in the All-Ireland home final which wasn't played until 11 July 1905. Cork's Andy "Dooric" Buckley scored at least six goals as Kilkenny were humiliated by 8–9 to 0–8.

Maher added a seventh Leinster medal to his collection in 1904 as Kilkenny recorded a 2–8 to 2–6 defeat of Dublin in the provincial decider. The subsequent All-Ireland final was delayed until 24 June 1906, with three-in-a-row hopefuls Cork providing the opposition. It was the beginning of a hugely successful era for "the Cats" as Cork were heading into decline. A first half goal by Dick Doyle put Kilkenny in the driving seat, while Maher made a great save in the dying moments of the game to help Kilkenny to a 1–9 to 1–8 victory. It was Maher's and Kilkenny's first All-Ireland triumph.

In 1905 Maher won an eighth and final Leinster medal as Dublin were once again bested by 2–8 to 2-2.

== Honours ==
=== Team ===
Tullaroan

- Kilkenny Senior Hurling Championship (5): 1895, 1899, 1901, 1902 (c), 1904

Johnstown

- Kilkenny Senior Hurling Championship (1): 1914

Kilkenny

- All-Ireland Senior Hurling Championship (1): 1904
- Leinster Senior Hurling Championship (8): 1893, 1895, 1897, 1898, 1900, 1903, 1904, 1905
