= Jack Anthony (hurler) =

Irish hurler

Personal information
- Native name: Seán Antaine (Irish)
- Born: 13 August 1885 Tramore, County Waterford, Ireland
- Died: 6 November 1964 (aged 79) Piltown, County Kilkenny, Ireland
- Occupation: Businessman

Sport
- Sport: Hurling
- Position: Midfield
Club
- Years: Club
- Piltown
Club titles
- Kilkenny titles: 0
Inter-county
- Years: County
- 1904-1907: Kilkenny
Inter-county titles
- Leinster titles: 3
- All-Irelands: 3

John Redmond Anthony (13 August 1885 – 6 November 1964) was an Irish hurler who played in numerous positions for the Kilkenny senior team.

Anthony made his first appearance for the team during the 1904 championship and was a regular member of the starting fifteen for the next three seasons until his retirement after the 1907 championship. During that time he won three All-Ireland medal and three Leinster medals.

== Honours ==
Kilkenny

- All-Ireland Senior Hurling Championship (3): 1904, 1905, 1907
- Leinster Senior Hurling Championship (3): 1904, 1905, 1907
