= Jamesy Kelleher =

Irish hurler

Personal information
- Native name: Séamus Ó Céileachair (Irish)
- Nickname: Jamesy
- Born: 31 March 1878 Dungourney, County Cork, Ireland
- Died: 10 January 1943 (aged 64) Dungourney, County Cork, Ireland
- Occupation: Farmer
- Height: 5 ft 9 in (175 cm)

Sport
- Sport: Hurling
- Position: Full-back
Club
- Years: Club
- Dungourney
Club titles
- Cork titles: 3
Inter-county
Years	County	Apps (scores)
1900-1914	Cork	47 (0-00)
Inter-county titles
- Munster titles: 7
- All-Irelands: 2

Jamesy Kelleher (31 March 1878 – 10 January 1943) was an Irish hurler who played as a full-back for the Cork senior team.

Born in Dungourney, County Cork, Kelleher first arrived on the inter-county scene at the age of twenty-three when he first linked up with the Cork senior team. He made his senior debut during the 1900 championship. Kelleher immediately became a regular member of the starting team, and won two All-Ireland medals and seven Munster medals. He was an All-Ireland runner-up on four occasions.

At club level Kelleher was a three-time championship medallist with Dungourney.

Throughout his career Kelleher made 47 championship appearances. He retired from inter-county hurling following the conclusion of the 1914 championship.

Kelleher was posthumously honoured by being named in the right corner-back position on the Cork Hurling Team of the Century.

== Playing career ==
=== Club ===
Kelleher was just fourteen-years-old when he first played for Dungourney in 1892 and immediately became a regular member of the team.

After defeat by Redmonds in the 1900 championship decider, Kelleher was captain of the team two years later when they faced Shanballymore in the final. A 3-10 to 2-5 victory gave Kelleher, and his club, their first championship title.

In 1907 Kelleher was captain of the Dungourney team that faced Castletownroche in the county decider. A comprehensive 5-17 to 0-3 victory gave him a second championship medal.

Back-to-back titles eluded Dungourney once again, however, the club was back in the decider again in 1909. Sarsfield's provided little opposition as Dungourney powered to a 6-10 to 1-8 victory. It was Kelleher's third championship medal.

=== Inter-county ===
==== Beginnings ====
Kelleher made his senior championship debut on 3 November 1901 in a delayed 0-12 to 0-9 Munster semi-final defeat by Tipperary.

==== Early successes ====
The 1901 championship was also delayed due to organisational difficulties, however, Kelleher found himself to be a regular on the team. He was at centrefield that year as Cork defeated Clare by 3-10 to 2-6 in the provincial decider. It was his first Munster medal. On 2 August 1903 Cork faced London in what was the 1901 All-Ireland final. Kellher's side were the overwhelming favourites against a team of exiles which was made up of nine Cork men. A downpour made the underfoot conditions difficult as London settled better and Cork floundered. A goal for London with ten minutes left in the game sealed Cork's fate and Kelleher ended up on the losing side by 1-5 to 0-4.

Kelleher was captain of the Cork team for the 1902 championship. He added a second Munster medal to his collection following a 2-9 to 1-5 defeat of Limerick. On 11 September 1904 Cork faced London in the delayed 1902 All-Ireland decider, in what was also the official opening of the Cork Athletic Grounds. Cork made no mistake on this occasion, and powered to a 3-13 to 0-00 victory. It was Kelleher's first All-Ireland medal.

Cork made it a three-in-a-row of provincial titles in 1903. A 5-16 to 1-1 defeat of Waterford gave Kelleher a third successive Munster medal. On 12 November 1905 Cork faced London in the All-Ireland decider for the third successive year. Cork were well on top for the entire game and secured a 3-16 to 1-1 victory. It was Kelleher's second consecutive All-Ireland medal.

Kelleher won a fourth successive Munster medal in 1904 following a 3-10 to 3-4 defeat of Tipperary. The subsequent All-Ireland final was delayed until 24 June 1906, Kilkenny providing the opposition. It was the beginning of a hugely successful era for "the Cats" as Cork were heading into decline. A first half goal by Dick Doyle put Kilkenny in the driving seat, while goalkeeper Pat "Fox" Maher made a save in the dying moments of the game to help Kilkenny to a 1-9 to 1-8 victory.

In 1905 Cork set the all-time record by winning a fifth successive provincial title. The 7-12 to 1-4 trouncing of Limerick gave Kelleher his fifth Munster medal overall. The subsequent All-Ireland final on 14 April 1907 saw Kilkenny provide the opposition once again. The game was a high-scoring affair with Cork winning by 5-10 to 3-13. The game, however, had to be replayed as Cork goalkeeper Daniel McCarthy was a British army reservist and Kilkenny's Matt Gargan had earlier played with Waterford in the Munster championship. The replay was another high-scoring one, with Jimmy Kelly scoring 5-2 for Kilkenny. A puck-out by Kelleher is said to have bounced and hopped over the Kilkenny crossbar. Kilkenny won the game by 7-7 to 2-9, with all seven of their goals coming in a thirty-minute spell.

==== Decline ====
Six-in-a-row of provincial titles proved beyond Cork, however, the team bounced back in 1907 with Kelleher taking over as captain for a second time. A 1-6 to 1-4 defeat of Tipperary gave Kelleher a sixth Munster medal. On 21 June 1908 Cork faced Kilkenny in the All-Ireland decider for the third time in four years. A high-scoring, but close, game developed between these two rivals once again. As the game entered the final stage there was little to separate the two sides. Jimmy Kelly scored three first-half goals while Jack Anthony scored Kilkenny's winning point at the death. Cork went on two late goal hunts, however, the final score of 3-12 to 4-8 gave Kilkenny the win. The game became the benchmark by which all subsequent All-Ireland performances were judged.

Cork went through a period of transition over the next few years and it was 1912 before the team bounced back. A 5-1 to 3-1 defeat of Tipperary that year gave Kelleher a seventh and final Munster medal. On 17 November 1912 Cork were scheduled to face Kilkenny in the All-Ireland decider, however, Kelleher had to withdraw from the team due to injury. Kilkenny won the game by 2-1 to 1-3.

Kelleher retired from inter-county hurling following Cork's exit from the 1914 championship.

== Personal life ==
Kelleher was born in Clonmult near Dungourney, County Cork, the second of seven children of William and Johanna (née Cronin). After completing his education, he worked as a farmer and also bred and trained many first class horses and won several cross-country and steeplechase trophies. Kelleher married Ina Cronin in September 1927 and together they had one child, a daughter, Hannah, born in 1928. After the death of his first wife from salpingitis aged 33 in 1930, Kelleher married Bridget McCarthy in April 1935.

On 10 January 1943, Kelleher died from Weils Disease aged 64.

Sporting positions
Preceded by Paddy Cantillon	Cork Senior Hurling Captain; 1902	Succeeded by Steva Riordan
Preceded by Christy Young	Cork Senior Hurling Captain; 1907	Succeeded by Tom Coughlan
Achievements
Preceded by Jack Coughlan (London)	All-Ireland Senior Hurling Final winning captain 1902	Succeeded by Steva Riordan (Cork)
