= 1903 All-Ireland Senior Hurling Championship =

All-Ireland champions
- Winning team: Cork (6th win)
- Captain: Steva Riordan

All-Ireland Finalists
- Losing team: London
- Captain: Paddy King

Provincial champions
- Munster: Cork
- Leinster: Kilkenny
- Ulster: Antrim
- Connacht: Galway

Championship statistics
- All-Star Team: See here

The 1903 All-Ireland Senior Hurling Championship was the 17th staging of the All-Ireland Senior Hurling Championship, the Gaelic Athletic Association's premier inter-county hurling tournament.

Cork were the defending champions.

The All-Ireland final was played on 12 November 1905 at the Jones' Road Grounds in Dublin, between Cork and London, in what was their third consecutive meeting in the All-Ireland final. Cork won the match by 3–16 to 1–01 to claim their sixth All-Ireland title overall and a second consecutive title.

== Results ==
=== Connacht Senior Hurling Championship ===
Final

Galway	won – lost	Roscommon

=== Leinster Senior Hurling Championship ===
12 February 1905
Final

Kilkenny	1–05 – 1-05	Dublin

Kilkenny

Kilkenny made an objection against the Dublin goal, and were awarded the title without the need for a replay.

=== Munster Senior Hurling Championship ===
Final

Cork	5–16 – 1-01	Waterford

=== Ulster Senior Hurling Championship ===
31 October 1903
Final

Antrim	2–04 – 0-05	Donegal

Belfast

=== All-Ireland Senior Hurling Championship ===
7 May 1905
Semi-final

Cork	4–21 – 1-03	Galway

Markets Field, Limerick

18 June 1905
Semi-final

Kilkenny	6–29 – 3-02	Antrim

Jones's Road, Dublin

16 July 1905
Home final

Cork	8–09 – 0–8	Kilkenny

Fraher Field, Dungarvan

12 November 1905
Final

Cork	3–16 – 1-01	London

Jones's Road, Dublin

== Championship statistics ==
=== Miscellaneous ===
- Cork win their 6th All-Ireland title to draw level with Tipperary at the top of the all-time roll of honour.

== Sources ==
- Corry, Eoghan, The GAA Book of Lists (Hodder Headline Ireland, 2005).
- Donegan, Des, The Complete Handbook of Gaelic Games (DBA Publications Limited, 2005).
