= 1913 All-Ireland Senior Hurling Championship =

All-Ireland champions
- Winning team: Kilkenny (7th win)
- Captain: Dick 'Drug' Walsh

All-Ireland Finalists
- Losing team: Tipperary
- Captain: Patrick "Wedger" Meagher

Provincial champions
- Munster: Tipperary
- Leinster: Kilkenny
- Ulster: Not Played
- Connacht: Roscommon

Championship statistics
- All-Star Team: See here

The All-Ireland Senior Hurling Championship 1913 was the 27th series of the All-Ireland Senior Hurling Championship, Ireland's premier hurling knock-out competition. Kilkenny won the championship, beating Tipperary 2–4 to 1–2 in the final.

== Format ==
All-Ireland Championship

Quarter-final: (1 match) This was a lone match between the Leinster champions and Glasgow. One team was eliminated at this stage while the winning team advanced to the semi-finals.

Semi-finals: (2 matches) The winning team from the lone quarter-final join Lancashire and the Connacht and Munster representatives to make up the semi-final pairings. Two teams are eliminated at this stage while the two winning teams advance to the All-Ireland final.

Final: (1 match) The winners of the two semi-finals contest this game with the winners being declared All-Ireland champions.

== Teams ==
=== General information ===
Eighteen counties will compete in the All-Ireland Senior Hurling Championship: four teams in the Connacht Senior Hurling Championship, six teams in the Leinster Senior Hurling Championship, six teams in the Munster Senior Hurling Championship and two overseas teams.

County	Last provincial title	Last championship title	Position in 1912 Championship
Clare	1889	—	
Cork	1912	1903	
Dublin	1908	1889	
Galway	1912	—	
Glasgow	—	—	
Kerry	1891	1891	
Kilkenny	1912	1912	
Lancashire	—	—	
Laois	—	—	
Limerick	1911	1897	
Mayo	1909	—	
Offaly	—	—	
Roscommon	—	—	
Sligo	—	—	
Tipperary	1909	1908	
Waterford	—	—	
Westmeath	—	—	
Wexford	1910	1910	

== Provincial championships ==
=== Connacht Senior Hurling Championship ===
==== Bracket ====
Semi-finals; 10 / 17 August
Sligo	2–01, scr.
Mayo	1–04, w/o
Roscommon	3–04
Galway	3–02

Final
Mayo	scr.
Roscommon	w/o

==== Semi-finals ====
10 August Semi-final	Sligo	2–1 – 1–4	Mayo	Sligo

17 August Semi-final	Roscommon	3–4 – 3–2	Galway	Roscommon

Semi-final replay	Mayo	w/o – scr.	Sligo

==== Final ====
Final	Roscommon	w/o – scr.	Mayo

=== Leinster Senior Hurling Championship ===
==== Bracket ====
Quarter-finals; 15 June
Offaly	5–02
Westmeath	2–02
Dublin	5–05
Wexford	0–05

Semi-finals; 13 July
Laois	2–06
Kilkenny	8–03
Offaly	4–01
Dublin	6–06

Final; 24 August / 28 September
Kilkenny	1–00, 7–05
Dublin	0–03, 2–01

==== Quarter-finals ====
15 June Quarter-final	Offaly	5–2 – 2–2	Westmeath	Tullamore

15 June Quarter-final	Dublin	5–5 – 0–5	Wexford	Croke Park

==== Semi-finals ====
13 July Semi-final	Dublin	6–6 – 4–1	Offaly	Portlaoise
				Referee: H Boland

13 July Semi-final	Laois	2–6 – 8–3	Kilkenny	Portlaoise
				Referee: P Dunphy

==== Final ====
24 August Final	Kilkenny	1–0 – 0–3	Dublin	Wexford Park
				Referee: P Breen

28 September Final replay	Kilkenny	7–5 – 2–1	Dublin	Wexford Park
				Referee: B Tarrant

=== Munster Senior Hurling Championship ===
==== Quarter-finals ====
11 May Quarter-final	Kerry	2–2 – 7–1	Clare	Listowel

15 June Quarter-final	Waterford	2–2 – 6–0	Tipperary	Waterford

==== Semi-finals ====
13 July Semi-final	Cork	3–3 – 1–2	Limerick	Thurles Sportsfield

17 August Semi-final	Tipperary	3–2 – 2–0	Clare	Markets Field

==== Final ====
21 September Final	Tipperary	8–1 – 5–3	Cork	Fraher Field

== All-Ireland Senior Hurling Championship ==
=== Bracket ===
Quarter-finals; 21 June
Glasgow	5–02
Kilkenny	10–06

Semi-finals; 4 August / 19 October
Lancashire	1–04
Kilkenny	4–04
Tipperary	10–01
Roscommon	1–01

All-Ireland final 2 November
Kilkenny	2–04
Tipperary	1–02

=== All-Ireland quarter-finals ===
21 June Quarter-final	Glasgow	5–2 – 10–6	Kilkenny	Celtic Park, Glasgow

=== All-Ireland semi-finals ===
4 August Semi-final	Kilkenny	4–4 – 1–4	Lancashire	Liverpool

19 October Semi-final	Tipperary	10–1 – 0–1	Roscommon	Croke Park
				Referee: MF Crowe (Limerick)

=== All-Ireland final ===
2 November Final	Kilkenny	2–4 – 1–2	Tipperary	Croke Park
				Attendance: 15,000; Referee: MF Crowe (Limerick)

== Championship statistics ==
=== Miscellaneous ===
- For the first time since the 1899 championship there are no representatives from the Ulster championship.
- Roscommon win the Connacht championship for the first and only time in their history.
- Kilkenny win their first three-in-a-row of All-Ireland titles.

== See also ==
- 1913 All-Ireland Junior Hurling Championship (Tier 2)

== Sources ==
- Corry, Eoghan, The GAA Book of Lists (Hodder Headline Ireland, 2005).
- Donegan, Des, The Complete Handbook of Gaelic Games (DBA Publications Limited, 2005).
