= Matt Gargan =

Irish hurler

Personal information
- Native name: Maitiú Ó Gargáin (Irish)
- Born: 30 September 1885 Kilkenny, Ireland
- Died: 10 March 1949 (aged 63) Kilkenny, Ireland
- Occupation: Stonecutter

Sport
- Sport: Hurling
- Position: Midfield
Club
- Years: Club
- Erin's Own
Club titles
- Kilkenny titles: 0
Inter-county
- Years: County
- 1905 1905-1917: Waterford; Kilkenny
Inter-county titles
- Leinster titles: 5
- All-Irelands: 5

Matthew Gargan (30 September 1885 – 10 March 1949) was an Irish hurler who played as a midfielder for the Kilkenny and Waterford senior teams.

Gargan made his first appearance for the Kilkenny team during the 1905 championship and was a regular member of the starting fifteen until his retirement after the 1917 championship. During that time he won five All-Ireland medals and five Leinster medals. He also frequently and illegally lined out with Waterford.

At club level Gargan enjoyed a lengthy career with Erin's Own.
