= Threecastles GAA =

GAA club in Kilkenny, Ireland

Threecastles
- Ban na nDuach
- Founded: 1887
- County: Kilkenny
- Colours: Green and yellow
- Grounds: Threecastles

Playing kits
Standard colours

Senior Club Championships
| | All Ireland | Leinster champions | Kilkenny champions |
|---|---|---|---|
| Hurling: | 0 | 0 | 2 |

Threecastles GAA is a Gaelic Athletic Association club located in County Kilkenny, Ireland. Threecastles play at the adult grade of junior A.

== Honours ==
- Kilkenny Senior Hurling Championship: 1898, 1903
- Kilkenny Junior Hurling Championship (1): 1940
- Kilkenny Junior B Hurling Championship (1): 2024
- Kilkenny Junior C Hurling Championship (1): 2023
