= Fraher Field =

Gaelic athletic stadium

- Páirc Uí Fhearachair
- Location within Ireland
- Former names: Dungarvan Gaelic Field (1885–1995)
- Location: Dungarvan, County Waterford, Ireland
- Coordinates: 52°5′48.06″N 7°37′25.09″W
- Owner: Waterford GAA
- Capacity: 15,000
- Surface: grass
- Public transit: Davitts Quay bus stop

Construction
- Opened: 1885
- Renovated: 1995

Fraher Field (Irish: Páirc Uí Fhearachair) is a GAA stadium, located in Dungarvan, County Waterford, owned by the Waterford GAA County Board. It has a total capacity of around 15,000.

== History ==
Dan Fraher (1852–1929), an Irish language activist and scholar and promoter of Gaelic games, leased the land in 1885 and bought it outright in 1912. The stadium was renamed in his honour in 1995.

With the obvious exception of Croke Park, Fraher Field has been the venue for more all-Ireland senior hurling finals than any other venue, having hosted the 1903, 1905, 1907 and 1911 deciders.

Various improvements have been made to the stadium since 1995, including the addition of a new stand on one side of the pitch, and the improvement of standing facilities in general. There are discussions about building a second stand on the other side of the pitch, although any action is likely to be put off for some time due to the likely refurbishment of Walsh Park in Waterford city. The two grounds are rivals for important games, former Waterford hurling manager Davy Fitzgerald saying "There's this endless battle between Walsh Park and Fraher Field, a political battle almost. If one field gets a game, the other has to get the next one. Dungarvan was a nice field, but my personal preference was always Walsh Park, because I felt it had more of the feel of a fortress."

== See also ==
- List of Gaelic Athletic Association stadiums
- List of stadiums in Ireland by capacity
- List of All-Ireland Senior Hurling Championship finals
