= 1911 All-Ireland Senior Hurling Championship =

All-Ireland champions
- Winning team: Kilkenny (5th win)
- Captain: Sim Walton

All-Ireland Finalists
- Losing team: Tipperary

Provincial champions
- Munster: Limerick
- Leinster: Kilkenny
- Ulster: Antrim
- Connacht: Galway

Championship statistics
- All-Star Team: See here

The All-Ireland Senior Hurling Championship 1911 was the 25th series of the All-Ireland Senior Hurling Championship, Ireland's premier hurling knock-out competition. Kilkenny won the championship, beating Tipperary 3–3 to 2–1 in a substitute final.

== Format ==
All-Ireland Championship

Semi-finals: (2 matches) The four provincial representatives made up the semi-final pairings. Two teams are eliminated at this stage while the two winning teams advance to the All-Ireland final.

Final: (1 match) The winners of the two semi-finals contest this game with the winners being declared All-Ireland champions.

== Results ==
=== Connacht Senior Hurling Championship ===
8 October 1911
Final

Galway	4–2 – 1–0	Roscommon

Athlone

=== Leinster Senior Hurling Championship ===
15 October 1911
Final

Kilkenny	4–6 – 3–1	Dublin

Portlaoise

=== Munster Senior Hurling Championship ===
Final

Limerick	5–3 – 4–3	Tipperary

=== All-Ireland Senior Hurling Championship ===
26 November 1911
Semi-Final

Kilkenny	5–5 – 1–1	Antrim

Jones’s Road, Dublin

3 December 1911
Semi-Final

Limerick	8–1 – 2–0	Galway

Portlaoise

18 February 1912
Final

Kilkenny	Cancelled	Limerick

Cork Athletic Grounds, Cork

12 May 1912
Refixed Final

Kilkenny	Cancelled	Limerick

Cork Athletic Grounds, Cork

28 July 1912
Substitute Final

Kilkenny	3–3 – 2–1	Tipperary

Fraher Field, Dungarvan

== Championship statistics ==
=== Results ===
- The All-Ireland final between Kilkenny and Limerick is never played. The original fixture was cancelled due to the state of the pitch at the Cork Athletic Grounds. The final was postponed until the 12 May, however, Limerick refused to play in that game. A substitute contest took place at Fraher Field on 28 July. The Munster Council nominated Tipperary to play Kilkenny, with the latter winning the game by 3-3 to 2-1.

== Sources ==
- Corry, Eoghan, The GAA Book of Lists (Hodder Headline Ireland, 2005).
- Donegan, Des, The Complete Handbook of Gaelic Games (DBA Publications Limited, 2005).
