= 1907 All-Ireland Senior Hurling Championship =

All-Ireland champions
- Winning team: Kilkenny (3rd win)
- Captain: Dick "Drug" Walsh

All-Ireland Finalists
- Losing team: Cork
- Captain: Jamesy Kelleher

Provincial champions
- Munster: Cork
- Leinster: Kilkenny
- Ulster: Antrim
- Connacht: Galway

Championship statistics
- All-Star Team: See here

The All-Ireland Senior Hurling Championship 1907 was the 21st series of the All-Ireland Senior Hurling Championship, Ireland's premier hurling knock-out competition. Kilkenny won the championship, beating Cork 3–12 to 4–8 in the final.

== Format ==
All-Ireland Championship

Semi-finals: (2 matches) The four provincial representatives made up the semi-final pairings. Two teams are eliminated at this stage while the two winning teams advance to the All-Ireland final.

Final: (1 match) The winners of the two semi-finals contest this game with the winners being declared All-Ireland champions.

== Results ==
=== Leinster Senior Hurling Championship ===
24 May 1908
Final

Kilkenny	4–14 – 1–9	Dublin

Athy

=== Munster Senior Hurling Championship ===
Final

Cork	1–6 – 1–4	Tipperary

=== Ulster Senior Hurling Championship ===
Semi-final

Antrim	0–9 – 0–0	Down

Final

Antrim	4–17 – 1–6	Derry

=== All-Ireland Senior Hurling Championship ===
15 March 1908
Semi-final

Dublin	5–10 – 2–5	Antrim

Dundalk

This semi-final was played before the Leinster championship had been decided. When Kilkenny beat Dublin in the Leinster final, they took Dublin's place in the All-Ireland final.

10 May 1908
Semi-final

Cork	2–8 – 1–7	Galway

Markets Field, Limerick

21 June 1908
Final

Kilkenny	3–12 – 4–8	Cork

Fraher Field, Dungarvan
Attendance: 15,000
Referee: M.F. Crowe (Limerick)

== Sources ==
- Corry, Eoghan, The GAA Book of Lists (Hodder Headline Ireland, 2005).
- Donegan, Des, The Complete Handbook of Gaelic Games (DBA Publications Limited, 2005).
- Fullam, Brendan, Captains of the Ash (Wolfhound Press, 2002).
