= 1904 All-Ireland Senior Hurling Championship =

Championship details
- Dates: 18 September - 24 June 1906

All-Ireland champions
- Winning team: Kilkenny (1st win)
- Captain: Jer Doheny

All-Ireland Finalists
- Losing team: Cork
- Captain: Dan Harrington

Provincial champions
- Munster: Cork
- Leinster: Kilkenny
- Ulster: Antrim
- Connacht: Galway

Championship statistics
- All-Star Team: See here

The All-Ireland Senior Hurling Championship 1904 was the 18th series of the All-Ireland Senior Hurling Championship, Ireland's premier hurling knock-out competition. Kilkenny won the championship, beating Cork 1–9 to 1–8 in the final.

== Format ==
All-Ireland Championship

Semi-final: (2 matches) The four provincial representatives make up the semi-final pairings. Two teams are eliminated at this stage while the two winning teams advance to the final.

Final: (1 match) The winners of the two semi-finals contest this game. The winners are declared All-Ireland champions.

== Results ==
=== Connacht Senior Hurling Championship ===
23 April 1905 Semi-final	Galway	0–10 – 1–2	Roscommon	Claremorris

23 April 1905 Final	Galway	2–4 – 0–2	Sligo	Claremorris

=== Leinster Senior Hurling Championship ===
15 April 1906 Semi-final	Kilkenny	3–11 – 1–4	Offaly	Portlaoise

6 May 1906 Semi-final	Wexford	1–6 – 4–8	Dublin	Enniscorthy
				Referee: J Tynan

10 June 1906 Final	Kilkenny	2–8 – 2–6	Dublin	Enniscorthy
				Referee: J Lacey

=== Munster Senior Hurling Championship ===
17 December 1905 Final	Tipperary	3–4 – 3–10	Cork	Fraher Field

=== Ulster Senior Hurling Championship ===
30 October 1904 Final	Antrim	2–4 – 0–5	Donegal

=== All-Ireland Senior Hurling Championship ===
6 May 1906 Semi-final	Cork	8–11 – 2–3	Antrim	Jones's Road

13 May 1906 Semi-final	Kilkenny	2–8 – 1–7	Galway	Athlone

24 June 1906 Final	Kilkenny	1–9 – 1–8	Cork	Carrick-on-Suir
				Attendance: 4,000

== Roll of Honour ==
- Cork – 6 (1903)
- Tipperary – 6 (1900)
- Kilkenny – 1 (1904)
- Limerick – 1 (1897)
- Dublin – 1 (1889)
- London – 1 (1901)
- Kerry – 1 (1891)

== Sources ==
- Corry, Eoghan, The GAA Book of Lists (Hodder Headline Ireland, 2005).
- Donegan, Des, The Complete Handbook of Gaelic Games (DBA Publications Limited, 2005).
