= 1909 All-Ireland Senior Hurling Championship =

All-Ireland champions
- Winning team: Kilkenny (4th win)
- Captain: Dick "Drug" Walsh

All-Ireland Finalists
- Losing team: Tipperary
- Captain: Tom Semple

Provincial champions
- Munster: Tipperary
- Leinster: Kilkenny
- Ulster: Antrim
- Connacht: Mayo

Championship statistics
- All-Star Team: See here

The All-Ireland Senior Hurling Championship 1909 was the 23rd series of the All-Ireland Senior Hurling Championship, Ireland's premier hurling knock-out competition. Kilkenny won the championship, beating Tipperary 4–6 to 0–12 in the final.

== Format ==
All-Ireland Championship

Semi-finals: (2 matches) The four provincial representatives made up the semi-final pairings. Two teams are eliminated at this stage while the two winning teams advance to the All-Ireland final.

Final: (1 match) The winners of the two semi-finals contest this game with the winners being declared All-Ireland champions.

== Results ==
=== Leinster Senior Hurling Championship ===
3 October 1909
Final

Kilkenny	5–16 – 2–7	Laois

Kilkenny

=== Munster Senior Hurling Championship ===
Final

Cork	2–6 – 2–10	Tipperary

=== All-Ireland Senior Hurling Championship ===
17 October
Semi-final

Tipperary	6–7 – 5–7	Mayo

Markets Field, Limerick

14 November
Semi-final

Kilkenny	3–17 – 0–3	Antrim

Jones's Road, Dublin

12 December
Final

Kilkenny	4–6 – 0–12	Tipperary

Cork Athletic Grounds, Cork

== Sources ==
- Corry, Eoghan, The GAA Book of Lists (Hodder Headline Ireland, 2005).
- Donegan, Des, The Complete Handbook of Gaelic Games (DBA Publications Limited, 2005).
