= 1905 All-Ireland Senior Hurling Championship =

All-Ireland champions
- Winning team: Kilkenny (2nd win)
- Captain: D. J. Stapleton

All-Ireland Finalists
- Losing team: Cork
- Captain: Christy Young

Provincial champions
- Munster: Cork
- Leinster: Kilkenny
- Ulster: Not Played
- Connacht: Galway

Championship statistics
- All-Star Team: See here

The All-Ireland Senior Hurling Championship 1905 was the 19th series of the All-Ireland Senior Hurling Championship, Ireland's premier hurling knock-out competition. Kilkenny won the championship, beating Cork 7–7 to 2–9 in a replay of the final.

== Format ==
All-Ireland Championship

Quarter-finals: (3 matches) These are two lone quarter-finals involving the Leinster and Ulster representatives and Glasgow and Lancashire. The provincial champions are on one side of the draw. Two teams are eliminated at this stage while the two winning teams advance to the All-Ireland semi-final.

Semi-finals: (2 matches) The winners of the two quarter-finals join the Munster and Connacht representatives to make up the semi-final pairings. Two teams are eliminated at this stage while the two winning teams advance to the All-Ireland final.

Final: (1 match) The winners of the two semi-finals contest this game with the winners being declared All-Ireland champions.

== Results ==
=== Connacht Senior Hurling Championship ===
Final

Galway	3–15 – 1–0	Mayo

=== Leinster Senior Hurling Championship ===
21 October 1906
Final

Kilkenny	2–8 – 2–2	Dublin

Wexford

=== Munster Senior Hurling Championship ===
Final

Cork	7–12 – 1–4	Limerick

=== Ulster Senior Hurling Championship ===
Final

Antrim	0–11 – 0–10	Down

=== All-Ireland Senior Hurling Championship ===
5 August 1906
Quarter-final

Kilkenny	2–21 – 0–5	Lancashire

Jones’s Road, Dublin

5 August 1906
Quarter-final

Antrim	3–13 – 3–11	Glasgow

Belfast

2 September 1906
Semi-final

Cork	5–13 – 0–4	Galway

Markets Field, Limerick

30 September 1906
Semi-final

Dublin	5–8 – 1–9	Antrim

Jones’s Road, Dublin

14 April 1907
Final

Cork	5–10 – 3–13	Kilkenny

Tipperary Park, Tipperary

15 June 1907
Final Replay

Kilkenny	7–7 – 2–9	Cork

Fraher Field, Dungarvan

== Sources ==
- Corry, Eoghan, The GAA Book of Lists (Hodder Headline Ireland, 2005).
- Donegan, Des, The Complete Handbook of Gaelic Games (DBA Publications Limited, 2005).
