= 1912 All-Ireland Senior Hurling Championship =

All-Ireland champions
- Winning team: Kilkenny (6th win)
- Captain: Sim Walton

All-Ireland Finalists
- Losing team: Cork
- Captain: Barry Murphy

Provincial champions
- Munster: Cork
- Leinster: Kilkenny
- Ulster: Antrim
- Connacht: Galway

Championship statistics
- All-Star Team: See here

The 1912 All-Ireland Senior Hurling Championship was the 26th staging of the All-Ireland hurling championship since its establishment by the Gaelic Athletic Association in 1887. The championship began on 19 May 1912 and ended on 17 November 1912.

Kilkenny were the defending champions, and successfully defended their title following a 2–1 to 1–3 defeat of Cork in the final.

== Format ==
All-Ireland Championship

Semi-finals: (2 matches) The four provincial representatives made up the semi-final pairings. Two teams are eliminated at this stage while the two winning teams advance to the All-Ireland final.

Final: (1 match) The winners of the two semi-finals contest this game with the winners being declared All-Ireland champions.

== Results ==
=== Leinster Senior Hurling Championship ===
16 June 1912 Semi-final	Laois	4–00 – 2–2	Dublin	Portlaoise Sportsfield
				Attendance: 7,000; Referee: H Boland

23 June 1912 Quarter-final	Wexford	4–6 – 2–3	Offaly	Jones's Road
				Referee: J Quigley

11 August 1912 Semi-final	Kilkenny	4–4 – 4–3	Wexford	Jones's Road
				Attendance: 7,000; Referee: H Boland

15 September 1912 Final	Laois	2–4 – 6–6	Kilkenny	Portaloise Sportsfield
				Attendance: 4,000; Referee: H Boland

=== Munster Senior Hurling Championship ===
19 May 1912 Quarter-final	Waterford	1–00 – 4–5	Limerick	Waterford Sportsfield

2 June 1912 Quarter-final	Cork	4–5 – 2–1	Kerry	Fermoy Sportsfield
				Referee: J McDonnell

18 August 1912 Semi-final	Clare	2–3 – 3–3	Tipperary	Ennis Sportsfield
				Referee: J McDonnell

1 September 1912 Semi-final	Cork	2–2 – 1–3	Limerick	Fraher Field
				Attendance: 10,000; Referee: J McDonnell

27 October 1912 Final	Cork	5–1 – 3–1	Tipperary	Fraher Field
				Attendance: 6,500; Referee: J McDonnell

=== All-Ireland Senior Hurling Championship ===
25 August 1912 Semi-final	Limerick	11–4 – 2–0	Antrim	Jones's Road
				Referee: J Grace

29 September 1912 Semi-final	Kilkenny	8–3 – 2–2	Galway	Jones’s Road
				Referee: M. F. Crowe

17 November 1912 Final	Kilkenny	2–1 – 1–3	Cork	Jones's Road
				Attendance: 20,000; Referee: M. F. Crowe

== Sources ==
- Corry, Eoghan, The GAA Book of Lists (Hodder Headline Ireland, 2005).
- Donegan, Des, The Complete Handbook of Gaelic Games (DBA Publications Limited, 2005).
- Fullam, Brendan, Captains of the Ash (Wolfhound Press, 2002).
