= Dublin–Limerick hurling rivalry =

Intranational sports team rivalry

Dublin-Limerick
- Location: County Dublin; County Limerick
- Teams: Dublin; Limerick
- First meeting: 4 March 1923; Limerick 8-5 - 3-2 Dublin; 1921 All-Ireland final
- Latest meeting: 21 June 2025; Dub. 2-24 - 0-28 Limer. 2025 All-Ireland Quarter-Final
- Next meeting: TBA

Statistics
- Total meetings: 8
- Top scorer: Dave Clohessy (6-2); Paul Ryan (0-20)
- All-time series: Championship: Limerick 5-2 Dublin (1 drawn game)
- Largest victory: 4 March 1923; Limerick 8-5 - 3-2 Dublin; 1921 All-Ireland final

The Dublin–Limerick rivalry is a hurling rivalry between Irish county teams Dublin and Limerick, who first played each other in 1923. The fixture has been an irregular one due to both teams playing in separate provinces. Dublin's home ground is Parnell Park and Limerick's home ground is the Gaelic Grounds, however, all bar one of their championship meetings have been held at neutral venues.

Both Dublin and Limerick have enjoyed sporadic periods of success at various stages throughout the history of the championship. The two teams have won a combined total of 13 All-Ireland Senior Hurling Championship titles.

As of 2015 Dublin and Limerick have met seven times in the hurling championship with Limerick holding the balance of power with four wins.

== History ==
=== 1921: Inaugural meeting ===
The very first championship meeting of Dublin and Limerick took place on 4 March 1923 in what was the delayed 1921 All-Ireland final. The opening ten minutes provided fast a competitive hurling as play swung from end to end. The Shannonsiders had the better of the first-half exchanges with captain Bob McConkey scoring a hat-trick of goals to give Limerick a commanding 4-1 to 0-2 lead. Dublin improved immediately after the restart with Mick Neville scoring a fine goal from a difficult angle. The Metropolitans later secured a second goal after a goal-mouth melee. Tommy Daly pulled off a great save for Dublin, however, McConkey was on hand to secure his fourth goal of the game and secure an 8-5 to 3-2 victory.

=== 1934: Limerick prevail after a replay ===
After an absence of over a decade, Dublin and Limerick met each other in the All-Ireland final on 2 September 1934. In the golden jubilee final, Dublin took the game to the league champions with points by Mick Daniels and a goal from Dan Canniffe. Limerick's Dave Clohessy and Dublin's Dinny O'Neill exchanged goals as the Shannonsiders took a slender 1-5 to 2-1 lead. Clohessy bagged 1-2 after the restart to stretch Limerick's lead to five. Dublin held Limerick scoreless for the remainder of the match as O'Neill added a second goal to his tally to secure a 3-4 to 2-7 victory.

The replay on 30 September 1934 saw Limerick line out without goalkeeper Paddy Scanlan who took ill on the eve of the game. A tense opening half saw Limerick score just once. Dave Clohessy's goal led to the sides finishing level at 1-0 to 0-3 at the interval. The game erupted immediately after the restart with four goals in as many minutes. Limerick's Mick Mackey and Dublin's Dinny O'Neill scored the openers before Clohessy pounced for his second. O'Neill responded with his second goal for Dublin to leave the sides level at 2-3 to 3-0. Dublin followed with some expertly taken points before Clohessy secured his hat-trick to tie the match once more at 4-0 to 2-6. Mackey scored Limerick's first point after 58 minutes before Clohessy rounded off a man of the match display with a fourth goal. The 5-2 to 2-6 victory secured Limerick's first All-Ireland title since their 1921 All-Ireland final defeat of Dublin.

=== 2006-2015: Renewed rivalry ===
After a 72-year hiatus Dublin and Limerick faced each other in the championship in an All-Ireland qualifier group stage game on 8 July 2006. Limerick took an early lead before Brian Begley fielded a Mark Foley delivery and kicked it to the Dublin net. The Dubs bounced back to close the gap to 1-6 to 1-9 by the interval as Kevin Flynn got onto a long ball and flashed it past the unsighted Brian Murray for his goal. Dublin were still very much in the hunt at 1-13 to 1-16, thanks to points from the excellent Liam Ryan and David Curtin, when Begley decided the tie with a crisply-hit shot at the death to secure a 2-16 to 1-13 victory.

On 26 July 2009 Dublin and Limerick faced off in an All-Ireland quarter-final. Dublin got off to a whirlwind start with a first-minute goal by Liam Rushe following a long-range free, which bounced in front of Limerick goalkeeper Brian Murray and Rushe got the vital touch. A glorious two-minute spell for Limerick saw Paudie McNamara make a great catch from Tomás Brady and McNamara raced through to beat Gary Maguire for Limerick's opening goal. Just on half time the game took a dramatic turn. As Paul Browne bore down on the Dublin goal, he was deemed to have been hauled down and the Limerick goalkeeper cracked the penalty to the net to make it level at the interval. Dublin also started the second half in style and had two points inside three minutes from Alan McCrabbe and Stephen Hiney. Limerick hit the front for the first time on the hour mark but fittingly, it was man of the match Gavin O'Mahony who turned the screw on Dublin with the last three points, a 65, a sideline and a free, to put an end to a gallant run by the Dubs and secured a 2-18 to 1-17 victory.

For the second time in three years, Dublin and Limerick met each other in an All-Ireland quarter-final on 24 July 2011. Ryan O'Dwyer struck the first blow for Dublin in the fifth minute, skipping past Tom Condon to slot home past Nicky Quaid. Eighteen-year-old Declan Hannon kept Limerick very much in touch with three splendid points from play, but the Treaty men suffered another setback in the 11th minute when O'Dwyer smashed home a second goal. The Limerick defence was badly stretched, and when Brian Geary coughed up possession, they conceded a third goal, O’Dwyer completing his hat-trick with a close range finish after Quaid had saved from "Dotsy" O'Callaghan. As a gripping contest entered its final ten minutes, just two points separated the sides. Limerick continued to create chances, but nine second half wides cost them dearly, while their opponents were much more efficient in their use of scoring opportunities. Late scores from O’Dwyer and substitute Shane Ryan secured a 3-13 to 0-18 victory and a first ever championship defeat of Limerick.

After exiting their respective provincial championships at the semi-final stages, Dublin and Limerick faced each other in a do-or-die qualifier meeting on 11 July 2015. A keen encounter was expected but Limerick showed better from the off and quickly moved nine points clear. Dublin eventually hit form and added five unanswered points to close the gap at the interval. Dublin kept up the pressure on the restart, where Paul Ryan and Liam Rushe impressed. "Dotsy" O'Callaghan pounced for Dublin's only goal after a defensive mix-up by Limerick. The final exchanges were tense, however, Dublin held out to win by 1-17 to 1-16.

== Statistics ==
Up to date as of 2023 season

| Team | All-Ireland | Provincial | National League | Total |
|---|---|---|---|---|
| Dublin | 6 | 24 | 3 | 33 |
| Limerick | 13 | 25 | 15 | 53 |
| Combined | 19 | 49 | 18 | 86 |

== All time results ==
=== Legend ===
| Dublin win |
| Limerick win |
| Draw |

=== Senior ===
| No. | Date | Winners | Score | Runners-up | Venue | Competition |
|---|---|---|---|---|---|---|
| 1. | 4 March 1923 | Limerick (1) | 8-5 - 3-2 | Dublin | Croke Park | All-Ireland final |
| 2. | 2 September 1934 | Limerick | 2-7 - 3-4 | Dublin | Croke Park | All-Ireland final |
| 3. | 30 September 1934 | Limerick (2) | 5-2 - 2-6 | Dublin | Croke Park | All-Ireland final replay |
| 4. | 8 July 2006 | Limerick (3) | 2-16 - 1-13 | Dublin | Gaelic Grounds | All-Ireland qualifier |
| 5. | 26 July 2009 | Limerick (4) | 2-18 - 1-17 | Dublin | Semple Stadium | All-Ireland quarter-final |
| 6. | 24 July 2011 | Dublin (1) | 3-13 - 0-18 | Limerick | Semple Stadium | All-Ireland quarter-final |
| 7. | 11 July 2015 | Dublin (2) | 1-17 - 1-16 | Limerick | Semple Stadium | All-Ireland qualifier |
| 8. | 21 June 2025 | Dublin (3) | 2-24 - 0-28 | Limerick | Croke Park | All-Ireland quarter-final |

=== Minor ===
| No. | Date | Winners | Score | Runners-up | Venue | Competition |
|---|---|---|---|---|---|---|
| 1. | 5 September 1965 | Dublin (1) | 4-10 - 2-7 | Limerick | Croke Park | All-Ireland final |
| 2. | 20 August 2005 | Limerick (1) | 0-15 - 0-12 | Dublin | Nowlan Park | All-Ireland semi-final |

== Records ==
=== Scorelines ===
- Biggest championship win:
  - For Dublin: Dublin 3-13 - 0-18 Limerick, 2011 All-Ireland quarter-final, Semple Stadium, 24 July 2011
  - For Limerick: Limerick 8-5 - 3-2 Kilkenny, 1921 All-Ireland final, Croke Park, 4 March 1923
- Highest aggregate:
  - Limerick 2-18 - 1-17 Dublin, 2009 All-Ireland quarter-final, Semple Stadium, 26 July 2009

=== Most appearances ===
| Team | Player | Championship games | Total |
|---|---|---|---|
| Dublin | Gary Maguire | 2006, 2009, 2011, 2015 | 4 |
| Dublin | John McCaffrey | 2006, 2009, 2011, 2015 | 4 |
| Limerick | Séamus Hickey | 2006, 2009, 2011, 2015 | 4 |
| Limerick | Donal O'Grady | 2006, 2009, 2011, 2015 | 4 |

=== Top scorers ===
| Team | Player | Score | Total |
|---|---|---|---|
| Dublin | Paul Ryan | 0-20 | 20 |
| Limerick | Dave Clohessy | 6-2 | 20 |

- Top scorer in a single game:
  - For Dublin: 1-11
    - Paul Ryan, Dublin 1-17 - 1-16 Limerick, 2015 All-Ireland qualifier, Semple Stadium, 11 July 2015
  - For Limerick: 4-0
    - Bob McConkey, Limerick 8-5 - 3-2 Dublin, All-Ireland final, Croke Park, 4 March 1923
    - Dave Clohessy, Limerick 5-2 - 2-6 Dublin, All-Ireland final replay, Croke Park, 30 September 1934
