= List of All-Ireland Senior Hurling Championship hat-tricks =

This is a list of players who have scored a hat-trick (i.e. three or more goals in a single game) in the All-Ireland Senior Hurling Championship.

Key

Scored in all-Ireland final
Scored in Defeat
Scored as a Substitute

Player	For	Against	Result	Date	Ref
P. J. Riordan	Tipperary	Kilkenny	6-8 : 1-0	15 March 1896	
Bob McConkey†	Limerick	Dublin	8-5 : 3-2	4 March 1923	
Leonard McGrath	Galway	Limerick	7-3 : 4-5	14 September 1924	
Michael Ahern	Cork	Galway	6-12 : 1-0	9 September 1928	
Dave Clohessy	Limerick	Dublin	5-2 : 2-6	30 September 1934	
John Keane	Waterford	Dublin	6-7 : 4-2	5 September 1948	
Patrick Lalor	Laois	Offaly	7-5 : 4-2	15 May 1949	
Nicky Rackard	Wexford	Tipperary	3-9 : 7-7	7 September 1951	
Jimmy Smyth	Clare	Limerick	10-8 : 1-1	14 June 1953	
Nicky Rackard	Wexford	Antrim	12-17 : 2-3	8 August 1954	
Nicky Rackard	Wexford	Galway	5-13 : 2-8	29 July 1956	
Tommy O'Connell	Kilkenny	Waterford	5-5 : 1-17	6 September 1959	
Séamus Power	Waterford	Kilkenny	6-8 : 4-17	1 September 1963	
Ritchie Browne	Cork	Galway	4-14 : 2-7	7 June 1964	
Donie Nealon	Tipperary	Kilkenny	5-13 : 2-8	6 September 1964	
Colm Sheehan	Cork	Kilkenny	3-9 : 1-10	4 September 1966	
Eddie O'Brien	Cork	Wexford	6-21 : 5-10	6 September 1970	
Eamonn Cregan	Limerick	Cork	4-5 : 3-15	1 August 1976	
Joe McKenna	Limerick	Tipperary	3-13 : 4-10	7 June 1981	
Joe McKenna	Limerick	Clare	3-12 : 2-9	5 July 1981	
Seánie O'Leary	Cork	Waterford	5-31 : 3-6	18 July 1982	
Joey Towell	Dublin	Laois	4-10 : 2-11	29 May 1983	
P. J. Cuddy	Laois	Offaly	4-9 : 1-23	22 June 1986	
Liam Fennelly	Kilkenny	Offaly	4-10 : 1-11	13 July 1986	
Noel Lane	Galway	Kerry	4-24 : 1-3	19 July 1986	
Jimmy Barry-Murphy	Cork	Antrim	7-11 : 1-24	10 August 1986	
Joe Hennessy	Kerry	Limerick	3-10 : 6-11	21 May 1989	
Pat Murphy	Waterford	Cork	5-16 : 4-17	19 June 1989	
Mark Corrigan	Offaly	Kilkenny	3-15 : 4-9	9 July 1989	
Noel Sands	Down	Derry	6-13 : 2-10	23 June 1991	
Noel Sands	Down	Derry	9-18 : 0-10	5 June 1992	
Paul Flynn	Waterford	Kerry	3-13 : 4-13	23 May 1993	
Michael Cleary	Tipperary	Kerry	4-21 : 2-9	6 June 1993	
Seán McLoughlin	Westmeath	Carlow	6-6 : 3-14	14 May 1995	
Billy Byrne	Wexford	Westmeath	6-23 : 1-7	4 June 1995	
Eamon Morrissey	Kilkenny	Dublin	4-13 : 2-10	25 June 1995	
Kevin Broderick	Galway	New York	4-22 : 0-8	20 July 1996	
Ger Ennis	Dublin	Westmeath	5-15 : 2-8	18 May 1997	
Alan Kerins	Galway	Roscommon	6-24 : 0-5	13 July 1997	
Liam Watson	Antrim	New York	5-19 : 2-11	26 May 2002	
Fergal Healy	Galway	Down	7-15 : 0-13	15 June 2002	
Brian McFall	Antrim	London	8-27 : 1-5	11 May 2003	
Paul Flynn	Waterford	Limerick	4-13 : 4-13	1 June 2003	
John Mullane	Waterford	Cork	3-12 : 3-16	29 June 2003	
Dan Shanahan	Waterford	Clare	3-21 : 1-8	16 May 2004	
Niall Healy	Galway	Kilkenny	5-18 : 4-18	21 August 2005	
Dan Shanahan	Waterford	Limerick	3-17 : 1-14	7 July 2007	
Joe Bergin	Offaly	Limerick	3-19 : 0-18	12 July 2008	
Niall Healy	Galway	Laois	5-29 : 0-17	31 May 2009	
Lar Corbett	Tipperary	Limerick	6-19 : 2-7	16 August 2009	
Lar Corbett	Tipperary	Kilkenny	4-18 : 1-17	5 September 2010	
Cyril Donnellan	Galway	Westmeath	4-17: 2-14	4 June 2011	
Patrick Horgan	Cork	Laois	10-20: 1-13	18 June 2011	
Paudie O'Sullivan	Cork	Laois	10-20: 1-13	18 June 2011	
Lar Corbett	Tipperary	Waterford	7-19: 0-19	10 July 2011	
Ryan O'Dwyer	Dublin	Limerick	3-13 : 0-18	24 July 2011	
Craig Doyle	Carlow	London	4-17 : 2-13	18 May 2013	
Shane O'Donnell	Clare	Cork	5-16 : 3-16	28 September 2013	
Séamus Callanan	Tipperary	Galway	3-25 : 4-13	5 July 2014	
Cathal Mannion	Galway	Dublin	5-19: 1-18	6 June 2015	
Ger Aylward	Kilkenny	Wexford	5-25: 0-16	21 June 2015	
Séamus Callanan	Tipperary	Galway	3-16 : 0-26	16 August 2015	
Aaron Shanagher	Clare	Laois	5-32: 0-12	2 July 2016	
John McGrath	Tipperary	Waterford	5-19 : 0-13	10 July 2016	
Patrick Purcell	Laois	Meath	3-25 : 2-13	30 April 2017	
Shane Dooley	Offaly	Westmeath	4-15 : 1-20	27 May 2017	
Séamus Callanan	Tipperary	Dublin	6-26 : 1-19	8 July 2017	
Patrick Horgan	Cork	Kilkenny	3-18 : 2-27	14 July 2019	
Conor Whelan	Galway	Westmeath	6-33 : 0-17	6 May 2023	
Eoin Cody	Kilkenny	Wexford	5-18 : 4-23	28 May 2023	
Mark Kehoe	Tipperary	Offaly	7-38 : 3-18	17 June 2023	
Tony Kelly	Clare	Dublin	5-26 : 2-17	24 June 2023	
Séamus Flanagan	Limerick	Cork	3-26 : 3-28	12 May 2024	
Alan Connolly	Cork	Tipperary	4-30 : 1-21	19 May 2024	
Alan Connolly	Cork	Dublin	7-26 : 2-21	5 July 2025	
Stephen Bennett	Waterford	Clare	4-21 : 2-33	19 April 2026	
Brian Hayes	Cork	Offaly	6-25 : 2-11	21 June 2026	

† 1921 All-Ireland Senior Hurling Championship Final
