= 1934 All-Ireland Senior Hurling Championship final =

1934 All-Ireland Senior Hurling Final
- Event: 1934 All-Ireland Senior Hurling Championship
Limerick	Dublin
2-7 5-2	3-4 2-6
- Date: 2 September 1934; 30 September 1934 (replay)
- Venue: Croke Park, Dublin
- Referee: Stephen Jordan (Galway)
- Attendance: 34,867; 30,250 (replay)

The first 1934 All-Ireland Senior Hurling Championship Final took place on 2 September 1934 at Croke Park, Dublin. It was the golden jubilee year of the Gaelic Athletic Association and the 47th All-Ireland final. It was contested by Limerick and Dublin. The match ended in a 2–7 to 3–4 draw. The replay took place at the same venue four weeks later on 30 September 1934. On that occasion the Leinster champions lost to their Munster opponents on a score line of 5–2 to 2–6.

== Match details ==
=== First game ===
1934-09-02
15:15 UTC+1

Limerick	2-7 – 3-4	Dublin

Croke Park, Dublin
Attendance: 34,867
Referee: S. Jordan (Galway)

Limerick	Dublin

=== Replay ===
1934-09-28
15:15 UTC+1

Limerick	5-2 – 2-6	Dublin

Croke Park, Dublin
Attendance: 30,250
Referee: S. Jordan (Galway)

Limerick	Dublin

== Teams ==
Dublin
(1) Chris Forde (goalie)
(2) Arthur Murphy (3) Joe Bannon (4) Tom Teehan
(5) James Andrew Walsh (hurler) (6) Dan Canniffe (7) Paddy Roche
(8) Ned Wade (9) Mick Daniels
(10) Stephen Hegarty (11) Tommie Treacy (12) Sylvester Muldowney
(13) Colm Boland (14) Dinny O'Neill (15) Jerry O'Connell
Subs: (16) M. Leahy (17) Cormack (18) J. Culleton (19) V. Ryan (20) Feeney (21) C. McMahon.

Limerick
(1) Paddy Scanlon (goalie)
(2) Ned Cregan (3)Tommy McCarthy (hurler) (4) M. Kennedy
(5) Micky Cross (6) Paddy Clohessy (7) Garrett Howard
(8) Timmy Ryan (9) M. Ryan
(10) John Mackey (hurler) (11) Mick Mackey (12) James Roche
(13) J. O'Connell (14) Dave Clohessy (15)J. Close
Subs: (16) D. Flanagan (17) A. Mackey (18) Mick Hickey (19) Bob McConkey (20) Chris. O'Brien (21) Michael Condon (22) Pat Ryan.

== See also ==
- 1934 All-Ireland Senior Hurling Championship
