= History of the All-Ireland Senior Hurling Championship =

The All-Ireland Senior Hurling Championship had many winners and losers located around Ireland.

When tracing the history of the Hurling Championship back to its beginning, it is possible to easily pick out periods when specific teams or counties dominated the competition, only to find themselves rapidly superseded by another dominant team or teams.

The format of the championship had also undergone several significant changes throughout the years, with the creation of the 'back-door system' in 1997.

== 1887–1888 ==
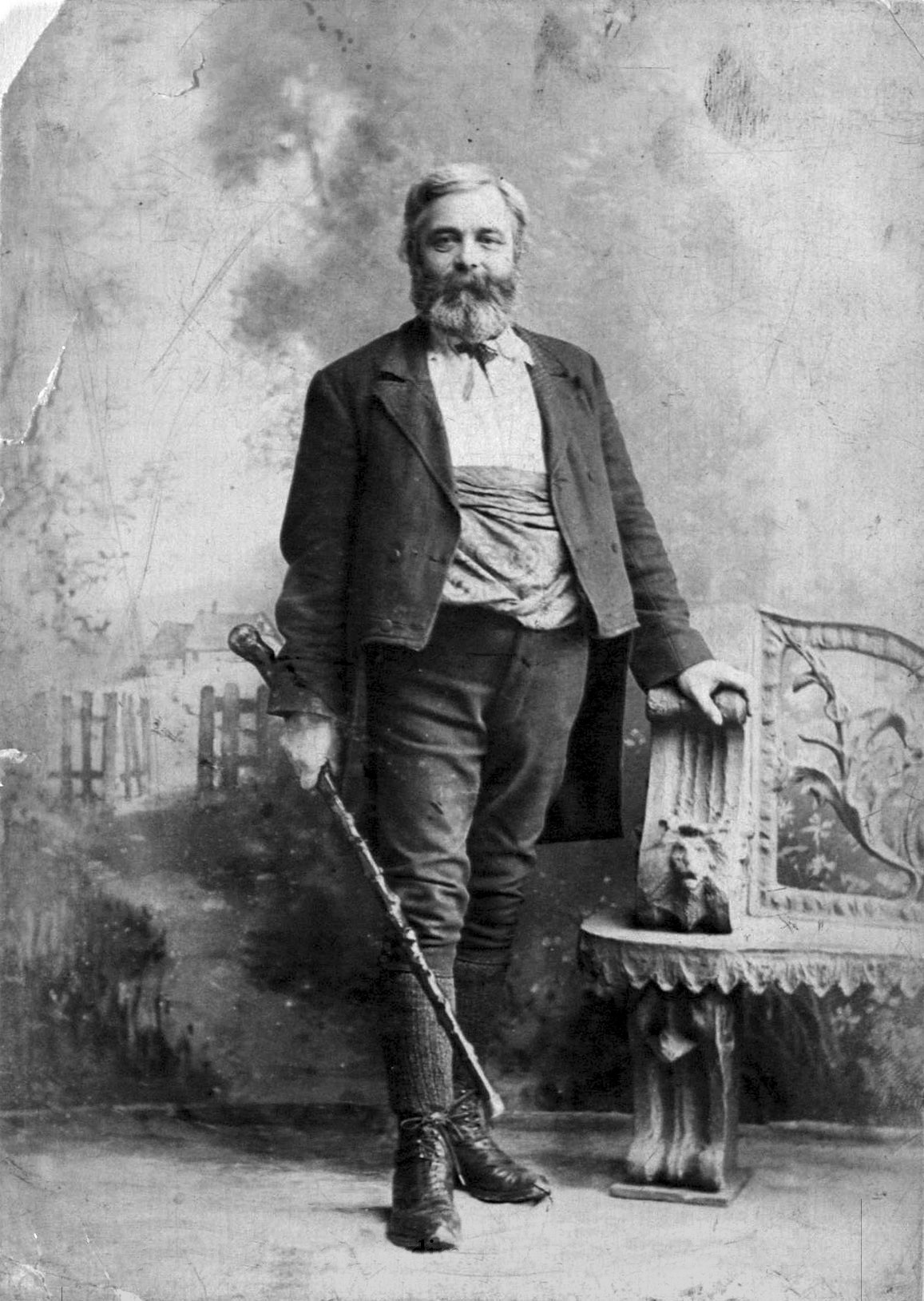
Michael Cusack; founder of the Gaelic Athletic Association.

The format of the first hurling championship was unique in that it was the only open draw All-Ireland championship ever-played. The five participating teams were paired off against each other regardless of their provincial locations. Three teams - Galway, Kilkenny and Wexford - advanced directly to the semi-final stages of the competition, while Clare and Tipperary met in a lone 'quarter-final.' Disputes in Cork and Limerick as to what club should represent the respective counties led to neither county participating.

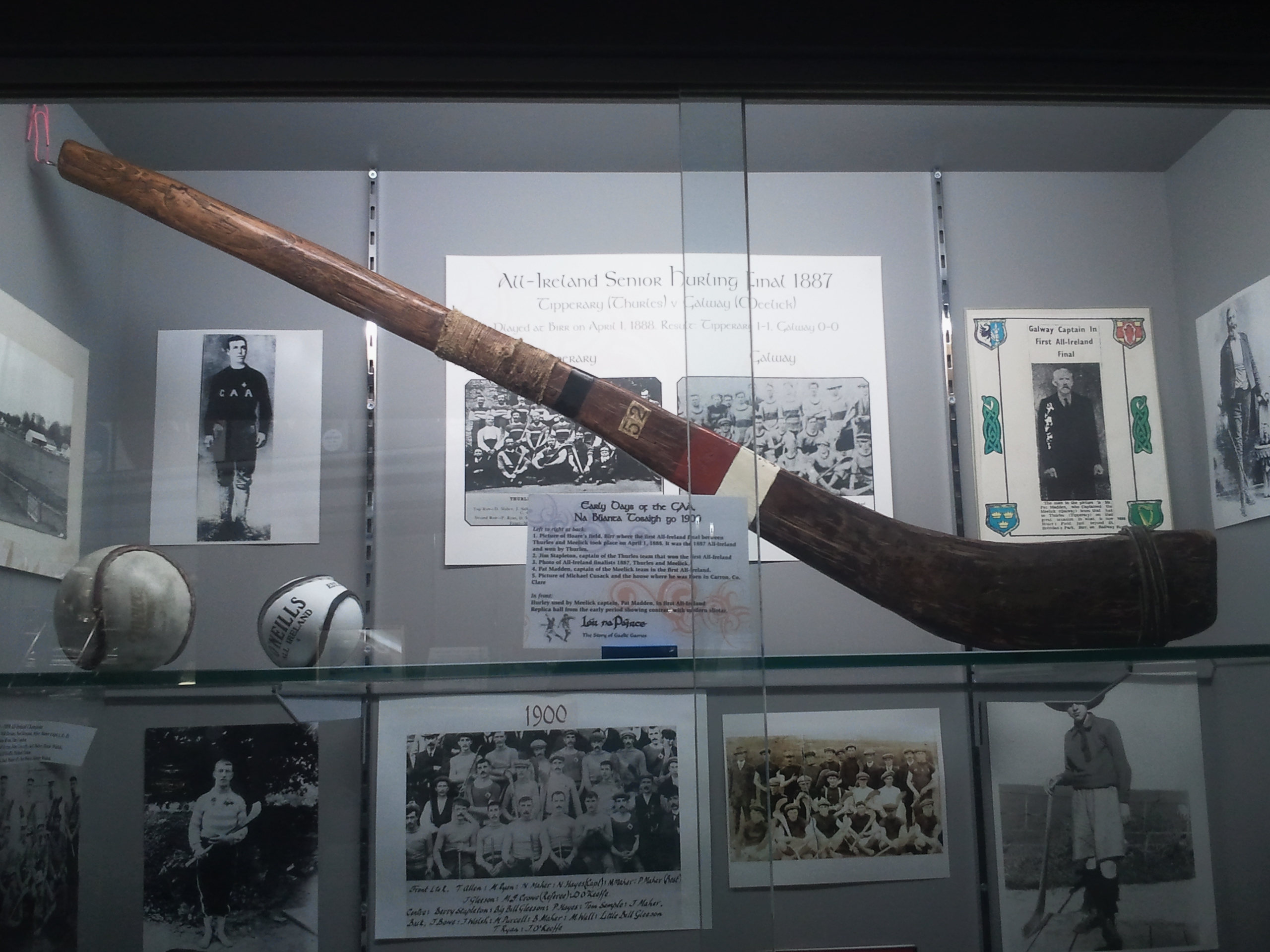
The hurley used by Meelick captain, Pat Madden, in the 1887 All-Ireland Final against Thurles.

The inaugural All-Ireland senior hurling final was played on Easter Sunday, 1 April 1888, in Birr, County Offaly. Tipperary and Galway were the opponents, with both sides vigorously contesting the game from start to finish. Early in the game one of the Thurles players received facial injuries when he fell on his hurley and had to retire from the game. In a sporting gesture of unrivalled magnitude Galway representatives Meelick withdrew one of their own players to level the teams. Thurles, the Tipp representatives, scored a point after eleven minutes and led by that score at half-time. With no number of points equaling a goal in those days the destination of the first All-Ireland hurling title was wide open. At a crucial stage in the second-half, Jim Stapleton lead a charge down the field. The Thurles captain spotted an opening and passed the ball to Tom Healy. Healy made no mistake in sending a low, hard drive to the back of the Galway net. The game ended shortly afterwards with Tipperary winning on a score line of 1 goal, 1 point and 1 forfeit point to Galway's no score.

The second ever championship in 1888 remains unfinished due to the so-called 'invasion' tour of the United States, which saw the infant GAA's organisational staff and 48 players go on a promotional tour of the United States. The tour was a failure and the All-Ireland was left unfinished with Kilkenny, Cork and Clare left in the tournament. Seventeen of the 'invaders' never returned to Ireland.

== 1889–1891 ==
In 1889 Clare won the first Munster final before taking on Dublin in the All-Ireland final. The Clare men, who played in their bare feet, took a 1–5 to 1–0 lead at the interval in atrocious weather conditions. W.J. Spain scored three goals for the metropolitans in the second half as Clare were held to a point. the 5–1 to 1–6 score line gave Dublin their first All-Ireland title and meant that goal-scoring hero Spain became the first dual All-Ireland winner as he won an All-Ireland football medal with Limerick in 1887.

In 1890 Cork and Wexford battled in the All-Ireland final. The game was a controversial one and was marred by ill-tempered behaviour. A Cork player had his toe broken by one of his Wexford counterparts. Cork captain Dan Lane walked his men off the field in protest. At the time Cork were trailing by 2–2 to 1–6; however, the GAA's Central Council later backed Cork and the team were awarded the All-Ireland title.

The 1891 championship saw the novelty of Kerry contesting the All-Ireland final with Wexford. The game itself was the second game of a triple-header played at Clonturk Park on 28 February 1892. The first game that day was the All-Ireland football semi-final between Dublin and Cavan. This was followed by the All-Ireland furling final and the programme of games finished with the All-Ireland football final between Cork and the winners of the first game. The hurling decider was an exciting affair with the Kerry team playing in their bare feet in grey jumpers with a gold band. Paddy 'Carr' Carroll scored Kerry's first point after five minutes with the team's second score coming after another twenty minutes. At half-time Kerry led by 0–2 to 0–1. The game, however, was not without controversy. At full-time the referee said that the score was 1-1 apiece and that extra-time was necessary. The Kerry team were reluctant to play the extra thirty minutes with captain John Mahony one of the most vocal opponents. It was only after being persuaded by the chairman of the Kerry County Board that the team decided to line out for a third half hour of hurling. Both sides upped their games considerably for the only occasion that extra time was played in an All-Ireland final. Kerry went on to win the game by 2–3 to 1–5 to capture their first and only All-Ireland hurling title.

== 1892–1894 ==
1892 saw Cork begin a three-year dominance of the championship. That year's All-Ireland final saw 'the Rebels' take on Dublin for the first time. The game turned into a controversial one as referee Dan Fraher changed his mind after initially awarding a goal to Cork. He eventually decided that the GAA's Central Council should decide the matter. Dublin, however, had walked off the field as some of the players had to return to work and, because of this, Cork were awarded the title.

Can you equal the Coughlans, the Ahernes, the Sheas,
Scannell, Cremin, Curtis and match Stephen Hayes
I can mention their names from the round of the clock
The men that won credit for Cork and Blackrock.

— The Boys of Blackrock.

Cork qualified for a third All-Ireland final in three seasons in 1893 and, they proved again that they were the hurling masters. The championship decider pitted Cork against Kilkenny. It was the first meeting of these two rivals in the history of the championship. The game was fixed for Ashtown; however, upon arrival both teams refused to play there as somebody had neglected to have the grass cut. After a long delay the goalposts were uprooted and both teams and their supporters headed to the Phoenix Park where the game took place after some delay. The game itself turned into a rout as Cork scored a huge tally of 6–8 to Kilkenny's 0–2. It was Cork's second All-Ireland title in-a-row.

The 1894 championship saw Cork retain their provincial title for the third consecutive occasion. The subsequent All-Ireland final pitted Cork against Dublin for the second time in three years. Cork showed their class and the game turned into a rout. A 5–20 to 2–0 score line gave another victory to Cork. The 29 point defeat of ‘the Dubs’ marks the game out as one of the most one-sided All-Ireland finals in history. It was a record-making third All-Ireland title in-a-row for Cork.

== 1895–1900 ==
Of the 100 All-Ireland captains I have seen,
for inspired leadership and dynamic force
in a crisis, I'll give the palm to Big Mikey of
Tubberadora.

— Journalist P. D. Mehigan chooses three-time
All-Ireland-winning captain Mikey Maher of
Tipperary as the best captain of his lifetime.

Had it not been for a slip up in 1897, it is not beyond the bounds of reality to surmise that Tipperary could have won a six All-Ireland titles in succession.

In 1895 the Tipp team stormed to the provincial title and into the All-Ireland final where Kilkenny were the opponents in the first championship decider to be played at what is now Croke Park. Tipp took a commanding 1–6 to 1–0 lead at half-time and went on to hammer "the Cats" by 6–8 to 1–10 at the final whistle. Tipperary's Paddy Riordan is said to have scored all but one point of his team's total.

Tipperary were the masters of the hurling world again in 1896. After securing a second consecutive Munster title the team lined out against Dublin in the All-Ireland final. Tipp scored a goal in the first minute and took a 4–6 to 0–1 lead at half-time. The game turned into a rout as Tipperary won easily by 8–14 to 0–4. This game still holds the record as the most one-sided All-Ireland final of all-time.

Tipperary surrendered their provincial crown to Limerick in 1897, who later faced Kilkenny in the All-Ireland final. Both sides were hoping to win the All-Ireland title for the first time. "The Cats" started and led by 2–4 to 1–1 at half-time. Limerick, however, powered on in the second half and used their new technique of hooking. They got two quick goals early in the half and scored the winning goal from a free after fifty-two minutes. At the final whistle Limerick emerged victorious by 3–4 to 2–4. It was Limerick's first All-Ireland title.

Tipperary reclaimed the provincial title in 1898 and qualified for an All-Ireland final showdown with Kilkenny. In an offensive showcase game with Kilkenny, Kilkenny had the higher score for the first twenty-five minutes. In the second-half Tipperary took the upper-hand with captain Mikey Maher scoring three goals. A 7–13 to 3–10 score line gave Tipperary this victory.

After retaining the provincial title in 1899 Tipperary subsequently advanced to the All-Ireland final where Wexford provided the opposition. Wexford held Tipp for the first fifteen minutes; however, the Munster men still took a 2–6 to 1–3 lead at half-time. Tipp went on the rampage in the second half and finished with a score of 3–12 to 1–4. The Wexford team walked off the field with ten minutes left in the game because they couldn't find a substitute for an injured player. Tipp were awarded the title.

In 1900 Tipperary trounced Kerry, Kilkenny and Galway to book a place in the All-Ireland final. A new innovation was introduced this year as London were permitted to take on the winners of the so-called 'home' final to decide the resting place of the All-Ireland title. This game was a close affair with both sides level at 0–5 with eight minutes to go. London then took the lead; however, they later conceded a free. Captain Mikey Maher stepped up, took the free and a forward ‘charge’ carried the sliotar over the line. Tipp scored another goal following a weak puck out and claimed the victory. It was Maher's fifth and final All-Ireland title by 2–6 to 0–6. It was a fifth All-Ireland title in six years.

== 1901–1903 ==
After a number of seasons out of the limelight Cork bounced back by capturing the Munster title in 1901. 'The Rebels' subsequently defeated Galway and Wexford to set up an All-Ireland final meeting with London. Cork were the overwhelming favourites against a team of exiles which was made up of nine Cork men. A downpour made the underfoot conditions difficult as London settled better and Cork floundered. A goal for London with ten minutes left in the game sealed Cork's fate and London by 1–5 to 0–4. It was the first time that the All-Ireland cup went overseas.

The Cork-London rematch took place in 1902, following Cork's victory over Dublin in the 'home' final. The game was played in Cork to mark the opening of the new Cork Athletic Grounds. After defeat in 1901 the Cork side made no mistake on this occasion and powered to a 3–13 to 0–0 victory. It was a huge triumph for Cork.

In 1903 Cork defeated Kilkenny in the All-Ireland 'home' final before doing battle with London for the third year in succession. Cork were well on top for the entire game and secured a merited 3–16 to 1–1 victory.

== 1904–1913 ==
1904 saw Kilkenny begin a hugely successful era as Cork were heading into decline. Both sides met in the final and 'the Cats' won the game thanks to Dick Doyle’s first-half goal, while Pat 'Fox' Maher made a save at the end to help his team to a 1-9 to 1-8 victory. It was Kilkenny's first All-Ireland title from five appearances in the championship decider.

In 1905, Kilkenny and Cork had another All-Ireland final showdown; a high-scoring match with Cork winning by 5-10 to 3-13. The game, however, had to be replayed as Cork goalkeeper Daniel McCarthy was a British army reservist and Kilkenny’s Matt Gargan had played with Waterford in the Munster championship. The game was another high-scoring one, with Jimmy Kelly scoring 5-2. A puck-out by Cork's Jamesy Kelleher is said to have hopped over the Kilkenny crossbar. Kilkenny won the game by 7-7 to 2-9, with all seven of their goals coming in a thirty-minute spell. It was Kilkenny's second All-Ireland title in succession.

In 1906 Tipperary played Dublin in the All-Ireland final for the first time in a decade. The game is notable for the quickest goal ever scored in a championship decider. Dublin’s Bill Leonard snatched a goal after just five seconds. This good start did not deter Tipperary, who won the game by 3-16 to 3-8. Ironically, eleven of the Dublin team hailed from Tipperary

1907 saw Kilkenny contest their third final in four years and, for the third time, it was Cork who provided the opposition. In one of the finals a high-scoring game was the order of the day. Jimmy Kelly scored a hat trick for ‘the Cats’ with Jack Anthony scoring the winning point with minutes left in the match. Cork went on two goal hunts immediately; however, a 3–12 to 4–8 victory gave Kilkenny a narrow one-point victory.

In 1908 Kilkenny were unable to defend their title as they withdrew from the championship due to a disagreement over custody of the Railway Shield. Because of this Dublin emerged from Leinster while Tipperary were the Munster champions. The All-Ireland final between these two sides was an exciting affair. Tipp were leading by 2–5 to 0-8 coming into the last passage of play when Harry Boland and Bill Leonard combined to score the equalizer. The replay took place in Athy; however, Tipperary were much too strong on the second meeting. Hugh Shelly and Tony Carew scored three goals between them to set Tipp on the way to a 3–15 to 1–5 victory.

In 1909 Kilkenny contested the championship after the difficulties of the previous year and reached the final again. Tipperary provided the opposition and went into the game with the distinction of never losing an All-Ireland final. An exciting game developed; however, it was Kilkenny's ability to get goals that proved the deciding factor. An opening goal by Jimmy Kelly was followed by three from Bill Hennerby. The final score of 4–6 to 0-12 gave Kilkenny a fourth All-Ireland title and subjected Tipp to a first championship decider defeat.

1910 saw the first ever championship meeting of Wexford and Limerick, as both sides contested the All-Ireland final. The introduction of new rules regarding the ‘parallelogram’ seemed to confuse players and officials. Limerick had a goal disallowed for this reason while Wexford's eighth goal was also ruled out for the same reason. The final was a close game; however, Wexford claimed their first title on a score line of 7–0 to 6–2.

In 1911 Kilkenny were back in the All-Ireland final after a one-year absence. Munster champions Limerick qualified to provide the opposition. On the day of the final Cork's lower park was water-logged and the game was rescheduled. Limerick were unable to line out in the replay. A meeting by the GAA's Central Council awarded the title to Kilkenny. ‘The Cats’ later defeated Tipperary in an alternative game to the All-Ireland final; however, Limerick defeated Kilkenny in a challenge game later in the year.

In 1912 Kilkenny reached a second consecutive championship decider. Cork were the opponents on this occasion and a close game developed. Sim Walton was the hero for ‘the Cats’ again as Kilkenny won their sixth All-Ireland title of the decade with a 2–1 to 1–3 score line.

In 1913 Kilkenny qualified for their third consecutive All-Ireland final and a record seventh appearance in ten championship seasons. Tipperary, the past masters of the competition, provided the opposition. In the first fifteen-a-side final Kilkenny took a 1–4 to 1–1 lead at half-time, courtesy of a Matt Gargan goal. Tipp only managed a single point in the second half as Sim Walton scored the deciding goal twelve minutes from the final whistle. The 2–4 to 1–2 victory gave Kilkenny a third All-Ireland title in-a-row and a seventh in ten years. Four players – Sim Walton, Jack Rochford, Dick ‘Drug’ Walsh and Dick Doyle – made history by winning a seventh All-Ireland winners’ medal.

== 1914–1915 ==
In 1914, Clare claimed the Munster title for the first time since 1889. In Leinster Laois also made the breakthrough and claimed their first provincial title. As a result, the All-Ireland final was a unique event. Clare's goal-scoring ability was the crucial deciding factor as Laois were outclassed. A score line of 5–1 to 1-0 gave Clare their first All-Ireland title. It would be 1995 before the ‘banner men’ won the title for a second time.

Laois made amends for their defeat the previous year be qualifying for a second championship decider in 1915. Cork provided the opposition and took a half-time lead of 3–0 to 2-2. A huge downpour resulted in the players donning their overcoats for the second half as Laois launched their comeback. With nine minutes to go Laois scored the winning goal, taking the title by 6–2 to 4–1. LIt was their first and their only All-Ireland title to date. Cork, on the other hand, had to wait until 2011 for the chance to avenge this defeat, which they beat Laois by 10–20 to 1–13 in the 2011 All-Ireland Qualifier

== 1916–1925 ==
In the ten years between 1916 and 1925 no team secured back-to-back All-Ireland titles. In fact, Kilkenny were the last team to achieve this feat in 1913 until Cork did likewise in 1929.

In 1916 Tipperary broke back after nearly a decade in the All-Ireland wilderness. Fierce rivals Kilkenny were the opponents in what proved to be a swansong for some of the players from their team of the previous decade. Both teams were reduced to fourteen players as Tipp trailed by five points; however, they came storming back to win by 5–4 to 3–2.

Tipperary reached the championship decider again in 1917, this time with Dublin providing the opposition. The metropolitans, a team which contained some players who hailed from Tipperary, gave the reigning champions a lesson in hurling. Joe Phelan scored a hat trick of goals to give Dublin a 5–4 to 4–2 victory and their first All-Ireland title of the twentieth century.

1918 saw two new teams come through the provincial series as Limerick and Wexford did battle in the All-Ireland final. Limerick were completely on top for the entire game at had a comfortable 5–4 to 0–2 lead at the interval. Willie Gleeson scored a hat trick as Limerick romped to a huge 9–5 to 1–3 victory. Like Dublin the year before, this was Limerick's first All-Ireland title of the twentieth century.

In 1919 the Cork and Dublin did battle for the championship. From a Cork perspective the game is significant as it was the first time that the players wore the now famous red jersey. Cork proved too good for the metropolitans and had a commanding 4–2 to 1–1 lead at the interval courtesy of four goals by Jimmy ‘Major’ Kennedy. Dublin could not stop the Cork onslaught as ‘the Rebels’ went on to secure a 6–4 to 2–4 victory and a first All-Ireland title in sixteen years.

The Cork-Dublin rematch took place in 1920. Dublin were out to avenge the defeat of the previous year and came out with all guns blazing. Joe Phelan went on the rampage and scored four goals in quick succession to give the metropolitans a merited 4–9 to 4–3 victory.

A third consecutive All-Ireland final appearance beckoned for Dublin in 1921; however, on this occasion it was Limerick, the champions of 1918, who provided the opposition. The reigning champions proved no match for the Munster men, with captain Bob McConkey scoring four goals to put his team in the driving seat. The final score of 8–5 to 3-2 gave Limerick a second All-Ireland title in four years. The 1921 championship marked the first occasion that the Liam MacCarthy Cup was presented to the winning captain.

In 1922 Tipperary and Kilkenny broke back into the championship decider. Tipperary looked set for their tenth All-Ireland victory when they took a three-point lead with as many minutes left. ‘The Cats’ fought back with two match-winning goals by Paddy Donoghue and Dick Tobin to secure a 4–2 to 2–6 victory. Kilkenny would not beat Tipperary in the championship again until 1967.

In 1923 the political realities of the era affected the championship. Galway and Limerick qualified for the All-Ireland final; however, Limerick refused to play the game until all Civil War prisoners were released. They were initially disqualified from the title awarded to Galway; however, the game eventually took place. Mick Gill’s new tactic of lobbing the sliotar into the square paid dividends as Galway scored seven goals over the hour. A 7-3 to 4-5 victory gave Galway an historic first All-Ireland title while it marked the end of the road for Limerick's team. Galway would not win another championship until 1980.

Galway had the chance to defend their title in 1924 when they played Dublin in the championship decider. Dublin came from behind thanks to a Garrett Howard goal to win the title by 5-3 to 2-6. Dublin’s non-playing captain Frank Wall became the only man to accept the Liam MacCarthy Cup without having played in the final.

A third consecutive All-Ireland final beckoned for Galway in 1925, this time with Tipperary providing the opposition. The Munster men opened their account with a goal, followed immediately by a second one. Galway never recovered and suffered a 5-6 to 1-5 defeat. It was Tipperary’s tenth All-Ireland title. The Tipp victory brought an end to over a decade of the All-Ireland title changing hands on an annual basis.

== 1926–1931 ==
After falling behind to Tipperary and Kilkenny in the all-time roll of honour over the previous two decades, Cork broke back in 1926 with a team that has been described as the county’s finest. After a three-game Munster final saga with reigning champions Tipperary, Cork qualified for an All-Ireland final showdown with Kilkenny. Trainer Jim ‘Tough’ Barry was at the Cork helm for the first, as snow covered Croke Park on the day of the game. The game was played on an even keel in the first-half with Cork leading by a point. ‘The Rebels' got ahead in the second half and won the day by 4–6 to 2–0.

In 1927 Cork were the provincial champions and headed for a second consecutive All-Ireland final, this time with Dublin providing the opposition. ‘The Dubs’ were well on top in the opening thirty minutes and took a 2–3 to 0–1 lead at the interval. Cork fought back in the third quarter; however, an expert display of goalkeeping by Tommy Daly saved the day as Dublin held on to win by 4–8 to 1–3.

1928 saw Cork regroup and, after retaining the Munster title, they qualified for another championship decider. Galway, who got a bye into the final without lifting a hurley, were the opposition on this occasion; however, the men from the west were no match as a rout ensued. A 6–12 to 1–0 score line tells its own story as Cork romped to a second All-Ireland in three years.

The Cork-Galway rematch took place in the All-Ireland of 1929. Little had changed in a year as Cork were on the top of their game again. A rout ensued as "the Rebels" claimed a third All-Ireland title from four final appearances with a 4–9 to 1–3 score line.

For the first time in five years Cork failed to retain their Munster title in 1929. Tipperary emerged from the province on that occasion and lined out against Dublin in the subsequent All-Ireland final. The game was finely balanced until the end of the first-half when goals by Martin Kennedy and J.J. Callanan gave Tipp the edge. The Munster men stormed ahead in the second period of play and won by 2–7 to 1–3. Tipperary completed a clean sweep of hurling titles that year, winning the senior, minor and junior All-Ireland titles. The victory also put Tipp on top of another all-time roll of honour.

Three times in all, Cork and Kilkenny clashed camáns
for the championship. Men say that the first replay
must stand as the classic final. Then in the third, as
the November evening drew to an early close, Cork
came out winners. Even to a Cork man it was
regrettable to see these Kilkenny lads being beaten -
a great pity.

— John Power, A Story of Champions (1941).

1931 proved to be a swansong for the great Cork team of the era. After regaining the provincial title Cork later lined out against Kilkenny in a classic All-Ireland final. After a close game both sides finished level – 1-6 apiece. Eudie Coughlan played a captain's role for Cork in that game as he scored a point from his knees to level the scores. The replay of the final took place four weeks later and is regarded as a classic. Cork took the lead at half-time; however, Kilkenny fought back. Both sides finished level – 2-5 apiece. After this game, officials pressed for extra time; however, the teams rejected this. It was also suggested at a meeting of the GAA's Central Council that both counties be declared joint champions and that half an All-Ireland medal by given to each player. This motion was later defeated. The first week of November saw the second replay of the All-Ireland final take place. At the third attempt a winner was found as Cork triumphed by 5–8 to 3–4. It was the county's fourth championship title in six years.

== 1932–1936 ==
In 1932, Clare won their first Munster title in almost twenty years. They later qualified for the All-Ireland final where Kilkenny, the defeated finalists of 1931, provided the opposition. The game was a close one that ebbed and flowed. Kilkenny scored three goals courtesy of Matty Power, Martin White and Lory Meagher direct from a line ball. Clare's Tull Considine replied with two goals himself and was foiled for an almost certain third. The final score of 3–3 to 2-3 gave victory to ‘the Cats’. It would be 1995 before Clare made their next appearance on All-Ireland final day.

1933 saw the Limerick team qualify for the championship decider. Kilkenny provided the opposition in what was their third consecutive appearance in the final. A then record crowd of 45,000 turned up at Croke Park with another 5,000 spectators being locked outside the stadium. The game was a close affair, only won with a Johnny Dunne goal for Kilkenny with ten minutes left. A score line of 1–7 to 0-6 gave Kilkenny a second consecutive All-Ireland title and left Limerick's hopes in tatters.

In 1934 Limerick retained their Munster dominance and qualified for a second consecutive All-Ireland final. Dublin, the newly crowned Leinster champions, provided the opposition. The game was an exciting affair, with veteran Bob McConkey being knocked unconscious twice. Dave Clohessy scored two goals, leaving Dublin trailing by five points with five minutes left. ‘The Dubs' came back to draw the game and force a replay. With two minutes to go the sides were level again. Limerick had scored 4–0 to Dublin's 2–6. Mick Mackey and Jackie O'Connell pointed for Limerick before Dave Clohessy struck again for his fourth goal of the game. The 5–2 to 2–6 score line gave Limerick the victory and an All-Ireland title.

1935 saw Limerick and Kilkenny do battle in another All-Ireland final. Limerick came into the match with an unbeaten run of thirty-one games and as the reigning champions. A downpour ruined the game for spectators as Kilkenny's Martin White scored atgoal to give 'the Cats' a five-point lead with time running out. Mick Mackey smashed a free into the net before Mickey Cross pointed; however, it was not enough. Kilkenny won their third All-Ireland of the decade by 2–5 to 2–4.

For the third time in four years Kilkenny and Limerick lined out to do battle on All-Ireland final day. Kilkenny had won the previous two encounters; however, Limerick's time was coming. Jackie Power scored two key goals for the Munster champs in the opening thirty minutes, taking the sting out of the Kilkenny attack. Three more goals followed in the second half as Limerick won by 5–6 to 1–5. It was their second championship title in three years.

== 1937–1940 ==
For the sixth time in seven years Kilkenny reached the All-Ireland final. Tipperary provided the opposition in their first outing in the championship decider since 1930. The game itself was played at FitzGerald Stadium in Killarney, due to the fact that the new Cusack Stand would not be finished in time at Croke Park. Tipperary surprised even themselves with a remarkable display in what proved to be the Lory Meagher's last game with ‘the Cats’. Kilkenny could only muster three points as Tipp scored 3–11 in a humiliating trouncing.

The 1938 championship decider was the first since 1930 not to feature either Limerick or Kilkenny. Waterford made history by winning their first Munster title ever. A subsequent defeat of Galway allowed them advance to the All-Ireland final. Dublin, the defeated finalists of four years earlier, provided the opposition. A goal by Declan Goode after just six minutes gave Waterford a dream start; however, Dublin's experience was the key. Goals by Mick Flynn and Bill Loughnane effectively nullified the Waterford attack and won the game for ‘the Dubs’. The 2–5 to 1–6 score line gave Dublin a sixth All-Ireland title in all. They have failed to win another since then.

The 1939 All-Ireland final between Cork and Kilkenny is regarded as one of the most famous championship deciders of all-time. Known as ‘the thunder and lightning’ final the match was played on the eve of World War II. Cork were looking for a first championship title since 1931, while Kilkenny were looking for a fourth All-Ireland title of the decade. The game was an exciting one with an explosive finish, as a spectacular thunderstorm lit up proceedings and doused spectators and players alike in the final period. Willie Campbell landed a long-range free in the net for an equalizing goal for Cork and a draw looked likely. Terry Leahy doubled on a Paddy Phelan 70-yard free to secure the winning point for Kilkenny. The 2–7 to 3–3 score line gave Kilkenny the victory and put them joint first with Kilkenny on the all-time roll of honour.

The 1940 All-Ireland final saw Limerick and Kilkenny, do battle for the final time. Kilkenny were the reigning champions as Limerick looked to be a spent force. It was this presumption that spurred on the Munster men. Paddy Scanlan was the goalkeeper from Ahane,(Paddy Healy was the Limerick Minor goalkepper that day, when the double was achieved) he obtained two gold medals. Early in the second half all was not going well as Limerick trailed by 1–6 to 1–2. Mick Mackey worked his magic again when he was moved to centre-forward. ‘The Cats’ only managed another point while Limerick scored two more goals. A 3–7 to 1–7 score line gave Limerick the victory and a third All-Ireland title inside seven seasons. The victory brought an end to the era of the greatest Limerick team of all-time, as it would be 1973 before Limerick won the championship again.

== 1941–1944 ==
Although not regarded as the greatest team of all-time, the Cork team of the 1940s has a record that proved elusive to other teams that came before. In winning four consecutive All-Ireland titles Cork set a benchmark in the championship that set them apart.

The four-in-a-row story began in 1941 with a bizarre twist to the championship. An outbreak of foot-and-mouth disease in some parts of Munster and south Leinster forced Tipperary and Kilkenny to withdraw from the championship. Because of this only Cork and Limerick participated in the Munster championship. Cork had hammered Limerick in the Munster semi-final and were nominated to be Munster's representatives in the All-Ireland final against Dublin. The game turned into a rout as Cork won the handiest championship ever by 5–11 to 0–6. The delayed Munster final took place in October with Tipperary beating Cork. For the first time ever a team were All-Ireland champions but were provincial runners-up.

The Cork-Dublin rematch took place in the 1942 All-Ireland final. This time the game was a lost closer with Cork only leading by 1–17 to 2–1 at half-time courtesy of a Johnny Quirke goal. Derry Beckett got a second for Cork just before the final whistle as Dublin missed several goal chances. The full-time score read Cork 2-14, Dublin 3–4.

In 1943 Cork again took the hurling world by storm and booked their place in a third consecutive All-Ireland final. History was made on that day as for the first time ever a team from Ulster provided the opposition. Antrim came to Croke Park with high expectations after defeating both Galway and Kilkenny on their way to the final. Unfortunately, a rout ensued. At half-time Cork had a 3–11 to 0–2 lead after dominating almost every aspect of the game. Cork had two more goals disallowed, just enough to keep them out of the record books. A further 2–5 in the second-half gave ‘the Rebels’ a 5–16 to 0–4 victory and a third consecutive All-Ireland title for the second time in their history.

In 1944 Cork set out to break all records by winning the championship for a fourth successive time. All went to plan as "the Rebels" qualified for another championship decider. For the third time in four years Dublin provided the opposition. The opening thirty minutes was a low-scoring affair; however, Cork still took a 0–8 to 0–2 lead. Cork forged ahead in the second-half with Joe Kelly scoring two goals to secure a 2–13 to 1–2 victory and a remarkable fourth All-Ireland title in succession.

== 1945–1948 ==
Five All-Ireland titles in-a-row proved beyond the Cork team of the era, as Tipperary emerged from the wilderness to book their place in the 1945 championship decider. In Leinster Kilkenny also emerged from the doldrums and provided the opposition in the final. Tipp raced into a stunning lead and left Kilkenny trailing by 4–3 to 0–3 at half-time. Three goals by ‘the Cats’ turned the tide; however, it wasn't enough as Tipperary won by 5–6 to 3–6.

In 1946 Cork proved that the four-in-a-row team was not finished yet. They booked their place in the All-Ireland final for the sixth time in nine years, this time with Kilkenny providing the opposition. The first half was played on an even keel; however, two goals in two minutes just before half-time gave Cork a boost. A solo-run goal by captain Christy Ring put ‘the Rebels’ four points ahead. Cork ran riot in the second-half, scoring five goals and winning easily by 7–5 to 3–8.

The Cork-Kilkenny rematch took place in the championship decider of 1947. The game itself is often described as the greatest All-Ireland final of them all. Jim Langton and Terry Leahy spearheaded the Kilkenny attack, while Mossy O'Riordan and Joe Kelly scored goals for Cork that nearly won the game. In the end Kilkenny won by the ‘usual point’ on a score line of 0–14 to 2–7, thus avoiding the ignominy of becoming the first team to lose three-in-a-row.

1948 saw two new teams contest the All-Ireland final in the forms of Waterford and Dublin. Both sides met in the championship decider a decade previously, with Dublin taking the spoils on that occasion. This game was different as Waterford took a nine-point lead at half-time courtesy of goals by John Keane and Willie Galvin. Four more goals followed for ‘the Déise’ in the second-half, as Waterford won comfortably by 6–7 to 4–2. It was their first All-Ireland title ever.

== 1949–1954 ==
By the late 1940s, Tipp had fallen on hard times. Over the course of the previous twenty years, the county had only won three All-Ireland titles.

Tipperary's fortunes changed in 1949 when ‘the premier county’ broke Cork's stranglehold on the championship. Tipp later annexed the Munster title and qualified for the All-Ireland final. Laois provided the opposition on that occasion; however, the game turned into a rout. Tipp opened the floodgates and secured an easy 3–11 to 0–3 victory.

In 1950 Tipperary were back in another All-Ireland final, this time with Kilkenny providing the opposition. The game was a dull affair; however, Tipp won the day by a single point.

The Tipperary dominance continued in 1951 with ‘the premier county’ reaching a third consecutive championship decider. An up-and-coming Wexford team were the opponents and a high-scoring game ensued. Nicky Rackard’s artistry was no match for Tipperary’s defence and a 7-7 to 3-9 score line gave Tipp a third consecutive All-Ireland title.

In 1952 Tipperary were again the favourites to retain the All-Ireland title, thus equaling the record of the nine – Cork’s seemingly unbeatable tally of four consecutive championships. A classic Munster final put an end to Tipp’s dream, as Cork were the ones who advanced to the All-Ireland final. Dublin provided the opposition; however, ‘the Rebels’ had an easy 2–14 to 0–7 victory.

An impressive Munster final defeat of Tipperary in 1953 meant Cork went into the subsequent All-Ireland final as red-hot favourites. Galway were there to stop them from retaining the title, and one of the dirtiest championship deciders of all-time followed. Cork won the day by 3–3 to 0–8.

In 1954 Cork got the better of Tipperary in another classic Munster final. The subsequent All-Ireland final saw the clash of Cork and Wexford. A record crowd of 84,000 people crammed into Croke Park, all anticipating a high-scoring game. The game was a close and tense affair, with Cork coming from four-points down to win by 1–9 to 1–6. It was a third consecutive All-Ireland title for Cork and a record eighth All-Ireland winners’ medal for Christy Ring.

== 1955–1956 ==
Terry Kelly on to Christy Ring.....Ring in front of
the goal is going through....he steadies himself
...he takes a shot...and it's blocked by Art Foley
....and it's cleared out by Art Foley....what a
great save there by Art Foley.

— Michael O'Hehir's commentary on Raidió Éireann
following Art Foley's great save from a Christy
Ring shot to deny Cork the 1956 All-Ireland title.

Wexford had been the All-Ireland runners-up on two occasions earlier in the decade. All changed in 1955 with "the yellowbellies" reaching a third final since 1951. Galway, who received a bye into the final without picking up a hurley, were the opponents. The men from the west proved no opposition as Wexford claimed a first title in forty-five years on a score line of 3–13 to 2–8.

In 1956 Wexford proved that their victory the previous year was not a fluke by reaching the championship decider again. A sterner test awaited them as Cork provided the opposition. In one of the most famous All-Ireland deciders of them all, Nicky Rackard bested Christy Ring to help his county to a 2–14 to 2–8 victory and an unprecedented second consecutive championship.

== 1957–1959 ==
The hurling world witnessed a shock in 1957 when Waterford emerged from Munster after a nine-year period in the wilderness. A series of unexpected victories saw the men from ‘the Deise’ qualify for the All-Ireland final against neighbours Kilkenny. Waterford nearly confounded the critics as they led by six points with three-quarters of the game played. Kilkenny fought back to win by 4–10 to 3-12, thus coming in from the wilderness themselves to claim a first championship since 1947.

In 1958 Waterford were unable to retain their provincial title as Tipperary fought back with one last kick by the great three-in-a-row team of the early part of the decade. Kilkenny also failed to retain their All-Ireland title as Tipp faced Galway in the championship decider. The men from the west received a bye into another final; however, it did little to revive the flagging fortunes of hurling in Connacht. Tipp got four goals against the wind in the first half to secure a 4–9 to 2–5 win. Following this defeat Galway retreated to the Munster championship, where they played for ten years.

Waterford were back in the championship decider again in 1959 and, for the second time in three years, Kilkenny were the opponents. The game saw ‘the Cats’ leak five easy goals, allowing their south-eastern neighbours to clinch a 1–17 to 5–5 draw. The replay took place a few weeks later, with Eddie Keher lining out in his first championship decider. That game was an exciting affair also, with Waterford securing a 3–12 to 1–10 victory. It was their second-ever All-Ireland title.

== 1960–1968 ==
The Tipperary team of the 1960s is regarded as one of the most successful and physically formidable teams of all time. They are also considered among the greatest teams in the history of the competition.

Of the nine All-Ireland finals to take place during this period Tipperary reached seven of them. In 1960 Tipperary were so confident of success that team manager Phil Purcell declared that:

...no player could mark Jimmy Doyle.

Purcell was forced to eat his words; however, having surprisingly lost out to Wexford in 1960 the premier county returned in 1961, taking on the first ‘native’ Dublin hurling team. A tempestuous affair saw Tipperary being put to the pin of their collars. A rout was expected; however, ‘the Dubs’ stood toe to toe with the past masters of the competition and eventually lost by just a single point.

In 1962 Tipperary secured a third consecutive Munster title and a safe passage into the All-Ireland final, this time taking on old rivals Wexford. Two goals for Tipp in the opening minute gave them a huge boost; however, the match wasn't settled until the final ten minutes when Tom Ryan scored a goal which meant Tipp won by 3–10 to 2-11.

In 1963 Tipperary's dream of three-in-a-row was shattered when Waterford emerged as provincial champions. It was the last kick of a dying team, with Kilkenny providing the opposition in the subsequent All-Ireland decider. It was their third meeting at this stage of the competition in seven years. The men from ‘the Deise’ were losing by eleven points at one stage; however, they managed to bridge the gap to just two by the final period of the game. In the end, however, the young Eddie Keher secured victory for ‘the Cats’ by finishing with a record tally of fourteen points.

Tipperary reclaimed the Munster title in 1964 and later lined out against red-hot favourites Kilkenny in the All-Ireland final. Kilkenny, however, faced a rejuvenated Tipp who scored five goals, the sixth one being disallowed. Tipp put their great rivals to the sword on a score line of 5–13 to 2-8 and were champions again.

Tipp asserted their dominance of the hurling world again in 1965, lining out against Wexford in the All-Ireland decider. The game failed to live up to expectations as Tipp won easily, courtesy of two unorthodox hand-passed goals and seven unanswered points in the last part of the game. It was a remarkable fourth All-Ireland title in five years and, had it not been for a blip in 1963, Tipperary could have reached the holy grail of five consecutive All-Ireland titles.

1966 saw a respite in the Tipperary dominance of the era with Cork and Kilkenny contesting their first All-Ireland final together since 1947. Furthermore, Cork were playing in their first final in a decade and fielded one of the youngest team's ever. There was even speculation that 45-year-old Christy Ring would be redrafted back onto the panel. In the final itself Cork defeated ‘the Cats’ by 3–9 to 1-10.

Kilkenny returned for a second consecutive final appearance in 1967, this time taking on a Tipperary team that was heading over the hill. A victory for ‘the Cats’ by 3–8 to 2-7 put an end to a 45-year Tipperary bogey for the Kilkenny hurlers.

In 1968 Tipperary contested their seventh All-Ireland final of the decade, having won four and lost two. Furthermore, it was their second consecutive final having lost to Kilkenny the previous year. Wexford provided the opposition for the fourth time that decade and a classic game of hurling ensued. Tipp led by eight points at half-time; however, Wexford fought back to set up a grandstand finish. At the long whistle Wexford triumphed by 5–8 to 3-12, thus bringing the curtain down on the greatest Tipperary team of all-time.

== 1969–1970 ==
In 1969 Cork and Kilkenny began their domination of the complementation that would last for the entire 1970s. Up until then Cork and Tipperary were considered the ‘hurling superpowers’, with Kilkenny being the distant cousin in Leinster. This all changed during the 1970s. In 1969 Kilkenny took on Cork in the All-Ireland final, a repeat of the 1966 clash. This time, however, the result was different with Kilkenny coming from behind to claim a 2–15 to 2–9 victory.

Cork returned in 1970, taking on Wexford in the first eighty-minute final. The game itself broke all kinds of records, with a hat-trick of goals by Cork's Eddie O'Brien contributing to an enormous 6–21 to 5–10 score line.

== 1971–1975 ==
While the sixties belonged to possibly the greatest Tipperary team of all-time, the early seventies were dominated by one of the greatest Kilkenny teams ever produced by the county.

In 1971 ‘the Cats’ reclaimed the Leinster title from Wexford and booked their place in the All-Ireland final. Fierce rivals Tipperary provided the opposition in one of the great All-Ireland finals of the decade. The game was notable as it was the first All-Ireland final to be broadcast in colour by Telefís Éireann. Tipperary relied on two freak goals to put them in the driving seat, one of which passed through Ollie Walsh’s legs. Kilkenny’s Eddie Keher surpassed his own record by scoring 2-11, in spite of ending up on the losing side. The game is also memorable for the fact that Michael ‘Babs’ Keating discarded his boots and socks and played out the last period of the game in his bare feet. The final score of 5–17 to 5-14 gave Tipperary a merited victory and allowed the team to go top of the all-time roll of honour. Furthermore, Tipp wouldn't win another All-Ireland title for eighteen years.

In 1972 Kilkenny had a chance to redeem themselves when they qualified for a second consecutive All-Ireland final. Cork provided the opposition on this occasion in the only eighty-minute decider between these two great rivals. Cork stormed into an early lead and looked set for victory. Kilkenny, however, fought back after being inspired by a Frank Cummins solo-run goal. After trailing by eight points at one stage ‘the Cats’ leveled the match, thanks in no small part to four great saves by Noel Skehan, and scored seven points without reply to win by 3–24 to 5-11.

Well, after a wait since nineteen hundred and
forty we have Limerick the All-Ireland champions,
the worthy All-Ireland champions after a truly
memorable game...shades of the past have come
to Croke Park today, as Limerick after so long
have won this title.

— Michael O'Hehir's commentary on RTÉ following
Limerick's triumph in the 1973 All-Ireland final.

1973 saw Kilkenny reach the championship decider for a third successive year with a third Munster team, Limerick, providing the opposition. ‘The Cats’ were severely hampered for a number of reasons as Eamon Morrissey emigrated to Australia, Jim Treacy was injured, Kieran Purcell had appendicitis and Eddie Keher broke his collarbone. An under strength team put up a good showing against Limerick; however, a Mossie Dowling goal eight minutes into the second-half turned the tide. Richie Bennis spearheaded Limerick's attack and they were easy 1–21 to 1-14 winners in the end. It was their first All-Ireland title since 1940. It should however be noted that Mickey Graham, the first choice center forward on the Limerick panel and Jim O'Donnell the first choice center back, and man of the match against Clare that year, were both missing in '73 and '74 for the Munster men

The Kilkenny-Limerick rematch took place in the 1974 championship decider. This time both sides had their full complement of players; however, Limerick were hopeful of retaining the title for the first time in their history. Their expectations were justified when they raced into a five-point lead in the first ten minutes. Kilkenny, however, were the goal-scoring masters and three from Mick ‘Cloney’ Brennan, Pat Delaney and Eddie Keher stopped Limerick. At full-time Kilkenny were the winners by 3–19 to 1-13.

In 1975 Galway booked their place in the All-Ireland final after a stunning victory over Cork in the semi-final. It was their first appearance in a final since 1958. Kilkenny were lining out in a record-equaling fifth championship decider. Galway started quickly again and took the lead in the eighteenth minute with a Frank Burke goal. The men from the west had a three-point lead at the interval with P.J. Qualter scoring a quick goal after the restart. Eddie Keher's 2-7 kept Galway within close range and eventually reeled the in. Kilkenny showed their class to win by twelve points and collect a third All-Ireland title in four years.

== 1976–1978 ==
While Kilkenny dominated the early 1970s, the second part of the decade belonged to Cork. 1976 saw Cork win a second consecutive Munster title, allowing the team to advance directly to the All-Ireland final where Wexford provided the opposition. Both sides had high expectations. Cork got off to the worst possible start in an All-Ireland final and trailed by 2-2 after six minutes. 'The Rebels' battled back; however, the game hung in the balance for much of the seventy. With ten minutes left Wexford were two points to the good; however, three points by Jimmy Barry-Murphy, two by Pat Moylan and a kicked effort from captain Ray Cummins gave Cork a merited 2–21 to 4–11 victory.

In 1977 Cork cruised through the provincial campaign again and, following a defeat of Galway in the semi-final, the men in red booked their place in a second consecutive All-Ireland final showdown with Wexford. Like the previous year the game turned into a close, exciting affair. A Seánie O'Leary goal, together with saves by goalkeeper Martin Coleman helped Cork to a 1–17 to 3–8 victory.

And Jimmy Barry-Murphy, the scorer of
the goal that could win an All-Ireland.

— Michael O'Hehir's commentary on RTÉ
following the deciding score in the 1978
All-Ireland final.

1978 saw Cork sneak a narrow 0–13 to 0–11 win over Clare in the Munster final, paving the way for 'the Rebels' to take on Kilkenny in the subsequent All-Ireland final. The stakes were high as Cork were attempting to capture a first three in-a-row since 1954. The game, however, was not the classic that many expected. Cork were never really troubled over the course of the seventy minutes. With thirteen minutes left Jimmy Barry-Murphy hit a low shot in towards the goal and it bounced in past goalkeeper Noel Skehan. The goal turned out to be the deciding factor as Cork went on to win the game and a third All-Ireland title in-a-row.

== 1979–1981 ==
Cork's bid for a record-equalling fourth All-Ireland title in-a-row fell short when the team were beaten by Galway in the All-Ireland semi-final. Because of this the men from the west advanced to the championship decider where Kilkenny were waiting. Unfortunately, the last final of the seventies turned out to be the least exciting of the decade. Galway goalkeeper Séamus Shinnors had an absolute nightmare of a game. A 70-yards free by Liam 'Chunky' O’Brien after just four minutes dipped, hit off Shinnors and ended up in the Galway net. Galway fought back and went two points up twelve minutes into the second half courtesy of a Noel Lane goal; however, they failed to score for the rest of the game. Four minutes before the end of the game another long-range free for Kilkenny ended up in the net behind Shinnors. It was a score which summed up the day for Galway as Kilkenny went on to win by 2–12 to 1-8

A mhuintir na Gaillimhe, tar éis seacht bliain
agus caoga, tá Craobh na hÉireann ar ais i
nGaillimh. Is iontach an lá innui a bheith mar
Gaillimhach. Ta daoine anois i nGaillimh agus
tá gliondar ina gcroi. Ach freisin caithimíd
caoimhniú ar daoine i Sasana, i Meiriceá, ar
fud na tíre agus tá siad ag caoineadh anois
láthair...People of Galway, we love you!

— Joe Connolly's acceptance speech
following the 1980 All-Ireland final.

In 1980 Galway reached the All-Ireland final for a second year in-a-row with Munster champions Limerick providing the opposition. An exciting championship decider followed. Bernie Forde and P.J. Molloy goals for Galway meant that the men from the west led by 2–7 to 1–5 at half-time. Éamonn Cregan single-handedly launched the Limerick counter-attack in the second-half. Over the course of the game he scored 2–7, including an overhead goal and a point in which he showed the ball to full-back Conor Hayes and nonchalantly drove the ball over the bar. It was not enough to stem the tide and Galway went on to win the game. It was the county's first All-Ireland title since 1923 and the celebrations surpassed anything ever seen in Croke Park. It took captain Joe Connolly ten minutes to reach the rostrum in the Hogan Stand to collect the Liam MacCarthy Cup; however, once there he delivered one of the most famous acceptance speeches of all-time. Delivered through his native Irish, Connolly was clearly overcome with emotion as he finished.

In 1981 the hurling records continued to tumble as the All-Ireland final was contested by Galway and Offaly. An exciting game developed between these two breakthrough hurling teams with both sides exchanging tit-for-tat scores. After fourteen minutes Pat Carroll scored the opening goal of the game for Offaly; however, neither side built up a strong lead. Straight after the interval goalkeeper Damien Martin was doing great work when he batted out an almost certain Galway goal. With just over twenty minutes left in the game Galway led by six points; however, the team failed to score for the rest of the match. Offaly, on the other hand, ate into this lead. Johnny Flaherty’s hand-passed goal with three minutes was the deciding score of the game. At the full-time whistle Offaly were the winners by 2-12 to 0-15. Like the championship decider of twelve months earlier, there were great scenes of jubilation as Offaly claimed the Liam MacCarthy Cup for the first time.

== 1982–1986 ==
After the breakthroughs of the previous two seasons the old order was restored in 1982 with Cork and Kilkenny lining out in the championship decider. Cork were the red-hot favourites following a 5-31 to 3-6 trouncing of Waterford in the Munster final, while Kilkenny had a tough route to the final. Kilkenny bucked the trend when Christy Heffernan scored two goals in a forty-second spell just before the interval to take the wind out of Cork's sails. Ger Fennelly got a third goal within eight minutes of the re-start, giving Kilkenny an unexpected 3-18 to 1-15 victory.

1983 saw both Kilkenny and Cork do battle again in the championship decider. ‘The Cats’ used a strong wind to dominate the opening half and built up a strong lead. Cork came storming back with goals by Tomás Mulcahy and Seánie O’Leary; however, at the full-time whistle Kilkenny had won by 2–14 to 2-12. In spite of losing a second All-Ireland final on the trot the Cork team and supporters were optimistic for the following year.

1984 was a special year in the annals of Gaelic games as it was the centenary year of the Gaelic Athletic Association. Because of the year that was in it, every team made a special effort to claim the All-Ireland title. Kilkenny, the three-in-a-row hopefuls, were ousted at an early stage of the championship. Offaly booked their place in a special All-Ireland final at Semple Stadium with Cork, the Munster champions for the third successive year, soon booking their place. In spite of the GAA celebrating one hundred years, it was their first ever meeting of these two teams in the history of the championship. The centenary-year final failed to live up to expectations and Cork recorded a relatively easy 3–16 to 1–12 victory. In doing so Cork claimed their twenty-fifth championship title and avoided becoming the first team to lose three-in-a-row.

In a repeat of 1981 both Offaly and Galway lined out against each other in another All-Ireland final. Both teams were out to prove that their earlier All-Ireland victories were not flashes in the pan. A tense game ensued; however, it was Offaly's goal-scoring ability that proved crucial. Pat Cleary scored the first of the day after twenty-five minutes of play and got his second less than half a minute after the restart. Joe Dooley had a goal disallowed halfway through the second-half while a long Joe Cooney effort, which seemed to cross the goal line, was not given. P.J. Molloy was Galway's goal scorer; however, the day belonged to Offaly. A 2–11 to 1–12 victory gave Offaly a second All-Ireland title.

In 1986 Cork claimed a fifth Munster title in-a-row for the third time in their history, thus booking their spot in the All-Ireland final. Galway, the defeated finalists of the previous year provided the opposition and were the red-hot favourites against an ageing Cork team. On the day, however, a different story unfolded. Four Cork goals, one from John Fenton, two from Tomás Mulcahy and one from Kevin Hennessy, stymied the Galway attack and helped ‘the Rebels’ to a merited 4–13 to 2–15 victory.

== 1987–1988 ==
The 1987 championship threw up some interesting surprises. Galway put down an early signal of intent by claiming the National League title at Clare's expense. In Munster Tipperary defeated Cork after a thrilling draw and a replay to deny 'the Rebels' a record-breaking six-in-a-row. In Leinster Kilkenny broke back to take the title and book an All-Ireland final spot against Galway. The prospect of becoming the first team to lose three consecutive championship deciders weighed heavily on the Galway team and probably gave them an extra impetus to win. The game was not a classic by any standard and Noel Lane got a key goal for Galway nine minutes before the end. A 1–12 to 0–9 victory gave Galway a second All-Ireland title of the decade and proved that their win in 1980 was not a once-off.

In 1988 Galway reached a fourth successive All-Ireland final. After more than a decade-and-a-half in the wilderness Tipperary, the fallen superpower, were back providing the opposition in the championship decider. Galway defeated Tipp in the semi-final the previous year; however, with an extra year's experience it was expected that Tipperary might shade the victory. Galway, however, used this to motivate themselves as they believed their championship victory the previous year did not earn them the respect they were due. Noel Lane again scored the crucial goal for Galway while Nicky English sent a late penalty over the bar for a point. A 1–15 to 0–14 score line resulted in victory for Galway and a third All-Ireland title, ensuring that the eighties definitely belonged to Galway.

== 1989–1993 ==
In 1989 Tipperary were still the best team in Munster and won a third provincial title. For the third time in as many years Tipp faced Galway in the All-Ireland series; however, on this occasion the men from the West were without their star player Tony Keady. The game turned out to be a tense and unsavory affair as Tipp finally triumphed over Galway. Antrim, the surprise winners of the other semi-final, provided the opposition in the subsequent All-Ireland final. It was an historic occasion as it was only the second appearance of an Ulster team in the championship decider. Antrim's relative inexperience robbed the final of any real element of contest and Tipp romped home to a 4–24 to 3–9 win. Nicky English entered the record books with a personal tally of 2-12, while Tipperary preserved their record of being the only team to win an All-Ireland title in every decade of the GAA's existence.

In 1990 Tipperary looked set for another year of dominance at the top of the hurling world. The Munster final pitted them against Cork; however, Tipperary manager Michael "Babs" Keating dismissed Cork's chances of a victory. He was forced to eat his words as Cork secured an odds-defying 4–16 to 2–14 victory over their greatest rivals. Cork subsequently qualified for another All-Ireland final showdown with Galway. Galway were again the favourites and were out to make amends and capture a third All-Ireland title in four seasons. Shortly after half-time the westerners were up by seven points and were cruising to victory thanks to a masterclass in hurling by Joe Cooney. Cork's Tomás Mulcahy, however, played a captain's role and scored a crucial goal that revitalised the Cork attack. The final score of 5–15 to 2-21 gave Cork the victory in one of the most open and exciting hurling finals in years. Two weeks later the Cork Gaelic footballers claimed the All-Ireland title, thus securing a double.

Tipperary bounced back in 1991 and defeated Cork in a thrilling Munster final replay. The subsequent All-Ireland final saw Tipperary take on Kilkenny for the first time in exactly twenty years. A freak goal by Michael Cleary in the first-half gave Tipp a lead which they never surrendered. A 1–16 to 0–15 victory allowed Tipperary to claim a second All-Ireland title in three years.

In 1992 Kilkenny bounced back from the All-Ireland defeat. That year's championship decider saw ‘the Cats’ take on Cork for the first time in nearly a decade. The game was well balanced for the first-half; however, new sensation D.J. Carey scored a goal four minutes before the break. This seemed to give Kilkenny the impetus to go on and win the game. Two more goals by John Power and Michael Phelan in the second-half secured a win for Kilkenny and a first All-Ireland title since 1983.

In 1993 Kilkenny were still on top of the hurling world as the team lined out in a third successive All-Ireland final. That year "the Cats" faced Galway for the first time since 1987. Galway won on that occasion; however, in 1993 they were lagging behind Kilkenny for much of the game. They went a point ahead coming into the last quarter; however, Kilkenny won the match by five points.

== 1994–1998 ==
The Riverdance of sport.

— Former Wexford manager Liam Griffin's
description of the "hurling revolution".

For five years in the middle of the nineties the so-called ‘weaker counties’ emerged and made hay while the traditional powers found it difficult to retain their status. The Liam MacCarthy Cup traveled to six different counties throughout the nineties, more counties than any other previous decade. Cork, Kilkenny and Tipperary took a back seat as Offaly, Clare, Limerick and Wexford all made their mark.

=== 1994 — Offaly triumph in the five-minute final ===
When people ask me about it, I just tell them
it was a freak accident; 2-5 in five minutes
is not something you plan for, you don’t go
out to training with that in mind. We hadn’t
played as well as we could that day —
looking back we didn’t really appreciate it
because we were young

— Former Offaly hurler Johnny Pilkington
speaking about Offaly's smash-and-grab
victory in the 1994 All-Ireland final.

In 1994 the revolution began with Limerick claiming the Munster title while Offaly emerged as the top dogs in Leinster. Both sides subsequently qualified for the All-Ireland final. The match was a rather unremarkable affair, save for an explosive final five minutes. Offaly trailed by five points with as many minutes left when they were awarded a close-in free. Johnny Dooley was given the signal from the management team to go for a point; however, he decided to ‘do something different’. The sliotar ended up in the Limerick net, thus opening the floodgates for a remarkable finish. Seconds later the sliotar flew into the Limerick net again, courtesy of Pat O'Connor. Limerick failed to counter as Offaly tacked on some more points to win by 3–16 to 2-13. The ‘five-minute final’ resulted in mixed emotions for Éamonn Cregan, as the Offaly manager was a native of Limerick.

=== 1995 — Clare's first in 81 years ===
We're going to do it!

— Clare manager Ger Loughnane's parting
words during a half-time interview in the
1995 All-Ireland final.

There's been a missing person in Clare for
eighty-one long years. Today, that person
has been found alive and well. And that
person's name is Liam MacCarthy.

— Anthony Daly, Clare captain, after
accepting the Liam MacCarthy Cup in 1995.

1995 saw the championship embark on a modern departure, when Guinness took over as sponsors of the competition. The championship saw more advancement by the underdogs as the All-Ireland final was contested by Clare and Offaly. The omens pointed towards Offaly retaining their title, particularly since Clare made history by bridging a sixty-three-year gap to even reach the final. At half-time Offaly were in the lead, courtesy of a dropping shot by Michael Duignan which goalkeeper Davy Fitzgerald dropped over his own goal line. Éamonn Taaffe entered the game almost unnoticed in the second-half; however, it was his goal that lifted Clare and eventually resulted in the collapse of the Offaly defence. At the full-time whistle the mould cracked as Clare won by 1-13 t 2–8. It was their first All-Ireland title since 1914, as the curse of Biddy Earley was finally broken.

=== 1996 — Limerick heartbreak as Wexford return ===
In 1996 the hurling revolution continued. Limerick reached their second All-Ireland final in three years, while Wexford booked their place in the championship decider after a nineteen-year absence. A goal by Tom Dempsey in the opening half gave Wexford a deserved 1–8 to 0–10 lead at the interval; however, they had been reduced to fourteen men after the sending-off of Éamonn Scallan. The second-half saw their four-point lead being whittled down to just two points; however, fourteen-man Wexford clung on to win by 1–13 to 0-14.

=== 1997 — Clare's second in three years ===
The 1997 championship saw the biggest-ever change to the format of the competition. The introduction of the ‘back-door system’ afforded the defeated Munster and Leinster finalists a second chance to challenge for the All-Ireland title. The new format worked well in the inaugural year, as the All-Ireland final was a repeat of the Munster final. For the first time ever the final was contested by two teams from the same province as Clare and Tipperary faced each other for the second time that year. Clare had the upper-hand for much of the game; however, Tipp remained close behind. Liam Cahill and Eugene O'Neill scored two goals for Tipp in the last ten minutes to set up a grandstand finish. A draw looked likely; however, a classic late point from Jamesie O'Connor secured a narrow 0–20 to 2–13 victory for Clare.

=== 1998 — Offaly: the first back door champions ===
Sheep in a heap.

— Michael 'Babs' Keating's description of the
Offaly team after the Leinster final defeat.

In 1998 Clare were again the favourites to take a third All-Ireland title in four years after securing the Munster title. Their next game was an All-Ireland semi-final meeting with Offaly. The Offaly team had been defeated in the Leinster final, resulting in the players revolting against manager Michael 'Babs' Keating. Clare were the red-hot favourites; however, it took a late equalizer by Jamesie O'Connor to secure a draw. The replay was a bizarre affair. With two minutes left to play Clare were 1–16 to 2-10 ahead and looked destined for victory; however, referee Jimmy Cooney blew the full-time whistle. The Offaly supporters launched a sit-down protest on the pitch at Croke Park and a second replay was granted. By this stage Clare were exhausted and lost the game by 0–16 to 0-13. For the second year in-a-row the All-Ireland final was contested by two teams from the same province as Offaly took on Kilkenny. The defeated Leinster finalists, Offaly, had certainly learned from their mistakes with Joe Errity and Brian Whelahan scoring key goals. At the full-time whistle Offaly emerged as the winners by 2–16 to 1-13. It was the first time that a defeated team had won the All-Ireland title via the "back door system".

== 1999–2006 ==
Welcome back to Leeside Liam MacCarthy we missed you
a lot!

— Cork captain Mark Landers's acceptance speech in 1999.

The promise of the new teams of the nineties failed to materialise as the turn of the new century saw "the big three" reclaim their dominance at the top of the hurling world.

The last All-Ireland final of the decade saw Cork, the Munster champions for the first time since 1992, take on Kilkenny. "The Cats" were the red-hot favourites going into the game; however, inclement conditions robbed the fans of what was expected to be a classic game of hurling. Kilkenny led by four points with fifteen minutes left; however, Cork fought back. Both sides shot seventeen wides as Cork, with an average age of twenty-two, won the game by 0–13 to 0-12. It was the first final between both these sides that failed to produce a goal.

In 2000 Kilkenny qualified for a third consecutive All-Ireland final; however, the prospect of becoming the first team to lose three-in-a-row loomed large. Offaly, the team defeated by Kilkenny in the Leinster final, came through the "back door" and booked their place in the championship decider. A rout took place as the men from "the faithful county" proved no match for the scoring abilities of Henry Shefflin and D. J. Carey. The long whistle signaled a 5–15 to 1–14 victory for Kilkenny – the millennium champions.

2001 saw Tipperary, the third member of "the big three", reach the All-Ireland final for the first time in ten years. The men from "the premier county" renewed their rivalry with Galway, who qualified for the All-Ireland final after a defeat of Kilkenny in the semi-final. Mark O'Leary bagged two goals for Tipp, enough to withstand a mighty comeback by Galway. With nine minutes left Galway only trailed by a point; however, Tipp forged ahead to win by 2–18 to 2-15. It was their twenty-fifth All-Ireland title.

In 2002 Kilkenny captured the National Hurling League title before later lining out in the All-Ireland final. Clare, a team defeated in the opening round of the provincial championship, maneuvered through the newly expanded qualifiers and provided the opposition. Again, Henry Shefflin and D.J. Carey combined to score key goals for Kilkenny, as Clare's forwards missed two goal opportunities. The full-time whistle saw "the Cats" win by 2–20 to 0-19.

In 2003 Cork put early season background difficulties behind them and qualified for the All-Ireland final. Kilkenny, the reigning champions, provided the opposition as they went in search of a third All-Ireland title in four years. Kilkenny were the favourites; however, Cork did not let ‘the Cats’ run away with the game. Setanta Ó hAilpín leveled with a goal for Cork; however, Martin Comerford’s goal with five minutes to go sealed the deal as Kilkenny won by 1-14 to 1-11. This victory brought Kilkenny level with Cork at the top of the all-time All-Ireland roll of honour.

In 2004, Cork and Kilkenny played each other in another All-Ireland final. ‘The Cats’ were going for an unprecedented three-in-a-row and the chance to top the all-time roll of honour. Cork, on the other hand, were out to beat them. A rain-soaked day robbed the fans of a classic for the second time in five years and the first-half left a lot to be desired. Cork took command in the second period of play and scored nine points without reply in the final twenty-three minutes. A 0–17 to 0–9 score line gave Cork the victory and put an end to a Kilkenny treble.

Is fada an turas é ó Fiji go Corcaigh agus ó Chorcaigh
go Páirc an Chrócaigh

— Cork captain Seán Óg Ó hAilpín's acceptance speech
in 1999.

In 2005 all hurling fans predicted a Cork-Kilkenny showdown for the third year in-a-row; however, the All-Ireland semi-finals proved intriguing. Cork narrowly defeated Clare after a fantastic comeback to book their place in a third consecutive All-Ireland final. Kilkenny, on the other hand, were blindsided by Galway in the second semi-final in one of the games of the decade. The final saw Cork take on Galway in the final for the first time since 1990. Ben O'Connor scored a goal in the sixteenth minute to give Cork a mighty boost. Galway fought back; however, they failed to bridge the gap as Cork ran out 1–21 to 1-16 winners. It was Cork's thirtieth All-Ireland title as "the Rebels" preserved their 100% record over "the Tribesmen" in All-Ireland deciders. Fiji-born team captain Seán Óg Ó hAilpín was lauded for his acceptance speech, delivered in the Irish language.

== 2006–2012 ==
Kilkenny...a side who have won six of the last
11 [National League] titles, nine of the last 13
championships. They are the hurling benchmark
of all time.

— Diarmuid O'Flynn writing in the Irish Examiner.

=== 2006 — Kilkenny deny a Rebel treble ===
In 2006, Kilkenny and Cork renewed their rivalry as both sides qualified for another All-Ireland final. The Leesiders were aiming for a third All-Ireland victory in-a-row; however, revenge was foremost in the minds of Kilkenny as it was Cork who denied their three-in-a-row bid in 2004. On the day Kilkenny were far too strong for Cork as "the Cats" secured a 1–16 to 1–13 victory after a bruising encounter.

=== 2007 — Limerick fall to Kilkenny ===
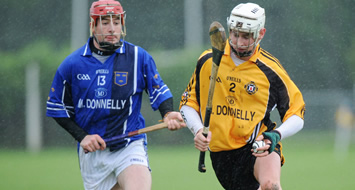
Andrew O'Shaughnessy (left) representing Munster, played a key role in Limerick's march to the All-Ireland final in 2007.

Kilkenny were the pre-tournament favourites in 2007 and proved themselves worthy of this billing by reaching the final with ease. Their dominance continued in the final itself when they defeated Limerick by seven points on a 2–19 to 1–15 score line. After scoring two early goals, Kilkenny maintained a lead of at least five points throughout the match and were never in any real danger of losing. By winning their 30th title Kilkenny drew level with Cork on the all-time roll of honour.

=== 2008 — Waterford steamrolled as Kilkenny secure a hat-trick of titles ===
It's been almost a century since we last achieved
this feat [three All-Ireland titles in-a-row]. In 1934
it couldn't be done. In 1976 it couldn't be done. In
1984 it couldn't be done. In 1994 it couldn't be done.
In 2004 it couldn't be done. In 2008 it has been
done and by God it's been done well!

— Kilkenny captain James "Cha" Fitzpatrick's
acceptance speech in 2008.

In 2008, Kilkenny again dominated the hurling championship. Tipperary were predicted to challenge "the Cats" in the championship decider; however, it was first-round losers Waterford who booked their place against Kilkenny in the final. It was their first meeting in the championship decider in forty-five years. In a disappointingly one-sided final, Brian Cody's side produced a near perfect seventy minutes to re-confirm themselves as hurling's kingpins. Waterford endured a nightmare afternoon as arguably the greatest Kilkenny team of all-time secured their first All-Ireland three-in-a-row since 1913. The statistics speak for themselves. A 23-point winning margin, 3-24 from play, only two wides in the entire match and eight scorers in all with Eddie Brennan (2-04) and Henry Shefflin (0-08) leading the way in a 3–30 to 1–13 victory.

=== 2009 — Kilkenny's four-in-a-row ===
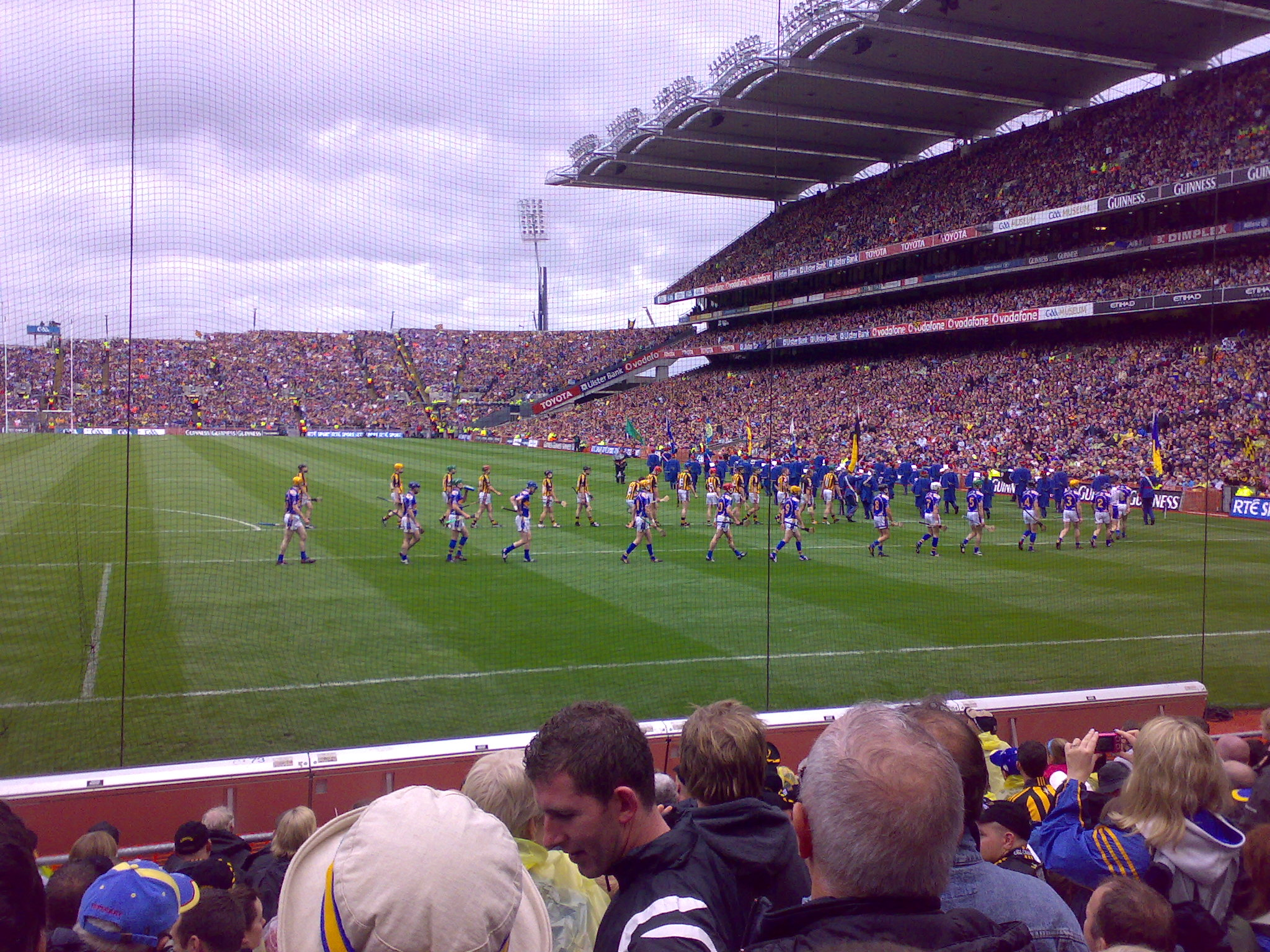
The Kilkenny and Tipperary teams parade before the 2009 All-Ireland final at Croke Park.

A crowd of 82,106 at Croke Park was treated to one of the best All-Ireland finals of all-time. Kilkenny created a piece of history with a fourth successive All-Ireland title following a defeat of Tipperary, thus becoming only the second county to put four titles back-to-back, joining the successful Cork team of the 1940s in an elite club. For long periods Tipp looked like they were going to end the reign of Brian Cody's side. Tipperary had to play almost twenty minutes with fourteen men following the dismissal of Benny Dunne, and their resolve was finally broken in the final stages, when late goals from Henry Shefflin and substitute Martin Comerford finally killed off their heroic efforts to secure a 2–22 to 0–23 victory.

=== 2010 — Tipperary halt the drive for five ===
Tipperary's first All-Ireland title since 2001 thwarted Kilkenny's bid for a record-breaking fifth successive Liam MacCarthy Cup triumph. Kilkenny's first championship defeat in 22 games was delivered in compelling fashion by the Munster men, who reached the final via the "back door" with wins over Wexford, Offaly, Galway and Waterford, and in their capacity to avenge the previous season's painful defeat in the decider. Brian Cody's gamble on attacker Henry Shefflin's famous knee did not come off, and the Kilkenny ace was forced to retire injured after just 12 minutes. On the other hand, Liam Sheedy's heroes produced a devastating attacking display, embellished by a Lar Corbett hat-trick of goals as they swept to a 4–17 to 1–18 victory.

=== 2011 — The wounded cats fight back ===
Kilkenny held out in a thriller to defeat defending champions Tipperary and win their 33rd All-Ireland title at Croke Park. Meeting in the decider for the third year in a row, two committed sides laid on another encounter, never waning in its pace and intensity. Michael Fennelly and Richie Hogan grabbed the vital goals, late in each half, while Henry Shefflin celebrated his record-equalling eighth title triumph with a seven-points haul. For Brian Cody, it was also an eighth Liam MacCarthy Cup success as a manager.

=== 2012 — Kilkenny's sixth in seven years ===
On 9 September 2012, Galway faced Kilkenny in an All-Ireland decider for the first time in nineteen years. Both sides had previously met in the Leinster final, with Galway securing a ten-point win and a first provincial title. Joe Canning struck a stoppage time equaliser to send the final to a replay for the first time since 1959. Canning smashed home a tenth-minute goal, and his 1-6 tally helped the Tribesmen to a 1–9 to 0-7 interval lead, with Henry Shefflin converting four Kilkenny frees. The Cats went in front, before Niall Burke fired in Galway's second goal. Shefflin finished with 12 points, but Canning's 1-9 tally dictated that two great teams would meet again following a superb encounter.

The replay took place three weeks later on 30 September 2012. Galway stunned the reigning champions with two first-half goals, but their task became impossible twenty minutes from the end when they were reduced to fourteen men following Cyril Donnellan's dismissal. Championship debutant Walter Walsh gave a man of the match performance, claiming a 1-3 haul to announce his arrival on the senior stage in spectacular fashion. The 3–22 to 3-11 Kilkenny victory was a personal milestone for Henry Shefflin, who became the first player to win nine All-Ireland medals on the field of play, and he marked a special occasion with another special performance, contributing nine points to the Kilkenny cause.

== 2013 ==
=== 2013 — Clare emerge from the pack ===
Prior to the start of the championship Kilkenny, Tipperary and Galway were the bookmakers favourites as potential All-Ireland champions. Few could have predicted that any other team would make the breakthrough. Former Offaly hurler Danny Owens was fearful for the future, stating that "Kilkenny, Cork and Tipperary will win every All-Ireland from now until Kingdom come". What subsequently unfolded led to claims of 2013 being the best championship of all-time.

After an incredible championship, which saw the three favourites fail to even make the semi-final stage, Cork and Clare emerged at the top of the pile to contest the All-Ireland final. In front of a crowd of 81,651, Clare started brightly with early scores from Darach Honan and Colin Ryan. Clare led by 0–12 to 0–10 at the break, and they continued to brin intensity to the contest, forcing the Rebels into errors, which they exploited with further scores from Tony Kelly and the unerring Ryan, who steered over his sixth free for a four-point lead. Cork were far from finished, however, and when Pa Cronin saw his chance, he picked his spot with an accurate finish to the net, and the sides were level going into the final five minutes. Patrick Horgan appeared to have won it for them with his tenth score in stoppage-time, but there was still time for Domhnall O'Donovan to pop up with a dramatic leveller in the 73rd minute.

The replay just under three weeks later was the first time an All-Ireland hurling decider was played on a Saturday. Clare emerged as champions for the first time since 1997 after defeating Cork by 5–16 to 3–16 in a classic at Croke Park. Shane O'Donnell, a late call-up to the starting line-up in place of Darach Honan, justified his inclusion with a stunning individual haul of 3-3, all from play. O'Donnell hit all three goals in the opening nineteen minutes of the first half and while Cork came from eight points down to draw level during the second half, the winners had a kick left in them as goals from Conor McGrath and sub Honan secured a fourth Liam MacCarthy Cup success for Clare. With 18 minutes left on the watch, the scores were level at 1–16 to 3-10 and they were deadlocked again with ten minutes left as Séamus Harnedy's goal brought Cork on terms, 2–16 to 3-13. But Clare's response was magnificent as McGrath crashed home a magnificent 62nd-minute goal into the top corner of the Davin Stand netting. Clare pushed six points clear, 4–16 to 2-16, before Stephen Moylan’s stoppage time goal for Cork brought a spellbound Croke Park to life once more. But in the second minute of stoppage time, Honan cut in from the left touchline and somehow managed to bundle the ball over the line for the eighth goal of a quite incredible spectacle.

== 2014–2016 ==
=== 2014 — An encore after the greatest final of them all ===
It's been lauded as the greatest hurling final ever,
even the greatest hurling game ever. Whatever
about being the best game or final ever, last Sunday
surely confirmed that the rivalry between this set of
Kilkenny hurlers and this group of Tipperary hurlers
is the greatest in GAA history.

— Kieran Shannon of the Irish Examiner lauds the
rivalry following the drawn 2014 All-Ireland final

On 7 September 2014, the Kilkenny-Tipperary hurling rivalry reached its apex with an All-Ireland final display that has come to be regarded as the greatest of all time. Both sides claimed 54 scores and just nine wides between them in a third successive drawn final. As early as the 10th minute, Kilkenny had a two-on-one situation but Colin Fennelly miscued as he attempted to funnel the ball through to brother Michael and the chance was lost. In the 42nd minute, Séamus Callanan’s shot was blocked after taking a pass from Lar Corbett and with 13 minutes remaining. Richie Hogan, with a haul of 0-06 from play, picked up the pieces to fire the Leinster champions into a four-point lead, 3-21 to 1-23. But back came Tipp from that four-point deficit, with Callanan and Paddy Stapleton reducing the deficit to just two. T. J. Reid’s 66th-minute free pushed Kilkenny three ahead again but scores from John O'Dwyer, sub Jason Forde and O’Dwyer again hauled Tipp level. As the game entered its final plays, there was time for one massive talking point. After Brian Hogan had a highly debatable free given against him, John O’Dwyer was given a chance to hand Tipp the victory with a 97-metre free. Hawk-Eye confirmed how close he had come to settling a titanic clash, which ended in a draw.

The replay three weeks later was a very different game. From the start, Kilkenny went with man-marking roles on the Tipperary danger men. Richie Power struck the first goal in the 59th minute and younger brother John, one of three pre-match changes to the starting team, pounced from close range after Darren Gleeson pulled off a save to keep out a deflected Michael Fennelly effort. Tipperary battled valiantly all the way to the end, and when Séamus Callanan scored his second goal of the evening in the 69th minute, a grandstand finish looked certain. Colin Fennelly crowned Kilkenny’s win with the final score of the game as the clock ran out on Tipperary and Henry Shefflin secured a record-breaking 10th winners' medal.

=== 2015 — Galway reeled in by Kilkenny ===
On 6 September 2015, Kilkenny faced a Galway team who had been buoyed by a thrilling win over Tipperary in the All-Ireland semi-final. Galway's reason for optimism seemed justified when they settled well to go 0-4 to 0-2 clear in the 9th minute. Kilkenny pounced for a goal in the 13th minute, T. J. Reid rattling the net after being placed in space by Walter Walsh. A Reid free moments later left the Cats ahead 1-04 to 0-05 but it didn’t prove a setback for Galway as they pushed forward again. Joe Canning, Jason Flynn and Conor Whelan all weighed in with some memorable points and they enjoyed a three-point advantage at the interval. Kilkenny emerged a different proposition in the second-half and quickly wiped out Galway’s lead to draw level at 1-11 to 0-14. Trailing by 1-17 to 0-16 at the midway mark of the second-half, the signs looked ominous for Galway as Kilkenny closed out the game in a clinical fashion to secure a 1-22 to 1-18 victory.

=== 2016 — Tipperary finally blow Kilkenny away ===
For the sixth time in eight seasons, Kilkenny and Tipperary faced off in an All-Ireland final on 4 September 2016. The pattern of the first-half saw the teams refusing to yield as they stayed close to each other. Kilkenny may have been in front 0-3 to 0-1 after seven minutes but Tipperary soon reeled them in and the teams were level ten times on the scoreboard in the opening period. Seven minutes after the restart, Kilkenny led by 1-14 to 0-15 after a Kevin Kelly goal, however, they then conceded 1-04 without reply which put Tipperary firmly back in control. By the 55th minute, Tipperary had stormed 1-22 to 1-15 and the final nail was hammered into Kilkenny’s coffin with John McGrath’s blast to the net. Richie Hogan slammed a Kilkenny goal in response with a clever ground stroke but Tipperary finished strong and put an end to their Kilkenny bogey with a 2-29 to 2-20 win.

== 2017–2019 ==
=== 2017 — Glorious Galway ===
Galway entered the All-Ireland final against Waterford having lost six finals since their previous win in 1988. They started wonderfully to hit four points without replay and scored from their opening nine shots of the game. But Waterford managed to bag two first-half goals, Kevin Moran drilling a shot to the net in the 4th minute and Kieran Bennett’s long delivery deceiving goalkeeper Colm Callanan in the 21st minute. At the break, Galway were ahead 0–14 to 2-7 but Waterford got the better of the early second-half scoring exchanges with a Pauric Mahony free nudging them in front 2-12 to 0-17 by the 47th minute. Galway responded magnificently as they went 0-21 to 2-12 clear. Waterford countered again before Galway stood up once more as they clung to a 0-22 to 2-15 lead with ten minutes remaining. They outscored Waterford 0-4 to 0-2 in the finale as they finally delivered the Liam MacCarthy Cup after 29 years.

=== 2018 — Unlimited heartbreak no more for Limerick ===
A remarkable season of championship hurling, the first to employ a new round robin format, saw Galway face Limerck in the All-Ireland final. Limerick got an injection of confidence in the 16th minute with a Graeme Mulcahy goal that arrived moments after Galway had crept in front by 0-6 to 0-5. That provided the platform for Limerick and when their second goal arrived courtesy of Tom Morrissey in the 54th minute it had the feel of sealing the matter. Galway chipped away at Limerick’s advantage but Shane Dowling netted a third Limerick goal. Limerick led by 3–15 to 0–16 with just two minutes of normal time left, however, a madcap and dramatic finale ensued before their status as champions was confirmed. Injury-time goals from Conor Whelan and Joe Canning gave Limerick an almighty fright before Mulcahy scored what proved to be the decisive point to secure the title after a 45-year wait.

=== 2019 — Back to the future for Tipperary ===
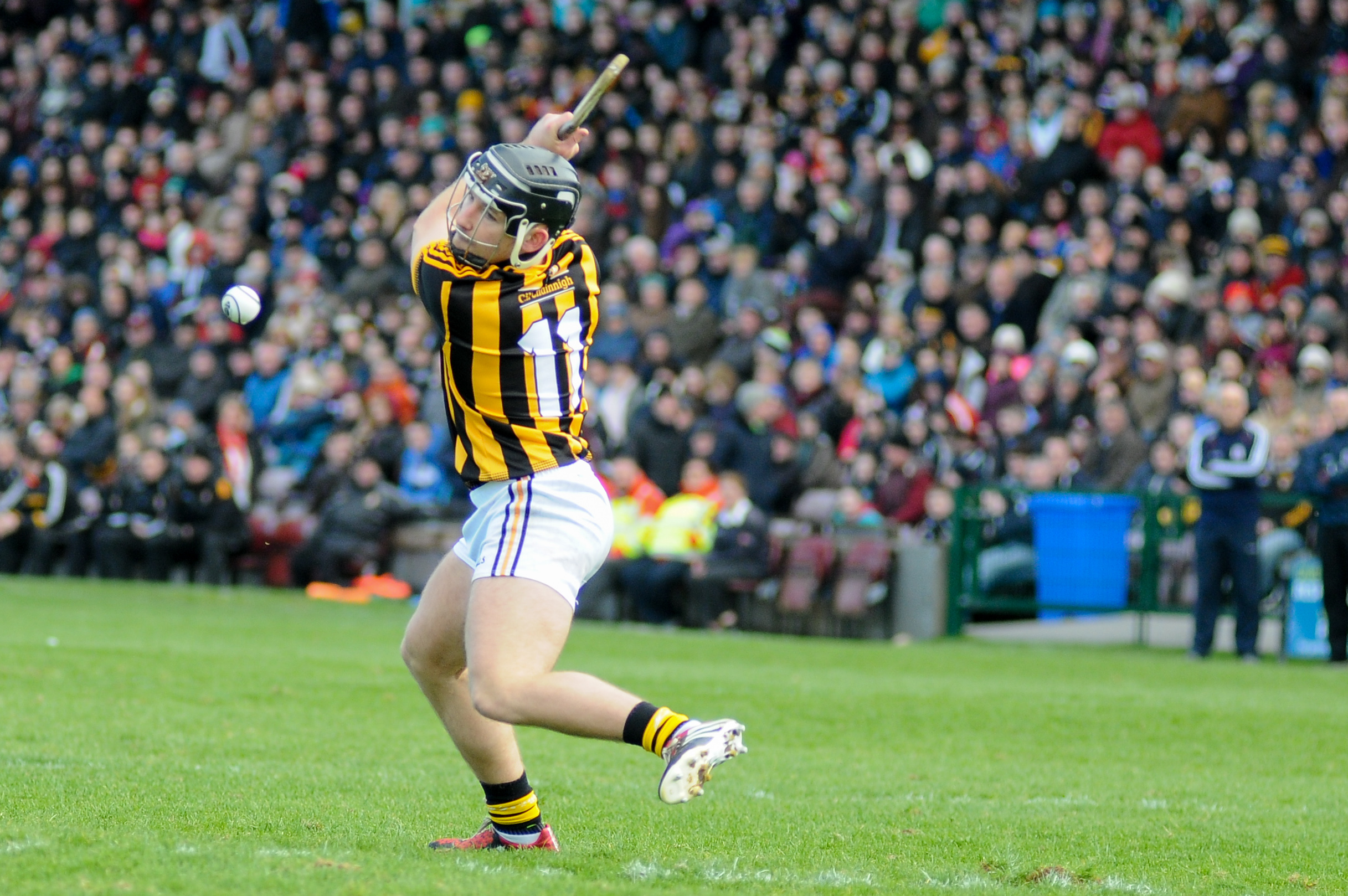
Richie Hogan was red-carded in the 2019 All-Ireland final.

The decade which saw five different All-Ireland champions ended as it began with a Tipperary-Kilkenny final. Kilkenny had the better of a scrappy opening period, leading by five points after 21 minutes, but a goal from Niall O'Meara kick-started Tipperary’s revival and just before half-time Richie Hogan was dismissed for a high challenge on Tipperary’s corner-back Cathal Barrett. Tipperary led by a point at the interval, 1-09 to 0-11 but, like their old rivals have so often done to them, they came storming out in the third quarter. Team captain Séamus Callanan and John O'Dwyer struck 1-01 apiece to send Tipperary streaking eight clear by the 42nd minute. Kilkenny needed goals after that but Tipperary used the extra man to good effect. Although T. J. Reid led the fight to the end, Tipperary’s substitutes all got in on the scoring spree to close out a comfortable 14-point win.

== Evolution of the Championship format ==
The format of the competition has evolved substantially over the years, notably with the introduction of the 'back-door system' in 1997, and the introduction of the qualifiers in 2002. The following summarizes the evolution of the championship format through the years:

- 1887: Knockout format for all teams with an open draw.
- 1888-1996: Knockout format for all teams based on the provincial system.
  - 1888-1896: The respective Munster and Leinster champions advanced directly to the All-Ireland final. There were no All-Ireland semi-finals.
  - 1897-1898: The respective Munster and Leinster champions would take it in turns every second year to play Galway, the sole representatives from Connacht, in a lone All-Ireland semi-final.
  - 1899: The respective Munster and Leinster champions advanced directly to the All-Ireland final. There were no All-Ireland semi-finals.
  - 1900-1903: The four provincial winners from Connacht, Leinster, Munster and Ulster were drawn against each other in two All-Ireland semi-finals. The two winners contested the All-Ireland 'home' final while the winners of this game played London in the All-Ireland final proper.
  - 1904: The four provincial winners from Connacht, Leinster, Munster and Ulster were drawn against each other in two All-Ireland semi-finals. The two winners contested the All-Ireland final.
  - 1905: Two All-Ireland quarter-finals were contested between Lancashire and the Leinster champions and Glasgow and the Ulster champions. The two winners of these games played each other in the All-Ireland semi-final. The Munster and Connacht champions contested the second All-Ireland semi-final.
  - 1906: The Leinster and Ulster champions contested a lone All-Ireland quarter-final. The winners played London in the All-Ireland semi-final. The Munster and Connacht champions contested the second All-Ireland semi-final.
  - 1907-1909: The four provincial winners from Connacht, Leinster, Munster and Ulster were drawn against each other in two All-Ireland semi-finals with the Munster and Leinster winners being kept apart. The two winners contested the All-Ireland final.
  - 1910: Two All-Ireland quarter-finals were contested between Lancashire and the Leinster champions and London and the Ulster champions. The two winners of these games played each other in the All-Ireland semi-final. The Munster and Connacht champions contested the second All-Ireland semi-final.
  - 1911-1912: The four provincial winners from Connacht, Leinster, Munster and Ulster were drawn against each other in two All-Ireland semi-finals with the Munster and Leinster winners being kept apart. The two winners contested the All-Ireland final.
  - 1913: The Leinster champions played Glasgow in a lone All-Ireland quarter-final. The winners of this game played Lancashire in the semi-final. The Munster and Connacht champions contested the second All-Ireland semi-final. The Ulster champions entered the All-Ireland junior championship.
  - 1914-1916: The Leinster champions advanced directly to the All-Ireland final The Munster and Connacht champions contested a lone All-Ireland semi-final.
  - 1917-1918: The respective Munster and Leinster champions advanced directly to the All-Ireland final. There were no All-Ireland semi-finals.
  - 1919-1922: The respective Munster and Leinster champions played the Connacht champions on an alternate basis every second year in a lone All-Ireland semi-final. The other team advanced directly to the All-Ireland final.
  - 1924-1925: The four provincial winners from Connacht, Leinster, Munster and Ulster were drawn against each other in two All-Ireland semi-finals with the Munster and Leinster winners being kept apart. The two winners contested the All-Ireland final.
  - 1926-1927: The respective Munster and Leinster champions played the Connacht champions on an alternate basis every second year in a lone All-Ireland semi-final. The other team advanced directly to the All-Ireland final.
  - 1928: The Munster and Leinster champions contested a lone All-Ireland semi-final. Galway received a bye into the All-Ireland final.
  - 1929-1942: The respective Munster and Leinster champions played the Connacht champions on an alternate basis every second year in a lone All-Ireland semi-final. The other team advanced directly to the All-Ireland final.
  - 1943: The Ulster and Connacht champions contested a lone All-Ireland quarter-final. The winners played the Leinster champions in a lone All-Ireland semi-final. The Munster champions advanced directly to the All-Ireland final.
  - 1944-1949: The four provincial winners from Connacht, Leinster, Munster and Ulster were drawn against each other in two All-Ireland semi-finals with the Munster and Leinster winners being kept apart. The two winners contested the All-Ireland final.
  - 1950-1954: The respective Munster and Leinster champions played the Connacht champions on an alternate basis every second year in a lone All-Ireland semi-final. The other team advanced directly to the All-Ireland final.
  - 1955: The Munster and Leinster champions contested a lone All-Ireland semi-final. Galway received a bye into the All-Ireland final.
  - 1956-1957: The respective Munster and Leinster champions played the Connacht champions on an alternate basis every second year in a lone All-Ireland semi-final. The other team advanced directly to the All-Ireland final.
  - 1958: The Munster and Leinster champions contested a lone All-Ireland semi-final. Galway received a bye into the All-Ireland final.
  - 1959-1968: The respective Munster and Leinster champions advanced directly to the All-Ireland final.
  - 1959-1969: Galway were permitted to compete in the Munster championship.
  - 1969: The Leinster champions played London in a lone All-Ireland semi-final. The Munster champions advanced directly to the All-Ireland final.
  - 1970: The three provincial winners from Connacht, Leinster and Munster were drawn against each other in two All-Ireland semi-finals with the Munster and Leinster winners being kept apart. The two winners contested the All-Ireland final.
  - 1971: Galway played the Ulster champions in a lone All-Ireland quarter-final. The winners of this game played the Munster champions in one of the All-Ireland semi-finals. The Leinster champions played London in the second All-Ireland semi-final.
  - 1972: Galway played the Ulster champions in a lone All-Ireland quarter-final. The winners of this game played the Leinster champions in one of the All-Ireland semi-finals. The Munster champions played London in the second All-Ireland semi-final.
  - 1973: Galway played London in a lone All-Ireland quarter-final. The winners of this game played the Munster champions in a lone All-Ireland semi-final. The Leinster advanced directly to the All-Ireland final.
  - 1974-1982: Galway played the All-Ireland 'B' champions in a lone All-Ireland quarter-final. The respective Munster and Leinster champions played the winners of this game on an alternate basis every second year in a lone All-Ireland semi-final. The other team advanced directly to the All-Ireland final.
  - 1983: The Ulster champions played the All-Ireland 'B' champions in a preliminary round game. The winners of this game played Galway in a lone All-Ireland quarter-final. The Munster champions played the winners of this game in a lone All-Ireland semi-final. The Leinster champions advanced directly to the All-Ireland final.
  - 1984-1995: Galway or the Ulster champions played the All-Ireland 'B' champions in a lone All-Ireland quarter-final. The winners of this game advanced to the All-Ireland semi-final where they played the respective Munster or Leinster champions on an alternate basis every second year.
  - 1996: New York played London in a preliminary round game. The winners of this game played the All-Ireland 'B' champions in another preliminary round game. The winners of this game played the Connacht champions in a lone All-Ireland quarter-final. The winners of this game contested an All-Ireland semi-final with the Leinster champions. The Munster and Ulster champions contested the second All-Ireland semi-final.
- 1997-2001: Knockout format for all teams based on the provincial system. The defeated Munster and Leinster finalists allowed back into the championship at the All-Ireland quarter-final stage where they were drawn against the Connacht and Ulster champions.
- 2002-2004: Knockout format for all teams based on the provincial system. Once a team was defeated in either the Munster or Leinster championships they were given a second chance to compete for the All-Ireland title via the 'qualifiers system'.
- 2005-2007: Knockout format for all teams based on the provincial system. The Leinster and Munster champions and runners-up advanced directly to the All-Ireland quarter-finals. The three remaining teams in Leinster and Munster joined Galway and Antrim in the eight-county All-Ireland qualifier series. The eight qualifier teams were divided into two groups of four teams each, with each team playing three games. The top two teams in each group went through to the All-Ireland quarter-finals.
- 2008–present: Knockout format for all teams based on the provincial system. The respective Munster and Leinster champions advanced directly to two separate All-Ireland semi-finals while the two runners-up advanced directly to two lone All-Ireland quarter-finals. The qualifiers were operated on a staggered system involving four phases and two lone All-Ireland quarter-finals.
  - 2009: Galway and Antrim were permitted to compete in the Leinster championship.
  - 2016: Kerry become first Munster county to compete in the Leinster championship.

== Sources ==
- Corry, Eoghan, The GAA Book of Lists (Hodder Headline Ireland, 2005).
- Donegan, Des, The Complete Handbook of Gaelic Games (DBA Publications Limited, 2005).
- Nolan, Pat, Flashbacks: A Half Century of Cork Hurling (The Collins Press, 2000).
- Sweeney, Éamonn, Munster Hurling Legends (The O'Brien Press, 2002).
