= J. J. Brennan =

Irish hurler

Personal information
- Native name: Seán Séamus Ó Braonáin (Irish)
- Born: John James Brennan; 28 November 1887 Kilkenny, Ireland
- Died: 11 October 1943 (aged 55) Kilkenny, Ireland
- Occupation: Doctor

Sport
- Sport: Hurling
Club
- Years: Club
- Erin's Owm
Club titles
- Kilkenny titles: 2
Inter-county
- Years: County
- 1905-1914: Kilkenny
Inter-county titles
- Leinster titles: 4
- All-Irelands: 4

John James Brennan (Irish: Seán Séamus Ó Braonáin) (28 November 1887 – 11 October 1943) was a famous Irish sportsman who played hurling with Kilkenny. In a senior inter-county career that lasted from 1905 until 1914, he won four All-Ireland titles and four Leinster titles. He was successful also in playing rugby, winning the Leinster Junior Cup with Kilkenny in 1920.

He played during Kilkenny's greatest era, which lasted from 1904 to 1913. He played in the All-Ireland Senior Hurling Championship in 1905, 1911, 1912, 1913.

Brennan was a doctor who worked in Kilkenny, as a ship's surgeon with the Cunard Line on the Mauretania, and later in London, before returning to Kilkenny, where he died in 1944.
