= Tom McGrath (Limerick hurler) =

Irish hurler

Personal information
- Native name: Tomás Mac Craith (Irish)
- Born: 1891 Limerick, Ireland
- Died: Unknown

Sport
- Sport: Hurling
- Position: Right corner-forward
Club
- Years: Club
- Claughaun
Club titles
- Limerick titles: 5
Inter-county
- Years: County
- 1918–1923: Limerick
Inter-county titles
- Munster titles: 3
- All-Irelands: 2

Thomas McGrath (1891 – 31 May 1958) was an Irish hurler who played as a right corner-forward for the Limerick senior team.

Born in Limerick, McGrath first arrived on the inter-county scene at the age of twenty seven when he first linked up with the Limerick senior team. He made his senior debut in the 1918 championship. McGrath went on to play a key part for Limerick during a golden age for the team, and won two All-Ireland medals and three Munster medals. He was an All-Ireland runner-up on one occasion.

At club level McGrath won five championship medals with Claughaun.

== Honours ==
=== Team ===
Young Irelands

- Limerick Senior Hurling Championship (5): 1914, 1915, 1916, 1918, 1926

Limerick

- All-Ireland Senior Hurling Championship (2): 1918, 1921
- Munster Senior Hurling Championship (3): 1918, 1921, 1923
