= Ned Cregan =

Irish hurler

Personal information
- Native name: Éamonn Ó Criagáin (Irish)
- Born: 1901 Monagea, County Limerick, Ireland
- Died: August 1972 (aged 70–71) Limerick, Ireland

Sport
- Sport: Hurling
- Position: Left wing-forward
Club
- Years: Club
- 1919-1936: Newcastle West
Club titles
- Limerick titles: 0
Inter-county
- Years: County
- 1928-1936: Limerick
Inter-county titles
- Munster titles: 3
- All-Irelands: 1
- NHL: 2

Edmond "Ned" Cregan (25 January 1901 – 23 August 1972) was an Irish hurler who played as a left wing-forward for the Limerick senior team.

Cregan joined the team during the 1928 championship and was a regular member of the starting fifteen until his retirement prior to the start of the 1936 championship. During that time he won one All-Ireland medal, three Munster medals and two National Hurling League medals. Cregan was an All-Ireland runner-up on two occasions.

At club level Cregan enjoyed a lengthy career with Newcastle West.

Cregan's son, Éamonn, was an All-Ireland medallist with Limerick in 1973. His other sons, Mickey and Conor, also played with Limerick.

== Playing career ==
=== Club ===
Cregan played his club hurling with Newcastle West and enjoyed some success during a career that spanned three decades.

His activities during the War of Independence impacted on his club hurling career, however, he won a number of West Limerick championship medals during the club's most successful period.

=== Inter-county ===
Cregan first came to prominence on the inter-county scene as a member of the Limerick junior hurling team in 1927. It was a successful year for the team as a 4-4 to 2-2 defeat of Clare in the decider gave him a Munster medal. Limerick were later defeated by Meath in the "home" All-Ireland final.

The following year Cregan made his debut in the senior ranks with Limerick. The team had gone into decline since last winning the provincial crown in 1923 as Cork dominated the southern province in the late twenties.

In 1933 Limerick made the breakthrough. A 3-7 to 2-2 defeat of Waterford gave Cregan his first Munster medal. Although the game was played in Thurles the result was decided in Clonmel as the game had to be abandoned because of a pitch invasion. Since Limerick were winning the game comfortably the Munster Council decided to award the Munster title to Limerick. Cregan's side subsequently faced reigning champions Kilkenny in the All-Ireland decider. The game was a close one; however, Kilkenny sealed the victory with a great solo-run goal by Johnny Dunne in the last ten minutes. A 1-7 to 0-6 score line gave Kilkenny a second consecutive All-Ireland victory.

1934 began with Limerick bouncing back from this defeat by claiming the National Hurling League title. Cregan later collected a second Munster medal following a 4-8 to 2-5 defeat of Waterford. Dublin provided Limerick's opposition in the subsequent All-Ireland final and, as it turned out, the game was a dramatic spectacle. Dublin trailed by five points with five minutes left, however, they fought back to draw 2-7 to 3-4. The replay turned out to be an even closer affair as well with both sides level with two minutes to go. Points from Mick Mackey and Jackie O'Connell and a fourth goal from Dave Clohessy secured a 5-2 to 2-6 victory for Limerick and an All-Ireland medal for Cregan.

Cregan captured a second consecutive National League medal in 1935 before Limerick completely powered their way through the provincial series of games. A 5-5 to 1-4 defeat of Tipperary in the provincial decider gave him a third successive Munster medal. Kilkenny turned out to be Limerick's opponents in the subsequent All-Ireland final and, once again, the game was a close affair. Limerick were the red-hot favourites as they were the reigning National League and All-Ireland champions and had played a remarkable 31 games without defeat. In spite of rain falling throughout the entire game both sides served up a great game. At the beginning of the second-half Lory Meagher sent over a huge point from midfield giving Kilkenny a lead which they would not surrender. Mick Mackey smashed a free to the net, however, his final attack to secure a win was foiled by Paddy Larkin. Kilkenny held on to win the game on a score line of 2-5 to 2-4.

Cregan retired from hurling following the completion of a tour of the United States in early 1936
