= 1921 All-Ireland Senior Hurling Championship final =

1921 All-Ireland Senior Hurling Final
- Event: 1921 All-Ireland Senior Hurling Championship
Limerick	Dublin
8-5	3-2
- Date: 4 March 1923
- Venue: Croke Park, Dublin
- Referee: Willie Walsh (Waterford)
- Attendance: 19,000
- Weather: Bright and cold

The 1921 All-Ireland Senior Hurling Championship Final was the 34th final of the All-Ireland Senior Hurling Championship, the top inter-county hurling competition in Ireland. The match was contested between Dublin and Limerick at Croke Park on 4 March 1923. Not only was it the first All-Ireland final to feature the two teams, but it was also their first championship meeting.

Dublin, composed entirely of players from the Faughs club, reached the final by defeating Meath, Laois and Kilkenny in the Leinster Championship before receiving a bye in the All-Ireland semi-final. By contrast, Limerick only had defeat Cork in the Munster Championship before defeating Galway in the All-Ireland semi-final.

The match was won by Limerick, their third All-Ireland title and their first since 1918. Limerick dominated the entire match with captain Bob McConkey scoring four goals and Willie Gleeson and Tom Grath bagging two each. Bob Mockler and Mick Neville scored a goal each for Dublin, while their third came as a result of a goalmouth melee.

The Liam MacCarthy Cup was presented for the first time in 1923, to the winning team from this match.

== Pre-match ==
Dublin played in the All-Ireland final for the third successive year and for the tenth time overall since their first appearance in 1889. They had three wins from those appearances (1889, 1917 and 1920). Limerick were playing in their third All-Ireland final since their inaugural appearance in 1897. They had never lost a final, with their second victory coming in 1918.

Admission to the ground was 1/- (one shilling) and 2/- (two shillings) for adults and 6d (six pence) for schoolboys. The gate receipts were £1,680.

The crowd were entertained by the Transport Workers Band and the Artane Boys' Band.

== Match details ==
4 March 1923

Limerick	8-5 – 3-2	Dublin

Croke Park, Dublin
Attendance: 19,000
Referee: W Walsh (Waterford)

Limerick	Dublin
