= Noel Sands =

Irish hurler

Personal information
- Native name: Nollaig de Sand (Irish)
- Born: 1968 (age 57–58) Portaferry, County Down, Northern Ireland
- Height: 5 ft 9 in (175 cm)

Sport
- Sport: Hurling
- Position: Left wing-forward
Club
- Years: Club
- Portaferry
Club titles
- Down titles: 8
Inter-county
Years	County	Apps (scores)
1985-2003	Down	23 (11-59)
Inter-county titles
- Ulster titles: 3
- All-Irelands: 0
- NHL: 2 (Div 3)
- All Stars: 0

Noel Sands (born 1968) is an Irish former hurler who played as a left wing-forward for the Down senior team.

After making his first appearance for the team during the 1985-86 National League, Sands later became a regular member of the starting fifteen until his retirement prior to the 2003 National League. During that time he won three Ulster medals and was a three-time All-Star nominee.

At club level Sands is an eight-time county club championship medalist. Sands son Eoghan was part of the Down Minor Hurling team that won the Ulster Minor Hurling Championship and League in 2012.

== Honours ==
- Down Senior Hurling Championship (8): 1988 1989 1991 1996 2000 2001 2002 2006
- Ulster Senior Hurling Championship (3): 1992 (C) 1995 1997
- National Hurling League Division 3 (2): 1987 1989
- Antrim Senior Hurling League (2) 2002 2003

Sporting positions
Preceded by	Down Senior Hurling Captain; 1992	Succeeded by
