= Mick Daniels =

Irish hurler

Personal information
- Native name: Mícheál Ó Dónaill (Irish)
- Born: Michael O'Donnell; 13 November 1905 Carrick-on-Suir, County Tipperary, Ireland
- Died: 12 May 1995 (aged 89) Dublin, Ireland
- Occupation: Army officer
- Height: 5 ft 7 in (170 cm)

Sport
- Sport: Hurling
- Position: Midfield
Club
- Years: Club
- Army Metro
Club titles
- Dublin titles: 3
Inter-county
- Years: County
- 1930-1932 1933 1934-1939: Dublin; Tipperary; Dublin
Inter-county titles
- Leinster titles: 3
- All-Irelands: 1
- NHL: 1

Michael Daniels (13 October 1905 – 12 May 1995) was an Irish hurler and trainer. At club level he played with Army Metro, while he was also a member of the Dublin senior hurling team.

== Club career ==
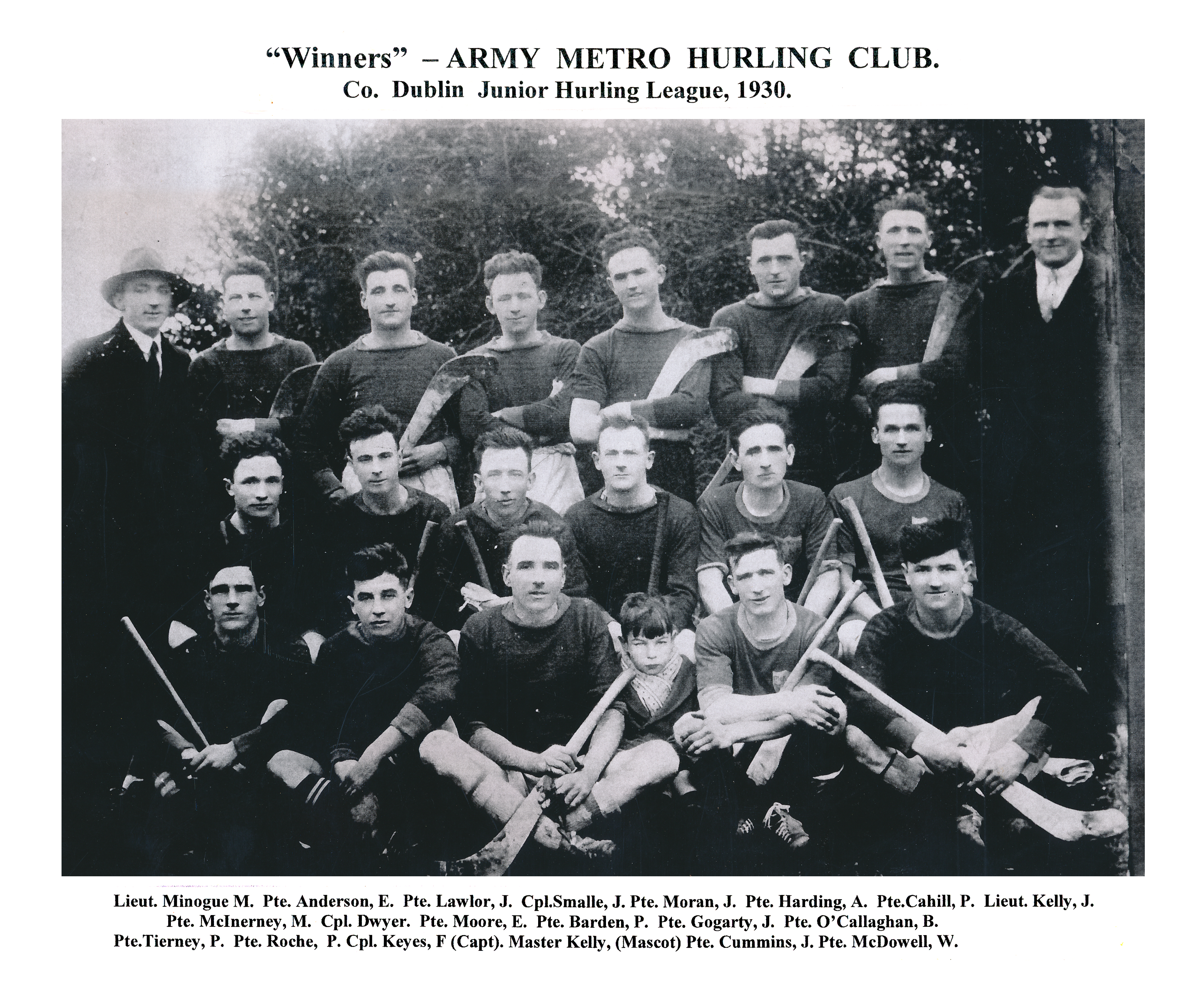

Growing up in Carrick-on-Suir where they was no organised hurling, Daniels first played hurling in nearby Templeorum, County Kilkenny. He played junior hurling in this area in the early 1920s before his army career brought him to Kilkenny. Daniels moved to Collins Barracks in Dublin in 1926 and quickly formed a hurling club there. They amalgamated with McKee Barracks three years later under the banner of Army Metro. Daniels won Dublin SHC medals after defeats of Garda in 1933, University College Dublin in 1935 and Young Irelands in 1938 as team captain.

== Inter-county career ==
Daniels first played at inter-county level with Dublin senior hurling team when he was listed amongst the substitutes for the 1930 All-Ireland final against Tipperary. He was one of two substitutes introduced during the 5-06 to 3-06 defeat. Daniels late spent one year playing with the Tipperary senior hurling team before returning to Dublin.

Daniels won his second Leinster SHC medal - his first on the field of play - in 1934. He was later at midfield when Dublin suffered a 5-02 to 2-06 defeat by Limerick in the 1934 All-Ireland final replay. Daniels was later appointed team captain and won his third Leinster SHC medal in that role in 1938. He subsequently guided the team to the All-Ireland SHC title after a 2-05 to 1-06 defeat of Waterford in the final. Daniels contemplated retirement from the game but returned to captain the team to the National Hurling League title in 1939.

== Inter-provincial career ==
Daniels's performances at inter-county level resulted in his selection for the Leinster inter-provincial team. He won Railway Cup medals after a defeats of Munster in 1933 and 1936.

== Coaching career ==
Daniel's had only retired from inter-county hurling when he took over as trainer of the Dublin senior team. He guided the team to the Leinster SHC title after a defeat of Kilkenny in 1942. Dublin later lost the 1942 All-Ireland final to Cork by 2-14 to 3-04.

== Honours ==
=== Player ===
Army Metro

- Dublin Senior Hurling Championship: 1933, 1935, 1938

Dublin

- All-Ireland Senior Hurling Championship: 1938 (c)
- Leinster Senior Hurling Championship: 1930, 1934, 1938 (c)
- National Hurling League: 1938–39

Leinster

- Railway Cup: 1933, 1936

=== Management ===
Dublin

- Leinster Senior Hurling Championship: 1941

Sporting positions
Preceded by	Dublin Senior Hurling Captain; 1938	Succeeded by
Achievements
Preceded by Jimmy Lanigan	All-Ireland Senior Hurling Final winning captain 1938	Succeeded by Jimmy Walsh
