= Liam MacCarthy Cup =

Irish senior hurling trophy

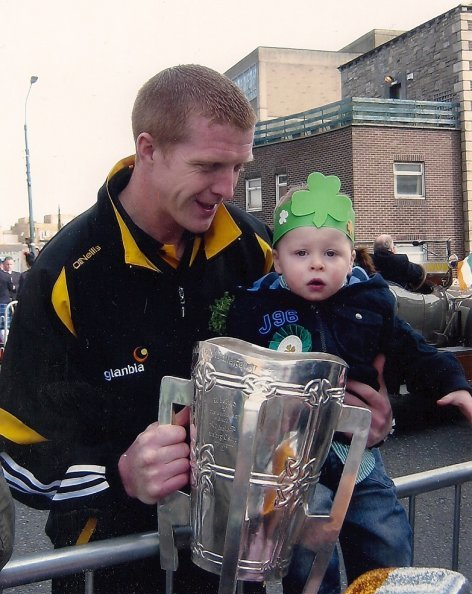
Henry Shefflin (Kilkenny) with the Liam MacCarthy Cup, 2009

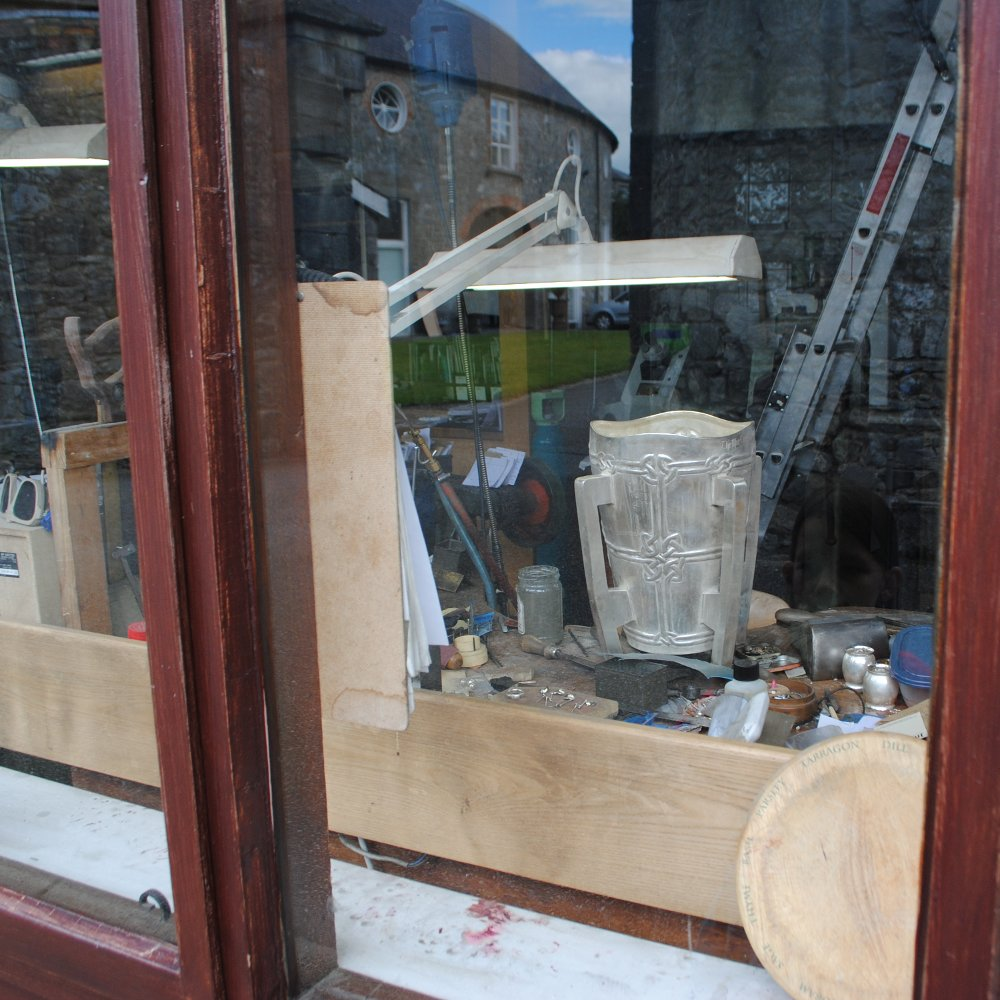
Cup being repaired before the 2011 All-Ireland Senior Hurling Championship Final

The Liam MacCarthy Cup (Irish: Corn Liam Mhic Cárthaigh) is a trophy awarded annually by the Gaelic Athletic Association (GAA) to the team that wins the All-Ireland Senior Hurling Championship. Based on the design of a mediaeval drinking vessel, the silver trophy was first awarded in 1923 to the winners of the (delayed) 1921 All-Ireland Senior Hurling Championship Final. The original 1920s trophy was retired in the 1990s, and a new, identical trophy has been awarded annually since 1992. The original trophy is on permanent display in the GAA Museum at Croke Park in Dublin.

The GAA organises the series of games which are played during the summer months. The All-Ireland Hurling Final was traditionally played on the first or second Sunday in September at Croke Park in Dublin. In 2018, the GAA rescheduled its calendar and since then the fixture has been played in July or August.

The original Liam MacCarthy Cup commemorates the memory of Liam MacCarthy. Born in London to Irish parents in 1853, he was prominently involved in the establishment of a GAA county board in London in the 1890s. In 1922, a trophy in his honour was presented to the Central Council of the GAA, and replaced the Great Southern Cup as the All-Ireland trophy.

The Liam MacCarthy Cup's design is based on a medieval Irish drinking vessel called a mether. It was first presented in 1923 - to the Limerick team which defeated Dublin in the 1921 All-Ireland Senior Hurling Championship Final (owing to the political situation in Ireland at the time, the 1921 final was not actually played until March 1923. Hence, though not first presented until 1923, the 1921 All-Ireland hurling champions are noted as first recipients of the Liam MacCarthy Cup.)

Cork won the old trophy on the most occasions. They also were the only team to win it on four consecutive occasions, achieving the feat during the 1940s (1941, 1942, 1943, 1944). Jack Lynch, who went on to become his nation's Head of Government, played in all four of these finals and captained the team in the first of them.

In addition, Cork twice won the old trophy on three consecutive occasions, in the 1950s (1952, 1953, 1954) and in the 1970s (1976, 1977, 1978). They also won it on two consecutive occasions in the late-1920s (1928, 1929).

Tipperary won the old trophy on three consecutive occasions (1949, 1950, 1951), as well as twice on two consecutive occasions in the 1960s (1961, 1962 & 1964, 1965).

Kilkenny thrice won the old trophy on two consecutive occasions in the early-1930s (1932, 1933), mid-1970s (1974, 1975) and early-1980s (1982, 1983).

Wexford (1955, 1956) and Galway (1987, 1988) each claimed the old trophy on consecutive occasions.

1992 brought the retirement of the original Liam MacCarthy Cup. It is permanently on display in the GAA Museum at Croke Park.

== New trophy ==
The GAA commissioned a replica from silversmith James M. Kelly. The silver for the new cup was donated by Johnson Matthey Ireland at the behest of Kieran D. Eustace Managing Director, a native of Newtowncashel Co. Longford. Tipperary were the last team to claim the original. In 1992, an exact replica was produced and has been awarded on an annual basis since then. Kilkenny were the first team to win the "new" MacCarthy Cup. Kilkenny are also the team to have won the new trophy on the most occasions and were the only team to have won it four consecutive times (2006, 2007, 2008, 2009) until Limerick emulated the feat (2020, 2021, 2022, 2023).

All-Ireland winners are permitted to keep the trophy for a period of one year until the following year's All-Ireland final. All-Ireland-winning captains receive a model replica of the Liam MacCarthy Cup. The trophy is currently held by Limerick.

In 2010, the GAA asked the same silversmith to produce another replica of the trophy (the third Liam MacCarthy Cup), although this was to be used only for marketing purposes. However, in 2025 it was awarded to Tipperary captain Ronan Maher after the All-Ireland final.

== Eligible teams ==
The Liam MacCarthy Cup is the trophy awarded to the victors in Tier 1 of the All-Ireland Senior Hurling Championship. Twelve teams are eligible for this trophy; the five from the Leinster Senior Hurling Championship and the five from the Munster Senior Hurling Championship, as well as two teams invited from the Tier 2 Joe McDonagh Cup (the winner of the Joe McDonagh Cup in turn replaces Tier 1's bottom team via a system of promotion and relegation). In 2019 the twelve teams to participate are as follows:

"Leinster" contingent:

- Carlow (R)
- Dublin
- Galway
- Kilkenny
- Wexford

Munster contingent:

- Clare
- Cork
- Limerick
- Tipperary
- Waterford

via the Joe McDonagh Cup

- Laois (P)
- Westmeath

== Winners ==
See All-Ireland Senior Hurling Championship for a list of all-time winners of the competition.

Old Trophy

- Cork – 1926, 1928, 1929, 1931, 1941, 1942, 1943, 1944, 1946, 1952, 1953, 1954, 1966, 1970, 1976, 1977, 1978, 1984, 1986, 1990
- Kilkenny – 1922, 1932, 1933, 1935, 1939, 1947, 1957, 1963, 1967, 1969, 1972, 1974, 1975, 1979, 1982, 1983
- Tipperary – 1925, 1930, 1937, 1945, 1949, 1950, 1951, 1958, 1961, 1962, 1964, 1965, 1971, 1989, 1991
- Limerick – 1921, 1934, 1936, 1940, 1973
- Galway – 1923, 1980, 1987, 1988
- Wexford – 1955, 1956, 1960, 1968
- Dublin – 1924, 1927, 1938
- Waterford – 1948, 1959
- Offaly – 1981, 1985
- Clare – 1914

New Trophy

- Kilkenny – 1992, 1993, 2000, 2002, 2003, 2006, 2007, 2008, 2009, 2011, 2012, 2014, 2015
- Limerick – 2018, 2020, 2021, 2022, 2023, 2026
- Tipperary – 2001, 2010, 2016, 2019, 2025
- Clare – 1995, 1997, 2013, 2024
- Cork – 1999, 2004, 2005
- Offaly – 1994, 1998
- Wexford – 1996
- Galway – 2017

== See also ==
- List of All-Ireland Senior Hurling Championship finals
- List of All-Ireland Senior Hurling Championship winning captains
- Sam Maguire Cup
