= 1921 All-Ireland Senior Hurling Championship =

Championship details
- Dates: 8 May 1921 – 4 March 1923
- Teams: 9

All-Ireland champions
- Winning team: Limerick (3rd win)
- Captain: Bob McConkey

All-Ireland Finalists
- Losing team: Dublin
- Captain: Bob Mockler

Provincial champions
- Munster: Limerick
- Leinster: Dublin
- Ulster: Not Played
- Connacht: Not Played

Championship statistics
- No. matches played: 8
- Goals total: 57
- Points total: 48
- All-Star Team: See here

The All-Ireland Senior Hurling Championship 1921 was the 35th staging of the All-Ireland Senior Hurling Championship, the Gaelic Athletic Association's premier inter-county hurling tournament. The championship ran from 8 May 1921 to 4 March 1923.

Dublin were the defending champions.

The All-Ireland final was played at Croke Park in Dublin on 4 March 1923 between Limerick and Dublin, in what was their first ever championship meeting. Limerick won the match by 8–05 to 3–02 to claim their third All-Ireland title overall and a first title in three years.

== Leinster Senior Hurling Championship ==
=== Leinster first round ===
5 June 1921 First round	Meath	4–04 – 2–06	Westmeath	Killucan Grounds

=== Leinster second round ===
31 July 1921 Second round	Dublin	8–03 – 2–02	Meath	Croke Park

=== Leinster semi-finals ===
14 August 1921 Semi-final	Dublin	3–03 – 2–05	Laois	Croke Park

14 August 1921 Semi-final	Wexford	1–02 – 5–01	Kilkenny	New Ross Grounds

=== Leinster final ===
11 September 1921 Final	Dublin	4–04 – 1–05	Kilkenny	Croke Park

== Munster Senior Hurling Championship ==
=== Munster final ===
28 May 1922 Final	Limerick	5–02 – 1–02	Cork	Thurles Sportsfield

== All-Ireland Senior Hurling Championship ==
=== All-Ireland semi-final ===
25 June 1922 Semi-final	Limerick	6–00 – 2–02	Galway	Markets Field

=== All-Ireland final ===
4 March 1923 Final	Limerick	8–05 – 3–02	Dublin	Croke Park
	B McConkey 4–0, W Gleeson 2–2, T McGrath 2–1, W Hough 0–1, G Howard 0–1		B Mockler 1–1, M Neville 1–0, Unknown 1–0, T Hayes 0–1	Attendance: 19,000; Referee: W Walsh (Waterford)

== Sources ==
- Corry, Eoghan, The GAA Book of Lists (Hodder Headline Ireland, 2005).
- Donegan, Des, The Complete Handbook of Gaelic Games (DBA Publications Limited, 2005).
