= Micky Cross =

Irish hurler (1902–1977)

Michael Cross (4 March 1902 – 17 July 1977) was an Irish hurler who played as a right wing-back and as a left corner-back for the Limerick senior team.

Cross made his first appearance for the team during the 1923 championship and became a regular player over the next decade-and-a-half. During that time he won two All-Ireland winner's medals, five Munster winner's medals and four National Hurling League winners' medals.

At club level, Cross played with Claughaun and won two county championship winners' medals in a career that spanned three decades.

Gleeson also won four Railway Cup winners' medal when he was picked for the Munster inter-provincial teams and also represented Ireland in the Tailteann Games.
