= Dave Clohessy =

Limerick hurler

Personal information
- Native name: Daithí Ó Clochasaigh (Irish)
- Born: 1905 Fedamore, County Limerick, Ireland
- Died: 1986 (aged 80–81)

Sport
- Sport: Hurling
- Position: Full-forward
Club
- Years: Club
- 1920s–1940s: Fedamore
Club titles
- Limerick titles: 1
Inter-county
- Years: County
- 1920s–1930s: Limerick
Inter-county titles
- Munster titles: 4
- All-Irelands: 2
- NHL: 2

David Stanislaus Clohessy (13 November 1905 – 16 November 1986) was an Irish hurler who played for his local club Fedamore and at senior level for the Limerick county team in the 1920s and 1930s. In the 1934 All-Ireland final replay, he scored four goals against Dublin, a record that lasted beyond his death.

His brothers, Paddy, Andy and Jack, who predeceased him, also played for Fedamore. Paddy Clohessy later entered politics and was elected to Dáil Éireann as a Fianna Fáil Teachta Dála (TD) at the 1957 general election and held his seat until standing down at the 1969 general election.
