= List of All-Ireland Senior Hurling Championship medal winners =

This is a list of hurlers who have received a winners' medal in the All-Ireland Senior Hurling Championship.

Currently, the Gaelic Athletic Association issues 26 medals to the winning team; however, the individual county board have the option of ordering extra medals for members of the extended panel or for players who may have played during the championship but missed the final due to injury.

The winning captain is also presented with a miniature version of the Liam MacCarthy Cup.

== Winning Players ==
Player	No.	Team(s)	Championships	Notes
Henry Shefflin	10	Kilkenny	2000, 2002, 2003, 2006, 2007, 2008, 2009, 2011, 2012, 2014	Highest number of medals for a single player
J. J. Delaney	9	Kilkenny	2002, 2003, 2006, 2007, 2008, 2009, 2011, 2012, 2014	Won a medal as a non-playing substitute in 2006
Jackie Tyrrell	9	Kilkenny	2003, 2006, 2007, 2008, 2009, 2011, 2012, 2014, 2015	Won a medal as a non-playing substitute in 2003 and 2015
Noel Hickey	9	Kilkenny	2000, 2002, 2003, 2006, 2007, 2008, 2009, 2011, 2012	Won a medal as a non-playing substitute in 2009
Tommy Walsh	9	Kilkenny	2002, 2003, 2006, 2007, 2008, 2009, 2011, 2012, 2014	Won medals as a non-playing substitute in 2002 and 2014
Noel Skehan	9	Kilkenny	1963, 1967, 1969, 1972, 1974, 1975, 1979, 1982, 1983	Won medals as a non-playing substitute in 1963, 1967 and 1969
Richie Power	8	Kilkenny	2006, 2007, 2008, 2009, 2011, 2012, 2014, 2015	
Eoin Larkin	8	Kilkenny	2006, 2007, 2008, 2009, 2011, 2012, 2014, 2015	
Eddie Brennan	8	Kilkenny	2000, 2002, 2003, 2006, 2007, 2008, 2009, 2011	
Frank Cummins	8	Kilkenny	1967, 1969, 1972, 1974, 1975, 1979, 1982, 1983	Won a medal as a non-playing substitute in 1967
Michael Kavanagh	8	Kilkenny	2000, 2002, 2003, 2006, 2007, 2008, 2009, 2011	Won a medal as a non-playing substitute in 2011
Michael Fennelly	8	Kilkenny	2006, 2007, 2008, 2009, 2011, 2012, 2014, 2015	Won medals as a non-playing substitute in 2006 and 2008
Aidan Fogarty	8	Kilkenny	2003, 2006, 2007, 2008, 2009, 2011, 2012, 2014	Won medals as a non-playing substitute in 2003, 2011 & 2014
John Doyle	8	Tipperary	1949, 1950, 1951, 1958, 1961, 1962, 1964, 1965	Winner of medals in three separate decades
Christy Ring	8	Cork	1941, 1942, 1943, 1944, 1946, 1952, 1953, 1954	
Brian Hogan	7	Kilkenny	2006, 2007, 2008, 2009, 2011, 2012, 2014	Won a medal as a non-playing substitute in 2006 and 2014
Dick Doyle	7	Kilkenny	1904, 1905, 1907, 1909, 1911, 1912, 1913	
Jack Rochford	7	Kilkenny	1904, 1905, 1907, 1909, 1911, 1912, 1913	
Dick Walsh	7	Kilkenny	1904, 1905, 1907, 1909, 1911, 1912, 1913	
Sim Walton	7	Kilkenny	1904, 1905, 1907, 1909, 1911, 1912, 1913	
T. J. Reid	7	Kilkenny	2007, 2008, 2009, 2011, 2012, 2014, 2015	Won an All-Ireland medal as a non-playing substitute in 2007
Richie Hogan	7	Kilkenny	2007, 2008, 2009, 2011, 2012, 2014, 2015	Won an All-Ireland medal as a non-playing substitute in 2007 and 2008
Martin Comerford	6	Kilkenny	2002, 2003, 2006, 2007, 2008, 2009	
Ned Doyle	6	Kilkenny	1904, 1905, 1907, 1909, 1911, 1912	
Eddie Keher	6	Kilkenny	1963, 1967, 1969, 1972, 1974, 1975	
Jimmy Kelly	6	Kilkenny	1905, 1907, 1909, 1911, 1912, 1913	
Dan Kennedy	6	Kilkenny	1905, 1907, 1909, 1911, 1912, 1913	
Paddy Lanigan	6	Kilkenny	1904, 1905, 1907, 1909, 1911, 1912	
Derek Lyng	6	Kilkenny	2002, 2003, 2006, 2007, 2008, 2009	
James McGarry	6	Kilkenny	2000, 2002, 2003, 2006, 2007, 2008	Won a medal as a non-playing substitute in 2007
Jimmy Doyle	6	Tipperary	1958, 1961, 1962, 1964, 1965, 1971	Winner of medals in three separate decades
D. J. Carey	5	Kilkenny	1992, 1993, 2000, 2002, 2003	
Nicky Quaid	6	Limerick	2018, 2020, 2021, 2022, 2023, 2026	
Dan Morrissey	6	Limerick	2018, 2020, 2021, 2022, 2023, 2026	
Barry Nash	6	Limerick	2018, 2020, 2021, 2022, 2023, 2026	
Diarmaid Byrnes	6	Limerick	2018, 2020, 2021, 2022, 2023, 2026	
Kyle Hayes	6	Limerick	2018, 2020, 2021, 2022, 2023, 2026	
William O'Donoghue	6	Limerick	2018, 2020, 2021, 2022, 2023, 2026	
Darragh O'Donovan	6	Limerick	2018, 2020, 2021, 2022, 2023, 2026	
Gearóid Hegarty	6	Limerick	2018, 2020, 2021, 2022, 2023, 2026	
Tom Morrissey	6	Limerick	2018, 2020, 2021, 2022, 2023, 2026	
Aaron Gillane	6	Limerick	2018, 2020, 2021, 2022, 2023, 2026	
Séamus Flanagan	5	Limerick	2018, 2020, 2021, 2022, 2023	
Peter Casey	6	Limerick	2018, 2020, 2021, 2022, 2023, 2026	
Declan Hannon	5	Limerick	2018, 2020, 2021, 2022, 2023	Won a medal as a non-playing substitute in 2023
Cian Lynch	6	Limerick	2018, 2020, 2021, 2022, 2023, 2026	Won a medal as a non-playing substitute in 2022
Mike Casey	6	Limerick	2018, 2020, 2021, 2022, 2023, 2026	Won a medal as a non-playing substitute in 2020 and 2021
Seán Finn	6	Limerick	2018, 2020, 2021, 2022, 2023, 2026	Won a medal as a non-playing substitute in 2023
David Reidy	6	Limerick	2018, 2020, 2021, 2022, 2023, 2026	Won a medal as a non-playing substitute in 2018
Graeme Mulcahy	5	Limerick	2018, 2020, 2021, 2022, 2023	
Dick Doherty	5	Kilkenny	1907, 1909, 1911, 1912, 1913	
Mick Doyle	5	Kilkenny	1907, 1909, 1911, 1912, 1913	
Billy Fitzpatrick	5	Kilkenny	1974, 1975, 1979, 1982, 1983	
Matt Gargan	5	Kilkenny	1907, 1909, 1911, 1912, 1913	
Dick Grace	5	Kilkenny	1909, 1911, 1912, 1913, 1922	Winner of medals in three separate decades
Pat Henderson	5	Kilkenny	1967, 1969, 1972, 1974, 1975	
Garrett Howard	5	Limerick; Dublin	1921, 1924, 1927, 1934, 1936	With Limerick in 1921, 1934, and 1936; with Dublin in 1924 and 1927.
Jack Keoghan	5	Kilkenny	1907, 1909, 1911, 1912, 1913	
Phil Larkin	5	Kilkenny	1963, 1972, 1974, 1975, 1979	
James Fitzpatrick	5	Kilkenny	2006, 2007, 2008, 2009, 2011	Won medals as a non-playing substitute in 2009 and 2011
Alan Lotty	5	Cork	1941, 1942, 1943, 1944, 1946	
Jack Lynch	5	Cork	1941, 1942, 1943, 1944, 1946	Won a football medal in 1945
Michael Maher	5	Tipperary	1958, 1961, 1962, 1964, 1965	
Mikey Maher	5	Tipperary	1895, 1896, 1898, 1899, 1900	
Charlie McCarthy	5	Cork	1966, 1970, 1976, 1977, 1978	
Gerald McCarthy	5	Cork	1966, 1970, 1976, 1977, 1978	
Willie Murphy	5	Cork	1941, 1942, 1943, 1944, 1946	
Donie Nealon	5	Tipperary	1958, 1961, 1962, 1964, 1965	
Paddy O'Donovan	5	Cork	1941, 1942, 1943, 1944, 1946	
Paddy Ahern	5	Cork	1919, 1926, 1928, 1929, 1931	Winner of medals in three separate decades
Jimmy Barry-Murphy	5	Cork	1976, 1977, 1978, 1984, 1986	Won a football medal in 1973
Din Joe Buckley	5	Cork	1941, 1942, 1943, 1944, 1946	
Mickey Byrne	5	Tipperary	1945, 1949, 1950, 1951, 1958	
Kieran Carey	5	Tipperary	1958, 1961, 1962, 1964, 1965	
Johnny Crowley	5	Cork	1976, 1977, 1978, 1984, 1986	
Liam Devaney	5	Tipperary	1958, 1961, 1962, 1964, 1965	
Matty Power	5	Kilkenny; Dublin	1922, 1927, 1932, 1933, 1935	All Kilkenny except 1927
Tony Wall	5	Tipperary	1958, 1961, 1962, 1964, 1965	
Johnny Walsh	5	Tipperary	1895, 1896, 1898, 1899, 1900	
Tommy Doyle	5	Tipperary	1937, 1945, 1949, 1950, 1951	Winner of medals in three separate decades
Theo English	5	Tipperary	1958, 1961, 1962, 1964, 1965	
Jim Young	5	Cork	1941, 1942, 1943, 1944, 1946	
Eudie Coughlan	5	Cork	1919, 1926, 1928, 1929, 1931	Won a medal as a non-playing substitute in 1919
Mick Ahern	4	Cork	1926, 1928, 1929, 1931	
Dinny Barry-Murphy	4	Cork	1926, 1928, 1929, 1931	
J. J. Brennan	4	Kilkenny	1905, 1911, 1912, 1913	
Tony Brennan	4	Tipperary	1945, 1949, 1950, 1951	
Mick Burns	4	Tipperary	1961, 1962, 1964, 1965	
Phil Byrne	4	Tipperary	1895, 1896, 1898, 1899	
Tom Cashman	4	Cork	1977, 1978, 1984, 1986	
Martin Coogan	4	Kilkenny	1963, 1967, 1969, 1972	
Con Cottrell	4	Cork	1941, 1943, 1944, 1946	
Denis Coughlan	4	Cork	1970, 1976, 1977, 1978	Won a football medal in 1973
Mick Crotty	4	Kilkenny	1972, 1974, 1975, 1979	
Ray Cummins	4	Cork	1970, 1976, 1977, 1978	Won a football medal in 1973
Tommy Daly	4	Dublin; Clare	1917, 1920, 1924, 1927	
Pat Delaney	4	Kilkenny	1969, 1972, 1974, 1975	
Paddy Delea	4	Cork	1926, 1928, 1929, 1931	
Colin Fennelly	4	Kilkenny	2011, 2012, 2014, 2015	
Conor Fogarty	4	Kilkenny	2011, 2012, 2014, 2015	
Christy Heffernan	4	Kilkenny	1982, 1983, 1992, 1993	
John Horgan	4	Cork	1970, 1976, 1977, 1978	
Jim Hurley	4	Cork	1926, 1928, 1929, 1931	
Kieran Joyce	4	Kilkenny	2011, 2012, 2014, 2015	
Paddy Larkin	4	Kilkenny	1932, 1933, 1935, 1939	
Ed Maher	4	Tipperary	1895, 1896, 1898, 1900	
Jack Maher	4	Tipperary	1895, 1896, 1898, 1899	
John McKenna	4	Tipperary	1961, 1962, 1964, 1965	
Seán McLoughlin	4	Tipperary	1961, 1962, 1964, 1965	
Paddy Moran	4	Kilkenny	1963, 1967, 1969, 1972	
Con Murphy	4	Cork	1942, 1943, 1944, 1946	
Eoin Murphy	4	Kilkenny	2011, 2012, 2014, 2015	Won a medal as a non-playing substitute in 2011 & 2012
Paul Murphy	4	Kilkenny	2011, 2012, 2014, 2015	
Liam O'Brien	4	Kilkenny	1972, 1974, 1975, 1979	
Edward O'Connell	4	Cork	1926, 1928, 1929, 1931	
Seánie O'Leary	4	Cork	1976, 1977, 1978, 1984	
Jim O'Regan	4	Cork; Dublin	1926, 1928, 1929, 1931	
Gerry O'Riordan	4	Cork	1946, 1952, 1953, 1954	
Paddy Phelan	4	Kilkenny	1932, 1933, 1935, 1939	
John Power	4	Kilkenny	1992, 1993, 2000, 2002	
John T. Power	4	Kilkenny	1907, 1911, 1912, 1913	
Johnny Quirke	4	Cork	1941, 1942, 1943, 1944	
Lester Ryan	4	Kilkenny	2011, 2012, 2014, 2015	
Tommy Ryan	4	Tipperary	1896, 1898, 1899, 1900	
Batt Thornhill	4	Cork	1941, 1942, 1943, 1944	
Jim Treacy	4	Kilkenny	1967, 1969, 1972, 1974	
Jimmy Walsh	4	Kilkenny	1932, 1933, 1935, 1939	
Ollie Walsh	4	Kilkenny	1957, 1963, 1967, 1969	
Jack Anthony	3	Kilkenny	1904, 1905, 1907	
John McGrath	3	Tipperary	2016, 2019, 2025	
Séamus Bannon	3	Tipperary	1949, 1950, 1951	
Paddy Barry	3	Cork	1952, 1953, 1954	
Peter Barry	3	Kilkenny	2000, 2002, 2003	
Tom Barry	3	Cork	1928, 1929, 1931	
Mick Brennan	3	Kilkenny	1974, 1975, 1979	
Ned Brennan	3	Tipperary	1895, 1896, 1898	
Cillian Buckley	3	Kilkenny	2012, 2014, 2015	
Eddie Byrne	3	Kilkenny; Dublin	1932, 1933, 1935	
Podge Byrne	3	Kilkenny	1932, 1933, 1935	
Ted Carroll	3	Kilkenny	1963, 1967, 1969	
John Cashman	3	Cork	1892, 1893, 1894	
Paddy Clohessy	3	Limerick	1934, 1936, 1940	
Brian Cody	3	Kilkenny	1975, 1982, 1983	
Martin Coleman	3	Cork	1976, 1977, 1978	
Andy Comerford	3	Kilkenny	2000, 2002, 2003	
Seán Condon	3	Cork	1942, 1943, 1944	
Tim Condon	3	Tipperary	1896, 1898, 1899	
Johnny Connolly	3	Tipperary	1895, 1896, 1898	
Brian Corcoran	3	Cork	1999, 2004, 2005	
Dave Creedon	3	Cork	1952, 1953, 1954	
Mick Crotty	3	Kilkenny	1974, 1975, 1979	
Tim Crowley	3	Cork	1977, 1978, 1984	
Ger Cunningham	3	Cork	1984, 1986, 1990	
Donal Óg Cusack	3	Cork	1999, 2004, 2005	
Willie John Daly	3	Cork	1952, 1953, 1954	
Joe Deane	3	Cork	1999, 2004, 2005	
Will Devane	3	Tipperary	1895, 1896, 1898	
Pa Dillon	3	Kilkenny	1967, 1969, 1972	
Bob Doherty	3	Clare; Dublin	1914, 1920, 1924	
Joe Dooley	3	Offaly	1985, 1994, 1998	
Jim English	3	Wexford	1955, 1956, 1960	
Ger Fennelly	3	Kilkenny	1979, 1982, 1983	
Liam Fennelly	3	Kilkenny	1982, 1983, 1992	
Jimmy Finn	3	Tipperary	1950, 1951, 1958	
Tim Flood	3	Wexford	1955, 1956, 1960	
Matty Fouhy	3	Cork	1952, 1953, 1954	
Mick Gill	3	Galway; Dublin	1923, 1924, 1927	
Pierce Grace	3	Kilkenny	1911, 1912, 1913	Won football medals with Dublin in 1906 and 1907
Conor Hayes	3	Galway	1980, 1987, 1988	
Martin Hayes	3	Dublin	1917, 1920, 1927	
Ger Henderson	3	Kilkenny	1979, 1982, 1983	
John Henderson	3	Kilkenny	1979, 1982, 1983	
Joe Hennessy	3	Kilkenny	1979, 1982, 1983	
Kevin Hennessy	3	Cork	1984, 1986, 1990	
John Hough	3	Tipperary	1951, 1958, 1961	
John Hoyne	3	Kilkenny	2000, 2002, 2003	
Padge Kehoe	3	Wexford	1955, 1956, 1960	
Mick Kennedy	3	Limerick	1934, 1936, 1940	
Paddy Kenny	3	Tipperary	1949, 1950, 1951	
Seán Kenny	3	Tipperary	1949, 1950, 1951	
Noel Lane	3	Galway	1980, 1987, 1988	
Pat Lawlor	3	Kilkenny	1972, 1974, 1975	
Tommy Leahy	3	Kilkenny	1932, 1933, 1935	
Sylvie Linnane	3	Galway	1980, 1987, 1988	
John Lyons	3	Cork	1952, 1953, 1954	
John Mackey	3	Limerick	1934, 1936, 1940	
Mick Mackey	3	Limerick	1934, 1936, 1940	
Morgan Madden	3	Cork	1928, 1929, 1931	
John Maher	3	Tipperary	1930, 1937, 1945	
Sonny Maher	3	Tipperary	1949, 1950, 1951	
Timmy McCarthy	3	Cork	1999, 2004, 2005	
Dermot McCurtain	3	Cork	1977, 1978, 1984	
Lory Meagher	3	Kilkenny	1932, 1933, 1935	
Bob Mockler	3	Tipperary; Dublin	1917, 1920, 1924	Also won a medal as a non-playing substitute in 1908
Jim Morrissey	3	Wexford	1955, 1956, 1960	
Mick Morrissey	3	Wexford	1955, 1956, 1960	
Pat Moylan	3	Cork	1976, 1977, 1978	
Tom Mulcahy	3	Cork	1943, 1944, 1946	
Tomás Mulcahy	3	Cork	1984, 1986, 1990	
Richie Mullally	3	Kilkenny	2002, 2003, 2006	
Brian Murphy	3	Cork	1976, 1977, 1978	Won a football medal in 1973
Gerald Murphy	3	Cork	1952, 1953, 1954	
Seán Óg Murphy	3	Cork	1919, 1926, 1928	
Seán Óg Ó hAilpín	3	Cork	1999, 2004, 2005	
Seán O'Brien	3	Cork	1946, 1952, 1954	
Jimmy O'Connell	3	Kilkenny	1933, 1935, 1939	
Mick O'Connell	3	Cork	1928, 1929, 1931	
Ben O'Connor	3	Cork	1999, 2004, 2005	
John O'Connor	3	Cork	1892, 1893, 1894	
Willie O'Connor	3	Kilkenny	1992, 1993, 2000	
Martin O'Doherty	3	Cork	1976, 1977, 1978	
Nick O'Donnell	3	Wexford	1955, 1956, 1960	
Peter O'Grady	3	Cork	1928, 1929, 1931	
Dick O'Hara	3	Kilkenny	1979, 1982, 1983	
Joe O'Keeffe	3	Tipperary	1898, 1899, 1900	
Peter O'Reilly	3	Kilkenny	1932, 1933, 1935	
Tony O'Shaughnessy	3	Cork	1952, 1953, 1954	
Diarmuid O'Sullivan	3	Cork	1999, 2004, 2005	
Tony O'Sullivan	3	Cork	1984, 1986, 1990	
Joe Phelan	3	Laois; Dublin	1915, 1917, 1920	
Paddy Prendergast	3	Kilkenny	1979, 1982, 1983	
Kieran Purcell	3	Kilkenny	1972, 1974, 1975	
Billy Rackard	3	Wexford	1955, 1956, 1960	
Tony Reddin	3	Tipperary	1949, 1950, 1951	
Jim Roche	3	Limerick	1934, 1936, 1940	
Mick Roche	3	Tipperary	1964, 1965, 1971	
Declan Ryan	3	Tipperary	1989, 1991, 2001	
Mick Ryan	3	Tipperary	1949, 1950, 1951	
P. J. Ryan	3	Kilkenny	2007, 2008, 2009	
Timmy Ryan	3	Limerick	1934, 1936, 1940	
Tom Semple	3	Tipperary	1900, 1906, 1908	
Phil Shanahan	3	Tipperary	1949, 1950, 1951	
Hugh Shelly	3	Tipperary	1906, 1908, 1916	
Pat Stakelum	3	Tipperary	1949, 1950, 1951	
D.J. Stapleton	3	Kilkenny	1904, 1905, 1907	
John Tennyson	3	Kilkenny	2006, 2007, 2009	
Vincy Twomey	3	Cork	1952, 1953, 1954	
Mike Wall	3	Tipperary	1896, 1899, 1900	
Jim Walsh	3	Dublin	1920, 1924, 1927	
Walter Walsh	3	Kilkenny	2012, 2014, 2015	
Ned Wheeler	3	Wexford	1955, 1956, 1960	
Martin White	3	Kilkenny	1932, 1933, 1935	
Ned Tobin	3	Dublin	1917, 1920, 1927	Won a medal as a non-playing substitute in 1917
Pat Aylward	2	Kilkenny; Dublin	1922, 1924	
Tom Allen	2	Tipperary	1900, 1906	
Ollie Baker	2	Clare	1995, 1997	
Joe Bannon	2	Dublin	1924, 1927	
Paddy Barry	2	Cork	1966, 1970	
Tom Barry	2	Dublin	1924, 1927	
Brendan Bermingham	2	Offaly	1981, 1985	
Peter Blanchfield	2	Kilkenny	1935, 1939	
Colm Bonnar	2	Tipperary	1989, 1991	
Conal Bonnar	2	Tipperary	1989, 1991	
Cormac Bonnar	2	Tipperary	1989, 1991	
Jamesie Brennan	2	Kilkenny	1992, 1993	
Kieran Brennan	2	Kilkenny	1982, 1983	
Micka Brennan	2	Cork	1941, 1943	
Nickey Brennan	2	Kilkenny	1979, 1982	
Paddy Brolan	2	Tipperary	1906, 1908	
John Browne	2	Cork	1999, 2004	
Pat Buckley	2	Cork	1890, 1892	
Frank Burke	2	Dublin	1917, 1920	
Jimmy Burke	2	Tipperary	1906, 1908	
Miah Burke	2	Cork	1928, 1929	
Paddy Burke	2	Tipperary	1906, 1908	
Tom Butler	2	Tipperary	1930, 1937	
Jim Buttimer	2	Cork	1941, 1942	
Phil Cahill	2	Tipperary	1925, 1930	
John Joe Callanan	2	Dublin; Tipperary	1920, 1930	
Declan Carr	2	Tipperary	1989, 1991	
Charlie Carter	2	Kilkenny	2000, 2002	
Jim Cashman	2	Cork	1986, 1990	
Conor Clancy	2	Clare	1995, 1997	
James Cleary	2	Dublin	1917, 1920	
Michael Cleary	2	Tipperary	1989, 1991	
Séamus Cleere	2	Kilkenny	1963, 1967	
Dave Clohessy	2	Limerick	1934, 1936	
Seán Clohessy	2	Kilkenny	1957, 1963	
Flor Coffey	2	Tipperary	1945, 1949	
Paddy Collins	2	Cork	1929, 1931	
John Commins	2	Galway	1987, 1988	
Liam Connolly	2	Tipperary	1958, 1962	
Brendan Considine	2	Clare; Dublin	1914, 1917	
Jimmy Coogan	2	Kilkenny	2002, 2003	
Joe Cooney	2	Galway	1987, 1988	
Lar Corbett	2	Tipperary	2001, 2010	
Ger Cornally	2	Tipperary	1937, 1945	
Mark Corrigan	2	Offaly	1981, 1985	
Eugene Coughlan	2	Offaly	1981, 1985	
Ger Coughlan	2	Offaly	1981, 1985	
John Coughlan	2	Cork	1926, 1931	
Pat Coughlan	2	Cork	1893, 1894	
Tom Coughlan	2	Cork	1902, 1903	
Michael Cronin	2	Cork	1893, 1894	
Micky Cross	2	Limerick	1934, 1936	
Jack Cullinane	2	Cork	1893, 1894	
Brendan Cummins	2	Tipperary	2001, 2010	
Anthony Cunningham	2	Galway	1987, 1988	
Ronan Curran	2	Cork	2004, 2005	
Anthony Daly	2	Clare	1995, 1997	
Pat Delaney	2	Offaly	1981, 1985	
James Delea	2	Cork	1893, 1894	
Jim Dermody	2	Kilkenny	1932, 1933	
Jerry Desmond	2	Cork	1902, 1903	
Billy Dooley	2	Offaly	1994, 1998	
Johnny Dooley	2	Offaly	1994, 1998	
Liam Dowling	2	Cork	1952, 1953	
Eddie Doyle	2	Kilkenny	1932, 1933	
Liam Doyle	2	Clare	1995, 1997	
Dan Drew	2	Cork	1890, 1892	
Jack Duggan	2	Kilkenny	1933, 1935	
Claus Dunne	2	Kilkenny	1967, 1969	
Johnny Dunne	2	Kilkenny	1933, 1935	
Watty Dunne	2	Tipperary	1898, 1899	
Billy Dwyer	2	Kilkenny	1957, 1963	
Pat Dwyer	2	Kilkenny	1992, 1993	
Nicky English	2	Tipperary	1989, 1991	
John Fenton	2	Cork	1984, 1986	
Pete Finnerty	2	Galway	1987, 1988	
Tom Finlay	2	Laois; Dublin	1915, 1924	
Davy Fitzgerald	2	Clare	1995, 1997	
Ger Fitzgerald	2	Cork	1986, 1990	
Jim Flanagan	2	Tipperary	1895, 1896	
Thady Flanagan	2	Tipperary	1895, 1896	
Pat Fleury	2	Offaly	1981, 1985	
Art Foley	2	Wexford	1955, 1956	
Aidan Fogarty	2	Offaly	1981, 1985	
Pat Fox	2	Tipperary	1989, 1991	
John Gardiner	2	Cork	2004, 2005	
Len Gaynor	2	Tipperary	1965, 1971	
Bill Gleeson	2	Tipperary	1899, 1900	
Billy Gleeson	2	Tipperary	1899, 1900	
Jack Gleeson	2	Tipperary	1899, 1900	
Jack Gleeson	2	Tipperary	1906, 1908	
Tim Gleeson	2	Tipperary	1906, 1908	
Willie Gleeson	2	Limerick	1918, 1921	
Oliver Gough	2	Wexford; Kilkenny	1955, 1963	
Dick Grace	2	Kilkenny	1905, 1907	
Paddy Grace	2	Kilkenny	1939, 1947	
Martin Hanamy	2	Offaly	1994, 1998	
Josie Hartnett	2	Cork	1953, 1954	
Pat Hartnett	2	Cork	1984, 1986	
David Hayes	2	Cork	1893, 1894	
Derry Hayes	2	Cork	1953, 1954	
Paddy Healy	2	Cork	1944, 1946	
Séamus Hearne	2	Wexford	1955, 1956	
Denis Heaslip	2	Kilkenny	1957, 1963	
Christy Heffernan	2	Kilkenny	1982, 1983	
Fergal Hegarty	2	Clare	1995, 1997	
Steve Hegarty	2	Cork	1893, 1894	
Bill Hennessy	2	Kilkenny	1992, 1993	
David Herity	2	Kilkenny	2011, 2012	
Ken Hogan	2	Tipperary	1989, 1991	
Pádraig Horan	2	Offaly	1981, 1985	
Willie Hough	2	Limerick	1918, 1921	
Jack Hoyne	2	Kilkenny	1904, 1905	
Jimmy Humphreys	2	Limerick	1918, 1921	
Tony Keady	2	Galway	1987, 1988	
Jack Keane	2	Limerick	1918, 1921	
Michael Keating	2	Tipperary	1964, 1971	
Brendan Keeshan	2	Offaly	1981, 1985	
Jamesy Kelleher	2	Cork	1902, 1903	
Eoin Kelly	2	Tipperary	2001, 2010	
Jimmy Kelly	2	Kilkenny	1939, 1947	
Joe Kelly	2	Cork	1944, 1946	
Joachim Kelly	2	Offaly	1981, 1985	
Tom Kenna	2	Tipperary	1906, 1908	
Jimmy Kennedy	2	Tipperary	1949, 1950	
Martin Kennedy	2	Tipperary	1925, 1930	
Mick Kennefick	2	Cork	1942, 1943	
Tom Kenny	2	Kilkenny	1904, 1907	
Tom Kenny	2	Cork	2004, 2005	
Tom Kerwick	2	Tipperary	1906, 1908	
Larry Kiely	2	Tipperary	1964, 1965	
Ollie Kilkenny	2	Galway	1987, 1988	
Tony Kilkenny	2	Galway	1987, 1988	
Kevin Kinahan	2	Offaly	1994, 1998	
Jim Langton	2	Kilkenny	1939, 1947	
Dinny Lanigan	2	Limerick	1918, 1921	
Jimmy Lanigan	2	Tipperary	1930, 1937	
Philly Larkin	2	Kilkenny	2000, 2002	
Jim Lawlor	2	Kilkenny	1904, 1905	
Martin Lawlor	2	Kilkenny	1904, 1905	
John Leahy	2	Tipperary	1989, 1991	
Johnny Leahy	2	Tipperary	1916, 1925	
Paddy Leahy	2	Tipperary	1916, 1925	
Terry Leahy	2	Kilkenny	1939, 1947	
Brian Lohan	2	Clare	1995, 1997	
Frank Lohan	2	Clare	1995, 1997	
Brendan Lynskey	2	Galway	1987, 1988	
Paddy Maher	2	Tipperary	1900, 1906	
Steve Mahon	2	Galway	1980, 1987	
Mick Malone	2	Cork	1976, 1977	
Pat Malone	2	Galway	1987, 1988	
Kevin Martin	2	Offaly	1994, 1998	
Liam McCarthy	2	Kilkenny	1992, 1993	
Niall McCarthy	2	Cork	2004, 2005	
Teddy McCarthy	2	Cork	1986, 1990	Won a football medal in 1990, a unique double.
Tommy McCarthy	2	Limerick	1934, 1936	
Bob McConkey	2	Limerick	1918, 1921	
Tom McCormack	2	Kilkenny	1974, 1975	
Tom McCormack	2	Kilkenny	1911, 1912	
Pat McDonnell	2	Cork	1970, 1976	
Brian McEvoy	2	Kilkenny	2000, 2002	
Johnny McGovern	2	Kilkenny	1957, 1963	
Dave McGrath	2	Cork	1902, 1903	
Michael McGrath	2	Galway	1987, 1988	
Tom McGrath	2	Limerick	1918, 1921	
Gerry McInerney	2	Galway	1987, 1988	
Pa McInerney	2	Clare; Dublin	1914, 1927	
Paddy McInerney	2	Limerick	1918, 1921	
Paddy McMahon	2	Limerick	1936, 1940	
Seánie McMahon	2	Clare	1995, 1997	
Jack Mockler	2	Tipperary	1906, 1908	
P. J. Molloy	2	Galway	1980, 1987	
Tom Moloughney	2	Tipperary	1961, 1962	
Tommy Moore	2	Dublin	1917, 1920	
Eamon Morrissey	2	Kilkenny	1992, 1993	
Denis Mulcahy	2	Cork	1984, 1986	
Jack Mulcahy	2	Kilkenny	1939, 1947	
Brian Murphy	2	Cork	2004, 2005	
Kieran Murphy	2	Cork	2004, 2005	
Michael Murphy	2	Cork	1893, 1894	
Mick Murphy	2	Cork	1919, 1926	
Mick Murphy	2	Limerick	1918, 1921	
Tom Murphy	2	Kilkenny	1963, 1969	
Martin Naughton	2	Galway	1987, 1988	
Mick Neville	2	Dublin; Limerick	1917, 1920	
Tom Neville	2	Wexford	1960, 1968	
Pat Nolan	2	Wexford	1960, 1968	
Jer Norberg	2	Cork	1893, 1894	
Donal O'Brien	2	Tipperary	1961, 1962	
Jim O'Brien	2	Tipperary	1906, 1908	
Jimmy O'Brien	2	Wexford	1960, 1968	
Martin O'Brien	2	Tipperary	1906, 1908	
Donie O'Connell	2	Tipperary	1989, 1991	
P. J. O'Connell	2	Clare	1995, 1997	
Willie John O'Connell	2	Cork	1893, 1894	
Eddie O'Connor	2	Kilkenny	1992, 1993	
Jamesie O'Connor	2	Clare	1995, 1997	
Jerry O'Connor	2	Cork	2004, 2005	
Arthur O'Donnell	2	Tipperary	1916, 1925	
Éamonn O'Donoghue	2	Cork	1976, 1978	
John O'Donoghue	2	Tipperary	1964, 1965	
Willie O'Dwyer	2	Kilkenny; Kerry	2006, 2007	
Matt O'Gara	2	Tipperary	1961, 1962	
Michael O'Halloran	2	Clare	1995, 1997	
Denis O'Keeffe	2	Cork	1902, 1903	
Dick O'Keeffe	2	Tipperary	1898, 1899	
Jim O'Keeffe	2	Tipperary	1898, 1899	
Joe O'Keeffe	2	Tipperary	1900, 1906	
Jerh O'Leary	2	Cork	1902, 1903	
John O'Leary	2	Cork	1893, 1894	
Ger O'Loughlin	2	Clare	1995, 1997	
Dinny O'Neill	2	Dublin	1924, 1927	
Pat O'Neill	2	Kilkenny	1992, 1993	
Willie O'Neill	2	Cork	1902, 1903	
Mossy O'Riordan	2	Cork	1946, 1952	
Ted O'Sullivan	2	Cork	1941, 1943	
Tom O'Sullivan	2	Cork	1953, 1954	
Nicky Orr	2	Kilkenny	1974, 1975	
Danny Owens	2	Offaly	1981, 1985	
Michael Phelan	2	Kilkenny	1992, 1993	
Johnny Pilkington	2	Offaly	1994, 1998	
Jack Power	2	Tipperary	1916, 1925	
Jackie Power	2	Limerick	1936, 1940	
John Power	2	Kilkenny	2014, 2015	
Martin Power	2	Kilkenny	1932, 1933	
Richie Power	2	Kilkenny	1982, 1983	
Bobby Rackard	2	Wexford	1955, 1956	
Nicky Rackard	2	Wexford	1955, 1956	
Michel Rice	2	Kilkenny	2009, 2011	
Hubert Rigney	2	Offaly	1994, 1998	
Steva Riordan	2	Cork	1902, 1903	
Adrian Ronan	2	Kilkenny	1992, 1993	
Neil Ronan	2	Cork	1999, 2005	
James Ryall	2	Kilkenny	2003, 2006	
Aidan Ryan	2	Tipperary	1989, 1991	
Bobby Ryan	2	Tipperary	1989, 1991	
Éanna Ryan	2	Galway	1987, 1988	
Ed Ryan	2	Tipperary	1896, 1898	
John Ryan	2	Dublin	1917, 1920	
John Ryan	2	Tipperary	1898, 1899	
Mick Ryan	2	Limerick	1934, 1936	
Ned Ryan	2	Tipperary	1950, 1951	
Paddy Ryan	2	Tipperary	1937, 1945	
Tom Ryan	2	Tipperary	1961, 1962	
Tom Ryan	2	Wexford	1955, 1956	
Tommy Ryan	2	Tipperary	1949, 1950	
Willie Ryan	2	Limerick	1918, 1921	
Paddy Scanlon	2	Limerick	1936, 1940	
Denis Scannell	2	Cork	1892, 1893	
Noel Sheehy	2	Tipperary	1989, 1991	
Wayne Sherlock	2	Cork	1999, 2004	
Liam Simpson	2	Kilkenny	1992, 1993	
Tommy Treacy	2	Tipperary	1930, 1937	
Jim Troy	2	Offaly	1985, 1994	
John Troy	2	Offaly	1994, 1998	
Fergus Tuohy	2	Clare	1995, 1997	
Joe Twomey	2	Cork	1952, 1953	
Denis Walsh	2	Cork	1986, 1990	
Michael Walsh	2	Kilkenny	1992, 1993	
Pádraig Walsh	2	Kilkenny	2014, 2015	
Tom Walsh	2	Kilkenny	1963, 1967	
Brian Whelehan	2	Offaly	1994, 1998	
Jim Young	2	Cork	1893, 1894	
Liam Abernethy	1	Cork	1952	
Dominic Aherne	1	Wexford	1955	
John Allen	1	Cork	1978	
Willie Banim	1	Dublin	1924	
Jack Barrett	1	Cork	1941	
Ned Barrett	1	London	1901	
John Barron	1	Waterford	1959	
Jim Barry	1	London	1901	
Pat Barry	1	Cork	1976	
Paddy Barry	1	Limerick	1918	
Seánie Barry	1	Cork	1966	
Tom Barry	1	London	1901	
John Barry-Murphy	1	Cork	1919	
Vin Baston	1	Waterford	1948	
Derry Beckett	1	Cork	1942	
Tom Belton	1	Dublin	1889	
Jim Bennett	1	Kilkenny	1967	
John Bennett	1	Cork	1966	
Phil Bennis	1	Limerick	1973	
Richie Bennis	1	Limerick	1973	
Dave Bernie	1	Wexford	1968	
Jack Berry	1	Wexford	1968	
John Bishop	1	Dublin	1889	
Dick Blanchfield	1	Kilkenny	1967	
Ned Bowe	1	Tipperary	1887	
Bobby Brannigan	1	Kilkenny	1939	
Tom Brazil	1	Limerick	1897	
Canice Brennan	1	Kilkenny	2000	
Dick Brennan	1	Kilkenny	1904	
Martin Brennan	1	Kilkenny	1969	
Mick Brophy	1	Kilkenny	1957	
Mick Brophy	1	Dublin	1938	
Alan Browne	1	Cork	1999	
Richard Browne	1	Cork	1986	
Connie Buckley	1	Cork	1941	
John Buckley	1	Cork	1890	
Seán Buckley	1	Kilkenny	1969	
Paddy Buggy	1	Kilkenny	1957	
Brendan Bugler	1	Clare	2013	
Billy Burke	1	Kilkenny	1939	
Frank Burke	1	Galway	1980	
Gerry Burke	1	Galway	1988	
Hugh Burke	1	Dublin	1917	
Tom Burke	1	Tipperary	1887	
Mick Butler	1	Dublin	1938	
Patrick Butler	1	Limerick	1897	
Tom Butler	1	Dublin	1889	
Billy Byrne	1	Wexford	1996	
Denis Byrne	1	Kilkenny; Tipperary	2000	
Jim Byrne	1	Dublin	1938	
Locky Byrne	1	Kilkenny; Waterford	1935	
Ned Byrne	1	Kilkenny	1972	
Paul Byrne	1	Tipperary	1971	
Stephen Byrne	1	Offaly	1998	
J. Cahill	1	Dublin	1889	
Michael Cahill	1	Tipperary	2010	
Willie Cahill	1	Kilkenny	1947	
Séamus Callanan	3	Tipperary	2010, 2016, 2019	
Paddy Campion	1	Laois	1915	
Joe Canning	1	Galway	2017	
Anthony Carew	1	Tipperary	1908	
Eddie Carew	1	Waterford	1948	
Jim Carroll	1	Laois	1915	
Joe Carroll	1	Laois	1915	
John Carroll	1	Tipperary	2001	
John Carroll	1	Kilkenny	1932	
John Carroll	1	Laois	1915	
Mick Carroll	1	Tipperary	1887	
Pat Carroll	1	Offaly	1981	
Pat Carroll	1	Kilkenny	1967	
Tom Carroll	1	Tipperary	1887	
Tommy Carroll	1	Kilkenny	1922	
Cathal Casey	1	Cork	1990	
Michael Casserly	1	Cork	1892	
Tom Cheasty	1	Waterford	1959	
Jim Clancy	1	Clare	1914	
Willie Clancy	1	Cork	1931	
Ned Clarke	1	Limerick	1940	
Pat Cleary	1	Offaly	1985	
Donal Clifford	1	Cork	1970	
Johnny Clifford	1	Cork	1954	Won a medal as a non-playing substitute in 1953
Jim Close	1	Limerick	1934	
Jim Clune	1	Dublin	1920	
Martin Codd	1	Wexford	1956	
Paul Codd	1	Wexford	1996	
Séamus Coen	1	Galway	1980	
Jimmy Coffey	1	Tipperary	1937	
John Coffey	1	Tipperary	1945	
Michael Coleman	1	Galway	1988	
Ned Colfer	1	Wexford	1968	
Podge Collins	1	Clare	2013	
Jer Collison	1	Tipperary	1916	
Jackie Condon	1	Waterford	1959	
John Condon	1	Limerick	1897	
John Conlon	2	Clare	2013, 2024	
Michael Conneely	1	Galway	1980	
Tom Conneely	1	Offaly	1985	
Joe Connolly	1	Galway	1980	
John Connolly	1	Galway	1980	
Michael Connolly	1	Galway	1980	
Tony Connolly	1	Cork	1966	
John Considine	1	Cork	1990	
Willie Considine	1	Clare	1914	
James Conway	1	Cork	1892	
Tommy Cooke	1	Limerick	1940	
Jimmy Cooney	1	Galway	1980	
Jimmy Cooney	1	Tipperary	1937	
Éamonn Corcoran	1	Tipperary	2001	
Pat Corcoran	1	Wexford	1910	
Paddy Corrigan	1	Offaly	1985	
Thomas Costello	1	Tipperary	2001	
Jim Cottrill	1	Limerick	1897	
Dan Coughlan	1	Cork	1894	
Denis Coughlan	1	Cork	1892	
Frank Coughlan	1	Dublin	1889	
Jack Coughlan	1	London	1901	
Jerh Coughlan	1	Cork	1903	
Éamonn Cregan	1	Limerick	1973	
Ned Cregan	1	Limerick	1934	
Peter Cregan	1	Limerick	1940	
Mick Cronin	1	Tipperary	1930	
C. Crowley	1	London	1901	
Frank Crowley	1	Kerry	1891	
James Crowley	1	Kerry	1891	
Charlie Cullinane	1	Cork	1970	
Brendan Cummins	1	Cork	1976	
Mike Cummins	1	Wexford	1910	
Tom Cunningham	1	Waterford	1959	
Liam Currams	1	Offaly	1981	Won a football medal in 1982
Paul Curran	1	Tipperary	2010	
Tom Curran	1	Waterford	1948	
John Cusack	1	Waterford	1948	
Ger Cushe	1	Wexford	1996	
Ed Daly	1	Waterford	1948	
Jack Daly	1	Laois	1915	
Johnny Daly	1	Cork	1902	
William Daly	1	Cork	1902	
Mick Daniels	1	Dublin	1938	
Jack Darcy	1	Tipperary	1925	
Mick Darcy	1	Tipperary	1925	
P. J. Delaney	1	Kilkenny	1993	
Paul Delaney	1	Tipperary	1991	
Joe Delahunty	1	Kilkenny	1909	
Tom Dempsey	1	Wexford	1996	
Mick Derivan	1	Galway	1923	
William Devereux	1	Wexford	1910	
Jim Devitt	1	Tipperary	1945	
Cian Dillon	1	Clare	2013	
Tom Dixon	1	Wexford	1956	
Jack Doherty	1	Tipperary	1916	
Paddy Doherty	1	Tipperary	1896	
Jim Donegan	1	Kilkenny	1947	
Patrick Donnellan	1	Clare	2013	
Paddy Donoghue	1	Kilkenny	1922	
Tom Donoghue	1	Offaly	1981	
Sim Donohoe	1	Wexford	1910	
Pat Doody	1	Dublin	1938	
Tim Doody	1	London	1901	
Peter Doolan	1	Cork	1966	
Tony Doran	1	Wexford	1968	
Mossie Dowling	1	Limerick	1973	
Seán Dowling	1	Kilkenny	2003	
Michael Downes	1	Limerick	1897	
Shem Downey	1	Kilkenny	1947	
Dick Doyle	1	Wexford	1910	
Tom Duffy	1	Tipperary	1925	
Michael Duignan	1	Offaly	1998	
Benny Dunne	1	Tipperary	2010	
Dan Dunne	1	Kilkenny	1932	
Jack Dunne	1	Tipperary	1887	
Jim Dunne	1	Kilkenny	1904	
Liam Dunne	1	Wexford	1996	
Tom Dunne	1	Kerry	1891	
Tommy Dunne	1	Tipperary	2001	
Jack Dunphy	1	Laois	1915	
Jim Dunphy	1	Kilkenny	1909	
Ned Dunphy	1	Kilkenny	1922	
Wattie Dunphy	1	Kilkenny	1922	
Tom Dwan	1	Tipperary	1916	
Jer Dwyer	1	Tipperary	1887	
Tim Dwyer	1	Tipperary	1887	
Eddie Enright	1	Tipperary	2001	
Joe Errity	1	Offaly	1998	
Donnacha Fahy	1	Tipperary	2001	
Ned Fahy	1	Dublin	1927	
Declan Fanning	1	Tipperary	2010	
Phil Farrell	1	Dublin	1938	
Adrian Fenlon	1	Wexford	1996	
Kevin Fennelly	1	Kilkenny	1979	
Pat Fielding	1	Kilkenny	1904	
Jack Finlay	1	Laois; Dublin	1915	
John Finn	1	Limerick	1897	
Mick Finn	1	Limerick	1897	
Paul Finn	1	Wexford	1996	
J. Fitzgerald	1	London	1901	
John Fitzgerald	1	Tipperary	1908	
Paddy Fitzgerald	1	Cork	1966	
Pat Fitzgerald	1	Tipperary	1908	
John Fitzgibbon	1	Cork	1990	
William Fitzgibbon	1	Cork	1902	
Damien Fitzhenry	1	Wexford	1996	
Maurice Fitzmaurice	1	Kerry	1891	
Paudie Fitzmaurice	1	Limerick	1973	
Joe Fitzpatrick	1	Tipperary	1916	
John Fitzpatrick	1	Kilkenny	1933	
Jack Flanagan	1	Tipperary	1899	
John Flanagan	1	Tipperary	1971	
Johnny Flaherty	1	Offaly	1981	
Larry Flaherty	1	Cork	1903	
Pat Flaherty	1	Cork	1893	
Mick Flanagan	1	Clare	1914	
Mick Flannelly	1	Waterford	1959	
Andy Fleming	1	Waterford	1948	
Tom Fleming	1	Galway	1923	
Jim Flood	1	Limerick	1897	
Austin Flynn	1	Waterford	1959	
Maurice Flynn	1	Limerick	1897	
Mick Flynn	1	Dublin	1938	
Patrick Flynn	1	Limerick	1897	
Declan Fogarty	1	Offaly	1985	
Mark Foley	1	Cork	1990	
Seán Foley	1	Limerick	1973	
Bernie Forde	1	Galway	1980	
Christy Forde	1	Dublin	1938	
David Forde	1	Clare	1997	
Dick Fortune	1	Wexford	1910	
Jas Fortune	1	Wexford	1910	
John Fox	1	Clare	1914	
Colm Galvin	1	Clare	2013	
Willie Galvin	1	Waterford	1948	
Finbarr Gantley	1	Galway	1980	
Jack Gargan	1	Kilkenny; Dublin	1947	
Jimmy Garvey	1	Galway	1923	
Bernie Gibbs	1	Galway	1923	
Mick Gill	1	Dublin	1938	
Ned Gilligan	1	Dublin	1889	
Niall Gilligan	1	Clare	1997	
Ed Gilmartin	1	Galway	1923	
Jim Gilmartin	1	Dublin	1938	
Conor Gleeson	1	Tipperary	2001	
Eddie Gleeson	1	Tipperary	1945	
Jack Gleeson	1	Tipperary	1937	
Jack Gleeson	1	Dublin	1927	
Jim Gleeson	1	Tipperary	1895	
John Gleeson	1	Tipperary	1971	
Pat Glendon	1	Kilkenny	1922	
Harry Goldsboro	1	Tipperary	1945	
Jackie Good	1	Waterford	1948	
Tom Goode	1	Cork	1890	
Éamonn Goulding	1	Cork	1954	
Dan Grace	1	Kilkenny	1904	
Ned Grace	1	Clare	1914	
Harry Gray	1	Laois; Dublin	1938	
Ned Grey	1	Cork	1919	
Willie Griffin	1	Cork	1952	
Denis Grimes	1	Limerick	1897	
Éamonn Grimes	1	Limerick	1973	
Phil Grimes	1	Waterford	1959	Won a medal as a non-playing substitute in 1948
Jim Guerin	1	Clare	1914	
Larry Guinan	1	Waterford	1959	
Rod Guiney	1	Wexford	1996	
Charles Hackett	1	Dublin	1889	
Martin Hackett	1	Dublin	1917	
Stephen Hackett	1	Tipperary	1925	
Denis Halloran	1	Cork	1892	
James Hanley	1	Limerick	1897	
Darren Hanniffy	1	Offaly	1998	
Gary Hanniffy	1	Offaly	1998	
Jack Harding	1	Wexford	1960	
Ignatius Harney	1	Galway	1923	
Jimmy Harney	1	Tipperary	1930	
Joe Harney	1	Waterford	1959	
James Harper	1	Dublin	1889	
Bernie Hartigan	1	Limerick	1973	
Pat Hartigan	1	Limerick	1973	
Jim Hassett	1	Cork	1919	
Matt Hassett	1	Tipperary	1961	
Paddy Hayden	1	Kilkenny	1947	
Jer Hayes	1	Tipperary	1906	
Joe Hayes	1	Tipperary	1989	
John Joe Hayes	1	Tipperary	1925	
Mick Hayes	1	Waterford	1948	
Ned Hayes	1	Tipperary	1900	
Paddy Hayes	1	Tipperary	1900	
Stephen Hayes	1	Cork	1894	
Tom Hayes	1	Dublin	1920	
Tom Healy	1	Tipperary	1887	
James Heaney	1	Tipperary	1930	
Jimmy Heffernan	1	Kilkenny	1947	
John Heffernan	1	Tipperary	1989	
Pat Hegarty	1	Cork	1970	
Jer Henchion	1	Cork	1890	
Bill Hennebry	1	Kilkenny	1909	
Bill Hennessy	1	Cork	1903	
Séamus Hennessy	1	Tipperary	2010	
Tom Herbert	1	Limerick	1940	
Mick Hickey	1	Limerick	1940	
Mick Hickey	1	Waterford	1948	
Bill Higgins	1	Cork	1926	
Jack Hiney	1	Laois	1915	
Bobby Hinks	1	Kilkenny	1939	
John Hodgins	1	Cork	1984	
Séamus Hogan	1	Tipperary	1971	
Mick Holland	1	Dublin	1924	
John Holohan	1	Kilkenny	1922	
Darach Honan	1	Clare	2013	
Dan Horgan	1	London	1901	
Denis Horgan	1	Cork	1890	
M. Horgan	1	London	1901	
Michael Horgan	1	Cork	1890	
Séamus Horgan	1	Limerick	1973	
Seán Hyde	1	Cork; Dublin	1917	
John Hynes	1	Limerick	1897	
Tom Irwin	1	Cork	1892	
Christy Jacob	1	Wexford	1968	
Dave Kavanagh	1	Wexford	1910	
Ned Kavanagh	1	Kilkenny	1947	
Pat Kavanagh	1	Kilkenny	1969	
Larry Keane	1	Tipperary	1958	
D. J. Kearney	1	Cork	1926	
James Keegan	1	Cork	1892	
Andy Kehoe	1	Wexford	1910	
Colm Kehoe	1	Wexford	1996	
Paddy Kehoe	1	Wexford	1955	
Frank Kelleher	1	Cork	1919	
Jim Kelleher	1	Cork	1894	
John Kelleher	1	Cork	1890	
Tim Kelleher	1	Cork	1890	
Jer Kelliher	1	London	1901	
Andy Kelly	1	Galway	1923	
Brendan Kelly	1	Offaly	1994	
Eddie Kelly	1	Wexford	1968	
John Kelly	1	Tipperary	1971	
Maurice Kelly	1	Kerry	1891	
Mickey Kelly	1	Kilkenny	1957	
Patrick Kelly	1	Clare	2013	
Paul Kelly	1	Tipperary	2001	
Tommy Kelly	1	Dublin	1924	
Tony Kelly	2	Clare	2013, 2024	
John Kenneally	1	Cork	1892	
Johnny Kenneally	1	Cork	1929	
Dan Kennedy	1	Kilkenny	1947	
David Kennedy	1	Tipperary	2001	
Eamonn Kennedy	1	Kilkenny	2000	
Jimmy Kennedy	1	Cork	1919	Won a medal as a non-playing substitute in 1926
John Kennedy	1	Tipperary	1989	
John Kennedy	1	Wexford	1960	
Bill Kenny	1	Kilkenny	1922	
Mick Kenny	1	Galway	1923	
Mick Kenny	1	Kilkenny	1957	
Paddy Kennedy	1	Limerick	1918	
Paddy Kennefick	1	Dublin	1917	
Stephen Kenny	1	Tipperary	1925	
Tom Kennedy	1	Tipperary	1937	
Liam Keoghan	1	Kilkenny	1993	
Bill Kerwick	1	Tipperary	1895	
Dan Kerwick	1	Dublin	1889	
Dinny Kidney	1	Cork	1903	
John Kidney	1	Cork	1894	
John Kiely	1	Waterford	1959	Won a medal as a non-playing substitute in 1948
John King	1	London	1901	
Martin King	1	Galway	1923	
Paddy King	1	London	1901	
Kieran Kingston	1	Cork	1986	
John Kinsella	1	Kilkenny	1972	
Liam King	1	Tipperary	1971	
Michael Kirby	1	Kerry	1891	
Paddy Kirwan	1	Offaly	1981	
Richard Kissane	1	Kerry	1891	
Mick Lacey	1	Waterford	1959	
Gary Laffan	1	Wexford	1996	
John Lambe	1	Dublin	1889	
Ned Lambe	1	Tipperary	1887	
Mark Landers	1	Cork	1999	
Dan Lane	1	Cork	1890	
Tom Larkin	1	Tipperary	1958	
Mick Lawler	1	Kilkenny	1969	
Martin Lawlor	1	Kilkenny	1922	
John Leahy	1	Cork	1892	
Pat Leahy	1	Cork	1902	
Pat Leahy	1	Tipperary	1887	
Tommy Leahy	1	Tipperary	1930	
John Leamy	1	Tipperary	1887	
Jack Lennon	1	Kilkenny	1913	
Dan Linehan	1	Cork	1890	
John Linehan	1	Cork	1890	
Mick Lonergan	1	Tipperary	1964	
Dan Looney	1	Cork	1890	
Séamus Looney	1	Cork	1970	
Bill Loughnane	1	Dublin	1938	
Francis Loughnane	1	Tipperary	1971	
Con Lucey	1	Cork	1919	
Jimmy Lynam	1	Cork	1952	
Colin Lynch	1	Clare	1997	
Jim Lynch	1	Kilkenny	1967	
Jim Lynch	1	London	1901	
Paul Lynch	1	Wexford	1968	
Tim Lynch	1	Cork	1902	
Cyril Lyons	1	Clare	1995	
Billy Mackessy	1	Cork	1903	Won a football medal in 1911
Dan Mackey	1	Tipperary	1937	
Paddy Mackey	1	Wexford	1910	Won football medals in 1915, 1916, 1917 and 1918
Mick Madigan	1	Dublin	1889	
Andy Maher	1	Tipperary	1887	
Billy Maher	1	Tipperary	1900	
Brendan Maher	1	Tipperary	2010	
Jimmy Maher	1	Tipperary	1945	
John Maher	1	Tipperary	1895	
John Maher	1	Kilkenny	1957	
Matty Maher	1	Tipperary	1887	
Ned Maher	1	Tipperary	1898	
Pádraic Maher	1	Tipperary	2010	
Pat Maher	1	Kilkenny	1904	
Patrick Maher	1	Tipperary	2010	
Peter Maher	1	Tipperary	1895	
Philip Maher	1	Tipperary	2001	
Tom Maher	1	Dublin	1889	
Tom Maher	1	Tipperary	1887	
Tony Maher	1	Cork	1970	
John Mahony	1	Kerry	1891	
Junior Mahony	1	Galway	1923	
Tom Mahony	1	Cork	1902	
Tom Mangan	1	Limerick	1921	
Mark Marnell	1	Kilkenny	1947	
Damien Martin	1	Offaly	1981	
Donal McCarthy	1	Cork	1929	
Jim McCarthy	1	Limerick	1940	
Justin McCarthy	1	Cork	1966	
Michael McCarthy	1	Kerry	1891	
Rory McCarthy	1	Wexford	1996	
Seán McCarthy	1	Cork	1990	
Thade Donal McCarthy	1	Kerry	1891	
Thade Eugene McCarthy	1	Kerry	1891	
Fergal McCormack	1	Cork	1999	
Mark McDonald	1	Kilkenny	1922	
Jim McDonnell	1	Kerry	1891	
Mossy McDonnell	1	Dublin	1938	
Ned McEvoy	1	Laois	1915	
Conor McGrath	1	Clare	2013	
Leonard McGrath	1	Galway	1923	
Noel McGrath	4	Tipperary	2010, 2016, 2019, 2025	
Oliver McGrath	1	Wexford	1960	
Seánie McGrath	1	Cork	1999	
Shane McGrath	1	Tipperary	2010	
Tom McGrath	1	Clare	1914	
Kieran McGuckin	1	Cork	1990	
Shane McGuckin	1	Offaly	1994	
Bill McHugh	1	Wexford	1910	
Cathal McInerney	1	Clare	2013	
David McInerney	1	Clare	2013	
Niall McInerney	1	Galway	1980	
Joe McKenna	1	Limerick	1973	
Paul McKenna	1	Tipperary	1930	
Thomas McKenna	1	Dublin	1889	
Charlie McMahon	1	Dublin	1938	
M. McMahon	1	London	1901	
Martin McNamara	1	Tipperary	1887	
Stephen McNamara	1	Clare	1995	
Joe Millea	1	Kilkenny	1969	
John Mitchell	1	Wexford	1960	
John Mockler	1	Tipperary	1887	
Martin Mockler	1	Tipperary	1925	
Martin Moloney	1	Clare	1914	
Billy Moloughney	1	Tipperary	1961	
Joe Moloughney	1	Tipperary	1908	
Willie Moore	1	Limerick	1973	
Willie Moore	1	Cork	1954	
Séadna Morey	1	Clare	2013	
Fergus Moriarty	1	Tipperary	1895	
Jimmy Morris	1	Galway	1923	
Dick Morrissey	1	Galway	1923	
Éamonn Morrissey	1	Kilkenny	1972	
Martin Óg Morrissey	1	Waterford	1959	
Jim Morrisson	1	Cork	1944	
Christy Moylan	1	Waterford	1948	
Pat Mulcahy	1	Limerick	1897	
Pat Mulcahy	1	Cork	2005	
Paudie Mulhaire	1	Offaly	1998	
John Mulhall	1	Kilkenny	2011	
Paddy Mullally	1	Kilkenny	2003	
Mick Mullane	1	Limerick	1921	
Dave Murnane	1	Limerick	1921	
Barry Murphy	1	Clare	1997	
Bernie Murphy	1	Cork	1943	
Con Murphy	1	Cork	1946	
Denis Murphy	1	Cork	1966	
Denis Murphy	1	Tipperary	1937	
Jimmy Murphy	1	Tipperary	1916	
John Murphy	1	Cork	1893	
John Murphy	1	Kerry	1891	
Kieran Murphy	1	Cork	2005	
Larry Murphy	1	Wexford	1996	
Mattie Murphy	1	Cork	1926	
Maurice Murphy	1	Cork	1926	
Mick Murphy	1	Tipperary	1964	
Mick Murphy	1	Tipperary	1945	
Mossy Murphy	1	Kilkenny	1972	
Ned Murphy	1	Tipperary	1887	
Simon Murphy	1	Cork	1970	
Tadhg Murphy	1	Cork	1977	
Tom Murphy	1	Kilkenny	1993	
Willie Murphy	1	Kilkenny	1969	
Willie Murphy	1	Wexford	1968	
Kevin Murray	1	Cork	1999	
Jas Mythen	1	Wexford	1910	
Tim Nagle	1	Cork	1919	
Alan Neville	1	Clare	1995	
Mick Neville	1	Wexford	1910	
Frankie Nolan	1	Limerick	1973	
John Nolan	1	Wexford	1960	
Conor O'Brien	1	Tipperary	2010	
Eddie O'Brien	1	Cork	1970	
J. O'Brien	1	London	1901	
Jim O'Brien	1	Limerick	1973	
John O'Brien	1	Tipperary	2010	
John O'Brien	1	London	1901	
Paddy O'Brien	1	Tipperary	2001	
Patrick O'Brien	1	Limerick	1897	
Seánie O'Brien	1	Kilkenny	1939	
J. D. O'Byrne	1	Dublin	1889	
Bill O'Callaghan	1	Cork	1892	
Con O'Callaghan	1	Cork	1892	
Paddy O'Carroll	1	Kerry	1891	
Paddy O'Carroll	1	Limerick	1936	
Jackie O'Connell	1	Limerick	1934	
Jer O'Connell	1	London	1901	
Mickey O'Connell	1	Cork	1999	
Nicky O'Connell	1	Clare	2013	
George O'Connor	1	Wexford	1996	
John O'Connor	1	Wexford	1996	
Johnny O'Connor	1	Waterford	1948	
Kevin O'Connor	1	Waterford	1948	
Michael O'Connor	1	Waterford	1959	
Pat O'Connor	1	Offaly	1994	
Patrick O'Connor	1	Clare	2013	
Tadhg O'Connor	1	Tipperary	1971	
Thady O'Connor	1	Cork	1890	
William O'Connor	1	Cork	1892	
Bill O'Donnell	1	Tipperary	1937	
Shane O'Donnell	2	Clare	2013, 2024	
Liam O'Donoghue	1	Limerick	1973	
Tom O'Donoghue	1	Cork	1966	
Conor O'Donovan	1	Tipperary	1989	
Domhnall O'Donovan	1	Clare	2013	
Seán O'Donovan	1	Dublin	1917	
Billy O'Dwyer	1	Tipperary	1916	
Michael O'Dwyer	1	Tipperary	1908	
Noel O'Dwyer	1	Tipperary	1971	
Paddy O'Dwyer	1	Tipperary	1925	
Willie O'Dwyer	1	Tipperary	1916	
Denis O'Gorman	1	Tipperary	1937	
Dick O'Gorman	1	Cork	1919	
Larry O'Gorman	1	Wexford	1996	
Seán O'Gorman	1	Cork	1990	
Donal O'Grady	1	Cork	1984	
John O'Grady	1	Tipperary	1958	
John O'Halloran	1	Cork	1966	
Paddy O'Halloran	1	Cork	1919	
Mick O'Hanlon	1	Wexford	1955	
Bob O'Keeffe	1	Laois	1915	
John O'Keeffe	1	Cork	1919	
Paddy O'Keeffe	1	Cork	1893	
Seán O'Kennedy	1	Wexford	1910	Won football medals in 1915, 1916 and 1917
Mark O'Leary	1	Tipperary	2001	
Michael O'Leary	1	Cork	1903	
Jimmy O'Loughlin	1	Tipperary	1930	
Conor O'Mahony	1	Tipperary	2010	
Eugene O'Neill	1	Tipperary	2001	
Michael Riordan	1	Kerry	1891	
Pad O'Riordan	1	Cork	1890	
Pat O'Riordan	1	Cork	1890	
Pat O'Riordan	1	Dublin	1889	
S. O'Riordan	1	Dublin	1889	
Pat O'Rourke	1	Kerry	1891	
Tom O'Rourke	1	Galway; Dublin	1927	
Jackie O'Shea	1	Cork	1902	
Maurice O'Shea	1	Cork	1902	
Nicholas O'Shea	1	Dublin	1889	
Pat O'Shea	1	Dublin	1889	
Brendan O'Sullivan	1	Cork	1990	
Jack O'Sullivan	1	Kerry	1891	
Jerry O'Sullivan	1	Cork	1966	
Michael O'Sullivan	1	Kerry	1891	
Pat O'Sullivan	1	Cork	1903	
Peter O'Sullivan	1	Tipperary	1971	
Paul Ormonde	1	Tipperary	2001	
F. Palmer	1	Dublin	1889	
Walter Parfrey	1	Cork	1902	
Michael Parker	1	Wexford	1910	
Bill Phelan	1	Dublin	1927	
Conor Phelan	1	Kilkenny	2003	
Jimmy Phelan	1	Kilkenny; Carlow	1939	
Joe Phelan	1	Laois	1915	
Declan Pilkington	1	Offaly	1994	
Ned Porter	1	Cork	1942	
Amby Power	1	Clare	1914	
Joe Power	1	Clare	1914	
Jim Power	1	Galway	1923	
Ned Power	1	Waterford	1959	
Paddy Power	1	Tipperary	1925	
Séamus Power	1	Waterford	1959	
Seán Power	1	Wexford	1960	
Paddy Prendergast	1	Kilkenny	1947	
Shane Prendergast	1	Kilkenny	2015	
Matt Parcell	1	Tipperary	1900	
Phil Purcell	1	Tipperary	1930	
Tommy Purcell	1	Tipperary	1945	
Jackeen Quane	1	Kerry	1891	
Pat Quane	1	Kerry	1891	
Seamus Quaid	1	Wexford	1960	
Dan Quigley	1	Wexford	1968	
John Quigley	1	Wexford	1968	
David Quirke	1	Cork	1990	
Ned Rea	1	Limerick	1973	
Daithí Regan	1	Offaly	1994	
Richie Reid	1	Kilkenny	1979	
John Reidy	1	Limerick	1897	
Liam Reidy	1	Kilkenny	1947	
E. Reilly	1	Cork	1890	
J. Reilly	1	Cork	1890	
Dannix Ring	1	Cork	1919	
Dan Riordan	1	Limerick	1897	
P. J. Riordan	1	Tipperary	1906	
Paddy Riordan	1	Tipperary	1895	
John Roberts	1	Kilkenny	1922	
Con Roche	1	Cork	1970	
Mick Rochford	1	Limerick	1918	
Pat Roche	1	Wexford	1910	
Dick Rockett	1	Kilkenny	1957	
Jim Ronayne	1	Cork	1902	
Patrick Ruskin	1	Limerick	1897	
Matt Ruth	1	Kilkenny	1979	
Bill Ryan	1	Tipperary	1925	
Chris Ryan	1	Limerick	1921	
Colin Ryan	1	Clare	2013	
Conor Ryan	1	Clare	2013	
Danny Ryan	1	Tipperary	1887	
Dick Ryan	1	Limerick	1918	
Dinny Ryan	1	Tipperary	1971	
Fergal Ryan	1	Cork	1999	
Gearóid Ryan	1	Tipperary	2010	
Harry Ryan	1	Kilkenny	1983	
Jack Ryan	1	Tipperary	1949	
Jer Ryan	1	Tipperary	1887	
Joe Ryan	1	Kilkenny	1909	
John Ryan	1	Offaly	1998	
John Ryan	1	Galway	1980	
Johnny Ryan	1	Tipperary	1937	
Matty Ryan	1	Tipperary	1900	
Matty Ryan	1	Tipperary	1945	
Michael Ryan	1	Tipperary	1991	
Micheál Ryan	1	Tipperary	2001	
Mick Ryan	1	Tipperary	1930	
P. J. Ryan	1	Tipperary	1971	
Paddy Ryan	1	Laois	1915	
Pat Ryan	1	Dublin	1889	
Robbie Ryan	1	Dublin	1938	
Roger Ryan	1	Tipperary	1971	
Tim Ryan	1	Tipperary	1951	
Tom Ryan	1	Limerick	1973	
Tom Ryan	1	Tipperary	1962	
Tomás Ryan	1	Cork	1970	
James Ryng	1	Cork	1941	
Paddy Saunders	1	Kilkenny	1904	
Éamonn Scallan	1	Wexford	1996	
Phil Scanlan	1	Tipperary	1896	
Jack Shaloo	1	Clare	1914	
Tommy Shanahan	1	Tipperary	1916	
Colm Sheehan	1	Cork	1966	
Connie Sheehan	1	Cork	1919	
Mikey Sheehan	1	Cork	1892	
Tom Shinny	1	Limerick	1934	
Mick Shortall	1	Kilkenny	1909	
Jim Shortle	1	Wexford	1910	
Seán Silke	1	Galway	1980	
Willie Small	1	Dublin	1924	
W. J. Spain	1	Dublin	1889	Won a football medal in 1887
Jim Spellissey	1	Clare	1914	
Conor Stakelum	1	Tipperary	1991	
Vinny Staples	1	Wexford	1968	
Jim Stapleton	1	Tipperary	1887	
Paddy Stapleton	1	Tipperary	2010	
Tom Stapleton	1	Tipperary	1887	
Dick Stokes	1	Limerick	1940	
Martin Storey	1	Wexford	1996	
Charlie Stuart	1	Dublin	1917	
Dan Sullivan	1	Cork	1890	
Ger Sullivan	1	Cork	1890	
John Sutton	1	Kilkenny	1957	
Éamonn Taaffe	1	Clare	1995	
John Teehan	1	Kilkenny	1967	
Ned Teehan	1	Kilkenny	1905	
Tom Teehan	1	Dublin	1938	
Charlie Tobin	1	Cork	1942	
Dick Tobin	1	Kilkenny	1922	
Jimmy Tobin	1	Kilkenny	1922	
Tom Toomey	1	Cork	1890	
Martin Treacy	1	Kilkenny	1963	
Dan Troy	1	Limerick	1918	
Tom Wall	1	Tipperary	1945	
Willie Wall	1	Tipperary	1937	
Bill Walsh	1	Kilkenny	1957	
Dick Walsh	1	Tipperary	1916	
Frankie Walsh	1	Waterford	1959	
Jim Walsh	1	Kilkenny	1957	
Liam Walsh	1	Kilkenny	1992	
Mick Walsh	1	Kilkenny	1957	
Tom Walsh	1	Kilkenny	1957	
Willie Walsh	1	Cork	1970	
John Walsh	1	Laois; Dublin	1915	
Tom Walton	1	Kilkenny	1947	
Jim Ware	1	Waterford	1948	
Mick Waters	1	Cork	1966	
Cha Whelan	1	Kilkenny	1963	
Donal Whelan	1	Waterford	1959	
Séamus Whelan	1	Wexford	1968	
Simon Whelehan	1	Offaly	1998	
Phil Wilson	1	Wexford	1968	
Pat Wynne	1	Kerry	1891	
David Young	1	Tipperary	2010	
Sean O' (John) Farrell	1	Kilkenny	1933	Won a medal as a non-playing substitute

== See also ==
- List of All-Ireland Senior Football Championship winning players
