= Mockler =

Mockler is an Irish surname of Norman origin. It derives from the Old French name Mauclerc. It is strongly associated with County Tipperary.

Notable people with the surname include:

- Adam Mockler (born 2002), American political commentator
- Bob Mockler (1886–1966), Irish sportsperson
- Colman M. Mockler Jr. (1929–1991), American business executive
- E. Jayne Mockler (born 1957), American politician from Wyoming
- Eric Mockler-Ferryman (1896–1978), British army official
- Frank Mockler (1909–1993), American politician from American Samoa and Wyoming
- Geraldine Mockler (1868–1967), English children's book author
- Jack Mockler (1893–1957), Irish hurler
- James Mockler (died 1789), Archdeacon of Cloyne
- James D. Mockler (1939–2014), American politician from Wyoming
- John Mockler (politician) (1941–2015), American state official in California
- John Mockler (hurler) (1866–?), Irish hurler
- Martin Mockler (1893–?), Irish hurler
- Percy Mockler (born 1949), Canadian politician from New Brunswick
