= Rochford (surname) =

Rochford or Rotchford is a surname. Notable people with the surname include:

- Andrew Rochford (born 1979), Australian television presenter
- Bernard Rochford (born 1979), Irish hurler
- Bill Rochford (1913–1984), British footballer
- Darlene Rotchford, Canadian politician
- Jack Rochford (1882–1953), Irish hurler
- Jane Boleyn, Viscountess Rochford
- John Rochford (died 1410), English politician
- Leonard Henry Rochford (1893–1986), British World War I flying ace
- Mick Rochford (1890–?), Irish hurler
- Mike Rochford (born 1963), American baseball player
- Peter Rochford (1928–1992), English cricketer
- Seb Rochford, British drummer
- Stephen Rochford (born 1978), Irish Gaelic football player and manager
