= Michael Hickey =

Michael Hickey may refer to:

- Michael Hickey (screenwriter)
- Michael Hickey (tennis)

== See also ==
- Mick Hickey (disambiguation)
- Mike Hickey, baseball player
