= Eddie Kelly =

Eddie Kelly may refer to:

- Eddie Kelly (footballer) (Edward Patrick Kelly, born 1951), Scottish former footballer
- Eddie Kelly (hurler) (Éamonn Ó Ceallaigh, born 1939), Irish retired hurler
- Eddie Kelly (boxer) (1885–1944), American featherweight boxer

== See also ==
- Edward Kelly (disambiguation)
