= Andy Kelly (hurler) =

Irish hurler

Andrew Kelly
Personal information
- Native name: Aindriú Ó Ceallaigh (Irish)
- Born: 1898 Tynagh, County Galway, Ireland

Sport
- Sport: Hurling
- Position: Full-forward
Club
- Years: Club
- Tynagh
Club titles
- Galway titles: 5
Inter-county
- Years: County
- 1923-1925: Galway
Inter-county titles
- All-Irelands: 1

Andrew Kelly (born 20 October 1898) was an Irish hurler who played as a full-forward for the Galway senior team.

Kelly made his first appearance for the team in the early 1920s and was a regular member of the starting fifteen for the next few seasons. During that time he won one All-Ireland medal as Galway claimed their very first championship in 1923. Kelly was an All-Ireland runner-up on two occasions.

At club level Kelly won numerous county club championship medals with Tynagh.

== Playing career ==
=== Club ===
Kelly played his club hurling with Tynagh and enjoyed much success during a lengthy career.

After losing back-to-back championship deciders in 1918 and 1919, Tynagh qualified for a third successive county final in 1920. A defeat of Kilconieron gave Kelly his first championship medal.

After the suspension of the championship the following year, Tynagh reached the county decider once again in 1922. Galway City were defeated on that occasion with Kelly winning a second championship medal. Tynagh made it two-in-a-row in 1923 with Kelly adding a third medal to his collection following a defeat of Ardrahan.

Once again the championship was suspended in 1924, however, Tynagh continued their dominance on its resumption by reaching the county final again in 1925. Craughwell were defeated on this occasion as Kelly won his fourth championship medal.

After two years of no championship activity, Tynagh defeated Peterswell in the championship decider of 1928. It was Kelly's fifth and final championship medal.

=== Inter-county ===
Kelly first came to prominence on the inter-county scene as a member of the Galway senior team as captain in 1923 as the team qualified for their first All-Ireland final in thirty-six years. After beating reigning champions Kilkenny at the penultimate stage, Galway now faced Limerick who were bidding for a third All-Ireland title in seven years. A high-scoring game developed, however, at half-time the sides were level. A hat-trick of goals by Leonard McGrath and powerful displays by Mick Gill and Mick Derivan helped Galway to a 7-3 to 4-5 victory. It was a first All-Ireland medal for Kelly.

Kelly lined out in a second successive All-Ireland decider in 1924 with Dublin providing the opposition. Galway played with the wind in the first-half and led by three points at the break. Two goals by Dublin forward Garrett Howard and a great goalkeeping display by Tommy Daly ensured a 5-3 to 2-6 defeat for Galway.

In 1925 Kelly was captain of Galway as the team reached a third successive All-Ireland decider. Tipperary were the opponents and started with a quick goal and never looked back. They went on to win the game by 5-6 to 1-5.

Sporting positions
Preceded by Mick Kenny	Galway Senior Hurling Captain; 1925	Succeeded by Jim Power
