= Bernie Gibbs =

Irish hurler

Bernard Gibbs
Personal information
- Native name: Beircheart Mac Gib (Irish)
- Nickname: Bernie
- Born: 1 April 1899 Gort, County Galway, Ireland
- Died: 14 March 1963 (aged 63) New York City, United States

Sport
- Sport: Hurling
- Position: Left corner-forward
Club
- Years: Club
- Gort
Club titles
- Galway titles: 0
Inter-county
- Years: County
- 1923–1925: Galway
Inter-county titles
- All-Irelands: 1

Bernard Gibbs (1899–1963) was an Irish hurler who played as a left corner-forward for the Galway senior team.

Gibbs made his first appearance for the team during the 1923 championship and was a regular member of the team until his emigration prior to the start of the 1925 championship. During that time he won one All-Ireland medal. Gibbs was an All-Ireland runner-up on one occasion.

Gibbs also enjoyed a brief club career with Gort.

== Playing career ==
=== Club ===
Gibbs played his club hurling with Gort, however, he enjoyed little success during his brief career.

=== Inter-county ===
Gibbs first came to prominence on the inter-county scene with Galway during their first breakthrough in the 1920s. In 1923 he was a key member of the team as Galway qualified for their first All-Ireland final in thirty-six years. After beating reigning champions Kilkenny at the penultimate stage, Galway now faced Limerick who were bidding for a third All-Ireland title in seven years. A high-scoring game developed, however, at half-time the sides were level. A hat-trick of goals by Leonard McGrath and powerful displays by Mick Gill and Mick Derivan helped Galway to a 7–3 to 4–5 victory. It was a first All-Ireland medal for Gibbs.

Gibbs played in a second successive All-Ireland decider in 1924 with Dublin providing the opposition. Galway played with the wind in the first-half and led by three points at the break. Two goals by Dublin forward Garrett Howard and a great goalkeeping display by Tommy Daly ensured a 5–3 to 2–6 defeat for Galway.

=== International ===
In 1924 Gibbs was honoured when he was chosen on the Ireland hurling team for the Tailteann Games competition.
