= Johnny Connolly (hurler) =

Irish hurler

Personal information
- Native name: Seán Ó Conghaile (Irish)
- Born: 8 October 1869 Tubberadora, County Tipperary, Ireland
- Died: 13 May 1957 (aged 87) Tubberadora, County Tipperary, Ireland
- Occupation: Farmer

Sport
- Sport: Hurling
Club
- Years: Club
- Tubberadora
Inter-county
- Years: County
- 1895-1898: Tipperary
Inter-county titles
- Munster titles: 3
- All-Irelands: 3

John Connolly (8 October 1869 – 13 May 1957) was an Irish sportsperson. He played hurling with his local club Tubberadora and was a member of the Tipperary senior hurling team between 1895 and 1898.

== Honours ==
Tipperary

- All-Ireland Senior Hurling Championship (3): 1895, 1896, 1898
- Munster Senior Hurling Championship (3): 1895, 1896, 1898
