= Junior Mahony =

Irish hurler

John Mahony
Personal information
- Native name: Seán Ó Mathúna (Irish)
- Nickname: Junior
- Born: John Mahony; 20 August 1897 Ardrahan, County Galway, Ireland
- Died: 8 May 1973 (aged 75) Galway, Ireland
- Occupation: Farmer

Sport
- Sport: Hurling
- Position: Goalkeeper
Club
- Years: Club
- Ardrahan
Club titles
- Galway titles: 0
Inter-county
- Years: County
- 1919-1929: Galway
Inter-county titles
- Connacht titles: 1
- All-Irelands: 1
- NHL: 0

John "Junior" Mahony (20 August 1897 – 8 May 1973) was an Irish hurler. Usually lining out as a goalkeeper, he was a member of the Galway team that won the 1923 All-Ireland Championship.

== Playing career ==
Mahony enjoyed a club career with Ardrahan that spanned three decades, however, he enjoyed little in terms of championship success. He is regarded as one of the club's greatest-ever players and was included on a special Team of the Millennium. After being selected for the Galway senior team in 1919, he held his position on the team for the next decade. He won a Connacht medal in 1922 before winning his sole All-Ireland medal in 1923 after Galway's defeat of Limerick in the final. Mahony was a runner-up in four subsequent All-Ireland finals and retired from inter-county hurling in 1929. As one of the top goalkeepers of his era, Mahony was included on the Ireland team at the Tailteann Games in 1924, for which he was awarded a gold medal.

== Personal life ==
Mahony was also a member of the Old IRA and was interned at Ballykinlar and other camps during the War of Independence. He died after a short illness on 8 May 1973.

== Honours ==
Galway

- All-Ireland Senior Hurling Championship (1): 1923
- Connacht Senior Hurling Championship (1): 1922
