= Dick O'Keeffe =

Irish hurler

Personal information
- Native name: Risteard Ó Caoimh (Irish)
- Born: 18 December 1879 Moycarkey, County Tipperary, Ireland
- Died: 2 April 1941 (aged 61) Horse and Jockey, County Tipperary, Ireland
- Occupation: Shopkeeper

Sport
- Sport: Hurling
Club
- Years: Club
- Horse and Jockey
Inter-county
- Years: County
- 1898-1899: Tipperary
Inter-county titles
- Munster titles: 2
- All-Irelands: 2

Richard O'Keeffe (7 December 1870 – 2 April 1941) was an Irish sportsperson. He played hurling with his local club Tubberadora and was a member of the Tipperary senior hurling team between 1898 and 1905.

== Honours ==
Tipperary

- All-Ireland Senior Hurling Championship (2): 1898, 1899
- Munster Senior Hurling Championship (2): 1898, 1899
