= Pat Aylward =

American-born Irish hurler

Personal information
- Native name: Pádraig Aighleart (Irish)
- Nickname: Dexter
- Born: 12 November 1899 New York City, United States
- Died: July 1930 (aged 30) New York City, United States
- Occupation: NYPD officer

Sport
- Sport: Hurling
- Position: Midfield
Clubs
- Years: Club
- Ballyhale; C. J. Kickhams
Club titles
- Dublin titles: 1
Inter-county
- Years: County
- 1921-1922 1924-1925: Kilkenny; Dublin
Inter-county titles
- Leinster titles: 2
- All-Irelands: 2

Patrick Joseph "Dexter" Aylward (12 November 1899 - July 1930) was an American-born Irish hurler. Usually lining out at midfield, he enjoyed All-Ireland Championship success with Kilkenny in 1922 and with Dublin in 1924.

Aylward enjoyed a brief club career with Ballyhale before later joining the C. J. Kickhams club in Dublin. He won his sole county championship medal in 1924.

After being selected for the Kilkenny senior team in 1921, Aylward held his position on the team for the following two championship seasons. He won his first Leinster medal in 1922 before later winning his first All-Ireland medal after Kilkenny's defeat of Tipperary in the final. Aylward later joined the Dublin senior team, with whom he won a second set of Leinster and All-Ireland medals in 1924. His brother, Bob Aylward, later won an All-Ireland medal with Kilkenny in 1939.

== Honours ==
C. J. Kickhams

- Dublin Senior Hurling Championship (1): 1924

Kilkenny

- All-Ireland Senior Hurling Championship (1): 1922
- Leinster Senior Hurling Championship (1): 1922

Dublin

- All-Ireland Senior Hurling Championship (1): 1924
- Leinster Senior Hurling Championship (1): 1924

Sporting positions
Preceded by Frank Wall	Dublin Senior Hurling Captain; 1925	Succeeded by
