= Jack Hoyne =

Irish hurler (1880–unknown)

Personal information
- Native name: Seán Ó hEoghain (Irish)
- Born: 28 February 1880 Tullaroan, County Kilkenny, Ireland
- Died: Unknown
- Occupation: Farmer

Sport
- Sport: Hurling
- Position: Full-back
Club
- Years: Club
- Tullaroan
Club titles
- Kilkenny titles: 7
Inter-county
- Years: County
- 1902–1907: Kilkenny
Inter-county titles
- Leinster titles: 4
- All-Irelands: 2

Jack Hoyne (born 28 February 1880) was an Irish hurler who played as a full-back for the Kilkenny senior team.

Born in Tullaroan, County Kilkenny, Hoyne first arrived on the inter-county scene at the age of twenty-one when he first linked up with the Kilkenny senior team. He made his senior debut during the 1902 championship. Hoyne went on to become a regular member of the starting fifteen and won two All-Ireland medals and four Leinster medals.

At club level Hoyne was a seven-time county championship medallist with Tullaroan.

Hoyne retired from inter-county hurling during the 1907 championship.

== Playing career ==
=== Club ===
Hoyne joined the Tullaroan senior team at the turn of the century and, in 1901, he lined out in his first championship decider. A high-scoring 5–10 to 3–7 defeat of Threecastles gave him his first championship medal.

In 1902 Tullaroan reached yet another final. Mooncoin provided little opposition as Tullaroan powered to a 3–16 to 0–1 victory. It was Hoyne's second championship medal.

Three-in-a-row proved beyond Tullaroan, however, they qualified for a third final in four seasons in 1904. Once again the game turned into a mismatch, as a 6–14 to 1–6 defeat of Piltown gave Hoyne a third championship medal.

After two seasons out of the limelight, Tullaroan were back in the championship decider again in 1907. A 2–6 to 1–3 defeat of Mooncoin gave Hoyne his fourth championship medal.

Hoyne added a fifth championship medal to his collection in 1910 following a 7–1 to 3–0 defeat of Piltown. Tullaroan retained the title the following year, with Hoyne claiming a sixth championship medal following a 4–3 to 2–5 defeat of Mooncoin.

In 1915 Hoyne was in the twilight of his career when he lined out in his final championship decider. A 7–2 to 2–2 defeat of Dicksboro gave him his seventh and final championship medal.

=== Inter-county ===
Hoyne made his debut with the Kilkenny senior team during the 1902 championship, however, their campaign ended in a single-point defeat by Dublin in the Leinster decider.

In 1903 Hoyne picked up his first Leinster medal. The game against Dublin ended in a 1–5 apiece draw, however, Kilkenny were subsequently awarded the title by the Leinster Council. Hoyne's side later trounced Antrim before lining out against Cork in the All-Ireland home final which wasn't played until 11 July 1905. Cork's Andy "Dooric" Buckley scored at least six goals as Kilkenny were humiliated by 8–9 to 0–8.

Hoyne added a second Leinster medal to his collection in 1904 as Kilkenny recorded a 2–8 to 2–6 defeat of Dublin in the provincial decider. The subsequent All-Ireland final was delayed until 24 June 1906, with three-in-a-row hopefuls Cork providing the opposition. It was the beginning of a hugely successful era for "the Cats" as Cork were heading into decline. A first half goal by Dick Doyle put Kilkenny in the driving seat, while goalkeeper Pat "Fox" Maher made a great save in the dying moments of the game to help Kilkenny to a 1–9 to 1–8 victory. It was Hoyne's and Kilkenny's first All-Ireland triumph.

In 1905 Hoyne won a third successive Leinster medal as Dublin were once again bested by 2–8 to 2–2. The subsequent All-Ireland final on 14 April 1907 saw Cork provide the opposition once again. The game was a high-scoring affair with Cork winning by 5–10 to 3–13. The game, however, had to be replayed as Cork goalkeeper Daniel McCarthy was a British army reservist and Kilkenny’s Matt Gargan had earlier played with Waterford in the Munster championship. The replay was another high-scoring one, with Jimmy Kelly scoring 5–2 for Kilkenny. A puck-out by Cork's Jamesy Kelleher is said to have bounced and hopped over the Kilkenny crossbar. Kilkenny won the game by 7–7 to 2–9, with all seven of their goals coming in a thirty-minute spell. It was Hoyne's second All-Ireland medal.

Kilkenny lost their provincial crown to Dublin in 1906 as the Tullaroan players withdrew from the team in a dispute over the selection policy, however, the team returned in 1907 with Hoyne capturing a fourth Leinster medal following a 4–14 to 1–9 defeat of Dublin.

== Honours ==
=== Team ===
Tulalroan

- Kilkenny Senior Hurling Championship (7): 1901, 1902, 1904, 1907, 1910, 1911, 1915

Kilkenny

- All-Ireland Senior Hurling Championship (2): 1904, 1905
- Leinster Senior Hurling Championship (4): 1903, 1904, 1905, 1907
