= Mick Hickey =

Mick Hickey may refer to:

- Mick Hickey (Waterford hurler) (1911–1998)
- Mick Hickey (Limerick hurler) (1912–1992)

== See also ==
- Mike Hickey, baseball player
- Michael Hickey (disambiguation)
