= Tommy Carroll (hurler) =

Irish hurler (1898–1979)

Personal information
- Native name: Tomás Ó Cearúill (Irish)
- Born: 12 January 1898 Mooncoin, County Kilkenny, Ireland
- Died: 22 February 1979 (aged 81) Waterford, Ireland
- Occupation: Farmer

Sport
- Sport: Hurling
- Position: Right wing-back
Club
- Years: Club
- 1922-1936: Mooncoin
Club titles
- Kilkenny titles: 3
Inter-county
- Years: County
- 1922-1931: Kilkenny
Inter-county titles
- Leinster titles: 6
- All-Irelands: 1
- NHL: 0

Thomas Carroll (12 January 1898 – 22 February 1979) was an Irish hurler. Usually lining out at left corner-back or right wing-back, he was a member of the Kilkenny team that won the 1922 All-Ireland Championship.

Carroll began his club career playing with Clonmore in the junior championship. He later enjoyed a lengthy career at senior level with Mooncoin. Carroll won county senior championship medals in 1927, 1932 and in 1936 as captain of the team.

After being selected for the Kilkenny senior team in 1922, he held his position as a back for much of the next decade. He won his first Leinster medal in 1922 before later winning his sole All-Ireland medal after Kilkenny's defeat of Tipperary in the final. Carroll won a further five Leinster medals in 1923, 1925, 1926, 1929 and 1931 and was an All-Ireland runner-up in 1926 and 1931.

Carroll died after a short illness on 22 February 1979.

== Honours ==
Mooncoin

- Kilkenny Senior Hurling Championship (3): 1927, 1932, 1936 (c)

Kilkenny

- All-Ireland Senior Hurling Championship (1): 1922
- Leinster Senior Hurling Championship (6): 1922, 1923, 1925, 1926, 1929, 1931
