= Tom Butler (hurler) =

Irish hurler (1902–1984)

Personal information
- Native name: Tomás de Buitléir (Irish)
- Born: 1902 Thurles, County Tipperary, Ireland
- Died: 22 April 1984 (aged 81–82)

Sport
- Sport: Hurling
- Position: Goalkeeper
Club
- Years: Club
- 1920-1940: Thurles Sarsfields
Club titles
- Tipperary titles: 5
Inter-county
- Years: County
- 1927-1939: Tipperary
Inter-county titles
- Munster titles: 1
- All-Irelands: 1
- NHL: 1

Tom Butler (1902 – 22 April 1984) was an Irish hurler who played as a goalkeeper for the Tipperary senior team.

Butler made his first appearance for the team during the 1927 championship and was a regular player over the course of the next decade. During that time he won one All-Ireland winners' medal, one Munster winner's medal and one National Hurling League winners' medal.

At club level, he enjoyed a successful career with Thurles Sarsfields, winning five county club championship winners' medals.

Butler became involved in team management following his retirement from playing. He trained Tipperary to the All-Ireland title in 1945.

Achievements
Preceded by Jim 'Tough' Barry	All-Ireland Senior Hurling Final winning trainer 1945	Succeeded by Jim 'Tough' Barry
