= Mick Lonergan =

Irish hurler

Personal information
- Native name: Mícheál Ó Longargáin (Irish)
- Born: 1940 (age 85–86) Littleton, County Tipperary, Ireland

Sport
- Sport: Hurling
- Position: Full-back
Club
- Years: Club
- Moycarkey–Borris
Club titles
- Tipperary titles: 0
Inter-county
Years	County	Apps (scores)
1962-1967	Tipperary	2 (0-0)
Inter-county titles
- Munster titles: 0
- All-Irelands: 1
- NHL: 0
- All Stars: 0

Mick Lonergan (born 1940) is an Irish retired hurler who played as a full-back for the Tipperary senior team.

Lonergan joined the team during the 1962 championship and was a semi-regular member of the team until he retired from inter-county hurling after the 1967 championship. He made his debut coming on as a substitute in the 1964 All-Ireland Senior Hurling Championship and also came on in the 1967 final defeat. During that time he won one All-Ireland winners' medal on the field of play.

At club level Lonergan played with the Moycarkey–Borris club.

== Honours ==
Tipperary

- All-Ireland Senior Hurling Championship (1): 1964
