= Joe Delahunty =

Irish hurler

Personal information
- Native name: Seosamh Ó Dulchaointigh (Irish)
- Born: 18 March 1888 Mooncoin, County Kilkenny, Ireland
- Died: 11 March 1966 (aged 77) Mooncoin, County Kilkenny, Ireland
- Occupation: Farmer

Sport
- Sport: Hurling
- Position: Left wing-back
Club
- Years: Club
- 1906-1918: Mooncoin
Club titles
- Kilkenny titles: 5
Inter-county
- Years: County
- 1909: Kilkenny
Inter-county titles
- All-Irelands: 1

Joseph Delahunty (18 March 1888 – 11 March 1966) was an Irish hurler. Usually lining out as a half-back, he was a member of the Kilkenny team that won the 1909 All-Ireland Championship.

Delahunty played his club hurling with Mooncoin and enjoyed much success in a twelve-year career. He won his first county championship medal in 1906 before adding a second in 1908. Delahunty ended his club career with three successive championship titles between 1916 and 1918.

After missing Kilkenny's Leinster final defeat of Laois, Delahunty was added to the team for the subsequent All-Ireland final against Tipperary. A 4-06 to 0-12 victory gave him his sole All-Ireland medal.

Delahunty was married to Anastasia (née Fewer) from 1926 until her death in 1963. He died after a short illness on 11 March 1966.

== Honours ==
Mooncoin

- Kilkenny Senior Hurling Championship (5): 1906, 1908, 1916, 1917, 1918

Kilkenny

- All-Ireland Senior Hurling Championship (1): 1909
