= Ned Lambe =

Irish hurler

Personal information
- Native name: Éamonn Ó Luain (Irish)
- Nickname: Ned
- Born: 1866 Drombane, County Tipperary, Ireland
- Died: Unknown
- Occupation: Farmer

Sport
- Sport: Hurling
Club
- Years: Club
- Upperchurch–Drombane
Club titles
- Tipperary titles: 1
Inter-county
- Years: County
- 1887: Tipperary
Inter-county titles
- All-Irelands: 1

Edmond Lambe (born 1866) was an Irish hurler who played for the Tipperary senior team.

Lambe made his first appearance for the team during the inaugural championship of 1887. During that successful year he won one All-Ireland medal.

At club level Lambe was a one-time county club championship medalist with Upperchurch–Drombane.
