= Tom Kenna =

Irish hurler

Personal information
- Native name: Tomás Mac Cionaoith (Irish)
- Born: 1893 Thurles, County Tipperary, Ireland
- Died: Unknown
- Occupation: Mason

Sport
- Sport: Hurling
Club
- Years: Club
- 1900s-1910s: Thurles Sarsfield's
Club titles
- Tipperary titles: 6
Inter-county
- Years: County
- 1906-1908: Tipperary
Inter-county titles
- Munster titles: 1
- All-Irelands: 2

Thomas Kenna (born 1893) was an Irish hurler who played for the Tipperary senior team.

Kenna joined the team during the 1906 championship and was a regular member of the starting fifteen until his retirement after the 1908 championship. During that time he won two All-Ireland medals and one Munster medal.

At club level Kenna won numerous county championship medals with Thurles Sarsfields.
