= Patrick O'Brien (hurler) =

Irish hurler (1873–1942)

Personal information
- Native name: Pádraig Ó Briain (Irish)
- Born: 2 March 1873 Kilfinane, County Limerick, Ireland
- Died: 10 November 1942 (aged 69) Kilfinane, County Limerick, Ireland
- Occupation: Labourer

Sport
- Sport: Hurling
- Position: Right wing-back
Club
- Years: Club
- Kilfinane
Inter-county
- Years: County
- 1897–1899: Limerick
Inter-county titles
- Munster titles: 1
- All-Irelands: 1

Patrick O'Brien (2 March 1873 – 10 November 1942) was an Irish hurler. He played with Kilfinane at club level and was part of the Limerick team that won the 1897 All-Ireland SHC title.

== Career ==
Born and raised in Kilfinane, County Limerick, O'Brien first played hurling with Kilfinane Hurling Club in the early years of the Gaelic Athletic Association. He was part of the team that secured Limerick SHC title wins in 1897 and 1899.

Kilfinane were the Limerick representatives at inter-county level in 1897. O'Brien won a Munster SHC medal that year, following a 4–09 to 1–06 win over Cork. He was again part of the Limerick team that subsequently had a one-goal win over Kilkenny in the 1897 All-Ireland SHC final. O'Brien won a Croke Cup title in July 1899, following another victory over Kilkenny.

== Personal life and death ==
His great-grandson, Andy O'Brien, is a former professional footballer who played for Bradford City, Newcastle United and Leeds United. He was a member of the Republic of Ireland squad at the 2002 FIFA World Cup.

O'Brien died on 10 November 1942, at the age of 69.

== Honours ==
Kilfinane

- Limerick Senior Hurling Championship (2): 1897, 1899

Limerick

- All-Ireland Senior Hurling Championship (1): 1897
- Munster Senior Hurling Championship (1): 1897
- Croke Cup (1): 1897
