= Tom Fleming (hurler) =

Irish hurler

Personal information
- Native name: Tomás Pléimeann (Irish)
- Born: 11 January 1901 Bohermore, Galway, Ireland
- Died: 19 May 1960 (aged 59) Prospect Hill, Galway, Ireland
- Occupation: Painter

Sport
- Sport: Hurling
- Position: Full-back
Club
- Years: Club
- Galway City
Club titles
- Galway titles: 0
Inter-county
- Years: County
- 1923-1929: Galway
Inter-county titles
- All-Irelands: 1
- NHL: 0

Thomas Aloysius Fleming (11 January 1901 – 19 May 1960) was an Irish hurler. Usually lining out at full-back, he was a member of the Galway team that won the 1923 All-Ireland Championship.

Fleming enjoyed a club career with Galway City that spanned three decades, however, he enjoyed little in terms of championship success.

After being selected for the Galway senior team in 1923 Fleming won his sole All-Ireland medal in his debut championship after Galway's defeat of Limerick in the final. He was a runner-up in two subsequent All-Ireland finals and retired from inter-county hurling in 1929.

In retirement from playing, Fleming took an active role in Galway County Board administrative affairs and organised several new clubs in his local area. He was also prominent in boxing circles and was an official at many tournaments.

Fleming was also a member of the Old IRA and had an active role during the War of Independence. A lifelong trade unionist, he was President of the Galway branch of the Irish Transport and General Workers' Union. Fleming died after suffering a heart attack on 19 May 1960.

== Honours ==
Galway

- All-Ireland Senior Hurling Championship (1): 1923
