= Jackie Goode =

Irish hurler

Personal information
- Native name: Seánie Gud (Irish)
- Born: 16 February 1924 Dungarvan, County Waterford, Ireland
- Died: 15 December 1986 (aged 62) Waterford, Ireland
- Occupation: Tannery worker
- Height: 5 ft 8 in (173 cm)

Sport
- Sport: Hurling
- Position: Left corner-back
Club
- Years: Club
- Dungarvan
Club titles
	Football	Hurling
Waterford titles	5	0
Inter-county
- Years: County
- 1942–1954: Waterford
Inter-county titles
- Munster titles: 1
- All-Irelands: 1
- NHL: 0

John Francis "Jackie" Goode (16 February 1924 – 15 December 1986) was an Irish hurler who played as a left corner-back for the Waterford senior team.

Born in Dungarvan, County Waterford, Goode first played competitive hurling in his youth. He subsequently became a regular member of the starting fifteen of the Waterford senior team and won one All-Ireland medal and one Munster medal.

As a member of the Munster inter-provincial on a number of occasions Goode won five Railway Cup medals. At club level he was a five-time championship medallist as a Gaelic footballer with Dungarvan.

Goode retired from inter-county hurling following the conclusion of the 1954 championship.

== Honours ==
=== Team ===
Dungarvan

- Waterford Senior Football Championship (5): 1945, 1946, 1947, 1948, 1954

Waterford

- All-Ireland Senior Hurling Championship (1): 1948
- Munster Senior Hurling Championship (1): 1948

Munster

- Railway Cup (5): 1948, 1949, 1951, 1952, 1953
