= Dick Brennan (hurler) =

Irish hurler

Personal information
- Native name: Risteard Ó Braonáin (Irish)
- Born: 1886 Kilkenny, Ireland
- Died: 7 March 1963 (aged 76) Kilkenny, Ireland
- Occupation: Blacksmith

Sport
- Sport: Hurling
- Position: Full-forward
Club
- Years: Club
- Erin's Own
Inter-county
- Years: County
- 1904-1913: Kilkenny
Inter-county titles
- Leinster titles: 2
- All-Irelands: 2

Richard Brennan (1886 - 7 March 1963) was an Irish hurler whose championship career with the Kilkenny senior team spanned nine years from 1904 to 1913.

Born in Kilkenny, Brennan first played competitive hurling in his youth. He quickly became involved with the Erin's Own club, eventually becoming a key member of the senior team.

Brennan made his debut on the inter-county scene when he was picked on the Kilkenny senior team for the first time in 1904. He won his first All-Ireland medal that year, however, he was later dropped from the starting team. Brennan remained on the panel during Kilkenny's first great era and was recalled to the team in 1913. He won a second All-Ireland medal that year, while he also won two Leinster medals.

== Honours ==
Cork

- All-Ireland Senior Hurling Championship (2): 1904, 1913
- Leinster Senior Hurling Championship (5): 1904 (sub), 1913
