= Thady O'Connor =

Irish hurler

Personal information
- Native name: Tadhg Ó Conchubhair (Irish)
- Born: 1867 Aghabullogue, County Cork, Ireland
- Died: 24 April 1951 (aged 84) Aghabullogue, County Cork, Ireland
- Occupation: Farm labourer

Sport
- Sport: Hurling
Club
- Years: Club
- Aghabullogue
Club titles
- Cork titles: 1
Inter-county*
Years	County	Apps (scores)
1890	Cork	2
Inter-county titles
- Munster titles: 1
- All-Irelands: 1
- *Inter County team apps and scores correct as of 18:00, 1 August 2016.

Timothy "Thady" O'Connor (1867 - 24 April 1951) was an Irish hurler who played for the Cork senior team.

Born in Aghabullogue, County Cork, O'Connor first played competitive hurling in his youth. He came to prominence with the Aghabullogue club, winning one championship medal in 1890. Aghabullogue subsequently represented Cork in the inter-county series of games, with O'Connor winning a set of All-Ireland and Munster medals.

O'Connor worked initially as a coachman before finding employment as a farm labourer. At the time of his death he was the last surviving member of Cork's 1890 All-Ireland-winning team.

== Honours ==
=== Player ===
Aghabullogue

- Cork Senior Hurling Championship (1): 1890

Cork

- All-Ireland Senior Hurling Championship: 1890
- Leinster Senior Hurling Championship (4): 1890
