= Michael Downes =

Irish hurler

Personal information
- Native name: Mícheál Ó Dúnaigh (Irish)
- Born: 21 October 1868 Kilfinane, County Limerick, Ireland
- Died: 21 May 1943 (aged 74) Kilfinane, County Limerick, Ireland
- Occupation: Plasterer

Sport
- Sport: Hurling
- Position: Left half-back
Club
- Years: Club
- Kilfinane
Club titles
- Limerick titles: 2
Inter-county
- Years: County
- Limerick
Inter-county titles
- Munster titles: 1
- All-Irelands: 1

Michael Downes (21 October 1868 – 21 May 1943) was an Irish hurler who played with the Limerick senior team.

Born in Kilfinane, County Limerick, Downes first played competitive hurling in his youth. He quickly established himself on the Kilfinane team and won county senior championship medals in 1897 and 1899.

After success at club level, Downes joined the Limerick senior team. He was part of the team that won All-Ireland, Munster, and Croke Cup titles in 1897.

== Honours ==
Kilfinane

- Limerick Senior Hurling Championship (2): 1897, 1899

Limerick

- All-Ireland Senior Hurling Championship (1): 1897
- Munster Senior Hurling Championship (1): 1897
- Croke Cup (1): 1897
