= Tom Murphy (Mooncoin hurler) =

Irish hurler

Personal information
- Native name: Tomás Ó Murchú (Irish)
- Born: 19 March 1969 (age 57) Mooncoin, County Wexford, Ireland
- Occupation: Electrician
- Height: 6 ft 0 in (183 cm)

Sport
- Sport: Hurling
- Position: Centre-forward
Club
- Years: Club
- Mooncoin
Club titles
- Kilkenny titles: 0
Inter-county
- Years: County
- 1990-1993: Kilkenny
Inter-county titles
- Leinster titles: 3
- All-Irelands: 1
- NHL: 0
- All Stars: 0

Thomas Murphy (born 19 March 1969) is an Irish former hurler. At club level he played with Mooncoin and was a member of the Kilkenny senior hurling team. Murphy lined out in defence and as a forward.

== Playing career ==
Murphy played hurling at juvenile and underage levels with the Mooncoin club, before progressing onto the club's top adult team with whom he won two Kilkenny Intermediate Championship titles. Murphy first appeared on the inter-county scene as a member of the Kilkenny minor team before later winning an All-Ireland Under-21 Championship title. A season with the Kilkenny junior team yielded an All-Ireland Junior Championship title, a victory which resulted in him being drafted onto the Kilkenny senior hurling team. Murphy went on to line out in three consecutive All-Ireland finals at senior level and, after defeat by Tipperary in 1991, claimed consecutive winners' medals after coming on as a substitute against Cork in 1992 and Galway in 1993. His other honours at senior level include three consecutive Leinster Championship medals.

== Honours ==
Mooncoin

- Kilkenny Intermediate Hurling Championship: 1990, 1994

Kilkenny

- All-Ireland Senior Hurling Championship: 1992, 1993
- Leinster Senior Hurling Championship: 1991, 1992, 1993
- All-Ireland Junior Hurling Championship: 1990
- Leinster Junior Hurling Championship: 1990
- All-Ireland Under-21 Hurling Championship: 1990
- Leinster Under-21 Hurling Championship: 1988, 1990
