= Michael Parker (hurler) =

Irish hurler

Michael Parker (9 August 1881 – 20 August 1958) was an Irish hurler. He was a member of the Wexford team that won the All-Ireland Championship in 1910.

== Honours ==
Wexford

- All-Ireland Senior Hurling Championship (1): 1910
- Leinster Senior Hurling Championship (1): 1910
