= Jimmy Harney =

Irish hurler (1905-1975)

Personal information
- Native name: Séamus Ó hAthairne (Irish)
- Born: 21 October 1905 Thurles, County Tipperary, Ireland
- Died: 16 October 1975 (aged 69) Thurles, County Tipperary, Ireland

Sport
- Sport: Hurling
- Position: Left corner-forward
Club
- Years: Club
- Thurles Sarsfields
Club titles
- Tipperary titles: 1
Inter-county
- Years: County
- 1930: Tipperary
Inter-county titles
- Munster titles: 1
- All-Irelands: 1
- NHL: 0

James Harney (21 October 1905 – 16 October 1975) was an Irish hurler who played as a left corner-forward for club side Thurles Sarsfields and at inter-county level with the Tipperary senior hurling team.

== Honours ==
Thurles Sarsfields

- Tipperary Senior Hurling Championship (1): 1929

Tipperary

- All-Ireland Senior Hurling Championship (1): 1930
- Munster Senior Hurling Championship (1): 1930
