= Dave Murnane =

Irish hurler

Personal information
- Native name: Daithí Ó Murnáin (Irish)
- Born: 30 August 1893 Lough Gur, County Limerick, Ireland
- Died: 16 May 1925 (aged 31) Limerick, Ireland
- Occupation: Carpenter

Sport
- Sport: Hurling
- Position: Full-back
Club
- Years: Club
- Fedamore
Club titles
- Limerick titles: 0
Inter-county
- Years: County
- 1920-1924: Limerick
Inter-county titles
- Munster titles: 2
- All-Irelands: 1

David Murnane (30 August 1893 – 16 May 1925) was an Irish hurler. Usually lining out as a full-back, he was a member of the Limerick team that won the 1921 All-Ireland Championship.

== Honours ==
Limerick

- All-Ireland Senior Hurling Championship (1): 1921
- Munster Senior Hurling Championship (2): 1921, 1923
