= Jim Shortle =

Irish hurler

Personal information
- Native name: Séamus Soirtéil (Irish)
- Born: 30 March 1883 Castlebridge, County Wexford, Ireland
- Died: 10 September 1945 (aged 62) Castlebridge, County Wexford, Ireland
- Occupation: Farmer

Sport
- Sport: Hurling
Club
- Years: Club
- Castlebridge
Inter-county
- Years: County
- Wexford
Inter-county titles
- Leinster titles: 1
- All-Irelands: 1

James Joseph Shortle (30 March 1883 – 10 September 1945) was an Irish hurler. He was a member of the Wexford team that won the All-Ireland Championship in 1910.

== Honours ==
Wexford

- All-Ireland Senior Hurling Championship (1): 1910
- Leinster Senior Hurling Championship (1): 1910
