= Billy Moloughney =

Irish hurler

Personal information
- Native name: Liam Ó Maolfhachtna (Irish)
- Born: 1932 (age 93–94) Puckane, County Tipperary, Ireland

Sport
- Sport: Hurling
- Position: Full-forward
Club
- Years: Club
- 1950s-1960s: Kildangan
Club titles
- Tipperary titles: 0
Inter-county
- Years: County
- 1959-1961: Tipperary
Inter-county titles
- Munster titles: 1
- All-Irelands: 1
- NHL: 2

William Moloughney (born 1932) is an Irish retired hurler who played as a full-forward for the Tipperary senior team.

Moloughney made his first appearance for the team during the 1959 championship and was a regular member of the starting fifteen for three full seasons. During that time he won one All-Ireland medal, one Munster medal and two National Hurling League medals.

At club level Moloughney enjoyed a lengthy career with Kildangan.
