= Paddy Hayes (hurler) =

Irish hurler (1921–1993)

Personal information
- Native name: Pádraig Ó hAodha (Irish)
- Born: 23 April 1921 Ballinlough, Cork, Ireland
- Died: 19 August 1993 (aged 72) Wellington Road, Cork, Ireland

Sport
- Sport: Hurling
- Position: Centre-back
Club
- Years: Club
- 1939-1953: Blackrock
Club titles
- Cork titles: 0
Inter-county
Years	County	Apps (scores)
1941-1944	Cork	3 (0-00)
Inter-county titles
- Munster titles: 1
- All-Irelands: 1
- NHL: 0

Patrick Hayes (23 April 1921 — 19 August 1993) was an Irish hurler. At club level he played with Blackrock and at inter-county level with the Cork senior hurling team.

== Career ==
Hayes first played hurling to a high standard as a student at Ballinlough National School in Cork. Three years after leaving school he first played for Cork as a member of the minor team. Hayes won a Munster MHC medal after an 8-03 to 0-02 defeat of Clare, before ending the season at right wing-back for Cork's 5-02 to 2-02 defeat of Kilkenny in the 1939 All-Ireland MHC final.

Hayes was just out of the minor grade when he joined the Blackrock club's senior team. He lined out in Blackrock's defeat by Glen Rovers in the 1939 Cork SHC final. Hayes spent 14 years with the Blackrock senior team but ended his career without a Cork SHC medal after another final defeat in 1948. He also spent a period of time as team captain.

After joining the team for the first time in 1941, Hayes made his Cork senior hurling team debut when he came on as a substitute for Alan Lotty in the 1943 Munster final defeat of Waterford. He was an unused substitute when Cork beat Antrim by 5-16 to 0-04 in the 1943 All-Ireland final. Hayes played in Cork's first two Munster SHC games in 1944 before being dropped from the team for the 1944 Munster final replay defeat of Limerick.

== Personal life ==
Hayes died in Marymount Hospice in Cork on 19 August 1993, at the age of 72.

== Honours ==
Cork

- All-Ireland Senior Hurling Championship: 1943
- Munster Senior Hurling Championship: 1943
- All-Ireland Minor Hurling Championship: 1939
- Munster Minor Hurling Championship: 1939
