= Tom McGrath (Clare hurler) =

Irish hurler (1888–1977)

Personal information
- Nickname: Colonel Tom
- Born: 13 June 1888 O'Callaghan's Mills, County Clare, Ireland
- Died: 30 September 1977 (aged 89) Tallaght, Dublin, Ireland
- Occupation: Army officer

Sport
- Sport: Hurling
Club
- Years: Club
- O'Callaghan's Mills
Club titles
- Clare titles: 4
Inter-county
- Years: County
- Clare
Inter-county titles
- Munster titles: 1
- All-Irelands: 1

Thomas Ryan (13 June 1888 – 30 September 1977) was an Irish hurler. At club level he played with O'Callaghan's Mills, and also lined out at inter-county level with the Clare senior hurling team.

== Career ==
McGrath first played hurling in his local area with the O'Callaghan's Mills club. During a golden age for the club, he was part of the Clare SHC-winning teams in 1904, 1906, 1909 and 1910. McGrath's performances at club level quickly earned him a call-up to the Clare senior hurling team. He won a Munster SHC medal in 1914, before later lining out at midfield in Clare's defeat of Laois in the 1914 All-Ireland final. McGrath continued to play for Clare until 1927.

== Personal life and death ==
McGrath was still an active player when he served as chairman of the Clare County Board between 1917 and 1920, while he also refereed the 1920 All-Ireland final between Dublin and Cork. He was a leading figure in the Irish Republican Army during the War of Independence. McGrath was second in command to Michael Brennan in the East Clare IRA Brigade and saw action in the Glenwood and Cratloe ambushes. He later became an officer in the Free State Army and rose to the rank of Colonel in the Irish Army. He was founder-director in 1931 of the Army Ordnance Service. After moving to Dublin, McGrath resumed his GAA activities and served as chairman of the Dublin County Board. He was also president of the committee that organised the GAA's golden jubilee celebrations in 1934.

Ryan died at the Adelaide Hospital, Dublin on 30 September 1977, at the age of 89.

== Honours ==
O'Callaghan's Mills

- Clare Senior Hurling Championship: 1904, 1906, 1909, 1910

Clare

- All-Ireland Senior Hurling Championship: 1914
- Munster Senior Hurling Championship: 1914
