= Paddy Brolan =

Irish hurler

Personal information
- Native name: Pádraig Ó Brealláin (Irish)
- Born: 26 October 1881 Thurles, County Tipperary, Ireland
- Died: 21 July 1956 (aged 74) Thurles, County Tipperary, Ireland
- Occupation: General labourer

Sport
- Sport: Hurling
Club
- Years: Club
- 1900s-1910s: Thurles Sarsfield's
Club titles
- Tipperary titles: 6
Inter-county
- Years: County
- 1906-1919: Tipperary
Inter-county titles
- Munster titles: 3
- All-Irelands: 2

Patrick Brolan (26 October 1881 – 21 July 1956) was an Irish hurler who played for the Tipperary senior team.

Brolan joined the team during the 1906 championship and was a regular member of the starting fifteen until his retirement after the 1919 championship. During that time he won two All-Ireland medals and three Munster medals.

At club level Brolan won numerous county championship medals with Thurles Sarsfield's.
