= Mick Hayes (hurler) =

Irish hurler

Personal information
- Native name: Mícheál Ó hAodha (Irish)
- Born: Butlerstown, County Waterford
- Height: 5 ft 11 in (180 cm)

Sport
- Sport: Hurling
- Position: Half-back
Club
- Years: Club
- 1930s-1950s: Butlerstown
Club titles
- Waterford titles: 0
Inter-county
- Years: County
- 1940s-1950s: Waterford
Inter-county titles
- Munster titles: 1
- All-Irelands: 1

Mick Hayes (1921 – 4 August 2003) was an Irish sportsman. He played hurling with his local club Butlerstown and was a member of the Waterford senior inter-county team in the 1940s and 1950s. Hayes is regarded as one of Waterford's greatest-ever players.
