= Jackie Condon (hurler) =

Irish hurler

Personal information
- Native name: Seán Condún (Irish)
- Born: 1938 (age 87–88) Waterford, Ireland
- Occupation: Cabinet maker
- Height: 5 ft 10 in (178 cm)

Sport
- Sport: Hurling
- Position: Left wing-back
Club
- Years: Club
- Erin's Own
Club titles
- Waterford titles: 1
Inter-county
- Years: County
- Waterford
Inter-county titles
- Munster titles: 1
- All-Irelands: 1
- NHL: 0

Jackie Condon (born 1938) is an Irish retired hurler who played as a right wing-back for club side Erin's Own and at inter-county level with the Waterford senior hurling team.

== Honours ==
Erin's Own

- Waterford Senior Hurling Championship (1): 1962

Waterford

- All-Ireland Senior Hurling Championship (1): 1959
- Munster Senior Hurling Championship (1): 1959
