= Paddy Saunders =

Irish hurler

Personal information
- Native name: Pádraig Mac Sandair (Irish)
- Born: Ballycallan, County Kilkenny

Sport
- Sport: Hurling
- Position: Half-back
Club
- Years: Club
- Tullaroan
Inter-county
- Years: County
- 1902-1904: Kilkenny
Inter-county titles
- Leinster titles: 1
- All-Irelands: 1

Paddy Saunders was an Irish sportsperson. He played hurling with his local club Tullaroan and with the Kilkenny senior inter-county team from 1902 until 1904.
