= John Reidy =

Irish hurler

Personal information
- Native name: Seán Ó Riada (Irish)
- Born: 8 November 1875 Ballingarry, County Limerick, Ireland
- Died: 21 June 1910 (aged 34) Ballingarry, County Limerick, Ireland
- Occupation: Farmer

Sport
- Sport: Hurling
- Position: Goalkeeper
Club
- Years: Club
- Ballingarry
Inter-county
- Years: County
- Limerick
Inter-county titles
- Munster titles: 1
- All-Irelands: 1

John Reidy (8 November 1875 – 21 June 1910) was an Irish hurler who played as a goalkeeper for the Limerick senior team.

Born in Ballingarry, County Limerick, Reidy first played competitive hurling in his youth. He was a regular for the Limerick senior hurling team during a successful period at the end of the 19th century. During his inter-county career he won one All-Ireland medal and one Munster medal.

At club level Reidy was a stalwart of the Ballingarry team.

In retirement from playing Reidy became involved in the administrative affairs of the Gaelic Athletic Association, having served as president of the Limerick County Board.

== Honours ==
Limerick

- All-Ireland Senior Hurling Championship (1): 1897
- Munster Senior Hurling Championship (1): 1897
