= Dick Morrissey (hurler) =

Irish hurler

Personal information
- Native name: Risteard Ó Muireasa (Irish)
- Born: 14 November 1894 Craughwell, County Galway, Ireland
- Died: 5 July 1977 (aged 82) Galway, Ireland

Sport
- Sport: Hurling
- Position: Centre-forward
Club
- Years: Club
- Craughwell
Club titles
- Galway titles: 4
Inter-county
- Years: County
- 1923-1929: Galway
Inter-county titles
- All-Irelands: 1
- NHL: 0

Richard Morrissey (14 November 1894 – 5 July 1977) was an Irish hurler who played as a centre-forward for the Galway senior team.

Morrissey made his first appearance for the team in the early 1920s and was a regular member of the starting fifteen for much of the rest of the decade. During that time he won one All-Ireland medal as Galway claimed their first championship in 1923. Morrissey was an All-Ireland runner-up on four occasions.

At club level Morrissey was a four-time county club championship medalist with Craughwell.
