= Ned McEvoy =

Irish hurler

Personal information
- Native name: Éamonn Mac Fhíobhuí (Irish)
- Nickname: Ned
- Born: 1886 Abbeyleix, Queen's County, Ireland
- Died: Unknown
- Occupation: Labourer

Sport
- Sport: Hurling
- Position: Full-back
Clubs
- Years: Club
- Abbeyleix; Thomas Davis
Club titles
- Kilkenny titles: 1
Inter-county
- Years: County
- Dublin; Laois
Inter-county titles
- Leinster titles: 2
- All-Irelands: 1

Edward P. McEvoy (born 1886) was an Irish hurler who played for the Dublin and Laois senior teams.

Born in Abbeyleix, County Laois, McEvoy first played competitive hurling and Gaelic football in his youth. He arrived on the inter-county scene when he first linked up with the Laois senior team before later joining the Dublin senior team before returning to Laois. McEvoy was a regular member of the starting fifteen, and won one All-Ireland medal and two Leinster medals. He was an All-Ireland runner-up on one occasion.

At club level McEvoy won several championship medals as a dual player with Abbeyleix. He also won a championship medal with the Thomas Davis club.

== Honours ==
=== Team ===
Thomas Davis

- Dublin Senior Hurling Championship (1): 1913

Abbeyleix

- Laois Senior Hurling Championship (1): 1927

Laois

- All-Ireland Senior Hurling Championship (1): 1915
- Leinster Senior Hurling Championship (2): 1914, 1915
