= Tom Teehan =

Irish hurler (1904–1992)

Thomas Teehan (24 March 1904 - 21 September 1992) was an Irish hurler who played as a right corner-back for the Dublin senior hurling team.
