= Mikey Maher =

Irish hurler

Personal information
- Native name: Mícheál Ó Meachair (Irish)
- Nickname: Big Mikey
- Born: 3 October 1874 Tubberadora, County Tipperary, Ireland
- Died: 18 May 1947 (aged 72) Galbally, County Limerick, Ireland
- Occupation: Farmer
- Height: 6 ft 3 in (191 cm)

Sport
- Sport: Hurling
- Position: Centre-forward
Club
- Years: Club
- Tubberadora
Club titles
- Tipperary titles: 3
Inter-county
- Years: County
- 1895-1904: Tipperary
Inter-county titles
- Munster titles: 5
- All-Irelands: 5

Michael Maher (3 October 1874 – 18 May 1947) was an Irish hurler. At club level he played with Tubberadora and at inter-county level with the Tipperary senior hurling team. Maher captained Tipperary to All-Ireland SHC titles in 1895, 1896 and 1898.

== Playing career ==
Born and raised in the townland of Nodstown near Holycross, County Tipperary, Maher first played hurling with Tubberadora Hurling Club. He captained the team to three Tipperary SHC titles in four years between 1895 and 1898.

Tubberadora were the Tipperary representatives at inter-county level following each of those title wins. Maher captained Tipperary to the Munster SHC title, before beating Kilkenny by 6–08 to 1–10 in the 1895 All-Ireland SHC final. He claimed a second consecutive Munster SHC medal the following year and was again the team captain for Tipperary's second consecutive All-Ireland SHC win, following the 8–14 to 0–04 win over Dublin.

After reclaiming the Munster SHC after a one-year lapse, Maher captained Tipperary to their third All-Ireland SHC win in four years, after a 7–13 to 3–10 win over Kilkenny in the 1898 All-Ireland SHC final. The Tubberadora club disbanded shortly after this win, however, Maher was invited to join the Horse & Jockey selection that represented Tipperary in 1899. He won a fourth All-Ireland SHC medal that year after a 3–12 to 1–04 defeat of Wexford in the final. He won a fifth All-Ireland SHC medal in six years after lining out in Tipperary's 2–05 to 0-06 defeat of London in 1900.

== Administrative career ==
Maher became involved in refereeing and administrative affairs follwoing his retirement from playing. He served as chairman of the Mid Tipperary Board, member of the Tipperary County Board, Munster Council delegate and Central Council member. Maher was also involved in the establishment of the Boherlahan–Dualla club in 1912.

== Personal life and death ==
Maher's older brother, Jack, was also part of Tubberadora and Tipperary's All-Ireland SHC wins of the 1890s. Two of his nephews, Sonny and Michael Maher, won numerous All-Ireland SHC medals with Tipperary between 1949 and 1965. Maher worked on the family farm until 1918 when he moved to a farm in Galbally, County Limerick.

Maher died from prostate cancer on 18 May 1947, at the age of 72.

== Honours ==
Tubberadora

- Tipperary Senior Hurling Championship (3): 1895 (c), 1896 (c), 1898 (c)

Tipperary

- All-Ireland Senior Hurling Championship (5): 1895 (c), 1896 (c), 1898 (c), 1899, 1900
- Munster Senior Hurling Championship (5): 1895 (c), 1896 (c), 1898 (c), 1899, 1900

Sporting positions
Preceded by	Tipperary senior hurling team captain 1895-1896	Succeeded by
Preceded by	Tipperary senior hurling team captain 1898	Succeeded by Tim Condon
Achievements
Preceded by Stephen Hayes	All-Ireland SHC final winning captain 1895	Succeeded by retained
Preceded by retained	All-Ireland SHC final winning captain 1896	Succeeded by Denis Grimes
Preceded by Denis Grimes	All-Ireland SHC final winning captain 1898	Succeeded by Tim Condon
