= Eddie Carew =

Irish hurler (1924–1997)

Personal information
- Native name: Éamonn Carrún (Irish)
- Born: 16 March 1924 Ferrybank, County Waterford, Ireland
- Died: 23 July 1997 (aged 73) Ferrybank, County Waterford, Ireland
- Occupation: CIÉ employee
- Height: 5 ft 10 in (178 cm)

Sport
- Sport: Hurling
- Position: Midfield
Clubs
- Years: Club
- Ferrybank; Erin's Own
Inter-county
- Years: County
- Waterford
Inter-county titles
- Munster titles: 1
- All-Irelands: 1
- NHL: 0

Edward J. "Ned" Carew (16 March 1924 – 23 July 1997) was an Irish hurler who played as a midfielder for the Waterford senior team.

Born in Ferrybank, County Waterford, Carew first played competitive hurling in his youth. He subsequently became a regular member of the starting fifteen of the Waterford senior team and won one All-Ireland medal and one Munster medal.

As a member of the Munster inter-provincial team on a number of occasions, Carew won one Railway Cup medal. At club level he won several championship medals with Ferrybank and Erin's Own.

== Honours ==
Waterford

- All-Ireland Senior Hurling Championship (1): 1948
- Munster Senior Hurling Championship (1): 1948

Munster

- Railway Cup (1): 1949
