= Willie John O'Connell =

Irish hurler

Personal information
- Native name: Liam Seán Ó Conaill (Irish)
- Born: 1869 Cork, Ireland
- Died: 25 April 1897 (aged 27–28) Cork, Ireland
- Occupation: Fitter

Sport
- Sport: Hurling
- Position: Quarter-back
Club
- Years: Club
- 1886-1897: St Finbarr's
Club titles
- Cork titles: 0
Inter-county
- Years: County
- 1893-1895 5: Cork
Inter-county titles
- Munster titles: 2
- All-Irelands: 2

Willie John O'Connell (1869-25 April 1897) was an Irish hurler who played as a quarter-back at senior level for the Cork county team.

O'Connell made his first appearance for the team during the 1893 championship and was a regular member of the team for the next three seasons. During that time he won two All-Ireland medals and two Munster medals.

At club level O'Connell played with the St Finbarr's club.

O'Connell died following a freak accident in a trial game following a clash with teammate Denis Coughlan. He was the first member of the Gaelic Athletic Association to die on the field of play.

== Playing career ==
=== Club ===
O'Connell played his club hurling with the St Finbarr's club. He was captain of the senior team from 1895 until his death in 1897.

=== Inter-county ===
O'Connell first came to prominence on the inter-county scene with Cork as part of the Blackrock selection in 1893. That year he lined out in his first provincial decider with All-Ireland champions Limerick providing the opposition. A rout developed as Cork defeated Limerick by 5–3 to 0-0. It was O'Connell's first Munster title. Kilkenny provided the opposition in the subsequent All-Ireland final. Cork won the game on probably the most unsuitable playing field in hurling history. After someone had neglected to get the grass cut at Ashtown, both teams moved to the Phoenix Park where the game took place. A 6–8 to 0–2 victory gave Young a second All-Ireland title.

For a second consecutive year O'Connell was selected for championship duty with Cork. An easy 3–4 to 1–2 defeat of Tipperary in the provincial decider gave him a third consecutive Munster winners' title. For the second time in three years Dublin provided the opposition in the subsequent All-Ireland final. The game turned into an absolute rout as Cork won easily by 5–20 to 2–0. With that O'Connell captured a second consecutive All-Ireland winners' medal. It was his last game with the Cork hurling team.

== Sources ==
- Corry, Eoghan, The GAA Book of Lists (Hodder Headline Ireland, 2005).
- Cronin, Jim, A Rebel Hundred: Cork's 100 All-Ireland Titles.
- Donegan, Des, The Complete Handbook of Gaelic Games (DBA Publications Limited, 2005).
