= Sim Donohoe =

Irish hurler

Simon Donohue (12 February 1879 – 17 January 1959) was an Irish hurler. He was a member of the Wexford team that won the All-Ireland Championship in 1910.

== Honours ==
Wexford

- All-Ireland Senior Hurling Championship (1): 1910
- Leinster Senior Hurling Championship (2): 1901, 1910
