= Patrick Flynn (hurler) =

Irish hurler

Personal information
- Native name: Padraig Ó Floinn (Irish)
- Born: 1867 Kilfinane, County Limerick, Ireland
- Died: February 1948 (aged 81) Limerick, Ireland

Sport
- Sport: Hurling
- Position: Right corner-forward
Club
- Years: Club
- Kilfinane
Club titles
- Limerick titles: 2
Inter-county
- Years: County
- Limerick
Inter-county titles
- Munster titles: 1
- All-Irelands: 1

Patrick Flynn (1867 – February 1948) was an Irish hurler who played as a right corner-forward for the Limerick senior team.

Born in Kilfinane, County Limerick, Condon first played competitive hurling in his youth. He was a regular for the Limerick senior hurling team during a successful period at the end of the 19th century. During his inter-county career he won one All-Ireland medal and one Munster medal.

At club level Flynn was a two-time championship medallist with Kilfinane.

== Honours ==
=== Player ===
Limerick

- All-Ireland Senior Hurling Championship (1): 1897
- Munster Senior Hurling Championship (1): 1897
