= Tom Allen (hurler) =

Irish hurler

Personal information
- Native name: Tomás Ó Ailín (Irish)
- Born: 4 September 1874 Littleton, County Tipperary, Ireland
- Died: 20 June 1952 (aged 77) Littleton, County Tipperary, Ireland
- Occupation: Farmer

Sport
- Sport: Hurling
- Position: Full-back
Club
- Years: Club
- Two-Mile-Borris
Club titles
- Tipperary titles: 3
Inter-county
- Years: County
- 1900-1907: Tipperary
Inter-county titles
- Munster titles: 2
- All-Irelands: 2

Thomas Allen (4 September 1874 – 20 June 1952) was an Irish hurler. His championship career with the Tipperary senior team spanned several seasons from 1900 until 1907.

Born in Littleton, County Tipperary, Allen was the third of five children born to William and Catherine Allen (née Purcell). He was educated locally before later working as a farmer.

Allen first played competitive hurling with the Two-Mile-Borris club. In a successful era for the club, he won county senior championship medals in 1900, 1903 and 1905.

Success at club level saw Allen added to the Tipperary senior team and he made his debut during the 1900 championship. He won an All-Ireland medal in his debut season before claiming a second winners' medal in 1906. Allen also won two Munster medals before retiring from inter-county hurling following the conclusion of the 1907 championship.

== Honours ==
Two-Mile-Borris

- Tipperary Senior Hurling Championship (3): 1900, 1903, 1905

Tipperary

- All-Ireland Senior Hurling Championship (2): 1900, 1906
- Munster Senior Hurling Championship (2): 1900, 1906
