= Mick Hickey (Limerick hurler) =

Irish hurler

Michael Hickey (1 December 1912 – 2 November 1992) was an Irish hurler. At club level he played for Ahane, winning several Limerick Senior Championship medals, and was full-back on the Limerick senior hurling team that won the 1940 All-Ireland Championship.
