= Jack Mockler =

Irish hurler

Personal information
- Native name: Seán Móicléir (Irish)
- Born: 1893 Thurles, County Tipperary, Ireland
- Died: 13 July 1957 (aged 63–64) Thurles, County Tipperary, Ireland
- Occupation: Pharmacist

Sport
- Sport: Hurling
Club
- Years: Club
- 1900s-1910s: Thurles Sarsfield's
Club titles
- Tipperary titles: 6
Inter-county
- Years: County
- 1906-1912: Tipperary
Inter-county titles
- Munster titles: 3
- All-Irelands: 2

Jack Mockler (1893 - 13 July 1957) was an Irish hurler who played for the Tipperary senior team.

Mockler joined the team during the 1906 championship and was a regular member of the starting fifteen until his retirement after the 1912 championship. During that time he won two All-Ireland medals and three Munster medals.

At club level Mockler won numerous county championship medals with Thurles Sarsfield's.
