= Eddie Kelly (hurler) =

Irish hurler

Personal information
- Native name: Éamonn Ó Ceallaigh (Irish)
- Born: 1939 (age 86–87) Enniscorthy, County Wexford, Ireland
- Height: 6 ft 3 in (191 cm)

Sport
- Sport: Hurling
- Position: Full-back
Club
- Years: Club
- St Aidan's Enniscorthy
Inter-county
- Years: County
- 1960-1969: Wexford
Inter-county titles
- Leinster titles: 2
- All-Irelands: 2
- NHL: 0
- All Stars: 0

Eddie Kelly (born 1939 in Enniscorthy, County Wexford, Ireland) is an Irish retired sportsperson. He played hurling with his local club St Aidan's Enniscorthy and was a member of the Wexford senior inter-county team from 1960 until 1969.
