= Martin Mockler =

Irish hurler (born 1893)

Personal information
- Native name: Máirtín Mocléir (Irish)
- Born: 1894 Two-Mile-Borris, County Tipperary, Ireland
- Died: Unknown
- Occupation: Agricultural labourer

Sport
- Sport: Hurling
- Position: Full-back
Club
- Years: Club
- Moycarkey–Borris
Club titles
- Tipperary titles: 1
Inter-county
- Years: County
- 1919-1926: Tipperary
Inter-county titles
- Munster titles: 2
- All-Irelands: 1

Martin Mockler (born 11 November 1893) was an Irish hurler who played as a full-back for the Tipperary senior team.

Mockler made his first appearance for the team during the 1919 championship and was a regular member of the starting fifteen until his retirement after the 1926 championship. During that time he won one All-Ireland medal and two Munster medals.

At club level Mockler was a one-time county championship medalist with Moycarkey–Borris.
