= 1896 All-Ireland Senior Hurling Championship =

10th series of All Ireland Senior Hurling Championship

All-Ireland champions
- Winning team: Tipperary (3rd win)
- Captain: Mikey Maher

All-Ireland Finalists
- Losing team: Dublin
- Captain: Pat Buckley

Provincial champions
- Munster: Tipperary
- Leinster: Dublin
- Ulster: Not Played
- Connacht: Not Played

Championship statistics
- All-Star Team: See here

The All-Ireland Senior Hurling Championship 1896 was the tenth series of the All-Ireland Senior Hurling Championship, Ireland's premier hurling knock-out competition. Tipperary won the championship, beating Dublin 8–14 to 0–4 in the final.

== Rule change ==
At the Gaelic Athletic Association's (GAA) annual congress it was decided to change the value of a goal. From 1892 until 1896 a goal was worth five points; however, the new change resulted in a goal being worth three points.

== Format ==
All-Ireland Championship

Final: (1 match) The two provincial representatives made up the two final teams with the winners being declared All-Ireland champions.

== Provincial championships ==
=== Leinster Senior Hurling Championship ===
Semi-final

Dublin	w.o – scr.	Offaly

23 May 1897
Final

Dublin	1–8 – 0–6	Kilkenny

Jones' Road, Dublin

An objection was made and a replay ordered.

27 February 1898
Final replay

Dublin	4–6 – 0–0	Kilkenny

=== Munster Senior Hurling Championship ===
Semi-final

Tipperary	5–1 – 0–1	Clare

Kilmallock

Semi-final

Cork	2–5 – 1–2	Limerick

Tipperary

Final

Tipperary	1-3 – 1-3	Cork

Kilmallock

Final replay

Tipperary	7–9 – 2–3	Cork

Jones's Road, Dublin

== All-Ireland Senior Hurling Championship ==
=== Final ===
27 March 1898
Final

Tipperary	8–14 – 0–4	Dublin

Jones's Road, Dublin
Attendance: c.8,000
Referee: D. Wood (Dublin)

== Championship statistics ==
=== Miscellaneous ===
- The Munster final ended in a draw for the first time ever. A replay was played for the 1891 Munster final; however, this was due to an objection rather than a draw.
- The Leinster final went to a replay as Kilkenny launched an objection against Dublin.
- Tipperary became the second team to win back-to-back All-Ireland titles following their final victory over Dublin. Mikey Maher became the first person to captain two All-Ireland-winning teams.

== Sources ==
- Corry, Eoghan, The GAA Book of Lists (Hodder Headline Ireland, 2005).
- Donegan, Des, The Complete Handbook of Gaelic Games (DBA Publications Limited, 2005).
