= Dick Doyle (Kilkenny hurler) =

Kilkenny hurler (1886–1959)

Personal information
- Native name: Risteard Ó Dúghaill (Irish)
- Born: 4 February 1886 Mooncoin, County Kilkenny, Ireland
- Died: 16 March 1959 (aged 73) Carrick-on-Suir, County Waterford, Ireland

Sport
- Sport: Hurling
- Position: Forward
Club
- Years: Club
- Mooncoin
Inter-county
Years	County	Apps (scores)
1903–1913	Kilkenny	34
Inter-county titles
- Leinster titles: 8
- All-Irelands: 7

Dick Doyle (4 February 1886 – 16 March 1959) was an Irish hurler who played for Mooncoin and at senior level for the Kilkenny county team in the 1900s. He is regarded as one of Kilkenny's greatest ever players.

== Playing career ==
=== Club ===
From a young age Doyle showed exceptional talent at the game of hurling and he quickly joined his local Mooncoin club. He won his first senior county title in 1906 and added two more in 1908 and 1913. Long after his inter-county career had ended Doyle finished off his club career by winning three consecutive county titles in 1916, 1917 and 1918.

=== Inter-county ===
Doyle's first appearance outside of Mooncoin was not for Kilkenny but for his province. He was a spectator at a Railway Shield game at Carrick-on-Suir when some of the Leinster team had failed to turn up. Although aged only 17 he was called in and began his hurling career. Doyle made his debut for Kilkenny in 1903 and won a Leinster SHC title. Cork later defeated Kilkenny in the All-Ireland SHC 'home' final. In 1904 Doyle won his second Leinster SHC medal before later winning his first All-Ireland SHC medal after a victory over Cork. The following year he won a third provincial title before adding a second All-Ireland SHC medal to his collection. In 1907 Doyle won a fourth Leinster SHC medal as well as a third All-Ireland SHC medal following yet another victory over Cork. He won his fourth All-Ireland SHC medal in 1909 following a comfortable victory over Tipperary.

In 1911 Kilkenny were named All-Ireland champions without having to play in the final, thus giving Doyle his fifth All-Ireland medal. In 1912 he captured yet another Leinster SHC title. Doyle later collected his sixth All-Ireland SHC medal. In 1913 Kilkenny completed the three-in-a-row, with Doyle collecting an eighth Leinster SHC medal and a record seventh All-Ireland SHC medal. He remains one of only a handful of Kilkenny players to have won seven All-Ireland SHC medals on the field of play. This record was later surpassed by Christy Ring of Cork and John Doyle of Tipperary.

Dick Doyle died in 1959.
