= Mick Rochford =

Irish hurler

Personal information
- Native name: Mícheál de Rosfort (Irish)
- Born: 1890 Limerick, Ireland
- Died: Unknown

Sport
- Sport: Hurling
- Position: Right corner-back
Club
- Years: Club
- Claughaun
Club titles
- Limerick titles: 4
Inter-county
- Years: County
- Limerick
Inter-county titles
- Munster titles: 1
- All-Irelands: 1

Michael Rochford (born 1890) was an Irish hurler who played as a right corner-back for the Limerick senior team.

Born in Limerick, Rochford first played competitive hurling in his youth. He made his first impression on the inter-county scene when he joined the Limerick senior team during a golden age between 1918 and 1923. Rochford went on to play a key role for Limerick for a brief period, and won one All-Ireland medal and one Munster medal.

At club level he was a four-time championship medallist with Claughaun.

== Honours ==
=== Player ===
Claughaun

- Limerick Senior Club Hurling Championship (4): 1914, 1915, 1916, 1918

Limerick

- All-Ireland Senior Hurling Championship (1): 1918
- Munster Senior Hurling Championship (1): 1918
