= Tommy Daly =

Irish hurler

Personal information
- Native name: Tomás Ó Dálaigh (Irish)
- Born: 15 September 1894 Tulla, County Clare, Ireland
- Died: 21 September 1936 (aged 42) Tuamgraney, County Clare, Ireland
- Occupation: Medical doctor

Sport
- Sport: Hurling
- Position: Goalkeeper
Clubs
- Years: Club
- Collegians; Tulla
Club titles
- Dublin titles: 3
College
- Years: College
- 1914-1927: University College Dublin
College titles
- Fitzgibbon titles: 6
Inter-county
- Years: County
- 1917-1927 1930-1933: Dublin; Clare
Inter-county titles
- Munster titles: 1
- Leinster titles: 5
- All-Irelands: 4
- NHL: 0

Thomas Daly (15 September 1894 – 21 September 1936) was an Irish sportsperson. He played hurling at various times with his local clubs Tulla in Clare and Collegians in Dublin. Daly also played hurling at inter-county level with both Clare and Dublin between 1917 and 1933. The GAA pitch in his native Tulla is called Dr Daly Park in his honour.

== Biography ==
Tommy Daly was born in Tulla, County Clare in 1894. He was educated locally and later attended University College Dublin where he studied medicine. It was at UCD that Daly first tasted success on the hurling field. He was the goalkeeper on the college team that captured the Fitzgibbon Cup title in 1915. Daly won a further five Fitzgibbon Cup titles with the college in 1916, 1917, 1923, 1924 and 1927. After graduation, he practiced medicine in London and regularly returned home for hurling matches.

Tommy Daly died in a car accident in Tuamgraney in 1936.

== Playing career ==
=== Club ===
Daly played his club hurling with his local club in Tulla. After moving to Dublin he joined the local hurling club in UCD. It was with the 'Collegians' that he enjoyed great success as he won three senior county titles in-a-row in 1917, 1918 and 1919. Daly returned to his own native club of Tulla in the early 1930s and captured a county title with that club in 1933.

=== Inter-county ===
Daly first came to prominence on the inter-county scene as a member of the Clare junior hurling team. He won a Munster title with that team in 1914. In that same year he collected an All-Ireland medal in that grade as Clare won their first Junior All-Ireland by defeating Laois on a score of 2-02 to 0-0.

After moving to UCD Daly became the regular goalkeeper on the Dublin hurling team. He captured his first Leinster title in 1917 following a victory over Kilkenny. The subsequent All-Ireland final pitted 'the Dubs' against Tipperary. Daly's team had come from nowhere and took on one of the giants of the championship. A 5–4 to 4–2 victory gave Dublin the victory and gave Daly his first All-Ireland medal.

Dublin surrendered their provincial crown in 1918, however, Kilkenny fell to 'the Dubs' again in 1919 giving Daly his second Leinster medal. Cork provided the opposition on that occasion; however, the Munster champions emerged victorious by 6–4 to 2–4.

Dublin retained their provincial title in 1920, however, Daly played no part in the Leinster final. He returned to his goalkeeping berth for the subsequent All-Ireland final. The game was a replay of the previous year's encounter as Cork provided the opposition once again. Cork looked to be heading for victory, however, a four-goal blitz by Dublin sealed the 4–9 to 4–3 victory and gave Daly a second All-Ireland medal.

1921 saw Daly add a third Leinster memento to his collection before lining out in yet another All-Ireland final. Limerick were the opponents on that occasion, however, the game was not a memorable one for Daly. The score line of 8–5 to 3-2 resulted in a comprehensive victory for Limerick.

Dublin surrendered their provincial crown for the next two years, however, Daly collected a fourth Leinster title in 1924 as Offaly fell in the deciding game. The All-Ireland championship decider pitted Dublin against Galway and an exciting game unfolded. Galway, the reigning champions, took the lead, however, 'the Dubs' fought back and won the game by 5–3 to 2–6. Daly had captured his third All-Ireland title and Frank Wall, the Dublin captain, became the only man to accept the Liam MacCarthy Cup without having played in the final.

It would be 1927 before Daly won his fifth and final Leinster title. The All-Ireland final saw 'the Dubs' take on Cork once again. Cork, as reigning champions, were the favourites, however, a Dublin team that consisted of nine members of the Garda Síochána put up a strong defence. They led at half-time and held the lead until the end giving Daly his fourth All-Ireland medal.

In 1928 the rule preventing non-residents from playing with their native county was amended. Two years later in 1930 Daly was practicing medicine in London when he signed a non-residents declaration enabling him to play with Clare. That year he lined out in the Munster Championship and even played in the provincial final. Tipperary were the victors on that occasion. Two years later in 1933 Daly was between the posts as Clare defeated Cork, giving him a Munster medal to his already impressive collection of hurling mementos. The subsequent All-Ireland final saw Clare line out against Kilkenny. In a low-scoring but exciting game 'the Cats' emerged victorious on a score line of 3–3 to 2–3. This defeat brought the curtain down on Daly's inter-county career.

=== Provincial ===
Daly also lined out with both Leinster and Munster in the inter-provincial hurling competition. He captured his first Railway Cup medal with Leinster in 1927 in the inaugural year of the competition. In 1934 Daly was the goalkeeper on the Munster side as he collected a second Railway Cup title.

== Post-playing career ==
In retirement from playing Daly retained a keen interest in the game. Shortly after his retirement he became a referee of games. In 1935 he took charge of the All-Ireland hurling final between Kilkenny and Limerick.

Achievements
Preceded by Stephen Jordan	All-Ireland Senior Hurling Final referee 1935	Succeeded by Jim O'Regan
