= 1898 All-Ireland Senior Hurling Championship =

All-Ireland champions
- Winning team: Tipperary (4th win)
- Captain: Mikey Maher

All-Ireland Finalists
- Losing team: Kilkenny
- Captain: Ned Hennessy

Provincial champions
- Munster: Tipperary
- Leinster: Kilkenny
- Ulster: Not Played
- Connacht: Not Played

Championship statistics
- All-Star Team: See here

The All-Ireland Senior Hurling Championship 1898 was the 12th series of the All-Ireland Senior Hurling Championship, Ireland's premier hurling knock-out competition. Tipperary won the championship, beating Kilkenny 7–13 to 3–10 in the final.

== Format ==
All-Ireland Championship

Semi-final: (1 match) This is a lone game which sees the winners of the Munster championship play Galway who receive a bye to this stage. One team is eliminated while the winning team advances to the final.

Final: (1 match) The winners of the lone semi-final play the winners of the Munster championship.

== Provincial championships ==
=== Leinster Senior Hurling Championship ===
Quarter-final

Wexford	0–0 – 1–11	Offaly

Jones's Road, Dublin

Semi-final

Kilkenny	4–13 – 1–5	Offaly

Jones's Road, Dublin

28 January 1900
Final

Kilkenny	4–12 – 3–2	Dublin

Jones's Road, Dublin

=== Munster Senior Hurling Championship ===
Semi-final

Cork	6–6 – 0–2	Limerick

Tipperary

Semi-final

Tipperary	w.o – scr.	Clare

Walsh Park, Waterford

Final

Tipperary	3–0 – 2–3	Cork

Fraher Field, Dungarvan

Final replay

Tipperary	1–13 – 1–2	Cork

Kilmallock

== All-Ireland Senior Hurling Championship ==
=== All-Ireland Semi-finals ===
25 March 1900
Semi-final

Galway	1–3 – 3–14	Tipperary

Athenry

=== All-Ireland Final ===
25 March 1900
Final

Tipperary	7–13 – 3–10	Kilkenny

Jones's Road, Dublin
Attendance: c.2,500
Referee: J.J. McCabe (Dublin)

== Championship statistics ==
=== Miscellaneous ===
- The Munster final between Cork and Tipperary had to be abandoned due to fading light. Both sides were level at the time and a replay later took place.
- Mikey Maher of Tipperary became the first player to captain a team to three All-Ireland final victories.

== Sources ==
- Corry, Eoghan, The GAA Book of Lists (Hodder Headline Ireland, 2005).
- Donegan, Des, The Complete Handbook of Gaelic Games (DBA Publications Limited, 2005).
