= Leonard McGrath =

Irish Gaelic footballer and hurler

Personal information
- Native name: Lionard Mac Craith (Irish)
- Born: 1898 Charters Towers, Queensland, Australia
- Occupation: Farmer

Sport
- Football Position: Right wing-forward
- Hurling Position: Right corner-forward
Clubs
- Years: Club
- Mullagh; St Grellan's
Inter-county
- Years: County
- Galway
Inter-county titles
	Football	Hurling
All-Ireland Titles	1	1

Leonard John McGrath (27 September 1897 – 2 December 1948) was an Irish dual player who played both football and hurling for Galway.

Born in Charters Towers, Queensland, Australia, McGrath came to Galway with his family in his youth. He made his first impression on the inter-county scene when he was a member of the Galway senior hurling team for the 1923 championship. McGrath won an All-Ireland medal that year as Galway secured their first hurling title. Two years later he won an All-Ireland medal with the Galway senior football team.

At club level McGrath played with Mullagh and St Grellan's.

He also played rugby, which earned him an expulsion from the GAA under Rule 27.

His medal collection was auctioned in 2020.
