= 1922 All-Ireland Senior Hurling Championship =

Championship details
- Teams: 12

All-Ireland champions
- Winning team: Kilkenny (8th win)
- Captain: Wattie Dunphy

All-Ireland Finalists
- Losing team: Tipperary
- Captain: Johnny Leahy

Provincial champions
- Munster: Tipperary
- Leinster: Kilkenny
- Ulster: Not Played
- Connacht: Galway

Championship statistics
- No. matches played: 11
- Goals total: 74 (6.7 per game)
- Points total: 73 (6.6 per game)
- All-Star Team: See here

The 1922 All-Ireland Senior Hurling Championship was the 36th staging of the All-Ireland Senior Hurling Championship, the Gaelic Athletic Association's premier inter-county hurling tournament. The championship began in May 1922 and ended on 9 September 1923.

The championship was won by Kilkenny who secured the title following a 4–2 to 2–6 defeat of Tipperary in the All-Ireland final. This was their 8th All-Ireland title, their first in nine championship seasons.

Limerick were the defending champions but were defeated by Tipperary in the Munster final

== Provincial Championships ==
=== Connacht Senior Hurling Championship ===
Final	Galway	12–8 – 1–0	Roscommon	Ballygar

=== Leinster Senior Hurling Championship ===
9 April 1922 Semi-final	Kilkenny	5–5 – 1–2	Laois	O'Moore Park, Portlaoise

28 May 1922 Semi-final	Dublin	4–5 – 3–3	Offaly	Ballybrophy Sportsfield

19 November 1922 Final	Kilkenny	3–4 – 1–2	Dublin	Croke Park

=== Munster Senior Hurling Championship ===
22 April 1923 Quarter-final	Cork	6–8 – 0–2	Clare	Markets Field

29 April 1923 Quarter-final	Tipperary	w/o – scr.	Waterford

20 May 1923 Semi-final	Cork	3–2 – 6–2	Tipperary	Cork Athletic Grounds
				Referee: T Hayes (Limerick)

Semi-final	Limerick	8–5 – 2–2	Kerry

1 July 1923 Final	Tipperary	2–2 – 2–2	Limerick	Thurles Sportsfield
				Referee: P O'Keeffe (Cork)

12 August 1923 Final replay	Limerick	1–4 – 4–2	Tipperary	Markets Field

== All-Ireland Senior Hurling Championship ==
=== All-Ireland semi-final ===
26 August 1923 Semi-final	Galway	1–3 – 3–2	Tipperary	Galway Sportsfield

=== All-Ireland Final ===
9 September 1923 Final	Kilkenny	4–2 – 2–6	Tipperary	Croke Park
				Referee: P Dunphy (Laois)

== Championship statistics ==
=== Miscellaneous ===
- Kilkenny win their 8th championship and overtake Cork in second position on the all time roll of honour.

== Sources ==
- Corry, Eoghan, The GAA Book of Lists (Hodder Headline Ireland, 2005).
- Donegan, Des, The Complete Handbook of Gaelic Games (DBA Publications Limited, 2005).
