= List of Cork senior hurling team captains =

This article lists players who have captained the senior Cork county hurling team in the Munster Senior Hurling Championship and the All-Ireland Senior Hurling Championship. The captain was usually chosen from the club that won the Cork Senior Hurling Championship; however, as of 2008, the captain has been appointed by the manager.

== List of captains ==
=== 1888–1899 ===
Year	Player	Club	National	Provincial
1888	William Gleeson	Tower St.		
1889	William Ryan	Inniscarra		
1890	Dan Lane	Aghabullogue	All-Ireland Hurling Final winning captain	Munster Hurling Final winning captain
1891	Denis Scannell	Blackrock		
1892	Bill O'Callaghan	Redmond's	All-Ireland Hurling Final winning captain	Munster Hurling Final winning captain
1893	John Murphy	Blackrock	All-Ireland Hurling Final winning captain	Munster Hurling Final winning captain
1894	Stephen Hayes	Blackrock	All-Ireland Hurling Final winning captain	Munster Hurling Final winning captain
1895	Cork did not participate in the championship in protest at Dublin being awarded the 1894 All-Ireland football title			
1896	Richard Mooney	Ballyhea		
1897	Pat Coughlan	Blackrock		
1898	Denis Cremin	Blackrock		
1899	Jim Young	St. Finbarr's		

=== 1900–1909 ===
Year	Player	Club	National	Provincial
1900	Tom Irwin	Redmond's		
1901	Jack Leonard	Redmond's		
	Paddy Cantillon	Redmond's		Munster Hurling Final winning captain
1902	Jamesy Kelleher	Dungourney	All-Ireland Hurling Final winning captain	Munster Hurling Final winning captain
1903	Dan Coughlan	Blackrock		
	Steva Riordan	Blackrock		
	Dan Coughlan	Blackrock		Munster Hurling Final winning captain
	Steva Riordan	Blackrock	All-Ireland Hurling Final winning captain	
1904	Dan Harrington	St. Finbarr's		Munster Hurling Final winning captain
1905	Denis O'Keeffe	Redmond's		
	Dan Harrington	St. Finbarr's		Munster Hurling Final winning captain
	Steva Riordan	Blackrock		
	Jamesy Kelleher	Dungourney		
	Christy Young	St. Finbarr's		
1906	Christy Young	St. Finbarr's		
1907	Jamesy Kelleher	Dungourney		Munster Hurling Final winning captain
1908	J. McCullagh	C.Y.M.S.		
	Tom Coughlan	Blackrock		
1909	Jamesy Kelleher	Dungourney		

=== 1910–1919 ===
Year	Player	Club	National	Provincial
1910	Tom Coughlan	Blackrock		
1911	Tom Coughlan	Blackrock		
1912	Andy Buckley	Blackrock		
	Barry Murphy	Blackrock		Munster Hurling Final winning captain
1913	Barry Murphy	Blackrock		
1914	Barry Murphy	Blackrock		
1915	Connie Sheehan	Redmond's		Munster Hurling Final winning captain
1916	Connie Sheehan	Redmond's		
1917				
1918				
1919	T. O'Leary	Carrigtwohill		
	Jimmy Kennedy	Carrigtwohill	All-Ireland Hurling Final winning captain	Munster Hurling Final winning captain

=== 1920–1929 ===
Year	Player	Club	National	Provincial
1920	Dick O'Gorman	Midleton		Munster Hurling Final winning captain
1921				
1922	John Dorney	St. Finbarr's		
	Dannix Ring	St. Finbarr's		
1923	Dannix Ring	St. Finbarr's		
1924	Dannix Ring	St. Finbarr's		
1925				
1926	Seán Óg Murphy	Blackrock	All-Ireland Hurling Final winning captain	Munster Hurling Final winning captain
1927	Seán Óg Murphy	Blackrock		Munster Hurling Final winning captain
1928	Seán Óg Murphy	Blackrock	All-Ireland Hurling Final winning captain	Munster Hurling Final winning captain
1929	Dinny Barry-Murphy	Éire Óg	All-Ireland Hurling Final winning captain	Munster Hurling Final winning captain

=== 1930–1939 ===
Year	Player	Club	National	Provincial
1930	Eudie Coughlan	Blackrock		
1931	Eudie Coughlan	Blackrock	All-Ireland Hurling Final winning captain	Munster Hurling Final winning captain
1932	Edward O'Connell	Blackrock		
1933				
1934	John Kenneally	St. Finbarr's		
1935	Paddy Collins	Glen Rovers		
1936	Paddy Collins	Glen Rovers		
1937	Paddy Collins	Glen Rovers		
1938	Jack Lynch	Glen Rovers		
1939	Jack Lynch	Glen Rovers		Munster Hurling Final winning captain

=== 1940–1949 ===
Year	Player	Club	National	Provincial
1940	Jack Lynch	Glen Rovers		
1941	Connie Buckley	Glen Rovers	All-Ireland Hurling Final winning captain	
1942	Jack Lynch	Glen Rovers	All-Ireland Hurling Final winning captain	Munster Hurling Final winning captain
1943	Mick Kennefick	St. Finbarr's	All-Ireland Hurling Final winning captain	Munster Hurling Final winning captain
1944	Seán Condon	St. Finbarr's	All-Ireland Hurling Final winning captain	Munster Hurling Final winning captain
1945	Seán Condon	St. Finbarr's		
1946	Christy Ring	Glen Rovers	All-Ireland Hurling Final winning captain	Munster Hurling Final winning captain
1947	Seán Condon	St. Finbarr's		Munster Hurling Final winning captain
1948	Tom Mulcahy	St. Finbarr's		
1949	Jim Young	Glen Rovers		

=== 1950–1959 ===
Year	Player	Club	National	Provincial
1950	Christy Ring	Glen Rovers		
1951	John Lyons	Glen Rovers		
1952	Paddy Barry	Sarsfield's	All-Ireland Hurling Final winning captain	Munster Hurling Final winning captain
1953	Christy Ring	Glen Rovers	All-Ireland Hurling Final winning captain	Munster Hurling Final winning captain
1954	Christy Ring	Glen Rovers	All-Ireland Hurling Final winning captain	Munster Hurling Final winning captain
1955	Vincy Twomey	Glen Rovers		
1956	Tony O'Shaughnessy	St. Fnbarr's		
	Christy Ring	Glen Rovers		Munster Hurling Final winning captain
	Tony O'Shaughnessy	St. Finbarr's		
1957	Mick Cashman	Blackrock		
1958	Paddy Barry	Sarsfield's		
1959	Jimmy Brohan	Blackrock		

=== 1960–1969 ===
Year	Player	Club	National	Provincial
1960	Joe Twomey	Glen Rovers		
1961	Christy Ring	Glen Rovers		
1962	Mick Cashman	Blackrock		
1963	Mick McCarthy	Glen Rovers		
1964	John O'Halloran	Blackrock		
1965	Denis O'Riordan	Glen Rovers		
1966	Peter Doolan	St. Finbarr's		
	Gerald McCarthy	St. Finbarr's	All-Ireland Hurling Final winning captain	Munster Hurling Final winning captain
1967	Jack Russell	Ballyhea		
1968	Jerry O'Sullivan	Glen Rovers		
1969	Denis Murphy	St. Finbarr's		Munster Hurling Final winning captain

=== 1970–1979 ===
Year	Player	Club	National	Provincial
1970	Paddy Barry	St. Vincent's	All-Ireland Hurling Final winning captain	Munster Hurling Final winning captain
1971	Pat McDonnell	Inniscarra		
1972	Frank Norberg	Blackrock		Munster Hurling Final winning captain
1973	Denis Coughlan	Glen Rovers		
1974	John Horgan	Blackrock		
1975	Gerald McCarthy	St. Finbarr's		Munster Hurling Final winning captain
1976	Ray Cummins	Blackrock	All-Ireland Hurling Final winning captain	Munster Hurling Final winning captain
1977	Denis Coughlan	Glen Rovers		
	Martin O'Doherty	Glen Rovers	All-Ireland Hurling Final winning captain	Munster Hurling Final winning captain
1978	Charlie McCarthy	St. Finbarr's	All-Ireland Hurling Final winning captain	Munster Hurling Final winning captain
1979	John Horgan	Blackrock		Munster Hurling Final winning captain

=== 1980–1989 ===
Year	Player	Club	National	Provincial
1980	Dermot McCurtain	Blackrock		
1981	Dónal O'Grady	St. Finbarr's		
1982	Jimmy Barry-Murphy	St. Finbarr's		Munster Hurling Final winning captain
1983	Jimmy Barry-Murphy	St. Finbarr's		Munster Hurling Final winning captain
1984	John Fenton	Midleton	All-Ireland Hurling Final winning captain	Munster Hurling Final winning captain
1985	Ger Cunningham	St. Finbarr's		Munster Hurling Final winning captain
1986	Tom Cashman	Blackrock	All-Ireland Hurling Final winning captain	Munster Hurling Final winning captain
1987	Kevin Hennessy	Midleton		
1988	Denis Mulcahy	Midleton		
1989	Ger Cunningham	St. Finbarr's		

=== 1990–1999 ===
Year	Player	Club	National	Provincial
1990	Kieran McGuckin	Glen Rovers		Munster Hurling Final winning captain
	Tomás Mulcahy	Glen Rovers	All-Ireland Hurling Final winning captain	
1991	Tony O'Sullivan	Na Piarsaigh		
1992	Ger FitzGerald	Midleton		Munster Hurling Final winning captain
1993	Brian Corcoran	Erin's Own		
1994	Ger Cunningham	St. Finbarr's		
1995	Pat Kenneally	Newcestown		
1996	Mark Mullins	Na Piarsaigh		
1997	Fergal McCormack	Mallow		
1998	Diarmuid O'Sullivan	Cloyne		
1999	Mark Landers	Killeagh	All-Ireland Hurling Final winning captain	Munster Hurling Final winning captain

=== 2000–2009 ===
Year	Player	Club	National	Provincial
2000	Fergal Ryan	Blackrock		Munster Hurling Final winning captain
2001	Ben O'Connor	Newtownshandrum		
2002	Wayne Sherlock	Blackrock		
2003	Alan Browne	Blackrock		Munster Hurling Final winning captain
2004	Ben O'Connor	Newtownshandrum	All-Ireland Hurling Final winning captain	
2005	Seán Óg Ó hAilpín	Na Piarsaigh	All-Ireland Hurling Final winning captain	Munster Hurling Final winning captain
2006	Pat Mulcahy	Newtownshandrum		Munster Hurling Final winning captain
2007	Kieran Murphy	Erin's Own		
	Joe Deane	Killeagh		
2008	John Gardiner	Na Piarsaigh		
2009	John Gardiner	Na Piarsaigh		

=== 2010–present ===
Year	Captain	Club	Vice-captain	Club	National	Provincial
2010	Kieran Murphy	Sarsfield's	Shane O'Neill	Bishopstown		
2011	Shane O'Neill	Bishopstown	Eoin Cadogan	Douglas		
2012	Patrick Horgan	Glen Rovers				
2013	Brian Murphy	Bride Rovers				
2014	Patrick Cronin	Bishopstown				Munster Hurling Final winning captain
2015	Anthony Nash	Kanturk				
2016	Stephen McDonnell	Glen Rovers				
2017	Stephen McDonnell	Glen Rovers				Munster Hurling Final winning captain
2018	Séamus Harnedy	St. Ita's				Munster Hurling Final winning captain
2019	Séamus Harnedy	St. Ita's				
2020	Patrick Horgan	Glen Rovers				
2021	Patrick Horgan	Glen Rovers				
2022	Mark Coleman	Blarney	Seán O'Donoghue	Inniscarra		
2023	Seán O'Donoghue	Inniscarra				
2024	Seán O'Donoghue	Inniscarra				
2025	Robert Downey	Glen Rovers	Shane Barrett	Blarney		Munster Hurling Final winning captain
2026	Darragh Fitzgibbon	Charleville	Mark Coleman	Blarney		
