= Paddy Cantillon =

Irish hurler

Personal information
- Native name: Pádraig Cantalún (Irish)
- Born: 11 December 1874 Ballinlough, Cork, Ireland
- Died: 25 March 1924 (aged 49) Sunday's Well, Cork, Ireland
- Occupation: Labourer

Sport
- Sport: Hurling
- Position: Right corner-back
Club
- Years: Club
- Redmonds
Club titles
- Cork titles: 2
Inter-county
- Years: County
- 1901-1902: Cork
Inter-county titles
- Munster titles: 2
- All-Irelands: 0

Patrick Cantillon (11 December 1874 – 25 March 1924) was an Irish hurler who played with club side Redmonds and at inter-county level with the Cork senior hurling team.

== Playing career ==
Born in Ballinlough, Cork, Cantillon first played hurling as a member of the Redmonds club. He was a member of the club's senior team when they won back-to-back County Senior Championships in 1900 and 1901. These victories earned Cantillon a call-up to the Cork senior hurling team for the 1901 Munster Championship. He took over the captaincy of the team midway through the championship and won a Munster Championship medal after a win over Clare. Cantillon later captained Cork to a defeat by London in the 1901 All-Ireland final. He won a second successive Munster Championship medal in 1902, but was not included on the team for their subsequent success in the 1902 All-Ireland final.

== Honours ==
Redmonds

- Cork Senior Hurling Championship (2): 1900, 1901

Cork

- Munster Senior Hurling Championship (2): 1901, 1902

Sporting positions
Preceded by Jack Leonard	Cork Senior Hurling Captain; 1901	Succeeded by Jamesy Kelleher
