= Dave McGrath =

Irish hurler

Personal information
- Native name: Daithí Mac Craith (Irish)
- Nickname: Daw
- Born: 20 November 1875 Douglas, Cork, Ireland
- Died: 20 May 1940 (aged 64) Cork District Hospital, Cork, Ireland
- Occupation: Labourer

Sport
- Sport: Hurling
- Position: Forward
Club
- Years: Club
- Redmonds
Club titles
- Cork titles: 2
Inter-county
- Years: County
- 1900–1906: Cork
Inter-county titles
- Munster titles: 5
- All-Irelands: 2

David McGrath (20 November 1875 – 20 May 1940) was an Irish hurler who played for Cork Senior Championship club Redmonds. He was a member of the Cork senior hurling team for seven seasons, during which time he usually lined out as a forward.

== Honours ==
Redmonds

- Cork Senior Hurling Championship: 1900, 1901

Cork

- All-Ireland Senior Hurling Championship: 1902, 1903
- Munster Senior Hurling Championship: 1901, 1902, 1903, 1904, 1905

== Sources ==
- Corry, Eoghan, The GAA Book of Lists (Hodder Headline Ireland, 2005).
- Cronin, Jim, A Rebel Hundred: Cork's 100 All-Ireland Titles.
- Donegan, Des, The Complete Handbook of Gaelic Games (DBA Publications Limited, 2005).
