= Jack Leonard (hurler) =

Irish hurler

Personal information
- Native name: Seán Ó Loinín (Irish)
- Born: 15 November 1873 Ballyphehane, Cork, Ireland
- Died: 21 March 1938 (aged 64) Ballyphehane, Cork, Ireland
- Occupation: Labourer

Sport
- Sport: Hurling
- Position: Midfield
Club
- Years: Club
- Redmonds
Club titles
- Cork titles: 2
Inter-county
- Years: County
- 1901: Cork
Inter-county titles
- Munster titles: 1
- All-Irelands: 0

John Leonard (15 November 1873 – 21 March 1938) was an Irish hurler who played with club side Redmonds and at inter-county level with the Cork senior hurling team.

== Playing career ==
Born in Ballyphehane, Cork, Leonard first played hurling as a member of the Redmonds club. He was a member of the club's senior team when they won back-to-back County Senior Championships in 1900 and 1901. These victories earned Leonard a call-up to the Cork senior hurling team for the 1901 Munster Championship. After being appointed captaincy of the team, he was replaced midway through the championship but won a Munster Championship medal after a win over Clare. Leonard later lined out in Cork's defeat by London in the 1901 All-Ireland final.

== Honours ==
Redmonds

- Cork Senior Hurling Championship (2): 1900, 1901

Cork

- Munster Senior Hurling Championship (1): 1901

Sporting positions
Preceded by Tom Irwin	Cork Senior Hurling Captain; 1901	Succeeded by Paddy Cantillon
