= Jim Buttimer =

Irish hurler (1909–1962)

Personal information
- Native name: Séamus Buitiméar (Irish)
- Born: 1909 Cork, Ireland
- Died: 7 August 1962 (aged 53) Cork, Ireland
- Occupation: Milk vendor
- Height: 5 ft 7 in (170 cm)

Sport
- Sport: Hurling
- Position: Goalkeeper
Club
- Years: Club
- 1930-1942: St Finbarr's
Club titles
- Cork titles: 3
Inter-county
Years	County	Apps (scores)
1933-1942	Cork	16 (0-00)
Inter-county titles
- Munster titles: 1
- All-Irelands: 2
- NHL: 2

James Buttimer (1909 – 7 August 1962) was an Irish hurler and selector. At club level he played with St Finbarr's and played at senior level for the Cork county team. Buttimer usually lined out as a goalkeeper.

== Playing career ==
=== Club ===
Born in Cork, Buttimer first played hurling at juvenile and underage levels with St Finbarr's. He joined the club's senior team as first-choice goalkeeper in 1930. Within three years of joining the team, Buttimer had secured two Cork SHC medals as St Finbarr's beat Carrigtwohill in consecutive finals in 1932 and 1933 before losing to Glen Rovers in the 1934 final. After almost a decade without a St Finbarr's appearance in a final, he won a third winners' medal after a defeat of Ballincollig in the 1942 final.

=== Inter-county ===
Buttimer's performances at club level with St Finbarr's resulted in a call-up to the Cork senior hurling team. He was sub-goalkeeper for Cork's unsuccessful 1933 Munster SHC campaign before breaking onto the starting fifteen as first-choice goalkeeper for the 1935 Munster SHC first round defeat of Tipperary. Buttimer was dropped from the team for Cork's next championship game and remained off the panel until a recall in 1937. He claimed his first silverware when Cork beat Limerick in the 1939 Munster final, however, Cork's season ended with a defeat by Kilkenny in the 1939 All-Ireland final.

Buttimer claimed his first national silverware when Cork secured consecutive National League titles in 1940 and 1941. At the end of the latter season he won his first All-Ireland medal after lining out in goal in the defeat of Dublin in the 1941 All-Ireland final. Buttimer was dropped as first-choice goalkeeper in favour of Ned Porter in 1942, however, he did come on as a substitute in Cork's opening round defeat of Limerick. He was once again introduced as a substitute for Porter in the defeat of Dublin in the 1942 All-Ireland final.

== Management career ==
In retirement from playing, Buttimer remained heavily involved in a coaching role with the St Finbarr's club. He was one of two St Finbarr's nominees to the selection committee of the Cork senior hurling team in January 1947. Buttimer's season with the team yielded a fifth Munster Championship title in six seasons; however, Cork's season ended with a one-point defeat by Kilkenny in the 1947 All-Ireland final.

== Death ==
Buttimer died at St. Finbarr's Hospital in Cork on 7 August 1962, aged 53.

== Honours ==
St Finbarr's

- Cork Senior Hurling Championship: 1932, 1933, 1942

Cork

- All-Ireland Senior Hurling Championship: 1941, 1942
- Munster Senior Hurling Championship: 1939, 1942
- National Hurling League: 1939-40, 1940-41
