= Billy Stanton =

Irish hurler

Personal information
- Native name: Liam Standún (Irish)
- Nickname: Billy
- Born: 20 January 1904 Blackpool, Cork, Ireland
- Died: 3 January 1995 (aged 90) Farranree, Cork, Ireland
- Occupation: Cork Corporation employee

Sport
- Sport: Hurling
- Position: Right corner-forward
Club
- Years: Club
- 1928-1937: St Finbarr's
Club titles
- Cork titles: 2
Inter-county*
Years	County	Apps (scores)
1929-1933	Cork	2 (0-00)
Inter-county titles
- Munster titles: 2
- All-Irelands: 2
- NHL: 1
- *Inter County team apps and scores correct as of 00:23, 8 August 2013.

William Francis Stanton (20 January 1904 – 3 January 1995) was an Irish hurler. At club level he played with St Finbarr's and was also a member of the Cork senior hurling team.

== Career ==
Stanton first played hurling with St Finbarr's after joining the club's senior team in 1927. His performances at club level soon earned a call-up to the Cork senior hurling team and he was a substitute on the team that beat Galway in the 1929 All-Ireland final. Stanton won a National League medal in 1930 before later winning a second All-Ireland medal after a three-game saga with Kilkenny in the 1931 All-Ireland final. He continued being selected for Cork until 1933. Stanton won two Cork SHC medals as St Finbarr's beat Carrigtwohill in consecutive finals in 1932 and 1933 before losing to Glen Rovers in the 1934 final.

== Personal life and death ==
William Francis Stanton was born in January 1904 at Sunday School Lane in the Blackpool area of Cork. The third of ten children born to Denis and Mary Stanton (née Foley), he later worked with Cork Corporation. Stanton married Kitty Moore on 20 November 1926 and had eight children. He died at Cork University Hospital on 3 January 1995, aged 90.

== Honours ==
St Finbarr's

- Cork Senior Hurling Championship: 1932, 1933

Cork

- All-Ireland Senior Hurling Championship: 1929, 1931
- Munster Senior Hurling Championship: 1929, 1931
- National Hurling League: 1929-30
