= Tim Hallihan =

Irish hurler

Personal information
- Native name: Tadhg Ó hAileacháin (Irish)
- Born: 7 July 1876 Ballincollig, Cork, Ireland
- Died: 12 November 1955 (aged 79) Harold's Cross, Dublin, Ireland
- Occupation: Engine fitter

Sport
- Sport: Hurling
- Position: Full-forward
Club
- Years: Club
- Ballincollig
Club titles
- Cork titles: 0
Inter-county
- Years: County
- 1901-1905: Cork
Inter-county titles
- Munster titles: 2
- All-Irelands: 0

Timothy J. Hallihan (7 July 1876 – 12 November 1955) was an Irish hurler who played with club side Ballincollig and at inter-county level with the Cork senior hurling team.

== Playing career ==
Born in Ballincollig, Hallihan first played hurling as a member of the local club. His prowess at club level earned a call-up to the Cork senior hurling team for the 1901 Munster Championship and collected a winners' medal after victory over Clare. Hallihan later lined out when Cork suffered a defeat by London in the 1901 All-Ireland final. He won a second successive Munster Championship medal in 1902, but was not included on the team for their subsequent success in the 1902 All-Ireland final. Hallihan was recalled to the team for a brief appearance in the first round of the 1905 Munster Championship.

== Honours ==
Cork

- Munster Senior Hurling Championship (2): 1901, 1902
