= 1892 All-Ireland Senior Hurling Championship final =

1892 All-Ireland Senior Hurling Final
- Event: 1892 All-Ireland Senior Hurling Championship
Cork	Dublin
2-3	1-5
- Date: 26 March 1893
- Venue: Clonturk Park, Dublin
- Referee: Dan Fraher (Waterford)
- Attendance: 5,000

The 1892 All-Ireland Senior Hurling Championship Final was the 5th All-Ireland Final and the culmination of the 1892 All-Ireland Senior Hurling Championship, an inter-county hurling tournament for the top teams in Ireland. The match was held at Clonturk Park, Dublin on 26 March 1893 between Cork, represented by club side Redmonds, and Dublin, represented by club side Faughs-Davitts. Cork led by 2–3 to 1-5 when the Dublin side left the field in protest at a disputed goal. Cork were awarded the title.

== Match details ==
26 March 1893

Cork	2-3 – 1-5 Unfinished	Dublin

Clonturk Park, Dublin
Attendance: 5,000
Referee: Dan Fraher (Waterford)

Cork Team Billy O'Callaghan, Mickey Sheehan, John Cashman, Michael Casserly, Tom Irwin, William O'Connor, John O'Connor, Con O'Callaghan, Pat Coughlan, Denis Scannell, Miah Norberg, P Murphy, James Keegan, James Conway, Dan Drew, J Buckley, Denis Halloran

=== Match report ===
Glorious spring sunshine greeted both sets of players on their arrival on the field. It was late afternoon when referee Dan Fraher of Waterford threw in the sliothar and got the game going. At half-time Cork were in front by 0–4 to 0-0, but it was in the second half that the game developed into a thriller. Stylish play by Cork captain Bill O'Callaghan, who was striking top form in midfield, spraying passes to his men on the wings and foraging deeply into the Dublin area, eventually brought a vital goal and

The excitement was too much for a 32-year-old Dubliner named John Nevin, who collapsed and died on the sideline during the second half. Play continued with both teams hurling furiously to notch the decisive goal.

Dublin, with the wind and sun behind them, pressed forward towards the Drumcondra end of the field, where the Cork defenders held out. Then a long, relieving clearance by Kenneally sent Redmonds into the attack once again and led to a frantic scrimmage in the Dublin goalmouth. The ball eventually crossed the goal-line but the Dublin backs objected strongly, claiming that it had gone over the point-line first. There was a heated argument in the goalmouth before Dan Fraher made up his mind and awarded a goal to Cork.

The Dublin players threatened to walk off the pitch, and spectators, referee and umpires were soon involved in an argument. In a bid to avoid the game being abandoned, the referee then reversed his decision, saying "All right, I won't allow the goal. Let the Central Council decide. Now come on lads, it's getting late. We must finish the match." But it was too late. Several Dublin players had already left the ground and some had actually gone to work where they were due at 1:30pm. The referee had no choice but to abandon the game.

Because Dublin players withdrew the Central Council of the GAA later awarded the title to Cork.
