= Tom Barry (London hurler) =

Irish hurler and Gaelic footballer

Personal information
- Native name: Tomás de Barra (Irish)
- Born: 20 August 1879 Glanworth, County Cork, Ireland
- Died: 23 May 1969 (aged 89) Cork, Ireland
- Occupation: Auctioneer

Sport
- Sport: Hurling
Club
- Years: Club
- 1895-1911: Hibernians
Club titles
	Football	Hurling
London titles	10	2
Inter-county
- Years: County
- 1901-1911: London
Inter-county titles
- All-Irelands: 1

Thomas J. Barry (20 August 1879 - 23 May 1969) was an Irish sportsman and revolutionary figure. He was a leading hurler and Gaelic footballer in the early 20th century and was the last-surviving member of the London-Irish team that won the All-Ireland Championship in 1901.

== Biography ==
Raised near Glanworth, County Cork, Barry was one of fifteen children born to Timothy Barry, a farmer, and his wife Hannah. He was educated by the Christian Brothers in Fermoy before emigrating to London in 1895 where he was an apprentice in the furniture trade.

Barry joined a number of Irish nationalist groups in London, including the Irish Republican Brotherhood. Already a promising hurler and Gaelic footballer before his emigration, he joined the Hibernians club and was later selected for the London-Irish teams as a dual player.

On 2 August 1903, Barry won an All-Ireland Championship medal after London's 1-05 to 0-04 defeat of Cork in the All-Ireland final at Jones' Road. It remains the only time in the history of the championship that the title was taken overseas.

Two years after returning to Cork in 1911, Barry joined the Irish Volunteers and was later elected to its executive committee. He was also the president of the Cork Young Ireland Society. During the 1916 Easter Rising, Barry was one of a large group of Cork Volunteers that marched to Macroom in anticipation of a widespread rebellion, only to find that the order for mobilisation had been countermanded.

Barry spent his final years as managing director of his own auctioneering firm. He died in Cork on 23 May 1969.
