= Ned Grey =

Irish hurler

Personal information
- Native name: Éamonn de Grae (Irish)
- Nickname: Sailor
- Born: 6 April 1896 Carrigtwohill, County Cork, Ireland
- Died: 16 June 1974 (aged 78) Carrigtwohill, County Cork, Ireland
- Occupation: Garda Síochána

Sport
- Sport: Hurling
- Position: Goalkeeper
Clubs
- Years: Club
- Carrigtwohill; Garda; Faughs
Club titles
- Cork titles: 1
Inter-county*
Years	County	Apps (scores)
1919-1922	Cork	9 (0-00)
Inter-county titles
- Munster titles: 2
- All-Irelands: 1
- *Inter County team apps and scores correct as of 22:45, 1 August 2016.

Edmond "Ned" Grey (6 April 1896 – 16 June 1974) is an Irish hurler who played as a goalkeeper for the Cork senior team.

Born in Carrigtwohill, County Cork, Grey first played competitive hurling in local games in the village. He quickly broke onto the Carrigtwohill senior team, where his brother Jimmy was already an established player, and won a championship medal when the club claimed their first title in 1918.

Grey made his debut on the inter-county scene when he first linked up with the Cork senior team for the 1919 championship. He went on to play a key role for Cork as a goalkeeper during a successful era, and won one All-Ireland medal and two Munster medals. He was an All-Ireland runner-up on one occasion.

Throughout his inter-county career Grey made 9 championship appearances. He retired from inter-county hurling following the conclusion of the 1922 championship.

== Playing career ==
=== Club ===
In 1918 Grey was in goal for Carrigtwohill's championship campaign. A bye in the first round, followed by a walkover from Redmonds in the quarter-final and a defeat of St. Finbarr's in the semi-final set up a final meeting with Blackrock. "The Rockies" settled first and went into a three-point lead before Carrig struck back with a goal from Jimmy "Major" Kennedy. Both teams added a point before the interval. Blackrock took the lead twice more in the third quarter, however, the clinching goal for Carrig came from Kennedy once again. Grey had to retire injured before the end of the game, however, the 4-1 to 1-6 victory secured a Cork Senior Hurling Championship medal.

=== Inter-county ===
Grey made his senior debut for Cork on 18 May 1919 in a 9-4 to 4-0 Munster quartet-final defeat of Waterford. He later won his first Munster medal following a 3-5 to 1-6 defeat of Limerick in the decider. On 21 September 1919, Cork faced Dublin in the All-Ireland final. Cork proved the stronger team and at half time they were coasting by 4–2 to 1–1. Grey's side held onto the lead and won the game by 6–4 to 2–4. It was Cork's first All-Ireland title in sixteen years and a medal for Grey.

1920 saw Grey win a second successive Munster medal as Limerick fell again by 3–4 to 0–5. The subsequent All-Ireland final was a replay of the previous year's game, however, the War of Independence resulted in the game being delayed until 14 May 1922. Both sides remained in the game for the majority of the hour, however, a four-goal blitz by Dublin saw them win by 4–9 to 4–3.

== Honours ==
Carrigtwohill

- Cork Senior Hurling Championship (1): 1918

Cork

- All-Ireland Senior Hurling Championship: 1919
- Munster Senior Hurling Championship (2): 1919, 1920
