= Mick Gill =

Irish hurler (1899–1980)

Personal information
- Native name: Mícheál Mac an Ghaill (Irish)
- Born: 22 September 1899 Ballinderreen, County Galway, Ireland
- Died: 21 September 1980 (aged 80) Phibsborough, Dublin, Ireland
- Occupation: Garda Síochána
- Height: 5 ft 9 in (175 cm)

Sport
- Sport: Hurling
- Position: Right wing-back
Clubs
- Years: Club
- 1918–1923 1924–1938: Ballinderreen; Garda
Club titles
- Dublin titles: 6
Inter-county
- Years: County
- 1922–1923 1924–1930 1931–1938: Galway; Dublin; Galway
Inter-county titles
- Leinster titles: 4
- All-Irelands: 3
- NHL: 2

Michael Gill (22 September 1899 – 21 September 1980) was an Irish hurler. At club level he played with Ballinderreen and Garda, and also lined out at inter-county level with Galway and Dublin. Gill is the only player to win two All-Ireland SHC medals in a single year.

== Career ==
Gill first played hurling at club level with the Ballinderreen club in south Galway. His performances for the club resulted in a call-up to the Galway senior hurling team and he made his debut in the 1922 All-Ireland semi-final defeat by Tipperary. Gill was a member of the Galway team that beat Limerick by 7–03 to 4–05 in the 1923 All-Ireland final, a match that wasn't played until September 1924.

By that stage, Gill had transferred to the Garda club in Dublin, with whom he won six Dublin SHC medal. He also declared for the Dublin senior hurling team in November 1923. Gill won his first Leinster SHC medal in his first season with the team, while he claimed his second All-Ireland SHC winners' medal, just three months after winning his first, when Dublin beat his native Galway in the 1924 All-Ireland final.

Gill was selected for the Leinster team for the inaugural Railway Cup in 1927 and ended the competition with a winners' medal after Leinster's defeat of Munster in the final. Later that season he captained Dublin when he won his second Leinster SHC medal in 1927. Gill claimed a third All-Ireland winners' medal after he captained Dublin to a defeat of Cork in the 1927 All-Ireland final.

Gill won a third Leinster SHC title with Dublin in 1928. Later that year he was selected for the Ireland team that beat the United States in the Tailteann Games. Gill added a National Hurling League medal to his collection in 1929. He won a fourth Leinster SHC medal a year later, however, Dublin were later beaten by Tipperary in the 1930 All-Ireland final.

Gill declared for Galway in 1931 and claimed a second National League title that year. He continued to line out with Galway, and also played with Conancht, until his retirement from hurling in 1938.

== Personal life and death ==
Gill trained as a member of the Garda Síochána, but left the force in 1927 with the intention of emigrating to the United States. The Wall Street crash and the subsequent depression ended this plan an he rejoined the force in 1931. He retired in 1962, having spent 20 years on security duty at Áras an Uachtaráin.

Gill died at the Mater Hospital on 21 September 1980, just one day short of his 81st birthday and just two weeks after the Galway hurlers bridged a 57-year gap to capture their second All-Ireland title.

== Honours ==
Garda

- Dublin Senior Hurling Championship: 1925, 1926, 1927, 1928, 1929, 1931

Galway

- All-Ireland Senior Hurling Championship: 1923
- National Hurling League: 1930–31

Dublin

- All-Ireland Senior Hurling Championship: 1924, 1927 (c)
- Leinster Senior Hurling Championship: 1924, 1927 (c), 1928, 1930
- National Hurling League: 1928–29

Leinster

- Railway Cup: 1927

Sporting positions
Preceded by	Dublin senior hurling team captain 1927–1929	Succeeded by Jim Walsh
Achievements
Preceded by Seán Óg Murphy	All-Ireland Senior Hurling Final winning captain 1927	Succeeded by Seán Óg Murphy
