= Kennedy Park =

Kennedy Park may refer to:

in Canada

- Kennedy Park, Toronto, a neighbourhood in Toronto, Ontario, Canada

in Ireland

- Kennedy Park (Cork, Ireland), a park in Cork city, Ireland

in the United States

- Kennedy Park (Fall River, Massachusetts), listed on the National Register of Historic Places in Massachusetts
- Kennedy Park (Holyoke, Massachusetts), a park in Holyoke, Massachusetts, United States
- Kennedy Park (Hayward, California), a park adjacent to an historic house museum
- Kennedy Park (Lewiston, Maine), a park in Lewiston, Maine, United States
- Kennedy Park (Portland, Maine), a neighborhood in Portland, Maine, United States
- Kennedy Park (Springfield, Illinois), a park in Springfield, Illinois, United States

in Peru

- Kennedy Park (Lima), a park in Miraflores District, Lima, Peru
