= Cork–Galway hurling rivalry =

Sports rivalry in Ireland

Cork-Galway
- Location: County Cork; County Galway
- Teams: Cork; Galway
- First meeting: Cork 7-12 - 1-3 Galway; 1901 All-Ireland semi-final (17 May 1903)
- Latest meeting: Galway 2-26 - 1-18 Cork; 2026 All-Ireland semi-final (4 July 2026)
- Next meeting: TBA

Statistics
- Total meetings: 35
- Top scorer: Joe Canning (2-44)
- All-time series: Championship: Cork 25-10 Galway
- Largest victory: Cork 10-13 - 0-00 Galway; 1902 All-Ireland semi-final (20 March 1904)

The Cork–Galway rivalry is a hurling rivalry between Cork and Galway. The fixture is an irregular one due to both teams playing in separate provinces.

== Roots ==
=== Statistics ===
Up to date as of 2023 season

Team	All-Ireland	Provincial	National League	Total
Cork	30	54	14	98
Galway	5	28	11	44
Combined	35	82	25	142

== Notable moments ==
- Galway 4-15 : 2-19 Cork (17 August 1975 at Croke Park) - The 1975 All Ireland semi-final took place on one of the hottest days of one of the hottest summers of the century. Cork may have been "a bit rusty" after winning Munster and over-confidence may have been a factor. In any event, Galway hit them hard and hit them fast. They scored a couple of goals early on, they continued to get scores at opportune times and come the end, they had two points in hand, 4-15 to 2-19.
- Galway 2-14 : 1-13 Cork (5 August 1979 at Croke Park) - Cork were aiming for an historic four-in-a-row and hence were the defending All-Ireland champions. After a record equalling fifth consecutive Munster title on the back of a final win over Limerick, Cork were expected to see off the Galway challenge comfortably. Galway, on the other hand, were coming with a team of their own backboned by the likes of the Connolly brothers and Noel Lane. In front of a paltry attendance of 12,315, Galway shocked the hurling world by dumping the holders out and progressed to the 1979 decider.
- Cork 5-15 : 2-21 Galway (2 September 1990 at Croke Park) - Having recovered from a poor start Galway looked likely winners when holding a seven-points lead early in the second half, but they ceded control at a critical stage. Kevin Hennessy gave Cork a dream start goaling inside the first minute and the last of their five goals, from John Fitzgibbon in the 63rd minute ensured a 27th title.

== All-time results ==
=== Legend ===
Galway win
Cork win
Drawn game

=== Senior ===
No.	Date	Winners	Score	Runners-up	Venue	Competition
1.	17 May 1903	Cork (1)	7-12 - 1-3	Galway	Markets Field	All-Ireland semi-final
2.	20 March 1904	Cork (2)	10-13 - 0-0	Galway	Tipperary	All-Ireland semi-final
3.	2 September 1906	Cork (3)	5-13 - 0-4	Galway	Markets Field	All-Ireland semi-final
4.	10 May 1908	Cork (4)	2-8 - 1-7	Galway	Markets Field	All-Ireland semi-final
5.	21 August 1910	Cork (5)	7-3 - 1-0	Galway	O'Moore Park	All-Ireland semi-final
6.	6 September 1914	Cork (6)	6-6 - 0-0	Galway	O'Moore Park	All-Ireland semi-final
7.	31 August 1919	Cork (7)	3-8 - 0-2	Galway	Markets Field	All-Ireland semi-final
8.	21 August 1927	Cork (8)	5-6 - 0-2	Galway	Thurles Sportsfield	All-Ireland semi-final
9.	9 September 1928	Cork (9)	6-12 - 1-0	Galway	Croke Park	All-Ireland final
10.	1 September 1929	Cork (10)	4-9 - 1-3	Galway	Croke Park	All-Ireland final
11.	26 July 1942	Cork (11)	6-8 - 2-4	Galway	Gaelic Grounds	All-Ireland semi-final
12.	13 August 1944	Cork (12)	1-10 - 3-3	Galway	Cusack Park	All-Ireland semi-final
13.	28 July 1946	Cork (13)	2-10 - 0-3	Galway	O'Connor Park	All-Ireland semi-final
14.	27 July 1952	Cork (14)	1-5 - 0-6	Galway	Gaelic Grounds	All-Ireland semi-final
15.	6 September 1953	Cork (15)	3-3 - 0-8	Galway	Croke Park	All-Ireland final
16.	8 August 1954	Cork (16)	4-13 - 2-1	Galway	Croke Park	All-Ireland semi-final
17.	7 June 1964	Cork (17)	4-14 - 2-7	Galway	Gaelic Grounds	Munster quarter-final
18.	23 June 1968	Cork (18)	3-15 - 1-6	Galway	Gaelic Grounds	Munster semi-final
19.	29 June 1969	Cork (19)	3-15 - 1-10	Galway	Gaelic Grounds	Munster semi-final
20.	17 August 1975	Galway (1)	4-15 - 2-19	Cork	Croke Park	All-Ireland semi-final
21.	7 August 1977	Cork (20)	3-14 - 1-15	Galway	Croke Park	All-Ireland semi-final
22.	5 August 1979	Galway (2)	2-14 - 1-13	Cork	Croke Park	All-Ireland semi-final
23.	7 August 1983	Cork (21)	5-14 - 1-16	Galway	Croke Park	All-Ireland semi-final
24.	4 August 1985	Galway (3)	4-12 - 5-5	Cork	Croke Park	All-Ireland semi-final
25.	7 September 1986	Cork (22)	4-13 - 2-15	Galway	Croke Park	All-Ireland final
26.	2 September 1990	Cork (23)	5-15 - 2-21	Galway	Croke Park	All-Ireland final
27.	13 July 2002	Galway (4)	0-21 - 1-9	Cork	Semple Stadium	All-Ireland qualifiers
28.	11 September 2005	Cork (24)	1-21 - 1-16	Galway	Croke Park	All-Ireland final
29.	19 July 2008	Cork (25)	0-23 - 2-15	Galway	Semple Stadium	All-Ireland qualifiers
30.	18 July 2009	Galway (5)	1-19 - 0-15	Cork	Semple Stadium	All-Ireland qualifiers
31.	9 July 2011	Galway (6)	2-23 - 1-14	Cork	Gaelic Grounds	All-Ireland qualifiers
32.	12 August 2012	Galway (7)	0-22 - 0-17	Cork	Croke Park	All-Ireland semi-final
33.	26 July 2015	Galway (8)	2-28 - 0-22	Cork	Semple Stadium	All-Ireland quarter-final
34.	18 June 2022	Galway (9)	2-19 - 1-21	Cork	Semple Stadium	All-Ireland quarter-final
35.	4 July 2026	Galway (10)	2-26 - 1-18	Cork	Croke Park	All-Ireland semi-final

=== Intermediate ===
No.	Date	Winners	Score	Runners-up	Venue	Competition
1.	4 June 1961	Cork (1)	7-4 - 5-3	Galway	Gaelic Grounds	Munster semi-final
2.	24 June 1962	Galway (1)	5-4 - 4-6	Cork	Gaelic Grounds	Munster final
3.	2 August 1964	Cork (2)	4-13 - 1-10	Galway	Dunlo GAA Grounds	Munster final
4.	27 June 1965	Cork (3)	6-14 - 3-4	Galway	Cork Athletic Grounds	Munster semi-final
5.	12 May 1968	Cork (4)	3-9 - 4-2	Galway		Munster semi-final
6.	3 August 1969	Cork (5)	4-14 - 0-6	Galway	Charleville	Munster final
7.	11 October 1997	Cork (6)	2-11 - 1-12	Galway	Gaelic Grounds	All-Ireland final
8.	13 October 2001	Cork (7)	1-15 - 0-17	Galway	Gaelic Grounds	All-Ireland semi-final
9.	20 August 2003	Cork (8)	5-23 - 1-10	Galway	Semple Stadium	All-Ireland semi-final
10.	6 August 2005	Galway (2)	1-15 - 0-14	Cork	Semple Stadium	All-Ireland semi-final
11.	8 August 2009	Cork (9)	2-23 - 1-10	Galway	O'Moore Park	All-Ireland semi-final
12.	26 July 2014	Cork (10)	0-21 - 0-17	Galway	O'Connor Park	All-Ireland semi-final

=== Junior ===
No.	Date	Winners	Score	Runners-up	Venue	Competition
1.	6 June 1926	Cork (1)	5-8 - 1-3	Galway	Croke Park	All-Ireland semi-final
2.	29 August 1937	Galway (1)	3-4 - 2-6	Cork	Pearse Stadium	All-Ireland semi-final
3.	25 August 1940	Cork (2)	3-3 - 3-1	Galway	Gaelic Grounds	All-Ireland final
4.	17 August 1947	Cork (3)	8-6 - 5-1	Galway	Dunlo GAA Grounds	All-Ireland semi-final
5.	18 September 1955	Cork (4)	3-10 - 4-5	Galway	MacDonagh Park	All-Ireland home final
6.	3 July 1960	Cork (5)	2-5 - 1-7	Galway	Cusack Park	Munster semi-final
7.	25 September 1983	Cork (6)	3-14 - 2-15	Galway	Gaelic Grounds	All-Ireland final
8.	4 August 1992	Cork (7)	1-12 - 0-14	Galway	Gaelic Grounds	All-Ireland semi-final
9.	30 June 1994	Cork	2-12 - 4-6	Galway	Cusack Park	All-Ireland semi-final
10.	11 July 1994	Cork (8)	1-13 - 1-9	Galway	Gaelic Grounds	All-Ireland semi-final replay
10.	7 August 1996	Cork	3-7 - 1-13	Galway	Cusack Park	All-Ireland semi-final
11.	30 August 1996	Galway (2)	1-15 - 1-6	Cork	Cusack Park	All-Ireland semi-final replay

=== Minor ===
No.	Date	Winners	Score	Runners-up	Venue	Competition
1.	15 August 1936	Cork (1)	4-6 - 1-3	Galway	St. Cronan's Park	All-Ireland semi-final
2.	7 August 1938	Cork (2)	7-4 - 5-3	Galway	Cusack Park	All-Ireland semi-final
3.	21 September 1941	Cork (3)	3-11 - 1-1	Galway	Croke Park	All-Ireland final
4.	2 September 1951	Cork (4)	4-5 - 1-8	Galway	Croke Park	All-Ireland final
5.	24 June 1964	Cork (5)		Galway	Gaelic Grounds	Munster quarter-final
6.	24 July 1966	Cork (6)	6-7 - 2-8	Galway	Gaelic Grounds	Munster final
7.	29 June 1968	Cork (7)		Galway	Gaelic Grounds	Munster semi-final
8.	29 June 1969	Cork (8)	9-11 - 1-1	Galway	Gaelic Grounds	Munster semi-final
9.	6 September 1970	Cork (9)	5-29 - 2-9	Galway	Croke Park	All-Ireland final
10.	15 August 1971	Cork (10)	4-13 - 1-4	Galway	St. Brendan's Park	All-Ireland semi-final
11.	17 August 1975	Cork (11)	6-20 - 4-7	Galway	Croke Park	All-Ireland semi-final
12.	7 August 1977	Cork (12)	3-14 - 1-6	Galway	Croke Park	All-Ireland semi-final
13.	5 August 1979	Cork (13)	6-15 - 0-6	Galway	Croke Park	All-Ireland semi-final
14.	4 August 1985	Cork (14)	3-9 - 3-2	Galway	Croke Park	All-Ireland semi-final
15.	12 August 1995	Cork (15)	2-8 - 0-12	Galway	Semple Stadium	All-Ireland semi-final
16.	10 September 2000	Galway (1)	2-19 - 4-10	Cork	Croke Park	All-Ireland final
17.	9 September 2001	Cork (16)	2-10 - 1-8	Galway	Croke Park	All-Ireland final
18.	28 July 2002	Galway (2)	2-10 - 2-6	Cork	Croke Park	All-Ireland quarter-final
19.	15 August 2004	Galway (3)	2-15 - 1-13	Cork	Croke Park	All-Ireland semi-final
20.	13 August 2005	Galway (4)	4-13 - 1-9	Cork	O'Moore Park	All-Ireland semi-final
21.	6 August 2006	Galway (5)	2-12 - 0-16	Cork	Croke Park	All-Ireland semi-final
22.	29 July 2007	Cork (17)	2-19 - 0-8	Galway	Croke Park	All-Ireland quarter-final
23.	17 August 2008	Galway (6)	1-18 - 0-17	Cork	Croke Park	All-Ireland semi-final
