= 1896 Cork Junior Hurling Championship =

Sporting event in County Cork, Ireland

- Champions: Carrigtwohill (1st title); J. Crowley (captain)
- Runners-up: Redmonds; J. Gleeson (captain)

The 1896 Cork Junior Hurling Championship was the second staging of the Cork Junior Hurling Championship since its establishment by the Cork County Board.

The final was played on 18 October 1896 at Queenstown Junction Grounds in Glounthaune, between Carrigtwohill and Redmonds. Carrigtwohill won the match by 7–02 to 0–04 to claim their first ever championship title in the grade.

== Results ==
=== Final ===
18 October 1896 Final	Carrigtwohill	7-02 - 0-4	Redmonds	Queenstown Junction Grounds
				Referee: Mr. O'Connell (Queenstown)
