= 1950 Cork Intermediate Hurling Championship =

Irish hurling competition

- Dates: 30 April – 22 October 1950
- Teams: 12
- Champions: Carrigtwohill (3rd title); Willie John Daly (captain)
- Runners-up: Shanballymore

Tournament statistics
- Matches played: 11
- Goals scored: 80 (7.27 per match)
- Points scored: 95 (8.64 per match)

The 1950 Cork Intermediate Hurling Championship was the 41st staging of the Cork Intermediate Hurling Championship since its establishment by the Cork County Board in 1909. The draw for the opening round fixtures took place on 29 January 1950. The championship ran from 30 April to 22 October 1950.

Carrigtwohill entered the championship as the defending champions.

The final was played on 22 October 1950 at the Athletic Grounds in Cork, between Carrigtwohill and Shanballymore, in what was their first ever meeting in the final. Carrigtwohill won the match by 6–04 to 1–01 to claim their third championship title overall and a second title in succession.

== Results ==
=== First round ===
30 April 1950 First round	Carrigtwohill	6-04 - 3-04	Midleton	Clonmult Memorial Park

7 May 1950 First round	Mallow	5-04 - 3-04	Kildorrery	Shanballymore Grounds

7 May 1950 First round	Buttevant	5-07 - 1-01	Nemo Rangers	Kanturk Grounds

28 May 1950 First round	Newtownshandrum	2-00 - 3-07	Bandon	Cork Athletic Grounds

18 June 1950 First round	Carrigaline	3-02 - 6-05	Ballincollig	Cork Athletic Grounds

18 June 1950 First round	Shanballymore	7-08 - 2-05	Douglas	Mallow Town Park

=== Second round ===
9 July 1950 Second round	Mallow	2-06 - 3-06	Shanballymore	Doneraile Grounds

9 July 1950 Second round	Buttevant	2-06 - 5-06	Ballincollig	Cork Athletic Grounds

- Bandon and Carrigtwohill received byes in this round.

=== Semi-final ===
6 August 1950 Semi-final	Shanballymore	4-06 - 2-01	Ballincollig	Cork Athletic Grounds

10 September 1950 Semi-final	Carrigtwohill	5-04 - 1-04	Bandon	Cork Athletic Grounds

=== Final ===
22 October 1950 Final	Carrigtwohill	6-04 - 6-01	Shanballymore	Cork Athletic Grounds
