= 1948 Cork Junior Hurling Championship =

Irish hurling competition

- Teams: 7
- Champions: Carrigtwohill (3rd title); Willie O'Neill (captain)
- Runners-up: Cloughduv

The 1948 Cork Junior Hurling Championship was the 51st staging of the Cork Junior Hurling Championship since its establishment by the Cork County Board.

On 13 December 1948, Carrigtwohill won the championship following a 6-05 to 1-01 defeat of CLoughduv in the final at the Cork Athletic Grounds. This was their third championship title overall and a first title since 1941.

== Results ==
=== Final ===
13 December 1948 Final	Carrigtwohill	6-05 - 1-01	Cloughduv	Cork Athletic Grounds
