= Jack Leonard =

Jack Leonard may refer to:

- Jack Leonard (footballer) (1876 – after 1899), English footballer
- Jack Leonard (hurler) (1873–1938), Irish hurler
- Jack E. Leonard (1910–1973), American comedian and actor
