= 1897 Cork Junior Hurling Championship =

Irish hurling competition

- Champions: Redmonds (1st title)
- Runners-up: Carrigtwohill

The 1897 Cork Junior Hurling Championship was the third staging of the Cork Junior Hurling Championship since its establishment by the Cork County Board in 1895.

The final was due to be played between Redmonds and Carrigtwohill, however, a suitable playing field was unavailable for the match after Carrigtwohill objected to playing at a number of suggested venues. Redmonds were later declared the champions without the final being played. Redmonds won the match by 6–02 to 2–05 to claim their second championship title in succession.
