= Bertie Mullins =

Irish hurler

Personal information
- Native name: Beircheart Ó Maoláin (Irish)
- Born: 1897 Turners Cross, Cork, Ireland

Sport
- Sport: Hurling
- Position: Left corner-forward
Clubs
- Years: Club
- Nemo Rangers; Redmonds
Club titles
- Cork titles: 0
Inter-county*
Years	County	Apps (scores)
1923-1926	Cork	3 (1-0)
Inter-county titles
- Munster titles: 0
- All-Irelands: 0
- NHL: 0
- *Inter County team apps and scores correct as of 01:42, 7 April 2015.

Bartholomew "Bertie" Mullins was an Irish hurler who played as a full-forward for the Cork senior team.

Born in Turners Cross, Cork, Mullins first arrived on the inter-county scene when he first linked up with the Cork senior team. He made his senior debut during the 1923 championship. Mullins was a regular member of the panel over the next few years and won All-Ireland medal and one Munster medal as a non-playing substitute.

At club level Mullins began his career with Nemo Rangers, with whom he won one championship medal in the intermediate grade. He later lined out with Redmonds.

Throughout his career Murphy made three championship appearances. He retired from inter-county hurling following the conclusion of the 1926 championship.

== Playing career ==
=== Club ===
In 1918 Mullins was on the nemo Rangers team that faced Mallow in the intermediate decider. A 7-5 to 0-1 trouncing gave Mullins a championship medal in that grade,

Mullins subsequently joined the Redmonds club but enjoyed little success.

=== Inter-county ===
Mullins made his senior championship debut on 24 June 1923 in a 13-2 to 0-1 Munster quarter-final defeat of Waterford.

Two years later in 1926 Mullins was an unused substitute during Cork's successful championship campaign, however, he collected a set of All-Ireland and Munster medals following respective defeats of Tipperary and Kilkenny.

== Honours ==
=== Player ===
Nemo Rangers

- Cork Intermediate Hurling Championship (1): 1918

Cork

- All-Ireland Senior Hurling Championship (1): 1926 (sub)
- Munster Senior Hurling Championship (1): 1926 (sub)
