= 1933 Cork Senior Hurling Championship =

Annual hurling competition season

- Dates: 2 April 1933 – 22 October 1933
- Teams: 15
- Champions: St. Finbarr's (10th title); Johnny Kenneally (captain)
- Runners-up: Carrigtwohill; Tom Barry (captain)

Tournament statistics
- Matches played: 15
- Goals scored: 109 (7.27 per match)
- Points scored: 110 (7.33 per match)

The 1933 Cork Senior Hurling Championship was the 45th staging of the Cork Senior Hurling Championship since its establishment by the Cork County Board in 1887. The draw for the opening round fixtures took place at the Cork Convention on 30 January 1933. The championship began on 2 April 1933 and ended on 22 October 1933.

St. Finbarr's were the defending champions. Divisional sides Avondhu, Carbery and Muskerry fielded teams in the championship for the first time.

On 22 October 1933, St. Finbarr's won the championship following a 6–6 to 5–0 defeat of Carrigtwohill in a replay of the final. This was their 10th championship title overall and their second title in succession.

== Results ==
=== First round ===
2 April 1933 First round	Ballyhea	0-02 - 3-02	Redmonds	Bishop Casey Memorial Park, Mallow

9 April 1933 First round	Passage	2-03 - 9-02	St. Finbarr's	Cork Athletic Grounds, Cork
				Referee: J Desmond

30 April 1933 First round	Éire Óg	6-05 - 6-03	Carbery	Bandon Sportsfield, Bandon
				Referee: J Kenneally (Redmonds)

30 April 1933 First round	University College Cork	3-05 - 3-01	St. Anne's	The Mardyke, Cork

30 April 1933 First round	Avondhu	6-04 - 9-06	Sarsfields	Buttevant Sportsfield, Buttevant

14 May 1933 First round	Blackrock	0-02 - 2-06	Carrigtwohill	The Mardyke, Cork

21 May 1933 First round	Muskerry	3-04 - 2-05	Glen Rovers	Blarney Sportsfield, Blarney

=== Second round ===
18 June 1933 Second round	Mallow	8-04 - 1-01	University College Cork	Buttevant Sportsfield, Buttevant

13 August 1933 Second round	Redmonds	2-03 - 1-05	Éire Óg	Cork Athletic Grounds, Cork

27 August 1933 Second round	Muskerry	1-03 - 5-04	St. Finbarr's	The Mardyke, Cork

3 September 1933 Second round	Carrigtwohill	2-06 - 1-06	Sarsfields	Cork Athletic Grounds, Cork

=== Semi-finals ===
17 September 1933 Semi-final	St. Finbarr's	5-07 - 3-01	Mallow	Cork Athletic Grounds, Cork

24 September 1933 Semi-final	Carrigtwohill	5-04 - 1-01	Redmonds	Cork Athletic Grounds, Cork

=== Finals ===
8 October 1933 Final	St. Finbarr's	4-06 - 5-03	Carrigtwohill	Cork Athletic Grounds, Cork
	J Kenneally 2-1, J O'Keeffe 1-0 (og), W Stanton 0-2, J O'Sullivan 0-2, C Cronin 0-1, another goal was scored from a rush.		T O'Donovan 2-1, J McCarthy 1-0, J Morey 1-0, R Ring 1-0, D McCarthy 0-1, T Barry 0-1.	Referee: J Regan

22 October 1933 Final replay	St. Finbarr's	6-06 - 5-00	Carrigtwohill	Cork Athletic Grounds, Cork
	J Kenneally 3-0, D Stanton 1-4, M Kenneally 1-0, Lehane 1-0, J O'Sullivan 0-1, W Stanton 0-1.		J Morey 2-0, R Ring 2-0, M McCarthy 1-0.	Attendance: 14,157; Referee: W Gleeson (Limerick)

== Championship statistics ==
=== Miscellaneous ===
- Divisional sides Avondhu, Carbery and Muskerry fielded teams in the championship for the first time.
