= 1909 Cork Junior Hurling Championship =

Irish hurling competition

- Champions: Redmonds (5th title)
- Runners-up: Aghabullogue

The 1909 Cork Junior Hurling Championship was the 15th staging of the Cork Junior Hurling Championship since its establishment by the Cork County Board in 1895.

The final was played on 31 October 1909 at the Athletic Grounds in Ballincollig, between Redmonds and Aghabullogue, in what was their first ever meeting in the final. Redmonds won the match by 4-12 to 1-03 to claim their fifth championship title overall and a first championship title in nine years.

== Results ==
=== Final ===
31 October 1909 Final	Redmonds	4-12 - 1-03	Aghabullogue	Ballincollig Athletic Grounds
