= David Ahern (hurler) =

Irish hurler

Personal information
- Native name: Daithí Ó hEathírn (Irish)
- Occupation: Army officer

Sport
- Sport: Hurling
- Position: Full-forward
Club
- Years: Club
- Collins
Club titles
- Cork titles: 0
Inter-county*
Years	County	Apps (scores)
1924-1928	Cork	7 (3-1)
Inter-county titles
- Munster titles: 1
- All-Irelands: 0
- NHL: 0
- *Inter County team apps and scores correct as of 01:42, 7 April 2015.

David Ahern was an Irish hurler who played as a full-forward for the Cork senior team.

Murphy first arrived on the inter-county scene when he first linked up with the Cork senior team. He made his senior debut during the 1924 championship. Ahern immediately became a regular member of the starting fifteen, and won one Munster medal on the field of play. He also won two All-Ireland medals as a non-playing substitute.

At club level Murphy played with Collins.

Throughout his career Murphy made 7 championship appearances. He retired from inter-county hurling following the conclusion of the 1928 championship.

== Playing career ==
=== Inter-county ===
Ahern made his senior championship debut on 4 May 1924 in an 8–3 to 3-0 Munster quarter-final defeat of Waterford.

Two years later in 1926 Ahern won his only Munster medal on the field of play following a three-game saga with Tipperary, culminating in a 3–6 to 2–4 victory for Cork. He was dropped for the subsequent All-Ireland decider against Kilkenny, a game which Cork won by 4–6 to 2–0.

After being dropped from the panel in 1927, Ahern was back the following year. He was an unused substitute as he collected a second Munster medal following a 6–4 to 2–2 defeat of Clare in a replay. Ahern also remained on the bench as Cork bested Galway by 6–12 to 1–0 to take the All-Ireland crown once again.

== Honours ==
=== Player ===
Cork

- All-Ireland Senior Hurling Championship (2): 1926 (sub), 1928 (sub)
- Munster Senior Hurling Championship (2): 1926, 1928
