= John Mahony =

Irish hurler

Personal information
- Native name: Seán Ó Mathúna (Irish)
- Born: Ballyduff, County Kerry

Sport
- Sport: Hurling
- Position: Half-back
Club
- Years: Club
- Ballyduff
Inter-county
- Years: County
- 1890s: Kerry
Inter-county titles
- Munster titles: 1
- All-Irelands: 1

John Mahony (1 January 1864 – 31 December 1943) was an Irish sportsperson. He played hurling at with his local club Ballyduff and with the Kerry senior inter-county team in the 1890s. Mahony captained Kerry to their only All-Ireland hurling title in 1891.

== Biography ==
John Mahony was born in Kilmore, Ballyduff, County Kerry in 1864. The son of John and Bridget (née Doran), he grew up in an area that was and still is famous for hurling. Like many of his contemporaries Mahony earned his living from fishing and from thatching roofs. He later gained a reputation as a fine sportsman and as an outspoken individual.

John Mahony died at Christmas time in 1943.

== Playing career ==
=== Club ===
Mahony played his club hurling with his local club in Ballyduff and enjoyed some success. He won his first senior county title in 1891 following a 1–0 to 0–2 defeat of Kilmoyley in the county final. It was Ballyduff's first victory in the county championship and their last until 1955.

=== Inter-county ===
Ballyduff's county championship victory allowed the club to represent Kerry in the Munster and All-Ireland championships. Mahony, one of the stalwarts of the team, was also appointed captain for the year.

The semi-final of the Munster Championship saw Kerry take on Cork, the reigning All-Ireland champions. In spite of facing an uphill battle Mahony's side easily defeated ‘the Rebels’ by 2–7 to 0–3. This victory allowed Kerry to advance to the Munster final where Limerick provided the opposition. The death of Charles Stewart Parnell and the political tensions of the era meant that the playing of game was in doubt; however, it eventually went ahead. Kerry, however, were defeated on that occasion by 1–2 to 1-1. Kerry, however, launched an objection and were successful, thus forcing a replay. Kerry were far superior in the second game, displaying their overhead and ground skills, and defeated Limerick by 2–4 to 0–1. This victory allowed Kerry to advance to the All-Ireland where Wexford provided the opposition. The game itself was the second game of a triple-header played at Clonturk Park on 28 February 1892. The first game that day was the All-Ireland football semi-final between Dublin and Cavan. This was followed by the All-Ireland furling final and the programme of games finished with the All-Ireland football final between Cork and the winners of the first game. The hurling decider was an exciting affair with the Kerry team playing in their bare feet in grey jumpers with a gold band. Paddy 'Carr' O'Carroll scored Kerry's first point after five minutes with the team's second score coming after another twenty minutes. At half-time Kerry led by 0–2 to 0–1. The game, however, was not without controversy. At full-time the referee said that the score was 1-1 apiece and that extra-time was necessary. The Kerry team were reluctant to play the extra thirty minutes with captain Mahony one of the most vocal opponents. It was only after being persuaded by the chairman of the Kerry County Board that the team decided to line out for a third half-hour of hurling. Both sides upped their games considerably for the only occasion that extra time was played in an All-Ireland final. Kerry went on to win the game by 2–3 to 1–5 to capture their first and only All-Ireland title.

Sporting positions
Preceded by	Kerry Senior Hurling Captain; 1891	Succeeded by
Achievements
Preceded by Dan Lane (Cork)	All-Ireland Senior Hurling winning captain 1891	Succeeded by Bill O'Callaghan (Cork)
