= 1901 Cork Senior Hurling Championship =

Annual hurling competition season

- Champions: Redmonds (3rd title); John Leonard (captain)
- Runners-up: St. Finbarr's

The 1901 Cork Senior Hurling Championship was the 15th staging of the Cork Senior Hurling Championship since its establishment by the Cork County Board in 1887.

Redmonds were the defending champions.

Redmonds won the championship following a 1–11 to 2–4 defeat of St. Finbarr's in the final. This was their third championship title overall and their second title in succession. They would go on to win the Munster Senior Hurling Championship representing Cork but would later lose the final of the 1901 All-Ireland Hurling Championship to London.

== Results ==
Final

15 December 1901 Final	Redmonds	1-11 – 2-04	St. Finbarr's	Turners Cross, Cork
