= Seán Óg Murphy =

Irish hurler (1892–1956)

Jackie "Seán Óg" Murphy
Personal information
- Native name: Seán Ó Murchú (Irish)
- Nickname: Seán Óg
- Born: 17 September 1892 Fish Street, Cork, Ireland
- Died: 11 June 1956 (aged 63) Bon Secours Hospital, Cork, Ireland
- Occupation: Claims supervisor
- Height: 5 ft 9 in (175 cm)

Sport
- Sport: Hurling
- Position: Full-back
Clubs
- Years: Club
- St Vincent's; Blackrock; Nils
Club titles
	Football	Hurling
Cork titles	4	5
Inter-county*
Years	County	Apps (scores)
1912–1929	Cork	41 (0-00)
Inter-county titles
- Munster titles: 6
- All-Irelands: 3
- NHL: 0
- *Inter County team apps and scores correct as of 18:06, 1 July 2014.

John Francis "Seán Óg" Murphy (17 September 1892 – 11 June 1956) was an Irish hurler who played as a full-back for the Cork senior team.

Born in Merchant Street, Cork, Murphy first played competitive hurling during his schooling at the North Monastery. He arrived on the inter-county scene at the age of fifteen when he first linked up with the Cork senior team. He made his debut in the 1914 championship. Murphy went on to play a key role for the next fifteen years, and won three All-Ireland medals and six Munster medals. An All-Ireland runner-up on three occasions, Murphy also captained the team to All-Ireland victory in 1926 and 1928.

Murphy represented the Munster inter-provincial team at various times throughout his career, winning two Railway Cup medals in 1928 and 1928. At club level he won five championship medals with Blackrock, after beginning his career with St Vincent's.

Throughout his career, Murphy made 41 championship appearances for Cork. His retirement came following an injury sustained prior to the start of the 1929 championship.

In retirement from playing Murphy became involved in team selection and local GAA administrative affairs in Cork. He served as secretary of the Cork County Board for almost thirty years. Murphy was also a selector to the Cork senior team, being involved with six All-Ireland-winning teams.

Murphy is widely regarded as one of Cork's greatest ever hurlers. He has been repeatedly voted onto teams made up of the sport's greats, including at full-back on the Cork Hurling Team of the Century. The cup awarded to the winners of the senior hurling championship in Cork is named in his honour.

== Early life ==
Seán Óg Murphy was born in Merchant Street, Cork in 1897. The son of a publican, he was educated locally at St. Peter and Paul School before later attending both the South Monastery and the North Monastery secondary schools. At the North Mon Murphy joined the school's first-ever hurling team before later joining his local club St Vincent's. Following his education Murphy worked as a claims supervisor with the City of Cork Steampacket Company. He subsequently moved from the northside to the southside of Cork and joined Blackrock National Hurling Club, the most successful hurling club in Cork.

== Playing career ==
=== Club ===
Murphy played his club hurling with Blackrock National Hurling Club and his club football with Nils. He had much success with these two clubs in the Cork County Championships. With Nils he won junior football titles in 1913 and 1914. Murphy and his teammate, Sean Shanahan, won several titles. He and Shanahan remained great friends until Shanahan's death in 1943. The club stepped up to senior level after the latter win, with Murphy winning further titles in 1915, 1917 (as captain), 1924 and 1925. With his beloved Blackrock hurling team he won county titles in 1913, 1920, 1924, 1925 and 1927. The last three wins featured Murphy as captain of the side.

=== Inter-county ===
Murphy showed such great talent as a young hurler that he was drafted onto the Cork team for the 1912 All-Ireland final against Kilkenny. On that occasion Murphy remained on the substitute's bench as the Cats captured their second All-Ireland title on their way to their only three-in-a-row.

Three years later in 1915 Murphy was on Cork's starting fifteen. That year he collected his first Munster title as Cork defeated Clare by 8–2 to 2–1. The subsequent All-Ireland final saw Cork take on Laois. At half-time Murphy's side took a 3–0 to 2–2 lead, however, Laois fought back in the second half to claim the victory.

Four years later in 1919 Murphy added a second Munster title to his collection as Limerick were defeated by 3–5 to 1–6. Once again Cork reached the All-Ireland final where Dublin provided the opposition. At half-time Cork were coasting by 4–2 to 1–1. Murphy's side held onto the lead and won the game by 6–4 to 2–4. It was Cork's first All-Ireland title in sixteen years and it was Murphy's first All-Ireland medal.

1920 saw Murphy win a third Munster title as Limerick fell again by 3–4 to 0–5. The subsequent All-Ireland final was a replay of the previous year's game as Dublin provided the opposition once again. Both sides remained in the game for the majority of the hour, however, a four-goal blitz by Dublin saw that side win by 4–9 to 4–3.

Cork were defeated in the provincial championship for the next few seasons as Limerick and Tipperary came to dominate the competition. In the winter and spring of 1925–1926 the inaugural National Hurling League was played. Cork reached the final of that competition and defeated Dublin, giving Murphy, who was serving as captain, a National League meda.. Cork later proved themselves by reaching the Munster final. Tipperary were the opponents on that occasion and took a 1–2 to 0–0 lead. At that point the game was abandoned and a replay was ordered. The second game was a much tighter affair with both sides finishing level on a score line of 4–1 to 3–4. The third game was also a close affair, however, Cork pulled through to win by 3–6 to 2–4, giving Murphy a fourth Munster title. The subsequent All-Ireland final pitted Cork against Kilkenny at a snow-covered Croke Park in October of that year. Murphy's side took the lead at half-time and held on to win by 4–6 to 2–0. It was Murphy's second All-Ireland medal, his first as captain.

Cork retained their Munster title in 1927 with a 5–3 to 3–4 victory over Clare. The subsequent All-Ireland final saw Cork take on Dublin once again. Cork fell behind by 2–3 to 0–1 at half-time; however, they fought back in the second-half. In a team made up of nine members of the Garda Síochána 'the Dubs' claimed the victory by 4–8 to 1–3.

In 1928 Cork faced Clare in the Munster final for the second year in-a-row. Murphy was captain for the third year. That game ended in a draw, however, in the replay Cork triumphed with Murphy collecting sixth Munster title. Cork later defeated Dublin in the All-Ireland semi-final before lining out against Galway in the championship decider. Galway got a bye into the final without picking up a hurley, however, the game turned into a rout. A score line of 6–12 to 1–0 gave Cork the victory and gave Murphy a third All-Ireland medal. 1928 also saw Murphy lining out with the Irish Hurling Team in the Tailteann Games, Ireland's answer to the Olympic Games.

In 1929 an injury in a game against Clare ended Murphy's hurling career. The timing was unfortunate because if he was fit enough to play he would have won another set of Munster and All-Ireland medals.

=== Provincial ===
Murphy also lined out with Munster in the inter-provincial hurling competition. He first played for his province as captain in the inaugural year of the Railway Cup competition in 1927, however, Leinster were the victors on that occasion. Murphy served as captain again in 1928 and 1929 as he collected two Railway Cup winners' medals.

== Post-playing career ==
In retirement from playing Murphy maintained a keen interest in Cork's hurling and football affairs. In 1929 he was appointed secretary of the Cork County Board, one of the most demanding jobs in the country. He served in that position until his death.

Murphy also served as a selector on various Cork hurling teams over a period of four decades. While still a player he was a selector on the Cork teams that won the All-Ireland title sunder his captaincy in 1926 and 1928. Even though an injury brought his hurling career to an end Murphy served as a selector as Cork won two more All-Ireland titles in 1929 and 1931. He was a key member of the backroom team again as Cork won six more All-Ireland titles in 1941, 1943, 1944, 1952, 1953 and 1954. As a tribute to Murphy the trophy awarded to the winners of the Cork Senior Hurling Championship is called the Seán Óg Murphy Cup.

Jackie 'Seán Óg' Murphy died from a heart attack on 11 June 1956. He was posthumously honoured in 2000 when he was named in the full-back position on the Cork Hurling Team of the Century.

Sporting positions
Preceded by	Cork Senior Hurling Captain; 1926–1928	Succeeded by Dinny Barry-Murphy
Preceded by Pádraig Ó Caoimh	Secretary of the Cork County Board of the GAA; 1929–1956	Succeeded by Con Murphy
Achievements
Preceded by Johnny Leahy (Tipperary)	All-Ireland Senior Hurling Final winning captain 1926	Succeeded by Mick Gill (Dublin)
Preceded by Mick Gill (Dublin)	All-Ireland Senior Hurling Final winning captain 1928	Succeeded by Dinny Barry-Murphy (Cork)
Preceded by Wattie Dunphy (Leinster)	Railway Cup Hurling Final winning captain 1928; 1929	Succeeded by Dinny Barry-Murphy (Munster)

== Sources ==
- Corry, Eoghan, The GAA Book of Lists (Hodder Headline Ireland, 2005).
- Cronin, Jim, Making Connections – A Cork G.A.A Miscellany, (2005).
