= 1913 Cork Intermediate Hurling Championship =

Irish hurling competition

- Champions: Redmonds (1st title)
- Runners-up: Cloyne

The 1913 Cork Intermediate Hurling Championship was the fifth staging of the Cork Intermediate Hurling Championship since its establishment by the Cork County Board.

Redmonds won the championship following a 5–3 to 1–0 defeat of Cloyne in the final.

== Results ==
Final

Final	Ballincollig	5-03 - 1-00	Cloyne
