= Dannix Ring =

Irish hurler (1900–1960)

Daniel Ring
Personal information
- Native name: Dónall Ó Rinn (Irish)
- Nickname: Dannix
- Born: 28 May 1900 Denroches Cross, Cork, Ireland
- Died: 9 February 1960 (aged 59) St. Joseph's Hospital, Cork, Ireland
- Occupation: Corporation labourer

Sport
- Sport: Hurling
- Position: Centre-back
Clubs
- Years: Club
- Fr. O'Leary Hall; St Finbarr's
Club titles
- Cork titles: 4
Inter-county
Years	County	Apps (scores)
1919-1925	Cork	12 (2-02)
Inter-county titles
- Munster titles: 2
- All-Irelands: 1

Daniel Ring (28 May 1900 – 9 February 1960) was an Irish hurler who played as a centre-back at senior level for the Cork county team.

Ring made his first appearance for the team during the 1919 championship and was a regular member of the starting fifteen until his retirement after the 1925 championship. During that time he won one All-Ireland medal and two Munster medals.

At club level Ring was a multiple county championship medalist with St Finbarr's.

Sporting positions
Preceded by John Dorney	Cork Senior Hurling Captain; 1922-1924	Succeeded by
