= Tony O'Shaughnessy =

Irish hurler

Personal information
- Native name: Tónaí Ó Seacnasaigh (Irish)
- Born: 6 July 1930 Cork, Ireland
- Died: 15 December 2006 (aged 76) Cork, Ireland
- Occupation: Travelling salesman
- Height: 5 ft 8 in (173 cm)

Sport
- Sport: Hurling
- Position: Left corner-back
Club
- Years: Club
- St Finbarr's
Club titles
	Football	Hurling
Cork titles	2	1
Inter-county*
Years	County	Apps (scores)
1952–1957	Cork	15 (0-00)
Inter-county titles
- Munster titles: 4
- All-Irelands: 3
- NHL: 1
- *Inter County team apps and scores correct as of 22:54, 13 April 2015.

Anthony O'Shaughnessy (6 July 1930 – 15 December 2006) was an Irish hurler who played as a left corner-back at senior level for the Cork county team.

Born in Cork, O'Shaughnessy arrived on the inter-county scene at 22 when he first linked up with the Cork senior team. He made his debut during the 1952 championship. O'Shaughnessy immediately became a regular member of the team and won three All-Ireland medals, three Munster medals and one National Hurling League medal. He was an All-Ireland runner-up on one occasion.

As a member of the Munster inter-provincial team on several occasions O'Shaughnessy won two Railway Cup medals. At club level he won a combined total of three championship medals as a dual player with St Finbarr's.

Throughout his career O'Shaughnessy made 15 championship appearances. He retired from inter-county hurling following the conclusion of the 1957 championship.

In retirement from playing O'Shaughnessy became involved in team management and coaching. He was a selector with Cork's All-Ireland-winning team in 1966.

== Playing career ==
=== Inter-county ===
O'Shaughnessy first played for Cork when he made his senior debut on 22 June 1952 in a 6–6 to 2–4 Munster semi-final defeat of Limerick. He later won his first Munster medal courtesy of a late Paddy Barry goal which secured a 1–11 to 2–6 defeat of four-in-a-row hopefuls Tipperarymedal. On 7 September 1952 Cork faced Dublin in the All-Ireland decider. An appendicitis ruled Joe Hartnett out of the game, resulting in Willie John Daly being switched to centre-forward. Liam Dowling scored a vital goal in the first half to give Cork the interval lead. Dublin's attack collapsed in the second half as Dowling scored a second goal. The 2–14 to 0–7 victory gave O'Shaughnessy his first All-Ireland medal.

In 1953 O'Shaughnessy added a National Hurling League medal to his collection as Cork defeated Tipperary by 2–10 to 2–7. In the subsequent provincial championship he won a second Munster medal as Cork once again downed their arch rivals by 3–10 to 1–11. On 6 September 1953 Cork faced Galway in what was one of the dirtiest All-Ireland deciders of all time. Galway went into the game with the intention of upsetting their opponents physically and did just that, however, the game remains clouded in controversy due to the injury to the Galway captain, Mick Burke. The result remained in doubt right up to the final whistle, however, Cork secured a 3–3 to 0–8 victory giving O'Shaughnessy his second All-Ireland medal. After the match at the Gresham Hotel in Dublin a fight broke out when another Galway player struck Cork's Christy Ring. The following morning another fight broke out when another member of the Galway panel attempted to hit Ring. The fights, however, ended just as quickly as they had started.

Cork secured a third successive provincial title in 1954, with O'Shaughnessy collecting a third Munster medal following a narrow 2–8 to 1–8 defeat of Tipperary. A record crowd of 84,856 attended the subsequent All-Ireland decider on 5 September 1954 with Wexford providing the opposition. Wexford had a four-point lead with seventeen minutes left to play, however, history was against the Leinster champions when Johnny Clifford scored the winning goal for Cork with just four minutes left. A narrow 1–9 to 1–6 victory secured a third successive All-Ireland for Cork and for O'Shaughnessy.

Four-in-a-row proved beyond Cork, however, the team bounced back in 1955 with O'Shaughnessy as captain. After missing the team's provincial defeat of Limerick due to injury, he was back on the starting fifteen for the subsequent hAll-Ireland final meeting with Wexford on 23 September 1956. The game has gone down in history as one of the all-time classics as Christy Ring was bidding for a record ninth All-Ireland medal. The game turned on one important incident as the Wexford goalkeeper, Art Foley, made a miraculous save from a Ring shot and cleared the sliotar up the field to set up another attack. Nicky Rackard scored a crucial goal with two minutes to go giving Wexford a 2–14 to 2–8 victory.

Cork surrendered their Munster title to an up-and-coming Waterford team in 1957, bringing the curtain down on Daly's inter-county career.

=== Inter-provincial ===
O'Shaughnessy also lined out with Munster in the inter-provincial hurling championship. He first played with his province in 1953. That year Munster defeated Leinster in the final, giving O'Shaughnessy his first Railway Cup medal. After defeat in 1954 and 1956 O'Shaughnessy added a second Railway Cup medal to his collection in 1957.

== Death ==
Tony O'Shaughnessy died in Cork on 15 December 2006. He was survived by his wife Kathleen Fitzgerald and five of his six children, Brendan, Michael, Emer, Gerard, and Clare,

Preceded by Vincy Twomey	Cork Senior Hurling Captain; 1956	Succeeded by Christy Ring
Preceded by Christy Ring	Cork Senior Hurling Captain; 1956	Succeeded by Mick Cashman
