= Denis O'Keeffe =

Irish hurler

Denis O’Keeffe
Personal information
- Native name: Donnacha Ó Cuív (Irish)
- Nickname: Rookereen
- Born: Cork, Ireland

Sport
- Sport: Hurling
- Position: Forward
Club
- Years: Club
- 1890s-1900s: Redmonds
Club titles
- Cork titles: 2
Inter-county
- Years: County
- 1900-1907: Cork
Inter-county titles
- Munster titles: 3
- All-Irelands: 2

Denis ‘Rookereen’ O’Keeffe was an Irish sportsperson. He played hurling with his local club Redmonds and was a member of the Cork senior inter-county team from 1900 until 1907.

== Playing career ==
=== Club ===
O’Keeffe played his club hurling with the famous Redmonds team in Cork and enjoyed some success. He won back-to-back county senior championship titles with the club in 1900 and 1901.

=== Inter-county ===
O’Keeffe first tasted success on the inter-county scene with Cork in 1901 when he lined out in his first Munster final. Clare provided the opposition on that occasion and a high-scoring game followed. At the final whistle Cork were the winners by 3–10 to 2-6 and O’Keeffe collected a Munster winners’ medal. Cork subsequently defeated Galway and Wexford to set up an All-Ireland final meeting with London. Cork were the overwhelming favourites against a team of exiles which was made up of nine Cork men. A downpour made the underfoot conditions difficult as London settled better and Cork floundered. A goal for London with ten minutes left in the game sealed Cork's fate and O’Keeffe ended up on the losing side by 1–5 to 0–4.

O’Keeffe missed Cork's Munster final victory over Limerick in 1902, however, he was for subsequent games. Galway and Dublin were later defeated as Cork booked their place in the All-Ireland final and, for the second year in-a-row, London provided the opposition. The game was played in Cork to mark the opening of the new Cork Athletic Ground. O’Keeffe's side made no mistake on this occasion and powered to a 3–13 to 0–0 victory. It was a huge triumph for Cork and gave O’Keeffe an All-Ireland winners’ medal.

O’Keeffe was still a key member of the Cork team again in 1903, however, once again he missed Cork's Munster final defeat of Waterford. O’Keeffe was back on the team later as Cork received a walkover from Galway before defeating Kilkenny in the ‘home’ championship decider. London provided the opposition for a third time in the proper All-Ireland final. Cork were well on top for the entire game and secured a 3–16 to 1–1 victory. It was O’Keeffe's second consecutive All-Ireland winners’ medal.

In 1904 O’Keeffe and Cork were attempting to capture a third All-Ireland title in-a-row. The campaign began well with Cork defeating Tipperary to secure a fourth consecutive Munster title, however, once again O’Keeffe missed the provincial decider. He was back for the subsequent trouncing of Antrim which set up an All-Ireland final showdown with Kilkenny. It was the beginning of a hugely successful era for ‘the Cats’ as Cork were heading into decline. Kilkenny won the game thanks to Dick Doyle’s first-half goal, while Pat ‘Fox’ Maher made great save at the end to help his team to a 1–9 to 1–8 defeat of O’Keeffe's side.

For the second time in their history Cork secured a fifth consecutive Munster title following a 7–12 to 1-4 trouncing of Limerick. O’Keeffe, however, did not take part in the game. For the second year in-a-row Cork later faced off against Kilkenny in the All-Ireland final. The game was a high-scoring affair with Cork winning by 5–10 to 3–13. The game, however, had to be replayed as Cork goalkeeper Daniel McCarthy was a British army reservist and Kilkenny's Matt Gargan had played with Waterford in the Munster championship. The game was another high-scoring one, with Jimmy Kelly scoring 5–2. A puck-out by Cork's Jamesy Kelleher is said to have hopped over the Kilkenny crossbar. Kilkenny won the game by 7–7 to 2–9, with all seven of their goals coming in a thirty-minute spell. It was the third time in five years that O’Keeffe had ended up on the losing side in an All-Ireland final.

Two years later in 1907 O’Keeffe finally picked up a third Munster winners’ medal following a 1–6 to 1–4 defeat of Tipperary. Cork later reached the All-Ireland final with Kilkenny providing the opposition. A high-scoring, but close, game developed between these two great rivals once again. As the game entered the final stage there was little to separate the two sides. Jimmy Kelly scored three first-half goals while Jack Anthony scored Kilkenny's winning point at the death. Cork went on two late goal hunts; however, the final score of 3–12 to 4-8 gave Kilkenny the win. It was O’Keeffe's last All-Ireland final appearance.

== Sources ==
- Corry, Eoghan, The GAA Book of Lists (Hodder Headline Ireland, 2005).
- Cronin, Jim, A Rebel Hundred: Cork's 100 All-Ireland Titles.
- Donegan, Des, The Complete Handbook of Gaelic Games (DBA Publications Limited, 2005).
