= 1932 Cork Senior Hurling Championship =

Annual hurling competition season

- Dates: 10 April 1932 – 2 October 1932
- Teams: 15
- Champions: St. Finbarr's (9th title); Johnny Kenneally (captain)
- Runners-up: Carrigtwohill

Tournament statistics
- Matches played: 15
- Goals scored: 92 (6.13 per match)
- Points scored: 95 (6.33 per match)

The 1932 Cork Senior Hurling Championship was the 44th staging of the Cork Senior Hurling Championship since its establishment by the Cork County Board in 1887. The draw for the opening round fixtures took place at the Cork Convention on 31 January 1932. The championship began on 10 April 1932 and ended on 2 October 1932.

Blackrock were the defending champions, however, they were defeated by St. Finbarr's at the semi-final stage.

On 2 October 1932, St. Finbarr's won the championship following a 5–3 to 4–4 defeat of Carrigtwohill in the final. This was their 9th championship title overall and their first title in six championship seasons.

== Team changes ==
=== To Championship ===
Promoted from the Cork Intermediate Hurling Championship

- Ballyhea

=== From Championship ===
Regraded to the Cork Intermediate Hurling Championship

- Midleton

== Results ==
=== First round ===
10 April 1932 First round	Ballyhea	3-00 - 5-00	Passage West	Buttevant Sportsfield, Buttevant

17 April 1932 First round	Sarsfields	4-01 - 3-04	Carrigtwohill	Cork Athletic Grounds, Cork
				Referee: E Coughlan (Blackrock)

24 April 1932 First round	Glen Rovers	5-06 - 4-01	Éire Óg	The Mardyke, Cork

1 May 1932 First round	Nemo Rangers	1-01 - 2-07	St. Finbarr's	Cork Athletic Grounds, Cork
				Referee: S Óg Murphy (Blackrock)

8 May 1932 First round	Blackrock	5-07 - 1-02	St. Anne's	The Mardyke, Cork

8 May 1932 First round	Ballincollig	1-02 - 3-03	Fr. Mathew Hall	The Mardyke, Cork

29 May 1932 First round	Mallow	7-05 - 3-04	University College Cork	St. Patrick's Athletic Grounds, Fermoy

19 June 1932 First round replay	Sarsfields	2-02 - 2-03	Carrigtwohill	Cork Athletic Grounds, Cork
				Referee: E Coughlan (Blackrock)

=== Second round ===
22 May 1932 Second round	Redmonds	1-04 - 6-03	Passage West	The Mardyke, Cork

24 July 1932 Second round	St. Finbarr's	3-07 - 1-02	Fr. Mathew Hall	The Mardyke, Cork

24 July 1932 Second round	Mallow	2-03 - 4-02	Blackrock	Buttevant Sportsfield, Buttevant

7 August 1932 Second round	Glen Rovers	1-02 - 2-00	Carrigtwohill	The Mardyke, Cork

=== Semi-finals ===
4 September 1932 Semi-final	Carrigtwohill	5-07 - 2-02	Passage West	Cork Athletic Grounds, Cork

11 September 1932 Semi-final	St. Finbarr's	3-06 - 2-02	Blackrock	The Mardyke, Cork

=== Final ===
2 October 1932 Final	St. Finbarr's	5-03 - 4-04	Carrigtwohill	Cork Athletic Grounds, Cork
				Referee: S Óg Murphy (Cork Co. Board)

== Championship statistics ==
=== Miscellaneous ===
- Carrigtwohill qualify for the final for the first time since 1918.
