= 1941 Cork Junior Hurling Championship =

Irish hurling competition

- Teams: 7
- Champions: Carrigtwohill (2nd title); Jackie O'Keeffe (captain)
- Runners-up: Mayfield

The 1941 Cork Junior Hurling Championship was the 44th staging of the Cork Junior Hurling Championship since its establishment by the Cork County Board.

On 30 November 1941, Carrigtwohill won the championship following a 5-01 to 2-00 defeat of Mayfield in the final at Riverstown Sportsfield. This was their second championship title overall and a first title since 1915.

== Results ==
=== Final ===
30 November 1941 Final	Carrigtwohill	5-01 - 2-00	Mayfield	Riverstown Sportsfield
