= 1900 Cork Junior Hurling Championship =

Irish hurling competition

- Champions: Redmonds (1st title)

The 1900 Cork Junior Hurling Championship was the sixth staging of the Cork Junior Hurling Championship since its establishment by the Cork County Board in 1895.

Redmonds won the championship title for the fourth consecutive time.
