= Frank Wall (hurler) =

Irish hurler

Personal information
- Native name: Prionsias de Bhál (Irish)
- Born: County Kilkenny, Ireland

Sport
- Sport: Hurling
Inter-county
- Years: County
- 1920s: Dublin
Inter-county titles
- Leinster titles: 1
- All-Irelands: 1

Frank Wall was an Irish hurler, most notable for captaining the winning Dublin team that won the 1924 All-Ireland Senior Hurling Championship.

A native of Freshford, County Kilkenny, he uniquely did not actually play in the final, having lost his place on the team. He emigrated to Australia in 1926 but returned to Ireland and purchased a Drapery shop in his native Kilkenny in 1937.

Dublin were represented in that 1924 All-Ireland SHC Final by the Kickhams club. Funded in 1885, they were named after noted Tipperary Fenian, Charles Joseph Kickham, who wrote 'Knocknagow' and 'Slievenamon'.

The club was established by Dublin drapery workers, mainly from Tipperary. Kickhams father owned a large drapery store in Mullinahone. Kickhams won All Ireland hurling titles (representing Dublin) in 1889 & 1924 and football titles 1887, 1905 and 1906.

They played mainly in Civil Service grounds, Islandbridge, and their meeting place was Drapers Union Rooms, Parnell Square.

- Dublin's route to the 1924 All-Ireland SHC success was as follows.
- 4/5/1924 Dublin(Kickhams) 3:4 Kilkenny 1:3 (Portlaoise)
- 26/10/1924: Final Dublin 4:4 Offaly 3:1 (Croke Park)
- All-Irl semi final: 9/11/1924: Dublin 8:4 Antrim 3:1 (Croke Park)
- Final: 14/12/1924: Dublin 5:3 Galway 2:6 (Croke Park) Attendance 9,000
