= 1899 Cork Junior Hurling Championship =

Irish hurling competition

- Champions: Redmonds (2nd title)
- Runners-up: Blackrock

The 1899 Cork Junior Hurling Championship was the fifth staging of the Cork Junior Hurling Championship since its establishment by the Cork County Board in 1895.

The final was played on 5 November 1899 at the Park in Cork, between Redmonds and Blackrock, in what was their first ever meeting in the final. Redmonds won the match by 6-01 to 5-02 to claim their third championship title in succession.

== Results ==
=== Final ===
5 November 1899 Final	Redmonds	6-01 - 5-02	Blackrock	Cork Park
