= 1942 Cork Senior Hurling Championship =

Annual hurling competition season

- Dates: 19 April – 4 October 1942
- Teams: 11
- Champions: St. Finbarr's (11th title)
- Runners-up: Ballincollig; Willie Murphy (captain)

Tournament statistics
- Matches played: 10
- Goals scored: 76 (7.6 per match)
- Points scored: 96 (9.6 per match)

The 1942 Cork Senior Hurling Championship was the 54th staging of the Cork Senior Hurling Championship since its establishment by the Cork County Board in 1887. The draw for the opening round fixtures took place at the Cork Convention on 25 January 1942. The championship began on 19 April 1942 and ended on 4 October 1942.

Glen Rovers entered the championship as the defending champions and were in search of a ninth successive title, however, they were beaten by Ballincollig in the semi-final.

The final was played on 4 October 1942 at the Athletic Grounds in Cork, between St. Finbarr's and Ballincollig, in what was their first ever meeting in the final. St. Finbarr's won the match by 5–07 to 2–02 to claim their 11th championship title overall and a first title in nine years.

== Team changes ==
=== To Championship ===
Promoted from the Cork Intermediate Hurling Championship

- Cloughduv

=== From Championship ===
Regraded to the Cork Intermediate Hurling Championship

- Mallow

Declined to field a team

- Carbery

== Results ==
=== First round ===
19 April 1942 First round	Muskerry	4-03 - 5-08	Avondhu	Cork Athletic Grounds

26 April 1942 First round	Carrigdhoun	3-03 - 4-10	St. Finbarr's	The Mardyke

3 May 1942 First round	Cloughduv	3-03 - 4-07	Imokilly	The Mardyke

10 May 1942 First round	Seandún	2-01 - 6-06	Ballincollig	The Mardyke

17 May 1942 First round	Glen Rovers	3-08 - 3-01	Sarsfields	Cork Athletic Grounds
	Twomey 2-0, J Lynch 1-2, C Ring 0-3, J Buckley 0-2, J Coughlan 0-1.		M Brennan 1-1, Slattery 1-0.

- Blackrock received a bye in this round.

=== Second round ===
24 May 1942 Second round	Blackrock	1-01 - 5-07	St. Finbarr's	Cork Athletic Grounds

31 May 1942 Second round	Avondhu	5-06 - 4-03	Imokilly	Midleton Sportsfield

- Ballincollig and Glen Rovers received byes in this round.

=== Semi-finals ===
2 August 1942 Semi-final	St. Finbarr's	10-06 - 1-02	Avondhu	Cork Athletic Grounds

20 September 1942 Semi-final	Ballincollig	5-04 - 1-08	Glen Rovers	Cork Athletic Grounds
	Burrows 1-2, M O'Connor 1-1, Larkin 1-1, V Lynch 1-0, D O'Mahony 1-0.		J Buckley 1-2, J Lynch 0-1, Barry 0-1, Moylan 0-1, C Ring 0-1, McSweeney 0-1, D Coughlan 0-1.

=== Final ===
4 October 1942 Final	St. Finbarr's	5-07 - 2-02	Ballincollig	Cork Athletic Grounds
	D Beckett 1-3, D McCarthy 2-0, BT O'Sullivan 1-0, W Beckett 1-0, Murphy 0-2, S Condon 0-1, M Murphy 0-1.		W Murphy 1-0, Larkin 1-0, V Lynch 0-1, O'Connor 0-1.	Attendance: 18,500

== Championship statistics ==
=== Miscellaneous ===
- On 20 September 1942, Glen Rovers suffered their first championship defeat since 21 May 1933.
- St Finbarr's win their first title since 1933.
