= 1898 Cork Junior Hurling Championship =

Irish hurling competition

- Champions: Redmonds (2nd title)
- Runners-up: Blarney

The 1898 Cork Junior Hurling Championship was the fourth staging of the Cork Junior Hurling Championship since its establishment by the Cork County Board in 1895.

The final was played on 18 September 1898 at the Park in Cork, between Redmonds and Blarney, in what was their first ever meeting in the final. Redmonds won the match by 6-02 to 2-05 to claim their second championship title in succession.

== Results ==
=== Final ===
18 September 1898 Final	Redmonds	6-02 - 2-05	Blarney	Cork Park
