= Matty Fouhy =

Irish hurler

Personal information
- Native name: Maitiú Ó Fuathaigh (Irish)
- Nickname: Matty
- Born: 14 April 1923 Midleton, County Cork, Ireland
- Died: 27 April 1977 (aged 54) Cork, Ireland
- Occupation: ESB inspector
- Height: 5 ft 10 in (178 cm)

Sport
- Sport: Hurling
- Position: Right wing-back
Club
- Years: Club
- 1941-1962: Carrigtwohill
Club titles
- Cork titles: 0
Inter-county*
Years	County	Apps (scores)
1944-1957	Cork	24 (2-6)
Inter-county titles
- Munster titles: 6
- All-Irelands: 4
- NHL: 1
- *Inter County team apps and scores correct as of 17:56, 6 April 2015.

Matthew "Matty" Fouhy (14 April 1923 — 27 April 1977) was an Irish hurler who played as a right wing-back for the Cork senior team.

Born in Midleton, County Cork, Fouhy first played competitive hurling during his schooling at Midleton CBS. He arrived on the inter-county scene at the age of seventeen when he first linked up with the Cork minor team before later joining the junior side. He joined the senior panel during the 1944 championship. Fouhy subsequently became a regular member of the starting fifteen and won three All-Ireland medals, two Munster medals and one National Hurling League medal. He was an All-Ireland runner-up on one occasion.

As a member of the Munster inter-provincial team on a number of occasions, Fouhy won four Railway Cup medals. At club level Fouhy enjoyed a twenty-year career with Carrigtwohill

Throughout his career Fouhy made 24 championship appearances. He retired from inter-county hurling following the conclusion of the 1957 championship.

== Playing career ==
=== Club ===
Fouhy played his club hurling with his local club in Carrigtwohill and enjoyed some success. His major moments of victory came in 1949 and 1950 when Carrigtwohill captured back-to-back county intermediate championship titles.

=== Minor ===
Fouhy first played for Cork as a member of the minor team in 1941. He was an unused substitute that year as Cork claimed the All-Ireland title after a 3-11 to 1-1 defeat of Galway while also claiming a delayed Munster title following a 4-6 to 3-3 defeat of Tipperary.

=== Senior ===
==== Beginnings ====
In 1944 Fouhy joined a Cork senior team on the brink of history as they aimed to capture a fourth All-Ireland title in-a-row. On 3 September 1944 Fouhy was a member of the substitutes as Cork faced Dublin in the All-Ireland decider. Joe Kelly was the hero of the day and he contributed greatly to Cork's 2-13 to 1-2 victory. In spite of playing no part in the game Fouhy still collected an All-Ireland medal.

Fouhy was suspended from the Cork senior team in 1946 after lining out illegally in a club game in Waterford. It was a move which cost him an All-Ireland medal. During this period he spent two unsuccessful years with the Cork junior team.

On 29 June 1947 Fouhy made his senior championship debut when he came on as a substitute in Cork's 3-10 to 1-5 Munster semi-final defeat of Waterford. He remained on the substitutes' bench for the subsequent All-Ireland decider against Kilkenny on 7 September 1947. A last-minute point from Terry Leahy resulted in a 0-14 to 2-7 defeat for Cork.

==== Three-in-a-row ====
After a period in the wilderness Cork bounced back in 1952 with Fouhy as a regular member of the team. After missing much of Cork's provincial campaign, he was back at right wing-back on 6 September 1952 as Cork faced Dublin in the All-Ireland decider. In spite of only leading by three points at half-time Cork eventually won by 2-14 to 0-7 and Fouhy picked up a first All-Ireland medal on the field of play.

Fouhy won a National Hurling League medal in 1953 following a 2-10 to 2-7 defeat of Tipperary. He later collected his first Munster medal on the field of play following a 3-10 to 1-11 defeat of Tipperary. On 6 September 1953 Cork faced Galway in the All-Ireland final. The game itself is remembered as one of the ugliest championship deciders ever and is clouded in controversy due to the injury to the Galway captain, Mick Burke. Cork won the game by 3-3 to 0-8, with Fouhy winning a second All-Ireland medal.

In 1954 Fouhy won a second Munster medal on the field of play as old rivals Tipperary were bested by 2-8 to 1-8. A record crowd of 84,856 attended the subsequent All-Ireland decider on 5 September 1954 with Wexford providing the opposition. Wexford had a four-point lead with seventeen minutes left to play, however, history was against the new team of the decade when Johnny Clifford scored the winning goal for Cork with just four minutes left. A narrow 1-9 to 1-6 victory secured a third successive All-Ireland for Cork and for Fouhy.

==== Decline ====
Four-in-a-row proved beyond Cork, however, the team returned for one last hurrah in 1956. After missing much of the team's successful provincial campaign, Fouhy was restored to the starting fifteen for the All-Ireland showdown with Wexford on 23 September 1956. The game has gone down in history as one of the all-time classics as Christy Ring was bidding for a record ninth All-Ireland medal. The game turned on one important incident as the Wexford goalkeeper, Art Foley, made a miraculous save from a Ring shot and cleared the sliotar up the field to set up another attack. Nicky Rackard scored a crucial goal with two minutes to go giving Wexford a 2-14 to 2-8 victory.

Fouhy retired from inter-county hurling following Cork's defeat by Waterford in the 1957 Munster decider.

=== Inter-provincial ===
Fouhy also lined out with Munster in the inter-provincial hurling competition and enjoyed much success. He first lined out with his province in 1950. That year he picked up his first Railway Cup winners' medal as Munster triumphed over Leinster. It was the first of four Railway Cup titles in-a-row for Fouhy and for Munster. Munster were defeated by Leinster in 1954 as Fouhy hoped to make it five-in-a-row.

== Death ==
On 27 April 1977, Fouhy died aged 53 at St. Finbarr's Hospital in Cork after taking ill the previous day. After the news of his death, leading figures from the world of hurling paid tribute to him, with former teammate and incumbent GAA president Con Murphy described him as "a most accomplished and sporting hurler and one of nature's gentlemen." Fouhy was survived by his wife Dympna, two daughters and a son.
