= 1924 All-Ireland Senior Hurling Championship final =

1924 All-Ireland Senior Hurling Final
- Event: 1924 All-Ireland Senior Hurling Championship
Dublin	Galway
5-3	2-6
- Date: 14 December 1924
- Venue: Croke Park, Dublin
- Referee: Pádraig Ó Caoimh (Cork)
- Attendance: 9,000

The 1924 All-Ireland Senior Hurling Championship Final was the 37th All-Ireland Final and the culmination of the 1924 All-Ireland Senior Hurling Championship, an inter-county hurling tournament for the top teams in Ireland. The match was held at Croke Park, Dublin, on 14 December 1924, between Galway and Dublin. The Connacht men lost to the Leinster champions on a score line of 5–3 to 2–6. A booklet on Dublin's season titled ‘Dublin 1924: Match Reports from the Dublin’s All-Ireland Senior Hurling Championship win of 1924’, compiled by Marie Bennett, was published for charity in 2022.

== Match details ==
1924-12-14
Final

Dublin	5-3 – 2-6	Galway

Croke Park, Dublin
Attendance: 9,000
Referee: P. Ó Caoimh (Cork)

Dublin	Galway
