= Matt Hassett =

Irish hurler (1932–2025)

Personal information
- Native name: Maitiú Ó hAiseadha (Irish)
- Born: 1932 Toomevara, County Tipperary, Ireland
- Died: 2 April 2025 (aged 93)
- Occupation: Solicitor
- Height: 5 ft 8 in (173 cm)

Sport
- Sport: Hurling
- Position: Right corner-back
Club
- Years: Club
- Toomevara
Club titles
- Tipperary titles: 1
Inter-county*
Years	County	Apps (scores)
1960–1963	Tipperary	8 (0-00)
Inter-county titles
- Munster titles: 2
- All-Irelands: 1
- NHL: 1
- *Inter County team apps and scores correct as of 20:14, 8 May 2014.

Matthew Hassett (1932 – 2 April 2025) was an Irish hurler who played as a right corner-back for the Tipperary senior team.

Born in Toomevara, County Tipperary, Hassett first played competitive hurling during his schooling at the Patrician College, Ballyfin. He arrived on the inter-county scene at the age of twenty-seven when he first linked up with the Tipperary senior team. He made his senior debut in the 1960 championship. Hassett went on to play a brief role for Tipperary during a golden age for the team, and won one All-Ireland medal, two Munster medals and one National Hurling League medal. An All-Ireland runner-up on one occasion, Hassett also captained the team to All-Ireland victory in 1961.

At club level Hassett was a one-time championship medallist with Toomevara.

Throughout his inter-county career, Hassett made just 8 championship appearances for Tipperary. His retirement came as a result of injury following the conclusion of the 1963 championship.

In retirement from playing, Hassett became involved in team management and coaching. He served as a selector with the Tipperary minor and under-21 teams at various times.

== Biography ==
Matt Hassett was born in Toomevara, County Tipperary in 1932. The son of Pat and Nora Hassett (née O'Meara), he was born into an area and into a family that had a very strong hurling tradition. He was a neighbour of Stephen Hackett, winner of All-Ireland honours with Tipperary in 1925. Hassett's father was a first cousin of the famed Patrick ‘Wedger’ Meagher, who captained the Tipperary hurling team in the All-Ireland final of 1913. His mother's uncle, Jim O'Dywer, won an All-Ireland medal with Tipperary in the inaugural hurling championship in 1887. Hassett was educated at the local national school and later attended the Patrician College in Ballyfin, County Laois. Here he became a star on the college hurling team where he was noted as an excellent goal poacher when playing at full-forward.

Hassett later studied law at university and was a long-time partner in the Nenagh firm of solicitors of James O'Brien & Co. His son Mark now works in the same practice.

Hassett died on 2 April 2025, at the age of 93.

== Playing career ==
=== Club ===
Hassett played his club hurling with the famous Toomevara club. His first competitive games were as an under-15 player; however, he enjoyed little success. Hassett became secretary of the club in 1954; however, hurling was at a low ebb in the club. He began to organise the juvenile and minor teams and in 1956 Toomevara entered a team in the senior county championship. Four years later in 1960 this reorganization bore fruit as Hassett collected his sole senior county championship title.

Hassett also won three county football championship titles in 1958, 1959 and 1961.

=== Inter-county ===
Unlike many of his contemporaries Hassett did not come to prominence on the county minor team. Instead his inter-county career began by chance. In 1958 Hassett traveled as a spectator to Buttevant to see Cork take on Tipperary in a challenge game and ended up playing at corner-back. He played some other tournament games with Tipp, and in 1960 he was picked at right corner-back on Tipperary's championship fifteen.

In Hassett's first season on the team Tipp reached the provincial final and he was given the unenviable task of marking Cork's Christy Ring. In one of the toughest games of hurling ever-played Hassett succeeded in holding Ring to just three points; while Tipp went on to win the game by 4-13 to 4-11. It was his first Munster title. The subsequent All-Ireland final pitted Tipperary against Wexford. Tipperary displayed a certain amount of over-confidence going into the match and Wexford pounced at the beginning of each half with two goals by Mick Hassett and Oliver McGrath. The crowd invaded the pitch with a minute to go, mistaking the final whistle, and when the disorder was cleared Tipperary continued playing with twelve men. It mattered little as Wexford were the All-Ireland champions by 2-15 to 0-11.

In 1961 Hassett was appointed captain of the team as Tipp set out to make amends for the All-Ireland final defeat. The year began well with Hassett leading his team to a National Hurling League title. He later lined out in a second Munster final. Once again it was Cork who provided the opposition, however, Tipp steamrolled their greatest rivals by 3-6 to 0-7. It was Hassett's second Munster title. Tipperary later lined out in the All-Ireland final for the second year in-a-row. Dublin were the opponents on that occasion, however, a certain amount of overconfidence had crept into the side once again. The game was nip and tuck for much of the hour and ‘the Dubs’ led by two points with thirteen minutes left. Jimmy Doyle was Tipp's hero as he scored nine points to give Tipp a 0-16 to 1-12 victory. The victory gave Hassett an All-Ireland winners’ medal.

In 1962 Hassett's inter-county career came to an abrupt halt when he broke and severely damaged his finger in a game against Limerick. The injury confined him to the subs bench, and effectively ended his career.

Sporting positions
Preceded by Tony Wall	Tipperary Senior Hurling Captain; 1961	Succeeded by Jimmy Doyle
Achievements
Preceded by Nick O'Donnell (Wexford)	All-Ireland Senior Hurling winning captain 1961	Succeeded by Jimmy Doyle (Tipperary)
