= Bill Fitzgibbon =

Irish hurler (1878–1955)

William Fitzgibbon
Personal information
- Nickname: Billy
- Born: 23 May 1878 Carrigtwohill, County Cork, Ireland
- Died: 20 May 1955 (aged 76) St. Finbarr's Hospital, Cork, Ireland
- Occupation: Labourer

Sport
- Sport: Hurling
- Position: Forward
Club
- Years: Club
- Carrigtwohill
Club titles
- Cork titles: 0
Inter-county
Years	County	Apps (scores)
1900-1902	Cork	4
Inter-county titles
- Munster titles: 0
- All-Irelands: 1

William Fitzgibbon (23 May 1878 – 20 May 1955) was an Irish hurler who played as a forward with the Cork senior hurling team. He was an All-Ireland Championship winner in 1902.

== Career ==
Fitzgibbon began his hurling career at club level with Carrigtwohill in East Cork. He enjoyed a lengthy career with the club, however, he never won a Cork Senior Championship title.

At inter-county level, Fitzgibbon first played for the Cork senior hurling team on 3 November 1901 in what was the delayed 1900 championship. Two years later he won an All-Ireland Championship medal after a 3–13 to no score defeat of London at the Cork Athletic Grounds.

Fitzgibbon died at St. Finbarr's Hospital on 20 May 1955.

== Honours ==
Cork

- All-Ireland Senior Hurling Championship (1): 1902
