= 1915 Cork Junior Hurling Championship =

Irish hurling competition

- Champions: Carrigtwohill (1st title); John Mulcahy (captain)
- Runners-up: Knockavilla

The 1915 Cork Junior Hurling Championship was the 21st staging of the Cork Junior Hurling Championship since its establishment by the Cork County Board.

On 12 December 1915, Carrigtwohill won the championship following a 1-02 to 1-00 defeat of Knockavilla in the final at the Cork Athletic Grounds. This was their first ever championship title.

== Results ==
=== Final ===
12 December 1915 Final	Carrigtwohill	1-02 - 1-00	Knockavilla	Cork Athletic Grounds
