= Kennedy Park (Cork, Ireland) =

Park in Cork, Ireland

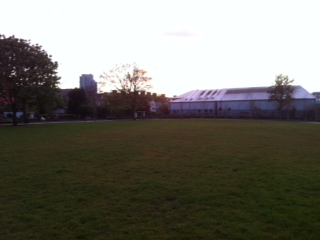
- Kennedy Park with The Elysian in the background
- Interactive map of Kennedy Park
- Type: Public
- Location: Cork, Ireland
- Coordinates: 51°53′42″N 8°27′18″W
- Area: 7.5 acres (3.0 ha)

Kennedy Park is a local park in Cork, Ireland, named after US president John F. Kennedy who visited the area in June 1963. The 7.5-acre park is situated between Victoria Road and Monahan Road.

== Sports ==
The park is associated with a number of sporting clubs. During the club's infancy, the park was the homestead of Nemo Rangers GAA club. More recently it has been used as the training base for the Cork Admirals American Football team. The park is also used for training by several amateur soccer sides, as well as tag rugby teams.

== Development ==
Plaque marking 2012 improvements

In the mid-2000s, at the height of the Celtic Tiger, the future of the park was cast in doubt after plans were unveiled to reduce the size of the park to allow for a new road to be constructed in conjunction with the Cork Docklands Development. This resulted in a petition by local residents and by the sporting clubs that used the park. The Cork Docklands developments, however, were ultimately halted due to economic constraints and the planned changes were not implemented.

In 2012, as marked by a contemporary plaque, a number of improvements and developments to the park were unveiled - including a new walkway and planting. Funding was reportedly confirmed for additional improvements during 2018.
