= Jimmy Kennedy (hurler, born 1891) =

Irish hurler

Personal information
- Native name: Séamus Ó Cinnéide (Irish)
- Nickname: Major
- Born: 16 April 1891 Carrigtwohill, County Cork, Ireland
- Died: 13 August 1973 (aged 82) Carrigtwohill, County Cork, Ireland
- Occupation: General labourer

Sport
- Sport: Hurling
- Position: Full-forward
Club
- Years: Club
- 1908-1928: Carrigtwohill
Club titles
- Cork titles: 1
Inter-county
Years	County	Apps (scores)
1912-1927	Cork	26 (42-5)
Inter-county titles
- Munster titles: 6
- All-Irelands: 2
- NHL: 0

James Kennedy (16 April 1891 – 13 August 1973) was an Irish hurler who played as a full-forward for the Cork senior team.

Raised in Carrigtwohill, County Cork, Kennedy was one of fourteen children born to Michael and Norah Kennedy (née Reed). The son of a victualler, he was educated locally and later worked as a labourer.

Kennedy first played competitive hurling as a member of the Carrigtowhill club. He won a Cork Senior Hurling Championship medal in 1918.

Kennedy first appeared on the inter-county scene at the age of twenty-one when he was selected for the Cork team. He made his debut during the 1912 championship. Over the course of the following fifteen years, Kennedy won two All-Ireland medals, the first as captain of the team in 1919 followed by a second as a non-playing substitute in 1926. A four-time All-Ireland runner-up, he also won six Munster medals. He lined out for Cork for the last time in September 1927.

== Playing career ==
=== Club ===
Kennedy played his club hurling with his local club in Carrigtwohill club. He won a senior county championship winners' medal with 'Carrig' in 1918. This remained the club's only senior county title until 2011.

=== Inter-county ===
Kennedy first came to prominence on the inter-county scene as a member of the Cork senior hurling team in 1912. That year he won his first Munster winners' medal following a victory over Tipperary in the provincial final. Because of a delay in the championship the 5-1 to 3-1 Munster final victory allowed Cork to advance to the All-Ireland final. Arch-rivals Kilkenny provided the opposition in that game. Sim Walton was the goal-scoring hero as 'the Cats' secured a narrow 2-1 to 1-3 victory and Kennedy ended up on the losing side.

After losing out in the provincial series for the next few seasons Cork were back in 1915. That year Kennedy picked up a second Munster title following an 8-2 to 2-1 trouncing of Clare. The subsequent All-Ireland final pitted Cork against Laois. It was their first ever meeting in the history of the championship, with Cork going into the game as the red-hot favourites. Cork led by 3-0 to 2-2 at half-time, however, a huge downpour stymied their style of play. With nine minutes left in the game John Carroll scored the winning goal for Laois. It was the second time that Kennedy had ended up on the losing side on All-Ireland final day.

After a period in the wilderness Cork bounced back in 1919 with Kennedy serving as captain of the team. That year he captured a third Munster winners' medal following a provincial final defeat of Limerick. The All-Ireland final saw Cork line out against Dublin. 'The Rebels' were coasting at half-time with Kennedy havings scored four goals. He had two more disallowed to give his side a 4-2 to 1-1 lead. Cork ploughed on in the second-half to secure a 6-4 to 2-4 victory. This victory gave Kennedy an All-Ireland winners' medal. This was also the first occasion that Cork wore their distinctive red jerseys. The old saffron and blue jerseys had been seized by the British before the game so alternative arrangements had to be made.

In 1920 Kennedy won a fourth and final Munster title following another victory over Limerick. A fourth All-Ireland final appearance beckoned, however, Cork failed to retain their title. A goal blitz by Joe Phelan, Jimmy Walsh and Mick Neville gave Dublin a 4-9 to 4-3 victory. This defeat brought Kennedy's inter-county career to an end.

== Honours ==
Carrigtwohill

- Cork Senior Hurling Championship (1): 1918

Cork

- All-Ireland Senior Hurling Championship (2): 1919 (c), 1926
- Munster Senior Hurling Championship (6): 1912, 1915, 1919 (c), 1920, 1926, 1927

Sporting positions
Preceded by	Cork Senior Hurling Captain; 1919	Succeeded by Dick O'Gorman
Achievements
Preceded by Willie Hough	All-Ireland Senior Hurling Final winning captain 1919	Succeeded by Bob Mockler
