= 1927 All-Ireland Senior Hurling Championship final =

1927 All-Ireland Senior Hurling Final
- Event: 1927 All-Ireland Senior Hurling Championship
| Dublin | Cork |
| 4-8 | 1-3 |
- Date: 4 September 1927
- Venue: Croke Park, Dublin
- Referee: Dinny Lanigan (Limerick)
- Attendance: 23,824

The 1927 All-Ireland Senior Hurling Championship Final was the 40th All-Ireland Final and the culmination of the 1927 All-Ireland Senior Hurling Championship, an inter-county hurling tournament for the top teams in Ireland. The match was held at Croke Park, Dublin, on 4 September 1927, between Cork and Dublin. The Munster champions lost to their Leinster opponents on a score line of 4–8 to 1–3.

== Match details ==
1927-09-04

| Dublin | 4-8 – 1-3 | Cork |

Croke Park, Dublin
Attendance: 23,824
Referee: D. Lanigan (Limerick)

| Dublin | Cork |
