= Springfield Celts Rugby Club =

Springfield Celts Rugby Football Club
- Union: Illinois Union
- Founded: 1975
- Ground(s): Kennedy Park, Springfield, Illinois, United States
- President: Brandon Wood
- Coach(es): (United States) Jim Morrison, (United States) Nick Capranica
- League(s): Division III

The Springfield Celts Rugby Club is a Division III rugby union team based in Springfield, Illinois, United States and is currently in the Illinois Union.

== History ==
The Springfield Celts Rugby Club was established in 1975. Over the years the Celts have created a tradition of hard hitting rugby often taking the best of teams out of their game plan. This tradition has produced several tournament trophies and union victories. The legend of the "Green Jersey" has haunted the Midwestern region for many years. The young players hear of the stories of destruction and victory and continue to wear the Green Jersey with pride.
