= 1892 All-Ireland Senior Hurling Championship =

Championship details
- Dates: 30 October 1892 – 26 March 1893
- Teams: 3

All-Ireland champions
- Winning team: Cork (2nd win)
- Captain: Bill O'Callaghan

All-Ireland Finalists
- Losing team: Dublin
- Captain: Pat Egan

Provincial champions
- Munster: Cork
- Leinster: Dublin
- Ulster: Not Played
- Connacht: Not Played

Championship statistics
- No. matches played: 2
- Goals total: 10 (5.00 per game)
- Points total: 16 (8.00 per game)
- All-Star Team: See here

The 1892 All-Ireland Senior Hurling Championship was the sixth staging of the All-Ireland Senior Hurling Championship, the Gaelic Athletic Association's premier inter-county hurling tournament. The championship ran from 30 October 1892 to 26 March 1893.

Kerry were the defending champions, however, they were beaten by Cork in the Munster final.

The All-Ireland final was played on 26 March 1893 at Clonturk Park in Dublin, between Cork and Dublin, in what was their first ever meeting in the All-Ireland final. Cork won the match by 2–03 to 1–05 to become the first team to win a second title.

== Rule changes ==
At the Gaelic Athletic Association's (GAA) annual congress held in Thurles on 13 January 1892, some changes were made to the existing rules of the game. Firstly, a goal was made equal to five points. Secondly, teams were reduced from twenty-one to seventeen players. Perhaps most importantly of all, it was also decided that county champions, when representing the county, were allowed to select players from other clubs within the county.

== Participating teams ==
County	Club	Most recent success	
County	Club	All-Ireland	Provincial
Cork	Redmonds	1890	1890
Dublin	Davitt–Faughs	1889	1889
Kerry	Kilmoyley	1891	1891

== Munster Senior Hurling Championship ==
=== Munster final ===
30 October 1892 Final	Kerry (Kilmoyley)	2–05 – 5–03	Cork (Redmonds)	Killarney Grounds
				Attendance: 10,000

== All-Ireland Senior Hurling Championship ==
=== All-Ireland inal ===
26 March 1893 Final	Cork (Redmonds)	2–3 – 1–5	Dublin (Davitt–Faughs)	Clonturk Park
				Attendance: 5,000; Referee: D Fraher (Waterford)

== Championship statistics ==
=== Miscellaneous ===
- The All-Ireland final ended in disarray when the Dublin players walked off with five minutes left in the match following a dispute over a goal.

== Sources ==
- Corry, Eoghan, The GAA Book of Lists (Hodder Headline Ireland, 2005).
- Donegan, Des, The Complete Handbook of Gaelic Games (DBA Publications Limited, 2005).
