= Johnny Kenneally =

Irish hurler from Cork

Personal information
- Native name: Seán Ó Cinnaolaidh (Irish)
- Born: 18 June 1898 Abbey Street, Cork, Ireland
- Died: 19 January 1957 (aged 58) North Infirmary, Cork, Ireland
- Occupation: Van driver

Sport
- Sport: Hurling
- Position: Full-forward
Club
- Years: Club
- St Finbarr's
Club titles
- Cork titles: 2
Inter-county
Years	County	Apps (scores)
1929-1937	Cork	9 (4-04)
Inter-county titles
- Munster titles: 2
- All-Irelands: 2
- NHL: 0

John Kenneally (18 June 1898 – 19 January 1957) was an Irish hurler who played as a full-forward for the Cork county team.

Born in Cork, Kenneally first arrived on the inter-county scene when he first linked up with the Cork minor team. He made his senior debut during the 1929 championship. Kenneally later became a regular member of the starting fifteen, and won one All-Ireland medals and two Munster medals on the field of play.

As a member of the Munster inter-provincial team on a number of occasions, Kenneally won one Railway Cup medal. At club level he was a two-time championship medallist with St Finbarr's.

His brother, Miah Kenneally, also played for Cork while his sister, Mary Kenneally, was an All-Ireland medallist with the Cork senior camogie team.

Throughout his career Kenneally made nine championship appearances. He retired from inter-county hurling following the conclusion of the 1937 championship.

== Hurling career ==
=== Club ===
In 1932 Kenneally was captain of the St Finbarr's senior hurling team reached the championship decider. Carrigtwohill provided the opposition; however, the Barr's played with a strong wind in the first half and were 2-1 ahead before Carrig's first score. St Finbarr's built up a considerable lead at the interval and got another soft goal in the opening minutes of the second half, to lead by fourteen points. For the rest of the match though Carrig fought back. In spite of this, a narrow 5-3 to 4-4 score line secured the title for St Finbarr's and a first championship medal for Kenneally.

Both Kenneally's side and Carrigtwohill met in the county final again in 1933. An eventful game produced a draw. The replay saw St Finbarr's make no mistake. After taking an early lead they powered to a 6-6 to 5-0 victory. It was Kenneally's second championship medal as captain.

=== Inter-county ===
Kenneally first played for Cork as a member of the minor team in 1928. He won a Munster medal during that campaign as Cork defeated Waterford by 3-4 to 3-2. As the All-Ireland series was delayed by a year, Kenneally was withdrawn from the minor team by the senior selectors.

On 11 August 1929 Kenneally made his senior championship debut. The 4-6 to 2-3 defeat of Waterford gave him a Munster medal. On 1 September 1929 Cork faced Galway in the All-Ireland final for the second successive year. Little had changed in a year as Cork were on the top of their game again. A rout ensued as "the Rebels" and Kenneally, who came on as a sub, claimed the All-Ireland title following a 4-9 to 1-3 victory.

Kenneally was confined to the substitutes' bench for much of the 1931 championship campaign. He won a second Munster medal that year following a 5-4 to 1-2 defeat of Waterford in a replay. Kenneally later collected a second All-Ireland medal as a substitute as Cork secured the title following a three-game saga with Kilkenny.

=== Inter-provincial ===
Kenneally was selected for duty with Munster in the inter-provincial championship in 1934. Reigning champions Leinster were the opponents and a high-scoring game developed. A 6-3 to 3-2 2 victory gave Kenneally a Railway Cup medal.

== Death ==
On 19 January 1977, John died from a brain injury sustained in a hurling match in Blackrock, some 40 years earlier. He died in Saint Anne's asylum in Shnakiel Cork city.

== Honours ==
St Finbarr's

- Cork Senior Hurling Championship (2): 1932 (c), 1933 (c)

Cork

- All-Ireland Senior Hurling Championship (2): 1929, 1931 (sub)
- Munster Senior Hurling Championship (2): 1929, 1931
- Munster Minor Hurling Championship (1): 1928

Munster

- Railway Cup (1): 1934
