= 1949 Cork Intermediate Hurling Championship =

Irish hurling competition

- Dates: 3 April – 11 September 1949
- Teams: 9
- Champions: Carrigtwohill (2nd title); S. Twomey (captain)
- Runners-up: Newtownshandrum; D. Lyons (captain)

Tournament statistics
- Matches played: 8
- Goals scored: 62 (7.75 per match)
- Points scored: 77 (9.63 per match)

The 1949 Cork Intermediate Hurling Championship was the 40th staging of the Cork Intermediate Hurling Championship since its establishment by the Cork County Board in 1909. The draw for the first round fixtures took place on 30 January 1949. The championship ran from 3 April to 11 September 1949.

The final was played on 11 September 1949 at the Athletic Grounds in Cork, between Carrigtwohill and Newtownshandrum, in what was their first ever meeting in the final. Carrigtwohill won the match by 3–10 to 3–05 to claim their second championship title overall and their first championship title in 40 years.

== Results ==
=== First round ===
3 April 1949 First round	Carrigtwohill	4-07 - 4-04	Carrigaline	Cork Athletic Grounds

3 April 1949 First round	Ballincollig	4-02 - 1-04	Shanballymore	Cork Athletic Grounds

8 May 1949 First round	Nemo Rangers	4-03 - 4-04	Buttevant	Mallow Grounds

15 May 1949 First round	Midleton	6-03 - 7-07	Kildorrery	Fermoy Grounds

- Newtownshandrum received a bye in this round.

=== Second round ===
14 August 1949 Second round	Newtownshandrum	4-06 - 2-06	Ballincollig	Buttevant Grounds

- Buttevant, Carrigtwohill and Kildorrery received byes in this round.

=== Semi-finals ===
7 August 1949 Semi-final	Carrigtwohill	7-07 - 2-02	Buttevant	Cork Athletic Grounds

28 August 1949 Semi-final	Kildorrery	2-04 - 5-03	Newtownshandrum	Buttevant Grounds

=== Final ===
11 September 1949 Final	Carrigtwohill	3-10 - 3-05	Newtownshandrum	Cork Athletic Grounds
