= Ballyphehane =

Suburb of Cork city, Ireland

Ballyphehane Baile Féithéan
- Suburb
- Location in Ireland
- Coordinates: 51°52′57″N 8°28′42″W
- Country: Ireland
- Province: Munster
- Administrative area: Cork (city)
- Time zone: UTC+0 (WET)
  - Summer (DST): UTC-1 (IST (WEST))

Ballyphehane (Irish: Baile Féitheáin) is a suburb in the south of Cork in Ireland. It is one of the oldest suburbs in Cork and was created as part of a post-World War II initiative to create a model community in Cork. Between 1948 and 1993, a total of 11 housing schemes totalling 1,316 dwellings were built by Cork Corporation, now known as Cork City Council. Many of the main roads in Ballyphehane are named after the executed leaders of the 1916 Rising.

The electoral divisions of Ballyphehane A and Ballyphehane B have a combined population of over 1400 people.

== Location ==
Ballyphehane is around 2 km south of the city centre. It is bordered by the Lough Parish, South Parish, Douglas/Frankfield, and Turners Cross. The Tramore river flows through the parish. The Church of the Assumption is the Catholic church in the parish.

Ballyphehane is served by Bus Éireann routes 203 (to Farranree via the city centre) and 219 (Mahon to CIT).

== Notable buildings ==
Ballyphehane Community Centre's facilities include a sports hall, meeting rooms, gym and a number of playing fields which play host to the local soccer team Killreen Celtic.

Adjacent to the Community Centre is the Tory Top Road public library, which was opened in 2005 replacing the previous library which had served the local community since 1974. The library is owned and operated by Cork City Council.

Musgrave Park in Ballyphehane is home to Dolphin and Sunday's Well rugby teams, and it is also one of the two homes of Munster Rugby, the other being Thomond Park in Limerick.

The local Scout troop is the 2nd Cork Ballyphehane Scouting Ireland, which meets on Doyle Road, not to be confused with the 2nd Cork troop based in St. Fin Barre's Cathedral parish.

== Schools ==
There are several schools in the area. Maria Assumpta Girls' National School and the Presentation Secondary School, run by the Presentation Sisters, caters for the girls of the area. Réalt na Maidine National School is a local national (primary) school for boys. A co-educational Gaelscoil, Gaelscoil an Teaghlaigh Naofa, is also located near Ballyphehane Community Centre. Coláiste Éamann Rís, formerly Deerpark Christian Brothers school, is a co-educational secondary school. Formerly an all-boys school, it began accepting girls in 2019 and is run by the Edmund Rice School Trust (ERST). It was founded by the Christian Brothers on Sullivan's Quay in 1828 making it the oldest school on Cork’s city southside. In 2019 it became the first English–speaking co-educational Catholic secondary school in Cork city.
