= 1900 Cork Senior Hurling Championship =

Annual hurling competition season

- Dates: 1 July 1900 – 24 March 1901
- Teams: 11
- Champions: Redmonds (2nd title); Jack Leonard (captain)
- Runners-up: Dungourney; Jamesy Kelleher (captain)

The 1900 Cork Senior Hurling Championship was the 14th staging of the Cork Senior Hurling Championship since its establishment by the Cork County Board in 1887. The draw for the opening round fixtures took place on 20 May 1900. The championship began on 1 July 1900 and ended on 24 March 1901.

St. Finbarr's were the defending champions, however, they were beaten by Dungourney in the first round.

On 24 March 1901, Redmonds won the championship following a 1–09 to 2–03 defeat of Dungourney in the final. This was their second championship title overall and their first in eight championship seasons.

== Results ==
=== Final ===
20 January 1901 Final	Redmonds	w/o - scr.	Dungourney	Turner's Cross

24 March 1901 Final refixture	Redmonds	1-09 – 2-03	Dungourney	Carrigtwohill Sportsfield

== Championship statistics ==
=== Miscellaneous ===
- Redmonds were initially awarded the title without having to play the final after Dungourney refused to play at Turner's Cross as they believed Redmonds would have an advantage of playing at the city ground. Their appeal was eventually upheld and a refixture ordered.
- Redmonds win their first title since 1892.
- Dungourney qualify for the final for the first time.
