= 1927 All-Ireland Senior Hurling Championship =

All-Ireland champions
- Winning team: Dublin (5th win)
- Captain: Mick Gill

All-Ireland Finalists
- Losing team: Cork
- Captain: Seán Óg Murphy

Provincial champions
- Munster: Cork
- Leinster: Dublin
- Ulster: Antrim
- Connacht: Not Played

Championship statistics
- All-Star Team: See here

The All-Ireland Senior Hurling Championship 1927 was the 41st series of the All-Ireland Senior Hurling Championship, Ireland's premier hurling knock-out competition. Dublin won the championship, beating Cork 4–8 to 1–3 in the final.

== Format ==
All-Ireland Championship

Semi-final: (1 match) The winners of the Munster championship were drawn to play Galway, who received a bye to this stage of the championship. One team was eliminated at this stage while the winning team advanced to the final.

Final: (1 match) The winners of the lone semi-final and the Leinster champions contested this game with the winners being declared All-Ireland champions.

== Results ==
=== Leinster Senior Hurling Championship ===
May 29

Laois	2–1 – 4–7	Kilkenny

Kilkenny

July 3
Semi-final

Offaly	1–1 – 5–6	Kilkenny

O'Connor Park, Tullamore

July 17
Final

Dublin	7–7 – 4–6	Kilkenny

Croke Park, Dublin

=== Munster Senior Hurling Championship ===
May 29
Quarter-final

Kerry	1–1 – 9–7	Cork

Austin Stack Park, Tralee

May 29
Semi-final

Waterford	6–5 – 8–1	Clare

Fraher Field, Dungarvan

July 3
Quarter-final

Limerick	3–4 – 3–1	Tipperary

Cork Athletic Grounds, Cork

July 24
Semi-final

Cork	2–13 – 2–3	Limerick

Thurles Sportsfield, Thurles

August 7
Final

Cork	5–3 – 3–4	Clare

Markets Field, Limerick

=== Ulster Senior Hurling Championship ===
2 October
Final

Antrim	5–4 – 3–3	Cavan

Cavan

=== All-Ireland Senior Hurling Championship ===
August 21
Semi-final

Cork	5–6 – 0–2	Galway

Thurles Sportsfield, Thurles

September 4
Final

Dublin	4–8 – 1–3	Cork

Croke Park, Dublin
Attendance: 23,684
Referee: D. Lanigan (Limerick)

== Sources ==
- Corry, Eoghan, The GAA Book of Lists (Hodder Headline Ireland, 2005).
- Donegan, Des, The Complete Handbook of Gaelic Games (DBA Publications Limited, 2005).
