= 1902 All-Ireland Senior Hurling Championship final =

1902 All-Ireland Senior Hurling Final
- Event: 1902 All-Ireland Senior Hurling Championship
Cork	London
3-13	0-0
- Date: 11 September 1904
- Venue: Cork Athletic Grounds, Cork
- Referee: L. J. O'Toole (Dublin)
- Attendance: 8,000

The 1902 All-Ireland Senior Hurling Championship Final was the 15th All-Ireland Final and the culmination of the 1902 All-Ireland Senior Hurling Championship, an inter-county hurling tournament for the top teams in Ireland. The match was held at the Cork Athletic Grounds, on 11 September 1904 between London, represented by club side Brian Boru, and Cork, represented by club side from Dungourney. The London champions lost to their Munster opponents on a score line of 3–13 to 0-0.

== Match details ==
1904-09-11

Cork	3-13 – 0-0	London

Cork Athletic Grounds, Cork
Attendance: 10,000
Referee: L. J. O'Toole (Dublin)

Cork Team Jamesy Kelleher, Jim Ronayne, Jackie O'Shea, William Daly, Johnny Daly, Pat Leahy, Tom Mahony, Jerry Jeremiah Desmond, Tom Coughlan, Walter Parfrey, Steva Riordan, J O'Leary, Dave McGrath, Denis Rookereen O'Keefe, Willie O'Neill, Bill Fitzgibbon, Maurice O'Shea
