= 1924 All-Ireland Senior Hurling Championship =

Championship details
- Dates: 4 May – 14 December 1924
- Teams: 15

All-Ireland champions
- Winning team: Dublin (4th win)
- Captain: Frank Wall

All-Ireland Finalists
- Losing team: Galway
- Captain: Mick Kenny

Provincial champions
- Munster: Tipperary
- Leinster: Dublin
- Ulster: Antrim
- Connacht: Not Played

Championship statistics
- No. matches played: 13
- All-Star Team: See here

The 1924 All-Ireland Senior Hurling Championship was the 38th staging of the All-Ireland Senior Hurling Championship, the Gaelic Athletic Association's premier inter-county hurling tournament. The championship began on 4 May 1924 and ended on 14 December 1924.

The championship was won by Dublin who secured the title following a 5–3 to 2–6 defeat of Galway in the All-Ireland final. This was their fourth All-Ireland title.

Galway entered the championship as the defending champions.

== Results ==
=== Leinster Senior Hurling Championship ===
4 May 1924 Semi-final	Dublin	3–4 – 1–3	Kilkenny	Portlaoise Park

4 May 1924 Semi-final	Offaly	w/o. – scr.	Wexford

26 October 1924 Final	Dublin	4–4 – 3–1	Offaly	Croke Park

=== Munster Senior Hurling Championship ===
4 May 1924 Quarter-final	Waterford	3–0 – 8–3	Cork	Waterford Sportsfield

8 June 1924 Quarter-final	Kerry	3–1 – 6–2	Tipperary	Killarney Sportsfield

31 August 1924 Semi-final	Tipperary	7–5 – 2–7	Cork	Fraher Field

Semi-final	Limerick	5–9 – 4–0	Clare

5 October 1924 Final	Tipperary	3–1 – 2–2	Limerick	Fraher Field

=== Ulster Senior Hurling Championship ===
22 June 1924 Semi-final	Monaghan	1–0 – 4–4	Antrim	Pearse Park

12 October 1924 Semi-final	Cavan	1–2 – 7–2	Donegal	Breffni Park

2 November 1924 Final	Donegal	4–0 – 5–3	Antrim	Lifford Sportsfield

=== All-Ireland Senior Hurling Championship ===
9 November 1924 Semi-final	Dublin	8–4 – 3–1	Antrim	Croke Park

23 November 1924 Semi-final	Galway	3–1 – 2–3	Tipperary	Croke Park

14 December 1924 Final	Dublin	5–3 – 2–6	Galway	Croke Park

== Sources ==
- Corry, Eoghan, The GAA Book of Lists (Hodder Headline Ireland, 2005).
- Donegan, Des, The Complete Handbook of Gaelic Games (DBA Publications Limited, 2005).
