= 1901 All-Ireland Senior Hurling Championship final =

1901 All-Ireland Senior Hurling Final
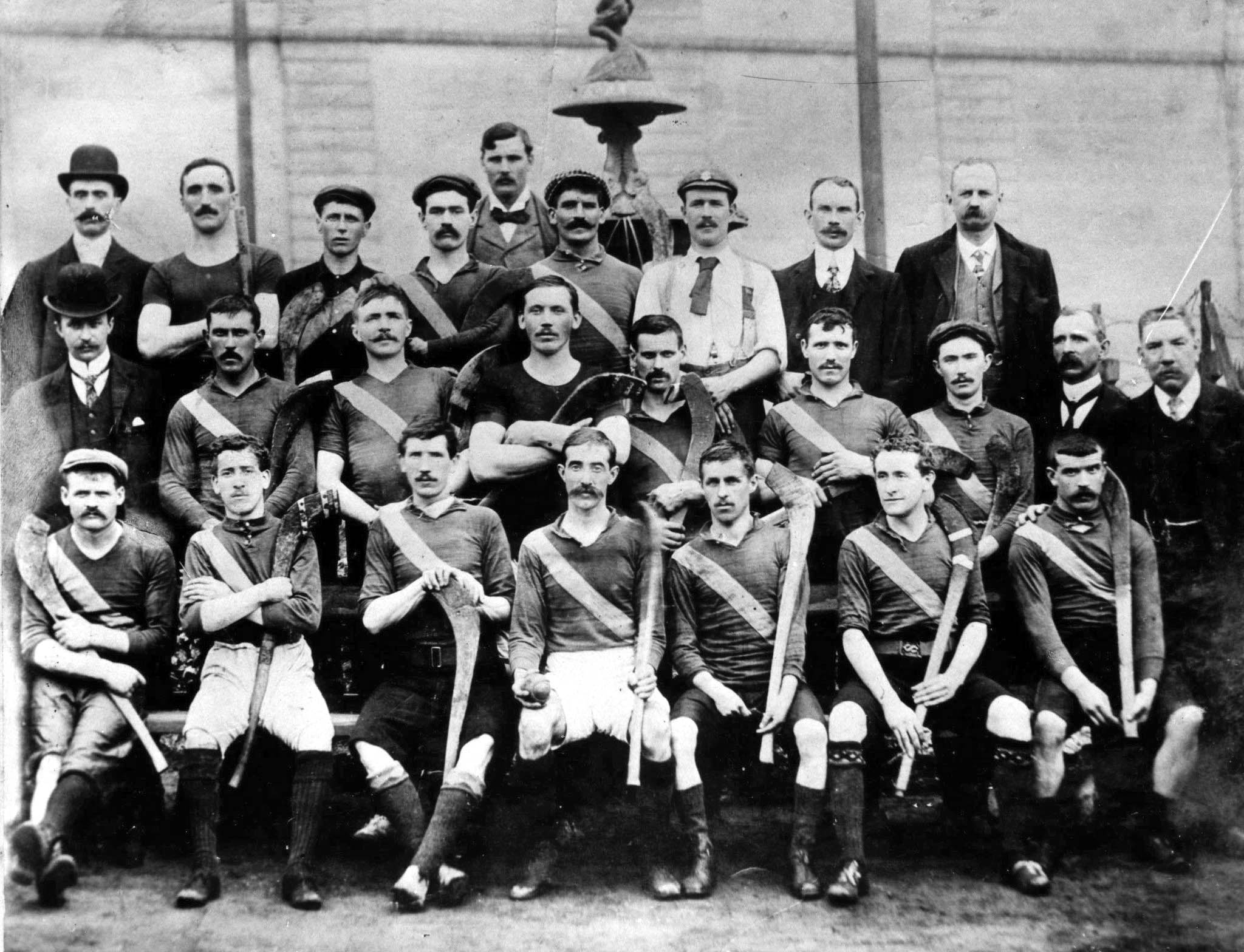
- London, winners
- Event: 1901 All-Ireland Senior Hurling Championship
London	Cork
1-5	0-4
- Date: 2 August 1903
- Venue: Jones' Road, Dublin
- Referee: John McCarthy (Kilkenny)
- Weather: Heavy rain

The 1901 All-Ireland Senior Hurling Championship Final was the 14th All-Ireland final and the culmination of the 1901 All-Ireland Senior Hurling Championship, an inter-county hurling tournament for the top teams in Ireland. The match was held at Jones' Road, Dublin, on 2 August 1903 between London, represented by a selection of clubs, and Cork, represented by Redmond's. The Munster champions lost to their London opponents on a score line of 1–5 to 0–4.

== Match details ==
1903-08-02

London	1–5 – 0–4	Cork

Jones' Road, Dublin
Referee: John McCarthy (Kilkenny)

London
Cork
