= Bill O'Callaghan =

Irish hurler

William O’Callaghan
Personal information
- Native name: Liam Ó Ceallacháin (Irish)
- Nickname: Bill
- Born: 1868 Cork, Ireland
- Died: 16 January 1946 (aged 77) Dorset, England
- Occupation: Telegraph clerk

Sport
- Sport: Hurling
- Position: Forward
Club
- Years: Club
- Redmond's
Club titles
- Cork titles: 1
Inter-county*
| Years | County | Apps (scores) |
| 1892-1893 | Cork | 2 |
Inter-county titles
- Munster titles: 1
- All-Irelands: 1
- *Inter County team apps and scores correct as of 13:46, 3 May 2015.

William Henry O’Callaghan (1868 – 16 January 1946) was an Irish hurler who played as a forward for the Cork senior team.

Born in Cork, O'Callaghan first arrived on the inter-county scene at the age of twenty-four when he first linked up with the Cork senior team. He made his senior debut during the 1892 championship. O'Callaghan immediately became a regular member of the team and won one All-Ireland medal and one Munster medal. In 1892 O'Callaghan captained the team to the All-Ireland title.

At club level O'Callaghan was a one-time championship medalist with Redmond's.

Throughout his career O'Callaghan made just two championship appearances. He retired from inter-county hurling following the conclusion of the 1893 championship.

Sporting positions
| Preceded by Stephen Hayes | Cork Senior Hurling Captain; 1892 | Succeeded by John 'Curtis' Murphy |
Achievements
| Preceded by John Mahony (Kerry) | All-Ireland Senior Hurling Final winning captain 1892 | Succeeded by John 'Curtis' Murphy (Cork) |
