= Carrigtwohill GAA =

Gaelic games club in County Cork, Ireland

Carrigtwohill
- Carraig Tuathaill
- Founded: 1885
- County: Cork
- Nickname: Carrig
- Colours
- Grounds: Páirc Shéamuis de Barra
- Coordinates: 51°54′29.86″N 8°15′57.68″W

Playing kits
Standard colours

Senior Club Championships
	All Ireland	Munster champions	Cork champions
Hurling:	0	0	2

Carrigtwohill GAA is a Gaelic Athletic Association club in Carrigtwohill, County Cork, Ireland. The club is affiliated to the East Cork Board and fields teams in both hurling and Gaelic football.

== History ==
Located in the town of Carrigtwohill, about 12km east of Cork, Carrigtwohill GAA Club is believed to have been founded in 1885. The newly-created club entered a team in the inaugural Cork SHC in 1887, however, it was 1896 before Carrigtwohill had their first success when they beat Redmonds to win the Cork JHC title. It was the first of six such titles in that grade.

Carrigtwohill won their first Cork IHC title in 1909, following an 18-point victory over Bandon. The club completed the full set of championship titles in 1918, when they claimed their first Cork SHC title after a 4-01 to 1-07 defeat of Blackrock in the final. Carrigtwohill later lost four Cork SHC finals in six seasons between 1932 and 1937, however, the club continued to win Cork JHC and IHC titles at regular intervals.

The new century saw a return to top flight hurling for Carrigtwohill after beating Watergrasshill by 3-14 to 3-12 to claim the Cork PIHC title in 2007. The club bridged a 93-year gap in 2011 by winning a second Cork SHC title following a one-point win over Cork Institute of Technology in the final.

== Roll of honour ==
- Cork Senior Hurling Championship (2): 1918, 2011
- Cork Premier Intermediate Hurling Championship (1): 2007
- Cork Intermediate Hurling Championship (3): 1909, 1949, 1950
- Cork Junior Hurling Championship (6): 1896, 1915, 1941, 1948, 1966, 1994
- Cork Minor Hurling Championship (1): 1998
- Cork Minor A Hurling Championship (1): 2007
- East Cork Junior A Hurling Championship (9): 1941, 1947, 1948, 1956, 1962, 1965, 1966, 1978, 1994
- East Cork Junior A Football Championship (3): 1993, 1997, 2000

== Notable players ==
- Tom Barry: All-Ireland SHC-winner (1928, 1929, 1931)
- Willie John Daly: All-Ireland SHC-winner (1952, 1953, 1954)
- Bill Fitzgibbon: All-Ireland SHC-winner (1902)
- Matty Fouhy: All-Ireland SHC-winner (1944, 1952, 1953, 1954)
- Ned Grey: All-Ireland SHC-winner (1919)
- Jimmy Kennedy: All-Ireland SHC-winner (1919, 1926)
- Niall McCarthy: All-Ireland SHC-winner (2004, 2005)
