= 1901 All-Ireland Senior Hurling Championship =

All-Ireland champions
- Winning team: London (1st win)
- Captain: Jack Coughlan

All-Ireland Finalists
- Losing team: Cork
- Captain: Paddy Cantillon

Provincial champions
- Munster: Cork
- Leinster: Wexford
- Ulster: Antrim
- Connacht: Galway

Championship statistics
- All-Star Team: See here

The All-Ireland Senior Hurling Championship 1901 was the 15th series of the All-Ireland Senior Hurling Championship, Ireland's premier hurling knock-out competition. London won the championship, beating Cork 1–5 to 0–4 in the final.

== Rule change ==
For the first time ever a hurling championship took place in all of the four historic provinces of Ireland – Connacht, Leinster, Munster and Ulster. For the purposes of the all GAA competitions, Britain was designated as a fifth Irish province. As a consequence, the winners of the championship in Britain would meet the winners of the championship in Ireland to decide the All-Ireland title holders.

== Format ==
All-Ireland Championship

Semi-final: (2 matches) The four provincial representatives make up the semi-final pairings. Two teams are eliminated at this stage while the two winning teams advance to the home final.

Home final: (1 match) The winners of the two semi-finals contest this game. One team is eliminated while the winning team advances to the final.

Final: (1 match) The winners of the home final and London, who receive a bye to this stage of the championship, contest this game. The winners are declared All-Ireland champions.

== Provincial championships ==
=== Connacht Senior Hurling Championship ===
3 May 1903 Final	Galway	4–10 – 2–0	Roscommon

=== Leinster Senior Hurling Championship ===
26 April 1903 Final	Wexford	7–6 – 1–3	Offaly	Kilkenny

=== Munster Senior Hurling Championship ===
27 July 1902	Cork	2–12 – 1–5	Limerick	Turner's Cross

31 August 1902	Kerry	1–4 – 3–12	Cork	Markets Field
				Referee: J Cummins

28 September 1902 Semi-final	Limerick	6–9 – 3–13	Clare	Markets Field

19 October 1902 Quarter-final	Tipperary	7–12 – 0–00	Waterford	Cork Athletic Grounds

7 December 1902 Semi-final refixture	Limerick	0–1 – 2–10	Clare	Markets Field
				Referee: T Dooley

29 March 1903 Semi-final	Cork	w/o – scr.	Tipperary

26 April 1903 Final	Cork	3–10 – 2–6	Clare	Markets Field

=== Ulster Senior Hurling Championship ===
5 April 1903 Final	Antrim	about 41 pts – 12 pts	Derry

Exact score is not recorded.

== All-Ireland Senior Hurling Championship ==
=== All-Ireland semi-finals ===
12 April 1903 Semi-final	Wexford	7–12 – 1–3	Antrim	Jones's Road

17 May 1903 Semi-final	Cork	7–12 – 1–3	Galway	Markets Field

=== All-Ireland home final ===
14 June 1903 Home final	Cork	2–8 – 0–6	Wexford	Carrick-on-Suir

=== All-Ireland final ===
2 August 1903 Final	London	1–5 – 0–4	Cork	Jones's Road
				Referee: J McCarthy

== Championship statistics ==
=== Miscellaneous ===
- The Ulster Championship was contested for the first time.
- The All-Ireland title went overseas for the first time when London defeated Cork in the decider. In doing so London became the sixth team to win the All-Ireland. The London team was made up of all Munster men: nine from Cork, four from Clare, two from Limerick and one each from Kerry and Tipperary.

== Sources ==
- Corry, Eoghan, The GAA Book of Lists (Hodder Headline Ireland, 2005).
- Donegan, Des, The Complete Handbook of Gaelic Games (DBA Publications Limited, 2005).
- Fullam, Brendan, Captains of the Ash (Wolfhound Press, 2002).
