= Redmonds GAA =

Gaelic games club in County Cork, Ireland

Redmonds
- Na Réamónaigh
- Founded: 1892
- County: Cork
- Nickname: Sporting Reds
- Colours
- Grounds: Páirc Uí Laoire

Playing kits
Standard colours

Senior Club Championships
	All Ireland	Munster champions	Cork champions
Hurling:	0	0	5

Redmonds Hurling and Football Club was a Gaelic Athletic Association club located in the Tower Street area of Cork, Ireland. The club was affiliated to the Seandún Board and fielded teams in both hurling and Gaelic football.

== History ==
Redmonds Hurling and Football Club was founded in 1892 when a group of players, nicknamed "the 12 apostles", left St Finbarr's National Hurling & Football Club due to a political split between pro- and anti-Parnellites. The new team was named after the leader of the pro-Parnell faction of the Irish Parliamentary Party, John Redmond. The new club ended their debut year by winning the Cork SHC for the first time. Redmonds subsequently represented Cork in the inter-county series of games and also won the 1892 All-Ireland SHC title after a win over Dublin in the final.

Five Cork SHC titles were won in all, with further victories coming in 1900, 1901, 1915 and 1917. The club also won Munster SHC titles in 1901 and 1915. Redmonds also had successes in the lower grades of Cork hurling. They won five Cork JHC title, including four successive titles between 1896 and 1900, before securing the full set of honours with the Cork IHC title in 1913. Redmonds contested their last Cork SHC final in 1927. A heavy 12-04 to 1-01 loss in the opening round of the 1937 Championship to Muskerry was the clubs last game in the senior championship.

Redmonds' decline as a force in Cork hurling was gradual over the course of the following decades, as players gravitated towards bigger local clubs such as St Finbarr's and Nemo Rangers. The club was also hindered by having no official playing field of their own, however, this issue was resolved in 1984 when Páirc Uí Laoire was opened in 1984. The changing demographics of the southside of the city also meant that playing numbers dwindled, while the club was unable to develop an underage structure for the children living in its natural catchment area. Redmonds officially disbanded on 31 December 2018.

== Honours ==
- All-Ireland Senior Hurling Championship (1): 1892
- Munster Senior Hurling Championship (1): 1892, 1901, 1915
- Cork Premier Senior Hurling Championship (5): 1892, 1900, 1901, 1915, 1917
- Cork Intermediate A Hurling Championship (1): 1913
- Cork Junior A Hurling Championship (5): 1897, 1898, 1899, 1900, 1909

== Notable players ==
- Bill Fitzgibbon: All-Ireland SHC-winner (1902).
- Tom Irwin: All-Ireland SHC-winner (1892).
- Morgan Madden: All-Ireland SHC-winner (1928, 1929, 1931).
- Bill O'Callaghan: All-Ireland SHC-winning captain (1892).
