= All-Ireland Senior Hurling Championship records and statistics =

This page details statistics of the All-Ireland Senior Hurling Championship.

== General performances ==
=== Performances by county ===

County	Title(s)	Runners-up	Championships won	Championships runner-up
Kilkenny	36	29	1904, 1905, 1907, 1909, 1911, 1912, 1913, 1922, 1932, 1933, 1935, 1939, 1947, 1957, 1963, 1967, 1969, 1972, 1974, 1975, 1979, 1982, 1983, 1992, 1993, 2000, 2002, 2003, 2006, 2007, 2008, 2009, 2011, 2012, 2014, 2015	1893, 1895, 1897, 1898, 1916, 1926, 1931, 1936, 1937, 1940, 1945, 1946, 1950, 1959, 1964, 1966, 1971, 1973, 1978, 1987, 1991, 1998, 1999, 2004, 2010, 2016, 2019, 2022, 2023
Cork	30	22	1890, 1892, 1893, 1894, 1902, 1903, 1919, 1926, 1928, 1929, 1931, 1941, 1942, 1943, 1944, 1946, 1952, 1953, 1954, 1966, 1970, 1976, 1977, 1978, 1984, 1986, 1990, 1999, 2004, 2005	1901, 1904, 1905, 1907, 1912, 1915, 1920, 1927, 1939, 1947, 1956, 1969, 1972, 1982, 1983, 1992, 2003, 2006, 2013, 2021, 2024, 2025
Tipperary	29	13	1887, 1895, 1896, 1898, 1899, 1900, 1906, 1908, 1916, 1925, 1930, 1937, 1945, 1949, 1950, 1951, 1958, 1961, 1962, 1964, 1965, 1971, 1989, 1991, 2001, 2010, 2016, 2019, 2025	1909, 1911, 1913, 1917, 1922, 1960, 1967, 1968, 1988, 1997, 2009, 2011, 2014
Limerick	13	9	1897, 1918, 1921, 1934, 1936, 1940, 1973, 2018, 2020, 2021, 2022, 2023, 2026	1910, 1923, 1933, 1935, 1974, 1980, 1994, 1996, 2007
Dublin	6	15	1889, 1917, 1920, 1924, 1927, 1938	1892, 1894, 1896, 1906, 1908, 1919, 1921, 1930, 1934, 1941, 1942, 1944, 1948, 1952, 1961
Wexford	6	11	1910, 1955, 1956, 1960, 1968, 1996	1890, 1891, 1899, 1918, 1951, 1954, 1962, 1965, 1970, 1976, 1977
Galway	5	21	1923, 1980, 1987, 1988, 2017	1887, 1924, 1925, 1928, 1929, 1953, 1955, 1958, 1975, 1979, 1981, 1985, 1986, 1990, 1993, 2001, 2005, 2012, 2015, 2018, 2026
Clare	5	3	1914, 1995, 1997, 2013, 2024	1889, 1932, 2002
Offaly	4	3	1981, 1985, 1994, 1998	1984, 1995, 2000
Waterford	2	6	1948, 1959	1938, 1957, 1963, 2008, 2017, 2020
London	1	3	1901	1900, 1902, 1903
Laois	1	2	1915	1914, 1949
Kerry	1	0	1891	—
Antrim	0	2	—	1943, 1989

=== Performance by province ===
Province	Won	Lost	Total	Last win	Different counties
Munster	80	53	133	2026	6
Leinster	53	60	113	2015	5
Connacht	5	21	26	2017	1
Britain	1	3	4	1901	1
Ulster	0	2	2	—	1

==== Counties per province ====
Province	Winners	Runners-up	% Wins per final	Winning teams	Runners-up
Munster	80	53	60%	Cork (30), Tipperary (29), Limerick (13), Clare (5), Waterford (2), Kerry (1)	Cork (22), Tipperary (13), Limerick (9), Waterford (6), Clare (3)
Leinster	53	60	47%	Kilkenny (36), Dublin (6), Wexford (6), Offaly (4), Laois (1)	Kilkenny (29), Dublin (15), Wexford (11), Offaly (3), Laois (2)
Connacht	5	21	19%	Galway (5)	Galway (21)
Britain	1	3	25%	London (1)	London (3)
Ulster	0	2	0%		Antrim (2)

=== Provincial titles ===
County	Titles	Last provincial title
Kilkenny	77	2025 (Leinster)
Antrim	58	2017 (Ulster)
Cork	55	2025 (Munster)
Tipperary	42	2016 (Munster)
Limerick	26	2026 (Munster)
Dublin	24	2013 (Leinster)
Galway	24	2026 (Leinster)
Wexford	21	2019 (Leinster)
Offaly	9	1995 (Leinster)
Waterford	9	2010 (Munster)
Clare	6	1998 (Munster)
Down	4	1997 (Ulster)
Derry	4	2001 (Ulster)
Donegal	3	1932 (Ulster)
Laois	3	1949 (Leinster)
Monaghan	2	1915 (Ulster)
Kerry	1	1891 (Munster)
Mayo	1	1909 (Connacht)
Roscommon	1	1913 (Connacht)

== Counties ==
=== By semi-final appearances ===
As of 21 June 2026.

#	Team	No. of Appearances	First semi-final appearance	Most recent semi-final appearance
1	Galway	91	1887	2026
2	Kilkenny	61	1887	2025
3	Cork	45	1901	2026
4	Tipperary	38	1887	2025
5	Antrim	29	1900	1996
6	Limerick	24	1911	2026
7	Waterford	17	1938	2021
8	Wexford	16	1887	2019
9	Clare	16	1914	2026
10	Dublin	15	1902	2025
11	Offaly	11	1980	2000
12	London	6	1906	1973
13	Derry	2	1902	1909
13	Laois	2	1915	1949
13	Down	2	1992	1995
16	Kerry	1	1891	1891
16	Cavan	1	1908	1908
16	Mayo	1	1909	1909
16	Glasgow	1	1910	1910
16	Lancashire	1	1913	1913
16	Roscommon	1	1913	1913
16	Monaghan	1	1915	1915
16	Donegal	1	1923	1923

- 23 counties have reached an all-Ireland semi-final at least once.
- Carlow, Meath and Westmeath are the most notable counties to never reach a semi-final.

=== Semi-final appearances (2001–present) ===
#	County	No.	Years
1	Kilkenny	22	2001, 2002, 2003, 2004, 2005, 2006, 2007, 2008, 2009, 2010, 2011, 2012, 2014, 2015, 2016, 2019, 2020, 2021, 2022, 2023, 2024, 2025
2	Cork	15	2003, 2004, 2005, 2006, 2008, 2010, 2012, 2013, 2014, 2017, 2018, 2021, 2024, 2025, 2026
3	Tipperary	14	2001, 2002, 2003, 2008, 2009, 2010, 2011, 2012, 2014, 2015, 2016, 2017, 2019, 2025
4	Waterford	13	2002, 2004, 2006, 2007, 2008, 2009, 2010, 2011, 2015, 2016, 2017, 2020, 2021
5	Limerick	12	2007, 2009, 2013, 2014, 2018, 2019, 2020, 2021, 2022, 2023, 2024, 2026
6	Galway	11	2001, 2005, 2012, 2015, 2016, 2017, 2018, 2020, 2022, 2023, 2026
7	Clare	9	2002, 2005, 2006, 2013, 2018, 2022, 2023, 2024, 2026
8	Wexford	5	2001, 2003, 2004, 2007, 2019
9	Dublin	3	2011, 2013, 2025

=== Consecutive Wins ===
==== Quadruple ====
- Cork (1941, 1942, 1943, 1944)
- Kilkenny (2006, 2007, 2008, 2009)
- Limerick (2020, 2021, 2022, 2023)

==== Treble ====
- Cork (1892, 1893, 1894)
- Tipperary (1898, 1899, 1900)
- Kilkenny (1911, 1912, 1913)
- Tipperary (1949, 1950, 1951)
- Cork (1952, 1953, 1954)
- Cork (1976, 1977, 1978)

==== Double ====
- Tipperary (1895, 1896)
- Cork (1902, 1903)
- Kilkenny (1904, 1905)
- Cork (1928, 1929)
- Kilkenny (1932, 1933)
- Wexford (1955, 1956)
- Tipperary (1961, 1962)
- Tipperary (1964, 1965)
- Kilkenny (1974, 1975)
- Kilkenny (1982, 1983)
- Galway (1987, 1988)
- Kilkenny (1992, 1993)
- Kilkenny (2002, 2003)
- Cork (2004, 2005)
- Kilkenny (2011, 2012)
- Kilkenny (2014, 2015)

==== Single ====
- Tipperary (1887, 1906, 1908, 1916, 1925, 1930, 1937, 1945, 1958, 1971, 1989, 1991, 2001, 2010, 2016, 2019, 2025)
- Kilkenny (1907, 1909, 1922, 1935, 1939, 1947, 1957, 1963, 1967, 1969, 1972, 1979, 2000)
- Cork (1890, 1919, 1926, 1931, 1946, 1966, 1970, 1984, 1986, 1990, 1999)
- Limerick (1897, 1918, 1921, 1934, 1936, 1940, 1973, 2018, 2026)
- Dublin (1889, 1917, 1920, 1924, 1927, 1938)
- Clare (1914, 1995, 1997, 2013, 2024)
- Wexford (1910, 1960, 1968, 1996)
- Offaly (1981, 1985, 1994, 1998)
- Galway (1923, 1980, 2017)
- Waterford (1948, 1959)
- Kerry (1891)
- London (1901)
- Laois (1915)

=== Consecutive All-Ireland Stoppers ===
Teams that ended All-Ireland winning streaks in the final of the championship.

==== 5-in-a-row ====
Tipperary (2010) defeated Kilkenny

==== 3-in-a-row ====
Kilkenny (1904, 2006) defeated Cork

Tipperary (2016) defeated Kilkenny

Cork (2004) defeated Kilkenny

==== 2-in-a-row ====
Cork (1902) defeated London

Kilkenny (1909, 1935, 1947, 1974, 2011) defeated Tipperary in 1909 and 2011, Limerick in 1935 and 1974 and Cork in 1947

Dublin (1917, 1920, 1924, 1927) defeated Cork in 1920 and 1927, Tipperary in 1917 and Galway in 1924

Limerick (1921, 1936, 1940, 1973, 2018) defeated Kilkenny in 1936, 1940 and 1973, Dublin in 1921 and Galway in 2018

Tipperary (1964) defeated Kilkenny

Offaly (1981) defeated Galway

Clare (1995) defeated Offaly

== Least successful counties ==
There are nineteen counties that have never been represented in a Senior All-Ireland Final. These are Armagh, Carlow, Cavan, Derry, Donegal, Down, Fermanagh, Kildare, Leitrim, Longford, Louth, Mayo, Meath, Monaghan, Tyrone, Roscommon, Sligo, Westmeath and Wicklow. Fourteen of these counties have never competed in a semi-final: Armagh, Carlow, Cavan, Fermanagh, Kildare, Leitrim, Longford, Louth, Meath, Monaghan, Tyrone, Sligo, Westmeath and Wicklow

Carlow and Westmeath have been successful in senior B level championships such as the All-Ireland Senior B Hurling Championship and the Joe McDonagh Cup.

=== Levels ===
In the last few years, counties can be divided into four levels or tiers, based on results: Tier 1 counties are consistent participants in the provincial championships. Tier 2 counties usually compete in the provincial championships or the Joe McDonagh Cup. Tier 3 counties usually compete in the Christy Ring Cup or the Nicky Rackard Cup. Tier 4 counties usually compete in the Nicky Rackard Cup or the Lory Meagher Cup.

Tier 1 counties (9): Clare, Cork, Dublin, Galway, Kilkenny, Limerick, Tipperary, Waterford, Wexford

Tier 2 counties (9): Antrim, Carlow, Down, Kerry, Kildare, Laois, Meath, Offaly, Westmeath

Tier 3 counties (9): Armagh, Derry, Donegal, London, Mayo, Roscommon, Sligo, Tyrone, Wicklow

Tier 4 counties (8): Cavan, Fermanagh, Lancashire, Leitrim, Longford, Louth, Monaghan, Warwickshire

== Team participation ==
=== Debut of counties ===
Year	Debutants	Total
1887	Clare, Dublin, Galway, Kilkenny, Tipperary, Wexford	6
1888	Cork, Kildare, Laois, Limerick, Waterford	5
1889	Kerry, Louth	2
1890–95	None	0
1896	Offaly	1
1897–99	None	0
1900	Antrim, London, Sligo	3
1901	Derry, Roscommon	2
1902	Carlow, Meath	2
1903	Donegal, Longford	2
1904	None	0
1905	Down, Glasgow, Lancashire, Mayo	4
1906–07	None	0
1908	Cavan, Fermanagh	2
1909	Monaghan	1
1910–12	None	0
1913	Westmeath	1
1914	None	0
1915	Wicklow	1
1916–45	None	0
1946	Armagh	1
1947–95	None	0
1996	New York	1
1997–present	None	0
**Total**		**34**

=== List of All-Ireland Senior Hurling Championship counties ===
The following teams have competed in the All-Ireland Championship for at least one season.

County	Appearances	First	Most recent	Current Championship	Championship Titles (Most recent title)			Best All-Ireland Result
County	Appearances	First	Most recent	Current Championship	All-Ireland Titles	Provincial Titles	Cup titles	Best All-Ireland Result
Antrim	68	1900	2025	Joe McDonagh Cup	—N/a	58 (2017)	3 (2022)	Runners-up
Armagh	1	1946		Lory Meagher Cup	—N/a	—N/a	2 (2012)	Ulster runners-up
Carlow	30	1902	2025	Joe McDonagh Cup	—N/a	—N/a	5 (2023)	Quarter-finals
Cavan	4	1908	1925	Lory Meagher Cup	—N/a	—N/a	—N/a	Semi-finals
Clare	125	1887	2026	Munster Senior Hurling Championship	5 (2024)	6 (1998)	—N/a	Champions
Cork	136	1888	2026	Munster Senior Hurling Championship	30 (2005)	54 (2025)	—N/a	Champions
Derry	17	1901	2004	Joe McDonagh Cup	—N/a	4 (2001)	3 (2026)	Semi-finals
Donegal	9	1903	1946	Christy Ring Cup	—N/a	3 (1932)	5 (2024)	Semi-finals
Down	25	1905	2025	Joe McDonagh Cup	—N/a	4 (1997)	1 (2013)	Semi-finals
Dublin	137	1887	2026	Leinster Senior Hurling Championship	6 (1938)	24 (2013)	—N/a	Champions
Fermanagh	2	1908	1946	Nicky Rackard Cup	—N/a	—N/a	3 (2024)	Ulster semi-finals
Galway	128	1887	2026	Leinster Senior Hurling Championship	5 (2017)	29 (2026)	—N/a	Champions
Glasgow	3	1905	1913	Not correctly competing	—N/a	—N/a	—N/a	Semi-finals
Kerry	63	1889	2025	Christy Ring Cup	1 (1891)	1 (1891)	2 (2015)	Champions
Kildare	23	1888	2026	Joe McDonagh Cup	—N/a	—N/a	6 (2025)	Quarter-finals
Kilkenny	136	1887	2026	Leinster Senior Hurling Championship	36 (2015)	74 (2025)	—N/a	Champions
Lancashire	2	1905	1913	Lory Meagher Cup	—N/a	—N/a	—N/a	Semi-finals
Laois	115	1888	2025	Leinster Senior Hurling Championship	1 (1915)	3 (1949)	2 (2026)	Champions
Leitrim	0	—N/a	—N/a	Lory Meagher Cup	—N/a	—N/a	1 (2019)	—N/a
Limerick	131	1888	2026	Munster Senior Hurling Championship	13 (2026)	26 (2026)	—N/a	Champions
London	27	1900	2014	Christy Ring Cup	1 (1901)	—N/a	4 (2025)	Champions
Longford	2	1902	1903	Nicky Rackard Cup	—N/a	—N/a	3 (2026)	Leinster first round
Louth	3	1889	1920	Nicky Rackard Cup	—N/a	—N/a	3 (2022)	Leinster quarter-finals
Mayo	3	1905	1913	Nicky Rackard Cup	—N/a	1 (1909)	2 (2021)	Semi-finals
Meath	48	1902	2024	Christy Ring Cup	—N/a	—N/a	4 (2023)	Quarter-finals
Monaghan	8	1909	1946	Lory Meagher Cup	—N/a	2 (1915)	1 (2023)	Ulster runners-up
New York	6	1996	2004	Christy Ring Cup	—N/a	—N/a	2 (2026)	Quarter-finals
Offaly	119	1896	2026	Leinster Senior Hurling Championship	4 (1998)	9 (1995)	2 (2024)	Champions
Roscommon	18	1901	1999	Christy Ring Cup	—N/a	1 (1913)	3 (2025)	Semi-finals
Sligo	4	1900	1913	Nicky Rackard Cup	—N/a	—N/a	3 (2019)	Connacht runners-up
Tipperary	134	1887	2026	Munster Senior Hurling Championship	29 (2025)	42 (2016)	—N/a	Champions
Tyrone	0	—N/a	—N/a	Nicky Rackard Cup	—N/a	—N/a	4 (2022)	—N/a
Warwickshire	0	—N/a	—N/a	Lory Meagher Cup	—N/a	—N/a	2 (2017)	—N/a
Waterford	122	1888	2026	Munster Senior Hurling Championship	2 (1959)	9 (2010)	—N/a	Champions
Westmeath	79	1913	2025	Joe McDonagh Cup	—N/a	—N/a	4 (2021)	Quarter-finals
Wexford	119	1887	2026	Leinster Senior Hurling Championship	6 (1996)	21 (2019)	—N/a	Champions
Wicklow	10	1915	2004	Christy Ring Cup	—N/a	—N/a	1 (2023)	Leinster quarter-finals

=== Seasons in All-Ireland Senior Hurling Championship ===
The number of years that each county has played in the All-Ireland between 1980 and 2024. A total of 23 counties have competed in at least one season of the All-Ireland. Ten counties have participated in all 45 seasons. The counties in bold participate in the 2024 All-Ireland Senior Hurling Championship.

Years	Counties
45	**Clare**, **Cork**, **Dublin**, **Galway**, **Kilkenny**, **Laois**, **Limerick**, **Tipperary**, **Waterford**, **Wexford**
43	**Offaly**
40	**Antrim**
33	**Westmeath**
25	**Kerry**
23	**Carlow**
19	**Down**
15	London
14	**Meath**
12	Derry
7	Kildare
6	New York, Roscommon
5	Wicklow

== Team results table ==
=== Results table ===
This section represents in colour-coded tabular format the results of GAA county teams in the All-Ireland Senior Hurling Championship since 1997.

Prior to 1997, counties played in separate provincial championships, with only four or fewer provincial champions coming together in the All-Ireland semi-finals, and it is difficult to directly compare results across counties. Since 1997, several beaten teams from the provincial championships play together in the All-Ireland qualifier series, making it easier to rank teams based on performance.

Used in all seasons

- Ch — Champions
- RU — Runners-up
- SF — All-Ireland semi-finals (3rd–4th place)
- ♥ — Munster champions
- ♦ — Leinster champions
- — — did not compete
- QF — All-Ireland quarter-finals (5th–6th place)
- PQF — All-Ireland preliminary quarter-finals (7th–8th place)
- Lrr4 Mrr4 — Leinster/Munster round robin, 4th place (9th–10th place)
- Lrr5 Lrr6 Mrr5 — Leinster/Munster round robin, 5th place (11th–13th place)

=== Past ===
- The All-Ireland championship has used many different competition structures since 1997, and it is not always obvious how to rank teams. In general, the colouring code for champions (red), runners-up (orange) and semi-finalists (yellow) holds true. After that, teams are shaded green, blue, purple and grey in descending order of performance.
- The Ulster Senior Hurling Championship has not had any bearing on the All-Ireland championship since 2005 so it is not included from that year onward.
- There have been some changes of provincial championship:
  - Galway competed in the Connacht Senior Hurling Championship until 1998; they have played in the Leinster Senior Hurling Championship since 2009
  - Kerry competed in the Munster Senior Hurling Championship until 2004; they played in the Leinster Senior Hurling Championship in 2016 and 2017
  - Antrim compete in the Ulster Senior Hurling Championship, however, it has not been part of the All-Ireland since 2004; they played in the Leinster Senior Hurling Championship from 2009 to 2015
  - London competed in the Ulster Senior Hurling Championship until 2004; they played in the Leinster Senior Hurling Championship in 2013 and 2014

Past Abbreviations used:

- ♣ — Ulster champions
- ♠ — Connacht champions
- QF – All-Ireland quarter-finalists
- QR3 – All-Ireland qualifiers, round 3
- QR2 – All-Ireland qualifiers, round 2
- QR1 – All-Ireland qualifiers, round 1
- Qp3 – All-Ireland qualifiers, phase 3
- Qp2 – All-Ireland qualifiers, phase 2
- Qp1 – All-Ireland qualifiers, phase 1
- Qpr – All-Ireland qualifiers, preliminary round
- Qrr3 – All-Ireland qualifiers, round robin, 3rd place
- Qrr4 – All-Ireland qualifiers, round robin, 4th place
- Uf – Ulster finalists
- Usf – Ulster semi-finalists
- Uqf – Ulster quarter-finalists
- Lsf – Leinster semi-finalists
- Lqf – Leinster quarter-finalists
- L1r – Leinster first round
- Lpr – Leinster preliminary round
- Lpr2 – Leinster second preliminary round
- Lpr1 – Leinster first preliminary round
- Lpqr – Leinster preliminary quarter-final
- Lrr2 – Leinster round robin, 2nd place
- Lrr3 – Leinster round robin, 3rd place
- Lrr4 – Leinster round robin, 4th place
- Msf – Munster semi-finalists
- Mqf – Munster quarter-finalists
- Cf – Connacht finalists
- Rsf – won relegation semi-final
- Rf – won relegation final
- Rel – relegated to Christy Ring Cup

=== Results table ===
County	Pr.	′97	′98	′99	′00	′01	′02	′03	′04	′05	′06	′07	′08	′09	′10	′11	′12	′13	′14	′15	′16	′17	′18	′19	′20	′21	′22	′23	′24	′25	′26
Clare	M	Ch♥	SF♥	SF	Msf	Msf	RU	QR1	QF	SF	SF	QF	QF	Qp2	Qp2	Qp2	Qp3	Ch	QR1	QR2	QF	QF	SF	Mrr4	QF	QR2	SF	SF	Ch	Mrr4	SF
Cork	M	Msf	Msf	Ch♥	SF♥	Mqf	QR2	RU♥	Ch	Ch♥	RU♥	QF	SF	Qp3	SF	Qp3	SF	RU	SF♥	QF	QR2	SF♥	SF♥	QF	QR2	RU	QF	Mrr4	RU	RU♥	SF
Kerry	M/L	Mqf	Mqf	Mqf	Mqf	—	—	QR1	Mqf	—	—	—	—	—	—	—	—	—	—	—	Lrr3	Lrr3	—	—	—	—	PQF	—	—	—	—
Limerick	M	Msf	Mqf	Mqf	Msf	QF	QR1	QR2	QR1	QF	QF	RU	Qp3	SF	Qp2	QF	QF	SF♥	SF	QR2	QR2	QR1	Ch	SF♥	Ch♥	Ch♥	Ch♥	Ch♥	SF♥	QF	Ch♥
Tipperary	M	RU	Msf	Msf	QF	Ch♥	SF	SF	QR2	QF	QF	QF	SF♥	RU♥	Ch	RU♥	SF♥	Qp2	RU	SF♥	Ch♥	SF	Mrr4	Ch	QF	QF	Mrr5	QF	Mrr5	Ch	Mrr5
Waterford	M	Mqf	SF	Msf	Mqf	Msf	SF♥	QR2	SF♥	QF	SF	SF♥	RU	SF	SF♥	SF	QF	Qp3	QR2	SF	SF	RU	Mrr5	Mrr5	RU	SF	Mrr4	Mrr5	Mrr4	Mrr5	Mrr4
Carlow	L	—	—	—	Lrr3	Lpr2	Lr1	Qpr	Lpr	—	—	—	—	—	Qp1	Qp1	Qp1	Qp1	Lrr3	Lrr3	Lrr4	Qpr	PQF	Lrr5	—	—	—	PQF	Lrr6	—	—
Dublin	L	Lsf	Lqf	Lqf	Lsf	Lqf	QR1	QR1	QR1	Rsf	Rf	Qrr4	Qp3	QF	Qp3	SF	Qp2	SF♦	QF	QF	QR1	QR2	Lrr4	PQF	QR1	QF	Lrr4	QF	QF	SF	QF
Kildare	L	—	—	—	—	Lpr2	Lr1	Lpqr	Lr1	—	—	—	—	—	—	—	—	—	—	—	—	—	—	—	—	—	—	—	—	PQF	Rel
Kilkenny	L	SF	RU♦	RU♦	Ch♦	SF♦	Ch♦	Ch♦	RU	SF♦	Ch♦	Ch♦	Ch♦	Ch♦	RU♦	Ch♦	Ch	QF	Ch♦	Ch♦	RU♦	QR2	QF	RU	SF♦	SF♦	RU♦	RU♦	SF♦	SF♦	Lrr4
Laois	L	Lqf	Lsf	Lsf	Lrr2	Lsf	Lr2	QR1	QR1	Rf	Qrr3	Qrr4	Qp2	Qp3	Qpr	Qpr	Qpr	Qp2	QR1	QR1	QR1	QR1	—	QF	QR1	QR1	Lrr6	—	PQF	PQF	—
Meath	L	Lpr	Lqf	—	—	L1r	QR1	Lpqr	Lr1	—	—	—	—	—	—	—	—	—	—	—	—	Lrr4	—	—	—	—	—	—	—	—	—
Offaly	L	Lsf	Ch	SF	RU	Lsf	QR2	QF	QR2	Rsf	Qrr3	Qrr3	Qp4	Qp1	Qp3	Qp1	Qp2	Qpr	QR2	QR1	QR1	QR1	Lrr5	—	—	—	—	PQF	PQF	Lrr5	QF
Westmeath	L	Lqf	—	—	Lrr4	Lpr1	Lr2	Qpr	Lqf	—	Rel	—	—	—	—	Qpr	Qpr	Qp1	Lrr4	QR1	QR1	QR1	PQF	PQF	—	—	Lrr5	Lrr6	—	—	—
Wexford	L	SF♦	Lsf	Lsf	Lsf	SF	QR2	SF	SF♦	QF	QF	SF	QF	Qp2	Qp1	Qp2	Qp3	Qp3	QF	QR1	QF	QF	QF	SF♦	QR2	QR1	QF	Lrr4	QF	Lrr4	Lrr5
Wicklow	L	—	—	—	—	Lpr1	Lr1	Lpqr	Lpr	—	—	—	—	—	—	—	—	—	—	—	—	—	—	—	—	—	—	—	—	—	—
Galway	C/L	QF♠	QF♠	QF	SF	RU	QF	QR2	QR2	RU	QF	QF	Qp4	QF	QF	QF	RU♦	QF	QR1	RU	SF	Ch♦	RU♦	Lrr4	SF	QR2	SF	SF	Lrr4	QF	RU♦
Roscommon	C	Cf	Cf	—	—	—	—	—	—	—	—	—	—	—	—	—	—	—	—	—	—	—	—	—	—	—	—	—	—	—	—
Antrim	U/L	Uf	QF♣	QF♣	Uf	Usf	QF♣	QF♣	QF♣	Rel	—	Qrr3	Qp2	Qp1	QF	Qp3	Qp1	Qpr	QR1	Lrr4	—	—	—	—	—	QPR	PQF	Lrr5	Lrr5	Rel	—
Derry	U	Usf	Uf	Uf	QF♣	QF♣	Usf	Qpr	Usf	—	—	—	—	—	—	—	—	—	—	—	—	—	—	—	—	—	—	—	—	—	—
Down	U	QF♣	Usf	Usf	Usf	Uf	QR1	Usf	QR1	—	—	—	—	—	—	—	—	—	—	—	—	—	—	—	—	—	—	—	—	—	—
London	U/L	—	Usf	Usf	Usf	Usf	Uqf	Uqf	Uqf	—	—	—	—	—	—	—	—	Qpr	Lrr5	—	—	—	—	—	—	—	—	—	—	—	—
New York	U	—	—	—	Uqf	Uqf	Usf	Usf	Usf	—	—	—	—	—	—	—	—	—	—	—	—	—	—	—	—	—	—	—	—	—	—

=== Most recent success ===
County	Most recent success	
County	Year won	Competition
Antrim	2022	Joe McDonagh Cup
Armagh	2012	Nicky Rackard Cup
Carlow	2023	Joe McDonagh Cup
Cavan	1985	Ulster Junior Hurling Championship
Clare	2024	All-Ireland Senior Hurling Championship
Cork	2025	Munster Senior Hurling Championship
Derry	2026	Christy Ring Cup
Donegal	2024	Nicky Rackard Cup
Down	2013	Christy Ring Cup
Dublin	2013	Leinster Senior Hurling Championship
Fermanagh	2024	Lory Meagher Cup
Galway	2026	Leinster Senior Hurling Championship
Kerry	2015	Christy Ring Cup
Kildare	2025	Joe McDonagh Cup
Kilkenny	2025	Leinster Senior Hurling Championship
Lancashire	—	N / A
Laois	2026	Joe McDonagh Cup
Leitrim	2019	Lory Meagher Cup
Limerick	2026	All-Ireland Senior Hurling Championship
London	2025	Christy Ring Cup
Longford	2026	Lory Meagher Cup
Louth	2022	Lory Meagher Cup
Mayo	2021	Nicky Rackard Cup
Meath	2023	Christy Ring Cup
Monaghan	2023	Lory Meagher Cup
New York	2026	Nicky Rackard Cup
Offaly	2024	Joe McDonagh Cup
Roscommon	2025	Nicky Rackard Cup
Sligo	2019	Nicky Rackard Cup
Tipperary	2019	All-Ireland Senior Hurling Championship
Tyrone	2022	Nicky Rackard Cup
Warwickshire	2017	Lory Meagher Cup
Waterford	2010	Munster Senior Hurling Championship
Westmeath	2021	Joe McDonagh Cup
Wexford	2019	Leinster Senior Hurling Championship
Wicklow	2023	Nicky Rackard Cup

=== List of All-Ireland Titles in every grade ===
Tier 1: All-Ireland Senior Hurling Championship

Tier 2: Joe McDonagh Cup / All-Ireland Senior B Hurling Championship

Tier 3: Christy Ring Cup / All-Ireland Intermediate Hurling Championship

Tier 4: Nicky Rackard Cup / All-Ireland Junior Hurling Championship

Tier 5: Lory Meagher Cup

As of 1 October 2025.

County	Tier 1	Tier 2	Tier 3	Tier 4	Tier 5	Total Titles
Kilkenny	36	—	5	9	—	50
Cork	30	—	9	11	—	50
Tipperary	29	—	7	9	—	45
Limerick	12	—	1	4	—	17
Wexford	6	—	4	2	—	12
Dublin	6	—	—	3	—	9
Galway	5	—	3	2	—	10
Offaly	4	1	1	2	—	8
Clare	4	—	1	2	—	7
Waterford	2	—	—	2	—	4
London	1	5	3	7	—	16
Laois	1	4	—	—	—	5
Kerry	1	3	2	2	—	8
Antrim	—	5	2	1	—	8
Kildare	—	4	6	2	—	12
Westmeath	—	4	3	1	—	8
Carlow	—	3	4	—	—	7
Meath	—	1	3	7	—	11
Roscommon	—	1	—	5	—	6
Wicklow	—	1	—	3	—	4
New York	—	1	—	—	—	1
Down	—	—	1	1	—	2
Armagh	—	—	—	5	—	5
Mayo	—	—	—	5	—	5
Derry	—	—	—	4	—	4
Warwickshire	—	—	—	3	2	5
Donegal	—	—	—	4	1	5
Louth	—	—	—	2	3	5
Tyrone	—	—	—	2	2	4
Sligo	—	—	—	2	1	3
Monaghan	—	—	—	1	1	2
Fermanagh	—	—	—	—	3	3
Longford	—	—	—	—	2	2
Leitrim	—	—	—	—	1	1
Cavan	—	—	—	—	—	0
Lancashire	—	—	—	—	—	0

=== All-Ireland Knockout Stage Appearances by County ===
The three main ways to qualify for the All-Ireland Senior Hurling Championship (Proper) are through:

1. Provincial Championships: Previously, the Connacht, Leinster, Munster and Ulster champions qualified to the All-Ireland. Now the top 3 in Leinster and Munster qualify.
2. All-Ireland Qualifiers (backdoor): Open for all teams knocked out of their provincial championships. Qualifiers are currently not used in the championship.
3. Second Tier: Previously, the All-Ireland Senior B Hurling Championship champions and recently the Joe McDonagh Cup finalists qualified. Currently no pathway used in the championship.

(Does not include Provincial Championship appearances or Qualifier appearances)

Team	Total All-Ireland KS Appearances	First All-Ireland KS Appearance	Most Recent All-Ireland KS Appearance
Connacht (3)
Galway	108	1887	2026
Mayo	1	1909	1909
Roscommon	2	1913	1994
Leinster (9)
Carlow	3	1992	2023
Dublin	38	1887	2026
Kildare	4	1974	2025
Kilkenny	87	1887	2025
Laois	8	1914	2025
Meath	1	1993	1993
Offaly	16	1980	2026
Westmeath	5	1975	2019
Wexford	34	1887	2024
Munster (6)
Clare	24	1887	2026
Cork	69	1890	2026
Kerry	5	1891	2022
Limerick	37	1897	2026
Tipperary	58	1887	2025
Waterford	21	1938	2021
Ulster (5)
Antrim	44	1900	2022
Cavan	1	1908	1908
Derry	4	1902	2001
Donegal	2	1906	1923
Down	3	1992	1997
Britain (3)
Glasgow	3	1905	1913
Lancashire	2	1905	1913
London	18	1900	1996
Other (1)
New York	1	1996	1996

=== Non-Irish teams ===
- London became the first overseas team to compete in the All-Ireland Championship in 1900. For four consecutive years they were given a bye to the All-Ireland final where they played the "home" champions in the final proper. They won their only All-Ireland title in 1901. London returned to the All-Ireland Championship on a number of occasions between 1969 and 1996.
- In 1905 Lancashire and Glasgow entered the All-Ireland Championship at the quarter-final stage. Lancashire returned for one more championship campaign in 1913 whilst Glasgow returned for the 1910 and 1913 championships.
- New York fielded a team in an expanded All-Ireland Championship in 1996.

== Other records ==
=== By decade ===
The most successful team of each decade, judged by number of All-Ireland Senior Hurling Championship titles, is as follows:

- 1890s: 4 each for Cork (1890, 1892, 1893, 1894) and Tipperary (1895, 1896, 1898, 1899)
- 1900s: 4 for Kilkenny (1904, 1905, 1907, 1909)
- 1910s: 3 for Kilkenny (1911, 1912, 1913)
- 1920s: 3 each for Dublin (1920, 1924, 1927) and Cork (1926, 1928, 1929)
- 1930s: 4 for Kilkenny (1932, 1933, 1935, 1939)
- 1940s: 5 for Cork (1941, 1942, 1943, 1944, 1946)
- 1950s: 3 each for Tipperary (1950, 1951, 1958) and Cork (1952, 1953, 1954)
- 1960s: 4 for Tipperary (1961, 1962, 1964, 1965)
- 1970s: 4 each for Cork (1970, 1976, 1977, 1978) and Kilkenny (1972, 1974, 1975, 1979)
- 1980s: 3 for Galway (1980, 1987, 1988)
- 1990s: 2 each for Cork (1990, 1999), Kilkenny (1992, 1993), Offaly (1994, 1998) and Clare (1995, 1997)
- 2000s: 7 for Kilkenny (2000, 2002, 2003, 2006, 2007, 2008, 2009)
- 2010s: 4 for Kilkenny (2011, 2012, 2014, 2015)
- 2020s: 5 for Limerick (2020, 2021, 2022, 2023, 2026)

=== Finishing positions ===
- Most championships
  - 36, Kilkenny (1904, 1905, 1907, 1909, 1911, 1912, 1913, 1922, 1932, 1933, 1935, 1939, 1947, 1957, 1963, 1967, 1969, 1972, 1974, 1975, 1979, 1982, 1983, 1992, 1993, 2000, 2002, 2003, 2006, 2007, 2008, 2009, 2011, 2012, 2014, 2015)
- Most second-place finishes
  - 29, Kilkenny (1893, 1895, 1897, 1898, 1916, 1926, 1931, 1936, 1937, 1940, 1945, 1946, 1950, 1959, 1964, 1966, 1971, 1973, 1978, 1987, 1991, 1998, 1999, 2004, 2010, 2016, 2019, 2022, 2023)
- Most semi-final finishes
  - 64, Galway
- Most quarter-final finishes
  - 13, Antrim (1910, 1971, 1972, 1978, 1981, 1982, 1983, 1998, 1999, 2002, 2003, 2004, 2010)
- Most preliminary quarter-final finishes
  - 2, Carlow (2018, 2023)
  - 2, Westmeath (2018, 2019)
  - 2, Offaly (2023, 2024)
- Most provincial group stage finishes
  - 7, Waterford (2018, 2019, 2022, 2023, 2024, 2025, 2026)
- Most qualifier round 2 finishes
  - 5, Offaly (2002, 2004, 2008, 2010, 2014)
  - 5, Cork (2002, 2009, 2011, 2016, 2020)
- Most qualifier round 1 finishes
  - 10, Laois (2003, 2004, 2008, 2013, 2014, 2015, 2016, 2017, 2020, 2021)
- Most qualifier preliminary round finishes
  - 3, Westmeath (2003, 2011, 2012)
  - 3, Laois (2010, 2011, 2012)
- Most qualifier group stage finishes
  - 3, Dublin (2005, 2006, 2007)
  - 3, Laois (2005, 2006, 2007)
  - 3, Offaly (2005, 2006, 2007)

=== Unbeaten sides ===
- Between 1887 and 1996 the championship was played on a straight knock out format whereby the All-Ireland champions were the only undefeated team of the competition.

=== Beaten sides ===
The introduction of the qualifier system in 1997 has resulted in 11 'back-door' All-Ireland champions:

- Offaly (1998) were beaten by Kilkenny in the Leinster final.
- Cork (2004) were beaten by Waterford in the Munster final.
- Tipperary (2010) were beaten by Cork in the Munster quarter-finals.
- Kilkenny (2012) were beaten by Galway in the Leinster final.
- Clare (2013) were beaten by Cork in the Munster semi-finals.
- Limerick (2018) were beaten by Clare in Munster round 4.
- Tipperary (2019) were beaten by Limerick in the Munster final.
- Limerick (2023) were beaten by Clare in Munster round 2.
- Clare (2024) were beaten twice by Limerick in the Munster round 1 and in Munster final.
- Tipperary (2025) were beaten by Cork in Munster round 2.
- Limerick (2026) were beaten by Cork in Munster round 2.

=== Final success rate ===
Only one county have appeared in the final and being victorious on all occasions:

- Kerry (1891)

On the opposite end of the scale, only one county has appeared in the final and losing on each occasion:

- Antrim (1943, 1989)

=== Winning other trophies ===
Although not an officially recognised achievement, a number of teams have achieved the distinction of winning the All-Ireland championship, their provincial championship and the National Hurling League in the same year:

- Kilkenny (1933, 1982, 1983, 2002, 2003, 2006, 2009, 2014)
- Tipperary (1949, 1950, 1961, 1964, 1965, 2001)
- Limerick (1934, 1936, 2020, 2023, 2026)
- Cork (1926, 1941, 1953)
- Galway (1987, 2017)
- Wexford (1956)

=== Biggest wins ===
- The most one sided All-Ireland finals:
  - **34 points** – 1896: Tipperary 8-14 - 0-04 Dublin
  - **29 points** – 1894: Cork 5-20 - 2-00 Dublin
  - **27 points** – 1943: Cork 5-16 - 0-04 Antrim
  - **27 points** – 1928: Cork 6-12 - 1-00 Galway
  - **26 points** – 1918: Limerick 9-05 - 1-03 Wexford
  - **23 points** – 2008: Kilkenny 3-30 - 1-13 Waterford
- The most one sided All-Ireland semi-finals:
  - **52 points** – 1900: Galway 10-23 - 0-01 Antrim
  - **44 points** – 1954: Wexford 12-17 - 2-03 Antrim
  - **36 points** – 1925: Tipperary 12-09 - 2-03 Antrim
  - **35 points** – 1912: Limerick 11-04 – 0-02 Antrim
  - **35 points** – 1904: Cork 8-18 - 2-03 Antrim
- The most one sided All-Ireland quarter-finals:
  - **36 points** – 1906: Kilkenny 7-21 - 1-03 Antrim
  - **34 points** – 1971: Galway 7-24 - 1-08 Antrim
  - **30 points** – 1986: Galway 4-24 - 1-03 Kerry
  - **26 points** – 1988: Galway 4-30 - 2-08 London
  - **26 points** – 1996: Galway 4-22 - 0-08 New York
- The most one sided Munster finals:
  - **31 points** – 1918: Limerick 11–3 – 1–2 Clare
  - **31 points** – 1982: Cork 5-31 - 3-06 Waterford
  - **28 points** – 1893: Cork 5-13 - 0-00 Limerick
  - **27 points** – 1903: Cork 5-16 - 1-01 Waterford
  - **26 points** – 1905: Cork 7-12 - 1-04 Limerick
- The most one sided Leinster finals:
  - **28 points** – 1916: Kilkenny 11-03 - 2-02 Wexford
  - **22 points** – 1954: Wexford 8-05 - 1-04 Dublin
  - **21 points** – 1901: Wexford 7-06 - 1-03 Offaly
  - **20 points** – 1913: Kilkenny 7-05 - 2-01 Dublin
  - **19 points** – 1928: Dublin 9-07 - 4-03 Offaly
- The most one sided Ulster finals:
  - **35 points** – 1906: Donegal 5–21 – 0-01 Antrim
  - **29 points** – 1901: Antrim 0-41 - 0-12 Derry
  - **28 points** – 1930: Antrim 10-04 - 2-00 Down
  - **27 points** – 1935: Antrim 7-09 - 0-03 Cavan
  - **26 points** – 2007: Antrim 2-24 - 0-04 Down
- The most one sided Connacht finals:
  - **41 points** – 1922: Galway 12-08 - 1-00 Roscommon
  - **38 points** – 1997: Galway 6–24 - 0-05 Roscommon
  - **24 points** – 1999: Galway 4-26 - 2-08 Roscommon
  - **21 points** – 1905: Galway 3-15 - 1-00 Mayo
  - **18 points** – 1909: Mayo 10-01 - 4-01 Galway

=== Scoring Events ===
As of 30 July 2026. Records exclude extra-time.

- Widest winning margin:
  - **53 points** – 1901: Offaly 10-23 - 0-00 Louth
- Most goals in a match:
  - **17** – 1945: Wicklow 7-05 - 10-06 Dublin
- Most points in a match:
  - **57** – 2022: Kilkenny 2-26 - 1-31 Limerick
  - **57** – 2024: Cork 1-28 - 0-29 Limerick
- Most goals by one team in a match:
  - **13** – 1923: Waterford 0-01 - 13-04 Cork
- Most points by one team in a match:
  - **40** – 2019: Westmeath 0-20 - 1-40 Cork
- Highest aggregate score:
  - **86 points** – 2023: Offaly 3-18 - 7-38 Tipperary
- Lowest aggregate score:
  - **4 points** – 1887: Tipperary 1-01 - 0-00 Galway

=== Successful defending ===
Only 6 teams of the 13 who have won the All-Ireland championship have ever successfully defended the title. These are:

- Kilkenny on 13 attempts out of 36 (1905, 1912, 1913, 1933, 1975, 1983, 1993, 2003, 2007, 2008, 2009, 2012, 2015)
- Cork on 12 attempts out of 30 (1893, 1894, 1903, 1929, 1942, 1943, 1944, 1953, 1954, 1977, 1978, 2005)
- Tipperary on 7 attempts out of 29 (1896, 1899, 1900, 1950, 1951, 1962, 1965)
- Limerick on 3 attempts out of 12 (2021, 2022, 2023)
- Wexford on 1 attempt out of 6 (1956)
- Galway on 1 attempt out of 5 (1988)

=== Gaps ===
- Longest gaps between successive All-Ireland titles:
  - 81 years: Clare (1914–1995)
  - 57 years: Galway (1923–1980)
  - 45 years: Wexford (1910–1955)
  - 45 years: Limerick (1973–2018)
  - 33 years: Limerick (1940–1973)
  - 29 years: Galway (1988–2017)
  - 28 years: Dublin (1889–1917)
  - 28 years: Wexford (1968–1996)
  - 21 years: Limerick (1897–1918)
- Longest gaps between successive All-Ireland final appearances:
  - 63 years: Clare (1932–1995)
  - 46 years: Antrim (1943–1989)
  - 45 years: Waterford (1963–2008)
  - 34 years: Laois (1915–1949)
  - 33 years: Wexford (1918–1951)
  - 33 years: Limerick (1940–1973)

=== Active gaps ===
- Longest active gaps between since last title:
  - 135 years: Kerry (1891–)
  - 125 years: London (1901–)
  - 111 years: Laois (1915–)
  - 88 years: Dublin (1938–)
  - 67 years: Waterford (1959–)
  - 29 years: Wexford (1996–)
  - 28 years: Offaly (1998–)
  - 21 years: Cork (2005–)
  - 11 years: Kilkenny (2015–)
  - 9 years: Galway (2017–)
  - 2 years: Clare (2024–)
  - 1 year: Tipperary (2025–)
- Longest active gaps since last All-Ireland final appearance:
  - 135 years: Kerry (1891–)
  - 123 years: London (1903–)
  - 77 years: Laois (1949–)
  - 65 years: Dublin (1961–)
  - 37 years: Antrim (1989–)
  - 30 years: Wexford (1996–)
  - 26 years: Offaly (2000–)
  - 6 years: Waterford (2020–)
  - 3 years: Kilkenny (2023–)
  - 2 year: Clare (2024–)
  - 1 year: Cork (2025–)
  - 1 year: Tipperary (2025–)
  - 0 years: Galway (2026–)
  - 0 years: Limerick (2026–)
- Longest active gap since last championship appearance
  - 123 years: Longford (1903–)
  - 113 years: Glasgow (1913–)
  - 113 years: Lancashire (1913–)
  - 113 years: Mayo (1913–)
  - 113 years: Sligo (1913–)
  - 106 years: Louth (1920–)
  - 101 years: Cavan (1925–)
  - 80 years: Donegal (1946–)
  - 80 years: Fermanagh (1946–)
  - 80 years: Monaghan (1946–)
  - 27 years: Roscommon (1999–)
  - 22 years: Derry (2004–)
  - 22 years: New York (2004–)
  - 22 years: Wicklow (2004–)
  - 12 years: London (2014–)
  - 2 years: Meath (2024–)
  - 1 year: Antrim (2025–)
  - 1 year: Carlow (2025–)
  - 1 year: Down (2025–)
  - 1 year: Laois (2025–)
  - 1 year: Kerry (2025–)
  - 1 year: Westmeath (2025–)

=== Provinces ===
- On eight occasions the All-Ireland final was involved by two teams from the same province:
  - Tipperary vs Clare (1997)
  - Kilkenny vs Offaly (1998)
  - Kilkenny vs Offaly (2000)
  - Cork vs Clare (2013)
  - Limerick vs Waterford (2020)
  - Limerick vs Cork (2021)
  - Cork vs Clare (2024)
  - Cork vs Tipperary (2025)
- Province success rates
  - Munster 100% (6 out of 6 counties)
  - Leinster 42% (5 out of 12 counties)
  - Britain 33% (1 out of 3 counties)
  - Connacht 20% (1 out of 5 counties)
  - Ulster 0% (0 out of 9 counties)

=== Counties in an All-Ireland final without a provincial title ===
Bold = Champions

- Galway (1887, **1923**, 1924, 1925, 1928, 1929, 1953, 1955, 1958, 1975, 1979, **1980**, 1981, 1985, 1986, **1987**, **1988**, 1990, 1993, 2001, 2005, 2015)
- Tipperary (**1887**, 1997, **2010**, 2014, **2019, 2025**)
- Cork (**1941**, **2004**, 2013, 2021, 2024)
- Kilkenny (2004, **2012**, 2019)
- Waterford (2008, 2017, 2020)
- Offaly (**1998**, 2000)
- Clare (2002, **2013**, **2024**)
- Limerick (2007, **2018**)

Note: The 1887, 2004, 2013, 2019 and 2024 finals featured two teams that had not won their provincial championship that year (There were no provincial championships in 1887).

=== All-Ireland final pairings ===
Pairing	Meetings	First meeting	Last meeting
Cork v Kilkenny	22	1888	2006
Kilkenny v Tipperary	20	1895	2019
Kilkenny v Limerick	10	1897	2023
Cork v Dublin	9	1892	1952
Cork v Galway	6	1928	2005
Cork v Wexford	6	1890	1976
Dublin v Tipperary	6	1896	1961
Kilkenny v Galway	6	1975	2015
Tipperary v Wexford	6	1899	1968
Galway v Tipperary	5	1887	2001
Kilkenny v Waterford	4	1957	2008
Galway v Limerick	4	1923	2026
Cork v London	3	1901	1903
Limerick v Wexford	3	1910	1996
Clare v Cork	2	2013	2024
Clare v Kilkenny	2	1932	2002
Dublin v Limerick	2	1921	1934
Dublin v Waterford	2	1938	1948
Galway v Offaly	2	1981	1985
Kilkenny v Offaly	2	1998	2000
Antrim v Cork	1	1943	
Antrim v Tipperary	1	1989	
Clare v Dublin	1	1889	
Clare v Laois	1	1914	
Clare v Offaly	1	1995	
Clare v Tipperary	1	1997	
Cork v Laois	1	1915	
Cork v Limerick	1	2021	
Cork v Offaly	1	1984	
Cork v Tipperary	1	2025	
Dublin v Galway	1	1924	
Galway v Waterford	1	2017	
Galway v Wexford	1	1955	
Kerry v Wexford	1	1891	
Laois v Tipperary	1	1949	
Limerick v Offaly	1	1994	
Limerick v Waterford	1	2020	
London v Tipperary	1	1900	

=== Longest undefeated run ===
- 21 games - Kilkenny (2006-2010): The record for the longest unbeaten run stands at 21 games held by Kilkenny. It began with a 1–23 to 1–9 win against Westmeath in their opening game of the 2006 championship and finished with a 3–22 to 0–19 win against Cork in the All-Ireland semi-final of the 2010 championship. The 21-game unbeaten streak, which included no drawn game, ended with a 4–17 to 1–18 loss to Tipperary in the 2010 All-Ireland final.
- 17 games - Limerick (2020-2023): From 2020 to 2023, Limerick were undefeated in 17 consecutive games, 16 wins and 1 draw, starting with the opening game win against Clare of the 2020 Championship 0–36 to 1-23, up to the second game of the 2023 Championship, where they lost to Clare, 1–24 to 2-20.
- 16 games - Tipperary (1949-1952): Kilkenny in 2010 broke the previous record of 16 consecutive games unbeaten by Tipperary, which began in May 1949 with a victory in the opening round of the championship, and ended with a seventeen-point defeat of Waterford in the Munster semi-final of the 1952 championship. The 16-game unbeaten streak, which included 15 wins and one draw, ended with a 1–11 to 2–6 loss to Cork in the subsequent Munster final.

=== Miscellaneous ===
As of 2024 championship.

- Best finish by a debuting team
  - Champions, Tipperary (1887)
- Highest winning record in final (3 or more finals)
  - 68%, Tipperary (28 wins in 41 matches)
- Lowest winning record in final (3 or more finals)
  - 20%, Galway (5 wins in 25 matches)
- Most played match
  - Dublin v Kilkenny (92 times)
  - Cork v Tipperary (89 times)

== Managers ==
=== Winning managers (2000 – present) ===
#	Manager(s)	Winning team(s)	Titles(s)	Winning years
1	Brian Cody	Kilkenny	11	2000, 2002, 2003, 2006, 2007, 2008, 2009, 2011, 2012, 2014, 2015
2	John Kiely	Limerick	6	2018, 2020, 2021, 2022, 2023, 2026
3	Liam Sheedy	Tipperary	2	2010, 2019
4	Nicky English	Tipperary	1	2001
4	Dónal O'Grady	Cork	1	2004
4	John Allen	Cork	1	2005
4	Davy Fitzgerald	Clare	1	2013
4	Michael Ryan	Tipperary	1	2016
4	Micheál Donoghue	Galway	1	2017
4	Brian Lohan	Clare	1	2024

=== Managerial Records ===
Danny O'Connell was the main trainer for the Kilkenny Senior Hurling team in the early years of the G.A.A and managed to win twelve All-Ireland senior titles, in 1904, 1905, 1907, 1909, 1911, 1912, 1913, 1922, 1932, 1933, 1935 and 1939.

- Brian Cody is the only manager to win the All-Ireland title eleven times, in 2000, 2002, 2003, 2006, 2007, 2008, 2009, 2011, 2012, 2014, 2015 (all Kilkenny).
- Just three managers have reached the All-Ireland final with two different teams:
  - Michael "Babs" Keating with Galway (1979) and Tipperary (1988, 1989, 1991).
  - Davy Fitzgerald with Waterford (2008) and Clare (2013).
  - Liam Cahill with Waterford (2020) and Tipperary (2025).
- In 2009, Justin McCarthy became the first manager to reach the All-Ireland semi-finals with three different teams: Cork (1975, 1984), Waterford (2002, 2004, 2006, 2007) and Limerick (2009). In addition, he was in charge of Clare in the 1978 Munster final, when a win would have qualified them directly for the all-Ireland final.
- Fourteen individuals have won the All-Ireland as a player then later as a manager:
  - Johnny Clifford of Cork won as a player in 1954 and as a manager in 1986.
  - Ollie Walsh of Kilkenny won as a player in 1957, 1963, 1967 and 1969 and as a manager in 1992, and 1993.
  - Michael "Babs" Keating of Tipperary won as a player in 1964, 1965 and 1971 and as a manager in 1989 and 1991.
  - Eddie Keher of Kilkenny won as a player in 1963, 1967, 1969, 1972, 1974 and 1975 and as a co-manager in 1979.
  - Justin McCarthy of Cork won as a player in 1966 and as a co-manager in 1984.
  - Pat Henderson of Kilkenny won as a player in 1967, 1969, 1972, 1974 and 1975 and as a manager in 1979, 1982 and 1983.
  - Brian Cody of Kilkenny won as a player in 1975, 1982 and 1983 and as a manager in 2000, 2002, 2003, 2006, 2007, 2008, 2009, 2011, 2012, 2014, 2015
  - Jimmy Barry-Murphy of Cork won as a player in 1976, 1977, 1978, 1984 and 1986 and as a manager in 1999.
  - John Allen of Cork won as a player in 1978 and as a manager in 2005.
  - Dónal O'Grady of Cork won as a player in 1984 and as a manager in 2004.
  - Nicky English of Tipperary won as a player in 1989 and 1991 and as a manager in 2001.
  - Davy Fitzgerald of Clare won as a player in 1995 and 1997 and as a manager in 2013.
  - Eamonn Cregan of Limerick won as a player in 1973 and as a manager with Offaly in 1994.
  - Michael Ryan of Tipperary won as a player in 1991 and as a manager in 2016.
  - Brian Lohan of Clare won as a player in 1995 and 1997 and as a manager in 2024.

== Players ==
=== All-time top scorers ===
As of match played 19 July 2026 (21:00)

All-time top scorers in the All-Ireland Senior Hurling Championship
Rank	Player	Team	Goals	Points	Tally	Games	Era	Average
1	T. J. Reid	Kilkenny	43	672	801	99	2008–2026	8.0
2	Patrick Horgan	Cork	32	683	779	90	2008–2025	8.6
3	Joe Canning	Galway	27	486	567	62	2008–2021	9.3
4	Henry Shefflin	Kilkenny	27	484	565	71	1999–2014	8.0
5	Lee Chin	Wexford	15	396	441	64	2011–present	6.8
6	Eddie Keher	Kilkenny	35	336	441	50	1959–1977	8.8
7	Eoin Kelly	Tipperary	21	369	432	63	2000–2014	6.8
8	Tony Kelly	Clare	18	370	419	71	2012–present	5.8
9	Aaron Gillane	Limerick	20	330	390	52	2017–present	7.8
10	Donal Burke	Dublin	8	332	356	39	2017–present	9.1
11	Jason Forde	Tipperary	15	299	344	57	2013–present	6.0
12	Séamus Callanan	Tipperary	40	226	343	66	2008–2023	5.1
13	Christy Ring	Cork	33	208	307	65	1940–1963	4.7
14	Stephen Bennett	Waterford	17	248	299	47	2014–present	6.3
15	D. J. Carey	Kilkenny	33	188	287	57	1989–2005	5.0
16	Shane Dooley	Offaly	20	218	278	42	2008–present	6.8
17	Nicky Rackard	Wexford	59	96	273	36	1940–1957	7.6
18	Joe Deane	Cork	10	237	267	50	1996–2008	5.3
19	Conor Cooney	Galway	18	215	269	73	2012–present	3.6
20	Niall Gilligan	Clare	21	197	257	56	1997–2009	4.6
21	Ben O'Connor	Cork	8	230	254	62	1999–2012	4.1
22	Paul Flynn	Waterford	24	181	253	45	1993–2008	5.6
23	Cathal Mannion	Galway	8	210	234	69	2014–present	3.4
24	Jimmy Doyle	Tipperary	18	176	230	39	1958–1973	5.9
25	Eoin Kelly	Waterford	14	187	229	44	2002–2013	5.3
26	Charlie McCarthy	Cork	24	149	221	45	1965–1980	5.3
27	James Young	Laois	8	191	215	31	2000–2009	6.9
28	Shane Dowling	Limerick	13	176	215	33	2012–2020	6.5
29	Paul Ryan	Dublin	8	188	212	38	2008–2020	5.6
30	Johnny Dooley	Offaly	4	199	211	35	1991–2002	6.0
31	Brian Carroll	Offaly	5	192	207	49	2002–2016	4.2
32	Pauric Mahony	Waterford	1	201	204	28	2011–2022	7.3
33	Noel McGrath	Tipperary	5	189	204	81	2009–present	2.5
34	Conor McDonald	Wexford	22	135	201	57	2013–present	3.5
35	Peter Duggan	Clare	8	174	198	50	2012–present	3.9
36	Jim Langton	Kilkenny	15	146	191	43	1938–1954	4.4
37	Gary Kirby	Limerick	8	165	189	30	1987–1999	6.3
38	Conor Whelan	Galway	16	140	188	64	2015–present	2.9
39	Mick Mackey	Limerick	33	86	185	40	1932–1947	4.6
40	Séamus Harnedy	Cork	9	153	180	65	2011–present	2.7
41	John Mullane	Waterford	15	134	179	47	2001–2012	3.8
42	Éamonn Cregan	Limerick	27	97	178	40	1965–1983	4.4
43	Nicky English	Tipperary	20	117	177	35	1982–1996	5.0
44	Tony Doran	Wexford	40	56	176	40	1967–1984	4.4
45	Matty Power	Kilkenny	46	38	176	52	1920–1937	3.3
46	Martin Kennedy	Tipperary	54	10	172	36	1923–1935	4.8
47	Lar Corbett	Tipperary	29	80	167	61	2000–2015	2.7
48	Diarmaid Byrnes	Limerick	6	154	172	58	2015–present	2.9
49	Martin Kavanagh	Carlow	5	147	162	24	2012-present	6.8
50	Eoin Larkin	Kilkenny	8	134	158	58	2005–2016	2.7
51	Eugene Cloonan	Galway	14	116	158	22	1997–2008	7.1
52	John Fenton	Cork	8	132	156	31	1975–1987	5.0
53	Jamesie O'Connor	Clare	2	148	154	42	1992–2004	3.6
54	Tom Morrissey	Limerick	2	146	152	59	2015–present	2.6
55	Paddy Molloy	Offaly	25	76	151	25	1955-1971	6.0
56	Tony O'Sullivan	Cork	1	143	146	39	1982–1995	3.7
57	Conor Lehane	Cork	5	131	146	60	2011–present	2.4
58	John McGrath	Tipperary	22	79	145	47	2015–present	3.0
59	Damien Hayes	Galway	20	85	145	52	2001–2014	2.7
60	Ger Farragher	Galway	6	127	145	33	2002–2011	4.4
61	Paul Codd	Wexford	5	127	142	32	1995–2006	4.4
62	Maurice Shanahan	Waterford	7	121	142	37	2009–2019	3.8
63	Eddie Brennan	Kilkenny	26	63	141	48	2000–2011	2.9
64	Michael Cleary	Tipperary	10	108	138	26	1988–1997	5.3
65	Gearóid Hegarty	Limerick	9	110	137	58	2016–present	2.4
66	Tim Flood	Wexford	26	59	137	38	1947–1962	3.6
67	Pat Fox	Tipperary	13	98	137	37	1980–1996	3.7
68	John O'Dwyer	Tipperary	8	110	134	37	2013–2023	3.6
69	Joe Cooney	Galway	10	102	132	35	1983–2000	3.7
70	Shane O'Donnell	Clare	16	82	130	63	2013–present	2.0
71	Eoin Cody	Kilkenny	14	84	126	34	2020–present	3.7
72	Andrew O'Shaughnessy	Limerick	8	102	126	33	2002–2011	3.8
73	Tommy Dunne	Tipperary	6	106	124	44	1993–2005	2.8
74	Aidan McCarthy	Clare	5	108	123	26	2019–present	4.7
75	Seánie O'Leary	Cork	30	33	123	36	1971–1984	3.4
76	Richie Power	Kilkenny	14	81	123	42	2005–2015	2.9
77	Jimmy Barry Murphy	Cork	23	52	121	40	1975–1986	3.0
78	Dan Shanahan	Waterford	21	58	121	52	1995–2010	2.3
79	Niall Moran	Limerick	7	97	118	44	2003-2013	2.7
80	Martin Keoghan	Kilkenny	19	59	116	46	2018–present	2.5
81	Dessie Hutchinson	Waterford	5	97	112	?	2020–present	0.0
82	Darragh Fitzgibbon	Cork	4	99	111	49	2017–present	2.2
83	Shane Kingston	Cork	8	79	103	48	2016–present	2.1
84	Colin Fennelly	Kilkenny	13	63	102	51	2011–2020	2.0

=== All-time appearances ===
As of match played 19 July 2026

Player	Team	Appearances	Era
T. J. Reid	Kilkenny	99	2008–2026
Patrick Horgan	Cork	90	2008–2025
Noel McGrath	Tipperary	82	2009–
Nicky Quaid	Limerick	82	2010-
Michael "Brick" Walsh	Waterford	76	2003–2019
Eoin Murphy	Kilkenny	74	2011–2026
Brendan Cummins	Tipperary	73	1995–2013
Conor Cooney	Galway	73	2012–
Henry Shefflin	Kilkenny	71	1999–2014
David Burke	Galway	71	2009-2025
John Conlon	Clare	72	2009–
Tony Kelly	Clare	71	2012–
Séamus Harnedy	Cork	68	2011-2026
Declan Hannon	Limerick	67	2011-2025
J. J. Delaney	Kilkenny	66	2001–2014
Séamus Callanan	Tipperary	66	2008–2023
Tony Browne	Waterford	65	1992–2014
Christy Ring	Cork	65	1940–1962
Graeme Mulcahy	Limerick	64	2009-2024
Eoin Kelly	Tipperary	63	2000–2014
Joe Canning	Galway	62	2008-2021
Ben O'Connor	Cork	62	1999–2012
Pádraic Maher	Tipperary	60	2009–2022
Lar Corbett	Tipperary	60	2001–2015
Davy Fitzgerald	Clare	60	1989–2005
Dan Morrissey	Limerick	62	2014
Richie Hogan	Kilkenny	58	2008–2023
Brendan Maher	Tipperary	58	2009–2021
Frank Lohan	Clare	58	1995–2008
Donal Óg Cusack	Cork	58	1996–2011
Joe Dooley	Offaly	58	1982–2000
Eoin Larkin	Kilkenny	58	2005–2016
Conor McDonald	Wexford	57	2013-
Seán Óg Ó hAilpín	Cork	57	1996–2012
D. J. Carey	Kilkenny	57	1989–2005
Tom Morrissey	Limerick	59	2015
Jason Forde	Tipperary	57	2013-
Ronan Maher	Tipperary	57	2014–
Tommy Walsh	Kilkenny	56	2003–2014
Cillian Buckley	Kilkenny	56	2012–2024
Damien Fitzhenry	Wexford	56	1993–2009
Niall Gilligan	Clare	56	1997–2009
Gearóid Hegarty	Limerick	58	2016
Brian Whelahan	Offaly	55	1989–2006
Diarmaid Byrnes	Limerick	57	2016
John Doyle	Tipperary	54	1949–1967
Brian Lohan	Clare	54	1993–2006
Cian Lynch	Limerick	57	2015
Tom Kenny	Cork	53	2003–2013
Dan Shanahan	Waterford	52	1998–2010
Damien Hayes	Galway	52	2001–2014
Matty Power	Kilkenny Dublin	52	1920–1937
Seánie McMahon	Clare	51	1994–2006
Colin Fennelly	Kilkenny	51	2011–2021
Ger Cunningham	Cork	50	1982–1998
Joe Deane	Cork	50	1996–2008
Eddie Keher	Kilkenny	50	1959–1977
Niall McCarthy	Cork	50	2002–2012

=== All-time championship goal scorers (minimum 20 goals) ===
As of match played 16 April 2026

Rank	Player	Team	Goals	Games	Era	Average per game
1	Nicky Rackard	Wexford	59	36	1940–1957	1.63
2	Martin Kennedy	Tipperary	54	36	1923–1935	1.50
3	Matty Power	Kilkenny	46	52	1920–1937	0.88
4	T. J. Reid	Kilkenny	43	99	2008–2026	0.43
5	Tony Doran	Wexford	40	40	1967–1984	1.00
6	Séamus Callanan	Tipperary	40	66	2008–2023	0.60
7	Eddie Keher	Kilkenny	35	50	1959–1977	0.70
8	Christy Ring	Cork	33	65	1940–1963	0.50
9	D. J. Carey	Kilkenny	33	57	1989–2005	0.57
10	Mick Mackey	Limerick	33	40	1932–1947	0.82
11	Patrick Horgan	Cork	32	89	2008–2025	0.36
12	Seánie O'Leary	Cork	30	36	1971–1984	0.83
13	Lar Corbett	Tipperary	29	61	2000–2015	0.47
14	Joe Canning	Galway	27	62	2008–2021	0.43
15	Henry Shefflin	Kilkenny	27	71	1999–2014	0.38
16	Éamonn Cregan	Limerick	27	40	1965–1983	0.67
17	Eddie Brennan	Kilkenny	26	48	2000–2011	0.54
18	Tim Flood	Wexford	26	38	1947–1962	0.68
19	Paddy Molloy	Offaly	25	25	1955-1971	1.00
20	Paul Flynn	Waterford	24	45	1993–2008	0.53
21	Charlie McCarthy	Cork	24	45	1965–1980	0.53
22	Jimmy Barry Murphy	Cork	23	40	1975–1986	0.57
23	Seán McLoughlin	Tipperary	22	26	1958-1969	0.84
24	John McGrath	Tipperary	22	45	2015–present	0.48
25	Conor McDonald	Wexford	22	57	2013–present	0.38
26	Liam Fennelly	Kilkenny	21	31	1981–1992	0.67
27	Niall Gilligan	Clare	21	56	1997–2009	0.37
28	Dan Shanahan	Waterford	21	52	1995–2010	0.40
29	Eoin Kelly	Tipperary	21	63	2000–2014	0.33
30	Shane Dooley	Offaly	20	42	2008–2023	0.47
31	Nicky English	Tipperary	20	35	1982–1996	0.57
32	Damien Hayes	Galway	20	52	2001–2014	0.38
33	Aaron Gillane	Limerick	20	49	2017-present	0.41

=== Other records ===
==== Most wins ====
- Henry Shefflin from Kilkenny is the only player to win ten All-Ireland medals on the field of play: 2000, 2002, 2003, 2006, 2007, 2008, 2009, 2011, 2012, 2014
- Five players have won nine All-Ireland medals through a combination of being on the field and as non-playing substitutes:
  - Noel Hickey of Kilkenny: 2000, 2002, 2003, 2006, 2007, 2008, 2009, 2011, 2012
  - Noel Skehan of Kilkenny: 1963, 1967, 1969, 1972, 1974, 1975, 1979, 1982, 1983
  - J.J. Delaney of Kilkenny: 2002, 2003, 2006, 2007, 2008, 2009, 2011, 2012, 2014
  - Tommy Walsh of Kilkenny: 2002, 2003, 2006, 2007, 2008, 2009, 2011, 2012, 2014
  - Jackie Tyrrell of Kilkenny: 2003, 2006, 2007, 2008, 2009, 2011, 2012, 2014, 2015
- Winners of All-Ireland medals on the field of play in three decades::
  - Paddy 'Balty' Ahern (Cork) (1919, 1926, 1927, 1929, 1931)
  - Frank Cummins (Kilkenny) (1969, 1972, 1974, 1975, 1979, 1982, 1983)
  - Jimmy Doyle (Tipperary) (1958, 1961, 1962, 1964, 1965, 1971)
  - John Doyle (Tipperary) (1949, 1950, 1951, 1958, 1961, 1962, 1964, 1965)
  - Tommy Doyle (Tipperary) (1937, 1945, 1949, 1950, 1951)
  - Declan Ryan (Tipperary) (1989, 1991, 2001)

==== All-Ireland final appearances ====
Rank	Player	Team	Appearances	Finals
1	Henry Shefflin	Kilkenny	15	1999, 2000, 2002, 2003, 2004, 2006, 2007, 2008, 2009, 2010, 2011, 2012 (draw), 2012 (replay), 2014 (draw), 2014 (replay).
2	T. J. Reid	Kilkenny	13	2008, 2009, 2010, 2011, 2012 (draw), 2012 (replay), 2014 (draw), 2014 (replay), 2015, 2016, 2019, 2022, 2023
3	Eoin Larkin	Kilkenny	12	2006, 2007, 2008, 2009, 2010, 2011, 2012 (draw), 2012 (replay), 2014 (draw), 2014 (replay), 2015, 2016
4	J. J. Delaney	Kilkenny	12	2002, 2003, 2004, 2007, 2008, 2009, 2010, 2011, 2012 (draw), 2012 (replay), 2014 (draw), 2014 (replay).
5	Richie Hogan	Kilkenny	12	2009, 2010, 2011, 2012 (draw), 2012 (replay), 2014 (draw), 2014 (replay), 2015, 2016, 2019, 2022, 2023
6	Richie Power	Kilkenny	11	2006, 2007, 2008, 2009, 2010, 2011, 2012 (draw), 2012 (replay), 2014 (draw), 2014 (replay), 2015
7	Jackie Tyrrell	Kilkenny	10	2006, 2007, 2008, 2009, 2010, 2011, 2012 (draw), 2012 (replay), 2014 (draw), 2014 (replay)
8	Tommy Walsh	Kilkenny	10	2003, 2004, 2006, 2007, 2008, 2009, 2010, 2011, 2012 (draw), 2012 (replay)
9	Noel Hickey	Kilkenny	10	2000, 2002, 2003, 2004, 2006, 2007, 2008, 2010, 2011, 2012 (replay)
10	Eddie Brennan	Kilkenny	10	2000, 2002, 2003, 2004, 2006, 2007, 2008, 2009, 2010, 2011
11	Michael Kavanagh	Kilkenny	10	1998, 1999, 2000, 2002, 2003, 2004, 2006, 2007, 2008, 2009
12	Frank Cummins	Kilkenny	10	1969, 1971, 1972, 1973, 1974, 1975, 1978, 1979, 1982, 1983
13	Eddie Keher	Kilkenny	10	1959, 1963, 1964, 1966, 1967, 1969, 1971, 1972, 1974, 1975
14	John Doyle	Tipperary	10	1949, 1950, 1951, 1958, 1960, 1961, 1962, 1964, 1965, 1967
15	Christy Ring	Cork	10	1941, 1942, 1943, 1944, 1946, 1947, 1952, 1953, 1954, 1956
16	Matty Power	Kilkenny; Dublin	10	1922, 1927, 1930, 1931 (draw), 1931 (replay), 1931 (second replay), 1932, 1933, 1935, 1937
17	D. J. Carey	Kilkenny	9	1991, 1992, 1993, 1998, 1999, 2000, 2002, 2003, 2004
18	Michael Fennelly	Kilkenny	9	2007, 2009, 2010, 2011, 2012 (draw), 2012 (replay), 2014 (draw), 2014 (replay), 2015
19	Sim Walton	Kilkenny	9	1904, 1905 (objection), 1905 (replay), 1907, 1909, 1911, 1912, 1913, 1916

==== Single All-Ireland final top scorers ====
Rank	Player	Team	Score	Final
1.	Mick 'Gah' Ahern	Cork	5–2 (17pts)	1928 v. Galway
2.	Nicky English	Tipperary	2–12 (18pts)	1989 v. Antrim
3.	Eddie Keher	Kilkenny	2–11 (17pts)	1971 v. Tipperary
4.	Darragh McCarthy	Tipperary	1-13 (16 pts)	2025 v. Cork
5.	Eddie Keher	Kilkenny	0–14 (14pts)	1963 v. Waterford
5.	Eddie Keher	Kilkenny	1–11 (14pts)	1974 v. Limerick

==== Cumulative All-Ireland final top scorers ====
As of 19 July 2026 (18:00)

Rank	Player	Team	Scores	Total
1.	Henry Shefflin	Kilkenny	5–81	96
2.	Eddie Keher	Kilkenny	7–74	95
3.	T. J. Reid	Kilkenny	2–71	77
4.	Joe Canning	Galway	3–45	54
5.	Jimmy Doyle	Tipperary	1–43	46
6.	Charlie McCarthy	Cork	3–35	44
7.	D. J. Carey	Kilkenny	4–32	44
8.	Christy Ring	Cork	3–34	43
9.	Séamus Callanan	Tipperary	3–32	41
10.	Aaron Gillane	Limerick	1–34	37
11.	Eoin Kelly	Tipperary	0–35	35

==== Longest lived All-Ireland medal winners ====
===== 100+ =====
Rank	Player	Team	Career	All-Ireland medals	Birth date	Death date	Age
1	Jim Power	Galway	1918–1928	1923	7 November 1895	21 May 1998	102 years, 195 days
2	Martin White	Kilkenny	1931–1938	1932, 1933, 1935	31 July 1909	12 October 2011	102 years, 73 days
3	John Coffey	Tipperary	1940–1948	1945	14 January 1918	11 August 2019	101 years, 209 days
4	Jimmy Coffey	Tipperary	1932–1940	1937	26 October 1909	29 December 2010	101 years, 64 days
5	Jimmy Lynam	Cork	1950–1953	1952, 1953	1 October 1925	23 August 2026	100 years, 326 days

===== 90+ =====
Rank	Player	Team	Career	All-Ireland medals	Birth date	Death date	Age
	Jack Carroll	Laois	1899-1922	1915	5 March 1878	16 September 1977	99 years, 195 days
	Tommy Cooke	Limerick	1939–1941	1940	16 August 1914	13 February 2014	99 years, 181 days
	Mick Murphy	Tipperary; Clare	1943–1949	1945	11 August 1918	1 January 2018	99 years, 143 days
	John T. Power	Kilkenny	1907–1925	1907, 1911, 1912, 1913	14 April 1883	1 February 1982	98 years, 293 days
	Colman O'Donovan	Cork	1951–1952	1952	1927	7 April 2025	97 years
	Johnny Everard	Tipperary	1950	1950	16 April 1924	25 May 2021	97 years, 39 days
	Danny Ryan	Tipperary	1887	1887	23 April 1870	31 December 1966	96 years, 252 days
	Larry Flaherty	Cork	1900–1917	1903	26 May 1882	5 January 1979	96 years, 224 days
	Tony Reddin	Tipperary	1948–1957	1949, 1950, 1951	22 November 1919	1 March 2015	95 years, 99 days
	Garrett Howard	Limerick; Dublin	1921–1936	1921, 1924, 1927, 1934, 1936	10 December 1899	20 January 1995	95 years, 41 days
	Andy Fleming	Waterford	1939–1950	1948	23 April 1916	27 March 2011	94 years, 338 days
	Dick Rockett	Kilkenny	1953-1959	1957	1931		95 years
	Paddy O'Carroll	Kerry	1891	1891	17 February 1866	29 December 1960	94 years, 316 days
	Mick Neville	Wexford	1904–1918	1910	26 February 1887	26 December 1981	94 years, 303 days
	Tom Duffy	Tipperary	1923–1927	1925	4 May 1894	24 February 1989	94 years, 296 days
	Jimmy Finn	Tipperary	1949–1960	1950, 1951, 1958	16 November 1931		94 years, 348 days
	E. D. Ryan	Tipperary	1896–1898	1896, 1898	18 May 1874	18 February 1969	94 years, 276 days
	John O'Grady	Tipperary	1958	1958	14 January 1931	6 December 2024	93 years, 327 days
	Flor Coffey	Tipperary	1943–1953	1945, 1949	10 June 1920	24 April 2014	93 years, 318 days
	Tom Mahony	Cork	1902-1907	1902	26 February 1877	5 January 1971	93 years, 313 days
	Tony Herbert	Limerick	1939–1943; 1944–1954	1940	9 August 1920	6 March 2014	93 years, 209 days
	Connie Buckley	Cork	1934–1942	1941	24 November 1915	27 January 2009	93 years, 64 days
	Mickey Byrne	Tipperary	1945–1960	1949, 1950, 1951, 1958	2 September 1923	16 October 2016	93 years, 44 days
	Pa McInerney	Clare; Dublin	1913–1933	1914, 1927	14 December 1893	15 January 1987	93 years, 32 days
	Ned Kavanagh	Kilkenny	1947	1947	25 February 1925	17 March 2018	93 years, 20 days
	Matt Hassett	Tipperary	1960–1963	1961, 1962	1932	2 April 2025	93 years
	Willie John Daly	Cork	1947–1957	1952, 1953, 1954	25 January 1925	29 November 2017	92 years, 308 days
	Frank Burke	Dublin	1917–1923	1917, 1920	8 April 1895	28 December 1987	92 years, 264 days
	John Roberts	Kilkenny	1917–1928	1922	24 June 1895	9 December 1987	92 years, 168 days
	Bobby O'Regan	Cork	1942–1946	1942	10 June 1920	17 November 2012	92 years, 160 days
	Tony Wall	Tipperary	1953–1967	1958, 1961, 1962, 1964, 1965	9 May 1934		92 years, 174 days
	P. J. Garvan	Kilkenny	1949–1957	1957	1928	23 February 2021	92 years
	Shem Downey	Kilkenny	1946–1954	1947	5 January 1922	22 December 2013	91 years, 351 days
	Paddy Collins	Cork	1928–1938	1929, 1931	12 April 1903	17 February 1995	91 years, 311 days
	Willie Wall	Tipperary	1936–1946	1937	5 September 1912	17 April 2004	91 years, 225 days
	Mick Flannelly	Waterford	1949-1965	1959	21 February 1930	11 September 2021	91 years, 202 days
	Billy Stanton	Cork	1929–1933	1929, 1931	20 January 1904	3 January 1995	90 years, 348 days
	Rody Nealon	Tipperary	1925–1926	1925	16 January 1898	29 November 1988	90 years, 318 days
	Art Foley	Wexford	1946–1957	1955, 1956	14 December 1928	28 October 2019	90 years, 318 days
	Denis O'Gorman	Tipperary	1934–1942	1937	28 August 1914	1 May 2005	90 years, 246 days
	Tom Wall	Tipperary	1936–1945	1945	19 August 1914	15 April 2005	90 years, 239 days
	Din Joe Buckley	Cork	1940–1949	1941, 1942, 1943, 1944, 1946	19 March 1919	8 October 2009	90 years, 203 days
	Theo English	Tipperary	1953-1967	1958, 1961, 1962, 1964, 1965	5 July 1930	10 January 2021	90 years, 189 days
	Tom Dwan	Tipperary	1912–1924	1916	22 November 1889	17 May 1980	90 years, 177 days

==== Disciplinary ====
At least ten players have been sent off in an All-Ireland final: Dick Carroll of Kilkenny and John Barron of Waterford in the 1959 final replay, Tom Ryan of Tipperary and Lar Foley of Dublin in the 1961 final, Éamonn Scallan of Wexford in the 1996 final; Benny Dunne of Tipperary in the 2009 final, Cyril Donnellan of Galway in the 2012 final replay, Richie Hogan of Kilkenny in the 2019 final, Eoin Downey of Cork in the 2025 final and Ronan Glennon of Galway in the 2026 final.

== See also ==
- All-Ireland Senior Hurling Championship
- All-Ireland Senior Football Championship records and statistics
