= 1895 All-Ireland Senior Hurling Championship =

All-Ireland champions
- Winning team: Tipperary (2nd win)
- Captain: Mikey Maher

All-Ireland Finalists
- Losing team: Kilkenny
- Captain: James Grace

Provincial champions
- Munster: Tipperary
- Leinster: Kilkenny
- Ulster: Not Played
- Connacht: Not Played

Championship statistics
- All-Star Team: See here

The All-Ireland Senior Hurling Championship 1895 was the ninth series of the All-Ireland Senior Hurling Championship, Ireland's premier hurling knock-out competition. Tipperary won the championship, beating Kilkenny 6–8 to 1–10 in the final.

== Teams ==
=== General information ===
Six counties competed in the All-Ireland Senior Hurling Championship: two teams in the Leinster Senior Hurling Championship and four teams in the Munster Senior Hurling Championship.

County	Province	Appearance	Position in 1894 Championship	Provincial Titles	Last provincial title	Championship Titles	Last championship title
Dublin	Leinster	9th	Runners-up	3	1894	1	1889
Kerry	Munster	7th	Semi-finals (Munster Senior Hurling Championship)	1	1891	1	1891
Kilkenny	Leinster	6th	–	1	1888	0	–
Limerick	Munster	7th	Semi-finals (Munster Senior Hurling Championship)	0	–	0	–
Tipperary	Munster	6th	Runners-up (Munster Senior Hurling Championship)	0	–	1	1887
Waterford	Munster	4th	–	0	–	0	–

== Format ==
All-Ireland Championship

Final: (1 match) The two provincial representatives make up the two final teams with the winners being declared All-Ireland champions.

== Provincial championships ==
=== Leinster Senior Hurling Championship ===
3 November 1895
Final

Kilkenny	1–5 – 0–5	Dublin

Clonturk Park, Dublin

=== Munster Senior Hurling Championship ===
Semi-final

Tipperary	w.o – scr.	Waterford

Semi-final

Limerick	1–2 – 0–4	Kerry

Final

Limerick	0–2 – 7–8	Tipperary

Kilmallock

== All-Ireland Senior Hurling Championship ==
=== Final ===
15 March 1896
Final

Tipperary	6–8 – 1–10	Kilkenny

Jones's Road, Dublin
Attendance: c.8,000
Referee: J.J. Kenny (Dublin)

== Championship statistics ==
=== Miscellaneous ===
- Cork did not field a team in this year's championship as a protest over the awarding of the 1893 All-Ireland football championship to Dublin.

== Sources ==
- Corry, Eoghan, The GAA Book of Lists (Hodder Headline Ireland, 2005).
- Donegan, Des, The Complete Handbook of Gaelic Games (DBA Publications Limited, 2005).
