= Nicholas O'Shea =

Irish hurler (1864–1912)

Personal information
- Native name: Nioclás Ó Sé (Irish)
- Born: 25 April 1864 Carrick-on-Suir, County Tipperary, Ireland
- Died: 12 March 1912 (aged 47) Dublin, Ireland
- Occupation: Publican

Sport
- Sport: Hurling
- Position: Midfield
Club
- Years: Club
- Kickham's
Club titles
- Dublin titles: 2
Inter-county
- Years: County
- 1888–1890: Dublin
Inter-county titles
- Leinster titles: 1
- All-Irelands: 1

Nicholas O'Shea (25 April 1864 – 12 March 1912) was an Irish hurler who played as midfielder for the Dublin senior team.

O'Shea joined the team during the ill-fated 1888 championship and was a regular member of the starting fifteen until his retirement after the 1890 championship. During that time he won one All-Ireland medal and one Leinster medal. O'Shea captained the team to the All-Ireland title in 1889.

At club level O'Shea was a two-time county club championship medalist with Kickham's.

== Playing career ==
=== Club ===
After moving to Dublin O'Shea started hurling with the Kickham's club and enjoyed much success. In 1889 he won a county senior championship title as Kickham's emerged as the top club in the capital. O'Shea added a second county title to his collection in 1890 when Kickham's retained their county champions status.

=== Inter-county ===
O'Shea was a key member of the very first Dublin team to represent the county in 1888. That year "the Metropolitans" reached the final of the very first Leinster Championship with Kilkenny providing the opposition. A low-scoring game developed over the course of the hour, with victory going to 'the Cats' by 0-7 to 0-3.

In 1889 O'Shea was appointed captain of the Dublin senior hurling team. That year his team only had to play one game to be declared provincial champions. After defeating Wexford O'Shea's team were give a walkover by Laois in the Leinster final. Dublin's next game was an All-Ireland final meeting with Clare. All did not go to plan as O'Shea's side trailed by 1-5 to 1-0 at the interval. Heavy rain spoiled the match and made the surface very slippery as the Clare men played in their bare feet. Dublin fought back in the second-half with three goals by W.J. Spain. A full-time score of 5-1 to 1-6 gave Dublin the title and gave O'Shea an All-Ireland winners' medal.

O'Shea played with Dublin again in 1890 as his team set out to retain their title. 'The Dubs', however, made an early exit from the provincial championship.

== Personal life ==
Nicholas O'Shea was born in Tullohea, South Lodge just outside Carrick-on-Suir, County Tipperary in 1866. Born of farming stock, he received a brief education at the local national school before moving to Dublin. After working in the capital city for some time O'Shea accumulated enough money in 1893 to buy a pub in Clonskeagh. As of 2014 the pub is still in existence and is still in the ownership of the O'Shea family.

Nicholas O'Shea died at the young age of forty-six in 1912.

Sporting positions
| Preceded by Frank Coughlan | Dublin Senior Hurling Captain; 1889 | Succeeded by |
Achievements
| Preceded by Jim Stapleton (Tipperary) | All-Ireland SHC winning captain 1889 | Succeeded by Dan Lane (Cork) |
