= 1894 All-Ireland Senior Hurling Championship =

Championship details
- Teams: 5

All-Ireland champions
- Winning team: Cork (4th win)
- Captain: Stephen Hayes

All-Ireland Finalists
- Losing team: Dublin
- Captain: John McCabe

Provincial champions
- Munster: Cork
- Leinster: Dublin
- Ulster: Not Played
- Connacht: Not Played

Championship statistics
- No. matches played: 4
- Goals total: 15 (3.75 per game)
- Points total: 53 (13.25 per game)
- All-Star Team: See here

The All-Ireland Senior Hurling Championship 1894 was the eighth staging of the All-Ireland Senior Hurling Championship, the Gaelic Athletic Association's premier inter-county hurling tournament.

Cork were the defending champions.

The All-Ireland final was played at the Phoenix Park in Dublin on 24 March 1895 between Cork and Dublin, in what was their second meeting in the All-Ireland final overall. Cork won the match by 5–20 to 0–02 to become the first team to win three consecutive titles. It was their fourth All-Ireland title in five years.

== Participating teams ==
County	Club	Most recent success	
County	Club	All-Ireland	Provincial
Cork	Blackrock	1893	1893
Dublin	Rapparees	1889	1892
Kerry	Kilmoyley	1891	1891
Kilkenny	Confederation		1893
Limerick	n/a		

== Leinster Senior Hurling Championship ==
=== Leinster final ===
14 October 1894 Final	Dublin	w/o – scr.	Kilkenny	Clonturk Park

== Munster Senior Hurling Championship ==
=== Munster semi-finals ===
Semi-final	Tipperary	2–04 – 0–06	Kerry	Cork Park

Semi-final	Cork	4–13 – 0–02	Limerick	Cork Park

=== Munster final ===
3 March 1895 Final	Cork	3–04 – 1–02	Tipperary	Charleville Grounds

== All-Ireland Senior Hurling Championship ==
=== Final ===
24 March 1895 Final	Cork (Blackrock)	5–20 – 0–02	Dublin (Rapparees)	Phoenix Park
				Attendance: c.2,000 Referee: JJ Kenny (Dublin)

== Championship statistics ==
=== Miscellaneous ===
- Cork's 5–20 to 2–00 defeat of Dublin, a margin of 29 points, remains the second biggest defeat in an All-Ireland final.

== Sources ==
- Corry, Eoghan, The GAA Book of Lists (Hodder Headline Ireland, 2005).
- Donegan, Des, The Complete Handbook of Gaelic Games (DBA Publications Limited, 2005).
