= 1893 All-Ireland Senior Hurling Championship =

Championship details
- Dates: 5 November 1893 – 21 June 1894
- Teams: 5

All-Ireland champions
- Winning team: Cork (3rd win)
- Captain: John Murphy

All-Ireland Finalists
- Losing team: Kilkenny
- Captain: Dan Whelan

Provincial champions
- Munster: Cork
- Leinster: Kilkenny
- Ulster: Not Played
- Connacht: Not Played

Championship statistics
- No. matches played: 2
- Goals total: 11 (5.50 per game)
- Points total: 13 (6.50 per game)
- All-Star Team: See here

The 1893 All-Ireland Senior Hurling Championship was the seventh staging of the All-Ireland Senior Hurling Championship, the Gaelic Athletic Association's premier inter-county hurling tournament. The championship ran from 5 November 1893 to 21 June 1894.

Cork were the defending champions.

The All-Ireland final was played at the Phoenix Park in Dublin on 21 June 1894 between Cork and Kilkenny, in what was their first ever meeting in the All-Ireland final. Cork won the match by 6–08 to 0–02 to become the first team to retain the title. It was their third All-Ireland title in four years.

== Participating teams ==
County	Club	Most recent success	
County	Club	All-Ireland	Provincial
Cork	Blackrock	1892	1892
Dublin	Davitts	1889	1892
Kerry	Abbeydorney	1891	1891
Kilkenny	Confederation		1888
Limerick	Bruree		

== Leinster Senior Hurling Championship ==
=== Leinster final ===
Final	Kilkenny (Confederation)	w/o – scr.	Dublin (Davitts)

== Munster Senior Hurling Championship ==
=== Munster semi-final ===
Semi-final	Cork (Blackrock)	w/o – scr.	Kerry (Abbeydorney)

=== Munster final ===
5 November 1893 Final	Cork (Blackrock)	5–03 – 0–00	Limerick (Bruree)	Charleville Grounds

== All-Ireland Senior Hurling Championship ==
=== All-Ireland final ===
21 June 1894 Final	Cork (Blackrock)	6–08 – 0–02	Kilkenny (Confederation)	Phoenix Park
				Attendance: c.1,000 Referee: JJ Kenny (Dublin)

== Sources ==
- Corry, Eoghan, The GAA Book of Lists (Hodder Headline Ireland, 2005).
- Donegan, Des, The Complete Handbook of Gaelic Games (DBA Publications Limited, 2005).
