= Thomas Healy =

Thomas Healy may refer to:

- Thomas Healy (politician) (1894–1957), Liberal party member of the Canadian House of Commons
- Thomas F. Healy (1931–2004), U.S. Army general
- Tom Healy (hurler) (1855–?), Irish hurler
- Tom Healy (poet) (born 1961), American poet
- Thomas Joseph Healy, Member of Parliament for North Wexford, 1891–1900
- Thomas Healy (baseball) (1895–1977), Major League Baseball player for Philadelphia Athletics

== See also ==
- Tom Healey (1853–1891), American Major League Baseball player
- Thomas J. Healey (born 1942), academic at Harvard University’s John F. Kennedy School of Government
- Tom Healy (disambiguation)
