= Tom Healy =

Tom Healy may refer to:

- Tom Healy (poet) (born 1961), American poet
- Tom Healy (hurler) (1855–?), Irish sportsperson

== See also ==
- Thomas Healy (disambiguation)
- Tom Healey (1853–1891), American Major League Baseball player
