= Paddy O'Carroll =

Paddy O'Carroll may refer to:

- Paddy O'Carroll (swimmer), New Zealand swimmer
- Paddy O'Carroll (hurler), Irish hurler
