= Mick Neville =

Mick Neville may refer to:

- Mick Neville (footballer) (born 1960), former Irish footballer
- Mick Neville (hurler born 1891) (1891–1973), Irish hurler for Dublin and Limerick
- Mick Neville (Wexford hurler) (1887–?), Irish hurler for Wexford

== See also ==
- Michael Neville (disambiguation)
- Lady Anne Wallop, also known as Micky Nevill
