= 1898 Tipperary Senior Hurling Championship =

Annual hurling competition season

- Champions: Tubberadora (3rd title)
- Runners-up: Horse & Jockey

The 1898 Tipperary Senior Hurling Championship was the ninth staging of the Tipperary Senior Hurling Championship since its establishment by the Tipperary County Board in 1887.

Tubberadora won the championship after a 3–07 to 1–04 defeat of Horse & Jockey in the final. It was their third championship title overall and their first title since 1896.
