= 1895 All-Ireland Senior Hurling Championship final =

1895 All-Ireland Senior Hurling Final
- Event: 1895 All-Ireland Senior Hurling Championship
Tipperary	Kilkenny
6-8	1-10
- Date: 15 March 1896
- Venue: Jones' Road, Dublin
- Referee: J. J. Kenny (Dublin)
- Attendance: 8,000

The 1895 All-Ireland Senior Hurling Championship Final was the 8th All-Ireland Final and the culmination of the 1895 All-Ireland Senior Hurling Championship, an inter-county hurling tournament for the top teams in Ireland. The match was held at Jones' Road, Dublin, on 15 March 1896 between Kilkenny, represented by club side Tullaroan, and Tipperary, represented by club side Tubberadora. The Leinster champions lost to their Munster opponents on a score line of 6–8 to 1–10.

== Match details ==
1895-03-15

Tipperary	6-8 – 1-10	Kilkenny

Jones' Road, Dublin
Attendance: 8,000
Referee: J. J. Kenny (Dublin)
