= 1895 Tipperary Senior Hurling Championship =

Annual hurling competition season

- Champions: Tubberadora (1st title)
- Runners-up: Suir View

The 1895 Tipperary Senior Hurling Championship was the sixth staging of the Tipperary Senior Hurling Championship since its establishment by the Tipperary County Board in 1887.

Tubberadora won the championship after a 3–09 to 2–07 defeat of Suir View in the final. It was their first championship title.
