= 1902 All-Ireland Senior Hurling Championship =

All-Ireland champions
- Winning team: Cork (5th win)
- Captain: Jamesy Kelleher

All-Ireland Finalists
- Losing team: London
- Captain: Jim Nestor

Provincial champions
- Munster: Cork
- Leinster: Dublin
- Ulster: Derry
- Connacht: Galway

Championship statistics
- All-Star Team: See here

The 1902 All-Ireland Senior Hurling Championship was the 16th staging of the All-Ireland Senior Hurling Championship, the Gaelic Athletic Association's premier inter-county hurling tournament.

London were the defending champions.

The All-Ireland final was played on 11 September 1904 at the Athletic Grounds in Cork, between Cork and London, in what was their second consecutive meeting in the All-Ireland final. Cork won the match by 3–13 to 0–00 to claim their fifth All-Ireland title overall and a first title in eight years.

== Connacht Senior Hurling Championship ==
=== Connacht final ===
3 May 1903 Final	Galway	4–10 – 2-00	Roscommon	Claremorris Grounds

== Leinster Senior Hurling Championship ==
=== Leinster first round ===
1 November 1903 First round	Offaly	w/o – scr.	Carlow

24 January 1904 First round replay	Laois	1–08 – 1-01	Meath	Jones' Road Grounds

=== Leinster second round ===
24 January 1904 Second round	Offaly	0–07 – 0-03	Wexford	Jones' Road Grounds

31 January 1904 Second round	Kilkenny	2–10 – 0-01	Laois	Gaelic Park

=== Leinster semi-final ===
6 March 1904 Semi-final	Kilkenny	5–08 – 1-04	Offaly	Jones' Road Grounds

=== Leinster final ===
27 March 1904 Final	Dublin	0–08 – 1-04	Kilkenny	Jones' Road Grounds

== Munster Senior Hurling Championship ==
=== Munster first round ===
10 May 1903 First round	Kerry	5–05 – 0-03	Waterford	Turners Cross

28 June 1903 First round	Cork	6–07 – 3-03	Clare
			Tipperary Town Grounds

=== Munster semi-finals ===
7 June 1903 Semi-final	Limerick	w/o – scr.	Tipperary

9 August 1903 Semi-final	Cork	2–11 – 0-03	Kerry	Castle Grounds

=== Munster final ===
18 October 1903 Final	Cork	2–09 – 1-05	Limerick
			Tipperary Town Grounds

== Ulster Senior Hurling Championship ==
=== Ulster final ===
11 October 1903 Final	Derry	2–07 – 2-05	Antrim	Celtic Park

== All-Ireland Senior Hurling Championship ==
=== All-Ireland semi-finals ===
20 March 1904 Semi-final	Cork	10–13 – 0-00	Galway	Tipperary Town Grounds

5 June 1904 Semi-final	Dublin	6–19 – 0-06	Derry	Drogheda Grounds

=== All-Ireland home final ===
3 July 1904 Home final	Cork	1–07 – 1-07	Dublin	Tipperary Town Grounds

=== All-Ireland home final replay ===
17 July 1904 Home final replay	Cork	2–06 – 0-01	Dublin	Tipperary Town Grounds

=== All-Ireland final ===
11 September 1904 Final	Cork	3–13 – 0-00	London	Cork Athletic Grounds

== Championship statistics ==
=== Miscellaneous ===
- Derry win the Ulster championship for the first time.
- The newly opened Cork Athletic Grounds hosted the All-Ireland final for the first time.

== Sources ==
- Corry, Eoghan, The GAA Book of Lists (Hodder Headline Ireland, 2005).
- Donegan, Des, The Complete Handbook of Gaelic Games (DBA Publications Limited, 2005).
