= Michael Neville =

Michael Neville may refer to:

- Mike Neville (ice hockey), Canadian professional ice hockey player
- Mike Neville (newsreader) (1936–2017), British television presenter

== See also ==
- Mick Neville (disambiguation)
