= Paddy O'Carroll (hurler) =

Irish hurler

Personal information
- Native name: Pádraig Ó Cearúill (Irish)
- Nickname: Carr
- Born: 17 February 1866 Ballyduff, County Kerry, Ireland
- Died: 29 December 1960 (aged 94) Ballyduff, County Kerry, Ireland
- Occupation: Farmer

Sport
- Sport: Hurling
Clubs
- Years: Club
- Ballyduff; Kilmoyley
Club titles
- Kerry titles: 2
Inter-county
- Years: County
- Kerry
Inter-county titles
- Munster titles: 1
- All-Irelands: 1

Paddy O'Carroll (17 February 1866 – 29 December 1960) was an Irish hurler who played for club sides Ballyduff and Kilmoyley, and at inter-county level with the Kerry senior hurling team.

== Playing career ==
Born in Ballyduff, County Kerry, O'Carroll first played hurling with the local club. He won a County Championship title in 1891, a victory which allowed Ballyduff represent Kerry in the 1891 Munster Championship. He ended the provincial campaign with a winners' medal after a win over Limerick in the final. Kerry subsequently faced Wexford in the 1891 All-Ireland final, with O'Carroll once again selected on the team, and went on to claim a 2–03 to 1–05 win after extra time. O'Carroll won a second County Championship medal in 1895, this time lining out with Kilmoyley.

== Death ==
O'Carroll died in Ballyduff on 29 December 1960. At the time of his death he was the last surviving member of Kerry's All-Ireland-winning team.

== Honours ==
Ballyduff

- Kerry Senior Hurling Championship (1): 1891

Ballyduff

- Kerry Senior Hurling Championship (1): 1895

Kerry

- All-Ireland Senior Hurling Championship (1): 1891
- Munster Senior Hurling Championship (1): 1891
