= 1889 All-Ireland Senior Hurling Championship final =

1889 All-Ireland Senior Hurling Final
- Event: 1889 All-Ireland Senior Hurling Championship
| Dublin | Clare |
| 5-1 | 1-6 |
- Date: 1 November 1889
- Venue: St. Patrick's GAA Field, Dublin
- Referee: P. Tobin (Dublin)
- Attendance: 1,500

The 1889 All-Ireland Senior Hurling Championship Final was a hurling match that was played at St.Patrick's GAA Field, Dublin on 1 November 1889 to determine the winners of the 1889 All-Ireland Senior Hurling Championship, the second season of the All-Ireland Senior Hurling Championship, a tournament organised by the Gaelic Athletic Association for the champion teams of Leinster and Munster. The final was contested by Dublin of Leinster and Clare of Munster, with Dublin winning by 5–1 to 1–6.

The All-Ireland final between Clare and Dublin was a unique occasion as it was the first championship meeting between the two teams.

== Match ==
=== Details ===
1 November 1889

| Dublin | 5-1 – 1-6 | Clare |

St. Patrick's GAA Field, Dublin
Attendance: 1,500
Referee: P. Tobin (Dublin)
