= Tubberadora Hurling Club =

Gaelic games club in County Tipperary, Ireland

Tubberadora
- Tiobraid Fheorainn
- Founded: 1895
- County: Tipperary
- Colours

Playing kits
Standard colours

Senior Club Championships
	All Ireland	Munster champions	Tipperary champions
Hurling:	0	0	3

Tubberadora Hurling Club was a Gaelic Athletic Association club in Tubberadora, County Tipperary, Ireland. The club was affiliated to the Tipperary County Board and was solely concerned with the game of hurling.

== History ==
Located in the rural townland of Tubberadora, about 5 km from Holycross, Tubberadora Hurling Club was established by a group of local farmers and labourers. Throughout its brief existence, the club dominated at local and national levels. Between 1895 and 1898, Tubberadora won three Tipperary SHC titles. The club also represented Tipperary in the inter-county series of games and won three Munster SHC titles during this time as well. Tubberadora also won three All-Ireland SHC titles, following defeats of Kilenny (1895 and 1898) and Dublin (1896). Such was the club's dominance that the townland became known as the golden square mile, with up to 100 All-Ireland SHC medals coming to the area in a four-year period. Five households in the area brought home 28 of these medals. Tubberadora Hurling Club remained undefeated in championship hurling for its entire existence and disbanded in 1898.

== Honours ==
- All-Ireland Senior Hurling Championship (3): 1895, 1896, 1898
- Munster Senior Hurling Championship (3): 1895, 1896, 1898
- Tipperary Senior Hurling Championship (3): 1895, 1896, 1898

== Notable players ==
- Tim Condon: All-Ireland SHC-winner (1895, 1896, 1898)
- Mikey Maher: All-Ireland SHC-winner (1895, 1896, 1898, 1899, 1900)
- E. D. Ryan: All-Ireland SHC-winner (1896, 1898)
- Johnny Walsh: All-Ireland SHC-winner (1895, 1896, 1898, 1899, 1900)
