= Johnny Walsh (hurler) =

Irish hurler

Personal information
- Native name: Seán Breathnach (Irish)
- Born: 22 August 1874 Tubberadora, County Tipperary, Ireland
- Died: 1 September 1957 (aged 83) Tubberadora, County Tipperary, Ireland

Sport
- Sport: Hurling
- Position: Half-back
Club
- Years: Club
- Tubberadora
Inter-county
- Years: County
- 1895-1900: Tipperary
Inter-county titles
- Munster titles: 5
- All-Irelands: 5

Johnny Walsh (22 August 1874 – 1 September 1957) was a famous Irish sportsperson. He played hurling with his local club Tubberadora and with the Tipperary senior inter-county team from 1895 until 1900.

== Playing career ==
=== Club ===
Walsh played his club hurling with his local Tubberadorat club and enjoyed much success. He won senior county championship titles with the club in 1895, 1896 and 1898. Tubberadora never again won another senior county title.

=== Inter-county ===
Walsh first came to prominence on the inter-county scene with Tipperray in 1890. Cork, however, were the standard bearers in the province of Munster at the time. In 1895 Tipp faced Limerick in the provincial final and the game turned into a rout. Tipperary won the game by 7-8 to 0-2 giving Walsh his first Munster title. Tipperary later played Kilkenny in the All-Ireland final to be played at what is now Croke Park. Tipp took a 1-6 to 1-0 lead at half-time and went on to hammer ‘the Cats’ by 6-8 to 1-10 at the final whistle. Tipperary’s Paddy Riordan is said to have scored all but one point of his team’s total as Walsh collected his first All-Ireland title.

In 1896 as Tipperary played Cork in the Munster final. That game had to end before the official finish and a replay took place. Tipp easily won the replay by 7-9 to 2-3. The subsequent All-Ireland final saw Tipperary play Dublin at the famous Jones’s Road ground. Tipp scored a goal in the very first minute and took a 4-6 to 0-1 lead at half-time. The game turned into a rout as Tipperary won by 8-14 to 0-4 giving Walsh a second All-Ireland title. This game still holds the record as the most one-sided All-Ireland final.

Tipp surrendered their provincial crown in 1897, however, the team took on Cork in the 1898 Munster final. That game had to be abandoned due to fading light, however, Walsh collected a third provincial title as Tipp easily defeated ‘the Rebels’ in the replay. Galway fell heavily in the penultimate game of the championship, allowing Tipp to advance to the All-Ireland final against Kilkenny. In a high-scoring and exciting game Kilkenny were on top for the first twenty-five minutes. In the second-half Tipp took the upper hand with Mikey Maher scoring three goals. A 7-13 to 3-10 score line gave Tipp the victory and gave Walsh a third All-Ireland title as captain.

1899 saw Tipperary defeat Clare in the provincial decider giving Walsh his fourth Munster title. It was another rout as the 5-16 to 0-8 score line suggests. This victory allowed Walsh's team to advance directly to the All-Ireland final where Wexford provided the opposition. Wexford held Tipp for the first fifteen minutes; however, they still took a 2-6 to 1-3 lead at half-time. Walsh 's side went on the rampage in the second-half and finished with a score of 3-12 to 1-4. The Wexford team walked off the field with ten minutes left in the game because they couldn’t find a substitute for an injured player. Tipp were awarded the title and Walsh collected his fourth All-Ireland title.

In 1900 Tipperary trounced Kerry by 6-11 to 1-9 in the provincial final, giving Walsh his fifth Munster title. Tipp later narrowly defeated Kilkenny in the All-Ireland semi-final before trouncing Galway in the ‘home’ All-Ireland final. This was not the end of the championship campaign because, for the first year ever, the ‘home’ finalists had to take on London in the real All-Ireland final. The game was a close affair with both sides level at 0-5 with eight minutes to go. London then took the lead; however, they later conceded a free. Mikey Maher stepped up, took the free and a forward ‘charge’ carried the sliothar over the line. Tipp scored another goal following a weak puck out and claimed the victory. It was Walsh's fifth and final All-Ireland title. He retired from inter-county hurling shortly afterwards.
