= 1887 All-Ireland Senior Hurling Championship final =

1887 All-Ireland Senior Hurling Final
- Event: 1887 All-Ireland Senior Hurling Championship
Tipperary	Galway
1-1 (1)	0-0 (0)
- Date: 1 April 1888
- Venue: Birr Sportsfield, Birr
- Referee: Pauric White (Offaly)
- Attendance: c. 3,000

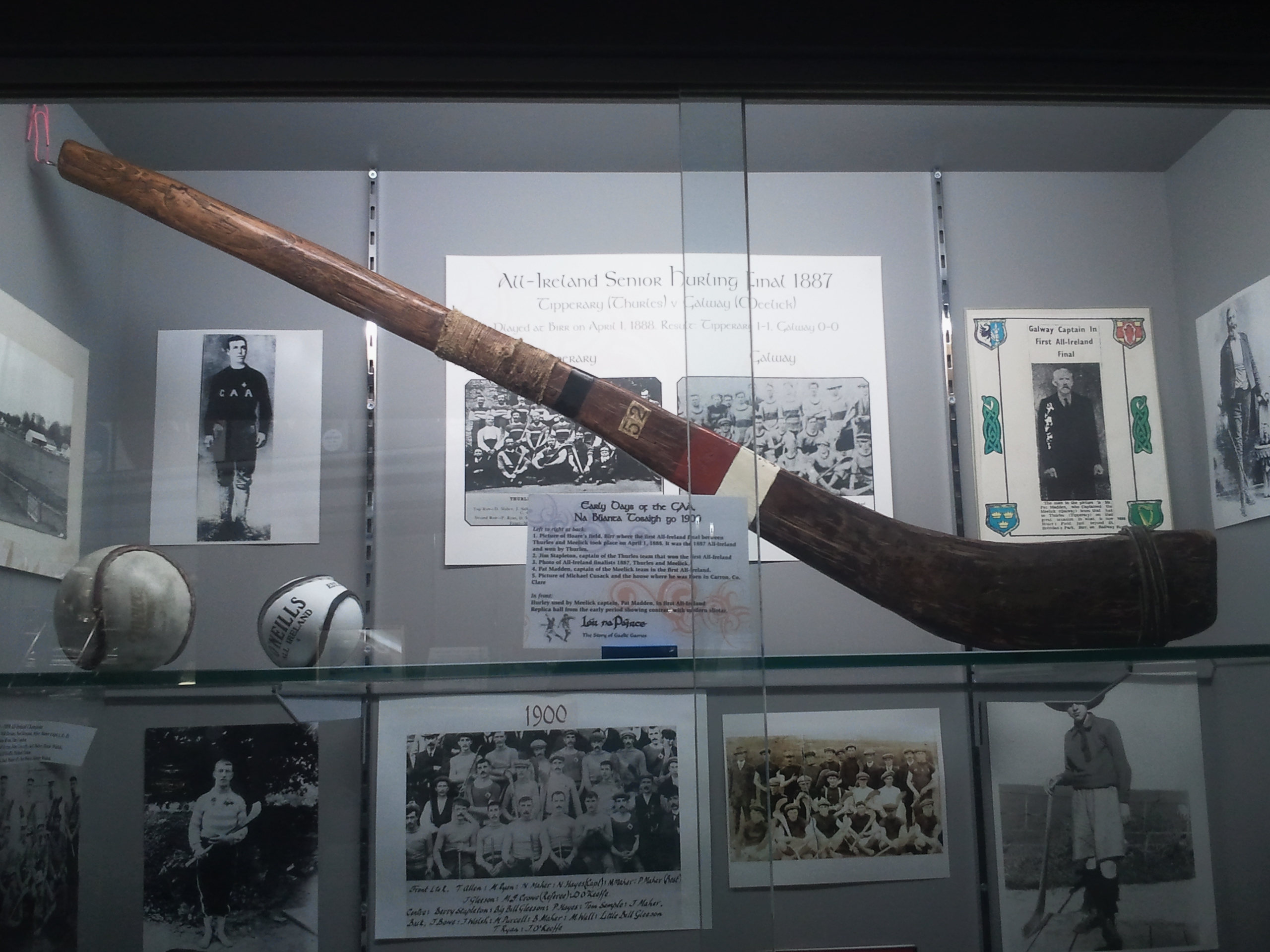
Hurley used by Pat Madden in the 1887 final (GAA Museum)

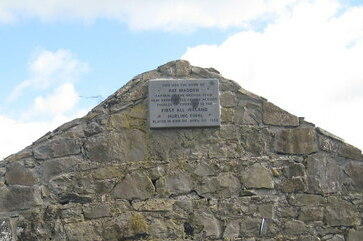
Plaque honouring Madden at his childhood home in Meelick

The 1887 All-Ireland Senior Hurling Championship Final was a hurling match that was played at Birr Sportsfield, Birr on 1 April 1888 to determine the winners of the 1887 All-Ireland Senior Hurling Championship, the first season of the All-Ireland Senior Hurling Championship, a tournament organised by the Gaelic Athletic Association for inter-county hurling teams in Ireland. The final was contested by club representatives Thurles Blues of Tipperary and Meelick of Galway, with Tipperary winning by 1–1 (and a forfeit point) to 0–00.

Thurles/Tipperary wore green and gold, while Meelick/Galway were in blue and white.

Patrick White, a native of Blakefield, Toomevara and the first secretary of Offaly County G.A.A. Board. was the referee.

Tipperary's clash with Galway proved to be their toughest championship test yet. At a crucial stage in the second-half team captain Jim Stapleton led a charge down the field. Spotting a free player he passed the sliotar to Tom Healy who went on to score the first goal in an All-Ireland final.

Tipperary's All-Ireland victory was their first in what would be a remarkable record of securing an All-Ireland title in every decade. Tipperary also held a record of never losing an All Ireland Final from 1887 to 1909.

== Match ==
=== Details ===
1 April 1888

Tipperary	1-1 (1) – 0-0 (0)	Galway

Birr Sportsfield, Birr
Attendance: c. 5,000
Referee: Patrick J White (Offaly)
