= Cork Athletic Grounds =

Gaelic Athletic Association (GAA) stadium

- Páirc Lúthchleasaíochta Chorcaí
- Location: Ballintemple, Cork City, Ireland
- Field size: 135 x 85 m

Construction
- Opened: 11 September 1904
- Closed: 1974

The Cork Athletic Grounds was a Gaelic Athletic Association (GAA) stadium where major hurling and football matches were played. Situated in the Ballintemple area of Cork in Ireland, it was the home of Cork GAA between 1904 and 1974. The stadium was demolished in 1974 and replaced by Páirc Uí Chaoimh.

== History ==
In late 1902, an attempt was made by the Cork County Board of the GAA to provide Cork city with a dedicated athletic stadium. A new company, the Cork Athletic Grounds Committee Ltd., was established under the chairmanship of James Crosbie. The county board invested £30 in the venture and a member of the board was appointed as a director. The subscriptions for the share capital reached sufficient funds, and in early 1903 a lease for six acres was drawn up between the Cork Agricultural Society, the Cork Corporation and the Cork County Board treasurer John FitzGerald. The official opening of the venue was in September 1904, for the (delayed) 1902 All-Ireland football and 1902 All-Ireland hurling finals.

The stadium was initially intended to cater for various sports, and it was even earmarked to hold a rugby union international between Ireland and Wales. By 1906, the Athletic Grounds were used exclusively for Gaelic games.

Preceded by Jones' Road; Athy	All-Ireland Senior Hurling Championship; Final Venue; 1902; 1909	Succeeded by Fraher Field; Jones' Road
