= Jim Stapleton =

Irish hurler

Personal information
- Native name: Séamus Mac an Ghaill (Irish)
- Born: 1863 Thurles, County Tipperary, Ireland
- Died: 18 March 1949 (aged 85) Thurles, County Tipperary, Ireland
- Occupation: Farmer
- Height: 5 ft 10 in (178 cm)

Sport
- Sport: Hurling
- Position: Forward
Club
- Years: Club
- Thurles Sarsfield's
Club titles
- Tipperary titles: 1
Inter-county
- Years: County
- 1887: Tipperary
Inter-county titles
- All-Irelands: 1

James Stapleton (1863 – 18 March 1949) was an Irish hurler who played as a forward for the Tipperary senior team.

Stapleton made his first appearance for the team during the inaugural championship and was a regular member of the team for just one season. During his brief inter-county career he won one All-Ireland medal. Stapleton captained the team to the All-Ireland title in 1887.

At club level Stapleton was a one-time county championship medalist with Thurles Sarsfield's.

== Biography ==
Jim Stapleton was born in Thurles, County Tipperary in 1863. He was born into an area that had a strong hurling tradition, and he grew up playing the game with his local team. On the field of play Stapleton was widely known for his strength and his stamina. Off the field he was regarded as a sincere gentleman.

Jim Stapleton died in 1949.

== Playing career ==
=== Club ===
Stapleton played his club hurling with the famous Thurles Sarsfields club. In 1887 he won his only county championship title.

=== Inter-county ===
As a result of this victory in the county championship, Thurles were given the honour of representing Tipperary in the inaugural All-Ireland Hurling Championship. They defeated Clare in the opening round before advancing to the final following a semi-final victory over Kilkenny. Fate played a large role in Stapleton having the mantle of captain bestowed on him for the inaugural All-Ireland final. Because of a dispute over the railway travelling expenses, seven players including the Thurles captain Dinny Maher were left standing on the platform of the morning of the match. Tipp's All-Ireland final meeting with Galway proved to be their toughest test yet. At a crucial stage in the second-half Stapleton led a charge down the field. Spotting a free player he passed the sliothar to Tom Healy who went on to score the very first goal in an All-Ireland final. Stapleton, on the other hand, had the honour of being the first person to captain a team to an All-Ireland Hurling Final victory.

In 1888 Stapleton was among 50 Irish athletes and hurlers who traveled to the United States to play in several hurling exhibition games. While many of the group stayed in America, Stapleton returned home where he continued his involvement with the infant Gaelic Athletic Association.

Sporting positions
Preceded by Dinny Maher	Tipperary Senior Hurling Captain; 1887	Succeeded by Thady Ryan
Achievements
Preceded by none	All-Ireland Senior Hurling Final winning captain 1887	Succeeded by Nicholas O'Shea (Dublin)
