= E. D. Ryan =

Irish hurler

Personal information
- Native name: Éamonn D. Ó Riain (Irish)
- Born: Edmond D. Ryan; 18 May 1874 Boherlahen, County Tipperary, Ireland
- Died: 18 February 1969 (aged 94) Cashel, County Tipperary, Ireland
- Occupation: Draper

Sport
- Sport: Hurling
- Position: Left wing-back
Clubs
- Years: Club
- Tubberadora; Cashel King Cormacs
Inter-county
- Years: County
- 1896-1898: Tipperary
Inter-county titles
- Munster titles: 2
- All-Irelands: 2

Edmond D. Ryan (18 May 1874 – 18 February 1969) was an Irish sportsperson. He played hurling with his local clubs Tubberadora and Cashel King Cormacs and was a member of the Tipperary senior hurling team between 1896 and 1898.

== Biography ==
Raised near Boherlahen, County Tipperary, Ryan was born to James Ryan, a farmer, and his wife Ellen. After a brief education he later moved Cashel where he first worked as a shopkeeper before opening his own business as a draper.

Ryan first came to prominence as a hurler with the Tubberadora club that dominated the Tipperary Championship in the 1890s. He also played with the Cashel King Cormacs club.

Success at club level saw Ryan join the Tipperary senior hurling team during the 1896 championship. He won All-Ireland Championship medals in 1896 and 1898 after respective defeats of Dublin and Kilkenny. Ryan also won two Munster Championship medals.

Ryan died in Cashel on 18 February 1969. At the time of his death he was Tipperary's oldest All-Ireland medal winner.

== Honours ==
Tipperary

- All-Ireland Senior Hurling Championship (2): 1896, 1898
- Munster Senior Hurling Championship (2): 1896, 1898
