= 1891 All-Ireland Senior Hurling Championship final =

1891 All-Ireland Senior Hurling Final
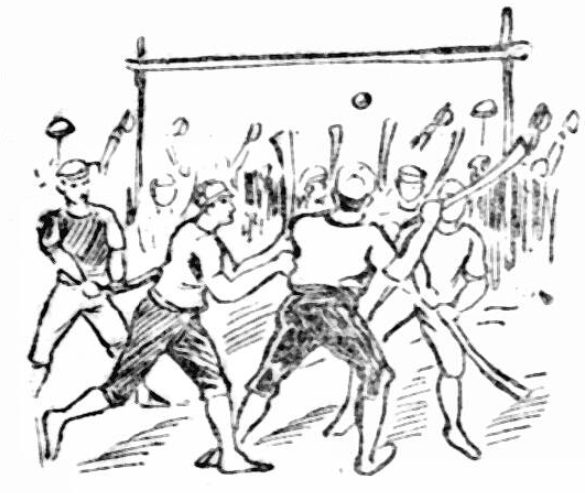
- The game as depicted in Weekly Freeman's Journal - March 1892
- Event: 1891 All-Ireland Senior Hurling Championship
Kerry	Wexford
2-3	1-5
- Date: 28 February 1892
- Venue: Clonturk Park, Dublin
- Referee: P. Tobin (Dublin)
- Attendance: 4,000

The 1891 All-Ireland Senior Hurling Championship Final was the 4th All-Ireland Final and the culmination of the 1891 All-Ireland Senior Hurling Championship, an inter-county hurling tournament for the top teams in Ireland. The match was held at Clonturk Park, Dublin, on 28 February 1892, between Kerry and Wexford. The Leinster champions lost out to their Munster counterparts on a score line of 2–3 to 1–5.

It took place at Clonturk Park on 28 February 1892, but had been due to take place a week earlier, on 21 February, however it was postponed owing to a snow storm.

Counties were represented by club teams in the early years of the GAA, and Kerry was represented by Ballyduff while Crossabeg represented Wexford. Ballyduff wore grey jersey with a gold hoop, and Crossabeg played in green and amber.

This was the last All-Ireland Final to be played where a goal outweighed any number of points.

The game is notable for a number of reasons. This remains Kerry's only triumph in the All-Ireland championship. It came a full twelve years before their first All-Ireland title in Gaelic football. As of July 2023. This was the only All-Ireland final to be decided after a period of extra-time until 2024.

== Match details ==
28 February 1892

Kerry	2-3 – 1-5 (AET)	Wexford

Clonturk Park, Dublin
Attendance: 4,000
Referee: P. Tobin (Dublin)

=== Teams ===
Kerry
J Mahony (c)
M Kelly (goal.)
M McCarthy
P Carroll
P Wynne
M J O’Sullivan
R Kissane
F Crowley
J Crowley
J O’Sullivan
T Dunne
J Murphy
M Fitzmaurice
J McDonnell
T D McCarthy
T E McCarthy
M Riordan
P Quane
J Quane
P Rourke
P Kirby
Sub: J Murphy (Dromartin) for T Murphy

Wexford
N Daly (c)
J Leary (goal.)
E Leacy
L Leacy
M Lacy
James Murphy
John Murphy
T Murphy
N Murphy
M Browne
G Browne
P Quirke
P Byrne
M Kirwan
M Redmond
P Harpur
N Moher
O Daly
P McDonnell
T Devereaux
M Harpur
