= 1896 Tipperary Senior Hurling Championship =

Annual hurling competition season

- Champions: Tubberadora (2nd title)
- Runners-up: Suir View

The 1896 Tipperary Senior Hurling Championship was the seventh staging of the Tipperary Senior Hurling Championship since its establishment by the Tipperary County Board in 1887.

Tubberadora won the championship after a 3–09 to 2–07 defeat of Suir View in the final. It was their second championship title overall and their second title in succession.
