= 1889 All-Ireland Senior Hurling Championship =

Championship details
- Dates: 27 July 1889 – 3 November 1889
- Teams: 10

All-Ireland champions
- Winning team: Dublin (1st win)
- Captain: Nicholas O'Shea

All-Ireland Finalists
- Losing team: Clare
- Captain: Thomas Coughlan

Provincial champions
- Munster: Clare
- Leinster: Dublin
- Ulster: Not Played
- Connacht: Not Played

Championship statistics
- No. matches played: 5
- Goals total: 25 (5.0 per game)
- Points total: 28 (5.6 per game)
- All-Star Team: See here

The 1889 All-Ireland Senior Hurling Championship was the third staging of the All-Ireland hurling championship since its establishment by the Gaelic Athletic Association in 1887. The championship began on 27 July 1889 and ended on 3 November 1889.

Tipperary were the defending champions; however, they were defeated in the provincial series. Dublin won the title following a 5–1 to 1–6 defeat of Clare in the final.

== Teams ==
A total of ten teams contested the championship, one less than the previous year. It was the first championship to be completed since 1887.

The Leinster championship was contested by just four teams; however, due to walkovers and disputes, only one game was played. 1888 championship participants Kildare did not field a team.

All six counties entered a team in the Munster championship.

Once again, the hurling championship was not contested in either Connacht or Ulster.

=== General information ===
Ten counties competed in the All-Ireland Senior Hurling Championship: four teams in the Leinster Senior Hurling Championship and six teams in the Munster Senior Hurling Championship.

County	Club	Province	Colours	Appearance	Position in 1888 Championship	Provincial Titles	Last provincial title	Championship Titles	Last championship title
Clare	Tulla	Munster	Purple and yellow	3rd	Runners-up (Munster Senior Hurling Championship)	0	–	0	–
Cork	Blackrock	Munster	Green and yellow	2nd	Finalists	1	1888	0	–
Dublin	Kickhams	Leinster	Red	3rd	Runners-up (Leinster Senior Hurling Championship)	0	–	0	–
Kerry	Kenmare	Munster	Red and black	1st	–	0	–	0	–
Kilkenny	Tullaroan	Leinster	Green and white	3rd	Finalists	1	1888	0	–
Laois	Rathdowney	Leinster	Green and red	2nd	Semi-finals (Leinster Senior Hurling Championship)	0	–	0	–
Limerick	South Liberties	Munster	Green and yellow	2nd	Semi-finals (Munster Senior Hurling Championship)	0	–	0	–
Louth	Drogheda Gaelics	Leinster	–	1st	–	0	–	0	–
Tipperary	Moycarkey	Munster	Red and yellow	3rd	Quarter-finals (Munster Senior Hurling Championship)	0	–	1	1887
Waterford		Munster	–	2nd	Semi-finals (Munster Senior Hurling Championship)	0	–	0	–

== Provincial championships ==
=== Leinster Senior Hurling Championship ===
Quarter-finals

25 August 1889 Quarter-final	Louth	0–01 – 6–09	Dublin	Drogheda
				Attendance: 8,000; Referee: P. R. Cleary

Semi-finals

15 September 1889 Semi-final	Dublin	w/o – scr.	Kilkenny	Dublin

Final

13 October 1889 Final	Dublin	w/o – scr.	Laois	Inchicore

=== Munster Senior Hurling Championship ===
Quarter-finals

Quarter-final	Tipperary	w/o – scr.	Waterford

13 October 1889 Quarter-final	Clare	5–01 – 2–02	Limerick	Newport
				Referee: J Cullinane

Semi-finals

27 July 1889 Semi-final	Cork	0–05 – 1–01	Kerry	Mallow

16 October 1889 Semi-final	Tipperary	3–00 – 2–02	Clare	Boher
				Referee: P. R. Cleary

Final

18 October 1889 Final	Clare	w/o – scr.	Kerry

== All-Ireland Senior Hurling Championship ==
Final

3 November 1889 Final	Dublin	5–01 – 1–06	Clare	Inchicore
				Attendance: 1,500; Referee: P. Tobin (Dublin)

== Championship statistics ==
- Kilkenny had originally intended field a team in the championship; however, they withdrew as they did not recognise the newly formed Central Council.
- In the Munster semi-final, Tipperary defeated Clare by 3–0 to 2–2. A subsequent objection by Clare saw the result overturned.
- W.J. Spain of Dublin becomes the first dual All-Ireland medallist. He had previously won an All-Ireland medal with the Limerick Gaelic footballers in 1887

== Sources ==
- Corry, Eoghan, The GAA Book of Lists (Hodder Headline Ireland, 2005).
- Donegan, Des, The Complete Handbook of Gaelic Games (DBA Publications Limited, 2005).
