= Danny Ryan =

Irish hurler (1870–1966)

Personal information
- Native name: Dónall Ó Riain (Irish)
- Born: 1 May 1870 Littleton, County Tipperary, Ireland
- Died: 31 December 1966 (aged 96) Littleton, County Tipperary, Ireland
- Occupation: Farmer

Sport
- Sport: Hurling
- Position: Forward
Club
- Years: Club
- Moycarkey–Borris
Inter-county
- Years: County
- 1887: Tipperary
Inter-county titles
- All-Irelands: 1

Daniel Ryan (1 May 1870 – 31 December 1966) was an Irish hurler who played as a forward for the Tipperary senior team.

Ryan lined out for the team for just one season during the inaugural 1887 championship. He enjoyed much success that year, winning an All-Ireland medal as Tipp claimed the very first championship title.

At club level Ryan played with Moycarkey–Borris.
