= Mick Neville (Wexford hurler) =

Irish hurler

Personal information
- Native name: Mícheál Ó Nia (Irish)
- Born: 26 February 1887 Castlebridge, County Wexford, Ireland
- Died: 26 December 1981 (aged 94) Castlebridge, County Wexford, Ireland
- Occupation: Postman

Sport
- Sport: Hurling
Club
- Years: Club
- Castlebridge
Club titles
- Wexford titles: 6
Inter-county
- Years: County
- 1904-1918: Wexford
Inter-county titles
- Leinster titles: 2
- All-Irelands: 1

Michael Neville (26 February 1887 – 26 December 1981) was an Irish hurler who played for the Wexford senior team.

Neville made his first appearance for the team during the 1906 championship and was a regular member of the starting fifteen until his retirement after the 1920 championship. During that time he won one All-Ireland medal and two Leinster medals.

At club level Neville was a one-time county club championship medalist with Castlebridge.
