= W. J. Spain =

Irish Gaelic footballer and hurler

William J. Spain (3 September 1865 – 9 April 1936) was an Irish hurler and Gaelic footballer. He was the first player to win All-Ireland hurling and football medals. He played Gaelic football with Commercials and with the Limerick senior county team in the 1880s. Spain also played hurling with the CJ Kickhams club and with the Dublin senior county team in the 1880s. Spain was the first player to score a goal in an All-Ireland football final and the first player to score a hat-trick of goals in an All-Ireland hurling final.

== Playing career ==
=== Club ===
Spain was born in Moanfin in the parish of Cloughjordan, County Tipperary, and may have initially played hurling and football with the local Rapla team. The GAA club in Cloughjordan parish is now Kilruane MacDonaghs. He was the youngest son in a family of four boys and six girls. Spain began working in the drapery trade in Limerick and first came to prominence as a Gaelic footballer with the Commercials club in Limerick. The club had much success in the infant years of the Gaelic Athletic Association. Spain won a senior county title with the club in 1887.

Spain later moved to Dublin and joined CJ Kickhams (now known as Ballymun Kickhams). Here he had further success; however, this time it was on the hurling field. He won a senior county title with that club in 1889.

=== Inter-county ===
In 1887, the very first All-Ireland Championship took place in football. Limerick beat Meath, Kilkenny and Tipperary to qualify for the All-Ireland SFC final against Louth. The game itself was a close, low-scoring affair. Spain turned out to be the hero of the game. Eleven minutes into the second-half he scored a goal after a long dribbling run from his own 21-yard line. Limerick won the game by 1–4 to 0–3 and Spain collected his first All-Ireland title. Spain was the first player to score a goal in an All-Ireland football final.

Two years later, in 1889, Spain was a key member of the Dublin hurling team. In the first round they beat Louth and they got a walkover from Laois in the Leinster SHC final. This victory allowed Spain's side advance directly to the All-Ireland SHC final. Clare provided the opposition, and an eventful game followed. The Clare team, who played the game in their bare feet, took a half-time lead of 1–5 to 1–0. ‘The Dubs’ fought back in the second-half with Spain scoring a hat-trick of goals as Clare collapsed. Dublin won the game by 5–1 to 1–6, giving Spain an All-Ireland hurling title to match his football one. In doing so he became the first All-Ireland-winning dual player in the history of Gaelic games. Spain was the first player to score three goals in an All-Ireland hurling final.

Spain emigrated to New York, United States, in April 1890. Spain played in an exhibition Gaelic football game in Madison Square Gardens in December 1890 for New York Gaelic who beat Port Chester Sarsfields. Spain was the star of the game scoring 2 goals and 5 points.

Spain settled in New York and became a very successful silk merchant. He married Margaret Shanahan and they had two children; William and Mary. His son William died aged twenty while a student at Fordham University. William erected a seismograph station at the university as a memorial to his late son. The station was called 'The William Spain Seismic Observatory'. His daughter Mary married Herbert Weston and they had a daughter Melissa who married Thomas Bancroft Jr. William J Spain died at his holiday home in Florida on 9 April 1936.
