= 1888 All-Ireland Senior Hurling Championship =

Championship details
- Dates: 27 May – 2 September 1888
- Teams: 9

All-Ireland champions

Provincial champions
- Munster: Cork
- Leinster: Kilkenny
- Ulster: Not Played
- Connacht: Not Played

Championship statistics
- No. matches played: 5
- Goals total: 8 (1.60 per game)
- Points total: 31 (6.20 per game)
- All-Star Team: See here

The 1888 All-Ireland Senior Hurling Championship was the second staging of the All-Ireland Senior Hurling Championship since its establishment by the Gaelic Athletic Association in 1887. The championship began on 27 May 1888; however, no All-Ireland final took place and the championship remains unfinished due to the North American invasion tour of Irish athletes, an unsuccessful attempt to raise funds for a revival of the Tailteann Games.

Tipperary were the defending champions; however, they were defeated in the provincial series.

== Teams ==
A total of nine teams contested the championship, including four teams from the 1887 championship and five new entrants. Galway and Wexford did not field teams in the championship. Cork, Kildare, Laois, Limerick and Waterford all fielded teams in their respective provincial championships.

=== General information ===
Nine counties competed in the All-Ireland Senior Hurling Championship: four teams in the Leinster Senior Hurling Championship and five teams in the Munster Senior Hurling Championship.

County	Club	Province	Colours	Appearance	Position in 1887 Championship	Championship Titles	Last championship title
Clare	Ogonnelloe	Munster	Black and amber	2nd	Second round	0	–
Cork	Tower Street	Munster	Green	1st	–	0	–
Dublin	Kickhams	Leinster	Red	2nd	First round	0	–
Kildare	Monasterevin	Leinster	Blue and white	1st	–	0	–
Kilkenny	Mooncoin	Leinster	Green and white	2nd	Semi-finals	0	–
Laois	Rathdowney	Leinster	Green and red	1st	–	0	–
Limerick	South Liberties	Munster	Green and yellow	1st	–	0	–
Tipperary	Clonoulty	Munster	Green and yellow	2nd	Champions	1	1887
Waterford	Carrickbeg	Munster	–	1st	–	0	–

== Format ==
For the first time the championship was organised on a provincial basis. Two separate championships were played in Leinster and Munster with the winners meeting in the All-Ireland final.

Leinster Championship

Semi-finals: (2 matches) The four participating teams make up the semi-final pairings. Two teams are eliminated at this stage while the two winning teams advance to the Leinster final.

Final: (1 match) The winners of the two semi-finals contest this game. One team is eliminated at this stage while the winners are declared Leinster champions and qualify for the All-Ireland final.

Munster Championship

Quarter-final: (1 match) This is a lone match between the first two team drawn from the province. One team is eliminated at this stage while the winners advance to the semi-finals.

Semi-finals: (2 matches) The winners of the lone quarter-final join the three other teams to make up the semi-final pairings. Two teams are eliminated at this stage while the two winning teams advance to the Munster final.

Final: (1 match) The winners of the two semi-finals contest this game. One team is eliminated at this stage while the winners are declared Munster champions and qualify for the All-Ireland final.

All-Ireland Championship

Final: (1 match) The two provincial representatives from Leinster and Munster contest this game with the winners being declared All-Ireland champions.

== Provincial championships ==
=== Leinster Senior Hurling Championship ===
Semi-finals

3 June 1888 Semi-final	Dublin	3–6 – 0–2	Kildare	Donnybrook
				Referee: J. J. Kenny

10 June 1888 Semi-final	Laois	0–2 – 1–2	Kilkenny	Portlaoise
				Attendance: 10,000; Referee: G. F. Moore

Final

15 July 1888 Final	Kilkenny	0–7 – 0–3	Dublin	Portlaoise
				Referee: J. Maher

=== Munster Senior Hurling Championship ===
Quarter-finals

27 May 1888 Quarter-final	Cork	2–2 – 0–0	Tipperary	Buttevant
				Attendance: 12,000; Referee: J. Ryan

16 July 1888 Quarter-final refixture	Cork	w/o. – scr.	Tipperary	Buttevant

Semi-finals

22 July 1888 Semi-final	Waterford	0–0 – 2–8	Cork	Fraher Field
				Referee: D Fraher

Semi-final	Clare	w/o. – scr.	Limerick

Final

29 August 1888 Final	Cork	Postponed	Clare	Croom

2 September 1888 Final refixture	Cork	w/o. – scr.	Clare

== All-Ireland Senior Hurling Championship ==
=== Final ===
Final	Cork	Not played	Kilkenny

== Championship statistics ==
=== Miscellaneous ===
- In the Leinster semi-final between Dublin and Kildare, J. J. Kenny deputised as referee when James O'Connor did not turn up.
- Despite losing to Tipperary in the opening round, Cork advanced to the Munster semi-final as Tipperary champions Clonoulty used players from other clubs to supplement their team. Such a format was not yet allowed. A replay was ordered in Cork but Clonoulty refused to play anywhere in Cork stating a preference for Kilmallock. As a result of their refusal to play they were disqualified.
- In the Munster final Cork were due to play Clare champions Ogonelloe, who had received a walkover from South Liberties of Limerick in the semi-final. Before the final commenced South Liberties took to the field to play Ogonelloe. The officials decided then not to play either game. It was then decided to play the final in Cork the following week but Clare refused to travel and Cork were awarded the title.

== Sources ==
- Corry, Eoghan, The GAA Book of Lists (Hodder Headline Ireland, 2005).
- Donegan, Des, The Complete Handbook of Gaelic Games (DBA Publications Limited, 2005).
