= Tom Healy (hurler) =

Irish hurler

Tom or Tommy Healy (1855 in Littleton, County Tipperary – ?) was an Irish sportsperson. He played hurling with his local club Thurles Sarsfields and was a member of the very first Tipperary inter-county team in 1887.

Tommy Healy was born in Coolcroo, Littleton, County Tipperary in 1855. He was noted as a fine sportsperson and represented his native Thurles hurling club in the 1880s. In 1887 he won a Tipperary Senior Hurling Championship title with the club, and was consequently picked, with the rest of the team, to represent Tipperary in the inaugural All-Ireland Senior Hurling Championship. Healy's most notable moment came when he scored the very first goal in an All-Ireland Hurling Final. This happened in the 1887 final, when Tipperary played against Galway. Healy took a pass from team captain Jim Stapleton and made no mistake in sending a low, hard drive to the back of the opposition's net.
