= 1887 All-Ireland Senior Hurling Championship =

Championship details
- Dates: 2 July 1887 – 1 April 1888
- Teams: 6

All-Ireland champions
- Winning team: Tipperary (1st win)
- Captain: Jim Stapleton

All-Ireland Finalists
- Losing team: Galway
- Captain: Pat Madden

Provincial champions
- Munster: Not Played
- Leinster: Not Played
- Ulster: Not Played
- Connacht: Not Played

Championship statistics
- No. matches played: 4
- Goals total: 8 (2.00 per game)
- Points total: 22 (5.50 per game)
- All-Star Team: See here

The 1887 All-Ireland Senior Hurling Championship was the first staging of the All-Ireland Senior Hurling Championship. The championship began on 2 July 1887 and ended on 1 April 1888.

Tipperary won the title following a 1–1 to 0–0 defeat of Galway in the final.

== Background ==
The Gaelic Athletic Association (GAA), the governing body of Gaelic games in Ireland, had been formed in 1884, but for the first three years of its existence, its member clubs played only friendly matches and locally organised tournaments. In 1887, however, the existing county boards started to organise knock-out championships for the club teams within their own county. The county club championships were then extended to a national or All-Ireland inter-county series of games.

== Team changes ==
=== To championship ===
Entered championship

- Clare
- Dublin
- Galway
- Kilkenny
- Tipperary
- Wexford

== Teams ==
- All of the existing county boards were eligible to enter a team, however, only six chose to do so. Disputes in Cork and Limerick over which club should represent the county resulted in neither county fielding a team.
- In all five teams participated: Clare (Garraunboy Smith O'Briens), Dublin (Metropolitans) Galway (Meelick), Kilkenny (Tullaroan) Tipperary (Thurles) and Wexford (Castlebridge).
- All of the original entrants subsequently went on the claim the All-Ireland title, while all of the participating clubs still exist in some form.

=== Team Information ===
County	Representative club	Appearance
Clare	Garraunboy Smith O'Briens	1st
Dublin	Metropolitans	1st
Galway	Meelick	1st
Kilkenny	Tullaroan	1st
Tipperary	Thurles	1st
Wexford	Castlebridge	1st

== Format ==
For the only time in its history there were no provincial championships and an open draw was used to determine the pairings in the All-Ireland championship.

All-Ireland Championship

First round: (1 match) This is a lone match between the first two teams paired together. One team is eliminated at this stage while the winning team advances to the second round.

Second round: (1 match) This is a lone match between the winner of the first round and another team. One team is eliminated at this stage while the winning team advances to the semi-finals.

Semi-final: (2 matches) The winners of the second round game join the three remaining teams to make up the semi-final pairings. Two teams are eliminated at this stage while the two winning teams advance to the final.

Final: (1 match) The winners of the two semi-finals contest this game. The winners are declared All-Ireland champions.

== Scoring ==
A unique scoring system was used in the first championship. One goal was worth more than any number of points, while "forfeit points" (5 forfeit points = 1 point) were awarded in place of 65's. Scores here are given in the form goals-points-forfeit points, e.g. 2–4–1. So (for example), 2–0–0 defeats 1–7–2 (goal outvalues any number of points); 1–3–4 defeats 1–2–7 (3.8 points vs. 3.4 points); 3–0–6 defeats 3–1–0 (six forfeit points outvalue one point). Similarly, the playing pitch was significantly larger than the modern day pitch, particularly in width, and teams had twenty-one players. The scoring area was exactly similar to the scoring area used in the International rules football games.

== All-Ireland Senior Hurling Championship ==
=== Bracket ===
First round 30 July
Tipperary	w/o.
Dublin	scr.

Second round 24 September
Tipperary	1–07
Clare	0–02

Semi-finals; 2 July / 27 October
Tipperary	4–07
Kilkenny	0–00
Galway	2–08
Wexford	1–00

Final; 1 April 1888
Tipperary	1–01
Galway	0–00

=== All-Ireland first round ===
30 July 1887 First round	Tipperary	w/o – scr.	Dublin	Mountrath

=== All-Ireland second round ===
24 September 1887 Second round	Tipperary	1–07 – 0–02	Clare	Nenagh

=== All-Ireland semi-finals ===
2 July 1887 Semi-final	Galway	2–08 – 1–00	Wexford	Elm Park

27 October 1887 Semi-final	Tipperary	4–07 – 0–00	Kilkenny	Urlingford

=== All-Ireland Final ===
1 April 1888 Final	Tipperary	1–01 – 0–00	Galway	Birr
				Attendance: 5,000

== Championship statistics ==
=== Scoring events ===
- Most goals in a match: 4
  - Tipperary 4-07 – 0-00 Kilkenny (Semi-final)
- Most points in a match: 9
  - Tipperary 1-07 – 0-02 Clare (Second round)
- Most goals by one team in a match: 4
  - Tipperary 4-07 – 0-00 Kilkenny (Semi-final)
- Most points by one team in a match: 8
  - Galway 2-08 – 1-00 Wexford (Semi-final)

== Miscellaneous ==
- Tipperary receive a walkover in their opening game against Dublin. The Dublin champions, Metropolitans, sought a postponement of the game from the GAA's Executive because some of their players were on holidays. The request was refused.

== See also ==
- 1887 All-Ireland Senior Football Championship (Gaelic football equivalent)

== Sources ==
- Corry, Eoghan, The GAA Book of Lists (Hodder Headline Ireland, 2005).
- Donegan, Des, The Complete Handbook of Gaelic Games (DBA Publications Limited, 2005).

=== External links ===
- 1887 All-Ireland Senior Hurling Championship results
