= 1891 All-Ireland Senior Hurling Championship =

Championship details
- Dates: 20 September 1891 - 28 February 1892
- Teams: 7

All-Ireland champions
- Winning team: Kerry (1st win)
- Captain: John Mahony

All-Ireland Finalists
- Losing team: Wexford
- Captain: Nicholas Daly

Provincial champions
- Munster: Kerry
- Leinster: Wexford
- Ulster: Not Played
- Connacht: Not Played

Championship statistics
- No. matches played: 5
- Goals total: 11 (1.5 per game)
- Points total: 30 (4.2 per game)
- All-Star Team: See here

The 1891 All-Ireland Senior Hurling Championship was the fifth staging of the All-Ireland hurling championship since its establishment by the Gaelic Athletic Association in 1887. The championship began on 20 September 1891 and ended on 28 February 1892.

Cork were the defending champions, however, they were defeated in the provincial series. Kerry won the All-Ireland following a 2–3 to 1–5 defeat of Wexford in the final.

== Teams ==
A total of seven teams contested the championship.

The Leinster championship was contested by four teams: Dublin (Raparees), Kildare (Maynooth), Laois and Wexford (Crossabeg).

Three counties contested the Munster championship: Cork (Blackrock), Kerry (Ballyduff) and Limerick (Treaty Stones).

There were no provincial championships in either Connacht or Ulster.

=== General information ===
Seven counties competed in the All-Ireland Senior Hurling Championship: four teams in the Leinster Senior Hurling Championship and three teams in the Munster Senior Hurling Championship.

| County | Club | Province | Colours | Appearance | Position in 1890 Championship | Provincial Titles | Last provincial title | Championship Titles | Last championship title |
|---|---|---|---|---|---|---|---|---|---|
| Cork | Blackrock | Munster | | 4th | Champions | 2 | 1890 | 1 | 1890 |
| Dublin | Raparees | Leinster | | 5th | Semi-finals (Leinster Senior Hurling Championship) | 1 | 1889 | 1 | 1889 |
| Kerry | Ballyduff | Munster | | 3rd | Runners-Up (Munster Senior Hurling Championship) | 0 | – | 0 | – |
| Kildare | Maynooth | Leinster | | 3rd | Semi-finals (Leinster Senior Hurling Championship) | 0 | – | 0 | – |
| Laois | | Leinster | | 4th | Runners-Up (Leinster Senior Hurling Championship) | 0 | – | 0 | – |
| Limerick | Treaty Stones | Munster | | 4th | Quarter-finals (Munster Senior Hurling Championship) | 0 | – | 0 | – |
| Wexford | Crossabeg | Leinster | – | 3rd | Runners-up | 1 | 1890 | 0 | – |

== Provincial championships ==
=== Leinster Senior Hurling Championship ===
Semi-finals

| 25 October 1891 Semi-final | Wexford | w/o – scr. | Kildare | Clonturk Park |

| 25 October 1891 Semi-final | Dublin | w/o – scr. | Laois | Clonturk Park |

| 25 October 1891 Semi-final (refixture) | Dublin | 0–1 – 2–3 | Wexford | Clonturk Park |

Final

| 8 November 1891 Final | Wexford | w/o – scr. | Laois | Clonturk Park |

=== Munster Senior Hurling Championship ===
Semi-finals

| 20 September 1891 Semi-final | Kerry | 2–7 – 0–3 | Cork | Killarney |
| | | | | Attendance: 8,000 |

Final

| 1 November 1891 Final | Limerick | 1–2 – 1–1 | Kerry | Newcastle West |
| | | | | Referee: J Sheehy |

| 6 December 1891 Final (refixture) | Limerick | Postponed | Kerry | Mallow |

| 24 January 1892 Final (refixture) | Limerick | Postponed | Kerry | Abbeyfeale |

| 31 January 1892 Final (refixture) | Limerick | 0–1 – 2–4 | Kerry | Abbeyfeale |
| | | | | Referee: J Sheehy |

== All-Ireland Senior Hurling Championship ==
=== Final ===
| 28 February 1892 Final | Kerry | 2–3 – 1–5 (a.e.t.) | Wexford | Clonturk Park |
| | | | | Attendance: c.2,000 Referee: P Tobin (Dublin) |

== Championship statistics ==
=== Miscellaneous ===
- The semi-final fixtures on the opening day of the Leinster championship are thrown into disarray as Kildare and Laois fail to turn up to the venue. Wexford and Dublin, facing no opposition, decided to play a lone semi-final amongst themselves.
- Limerick win the Munster championship for the first time, however, Kerry launched an objection as the winning point was scored after the game had ended and a replay was ordered by Central Council. In the replay the result was reversed and Kerry claim their first Munster title.
- The day of the All-Ireland final at Clonturk Park featured a heavy programme of Gaelic games. The first game of the day was the All-Ireland football semi-final between Dublin and Cavan. The All-Ireland hurling final was the second game of the day while the All-Ireland football final between Cork and the winners of the first game immediately followed.
- The All-Ireland final between Kerry and Wexford was the first championship meeting between the two teams. The next championship meeting takes place 131 years later in 2022.
- A period of extra-time was played for the first time ever to decide an All-Ireland final.

== Roll of Honour ==
- Tipperary – 1 (1887)
- Dublin – 1 (1889)
- Cork – 1 (1890)
- Kerry – 1 (1891)

== Sources ==
- Corry, Eoghan, The GAA Book of Lists (Hodder Headline Ireland, 2005).
- Donegan, Des, The Complete Handbook of Gaelic Games (DBA Publications Limited, 2005).
