= Frank Kelleher =

Irish hurler

Personal information
- Native name: Prionsias Ó Céilleachair (Irish)
- Born: Patrick Francis Kelleher; 12 December 1891 Shanbally, County Cork, Ireland
- Died: 19 June 1958 (aged 66) Ballintemple, Cork, Ireland
- Occupation: Engine fitter

Sport
- Sport: Hurling
- Position: Left corner-back
Club
- Years: Club
- Shamrocks
Club titles
- Cork titles: 0
Inter-county
Years	County	Apps (scores)
1919-1922	Cork	5 (0-00)
Inter-county titles
- Munster titles: 2
- All-Irelands: 1

Patrick Francis Kelleher (12 December 1891 – 19 June 1958) was an Irish hurler. At club level he played with Shamrocks and was also a member of the Cork senior hurling team.

== Career ==
Kelleher first played hurling at club level with the Shamrocks club. He first appeared on the inter-county scene as a member of the Cork junior hurling team at various stages between 1911 and 1915. Kelleher joined the Cork senior hurling team during the team's successful 1919 Munster SHC campaign. He lined out in all except one of Cork's championship games that year, including the 1919 All-Ireland final defeat of Dublin. Kelleher won a second successive Munster SHC title the following year but ended up on the losing side in the 1920 All-Ireland final after a defeat by Dublin.

== Death ==
Kelleher died from a heart attack at the South Infirmary on 19 June 1958, aged 66.

== Honours ==
Cork

- All-Ireland Senior Hurling Championship: 1919
- Munster Senior Hurling Championship: 1919, 1920
