= Garrett Howard =

Irish hurler (1899–1995)

Personal information
- Native name: Gearóid Ó hÍomhair (Irish)
- Born: 10 December 1899 Patrickswell, County Limerick, Ireland
- Died: 20 January 1995 (aged 95) Borrisokane, County Tipperary, Ireland
- Occupation: Garda
- Height: 5 ft 11 in (180 cm)

Sport
- Sport: Hurling
- Position: Left wing-back
Clubs
- Years: Club
- Croom; Garda; Toomevara
Inter-county
- Years: County
- 1921–1923 1924–1929 1929–1932 1933–1936: Limerick; Dublin; Tipperary; Limerick
Inter-county titles
- Munster titles: 5
- Leinster titles: 3
- All-Irelands: 5
- NHL: 4
- All Stars: 1

Garrett Howard (10 December 1899 – 20 January 1995) was an Irish hurler who played as a left wing-back for the Limerick, Dublin and Tipperary senior teams.

Born in Patrickswell, County Limerick, Howard first arrived on the inter-county scene at the age of twenty-one when he first linked up with the Limerick senior team, before later lining out with the Dublin and Tipperary sides before returning to the Limerick colours. He made his senior debut in the 1921 championship. Howard went on to enjoy a fifteen-year inter-county career, and won five All-Ireland medals, five Munster medals, three Leinster medals and four National Hurling League medals. He was an All-Ireland runner-up on two occasions.

Howard represented the Munster and Leinster inter-provincial teams at various times, winning two Railway Cup medals during that period. At club level he won eight championship medals, playing with a host of clubs including Croom, Garda and Toomevara.

With Ireland Howard won two Tailteann Games medals, while he also represented his country in shinty.

His retirement came following the conclusion of the 1936 championship.

In retirement from playing, Howard became involved in team management and coaching. At inter-county level he guided Clare to an Oireachtas Cup as well as a first Munster final appearance in seventeen years. At club level he trained Carrick Swan GAA, Feakle and Burgess-Kildangan. Howard also served as a club referee.

Howard was the third recipient of the All-Time All-Star Award in 1982, and holds the record of being the only Limerick man to have won five All-Ireland medals.

== Playing career ==
=== Club ===
Howard enjoyed his first success in club hurling with Croom in 1919. A narrow 1–1 to 1–0 defeat of Fedamore gave him a Limerick Senior Hurling Championship medal.

A move to Dublin saw Howard join the Garda club which enjoyed an unprecedented run of success in the late twenties. Five successive championship titles were annexed between 1925 and 1929, with Howard lining out in each of these victories.

Howard finished his club hurling career with Toomevara. In 1930 he won a championship medal following a 4–1 to 1–0 defeat of Boherlahan in a replay of the decider

Toomevara retained their championship title in 1931, with Howard collecting a second consecutive championship medal following a 5–4 to 2–0 defeat of Moycarkey-Borris.

=== Inter-county ===
==== Beginnings ====
Howard joined the Limerick senior team in 1921, at a time when the championship was severely hampered by the War of Independence. As a result of this disruption only Cork and Limerick contested the southern provincial championship. A 5–2 to 1–2 defeat of the reigning champions gave Howard his first Munster medal. The subsequent All-Ireland final was delayed until 4 March 1923, with Howard included on the Limerick team to face Dublin. Limerick captain Bob McConkey scored a hat-trick of goals in the opening half, before adding a fourth after the interval. Limerick eventually powered to an 8–5 to 3–2 victory. It was Howard's first All-Ireland medal.

==== Success with Dublin ====
In 1924 Howard transferred to the Dublin senior team. Success was immediate as he captured a Leinster medal following a 4–4 to 3–1 defeat of first-time finalists Offaly. The subsequent All-Ireland final was played on 14 December 1924, with reigning champions Galway providing the opposition. The westerners had the measure of Dublin for much of the game, however, Dublin got back on level terms when Howard drove the Galway goalkeeper into and under the net before scoring a second goal. Dublin eventually won the game on a score line of 5–3 to 2–6 and Howard collected his second All-Ireland medal.

Three years later in 1927 Howard won a second Leinster medal following a 7–7 to 4–6 defeat of Kilkenny. On 4 September 1927 Dublin faced reigning champions Cork in the All-Ireland decider. Howard was one of nine members of the Garda Síochána on the Dublin team who took a 2–3 to 0–1 lead at half-time. Cork fought back in the third quarter, however, Howard collected his third All-Ireland medal following a 4–8 to 1–3 victory.

Howard added a third Leinster medal to his collection in 1928 following a 9–7 to 4–3 defeat of Offaly.

In 1930 Howard's Dublin renewed their rivalry with Cork, this time in the final of the National Hurling League. A 7–4 to 5–5 victory gave him his first league medal.

==== Move to Tipperary ====
A transfer to Toomevara, County Tipperary in his duties as a Garda saw Howard link up with the Tipperary senior team. He played two championship campaigns with Tipp in 1931 and 1932 without success, however, he did win a Thomond Feis medal.

==== Return to Limerick ====
In 1933 overtures were made to Howard encouraging him to rejoin an up-an-coming Limerick senior team. Howard agreed and played championship hurling with his native county after an absence of a decade. His return in green and white saw an upsurge in Limerick's fortunes as the team reached the provincial decider against Waterford in 1933. With eight minutes left in the game, some spectators invaded the pitch and the match was abandoned. Since Limerick were winning by 3–7 to 1–2, the Munster Council declared them the champions and Howard collected his second Munster medal. The subsequent All-Ireland final on 3 September 1933 saw a record crowd of 45,176 travel to Croke Park to see Limerick face Kilkenny. After being level at the interval, the game remained close in the second half until a solo-run goal by Johnny Dunne sealed a 1–7 to 0–6 victory for Kilkenny.

The league campaign in 1933–34 saw Limerick reach the decider against Dublin. In spite of home advantage, Limerick had to battle hard for a 3–6 to 3–3 victory. It was Howard's second league medal. The subsequent provincial championship saw Limerick reach the decider, where they played Waterford for the second year in-a-row. The result was much the same, with Howard collecting a third Munster medal following a 4–8 to 2–5 victory. The All-Ireland final on 2 September 1934 was a special occasion as it was the golden jubilee final of the Gaelic Athletic Association. Dublin were the opponents and a close game developed. After leading by a point at the interval, Limerick went five clear with time running out. Dublin fought their way back to secure a remarkable draw. The replay on 30 September turned out to be an even closer affair, with both sides level with two minutes to go. Points from Mick Mackey and Jackie O'Connell and a remarkable four goals from Dave Clohessy secured a 5–2 to 2–6 victory for Limerick. The win gave Howard a fourth All-Ireland medal.

Howard added a third National League medal to his collection in 1935, as Limerick retained their title in a straightforward league format. Limerick dominated the provincial series of games once again, and lined out in the decider against Tipperary. Howard collected a fourth Munster medal following a 5–5 to 1–4 victory. Kilkenny were Limerick's opponents in the subsequent All-Ireland final on 1 September 1935 and, once again, the game was a close affair. Limerick were the favourites, and a record crowd of over 46,000 turned up to the game. At the beginning of the second-half Lory Meagher sent over a huge point from midfield giving Kilkenny a lead which they would not surrender. The game ended in controversial circumstances for Mick Mackey when Limerick were awarded a close-in free to level the game. Jack Keane issued an instruction from the sideline that Timmy Ryan, the team captain, was to take the free and put the sliotar over the bar for the equalising point. As he lined up to take it, Mackey pushed him aside and took the free himself. The shot dropped short and into the waiting hands of the Kilkenny goalkeeper and was cleared. The game ended shortly after with Kilkenny triumphing by 2–5 to 2–4.

Limerick began 1936 by retaining their league title, having won seven of their games and drawing one. It was Howard's fourth league medal. As a result of a tour to the United States, Limerick were awarded a bye into the Munster final. Tipperary provided the opposition in the provincial final, however, Limerick captain Mick Mackey ran riot and scored 5–3. The 8–5 to 4–6 victory gave Howard a fifth Munster medal. For the third time in four years the lure of a Kilkenny-Limerick clash brought a record crowd of over 50,000 to Croke Park for the All-Ireland decider on 6 September 1936. The first half produced a game that lived up to the previous clashes, and Limerick had a two-point advantage at half-time. Jackie Power scored two first-half goals, while a solo-run goal by captain Mackey in the second-half helped Limerick to a 5–6 to 1–5 victory. It was Howard's fifth All-Ireland medal, a record for a Limerick player. This was his last appearance for Limerick as he retired shortly afterwards.

=== Inter-provincial ===
Howard's inter-county performances ensured his selection on the inaugural Leinster team for the inter-provincial championship. A 7–6 to 3–5 defeat of Connacht gave him a Railway Cup medal.

Leinster faced defeat at the hands of Munster in the deciders of 1928 and 1929.

Howard's return to Limerick saw him included on the Munster team in 1931. A 1–12 to 2–6 defeat of Leinster gave him a second Railway Cup medal.

=== International ===
With the revival of the Tailteann Games in 1924, Howard received the ultimate honour by being one of fifteen hurlers chosen to make up an Irish hurling team. Ireland defeated a United States selection on that occasion. That same year he also played against Scotland in a shinty international.

In 1928 Howard was once again included on the Irish hurling team for the Tailteann Games. The United States were defeated by the Irish selection once again.

== Coaching career ==
=== Clare ===
At inter-county level Howard was trainer of the Clare senior hurling team for a brief period in the fifties. In 1954 he guided the team to a 3–6 to 0–12 defeat of All-Ireland runners-up Wexford in the final of the Oireachtas Cup.

In 1955 Clare defeated Cork and Tipperary in the provincial championship and were hot favourites to take the Munster title. An unfancied Limerick team upset the odds and defeated Howard's side by 2–16 to 2–6.

=== Naomh Pádraig ===
At club level Howard took charge of Naomh Pádraig, a combined Burgess and Kildangan under-21 team in the 1970s. Under him the club won back-to-back under-21 championships in 1970 and 1971.

Howard also trained the Feakle hurling team for a time.

== Recognition ==
As a hurler who claimed every honour in the game, Howard became (in 1982) the third recipient of the GAA All-Time All-Star Award.

== Personal life ==
Howard was born in Fanningstown Castle, Patrickswell, County Limerick on 10 December 1899, the second eldest son to Martin and Kate Howard who were farmers

Educated locally, Howard joined the newly formed Garda Síochána in his early twenties and served in Dublin, Toomevara, Portroe, Carrick-on-Suir and Feakle over the next forty years.

Howard was married to Josephine "Josie" Barry (1912–1990), herself a niece of Tipperary hurler Frank McGrath, and the couple had six children: Kathleen, Patricia 'Pat', Josephine 'Jo', Liz, Ann and Garrett 'Garry'.

Jo Howard was a camogie star in her own right and played for both Clare and Tipperary before serving as the secretary of the North Tipperary Bord na nÓg for ten years. Liz Howard was the first and only female analysts on the Sunday Game, before later serving as PRO of the Tipperary County Board and president of the Camogie Association. She also played camogie for Clare, Tipperary and Dublin. Pat and Ann also played camogie for Feakle. Howard's son, Garry, played under-21 hurling with Tipperary in 1972 while his grandson, also named Garrett, was a member of the Tipperary minor hurling team in 1997 and also won a Harty Cup and All Ireland Colleges title with St. Flannans College.

Howard died at Dannell Nursing Home, Borrisokane on 20 January 1995, the last surviving member of the All-Ireland-winning Limerick and Dublin teams of the 1920s and 1930s.

== Honours ==
=== Player ===
Croom

- Limerick Senior Hurling Championship (1): 1919

Garda

- Dublin Senior Hurling Championship (5): 1925, 1926, 1927, 1928, 1929

Toomevara

- Tipperary Senior Hurling Championship (2): 1930, 1931

Limerick

- All-Ireland Senior Hurling Championship (3): 1921, 1934, 1936
- Munster Senior Hurling Championship (5): 1921, 1933, 1934, 1935, 1936
- National Hurling League (3): 1933–34, 1934–35, 1935–36

Dublin

- All-Ireland Senior Hurling Championship (2): 1924, 1927
- Leinster Senior Hurling Championship (3): 1924, 1927, 1928
- National Hurling League (1): 1929–30

Tipperary

- Thomond Feis (1): 1931

Leinster

- Railway Cup (1): 1927

Munster

- Railway Cup (1): 1931

Ireland

- Tailteann Games (2): 1924, 1928

=== Trainer ===
Naomh Pádraig

- Tipperary Under-21 A Hurling Championship (2): 1970, 1971

Clare

- Oireachtas Cup (1): 1954

=== Individual ===
Awards

- GAA All-Time All-Star Award (1): 1982

Awards
Preceded by Jack Lynch (Cork)	GAA All-Time All-Star Award; 1982	Succeeded by Pa "Fowler" McInerney (Clare)
