= Leahy (surname) =

Leahy or Lehy is an Irish surname, originating in Munster, and now found in counties Cork, Kerry, Limerick, Cavan and Tipperary.

It is usually an anglicised form of the Irish language surname Ó Laochdha ("descendant of Laochdha"), which ultimately derives from Old Irish láechda, láech ("warrior-like, pertaining to a warrior") and appears as a personal sobriquet at least as early as the Book of Lismore (circa 1408–11). However, Leahy may also represent an anglicisation of less common names, including Mac Fhlaithimh and Ó Flaithimh, Mac an Leagha, Ó Leathaigh, Ó Liathaigh, Ó Líthe, Ó Laidhe, Ó Laidhigh, Ó Laithimh, Ó'Lathaigh, Ó Laithmhe, Ó Laochdha, Ó Laoi, Ó Laoidhigh, or Ó Laoithe. The Leahys of County Cavan are thought to be of Huguenot heritage [De La Haye] [5].

Not to be confused with Lahey which means "Ruler" and is a separate family lineage. Other anglicised forms of the name include Leahey, Lahy, Leehy, Leehey, Lahaie, Lahaye, Lehait, Claffey, Laffey, and Lee.

== Notable bearers of the name ==
- Ann Leahy (born 1971), Australian politician
- Daniel Leahy , American leadership trainer and former dean of bastyr
- Bernie Leahy (1908-1978), American footballer
- Caitlin Leahy (born 1988), American actress and model
- Con Leahy (1880–1921), Irish athlete
- Edward Daniel Leahy (1797–1875), Irish painter
- Edward L. Leahy (1886–1953), United States Senator
- Emmett Leahy (1910–1964), American archivist and entrepreneur
- Eugene A. Leahy (1929–2000), Mayor of Omaha, Nebraska (1969-1973)
- Frank Lahey (1880–1953), surgeon, medical educator, and founder of Boston's Lahey Clinic
- Frank Leahy (1908–1973), American football player and coach, athletics administrator and sports executive
- Georgie Leahy (1938–2017), Irish hurling manager, coach, selector and player
- Grainne Leahy (born 1966), Irish cricketer
- Sir John Leahy (diplomat) (1928–2015), British diplomat
- John Leahy (executive) (born 1950), American businessman, executive at Airbus
- John Leahy (born 1969), former Irish hurler
- John O'Lahy (executed 5 Jul 1581), sailor, and one of the Wexford Martyrs
- Kevin Leahy (disambiguation)
- Kristine Leahy (born 1986), American television host and former sports reporter
- Luke Leahy (born 1992), English footballer
- Margaret Leahy (1902–1967), British actress
- Michael Leahy (disambiguation)
- Patrick Leahy (disambiguation)
- Peter Leahy (born 1952), Chief of the Australian Army
- Sean Leahy (born 1958), Australian cartoonist
- Sir Terry Leahy (born 1956), English businessman
- Tom Leahy (Australian footballer) (1888–1964), Australian rules footballer
- William D. Leahy (1875–1959), American naval officer and ambassador
- William Harrington Leahy (1904–1986), United States Navy admiral
- William P. Leahy (born 1948), President of Boston College

== See also ==
- Leahy (disambiguation)
