= Charlie Stuart =

Irish hurler (1894–1980)

Personal information
- Native name: Cathal Stíobhart (Irish)
- Born: 6 November 1894 Ogonnelloe, County Clare, Ireland
- Died: 18 June 1980 (aged 85) Harold's Cross, Dublin, Ireland
- Occupation: Army medical officer

Sport
- Sport: Hurling
- Position: Centre-back
Clubs
- Years: Club
- Ogonnelloe; Collegians
Club titles
- Dublin titles: 3
College
- Years: College
- University College Dublin
College titles
- Fitzgibbon titles: 3
Inter-county
- Years: County
- Dublin
Inter-county titles
- Leinster titles: 2
- All-Irelands: 1

Charles Martin Stuart (6 November 1894 – 18 June 1980) was an Irish hurler. At club level he played with Collegians and at inter-county level with the Dublin senior hurling team.

== Career ==
Born and raised in Ogonnelloe, County Clare, Stuart first played hurling with the Ogonnelloe club. He progressed to inter-county level with Clare and won an All-Ireland JHC medal in 1914.

Stuart later studied medicine at University College Dublin (UCD) and continued his hurling development during his time as a student. He won three consecutive Fitzgibbon Cup medals with UCD between 1915 and 1917. Stuart later lined out with the Collegians, a team composed of medical and veterinary students, and won Dublin SHC medals in 1917, 1918 and 1919.

Collegians were the Dublin representatives at inter-county level following each of those title wins. Stuart won a Leinster SHC title as a centre-back, before beating Tipperary by 5–04 to 4–02 in the 1917 All-Ireland SHC final. Two years later, he captained the team to another Leinster SHC title, however, Dublin were later beaten by Cork in the 1919 All-Ireland SHC final.

== Personal life and death ==
Having completed his medical studies in 1922, Stuart joined the Irish army and rose to the rank of colonel and Chief of the Army Medical Corps. His brother, J. J. Stuart, served as the 19th president of the Gaelic Athletic Association (1958–1961).

Stuart died on 18 June 1980, at the age of 85.

== Honours ==
University College Dublin

- Fitzgibbon Cup (3): 1915, 1916, 1917

Collegians

- Dublin Senior Hurling Championship (3): 1917, 1918, 1919 (c)

Clare

- All-Ireland Junior Hurling Championship (1): 1914
- Munster Junior Hurling Championship (1): 1914

Dublin

- All-Ireland Senior Hurling Championship (1): 1917
- Leinster Senior Hurling Championship (2): 1917, 1919 (c)

Sporting positions
Preceded by John Ryan	Dublin senior hurling team captain 1919	Succeeded by Bob Mockler
