= Jer Collison =

Irish hurler and Gaelic footballer

Jer "Darby" Collison
Personal information
- Native name: Diarmuid Mac Coilligh (Irish)
- Nickname: Darby
- Born: 12 August 1889 Moneygall, County Offaly, Ireland
- Died: 18 June 1956 (aged 66) Moneygall, County Offaly, Ireland
- Occupation: Merchant

Sport
- Sport: Hurling
Clubs
- Years: Club
- Nenagh Éire Óg; Collegians; Moneygall; Toomevara
Inter-county
- Years: County
- 1915-1919: Tipperary
Inter-county titles
- Munster titles: 2
- All-Irelands: 1

Jeremiah Collison (12 August 1889 – 18 June 1956) was an Irish hurler and Gaelic footballer. Usually lining out in the backs, he was a member of the Tipperary team that won the 1916 All-Ireland SHC.

Collison began his club hurling with the Toomevara club, winning four championship medals between 1910 and 1914. He also played club hurling with Nenagh Éire Óg, Collegians and Moneygall.

After lining out for the Dublin senior team in the drawn 1908 All-Ireland SHC final with Tipperary, Collison subsequently joined the Tipperary team in 1915. He won his first Munster SHC medal in 1916, before later winning his sole All-Ireland SHC medal after Tipperary's defeat of Kilkenny in the final. He won a second Munster SHC medal in 1917.

Collison also had an active role as a member of the Old IRA. Appointed O/C of the No.2 Battalion North Tipperary Brigade IRA in 1918, his hurling career ended when he was imprisoned in Belfast for drilling members of the IRA. During his time at Crumlin Jail, Collison went on hunger strike. A supporter of the Anglo-Irish Treaty, Collison later served as a member of the Free State Army during the Civil War.

== Honours ==
Toomevara

- Tipperary Senior Hurling Championship (4): 1910, 1912, 1913, 1914

Tipperary

- All-Ireland Senior Hurling Championship (1): 1916
- Munster Senior Hurling Championship (2): 1916, 1917
