= 1923 Tipperary Senior Hurling Championship =

Annual hurling competition season

- Champions: Toomevara (7th title)
- Runners-up: Kilmoyler

The 1923 Tipperary Senior Hurling Championship was the 32nd staging of the Tipperary Senior Hurling Championship since its establishment by the Tipperary County Board in 1887.

Boherlahan were the defending champions.

Toomevara won the championship after a 5–04 to 3–02 defeat of Kilmoyler in the final. It was their seventh championship title overall and their first title since 1919.

== Results ==
=== Final ===
18 May 1924 Final	Toomevara	5-04 - 3-02	Kilmoyler	Tipperary Sportsfield
