= 1915 Tipperary Senior Hurling Championship =

Annual hurling competition season

- Champions: Boherlahan (1st title); Johnny Leahy (captain)
- Runners-up: Thurles

The 1915 Tipperary Senior Hurling Championship was the 26th staging of the Tipperary Senior Hurling Championship since its establishment by the Tipperary County Board in 1887.

Toomevara were the defending champions.

Boherlahan won the championship after a 4–04 to 1–02 defeat of Thurles in the final. It was their first ever championship title.
