= Patrick Leahy (disambiguation) =

Patrick Leahy (born 1940) is an American politician, who served as a United States Senator from Vermont.

Patrick Leahy may also refer to:

- Patrick Leahy (bishop) (1806–1875), Roman Catholic Archbishop of Cashel
- Patrick Leahy (Australian politician) (1860–1927), Queensland politician
- Patrick Leahy (athlete) (1877–1927), Irish Olympic athlete
- Pat Leahy (Tipperary hurler) (1857–?), Irish hurler for Tipperary
- Pat Leahy (Cork hurler) (1878–1950), Irish hurler for Cork
- Paddy Leahy (1892–1966), Irish hurler for Tipperary
- Paddy Leahy (footballer) (1874–1955), Australian rules footballer
- Pat Leahy (Australian footballer) (1917–2009), Australian rules footballer
- Patrick Leahy (doctor) (1917–1998), Irish doctor
- Pat Leahy (American football) (born 1951), placekicker
- Pat Leahy (ice hockey) (born 1979), ice hockey right wing
- Patrick F. Leahy, American academic administrator
- Patrick Leahy (Nebraska politician), American politician
