= Con Lucy =

Irish hurler and Gaelic footballer

Personal information
- Native name: Conn Ó Luasaigh (Irish)
- Born: 6 February 1899 Dunmanway, County Cork, Ireland
- Died: 14 July 1929 (aged 30) Newcastle, County Dublin, Ireland
- Occupation: Medical doctor

Sport
- Sport: Hurling
- Position: Centre-forward
Clubs
- Years: Club
- Fr. O'Leary Hall; Collegians
Club titles
- Cork titles: 0
Inter-county
Years	County	Apps (scores)
1918-1922	Cork	7 (8-02)
Inter-county titles
- Munster titles: 2
- All-Irelands: 1

Cornelius Lucy (6 February 1899 – 14 July 1929) was an Irish hurler and Gaelic footballer. His championship career with the Cork senior teams lasted from 1916 until 1922.

Lucy first played competitive inter-county football at the age of seventeen when he was selected for the Cork senior team. He made his debut during the 1916 championship and won a Munster medal in his first season. Lucy later joined the Cork senior hurling team and won an All-Ireland medal in 1919. He also won back-to-back Munster medals. Lucy played his last game for Cork in May 1922.

== Honours ==
Cork

- All-Ireland Senior Hurling Championship (1): 1919
- Munster Senior Hurling Championship (2): 1919, 1920
- Munster Senior Football Championship (1): 1916
