= 1916 Tipperary Senior Hurling Championship =

Annual hurling competition season

- Champions: Boherlahan (2nd title); Johnny Leahy (captain)
- Runners-up: Toomevara

The 1916 Tipperary Senior Hurling Championship was the 27th staging of the Tipperary Senior Hurling Championship since its establishment by the Tipperary County Board in 1887.

Boherlahan were the defending champions.

Boherlahan won the championship after a 2–02 to 0–00 defeat of Toomevara in the final. It was their second championship title overall and their second title in succession.
