= 1918 Tipperary Senior Hurling Championship =

Annual hurling competition season

- Champions: Boherlahan (4th title); Johnny Leahy (captain)
- Runners-up: Toomevara

The 1918 Tipperary Senior Hurling Championship was the 29th staging of the Tipperary Senior Hurling Championship since its establishment by the Tipperary County Board in 1887.

Boherlahan were the defending champions.

Toomevara defeated Boherlahan by 6–00 to 3–04 in the final, however, Boherlahan were later awarded the title after a successful objection. It was their fourth championship title overall and their fourth title in succession.
