= Leahy (disambiguation) =

Leahy is a Canadian folk rock band.

Leahy may also refer to:

- Leahy (surname), people with the surname Leahy
- USS Leahy (DLG-16), a US Navy destroyer leader
- Leahy class cruiser, a class of US guided missile cruisers
- Leahy, Washington, United States
- Leahy Law, governing US military assistance to foreign military units
- Cape Leahy, in Antarctica
- Leahy (album)

== See also ==
- Leahey, a surname
- Leakey (disambiguation)
