= 1922 Tipperary Senior Hurling Championship =

Annual hurling competition season

- Champions: Boherlahan (5th title); Johnny Leahy (captain)
- Runners-up: Toomevara

The 1922 Tipperary Senior Hurling Championship was the 31st staging of the Tipperary Senior Hurling Championship since its establishment by the Tipperary County Board in 1887, held after a two-year hiatus.

Toomevara were the defending champions.

Boherlahan won the championship after a 5–01 to 2–03 defeat of a Toomevara in the final. It was their fifth championship title overall and their first title since 1919.

== Results ==
=== Final ===
14 October 1923 Final	Boherlahan	5-01 - 2-03	Toomevara	Thurles Sportsfield
