= 1917 Tipperary Senior Hurling Championship =

Annual hurling competition season

- Champions: Boherlahan (3rd title); Johnny Leahy (captain)
- Runners-up: Toomevara

The 1917 Tipperary Senior Hurling Championship was the 28th staging of the Tipperary Senior Hurling Championship since its establishment by the Tipperary County Board in 1887.

Boherlahan were the defending champions.

Boherlahan won the championship after a 2–02 to 1–01 defeat of Toomevara in the final. It was their third championship title overall and their third title in succession.
