= Ogonnelloe (parish) =

Catholic parish in County Clare, Ireland

- Roman Catholic parish
- Location in Ireland
- Coordinates: 52°53′0″N 8°27′30.8″W
- Country: Ireland
- Province: Munster
- County: County Clare
- Time zone: UTC+0 (WET)
  - Summer (DST): UTC-1 (IST (WEST))

Ogonnelloe is a parish in County Clare, Ireland, and part of the Inis Cealtra grouping of parishes within the Roman Catholic Diocese of Killaloe.

As of 2022, the co-parish priest is Kieran Blake.

The present parish contains the mediaeval parish and a section of the mediaeval parish of Killaloe. This section was transferred in the early nineteenth century.

== Churches ==
The main church is the St. Molua's Church in the townland Ballybran, Ogonnelloe. This church is built in 1839–1840.

The second church in the parish is the Church of St. Mary in het townland Ballylaghnane. This cruciform church was built in 1801 but later extended.

== Gallery ==
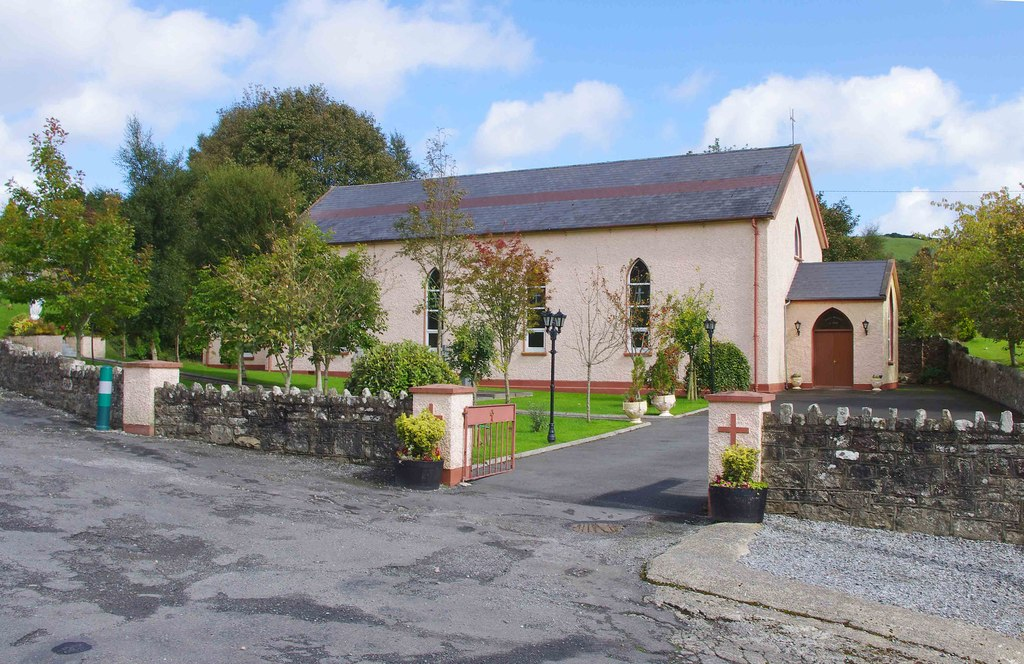
St. Molua's Church in the townland Ballybran

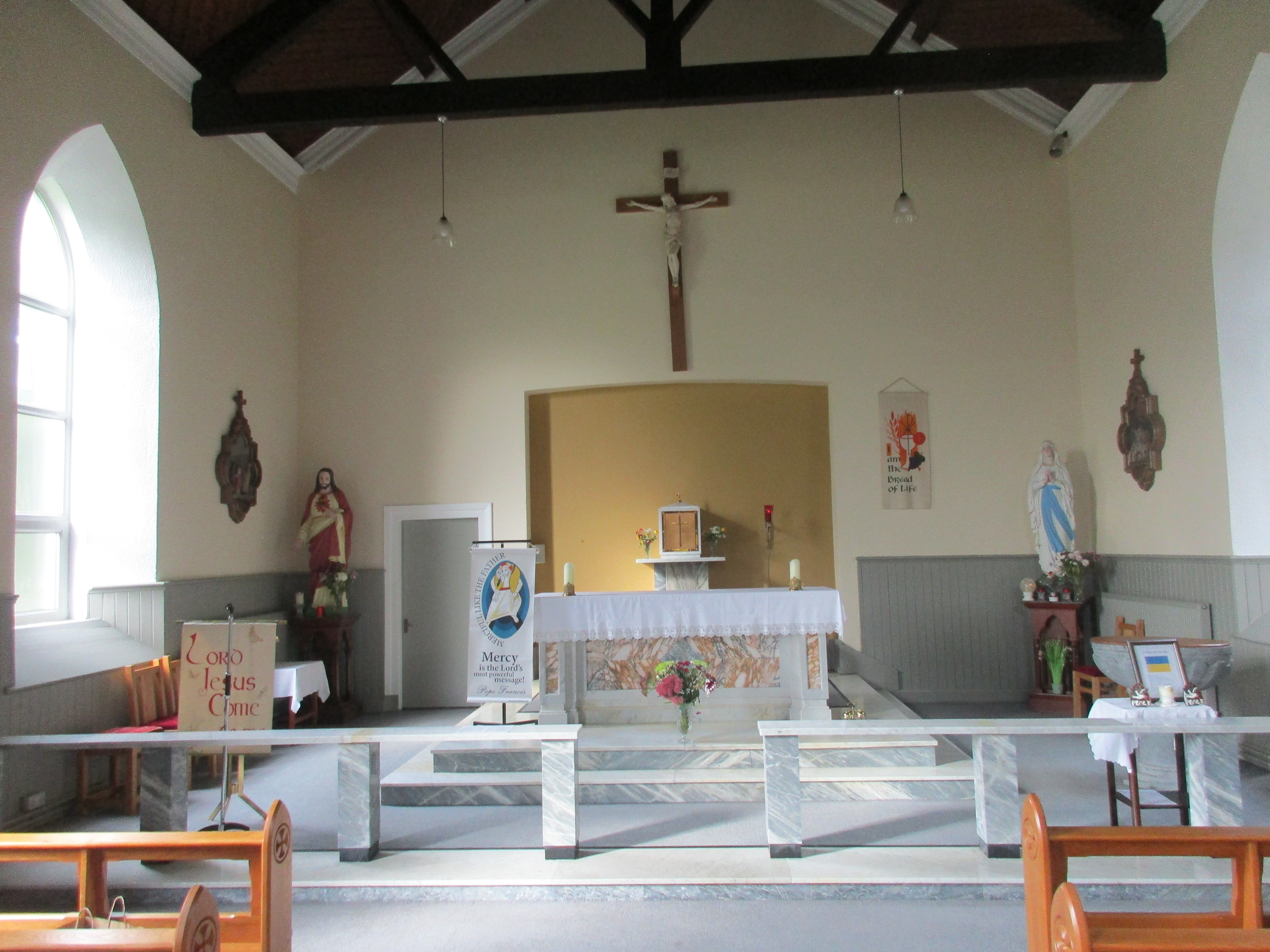
Altar of St. Molua's Church
