= Dick O'Gorman =

Irish hurler

Personal information
- Native name: Ristéard Ó Gormain (Irish)
- Born: 23 December 1892 Midleton, County Cork, Ireland
- Died: 17 February 1963 (aged 70) Cork, Ireland
- Occupation: Grocer

Sport
- Sport: Hurling
- Position: Full-forward
Club
- Years: Club
- Midleton
Club titles
- Cork titles: 1
Inter-county
Years	County	Apps (scores)
1913-1925	Cork	13 (3-05)
Inter-county titles
- Munster titles: 2
- All-Irelands: 1

Richard O'Gorman (23 December 1892 – 17 February 1963) was an Irish hurler who played for Cork Championship club Midleton. He played for the Cork senior hurling team for a number of years, during which time he usually lined out in the forwards.

== Honours ==
Midleton

- Cork Senior Hurling Championship (1): 1916

Cork

- All-Ireland Senior Hurling Championship (1): 1919
- Munster Senior Hurling Championship (2): 1919, 1920

Sporting positions
Preceded by Jimmy Kennedy	Cork Senior Hurling Captain; 1920	Succeeded by
