= Paddy Power (hurler) =

Irish hurler

Personal information
- Native name: Pádraig de Paor (Irish)
- Born: 1895 Nodstown, County Tipperary, Ireland
- Died: 1967 (aged 71–72)
- Occupation: Agricultural labourer

Sport
- Sport: Hurling
Club
- Years: Club
- Boherlahan–Dualla
Inter-county
- Years: County
- 1917-1925: Tipperary
Inter-county titles
- Munster titles: 3
- All-Irelands: 1

Patrick Power (1895 — 1967) was an Irish hurler who played as a centre-forward for the Tipperary senior team.

Power made his first appearance for the team during the 1917 championship and was a regular member of the starting fifteen until his retirement after the 1925 championship. During that time he won one All-Ireland medal and three Munster medals.

At club level Power was a multiple county championship medalist with Boherlahan–Dualla.

His brother Jack also played with Tipperary.

He died in 1967.
