= Tommy Leahy (Tipperary hurler) =

Irish hurler

Personal information
- Native name: Tomás Ó Laocha (Irish)
- Born: 16 November 1905 Tubberadora, County Tipperary, Ireland
- Died: 17 October 1981 (aged 75) New Inn, County Tipperary, Ireland
- Occupation: Farmer

Sport
- Sport: Hurling
- Position: Left wing-forward
Club
- Years: Club
- Boherlahan
Club titles
- Tipperary titles: 4
Inter-county
- Years: County
- 1927-1934: Tipperary
Inter-county titles
- Munster titles: 1
- All-Irelands: 1
- NHL: 0

Thomas Leahy (16 November 1905 – 17 October 1981) was an Irish hurler. At club level he played for Boherlahan and was the left wing-forward on the Tipperary senior hurling team that won the 1930 All-Ireland Championship.

A native of Tubberadora, County Tipperary, Leahy played his club hurling with Boherlahan and won four Tipperary Senior Championship medals between 1924 and 1928.

Leahy made his first appearance for the Tipperary senior hurling team during the 1927 Munster Championship. In the following years he had several successes, including a Munster Championship medal, and an All-Ireland Championship medal. The latter coming when Tipperary defeated Dublin in the final in 1930.

Leahy's brothers, Paddy, Mick and Johnny, were also All-Ireland medal winners.

== Honours ==
Boherlahan

- Tipperary Senior Hurling Championship (4): 1924, 1925, 1927, 1928

Tipperary

- All-Ireland Senior Hurling Championship (1): 1930
- Munster Senior Hurling Championship (1): 1930

Munster

- Railway Cup (1): 1931
