= Jack Power (hurler) =

Irish hurler

Personal information
- Native name: Seán de Paor (Irish)
- Born: 1891 Nodstown, County Tipperary, Ireland
- Died: 1977 (aged 85–86) New York, United States
- Occupation: Agricultural labourer

Sport
- Sport: Hurling
Club
- Years: Club
- Boherlahan–Dualla
Inter-county
- Years: County
- 1916-1925: Tipperary
Inter-county titles
- Munster titles: 4
- All-Irelands: 2

Jack Power (1891 — 1977) was an Irish hurler who played as a left wing-back for the Tipperary senior team.

Power made his first appearance for the team during the 1916 championship and was a regular member of the starting fifteen until his retirement after the 1925 championship. During that time he won two All-Ireland medals and four Munster medals.

At club level Power was a multiple county championship medalist with Boherlahan–Dualla.

His brother Paddy was also an All-Ireland medalist with Tipperary.

He emigrated to the United States later in life. He died in New York in 1977.
