= 1912 Cork Junior Hurling Championship =

Irish hurling competition

- Champions: Fr O'Leary Hall (1st title); John Murphy (captain)
- Runners-up: Cobh; Pat Sullivan (captain)

The 1912 Cork Junior Hurling Championship was the 18th staging of the Cork Junior Hurling Championship since its establishment by the Cork County Board in 1895.

The final was played on 20 October 1912 at the Athletic Grounds in Carrigtwohill, between Fr O'Leary Hall and Cobh, in what was their first ever meeting in the final. Fr O'Leary Hall won the match by 6-00 to 0-00 to claim their first ever championship title.

== Results ==
=== Final ===
14 December 1913 Final	Fr O'Leary Hall	6-00 - 0-00	Cobh	Carrigtwohill Athletic Grounds
