= Killaloe =

Killaloe may refer to:

== Australia ==
- Killaloe, Queensland, a rural locality in the Shire of Douglas

== Canada ==
- Killaloe, Ontario

== Ireland ==
- Killaloe, County Clare
- Killaloe (parish)
- Killaloe, County Clare (Civil parish)
- Diocese of Killaloe, County Clare
- Roman Catholic Diocese of Killaloe, County Clare
- Killaloe March, Regimental music of the Royal Irish Regiment
