= 1920 All-Ireland Senior Hurling Championship =

Championship details
- Dates: 9 May 1920 – 14 May 1922
- Teams: 14

All-Ireland champions
- Winning team: Dublin (3rd win)
- Captain: Bob Mockler

All-Ireland Finalists
- Losing team: Cork
- Captain: Dick O'Gorman

Provincial champions
- Munster: Cork
- Leinster: Dublin
- Ulster: Not Played
- Connacht: Not Played

Championship statistics
- No. matches played: 12
- Goals total: 94 (7.83 per game)
- Points total: 84 (7.oo per game)
- All-Star Team: See here

The 1920 All-Ireland Senior Hurling Championship was the 34th staging of the All-Ireland Senior Hurling Championship, the Gaelic Athletic Association's premier inter-county hurling tournament. The championship began on 9 May 1920 but wasn't completed until 14 May 1922 due to the ongoing War of Independence.

Cork were the defending champions.

The All-Ireland final was played at Croke Park in Dublin on 14 May 1922 between Dublin and Cork, in what was their fifth championship meeting overall and a second consecutive meeting in the All-Ireland final. Dublin won the match by 4–09 to 4–03 to claim their third All-Ireland title overall and a first title in three years.

== Teams ==
A total of fourteen teams contested the championship, the same as the previous championship; however, there were some changes of personnel, with Westmeath replacing Laois in the Leinster Senior Hurling Championship.

== Leinster Senior Hurling Championship ==
=== Leinster first round ===
9 May 1920 First round	Louth	5–02 – 3–04	Meath	Dundalk Grounds

=== Leinster quarter-finals ===
13 June 1920 Quarter-final	Westmeath	w/o – scr.	Louth	Páirc Tailteann

13 June 1920 Quarter-final	Dublin	8–06 – 2–03	Offaly	Croke Park

=== Leinster semi-finals ===
18 May 1920 Semi-final	Wexford	4–01 – 8–00	Kilkenny	New Ross Grounds

4 July 1920 Semi-final	Dublin	8–06 – 3–02	Westmeath	Croke Park

=== Leinster final ===
18 July 1920 Final	Kilkenny	2–02 – 4–05	Dublin	Croke Park

== Munster Senior Hurling Championship ==
=== Munster quarter-finals ===
6 June 1920 Quarter-final	Clare	2–02 – 5–03	Tipperary	Ennis Grounds

13 June 1920 Quarter-final	Waterford	0–00 – 10–03	Limerick	Fraher Field

=== Munster semi-finals ===
13 June 1920 Semi-final	Kerry	2–03 – 2–05	Cork	Tralee Sportsfield

8 August 1920 Semi-final	Limerick	5–07 – 3–03	Tipperary	Riverstown Sportsfield

=== Munster final ===
2 April 1922 Final	Cork	3–04 – 0–05	Limerick	Cork Athletic Grounds

== All-Ireland Senior Hurling Championship ==
=== All-Ireland semi-final ===
24 October 1920 Semi-final	Dublin	6–02 – 1–04	Galway	Croke Park

=== All-Ireland final ===
14 May 1922 Final	Dublin	4–09 – 4–03	Cork	Croke Park

== Championship statistics ==
=== Miscellaneous ===
- The Munster final between Cork and Limerick was originally scheduled for 29 August 1920; however, due to the hunger strike of the Lord Mayor of Cork Terence MacSwiney, the game did not take place until 2 April 1922.
- Not one of the Dublin hurling team that won the All-Ireland final was born in Dublin.

== Sources ==
- Corry, Eoghan, The GAA Book of Lists (Hodder Headline Ireland, 2005).
- Donegan, Des, The Complete Handbook of Gaelic Games (DBA Publications Limited, 2005).
