= Jim Murphy (hurler) =

Irish hurler

Personal information
- Native name: Séamus Ó Murchú (Irish)
- Nickname: Spud

Sport
- Sport: Hurling
- Position: Centre-back
Clubs
- Years: Club
- Fr. O'Leary Hall; St Finbarr's
Club titles
- Cork titles: 4
Inter-county*
| Years | County | Apps (scores) |
| 1915–1919 | Cork | 5 (0-00) |
Inter-county titles
- Munster titles: 3
- All-Irelands: 1
- *Inter County team apps and scores correct as of 17:34, 7 April 2018.

Jim Murphy was an Irish hurler. His championship career at senior level with the Cork county team lasted from 1912 until 1919.

Born in Cork, Murphy first played competitive hurling with the St Finbarr's club. During a successful period for the club, he won four county championship medals.

Murphy made his debut with the Cork senior team during the 1912 championship and went on to become a regular member of the team at various times over the following few years. During this time he won one All-Ireland medal. Murphy also won three Munster medals.

== Honours ==
St Finbarr's

- Cork Senior Hurling Championship (1): 1919, 1922, 1923, 1926

Cork

- All-Ireland Senior Hurling Championship (1): 1919
- Munster Senior Hurling Championship (3): 1912, 1915, 1919
