= Denis Walsh (Tipperary hurler) =

Irish hurler

Personal information
- Native name: Donncha Breathnach (Irish)
- Born: 10 February 1877 Tubberadora, County Tipperary, Ireland
- Died: 22 December 1952 (aged 75) Fethard, County Tipperary, Ireland
- Occupation: Agricultural labourer

Sport
- Sport: Hurling
- Position: Midfield
Clubs
- Years: Club
- Tubberadora; Boherlahan–Dualla
Inter-county
- Years: County
- 1895-1916: Tipperary
Inter-county titles
- Munster titles: 5
- All-Irelands: 5

Denis Walsh (10 February 1877 – 22 December 1952) was an Irish hurler. His championship career with the Tipperary senior team spanned three decades from 1895 until 1916.

Walsh first came to prominence on the inter-county scene at the age of 21 when he was selected for the Tipperary senior team. He made his debut during the delayed 1895 championship and quickly became a regular member of the team. In an inter-county career that spanned twenty years, Walsh won five All-Ireland medals, beginning with four championships in-a-row between 1895 and 1899 and ending with a fifth and final winners' medal in 1916.

== Honours ==
Tipperary

- All-Ireland Senior Hurling Championship (5): 1895, 1896, 1898, 1899, 1916
- Munster Senior Hurling Championship (5): 1895, 1896, 1898, 1899, 1916
