= 1919 Tipperary Senior Hurling Championship =

Annual hurling competition season

- Champions: Toomevara (6th title)
- Runners-up: Mid Selection

The 1919 Tipperary Senior Hurling Championship was the 30th staging of the Tipperary Senior Hurling Championship since its establishment by the Tipperary County Board in 1887.

Boherlahan were the defending champions.

Toomevara won the championship after a 3–00 to 1–05 defeat of a Mid Selection in the final. It was their sixth championship title overall and their first title since 1914.
