= Cork–Dublin hurling rivalry =

Cork-Dublin
- Location: County Cork; County Dublin
- Teams: Cork; Dublin
- First meeting: Cork 5-20 - 2-0 Dublin; 1894 All-Ireland final (24 March 1895)
- Latest meeting: Cork 7-26 - 2-21 Dublin; 2025 All-Ireland semi-final (5 July 2025)
- Next meeting: TBA

Statistics
- Total meetings: 19
- All-time series: Championship: Cork 16-2 Dublin (1 draw)
- Largest victory: Cork 7-26 - 2-21 Dublin; 2025 All-Ireland semi-final (5 July 2025)

The Cork-Dublin rivalry is a hurling rivalry between Irish county teams Cork and Dublin, who first played each other in 1895. The fixture has been an irregular one due to both teams playing in separate provinces. Cork's home ground is Páirc Uí Chaoimh and Dublin's home ground is Parnell Park, however, most of their championship meetings have been held at neutral venues, usually Croke Park.

While Cork are regarded as one of the "big three" of hurling, with Kilkenny and Tipperary completing the trio, Dublin are ranked joint fifth in the all-time roll of honour and have enjoyed sporadic periods of dominance at various stages throughout the history of the championship. The two teams have won a combined total of 36 All-Ireland Senior Hurling Championship titles.

As of 2026, Cork and Dublin have met nineteen times in the hurling championship where Cork hold the upper hand with sixteen victories to Dublin's two triumphs.

== Roots ==
=== History ===
Meetings between Cork and Dublin have been rare throughout the history of the championship, however, there have been some periods of dominance with more frequent clashes. Between 1919 and 1928 Cork and Dublin dominated the championship. The teams clashed in four All-Ireland finals, with both sides recording two victories each. Again, between 1941 and 1944 Cork and Dublin met in three All-Ireland finals in four years. Cork dominated the championship during this era, winning a record-setting four All-Ireland titles in succession.

== Statistics ==
Up to date as of 2023 season

Team	All-Ireland	Provincial	National League	Total
Cork	30	54	14	98
Dublin	6	24	3	33
Combined	36	78	17	131

== Notable moments ==
- Cork 5-20 : 2-0 Dublin (24 March 1895 at Clonturk Park) - The very first championship clash between Cork, represented by Blackrock, and Dublin, represented by Rapparees, was the delayed 1894 All-Ireland final. Cork entered the game in search of history by becoming the first team to win three successive All-Ireland championships, while Dublin received a bye to the final as they faced no opposition in Leinster. A day of wind, rain and hail saw Cork play a defensive game. A half-time score of 2-5 to 2-0 was not enough for Dublin as Cork played with a strong wind in the second half. Dublin were held scoreless as Cork recorded a further 3-15 in the second half.
- Dublin 4-8 : 1-3 Cork (4 September 1927 at Croke Park) - Reigning All-Ireland champions Cork were confident of retaining their title as they faced Dublin in the All-Ireland final. The team contained household names and some of the greatest hurlers ever to play the game, while the Dublin team was made up entirely of non-Dublinmen. Goalkeeper Tommy Daly gave an inspirational display and at half-time Dublin were ahead by 2-3 o 0-1. The writing was on the wall as Dublin went on to dominate the second-half and secure only their second ever victory over Cork.

== All-time results ==
=== Legend ===
Cork win
Dublin win
Drawn game

=== Senior ===
No.	Date	Winners	Score	Runners-up	Venue	Competition
1.	24 March 1895	Cork (1)	5-20 - 2-0	Dublin	Clonturk Park	All-Ireland final
2.	3 July 1904	Cork	1-7 - 1-7	Dublin	Tipperary	All-Ireland home final
3.	17 July 1904	Cork (2)	2-6 - 0-1	Dublin	Tipperary	All-Ireland home final replay
4.	21 September 1919	Cork (3)	6-4 - 2-4	Dublin	Croke Park	All-Ireland final
5.	14 May 1922	Dublin (1)	4-9 - 4-3	Cork	Croke Park	All-Ireland final
6.	4 September 1927	Dublin (2)	4-8 - 1-3	Cork	Croke Park	All-Ireland final
7.	26 August 1928	Cork (4)	5-3 - 0-2	Dublin	Nowlan Park	All-Ireland semi-final
8.	28 September 1941	Cork (5)	5-11 - 0-6	Dublin	Croke Park	All-Ireland final
9.	6 September 1942	Cork (6)	2-14 - 3-4	Dublin	Croke Park	All-Ireland final
10.	3 September 1944	Cork (7)	2-13 - 1-2	Dublin	Croke Park	All-Ireland final
11.	7 September 1952	Cork (8)	2-14 - 0-7	Dublin	Croke Park	All-Ireland final
12.	30 June 2007	Cork (9)	3-20 - 0-15	Dublin	Parnell Park	All-Ireland qualifier
13.	12 July 2008	Cork (10)	1-17 - 0-15	Dublin	Páirc Uí Chaoimh	All-Ireland qualifier
14.	11 August 2013	Cork (11)	1-24 - 1-19	Dublin	Croke Park	All-Ireland semi-final
15.	2 July 2016	Cork (12)	1-26 - 1-23	Dublin	Páirc Uí Rinn	All-Ireland qualifier
16.	14 November 2020	Cork (13)	1-25 - 0-22	Dublin	Semple Stadium	All-Ireland qualifier
17.	1 August 2021	Cork (14)	2-26 - 0-24	Dublin	Semple Stadium	All-Ireland quarter-final
18.	22 June 2024	Cork (15)	0-26 - 0-21	Dublin	Semple Stadium	All-Ireland quarter-final
19.	5 July 2025	Cork (16)	7-26 - 2-21	Dublin	Croke Park	All-Ireland semi-final

=== Junior ===
No.	Date	Winners	Score	Runners-up	Venue	Competition
1.	4 July 1926	Cork (1)	5-6 - 1-00	Dublin	Thurles Sportsfield	All-Ireland final
2.	18 September 1932	Dublin (1)	2-7 - 3-2	Cork	St. Cronan's Park	All-Ireland semi-final
3.	31 August 1947	Cork (2)	4-10 - 2-5	Dublin	Thurles Sportsfield	All-Ireland home final
4.	1 October 1950	Cork (3)	3-4 - 2-5	Dublin	Walsh Park	All-Ireland home final

=== Minor ===
No.	Date	Winners	Score	Runners-up	Venue	Competition
1.	1 September 1929	Cork	1-8 - 3-2	Dublin	Croke Park	All-Ireland final
2.	27 October 1929	Cork (1)	7-6 - 4-0	Dublin	Cork Athletic Grounds	All-Ireland final replay
3.	4 September 1938	Cork (2)	7-2 - 5-4	Dublin	Croke Park	All-Ireland final
4.	4 August 2007	Cork (3)	2-10 - 0-13	Dublin	O'Moore Park	All-Ireland semi-final
