= 1901 Tipperary Senior Hurling Championship =

Annual hurling competition season

- Champions: Ballytarsna (1st title)
- Runners-up: Lahorna De Wets

The 1901 Tipperary Senior Hurling Championship was the 12th staging of the Tipperary Senior Hurling Championship since its establishment by the Tipperary County Board in 1887.

Ballytarsna won the championship after a 7–11 to 0–01 defeat of Lahorna De Wets in the final. It was the club's only championship title.
