= Castlebawn =

Tower house, County Clare, Ireland

Coordinates: 52°53′56.18″N 8°28′46.76″W

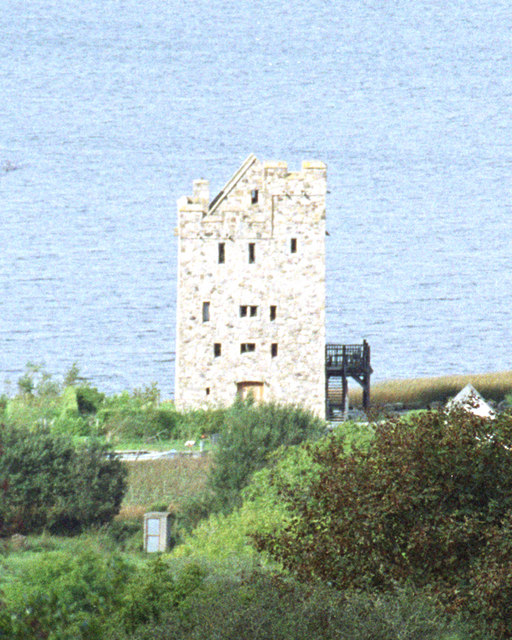

Castlebawn is a 16th-century tower house, in County Clare, Ireland. It is on a small island on Lough Derg on the River Shannon, it is connected to the shore of Bealkelly by a man-made causeway. It was built by the McNamaras about 1540, severely damaged in 1827, but is now restored although public access is not permitted to the castle.

== History ==
Castlebawn was built by Owen McNamara during an unknown year in the 16th century. The earliest recorded mention of Castlebawn is 1570, when Sean McNamara, Chief of eastern Clann-Cuilein, died, leaving Castlebawn to his son, Sir John McNamara. The McNamaras lived there until the 17th century.

In 1820 it became a den for illicit poitín makers and in 1827 the authorities besieged the towerhouse to drive the occupants out. After the towerhouse was emptied the authorities attempted to demolish the building with explosives. Only the south wall and roof were destroyed. The remaining walls although damaged remained intact. The castle was so well built that three of the walls remained intact.

Simon Flannery occupied the castle early in the 20th century, and locally the castle is still referred to as Simon's Castle.

In 1929 the construction of the Ardnacrusha power plant caused the water level in Lough Derg to rise significantly shrinking the island on which the towerhouse stands.

== Restoration ==
It was restored from ruin by Pat and Mary Cody
