= Frank McGrath =

Frank McGrath may refer to:

- Frank McGrath (actor) (1903–1967), American television actor
- Frank McGrath (footballer) (1917–2008), Australian rules footballer
- Frank McGrath (hurler) (1885–?), Irish hurler and manager
- Frank McGrath (bodybuilder) (born 1978), IFBB professional bodybuilder
- Frank McGrath (American football) (1904–1990), American football player
