= John Ryan (Dublin hurler) =

Irish hurler and physician

Personal information
- Native name: Seán Ó Riain (Irish)
- Born: 23 March 1890 Pallasgreen, County Limerick, Ireland
- Died: 1 April 1943 (aged 53) Leeson Street, Dublin, Ireland
- Occupation: Medical officer
- Height: 6 ft 3 in (191 cm)

Sport
- Sport: Hurling
Club
- Years: Club
- Collegians
Club titles
- Dublin titles: 3
College
- Years: College
- University College Dublin
College titles
- Fitzgibbon titles: 3
Inter-county
- Years: County
- 1917-1919: Dublin
Inter-county titles
- Leinster titles: 2
- All-Irelands: 1

John M. Ryan (23 March 1890 – 1 April 1943) was an Irish hurler. At club level he played with Collegians, and also lined out at inter-county level with the Dublin senior hurling team.

== Career ==
Ryan first played hurling in his local area in Pallasgreen, County Limerick. As a medical student, he later lined out with the University College Dublin team and captained the team to three successive Fitzgibbon Cup titles. After completing his studies, Ryan played with the Collegians club, whom he captained to Dublin SHC victories in 1917 and 1918, before relinquishing the captaincy and winning a third title in 1919.

The success of the Collegians club resulted in Ryan being made captain of the Dublin senior hurling team in 1917. He won his first Leinster SHC medal that year before captaining Dublin to the All-Ireland SHC title after a defeat of Tipperary in the final. Ryan was again captain the following year as Dublin surrendered their titles, however, he claimed a second Leinster SHC medal in 1919. He also lined out when Dublin were beaten by Cork in the 1919 All-Ireland final.

== Personal life and death ==
During the 1916 Easter Rising, Ryan was a medical student based at Richmond Hospital. He later spent three years as house surgeon at Jervis Street Hospital before setting up his own private practice. He attended many wounded men and sheltered them in his home during the War of Independence. Ryan became the first medical officer to the Dublin Metropolitan branch of the Garda Síochána when the force was set up in 1922. He also oversaw the establishment of the Army Medical Services.

Ryan died at St Vincent's Private Nursing Home, Dublin on 1 April 1943, at the age of 53.

== Honours ==
University College Dublin

- Fitzgibbon Cup: 1915, 1916 (c), 1917 (c)

Collegians

- Dublin Senior Hurling Championship: 1917 (c), 1918 (c), 1919

Dublin

- All-Ireland Senior Hurling Championship: 1917 (c)
- Leinster Senior Hurling Championship: 1917 (c), 1919

Sporting positions
Preceded by	Dublin senior hurling team captain 1917-1918	Succeeded by Charlie Stuart
Achievements
Preceded by Johnny Leahy	All-Ireland Senior Hurling Final winning captain 1917	Succeeded by Willie Hough
