= Paddy Leahy =

Irish hurler (1892–1966)

Personal information
- Native name: Pádraig Ó Liathaigh (Irish)
- Born: 17 March 1892 Tubberadora, County Tipperary, Ireland
- Died: 15 May 1966 (aged 73)
- Occupation: Farmer

Sport
- Sport: Hurling
- Position: Midfield
Club
- Years: Club
- Boherlahan–Dualla
Club titles
- Tipperary titles: 9
Inter-county
- Years: County
- 1916-1927: Tipperary
Inter-county titles
- Munster titles: 4
- All-Irelands: 2
- NHL: 1

Patrick Leahy (17 March 1892 – 15 May 1966) was an Irish hurler who played as a midfielder for the Tipperary senior team.

Leahy made his first appearance for the team during the 1916 championship and was a regular member of the starting fifteen until his retirement after the 1927 championship. During that time he won two All-Ireland medals, four Munster medals and one National Hurling League medal.

At club level Leahy was a multiple county club championship medalist with Boherlahan–Dualla.

Leahy was the member of a hurling 'dynasty' in Tipperary. His older brother Johnny was a two-time All-Ireland-winning captain. His younger brothers, Mick and Tommy, also won All-Ireland medals.

In retirement from hurling Leahy became involved in coaching. He was chairman of the selection committee for eight All-Ireland victories for Tipperary between 1949 and 1965.
