= Fr. O'Leary Hall GAA =

Fr. O'Leary Hall
- Halla an Athair Uí Laoghaire
- Founded: 1908
- County: Cork
- Colours: Red and white

Playing kits
Standard colours

Senior Club Championships
| | All Ireland | Munster champions | Cork champions |
|---|---|---|---|
| Hurling: | 0 | 0 | 0 |

Fr. O'Leary Temperance Association Hall GAA was a Gaelic Athletic Association club located in Cork, Ireland. The club was solely concerned with the game of hurling.

== History ==
The Fr. O'Leary Total Abstinence Hall GAA club was founded in Cork in 1908. After successes in a number of Saturday and Sunday Leagues in 1910 and 1911, the club won the County Junior Championship in 1912. The club played in the County Intermediate Championship up to 1917 and spent a year in the County Senior Championship in 1918. Fr. O'Leary Hall amalgamated with the nearby St Finbarr's National Hurling & Football Club in 1919. That same year the club donated their now defunct kit to the Cork senior hurling team who were due to play Dublin in the All-Ireland final. In the week leading up to the game, British forces broke into the county board offices on Maylor Street in the city centre and seized the regular Cork jerseys. Cork went on to win the game, ending a sixteen-year spell without a trophy. Following this win Cork decided to wear the 'lucky' red jerseys in their future games.

== Honours ==
- Cork Junior Hurling Championship: 1912
- Cork Minor Hurling Championship: 1912

== Notable players ==
- John Dorney
- Con Lucy
- Jim Murphy
- Connie Neenan
- Dannix Ring
