= Arthur O'Donnell =

Irish hurler

Personal information
- Native name: Artúr Ó Domhnaill (Irish)
- Born: 9 March 1890 Boherlahan, County Tipperary, Ireland
- Died: 23 December 1954 (aged 64) Ballytarsna, County Tipperary, Ireland
- Occupation: Store hand

Sport
- Sport: Hurling
- Position: Goalkeeper
Club
- Years: Club
- Boherlahan–Dualla
Club titles
- Tipperary titles: 9
Inter-county
- Years: County
- 1915–1928: Tipperary
Inter-county titles
- Munster titles: 4
- All-Irelands: 2

Arthur O'Donnell (9 March 1890 – 23 December 1954) was an Irish hurler who played as a goalkeeper for the Tipperary senior team.

== Playing career ==
O'Donnell made his first appearance for the team during the 1915 championship and was a regular member of the starting fifteen until his retirement after the 1928 championship. During that time he won two All-Ireland medals and four Munster medals.

At club level, O'Donnell was a multiple county championship medalist with Boherlahan–Dualla.

== Personal life and death ==
O'Donnell was born in the townland of Ballinree, just outside Cashel, County Tipperary, the fourth of six children of James and his second wife Bridget (née Gorman). After completing his education, he worked on the family farm before later finding employment as a store hand.

O'Donnell, aged 64, died from bronchitis on 23 December 1954 at his sister's residence in Ballytarsna, County Tipperary.
