= Connie Neenan =

Irish hurler

Personal information
- Native name: Conchúr Ó Naíonáin (Irish)
- Born: 7 August 1894 The Lough, Cork, Ireland
- Died: 25 July 1979 (aged 84) College Road, Cork, Ireland
- Occupation: Salesman

Sport
- Sport: Hurling
- Position: Midfield
Clubs
- Years: Club
- Fr. O'Leary Hall; St Finbarr's; Lees
Club titles
- Cork titles: 1
Inter-county
| Years | County | Apps (scores) |
| 1921 | Cork | 1 (0-01) |
Inter-county titles
- Munster titles: 0
- All-Irelands: 0

Cornelius Neenan (7 August 1894 – 25 July 1979) was an Irish hurler who played for Cork Senior Championship club St Finbarr's. He also had a brief career at senior level with the Cork county team, during which he lined out at midfield.

== Honours ==
St Finbarr's

- Cork Senior Hurling Championship (1): 1919

Cork

- All-Ireland Junior Hurling Championship (1): 1916
- Munster Junior Hurling Championship (1): 1916
