= 1914 Tipperary Senior Hurling Championship =

Annual hurling competition season

- Champions: Toomevara (5th title)
- Runners-up: Boherlahan

The 1914 Tipperary Senior Hurling Championship was the 25th staging of the Tipperary Senior Hurling Championship since its establishment by the Tipperary County Board in 1887.

Toomevara were the defending champions.

Toomevara won the championship after a 5–02 to 3–01 defeat of Boherlahan in the final. It was their fifth championship title overall and their third title in succession.
