= Michael Leahy =

Michael Leahy may refer to:

- Michael Leahy (author) (born 1953), American writer
- Michael Leahy (politician) (1932–2007), Irish politician
- Michael P. T. Leahy (1934–2007), English philosopher
- Michael Leahy (trade unionist) (born 1949), General Secretary of the British Trade Union Community
- Mick Leahy (explorer) (1901–1979), Australian explorer
- Mick Leahy (boxer) (1935–2010), Irish/British boxer
- Mick Leahy (hurler) (1886–1950), Irish hurler
- Mike Leahy (born 1966), British virologist and TV presenter
- Mick Leahy (footballer), Irish footballer
- Mick Leahy (rugby union) (1935–2023), Irish rugby union player
