= Tommy Ryan (Boherlahan–Dualla hurler) =

Irish hurler

Tommy Ryan was an Irish sportsperson. He played hurling with his local club Boherlahan–Dualla and with the Tipperary senior inter-county team in the 1890s. He won four All-Ireland hurling senior titles with Tipperary.
