= 1916 All-Ireland Senior Hurling Championship final =

1916 All-Ireland Senior Hurling Final
- Event: 1916 All-Ireland Senior Hurling Championship
Tipperary	Kilkenny
5-4	3-2
- Date: 21 January 1917
- Venue: Croke Park, Dublin
- Referee: Willie Walsh (Waterford)
- Attendance: 5,000

The 1916 All-Ireland Senior Hurling Championship Final was the 29th All-Ireland Final and the culmination of the 1916 All-Ireland Senior Hurling Championship, an inter-county hurling tournament for the top teams in Ireland. The match was held at Croke Park, Dublin, on 21 January 1917 between Kilkenny, represented by club side Tullaroan, and Tipperary, represented by club side Boherlahan. The Leinster champions lost to their Munster opponents on a score line of 5–4 to 3–2.

== Match details ==
1917-01-21

Tipperary	5-4 – 3-2	Kilkenny

Croke Park, Dublin
Attendance: 5,000
Referee: W. Walsh (Waterford)
