= Pat Power (hurler) =

Irish hurler

Personal information
- Born: 1959 (age 66–67) Boherlahan, County Tipperary, Ireland
- Occupation: Education consultant

Sport
- Sport: Hurling
- Position: Full-forward
Club
- Years: Club
- Boherlahan–Dualla
Club titles
- Tipperary titles: 0
College
- Years: College
- University College Dublin
College titles
- Fitzgibbon titles: 0
Inter-county*
Years	County	Apps (scores)
1982-1985	Tipperary	1 (0-00)
Inter-county titles
- Munster titles: 0
- All-Irelands: 0
- NHL: 0
- All Stars: 0
- *Inter County team apps and scores correct as of 23:54, 27 August 2021.

Patrick Power (born 1959) is an Irish former hurler. At club level he played with Boherlahan-Dualla and was also a member of the Tipperary senior hurling team. He usually lined out as a forward.

== Career ==
Power first played juvenile and underage hurling with the Boherlahan–Dualla club before joining the club's senior team. He first appeared on the inter-county scene with the Tipperary minor team that won the All-Ireland Minor Championship in 1976. Power progressed onto the Tipperary under-21 team and won back-to-back All-Ireland Under-21 Championship titles in 1979 and 1980. He subsequently made a number of league and championship appearances with the Tipperary senior hurling team during the 1980s.

== Honours ==
Tipperary

- All-Ireland Under-21 Hurling Championship: 1979, 1980
- Munster Under-21 Hurling Championship: 1979, 1980
- All-Ireland Minor Hurling Championship: 1976
- Munster Minor Hurling Championship: 1976
