= Three Ages =

1923 film

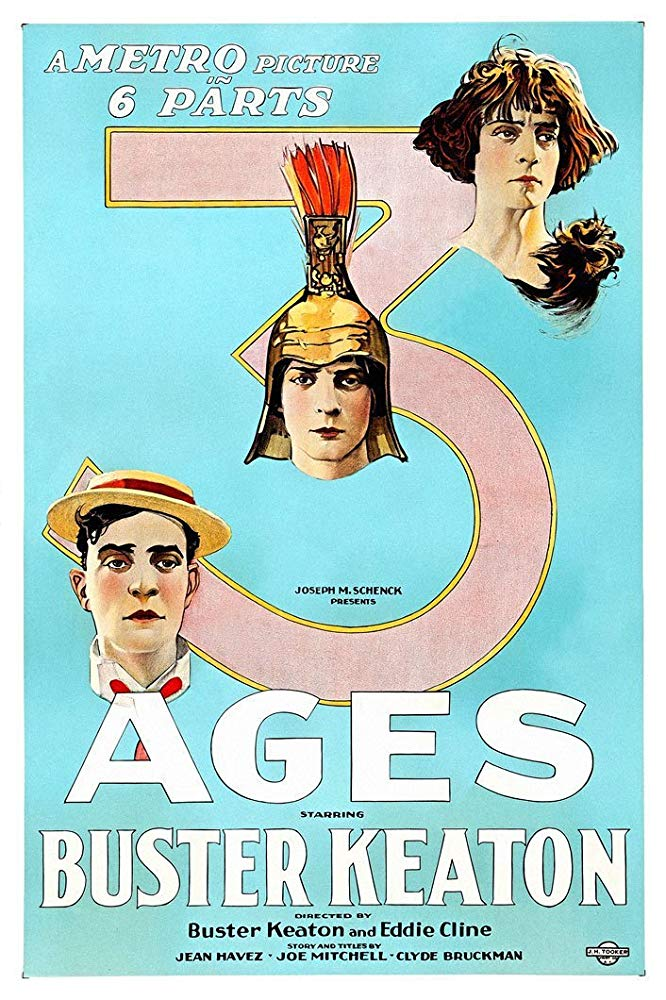
- Theatrical poster
- Directed by: Buster Keaton; Edward F. Cline
- Written by: Clyde Bruckman; Jean C. Havez; Joseph Mitchell; Buster Keaton (uncredited)
- Produced by: Joseph M. Schenck (uncredited); Buster Keaton (uncredited)
- Starring: Buster Keaton; Margaret Leahy; Wallace Beery; Lillian Lawrence; Joe Roberts
- Cinematography: Elgin Lessley; William C. McGann
- Production company: Buster Keaton Productions
- Distributed by: Metro Pictures
- Release date: September 24, 1923
- Running time: 1:04:00
- Country: United States
- Languages: Silent film English intertitles

The full film

Three Ages is a 1923 black-and-white American feature-length silent comedy film starring comedian Buster Keaton and Wallace Beery. The first feature Keaton wrote, directed, produced, and starred in (unlike The Saphead, in which he only acted), Keaton structured the film like three inter-cut short films. While Keaton was a proven success in the short film medium, he had yet to prove himself as a feature-length star. It has been alleged that, had the project flopped, the film would have been broken into three short films, although this has been disputed by film historians who note that neither Keaton nor his associates made this claim in their lifetimes. The structure also worked as a parody of D. W. Griffith's 1916 film Intolerance.

== Plot ==
Three plots in three different historical periods — prehistoric times, ancient Rome, and the Roaring Twenties — are intercut to prove the point that man's love for woman has not significantly changed throughout history. In all three plots, "The Boy", played by the small and slight Buster Keaton and "The Villain", Wallace Beery, compete for the attention of "The Girl", played by Margaret Leahy. Each plot follows similar "arcs" in the storyline in which the Boy works for his beloved's attention and eventually wins her over.

=== Stone age ===
In the Stone Age, the Boy competes with the bigger, brutish Villain for a cavewoman, the Girl. After observing another caveman drag away a woman by the hair in order to "claim" her, Keaton tries to become more assertive, but is continuously pushed back and bullied by the Villain. An attempt to make the Girl jealous by flirting with another woman ends in failure. Nevertheless, Keaton grows closer to the Girl, and the Villain challenges him to a fight at sunrise.

The Boy wins the fight, thanks to hiding a rock in his club However, he is caught and tied to the tail of an elephant, to be dragged around the dirt as punishment. Upon his return, he finds the Villain is about to claim the Girl. The Boy attempts to take off with her. The Villain catches him and the two battle by tossing boulders at each other from afar, with the Boy and the Girl standing on a cliff together. When the Villain climbs up the cliff to reclaim the Girl, the Boy dispatches his cronies and finally defeats him. He drags a smitten the Girl off by the hair. In the epilogue, they go off for a walk with their huge family of children following them.

=== Ancient Rome ===
In the Ancient Rome segment, the Boy attempts to attract the attention of the wealthy Girl, but is continually pushed back by the Villain. The Villain challenges him to a chariot race after a hard snow — the Boy wins by using sled dogs instead of horses. In revenge, the Villain forces him into the lion pit belonging to the Girl's family. The Boy survives by befriending the lion and manicuring its claws.

The Boy is rescued from the lion pit by the Girl's parents while the Villain kidnaps the Girl. The Boy rescues her and tries to seduce her in her palanquin, which takes off without them. In the epilogue, they also go out for a walk with many children in tow.

=== 1920s ===
In "modern times," the Boy is a poor man yearning for the Girl, who has rich parents. The Girl's mother, unimpressed with the Boy's bank account but interested in the Villain's, decides on the Villain as a match for her daughter. The Boy accidentally gets drunk at a restaurant where the Villain and the Girl are dining. The Villain tricks another man into punching the Boy, who stumbles home drunk. Later, the Boy impresses the Girl by playing in a football game; although the Villain is a coach, the Villain decides to play opposite the Boy. The Boy is overwhelmed by the bigger Villain, but ends up winning the game with an impressive touchdown.

An irritated the Villain frames the Boy for possession of alcohol and gets him arrested, simultaneously showing him a wedding announcement between him and the Girl — the Boy will be unable to stop the wedding while in jail. While shadowed by a guard, the Boy finds a criminal file showing that the Villain has been charged with bigamy and forgery. He attempts to call the Girl to warn her. He accidentally escapes when the phone booth he is using is taken out for replacement. the Boy evades the police chasing him and makes it to the church in time to drag the Girl away from the wedding and into a cab. After showing her the Villain's criminal file, he takes the Girl home and prepares to leave, but she kisses him. He declares to the cab driver that they are going back to the church. In the epilogue, they also go out for a walk — this time with their dog instead of children.

== Cast ==
- Buster Keaton as The Boy
- Margaret Leahy as The Girl
- Wallace Beery as The Villain
- Joe Roberts as The Girl's Father
- Lillian Lawrence as The Girl's Mother
- Kewpie Morgan as The Emperor / Roman Thug / Cave Man (as Horace Morgan)

== Reception ==
In his October 1923 Life magazine review, Robert E. Sherwood wrote, "Although one has considerable difficulty in following the weird meanderings of Buster's plot (if any), one has no trouble whatsoever in greeting his antics with a hearty laugh. Of the three ages, the cave-man part is easily the most comic."

The December 1923 issue of Photoplay said of the film, "It has its good spots, but is below Buster's standard."

More recently, Dennis Schwartz felt that "Though overloaded with too much of a narrative for a Keaton comedy, some flashes of the Keaton genius occurs [sic]."

== Preservation status ==
A caption at the beginning of the Rohauer Collection print of the film states that when the film's negative was rediscovered in 1954, it was so badly decomposed as to be considered unsalvageable. Subsequent restoration work preserved the film for posterity, although a good deal of damage is still evident.

== See also ==
- Buster Keaton filmography
- Anachronism
- Caveman
