= Flor Coffey =

Irish hurler

Personal information
- Native name: Flaithrí Ó Cofaigh (Irish)
- Born: 10 June 1920 Boherlahen, County Tipperary, Ireland
- Died: 25 April 2014 (aged 93) Thurles, County Tipperary, Ireland
- Occupation: Weighmaster
- Height: 5 ft 11 in (180 cm)

Sport
- Sport: Hurling
- Position: Centre-back
Clubs
- Years: Club
- Boherlahan–Dualla; Thurles Sarsfields
Club titles
- Tipperary titles: 2
Inter-county
- Years: County
- 1943-1953: Tipperary
Inter-county titles
- Munster titles: 1
- All-Irelands: 2
- NHL: 1

Florence Coffey (10 June 1920 – 25 April 2014) was an Irish hurler who played as a centre-back for the Tipperary senior team.

Born in Boherlahen, County Tipperary, Coffey first arrived on the inter-county scene at the age of seventeen when he first linked up with the Tipperary minor team before later joining the junior side. He made his senior debut during the 1943 championship. Coffey immediately became a regular member of the team and won two All-Ireland medals, one Munster medal and one National Hurling League medal.

As a member of the Munster inter-provincial team on a number of occasions, Coffey won one Railway Cup medal as a non-playing substitute. At club level he was a two-time Connacht medallist, firstly with Boherlahan–Dualla and later with Thurles Sarsfields.

Coffey retired from inter-county hurling following the conclusion of the 1953 championship.

== Honours ==
=== Player ===
Boherlahan–Dualla

- Tipperary Senior Hurling Championship (1): 1941

Thurles Sarsfields

- Tipperary Senior Hurling Championship (1): 1952

Tipperary

- All-Ireland Senior Hurling Championship (2): 1945, 1949
- Munster Senior Hurling Championship (1): 1945
- National Hurling League (1): 1948-49

Munster

- Railway Cup (1): 1946 (sub)
