= Jimmy Maher (hurler) =

Irish hurler

Jimmy Maher was an Irish sportsperson. He played hurling with his local club Boherlahan and was a member of the Tipperary senior inter-county team in the 1940s. Maher won two Munster winners' medals with Tipp in 1941 and 1945, as well as a single All-Ireland winners' medal in 1945.
