= 1930 Tipperary Senior Hurling Championship =

Annual hurling competition season

- Champions: Toomevara (8th title)
- Runners-up: Boherlahan

The 1930 Tipperary Senior Hurling Championship was the 39th staging of the Tipperary Senior Hurling Championship since its establishment by the Tipperary County Board in 1887.

Thurles Sarsfields were the defending champions.

Toomevara won the championship after a 4–01 to 1–00 defeat of Boherlahan in the final. It was their eighth championship title overall and their first title since 1923.

== Results ==
=== Semi-finals ===
24 August 1930 Semi-final	Toomevara	6-03 - 2-00	Clonoulty	Borrisoleigh Grounds

21 September 1930 Semi-final	Boherlahan	3-03 - 2-03	Thurles Sarsfields	Holycross Grounds

=== Final ===
7 December 1930 Final	Toomevara	4-01 - 1-00	Boherlahan	MacDonagh Park
