= Tom Kevin =

Irish hurler

Personal information
- Native name: Tomás Ó Caoimhín (Irish)
- Born: 1927 Boherlahen, County Tipperary, Ireland
- Died: 19 October 2009 (aged 82) Boherlahen, County Tipperary, Ireland

Sport
- Sport: Hurling
Club
- Years: Club
- Boherlahan–Dualla
Club titles
- Tipperary titles: 0
Inter-county*
| Years | County | Apps (scores) |
| 1951 | Tipperary | 0 (0-00) |
Inter-county titles
- Munster titles: 0
- All-Irelands: 0
- NHL: 0
- *Inter County team apps and scores correct as of 00:53, 31 March 2015.

Thomas Kevin (1927 – 19 October 2009) was an Irish hurler who played for the Tipperary senior team.

Born in Boherlahen, County Tipperary, Kevin first arrived on the inter-county scene at the age of seventeen when he first linked up with the Tipperary minor team before later joining the junior side. He joined the senior panel during the 1951 championship. Kevin was a member of the team for just one year, however, during that time he won one All-Ireland medal and one Munster medal as a non-playing substitute.

At club level Kevin enjoyed a lengthy career with Boherlahan–Dualla.

Kevin retired from inter-county hurling following the conclusion of the 1951 championship.

In retirement from playing Kevin became involved in team management and coaching. He was a selector with the Boherlahen-Dualla senior team on a number of occasions.

== Honours ==
=== Player ===
Boherlahan–Dualla

- Mid Tipperary Senior Hurling Championship (1): 1953 (c)

Tipperary

- All-Ireland Senior Hurling Championship (1): 1951 (sub)
- Munster Senior Hurling Championship (1): 1951 (sub)
