= 1931 Tipperary Senior Hurling Championship =

Annual hurling competition season

- Teams: 4
- Champions: Toomevara (9th title)
- Runners-up: Moycarkey-Borris

Tournament statistics
- Matches played: 3
- Goals scored: 19 (6.33 per match)
- Points scored: 10 (3.33 per match)

The 1931 Tipperary Senior Hurling Championship was the 40th staging of the Tipperary Senior Hurling Championship since its establishment by the Tipperary County Board in 1887.

Toomevara were the defending champions.

Toomevara won the championship after a 5–04 to 2–00 defeat of Moycarkey-Borris in the final. It was their ninth championship title overall and their second title in succession.

== Results ==
=== Semi-finals ===
2 August 1931 Semi-final	Moycarkey–Borris	7-04 - 2-01	Clonoulty	Thurles Sportsfield

13 December 1931 Semi-final	Toomevara	2-01 - 1-00	Killenaule	Thurles Sportsfield

=== Final ===
14 February 1932 Final	Toomevara	5-04 - 2-00	Moycarkey–Borris	Thurles Sportsfield
