= Margaret Leahy =

English actress

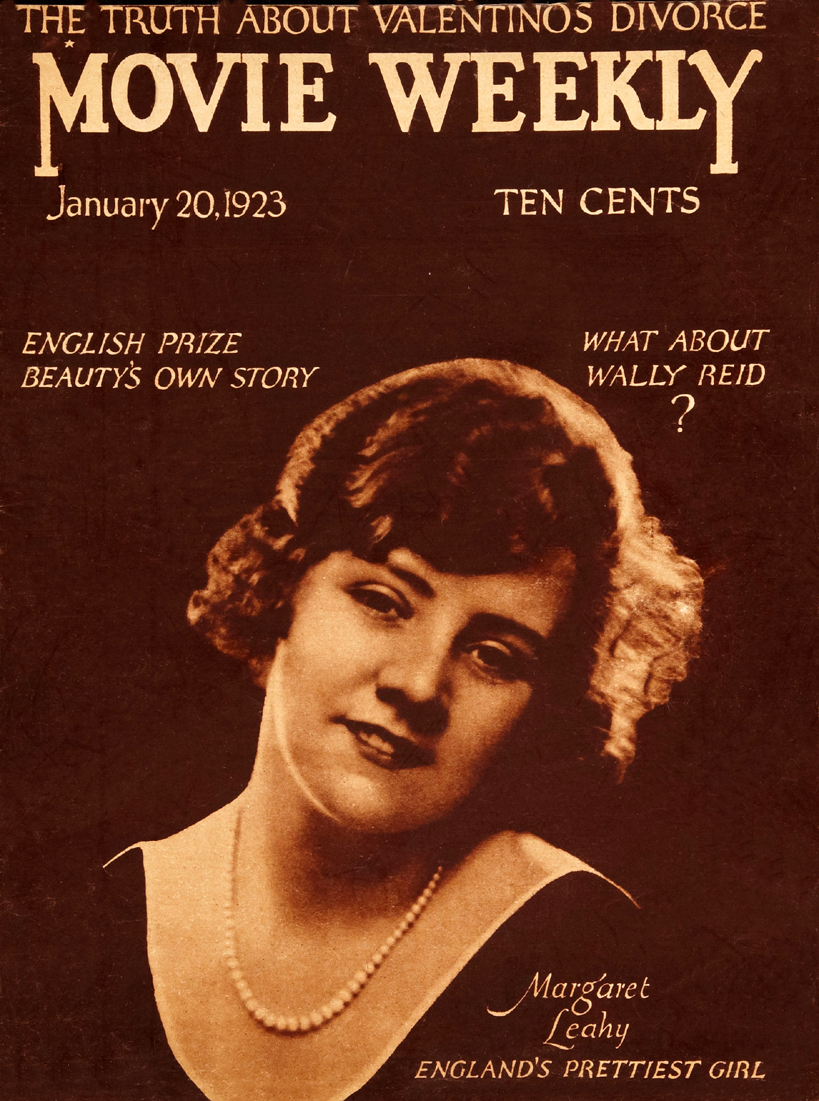
- Leahy in 1923
- Born: 17 August 1902; Bermondsey, London, United Kingdom of Great Britain and Ireland
- Died: 17 February 1967 (aged 64); Los Angeles, California, United States
- Other name: Margaret Leahy Vogt
- Citizenship: British (1902–1967); American (1927–1967)
- Occupations: Actress; interior designer
- Years active: 1923
- Notable work: Three Ages, 1923
- Spouse: Ernest Victor Vogt (m. 1924; div. 1935)

Margaret Leahy (1902–1967) was a British silent film actress and interior designer.

== Early life ==
Margaret Leahy was born on 17 August 1902 in Bermondsey, to William Leahy and Margaret Leahy.

== Career ==
In 1922, sisters Constance Talmadge and Norma Talmadge, Joseph Schenck and film director Edward Jose held a contest in England to find a new leading lady. The contestants reputedly numbered nearly 80,000, and the competition resulted in three girls thought suitable: Leahy, Katherine Campbell, and Agnès Souret who proceeded to travel to Hollywood at the end of 1922.

Born in London, Leahy was described by Norma Talmadge as "the most ravishing girl in England". Although it was said by her publicity that the young beauty queen had acted in English and French films in Europe, this proved to be untrue, especially after director Frank Lloyd had her dismissed from Within the Law (1923), which was supposed to be Leahy's big film debut, claiming that the actress could do nothing that an actress was supposed to do.

Leahy was selected as one of 13 WAMPAS Baby Stars in 1923, probably due to the help of producer Joseph Schenck, Norma Talmadge's husband, who had signed a three-year contract with the girl. Following this, Schenck handed Margaret over to his brother-in-law Buster Keaton to appear in his next comedy as Schenck believed it did not take much for an actress to be a comedian.

Leahy's only film, Three Ages (1923), directed by Buster Keaton, did absolutely nothing to improve her already crumbling film career. Leahy's role was not given much attention, and she never acted again. Following this one film, Leahy remained in California and got married instead of returning to England. She later became an interior decorator. She apparently committed suicide in Los Angeles at age 64.

== Filmography ==
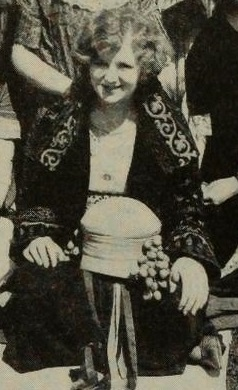
Leahy in WAMPAS Baby Stars in 1923

Year	Title	Role	Notes	Ref(s)
1923	Three Ages	The girl	Only role	

== Personal life ==
On the 24 June 1924, Leahy married Ernest Vogt (1892–1975), the owner of a riding school. Leahy and Vogt later divorced on the 12 March 1935.

Leahy became a naturalised U.S. citizen in September 1927. At the time of Leahy's naturalisation her occupation was listed as housewife.
