= 1920 All-Ireland Senior Hurling Championship final =

1920 All-Ireland Senior Hurling Final
- Event: 1920 All-Ireland Senior Hurling Championship
Dublin	Cork
4-9	4-3
- Date: 14 May 1922
- Venue: Croke Park, Dublin
- Referee: T. McGrath (Clare)
- Attendance: 22,000

The 1920 All-Ireland Senior Hurling Championship Final was the 33rd All-Ireland Final and the culmination of the 1920 All-Ireland Senior Hurling Championship, an inter-county hurling tournament for the top teams in Ireland. The match was held at Croke Park, Dublin, on 2 May 1922, between Cork, represented by a selection of club players, and Dublin, represented by club side Faughs. The Munster champions lost to their Leinster opponents on a score line of 4–9 to 4–3.

== Match details ==
1922-05-22

Dublin	4-9 – 4-3	Cork

Croke Park, Dublin
Attendance: 22,000
Referee: T. McGrath (Clare)

Dublin	Cork
