= Leahey =

Leahey is a surname. Notable people with the surname include:

- Harry Leahey (born 1935), jazz guitarist and guitar teacher who lived, taught and performed primarily in New Jersey
- Kanoa Leahey, Hawaiian Sportscaster/Sports Director for the KHON-TV Honolulu Fox Affiliate
- Mimi Leahey, American television soap opera script writer
- Patrick Joseph Leahy, Democratic senator for Vermont, USA
