= Patrick Leahy (doctor) =

Irish doctor and social campaigner (1917-1998)

- Leahy speaking at a public event in 1980
- Born: 13 March 1917; Thurles, County Tipperary, Ireland
- Died: 17 December 1998 (aged 81); Ireland
- Education: Royal College of Surgeons
- Occupation: General practitioner
- Years active: 1944–1998
- Known for: Campaigning for access to contraception; advocacy for euthanasia
- Medical career
- Institutions: Municipal General Hospital, Coventry; Lake Hospital, Ashton under Lyne; Ballyfermot Health Centre, Dublin
- Sub-specialties: General practice; obstetrics
- Awards: McNaughton Jones gold medal in midwifery and obstetrics (RCSI)

Patrick Joseph Leahy (13 March 1917 – 17 December 1998) was an Irish general practitioner and social campaigner, best known for his outspoken advocacy on contraception and euthanasia at a time when both were legally and socially contentious in Ireland. Born in Thurles, County Tipperary, he graduated from the Royal College of Surgeons in Ireland in 1944 with first-class honours and spent his early career in wartime Britain before returning to Ireland in 1964 to serve as district medical officer at Ballyfermot Health Centre in Dublin, where he worked until 1988. A humanist influenced by the writings of Bertrand Russell and Robert Green Ingersoll, he became one of the most vocal medical critics of the Health (Family Planning) Act 1979, openly defying the law by prescribing contraceptives to all patients he judged to need them and challenging the authorities to prosecute him. In 1995, he publicly disclosed that he had assisted at least fifty patients to die over the course of his career, in both Ireland and wartime England, prompting complaints to the Gardaí and the Irish Medical Council, neither of which ever brought proceedings against him. Following a recurrence of bladder cancer in 1997, he announced his intention to travel to Thailand to end his own life. However, he was asked to leave the country by the Thai medical council and returned to Ireland, where he died in December 1998 at the age of 81.

== Early life ==
Patrick Joseph Leahy was born on 13 March 1917 at the Mall, Thurles, County Tipperary, the son of William Leahy, an architect and engineer, and Margaret Leahy (née Doyle). One of eight children, he grew up in comfortable circumstances. His father introduced him at a young age to the writings of the humanist philosopher Bertrand Russell, an influence that would shape his outlook throughout his life. He was educated at CBS Thurles and Mount St Joseph's in Roscrea before entering the Royal College of Surgeons in Ireland (RCSI), where he graduated with first-class honours in 1944, winning the McNaughton Jones gold medal in midwifery and obstetrics and finishing first in his year.

== Wartime Britain and Early Career ==
Shortly after graduating, Leahy travelled to wartime Britain, where he took up a residency at the Municipal General Hospital in Coventry (1944-1948), followed by a post as resident obstetrical officer at Lake Hospital, Ashton under Lyne (1949-1963). It was during this period, he later said, that he first assisted patients to die, describing encounters with people who were suffering gravely from bomb injuries.

== Contraception activism ==
From 1964, Leahy served as district medical officer at Ballyfermot Health Centre in Dublin, a role he held until 1988. He described the experience as humbling and said it gave him a practical sense of the consequences of restricted access to contraception for working-class families. He became one of the more outspoken medical voices in Ireland on the matter, prescribing contraceptives to his patients at a time when the practice existed in a legal grey area.

When Charles Haughey's Health (Family Planning) Act was passed in 1979, limiting the provision of contraceptives to those with a prescription and for defined purposes, Leahy was among its most vocal critics. At a public meeting at Trinity College Dublin in November 1980, he described the legislation as "one of the most terrible pieces of restrictive legislation" and stated plainly that he would continue to prescribe contraceptives to all patients he judged to need them. Among his patients at Ballyfermot was Margaret Farrelly, a mother of fourteen who, on his advice, began using the contraceptive pill.

In February 1981, Leahy publicly declared on RTÉ that he was breaking the law, directly challenging then-Minister for Health Michael Woods to respond. He subsequently received four visits from gardaí. On the first three occasions, he verbally admitted his actions; when told a verbal confession was insufficient, he wrote one out and handed it to the detective present. No prosecution followed. He was one of 220 doctors who signed a letter to the Minister for Health that year, stating their intention to supply contraceptives without the conditions set out in the Act. The letter was ignored by the authorities.

== Euthanasia activism ==
Leahy's attention turned increasingly to euthanasia in his later years. In March 1995, he publicly revealed that he had helped a friend die by administering a lethal injection, stating that he had assisted patients to die over a long period, both in Ireland and during his time in wartime England. He said he regularly received requests from terminally ill people seeking such help, and that he had acted on many of them. The disclosure prompted complaints to both the gardaí and the Irish Medical Council. Leahy himself demanded to be called before the Medical Council's fitness to practise committee. No civil or criminal proceedings were ever taken against him.

He described his approach to assisted dying in straightforward personal terms. When asked about the legal and theological dimensions, he said the question was simply whether he, as an individual, was capable of walking away from a person in suffering. He believed the matter should be left to the common sense of doctors and their patients rather than governed by legislation. He had been influenced throughout his career by the writings of Bertrand Russell and the American orator Robert Green Ingersoll. Friends of Leahy's who shared his humanist outlook included Noël Browne and Michael D. Higgins. By his own account, Leahy had been directly involved in at least fifty cases of euthanasia and had referred many others to doctors willing to assist. He claimed there was at least one such doctor in every county in Ireland.

In late 1997, Leahy was diagnosed with a recurrence of bladder cancer, which had been operated on previously. He announced, during a live studio discussion on RTÉ Radio One with Vincent Browne, that he intended to travel to Thailand (a country he had visited regularly for more than twenty years and regarded as a second home) and end his own life there in January 1998. Before departing, he gave an extensive interview to the Irish Times and also recorded a separate interview for RTÉ. "My life is mine," he told the Irish Times. "It doesn't belong to Bertie Ahern or any theologian or anybody else, and dying is part of your living". The announcement attracted wide media coverage. On his arrival in Thailand, the Thai medical council requested that he leave the country, and he returned to Ireland. He died on 17 December 1998, aged 81.

== Legacy ==
In Seanad Éireann, Leahy's death was noted by Senators Joe O'Toole and David Norris, who paid tribute to his moral courage and his contribution to social reform in Ireland. O'Toole described him as "a catalyst to extraordinary debate and emotion" and said he had "made us face our demons and confront taboos".
