= Pat Leahy (Australian footballer) =

Australian rules footballer

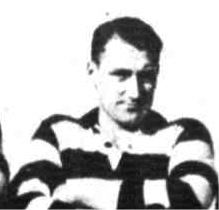

Personal information
- Full name: Patrick Joseph Leahy
- Born: 2 September 1917; Colac, Victoria
- Died: 27 November 2009 (aged 92); Brisbane, Queensland
- Original team: Cororooke
- Height: 183 cm (6 ft 0 in)
- Weight: 86 kg (190 lb)

Playing career^{1}
Years	Club	Games (Goals)
1939	Geelong	5 (0)
1943	South Melbourne	11 (14)
1944	Geelong	15 (9)
1945	South Melbourne	1 (0)
Total		32 (23)
- ^{1} Playing statistics correct to the end of 1945.

Patrick Joseph Leahy (2 September 1917 – 27 November 2009) was an Australian rules footballer who played with Geelong and South Melbourne in the Victorian Football League (VFL). Leahy is one of only two players in league history to switch from the same clubs on three occasions, as he started his career at Geelong, went to South Melbourne, returned to Geelong, then finished up back at South Melbourne.

== Career ==
Leahy, a ruckman from Cororooke, was first noticed by Footscray, which found him employment in Melbourne. Geelong however had a residential claim to him and it was with that club that he made five appearances in the 1939 VFL season. His performances that season were good enough for many to brand him as a future big name player.

For personal reasons, Leahy didn't remain at Geelong in 1940 and over the next two years was approached by officials from Carlton, Essendon, Footscray and Richmond, but none were able to secure his services. Leahy, who Geelong had regarded highly enough to call him "a second Jack Dyer", was signed by South Melbourne in 1942, on loan from Geelong, which were sitting out of the competition due to the war. He was unable to play for South Melbourne at that time as the hours he worked at a munitions factory wouldn't allow for training, but he appeared in 11 games for the club in 1943.

When Geelong returned to the league in 1944, South Melbourne were forced to return Leahy to Geelong, although he was reluctant to play for the club again, due to past differences and the fact that he had just bought a house in Kew. An agreement was reached that Leahy could train in Footscray, so he spent the 1944 season with Geelong and played 15 league games.

He managed to get a clearance back to South Melbourne in 1945 and made his return in round seven, against Fitzroy. A knee injury sustained in that game cost him a spot in the team and he was unable to get back in.

== Personal life ==
Leahy later moved to Queensland and was living in Wynnum when he died on 27 November 2009. Before his death he was the last living Geelong player to have appeared at Corio Oval.
