= Leakey =

Leakey may refer to:

- Leakey, Texas, U.S., a city
- Leakey (crater), a lunar impact crater
- Leakey (surname)
- 7958 Leakey, an asteroid
- Leakey Independent School District, a public school district based in Leakey, Texas

== See also ==
- Leak (disambiguation)
