= 1914 All-Ireland Junior Hurling Championship =

All Ireland Champions
- Winners: Clare (1st win)
- Captain: Dan Minogue

All Ireland Runners-up
- Runners-up: Laois

Provincial Champions
- Munster: Clare
- Leinster: Laois
- Ulster: Not Played
- Connacht: Not Played

The 1914 All-Ireland Junior Hurling Championship was the third staging of the All-Ireland Junior Championship since its establishment by the Gaelic Athletic Association in 1912.

Tipperary entered the championship as the defending champions.

The All-Ireland final was played on 18 October 1914 at Croke Park in Dublin, between Clare and Laois, in what was their first ever championship meeting. Clare won the match by 6–05 to 1–01 to claim their first championship title.

== Results ==
=== All-Ireland Junior Hurling Championship ===
==== All-Ireland final ====
18 October 1914 Final	Clare	2-02 - 0-00	Laois	Croke Park
