= Kevin Leahy =

Kevin Leahy may refer to:

- Kevin Leahy (archaeologist)
- Kevin Leahy (Gaelic footballer), Gaelic football player for the Ballymun Kickhams
- Kevin Leahy (general), commander of US Army Central
- Kevin Leahy (musician) (born 1974), backing musician
- Kevin Leahy (politician), member of the Western Australian Legislative Council
- Kevin Leahy, translator for the English Vampire Hunter D novel series
