= 1913 Tipperary Senior Hurling Championship =

Annual hurling competition season

- Champions: Toomevara (4th title)
- Runners-up: Cashel

The 1913 Tipperary Senior Hurling Championship was the 24th staging of the Tipperary Senior Hurling Championship since its establishment by the Tipperary County Board in 1887.

Toomevara were the defending champions.

Toomevara won the championship after a 2–03 to 0–00 defeat of Cashel in the final. It was their fourth championship title overall and their second title in succession.
