= 1894 All-Ireland Senior Hurling Championship final =

1894 All-Ireland Senior Hurling Final
- Event: 1894 All-Ireland Senior Hurling Championship
Cork	Dublin
5-20	2-0
- Date: 24 March 1895
- Venue: Clonturk Park, Dublin
- Referee: J. J. Kenny (Dublin)
- Attendance: 2,000
- Weather: Wind, heavy rain

The 1894 All-Ireland Senior Hurling Championship Final was the 7th All-Ireland Final and the culmination of the 1894 All-Ireland Senior Hurling Championship, an inter-county hurling tournament for the top teams in Ireland. The match was held at Clonturk Park, Dublin, on 24 March 1895 between Cork, represented by club side Blackrock, and Dublin, represented by club side Rapparees. The Leinster champions lost to their Munster opponents on a score line of 5–20 to 2–0.

This victory gave Cork a third All-Ireland title in-a-row.

== Match details ==
1895-03-24

Cork	5-20 – 2-0	Dublin

Clonturk Park, Dublin
Attendance: 2,000
Referee: J. J. Kenny (Dublin)

Cork Team Stephen Hayes, Michael Murphy, John O'Leary, John Kidney, Dan Coughlan, S Hegarty, Pat Coughlan, Willie John O'Connell, Miah Norberg, John Cashman, Jim Young, David Hayes, Michael Cronin, Jack Cullinane, James Delea, John O'Connor, Jim Kelleher
