= Ogonnelloe =

Civil parish in County Clare, Ireland

Ogonnelloe Tuath Ó gConaíle
- Civil parish
- Location in Ireland
- Coordinates: 52°52′00″N 8°27′11″W
- Country: Ireland
- Province: Munster
- County: County Clare

Area
  - Civil parish: 40.07 km^{2} (15.47 sq mi)

Population (2006)
  - Rural: 605
- Time zone: UTC+0 (WET)
  - Summer (DST): UTC-1 (IST (WEST))
- Irish Grid Reference: R688818

Ogonnelloe (Irish: Tuath Ó gConaíle, meaning 'Land of the Connollys') is a civil parish in east County Clare, Ireland, situated on the R463 regional road between Scariff and Killaloe and in the surrounding hills. It forms part of the Catholic parish of the same name.

== Location ==
The parish is in the historical barony of Tulla. It is 9 kilometres (6 mi) north of Killaloe on the road to Scarriff. It lies on the south side of Scariff bay, which opens into Lough Derg. Most of the parish lies in a valley, with high hills in the background.

Townlands are Aughinish, Ballybran, Ballybroghan, Ballyheefy, Ballyhurly, Ballylaghnan, Ballynagleragh, Bealkelly (Eyre), Bealkelly (Purdon), Caher, Carrowcore, Carrowena, Carrowgar, Islandcosgry, Rahena Beg and Rahena More.

== Notable people ==
- Dr. Joseph Stuart (1904–1980), former President of the GAA (1958–1961)

== See also ==
- List of towns and villages in Ireland
