= Frank McGrath (hurler) =

Irish hurler and manager

Frank McGarth
Personal information
- Native name: Prionsias Mac Craith (Irish)
- Born: 16 October 1885 Nenagh, County Tipperary, Ireland
- Died: Unknown
- Occupation: Grocery shop assistant

Sport
- Sport: Hurling
Club
- Years: Club
- Nenagh Éire Óg
Inter-county
- Years: County
- 1913-1914: Tipperary
Inter-county titles
- Munster titles: 1
- All-Irelands: 0

Frank Cornelius McGrath (born 16 October 1885) was an Irish hurler and manager who played for the Tipperary senior team.

McGrath made his first appearance for the team during the 1913 championship and was a regular member of the starting fifteen for just two seasons until he left the panel after the 1914 championship. During that time he won one Munster medal. McGrath was an All-Ireland runner-up on one occasion.

At club level McGrath played with Nenagh Éire Óg.

In retirement from playing McGrath became involved in team management. He served as manager and selector for Tipperary's All-Ireland winning campaigns in 1925 and 1937.
