= Killaloe (parish) =

- Roman Catholic parish
- Location in Ireland
- Coordinates: 52°48′0″N 8°27′0″W
- Country: Ireland
- Province: Munster
- County: County Clare
- Time zone: UTC+0 (WET)
  - Summer (DST): UTC-1 (IST (WEST))

Killaloe is a parish in County Clare, Ireland, and part of the Scáth na Sionnaine grouping of parishes within the Roman Catholic Diocese of Killaloe.

As of 2021, the co-parish priest is James Grace.

The main church of the parish is the Church of St. Flannan in Killaloe, built in 1836-1838 on lands donated by the Church of Ireland bishop Stephen Sandes. The church replaced an earlier chapel. The church grounds contains the Oratory of St. Lua that was moved there because of the impending flooding of its original location Friars Island due to the Shannon hydroelectric scheme.

The second church of the parish is the Church of the Sacred Heart and St. Lua in Garranboy. This church was built in 1909, replacing a chapel built in 1812. The third church is the St. Thomas Church in Bridgetown. This church was built in 1832 and was nearly completely rebuilt during the renovations in 1970.

== Gallery ==
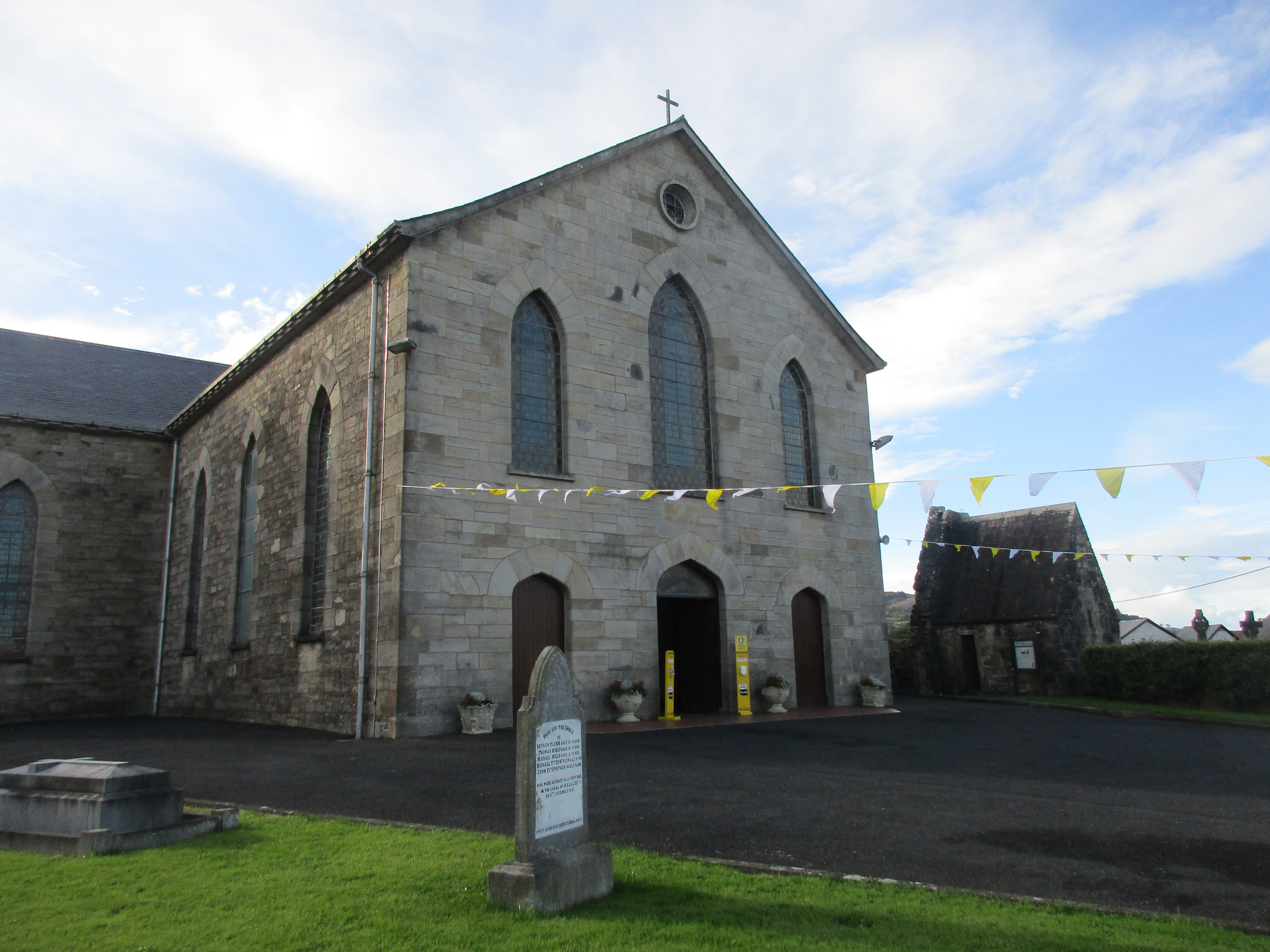
Church of St. Flannan

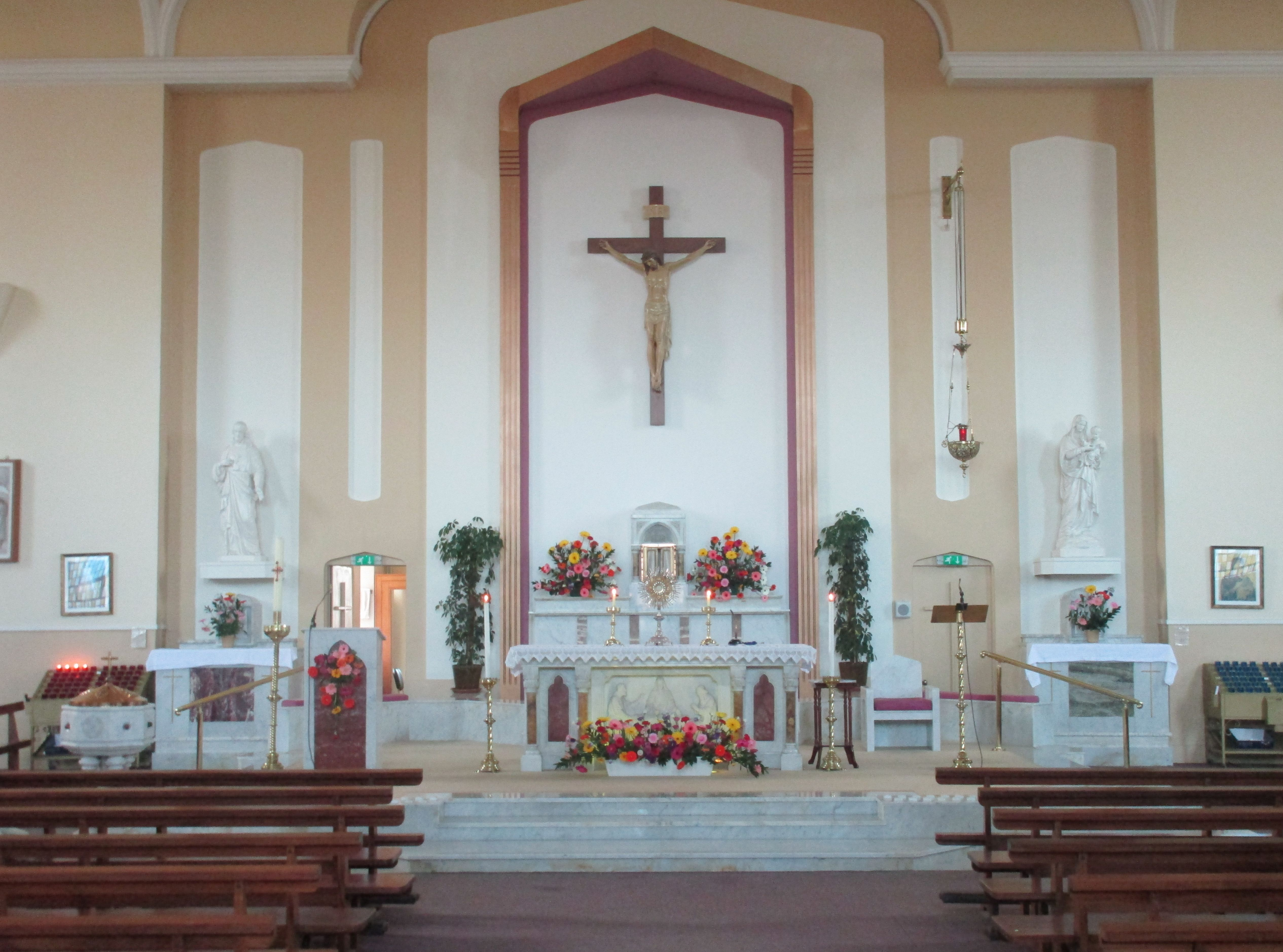
Altar of the Church of St. Flannan

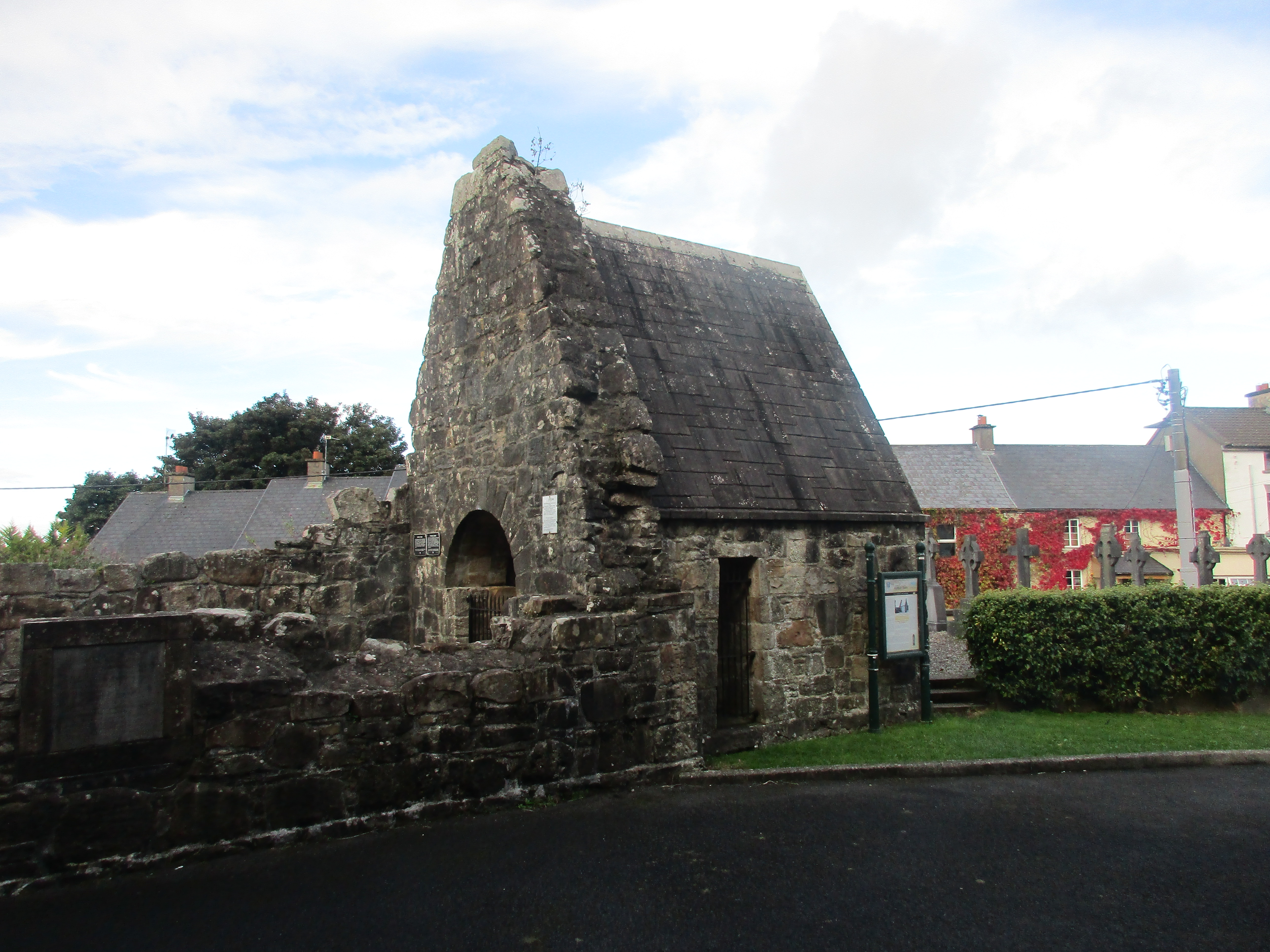
Oratory of St. Lua
