= 1917 All-Ireland Senior Hurling Championship =

Championship details
- Dates: 24 June 1917 – 28 October 1917
- Teams: 12

All-Ireland champions
- Winning team: Dublin (2nd win)
- Captain: John Ryan

All-Ireland Finalists
- Losing team: Tipperary
- Captain: Johnny Leahy

Provincial champions
- Munster: Tipperary
- Leinster: Dublin
- Ulster: Not Played
- Connacht: Not Played

Championship statistics
- No. matches played: 11
- Goals total: 87 (7.9 per game)
- Points total: 73 (6.6 per game)
- All-Star Team: See here

The 1917 All-Ireland Senior Hurling Championship was the 31st staging of the All-Ireland hurling championship since its establishment by the Gaelic Athletic Association in 1887. The championship began on 24 June 1917 and ended on 28 October 1917.

Tipperary were the defending champions, however, they were defeated on a 5–4 to 4–2 score line by Dublin in the All-Ireland final.

== Format ==
All-Ireland Championship

Final: (1 match) The winners of the Leinster and Munster championships contested this game. The winner was declared All-Ireland champions.

== Results ==
=== Leinster Senior Hurling Championship ===
| 24 June 1917 Quarter-final | Laois | 3–2 – 2–7 | Offaly | Ballybrophy |
| | | | | Referee: AC Harty |

| 24 June 1917 Quarter-final | Meath | 2–2 – 6–7 | Dublin | Dunboyne |
| | | | | Referee: J Collins |

| 12 August 1917 Semi-final | Dublin | 3–6 – 3–1 | Offaly | Ballybrophy |

| 12 August 1917 Semi-final | Wexford | 5–2 – 5–3 | Kilkenny | New Ross |
| | | | | Referee: H Boland |

| 9 September 1917 Final | Dublin | 5–1 – 4–0 | Kilkenny | Croke Park |
| | | | | Attendance: 4,000; Referee: P Brien |

=== Munster Senior Hurling Championship ===
| 8 July 1917 Quarter-final | Clare | 6–4 – 3–2 | Waterford | Markets Field |

| 8 July 1917 Semi-final | Limerick | 5–8 – 7–1 | Cork | Markets Field |

| 22 July 1917 Quarter-final | Tipperary | w/o – scr. | Kerry |

| 26 August 1917 Semi-final | Tipperary | 3–6 – 1–2 | Clare | Markets Field |

| 9 September 1917 Final | Tipperary | 3–4 – 3–4 | Limerick | Cork Athletic Grounds |

| 7 October 1917 Final replay | Tipperary | 6–4 – 3–1 | Limerick | Cork Athletic Grounds |

=== All-Ireland Senior Hurling Championship ===
| 28 October 1917 Final | Dublin | 5–4 – 4–2 | Tipperary | Croke Park |
| | | | | Attendance: 12,000; Referee: W Walsh |

== Championship statistics ==
=== Miscellaneous ===
- In the Munster semi-final between Tipperary and Clare, the Clare team walk off midway through the match after a dispute. As Tipperary were winning by a sizable margin at the time they were declared the winners.
- Dublin's defeat of Tipperary in the All-Ireland final is their first championship victory over the premier county. As of 2014 it remains their only championship victory over Tipperary. It was also Dublin's first All-Ireland win since 1889.

== Sources ==
- Corry, Eoghan, The GAA Book of Lists (Hodder Headline Ireland, 2005).
- Donegan, Des, The Complete Handbook of Gaelic Games (DBA Publications Limited, 2005).
