= 1919 All-Ireland Senior Hurling Championship =

Championship details
- Dates: 18 May – 21 September 1919
- Teams: 14

All-Ireland champions
- Winning team: Cork (7th win)
- Captain: Jimmy Kennedy

All-Ireland Finalists
- Losing team: Dublin
- Captain: Charlie Stuart

Provincial champions
- Munster: Cork
- Leinster: Dublin
- Ulster: Not Played
- Connacht: Not Played

Championship statistics
- No. matches played: 13
- Goals total: 82 (6.3 per game)
- Points total: 88 (6.7 per game)
- All-Star Team: See here

The 1919 All-Ireland Senior Hurling Championship was the 33rd staging of the All-Ireland Senior Hurling Championship, the Gaelic Athletic Association's premier inter-county hurling tournament. The championship ran from 18 May to 21 September 1919.

Limerick were the defending champions, however, they were beaten by Cork in the Munster final.

The All-Ireland final was played at Croke Park in Dublin on 21 September 1919 between Cork and Dublin, in what was their fourth championship meeting overall and a first meeting in the All-Ireland final in 25 years. Cork won the match by 6–04 to 2–04 to claim their seventh All-Ireland title overall and a first title in sixteen years.

== Teams ==
=== Team summaries ===
Team	Colours	Most recent success	
Team	Colours	All-Ireland	Provincial
Clare	Saffron and blue	1914	1914
Cork	Red and white	1903	1915
Dublin	Navy and blue	1917	1917
Galway	Maroon and white		1917
Kerry	Green and gold	1891	1891
Kilkenny	Black and amber	1914	1916
Laois	Blue and white	1915	1915
Limerick	Green and white	1918	1918
Louth	Red and white		
Meath	Green and gold		
Offaly	Green, white and gold		
Tipperary	Blue and gold	1916	1916
Waterford	Blue and white		
Wexford	Purple and gold	1910	1918

== Leinster Senior Hurling Championship ==
=== Leinster first round ===
22 June 1919 First round	Laois	2–02 – 4–01	Offaly	Ballybrophy Grounds
				Attendance: 2,000; Referee: P Kennefick

=== Leinster quarter-finals ===
25 May 1919 Quarter-final	Louth	1–02 – 4–02	Meath	Shamrock Lodge
				Attendance: 2,000

6 July 1919 Quarter-final	Dublin	2–05 – 0–03	Offaly	Portlaoise Grounds
				Referee: R O'Keeffe

=== Leinster semi-finals ===
6 July 1919 Semi-final	Wexford	0–00 – 7–05	Kilkenny	New Ross Grounds
				Referee: M de Búrca

20 July 1919 Semi-final	Dublin	8–08 – 5–04	Meath	Croke Park

=== Leinster final ===
10 August 1919 Final	Dublin	1–05 – 1–02	Kilkenny	Wexford Park
				Attendance: 4,500

== Munster Senior Hurling Championship ==
=== Munster quarter-finals ===
18 May 1919 Quarter-final	Waterford	3–00 – 10–01	Cork	Fraher Field

25 May 1919 Quarter-final	Tipperary	5–04 – 0–01	Kerry	Cork Athletic Grounds

=== Munster semi-finals ===
22 June 1919 Semi-final	Clare	4–01 – 6–06	Limerick	Ennis Grounds

29 June 1919 Semi-final	Cork	2–04 – 2–03	Tipperary	Cork Athletic Grounds

=== Munster final ===
24 August 1919 Final	Limerick	1–06 – 3–05	Cork	Markets Field
				Attendance: 15,000; Referee: W Walsh (Waterford)

== All-Ireland Senior Hurling Championship ==
=== All-Ireland semi-final ===
7 September 1919 Semi-final	Cork	3–08 – 0–02	Galway	Markets Field

=== All-Ireland final ===
21 September 1919 Final	Cork	6–04 – 2–04	Dublin	Croke Park
				Attendance: 20,000; Referee: W Walsh (Waterford)

== Sources ==
- Corry, Eoghan, The GAA Book of Lists (Hodder Headline Ireland, 2005).
- Donegan, Des, The Complete Handbook of Gaelic Games (DBA Publications Limited, 2005).
