= Mick Leahy (hurler) =

Irish hurler (1895–1950)

Personal information
- Native name: Mícheál Ó Laocha (Irish)
- Born: 1 March 1895 Boherlahan, County Tipperary, Ireland
- Died: 13 April 1950 (aged 55) Mallow, County Cork, Ireland
- Occupation: Business owner

Sport
- Sport: Hurling
- Position: Left corner-forward
Clubs
- Years: Club
- 1914–1916 1917–1919 1920–1925 1926 1927–1931: Boherlahan–Dualla; Thurles Sarsfield's; Blackrock; Boherlahan–Dualla; Blackrock
Inter-county
- Years: County
- 1916–1926 1927–1931: Tipperary; Cork
Inter-county titles
- Munster titles: 3
- All-Irelands: 1
- NHL: 0

Michael Leahy (1 March 1895 – 13 April 1950) was an Irish hurler who played as a left corner-forward for the Tipperary and Cork senior teams from 1916 until 1931.

Leahy joined the Tipperary team as a substitute during the 1916 championship and lined out at irregular intervals over the course of the following decade. In 1927 Leahy joined the Cork senior hurling team, remaining with 'the Rebels' until 1931. Throughout his long career he won one All-Ireland winner's medal and two Munster winner's medals.

At club level Hassett played with the Boherlahan–Dualla and Thurles Sarsfields in Tipperary and with Blackrock in Cork, winning numerous county club championship winners' medals.
