= Johnny Leahy =

Irish hurler (1891–1949)

Personal information
- Native name: Seán Ó Liathaigh (Irish)
- Nickname: Captain Johnny
- Born: 27 December 1891 Boherlahan, County Tipperary, Ireland
- Died: 19 November 1949 (aged 57) Boherlahan, County Tipperary, Ireland
- Occupation: Farmer

Sport
- Sport: Hurling
- Position: Midfield
Club
- Years: Club
- 1912–1930: Boherlahan
Club titles
- Tipperary titles: 9
Inter-county
- Years: County
- 1909–1928: Tipperary
Inter-county titles
- Munster titles: 5
- All-Irelands: 2
- NHL: 1

John Leahy (27 December 1891 – 19 November 1949) was an Irish hurler who played as a midfielder for the Tipperary senior team.

After joining the team for a tournament game in 1909, Leahy made his proper debut during the 1914 championship and was a regular member of the starting fifteen until his retirement after the 1928 championship. During that time he won two All-Ireland medals, five Munster Championship medals and one National League medal. An All-Ireland runner-up on two occasions, Leahy captained the team to the All-Ireland title in 1916 and 1925.

At club level Leahy was a nine-time county club championship medalist with Boherlahan–Dualla.

In retirement from playing Leahy became involved in the coaching and administrative affairs of the GAA. He served as chairman and secretary of the Tipperary County Board for lengthy periods, while he was also an All-Ireland-winning selector.

Leahy was the member of a hurling 'dynasty' in Tipperary. His younger brothers Paddy, Mick and Tommy were also All-Ireland medalists.

== Playing career ==
=== Club ===
Leahy played his club hurling with Boherlahan in a career that spanned almost twenty years.

Founded in 1912, the club went on to contest their first championship decider just two years later. A 5–2 to 3–1 defeat by Toomevara was the result on that occasion.

The following year Boherlahan were back in the county final once again. Thurles Sarsfields provided the opposition, however, a 4–4 to 1–2 victory gave Leahy his first Tipperary Senior Hurling Championship medal. It was the first of a four-in-a-row for the club as subsequent defeats of Toomevara in 1916, 1917 and 1918 gave Leahy further winners' medals.

Five-in-a-row proved beyond Boherlahan and political unrest led to the disbanding of the championship for two years.

In 1922 Boherlahan reached the county final once again. A 5–1 to 2–3 defeat of a north selection representing Toomevara gave Leahy a fifth championship medal.

Boherlahan surrendered their title the following year, however, Leahy lined out in yet another county final in 1924. An 8–3 to 1–0 defeat of a mid selection gave Leahy a sixth championship medal. A seventh medal followed in 1925 as Boherlahan defeated a Toomevara–Moneygall combination.

Leahy's side were denied a third successive championship by Moycarkey–Borris, however, back-to-back defeats of Clonoulty in 1927 and 1928 brought Leahy's championship medal tally to nine.

A defeat by old rivals Toomevara in a replay of the county final in 1930 brought the curtain down on Leahy's club hurling career.

=== Inter-county ===
Leahy first played for the Tipperary senior hurling team in a tournament game in 1909. It was 1914, however, before he made his championship debut.

Two years later Leahy was captain of the team as he played in his first Munster final. Cork provided the opposition on that occasion, however, Leahy collected his first Munster Senior Hurling Championship medal as Tipperary won by 5–0 to 1–2. Galway were beaten in the subsequent All-Ireland semi-final, resulting in a Tipperary-Kilkenny All-Ireland final. The game itself wasn't played until 21 January 1917. Tipperary fell behind by five points at half-time, however, the side fought back. Tipperary's Tommy Shanahan and Kilkenny's Dick Grace were both sent off. In spite of this Tipperary won the game by 5–4 to 3–2 giving Leahy his first All-Ireland medal.

1917 saw Tipperary draw with Limerick 3–4 apiece in the Munster final. In the replay Tipperary made no mistake and won comfortably, giving Leahy a second Munster. The absence of the All-Ireland semi-finals allowed Tipperary to advance directly to the championship decider where Dublin provided the opposition. Tipperary native Bob Mockler scored 1–2 from midfield as Dublin won the game by 5–4 to 4–2.

Tipperary went into decline for a number of year following this defeat, however, the team bounced back in 1922 with Leahy collecting a third Munster title as captain. Galway fell in the All-Ireland semi-final, setting up a championship decider with old rivals Kilkenny. Leahy's side were up by three points with three minutes to go, however, two quick Kilkenny goals resulted in a 4–2 to 2–6 victory for Kilkenny. It would be another forty-five years before they beat Tipperary in the championship again.

Tipperary surrendered their provincial crown to Limerick in 1923, however, Leahy won a fourth Munster medal as captain in 1924. Galway, the reigning All-Ireland champions, played against Tipperary in the subsequent All-Ireland semi-final. It was a close affair, however, Galway won by a single point.

In 1925 Leahy added a fifth and final Munster medal to his collection as Tipperary beat Waterford in the provincial final. Antrim were defeated by Tipperary in the penultimate game of the championship, setting up an All-Ireland final with Galway. Tipperary won the game by 5–6 to 1–5 giving Leahy his second All-Ireland medal as captain.

Three years later he had his final success with Tipperary. The team remained undefeated in the National Hurling League to capture the title. Leahy retired from inter-county hurling shortly afterwards.

=== Inter-provincial ===
Leahy also lined out with Munster in the inter-provincial hurling championship. He was a non-playing substitute in the inaugural year of the competition in 1927, however, Munster were defeated by Leinster in the final. Leahy lined out as a non-playing sub once again in 1928 and captured a Railway Cup medal as Leinster were accounted for.

== Post-playing career ==
In retirement from playing Leahy became involved in the administrative affairs of the GAA. He was a member of the Munster Council and also served as chairman and secretary of the Tipperary County Board.

In 1937 Leahy was appointed to the selection committee of the Tipperary senior hurling team. It was a successful year for Tipp as they won their first Munster title after a lapse of seven years. A 6–3 to 4–3 defeat of reigning All-Ireland champions Limerick secured the provincial crown. The subsequent All-Ireland final pitted Tipperary against Kilkenny. Tipperary easily defeated their near rivals by 3–11 to 0–3.

== Personal life ==
Leahy was born in Boherlahan, County Tipperary in the Golden Vale in 1890. He was educated at the local national school and later worked on the family farm. Leahy remained a bachelor for his entire life.

Leahy came from a sporting family, and his brothers Paddy, Mick and Tommy all playing inter-county hurling at various times. Paddy won All-Ireland honours with Tipperary in 1916 and 1925. Tommy was a member of the successful Tipperary team of 1930. Mick was a substitute on the victorious team of 1916 and later moved to Cork where he played hurling with Blackrock GAA club. He won All-Ireland medals with Cork in 1928 and 1931.

Leahy also took part in the War of Independence in his native-county. One of his other brothers, Jimmy, was Comdt. of Tipperary No.2 Brigade of the Irish Republican Army.

Johnny Leahy died in January 1949.

Sporting positions
Preceded by	Tipperary Senior Hurling Captain; 1916–1926	Succeeded by
Preceded by	Tipperary Senior Hurling Captain; 1928	Succeeded by
Preceded by Patrick Meagher	Secretary of the Tipperary County Board; 1927–1948	Succeeded by Phil Purcell
Achievements
Preceded by Jack Finlay (Laois)	All-Ireland Senior Hurling Final winning captain 1916	Succeeded by John Ryan (Dublin)
Preceded by Frank Wall (Dublin)	All-Ireland Senior Hurling Final winning captain 1925	Succeeded by Seán Óg Murphy (Cork)
