= 1919 All-Ireland Senior Hurling Championship final =

1919 All-Ireland Senior Hurling Final
- Event: 1919 All-Ireland Senior Hurling Championship
Cork	Dublin
6-4	2-4
- Date: 21 September 1919
- Venue: Croke Park, Dublin
- Referee: Willie Walsh (Waterford)
- Attendance: 14,300

The 1919 All-Ireland Senior Hurling Championship Final was the 32nd All-Ireland Final and the culmination of the 1919 All-Ireland Senior Hurling Championship, an inter-county hurling tournament for the top teams in Ireland. The match was held at Croke Park, Dublin, on 21 September 1919, between Cork, represented by a selection of club players, and Dublin, represented by club side Collegians. The Leinster champions lost to their Munster opponents on a score line of 6–4 to 2–4.

The Cork goals were scored by Connie Lucey, John Barry-Murphy and Jimmy Kennedy who all scored two goals apiece.

== Match details ==
1919-09-21

Cork	6-4 – 2-4	Dublin

Croke Park, Dublin
Attendance: 14,300
Referee: W. Walsh (Clare)

Cork	Dublin

Cork Team 1 Ned Sailor Gray 2 Paddy O'Halloran 3 Sean Og Murphy 4 Mick Murphy 5 Frank Kelleher 6 Connie Sheehan 7 Jim Hassett 8 Tim Nagle 9 John O'Keefe 10 Paddy Balty Ahern 11 Dannix Ring 12 Jimmy Major Kennedy 13 Con Lucy 14 Dick O'Gorman 15 John Barry Murphy
