= 1916 All-Ireland Senior Hurling Championship =

All-Ireland champions
- Winning team: Tipperary (9th win)
- Captain: Johnny Leahy

All-Ireland Finalists
- Losing team: Kilkenny
- Captain: Sim Walton

Provincial champions
- Munster: Tipperary
- Leinster: Kilkenny
- Ulster: Not Played
- Connacht: Galway

Championship statistics
- All-Star Team: See here

The All-Ireland Senior Hurling Championship 1916 was the 30th series of the All-Ireland Senior Hurling Championship, Ireland's premier hurling knock-out competition. Tipperary won the championship, beating Kilkenny 5–4 to 3–2 in the final.

== Format ==
All-Ireland Championship

Semi-final: (1 match) This was a lone match which saw the winners of the Munster championship play Galway who received a bye to this stage. One team was eliminated at this stage while the winning team advanced to the final.

Final: (1 match) The winners of the lone semi-final played the winners of the Leinster championship. The winners were declared All-Ireland champions.

== Results ==
=== Connacht Senior Hurling Championship ===
3 September 1916
Final

Galway	3–0 – 2–3	Roscommon

Athlone

1916
Final Replay

Galway	1–4 – 1–0	Roscommon

=== Leinster Senior Hurling Championship ===
5 November 1916
Final

Kilkenny	11–3 – 2–2	Wexford

Croke Park, Dublin

=== Munster Senior Hurling Championship ===
Final

Tipperary	5–0 – 1–2	Cork

=== Ulster Senior Hurling Championship ===
27 August 1916
Final

Antrim	2–6 – 2–2	Down

Ardglass

=== All-Ireland Senior Hurling Championship ===
22 October 1916
Semi-final

Tipperary	8–1 – 0–0	Galway

Athlone

21 January 1917
Final

Tipperary	5–4 – 3–2	Kilkenny

Croke Park, Dublin

== Sources ==
- Corry, Eoghan, The GAA Book of Lists (Hodder Headline Ireland, 2005).
- Donegan, Des, The Complete Handbook of Gaelic Games (DBA Publications Limited, 2005).
