= Boherlahan–Dualla GAA =

Gaelic games club in County Tipperary, Ireland

Boherlahan–Dualla
- An Bóthar Leathan–Dumha Aille
- Founded: 1912
- County: Tipperary
- Colours: Blue and gold
- Grounds: Boherlahan
- Coordinates: 52°34′15.36″N 7°53′41.59″W

Playing kits
Standard colours

Senior Club Championships
	All Ireland	Munster champions	Tipperary champions
Hurling:	-	-	16

Boherlahan–Dualla GAA is a Gaelic Athletic Association club associated with the villages of Boherlahan and Dualla in County Tipperary, Ireland. The parish of Boherlahan–Dualla is a large parish in Tipperary, and Boherlahan-Dualla GAA club competes in the Mid-Tipperary Division. The Boherlahan–Dualla parish borders seven parishes from three separate divisions, Holycross–Ballycahill GAA and Moycarkey–Borris GAA to the north who play in the Mid-Tipperary division, to the west it borders Knockavilla–Donaskeigh Kickhams GAA, Clonoulty–Rossmore GAA, Golden–Kilfeacle GAA and Cashel King Cormacs GAA, all of whom play in the West Tipperary division, and to the east, Killenaule GAA who play in the South Tipperary division. The club is primarily involved in hurling, and throughout its history has produced many hurlers who have competed for the club and for the Tipperary county team. These include members of the Leahy, Maher, Coffey, and Power families.

== Notable players ==
- Johnny Leahy – Tipperary – (1914–1926)
- Paddy Leahy – Tipperary – (1916–1920,1924–1927)
- Arthur O'Donnell – Tipperary – (1915–1918,1920,1922–1928)
- Jimmy Maher – Tipperary – (1940–1946)
- Sonny Maher – Tipperary – (1947–1951)
- Flor Coffey – Tipperary – (1941–1950)
- Seamus Power – Tipperary – (1971–1979,1984–1986)
- Conor Gleeson – Tipperary – (1995–2004)
- Phil Byrne
- John Coffey
- Aidan Flanagan
- Tom Kevin
- Mick Leahy
- Jack Power
- Paddy Power
- Pat Power
- Tommy Ryan (1890s hurler)
- Ned Wade (Dublin)
- Denis Walsh

Boherlahane only?

- Tommy Leahy
- Jimmy Maher

== Honours ==
- Tipperary Senior Hurling Championship (16): 1896, 1897, 1898, 1901, 1915, 1916, 1917, 1918, 1922, 1924, 1925, 1927, 1928, 1941, 1996
- Tipperary Intermediate Hurling Championship (1): 1981, 2023
- Tipperary Junior A Hurling Championship (5); 1916, 1934, 1935, 1936, 2018
- Tipperary Junior A Football Championship (3): 1951, 1996, 2026
- Tipperary Junior B Hurling Championship (1): 2018
- Tipperary Junior B Football Championship (1): 1999
- Tipperary Under-21 B Football Championship (3): 1991, 2004, 2024
- Tipperary Minor A Hurling Championship (2): 1970, 1993
- Tipperary Minor B Hurling Championship (2): 1988, 1991
- Tipperary Minor B Football Championship (1): 1990
