= 1998 All-Ireland Senior Hurling Championship final =

1998 All-Ireland Senior Hurling Final
- Event: 1998 All-Ireland Senior Hurling Championship
Offaly	Kilkenny
2-16	1-13
- Date: 13 September 1998
- Venue: Croke Park, Dublin
- Man of the Match: Brian Whelahan
- Referee: Dickie Murphy (Wexford)
- Attendance: 65,491
- Weather: Sunny

The 1998 All-Ireland Senior Hurling Championship Final was the 111th All-Ireland Final and the culmination of the 1998 All-Ireland Senior Hurling Championship, an inter-county hurling tournament for the top teams in Ireland. The match was held at Croke Park, Dublin, on 13 September 1998, between Offaly and Kilkenny.

It was the first all-Leinster All-Ireland final with victory going to Offaly managed by Michael Bond on a score line of 2-16 to 1-13. It was the first time that a defeated team from the earlier rounds of the championship had come through to win the All-Ireland final.

13 September
Final

Offaly	2-16 – 1-13	Kilkenny
B. Whelehan (1-6), J. Errity (1-2), J. Troy (0-3), M. Duignan (0-2), Joe Dooley (0-2), J. Pilkington (0-1).	Report	D. J. Carey (0-5), C. Carter (1-1), B. McEvoy (0-3), K. O'Shea (0-2), A. Comerford (0-1), P. Larkin (0-1).

Croke Park, Dublin
Attendance: 65,491
Referee: D. Murphy (Wexford)

Offaly	Kilkenny

OFFALY:
GK	1	Stephen Byrne
RCB	2	Simon Whelahan
FB	3	Kevin Kinahan
LCB	4	Martin Hanamy
RWB	5	Brian Whelahan
CB	6	Hubert Rigney (c)
LWB	7	Kevin Martin
MD	8	Johnny Pilkington
MD	9	Johnny Dooley
RWF	10	Michael Duignan
CF	11	John Troy
LWF	12	Gary Hanniffy
RCF	13	Billy Dooley
FF	14	Joe Errity
LCF	15	Joe Dooley
Substitutes:
	16	Paudie Mulhaire
	17	Darren Hanniffy
	18	John Ryan

KILKENNY:
GK	1	Joe Dermody
RCB	2	Tom Hickey (c)
FB	3	Pat O'Neill
LCB	4	Willie O'Connor
RWB	5	Michael Kavanagh
CB	6	Canice Brennan
LWB	7	Liam Keoghan
MD	8	Phil Larkin
MD	9	Peter Barry
RWF	10	D. J. Carey
CF	11	Andy Comerford
LWF	12	Brian McEvoy
RCF	13	Ken O'Shea
FF	14	P. J. Delaney
LCF	15	Charlie Carter
Substitutes:
	16	Sean Ryan
	17	Niall Moloney
	18	John Costelloe
