= 1999 All-Ireland Senior Hurling Championship final =

1999 All-Ireland Senior Hurling Final
- Event: 1999 All-Ireland Senior Hurling Championship
Cork	Kilkenny
0-13	0-12
- Date: 12 September 1999
- Venue: Croke Park, Dublin
- Man of the Match: Brian Corcoran
- Referee: Pat O'Connor (Limerick)
- Attendance: 62,989
- Weather: Rain

The 1999 All-Ireland Senior Hurling Championship final was the 112th All-Ireland Final and the culmination of the 1999 All-Ireland Senior Hurling Championship, an inter-county hurling tournament for the top teams in Ireland. The match was held at Croke Park, Dublin, on 12 September 1999, between Cork and Kilkenny. The Leinster champions lost to their Munster opponents on a score line of 0-13 to 0-12.

Cork had trailed by a point at half time, 0-5 to 0-4, after playing the better hurling. Then Kilkenny pulled into a four-point lead in the second half, they were 0-11 to 0-8 ahead before Cork scored five unanswered points with Kilkenny only managing one more point from a Henry Shefflin free. Cork, captained by Mark Landers and managed by Jimmy Barry-Murphy held out to win their first All Ireland title since 1990.

It was Cork's 28th All-Ireland hurling title, and the first final in history without a goal.

12 September 1999
Final

Cork	0-13 – 0-12	Kilkenny
J. Deane (0-3), T. McCarthy (0-3), S. McGrath (0-3), M. Landers (0-1), A. Browne (0-1), K. Murray (0-1), B. O'Connor (0-1).	(report)	H. Shefflin (0-5), A. Comerford (0-2), C. Carter (0-2), J. Power (0-1), D. Byrne (0-1), B. McEvoy (0-1).

Croke Park, Dublin
Referee: P. O'Connor (Limerick).

Cork	Kilkenny

GK	1	Donal Óg Cusack
RCB	2	Fergal Ryan
FB	3	Diarmuid O'Sullivan
LCB	4	John Browne
RWB	5	Wayne Sherlock
CB	6	Brian Corcoran
LWB	7	Seán Óg Ó hAilpín
MD	8	Mark Landers (c)
MD	9	Mickey O'Connell
RWF	10	Timmy McCarthy
CF	11	Fergal McCormack
LWF	12	Seanie McGrath
RCF	13	Ben O'Connor
FF	14	Neil Ronan
LCF	15	Joe Deane
Substitutes:
	16	Alan Browne
	17	Kevin Murray

GK	1	James McGarry
RCB	2	Phil Larkin
FB	3	Canice Brennan
LCB	4	Willie O'Connor
RWB	5	Michael Kavanagh
CB	6	Pat O'Neill
LWB	7	Peter Barry
MD	8	Andy Comerford
MD	9	Denis Byrne (c)
RWF	10	D. J. Carey
CF	11	John Power
LWF	12	Brian McEvoy
RCF	13	Ken O'Shea
FF	14	Henry Shefflin
LCF	15	Charlie Carter
Substitutes:
GK	16	P. J. Ryan
	17	P. J. Delaney
	18	Niall Moloney
	19	Eamonn Kennedy
	20	Paddy Mullally
