= Pat O'Neill (Kilkenny hurler) =

Irish hurler

Personal information
- Native name: Pádraig Ó Néill (Irish)
- Born: 12 January 1971 (age 55) Gowran, County Kilkenny, Ireland
- Occupation: Electrician
- Height: 6 ft 2 in (188 cm)

Sport
- Sport: Hurling
- Position: Centre-back
Club
- Years: Club
- Young Irelands
Club titles
- Kilkenny titles: 2
Inter-county
- Years: County
- 1991-1999: Kilkenny
Inter-county titles
- Leinster titles: 5
- All-Irelands: 2
- NHL: 1
- All Stars: 1

Patrick O'Neill (born 12 January 1971) is an Irish former hurler. At club level he played with Young Irelands and was also a member of the Kilkenny senior hurling team. He usually lined out as a centre-back.

== Career ==
O'Neill first came to prominence at juvenile and underage levels with the Young Irelands club before eventually joining the club's top adult team. He had his first success in 1992 when Young Irelands won the County Intermediate Championship before claiming County Senior Championship titles in 1996 and 2002. O'Neill first appeared on the inter-county scene as part of the 1988 All-Ireland Championship-winning minor team, before later claiming an All-Ireland Championship title with the under-21 team. This success saw him drafted onto the Kilkenny senior hurling team in 1991. O'Neill was centre-back on the Kilkenny team that won consecutive All-Ireland Championship titles in 1992 and 1993. His other honours include a National League titles, five Leinster Championship medals, a Railway Cup title with Leinster and an All-Star Award. O'Neill's last major game was the 1999 All-Ireland final defeat by Cork.

== Honours ==
=== Team ===
Young Irelands

- Kilkenny Senior Hurling Championship: 1996, 2002
- Kilkenny Intermediate Hurling Championship: 1992

Kilkenny

- All-Ireland Senior Hurling Championship: 1992, 1993
- Leinster Senior Hurling Championship: 1991, 1992, 1993, 1998, 1999
- National Hurling League: 1994-95
- All-Ireland Under-21 Hurling Championship: 1990
- Leinster Under-21 Hurling Championship: 1990
- All-Ireland Minor Hurling Championship: 1988
- Leinster Minor Hurling Championship: 1988

Leinster

- Railway Cup: 1993

=== Individual ===
Awards

- All-Star Award: 1993
- All-Ireland Senior Hurling Championship Final man of the match: 1993
