= 1997 Kilkenny Senior Hurling Championship =

Annual hurling competition season

- Dates: 16 August 1997 – 12 October 1997
- Teams: 12
- Sponsor: St. Canice's Credit Union
- Champions: Dunnamaggin (1st title); Paul Cahill (captain)
- Runners-up: Young Irelands; Cathal Fitzgerald (captain)
- Relegated: Mooncoin

Tournament statistics
- Matches played: 15
- Goals scored: 46 (3.07 per match)
- Points scored: 303 (20.2 per match)
- Top scorer(s): D. J. Carey (3–16)

The 1997 Kilkenny Senior Hurling Championship was the 103rd staging of the Kilkenny Senior Hurling Championship since its establishment by the Kilkenny County Board. The championship began on 16 August 1997 and ended on 12 October 1997.

Young Irelands were the defending champions.

On 12 October 1997, Dunnamggin won the title after a 2–10 to 2–07 defeat of Young Irelands in the final at Nowlan Park. It was their first ever championship title.

D. J. Carey from the Young Irelands club was the championship's top scorer with 3–16.

== Team changes ==
=== To Championship ===
Promoted from the Kilkenny Intermediate Hurling Championship

- O'Loughlin Gaels

=== From Championship ===
Relegated to the Kilkenny Intermediate Hurling Championship

- John Locke's

== Results ==
=== First round ===
16 August 1997 First round	Glenmore	1–14 – 2–09	Mooncoin	Mullinavat
	R Heffernan 0–5, P Mullally 1–1, P Fitzgerald 0–3, J Murphy 0–2, M Phelan 0–1, J Phelan 0–1, D Heffernan 0–1.		M Walsh 1–2, T Murphy 1–0, T Dunphy 0–2, J Fitzgerald 0–2, G Kirwan 0–1, P Hogan 0–1, L Sutton 0–1.	Referee: J Guinan (Lisdowney)

17 August 1997 First round	Tullaroan	2–08 – 1–07	Fenians	Páirc Lachtáin, Freshford
	B Teehan 2–0, J Coogan 0–3, J Walton 0–2, M Maher 0–1, L Keoghan 0–1, J Breen 0–1.		B Purcell 1–3, K Power 0–2, P Delaney 0–1, Brendan Ryan 0–1.

17 August 1997 First round	Erin's Own	4–10 – 3–13	Graigue-Ballycallan	Nowlan Park, Kilkenny
	B Young 1–5, D Buggy 2–0, E Holland 1–1, M Coogan 0–2, V Smith 0–2.		D Cleere 2–4, J Young 1–0, J Brennan 0–3, D Byrne 0–3, T Dermody 0–2, A Ronan 0–1.	Referee: P Neary (James Stephens)

17 August 1997 First round	O'Loughlin Gaels	0–16 – 1–11	St. Martin's	St. Patrick's Park, Ballyragget
	P Cleere 0–8, B Kelly 0–3, J Daly 0–2, D Ronan 0–1, S Dowling 0–1, J Dowling 0–1.		D Lawlor 0–7, N Moloney 1–3, Brendan Ryan 0–1.

22 August 1997 First round replay	Erin's Own	1–12 – 1–06	Graigue-Ballycallan	Nowlan Park, Kilkenny
	B Young 1–7, V Smith 0–1, D Buggy 0–1, E Holland 0–1, M Owens 0–1, E Brennan 0–1.		T Dermody 1–1, D Cleere 0–3, T Comerford 0–1, J Brennan 0–1.

=== Relegation play-offs ===
6 September 1997 Semi-final	Mooncoin	1–11 – 4–17	St. Martin's	John Locke Park, Callan
	J Murphy 1–2, M Walsh 0–4, D Connolly 0–1, E Mackey 0–1, P Hogan 0–1, G Kirwan 0–1, M Purcell 0–1.		L Dowling 1–4, J Maher 1–2, N Moloney 1–2, D Lawlor 1–2, J Dooley 0–3, D Dooley 0–1, B Ryan 0–1, P Shore 0–1, A Lawlor 0–1.

13 September 1997 Semi-final	Fenians	3–09 – 1–07	Graigue-Ballycallan	Páirc Lachtáin, Freshford
	W Purcell 1–6, D Garrett 1–0, M Phelan 1–0, M Walsh 0–2, Brendan Ryan 0–1.		Joe Young 1–0, D Cleere 0–3, James Young 0–2, J Teehan 0–1.	Referee: E Mahon (Cloneen)

20 September 1997 Final	Mooncoin	0–10 – 2–12	Graigue-Ballycallan	Páirc na Seamróga, Ballyhale
	M Walsh 0–3, T Murphy 0–3, B Quinn 0–1, D Mackey 0–1, J Murphy 0–1, D Connolly 0–1.		D Cleere 0–6, J Hoyne 1–2, A Ronan 1–1, J Teehan 0–1, T Dermody 0–1, E Dwyer 0–1.	Referee: P Neary (James Stephens)

=== Quarter-finals ===
29 August 1997 Quarter-final	Dicksboro	1–10 – 0–08	Tullaroan	Nowlan Park, Kilkenny
	M Hanrick 1–1, T Bawle 0–4, S Kennedy 0–3, D O'Neill 0–1, M Dowling 0–1.		M Maher 0–3, D Gaffney 0–3, J Coogan 0–1, J Walton 0–1.	Referee: E Mahon (Cloneen)

31 August 1997 Quarter-final	O'Loughlin Gaels	0–06 – 0–10	James Stephens	Nowlan Park, Kilkenny
	P Cleere 0–3, A Geoghegan 0–2, T Doyle 0–1.		R Manogue 0–6, P Larkin 0–1, N Lahart 0–1, B McEvoy 0–1, T O'Dowd 0–1.	Referee: J Guinan (Lisdowney)

31 August 1997 Quarter-final	Glenmore	1–10 – 3–08	Young Irelands	Páirc na Seamróga, Ballyhale
	S Dollard 1–0, M Phelan 0–3, R Heffernan 0–2, D Heffernan 0–2, R Mullally 0–1, P Mullally 0–1, J Phelan 0–1.		C Carter 2–1, DJ Carey 0–6, J Carey 1–0, D Carroll 0–1.	Referee: P Neary (James Stephens)

8 September 1997 Quarter-final	Erin's Own	1–07 – 0–18	Dunnamaggin	Nowlan Park, Kilkenny
	E Holland 1–1, B Young 0–2, F Slevin 0–1, M Coogan 0–1, D Buggy 0–1, K Brennan 0–1.		M Moran 0–8, S Ryan 0–5, E Kennedy 0–2, P Kearney 0–1, P Cahill 0–1, K O'Shea 0–1.

=== Semi-finals ===
21 September 1997 Semi-final	Young Irelands	3–14 – 2–13	James Stephens	Nowlan Park, Kilkenny
	DJ Carey 2–8, J Carey 1–0, C Carter 0–3, D Carroll 0–2, C Phelan 0–1.		B McEvoy 0–7, L O'Connor 1–3, T O'Dowd 1–0, K Grogan 0–1, P Barry 0–1, B Leahy 0–1.	Referee: J Guinan (Lisdowney)

21 September 1997 Semi-final	Dunnamaggin	1–09 – 3–01	Dicksboro	Nowlan Park, Kilkenny
	K O'Shea 1–0, M Moran 0–3, E Kennedy 0–2, D Lahart 0–1, P Kearney 0–1, M O'Shea 0–1, S Ryan 0–1.		S Prendergast 2–0, S Morrissey 1–0, S Kennedy 0–1.

=== Final ===
12 October 1997 Final	Dunnamaggin	2–10 – 2–07	Young Irelands	Nowlan Park, Kilkenny
	S Ryan 1–1, E Kennedy 1–1, K O'Shea 0–2, P Kearney 0–2, M Moran 0–2, R Cahill 0–1, M O'Neill 0–1.		DJ Carey 1–2, C Carter 1–0, J Fitzgerald 0–2, C Phelan 0–2, J McDermott 0–1.	Referee: P Neary

== Championship statistics ==
=== Top scorers ===
Overall

Rank	Player	County	Tally	Total	Matches	Average
1	D. J. Carey	Young Irelands	3–16	25	3	8.33
2	Damien Cleere	Graigue-Ballycallan	2–16	22	4	5.50
3	Brian Young	Erin's Own	2–14	20	3	6.66
4	Willie Purcell	Fenians	2-09	15	2	7.50
5	Charlie Carter	Young Irelands	3-04	13	3	4.33
5	Michael Moran	Dunnamaggin	0–13	13	3	4.33
6	Michael Walsh	Mooncoin	1-09	12	3	4.00
6	Damien Lawlor	St. Martin's	1-09	12	2	6.00
7	Niall Moloney	St. Martin's	2-05	11	2	5.50
7	Paul Cleere	O'Loughlin Gaels	0–11	11	2	5.50

Single game

Rank	Player	County	Tally	Total	Opposition
1	D. J. Carey	Young Irelands	2-08	14	James Stephens
2	Damien Cleere	Graigue-Ballycallan	2-04	10	Erin's Own
2	Brian Young	Erin's Own	1-07	10	Graigue-Ballycallan
3	Willie Purcell	Fenians	1-06	9	Graigue-Ballycallan
4	Brian Young	Erin's Own	1-05	8	Graigue-Ballycallan
4	Paul Cleere	O'Loughlin Gaels	0-08	8	St. Martin's
4	Michael Moran	Dunnamaggin	0-08	8	Erin's Own
5	Charlie Carter	Young Irelands	2-01	7	Glenmore
5	Liam Dowling	St. Martin's	1-04	7	Mooncoin
5	Damien Lawlor	St. Martin's	0-07	7	O'Loughlin Gaels
5	Brian McEvoy	James Stephens	0-07	7	Young Irelands
