= 2005 Kilkenny Senior Hurling Championship =

Annual hurling competition season

- Teams: 12
- Sponsor: St. Canice's Credit Union
- Champions: James Stephens (8th title); Peter Barry (captain); Adrian Finan (manager)
- Runners-up: Ballyhale Shamrocks; Aidan Cummins (captain)
- Relegated: Glenmore

Tournament statistics
- Matches played: 12
- Goals scored: 28 (2.33 per match)
- Points scored: 312 (26 per match)
- Top scorer(s): Eoin Larkin (0-25)

The 2005 Kilkenny Senior Hurling Championship was the 111th staging of the Kilkenny Senior Hurling Championship since its establishment by the Kilkenny County Board.

James Stephens were the defending champions.

On 2 October 2005, Glenmore were relegated after a 2–11 to 0–15 defeat by Fenians.

On 23 October 2005, James Stephens won the title after a 1–18 to 2–12 defeat of Ballyhale Shamrocks in the final at Nowlan Park. It was their eighth championship title overall and their second title in succession.

Eoin Larkin from the James Stephens club was the championship's top scorer with 0-25.

== Team changes ==
=== To Championship ===
Promoted from the Kilkenny Intermediate Hurling Championship

- Carrickshock

=== From Championship ===
Relegated to the Kilkenny Intermediate Hurling Championship

- Dicksboro

== Results ==
=== First round ===
First round	Young Irelands	3-18 - 1-10	Dunnamaggin
	T Drennan 1-5, DJ Carey 1-4, C Carter 1-2, D Carroll 0-2, C Carter 0-1.P acrroll 0-1, L Phelan 0-1, F Farrell 0-1, A Doyle 0-1.		S O'Neill 1-3, C Herity 0-5, JP O'Neill 0-1, J Hickey 0-1.

First round	St. Martin's	0-15 - 0-12	Glenmore
	D Lawlor 0-4, John Maher 0-2, E McGrath 0-2, S Coonan 0-2, N Moloney 0-2, P Maher 0-1, B Mulhall 0-1, A Lawlor 0-1.		M Maher 0-7, P Fitzgerald 0-3, E Dollard 0-1, J Phelan 0-1.

First round	Carrickshock	0-12 - 1-08	Fenians
	R Power 0-4, J Dalton 0-3, M Rice 0-1, J Power 0-1, J Moran 0-1.		K Power 0-5, P Dunlea 1-0, B Ryan 0-2, L Ryan 0-1.

First round	O'Loughlin Gaels	0-14 - 1-06	Erin's Own
	N Skehan 0-6, A Geoghegan 0-4, B Dowling 0-2, M Nolan 0-1, J Comerford 0-1.		M Boran 1-0, D Fogarty 0-2, R Ryan 0-2, C Dunne 0-1, S Byrne 0-1.

=== Relegation play-off ===
2 October 2005 Play-off	Fenians	2-11 - 0-15	Glenmore	Nowlan Park, Kilkenny
	S Grehan 0-7, L Ryan 1-2, K Power 1-0, J Whelan 0-1, P Quinlan 0-1.		M Phelan 0-7, P Fitzgerald 0-2, R Mullally 0-2, E Dollard 0-1, P Mullally 0-1, M Murphy 0-1, S Dollard 0-1.

=== Quarter-finals ===
Quarter-final	Ballyhale Shamrocks	3-20 - 3-08	St. Martin's
	H Shefflin 1-7, E Reid 1-4, J Fitzpatrick 1-3, D Hoyne 0-2, M Aylward 0-2, M Fennelly 0-1, P Reid 0-1.		D Lawlor 0-6, A Lawlor 1-1, S Coonan 0-1.

Quarter-final	James Stephens	0-16 - 0-10	Carrickshock
	E Larkin 0-7, E McCormack 0-3, D Cody 0-2, P O'Brien 0-1, G Whelan 0-1, D McCormack 0-1, J Murray 0-1.		R Power 0-4, J Moran 0-2, J Dalton 0-1, M Rice 0-1, J Power 0-1, P Cleary 0-1.

Quarter-final	Graigue-Ballycallan	3-12 - 1-13	Young Irelands
	K Cleere 0-6, E Brennan 1-2, A Ronan 1-0, J Hoyne 1-0, J Young 0-2, J Dunphy 0-1, T Dermody 0-1.		DJ Carey 0-6, D Carroll 1-2, O Carter 0-2, C Phelan 0-1, J Fitzgerald 0-1, M Carey 0-1.

Quarter-final	O'Loughlin Gaels	3-17 - 0-11	Tullaroan
	N Skehan 1-5, M Comerford 0-5, M Nolan 1-1, J Lawlor 1-0, B Dowling 0-2, B Hogan 0-1, A Geoghegan 0-1, B Kelly 0-1, J Comerford 0-1.		T Fitzgerald 0-5, R Cleere 0-2, M Maher 0-2, T Walsh 0-1, P Donehny 0-1.

=== Semi-finals ===
Semi-final	Ballyhale Shamrocks	1-19 - 1-10	O'Loughlin Gaels	Nowlan Park, Kilkenny
	H Shefflin 0-8, J Fitzpatrick 0-4, P Reid 1-0, M Aylward 0-3, TJ Reid 0-2, E Reid 0-1, D Hoyne 0-1.		N Skehan 0-7, J Lawlor 1-2, B Dowling 0-1.

Semi-final	James Stephens	2-16 - 1-09	Graigue-Ballycallan	Nowlan Park, Kilkenny
	E Larkin 0-9, D McCormack 1-1, G Whelan 1-0, J Murray 0-2, E McCormack 0-2, P O'Brien 0-1, R Hayes 0-1.		M Hoyne 1-0, K Cleere 0-3, J Young 0-2, E Brennan 0-2, J Dunphy 0-1, J Hoyne 0-1.

=== Final ===
23 October 2005 Final	James Stephens	1-18 - 2-12	Ballyhale Shamrocks	Nowlan Park, Kilkenny
	E Larkin (0-9, six frees), E McCormack (1-2), D McCormack (0-2), S Egan (0-2), B McEvoy (0-2); P O'Brien (0-1).		TJ Reid (1-2); E Reid (1-1), D Hoyne (0-3), J Fitzpatrick (0-2), H Shefflin (0-2, two frees), M Aylward (0-1), T Coogan (0-1).	Referee: E Crowley (Mooncoin)

== Championship statistics ==
=== Top scorers ===
Top scorers overall

Rank	Player	Club	Tally	Total	Matches	Average
1	Eoin Larkin	James Stephens	0-25	25	3	8.33
2	Nigel Skehan	O'Loughlin Gaels	1-18	21	3	7.00
3	Henry Shefflin	Ballyhale Shamrocks	1-18	20	3	6.66
4	Michael Phelan	Glenmore	0-14	14	2	7.00
5	D. J. Carey	Young Irelands	1-10	13	2	6.50
6	Eoin Reid	Ballyhale Shamrocks	2-06	12	3	4.00
6	James Fitzpatrick	Ballyhale Shamrocks	1-09	12	3	4.00
7	Eoin McCormack	James Stephens	1-07	10	3	3.33
7	Dermot Lawlor	St. Martin's	1-07	10	3	3.33
8	Kevin Cleere	Graigue-Ballycallan	0-09	9	2	4.50

Top scorers in a single game

Rank	Player	Club	Tally	Total	Opposition
1	Henry Shefflin	Ballyhale Shamrocks	1-07	10	St. Martin's
2	Eoin Larkin	James Stephens	0-09	9	Graigue-Ballycallan
2	Eoin Larkin	James Stephens	0-09	9	Ballyhale Shamrocks
3	Thomas Drennan	Young Irelands	1-05	8	Dunnamaggin
3	Nigel Skehan	O'Loughlin Gaels	1-05	8	Tullaroan
3	Henry Shefflin	Ballyhale Shamrocks	0-08	8	O'Loughlin Gaels
4	D. J. Carey	Young Irelands	1-04	7	Dunnamaggin
4	Eoin Reid	Ballyhale Shamrocks	1-04	7	St. Martin's
4	Michael Phelan	Glenmore	0-07	7	St. Martin's
4	Stephen Grehan	Fenians	0-07	7	Glenmore
4	Michael Phelan	Glenmore	0-07	7	Fenians
4	Eoin Larkin	James Stephens	0-07	7	Carrickshock
4	Nigel Skehan	O'Loughlin Gaels	1-05	8	Ballyhale Shamrocks
