= 2004 Kilkenny Senior Hurling Championship =

Annual hurling competition season

- Dates: 25 September 2004 – 31 October 2004
- Teams: 12
- Sponsor: St. Canice's Credit Union
- Champions: James Stephens (2nd title); Peter Barry (captain); Adrian Finan (manager)
- Runners-up: Young Irelands; James Fitzgerald (captain)
- Relegated: Dicksboro

Tournament statistics
- Matches played: 15
- Goals scored: 32 (2.13 per match)
- Points scored: 372 (24.8 per match)
- Top scorer: D. J. Carey (5-35)

The 2004 Kilkenny Senior Hurling Championship was the 110th staging of the Kilkenny Senior Hurling Championship since its establishment by the Kilkenny County Board in 1887. The championship began on 25 September 2004 and ended on 31 October 2004.

O'Loughlin Gaels were the defending champions, however, they were defeated by James Stephens at the semi-final stage.

On 17 October 2004, Dicksboro were relegated following a 0–12 to 1–08 defeat by St. Martin's.

On 31 October 2004, James Stephens won the title after a 2–16 to 3–12 defeat of Young Irelands in the final at Nowlan Park. It was their seventh championship title overall and their first title since 1981.

D. J. Carey from the Young Irelands club was the championship's top scorer with 5-35.

== Team changes ==
=== To Championship ===
Promoted from the Kilkenny Intermediate Hurling Championship

- Erin's Own

=== From Championship ===
Relegated to the Kilkenny Intermediate Hurling Championship

- Mullinavat

== Results ==
=== First round ===
25 September 2004 First round	Fenians	2-13 - 0-11	St. Martin's	Nowlan Park, Kilkenny
	K Power 1-7, P Quinlan 1-0, L Ryan 0-3, B Ryan 0-1, E Behan 0-1, B Power 0-1.		D Lawlor 0-8, L Dowling 0-1, S Coonan 0-1, N Moloney 0-1.

25 September 2004 First round	Dunnamaggin	2-14 - 0-18	Glenmore	Mullinavat Sportsfield, Mullinavat
	C Herity 0-5, S O'Neill 0-4, N McCormack 1-0, L Heffernan 1-0, C Hickey 0-2, K O'Shea 0-1, B Moore 0-1, B O'Shea 0-1.		P Mullally 0-6, P Fitzgerald 0-5, M Murphy 0-2, E O'Connor 0-2, R Mullally 0-1, K Cotteral 0-1, J Phelan 0-1.

25 September 2004 First round	Ballyhale Shamrocks	2-11 - 0-13	Erin's Own	Nowlan Park, Kilkenny
	H Shefflin 1-4, E Reid 1-0, D Hoyne 0-2, K Nolan 0-2, P Reid 0-2, B Aylward 0-1.		D Buggy 0-3, E Brennan 0-3, J Feehan 0-2, M Boran 0-2, R Ryan 0-1, J Buggy 0-1, K Brennan 0-1.

26 September 2004 First round	Young Irelands	2-11 - 0-14	Dicksboro	Thomastown Sportsfield, Thomastown
	DJ Carey 1-6, D Carter 1-1, C Carter 0-2, D Carroll 0-1, C Phelan 0-1.		G Henderson 0-5, D O'Gorman 0-4, E O'Donoghue 0-3, P O'Flynn 0-1, B Barry 0-1.

=== Relegation play-off ===
17 October 2004 Play-off	St. Martin's	0-12 - 1-08	Dicksboro	Páirc Lachtáin, Freshford
	John Maher 0-6, S Coonan 0-3, R Maher 0-1, P Maher 0-1, N Moloney 0-1.		S McGarry 1-0, P O'Flynn 0-3, B Barry 0-1, J Maher 0-1, D O'Gorman 0-1, E O'Donoghue 0-1, G Henderson 0-1.

=== Quarter-finals ===
2 October 2004 Quarter-final	O'Loughlin Gaels	0-15 - 1-12	Ballyhale Shamrocks	John Locke Park, Callan
	A Geoghegan 0-7, B Dowling 0-5, M Comerford 0-2, M Nolan 0-1.		H Shefflin 1-7, D Hoyne 0-2, M Fennelly 0-1, M Aylward 0-1, B Aylward 0-1.

2 October 2004 Quarter-final	James Stephens	0-12 - 0-09	Dunnamaggin	John Locke Park, Callan
	E Larkin 0-8, J Murphy 0-2, E McCormack 0-1, D McCormack 0-1.		C Herity 0-5, S O'Neill 0-2, B Moore 0-1, K O'Shea 0-1.

3 October 2004 Quarter-final	Tullaroan	2-13 - 3-08	Fenians	Nowlan Park, Kilkenny
	M Walsh 1-1, J Coogan 0-4, B Behan 0-3, P Doheny 0-2, T Walsh 0-1, C Maher 0-1, N Maher 0-1.		K Power 2-7, J Whelan 1-0, E Behan 0-1.

3 October 2004 Quarter-final	Young Irelands	1-11 - 0-14	Graigue-Ballycallan	Nowlan Park, Kilkenny
	DJ Carey 1-6, D Carroll 0-2, O Carter 0-1, T Carroll 0-1, D Carter 0-1.		P Kennedy 0-5, A Ronan 0-4, M Hoyle 0-1, J Young 0-1, J Dunphy 0-1, J Hoyne 0-1, E Brennan 0-1.

9 October 2004 Quarter-final replay	O'Loughlin Gaels	1-12 - 0-12	Ballyhale Shamrocks	John Locke Park, Callan
	N Skehan 0-7, S Cummins 1-1, M Comerford 0-2, B Dowling 0-2.		H Shefflin 0-5, M Aylward 0-2, K Nolan 0-1, T Coogan 0-1, D Hoyne 0-1, E Reid 0-1, P Reid 0-1.

10 October 2004 Quarter-final replay	Young Irelands	1-17 - 2-11	Graigue-Ballycallan	Nowlan Park, Kilkenny
	DJ Carey 0-11, C Carter 0-4, D Carter 1-0, D Carroll 0-1, T Carroll 0-1.		E Brennan 1-4, J Young 1-1, M Hoyne 0-2, A Ronan 0-1, P Kennedy 0-1, T Dermody 0-1, K Cleere 0-1.

=== Semi-finals ===
17 October 2004 Semi-final	Young Irelands	1-18 - 1-09	Tullaroan	Nowlan Park, Kilkenny
	DJ Carey 0-6, C Carter 0-6, D Carter 1-2, O Carter 0-2, D Carroll 0-1, C Phelan 0-1.		J Coogan 0-5, B Teehan 1-0, S Hennessy 0-3, N Sweeney 0-1.	Referee: J Guinan (St. Lachtain's)

17 October 2004 Semi-final	James Stephens	2-13 - 2-13	O'Loughlin Gaels	Nowlan Park, Kilkenny
	E Larkin 0-8, G Whelan 1-0, B McEvoy 1-0, P Larkin 0-1, P Butler 0-1, E McCormack 0-1, R Hayes 0-1, J Murphy 0-1.		S Cummins 1-1, M Nolan 1-0, A Geoghegan 0-3, J Lawlor 0-3, B Dowling 0-2, N Skehan 0-2, A Comerford 0-1, M Comerford 0-1.	Referee: D Connolly (Mooncoin)

24 October 2004 Semi-final replay	James Stephens	1-12 - 0-08	O'Loughlin Gaels	Nowlan Park, Kilkenny
	E Larkin 1-8, J Murphy 0-2, J Tyrrell 0-1, G Whelan 0-1.		A Geoghegan 0-3, M Nolan 0-2, B Dowling 0-2, M Comerford 0-1.	Referee: D O'Sullivan (John Locke's)

=== Final ===
31 October 2004 Final	James Stephens	2-16 - 3-12	Young Irelands	Nowlan Park, Kilkenny
	E Larkin 0-11 (7f), E McCormack 0-3, G Whelan, J Murray 1-0, J Murphy, D McCormack 0-1 each.		DJ Carey 3-6 (2-6f, 1-0 pen), C Carter, D Carter 0-2 each, O Carter, D Carroll 0-1 each.	Referee: D Connelly (Mooncoin)

== Championship statistics ==
=== Top scorers ===
Top scorers overall

Rank	Player	Club	Tally	Total	Matches	Average
1	D. J. Carey	Young Irelands	5-35	50	5	10.00
2	Eoin Larkin	James Stephens	1-35	38	4	9.50
3	Kevin Power	Fenians	3-14	23	2	11.50
4	Henry Shefflin	Ballyhale Shamrocks	2-16	22	3	7.33
5	David Carter	Young Irelands	3-06	15	5	3.00
6	Charlie Carter	Young Irelands	0-14	14	5	2.80
7	Alan Geoghegan	O'Loughlin Gaels	0-13	13	3	4.33
8	Brian Dowling	O'Loughlin Gaels	0-11	11	3	3.66
9	Colin Herity	Dunnamaggin	0-10	10	2	5.00
10	Jimmy Coogan	Tullaroan	0-09	9	2	4.50
10	Nigel Skehan	O'Loughlin Gaels	0-09	9	3	3.00

Top scorers in a single game

Rank	Player	Club	Tally	Total	Opposition
1	D. J. Carey	Young Irelands	3-06	15	James Stephens
2	Kevin Power	Fenians	2-07	13	Tullaroan
3	Eoin Larkin	James Stephens	1-08	11	O'Loughlin Gaels
3	D. J. Carey	Young Irelands	0-11	11	Graigue-Ballycallan
3	Eoin Larkin	James Stephens	0-11	11	Young Irelands
4	Kevin Power	Fenians	1-07	10	St. Martin's
4	Henry Shefflin	Ballyhale Shamrocks	1-07	10	O'Loughlin Gaels
5	D. J. Carey	Young Irelands	1-06	9	Dicksboro
5	D. J. Carey	Young Irelands	1-06	9	Graigue-Ballycallan
6	Dermot Lawlor	St. Martin's	0-08	8	Fenians
6	Eoin Larkin	James Stephens	0-08	8	Dunnamaggin
6	Eoin Larkin	James Stephens	0-08	8	O'Loughlin Gaels
