= Martin Carey =

Martin Carey may refer to:

- Martin Carey (hurler) (born 1974), Irish hurler who played as a goalkeeper for the Kilkenny senior team
- Martin T. Carey (1922–2020), American businessman and real estate investor
