= 2005 All-Ireland Senior Club Hurling Championship final =

2005 All-Ireland Senior Club Hurling Championship Final
- Event: 2004–05 All-Ireland Senior Club Hurling Championship
James Stephens	Athenry
0-19	0-14
- Date: 17 March 2005
- Venue: Croke Park, Dublin
- Man of the Match: Eoin Larkin
- Referee: Séamus Roche (Tipperary)
- Attendance: 31,236

The 2005 All-Ireland Senior Club Hurling Championship final was a hurling match played at Croke Park on 17 March 2005 to determine the winners of the 2004–05 All-Ireland Senior Club Hurling Championship, the 35th season of the All-Ireland Senior Club Hurling Championship, a tournament organised by the Gaelic Athletic Association for the champion clubs of the four provinces of Ireland. The final was contested by James Stephens of Kilkenny and Athenry of Galway, with James Stephens winning by 0–19 to 0–14.

The All-Ireland final was a unique occasion as it was the first ever championship meeting between James Stephens and Athenry. It remains their only clash in the All-Ireland series. Athenry were hoping to make history by winning a record-equaling fourth All-Ireland title.

A tight first half saw James Stephens' Peter Barry turn in a big performance in the half-back line alongside Philly Larkin and Jackie Tyrrell to keep the Athenry forwards in check. The sides were level eight times in that 30 minute period with Eoin Larkin accounting for 0-7 of James Stephens' tally. Athenry captain Eugene Cloonan was their chief scorer with 0-4 from placed balls to keep the Galway outfit in with a good shout as they trailed by 0–10 to 0–9 at the interval.

Joe Murphy scored immediately after the restart for Stephens to open up a two-point margin for the first time in the game at 0–11 to 0–9. It was a visible turning point and they quickly pulled further away with points from Eoin McCormack, Richie Hayes and David McCormack to lead 0–14 to 0–10. Cloonan responded with a couple of points for Athenry. James Stephens had a 0–16 to 0–12 lead coming into the final stage, and three unanswered points from Eoin McCormack ultimately eased the Leinster champions to All-Ireland glory.

James Stephens' All-Ireland victory was their first since 1982. The win gave them their third All-Ireland title over all and put them joint second on the all-time roll of honour along with Athenry, Blackrock and Ballyhale Shamrocks.

Athenry were appearing in their first All-Ireland final since they triumphed in 2001. It was their second All-Ireland defeat from five final appearances.

== Match ==
=== Details ===
17 March 2005

James Stephens	0-19 - 0-14	Athenry
E Larkin 0-9 (5f, 2 '65', 1 pen); E McCormack 0-5; D McCormack 0-2; P O'Brien, R Hayes, J Murphy 0-1 each.	Report	E Cloonan 0-6 (5f); D Donohue, D Moran 0-2 each; MJ Quinn, B Higgins, J Rabbitte, B Hanley (line ball) 0-1.

Croke Park, Dublin
Attendance: 31,236
Referee: S Roche (Tipperary)

James Stephens	Dunloy
