= Paul Cahill =

Paul Cahill may refer to:

- Paul Cahill (English footballer) (1955–2021), English soccer player; played in England and America
- Paul Cahill (hurler) (born 1976), Irish hurler
- Paul Cahill (Australian rules footballer) (born 1990), Australian rules footballer with 2009 St Kilda Football Club season
