= 1996 Kilkenny Senior Hurling Championship =

Annual hurling competition season

- Dates: 10 August 1996 – 20 October 1996
- Teams: 12
- Sponsor: St. Canice's Credit Union
- Champions: Young Irelands (1st title); D. J. Carey (captain)
- Runners-up: James Stephens; Philly Larkin (captain)
- Relegated: John Locke's

Tournament statistics
- Matches played: 17
- Top scorer(s): D. J. Carey (5-25)

The 1996 Kilkenny Senior Hurling Championship was the 102nd staging of the Kilkenny Senior Hurling Championship since its establishment by the Kilkenny County Board in 1887. The championship began on 10 August 1996 and ended on 20 October 1996.

Glenmore were the defending champions but were defeated by Young Irelands in the first round.

On 20 October 1996, Young Irelands won the title after a 3–09 to 2–10 defeat of James Stephens in a final replay at Nowlan Park. It was their first ever championship title.

D. J. Carey from the Young Irelands club was the championship's top scorer with 5-35.

== Team changes ==
=== To Championship ===
Promoted from the Kilkenny Intermediate Hurling Championship

- Dunnamaggin

=== From Championship ===
Relegated to the Kilkenny Intermediate Hurling Championship

- Ballyhale Shamrocks

== Results ==
=== First round ===
10 August 1996 First round	James Stephens	2-09 - 1-09	Tullaroan	John Locke Park, Callan
	B Leahy 2-2, R Manogue 0-3, L Smith 0-3, P Larkin 0-1.		J Walton 1-2, D Gaffney 0-5, J Coogan 0-2.	Referee: P Hayes (Graigue-Ballycallan)

10 August 1996 First round	St. Martin's	1-16 - 1-12	John Locke's	Nowlan Park, Kilkenny
	L Dowling 0-7, N Moloney 1-3, J Brennan 0-2, B Ryan 0-1, P Shore 0-1, J Maher 0-1, D Comerford 0-1.		PJ Cody 0-5, J Power 1-0, JP Corcoran 0-3, D Maher 0-2, D Lynch 0-1, A Power 0-1.	Referee: D Cody (Graignamanagh)

11 August 1996 First round	Young Irelands	3-13 - 3-10	Glenmore	Páirc na Seamróg, Ballyhale
	C Carter 1-4, DJ Carey 1-4, D O'Neill 1-1, J McDermott 0-1, J Fitzgerald 0-1, J Farrell 0-1, A O'Neill 0-1.		R Heffernan 1-5, J Phelan 1-2, M Murphy 1-1, M Phelan 0-1, D Mullally 0-1.	Referee: P Neary (James Stephens)

11 August 1996 First round	Dunnamaggin	2-09 - 1-08	Erin's Own	Nowlan Park, Kilkenny
	K O'Shea 1-2, M O'Shea 1-0, S Ryan 0-2, M O'Neill 0-2, R Cahill 0-2, D Lahart 0-1.		K Brennan 1-2, D Buggy 0-5, J Breen 0-1.	Referee: P Dunphy (Rower-Inistioge)

=== Relegation play-offs ===
21 September 1996 Semi-final	Glenmore	1-15 - 3-07	Erin's Own	John Locke Park, Callan
				Referee: P Hayes

21 September 1996 Semi-final	Tullaroan	1-15 - 0-09	John Locke's	Hugginstown Sportsfield, Hugginstown
	D Gaffney 1-06, B Hennessey 0-03, J Walton 0-03, M Maher 0-02, J Coogan 0-01		P.J. Cody 0-07, J Power 0-02	Referee: P Dunphy

28 September 1996 Final	Erin's Own	1-09 - 1-09	John Locke's	Nowlan Park, Kilkenny
	D Buggy 1-5, K Brennan 0-3, J Buggy 0-1.		PJ Cody 0-5, D Lynch 1-0, J Power 0-2, D Maher 0-2.	Referee: P Dunphy (Carrigeen)

5 October 1996 Final replay	Erin's Own	2-12 - 2-11	John Locke's	Nowlan Park, Kilkenny
	B Young 0-8, F Slevin 1-2, D Buggy 1-1, K Brennan 0-1.		PJ Cody 0-8, D Maher 1-1, J Power 1-0, S Donovan 0-1, A O'Sullivan 0-1.

=== Quarter-finals ===
7 September 1996 Quarter-final	Dunnamaggin	0-12 - 0-09	Dicksboro	John Locke Park, Callan
	M Moran 0-4, S Ryan 0-3, E Kennedy 0-2, P Kearney 0-1, M O'Shea 0-1, R Cahill 0-1.		T Bawle 0-5, D O'Neill 0-2, M Dowling 0-1, S Kennedy 0-1.	Referee: D Cody (Graiguenamanagh)

7 September 1996 Quarter-final	Mooncoin	2-07 - 0-13	James Stephens	John Locke Park, Callan
	M Walsh 2-2, T Murphy 0-1, G Kirwan 0-1, E Mackey 0-1, M Purcell 0-1, J Murphy 0-1.		R Manogue 0-5, P Larkin 0-4, P Barry 0-2, L O'Connor 0-1, N Brennan 0-1.	Referee: J Guinan (Lisdowney)

8 September 1996 Quarter-final	Young Irelands	3-11 - 1-14	Graigue-Ballycallan	Nowlan Park, Kilkenny
	DJ Carey 1-4, C Carter 1-2, D O'Neill 1-1, P O'Neill 0-2, A O'Neill 0-2.		D Cleere 1-2, A Ronan 0-4, T Dermody 0-3, J Brennan 0-2, J Teehan 0-1, T McCluskey 0-1, D Byrne 0-1.	Referee: E McMahon (Cloneen)

8 September 1996 Quarter-final	Fenians	2-17 - 2-09	St. Martin's	Nowlan Park, Kilkenny
	PJ Delaney 2-0, Brian Ryan 0-5, B Purcell 0-5, Brendan Ryan 0-3, E Behan 0-2, S Grehan 0-1, PJ Ryan 0-1.		N Moloney 2-5, D Dooley 0-2, D Comerford 0-1, J Maher 0-1.	Referee: P Dunphy (Carrigeen)

15 September 1996 Quarter-final replay	Mooncoin	1-09 - 0-14	James Stephens	John Locke Park, Callan
	M Walsh 0-6, M Purcell 1-0, G Kirwan 0-2, T Dunphy 0-1.		R Manogue 0-7, N Brennan 0-2, B Leahy 0-2, B Smith 0-1, J Scott 0-1, P Barry 0-1.	Referee: J Guinan (Lisdowney)

=== Semi-finals ===
22 September 1996 Semi-final	Young Irelands	1-12 - 0-11	Dunnamaggin	Nowlan Park, Kilkenny
	DJ Carey 0-8, D Carroll 1-0, C Carter 0-1, J McDermott 0-1, J Fitzgerald 0-1, D Farell 0-1.		M Moran 0-5, S Ryan 0-2, M O'Shea 0-2, R O'Neill 0-1, K O'Shea 0-1.	Referee: P Hayes (Graigue-Ballycallan)

22 September 1996 Semi-final	James Stephens	2-18 - 0-15	Fenians	Nowlan Park, Kilkenny
	R Manogue 1-8, B Leahy 1-2, N Brennan 0-2, B McEvoy 0-2, L O'Connor 0-1, J Scott 0-1, P Barry 0-1, L Smith 0-1.		E Behan 0-3, PJ Ryan 0-3, PJ Delaney 0-43, K Power 0-3, Brendan Ryan 0-1, Brian Ryan 0-1, S Grehan 0-1.	Referee: P Dunphy (Carrigeen)

=== Final ===
6 October 1996 Final	Young Irelands	2-10 - 0-16	James Stephens	Nowlan Park, Kilkenny
	DJ Carey 1-5, C Carter 1-3, T Farrell 0-1, D O'Neill 0-1.		R Manogue 0-7, B McEvoy 0-2, N Brennan 0-2, B Leahy 0-2, L O'Connor 0-1, P Larkin 0-1, L Smith 0-1.

20 October 1996 Final replay	Young Irelands	3-09 - 2-10	James Stephens	Nowlan Park, Kilkenny
	DJ Carey 2-4, G Carey 1-0, P Farrell 0-3, C Carter 0-1, G Fitzgerald 0-1.		B McEvoy 2-1, R Manogue 0-6, L O'Connor 0-1, V O'Brien 0-1, P Larkin 0-1.	Referee: P Dunphy

== Championship statistics ==
=== Scoring ===
Top scorers overall

Rank	Player	Club	Tally	Total	Matches

1st - DJ Carey Young Irelands 5-25 : 5 games

2nd - Richie Minogue James Stephens 1-29 : 5 games

3rd - PJ Cody John Lockes 0-25 : 4 games

4th - Niall Moloney St. Martins 3-08 : 2 games

5th - Brian Leahy James Stephens 3-08 : 5 games
