= D. J. Carey =

Kilkenny hurler

D. J . Carey
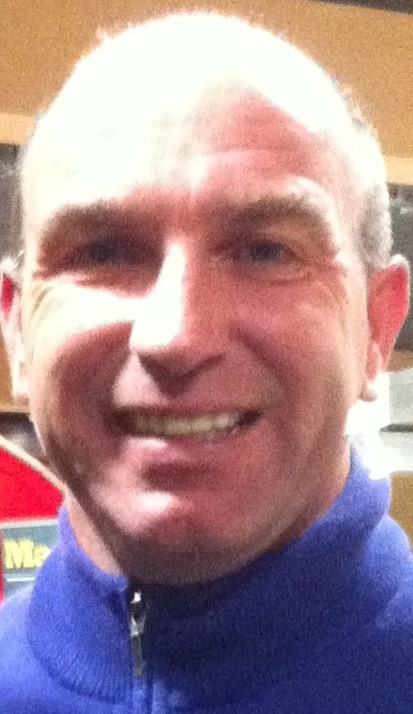

Personal information
- Native name: Donncha Seosamh Ó Ciara (Irish)
- Nickname: The Dodger
- Born: 11 November 1970 (age 55) Gowran, County Kilkenny, Ireland
- Occupation: Incarcerated
- Height: 5 ft 11 in (180 cm)

Sport
- Sport: Hurling
- Position: Left corner-forward
Club*
| Years | Club | Apps (scores) |
| 1988–2013 | Young Irelands | 39 (36-165) |
Club titles
- Kilkenny titles: 2
Inter-county**
| Years | County | Apps (scores) |
| 1989–2006 | Kilkenny | 57 (33–108) |
Inter-county titles
- Leinster titles: 10
- All-Irelands: 5
- NHL: 4
- All Stars: 9
- * club appearances and scores correct as of 16:56, 18 August 2006 (UTC). **Inter County team apps and scores correct as of 16:56, 1 June 2018 (UTC).

Denis Joseph Carey (born 11 November 1970), often abbreviated to D.J. Carey, is an Irish former hurler and convicted criminal. He played as a left corner-forward at senior level for the Kilkenny county team. In July 2025, he pled guilty to ten counts of deception, and was sentenced to five and a half years’ imprisonment in November 2025.

Carey began his hurling career at club level with Young Irelands. He broke onto the club's top adult team as a 17-year-old in 1988 and enjoyed his first success in 1992 when the club won the Kilkenny Intermediate Championship title and promotion to the top flight of Kilkenny hurling. Carey later won Kilkenny Senior Championship medals as captain in 1996 and 2002. He made numerous championship appearances in three different grades of hurling for the club before retiring after a 25-year club career in 2013.

At inter-county level, Carey was part of the successful Kilkenny minor team that won the All-Ireland Championship in 1988 before later the All-Ireland Championships with the under-21 team in 1990. He joined the Kilkenny senior team in 1988. From his debut, Carey was ever-present as a forward and made a combined total of 138 National League and Championship appearances in a career that ended with his last game in 2005. During that time he was part of five All-Ireland Championship-winning teams – in 1992, 1993, 2000, 2002 and 2003. Carey also secured ten Leinster Championship medals and four National Hurling League medals. He announced his retirement from inter-county hurling on 1 June 2006.

Carey's granduncle, Paddy Phelan, won four All-Ireland medals with Kilkenny. His aunt, Peggy Carey, won four All-Ireland medal with the Kilkenny camogie team. Carey's brother, Martin, was sub goalkeeper on the Kilkenny team for a number of years.

Carey has been described as "GAA's first superstar" and a "hurling legend". During his playing days he won nine All-Star awards, as well as being named Texaco Hurler of the Year on two occasions. He has been repeatedly voted onto teams made up of the sport's greats, including on the Kilkenny Hurling Team of the Century in 2000 and on a special Leinster Hurling Team (1984-2009). Carey's omission from the Hurling Team of the Millennium was seen as controversial at the time.

In retirement from playing, he became involved in team management and coaching. At club level he has trained the Young Irelands junior hurling team, while he has also served as hurling coach at Carlow Institute of Technology. Carey's business and personal life has also been the subject of significant coverage.

== Early and personal life ==
Denis Joseph Carey was born in Kilkenny, in 1970. He was born into a large family, with three brothers and three sisters. One of his sisters, Catriona Carey, was a member of the Ireland women's national field hockey team, as well as being part of the Kilkenny senior camogie team. His brother, Martin Carey, was also a member of the Kilkenny hurling panel as a substitute goalkeeper for a number of years. Several members of Carey's extended family have also played hurling and camogie. His aunt, Peggy Carey, won four All-Ireland camogie titles with Kilkenny and his granduncle, Paddy Phelan, was an inter-county hurler of the 1930s and was selected on the GAA Hurling Team of the Century and the GAA Team of The Millennium.

Carey's private life, involving his wife and two children, had long been the subject of intense media scrutiny and rumour. News of the breakdown of his seven-year marriage hit the headlines shortly before the All-Ireland final in 2003 although Carey and his wife had been separated for more than a year. A year later Carey spoke for the first time about the marriage break-down and of finding new love with British-born millionaire Sarah Newman, who was herself a celebrity and starred on the television series Dragons' Den. Carey and Newman separated in 2012.

== Controversy and criminal proceedings ==
Carey began a number of business ventures after retiring, including D.J. Carey Enterprises. Based in his home village of Gowran, it was a wholesale company selling hygiene products to other businesses. His former partner Sarah Newman, who was a director of DJ Carey Enterprises, called in auditors in 2012, and a series of discrepancies were found. Around this time, two of his other businesses collapsed with major losses to creditors. D.J. Carey Enterprises was dissolved in 2016. In 2017, Carey's debts of over €9.5m were written down to €60,000.

In 2017, Allied Irish Banks (AIB) reportedly agreed to write down a €9.5 million debt associated with Carey. AIB, which was majority state-owned at the time, was asked to speak to an Oireachtas committee about the arrangement in early 2023. Bank transfers, made to Carey in 2020 by his sister Caitriona (who had previously worked at the same business), were also reputedly the subject of "Garda scrutiny" in early 2023.

In July 2025, Carey pleaded guilty in Dublin Circuit Criminal Court to ten counts of deception, admitting that he fraudulently claimed to have cancer between 2014 and 2022 in order to induce at least 12 people — including billionaire Denis O’Brien — to donate money allegedly for treatment. He had originally faced 21 charges, including two counts involving false instruments; one count was struck out and the remainder taken into consideration during sentencing. Appearing impassive in court dressed in a dark suit, Carey pleaded “guilty” to each count, while his defence counsel noted that he had serious health issues, including undergoing heart surgery in 2024, as well as psychological distress, and requested preparation of medical and psychological reports. He was granted continuing bail and his sentencing hearing was scheduled for 29 October 2025. The total amount defrauded was not disclosed, though victim Noel Tynan described donating €10,000 after believing Carey’s illness. Irish media highlighted that Carey’s conviction marked a dramatic fall from grace for one of hurling’s most iconic and celebrated figures. On 3 November 2025, Carey was sentenced to five-and-a-half years in prison for his crimes.

== Playing career ==
=== St Kieran's College ===
Carey first came to prominence as a hurler with St Kieran's College in Kilkenny. He played in every grade of hurling before joining the college's senior hurling team as a 16-year-old. On 22 March 1987, Carey was listed amongst the substitutes when St. Kieran's College faced Birr Community School in the Leinster final. He was introduced as a substitute and collected a winners' medal following the 4–08 to 3–09 victory. On 10 May 1987, Carey lined out at right corner-forward when St Kieran's College played St Flannan's College from Ennis in the All-Ireland final. He scored a point from play but ended on the losing side following a 4–11 to 1–07 defeat.

On 27 March 1988, Carey lined out at right corner-forward when St Kieran's College faced Enniscorthy CBS in the Leinster final. He claimed a second successive winners' medal after scoring 2–05 in the 8–17 to 1–06 victory. Carey retained his position at right corner-forward for the All-Ireland final on 8 May 1988. He scored two points from play and claimed his first All-Ireland medal after a 3–10 to 2–07 defeat of Midleton CBS.

Carey lined out in a third successive Leinster final on 15 April 1989. He scored 1-05 from full-forward in the 1-07 apiece draw with Birr Community School. Carey retained the full-forward position for the replay on 23 April 1989 but was limited to just a point from play in the 2–11 to 1–09 victory. On 8 May 1989, he lined out in a third successive All-Ireland final. Carey received a pain-killing injection just before the match but scored 3-03 and collected a second successive winners' medal following the 3–05 to 1–09 defeat of St Flannan's College.

=== Young Irelands ===
Carey joined the Young Irelands club at a young age and played in all grades at juvenile and underage levels. He became a regular member of the club's top adult team during the 1988 Kilkenny Intermediate Hurling Championship.

On 24 September 1989, Carey was just 18-years-old when he played in his first Kilkenny Intermediate Championship final. Lining out in goal he ended the game on the losing side following a 2–13 to 0–14 defeat by Mullinavat.

Carey lined out in a second Kilkenny Intermediate Championship final on 27 October 1991, however, by now he was lining out at centre-forward. He scored 1-02, including a goal from a penalty, in the 4–09 to 2–08 defeat by Dicksboro.

On 18 October 1992, Carey lined out in a second successive Kilkenny Intermediate Championship final - his third overall. Selected to play at full-forward, he suffered concussion after a heavy knock late in the first half but remained on the field until he was substituted in the 54th minute. Carey ended the game with a winners' medal after the 2–12 to 1–07 defeat of Conahy Shamrocks.

Carey was appointed captain of the Young Irelands senior team for the 1996 Kilkenny Senior Championship. On 6 October 1996, he captained the team to the final against James Stephens. Carey was the game's top scorer with 1–05 in the 2–10 to 0–16 draw. The replay on 20 October 1996 saw Carey top score with 2-04 and claim a winners' medal after a 3–09 to 2–10 victory.

On 12 October 1997, Carey lined out in a second successive Kilkenny Senior Championship final. He ended the game as the top scorer with 1-02, however, Young Irelands suffered a 2–10 to 2–07 defeat by Dunnamaggin. Carey ended the championship as the top scorer with 3-16 from three games.

Carey lined out in a third Kilkenny Senior Championship final on 27 October 2002. He ended the game with a second winners' medal after top scoring with 2–07 in the 3–14 to 1–15 defeat of Dunnamaggin. Carey was also the championship's top scorer with 5-19 from three games. On 1 December 2002, he scored a point from a free when Young Irelands suffered a 2–05 to 1–02 defeat by Birr in the Leinster final.

On 26 October 2003, Carey was at full-forward when Young Irelands lined out against O'Loughlin Gaels in the Kilkenny Senior Championship final. He top scored for the team with 1–03 in the 2–12 to 3–09 draw with O'Loughlin Gaels. Carey was again at full-forward for the replay on 2 November 2003 and was the game's joint top scorer with 1–07 in the 2–12 to 2–10 defeat.

Carey made his fifth Kilkenny Senior Championship final appearance on 31 October 2004 when Young Irelands lined out against James Stephens. He top scored with 3-06 but ended the game on the losing side after the 2–16 to 3–12 defeat. Carey ended the championship as the top scorer with 5-35 from five games.

On 6 October 2007, Carey lined out in his last senior game for Young Irelands. He top scored for the team with six points in the 1–11 to 0–13 defeat of Mullinavat in a relegation play-off at Nowlan Park.

After four years away from the club scene Carey returned as a member of the Young Irelands junior team. He began as a goalkeeper before taking up his more regular position in the full-forward line.

=== Kilkenny ===
==== Minor and under-21 ====
After narrowly missing out on a place on the Kilkenny minor hurling team in 1987, Carey was added to the team in advance of the 1988 Leinster Championship. He made his debut on 25 May 1988 and scored 1-03 from left corner-forward in Kilkenny's 1–18 to 2–07 defeat of Dublin. Carey again lined out at left corner-forward when Kilkenny faced Offaly in the Leinster final. He was held scoreless from play but ended the game with a winners' medal after a 2–16 to 0–06 victory. On 4 September 1988, Carey scored 1-02 from left corner-forward when Kilkenny defeated Cork by 3–13 to 0–12 in the All-Ireland final.

Carey was drafted onto the Kilkenny under-21 team for the 1990 Leinster Championship. He made his first appearance for the team on 1 July 1990 when he scored two goals in Kilkenny's 4–11 to 1–09 defeat of Offaly. On 15 July 1990, Carey won a Leinster Championship medal after top scoring with 1-04 from left corner-forward in Kilkenny's 2–09 to 1–10 defeat of Laois in the final. He was switched to right corner-forward for the All-Ireland final against Tipperary on 9 September 1990. Carey scored 1-01 from play and ended the game with a winners' medal after the 2–11 to 1–11 victory.

On 7 August 1991, Carey lined out in a second successive Leinster final. He top scored for Kilkenny with five points, however, he ended the game on the losing side following a 2–10 to 0–12 defeat by Offaly. It was Carey's last game in the under-21 grade.

==== Senior ====
Having just graduated from the minor grade, Carey was added to the Kilkenny senior team during the 1988-89 National League. He made his senior debut on 19 February 1989 when he lined out in goal in Kilkenny's 0–13 to 1–08 defeat of Offaly. Carey was later included as sub-goalkeeper to Kevin Fennelly for the 1989.

Carey's tenure as a goalkeeper ended during the 1989-90 National League when he was switched to an outfield player. He made his first appearance as a forward on 15 October 1989 when he scored 0–10 in Kilkenny's 0–20 to 2–08 defeat of Antrim. On 22 April 1990, Carey scored 1-04 from play when Kilkenny defeated Wexford by 3–12 to 1–10 in the National League home final. He ended the campaign with a National League medal after top scoring with 0–10 in Kilkenny's 0–18 to 0–09 defeat of New York in the final proper, while he was also the league's top scorer with 1-52. Carey made his Leinster Championship debut on 17 June 1990 in a 4–15 to 1–08 defeat by Offaly in the semi-final.

On 21 July 1991, Carey lined out in his Leinster final. He scored five points from right wing-forward and collected a winners' medal following the 1–13 to 1–11 defeat of Dublin. Carey was switched to left wing-forward for the All-Ireland final against Tipperary on 1 September 1990. Carey lined out in a second successive Leinster final on 5 July 1990. He ended the game with a second winners' medal after top scoring with 1–06 in the 3–16 to 2–09 defeat of Wexford. On 6 September 1992, Carey lined out at left wing-forward when Kilkenny faced Cork in the All-Ireland final. He was the game's top scorer with 1-04, including a first-half goal from a penalty, and collected his first All-Ireland medal after the 3–10 to 1–12 victory. Carey was later presented with a second consecutive All-Star award.

On 11 July 1993, Carey scored five points when Kilkenny drew 2–14 to 1–17 with Wexford in the Leinster final. He top scored with 1–05 in the replay a week later and claimed a third successive Leinster Championship medal after the 2–12 to 0–11 victory. On 5 September 1993, Carey lined out at left wing-forward in a third successive All-Ireland final. He scored four points in the 2–17 to 1–15 defeat of Galway and claimed a second successive All-Ireland medal. Carey ended the season by winning a third successive All-Star award while he was also selected as the Texaco Hurler of the Year.

Carey ended Kilkenny's unsuccessful 1994 Leinster Championship campaign as the team's top scorer with 2-08 from two games. In spite of exiting the championship at the provincial semi-final stage Carey ended the season with a fourth consecutive All-Star award.

On 7 May 1995, Carey lined out in his first National League final since 1990. He was held scoreless at full-forward but ended the game with a second league winners' medal after a 2–12 to 0–09 defeat of Clare. On 16 July 1995, Carey top scored with two goals when Kilkenny suffered a 2–16 to 2–05 defeat by Offaly in the Leinster final. He was later presented with a fifth consecutive All-Star award.

Carey was appointed captain of the Kilkenny senior team for the 1997 season. He lined out in a fifth Leinster final on 13 July 1997, however, he ended the game on the losing side after a 2–14 to 1–11 defeat by Wexford. Carey ended the season as the championship's top scorer with 4-22, while he also claimed a sixth All-Star award.

On 4 February 1998, rumours of Carey's imminent retirement shocked the hurling world when they began circulating in the national media. He later confirmed his retirement from club and inter-county hurling in an interview on RTÉ Radio citing a loss of "appetite" for the game as his primary reason. Over the following few weeks, Carey received 25,000 letters from all over the country encouraging him not to retire. On 20 March 1998, he reversed his decision and announced that he would be returning to hurling at the end of the month. On 5 July 1998, Carey lined out in his sixth Leinster final. He scored 2-01 from play and collected a fourth winners' medal after a 3–10 to 1–11 defeat of Offaly. On 13 September 1998, Carey lined out at right wing-forward when Kilkenny once again faced Offaly in the All-Ireland final. He top scored for Kilkenny with five points, however, he ended on the losing side following a 2–16 to 1–13 defeat.

On 11 July 1999, Carey won his fifth Leinster Championship medal after a 5–14 to 1–16 defeat of Offaly in the final. He ended the game as the top scorer with 2–04 with all bar two points coming from play. On 12 September 1999, Carey was selected at right wing-forward when Kilkenny qualified for a first All-Ireland final-meeting with Cork in seven years. He was held scoreless throughout the game which Kilkenny lost by 0–13 to 0–12. Carey was later presented with a seventh All-Star award.

After making just one appearance during the 2000 National League, Carey lined out in a seventh Leinster final on 9 July 2000. He scored 1-03 from full-forward and claimed a fifth winners' medal after a 2–21 to 1–13 defeat of Offaly. Carey made his sixth All-Ireland final appearance on 10 September 2000, with Offaly once again providing the opposition. Kilkenny's full-forward line of Carey, Charlie Carter and Henry Shefflin scored 4-10 between them, with Carey top scoring with 2-04 and claiming a third All-Ireland medal after the 5–15 to 1–14 victory. He ended the season by winning an eighth All-Star award while he was also selected as Hurler of the Year for the second time in his career.

On 8 July 2001, Carey made his eighth appearance in a Leinster final. Lining out at full-forward he scored a goal in the 2–19 to 0–12 defeat of Wexford and collected a seventh winners' medal.

Carey was ruled out of the 2002 National League after being involved in a car accident which caused him to suffer serious neck and shoulder injuries. He also went an operation to remove his appendix. Carey's career looked to be over when he was also ruled out of the Leinster Championship, however, he returned to the starting fifteen for the first time in twelve months for Kilkenny's 1–20 to 1–16 defeat of Tipperary in the All-Ireland semi-final. On 8 September 2002, Carey lined out at left corner-forward when Kilkenny faced Clare in the All-Ireland final. He ended the game after scoring 1-06 and claimed a fourth All-Ireland medal following the 2–20 to 0–19 victory. Carey ended the season by winning a record ninth All-Star award.

On 5 May 2003, Carey won a third National League medal after scoring 1-03, including three points from frees, in Kilkenny's 5--14 to 5–13 defeat of Tipperary in the final. The departure of Charlie Carter from the team at the start of the Leinster Championship saw Carey assume the captaincy of the team for the second time in his career. On 6 July 2003, he won his ninth Leinster Championship medal - his eighth on the field of play - after scoring three points in the 2–23 to 2–12 defeat of Wexford in the final. On 7 September 2003, Carey captained Kilkenny to an All-Ireland final appearance against Cork, however, on the morning of the game details of his recent marital breakdown made the front page of a national newspaper. The notion that the marriage of an amateur sportsman should be held up for public scrutiny shocked many. Carey was held scoreless from right corner-forward but the 1–14 to 1–11 victory allowed him to collect a fifth All-Ireland medal while he also had the honour of lifting the Liam MacCarthy Cup as captain.

On 12 September 2004, Carey made his ninth All-Ireland final appearance when he lined out at left wing-forward against Cork. For the third time in his career and for the second year in succession he was held scoreless in a final against Cork as Kilkenny suffered a 0–17 to 0–09 defeat.

On 2 May 2005, Carey won a fourth National League medal after scoring 1-02 from full-forward in Kilkenny's 3–20 to 0–15 defeat of Clare in the final. On 7 July 2005, he won a 10th Leinster Championship medal, albeit as an unused substitute, following Kilkenny's 0–22 to 1–16 defeat of Wexford in the final. Carey was beck in the starting fifteen at full-forward for Kilkenny's 5–18 to 4–18 defeat by Galway in the All-Ireland semi-final on 21 August 2005. It was his last game for Kilkenny. Carey announced his retirement from inter-county hurling on 1 June 2006.

=== Leinster ===
Carey was first selected for the Leinster inter-provincial team during the 1991 Railway Cup. He made his first appearance for the team on 10 March 1991 when he scored a goal in Leinster's 1–10 to 2–19 defeat by Munster at the semi-final stage.

After being selected for the team again in 1992, Carey scored two points when Leinster suffered a second successive semi-final defeat by Munster. On 15 March 1992, he scored three points when Leinster defeated Connacht by 3–09 to 0–15 in the secondary Railway Shield competition.

On 7 November 1993, Carey lined out at full-forward when Leinster faced Ulster in the Railway Cup final. He scored four points from play and collected a winners' medal following the 1–15 to 2–06 victory.

For the fourth successive year Carey was included on the Leinster team for the 1994 Railway Cup. On 20 February 1994, he lined out in a second successive final, however, he ended the game on the losing side following a 1–11 to 1–10 defeat by Connacht.

On 18 March 1996, Carey was selected at left wing-forward when Leinster qualified to play Munster in the Railway Cup final. He was limited to just a point from a free as Munster won the game by 2–20 to 0–10.

After a one-year absence from the team, Carey was again back on the Leinster starting fifteen for the 1998 Railway Cup. He won a second Railway Cup medal on 22 November 1998 when he lined out at right corner-forward in Leinster's 0–16 to 2–09 defeat of Connacht.

On 12 November 2000, Carey played in a fifth Railway Cup final. Lining out at full-forward and flanked by his Kilkenny teammates Charlie Carter and Henry Shefflin, he scored four points in the 3–15 to 2–15 defeat by Munster.

== Managerial career ==
=== Institute of Technology, Carlow ===
In October 2013, Carey was appointed Ambassador for Hurling and senior team manager at the Institute of Technology, Carlow. On 25 October 2017, he guided IT Carlow to the final of the Fitzgibbon Cup for the first time in their history. Carey's side suffered a 3–24 to 1–19 defeat by reigning champions Mary Immaculate College.

=== Leinster ===
Carey was added to Johnny Dooley's management team as a selector with the Leinster inter-provincial team in advance of the 2014 Railway Cup. On 1 March 2014, he helped guide Leinster to a 1–23 to 0–16 defeat of Connacht to secure the Railway Cup title.

=== Kilkenny ===
==== Under-21/under-20 ====
Carey succeeded Eddie Brennan as manager of the Kilkenny under-21 hurling team on 9 October 2017. In his opening game in charge on 20 June 2018, Kilkenny were knocked out of the Leinster Championship by Galway after a 3–13 to 1–17 defeat at the semi-final stage.

A change to the age limit in the championship saw Carey being appointed manager of the new Kilkenny under-20 hurling team on 10 September 2018. After victories over Laois and Galway, he guided Kilkenny to the Leinster Championship title on 17 July 2019 after a 1–17 to 0–18 defeat of Wexford in the final.

==== Senior ====
On 14 October 2019, Carey was ratified as a selector to the Kilkenny senior hurling team under Brian Cody. In January 2021, he left his role as a selector on the team.

== Career statistics ==
=== Club ===
| Team | Year | Kilkenny | | Leinster | | Total | |
| Team | Year | Apps | Score | Apps | Score | Apps | Score |
|---|---|---|---|---|---|---|---|
| Young Irelands | 1993 | 2 | 3-10 | — | | 2 | 3-10 |
| Young Irelands | 1994 | 2 | 0-01 | — | | 2 | 0-01 |
| Young Irelands | 1995 | 1 | 3-01 | — | | 1 | 3-01 |
| Young Irelands | 1996 | 5 | 5-25 | 1 | 0-02 | 6 | 5-27 |
| Young Irelands | 1997 | 3 | 3-16 | — | | 3 | 3-16 |
| Young Irelands | 1998 | 1 | 0-01 | — | | 1 | 0-01 |
| Young Irelands | 1999 | 2 | 1-04 | — | | 2 | 1-04 |
| Young Irelands | 2000 | 1 | 1-03 | — | | 1 | 1-03 |
| Young Irelands | 2001 | 1 | 1-01 | — | | 1 | 1-01 |
| Young Irelands | 2002 | 3 | 5-19 | 3 | 4-10 | 6 | 9-29 |
| Young Irelands | 2003 | 4 | 3-18 | — | | 4 | 3-18 |
| Young Irelands | 2004 | 5 | 5-35 | — | | 5 | 5-35 |
| Young Irelands | 2005 | 2 | 1-10 | — | | 2 | 1-10 |
| Young Irelands | 2006 | 1 | 0-01 | — | | 1 | 0-01 |
| Young Irelands | 2007 | 2 | 1-08 | — | | 2 | 1-08 |
| Total | | 35 | 32-153 | 4 | 4-12 | 39 | 36-165 |

=== Inter-county ===
| Team | Year | National League | | | Leinster | | All-Ireland | | Total | |
| Team | Year | Division | Apps | Score | Apps | Score | Apps | Score | Apps | Score |
|---|---|---|---|---|---|---|---|---|---|---|
| Kilkenny | 1988-89 | Division 1 | 2 | 0-00 | 0 | 0-00 | 0 | 0-00 | 2 | 0-00 |
| Kilkenny | 1989-90 | Division 1 | 9 | 1-52 | 1 | 0-01 | 0 | 0-00 | 10 | 1-53 |
| Kilkenny | 1990-91 | Division 1 | 5 | 3-23 | 2 | 1-10 | 2 | 0-17 | 9 | 4-50 |
| Kilkenny | 1991-92 | Division 1 | 3 | 1-05 | 2 | 2-12 | 2 | 1-11 | 7 | 4-28 |
| Kilkenny | 1992-93 | Division 1 | 2 | 0-03 | 4 | 4-14 | 2 | 2-09 | 8 | 6-26 |
| Kilkenny | 1993-94 | Division 2 | 8 | 1-19 | 2 | 2-08 | 0 | 0-00 | 10 | 3-27 |
| Kilkenny | 1994-95 | Division 1 | 8 | 6-10 | 3 | 2-04 | 0 | 0-00 | 11 | 8-14 |
| Kilkenny | 1995-96 | Division 1 | 7 | 0-26 | 1 | 0-01 | 0 | 0-00 | 8 | 0-27 |
| Kilkenny | 1997 | Division 1 | 9 | 5-43 | 2 | 1-08 | 2 | 3-14 | 13 | 9-65 |
| Kilkenny | 1998 | Division 1B | 2 | 0-07 | 3 | 3-12 | 2 | 0-10 | 7 | 3-29 |
| Kilkenny | 1999 | Division 1B | 6 | 2-11 | 2 | 4-07 | 2 | 1-03 | 10 | 7-21 |
| Kilkenny | 2000 | Division 1B | 1 | 1-03 | 2 | 1-04 | 2 | 2-06 | 5 | 4-13 |
| Kilkenny | 2001 | Division 1B | 3 | 1-05 | 2 | 1-01 | 1 | 1-01 | 6 | 3-07 |
| Kilkenny | 2002 | Division 1A | 0 | 0-00 | 0 | 0-00 | 2 | 1-10 | 2 | 1-10 |
| Kilkenny | 2003 | Division 1A | 5 | 4-12 | 2 | 0-05 | 2 | 0-03 | 9 | 4-20 |
| Kilkenny | 2004 | Division 1A | 5 | 2-14 | 1 | 0-01 | 6 | 0-11 | 12 | 2-26 |
| Kilkenny | 2005 | Division 1A | 6 | 2-14 | 1 | 1-02 | 2 | 0-03 | 9 | 3-19 |
| Total | | | 81 | 29-247 | 30 | 22-90 | 27 | 11-98 | 138 | 62-435 |

== Honours ==
=== Team ===
St Kieran's College

- All-Ireland Colleges Senior Hurling Championship (2): 1988, 1989
- Leinster Colleges Senior Hurling Championship (3): 1987, 1988, 1989

Young Irelands

- Kilkenny Senior Hurling Championship (2): 1996 (c), 2002
- Kilkenny Intermediate Hurling Championship (1): 1992

Kilkenny

- All-Ireland Senior Hurling Championship (5): 1992, 1993, 2000, 2002, 2003 (c)
- Leinster Senior Hurling Championship (10): 1991, 1992, 1993, 1998, 1999, 2000, 2001, 2002, 2003 (c), 2005
- National Hurling League (4): 1989-90, 1994-95, 2003, 2005
- Leinster Junior Hurling Championship (1): 1989
- All-Ireland Under-21 Hurling Championship (1): 1990
- Leinster Under-21 Hurling Championship (1): 1990
- All-Ireland Minor Hurling Championship (1): 1988
- Leinster Minor Hurling Championship (1): 1988

Leinster

- Railway Cup (2): 1993, 1998

=== Individual ===
- Kilkenny Hurling Team of the Century: Left wing-forward
- Leinster Hurling Team of the Last 25 Years (1984-2009): Full-forward
- Supreme All-Star Hurling Team: Left wing-forward
- All-Star Hurler of the Year (1): 2000
- Texaco Hurler of the Year (2): 1993, 2000
- All-Star Awards (9): 1991, 1992, 1993, 1994, 1995, 1997, 1999, 2000, 2002
- All-Ireland Senior Hurling Championship final man of the match (1): 2000
- In May 2020, a public poll conducted by RTÉ.ie named Carey in the half-forward line alongside Henry Shefflin and Joe Canning in a team of hurlers who had won All Stars during the era of The Sunday Game.
- Also in May 2020, the Irish Independent named Carey at number two in its "Top 20 hurlers in Ireland over the past 50 years".

=== Management ===
Kilkenny

- Leinster Under-20 Hurling Championship (1): 2019

Leinster

- Railway Cup (1): 2014

Awards
| Preceded by Brian Corcoran (Cork) | Texaco Hurler of the Year; 1993 | Succeeded by Brian Whelahan (Offaly) |
| Preceded by Brian Corcoran (Cork) | Eircell Hurler of the Year; 2000 | Succeeded by Tommy Dunne (Tipperary) |
| Preceded by Brian Corcoran (Cork) | Texaco Hurler of the Year; 2000 | Succeeded by Tommy Dunne (Tipperary) |
Achievements
| Preceded by Andy Comerford (Kilkenny) | All-Ireland SHC winning captain 2003 | Succeeded by Ben O'Connor (Cork) |
Sporting positions
| Preceded by Tom Hickey | Kilkenny Senior Hurling Captain; 1997 | Succeeded by Michael Phelan |
| Preceded by Charlie Carter | Kilkenny Senior Hurling Captain; 2003 | Succeeded by Martin Comerford |
| Preceded by Eddie Brennan | Kilkenny Under-20 Hurling Manager; 2017–2019 | Succeeded by Derek Lyng |
