= Martin Carey (hurler) =

Irish hurler

Personal information
- Native name: Máirtín Ó Ciardha (Irish)
- Born: 30 June 1974 (age 52) Gowran, County Kilkenny, Ireland
- Occupation: Car dealership owner
- Height: 5 ft 10 in (178 cm)

Sport
- Sport: Hurling
- Position: Goalkeeper
Club
- Years: Club
- Young Irelands
Club titles
- Kilkenny titles: 2
Inter-county
Years	County	Apps (scores)
1996-2000	Kilkenny	0 (0-00)
Inter-county titles
- Leinster titles: 3
- All-Irelands: 1
- NHL: 0
- All Stars: 0

Martin Carey (born 30 June 1974) is an Irish hurler who played as a goalkeeper for the Kilkenny senior team.

== Biography ==
A brother of D. J. Carey, he joined the Kilkenny senior team during the 1995-96 National League and was a regular member of the team until his retirement from inter-county hurling after four seasons. An All-Ireland medalist in the minor and under-21 grades, Carey won a senior All-Ireland winners' medal as a substitute. Martin Carey also won 2 Leinster Senior Colleges; 2 All-Ireland Senior Colleges; 1 Minor All-Ireland; 3 Leinster Under 21; 1 All-Ireland Under 21.

At club level, Carey is a two-time Kilkenny senior club championship medalist with the Young Irelands club.
