= Bill Hennessy (Kilkenny hurler) =

Irish hurler

Personal information
- Native name: Liam Ó hAonasa (Irish)
- Born: 13 May 1968 (age 58) Tullaroan, County Kilkenny, Ireland
- Occupation: Electrician
- Height: 5 ft 10 in (178 cm)

Sport
- Sport: Hurling
- Position: Right corner-back
Club
- Years: Club
- Tullaroan
Club titles
- Kilkenny titles: 1
Inter-county
- Years: County
- 1989-1996: Kilkenny
Inter-county titles
- Leinster titles: 3
- All-Irelands: 2
- NHL: 2
- All Stars: 0

William Hennessy (born 13 May 1968) is an Irish former hurler. At club level he played with Tullaroan and was also a member of the Kilkenny senior hurling team. After beginning his career at wing-back he later lined out at midfield.

== Career ==
Hennessy first came to prominence at juvenile and underage levels with the Tullaroan club before eventually joining the club's top adult team. He enjoyed his first success in 1988 when Tullaroan won the County Intermediate Championship before claiming the County Senior Championship title in 1994. Hennessy first appeared on the inter-county scene with the Kilkenny under-21 team that suffered All-Ireland final defeat by Cork in 1988. This success saw him drafted on to the Kilkenny senior hurling team in 1989. Hennessy would go on to line out in three consecutive All-Ireland finals at senior level and, after defeat by Tipperary in 1991, claimed consecutive winners' medals against Cork in 1992 and Galway in 1993. His other honours include two National League titles and three consecutive Leinster Championship medals. After leaving the panel with the intention of emigrating, Hennessy was recalled for one final season in 1996.

== Honours ==
=== Team ===
Tullaroan

- Kilkenny Senior Hurling Championship: 1994
- Kilkenny Intermediate Hurling Championship: 1988

Kilkenny

- All-Ireland Senior Hurling Championship: 1992, 1993
- Leinster Senior Hurling Championship: 1991, 1992, 1993
- National Hurling League: 1989-90, 1994-95
- Leinster Under-21 Hurling Championship: 1988

=== Individual ===
Awards

- Tullaroan Hurling Team of the Century: Right corner-back
