= 1994–95 National Hurling League =

64th season of the National Hurling League

League details
- Dates: 8 October 1994 – 7 May 1995
- Teams: 33

League champions
- Winners: Kilkenny (9th win)
- Captain: Bill Hennessy
- Manager: Ollie Walsh

League runners-up
- Runners-up: Clare
- Captain: Anthony Daly
- Manager: Ger Loughnane

Other division winners
- Division 2: Waterford
- Division 3: Westmeath
- Division 4: Fermanagh

The 1994–95 National Hurling League, known for sponsorship reasons as the Church & General National Hurling League for Church & General (later acquired by Allianz), was the 64th edition of the National Hurling League, which ran from 8 October 1994 until 7 May 1995.

Kilkenny won the league, beating Clare by 2–12 to 0–9 in the final.

== Structure ==
There are eight teams in each division. Each plays each other team once, home or away, and receives two points for a win and one for a draw.

The top two teams in Division 1 advance to the semi-finals. The third- and fourth-placed teams in Division 1 go into the quarter-finals, as do the top two teams in Division 2.

The top two teams in Divisions 2, 3 and 4 are promoted for the following season. The bottom two in Divisions 1, 2 and 3 are relegated.

== Division 1 ==
National Hurling League Division 1
- Season: 1994-95
- Champions: Kilkenny; 9th National League title Captain: Bill Hennessy; Manager: Ollie Walsh
- Relegated: Antrim; Laois; Limerick
- Matches: 33
- Top goalscorer: Michael Cleary (3-34)
- Biggest home win: Tipperary 2-13 - 0-5 Laois (26 March 1995)
- Biggest away win: Laois 1-9 - 3-17 Galway (9 October 1994)
- Highest scoring: Laois 1-9 - 3-17 Galway (9 October 1994)
- All statistics correct as of 19 February 2017.

Tipperary came into the season as defending champions of the 1993-94 season. Clare and Kilkenny joined Division 1 as the promoted teams.

On 7 May 1995, Kilkenny won the title after a 2-12 to 0-9 win over Clare in the final. It was their 9th league title overall and their first since 1989-90.

Antrim, Laois and Limerick were relegated from Division 1.

Tipperary's Michael Cleary was the Division 1 top scorer with 3-34.

=== Table ===
Pos	Team	Pld	W	D	L	Diff	Pts	Notes
1	Clare	7	6	0	1	40	12	National Hurling League runners-up
2	Kilkenny	7	5	0	2	22	10	National Hurling League champions
3	Cork	7	4	1	2	19	9	
4	Galway	7	4	1	2	15	9	
5	Tipperary	7	3	0	4	7	6	
6	Limerick	7	2	1	4	-19	5	Relegated to Division 2
7	Laois	7	1	1	5	-62	3	Relegated to Division 2
8	Antrim	7	0	2	5	-24	2	Relegated to Division 2

=== Group stage ===
9 October 1994	Tipperary	2-14 - 1-7	Antrim	Semple Stadium, Thurles
	C Stakelum 1-1, B O'Meara 1-0, P Fox 0-3, M Cleary 0-3, M Kinsella 0-2, D Ryan 0-2, L McGrath 0-1, C McIntyre 0-1, A Butler 0-1.		S McMullen 1-0, J Connolly 0-2, A Elliott 0-2, C McCambridge 0-1, JP McKillop 0-1, M Carlin 0-1.	Referee: P Horan (Offaly)

9 October 1994	Cork	0-18 - 1-8	Limerick	Páirc Uí Rinn, Cork
	B Cunningham 0-7, K Murray 0-3, B Corcoran 0-3, B Egan 0-2, M Mullins 0-1, P Kenneally 0-1, A Browne 0-1.		G Kirby 1-6, TJ Ryan 0-1, F Carroll 0-1.

9 October 1994	Laois	1-9 - 3-17	Galway	O'Moore Park, Portlaoise
	D Cuddy 1-0, F Lawlor 0-5, N Delaney 0-2, PJ Peacock 0-1, L Tynan 0-1.		L Burke 0-9, D Curley 1-1, J Campbell 1-1, F Forde 1-1, O Fahy 0-3, M Coleman 0-1, C O'Doherty 0-1.	Referee: J McDonald (Tipperary)

9 October 1994	Clare	0-14 - 0-9	Kilkenny	O'Garney Park, Sixmilebridge
	C Lyons 0-3, A Daly 0-3, PJ O'Connell 0-2, J O'Connor 0-2, E Taaffe 0-2, J McInerney 0-2.		C Brennan 0-3, E Morrissey 0-3, M Phelan 0-1, A Ronan 0-1, C carter 0-1.	Referee: S O'Meara (Offaly)

23 October 1994	Kilkenny	1-14 - 0-6	Laois	Nowlan Park, Kilkenny
	D Gaffney 1-0, A Ronan 0-3, M Dunphy 0-2, B O'Keeffe 0-2, C Brennan 0-2, E Morrissey 0-2, D Byrne 0-1, DJ Carey 0-1, C Carter 0-1.		PJ Peacock 0-3, D Cuddy 0-1, G Norton 0-1, F O'Sullivan 0-1.	Referee: P O'Connor (Limerick)

23 October 1994	Galway	1-10 - 3-12	Clare	Kenny Park, Athenry
	D Curely 1-0, F Forde 0-2, D Fahy 0-2, O Fahy 0-2, M Coleman 0-1, P Malone 0-1, D Coen 0-1, J Campbell 0-1.		J McInerney 2-2, C Lyons 0-7, C Clancy 1-0, PJ O'Connell 0-1, J O'Connor 0-1, O Baker 0-1.	Referee: W Barrett (Tipperary)

23 October 1994	Limerick	2-9 - 1-15	Tipperary	Gaelic Grounds, Limerick
	P Heffernan 2-1, G Kirby 0-5, TJ Ryan 0-1, F Carroll 0-1, C Carey 0-1.		M Cleary 1-8, T Lanigan 0-3, J Leahy 0-2, C Stakelum 0-1, L McGrath 0-1.	Referee: P Delaney (Laois)

23 October 1994	Antrim	3-9 - 2-12	Cork	Casement Park, Belfast
	B McGarry 1-2, S McMullen 1-1, SP McKillop 1-0, A Elliott 0-2, G O'Kane 0-1, N Elliott 0-1, T McNaughton 0-1, Conor McCambridge 0-1.		B Cunningham 2-3, B Egan 0-2, K Murray 0-2, B Sheehan 0-2, A Browne 0-1, K Egan 0-1, D O'Donoghue 0-1.	Referee: A Mac Suibhne (Dublin)

6 November 1994	Tipperary	1-10 - 2-12	Kilkenny	Semple Stadium, Thurles
	M Cleary 0-5, C Stakelum 1-1, D Bourke 0-1, D Ryan 0-1, L McGrath 0-1, B Gaynor 0-1.		A Ronan 0-5, DJ Carey 1-1, D Gaffney 1-1, PJ Delaney 0-3, L Keoghan 0-1, D Byrne 0-1.	Referee: A Mac Suibhne (Dublin)

6 November 1994	Galway	0-15 - 2-8	Cork	Ballinasloe Sportsfield, Ballinasloe
	C Moran 0-7, L Burke 0-3, D Curley 0-2, D Fahy 0-1, J Rabbitte 0-1, O Fahy 0-1.		B Egan 0-4, A Browne 1-0, G Manley 1-0, B Cunningham 0-2, K Murray 0-2.	Referee: P Delaney (Laois)

6 November 1994	Laois	1-6 - 1-6	Limerick	O'Moore Park, Portlaoise
	N Delaney 1-0, D Cuddy 0-3, F O'Sullivan 0-1, PJ Peacock 0-1, G Norton 0-1.		M Foley 1-0, G Hegarty 0-2, TJ Ryan 0-1, F Carroll 0-1, P Heffernan 0-1, L O'Connor 0-1.	Referee: W Barrett (Tipperary)

6 November 1994	Clare	2-8 - 1-6	Antrim	O'Garney Park, Sixmilebridge
	C Lyons 1-3, C Clancy 1-2, J O'Connor 0-1, B Quinn 0-1, PJ O'Connell 0-1.		G O'Kane 1-0, Conor McCambridge 0-3, SP McKillop 0-1, A Elliott 0-1, B McGarry 0-1.	Referee: P Horan (Offaly)

20 November 1994	Limerick	1-8 - 2-8	Clare	Gaelic Grounds, Limerick
	G Kirby 0-4, S O'Neill 1-0, D Quigley 0-1, TJ Ryan 0-1, D Nash 0-1, F Carroll 0-1.		C Clancy 1-1, G O'Loughlin 1-1, A Daly 0-2, V Donnellan 0-1, PJ O'Connell 0-1, J McInenrey 0-1, C Lyons 0-1.	Referee: A Mac Suibhne (Dublin)

20 November 1994	Galway	1-13 - 0-11	Tipperary	Ballinasloe Sportsfield, Ballinasloe
	O Fahy 1-4, D Curley 0-2, C Moran 0-2, J Rabbitte 0-2, L Burke 0-1, M Coleman 0-1, F Forde 0-1.		M Cleary 0-4, D Burke 0-4, P Fox 0-2, T Lanigan 0-1.	Referee: T Murray (Limerick)

20 November 1994	Antrim	1-11 - 2-11	Laois	Casement Park, Belfast
	P Jennings 0-5, S McMullen 1-1, B McGarry 0-2, Gregory O'Kane 0-1, J Carson 0-1, C McGuckian 0-1.		D Cuddy 0-5, T Kenna 1-1, D Conroy 1-0, F O'Sullivan 0-2, D Rooney 0-1, O Dowling 0-1, J Dollard 0-1.	Referee: M Kiely (Dublin)

20 November 1994	Kilkenny	2-10 - 3-3	Cork	Nowlan Park, Kilkenny
	D Gaffney 1-1, DJ Carey 0-4, E Morrissey 1-0, PJ Delaney 0-2, B O'Keeffe 0-2, A Ronan 0-1.		G Manley 1-1, K Murray 1-0, F Ryan 1-0, M Mullins 0-2.	Referee: D Murphy (Wexford)

26 February 1995	Cork	1-12 - 1-7	Tipperary	Páirc Uí Rinn, Cork
	B Egan 0-9, A Browne 1-0, S McCarthy 0-2, K Murray 0-1.		P Fox 1-0, M Cleary 0-3, A Crosse 0-2, D Ryan 0-1, N English 0-1.	Referee: D Murphy (Wexford)

26 February 1995	Laois	0-5 - 1-17	Clare	O'Moore Park, Portlaoise
	D Cuddy 0-2, B McEvoy 0-1, A Bergin 0-1, N Delaney 0-1.		C Lyons 1-6, O Baker 0-5, G O'Loughlin 0-2, A Daly 0-1, F Tuohy 0-1, C Clancy 0-1, J McInerney 0-1.	Referee: JJ McDonnell (Tipperary)

26 February 1995	Kilkenny	2-11 - 1-10	Galway	Nowlan Park, Kilkenny
	A Ronan 0-5, DJ Carey 1-0, J Power 1-0, C Brennan 0-3, M Phelan 0-2, L Keoghan 0-1, PJ Delaney 0-1.		C Moran 0-4, F Forde 1-0, L Burke 0-2, O Fahy 0-2, M McGarth 0-1, J Rabbitte 0-1.	Referee: T Murray (Limerick)

26 February 1995	Limerick	0-15 - 2-7	Antrim	Gaelic Grounds, Limerick
	G Kirby 0-4, B Tobin 0-3, J Ryan 0-3, M Galligan 0-2, D Clarke 0-1, M Houlihan 0-1, C Carey 0-1.		J Carson 1-2, P Nugent 1-0, R Donnelly 0-2, P McKillen 0-1, T McNaughton 0-1, F Collins 0-1.	Referee: P Aherne (Carlow)

12 March 1995	Clare	2-9 - 0-10	Tipperary	Cusack Park, Ennis
	G O'Loughlin 1-1, J McInerney 1-1, S McMahon 0-2, C Clancy 0-1, J O'Connor 0-1, C Lyons 0-1, E Taaffe 0-1.		M Cleary 0-5, N English 0-2, T Dunne 0-1, J Lehay 0-1, P Fox 0-1.	Referee: T Lyons (Limerick)

12 March 1995	Laois	0-9 - 2-14	Cork	O'Moore Park, Portlaoise
	B Maher 0-2, G Norton 0-2, T Kenna 0-2, D Conroy 0-2, F O'Sullivan 0-1.		M Mullins 1-4, A Browne 1-1, B Egan 0-4, D Ronan 0-2, K Murray 0-1, J Cashman 0-1, M Landers 0-1.	Referee: W Barrett (Tipperary)

12 March 1995	Galway	0-20 - 2-7	Limerick	Ballinasloe Sportsfield, Ballinasloe
	C Moran 0-5, L Burke 0-5, M McGrath 0-2, M Coleman 0-2, F Forde 0-2, J Cooney 0-2, O Fahy 0-1.		T Herbert 1-0, M Galligan 0-3, G Kirby 0-2, TJ Ryan 0-1.	Referee: D Murphy (Wexford)

12 March 1995	Kilkenny	1-16 - 2-9	Antrim	Nowlan Park, Kilkenny
	A Ronan 0-7, E Morrissey 0-4, DJ Carey 1-0, B O'Keeffe 0-1, D Gaffney 0-1, C Brennan 0-1, J Power 0-1, D Byrne 0-1.		J Carson 0-6, A McCloskey 1-1, F Collins 1-0, SP McKillop 0-1, T McNaughton 0-1.	Referee: J McDonnell (Tipperary)

26 March 1995	Limerick	0-12 - 1-8	Kilkenny	Gaelic Grounds, Limerick
	G Kirby 0-5, M Galligan 0-3, F Carroll 0-2, S O'Neill 0-1, D Quigley 0-1.		PJ Delaney 1-1, DJ Carey 0-3, E Morrissey 0-2, J Power 0-1, M Phelan 0-1.	Referee: W Barrett (Tipperary)

26 March 1995	Cork	1-8 - 0-10	Clare	Páirc Uí Rinn, Cork
	K Murray 1-1, B Corcoran 0-3, P Smith 0-1, M Mullins 0-1, D Ronan 0-1, B Egan 0-1.		E Taaffe 0-3, C Lyons 0-2, S McMahon 0-2, G O'Loughlin 0-2, A Daly 0-1.	Referee: D Murphy (Wexford)

26 March 1995	Antrim	1-9 - 1-9	Galway	Casement Park, Belfast
	J Carson 1-6, P Donnelly 0-2, P McKillen 0-1.		O Fahy 1-1, L Burke 0-4, C Moran 0-4.	Referee: A Mac Suibhne (Dublin)

26 March 1995	Tipperary	2-13 - 0-5	Laois	St. Cronan's Park, Roscrea
	M Cleary 2-6, J Leahy 0-2, C Bonnar 0-1, B O'Meara 0-1, L McGrath 0-1, A Ryan 0-1, A Crosse 0-1.		N Rigney 0-2, T Kenna 0-2, O Coss 0-1.	Referee: J Cody (Galway)

=== Knock-out stage ===
Quarter-finals

9 April 1995 Quarter-final	Cork	2-11 - 3-10	Offaly	Semple Stadium, Thurles
	B Egan 0-7, A Browne 2-0, F McCormack 0-1, M Mullins 0-1, D Ronan 0-1, M Ryan 0-1.		P O'Connor 2-0, Johnny Dooley 0-6, J Troy 1-0, Joe Dooley 0-2, B Dooley 0-1.	Attendance: 10,300; Referee: W Barrett (Tipperary)

9 April 1995 Quarter-final	Galway	0-9 - 2-10	Waterford	Semple Stadium, Thurles
	L Burke 0-3, C Moran 0-2, M McGrath 0-2, P Kelly 0-1, M Coleman 0-1.		P Flynn 1-4, S Frampton 1-0, B O'Sullivan 0-2, P Queally 0-1, B Walsh 0-1, J Brenner 0-1, T Browne 0-1.	Attendance: 10,300; Referee: T Murray (Limerick)

Semi-finals

23 April 1995 Semi-final	Kilkenny	4-8 - 0-14	Offaly	Semple Stadium, Thurles
	DJ Carey 3-1, D Byrne 1-2, A Ronan 0-3, M Phelan 0-1, E Morrissey 0-1.		Johnny Dooley 0-9, Joe Dooley 0-1, P O'Connor 0-1, J Pilkington 0-1, K Martin 0-1, D Pilkington 0-1.	Attendance: 25,000; Referee: A Mac Suibhne (Dublin)

23 April 1995 Semi-final	Clare	2-14 - 0-8	Waterford	Semple Stadium, Thurles
	E Taaffe 0-7, J McInerney 2-0, J O'Connor 0-3, G O'Loughlin 0-2, S Sheedy 0-1, PJ O'Connell 0-1.		P Flynn 0-6, T Browne 0-2.	Attendance: 25,000; Referee: D Murphy (Wexford)

Final

7 May 1995 Final	Kilkenny	2-12 - 0-9	Clare	Semple Stadium, Thurles
	A Ronan 0-8 E Morrissey 1-3, D Byrne 1-0, C Brennan 0-1.		S McMahon 0-4, J O'Connor 0-2, J McInerney 0-1, G O'Loughlin 0-1, E Taaffe 0-1.	Attendance: 20,909; Referee: P O'Connor (Limerick)

=== Scoring statistics ===
Top scorers overall

Rank	Player	Team	Tally	Total	Matches	Average
1	Michael Cleary	Tipperary	3-34	43	7	6.14
2	Adrian Ronan	Kilkenny	0-33	33	8	4.12
3	Cyril Lyons	Clare	2-23	29	8	3.62
3	Gary Kirby	Limerick	1-26	29	6	4.83
3	Barry Egan	Cork	0-29	29	8	3.62
6	D. J. Carey	Kilkenny	6-10	28	8	4.50
7	Liam Burke	Galway	0-27	27	8	3.37
8	Cathal Moran	Galway	0-24	24	6	4.00
9	Jim McInerney	Galway	5-8	23	7	3.28
10	John Carson	Antrim	2-15	21	4	5.25
10	Eamon Morrissey	Kilkenny	2-15	21	9	2.33

Top scorers in a single game

Rank	Player	Team	Tally	Total	Opposition
1	Michael Cleary	Tipperary	2-06	12	Laois
2	Michael Cleary	Tipperary	1-08	11	Limerick
3	D. J. Carey	Kilkenny	3-01	10	Offaly
4	Brian Cunningham	Cork	2-03	9	Antrim
4	Gary Kirby	Limerick	1-06	9	Cork
4	Cyril Lyons	Clare	1-06	9	Laois
4	John Carson	Antrim	1-06	9	Galway
4	Liam Burke	Galway	0-09	9	Laois
4	Barry Egan	Cork	0-09	9	Tipperary
4	Johnny Dooley	Offaly	0-09	9	Kilkenny

== Division 2 ==
National Hurling League Division 2
- Season: 1994-95
- Champions: Waterford
- Promoted: Kerry; Offaly; Waterford
- Relegated: Carlow
- All statistics correct as of 19 February 2017.

On 26 March 1995, Waterford secured the title after an 0-11 to 0-6 win over Kerry in the final round of the group stage. Kerry and Offaly were also promoted to Division 1.

Carlow and Meath were relegated from Division 2.

=== Table ===
Pos	Team	Pld	W	D	L	Diff	Pts	Notes
1	Waterford	7	6	0	1	22	12	Division 2 champions, promoted to Division 1
2	Offaly	7	5	0	2	31	10	Promoted to Division 1
3	Kerry	7	4	0	3	11	8	Promoted to Division 1
4	Down	7	4	0	3	-1	8	
5	Wexford	7	3	0	4	25	6	
6	Meath	7	2	2	3	-12	6	
7	Dublin	7	2	1	4	-4	5	
8	Carlow	7	0	1	6	-77	1	Relegated to Division 3

=== Knock-out stage ===
Play-off

9 April 1995 Play-off	Kerry	2-15 - 2-10 (aet)	Down	O'Moore Park, Portlaoise
	P O'Connell 0-7, M Hennessy 1-3, J O'Sullivan 1-0, B O'Sullivan 0-2, C Walsh 0-1, K Boyle 0-1, J Walsh 0-1.		C Arthurs 1-4, N Sands 1-0, D O'Prey 0-3, K Coulter 0-1, M Mallon 0-1, D Hughes 0-1.	Referee: A Mac Suibhne (Dublin)
