= Brian McEvoy =

Irish hurler

Personal information
- Native name: Brian Mac Fhíobhuí (Irish)
- Nickname: Sales rep
- Born: 11 July 1974 (age 52) Kilkenny, Ireland
- Height: 5 ft 11 in (180 cm)

Sport
- Sport: Hurling
- Position: Left wing-forward
Club
Years	Club	Apps (scores)
1992-2008	James Stephens	39 (4-72)
Club titles
	Football	Hurling
Kilkenny titles	5	2
Leinster titles	0	2
All-Ireland titles	0	1
Inter-county
Years	County	Apps (scores)
1996-2003	Kilkenny	23 (2-28)
Inter-county titles
- Leinster titles: 5
- All-Irelands: 2
- NHL: 2
- All Stars: 1

Brian Edwin McEvoy (born 11 July 1974) is an Irish former hurler. At club level, he played with James Stephens and at inter-county level with the Kilkenny senior hurling team.

== Career ==
At club level, McEvoy first played for James Stephens as a dual player at juvenile and underage levels. He was part of the club's minor teams that claimed five minor titles across both codes between 1990 and 1992. McEvoy later won consecutive Kilkenny U21HC titles.

McEvoy continued his dual player status at senior level. He won five Kilkenny SFC titles between 1993 and 2008. As a hurler, he won consecutive Kilkenny SHC medals in 2004 and 2005. These were later converted into Leinster Club SHC medals. McEvoy lined out at midfield when James Stephens beat Athenry by 0–19 to 0–14 in the 2005 All-Ireland Club SHC final.

At inter-county level, McEvoy first played for Kilkenny as captain of the minor team that won the Leinster MHC title in 1992. He later progressed to the under-21 team and won an All-Ireland U21HC medal in 1994, after a 3–10 to 0–11 win over Galway in the final.

McEvoy made his first appearance for the senior team in 1996. He went on to win five consecutive Leinster SHC medals between 1998 and 2002. McEvoy was at midfield when Kilkenny beat Offaly to win the All-Ireland SHC title in 2000. He claimed a second winners' medal after coming on as a substitute in the defeat of Clare in 2002. Having just won his second consecutive National Hurling League medal, a series of recurring injuries over an 18-month period resulted in McEvoy retiring from inter-county hurling in June 2003.

Performances at inter-county level resulted in his selection to the Leinster inter-provincial team and he won a Railway Cup medal in 1998. He was also part of the All-Star team in 1999.

== Honours ==
James Stephens

- All-Ireland Senior Club Hurling Championship: 2005
- Leinster Senior Club Hurling Championship: 2004, 2005
- Kilkenny Senior Hurling Championship: 2004, 2005
- Kilkenny Senior Football Championship: 1993, 1995, 1996, 2003, 2008
- Kilkenny Under-21 Hurling Championship: 1993, 1994
- Kilkenny Minor Hurling Championship: 1991, 1992
- Kilkenny Minor Football Championship: 1990, 1991, 1992

Kilkenny

- All-Ireland Senior Hurling Championship: 2000, 2002
- Leinster Senior Hurling Championship: 1998, 1999, 2000, 2001, 2002
- National Hurling League: 2002, 2003
- All-Ireland Under-21 Hurling Championship: 1994
- Leinster Under-21 Hurling Championship: 1994, 1995
- Leinster Minor Hurling Championship: 1992 (c)

Sporting positions
Preceded by Dan O'Neill	Kilkenny minor hurling team captain 1992	Succeeded by Shane Doyle
