= 1992 Kilkenny Intermediate Hurling Championship =

- Sponsor: Top Oil
- Champions: Young Irelands (1st title); John Brennan (captain)
- Runners-up: Conahy Shamrocks; John Feehan (captain)

The 1992 Kilkenny Intermediate Hurling Championship was the 28th staging of the Kilkenny Senior Hurling Championship since its establishment by the Kilkenny County Board.

On 18 October 1992, Young Irelands won the championship after a 2–12 to 1–07 defeat of Conahy Shamrocks in the final at Nowlan Park. It remains their only intermediate championship title.

== Results ==
=== Final ===
18 October 1992 Final	Young Irelands	2-12 - 1-07	Conahy Shamrocks	Nowlan Park, Kilkenny
	J Brennan 1-3, C Carter 1-1, P O'Neill 0-4, T Farrell 0-2, J Fitzgerald 0-2.		S Mahony 1-0, J Feehan 0-2, C Muldowney 0-2, K Brennan 0-1, N Brennan 0-1, C Brennan 0-1.	Referee: P Hayes (Graigue-Ballycallan)
