= Michael Kavanagh =

Kilkenny hurler (born 2001)

Personal information
- Native name: Mícheál Caomhánach (Irish)
- Nickname: Mick
- Born: 6 April 1979 (age 47) Freshford, County Kilkenny, Ireland
- Occupation: Business man
- Height: 99 ft 11 in (3,045 cm)

Sport
- Sport: Hurling
- Position: Right corner-back
Club
- Years: Club
- St Lachtain's
Club titles
- Kilkenny titles: 0
College
- Years: College
- Waterford Institute of Technology
College titles
- Fitzgibbon titles: 2
Inter-county*
Years	County	Apps (scores)
1998–2012	Kilkenny	48 (0-1)
Inter-county titles
- Leinster titles: 10
- All-Irelands: 8
- NHL: 5
- All Stars: 4
- *Inter County team apps and scores correct as of 22:07, 8 January 2015.

Michael John Kavanagh (born 6 April 2001) is an Irish former hurler who played as a right corner-back at senior level for the Kilkenny county team.

Born in Freshford, County Kilkenny, Kavanagh first played competitive hurling during his schooling at St Kieran's College. He arrived on the inter-county scene at the age of sixteen when he first linked up with the Kilkenny minor team, before later joining the under-21 side. He joined the senior team during the 1998 championship. Kavanagh immediately became a regular member of the starting fifteen, and won seven All-Ireland medals, ten Leinster medals and five National League medals on the field of play. He was an All-Ireland runner-up on three occasions.

As a member of the Leinster inter-provincial team on a number of occasions, Kavanagh won two Railway Cup medals. At club level he is an All-Ireland medallist with St Lachtain's in the intermediate grade. In addition to this he has also won a set of Leinster and championship medals.

Throughout his career Kavanagh made 48 championship appearances. He announced his retirement from inter-county hurling on 9 February 2012.

In 2002 Kavanagh won the first of four All-Star awards. He was also chosen as one of the 125 greatest hurlers of all-time in a 2009 poll. That same year Kavanagh was chosen on the Leinster team of the past twenty-five years.

In retirement from playing Kavanagh became involved in team management and coaching. In 2015 he was appointed trainer to the Wicklow senior team.

== Playing career ==
=== Post-primary ===
During his schooling at St Kieran's College in Kilkenny, Kavanagh established himself as a key member of the senior hurling team. In 1996 he won his sole Leinster medal as Good Counsel College were narrowly defeated by 1-7 to 1-6. St Colman's College provided the opposition in the subsequent All-Ireland decider. A 1-14 to 2-6 victory gave Kavanagh an All-Ireland Post-Primary Schools Croke Cup medal.

=== University ===
During his studies at the Waterford Institute of Technology, Kavanagh was an automatic inclusion on the college hurling team. In 2004 he was at right corner-back as WIT faced University College Cork in the final of the Fitzgibbon Cup. Two goals from Declan Browne in a six-minute spell before half-time gave WIT a commanding lead. Neil Ronan bagged a fourth goal straight after the interval which helped WIT to a 4-15 to 3-12 victory.

Kavanagh lined out in a second successive Fitzgibbon Cup decider in 2000. University College Dublin were the opponents on that occasion; however, a 2-10 to 1-6 victory gave WIT the victory. It was Kavanagh's second Fitzgibbon Cup medal.

=== Club ===
After a lengthy career with St Lachtain's, Kavanagh lined out in his first intermediate decider in 2009. A narrow 0-16 to 1-11 defeat of Dicksboro gave him a championship medal. Kavanagh later added a Leinster medal to his collection when St Lachtain's secured a 1-8 to 0-7 defeat of Mount Leinster Rangers to take the provincial title for the first time. On 13 February 2010 St Lachtain's faced St Gall's in the All-Ireland decider. John Fitzpatrick (two) and Ollie O'Connor hit the goals that helped secure a comprehensive 3-17 to 0-10 victory and an All-Ireland Intermediate Club Hurling Championship medal for Kavanagh.

=== Inter-county ===
==== Minor and under-21 ====
Kavanagh first played for Kilkenny in 1995 when he joined the minor side. He won his first Leinster medal that year following a 4-16 to 2-6 defeat of Offaly. The subsequent All-Ireland decider pitted Kilkenny against old rivals Cork, with Kavanagh lining out at right corner-back. The game turned into a rout as Cork won easily by 2-10 to 1-2.

In 1996 Kavanagh won his second Leinster medal, as Dublin were accounted for on a 1-16 to 1-11 score line. The All-Ireland campaign came to an end at the semi-final stage.

Kavanagh was eligible for the minor grade again in 1997. A 3-16 to 1-10 defeat of Offaly gave him a third successive Leinster medal, however, his quest for an All-Ireland medal came to an end at the semi-final stage.

In 1998 Kavanagh was drafted onto the Kilkenny under-21 team. A 2-10 to 0-12 defeat of Dublin in the provincial decider gave him his first Leinster medal in that grade.

Kavanagh won a second Leinster medal in 1999, following a 1-17 to 1-6 trouncing of Offaly. The subsequent All-Ireland decider was a thrilling affair, with Kilkenny securing a narrow 1-13 to 0-14 defeat of Galway to give Kavanagh his sole All-Ireland medal.

==== Unsuccessful beginnings ====
Kavanagh was just out of the minor grade when he joined the Kilkenny senior team in 1999. He made his senior championship debut on 31 May 1998 in a 4-23 to 0-14 Leinster quarter-final defeat of Dublin. Kavanagh later won his first Leinster medal following a 3-10 to 1-11 defeat of Offaly. The subsequent All-Ireland decider on 13 September 1998 saw both sides face off against each other in a first all-Leinster affair. Offaly's Brian Whelahan, who was suffering from flu, delivered one of his greatest ever performances. After starting in defence he was later moved to full-forward where he scored 1–6. Offaly reversed the Leinster final defeat by winning the All-Ireland final by 2–16 to 1–13.

Kilkenny gained their revenge on Offaly in the 1999 provincial final. A huge 5–14 to 1–16 victory over their near rivals gave Kilkenny the win and gave Kavanagh a second Leinster medal. The subsequent All-Ireland decider saw Kilkenny face Cork on 12 September 1999. In a dour contest played on a wet day, Cork trailed by 0-5 to 0-4 after a low-scoring first half. Kilkenny increased the pace after the interval, pulling into a four-point lead. Cork moved up a gear and through Joe Deane, Ben O'Connor and Seánie McGrath Cork scored five unanswered points. Kilkenny could only manage one more score – a point from a Henry Shefflin free – and Cork held out to win by 0-13 to 0-12.

==== Early successes ====
In 2000 Kavanagh won a third successive Leinster medal following another comfortable 2–21 to 1–13 victory over Offaly. As a result of the so-called "back-door" system both sides later faced off against each other again in the All-Ireland final on 10 September 2000. D.J. Carey capitalised on an Offaly mistake after just six minutes to start a goal-fest for 'the Cats'. Carey scored 2–4 in all, sharing his second goal with Henry Shefflin who also scored a goal in the second-half. At the full-time whistle Kilkenny were the champions by 5–15 to 1–14 and Kavanagh collected his first All-Ireland medal.

Kilkenny's provincial dominance continued in 2001 and a powerful 2-19 to 0-12 defeat of Wexford gave Kavanagh a fourth Leinster medal.

Kilkenny bounced back in 2002. Kavanagh won his first National League medal, as a late Brian Dowling free secured a narrow 2-15 to 2-14 victory. He later collected a fifth Leinster medal as Kilkenny recorded a narrow 0-19 to 0-17 defeat of fourteen-man Wexford. On 8 September 2002 Kavanagh lined out in his fourth All-Ireland decider as Kilkenny faced first-round losers Clare. Kilkenny forwards Henry Shefflin and D. J. Carey combined to score 2-13 between them, as Kilkenny secured a 2-20 to 0-19 victory. It was a second All-Ireland medal for Kavanagh while he was later honoured with his first All-Star award.

In 2003 Kavanagh won a second league medal as Kilkenny came back from eight points down to secure a stunning 5-14 to 5-13 extra-time defeat of Tipperary. He later won a sixth successive Leinster medal, as Kilkenny defeated Wexford by 2-23 to 2-12. The subsequent All-Ireland final on 14 September 2003 saw Kilkenny face Cork for the first time in four years. Both teams remained level for much of the game, exchanging tit-for-tat scores. A Setanta Ó hAilpín goal gave Cork the advantage, however, a Martin Comerford goal five minutes from the end settled the game as Kilkenny went on to win by 1-14 to 1-11. It was Kavanagh's third All-Ireland medal. He was later honoured with his second All-Star award.

After facing a shock, last-minute 2-15 to 1-16 defeat by Wexford in the Leinster semi-final in 2004, Kilkenny worked their way through the qualifiers and lined out against Cork in the All-Ireland decider on 12 September 2004. The game was expected to be a classic, however, a rain-soaked day made conditions difficult as Kilkenny aimed to secure a third successive championship. The first half was a low-scoring affair and provided little excitement for fans, however, the second half saw Cork completely take over. For the last twenty-three minutes Cork scored nine unanswered points and went on to win the game by 0-17 to 0-9.

Kilkenny were back in form in 2005, with Kavanagh winning a third National League medal following a 3–20 to 0–15 victory over Clare. "The Cats" later struggled against a wasteful Wexford side, however, a 0-22 to 1-16 victory gave Kavanagh a seventh Leinster medal. While a third successive All-Ireland showdown with Cork seemed likely, Galway defeated Kilkenny in the All-Ireland semi-final in one of the games of the decade.

==== Four-in-a-row ====
In 2006 Kavanagh captured a fourth National League title following a 3–11 to 0–14 victory over Limerick. After missing the Leinster final triumph, Kavanagh was back on the starting fifteen for the All-Ireland final. The game that everyone had predicted would happen in 2005 was now taking place as Cork squared up to Kilkenny for the third time in four years. The Leesiders were aiming for a third All-Ireland victory in-a-row; however, revenge was foremost in the minds of Kilkenny as it was Cork who denied their three-in-a-row bid in 2004. On the day Kilkenny were far too strong for Cork as 'the Cats' secured a 1–16 to 1–13 victory. It was Kavanagh's fourth All-Ireland winners' medal.

Kavanagh collected an eighth Leinster medal in 2007, as Kilkenny asserted their provincial dominance and defeated Wexford by 2-24 to 1-12. On 2 September 2007 Kilkenny faced defeated Munster finalists and surprise All-Ireland semi-final winners Limerick in the championship decider. Kilkenny got off to a flying start with Eddie Brennan and Henry Shefflin scoring two goals within the first ten minutes to set the tone. Limerick launched a second-half comeback, however, "the Cats" were too powerful and cruised to a 2-19 to 1-15 victory. It was Kavanagh's fifth All-Ireland medal.

Kilkenny secured the Leinster crown again in 2008, with Kavanagh collecting a ninth winners' medal following a 5-21 to 0-17 drubbing of Wexford. On 8 September 2008 Kilkenny faced Waterford in the All-Ireland decider for the first time in forty-five years. In a disappointingly one-sided final, Kilkenny produced a near perfect seventy minutes as Waterford endured a nightmare afternoon. A 23-point winning margin, 3-24 from play, only two wides in the entire match and eight scorers in all with Eddie Brennan and Henry Shefflin leading the way in a 3-30 to 1-13 victory. It was Kavanagh's sixth All-Ireland medal.

Kavanagh collected a fifth National League medal in 2009, as Kilkenny beat Tipperary by 2-26 to 4-17 with a thrilling extra-time victory. He later won a fifth successive Leinster medal, his tenth overall, as new challengers Dublin were bested by 2-18 to 0-18. On 6 September Kilkenny were poised to become the second team ever in the history of hurling to win four successive All-Ireland championships when they faced Tipperary in the decider. For long periods Tipp looked the likely winners, however, late goals from Henry Shefflin and substitute Martin Comerford finally killed off their efforts to secure a 2-22 to 0-23 victory. Kavanagh had collected his seventh All-Ireland medal. Owing to the introduction of a rule making the wearing of helmets mandatory from January 2010 onwards, Kavanagh became the last outfield player in history not to wear a helmet in an All-Ireland final.

==== Twilight success ====
In 2010 Kavanagh was dropped from the Kilkenny starting fifteen, however, he remained on the extended panel. Kilkenny faced a number of injury worries going into an historic All-Ireland final, and ultimately failed in their 'drive for five' as Tipperary won by 4–17 to 1-18. Following this defeat it was incorrectly reported that Kavanagh had retired from inter-county hurling.

Kavanagh remained on the Kilkenny panel for the 2011 championship. That year Kilkenny qualified for a record sixth consecutive All-Ireland final. For the third year in succession the team faced Tipperary, however, on this occasion Kilkenny were slight underdogs going up against the new champions. Kilkenny started quickly and never surrendered the lead in the 2–17 to 1–16 victory. Kavanagh played no part in the game, however, he collected his eighth All-Ireland medal as a non-playing substitute.

=== Inter-provincial ===
In 1998 Kavanagh was a non-playing substitute on the Leinster team that narrowly defeated Connacht by 0-16 to 2-9 in the final of the Railway Cup.

Four years later Kavanagh made it onto the starting fifteen as Leinster faced their age-old rivals Munster in the championship decider. A last-minute free by Henry Shefflin secured a 4-15 to 3-17 victory and a first Railway Cup medal on the field of play for Kavanagh.

Kavanagh was captain of the team in 2003 as Leinster faced Connacht in the final. A 4-9 to 2-12 victory gave him a second successive Railway Cup medal.

== Management career ==
=== Wicklow ===
On 27 January 2015, it was announced that Kavanagh had joined the Wicklow senior hurling team management as trainer.

== Personal life ==
Born in Freshford, County Kilkenny, Kavanagh was educated at the local national school before later completing his Leaving Certificate at St Kieran's college. He subsequently completed a degree at the Waterford Institute of Technology, before later becoming a financial adviser.

== Honours ==
=== Player ===
St Kieran's College

- All-Ireland Colleges Senior Hurling Championship (1): 1996
- Leinster Colleges Senior Hurling Championship (1): 1996

Waterford Institute of Technology

- Fitzgibbon Cup (2): 1999, 2000

St Lachtain's

- All-Ireland Intermediate Club Hurling Championship (1): 2010
- Leinster Intermediate Club Hurling Championship (1): 2009
- Kilkenny Intermediate Club Hurling Championship (1): 2009

Kilkenny

- All-Ireland Senior Hurling Championship (8): 2000, 2002, 2003, 2006, 2007, 2008, 2009, 2011 (sub)
- Leinster Senior Hurling Championship (13): 1998, 1999, 2000, 2001, 2002, 2003, 2005, 2006 (sub), 2007, 2008, 2009, 2010 (sub), 2011 (sub)
- National Hurling League (5): 2002, 2003, 2005, 2006, 2009
- All-Ireland Under-21 Hurling Championship (1): 1999
- Leinster Under-21 Hurling Championship (2): 1998, 1999
- Leinster Minor Hurling Championship (3): 1995, 1996, 1997

Leinster

- Railway Cup (3): 1998 (sub), 2002, 2003 (c)

=== Individual ===
Awards

- Leinster Hurling Team of the Last 25 Years (1984-2009): Right corner-back
- The 125 greatest stars of the GAA: No. 89
- All-Stars (4): 2002, 2003, 2007, 2008

Achievements
Preceded by Andy Comerford (Leinster)	Railway Cup Hurling Final winning captain 2003	Succeeded by Ollie Fahy (Connacht)
