= 1988 All-Ireland Minor Hurling Championship =

All-Ireland Minor Hurling Championship 1988
Championship Details
- Dates: 14 May 1988 - 4 September 1988
- Teams: 15

All Ireland Champions
- Winners: Kilkenny (13th win)
- Captain: Patsy Brophy

All Ireland Runners-up
- Runners-up: Cork
- Captain: Paudie O'Brien

Provincial Champions
- Munster: Cork
- Leinster: Kilkenny
- Ulster: Antrim
- Connacht: Not Played

Championship Statistics
- Matches Played: 14
- Top Scorer: Brian Cunningham (3-29)

The 1988 All-Ireland Minor Hurling Championship was the 58th staging of the All-Ireland Minor Hurling Championship since its establishment by the Gaelic Athletic Association in 1928. The championship began on 14 May 1988 and ended on 4 September 1988.

Offaly entered the championship as the defending champions in search of a third successive All-Ireland title, however, they were beaten by Kilkenny in the Leinster final.

On 4 September 1988, Kilkenny won the championship following a 3-13 to 0-12 defeat of Cork in the All-Ireland final. This was their 13th All-Ireland title overall and their first title since 1981.

Cork's Brian Cunningham was the championship's top scorer with 3-29.

== Results ==
=== Leinster Minor Hurling Championship ===
Quarter-finals

25 May 1988 Quarter-final	Wexford	1-18 - 3-06	Kerry	Semple Stadium, Thurles
	R Quigley 0-5, P O'Leary 0-5, M Redmond 1-1, J Kelly 0-4, A Codd 0-2, B Kehoe 0-1.		P Regan 2-0, J O'Sullivan 1-0, PJ Hickey 0-3, S Regan 0-3.

25 May 1988 Quarter-final	Kilkenny	1-18 - 2-07	Dublin	O'Moore Park, Portlaoise
	A Ronan 0-9, DJ Carey 1-3, P O'Neill 0-2, P O'Grady 0-1, P McCluskey 0-1, C Carter 0-1, W O'Keeffe 0-1.		D Harmon 1-1, G Gregg 1-0, P McManus 0-2, M Curran 0-2, D Eustace 0-2.

Semi-finals

27 June 1988 Semi-final	Kilkenny	5-24 - 1-03	Laois	Dr. Cullen Park, Carlow
	A Ronan 0-9, P O'Grady 2-2, P Treacy 2-1, D Dooley 1-1, B Ryan 0-4, P O'Neill 0-3, DJ Carey 0-2, B O'Keeffe 0-1, C Carter 0-1.		I Fennell 1-0, F Cuddy 0-2, J Kilmartin 0-1.

28 June 1988 Semi-final	Offaly	0-12 - 1-08	Wexford	Nowlan Park, Kilkenny
	A Cahill 0-4, J Dooley 0-2, A Mulrooney 0-2, J Pilkington 0-1, R Dooley 0-1, N Bryant 0-1, D Mulahire 0-1.		P O'Leary 0-4, R Quigley 1-0, A Codd 0-2, S O'Leary 0-1, J Kelly 0-1.

Final

10 July 1988 Final	Kilkenny	2-06 - 0-06	Offaly	Croke Park, Dublin
	P O'Grady 1-2, D Dooley 1-0, P O'Neill 0-2, W O'Keeffe 0-1, A Ronan 0-1.		A Mulrooney 0-2, J Pilkington 0-1, A Cahill 0-1, J Dooley 0-1, D Barron 0-1.	Referee: N Byrne (Wicklow)

=== Munster Minor Hurling Championship ===
First round

14 May 1988 First round	Tipperary	1-11 - 0-07	Clare	Bruff Sportsfield, Bruff
	M Hogan 1-4, K Ralph 0-3, TJ O'Dwyer 0-2, K Kennedy 0-2.		P Minogue 0-3, P Healy 0-3, M Warren 0-1.	Referee: K Walsh (Limerick)

Semi-finals

6 July 1988 Semi-final	Limerick	2-06 - 4-10	Tipperary	Gaelic Grounds, Limerick
	J Fitzgibbon 2-2, P Heffernan 0-2, F Carroll 0-1, PJ Garvey 0-1.		K Ralph 1-7, K Kennedy 2-0, S Quinn 0-2, B Carroll 0-1.

6 July 1988 Semi-final	Cork	2-17 - 0-04	Waterford	Clonmult Memorial Park, Midleton
	B Cunningham 1-6, P O'Brien 1-2, J Dillon 0-3, T Hurley 0-2, J McCormack 0-1, V Murray 0-1, K Roche 0-1, D Quirke 0-1.		J Brenner 0-2, A White 0-1, S Curran 0-1.	Referee: J Lonergan (Tipperary)

Final

17 July 1988 Final	Cork	5-07 - 1-02	Tipperary	Gaelic Grounds, Limerick
	P O'Brien 2-0, B Cunningham 1-3, T Hurley 1-1, K Roche 1-1, D Quirke 0-1, T Kelleher 0-1.		T O'Dwyer 1-0, S Quinn 0-1, K Ralph 0-1.	Referee: M Quinn (Clare)

=== Ulster Minor Hurling Championship ===
Semi-final

10 July 1988 Semi-final	Down	2-11 - 2-05	Derry	Mitchel Park, Ballygalget
	B Gallagher 1-3, M Blair 1-0, P Mason 0-3, G Savage 0-2, K Blaney 0-2, B Coulter 0-1.		P McElhinney 1-4, O Collins 1-0, B McCormack 0-1.

Final

31 July 1988 Final	Antrim	2-10 - 2-09	Down	Mitchel Park, Ballygalget

=== All-Ireland Minor Hurling Championship ===
Semi-finals

8 August 1988 Semi-final	Galway	1-06 - 3-15	Kilkenny	Croke Park, Dublin
	J Campbell 1-1, B Flynn 0-3, G McGrath 0-1, B Darcy 0-1.		A Ronan 1-3, C Carter 0-5, P O'Grady 0-4, B Ryan 1-1, DJ Carey 1-1, P Treacy 0-1.	Referee: E Barrett (Tipperary)

15 August 1988 Semi-final	Cork	3-26 - 1-01	Antrim	Croke Park, Dublin
	B Cunningham 1-11, P O'Brien 1-3, T Hurley 0-6, K Roche 1-0, T Kelleher 0-2, M Sheehan 0-2, J Dillon 0-2.		J Carson 1-0, A Elliott 0-1.	Referee: P Delaney (Laois)

Final

4 September 1988 Final	Kilkenny	3-13 - 0-12	Cork	Croke Park, Dublin
	DJ Carey 1-2, A Ronan 0-5, P Treacy 1-1, C Carter 1-0, D Dooley 0-2, W O'Keeffe 0-1, B Ryan 0-1, P O'Grady 0-1.		B Cunningham 0-9, M Sheehan 0-2, B Corcoran 0-1.

== Championship statistics ==
=== Top scorers ===
Top scorers overall

Rank	Player	Club	Tally	Total	Matches	Average
1	Brian Cunningham	Cork	3-29	38	4	9.50
2	Adrian Ronan	Kilkenny	1-27	30	5	6.00
3	Pat O'Grady	Kilkenny	3-10	19	5	3.80
4	Paudie O'Brien	Cork	4-05	17	4	4.25
4	D. J. Carey	Kilkenny	3-08	17	5	3.40
5	Ken Ralph	Tipperary	1-11	14	3	4.66

Top scorers in a single game

Rank	Player	Club	Tally	Total	Opposition
1	Brian Cunningham	Cork	1-11	14	Antrim
2	Ken Ralph	Tipperary	1-07	10	Limerick
3	Brian Cunningham	Cork	1-06	9	Waterford
3	Adrian Ronan	Kilkenny	0-09	9	Dublin
3	Brian Cunningham	Cork	0-09	9	Kilkenny
3	Adrian Ronan	Kilkenny	0-09	9	Laois
4	Pat O'Grady	Kilkenny	2-02	8	Laois
4	John Fitzgibbon	Limerick	2-02	8	Tipperary
