= Philly Larkin =

Irish hurler

Personal information
- Native name: Pilib Ó Lorcáin (Irish)
- Born: 26 July 1973 (age 53) Kilkenny, Ireland
- Occupation: Electrician
- Height: 5 ft 11 in (180 cm)

Sport
- Sport: Hurling
- Position: Left corner-back
Club
- Years: Club
- James Stephens
Club titles
- Kilkenny titles: 3
- Leinster titles: 2
- All-Ireland Titles: 1
Inter-county
- Years: County
- 1996-2003: Kilkenny
Inter-county titles
- Leinster titles: 6
- All-Irelands: 3
- NHL: 2
- All Stars: 1

Philip "Philly" Larkin (born 26 July 1973) is an Irish sportsperson. He plays hurling with his local club James Stephens and was a member of the Kilkenny senior inter-county team from 1996 until 2003.

== Family ==
Larkin's father Phil, known as 'Fan' Larkin, won five All-Ireland medals with Kilkenny in a career that spanned seventeen seasons. Larkin's grandfather, Paddy was on the Kilkenny team throughout the 1930s..

Sporting positions
Preceded by Dave Beirne	Kilkenny Under-21 Hurling Captain; 1994	Succeeded by Peter Barry
Achievements
Preceded by Liam Burke (Galway)	All-Ireland Under-21 Hurling Final winning captain 1994	Succeeded by Brian Horgan (Tipperary)
