= Kilmoganny GAA =

Kilmoganny
- Cill Mogheanna
- Founded: 1896
- County: Kilkenny
- Colours: White and blue
- Grounds: Kilmoganny

Playing kits
Standard colours

Senior Club Championships
	All Ireland	Leinster champions	Kilkenny champions
Football:	0	0	1

Kilmoganny GAA is a Gaelic Athletic Association club located in Kilmoganny, County Kilkenny, Ireland. The club is solely concerned with the game of Gaelic football. It is a sister club of Dunnamaggin.

== History ==
Located in the village of Kilmoganny in south Kilkenny, Kilmoganny Whites and Blues, as the club was then known, was founded in November 1896. The club spent much of its existence competing in the lower grades, and enjoyed its first success in 1954 when the Kilkenny JFC title was won.

A number of Special JFC titles were won in the 1980s, however, it would by 40 years before Kilmoganny won a second Kilkenny JFC title in 1994. This was followed by a Kilkenny IFC title in 1995 which secured senior status. Kilmoganny claimed their only Kilkenny SFC title after a defeat of Dicksboro in 2000.

== Honours ==
- Kilkenny Senior Football Championship (1): 2000
- Kilkenny Intermediate Football Championship (2): 1995, 2009
- Kilkenny Junior Football Championship (2): 1954, 1994
- Kilkenny Special Junior Football Championship (2): 1986, 1988
- Kilkenny Under-21 A Football Championship (3): 1992, 1996, 1998
- Kilkenny Minor A Football Championship (2): 1952, 1953
- Kilkenny Minor B Football Championship (2): 1989, 2009

== Notable players ==
- Paul Cahill: All-Ireland SHC-winner (2002)
- David Herity: All-Ireland SHC-winner (2008, 2009, 2011, 2012, 2014)
- Canice Hickey: All-Ireland SHC-winner (2007, 2008, 2009)
- Noel Hickey: All-Ireland SHC-winner (2000, 2002, 2003, 2006, 2007, 2008, 2009, 2011, 2012)
- Eamon Kennedy: All-Ireland SHC-winner (2000)
- Ken O'Shea: Leinster SHC-winner (1998, 1999)
