= Ken O'Shea =

Irish hurler

Personal information
- Born: 23 March 1976 (age 50) Dunnamaggin, County Kilkenny, Ireland
- Occupation: Software engineer
- Height: 5 ft 10 in (178 cm)

Sport
- Sport: Hurling
- Position: Right corner-forward
Clubs
- Years: Club
- Dunnamaggin; Kilmoganny
Club titles
	Football	Hurling
Kilkenny titles	1	1
Inter-county
Years	County	Apps (scores)
1996-2000	Kilkenny	10 (6-02)
Inter-county titles
- Leinster titles: 2
- All-Irelands: 0
- NHL: 0
- All Stars: 0

Kenneth Patrick O'Shea (born 23 March 1976) is an Irish former hurler. At club level he played with Dunnamaggin and was also a member of the Kilkenny senior hurling team. He usually lined out in the forwards.

== Career ==
O'Shea first came to prominence at juvenile and underage levels with the Dunnamaggin club before quickly joining the club's top adult team. After consecutive junior and intermediate successes, he went on to win a County Senior Championship title in 1997. O'Shea first appeared on the inter-county scene with the Kilkenny minor team that won the Leinster Minor Championship in 1994. He enjoyed an unsuccessful tenure with the Kilkenny under-21 team and was on the Kilkenny junior team that lost the 1996 All-Ireland final to Galway. O'Shea was drafted onto the Kilkenny senior hurling team in 1996 and was at right corner-forward when the team lost consecutive All-Ireland finals to Offaly in 1998 and Cork in 1999.

== Honours ==
Dunnamaggin

- Kilkenny Senior Hurling Championship: 1997
- Kilkenny Intermediate Hurling Championship: 1995, 2000
- Kilkenny Junior Hurling Championship: 1994
- Kilkenny Under-21 Hurling Championship: 1995, 1996
- Kilkenny Minor Hurling Championship: 1993

Kilkenny

- Leinster Senior Hurling Championship: 1998, 1999
- Leinster Junior Hurling Championship: 1996 (c)
- Leinster Minor Hurling Championship: 1994
