= Paul Cahill (hurler) =

Irish hurler

Personal information
- Native name: Pól Ó Cathail (Irish)
- Born: 21 June 1975 (age 51) Dunnamaggin, County Kilkenny, Ireland
- Occupation: Electrician
- Height: 6 ft 1 in (185 cm)

Sport
- Sport: Hurling
- Position: Right corner-back
Clubs
- Years: Club
- Dunnamaggin; Kilmoganny
Club titles
	Football	Hurling
Kilkenny titles	1	1
Inter-county
- Years: County
- 2002: Kilkenny
Inter-county titles
- Leinster titles: 1
- All-Irelands: 1
- NHL: 1
- All Stars: 0

Paul Anthony Cahill (born 21 June 1975) is an Irish hurler who played as a right corner-back for the Kilkenny senior hurling team.

Cahill joined the Kilkenny senior team during the 2002 National League and was a member of the team for just one season. During that time he won a set of All-Ireland and National Hurling League winners' medals as a substitute. He played several league games that season. He also represented Kilkenny at under 21 and intermediate level.

At club level, Cahill is a one-time senior hurling county winning medalist with Dunnamaggin. He was also the first hurling captain for his club at minor A, under 21 A and the only senior club winning captain with Dunnamaggin to date. He won five Inter Firms senior All Irelands with Suir Engineering.

== Honours ==
Dunnamaggin

- Kilkenny Senior Hurling Championship: 1997
- Kilkenny Intermediate Hurling Championship: 2000

Kilmoganny

- Kilkenny Senior Football Championship: 2000

Kilkenny

- All-Ireland Senior Hurling Championship: 2002
- Leinster Senior Hurling Championship: 2002
- National Hurling League: 2002
