= Niall Moloney =

Irish hurler

Personal information
- Native name: Niall Ó Maoldomhnaigh (Irish)
- Born: 11 February 1975 (age 51) Muckalee, County Kilkenny, Ireland
- Occupation: Garda
- Height: 6 ft 0 in (183 cm)

Sport
- Sport: Hurling
- Position: Right corner-forward
Club
- Years: Club
- St Martin's
Club titles
- Kilkenny titles: 0
Inter-county
- Years: County
- 1996-2000: Kilkenny
Inter-county titles
- Leinster titles: 2
- All-Irelands: 0
- NHL: 1
- All Stars: 0

Niall Thomas Moloney (born 11 February 1975) is an Irish former hurler who played for Kilkenny Championship club St Martin's. He was also a member of the Kilkenny senior hurling team from 1996 until 2000, during which time he usually lined out as a corner-forward.

== Honours ==
St Martin's

- Kilkenny Intermediate Hurling Championship (1): 2002

Kilkenny

- Leinster Senior Hurling Championship (2): 1998, 1999
- National Hurling League (1): 2000
- Leinster Under-21 Hurling Championship (1): 1995

Leinster

- Railway Cup (1): 1998
