= Peter Barry (hurler) =

Kilkenny hurler (born 1974)

Personal information
- Native name: Peadar de Barra (Irish)
- Born: 24 November 1974 (age 51) Kilkenny, Ireland
- Occupation: Accountant
- Height: 6 ft 0 in (183 cm)

Sport
- Sport: Hurling
- Position: Left wing-back
Club
- Years: Club
- James Stephens
Club titles
- Kilkenny titles: 2
- Leinster titles: 2
- All-Ireland Titles: 1
College
- Years: College
- Waterford RTC
College titles
- Fitzgibbon titles: 1
Inter-county*
Years	County	Apps (scores)
1996–2005	Kilkenny	37 (0-00)
Inter-county titles
- Leinster titles: 5
- All-Irelands: 3
- NHL: 3
- All Stars: 3
- *Inter County team apps and scores correct as of 16:34, 24 January 2015.

Peter Joseph Barry (born 24 November 1974) is an Irish former hurler who played as a left wing-back at senior level for the Kilkenny county team.

Born in Kilkenny, Barry first played competitive hurling during his schooling at St Kieran's College. He arrived on the inter-county scene at the age of nineteen when he first linked up with the Kilkenny under-21 team. He joined the senior panel during the 1996 championship. Barry later became a regular member of the starting fifteen, and won three All-Ireland medals, five Leinster medals and three National Hurling League medals. He was an All-Ireland runner-up on three occasions.

As a member of the Leinster inter-provincial team, Barry won one Railway Cup medal as a non-playing substitute. At club level he is a one-time All-Ireland-winning captain with James Stephens. In addition to this he has also won two Leinster medals and two championship medals.

Throughout his career Barry made 37 championship appearances. He retired from inter-county hurling in June 2006.

== Playing career ==
=== Colleges ===
During his schooling at St Kieran's College, Barry established himself as a key member of the senior hurling team. In 1991 he won his first Leinster medal following an 0–11 to 0–6 defeat of local rivals CBS Kilkenny.

Barry added a second Leinster medal to his collection in 1992, as Callan CBS were defeated by 2–13 to 2–2. St. Colman's College provided the opposition in the subsequent All-Ireland decider. A narrow 1–7 to 0–8 victory gave Barry an All-Ireland medal.

=== University ===
During his studies at Waterford Refional Technical College, Barry was an automatic inclusion on the college hurling team. In 1995 he was on the WRTC team that faced University College Dublin in the final of the Fitzgibbon Cup. WRTC failed to bend under the weight of history and recorded a comprehensive 3–15 to 1–4 victory to claim the title for only the second time in their history.

=== Club ===
Barry plays his club hurling and football with the James Stephens club. He has had much success at under-age levels, including championship medals at minor and under-21.

In 1995 Barry was included on the James Stephens senior football team that faced city rivals Dicksboro in the championship decider. Following an 0–11 to 1–8 draw, James Stephens triumphed in the replay by 2–12 to 1–11, giving Barry a first county football championship medal.

Barry collected a second successive football championship medal in 1996 as James Stephens had a narrow 0–12 to 2–4 victory over Kilmoganny.

After a seven-year hiatus Barry won a third football championship medal following a 2–7 to 0–6 defeat of O'Loughlin Gaels in 2003.

Barry added a county hurling championship medal to his collection as captain in 2004 following a 2–16 to 3–12 defeat of Young Ireland's. He later collected a Leinster title, although the one-point defeat of University College Dublin was in controversial circumstances. The James Stephens club subsequently qualified for the All-Ireland final with Athenry providing the opposition. A 0–19 to 0–14 victory for "the village" gave Barry an All-Ireland club medal.

James Stephens retained the county championship in 2005, with Barry winning a second hurling championship medal following a 1–18 to 2–12 defeat of Ballyhale Shamrocks. He later picked up a second Leinster club medal following a second consecutive triumph over UCD. James Stephens were subsequently trounced by eventual winners Portumna in the All-Ireland semi-final.

Barry won a fourth and final football championship in 2008, as James Stephens narrowly defeated Erin's Own by 1–9 to 1–8.

=== Under-21 ===
Barry first came to prominence as a member of the Kilkenny under-21 team in 1994. He won his first Leinster medal that year following a narrow 1–14 to 0–15 defeat of Wexford. The subsequent All-Ireland decider saw Kilkenny face Galway. "The Cats" were much too powerful on that occasion and Barry collected an All-Ireland following a 3–10 to 0–11 victory.

In 1995 Barry was appointed captain of the Kilkenny under-21 team. He collected a second successive Leinster medal that year following a 2–11 to 1–12 defeat of Wexford once again. Old rivals Tipperary were the opponents in the subsequent All-Ireland final. Barry's side fell to a 1–14 to 1–10 defeat on that occasion.

=== Senior ===
==== Beginnings ====
Barry joined the Kilkenny senior team in 1996, however, it would be another few years before he became a regular on the team. He made his senior championship debut on 22 June 1997 in a 2–20 to 2–12 Leinster semi-final defeat of Dublin.

In 1998 Barry won his first Leinster medal following a 3–10 to 1–11 defeat of Offaly. The subsequent All-Ireland decider on 13 September 1998 saw both sides face off against each other in a first all-Leinster affair. Brian Whelahan, who was suffering from flu, delivered one of his greatest ever performances. After starting in defence he was later moved to full-forward where he scored 1–6. Offaly reversed the Leinster final defeat by winning the All-Ireland final by 2–16 to 1–13.

Barry missed the provincial decider defeat of Offaly in 1999, however, he was back on the team for the subsequent All-Ireland decider against Cork on 12 September 1999. In a dour contest played on a wet day, Cork trailed by 0–5 to 0–4 after a low-scoring first half. Kilkenny increased the pace after the interval, pulling into a four-point lead. Cork moved up a gear and through Joe Deane, Ben O'Connor and Seánie McGrath Cork scored five unanswered points. Kilkenny could only manage one more score – a point from a Henry Shefflin free – and Cork held out to win by 0–13 to 0–12. Barry later won his first All-Star.

==== Early successes ====
In 2000 Barry won a second Leinster medal following another comfortable 2–21 to 1–13 victory over Offaly. As a result of the so-called "back-door" system both sides later faced off against each other again in the All-Ireland final on 10 September 2000. D.J. Carey capitalised on an Offaly mistake after just six minutes to start a goal-fest for 'the Cats'. Carey scored 2–4 in all, sharing his second goal with Henry Shefflin who also scored a goal in the second-half. At the full-time whistle Kilkenny were the champions by 5–15 to 1–14 and Barry collected his first All-Ireland medal. He later added a second All-Star award to his collection.

Barry missed Kilkenny's provincial decider victory over Wexford in 2001 with a broken thumb.

Kilkenny bounced back in 2002. Barry won his first National Hurling League medal, as a late Brian Dowling free secured a narrow 2–15 to 2–14 victory. He later collected a third Leinster medal as Kilkenny recorded a narrow 0–19 to 0–17 defeat of fourteen-man Wexford. On 8 September 2002 Barry lined out in the All-Ireland decider as Kilkenny faced first-round losers Clare. Kilkenny forwards Henry Shefflin and D. J. Carey combined to score 2–13 between them, as Kilkenny secured a 2–20 to 0–19 victory. It was Barry's second All-Ireland medal. He was later honoured with his third All-Star award.

In 2003 Barry won a second league medal as Kilkenny came back from eight points down to secure a stunning 5–14 to 5–13 extra-time defeat of Tipperary. He later won a fourth Leinster medal, as Kilkenny defeated Wexford by 2–23 to 2–12. The subsequent All-Ireland final on 14 September 2003 saw Kilkenny face Cork for the first time in four years. Both teams remained level for much of the game, exchanging tit-for-tat scores. A Setanta Ó hAilpín goal gave Cork the advantage, however, a Martin Comerford goal five minutes from the end settled the game as Kilkenny went on to win by 1–14 to 1–11. It was Barry's third All-Ireland medal.

==== Decline ====
After facing a shock, last-minute 2–15 to 1–16 defeat by Wexford in the Leinster semi-final in 2004, Kilkenny worked their way through the qualifiers and lined out against Cork in the All-Ireland decider on 12 September 2004. The game was expected to be a classic, however, a rain-soaked day made conditions difficult as Kilkenny aimed to secure a third successive championship. The first half was a low-scoring affair and provided little excitement for fans, however, the second half saw Cork completely take over. For the last twenty-three minutes Cork scored nine unanswered points and went on to win the game by 0–17 to 0–9.

Kilkenny were back in form in 2005, with Barry, who was now captain of the team, winning a third league medal following a 3–20 to 0–15 victory over Clare. "The Cats" later struggled against a wasteful Wexford side, however, a 0–22 to 1–16 victory gave Barry a fifth Leinster medal. While a third successive All-Ireland showdown with Cork seemed likely, Galway defeated Kilkenny in the All-Ireland semi-final in one of the games of the decade. The game was not without controversy for Barry, as a free-in awarded to him was quickly overturned as a result of back-chatting to referee Séamus Roche. Galway's David Forde scored a goal from the subsequent throw-in.

=== Inter-provincial ===
In 1998 Barry was a non-playing substitute on the Leinster team that narrowly defeated Connacht by 0–16 to 2–9 in the final of the Railway Cup.

== Honours ==
=== Player ===
St Kieran's College

- All-Ireland Colleges' Senior Hurling Championship (1): 1992
- Leinster Colleges' Senior Hurling Championship (2): 1991, 1992

Waterford Regional Technical College

- Fitzgibbon Cup (1): 1995

James Stephens

- All-Ireland Senior Club Hurling Championship (1): 2005 (c)
- Leinster Senior Club Hurling Championship (2): 2004 (c), 2005
- Kilkenny Senior Club Hurling Championship (2): 2004 (c), 2005
- Kilkenny Senior Club Football Championship (4): 1995, 1996, 2003, 2008

Kilkenny

- All-Ireland Senior Hurling Championship (3): 2000, 2002, 2003
- Leinster Senior Hurling Championship (5): 1998, 2000, 2002, 2003, 2005 (c)
- National Hurling League (3): 2002, 2003, 2005
- All-Ireland Under-21 Hurling Championship (1): 1994
- Leinster Under-21 Hurling Championship (2): 1994, 1995

Leinster

- Railway Cup (1): 1998 (sub)

Sporting positions
Preceded by Martin Comerford	Kilkenny Senior Hurling Captain; 2005	Succeeded by Jackie Tyrell
Achievements
Preceded by John McCarthy (Newtownshandrum	All-Ireland Senior Club Hurling Final winning captain 2005	Succeeded by Eugene McEntee (Portumna)
