= Charlie Carter (hurler) =

Irish hurler (born 1971)

Personal information
- Native name: Séarlas Mac Artúir (Irish)
- Born: 19 January 1971 (age 55) Gowran, County Kilkenny, Ireland
- Occupation: Farmer
- Height: 5 ft 8 in (173 cm)

Sport
- Sport: Hurling
- Position: Right corner-forward
Club
- Years: Club
- Young Irelands
Club titles
- Kilkenny titles: 2
Inter-county*
Years	County	Apps (scores)
1990-2003	Kilkenny	29 (6-61)
Inter-county titles
- Leinster titles: 4
- All-Irelands: 3
- NHL: 1
- All Stars: 3
- *Inter County team apps and scores correct as of 23:02, 13 August 2014.

Charles Gerard Carter (born 19 January 1971) is an Irish former hurler who played as a corner-forward at senior level for the Kilkenny county team.

Born in Gowran, County Kilkenny, Carter first played competitive hurling whilst at school at St Kieran's College. He arrived on the inter-county scene at the age of seventeen when he first linked up with the Kilkenny minor team, before later joining the under-21 and junior sides. He made his senior debut during the 1990-91 National League. Carter went on to play a key role for Kilkenny, and won two All-Ireland medals, four Leinster medals and one National Hurling League medal. He was an All-Ireland runner-up on two occasions.

As a member of the Leinster inter-provincial team on a number of occasions, Carter won one Railway Cup medal. At club level he is a two-time championship medallist with Young Irelands.

Throughout his career Carter made 29 championship appearances. He retired from inter-county hurling in controversial circumstances on 7 June 2003.

== Career statistics ==
Team	Year	National League			Leinster		All-Ireland		Total	
Team	Year	Division	Apps	Score	Apps	Score	Apps	Score	Apps	Score
Kilkenny	1990-91	Division 1	x	1-05	1	0-00	x	0-00	x	1-05
Kilkenny	1991-92	Division 1	x	0-02	x	0-00	x	0-00	x	0-02
Kilkenny	1992-93	Division 1	x	0-00	x	0-00	x	0-00	x	0-00
Kilkenny	1993-94	Division 2	x	0-00	0	0-00	—		x	0-00
Kilkenny	1994-95	Division 1	x	0-02	3	0-01	—		x	0-03
Kilkenny	1995-96	Division 1	x	3-16	1	0-00	—		x	3-16
Kilkenny	1997	Division 1	x	2-11	2	0-06	2	0-03	x	2-20
Kilkenny	1998	Division 1B	x	0-03	3	1-12	2	1-02	x	2-17
Kilkenny	1999	Division 1B	x	2-19	2	1-05	2	0-02	x	3-26
Kilkenny	2000	Division 1B	x	0-03	2	2-07	2	1-04	x	3-14
Kilkenny	2001	Division 1B	x	0-04	2	0-13	1	0-01	x	0-18
Kilkenny	2002	Division 1A	x	0-00	2	0-04	2	0-01	x	0-05
Kilkenny	2003	Division 1A	6	4-10	0	0-00	—		6	4-10
Total			x	12-75	18	4-48	11	2-13	x	18-136

Sporting positions
Preceded by Andy Comerford	Kilkenny Senior Hurling Captain; 2003	Succeeded by D.J. Carey
