= Young Irelands GAA (Kilkenny) =

Gaelic Athletic Association Club based in Gowran, Ireland

Young Irelands
- Éire Óg
- Founded: 1952
- County: Kilkenny
- Colours: Red and white
- Grounds: Gowran
- Coordinates: 52°37′46.1″N 7°04′37.0″W 52°37'46.1"N 7°04'37.0"W

Playing kits
Standard colours

Senior Club Championships
	All Ireland	Leinster champions	Kilkenny champions
Hurling:	-	-	2

Young Irelands are a Gaelic Athletic Association Club based in Gowran, County Kilkenny, Ireland. Formed in 1952, they are located on the Chapel Road just outside the village. Their jersey consists of red and white vertical stripes.

They are currently managed by Barry Power. Past managers have included Pat O'Neill and Kevin Fennelly. Their best-known past player is D. J. Carey.

== Honours ==
Young Irelands GAA Club has been Kilkenny Senior Hurling Championship winner on two occasions, 1996 and 2002. It was also a finalist in 1997, 2003 and 2004. It was also Leinster Senior Club Hurling Championship Finalist in 2002, losing to Birr in Portlaoise

- Kilkenny Senior Hurling Championships: (2) 1996, 2002
- Leinster Senior Club Hurling Championships: Runner-Up 2002-03
- Kilkenny Intermediate Hurling Championships: (1) 1992
- Kilkenny Junior Hurling Championships: (1) 1964
- Kilkenny Minor Hurling Championships: (1) 1988

== All Stars ==
- D. J. Carey:
  - 1991, 1992, 1993, 1994, 1995, 1997, 1999, 2000, 2002.
- Charlie Carter
  - 1998, 2000, 2001.
- Pat O'Neill
  - 1993
