= Andy Comerford =

Irish hurling player & manager

Personal information
- Native name: Andrias Comartún (Irish)
- Born: 10 October 1972 (age 54) London, England
- Occupation: Mason
- Height: 6 ft 2 in (188 cm)

Sport
- Sport: Hurling
- Position: Midfield
Clubs
- Years: Club
- O'Loughlin Gaels; Brothers Pearse
Club titles
- Kilkenny titles: 2
- Leinster titles: 1
- All-Ireland Titles: 0
College
- Years: College
- Waterford Regional Technical College
College titles
- Fitzgibbon titles: 1
Inter-county*
Years	County	Apps (scores)
1994-1995 1996-2003	London; Kilkenny	1 (0-00); 23 (2-21)
Inter-county titles
- Leinster titles: 6
- All-Irelands: 3
- NHL: 2
- All Stars: 2
- *Inter County team apps and scores correct as of 22:10, 3 December 2019.

Andrew James Comerford (born 10 October 1972) is an Irish retired hurling manager and former player who played for Kilkenny Senior Championship club O'Loughlin Gaels. He played for the London and Kilkenny senior hurling teams for nearly a decade, during which time he usually lined out at midfield or centre-forward.

Comerford began his hurling career at junior club level with O'Loughlin Gaels. After a brief spell with the Brothers Pearse club in London, he returned to O'Loughlin Gaels and enjoyed his first success as a member of the 1996 Kilkenny Intermediate Championship-winning team and promotion to the top flight of Kilkenny hurling. Comerford later captained the club to the Leinster Club Championship in 2003 as well as two Kilkenny Senior Championships in 2001 and 2003. He made numerous championship appearances in three different grades of hurling for the club, while his early prowess also saw him selected for the Waterford Regional Technical College, with whom he won a Fitzgibbon Cup title..

At inter-county level, Comerford was part of the successful Kilkenny minor team that won the All-Ireland Championship in 1990 before later winning a Leinster Championship with the under-21 team in 1993. A two-year tenure with the London senior team yielded an All-Ireland B Championship in 1995. Comerford joined the Kilkenny senior team in 1996. From his debut, he was a regular at midfield, centre-forward or wing-forward and made a combined total of 53 League and Championship appearances in a career that ended with his last game in 2003. During that time Comerford was part of three All-Ireland Championship-winning teams – in 2000, as captain of the team in 2002 and as a substitute in 2003. He also secured six successive Leinster Championship medals and two National Hurling League medals.

Comerford won his first All-Star in 1999, before claiming a second successive award in 2000. At inter-provincial level, he was selected to play with Leinster on a number of occasions, with his sole Railway Cup medal being won in 2002.

In retirement from playing, Comerford became involved in team management and coaching. At inter-county level he took charge of the Kildare senior hurling team, while he enjoyed championship success with O'Loughlin Gaels at club level.

== Playing career ==
=== St. Kieran's College ===
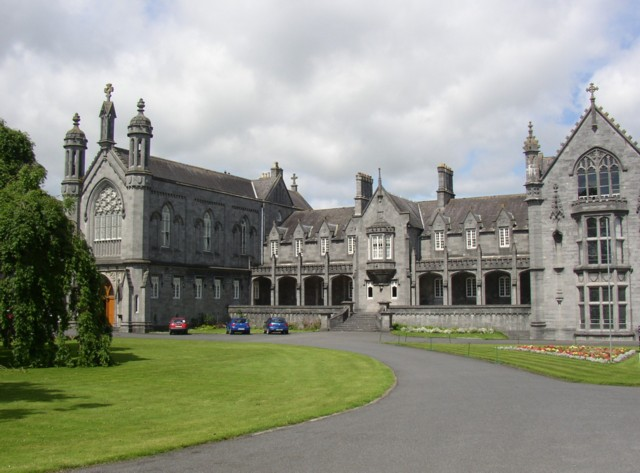
St. Kieran's College.

During his secondary schooling at St. Kieran's College in Kilkenny, Comerford played in all grades of hurling before joining the college's senior hurling team in his final two years. On 15 April 1989, he lined out at right wing-forward when St. Kieran's College drew 1-07 apiece with Birr CBS in the Leinster final. Comerford retained his position for the replay a week later and claimed his first winners' medal following the 2–11 to 1–09 victory. On 7 May 1989, he won an All-Ireland medal after scoring a vital goal from right wing-forward in the 3–05 to 1–09 defeat of St. Flannan's College in the final.

On 1 April 1990, Comerford won a second successive Leinster Championship medal after a 2–09 to 1–07 defeat of local rivals Kilkenny CBS in the final. On 16 May 1990, he lined out at right wing-forward in a second successive All-Ireland final. Comerford scored three points from play and claimed a second successive winners' medal after the 2–10 to 0–07 defeat of St. Flannan's College.

=== Waterford Regional Technical College ===
As a student at the Waterford Regional Technical College, Comerford was a regular on the college senior hurling team. On 8 March 1992, he was listed amongst the substitutes when Waterford RTC faced the University of Limerick in the Fitzgibbon Cup final. Comerford scored two points after coming on as a substitute and claimed a winners' medal after the 1–19 to 1–08 victory.

=== Brothers Pearse ===
During his time in London, Comerford joined the Brothers Pearse club. On 24 September 1995, he lined out at centre-back when Brothers Pearse faced St. Gabriel's in the final, but ended the game on the losing side following a 3–07 to 0–12 defeat.

=== O'Loughlin Gaels ===
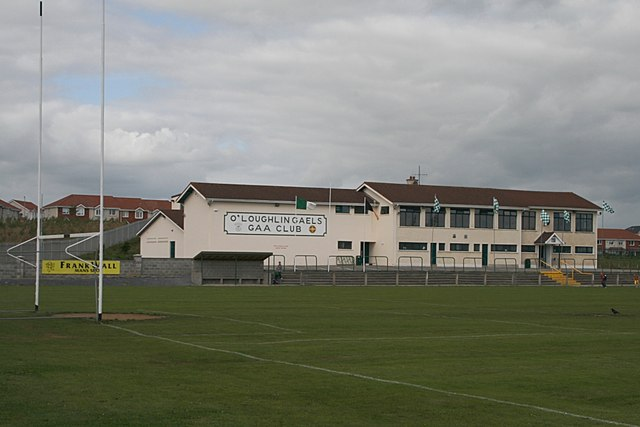
St. John's Park, the O'Loughlin Gaels grounds.

Comerford joined the O'Loughlin Gaels club at a young age and played in all grades at juvenile and underage levels. After returning from London, he joined the club's intermediate team at the start of the 1996 Kilkenny Championship. On 20 October 1996, Comerford lined out at midfield when O'Loughlin Gaels faced Graignamanagh in the championship final. He ended the game with a winners' medal following the 2–13 to 2–08 victory.

On 15 October 2000, Comerford lined out at centre-back when O'Loughlin Gaels qualified to play Graigue-Ballycallan in the Kilkenny Senior Championship final. He ended the game on the losing side following the 0–16 to 0–09 defeat.

Comerford was appointed captain of the O'Loughin Gaels senior team prior to the start of the 2001 Kilkenny Championship. On 14 October 2001, he captained the team to a second successive final appearance against Graigue-Ballycallan. Comerford ended the game with a winners' medal following a 1–17 to 1–06 victory.

On 26 October 2003, Comerford captained O'Loughlin Gaels to a final appearance against Young Irelands. He lined out at centre-back in the 3–09 to 2–12 draw. On 2 November 2003, Comerford won a second winners' medal after captaining the team to a 2–12 to 2–10 victory in the replay. On 30 November 2003, he won a Leinster Championship medal after captaining O'Loughlin Gaels to a 0–15 to 0–09 defeat of Birr in the final.

On 5 November 2006, Comerford once again captained O'Loughlin Gaels when they qualified to play Ballyhale Shamrocks in the final. He ended the game on the losing side after a 1–22 to 2–11 defeat.

=== London ===
Comerford joined the London senior hurling team in advance of the 1994 All-Ireland B Championship. He made his first appearance for the team on 3 July 1994 when he lined out at midfield in the All-Ireland final against Roscommon. Comerford ended the game on the losing side following a 1–10 to 1–09 defeat.

On 2 July 1995, Comerford lined out at midfield in a second successive All-Ireland final. He ended the game with a winners' medal following the 2–07 to 0–08 defeat of Wicklow in what was his last game for London.

=== Kilkenny ===
==== Minor and under-21 ====
Comerford first lined out for Kilkenny as a member of the minor team during the 1990 Leinster Championship. On 8 July 1990, he was listed amongst the substitutes when Kilkenny faced Laois in the Leinster final, however, he was introduced as a 36th-minute substitute for team captain James McDermott at midfield. Comerford scored three points and claimed a winners' medal following the 3–15 to 0–15 victory. On 2 September 1990, he lined out at centre-forward when Kilkenny qualified to play Cork in the All-Ireland final but was held scoreless in the 3-14 apiece draw. Comerford retained his place on the starting fifteen for the replay on 30 September 1990, however, he was switched to right wing-forward. He scored two points from play and claimed an All-Ireland medal after the 3–16 to 0–11 victory.

Comerford was added to the Kilkenny under-21 team in advance of the 1993 Leinster Championship. On 31 July 1993, he won a Leinster Championship medal after scoring two points from right wing-forward in the 4–13 to 2–07 defeat of Wexford in the final. Comerford retained his position at right wing-forward for the All-Ireland final on 12 September 1993. He was held scoreless in the 2–14 to 3–11 draw. Comerford was switched to midfield for the replay on 3 October 1993, however, he ended the game on the losing side after a 2–09 to 3–03 defeat.

==== Senior ====
Comerford was added to the Kilkenny senior hurling panel during the 1996 Oireachtas Cup. On 1 December 1996, he claimed his first silverware at senior level when he won an Oireachtas Cup medal after lining out at left wing-forward in the 0–11 to 1–04 defeat of Clare.

On 9 March 1997, Comerford made his first appearance in the National League when he lined out at centre-forward in a 3–08 to 2–10 defeat by Limerick. He made his Leinster Championship debut on 22 June 1997 when he scored two points from play in the 2–20 to 2–13 defeat of Dublin. On 13 July 1997, Comerford scored a point from midfield when Kilkenny suffered a 2–14 to 1–11 defeat by Wexford in the Leinster final.

On 5 July 1998, Comerford was selected amongst the substitutes when Kilkenny qualified to play Offaly in the Leinster final. He was introduced as a substitute for John Dooley and collected a winners' medal after scoring a point from play in the 3–10 to 1–11 victory. On 13 September 1998, Comerford was back on the starting fifteen and lined out at centre-forward when Kilkenny once again faced Offaly in the All-Ireland final. He scored a point from play before being substituted in the 2–16 to 1–13 defeat.

On 11 July 1999, Comerford won his second Leinster Championship medal after scoring a point from midfield in the 5–14 to 1–16 defeat of Offaly in the final. On 12 September 1999, he was again selected at midfield when Kilkenny qualified for a first All-Ireland final-meeting with Cork in seven years. He scored two points from play but ended the game on the losing side after a 0–13 to 0–12 defeat. Comerford ended the season by winning his first All-Star.

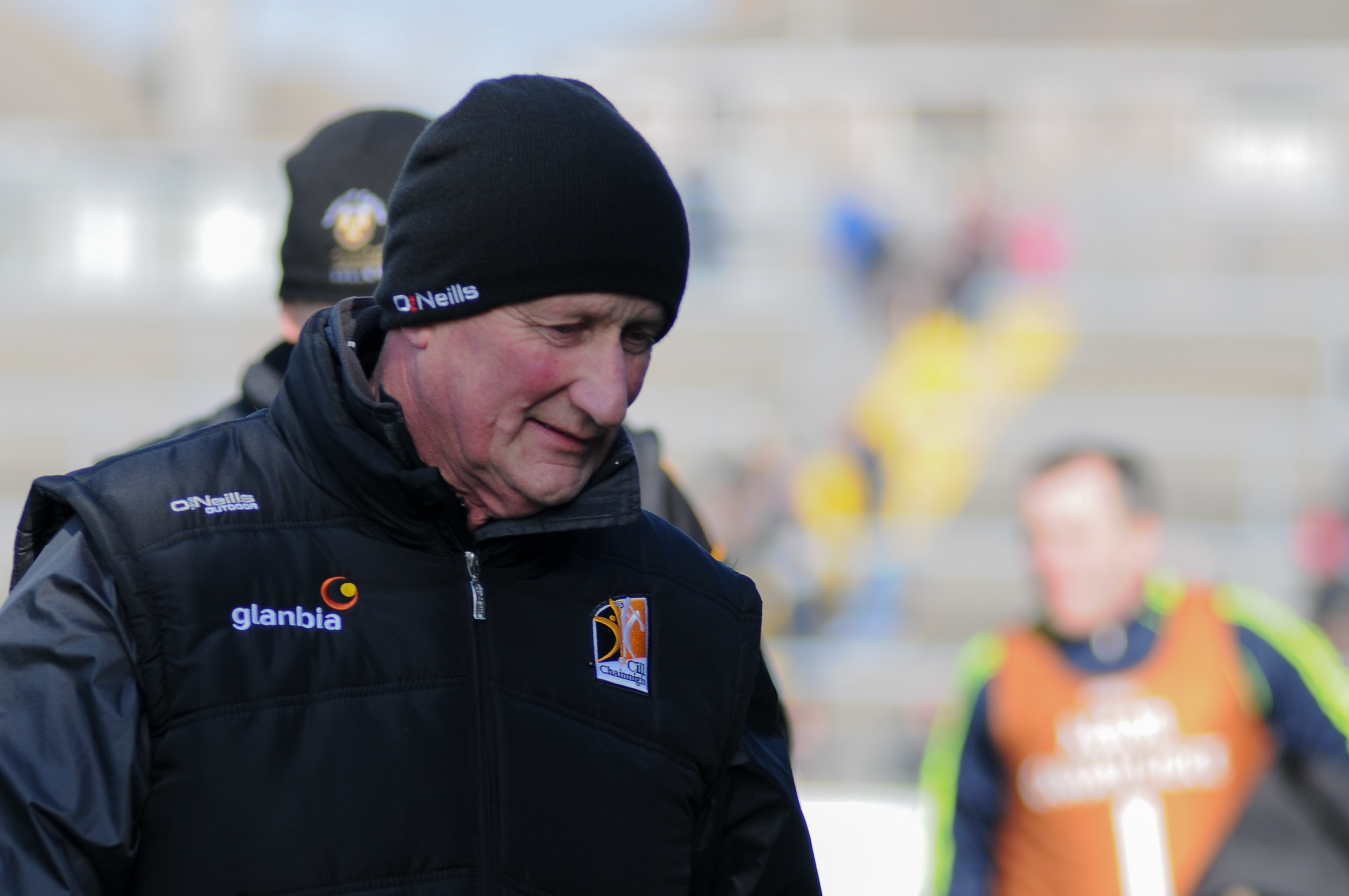
Brian Cody managed Comerford to his three All-Ireland Championship wins.

Comerford lined out in a third consecutive Leinster final on 9 July 2000. He scored a point from midfield and claimed a third consecutive winners' medal after the 2–21 to 1–13 defeat of Offaly. Comerford made his third consecutive All-Ireland final appearance on 10 September 2000, with Offaly once again providing the opposition. He scored a point from play and collected his first All-Ireland medal after the 5–15 to 1–14 victory. He ended the season by winning a second successive All-Star award.

On 8 July 2001, Carey made his fourth successive appearance in a Leinster final. Lining out at midfield he collected a fourth winners' medal after the 2–19 to 0–12 defeat of Wexford.

Comerford was appointed captain of the Kilkenny senior team at the start of the 2002 season. On 5 May 2002, he captained Kilkenny to a National League final appearance against Cork. Comerford scored two points from left wing-forward and collected a winners' medal following the 2–15 to 2–14 victory. On 7 July 2002, Comerford captained Kilkenny to a fifth successive Leinster Championship title after a 0–19 to 0–17 defeat of fourteen-man Wexford. On 8 September 2002, Comerford captained Kilkenny to an All-Ireland final appearance against Clare. He ended the game with a second winners' medal and the honour of lifting the Liam MacCarthy Cup following the 2–20 to 0–19 victory.

On 5 May 2003, Comerford won a second successive National League medal as a non-playing substitute after Kilkenny's 5–14 to 5–13 defeat of Tipperary in the National League final. On 6 July 2003, he won his sixth successive Leinster Championship medal - albeit as an unused substitute - following the 2–23 to 2–12 defeat of Wexford in the final. On 7 September 2003, Comerford was listed amongst the substitutes when Kilkenny faced Cork in the All-Ireland final. He was introduced as a 60th-minute substitute for James Ryall and collected a third All-Ireland winners' medal after the 1–14 to 1–11 victory. Comerford retired from inter-county hurling following this victory.

=== Leinster ===
Comerford also lined out with Leinster in the inter-provincial hurling competition. He was captain of his province in 2002 as Leinster defeated an all-Galway Connacht team, giving him a Railway Cup medal.

== Managerial career ==
=== Kildare ===
On 1 November 2007, Comerford was ratified as manager of the Kildare senior hurling team. His first competitive match in charge was a 2–12 to 0–11 defeat of Roscommon in the 2008 National League. In the subsequent Christy Ring Cup campaign, Comerford's side topped their group before exiting at the quarter-final stage following a 2–22 to 3–13 defeat by Westmeath.

Comerford's second National League campaign in charge saw Kildare finish in second place in the group stage and qualifying for the final. On 2 May 2009, Kildare secured the Division 3A title and promotion after a 2–18 to 1–18 defeat of Meath. For the second year in succession, Comerford's side were defeated at the quarter-final stage of the Christy Ring Cup.

Comerford's third season in charge saw Kildare line out in Division 2 of the National League. His side recorded only one victory in the seven-game group stage before being relegated at the end of the campaign. On 5 June 2010, Comerford guided Kildare to the semi-finals of the Christy Ring Cup for the first time in three years. His side suffered a 3–19 to 0–18 defeat by Westmeath. On 11 June 2010, Comerford stepped down as manager.

=== O'Loughlin Gaels ===
Shortly after stepping down as Kildare manager, Comerford was appointed coach of the O'Loughlin Gaels senior team for the 2010 Kilkenny Championship. On 24 October 2010, he helped guide the team to the championship title following a 0–17 to 1–11 defeat of Carrickshock in the final. On 30 January 2011, O'Loughlin Gaels secured the Leinster Championship title following a 0–14 to 1–08 defeat of Oulart-the Ballagh. On 17 March 2011, Comerford's side qualified for an All-Ireland final meeting with Clarinbridge, however, they suffered a 2–18 to 0–12 defeat.

== Career statistics ==
Team	Year	National League			Leinster		All-Ireland		Total	
Team	Year	Division	Apps	Score	Apps	Score	Apps	Score	Apps	Score
Kilkenny	1997	Division 1	9	0-07	2	0-03	2	0-03	13	0-13
Kilkenny	1998	Division 1B	4	0-02	2	0-01	2	0-04	8	0-07
Kilkenny	1999	Division 1B	6	0-02	2	1-01	2	0-03	10	1-06
Kilkenny	2000	Division 1B	5	0-06	1	0-01	2	1-01	8	1-08
Kilkenny	2001	Division 1B	2	1-01	2	0-01	1	0-00	5	1-02
Kilkenny	2002	Division 1A	2	0-02	2	0-00	2	0-03	6	0-05
Kilkenny	2003	Division 1A	2	0-00	0	0-00	1	0-00	3	0-00
Total			30	1-20	11	1-07	12	1-14	53	3-41

== Honours ==
=== Player ===
St. Kieran's College

- All-Ireland Colleges Senior Hurling Championship (2): 1989, 1990
- Leinster Colleges Senior Hurling Championship (2): 1989, 1990

Waterford Regional Technical College

- Fitzgibbon Cup (1): 1992

O'Loughlin Gaels

- Leinster Senior Club Hurling Championship (1): 2003 (c)
- Kilkenny Senior Hurling Championship (2): 2001 (c), 2003 (c)
- Kilkenny Intermediate Hurling Championship (1): 1996

London

- All-Ireland Senior B Hurling Championship (1): 1995

Kilkenny

- All-Ireland Senior Hurling Championship (3): 2000, 2002 (c), 2003
- Leinster Senior Hurling Championship (6): 1998, 1999, 2000, 2001, 2002, 2003
- National Hurling League (2): 2002 (c), 2003
- Leinster Under-21 Hurling Championship (1): 1993
- All-Ireland Minor Hurling Championship (1): 1990
- Leinster Minor Hurling Championship (1): 1990

Leinster

- Railway Cup (1): 2002

=== Management ===
O'Loughlin Gaels

- Leinster Senior Club Hurling Championship (1): 2010
- Kilkenny Senior Hurling Championship (1): 2010

Kildare

- National League Division 3A (1): 2009

=== Individual ===
Awards

- GAA All-Star Award (2): 1999, 2000

Sporting positions
Preceded by Denis Byrne	Kilkenny Senior Hurling Captain; 2002	Succeeded by Charlie Carter
Preceded by Ben Dorney	Kildare Senior Hurling Manager; 2007-2010	Succeeded by Michael O'Riordan
Achievements
Preceded by Tommy Dunne	All-Ireland Senior Hurling Final winning captain 2002	Succeeded by D.J. Carey
Preceded by Brendan Cummins	Interprovincial Hurling Final winning captain 2002	Succeeded by Michael Kavanagh
