= Brian Dowling (hurler) =

Irish hurler (born 1983)

Personal information
- Native name: Brian Ó Dualaing (Irish)
- Born: 7 March 1983 (age 43) Kilkenny, Ireland
- Occupation: Secondary school teacher
- Height: 5 ft 11 in (180 cm)

Sport
- Sport: Hurling
- Position: Right corner-forward
Club
- Years: Club
- O'Loughlin Gaels
Club titles
- Kilkenny titles: 3
- Leinster titles: 2
College
- Years: College
- 2000–2006: Waterford Institute of Technology
College titles
- Fitzgibbon titles: 3
Inter-county
Years	County	Apps (scores)
2002–2004	Kilkenny	2 (0–1)
Inter-county titles
- Leinster titles: 2
- All-Irelands: 2
- NHL: 2
- All Stars: 0

Brian Martin Dowling (born 7 March 1983) is an Irish hurling manager and former player who has managed the Kildare senior team since 2023.

At club level Dowling played with O'Loughlin Gaels, and also lined out at inter-county level with various Kilkenny teams. He has previously been manager of the Kilkenny senior camogie team.

== Playing career ==
Dowling first played hurling as a schoolboy at St Kieran's College in Kilkenny. He was part of the college team that beat St Flannan's College to win the Croke Cup in 2000. Dowling later studied at Waterford Institute of Technology and won three Fitzgibbon Cup medals, including one as team captain.

At club level, Dowling began his career at juvenile and underage levels with O'Loughlin Gaels. He was just out of the minor grade when he Kilkenny SHC medals in 2001 and 2003. He also won his first Leinster Club SHC medal in 2003. Dowling won a third Kilkenny SHC medal in 2010, before later claiming his second Leinster Club SHC medal. He was a corner-forward when O'Loughlin Gaels were beaten by Clarinbridge in the 2011 All-Ireland Club SHC final.

Dowling first appeared on the inter-county scene with Kilkenny, as a member of the minor team that won the Leinster MHC title in 2001. He subsequently joined his brother Seán on the senior team in 2002, and ended his debut season with a set of National League, Leinster SHC and All-Ireland SHC medals. Dowling was again part of the Kilkenny senior team that retained those three titles in 2003.

As a member of the Kilkenny under-21 team in 2003, Dowling also claimed an All-Ireland U21HC medal that year, after a defeat of Galway. He was dropped from the senior team in February 2004. In spite of this, Dowling claimed a second successive All-Ireland U21HC medal in 2004, in what was his last game in a Kilkenny jersey.

== Coaching career ==
=== Early days ===
Dowling first became involved in coaching in his capacity as a teacher at Coláiste Éanna in Dublin. He also enjoyed underage success with O'Loughlin Gaels, having been a selector with the under-21 team that claimed the Kilkenny U21HC title in 2015. After transferring to St Kieran's College, Dowling helped his alma mater to the All-Ireland Colleges JHC title in 2019, before helping the college win the All-Ireland Colleges SHC title in 2023.

Dowling joined Ann Downey's Kilkenny senior camogie management team as a coach and selector in 2019, before succeeding her as manager a year later. His debut season saw Kilkenny beat Galway to claim the All-Ireland SCC title. Dowling guided Kilkenny to a second All-Ireland SCC title during his tenure in 2022. He stepped down as manager after a defeat by Cork in the 2023 All-Ireland SCC quarter-final.

=== Kildare ===
In September 2023, Dowling began managing the Kildare senior hurling team.

== Honours ==
=== Player ===
St Kieran's College

- All-Ireland Colleges Senior Hurling Championship: 2000
- Leinster Colleges Senior Hurling Championship: 2000

Waterford Institute of Technology

- Fitzgibbon Cup: 2002, 2003, 2006 (c)

O'Loughlin Gaels

- Leinster Senior Club Hurling Championship: 2003, 2010
- Kilkenny Senior Hurling Championship: 2001, 2003, 2010

Kilkenny

- All-Ireland Senior Hurling Championship: 2002, 2003
- Leinster Senior Hurling Championship: 2002, 2003
- National Hurling League: 2002, 2003
- All-Ireland Under-21 Hurling Championship: 2003, 2004
- Leinster Under-21 Hurling Championship: 2003, 2004
- Leinster Minor Hurling Championship: 2001

=== Management ===
Coláiste Éanna

- Leinster Colleges Senior B Hurling Championship: 2009

St Kieran's College

- All-Ireland PPS Senior Hurling Championship: 2023, 2024, 2026
- Leinster PPS Senior Hurling Championship: 2024, 2025, 2026
- All-Ireland Colleges Junior Hurling Championship: 2018
- Leinster PPS Junior Hurling Championship: 2018, 2019

O'Loughlin Gaels

- Kilkenny Under-21 Hurling Championship: 2015

Kilkenny

- All-Ireland Senior Camogie Championship: 2020, 2022
- Leinster Senior Camogie Championship: 2019, 2022, 2023
- National Camogie League: 2021

Sporting positions
Preceded by Ann Downey	Kilkenny senior camogie team manager 2019–2022	Succeeded by Peter "Chap" Cleere
Preceded by David Herity	Kildare senior hurling team manager 2023–present	Succeeded by Incumbent
Achievements
Preceded by Cathal Murray	All-Ireland SCC winning manager 2020	Succeeded by Cathal Murray
Preceded by Cathal Murray	All-Ireland SCC winning manager 2022	Succeeded by Matthew Twomey
Preceded by Seoirse Bulfin	Christy Ring Cup winning manager 2024	Succeeded by Neil Rogers
Preceded by Johnny Kelly	Joe McDonagh Cup winning manager 2025	Succeeded by Incumbent
