= Seán Dowling =

Irish hurler (born 1978)

Personal information
- Native name: Seán Ó Dúllaing (Irish)
- Born: 10 June 1978 (age 48) Kilkenny, Ireland
- Height: 6 ft 1 in (185 cm)

Sport
- Sport: Hurling
- Position: Right wing-back
Club
- Years: Club
- 1994-2010: O'Loughlin Gaels
Club titles
- Kilkenny titles: 2
- Leinster titles: 1
Inter-county*
Years	County	Apps (scores)
2001–2005	Kilkenny	19 (0-05)
Inter-county titles
- Leinster titles: 3
- All-Irelands: 2
- NHL: 3
- All Stars: 0
- *Inter County team apps and scores correct as of 22:26, 9 April 2020.

Seán Anthony Dowling (born 10 June 1978) is an Irish retired hurler who played for Kilkenny Championship club O'Loughlin Gaels. He played for the Kilkenny senior hurling team for five seasons, during which time he usually lined out as a right wing-back or at midfield.

== Career ==
Dowling began his hurling career at club level with O'Loughlin Gaels. He broke onto the club's top adult team as a 16-year-old in 1994 and enjoyed his first success the following year when the club won the 1995 Kilkenny Junior Championship. He won a Kilkenny Intermediate Championship title in 1996 and promotion to the top flight of Kilkenny hurling. Dowling went on to make numerous championship appearances at senior level and was at left wing-back on O'Loughlin Gaels' Leinster Club Championship-winning team in 2003. His club career ended as a result of a hip injury in 2010, by which time he had also won two Kilkenny Senior Championship titles.

At inter-county level, Dowling was part of the Kilkenny minor team that won back-to-back Leinster Minor Championships in 1995 and 1996 before winning the All-Ireland Under-21 Championship in 1999. He joined the Kilkenny senior team in 2001. From his debut, Dowling lined out as a half-back or a midfielder and made a combined total of 25 National League and Championship appearances in a career that ended with his last game in 2005. During that time he was part of two All-Ireland Championship-winning teams – in 2002 and 2003. Dowling also secured three successive Leinster Championship medals and three National Hurling League medals. He was dropped from the panel in June 2005.

== Career statistics ==
Team	Year	National League			Leinster		All-Ireland		Total	
Team	Year	Division	Apps	Score	Apps	Score	Apps	Score	Apps	Score
Kilkenny	2001	Division 1B	5	0-00	1	0-00	0	0-00	6	0-00
Kilkenny	2002	Division 1A	2	0-00	1	0-00	0	0-00	3	0-00
Kilkenny	2003	Division 1A	2	0-00	1	0-02	2	0-00	5	0-02
Kilkenny	2004	Division 1A	3	0-01	1	0-02	4	0-01	8	0-04
Kilkenny	2005	Division 1A	3	0-00	0	0-00	—		3	0-00
Total			15	0-01	4	0-04	6	0-01	25	0-06

== Honours ==
O'Loughlin Gaels

- Leinster Senior Club Hurling Championship (1): 2003
- Kilkenny Senior Hurling Championship (2): 2001, 2002
- Kilkenny Intermediate Hurling Championship (1): 1996
- Kilkenny Junior Hurling Championship (1): 1995

Kilkenny

- All-Ireland Senior Hurling Championship (2): 2002, 2003
- Leinster Senior Hurling Championship (3): 2001, 2002, 2003
- National Hurling League (3): 2002, 2003, 2005
- All-Ireland Under-21 Hurling Championship (1): 1999
- Leinster Under-21 Hurling Championship (2): 1998, 1999
- Leinster Minor Hurling Championship (2): 1995, 1996
