= 2000 Kilkenny Senior Hurling Championship =

Annual hurling competition season

- Dates: 19 August 2000 – 22 October 2000
- Teams: 12
- Sponsor: St. Canice's Credit Union
- Champions: Graigue-Ballycallan (2nd title); James Young (captain)
- Runners-up: O'Loughlin Gaels; Eugene Furlong (captain)
- Relegated: Clara

Tournament statistics
- Matches played: 15
- Goals scored: 31 (2.07 per match)
- Points scored: 348 (23.2 per match)
- Top scorer(s): Nigel Skehan (2-23)

The 2000 Kilkenny Senior Hurling Championship was the 106th staging of the Kilkenny Senior Hurling Championship since its establishment by the Kilkenny County Board in 1887. The championship began on 19 August 2000 and ended on 22 October 2000.

Glenmore were the defending champions, however, they were defeated by O'Loughlin Gaels at the semi-final stage.

On 15 October 2000, Graigue-Ballycallan won the title after a 0–16 to 0–09 defeat of O'Loughlin Gaels in the final at Nowlan Park. It was their second championship title overall and their first title in two championship seasons. It remains their last championship triumph.

Nigel Skehan of the O'Loughlin Gaels club was the championship's top scorer with 2-23.

== Team changes ==
=== To Championship ===
Promoted from the Kilkenny Intermediate Hurling Championship

- John Locke's

=== From Championship ===
Relegated to the Kilkenny Intermediate Hurling Championship

- St. Martin's

== Results ==
=== First round ===
19 August 2000 First round	Ballyhale Shamrocks	2-13 - 1-13	John Locke's	Hugginstown
	H Shefflin 1-6, P Reid 1-1, B Aylward 0-3, D Hoyne 0-1, L Grant 0-1, C Harrington 0-1.		A Power 0-5, D Lynch 1-0, R Jackman 0-4, J O'Neill 0-1, J Power 0-1, M Dunne 0-1, PJ Cody 0-1.

19 August 2000 First round	O'Loughlin Gaels	1-14 - 0-12	Clara	Nowlan Park, Kilkenny
	N Skehan 1-10, J Daly 0-1, B Dowling 0-1, J Comerford 0-1, B Kelly 0-1.		R Moore 0-8, G Byrne 0-1, G Prendergast 0-1, J Casey 0-1, B Phelan 0-1.

20 August 2000 First round	Glenmore	0-12 - 0-09	James Stephens	Thomastown
	D Mullally 0-6, W Fitzgerald 0-2, P Fitzgerald 0-2, R Mullally 0-2.		J Murray 0-3, K Grogan 0-2, P Larkin 0-2, P O'Brien 0-1, P Barry 0-1.	Referee: J Guinan (St. Lachtain's)

20 August 2000 First round	Erin's Own	1-08 - 0-08	Fenians	Ballyragget
	B Young 1-0, D Buggy 0-3, J Feehan 0-2, J Brennan 0-2, G Byrne 0-1.		E Behan 0-4, P Delaney 0-1, P Quinlan 0-1, Jimmy Brennan 0-1, S Grehan 0-1.

=== Relegation play-offs ===
30 September 2000 Semi-final	James Stephens	2-12 - 0-11	Clara	Freshford
	J Murray 2-2, R Manogue 0-7, P Larkin 0-2, K Gorgan 0-1.		R Moore 0-7, B Barcoe 0-1, R Shortall 0-1, P Fitzgerald 0-1, D McDonald 0-1.

30 September 2000 Semi-final	John Locke's	2-12 - 0-15	Fenians	St. John's Park, Kilkenny
	J Power 1-5, D Lynch 1-3, J Gormley 0-2, J O'Neill 0-1, PJ Cody 0-1.		E Behan 0-8, K Power 0-4, B Power 0-1, P Delaney 0-1, Brian Ryan 0-1.

22 October 2000 Final	Fenians	1-13 - 1-09	Clara	Ballyragget
	E Behan 0-6, Brendan Ryan 1-2, K Power 0-3, Brian Ryan 0-2.		R Moore 0-8, E Phelan 1-0, J Casey 0-1.

=== Quarter-finals ===
23 September 2000 Quarter-final	O'Loughlin Gaels	0-14 - 1-07	Young Irelands	Nowlan Park, Kilkenny
	N Skehan 0-6, J Daly 0-3, M Comerford 0-3, B Dowling 0-2.		DJ Carey 1-3, P O'Neill 0-1, T Drennan 0-1, C Carter 0-1, D Carroll 0-1.

23 September 2000 Quarter-final	Glenmore	1-11 - 0-14	Dicksboro	Thomastown
	D Mullally 0-7, J Phelan 1-1, S Dollard 0-1, P Fitzgerald 0-1, M Murphy 0-1.		D O'Neill 0-11, C O'Loughlin 0-2, S Morrissey 0-1.

23 September 2000 Quarter-final	Graigue-Ballycallan	6-12 - 3-06	Erin's Own	Nowlan Park, Kilkenny
	J Hoyne 2-3, A Ronan 2-2, T Dermody 1-2, M Hoyne 0-3, D Byrne 0-1, E Brennan 0-1.		B Young 2-2, M Coogan 1-0, J Feehan 0-2, G Rothwell 0-1, G Byrne 0-1.

24 September 2000 Quarter-final	Ballyhale Shamrocks	3-11 - 1-14	Tullaroan	John Locke Park, Callan
	H Shefflin 1-6, P Reid 1-0, L Grant 1-0, A Cummins 0-2, T Shefflin 0-1, N O'Keeffe 0-1, D Hoyne 0-1.		J Coogan 0-10, L Keoghan 1-1, P Doheny 0-1, T Walsh 0-1, S Hennessy 0-1.

30 September 2000 Quarter-final replay	Glenmore	0-10 - 1-12	Dicksboro	Nowlan Park, Kilkenny
	R Heffernan 0-3, D Mullally 0-3, J Phelan 0-2, P Mullally 0-1, S Dollard 0-1.		A Barry 1-3, J O'Gorman 0-3, D O'Neill 0-2, D Carroll 0-1, C O'Loughlin 0-1, S Kennedy 0-1, S Morrissey 0-1.	Referee: E McMahon (Cloneen)

=== Semi-finals ===
1 October 2000 Semi-final	Graigue-Ballycallan	2-15 - 1-12	Ballyhale Shamrocks	Nowlan Park, Kilkenny
	E Brennan 1-2, A Ronan 0-4, J Young 1-0, T Dermody 0-3, D Byrne 0-3, M Hoyne 0-2, J Hoyne 0-1.		H Shefflin 0-6, B Aylward 0-4, N O'Keeffe 1-0, L Grant 0-2.	Referee: P Dunphy

8 October 2000 Semi-final	O'Loughlin Gaels	2-16 - 0-08	Dicksboro	Nowlan Park, Kilkenny
	B Dowling 1-3, N Skehan 1-2, A Geoghegan 0-3, J Daly 0-2, J Holohan 0-1, A Comerford 0-1, C Furlong 0-1, B Kelly 0-1, J Comerford 0-1, B Hogan 0-1.		D O'Neill 0-4, A Barry 0-2, B Barry 0-1, J O'Gorman 0-1.

=== Final ===
15 October 2000 Final	Graigue-Ballycallan	0-16 - 0-09	O'Loughlin Gaels	Nowlan Park, Kilkenny
	D Byrne 0-4, M Hoyne 0-3, A Ronan 0-3, J Young 0-3, E Brennan 0-2, J Young 0-1.		N Skehan 0-5, A Geoghegan 0-1, B Kelly 0-1, S Dowling 0-1, B Dowling 0-1.

== Championship statistics ==
=== Top scorers ===
Overall

Rank	Player	County	Tally	Total	Matches	Average
1	Nigel Skehan	O'Loughlin Gaels	2-23	29	4	7.25
2	Henry Shefflin	Ballyhale Shamrocks	2-18	24	3	8.00
3	Rory Moore	Clara	0-23	23	3	7.66
4	Eoin Behan	Fenians	0-18	18	3	6.00
5	Dan O'Neill	Dicksboro	0-17	17	3	5.66
6	Denis Mullally	Glenmore	0-16	16	3	5.33
7	Adrian Ronan	Graigue-Ballycallan	2-09	15	3	5.00
8	Brian Young	Erin's Own	3-02	11	2	5.50
8	Joe Murray	James Stephens	2-05	11	2	5.50
9	John Hoyne	Graigue-Ballycallan	2-04	10	3	3.33
9	Brian Dowling	O'Loughlin Gaels	1-07	10	4	2.50
9	Jimmy Coogan	Tullaroan	0-10	10	1	10.00

Single game

Rank	Player	County	Tally	Total	Opposition
1	Nigel Skehan	O'Loughlin Gaels	1-10	13	Clara
2	Dan O'Neill	Dicksboro	0-11	11	Glenmore
3	Jimmy Coogan	Tullaroan	0-10	10	Ballyhale Shamrocks
4	John Hoyne	Graigue-Ballycallan	2-03	9	Erin's Own
4	Henry Shefflin	Ballyhale Shamrocks	1-06	9	John Locke's
4	Henry Shefflin	Ballyhale Shamrocks	1-06	9	Tullaroan
5	Joe Murray	James Stephens	2-02	8	Clara
5	Adrian Ronan	Graigue-Ballycallan	2-02	8	Erin's Own
5	Brian Young	Erin's Own	2-02	8	Graigue-Ballycallan
5	John Power	John Locke's	1-05	8	Fenians
5	Rory Moore	Clara	0-08	8	O'Loughlin Gaels
5	Eoin Behan	Fenians	0-08	8	John Locke's
5	Rory Moore	Clara	0-08	8	Fenians

=== Miscellaneous ===
- O'Loughlin Gaels qualified for the final for the first time.
