= 2002 Kilkenny Senior Hurling Championship =

Annual hurling competition season

- Dates: 26 July 2002 – 27 October 2002
- Teams: 12
- Sponsor: St. Canice's Credit Union
- Champions: Young Irelands (2nd title); Martin Carey (captain)
- Runners-up: Dunnamaggin; Noel Lahart (captain)

Tournament statistics
- Top scorer(s): D. J. Carey (5-19)

The 2002 Kilkenny Senior Hurling Championship was the 108th staging of the Kilkenny Senior Hurling Championship since its establishment by the Kilkenny County Board.

O'Loughlin Gaels were the defending champions.

On 27 October 2002, Young Irelands won the title after a 3–14 to 1–15 defeat of Dunnamaggin in the final at Nowlan Park. It was their second championship title overall and their first title in six championship seasons. It remains their last championship triumph.

== Team changes ==
=== To Championship ===
Promoted from the Kilkenny Intermediate Hurling Championship

- Mullinavat

=== From Championship ===
Relegated to the Kilkenny Intermediate Hurling Championship

- John Locke's

== Results ==
=== First round ===
26 July 2002 First round	O'Loughlin Gaels	1-18 - 0-10	Mullinavat	John Locke Park, Callan
	N Skehan 0-11, B Kelly 1-1, B Dowling 0-3, J Daly 0-2, A Geoghegan 0-1.		W O'Dwyer 0-5, Michael Murphy 0-4, D Conway 0-1.

28 July 2002 First round	Ballyhale Shamrocks	1-13 - 0-15	Dicksboro	Thomastown
	D Hoyne 1-1, H Shefflin 0-3, A Cummins 0-2, B Aylward 0-2, R Aylward 0-1, T Shefflin 0-1, P Reid 0-1, B Costello 0-1, J Fitzpatrick 0-1.		D O'Gorman 0-4, S Morrissey 0-3, D O'Neill 0-3, J O'Gorman 0-2, B Dalton 0-1, C O'Loughlin 0-1, S Prendergast 0-1.

27 July 2002 First round	Graigue-Ballycallan	1-19 - 1-14	Glenmore	Ballyhale Sportsfield, Ballyhale
	A Ronan 0-11, PJ Pollard 1-0, E Brennan 0-3, D Byrne 0-2, J Ryall 0-2, J Young 0-1.		D Mullally 1-3, P Mullally 0-5, M Phelan 0-2, S Vereker 0-1, S Dollard 0-1, J Phelan 0-1, PJ O'Connor 0-1.

28 July 2002 First round	Dunnamaggin	3-13 - 1-07	Erin's Own	Palmerstown
	K O'Shea 1-3, R Cahill 1-3, S O'Neill 1-1, D Lahart 0-2, C Herity 0-1, K Moore 0-1, L Heffernan 0-1, S Ryan 0-1.		B Young 1-2, D Buggy 0-3, C Dunne 0-1, J Buggy 0-1.

=== Relegation play-off ===
Play-off	Dicksboro	2-10 - 1-11	Erin's Own
	S Morrissey 1-2, D O'Neill 0-5, J Treacy 1-0, B Dalton 0-2, T Bawle 0-1.		B Young 0-6, E Rothwell 1-2, M Owens 0-1, D Buggy 0-1, D Byrne 0-1.

=== Quarter-finals ===
21 September 2002 Quarter-final	James Stephens	2-11 - 0-16	Ballyhale Shamrocks	Thomastown
	J Murray 1-6, N Brennan 1-0, B McEvoy 0-2, E McCormack 0-2, G Whelan 0-1.		J Fitzpatrick 0-6, D Hoyne 0-4, H Shefflin 0-3, P Reid 0-1, T Shefflin 0-1, B Costello 0-1.

21 September 2002 Quarter-final	O'Loughlin Gaels	1-10 - 1-10	Fenians	Freshford
	N Skehan 0-5, B Dowling 1-1, P Delaney 1-0, S Dowling 0-2, M Comerford 0-1, A Geoghegan 0-1.		PJ Delaney 1-0, B Ryan 0-3, K Power 0-2, S Grehan 0-2, E Behan 0-2, B Power 0-1.

21 September 2002 Quarter-final	Dunnamaggin	1-12 - 0-11	Tullaroan	John Locke Park, Callan
	R Cahill 0-5, K O'Shea 1-0, K Moore 0-2, E Kennedy 0-2, S Ryan 0-1, P Cahill 0-1, D Lahart 0-1.		J Coogan 0-3, B Teehan 0-2, S Hennessy 0-2, D Gaffney 0-1, C Maher 0-1, M Walsh 0-1, T Walsh 0-1.

22 September 2002 Quarter-final	Young Irelands	5-09 - 1-15	Graigue-Ballycallan	Nowlan Park, Kilkenny
	DJ Carey 3-4, D Carroll 1-2, J Carey 1-0, C Carter 0-2, D Carter 0-1.		A Ronan 0-7, E Brennan 1-0, J Hoyne 0-3, G Cleere 0-2, D Hoyne 0-1, D Byrne 0-1, D Cleere 0-1.

28 September 2002 Quarter-final replay	O'Loughlin Gaels	1-25 - 3-20	Fenians	Freshford
	N Skehan 1-13, J Comerford 0-4, B Dowling 0-2, B Kelly 0-2, A Comerford 0-1, C Furlong 0-1, M Comerford 0-1, A Geoghegan 0-1.		B Power 1-2, B Ryan 1-1, S Grehan 0-4, PJ Delaney 1-0, E Behan 0-3, L Ryan 0-2, B Ryan 0-2, P Delaney 0-2, K Power 0-2, P Quinlan 0-1, J Whelan 0-1.

=== Semi-finals ===
6 October 2002 Semi-final	Young Irelands	0-17 - 0-16	James Stephens	Nowlan Park, Kilkenny
	DJ Carey 0-8, C Carter 0-4, O Carter 0-1, J Carey 0-1, D Carter 0-1, J Fitzgerald 0-1, D Carroll 0-1.		J Murray 0-10, B McEvoy 0-4, E Larkin 0-1, T O'Dowd 0-1.

6 October 2002 Semi-final	Fenians	1-13 - 2-10	Dunnamaggin	Nowlan Park, Kilkenny
	P Quinlan 1-1, K Power 0-4, E Behan 0-3, S Grehan 0-2, Brian Ryan 0-1, Brendan Ryan 0-1.		K O'Shea 2-1, S O'Neill 0-3, R Cahill 0-3, K Moore 0-1, S Ryan 0-1, E Kennedy 0-1.

12 October 2002 Semi-final replay	Fenians	3-14 - 3-17	Dunnamaggin	Nowlan Park, Kilkenny
	K Power 0-7, P Quinlan 1-2, P Delaney 1-1, E Behan 0-3, L Ryan 1-0, B Power 0-1.		C Herity 0-10, K O'Shea 2-1, P Cahill 1-1, S Ryan 0-2, R Cahill 0-2, S O'Neill 0-1.

=== Final ===
27 October 2002 Final	Young Irelands	3-14 - 1-15	Dunnamaggin	Nowlan Park, Kilkenny
	DJ Carey 2-7 (0-2f), D Carroll 1-0, D Carter, C Carter 0-2 each, J McDermott, J Fitzgerald, J Carey 0-1 each.		C Herrity 0-7 (7f), S Ryan 1-0, R Cahill 0-2, K Moore, P Cahill, S O'Neill, N Lahart, K O'Shea, E Kennedy ('65') 0-1 each.	Referee: P Dunphy (Carrigeen)

== Championship statistics ==
=== Top scorers ===
Overall

Rank	Player	County	Tally	Total	Matches	Average
1	D. J. Carey	Young Irelands	5-19	34	3	11.33
2	Nigel Skehan	O'Loughlin Gaels	1-29	32	3	10.66
3	Ken O'Shea	Dunnamaggin	6-06	24	5	4.80

Single game

Rank	Player	County	Tally	Total	Opposition
1	Nigel Skehan	O'Loughlin Gaels	1-13	16	Fenians
2	D. J. Carey	Young Irelands	3-04	13	Graigue-Ballycallan
2	D. J. Carey	Young Irelands	2-07	13	Dunnamaggin
3	Nigel Skehan	O'Loughlin Gaels	0-11	11	Mullinavat
3	Adrian Ronan	Graigue-Ballycallan	0-11	11	Glenmore
4	James Murray	James Stephens	0-10	10	Young Irelands
4	Colin Herity	Dunnamaggin	0-10	10	Fenians
5	James Murray	James Stephens	1-06	9	Ballyhale Shamrocks
6	D. J. Carey	Young Irelands	0-08	8	James Stephens
7	Ken O'Shea	Dunnamaggin	2-01	7	Fenians
7	Ken O'Shea	Dunnamaggin	2-01	7	Fenians
7	Adrian Ronan	Graigue-Ballycallan	0-07	7	Young Irelands
7	Kevin Power	Fenians	0-07	7	Dunnamaggin
7	Colin Herity	Dunnamaggin	0-07	7	Young Irelands

== Championship statistics ==
=== Miscellaneous ===
- The final was originally scheduled for 20 October 2002, however, a waterlogged Nowlan Park resulted in a postponement.
