= 2003 Kilkenny Senior Hurling Championship =

Annual hurling competition season

- Dates: 25 July 2003 – 2 November 2003
- Teams: 12
- Sponsor: St. Canice's Credit Union
- Champions: O'Loughlin Gaels (2nd title); Andy Comerford (captain); Michael Nolan (manager)
- Runners-up: Young Irelands; Jack Carey (captain); John Brennan (manager)
- Relegated: Mullinavat

Tournament statistics
- Matches played: 14
- Goals scored: 40 (2.86 per match)
- Points scored: 360 (25.71 per match)
- Top scorer(s): Nigel Skehan (5-22)

The 2003 Kilkenny Senior Hurling Championship was the 109th staging of the Kilkenny Senior Hurling Championship since its establishment by the Kilkenny County Board in 1887. The championship began on 25 July 2003 and ended on 2 November 2003.

Young Irelands were the defending champions.

On 2 November 2003, O'Loughlin Gaels won the title after a 2–12 to 2–10 defeat of Young Irelands in a final replay at Nowlan Park. It was their second championship title overall and their first title in two championship seasons.

== Team changes ==
=== To Championship ===
Promoted from the Kilkenny Intermediate Hurling Championship

- St. Martin's

=== From Championship ===
Relegated to the Kilkenny Intermediate Hurling Championship

- Erin's Own

== Results ==
=== First round ===
First round	Fenians	4-13 - 1-14	St. Martin's
	B Power 2-3, P Quinlan 2-2, K Power 0-3, L Ryan 0-2, S Grehan 0-1, B Ryan 0-1, E Behan 0-1.		D Lawlor 1-9, P Maher 0-3, J Dooley 0-1, N Moloney 0-1.

First round	James Stephens	0-23 - 0-14	Dunnamaggin
	J Murray 0-7, B McEvoy 0-3, E McCormack 0-3, L O'Connor 0-3, D Cody 0-3, P Barry 0-1, G Whelan 0-1, T O'Dowd 0-1, E Larkin 0-1.		R Cahill 0-5, S O'Neill 0-3, E Kennedy 0-2, S Ryan 0-2, D Lahart 0-1, K O'Shea 0-1.

First round	Dicksboro	2-14 - 2-14	Mullinavat
	E O'Donoghue 1-9, S Morrissey 1-1, C O'Loughlin 0-2, B Dalton 0-1, A Barry 0-1.		M Murphy 0-8, W O'Dwyer 1-4, J Walsh 1-0, S Holden 0-1, A McGovern 0-1.

First round	Tullaroan	2-24 - 1-18	Glenmore
	M Walsh 1-2, T Walsh 0-5, B Teehan 0-5, L Keoghan 1-1, J Coogan 0-4, T Fitzgerald 0-3, P Doheny 0-2, N Sweeney 0-2.		M Phelan 0-10, M Murphy 1-0, J Phelan 0-3, P Mullally 0-1, W O'Connor 0-1, MT Phelan 0-1, P Murphy 0-1, W Fitzgerald 0-1.

First round replay	Dicksboro	2-09 - 0-09	Mullinavat
	J O'Gorman 2-0, E O'Donoghue 0-6, S Morrissey 0-2, D O'Neill 0-1.		M Murphy 0-4, J Roughan 0-2, C Conway 0-2, A McGovern 0-1.

=== Relegation play-off ===
4 October 2003 Play-off	Dunnamaggin	3-11 - 1-09	Mullinavat

=== Quarter-finals ===
Quarter-final	Graigue-Ballycallan	1-13 - 0-03	Dicksboro
	E Brennan 0-7, J Hoyne 1-0, G Cleere 0-2, A Ronan 0-2, E O'Dwyer 0-1, K Cleere 0-1.		S Morrissey 0-1, S Prendergast 0-1, D O'Neill 0-1.

Quarter-final	James Stephens	0-18 - 1-14	Ballyhale Shamrocks
	J Murray 0-12, E McCormack 0-2, G Whelan 0-1, B McEvoy 0-1, P O'Brien 0-1, J Tyrrell 0-1.		H Shefflin 0-8, E Reid 1-2, J Fitzpatrick 0-3, B Aylward 0-1.

Quarter-final	Young Irelands	1-17 - 2-09	Fenians
	C Carter 0-7, DJ Carey 1-2, D Carter 0-5, D Carroll 0-2, J Fitzgerald 0-1.		K Power 1-6, L Ryan 1-2, P Quinlan 0-1.

Quarter-final	O'Loughlin Gaels	1-10 - 0-12	Tullaroan
	N Skehan 1-7, B Dowling 0-3.		J Coogan 0-7, M Walsh 0-2, T Walsh 0-1, S Hennessy 0-1, T Fitzgerald 0-1.

=== Semi-finals ===
Semi-final	Young Irelands	2-18 - 1-06	Graigue-Ballycallan	Nowlan Park, Kilkenny
	D Carter 1-5, DJ Carey 0-6, J Carey 1-0, D Carroll 0-3, O Carter 0-2, C Carter 0-2.		A Ronan 0-4, D Cleere 1-0, E O'Dwyer 0-1, J Hoyne 0-1.

Semi-final	O'Loughlin Gaels	2-13 - 2-12	James Stephens	Nowlan Park, Kilkenny
	N Skehan 1-5, J Comerford 1-0, S Dowling 0-2, A Geoghegan 0-2, B Kelly 0-1, S Cummins 0-1, M Comerford 0-1, B Dowling 0-1.		J Murray 0-6, E McCormack 0-4, R Hayes 1-0, E Larkin 1-0, P O'Brien 0-1, B McEvoy 0-1.

=== Final ===
26 October 2003 Final	O'Loughlin Gaels	3-09 - 2-12	Young Irelands	Nowlan Park, Kilkenny
	N Skehan 2-3 (1-2 frees), B Dowling 1-2, M Nolan 0-2, M Comerford and N Bergin 0-1 each.		DJ Carey 1-3 (0-3 frees), C Carter 0-4, J Carey 1-1, J Fitzgerald, O Carter, J McDermott and D Carroll 0-1 each.	Referee: D o'Sullivan (Callan)

2 November 2003 Final replay	O'Loughlin Gaels	2-12 - 2-10	Young Irelands	Nowlan Park, Kilkenny
	N Skehan (1-7); S Cummins (1-0), A Geoghegan (0-2); A Comerford (0-1), S Dowling (0-1); B Dowling (0-1).		DJ Carey (1-7), D Carroll (1-1), C Carter (0-2).	Referee: P Dunphy (Carrigeen)

== Championship statistics ==
=== Top scorers ===
Top scorers overall

Rank	Player	Club	Tally	Total	Matches	Average
1	Nigel Skehan	O'Loughlin Gaels	5-22	37	4	9.25
2	D. J. Carey	Young Irelands	3-18	27	4	6.75
3	Joe Murray	James Stephens	0-25	25	3	8.33
