= Michael Cleere =

Irish hurler

Michael Cleere (born 10 November 1960) is an Irish retired hurler, who played for the Kilkenny Championship club O'Loughlin Gaels. He also played for the Kilkenny senior hurling team for a brief period, during which time he usually lined out as a forward.
