= 2026 Croke Cup =

Irish hurling competition

- Dates: 21 February - 17 March 2026
- Teams: 6
- Sponsor: Masita
- Champions: St Kieran's College (26th title); David Barcoe (captain); Brian Dowling (manager)
- Runners-up: Presentation College Athenry; Ronan Murphy (captain); Ronan McGlynn (captain); Michael Finn (manager)

Tournament statistics
- Matches played: 5
- Goals scored: 15 (3 per match)
- Points scored: 160 (32 per match)
- Top scorer(s): Conor McEvoy (0-18)

The 2026 All-Ireland Post Primary Schools Croke Cup was the 73rd staging of the Croke Cup since its establishment by the Gaelic Athletic Association in 1944. The competition ran from 21 February to 17 March 2026.

Thurles CBS were the defending champions, however, they failed to qualify after being beaten by St Joseph's CBS Nenagh in the semi-final of the Dr Harty Cup.

The final was played on 17 March 2026 at Croke Park in Dublin, between St Kieran's College and Presentation College Athenry, in what was their fourth meeting in the final overall. St Kieran's College won the match by 3–19 to 2–16 to claim their 26th Croke Cup title overall and a first title in tw0 years.

Conor McEvoy was the top scorer with 0–18.

== Qualification ==
| Province | Champions | Runners-up |
|---|---|---|
| Connacht | Presentation College | St Raphael's College |
| Leinster | St Kieran's College | Kilkenny CBS |
| Munster | St Joseph's CBS Nenagh | St Flannan's College |

== Results ==
=== Quarter-finals ===
| 21 February 2026 Quarter-final | St Flannan's College | 2-12 - 0-13 | Kilkenny CBS | Canon Hayes Park |
| | J Barry 0-6 (5f, 1’65); T O’Connor 1-1; H Doherty 0-3 (2f); G Ball (1-0); D McNamara, E O’Connor (0-1 each) | Report | P Lacey 0-8 (6f); A Clifford, Z Scanlon, O O’Donovan, C Byrne, Joe Dowling 0-1 each |

| 21 February 2026 Quarter-final | St Kieran's College | 2-19 - 0-16 | St Raphael's College | St Michael's Park |
| | F Mahony 1-5; C McEvoy 0-5 (all frees); G O’Shea 1-1; J Mullen 0-4; D Behan 0-3; E Cahill 0-1. | Report | J Shaughnessy 0-5 (all frees); E Mulleady 0-3; S Keane 0-3 (1f); E Coleman 0-3; K Connaire 0-1; T Mac Cárthaigh 0-1. |

=== Semi-finals ===
| 7 March 2026 Semi-final | Presentation College | 1-18 - 1-14 | St Flannan's College | Kilbeacanty Grounds |
| | C Leen 0-10 (7f, 1’65, 1sl); C Hannon 1-1; R Cahalan 0-3; N McCarthy 0-2; A McDonagh, S Brady 0-1 each | Report | J Barry 0-7 (5f); H Doherty (1-3); G Ball, P Finneran, T O’Connor, J Cullinan 0-1 each |

| 7 March 2026 Semi-final | St Joseph's CBS Nenagh | 2-15 - 2-18 | St Kieran's College | Kelly O'Daly Park |
| | E Doughan (0-8, 5 frees); E Tucker (1-2); J O’Dwyer (1-1); P Ryan ((0-2); P McCormack (free), C Healy (0-1 each) | Report | C McEvoy (0-9, 7 frees, 1 ’65); J Mullen (1-1); D Carroll (1-0); D Barcoe, G O’Shea (0-2 each); B Nevin, L Lawlor, D Behan, N Spellman (0-1 each). |

=== Final ===
| 17 March 2026 Final | Presentation College | 2-16 - 3-19 | St Kieran's College | Croke Park |
| | C Leen (0-7, 3 frees, 1 65); R Cahalan (0-5); C Hannon, M Cloonan (1-0 each); A Poniard (0-3); I Leen (0-1). | Report | F Mahony (1-4); G O'Shea (1-3); D Carroll (1-1); C McEvoy (0-4, 1 65, 1 free); J Mullen (0-3, 1 free); B Nevin, C Holohan, B Hickey, D Barcoe (0-1 each). | Referee: T Walsh (Waterford) |

== Statistics ==
=== Top scorers ===
| Rank | Player | County | Tally | Total | Matches | Average |
|---|---|---|---|---|---|---|
| 1 | Conor McEvoy | St Kieran's College | 0-18 | 18 | 3 | 6.00 |
| 2 | Ciarán Leen | Presentation College | 0-17 | 17 | 2 | 8.50 |
| 3 | Fionn Mahony | St Kieran's College | 2-09 | 15 | 3 | 5.00 |
| 4 | John Barry | St Flannan's College | 0-13 | 13 | 2 | 6.50 |
| 5 | Gearóid O'Shea | St Kieran's College | 2-06 | 12 | 3 | 4.00 |
| 6 | Jake Mullen | St Kieran's College | 1-08 | 11 | 3 | 3.66 |
| 7 | Harry Doherty | St Flannan's College | 1-06 | 9 | 2 | 4.50 |
| 8 | Ronan Cahalan | Presentation College | 0-08 | 8 | 2 | 4.00 |
| 8 | Eoghan Doughan | St Joseph's CBS | 0-08 | 8 | 1 | 8.00 |
| 8 | Patrick Lacey | Kilkenny CBS | 0-08 | 8 | 1 | 8.00 |
