= James Ryall =

Kilkenny hurler

Personal information
- Native name: Séamas Ó Raghaill (Irish)
- Nickname: Ryallers
- Born: 14 November 1980 (age 45) Ballycallan, County Kilkenny, Ireland
- Occupation: Sales representative
- Height: 6 ft 3 in (191 cm)

Sport
- Sport: Hurling
- Position: Right wing-back
Club
- Years: Club
- Graigue–Ballycallan
Club titles
- Kilkenny titles: 1
- Leinster titles: 1
- All-Ireland Titles: 0
Inter-county
| Years | County | Apps (scores) |
| 2003–2010 | Kilkenny | 20 (0–00) |
Inter-county titles
- Leinster titles: 7
- All-Irelands: 6
- NHL: 2
- All Stars: 0

James Ryall (born 14 November 1980) is an Irish hurler who plays for his local club Graigue–Ballycallan and at senior level for the Kilkenny county team from 2002 to 2010.

== Biography ==
James Ryall was born in Kilmanagh, County Kilkenny in 1980. He was educated locally and later attended Coláiste Éamann Rís in Kilkenny, a well known hurling school. Here his hurling talents were quickly spotted and he won a Leinster Colleges' title with the school's senior hurling team. Ryall later attended the Galway-Mayo Institute of Technology, where he was named Hurler of the Year in 2001. He currently works as a sales rep with Michael Lyng Motors Kilkenny.

== Playing career ==
=== Club ===
Ryall plays for his local Graigue–Ballycallan club. He had some success at underage level and was on the panel when his club won the county championship in 1998 and 2000.

=== Inter-county ===
Although never having All-Ireland success at minor or under-21 level with Kilkenny, Ryall became a key member of the team after joining the panel in 2002. Within a year of joining the team he had won his first Leinster SHC and All-Ireland SHC titles, following wins over Wexford and Cork respectively. In 2004 Kilkenny were aiming to win a third All-Ireland SHC title in-a-row; however, Kilkenny ended that year without any major title. The team was back in 2005 with Ryall collecting his first National Hurling League medal, as well as a second Leinster SHC title. Galway later defeated Kilkenny in an All-Ireland SHC semi-final. In 2006 Ryall won his third Leinster SHC medal, before later collecting his second All-Ireland medal following a win over Cork.

On 8 September 2010, speculation went around that Ryall was retiring from inter-county hurling defeat by Tipperary; however, it turned out originally that the report was misquoted. In December, 2010 Ryall confirmed his retirement from inter-county hurling.

== Honours ==
Kilkenny

- All-Ireland Senior Hurling Championship:
  - Winner (6): 2002, 2003, 2006, 2007, 2008, 2009
- Leinster Senior Hurling Championship:
  - Winner (8): 2002, 2003, 2005, 2006, 2007, 2008, 2009, 2010
- National Hurling League:
  - Winner (5): 2002, 2003, 2005, 2006, 2009
- Walsh Cup:
  - Winner (4): 2005, 2006, 2007, 2009
