= 2001 Kilkenny Senior Hurling Championship =

Annual hurling competition season

- Dates: 27 July 2001 – 14 October 2001
- Teams: 12
- Sponsor: St. Canice's Credit Union
- Champions: O'Loughlin Gaels (1st title); Andy Comerford (captain)
- Runners-up: Graigue-Ballycallan
- Relegated: John Locke's

Tournament statistics
- Matches played: 14
- Goals scored: 37 (2.64 per match)
- Points scored: 315 (22.5 per match)
- Top scorer(s): Nigel Skehan (1-31)

The 2001 Kilkenny Senior Hurling Championship was the 107th staging of the Kilkenny Senior Hurling Championship since its establishment by the Kilkenny County Board in 1887.

Graigue-Ballycallan were the defending champions.

On 14 October 2001, O'Loughlin Gaels won the title after a 1–17 to 1–06 defeat of Graigue-Ballycallan in the final at Nowlan Park. It was their first ever championship title.

== Team changes ==
=== To Championship ===
Promoted from the Kilkenny Intermediate Hurling Championship

- Dunnamaggin

=== From Championship ===
Relegated to the Kilkenny Intermediate Hurling Championship

- Clara

== Results ==
=== First round ===
27 July 2001 First round	Graigue-Ballycallan	3-07 - 1-12	Young Irelands	Nowlan Park, Kilkenny
	A Ronan 1-3, M Hoyne 1-0, E Brennan 1-0, J Young 0-2, G Cleere 0-1, D Cleere 0-1.		DJ Carey 1-1, P O'Neill 0-4, C Carter 0-3, S Byrne 0-2, E Farrell 0-1, J Carey 0-1.

28 July 2001 First round	Dicksboro	1-16 - 1-09	John Locke's	Thomastown
	D O'Neill 0-9, J O'Gorman 1-1, D Beirne 0-2, S Morrissey 0-2, D O'Gorman 0-1, C O'Loughlin 0-1.		R Jackman 0-4, A Power 1-0, J Power 0-2, J O'Neill 0-2, J Gormley 0-1.

28 July 2001 First round	Dunnamaggin	2-09 - 1-08	James Stephens	Thomastown
	R Cahill 0-6, K O'Shea 1-1, K Moore 1-0, M O'Neill 0-1, N McCormack 0-1.		B McEvoy 0-6, T O'Dowd 1-0, P Barry 0-1, E McCormack 0-1.

29 July 2001 First round	Ballyhale Shamrocks	0-15 - 0-11	Fenians	Nowlan Park, Kilkenny
	H Shefflin 0-12, B Aylward 0-1, P Reid 0-1, D Hoyne 0-1.		E Behan 0-4, L Ryan 0-3, J Garrett 0-1, S Grehan 0-1, P Quinlan 0-1, J Delaney 0-1.

=== Relegation play-offs ===
8 September 2001 Final	Fenians	2-09 - 1-07	John Locke's	Nowlan Park, Kilkenny
	L Ryan 1-1, K Power 0-4, P Quinlan 1-0, B Ryan 0-2, B Power 0-1, J Garrett 0-1.		J O'Neill 0-5, PJ Cody 1-0, A Power 0-1, R Jackman 0-1.

=== Quarter-finals ===
31 August 2001 Quarter-final	Glenmore	0-12 - 1-09	Dicksboro	Nowlan Park, Kilkenny

1 September 2001 Quarter-final	O'Loughlin Gaels	0-18 - 2-12	Dunnamaggin	John Locke Park, Callan
	N Skehan 0-10, B Dowling 0-2, S Dowling 0-2, A Geoghegan 0-1, C Furlong 0-1, M Comerford 0-1, J Comerford 0-1.		C Herity 0-8, N McCormack 1-0, N Lahart 1-0, E Kennedy 0-1, M O'Neill 0-1, K O'Shea 0-1, R Cahill 0-1.

2 September 2001 Quarter-final	Erin's Own	2-18 - 3-11	Ballyhale Shamrocks	Nowlan Park, Kilkenny
	D Buggy 1-8, M Coogan 1-2, D Byrne 0-3, G Byrne 0-2, B Young 0-2, M Owens 0-1.		E Reid 1-1, T Shefflin 1-1, H Shefflin 0-4, P Shefflin 1-0, P Reid 0-3, B Aylward 0-1, L Farrell 0-1.

2 September 2001 Quarter-final	Graigue-Ballycallan	1-12 - 1-08	Tullaroan	Nowlan Park, Kilkenny
	J Hoyne 1-3, A Ronan 0-3, D Cleere 0-3, E Brennan 0-1, D Byrne 0-1, T Dermody 0-1.		L Keoghan 1-2, J Coogan 0-5, B Teehan 0-1.

8 September 2001 Quarter-final replay	Glenmore	1-16 - 4-06	Dicksboro	Thomastown
	R Heffernan 0-12, P Fitzgerald 1-1, PJ O'Connor 0-2, S Vereker 0-1.		B Dalton 2-1, D Beirne 1-0, A Barry 1-0, D O'Neill 0-3, D O'Gorman 0-1, S Morrissey 0-1.

8 September 2001 Quarter-final replay	O'Loughlin Gaels	2-16 - 1-10	Dunnamaggin	John Locke Park, Callan
	M Comerford 1-3, N Skehan 0-6, B Kelly 1-1, A Geoghegan 0-2, A Comerford 0-1, C Furlong 0-1, B Dowling 0-1, S Dowling 0-1.		R Cahill 0-5, S Ryan 1-1, K Moore 0-2, B O'Shea 0-2.

=== Semi-finals ===
30 September 2001 Semi-final	O'Loughlin Gaels	0-12 - 0-11	Glenmore	Nowlan Park, Kilkenny
	N Skehan 0-6, A Geoghegan 0-2, S Dowling 0-2, J Comerford 0-1, B Kelly 0-1.		P Mullally 0-5, S Dollard 0-2, R Heffernan 0-2, P Fitzgerald 0-1, R Mullally 0-1.	Referee: D O'Sullivan (John Locke's)

30 September 2001 Semi-final	Graigue-Ballycallan	3-10 - 2-08	Erin's Own	Nowlan Park, Kilkenny
	A Ronan 0-6, M Hoyne 1-1, E Brennan 1-0, J Ryall 1-0, D Cleere 0-1, J Hoyne 0-1, D Byrne 0-1.		D Buggy 1-6, E Rothwell 1-0, M Coogan 0-1, B Young 0-1.	Referee: P Dunphy (Carrigeen)

=== Final ===
14 October 2001 Final	O'Loughlin Gaels	1-17 - 1-06	Graigue-Ballycallan	Nowlan Park, Kilkenny
	N Skehan 1-9 (0-7 fs), J Comerford 0-2, A Geoghegan 0-2 (1f), A Comerford, B Kelly, M Comerford and B Dowling 0-1 each.		A Ronan 1-5 (all fs), D Cleere 0-1 (f).	Referee: J Guinan (Lisdowney)

== Championship statistics ==
=== Top scorers ===
Top scorers overall

Rank	Player	Club	Tally	Total	Matches	Average
1	Nigel Skehan	O'Loughlin Gaels	1-31	34	4	8.50
2	Adrian Ronan	Graigue-Ballycallan	2-17	23	4	5.75
3	David Buggy	Erin's Own	2-14	20	2	10.00
4	Henry Shefflin	Ballyhale Shamrocks	0-16	16	2	8.00
5	Ray Heffernan	Glenmore	0-14	14	2	7.00

Top scorers in a single game

Rank	Player	Club	Tally	Total	Opposition
1	Nigel Skehan	O'Loughlin Gaels	1-09	12	Graigue-Ballycallan
1	Henry Shefflin	Ballyhale Shamrocks	0-12	12	Fenians
1	Ray Heffernan	Glenmore	0-12	12	Dicksboro
2	David Buggy	Erin's Own	1-08	11	Ballyhale Shamrocks
3	Nigel Skehan	O'Loughlin Gaels	0-10	10	Dunnamaggin
4	David Buggy	Erin's Own	1-06	9	Graigue-Ballycallan
4	Dan O'Neill	Dicksboro	0-09	9	John Locke's
5	Adrian Ronan	Graigue-Ballycallan	1-05	8	O'Loughlin Gaels
5	Colin Herity	Dunnamaggin	0-08	8	O'Loughlin Gaels
6	Brendan Dalton	Dicksboro	2-01	7	Glenmore
