= 2002 All-Ireland Senior Hurling Championship final =

2002 All-Ireland Hurling Final
- Event: 2002 All-Ireland Senior Hurling Championship
Kilkenny	Clare
2–20	0–19
- Date: 8 September 2002
- Venue: Croke Park, Dublin
- Man of the Match: Henry Shefflin (Kilkenny)
- Referee: Aodán Mac Suibhne (Dublin)
- Attendance: 76,254
- Weather: Rain

The 2002 All-Ireland Senior Hurling Championship Final was the 115th All-Ireland Hurling Final and the culmination of the 2002 All-Ireland Senior Hurling Championship, a tournament for the top hurling counties. The match was held at Croke Park, Dublin, on 8 September 2002, between Kilkenny and Clare. Kilkenny won on a score line of 2–20 to 0–19. The winning captain for Kilkenny was Andy Comerford.

== Match details ==
=== Summary ===
D. J. Carey got the opening score, a goal in the third-minute goal, touching into the net after a Henry Shefflin run and lob into the square. Kilkenny were 1–2 to 0–0 up after six minutes of play.

8 September 2002
15:30 UCT+1

Kilkenny	2–20 – 0–19	Clare
H. Shefflin (1–7); D. J. Carey (1–6); M. Comerford (0–1); E. Brennan (0–1); A. Comerford (0–1); J. Coogan (0–1); D. Lyng (0–1); B. McEvoy (0–1); C. Carter (0–1)	(report)	S. McMahon (0–6); J. O'Connor (0–4); C. Lynch (0–2); N. Gilligan (0–2); G. Considine (0–2 each); T. Griffin (0–1); O. Baker (0–1); A. Quinn (0–1)

Croke Park, Dublin
Attendance: 76,254
Referee: Aodán Mac Suibhne (Dublin)

MATCH RULES

- 70 minutes.
- Replay if scores level.
- Five substitutes allowed
