= 2025 Croke Cup =

Irish hurling competition

- Dates: 15 February - 17 March 2025
- Teams: 6
- Sponsor: Masita
- Champions: Thurles CBS (2nd title); Robbie Ryan (captain); Niall Cahill (manager)
- Runners-up: Presentation College Athenry; Jason Rabbitte (captain); Paul Hoban (manager)

Tournament statistics
- Matches played: 5
- Goals scored: 11 (2.2 per match)
- Points scored: 177 (35.4 per match)
- Top scorer(s): Ciarán Leen (2-26)

The 2025 All-Ireland Post Primary Schools Croke Cup was the 72nd staging of the Croke Cup since its establishment by the Gaelic Athletic Association in 1944. The competition ran from 15 February to 17 March 2025.

St Kieran's College were the defending champions, however, they were beaten by Presentation College Athenry in the semi-finals.

The final was played on 17 March 2025 at Croke Park in Dublin, between Thurles CBS and Presentation College Athenry, in what was their first ever meeting in the final. Thurles CBS won the match by 0–24 to 2–17 to claim their second Croke Cup title overall and a first title in 16 years.

Ciarán Leen was the top scorer with 2-26.

== Qualification ==
Province	Champions	Runners-up
Connacht	Presentation College	Coláiste Bhaile Chláir
Leinster	St Kieran's College	Kilkenny CBS
Munster	Thurles CBS	St Flannan's College

== Results ==
=== Quarter-finals ===
15 February 2025 Quarter-final	St Flannan's College	1-14 - 1-19	Presentation College Athenry	Gort Grounds
	H Doherty (0-8 all frees); D McNamara (1-1), R Kilroy (0-2), R Loftus (0-2); J Cullinan (0-1).	Report	C Leen (1-11, 0-9 frees), J Rabbitte (0-5, 0-1 free), F Burke (0-2), E O'Brien (0-1).

21 February 2025 Quarter-final	Kilkenny CBS	0-20 - 1-21	Coláiste Bhaile Chláir	St Rynagh's Park
	P Lacey (0-14, 9fs and 1 '65); O O'Donovan (0-3); N Drennan (0-2); D Hennessy (0-1)	Report	E Collins (0-10, 9fs); M Collins (0-5); R Duggan (1-1); C Feeney (0-3); J Kelly (0-1), G King (0-1, 1f).

=== Semi-final ===
1 March 2025 Semi-final	Thurles CBS	0-21 - 0-17	Coláiste Bhaile Chláir	St Rynagh's Park
	C Fitzpatrick (0-7, 0-3f, 0-1 65), R Ryan, J Hayes all 0-3 each, R Bargary, T Ryan 0-2 each, E Murray, C Minogue, K Rossiter, T Corbett all 0-1 each.	Report	E Collins (0-7, 0-5f), C Feeney, J Kelly 0-2 each, S Moran 0-2f, R Duggan, G King, B Morley, D Casserly all 0-1 each.

1 March 2025 Semi-final	St Kieran's College	2-11 - 4-13	Presentation College Athenry	Canon Hayes Park
	R Sweeney 1-1, N Manogue 0-4, E Lauhoff 0-2, R Murphy 0-2, D Barcoe 0-1, M Rohan 0-1.	Report	C Leen 1-6, E Hannon 1-1, O Fitzpatrick 1-1, E O'Brien 1-0, J Rabbitte 0-2, F Burke 0-1, R Murphy 0-1, A Niland 0-1.

=== Final ===
17 March 2025 Final	Thurles CBS	0-24 - 2-17	Presentation College Athenry	Croke Park
	C Fitzpatrick 0-10 (8fs), K Rossiter 0-4, C Minogue 0-3, E Murray 0-2, K Loughnane 0-1, J Hayes 0-1, J Butler 0-1, D Costigan 0-1, R Ryan 0-1.	Report	C Leen 0-9 (6fs), A Niland 1-2 (1-0f), F Burke 1-1, E Hannon 0-2, C Hannon 0-2, J Rabbitte 0-1.	Referee: J Murphy (Limerick)

== Statistics ==
=== Top scorers ===
Rank	Player	County	Tally	Total	Matches	Average
1	Ciarán Leen	Presentation College	2-26	32	3	10.66
2	Eoin Collins	Coláiste Bhaile Chláir	0-17	17	2	8.50
2	Cormac Fitzpatrick	Thurles CBS	0-17	17	2	8.50
4	Patrick Lacey	Kilkenny CBS	0-14	14	1	14.00
5	Jason Rabbitte	Presentation College	0-08	8	3	2.66
