= John Hoyne =

Irish hurler

Personal information
- Native name: Seán Ó hEoghain (Irish)
- Born: 2 April 1978 (age 48) Ballycallan, County Kilkenny
- Occupation: Carpenter
- Height: 6 ft 1 in (185 cm)

Sport
- Sport: Hurling
- Position: Half-forward
Club
- Years: Club
- Graigue–Ballycallan
Inter-county
- Years: County
- 1998-2005: Kilkenny
Inter-county titles
- Leinster titles: 5
- All-Irelands: 3

John Joseph Hoyne (born 2 April 1978) is a former Irish sportsperson. He plays hurling with his local club Graigue–Ballycallan and he used play with the Kilkenny senior inter-county team from 2000 until 2005.

== Playing career ==
=== Club ===
Hoyne plays his club hurling with his local Graigue–Ballycallan club and has enjoyed much success. He won both county minor and under-21 honours with the club before playing in four successive senior county finals from 1998 until 2001. Hoyne ended up on the winning side in 1998 and 2000.

=== Inter-county ===
Hoyne first came to prominence on the inter-county scene at underage levels. He won Leinster medals in both minor and under-21 with Kilkenny before later joining the county senior team.

Hoyne won his first senior Leinster title with his native-county in 2000. He later lined out in his first All-Ireland final at Croke Park where Offaly, the defeated Leinster finalists, provided the opposition. The stakes were high for Kilkenny as the prospect of becoming the first team to lose three All-Ireland finals in-a-row was a daunting one. In the end victory went to Kilkenny by a huge score and Hoyne collected his first All-Ireland medal. He won a second Leinster title in 2001, however, his side were later beaten in the All-Ireland semi-final. 2002 saw Hoyne add a National Hurling League medal to his collection before winning a third provincial title. Kilkenny subsequently defeated Clare in the championship decider, giving Hoyne a second All-Ireland medal. The success continued in 2003 as he won a second consecutive National League medal. Hoyne later won a fourth Leinster title before lining out in another All-Ireland final. Cork were the opponents on that occasion, however, 'the Cats' overcame the Leesiders in a thrilling game, giving Hoyne a third All-Ireland medal. In 2004 Kilkenny were aiming for a third All-Ireland title in-a-row, however, all did not go to plan as the team lost their provincial crown to Wexford. Kilkenny did reach the All-Ireland final via the 'back-door' system, however, Cork defeated them in a tense match. Hoyne won a fifth Leinster medal in 2005, however, Kilkenny were later caught on the hop in the All-Ireland semi-final as Galway defeated 'the Cats' in one of the all-time classic games. Hoyne retired from inter-county duty shortly afterwards.
