= 2010 Kilkenny Senior Hurling Championship =

Annual hurling competition season

- Dates: 18 September 2010 – 24 October 2010
- Teams: 12
- Sponsor: St. Canice's Credit Union
- Champions: O'Loughlin Gaels (9th title); Martin Comerford (captain); Mick Nolan (manager)
- Runners-up: Carrickshock; Richie Power (captain); Brendan Fennelly (manager)
- Relegated: St. Lachtain's

Tournament statistics
- Matches played: 12
- Goals scored: 23 (1.92 per match)
- Points scored: 324 (27 per match)
- Top scorer(s): Richie Power (0-40)

The 2010 Kilkenny Senior Hurling Championship was the 116th staging of the Kilkenny Senior Hurling Championship since its establishment by the Kilkenny County Board in 1887. The championship began on 18 September 2010 and ended on 24 October 2010.

Ballyhale Shamrocks were the defending champions for the past four years, however their bid for five in a row was ended in the semi-final by O’Loughlin Gaels, who went on to beat Carrickshock 0–17 to 1–11 in the final.

St. Lachtain's were relegated from the championship following 1–11 to 1–14 defeat to Fenians.

== Team changes ==
=== To Championship ===
Promoted from the Kilkenny Intermediate Hurling Championship

- St. Lachtain's

=== From Championship ===
Relegated to the Kilkenny Intermediate Hurling Championship

- Young Irelands

== Results ==
=== First round ===
18 September 2010 First round	Tullaroan	0-10 - 1-11	Dunnamaggin	Tom Ryall Park, Kilmanagh
15:00	T Walsh 0-4, Mark Walsh 0-4, Michael Walsh 0-3.		K Moore 1-2, S O'Neill 0-3, C Hickey 0-2, D Fitzpatrick 0-2, JJ Dunphy 0-1, P Kennelly 0-1.	Referee: P Dunphy (Carrigeen)

18 September 2010 First round	St. Lachtain's	1-13 - 1-19	St. Martin's	St. Patrick's Park, Ballyragget
15:00	E Guinan 0-8, J Meagher 1-3, R Dowling 0-1, N McGree 0-1.		J Maher 1-10, J Mulhall 0-6, E McGrath 0-1, R Shore 0-1, S Coonan 0-1.	Referee: D Connolly (Mooncoin)

19 September 2010 First round	Carrickshock	2-16 - 2-15	Graigue-Ballycallan	John Locke Park, Callan
13:00	R Power 0-9, A Power 1-1, John Power 1-1, Jamie Power 0-3, M Rice 0-2.		N Millea 0-8, J Smith 2-0, E Brennan 0-2, J Murphy 0-1, P Kennedy 0-1, J Hoyne 0-1, G Cleere 0-1, D Heafey 0-1.	Referee: J Direen (O'Loughlin Gaels)

19 September 2010 First round	Fenians	0-10 - 0-13	Clara	Canon Kearns Park, Castlecomer
13:00	K Reid 0-4, C Tobin 0-3, K Grehan 0-1, J Broderick 0-1, PJ Ryan 0-1.		J Nolan 0-4, L Ryan 0-3, K Hogan 0-2, D Langton 0-1, B Phelan 0-1, C Phelan 0-1, E O'Shea 0-1.	Referee: E Mansfield (Cloneen)

=== Relegation play-off ===
16 October 2010 Play-off	St. Lachtain's	1-11- 1-14	Fenians	Nowlan Park, Kilkenny
	R Dowling 1-1, N McGree 0-3, E Guinan 0-3, J Fitzpatrick 0-1, J Meagher 0-1, P Guinan 0-1, B Kennedy 0-1.		L Ryan 1-2, K Power 0-3, PJ Ryan 0-2, K Grehan 0-2, E Shiel 0-2, P Quinlan 0-1, D Tobin 0-1.	Referee: P Neary (James Stephens)

=== Quarter-finals ===
25 September 2010 Quarter-final	Erin's Own	0-13 - 0-08	Clara	St. Patrick's Park, Ballyragget
14:30	M Murphy 0-8, D Fogarty 0-3, G Callinan 0-1, C Fogarty 0-1.		J Nolan 0-5, L Ryan 0-1, K Hogan 0-1, L Ryan 0-1.	Referee: J Guinan (St. Lachtain's)

25 September 2010 Quarter-final	Ballyhale Shamrocks	1-19 - 0-09	Dunnamaggin	Hugginstown Sporstfield, Carrickshock
16:30	TJ Reid 0-9, M Aylward 1-1, C Fennelly 0-2, J Walsh 0-2, P Reid 0-1, M Fennelly 0-1, D Hoyne 0-1, J Fitzpatrick 0-1, B Costello 0-1.		S O'Neill 0-5, K Moore 0-4.	Referee: D Connolly (Mooncoin)

26 September 2010 Quarter-final	O'Loughlin Gaels	2-12 - 1-12	St. Martin's	Canon Kearns Park, Castlecomer
13:00	M Comerford 2-2, M Bergin 0-6, M Nolan 0-2, A Geoghegan 0-1, P Dowling 0-1.		J Maher 0-9, R Shore 1-0, J Mulhall 0-3.	Referee: M Flynn (Mooncoin)

26 September 2010 Quarter-final	James Stephens	1-15 - 1-20	Carrickshock	John Locke Park, Callan
16:00	D Walton 0-9, E Larkin 1-2, M Ruth 0-2, E McCormack 0-1, D Cody 0-1.		R Power 0-13, Jamie Power 0-4, John Power 1-0, M Rice 0-2, A Power 0-1.	Referee: G Quilty (Slieverue)

=== Semi-finals ===
10 October 2010 Semi-final	Erin's Own	1-14 - 1-16	Carrickshock	Nowlan Park, Kilkenny
14:00	M Boran 1-4, M Murphy 0-3, D Fogarty 0-2, R Ryan 0-2, G Byrne 0-2, P Boran 0-1.		R Power 0-12, John Power 1-0, D Franks 0-1, P Tennyson 0-1, M Rice 0-1, Jamie Power 0-1.	Referee: S Cleere (O'Loughlin Gaels)

10 October 2010 Semi-final	Ballyhale Shamrocks	3-10 - 2-16	O'Loughlin Gaels	Nowlan Park, Kilkenny
15:30	E Reid 2-1, TJ Reid 0-5, M Fennelly 1-0, D Hoyne 0-2, J Fitzpatrick 0-1, J Walsh 0-1.		D Loughnane 1-3, M Bergin 0-6, N McEvoy 1-1, M Nolan 0-4, A Geoghegan 0-2.	Referee: P Dunphy (Carrigeen)

=== Final ===
24 October 2010 Final	Carrickshock	1-11 - 0-17	O'Loughlin Gaels	Nowlan Park, Kilkenny
15:30	R Power 0-6 (0-4f, 0-1 '65'), J Tennyson 1-1, N Rohan, M Rice 0-2 each.	Report	M Bergin 0-7 (0-5f), A Geoghegan 0-3, M Comerford, B Dowling, N McEvoy 0-2 each, S Cummins 0-1.	Referee: E Mansfield

== Championship statistics ==
=== Top scorers ===
Top scorers overall

Rank	Player	Club	Tally	Total	Matches	Average
1	Richie Power	Carrickshock	0-40	40	4	10.00
2	John Maher	St. Martin's	1-19	22	2	11.00
3	Mark Bergin	O'Loughlin Gaels	0-19	19	3	6.33
4	T. J. Reid	Ballyhale Shamrocks	0-14	14	2	7.00
5	Eoin Guinan	St. Lachtain's	0-11	11	2	5.50
5	Michael Murphy	Erin's Own	0-11	11	2	5.50
6	John Power	Carrickshock	3-01	10	4	2.25
6	Martin Comerford	Ballyhale Shamrocks	2-04	10	2	5.00
7	Ken Moore	Dunnamaggin	1-06	9	2	4.50
7	David Walton	James Stephens	0-09	9	1	9.00
7	John Mulhall	St. Martin's	0-09	9	2	4.50
7	James Nolan	Clara	0-09	9	2	4.50

Top scorers in a single game

Rank	Player	Club	Tally	Total	Opposition
1	John Maher	St. Martin's	1-10	13	St. Lachtain's
1	Richie Power	Carrickshock	0-13	13	James Stephens
2	Richie Power	Carrickshock	0-12	12	Erin's Own
3	Richie Power	Carrickshock	0-09	9	Graigue-Ballycallan
3	T. J. Reid	Ballyhale Shamrocks	0-09	9	Dunnamaggin
3	John Maher	St. Martin's	0-09	9	O'Loughlin Gaels
3	David Walton	James Stephens	0-09	9	Carrickshock
4	Martin Comerford	O'Loughlin Gaels	2-02	8	St. Martin's
4	Eoin Guinan	St. Lachtain's	0-08	8	St. Martin's
4	Niall Millea	Graigue-Ballycallan	0-08	8	Carrickshock
4	Michael Murphy	Erin's Own	0-08	8	Clara
