= Graigue–Ballycallan GAA =

Gaelic sports club in County Kilkenny, Ireland

Graigue–Ballycallan
- Gráig–Baile Uí Challáin
- Founded: 1969
- County: Kilkenny
- Colours: Sky blue and white
- Grounds: Tom Ryall Park
- Coordinates: 52°37′17.32″N 7°22′05.31″W

Playing kits
Standard colours

Senior Club Championships
	All Ireland	Leinster champions	Kilkenny champions
Hurling:	0	1	2

Graigue–Ballycallan GAA is a Gaelic Athletic Association club located in Kilmanagh, County Kilkenny, Ireland. The club fields teams in both hurling and Gaelic football.

== History ==
Located in the village of Kilmanagh, on the Kilkenny-Tipperary border, the club was founded in 1969 as a result of an amalgamation between the two existing clubs in the parish. The club spent the first 15 years of its existence operating in the junior grade. Three Northern JHC titles were won during this period before the Kilkenny JHC title was claimed in 1985. Two years later in 1987 the club achieved senior status when Graigue-Ballycallan beat O'Loughlin Gaels to win the Kilkenny IHC.

Graigue-Ballycallan spent the next 25 years in the top flight. During that time the club claimed two Kilkenny SHC titles from four consecutive finals appearances between 1998 and 2001. Graigue-Ballycallan were denied the ultimate club hurling honour when they were beaten by Athenry in the 2001 All-Ireland club final. After being relegated in 2013, the club reclaimed their senior status by winning a second Kilkenny IHC title in 2018.

== Honours ==
- Leinster Senior Club Hurling Championship (1): 2000
- Kilkenny Senior Hurling Championship (2): 1998, 2000
- Leinster Intermediate Club Hurling Championship (1): 2018
- Kilkenny Intermediate Hurling Championship (2): 1987, 2018
- Kilkenny Junior Hurling Championship (1): 1985
- Northern Junior Hurling Championship (3): 1970, 1979, 1985
- Kilkenny Under-21 A Hurling Championships (1): 1997
- Kilkenny Minor Hurling Championships (2): 1994, 1996

== Notable hurlers ==
- Eddie Brennan: All-Ireland SHC-winner (2000, 2002, 2003, 2006, 2007, 2008, 2009, 2011)
- Denis Byrne: All-Ireland SHC-winner (2000)
- John Hoyne: All-Ireland SHC-winner (2000, 2002, 2003)
- Joe Millea: All-Ireland SHC-winner (1969)
- Adrian Ronan: All-Ireland SHC-winner (1992, 1993)
- James Ryall: All-Ireland SHC-winner (2002, 2003, 2006, 2007, 2008, 2009)
