= O'Loughlin Gaels GAA =

GAA club in Kilkenny, Ireland

O'Loughlin Gaels
- Gaeil Uí Lochlainn
- Founded: 1969
- County: Kilkenny
- Nickname: The Loughs
- Colours
- Grounds: St John's Park
- Coordinates: 52°39′30.85″N 7°14′08.48″W

Playing kits
Standard colours

Senior Club Championships
	All Ireland	Leinster champions	Kilkenny champions
Hurling:	0	3	5

O'Loughlin Gaels is a Gaelic Athletic Association club in Kilkenny, Ireland. The club is primarily concerned with the game of hurling, but also fields teams in Gaelic football.

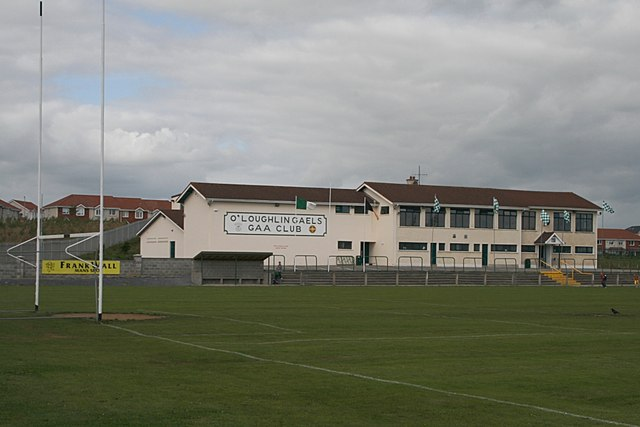
St John's Park

== History ==
Located in the St John's parish area of Kilkenny, O'Loughlin's GAA Club was founded in 1969 as a replacement for the St Johns Hurling Club that had been in existence since 1887. The 'Gaels' part was later added after a merger with the Clann na Gael club. The new club had an early success in 1975 when they beat Carrickshock to win the Kilkenny JHC title. This was followed by a Kilkenny IHC title in 1987.

After eventually returning to the junior ranks, O'Loughlin Gaels secured senior status once again after a Kilkenny JHC success in 1995 and a Kilkenny IHC success in 1996. The early years of the new century saw the club win Kilkenny SHC titles in 2001 and 2003, before also claiming the Leinster Club SHC title in the latter year.

O'Loughin Gaels won their third Kilkenny SHC and second Leinster Club SHC titles in 2010, however, the club was later beaten by Clarinbridge in the 2011 All-Ireland Club SHC final. Further Kilkenny SHC titles were won in 2016 and 2023. The latter win was subsequently converted into a third Leinster Club SHC title, however, O'Loughlin Gaels were beaten by a point by St Thomas' in the 2024 All-Ireland Club SHC final.

== Honours ==
- Leinster Senior Club Hurling Championship (3): 2003, 2010, 2023
- Kilkenny Senior Hurling Championship (5): 2001, 2003, 2010, 2016, 2023
- Kilkenny Intermediate Hurling Championship (2): 1978, 1996
- Kilkenny Junior Hurling Championship (2): 1975, 1995
- Kilkenny Minor Hurling Championship (6): 1972, 1978, 1980, 2004, 2014, 2017
- Kilkenny Under-21 Hurling Championship (4): 1976, 1981, 2015, 2019

== Notable hurlers ==
- Andy Comerford: All-Ireland SHC-winner (2000, 2002, 2003)
- Martin Comerford: All-Ireland SHC-winner (2002, 2003, 2006, 2007, 2008, 2009)
- Brian Dowling: All-Ireland SHC-winner (2002, 2003)
- Seán Dowling: All-Ireland SHC-winner (2002, 2003)
- Brian Hogan: All-Ireland SHC-winner (2006, 2007, 2008, 2009, 2011, 2012, 2014)
