= 2011 All-Ireland Senior Club Hurling Championship final =

2011 All-Ireland Senior Club Hurling Championship Final
- Event: 2010–11 All-Ireland Senior Club Hurling Championship
Clarinbridge	O'Loughlin Gaels
2-18	0-12
- Date: 17 March 2011
- Venue: Croke Park, Dublin
- Man of the Match: Mark Kerins
- Referee: Johnny Ryan (Tipperary)

The 2011 All-Ireland Senior Club Hurling Championship final was a hurling match played at Croke Park on 17 March 2011 to determine the winners of the 2010–11 All-Ireland Senior Club Hurling Championship, the 41st season of the All-Ireland Senior Club Hurling Championship, a tournament organised by the Gaelic Athletic Association for the champion clubs of the four provinces of Ireland. The final was contested by Clarinbridge of Galway and O'Loughlin Gaels of Kilkenny, with Clarinbridge winning by 2-18 to 0-12.

The All-Ireland final was a unique occasion as it was the first ever championship meeting between Clarinbridge and O'Loughlin Gaels. It remains their only clash in the All-Ireland series. Both sides were hoping to claim a first All-Ireland title.

O'Loughlin Gaels began the game in determined fashion and there were few signs of early nerves in their first ever game at Croke Park. Mark Bergin was in prolific form and he opened the scoring after just 44 seconds. Bergin pointed again in the third minute before a brace of Danny Loughnane points helped the Gaels into a 0-4 to 0-00 lead. Clarinbridge hit back with an 11th-minute score from Eoin Forde, however, once Maurice Nolan slotted over his only point of the hour, it opened up an 0-8 to 0-3 lead for O'Loughlin Gaels. Clarinbridge utilised the three minutes of first-half injury-time to their full advantage. O'Loughlin Gaels goalkeeper Stephen Murphy was beaten when a long delivery from Alan Kerins dropped short for his brother Mark to flick the ball to the net. Clarinbridge were subsequently awarded a penalty, however, they had to be content with just a point from the resulting penalty strike as the half ended with the sides tied at 1-7 to 0-10.

Clarinbridge took the lead for the first time after the restart with a brace of points from the Kerins brothers. They outscored O'Loughlin Gaels by eight points to one over the third quarter and some of the best scores of the game were produced during this excellent spell. The lead stood at 1-15 to 0-12 in the 45th minute following Forde's second point, amid constant pressure on a now under-fire O'Loughlin Gaels defence. There was no sign of Clarinbridge easing up and once Forde delivered his side's second goal eight minutes from the end, it propelled them into a double-scores advantage at 2-18 to 0-12. Neither side was able to add to their tally as frustration set in for Gaels with substitute Séamie Cummins being red-carded in injury-time.

Clarinbridge's victory secured their first All-Ireland title. They became the 23rd club to win the All-Ireland title, while they were the sixth Galway representatives to claim the ultimate prize.

== Match ==
=== Details ===
17 March 2011

Clarinbridge	2-18 - 0-12	O'Loughlin Gaels
M Kerins 1-7 (4f, 1p), E Forde 1-4, A Kerins, E Collins 0-2 each, P Coen, E Murphy, J Cannon 0-1 each.	Report	M Bergin 0-6 (2f), A Geoghegan, D Loughnane 0-2 each, M Comerford, M Nolan 0-1 each.

Croke Park, Dublin
Referee: J Ryan (Tipperary)

Clarinbridge	O'Loughlin Gaels
