= Adrian Ronan =

Irish hurler

Adrian Ronnie Ronan
Personal information
- Native name: Adrian Ó Ronáin (Irish)
- Nickname: Ronnie
- Born: 8 June 1970 (age 56) Ballycallan, County Kilkenny, Ireland
- Occupation: Bank official

Sport
- Sport: Hurling
- Position: Forward
Club
- Years: Club
- 1988-2008: Graigue–Ballycallan
Club titles
- Kilkenny titles: 2
- Leinster titles: 1
- All-Ireland Titles: 0
Inter-county*
Years	County	Apps (scores)
1989-1998	Kilkenny	24 (5-72)
Inter-county titles
- Leinster titles: 3
- All-Irelands: 2
- NHL: 2
- All Stars: 4
- *Inter County team apps and scores correct as of 14:26, 10 January 2015.

Adrian Ronan (born 8 June 1970) is an Irish retired hurler who played as a full-forward for the Kilkenny senior team.

Born in Ballycallan, County Kilkenny, Ronan first played competitive hurling during his schooling at St. Kieran's College. He arrived on the inter-county scene at the age of seventeen when he first lined up with the Kilkenny minor team before later joining the under-21 side. He made his senior debut during the 1988-89 league. Ronan went on to become a regular member of the starting fifteen and won two All-Ireland medals, three Leinster medal and one National Hurling League medal. He was an All-Ireland runner-up on one occasion.

As a member of the Leinster inter-provincial team on a number of occasions, Ronan won one Railway Cup medal. At club level he is a one-time Leinster medallist with Graigue–Ballycallan.

Following his retirement from hurling Ronan immediately became involved in team management. He enjoyed a hugely successful tenure as manager of the Danesfort club side for four years. Ronan was appointed manager of the Kilkenny minor hurling team in November 2010.

Sporting positions
Preceded by Richie Mulrooney	Kilkenny Minor Hurling Manager; 2010-2012	Succeeded by Pat Hoban
