= 2003 All-Ireland Senior Hurling Championship =

Championship details
- Dates: 3 May – 7 September 2003
- Teams: 22

All-Ireland champions
- Winning team: Kilkenny (28th win)
- Captain: D. J. Carey
- Manager: Brian Cody

All-Ireland Finalists
- Losing team: Cork
- Captain: Alan Browne
- Manager: Dónal O'Grady

Provincial champions
- Munster: Cork
- Leinster: Kilkenny
- Ulster: Antrim
- Connacht: Not Played

Championship statistics
- No. matches played: 36
- Goals total: 113
- Points total: 1081
- Top Scorer: Joe Deane (4–29)
- Player of the Year: J. J. Delaney
- All-Star Team: See here

The 2003 All-Ireland Senior Hurling Championship (known for sponsorship reasons as the Guinness Hurling Championship) was the 117th since its establishment in 1887. The first matches of the season were played in May 2003, and the championship ended on 14 September 2003. Kilkenny went into the 2003 championship as defending champions, having won their twenty-seventh All-Ireland title the previous year.

The championship culminated with the All-Ireland final, held at Croke Park, Dublin. The match was contested by Kilkenny and Cork. It was their first meeting in the final since 1999. Kilkenny won the game by 1–14 to 1–11. It was their second All-Ireland title in succession.

== Team changes ==
=== To Championship ===
Promoted from the All-Ireland Senior B Hurling Championship

- Kerry

=== From Championship ===
Regraded to the All-Ireland Senior B Hurling Championship

- None

== Format ==
=== Leinster Championship ===
==== Participating counties (10) ====
Carlow, Dublin, Kildare, Kilkenny, Laois, Meath, Offaly, Westmeath, Wexford, Wicklow

==== Preliminary rounds (6 matches) ====
The lower ranked 7 teams in the province contest these rounds. The winners advance to the semi-finals and the losers advance to the All-Ireland qualifiers.

==== Semi-finals (2 matches) ====
The quarter-final winner and 3 highest ranked teams contest this round. The winners advance to the final and the losers advance to the All-Ireland qualifiers.

==== Final (1 match) ====
The 2 semi-final winners contest this game. The Leinster champions advance to the All-Ireland semi-finals and the Leinster runners-up advance to the All-Ireland qualifiers round 2.

=== Munster Championship ===
==== Participating counties (6) ====
Clare, Cork, Kerry, Limerick, Tipperary, Waterford

==== Quarter-finals (2 matches) ====
The lower ranked 4 teams in the province contest this round. The winners advance to the semi-finals and the losers advance to the All-Ireland qualifiers.

==== Semi-finals (2 matches) ====
The 2 quarter-final winners and 2 highest ranked teams contest this round. The winners advance to the final and the losers advance to the All-Ireland qualifiers.

==== Final (1 match) ====
The 2 semi-final winners contest this game. The Munster champions advance to the All-Ireland semi-finals and the Munster runners-up advance to the All-Ireland qualifiers round 2.

=== Ulster Championship ===
==== Participating counties (5) ====
Antrim, Derry, Down, London, New York

==== Quarter-finals (1 match) ====
The lower ranked 2 teams in the province contest this round. The winners advance to the semi-finals and the losers are eliminated from the championship.

==== Semi-finals (2 matches) ====
The quarter-final winners and 3 highest ranked teams contest this round. The winners advance to the final and the losers are eliminated from the championship.

==== Final (1 match) ====
The 2 semi-final winners contest this game. The Ulster champions advance to the All-Ireland quarter-finals and the Ulster runners-up advance to the All-Ireland qualifiers.

=== All-Ireland Championship ===
==== Quarter-finals (2 matches) ====
The 3 winners of the qualifiers join the Ulster champions to make up the quarter-final pairings. Teams who may have already met in the provincial championships are kept apart in separate quarter-finals. Two teams are eliminated at this stage while the winners advance to the semi-finals.

==== Semi-finals (2 matches) ====
The winners of the quarter-finals join the Leinster and Munster champions to make up the semi-final pairings. Teams who may have already met in the provincial championships are kept apart in separate semi-finals where possible. Two teams are eliminated at this stage while the winners advance to the final.

==== Final (1 match) ====
The two winners of the semi-finals contest this game.

== Teams ==
=== General information ===
Twenty two counties will compete in the All-Ireland Senior Hurling Championship: one team in the Connacht Senior Hurling Championship, ten teams in the Leinster Senior Hurling Championship, six teams in the Munster Senior Hurling Championship and five teams in the Ulster Senior Hurling Championship.

County	Last provincial title	Last championship title	Position in 2002 Championship	Current championship
Antrim	2002	—	Quarter-finals	Ulster Senior Hurling Championship
Carlow	—	—	First round (Leinster Senior Hurling Championship)	Leinster Senior Hurling Championship
Clare	1998	1997	Runners-up	Munster Senior Hurling Championship
Cork	2000	1999	Round 2	Munster Senior Hurling Championship
Derry	2001	—	Semi-finals (Ulster Senior Hurling Championship)	Ulster Senior Hurling Championship
Down	1997	—	Round 1	Ulster Senior Hurling Championship
Dublin	1961	1938	Round 1	Leinster Senior Hurling Championship
Galway	1999	1988	Quarter-finals	Connacht Senior Hurling Championship
Kerry	1891	1891	–	Munster Senior Hurling Championship
Kildare	—	—	First round (Leinster Senior Hurling Championship)	Leinster Senior Hurling Championship
Kilkenny	2002	2002	Champions	Leinster Senior Hurling Championship
Laois	1949	1915	Champions (All-Ireland Senior B Hurling Championship)	Leinster Senior Hurling Championship
Limerick	1996	1973	Round 1	Munster Senior Hurling Championship
London	—	1901	Quarter-finals (Ulster Senior Hurling Championship)	Ulster Senior Hurling Championship
Meath	—	—	Round 1	Leinster Senior Hurling Championship
New York	—	—	Semi-finals (Ulster Senior Hurling Championship)	Ulster Senior Hurling Championship
Offaly	1995	1998	Round 2	Leinster Senior Hurling Championship
Tipperary	2001	2001	Semi-finals	Munster Senior Hurling Championship
Waterford	2002	1959	Semi-finals	Munster Senior Hurling Championship
Westmeath	—	—	Second round (Leinster Senior Hurling Championship)	Leinster Senior Hurling Championship
Wexford	1997	1996	Round 2	Leinster Senior Hurling Championship
Wicklow	—	—	Runners-up (All-Ireland Senior B Hurling Championship)	Leinster Senior Hurling Championship

== Summary ==
=== Championships ===
Level on Pyramid	Competition	Champions	Runners-up
Tier 1	All-Ireland Senior Hurling Championship	Kilkenny	Cork
Tier 1	Leinster Senior Hurling Championship	Kilkenny	Wexford
Tier 1	Munster Senior Hurling Championship	Cork	Waterford
Tier 1	Ulster Senior Hurling Championship	Antrim	Derry
Tier 2	All-Ireland Senior B Hurling Championship	Wicklow	Roscommon
Tier 3	All-Ireland Intermediate Hurling Championship	Cork	Kilkenny
Tier 4	All-Ireland Junior Hurling Championship	Mayo	Donegal

== Provincial championships ==
=== Leinster Senior Hurling Championship ===
==== Bracket (Preliminary rounds) ====
Preliminary Quarter-finals
Laois	2–22
Wicklow	0–10
Meath	2–10
Carlow	0–17
Kildare	0–07
Westmeath	2–15

Preliminary Semi-finals
Laois	5–15
Carlow	1–10
Dublin	4–17
Westmeath	0–13

Preliminary Final
Laois	2–15, 0–15
Dublin	1–18, 3–11

==== Bracket (Final rounds) ====
Semi-finals
Kilkenny	3–16
Dublin	0–10
Wexford	0–16
Offaly	1–12

Final
Kilkenny	2–23
Wexford	2–12

==== Preliminary rounds ====
May 3
Preliminary round
Quarter-final

Kildare	0–7 – 2–15	Westmeath
B. White (0–5), C. Boran (0–1), T. Spain (0–1).		D. Carty (1–3), F. Shaw (1–2), J. Shaw (0–6), P. Dowdall (0–2), A. Mitchell (0–2).

Conneff Park, Clane
Referee:

May 4
Preliminary round
Quarter-final

Meath	2–10 – 0–17	Carlow
N. Horan (1–3), E. Lynam (1–2), C. Keena (0–2), K. Callaghan (0–1), M. Cole (0–1), C. Sheridan (0–1).		Pat Coady (0–7), K. English (0–2), S. Smithers (0–2), R. Foley (0–2), P. Kehoe (0–2), D. Murphy (0–1), B. Murphy (0–1), G. Doyle (0–1).

Páirc Tailteann, Navan
Referee: T McIntyre (Antrim)

May 5
Preliminary round
Quarter-final

Laois	2–22 – 0–10	Wicklow
Paul Cuddy (0–2), M McEvoy (1–0); J Young (0–7), R Jones (0–2); J Phelan (0–2), P Mahon (0–1), E Maher (0–1); B McCormack (0–3), L Tynan (1–3), L Wynne (0–1)		J Keogh (0–8, all frees); D Hyland (0–1), W O'Gorman (0–1)

O'Moore Park, Portlaoise
Referee: D Murphy (Wexford)

May 10
Preliminary round
Semi-final

Dublin	4–17 – 0–13	Westmeath
G. Ennis (2–2), K. Flynn (1–3), D. Russell (1–1), L. Ryan (0–4), C. Keaney (0–3), T. McGrane (0–2), K. Horgan (0–1), M. Carton (0–1).		A. Mitchell (0–6), P, Dowdall (0–3), F. Shaw (0–1), N. Williams (0–1), J. Shaw (0–1), J. Forbes (0–1).

Parnell Park, Dublin
Referee:

May 10
Preliminary round
Semi-final

Laois	5–15 – 1–10	Carlow
J Young 0–4 (3f), R Jones (1–5); J Phelan (1–1), P Mahon (0–1), B McCormack (0–2), L Tynan (1–1), D Culleton (2–1)		P Coady (0–5 (4f, 1 ‘65’)), K English (0–1); S Smithers (0–1), G Doyle (0–1); Des Murphy (1–1), P Coady (0–1)

O'Moore Park, Portlaoise
Referee: J Sexton (Limerick)

May 25
Preliminary round
Final

Dublin	1–18 – 2–15	Laois
M Carton (0–1), D Russell (0–1), K Flynn (1–0), T McGrane (0–13 (9 frees, 2 65s)), Shane Martin (0–2), G Ennis ( 0–1)		D Rooney (0–1), J Young (0–11 (8 frees, 1 65)), R Jones (0–1), T Fitzgerald (1–0), L Tynan (0–1), D Culleton (1–1)

Nowlan Park, Kilkenny
Referee: J Sexton (Limerick)

May 31
Preliminary round
Final Replay

Dublin	3–11 – 0–15	Laois
T McGrane 2–3 (1f); S Martin 0–5; G Ennis 1–1; C Keaney 0–2 (1f, 1 65)		J Young 0–8 (5fs, 1 65); M McEvoy and R Jones 0–2 each; D Cuddy, J Phelan, L Tynan 0–1 each

Nowlan Park, Kilkenny
Referee:

==== Semi-finals ====
June 7
Semi-final

Kilkenny	3–16 – 0–10	Dublin
H. Shefflin 1–4 (0–1 free); T. Walsh 0–5; M. Comerford 0–3; E. Brennan 1–0; C. Phelan 1–0; DJ Carey 0–2 (0–1 free); R. Mullally 0–2 (0–1 free)		T. McGrane 0–4 (all frees); C. Keaney 0–2; K. Flynn 0–2 (0–1 65); S. Martin, S. Hiney, 0–1 each

Nowlan Park, Kilkenny
Referee: B. Kelly (Westmeath)

June 8
Semi-final

Wexford	0–16 – 1–12	Offaly
P. Codd 0–7 (0–5 from frees; 0–2 from 65s), M. Jordan, R. Jacob 0–2 each, R. McCarthy, B. Goff, C. McGrath, M. Jacob, D. Fitzhenry (pen.) 0–1 each		R. Hanniffy 1–1, G. Hanniffy, B. Carroll, M. Cordial 0–2, D. Murray 0–2 (from frees), Brian Whelehan 0–2 (frees), Barry Whelehan 0–1

Nowlan Park, Kilkenny
Referee: P. O’Connor (Limerick)

==== Leinster final ====
July 6
Final

Kilkenny	2–23 – 2–12	Wexford
H. Shefflin 1–8 (0–5 frees); E. Brennan 1–1; T. Walsh, D.J. Carey (0–1 free, 0–1 seventy) and D. Lyng 0–3 each; S. Dowling (0–1 free) and M. Comerford 0–2 each; C. Phelan 0–1		B. Lambert 1–1; M. Jacob and P. Codd (0–3 frees), 0–4 each; C. McGrath 1–0; D. Stamp, A. Fenlon and B. Goff 0–1 each

Croke Park, Dublin
Referee: A. MacSuibhne (Dublin)

=== Munster Senior Hurling Championship ===
==== Bracket ====
Quarter-finals
Waterford	2–26
Kerry	1–12
Clare	2–17
Tipperary	0–14

Semi-finals
Waterford	4–13, 1–12
Limerick	4–13, 0–13
Cork	1–18
Clare	0–10

Final
Waterford	3–12
Cork	3–16

==== Quarter-finals ====
May 11
Quarter-final

Waterford	2–26 – 1–12	Kerry
D. Bennett (0–10, 0–7 frees, 0–1 [65]); P. Flynn (2–2); K. McGrath (0–7); A. Moloney (0–2); E. Kelly (0–2); T. Browne, S. Prendergast, D. Shanahan(0–1) each		S. Brick (0–8, 0–3 frees); J. M. Dooley (1–0); M. Slattery, O. O’Connell, B. Brick, L. Boyle (0–1) each

Walsh Park, Waterford
Referee: P. Ahern (Carlow)

May 18
Quarter-final

Clare	2–17 – 0–14	Tipperary
N. Gilligan 0–6 (0–3 frees); A. Quinn 1–2; J. O'Connor 1–1; C. Lynch 0–2; A. Markham 0–2; T. Carmody, T. Griffin, D. McMahon, S. McMahon (free), 0–1 each		E. Kelly 0–7 (0–4 frees); B. O'Meara 0–3; T. Dunne, C. Gleeson, L. Cahill, J. Carroll, 0–1 each

Páirc Uí Chaoimh, Cork
Referee: A. Mac Suibhne (Dublin)

==== Semi-finals ====
June 1
Semi-final

Waterford	4–13 – 4–13	Limerick
P. Flynn 3–3 (1–2 frees); J. Mullane 1–0; D. Bennett 0–3 (0–1 free); E. Kelly 0–3; K. McGrath 0–3; A. Moloney 0–1		C. Fitzgerald 1–4 (0–2 frees); A. O'Shaughnessy, M. Foley (1–0 free) and N. Moran 1–1 each; B. Begley 0–2; P. Kirby (free), D. Sheehan, E. Foley and T.J. Ryan 0–1 each

Semple Stadium, Thurles
Referee: P. Aherne (Carlow)

June 8
Semi-final
Replay

Waterford	1–12 – 0–13	Limerick
P. Flynn 1–7 (0–3 frees); D. Bennett 0–2 frees; E. Kelly, D. Shanahan and E. McGrath 0–1 each		C. Fitzgerald 0–6 (0–4 frees); E. Foley 0–3 (0–1 free); B. Begley 0–2; P. Kirby and C. Carey 0–1 each

Semple Stadium, Thurles
Referee: D. Murphy (Wexford)

June 9
Semi-final

Cork	1–18 – 0–10	Clare
J. Deane 1–8 (0–7 frees); S. O hAilpín 0–3; N. McCarthy 0–2; J. Gardiner (free), T. McCarthy, D. O'Sullivan (free), B. O'Connor and M. O'Connell 0–1 each		N. Gilligan 0–4 (0–1 free); T. Carmody 0–3; B. Murphy, C. Plunkett (seventy) and A. Markham 0–1 each

Semple Stadium, Thurles
Referee: W. Barrett (Tipperary)

==== Munster final ====
June 29
Final

Cork	3–16 – 3–12	Waterford
J. Deane 1–4 (0–2 frees); A. Browne 1–1; B. O'Connor 0–4; J. Gardiner 0–4 (0–2 frees, 0–1 seventy); S. O hAilpín 1–0; N. McCarthy 0–2; T. Kenny 0–1		J. Mullane 3–1; D. Bennett 0–4; D. Bennett 0–4 (0–2 frees); P. Flynn 0–4 (0–1 free); E. Kelly, E. McGrath and T. Browne 0–1 each

Semple Stadium, Thurles
Referee: P. O'Connor (Limerick)

=== Ulster Senior Hurling Championship ===
==== Bracket ====
Quarter-finals
Antrim	8–27
London	1–05

Semi-finals
New York	1–10
Derry	0–15
Antrim	0–21
Down	2–12

Final
Derry	1–12
Antrim	3–21

==== Preliminary round ====
May 11
Preliminary round

Antrim	8–27 – 1–5	London
B. McFall (3–7), G. O'Kane (2–5), A. Mort (2–1), C. McGuckian (0–7), P. Richmond (1–3), P. Close (0–1), J. Boyle (0–1), M. Herron (0–1), K. McKeegan (0–1).		M. O'Hara (1–4), K. Murray (0–1).

Casement Park, Belfast
Referee:

==== Semi-finals ====
May 11
Semi-final

New York	1–10 – 0–15	Derry
T. Fletcher (0–8), R. Ryan (1–0), M. Stretch (0–1), J. Maddem (0–1).		O. Collins (0–7), J. O'Dwyer (0–5), R. Convery (0–1), D. McGrellis (0–1).

Gaelic Park, New York City
Referee:

May 18
Semi-final

Antrim	0–21 – 2–12	Down
B McFall 0–7 (0–6, 1 sideline), L Richmond 0–4, C McGuckian 0–3, G O'Kane, L Watson 0–2 each, P Richmond, A Delargy, Darren Quinn 0–1 each		S Clarke 1–7 (0-7f), G Savage 1–1, G Johnson 0–2, G Adair, S Wilson (f) 0–1 each

Casement Park, Belfast
Referee: B Kelly (Westmeath)

==== Ulster final ====
June 14
Final

Antrim	3–21 – 1–12	Derry
J Connolly (0–1), P Richmond (0–3), C McGuckian (0–1), L Richmond (0–2), L Watson (0–4), A Delargy (1–1), B McFall (2–9, 0-4f)		P O’Kane (0–1), R Convery (0–1), Gregory Biggs (1–2), O Collins (0–6, 4f), R Kennedy (0–1), M Collins (0–1)

Casement Park, Belfast
Referee: B Kelly (Westmeath)

== All-Ireland qualifiers ==
=== Preliminary Rounds ===
May 31
Preliminary round 1

Kerry	3–15 – 0–13	Westmeath
D Young (0–1), P O’Connell (1–3, 1f), B Brick (0–1), L Boyle (0–1), S Brick (1–1), M Slattery (1–5, 3f), I McCarthy (0–1)		B Murtagh 0–1, N Gavin 0–1, P Dowdall 0–2, J Shaw 0–4 (2f), B Kennedy 0–1; A Mitchell 0–4 (2f)

McDonagh Park, Nenagh
Referee:

June 7
Preliminary round 2

Kerry	3–15 – 3–7	Carlow
M. Slattery (1–6), S. Brick (1–3), M. Conway (1–1), P. O'Connell (0–3), G. O'Brien (0–1), L. Boyle (0–1).		P. Coady (0–4), D. Murphy (1–0), A. Quirke (1–0), S. Murphy (1–0), K. English (0–2), R. Foley (0–1).

Semple Stadium, Thurles
Referee:

June 21
Preliminary round 3

Kerry	2–15 – 1–16	Derry
M Slattery 1–8 (6f, 1 '65); J M Dooley 1–1; P O'Connell 0–3; G O'Brien, K O'Sullivan, B Brick 0–1 each		O Collins 0–15 (14f); M Conway 1–0; L Hinphey 0–1

O'Connor Park, Tullamore
Referee: E MOrris (Dublin)

=== Round 1 ===
June 14
Round 1

Clare	2–11 – 1–15	Galway
J Reddan (0–1), T Griffin (1–3), N Gilligan (0–6, 4f 1 65), B Murphy (1–1),		A Kerins (0–2), R Gantley (0–6 frees), (O Fahy 1–1), D Tierney (0–2), M Kerins (0–1), K Broderick (0–2)

Cusack Park, Ennis
Referee: A Mac Suibhne (Dublin)

June 14
Round 1

Tipperary	3–28 – 0–13	Laois
P Kelly (0–3, 165, 1f), M O’Leary (0–3), C Gleeson (0–3), G O’Grady (0–2)), J Carroll (0–1), E Kelly (2–8), D Byrne (0–6, 2f), B O’Meara (1–1), L Corbett (0–1))		C Coonan (0–1)), J Young (0–5, 1pen, 165, 2f), J Phelan (0–1), E Maher (0–2)), L Tynan (0–1), B McCormack (0–2), D Cuddy (0–1)

O'Moore Park, Portlaoise
Referee: T. McIntyre (Antrim)

June 14
Round 1

Offaly	1–20 – 1–14	Dublin
Barry Whelehan (0–4), B. Carroll (0–4), D. Murray (0–4), N. Coughlan (1–0), R. Hanniffy (0–3), M. Cordial (0–2), S. Brown (0–1), S. Whelehan (0–1), Brian Whelehan (0–1).		T. McGrane (0–8), M. Carton (1–3), K. Flynn (0–2), C. Keaney (0–1).

Croke Park, Dublin
Referee: G. Harrington (Cork)

June 28
Round 1

Kerry	1–14 – 0–24	Limerick
S. Brick (1–5), L. Boyle (0–4), M. Slattery (0–3), B. Brick (0–1), P. O'Connell (0–1).		C. Fitzgerald (0–10), N. Moran (0–6), B. Begley (0–3), A. O'Shaughnessy (0–2), D. Sheehan (0–1), O. Moran (0–1), P. Lawlor (0–1).

Austin Stack Park, Tralee
Referee: S McMahon (Clare)

=== Round 2 ===
July 13
Round 2

Galway	1–17 – 1–18	Tipperary
R. Gantley 0–7 (0–5 frees); D. Hayes 1–1; K. Broderick 0–2; D. Tierney 0–2; A. Kerins 0–2; O. Canning, R. Murray, O. Fahy, 0–1 each		L. Corbett 0–4; B. Dunne 1–1; M. O'Leary 0–3; B. O'Meara 0–2; J. Carroll 0–2; E. Kelly 0–2 (frees); P. Kelly, G. O'Grady, C. Gleeson, E. Enright, 0–1 each

Pearse Stadium, Galway
Attendance: 29,233
Referee: D Murphy (Wexford)

July 17
Round 2

Limerick	0–14 – 1–18	Offaly
C Fitzgerald 0–5 (0–3 frees); C Smith 0–2; N Moran 0–2; D Sheehan 0–2; J Meskell (free)		R Hanniffy 0–7 (0–5 frees), B Murphy 1–3; B Carroll 0–2; Barry Whelehan 0–2; C Gath 0–2; Brian Whelehan (65), S Whelehan, 0–1 each

Semple Stadium, Thurles
Referee: M Wadding (Waterford)

July 19
Round 2

Wexford	1–20 – 0–18	Waterford
P. Codd 0–8 (0–2 frees, 0–1 seventy), R. Jacob 1–3, M. Jordan 0–3, L. Murphy and M. Jacob 0–2 each, D. Stamp and A. Fenlon 0–1 each		J. Mullane and K. McGrath 0–5 each, P. Flynn 0–3 (0–2 frees), E. Murphy 0–2, D. Bennett, M. Walsh and D. Shanahan 0–1 each

Nowlan Park, Kilkenny
Referee: W Barrett (Tipperary)

== All-Ireland Senior Hurling Championship ==
=== Bracket ===
Teams in bold advanced to the next round. The provincial champions are marked by an asterisk.

Quarter-finals
**Tipperary**	**2–16**
Offaly	2–11
**Wexford**	**2–15**
Antrim*	2–12

Semi-finals
**Kilkenny***	**3–18**
Tipperary	0–15
Wexford	3–17, 2–07
**Cork***	2–20, **3–17**

Final
**Kilkenny***	**1–14**
Cork*	1–11

=== All-Ireland quarter-finals ===
July 27
Quarter-final

Tipperary	2–16 – 2–11	Offaly
E. Kelly 0–5 (0–3 frees); J. Carroll, B. O'Meara 1–0 each; P. Kelly 0–3 (0–1 free); T. Dunne 0–3 (0–2 '65's); B. Dunne, M. O'Leary, L. Corbett, E. Corcoran, C. Gleeson 0–1 each		G. Hanniffy 1–2; N. Coughlan 1–1; B. Carroll 0–2 frees; R. Hanniffy 0–2 (0–1 free); B. Murphy, C Cassidy, M. Cordial, S. Whelahan 0–1 each

Croke Park, Dublin
Referee: G Harrington (Cork) Match Report

July 27
Quarter-final

Wexford	2–15 – 2–12	Antrim
P Codd 1–7 (1–5 frees), C McGrath 1–0, L Murphy 0–3, R Jacob 0–2, M Jacob, R McCarthy, B Lambert 0–1 each		C Herron 1–2 (1–1 65), C McGuckian 1–1, A Delargy 0–4, B McFall 0–2 (0–1 free), J Watson, C Richmond, G O'Kane 0–1 each

Croke Park, Dublin
Referee: P Horan (Offaly) Match Report

=== All-Ireland semi-finals ===
August 10
Semi-final

Cork	2–20 – 3–17	Wexford
J. Deane 1–7 (0–4 frees); Setanta Ó hAilpín 1–3; J. Gardiner 0–4; A. Browne 0–2; N. McCarthy, B. O'Connor, T. McCarthy and M. O'Connell 0–1 each		P. Codd 1–5 (0–3 frees, 0–1 70); M. Jacob 1–4; R. McCarthy 1–0; A. Fenlon 0–3 (0–2 sideline); L. Murphy, M. Jordan 0–2 each; R. Jacob 0–1

Croke Park, Dublin
Attendance: 59,435
Referee: A. Mac Suibhne (Dublin) Match Report

August 16
Semi-final Replay

Cork	3–17 – 2–7	Wexford
J Deane 1–5 (4f), T McCarthy 1–1, B O'Connor 0–4, A Browne 1–0, J Gardiner 0–3 (2 '65', 1f), M O'Connell 0–2, N McCarthy, Setanta Ó hAilpín 0–1 each		M Jordan 1–2, L Murphy 1–0, P Codd 0–3 (3f), M Jacob, A Fenlon 0–1 each

Croke Park, Dublin
Attendance: 46,760
Referee: A. Mac Suibhne (Dublin) Match Report

August 17
Semi-final

Kilkenny	3–18 – 0–15	Tipperary
H. Shefflin 1–7 (0–5 frees); E. Brennan 1–4; T. Walsh 1–0; D.J. Carey 0–3 seventies; D. Lyng 0–2; J. Hoyne and J. Coogan 0–1 each		E. Kelly 0–8 (0–6 frees); C. Gleeson 0–2; P. Kelly, J. Carroll, P. O'Meara, E. Enright and P. O'Brien 0–1 each

Croke Park, Dublin
Attendance: 60,087
Referee: P. O'Connor (Limerick) Match Report

=== All-Ireland Final ===
September 7
Final

Kilkenny	1–14 – 1–11	Cork
M. Comerford 1–4; H. Shefflin 0–6 (0–4 frees); T. Walsh 0–3; D. Lyng 0–1		J. Deane 0–5 (0–4 frees); S. Ó hAilpín 1–0; N. McCarthy 0–2; T. McCarthy, B. O'Connor, J. O'Connor and S. McGrath 0–1 each

Croke Park, Dublin
Referee: P. O'Connor (Limerick) Match Report

== Championship statistics ==
=== Top scorers ===
==== Overall ====
Rank	Player	County	Tally	Total	Matches	Average
1	Joe Deane	Cork	4–29	41	5	8.2
2	Brian McFall	Antrim	5–25	40	4	10.0
2	Paul Codd	Wexford	2–34	40	6	6.67
4	Paul Flynn	Waterford	6–19	37	5	7.4
5	Tomás McGrane	Dublin	2–30	36	5	7.2
5	Eoin Kelly	Tipperary	2–30	36	5	7.2
7	James Young	Laois	0–35	35	5	7.0
8	Henry Shefflin	Kilkenny	3–25	34	4	8.5
9	Mike Slattery	Kerry	3–23	32	5	6.4
10	Ollie Collins	Derry	0–28	28	3	9.33

=== Scoring events ===
- Last goal of the championship: Martin Comerford for Kilkenny against Cork (All-Ireland final)
- First hat-trick of the championship: John Mullane for Waterford against Cork (Munster final)
- Widest winning margin: 43 points
  - Antrim 8–27 – 1-05 London (Ulster preliminary round)
- Most goals in a match: 9
  - Antrim 8–27 – 1-05 London (Ulster preliminary round)
- Most points in a match: 41
  - Tipperary 3–28 – 0–13 Laois (All-Ireland qualifiers)
- Most goals by one team in a match: 8
  - Antrim 8–27 – 1-05 London (Ulster preliminary round)
- Most goals scored by a losing team: 3
  - Waterford 3–12 – 3–16 Cork (Munster final)
  - Carlow 3-07 – 3–15 Waterford (Munster final)
- Most points scored by a losing team: 17
  - Galway 1–17 – 1–18 Tipperary (All-Ireland qualifiers)

=== Team statistics ===
- Most goals scored – Antrim (13)
- Most points scored – Tipperary (91)
- Most goals conceded – Carlow and Wexford (10)
- Most points conceded – Wexford (102)
- Fewest goals scored – Kildare and Wicklow (0)
- Fewest points scored – Kildare (7)
- Fewest points conceded – Kildare (15)
- Fewest goals conceded – Wicklow (0)

== Miscellaneous ==
- First-time championship meetings:
  - Kerry v Westmeath (Qualifiers preliminary round)
  - Kerry v Carlow (Qualifiers preliminary round)
  - Kerry v Derry (Qualifiers preliminary round)
  - Wexford v Waterford (Qualifiers round 2)
- Kerry return to the Munster Senior Hurling Championship for the first time since 2000.
- Kerry's wins over Westmeath, Carlow and Derry were the first time they won three All-Ireland Senior Hulring Championship matches in a row.

== See also ==
- 2003 All-Ireland Senior B Hurling Championship
- 2003 All-Ireland Intermediate Hurling Championship
- 2003 All-Ireland Junior Hurling Championship
