= 2002 All-Ireland Senior Hurling Championship =

Championship details
- Dates: 27 April - 8 September 2002
- Teams: 21

All-Ireland champions
- Winning team: Kilkenny (27th win)
- Captain: Andy Comerford
- Manager: Brian Cody

All-Ireland Finalists
- Losing team: Clare
- Captain: Brian Lohan
- Manager: Cyril Lyons

Provincial champions
- Munster: Waterford
- Leinster: Kilkenny
- Ulster: Antrim
- Connacht: Not Played

Championship statistics
- No. matches played: 30
- Top Scorer: Eoin Kelly (2–39)
- Player of the Year: Henry Shefflin
- All-Star Team: See here

The 2002 All-Ireland Senior Hurling Championship (known as the Guinness Hurling Championship for sponsorship reasons) was the 116th staging of the All-Ireland Senior Hurling Championship since its establishment by the Gaelic Athletic Association in 1887. The draws for the respective provincial championships took place on 27 October 2001. The championship ran from 27 April to 8 September 2002.

Tipperary entered the championship as the defending champions, however, they were beaten by Kilkenny in the All-Ireland semi-final.

The All-Ireland final was played on 8 September 2002 at Croke Park in Dublin, between Kilkenny and Clare, in what was their fourth championship meeting overall but their first All-Ireland final meeting in 70 years. Kilkenny won the match by 2–20 to 0–19 to claim their 27th All-Ireland title overall and a first title in two years.

Tipperary's Eoin Kelly was the championship's top scorer with 2–39.

== Teams ==
=== General information ===
Twenty one counties will compete in the All-Ireland Senior Hurling Championship: one team in the Connacht Senior Hurling Championship, ten teams in the Leinster Senior Hurling Championship, five teams in the Munster Senior Hurling Championship and five teams in the Ulster Senior Hurling Championship.

County	Last provincial title	Last championship title	Position in 2001 Championship
Antrim	1999	–	Semi-finals (Ulster Senior Hurling Championship)
Carlow	–	–	Second preliminary round (Leinster Senior Hurling Championship)
Clare	1998	1997	Semi-finals (Munster Senior Hurling Championship)
Cork	2000	1999	Quarter-finals (Munster Senior Hurling Championship)
Derry	2001	–	Quarter-finals
Down	1997	–	Runners-up (Ulster Senior Hurling Championship)
Dublin	1961	1938	Quarter-finals (Leinster Senior Hurling Championship)
Galway	1999	1988	Runners-up
Kildare	–	–	Second preliminary round (Leinster Senior Hurling Championship)
Kilkenny	2001	2000	Semi-finals
Laois	1949	1915	Semi-finals (Leinster Senior Hurling Championship)
Limerick	1996	1973	Quarter-finals
London	–	1901	Semi-finals (Ulster Senior Hurling Championship)
Meath	–	–	First round (Leinster Senior Hurling Championship)
New York	–	–	Quarter-finals (Ulster Senior Hurling Championship)
Offaly	1995	1998	Semi-finals (Leinster Senior Hurling Championship)
Tipperary	2001	2001	Champions
Waterford	1963	1959	Semi-finals (Munster Senior Hurling Championship)
Westmeath	–	–	First preliminary round (Leinster Senior Hurling Championship)
Wexford	1997	1996	Semi-finals
Wicklow	–	–	First preliminary round (Leinster Senior Hurling Championship)

=== All-Ireland final ===
The new Qualifier system threw up an interesting pairing in the All-Ireland final. It was the Leinster champions Kilkenny versus Clare, who were knocked out of the provincial championship in the very first round. Kilkenny had the upper hand for the whole game as D.J. Carey and Henry Shefflin scored goals for Kilkenny. Clare narrowed Kilkenny's lead in the second half, however, they missed two goal chances. Kilkenny won the title for the 27th time.

== Leinster Senior Hurling Championship ==
April 27
First Round

Laois	1–12 – 0–9	Wicklow
D. Rooney (1–1), D. Cuddy (0–4), B. Ferns (0–2), J. O'Shea (0–2), N. Rigney (0–1), J. Coogan (0–1), J. Phelan (0–1).	Report	L. Glynn (0–3), D. Hyland (0–3), T. McGrath (0–2), M. O'Brien (0–1).

Aughrim Park, Aughrim
Referee: J. Sexton (Cork))

April 28
First Round

Westmeath	1–14 – 1–10	Kildare
A. Mitchell (1–9), A. Devine (0–2), B. Murtagh (0–1), V. Bateman (0–1), B. Kennedy (0–1).	Report	J. Dempsey (1–1), C. Buggy (0–3), T. Spain (0–3), T. Carew (0–2), C. Boran (0–1).

Cusack Park, Mullingar
Referee: J. A. Gribeen (Down))

April 28
First Round

Carlow	0–9 – 1–9	Meath
Pat Coady (0–4), D. Murphy (0–2), G. Doyle (0–1), T. Walsh (0–1), J. Hickey (0–1).	Report	J. O'Toole (0–4), N. Reilly (1–0), D. Dorran (0–2), T. Reilly (0–2), N. Horan (0–1).

Dr. Cullen Park, Carlow
Referee: D. Kirwan (Cork))

May 12
Second Round

Meath	2–16 – 1–18	Laois
N. Horan (1–11), M. Cole (1–1), J. O'Toole (0–2), T. Reilly (0–1), E. Lynam (0–1).	Report	M. Dunphy (0–6), D. Culleton (1–2), D. Cuddy (0–3), D. Rooney (0–2), P. J. Peacock (0–1), N. Rigney (0–1), R. Delaney (0–1), J. Phelan (0–1), B. Ferns (0–1).

Páirc Tailteann, Navan
Referee: G. Devlin (Armagh))

May 12
Second Round

Westmeath	1–12 – 2–12	Dublin
J. Shaw (1–2), A. Mitchell (0–4), V. Bateman (0–2), J. Brennan (0–1), D. McCormack (0–1), D. Carty (0–1), G. Briody (0–1).	Report	S. Martin (2–3), K. Flynn (0–3), P. O'Donoghue (0–3), C. Wilson (0–1), T. Moore (0–1), C. Meehan (0–1).

Cusack Park, Mullingar
Referee: T. McIntyre (Antrim))

May 26
Quarter-Final

Dublin	1–24 – 2–12	Meath
K. Flynn (0–12), D. Spain (1–1), S. Martin (0–3), T. McGrane (0–2), C. Keaney (0–2), D. O'Reilly (0–1), K. Ryan (0–1), D. McSweeney (0–1), P. O'Donoghue (0–1).	Report	N. Horan (2–5), C. Sheridan (0–2), J. Toole (0–2), E. Lynam, (0–2), D. Dorran (0–1).

O'Connor Park, Tullamore
Referee: J. Sexton (Limerick))

June 9
Semi-Final

Wexford	3–15 – 2–12	Dublin
L. O'Gorman (2–1), B. Lambert (1–2), R. McCarthy (0–4), M. Jordan (0–4), P. Codd (0–4).	Report	K. Flynn (1–2), S. Martin (1–1), D. Sweeney (0–2), T. McGrane (0–1), L. Ryan (0–1), S. Hiney (0–1), D. Donnelly (0–1), T. Moore (0–1), P. O'Donoghue (0–1), D. O'Reilly (0–1).

Semple Stadium, Thurles
Referee: J. McDonnell (Tipperary))

June 9
Semi-Final

Kilkenny	2–20 – 1–14	Offaly
H. Shefflin (0–11), E. Brennan (1–1), J. Hoyne (1–0), C. Carter (0–4), B. McEvoy (0–2) P. Tennyson (0–1), D. Lyng (0–1).	Report	S. Whelahan (0–7), B. Murphy (1–2), S. Brown (0–2), B. Carroll (0–2), R. Hanniffy (0–1).

Semple Stadium, Thurles
Referee: W. Barrett (Tipperary))

July 7
Final

Kilkenny	0–19 – 0–17	Wexford
H. Shefflin (0–8), B. McEvoy (0–4), R. Mullally (0–2), D. Lyng (0–2), E. Brennan (0–2), B. Dowling (0–1).	Report	P. Codd (0–13), B. Lambert (0–1), L. Murphy (0–1), M. Jordan (0–1) M. J. Furlong (0–1).

Croke Park, Dublin
Attendance: 37,567
Referee: G. Harrington (Cork))

== Munster Senior Hurling Championship ==
May 19
Quarter-Final

Tipperary	1–18 – 2–13	Clare
E. Kelly (1–8), C. Gleeson (0–2), N. Morris (0–2), T. Dunne (0–2), B. O'Meara (0–1), J. O'Brien (0–1), E. O'Neill (0–1), B. Dunne (0–1).	Report	D. Forde (2–0), T. Griffin (0–6), J. Reddan (0–3), J. O'Connor (0–2), T. Carmody (0–1), N. Gilligan (0–1).

Páirc Uí Chaoimh, Cork
Referee: M. Healy (Cork))

May 26
Semi-Final

Waterford	1–16 – 1–15	Cork
P. Flynn (0–12), T. Browne (1–0), K. McGrath (0–2), J. Mullane (0–1), S. Prendergast (0–1).	Report	B. O'Connor (0–8), E. Collins (1–1), J. Deane (0–3), T. McCarthy (0–2), S. McGrath (0–1).

Semple Stadium, Thurles
Referee: D. Murphy (Wexford))

June 2
Semi-Final

Tipperary	1–20 – 1–13	Limerick
E. Kelly (0–12), J. Carroll (1–2), B. Dunne (0–2), T. Dunne (0–1), N. Morris (0–1), B. O'Meara (0–1), C. Gleeson (0–1).	Report	M. Keane (0–8), O. Moran (1–0), P. Lawlor (0–2), O. O'Neill (0–1), J. Butler (0–1), B. Foley (0–1).

Páirc Uí Chaoimh, Cork
Referee: A. Mac Suibhne (Dublin))

June 30
Final

Waterford	2–23 – 3–12	Tipperary
P. Flynn (1–6), K. McGrath (0–7), J. Mullane (0–4), T. Browne (1–0), E. Kelly (0–3), D. Bennett (0–1), E. McGrath (0–1), S. Prendergast (0–1).	Report	B. Dunne (2–2), E. Kelly (1–4), T. Dunne (0–2), L. Corbett (0–1), C. Gleeson (0–1), J. Carroll (0–1), B. O’Meara (0–1).

Páirc Uí Chaoimh, Cork
Referee: A. Mac Suibhne (Dublin))

== Ulster Senior Hurling Championship ==
May 12
Quarter-Final

Down	3–22 – 1–9	London
J. McGrattan (0–8), P. Braniff (1–4), P. Coulter (1–1), M. Coulter (1–0), G. Gordon (0–2), T. McMahon (0–1), L. Clarke (0–1), N. Sands (0–1), S. Wilson (0–1), T. Coulter (0–1), Gabriel Clarke (0–1), G. McGrattan (0–1).	Report	I. Rocks (1–5), C. Buckley (0–1), M. O'Dwyer (0–1), M. Gordon (0–1), P. Lynch (0–1).

Casement Park, Belfast
Referee: B. Kelly (Westmeath)

May 25
Semi-Final

Down	0–12 – 1–9	Derry
J. McGrattan (0–4), G. McGrattan (0–2), N. Sands (0–1), G. Adair (0–1), P. Braniff (0–1), J. Trainor (0–1), M. Coulter (0–1), P. Monan (0–1).	Report	G. McGonagle (0–5), J. O'Dwyer (1–1), O. Collins (0–3).

Casement Park, Belfast
Referee: J. Neary (Kilkenny)

May 26
Semi-Final

New York	2–11 – 5–19	Antrim
M. Finn (1–2), J. O'Callaghan (1–2), O. Cummins (0–2), J. Madden (0–1), K. Kennedy (0–1), T. Simms (0–1), S. Nolan (0–1), B. Ryan (0–1).	Report	A. Delargy (2–7), L. Watson (3–2), P. Richmond (0–2), J. Connolly (0–2), G. O'Kane (0–2), L. Richmond (0–2), S. Delargy (0–1), C. Cunning (0–1).

Gaelic Park, New York City
Referee: G. Harrington (Cork)

June 1
Semi-Final Replay

Down	2–12 – 1–12	Derry
N. Sands (1–3), P. Braniff (0–4), M. Coulter (1–0), T. Coulter (0–2), G. McGrattan (0–2), M. Braniff (0–1).	Report	Gregory Biggs (0–6), J. O'Dwyer (1–0), O. Collins (0–3), C. McGonagle (0–1), D. Magill (0–1), Gary Biggs (0–1).

Casement Park, Belfast
Referee: P. Horan (Offaly)

June 9
Final

Antrim	3–16 – 1–18	Down
L. Watson (0–9), G. O'Kane (1–2), C. McGuckian (1–0), L. Richmond (0–2), B. McFall (0–1), S. Delargy (0–1), J. Connolly (0–1).	Report	G. McGrattan (0–6), P. Braniff (0–6), P. Coulter (1–2), M. Braniff (0–2), E. Trainor (0–1), G. Gordon (0–1).

Casement Park, Belfast
Referee: M. Wadding (Waterford)

== All-Ireland Qualifiers ==
=== Round 1 ===
June 15
Round 1

Clare	3–22 – 1–8	Dublin
N. Gilligan (1–4), C. Earlie (1–3), T. Griffin (0–6), G. Considine (1–0), S. McMahon (0–3), C. Lynch (0–2), J. Reddan (0–1), C. Plunkett (0–1), J. O'Connor (0–1), D. Forde (0–1).	Report	C. Keaney (0–5), L. Ryan (1–0), P. O'Donoghue (0–2), T. McGrane (0–1).

Parnell Park, Dublin
Referee: P. Ahern (Carlow))

June 15
Round 1

Meath	1–11 – 1–20	Offaly
N. Horan (1–3), M. Cole (0–4), E. Lynam (0–3), T. Reilly (0–1).	Report	B. Murphy (1–1), S. Whelehan (0–4), J. Dooley (0–3), B. Carroll (0–3), R. Hanniffy (0–3), S. Browne (0–2), D. Murray (0–2), G. Oakley (0–1), B. Whelehan (0–1).

Páirc Tailteann, Navan
Referee: S. McMahon (Clare))

June 15
Round 1

Galway	7–15 – 0–13	Down
F. Healy (3–2), O. Fahy (1–4), A. Kerins (1–1), M. Kerins (1–1), D. Tierney (1–1), R. Gantley (0–3), D. Hayes (0–2), L. Hodgins (0–1).	Report	P. Braniff (0–4), G. McGrattan (0–3), P. Coulter (0–2), M. Coulter (0–2), M. Braniff (0–1), G. Savage (0–1).

Casement Park, Belfast
Referee: P. Dunphy (Kilkenny))

June 29
Round 1

Cork	1–16 – 1–15	Limerick
A. Browne (1–0), B. O'Connor (0–3), J. Gardiner (0–3), J. Deane (0–3), T. McCarthy (0–2), A. Cummins (0–2), J. O'Connor (0–2), D. O’Sullivan (0–1).	Report	B. Begley (0–4), M. Keane (0–4), O. Moran (1–0) B. Foley (0–2), S. Lucey (0–2), B. Geary (0–1), C. Carey (0–1), P. Lawlor (0–1).

Semple Stadium, Thurles
Referee: B. Kelly (Westmeath)

=== Round 2 ===
July 13
Round 2

Tipperary	2–19 – 1–9	Offaly
B. O'Meara (1–2), J. Carroll (1–1), M. O'Leary (0–4), E. Kelly (0–4), P. Kelly (0–3), T. Dunne (0–2), B. Dunne (0–2), E. O'Neill (0–1).	Report	S. Brown (1–1), S. Whelehan (0–4), R. Hanniffy (0–1), Barry Whelehan (0–1), K. Martin (0–1), B. Carroll (0–1).

O'Moore Park, Portlaoise
Attendance: 20,000
Referee: M. Wadding (Waterford)

July 13
Round 2

Galway	0–21 – 1–9	Cork
E. Cloonan (0–9), F. Healy (0–3), R. Murray (0–2), K. Broderick (0–2), R. Gantley (0–2), D. Hardiman (0–1), M. Kerins (0–1), J. Rabbitte (0–1).	Report	J. Deane (1–4), B. O'Connor (0–3), N. Ronan (0–1), B. O'Keeffe (0–1).

Semple Stadium, Thurles
Referee: P. Horan (Offaly)

July 14
Round 2

Clare	3–15 – 3–7	Wexford
T. Carmody (2–1), N. Gilligan (1–2), C. Lynch (0–3), J. Reddan (0–3), T. Griffin (0–2), J. O'Connor (0–2), S. McMahon (0–1) (f), G. Considine (0–1).	Report	P. Codd (2–3), R. Jacob (1–0), M. J. Furlong (0–1), L. Murphy (0–1), R. McCarthy (0–1), M. Jordan (0–1).

O'Moore Park, Portlaoise
Referee: W. Barrett (Tipperary)

== All-Ireland Senior Hurling Championship ==
Quarter-finals; July 28
*	Kilkenny
Tipperary	1–25
*	Antrim	2–12
Clare	1–15
Galway	0–17
*	Waterford

Semi-finals; August 11 / August 18
Kilkenny	1–20
Tipperary	1–16
Clare	1–16
Waterford	1–13

Final; September 8
Kilkenny	2–20
Clare	0–19

Note: * = Provincial Champion

=== All-Ireland quarter-finals ===
July 28
Quarter-final

Tipperary	1–25 – 2–12	Antrim
E. Kelly (0–7), P. Kelly (0–5 (0–1), E. O'Neill (1–1), T. Dunne (0–3), B. Dunne (0–3), J. Carroll (0–2), B. O'Meara (0–2), L. Corbett (0–1), N. Morris (0–1).	Report	L. Watson (1–6), L. Richmond (1–1), P. Richmond (0–2), G. O'Kane (0–2), B. McFall (0–1).

Croke Park, Dublin
Attendance: 41,619
Referee: P. Ahern (Carlow)

July 28
Quarter-final

Clare	1–15 – 0–17	Galway
J. O'Connor (0–5), N. Gilligan (1–1), S. McMahon (0–4), G. Quinn (0–1), D. Forde (0–1), T. Carmody (0–1), T. Griffin (0–1), C. Lynch (0–1).	Report	E. Cloonan (0–4), K. Broderick (0–3), A. Kerins (0–3), D. Hayes (0–2), F. Healy (0–2), R. Murray (0–2), G. Farragher (0–1).

Croke Park, Dublin
Attendance: 41,619
Referee: P. Ahern (Carlow)

=== All-Ireland semi-finals ===
August 11
Semi-final

Clare	1–16 – 1–13	Waterford
A. Markham (1–1), J. O'Connor (0–3), S. McMahon (0–3), D. Forde (0–2), T. Carmondy (0–2), N. Gilligan (0–2), C. Lynch (0–1), T. Griffin (0–1), O. Baker (0–1).	Report	P. Flynn (1–4), E. Kelly (0–4), T. Browne (0–1), E. McGrath (0–1), A. Moloney (0–1), K. McGrath (0–1), J. Mullane (0–1).

Croke Park, Dublin
Attendance: 57,724
Referee: P. O'Connor (Limerick)

August 18
Semi-final

Kilkenny	1–20 – 1–16	Tipperary
H. Shefflin (0–7), J. Coogan (1–1), D. J. Carey (0–4), D. Lyng (0–2), A. Comerford (0–2), M. Comerford (0–1), J. Hoyne (0–1), E. Brennan (0–1), C. Carter (0–1).	Report	E. Kelly (0–4), J. Carroll (1–0), M. O'Leary (0–3), P. Kelly (0–3), E. O'Neill (0–2), T. Dunne (0–1), B. O'Meara (0–1), L. Corbett (0–1), E. Corcoran (0–1).

Croke Park, Dublin
Attendance: 53,385
Referee: A. Mac Suibhne (Dublin)

=== All-Ireland Final ===
September 8
Final

Kilkenny	2–20 – 0–19	Clare
H. Shefflin (1–7), D. J. Carey (1–6), M. Comerford (0–1), E. Brennan (0–1), A. Comerford (0–1), J. Coogan (0–1), D. Lyng (0–1), B. McEvoy (0–1), C. Carter (0–1).	Report	S. McMahon (0–6), J. O'Connor (0–4), C. Lynch (0–2), N. Gilligan (0–2), G. Considine (0–2), T. Griffin (0–1), O. Baker (0–1), A. Quinn (0–1).

Croke Park, Dublin
Attendance: 76,254
Referee: A. Mac Suibhne (Dublin)

== Championship statistics ==
=== Top scorers ===
Overall

Rank	Player	County	Tally	Total	Matches	Average
1	Eoin Kelly	Tipperary	2–39	45	6	7.50
2	Henry Shefflin	Kilkenny	1–33	36	4	9.00
3	Nicky Horan	Meath	4–20	32	4	8.00
4	Liam Watson	Antrim	4–17	29	3	9.66
5	Paul Flynn	Waterford	2–22	28	3	9.33
6	Paul Codd	Wexford	2–20	26	3	8.66
7	Paul Braniff	Down	1–19	22	5	4.40
8	Niall Gilligan	Clare	3–12	21	6	3.50
9	Kevin Flynn	Dublin	1–17	20	4	5.00
10	Seánie McMahon	Clare	0–17	17	6	2.83
10	Jamesie O'Connor	Clare	0–17	17	6	2.83

In a single game

Rank	Player	County	Tally	Total	Opposition
1	Nicky Horan	Meath	1–11	14	Laois
2	Aidan Delargy	Antrim	2-07	13	New York
2	Paul Codd	Wexford	0–13	13	Kilkenny
4	Andrew Mitchell	Westmeath	1-09	12	Kildare
4	Kevin Flynn	Dublin	0–12	12	Meath
4	Paul Flynn	Waterford	0–12	12	Cork
4	Eoin Kelly	Tipperary	0–12	12	Limerick
8	Liam Watson	Antrim	3-02	11	New York
8	Fergal Healy	Galway	3-02	11	Down
8	Nicky Horan	Meath	2-05	11	Dublin
8	Eoin Kelly	Tipperary	1-08	11	Clare
8	Henry Shefflin	Kilkenny	0–11	11	Offaly
