= Eddie O'Connor (hurler) =

Irish hurler and manager

Eddie O’Connor
Personal information
- Native name: Éamonn Ó Conchúir (Irish)
- Born: 2 October 1964 (age 62) Glenmore, County Kilkenny, Ireland
- Occupation: Foundry worker
- Height: 5 ft 9 in (175 cm)

Sport
- Sport: Hurling
- Position: Right corner-back
Club
- Years: Club
- Glenmore
Club titles
- Kilkenny titles: 5
- Leinster titles: 2
- All-Ireland Titles: 1
Inter-county*
Years	County	Apps (scores)
1991–1998	Kilkenny	23 (0-00)
Inter-county titles
- Leinster titles: 3
- All-Irelands: 2
- NHL: 1
- All Stars: 1
- *Inter County team apps and scores correct as of 22:07, 4 May 2020.

Edward O’Connor (born 2 October 1964) is an Irish hurling manager and former player who played for Kilkenny Senior Championship club Glenmore. He played for the Kilkenny senior hurling team for eight seasons, during which time he usually lined out as a right corner-back.

O'Connor began his hurling career at club level with Glenmore. He broke onto the club's top adult team, having earlier lined out for the club's junior team, and enjoyed his greatest success when was at right corner-back on Glenmore's All-Ireland Club Championship-winning team in 1991. O'Connor's club career also saw him claim two Leinster Club Championship titles and five Kilkenny Senior Championship titles.

At inter-county level, O'Connor was part of the successful Kilkenny minor team that won the All-Ireland Minor Championship in 1981 before later winning an All-Ireland Under-21 Championship with the under-21 team in 1984. He joined the Kilkenny senior team in 1991. From his debut, O'Connor was ever-present as a defender and made 23 Championship appearances in a career that ended with his last game in 1998. During that time he was part of two All-Ireland Championship-winning teams – in 1992 and as captain of the team in 1993. O'Connor also secured three successive Leinster Championship medals and a National Hurling League medal. He was joined on the Kilkenny senior team by his brother, Willie O'Connor.

== Playing career ==
=== Glenmore ===
O'Connor joined the Glenmore club at a young age and played in all grades at juvenile and underage levels before eventually joining the club's top adult team in the Kilkenny Senior Championship.

On 29 September 1985, O'Connor was selected at left corner-back for his first final appearance. He ended the game on the losing side after Glenmore suffered a 4–18 to 3–13 defeat by Ballyhale Shamrocks.

O'Connor lined out in a second final on 1 November 1987 when Glenmore faced Ballyhale Shamrocks for the second time in three championship seasons. He ended the game with his first winners' medal after the 4–10 to 3–09 victory.

For the third time in five seasons, Glenmore and Ballyhale Shamrocks clashed in the final of the Kilkenny Senior Championship when they faced each other on 1 October 1989. O'Connor lined out in his customary position of left corner-back but ended the game on the losing side for the second time in his career after the 2–11 to 1–13 defeat.

On 7 October 1990, O'Connor lined out in the fourth final of his career when Glenmore faced Clara. Playing at right corner-back, he claimed a second winners' medal after the 3–15 to 2–06 victory. On 25 November 1990, O'Connor claimed his first Leinster Club Championship medal after Glenmore's 0–15 to 1–09 victory over Camross. The subsequent All-Ireland final on 17 March 1991 saw Glenmore faced Patrickswell at Croke Park. O'Connor was selected at right corner back and claimed an All-Ireland medal after the 1–13 to 0–12 victory.

For the fifth time in his career, O'Connor lined out in the county final on 11 October 1992 when Glenmore qualified to play Tullaroan. Lining out at centre-back, he ended the game with a third championship winners' medal following the 1–14 to 2–06 victory.

On 15 October 1995, O'Connor was selected at full-back when he lined out in a sixth county final of his career. He claimed a fourth winners' medal after the 3–19 to 1–14 victory over Fenians. On 26 November 1995, O'Connor collected a second Leinster Club Championship medal after Glenmore's 2–13 to 2–10 defeat of Oulart-the Ballagh in the Leinster final.

O'Connor lined out in the seventh and final county final on 24 October 1999 when Glenmore faced Graigue-Ballycallan. Lining out at full-back, he claimed a fifth winners' medal after the 1–14 to 2–08 victory.

=== Kilkenny ===
==== Minor and under-21 ====
O'Connor first lined out for Kilkenny as a 16-year-old when he was selected for the minor team in advance of the 1981 Leinster Championship. He won his first Leinster Minor Championship medal, albeit as a non-playing substitute, on 12 July 1981 after Kilkenny's 3–10 to 3–09 defeat of Wexford in the final. On 6 September 1981, O'Connor was once again listed amongst the substitutes when Kilkenny faced Galway in the All-Ireland final. He remained on the bench for the entire game but collected a winners' medal after the 1–20 to 3–09 victory.

O'Connor was once again eligible for the Kilkenny minor team that contested the 1982 Leinster Championship. He claimed a second Leinster Minor Championship medal as a non-playing substitute on 25 July 1982 after Kilkenny's 3–16 to 3–04 victory over Offaly in the final.

O'Connor was added to the Kilkenny under-21 team prior to the start of the 1984 Leinster Championship. He claimed his first Leinster Under-21 Championship medal on 15 July 1984 after lining out at full-back in Kilkenny's 0–18 to 1–10 defeat of Wexford in the final. On 26 August 1984, O'Connor was once again selected at full-back when Kilkenny qualified to play Tipperary in the All-Ireland final. He ended the game with a winners' medal following a 1–12 to 0–11 victory.

On 21 July 1985, O'Connor claimed a second successive Leinster Under-21 Championship medal after once again lining out at full-back in the 4–18 to 1–04 defeat of Wexford in the final. For the second successive year, Kilkenny faced Tipperary in the All-Ireland final on 25 August 1985, with O'Connor again playing at full-back. He ended the game, which was his last in the under-21 grade, on the losing side after a 1–10 to 2–06 defeat.

==== Senior ====
Glenmore's run of success to the 1991 All-Ireland Club Championship title saw O'Connor being drafted onto the Kilkenny senior team for the latter stages of the 19901-91 National League. He made his first appearance for the team on 30 June 1991 when he was introduced as a 15th-minute substitute for Liam Walsh in a 2–09 to 0–13 defeat of Wexford in the Leinster Championship. On 21 July 1991, O'Connor broke onto the starting fifteen when he was selected at right corner-back for Kilkenny's Leinster final-meeting with Dublin. He ended the game with his first winners' medal after the 1–13 to 1–11 victory. On 1 September 1991, O'Connor was switched to left wing-back for the All-Ireland final against Tipperary. He ended the game on the losing side after the 1–15 to 0–16 defeat.

On 5 July 1992, O'Connor won a second successive Leinster Championship medal after lining out at right corner-back in the 3–16 to 2–09 victory over Wexford in the final. He retained his position on the starting fifteen for the All-Ireland final against Cork on 6 September 1992. O'Connor ended the game with his first All-Ireland medal after the 3–10 to 1–12 victory.

In October 1992, O'Connor was nominated by his club for the captaincy of the Kilkenny senior team. He later claimed a third successive Leinster Championship medal on 18 July 1993 after captaining the team from right corner-back to a 2–12 to 0–11 defeat of Wexford in the final replay. On 5 September 1993, O'Connor captained Kilkenny to a third successive All-Ireland final appearance with Galway providing the opposition. He ended the game with a second All-Ireland winners' medal after the 2–17 to 1–15 victory. In accepting the Liam MacCarthy Cup, O'Connor caused something of a minor controversy when he used his speech to suggest that it was time for the GAA to formally fund a holiday for the All-Ireland finalists. He ended the year by winning his only All-Star Award.

On 7 May 1995, O'Connor won a National Hurling League medal when he lined out at right corner-back in Kilkenny's 2–12 to 0–09 defeat of Clare in the final. He was again at right corner-back when Kilkenny suffered a 2–16 to 2–05 defeat by Offaly in the Leinster final on 16 July 1995.

On 13 July 1997, O'Connor made his fifth and final Leinster final appearance when he lined out at right corner-back against Wexford on 13 July 1997. He ended the game on the losing side after being substituted in the 2–14 to 1–11 defeat. O'Connor retired from inter-county hurling at the end of the season.

== Career statistics ==
Team	Year	Leinster		All-Ireland		Total	
Team	Year	Division	Apps	Score	Apps	Score	Apps
Kilkenny	1991	2	0–00	2	0–00	4	0–00
Kilkenny	1992	2	0–00	2	0–00	4	0–00
Kilkenny	1993	4	0–00	2	0–00	6	0–00
Kilkenny	1994	2	0–00	0	0–00	2	0–00
Kilkenny	1995	3	0–00	0	0–00	3	0–00
Kilkenny	1996	0	0–00	0	0–00	0	0–00
Kilkenny	1997	2	0–00	2	0–00	4	0–00
Total		15	0-00	8	0-00	23	0-00

== Honours ==
Glenmore

- All-Ireland Senior Club Hurling Championship (1): 1991
- Leinster Senior Club Hurling Championship (2): 1990, 1995
- Kilkenny Senior Hurling Championship (5): 1987, 1990, 1992, 1995, 1999

Kilkenny

- All-Ireland Senior Hurling Championship (2): 1992, 1993 (c)
- Leinster Senior Hurling Championship (3): 1991, 1992, 1993 (c)
- National Hurling League (1): 1994–95
- All-Ireland Under-21 Hurling Championship (1): 1984
- Leinster Under-21 Hurling Championship (2): 1984, 1985
- All-Ireland Minor Hurling Championship (1): 1981
- Leinster Minor Hurling Championship (2): 1981, 1982

Sporting positions
Preceded by Liam Fennelly	Kilkenny Senior Hurling Captain; 1993	Succeeded by Michael Walsh
Achievements
Preceded by Liam Fennelly	All-Ireland Senior Hurling Final winning captain 1993	Succeeded by Martin Hanamy
