= Ray Heffernan (hurler) =

Irish hurler

Personal information
- Born: 26 January 1963 (age 63) Glenmore, County Kilkenny, Ireland
- Occupation: Insurance broker
- Height: 5 ft 11 in (180 cm)

Sport
- Sport: Hurling
- Position: Midfield
Club
- Years: Club
- 1980-2001: Glenmore
Club titles
- Kilkenny titles: 5
- Leinster titles: 2
- All-Ireland Titles: 1
College
- Years: College
- 1980-1983: Waterford Regional Technical College
College titles
- Fitzgibbon titles: 0
Inter-county
- Years: County
- 1984-1993: Kilkenny
Inter-county titles
- Leinster titles: 3
- All-Irelands: 1
- NHL: 0
- All Stars: 0

Raymond Heffernan (born 26 January 1963) is an Irish former hurler. At club level he played with Glenmore and was also a member of the Kilkenny senior hurling team. He usually lined out at midfield or as a forward.

== Career ==
Heffernan first came to prominence at juvenile and underage levels with the Glenmore club before eventually joining the club's top adult team. After junior and intermediate successes, he went on to win a total of five County Senior Championship titles and was team captain for the All-Ireland Club Championship success in 1991. Heffernan first appeared on the inter-county scene as part of the Kilkenny team that won the All-Ireland Minor Championship title in 1981, before later winning an All-Ireland Under-21 Championship title in 1984. His underage and club successes saw him drafted onto the Kilkenny senior hurling team alongside his brother Christy in 1984. Over the course of the following decade Heffernan made a number of Walsh Cup, National League and championship appearances but failed to break onto the starting fifteen on a regular basis. He was a non-playing substitute for two All-Ireland finals and, after defeat by Tipperary in 1991, claimed a winners' medal against Galway in 1993. Heffernan's other honours include three Leinster Championship medals.

== Honours ==
=== Team ===
Glenmore

- All-Ireland Senior Club Hurling Championship: 1991 (c)
- Leinster Senior Club Hurling Championship: 1990 (c), 1995
- Kilkenny Senior Hurling Championship: 1987, 1990 (c), 1992 (c), 1995, 1999
- Kilkenny Intermediate Hurling Championship: 1981
- Kilkenny Junior Hurling Championship: 1980

Kilkenny

- All-Ireland Senior Hurling Championship: 1993
- Leinster Senior Hurling Championship: 1986, 1991, 1993
- All-Ireland Under-21 Hurling Championship: 1984
- Leinster Under-21 Hurling Championship: 1982, 1984
- All-Ireland Minor Hurling Championship: 1981
- Leinster Minor Hurling Championship: 1981

=== Individual ===
Awards

- Kilkenny Sports Star Hurling Award: 1981

Achievements
Preceded by Wattie Phelan	All-Ireland Senior Club Hurling Final winning captain 1991	Succeeded by Aidan Staunton
