= Michael Phelan (hurler) =

Irish hurler (born 1967)

Personal information
- Native name: Mícheál Ó Faoláin (Irish)
- Nickname: Titch
- Born: 3 August 1967 (age 59) Glenmore, County Kilkenny, Ireland
- Occupation: Foundry worker
- Height: 6 ft 1 in (185 cm)

Sport
- Sport: Hurling
- Position: Midfield
Club
- Years: Club
- Glenmore
Club titles
- Kilkenny titles: 5
- Leinster titles: 2
- All-Ireland Titles: 1
Inter-county
- Years: County
- 1989-1998: Kilkenny
Inter-county titles
- Leinster titles: 4
- All-Irelands: 2
- NHL: 2
- All Stars: 1

Michael Phelan (born 3 August 1967) is an Irish hurling manager and former player. At club level he played with Glenmore and was also a member of the Kilkenny senior hurling team. He usually lined out at midfield.

== Career ==
Phelan first came to prominence at juvenile and underage levels with the Glenmore club before eventually joining the club's top adult team. He won a total of five County Senior Championship titles with the club and was at centre-forward for the All-Ireland Club Championship success in 1991. Phelan first appeared on the inter-county scene with the Kilkenny under-21 team that suffered All-Ireland final defeat by Cork in 1988. This success saw him drafted on to the Kilkenny senior hurling team in 1989. Phelan would go on to line out in three consecutive All-Ireland finals at senior level and, after defeat by Tipperary in 1991, claimed consecutive winners' medals against Cork in 1992 and Galway in 1993. His other honours include two National League titles, four Leinster Championship medals and an All-Star Award. Phelan's last major game with Kilkenny was the 1998 All-Ireland final defeat by Offaly when he was an unused substitute. He later became involved in team management and took charge of the Wicklow senior hurling team for the 2009 season.

== Honours ==
=== Team ===
Glenmore

- All-Ireland Senior Club Hurling Championship: 1991
- Leinster Senior Club Hurling Championship: 1990, 1995
- Kilkenny Senior Hurling Championship: 1987, 1990, 1992, 1995, 1999

Kilkenny

- All-Ireland Senior Hurling Championship: 1992, 1993
- Leinster Senior Hurling Championship: 1991, 1992, 1993, 1998, 1999
- National Hurling League: 1989-90, 1994-95
- Leinster Under-21 Hurling Championship: 1988

Leinster

- Railway Cup: 1993

=== Individual ===
Awards

- All-Star Award: 1992

Sporting positions
Preceded by Bill Hennessy	Kilkenny Senior Hurling Captain; 1996	Succeeded by D. J. Carey
Preceded by John Mitchell	Wicklow Senior Hurling Manager; 2009	Succeeded by Casey O'Brien
