= 1992 All-Ireland Senior Hurling Championship final =

1992 All-Ireland Senior Hurling Final
- Event: 1992 All-Ireland Senior Hurling Championship
Kilkenny	Cork
3-10	1-12
- Date: 6 September 1992
- Venue: Croke Park, Dublin
- Man of the Match: Pat O'Neill
- Referee: Dickie Murphy (Wexford)
- Attendance: 64,534
- Weather: Rain

The 1992 All-Ireland Senior Hurling Championship Final was the 105th All-Ireland Final and the culmination of the 1992 All-Ireland Senior Hurling Championship, an inter-county hurling tournament for the top teams in Ireland. The match was held at Croke Park, Dublin, on 6 September 1992, between Kilkenny and Cork. The Munster champions lost to their Leinster opponents on a score line of 3–10 to 1–12.

== Match details ==
6 September 1992
15:30
Final

Kilkenny	3-10 - 1-12	Cork
D. J. Carey (1-4), L. McCarthy (1-1), J. Power (1-0), M. Phelan (0-2), L. Fennelly (0-1), C. Heffernan (0-1), A. Ronan (0-1).	Report	G. Manley (1-0), T. O'Sullivan (0-3), S. McCarthy (0-3), T. McCarthy (0-2), K. Hennessy (0-1), T. Mulcahy (0-1), B. Corcoran (0-1), C. Casey (0-1).

Croke Park, Dublin
Attendance: 64,534
Referee: Dickie Murphy

Kilkenny	Cork

KILKENNY:
1	Michael Walsh
2	Eddie O'Connor
3	Pat Dwyer
4	Liam Simpson
5	Liam Walsh
6	Pat O'Neill
7	Willie O'Connor
8	Michael Phelan
9	Bill Hennessy
10	Liam McCarthy
11	John Power
12	D. J. Carey
13	Eamon Morrissey
14	Liam Fennelly (c)
15	Jamesie Brennan
Substitutes:
	C. Heffernan for J. Brennan
	A. Ronan for E. Morrissey
Manager:
Ollie Walsh

CORK:
1	Ger Cunningham
2	Sean O'Gorman
3	Denis Mulcahy
4	Brian Corcoran
5	Cathal Casey
6	Jim Cashman
7	Denis Walsh
8	Pat Buckley
9	Sean McCarthy
10	Teddy McCarthy
11	Tomas Mulcahy
12	Tony O'Sullivan
13	Ger FitzGerald (c)
14	John Fitzgibbon
15	K. Hennessy
Substitutes:
	P. Hartnett for D. Walsh
	G. Manley for G. FitzGerald
	M. Foley for P. Buckley
Manager:
Fr. Michael O'Brien

Man of the Match:
Pat O'Neill
