= 1998 Kilkenny Senior Hurling Championship =

Annual hurling competition season

- Dates: 26 September 1998 – 1 November 1998
- Teams: 12
- Sponsor: St. Canice's Credit Union
- Champions: Graigue-Ballycallan (1st title); Damien Cleere (captain)
- Runners-up: Fenians; Matty Walsh (captain)
- Relegated: Dunnamaggin

Tournament statistics
- Matches played: 14
- Goals scored: 25 (1.79 per match)
- Points scored: 285 (20.36 per match)
- Top scorer(s): Brendan Ryan (1-19)

The 1998 Kilkenny Senior Hurling Championship was the 104th staging of the Kilkenny Senior Hurling Championship since its establishment by the Kilkenny County Board. The championship began on 26 September 1998 and ended on 1 November 1998.

Dunnamaggin were the defending champions, however, they were defeated by O'Loughlin Gaels in the first round. They were eventually relegated after losing to St. Martin's in a play-off.

On 1 November 1998, Graigue-Ballycallan won the title after a 1–14 to 0–12 defeat of Fenians in the final at Nowlan Park. It was their first ever championship title.

Brendan Ryan from the Fenians club was the championship's top scorer with 1–19.

== Team changes ==
=== To Championship ===
Promoted from the Kilkenny Intermediate Hurling Championship

- Ballyhale Shamrocks

=== From Championship ===
Relegated to the Kilkenny Intermediate Hurling Championship

- Mooncoin

== Results ==
=== First round ===
26 September 1998 First round	James Stephens	1-14 - 1-07	Young Irelands	Nowlan Park, Kilkenny
	B McEvoy 0-7, K Grogan 1-0, L Smith 0-2, L O'Connor 0-2, P Barry 0-1, B Smith 0-1, N Brennan 0-1.		C Carter 1-3, T Drennan 0-1, DJ Carey 0-1, J Fitzgerald 0-1, O Carter 0-1.

26 September 1998 First round	Tullaroan	0-13 - 0-09	Erin's Own	Páirc Lachtáin, Freshford
	J Coogan 0-5, J Norton 0-2, B Lee 0-2, D Gaffney 0-1, T Fitzgerald 0-1, J Walton 0-1, A O'Dea 0-1.		B Young 0-3, M Owens 0-2, D Buggy 0-1, J Buggy 0-1, V Smith 0-1, P Healy 0-1.

27 September 1998 First round	Ballyhale Shamrocks	2-11 - 1-09	St. Martin's	Nowlan Park, Kilkenny
	J Shefflin 1-2, H Shefflin 0-5, L Grant 1-0, P Phelan 0-2, B Aylward 0-1, P Farrell 0-1.		N Moloney 1-1, D Lawlor 0-4, P Brennan 0-3, T Cody 0-1.

27 September 1998 First round	O'Loughlin Gaels	1-08 - 0-09	Dunnamaggin	John Locke Park, Callan
	A Geoghegan 0-6, J Daly 1-0, S Dowling 0-1, J Comerford 0-1.		B O'Shea 0-7, M O'Neill 0-1, M Moran 0-1.

=== Relegation play-off ===
25 October 1998 Final	St. Martin's	1-10 - 0-06	Dunnamaggin	St. John's Park, Kilkenny
	N Moloney 1-3, A Lawlor 0-2, J Dooley 0-2, J Maher 0-2, D Lawlor 0-1.		B O'Shea 0-4, M O'Neill 0-1, S Ryan 0-1.

=== Quarter-finals ===
4 October 1998 Quarter-final	Tullaroan	1-11 - 0-12	Dicksboro	Nowlan Park, Kilkenny
	J Coogan 0-5, B Teehan 1-1, J Norton 0-2, L O'Dea 0-1, J Walton 0-1, T Fitzgerald 0-1.		G Henderson 0-5, J Treacy 0-2, D O'Neill 0-2, S Kennedy 0-1, J O'Gorman 0-1, T Bawle 0-1.

4 October 1998 Quarter-final	Graigue-Ballycallan	2-14 - 0-13	James Stephens	Nowlan Park, Kilkenny
	A Ronan 1-4, J Young 1-3, J Hoyne 0-2, J Young 0-2, T Dermody 0-2, M Hoyne 0-1.		B McEvoy 0-7, L O'Connor 0-2, P Larkin 0-1, P Barry 0-1, L Smith 0-1, K Grogan 0-1.

4 October 1998 Quarter-final	Glenmore	0-09 - 0-09	O'Loughlin Gaels	Páirc na Seamróga, Ballyhale
	D Mullally 0-3, R Heffernan 0-2, P Mullally 0-1, R Mullally 0-1, J Phelan 0-1, S Dollard 0-1.		A Geoghegan 0-5, A Comerford 0-2, J Comerford 0-1, J O'Keeffe 0-1.

4 October 1998 Quarter-final	Fenians	2-18 - 2-09	Ballyhale Shamrocks	Nowlan Park, Kilkenny
	Brendan Ryan 1-5, M Walsh 1-3, K Power 0-5, B Purcell 0-2, S Grehan 0-1, Brian Ryan 0-1, PJ Delaney 0-1.		H SHefflin 1-6, C Harrington 1-0, B Aylward 0-1, L Grant 0-1, T Sheehan 0-1.

11 October 1998 Quarter-final replay	Glenmore	2-11 - 0-06	O'Loughlin Gaels	Nowlan Park, Kilkenny
	M Mullally 1-3, J Murphy 1-2, S Vereker 0-2, J Phelan 0-2, R Heffernan 0-1, D Phelan 0-1.		A Geoghegan 0-3, A Comerford 0-2, J Daly 0-1.

=== Semi-finals ===
18 October 1998 Semi-final	Fenians	1-08 - 0-11	Glenmore	Nowlan Park, Kilkenny
	B Ryan 0-4, M Walsh 1-0, B Purcell 0-2, K Power 0-1, S Grehan 0-1.		R Heffernan 0-6, P Mullally 0-1, S Vereker 0-1, J Murphy 0-1, M Mullally 0-1, J Phelan 0-1.

18 October 1998 Semi-final	Graigue-Ballycallan	4-12 - 2-08	Tullaroan	Nowlan Park, Kilkenny
	D Byrne 2-2, D Cleere 0-7, J Hoyne 2-0, A Ronan 0-1, T Dermody 0-1, M Hoyne 0-1.		J Coogan 0-5, T Fitzgerald 1-1, D Gaffney 1-1, B Teehan 0-1.

24 October 1998 Semi-final replay	Fenians	0-08 - 1-04	Glenmore	Nowlan Park, Kilkenny
	K Power 0-2, Brendan Ryan 0-2, PJ Ryan 0-1, D Garrett 0-1, S Grehan 0-1, B Purcell 0-1.		R Heffernan 1-3, C Heffernan 0-1.	Referee: P Neary (James Stephens)

=== Final ===
1 November 1998 Final	Graigue-Ballycallan	1-14 - 0-12	Fenians	Nowlan Park, Kilkenny
	D Cleere 0-8, A Ronan 1-0, Joey Young 0-2, D Byrne 0-2, M Hoyne 0-1, T Dermody 0-1.		Brendan Ryan 0-8, PJ Delaney 0-2, Brian Ryan 0-1, M Walsh 0-1.	Referee: P Dunphy

== Championship statistics ==
=== Top scorers ===
Overall

Rank	Player	County	Tally	Total	Matches	Average
1	Brendan Ryan	Fenians	1-19	22	4	5.50
2	Ray Heffernan	Glenmore	1-12	15	4	3.75
2	Damien Cleere	Graigue-Ballycallan	0-15	15	3	5.00
2	Jimmy Coogan	Tullaroan	0-15	15	3	5.00
3	Henry Shefflin	Ballyhale Shamrocks	1-11	14	2	7.00
3	Brian McEvoy	James Stehens	0-14	14	2	7.00
3	Alan Geoghegan	O'Loughlin Gaels	0-14	14	3	4.66
4	Adrian Ronan	Graigue-Ballycallan	2-05	11	3	3.66
4	Brian O'Shea	Dunnamaggin	0-11	11	2	5.50
5	Niall Moloney	St. Martin's	2-04	10	2	5.00
5	Denis Byrne	Graigue-Ballycallan	2-04	10	3	3.33

Single game

Rank	Player	County	Tally	Total	Opposition
1	Henry Shefflin	Ballyhale Shamrocks	1-06	9	Fenians
2	Denis Byrne	Graigue-Ballycallan	2-02	8	Tullaroan
2	Brendan Ryan	Fenians	1-05	8	Ballyhale Shamrocks
2	Brendan Ryan	Fenians	0-08	8	Graigue-Ballycallan
2	Damien Cleere	Graigue-Ballycallan	0-08	8	Fenians
3	Adrian Ronan	Graigue-Ballycallan	1-04	7	James Stehens
3	Brian McEvoy	James Stehens	0-07	7	Young Irelands
3	Brian O'Shea	Dunnamaggin	0-07	7	O'Loughlin Gaels
3	Brian McEvoy	James Stehens	0-07	7	Graigue-Ballycallan
3	Damien Cleere	Graigue-Ballycallan	0-07	7	Tullaroan
