= 1990–91 All-Ireland Senior Club Hurling Championship =

All-Ireland Senior Club Hurling Championship 1990–91
Championship Details
- Dates: 30 September 1990 – 17 March 1991
- Teams: 28

All Ireland Champions
- Winners: Glenmore (1st win)
- Captain: Ray Heffernan
- Manager: Georgie Leahy

All Ireland Runners-up
- Runners-up: Patrickswell
- Captain: David Punch
- Manager: Phil Bennis

Provincial Champions
- Munster: Patrickswell
- Leinster: Glenmore
- Ulster: Dunloy
- Connacht: Kiltormer

Championship Statistics
- Matches Played: 28
- Total Goals: 89 (3.17 per game)
- Total Points: 569 (20.32 per game)
- Top Scorer: Ray Heffernan (0–37)

The 1990–91 All-Ireland Senior Club Hurling Championship was the 21st staging of the All-Ireland Senior Club Hurling Championship, the Gaelic Athletic Association's premier inter-county club hurling tournament. The championship ran from 30 September 1990 to 17 March 1991.

Ballyhale Shamrocks were the defending champions, however, they failed to qualify after being beaten by Fenians in the 1990 Kilkenny SHC quarter-finals. Na Piarsaigh of Cork and Holycross–Ballycahil of Tipperary made their championship debuts.

The All-Ireland final was played at Croke Park in Dublin on 17 March 1991, between Glenmore of Kilkenny and Patrickswell of Limerick, in what was a first championship meeting between the teams. Glenmore won the match by 1–13 to 0–12 to claim a first title.

Glenmore's Ray Heffernan was the championship's top scorer with 0–37.

== Connacht Senior Club Hurling Championship ==
=== Connacht first round ===
| 30 September 1990 First round | Gortletteragh | 6–09 – 3–08 | Tourlestrane | Mohill Grounds |
| | P Logan 2–6, S Duignan 2–0, N Ward 1–1, T Howard 1–0, G Dorrigan 0–1, T Ward 0–1. | | W Kavanagh 2–1, M Walsh 0–4, P Durkin 1–0, J Quinn 0–2, N McVeigh 0–1. | Referee: S Nolan (Ballygar) |

=== Connacht second round ===
| 7 October 1990 Second round | Gortletteragh | 2–05 – 3–13 | Tooreen | Mohill Grounds |
| | | | J Cunnane 2–1, D Greally 1–4, J Henry 0–6, M Trench 0–2. | Referee: M Donnellan (Sligo) |

=== Connacht semi-final ===
| 21 October 1990 Semi-final | Oran | 2–12 – 1–12 | Tooreen | Athleague Sportsfield |
| | C Kelly 0–5, B McDermott 1–1, H Crowley 1–1, W Depinna 0–2, M Lenin 0–1, S Mitchell 0–1, S Fallon 0–1. | | J Cunnane 1–1, D Greally 0–4, J Henry 0–3, S Caulfield 0–1, R Delaney 0–1, D Greally 0–1, M Trench 0–1. | Referee: M Carroll |

=== Connacht final ===
| 25 November 1990 Final | Kiltormer | 5–11 – 0–06 | Oran | Athleague Sportsfield |
| | D Curley 1–6, S Kelly 2–0, M Staunton 1–2, C Hayes 1–1, L Larkin 0–2. | | C Kelly 0–4, W Depinna 0–1, S Mitchell 0–1. | Referee: J Martin (Mayo) |

== Leinster Senior Club Hurling Championship ==
=== Leinster first round ===
| 7 October 1990 First round | Wolfe Tones (Longford) | 2–05 – 2–13 | Coill Dubh | Leo Casey Park |
| | J Cullen 1–1, R McLoughlin 1–0, E Brady 0–2, D Doherty 0–1, J Lynn 0–1. | | PJ Curtin 0–8, J Fox 1–1, D Hanniffy 1–0, J Byrne 0–2, M Casey 0–1, C Byrne 0–1. | Referee: T Dowd (Westmeath) |

| 7 October 1990 First round | Camross | 2–15 – 1–06 | St Patrick's | O'Moore Park |
| | PJ Cuddy 1–2, J Dollard 1–1, F Lawlor 0–5, M Collier 0–3, F Dowling 0–2, S Cuddy 0–1, P Dooley 0–1. | | D Berry 1–2, T Byrne 0–2, G Johnson 0–2. | Referee: P Cassin (Carlow) |

| 7 October 1990 First round | Castletown Geoghegan | 2–14 – 0–06 | Wolfe Tones GAA (Louth) | Páirc Mhic Eochagain |
| | M Bolger 0–4, G Jackson 0–4, P O'Brien 1–0, F Keegan 1–0, E Clarke 0–3, F McLavin 0–2, J Moloney 0–1. | | O Kelly 0–6. |

| 13 October 1990 First round | Naomh Eoin | 1–12 – 0–12 | Kilmessan | Dr Cullen Park |
| | M Slye 0–6, P Quirke 1–1, N Minchin 0–2, J Byrne 0–2, J O'Neill 0–1. | | E O'Neill 0–5, B O'Reilly 0–3, J Smyth 0–1, J Maguire 0–1, M Maguire 0–1, P Donnelly 0–1. |

=== Leinster quarter-finals ===
| 20 October 1990 Quarter-final | Naomh Eoin | 1–11 – 3–11 | O'Tooles | Dr Cullen Park |
| | M Slye 0–6, N Minchin 1–0, P Quirke 0–2, C Jordan 0–1, J Byrne 0–1, Red M Nolan 0–1. | | D O'Brien 1–2, P Carton 0–5, P O'Dwyer 1–1, M Morris 1–0, P Smith 0–2, D Hernon 0–1. | Referee: D Murphy (Wexford) |

| 21 October 1990 Quarter-final | Camross | 2–09 – 2–08 | Rathnure | Kelly Daly Park |
| | F Lawlor 0–5, PJ Cuddy 1–0, J Lalor 1–0, J Dollard 0–2, M Collier 0–1, F Scully 0–1. | | J Houlihan 1–4, A Codd 1–0, M Hearne 0–2, J Murphy 0–1, M Quigley 0–1. |

| 21 October 1990 Quarter-final | Castletown Geoghegan | 1–05 – 1–17 | St Rynagh's | Páirc Mhic Eochagain |
| | P O'Brien 1–2, G Whelan 0–1, G Jackson 0–1, E Clarke 0–1. | | M Conneely 1–9, E Mulhaire 0–3, M Duignan 0–2, D Fogarty 0–1, R Mannion 0–1, C Egan 0–1, F Dolan 0–1. | Referee: A Mac Suibhne (Dublin) |

| 21 October 1990 Quarter-final | Coill Dubh | 0–07 – 3–17 | Glenmore | Naas Grounds |
| | PJ Curtin 0–4, J Byrne 0–2, R Byrne 0–1. | | C Heffernan 2–2, F Phelan 1–3, R Heffernan 0–6, M Phelan 0–3, J Heffernan 0–2, J Flynn 0–1. |

=== Leinster semi-finals ===
| 10 November 1990 Quarter-final | Camross | 3–08 – 2–06 | O'Tooles | Dr Cullen Park |
| | M Cuddy 2–1, F Lawlor 1–2, J Dollard 0–3, J Lalor 0–1, PJ Cuddy 0–1. | | P O'Dwyer 1–2, P Carton 1–0, P Kavanagh 0–2, N Howard 0–2. | Referee: R Murphy (Wexford) |

| 10 November 1990 Semi-final | Glenmore | 0–14 – 2–05 | St Rynagh's | Dr Cullen Park |
| | R Heffernan 0–8, P Barron 0–2, M Phelan 0–2, J Heffernan 0–2. | | M Conneely 1–1, F Dolan 1–0, M Duignan 0–1, D Fogarty 0–1, E Mulhaire 0–1, M Hanamy 0–1. | Referee: P Delaney (Laois) |

=== Leinster final ===
| 25 November 1990 Final | Glenmore | 0–15 – 1–09 | Camross | Geraldine Park |
| | R Heffernan 0–7, M Phelan 0–4, C Heffernan 0–2, J Flynn 0–1, P Barron 0–1. | | F Lawlor 0–4, M Cuddy 1–0, M Collier 0–1, F Dowling 0–1, PJ Cuddy 0–1, P Dooley 0–1, J Dollard 0–1. | Referee: P Horan (Offaly) |

== Munster Senior Club Hurling Championship ==
=== Munster quarter-finals ===
| 21 October 1990 Quarter-final | Éire Óg, Ennis | 2–16 – 1–14 | Roanmore | Cusack Park |
| | D Coote 2–5, P Barry 0–2, M Nugent 0–2, S Heaslip 0–2, J Russell 0–2, J Corbett 0–1, C Lynch 0–1, T McEnery 0–1. | | K Delahunty 0–5, E Nolan 1–1, N Crowley 0–3, T Shanahan 0–3, P Tobin 0–1, Maurice Wadding 0–1. | Referee: G Ryan (Tipperary) |

| 21 October 1990 Quarter-final | St Brendan's, Ardfert | 0–10 – 0–10 | Holycross-Ballycahill | Páirc Naomh Breandán |
| | P Healy 0–7, J Crowley 0–1, G Pearse 0–1, JJ Sullivan 0–1. | | S Dwan 0–4, T Lanigan 0–3, R Stakelum 0–1, P Lanigan 0–1, D Carr 0–1. | Referee: M Quinn (Clare) |

| 27 October 1990 Quarter-final replay | Holycross-Ballycahill | 2–10 – 2–09 | St Brendan's, Ardfert | Semple Stadium |
| | D Ryan 1–1, T Lanigan 0–4, P Slattery 1–0, S Dwan 0–2, D Carr 0–1, P Maher 0–1, PJ Lanigan 0–1. | | M Crowley 1–5, G Hassey 1–1, P Cleary 0–3. | Referee: W Horgan (Cork) |

=== Munster semi-finals ===
| 11 November 1990 Semi-final | Éire Óg, Ennis | 2–05 – 0–09 | Na Piarsaigh | Cusack Park |
| | P Barry 1–0, G Barry 1–0, D Coote 0–2, S Heaslip 0–2, G Mannion 0–1. | | Mark Mullins 0–6, T O'Sullivan 0–2, J O'Connor 0–1. | Referee: T Lyons (Limerick) |

| 11 November 1990 Semi-final | Holycross-Ballycahill | 0–09 – 0–13 | Patrickswell | Semple Stadium |
| | T Lanigan 0–5, D Carr 0–2, C Carroll 0–2. | | G Kirby 0–5, A Carmody 0–2, S Kirby 0–2, C Carey 0–1, N Carey 0–1, S Foley 0–1, D O'Grady 0–1. | Referee: J Moore (Waterford) |

=== Munster final ===
| 25 November 1990 Final | Éire Óg, Ennis | 0–06 – 0–08 | Patrickswell | Cusack Park |
| | D Coote 0–4, S Heaslip 0–1, T Corbett 0–1. | | G Kirby 0–6, L Enright 0–1, D O'Grady 0–1. | Referee: G Ryan (Tipperary) |

== Ulster Senior Club Hurling Championship ==
=== Ulster semi-finals ===
| 30 September 1990 Semi-final | Lavey | 0–06 – 2–06 | Ballygalget | Lavey Grounds |
| | H Downey 0–4, S Downey 0–2. | | Brendan Coulter 1–2, Paddy Savage 1–0, Philbin Savage 0–2, Barry Coulter 0–1, P Coulter 0–1. | Referee: B Reid (Antrim) |

| 21 October 1990 Semi-final | Keady Lámh Dhearg | 1–02 – 5–20 | Dunloy | Keady Grounds |
| | E McKee 1–0, J McCormack 0–2. | | J Elliott 2–7, S McMullan 1–6, A Elliott 1–1, T McGrath 1–1, S McMullan 0–2, A McGilligan 0–1, Gerry O'Kane 0–1, Gary O'Kane 0–1. |

=== Ulster final ===
| 11 November 1990 Final | Dunloy | 0–17 – 2–04 | Ballygalget | Casement Park |
| | J Elliott 0-8, J McGrath 0-4, A Elliott 0-2, T McGrath 0-1, M Maguire 0-1, G O'Kane 0-1. | | P Savage 1-0, Brendan Coulter 1-0, Barry Coulter 0-3, B Gallagher 0-1. |

== All-Ireland Senior Club Hurling Championship ==
=== All-Ireland quarter-final ===
| 9 December 1990 Quarter-final | Kiltormer | 1–12 – 2–11 | St Gabriel's | Kenny Park |
| | M Staunton 1–1, D Curley 0–3, D Cox 0–2, C Hayes 0–2, S Kelly 0–2, Tom Kilkenny 0–1, T Larkin 0–1. | | T Conneely 1–2, M Costelloe 1–1, P Hoctor 0–3, M Connolly 0–3, J Campbell 0–1, M Cunningham 0–1. | Referee: J Henry (Westmeath) |

=== All-Ireland semi-finals ===
| 24 February 1991 Semi-final | Patrickswell | 8–12 – 3–06 | St Gabriel's | Gaelic Grounds |
| | G Kirby 3–4, S Foley 2–1, N Carey 1–1, S Carey 1–1, G Hayes 1–0, C Carey 0–2, P Foley 0–1, S Kirby 0–1, L Enright 0–1. | | M Connolly 2–6, M Headd 1–0. |

| 24 February 1991 Semi-final | Glenmore | 1–18 – 1–10 | Dunloy | Nowlan Park |
| | R Heffernan 0–11, J Flynn 1–0, P Barron 0–2, J Heffernan 0–2, D Heffernan 0–2, M Phelan 0–1. | | T McGrath 1–1, G O'Kane 0–3, A Elliott 0–2, J Elliott 0–2, S Boyle 0–1, S McMullan 0–1. | Referee: W Horgan (Cork) |

=== All-Ireland final ===
| 17 March 1991 Final | Glenmore | 1–13 – 0–12 | Patrickswell | Croke Park |
| | R Heffernan 0–5, C Heffernan 1–1, J Heffernan 0–2, P Barron 0–2, D Mullally 0–2, S Dollard 0–1. | | C Carey 0–5, G Kirby 0–4, Pa Foley 0–1, L Enright 0–1, A Carmody 0–1. | Attendance: 8,316; Referee: W Barrett (Tipperary) |

== Championship statistics ==
=== Top scorers ===
| Rank | Player | Club | Tally | Total | Matches | Average |
|---|---|---|---|---|---|---|
| 1 | Ray Heffernan | Glenmore | 0-37 | 37 | 5 | 7.40 |
| 2 | Gary Kirby | Patrickswell | 3-19 | 28 | 4 | 7.00 |
| 3 | Joe Elliott | Dunloy | 2-17 | 23 | 3 | 7.66 |
| 4 | Fintan Lawlor | Camross | 1-16 | 19 | 4 | 4.50 |
| 5 | Declan Coote | Éire Óg, Ennis | 2-11 | 17 | 3 | 5.66 |
| 6 | Micheál Conneely | St Rynagh's | 2-10 | 16 | 2 | 8.00 |
| 7 | Michael Connolly | St Gabriel's | 2-09 | 15 | 2 | 7.50 |
| 8 | Christy Heffernan | Glenmore | 3-05 | 14 | 5 | 2.80 |
