= 1991 All-Ireland Senior Club Hurling Championship final =

1991 All-Ireland Senior Club Hurling Championship Final
- Event: 1990–91 All-Ireland Senior Club Hurling Championship
Glenmore	Patrickswell
1-13	0-12
- Date: 17 March 1991
- Venue: Croke Park, Dublin
- Referee: Willie Barrett (Tipperary)
- Attendance: 8,316

The 1991 All-Ireland Senior Club Hurling Championship final was a hurling match played at Croke Park on 17 March 1991 to determine the winners of the 1990–91 All-Ireland Senior Club Hurling Championship, the 21st season of the All-Ireland Senior Club Hurling Championship, a tournament organised by the Gaelic Athletic Association for the champion clubs of the four provinces of Ireland. The final was contested by Glenmore of Kilkenny and Patrickswell of Limerick, with Glenmore winning by 1-13 to 0-12.

The All-Ireland final was a unique occasion as it was the first ever championship meeting between Glenmore and Patrickswell. It remains their only championship meeting at this level. Both sides were hoping to make history by winning their first All-Ireland title.

Patrickswell were the second successive Limerick representatives to contest an All-Ireland decider after Ballybrown in 1990. Glenmore, who just a decade earlier were a junior club, won the title courtesy of a kicked goal from Christy Heffernan in the 33rd minute.

Glenmore's victory secured their first All-Ireland title. They became the 14th club to win the All-Ireland title, while they were the fourth Kilkenny representatives to claim the ultimate prize.

== Match ==
=== Details ===
17 March 1991

Glenmore	1-13 - 0-12	Patrickswell
R Heffernan 0-5 (4f and 1 '65'), C Heffernan 1-1, D Mullally 0-2, P Barron 0-2, J Heffernan 0-2, S Dollard 0-1.		C Carey 0-5, G Kirby 0-4 (2f), L Enright 0-1, A Carmody 0-1, Pa Foley 0-1 (1f).

Croke Park, Dublin
Attendance: 8,316
Referee: W Barrett (Tipperary)

Glenmore	Patrickswell
