= 1996 All-Ireland Senior Club Hurling Championship final =

1996 All-Ireland Senior Club Hurling Championship Final
- Event: 1995–96 All-Ireland Senior Club Hurling Championship
Sixmilebridge	Dunloy
5-10	2-6
- Date: 17 March 1996
- Venue: Croke Park, Dublin
- Referee: Dickie Murphy (Wexford)
- Attendance: 21,986

The 1996 All-Ireland Senior Club Hurling Championship final was a hurling match played at Croke Park on 17 March 1996 to determine the winners of the 1995–96 All-Ireland Senior Club Hurling Championship, the 26th season of the All-Ireland Senior Club Hurling Championship, a tournament organised by the Gaelic Athletic Association for the champion clubs of the four provinces of Ireland. The final was contested by Sixmilebridge of Clare and Dunloy of Antrim, with Sixmilebridge winning by 5–10 to 2–6.

The All-Ireland final was a unique occasion as it was the first ever championship meeting between Sixmilebridge and Dunloy. It remains their only championship meeting in the All-Ireland series. Both sides were hoping to make history by winning their first All-Ireland title.

Sixmilebridge struck for their first goal inside a minute when a long delivery was flicked by Gerry McInerney into the path of Danny Chaplin who pulled first time and netted from 15 metres. Dunloy recovered well and by the 16th minute Tony McGrath had sent them into a 0–4 to 1–0 lead. McInerney equalised for Sixmilebridge form a free and Danny Chaplin sent brother David in for the second goal after 21 minutes. Four minutes later Danny Chaplin created the third goal, this time for McInerney. David Chaplin and McInerney added points to open up an eight-point gap. David Chaplin was the hero scoring 2-1 while the ageless Gerry McInerney also played a vital role hitting 1–4.

Sixmilebridge's victory secured their first All-Ireland title. They became the 18th club to win the All-Ireland title, while they were the first Clare representatives to claim the ultimate prize.

Dunloy's All-Ireland defeat was their second successive defeat in a final after losing to Birr in 1995.

== Match ==
=== Details ===
17 March 1996

Sixmilebridge	5-10 - 2-6	Dunloy
David Chaplin 2-1, G McInerney 1-3 (2f), D McInerney 1-0, Danny Chaplin 1-0, N Gilligan 0-3, J Chaplin 0-2 (1f), N Earley 0-1 ('65').		T McGrath 1-1, A Elliott 1-1, S McMullan 0-2 ('65s'), Gregory O'Kane 0-1, F McMullan 0-1.

Croke Park, Dublin
Attendance: 21,986
Referee: D Murphy (Wexford)

Sixmilebridge	Dunloy
