= 1999 Kilkenny Senior Hurling Championship =

Annual hurling competition season

- Dates: 21 August 1999 – 24 October 1999
- Teams: 12
- Sponsor: St. Canice's Credit Union
- Champions: Glenmore (1st title); Denis Mullally (captain)
- Runners-up: Graigue-Ballycallan; Adrian Ronan (captain)
- Relegated: St. Martin's

Tournament statistics
- Matches played: 14
- Goals scored: 42 (3 per match)
- Points scored: 342 (24.43 per match)
- Top scorer(s): Henry Shefflin (1-24)

The 1999 Kilkenny Senior Hurling Championship was the 105th staging of the Kilkenny Senior Hurling Championship since its establishment by the Kilkenny County Board. The draw for the opening round fixtures took place on 12 July 1999. The championship began on 21 August 1999 and ended on 24 October 1999.

Graigue-Ballycallan were the defending champions.

On 24 October 1999, Glenmore won the title after a 1–14 to 2–08 defeat of Graigue-Ballycallan in the final at Nowlan Park. It was their fifth championship title overall and their first title in four championship seasons. It remains their last championship triumph.

== Team changes ==
=== To Championship ===
Promoted from the Kilkenny Intermediate Hurling Championship

- Clara

=== From Championship ===
Relegated to the Kilkenny Intermediate Hurling Championship

- Dunnamaggin

== Results ==
=== First round ===
21 August 1999 First round	O'Loughlin Gaels	1-15 - 2-18	Dicksboro	Nowlan Park, Kilkenny
	A Geoghegan 0-7, J Comerford 1-1, D Ronan 0-2, A Comerford 0-2, S Dowling 0-2, M Comerford 0-1.		G Henderson 0-7, S Morrissey 1-1, N Lacey 1-0, S Kennedy 0-2, D Carroll 0-2, M Dowling 0-2, D O'Neill 0-1.

21 August 1999 First round	Ballyhale Shamarocks	2-15 - 2-13	St. Martin's	Nowlan Park, Kilkenny
	H Shefflin 0-7, B Aylward 1-2, L Grant 1-0, T Shefflin 0-2, C Harrington 0-2, A Cummins 0-1, N O'Keeffe 0-1.		D Lawlor 1-8, N Moloney 1-2, D Comerford 0-2, P Brennan 0-1.

22 August 1999 First round	Tullaroan	3-12 - 2-06	Clara	John Locke Park, Callan
	J Coogan 3-5, J Walton 0-3, B Hennessy 0-1, D Gaffney 0-1, L Keoghan 0-1, B Teehan 0-1.		A Prendergast 1-3, P Langton 1-0, J Casey 0-1, TJ Fitzgerald 0-1, R Shortall 0-1.

22 August 1999 First round	Fenians	1-17 - 2-11	James Stephens	Páirc Lachtáin, Freshford
	B Purcell 1-1, K Power 0-4, PJ Delaney 0-3, B Ryan 0-3, P Quinlan 0-2, J Ryan 0-1, S Grehan 0-1, D Garrett 0-1, P Delaney 0-1.		F Cantwell 1-1, R Manogue 0-4, L O'Connor 1-0, B McEvoy 0-3, P Larkin 0-2, M Phelan 0-1.

26 September 1999 First round replay	O'Loughlin Gaels	3-12 - 1-14	Dicksboro	Nowlan Park, Kilkenny
	T Doyle 2-0, J Comerford 1-2, A Comerford 0-4, A Geoghegan 0-4, D Ronan 0-1, M Comerford 0-1.		G Henderson 0-7, S Morrissey 0-5, T Bawle 1-1, S Kennedy 0-1.

=== Relegation play-offs ===
3 October 1999 Semi-final	Dicksboro	2-12 - 1-11	St. Martin's	St. Patrick's Park, Ballyragget
	S Morrissey 2-0, G Henderson 0-5, M Dowling 0-2, S Kennedy 0-2, D Carroll 0-1, J Treacy 0-1, T O'Gorman 0-1.		D Lawlor 0-6, A Lawlor 1-1, J Dooley 0-1, D Comerford 0-1, P Maher 0-1, J Maher 0-1.

17 October 1999 Final	Clara	2-17 - 1-11	St, Martin's	St. John's Park, Kilkenny
	R Shortall 1-4, P Fitzgerald 0-4, A Prendergast 1-0, R Moore 0-3, B Phelan 0-2, J Casey 0-2, B Barcoe 0-1, J Fitzgerald 0-1.		E Morrissey 1-2, J Dooley 0-4, D Lawlor 0-3, J Maher 0-1, D Comerford 0-1.

=== Quarter-finals ===
26 September 1999 Quarter-final	Graigue-Ballycallan	1-11 - 0-13	Fenians	Páirc Lachtáin, Freshford
	D Cleere 1-3, D Byrne 0-3, D Hoyne 0-2, J Young 0-1, M Hoyne 0-1, A Ronan 0-1.		K Power 0-8, P Delaney 0-2, W Purcell 0-1, J Ryan 0-1, D Garrett 0-1.

26 September 1999 Quarter-final	Glenmore	2-14 - 0-09	Tullaroan	Nowlan Park, Kilkenny
	PJ O'Connor 2-0, D Mullally 0-6, P Fitzgerald 0-3, R Mullally 0-2, M Phelan 0-2, M Murphy 0-1.		J Coogan 0-5, D Teehan 0-2, M Maher 0-1, P Doherty 0-1.

26 September 1999 Quarter-final	Erin's Own	0-15 - 1-13	Ballyhale Shamrocks	Canon Kearns Park, Castlecomer
	J Brennan 0-6, B Young 0-4, M Coogan 0-3, D Buggy 0-2.		H Shefflin 1-9, P Shefflin 0-1, C Harrington 0-1, N O'Keeffe 0-1, T Shefflin 0-1.

3 October 1999 Quarter-final	Young Irelands	4-11 - 1-08	O'Loughlin Gaels	Thomastown Sportsfield, Thomastown
	J Carey 2-0, C Carter 1-1, D Carroll 1-0, DJ Carey 0-3, P O'Neill 0-3, K Phelan 0-2, A O'Neill 0-2.		A Geoghegan 0-6, T Doyle 1-0, D Ronan 0-1, M Comerford 0-1.

=== Semi-finals ===
10 October 1999 Semi-final	Glenmore	4-11 - 0-12	Ballyhale Shamrocks	Nowlan Park, Kilkenny
	D Mullally 1-5, M Murphy 1-0, J Phelan 1-0, R Mullally 1-0, P Fitzgerald 0-3, P Mullally 0-2, S Vereker 0-1.		H Shefflin 0-8, A Cummins 0-2, N O'Keeffe 0-1, B Aylward 0-1.

10 October 1999 Semi-final	Graigue-Ballycallan	0-13 - 1-06	Young Irelands	Nowlan Park, Kilkenny
	D Cleere 0-5, E O'Dwyer 0-2, D Hoyne 0-2, J Ryall 0-2, A Ronan 0-2.		DJ Carey 1-1, C Carter 0-2, P O'Neill 0-1, J Carey 0-1, A O'Neill 0-1.

=== Final ===
24 October 1999 Final	Glenmore	1-14 - 2-08	Graigue-Ballycallan	Nowlan Park, Kilkenny
	M Murphy 1-1, J Phelan 0-4, S Dollard 0-3, R Heffernan 0-3, D Mullally 0-2, R Mullally 0-1.		D Byrne 0-6, A Ronan 1-0, T Darmody 1-0, J Young 0-2.	Referee: J Direen (O'Loughlin Gaels)

== Championship statistics ==
=== Top scorers ===
Overall

Rank	Player	County	Tally	Total	Matches	Average
1	Henry Shefflin	Ballyhale Shamrocks	1-24	27	3	9.00
2	Dermot Lawlor	St. Martin's	1-17	20	3	6.66
3	Jimmy Coogan	Tullaroan	3-10	19	2	9.50
3	Ger Henderson	Dicksboro	0-19	19	3	6.33
4	Alan Geoghegan	O'Loughlin Gaels	0-17	17	3	5.66
5	Denis Mullally	Glenmore	1-13	16	3	5.33

Single game

Rank	Player	County	Tally	Total	Opposition
1	Jimmy Coogan	Tullaroan	3-05	14	Clara
2	Henry Shefflin	Ballyhale Shamrocks	1-09	12	Erin's Own
3	Dermot Lawlor	Erin's Own	1-08	11	Ballyhale Shamrocks
4	Denis Mullally	Glenmore	1-05	8	Ballyhale Shamrocks
4	Henry Shefflin	Ballyhale Shamrocks	0-08	8	Glenmore
4	Kevin Power	Fenians	0-08	8	Graigue-Ballycallan
5	Robert Shortall	Clara	1-04	7	St. Martin's
5	Alan Geoghegan	O'Loughlin Gaels	0-07	7	Dicksboro
5	Ger Henderson	Dicksboro	0-07	7	O'Loughlin Gaels
5	Henry Shefflin	Ballyhale Shamrocks	0-07	7	St. Martin's
5	Ger Henderson	Dicksboro	0-07	7	O'Loughlin Gaels
