= Donal Kealy =

Irish hurler

Personal information
- Native name: Dónall Ó Caollaí (Irish)
- Born: 1965 (age 60–61) Roscrea, County Tipperary, Ireland
- Occupation: Fitter

Sport
- Sport: Hurling
- Position: Centre-back
Clubs
- Years: Club
- Roscrea; St Gabriel's
Club titles
- Tipperary titles: 0
Inter-county
Years	County	Apps (scores)
1985-1986	Tipperary	4 (0-00)
Inter-county titles
- Munster titles: 0
- All-Irelands: 0
- NHL: 0
- All Stars: 0

Donal Kealy (born 1965) is an Irish former hurler. At club level, he played with Roscrea and St Gabriel's and at inter-county level he was a member of the Tipperary senior hurling team.

== Career ==
Kealy attended Roscrea Vocational School and played hurling at all levels during his time there. He progressed to the school's senior team and was in goal when Roscrea beat Banagher Vocational School by 3-05 to 0-05 to win the All-Ireland VS SAHC title in 1980.

At club level, Kealy played with Roscrea and was part of the club's under-21 team that won back-to-back Tipperary U21AHC titles in 1983 and 1984. He later lined out at centre-back when Roscrea were beaten by Kilruane MacDonaghs in the 1985 Tipperary SHC final. Kealy later played with the St Gabriel's club in London.

Kealy first appeared on the inter-county scene with Tipperary during a two-year tenure with the minor team. He won consecutive Munster MHC medals in 1982 and 1983. He was centre-back when Tipperary beat Galway by 2-07 to 0-04 in the 1982 All-Ireland minor final. Kealy later spent three years with the under-21 team and captained the team to the Munster U21HC title in 1984, before retaining the title the following year. He also won an All-Ireland U21HC medal after a 1-10 to 2-06 defeat of Kilkenny in 1985.

Kealy was drafted onto the senior team while he was still a member of the under-21 team. He made a number of appearances during his two years with the team in 1985 and 1986.

== Honours ==
Roscrea Vocational School

- All-Ireland Vocational Schools' Senior Hurling Championship: 1980

Roscrea

- Tipperary Under-21 A Hurling Championship: 1983, 1984

Tipperary

- All-Ireland Under-21 Hurling Championship: 1985
- Munster Under-21 Hurling Championship: 1984 (c), 1985
- All-Ireland Minor Hurling Championship: 1982
- Munster Minor Hurling Championship: 1982, 1983

Sporting positions
Preceded by	Tipperary under-21 hurling team captain 1983	Succeeded by Michael Scully
