= 1985 Kilkenny Senior Hurling Championship =

Annual hurling competition season

- Champions: Ballyhale Shamrocks (6th title); Frank Holohan (captain)
- Runners-up: Glenmore

The 1985 Kilkenny Senior Hurling Championship was the 91st staging of the Kilkenny Senior Hurling Championship since its establishment by the Kilkenny County Board.

St. Martin's were the defending champions.

Ballyhale Shamrocks won the championship after a 4–18 to 3–13 defeat of Glenmore in the final. It was their sixth championship title overall and their first title in two championship seasons.
