= 1995 Kilkenny Senior Hurling Championship =

Annual hurling competition season

- Dates: 13 August 1995 – 15 October 1995
- Teams: 12
- Sponsor: St. Canice's Credit Union
- Champions: Glenmore (4th title); Willie O'Connor (captain); Tom Ryan (manager)
- Runners-up: Fenians
- Relegated: Ballyhale Shamrocks

Tournament statistics
- Matches played: 13
- Goals scored: 50 (3.85 per match)
- Points scored: 308 (23.69 per match)
- Top scorer(s): Billy Purcell (3-13); Brendan Ryan (2-16)

The 1995 Kilkenny Senior Hurling Championship was the 101st staging of the Kilkenny Senior Hurling Championship since its establishment by the Kilkenny County Board. The championship began on 13 August 1995 and ended on 13 October 1995.

Tullaroan were the defending champions, however, they were defeated by Fenians in the first round.

On 15 October 1995, Glenmore won the title after a 3–19 to 1–14 defeat of Fenians in the final at Nowlan Park. It was their fourth championship title overall and their first title in three championship seasons.

== Team changes ==
=== To Championship ===
Promoted from the Kilkenny Intermediate Hurling Championship

- Mooncoin

=== From Championship ===
Relegated to the Kilkenny Intermediate Hurling Championship

- Mullinavat

== Results ==
=== First round ===
| 13 August 1995 First round | Fenians | 3-12 - 2-13 | Tullaroan | Páirc Lachtain, Freshford |
| | B Purcell 2-2, Brendan Ryan 0-5, E Behan 1-1, J Brennan 0-2, PJ Ryan 0-2. | | J Coogan 1-5, D Gaffney 0-4, L Keoghan 1-0, S Teehan 0-2, V Norton 0-1, J Walton 0-1. | Referee: E Mahon (Cloneen) |

| 13 August 1995 First round | Dicksboro | 2-15 - 1-06 | Ballyhale Shamrocks | John Locke Park, Callan |
| | S Moore 1-2, T Bawle 1-1, J Treacy 0-4, S Morrissey 0-2, D O'Neill 0-2, S Kennedy 0-1, I Henderson 0-1, P Henderson 0-1, S Prendergast 0-1. | | C Harrington 1-3, G Fennelly 0-2, L Fennelly 0-1. |

| 27 August 1995 First round | John Locke's | 1-12 - 0-14 | Mooncoin | Hugginstown Sportsfield, Hugginstown |
| | D Roche 1-2, PJ Cody 0-5, S Donovan 0-2, D Bergin 0-2, J Lynch 0-1. | | T Murphy 0-6, M Walsh 0-6, T Dunphy 0-1, E Mackey 0-1. | Referee: P Neary (James Stephens) |

| 3 September 1995 First round | James Stephens | 4-16 - 2-10 | St. Martin's | St. Patrick's Park, Ballyragget |
| | R Manogue 2-8, B Leahy 2-2, B McEvoy 0-3, N Brennan 0-1, L Smith 0-1, M Walsh 0-1. | | N Moloney 1-1, D Comerford 1-1, D Lawlor 0-3, J Dooley 0-3, E Morrissey 0-1, J Brennan 0-1. |

=== Relegation play-offs ===
| 23 September 1995 Semi-final | Mooncoin | 0-11 - 0-09 | St. Martin's | John Locke Park, Callan |
| | M Walsh 0-3, E Mackey 0-3, T Murphy 0-3, E Crowley 0-1, G Kirwan 0-1. | | D Lawlor 0-6, J Dooley 0-2, E Morrissey 0-1. | Referee: P Butler |

| 30 September 1995 Semi-final | Tullaroan | 3-10 - 2-08 | Ballyhale Shamrocks | John Locke Park, Callan |

| 30 September 1995 Final | St. Martin's | 2-17 - 1-10 | Ballyhale Shamrocks | John Locke Park, Callan |

=== Quarter-finals ===
| 16 September 1995 Quarter-final | Graigue-Ballycallan | 3-08 - 2-10 | James Stephens | Nowlan Park, Kilkenny |
| | D Cleere 2-1, A Ronan 0-4, D Byrne 1-0, J Young 0-2, J Maher 0-1. | | R Minogue 0-6, B Leahy 1-2, B McEvoy 1-0, N Brennan 0-2. | Referee: E Mahon (Cloneen) |

| 16 September 1995 Quarter-final | Fenians | 4-21 - 4-10 | Young Irelands | Nowlan Park, Kilkenny |
| | Brendan Ryan 1-4, E Behan 1-4, B Purcell 1-4, PJ Delaney 1-2, PJ Ryan 0-3, J Brennan 0-2, M Walsh 0-1, Brian Ryan 0-1. | | DJ Carey 3-1, A O'Neill 1-0, C Carter 0-3, P O'Neill 0-3, J McDermott 0-2, J Fitzgerald 0-1. | Referee: D O'Sullivan (John Lockes) |

| 16 September 1995 Quarter-final | Glenmore | 2-10 - 1-09 | Dicksboro | Páirc na Seamróg, Ballyhale |
| | R Heffernan 0-5, J Phelan 1-1, S Dollard 1-0, D Mullally 0-2, J Walsh 0-1, M Phelan 0-1. | | D O'Neill 0-5, S Prendergast 1-1, S Morrissey 0-1, S Moore 0-1, J Treacy 0-1. | Referee: D Cody (Graignamanagh) |

| 17 September 1995 Quarter-final | Erin's Own | 3-12 - 0-11 | John Locke's | Nowlan Park, Kilkenny |
| | J Brennan 1-4, B Young 1-3, J Slevin 1-2, M O'Neill 0-2, J Buggy 0-1. | | PJ Cody 0-9, J Power 0-1, A O'Sullivan 0-1. | Referee: J Guinan (Lisdowney) |

=== Semi-finals ===
| 1 October 1995 Semi-final | Fenians | 1-13 - 1-13 | Graigue-Ballycallan | Nowlan Park, Kilkenny |
| | S Grehan 1-0, J Brennan 0-3, E Behan 0-2, PJ Delaney 0-2, A McEvoy 0-1, Brian Ryan 0-1, M Phelan 0-1, Brendan Ryan 0-1, B Purcell 0-1, PJ Ryan 0-1. | | D Cleere 0-6, A Ronan 0-4, T Dermody 1-0, T McCluskey 0-2, G Ronan 0-1. | Referee: E McMahon (Cloneen) |

| 1 October 1995 Semi-final | Glenmore | 4-15 - 1-07 | Erin's Own | Nowlan Park, Kilkenny |
| | R Heffernan 0-8, D Mullally 1-1, J Phelan 1-1, P Barron 1-0, J Murphy 1-0, S Dollard 0-2, D Heffernan 0-1, M Murphy 0-1, M Phelan 0-1. | | J Brennan 1-3, D Buggy 0-2, M Owens 0-1, B Young 0-1. | Referee: J Guinan (Lisdowney) |

| 8 October 1995 Semi-final replay | Fenians | 1-14 - 0-07 | Graigue-Ballycallan | Nowlan Park, Kilkenny |
| | Brendan Ryan 1-3, E Behan 0-3, PJ Ryan 0-3, PJ Delaney 0-2, B Purcell 0-2, Brian Ryan 0-1. | | A Ronan 0-4, D Cleere 0-2, T McCluskey 0-1. | Referee: E McMahon (Cloneen) |

=== Final ===
| 15 October 1995 Final | Glenmore | 3-19 - 1-14 | Fenians | Nowlan Park, Kilkenny |
| | R Heffernan 0-7, J Phelan 2-0, M Phelan 1-3, D Mullally 0-5, PJ O'Connor 0-1, D Heffernan 0-1, S Dollard 0-1, C Heffernan 0-1. | | B Purcell 0-4, M Phelan 1-0, S Grehan 0-3, Brendan Ryan 0-3, E Behan 0-2, Briain Ryan 0-1, PJ Ryan 0-1. | Referee: TP Hayes (Graigue-Ballycallan) |

== Championship statistics ==
=== Miscellaneous ===
- Graigue-Ballycallan qualified for the semi-final stages of the championship for the first time in 38 years.
