= Liam Walsh (hurler) =

Irish hurler

Personal information
- Native name: Liam Breathnach (Irish)
- Born: 25 June 1963 (age 63) Glenmore, County Kilkenny
- Occupation: Plasterer
- Height: 5 ft 10 in (178 cm)

Sport
- Sport: Hurling
- Position: Half-back
Club
- Years: Club
- Glenmore
Inter-county
- Years: County
- 1986–1991: Kilkenny
Inter-county titles
- Leinster titles: 4
- All-Irelands: 1

Liam Walsh (born 25 June 1963) is former Irish sportsperson. He played hurling with his local club Glenmore and with the Kilkenny senior inter-county team in the 1980s and 1990s. In 1992, he won an all-Ireland Senior Hurling Championship medal.

== Playing career ==
=== Club ===
Walsh played his club hurling with his local Glenmore club and he enjoyed much success. He won five senior county titles in 1987, 1990, 1992, 1995 and 1999. Walsh's second county title was subsequently converted into both Leinster and All-Ireland club titles.

=== Inter-county ===
Walsh first came to prominence on the inter-county scene as a member of the Kilkenny under-21 hurling team. At this level he won a Leinster title in 1984 before collecting an All-Ireland medal following a defeat of Tipperary. He later joined the Kilkenny senior team where he won his first senior Leinster title, however, his side were later defeated by Galway in the All-Ireland semi-final. In 1987 Walsh won a second provincial title. Kilkenny later reached the All-Ireland final, however, his side were defeated by Galway once again. In 1988 he was appointed captain of the senior team, however, Kilkenny's hurlers were facing a low period. It would be 1991 before Walsh won a third Leinster title and, once again, Kilkenny later qualified for the All-Ireland final. Once again, however, 'the Cats' faced defeat at the hands of Tipperary.

The following year Walsh won his fourth provincial medal and lined out in a third All-Ireland final. It was a case of third time lucky as Kilkenny defeated their biggest rivals Cork, giving Walsh an All-Ireland medal. He retired from inter-county hurling following this victory.

Preceded by Paddy Prendergast	Kilkenny Senior Hurling Captain; 1988	Succeeded by Kevin Fennelly
