= Willie O'Connor =

Irish hurler

Personal information
- Native name: Liam Ó Conchubhair (Irish)
- Born: 14 March 1967 (age 59) Glenmore, County Kilkenny, Ireland
- Occupation: Farmer
- Height: 5 ft 7 in (170 cm)

Sport
- Sport: Hurling
- Position: Left corner-back
Club
- Years: Club
- Glenmore
Club titles
- Kilkenny titles: 5
- Leinster titles: 1
- All-Ireland Titles: 1
Inter-county
Years	County	Apps (scores)
1988–2001	Kilkenny	33 (0-00)
Inter-county titles
- Leinster titles: 5
- All-Irelands: 3
- NHL: 2
- All Stars: 4

Willie O’Connor (born 14 March 1967) is an Irish retired hurler who played as a left corner-back for the Kilkenny senior team.

O'Connor made his first appearance for the team during the 1988–89 National League and was a regular member of the starting fifteen until his retirement prior to the 2001 championship. During that time he has won three All-Ireland winners' medals, five Leinster winners' medals, one National League winners' medal and four All-Star awards. In 2000 O'Connor captained the team to the All-Ireland title.

At club level O'Connor is a one-time All-Ireland medalist with Glenmore. In addition to this he has also won one Leinster winners' medal and five county championship winners' medals.

O'Connor's brother, Eddie, is also an All-Ireland-winning captain with Kilkenny.

== Playing career ==
=== Club ===
O'Connor played his club hurling with Glenmore and enjoyed much success as the club became a new force in hurling throughout the 1980s and 1990s.

In 1987 Glenmore reached the final of the county senior championship with Ballyhale Shamrocks providing the opposition. An exciting game developed over the hour, and a 4–10 to 3–9 victory gave O'Connor his first county winners' medal.

After surrendering their title in 1988 and losing the championship decider to Ballyhale Shamrocks the following year, O'Connor's side reached the final again in 1990. Glenmore faced Clara on that occasion, however, O'Connor's side had a comfortable 3–15 to 2–6 victory. The club subsequently represented Kilkenny in the provincial series of games and even reached the final. Camross provided the opposition, however, O'Connor collected a Leinster club winners' medal following a 0–15 to 1–9 victory. An All-Ireland final showdown with Patrickswell of Limerick. The game was an exciting one, however, Patrickswell only held the lead on one occasion when Leonard Enright opened the scoring. A 1–13 to 0–12 score line gave Glenmore the title and gave O'Connor an All-Ireland club winners' medal.

Glenmore lost their county, provincial and All-Ireland titles the following year, however, in 1992 O'Connor picked up a third county winners' medal following a 1–14 to 2–6 defeat of club kingpins Tullaroan.

Once again Glenmore failed to retain their title the following year. It was 1995 before O'Connor's side reached the county championship decider once again. Fenians provided the opposition in a high-scoring hour of hurling. Glenmore were never really troubled as a 3–19 to 1–14 score line gave O'Connor a fourth county championship title.

Many believed that this Glenmore team had reached the end of their life-cycle, however, in 1999 the club bounced back to reach the county final once again. Graigue-Ballycallan were the opponents and a close game developed. A 1–14 to 2–8 victory gave O'Connor a fifth and final county championship winners' medal.

=== Inter-county ===
O’Connor played with the Kilkenny minor and under-21 hurling teams throughout the 1980s, however, he enjoyed little success. He subsequently joined the county's senior team, making his debut against Waterford in a National Hurling League game in late 1988. O'Connor made his championship debut the following summer as Kilkenny reached the Leinster final. Offaly retained the provincial title for the second year in succession with a 3–15 to 4–9 victory.

O'Connor remained on the fringes of the team for the next few years as Kilkenny prepared for a return to the big time. He missed Kilkenny's Leinster final triumph in 1991, however, he was named in the starting fifteen for the subsequent All-Ireland final meeting with Tipperary, the first such clash in twenty years. The opening thirty-five minutes saw both sides trade score-for-score, however, a controversial 20-metre free, miss-hit by Michael Cleary, landed in the net and gave Tipp a lead which they never surrendered. The final score of 1–16 to 0–15 resulted in a loss for Kilkenny.

In 1992 Kilkenny bounced back from the All-Ireland defeat and O'Connor collected his first Leinster winners' medal following a comprehensive 3–16 to 2–9 defeat of Wexford. The subsequent All-Ireland final saw 'the Cats' take on Cork for the first time in nearly a decade. The game was well balanced for the first-half, however, D. J. Carey scored a goal four minutes before the break. This seemed to give Kilkenny the impetus to go on and win the game. Two more goals by John Power and Michael Phelan in the second-half secured a win for Kilkenny and a first All-Ireland winners' medal for O'Connor. He was later honoured with his first All-Star award

In 1993 O'Connor's brother Eddie was captain as Kilkenny remained on top of the hurling world. A defeat of Wexford gave O'Connor his second Leinster winners' medal while he later lined out in his second successive All-Ireland final, this time against Galway. The game was a close affair with the westerners going a point ahead coming into the last quarter; however, Kilkenny won the match by five points, giving O'Connor a second All-Ireland winners' medal.

Kilkenny failed in their bid to make in three-in-a-row the following year, however, in 1995 it looked as if Kilkenny's hurling fortunes were turning. At the start of the year O'Connor won his first National Hurling League title as Kilkenny defeated Clare. In spite of this victory 1995 proved to be an unhappy year as Kilkenny were trounced by Offaly in the Leinster final.

The next few years proved to be frustrating ones for O'Connor and for Kilkenny. It was 1998 before O'Connor added a third Leinster winners' medal to his collection as Offaly were accounted for in the provincial final. Kilkenny later cruised to an All-Ireland final appearance where Offaly provided the opposition once again. The defeated Leinster finalists had certainly learned from their mistakes with Joe Errity and Brian Whelahan scoring key goals. At the full-time whistle Offaly emerged as the winners by 2–16 to 1–13. It was the first time that a defeated team had won the All-Ireland title via the 'back-door' system.

In 1999 Brian Cody took over as manager, however, O'Connor remained a key member of the team. That year he won his fourth Leinster title as Offaly, the All-Ireland champions, fell heavily by 5–14 to 1–16 in the provincial final. The subsequent All-Ireland final saw Kilkenny take on Cork, their age-old rivals, for the first time since 1992. On that occasion O'Connor won his first All-Ireland medal, however, there was to be no success for him in 1999. A poor game on a wet day gave one of the youngest Cork teams ever the All-Ireland title on a score line of 0–13 to 0–12.

In 2000 O'Connor was appointed captain of the Kilkenny team. He subsequently guided his team to another Leinster crown, his fifth in all. Offaly were accounted for once again, however, on this occasion the score line was a more respectable 2–21 to 1–13 in favour of 'the Cats'. An appearance in his sixth All-Ireland soon followed for O'Connor as 'the Cats' lined out against Offaly for the second time that season. After just six minutes D. J. Carey scored the first of five goals as Kilkenny exposed the Offaly full-back line. Carey scored 2–4 that day and shared his second goal with a young Henry Shefflin. Further goals by Charlie Carter and Eddie Brennan saw Kilkenny win on a score line of 5–15 to 1–14 and allowed O'Connor capture his third All-Ireland medal. He also had the honour of lifting the Liam MacCarthy Cup on behalf of the team. He later collected his second All-Star award. In captaining Kilkenny to the All-Ireland title O'Connor became the second member of his family to do so. His brother Eddie was captain when Kilkenny won in 1993. It was the second time that two brothers had guided their county to championship honours as Liam and Ger Fennelly had both earlier guided Kilkenny to All-Ireland titles.

In 2001 O'Connor was almost thirty-four years-old, an age when most inter-county players would contemplate retirement. He played no part in Kilkenny's National League campaign, however, he intended returning in time for the championship. When Brian Cody announced his twenty nine-man panel prior to the opening of the summer campaign, O'Connor was not included. This effectively brought his inter-county career to an end.

=== Inter-provincial ===
O'Connor also had the honour of being called for duty on the Leinster team in the inter-provincial series of games. He first tasted success with his province in 1993 when he lined out in the inter-provincial final. A 1–15 to 2–6 defeat of Ulster gave O'Connor his first Railway Cup winners' medal.

After a few years being sidelined O'Connor was back on the team again in 1998, this time as captain. Once again Leinster reached the final where Connacht provided the opposition. The eastern province beat the western province by the narrowest of margins on a score line of 0–16 to 2–9. It was O'Connor's second Railway Cup winners' medal while he also had the honour of lifting the cup.

O'Connor was included on the team again in 2000, however, Leinster were beaten by Munster in the final on that occasion.

Throughout his inter-provincial career, O'Connor's commitment to the Leinster team and his ability to perform at the highest level further solidified his reputation as a notable figure in Irish hurling. His experiences in the Railway Cup series were not only about victories and defeats but also about the camaraderie, sportsmanship, and pride associated with representing one's province in this prestigious competition.

== Quotes ==
- "For the last six years this cup has wandered around and didn't know where twas going. Now it knows it's going home." – O'Connor's speech after accepting the Liam MacCarthy Cup in 2000. It was Kilkenny's first All-Ireland title since 1993 and brought an end to the so-called hurling revolution.

Sporting positions
Preceded by Denis Byrne	Kilkenny Senior Hurling Captain; 2000	Succeeded by Denis Byrne
Achievements
Preceded by Brian Lohan (Munster)	Railway Cup Hurling Final winning captain 1998	Succeeded by Brian Feeney (Galway)
Preceded by Mark Landers (Cork)	All-Ireland Senior Hurling Final winning captain 2000	Succeeded by Tommy Dunne (Tipperary)
