= 1992 Kilkenny Senior Hurling Championship =

Annual hurling competition season

- Dates: 4 July 1992 – 11 October 1992
- Teams: 12
- Sponsor: St. Canice's Credit Union
- Champions: Glenmore (3rd title); Ray Heffernan (captain)
- Runners-up: Tullaroan; Liam Keoghan (captain)
- Relegated: Graignamanagh

Tournament statistics
- Matches played: 15
- Goals scored: 43 (2.87 per match)
- Points scored: 330 (22 per match)
- Top scorer(s): Ray Heffernan (1-32)

The 1992 Kilkenny Senior Hurling Championship was the 98th staging of the Kilkenny Senior Hurling Championship since its establishment by the Kilkenny County Board since 1887. The championship began on 4 July 1992 and ended on 11 October 1992.

Ballyhale Shamrocks were the defending champions, however, they were beaten by Clara at the quarter-final stage. Graignamanagh were relegated from the championship after seven seasons.

On 11 October 1992, Glenmore won the championship after a 1–14 to 2–06 defeat of Tullaroan in the final. It was their third championship title overall and their first title in two championship seasons.

Glenmore's Ray Heffernan was the championship's top scorer with 1-32.

== New format ==
On 13 January 1992, a new championship format was approved by a considerable 40–11 vote at a special meeting of the Kilkenny County Board. The old group stage and knock-out format was abolished in favour of the creation of a new Kilkenny Senior Hurling League. comprising 12 teams divided into two groups of six, to be followed by a straight knock-out championship. Both competitions were linked as the top two teams from each league group received byes to the quarter-finals of the championship. The remaining eight teams entered the first round proper of the championship, with the four losing teams contesting the relegation play-offs.

== Team changes ==
=== To Championship ===
Promoted from the Kilkenny Intermediate Hurling Championship

- Dicksboro

=== From Championship ===
Relegated to the Kilkenny Intermediate Hurling Championship

- Mooncoin

== Results ==
=== First round ===
4 July 1992 First round	Glenmore	3-13 - 1-05	Graignamanagh	Páirc na Seamróga, Ballyhale
	J Flynn 2-1, R Heffernan 0-6, M Phelan 1-2, J Heffernan 0-4.		P Prendergast 1-1, J Carroll 0-2, K Corbett 0-2.

4 July 1992 First round	St. Martin's	2-11 - 1-14	Dicksboro	St. Patrick's Park, Ballyragget
	D Lawlor 2-7, E Morrissey 0-1, J Brennan 0-1, C Malone 0-1, S O'Neill 0-1.		L Kerwick 0-5, J Treacy 1-1, M Dowling 0-3, G Henderson 0-2, D O'Neill 0-2, M Kennedy 0-1.	Referee: P Butler (O'Loughlin Gaels)

4 July 1992 First round	Clara	5-09 - 1-14	James Stephens	Nowlan Park, Kilkenny
	B Barcoe 2-0, A Prendergast 1-4, R Shortall 1-2, L Ryan 1-0, J Casey 0-1, S Whearty 0-1, P Barcoe 0-1.		R Manogue 0-5, J O'Dwyer 1-1, L O'Connor 0-3, B McEvoy 0-2, D Cowhig 0-1, L Mullan 0-1, N Kelly 0-1.	Referee: D O'Sullivan (John Locke's)

5 July 1992 First round	Tullaroan	3-16 - 3-05	Erin's Own	Nowlan Park, Kilkenny
	R Walsh 1-3, S Teehan 1-1, D Gaffney 0-4, P Doheny 1-0, D Walsh 0-3, B Hennessy 0-3, J Walton 0-2.		B Young 1-3, J Buggy 1-0, F Slevin 1-0, E Holland 0-1, J Brennan 0-1.	Referee: D Cody (Graignamanagh)

15 August 1992 First round replay	St. Martin's	0-13 - 1-08	Dicksboro	St. Patrick's Park, Ballyragget
	D Lawlor 0-7, E Morrissey 0-5, M Moloney 0-1.		M Dowling 1-0, S Prendergast 0-3, J Kerwick 0-3, S Moore 0-1, N Lacey 0-1.	Referee: P Butler

=== Relegation play-offs ===
23 August 1992 Semi-final	James Stephens	3-17 - 2-06	Graignamanagh	Nowlan Park, Kilkenny
	R Manogue 0-10, B Walton 1-2, L O'Connor 1-2, L Mullins 1-0, B McEvoy 0-2, J Larkin 0-1.		M Dunne 1-0, F Doyle 1-0, J Maher 0-2, P Prendergast 0-2, K Corbett 0-1, A Foley 0-1.

19 September 1992 Semi-final	Dicksboro	0-15 - 1-09	Erin's Own	Polo Grounds, Jenkinstown
	T Bawle 0-8, G Henderson 0-3, J Treacy 0-2, M Dowling 0-1, S Moore 0-1.		J Buggy 0-4, F Slevin 1-0, J Brennan 0-3, E Holland 0-1, B Young 0-1.

25 September 1992 Final	Erin's Own	2-13 - 1-04	Graignamanagh	Bennettsbridge

=== Quarter-finals ===
15 August 1992 Quarter-final	Clara	1-14 - 0-11	Ballyhale Shamrocks	John Locke Park, Callan
	A Prendergast 0-6, P Barcoe 1-1, S Whearty 0-3, L Ryan 0-2, R Shortall 0-1, J Hanrahan 0-1.		G Fennelly 0-7, L Fennelly 0-2, J Lawlor 0-1, D Fennelly 0-1.

16 August 1992 Quarter-final	Glenmore	0-17 - 1-06	Mullinavat	Kilmacow
	R Heffernan 0-11, M Phelan 0-2, D Mullally 0-1, J Heffernan 0-1, J Flynn 0-1, C Heffernan 0-1.		M Dunphy 0-5, W Carroll 1-0, P Hoban 0-1.

16 August 1992 Quarter-final	Tullaroan	1-11 - 1-10	Graigue-Ballycallan	Nowlan Park, Kilkenny
	S Teehan 1-2, J Walton 0-4, B Hennessy 0-3, D Walsh 0-1, R Walsh 0-1.		J Ronan 0-7, J Teehan 1-1, B Ronan 0-1, A Ronan 0-1.	Referee: P Dunphy (Carrigeen)

19 September 1992 Quarter-final	Fenains	0-14 - 2-05	St. Martin's	St. Patrick's Park, Ballyragget
	B Purcell 0-4, S Grehan 0-2, B Ryan 0-2, G Henderson 0-2, B Fitzpatrick 0-2, M Walsh 0-1, PJ Delaney 0-1.		D Lawlor 1-4, D Comerford 1-0, J Dooley 0-1.	Referee: P Hayes (Graigue-Ballycallan)

=== Semi-finals ===
4 October 1992 Semi-final	Glenmore	1-14 - 0-12	Clara	Nowlan Park, Kilkenny
	R Heffernan 0-5, J Heffernan 1-0, M Phelan 0-3, D Mullally 0-3, D Heffernan 0-1, S Dollard 0-1, M "Foxy" Phelan 0-1.		A Prendergast 0-6, J Casey 0-3, L Ryan 0-2, S Whearty 0-1.	Referee: P Hayes (Graigue-Ballycallan)

4 October 1992 Semi-final	Tullaroan	3-11 - 1-13	Fenians	Nowlan Park, Kilkenny
	R Walsh 2-3, S Teehan 1-1, D Walsh 0-2, B Hennessy 0-2, D Gaffney 0-1, S Dunne 0-1, J Walton 0-1.		B Purcell 1-6, PJ Delaney 0-4, B Fitzpatrick 0-3.	Referee: P Long (Carrickshock)

=== Final ===
11 October 1992 Final	Glenmore	1-14 - 2-06	Tullaroan	Nowlan Park, Kilkenny
	R Heffernan 1-10, J Heffernan 0-1, M "Fox" Phelan 0-1, D Mullally 0-1, P Barron 0-1.		J Walton 0-4, S Teehan 1-0, P Doheny 1-0, D Walsh 0-1, B Hennessy 0-1.	Referee: P Long

== Championship statistics ==
=== Top scorers ===
Overall

Rank	Player	Club	Tally	Total	Matches	Average
1	Ray Heffernan	Glenmore	1-32	35	4	8.75
2	Dermot Lawler	St. Martin's	3-18	27	3	9.00
3	Anthony Prendergast	St. Martin's	1-16	19	3	6.66
4	Seán Teehan	Tullaroan	4-04	16	4	4.00
4	Richie Walsh	Tullaroan	3-07	16	3	5.33
5	Richie Manogue	James Stephens	0-15	15	2	7.50
