= 1987 Kilkenny Senior Hurling Championship =

Annual hurling competition season

- Champions: Glenmore (1st title); Christy Heffernan (captain)
- Runners-up: Ballyhale Shamrocks; Liam Fennelly (captain)

The 1987 Kilkenny Senior Hurling Championship was the 93rd staging of the Kilkenny Senior Hurling Championship since its establishment by the Kilkenny County Board.

Clara were the defending champions.

The final was played on 1 November 1987 at Nowlan Park in Kilkenny, between Glenmore and Ballyhale Shamocks, in what was their second meeting in the final overall and a first meeting in the final in two years. Glenmore won the match by 4-10 to 3-00 to claim their first ever championship title.

== Results ==
=== Final ===
1 November 1987 Final	Glenmore	4-10 - 3-09	Ballyhale Shamrocks	Nowlan Park
	R Heffernan 1-8, M O'Connor 1-1, C Heffernan 1-0, J Flynn 1-0, M Phelan 0-1.		L Fennelly 2-1, K Fennelly 1-4, B Fennelly 0-2, P Phelan 0-1, M Dempsey 0-1.	Referee: P Long (Carrickshock)
