= Alan Geoghegan =

Irish hurler

Personal information
- Native name: Ailéin Mag Eochagáin (Irish)
- Born: 14 March 1978 (age 48) Kilkenny, Ireland
- Height: 5 ft 10 in (178 cm)

Sport
- Sport: Hurling
- Position: Left wing-forward
Club
- Years: Club
- O'Loughlin Gaels
Club titles
- Kilkenny titles: 15
- Leinster titles: 13
- All-Ireland Titles: 11
Inter-county
Years	County	Apps (scores)
2001-2003	Kilkenny	1 (17-78)
Inter-county titles
- Leinster titles: 5
- All-Irelands: 0
- NHL: 3
- All Stars: 11

Alan John Geoghegan (born 14 March 1978) is an Irish hurler who played as a left wing-forward for the Kilkenny senior team.

Geoghegan joined the team during the 2001 National League and was a regular member of the team for just three seasons. During that time he won one Leinster winners' medal on the field of play.

At club level Geoghegan is a two-time Leinster medalist with O'Loughlin Gaels. In addition to this he has also won three county club championship medals.
