= 1990 Kilkenny Senior Hurling Championship =

Annual hurling competition season

- Dates: 28 April 1990 – 7 October 1990
- Teams: 12
- Champions: Glenmore (2nd title); Ray Heffernan (captain); Georgie Leahy (manager)
- Runners-up: Clara; Joe Casey (captain)
- Relegated: Conahy Shamrocks

Tournament statistics
- Matches played: 38
- Top scorer(s): Anthony Prendergast (5-48)

The 1990 Kilkenny Senior Hurling Championship was the 96th staging of the Kilkenny Senior Hurling Championship since its establishment by the Kilkenny County Board in 1887. The championship began on 28 April 1990 and ended on 7 October 1990.

Ballyhale Shamrocks were the defending champions, however, they were defeated by Fenians at the quarter-final stage.

On 15 September 1990, Conahy Shamrocks were relegated from the championship following 4–10 to 1–09 defeat by Graigue-Ballycallan.

On 7 October 1990, Glenmore won the championship after a 3–15 to 2–06 defeat of Clara in the final. It was their second championship title overall and their first title in three championship seasons.

Clara's Anthony Prendergast was the championship's top scorer with 5-48.

== Results ==
=== Group stage ===
==== Group 1 table ====
Team	Matches				Score			Pts
Team	Pld	W	D	L	For	Against	Diff	Pts
Glenmore	5	3	1	1	9-49	8-45	+7	7
Clara	5	3	1	1	14-47	4-59	+18	7
Fenians	5	2	1	2	7-59	11-46	+1	5
Graignamanagh	5	2	0	3	6-50	10-45	-7	4
St. Martin's	5	2	0	3	6-62	6-53	+9	4
Graigue-Ballycallan	5	1	1	3	6-40	9-69	-38	3

==== Group 1 results ====
29 April 1990	Glenmore	4-16 - 1-05	Graigue-Ballycallan	Hugginstown Sportsfield, Carrickshock
	M Phelan 2-7, R Heffernan 1-7, C Heffernan 1-0, J Heffernan 0-2.		A Ronan 1-1, M Murphy 0-1, T Comerford 0-1, L Comerford 0-1, P Dalton 0-1.	Referee: P Long (Carrickshock)

29 April 1990	Fenians	2-14 - 2-13	St. Martin's	St. Patrick's Park, Ballyragget
	B Fitzpatrick 2-2, W Purcell 0-5, J Brennan 0-4, P McCormack 0-2, D Dooley 0-1.		D Lawlor 0-5, J Moran 1-1, L Dowling 1-0, E Morrissey 0-3, J Brennan 0-2, D Dooley 0-1, D Coonan 0-1.

29 April 1990	Graignamanagh	1-07 - 3-09	Clara	Thoamstown Sportsfield, Thomastown
	J Byrne 0-6, A Foley 1-0, J Meaney 0-1.		K Ryan 1-2, S Whearty 1-1, L Byrne 1-0, L Ryan 0-3, J Casey 0-1, J Nolan 0-1, A Prendergast 0-1.

19 May 1990	Graignamanagh	0-12 - 0-11	St. Martin's	Nowlan Park, Kilkenny
	J Byrne 0-9, A Foley 0-2, J Carroll 0-1.		D Lawlor 0-6, T Morrissey 0-3, P Kehoe 0-1, D Coonan 0-1.

20 May 1990	Glenmore	2-13 - 2-10	Clara	Thomastown Sportsfield, Thomastown
	R Heffernan 0-11, M Phelan 1-1, C Heffernan 1-0, J Heffernan 0-1.		A Prendergast 1-3, K Ryan 1-2, S Whearty 0-2, J Casey 0-1, J Nolan 0-1, L Byrne 0-1.

20 May 1990	Fenians	1-12 - 2-11	Graigue-Ballycallan	Nowlan Park, Kilkenny
	B Purcell 1-8, J Power 0-1, J Brennan 0-1, G Henderson 0-1, M Phelan 0-1.		J Maher 2-2, M Murphy 0-4, T Comerford 0-2, J Kenny 0-2, J Ronan 0-1.

26 May 1990	St. Martin's	1-13 - 0-05	Graigue-Ballycallan	St. Patrick's Park, Ballyragget
	D Lawlor 1-7, E Morrissey 0-3, J Brennan 0-3.		J Ronan 0-2, L Comerford 0-1, J Maher 0-1, P Dalton 0-1.

27 May 1990	Glenmore	2-09 - 0-08	Graignamanagh	Thomastown Sportsfield, Thomastown
	C Heffernan 1-1, R Heffernan 0-4, M "Foxy" Phelan 1-0, M Phelan 0-2, B Doherty 0-1, J Heffernan 0-1.		J Byrne 0-4, M Dunne 0-3, K Corbett 0-1.

27 May 1990	Clara	4-06 - 0-15	Fenians	St. Patrick's Park, Ballyragget
	K Ryan 2-0, A Prendergast 0-5, L Byrne 1-0, P Campion 1-0, S Whearty 0-1.		W Purcell 0-5, B Fitzpatrick 0-3, B Ryan 0-3, J Brennan 0-3, M Phelan 0-1.

23 June 1990	Clara	1-12 - 1-12	Graigue-Ballycallan	Nowlan Park, Kilkenny
	A Prendergast 0-6, E Mulrooney 1-1, L Ryan 0-3, J Casey 0-1, S Whearty 0-1.		A Ronan 0-7, P Dalton 1-1, J Ronan 0-3, L Comerford 0-1.

24 June 1990	Fenians	3-08 - 2-06	Graignamanagh	Nowlan Park, Kilkenny
	B Purcell 1-2, B Behan 1-1, B Fitzpatrick 1-0, M Phelan 0-2, J Brennan 0-2, M Walsh 0-1.		K Cornett 1-0, P Prendergast 1-0, A Foley 0-2, J Byrne 0-2, P Ryan 0-1, M Dunne 0-1.

24 June 1990	St. Martin's	3-12 - 0-11	Glenmore	Nowlan Park, Kilkenny
	E Morrissey 1-4, D Lawlor 0-5, J Moran 2-0, J Morrissey 0-2, D Coonan 0-1.		R Heffernan 0-4, J Flynn 0-2, M Phelan 0-2, W O'Connor 0-2, D Heffernan 0-1.

21 July 1990	Clara	4-10 - 0-12	St. Martin's	Nowlan Park, Kilkenny
	A Prendergast 1-5, J casey 1-2, P Campion 1-1, S Whearty 1-1, K Ryan 0-1.		D Lawlor 0-5, J Brennan 0-3, E Morrissey 0-2, J Moran 0-1, M Maher 0-1.

22 July 1990	Glenmore	1-10 - 1-10	Fenians	Nowlan Park, Kilkenny
	R Heffernan 0-6, M Phelan 1-2, M Phelan (Alwardstown) 0-1, D Mullally 0-1.		B Purcell 0-6, B Darmody 1-0, M Phelan 0-2, J Brennan 0-1, B Behan 0-1.

22 July 1990	Graignamanagh	2-16 - 2-07	Graigue-Ballycallan
	J Byrne 0-9, M Dunne 2-1, A Foley 0-2, J Carroll 0-1, W Blanchfield 0-1, K Corbett 0-1, J Prendergast 0-1.		J Ronan 1-2, N Maher 1-0, A Ronan 0-2, J Caldbeck 0-1, M Murphy 0-1, L Comerford 0-1.

==== Group 2 table ====
Team	Matches				Score			Pts
Team	Pld	W	D	L	For	Against	Diff	Pts
Tullaroan	5	4	0	1	12-57	4-44	+37	8
Ballyhale Shamrocks	5	4	0	1	14-61	4-65	+26	8
Erin's Own	5	3	0	2	5-67	9-44	+11	6
James Stephens	5	2	0	3	8-55	7-52	+6	4
Mullinavat	5	1	0	4	10-40	12-68	-34	2
Conahy Shamrocks	5	1	0	4	2-60	16-67	-49	2

==== Group 2 results ====
28 April 1990	Erin's Own	1-09 - 0-13	Conahy Shamrocks	St. Patrick's Park, Ballyragget
	J Brennan 0-6, J Breen 1-0, B Young 0-2, J Buggy 0-1.		C Brennan 0-4, J Feehan 0-4, K Brennan 0-2, J Brennan 0-1, L Murphy 0-1, G O'Shea 0-1.

29 April 1990	James Stephens	2-04 - 0-09	Tullaroan	John Locke Park, Callan
	R Walsh 2-0, J Walton 0-3, J Hall 0-1.		B Walton 0-5, T Leahy 0-1, R Manogue 0-1, D Mullan 0-1, J O'Dwyer 0-1.

29 April 1990	Ballyhale Shamrocks	1-18 - 1-10	Mullinavat	Piltown Sportsfield, Piltown
	G Fennelly 0-7, B Fennelly 1-3, T Phelan 0-2, J Lawlor 0-2, D Fennelly 0-2, T Shefflin 0-1, B Mason 0-1.		M Dunphy 0-9, S Foskin 1-0, L Aldridge 0-1.

20 May 1990	Erin's Own	0-17 - 1-06	Tullaroan	Polo Grounds, Jenkinstown
	J Brennan 0-10, M Brennan 0-4, J Buggy 0-2, M O'Neill 0-1.		J Walton 0-4, D Walsh 1-0, D Gaffney 0-1, P Hennessy 0-1.

20 May 1990	Ballyhale Shamrocks	7-16 - 0-16	Conahy Shamrocks	Nowlan Park, Kilkenny
	B Fennelly 3-1, T Phelan 2-2, J Lawlor 1-3, G Fennelly 0-4, S Fennelly 0-3, T Shefflin 0-2, D Fennelly 0-1.		K Brennan 0-12, S Cahill 0-1, P Carroll 0-1, J Brennan 0-1, M Buggy 0-1.

20 May 1990	James Stephens	4-09 - 1-08	Mullinavat	John Locke Park, Callan
	N Kelly 2-0, L Mullan 1-3, B Wlaton 0-4, J Larkin 1-0, J O'Dwyer 0-1, D Cowhig 0-1.		M Dunphy 1-4, P Hoban 0-1, M Law 0-1, L Aldridge 0-1, J McDonald 0-1.

26 May 1990	Tullaroan	4-17 - 0-09	Conahy Shamrocks	Nowlan Park, Kilkenny
	D Gaffney 1-4, J Walton 1-4, D Walsh 1-3, S Walton 1-1, P Hennessy 0-3, J Hall 0-1.		K Brennan 0-3, P Carroll 0-2, M Watters 0-2, J Feehan 0-1, P Brennan 0-1.

27 May 1990	Erin's Own	3-17 - 3-05	Mullinavat	Nowlan Park, Kilkenny
	B Young 2-6, J Brennan 0-9, T Dwyer 1-0, J Breen 0-1, M Brennan 0-1.		S Foskin 2-0, M Dunphy 0-4, L Aldridge 1-0, P McDonald 0-1.

27 May 1990	Ballyhale Shamrocks	2-13 - 1-14	James Stephens	John Locke Park, Callan
	G Fennelly 0-5, B Fennelly 1-1, B mason 1-0, D Fennelly 0-2, P Phelan 0-1, S Fennelly 0-1, T Phelan 0-1, J Lawlor 0-1, T Shefflin 0-1.		B Walton 0-9, L Mullan 1-1, T Leahy 0-2, J O'Connor 0-1, J Larkin 0-1.

23 June 1990	James Stephens	2-13 - 1-13	Conahy Shamrocks	St. Patrick's Park, Ballyragget
	L Mullan 1-1, N Kelly 1-1, B Walton 0-4, T Leahy 0-2, E Conroy 0-2, J Hennessy 0-1, D Cowhig 0-1, T Kelly 0-1.		K Brennan 0-8, N Brennan 1-0, C Brennan 0-1, J Feehan 0-1, G Brennan 0-1, P Carroll 0-1, J Brennan 0-1.

29 June 1990	Ballyhale Shamrocks	4-10 - 0-10	Erin's Own	Nowlan Park, Kilkenny

1 July 1990	Tullaroan	3-23 - 3-05	Mullinavat	John Locke Park, Callan
	J Walton 1-5, P Hennessy 0-8, D Walsh 2-1, D Gaffney 0-5, S Walton 0-4,		M Dunphy 1-3, L Aldridge 1-0, J McDonald 1-0, S Walsh 0-2.

21 July 1990	Erin's Own	1-14 - 1-10	James Stephens	St. Patrick's Park, Ballyragget
	J Brennan 1-7, B Young 0-3, J Buggy 0-2, T Dwyer 0-1, M Brennan 0-1.		R Manogue 1-1, T Leahy 0-2, B Walton 0-2, L Mullan 0-2, E Connery 0-1, JJ Cullen 0-1, N Kelly 0-1.

22 July 1990	Tullaroan	2-15 - 1-04	Ballyhale Shamrocks	John Locke Park, Callan
	J Walton 1-1, P Fennelly 1-1, D Gaffney 0-4, D Walsh 0-3, B Hennessy 0-2, R Walsh 0-1, P Fennelly 0-1, S Dunne 0-1, S Walton 0-1.		L Fennelly 1-0, G Fennelly 0-3, T Phelan 0-1.

22 July 1990	Mullinavat	2-12 - 1-09	Conahy Shamrocks	Nowlan Park, Kilkenny
	M Dunphy 0-6, P McEvoy 1-2, L Aldridge 1-2, J McDonald 0-1, S Walsh 0-1.		P Carroll 1-1, N Brennan 0-4, K Brennan 0-4.

=== Relegation play-offs ===
8 September 1990 Play-off	Mullinavat	1-10 - 0-10	Conahy Shamrocks	John Locke Park, Callan

15 September 1990 Final	Graigue-Ballycallan	4-10 - 1-09	Conahy Shamrocks	St. John's Park, Kilkenny
	J Ronan 3-5, A Ronan 1-3, M Hennessy 0-1, M Murphy 0-1.		J Brennan 0-4, M Buggy 1-0, K Brennan 0-2, J Feehan 0-2, C Brennan 0-1.

=== Quarter-finals ===
10 August 1990 Quarter-final	Fenians	3-10 - 1-14	Ballyhale Shamrocks	Nowlan Park, Kilkenny
	B Purcell 0-5, PJ Delaney 1-0, M Phelan 1-0, B Fitzpatrick 1-0, M Walsh 0-2, J Brennan 0-2, P McCormack 0-1.		G Fennelly 1-4, J Lawlor 0-4, B Fennelly 0-3, L Fennelly 0-2, B Mason 0-1.

11 August 1990 Quarter-final	Clara	2-11 - 0-10	Erin's Own	Nowlan Park, Kilkenny
	A Prendergast 1-8, L Ryan 1-0, J Casey 0-3.		J Brennan 0-6, B Young 0-4.

=== Semi-finals ===
26 August 1990 Semi-final	Glenmore	6-12 - 0-08	Fenians	Nowlan Park, Kilkenny
	C Heffernan 2-1, M Phelan 2-1, D Mullally 1-3, R Heffernan 0-4, M Phelan 1-0, J Flynn 0-2, D Heffernan 0-1.		B Purcell 0-5, B Ryan 0-1, PJ Delaney 0-1, P McCormack 0-1.	Referee: P Long (Carrickshock)

26 August 1990 Semi-final	Clara	1-10 - 0-13	Tullaroan	Nowlan Park, Kilkenny
	A Prendergast 0-8, E Mulrooney 1-0, P Campion 0-1, S Whearty 0-1.		P Hennessy 0-6, J Walton 0-3, D Gaffney 0-2, D Walsh 0-1, R Walsh 0-1.	Referee: J Guinan (Lisdowney)

23 September 1990 Semi-final replay	Clara	1-17 - 0-06	Tullaroan	Nowlan Park, Kilkenny
	A Prendergast 0-8, S Whearty 1-1, J Nolan 0-4, L Ryan 0-2, J Casey 0-1, J Langton 0-1.		D Gaffney 0-4, P Hennessy 0-1, T Gaffney 0-1.	Referee: J Guinan (Lisdowney)

=== Final ===
7 October 1990 Final	Glenmore	3-15 - 2-06	Clara	Nowlan Park, Kilkenny
	C Heffernan 2-0, R Heffernan 0-6, J Heffernan 1-0, D Mullally 0-3, M Phelan 0-3, M Phelan 0-2, J Flynn 0-1.		A Prendergast 2-4, L Ryan 0-1, J Nolan 0-1.	Referee: D Cody (Graignamanagh)
