= 1984 All-Ireland Under-21 Hurling Championship =

All-Ireland Under-21 Hurling Championship 1984
All Ireland Champions
- Winners: Kilkenny (4th win)
- Captain: Séamus Delahunty

All Ireland Runners-up
- Runners-up: Tipperary
- Captain: Donal Kealy

Provincial Champions
- Munster: Tipperary
- Leinster: Kilkenny
- Ulster: Down
- Connacht: Not Played

The 1984 All-Ireland Under-21 Hurling Championship was the 21st staging of the All-Ireland Under-21 Hurling Championship since its establishment by the Gaelic Athletic Association in 1964.

Galway were the defending champions, however, they were beaten by Tipperary in the All-Ireland semi-final.

On 22 August 1984, Kilkenny won the championship following a 1-12 to 0-11 defeat of Tipperary in the All-Ireland final. This was their fourth All-Ireland title in the under-21 grade and their first in seven championship seasons.

== Results ==
=== Leinster Under-21 Hurling Championship ===
Final

15 July 1984 Final	Kilkenny	0-18 - 1-10	Wexford	Dr. Cullen Park, Carlow
	R Heffernan 0-5, D Carroll 0-3, T Phelan 0-2, P Walsh 0-2, L McCarthy 0-2, R McCarthy 0-2, J McDonald 0-1, M Rafter 0-1.		J Codd 0-5, F O'Leary 1-0, T Demspey 0-2, P Owley 0-1, P McGrath 0-1, P Barden 0-1.	Referee: J Henry (Westmeath)

=== Munster Under-21 Hurling Championship ===
First round

25 April 1984 First round	Kerry	1-05 - 9-09	Limerick	Abbeydorney
	D O'Donoghue 1-1, J O'Sullivan 0-2, M Chase 0-1, J Tully 0-1.		M Quaid 2-2, S Fitzgibbon 2-1, N Sheehan 2-1, J Hegarty 1-2, R Sampson 1-2, P McCarthy 1-0, P Creamer 0-1.

25 April 1984 First round	Tipperary	1-12 - 1-12	Clare	Semple Stadium, Thurles
	M Scully 0-6, W Peters 1-0, W Sheedy 0-3, P Kenny 0-2, J Kennedy 0-1.		V Donnellan 1-7, M Guilfoyle 0-2, V O'Loughlin 0-1, A Cunningham 0-1, B McNamara 0-1.

2 May 1984 First round replay	Clare	1-09 - 2-13	Tipperary	Cusack Park, Ennis
	V Donnellan 0-5, T Guilfoyle 1-1, A Cunningham 0-1, J McInerney 0-1, V O'Loughlin 0-1.		M Scully 0-9, P Kenny 1-2, T Waters 1-0, W Peters 0-2.	Referee: K Walsh (Limerick)

Semi-finals

9 May 1984 Semi-final	Cork	3-11 - 3-16	Tipperary	Páirc Uí Chaoimh, Cork
	T McCarthy 0-5, E Kenneally 1-1, C Ring 0-4, T Coakley 1-0, T Mulcahy 1-0, G Fitzgerald 0-1.		T Waters 2-2, D Fogarty 1-1, M Scully 0-5, P Kenny 0-3, W Peters 0-1, N Sheehy 0-1, A Ryan 0-1, J Kennedy 0-1, R Stakelum 0-1.	Referee: J Moore (Waterford)

9 May 1984 Semi-final	Limerick	3-10 - 3-08	Waterford	Gaelic Grounds, Limerick
	P McCarthy 2-0, S Fitzgibbon 1-2, R Sampson 0-4, M Nelligan 0-2, R Quigley 0-1, B Finn 0-1.		P Hennebry 2-0, P Curley 1-1, A Rockett 0-3, K Delahunty 0-3, T Naughton 0-1.	Referee: G Long (Tipperary)

Final

25 July 1984 Final	Limerick	1-08 - 0-12	Tipperary	Gaelic Grounds, Limerick
	R Sampson 0-4, M Nelligan 1-0, P McCarthy 0-2, B Finn 0-1, S Fitzgibbon 0-1.		M Scully 0-6, N Sheehy 0-2, A Ryan 0-2, J Hayes 0-1, W Peters 0-1.

=== All-Ireland Under-21 Hurling Championship ===
Semi-finals

12 August 1984 Semi-final	Kilkenny	5-16 - 1-09	Down	St. Loman's Park, Trim
	L McCarthy 2-3, S Delahunty 2-1, R Heffernan 0-5, J McDonald 1-1, D Carroll 0-2, T Phelan 0-1, P Walsh 0-1, R McCarthy 0-1, M Rafter 0-1.		H Gilmore 1-4, A Mageean 0-2, C Mageean 0-1, D O'Prey 0-1, R Coffey 0-1.	Referee: P McCormack (Meath)

12 August 1984 Semi-final	Tipperary	3-10 - 2-08	Galway	Cusack Park, Ennis
	M Scully 0-5, D Fogarty 1-1, T Waters 1-0, C Bonnar 1-0, W Peters 0-2, J Leahy 0-1, P Kenny 0-1.		E Ryan 1-2, J Cooney 1-0, S Burke 0-3, J Byrne 0-1, M Costelloe 0-1, M McGrath 0-1.	Referee: N Duggan (Limerick)

Final

26 August 1984 Final	Kilkenny	1-12 - 0-11	Tipperary	Walsh Park, Waterford
	R Heffernan 1-4, L McCarthy 0-4, P Walsh 0-1, D Carroll 0-1, M Rafter 0-1, P Ryan 0-1.		M Scully 0-5, D Fogarty 0-2, J Hayes 0-2, D Kealey 0-1, A Waters 0-1.	Referee: K Walsh (Limerick)
