= 1981 All-Ireland Minor Hurling Championship =

All-Ireland Minor Hurling Championship 1981
All Ireland Champions
- Winners: Kilkenny (12th win)
- Captain: Eddie Kennedy
- Manager: Eddie Keher

All Ireland Runners-up
- Runners-up: Galway

Provincial Champions
- Munster: Clare
- Leinster: Kilkenny
- Ulster: Not Played
- Connacht: Not Played

The 1981 All-Ireland Minor Hurling Championship was the 51st staging of the All-Ireland Minor Hurling Championship since its establishment by the Gaelic Athletic Association in 1928.

Tipperary entered the championship as the defending champions, however, they were beaten by Clare in the Munster final.

On 6 September 1981 Kilkenny won the championship following a 1-20 to 3-9 defeat of Galway in the All-Ireland final. This was their 12th All-Ireland title and their first in four championship seasons.

== Results ==
=== Leinster Minor Hurling Championship ===
Final

12 July 1981 Final	Kilkenny	3-10 - 3-9	Wexford	Croke Park, Dublin
	R Heffernan 1-2, D Carroll 1-0, L McCarthy 1-0, E Kennedy 1-0 (og), J McDonald 0-3, P Cleere 0-2, P Ryan 0-2, S Delahunty 0-1.		T Morrissey 1-3, J Byrne 0-5, T Dempsey 1-0, E Cleary 0-1.	Referee: JJ Bailey (Dublin)

=== Munster Minor Hurling Championship ===
First round

25 April 1981 First round	Clare	4-07 - 1-06	Waterford	Canon Hayes Park, Bansha
	J Lynch 2-1, M Guilfoyle 1-2, D Chaplin 1-1, B McNamara 0-3.		S Ahearne 0-5, P Curley 1-0, E O'Brien 0-1.

29 April 1981 First round	Kerry	0-02 - 10-17	Tipperary	Austin Stack Park, Tralee

Semi-finals

15 May 1981 Semi-final	Tipperary	2-13 - 2-06	Limerick	Páirc Mac Gearailt, Fermoy
	W Peters 1-6, B Ryan 1-0, A Browne 0-3, S Nolan 0-2, D Fogarty 0-1, T Waters 0-1.		M Nelligan 0-5, P McCarthy 1-1, JJ Thompson 1-0.	Referee: J Moore (Waterford)

16 May 1981 Semi-final	Clare	2-06 - 0-06	Cork	Bruff
	D Chaplin 2-0, M Guilfoyle 0-3, B McNamara 0-1, J Lynch 0-1, M Leamy 0-1.		T O'Sullivan 0-3, J Noonan 0-2, K Kingston 0-1.	Referee: M O'Grady (Tipperary)

Final

5 July 1981 Final	Tipperary	3-11 - 3-13	Clare	Semple Stadium, Thurles
	A Brown 2-1, W Peters 1-4, P Kenny 0-2, S Nolan 0-1, PJ Kavanagh 0-1, D Fogarty 0-1, G Ryan 0-1.		M Guilfoyle 1-3, V Donnellan 0-5, J Lynch 1-1, V O'Loughlin 1-0, B McNamara 0-2, A Walsh 0-2.	Referee: F Murphy (Cork)

=== All-Ireland Minor Hurling Championship ===
Semi-final

2 August 1981 Semi-final	Galway	3-14 - 3-8	Clare	Croke Park, Dublin
	A Cunningham 2-2, T Keady 1-2, J Leahy 0-4, J Burke 0-2, M McGrath 0-2, P Burke 0-1, É Ryan 0-1.		V Donnellan 2-4, J Cremmins 1-0, M Guilfoyle 0-2, V O'Loughlin 0-1, B McNamara 0-1.	Referee: S Denton (Wexford)

Final

6 September 1981 Final	Kilkenny	1-20 - 3-9	Galway	Croke Park, Dublin
	T Bawle 0-5, R Heffernan 0-5, L McCarthy 1-1, J McDonald 0-4, D Carroll 0-2, S Delahunty 0-2, P Cleere 0-1.		M McGrath 1-2, É Ryan 1-1, A Cunningham 1-0, J Leahy 0-3, P Burke 0-1, P Winters 0-1, M Coleman 0-1.	Referee: M Kelleher (Kildare)
