= 1995–96 All-Ireland Senior Club Hurling Championship =

All-Ireland Senior Club Hurling Championship 1995–96
Championship Details
- Dates: 30 September 1995 – 17 March 1996
- Teams: 28

All Ireland Champions
- Winners: Sixmilebridge (1st win)
- Captain: Gerry McInerney

All Ireland Runners-up
- Runners-up: Dunloy

Provincial Champions
- Munster: Sixmilebridge
- Leinster: Glenmore
- Ulster: Dunloy
- Connacht: Sarsfield's

Championship Statistics
- Matches Played: 29
- Top Scorer: Gerry McInerney (5–15)

The 1995–96 All-Ireland Senior Club Hurling Championship was the 26th staging of the All-Ireland Senior Club Hurling Championship, the Gaelic Athletic Association's premier inter-county club hurling tournament. The championship ran from 30 September 1995 to 17 March 1996.

Birr of Offaly were the defending champions, however, they failed to qualify after being beaten in the 1995 Offaly SHC.

The All-Ireland final was played at Croke Park in Dublin on 17 March 1996, between Sixmilebridge of Clare and Dunloy of Antrim, in what was a first championship meeting between the teams. Sixmilebridge won the match by 5–10 to 2–06 to claim a first title.

Sixmilebridge's Gerry McInerney was the championship's top scorer with 5–15.

== Results ==
=== Connacht Senior Club Hurling Championship ===
First round

1 October 1995 First round	Tubbercurry	2–09 – 0–02	St. Mary's Kiltoghert	Kilcoyne Park, Tubbercurry

Quarter-final

14 October 1995 Quarter-final	Tubbercurry	1–03 – 3–05	Tooreen	Kilcoyne Park, Tubbercurry
			D Greally 2–3, V Henry 1–0, J Cunnane 0–1, P Higgins 0–1.

Semi-finals

29 October 1995 Semi-final	Tooreen	1–11 – 0–14	Tremane	Knock Road, Ballyhaunis
	J Cunnane 0–6, D Greally 1–0, F Browne 0–4, F Delaney 0–1.		B Naughton 0–8, P Tiernan 0–2, J Haughey 0–1, S Healy 0–1, G Lynch 0–1.	Referee: JJ Larkin (Galway)

12 November 1995 Semi-final replay	Tooreen	0–09 – 0–07	Tremane	Knock Road, Ballyhaunis
	J Cunnane 0–6, P Higgins 0–1, F Browne 0–1, F Delaney 0–1.		B Naughton 0–4, M Healy 0–1, P Lynch 0–1, T Healy 0–1.

Final

26 November 1995 Final	Tooreen	0–05 – 2–17	Sarsfields	Knock Road, Ballyhaunis
	M Gorman 0–2, J Cunnane 0–2, P Higgins 0–1.		A Donoghue 1–5, M McGrath 0–4, M Kenny 1–0, J Cooney 0–2, Peter Kelly 0–2, Pádraic Kelly 0–1, N Morrissey 0–1, J McGrath 0–1, Peter Cooney 0–1.

=== Leinster Senior Club Hurling Championship ===
Preliminary round

30 September 1995 Preliminary round	Naomh Moninne	1–12 – 1–05	Wolfe Tones	Páirc an Chuinnigh, Knockbridge
	J Murphy 1–3, P Fallon 0–2, C Connolly 0–2, P Dunne 0–2, J Temple 0–1, A Hoey 0–1, T Murphy 0–1.		M Forde 1–2, S Byrne 0–2, J Lynn 0–1.

First round

14 October 1995 First round	Naomh Moninne	1–11 – 0–17	Killyon	Dundalk
	J Murphy 1–3, A Hoey 0–3, D Dunne 0–2, P Dunne 0–1, J Temple 0–1, J Kennedy 0–1.		M Massey 0–11, D Dorran 0–2, R Dorran 0–2, P Gannon 0–1, M Gannon 0–1.	Referee: D Maher (Dublin)

15 October 1995 First round	Castlepollard	1–04 – 1–12	Naomh Eoin	Collinstown
	M Dermody 1–0, S McLoughlin 0–2, D Nea 0–1, B Kennedy 0–1.		M Slye 1–6, J Byrne 0–2, A Curry 0–2, P Quirke 0–1, C Jordan 0–1.

15 October 1995 First round	Kiltegan	2–13 – 1–10	Coill Dubh	Aughrim County Ground, Aughrim
	J Keogh 0–7, K Furlong 1–3, D Hayes 1–0, S Byrne 0–1, N Cremin 0–1, J O'Toole 0–1.		R Byrne 1–7, T Carew 0–2, D Behan 0–1.

Quarter-finals

28 October 1995 Quarter-final	Killyon	3–06 – 1–21	Glenmore	St. Loman's Park, Trim
	M Massey 1–2, T Massey 1–0, J Doran 1–0, M Gannon 0–2, T Duignan 0–2.		D Mullally 0–5, W O'Connor 1–1, M Phelan 0–4, M Murphy 0–2, P Mullally 0–2, J Murphy 0–2, J Heffernan 0–1, D Heffernan 0–1, C Heffernan 0–1, J Phelan 0–1, S Dollard 0–1.

29 October 1995 Quarter-final	Castletown	0–08 – 2–17	Oulart-the Ballagh	O'Moore Park, Portlaoise
			S Dunne 0–10, P Redmond 1–1, J Ormonde 1–0, M Storey 0–2, P Finn 0–2, B Redmond 0–1.	Referee: J Guinan (Kilkenny)

29 October 1995 Quarter-final	Naomh Eoin	0–07 – 3–10	Seir Kieran	Dr. Cullen Park, Carlow
	M Slye 0–3, B Murphy 0–2, J Byrne 0–2.		Johnny Dooley 1–6, E Coughlan 2–0, M Coughlan 0–2, F O'Neill 0–1, B Dooley 0–1.	Referee: P Neary (Kilkenny)

29 October 1995 Quarter-final	Kiltegan	1–10 – 1–03	O'Toole's	Aughrim County Ground, Aughrim
	J Keogh 0–7, A Coleman 1–0, K Furlong 0–1, J O'Toole 0–1, J Bermingham 0–1.		K Flynn 1–1, N Howard 0–2.	Referee: D Murphy (Wexford)

Semi-finals

11 November 1995 Semi-final	Oulart-the Ballagh	3–14 – 0–05	Kiltegan	Dr. Cullen Park, Carlow
	J Mythen 1–3, S Dunne 1–3, P Finn 1–0, B Redmond 0–2, M Redmond 0–2, D O'Connor 0–2, M Dempsey 0–1, P Redmond 0–1.		K Furlong 0–2, N Cremin 0–2, J Keogh 0–1.	Referee: P Delaney (Laois)

11 November 1995 Semi-final	Glenmore	1–14 – 0–12	Seir Kieran	Dr. Cullen Park, Carlow
	M Murphy 1–1, R Heffernan 0–4, D Mullally 0–3, M Phelan 0–3, S Dollard 0–2, J Phelan 0–1.		Johnny Dooley 0–7, J Coakley 0–3, B Dooley 0–1, Joe Dooley 0–1.

Final

26 November 1995 Final	Glenmore	2–13 – 2–10	Oulart-the Ballagh	Dr. Cullen Park, Carlow
	J Walsh 1–0, M Murphy 1–0, S Dollard 0–3, M Phelan 0–3, R Heffernan 0–3, D Mullally 0–2, C Heffernan 0–2.		S Dunne 2–1, M Storey 0–4, B O'Connor 0–2, B Redmond 0–1, M Redmond 0–1, P Finn 0–1.	Referee: P Aherne (Carlow)

=== Munster Senior Club Hurling Championship ===
Quarter-finals

28 October 1995 Quarter-final	Na Piarsaigh	1–12 – 1–12	Ballygunner	Páirc Uí Rinn, Cork
	JA Moran 1–2, T O'Sullivan 0–4, Mark Mullins 0–2, G Daly 0–2, J O'Connor 0–2.		D Codd 1–1, L Whitty 0–3, B O'Sullivan 0–3, P Flynn 0–3, M Mahony 0–1, D O'Sullivan 0–1.	Referee: T Murray (Limerick)

29 October 1995 Quarter-final	Patrickswell	3–19 – 2–05	Ballyduff	Gaelic Grounds, Limerick
	G Kirby 1–7, A Purcell 1–2, N Carey 1–1, B Foley 0–3, A Carmody 0–3, E Geary 0–2, D O'Grady 0–1.		M Joy 1–0, K Boyle 1–0, J Hennessy 0–3, P O'Rourke 0–2.	Referee: TJ Corby (Tipperary)

4 November 1995 Quarter-final replay	Ballygunner	2–08 – 2–07	Na Piarsaigh	Walsh Park, Waterford
	B O'Sullivan 1–0, P Flynn 1–0, L Whitty 0–3, M Mahony 0–2, D Codd 0–1, D O'Sullivan 0–1, S Frampton 0–1.		JA Moran 1–2, J O'Connor 1–0, Mickey Mullins 0–2, G Daly 0–1, P O'Connor 0–1, Mark Mullins 0–1.	Referee: T Murray (Limerick)

Semi-finals

12 November 1995 Semi-final	Nenagh Éire Óg	1–14 – 0–17	Patrickswell	Semple Stadium, Thurles
	E Tucker 1–2, M Cleary 0–5, K Tucker 0–3, R Tomlinson 0–2, J Kennedy 0–1, J Heffernan 0–1.		G Kirby 0–8, A Purcell 0–3, N Carey 0–2, B Foley 0–2, D O'Grady 0–1, S Kirby 0–1.	Referee: S McMahon (Clare)

12 November 1995 Semi-final	Sixmilebridge	5–11 – 2–10	Ballygunner	Semple Stadium, Thurles
	G McInerney 1–6, J Chaplin 1–1, A Mulready 1–0, D McInerney 1–0, David Chaplin 1–0, M Conlon 0–2, Danny Chaplin 0–1, F Quilligan 0–1.		L Whitty 0–6, P Flynn 1–1, T Carroll 1–0, D Codd 0–1, P Power 0–1, D O'Sullivan 0–1.	Referee: G Harrington (Cork)

18 November 1995 Semi-final replay	Patrickswell	1–12 – 3–11	Nenagh Éire Óg	Gaelic Grounds, Limerick
	G Kirby 1–6, A Carmody 0–3, B Foley 0–2, R Fitzgerald 0–1.		M Cleary 1–6, J Heffernan 2–1, E Tucker 0–2, K Tucker 0–2.	Referee: S McMahon (Clare)

Final

26 November 1995 Final	Sixmilebridge	2–18 – 1–07	Nenagh Éire Óg	Gaelic Grounds, Limerick
	G McInerney 1–2, J Chaplin 0–5, D Fitzgerald 1–0, M Conlon 0–4, D McInenrey 0–3, David Chaplin 0–2, Danny Chaplin 0–1, N Earlie 0–1.		M Cleary 0–5, K Tucker 1–0, R Tomlinson 0–1, E Tucker 0–1.	Referee: P O'Connor (Limerick)

=== Ulster Senior Club Hurling Championship ===
Semi-finals

24 September 1995 Semi-final	Middletown Na Fianna	1–04 – 2–22	Dunloy	Athletic Grounds, Armagh
	B McCann 1–0, S Mulholland 0–1, D McBride 0–1, M Grimes 0–1, A Jordan 0–1.		A Elliott 2–1, Greg O'Kane 0–6, T McGrath 0–5, F McMullan 0–4, L Richmond 0–2, Gary O'Kane 0–1, N Elliott 0–1, J Elliott 0–1, M McBride 0–1.

24 September 1995 Semi-final	Ballycran	w/o – scr.	Lavey	O'Neill Park, Dungannon

Final

15 October 1995 Final	Dunloy	2–18 – 0–09	Ballycran	Casement Park, Belfast
	A Elliot 2–0, Greg O'Kane 0–4, J Elliot 0–4, E McKee 0–3, F McMullen 0–2, S McMullen 0–1, Gary O'Kane 0–1, N Elliot 0–1, T McGrath 0–1, M Molloy 0–1.		D O'Prey 0–4, J McCarthy 0–2, D Hughes 0–1, K Blaney 0–1, C Arthurs 0–1.

=== All-Ireland Senior Club Hurling Championship ===
Quarter-final

26 November 1995 Quarter-final	St. Gabriel's	0–09 – 1–16	Dunloy	Emerald GAA Grounds, Ruislip
	N Lyons 0–7, B Dolan 0–1, D Murphy 0–1.	Report	Gregory O'Kane 0–9, L Richmond 1–1, N Molloy 0–2, N Elliot 0–2, A Elliot 0–1, Gary O'Kane 0–1.	Referee: P Horan (Offaly)

Semi-finals

11 February 1996 Semi-final	Dunloy	2–13 – 0–07	Glenmore	Croke Park, Dublin
	Gregory O'Kane 0–5, A Elliot 1–1, F McMullan 1–0, Jarlath Elliot 0–3, S McMullan 0–2, Tony McGrath 0–2.		R Heffernan 0–2, M Phelan 0–2, D Heffernan 0–1, S Dollard 0–1, D Mullally 0–1.	Attendance: 2,375; Referee: P O'Connor (Limerick)

11 February 1996 Semi-final	Sixmilebridge	5–11 – 1–12	Sarsfields	Semple Stadium, Thurles
	G McInerney 2–4, David Chaplin 1–1, Danny Chaplin 1–0, F Quilligan 1–2, D McInerney 0–2, J Chaplin 0–2.		Peter Kelly 1–3, A Donohue 0–4, N Morrissey 0–2, J McGrath 0–1, M Kenny 0–1, P Cooney 0–1.	Attendance: 5,630; Referee: D MUrphy (Wexford)

Final

17 March 1996 Final	Sixmilebridge	5–10 – 2–06	Dunloy	Croke Park, Dublin
	David Chaplin 2–1, G McInerney 1–3, D McInerney 1–0, Danny Chaplin 1–0, N Gilligan 0–3, J Chaplin 0–2, N Earley 0–1.		T McGrath 1–1, A Elliot 1–1, S McMullan 0–2, F McMullan 0–1, Gregory O'Kane 0–1.	Referee: D Murphy (Wexford)

== Championship statistics ==
=== Top scorers ===
Top scorers overall

Rank	Player	Club	Tally	Total	Matches	Average
1	Gerry McInerney	Sixmilebridge	5–15	30	4	7.50
2	Gary Kirby	Patrickswell	2–21	27	3	9.00
3	Gregory O'Kane	Dunloy	0–25	25	5	5.00
4	Seán Dunne	Oulart-the Ballagh	3–14	23	3	7.66
5	Alistair Elliott	Dunloy	6-04	22	5	4.40
6	Michael Cleary	Nenagh Éire Óg	1–16	19	3	6.33
7	David Chaplin	Sixmilebridge	4-04	16	4	4.00
7	Martin Massey	Killyon	1–13	16	2	8.00
7	Johnny Dooley	Seir Kieran	1–13	16	2	8.00
8	Johnny Cunanne	Tooreen	0–15	15	4	3.75

Top scorers in a single game

Rank	Player	Club	Tally	Total	Opposition
1	Martin Massey	Killyon	0–11	11	Naomh Moninne
2	Gerry McInerney	Sixmilebridge	2-04	10	Sarsfields
2	Gary Kirby	Patrickswell	1-07	10	Ballyduff
2	Ronan Byrne	Coill Dubh	1-07	10	Kiltegan
2	Seán Dunne	Oulart-the Ballagh	0–10	10	Castletown
3	Dom Greally	Tooreen	2-03	9	Tubbercurry
3	Mick Slye	Naomh Eoin	1-06	9	Castlepollard
3	Johnny Dooley	Seir Kieran	1-06	9	Naomh Eoin
3	Gerry McInerney	Sixmilebridge	1-06	9	Ballygunner
3	Gary Kirby	Patrickswell	1-06	9	Nenagh Éire Óg
3	Michael Cleary	Nenagh Éire Óg	1-06	9	Patrickswell
3	Gregory O'Kane	Dunloy	0-09	9	St. Gabriel's
