= Ballyragget =

Town in County Kilkenny, Ireland

Ballyragget Béal Átha Ragad
- Town
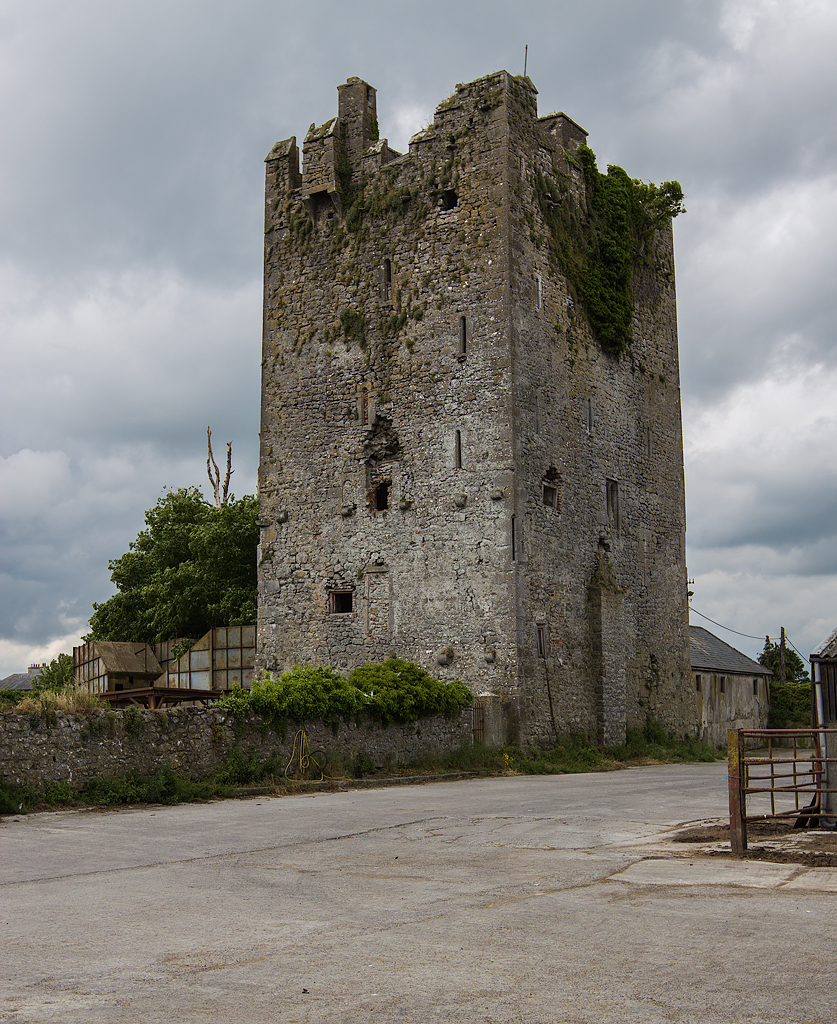
- Ballyragget Castle, a 15th century tower house, overlooks the town

- Location in Ireland
- Coordinates: 52°47′20″N 7°19′58″W
- Country: Ireland
- Province: Leinster
- County: County Kilkenny

Population (2022)
  - Total: 1,116
- Time zone: UTC+0 (WET)
  - Summer (DST): UTC-1 (IST (WEST))

Ballyragget (Irish: Béal Átha Ragad, meaning 'mouth of Ragget's ford') is a small town on the river Nore in the north of County Kilkenny in Ireland. Ballyragget is on the N77 road, 18 km (11 mi) north of Kilkenny. As of the 2022 census, it had a population of 1,082 people.

== Toponymy ==
The name 'Ragget' is Anglo-Norman in origin, and denotes a once-prominent Norman landowner Richard le Ragget who held these lands in the early part of the 13th century.

Older names of the settlement include Donoughmore (or Donaghmore; Irish: Domhnach Mór "large church") and the even more ancient Tullabarry (Irish: Tualach Bare) - the name of a Celtic or possibly pre-Celtic tribe which held their seat in the vicinity. There is some debate as to the meaning of Donoughmore. The first issue of the Journal of the Kilkenny Archaeological Society, from January 1948, included an article about Ballyragget and its environs. This article suggests that Domhnach Mór means "big Sunday" and that this derivation arose from the large congregation of people that attended the opening of the now ruined church in Donoughmore - and that this name stuck.

== History ==
Early archaeological sites in the area include multiple ringfort, ring ditch, enclosure and fulacht fiadh sites in the townlands of Ballyragget, Donaghmore and Parksgrove.

The settlement of Ballyragget itself originally formed at a fording-point on the River Nore. Originally named after the 13th century Anglo-Norman landowner Richard le Ragget, Ballyragget was later held by the Mountgarret family. The town is dominated by a large medieval tower house. This tower house, known as Ballyragget Castle, is five storeys in height and surrounded by a court or bawn which has round defensive towers in each of four corners. A moat originally surrounded the keep and bawn, but now this can only be seen outside the north wall. This tower was renovated in the late 15th century, and contains a late 16th century inscribed stone which commemorates Edmund Butler, 2nd Viscount Mountgarret.

Much of the town streetscape was laid out by George Butler and his grandson Robert Butler around the town's square in the mid-17th century. A large mid 19th-century Catholic church sits on a rise overlooking the town's central square.

== Geography ==
The River Nore flows beside the town, which nestles in a wide alluvial valley between the Attanagh Plateau and several hills to the east, including 'Knockmannon' and 'The Balla boys'. The Nore passes by one of the most significant ancient sites in North Kilkenny 5 kilometres (3.1 mi) south of Ballyragget at Rathbeagh. The statistical Ballyragget Geographical Area is recorded by the CSO as containing 26.67 square kilometres (10.30 sq mi).

To the north lies the town of Durrow in County Laois, to the south the River Nore flows on towards Kilkenny City.

The town is located in the townland of the same name which is in the civil parish of Donoghmore in the historical barony of Fassadinin.

== Demographics ==
According to A Topographical Dictionary of Ireland, published by Samuel Lewis in 1837, the town of Ballyragget then had a population of 1,629. By 1991, the town had 814 residents.

Central Statistics Office reports indicate that Ballyragget's population increased by over 30% in the 20 years between the 1996 and the 2016 census, from 803 to 1,082 inhabitants. As of the 2022 census, the town had a population of 1,116.

Approximately 82% of census respondents in 2022 indicated that they were nominally Roman Catholic, with 6% of other religions and 12% having no religion or no stated religion.

== Economy ==
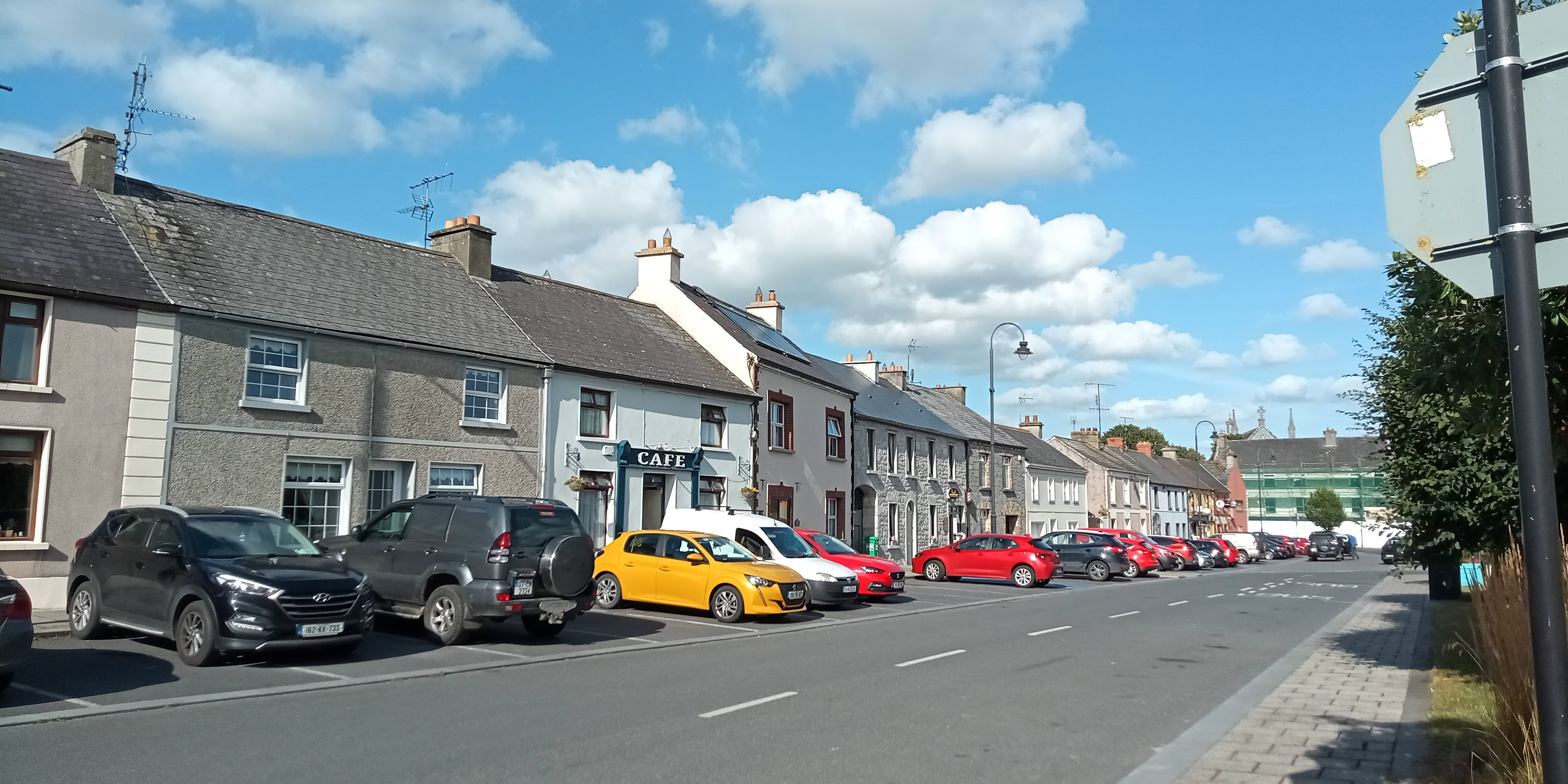
The Square, Ballyragget

Agriculture and the agri-food industry are the largest employers, with the large Tirlán factory across the river contributing to the town's economy for several decades. According to Tirlán (formerly known as Glanbia), its plant at Ballyragget is "the largest multi-purpose integrated dairy plant in Europe".

Approximately 39% of respondents to the 2022 census indicated that their commute to work (or education) took longer than 30 minutes.

== Education ==
The national (primary) school in Ballyragget opened, in August 2018, following the amalgamation of Scoil Naomh Bhríde and Scoil Chiaráin Naofa. As of 2022, Ballyragget National School had an enrollment of 136 pupils. There is no secondary school in the town.

== Politics ==
At national level, Ballyragget, as part of the Carlow–Kilkenny constituency, is represented by five Teachtaí Dála in Dáil Éireann.

At a local level, the town is within the administrative area of Kilkenny County Council.

== People ==
- Mabel Cahill (1863–1905), a champion tennis player who won the U.S. Open and held the singles, doubles and mixed titles for 1891–1892, was born in Ballyragget
- William Carrigan (1860–1924), Catholic priest and historian from Muckalee (Ballyfoyle) in County Kilkenny, was curate in Ballyragget from 1886 to 1891
- Patrick Phelan (1795–1857), Catholic Bishop of Kingston in Ontario, Canada, was born in the area.

== See also ==
- St Patrick's GAA, Ballyragget
- List of towns and villages in Ireland
