= Glenmore GAA =

Gaelic games club in County Kilkenny, Ireland

Glenmore
- Gleann Mór
- Founded: 1888
- County: Kilkenny
- Colours
- Grounds: Glenmore GAA Grounds
- Coordinates: 52.344°N 7.06°W

Playing kits
Standard colours

Senior Club Championships
	All Ireland	Leinster champions	Kilkenny champions
Football:	0	0	20
Hurling:	1	2	5

Glenmore GAA is a Gaelic Athletic Association club located in Glenmore, County Kilkenny, Ireland. The club is affiliated to the Kilkenny County Board and fields teams in hurling and Gaelic football.

== History ==
Located in the village of Glenmore, on the Kilkenny-Wexford border, Glenmore GAA Club was founded in 1888. The club was initially concerned with Gaelic football, won its first Kilkenny SFC title in 1906 and continued to win further titles at regular intervals. Glenmore held the top position on the all-time roll of honour between 1922 and 2009, by which time the club had amassed 20 Kilkenny SFC titles.

In spite of winning the Kilkenny JHC title in 1923, it would take another few decades before the club became force on the hurling field. Further Kilkenny JHC titles were won in 1953 and 1980, before the club claimed the Kilkenny IHC title in 1982. Between 1987 and 1999, Glenmore won five Kilkenny SHC titles and two Leinster Club SHC titles, with players such as Christy Heffernan, Michael Phelan and the O'Connor brothers - Eddie and Willie. On 17 March 1991, Glenmore won the All-Ireland Club SHC title, after beating Patrickswell by 1–13 to 0–12 in the final.

The turn of the century saw Glenmore lose their senior status before later facing relegation from the intermediate grade. The club's fifth Kilkenny JHC title in 2015 was later converted into a Leinster Club JHC title. Glenmore later beat Eoghan Rua by 2–09 to 0–12 to win the All-Ireland Club JHC title. The club later regained it's senior status after winning the Kilkenny IHC title in 2021.

== Honours ==
- All-Ireland Senior Club Hurling Championship (1): 1991
- Leinster Senior Club Hurling Championship (2): 1990, 1995
- Kilkenny Senior Hurling Championship (5): 1987, 1990, 1992, 1995, 1999
- Kilkenny Senior Football Championship (20): 1906, 1915, 1916, 1920, 1922, 1923, 1924, 1929, 1938, 1939, 1940, 1942, 1943, 1949, 1950, 1954, 1955, 1989, 1998, 2009
- Kilkenny Intermediate Hurling Championship (2): 1982, 2021
- All-Ireland Junior Club Hurling Championship (1): 2016
- Leinster Junior Club Hurling Championship (1): 2015
- Kilkenny Junior Hurling Championship (5): 1923, 1953, 1980, 1991, 2015
- Kilkenny Under-21 Hurling Championship (3): 1980, 1982, 1988

== Notable players ==
- Eddie O'Connor: All-Ireland SHC-winning captain (1993)
- Willie O'Connor: All-Ireland SHC-winning captain (2000)
