= Christy Heffernan =

Irish hurler

Personal information
- Native name: Críostóir Ó hIfearnáin (Irish)
- Born: 26 December 1957 (age 68) Glenmore, County Kilkenny, Ireland
- Occupations: Insurance Broker & Auctioneer
- Height: 6 ft 4 in (193 cm)

Sport
- Sport: Hurling
- Position: Full-forward
Club
- Years: Club
- 1975-1999: Glenmore
Club titles
- Kilkenny titles: 4
- Leinster titles: 2
- All-Ireland Titles: 1
Inter-county*
Years	County	Apps (scores)
1979-1993	Kilkenny	32 (16-34)
Inter-county titles
- Leinster titles: 7
- All-Irelands: 4
- NHL: 4
- All Stars: 1
- *Inter County team apps and scores correct as of 22:45, 21 November 2016.

Christy Heffernan (born 26 December 1957) is an Irish retired hurler who played as a full-forward for the Kilkenny senior team.

Born in Glenmore, County Kilkenny, Heffernan first arrived on the inter-county scene at the age of twenty-two when he first linked up with the Kilkenny senior team. He made his senior debut during the 1981 championship. Heffernan went on to play a key part for Kilkenny, and won four All-Ireland medals, seven Leinster medals and four National Hurling League medals. He was an All-Ireland runner-up on two occasions.

As a member of the Leinster inter-provincial team on a number of occasions, Heffernan won one Railway Cup medal in 1989. At club level he is a one-time All-Ireland medallist with Glenmore. In addition to this he also won two Leinster medals and five championship medals. He also captained the Glenmore Senior Football team to victory in the 1989 county final, also winning man of the match by scoring 5 points from the middle of the field.

Throughout his career Heffernan made 32 championship appearances. He retired from inter-county hurling following the conclusion of the 1993 championship.

Heffernan is widely regarded as one of Kilkenny's all-time greatest players. During his playing days he won one All-Star award, while he was later chosen at full-forward on the Kilkenny Hurling Team of the Century.

== Playing career ==
=== Club ===
Heffernan played his club hurling with his local Glenmore club. He enjoyed much success with the club and won his first senior county title as captain in 1987. Heffernan won a second county medal in 1990 and this was quickly converted into a Leinster club title. Glenmore later defeated Patrickswell in the All-Ireland final, with Heffernan scoring the winning goal in the 33rd minute. In 1992 Heffernan won his third county medal. 1995 saw Glenmore winning a fourth county title which was subsequently converted into a second Leinster club title for Heffernan.

=== Inter-county ===
Heffernan first came to prominence on the inter-county scene in the early 1980s. He was a member of the Kilkenny senior hurling team that won the National Hurling League in 1982 and later collected his first Leinster title. Heffernan subsequently won his first All-Ireland medal as Kilkenny defeated Cork in the championship decider. The following year Heffernan won his second National League title before winning his second Leinster title. He later won his second consecutive All-Ireland medal following a second consecutive defeat of Cork in the final. Kilkenny lost their provincial crown for the following few years, however, Heffernan won a third National League medal and a third Leinster medal in 1986, however, 'the Cats' were beaten in the All-Ireland semi-final.

In 1987 Heffernan won his fourth Leinster title, however, Kilkenny went on to lose the All-Ireland final to Galway. Heffernan's side took a back seat to Offaly for the next few years in the Leinster Championship, however, he did win a forth National League title in 1990. In 1991 Heffernan was appointed captain of the Kilkenny hurling team. That year he won a fifth Leinster medal, however, his side were subsequently defeated by Tipperary in the All-Ireland final. 1992 saw Heffernan add a sixth provincial title to his collection and he later claimed a third All-Ireland medal when he came on as a substitute in Kilkenny's defeat of Cork in the All-Ireland final. In 1993 he collected a seventh Leinster title before once again coming on as a substitute to claim a fourth All-Ireland medal in Kilkenny's defeat of Galway in the All-Ireland final.

== Career statistics ==
Team	Year	National League			Leinster		All-Ireland		Total	
Team	Year	Division	Apps	Score	Apps	Score	Apps	Score	Apps	Score
Kilkenny	1979-80	Division 1A	x	4-05	x	0-00	—		x	4-05
Kilkenny	1980-81	Division 1B	x	1-02	1	0-01	—		x	1-03
Kilkenny	1981-82	Division 1B	10	13-07	2	1-03	2	2-06	14	16-16
Kilkenny	1982-83	Division 1	11	11-11	2	2-02	1	0-01	14	13-14
Kilkenny	1983-84	Division 1	x	2-09	2	2-02	—		x	4-11
Kilkenny	1984-85	Division 1	x	2-09	x	1-00	—		x	3-09
Kilkenny	1985-86	Division 1	x	1-04	x	0-02	x	0-00	x	1-06
Kilkenny	1986-87	Division 1	x	1-03	3	2-09	2	0-01	x	3-13
Kilkenny	1987-88	Division 1	x	2-02	x	0-00	—		x	2-02
Kilkenny	1988-89	Division 1	x	0-12	3	4-02	—		x	4-14
Kilkenny	1989-90	Division 1	x	0-06	x	0-00	—		x	0-06
Kilkenny	1990-91	Division 1	x	3-06	x	x-xx	2	0-01	x	3-07
Kilkenny	1991-92	Division 1	x	x-xx	2	1-02	2	0-02	0	1-04
Kilkenny	1992-93	Division 1	x	0-00	x	0-00	x	0-00	x	0-00
Career total			x	40-76	x	13-23	x	2-11	x	55-110

Sporting positions
Preceded by Seán Fennelly	Kilkenny Senior Hurling Captain; 1991	Succeeded by Liam Fennelly
