= Luke Connellan =

Irish hurler (born 2003)

Personal information
- Born: 2003 (age 22–23) Thomastown, County Kilkenny, Ireland
- Occupation: Student

Sport
- Sport: Hurling
- Position: Right wing-forward
Club
- Years: Club
- Thomastown
Club titles
- Kilkenny titles: 1
College
- Years: College
- 2023-present: University College Dublin
College titles
- Fitzgibbon titles: 0
Inter-county
- Years: County
- 2025-: Kilkenny
Inter-county titles
- Leinster titles: 1
- All-Irelands: 0
- NHL: 0
- All Stars: 0

Luke Connellan (born 2003) is an Irish hurler. At club level, he plays with Thomastown and at inter-county level with the Kilkenny senior hurling team.

== Career ==
Connellan played hurling while attending secondary school at St Kieran's College in Kilkenny. As a member of the school's senior hurling team, he lined out in the 1–17 to 0–15 defeat by Ardscoil Rís, Limerick in the 2022 All-Ireland PPS SAHC final. At third-level, Connellan lined out with University College Dublin in the Fitzgibbon Cup.

At club level, Connellan first played for Thomastown at juvenile and underage levels, winning a Kilkenny U21AHC title in 2022. He won Kilkenny IHC and Leinster Club IHC medals in 2023. Connellan scored two points when Thomastown beat Castlelyons by 2–23 to 0–13 in the 2024 All-Ireland Club IHC final. He also added a Kilkenny SHC medal to collection in 2024 after an 0–18 to 0–07 defeat of O'Loughlin Gaels.

At inter-county level, Connellan first played for Kilkenny as part of the under-20 team in 2023. He was drafted onto the senior team in advance of the 2025 season. Connellan won a Leinster SHC medal as a non-playing substitute in 2025.

== Honours ==
Thomastown

- Kilkenny Senior Hurling Championship: 2024
- All-Ireland Intermediate Club Hurling Championship: 2024
- Leinster Intermediate Club Hurling Championship: 2023
- Kilkenny Intermediate Hurling Championship: 2023
- Kilkenny Under-21 A Hurling Championship: 2019
- Kilkenny Minor A Hurling Championship: 2017

Kilkenny

- Leinster Senior Hurling Championship: 2025
