= Stephen Donnelly (hurler) =

Irish hurler (born 2000)

Personal information
- Native name: Stíofán Ó Donnaile (Irish)
- Born: 2000 (age 25–26) Thomastown, County Kilkenny, Ireland
- Occupation: Electrician

Sport
- Sport: Hurling
- Position: Right corner-forward
Club
- Years: Club
- 2018-present: Thomastown
Club titles
| | Football | Hurling |
| Kilkenny titles | 1 | 1 |
Inter-county
- Years: County
- 2022; 2025-: Kilkenny
Inter-county titles
- Leinster titles: 0
- All-Irelands: 0
- NHL: 0
- All Stars: 0

Stephen Donnelly (born 2000) is an Irish hurler. At club level he plays with Thomastown and at inter-county level with the Kilkenny senior hurling team.

== Career ==
Donnelly first played hurling and Gaelic football at club level with Thomastown. He claimed his first silverware at adult level when Thomastown won the Kilkenny SFC title after a defeat of Mullinavat in 2021. Donnelly added a Kilkenny IHC medal to his collection in 2023, when he captained the team to the title after a 1–29 to 0–17 defeat of Mooncoin in the final. He ended that year's club season by captaining Thomastown to a 2–23 to 0–13 defeat of Castlelyons in the 2024 All-Ireland club final. Donnelly won a Kilkenny SHC medal in 2024, following a defeat of O'Loughlin Gaels.

At inter-county level, Donnelly spent two years with Kilkenny's under-20 team. He was part of the team that won the Leinster U20HC title after a 1–17 to 0–18 win over Wexford in 2019. Donnelly was added to the senior team for the pre-season Walsh Cup competition in 2022.

Donnelly returned to the senior team in February 2025.

== Honours ==
Thomastown

- Kilkenny Senior Hurling Championship: 2024
- Kilkenny Senior Football Championship: 2021
- All-Ireland Intermediate Club Hurling Championship: 2024 (c)
- Leinster Intermediate Club Hurling Championship: 2023 (c)
- Kilkenny Intermediate Hurling Championship: 2023 (c)

Kilkenny

- Leinster Under-20 Hurling Championship: 2019

Achievements
| Preceded by Lorcan Lyons | All-Ireland Club IHC final winning captain 2024 | Succeeded by Seán Desmond |
