= 2024 Kilkenny Senior Hurling League =

- Dates: August 02 – September 15, 2024
- Teams: 12
- Sponsor: St. Canice's Credit Union
- Champions: O'Loughlin Gaels (2nd title)
- Runners-up: Tullaroan

The 2024 Kilkenny Senior Hurling League was the 31st staging of the competition since its establishment by the Kilkenny County Board in 1992.

The league competition consisted of 12 teams divided into two groups of six and ran from August 2 to September 15, 2024.

The first-placed team in each group qualified for the league final in which O'Loughlin Gaels defeated Tullaroan by 4–24 to 1–18 at UPMC Nowlan Park on September 15, 2024. It was the club's second league title.

The second-placed team in each group qualified to compete for a subsidiary title, the shield final, in which Mullinavat defeated Thomastown by 1–25 to 1–19.

== Results ==
=== Group Stage ===
==== Group A Table ====
| Team | P | W | D | L | F | A | +/- | Pts | Qualification | |
|---|---|---|---|---|---|---|---|---|---|---|
| Tullaroan | 5 | 4 | 0 | 1 | 127 | 111 | 16 | 8 | league final | championship quarter-final |
| Thomastown | 5 | 3 | 0 | 2 | 115 | 105 | 10 | 6 | shield final | championship quarter-final |
| Bennettsbridge | 5 | 3 | 0 | 2 | 128 | 105 | 23 | 6 | championship round 1 | |
| Dicksboro | 5 | 2 | 1 | 2 | 109 | 108 | 1 | 5 | championship round 1 | |
| Glenmore | 5 | 1 | 1 | 3 | 95 | 123 | -28 | 3 | championship round 1 | |
| James Stephens | 5 | 1 | 0 | 4 | 109 | 131 | -22 | 2 | championship round 1 | |

==== Group A Results ====
Round 1

| August 2, 2024; Group A Round 1 | Dicksboro | 1–19 3–16 | Tullaroan | Kilmanagh; Referee: O Beehan |

| August 3, 2024; Group A Round 1 | Thomastown | 1–23 0–20 | James Stephens | Bennettsbridge; Referee: S Cleere |

| August 4, 2024; Group A Round 1 | Glenmore | 0–13 2–23 | Bennettsbridge | Inistioge; Referee: J O'Dwyer |

Round 2

| August 9, 2024; Group A Round 2 | Bennettsbridge | 2–15 1–22 | Thomastown | Kilmanagh; Referee: C Everard |

| August 10, 2024; Group A Round 2 | Tullaroan | 4–16 0–20 | Glenmore | Clara; Referee: P O’ Reilly |

| August 10, 2024; Group A Round 2 | James Stephens | 0–21 2–17 | Dicksboro | St John's Park; Referee: S Delaney |

Round 3

| August 23, 2024; Group A Round 3 | Bennettsbridge | 5–19 1–18 | James Stephens | Danesfort; Referee: C Everard |

| August 25, 2024; Group A Round 3 | Glenmore | 1–18 0–21 | Dicksboro | Graignamanagh; Referee: P O’ Reilly |

| August 25, 2024; Group A Round 3 | Tullaroan | 0–18 0–25 | Thomastown | Clara; Referee: P Bowden |

Round 4

| August 31, 2024; Group A Round 4 | Thomastown | 0–21 0–22 | Glenmore | Mullinavat; Referee: J O’ Dwyer |

| August 31, 2024; Group A Round 4 | Dicksboro | 0–19 2–17 | Bennettsbridge | Gowran; Referee: P O’ Reilly |

| August 31, 2024; Group A Round 4 | James Stephens | 1–20 3–20 | Tullaroan | Castlecomer; Referee: P Burke |

Round 5

| September 7, 2024; Group A Round 5 | Dicksboro | 0–24 1–15 | Thomastown | Gowran; Referee: S Cleere |

| September 7, 2024; Group A Round 5 | Glenmore | 1–16 1–21 | James Stephens | Hugginstown; Referee: D Hughes |

| September 7, 2024; Group A Round 5 | Tullaroan | 1–24 1–18 | Bennettsbridge | Muckalee; Referee: B Fox |

==== Group B Table ====
| Team | P | W | D | L | F | A | +/- | Pts | Qualification | |
|---|---|---|---|---|---|---|---|---|---|---|
| O'Loughlin Gaels | 5 | 5 | 0 | 0 | 159 | 78 | 81 | 10 | league final | championship quarter-final |
| Mullinavat | 5 | 3 | 1 | 1 | 95 | 96 | -1 | 7 | shield final | championship quarter-final |
| Graigue-Ballycallan | 5 | 3 | 1 | 1 | 104 | 111 | -7 | 7 | championship round 1 | |
| Clara | 5 | 2 | 0 | 3 | 108 | 113 | -5 | 4 | championship round 1 | |
| Ballyhale Shamrocks | 5 | 1 | 0 | 4 | 116 | 128 | -12 | 2 | championship round 1 | |
| Erin's Own | 5 | 0 | 0 | 5 | 85 | 141 | -56 | 0 | championship round 1 | |

==== Group B Results ====
Round 1

| August 3, 2024; Group B Round 1 | O'Loughlin Gaels | 3–22 1–19 | Clara | Gowran; Referee: P Burke |

| August 3, 2024; Group B Round 1 | Erin's Own | 1–13 0–21 | Mullinavat | Callan; Referee: E Hayes |

| August 3, 2024; Group B Round 1 | Graigue-Ballycallan | 1–22 2–13 | Ballyhale Shamrocks | Dunnamaggin; Referee: B Fox |

Round 2

| August 11, 2024; Group B Round 2 | Ballyhale Shamrocks | 1–28 0–19 | Erin's Own | Palmerstown; Referee: R Holland |

| August 11, 2024; Group B Round 2 | Clara | 0–17 1–18 | Graigue-Ballycallan | Pairc Sheamuis Stiopháin; Referee: E Maher |

| August 11, 2024; Group B Round 2 | Mullinavat | 0–9 2–18 | O'Loughlin Gaels | Thomastown; Referee: D Hughes |

Round 3

| August 24, 2024; Group B Round 3 | O'Loughlin Gaels | 2–33 1–8 | Erin's Own | Ballyragget; Referee: G Quilty |

| August 24, 2024; Group B Round 3 | Clara | 4–17 2–17 | Ballyhale Shamrocks | Thomastown; Referee: E Hayes |

| August 25, 2024; Group B Round 3 | Mullinavat | 1–13 0–16 | Graigue-Ballycallan | Dunnamaggin; Referee: E Larkin |

Round 4

| August 31, 2024; Group B Round 4 | Erin's Own | 2–12 1–20 | Clara | Jenkinstown; Referee: S Cleere |

| August 31, 2024; Group B Round 4 | Graigue-Ballycallan | 1–12 3–29 | O'Loughlin Gaels | Callan; Referee: M Flynn |

| August 31, 2024; Group B Round 4 | Mullinavat | 3–20 2–16 | Ballyhale Shamrocks | Mullinavat; Referee: G Quilty |

Round 5

| September 7, 2024; Group B Round 5 | Mullinavat | 1–17 2–11 | Clara | Dunnamaggin; Referee: R Holland |

| September 7, 2024; Group B Round 5 | O'Loughlin Gaels | 1–23 1–18 | Ballyhale Shamrocks | Callan; Referee: C Everard |

| September 7, 2024; Group B Round 5 | Erin's Own | 2–15 1–24 | Graigue-Ballycallan | Urlingford; Referee: P Burke |

=== Knockout Stage ===
==== Shield Final ====
| September 15, 2024; Shield Final | Mullinavat | 1–25 1–19 | Thomastown | Nowlan Park; Referee: E Larkin |

==== League Final ====
| September 15, 2024; League Final | O'Loughlin Gaels | 4–24 1–18 | Tullaroan | Nowlan Park; Referee: E Maher |
