= Peter Prendergast (hurler) =

Irish hurler

Personal information
- Native name: Peadar de Priondragás (Irish)
- Born: 1924 Thomastown, County Kilkenny, Ireland
- Died: 14 July 1991 (aged 67) Dublin, Ireland
- Height: 5 ft 11 in (180 cm)

Sport
- Sport: Hurling
- Position: Centre-back
Club
- Years: Club
- Thomastown
Club titles
- Kilkenny titles: 1
Inter-county
- Years: County
- 1947-1952: Kilkenny
Inter-county titles
- Leinster titles: 2
- All-Irelands: 1
- NHL: 0

Peter Prendergast (1924 - 14 July 1991) was an Irish hurler who played as a centre-back for the Kilkenny senior team.

Born in Thomastown, County Kilkenny, Prendergast first arrived on the inter-county scene when he first linked up with the Kilkenny senior team, making his debut in the 1947 championship. Prendergast was a regular member of the team over the next few years. During that time he won one All-Ireland medal and two Leinster medals. He was an All-Ireland runner-up on one occasion.

Prendergast also represented the Leinster inter-provincial team, however, he never won a Railway Cup medal. At club level he won one championship medal with Thomastown.

== Honours ==
=== Team ===
Thomastown

- Kilkenny Senior Hurling Championship (1): 1946

Kilkenny

- All-Ireland Senior Hurling Championship (1): 1947
- Leinster Senior Hurling Championship (2): 1947 1950
