= Mick Brennan (hurler) =

Irish hurler

Personal information
- Native name: Mícheál Ó Braonáin (Irish)
- Nickname: Cloney
- Born: Moneenroe, County Kilkenny

Sport
- Sport: Hurling
- Position: Forward
Clubs
- Years: Club
- Railyard (football), Erin's Own (hurling)
Inter-county
Years	County	Apps (scores)
1971–1982	Kilkenny	29 (8–156)
Inter-county titles
- Leinster titles: 7
- All-Irelands: 3
- All Stars: 3

Mick "Cloney" Brennan (born 16 March 1950) is a retired Irish sportsman. He played hurling with Erin's Own and Gaelic Football with his local club Railyard and was a member of the Kilkenny senior inter-county team in the 1970s and 1980s. He was named an All Star in 1975, 1976, and 1979.
