= Kilkenny Senior Football Championship =

Annual Gaelic football competition

- Irish: Craobh Peile Sinsearach Chill Chainnigh
- Code: Gaelic football
- Founded: 1887; 139 years ago
- Region: Kilkenny (GAA)
- No. of teams: 13
- Title holders: Mullinavat (9th title)
- Most titles: Railyard (22 titles)
- Sponsors: J. J. Kavanagh & Sons
- Official website: Kilkenny GAA

The Kilkenny Senior Football Championship (known for sponsorship reasons as the J. J. Kavanagh & Sons Senior Football Championship and abbreviated to the Kilkenny SFC) is an annual club Gaelic football competition organised by the Kilkenny County Board of the Gaelic Athletic Association and contested by the top-ranking senior clubs in the county of Kilkenny in Ireland. It is the most prestigious competition in Kilkenny Gaelic football.

Introduced in 1887 as the Kilkenny Football Championship, it was initially a straight knockout tournament open only to senior-ranking club teams. The championship has gone through a number of changes throughout the years, including the use of a round robin, before reverting to a straight knockout format.

In its current format, the Kilkenny Senior Championship begins in April with a first round series of games comprising ten teams, while the three remaining teams receive byes to the quarter-final stage. A team's finishing position in the Kilkenny Senior Football League determines at what stage they enter the championship. Four rounds of games are played, culminating with the final match at Nowlan Park. The winner of the Kilkenny Senior Championship qualifies for the subsequent Leinster Intermediate Club Championship.

The competition has been won by 35 teams, 18 of which have won it more than once. Railyard is the most successful team in the tournament's history, having won it 22 times. Mullinavat are the 2026 champions, having beaten Tullogher-Rosbercon by 1–15 to 0–11

== Format ==
=== Overview ===
The Kilkenny County Championship is a single elimination tournament. Each team is afforded just one defeat before being eliminated from the championship. Pairings for matches are drawn at random, however, there is a certain level of seeding based on league performance. The four top-ranking teams receive a bye into the quarter-finals.

=== Current format ===
First round: 10 teams contest this round. The 5 winning teams advance directly to the quarter-final stage. The 5 losing teams are eliminated from the championship. The lower-ranked teams from the league advance to a relegation playoff.

Quarter-finals: Eight teams contest this round. The four winning teams advance directly to the semi-final stage. The four losing teams are eliminated from the championship.

Semi-finals: Four teams contest this round. The two winning teams advance directly to the final. The two losing teams are eliminated from the championship.

Final: The final is contested by the two semi-final winners.

== Teams ==
=== Participating teams ===
The following 13 teams will participate in the 2027 championship:

Team	Location	Colours
Lisdowney	Lisdowney	Blue and white
Conahy Shamrocks	Jenkinstown	Black and amber
Dicksboro	Palmerstown	Maroon and white
Glenmore	Glenmore	Green and Gold
James Stephens	Larchfield	Red and green
Kilmoganny	Kilmoganny	Yellow and green
Mooncoin	Mooncoin	Green and white
Mullinavat	Mullinavat	Black and white
O'Loughlin Gaels	Hebron Road	Green and white
Muckalee	Muckalee	Green and yellow
Railyard	Moneenroe	Red and white
Thomastown	Thomastown	Blue and white
Tullogher–Rosbercon	Tullogher	Black and amber

== Wins listed by club ==
#	Club	Wins	Years won
1	Railyard	22	1951, 1952, 1953, 1957, 1958, 1959, 1960, 1961, 1965, 1966, 1967, 1969, 1970, 1971, 1972, 1973, 1978, 1992, 1999, 2014, 2015, 2016
2	Glenmore	20	1906, 1915, 1916, 1920, 1922, 1923, 1924, 1929, 1938, 1939, 1940, 1942, 1943, 1949, 1950, 1954, 1955, 1989, 1998, 2009
3	Muckalee	12	1968, 1975, 1977, 1987, 1990, 2001, 2004, 2005, 2010, 2011, 2012, 2013
4	Mullinavat	9	2007, 2017, 2018, 2019, 2020, 2022, 2023, 2025, 2026
5	Tullogher	8	1930, 1931, 1934, 1936, 1937, 1941, 1944, 1962
5	James Stephens	8	1976, 1988, 1991, 1993, 1995, 1996, 2003, 2008
7	Thomastown	5	1981, 1983, 1984, 1985, 2021
8	Commercials (City)	4	1890, 1893, 1894, 1895
8	Knocktopher	4	1901, 1908, 1910, 1911
8	Lamogue	4	1902, 1903, 1904, 1905
11	Slatequarry Miners	3	1900, 1907, 1913
11	Ballyhale Shamrocks	3	1979, 1980, 1982
11	Dicksboro	3	1994, 1997, 2024
14	Kilmacow	2	1887, 1888
14	Coolagh	2	1914, 1919
14	St John's	2	1946, 1948
14	Clann na Gael (City)	2	1963, 1964
14	Erin's Own	2	2002, 2006
18	Ballyhale	1	1889
18	Sevenhouses	1	1896
18	Green Rovers (City)	1	1897
18	Callan '98 Volunteers	1	1898
18	City Rangers	1	1899
18	Coolroe	1	1909
18	Ye Faire City	1	1925
18	Cotterstown	1	1926
18	Owen Roes (Army)	1	1928
18	Black & Whites	1	1932
18	Moneenroe	1	1933
18	Barrow Rovers (Glenmore-Slieverue)	1	1935
18	Northern Junior Selection	1	1945
18	Sarsfields (Conahy)	1	1947
18	Graiguenamanagh	1	1956
18	St Kieran's (Mooncoin-Kilmacow)	1	1974
18	Mooncoin	1	1986
18	Kilmoganny	1	2000

== Finals listed by year ==
Year	Winner	Score	Opponent	Score
2026	Mullinavat	1-15	Tullogher–Rosbercon	0-11
2025	Mullinavat	1-21	Mooncoin	0-14
2024	Dicksboro	1-09	Lisdowney	1-06
2023	Mullinavat	3-07	Thomastown	1-09
2022	Mullinavat	1-12	Thomastown	0-08
2021	Thomastown	2-06	Mullinavat	1-05
2020	Mullinavat	5-07	Mooncoin	1-04
2019	Mullinavat	1-13 R (1-07)	Railyard	0-10 R (1-07)
2018	Mullinavat	5-11	Muckalee	2-09
2017	Mullinavat	3-12	Railyard	2-05
2016	Railyard	1-08	Kilmoganny	2-03
2015	Railyard	2-08 R (0-08) D	Muckalee	1-09 R (1-05) D
2014	Railyard	1-05	Muckalee	1-04
2013	Muckalee	2-10	James Stephens	1-09
2012	Muckalee	1-10	Mullinavat	0-07
2011	Muckalee	0-06	Kilmoganny	0-04
2010	Muckalee	1-10	Glenmore	1-07
2009	Glenmore	2-07	Muckalee	0-10
2008	James Stephens	1-09	Erin's Own	1-08
2007	Mullinavat	0-09, 3-07 (R)	Glenmore	1-06, 0-11 (R)
2006	Erin's Own	1-05	Mullinavat	1-03
2005	Muckalee	3-10	Railyard	0-09
2004	Muckalee	0-10, 0-09 (R)	Erin's Own	1-07, 0-07 (R)
2003	James Stephens	2-07	O'Loughlin Gaels	0-06
2002	Erin's Own	1-08	James Stephens	0-08
2001	Muckalee	2-07, 1-11 (R)	Erin's Own	1-10, 0-09 (R)
2000	Kilmoganny	0-07, 2-11 (R)	Dicksboro	0-07, 1-09 (R)
1999	Railyard	1-05	Graigue-Ballycallan	0-07
1998*	Glenmore	0-09	James Stephens	0-09
1997	Dicksboro	0-11	James Stephens	0-08
1996	James Stephens	0-12	Kilmoganny	2-04
1995	James Stephens	0-11, 2-12 (R)	Dicksboro	1-08, 1-11 (R)
1994	Dicksboro	0-09	Ballyhale Shamrocks	0-06
1993	James Stephens	1-07, 4-10 (R)	Railyard	0-10, 0-07 (R)
1992	Railyard	0-11	James Stephens	0-08
1991	James Stephens	1-09	Railyard	1-07
1990	Muckalee	1-11	Glenmore	0-04
1989	Glenmore	0-11	Railyard	1-05
1988	James Stephens	1-06, 0-07 (R)	Railyard	1-06, 0-04 (R)
1987	Muckalee	0-06	Railyard	0-05
1986	Mooncoin	1-06, 0-09 (R)	James Stephens	1-06, 0-07 (R)
1985	Thomastown	5-03	Railyard	1-05
1984	Thomastown	1-09	Railyard	0-04
1983	Thomastown	1-05	Railyard	1-02
1982	Ballyhale Shamrocks	0-06, 0-07 (R)	Thomastown	0-06, 0-02 (R)
1981	Thomastown	2-06	Muckalee	0-06
1980	Ballyhale Shamrocks	4-07	Muckalee	1-01
1979	Ballyhale Shamrocks	0-12	The Gaels (City)	0-04
1978	Railyard	2-06	James Stephens	0-07
1977	Muckalee	W/O	James Stephens	Scr.
1976	James Stephens	1-09	Railyard	0-06
1975	Muckalee	0-04, 0-09 (R)	James Stephens	0-04, 0-03 (R)
1974	St Kieran's (Mooncoin-Kilmacow)	0-07	Muckalee	0-02
1973	Railyard	0-09	Glenmore	0-03
1972	Railyard	2-10	Clann na Gael	0-09
1971	Railyard	3-10	Thomastown	0-03
1970	Railyard	0-08	Muckalee	0-04
1969	Railyard	0-11	Mooncoin	0-06
1968	Muckalee	1-09	James Stephens	1-03
1967	Railyard	3-05	Clan na Gael	1-02
1966	Railyard	1-11	James Stephens	2-05
1965	Railyard	W/O	Tullogher	Scr.
1964	Clann na Gael	2=-3, 3-03 (R)	Lamogue	1-06, 0-04 (R)
1963	Clann na Gael	1-06	Lamogue	0-02
1962	Tullogher	1-07	Muckalee	0-02
1961	Railyard	1-07	Graigue	0-02
1960	Railyard	5-11	Clara	1-02
1959	Railyard	4-07	St Niochlas	2-03
1958	Railyard	3-07	St Niochlas	1-05
1957*	Railyard	3-06	St Niochlas	2-04
1956	Graiguenamanagh	1-06, 1-03 (R)	Glenmore	1-06, 1-01 (R)
1955	Glenmore	2-04	Railyard	0-05
1954	Glenmore	2-03	Railyard	0-04
1953	Railyard	1-04	Cotterstown	0-03
1952	Railyard	2-08	St John's	0-04
1951	Railyard	2-05	Glenmore	2-02
1950	Glenmore	0-05	St John's	1-01
1949	Glenmore	1-06	Tullogher	1-00
1948*	St John's	1-07, 0-04 (1R), 2-04 (2nd R)	Sarsfields (Conahy)	0-04, 1-01 (1R), 0-02 (2nd R)
1947	Sarsfields (Conahy)	0-03, 2-02 (R)	Glenmore	0-03, 1-03 (R)
1946	St John's	1-07	Glenmore	1-01
1945	Northern Juniors	1-4	Glenmore	1-03
1944	Tullogher	2-07	Coolagh	1-02
1943	Glenmore	2-06	Carrickshock	0-01
1942	Glenmore	3-04	Tullogher	0-00
1941	Tullogher	2-08	The Rower	0-01
1940*	Glenmore	2-00	Sarsfields (Conahy)	2-03
1939	Glenmore	1-03	Tullogher	1-02
1938	Glenmore	1-02	Tullogher	0-02
1937	Tullogher	2-05	Glenmore	2-00
1936	Tullogher	1-05	Black & Whites	1-03
1935	Barrow Rovers (Glenmore/Slieverue)	0-05	Mullinavat	0-03
1934	Tullogher	1-04	Mullinavat	0-01
1933	Moneenroe	0-05	Glenmore	0-02
1932	Black & Whites	0-04	O'Loughlin Gaels	1-01
1931*	Tullogher			
1930	Tullogher	0-06	Glenmore	0-02
1929	Glenmore	0-03	Cotterstown	0-01
1928	Owen Roes (Army)	2-05	Glenmore	1-02
1927*	No Championship			
1926	Cotterstown	1-06	Barrow Rovers (Tullogher)	0-02
1925	Ye Faire Citie	0-02, 3-03 (R)	Cotterstown	0-02, 0-03 (R)
1924	Glenmore	3-01	Barrow Rovers (Tullogher)	0-00
1923	Glenmore	2-07	Cloneen	0-02
1922	Glenmore	W/O	Cotterstown	Scr.
1921	No Championship			
1920*	Glenmore	1-05, 2-06 (R)	Cloneen	1-03, 0-03 (R)
1919	Coolagh W/O	Glenmore Scr.		
1918	No Championship			
1917	No Championship			
1916	Glenmore	1-00	Coolroe	0-00
1915	Glenmore	1-01, 1-00 (R) 1-03 (2R), 1-00 (3R)	Coolagh	1-01, 1-00 (R), 2-00 (2R), 0-02 (3R)
1914	Coolagh	0-03	Knocktopher	0-02
1913	Slatequarry Miners	1-00	Clogh	0-00
1912	No Championship			
1911	Knocktopher	0-04	Clogh	0-01
1910*	Knocktopher	0-02	Slatequarry Miners	0-03
1909	Coolroe	0-06	Clodiagh	0-02
1908	Knocktopher	0-03	Slatequarry Miners	0-02
1907	Slatequarry Miners	0-07	Knocktopher	0-04
1906	Glenmore	2-02	Kells	1-02
1905	Lamogue		Harristown	
1904	Lamogue		Mullinavat	
1903	Lamogue	3-08	Tullogher	0-00
1902	Lamogue	0-08	Tullogher	0-07
1901*	Knocktopher	0-06, 0-05 (R)	Green & Whites (The Rower)	0-06, 0-02 (R)
1900	Slatequarry Miners	0-12	City Rangers	1-02
1899	City Rangers	2-08	Knocktopher	2-07
1898	Callan '98 Volunteers		Slatequarry Miners	
1897	Green Rovers (City)	1-09	City Rangers	0-02
1896	Seven Houses	1-07	Callan	0-05
1895	Commercials (City)	W/O	Callan	Scr.
1894	Commercials (City)	2-02	Callan	0-01
1893	Commercials (City)	1-01	Callan	0-00
1892	No Championship			
1891	No Championship			
1890	Commercials (City)	1-00	Ballyhale	0-01
1889*	Ballyhale		Kells	
1888	Kilmacow	0-03	Thomas Larkins (City)	0-00
1887	Kilmacow	0-02, 1-03 (R)	Kilkenny	0-02, 0-00 (R)

- 1998 No replay - Glenmore won in a replay
- 1957 - Unfinished - Railyard awarded tit;e
- 1948 - Reply ordered after objection
- 1940 Glenmore awarded title on objection
- 1931 Played on a league basis
- 1927 Glenmore 1-02, Cotterstown 0-02 Declared null & void
- 1911 Knocktopher awarded title after an objection
- 1920 Reply ordered following an objection
- 1901 Unfinished. Rower claimed they scored a goal. Knocktopher awarded match.
- 1889 Kells 3-05, Thomas Larkins 0-02; This was declared not the final and Ballyhale was allowed back in championship. Kells refused to play them, and Ballyhale awarded title

== Records ==
=== Teams ===
==== By decade ====
The most successful team of each decade, judged by number of Kilkenny Senior Football Championship titles, is as follows:

- 1880s: 2 for Kilmacow (1887–88)
- 1890s: 4 for Commercials (1890-93-94-95)
- 1900s: 4 for Lamogue (1902-03-04-05)
- 1910s: 2 each for Knocktopher (1910-11), Coolagh (1914-19) and Glenmore (1915-16)
- 1920s: 5 for Glenmore (1920-22-23-24-29)
- 1930s: 5 for Tullogher (1930-31-34-36-37)
- 1940s: 4 for Glenmore (1940-42-43-49)
- 1950s: 6 for Railyard (1951-52-53-57-58-59)
- 1960s: 6 for Railyard (1960-61-65-66-67-69)
- 1970s: 5 for Railyard (1970-71-72-73-78)
- 1980s: 4 for Thomastown (1981-83-84-85)
- 1990s: 4 for James Stephens (1991-93-95-96)
- 2000s: 3 for Muckalee (2001-04-05)
- 2010s: 4 for Muckalee (2010-11-12-13)
- 2020s: 5 for Mullinavat (2020-22-23-25-26)

==== Most consecutive wins ====
#	Wins	Club	Years won
1st	5	Railyard	1957, 1958, 1959, 1960, 1961
1st	5	Railyard	1969, 1970, 1971, 1972, 1973
2nd	4	Lamogue	1902, 1903, 1904, 1905
2nd	4	Muckalee	2010, 2011, 2012, 2013
2nd	4	Mullinavat	2017, 2018, 2019, 2020

==== Gaps/wins ====
Top three longest gaps between championship titles:

- 36 years: Thomastown (1985-2021)
- 34 years: Glenmore (1955-1989)
- 27 years: Dicksboro (1997-2024)
- 18 years: Tullogher (1944-1962)

== Winners and finalists ==
=== The Double ===
Two teams have won the Kilkenny Senior Football Championship and the Kilkenny Senior Hurling Championship in a single year as part of a Gaelic football-hurling double. James Stephens became the first team to win the double in 1976, having won the All-Ireland Club SHC title earlier that year. Ballyhale Shamrocks won their own double in 1979, before repeating the feat in 1980 and 1982.

Dicksboro, Erin's Own, Glenmore, Mooncoin and Thomastown also hold the distinction of being dual county senior championship-winning teams, however, these were not achieved in a single calendar season. Muckalee and their sister club St. Martin's have also achieved the double.
