= 1999 Kilkenny Intermediate Hurling Championship =

- Teams: 12
- Sponsor: Vale Oil
- Champions: John Locke's (3rd title); Declan Roche (captain)
- Runners-up: Mullinavat

The 1999 Kilkenny Intermediate Hurling Championship was the 35th staging of the Kilkenny Intermediate Hurling Championship since its establishment by the Kilkenny County Board in 1929.

The final was played on 31 October 1999 at Nowlan Park in Kilkenny, between John Locke's and Mullinavat, in what was their first ever meeting in the final. John Locke's won the match by 0–15 to 1–09 to claim their third championship title overall and a first championship title in six years.

== Results ==
=== Final ===
31 October 1999 Final	John Locke's	0-15 - 1-09	Mullinavat	Nowlan Park
	D Lynch 0-4, R Jackman 0-2, PJ Coady 0-2, J Power 0-2, L Egan 0-1, D Roche 0-1, JP Corcoran 0-1, D Maher 0-1, A Power 0-1.		M Dunphy 0-6, R Carroll 1-0, Maurice Murphy 0-2, Michael Murphy 0-1.
