= Cha Whelan =

Irish hurler

Jarlath Whelan
Personal information
- Native name: Jarlath Ó Faoileáin (Irish)
- Nickname: Cha
- Born: 7 September 1939 Thomastown, County Kilkenny, Ireland
- Died: 22 March 1996 (aged 56) Kilkenny, Ireland
- Occupation: Tarmacadam contractor

Sport
- Sport: Hurling
- Position: Full-back
Clubs
- Years: Club
- Thomastown; Faughs; Seán McDermott's
Club titles
- London titles: 1
Inter-county
- Years: County
- 1961-1967: Kilkenny
Inter-county titles
- Leinster titles: 1
- All-Irelands: 1
- NHL: 0

Jarlath "Cha" Whelan (7 September 1939 – 22 March 1996) was an Irish hurler who played as a full-back for the Kilkenny and London senior teams.

Born in Thomastown, County Kilkenny, Whelan first played hurling during his school days. Although never playing minor hurling at inter-county level, he arrived on the inter-county scene at the age of twenty-one when he made his senior debut in the 1960-61 National Hurling League. Whelan later played with London, but returned to Kilkenny and made several cameo appearances over the following four years, winning one All-Ireland medal and one Leinster medal on the field of play.

At club level Whelan began and ended his career with Thomastown. He also played with Faughs in Dublin and won one championship medal with Seán McDermott's in London.

Whelan retired from inter-county hurling after winning a second All-Ireland medal as a non-playing substitute in the 1967 championship.
