= Paudie =

Paudie is a given name. Notable people with the name include:

- Paudie Butler (born 1950), Irish retired hurler and Gaelic footballer
- Paudie Coffey (born 1969), Irish Fine Gael politician who has served as a Senator since May 2016
- Paudie Fitzgerald (1933–2020), Irish cyclist
- Paudie Fitzmaurice (born 1949), successful hurler from Killeedy in County Limerick, Ireland
- Paudie Kehoe (born 1990), Irish hurler who plays as a left corner-forward
- Paudie Kissane (born 1980), Irish Gaelic footballer
- Paudie Lannon (born 1956), Irish retired hurler who played as a midfielder
- Paudie Lynch (born 1952), former Irish Gaelic footballer
- Paudie Mulhaire (born 1976), Irish sportsperson
- Paudie O'Brien (born 1989), Irish hurler who currently plays as a midfielder
- Paudie O'Donoghue (1944–2008), Irish sportsperson
- Paudie O'Dwyer (born 1982), Irish hurler who currently played as a right wing-back
- Paudie O'Mahony (born 1952), Irish retired Gaelic footballer
- Paudie O'Neill (born 1957), Irish retired hurler and Gaelic footballer
- Paudie O'Se or Páidí Ó Sé (1955–2012), Irish Gaelic football manager and player
- Paudie Ireland (born 1987), Irish Gaelic Football player
- Paudie O'Sullivan (born 1988), Irish hurler who plays as a Full Forward
- Paudie Prendergast (born 1960), retired Irish hurler
- Paudie Sheehy (1932–1967), Irish sportsperson

== See also ==
- Padi (disambiguation)
- Phaudidae
