= Railyard GAA =

Railyard
- Cumann Peile Railyard
- Founded: 1943
- County: Kilkenny
- Colours: Red and white
- Grounds: Chapel Lane

Playing kits
Standard colours

Senior Club Championships
	All Ireland	Leinster champions	Kilkenny champions
Football:	0	0	22

Railyard Gaelic Football Club is a Gaelic Athletic Association club located in Moneenroe, County Kilkenny, Ireland. The club is solely concerned with the game of Gaelic football.

== History ==
Located in the village of Moneenroe, on the Laois-Kilkenny border, Railyard Gaelic Football Club was founded by local FCA members at the height of the Emergency in April 1943. The club was just six years old when it achieved senior status by winning the Kilkenny JFC title. After that initial victory, Railyard went on to dominate the next three decades by winning 17 Kilkenny SFC titles between 1951 and 1978, including a record-setting five titles in-a-row on two occasions.

That 17th title put them equal with Glenmore at the top of the all-time roll of honour, however, the club went through a downturn that saw them lose seven finals before claiming their next title victory in 1992. Railyard entered its third century by claiming another title in 1999. Three successive final victories between 2014 and 2016 gave Railyard a record-setting 22 titles.

== Honours ==
- Kilkenny Senior Football Championship (22): 1951, 1952, 1953, 1957, 1958, 1959, 1960, 1961, 1965, 1966, 1967, 1969, 1970, 1971, 1972, 1973, 1978, 1992, 1999, 2014, 2015, 2016
- Moremiles Cup (2): 1985, 1986
- Kilkenny Junior Football Championship (1): 1949, 2018
- North Kilkenny Junior Football Championship (1): 1988, 1992, 1993
- Kilkenny Special Junior Football Championship (1): 1993
- Kilkenny Under-21 A Football Championship (1): 2005
- Kilkenny Under-21 B Football Championship (2): 1987, 1999
- Kilkenny Minor A Football Championship (10): 1950, 1954, 1956, 1959, 1962, 1963, 1966, 1967, 2000, 2001
- Kilkenny Minor B Football Championship (2): 1988, 2005
- Kilkenny Minor C Football Championship (1): 2011, 2022, 2024
