= 2023 Kilkenny Intermediate Hurling Championship =

- Dates: 16 September – 22 October 2023
- Teams: 12
- Sponsor: Michael Lyng Motors Hyundai
- Champions: Thomastown (2nd title); Stephen Donnelly (captain); Noel Doherty (manager)
- Runners-up: Mooncoin
- Relegated: O'Loughlin Gaels

Tournament statistics
- Matches played: 12
- Goals scored: 32 (2.67 per match)
- Points scored: 354 (29.5 per match)
- Top scorer(s): Robbie Donnelly (2-27)

The 2023 Kilkenny Intermediate Hurling Championship was the 59th staging of the Kilkenny Intermediate Hurling Championship since its establishment by the Kilkenny County Board in 1929. The championship ran from 16 September to 22 October 2023.

The final was played on 22 October 2023 at UPMC Nowlan Park in Kilkenny, between Thomastown and Mooncoin, in what was their second meeting in the final overall and a first meeting in 23 years. Thomastown won the match by 1-29 to 0-17 to claim their second championship title overall and a first title in 40 years.

Thomastown's Robbie Donnelly was the championship's top scorer with 2-27.

== Team changes ==
=== To Championship ===
Promoted from the Kilkenny Premier Junior Hurling Championship

- Blacks and Whites

Relegated from the Kilkenny Senior Hurling Championship

- Lisdowney

=== From Championship ===
Promoted to the Kilkenny Senior Hurling Championship

- Danesfort

Relegated to the Kilkenny Premier Junior Hurling Championship

- St Lachtain's

== Results ==
=== First round ===
| 16 September 2023 First round | Rower-Inistioge | 0-16 - 3-20 | Young Irelands | St John's Park |
| | M Galavan (0-7, 0-6 frees), J Ryan (0-3), R Galavan (0-2), C Joyce (0-1, 0-1 free), K Murphy, T Murphy, T Doyle (0-1 each) | Report | P Holden (1-4, 0-3 frees), T Drea (1-3), P Langton (0-6, 0-1 free), J Brennan (1-2), M Carey, P Naddy, S Carey, P Brennan, S Farrell (0-1 each) |

| 16 September 2023 First round | Mooncoin | 3-22 - 3-12 | Blacks and Whites | Thomastown Grounds |
| | K Crowley (1-4), A Croke (1-2), P Walsh (0-5, 0-2 frees), P Henebry (0-4, 0-2 frees), C Quilty (1-0), K Hogan, M Kearns, M O’Neill, S Gannon, C Daly and S Crowley (0-1 each) | Report | R Murphy (1-5,0-5 frees), S Byrne (1-2), S Doyle (1-0), N Kennedy (free), A O’Dowd (Sideline), M Kelly, J Byrne and J Byrne (0-1 each). |

| 16 September 2023 First round | Conahy Shamrocks | 1-17 - 0-16 | O'Loughlin Gaels | Muckalee Grounds |
| | J Bergin (1-8, 0-5 frees and 0-2‘65s); T Rice (0-3); K Mooney (0-2, 0-1 free); D Cuddihy, D Brennan, T Phelan, E Delaney (0-1 each). | Report | S Bolger (0-10, 0-9 frees, 0-1 65), R Poyntz (0-3), K Murphy (0-2), S Johnston (0-1) |

| 17 September 2023 First round | Carrickshock | 0-14 - 0-16 | Fenians | St John's Park |
| | J Power (0-4, 0-3 frees); E O’Neill (0-4, 0-2 frees); J O’Dwyer, E Crowley, K Farrell (0-2 each). | Report | M Webster (0-8, frees); C Tobin (0-4, 0-1 line ball); W Brennan, A Duggan, P O’Grady, C Phelan (0-1 each). |

=== Relegation playoff ===
| 1 October 2023 Playoff | O'Loughlin Gaels | 2-14 - 3-13 | Carrickshock | John Locke Park |
| | S Johnston (0-10, 0-6 frees), K Murphy (1-1), G Kelly (1-0), R Poyntz (0-2), A Sheridan (0-1) | Report | E O’Neill (0-6, 0-3 frees), K Farrell; E Crowley (1-1 each), B Lennon (1-0), J Power (0-2, 0-2 frees), D Walsh (0-2), S Moore (0-1) |

=== Quarter-finals ===
| 23 September 2023 Quarter-final | Thomastown | 4-22 - 2-10 | Fenians | Tom Ryall Park |
| | R Donnelly (1-15, 0-11 frees); J Holden (2-0); J Donnelly (1-1); L Connellan (0-2); B Staunton, S Donnelly, J Barron (0-1 each). | Report | M Webster (0-5, frees); P O'Grady, P Duggan (1-0 each); C Tobin (0-2 frees); J Henderson (0-1 free); W Brennan, K Grehan (0-1 each). |

| 23 September 2023 Quarter-final | Lisdowney | 1-18 - 0-11 | Conahy Shamrocks | St Patrick's Park |
| | A McEvoy (0-11, frees); N Brennan (0-4); L Dunphy (1-1); D O’Carroll and C Brennan (0-1, each). | Report | J Bergin (0-3, 0-2 frees); D Dooley (0-3, 0-2 frees); T Phelan (0-2); E Delaney (0-2, 0-1 line-ball); M Gunner (0-1). |

| 24 September 2023 Quarter-final | Dunnamaggin | 1-04 - 0-06 | Young Irelands | Thomastown Grounds |
| | John Fitzpatrick (1-1, 0-1 free), D Walsh (0-2), D Fitzpatrick (0-1). | Report | P Holden (0-5, 0-2 frees), M Walsh (0-1). |

| 24 September 2023 Quarter-final | St Martin's | 0-11 - 1-10 | Mooncoin | Páirc Shéamuis Stíophán |
| | S Hunt (0-3), S Kinsella (0-2), B Coady, J Morrissey, T Gill, R Kealy, J Mulhall (0-1 each), O Kelly (0-1 free) | Report | P Walsh (0-6, 0-3 frees), K Hogan (1-0), C Quilty (0-2), P Henebry (0-2 frees) |

=== Semi-finals ===
| 8 October 2023 Semi-final | Thomastown | 4-24 - 0-16 | Dunnamaggin | UPMC Nowlan Park |
| | J Holden (2-2); R Donnelly (1-7, 0-7 frees); S Donnelly (1-4, 0-1 free); L Connellan (0-3); T O’Hanrahan, J Donnelly (0-2 each); Z Bay Hammond, P Connellan, D Waugh, J Farrell (0-1 each). | Report | John Fitzpatrick (0-4, 0-3 frees, 0-1 65); Joe Fitzpatrick (0-3, 0-1 free); M Cody (0-3); A Hickey (0-2); R Cody, P Kenneally, E Kearney, L Fitzpatrick (0-1 each). |

| 8 October 2023 Semi-final | Lisdowney | 1-10 - 2-16 | Mooncoin | UPMC Nowlan Park |
| | E Kenny (1-0); E McEvoy (0-4, 0-1 free); L Dunphy (0-2); N Brennan (0-2 frees); K Sweeney, A Tallis (0-1 each). | Report | P Walsh (2-3); M Kearns (1-0); C Quilty (0-3); K Hogan, A Croke, S O’Dwyer (0-2 each); P Henebry (0-2, 0-1 free); S Crowley, S Gannon (0-1 each). |

=== Final ===
| 22 October 2023 Final | Thomastown | 1-29 - 0-17 | Mooncoin | UPMC Nowlan Park |
| | S Donnelly (1-8), J Donnelly (0-6), R Donnelly (0-5, 0-5f), L Connellan (0-4), T O'Hanrahan, J Holden (0-2 each), J Barron (0-1) | Report | P Walsh (0-4, 0-4f), A Croke (0-4), P Henebery (0-3, 0-3f), M O'Neill, J Delahunty (0-2 each), S Gannon, C Quilty (0-1 each) |

== Championship statistics ==
=== Top scorers ===
Overall

| Rank | Player | County | Tally | Total | Matches | Average |
|---|---|---|---|---|---|---|
| 1 | Robbie Donnelly | Thomastown | 2-27 | 33 | 3 | 11.00 |
| 2 | Pa Walsh | Mooncoin | 2-18 | 24 | 4 | 6.00 |
| 3 | Stephen Donnelly | Thomastown | 2-13 | 19 | 3 | 6.66 |
| 4 | Jack Holden | Thomastown | 4-04 | 16 | 3 | 5.33 |
| 5 | James Bergin | Conahy Shamrocks | 1-11 | 14 | 2 | 7.00 |
| 6 | Mark Webster | Fenians | 0-13 | 13 | 2 | 6.50 |
| 7 | Paul Holden | Young Irelands | 1-09 | 12 | 2 | 6.00 |
| 7 | John Donnelly | Thomastown | 1-09 | 12 | 3 | 4.00 |
| 9 | Adam Croke | Mooncoin | 1-08 | 11 | 4 | 2.75 |
| 9 | Paul Henebery | Mooncoin | 0-11 | 11 | 4 | 2.75 |
| 9 | Andrew McEvoy | Lisdowney | 0-11 | 11 | 2 | 5.50 |
| 9 | Sammy Johnston | O'Loughlin Gaels | 0-11 | 11 | 2 | 5.50 |

In a single game

| Rank | Player | Club | Tally | Total | Opposition |
|---|---|---|---|---|---|
| 1 | Robbie Donnelly | Thomastown | 1-15 | 18 | Fenians |
| 2 | Stephen Donnelly | Thomastown | 1-08 | 11 | Mooncoin |
| 2 | James Bergin | Conahy Shamrocks | 1-08 | 11 | O'Loughlin Gaels |
| 2 | Andrew McEvoy | Lisdowney | 0-11 | 11 | Conahy Shamrocks |
| 5 | Jack Holden | Thomastown | 2-02 | 10 | Dunnamaggin |
| 5 | Robbie Donnelly | Thomastown | 1-07 | 10 | Dunnamaggin |
| 5 | Seán Bolger | O'Loughlin Gaels | 0-10 | 10 | Conahy Shamrocks |
| 5 | Sammy Johnston | O'Loughlin Gaels | 0-10 | 10 | Carrickshock |
| 9 | Pa Walsh | Mooncoin | 2-03 | 9 | Lisdowney |
| 10 | Ryan Murphy | Blacks and Whites | 1-05 | 8 | Mooncoin |
| 10 | Mark Webster | Fenians | 0-08 | 8 | Carrickshock |
