= 1993 Kilkenny Intermediate Hurling Championship =

- Teams: 12
- Sponsor: Vale Oil
- Champions: John Locke's (2nd title); Seán Hogan (captain)
- Runners-up: Thomastown

The 1993 Kilkenny Intermediate Hurling Championship was the 29th staging of the Kilkenny Intermediate Hurling Championship since its establishment by the Kilkenny County Board in 1929.

The final was played on 31 October 1993 at Nowlan Park in Kilkenny, between John Locke's and Thomastown, in what was their first ever meeting in the final. John Locke's won the match by 3–11 to 2–12 to claim their second championship title overall and a first championship title in 57 years.

== Results ==
=== Final ===
31 October 1993 Final	John Locke's	3-11 - 2-12	Thomastown	Nowlan Park
	D Roche 2-4, D Maher 1-1, Philip Comerford 0-2, Paddy Comerford 0-1, J Power 0-1, K Coffey 0-1, D Lynch 0-1.		P Treacy 0-7, C Fitzgerald 1-2, B Doyle 1-0, B O'Keeffe 0-1, T O'Keeffe 0-1, J Donnelly 0-1.
