= Paudie Lannon =

Irish hurler

Personal information
- Native name: Páidí Ó Leannáin (Irish)
- Born: 1956 (age 69–70) Thomastown, County Kilkenny, Ireland

Sport
- Sport: Hurling
- Position: Midfielder
Club
- Years: Club
- Thomastown
Inter-county*
Years	County	Apps (scores)
1981-1983	Kilkenny	3 (0-00)
Inter-county titles
- Leinster titles: 0
- All-Irelands: 1
- NHL: 1
- *Inter County team apps and scores correct as of 19:48, 27 June 2014.

Paudie Lannon (born 1956) is an Irish retired hurler who played as a midfielder for the Kilkenny senior team.

Born in Thomastown, County Kilkenny, Lannon first arrived on the inter-county scene at the age of sixteen when he first linked up with the Kilkenny minor team, before later joining the under-21 side. He made his senior debut during the 1981 championship. Lannon enjoyed a brief inter-county career, during which time he won one All-Ireland medal and one National Hurling League medal.

At club level Lannon played with Thomastown.

Lannon retired from inter-county hurling following Kilkenny's defeat of Cork in the 1983 All-Ireland final.

== Honours ==
=== Team ===
Kilkenny

- All-Ireland Senior Hurling Championship (2): 1982 (sub), 1983
- Leinster Senior Hurling Championship (2): 1982 (sub), 1983 (sub)
- National Hurling League (2): 1981-82 (sub), 1982-83
