= 2019 Kilkenny Senior Football Championship =

Kilkenny S.F.C.
- Season: 2019
- Champions: Mullinavat (4th S.F.C. Title)
- Relegated: James Stephens
- All Ireland ICFC: n/a
- Leinster ICFC: Mullinavat

The 2019 Kilkenny Senior Football Championship was the 126th edition of the Kilkenny GAA's premier club Gaelic football tournament for senior graded teams in County Kilkenny, Ireland. The tournament consisted of 12 clubs with the winner going on to represent Kilkenny in the Leinster Intermediate Club Football Championship. The championship is conducted in a straight knock-out format.

Mullinavat were the defending champions for the second year running after defeating Muckalee in the previous year's final.

This was Tullogher-Rosbercon's return to the senior grade after claiming the 2018 Kilkenny I.F.C. title.

On 11 August 2019, Mullinavat claimed their 4th Kilkenny S.F.C. crown when defeating Railyard by 1-13 to 0-10 after a replay in the final at Nolan Park.

James Stephens were relegated to the 2020 I.F.C. after conceding a walkover to Glenmore in the Relegation Final. This ended their 12 year consecutive streak in the senior ranks since their promotion in 2007.

This tournament was sponsored by JJ Kavanagh and Sons.

== Team changes ==
The following teams have changed division since the 2018 championship season.

=== To S.F.C. ===
Promoted from 2018 Kilkenny I.F.C.

- Tullogher-Rosbercon - (Intermediate Champions)

=== From S.F.C. ===
Relegated to 2019 Kilkenny I.F.C.

- St Patrick's Ballyragget

== Round 1 ==
| 23 February 2019; 14:30; Round 1 | Clara | 3-6 - 1-7 | James Stephens | Larchfield; Referee: John Bennett |

| 23 February 2019; 14:30; Round 1 | Kilmoganny | 0-8 - 0-7 | Glenmore | Glenmore; Referee: Gavin Quilty |

| 23 February 2019; 14:30; Round 1 | Muckalee | 1-13 - 2-6 | Tullogher-Rosbercon | Tullogher; Referee: John McCormack |

| 26 February 2019; 20:00; Round 1 | O'Loughlin Gaels | 4-13 - 1-7 | Danesfort | Danesfort; Referee: Gay Rafter |

== Quarter-finals ==
| 2 March 2019; 13:00; Quarter-Final | Muckalee | 2-7 - 2-7 | Dicksboro | Larchfield; Referee: Gay Rafter |

| 2 March 2019; 15:00; Quarter-Final | Mullinavat | 2-6 - 1-9 | O'Loughlin Gaels | Mullinavat; Referee: Willie Kearney |

| 8 March 2019; 20:00; Quarter-Final Replay | Muckalee | 2-12 - 0-10 | Dicksboro | Muckalee; Referee: Peter Burke |

| 13 March 2019; 20:00; Quarter-Final Replay | Mullinavat | 1-10 - 0-7 | O'Loughlin Gaels | ??? Referee: ??? |

| 27 April 2019; 14:30; Quarter-Final | Railyard | 1-7 - 0-4 | Clara | Moneenroe; Referee: Eamon Larkin |

| 5 May 2019; 11:30; Quarter-Final | Conahy Shamrocks | 3-11 - 1-10 | Kilmoganny | Jenkinstown; Referee: Seán Cleere |

== Semi-finals ==
| 6 July 2019; 19:00; Semi-Final | Mullinavat | 2-16 - 1-11 | Muckalee | Danesfort; Referee: Paul Cahill |

| 10 July 2019; 19:30; Semi-Final | Railyard | 0-9 - 0-7 | Conahy Shamrocks | Muckalee; Referee: Peter Burke |
| 10 July 2019; 19:30; Semi-Final | | Report | | Muckalee; Referee: Peter Burke |

== Final ==
| 21 July 2019; 16:00; Final | Mullinavat | 1-7 - 1-7 | Railyard | Callan; Referee: Gavin Quilty |
| 21 July 2019; 16:00; Final | | Report | | Callan; Referee: Gavin Quilty |

| 11 August 2019; 13:30; Final replay | Mullinavat | 1-13 - 0-10 | Railyard | Nolan Park, Kilkenny; Referee: Sean Cleere |
| 11 August 2019; 13:30; Final replay | | Report | | Nolan Park, Kilkenny; Referee: Sean Cleere |

== Relegation final ==
| 2019; Relegation Final | Glenmore | w/o - scr | James Stephens | ??? Referee: ??? |
