= 1983 Kilkenny Intermediate Hurling Championship =

- Champions: Thomastown (1st title); Dick O'Hara (captain)
- Runners-up: O'Loughlin Gaels

The 1983 Kilkenny Intermediate Hurling Championship was the 19th staging of the Kilkenny Intermediate Hurling Championship since its establishment by the Kilkenny County Board.

The final was played on 2 October 1983 at Nowlan Park in Kilkenny, between Thomastown and O'Loughlin Gaels, in what was their first ever meeting in the final. Thomastown won the match by 2–08 to 1–03 to claim their first ever championship title.

== Results ==
=== Semi-finals ===
14 August 1983 Semi-final	O'Loughlin Gaels	3-09 - 1-14	Piltown	Nowlan Park
	A Bergin 2-1, R Delaney 1-0, M Cleere 0-3, B Cleere 0-1, G Fitzpatrick 0-1, B Ryan 0-1, O Bergin 0-1, K Robinson 0-1.		D McCarthy 1-2, L McCarthy 0-5, JJ Long 0-2, G Culleton 0-2, J Norris 0-2, J O'Sullivan 0-1.

14 August 1983 Semi-final	Thomastown	3-08 - 3-06	Graignamanagh	Nowlan Park
	P Lannon 1-5, J Donnelly 1-3, J O'Hara 1-0.		P Nolan 2-3, P Prendergast 1-2, M Morrissey 0-1.

=== Final ===
2 October 1983 Final	Thomastown	2-08 - 1-03	O'Loughlin Gaels	Nowlan Park
	R Murphy 1-2, G Walsh 1-1, J Donnelly 0-3, P Lannon 0-1, M Farrell 0-1.		M Lanigan 1-0, J Mulcahy 0-2, A Bergin 0-1.	Referee: E Holland (Tullaroan)
