= Glenmore =

Glenmore may refer to:

== Australia ==
- Glenmore, Queensland, a suburban district of Rockhampton, Queensland
  - Glenmore Homestead, Rockhampton, an historic property near Rockhampton, Queensland
- Glenmore, Victoria
- Glenmore Park, New South Wales
  - Glenmore, Mulgoa, an historic property in the suburb of Mulgoa, New South Wales

== Canada ==
- Glenmore, British Columbia, a suburban district of the city of Kelowna, British Columbia
- Glenmore Reservoir of the city of Calgary, Alberta

== Indonesia ==
- Glenmore, Indonesia, a district in Banyuwangi Regency, East Java Province

== Ireland ==
- Glenmore, a small council estate in South Dublin adjacent to Whitechurch, County Dublin
- Glenmore, a rural valley in County Louth
- Glenmore, County Kilkenny, a village in County Kilkenny

== Scotland ==
- Glenmore Forest Park, Scotland
- Glenmore, Skye, a small settlement near Mugeary

== South Africa ==
- Glenmore, a neighbourhood of the greater Berea area of Durban
- Glenmore Beach, a seaside village in KwaZulu-Natal

== United States ==
- Glenmore, New Jersey, unincorporated community
- Glenmore, Ohio, unincorporated community
- Glenmore, Wisconsin, a town
- Glenmore, Albemarle County, Virginia, a village in Virginia
- Glenmore, Buckingham County, Virginia, a village in Virginia
- Glenmore (community), Wisconsin, an unincorporated community
- Glenmore Township LaMoure County, North Dakota
- Glenmore (Jefferson City, Tennessee), a house listed on the National Register of Historic Places
- Glenmore (Arlington, Virginia), a house recognized as a historic district
- Glenmore Distillery Company, Owensboro, Kentucky

== People ==
- Glenmore Webley (1952-1987), Jamaican politician

== See also ==
- Glenmoor
