= 1946 Kilkenny Senior Hurling Championship =

Annual hurling competition season

- Dates: 12 May – 10 November 1946
- Teams: 11
- Champions: Thomastown (1st title); Dan Kennedy (captain)
- Runners-up: Carrickshock

Tournament statistics
- Matches played: 10
- Goals scored: 66 (6.6 per match)
- Points scored: 115 (11.5 per match)

The 1946 Kilkenny Senior Hurling Championship was the 52nd staging of the Kilkenny Senior Hurling Championship since its establishment by the Kilkenny County Board in 1887. The championship ran from 12 May to 10 November 1946.

Éire Óg were the defending champions, however, they were beaten by Dicksboro in the first round.

The final was played on 10 November 1946 at Nowlan Park in Kilkenny, between first-time finalists Thomastown and Carrickshock. Thomastown won the match by 5–04 to 4–05 to claim their first ever championship title.

== Team changes ==
=== To Championship ===
Promoted from the Kilkenny Junior Hurling Championship

- Thomastown

== Results ==
=== First round ===
| 12 May 1946 First round | Éire Óg | 3-07 - 3-12 | Dicksboro | Nowlan Park |

| 26 May 1946 First round | James Stephens | 5-05 - 5-04 | Northern Junior Selection | Nowlan Park |

| 26 May 1946 First round | Carrickshock | 5-06 - 3-03 | Southern Junior Selection | Grennan Sportsfield |

| 23 June 1946 First round | Mullinavat | 2-03 - 3-16 | Tullaroan | Grennan Sportsfield |

| 14 July 1946 First round | Thomastown | 3-05 - 2-02 | Mooncoin | Grennan Sportsfield |

- St Brendan's received a bye in this round.

=== Second round ===
| 21 July 1946 Second round | St Brendan's | 1-04 - 2-03 | Dicksboro | John Locke's Park |

| 11 August 1946 Second round | Carrickshock | 3-10 - 3-05 | Tullaroan | Grennan Sportsfield |

| 8 September 1946 Second round | James Stephens | 4-04 - 4-08 | Thomastown | John Locke's Park |

=== Semi-final ===
| 13 October 1946 Semi-final | Thomastown | 3-06 - 3-03 | Dicksboro | Nowlan Park |

- Carrickshock received a bye in this round.

=== Final ===
| 10 November 1946 Final | Thomastown | 5-04 - 4-05 | Carrickshock | Nowlan Park |
