= 2023–24 All-Ireland Intermediate Club Hurling Championship =

All-Ireland inter-county competition for intermediate clubs

Championship Details
- Dates: 28 October 2023 - 13 January 2024
- Teams: 26

All Ireland Champions
- Winners: Thomastown (1st win)
- Captain: Stephen Donnelly
- Manager: Noel Doherty

All Ireland Runners-up
- Runners-up: Castlelyons
- Captain: Colm Spillane
- Manager: Noel Furlong

Provincial Champions
- Munster: Castlelyons
- Leinster: Thomastown
- Ulster: Setanta
- Connacht: Tooreen

Championship Statistics
- Matches Played: 24
- Total Goals: 72 (3.00 per game)
- Total Points: 801 (33.37 per game)
- Top Scorer: Robbie Donnelly (1-43)

The 2023–24 All-Ireland Intermediate Club Hurling Championship was the 19th staging of the All-Ireland Intermediate Club Hurling Championship, the Gaelic Athletic Association's intermediate inter-county club hurling tournament. The draws for the respective provincial championships took place at various stages. The championship ran from 28 October 2023 to 13 January 2024.

The All-Ireland final was played on 13 January 2024 at Croke Park in Dublin, between Thomastown from Kilkenny and Castlelyons from Cork, in what was their first ever meeting in the final. Thomastown won the match by 2-23 to 0-13 to claim their first ever All-Ireland title.

Thomastown's Robbie Donnelly was the championship's top scorer with 1-43.

== Team summaries ==
Team	County	Most recent success		
Team	County	All-Ireland	Provincial	County
Ballinascreen	Derry			
Ballinderreen	Galway			2017
Bray Emmets	Wicklow		2022	2022
Bredagh	Down			2019
Castlelyons	Cork			
Clodiagh Gaels	Offaly			2021
Cloughbawn	Wexford			1973
Corofin	Clare			2002
Crotta O'Neill's	Kerry			1968
Dromin/Athlacca	Limerick			2013
Éire Óg Carrickmore	Tyrone			2022
Ferrybank	Waterford			1968
Four Roads	Roscommon			2022
Inniskeen Grattans	Monaghan			2016
Kickhams Creggan	Antrim		2015	2015
Kildalkey	Meath			2021
Lisbellaw St. Patrick's	Fermanagh		2012	2013
Lorrha-Dorrha	Tipperary			2007
Middletown Na Fianna	Armagh		2017	2022
Naomh Mearnóg	Dublin			
Portlaoise	Laois			
Setanta	Donegal			2022
St Oliver Plunkett's	Westmeath			
Thomastown	Kilkenny			1983
Tooreen	Mayo		2022	2022

== Connacht Intermediate Club Hurling Championship ==
=== Connacht quarter-final ===
30 October 2023 Quarter-final	Four Roads (Roscommon)	2-14 - 2-23	Tooreen (Mayo)	Athleague Sportsfield
	C Dolan (0-9, 7 frees), M Kelly (2-1, 1-0 free, 1-0 pen), C Mulry (0-3), B Mulry (0-1).	Report	S Boland (0-10, 8 frees), E Delaney (1-3), K Feeney (1-2), B Morley (0-2), S Kenny (0-2, 1 ’65), D Huane (0-1); L Lavin (0-1), S Coyne (0-1), D Harrison (0-1).	Referee: S Hynes (Galway)

=== Connacht semi-final ===
Semi-final	Tooreen (Mayo)	w/o - scr.	London champions (London)
		Report

=== Connacht final ===
26 November 2023 Final	Ballinderreen (Galway)	0-19 - 0-21	Tooreen (Mayo)	Athleague Sportsfield
	R Lane 0-6 (5f), N Coen 0-5, K Lane 0-3, R Meehan, E Morgan, S Larkin, K Ryan and K Gill 0-1 each.	Report	S Kenny (3f, 1 ’65), S Boland (4f) and E Delaney 0-5 each, L Lavin 0-2, O Greally, K Feeney, F Boland and B Morley 0-1 each.

== Leinster Intermediate Club Hurling Championship ==
=== Leinster quarter-finals ===
11 November 2023 Quarter-final	St Oliver Plunkett's (Westmeath)	0-07 - 2-20	Naomh Mearnóg (Dublin)	TEG Cusack Park
	P Lynam 0-3 (2 frees), C Craig, D Gavin, R Corroon, N Cornally 0-1 each.	Report	L Mullin 0-10 (7 frees), J Philips 1-3, B Deay 1-2, S Hawkshaw 0-2, S Kavanagh, C Farrelly, C Madden 0-1 each.

11 November 2023 Quarter-final	Kildalkey (Meath)	2-20 - 2-08	Clodiagh Gaels (Offaly)	St Loman's Park
	P Conneely 0-9; N Potterton 1-4 (1-0 penalty, three frees); P Potterton 0-3; B Conneely 1-0; D Harmon 0-1; P Barnwell 0-1; B O'Halloran 0-1; M Healy 0-1;	Report	D Dunne 2-2 (1-1 frees); C Langton 0-3; R Dunne 0-1; L Langton 0-1; C Curran 0-1.

11 November 2023 Quarter-final	Cloughbawn (Wexford)	1-12 - 3-21	Thomastown (Kilkenny)	McCauley Park
	É Doyle (1-1), H Kehoe (0-4 frees), C Flood (0-3, 1 free), B Carton (0-2, 1 line ball), P Whitty (0-1); S Keating (0-1 free).	Report	R Donnelly (1-7, 0-5 frees), S Donnelly (1-3, 0-2 frees), L Connellan (0-5), J Donnelly (0-4); T O’Hanrahan (1-0), P McDonald (0-2).

11 November 2023 Quarter-final	Bray Emmets (Wicklow)	0-18 - 0-16	Portlaoise (Laois)	Echelon Park
	C Moorehouse (0-13, 11f), A Murphy (0-1), P Doyle (0-1), B McCormack (0-1), M Lennon (0-1), B Nesbitt (0-1).	Report	A Bergin (0-12, 12f), D Sheehan (0-3, 1f), C Rigney (0-1).

=== Leinster semi-finals ===
25 November 2023 Semi-final	Kildalkey (Meath)	0-12 - 4-19	Thomastown (Kilkenny)	Páirc Tailteann
	N Potterton 0-6, P Conneely 0-4, P Potterton and E Fitzgerald 0-1 each	Report	R Donnelly 0-11, J Holden 2-2, T O’Hanrahan 1-1, L Connellan 1-0, JJ Farrell and J Donnelly 0-2 each, P McDonald 0-1.

25 November 2023 Semi-final	Bray Emmets (Wicklow)	1-16 - 0-15	Naomh Mearnóg (Dublin)	Echelon Park
	C Moorehouse (0-10, 6f, 1 65), E McCormack (1-1); D Masterson (0-2), M Lennon (0-1), B Nesbitt (0-1), S Lohan (0-1).	Report	L Mullin (0-10, 6f, 2 65), S Hawkshaw (0-2); S Nangle (0-1), C Farrelly (0-1).

=== Leinster final ===
9 December 2023 Final	Bray Emmets (Wicklow)	1-09 - 2-22	Thomastown (Kilkenny)	Echelon Park
	C Moorehouse (0-9, 5f, 1 65), B Nesbitt (1-0).	Report	R Donnelly (0-13, 7f), T O’Hanrahan (1-1), L Connellan (1-0), J Donnelly (0-2); D Waugh (0-2), JJ Farrell (0-1); J Holden (0-1), B O’Hanrahan (0-1); J Cullen (0-1).	Referee: A Kinahan (Offaly)

== Munster Intermediate Club Hurling Championship ==
=== Munster quarter-finals ===
5 November 2023 Quarter-final	Lorrha-Dorrha (Tipperary)	1-14 - 3-18	Corofin (Clare)	MacDonagh Park
	Colm Fogarty 0-10 (0-9f); E McIntyre 1-1; N McIntyre, C Hogan and Christopher Fogarty 0-1 each.	Report	D Cahill 3-2; J Organ 0-4; G Kelly 0-4f; G Cahill, 0-3; C Leen 0-2; K O’Connor, D Ryan and J Malone 0-1 each.	Referee: N Barry (Waterford)

12 November 2023 Quarter-final	Ferrybank (Waterford)	2-13 - 1-22	Crotta O'Neill's (Kerry)	FitzGerald Park
	M O’Brien (0-11, 10fs), D Griffin (1-1, 1f), L Flynn (1-0), R McGarrity (0-1).	Report	S Nolan (0-11, 8fs, 1 65), J Conway (0-6), J McKenna (1-0), D O’Donoghue (0-3), S Weir, R Mahony (0-1 each).

=== Munster semi-finals ===
19 November 2023 Semi-final	Corofin (Clare)	1-19 - 1-15	Dromin/Athlacca (Limerick)	Páirc Finne
	G Kelly 0-8 (5 frees), M Kelly 1-1, J Organ 0-4, G Cahill, D Cahill 0-2 each, S O'Brien 0-1.	Report	D Reidy 0-10 (9 frees), D Breen 1-0, D Scully 0-3, J Fitzgibbon 0-2.

19 November 2023 Semi-final	Crotta O'Neill's (Kerry)	2-18 - 2-22 (aet)	Castlelyons (Cork)	Jackie Finnerty Park
	J Conway 1-4 (0-1 sideline), S Nolan 0-6 (0-3f), S McElligott 1-2, B Mahony 0-2, S McGrath, C Trant, D O’Donoghue, S Weir 0-1 each.	Report	A Fenton 1-11 (0-10f, 1 65), L Doocey 1-2, J Barry 0-3 (0-1 puckout, 0-1f), D Morrison 0-2, N O’Leary, C Spillane, J Kearney, O Hallihan 0-1 each.

=== Munster final ===
2 December 2023 Final	Castlelyons (Cork)	3-16 - 0-19	Corofin (Clare)	TUS Gaelic Grounds
	A Spillane (3-2); A Fenton (0-8, 0-5 frees); K O’Leary (0-4); J Kearney, B Murphy (0-1 each).	Report	G Kelly (0-12, 0-9 frees); M Kelly, S O’Brien (0-2 each); J Organ, D Cahill, K O'Connor (0-1 each).	Referee: C Doyle (Tipperary)

== Ulster Intermediate Club Hurling Championship ==
=== Ulster quarter-finals ===
5 November 2023 Quarter-final	Bredagh (Down)	3-17 - 2-21	Kickhams Creggan (Antrim)	Páirc Esler
	M Patterson (1-3), T Sheehan (1-2f), S Hughes (0-5, 0-2f), C McMullan (1-1), S McGourty (0-2), N McFarland (0-1), N Smyth (0-1), C Costello (0-1), L Hogan (0-1).	Report	C McCann (1-6, 0-4f, 0-2 65’), K Rice (1-1), R McCann (0-3), S Duffin (0-3), M Nelson (0-2), L McCann (0-2), O McCann (0-2), T McCann (0-1).

5 November 2023 Quarter-final	Éire Óg Carrickmore (Tyrone)	2-17 - 2-13 (aet)	Lisbellaw St Patrick's (Fermanagh)	Páirc Colmcille
	S Og Grogan (1-3, 0-1 ’65), A Kelly (1-1), J Kelly (0-4), C Grogan (0-3), D Begley (0-2, 1 f, 1 ’65), R Slane (0-2); B McGurk (0-1), J Munroe (0-1).	Report	L McCusker (0-7, 2f, 3 ’65), C Duffy (1-1); Mark Slevin (1-0), F McBrien (0-3); S Corrigan (0-1), J Duffy (0-1).

5 November 2023 Quarter-final	Inniskeen Grattans (Monaghan)	0-09 - 0-26	Middletown Na Fianna (Armagh)	Grattan Park
		Report

5 November 2023 Quarter-final	Ballinascreen (Derry)	1-10 - 3-13	Setanta (Donegal)	Owenbeg COE
	C Gough 1-4,4f; A O’Hagan 0-1; R O’Kane 0-1; M Bradley 0-1; E Conway 0-3,3f.	Report	G Gilmore 1-9,6f; J Cronolly-McGee 1-1; O Marley 1-1; D Coulter 0-2.

=== Ulster semi-finals ===
18 November 2023 Semi-final	Kickhams Creggan (Antrim)	1-15 - 4-11	Éire Óg Carrickmore (Tyrone)	Owenbeg COE
	C McCann (0-9, 0-5 frees, 0-1 65), K Rice (1-2), L McCann (0-2); O McCann (0-1); T McLarnon (0-1).	Report	S Og Grogan (4-0), D Begley (0-6 frees), C Sweeney (0-2); R Slane (0-1); O Daly (0-1), A Kelly (0-1).

18 November 2023 Semi-final	Middletown Na Fianna (Armagh)	0-13 - 1-11	Setanta (Donegal)	Owenbeg COE
	R Gaffney (0-5 frees), B Toal (0-3), M Moan (0-2), N Curry (0-2), S Óg McGuinness (0-1).	Report	G Gilmore (0-6, 0-5 frees), J McGee-Cronolly (1-0), O Marley (0-1); D Coulter (0-1), B Lafferty (0-1), S Ward (0-1), R Campbell (0-1).

=== Ulster final ===
2 December 2023 Final	Setanta (Donegal)	1-16 - 2-11	Éire Óg Carrickmore (Tyrone)	Owenbeg COE
	G Gilmore (0-11, 8f, 1 ’65), S Ward (1-0), O Marley (0-2); J Connolly McGee (0-1), D Coulter (0-1), D Cullen (0-1).	Report	A Kelly (1-5, 3f, 1 ’65), D Rafferty (1-0, pen); D Begley (0-3, 3f), S Og Grogan (0-1), J Kelly (0-1), C Sweeney (0-1).	Referee: C McDonald (Antrim)

== All-Ireland Intermediate Club Hurling Championship ==
=== All-Ireland semi-finals ===
16 December 2023 Semi-final	Castlelyons	1-12 - 0-13	Tooreen	Glenisk O'Connor Park
	A Fenton (0-6, 0-5 frees, 0-1 ‘65); A Spillane (1-2); C Spillane (0-2); O Hallihan, J Kearney (0-1 each).	Report	S Boland (0-8, 0-7 frees); O Greally, E Delaney, F Boland, L Lavin, K Feeney (0-1 each).	Referee: C McDonald (Antrim)

17 December 2023 Semi-final	Thomastown	6-26 - 1-08	Setanta	Páirc Esler
	J Donnelly 3-2; S Donnelly 1-3; JJ Farrell 0-4; T O’Hanrahan 0-5; J Holden 1-2; L Connellan 0-3; A Cass 1-0; R Donnelly 0-3,1f; P McDonald 0-2; Z Bay-Hammond 0-1; N Dempsey 0-1.	Report	G Gilmore 1-3; R Campbell 0-2; D Coulter 0-1; D Cullen 0-1; J Cronnolly-McGee 0-1.

=== All-Ireland final ===
13 January 2024 Final	Thomastown	2-23 - 0-13	Castlelyons	Croke Park
	S Donnelly 2-3; Robbie Donnelly 0-9 (0-5f, 0-2 '65); J Donnelly 0-4; J Farrell 0-2; L Connellan 0-2; E Donnelly 0-1; P McDonald 0-1; J Holden 0-1	Report	A Fenton 0-7 (0-4f, 0-2 '65); N O’Leary 0-2; C Spillane 0-2; B Murphy 0-1; O Hallihan 0-1	Referee: Michael Kennedy (Tipperary)

== Championship statistics ==
=== Top scorers ===
Overall

Rank	Player	Club	Tally	Total	Matches	Average
1	Robbie Donnelly	Thomastown	1-43	46	5	9.20
2	Gerard Gilmore	Setanta	2-29	35	4	8.75
2	Alan Fenton	Castlelyons	1-32	35	4	8.75
4	Christy Moorehouse	Bray Emmets	0-32	32	3	10.66
5	Gearóid Kelly	Corofin	0-24	24	3	8.00
6	John Donnelly	Thomastown	3-14	23	5	4.60
6	Shane Boland	Tooreen	0-23	23	3	7.66
8	Stephen Donnelly	Thomastown	4-09	21	5	4.20
9	Liam Mullin	Naomh Mearnóg	0-20	20	2	10.00
10	Seán Óg Grogan	Éire Óg Carrickmore	5-04	19	3	6.33

In a single game

Rank	Player	Club	Tally	Total	Opposition
1	Alan Fenton	Castlelyons	1-11	14	Crotta O'Neill's
2	Christy Moorehouse	Bray Emmets	0-13	13	Portlaoise
2	Robbie Donnelly	Thomastown	0-13	13	Bray Emmets
4	Seán Óg Grogan	Éire Óg Carrickmore	4-00	12	Lisbellaw St Patrick's
4	Gerard Gilmore	Setanta	1-09	12	Ballinascreen
4	Aaron Bergin	Portlaoise	0-12	12	Bray Emmets
4	Gearóid Kelly	Corofin	0-12	12	Castlelyons
8	John Donnelly	Thomastown	3-02	11	Setanta
8	Anthony Spillane	Castlelyons	3-02	11	Corofin
8	Diarmuid Cahill	Corofin	3-02	11	Lorrha-Dorrha
8	Robbie Donnelly	Thomastown	0-11	11	Kildalkey
8	Gerard Gilmore	Setanta	0-11	11	Éire Óg Carrickmore
8	Mark O'Brien	Ferrybank	0-11	11	Crotta O'Neill's
8	Shane Nolan	Crotta O'Neill's	0-11	11	Ferrybank

=== Miscellaneous ===
- The delay in playing the London SHC final resulted in Tooreen receiving a bye into the Connacht Club IHC final.
