= Muckalee GAA =

Muckalee
- Maigh Coillí
- Founded: 1917
- County: Kilkenny
- Colours: Green and yellow
- Grounds: Muckalee
- Coordinates: 52°44′46″N 7°10′46″W

Playing kits
Standard colours

Senior Club Championships
	All Ireland	Leinster champions	Kilkenny champions
Football:	0	0	12

Muckalee / St Martin's clubhouse

Muckalee GAA is a Gaelic Athletic Association club located in Muckalee, County Kilkenny, Ireland. The club is solely concerned with the game of Gaelic football. It is a sister club of St. Martin's.

== History ==
Located in the townland of Muckalee, on the Carlow-Kilkenny border, Muckalee United, as the club was then known, was founded in 1917. The club was just five years old when it contested the JFC final, losing out to Barrow Rovers on that occasion. Muckalee made a breakthrough by winning the Northern JFC title in 1947, a win which was later converted into a Kilkenny JFC title. Further junior honours were claimed in 1953, 1966 and 1973.

After promotion to the senior ranks, Muckalee claimed their first Kilkenny SFC title in 1968. It was the first of five titles, the last of which was claimed in 1990. The new century saw Muckalee become a dominant force, winning seven more SFC titles between 2001 and 2013.

== Honours ==
- Kilkenny Senior Football Championship (12): 1968, 1975, 1977, 1987, 1990, 2001, 2004, 2005, 2010, 2011, 2012, 2013
- Kilkenny Intermediate Football Championship (1): 2026
- Kilkenny Junior Football Championship (4): 1947, 1953, 1966, 1973
- Kilkenny Under-21 A Football Championship (3): 2002, 2004, 2007
- Kilkenny Under-21 B Football Championship (3): 1990, 1996, 2001
- Kilkenny Minor A Football Championship (4): 2004, 2005, 2022, 2024
- Kilkenny Minor B Football Championship (2): 2001, 2002

== Notable players ==
- Canice Maher: All-Ireland MHC-winner (2008)
- John Maher: All-Ireland SHC-winner (2003)
- Eamon Morrissey: All-Ireland SHC-winner (1992, 1993)
- John Mulhall: All-Ireland SHC-winner (2011)
