= 2024 Kilkenny Senior Hurling Championship =

Annual hurling competition season

- Dates: 14 September - 27 October 2024
- Teams: 12
- Sponsor: St Canice's Credit Union
- Champions: Thomastown (2nd title); Jay Burke (captain); Noel Doherty (manager)
- Runners-up: O'Loughlin Gaels; Mark Bergin (captain); Brian Hogan (manager)
- Relegated: James Stephens

Tournament statistics
- Matches played: 12
- Goals scored: 32 (2.67 per match)
- Points scored: 415 (34.58 per match)
- Top scorer(s): Robbie Donnelly (0-29)

The 2024 Kilkenny Senior Hurling Championship was the 130th staging of the Kilkenny Senior Hurling Championship since its establishment by the Kilkenny County Board in 1887. The championship ran from 14 September to 27 October 2024.

O'Loughlin Gaels were the defending champions. Nine-time champions James Stephens's relegation brought an end to 59 years of top tier hurling for the club.

The final was played on 27 October 2024 at UPMC Nowlan Park in Kilkenny, between O'Loughlin Gaels and Thomastown, in what was their first ever meeting in the final. Thomastown won the match by 0-18 to 0-07 to claim their second championship title overall and a first title in 78 years.

Thomastown's Robbie Donnelly was the championship's top scorer with 0-29.

== Team changes ==
=== To Championship ===
Promoted from the Kilkenny Intermediate Hurling Championship

- Thomastown

=== From Championship ===
Relegated to the Kilkenny Intermediate Hurling Championship

- Danesfort

== Results ==
=== First round ===
14 September 2024 First round	Bennettsbridge	0-16 - 0-14	Clara	Thomastown Grounds
	D Blanchfield 0-5 (all frees), N Cleere (0-2 frees 0-1; 65), and H O’Neill 0-3 each, B Hughes, J Cleere, J Campion, S Byrne and S Morrissey 0-1 each	Report	C O’Shea 0-5 (0-4 frees, 0-1 65), L Ryan and P Cody 0-2 each, J Langton, M Kenny, C Hoyne, D Glynn and C Bolger 0-1 each

14 September 2024 First round	Erin's Own	5-14 - 1-21	Glenmore	Páirc Shéamuis Stíophán
	J Buggy (2-6, 4fs and 1 ‘65); M Brennan (2-1); C Korff (1-1); C McMahon (0-3); C Fogarty, D Buggy, S Coogan (0-1 each)	Report	A Murphy (0-9, 7fs and 1 ‘65); I Byrne (1-2); C Beirne (0-5); C Phelan (0-2); B Reid, G Aylward, S Murphy (0-1 each)

15 September 2024 First round	Dicksboro	1-24 - 1-11	Graigue-Ballycallan	Páirc Lachtain
	H Shine (0-7, 0-3 frees, 0-1 65); M Kelleher (1-2); C Hackett (0-4); L Moore (0-3); T Clifford, B Sheehan, K Moore (0-2 each); O Walsh, E Cody (0-1 each).	Report	A McEvoy (1-6, 0-4 frees, 0-1 65); S Ryan, T Ronan, T Dunphy, S Keoghan, J Roberts (0-1 each).

15 September 2024 First round	James Stephens	1-19 - 4-19	Ballyhale Shamrocks	John Locke Park
	C Kenny (0-13, 0-12 frees); E Guilfoyle (1-1); E McDermott, R Whelan (0-2 each); L Scanlon (0-1).	Report	TJ Reid (2-4, 0-2 frees); E Cody (1-4); A Mullen (1-3); P Mullen (0-3); N Shortall (0-2); J Fitzpatrick, K Corcoran, L Barron (0-1 each).

=== Relegation playoff ===
5 October 2024 Playoff	Glenmore	3-17 - 3-12	James Stephens	Thomastown Grounds
	A Murphy (0-7, 0-6 frees, 0-1 65); C Phelan (1-2); G Aylward (1-1); E Phelan (1-0); C Kirwan, C Beirne (0-2 each); M Harney, B Reid, I Byrne (0-1 each).	Report	C Kenny (0-6, frees); E Guilfoyle (1-1); L Scanlon, T O’Dwyer (1-0 each); E McDermott, E Lauhoff (0-2 each); R Whelan (0-1).

=== Quarter-finals ===
28 September 2024 Quarter-final	Thomastown	0-21 - 1-16	Ballyhale Shamrocks	John Locke Park
	R Donnelly (0-11, 0-9 frees); L Connellan, S Donnelly (0-3 each); C Treacy (0-2); Z Bay Hammond, J Farrell (0-1 each).	Report	TJ Reid (0-10, 0-8 frees and 0-2 65s); C Fennelly (1-0); E Cody (0-2); P Mullen, N Shortall, K Corcoran, A Mullen (0-1 each).

28 September 2024 Quarter-final	Tullaroan	1-23 - 2-26 (aet)	Bennettsbridge	Canon Kearns Park
	D Simpson (1-5, 0-2 frees); S Walsh (0-7, 0-3 frees, 0-2 65s); M Keoghan (0-6); B Gaffney (0-3); G Dunne, P Walsh (0-1 each).	Report	N Cleere (0-10, 0-9 frees and 0-1 65); S Morrissey (0-6); L Blanchfield (1-1); J Campion (1-0); C Brennan (0-3); J Hughes, S Byrne (0-2 each); D Blanchfield, J Cleere (0-1 each).

6 October 2024 Quarter-final	O'Loughlin Gaels	2-17 - 0-20	Dicksboro	UPMC Nowlan Park
	F Mackessy (1-4, 0-1 free); L Hogan (1-2); M Bergin (0-4, 0-4 frees); J Molloy (0-3); C Kelly (0-1, 0-1 free); S Bolger, P Deegan, D Fogarty (0-1 each)	Report	H Shine (0-10, 0-8 frees); T Clifford (0-3); C Hackett, J Sheehan (0-2 each); B Sheehan, C Buckley, S Stapleton (0-1 each)

6 October 2024 Quarter-final	Mullinavat	2-21 - 0-19	Erin's Own	UPMC Nowlan Park
	J Walsh 0-10, B Phelan 2-0, O Knox 0-3, M Malone 0-2, C Walsh 0-2, P Dempsey 0-1, J Gahan 0-1, O O'Dwyer 0-1, G Malone 0-1.	Report	J Buggy 0-10, C Fogarty 0-3, J Dowd 0-1, S Coogan 0-1, D Buggy 0-1, M Brennan 0-1, C McMahon 0-1, C Korff 0-1.

=== Semi-finals ===
13 October 2024 Semi-final	Bennettsbridge	1-14 - 2-17	O'Loughlin Gaels	UPMC Nowlan Park
	N Cleere (0-6, 0-3 frees and 0-1 ‘65); D Blanchfield (1-0); S Morrissey (0-3); T Kelly, H O’Neill, K Blanchfield, J Cleere, J Hughes (0-1 each)	Report	F Mackessy (1-7, 0-7 frees); J Ryan (0-4); S Johnston (1-0); D Fogarty, P Deegan, J Nolan, O Wall, C Heary, C Kelly (0-1 each)

13 October 2024 Semi-final	Thomastown	1-27 - 0-12	Mullinavat	UPMC Nowlan Park
	R Donnelly (0-10 / 0-9 frees / 0-1 65), T O’Hanrahan (1-2), S Donnelly (0-4), P McDonald, C Treacy, J Donnelly, B Staunton, L Connellan (0-2 each), R Connellan (0-1).	Report	John Walsh (0-7 / 0-5 frees), O Knox (0-3), M Malone, W O’Dwyer (0-1 each)

=== Final ===
27 October 2024 Final	O'Loughlin Gaels	0-07 – 0-18	Thomastown	UPMC Nowlan Park
	M Bergin 0-3 (1f); O Wall 0-2; C Heary, J Ryan 0-1 each	Report	R Donnelly 0-8 (6fs); J Donnelly 0-4; J Farrell, S Donnelly 0-2 each; R Connellan, P McDonald 0-1 each.	Referee: D Hughes (Barrow Rangers)

== Championship statistics ==
=== Top scorers ===
Overall

Rank	Player	Club	Tally	Total	Matches	Average
1	Robbie Donnelly	Thomastown	0-29	29	3	9.66
2	Jack Buggy	Erin's Own	2-16	22	2	11.00
3	T. J. Reid	Ballyhale Shamrocks	2-14	20	2	10.00
4	Cian Kenny	James Stephens	0-19	19	2	9.50
4	Nicky Cleere	Bennettsbridge	0-19	19	3	6.33
6	Fionán Mackessy	O'Loughlin Gaels	2-11	17	3	5.66
6	Harry Shine	Dicksboro	0-17	17	2	8.50
6	John Walsh	Mullinavat	0-17	17	2	8.50
9	Alan Murphy	Glenmore	0-16	16	2	8.00
10	Seán Morrissey	Bennettsbridge	0-10	10	3	3.33

Single game

Rank	Player	Club	Tally	Total	Opposition
1	Cian Kenny	James Stephens	0-13	13	Ballyhale Shamrocks
2	Jack Buggy	Erin's Own	2-06	12	Glenmore
3	Robbie Donnelly	Thomastown	0-11	11	Ballyhale Shamrocks
4	T. J. Reid	Ballyhale Shamrocks	2-04	10	James Stephens
4	Fionán Mackessy	O'Loughlin Gaels	1-07	10	Bennettsbridge
4	T. J. Reid	Ballyhale Shamrocks	0-10	10	Thomastown
4	Robbie Donnelly	Thomastown	0-10	10	Mullinavat
4	John Walsh	Mullinavat	0-10	10	Erin's Own
4	Jack Buggy	Erin's Own	0-10	10	Mullinavat
4	Nicky Cleere	Bennettsbridge	0-10	10	Tullaroan
4	Harry Shine	Dicksboro	0-10	10	O'Loughlin Gaels
