= Moneenroe =

Village in County Kilkenny, Ireland

Moneenroe An Móinín Rua (Irish)
- Village
- Location in Ireland
- Coordinates: 52°49′47″N 7°09′42″W
- Country: Ireland
- Province: Leinster
- County: County Kilkenny

Government
  - Dáil constituency: Carlow–Kilkenny
  - EU Parliament: South constituency

Population (2016)
  - Total: 722
- Time zone: UTC+0 (WET)
  - Summer (DST): UTC-1 (IST (WEST))
- Area code: +353

Moneenroe (from Irish An Móinín Rua, meaning 'the little red bog') is a townland, electoral division and village in north County Kilkenny, Ireland. It is located in the province of Leinster along the N78 road about 21 kilometres (13 mi) from Kilkenny city in the south-east of the island of Ireland. As of 2016, the population of Moneenroe was 722.

Moneenroe is approximately 5 kilometres (3.1 mi) from Castlecomer and 16 kilometres (9.9 mi) from Carlow town. Clogh village is 2 kilometres (1.2 mi) west.

== History ==
In the past, many from Moneenroe worked at the coal mines at Deerpark Mines, which closed in the 1960s.

== Geography ==
It is located on the N78 main road between Castlecomer and Carlow town, approximately 5 kilometres from Castlecomer and 16 kilometres from Carlow town. The village borders with County Laois at several points, with Crettyard being the closest townland in County Laois.

Townlands in the electoral division of Moneenroe include Coolbawn, Croghtenclogh, Gorteen, Moneenroe, Smithstown and Uskerty.

Móinín Rua means "The little red bog" due to the marshy land in some parts of the townland.

Moneenroe is the most densely populated rural area in the county.

=== Demographics ===
As of the 2006 census, by the Central Statistics Office, Moneenroe's population was 688. This was a 1.5% increase since 2002. As of the 2006 census, there was an exact 50%/50% split of males and females in the village. As of the 2016 census, the population had increased to 722.

== Landmarks ==
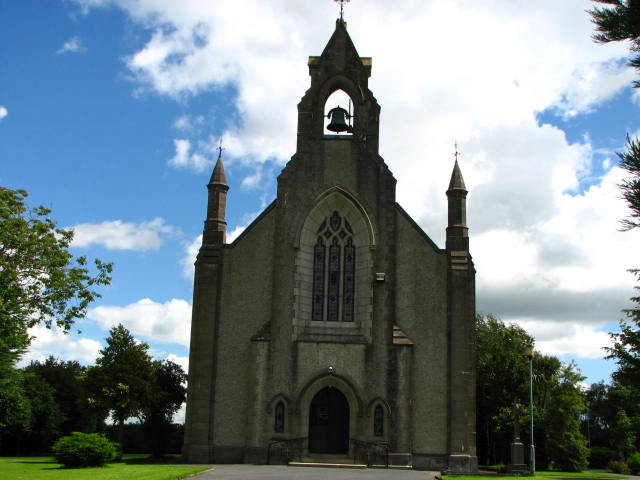
Church of the Sacred Heart

There are two local churches and a community hall. The Catholic Church is called Moneenroe Church of the Sacred Heart and the foundation stone was blessed in 1928 and was dedicated on 14 September 1930. The most striking feature inside this church is the windows. There is also a Church of Ireland church. The hall is called Moneenroe Parish Hall.

== Education ==
Moneenroe National School is a co-educational school with a catholic ethos.

== Governance ==
The local government is Kilkenny County Council. Ballyragget and its rural area forms an Electoral District which includes Attanagh, Ballyragget, Castlecomer, Clogh, Coon, Moneenroe, Ardra and Muckalee. The County Council representatives from the Ballyragget electoral district are Maurice Shortall, Mary Hilda Cavanagh, Pay Millea, Dan Brennan and Catherine Connery.

In European Parliament elections, Moneenroe is part of the South constituency for voting purposes. Moneenroe is part of the Carlow–Kilkenny constituency, which is a parliamentary constituency represented in Dáil Éireann.

== Industry ==
Agriculture employs about 100 people. The Castlecomer district has 60 farms. These range between 10 and 100 hectares, with a total of 2003 hectares being farmed. There are 4451 cattle and 768 sheep, and farming is done with grassland machines, tillage machines, tractors, winter feeding and milking equipment. Specialist farms include beef production, dairy and mixed grazing livestock.

After the closure of the coal mines in the 1960s, there was mass emigration to the US, Canada, the UK and Australia as people searched for work and a better life than that on the dole. Over the years, there have been many factories which have closed in the locality, leaving people to search for work in places such as Kilkenny, Carlow, Portlaoise and Dublin.

In the 1970s, the building of the Avonmore plant in Ballyragget helped keep local young people in the area gain local employment, and this continued with the jobs created when the plant was operational. The caravan manufacturing factory was briefly a large employer in the area before it closed down.

Castlecomer mills was also a major employer of clothing such as Lycra. However, this closed to a much cost-effective market in the Far East and has left a void for direct employment in the area since. However, further investment in the area came quickly when Roadstone (now called Ormonde brick) constructed a factory in Ardra for the manufacture of bricks for the building industry.

== Sport ==
Railyard Gaelic football team, or Railyard GFC, was founded mainly by members of Moneenroe FCA in 1943. The Railyard colours are red and white. The club were Senior football championship winners last in 2016, in which the club completed a hat-trick of titles. The club hold the most senior football titles with 22 and one more under the name of Moneenroe. The club also hold the distinction of being the last county champions to be crowned in Ireland in the old millennium when they won the senior title of 99 in December 1999, and were the first county championship in the country of the 2000s when winning the minor 1999 championship in January 2000

Also well established in Moneenroe is Railyard LGFC. The club is undergoing a resurgence of late as many ladies return to wear the famous white and red hoop jersey after winning many back to championship's in its early years

== Transport ==
Moneenroe is situated on the Dublin to Clonmel Bus Éireann bus route. Also, a private bus service, Buggy's of Castlecomer, has a daily bus service to and from Carlow town. Ring a Link is a community-based rural transport which operates a route in the Northeast of the county covering Castlecomer, Ballyraggett, Coan, Conahy, Muckalee, Ballyouskill, Clogh and Moneenroe.

== Culture ==
Moneenroe was home to Nicholas Boran, a professed communist and union organiser in the Castlecomer mines.

== See also ==
- List of towns and villages in Ireland
