= Thomastown GAA =

Gaelic games club in County Kilkenny, Ireland

Thomastown
- Baile Mhic Andáin
- Founded: 1905
- County: Kilkenny
- Nickname: The Town
- Colours: Blue and white
- Grounds: Grennan
- Coordinates: 52°31′23″N 7°07′44″W

Playing kits
Standard colours

Senior Club Championships
	All Ireland	Leinster champions	Kilkenny champions
Football:	0	0	5
Hurling:	0	0	2
Camogie:	0	2	7

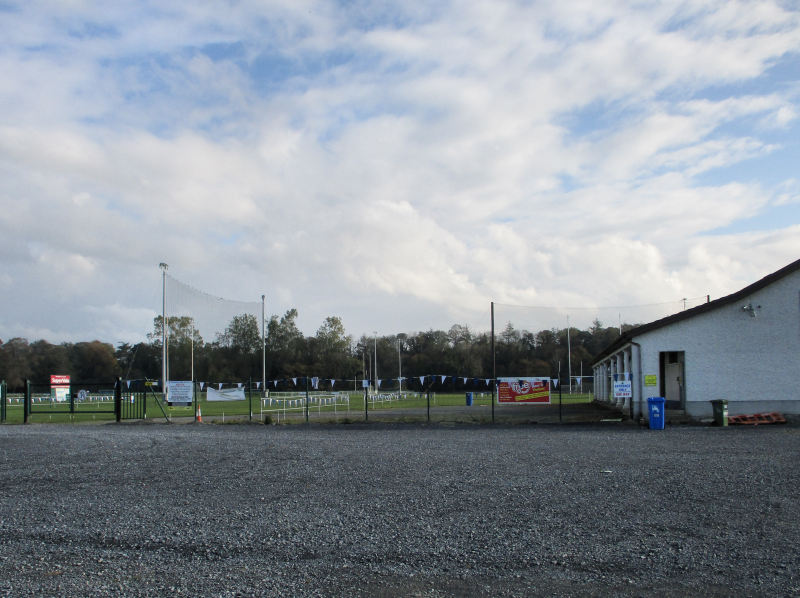
Thomastown Sports Ground, Grennan

Thomastown GAA is a Gaelic Athletic Association club located in Thomastown, County Kilkenny, Ireland. The club was founded in 1905 and fields teams in both hurling and Gaelic football.

== Honours ==
=== Hurling ===
- All-Ireland Intermediate Club Hurling Championships: (1) 2024
- Leinster Intermediate Club Hurling Championships: (1) 2023
- All-Ireland Junior Club Hurling Championship: (1) 2013
- Leinster Junior Club Hurling Championship: (1) 2012 Runners-Up 2005
- Kilkenny Senior Hurling Championship: (2) 1946, 2024
- Kilkenny Intermediate Hurling Championship: (1) 1983, 2023
- Kilkenny Junior Hurling Championship: (5) 1927, 1945, 1962, 2005, 2012
- Southern Junior Hurling Championship (7) 1924, 1927, 1945, 1959, 1962, 2004, 2005
- Southern U21B Hurling Championship (1) 2009
- Cahill Cup (Junior): (1) 2005
- Open Draw Championship: (1) 1985
- Kilkenny Minor Hurling Championship: (6) 1941, 1954, 1956, 1959, 1975, 1981
- Kilkenny U21 A Hurling (1): 2022

=== Football ===
- Kilkenny Senior Football Championship: (5) 1981, 1983, 1984, 1985, 2021
- Kilkenny Intermediate Football Championship: (1) 2010
- Kilkenny Junior Football Championship: (2) 1963, 2004
- Open Draw Football: (1) 1984
- Kilkenny U-21 Football Championship: (3) 1980, 1981, 1983
- Minor Football Championship: (9) 1973, 1974, 1975, 1980, 1981, 1982, 2006, 2007, 2008

=== Camogie ===
- Leinster Senior Club Camogie Championships: (2) 2016, 2017
- Kilkenny Senior Camogie Championships: (7) 1952, 2014, 2016, 2017, 2018, 2020, 2022

== Notable players ==
- Jonjo Farrell
- Dan Kennedy
- Paudie Lannon
- Tommy Maher
- Dick O'Hara
- Peter Prendergast
- Ollie Walsh
- Tom Walsh
- Cha Whelan
- John Donnelly
