= Thomastown, County Kilkenny =

Town in County Kilkenny, Ireland

Thomastown Baile Mhic Andáin (Irish)
- Town
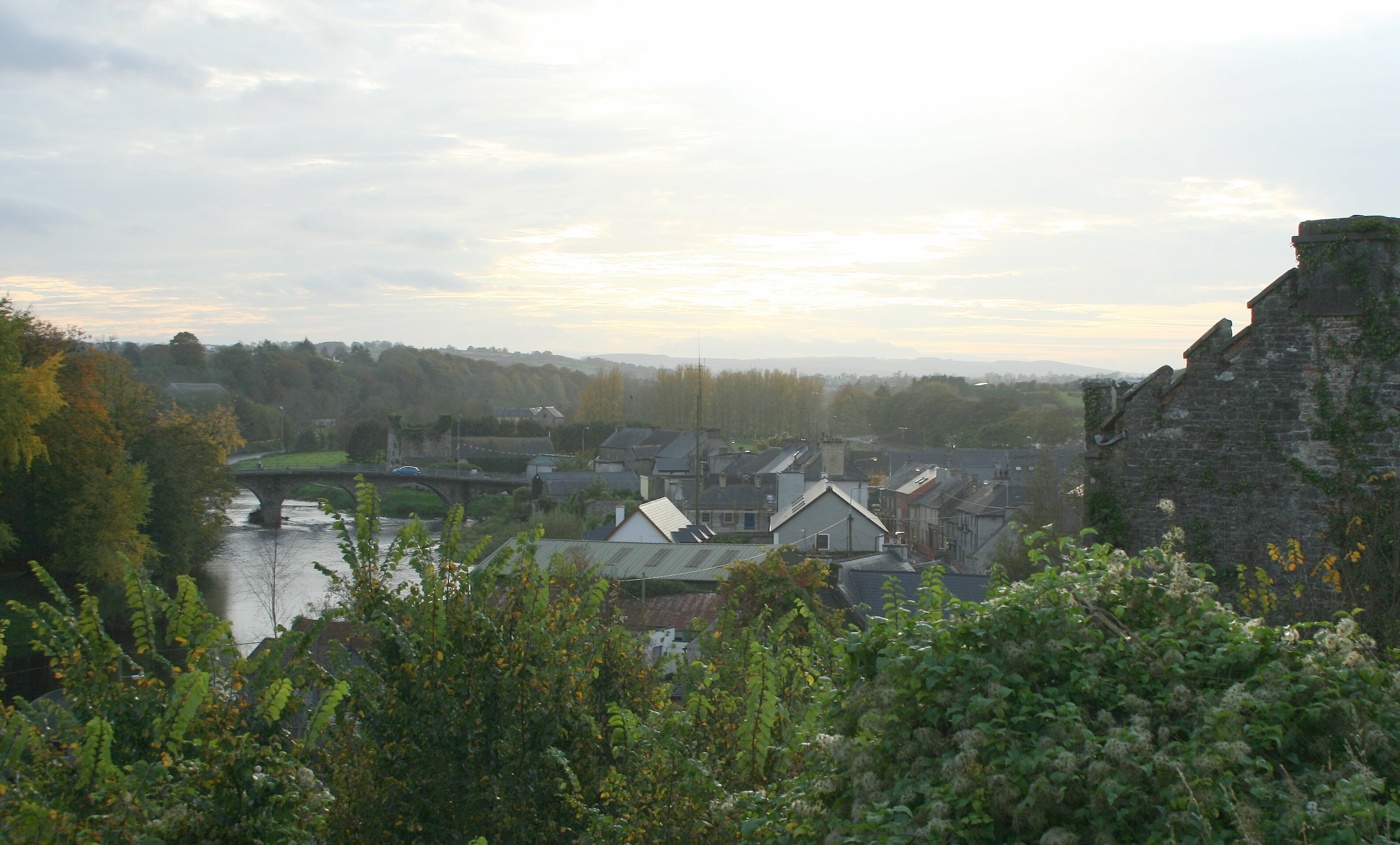
- Thomastown and the River Nore

- Location in Ireland
- Coordinates: 52°31′36″N 7°08′14″W
- Country: Ireland
- Province: Leinster
- County: Kilkenny
- Founded: 13th Century

Population (2022)
  - Total: 2,305
- Time zone: UTC+0 (WET)
  - Summer (DST): UTC-1 (IST (WEST))
- Irish Grid Reference: S585420

Thomastown (Irish: Baile Mhic Andáin), historically known as Grennan, is a town in County Kilkenny in the province of Leinster in the south-east of Ireland. It is a market town along a stretch of the River Nore which is known for its salmon and trout, with a number of historical landmarks in the vicinity. Visitor attractions include Jerpoint Abbey, Kilfane Glen gardens, and Mount Juliet Golf Course. The town is in a civil parish of the same name. As of the 2022 census, Thomastown had a population of 2,305, making the town the third most populous in the county.

== Location ==
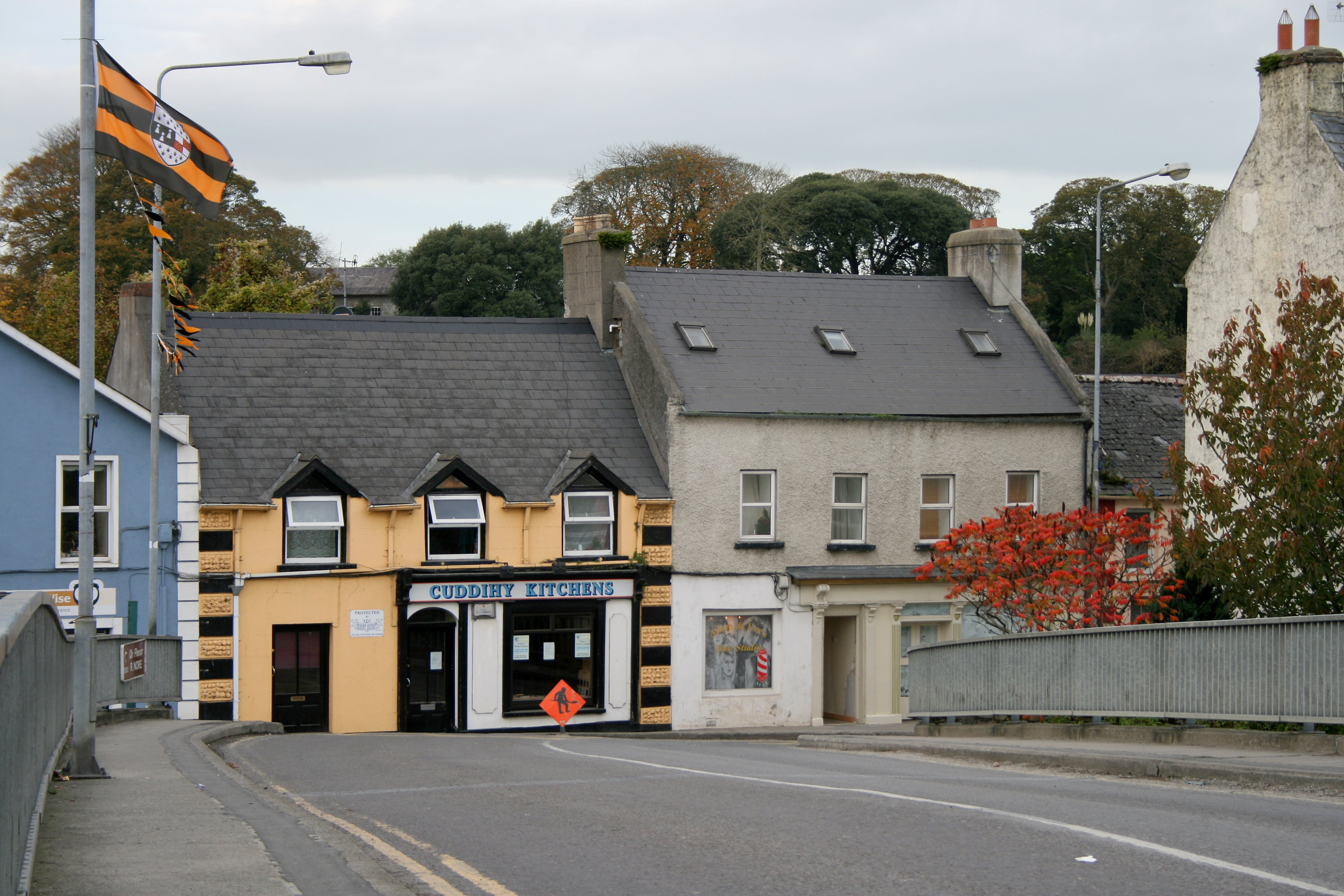
The bridge over the River Nore.

The town is situated at a bridging point on the River Nore 17 kilometres (11 mi) from the city of Kilkenny. The R448 Naas–Waterford road passes through Thomastown and the town is serviced by buses and has a railway station.

It is part of the local electoral area of Callan–Thomastown for elections to Kilkenny County Council.

Historical population
Year	Pop.	±%
1821	2,105	—
1831	2,871	+36.4%
1841	2,348	−18.2%
1851	1,794	−23.6%
1861	1,426	−20.5%
1871	1,202	−15.7%
1881	1,067	−11.2%
1891	970	−9.1%
1901	909	−6.3%
1911	959	+5.5%
1926	746	−22.2%
1936		—
1946		—
1951		—
1956		—
1961		—
1966		—
1971		—
1981	1,308	—
1986	1,465	+12.0%
1991	1,487	+1.5%
1996	1,581	+6.3%
2002	1,600	+1.2%
2006	1,837	+14.8%
2011	2,273	+23.7%
2016	2,445	+7.6%
2022	2,305	−5.7%

== History ==
The town was founded in the 13th century on an important crossing point by an Anglo-Norman mercenary from Wales, Thomas FitzAnthony, replacing the earlier Irish settlement of Grennan (Irish: Grianán, Sunny Place). It is from FitzAnthony that Thomastown was named. FitzAnthony was granted a large area of land in the region by William Earl Marshall, son-in-law of Strongbow, and became the Seneschal (Governor) of Leinster in the 13th century. He built fortifications at Thomastown, fragments of which can still be seen today, together with nearby Grennan Castle, now in ruins. FitzAnthony died in 1229. Of this castle and the town's walls, the only remains are the towers near each end of the bridge and the remains of a 13th-century church, dedicated to St Mary. The town thrived and had more than 200 burgesses at the end of the 13th century. Thomastown became a small medieval walled town: the first walls were built in 1449. Edward III (twice), Henry VI, Mary I, James I, and James II granted the town royal charters. Under a 1553 charter from Queen Mary I, the burgesses of Thomastown had the right to choose two members of Parliament, a practice they continued until the Acts of Union in 1800.

In 1650 the town was attacked by Oliver Cromwell. Grennan Castle was laid siege to by Cromwell's army and after two days the defending forces surrendered.

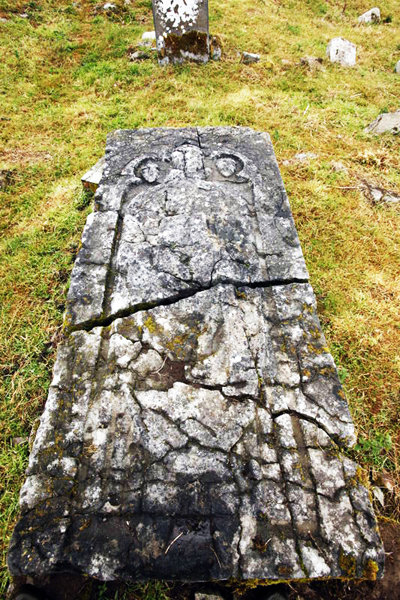
Tomb of St. Nicholas

Local tradition holds that the remains of Saint Nicholas, the 3rd century Anatolian bishop, lie in the vicinity of Thomastown in Jerpoint Park. A grave slab with the carved heads of three people at the ruined Church of St. Nicholas, the church itself, and other stones are virtually all that remain of the medieval village of Newtown Jerpoint, which had fallen into ruin by the 17th century. The village of Newtown was adjacent to Jerpoint Abbey, founded in 1183. The abbey had its own gardens, watermills, cemetery, granary, and kitchens, and was home to a group of Irish-Norman Crusaders in the Middle Ages. It was dissolved in 1540. The legend refers to a band of Irish-Norman knights from Jerpoint, who travelled to the Holy Land to take part in the Crusades. On their return to County Kilkenny, it is said they brought St. Nicholas' remains.

== Landmarks ==
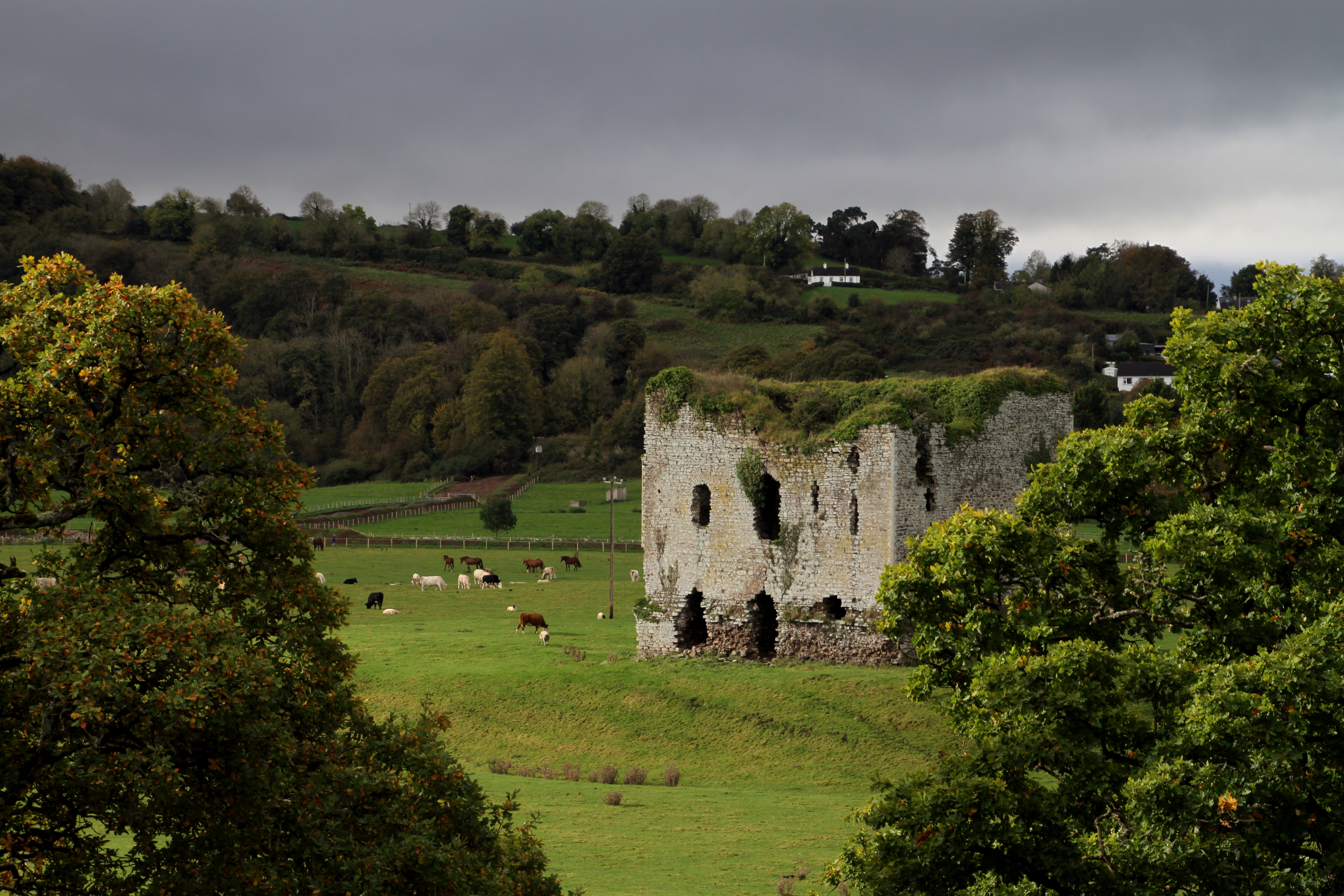
Grennan Castle

Kilfane Glen is a restored historic 1790s garden with a waterfall, woodland walks and cottage orné. The garden is listed as an Irish Heritage Garden, and was awarded assistance in 1993 by the European Union Cultural Commission.

The landscape within the demesne of Kilfane House was developed during the 1790s by the then landowner and his wife, Sir John and Lady Power. Sir Richard Power, twin brother of Sir John also joined in the development of the garden.

The ruins of the 12th century Jerpoint Abbey is located near the town.

The nearby Grennan Castle, an oblong-shaped castle, dates from the 13th century and was erected by Thomas FitzAnthony. The castle was in good repair until the beginning of the 19th century, when parts of it were removed for building purposes.

== Industry ==
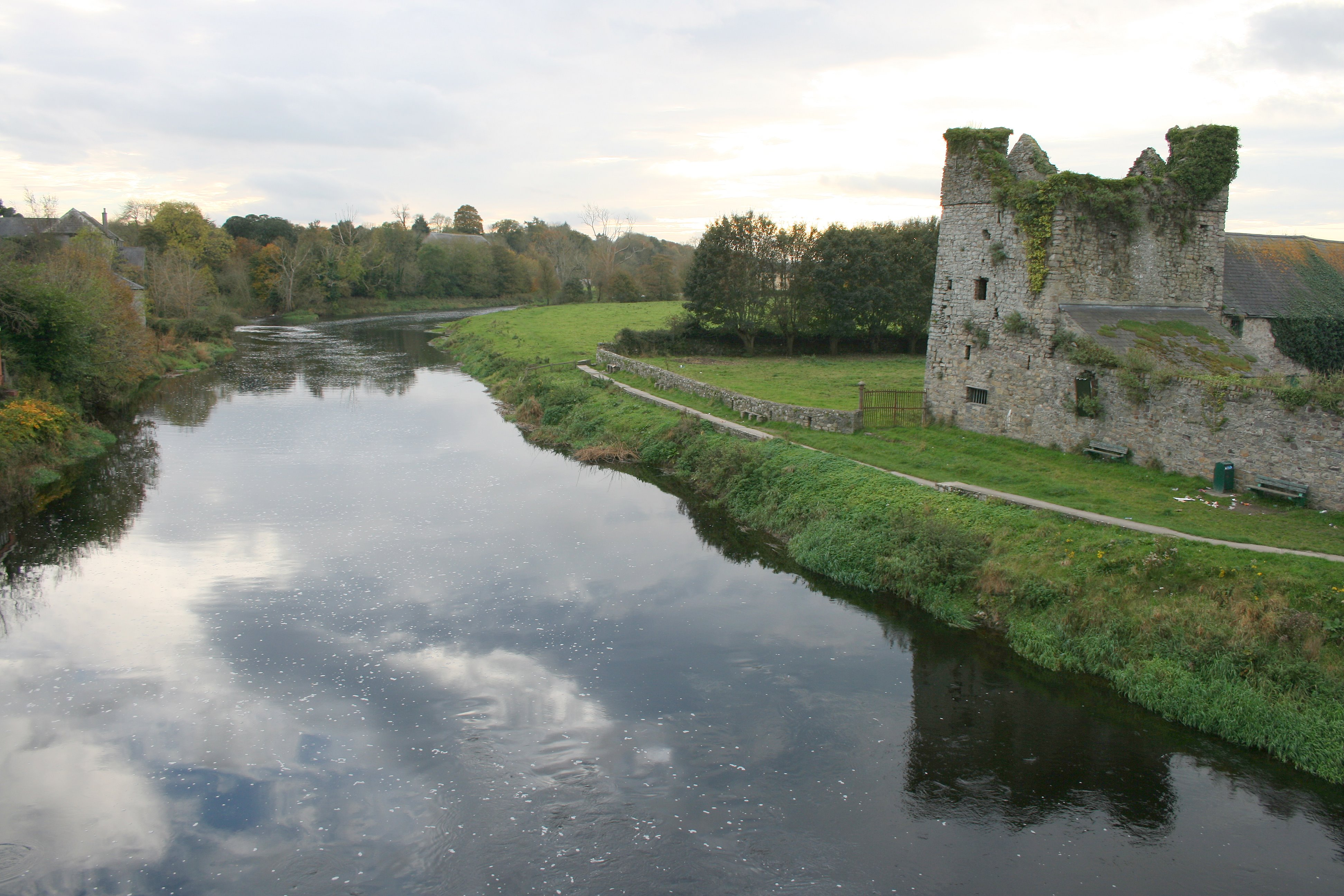
River Nore at Thomastown.

Milling, with mills powered by the waters of the River Nore, was the principal industry in the town until the early 1960s. The mills were Pilsworth's Mills. At one stage there were 12 water-powered mills, for grain and cloth, working in the parish. The last working mill in Thomastown closed in 1963. This mill is now the site of Grennan Mill Craft School. Several mill buildings in good condition can be seen upstream from the bridge.

For centuries there was an important boat trade to carry produce to and from the port of New Ross. It went into decline at the end of the 18th century.

== Transport ==
=== Road ===
The R448 Naas–Waterford road passes through Thomastown where it crosses the R700 regional road. Meanwhile, the R703 road connects the town with Graiguenamagh and Ballymurphy, County Carlow.

=== Rail ===
The town is connected to the Irish railway network on the Dublin-Waterford railway line via Kilkenny. Thomastown railway station opened on 12 May 1848.

=== Bus ===
In May 2026, Bus Éireann route 4 (Waterford – Carlow – Dublin – Dublin Airport) was discontinued. As a result, the previous local Bus Éireann route, route 365 to Waterford via Knocktopher, was extended to Carlow. Bus Eireann route 73, from Waterford to Athlone, also stops in the area. TFI Local link service 882, from New Ross to Kilkenny, also serves Thomastown.

== People ==
Dysart Castle close to Thomastown is reputed to have been the birthplace of the influential Irish philosopher Bishop George Berkeley. Thomastown was the birthplace of the Texas empresario James Hewetson. Born in Kilmurry, Mildred Anne Butler (1858–1941) was an artist associated with the Newlyn School, she worked in watercolour and oil of landscape, genre and animal subjects. Butler spent most of her life at her family home in Kilmurry, Thomastown. The house previously belonged to the Bushe family, whose most distinguished member was Charles Kendal Bushe, Lord Chief Justice of Ireland, who was born at Kilmurry in 1767.

A bronze statue of Ollie Walsh, a Thomastown hurler, stands in Mill Street. Monsignor Tommy Maher played hurling with the local club Thomastown and with the Kilkenny senior inter-county team in the 1940s and coached Kilkenny to seven senior All-Ireland titles between 1957 and 1978. Tom Walsh played hurling with Thomastown and Kilkenny's senior inter-county team in the 1960s.

British songwriter and guitarist John Martyn lived in Thomastown from 1998 until his death in 2009.

Victoria Cross recipient William Dowling was born in Thomastown.

== Sport ==
Kayaking (canoeing) and fishing are common on the River Nore which leads to the village of Inistioge. The Thomastown Paddlers Canoe Club providing training on the river. The local Gaelic Athletic Association club, Thomastown GAA, was founded in 1905. Thomastown also has soccer and athlethics clubs. Teams from the local secondary school, Grennan College, have won a number of national soccer titles.

== See also ==
- List of towns and villages in Ireland
- Thomastown (Parliament of Ireland constituency)
