= List of Kilkenny inter-county hurlers =

This is an incomplete list of hurlers who have played at senior level for the Kilkenny county team.

== A ==
Name	Born	Died	Club	All-Ireland SHC titles	Leinster SHC titles
Ger Aylward	1992		Glenmore		

== B ==
Name	Born	Died	Club	All-Ireland SHC titles	Leinster SHC titles
Peter Barry	1974		James Stephens		
Jim Bennett	1944		Bennettsbridge		
Canice Brennan	1972		Conahy Shamrocks	2000	
Eddie Brennan	1978		Graigue-Ballycallan	7 - (2000, 2002, 2003, 2006, 2007, 2008, 2009)	8 - (2000, 2001, 2002, 2003, 2005, 2006, 2007, 2008)
Kieran Brennan	1957		Conahy Shamrocks		
Martin Brennan	1946		Erin's Own		
Mick Brennan	1950		Erin's Own		
Nickey Brennan	1953		Conahy Shamrocks		
Cillian Buckley	1992		Dicksboro	2012	2014
Seán Buckley	1938		St. Lachtain's		
Denis Byrne			Graigue-Ballycallan		
Ned Byrne	1948		James Stephens		

== C ==
Name	Born	Died	Club	All-Ireland SHC titles	Leinster SHC titles
D. J. Carey	1978		Young Irelands	5 - (1992, 1993, 2000, 2002, 2003)	10 - (1991, 1992, 1993, 1998, 1999, 2000, 2001, 2002, 2003, 2005)
Ted Carroll	1939	1995	Lisdowney		
Charlie Carter	1970		Young Irelands		
Séamus Cleere	1940		Bennettsbridge		
Seán Clohessy	1931		Tullaroan		
Brian Cody	1954		James Stephens	5 - (1974, 1975, 1979, 1982, 1983)	8 - (1973, 1974, 1975, 1978, 1979, 1982, 1983, 1986)
Andy Comerford	1972		O'Loughlin Gaels		
Martin Comerford	1978		O'Loughlin Gaels		
Martin Coogan	1940		Erin's Own		
Mick Crotty	1945		James Stephens		
Aidan Cummins	1979		Ballyhale Shamrocks		
Frank Cummins	1947		Blackrock		

== D ==
Name	Born	Died	Club	All-Ireland SHC titles	Leinster SHC titles
J.J. Delaney	1982		Fenians		
P.J. Delaney	1973		Fenians		
Pat Delaney	1942	2013	Fenains		
Pa Dillon	1938	2013	St. Lachtain's		
Jim Dermody			Tullaroan & Threecastles		
Joe Dermody	1973		St. Lachtain's		
Jim Donegan			Tullaroan		
Claus Dunne	1944		Mooncoin		

== F ==
Name	Born	Died	Club	All-Ireland SHC titles	Leinster SHC titles
Colin Fennelly	1989		Ballyhale Shamrocks		
Ger Fennelly	1954		Ballyhale Shamrocks		
Kevin Fennelly	1955		Ballyhale Shamrocks		
Liam Fennelly	1958		Ballyhale Shamrocks	3 - (1982, 1983, 1992)	6 - (1982, 1983, 1986, 1987, 1991, 1992)
Michael Fennelly	1985		Ballyhale Shamrocks	1 - (2007)	2 - (2007, 2008)
Billy Fitzpatrick	1954		Fenians		
James "Cha" Fitzpatrick	1985		Ballyhale Shamrocks	3 - (2006, 2007, 2008)	3 - (2006, 2007, 2008)
Aidan Fogarty	1982		Emeralds		

== G ==
Name	Born	Died	Club	All-Ireland SHC titles	Leinster SHC titles
Dick Grace	1890	1974	Tullaroan		
Paddy Grace	1917	1984	Dicksboro		
Stephen Grehan	1971		Fenians		

== H ==
Name	Born	Died	Club	All-Ireland SHC titles	Leinster SHC titles
Pat Hayden	1916	1979	Éire Óg		
Denis Heaslip	1934		Ballyhale Shamrocks		
Christy Heffernan	1957		Glenmore		
Ger Henderson	1954		Fenians		
John Henderson	1957		Fenians		
Pat Henderson	1943		Fenians		
Bill Hennessy			Tullaroan		
Joe Hennessy	1956		James Stephens		
Noel Hickey	1980		Dunnamaggin		
Tom Hickey	1975		Dunnamaggin		
Brian Hogan	1981		O'Loughlin Gaels		
Joey Holden	1990		Ballyhale Shamrocks		2014
Frank Holohan	1957		Ballyhale Shamrocks		
John Hoyne	1978		Graigue-Ballycallan		

== J ==
Name	Born	Died	Club	All-Ireland SHC titles	Leinster SHC titles
Paddy Johnston	1933	2001			
Kieran Joyce	1987		Rower-Inistioge		2014

== K ==
Name	Born	Died	Club	All-Ireland SHC titles	Leinster SHC titles
Michael Kavanagh	1979		St. Lachtain's		
Pat Kavanagh	1945		Rower-Inistioge	1969	
Eddie Keher	1941		Rower-Inistioge	1963, 1967, 1969, 1972, 1974, 1975	1963, 1964, 1966, 1967, 1969, 1971, 1972, 1973, 1974, 1975
Mark Kelly	1990		O'Loughlin Gaels		2014
Mickey Kelly	1929	2011	Bennettsbridge		
Eamonn Kennedy	1972		Dunnamaggin		
Liam Keoghan	1968		Tullaroan	1993	1993, 1998
John Kinsella	1947		Bennettsbridge		

== L ==
Name	Born	Died	Club	All-Ireland SHC titles	Leinster SHC titles
Pat Lalor	1948		Bennettsbridge		
Eoin Larkin	1984		James Stephens		
Paddy Larkin	1906	1976	James Stephens/Tullaroan		
Phil Larkin	1941		James Stephens		
Philly Larkin			James Stephens		
Mick Lawler			Coon		
Jim Lynch	1943		Mooncoin		
Derek Lyng	1978		Emeralds		

== M ==
Name	Born	Died	Club	All-Ireland SHC titles	Leinster SHC titles
John Maher	1977		St. Martin's		
Mark Marnell			Tullaroan	1947	1947, 1950, 1953
Tom McCormack	1953		James Stephens		
Brian McEvoy	1974		James Stephens		
James McGarry	1971		Bennettsbridge		
Johnny McGovern	1933		Bennettsbridge		
Paddy Moran	1939		Bennettsbridge		
Paddy Mullally	1976		Glenmore		
Richie Mullally	1978		Glenmore		
Eoin Murphy	1990		Glenmore	2011, 2012, 2014	2011, 2014
Paul Murphy	1989		Danesfort	2011, 2012,2014	2011, 2014
Willie Murphy			Rower-Inistioge		

== N ==
Name	Born	Died	Club	All-Ireland SHC titles	Leinster SHC titles
Paddy Neary	1956		James Stephens		

== O ==
Name	Born	Died	Club	All-Irelan SHC titles	Leinster SHC titles
Liam O'Brian	1950		James Stephens		
Eddie O'Connor	1964		Glenmore		
Willie O'Connor	1967		Glenmore		
Pat O'Neill	1971		Young Irelands		
Nicky Orr	1947		Fenians		

== P ==
Name	Born	Died	Club	All-Ireland SHC titles	Leinster SHC titles
Conor Phelan	1983		Clara		
John Power	1966		John Locke's		
John Power	1992		Carrickshock	2014	2014
Richie Power	1957		Carrickshock		
Richie Power	1985		Carrickshock		
Paddy Prendergast	1958		Clara		
Peter Prendergast			Thomastown	1947	1947, 1950
Billy Purcell	1961		Fenians		
Kieran Purcell	1945		Windgap		

== R ==
Name	Born	Died	Club	All-Ireland SHC titles	Leinster SHC titles
Eoin Reid	1985		Ballyhale Shamrocks		
Richie Reid	1957		Ballyhale Shamrocks		
T.J. Reid	1987		Ballyhale Shamrocks		
Michael Rice	1984		Carrickshock		
Jack Rochford	1882	1953	Three Castles, Tullaroan, Erin's Own	1904, 1905, 1907, 1909, 1911, 1912, 1911	1903, 1904, 1905, 1907, 1909, 1911, 1912, 1913, 1916
Adrian Ronan	1970		Graigue-Ballycallan		
Matt Ruth	1987		St. Patrick's		
Matthew Ruth			James Stephens		
James Ryall	1980		Graigue-Ballycallan	2002, 2003, 2004, 2006, 2007, 2008, 2009	2002, 2003, 2004, 2006, 2007, 2008, 2009, 2010
Harry Ryan	1957		Clara		
Lester Ryan			Clara		
Lester Ryan	1988		Clara	2014	2014
P. J. Ryan	1977		Fenians		

== S ==
Name	Born	Died	Club	All-Ireland SHC titles	Leinster SHC titles
Henry Shefflin	1979		Ballyhale Shamrocks	10 - (2000, 2002, 2003, 2006, 2007, 2008, 2009, 2011, 2012, 2014)	13 - (1999, 2000, 2001, 2002, 2003, 2005, 2006, 2007, 2008, 2009, 2010, 2011, 2014)
Liam Simpson	1966		Bennettsbridge		
Noel Skehan	1945		Bennettsbridge	9 - (1963, 1967, 1969, 1972, 1974, 1975, 1979, 1982, 1983)	14 - (1963, 1964, 1966, 1967, 1969, 1971, 1972, 1973, 1974, 1975, 1978, 1979, 1982, 1983)

== T ==
Name	Born	Died	Club	All-Ireland SHC titles	Leinster SHC titles
John Teehan			St. Lachtain's		
Jim Treacy	1943		Bennettsbridge		
Jackie Tyrrell	1982		James Stephens	4 - (2006, 2007, 2008, 2009)	5 - (2005, 2006, 2007, 2008, 2009, 2010)

== W ==
Name	Born	Died	Club	All-Ireland SHC titles	Leinster SHC titles
Dick Walsh	1878	1958	Mooncoin		
Jimmy Walsh	1911	1977	Carrickshock		
Michael Walsh	1961		Dicksboro		
Ollie Walsh	1937	1996	Thomastown		
Pádraig Walsh	1992		Tullaroan		2014
Tommy Walsh	1983		Tullaroan	7 - (2003, 2006, 2007, 2008, 2009, 2011, 2012)	6 - (2003, 2005, 2006, 2007, 2008, 2009, 2010)
Walter Walsh	1991		Tullogher-Rosbercon	2012	2014
Sim Walton	1880	1966	Tullaroan		
Cha Whelan					
