= List of Kilkenny senior hurling team captains =

This article lists players who have captained the Kilkenny county hurling team in the Leinster Senior Hurling Championship and the All-Ireland Senior Hurling Championship. The captain is chosen from the club that has won the Kilkenny Senior Hurling Championship.

== List of captains ==
#	Year	Player	Club	National titles	Provincial titles
	2025	John Donnelly	Thomastown		
	2024	Paddy Deegan	O'Loughlin Gaels		Leinster Hurling Final winning captain
	2023	Eoin Cody	Ballyhale Shamrocks		Leinster Hurling Final winning captain
	2022	Richie Reid	Ballyhale Shamrocks		Leinster Hurling Final winning captain
	2021	Adrian Mullen	Ballyhale Shamrocks		Leinster Hurling Final winning captain
	2020	Colin Fennelly	Ballyhale Shamrocks		Leinster Hurling Final winning captain
	2019	T. J. Reid	Ballyhale Shamrocks		
	2018	Cillian Buckley	Dicksboro		
	2017	Mark Bergin	O'Loughlin Gaels		
	2016	Shane Prendergast	Clara		Leinster Hurling Final winning captain
	2015	Joey Holden	Ballyhale Shamrocks	All-Ireland Hurling Final winning captain	Leinster Hurling Final winning captain
	2014	Lester Ryan	Clara	All-Ireland Hurling Final winning captain	Leinster Hurling Final winning captain
	2013	Colin Fennelly	Ballyhale Shamrocks		
	2012	Eoin Larkin	James Stephens	All-Ireland Hurling Final winning captain	
	2011	Brian Hogan	O'Loughlin Gaels	All-Ireland Hurling Final winning captain	Leinster Hurling Final winning captain
	2010	T. J. Reid^{1}	Ballyhale Shamrocks		Leinster Hurling Final winning captain
	2009	Michael Fennelly^{2}	Ballyhale Shamrocks	All-Ireland Hurling Final winning captain	
	2008	James 'Cha' Fitzpatrick	Ballyhale Shamrocks	All-Ireland Hurling Final winning captain	Leinster Hurling Final winning captain
	2007	Henry Shefflin	Ballyhale Shamrocks	All-Ireland Hurling Final winning captain	Leinster Hurling Final winning captain
	2006	Jackie Tyrell	James Stephens	All-Ireland Hurling Final winning captain	Leinster Hurling Final winning captain
	2005	Peter Barry	James Stephens		Leinster Hurling Final winning captain
	2004	Martin Comerford	O'Loughlin Gaels		
	2003	D.J. Carey	Young Irelands	All-Ireland Hurling Final winning captain	Leinster Hurling Final winning captain
		Charlie Carter	Young Irelands		
	2002	Andy Comerford	O'Loughlin Gaels	All-Ireland Hurling Final winning captain	Leinster Hurling Final winning captain
	2001	Denis Byrne	Graigue-Ballycallan		Leinster Hurling Final winning captain
	2000	Willie O'Connor	Glenmore	All-Ireland Hurling Final winning captain	Leinster Hurling Final winning captain
	1999	Denis Byrne	Graigue-Ballycallan		Leinster Hurling Final winning captain
	1998	Tom Hickey	Dunnamaggin		Leinster Hurling Final winning captain
	1997	D.J. Carey	Young Irelands		
	1996	Michael Phelan	Glenmore		
	1995	Bill Hennessy	Tullaroan		
	1994	Michael Walsh	Dicksboro		
	1993	Eddie O'Connor	Glenmore	All-Ireland Hurling Final winning captain	Leinster Hurling Final winning captain
	1992	Liam Fennelly	Ballyhale Shamrocks	All-Ireland Hurling Final winning captain	Leinster Hurling Final winning captain
	1991	Christy Heffernan	Glenmore		Leinster Hurling Final winning captain
		1990	Seán Fennelly	Ballyhale Shamrocks	
	1989	Kevin Fennelly	Ballyhale Shamrocks		
	1988	Liam Walsh	Glenmore		
	1987	Paddy Prendergast	Clara		Leinster Hurling Final winning captain
	1986	Frank Holohan	Ballyhale Shamrocks		
	1985	Kieran Brennan	Conahy Shamrocks		
	1984	Liam Fennelly	Ballyhale Shamrocks		
	1983	Liam Fennelly	Ballyhale Shamrocks	All-Ireland Hurling Final winning captain	Leinster Hurling Final winning captain
	1982	Brian Cody	James Stephens	All-Ireland Hurling Final winning captain	Leinster Hurling Final winning captain
	1981	Maurice Mason	Ballyhale Shamrocks		
	1980	Richie Reid	Ballyhale Shamrocks		
	1979	Ger Fennelly	Ballyhale Shamrocks	All-Ireland Hurling Final winning captain	Leinster Hurling Final winning captain
	1978	Ger Henderson	Fenians		Leinster Hurling Final winning captain
	1977	Liam 'Chunky' O'Brien	James Stephens		
	1976	Phil 'Fan' Larkin	James Stephens		
	1975	Billy Fitzpatrick	Fenians	All-Ireland Hurling Final winning captain	Leinster Hurling Final winning captain
	1974	Nicky Orr	Fenians	All-Ireland Hurling Final winning captain	Leinster Hurling Final winning captain
	1973	Pat Delaney	Fenians		Leinster Hurling Final winning captain
	1972	Noel Skehan	Bennettsbridge	All-Ireland Hurling Final winning captain	Leinster Hurling Final winning captain
	1971	Pat Henderson	Fenians		Leinster Hurling Final winning captain
	1970	Mick Crotty	James Stephens		
	1969	Eddie Keher	Rower-Inistioge	All-Ireland Hurling Final winning captain	Leinster Hurling Final winning captain
	1968	Jim Bennett	Bennettsbridge		
	1967	Jim Treacy	Bennettsbridge	All-Ireland Hurling Final winning captain	Leinster Hurling Final winning captain
	1966	Jim Lynch	Mooncoin		Leinster Hurling Final winning captain
	1965	Paddy Moran	Bennettsbridge		
	1964	Seán Buckley	St. Lachtain's		
	1963	Séamus Cleere	Bennettsbridge	All-Ireland Hurling Final winning captain	Leinster Hurling Final winning captain
	1962	Alfie Hickey	St. Lachtain's		
	1961	Séamus Cleere	Bennettsbridge		
	1960	Mickey Kelly	Bennettsbridge		
	1959	Seán Clohessy	Tullaroan		Leinster Hurling Final winning captain
	1958	Mick Kenny	John Locke's		
	1957	Mickey Kelly	Bennettsbridge	All-Ireland Hurling Final winning captain	Leinster Hurling Final winning captain
	1956	Paddy Buggy	Bennettsbridge		
	1955	Paddy Buggy	Slieverue		
	1954	Dan Kennedy	Bennettsbridge		
	1953	Johnny McGovern	Bennettsbridge		
	1952		Carrickshock		
	1951		Dicksboro		
	1950	Mick Kenny	Graigue		Leinster Hurling Final winning captain
	1949	Paddy Malone	Tullaroan		
	1948		Éire Óg		
	1947	Dan Kennedy	Thomastown	All-Ireland Hurling Final winning captain	Leinster Hurling Final winning captain
	1946	Jack Mulcahy	Éire Óg		Leinster Hurling Final winning captain
	1945	Peter Blanchfield	Éire Óg		Leinster Hurling Final winning captain
	1944				
	1943	Jimmy Walsh	Carrickshock		Leinster Hurling Final winning captain
	1942	Jimmy Walsh	Carrickshock		
	1941				
	1940	Jim Langton	Éire Óg		Leinster Hurling Final winning captain
	1939	Jimmy Walsh	Carrickshock	All-Ireland Hurling Final winning captain	Leinster Hurling Final winning captain
	1938	Paddy Larkin	James Stephens		
	1937	Jack Duggan	Mooncoin		Leinster Hurling Final winning captain
	1936	Paddy Larkin	James Stephens		Leinster Hurling Final winning captain
	1935	Lory Meagher	Tullaroan	All-Ireland Hurling Final winning captain	Leinster Hurling Final winning captain
	1934	Lory Meagher	Tullaroan		Leinster Hurling Final winning captain
	1933	Eddie Doyle	Mooncoin	All-Ireland Hurling Final winning captain	Leinster Hurling Final winning captain
	1932	Jimmy Walsh	Carrickshock	All-Ireland Hurling Final winning captain	Leinster Hurling Final winning captain
	1931	Lory Meagher	Tullaroan		Leinster Hurling Final winning captain
	1930				
	1929	Wattie Dunphy	Mooncoin		Leinster Hurling Final winning captain
	1928				
	1927	John Roberts	Dicksboro		
	1926	Dick Grace	Tullaroan		Leinster Hurling Final winning captain
	1925	Dick Grace	Tullaroan		Leinster Hurling Final winning captain
	1924				
	1923	Wattie Dunphy	Mooncoin		Leinster Hurling Final winning captain
	1922	Wattie Dunphy	Mooncoin	All-Ireland Hurling Final winning captain	Leinster Hurling Final winning captain
	1921	Dick Grace	Tullaroan		
	1920	Dick Grace	Tullaroan		
	1919	Dick Grace	Tullaroan		
	1918				
	1917	Sim Walton	Tullaroan		
	1916	Sim Walton	Tullaroan		Leinster Hurling Final winning captain
	1915				
	1914	Dick 'Drug' Walsh	Mooncoin		
	1913	Dick 'Drug' Walsh	Mooncoin	All-Ireland Hurling Final winning captain	Leinster Hurling Final winning captain
	1912	Sim Walton	Tullaroan	All-Ireland Hurling Final winning captain	Leinster Hurling Final winning captain
	1911	Sim Walton	Tullaroan	All-Ireland Hurling Final winning captain	Leinster Hurling Final winning captain
	1910				
	1909	Dick 'Drug' Walsh	Mooncoin	All-Ireland Hurling Final winning captain	Leinster Hurling Final winning captain
	1908				
	1907	Dick 'Drug' Walsh	Mooncoin	All-Ireland Hurling Final winning captain	Leinster Hurling Final winning captain
	1906	Dick 'Drug' Walsh	Mooncoin		
	1905	D.J. Stapleton	Erin's Own	All-Ireland Hurling Final winning captain	Leinster Hurling Final winning captain
	1904	Jer Doheny	Tullaroan	All-Ireland Hurling Final winning captain	Leinster Hurling Final winning captain
	1903	Mick Dalton	Mooncoin		Leinster Hurling Final winning captain
	1902	Jer Doheny	Tullaroan		
	1901				
	1900	Dick 'Manager' Walsh	Mooncoin		Leinster Hurling Final winning captain
	1899				
	1898	Ned Hennessy	Threecastles		Leinster Hurling Final winning captain
	1897	Jackie Walsh	Tullaroan		Leinster Hurling Final winning captain
	1896	Joe Sweeney	Confederation		
	1895	James Grace	Tullaroan		Leinster Hurling Final winning captain
	1894				
	1893	Dan Whelan	Confederation		Leinster Hurling Final winning captain
	1892				
	1891				
	1890				
	1889				
	1888	John Quinn	Mooncoin		Leinster Hurling Final winning captain

== Notes ==
1. Reid was appointed captain although he had not yet nailed down a starting place on the Kilkenny starting fifteen. If he did not line out his brother, Eoin Reid was to act as captain. If neither Reid lined out Henry Shefflin would be the stand-by captain.
2. Fennelly was appointed captain although he had not yet nailed down a place on the Kilkenny starting fifteen. Henry Shefflin was appointed vice-captain and deputised when Fennelly was not playing.
