= 1957 All-Ireland Senior Hurling Championship =

Championship details
- Dates: 14 April – 1 September 1957
- Teams: 14

All-Ireland champions
- Winning team: Kilkenny (14th win)
- Captain: Mickey Kelly

All-Ireland Finalists
- Losing team: Waterford
- Captain: Phil Grimes

Provincial champions
- Munster: Waterford
- Leinster: Kilkenny
- Ulster: Not Played
- Connacht: Not Played

Championship statistics
- No. matches played: 14
- Goals total: 84 (6.00 per game)
- Points total: 216 (15.42 per game)
- Top Scorer: Mick Kenny (3–18)
- All-Star Team: See here

The 1957 All-Ireland Senior Hurling Championship was the 71st staging of the All-Ireland hurling championship since its establishment by the Gaelic Athletic Association in 1887. The championship began on 14 April 1957 and ended on 1 September 1957.

Wexford were the defending champions, however, they were defeated in the provincial campaign. Kilkenny won the All-Ireland following a 4–10 to 3–12 defeat of Waterford.

== Rule changes ==
Prior to the start of the championship the Galway county board put down a motion at the Gaelic Athletic Association's (GAA) annual congress seeking immediate entry to the Leinster championship. Since 1922 Galway's hurlers had no competition in the Connacht championship and, as a result, they gained automatic entry to the All-Ireland semi-final every year. This format was seen as hindering the team's chances, however, by being included in the Leinster championship Galway could possibly have more competitive championship games every year. The motion at congress was eventually withdrawn and the existing format remained intact.

== Teams ==
A total of fourteen teams contested the championship, including all of the teams that participated in the 1956 championship. Kerry returned to the championship after a prolonged absence.

=== Team summaries ===
Team	Colours	Grounds	Most recent success		
Team	Colours	Grounds	All-Ireland	Provincial	League
Clare	Saffron and blue	Cusack Park	1914	1932	1945–46
Cork	Red and white	Cork Athletic Grounds	1954	1956	1952–53
Dublin	Blue and navy	Parnell Park	1938	1952	1938–39
Galway	Maroon and white	Pearse Stadium	1923		1950–51
Kerry	Green and gold	Austin Stack Park	1891	1891	
Kilkenny	Black and amber	Nowlan Park	1947	1953	1932–33
Laois	Blue and white	O'Moore Park	1949	1949	
Limerick	Green and white	Gaelic Grounds	1940	1955	1946–47
Meath	Green and yellow	Páirc Tailteann			
Offaly	Green, white and gold	St. Brendan's Park			
Tipperary	Blue and gold	Semple Stadium	1951	1951	1956–57
Waterford	White and blue	Walsh Park	1948	1948	
Westmeath	Maroon and white	Cusack Park			
Wexford	Purple and gold	Wexford Park	1956	1956	1955–56

== Provincial championships ==
=== Leinster Senior Hurling Championship ===
First round

14 April 1957 First round	Westmeath	3–07 – 4–02	Meath	Cusack Park, Mullingar
	J McGrath 0–5, B McMahon 1–1, J Casey 1–0, E Wallace 1–0, J Graham 0–1.		M Cullen 2–0, M Lenehan 1–1, J Kelly 1–0, M Regan 0–1.	Referee: P Connell

14 April 1957 First round	Offaly	2–11 – 2–08	Laois	St. Brendan's Park, Birr
	T Errity 1–2, D Breen 0–4, N Magee 1–0, M Spain 0–1, G Nallen 0–1, P Molloy 0–1, B Pyke 0–1.		M Corrigan 1–1, A Dunne 1–0, T Maher 0–2, L Harding 0–2, C Brien 0–1, P Kelly 0–1, P Fitzpatrick 0–1.	Referee: J Langton (Kilkenny)

Second round

12 May 1957 Second round	Offaly	4–05 – 1–03	Westmeath	O'Connor Park, Tullamore
	T Errity 3–3, N McMahon 1–0, G Nallen 0–1, J Spain 0–1.		N Bruer 1–1, B McMahon 0–1, E Wallace 0–1,	Referee: J Howard

Semi-finals

30 June 1957 Semi-final	Dublin	2–08 – 1–11	Kilkenny	Croke Park, Dublin
	K Heffernan 1–0, P McGuirk 1–0, V Bell 0–3, B Boothman 0–2, L Healy 0–2, W Cashin 0–1.		M Kenny 0–7, B O'Dwyer 1–1, D Heaslip 0–1, M Brophy 0–1, J Sutton 0–1.	Attendance: 13,710; Referee: B Smith (Meath)

7 July 1957 Semi-final	Wexford	5–10 – 3–03	Offaly	Nowlan Park, Kilkenny
	N Rackard 2–3, T Flood 1–1, O Gough 0–4, T Ryan 1–0, S Hearne 1–0, J Morrissey 0–1, J Redmond 0–1.		J Brady 1–1, G Nallen 1–0, J Bracken 1–0, T Errity 0–2.	Attendance: 7,000; Referee: J Langton (Kilkenny)

21 July 1957 Semi-final replay	Kilkenny	4–08 – 2–08	Dublin	Nowlan Park, Kilkenny
	S Clohessy 2–1, M Kenny 1–4, D Heaslip 1–1, J Murphy 0–1, J Sutton 0–1.		G Keane 1–1, P Heron 0–4, L Healy 1–0, B Boothman 0–2, K Heffernan 0–1.	Attendance: 18,000; Referee: B Smith (Meath)

Final

4 August 1957 Final	Kilkenny	6–09 – 1–05	Wexford	Croke Park, Dublin
	S Clohessy 2–1, B Dwyer 1–2, D Rockett 1–0, PJ Garvan 1–0, D Heaslip 1–0, M Kenny 0–3, M Brophy 0–1, M Kelly 0–1, J Sutton 0–1.		T Ryan 1–0, S Hearne 0–2, N Rackard 0–1, B Rackard 0–1, M Codd 0–1.	Attendance: 52,077; Referee: B Smith (Meath)

=== Munster Senior Hurling Championship ===
First round

12 May 1957 First round	Cork	4–10 – 2–06	Clare	Gaelic Grounds, Limerick
	T Kelly 2–2, C Ring 1–2, P Barry 1–0, M O'Regan 0–3, F Mahony 0–2, E Goulding 0–1.		J Smyth 0–5, P Jordan 1–0, D Hurley 1–0, J Carney 0–1.	Attendance: 15,000; Referee: M Pollard (Waterford)

26 May 1957 First round	Kerry	2–02 – 8–08	Tipperary	Austin Stack Park, Tralee
	T Hennessy 1–2, W McCarthy 1–0.		L Skelly 4–0, T English 2–2, L Devaney 1–2, P Kenny 1–2, B Hayes 0–2.	Referee: C Conway (Cork)

Semi-final

16 June 1957 Semi-final	Waterford	4–12 – 5–05	Limerick	Cork Athletic Grounds, Cork
	J Kiely 2–1, S Power 1–2, L Guinan 1–2, M Flannelly 0–3, T Cheasty 0–2, J O'Connor 0–1, P Grimes 0–1.		L Moloney 2–0, M Tynan 1–1, D Kelly 1–1, V Cobbe 1–0, R Prendergast 0–1, T McGarry 0–1, T Casey 0–1.	Attendance: 14,589; Referee: M Walsh (Cork)

30 June 1957 Semi-final	Cork	5–02 – 1–11	Tipperary	Gaelic Grounds, Limerick
	P Barry 3–0, T Kelly 1–1, C Ring 1–0, C O'Shea 0–1.		M Maher 1–1, L Devaney 0–3, Jimmy Doyle 0–2, L Skelly 0–2, P Kenny 0–2, T Wall 0–1.	Attendance: 40,847; Referee: M Hayes (Clare)

Final

14 July 1957 Final	Waterford	1–11 – 1–06	Cork	Thurles Sportsfield, Thurles
	P Grimes 0–6, M Flannelly 1–2, L Guinan 0–1, S Power 0–1, D Whelan 0–1.		M O'Regan 1–1, T Kelly 0–1, WJ Daly 0–1, P Healy 0–1, E Goulding 0–1, C O'Shea 0–1.	Attendance: 39,254; Referee: S Gleeson (Limerick)

== All-Ireland Senior Hurling Championship ==
Semi-final

28 July 1957 Semi-final	Waterford	4–12 – 0–11	Galway	Croke Park, Dublin
	P Grimes 0–9, T Cheasty 2–0, E Guinan 1–0, J Kiely 1–0, F Walsh 0–2, S Power 0–1.		J Molloy 0–4, P Egan 0–3, M Murphy 0–1, J Salmon 0–1, W Duffy 0–1, J Quigley 0–1.	Attendance: 28,980; Referee: C McLoughlin

Final

1 September 1957 Final	Kilkenny	4–10 – 3–12	Waterford	Croke Park, Dublin
	M Kenny 2–5, B Dwyer 2–0, M Kelly 0–2, S Clohessy 0–2, D Heaslip 0–1.		P Grimes 1–6, D Whelan 2–2, J Kiely 0–2, F Walsh 0–1, T Cheasty 0–1.	Attendance: 70,594; Referee: S Gleeson (Limerick)

== Championship statistics ==
=== Top scorers ===
Top scorers overall

Rank	Player	Club	Tally	Total	Matches	Average
1	Mick Kenny	Kilkenny	3–19	28	4	7.00
2	Phil Grimes	Waterford	1–22	25	4	6.25
3	Tommy Errity	Offaly	4-07	19	3	6.33
4	Seán Clohessy	Kilkenny	4-04	16	4	4.00
5	Billy Dwyer	Kilkenny	4-03	15	4	3.75
6	Liam Skelly	Tipperary	4-02	14	2	7.00
7	Terry Kelly	Cork	3-04	13	3	4.33
8	Paddy Barry	Cork	4-00	12	3	4.00
8	John Kiely	Waterford	3-03	12	4	3.00
9	Nicky Rackard	Wexford	2-04	10	2	5.00

Top scorers in a single game

Rank	Player	Club	Tally	Total	Opposition
1	Liam Skelly	Tipperary	4-00	12	Kerry
1	Tommy Errity	Offaly	3-03	12	Westmeath
2	Mick Kenny	Kilkenny	2-05	11	Waterford
3	Paddy Barry	Cork	3-00	9	Tipperary
3	Nicky Rackard	Wexford	2-03	9	Offaly
3	Phil Grimes	Waterford	1-06	9	Kilkenny
3	Phil Grimes	Waterford	0-09	9	Galway
4	Terry Kelly	Cork	2-02	8	Clare
4	Theo English	Tipperary	2-02	8	Kerry
4	Donal Whelan	Waterford	2-02	8	Kilkenny

=== Scoring ===
- Widest winning margin: 19 points
  - Kilkenny 6–9 : 1–5 Wexford (Leinster final, 4 August 1957)
- Most goals in a match: 9
  - Waterford 4–12 : 5–5 Limerick (Munster semi-final, 16 June 1957)
- Most points in a match: 22
  - Kilkenny 4–10 : 3–12 Waterford (All-Ireland final, 1 September 1957)
- Most goals by one team in a match: 6
  - Kilkenny 6–9 : 1–5 Wexford (Leinster final, 4 August 1957)
- Most goals scored by a losing team: 5
  - Limerick 5–5 : 4–12 Waterford (Munster semi-final, 16 June 1957)
- Most points scored by a losing team: 12
  - Waterford 3–12 : 4–10 Kilkenny (All-Ireland final, 1 September 1957)

=== Miscellaneous ===
- The English actor John Gregson joined the Kilkenny team during the parade at the start of the All-Ireland final as part of his role as a hurler in the film Rooney.
- Kerry make their first appearance in the Munster Senior Championship since 1945.

== Sources ==
- Corry, Eoghan, The GAA Book of Lists (Hodder Headline Ireland, 2005).
- Donegan, Des, The Complete Handbook of Gaelic Games (DBA Publications Limited, 2005).
