= Dick Grace (Tullaroan) =

Irish hurler (1890–1974)

Personal information
- Native name: Risteard Grás (Irish)
- Born: 10 August 1890 Tullaroan, County Kilkenny, Ireland
- Died: 1 December 1974 (aged 84) Kilkenny, Ireland

Sport
- Sport: Hurling
- Position: Half-back
Club
- Years: Club
- 1908-1929: Tullaroan
Club titles
- Kilkenny titles: 8
Inter-county
- Years: County
- 1909-1926: Kilkenny
Inter-county titles
- Leinster titles: 8
- All-Irelands: 5

Dick Grace (10 August 1890 – 1 December 1974) was an Irish sportsperson. He played hurling with his local club Tullaroan and was a member of the Kilkenny senior inter-county team from 1909 until 1926. Grace is one of only a handful of players to have won All-Ireland medals in each of three decades.

== Biography ==
Dick Grace was born in Tullaroan, County Kilkenny in 1891. He was educated at the local national school and, in time, would go on to become one of his county’s greatest-ever hurlers. The Graces of Tullaroan were synonymous with both hurling and Gaelic football. Between them the three brothers – Dick, Jack and Pierce - won a total of 15 All-Ireland senior medals – eight in hurling and seven in football.

== Playing career ==
=== Club ===
Grace played his club hurling with his local Tullaroan club and enjoyed much success, winning his first county title in 1910. He added more county titles to his collection in 1911, 1915, 1924 and 1925. At the end of the 20th century Grace was chosen on the Tullaroan Hurling Team of the Century.

=== Inter-county ===
Grace first came to prominence on the inter-county scene for Kilkenny in 1909. That year he came on as a substitute in the All-Ireland final against Tipperary in Cork. The game was a high-scoring one as Tipperary suffered their first defeat in nine All-Ireland final appearances. A 4-6 to 0-12 victory gave Grace his first All-Ireland medal. Kilkenny surrendered their Leinster and All-Ireland crowns in 1910, however, 1911 saw Grace picking up his first Leinster winners’ medal. There was controversy in the All-Ireland final as Kilkenny were destined to play Limerick. On the first occasion the pitch in Cork was water-logged and the game was refixed for Thurles. Limerick pulled out of the replay and the title was awarded to Kilkenny. Limerick defeated Kilkenny in a challenge match later that same year; however, Grace was the one who had collected a second All-Ireland medal. The following year Grace collected a second Leinster medal before lining out in another All-Ireland final. Cork provided the opposition on that occasion in a low-scoring but close game. A 2-1 to 1-3 victory gave Grace a third All-Ireland medal. In 1913 Kilkenny were attempting to make history by capturing their third championship in-a-row. Kilkenny retained their provincial dominance with Walsh collecting a third Leinster title. The All-Ireland final saw ‘the Cats’ square up to Tipperary in the first fifteen-a-side final. Kilkenny had the lead at half-time and only scored a goal in the second-half. They won the game by 2-4 to 1-2 giving Grace a fourth All-Ireland winners’ medal.

Four All-Ireland titles in-a-row proved beyond this Kilkenny team as they were beaten by Laois in 1914. Two years later in 1916 Grace added a fourth Leinster title to his collection as his team defeated Wexford in the provincial decider. The subsequent All-Ireland final saw Kilkenny take on their near rivals Tipperary. In an exciting game which saw Grace and Tommy Shanahan of Tipp being sent off, Kilkenny went five points ahead, however, Tipp bounced back to win the game by 5-4 to 3-2. Kilkenny went into decline following this defeat. The team lost Leinster finals to Dublin in 1917, 1919, 1920 and 1921. The team bounced back in 1922 and Grace won his fifth Leinster title following an eight-point victory over Dublin. This victory allowed ‘the Cats’ to advance to the All-Ireland final where Tipperary were the opponents. With three minutes left in the game Tipp were leading by three points, however, last-minute goals by Paddy Donoghue and Dick Tobin secured a 4-2 to 2-6 victory for Kilkenny. Grace had captured his fifth All-Ireland medal in his third decade as a player. It would be 45 years before Kilkenny would beat Tipp in the championship again. Grace added a sixth Leinster title to his collection in 1923 following another trouncing of Dublin, however, Galway accounted for Kilkenny in the All-Ireland semi-final. Two years late rin 1925 Grace captured a seventh Leinster medal, however, Galway won the day in the All-Ireland semi-final once again. The following year Grace captained Kilkenny to yet another Leinster title, his eighth overall. The subsequent All-Ireland final saw Kilkenny line out against Cork at a snow-covered Croke Park. Cork took the lead at half-time and went on to win the game by 4-6 to 2-0. Following this defeat Grace decided to retire from inter-county hurling.

Sporting positions
Preceded by	Kilkenny Senior Hurling Captain; 1925-1926	Succeeded by John Roberts
