= Paddy Larkin =

Irish hurler

Personal information
- Born: 26 July 1905 Kilkenny, Ireland
- Died: 19 September 1976 (aged 71) Kilkenny, Ireland

Sport
- Sport: Hurling
- Position: Full-back
Clubs
- Years: Club
- James Stephens; Tullaroan; Éire Óg
Club titles
- Kilkenny titles: 5
Inter-county*
Years	County	Apps (scores)
1926–1943	Kilkenny	43 (0-00)
Inter-county titles
- Leinster titles: 9
- All-Irelands: 4
- NHL: 1
- *Inter County team apps and scores correct as of 00:55, 28 June 2013.

Patrick Larkin (26 July 1905 – 19 September 1976) was an Irish hurler who played as a full-back for the Kilkenny senior team, and was the father of Fan Larkin.

Sporting positions
Preceded by Lory Meagher	Kilkenny Senior Hurling Captain; 1936	Succeeded by Jack Duggan
Preceded by Jack Duggan	Kilkenny Senior Hurling Captain; 1938	Succeeded by Jimmy Walsh
Achievements
Preceded by Timmy Ryan (Munster)	Interprovincial Hurling Final winning captain 1936	Succeeded by Mick Mackey (Munster)
