= Jack Duggan (hurler) =

Irish hurler

Personal information
- Native name: Seán Ó Duagáin (Irish)
- Born: 6 November 1902 Farnoge, Mullinavat, County Kilkenny, Ireland
- Died: 17 August 1990 (aged 87) Farnoge, Mullinavat, County Kilkenny, Ireland
- Occupation: Farmer

Sport
- Sport: Hurling
- Position: Centre-forward
Clubs
- Years: Club
- Knockmoylan; Eire Og; Mooncoin; Tullogher; Glenmore
Club titles
- Kilkenny titles: 9
Inter-county
- Years: County
- 1929–1938: Kilkenny
Inter-county titles
- Leinster titles: 6
- All-Irelands: 3
- NHL: 1

John Duggan (6 November 1902 – 17 August 1990) was an Irish hurler. His inter-county career with the Kilkenny senior hurling team lasted from 1929 until 1938.

== Biography ==
Raised in Farnoge, near Mullinavat, County Kilkenny, Duggan was one of nine children born to Denis Duggan, a farmer, and his wife Bridget.

Duggan first came to prominence as a hurler with the Knockmoylan team that won the Kilkenny Junior Championship in 1926, however, the team was later stripped of the title. With the Mooncoin club Duggan won five Kilkenny Senior Championship medals between 1927 and 1938.

Jack played gaelic football with his brother Dinny lining out for Tullogher. They won two Kilkenny Senior Championship medals in 1930 and 1931.

By the late 30s, Jack threw his lot in with another neighbouring parish Glenmore, in a day when there was no parish rule. Along with 5 other Mullinavat men, Duggan played for Glenmore on their 1938 & 1939 Gaelic Football Senior county final wins over Tullogher. Jack lined out at corner-back.

Duggan first played at inter-county level as a member of the Kilkenny junior hurling team in 1928 before making his senior debut the following year. Over the course of the next decade he won three All-Ireland medals and six Leinster Championship medals. An All-Ireland runner-up on three occasions, Duggan was captained the team in 1937.

== Honours ==
Mooncoin

- Kilkenny Senior Hurling Championship (5): 1927, 1928, 1929, 1932, 1936

Tullogher

- Kilkenny Senior Football Championship (2): 1930, 1931

Glenmore

- Kilkenny Senior Football Championship (2): 1938, 1939

Kilkenny

- All-Ireland Senior Hurling Championship (3): 1932, 1933, 1935
- Leinster Senior Hurling Championship (6): 1931, 1932, 1933, 1935, 1936, 1937 (c)
- National Hurling League (1): 1932–33

Sporting positions
Preceded by Paddy Larkin	Kilkenny Senior Hurling Captain; 1937	Succeeded by Paddy Larkin
