= Tom Hickey (hurler) =

Irish sportsperson

Personal information
- Native name: Tomás Ó hIcí (Irish)
- Born: Dunnamaggin, County Kilkenny, Ireland
- Height: 5 ft 9 in (175 cm)

Sport
- Sport: Hurling
- Position: Right corner-back
Club
- Years: Club
- Dunnamaggin
Club titles
- Kilkenny titles: 1
Inter-county
- Years: County
- 1998-1999: Kilkenny
Inter-county titles
- Leinster titles: 2
- All-Irelands: 0
- NHL: 0
- All Stars: 0

Thomas Andrew Hickey (born 30 August 1976) is an Irish sportsperson. He plays hurling with his local club Dunnamaggin and was a member of the Kilkenny senior inter-county team from 1998 until 1999. His brother, Noel, won 9 All-Ireland medals with Kilkenny before he retired himself in 2013.

Sporting positions
Preceded by D. J. Carey	Kilkenny Senior Hurling Captain; 1998	Succeeded by Denis Byrne
