= Paddy Donoghue =

Irish hurler

Personal information
- Native name: Pádraig Ó Donnchú (Irish)
- Born: 13 November 1891 Kilkenny, Ireland
- Died: 18 September 1967 (aged 75) Kilkenny, Ireland
- Occupation: Railway station worker

Sport
- Sport: Hurling
- Position: Left wing-forward
Club
- Years: Club
- Dicksboro
Club titles
- Kilkenny titles: 2
Inter-county
- Years: County
- 1917-1924: Kilkenny
Inter-county titles
- Leinster titles: 2
- All-Irelands: 1

Patrick Donoghue (13 November 1891 – 18 September 1967) was an Irish hurler who played as a left wing-forward for the Kilkenny senior team.

Hackett made his first appearance for the team during the 1917 championship and was a regular member of the starting fifteen until his retirement after the 1924 championship. During that time, he won one All-Ireland medal and two Leinster medals.

At club level, Hackett was a two-time county club championship medalist with Dicksboro.
