= Peter Blanchfield =

Irish hurler

Personal information
- Native name: Peadar de Bluinsín (Irish)
- Born: 18 October 1910 King Street, Kilkenny, Ireland
- Died: 11 November 1959 (aged 49) Dominic Street, Kilkenny, Ireland
- Occupation: Postman
- Height: 5 ft 10 in (178 cm)

Sport
- Sport: Hurling
- Position: Forward
Clubs
- Years: Club
- James Stephens; Tullaroan; Éire Óg
Club titles
- Kilkenny titles: 2
Inter-county
- Years: County
- 1935-1945: Kilkenny
Inter-county titles
- Leinster titles: 7
- All-Irelands: 2

Peter Blanchfield (18 October 1910 – 11 November 1959) was an Irish sportsperson. He played hurling with his local club James Stephens and was a member of the Kilkenny senior inter-county team from 1935 until 1945.

== Playing career ==
=== Club ===
Blanchfield played his club hurling with the famous James Stephens club in Kilkenny and enjoyed much success. He won his first senior county title in 1935. It was the club's first ever victory in a county final. Blanchfield added a second county medal to his collection in 1937.

=== Inter-county ===
Blanchfield first came to prominence on the inter-county scene with Kilkenny in 1935. That year he collected his first Leinster title following a victory over Laois. The subsequent All-Ireland final saw Blanchfield's take on Limerick for the second time in three years. Once again the match was a close one, however, Kilkenny clung on and won by a single point – 2-5 to 2-4. It was Blanchfield's first All-Ireland medal.

In 1936 Blanchfield added a second Leinster medal to his collection before lining out in a second consecutive All-Ireland final. Once again, the two outstanding teams of the decade, Kilkenny and Limerick, were paired together in the championship decider. Limerick were coming into their prime at this stage and gained revenge for the defeats of 1933 and 1935 by trouncing ‘the Cats’ on a score line of 5-6 to 1-5.

Kilkenny bounced back in 1937 with Blanchfield collecting a third Leinster winners' title. The All-Ireland final pitted Kilkenny against Tipperary in the unusual venue of FitzGerald Stadium in Killarney. ‘The Cats’ were definitely on a downward spiral by this stage as they were walloped by 3-11 to 0-3.

In 1939 ‘the Cats’ reclaimed their provincial crown with a victory over reigning All-Ireland champions Dublin. It was Blanchfield's fourth provincial medal of the decade. The subsequent All-Ireland final against Cork has gone down in history as the famous ‘thunder and lightning’ final when a huge downpour interrupted play. In the end victory went to Kilkenny by a single point. It was not the last time that ‘the Cats’ would defeat ‘the Rebels’ by a single point in a final. It was Blanchfield's second All-Ireland medal.

In 1940 Blanchfield added a fifth Leinster medal to his collection after another defeat of Dublin. The All-Ireland final saw Kilkenny and Limerick, the two dominant team of the last decade, take to the field for one final game. Kilkenny had peaked in the final the year before while Limerick were now reaching their prime. A 3-7 to 1-7 defeat for Kilkenny resulted in Blanchfield ending up on the losing side for the third time.

An outbreak of foot-and-mouth disease in the county hampered Kilkenny’s championship hopes for the next few seasons. In spite of this the team bounced back in 1943 with Blanchfield adding a sixth Leinster medal to his already impressive collection. The subsequent All-Ireland semi-final provided what was regarded as the time as the biggest shock in the history of the championship. Antrim had defeated Galway in the All-Ireland quarter-final in, what was described as, a fluke. Antrim proved that their victory was far from lucky as they defeated Blanchfield's side in the subsequent semi-final.

Two years later in 1945 Blanchfield won his seventh and final Leinster medal before lining out in his final All-Ireland final. Tipperary provided the opposition on that occasion. Almost 70,000 people packed into Croke Park to witness a classic encounter, with 5,000 more fans being locked out of the stadium. Tipp took the lead at half-time, however, Kilkenny fought back with three second-half goals. In spite of this Tipp held on to win the game by 5-6 to 3-6. Blanchfield retired from inter-county hurling after this defeat.

Sporting positions
Preceded by	Kilkenny Senior Hurling Captain; 1945	Succeeded by Jack Mulcahy
