= Young Irelands GAA =

Young Irelands GAA or Éire Óg refers to many Gaelic games clubs named in honour of the Young Irelanders.

- Young Irelands GAA (Kilkenny), a sports club in Gowran, Ireland
- Young Irelands GAA (Limerick), a sports club in the Irish city of Limerick
- Éire Óg Anacarty GAA, a sports club in the parish of Anacarty & Donohill, West Tipperary, Ireland
- Éire Óg GAA (Cork), a sports club in Ovens, Muskerry, Ireland
- Éire Óg-Corrachoill CLG, a hurling club based in County Kildare, Ireland
- Éire Óg Craigavon GAA, a sports club in County Armagh
- Éire Óg Greystones GAA, a sports club in Greystones, County Wicklow, Ireland
- Éire Óg GAA (Kilkenny), a defunct sports club in the Irish city of Kilkenny
- Éire Óg GFC (London), a sports club in the London Borough of Haringey
- Nenagh Éire Óg GAA, a sports club in North Tipperary, Ireland
