= Seán Clohessy =

Irish hurler (1931–2019)

Seán Clohosey
Personal information
- Native name: Seán Ó Clochasaigh (Irish)
- Born: 27 October 1931 Tullaroan, County Kilkenny, Ireland
- Died: 6 October 2019 (aged 87) Midleton, Cork, Ireland
- Occupation: Bank official
- Height: 5 ft 11 in (180 cm)

Sport
- Sport: Hurling
- Position: Midfield
Clubs
- Years: Club
- Tullaroan; Young Irelands
Club titles
- Kilkenny titles: 1
Inter-county*
Years	County	Apps (scores)
1953–1963	Kilkenny	19 (14–33)
Inter-county titles
- Leinster titles: 5
- All-Irelands: 2
- NHL: 1
- *Inter County team apps and scores correct as of 17:38, 28 June 2014.

Seán Clohosey (27 October 1931 – 6 October 2019) was an Irish hurler who played for club sides Tullaroan and Young Irelands. He played for the Kilkenny senior hurling team for a decade, during which time he lined out in a variety of positions including left corner-forward, left wing-forward and midfield.

Born in Tullaroan, County Kilkenny, Clohosey first arrived on the inter-county scene at the age of sixteen when he first linked up with the Kilkenny minor team. He made his senior debut during the 1953 championship. During his career Clohosey won two All-Ireland medals, five Leinster medals and one National Hurling League medal. He was an All-Ireland runner-up on one occasion.

Clohosey also represented the Leinster inter-provincial team on a number of occasions, winning one Railway Cup medal. At club level he was a one-time championship medallist with Tullaroan.

His retirement came following Kilkenny's victory over Waterford in the 1963 All-Ireland final.

Clohosey's father, Pat, also enjoyed a length career with Kilkenny.

== Playing career ==
=== Tullaroan ===
Clohessy joined the Tullaroan club at a young age and played in all grades at juvenile and underage levels before eventually joining the club's top adult team in the Kilkenny Senior Championship.

On 31 August 1952, Clohessy lined out at right wing-forward when Tullaroan qualified to play Bennettsbridge in the Kilkenny Senior Championship final. He scored two goals from play but ended on the losing side after suffering a 5-3 to 4-05 defeat.

Clohessy was selected at midfield when Tullaroan qualified for a meeting with Slieverue in the final on 10 October 1954. He was held scoreless and ended the game on the losing side after suffering a 6-05 to 4-03 defeat.

On 2 November 1958, Clohessy was selected at centre-forward when he lined out in a third final. He scored two points from play and claimed a winners' medal after Tullaroan's 1-12 to 3-02 defeat of Bennettsbridge.

=== Kilkenny ===
==== Minor ====
Clohessy was just 16-years-old when he was selected for the Kilkenny minor team for the first time during the 1948 Leinster Championship. He won a Leinster Championship medal as a member of the extended panel on 11 July 1948 following Kilkenny's 5-02 to 3-06 defeat of Offaly in the final. Clohessy was again a member of the extended panel when Kilkenny suffered a 3-08 to 4-02 defeat by Waterford in the All-Ireland final on 5 September 1948.

On 15 May 1949, Clohessy made his first appearance for the Kilkenny minor team. He scored 1-01 from play in a 1-03 to 0-05 defeat of Wexford in the Leinster Championship. Clohessy, who was then based as a bank official in Killorglin, County Kerry, was later dropped from the team due to the difficulty with travel arrangements in getting him to games.

==== Senior ====
Clohessy was added to the Kilkenny senior team during the 1952-53 National League. He made his Leinster Championship debut on 21 June 1953 and scored a point from play in a 3-11 to 4-08 draw with Dublin. Clohessy won a Leinster Championship medal on 19 July 1953 when he again scored a point in the 1-13 to 3-05 defeat of Wexford in the final.

On 2 May 1954, Clohessy lined out at right wing-forward when Kilkenny faced Tipperary in the National League final. He ended the game on the losing side after a 3-10 to 1-04 defeat.

Clohessy lined out in a second Leinster final on 17 July 1955. He top scored for Kilkenny with 1-01 in the 2-07 apiece draw with Wexford. Clohesy was again Kilkenny's top scorer with 1-02 for the replay on 31 July 1955, however, he ended the game on the losing side after a 5-06 to 3-09 defeat.

On 8 July 1956, Clohessy was selected at centre-forward when Kilkenny faced Wexford in a second successive Leinster final. He scored a point from play in the 4-08 to 3-10 defeat.

Clohessy was selected at left corner-forward when he lined out in his second National League final on 12 May 1957. He ended the game on the losing side after a 3-11 to 2-07 defeat by Tipperary. On 4 August 1957, Clohessy won his second Leinster medal after scoring 2-01 in the 6-09 to 1-05 defeat of Wexford in the final. He was again selected at left corner-forward when Kilkenny faced Waterford in the All-Ireland final on 1 September 1957. Clohessy scored two points from play and claimed a winners' medal following the 4-10 to 3-12 victory.

Clohessy was named at left corner-forward when Kilkenny faced Wexford in a fourth successive Leinster final on 27 July 1958. He scored two points from play and claimed a third Leinster medal following the 5-12 to 4-09 victory.

Clohessy was appointed captain of the Kilkenny team for the 1959 season. He won a fourth Leinster medal on 12 July 1959 after captaining the team to a 2-09 to 1-11 defeat of Dublin in the final. On 6 September 1959, Clohessy captained Kilkenny to an All-Ireland final meeting with Waterford. He scored a point from play in the 5-05 to 1-17 draw. Clohessy was again at left wing-forward for the replay on 4 October 1959, however, he ended the game on the losing side after suffering a 3-12 to 1-10 defeat.

On 24 July 1960, Clohessy was selected at midfield when Kilkenny faced Wexford in the Leinster final. He was held scoreless throughout and ended the game on the losing side following a 3-10 to 2-11 defeat.

On 6 May 1962, Clohessy was at full-forward when Kilkenny qualified to play Cork in the National League final. He scored a point from play and claimed a winners' medal following the 1-16 to 1-08 victory and a first league title for Kilkenny since 1933. Clohessy was again at full-forward when Kilkenny faced Wexford in the Leinster final on 22 July 1962. He scored a point from play in the 3-09 to 2-10 defeat.

Clohessy lined out in a ninth Leinster final on 21 July 1963. He scored 1-01 from right wing-forward and claimed a fifth winners' medal after the 2-10 to 0-09 defeat of Dublin. On 1 September 1963, Clohessy lined out at midfield when Kilkenny faced Waterford in the All-Ireland final. He ended the game with a second All-Ireland medal All-Ireland medal after the 4-17 to 6-08 victory.

== Honours ==
=== Team ===
Tullaroan

- Kilkenny Senior Hurling Championship (1): 1958

Kilkenny

- All-Ireland Senior Hurling Championship (2): 1957, 1963
- Leinster Senior Hurling Championship (5): 1953, 1957, 1958, 1959 (c), 1963
- National Hurling League (1): 1961–62

Leinster

- Railway Cup (1): 1956

Sporting positions
Preceded by Mick Kenny	Kilkenny Senior Hurling Captain; 1959	Succeeded by Mickey Kelly
