= Jim Lynch (hurler) =

Irish hurler

Personal information
- Native name: Séamus Ó Loingsigh (Irish)
- Born: 1943 (age 82–83) Mooncoin, County Kilkenny, Ireland
- Height: 6 ft 1 in (185 cm)

Sport
- Sport: Hurling
- Position: Full-back/Full-forward
Club
- Years: Club
- Mooncoin
Club titles
- Kilkenny titles: 1
Inter-county
Years	County	Apps (scores)
1963-1969	Kilkenny	12 (4-01)
Inter-county titles
- Leinster titles: 3
- All-Irelands: 1
- NHL: 1

Jim Lynch (born 1943) is an Irish retired hurler who played as a full-back and as a full-forward for the Kilkenny senior team.

Lynch made his first appearance for the team during the 1964 championship and became a regular player over the next few years. During that time he won one All-Ireland winner's medal, three Leinster winner's medals and one National League winners' medal.

At club level, Lynch enjoyed a successful career with Mooncoin, winning a county club championship winners' medals in 1965.

== Honours ==
Mooncoin

- Kilkenny Senior Hurling Championship: 1965
- Kilkenny Junior Hurling Championship: 1961

Kilkenny

- All-Ireland Senior Hurling Championship: 1967
- Leinster Senior Hurling Championship: 1964, 1966 (c), 1967, 1969
- National Hurling League: 1965–66 (c)
- All-Ireland Minor Hurling Championship: 1960
- Leinster Minor Hurling Championship: 1960

Sporting positions
Preceded by Paddy Moran	Kilkenny Senior Hurling Captain; 1966	Succeeded by Jim Treacy
