= Frank Holohan =

Irish hurler

Personal information
- Native name: Prionsias Ó hUallacháin (Irish)
- Born: 6 March 1957 (age 69) Knocktopher, County Kilkenny, Ireland
- Occupation: Army officer
- Height: 6 ft 0 in (183 cm)

Sport
- Sport: Hurling
- Position: Right corner-back
Club
- Years: Club
- Ballyhale Shamrocks
Club titles
- Kilkenny titles: 9
- Leinster titles: 4
- All-Ireland Titles: 3
Inter-county
Years	County	Apps (scores)
1981-1987	Kilkenny	4 (0-00)
Inter-county titles
- Leinster titles: 3
- All-Irelands: 1
- NHL: 2
- All Stars: 0

Frank Holohan (born 6 March 1957) is an Irish retired hurler who played as a left corner-back for the Kilkenny senior team.

Holohan joined the team during the 1981-82 National League and was a regular member of the team until his retirement from inter-county hurling after six seasons. During that time he won three Leinster winners' medal and two National Hurling League winners' medal. He also won one All-Ireland winners' medal as a non-playing substitute.

At club level Holohan is a three-time All-Ireland medalist with Ballyhale Shamrocks. In addition to this he has also won four Leinster winners' medals and nine county club championship winners' medals.

Honours

Sporting positions
Preceded by Kieran Carey	Kilkenny Senior Hurling Captain; 1986	Succeeded by Paddy Prendergast
