= Ger Henderson =

Irish hurler

Personal information
- Native name: Gearóid Mac Éinrí (Irish)
- Born: 5 May 1954 (age 72) Johnstown, County Kilkenny Ireland
- Occupation: Farmer
- Height: 6 ft 0 in (183 cm)

Sport
- Sport: Hurling
- Position: Centre-back
Club
- Years: Club
- Fenians
Club titles
- Kilkenny titles: 3
- Leinster titles: 1
- All-Ireland Titles: 0
Inter-county*
Years	County	Apps (scores)
1974–1988	Kilkenny	39 (0-00)
Inter-county titles
- Leinster titles: 8
- All-Irelands: 5
- NHL: 4
- All Stars: 5
- *Inter County team apps and scores correct as of 18:05, 20 June 2015.

Ger Henderson (born 5 May 1954) is a former Irish sportsperson. He played hurling with the Kilkenny senior inter-county team in the 1970s and 1980s.

== Early life ==
Ger Henderson was born in Johnstown, County Kilkenny in 1954. He was educated locally at Johnstown national school where his interest in hurling first began. Later, Henderson and his two brothers, Pat and John, would form the backbone of the Kilkenny team of the 1970s and early 1980s.

== Playing career ==
=== Club ===
Henderson played his club hurling with the local Fenians club in Johnstown. He was too young to play senior hurling when the club triumphed winning county championship titles in the early 1970s, however, he did win county title and a Leinster club title in 1974.

=== Inter-county ===
By 1972, Henderson was a member of the Kilkenny minor hurling team that won the All-Ireland title. He later joined the county's under-21 side, winning back-to-back All-Ireland titles in 1974 and 1975. By this stage, Henderson was also a member of the Kilkenny senior hurling panel. In 1976, he tasted his first senior hurling success when he won a National Hurling League medal. Two years later, in 1978, Henderson had taken over from his brother Pat as centre-back on the team, and he won his first Leinster title that year. Kilkenny were later defeated by Cork in the All-Ireland final. In spite of this, Henderson's championship performance earned him his first All-Star award.

In 1979, Henderson captured a second Leinster title before later collecting his first All-Ireland following a win over Galway. Once again he was presented with an All-Star award, as well as claiming the Texaco Hurler of the Year award. Three years later, Henderson won a second National League and a third Leinster medal, before winning a second All-Ireland medal following a win over Cork. Once again, his performance at centre-back earned him his third All-Star award. In 1983, Henderson captured another quartet of National League, Leinster, All-Ireland and All-Star honours.

The following few years saw Kilkenny's hurling fortunes take a downturn. In spite of this, Henderson won a fourth National League in 1986, before adding a fifth Leinster title in 1987. Kilkenny were later defeated by Galway in the All-Ireland final.

Preceded by John Horgan (Cork)	Texaco Hurler of the Year; 1979	Succeeded by Joe Connolly (Galway)
