= Mickey Kelly =

Irish hurler

Personal information
- Native name: Mícheál Ó Ceallaigh (Irish)
- Born: 24 September 1929 Thomastown, County Kilkenny, Ireland
- Died: 26 October 2011 (aged 82) St. Luke's Hospital, Kilkenny, Ireland
- Occupation: Farmer
- Height: 5 ft 9 in (175 cm)

Sport
- Sport: Hurling
- Position: Left wing-forward
Club
- Years: Club
- 1948–1963: Bennettsbridge
Club titles
- Kilkenny titles: 7
Inter-county
- Years: County
- 1952–1960: Kilkenny
Inter-county titles
- Leinster titles: 4
- All-Irelands: 1
- NHL: 0

Michael Kelly (24 September 1929 – 26 October 2011) was an Irish hurler who played as a left wing-forward for the Kilkenny senior team from 1952 until 1960.

Kelly made his first appearance for the team during the 1952 championship and became a regular player over the next decade. During that time he won one All-Ireland winner's medal and three Leinster winner's medals. He captained Kilkenny to the All-Ireland title in 1957.

At club level Kelly enjoyed a successful career with Bennettsbridge, winning seven county club championship winners' medals.

== Playing career ==
=== Club ===
Kelly played his club hurling with his local Bennettsbridge club and enjoyed much success. He helped 'the bridge' to the county junior championship in 1948 and 1951 before the club moved up to the senior grade. Kelly later added seven county senior championship titles to his collection in 1952, 1953, 1955, 1956, 1959, 1960, 1962.

=== Inter-county ===
Kelly first came to prominence on the inter-county scene with Kilkenny in 1953. That year he won his first Leinster title following a victory over Wexford. The subsequent All-Ireland semi-final pitted Kilkenny against Galway. In a close and exciting game, the men from the West secured a one-point victory by 3–5 to 1–10.

Four years later in 1957 Kelly was appointed captain of the Kilkenny senior team. That year he collected his second Leinster title following a victory over All-Ireland champions Wexford. This allowed Kelly's side to advance directly to the championship decider where Waterford provided the opposition. In a high-scoring game between these two neighbours, Waterford took a six-point lead with fifteen minutes left in the game. Then Kilkenny fought back with goals by Mick Kenny and Billy Dwyer. Kelly played a captain's role by scoring the winning point for Kilkenny. A 4–10 to 3–12 victory gave Kelly an All-Ireland medal and the honour of collecting the Liam MacCarthy Cup.

Two years later in 1959 Kelly came on as a substitute to collect his third Leinster winners' medal. The subsequent ALl-Ireland final saw Kilkenny and Waterford do battle once again. The game ended in a draw, forcing both sides to return to Croke Park four weeks later for a replay. Kelly, who played no part in the drawn game, came on as a substitute once again. On that occasion Waterford secured their second All-Ireland title.

In 1960 Kelly was appointed Kilkenny captain once again. That year, however, his side were defeated by arch-rivals Wexford in the Leinster final. Kelly retired from inter-county hurling shortly afterwards.

=== Provincial ===
Kelly also lined out with Leinster in the inter-provincial hurling competition. He first played for his province in 1953 and collected his only Railway Cup medal in 1954.

== Personal life ==
One of eleven children, Michael Kelly was born in the townland of Killarney, Thomastown, County Kilkenny. After attending the local national school he was sent, as a boarder, to St. Francis' College, run by the Capuchin Friars at Rochestown in Cork. He left at the age of sixteen and returned to live near the village of Bennettsbridge where he combined farming with a job in Mosse's flour milling company.

Kelly died on 26 October 2011 following a short battle with cancer.

Sporting positions
Preceded by Paddy Buggy	Kilkenny Senior Hurling Captain; 1957	Succeeded by Mick Kenny
Preceded by Seán Clohessy	Kilkenny Senior Hurling Captain; 1960	Succeeded by Séamus Cleere
Achievements
Preceded by Jim English	All-Ireland Senior Hurling Final winning captain 1957	Succeeded by Tony Wall
