= Denis Byrne =

Irish sportsperson (born 1974)

Personal information
- Native name: Donncha Ó Broin (Irish)
- Born: County Kilkenny

Sport
- Sport: Hurling
- Position: Forward
Club
- Years: Club
- 1991-2009: Graigue–Ballycallan
Club titles
- Kilkenny titles: 2
Inter-county
- Years: County
- 1994-2002 2003: Kilkenny; Tipperary
Inter-county titles
- Leinster titles: 4
- All-Irelands: 1
- NHL: 2
- All Stars: 1

Denis Martin Byrne (born 24 October 1974) is an Irish sportsperson who is a hurling All Star. He played with his local club Graigue–Ballycallan, in County Kilkenny, from 1991 to 2009, and with Kilkenny senior inter-county hurling team from 1994 until 2002, including a period as captain. He is currently involved in skills training with the Dublin Senior Hurling team.

He won a Minor All-Ireland medal with Kilkenny in 1991, an All-Ireland Under-21 Hurling Championship in 1994 and a National Hurling League medal in 1995. He was on the Kilkenny All-Ireland Senior winning side in 2000 and was awarded an All-Star during the same year.

== Career ==
In 1988, Byrne played with Callan CBS to win Roinn B All-Ireland Colleges Juvenile Hurling Champion, and went on to win the Roinn B All-Ireland Colleges Senior Hurling Championship of 1991 where they beat Coláiste Spiorad Naomh (Cork) 1-14 to 1-0. Byrne won an All-Ireland Minor Hurling Championship medal with Kilkenny in 1991 when they beat Tipperary 0-15 : 1-10 at Croke Park. He won an All-Ireland Under 21 Hurling Championship with Kilkenny in 1994 and was the leading scorer in the campaign.

Byrne played in the All-Ireland Under 21 Hurling Championship final in 1995. He won a National Hurling League medal for Kilkenny in 1995 when Kilkenny beat Clare 2–12:0–9. He played in the Leinster Senior Hurling Championship final of 1995, where Kilkenny were beaten by Offaly 2-16:2-5. He missed the 1996 championship due to injury. He played with Kilkenny in the All-Ireland Senior Hurling Championship of 1997 where Kilkenny were beaten by Clare 1-17 to 1-14 in the All Ireland semi- final. He was on the All-Ireland Senior Hurling Championship panel of 1998. He played with Graigue-Ballycallan in the Kilkenny Senior Hurling Championship final of 1998 where they beat The Fenians 1-14:0-12.

Byrne was captain of Kilkenny for the All-Ireland Senior Hurling Championship final of 1999 where they were runner-up to Cork 0-13 – 0-12. He played with Graigue–Ballycallan in the Kilkenny Senior Hurling Championship final of 1999 where they lost to Glenmore 1-14 : 2-08.

He played on the Kilkenny All-Ireland Senior Hurling Championship winning side of 2000, and was awarded an All-Star during the same year. He played with Graigue-Ballycallan in the Kilkenny Senior Hurling Championship final of 2000 where they beat O'Loughlin Gaels 0-16 : 0-09. He captained the Kilkenny team in the All-Ireland Senior Hurling Championship of 2001 where they won the leinster final beating Wexford. He played with Graigue–Ballycallan in the Kilkenny Senior Hurling Championship final of 2001 where they lost to O'Loughlin Gaels 1-17 : 1-06.

After falling out of Brian Cody's plans for Kilkenny in 2002, Byrne instead played for the Tipperary senior hurling team when he transferred to Mullinahone in South Tipperary in 2003. He had reached an agreement with the Tipperary management and county board that he wouldn't line out against Kilkenny in a competitive fixture for Tipperary. He won two south Tipperary Senior hurling medals in 2003 and 2004

== Honours ==
- All Stars 2000 (1)
- AIB Leinster Club Player of the Year (1)
  - 2000
- All-Ireland Senior Hurling Championship (1)
  - 2000; runner-up 1998, 1999
- Leinster Senior Hurling Championship (4)
  - 1998, 1999, 2000, 2001; runner-up 1995, 1997
- National Hurling League (2)
  - 1995, 2002
  - Leinster Club winner 2000
  - All Ireland club runners up 2001
  - Kilkenny Senior Hurling winners (2)1998 and 2000 runner-up 1999, 2001]
  - Oireachtas winner 1999
  - Ryan Cup winner Carlow IT 1993
  - All Ireland Senior colleges winner 1991
  - All Ireland Junior Colleges winner 1988
  - Under 14 Poc Fada All Ireland winner 1988
  - All Ireland under 21 winner 1994 runner up 1995
  - Leinster under 21 winner 1994 and 1995
  - All Ireland Minor winner 1991.
  - Leinster minor winner 1991 and 1992
  - All Ireland Senior Inter Firms 1994
  - Munster Senior inter firms winner 1994.
  - South Tipperary Senior Hurling (2) 2003 and 2004

== See also ==
- Graigue–Ballycallan GAA
- Kilkenny GAA
- Tipperary GAA
- List of Kilkenny senior hurling team captains
- List of All-Ireland Senior Hurling Championship medal winners
