= Mick Kenny (Kilkenny hurler) =

Irish hurler

Personal information
- Native name: Mícheál Ó Cionnaith (Irish)
- Born: 1925 Callan, County Kilkenny, Ireland
- Died: January 2003 (aged 77–78) Kilkenny, Ireland
- Occupation: Army officer
- Height: 5 ft 9 in (175 cm)

Sport
- Sport: Hurling
- Position: Centre-back
Clubs
- Years: Club
- Graigue; John Locke's
Inter-county
- Years: County
- 1957-1958: Kilkenny
Inter-county titles
- Leinster titles: 2
- All-Irelands: 1

Michael "Mick" Kenny (1925–2003) was an Irish hurler. He played club hurling for Graigue–Ballycallan and starred as a member of the Kilkenny senior inter-county team during the 1950s,Michael "Mick" Kenny (1925–2003) was an Irish hurler. He played club hurling for Graigue–Ballycallan and starred as a member of the Kilkenny senior inter-county team during the 1950s, winning an All-Ireland title and two Leinster titles.
