= Leinster Senior Hurling Championship =

Inter-county hurling competition

- Current season or competition: 2026 Leinster Senior Hurling Championship
- Irish: Craobh Iomána Laighean
- Code: Hurling
- Founded: 1888; 138 years ago
- Region: Leinster (GAA)
- Trophy: Bob O'Keeffe Cup
- No. of teams: 6
- Title holders: Galway (4th title)
- Most titles: Kilkenny (77 titles)
- Sponsors: Littlewoods Ireland, Etihad Airways, Centra
- TV partner: RTÉ
- Motto: Nothing beats being there
- Official website: Official website

The Leinster GAA Hurling Senior Championship, known simply as the Leinster Championship, is an annual inter-county hurling competition organised by the Leinster Council of the Gaelic Athletic Association (GAA). It is the highest inter-county hurling competition in the province of Leinster, and has been contested every year since the 1888 championship.

The final, usually held on the first Sunday in June, serves as the culmination of a series of games played during May and June, and the results determine which team receives the Bob O'Keeffe Cup. The championship was previously played on a straight knockout basis whereby once a team lost they were eliminated from the championship; however, as of 2018, the championship has been played on a round-robin system.

The Leinster Championship is an integral part of the wider GAA Hurling All-Ireland Senior Championship. The winners of the Leinster final, like their counterparts in the Munster Championship, are rewarded by advancing directly to the semi-final stage of the All-Ireland series of games. The losers of the Leinster final enter the All-Ireland series at the quarter-final stage, while the third-placed team advances to the preliminary quarter-finals. Each year, the lowest finishing team is relegated to the Joe McDonagh Cup.

Six teams currently participate in the Leinster Championship. Fifteen teams have competed since the inception of the Leinster Championship in 1888.

The title has been won by six different counties, all of whom have won the title more than once. The all-time record-holders are Kilkenny, who have won the championship on 77 occasions.

Galway are the title holders, defeating Dublin by 4-29 to 4-15 in the 2026 final.

TJ Reid with 14 titles, holds the record for the player winning the most Leinster titles.

== History ==
=== Development ===
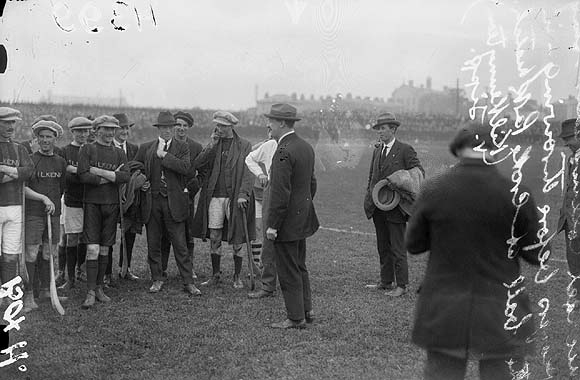
Michael Collins speaking to the Kilkenny team before the 1921 Leinster final at Croke Park

Following the foundation of the Gaelic Athletic Association in 1884, new rules for Gaelic football and hurling were drawn up and published in the United Irishman newspaper. In 1886, county committees began to be established, with several counties affiliating over the next few years. The GAA ran its inaugural All-Ireland Senior Hurling Championship in 1887. The decision to establish that first championship was influenced by several factors. Firstly, inter-club contests in 1885 and 1886 were wildly popular and began to draw huge crowds. Clubs started to travel across the country to play against each other and these matches generated intense interest as the newspapers began to speculate which teams might be considered the best in the country. Secondly, although the number of clubs was growing, many were slow to affiliate to the Association, leaving it short of money. Establishing a central championship held the prospect of enticing GAA clubs to process their affiliations, just as the establishment of the FA Cup had done much in the 1870s to promote the development of the Football Association in England. The championships were open to all affiliated clubs who would first compete in county-based competitions, to be run by local county committees. The winners of each county championship would then proceed to represent that county in the All-Ireland series. For the first and only time in its history the All-Ireland Championship used an open draw format. Six teams entered the first championship, however, this number increased to nine in 1888. Because of this, and in an effort to reduce travelling costs, the GAA decided to introduce provincial championships in Munster and Leinster.

=== Beginnings ===
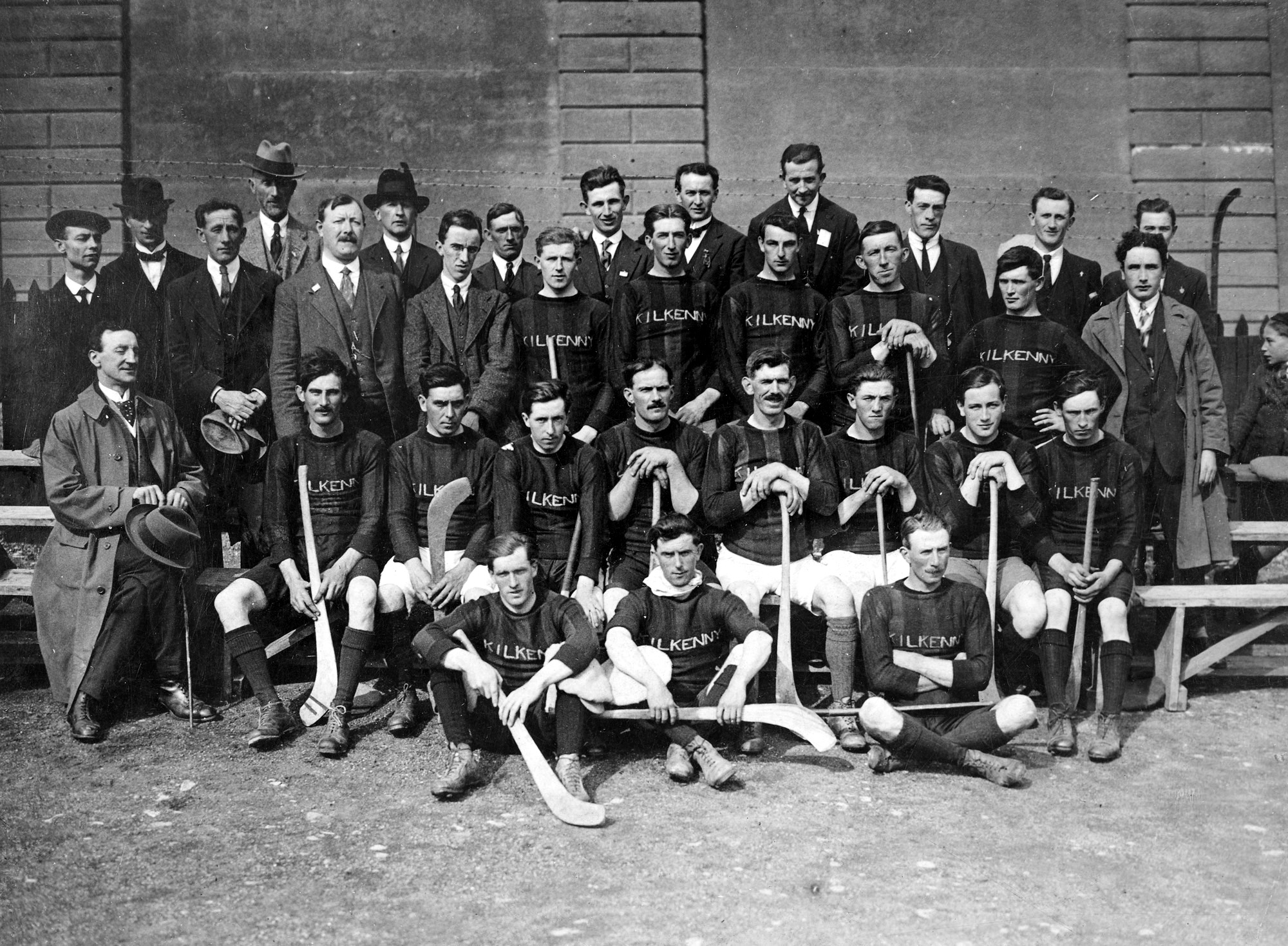
Kilkenny hurling team c. 1923

The inaugural Leinster Championship featured Dublin, Kildare, Kilkenny and Laois. Dublin and Kildare contested the very first match on Sunday 3 June 1888. Postponements, disqualifications, objections, withdrawals and walkovers were regular occurrences during the initial years of the championship. No championship took place in 1892 as Dublin were the only team to enter and were deemed the Leinster representatives in the subsequent All-Ireland series. Kilkenny rejoined the championship, however, the finals of 1893 and 1894 ended in walkovers.

=== Team dominance ===
==== Summary of champions ====
Ranking	County	Titles	Runners-up	Total
1	Kilkenny	77	31	108
2	Dublin	24	38	62
3	Wexford	21	32	53
4	Offaly	9	14	23
5	Galway	4	8	12
6	Laois	3	12	15
7	Westmeath	0	1	1

=== Format history ===
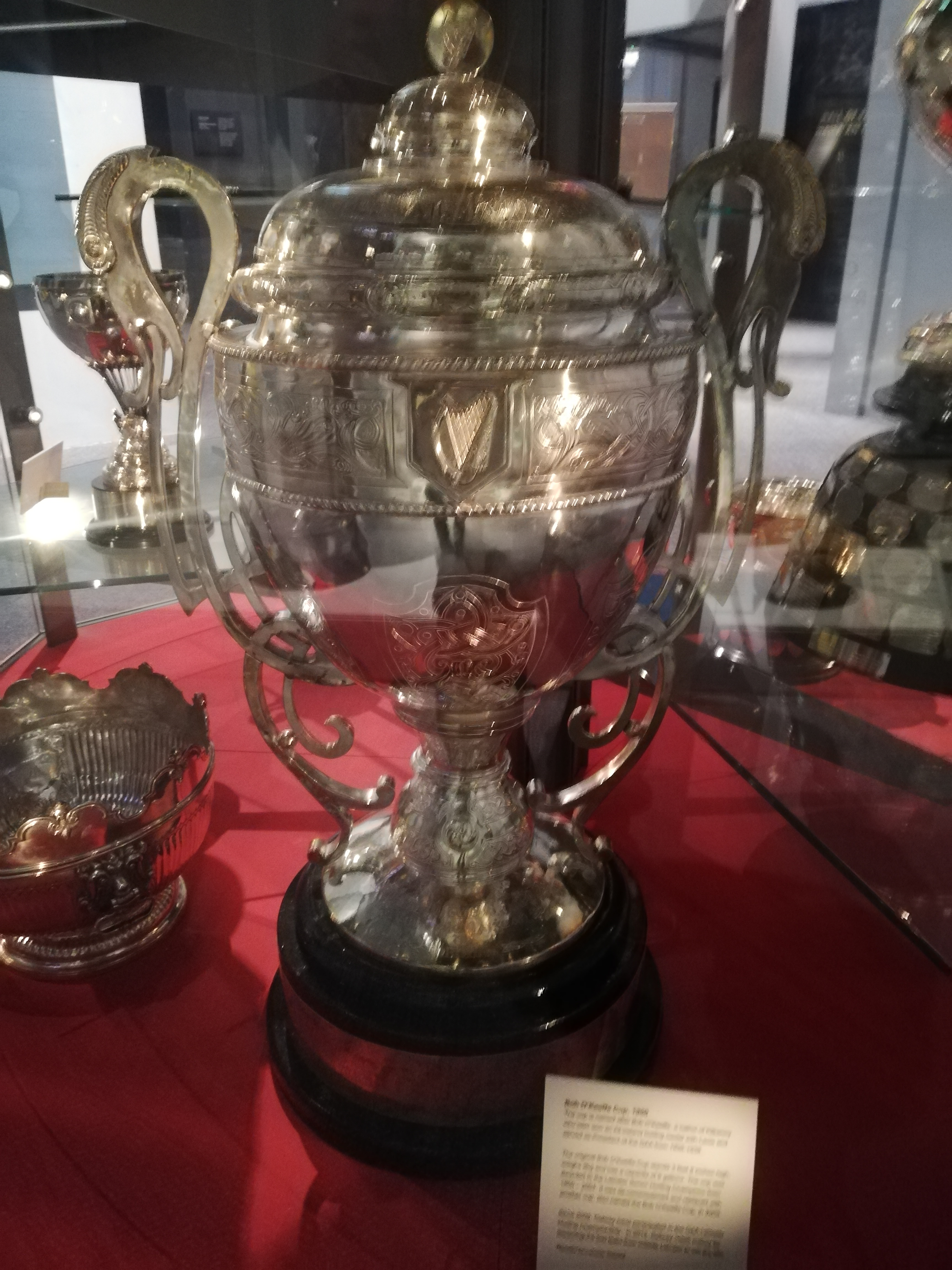
The "old" Bob O'Keeffe Cup, retired in 2005

==== Historic format ====
Between 1888 and 2017 the Leinster Championship was a knockout tournament whereby once a team was defeated they were eliminated from the championship. In the early years the pairings were drawn at random and there was no seeding. Each match was played as a single leg. If a match ended in a draw there was a replay. Drawn replays were settled with extra time; however, if both sides were still level at the end of extra time a second replay took place and so on until a winner was found. Extra-time was eventually adopted in the event of a draw for all championship games except the final.

The dominance of Kilkenny and Wexford throughout the 1960s and 1970s lead to both these teams being placed on opposite sides of the championship draw, however, this seeding system was later abolished.

==== 2000–2005 ====
The Leinster Council expanded the championship with the introduction of a group stage for the four "weakest" teams in 2000. Carlow, Dublin, Laois and Westmeath contested this group stage, with the winning team advancing to the semi-final stage of the championship proper with Kilkenny, Offaly and Wexford. This group stage system was abolished after only one year in favour of a preliminary stage knock-out championship for the "weakest" teams. Carlow, Kildare, Laois, Meath, Wicklow and Westmeath played three knock-out rounds, with the one remaining team qualifying for the quarter-final stage of the championship proper. This system remained in place, albeit with some minor adjustments, until 2005 when the "weakest" teams moved to the Christy Ring Cup and Nicky Rackard Cup.

==== 2014–2017 ====
By 2014 the number of teams participating in the Leinster Championship had risen to ten. A number of one-sided games in recent years saw the return of a group stage for the five designated "weakest" teams. Antrim, Carlow, Laois, London and Westmeath contested the group stage with each team playing each other once. The top two teams in the league advanced to the quarter-finals of the championship proper. The team placed fourth played the Christy Ring Cup winner in a promotion play-off, while the bottom-placed was relegated to the Christy Ring Cup for the following year. This format ended in 2017.

=== Qualification history ===
The Leinster Championship was an integral part of the All-Ireland Senior Hurling Championship. Between 1888 and 1996 the Leinster final winners automatically qualified for either the All-Ireland semi-final or final. The introduction of the "back door" system in 1997 allowed the defeated Leinster finalists access to the All-Ireland quarter-final, while the Leinster champions received a bye to the All-Ireland semi-final. The "back door" system was replaced in 2002 by the All-Ireland Qualifiers which afforded every defeated team in the Leinster Championship the chance of qualifying for the All-Ireland Championship. Between 2005 and 2007 both Leinster finalists qualified for the All-Ireland quarter-finals, however, this system was abolished in 2008 with the Leinster champions receiving a bye to the All-Ireland semi-final.

== Format ==
=== Development ===
In 2017, the majority delegates voted to restructure the championship once again. The new format led to the introduction of the round robin within the championship and the creation of the Joe McDonagh Cup.

=== Group stage ===
Group stage: There are six teams in the Leinster Championship. During the course of a season (from May to June) each team plays the others once (a single round-robin system) for a total of five games. Teams receive two points for a win and one point for a draw. No points are awarded for a loss. Teams are ranked by total points and then head-to-head results. The top two teams in the group contest the Leinster final with the third-placed team qualifies to the All-Ireland preliminary quarter-finals. The fourth and fifth-placed teams are eliminated from the championship and the 6th placed team is relegated to the Joe McDonagh Cup.

==== Tie-breakers ====
In the event of teams finishing on equal points, the tie shall be decided by the following means (in the order specified):

- Where two teams only are involved – the outcome of the meeting of the two teams
- Score difference – subtracting the total "Scores Against" from the total "Scores For"
- Highest Total "Score For"
- Highest Total "Goals For"
- A Play-Off

=== Knockout stage ===
Final: The top two teams in the group stage contest the final. The winning team are declared champions.

=== Promotion and relegation ===
A system of promotion and relegation exists between the Leinster Championship and the Joe McDonagh Cup. If a Connacht, Leinster or Ulster team win the Joe McDonagh Cup, the bottom team in the Leinster group are relegated to the following year's Joe McDonagh Cup and replaced in the Leinster championship by the Joe McDonagh champions.

== Qualification for subsequent competitions ==
=== Qualification for the All-Ireland Championship ===
As of the 2018 championship, qualification for the All-Ireland Championship has changed due to the abolition of the qualifiers. The Leinster champions continue to receive a bye to the All-Ireland semi-final while the defeated Leinster finalists enter the All-Ireland quarter-finals. The third-placed team in the group enter the All-Ireland Championship at the preliminary quarter-final stage where they play either the champions or runners-up of the Joe McDonagh Cup.

== Teams ==
=== 2026 Championship ===
Six counties competed in the 2026 Leinster Senior Hurling Championship:

County	Location	Stadium	Province	Position in 2025	First year in championship	In championship since	Championship Titles	Last Championship Title
Dublin	Donnycarney	Parnell Park	Leinster	3rd	1888		24	2013
Galway	Galway	Pearse Stadium	Connacht	Runners-up	2009	2009	3	2018
Kildare	Newbridge	St Conleth's Park	Leinster	McDonagh Cup Champions		2026	0	—
Kilkenny	Kilkenny	Nowlan Park	Leinster	Champions	1888	1888	77	2025
Offaly	Tullamore	Glenisk O'Connor Park	Leinster	5th	1897	2025	9	1995
Wexford	Wexford	Chadwicks Wexford Park	Leinster	4th	1890	1927	21	2019

=== Historic team changes ===
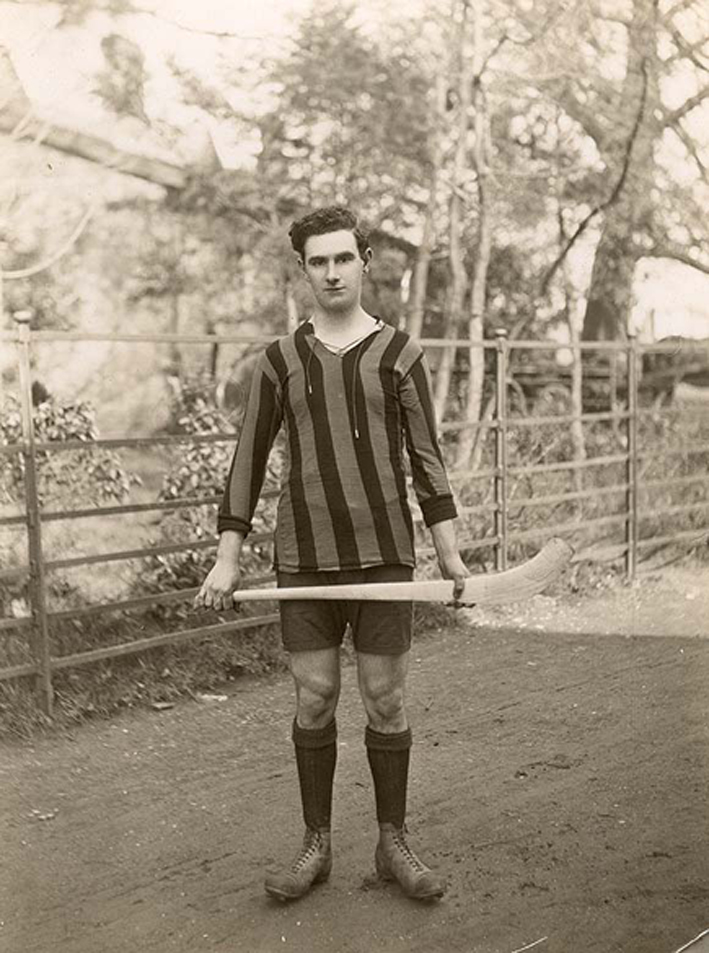
Unknown Kilkenny hurler, c. 1923

In spite of Leinster consisting of twelve counties, many of these are dominated by Gaelic football and do not compete at a serious level in hurling. Louth became the fifth team to join the championship in 1889, however, they subsequently withdrew and only contested three further championships in 1901, 1919 and 1920. Kildare also had a similar relationship with the championship. After fielding a team in the inaugural provincial campaign their involvement in later campaigns was sporadic.

Wexford, in spite of contesting the open draw All-Ireland Championship in 1887, did not field a team the inaugural Leinster Championship. They first competed in 1890 and, apart from a few absences, have remained in the championship ever since. Offaly's first involvement in the championship was in 1897.

Westmeath joined the championship in 1913 while Meath entered the championship for the first time in 1919. They were regular participants until the 1960s when they regraded. They made a brief return to the championship in the late 1990s and early 2000s.

Wicklow first fielded a team in the championship in 1943, however, their appearances in subsequent championship campaigns were sporadic.

After winning the All-Ireland Intermediate Hurling Championship in 1962, Carlow fielded a team at senior level for the first time the following year. They remained in the Leinster Championship until regrading in 1966, however, they were regular participants once again from the 1990s onward.

Longford remain the only county never to have fielded a team in the Leinster Championship.

Due to a lack of meaningful competition in their own respective provinces, Antrim and Galway pushed for entry to the Leinster Championship in the early 2000s. At a special meeting of Congress on 4 October 2008, delegates voted to include Galway and Antrim in a restructured Leinster Championship on a trial basis for three years. Dublin, Wexford and Offaly spoke against the move; however, when put to a vote approximately 80% of delegates voted in favour. Antrim remained in the championship until their relegation to the Christy Ring Cup in 2015.

In 2016 Kerry, in spite of being based in the province of Munster, joined the Leinster Championship after gaining promotion following victory in the Christy Ring Cup. They remained in the province for two championship seasons.

In 2013, an English team participated in the Leinster Championship for the first time after London gained promotion from the Christy Ring Cup. They made their debut in a 4–17 to 2–13 defeat by Carlow on 18 May 2013. The first Leinster Championship match to be played outside Ireland was London's home match at the Emerald GAA Grounds against Carlow on 27 April 2014.

== Venues ==
=== History ===
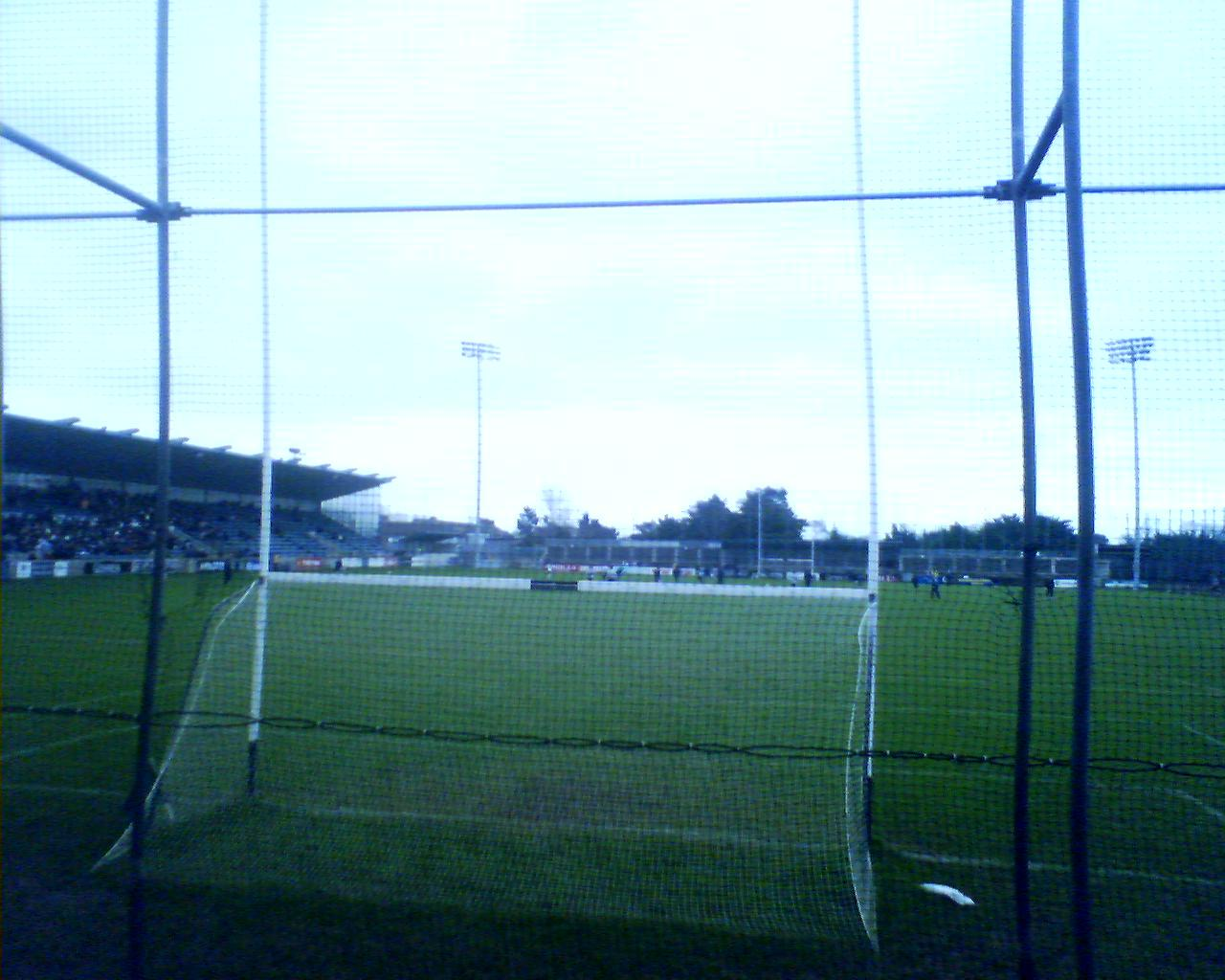
Parnell Park is the home venue of Dublin.

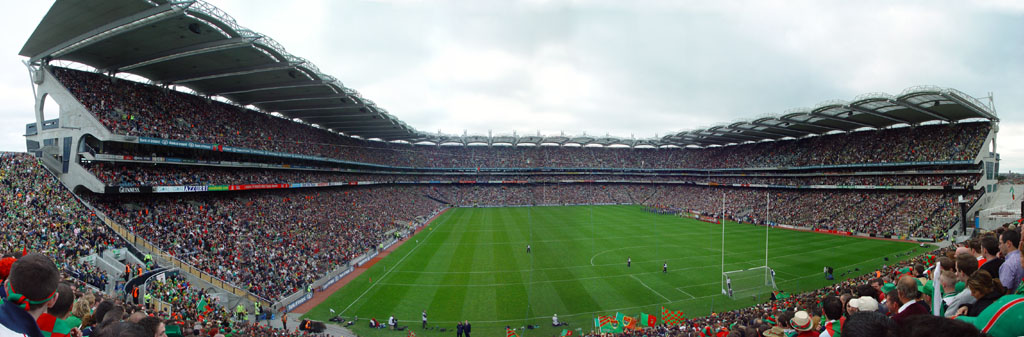
Croke Park in Dublin, as well as being the headquarters of the GAA, has hosted every Leinster final since 1962.

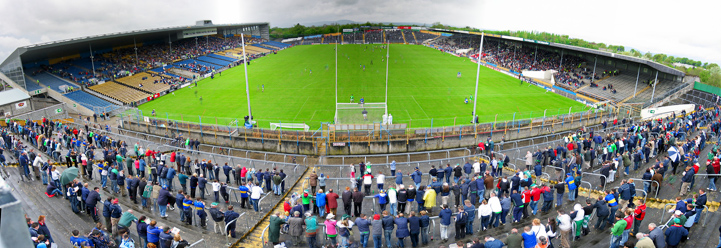
Semple Stadium, in spite of being situated outside of Leinster, hosted the final replay in 2018.

Leinster Championship matches were traditionally played at neutral venues or at a location that was deemed to be halfway between the two participants; however, teams eventually came to home and away agreements depending on the capacity of their stadiums. Every second meeting between these teams was played at the home venue of one of them.

=== Attendances ===
Stadium attendances are a significant source of regular income for the Leinster Council and for the teams involved. For the 2016 championship proper, average attendances were 11,571 with a total aggregate attendance figure of 69,429. The 2017 final between Galway and Wexford saw a record attendance of 60,032.

=== Group stage ===
Fixtures in the five group stage rounds of the championship are played at the home ground of one of the two teams. Each team is guaranteed two home games.

=== Semi-finals ===
Between 1888 and 1978 the semi-finals were played at a selection of venues around the province. A series of poorly-attended semi-finals by the 1970s lead to the decision by the Leinster Council to play both semi-finals at the same venue as part of a double-header. This occurred for the first time on 24 June 1979 when Kilkenny played Dublin and Wexford played Offaly at Geraldine Park in Athy. From 1980 until 2001 the semi-finals were played as a double-header at Croke Park, with the exception of 1993 when Dr. Cullen Park in Carlow was the venue. In 2002 the semi-finals were played outside of Leinster for the first time ever when Semple Stadium in Thurles hosted the penultimate games due to reconstruction work taking place at Croke Park. After that the semi-finals were played on different dates and at different venues around the province until their abolition after the 2017 championship.

=== Final ===
The final has been played exclusively at Croke Park since 1962. Prior to this, the final had been played at Croke Park on a number of occasions; however, smaller provincial venues were also used, most notably Nowlan Park in Kilkenny or O'Moore Park in Portlaoise. In 2018 the final was held in Semple Stadium in Thurles.

== Managers ==
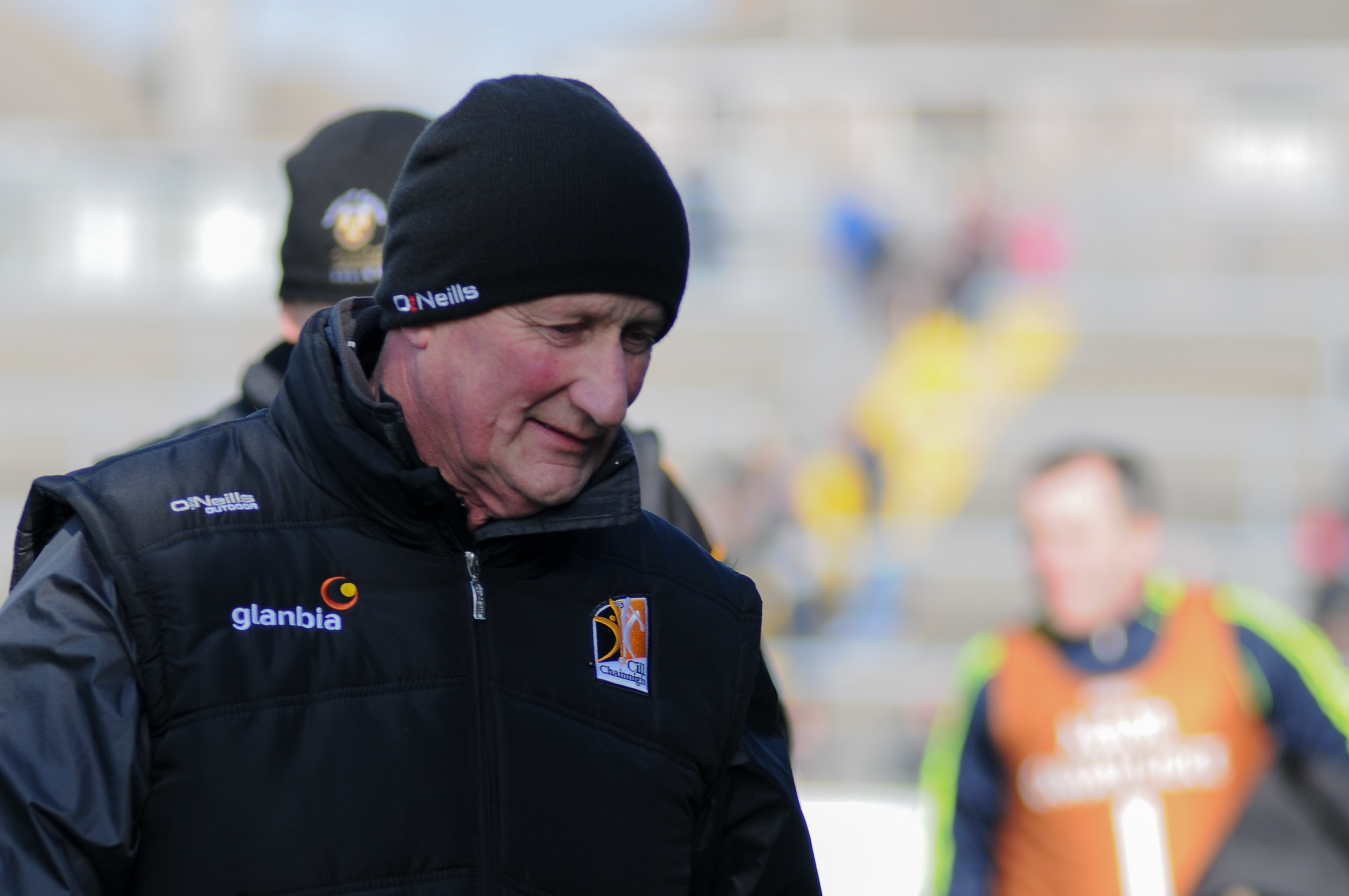
Brian Cody managed Kilkenny between 1998 and 2022

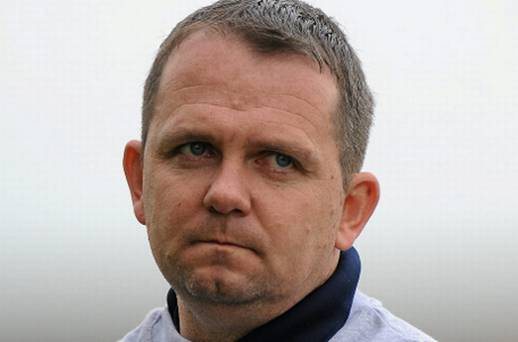
Davy Fitzgerald managed Wexford

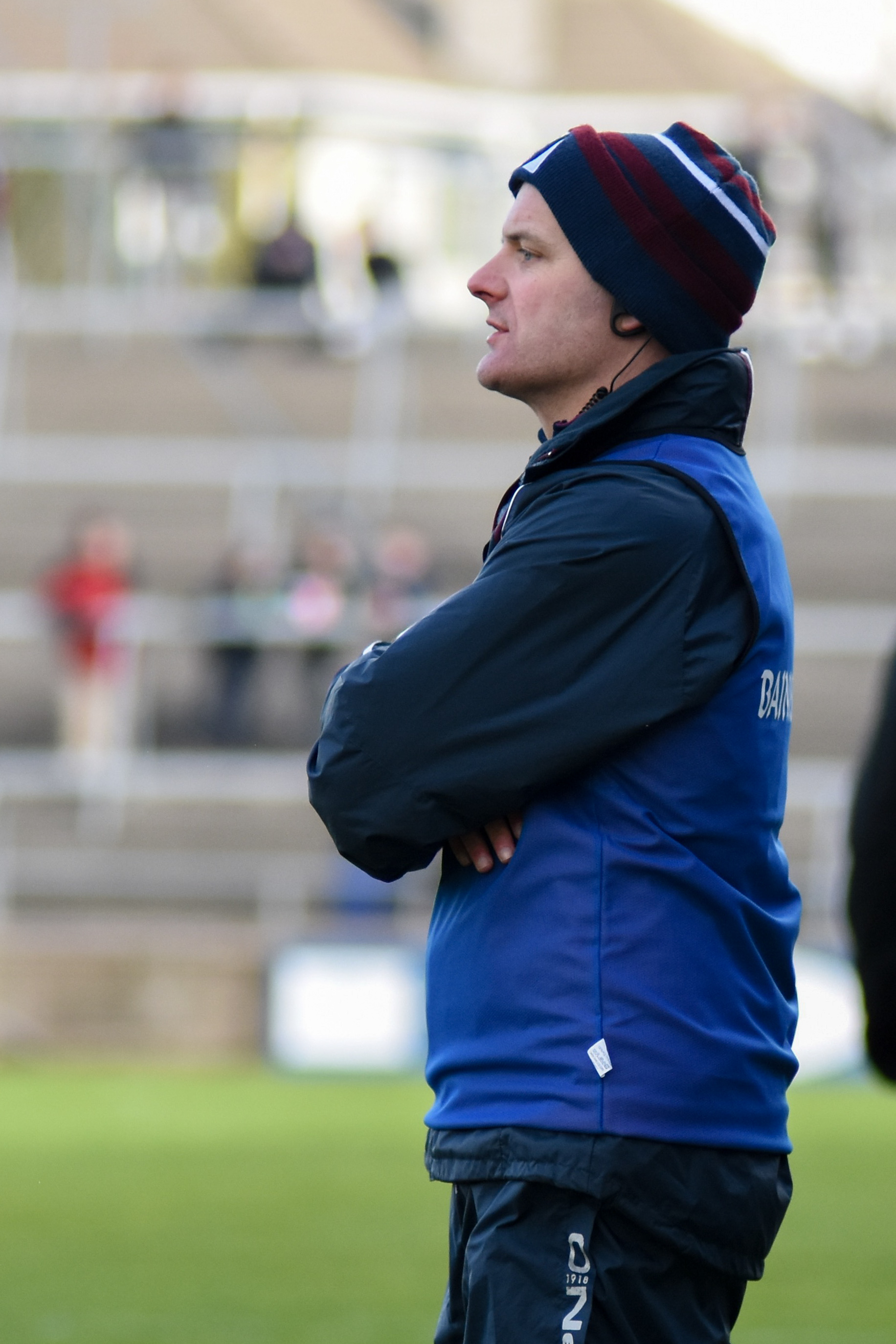
Micheál Donoghue led Galway to back-to-back Leinster titles in 2017 and 2018

Managers in the Leinster Championship are involved in the day-to-day running of the team, including the training, team selection, and sourcing of players from the club championships. Their influence varies from county-to-county and is related to the individual county boards. From 2018, all inter-county head coaches must be Award 2 qualified. The manager is assisted by a team of two or three selectors and an extensive backroom team consisting of various coaches. Prior to the development of the concept of a manager in the 1970s, teams were usually managed by a team of selectors with one member acting as chairman.

The championship's longest-serving manager was Brian Cody, who has been in charge of Kilkenny from November 1998 until 2022.

Winning managers (1979–present)
Manager	Team	Wins	Winning years
Brian Cody	Kilkenny	18	1999, 2000, 2001, 2002, 2003, 2005, 2006, 2007, 2008; 2009, 2010, 2011, 2014, 2015, 2016, 2020, 2021, 2022
Pat Henderson	Kilkenny	5	1979, 1982, 1983, 1986, 1987
Ollie Walsh	Kilkenny	3	1991, 1992, 1993
Derek Lyng	Kilkenny	3	2023, 2024, 2025
Micheál Donoghue	Galway	3	2017, 2018, 2026
Andy Gallagher	Offaly	2	1980, 1981
Dermot Healy	Offaly	2	1984, 1985
Éamonn Cregan	Offaly	2	1994, 1995
Eddie Keher	Kilkenny	1	1979
Georgie Leahy	Offaly	1	1988
Pad Joe Whelehan	Offaly	1	1989
Paudge Mulhare	Offaly	1	1990
Liam Griffin	Wexford	1	1996
Rory Kinsella	Wexford	1	1997
Kevin Fennelly	Kilkenny	1	1998
John Conran	Wexford	1	2004
Anthony Cunningham	Galway	1	2012
Anthony Daly	Dublin	1	2013
Davy Fitzgerald	Wexford	1	2019

Current managers
County	Name	Team	Appointed	Time as manager
	Henry Shefflin	Kilkenny	5 July 2026	93 days
	Micheál Donoghue	Galway	2 September 2024	2 years, 34 days
	Derek McGrath	Wexford	16 July 2026	82 days
	Niall Ó Ceallacháin	Dublin	10 September 2024	2 years, 26 days
	Tommy Fitzgerald	Laois	24 November 2024	1 year, 316 days
	Johnny Kelly	Offaly	5 September 2022	4 years, 31 days

== Trophy and medals ==
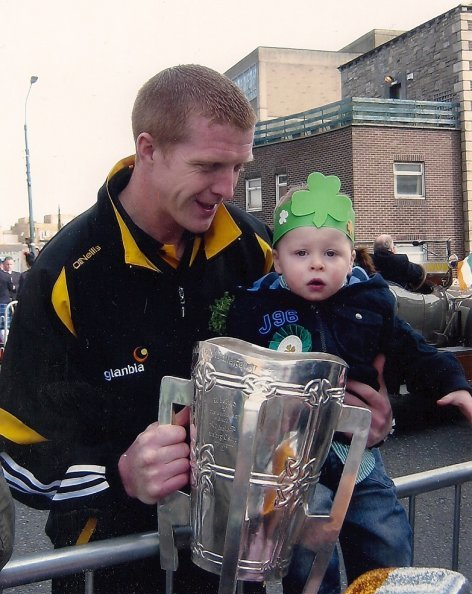
Henry Shefflin of Kilkenny won a record-equalling 13 Leinster medals between 1999 and 2014.

At the end of the Leinster final, the winning team is presented with a trophy. The Bob O'Keeffe Cup is held by the winning team until the following year's final. Traditionally, the presentation is made at a special rostrum in the stand where GAA and political dignitaries and special guests view the match.

The cup is decorated with ribbons in the colours of the winning team. During the game the cup actually has both teams' sets of ribbons attached and the runners-up ribbons are removed before the presentation. The winning captain accepts the cup on behalf of his team before giving a short speech. Individual members of the winning team then have an opportunity to come to the rostrum to lift the cup.

The cup is named after Bob O'Keeffe. He was an All-Ireland medal winner with Laois in 1915 before later serving as chairman of the Leinster Council and President of the Gaelic Athletic Association. Following his death the GAA decided to donate a trophy in his memory. The Bob O'Keeffe Memorial Cup was bought for £700 in 1949 and first presented in 1950. Standing three feet eight inches in height, weighing 564 ounces and with a capacity of 6 gallons, the cup was one of the most recognisable due to its sheer size. The Celtic chase work was taken from the Book of Kells. The hurler depicted on the top of the cup was barefooted – a reference to O'Keeffe who often played matches in his bare feet. The original Bob O'Keeffe Cup was awarded for the last time in 2004. A combination of old age and wear and tear resulted in the cup being retired to the GAA Museum in Croke Park.

In 2005 the new Bob O'Keeffe Cup was presented for the first time. The new trophy was made in 1894 in London of Victorian silver, but was idle since 1920 when it was last presented as a racing trophy. Valued at €25,000, the cup was bought in a jewellers' shop in Temple Bar.

In accordance with GAA rules, the Leinster Council awards up to twenty-six gold medals to the winners of the Leinster final. A 2012 Leinster Championship winners' medal was sold on eBay for €570.

== Sponsorship ==
Since 1995, the Leinster Championship has been sponsored. The sponsor has usually been able to determine the championship's sponsorship name.

Period	Sponsor(s)	Name
1888–1994	No main sponsor	The Leinster Championship
1995–2007	(Republic of Ireland) Guinness	The Guinness Leinster Championship
2008–2009	(Republic of Ireland) RTÉ Sport, (United Arab Emirates) Etihad Airways, (Republic of Ireland) Guinness	The Leinster GAA Hurling Championship
2010–2012	(Republic of Ireland) Centra, (United Arab Emirates) Etihad Airways, (Republic of Ireland) Guinness	The Leinster GAA Hurling Championship
2013–2016	(Republic of Ireland) Centra, (United Arab Emirates) Etihad Airways, (United States) Liberty Insurance	The Leinster GAA Hurling Championship
2017–2019	(Republic of Ireland) Centra, (Republic of Ireland) Littlewoods Ireland, (Republic of Ireland) Bord Gáis Energy	The Leinster GAA Hurling Championship

== Media coverage ==
In the early years of coverage Radio Éireann had exclusive radio coverage of championship games. When Telefís Éireann was established on 31 December 1961, the new station was interested in the broadcasting of championship games. The GAA, however, were wary that live television coverage would result in lower attendances at games. Because of this, the association restricted annual coverage of its games to the All-Ireland hurling and football finals, the two All-Ireland football semi-finals and the two Railway Cup finals.

The first live broadcast of a Leinster final took place on Network 2 on 14 July 1996.

In 2007, it was announced that TV3 had signed a three-year broadcasting deal with the GAA, resulting in senior inter-county championship games not being broadcast exclusively on RTÉ for the first time since 1962. TV3's first live championship broadcast was the final between Kilkenny and Wexford on 6 July 2008. Following the completion of the initial three-year deal in 2010, the GAA were satisfied to give TV3 an expanded role in Gaelic games broadcasting. TV3 broadcast one of the semi-finals over the next three years, however, RTÉ retained the rights to the other matches, including the final.

Since 2014, Sky Sports and RTÉ have shared live coverage of championship matches. Sky broadcast their first championship match, a quarter-final between Kilkenny and Offaly, on 7 June 2014.

== Championship upsets ==
The possibility of unlikely victories in the various rounds of the championship, where lower ranked teams beat higher placed opposition in what is known as a "giant killing", is much anticipated by the public. Such upsets are considered an integral part of the tradition and unpredictable nature of the championship, and the attention gained by giant-killing teams can be as great as that for winners of the championship. Almost every team in the championship has a giant-killing act in its history. It is considered particularly newsworthy when a top championship team suffers an upset defeat.

- Westmeath's championship run (1937): After winning the All-Ireland Junior Hurling Championship the previous year, Westmeath joined the senior championship in 1937. Defeats of Meath, Offaly and Laois in the earlier rounds saw them qualify for the Leinster final for the first and only time in their history. Westmeath looked as though they would create a major upset when they were leading reigning champions Kilkenny going into the final quarter. Two late goals gave Kilkenny a fortunate 5–3 to 2–4 victory.
- Offaly 5–10 Wexford 3–11 (29 June 1969): Offaly had been described as the David of inter-county hurling when facing reigning All-Ireland champions Wexford in the Leinster semi-final. At half-time they held a 5–4 to 0–5 lead, with Paddy Molloy scoring 3–4 of his team's total by the end.
- Offaly 3–17 Kilkenny 5–10 (13 July 1980): Undoubtedly regarded as one of the most significant days in the history of Offaly hurling. Offaly were only appearing in their sixth Leinster final ever and were looking for their first success, while Kilkenny were looking for a third consecutive provincial title. After a high-scoring first-half, Kilkenny only had a 3–6 to 1–10 lead. The game reached its climax in the final ten minutes as both sides swapped the lead several times. In the end, the Leinster final roll of honour had a new name as Offaly won the game by a point.
- Wexford 2–15 Kilkenny 1–16 (13 June 2004): Kilkenny were the red-hot favourites coming into this provincial semi-final. They were on the trail of a record-breaking seventh consecutive Leinster title and a third consecutive All-Ireland title. The game was going Kilkenny's way until the last puck of the game. Wexford had tested the champions but with time nearly up 'the Cats' still had a one-point lead. A Kilkenny clearance fell straight to Michael Jacob who made no mistake in sending the sliotar into the net. With that the referee sounded the long whistle and Kilkenny's great run was at an end.
- Galway 2–21 Kilkenny 2–11 (8 July 2012): Galway secured their first ever Leinster title with a devastating display against a Kilkenny team seeking an eighth successive title. Joe Canning scored their first goal after three minutes and held a commanding 2–12 to 0–4 half-time lead. A shell-shocked Kilkenny rallied in the second half but only managed to come within ten points of Galway by the end.
- Laois 0–29 Offaly 0–21 (7 June 2015): This was described as the most complete performance by Laois ever. After a week of turmoil which saw their manager, Séamus Plunkett, resign before resuming his post, Laois added to Offaly's hurling woes with an eight-point defeat.
- Westmeath 2–22 Offaly 1–11 (1 May 2016): Offaly and Westmeath had operated in different spheres since their last championship meeting in 1976 with many believing that Offaly would record an easy victory. Offaly trailed 1–9 to 0–7 at half-time, which was not indicative of Westmeath's dominance, but into a strong wind after the break, Westmeath fired five points in five minutes to pull out of sight.
- Wexford 1–20 Kilkenny 3–11 (10 June 2017): Wexford had earlier defeated Kilkenny in the quarter-final of the National Hurling League, however, many believed that a repeat performance six weeks later would be beyond Wexford. Their manager, Davy FitzGerald, was also banished to the stands after an incident in the league. Kilkenny had the luxury of an early goal, however, they seemed uncharacteristically nervous. Lee Chin was inspirational for Wexford in a play-making role at midfield as Wexford blew the championship wide open with a three-point victory.
- Westmeath 2-15 Wexford 0-21 (14 May 2022): Westmeath earned a memorable result in the Leinster Senior Hurling Championship, holding Wexford to a draw at TEG Cusack Park, Mullingar. A last-gasp goal from Derek McNicholas earned the Midlanders a 2-15 to 0-21 draw after an excellent performance; the veteran substitute raising a green flag in the fifth minute of stoppage time. Niall Mitchell provided the hosts’ other goal, while Killian Doyle was their top-scorer with 0-11 (nine frees, one ’65). Westmeath finished with 14 men, after Davy Glennon was shown a second yellow card with four minutes of normal time remaining. A win would have guaranteed place in the All-Ireland for Wexford in the Leinster Championship with a game to spare as they would have finished in the top 3 in Leinster but they were denied by a Westmeath side who also impressively beat Laois by 18 points on the final day of the Championship to finish 3 points above the relegation spot.
- Westmeath 4-18 Wexford 2-22 (21 May 2023): Westmeath defeated Wexford for the first time since 1940. It was second year in a row Wexford failed to defeat Westmeath.
- Wexford 4-23 Kilkenny 5-18 (14 May 2023): Wexford needed to defeat Kilkenny to avoid relegation to the 2024 Joe McDonagh Cup.
- Dublin 1-26 Kilkenny 0-22 (24 May 2026): Dublin defeated Kilkenny to qualify for the Leinster final and in doing so, eliminated 6-time defending champions Kilkenny from both the Leinster and All Ireland series — the first time Kilkenny failed to qualify for the series since the round-robin system was introduced. Offaly's win against Kildare put their side in third place and gave them an All Ireland quarter final place.

== Roll of honour ==
=== Performance by county ===
County	Titles	Runners-up	Years won	Years runner-up
Kilkenny	77	31	1888, 1893, 1895, 1897, 1898, 1900, 1903, 1904, 1905, 1907, 1909, 1911, 1912, 1913, 1916, 1922, 1923, 1925, 1926, 1931, 1932, 1933, 1935, 1936, 1937, 1939, 1940, 1943, 1945, 1946, 1947, 1950, 1953, 1957, 1958, 1959, 1963, 1964, 1966, 1967, 1969, 1971, 1972, 1973, 1974, 1975, 1978, 1979, 1982, 1983, 1986, 1987, 1991, 1992, 1993, 1998, 1999, 2000, 2001, 2002, 2003, 2005, 2006, 2007, 2008, 2009, 2010, 2011, 2014, 2015, 2016, 2020, 2021, 2022, 2023, 2024, 2025	1896, 1902, 1906, 1908, 1914, 1917, 1919, 1920, 1921, 1927, 1934, 1938, 1941, 1942, 1949, 1955, 1956, 1960, 1962, 1965, 1968, 1970, 1976, 1977, 1980, 1989, 1995, 1997, 2012, 2018, 2019
Dublin	24	38	1889, 1892, 1894, 1896, 1902, 1906, 1908, 1917, 1919, 1920, 1921, 1924, 1927, 1928, 1930, 1934, 1938, 1941, 1942, 1944, 1948, 1952, 1961, 2013	1888, 1893, 1895, 1898, 1899, 1900, 1903, 1904, 1905, 1907, 1910, 1911, 1913, 1915, 1918, 1922, 1923, 1925, 1932, 1933, 1939, 1940, 1943, 1945, 1946, 1947, 1954, 1959, 1963, 1964, 1990, 1991, 2009, 2011, 2014, 2021, 2024, 2026
Wexford	21	32	1890, 1891, 1899, 1901, 1910, 1918, 1951, 1954, 1955, 1956, 1960, 1962, 1965, 1968, 1970, 1976, 1977, 1996, 1997, 2004, 2019	1897, 1916, 1944, 1950, 1952, 1953, 1957, 1958, 1961, 1966, 1967, 1971, 1972, 1973, 1974, 1975, 1978, 1979, 1981, 1984, 1988, 1992, 1993, 1994, 2001, 2002, 2003, 2005, 2006, 2007, 2008, 2017
Offaly	9	14	1980, 1981, 1984, 1985, 1988, 1989, 1990, 1994, 1995	1901, 1924, 1926, 1928, 1969, 1982, 1983, 1986, 1987, 1996, 1998, 1999, 2000, 2004
Galway	4	8	2012, 2017, 2018, 2026	2010, 2013, 2015, 2016, 2020, 2022, 2023, 2025
Laois	3	12	1914, 1915, 1949	1889, 1890, 1891, 1909, 1912, 1930, 1931, 1935, 1936, 1948, 1951, 1985
Westmeath	0	1	—	1937

=== Performance by province ===
Province	Titles	Runners-up	Total
Leinster	134	128	262
Connacht	4	8	12

== General statistics ==
=== Results by county ===
Legend

- 1st – Champions
- 2nd – Runners-up
- 3rd/4th/5th/SF/QF – Group Stage/Quarter-Finals/Semi-Finals
- 5th/6th/QF – Relegated
- JM – Joe McDonagh Cup
- CR – Christy Ring Cup

For each year, the number of teams in each championship (in brackets) are shown.

County	2014 (10)	2015 (9)	2016 (9)	2017 (9)	2018 (5)	2019 (5)	2020 (5)	2021 (6)	2022 (6)	2023 (6)	2024 (6)	Years
Antrim	QF	GS	CR	CR	JM	JM	JM	QF	JM	5th	5th	5
Carlow	GS	GS	GS	CR	JM	5th	JM	JM	JM	JM	6th	5
Dublin	2nd	QF	SF	QF	4th	3rd	SF	2nd	4th	3rd	2nd	11
Galway	SF	2nd	2nd	1st	1st	4th	2nd	SF	2nd	2nd	4th	11
Kerry	CR	CR	GS	GS	JM	JM	JM	JM	JM	JM	JM	2
Kilkenny	1st	1st	1st	SF	2nd	2nd	1st	1st	1st	1st	1st	11
Laois	QF	SF	QF	QF	JM	JM	QF	QF	6th	JM	JM	7
London	GS	CR	CR	CR	CR	CR	CR	-	CR	CR	CR	1
Meath	CR	CR	CR	GS	JM	CR	JM	JM	JM	CR	TBD	1
Offaly	QF	QF	SF	SF	5th	JM	CR	CR	JM	JM	JM	5
Westmeath	GS	QF	QF	QF	JM	JM	JM	JM	5th	6th	JM	6
Wexford	SF	SF	QF	2nd	3rd	1st	SF	SF	3rd	4th	3rd	11

=== Seasons in Leinster SHC ===
The number of years that each county has played in the Leinster SHC between 1888 and 2026. A total of 16 counties have competed in at least one season of the Leinster SHC. Dublin have participated in the most championships. The counties in bold participate in the 2026 Leinster Senior Hurling Championship.

Years	Counties
133	**Dublin**
130	**Kilkenny**
126	**Wexford**
18	**Galway**
11	Antrim
4	Louth
2	Kerry, London, Longford
?	Carlow
?	Westmeath
?	**Offaly**
?	Laois
?	Meath
?	**Kildare**
?	Wicklow

=== Debut of counties ===
Year	Debutants	Total
1888	Dublin, Kildare, Kilkenny, Laois	4
1889	Louth	1
1890	Wexford	1
1891-96	None	0
1897	Offaly	1
1898-1901	None	0
1902	Longford	1
1903-1912	None	0
1913	Westmeath	1
1914-18	None	0
1919	Meath	1
1920-42	None	0
1943	Wicklow	1
1944-62	None	0
1963	Carlow	1
1964-2008	None	0
2009	Antrim, Galway	2
2010-12	None	0
2013	London	1
2014-15	None	0
2016	Kerry	1
2017-	None	0
**Total**		**16**

=== List of Leinster Senior Hurling Championship counties ===
The following teams have competed in the Leinster Championship for at least one season.

Team	Total years	Debut	Most recent	Championship titles	Last Championship title	Best Leinster result
Antrim	10	2009	2024	0	—	5th
Carlow		1963	2024	0	—	Semi-finals
Dublin	131	1888	2024	24	2013	**Champions**
Galway	16	2009	2024	3	2018	**Champions**
Kerry	2	2016	2017	0	—	Group stage
Kildare		1888	2004	0	—	Semi-finals
Kilkenny	128	1888	2024	75	2023	**Champions**
Laois		1888	2022	3	1949	**Champions**
London	2	2013	2014	0	—	First round
Longford	2	1902	1903	0	—	
Louth	4	1889	1920	0	—	Quarter-finals
Meath		1919	2017	0	—	Semi-finals
Offaly		1897	2018	9	1995	**Champions**
Westmeath		1913	2023	0	—	Runners-up
Wexford	124	1890	2024	21	2019	**Champions**
Wicklow		1943	2004	0	—	Quarter-finals

=== All-time table (since introduction of round robin) ===
Legend

Colours
Currently competing in the Leinster Senior Hurling Championship
Currently competing in the Joe McDonagh Cup

As of 13 April 2026. (after 2025 championship). Includes final replays.

#	Team	Pld	W	D	L	Points
1	Kilkenny	39	26	5	8	57
2	Galway	36	21	6	9	48
3	Dublin	34	17	4	13	38
4	Wexford	32	14	6	12	34
5	Antrim	16	3	1	12	7
6	Westmeath	10	2	1	7	5
7	Offaly	9	1	0	8	2
8	Carlow	9	0	1	8	1
9	Laois	7	0	0	7	0
10	Kildare	0	0	0	0	0

== List of Finals ==
=== Legend ===
- Gold – All-Ireland champions
- Silver – All-Ireland runners-up

=== List of Leinster finals ===
Year	Date	Winners		Runners-up		Venue	Winning Captain	Winning margin	Referee
Year	Date	County	Score	County	Score	Venue	Winning Captain	Winning margin	Referee
2026	6 June	Galway	4-29	Dublin	4-15	Croke Park	Darren Morrissey	14	Michael Kennedy (Tipperary)
2025	8 June	Kilkenny	3-22	Galway	1-20	Croke Park	John Donnelly	8	Johnny Murphy (Limerick)
2024	8 June	Kilkenny	3-28	Dublin	1-18	Croke Park	Paddy Deegan	16	T. Walsh (Waterford)
2023	11 June	Kilkenny	4-21	Galway	2-26	Croke Park	Eoin Cody	2	
2022	4 June	Kilkenny	0–22	Galway	0–17	Croke Park	Richie Reid	5	
2021	17 July	Kilkenny	1–25	Dublin	0–19	Croke Park	Adrian Mullen	9	Johnny Murphy (Limerick)
2020	14 November	Kilkenny	2–20	Galway	0–24	Croke Park	Colin Fennelly	4	Fergal Horgan (Tipperary)
2019		Wexford	1–23	Kilkenny	0–23	Croke Park	Lee Chin	3	
2018		Galway	0–18; 1–28	Kilkenny	0–18; 3–15	Croke Park; Semple Stadium	David Burke	0 7	
2017		Galway	0–29	Wexford	1–17	Croke Park	David Burke	9	
2016		Kilkenny	1–25	Galway	0–22	Croke Park	Lester Ryan	6	
2015		Kilkenny	1–25	Galway	2–15	Croke Park	Joey Holden	7	
2014		Kilkenny	0–24	Dublin	1–09	Croke Park	Lester Ryan	12	
2013		Dublin	2–25	Galway	2–13	Croke Park	John McCaffrey	12	
2012		Galway	2–21	Kilkenny	2–11	Croke Park	Fergal Moore	10	
2011		Kilkenny	4–17	Dublin	1–15	Croke Park	Brian Hogan	11	
2010		Kilkenny	1–19	Galway	1–12	Croke Park	T. J. Reid	7	
2009		Kilkenny	2–18	Dublin	0–18	Croke Park	Michael Fennelly	6	
2008		Kilkenny	5–21	Wexford	0–17	Croke Park	James "Cha" Fitzpatrick	19	
2007		Kilkenny	2–24	Wexford	1–12	Croke Park	Henry Shefflin	15	
2006		Kilkenny	1–23	Wexford	1–12	Croke Park	Jackie Tyrrell	11	
2005		Kilkenny	0–22	Wexford	1–16	Croke Park	Peter Barry	3	
2004		Wexford	2–12	Offaly	1–11	Croke Park	John O'Connor	4	
2003		Kilkenny	2–23	Wexford	2–12	Croke Park	D.J. Carey	11	
2002		Kilkenny	0–19	Wexford	0–17	Croke Park	Andy Comerford	2	
2001		Kilkenny	2–19	Wexford	0–12	Croke Park	Denis Byrne	13	
2000		Kilkenny	2–21	Offaly	1–13	Croke Park	Willie O'Connor	11	
1999		Kilkenny	5–14	Offaly	1–16	Croke Park	Denis Byrne	10	
1998		Kilkenny	3–10	Offaly	1–11	Croke Park	Tom Hickey	5	
1997		Wexford	2–14	Kilkenny	1–11	Croke Park	Rod Guiney	6	
1996		Wexford	2–23	Offaly	2–15	Croke Park	Martin Storey	8	
1995		Offaly	2–16	Kilkenny	2–05	Croke Park	Johnny Pilkington	11	
1994		Offaly	1–18	Wexford	0–14	Croke Park	Martin Hanamy	7	
1993 (R)		Kilkenny	2–14; 2–12	Wexford	1–17; 0–11	Croke Park	Eddie O'Connor		
1992		Kilkenny	3–16	Wexford	2–09	Croke Park	Liam Fennelly		
1991		Kilkenny	1–13	Dublin	1–11	Croke Park	Christy Heffernan		
1990		Offaly	1–19	Dublin	2–11	Croke Park	Jim Troy		
1989		Offaly	3–15	Kilkenny	4–09	Croke Park	Mark Corrigan		
1988		Offaly	3–12	Wexford	1–14	Croke Park	Aidan Fogarty		
1987		Kilkenny	2–14	Offaly	0–17	Croke Park	Paddy Prendergast		
1986		Kilkenny	4–10	Offaly	1–11	Croke Park	Frank Holohan		
1985		Offaly	5–15	Laois	0–17	Croke Park	Pat Fleury		
1984		Offaly	1–15	Wexford	2–11	Croke Park	Pat Fleury		
1983		Kilkenny	1–17	Offaly	0–13	Croke Park	Liam Fennelly		
1982		Kilkenny	1–11	Offaly	0–12	Croke Park	Brian Cody		
1981		Offaly	3–12	Wexford	2–13	Croke Park	Pádraig Horan		
1980		Offaly	3–17	Kilkenny	5–10	Croke Park	Pádraig Horan		
1979		Kilkenny	2–21	Wexford	2–17	Croke Park	Ger Fennelly		
1978		Kilkenny	2–16	Wexford	1–16	Croke Park	Ger Henderson		
1977		Wexford	3–17	Kilkenny	3–14	Croke Park	Tony Doran		
1976		Wexford	2–20	Kilkenny	1–06	Croke Park	Tony Doran		
1975^{[J]}		Kilkenny	2–20	Wexford	2–14	Croke Park	Billy Fitzpatrick		
1974		Kilkenny	6–13	Wexford	2–24	Croke Park	Nicky Orr		
1973		Kilkenny	4–22	Wexford	3–15	Croke Park	Pat Delaney		
1972 (R)		Kilkenny	6–13; 3–16	Wexford	6–13; 1–14	Croke Park	Noel Skehan		
1971		Kilkenny	6–16	Wexford	3–16	Croke Park	Pat Henderson		
1970^{[I]}		Wexford	4–16	Kilkenny	3–14	Croke Park	Michael Collins		
1969		Kilkenny	3–09	Offaly	0–16	Croke Park	Eddie Keher		
1968		Wexford	3–13	Kilkenny	4–09	Croke Park	Dan Quigley		
1967		Kilkenny	4–10	Wexford	1–12	Croke Park	Jim Treacy		
1966		Kilkenny	1–15	Wexford	2–06	Croke Park	Jim Lynch		
1965		Wexford	2–11	Kilkenny	3–07	Croke Park	Tom Neville		
1964		Kilkenny	4–11	Dublin	1–08	Croke Park	Seán Buckley		
1963		Kilkenny	2–10	Dublin	0–09	Croke Park	Séamus Cleere		
1962		Wexford	3–09	Kilkenny	2–10	Croke Park	Billy Rackard		
1961		Dublin	7–05	Wexford	4–08	Nowlan Park	Noel Drumgoole		
1960		Wexford	3–10	Kilkenny	2–11	Croke Park	Nick O'Donnell		
1959		Kilkenny	2–09	Dublin	1–11	Croke Park	Seán Clohessy		
1958		Kilkenny	5–12	Wexford	4–09	Croke Park	Mick Kenny		
1957		Kilkenny	6–09	Wexford	1–05	Croke Park	Mickey Kelly		
1956		Wexford	4–08	Kilkenny	3–10	Croke Park	Jim English		
1955 (R)		Wexford	2–07; 5–06	Kilkenny	2–07; 3–09	Croke Park	Nick O'Donnell		
1954		Wexford	8–05	Dublin	1–04	Nowlan Park	Padge Kehoe		
1953		Kilkenny	1–13	Wexford	3–05	Croke Park	Padge Kehoe		
1952		Dublin	7–02	Wexford	3–06	Nowlan Park	Jim Prior		
1951		Wexford	3–12	Laois	4–03	Croke Park	Nicky Rackard		
1950		Kilkenny	3–11	Wexford	2–11	Nowlan Park	John Keane		
1949		Laois	3–08	Kilkenny	3–06	Nowlan Park	Paddy Ruschitzko		
1948		Dublin	5–09	Laois	3–03	O'Connor Park	Frank Cummins		
1947		Kilkenny	7–10	Dublin	3–06	O'Moore Park	Dan Kennedy		
1946		Kilkenny	3–08	Dublin	1–12	Croke Park	Jack Mulcahy		
1945		Kilkenny	5–12	Dublin	3–04	Croke Park	Peter Blanchfield		
1944		Dublin	4–07	Wexford	3–03	Nowlan Park	Mick Butler		
1943		Kilkenny	3–09	Dublin	2–06	Nowlan Park	Jimmy Walsh		
1942		Dublin	4–08	Kilkenny	1–04	Nowlan Park	Frank White		
1941		Dublin	2–08	Kilkenny	1–08	Croke Park	Ned Wade		
1940		Kilkenny	3–06	Dublin	2–05	Nowlan Park	Jim Langton		
1939		Kilkenny	2–12	Dublin	4–03	O'Moore Park	Jimmy Walsh		
1938 (R)		Dublin	2–03; 4–09	Kilkenny	2–03; 2–05	O'Moore Park; O'Connor Park	Mick Daniels		
1937		Kilkenny	5–03	Westmeath	2–04	O'Moore Park	Larry Duggan		
1936		Kilkenny	4–06	Laois	2–05	Nowlan Park	Paddy Larkin		
1935		Kilkenny	3–08	Laois	0–06	O'Moore Park	Lory Meagher		
1934 (R)		Dublin	2–08; 3–05	Kilkenny	4–02; 2–02	O'Moore Park	Steve Hegarty		
1933		Kilkenny	7–05	Dublin	5–05	Wexford Park	Eddie Doyle		
1932		Kilkenny	4–06	Dublin	3–05	O'Moore Park	Jimmy Walsh		
1931		Kilkenny	4–07	Laois	4–02	Nowlan Park	Lory Meagher		
1930		Dublin	4–07	Laois	2–02	Nowlan Park	Jim Walsh		
1929^{[H]}		Kilkenny	3–05	Dublin	2–06	O'Kennedy Park	Wattie Dunphy		
1928		Dublin	9–07	Offaly	4–03	Croke Park	Mick Gill		
1927		Dublin	7–07	Kilkenny	4–06	Croke Park	Mick Gill		
1926		Kilkenny	3–08	Offaly	1–04	Croke Park	Dick Grace		
1925^{[G]}		Kilkenny	4–07	Dublin	6–04	Croke Park	Dick Grace		
1924		Dublin	4–04	Offaly	3–01	Croke Park	Frank Wall		
1923		Kilkenny	4–01	Dublin	1–01	Croke Park	Wattie Dunphy		
1922		Kilkenny	3–04	Dublin	1–02	Croke Park	Wattie Dunphy		
1921		Dublin	4–04	Kilkenny	1–05	Croke Park	Bob Mockler		
1920		Dublin	4–05	Kilkenny	2–02	Croke Park	Bob Mockler		
1919		Dublin	1–05	Kilkenny	1–02	Wexford Park	Charlie Stuart		
1918		Wexford	2–03	Dublin	1–02	Enniscorthy	Mick Cummins		
1917		Dublin	5–01	Kilkenny	4–00	Croke Park	John Ryan		
1916		Kilkenny	11–03	Wexford	2–02	Croke Park	Sim Walton		
1915		Laois	3–02	Dublin	0–05	Kilkenny Sportsfield	Jack Finlay		
1914		Laois	3–02	Kilkenny	2–04	Kilkenny Sportsfield	Jack Carroll		
1913 (R)		Kilkenny	0–03; 7–05	Dublin	1–00; 2–01	Wexford Park	Dick 'Drug' Walsh		
1912		Kilkenny	6–06	Laois	2–04	Portlaoise Sportsfield	Sim Walton		
1911		Kilkenny	4–06	Dublin	3–01	Portlaoise Sportsfield	Sim Walton		
1910		Wexford	3–03	Dublin	1–01	Geraldine Park	Dick Doyle		
1909		Kilkenny	5–16 (31)	Laois	2–07 (13)	Kilkenny Sportsfield	Dick 'Drug' Walsh		
1908		Dublin	w/o	Kilkenny	scr	(Jones' Road)			
1907		Kilkenny	4–14	Dublin	1–09	Geraldine Park	Dick 'Drug' Walsh		
1906		Dublin	1–14	Kilkenny	0–05	Wexford Park	Tom Hayes		
1905		Kilkenny	2–08	Dublin	2–02	Wexford Park	D.J. Stapleton		
1904		Kilkenny	2–08	Dublin	2–06	Enniscorthy	Jer Doheny		
1903^{[F]}		Kilkenny	1–05	Dublin	1–05	Kilkenny Sportsfield	Jer Doheny		
1902		Dublin	0–08	Kilkenny	1–04	Jones' Road	Danny McCormack		
1901		Wexford	7–06	Offaly	1–03	Kilkenny Sportsfield	Jim Furlong		
1900		Kilkenny	4–11	Dublin	4–10	Wexford Park	Dick 'Manager' Walsh		
1899		Wexford	2–12	Kilkenny	1–04	Jones' Road	Jim Furlong		
1898		Kilkenny	4–12	Dublin	3–02	Jones' Road	Ned Hennessy		
1897		Kilkenny	w/o	Wexford	scr	(Jones' Road)	Jackie Walsh		
1896 (R)^{[E]}		Dublin	1–08; 4–06	Kilkenny	0–06; 0–00	Jones' Road	Paddy Buckley		
1895		Kilkenny	1–05	Dublin	0–05	Clonturk Park	James Grace		
1894^{[D]}		Dublin					John McCabe		
1893		Kilkenny	w/o	Dublin	scr		Dick Whelan		
1892^{[C]}		Dublin					Paddy Egan		
1891		Wexford	w/o	Laois	scr	Clonturk Park	Nick Daly		
1890		Wexford	2–09	Laois	0–03	Clonturk Park	Nick Daly		
1889^{[B]}		Dublin	w/o	Laois	scr	Inchicore	Nicholas O'Shea		
1888^{[A]}		Kilkenny	0–07	Dublin	0–03	Portlaoise	John Quinn		

=== Notes ===
A. A goal outweighed any number of points until 1892. Points were only taken into consideration when the teams finished level on goals.
B. Dublin received a walkover from Laois in the final. Louth were the only other team to participate.
C. Goals were revalued to five points each. Dublin were unopposed in the championship.
D. Dublin were unopposed in the championship.
E. Goals were revalued to three points each. The final was replayed after Kilkenny launched an objection following the original match.
F. Kilkenny were awarded the title as the Dublin goal was disputed.
G. Dublin won the final; however, Kilkenny were awarded the title after launching an objection.
H. The final was declared void after both teams were disqualified for being late on the field.
I. All inter-county games were increased from sixty to eighty minutes.
J. All inter-county games were reduced from eighty to seventy minutes.

== See also ==
- Leinster Senior Hurling Championship records and statistics
- All-Ireland Senior Hurling Championship
  - Connacht Senior Hurling Championship
  - Munster Senior Hurling Championship
  - Ulster Senior Hurling Championship

== Sources ==
- "Leinster G.A.A. Hurling Roll of Honour". www.leinstergaa.ie. Archived from the original on 26 March 2016.
