= Leinster Senior Hurling Championship records and statistics =

This page details statistics of the Leinster Senior Hurling Championship.

== General performances ==
=== Performance by county ===
County	Titles	Runners-up	Years won	Years runner-up
Kilkenny	75	31	1888, 1893, 1895, 1897, 1898, 1900, 1903, 1904, 1905, 1907, 1909, 1911, 1912, 1913, 1916, 1922, 1923, 1925, 1926, 1931, 1932, 1933, 1935, 1936, 1937, 1939, 1940, 1943, 1945, 1946, 1947, 1950, 1953, 1957, 1958, 1959, 1963, 1964, 1966, 1967, 1969, 1971, 1972, 1973, 1974, 1975, 1978, 1979, 1982, 1983, 1986, 1987, 1991, 1992, 1993, 1998, 1999, 2000, 2001, 2002, 2003, 2005, 2006, 2007, 2008, 2009, 2010, 2011, 2014, 2015, 2016, 2020, 2021, 2022, 2023	1896, 1902, 1906, 1908, 1914, 1917, 1919, 1920, 1921, 1927, 1934, 1938, 1941, 1942, 1949, 1955, 1956, 1960, 1962, 1965, 1968, 1970, 1976, 1977, 1980, 1989, 1995, 1997, 2012, 2018, 2019
Dublin	24	36	1889, 1892, 1894, 1896, 1902, 1906, 1908, 1917, 1919, 1920, 1921, 1924, 1927, 1928, 1930, 1934, 1938, 1941, 1942, 1944, 1948, 1952, 1961, 2013	1888, 1893, 1895, 1898, 1899, 1900, 1903, 1904, 1905, 1907, 1910, 1911, 1913, 1915, 1918, 1922, 1923, 1925, 1932, 1933, 1939, 1940, 1943, 1945, 1946, 1947, 1954, 1959, 1963, 1964, 1990, 1991, 2009, 2011, 2014, 2021
Wexford	21	32	1890, 1891, 1899, 1901, 1910, 1918, 1951, 1954, 1955, 1956, 1960, 1962, 1965, 1968, 1970, 1976, 1977, 1996, 1997, 2004, 2019	1897, 1916, 1944, 1950, 1952, 1953, 1957, 1958, 1961, 1966, 1967, 1971, 1972, 1973, 1974, 1975, 1978, 1979, 1981, 1984, 1988, 1992, 1993, 1994, 2001, 2002, 2003, 2005, 2006, 2007, 2008, 2017
Offaly	9	14	1980, 1981, 1984, 1985, 1988, 1989, 1990, 1994, 1995	1901, 1924, 1926, 1928, 1969, 1982, 1983, 1986, 1987, 1996, 1998, 1999, 2000, 2004
Laois	3	12	1914, 1915, 1949	1889, 1890, 1891, 1909, 1912, 1930, 1931, 1935, 1936, 1948, 1951, 1985
Galway	3	7	2012, 2017, 2018	2010, 2013, 2015, 2016, 2020, 2022, 2023
Westmeath	0	1	—	1937

=== Performance by province ===
Province	Won	Lost	Total	Different teams
Leinster	132	126	258	6
Connacht	3	7	10	1

== Counties ==
=== Team results ===
Legend

- 1st – Champions
- 2nd – Runners-up
- 3rd/4th/5th/SF/QF – Group Stage/Quarter-Finals/Semi-Finals
- 5th/6th/QF – Relegated
- JM – Joe McDonagh Cup
- CR – Christy Ring Cup

For each year, the number of teams in each championship (in brackets) are shown.

County	2014 (10)	2015 (9)	2016 (9)	2017 (9)	2018 (5)	2019 (5)	2020 (5)	2021 (6)	2022 (6)	2023 (6)	2024 (6)	Years
Antrim	QF	GS	CR	CR	JM	JM	JM	QF	JM	5th		5
Carlow	GS	GS	GS	CR	JM	5th	JM	JM	JM	JM		5
Dublin	2nd	QF	SF	QF	4th	3rd	SF	2nd	4th	3rd		11
Galway	SF	2nd	2nd	1st	1st	4th	2nd	SF	2nd	2nd		11
Kerry	CR	CR	GS	GS	JM	JM	JM	JM	JM	JM	JM	2
Kilkenny	1st	1st	1st	SF	2nd	2nd	1st	1st	1st	1st		11
Laois	QF	SF	QF	QF	JM	JM	QF	QF	6th	JM	JM	7
London	GS	CR	CR	CR	CR	CR	CR	-	CR	CR	CR	1
Meath	CR	CR	CR	GS	JM	CR	JM	JM	JM	CR	TBD	1
Offaly	QF	QF	SF	SF	5th	JM	CR	CR	JM	JM	JM	5
Westmeath	GS	QF	QF	QF	JM	JM	JM	JM	5th	6th	JM	6
Wexford	SF	SF	QF	2nd	3rd	1st	SF	SF	3rd	4th		11

== Least successful counties ==
Out of the 16 counties who have participated, nine counties have never been represented in a Leinster SHC Final. These Antrim, Carlow, Kerry, Kildare, London, Longford, Louth, Meath and Wicklow. Six of these counties have never competed in a semi-final: Antrim, Kerry, London, Longford, Louth and Wicklow.

Kerry transferred from the Munster Senior Hurling Championship for a couple of years but have been transferred back, making them currently ineligible for the championship.

=== Levels ===
In the last few years, Leinster counties can be divided into four levels or tiers, based on results: Tier 1 counties are consistent participants in the latter stage of the Leinster championship. Tier 2 counties regularly compete in the championship. Tier 3 counties are not consistent participants in the championship.

Tier 1 counties (4): Dublin, Galway, Kilkenny, Wexford

Tier 2 counties (5): Antrim, Carlow, Laois, Offaly, Westmeath

Tier 3 counties (7): Kerry, Kildare, London, Longford, Louth, Meath, Wicklow

== Team participation ==
=== Debut of counties ===
Year	Debutants	Total
1888	Dublin, Kildare, Kilkenny, Laois	4
1889	Louth	1
1890	Wexford	1
1891-96	None	0
1897	Offaly	1
1898-1912	None	0
1913	Westmeath	1
1914-18	None	0
1919	Meath	1
1920-42	None	0
1943	Wicklow	1
1944-62	None	0
1963	Carlow	1
1964-2008	None	0
2009	Antrim, Galway	2
2010-12	None	0
2013	London	1
2014-15	None	0
2016	Kerry	1
2017-	None	0
**Total**		**15**

=== Seasons in Leinster SHC ===
The number of years that each county has played in the Leinster SHC between 1888 and 2024. A total of 15 counties have competed in at least one season of the Leinster SHC. Dublin have participated in the most championships. The counties in bold participate in the 2024 Leinster Senior Hurling Championship.

Years	Counties
131	**Dublin**
128	**Kilkenny**
124	**Wexford**
16	**Galway**
10	**Antrim**
4	Louth
2	Kerry, London
?	**Carlow**
?	Westmeath
?	Offaly
?	Laois
?	Meath
?	Kildare
?	Wicklow

=== List of Leinster Senior Hurling Championship counties ===
The following teams have competed in the Leinster Championship for at least one season.

Team	Total years	First year in Championship	Most recent year in Championship	Championship titles	Last Championship title	Most recent championship finish	Best Leinster SHC finish	Current Championship	Lvl
Antrim	10	2009	2024	0	—	5th	5th	Leinster Senior Hurling Championship	1
Carlow		1963	2024	0	—	Champions (Joe McDonagh Cup)	Semi-finals	Leinster Senior Hurling Championship	1
Dublin	131	1888	2024	24	2013	3rd	**1st**	Leinster Senior Hurling Championship	1
Galway	16	2009	2024	3	2018	Runners-up	**1st**	Leinster Senior Hurling Championship	1
Kerry	2	2016	2017	0	—	4th (Joe McDonagh Cup)	Group stage	Joe McDonagh Cup	2
Kildare		1888	2004	0	—	6th (Joe McDonagh Cup)	Semi-finals	Christy Ring Cup	3
Kilkenny	128	1888	2024	75	2023	Champions	**1st**	Leinster Senior Hurling Championship	1
Laois		1888	2022	3	1949	3rd (Joe McDonagh Cup)	**1st**	Joe McDonagh Cup	2
London	2	2013	2014	0	—	4th (Christy Ring Cup)	First round	Christy Ring Cup	3
Louth	4	1889	1920	0	—	5th (Nicky Rackard Cup)	Quarter-finals	Nicky Rackard Cup	4
Meath		1919	2017	0	—	Champions (Christy Ring Cup)	Semi-finals	Joe McDonagh Cup	2
Offaly		1897	2018	9	1995	Runners-up (Joe McDonagh Cup)	**1st**	Joe McDonagh Cup	2
Westmeath		1913	2023	0	—	6th	2nd	Joe McDonagh Cup	2
Wexford	124	1890	2024	21	2019	4th	**1st**	Leinster Senior Hurling Championship	1
Wicklow		1943	2004	0	—	Champions (Nicky Rackard Cup)	Quarter-finals	Christy Ring Cup	3

== All-time Leinster Senior Hurling Championship rankings ==
=== All-time table (since introduction of round robin) ===
Legend

Colours
Currently competing in the Leinster Senior Hurling Championship
Currently competing in the Joe McDonagh Cup

As of 13 April 2026. (after 2025 championship). Includes final replays.

#	Team	Pld	W	D	L	Points
1	Kilkenny	39	26	5	8	57
2	Galway	36	21	6	9	48
3	Dublin	34	17	4	13	38
4	Wexford	32	14	6	12	34
5	Antrim	16	3	1	12	7
6	Westmeath	10	2	1	7	5
7	Offaly	9	1	0	8	2
8	Carlow	9	0	1	8	1
9	Laois	7	0	0	7	0
10	Kildare	0	0	0	0	0

== Teams ==
=== Winning Teams ===
All-Ireland champions
All-Ireland runners-up

Year	Winners	Captain	Winning team
1888^{[A]}	Kilkenny	John Quinn	J Quinn, J Fox, P Quinn, P Quinn, W Ryan, J Henneberry, P Synnott, J Walsh, J Hanrahan, P Fogarty, J Roche, J Rockett, John Phelan, James Phelan, W Walsh, M Walsh, W Fox, P Walsh, A Kenny, M Murphy, R Hogan.
1889^{[B]}	Dublin	Nicholas O'Shea	
1890	Wexford	Nick Daly	
1891	Wexford	Nick Daly	
1892^{[C]}	Dublin	Paddy Egan	
1893	Kilkenny	Dick Whelan	
1894^{[D]}	Dublin	John McCabe	
1895	Kilkenny	James Grace	
1896 (R)^{[E]}	Dublin	Paddy Buckley	
1897	Kilkenny	Jackie Walsh	
1898	Kilkenny	Ned Hennessy	
1899	Wexford	Jim Furlong	
1900	Kilkenny	Dick 'Manager' Walsh	
1901	Wexford	Jim Furlong	
1902	Dublin	Danny McCormack	
1903^{[F]}	Kilkenny	Jer Doheny	
1904	Kilkenny	Jer Doheny	
1905	Kilkenny	D.J. Stapleton	
1906	Dublin	Tom Hayes	
1907	Kilkenny	Dick 'Drug' Walsh	
1908	Dublin		
1909	Kilkenny	Dick 'Drug' Walsh	
1910	Wexford	Dick Doyle	
1911	Kilkenny	Sim Walton	
1912	Kilkenny	Sim Walton	
1913 (R)	Kilkenny	Dick 'Drug' Walsh	
1914	Laois	Jack Carroll	
1915	Laois	Jack Finlay	
1916	Kilkenny	Sim Walton	
1917	Dublin	John Ryan	
1918	Wexford	Mick Cummins	
1919	Dublin	Charlie Stuart	
1920	Dublin	Bob Mockler	
1921	Dublin	Bob Mockler	
1922	Kilkenny	Wattie Dunphy	
1923	Kilkenny	Wattie Dunphy	
1924	Dublin	Frank Wall	
1925^{[G]}	Kilkenny	Dick Grace	
1926	Kilkenny	Dick Grace	
1927	Dublin	Mick Gill	
1928	Dublin	Mick Gill	
1929^{[H]}	Kilkenny	Wattie Dunphy	
1930	Dublin	Jim Walsh	
1931	Kilkenny	Lory Meagher	
1932	Kilkenny	Jimmy Walsh	
1933	Kilkenny	Eddie Doyle	
1934 (R)	Dublin	Steve Hegarty	
1935	Kilkenny	Lory Meagher	
1936	Kilkenny	Paddy Larkin	
1937	Kilkenny	Larry Duggan	
1938 (R)	Dublin	Mick Daniels	
1939	Kilkenny	Jimmy Walsh	
1940	Kilkenny	Jim Langton	J O’Connell, P Grace, P Larkin, P Blanchfield, B Hinks, B Burke, P Phelan, J Kelly, J Walsh, J Langton, T Leahy, J Gargan, J Mulcahy, S O’Brien, J Phelan. Sub: P Boyle.
1941	Dublin	Ned Wade	D Conway, P Farrell, M Butler, C McMahon, F White, D Davitt, J Byrne, M Gleeson, H Gray, M McDonnell, T Leahy, J Roche, E O’Boyle, P Maher, C Downes. Sub: P McCormack.
1942	Dublin	Frank White	J Donegan, C O’Dwyer, M Butler, P McCormack, E O’Brien, F White, J Byrne, S Skehal, H Gray, M Ryan, N Wade, M McDonnell, P McMahon, P Kennedy, J Hickey.
1943	Kilkenny	Jimmy Walsh	J Gilmartin, P Grace, P Larkin, P Blanchfield, E Fitzpatrick, B Burke, M Neary, J Walsh, T Wall, T Walsh, J Langton, J Kelly, J Mulcahy, S O’Brien, T Murphy. Subs: J Phelan, M Heffernan.
1944	Dublin	Mick Butler	J Donegan, D Davitt, M Butler, P McCormack, F White, C Flanagan, J Egan, M Hassett, H Gray, T Leahy, N Wade, J Byrne, P Maher, C Downes, M Ryan. Sub: J O’Neill.
1945	Kilkenny	Peter Blanchfield	J Walsh (Éire Óg), P Grace, M Kelly, P Blanchfield, J Heffernan, J Meagher, B Walsh, D Kennedy, T Murphy, J Gargan, J Langton, L Reidy, T Walton, S O’Brien, J Mulcahy. Sub: D Teehan.
1946	Kilkenny	Jack Mulcahy	J Donegan, P Grace, M Butler, B Walsh, J Heffernan, J Meagher, J Mulcahy, D Kennedy, T Leahy, J Gargan, J Langton, T Murphy, T Walton, P O’Brien, S O’Brien. Sub: J Kelly.
1947	Kilkenny	Dan Kennedy	J Donegan, P Grace, P Hayden, B Walsh, J Kelly, P Prendergast, M Marnell, D Kennedy, J Heffernan, S Downey, T Leahy, L Reidy, T Walton, P O’Brien, P Lennon.
1948	Dublin	Frank Cummins	K Matthews, N Dunphy, D Walsh, S Cronin, T Herbert, J Butler, P Donnelly, L Donnelly, D Cantwell, J Kennedy, M Williams, S Óg Ó Ceallacháin, P Thornton, J Prior, F Cummins. Sub: C Keely.
1949	Laois	Paddy Ruschitzko	T Fitzpatrick, L White, J Bergin, P McCormack, J Murray, T Byrne, P Ruschitzko, J Styles, B Bohane, P Hogan, P O’Brien, B Dargan, P Lalor, H Gray, P Kelly.
1950	Kilkenny	John Keane	R Dowling, J Hogan, P Hayden, M Marnell, P Buggy, P Prendergast, J Keane, B Walsh, S Downey, PJ Garvan, M Kenny, J Langton, J Heffernan, D Kennedy, L Reidy.
1951	Wexford	Nicky Rackard	J Rackard, M Byrne, N O’Donnell, M O’Hanlon, S Thorpe, Bobby Rackard, Billy Rackard, N Wheeler, J Morrissey, Podge Kehoe, J Cummins, T Russell, Paddy Kehoe, N Rackard, T Flood. Sub: B Donovan.
1952	Dublin	Jim Prior	K Matthews, S Cronin, P Ryan, S Óg Ó Ceallacháin, D Ferguson, J Prior, T Fahy, M Wilson, C Murphy, G Kelly, R McCarthy, T Kelly, J Finnan, A O’Brien, T Herbert.
1953	Kilkenny	Padge Kehoe	R Dowling, J Hogan, P Hayden, M Marnell, P Buggy, J Heffernan, J McGovern, B Walsh, J Sutton, S Clohosey, D Kennedy, D Carroll, J Langton, S Downey, M Kelly.
1954	Wexford	Padge Kehoe	A Foley, B Rackard, N O’Donnell, M O’Hanlon, J English, Bobby Rackard, B Donovan, J Morrissey, S Hearne, Podge Kehoe, N Wheeler, D Aherne, T Ryan, N Rackard, T Flood.
1955 (R)	Wexford	Nick O'Donnell	A Foley, Billy Rackard, N O’Donnell, M O’Hanlon, J English, Bobby Rackard, M Morrissey, J Morrissey, S Hearne, O Gough, Podge Kehoe, N Wheeler, T Ryan, N Rackard, T Flood. Sub: D Aherne.
1956	Wexford	Jim English	A Foley, Bobbie Rackard, N O’Donnell, T Morrissey, J English, Billy Rackard, M Morrissey, J Morrissey, N Wheeler, Paddy Kehoe, T Flood, Podge Kehoe, T Ryan, N Rackard, T Dixon.
1957	Kilkenny	Mickey Kelly	O Walsh, T Walsh (Dunnamaggin), J Walsh, J Maher, P Buggy, M Walsh, J McGovern, M Brophy, J Sutton, D Heaslip, M Kenny, M Kelly, D Rockett, B Dwyer, S Clohosey.
1958	Kilkenny	Mick Kenny	O Walsh, T Walsh (Dunnamaggin), J Walsh, J Maher, P Buggy, M Walsh, J McGovern, M Brophy, J Sutton, M Fleming, M Kenny, M Kelly, D Rockett, B Dwyer, S Clohosey. Sub: L Cleere.
1959	Kilkenny	Seán Clohessy	O Walsh, T Walsh (Dunnamaggin), J Walsh, J Maher, M Walsh, M Treacy, J McGovern, M Brophy, P Kelly, D Heaslip, D Carroll, M Fleming, S Clohosey, L Cleere, T O’Connell. Subs: T Kelly, M Brophy, M Kelly.
1960	Wexford	Nick O'Donnell	P Nolan, J Mitchell, N O’Donnell, T Neville, J English, Billy Rackard, M Morrissey, N Wheeler, S Power, Podge Kehoe, J Morrissey, S Quaid, O McGrath, J Harding, J O’Brien.
1961	Dublin	Noel Drumgoole	J Grey, D Ferguson, N Drumgoole, L Foley, L Ferguson, C Hayes, S Lynch, D Foley, F Whelan, A Boothman, M Bohan, L Shannon, B Boothman, P Croke, B Jackson.
1962	Wexford	Billy Rackard	P Nolan, T Neville, N O’Donnell, N Colfer, J English, B Rackard, J Nolan, M Lyng, P Wilson, J O’Brien, P Kehoe, P Lynch, O McGrath, N Wheeler, T Flood.
1963	Kilkenny	Séamus Cleere	O Walsh, P Larkin, C Whelan, M Treacy, S Cleere, T Carroll, M Coogan, P Moran, T Kelly, S Clohosey, J McGovern, E Keher, T Walsh (Thomastown), B Dwyer, T Murphy.
1964	Kilkenny	Seán Buckley	O Walsh, P Larkin, P Dillon, J Treacy, S Cleere, T Carroll, P Henderson, P Moran, S Buckley, T Kelly, J Teehan, E Keher, T Walsh (Thomastown), T Forristal, T Murphy. Sub: D Heaslip.
1965	Wexford	Tom Neville	P Nolan, W O’Neill, D Quigley, N Colfer, V Staples, T Neville, W Murphy, P Wilson, M Byrne, J O’Brien, C Dowdall, D Shannon, O McGrath, M Codd, J Foley.
1966	Kilkenny	Jim Lynch	O Walsh, P Henderson, J Lynch, J Treacy, S Cleere, T Carroll, M Coogan, P Moran, J Teehan, E Keher, P Carroll, S Buckley, T Walsh (Thomastown), P Dillon, J Dunphy. Sub: C Dunne.
1967	Kilkenny	Jim Treacy	O Walsh, T Carroll, P Dillon, J Treacy, S Cleere, P Henderson, M Coogan, P Moran, C Dunne, E Keher, J Bennett, T Walsh (Thomastown), P Foley, J Lynch, D Blanchfield.
1968	Wexford	Dan Quigley	P Nolan, T Neville, E Kelly, N Colfer, V Staples, D Quigley, W Murphy, P Wilson, D Bernie, J Quigley, P Lynch, C Jacob, J O’Brien, J Berry, T Doran. Subs: S Whelan, M Browne.
1969	Kilkenny	Eddie Keher	O Walsh, T Carroll, P Dillon, J Treacy, W Murphy (Rower-Inistioge), P Henderson, M Coogan, P Moran, M Lawler, P Lawlor, P Delaney, E Keher, J Millea, J Lynch, M Brennan. Subs: J Kinsella, S Buckley.
1970^{[I]}	Wexford	Michael Collins	P Nolan, N Colfer, M Collins, T Neville, M Browne, D Quigley, W Murphy, D Bernie, P Wilson, M Quigley, J Quigley, N Buggy, P Quigley, T Doran, J Berry. Subs: T O’Connor, A Somers.
1971	Kilkenny	Pat Henderson	O Walsh, P Larkin, P Dillon, J Treacy, P Lawlor, W Murphy (Rower-Inistioge), M Coogan, F Cummins, M Lawler, M Murphy, P Delaney, E Keher, M Brennan, K Purcell, N Byrne. Sub: P Cullen.
1972 (R)	Kilkenny	Noel Skehan	N Skehan, P Larkin, P Dillon, J Treacy, P Lawlor, P Henderson, M Coogan, F Cummins, L O’Brien, J Kinsella, P Delaney, E Keher, M Murphy, K Purcell, M Crotty. Subs: E Morrissey, N Byrne.
1973	Kilkenny	Pat Delaney	N Skehan, P Larkin, N Orr, J Treacy, P Lawlor, P Henderson, E Morrissey, F Cummins, L O’Brien, M Brennan, K Purcell, P Broderick, M Crotty, P Delaney, E Keher.
1974	Kilkenny	Nicky Orr	N Skehan, P Larkin, N Orr, J Treacy, P Lawlor, P Henderson, G Henderson, F Cummins, B Harte, L O’Brien, P Delaney, M Crotty, M Brennan, K Purcell, E Keher. Subs: N Brennan, B Fitzpatrick.
1975^{[J]}	Kilkenny	Billy Fitzpatrick	N Skehan, P Larkin, N Orr, B Cody, P Lawlor, P Henderson, T McCormack, F Cummins, L O’Brien, M Crotty, P Delaney, B Fitzpatrick, M Brennan, K Purcell, E Keher. Sub: G Henderson.
1976	Wexford	Tony Doran	J Nolan, T O’Connor, W Murphy, J Prendergast, L Bennett, C Doran, N Buggy, M Jacob, B Rowesome, J Murphy, M Quigley, J Quigley, M Butler, T Doran, C Keogh.
1977	Wexford	Tony Doran	J Nolan, T O’Connor, W Murphy, J Prendergast, E Walsh, C Doran, B Rowesome, M Jacob, N Buggy, C Keogh, M Quigley, J Quigley, M Butler, T Doran, J Murphy. Subs: D Bernie, M Casey.
1978	Kilkenny	Ger Henderson	N Skehan, P Prendergast, P Larkin, D O’Hara, J Hennessy, G Henderson, R Reid, F Cummins, M Kennedy, L O’Brien, B Fitzpatrick, K Brennan, M Brennan, B Cody, M Ruth. Subs: M Crotty, G Fennelly.
1979	Kilkenny	Ger Fennelly	N Skehan, J Henderson, P Larkin, P Prendergast, N Brennan, G Henderson, R Reid, J Hennessy, G Fennelly, B Fitzpatrick, F Cummins, L O’Brien, M Brennan, M Crotty, M Ruth. Sub: K Fennelly.
1980	Offaly	Pádraig Horan	D Martin, P Moloughney, M Kennedy, P Fluery, A Fogarty, P Delaney, G Coughlan, J Kelly, B Keeshan, M Corrigan, B Bermingham, P Carroll, P Kirwan, P Horan, J Flaherty. Subs: E Coughlan, M Cashin.
1981	Offaly	Pádraig Horan	D Martin, T Donoghue, E Coughlan, P Fluery, A Fogarty, P Delaney, G Coughlan, J Kelly, L Currams, P Kirwan, B Bermingham, M Corrigan, P Carroll, P Horan, J Flaherty. Sub: D Owens.
1982	Kilkenny	Brian Cody	N Skehan, J Henderson, B Cody, D O’Hara, N Brennan, G Henderson, P Prendergast, J Hennessy, F Cummins, G Fennelly, R Power, B Fitzpatrick, M Brennan, L Fennelly, K Brennan. Subs: T McCormack, M Ruth, W Purcell.
1983	Kilkenny	Liam Fennelly	N Skehan, J Henderson, B Cody, D O’Hara, J Hennessy, G Henderson, P Prendergast, F Cummins, G Fennelly, R Power, K Brennan, H Ryan, B Fitzpatrick, C Heffernan, L Fennelly.
1984	Offaly	Pat Fleury	D Martin, L Carroll, E Coughlan, P Fluery, A Fogarty, P Delaney, G Coughlan, T Conneely, J Kelly, P Corrigan, B Bermingham, P Carroll, D Fogarty, P Horan, J Dooley. Subs: M Corrigan, B Keeshan.
1985	Offaly	Pat Fleury	J Troy, A Fogarty, E Coughlan, P Fluery, T Conneely, P Delaney, G Coughlan, D Owens, J Kelly, P Corrigan, P Carroll, M Corrigan, P Cleary, P Horan, J Dooley. Sub: B Bermingham.
1986	Kilkenny	Frank Holohan	K Fennelly, P Prendergast, J Henderson, F Holohan, J Hennessy, G Henderson, S Fennelly, G Fennelly, R Power, P Walsh, C Heffernan, K Brennan, L Ryan, L Fennelly, H Ryan. Sub: B Fitzpatrick.
1987	Kilkenny	Paddy Prendergast	K Fennelly, J Hennessy, P Prendergast, J Henderson, L Walsh, G Henderson, S Fennelly, G Fennelly, L Ryan, R Power, C Heffernan, P Walsh, L McCarthy, H Ryan, L Fennelly. Subs: K Brennan, T Lennon.
1988	Offaly	Aidan Fogarty	J Troy, J Miller, A Fogarty, M Hanamy, B Keeshan, M Coughlan, G Coughlan, M Duignan, D Owens, V Teehan, P Delaney, M Corrigan, P Cleary, E Coughlan, J Dooley. Subs: J Kelly, P O’Connor.
1989	Offaly	Mark Corrigan	J Troy, A Fogarty, E Coughlan, M Hanamy, R Mannion, P Delaney, G Coughlan, J Kelly, J Pilkington, M Duignan, D Regan, M Corrigan, D Owens, V Teehan, D Pilkington. Subs: J Dooley, P Corrigan.
1990	Offaly	Jim Troy	J Troy, A Fogarty, E Coughlan, M Hanamy, B Whelehan, B Kelly, G Coughlan, J Pilkington, D Owens, M Duignan, D Regan, M Corrigan, P Cleary, J Kelly, D Pilkington. Sub: R Mannion.
1991	Kilkenny	Christy Heffernan	M Walsh, E O’Connor, J Henderson, L Simpson, B Hennessy, P Dwyer, T Fogarty, R Power, M Phelan, DJ Carey, J Power, A Ronan, E Morrissey, C Heffernan, L Fennelly. Subs: M Cleere, L Ryan, J Brennan.
1992	Kilkenny	Liam Fennelly	M Walsh, E O’Connor, P Dwyer, L Simpson, L Walsh, P O’Neill, W O’Connor, M Phelan, B Hennessy, L McCarthy, J Power, DJ Carey, E Morrissey, L Fennelly, A Ronan. Subs: C Heffernan, J Brennan.
1993 (R)	Kilkenny	Eddie O'Connor	M Walsh, E O’Connor, P Dwyer, L Simpson, L Keoghan, P O’Neill, W O’Connor, M Phelan, B Hennessy, J Brennan, J Power, DJ Carey, E Morrissey, PJ Delaney, A Ronan. Subs: J Walsh, C Heffernan.
1994	Offaly	Martin Hanamy	D Hughes, S McGuckan, K Kinahan, M Hanamy, B Whelehan, H Rigney, K Martin, J Pilkington, D Regan, J Dooley, J Troy, J Dooley, B Dooley, B Kelly, M Duignan. Subs: D Pilkington.
1995	Offaly	Johnny Pilkington	D Hughes, S McGuckan, K Kinahan, M Hanamy, B Whelehan, H Rigney, K Martin, J Pilkington, D Regan, J Dooley, J Troy, J Dooley, B Dooley, P O’Connor, M Duignan. Subs: B Kelly, D Pilkington.
1996	Wexford	Martin Storey	D Fitzhenry, C Kehoe, G Cushe, J O’Connor, R Guiney, L Dunne, S Flood, A Fenlon, L O’Gorman, R McCarthy, M Storey, L Murphy, T Dempsey, G Laffan, E Scallan. Subs: B Byrne, G O’Connor.
1997	Wexford	Rod Guiney	D Fitzhenry, C Kehoe, G Cushe, E Furlong, R Guiney, L Dunne, S Flood, A Fenlon, L O’Gorman, R McCarthy, M Storey, L Murphy, P Codd, G Laffan, T Dempsey. Subs: D Guiney, B Byrne.
1998	Kilkenny	Tom Hickey	J Dermody, T Hickey, P O’Neill, WW O’Connor, M Kavanagh, C Brennan, L Keoghan, P Larkin, P Barry, DJ Carey, J Dooley, B McEvoy, N Moloney, PJ Delaney, C Carter. Subs: A Comerford, K O’Shea, M Phelan.
1999	Kilkenny	Denis Byrne	J McGarry, T Hickey, C Brennan, W O’Connor, M Kavanagh, E Kennedy, P Mullally, A Comerford, D Byrne, DJ Carey, J Power, B McEvoy, K O’Shea, H Shefflin, C Carter. Sub: Moloney.
2000	Kilkenny	Willie O'Connor	J McGarry; M Kavanagh, N Hickey, W O'Connor; P Larkin, E Kennedy, P Barry; A Comerford, B McEvoy; S Grehan, J Power, D Byrne; C Carter, D J Carey, H Shefflin. Subs: A Cummins, J Hoyne, E Brennan.
2001	Kilkenny	Denis Byrne	J McGarry; M Kavanagh, N Hickey, JJ Delaney; P Larkin, E Kennedy, S Dowling; A Comerford, C Brennan; D Byrne, J Hoyne, B McEvoy; C Carter, DJ Carey, H Shefflin. Subs: E Brennan, S Grehan.
2002	Kilkenny	Andy Comerford	J McGarry; M Kavanagh, N Hickey, P Larkin; R Mullally, P Barry, JJ Delaney; D Lyng, A Comerford; J Hoyne, H Shefflin, B McEvoy; E Brennan, M Comerford, C Carter. Subs: S Grehan, A Geoghegan, S Dowling, B Dowling.
2003	Kilkenny	D.J. Carey	J McGarry; M Kavanagh, N Hickey, J Ryall; S Dowling, P Barry, JJ Delaney; D Lyng, C Phelan; J Hoyne, H Shefflin, T Walsh; DJ Carey, M Comerford, E Brennan.
2004	Wexford	John O'Connor	D Fitzhenry; M Travers, D Ryan, D O’Connor; R McCarthy, D Ruth, J O’Connor; A Fenlon, T Mahon; BP Carley, E Quigley, B Lambert; M Jordan, M Jacob, R Jacob. Subs: P Codd, C McGrath.
2005	Kilkenny	Peter Barry	J McGarry; J Tyrrell, N Hickey, J Ryall; P Mullally, P. Barry, JJ Delaney; D Lyng, B Barry; M Comerford, E Larkin, T Walsh, C Phelan, H Shefflin. Subs: E McCormack, E Brennan, M Kavanagh, M Phelan, J Hoyne.
2006	Kilkenny	Jackie Tyrrell	J McGarry; D Cody, JJ Delaney, N Hickey; J Tyrrell, J Tennyson, T Walsh; D Lyng, R Mullally, E Brennan, J Fitzpatrick, M Rice; M Comerford, E Larkin, H Shefflin. Subs: M Fennelly, R Power, W O'Dwyer.
2007	Kilkenny	Henry Shefflin	PJ Ryan; M Kavanagh, N Hickey, J Tyrell; T Walsh, B Hogan, JJ Delaney; J Fitzpatrick, M Fennelly; M Comerford, E Brennan, E Larkin; E Reid, H Shefflin, W O'Dwyer. Subs: J Ryall, J Dalton, J Tennyson, M Rice, D Cody.
2008	Kilkenny	James "Cha" Fitzpatrick	PJ Ryan; M Kavanagh, JJ Delaney, J Dalton; T Walsh, B Hogan, PJ Delaney; J Fitzpatrick, J Tyrrell; M Comerford, Derek Lyng, E Larkin; R Power, H Shefflin, E Brennan. Subs: A Fogarty, W O'Dwyer, M Rice, R Mullally.
2009	Kilkenny	Michael Fennelly	PJ Ryan; M Kavanagh, JJ Delaney, J Tyrrell; T Walsh, J Tennyson, J Dalton; D Lyng, M Rice; H Shefflin, M Comerford, E Larkin; E Brennan, R Power, A Fogarty. Subs: TJ Reid, J Fitzpatrick.
2010	Kilkenny	T. J. Reid	PJ Ryan; J Dalton, N Hickey, J Tyrrell; T Walsh, B Hogan, JJ Delaney; M Rice, M Fennelly; TJ Reid, E Brennan, E Larkin; M Comerford, R Power, H Shefflin. Subs: J Tennyson, A Fogarty, R Hogan, J Mulhall.
2011	Kilkenny	Brian Hogan	D Herrity, N Hickey, JJ Delaney, J Tyrrell, T Walsh, B Hogan, P Murphy, M Fennelly, M Rice, TJ Reid, R Power, E Larkin, C Fennelly, H Shefflin, R Hogan. Subs: P Hogan, J Fitzpatrick, J Mulhall, M Ruth.
2012	Galway	Fergal Moore	J Skehill; F Moore, K Hynes, J Coen; D Collins, T Og Regan, N Donoghue; I Tannian, A Smyrg; N Burke, D Burke, D Hayes; J Canning, C Cooney, C Donnellan. Subs: J Glynn, J Regan, T Haran, J Cooney.
2013	Dublin	John McCaffrey	G Maguire, N Corcoran, P Kelly, P Schutte, S Hiney, L Rushe, M Carton, J McCaffrey, J Boland, C Keaney, R O'Dwyer, D Sutcliffe, D O'Callaghan, D Treacy, P Ryan. Subs: A Smith, C McCormack, O Gough, S Durkin, M Schutte, S Lambert.
2014	Kilkenny	Lester Ryan	D Herity; P Murphy, JJ Delaney, J Tyrrell; J Holden, B Hogan, C Buckley; R Hogan, C Fogarty; P Walsh, C Fennelly, TJ Reid; W Walsh, E Larkin, J Power. Subs: H Shefflin, A Fogarty, L Ryan
2015	Kilkenny	Joey Holden	E Murphy; P Murphy, J Holden, J Tyrrell; P Walsh, K Joyce, C Buckley; C Fogarty, W Walsh; R Hogan, J Power, C Fennelly; G Aylward, TJ Reid, E Larkin. Subs: S Prendergast, M Kelly, M Ruth.
2016	Kilkenny	Lester Ryan	E Murphy; P Murphy, J Holden, R. Lennon; P Walsh, K Joyce, C Buckley; C Fogarty, M. Fennelly, W. Walsh, C. Fennelly, L. Ryan, JJ Farrell, TJ Reid, E. Larkin. Subs: R. Hogan, J. Power
2017	Galway	David Burke	C Callanan; A Tuohy, Daithi Burke, A Harte; P Mannion, G McInerney, J Hanbury; J Coen, David Burke; J Cooney, J Canning, J Flynn; C Whelan, C Cooney), N Burke. Subs: T Monaghan, S Maloney, G Lally, S Loftus
2018	Galway	David Burke	J Skehill; A Tuohey, D Burke, J Hanbury; P Mannion, G McInerney, A Harte; J Coen, D Bourke; J Cooney, J Canning, N Burke; C Whelan, J Glynn, C Mannion. Subs: C Cooney for N Burke (46), J Flynn for J Cooney (61), S Loftus for D Burke (69)
2019	Wexford	Lee Chin	M Fanning; S Murphy, L Ryan, S Donohoe; M O'Hanlon, P Foley, S Reck; D O'Keeffe, L Og McGovern; J O'Connor, L Chin, R O'Connor; K Foley, C McDonald, P Morris. Subs: C Firman for S Reck, C Dunbar for P Morris, D Dunne for L Og McGovern, H Kehoe for C McDonald.
2020	Kilkenny	Colin Fennelly	E Murphy; C Delaney, H Lawlor, T Walsh; P Walsh, C Buckley, C Browne; R Leahy, C Fogarty; J Donnelly, M Keoghan, TJ Reid; W Walsh, C Fennelly, E Cody. Subs: R Hogan for W Walsh (45); L Blanchfield for Fennelly (51); R Reid for Fogarty (56); N Brassil for E Cody (60); A Murphy for Leahy (inj 61);
2021	Kilkenny	Adrian Mullen	E Murphy; T Walsh, P Deegan, H Lawlor; J Maher, P Walsh, C Browne; R Reid, R Leahy; B Ryan, M Keoghan, A Mullen; E Cody, TJ Reid, J Donnelly. Subs: M Carey for Browne (25); A Murphy for Leahy (ht); C Buckley for R Reid (46); W Walsh for Ryan (47); J Bergin for Cody (64)
2022	Kilkenny	Richie Reid	

== Other records ==
=== By Semi-Final/Top 4 Appearances (2015–present) ===
Team	No.	Years
Kilkenny	12	2015, 2016, 2017, 2018, 2019, 2020, 2021, 2022, 2023, 2024, 2025, 2026
Galway	12	2015, 2016, 2017, 2018, 2019, 2020, 2021, 2022, 2023, 2024, 2025, 2026
Wexford	10	2015, 2017, 2018, 2019, 2020, 2021, 2022, 2023, 2024, 2025
Dublin	10	2016, 2018, 2019, 2020, 2021, 2022, 2023, 2024, 2025, 2026
Offaly	3	2016, 2017, 2026
Laois	1	2015

=== Winners By decade ===
The most successful team of each decade, judged by number of Leinster Senior Hurling Championship titles, is as follows:

- 1880s: 1 each for Kilkenny (1888) and Dublin (1889)
- 1890s: 4 for Kilkenny (1893, 1895, 1897, 1898)
- 1900s: 6 for Kilkenny (1900, 1903, 1904, 1905, 1907, 1909)
- 1910s: 4 for Kilkenny (1911, 1912, 1913, 1916)
- 1920s: 5 each for Dublin (1920, 1921, 1924, 1927, 1928) and Kilkenny (1922, 1923, 1925, 1926, 1929)
- 1930s: 7 for Kilkenny (1931-1932-1933-1935-1936-1937-1939)
- 1940s: 5 for Kilkenny (1940-1943-1945-1946-1947)
- 1950s: 5 for Kilkenny (1950-1953-1957-1958-1959)
- 1960s: 4 each for Wexford (1960-1962-1965-1968) and Kilkenny (1963-1966-1967-1969)
- 1970s: 7 for Kilkenny (1971-1972-1973-1974-1975-1978-1979)
- 1980s: 6 for Offaly (1980, 1981, 1984, 1985, 1988, 1989)
- 1990s: 5 for Kilkenny (1991-1992-1993-1998-1999)
- 2000s: 9 for Kilkenny (2000, 2001, 2002, 2003, 2005, 2006, 2007, 2008, 2009)
- 2010s: 5 for Kilkenny (2010, 2011, 2014, 2015, 2016)
- 2020s: 6 for Kilkenny (2020, 2021, 2022, 2023, 2024, 2025)

=== Consecutive Wins ===
==== Septuple ====
- Kilkenny (2005, 2006, 2007, 2008, 2009, 2010, 2011)

==== Sextuple ====
- Kilkenny (1998, 1999, 2000, 2001, 2002, 2003)
- Kilkenny (2020, 2021, 2022, 2023, 2024, 2025)

==== Quintuple ====
- Kilkenny (1971, 1972, 1973, 1974, 1975)

==== Treble ====
- Kilkenny (1903, 1904, 1905)
- Kilkenny (1911, 1912, 1913)
- Dublin (1919, 1920, 1921)
- Kilkenny (1931, 1932, 1933)
- Kilkenny (1935, 1936, 1937)
- Kilkenny (1945, 1946, 1947)
- Wexford (1954, 1955, 1956)
- Kilkenny (1957, 1958, 1959)
- Offaly (1988, 1989, 1990)
- Kilkenny (1991, 1992, 1993)
- Kilkenny (2014, 2015, 2016)

==== Double ====
- Wexford (1890, 1891)
- Kilkenny (1897, 1898)
- Laois (1914, 1915)
- Kilkenny (1922, 1923)
- Kilkenny (1925, 1926)
- Dublin (1927, 1928)
- Kilkenny (1939, 1940)
- Dublin (1941, 1942)
- Kilkenny (1963, 1964)
- Kilkenny (1966, 1967)
- Wexford (1976, 1977)
- Kilkenny (1978, 1979)
- Offaly (1980, 1981)
- Kilkenny (1982, 1983)
- Offaly (1984, 1985)
- Kilkenny (1986, 1987)
- Offaly (1994, 1995)
- Wexford (1996, 1997)
- Galway (2017, 2018)

==== Single ====
- Dublin (1889, 1892, 1894, 1896, 1902, 1906, 1908, 1917, 1924, 1930, 1934, 1938, 1944, 1948, 1952, 1961, 2013)
- Wexford (1899, 1901, 1910, 1918, 1951, 1960, 1962, 1965, 1968, 1970, 2004, 2019)
- Kilkenny (1888, 1893, 1895, 1900, 1907, 1909, 1916, 1943, 1950, 1953, 1969)
- Laois (1949)
- Galway (2012)

=== Finishing positions ===
- Most championships
  - 77, Kilkenny (1888, 1893, 1895, 1897, 1898, 1900, 1903, 1904, 1905, 1907, 1909, 1911, 1912, 1913, 1916, 1922, 1923, 1925, 1926, 1931, 1932, 1933, 1935, 1936, 1937, 1939, 1940, 1943, 1945, 1946, 1947, 1950, 1953, 1957, 1958, 1959, 1963, 1964, 1966, 1967, 1969, 1971, 1972, 1973, 1974, 1975, 1978, 1979, 1982, 1983, 1986, 1987, 1991, 1992, 1993, 1998, 1999, 2000, 2001, 2002, 2003, 2005, 2006, 2007, 2008, 2009, 2010, 2011, 2014, 2015, 2016, 2020, 2021, 2022, 2023, 2024, 2025)
- Most second-place finishes
  - 37, Dublin (1888, 1893, 1895, 1898, 1899, 1900, 1903, 1904, 1905, 1907, 1910, 1911, 1913, 1915, 1918, 1922, 1923, 1925, 1932, 1933, 1939, 1940, 1943, 1945, 1946, 1947, 1954, 1959, 1963, 1964, 1990, 1991, 2009, 2011, 2014, 2021, 2024)
- Most third-place finishes
  - 3, Wexford (2018, 2022, 2024)
  - 3, Dublin (2019, 2023, 2025)
- Most fourth-place finishes
  - 2, Dublin (2018, 2022)
  - 2, Galway (2019, 2024)
  - 2, Wexford (2023, 2025)
- Most fifth-place finishes
  - 2, Antrim (2023, 2024)
  - 2, Offaly (2018, 2025)
- Most sixth-place finishes
  - 1, Laois (2022)
  - 1, Westmeath (2023)
  - 1, Carlow (2024)
  - 1, Antrim (2025)
  - 1, Kildare (2026)
- Most semi-final finishes
  - 00, 000 (0000)
- Most quarter-final finishes
  - 00, 000 (0000)
- Most preliminary round finishes
  - 00, 000 (0000)
- Most group stage finishes
  - 00, 000 (0000)

==== Unbeaten sides ====
- 134 out of 136 winning teams have won the Leinster SHC unbeaten

==== Beaten sides ====
The group stage of the championship has resulted in 3 'back-door' Leinster SHC champions:

- Kilkenny (2022) were beaten by Galway in round 3 and Wexford in round 5.
- Kilkenny (2023) were beaten by Wexford in round 5.
- Kilkenny (2025) were beaten by Wexford in round 5.

On 1 occasion a team was defeated twice but have remained in the Leinster championship:

- Kilkenny (2022) were beaten by Galway and Wexford but still qualified for the final.

==== Final success rate ====
No county has appeared in the final, being victorious on all occasions.

On the opposite end of the scale, only one county has appeared in the final, losing on each occasion:

- Westmeath (1937)

==== Consecutive participations (in round robin) ====
- 9, Dublin (2018–2027)
- 9, Galway (2018–2027)
- 9, Kilkenny (2018–2027)
- 9, Wexford (2018–2027)

Dublin have the record number of participations in the championship overall, taking part in 137 seasons.

==== Winning other trophies ====
Although not an officially recognised achievement, a number of teams have achieved the distinction of winning the Leinster championship, the All-Ireland championship and the National Hurling League:

- Kilkenny (1933, 1982, 1983, 2002, 2003, 2006, 2009, 2014)
- Wexford (1956)
- Galway (2017)

=== Other records ===
==== Biggest wins ====
- The most one sided Leinster finals since 1896 when goals were made equal to three points:
  - 21 points – 1901: Wexford 7-06 - 1-03 Offaly
  - 19 points – 2008: Kilkenny 5-21 - 0-17 Wexford
  - 18 points – 1896: Dublin 4-06 - 0-00 Kilkenny

==== Successful defending ====
All 6 teams of the 6 who have won the Leinster championship have successfully defended the title. These are:

- Kilkenny on 42 attempts out of 73 (1898, 1904, 1905, 1912, 1913, 1923, 1926, 1932, 1933, 1936, 1937, 1940, 1946, 1947, 1958, 1959, 1967, 1972, 1973, 1974, 1975, 1979, 1983, 1987, 1992, 1993, 1999, 2000, 2001, 2002, 2003, 2006, 2007, 2008, 2009, 2010, 2011, 2015, 2016, 2021, 2022, 2023, 2024)
- Wexford on 5 attempts out of 19 (1891, 1955, 1956, 1977, 1997)
- Dublin on 4 attempts out of 23 (1920, 1921, 1928, 1942)
- Offaly on 4 attempts out of 8 (1981, 1985, 1989, 1990)
- Galway on 1 attempts out of 3 (2018)
- Laois on 1 attempts out of 2 (1915)

==== Gaps ====
- The longest gaps between successive Leinster titles:
  - 52 years: Dublin (1961–2013)
  - 34 years: Laois (1915–1949)
  - 33 years: Wexford (1918–1951)
  - 19 years: Wexford (1977–1996)
  - 15 years: Wexford (2004–2019)
  - 9 years: Wexford (1901–1910)
  - 9 years: Dublin (1908–1917)
  - 9 years: Dublin (1952–1961)
- The longest gaps between successive Leinster finals:
  - 41 years: Offaly (1928–1969)
  - 34 years: Laois (1951–1985)
  - 26 years: Wexford (1918–1944)
  - 26 years: Dublin (1964–1990)
  - 23 years: Offaly (1901–1924)
  - 18 years: Laois (1891–1909)
  - 18 years: Dublin (1991–2009)
  - 15 years: Laois (1915–1930)
  - 12 years: Laois (1936–1948)
  - 11 years: Offaly (1969–1980)
  - 9 years: Wexford (1901–1910)
  - 9 years: Wexford (2008–2017)

==== Active gaps ====
- Longest active gaps between since last title:
  - 77 years ago: Laois (1949–)
  - 31 years ago: Offaly (1995–)
  - 13 years ago: Dublin (2013–)
  - 8 years ago: Galway (2018–)
  - 7 years ago: Wexford (2019–)
  - 1 year ago: Kilkenny (2025–)
- Longest active gaps since last championship final appearance:
  - 89 years ago: Westmeath (1937–)
  - 41 years ago: Laois (1985–)
  - 22 years ago: Offaly (2004–)
  - 7 years ago: Wexford (2019–)
  - 1 year ago: Kilkenny (2025–)
  - 0 years ago: Dublin (2026–)
  - 0 years ago: Galway (2026–)
- Longest active gap since last championship appearance:
  - 106 years ago: Louth (1920–)

==== Leinster final pairings ====
Pairing	Meetings	First meeting	Last meeting
Dublin v Kilkenny	45	1888	2024
Kilkenny v Wexford	36	1897	2019
Kilkenny v Offaly	12	1926	2000
Galway v Kilkenny	9	2010	2025
Kilkenny v Laois	7	1909	1949
Offaly v Wexford	7	1901	2004
Dublin v Wexford	6	1910	1961
Dublin v Laois	4	1889	1948
Laois v Wexford	3	1890	1951
Dublin v Offaly	3	1924	1990
Dublin v Galway	2	2013	2026
Offaly v Laois	1	1985	
Galway v Wexford	1	2017	
Dublin unopposed	2	1892	1894

==== Longest undefeated run ====
- 15 matches (Kilkenny, 2005–2012): The record for the longest unbeaten run stands at 15 games held by Kilkenny. It began with a 6-28 to 0-15 win against Offaly in the semi-final of the 2005 championship and finished with a 2-21 to 0-9 defeat of Dublin in the Leinster semi-final of the 2012 championship. The 15-game unbeaten streak, which included no drawn games, ended with a 2-21 to 2-11 loss to Galway in the 2012 Leinster final.

==== Miscellaneous ====
- Best finish by a debuting team
  - Champions, Kilkenny (1888)
- Best finish by a debuting team (after 1888)
  - Champions, Wexford (1890)
- Highest winning record in finals (3 or more app.)
  - 71%, Kilkenny (75 wins in 106 matches)
- Lowest winning record in finals (3 or more app.)
  - 20%, Laois (3 wins in 15 matches)
- Most played match
  - Dublin vs Kilkenny

== Players ==
=== Top scorers ===
==== All time ====
This is a list of players who have scored a cumulative total of 100 points or more in the Leinster Championship.

As of the Round1 2023 championship
Pos.	Name	Team	Goals	Points	Total
1	T. J. Reid	Kilkenny	19	303	360
2	Eddie Keher	Kilkenny	28	220	304
3	Joe Canning	Galway	16	242	290
4	Henry Shefflin	Kilkenny	11	220	253
5	Shane Dooley	Offaly	15	155	200
6	Nicky Rackard	Wexford	41	65	188
7	D. J. Carey	Kilkenny	23	98	167
8	Paddy Molloy	Offaly	25	76	151
9	Paul Ryan	Dublin	8	125	149
10	Jim Langton	Kilkenny	14	105	147
11	Tony Doran	Wexford	30	53	143
12	Johnny Dooley	Offaly	3	124	133
13	Ned Buggy	Wexford	11	86	119
14	Mark Corrigan	Offaly	10	83	113
15	Billy Fitzpatrick	Kilkenny	10	81	111
16	Niall O'Brien	Westmeath	3	92	101

==== By year ====
Year	Name	Team	Goals	Points	Total
1948	Nicky Rackard	Wexford	4	3	15
1949	Paddy Lalor	Laois	6	3	21
1950	Nicky Rackard	Wexford	5	7	22
1951	Nicky Rackard	Wexford	5	13	28
1952	Tony Herbert	Dublin	4	3	15
1953	Jim Langton	Kilkenny	1	19	22
1954	Nicky Rackard	Wexford	5	9	24
1955	Seán Clohessy	Kilkenny	5	10	25
1956	Nicky Rackard	Wexford	6	4	22
1957	Tommy Errity	Offaly	4	7	19
1958	Mickey Kelly	Kilkenny	5	7	22
1959	Tommy O'Connell	Kilkenny	4	5	17
1960	Padge Kehoe	Wexford	1	10	13
1961	Mick Bolger	Westmeath	3	6	15
1962	Padge Kehoe	Wexford	2	8	14
1963	Willie Walsh	Carlow	4	4	16
1964	Tony Forrestal	Kilkenny	4	2	14
1965	Paddy Molloy	Offaly	4	12	24
1966	Paddy Molloy	Offaly	4	14	26
1967	Eddie Keher	Kilkenny	3	12	21
1970	Tony Doran	Wexford	4	2	14
1969	Paddy Molloy	Offaly	8	18	42
1970	Ned Buggy	Wexford	1	15	18
1971	Eddie Keher	Kilkenny	2	18	24
1972	Eddie Keher	Kilkenny	4	20	32
1973	Barney Moylan	Offaly	3	18	27
1974	Eddie Keher	Kilkenny	4	11	23
1975	Barney Moylan	Offaly	4	22	34
1976	Johnny Walsh	Kildare	0	16	16
1977	Ned Buggy	Wexford	1	13	16
1978	Ned Buggy	Wexford	1	15	18
1979	Ned Buggy	Wexford	1	16	19
1980	Billy Fitzpatrick	Kilkenny	2	16	22
1981	Pádraig Horan	Offaly	4	5	17
1982	Pádraig Horan	Offaly	5	17	32
1983	John Quigley	Wexford	3	8	17
1983	Billy Fitzpatrick	Kilkenny	1	14	17
1984	Billy Fitzpatrick	Kilkenny	1	11	14
1985	Eugene Fennelly	Laois	0	28	28
1986	Paddy Corrigan	Offaly	0	15	15
1987	Mark Corrigan	Offaly	0	16	16
1988	Jimmy Holohan	Wexford	2	15	21
1989	Adrian Ronan	Kilkenny	1	21	24
1990	Jimmy Holohan	Wexford	0	14	14
1991	Jimmy Holohan	Wexford	1	15	18
1999	D. J. Carey	Kilkenny	2	12	18
1993	Tom Dempsey	Wexford	0	28	28
1994	Éamonn Scallan	Wexford	2	16	22
1995	Billy Byrne	Wexford	4	1	13
1995	Eamon Morrissey	Kilkenny	3	4	13
1995	Denis Byrne	Kilkenny	3	4	13
1995	Seán McLoughlin	Westmeath	3	4	13
1996	Johnny Dooley	Offaly	0	19	24
1997	Johnny Dooley	Offaly	1	21	24
1998	John Troy	Offaly	2	19	25
1999	D. J. Carey	Kilkenny	4	7	19
1999	Henry Shefflin	Kilkenny	1	16	19
2003	Tomás McGrane	Dublin	1	33	36
2001	Nicky Horan	Meath	2	21	27
2001	Tom Carew	Kildare	1	24	27
2002	Nicky Horan	Meath	3	17	26
2003	Tomás McGrane	Dublin	2	22	28
2004	Andrew Mitchell	Westmeath	1	21	24
2005	Henry Shefflin	Kilkenny	2	19	25
2006	Henry Shefflin	Kilkenny	1	15	18
2007	Damien Murray	Offaly	2	20	26
2008	Brian Carroll	Offaly	0	22	22
2009	Alan McCrabbe	Dublin	1	31	34
2010	Shane Dooley	Offaly	2	27	33
2011	Paul Ryan	Dublin	2	30	36
2012	Shane Dooley	Offaly	3	15	24
2012	Joe Canning	Galway	1	21	24
2013	Paul Ryan	Dublin	3	26	35
2014	Paul Shiels	Antrim	1	48	51
2015	Zane Keenan	Laois	0	48	48
2016	Shane Dooley	Offaly	4	39	51
2017	Ross King	Laois	0	41	41
2018	T. J. Reid	Kilkenny	2	56	62
2019	T. J. Reid	Kilkenny	5	54	69

==== Single game ====
Year	Top scorer	Team	Score	Total
1948	Nicky Rackard	Wexford	4-00	12
1949	Paddy Lalor	Laois	3-02	11
1950	Nicky Rackard	Wexford	2-05	11
1951	Paddy Kelly	Laois	3-01	10
1951	Harry Gray	Laois	3-01	10
1951	Harry Gray	Laois	2-04	10
1951	Nicky Rackard	Wexford	2-04	10
1952	Paddy Lalor	Laois	3-02	11
1953	Tim Flood	Wexford	2-06	12
1954	Nicky Rackard	Wexford	5-04	19
1955	Tim Flood	Wexford	3-01	10
1955	Seán Clohessy	Kilkenny	2-04	10
1956	Nicky Rackard	Wexford	4-03	15
1957	Tommy Errity	Offaly	3-03	12
1958	Tim Flood	Wexford	4-01	13
1958	Padge Kehoe	Wexford	4-01	13
1958	Mickey Kelly	Kilkenny	3-04	13
1959	Tommy O'Connell	Kilkenny	3-03	12
1960	Eddie Keher	Kilkenny	1-08	11
1961	Andy Doyle	Wexford	4-02	14
1962	Mick McDonald	Laois	3-01	10
1963	Eddie Keher	Kilkenny	2-05	11
1964	Tom Forrestal	Kilkenny	3-02	11
1965	Paddy Molloy	Offaly	2-07	13
1966	Paddy Molloy	Offaly	3-04	13
1967	Jim Lynch	Kilkenny	4-00	12
1968	Tommy Ring	Westmeath	2-03	9
1969	Paddy Molloy	Offaly	5-04	19
1970	Ned Buggy	Wexford	1-07	10
1971	Eddie Keher	Kilkenny	2-07	13
1972	Eddie Keher	Kilkenny	2-05	11
1972	Eddie Keher	Kilkenny	1-08	11
1973	Tom Byrne	Wexford	2-06	12
1973	George Lanham	Laois	2-06	12
1974	Eddie Keher	Kilkenny	2-06	12
1975	Barney Moylan	Limerick	4-04	16
1976	Johnny Walsh	Kildare	0-12	12
1977	Liam O'Brien	Kilkenny	1-07	10
1977	Michael Cosgrove	Westmeath	1-07	10
1978	Liam O'Brien	Kilkenny	0-11	11
1979	Liam O'Brien	Kilkenny	1-07	10
1979	Ned Buggy	Wexford	0-10	10
1980	Billy Fitzpatrick	Kilkenny	1-11	14
1981	Billy Bohane	Laois	2-03	9
1981	Pádraig Horan	Offaly	2-03	9
1981	Martin Brophy	Laois	0-09	9
1982	Billy Fitzpatrick	Kilkenny	2-07	13
1983	Joe Towell	Dublin	3-03	12
1983	Billy Fitzpatrick	Kilkenny	1-09	12
1984	Billy Bohane	Laois	0-12	12
1985	Paddy Corrigan	Offaly	1-11	14
1986	Liam Fennelly	Kilkenny	3-01	10
1986	Eugene Fennelly	Laois	2-04	10
1987	Christy Heffernan	Kilkenny	2-05	11
1988	Jimmy Holohan	Wexford	1-06	9
1989	Mark Corrigan	Offaly	3-07	16
1990	Jimmy Holohan	Wexford	0-12	12
1991	Jimmy Holohan	Wexford	1-10	13
1992	D. J. Carey	Kilkenny	1-06	9
1993	D. J. Carey	Kilkenny	2-04	10
1994	David Doyle	Carlow	2-06	12
1995	Eamon Morrissey	Kilkenny	3-03	12
1996	Niall English	Carlow	1-09	12
1997	Johnny Dooley	Offaly	1-09	12
1998	John Troy	Offaly	1-09	12
1999	Niall Rigney	Laois	1-08	11
2000	Dave Cuddy	Laois	0-12	12
2001	Nicky Horan	Meath	2-15	21
2002	Nicky Horan	Meath	1-11	14
2003	Tomás McGrane	Dublin	0-13	13
2004	Johnathan O'Neill	Wicklow	1-11	14
2005	Henry Shefflin	Wexford	2-11	17
2006	Henry Shefflin	Wexford	1-07	10
2007	Damien Murray	Offaly	1-12	15
2008	Brian Carroll	Offaly	0-16	16
2009	Joe Canning	Galway	2-09	15
2010	Shane Dooley	Offaly	1-10	13
2010	Shane Dooley	Offaly	0-13	13
2011	Shane Dooley	Offaly	1-13	16
2012	Shane Dooley	Offaly	2-07	13
2012	Niall O'Brien	Westmeath	2-07	13
2012	Joe Canning	Galway	1-10	13
2012	Willie Hyland	Laois	0-13	13
2013	Paul Ryan	Dublin	2-07	13
2014	T. J. Reid	Kilkenny	2-11	17
2015	Joe Canning	Galway	1-15	18
2016	Shane Dooley	Offaly	1-11	14
2017	Shane Dooley	Offaly	3-08	17
2018	Joe Canning	Galway	1-12	15
2019	T. J. Reid	Kilkenny	2-12	18

==== Finals ====
Year	Top scorer	Team	Score	Total
1928	Tom Barry	Dublin	3-01	10
1929	Final was declared void			
1930	Matty Power	Dublin	1-02	5
1930	Steve Hegarty	Dublin	1-02	5
1931	Mick Larkin	Kilkenny	2-02	8
1932	Martin Power	Kilkenny	1-02	5
1932	Dan Dunne	Kilkenny	1-02	5
1933	John Fitzpatrick	Kilkenny	2-00	6
1933	Matty Power	Kilkenny	2-00	6
1933	Jerry Browne	Dublin	2-00	6
1934	Lory Meagher	Kilkenny	1-01	4
1934	Steve Hegarty	Dublin	1-01	4
1934	Tommy Treacy	Dublin	1-01	4
1934	Din O'Neill	Dublin	1-01	4
1935	Locky Byrne	Kilkenny	1-01	4
1936	Martin White	Kilkenny	2-00	6
1937	Martin White	Kilkenny	3-01	10
1938	Robbie Ryan (D)	Dublin	1-01	4
1938	Mossy McDonnell (R)	Dublin	0-07	7
1939	Paddy McSweeney	Dublin	3-00	9
1940	Jim Langton	Kilkenny	1-02	5
1940	Jack Mulcahy	Kilkenny	1-02	5
1941	Mossy McDonnell	Dublin	2-03	9
1942	Mossy McDonnell	Dublin	1-06	9
1943	Jim Langton	Kilkenny	1-05	8
1944	Nicky Rackard	Wexford	2-00	6
1944	Harry Gray	Dublin	1-03	6
1945	Jim Langton	Kilkenny	0-08	8
1946	Tom Walton	Kilkenny	2-00	6
1947	Terry Leahy	Kilkenny	3-03	12
1948	Mickey Williams	Dublin	2-01	7
1949	Shem Downey	Kilkenny	2-01	7
1950	Nicky Rackard	Wexford	2-02	8
1951	Harry Gray	Laois	3-01	10
1952	Ted Kelly	Dublin	3-01	10
1953	Nicky Rackard	Wexford	2-03	9
1954	Nicky Rackard	Wexford	5-04	19
1955	Tim Flood (D)	Wexford	1-03	6
1955	Nicky Rackard (R)	Wexford	3-00	9
1956	Nicky Rackard	Wexford	2-03	9
1957	Seán Clohessy	Kilkenny	2-01	7
1958	Padge Kehoe	Wexford	4-01	13
1958	Mickey Kelly	Kilkenny	3-04	13
1959	Des Foley	Dublin	1-06	9
1960	Eddie Keher	Kilkenny	1-08	11
1961	Paddy Croke	Dublin	3-00	9
1962	Ned Wheeler	Wexford	1-02	5
1962	Padge Kehoe	Wexford	0-05	5
1963	Eddie Keher	Kilkenny	0-05	5
1963	Mick Bermingham	Dublin	0-05	5
1964	John Teehan	Kilkenny	1-02	5
1964	Tom Murphy	Kilkenny	1-02	5
1964	Denis Heaslip	Kilkenny	1-02	5
1964	Mick Bermingham	Dublin	1-02	5
1965	Martin Byrne	Wexford	2-01	7
1966	Eddie Keher	Kilkenny	0-06	6
1967	Eddie Keher	Kilkenny	2-05	11
1968	John Teehan	Kilkenny	2-01	7
1969	Pat Delaney	Kilkenny	3-00	9
1970	Ned Buggy	Wexford	0-08	8
1971	Eddie Keher	Kilkenny	0-11	11
1972	Eddie Keher (D)	Kilkenny	2-05	11
1972	Eddie Keher (R)	Kilkenny	1-08	11
1973	Tom Byrne	Wexford	2-06	12
1974	Eddie Keher	Kilkenny	2-06	12
1975	Eddie Keher	Kilkenny	1-08	11
1976	Mick Butler	Wexford	0-08	8
1977	Ned Buggy	Wexford	1-05	8
1978	Ned Buggy	Wexford	1-07	10
1980	Matt Ruth	Kilkenny	3-01	10
1981	Pádraig Horan	Offaly	2-03	9
1982	Billy Fitzpatrick	Kilkenny	0-05	5
1983	Christy Heffernan	Kilkenny	1-02	5
1983	Billy Fitzpatrick	Kilkenny	0-05	5
1983	Pádraig Horan	Offaly	0-05	5
1984	Pádraig Horan	Offaly	1-01	4
1984	Billy Byrne	Wexford	1-01	4
1985	Mark Corrigan	Offaly	1-05	8
1986	Liam Fennelly	Kilkenny	3-01	10
1987	Ger Fennelly	Kilkenny	0-09	9
1988	Jimmy Holohan	Wexford	1-06	9
1989	Mark Corrigan	Offaly	3-07	16
1990	Mark Corrigan	Offaly	1-03	6
1991	Adrian Ronan	Kilkenny	1-03	6
1992	D. J. Carey	Kilkenny	1-06	9
1993	Eamon Morrissey (D)	Kilkenny	2-03	9
1993	Tom Demspey (D)	Wexford	0-09	9
1993	D. J. Carey (R)	Kilkenny	1-05	8
1994	Johnny Dooley	Offaly	0-09	9
1995	D. J. Carey	Kilkenny	2-00	6
1996	Tom Demspey	Wexford	1-05	8
1997	Billy Byrne	Wexford	1-02	5
1998	John Troy	Offaly	1-06	9
1999	D. J. Carey	Kilkenny	2-04	10
2000	Charlie Carter	Kilkenny	1-04	7
2001	Charlie Carter	Kilkenny	0-07	7
2002	Paul Codd	Wexford	0-13	13
2003	Henry Shefflin	Kilkenny	1-08	11
2004	Paul Carley	Wexford	1-01	4
2004	Damien Murray	Offaly	0-04	4
2005	Henry Shefflin	Kilkenny	0-08	8
2006	Henry Shefflin	Kilkenny	1-07	10
2007	Willie O'Dwyer	Kilkenny	2-03	9
2007	Henry Shefflin	Kilkenny	0-09	9
2008	Henry Shefflin	Kilkenny	1-07	10
2009	Alan McCrabbe	Dublin	0-12	12
2010	Henry Shefflin	Kilkenny	1-07	10
2011	Paul Ryan	Dublin	1-09	12
2011	Henry Shefflin	Kilkenny	1-09	12
2012	Joe Canning	Galway	1-10	13
2013	Paul Ryan	Dublin	2-07	13
2014	T. J. Reid	Kilkenny	0-10	10
2015	T. J. Reid	Kilkenny	1-09	12
2016	T. J. Reid	Kilkenny	0-10	10
2017	Joe Canning	Galway	0-10	10
2018	T. J. Reid (D)	Kilkenny	0-10	10
2018	Joe Canning (R)	Galway	0-10	10
2019	T. J. Reid	Kilkenny	0-12	12

=== All-time appearances ===
Rank	Player	Team	Appearances	Era
1	T. J. Reid	Kilkenny	44	2007-2023
2	Eddie Keher	Kilkenny	37	1960-1977
3	Henry Shefflin	Kilkenny	30	1999-2014

=== Leinster final appearances ===
Rank	Player	Team	Appearances	Finals
1	Eddie Keher	Kilkenny	18	1960, 1962, 1963, 1964, 1965, 1966, 1967, 1968, 1969, 1970, 1971, 1972, 1972 (R), 1973, 1974, 1975, 1976, 1977
2	Matty Power	Kilkenny; Dublin	17	1920, 1921, 1922, 1923, 1925, 1927, 1928, 1929, 1930, 1931, 1932, 1933, 1934, 1934 (R), 1935, 1936, 1937
3	T. J. Reid	Kilkenny	18	2007, 2008, 2009, 2010, 2011, 2012, 2014, 2015, 2016, 2018, 2018 (R), 2019, 2020, 2021, 2022, 2023, 2024, 2025
3	Paddy Larkin	Kilkenny	15	1931, 1932, 1933, 1934, 1934 (R), 1935, 1936, 1937, 1938, 1938 (R), 1939, 1940, 1941, 1942, 1943
3	Frank Cummins	Kilkenny	15	1968, 1970, 1971, 1972, 1972 (R), 1973, 1974, 1975, 1976, 1977, 1978, 1979, 1980, 1982, 1983
5	Noel Skehan	Kilkenny	14	1968, 1970, 1972, 1972 (R), 1973, 1974, 1975, 1976, 1977, 1978, 1979, 1980, 1982, 1983
5	Henry Shefflin	Kilkenny	14	1999, 2000, 2001, 2002, 2003, 2005, 2006, 2007, 2008, 2009, 2010, 2011, 2012, 2014
7	Tony Doran	Wexford	13	1967, 1968, 1970, 1971, 1973, 1974, 1975, 1976, 1977, 1978, 1979, 1981, 1984
7	D. J. Carey	Kilkenny	13	1991, 1992, 1993, 1993 (R), 1995, 1997, 1998, 1999, 2000, 2001, 2002, 2003, 2005
9	Sim Walton	Kilkenny	12	1902, 1903, 1904, 1905, 1907, 1909, 1911, 1912, 1913, 1916, 1917, 1919
9	Lory Meagher	Kilkenny	12	1925, 1926, 1927, 1929, 1931, 1932, 1933, 1934, 1934 (R), 1935, 1936, 1937
9	Phil Larkin	Kilkenny	12	1963, 1964, 1971, 1972, 1972 (R), 1973, 1974, 1975, 1976, 1977, 1978, 1979

== See also ==
- All-Ireland Senior Hurling Championship records and statistics
- Munster Senior Hurling Championship records and statistics
