= Galway–Kilkenny hurling rivalry =

Galway-Kilkenny
- Location: County Galway; County Kilkenny
- Teams: Galway; Kilkenny
- First meeting: Kilk. 3-4 - 0-4 Galway; 1897 All-Ireland semi-final (30 October 1898)
- Latest meeting: Galway 2-23 - 0-29 Kilk. 2024 Leinster Senior Hurling Championship (28 April 2024)
- Next meeting: TBD

Statistics
- Total meetings: 51
- Most player appearances: Henry Shefflin (12)
- Top scorer: Henry Shefflin (5-101)
- All-time series: Championship: Galway 13-33 Kilkenny (5 draws)
- Largest victory: Kilkenny 5-28 - 3-7 Galway; 1972 All-Ireland semi-final (6 August 1972)

The Galway-Kilkenny rivalry is a hurling rivalry between Irish county teams Galway and Kilkenny, who first played each other in 1898. Recently it has become one of the biggest rivalries in Gaelic games. Kilkenny's home ground is Nowlan Park and Galway's home ground is Pearse Stadium, however, all of their championship meetings have been held at neutral venues.

While Kilkenny have the highest number of All-Ireland and Leinster titles, Galway were the standard bearers in Connacht before joining the Leinster championship in 2009, however, All-Ireland success for them has been sporadic. Between them the two teams have won 41 All-Ireland championships.

== History ==
While Kilkenny is classed as one of the "Big Three", Galway is considered an in-between county, meaning it has some good years and some bad years. Galway have always had the capability to stop the Kilkenny forces.

== Statistics ==
Up to date as of 2023 season

Team	All-Ireland	Provincial	National League	Total
Kilkenny	36	75	19	130
Galway	5	28	11	44
Combined	41	103	30	174

== Notable Matches ==
- Galway 5-18 : 4-18 Kilkenny (August 2005 Croke Park) - Lauded as the greatest game of the modern era, Galway went in as underdogs but managed to stun the hurling world by enialating Kilkenny in the opening 30 minutes leading 2-11:1-04 after 30 minutes. Kilkenny came back into it and trailed only by 2 points at the break 2-11:3-05. But 3 second-half goals by Niall Healy helped Galway to stay in front and bring them to a shocking win by 5-18:4-18.
- Kilkenny 1-19 : 1-12 Galway (July 2010 at Croke Park) - Galways first Leinster final pitted them against the mighty Kilkenny who were going for an infamous 5-In-A-Row All Irelands. Despite a strong start with Galway jumping to a 1-03:0-00 lead, Kilkenny soon got to grips and rallied to lead 0-14:1-05 at half time. Galway were unlucky not to win the second half (K 1-05:0-07 G), but never gave up and battled until the end.
- Galway 2-21 : 2-11 Kilkenny (July 2012 at Croke Park) - Kilkenny had become the Kings of hurling and were seen as unbeatable, that is until Anthony Cunninghams men took them on in the Leinster Final of 2012. Galway held Kilkeeny scoreless for 20 minutes and led at half time by 2-12:0-04. Kilkenny fought back in the second half, but it was never going to be enough as Galway finished strongly to win their first Leinster title by 2-21:2-11.
- Kilkenny 0-19 : 2-13 Galway (September 2012 at Croke Park) - The sides second meeting in the 2012 Trilogy was the All-Ireland final. Again Galway jumped into a lead 1-04:0-02 and held on to lead by 5 at the break 1-09:0-07, but sloppy defending meant they conceded 10 second half frees all converted by Henry Shefflin. Galway finished with a last-gasp free from Joe Canning to force a replay, final score Galway 2-13, Kilkenny 0-19.
- Kilkenny 3-22: 3-11 Galway (September 2012 #2 at Croke Park) - For the third match in 2012 Galway jumped into a 2-02:0-02 lead but that was the last we heard of Galway until the dying moments as Kilkenny dominated the rest of the match scoring 3-22 to win by eleven points.
- Galway 5-16 : 3-22 Kilkenny (June 2014 at O'Connor Park) - Galway came back from 10 points down with six minutes to play to force a draw. Joe Canning scored the last point of the game with the last play from out on the left near the touch-line to level the game after Henry Shefflin appeared to have won it for Kilkenny with a similar point at the other end. Kilkenny went on to win the replay the week after.

== Recent results ==
=== Legend ===
Galway win
Kilkenny win
Drawn match

=== Senior championship ===
No.	Date	Winners	Score	Runners-up	Venue	Stage
1.	30 October 1898	Kilkenny (1)	3-4 - 0-4	Galway	Athlone	All-Ireland semi-final
2.	13 May 1906	Kilkenny (2)	2-8 - 1-7	Galway	Athlone	All-Ireland semi-final
3.	29 September 1912	Kilkenny (3)	8-3 - 2-2	Galway	Jones's Road	All-Ireland semi-final
4.	18 May 1924	Galway (1)	5-4 - 2-0	Kilkenny	Croke Park	All-Ireland semi-final
5.	9 August 1925	Galway (2)	9-4 - 6-0	Kilkenny	Croke Park	All-Ireland semi-final
6.	29 August 1926	Kilkenny (4)	6-2 - 5-1	Galway	Croke Park	All-Ireland semi-final
7.	11 August 1929	Galway (3)	7-7 - 7-1	Kilkenny	St. Brendan's Park	All-Ireland semi-final
8.	16 August 1931	Kilkenny (5)	7-2 - 3-1	Galway	Croke Park	All-Ireland semi-final
9.	13 August 1933	Kilkenny (5)	5-10 - 3-8	Galway	St. Brendan's Park	All-Ireland semi-final
10.	4 August 1935	Kilkenny (6)	6-10 - 1-8	Galway	St. Brendan's Park	All-Ireland semi-final
11.	8 August 1937	Kilkenny (7)	0-8 - 0-6	Galway	St. Brendan's Park	All-Ireland semi-final
12.	6 August 1939	Kilkenny (8)	1-16 - 3-1	Galway	St. Cronan's Park	All-Ireland semi-final
13.	29 July 1945	Kilkenny (9)	5-3 - 2-11	Galway	St. Brendan's Park	All-Ireland semi-final
14.	27 July 1947	Kilkenny (10)	2-9 - 1-11	Galway	St. Brendan's Park	All-Ireland semi-final
15.	16 August 1953	Galway (4)	3-5 - 1-10	Kilkenny	Croke Park	All-Ireland semi-final
16.	6 August 1972	Kilkenny (11)	5-28 - 3-7	Galway	Croke Park	All-Ireland semi-final
17.	4 August 1974	Kilkenny (13)	2-32 - 3-17	Galway	St. Brendan's Park	All-Ireland semi-final
18.	7 September 1975	Kilkenny (14)	2-22 - 2-10	Galway	Croke Park	All-Ireland final
19.	6 August 1978	Kilkenny (15)	4-20 - 4-13	Galway	Croke Park	All-Ireland semi-final
20.	2 September 1979	Kilkenny (16)	2-12 - 1-8	Galway	Croke Park	All-Ireland final
21.	8 August 1982	Kilkenny (17)	2-20 - 2-10	Galway	Croke Park	All-Ireland semi-final
22.	10 August 1986	Galway (5)	4-12 - 0-13	Kilkenny	Semple Stadium	All-Ireland semi-final
23.	6 September 1987	Galway (6)	1-12 - 0-9	Kilkenny	Croke Park	All-Ireland final
24.	9 August 1992	Kilkenny (18)	2-13 - 1-12	Galway	Croke Park	All-Ireland semi-final
25.	5 September 1993	Kilkenny (19)	2-17 - 1-15	Galway	Croke Park	All-Ireland final
26.	27 July 1997	Kilkenny (20)	4-15 - 3-16	Galway	Semple Stadium	All-Ireland quarter-final
27.	13 August 2000	Kilkenny (21)	2-19 - 0-17	Galway	Croke Park	All-Ireland semi-final
28.	19 August 2001	Galway (7)	2-15 - 1-13	Kilkenny	Croke Park	All-Ireland semi-final
29.	10 July 2004	Kilkenny (22)	4-20 - 1-10	Galway	Semple Stadium	All-Ireland qualifier
30.	21 August 2005	Galway (8)	5-18 - 4-18	Kilkenny	Croke Park	All-Ireland semi-final
31.	22 July 2006	Kilkenny (23)	2-22 - 3-14	Galway	Semple Stadium	All-Ireland quarter-final
32.	28 July 2007	Kilkenny (24)	3-22 - 1-18	Galway	Croke Park	All-Ireland quarter-final
33.	20 June 2009	Kilkenny (25)	2-20 - 3-13	Galway	O'Connor Park	Leinster semi-final
34.	4 July 2010	Kilkenny (26)	1-19 - 1-12	Galway	Croke Park	Leinster final
35.	8 July 2012	Galway (9)	2-21 - 2-11	Kilkenny	Croke Park	Leinster final
36.	9 September 2012	Galway	2-13 - 0-19	Kilkenny	Croke Park	All-Ireland final
37.	30 September 2012	Kilkenny (27)	3-22 - 3-11	Galway	Croke Park	All-Ireland final replay
38.	22 June 2014	Kilkenny	3-22 - 5-16	Galway	O'Connor Park	Leinster semi-final
39.	28 June 2014	Kilkenny (28)	3-19 - 1-17	Galway	O'Connor Park	Leinster semi-final replay
40.	5 July 2015	Kilkenny (29)	1-25 - 2-15	Galway	Croke Park	Leinster final
41.	6 September 2015	Kilkenny (30)	1-22 - 1-18	Galway	Croke Park	All-Ireland final
42.	3 July 2016	Kilkenny (31)	1-26 - 0-22	Galway	Croke Park	Leinster final
43.	27 May 2018	Galway (10)	1-22 - 2-11	Kilkenny	Salthill	Leinster Round Robin
44.	1 July 2018	Galway	0-18 - 0-18	Kilkenny	Croke Park	Leinster final
45.	8 July 2018	Galway (11)	1-28 - 3-15	Kilkenny	Croke Park	Leinster final replay
46.	9 June 2019	Galway (12)	2-22 - 3-20	Kilkenny	Nowlan Park	Leinster Round Robin
47.	14 November 2020	Kilkenny (32)	2-20 - 0-24	Galway	Croke Park	Leinster Final
48.	1 May 2022	Galway (13)	1-24 - 3-17	Kilkenny	Pearse Stadium	Leinster Round Robin
49.	30 April 2023	Kilkenny	0-28 - 1-25	Galway	Nowlan Park	Leinster Round Robin
50.	11 June 2023	Kilkenny (33)	4-21 - 2-26	Galway	Croke Park	Leinster Final
51.	28 April 2024	Galway	2-23 - 0-29	Kilkenny	Pearse Stadium	Leinster Round Robin

=== National League ===
No.	Date	Winners	Score	Runners-up	Venue	Stage
	28 March 2010	Galway	2-21 - 1-23	Kilkenny	Nowlan Park	Round 5
	13 March 2011	Galway	4-14 - 3-11	Kilkenny	Pearse Stadium	Round 4
	1 April 2012	Kilkenny	3-26 - 0-10	Galway	Nowlan Park	Round 5
	24 February 2013	Galway	3-11 - 0-17	Kilkenny	Pearse Stadium	Round 1
	21 April 2013	Kilkenny	1-24 - 1-17	Galway	Semple Stadium	League semi-final
	9 March 2014	Kilkenny	2-16 - 1-16	Galway	Nowlan Park	Round 3
	20 April 2014	Kilkenny	1-16 - 0-15	Galway	Gaelic Grounds	League semi-final
	8 March 2015	Galway	0-20 - 0-18	Kilkenny	Pearse Stadium	Round 3
	6 March 2016	Kilkenny	0-21 - 1-14	Kilkenny	Nowlan Park	Round 3

== Records ==
=== Scorelines ===
- Biggest championship win:
  - For Galway:
    - Galway 5-4 - 2-0 Kilkenny, All-Ireland semi-final, Croke Park, 18 May 1924
    - Galway 9-4 - 6-0 Kilkenny, All-Ireland semi-final, Croke Park, 9 August 1925
  - For Kilkenny: Kilkenny 5-28 - 3-7 Galway, All-Ireland semi-final, Croke Park, 6 August 1972
- Highest aggregate:
  - Kilkenny 2-32 - 3-17 Galway, All-Ireland semi-final, St. Brendan's Park, 4 August 1974

=== Top scorers ===
Team	Player	Score	Total
Galway	Joe Canning	6-56	74
Kilkenny	Henry Shefflin	5-110	125

- Top scorer in a single game:
  - For Kilkenny:
    - 2-11 - Henry Shefflin, Kilkenny 4-20 - 1-10 Galway, All-Ireland qualifier, Semple Stadium, 11 July 2004
    - 0-17 - Eddie Keher, Kilkenny 5-28 - 3-7 Galway, All-Ireland semi-final, Croke Park, 6 August 1972
  - For Galway:
    - 2-9 - Ger Farragher, Galway 5-18 - 4-18 Kilkenny, All-Ireland semi-final, Croke Park, 21 August 2005
    - 2-9 - Joe Canning, Galway 3-13 - 2-20 Kilkenny, Leinster semi-final, O'Connor Park, 20 June 2009
