= Paddy Buskin =

Irish hurler (1873–1961)

Personal information
- Native name: Pádraig Ó Baiscinn (Irish)
- Born: 2 October 1873 Croom, County Limerick, Ireland
- Died: 21 December 1961 (aged 88) Croom, County Limerick, Ireland
- Occupation: Farmer

Sport
- Sport: Hurling
- Position: Right point
Club
- Years: Club
- Croom
Club titles
- Limerick titles: 1
Inter-county
- Years: County
- 1897–1899: Limerick
Inter-county titles
- Munster titles: 1
- All-Irelands: 1

Patrick Buskin (2 October 1873 – 21 December 1961) was an Irish hurler. He played with Croom at club level and was part of the Limerick team that won the 1897 All-Ireland SHC title.

== Career ==
Born and raised in Croom, County Limerick, Buskin first played hurling with Croom Hurling Club in the early years of the Gaelic Athletic Association. He was part of the Croom team that won the club's inaugural Limerick SHC title in 1908, following a 2–06 to 0–04 win over Caherline in the final.

Kilfinane were the Limerick representatives at inter-county level in 1897, and Buskin was one of a number of players invited to supplement the team. He won a Munster SHC medal that year, following a 4–09 to 1–06 win over Cork. He was again part of the Limerick team that subsequently had a one-goal win over Kilkenny in the 1897 All-Ireland SHC final. Buskin won a Croke Cup title in July 1899, following another victory over Kilkenny.

== Death ==
Buskin died on 21 December 1961, at the age of 88.

== Honours ==
Croom

- Limerick Senior Hurling Championship (1): 1908

Limerick

- All-Ireland Senior Hurling Championship (1): 1897
- Munster Senior Hurling Championship (1): 1897
- Croke Cup (1): 1897
