= Tom Brazill =

Irish hurler (1879–1946)

Personal information
- Native name: Tomás Ó Breasail (Irish)
- Nickname: Goatee
- Born: 1879 Kilfinane, County Limerick, Ireland
- Died: 7 April 1946 (aged 66–67) Kilfinane, County Limerick, Ireland
- Occupation: Labourer

Sport
- Sport: Hurling
- Position: Centre-forward
Club
- Years: Club
- Kilfinane
Club titles
- Limerick titles: 2
Inter-county
- Years: County
- Limerick
Inter-county titles
- Munster titles: 1
- All-Irelands: 1

Tom "Goatee" Brazill (1879 – 7 April 1946) was an Irish hurler who played as a left wing-forward for the Limerick senior team.

Born in Kilfinane, County Limerick, Brazill first played competitive hurling in his youth. He was a regular for the Limerick senior hurling team during a successful period at the end of the 19th century. During his inter-county career, he won one All-Ireland medal and one Munster medal.

At club level, Brazill was a two-time championship medallist with Kilfinane.

== Honours ==
=== Player ===
Limerick

- All-Ireland Senior Hurling Championship (1): 1897
- Munster Senior Hurling Championship (1): 1897
