= 2021 Leinster Senior Hurling Championship =

2021 hurling championship

Leinster Senior Hurling Championship
Tournament details
- Province: Leinster
- Year: 2021
- Trophy: Bob O'Keeffe Cup
- Date: 26 June – 17 July 2021
- Teams: 6
- Defending champions: Kilkenny

Winners
- Champions: Kilkenny (73rd win)
- Manager: Brian Cody
- Captain: Adrian Mullen
- Qualify for: Leinster SHC Final; All-Ireland SHC

Runners-up
- Runners-up: Dublin

Promotion/Relegation
- Promoted team(s): Westmeath
- Relegated team(s): Antrim

Other
- Matches played: 5
- Website: Leinster GAA

The 2021 Leinster Senior Hurling Championship was the 2021 installment of the annual Leinster Senior Hurling Championship organised by Leinster GAA. Kilkenny were the defending champions and eventual champions, defeating Dublin in the final.

== Teams ==
The Leinster championship was contested by four counties from the Irish province of Leinster, as well as one county from the province of Connacht and one county from the province of Ulster where the sport is only capable of supporting one county team at this level.

Team	Stadium	Location	Capacity
Antrim	Corrigan Park	Belfast	2,100
—	Croke Park	Jones' Road	82,300
Dublin	Parnell Park	Donnycarney	8,500
Galway	Pearse Stadium	Salthill	26,197
Kilkenny	UPMC Nowlan Park	O'Loughlin Road	27,000
Laois	O'Moore Park	Portlaoise	22,000
Wexford	Innovate Wexford Park	Clonard Road	18,000

== Personnel and general information ==
Team	Colours	Manager	Captain	Vice-captain	Sponsor	Most recent success		
Team	Colours	Manager	Captain	Vice-captain	Sponsor	All-Ireland	Provincial	League
Antrim		Darren Gleeson						
Dublin		Mattie Kenny	Danny Sutcliffe		AIG	1938	2013	2011
Galway		Shane O'Neill	Pádraic Mannion	Conor Whelan	Supermacs	2017	2018	2017
Kilkenny		Brian Cody	Adrian Mullen	Joey Holden	Glanbia	2015	2020	2018
Laois		Eddie Brennan	Enda Rowland	Willie Dunphy	MW Hire Group	1915	1949	
Wexford		Davy Fitzgerald			Gain	1996	2019	1972-73

=== Bracket ===
Quarter-finals
Dublin	3-31
Antrim	0-22
Wexford	5-31
Laois	1-23

Semi-finals
Dublin	1-18
Galway	1-14
Kilkenny	2-37
Wexford	2-29

Final
Dublin	0-19
Kilkenny	1-25

== Fixtures ==
=== Quarter-finals ===
26 June 2021 Quarter-final	Dublin	3-31 – 0-22	Antrim	Navan
				Venue: Páirc Tailteann
		Report

26 June 2021 Quarter-final	Wexford	5-31 – 1-23	Laois	Kilkenny
				Venue: Nowlan Park
		Report

=== Semi-finals ===
3 July 2021 Semi-final	Dublin	1–18 (21) – (17) 1–14	Galway	Dublin
14:00 IST (UTC+1)				Venue: Croke Park
	Gls: C Crummey 1 Pts: D Burke 6 (4f), D Sutcliffe 3, D Gray 2, R Hayes 2, A Nolan 1 (f), C Burke 1, R McBride 1, C Boland 1, C O’Sullivan 1.	Report	Gls: C Whelan 1 Pts: J Canning 6 (4f, 1 ’65), C Whelan 2, E Niland 2 (1f), P Mannion 1, C Mannion 1, C Cooney 1, A Harte 1.	Referee: J Murphy (Limerick)

3 July 2021 Semi-final	Kilkenny	2–37 (43) – (35) 2–29 (aet)	Wexford	Dublin
16:30 IST (UTC+1)		(HT: 0–15 – 0–14) (FT: 1–27 – 1–27)		Venue: Croke Park
	Gls: E Cody 1, W Walsh 1. Pts: TJ Reid 16 (11fs, 1 ‘65); E Cody 5, R Reid 2, J Maher 2, J Bergin 2, E Murphy 1 (f), T Walsh 1, W Walsh 1, C Fogarty 1, A Mullen 1, J Donnelly 1, M Keoghan 1, A Murphy 1, B Ryan 1, M Carey 1.	Report	Gls: M Fanning 1 (pen), D Dunne 1. Pts: L Chin 14 (12fs), R O’Connor 3, L Óg McGovern 2, S Murphy 2, C McDonald 2, M O’Hanlon 1, D O’Keeffe 1, P Morris 1 (f), J O’Connor 1, L Ryan 1, M Fanning 1 (f).	Referee: F Horgan (Tipperary)

=== Relegation playoff ===
10 July 2021 Playoff	Antrim	2-21 - 2-27	Laois	Parnell Park
		Report		Referee: Sean Cleere (Kilkenny)

=== Final ===
17 July 2021 Final	Dublin	0–19 (19) – (28) 1–25	Kilkenny	Dublin
19:30 IST (UTC+1)		(HT: 0–9 – 0–12)		Venue: Croke Park
		Report		Referee: Johnny Murphy (Limerick)
