= 1899 Limerick Senior Hurling Championship =

Annual hurling competition season

- Champions: Kilfinane (2nd title); Denis Grimes (captain)
- Runners-up: Lough Gur

The 1899 Limerick Senior Hurling Championship was the 11th staging of the Limerick Senior Hurling Championship since its establishment by the Limerick County Board in 1887.

Shamrocks were the defending champions.

Kilfinane won the championship after a 2–09 to 0–00 defeat of Lough Gur in the final. It was their second championship title overall and their first title in two year.

== Results ==
=== Final ===
Final	Kilfinane	2–09 – 0–00	Lough Gur
