= Denis Grimes =

Irish hurler (1864–1920)

Personal information
- Native name: Donnchadha Ó Greacháin (Irish)
- Born: 7 August 1864 Kilfinane, County Limerick, Ireland
- Died: 1920 (aged 55–56) Wales
- Occupation: Coalminer

Sport
- Sport: Hurling
- Position: Centre-back
Club
- Years: Club
- Kilfinane
Inter-county
- Years: County
- 1897–1899: Limerick
Inter-county titles
- Munster titles: 1
- All-Irelands: 1

Denis Grimes (7 August 1864 – 1920) was an Irish hurler. He played with Kilfinane at club level and was the captain of the Limerick team that won the 1897 All-Ireland SHC title.

== Career ==
Born and raised in Kilfinane, County Limerick, Grimes first played hurling with Kilfinane Hurling Club in the early years of the Gaelic Athletic Association. He captained the team to Limerick SHC title wins in 1897 and 1899.

Kilfinane were the Limerick representatives at inter-county level following each of those title wins. Grimes captained Limerick to the Munster SHC title, following a 4–09 to 1–06 win over Cork. Limerick subsequently had a one-goal win over Kilkenny in the 1897 All-Ireland SHC final. Grimes also won a Croke Cup title in July 1899, when he again captained Limerick to victory over Kilkenny.

== Personal life and death ==
Grimes received a limited education at the local national school and later worked as a labourer. He moved to Wales around the turn of the 20th century and worked in the coalmines. He never returned to Ireland.

Grimes died in 1920.

== Honours ==
Kilfinane

- Limerick Senior Hurling Championship (2): 1897 (c), 1899 (c)

Limerick

- All-Ireland Senior Hurling Championship (1): 1897 (c)
- Munster Senior Hurling Championship (1): 1897 (c)
- Croke Cup (1): 1897 (c)

Sporting positions
Preceded by	Limerick senior hurling team captain 1897	Succeeded by
Achievements
Preceded by Mikey Maher	All-Ireland SHC final winning captain 1897	Succeeded by Mikey Maher
