= 1898 Limerick Senior Hurling Championship =

Annual hurling competition season

- Champions: Shamrocks (1st title)
- Runners-up: Caherline

The 1898 Limerick Senior Hurling Championship was the 10th staging of the Limerick Senior Hurling Championship since its establishment by the Limerick County Board in 1887.

Kilfinane were the defending champions.

Shamrocks won the championship after a 1–06 to 1–02 defeat of Caherline in the final. It was their only championship title.

== Results ==
=== Final ===
Final	Shamrocks	1–06 – 1–02	Caherline
