= 2020 Leinster Senior Hurling Championship =

Hurling competition in Ireland

Leinster Senior Hurling Championship
Tournament details
- Year: 2020
- Teams: 5
- Defending champions: Wexford

Winners
- Champions: Kilkenny (72nd win)
- Manager: Brian Cody
- Qualify for: Leinster SHC Final; All-Ireland SHC

Runners-up
- Runners-up: Galway

Promotion/Relegation
- Promoted team(s): Antrim

Other
- Matches played: 11

The 2020 Leinster Senior Hurling Championship is the 2020 installment of the annual Leinster Senior Hurling Championship organised by Leinster GAA. Wexford were the defending champions. Originally scheduled to be a round robin competition, due to the suspension caused by the impact of the COVID-19 pandemic on Gaelic games, the provincial competition was switched to a knockout format.

== Teams ==
Pearse Stadium

The Leinster championship was contested by four counties from the Irish province of Leinster, as well as one county from the Irish province of Connacht, where the sport is only capable of supporting one county team at this level.

Team	Stadium	Location	Capacity
—N/a	Croke Park	Jones' Road	82,300
Dublin	Parnell Park	Donnycarney	8,500
Galway	Pearse Stadium	Salthill	26,197
Kilkenny	UPMC Nowlan Park	O'Loughlin Road	27,000
Laois	O'Moore Park	Portlaoise	22,000
Wexford	Innovate Wexford Park	Clonard Road	18,000

== Personnel and general information ==
Team	Colours	Manager	Captain	Vice-captain	Sponsor	Most recent success		
Team	Colours	Manager	Captain	Vice-captain	Sponsor	All-Ireland	Provincial	League
Dublin		Mattie Kenny	Danny Sutcliffe		AIG	1938	2013	2011
Galway		Shane O'Neill	Pádraic Mannion	Conor Whelan	Supermacs	2017	2018	2017
Kilkenny		Brian Cody	Colin Fennelly	Joey Holden	Glanbia	2015	2016	2016
Laois		Eddie Brennan	Enda Rowland	Willie Dunphy	MW Hire Group	1915	1949	
Wexford		Davy Fitzgerald			Gain	1996	2019	1972-73

=== Bracket ===
Quarter-finals
Dublin	2-31
Laois	0-23

Semi-finals
Dublin	2-22
Kilkenny	3-20
Galway	1-27
Wexford	0-17

Final
Kilkenny	2-20
Galway	0-24

== Final ==
RTÉ

14 November 2020
18:15
Final

Report

Kilkenny	2-20 (26) – (24) 0-24	Galway
(HT: 0-12 - 0-13)
Gls: TJ Reid 1, R Hogan 1. Pts: TJ Reid 10 (9fs); R Hogan 2, C Browne 2, M Keogan 2, J Donnelly 1, E Cody 1, P Walsh 1, L Blanchfield 1.		Pts: J Canning 14 (9fs, 1 sideline, 1 65), C Whelan 2, J Coen 2, David Burke 2, C Mannion 1, J Cooney 1, B Concannon 1, J Flynn 1.

Croke Park, Dublin
Referee: F Horgan (Tipperary)

== See also ==
- 2020 All-Ireland Senior Hurling Championship
  - 2020 Munster Senior Hurling Championship
  - 2020 Joe McDonagh Cup
