= 2020 Leinster Senior Hurling Championship final =

2020 Leinster Senior Hurling final
- Event: 2020 Leinster Senior Hurling Championship
Galway	Kilkenny
0-24	2-20
- Date: 14 November 2020
- Venue: Croke Park, Dublin
- Man of the Match: Pádraig Walsh
- Referee: Fergal Horgan (Tipperary)
- Attendance: 0
- Weather: Dry

The 2020 Leinster Senior Hurling Championship final, the deciding game of the 2020 Leinster Senior Hurling Championship, was a hurling match that was played on 14 November 2020 at Croke Park, Dublin. It was contested by Kilkenny and Galway.

Kilkenny captained by Colin Fennelly won the game by 2-20 to 0-24 to win their first Leinster title since 2016 and 72nd overall.

== Details ==
14 November 2020 Final	Kilkenny	2-20 (26) – (24) 0-24	Galway	Dublin
18:15		(HT: 0-12 - 0-13)		Venue: Croke Park
	Gls: TJ Reid 1, R Hogan 1. Pts: TJ Reid 10 (9fs); R Hogan 2, C Browne 2, M Keogan 2, J Donnelly 1, E Cody 1, P Walsh 1, L Blanchfield 1.	Report	Pts: J Canning 14 (9fs, 1 sideline, 1 65), C Whelan 2, J Coen 2, David Burke 2, C Mannion 1, J Cooney 1, B Concannon 1, J Flynn 1.	Referee: F Horgan (Tipperary); TV: RTÉ
