= 1897 Limerick Senior Hurling Championship =

Annual hurling competition season

- Champions: Kilfinane (1st title); Denis Grimes (captain)
- Runners-up: Cappamore

The 1897 Limerick Senior Hurling Championship was the ninth staging of the Limerick Senior Hurling Championship since its establishment by the Limerick County Board in 1887.

Caherline were the defending champions.

The final was played on 1 May 1897 at the Markets Field in Limerick, between Kilfinane and Cappamore, in what was their first ever meeting in the final. Kilfinane won the match by 4–09 to 4–08 to claim their first ever championship title.

== Results ==
=== Final ===
1 May 1898 Final	Kilfinane	4–09 – 4–08	Cappamore	Markets Field
