= 2024 Leinster Senior Hurling Championship =

2022 hurling championship

Leinster Senior Hurling Championship
Tournament details
- Province: Leinster
- Year: 2024
- Trophy: Bob O'Keeffe Cup
- Date: 21 April – 8 June 2024
- Teams: 6
- Defending champions: Kilkenny

Winners
- Champions: Kilkenny (76th win)
- Manager: Derek Lyng
- Qualify for: All-Ireland SHC

Runners-up
- Runners-up: Dublin

Other
- Matches played: 16
- Website: Leinster GAA

The 2024 Leinster Senior Hurling Championship is the 137th edition of the Leinster Senior Hurling Championship since its establishment by the Leinster Council in 1888 and is the highest-tier of Hurling for senior county teams in Leinster (as well as Connacht and Ulster). It is contested by six Leinster affiliated GAA county teams ranked 1–6 in the 2024 All-Ireland Senior Hurling Championship.

Kilkenny were the defending champions having defeated Galway in the 2023 final.

== Format ==
=== Group stage (15 matches) ===
Each team plays each other once. The 1st and 2nd placed teams advance to the Leinster final and the 3rd placed team advances to the All-Ireland preliminary quarter-finals. All other teams are eliminated from the championship and the bottom placed team will be relegated to next years Joe McDonagh Cup.

=== Final (1 match) ===
The top 2 teams in the group stage contest this game. The Leinster champions advance to the All-Ireland semi-finals and the Leinster runners-up advance to the All-Ireland quarter-finals.

== Team changes ==
=== To Championship ===
Promoted from the Joe McDonagh Cup

- Carlow

=== From Championship ===
Relegated to the Joe McDonagh Cup

- Westmeath

== Teams ==
=== General Information ===
Six counties will compete in the Leinster Senior Hurling Championship:

County	Last Championship Title	Last All-Ireland Title	Position in 2023 Championship
Antrim	—	—	5th
Carlow	—	—	Champions (Joe McDonagh Cup)
Dublin	2013	1938	3rd
Galway	2018	2017	Runners-up
Kilkenny	2023	2015	Champions
Wexford	2019	1996	4th

=== Personnel and kits ===
County	Manager	Captain(s)	Sponsor
Antrim	Darren Gleeson	Conor McCann	Fibrus
Carlow			
Dublin	Micheál Donoghue	Eoghan O'Donnell and Cian O'Callaghan	AIG
Galway	Henry Shefflin	Daithí Burke and Joseph Cooney	Supermac's
Kilkenny	Derek Lyng	Richie Reid and Eoin Cody	Avonmore
Wexford	Keith Rossiter	Lee Chin	Zurich Insurance Group

== Group stage ==
=== Table ===
Pos	Team	Pld	W	D	L	SF	SA	Diff	Pts	Qualification
1	Kilkenny	5	3	2	0	8-131	7-99	+35	8	Advance to Leinster Final
2	Dublin	5	3	1	1	10-124	4-113	+29	7	Advance to Leinster Final
3	Wexford	5	2	1	2	8-125	6-100	+31	5	Advance to All-Ireland preliminary quarter-finals
4	Galway	5	2	1	2	7-120	6-112	+11	5	
5	Antrim	5	2	0	3	8-89	14-129	-58	4	
6	Carlow	5	0	1	4	6-91	10-127	-48	1	Relegated to Joe McDonagh Cup

=== Leinster round 1 ===
21 April 2024 Round 1	Wexford	1-21 (24) – (24) 2-18	Dublin	Wexford
2pm		(HT: 1-8 - 0-11)		Venue: Wexford Park
	Pts: Lee Chin 1-12 (1-0 penalty, 0-9 frees), Rory O’Connor 0-4, Mark Fanning, Conor McDonald, Conor Hearne, Cian Byrne, Cathal Dunbar 0-1 each	Report	Pts: Donal Burke 0-7 (6 frees, 1 ‘65), Cian O’Sullivan (0-2 frees), Danny Sutcliffe 1-2 each, Mark Grogan 0-2, Paddy Doyle, Conor Burke, Chris Crummey, Seán Currie, Ronan Hayes 0-1 each	Referee: J Murphy (Limerick); Attendance: 9,754

21 April 2024 Round 1	Galway	2-25 (31) – (20) 2-14	Carlow	Galway
2pm		(HT: 1-14 - 0-09)		Venue: Pearse Stadium
	Pts: Conor Cooney 1-10 (3f, 2 65s), Gavin Lee 1-2, Cathal Mannion and Conor Whelan 0-3 each, Tom Monaghan 0-2, Declan McLoughlin, Donal O'Shea, Adrian Touhey, Ronan Glennon and Evan Niland 0-1 each	Report	Pts: Martin Kavanagh 0-8 (5f), Jon Nolan 1-1, Conor Kehoe 1-0, Chris Nolan 0-2, Ciarán Whelan, Tony Lawlor and John Michael Nolan 0-1 each	Referee: S Stack (Dublin)

21 April 2024 Round 1	Kilkenny	5-30 (45) – (13) 0-13	Antrim	Kilkenny
2:30pm		(HT: 1-15 - 0-7)		Venue: Nowlan Park
	Pts: Billy Drennan 1-6 (1-0 pen, 0-2f, 0-1 65), Owen Wall 2-2, TJ Reid 1-5 (0-3f), Gearoid Dunne 1-1, Cian Kenny 0-4, John Donnelly 0-3, Martin Keoghan 0-3, Paddy Deegan 0-2, Adrian Mullen 0-1, Richie Reid 0-1, Mikey Carey 0-1, Shane Murphy 0-1	Report	Pts: Conal Cunning 0-7 (0-7f), James McNaughton 0-2, Conor McCann 0-1, Nigel Elliott 0-1, Eoghan Campbell 0-1, Conal Bohill 0-1	Referee: S Hynes (Galway); Attendance: 2,855

=== Leinster round 2 ===
27 April 2024 Round 2	Antrim	2-22 (28) – (26) 2-20	Wexford	Belfast
3pm		(HT: 0-12 - 2-9)		Venue: Corrigan Park
	Pts: C Cunning 0-7 (7fs), S Elliott 1-3, N McKenna 1-1, G Walsh 0-4 (1f, 1sl), K Molloy 0-2, J McNaughton 0-3 (2fs), C Boyd 0-1, N Elliott 0-1	Report	Pts: L Chin 2-11 (1-0 pen, 6fs), C Byrne 0-4, C McDonald 0-2, C Dunbar 0-1, R O'Connor 0-1, L Og McGovern 0-1	Referee: C Lyons (Cork); TV: GAAGO

27 April 2024 Round 2	Carlow	0-22 (22) – (27) 1-24	Dublin	Carlow
6pm		(HT: 0-13 - 0-9)		Venue: Dr Cullen Park
	Pts: M Kavanagh 0-13 (9fs, 2 65s); J Nolan 0-3; C Kehoe 0-2; C Nolan, P Boland, F Fitzpatrick, C Whelan 0-1 each	Report	Pts: D Burke 0-9 (8fs); F Whitely 1-1; C Burke 0-3; D Sutcliffe, D Gray, E O’Donnell 0-2 each; C O’Sullivan, S Currie, D Purcell, P Doyle, C Crummey 0-1 each	Referee: C Flynn (Westmeath); Attendance: 1,500

28 April 2024 Round 2	Galway	2-23 (29) – (29) 0-29	Kilkenny	Galway
2pm		(HT: 1-9 - 0-16)		Venue: Pearse Stadium
	Pts: Evan Niland 0-7 (6fs), Gavin Lee 1-2, Brian Concannon 1-1, Cathal Mannion and Conor Cooney (2fs, 165) 0-4 each, Conor Whelan 0-3, Cianan Fahy 0-2	Report	Pts: TJ Reid 0-8 (6fs, 165), Martin Keoghan and John Donnelly 0-4 each, Cian Kenny and Tom Phelan 0-3 each, Richie Reid and Jordan Molloy 0-2 each, Mikey Butler, David Blanchfield, and Billy Ryan 0-1 each	Referee: T Walsh (Waterford); Attendance: 9,621; TV: RTÉ2

=== Leinster round 3 ===
4 May 2024 Round 3	Wexford	1-28 (31) – (23) 0-23	Galway	Wexford
16:00		(HT: 0-15 – 0-13)		Venue: Wexford Park
	Pts: Lee Chin 0-11 (7 frees, 1 ’65), Rory O’Connor 1-6, Mark Fanning (frees), Conor McDonald, Cian Byrne 0-2 each, Conor Hearne, Damien Reck, Liam Óg McGovern, Conor Foley, Cathal Dunbar 0-1 each	Report	Pts: Evan Niland 0-11 (10 frees), Conor Cooney (one free), Gavin Lee, Tom Monaghan 0-2 each, Brian Concannon, Cianan Fahy, Conor Whelan, Ronan Glennon, Padraic Mannion, Declan McLoughlin 0-1 each	Referee: S Stack (Dublin); Attendance: 6,170; TV: GAAGO

11 May 2024 Round 3	Dublin	3-32 (41) – (21) 1-18	Antrim	Dublin
16:00		(HT: 1-13 - 1-7)		Venue: Parnell Park
	Pts: Donal Burke 1-11 (1-8fs), Sean Currie 0-5, Conor Burke 0-5, Paul Crummey 1-0, Brian Hayes 1-0, Cian O'Sullivan 0-2, John Bellew 0-2, Ronan Hayes 0-2, Danny Sutcliffe 0-1, Conor Donohoe 0-1, Fergal Whitely 0-1, Sean Gallagher 0-1, Darragh Power 0-1	Report	Pts: James McNaughton 1-2, Conal Cunning 0-4 (4fs), Eoghan Campbell 0-3, Seaan Elliott 0-2, Keelan Molloy 0-2, Gerard Walsh 0-2 (1f), Niall McKenna 0-1, Nigel Elliott 0-1, Fred McCurry 0-1	Referee: K Jordan (Tipperary)

11 May 2024 Round 3	Carlow	1-20 (23) – (23) 1-20	Kilkenny	Carlow
16:30		(HT: 0-9 - 1-11)		Venue: Dr Cullen Park
	Pts: Marty Kavanagh 0-9 (8fs, 65), Chris Nolan 0-4, Conor Kehoe 1-0, Fiachra Fitzpatrick 0-2, Kevin McDonald (f), John Michael Nolan, James Doyle, Paddy Boland, Donagh Murphy 0-1 each	Report	Pts: TJ Reid 0-6 (4fs), Owen Wall 1-3, Martin Keoghan, Cian Kenny 0-3 each, Tom Phelan 0-2, Huw Lawlor, Billy Ryan, Shane Murphy 0-1 each	Referee: C Mooney (Dublin); TV: GAAGO

=== Leinster round 4 ===
18 May 2024 Round 4	Antrim	1-14 (17) – (31) 2-25	Galway	Belfast
3pm		(HT: 1-11 - 1-10)		Venue: Corrigan Park
	Pts: J McNaughton 0-8 (4fs), K Molloy 0-3, C Bohill 1-0, G Walsh 0-2 (1f, 1sl), M Bradley 0-1	Report	Pts: C Cooney 1-6 (1-0 pen, 3fs, 0-1 ), E Niland 0-5 (3fs), C Whelan 0-3, G Lee 1-0, S Linnane 0-2, D O'Shea 0-2, David Burke 0-1, Daithí Burke 0-1, P Mannion 0-1, C Fahy 0-1, T Monaghan 0-1, J Cooney 0-1, J Glynn 0-1	Referee: M Kennedy (Tipperary)

18 May 2024 Round 4	Dublin	2-23 (29) – (31) 1-28	Kilkenny	Dublin
6pm		(HT: 1-12 - 0-16)		Venue: Parnell Park
	Pts: Donal Burke 0-14 (0-10f, 0-1 65), Conor Burke 1-1, Brian Hayes 1-0, Danny Sutcliffe 0-3, Chris Crummey 0-3, Cian O'Sullivan 0-2	Report	Pts: TJ Reid 0-8 (7fs), John Donnelly 0-7, Eoin Cody 1-3, Martin Keoghan 0-3, David Blanchfield 0-3, Cian Kenny 0-2, Mikey Carey 0-1, Billy Ryan 0-1	Referee: J Murphy (Limerick); Attendance: 7,028; TV: GAAGO

19 May 2024 Round 4	Carlow	1-13 (16) – (42) 2-36	Wexford	Carlow
3pm		(HT: 1-7 - 1-21)		Venue: Dr Cullen Park
	Pts: Marty Kavanagh 0-5fs, Conor Kehoe 1-2, Chris Nolan 0-4, Paddy Boland, Richard Coady 0-1 each	Report	Pts: Lee Chin 0-13 (10fs), Conor McDonald 2-2, Rory O’Connor 0-5, Cathal Dunbar, Damien Reck, Conor Hearne, Tomás Kinsella 0-2 each, Liam Og McGovern, Mark Fanning, Richie Lawlor, Liam Ryan, Darragh Carley, Kevin Foley, Charlie McGuckin, Seamus Casey 0-1 each	Referee: T Gleeson (Dublin)

=== Leinster round 5 ===
26 May 2024 Round 5	Kilkenny	1-24 (27) – (26) 2-20	Wexford	Kilkenny
14:00		(HT: 0-12 - 1-11)		Venue: Nowlan Park
	Pts: TJ Reid 1-13 (1-0pen, 12fs, 1 sideline), Paddy Deegan 0-3, Billy Ryan 0-3, John Donnelly 0-1, Richie Reid 0-1, Martin Keoghan 0-1, Mikey Carey 0-1, Eoin Cody 0-1	Report	Pts: Lee Chin 0-7 (6fs), Cian Byrne 1-3, Conor McDonald 1-2, Rory O'Connor 0-2, Cathal Dunbar 0-2, Liam Og McGovern 0-1, Kevin Foley 0-1, Jack O'Connor 0-1, Conor Hearne 0-1	Referee: L Gordon (Galway); Attendance: 18,785; TV: GAAGO

26 May 2024 Round 5	Galway	1-24 (27) – (33) 2-27	Dublin	Galway
14:00		(HT: 0-19 - 2-11)		Venue: Pearse Stadium
	Pts: Evan Niland 0-8 (5fs, 1 65), Conor Cooney 0-3, Declan McLoughlin 1-0, Joseph Cooney, Tom Monaghan and Cianan Fahy 0-2 each, Gavin Lee, Seán Linnane, Jason Flynn, David Burke, Conor Whelan, Padraic Mannion and Adrian Tuohey 0-1 each	Report	Pts: Dónal Burke 1-10 (3fs, 2 65s), Chris Crummey 0-4, Darragh Power 0-3, Seán Currie 1-0, Fergal Whiteley, Conor Burke, Brian Hayes, John Bellew, Ronan Hayes, Dara Purcell, Danny Sutcliffe, Paddy Smyth, Conor Donohue and Colin Currie 0-1 each	Referee: C Lyons (Cork); Attendance: 8,087; TV: RTÉ2

26 May 2024 Round 5	Antrim	4-22 (34) – (28) 2-22	Carlow	Belfast
14:00		(HT: 3-9 - 1-14)		Venue: Corrigan Park
	Pts: C Cunning 2-7 (1-0 pen, 6fs, 2 65s), J McNaughton 2-3, K Molloy 0-3, N O'Connor 0-2, G Walsh 0-2 (2fs), S Elliott 0-1, P Burke 0-1, N Elliott 0-1, C McCann 0-1, C Boyd 0-1	Report	Pts: M Kavanagh 1-11 (8fs, 2 65s), C Nolan 1-1, J Doyle 0-3, C Kehoe 0-3, JM Nolan 0-1, C Whelan 0-1, J Kavanagh 0-1, K McDonald 0-1	Referee: J Owens (Wexford)

== Knockout stage ==
=== Leinster Final ===
8 June 2024
6pm
Final

Kilkenny	3-28 (37) – (21) 1-18	Dublin
TJ Reid 2-6 (0-3f); A Mullen 0-7; E Cody 1-2; C Kenny 0-4; J Donnelly 0-3; M Keoghan 0-2; B Ryan, D Blanchfield, T Phelan, W Walsh 0-1 each	Report	D Burke 0-8 (7f); C Burke 0-3; M Grogan 1-0; D Purcell 0-2; J Bellew, P Smyth, C Crummey, D Sutcliffe, D Power 0-1 each

Croke Park
Attendance: 35,484
Referee: T Walsh (Waterford)
Man of the match: Adrian Mullen (Kilkenny)
- Kilkenny advance to the All-Ireland semi-finals and Dublin advance to the All-Ireland quarter-finals

== Stadia and locations ==
Locations of the 2024 Leinster SHC teams.

County	Location	Province	Stadium	Capacity
Neutral venue	Dublin	Leinster	Croke Park	82,300
Antrim	Belfast	Ulster	Corrigan Park	3,700
Carlow	Carlow	Leinster	Dr Cullen Park	11,000
Dublin	Donnycarney	Leinster	Parnell Park	7,300
Galway	Galway	Connacht	Pearse Stadium	26,197
Kilkenny	Kilkenny	Leinster	Nowlan Park	27,000
Wexford	Wexford	Leinster	Chadwicks Wexford Park	18,000

== Championship statistics ==
=== Scoring events ===
- Widest winning margin: 32 points
  - Kilkenny 5-30 - 0-13 Antrim (Round 1)
- Most goals in a match: 6
  - Antrim 4-22 - 2-22 Carlow (Round 5)
- Most points in a match: 52
  - Galway 2-23 - 0-29 Kilkenny (Round 2)
- Most goals by one team in a match: 5
  - Kilkenny 5-30 - 0-13 Antrim (Round 1)
- Most points by one team in a match: 32
  - Carlow 1-13 - 2-36 Wexford (Round 4)
- Highest aggregate score: 62 points
  - Dublin 3-32 - 1-18 Antrim (Round 3)
  - Antrim 4-22 - 2-22 Carlow (Round 5)
- Lowest aggregate score: 46 points
  - Carlow 1-20 - 1-20 Kilkenny (Round 3)

== Miscellaneous ==
- Carlow and Kilkenny ended in a draw for the first ever time ever.

== See also ==
- 2024 All-Ireland Senior Hurling Championship
- 2024 Munster Senior Hurling Championship
- 2024 Joe McDonagh Cup (Tier 2)
- 2024 Christy Ring Cup (Tier 3)
- 2024 Nicky Rackard Cup (Tier 4)
- 2024 Lory Meagher Cup (Tier 5)
