= John Teehan =

Irish hurler

Personal information
- Native name: Seán Ó Téacháin (Irish)
- Born: 1939 (age 86–87) Barrack Hill, County Kilkenny, Ireland
- Occupation: Farmer
- Height: 6 ft 1 in (185 cm)

Sport
- Sport: Hurling
- Position: Midfield
Clubs
- Years: Club
- Freshford; Threecastles; St Lachtain's
Club titles
- Kilkenny titles: 2
Inter-county*
Years	County	Apps (scores)
1962-1967	Kilkenny	10 (2-08)
Inter-county titles
- Leinster titles: 4
- All-Irelands: 1
- NHL: 1
- *Inter County team apps and scores correct as of 20:43, 5 June 2018.

John Teehan (born 1939) is an Irish former hurler. A player in both the midfield and centre-forward positions, he was a member of the Kilkenny team that won the 1967 All-Ireland Championship.

Born in the parish of Graigue-Ballycallan, Teehan first played hurling at juvenile level with Freshford. After a brief spell playing junior hurling with Threecastles, he later joined the amalgamated St Lachtain's senior team with whom he won county championship medals in 1961 and 1963.

Teehan was selected on the Kilkenny junior team in 1960. After a series of successful trials he was added to the Kilkenny senior panel for the 1962 championship before being dropped for the Leinster final. Teehan was again a panellist for the 1963 championship, winning a Leinster medal on the bench before being dropped for the All-Ireland final. He became a member of the starting fifteen in 1964 and went on to win Leinster medals on the field of play in 1964, 1966 and 1967, as well as a National Hurling League medal in 1966. Teehan ended his career in 1967 after winning his sole All-Ireland medal following a defeat of Tipperary.

As a member of the Leinster inter-provincial team in 1967, Teehan won his sole Railway Cup medal.

== Honours ==
St Lachtain's

- Kilkenny Senior Hurling Championship (2): 1961, 1963

Kilkenny

- All-Ireland Senior Hurling Championship (1): 1967
- Leinster Senior Hurling Championship (4): 1963, 1964, 1966, 1967
- National Hurling League (1): 1965-66

Leinster

- Railway Cup (1): 1967
