= Ned Buggy =

Irish hurler and selector

Personal information
- Native name: Éamonn Ó Bogaigh (Irish)
- Born: 1948 (age 77–78) Wexford, Ireland
- Occupation: Sports shop owner
- Height: 5 ft 10 in (178 cm)

Sport
- Sport: Hurling
- Position: Midfield
Club
- Years: Club
- 1960-1985: Faythe Harriers
Club titles
- Wexford titles: 1
Inter-county
Years	County	Apps (scores)
1967-1982	Wexford	26 (14-98)
Inter-county titles
- Leinster titles: 4
- All-Irelands: 1
- NHL: 1
- All Stars: 1

Ned Buggy (born 1948) is an Irish retired hurling selector and former player who enjoyed a successful career as a midfielder with the Wexford senior team.

Born Wexford, Buggy was introduced to hurling in his youth. He had some championship successes at underage levels with the Faythe Harriers club before later claiming a championship medal at senior level.

Buggy made his debut on the inter-county scene at the age of sixteen when he first linked up with the Wexford minor team. An All-Ireland medal winner in this grade he later was an All-Ireland runner-up with the under-21 team. Buggy made his senior debut during the 1966-67 league. He went on to play a key role for Wexford at midfield during a successful era and won one All-Ireland medal as a non-playing substitute, four Leinster medals and one National Hurling League medal. Buggy was an All-Ireland runner-up on two occasions.

As a member of the Leinster inter-provincial team, Buggy won two Railway Cup medals. Throughout his inter-county career, he made 26 championship appearances. Buggy retired from inter-county hurling following the conclusion of the 1982 championship.

After retiring from playing, Buggy became involved in team management and coaching as a selector with the Leinster inter-provincial team.

== Playing career ==
=== Club ===
Buggy first played for Faythe Harriers as a juvenile in 1960. He claimed a championship medal in this grade in 1964 before later claiming a minor championship medal in 1966 followed by three successive under-21 championship medals.

In 1981 Buggy lined out at left corner-forward in his third senior championship decider. Buffers Alley provided the opposition, but a late goal from a '65' by Buggy ended up in the net. The narrow 2-10 to 2-9 victory gave him a Wexford Senior Hurling Championship medal.

=== Minor and under-21 ===
Buggy joined the Wexford minor team in 1965, however, their championship campaign ended without success. Eligible for the grade again in 1966, Buggy won a Leinster medal that year following a huge 7-6 to 1-7 defeat of Laois. On 4 September 1966, Wexford faced Cork in the All-Ireland decider. Wexford came from behind in the last five minutes to level the game at 6-7 apiece. The replay on 16 October 1966 also saw Wexford stage a late rally with two goals. A 4-1 to 1-8 victory secured an All-Ireland Minor Hurling Championship medal for Buggy.

By 1969 Buggy was in his final year with the Wexford under-21 team. A 3-16 to 4-3 defeat of reigning provincial champions Kilkenny gave him a Leinster medal in this grade. On 14 September 1969, Wexford faced Cork in the All-Ireland decider. Buggy scored 0-3 from play, however, Cork was superior in securing their third successive championship with a 5-13 to 4-7 victory.

=== Senior ===
Buggy made his senior championship debut in a 3-15 to 3-11 Leinster semi-final defeat of Dublin on 16 June 1968. He was an unused substitute throughout the rest of the campaign as Wexford claimed the Leinster and All-Ireland titles following respective defeats of Kilkenny and Tipperary.

After surrendering their championship titles in 1969, Wexford regrouped the following year. A 4–16 to 3–14 defeat of old rivals Kilkenny in the first 80-minute championship game gave Buggy a second Leinster medal, his first on the field of play. Wexford subsequently faced Cork in the All-Ireland decider on 6 September 1970, however, an injury ruled Buggy out of the game. A 6–21 to 5–10 score gave Cork the victory.

Buggy won a National Hurling League medal in 1973 following a 4–13 to 3–7 defeat of Limerick.

After a five-year period of Kilkenny dominance, Wexford broke through in 1976. A 2–20 to 1–6 trouncing gave Buggy a third Leinster medal. Cork provided the opposition in the subsequent All-Ireland final on 5 September 1976. Wexford got off to a great start and were 2–2 to no score ahead after just six minutes. Wexford had a two-point lead with ten minutes to go, however, three points from Jimmy Barry-Murphy, two from Pat Moylan and a kicked effort from Ray Cummins gave Cork a 2–21 to 4–11 victory.

Buggy collected his fourth Leinster medal in 1977 following a 3–17 to 3–14 defeat of Kilkenny. The All-Ireland final on 4 September 1977 was a repeat of the previous year, with Cork providing the opposition once again. Seánie O'Leary scored the decisive goal for Cork as the game entered the last quarter, while Martin Coleman brought off a match-winning save from Christy Keogh to foil the Wexford comeback. A 1–17 to 3–8 defeat was Buggy's lot as he endured a second successive year as an All-Ireland runner-up.

Wexford went into decline following this defeat as Kilkenny and Offaly emerged as the dominant teams in Leinster. In spite of this Buggy won an All-Star award in 1979.

=== Inter-provincial ===
Buggy also lined out with Leinster in the inter-provincial series of games and enjoyed much success. In 1977 he was at midfield as Leinster faced Munster in the decider. A 2-17 to 1-13 victory gave him a Railway Cup medal.

In 1979, Buggy won a second Railway Cup medal as Leinster defeated Connacht by 1-13 to 1-9.

== Honours ==
=== Player ===
Faythe Harriers

- Wexford Senior Hurling Championship (1): 1981
- Wexford Under-21 Hurling Championship (3): 1967, 1968, 1969
- Wexford Minor Hurling Championship (1): 1966

Wexford

- All-Ireland Senior Hurling Championship (1): 1968 (sub)
- Leinster Senior Hurling Championship (4): 1968 (sub), 1970, 1976, 1977
- National Hurling League (1): 1972–73
- Leinster Under-21 Hurling Championship (1): 1969
- All-Ireland Minor Hurling Championship (1): 1966
- Leinster Minor Hurling Championship (1): 1966

Leinster

- Railway Cup (2): 1977, 1979

=== Selector ===
Leinster

- Railway Cup (1): 1993
