= 2014 Leinster Senior Hurling Championship final =

2014 Leinster Senior Hurling final
- Event: 2014 Leinster Senior Hurling Championship
Kilkenny	Dublin
0-24	1-9
- Date: 6 July 2014
- Venue: Croke Park, Dublin
- Referee: B Kelly (Westmeath)
- Attendance: 32,567
- Weather: Sunny

The 2014 Leinster Senior Hurling Championship final, the deciding game of the 2014 Leinster Senior Hurling Championship, was a hurling match played on 6 July 2014 at Croke Park, Dublin, contested by Dublin and Kilkenny.

Kilkenny, captained by Lester Ryan won their 69th Leinster hurling title with a dominant display in a 0-24 to 1-9 win over defending champions Dublin. TJ Reid scored 10 points for Kilkenny, eight from placed balls. Kilkenny had a 0-13 to 1-6 lead at half-time. Henry Shefflin equalled Michael Kavanagh’s record with his 13th Leinster title winning medal.

== Match details ==
6 July 2014
16:00
Final

Dublin	1-09 - 0-24	Kilkenny
C Cronin (1-01), A McCrabbe (0-03, 0-03f), D O'Callaghan, D Sutcliffe, C McCormack (0-01 each), C Keaney (0-01, 0-01 pen)	report	TJ Reid (0-10, 0-04f, 0-04'65), C Fennelly, H Shefflin (0-03 each), P Walsh (0-02), R Hogan (0-02, 0-01f), B Hogan, W Walsh, J Power, A Fogarty (0-01 each)

Croke Park
Attendance: 32,567
Referee: B Kelly (Westmeath)
