= Ted Kelly =

South African rugby union player (b. 1869, d. 1949)

- Born: Edward William Kelly; 23 October 1869 King William's Town, Cape Colony
- Died: 11 March 1949 (aged 79)

Rugby union career
- Position: Forward
Provincial / State sides
Years	Team	Apps	(Points)
1896	Griquas	0	(0)
International career
Years	Team	Apps	(Points)
1896	South Africa	1	(0)
- Correct as of 27 May 2019

Ted Kelly (23 October 1869 – 11 March 1949) was a South African international rugby union player who played as a forward.

He made 1 appearance for South Africa against the British Lions in 1896.
