= Martin Power (hurler) =

Irish hurler

Personal information
- Native name: Máirtín de Paor (Irish)
- Born: 20 May 1899 Callan, County Kilkenny, Ireland
- Died: 7 March 1957 (aged 57) Arbour Hill, Dublin, Ireland
- Occupation: Army officer

Sport
- Sport: Hurling
- Position: Centre-forward
Clubs
- Years: Club
- Tullaroan; Army Metro; Parnells
Club titles
- Kilkenny titles: 2
Inter-county
- Years: County
- 1926-1934: Kilkenny
Inter-county titles
- Leinster titles: 4
- All-Irelands: 2
- NHL: 1

Martin Power (20 May 1899 – 7 March 1957) was an Irish hurler who played as a centre-forward for the Kilkenny senior.

Born in Callan, County Kilkenny, Power first arrived on the inter-county scene at the age of twenty-six when he first linked up with the Kilkenny senior team. He made his senior debut during the 1926 championship. Power immediately became a regular member of the starting fifteen, and won two All-Ireland medals, four Leinster medals and one National Hurling League medal.

As a member of the Leinster inter-provincial team on a number of occasions, Power won one Railway Cup medal. At club level he played with Army Metro in Dublin.

Power retired from inter-county hurling following the conclusion of the 1934 championship.

== Honours ==
Army Metro

- Dublin Senior Hurling Championship: 1933, 1935

Kilkenny

- All-Ireland Senior Hurling Championship: 1932, 1933
- Leinster Senior Hurling Championship: 1926, 1929, 1932, 1933
- National Hurling League: 1932-33
