= 2012 Leinster Senior Hurling Championship final =

2012 Leinster Senior Hurling final
- Event: 2012 Leinster Senior Hurling Championship
Galway	Kilkenny
2-21	2-11
- Date: 8 July 2012
- Venue: Croke Park, Dublin
- Referee: J. McGrath (Westmeath)
- Attendance: 22,171
- Weather: Dry

The 2012 Leinster Senior Hurling Championship final, the deciding game of the 2012 Leinster Senior Hurling Championship, was a hurling match played on 8 July 2012 at Croke Park, Dublin. Contested by Galway and Kilkenny, most experts gave the former little chance against the latter.

== Pre-match ==
Galway were 11/2 outsiders going into this game. On the day of the game RTÉ delivered a verdict favouring Kilkenny, saying "Kilkenny's vice-like grip on the Leinster title is set to remain as tight as ever, unless Galway can produce something extraordinary at Croke Park today".

== Match summary ==
Galway managed by Anthony Cunningham, secured a historic first ever Leinster title, after unexpectedly defeating the 2011 All-Ireland Senior Hurling Champions, Kilkenny. In doing so they held Kilkenny scoreless for the first twenty minutes, had 1-6 to 0-0 lead after 18 minutes, and led at half-time by 2-12 to 0-4, the full-time score of was 2-21 to 2-11. The result sent the Bob O'Keeffe Cup across the Shannon for the first time in the GAA's 128-year history.

8 July 2012
16:00 IST

Galway	2–21 – 2–11	Kilkenny
J Canning (1-10, 7fs), C Donnellan (0-05), D Burke (1-02), N Burke (0-02), D Collins (0-01), D Hayes (0-01).	Report	H Shefflin (1-08, 7fs), R Hogan (1-00), R Power (0-02), M Rice (0-01).

Croke Park, Dublin
Attendance: 22,171
Referee: J. McGrath (Westmeath)

Galway	Kilkenny

== Post-match ==
Kilkenny manager Brian Cody said afterwards that his team were "wiped out" by Galway. The Irish Examiner reported on "a historic day in Croke Park [...] a day that may also go down in history for another reason, however, the day an empire began to crumble". Martin Breheny, writing in the Irish Independent, called it "one of the most remarkable shut-outs of modern-day hurling" and reported that Galway had moved to the top of the selection of teams to have beaten the Cats "after subjecting Kilkenny to a systematic beating which nobody thought remotely possible".

The teams would meet again in the 2012 All-Ireland Senior Hurling Championship final to decide the destination of the Liam MacCarthy Cup, with Kilkenny winning that game after a replay.

== Sale of medal ==
A 2012 Leinster Senior Hurling Championship winners' medal was later sold on eBay for €570.
