= Willie Dunphy =

Irish sportsperson

Personal information
- Native name: Liam Ó Donnchaidh (Irish)
- Born: 1992 (age 33–34) Clough, County Laois, Ireland
- Occupation: Cabinet maker

Sport
- Sport: Hurling
- Position: Full-forward
Club
- Years: Club
- Clough–Ballacolla
Club titles
- Laois titles: 3
Inter-county*
Years	County	Apps (scores)
2011-present	Laois	9 (1-07)
Inter-county titles
- Leinster titles: 0
- All-Irelands: 0
- NHL: 0
- All Stars: 0
- *Inter County team apps and scores correct as of 21:38, 8 July 2021.

William Dunphy (born 1992) is an Irish hurler who plays for Laois Senior Championship club Clough–Ballacolla and at inter-county level with the Laois senior hurling team. He currently lines out as a full-forward.

== Career ==
Dunphy first came to prominence as a member of the Clough–Ballacolla club at juvenile and underage levels. He eventually joined the club's senior team and has since won County Championship titles in 2009, 2011 and 2015. He made his first appearances at inter-county level during a two-year stint with the Laois minor team, before a three-year tenure with the Laois under-21 team. Dunphy joined the Laois senior hurling team straight out of the minor grade in 2011 and collected his first silverware two years later with a National Hurling League Division 2A title. He was at corner-forward when Laois secured the 2019 Joe McDonagh Cup title.

== Honours ==
Clough–Ballacolla

- Laois Senior Hurling Championship: 2009, 2011, 2015

Laois

- Joe McDonagh Cup: 2019
- National Hurling League Division 2A: 2013
