= 2013 Leinster Senior Hurling Championship final =

2013 Leinster Senior Hurling final
- Event: 2013 Leinster Senior Hurling Championship
| Dublin | Galway |
| 2-25 | 2-13 |
- Date: 7 July 2013
- Venue: Croke Park, Dublin
- Man of the Match: Paul Ryan
- Referee: J Ryan (Tipperary)
- Attendance: 36,657
- Weather: Sunny

The 2013 Leinster Senior Hurling Championship final, the deciding game of the 2013 Leinster Senior Hurling Championship, was a hurling match played on 7 July 2013 at Croke Park, Dublin. Contested by Dublin and Galway.

== Match Summary ==
Dublin led by 1-12 to 0-7 at half time with the goal coming from Paul Ryan who shot low to the net. Ryan got a second goal in the second half, again shooting low to the goalkeepers left and into the corner of the net as Dublin ran out comfortable winners to claim their first Leinster title since 1961 with a 2-25 to 2-13 win. John McCaffrey became the first Dublin captain to lift the Bob O'Keeffe trophy in 52 years.

7 July 2013
16:00
Final

| Dublin | 2-25 - 2-13 | Galway |
|---|---|---|
| P Ryan 2-7 (0-4fs), D O'Callaghan 0-4, R O'Dwyer 0-3, C Keaney, J Boland, J McCaffrey, C McCormack 0-2 each, M Carton, D Sutcliffe, S Lambert 0-1 each. | Report | J Canning 1-7 (0-4fs), D Burke 1-0, C Cooney 0-2, I Tannian, J Regan, A Harte, J Glynn 0-1 each |

Croke Park
Attendance: 36,657
Referee: J Ryan (Tipperary)

== Reaction ==
Dublin manager Anthony Daly felt that his side’s four-match run-up to the final had stood to them against Galway, saying "We hoped to get off to a good start and we did, even though it was two points all, three all, four for a long time but we kicked on after about 15. We got the bit of a lead and a bit of momentum and the goal came then, and it was a great break to get." Galway manager Anthony Cunningham accepted that his team were second best on the day, saying "I think Dublin showed fantastic skill, fantastic fitness levels, and fantastic strength there. They were the clear winners."
