= 1897 All-Ireland Senior Hurling Championship final =

1897 All-Ireland Senior Hurling Final
- Event: 1897 All-Ireland Senior Hurling Championship
Limerick	Kilkenny
3-4	2-4
- Date: 20 November 1898
- Venue: Tipperary GAA Field, Tipperary
- Referee: J. J. McCabe (Dublin)
- Attendance: 5,000

The 1897 All-Ireland Senior Hurling Championship Final was the 10th All-Ireland Final and the culmination of the 1897 All-Ireland Senior Hurling Championship, an inter-county hurling tournament for the top teams in Ireland. The match was held at the Tipperary GAA Field, on 20 November 1898 between Kilkenny, represented by club side Tullaroan, and Limerick, represented by club side Kilfinane. The Leinster champions lost to their Munster opponents on a score line of 3–4 to 2–4.

== Match details ==
1898-11-20

Limerick	3-4 – 2-4	Kilkenny

Tipperary GAA Field, Tipperary
Attendance: 5,000
Referee: J. J. McCabe (Dublin)

== Aftermath ==
The great-great-grandson of one of the winning Limerick players was association football player Andy O'Brien.
