= 2016 Leinster Senior Hurling Championship final =

2016 Leinster Senior Hurling final
- Event: 2016 Leinster Senior Hurling Championship
Galway	Kilkenny
0-22	1-26
- Date: 3 July 2016
- Venue: Croke Park, Dublin
- Man of the Match: Conor Fogarty
- Referee: Fergal Horgan ( Tipperary)
- Attendance: 29,377
- Weather: Dry and Sunny

The 2016 Leinster Senior Hurling Championship final, the deciding game of the 2016 Leinster Senior Hurling Championship, was a hurling match played on 3 July 2016 at Croke Park, Dublin. It was contested by Galway and Kilkenny, a repeat of the previous final. In 2015, Kilkenny claimed their 70th Leinster crown by defeating The Tribesmen on a scoreline of 1-25 to 2-15.

== Match details ==
3 July 2016
16:00
Final

Galway	0-22 - 1-26	Kilkenny
J Canning 0-6 (0-6f), C Mannion 0-5, C Cooney 0-3, C Whelan 0-3, J Cooney 0-2, D Glennon 0-1, C Donnellan 0-1, A Smith 0-1.	Report	TJ Reid 0-10 (0-7f, 1 65), J Farrell 1-4, R Hogan 0-5, C Fogarty 0-3, W Walsh 0-2, J Power 0-1, M Fennelly 0-1.

Croke Park
Attendance: 29,377
Referee: Fergal Horgan ( Tipperary)

Galway	Kilkenny
