= 2021 Leinster Senior Hurling Championship final =

Hurling match

2021 Leinster Senior Hurling final
- Event: 2021 Leinster Senior Hurling Championship
Dublin	Kilkenny
0–19	1–25
- Date: 17 July 2021
- Venue: Croke Park, Dublin
- Referee: Johnny Murphy (Limerick)
- Attendance: 18,000
- Weather: Dry

The 2021 Leinster Senior Hurling Championship final, the deciding game of the 2021 Leinster Senior Hurling Championship, was a hurling match that was played on 17 July 2021 at Croke Park, Dublin. It was contested by Kilkenny and Dublin.

Kilkenny, captained by Adrian Mullen, won the game by 1–25 to 0–19. The Dublin team had some withdrawals due to some players being close contacts of a confirmed Covid case. The match was tight in the 1st half but Kilkenny scored the last 3 points of the half to lead 0–12 to 0–9 at half time. Kilkenny stayed in front in the 2nd half and received a penalty in the 61st minute when Alan Murphy was fouled. Jake Malone was sin binned. TJ Reid scored a goal from the penalty and this score proved decisive.

== Details ==
RTÉ

17 July 2021
19:30
Final

Report

Kilkenny	1–25 (28) – (19) 0–19	Dublin
(HT: 0–12 – 0-09)
Gls: TJ Reid 1 (pen). Pts: TJ Reid 10 (8fs, 1 65), J Maher 3, M Keoghan 2, A Mullen 2, A Murphy 2, J Bergin 2, E Cody 1, J Donnelly 1, M Carey 1, C Buckley 1.		Pts: D Burke 10 (8fs), D Sutcliffe 2, C Crummey 2, A Nolan 1 (1f); R McBride 1, C Boland 1, J Malone 1, D Keogh 1.

Croke Park, Dublin
Referee: J Murphy (Limerick)
Attendance: 18,000
