= 1897 All-Ireland Senior Hurling Championship =

All-Ireland champions
- Winning team: Limerick (1st win)
- Captain: Denis Grimes

All-Ireland Finalists
- Losing team: Kilkenny
- Captain: Jackie Walsh

Provincial champions
- Munster: Limerick
- Leinster: Kilkenny
- Ulster: Not Played
- Connacht: Not Played

Championship statistics
- All-Star Team: See here

The All-Ireland Senior Hurling Championship 1897 was the 11th series of the All-Ireland Senior Hurling Championship, Ireland's premier hurling knock-out competition. Limerick won the championship, beating Kilkenny 3–4 to 2–4 in the final.

== Format ==
All-Ireland Championship

Semi-final: (1 match) This is a lone game which sees the winners of the Leinster championship play Galway who receive a bye to this stage. One team is eliminated while the winning team advances to the final.

Final: (1 match) The winners of the lone semi-final play the winners of the Munster championship.

== Provincial championships ==
=== Leinster Senior Hurling Championship ===
Quarter-final

Offaly	2–3 – 1–4	Laois

Jones's Road, Dublin

Semi-final

Kilkenny	2–6 – 2–6	Dublin

Semi-final replay

Kilkenny	6–13 – 1–4	Dublin

16 October 1898
Final

Kilkenny	w/o – scr.	Wexford

Jones's Road, Dublin

=== Munster Senior Hurling Championship ===
Semi-final

Limerick	2–5 – 2–3	Clare

Limerick

Semi-final

Cork	4–16 – 0–2	Tipperary

Cork

Final

Limerick	4–9 – 1–6	Cork

Tipperary

== All-Ireland Senior Hurling Championship ==
=== All-Ireland semi-finals ===
30 October 1898
Semi-final

Kilkenny	3–4 – 0–4	Galway

Jones's Road, Dublin

=== All-Ireland Final ===
20 November 1898
Final

Limerick	3–4 – 2–4	Kilkenny

Jones's Road, Dublin
Attendance: c.5,000
Referee: J. J. McCabe (Dublin)

== Championship statistics ==
=== Miscellaneous ===
- Limerick win the Munster championship for the first time. It was their fourth appearance in the final.
- An All-Ireland semi-final is played for the first time since the 1887 championship. That game is the first ever championship meeting of Galway and Kilkenny.
- The All-Ireland final is the first championship meeting of Kilkenny and Limerick. The win gives Limerick their very first championship.
- Limerick become fifth team to win the All-Ireland hurling title. They become the fourth team to have won an All-Ireland title in both hurling and Gaelic football.

== Roll of Honour ==
- Cork – 4 (1894)
- Tipperary – 3 (1896)
- Limerick – 1 (1897)
- Dublin – 1 (1889)
- Kerry – 1 (1891)

== Sources ==
- Corry, Eoghan, The GAA Book of Lists (Hodder Headline Ireland, 2005).
- Donegan, Des, The Complete Handbook of Gaelic Games (DBA Publications Limited, 2005).
