= Kilkenny county hurling team =

Hurling team

Kilkenny
- Sport: Hurling
- Irish: Cill Chainnigh
- Nickname(s): The Cats; The Stripey Men; The Noresiders; The Black and Amber
- County board: Kilkenny GAA
- Manager: Henry Shefflin
- Home venue(s): Nowlan Park, Kilkenny

Recent competitive record
- Current All-Ireland status: Leinster (4th in 2026)
- Last championship title: 2015
- Current NHL Division: 1A (5th in 2026)
- Last league title: 2021 joint with Galway
First colours	Second colours

The Kilkenny county hurling team represents Kilkenny in hurling and is governed by Kilkenny GAA, the county board of the Gaelic Athletic Association. The team competes in the three major annual inter-county competitions; the All-Ireland Senior Hurling Championship, the Leinster Senior Hurling Championship, and the National Hurling League. Historically, Kilkenny is the most successful team at senior level.

Kilkenny's home ground is Nowlan Park, Kilkenny. The team's manager is Derek Lyng.

The team last won the Leinster Senior Championship in 2025, the All-Ireland Senior Championship in 2015 and the National League in 2021.

== History ==
Kilkenny is the most successful county team at senior level in the history of the game of hurling. Kilkenny has won the All-Ireland Senior Hurling Championship (SHC) 36 times and has won the provincial Leinster Senior Hurling Championship (SHC) on 75 occasions, as of 2023.

=== 1922–1947: Beginning of the modern era ===
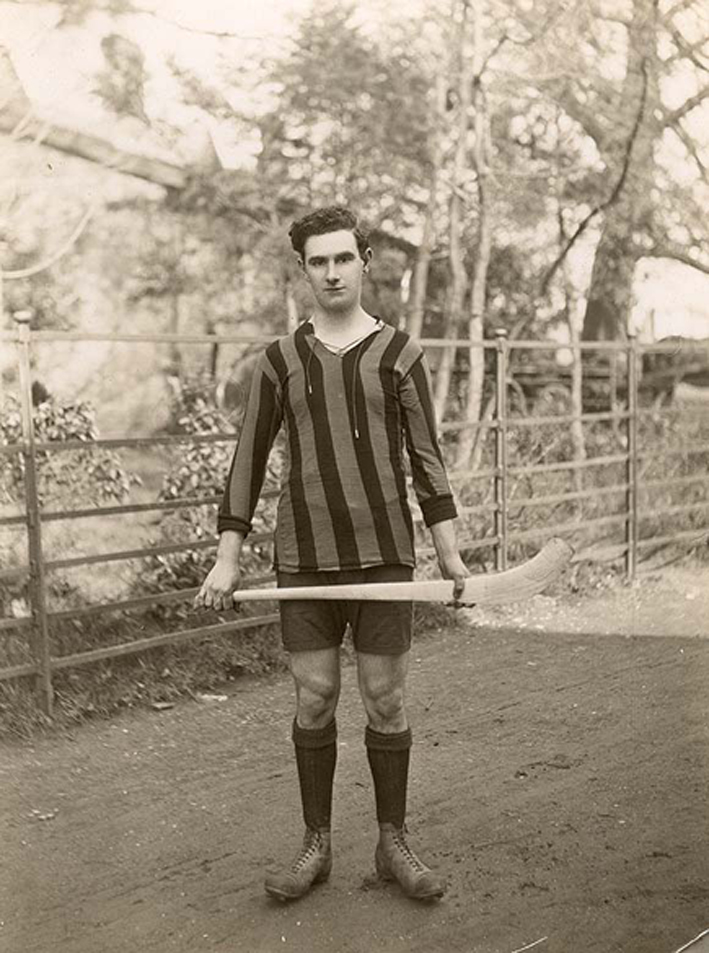
A Kilkenny hurler, c. 1923

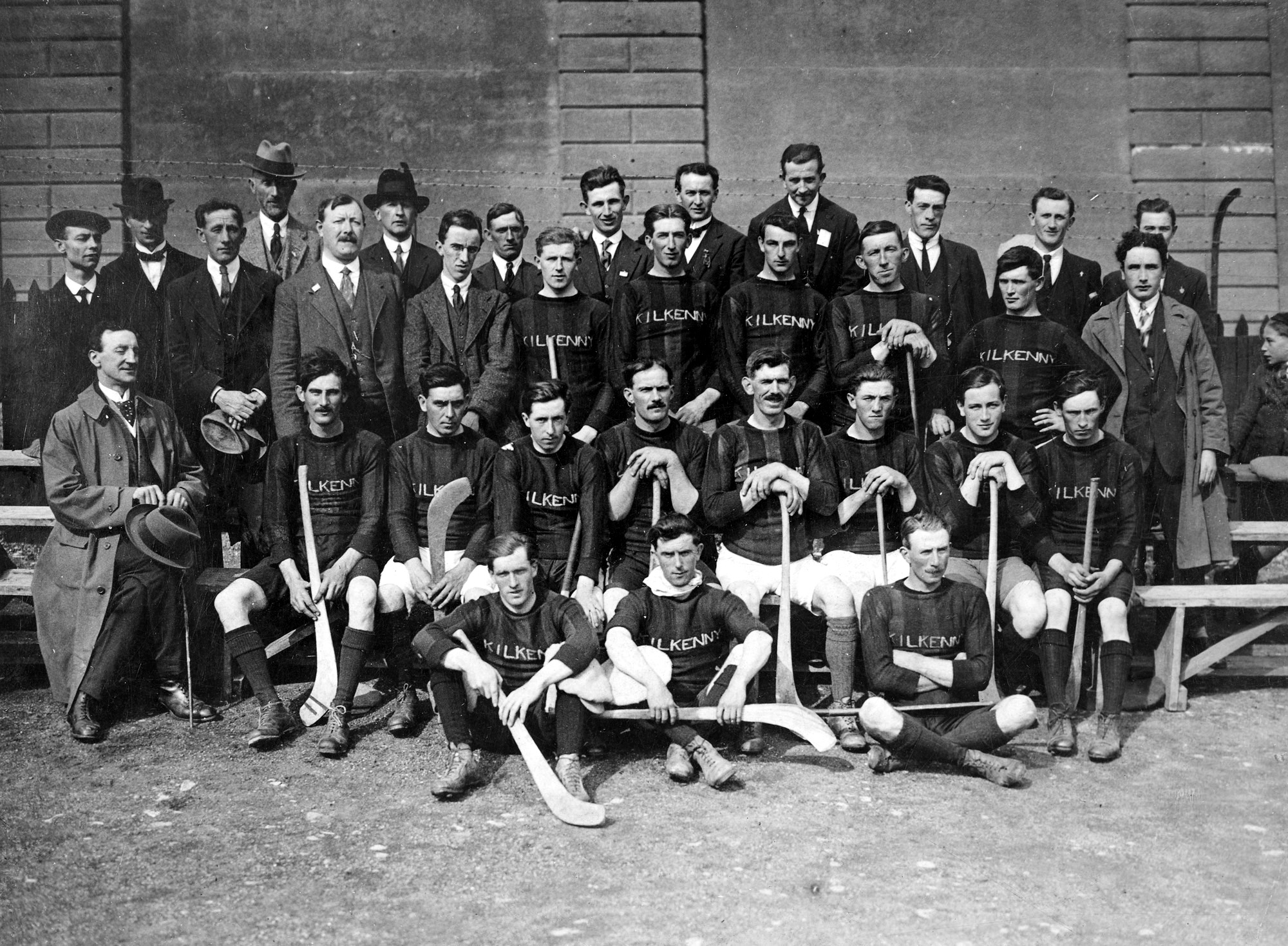
Kilkenny hurling team of 1923

Kilkenny won a sixteenth Leinster SHC title in 1922 before meeting Tipperary in the 1922 All-Ireland SHC final. Tipperary had a three-point lead with three minutes remaining, but Kilkenny scored two goals to secure victory. It would be 45 years before Kilkenny would beat Tipperary in the championship again. Further Leinster titles soon followed. Kilkenny faced Cork in the 1926 All-Ireland SHC final at a snow-covered Croke Park, with Cork winning.

The 1930s was one of Kilkenny's most successful decades, book-ended by two of the most famous All-Ireland SHC finals of all-time. The 1930s saw Kilkenny compete with Limerick to become "team of the decade". Kilkenny won the Leinster SHC title, before meeting Cork in the 1931 All-Ireland SHC final. At half-time Cork led. However, Kilkenny fought back to secure a draw. The replay saw Lory Meagher give one of his most outstanding displays on the hurling field. Once again Cork led at half-time. However, Kilkenny fought back to force a second draw. Meagher did not play in the third game and Cork won by seven points.

Kilkenny qualified for the 1932 All-Ireland SHC final. The opponent was Clare, surprise winner of the Munster Senior Hurling Championship (SHC). Kilkenny won by a goal to claim a first All-Ireland SHC title in a decade. The following year Kilkenny were in a third successive title decider, this time against Limerick. Once again, the game was a close affair; however, Kilkenny won to seal back-to-back All-Ireland SHC titles.

Kilkenny regained the Leinster SHC title before lining out in the 1935 All-Ireland SHC final, Limerick again the opponent. Kilkenny won a close game by a single point. Kilkenny and Limerick had another match in the 1936 All-Ireland SHC final. Limerick trounced Kilkenny by 5–6 to 1–5. The following year Kilkenny qualified for the 1937 All-Ireland SHC final, a third consecutive decider. The opponent, Tipperary, won by seventeen points. Two years later, Kilkenny qualified for the 1939 All-Ireland SHC final. On the day that the Second World War broke out, Kilkenny played Cork at Croke Park. Both sides were level throughout much of the game, the climax of which was played in a fierce thunderstorm. In the dying seconds, Terry Leahy scored the winning point for Kilkenny. Leahy's team next qualified for the 1940 All-Ireland SHC final, Kilkenny's fifth decider in six years. On this occasion an ageing Limerick team faced an ageing Kilkenny team, but Limerick won.

Forced to withdraw from the championship in the early 1940s because of an outbreak of foot-and-mouth disease in the county, Kilkenny regained the Leinster SHC title in 1943, but lost the 1943 All-Ireland SHC semi-final to Antrim, in the biggest hurling shock of all-time. Two years later, Kilkenny faced Tipperary in the 1945 All-Ireland SHC final. The Munster men led by a large margin at half-time; Kilkenny fought back, but it was not enough to deny Tipp.

Kilkenny qualified for 1946 All-Ireland SHC final, with Cork the opponent. Both sides traded the lead several times during the first half; however, in the second half Cork scored five goals to deny Kilkenny for a second consecutive decider. A Cork–Kilkenny rematch took place in the 1947 All-Ireland SHC final, a game many describe as the greatest championship decider of all time. Cork aimed to win a sixth All-Ireland SHC title in seven years, while Kilkenny wanted to avoid becoming the first team to lose three consecutive All-Ireland SHC finals. While Kilkenny led for much of the game, Cork scored two late goals that nearly won the match. Terry Leahy again scored the winning point for Kilkenny, to give the county its thirteenth All-Ireland SHC title.

=== 1947–1969: Lean years ===
The 1947 All-Ireland SHC title ushered in a lean period for Kilkenny hurling that lasted for over a decade. Kilkenny did not win another Leinster SHC title until 1950, losing to Tipperary in the 1950 All-Ireland SHC final, as the Munster men completed the second leg of a famous three-in-a-row. Three years later, Kilkenny won the 1953 Leinster SHC title. However, Galway won the 1953 All-Ireland SHC semi-final. Four years later, Kilkenny won the 1957 Leinster SHC title. The subsequent All-Ireland SHC final was the first championship meeting between Kilkenny and Waterford. The men from the Déise led with fifteen minutes left in the match. However, Kilkenny fought back to win by 4–10 to 3–12.

Kilkenny retained the Leinster Cup in 1958, but – in a change to the format of the championship – lost to Tipperary in the 1958 All-Ireland SHC semi-final. A third consecutive Leinster SHC title followed in 1959. However, the 1958 All-Ireland SHC final against Waterford ended in a draw. The replay saw a young Eddie Keher make his debut, though Waterford won the game. Victory in the 1961–62 National Hurling League gave Kilkenny the impetus to win another Leinster SHC title in 1963. Waterford fought back from an 11-point deficit in the 1963 All-Ireland SHC final, but Kilkenny won by two points. Victory in the 1964 Leinster SHC final allowed Kilkenny a straight passage to the 1964 All-Ireland SHC final, with the team ranked as favourite to retain the title. However, Tipperary hammered Kilkenny off the field with a fourteen-point victory. Two years later, Kilkenny won the 1965–66 National Hurling League. This was followed by another Leinster SHC title and an appearance in the 1966 All-Ireland SHC final. Kilkenny, favourite again, faced a youthful Cork side, and lost. Kilkenny won the 1967 Leinster SHC title before lining out in the 1967 All-Ireland SHC final, a fourth decider of the decade. An ageing Tipperary team provided the opposition; however, Kilkenny scored goals at vital times and won the game. This was Kilkenny's first championship victory against Tipperary since 1923.

=== 1969–1979: Team of Keher, Larkin, Skehan... ===
The Kilkenny hurling teams from 1969 until 1975 featured such players as Eddie Keher, Dick O'Hara, Ollie Walsh, Noel Skehan, Frank Cummins, Fan Larkin and Pat Henderson. Kilkenny wrested the Leinster SHC title back from Wexford in 1969 and qualified for the All-Ireland SHC decider against Cork. After 1966's unexpected defeat the Leinster men sought revenge, with the game ending in Kilkenny's favour by a scoreline of 2–15 to 2–9. Wexford recaptured the Leinster SHC title in 1970. However, Kilkenny bounced back, with a team that won five consecutive Leinster SHC titles between 1971 and 1975. The team also made five consecutive All-Ireland SHC final appearances during those years, a record which stood until 2011.

Kilkenny faced Tipperary in the 1971 All-Ireland SHC final, the first decider broadcast in colour by RTÉ. Eddie Keher scored a record 2 goals and 11 points; however, he ended on the losing side, Tipperary winning by a scoreline of 5–17 to 5–14. The 1972 All-Ireland SHC final was the only 80-minute decider between Kilkenny and Cork. Cork – having been in firm control of the second half and eight points ahead – lost the game by seven points, a fifteen-point turnaround. Kilkenny qualified for the 1973 All-Ireland SHC final, meeting Limerick at that stage for the first time since 1940. Injury, illness and emigration saw a depleted Kilkenny team lose its status as the All-Ireland SHC title holder. A rematch in the 1974 All-Ireland SHC final led to a Kilkenny win. Limerick acquired an early lead, but Kilkenny's goal power secured a 12-point win. In the 1975 All-Ireland SHC final, Kilkenny met a Galway side that had defeated Cork in the All-Ireland SHC semi-final. Galway led at half-time; the Kilkenny men fought back and secured another 12-point victory.

By the time Kilkenny won its next Leinster SHC title in 1978, the great team of the early 1970s was breaking up. An ageing Kilkenny side was unable to compete in the 1978 All-Ireland SHC final with a Cork team that won its third consecutive title. 1979 saw an injection of new blood into the team, and Kilkenny won a seventh Leinster SHC title of the decade. Kilkenny then met – and defeated – Galway in the 1979 All-Ireland SHC final, one of the least memorable finals of the decade.

=== 1979–1998: The 'double-double' ===
The early 1980s saw Offaly emerge as a new force in Leinster. Kilkenny fought back by winning the 1981–82 National Hurling League and 1982 Leinster SHC titles. Christy Heffernan's two goals in a 40-second spell gave Kilkenny a victory over Cork in the subsequent All-Ireland SHC final. In 1983, Kilkenny completed what they call 'the double-double', winning back-to-back League, Leinster and All-Ireland SHC honours. Kilkenny once again defeated Cork in the 1983 All-Ireland SHC final. But expectations of winning three consecutive titles were dashed in the 1984 Leinster SHC.

Two years later, Kilkenny won the 1985–86 National Hurling League, before reclaiming the 1986 Leinster SHC title from Offaly, although the team lost to Galway in the 1986 All-Ireland SHC semi-final. 1987 saw Kilkenny retain the Leinster SHC title, before lining out in that year's All-Ireland SHC decider, where Galway won a low-scoring encounter. The next three years saw Kilkenny once again cast out into the hurling wilderness. Former goalkeeper Ollie Walsh took over as manager at the turn of the decade. The 1989–90 National Hurling League title was followed by the 1990 Leinster SHC title and an appearance in the 1991 All-Ireland SHC final, Tipperary defeating Kilkenny, twenty years on from their previous meeting, to win the title. Kilkenny retained the Leinster SHC title in 1992, before lining out against Cork in the 1992 All-Ireland SHC final. Though playing into a strong wind in the first half, the team emerged as winner by a scoreline of 3–10 to 1–12. A third consecutive Leinster SHC title followed in 1993, before a third consecutive All-Ireland final appearance. On that occasion Kilkenny retained the Liam MacCarthy Cup by a margin of five points.

Offaly and Wexford dominated the Leinster SHC for the next four years, though Kilkenny won the 1994–95 National Hurling League title.

Nickey Brennan managed the Kilkenny senior hurlers for two seasons in the mid-1990s. His successor Kevin Fennelly led his team to a Leinster SHC title in 1998, at the expense of Offaly. But Offaly then defeated Kilkenny in the 1998 All-Ireland SHC final.

=== 1998–2022: Cody era ===
Fennelly, in turn, was succeeded by Brian Cody, one of the most successful managers of the modern era, much of his success due to skill, organisation, work-rate and a never say die attitude.

==== 1999–2003: Another 'double-double' ====
In 1999, Cody guided Kilkenny to a second consecutive Leinster SHC title and a second consecutive All-Ireland SHC final appearance. The opponent was Cork; in atrocious weather conditions, Kilkenny lost. In 2000, Kilkenny eased to another Leinster SHC title and a third successive All-Ireland SHC final. Becoming the first side to lose three successive All-Ireland SHC deciders was again a possibility. Kilkenny ultimately trounced Offaly to take the title. Kilkenny added another Leinster SHC title in 2001, before winning the 2002 National Hurling League title. As Kilkenny began to assert their dominance on the hurling world the team later captured another set of Leinster and All-Ireland SHC titles. In 2003, Kilkenny completed what they call 'the double-double', by winning back-to-back League, Leinster and All-Ireland SHC honours.

==== 2004–2005: Attempt at three successive All-Ireland SHC titles ====
In 2004, Kilkenny aimed to win an elusive third consecutive All-Ireland SHC title. That plan came unstuck in the Leinster SHC when Wexford brought Kilkenny's provincial championship run of success to an end. Kilkenny still advanced to the 2004 All-Ireland SHC final, though Cork won. Cody's team won the 2005 National Hurling League and Leinster SHC titles. However, Galway ended Kilkenny's season with victory in the 2005 All-Ireland SHC semi-final.

==== 2006–2011: "Drive for five" ====
Kilkenny won the 2006 National Hurling League and Leinster SHC titles, retaining both from the previous year. The team then advanced to the 2006 All-Ireland SHC final. Cork – aiming to win three consecutive titles – provided the opposition; Kilkenny won.

In 2007, Kilkenny won an unprecedented ninth Leinster SHC title from ten campaigns. The team qualified for the 2007 All-Ireland SHC final, defeating Limerick to win a thirtieth championship title.

In 2008, Kilkenny won the Leinster SHC title before defeating Waterford in the 2008 All-Ireland SHC final. Later in the year Kilkenny won the All-Ireland Under-21 Hurling Championship. The senior and under-21 titles, combined with the All-Ireland Minor Hurling Championship title and the All-Ireland Intermediate Hurling Championship title (which is broadly a competition for the second string county teams) marked a quadruple. This achievement was unique and was a high point in the dominance of hurling by Kilkenny teams.

In 2009, Kilkenny saw off an emerging Dublin side in the Leinster SHC final thanks to two goals from Martin Comerford. Kilkenny advanced to the 2009 All-Ireland SHC final against Tipperary, a game towards the end of which a controversial penalty was awarded, but Kilkenny won by five points to secure a four-in-a-row. Tipperary mounted a formidable challenge in this final, a contrast to the mis-matches of the previous two years when only token resistance was presented by Limerick and Waterford. Kilkenny became the first team since Cork in the 1940s to complete a four-in-a-row of All-Ireland SHC titles.

The "drive for five" (consecutive All-Ireland SHC titles) got underway in 2010. In 2010, Kilkenny defeated Galway to claim a twelfth Leinster SHC title. Kilkenny advanced to the 2010 All-Ireland SHC final – a rematch with the opponent from the previous year, Tipperary. Lar Corbett bypassed Kilkenny's full-back line with a hat-trick of goals to prevent a fifth consecutive title and a unique piece of hurling championship history. This was Kilkenny's third defeat in an All-Ireland SHC final under Cody's management and Kilkenny's 12th loss in total to Tipperary in the decider.

Kilkenny faced Tipperary in the 2011 All-Ireland SHC final, the third consecutive year this pairing occurred. Kilkenny defeated Tipperary by a scoreline of 2–17 to 1–16.

==== 2012–2022: Cody's last decade ====
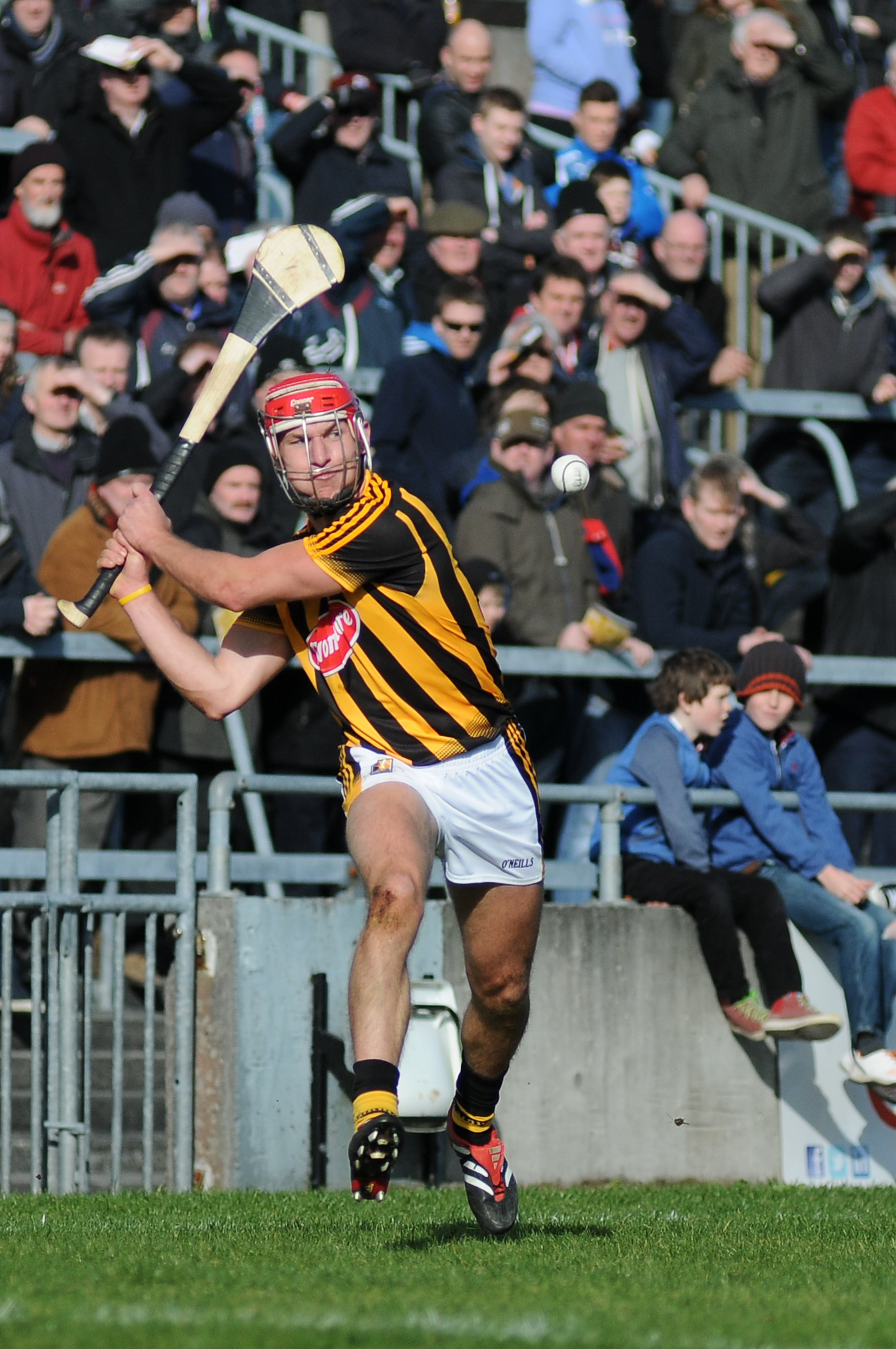
Cillian Buckley in action during a 2015 National Hurling League game against Galway at Pearse Stadium

Galway defeated Kilkenny in the 2012 Leinster SHC final. Kilkenny then defeated Limerick, followed by Tipperary by double scores of 4–24 to 1–15. Kilkenny then met Galway in the 2012 All-Ireland SHC final, and – when Joe Canning scored the last point of the game – he forced a replay (the first since 1959). Kilkenny won the replay by a scoreline of 3–22 to 3–11, a ninth All-Ireland SHC title in 13 seasons.

Kilkenny defeated Tipperary in the 2013 National Hurling League final to secure a 17th title. Kilkenny lost to eventual title winner Dublin in the 2013 Leinster SHC semi-final. The second round of the All-Ireland SHC qualifiers saw Kilkenny paired with Tipperary. This was the first time since the 1937 All-Ireland Senior Hurling Championship final for the teams to play a championshio game outside Croke Park. The hot summer weather contributed to the atmosphere at Nowlan Park, as Kilkenny emerged as the winner. Kilkenny then scraped a victory after extra time against Waterford, before losing to Cork in an All-Ireland SHC quarter-final at Semple Stadium. This was the first time Kilkenny did not play in an All-Ireland SHC semi-final since 1996.

Kilkenny won the 2014 Walsh Cup, the 2014 National Hurling League title, the 2014 Leinster SHC title and a 35th All-Ireland SHC title, with victory in the 2014 All-Ireland SHC final. Brian Cody became the first manager in GAA history to win 10 Senior All-Ireland titles, while Henry Shefflin became the first player in GAA history to win 10 Senior All-Ireland titles. Richie Hogan received the GPA Hurler of the Year award.

Kilkenny won the 2015 Leinster SHC and All-Ireland SHC titles, defeating Galway in the 2015 All-Ireland SHC final. It was Kilkenny's 36th All-Ireland SHC title, as well as an 11th under manager Brian Cody. This was despite a number of high-profile retirements at the end of the previous season.

Kilkenny lost to Tipperary by a scoreline of 2–29 to 2–20 in the 2016 All-Ireland SHC final. During Cody's time in charge, Kilkenny had never conceded a score as high as Tipperary's 2–29 (35 points).

Kilkenny won the 2017 Walsh Cup, then Davy Fitzgerald's Wexford ended Kilkenny's participation in the 2017 National Hurling League at the quarter-final stage. The 2017 Leinster SHC semi-final was Wexford's first championship victory over Kilkenny since 2004. Kilkenny then played Waterford in the second round of the 2017 All-Ireland SHC qualifiers, and – after a period of extra time – Waterford won the game. It was Waterford's first championship defeat of Kilkenny since the 1959 All-Ireland SHC final replay.

Kilkenny played Wexford in the 2018 Walsh Cup final, a game which ended in a first ever free scoring competition, which Wexford narrowly won. Kilkenny defeated Tipperary by a scoreline of 2–23 to 2–17 in a 2018 National Hurling League final contest. Then came the newly formed round robin 2018 Leinster SHC, with Kilkenny qualifying for a Leinster SHC final meeting with Galway. Galway defeated Kilkenny after a replay at Semple Stadium in Thurles. The following week Kilkenny met the soon to be All-Ireland SHC title winner Limerick. Eoin Murphy in goal kept Kilkenny in the game with his blocking skills. A Richie Hogan goal late in the second half looked to have turned the game in Kilkenny's favour, but it was Limerick's young team who finished the game with a victory by a scoreline of 0–27 to 1-22.

Kilkenny did not advance to the knockout stages of the 2019 National Hurling League. The team finished top of the 2019 Leinster SHC round robin, and with that came a 2019 Leinster SHC final appearance against Wexford. Kilkenny lost by a scoreline of 1–23 to 0–23. Kilkenny then defeated Cork and All-Ireland SHC title holder Limerick in the quarter- and semi-final respectively. There followed the 2019 All-Ireland SHC final against Tipperary, whose returning 2010 management team (led by Liam Sheedy) hammered Kilkenny by a scoreline of 3–25 to 0-20.

Kilkenny qualified for the 2022 All-Ireland SHC final but lost, giving Limerick three consecutive All-Ireland SHC titles.

On the afternoon of 23 July 2022, Cody's resignation as manager was announced. He had been in the role for 24 years.

=== 2022–: After Cody ===
The Kilkenny County Board ratified Derek Lyng as Kilkenny senior hurling team manager on the night of 4 August 2022.

The Kilkenny team bus driver was involved in an altercation with a traffic warden before a 2025 National Hurling League game away to Wexford. Though it was reported at the time that the driver had been issued with a parking ticket during the incident on Abbey Street in Wexford, the deputy chief executive of Wexford County Council clarified more than a month afterwards – amid strong criticism of the traffic warden – that no ticket had been given.

== Rivalries ==
- Galway–Kilkenny hurling rivalry
- Kilkenny–Tipperary hurling rivalry
- Cork–Kilkenny hurling rivalry
- Kilkenny–Wexford hurling rivalry
- Kilkenny–Limerick hurling rivalry
- Kilkenny-Offaly hurling rivalry
- Kilkenny–Waterford hurling rivalry
- Clare–Kilkenny hurling rivalry

== Panel ==
Team as per Kilkenny vs Clare in the All-Ireland SHC semi-final, July 2024

No.	Player	Position	Club
1	Eoin Murphy	Goalkeeper	Glenmore
2	Tommy Walsh	Right corner-back	Tullaroan
3	Huw Lawlor	Full-back	O'Loughlin Gaels
4	Paddy Deegan	Left corner-back	O'Loughlin Gaels
5	Mikey Butler	Right half-back	O'Loughlin Gaels
6	David Blanchfield	Centre-back	Bennettsbridge
7	Michael Carey	Left half-back	Young Irelands
8	Cian Kenny	Midfield	James Stephens
9	Richie Reid	Midfield	Ballyhale Shamrocks
10	Adrian Mullen	Right half-forward	Ballyhale Shamrocks
11	John Donnelly (c)	Centre-forward	Thomastown
12	Billy Ryan	Left half-forward	Graigue-Ballycallan
13	Eoin Cody	Right corner-forward	Ballyhale Shamrocks
14	T. J. Reid	Full-forward	Ballyhale Shamrocks
15	Martin Keoghan	Left corner-forward	Tullaroan

No.	Player	Position	Club
16	Aidan Tallis	Substitute	Lisdowney
17	Shane Murphy	Substitute	Glenmore
18	Jordan Molloy	Substitute	O'Loughlin Gaels
19	Conor Delaney	Substitute	Erin's Own
20	Cillian Buckley	Substitute	Dicksboro
21	Conor Fogarty	Substitute	Erin's Own
22	Tom Phelan	Substitute	Conahy Shamrocks
23	Walter Walsh	Substitute	Tullogher-Rosbercon
24	Owen Wall	Substitute	O'Loughlin Gaels
25	Conor Heary	Substitute	O'Loughlin Gaels
26	Gearóid Dunne	Substitute	Tullaroan

^{INJ} Player has had an injury which has affected recent involvement with the county team.
^{RET} Player has since retired from the county team.
^{WD} Player has since withdrawn from the county team due to a non-injury issue.

2022 new Kilkenny players

Goalkeepers

- Liam Dunphy (Lisdowney)

Defenders/midfielders

- Mikey Butler (O'Loughlin Gaels)
- James Burke (Thomastown)
- Niall MacMahon (Erin's Own)
- David Blanchfield (Bennettsbridge)
- Conor Heary (O'Loughlin Gaels)
- Shane Murphy (Glenmore)
- Niall Brassil (James Stephens)
- Niall Brennan (Lisdowney)
- Tomás Dunne (Tullaroan)

Forwards

- Colm Prenderville (Graigue Ballycallan)
- Emmet Landy (Windgap)
- Sean Morrissey (Bennettsbridge)
- Chris Bolger (Clara)
- Shane Walsh (Tullaroan)
- Matt Kenny (Clara)
- Cian Kenny (James Stephens)
- John Walsh (Mullinavat)

Substitutes (used, non playing etc.)

- Darragh O'Keeffe (Thomastown)
- Aaron Brennan (Lisdowney)
- Eoin O'Shea (O'Loughlin Gaels)
- Stephen Donnelly (Thomastown)
- Robbie Buckley (O'Loughlin Gaels)
- Evan Cody (Dicksboro)
- Tadhg O'Dwyer (James Stephens)

Team as per Kilkenny vs Dublin in the fourth round National Hurling League, 5 March 2022

2023 new Kilkenny players

Goalkeepers

- Aidan Tallis (Lisdowney)

Defenders/midfielders

- Niall Rowe (Dicksboro)
- Niall Mullins (James Stephens)
- Des Dunne (Danesfort)
- Peter McDonald (Thomastown)

Forwards

- Ian Byrne (Glenmore)
- Billy Drennan (Galmoy)

Substitutes (used, non playing etc.)

- Pádraic Moylan (Dicksboro)
- Bill Sheehan (Dicksboro)
- Paul Cody (Clara)
- Daire O'Neill (Danesfort)
- Shane Staunton (Clara)
- Gearóid Dunne (Tullaroan)

2025 new Kilkenny players

Defenders

- Zach Bay Hammond (Thomastown)
- Peter Connellan (Thomastown)
- Killian Doyle (Emeralds)

Forwards

- Harry Shine (Dicksboro)
- Luke Connellan (Thomastown)
- Fionan MacKessy (O'Loughlin Gaels)
- Owen Wall (O'Loughlin Gaels)
- Jordan Molloy (O'Loughlin Gaels)
- Niall Shortall (Shamrocks Ballyhale)

== Management team ==
- Manager: Derek Lyng (Emeralds), announced for a three-year term on 4 August 2022
- Selectors: Peter Barry (James Stephens)
- Other backroom: Michael Rice (Carrickshock), Peter O'Donovan, Conor Phelan
- Strength and conditioning coaches: Mickey Comerford and John Murphy

== Managerial history ==
Kilkenny — like Cork and Tipperary — traditionally appoints managers from inside, rather than seeking a "foreign" appointment.

Dates	Name	Origin	Provincial titles	National titles
1957–1978	Fr Tommy Maher	Castle Rovers, Thomastown	14	7
1978–1980	Pat Henderson	Fenians, Johnstown	1	1
1978–1980	Eddie Keher	Rower-Inistioge	1	1
1980–1981	Phil Larkin	Clann na nGael, James Stephens	—N/a	—N/a
1981–1987	Pat Henderson (2)	Fenians, Johnstown	3	2
1987–1988	Eddie Keher (2)	Rower-Inistioge	—N/a	—N/a
1988–1990	Dermot Healy	Clann na nGael, James Stephens	—N/a	—N/a
1990–1995	Ollie Walsh	Thomastown	1991 Leinster Senior Hurling Championship, 1992 Leinster Senior Hurling Championship, 1993 Leinster Senior Hurling Championship	1992 All-Ireland Senior Hurling Championship, 1993 All-Ireland Senior Hurling Championship
1995–1997	Nickey Brennan	Conahy	—N/a	—N/a
1997–1998	Kevin Fennelly	Ballyhale	1998 Leinster Senior Hurling Championship	—N/a
1998–2022	Brian Cody	James Stephens	18	11
2022–2026	Derek Lyng	Emeralds	3	—N/a

== Players ==
=== Notable players ===
- Paddy Buggy
- Eddie Keher
- Jim Langton
- Liam 'Chunky' O'Brien
- Lory Meagher
- Jimmy Walsh
- Paddy Phelan
- Paddy Larkin
- Ollie Walsh
- Pa Dillon
- Phil Larkin
- Pat Henderson
- Ger Fennelly
- Noel Skehan
- Frank Cummins
- Joe Hennessy
- Liam Fennelly
- Willie O'Connor
- D. J. Carey
- Charlie Carter
- Peter Barry
- Henry Shefflin
- Martin Comerford
- Noel Hickey
- Michael Kavanagh
- Eddie Brennan
- J. J. Delaney
- Derek Lyng
- Tommy Walsh
- James 'Cha' Fitzpatrick
- Richie Power Snr
- Richie Power Jnr
- Jackie Tyrrell
- Philly Larkin
- Eoin Larkin
- John Tennyson
- Eddie O'Connor
- Michael Walsh
- James McGarry
- P. J. Ryan
- Aidan Fogarty
- Brian Hogan
- Michael Fennelly
- T. J. Reid
- Richie Hogan
- Paul Murphy
- Colin Fennelly
- Padraig Walsh
- Cillian Buckley
- Walter Walsh

=== Records ===
- All-time top scorer All-Ireland Senior Hurling Championship (2023-): T.J. Reid – 30–551 (641 pts)
- All-time top scorer All-Ireland Senior Hurling Championship (2010–2021): Henry Shefflin – 27–484 (565 pts)
- Last outfield hurler to play without a helmet in All-Ireland SHC final: Michael Kavanagh in 2009

==== Most All-Ireland SHC medals ====
All-Ireland SHC winners
Medals	Players
10	Henry Shefflin
9	J. J. Delaney (1 as a sub), Noel Hickey (1 as a sub), Tommy Walsh (2 as a sub), Jackie Tyrrell (2 as a sub), Noel Skehan (3 as a sub)
8	Eddie Brennan, Eoin Larkin, Richie Power Jnr, Frank Cummins (1 as a sub), Michael Kavanagh (1 as a sub), Michael Fennelly (2 as a sub), Aidan Fogarty (3 as a sub)
7	Dick Doyle, Jack Rochford, Dick Walsh, Sim Walton, T.J. Reid (1 as a sub), Richie Hogan (2 as a sub), Brian Hogan (2 as a sub), P. J. Ryan (4 as a sub)
6	Martin Comerford, Ned Doyle, Paddy Lanigan, Matt Gargan, Eddie Keher, Jimmy Kelly, Dan Kennedy, Derek Lyng, James McGarry (1 as a sub), John Tennyson (3 as a sub), James Ryall (4 as a sub)
5	D. J. Carey, Dick Doherty, Mick Doyle, Dick Grace, Pat Henderson, Jack Keoghan, Phil 'Fan' Larkin, Matty Power (1 w/ Dublin), Richie Mullally (2 as a sub), James 'Cha' Fitzpatrick (2 as a sub), Nickey Brennan (3 as a sub), David Herity (3 as a sub), Billy Fitzpatrick
4	J. J. Brennan, Martin Coogan, Mick Crotty, Christy Heffernan, Paddy Larkin, Paddy Moran, Liam 'Chunky' O'Brien, Paddy Phelan, John Power, John T. Power, Jim Treacy, Jimmy Walsh, Ollie Walsh, Paul Murphy, Colin Fennelly

=== All Stars ===
Kilkenny has 198 All Stars, as of 16 November 2023.

- Cú Chulainn Awards 22
  - 1963 (3), 1964 (7), 1965 (1), 1966 (4), 1967 (7)
- GAA All Stars Awards 200
  - 1971 (4), 1972 (6), 1973 (7), 1974 (7), 1975 (6), 1976 (3), 1978 (3), 1979 (4), 1982 (8), 1983 (9), 1984 (2), 1985 (1), 1986 (1), 1987 (3), 1990 (1), 1991 (2), 1992 (7), 1993 (6), 1994 (1), 1995 (1), 1997 (3), 1998 (2), 1999 (4), 2000 (9), 2001 (1), 2002 (7), 2003 (8), 2004 (3), 2005 (2), 2006 (6), 2007 (6), 2008 (9), 2009 (6), 2010 (5), 2011 (8), 2012 (5), 2014 (6), 2015 (7), 2016 (4), 2018 (1), 2019 (3), 2020 (1), 2021 (1), 2022 (4), 2023 (5), 2025 (2)

All Star winners
Awards	Players
11	Henry Shefflin
9	Tommy Walsh, D. J. Carey, Eddie Keher (5 All Star, 4 Cú Chulainn)
7	T. J. Reid, J. J. Delaney, Noel Skehan
5	Joe Hennessy, Ger Henderson
4	Phil 'Fan' Larkin, Liam 'Chunky' O'Brien, Frank Cummins, Liam Fennelly, Willie O'Connor, Michael Kavanagh, Eddie Brennan, Jackie Tyrrell, Paul Murphy, Richie Hogan, Eoin Murphy

Hurler of the Year winners
Award	Players
Texaco HOTY	Séamus Cleere (1963), Ollie Walsh (1967), Ted Carroll (1969), Eddie Keher (1972), Pat Henderson (1974), Liam 'Chunky' O'Brien (1975), Ger Henderson (1979), Noel Skehan (1982), Frank Cummins (1983), D. J. Carey (1993, 2000), Henry Shefflin (2002, 2006, 2012), J. J. Delaney (2003), Eoin Larkin (2008), Tommy Walsh (2009), Michael Fennelly (2011)
All-Stars HOTY	D. J. Carey – 2000, Henry Shefflin – 2002, J. J. Delaney – 2003, Henry Shefflin – 2006, Eoin Larkin – 2008, Tommy Walsh – 2009, Michael Fennelly - 2011, Henry Shefflin - 2012, Richie Hogan - 2014, T. J. Reid - 2015

=== Team of the Century ===
From 2000:

- 1 Ollie Walsh
- 2 Phil 'Fan' Larkin
- 3 Pa Dillon
- 4 Dick O'Hara
- 5 Joe Hennessy
- 6 Pat Henderson
- 7 Paddy Phelan
- 8 Lory Meagher
- 9 Frank Cummins
- 10 Jim Langton
- 11 John Power
- 12 D. J. Carey
- 13 Billy Fitzpatrick
- 14 Christy Heffernan
- 15 Eddie Keher

== Team records ==
- Most All-Ireland Senior Hurling Championship titles: 36
- Longest unbeaten Hurling Championship run: 21 games (10 June 2006 to 8 August 2010)
- Highest score in All-Ireland Senior Hurling Championship final: 3–30 (2008 v Waterford) [tied Cork 1970]
- Most National Hurling League titles: 19 [tied with Tipperary]
- Most All-Ireland Under-21 Hurling Championship titles: 12 [tied with Cork]
- Most All-Ireland Minor Hurling Championship titles: 21 [tied with Tipperary]
- Most Provincial Senior Hurling Championship titles: 76
- Most Provincial Intermediate Hurling Championship titles: 17
- Most Provincial Under-21/Under-20 Hurling Championship titles: 28
- Most Provincial Minor Hurling Championship titles: 61
- Most GAA All Stars Awards: 193

== Honours ==
=== National ===
- All-Ireland Senior Hurling Championship
  - (gold) Winners (36): 1904, 1905, 1907, 1909, 1911, 1912, 1913, 1922, 1932, 1933, 1935, 1939, 1947, 1957, 1963, 1967, 1969, 1972, 1974, 1975, 1979, 1982, 1983, 1992, 1993, 2000, 2002, 2003, 2006, 2007, 2008, 2009, 2011, 2012, 2014, 2015
  - (silver) Runners-up (29): 1893, 1895, 1897, 1898, 1916, 1926, 1931, 1936, 1937, 1940, 1945, 1946, 1950, 1959, 1964, 1966, 1971, 1973, 1978, 1987, 1991, 1998, 1999, 2004, 2010, 2016, 2019, 2022, 2023
- National Hurling League
  - (gold) Winners (19): 1932–33, 1961–62, 1965–66, 1975–76, 1981–82, 1982–83, 1985–86, 1989–90, 1994–95, 2002, 2003, 2005, 2006, 2009, 2012, 2013, 2014, 2018, 2021 (shared)
  - (silver) Runners-up (13): 1946–47, 1949–50, 1953–54, 1956–57, 1964–65, 1966–67, 1967–68, 1976–77, 1977–78, 2007, 2011, 2023, 2024
- All-Ireland Intermediate Hurling Championship
  - (gold) Winners (5): 1973, 2008, 2010, 2016, 2017
- All-Ireland Junior Hurling Championship
  - (gold) Winners (9): 1928, 1946, 1951, 1956, 1984, 1986, 1988, 1990, 1995
- All-Ireland Under-21 Hurling Championship
  - (gold) Winners (12): 1974, 1975, 1977, 1984, 1990, 1994, 1999, 2003, 2004, 2006, 2008, 2022
- All-Ireland Minor Hurling Championship
  - (gold) Winners (21): 1931, 1935, 1936, 1950, 1960, 1961, 1962, 1972, 1973, 1975, 1977, 1981, 1988, 1990, 1991, 1993, 2002, 2003, 2008, 2010, 2014
- All-Ireland Vocational Schools Championship
  - (gold) Winners (8): 1963, 1972, 1973, 1975, 1976, 1977, 1989, 1991

=== Provincial ===
- Leinster Senior Hurling Championship
  - (gold) Winners (77): 1888, 1893, 1895, 1897, 1898, 1900, 1903, 1904, 1905, 1907, 1909, 1911, 1912, 1913, 1916, 1922, 1923, 1925, 1926, 1931, 1932, 1933, 1935, 1936, 1937, 1939, 1940, 1943, 1945, 1946, 1947, 1950, 1953, 1957, 1958, 1959, 1963, 1964, 1966, 1967, 1969, 1971, 1972, 1973, 1974, 1975, 1978, 1979, 1982, 1983, 1986, 1987, 1991, 1992, 1993, 1998, 1999, 2000, 2001, 2002, 2003, 2005, 2006, 2007, 2008, 2009, 2010, 2011, 2014, 2015, 2016, 2020, 2021, 2022, 2023, 2024, 2025
  - (silver) Runners-up (31): 1896, 1902, 1906, 1908, 1914, 1917, 1919, 1920, 1921, 1927, 1934, 1938, 1941, 1942, 1949, 1955, 1956, 1960, 1962, 1965, 1968, 1970, 1976, 1977, 1980, 1989, 1995, 1997, 2012, 2018, 2019
- Kehoe Cup:
  - (gold) Winners (1): 1980
- Walsh Cup
  - (gold) Winners (20): 1955, 1957, 1958, 1959, 1961, 1962, 1963, 1970, 1973, 1974, 1988, 1989, 1992, 2005, 2006, 2007, 2009, 2012, 2014, 2017
- Walsh Shield Cup
  - (gold) Winners (1): 2026
- Leinster Intermediate Hurling Championship
  - (gold) Winners (17): 1967, 1973, 1997, 1998, 1999, 2000, 2003, 2004, 2006, 2008, 2009, 2010, 2011, 2012, 2013, 2016, 2017
- Leinster Junior Hurling Championship
  - (gold) Winners (25): 1909, 1911, 1913, 1916, 1928, 1930, 1935, 1939, 1941, 1946, 1949, 1951, 1956, 1958, 1983, 1984, 1986, 1988, 1989, 1990, 1991, 1993, 1994, 1995, 1996
- Leinster Under-21 Hurling Championship
  - (gold) Winners (28): 1968, 1974, 1975, 1976, 1977, 1980, 1981, 1982, 1984, 1985, 1988, 1990, 1993, 1994, 1995, 1998, 1999, 2003, 2004, 2005, 2006, 2008, 2009, 2012, 2017, 2019, 2022, 2025
- Leinster Minor Hurling Championship
  - (gold) Winners (61): 1930, 1931, 1932, 1933, 1935, 1936, 1937, 1939, 1942, 1948, 1949, 1950, 1951, 1955, 1956, 1957, 1958, 1959, 1960, 1961, 1962, 1969, 1971, 1972, 1973, 1974, 1975, 1976, 1977, 1978, 1979, 1981, 1982, 1984, 1988, 1990, 1991, 1992, 1993, 1994, 1995, 1996, 1997, 1998, 1999, 2001, 2002, 2003, 2004, 2006, 2008, 2009, 2010, 2013, 2014, 2015, 2017, 2020, 2021, 2024, 2025

=== Other ===
- Players Champions Cup
  - (gold) Winners (1): 2019
