= 1975 All-Ireland Senior Football Championship final =

- Event: 1975 All-Ireland Senior Football Championship
Kerry	Dublin
2–12 (18)	0–11 (11)
- Date: 28 September 1975
- Venue: Croke Park, Dublin
- Referee: John Moloney (Tipperary)
- Attendance: 66,346

The 1975 All-Ireland Senior Football Championship final was the 88th All-Ireland Final and the deciding match of the 1975 All-Ireland Senior Football Championship, an inter-county Gaelic football tournament for the top teams in Ireland.

This was one of six All-Ireland SFC finals contested by both Dublin and Kerry between 1974 and 1986, a period when one of either team always contested the decider.

== Pre-match ==
On the train to Dublin, Kerry manager Mick O'Dwyer and his players spoke to journalists. Jim Farrelly quoted O'Dwyer in the Sunday Independent as advocating a marriage ban for his players. "Marriage puts players back in their game". Kerry player Jimmy Deenihan was photographed during the train trip alongside his sister Patricia and said to Farrelly: "Four of us [Kerry players] are PE teachers. Saying 'no' to girls and drink and high Kerry social life has been hard!".

== Match ==
This year's final was played on 28 September.

=== Summary ===
The Kerry captain was Mickey "Ned" O'Sullivan.

John Egan and substitute Ger O'Driscoll scored goals for a win.

The train journey described above challenged the perception that Kerry had entered the match as inexperienced. Before the match, Dublin were the betting favorites at 4/5, while Kerry were listed at 5/4 odds.

This was the second of four All-Ireland SFC titles won by Kerry in the 1970s.

Séamus McCarthy, aged 21 and later a Tipperary footballer, and his 50-year-old father Eddie McCarthy, became the first father-and-son pair to umpire at an All-Ireland final, doing so at the Hill 16 end of Croke Park.

=== Details ===
28 September 1975; Final	Kerry	2–12 – 0–11	Dublin	Croke Park, Dublin; Attendance: 66,346; Referee: John Moloney (Tipperary)
28 September 1975; Final	M Sheehy 0–4, G O'Driscoll 1–0, J Egan 1–0, P Spillane 0–3, B Lynch 0–3, D Moran 0–2		J Keaveney 0–6, P Gogarty 0–2, B Doyle 0–1, B Pocock 0–1, B Mullins 0–1	Croke Park, Dublin; Attendance: 66,346; Referee: John Moloney (Tipperary)

Kerry
Dublin

Kerry

- 1 Paudie O'Mahony
- 2 Ger O'Keeffe
- 3 John O'Keeffe
- 4 Jimmy Deenihan
- 5 Páidí Ó Sé
- 6 Tim Kennelly
- 7 Ger Power
- 8 Paudie Lynch
- 9 Pat McCarthy
- 10 Brendan Lynch
- 11 Denis "Ogie" Moran
- 12 Mickey "Ned" O'Sullivan (c)
- 13 John Egan
- 14 Mikey Sheehy
- 15 Pat Spillane

Sub used
17 Ger O'Driscoll for M. O'Sullivan

Subs not used
16 John Bunyan
18 John Long
19 Batt O'Shea
20 Donie O'Sullivan
21 Jackie Walsh

Manager
Mick O'Dwyer

Dublin

- 1 Paddy Cullen
- 2 Gay O'Driscoll
- 3 Seán Doherty (c)
- 4 Robbie Kelleher
- 5 Paddy Reilly
- 6 Alan Larkin
- 7 Georgie Wilson
- 8 Brian Mullins
- 9 Bernard Brogan Snr
- 10 Anton O'Toole
- 11 Tony Hanahoe
- 12 David Hickey
- 13 John McCarthy
- 14 Jimmy Keaveney
- 15 Paddy Gogarty

Subs used
17 Bobby Doyle for B. Brogan
18 Pat O'Neill for J. McCarthy
19 Brendan Pocock for P. Reilly

Subs not used
16 Les Deegan
19 Stephen Rooney
20 Kevin Synnott
21 Jim Brogan
22 Fran Ryder
23 Liam Egan
24 Martin Noctorr

Manager
Kevin Heffernan

== Legacy ==
According to Dermot Crowe, writing 50 years later in the Sunday Independent: "It can be argued with some validity that the '75 final was one of the most important Gaelic football games of all time, because of what it started and the impact it had on so many lives, far beyond Kerry and Dublin".

The players involved in the game organised a golden jubilee reunion in 2025.
