= Clare–Kilkenny hurling rivalry =

Rivalry between two Irish county teams

Clare-Kilkenny
- Location: County Clare; County Kilkenny
- Teams: Clare; Kilkenny
- First meeting: 4 September 1932; Kilkenny 3-3 - 2-3 Clare; 1932 All-Ireland final
- Latest meeting: 2 July 2024; Clare 0-24 - 2-16 Kilkenny; 2024 All-Ireland semi-final

Statistics
- Total meetings: 10
- Top scorer: Henry Shefflin (2-35)
- All-time series: Clare: 2 Drawn: 1 Kilkenny: 7
- Largest victory: 02 July 2022; Kilk. 2-26 - 0-20 Clare; 2022 All-Ireland semi-final

The Clare-Kilkenny rivalry is a hurling rivalry between Irish county teams Clare and Kilkenny, who first played each other in 1932. The fixture has been an irregular one due to both teams playing in separate provinces. Kilkenny's home ground is Nowlan Park and Clare's home ground is Cusack Park, however, all of their championship meetings have been held at neutral venues, usually Croke Park.

While Kilkenny are regarded as one of the "big three" of hurling, with Cork and Tipperary completing the trio, Clare are ranked joined seventh in the all-time roll of honour and have enjoyed sporadic periods of success at various stages throughout the history of the championship. The two teams have won a combined total of 41 All-Ireland Senior Hurling Championship titles.

As of 2025, Clare and Kilkenny have met ten times in the hurling championship including meeting twice at the All Ireland final stage. Clare have recorded just two defeats of Kilkenny in all of those meetings.

== History ==
=== 1932: Inaugural clash ===
The very first meeting of Clare and Kilkenny in the championship took place on 4 September 1932 to decide the destination of the All-Ireland title. Kilkenny were the All-Ireland runners-up the previous year while Clare were appearing in their first decider since 1914. The coverage that the Irish Press afforded to the three-game saga between Cork and Kilkenny the previous year is credited with turning hurling into a mass spectator sport and, as a partial result of this, a then record crowd of 34,372 packed Croke Park for the 1932 decider. Clare scored the first point of the match from Jack Gleeson while it took Kilkenny thirteen minutes to equalize. At the interval it was Clare who held a narrow 0–3 to 0–2 lead. The second half saw Kilkenny go on numerous goal hunts. Matty Power bagged two while Lory Meagher scored a third to give Kilkenny an eight-point lead. Tull Considine replied with two goals for Clare. The final result hinged on an incident two minutes from the end when Clare's goal-scorer Tull Considine was, according to himself, pushed in the back when shooting for a third goal from little more than ten metres. Kilkenny went on to win by 3–3 to 2–3.

=== 1997-1999: Clare's golden years ===
After an absence of sixty-five years, Clare and Kilkenny renewed their rivalry on 10 August 1997 in the All-Ireland semi-final. Ger Loughnane's Clare were at their peak during this time while Kilkenny were going through a period of transition and had worked their way through the new "back door" system. "The Cats" were hit in advance of the match by the withdrawal of Michael Phelan and Liam Simpson. The final quarter showed both teams at their best. Apparently gone, Kilkenny trailed by seven points but a glorious solo goal by D. J. Carey cut the margin. Carey was brought into the game much more after this goal, however, after being switched to mark Frank Lohan the Kilkenny forward's threat was nullified. The finals core of 1–17 to 1-13 saw Clare record their first and only defeat of Kilkenny.

Two years late on 15 August 1999 it was Clare who had worked their way through the "back door" to face Kilkenny in the All-Ireland semi-final. It was a last hurrah for a Clare team who had brought a new level of fitness to the championship over the previous four championship seasons, while for Kilkenny it was the beginning of their own golden era. There was a sense that the Clare team was in decline but it took a display from Kilkenny to prove it. Clare had hauled themselves back into contention after a goal from Stephen McNamara at the start of the final quarter but three minutes later, DJ Carey effectively closed the book with a fine goal of his own. The final score of 2–14 to 1-13 sent Kilkenny into the All-Ireland final, while it effectively brought the curtain down of Clare's era.

=== 2002: A second All-Ireland final meeting ===
On 9 September 2002 Clare and Kilkenny clashed for the fourth time in all and for the second time in an All-Ireland final. Clare became the first team to face a first-round provincial defeat and maneuver their way through the expanded qualifiers to claim an All-Ireland final berth. Kilkenny, on the other hand, were hoping to claim a second title in three years. All did not go to plan for Clare as they were 1–2 to no score in arrears after just six minutes. Henry Shefflin and D. J. carey fired over 1-6 each from play while they added another 0-7 between them with frees. A final score of 2–20 to 0-19 gave Kilkenny their 27th All-Ireland title.

=== 2004-2006: Clare fail to halt Kilkenny dominance ===
On 25 July 2004 Clare faced three-in-a-row hopefuls Kilkenny in the All-Ireland quarter-final. Kilkenny's season had been derailed by Wexford in the provincial championship, while Clare looked rejuvenated and a shock result looked likely. An early John Hoyne goal sustained their All-Ireland hopes together with superb defensive play and inspired free-taking from Henry Shefflin. Clare, meanwhile, were continuing to benefit from the strategy of using five forwards and deploying Alan Markham in a sweeper role. Niall Gilligan and Tony Griffin were Clare's star forwards, however, a combination of James McGarry's brilliant goalkeeping and missed chances in the closing minutes resulted in Clare needing a late Jamesie O'Connor free to level the match at 1-13 apiece.

The replay six days later saw Kilkenny explode out of the blocks and go 1–3 to no score ahead after a quarter of an hour courtesy of Eddie Brennan. Clare revived themselves, for a period at least, and prolonged the suspense for the attendance. Helped in large measure by Kilkenny profligacy, they ended the first half strongly, reduced the deficit to four points, and midway through the second half hit two from play in succession to leave only a goal dividing the teams. Kilkenny stepped up a gear in the final ten minutes, scoring 0–4 to Clare's 0–1, two of them from Martin Comerford, and crowned the win with a wonderful score from D. J. Carey, who secured the 1–11 to 0–9 victory.

On 13 August 2006 the seventh championship meeting of Clare and Kilkenny pitted them together in an All-Ireland semi-final. Clare got off to an awful start as Henry Shefflin had goaled from close range and won two frees from Brian Lohan, which he converted himself inside the first five minutes. An Eddie Brennan effort had come back from the woodwork and Derek Lyng had pointed from play. The tide turned eventually with a Niall Gilligan goal for Clare. It was the final curtain call for some of the Clare players who had soldiered since the glory days of 1995 and 1997, as Kilkenny triumphed by 2–21 to 1–16.

== Statistics ==
Team	All-Ireland	Provincial	National League	Total
Kilkenny	35	77	19	131
Clare	5	6	5	16
Combined	40	83	24	147

== All time results ==
=== Legend ===
Kilkenny win
Clare win
Draw

=== Senior ===
No.	Date	Winners	Score	Runners-up	Venue	Competition
1.	4 September 1932	Kilkenny (1)	3-3 - 2-3	Clare	Croke Park	All-Ireland final
2.	10 August 1997	Clare (1)	1-17 - 1-13	Kilkenny	Croke Park	All-Ireland semi-final
3.	16 August 1999	Kilkenny (2)	2-14 - 1-13	Clare	Croke Park	All-Ireland semi-final
4.	8 September 2002	Kilkenny (3)	2-20 - 0-19	Clare	Croke Park	All-Ireland final
5.	25 July 2004	Kilkenny	1-13 - 1-13	Clare	Semple Stadium	All-Ireland quarter-final
6.	31 July 2004	Kilkenny (4)	1-11 - 0-9	Clare	Semple Stadium	All-Ireland quarter-final replay
7.	13 August 2006	Kilkenny (5)	2-21 - 1-16	Clare	Croke Park	All-Ireland semi-final
8.	2 July 2022	Kilkenny (6)	2-26 - 0-20	Clare	Croke Park	All-Ireland semi-final
9.	9 July 2023	Kilkenny (7)	1-25 - 1-22	Clare	Croke Park	All-Ireland semi-final
10.	6 July 2024	Clare (2)	0-24 - 2-16	Kilkenny	Croke Park	All-Ireland semi-final

=== Intermediate ===
No.	Date	Winners	Score	Runners-up	Venue	Competition
1.	27 August 2011	Clare (1)	2-13 - 1-11	Kilkenny	Semple Stadium	All-Ireland final

=== Junior ===
No.	Date	Winners	Score	Runners-up	Venue	Competition
1.	18 September 1949	Clare (1)	3-5 - 3-3	Kilkenny	MacDonagh Park	All-Ireland home final
2.	18 July 1993	Clare (2)	3-10 - 0-8	Kilkenny	Croke Park	All-Ireland final
3.	12 August 1995	Kilkenny (1)	1-20 - 1-6	Clare	Semple Stadium	All-Ireland final

=== Under-21 ===
No.	Date	Winners	Score	Runners-up	Venue	Competition
1.	13 September 2009	Clare (1)	0-15 - 0-14	Kilkenny	Croke Park	All-Ireland final
2.	15 September 2012	Clare (2)	2-17 - 2-11	Kilkenny	Semple Stadium	All-Ireland final

=== Minor ===
No.	Date	Winners	Score	Runners-up	Venue	Competition
1.	5 September 2010	Kilkenny (1)	2-10 - 0-14	Clare	Croke Park	All-Ireland final

== Records ==
=== Scorelines ===
- Biggest championship win:
  - For Clare: Clare 1-17 - 1-13 Kilkenny, 1997 All-Ireland semi-final, Croke Park, 10 August 1997
  - For Kilkenny: Kilkenny 2-21 - 1-16 Clare, 2006 All-Ireland semi-final, Croke Park, 10 August 2006
- Highest aggregate:
  - Kilkenny 2-20 - 0-19 Clare, 2002 All-Ireland final, Croke Park, 8 September 2002

=== Top scorers ===
Team	Player	Score	Total
Clare	Niall Gilligan	2-20	26
Kilkenny	Henry Shefflin	2-35	41

- Top scorer in a single game:
  - For Clare: 1-7
    - Niall Gilligan, Clare 1-13 - 1-13 Kilkenny, All-Ireland quarter-final, Semple Stadium, 25 July 2004
  - For Kilkenny: 1-13
    - Henry Shefflin, Kilkenny 2-21 - 1-16 Clare, 2006 All-Ireland semi-final, Croke Park, 13 August 2006

=== Attendances ===
- Highest attendance:
  - 76,254 - Kilkenny 2-20 - 0-19 Clare, All-Ireland final, Croke Park, 8 September 2002
- Lowest attendance:
  - 29,000 - Clare 1-13 - 1-13 Kilkenny, All-Ireland quarter-final, Semple Stadium, 25 July 2004
