= Dermody =

Dermody is a surname. Notable people with the surname include:

- Clarke Dermody (born 1980), New Zealand rugby union footballer
- Dorothy Dermody (1909–2012), Irish fencer
- Frank Dermody (born 1951), American politician
- Jack Dermody (1910–1990), Australian rules footballer
- Jim Dermody (1898–1975), Irish hurler
- Joe Dermody (born 1972), Irish hurler
- Maeve Dermody (born 1985), Australian actress
- Matt Dermody (born 1990), American baseball player
- Thomas Dermody (1775–1802), Irish poet
- Tom Dermody, American politician
- Warren Dermody

(born 1966), Manchester singer/songwriter
