= Jack Gleeson (disambiguation) =

Jack Gleeson (born 1992) is an Irish actor.

Jack Gleeson may also refer to:

- Jack Gleeson (Tipperary hurler) (1910–1970), Irish hurler
- Jack Gleeson (Dublin hurler) (1903–1948), Irish hurler
- Jack Gleeson (rugby union) (died 1979), New Zealand rugby union coach
- Jack Gleeson (television executive) (1922–2018), Australian television executive

== See also ==
- Jack Gleason, American baseball player
- Jackie Gleason, American actor
