= James McGarry =

James McGarry may refer to:

- James McGarry (hurler)
- James McGarry (footballer)
