= David Blanchfield =

Irish hurler

Personal information
- Native name: Daithí de Bluinsín (Irish)
- Born: 24 April 2000 (age 26) Bennettsbridge, County Kilkenny, Ireland
- Occupation: Student
- Height: 6 ft 3 in (191 cm)

Sport
- Sport: Hurling
- Position: half back
Club
- Years: Club
- 2018-present: Bennettsbridge
Club titles
- Kilkenny titles: 0
College
- Years: College
- DCU Dóchas Éireann
College titles
- Fitzgibbon titles: 0
Inter-county
- Years: County
- 2021-present: Kilkenny
Inter-county titles
- Leinster titles: 3
- All-Irelands: 0
- NHL: 1
- All Stars: 0

David Blanchfield (born 24 April 2000) is an Irish hurler who plays for Kilkenny Senior Championship club Bennettsbridge and at inter-county level with the Kilkenny senior hurling team.

== Career ==
Blanchfield first played hurling at juvenile and underage levels with Bennettsbridge before eventually joining the club's senior team. He also played as a schoolboy with St. Kieran's College and won consecutive All-Ireland titles in 2018 and 2019. Blanchfield first appeared on the inter-county scene as a member of the Kilkenny under-20 hurling team that won the Leinster U20HC title in 2019. He was added to the senior team two years later and, after winning National League and Leinster Championship titles, lined out in the 2022 All-Ireland final defeat by Limerick.

== Honours ==
St. Kieran's College

- All-Ireland Colleges Senior Hurling Championship: 2018, 2019
- Leinster Colleges Senior Hurling Championship: 2019

Kilkenny

- Leinster Senior Hurling Championship: 2021, 2022, 2023
- National Hurling League: 2021
- Leinster Under-20 Hurling Championship: 2019
