= Kilkenny–Limerick hurling rivalry =

Kilkenny-Limerick
- Location: County Kilkenny; County Limerick
- Teams: Kilkenny; Limerick
- First meeting: 30 October 1898; Lim. 3-4 - 2-4 Kilk. 1897 All-Ireland final
- Latest meeting: 23 July 2023; Kil. 2-15 - 0-30 Lim. 2023 All-Ireland Final

Statistics
- Total meetings: 16
- Top scorer: Henry Shefflin (3-17)
- All-time series: Championship: Kilkenny 9-7 Limerick
- Largest victory: 6 September 1936; Lim. 5-6 - 1-5 Kilk. 1936 All-Ireland final

The Kilkenny–Limerick rivalry is a hurling rivalry between Irish county teams Kilkenny and Limerick, who first played each other in 1897. The fixture has been an irregular one due to the teams playing in separate provinces. Kilkenny's home ground is Nowlan Park and Limerick's home ground is the Gaelic Grounds, however, almost all of their championship meetings have been held at neutral venues, usually Croke Park.

While Kilkenny are regarded as one of the "big three" of hurling, with Cork and Tipperary completing the trio, Limerick are ranked fourth in the all-time roll of honour and have enjoyed sporadic periods of dominance at various stages throughout the history of the championship, including currently. The two teams have won a combined total of 47 All-Ireland Senior Hurling Championship titles.

As of 2023 Kilkenny and Limerick had met sixteen times in the hurling championship, including nine encounters in the All Ireland final stage of which Limerick have won six compared to Kilkenny who have won four. On 17 July 2022 they met in the All Ireland final for the first time in 15 years with Limerick prevailing on a scoreline of 1-31 to 2-26 to secure their third successive All Ireland triumph and an 11th overall. On 23 July 2023 Limerick defeated Kilkenny to win A 4th successive All Ireland title, securing their 12th title

== History ==
=== 1897: Inaugural clash ===
The very first meeting of Kilkenny and Limerick took place on 30 October 1898 to decide the destination of the 1897 All-Ireland crown. Both sides were hoping to win the All-Ireland championship for the first time. "The Cats" got off to a great start and led by 2-4 to 1-1 at half-time. Limerick, however, powered on in the second half and used their new technique of hooking. They got two quick goals early in the half and scored the winning goal from a free after fifty-two minutes. At the final whistle Limerick emerged victorious by 3-4 to 2-4. It was Limerick's first All-Ireland title.

=== 1933-1940: Honours even in greatest era ===
On 3 September 1933 the All-Ireland final between Kilkenny and Limerick set a new attendance record when 45,176 spectators turned up at Croke Park to see their first championship clash of the 20th century. Scores were at a premium in the opening half with the sides finishing level at 0-4 apiece at the interval. The exchanges were also keen in the second half, however, the last eight minutes provided an exhibition of power-packed hurling. Matty Power gave Kilkenny a one-point lead before Johnny Dunne scored the clinching goal to secure a 1-7 to 0-6 victory. It was Kilkenny's first championship defeat of Limerick.

Two years later on 1 September 1935 the attendance records tumbled once again when 46,591 to see the champions of 1934 and the reigning champions face off against each other. In spite of rain falling throughout the entire game both sides served up great entertainment. At the beginning of the second-half Lory Meagher sent over a huge point from midfield giving Kilkenny a lead which they would not surrender. The game ended in controversial circumstances for Limerick when they were awarded a close-in free to level the game. Jack Keane issued an instruction from the sideline that Timmy Ryan, the team captain, was to take the free and put the sliotar over the bar for the equalising point. As he lined up to take it, Mick Mackey pushed him aside and took the free himself. The shot dropped short and into the waiting hands of the Kilkenny goalkeeper Jimmy O'Connell and was cleared. The game ended shortly after with Kilkenny triumphing by 2–5 to 2–4.

For the third time in four years Kilkenny and Limerick did battle in the All-Ireland final on 6 September 1936. Once again the records tumbled when the attendance breached 50,000 for the first time ever. Lory Meagher opened the scoring with a Kilkenny point before Jackie Power responded with a goal for Limerick. Johnny Dunne and Paddy McMahon also scored goals later in the half which saw Limerick lead by 2-3 to 1-4 at half-time. Limerick started the second half with a flourish as Dave Clohessy had a goal within three minutes. Clohesst bagged a second four minutes later before Mick Mackey went on a stunning solo run to set up Paddy McMahon for his second and Limerick's fifth goal of the game. The 5-6 to 1-5 victory gave Limerick their second championship victory over Kilkenny.

The All-Ireland final on 1 September 1940 brought Kilkenny and Limerick together for the last great game between the two outstanding teams of the decade. Terry Leahy and Jackie Power exchanged goals in the first half and there was little in it at the intervals as Kilkenny took 1 1-4 to 1-2 lead. Early in the second-half Kilkenny took a four-point lead, however, once Limerick captain Mick Mackey was deployed at midfield he proceeded to dominate the game. Two more goals for Limerick from Dick Stokes and John Mackey clinched a 3-7 to 1-7 victory.

=== 1973-1974: All-Ireland clashes ===
Well, after a wait since nineteen hundred and
forty we have Limerick the All-Ireland champions,
the worthy All-Ireland champions after a truly
memorable game...shades of the past have come
to Croke Park today, as Limerick after so long
have won this title.

— Michael O'Hehir's commentary on RTÉ following
Limerick's triumph in the 1973 All-Ireland final.

On 2 September 1973, Kilkenny and Limerick clashed in an All-Ireland decider for the first time in thirty-three years. This was the sixth meeting between the sides with Limerick leading the early head-to-head 3-2. Limerick, however, started the game as rank outsiders against a Kilkenny team that were appearing in their third successive decider. In spite of this, Kilkenny suffered an amazing streak of bad luck and lost several key players in the lead in to the game. Éamonn Morrissey was forced to emigrate to Australia, Jim Treacy was ruled out due to injury, Kieran Purcell couldn’t play because of appendicitis and star forward Eddie Keher couldn’t play because of a broken collar bone. However what is seldom mentioned is that four very prominent hurlers Leonard Enright, Jim O'Donnell, Michael Graham and Mick O'Loughlin were all unavailable, for one reason or another to Limerick.In a tactical masterstroke, Limerick moved their own star forward, Éamonn Cregan, to centre-back where he nullified the Kilkenny attack. Richie Bennis top scored with ten points while Mossie Dowling scored what has been described as a "push over" goal to help Limerick to a 1-21 to 1-14 victory. It remained Limerick's last All-Ireland triumph, until they ended a 45 year wait in 2018.

Kilkenny didn't have to wait long to avenge that defeat as Limerick provided the opposition in the All-Ireland decider on 1 September 1974. A full-strength Kilkenny dominated the game in spite of Limerick starting as the favourites. Eddie Keher top scored with 1-11, while Richie Bennis was once again Limerick's ace marksman with five points. Kilkenny eventually triumphed by 3-19 to 1-13.

=== 2005-2014: Kilkenny dominance ===
The All-Ireland quarter-final showdown between Kilkenny and Limerick on 31 July 2005 was the sides' first championship meeting in thirty-one years. It was also their first championship encounter outside of an All-Ireland decider. Kilkenny got off to the better start going into a 0-3 to 0-1 lead after ten minutes. Henry Shefflin hit a five-point glut between the nineteenth and 25th-minutes that proved the winning of a game that failed to fire. A goal would have done that, but Limerick’s best chance, netted by Donie Ryan just seconds into the second half, was ruled out for steps. Limerick reduced the gap to just a solitary point with twenty minutes to go, however, Kilkenny held on to secure an 0-18 to 0-13 victory.

Two years later in 2007, Limerick proved to be the surprise package in the championship. After finishing runners-up in the Munster final, subsequent defeats of Clare and a five-goal blitz of Waterford booked their place in the All-Ireland final against reigning champions Kilkenny on 2 September 2007. "The Cats" blitzed Limerick in the opening ten minutes sprinting into a 2-2 to no score lead. Goals from man of the match Eddie Brennan (who scored 1-5) and Henry Shefflin, who eventually went off injured, got Kilkenny off to the dream start. Limerick struggled to get a foothold until a twelfth minute Andrew O'Shaughnessy free. Kilkenny led by eight points at the interval, however, a determined Limerick kept fighting and got their reward in the 47th minute when Ollie Moran blasted home past P. J. Ryan in the Kilkenny goal. Limerick failed to kick on from this and Kilkenny eventually triumphed by 2-19 to 1-15.

On 29 July 2012, a bumper crowd of 38,116 saw Kilkenny take on Limerick in the All-Ireland quarter-final at Semple Stadium. It was their first ever championship clash outside of Croke Park. David Breen drilled in a first-half Limerick goal, but Henry Shefflin responded with two Kilkenny goals in the space of three minutes to give Kilkenny an interval lead of 2-7 to 1-9. In spite of this a shock looked like a very real possibility with Limerick, who had played into a stiff breeze, belying their massive underdog tag with a first-half display of poise and class. Even seven minutes into the second half, that shock still looked likely, with Limerick easily containing the anticipated Kilkenny backlash. The following twelve minutes saw Kilkenny up the ante and score 205 without reply to sink Limerick's challenge. Aidan Fogarty and Colin Fennelly bagged the goals that secured a 4-16 to 1-16 victory.

For the second time in three seasons, Kilkenny and Limerick faced off in the business end of the championship. The All-Ireland semi-final on 10 August 2014 saw Kilkenny enter the game as Leinster champions, while Limerick were the defeated finalists in Munster. 45,478 spectators witnessed a tense game that was punctuated buy heavy downpours of rain, with the floodlights coming on well before half-time. Limerick opened up a three-point lead as the interval approached, however, Kilkenny finished the half with an unanswered 1-2 as Michael Fennelly and Padraig Walsh flashed over points before a Richie Hogan goal. Limerick fought back in the second half, however, after Shane Dowling fired Limerick into a 0-16 to 1-11 lead in the 55th minute, the Treaty men would manage just one more point in the game. Kilkenny cut loose with a crucial Eoin Larkin goal and two pointed T. J. Reid frees to secure a 2-13 to 0-17 victory.

== Statistics ==
Team	All-Ireland	Provincial	National League	Total
Kilkenny	36	75	19	129
Limerick	12	24	14	47
Combined	48	99	33	180

Up to date as of 23 July 2023

== All time championship results ==
=== Legend ===
Limerick win
Kilkenny win
Draw

=== Senior ===
No.	Date	Winners	Score	Runners-up	Venue	Competition
1.	30 October 1898	Limerick (1)	3-4 - 2-4	Kilkenny	Tipperary	All-Ireland final
2.	3 September 1933	Kilkenny (1)	1-7 - 0-6	Limerick	Croke Park	All-Ireland final
3.	1 September 1935	Kilkenny (2)	2-5 - 2-4	Limerick	Croke Park	All-Ireland final
4.	6 September 1936	Limerick (2)	5-6 - 1-5	Kilkenny	Croke Park	All-Ireland final
5.	1 September 1940	Limerick (3)	3-7 - 1-7	Kilkenny	Croke Park	All-Ireland final
6.	2 September 1973	Limerick (4)	1-21 - 1-14	Kilkenny	Croke Park	All-Ireland final
7.	1 September 1974	Kilkenny (3)	3-19 - 1-13	Limerick	Croke Park	All-Ireland final
8.	31 July 2005	Kilkenny (4)	0-18 - 0-13	Limerick	Croke Park	All-Ireland quarter-final
9.	2 September 2007	Kilkenny (5)	2-19 - 1-15	Limerick	Croke Park	All-Ireland final
10.	29 July 2012	Kilkenny (6)	4-16 - 1-16	Limerick	Semple Stadium	All-Ireland quarter-final
11.	10 August 2014	Kilkenny (7)	2-13 - 0-17	Limerick	Croke Park	All-Ireland semi-final
12.	1 July 2017	Kilkenny (8)	0-20 - 0-17	Limerick	Nowlan Park	All-Ireland qualifiers
13.	15 July 2018	Limerick (5)	0-27 - 1-22	Kilkenny	Semple Stadium	All-Ireland quarter-final
14.	27 July 2019	Kilkenny (9)	1-21 - 2-17	Limerick	Croke Park	All-Ireland semi-final
15.	17 July 2022	Limerick (6)	1-31 - 2-26	Kilkenny	Croke Park	All-Ireland final
16.	23 July 2023	Limerick (7)	0-30 - 2-15	Kilkenny	Croke Park	All-Ireland final

=== Intermediate ===
No.	Date	Winners	Score	Runners-up	Venue	Competition
1.	10 October 1998	Limerick (1)	4-16 - 2-17	Kilkenny	Semple Stadium	All-Ireland final
2.	30 August 2008	Kilkenny (1)	1-16 - 0-13	Limerick	Semple Stadium	All-Ireland final

=== Junior ===
No.	Date	Winners	Score	Runners-up	Venue	Competition
1.	8 September 1935	Limerick (1)	6-8 - 0-00	Kilkenny	Walsh Park	All-Ireland semi-final
2.	25 August 1946	Kilkenny (1)	4-5 - 2-5	Limerick	Walsh Park	All-Ireland semi-final
3.	24 August 1986	Kilkenny (2)	1-17 - 0-15	Limerick	Semple Stadium	All-Ireland final

=== Under-21 ===
No.	Date	Winners	Score	Runners-up	Venue	Competition
1.	9 September 2017	Limerick (1)	0-17 - 0-11	Kilkenny	Semple Stadium	All-Ireland final
2.	22 May 2022	Kilkenny (1)	0-19 - 0-18	Limerick	Semple Stadium	All-Ireland final

=== Minor ===
No.	Date	Winners	Score	Runners-up	Venue	Competition
1.	2 September 1984	Limerick	1-14 - 3-8	Kilkenny	Semple Stadium	All-Ireland final
2.	16 September 1984	Limerick (1)	2-5 - 2-4	Kilkenny	Semple Stadium	All-Ireland final replay
3.	7 September 2014	Kilkenny (1)	2-17 - 0-19	Limerick	Croke Park	All-Ireland final
4.	21 July 2018	Kilkenny (2)	3-22 - 1-12	Limerick	Semple Stadium	All-Ireland Quarter Final Rounds 1-3
5.	27 July 2019	Kilkenny (3)	2-24 - 0-18	Limerick	Croke Park	All-Ireland Semi final

== Records ==
=== Scorelines ===
- Biggest championship win:
  - For Kilkenny: Kilkenny 3-19 - 1-13 Limerick, 1974 All-Ireland final, Croke Park, 1 September 1974
  - For Limerick: Limerick 5-6 - 1-5 Kilkenny, 1936 All-Ireland final, Croke Park, 6 September 1936
- Highest aggregate (3-57, 66pts):
  - Limerick 1-31 - 2-26 Kilkenny, 2022 All-Ireland Senior Hurling Championship Final, Croke Park, 17 July 2022

=== Most appearances ===
Team	Player	Championship games	Total
Kilkenny	T. J. Reid	2012, 2014, 2017, 2018, 2019, 2022, 2023	7
Limerick	Nicky Quaid	2012, 2014, 2017, 2018, 2019, 2022, 2023	7
Kilkenny	J. J. Delaney	2005, 2007, 2012, 2014	4
Kilkenny	Eoin Larkin	2005, 2007, 2012, 2014	4
Kilkenny	Richie Power	2005, 2007, 2012, 2014	4
Kilkenny	Henry Shefflin	2005, 2007, 2012, 2014	4
Limerick	Paddy Clohessy	1933, 1935, 1936, 1940	4
Limerick	John Mackey	1933, 1935, 1936, 1940	4
Limerick	Mick Mackey	1933, 1935, 1936, 1940	4
Limerick	Jim Roche	1933, 1935, 1936, 1940	4
Limerick	Timmy Ryan	1933, 1935, 1936, 1940	4
Limerick	Paddy Scanlan	1933, 1935, 1936, 1940	4

=== Top scorers ===
Team	Player	Score	Total
Kilkenny	T. J. Reid	0-44	44
Limerick	Aaron Gillane	1-24	27
Kilkenny	Henry Shefflin	3-17	26
Limerick	Shane Dowling	1-20	23
Kilkenny	Colin Fennelly	2-11	17
Limerick	Diarmaid Byrnes	0-16	16
Limerick	Richie Bennis	0-15	15
Limerick	Gearóid Hegarty	1-12	15

- Top scorer in a single game:
  - For Kilkenny: 1-11
    - Eddie Keher, Kilkenny 3-19 - 1-13 Limerick, 1974 All-Ireland final, Croke Park, 1 September 1974
  - For Limerick: 0-10
    - Richie Bennis, Limerick 1-21 - 1-14 Kilkenny, All-Ireland final, Croke Park, 2 September 1973

=== Attendances ===
- Highest attendance:
  - 82,127 - Kilkenny 2-19 - 1-15 Limerick, All-Ireland final, Croke Park, 2 September 2007
- Lowest attendance:
  - c.5,000 - Limerick 3-4 - 2-4 Kilkenny, All-Ireland final, Tipperary, 30 October 1898
