= Kilkenny–Waterford hurling rivalry =

Kilkenny-Waterford
- Location: County Kilkenny; County Waterford
- Teams: Kilkenny; Waterford
- First meeting: Kilkenny 4–10 – 3–12 Waterford; 1957 All-Ireland final (1 September 1957)
- Latest meeting: Waterford 2–27 – 2–23 Kilkenny; 2020 All-Ireland Semi Final (28 November 2020)

Statistics
- Total meetings: 15
- Most player appearances: Michael Walsh (9)
- Top scorer: T. J. Reid (3–44)
- All-time series: Kilkenny 10–3 Waterford (2 draws)
- Largest victory: Kilkenny 3–30 – 1–13 Waterford; 2008 All-Ireland final (7 September 2008)

The Kilkenny-Waterford rivalry is a hurling rivalry between Irish county teams Kilkenny and Waterford, who first played each other in 1957. In spite of the infrequent nature of the meetings, it is considered to be one of the most intense rivalry matches in Gaelic games. Kilkenny's home ground is Nowlan Park and Waterford's home ground is Walsh Park, however, all of their championship meetings have been held at neutral venues, usually Croke Park.

While Kilkenny have the highest number of All-Ireland and Leinster titles, Waterford have enjoyed success at sporadic intervals throughout their history winning just two All-Ireland titles.

== Roots ==
=== History ===
Kilkenny are one of the most successful teams in the championship, having captured thirty six All-Ireland titles, and together with Cork and Tipperary form hurling's 'Big Three'. Waterford, on the other hand, have had sporadic periods of success throughout championship history resulting in two only All-Ireland titles. After a golden age for the team in the 1950s and 1960s Waterford went into severe decline in subsequent decades.

The Kilkenny – Waterford hurling rivalry first began in 1957 with their first meeting in the All-Ireland Hurling Final. Kilkenny won on a scoreline of 4–10 to 3–12. Two years later, in 1959, the teams played out a draw. Until 2012, this had been the last drawn game in the All-Ireland Hurling Final. The replay saw Waterford win their 2nd, and last to date All-Ireland Hurling Championship. The game was also notable for the Kilkenny debut of Eddie Keher. The two teams also met in the 1963 Final, with Kilkenny winning. This would be the last game between the two teams for 35 years.

During the 1990s and 2000s, Waterford hurling experienced a resurgence after the dark periods of the 1970s and 1980s. Waterford met Kilkenny in two semi-finals in both 1998 and 2004, with Waterford losing in two close battles. Having not played in a final since 1963, Waterford again met Kilkenny in the 2008 All-Ireland Senior Hurling Championship Final. Since then, the two teams have met in three Semi-finals and a qualifier. Kilkenny were triumphant on all occasions except 2016 where the sides drew.

=== Outside hurling ===
The intensity of the rivalry has also been stoked outside hurling. The two counties share a border, splitting the village of Ferrybank in two. Future expansion of County Waterford into County Kilkenny has been muted which has heightened the rivalry.

== Statistics ==
Up to date as of 2023 National Hurling League

Team	All-Ireland	Provincial	National League	Total
Kilkenny	36	74	19	129
Waterford	2	9	4	15
Combined	38	83	23	144

== Inter-county results ==
=== Legend ===
Kilkenny win
Waterford win
Draw

=== Senior ===
No.	Date	Winners	Score	Runners-up	Venue	Competition
1.	1 September 1957	Kilkenny (1)	4–10 – 3–12	Waterford	Croke Park	All-Ireland final
2.	6 September 1959	Kilkenny	5–5 – 1–17	Waterford	Croke Park	All-Ireland final
3.	4 October 1959	Waterford (1)	3–12 – 1–10	Kilkenny	Croke Park	All-Ireland final replay
4.	1 September 1963	Kilkenny (2)	4–17 – 6–8	Waterford	Croke Park	All-Ireland final
5.	16 August 1998	Kilkenny (3)	1–11 – 1–10	Waterford	Croke Park	All-Ireland semi-final
6.	8 August 2004	Kilkenny (4)	3–12 – 0–18	Waterford	Croke Park	All-Ireland semi-final
7.	7 September 2008	Kilkenny (5)	3–30 – 1–13	Waterford	Croke Park	All-Ireland final
8.	9 August 2009	Kilkenny (6)	2–23 – 3–15	Waterford	Croke Park	All-Ireland semi-final
9.	7 August 2011	Kilkenny (7)	2–19 – 1–16	Waterford	Croke Park	All-Ireland semi-final
10.	13 July 2013	Kilkenny (8)	1–22 – 2–16	Waterford	Semple Stadium	All-Ireland qualifiers
11.	9 August 2015	Kilkenny (9)	1–21 – 0–18	Waterford	Croke Park	All-Ireland semi-final
12.	7 August 2016	Kilkenny	1–21 – 0–24	Waterford	Croke Park	All-Ireland semi-final
13.	13 August 2016	Kilkenny (10)	2–19 – 2–17	Waterford	Semple Stadium	All-Ireland semi-final replay
14.	8 July 2017	Waterford (2)	4–23 – 2–22	Kilkenny	Semple Stadium	All-Ireland qualifiers
15.	28 November 2020	Waterford (3)	2-27 – 2-23	Kilkenny	Croke Park	All-Ireland semi-final

=== Under-21 ===
No.	Date	Winners	Score	Runners-up	Venue	Competition
1.	8 September 1974	Kilkenny (1)	3–8 – 3–7	Waterford	Semple Stadium	All-Ireland final
2.	21 August 1994	Kilkenny (2)	2–21 – 3–6	Waterford	Semple Stadium	All-Ireland semi-final

=== Minor ===
No.	Date	Winners	Score	Runners-up	Venue	Competition
1.	5 September 1948	Waterford (1)	3–8 – 4–2	Kilkenny	Croke Park	All-Ireland final
2.	23 July 2011	Waterford (2)	0–15 – 0–9	Kilkenny	Walsh Park	All-Ireland quarter-final
3.	11 August 2013	Waterford (3)	2–12 – 0–16	Kilkenny	Croke Park	All-Ireland semi-final
4.	10 August 2014	Kilkenny (1)	1–23 – 1–14	Waterford	Croke Park	All-Ireland semi-final

== Club results ==
Kilkenny win
Waterford win
Draw

=== Senior ===
No.	Date	Winners	Score	Runners-up	Venue	Competition
1.	16 May 1982	James Stephens (1)	3–13 – 3–8	Mount Sion	Croke Park	All-Ireland final
2.	09 Feb 2019	Ballyhale Shamrocks (2)	1–15 – 0–13	Ballygunner	Semple Stadium	All-Ireland semi-final

== Records ==
=== Scorelines ===
- Biggest championship win:
  - For Kilkenny: Kilkenny 3–30 – 1–13 Waterford, 2008 All-Ireland final, Croke Park, 7 September 2008
  - For Waterford: Waterford 3–12 – 1–10 Kilkenny, 1959 All-Ireland final replay, Croke Park, 4 October 1959
- Highest aggregate:
  - Waterford 4–23 – 2–22 Kilkenny, 2017 All-Ireland qualifier, Semple Stadium, 8 July 2017

=== Most appearances ===
Team	Player	Championship games	Total
Kilkenny	T. J. Reid	2008, 2009, 2011, 2015, 2016, 2016 (replay), 2017, 2020	8
Waterford	Michael Walsh	2004, 2008, 2009, 2011, 2013, 2015, 2016, 2016 (replay), 2017	9

=== Top scorers ===
Team	Player	Score	Total
Kilkenny	T. J. Reid	3–44	53
Waterford	Pauric Mahony	0–31	31

- Top scorer in a single game:
  - For Kilkenny: 2–12
    - T. J. Reid, Kilkenny 2–22 – 4–23, All-Ireland qualifier, Semple Stadium, 8 July 2017
  - For Waterford: 0–13
    - Paul Flynn, Waterford 0–18 – 3–12 Kilkenny, 2004 All-Ireland semi-final, Croke Park, 8 August 2004
