= James McGarry (hurler) =

Kilkenny hurler (born 1971)

Personal information
- Native name: Séamus Mag Fhearaigh (Irish)
- Born: 26 November 1971 (age 54) Bennettsbridge, County Kilkenny, Ireland
- Occupation: JCB Operator
- Height: 6 ft 0 in (183 cm)

Sport
- Sport: Hurling
- Position: Goalkeeper
Club
- Years: Club
- Bennettsbridge
Club titles
- Kilkenny titles: 0
Inter-county**
Years	County	Apps (scores)
1997-2008	Kilkenny	35 (0-0)
Inter-county titles
- Leinster titles: 7
- All-Irelands: 6
- NHL: 3
- **Inter County team apps and scores correct as of 8 September 2008.

James Bernard McGarry (born 26 November 1971) is an Irish former hurler who played as a goalkeeper at senior level for the Kilkenny county team.

Born in Bennettsbridge, County Kilkenny, McGarry first played competitive hurling whilst at school in Kilkenny CBS. He arrived on the inter-county scene at the age of twenty-one when he first linked up with the Kilkenny junior team. He joined the senior team for the 1997 championship. McGarry went on to play a key part for Kilkenny for over a decade, and won five All-Ireland medals, seven Leinster medals and three National Hurling League medals. He was an All-Ireland runner-up on two occasions.

As a member of the Leinster inter-provincial team on a number of occasions, McGarry won three Railway Cup medals. At club level he enjoyed a lengthy but largely unsuccessful career with Bennettsbridge.

Throughout his career McGarry made 35 championship appearances. His retirement came following Kilkenny's defeat of Waterford in the 2008 championship.

In retirement from playing McGarry became involved in team management and coaching. He was joint-manager of the Ballyhale Shamrocks team that claimed county, Leinster and All-Ireland titles during the 2009-10 season. In September 2013 McGarry was appointed as a selector to the Kilkenny senior team.

== Playing career ==
=== Club ===
McGarry was born in Bennettsbridge, County Kilkenny, and plays his club hurling with his local club in Bennettsbridge. Although best known as a goalkeeper, McGarry began his playing career as an outfield player. While Bennettsbridge were once regarded as one of the best clubs in the county championship their fortunes have taken a downturn in the last few decades. In spite of this McGarry has still had some success with the club, winning intermediate league county medals and county junior football medals.

=== Junior ===
Surprisingly McGarry never lined out at minor or under-21 levels for his native county. Instead he first came to prominence as a goalkeeper on the Kilkenny junior hurling team in the 1990s. He first tasted success in 1993 when he won a Leinster junior title following a win over Wexford. McGarry later lined out against Clare in the All-Ireland final, however, Kilkenny were completely outclassed on that occasion. A final score of 3-10 to 0-8 gave Clare the victory.

In 1994, McGarry won a second Leinster junior title when Kilkenny defeated Wexford in the provincial final. Kilkenny again advanced to the All-Ireland final, losing to Cork by 2–13 to 2–11.

In 1995 McGarry collected a third consecutive Leinster medal. Once again Kilkenny subsequently qualified for the All-Ireland final. It was their third consecutive championship decider in-a-row; however, defeat had been their lot in the previous two deciders. Clare were the opponents on this occasion, however, Kilkenny won 1-20 to 1-6, giving McGarry an All-Ireland junior medal.

=== Senior ===
McGarry subsequently joined the Kilkenny senior hurling panel in 1997 as sub goalkeeper to Joe Dermody. At the age of 26 it appeared that his chance at senior championship hurling may have passed by. All this changed in 1999 when he took over as the first-choice goalkeeper on the senior team under the new manager Brian Cody. That year he won his first senior Leinster title following a comprehensive victory over reigning All-Ireland champions Offaly. McGarry later lined out in his first All-Ireland final, with arch-rivals Cork providing the opposition. Although he kept a clean sheet, a Cork team, with an average age of 22, came back from four points down to win the game by a solitary point.

In 2000, McGarry captured a second Leinster title as Kilkenny steamrolled Offaly once again in the provincial final. The ‘back-door system’ allowed the two sides to later meet again in the All-Ireland final. The game turned out to be a complete mismatch as the Kilkenny forwards went on a goal-scoring spree. It was one of the most one-sided All-Ireland finals in decades as ‘the Cats’ won by 5-15 to 1-14. This victory gave McGarry his first senior All-Ireland medal.

In 2001 McGarry added a third successive Leinster medal to his collection as Kilkenny beat Wexford in the provincial final once again. After such a huge win ‘the Cats’ were hot favourites to retain their All-Ireland title; however, Kilkenny were outsmarted by Galway in the All-Ireland semi-final.

‘The Cats’ bounced back in 2002 with McGarry claiming a first National Hurling League medal. He subsequently claimed a fourth Leinster title before later lining out in a third All-Ireland final. Clare, who were defeated in the first-round of the Munster championship but had made it to the final via the newly introduced qualifier system, put up a good fight, however, McGarry claimed another clean sheet in a championship decider. A combined tally of 2-13 for Henry Shefflin and D.J. Carey gave Kilkenny a seven-point victory and gave McGarry a second All-Ireland medal.

In 2003, McGarry captured a fifth consecutive Leinster medal after another huge win. The subsequent All-Ireland final saw ‘the Cats’ take on arch-rivals Cork. It was a close and tense affair as the Leinster men never led by more than four points. Kilkenny only secured victory with a late Martin Comerford goal and won the day with a 1-14 to 1-11 score line. It was McGarry’s third All-Ireland medal in four years.

In 2004, Kilkenny were aiming for a third All-Ireland victory in-a-row; however, the team was now under severe pressure from all quarters. For the first time in seven years Kilkenny failed in their bid to become Leinster champions as a last-gasp Wexford goal ended a run of success in the provincial championship. Kilkenny took the scenic route via the qualifiers system; however, after a scare against Clare they still reached the All-Ireland final. Once again Cork provided the opposition on a gloomy and overcast day. The sides were level for much of the game; however, in the final twenty minutes Cork scored nine points without reply and secured the victory. Kilkenny ended the year with no silverware, however, McGarry kept a clean sheet in a third All-Ireland final.

Kilkenny were back in form in 2005 with McGarry adding a second National League medal to his collection. He later collected a sixth Leinster title as ‘the Cats’ had a narrow win over reigning provincial champions Wexford. While a third successive All-Ireland showdown with Cork seemed extremely likely, Galway defeated Kilkenny in the All-Ireland semi-finals.

In 2006 McGarry captured a third National League medal. He later won a third Leinster title following another victory over Wexford before later lining out in his third All-Ireland final. The game that everyone had predicted would happen in 2005 was now taking place as Cork squared up to Kilkenny for the third time in four years. The Leesiders were aiming for a third All-Ireland victory in-a-row; however, revenge was foremost in the minds of Kilkenny as it was Cork who denied their three-in-a-row bid in 2004. On the day Kilkenny were far too strong for Cork with McGarry playing a key role on the goal-line. The score of 1-16 to 1-13 gave Kilkenny a 29th All-Ireland title and gave McGarry a fourth All-Ireland medal. For the seventh time in eight years McGarry was nominated for an All-Star award, however, once again he was overlooked.

In 2007 McGarry was dropped as the first-choice goalkeeper on the Kilkenny senior team and was replaced by P.J. Ryan, his understudy of many years. In the All-Ireland semi-final against Wexford Ryan fractured his arm and for a while it looked like McGarry would make an emotional return to senior hurling after his wife’s death in a road traffic accident earlier in the year. In the end Ryan made a spectacular recovery and was fit to play. Kilkenny went on to defeat Limerick by 2-19 to 1-15 and McGarry and his son received a special mention from captain Henry Shefflin as he received the Liam MacCarthy Cup.

While many expected McGarry to retire from inter-county hurling following this win he returned to the panel in 2008 as Kilkenny launched an all-out attack in an attempt to capture a third All-Ireland title in-a-row. He remained on the substitutes’ bench for the entire campaign until the All-Ireland final against Waterford. After fifty minutes the game was effectively over due to the huge score that Kilkenny had recorded. At that point goalkeeper P.J. Ryan was called to the sideline and McGarry went in as a substitute. He received a warm welcome from both the Kilkenny and the Waterford fans as they both realised the significance of the situation. Although the game was well beyond Waterford at that stage, McGarry did leave in an Eoin Kelly goal. In spite of this Kilkenny won the game by 3-30 to 1-13. It was McGarry’s sixth All-Ireland medal and his fifth on the field of play. Furthermore, the team made history by capturing their elusive three-in-a-row. He retired from inter-county hurling following this win.

=== Provincial ===
McGarry has also lined out with Leinster in the inter-provincial hurling competition and has enjoyed some success. He won his first Railway Cup medal in 2002 as Leinster defeated arch-rivals Munster. McGarry won a second Railway Cup title in 2003 when Leinster defeated a Connacht side made up entirely of Galway players. 2006 saw McGarry add a third and final Railway Cup medal to his collection.

== Coaching career ==
In 2009 McGarry took up a coaching and joint-managerial role with the Kilkenny club Ballyhale Shamrocks. He has guided the club to a record-equalling four-in-a-row in the county championship. This was followed by the Shamrocks retaining the Leinster club title and regaining the All-Ireland title.

== Personal life ==
McGarry currently lives in Thomastown with his son Darragh (born 1996), who plays goalkeeper for Thomastown GAA. In 2007, shortly before the 2007 All Ireland Final his wife Vanessa was killed in a car crash outside Thomastown. McGarry and his son were honored at the final and Darragh helped Henry Shefflin hold up the Liam MacCarthy Cup.
