= Kilkenny–Wexford hurling rivalry =

Irish hurling rivalry

Kilkenny-Wexford
- Location: County Kilkenny; County Wexford
- Teams: Kilkenny; Wexford
- First meeting: Kilkenny 4-16 - 0-2 Wexford; 1900 Leinster quarter-final (1900)
- Latest meeting: Kilkenny 5-21 - 1-16 Wexford; 2026 Leinster SHC round 2 (25 April 2026)
- Next meeting: TBA
- Stadiums: UPMC Nowlan Park (Kilkenny); Chadwicks Wexford Park (Wexford)

Statistics
- Total meetings: 85
- Most wins: Kilkenny
- All-time series: Kilkenny 57-3-25 Wexford

The Kilkenny-Wexford rivalry is a hurling rivalry between Irish county teams Kilkenny and Wexford, who first played each other in 1900. It is considered to be one of the biggest rivalries in Gaelic games. Kilkenny's home ground is UPMC Nowlan Park and Wexford's home ground is Chadwicks Wexford Park.

While both teams play provincial hurling in the Leinster Senior Hurling Championship, they have also enjoyed success in the All-Ireland Senior Hurling Championship, having won 42 championship titles between them to date. In spite of this they have never met in an All-Ireland final.

== All time results ==
=== Legend ===
Kilkenny win
Wexford win
Drawn game

=== Senior championship ===
No.	Date	Winners	Score	Runners-up	Venue	Stage
	31 May 1931	Kilkenny	8-08 - 1-01	Wexford	O'Kennedy Park	Leinster SHC quarter-final
	31 May 1942	Kilkenny	5-05 - 4-04	Wexford	O'Kennedy Park	Leinster SHC semi-final
	2 May 1943	Kilkenny	4-09 - 3-04	Wexford	Nowlan Park	Leinster SHC quarter-final
	18 June 1944	Wexford	6-04 - 4-06	Kilkenny	O'Kennedy Park	Leinster SHC semi-final
	13 May 1945	Kilkenny	2-11 - 2-04	Wexford	Nowlan Park	Leinster SHC quarter-final
	2 June 1946	Kilkenny	7-04 - 2-02	Wexford	O'Kennedy Park	Leinster SHC semi-final
	29 June 1947	Kilkenny	5-11 - 3-08	Wexford	Nowlan Park	Leinster SHC semi-final
	15 May 1949	Kilkenny	4-11 - 1-04	Wexford	Croke Park	Leinster SHC quarter-final
	16 July 1950	Kilkenny	3-11 - 2-11	Wexford	Croke Park	Leinster SHC final
	8 June 1952	Wexford	4-07 - 5-01	Kilkenny	Croke Park	Leinster SHC semi-final
	19 July 1953	Kilkenny	1-13 - 3-05	Wexford	Croke Park	Leinster SHC final
	6 June 1954	Wexford	5-11 - 0-07	Kilkenny	Croke Park	Leinster SHC semi-final
	17 July 1955	Wexford	2-07 - 2-07	Kilkenny	Croke Park	Leinster SHC final
	31 July 1955	Wexford	5-06 - 3-09	Kilkenny	Croke Park	Leinster SHC final replay
	8 July 1956	Wexford	4-08 - 3-10	Kilkenny	Croke Park	Leinster SHC final
	4 August 1957	Kilkenny	6-09 - 1-05	Wexford	Croke Park	Leinster SHC final
	27 July 1958	Kilkenny	5-12 - 4-09	Wexford	Croke Park	Leinster SHC final
	24 July 1960	Wexford	3-10 - 2-11	Kilkenny	Croke Park	Leinster SHC final
	18 June 1961	Wexford	6-08 - 5-07	Kilkenny	Croke Park	Leinster SHC semi-final
	22 July 1962	Wexford	3-09 - 2-10	Kilkenny	Croke Park	Leinster SHC final
	7 July 1963	Kilkenny	4-09 - 3-08	Wexford	Croke Park	Leinster SHC semi-final
	5 July 1964	Kilkenny	5-09 - 4-08	Wexford	Croke Park	Leinster SHC semi-final
	1 August 1965	Wexford	2-11 - 3-07	Kilkenny	Croke Park	Leinster SHC final
	17 July 1966	Kilkenny	1-15 - 2-06	Wexford	Croke Park	Leinster SHC final
	16 July 1967	Kilkenny	4-10 - 1-12	Wexford	Croke Park	Leinster SHC final
	14 July 1968	Wexford	3-13 - 4-09	Kilkenny	Croke Park	Leinster SHC final
	12 July 1970	Wexford	4-16 - 3-14	Kilkenny	Croke Park	Leinster SHC final
	11 July 1971	Kilkenny	6-16 - 3-16	Wexford	Croke Park	Leinster SHC final
	9 July 1972	Kilkenny	6-13 - 6-13	Wexford	Croke Park	Leinster SHC final
	30 July 1972	Kilkenny	3-16 - 1-14	Wexford	Croke Park	Leinster SHC final replay
	8 July 1973	Kilkenny	4-22 - 3-15	Wexford	Croke Park	Leinster SHC final
	21 July 1974	Kilkenny	6-13 - 2-24	Wexford	Croke Park	Leinster SHC final
	3 August 1975	Kilkenny	2-20 - 2-14	Wexford	Croke Park	Leinster SHC final
	18 July 1976	Wexford	2-20 - 1-06	Kilkenny	Croke Park	Leinster SHC final
	24 July 1977	Wexford	3-17 - 3-14	Kilkenny	Croke Park	Leinster SHC final
	16 July 1978	Kilkenny	2-16 - 1-16	Wexford	Croke Park	Leinster SHC final
	15 July 1979	Kilkenny	2-21 - 2-17	Wexford	Croke Park	Leinster SHC final
	15 June 1980	Kilkenny	4-18 - 3-16	Wexford	Croke Park	Leinster SHC semi-final
	21 June 1981	Wexford	4-12 - 1-18	Kilkenny	Croke Park	Leinster SHC semi-final
	19 June 1983	Kilkenny	5-13 - 3-15	Wexford	Croke Park	Leinster SHC semi-final
	17 June 1984	Wexford	3-10 - 1-13	Kilkenny	Croke Park	Leinster SHC semi-final
	1 June 1986	Kilkenny	1-21 - 0-18	Wexford	Croke Park	Leinster SHC quarter-final
	21 June 1987	Kilkenny	3-20 - 2-15	Wexford	Croke Park	Leinster SHC semi-final
	19 June 1988	Wexford	4-12 - 2-16	Kilkenny	Croke Park	Leinster SHC semi-final
	18 June 1989	Kilkenny	4-15 - 2-18	Wexford	Croke Park	Leinster SHC semi-final
	30 June 1991	Kilkenny	2-09 - 0-13	Wexford	Croke Park	Leinster SHC semi-final
	5 July 1992	Kilkenny	3-16 - 2-09	Wexford	Croke Park	Leinster SHC final
	11 July 1993	Kilkenny	2-14 - 1-17	Wexford	Croke Park	Leinster SHC final
	18 July 1993	Kilkenny	2-12 - 0-11	Wexford	Croke Park	Leinster SHC final replay
	2 June 1996	Wexford	1-14 - 0-14	Kilkenny	Croke Park	Leinster SHC final
	13 July 1997	Wexford	2-14 - 1-11	Kilkenny	Croke Park	Leinster SHC final
	8 July 2001	Kilkenny	2-19 - 0-12	Wexford	Croke Park	Leinster SHC final
	7 July 2002	Kilkenny	0-19 - 0-17	Wexford	Croke Park	Leinster SHC final
	6 July 2003	Kilkenny	2-23 - 2-12	Wexford	Croke Park	Leinster SHC final
	13 June 2004	Wexford	2-15 - 1-16	Kilkenny	Croke Park	Leinster SHC semi-final
	3 July 2005	Kilkenny	0-22 - 1-16	Wexford	Croke Park	Leinster SHC final
	2 July 2006	Kilkenny	1-23 - 2-12	Wexford	Croke Park	Leinster SHC final
	1 July 2007	Kilkenny	2-24 - 1-12	Wexford	Croke Park	Leinster SHC final
	5 August 2007	Kilkenny	0-23 - 1-10	Wexford	Croke Park	All-Ireland SHC semi-final
	6 July 2008	Kilkenny	5-21 - 0-17	Wexford	Croke Park	Leinster SHC final
	11 June 2011	Kilkenny	1-26 - 1-15	Wexford	Wexford Park	Leinster SHC semi-final
	21 June 2015	Kilkenny	5-25 - 0-16	Wexford	Nowlan Park	Leinster SHC semi-final
	10 June 2017	Wexford	1-20 - 3-11	Kilkenny	Wexford Park	Leinster SHC semi-final
	9 June 2018	Kilkenny	0-22 - 1-18	Wexford	Nowlan Park	Leinster SHC round 5
	15 June 2019	Kilkenny	1-18 - 0-21	Wexford	Innovate Wexford Park	Leinster SHC round 5
	30 June 2019	Wexford	1-23 - 0-23	Kilkenny	Croke Park	Leinster SHC final
	3 July 2021	Kilkenny	2-37 - 2-29	Wexford	Croke Park	Leinster SHC semi-final
	21 May 2022	Wexford	1-22 - 1-18	Kilkenny	UPMC Nowlan Park	Leinster SHC round 5
	28 May 2023	Wexford	4-23 - 5-18	Kilkenny	Chadwicks Wexford Park	Leinster SHC round 5
	26 May 2024	Kilkenny	1-24 - 2-20	Wexford	UPMC Nowlan Park	Leinster SHC round 5
	25 May 2025	Wexford	2-19 - 1-15	Kilkenny	Chadwicks Wexford Park	Leinster SHC round 5
	25 April 2026	Kilkenny	5-21 - 1-16	Wexford	UPMC Nowlan Park	Leinster SHC round 2

=== Under-20 championship ===
No.	Date	Winners	Score	Runners-up	Venue	Stage
	30 March 2024	Kilkenny	4-21 - 2-14	Wexford	UPMC Nowlan Park	Leinster U20HC round 1
	29 March 2025	Kilkenny	1-13 - 1-06	Wexford	St Peter's College Ground	Leinster U20HC round 1
	11 April 2026	Kilkenny	1-18 - 2-15	Wexford	UPMC Nowlan Park	Leinster U20HC round 2
