= Dick O'Hara =

Dick O’Hara
Personal information
- Native name: Risteard Ó hEára (Irish)
- Born: 28 May 1957 (age 69) Thomastown, County Kilkenny

Sport
- Sport: Hurling
- Position: Left corner-back
Club
- Years: Club
- Thomastown
Inter-county
- Years: County
- 1977-1985: Kilkenny
Inter-county titles
- Leinster titles: 3
- All-Irelands: 3
- NHL: 2
- All Stars: 1

Dick O’Hara (born 28 May 1957) is a retired Irish sportsperson. He played hurling with his local club Thomastown and was a member of the Kilkenny senior inter-county team in the 1970s and 1980s. He is regarded as one of Kilkenny's greatest-ever players.

== Playing career ==
=== Club ===
O’Hara played hurling and Gaelic football with his local Thomastown club. After much success at various juvenile levels he became a key member of the club's minor team in both codes. In 1973 he won the first of three consecutive minor county football titles. He also added a minor county hurling title to his collection in 1975. O'Hara later enjoyed much more success with the club's senior football team. He won four county football titles in 1981, 1983, 1984 and 1985. O'Hara also won a county intermediate hurling title in 1983.

=== Minor & under-21 ===
O’Hara first came to prominence as a member of the Kilkenny minor hurling in the mid-1970s. In 1973 he won his first Leinster minor title before subsequently claiming an All-Ireland medal following a victory over Galway. O’Hara won a second Leinster minor medal in 1974, however, Kilkenny lost out in the championship decider to Cork. A third Leinster minor title came O’Hara's way in 1975, and he later converted this into a second All-Ireland medal. O’Hara quickly joined the Kilkenny under-21 team where he won both Leinster and All-Ireland honours in 1975. He won a second Leinster under-21 title in 1976, however, his side were defeated by Cork in the All-Ireland final. O’Hara's great run of success continued in 1977 when he won a second set of provincial and All-Ireland honours at under-21 level.

=== Senior ===
By 1978 O'Hara was a member of the Kilkenny senior team. He lined out in his first Leinster final that year with Wexford providing the opposition. The game developed into a close affair; however, victory went to ‘the Cats’ by 2-16 to 1-16. It was O'Hara's first Leinster title. Following a subsequent victory over Galway in the All-Ireland semi-final Kilkenny faced arch-rivals Cork in the All-Ireland championship decider. Much was at stake as Cork were aiming to capture a third All-Ireland victory in-a-row and nothing would give Kilkenny greater pleasure than stopping them. Both sides remained neck and neck for much of the game, however, Cork gradually grinded down the opposition. Cork's Jimmy Barry-Murphy scored the winning goal for Cork with thirteen minutes left in the game.

The All-Ireland defeat saw a reshuffle of the team take place. O'Hara subsequently missed Kilkenny's Leinster final win of 1979, however, he returned in time for the All-Ireland final with Galway. The game, however, turned out to be one of the least exciting finals of the decade. A goal by Noel Lane after forty-seven minutes gave Galway a two-point lead; however, the men from the west failed to score for the rest of the game. Kilkenny, on the other hand, scored two long-range goals to secure a 2-12 to 1-8 victory. It was O'Hara's first All-Ireland winners' medal.

The early years of the new decade were unhappy ones for O'Hara as Offaly emerged as a new force in Leinster, winning back-to-back provincial titles in both 1980 and 1981.

By 1982 Kilkenny were back and O'Hara began the year by collecting a National Hurling League title before lining out in the Leinster final. Offaly, the reigning provincial and All-Ireland champions were the opponents on that occasion and an interesting game developed. After a close seventy minutes of hurling Kilkenny emerged victorious by just two points, giving O'Hara a second Leinster winners’ medal. He subsequently lined out in Croke Park in the All-Ireland championship decider against Cork. Christy Heffernan was the hero of the day as he scored two goals in a forty second spell just before half-time. Ger Fennelly captured a third goal in the second-half as Kilkenny completely trounced ‘the Rebels’ by 3-18 to 1-15. This victory gave O'Hara his second All-Ireland medal.

In 1983 O'Hara captured a second consecutive National League title before later playing in the Leinster final against Offaly. It was their second consecutive meeting in the provincial decider, however, on this occasion the victory was more comprehensive. A 1-17 to 0-13 win gave Cody his fourth and final Leinster medal. For the second year in-a-row ‘the Cats’ squared up to Cork in the All-Ireland final. Once again Kilkenny dominated the game, assisted by a strong wind in the first-half, and hung on in the face of a great fight-back by Cork. At the full-time whistle Kilkenny emerged victorious by 2-14 to 2-12. It was O'Hara's third and final All-Ireland medal. His performances throughout the entire championship also earned him his sole All-Star award.

Kilkenny's fortunes took a downturn following this victory as Offaly won the next two Leinster titles. O’Hara retired from inter-county hurling shortly afterwards.

=== Provincial ===
O'Hara also lined out with Leinster in the inter-provincial hurling championship. He played in the Railway Cup final of 1978, however, arch-rivals Munster were the winners of that occasion.
