= John Moloney (referee) =

Irish Gaelic football and hurling referee

- Born: 1935; Bansha, County Tipperary, Ireland
- Died: 6 October 2006 (aged 71); Bansha, County Tipperary, Ireland
- Occupation: Farmer

John Moloney (1935 – 6 October 2006) was an Irish Gaelic football and hurling referee. Born in Bansha, County Tipperary, Moloney first played competitive Gaelic football and hurling with Galtee Rovers. His subsequent refereeing career spanned six decades from 1958 to 2003.

After beginning his refereeing career at club level in 1958, Moloney took charge of his first inter-county championship game in 1965. After handling the Railway Cup final in 1967, he later took take charge of that year's All-Ireland SFC final. Moloney refereed a further four All-Ireland SFC finals (1969, 1973, 1975 and 1977), as well as the 1974 All-Ireland SHC final.

In 2022, Martin Breheny named him among "five of the best football referees".

Achievements
Preceded by Jimmy Hatton	All-Ireland SFC final referee 1967	Succeeded by Mick Loftus
Preceded by Mick Loftus	All-Ireland SFC final referee 1969	Succeeded by Paul Kelly
Preceded by Mick Spain	All-Ireland MHC final referee 1972	Succeeded by Seán O'Connor
Preceded by Paddy Devlin	All-Ireland SFC final referee 1973	Succeeded by Paddy Devlin
Preceded by Mick Slattery	All-Ireland SHC final referee 1974	Succeeded by Seán O'Connor
Preceded by Paddy Devlin	All-Ireland SFC final referee 1975	Succeeded by Paddy Collins
Preceded by Paddy Collins	All-Ireland SFC final referee 1977	Succeeded by Séamus Aldridge
