= John Long (Gaelic footballer) =

Irish Gaelic footballer

Personal information
- Native name: Seán Ó Lúing (Irish)
- Born: 1952 (age 73–74) Corca Dhuibhne, County Kerry, Ireland
- Occupation: Teacher

Sport
- Sport: Gaelic football
- Position: Midfield
Clubs
- Years: Club
- An Ghaeltacht; West Kerry
Club titles
- Kerry titles: 0
Inter-county*
Years	County	Apps (scores)
1972–1977	Kerry	3 (0-01)
Inter-county titles
- Munster titles: 3
- All-Irelands: 1
- NFL: 3
- All Stars: 0
- *Inter County team apps and scores correct as of 17:05, 25 September 2016.

John Long (born 1952) is an Irish retired Gaelic footballer. His league and championship career with the Kerry senior team spanned six seasons from 1972 to 1977.

Long made his debut on the inter-county scene at the age of seventeen when he was picked on the Kerry minor team having previously won an All-Ireland schools title, the Hogan Cup, with St. Brendan's Killarney in 1969. He enjoyed one season in this grade, ending the year as an All-Ireland runner-up. Long never played under-21 football with Kerry, however, he joined the senior team during the 1971-72 league. Over the course of the next six seasons, Long made a number of appearances on the team but failed to nail down a regular place on the starting fifteen. He won his sole All-Ireland medal as a non-playing substitute in 1975, while also winning three successive Munster medals from the bench and three National Football League medals, one of which was claimed on the field of play.

== Honours ==
Kerry

- All-Ireland Senior Football Championship (1): 1975
- Munster Senior Football Championship (3): 1975, 1976, 1977
- National Football League (3): 1971-72, 1973-74, 1976-77
- Munster Minor Football Championship (1): 1970
