= Jack Gleeson (Dublin hurler) =

Irish hurler (1903–1948)

Personal information
- Born: 4 November 1903 Kilkishen, County Clare, Ireland
- Died: 10 December 1948 (aged 45) Galway, Ireland
- Occupation: Garda Síochána

Sport
- Sport: Hurling
- Position: Midfield
Clubs
- Years: Club
- Kilkishen; Garda; Kylerue Rovers; Toomevara
Club titles
- Dublin titles: 1
Inter-county
- Years: County
- 1927 1928-1932: Dublin; Clare
Inter-county titles
- Munster titles: 1
- Leinster titles: 1
- All-Irelands: 1
- NHL: 0

John Gleeson (4 November 1903 – 10 December 1948) was an Irish hurler. At club level he played with Kilkishen, Garda and Toomevara, and also lined out at inter-county level with Dublin and Clare.

== Career ==
Gleeson first played hurling at club level with the Kilkishen club in County Clare. He was part of the Kilkishen team that won the Clare SHC title in 1923. Gleeson later transferred to the Garda club in Dublin, with whom he won a Dublin SHC medal in 1927. His performances for the club resulted in a call-up to the Dublin senior hurling team and he claimed an All-Ireland SHC winners' medal after a defeat of Cork in the 1927 All-Ireland final.

Gleeson subsequently transferred to the Toomevara club in County Tipperary. He won several North Tipperary SHC titles as well as back-to-back Tipperary SHC medals in 1930 and 1931. By that stage, Gleeson had declared for the Clare senior hurling team. He earned selection to the Munster team and won a Railway Cup medal in 1931. Gleeson won a Munster SHC medal in 1932 before later lining out in a defeat by Kilkenny in the All-Ireland final.

== Death ==
Gleeson died at the Central Hospital, Galway on 10 December 1948, at the age of 45.

== Honours ==
Kilkishen

- Clare Senior Hurling Championship: 1923

Garda

- Dublin Senior Hurling Championship: 1927

Kylerue Rovers

- North Tipperary Junior Football Championship: 1928

Toomevara

- Tipperary Senior Hurling Championship: 1930, 1931

Dublin

- All-Ireland Senior Hurling Championship: 1927
- Leinster Senior Hurling Championship: 1927

Clare

- Munster Senior Hurling Championship: 1932

Munster

- Railway Cup: 1931
