= Kilkenny–Offaly hurling rivalry =

Kilkenny-Offaly
- Location: County Kilkenny; County Offaly
- Teams: Kilkenny; Offaly
- First meeting: Kilk. 4-13 - 1-5 Offaly; 1898 Leinster semi-final (19 November 1899)
- Latest meeting: Kilk. 0-24 - 1-21 Offaly; 2026 Leinster Rounds 3 (10 May 2026)
- Next meeting: TBA

Statistics
- Total meetings: 46
- Top scorer: Henry Shefflin (6-65)
- All-time series: Championship: Kilkenny 39-7 Offaly (2 drawn games)
- Largest victory: Kilk. 6-28 - 0-15 Offaly; 2005 Leinster semi-final (12 June 2005)

The Kilkenny–Offaly rivalry is a hurling rivalry between Irish county teams Kilkenny and Offaly, who first played each other in 1899. Kilkenny's home ground is Nowlan Park and Offaly's home ground is O'Connor Park.

While Kilkenny are regarded as one of the "big three" of hurling, with Cork and Tipperary completing the trio, Offaly are ranked joint seventh in the all-time roll of honour and have enjoyed sporadic periods of dominance at various stages throughout the history of the championship. The two teams have won a combined total of 40 All-Ireland Senior Hurling Championship titles.

== Statistics ==
Up to date as of 2023 season

Team	All-Ireland	Provincial	National League	Total
Kilkenny	36	75	19	130
Offaly	4	9	1	14
Combined	40	84	20	144

== All time results ==
=== Legend ===
Kilkenny win
Offaly win
Draw

=== 1899-1908 ===
No.	Date	Winners	Score	Runners-up	Venue	Competition
1.	19 November 1899	Kilkenny (1)	4-13 - 1-5	Offaly	Jones's Road	Leinster semi-final
2.	14 July 1900	Kilkenny (2)	1-12 - 1-5	Offaly	Abbeyleix	Leinster semi-final
3.	6 March 1904	Kilkenny (3)	5-8 - 1-4	Offaly		Leinster semi-final
4.	15 April 1906	Kilkenny (4)	3-11 - 1-4	Offaly	Portlaoise	Leinster semi-final
5.	2 September 1906	Kilkenny (5)	2-15 - 0-7	Offaly	Jones's Road	Leinster semi-final
6.	10 May 1908	Kilkenny (6)	3-8 - 1-6	Offaly	Tullamore	Leinster semi-final

=== 1980-present ===
No.	Date	Winners	Score	Runners-up	Venue	Competition
20.	25 June 1978	Kilkenny (20)	2-17 - 1-4	Offaly	O'Moore Park	Leinster semi-final
21.	13 July 1980	Offaly (1)	3-17 - 5-10	Kilkenny	Croke Park	Leinster final
22.	25 July 1982	Kilkenny (21)	1-11 - 0-12	Offaly	Croke Park	Leinster final
23.	10 July 1983	Kilkenny (22)	1-17 - 0-13	Offaly	Croke Park	Leinster final
24.	23 June 1985	Kilkenny	3-18 - 3-18	Offaly	Croke Park	Leinster semi-final
25.	14 July 1985	Offaly (2)	1-20 - 0-17	Kilkenny	Croke Park	Leinster semi-final replay
26.	13 July 1986	Kilkenny (23)	4-10 - 1-11	Offaly	Croke Park	Leinster final
27.	2 August 1987	Kilkenny (24)	2-14 - 0-17	Offaly	Croke Park	Leinster final
28.	9 July 1989	Offaly (3)	3-15 -4-9	Kilkenny	Croke Park	Leinster final
29.	17 June 1990	Offaly (4)	4-15 - 1-8	Kilkenny	Croke Park	Leinster semi-final
30.	21 June 1992	Kilkenny (25)	2-15 - 1-12	Offaly	Croke Park	Leinster semi-final
31.	30 May 1993	Kilkenny (26)	2-10 - 0-14	Offaly	Croke Park	Leinster quarter-final
32.	26 June 1994	Offaly (5)	2-16 - 3-9	Kilkenny	Croke Park	Leinster semi-final
33.	16 July 1995	Offaly (6)	2-16 - 2-5	Kilkenny	Croke Park	Leinster final
34.	5 July 1998	Kilkenny (27)	3-10 - 1-11	Offaly	Croke Park	Leinster final
35.	13 September 1998	Offaly (7)	2-16 - 1-13	Kilkenny	Croke Park	All-Ireland final
36.	11 July 1999	Kilkenny (28)	5-14 - 1-16	Offaly	Croke Park	Leinster final
37.	9 July 2000	Kilkenny (29)	2-21 - 1-13	Offaly	Croke Park	Leinster final
38.	10 September 2000	Kilkenny (30)	5-15 - 1-14	Offaly	Croke Park	All-Ireland final
39.	10 June 2001	Kilkenny (31)	3-21 - 0-18	Offaly	Croke Park	Leinster semi-final
40.	9 June 2002	Kilkenny (32)	2-20 - 1-14	Offaly	Semple Stadium	Leinster semi-final
41.	12 June 2005	Kilkenny (33)	6-28 - 0-15	Offaly	Croke Park	Leinster semi-final
42.	10 June 2007	Kilkenny (34)	1-27 - 1-13	Offaly	O'Moore Park	Leinster semi-final
43.	15 June 2008	Kilkenny (35)	2-24 - 0-12	Offaly	O'Moore Park	Leinster semi-final
44.	9 June 2013	Kilkenny (36)	0-26 - 4-9	Offaly	O'Connor Park	Leinster quarter-final
45.	7 June 2014	Kilkenny (37)	5-32 - 1-18	Offaly	Nowlan Park	Leinster quarter-final
46.	20 May 2018	Kilkenny (38)	2-19 - 1-13	Offaly	Nowlan Park	Leinster Round 2
47.	10 May 2025	Kilkenny (39)	4-25 - 2-16	Offaly	Nowlan Park	Leinster Round 3
48.	10 May 2026	Kilkenny	0-24 - 1-21	Offaly	O'Connor Park	Leinster Round 3

== Records ==
=== Scorelines ===
- Biggest championship win:
  - For Kilkenny: Kilkenny 6-28 - 0-15 Offaly, 2005 Leinster semi-final, Croke Park, 12 June 2005
  - For Offaly: Offaly 4-15 - 1-8 Kilkenny, 1990 Leinster semi-final, Croke Park, 17 June 1990
- Highest aggregate:
  - Kilkenny 5-32 - 1-18 Offaly, 2014 Leinster quarter-final, Nowlan Park, 7 June 2014

=== Top scorer ===
Team	Player	Score	Total
Kilkenny	Henry Shefflin	6-65	83

=== Attendance ===
- Highest attendance:
  - 65,491 - Offaly 2-16 - 1-13 Kilkenny, All-Ireland final, Croke Park, 13 September 1998
