= Mick Doyle (hurler) =

Irish hurler

Personal information
- Native name: Mícheál Ó Dúghaill (Irish)
- Born: 1889 Mooncoin, County Kilkenny, Ireland
- Died: 1970 (aged 80–81) Mooncoin, County Kilkenny, Ireland

Sport
- Sport: Hurling
- Position: Full-forward
Club
- Years: Club
- Mooncoin
Club titles
- Kilkenny titles: 4
Inter-county
- Years: County
- 1907-1916: Kilkenny
Inter-county titles
- Leinster titles: 6
- All-Irelands: 5

Michael Doyle (1889–1970) was an Irish hurler who played as a full-forward for the Kilkenny senior team.

Born in Mooncoin, County Kilkenny, Doyle first arrived on the inter-county scene at the age of eighteen when he made his senior debut in the 1907 championship. Doyle went on to play a key part for Kilkenny during the team's first golden age, and won five All-Ireland medals and six Leinster medals. He was an All-Ireland runner-up on one occasion.

At club level Doyle won six championship medals with Mooncoin.

Doyle's brothers, Eddie and Eddie Doyle, also had All-Ireland successes with Kilkenny.
