= 1974 All-Ireland Senior Hurling Championship final =

1974 All-Ireland Senior Hurling Final
- Event: 1974 All-Ireland Senior Hurling Championship
Kilkenny	Limerick
3–19	1–13
- Date: 1 September 1974
- Venue: Croke Park, Dublin
- Referee: John Moloney (Tipperary)
- Attendance: 62,071

The 1974 All-Ireland Senior Hurling Championship Final was the 87th All-Ireland Final and the culmination of the 1974 All-Ireland Senior Hurling Championship, an inter-county hurling tournament for the top teams in Ireland. The match was held at Croke Park, Dublin, on 1 September 1974, between Kilkenny and Limerick. The Munster champions lost to their Leinster opponents on a score line of 3–19 to 1–13.

== Match details ==
1974-09-01
15:15 UTC+1
Final

Kilkenny	3–19 – 1–13	Limerick

Croke Park, Dublin
Attendance: 62,071
Referee: John Moloney (Tipperary)

Kilkenny	Limerick
