= Joe Dermody =

Irish sportsperson

Personal information
- Native name: Seosamh Ó Diarmada (Irish)
- Born: 24 September 1972 (age 54) Freshford, County Kilkenny, Ireland
- Occupation: Tirlán Employee
- Height: 5 ft 9 in (175 cm)

Sport
- Sport: Hurling
- Position: Goalkeeper
Club
- Years: Club
- St Lachtain's
Club titles
- Kilkenny titles: 0
Inter-county
- Years: County
- 1994-1999: Kilkenny
Inter-county titles
- Leinster titles: 1
- All-Irelands: 0
- NHL: 0
- All Stars: 0

Joseph James Dermody (born 24 September 1972) was an Irish sportsperson. He hurled for his local club St Lachtain's and was a member of the Kilkenny senior inter-county team from 1997 until 1999.

== Honours ==
St Lachtain's

- Kilkenny Junior Hurling Championship (1): 1993

Kilkenny

- Leinster Senior Hurling Championship (1): 1998
