= 1932 All-Ireland Senior Hurling Championship final =

1932 All-Ireland Senior Hurling Final
- Event: 1932 All-Ireland Senior Hurling Championship
Kilkenny	Clare
3–3	2–3
- Date: 4 September 1932
- Venue: Croke Park, Dublin
- Referee: Seán Robbins (Offaly)
- Attendance: 34,392

The 1932 All-Ireland Senior Hurling Championship Final was the 45th All-Ireland Final and the culmination of the 1932 All-Ireland Senior Hurling Championship, an inter-county hurling tournament for the top teams in Ireland. The match was held at Croke Park, Dublin, on 4 September 1932, between Kilkenny and Clare. The Munster champions lost to their Leinster opponents on a score line of 3–3 to 2–3.

== Match details ==
1932-09-04
15:15 UTC+1

Kilkenny	3–3 – 2–3	Clare

Croke Park, Dublin
Attendance: 34,392
Referee: S. Robbins (Offaly)

Kilkenny	Clare
