= Dick Doherty =

Irish hurler (1886–1966)

Personal information
- Native name: Risteard Ó Dochartaigh (Irish)
- Born: 23 January 1886 Mooncoin, County Kilkenny, Ireland
- Died: 11 April 1966 (aged 80) Thomastown, County Kilkenny, Ireland
- Occupation: Publican

Sport
- Sport: Hurling
- Position: Half-back
Club
- Years: Club
- Mooncoin
Club titles
- Kilkenny titles: 3
Inter-county
- Years: County
- 1906-1913: Kilkenny
Inter-county titles
- Leinster titles: 5
- All-Irelands: 5

Patrick Richard Doherty (21 January 1886 – 11 April 1966) was an Irish hurler. At club level, he played with Mooncoin and at inter-county level with the Kilkenny senior hurling team.

== Career ==
Doherty first played hurling as a member of the Mooncoin club in south Kilkenny. He was part of the club's team that won Kilkenny SHC titles in 1906, 1908 and 1913. Doherty retired from hurling shortly after his third title victory, however, he returned for one final game when, in 1924, he replaced the injured Wattie Dunphy.

At inter-county level, Doherty joined the Kilkenny senior hurling team in 1906. His career yielded five Leinster SHC medals in seven seasons between 1907 and 1913. Doherty also won five All-Ireland SHC medals after defeats of Cork (1907 and 1912) and Tipperary (1909, 1911, 1913). His other honours include back-to-back Railway Shield titles with Leinster.

== Death ==
Doherty died at St Columba's Hospital in Thomastown on 11 April 1966, at the age of 80.

== Honours ==
Mooncoin

- Kilkenny Senior Hurling Championship (3): 1906, 1908, 1913

Kilkenny

- All-Ireland Senior Hurling Championship (5): 1907, 1909, 1911, 1912, 1913
- Leinster Senior Hurling Championship (5): 1907, 1909, 1911, 1912, 1913

Leinster

- Railway Shield: 1907, 1908
