= 1966 All-Ireland Senior Hurling Championship final =

1966 All-Ireland Senior Hurling Final
- Event: 1966 All-Ireland Senior Hurling Championship
Cork	Kilkenny
3-9	1-10
- Date: 4 September 1966
- Venue: Croke Park, Dublin
- Referee: Jimmy Hatton (Wicklow)
- Attendance: 68,249

The 1966 All-Ireland Senior Hurling Championship Final was the 79th All-Ireland Final and the culmination of the 1966 All-Ireland Senior Hurling Championship, an inter-county hurling tournament for the top teams in Ireland. The match was held at Croke Park, Dublin, on 4 September 1966, between Cork and Kilkenny. The Leinster champions lost to their Munster opponents on a score line of 3–9 to 1-10.

== All-Ireland final ==
=== Overview ===
Sunday 4 September was the date of the 1966 All-Ireland senior hurling final between Cork and Kilkenny. It was Cork's first appearance in a final in ten years while Kilkenny were lining out in their first championship decider since 1964. Furthermore, it was the first championship meeting of these two great rivals in nineteen years.

In the build-up to the game there was speculation in the Cork camp that 45-year-old Christy Ring, the man regarded by players and commentators alike as the greatest player of all-time would come out of retirement to play on the Cork team. During his playing days he had won a record eight All-Ireland medals, however, this record was equaled by Tipperary’s John Doyle in 1965. While many saw it as an impossibility that Ring would play or even by named as a substitute, many more were determined that he should line out in an effort to capture a ninth winners’ medal. In the end Ring didn't play, and one of the youngest Cork teams of all-time turned out and they were firm underdogs compared to a vastly experienced Kilkenny side. The majority of the Cork team had never played in Croke Park before, while their captain, Gerald McCarthy, was still an under-21 player. For Kilkenny, Croke Park was a virtual home from home.

The weather on the day featured heavy showers before the match resulting in a greasy surface. Coupled with this was that there was also a strong breeze blowing up the field towards Hill 16.

Before the game itself there were some special celebrations to mark the golden jubilee of the Easter Rising in 1916. 500 survivors of the insurrection were specially invited by GAA Central Council to attend the game and, appropriately, they were seated in section R of the Hogan Stand. They were uniquely honoured when the Artane Boys Band played Pádraig Pearse’s song O Ró sé do bheatha bhaile prior to the national anthem.

=== Match report ===
With the pre-match festivities completed the game began. The opening minutes saw both sides fighting tooth and nail together with end to end action. The Kilkenny defence were put under pressure in the opening three minutes with goalkeeper Ollie Walsh making a number of great saves. In spite of this pressure from Cork it was John Teehan of Kilkenny who recorded the first score after four minutes. Eddie Keher converted a free shortly after to put Kilkenny two points ahead. Both sides shot four wides over the course of the next few minutes before Keher landed another free to give his team a three point lead. After sixteen minutes of play Cork registered their first score courtesy of a free by Seánie Barry. Keher and Barry shot two more wides for their respective teams shortly after, before the former converted two more points to give Kilkenny a five points to one point lead.

After twenty-two minutes Cork were awarded a free on the twenty-one yard line. Seánie Barry lined up to take it as Telefís Éireann commentator Michael O'Hehir wondered if he would be ‘satisfied with a point’. Barry went for a goal but it was stopped on the line and batted out, however, it was batted out to the waiting Colm Sheehan who sent the sliothar crashing to the Kilkenny net. In the space of a few minutes Cork were back in the game and only trailed by a single point after a long period of Kilkenny dominance. Eddie Keher increased this deficit to two points when he pointed another free on the twenty-five-minute mark. Shortly after the puck out the sliothar broke to Cork's Charlie McCarthy who recorded one of the scores of the day when his ground shot went straight over the bar for another point. Kilkenny fought back straight after the puck out as Pa Dillon went through for a goal. The sliothar ended up in the Cork net, however, the referee had blown his whistle for a free just a fraction of a second before the sliothar was struck. Seán Buckley restored Kilkenny's lead to two points as a result of the free before Justin McCarthy’s sideline cut when wide. Eddie Keher missed another point, however, less than a minute later he was clear for a goal, however, that too went wide. The half-time whistle sounded after Paddy Barry’s puck out with Kilkenny leading by 0–7 to 1–2.

Not long after the restart Cork leveled the scores courtesy of a Gerald McCarthy point and a pointed free from Seánie Barry. Kilkenny's sharpshooter Eddie Keher put his team a point ahead shortly after as he converted yet another free. For the second time in the game Cork took the upper hand against the run of play when Colm Sheehan captured his second goal of the game. In spite of all Kilkenny's dominance in the first-half Cork were now in the lead by 2–4 to 0–8. Seánie Barry stretched Cork's lead to three points in the forty-second minute of play before Eddie Keher scored his seventh point of the day to reduce the deficit to two points. Joe Dunphy narrowed the gap to the bare minimum with another point as the game turned into a tense affair once again. Just as Kilkenny were clawing their way back Cork got another run of luck against the run of play. A John O'Halloran shot hit off the crossbar and landed into the Kilkenny net to give Cork a third goal and a 3–5 to 0–10 lead.

Cork got a huge lift after this goal and registered three further unanswered points courtesy of one from Seánie Barry and two from Justin McCarthy. Kilkenny were not finished yet as Tom Walsh scored a late, late goal to give the score line some respectability, however, it was too late. Deep into injury time John Bennett captured the last score of the game as he gave Cork a 3–9 to 1–10 lead. The full-time whistle was blown immediately after the puck out and Cork had captured their twentieth All-Ireland title.

=== Statistics ===
1966-09-04
15:15 BST

Cork	3-9 – 1-10	Kilkenny
C. Sheehan (2-0), S. Barry (0-4), J. O’Halloran (1-0), J. McCarthy (0-2), C. McCarthy (0-1), G. McCarthy (0-1), J. Bennett (0-1).		E. Keher (0-7), T. Walsh (1-0), J. Teehan (0-1), S. Buckley (0-1), J. Dunphy (0-1).

Croke Park, Dublin
Attendance: 68,249
Referee: J. Hatton (Wicklow)

Cork	Kilkenny

Cork Team 1 Paddy Barry 2 Peter Doolan 3 Tom O'Donoghue 4 Dennis Murphy 5 Tony Connolly 6 Jerry O'Sullivan 7 Paddy Fitzgerald 8 Justin McCarthy 9 Fr Mick Waters 10 Fr Seanie Barry 11 John O'Halloran 12 Gerald McCarthy 13 Charlie McCarthy 14 Colm Sheehan 15 John Bennett Substitutes Finbarr O'Neill, Mick Lane, Ger O'Leary, Donal Sheehan, Ted O'Mahony, Con Roche Trainer Jim Tough Barry Selectors Willie Long Puck Murphy, Denis Hurley, Jim O'Regan, Dan Coughlan, Tony O'Shaughnessy

== Paths to the final ==
=== Cork ===
MSHC Quarter-final: Cork 3-8 – 3-8 Clare

Replay: Cork 5-11 – 1-7 Clare

MSHC Semi-final: Cork 2-6 – 1-7 Limerick

MSHC Final: Cork 4-9 – 2-9 Waterford

=== Kilkenny ===
LSHC Semi-final: Kilkenny 3-13 – 1-10 Offaly

LSHC Final: Kilkenny 1-15 – 2-6 Wexford
