= Dick Dunphy =

Irish hurler

Personal information
- Native name: Risteard Ó Donnchaidh (Irish)
- Born: 1939 Dunmore Road, Waterford, Ireland
- Died: November 2006 (aged 66–67) Dunmore Road, Waterford, Ireland
- Occupation: Farmer

Sport
- Sport: Hurling
- Position: Goalkeeper
Club
- Years: Club
- Mooncoin
Club titles
- Kilkenny titles: 1
Inter-county*
Years	County	Apps (scores)
1961–1966	Kilkenny	0 (0-00)
Inter-county titles
- Leinster titles: 0
- All-Irelands: 0
- NHL: 0
- *Inter County team apps and scores correct as of 19:11, 5 January 2014.

Richard Dunphy (1939 – November 2006) was an Irish hurler who played as a goalkeeper for the Kilkenny senior team.

Born in Waterford, Dunphy first arrived on the inter-county scene at the age of twenty-two when he first linked up with the Kilkenny senior team. He joined the senior panel during the 1961–62 league. Dunphy spent his entire career as understudy goalkeeper to Ollie Walsh, however, he won one Leinster medal and two National Hurling League medals as an unused substitute.

At club level Dunphy was a one-time championship medallist with Mooncoin.

Dunphy's father, Eddie, his uncles, Joe, William and Wattie, and his brother, Joe, all played for Kilkenny at different stages.

He retired from inter-county hurling following the conclusion of the 1966 championship.

In retirement from playing Dunphy became involved in the administrative affairs of the Gaelic Athletic Association, serving as treasurer and trustee with the Kilkenny County Board. He also served as a Fianna Fáil county councilor with Kilkenny County Council.

== Honours ==
=== Player ===
Mooncoin

- Kilkenny Senior Hurling Championship (1): 1965

Kilkenny

- Leinster Senior Hurling Championship (1): 1966 (sub)
- National Hurling League (2): 1961–62 (sub), 1965–66 (sub)
