= Dick Cantwell =

Irish hurler

Richard A. Cantwell (22 February 1898 – 22 May 1981) was an Irish hurler. Usually lining out as a goalkeeper, he was a member of the Kilkenny senior hurling team that won the 1926 Leinster Championship.

== Honours ==
Mooncoin

- Kilkenny Senior Hurling Championship (2): 1927, 1929

Kilkenny

- Leinster Senior Hurling Championship (1): 1926
