= Larry Duggan =

Irish hurler (1909-96)

Personal information
- Native name: Labhrás Ó Dúagáin (Irish)
- Born: 1 January 1909 Mullinavat, County Kilkenny, Ireland
- Died: 29 October 1996 (aged 87) Enniscorthy, County Wexford, Ireland
- Occupation: Electrical contractor

Sport
- Sport: Hurling
- Position: Right corner-forward
Clubs
- Years: Club
- Mooncoin; Mullinavat
Club titles
- Kilkenny titles: 2
Inter-county
- Years: County
- 1935-1937: Kilkenny
Inter-county titles
- Leinster titles: 3
- All-Irelands: 1
- NHL: 0

Laurence Duggan (1 January 1909 – 29 October 1996) was an Irish hurler who played for Kilkenny Senior Championship club Mooncoin. He played for the Kilkenny senior hurling team for three seasons, during which time he usually lined out as a right corner-forward. His brother, Jack Duggan, was a contemporary on the team.

== Honours ==
Mooncoin

- Kilkenny Senior Hurling Championship (2): 1932

Kilkenny

- All-Ireland Senior Hurling Championship (1): 1935
- Leinster Senior Hurling Championship (3): 1935, 1936, 1937
