= 1923 Kilkenny Senior Hurling Championship =

Annual hurling competition season

- Champions: Dicksboro (1st title); Matty Power (captain)
- Runners-up: Mooncoin; Wattie Dunphy (captain)

The 1923 Kilkenny Senior Hurling Championship was the 29th staging of the Kilkenny Senior Hurling Championship since its establishment by the Kilkenny County Board.

On 19 October 1924, Dicksboro won the championship after a 7–04 to 3–01 defeat of Mooncoin in the final. It was their first ever championship title.

== Results ==
=== Final ===
19 October 1924 Final	Dicksboro	7-04 - 3-01	Mooncoin	St. James's Park
