= Eddie Dunphy =

Irish hurler (1897–1977)

Personal information
- Native name: Éamonn Ó Donnchaidh (Irish)
- Born: 6 October 1897 Mooncoin, County Kilkenny, Ireland
- Died: 9 November 1977 (aged 80) Mooncoin, County Kilkenny, Ireland

Sport
- Sport: Hurling
- Position: Centre-forward
Club
- Years: Club
- Mooncoin
Club titles
- Kilkenny titles: 3
Inter-county
- Years: County
- 1922-1929: Kilkenny
Inter-county titles
- Leinster titles: 4
- All-Irelands: 1
- NHL: 0

Edmond "Eddie" Dunphy (6 October 1897 – 9 November 1977) was an Irish hurler who played as a centre-forward for the Kilkenny senior team.

Born in Mooncoin, County Kilkenny, Dunphy first arrived on the inter-county scene at the age of twenty-two when he first linked up with the Kilkenny senior team. He made his senior debut during the 1922 championship. Dunphy immediately became a regular member of the starting fifteen, and won one All-Ireland medal and four Leinster medals. He was an All-Ireland runner-up on one occasion.

At club level he was a three-time championship medallist with Mooncoin.

Dunphy's brothers, Joe, William and Wattie, as well as his sons, Dick and Joe Dunphy, Jnr, all played for Kilkenny at different stages.

He retired from inter-county hurling following the conclusion of the 1929 championship.

== Honours ==
=== Player ===
Mooncoin

- Kilkenny Senior Hurling Championship (1): 1928, 1929, 1932

Kilkenny

- All-Ireland Senior Hurling Championship (1): 1922
- Leinster Senior Hurling Championship (4): 1922, 1923, 1925, 1926
