= Joe Dunphy =

Irish hurler

Personal information
- Native name: Seosamh Ó Donnchaidh (Irish)
- Born: 1944 (age 81–82) Dunmore Road, Waterford, Ireland
- Height: 5 ft 7 in (170 cm)

Sport
- Sport: Hurling
- Position: Right corner-forward
Club
- Years: Club
- Mooncoin
Club titles
- Kilkenny titles: 1
Inter-county*
Years	County	Apps (scores)
1964–1966	Kilkenny	5 (2–3)
Inter-county titles
- Leinster titles: 1
- All-Irelands: 0
- NHL: 1
- *Inter County team apps and scores correct as of 19:11, 4 January 2014.

Joseph Dunphy (born 1944) is an Irish retired hurler who played as a right corner-forward for the Kilkenny senior team.

Born in Waterford, Dunphy first arrived on the inter-county scene at the age of seventeen when he first linked up with the Kilkenny minor team, before later joining the under-21 side. He joined the senior panel after the 1964 championship. Dunphy immediately became a regular member of the starting fifteen, and won one Leinster medal and one National Hurling League medal. He was an All-Ireland runner-up on one occasion.

As a member of the Leinster inter-provincial team on a number of occasions Dunphy won one Railway Cup medal as a non-playing substitute. At club level he is a one-time championship medallist with Mooncoin.

Dunphy's father, Eddie, his uncles, Joe, William and Wattie, and his brother, Dick, all played for Kilkenny at different stages.

Throughout his career Dunphy made 5 championship appearances. He retired from inter-county hurling following the conclusion of the 1967 championship.

In retirement from playing Dunphy became involved in team management and coaching. He was a selector with the Kilkenny All-Ireland-winning minor team in 2003.

== Playing career ==
=== Club ===
After a glittering underage career that yielded four minor championship medals in five years, Dunphy was still eligible for the minor team when he was added to the Mooncoin junior team in 1961. A huge 4–11 to 2–2 defeat of Coon gave him a championship medal in that grade.

By 1965 Dunphy was a key fixture on the Mooncoin senior team that qualified for the decider for the first time in a decade. Reigning champions Bennettsbridge provided the opposition, however, a narrow 2–8 to 1–8 victory gave Dunphy a Kilkenny Senior Hurling Championship medal.

=== Inter-county ===
Dunphy first played for Kilkenny in 1961 when he had the honour of captaining the team. A huge 4–12 to 0–7 defeat of Dublin gave him his first Leinster medal. The subsequent All-Ireland decider pitted Tipperary against Kilkenny. A 3–13 to 0–15 victory gave Dunphy an All-Ireland Minor Hurling Championship medal, while he also had the honour of lifting the Irish Press Cup.

In 1962 Dunphy was captain of the minor team once again. A narrow 5–7 to 5–4 defeat of Wexford gave him a second successive Leinster medal. For the second successive year Tipperary provided the opposition in the subsequent All-Ireland final. Goals were key as a 3–6 to 0–9 victory gave Dunphy his second All-Ireland medal. He remains the only player to captain back-to-back All-Ireland-winning teams.

Dunphy first joined the Kilkenny senior team in late 1964 during the Oireachtas Tournament. He was a regular during the subsequent National Hurling League campaign and made his senior championship debut on 27 June 1965 in a 1–20 to 3–8 Leinster semi-final defeat of Dublin.

In 1966 Dunphy collected his first silverware with the Kilkenny senior team. An aggregate 10–15 to 2–15 defeat of New York in the league decider gave him a National Hurling League medal. Dunphy later won a Leinster medal following a 1–15 to 2–6 defeat of reigning provincial champions Wexford. The subsequent All-Ireland final on 4 September 1966 pitted Kilkenny against Cork for the first time in nineteen years. Kilkenny were the red hot favourites, however, a hat-trick of goals by Colm Sheehan gave Cork a merited 3–9 to 1–10 victory.

=== Inter-provincial ===
Dunphy was added to the Leinster inter-provincial team in 1965. He was an unused substitute as Leinster beat arch rivals Munster by 3–11 to 0–9.

== Coaching career ==
In 2003 Dunphy was part of the selection team to the Kilkenny minor team. That year he helped steer the team to the Leinster title following an 0–18 to 0–13 defeat of Offaly. Kilkenny subsequently faced Galway in the All-Ireland decider. Richie Power gave a masterclass of hurling, including scoring the winning point deep into injury time, to secure a 2–16 to 2–15 victory.

Dunphy was still part of the managerial team again in 2004. Kilkenny retained the Leinster title that year following a heavy 1–15 to 1–4 defeat of Dublin. The subsequent All-Ireland decider pitted Kilkenny against Galway. Richie Hogan proved to be the hero for Kilkenny, as his point, a minute into injury time, earned "the Cats" a 1–18 to 3–12 draw. The replay a week later was also a close affair, with Galway just about holding off the Kilkenny challenge to win by 0–16 to 1–12.

== Honours ==
=== Player ===
Mooncoin

- Kilkenny Senior Hurling Championship (1): 1965
- Kilkenny Senior Hurling Championship (4): 1958, 1960, 1961, 1962

Kilkenny

- Leinster Senior Hurling Championship (1): 1966
- National Hurling League (1): 1965–66
- All-Ireland Minor Hurling Championship (2): 1961, 1962
- Leinster Minor Hurling Championship (2): 1961, 1962

Leinster

- Railway Cup (1): 1965 (sub)

=== Selector ===
Kilkenny

- All-Ireland Minor Hurling Championship (1): 2003
- Leinster Minor Hurling Championship (2): 2003, 2004

Achievements
Preceded by Billy Grace	All-Ireland Minor Hurling Final winning captain 1961–1962	Succeeded by Willie Bierney
