= Carrigeen GAA =

Irish Gaelic Athletic Association club

Carrigeen
- Founded: 1954
- County: Kilkenny
- Nickname: Cats
- Grounds: Asper Park
- Coordinates: 52°17′18″N 7°13′24″W

Playing kits
Standard colours

Carrigeen GAA is a Gaelic Athletic Association (GAA) club situated in Carrigeen in the far south of County Kilkenny, Ireland. The club was established in 1954 and its home grounds are at Asper Park. Carrigeen play in black and amber stripes.

== History ==
Founded in 1954, Carrigeen is (together with Mooncoin GAA) one of two clubs within the parish of Mooncoin.

The club grounds at Asper Park were officially opened in 1991 by Paddy Buggy of Slieverue, former president of the GAA. Speaking at the opening Nickey Brennan, then president elect of the GAA, said:

Carrigeen may be one of Kilkenny's smallest clubs but the opening of these fine grounds shows the dedication and spirit that exists in the local community. Many great games of hurling have already been played on these grounds over the past few years and we look forward to many more exciting clashes in the years ahead.

— - Nickey Brennan, President Elect of the GAA (official opening of the Carrigeen grounds, 1991)

As of 2008, the club was reportedly planning to spend €500,000 developing its grounds, with the National Lottery putting up €200,000, Kilkenny County Council €100,000, and the club raising the remaining €200,000.

As of 2019, Carrigeen was playing hurling in the Junior C grade.

== People ==
Bob O'Keeffe, after whom the trophy awarded for the Leinster Senior Hurling Championship is named, was a native of Glengrant townland, near Carrigeen in Mooncoin parish. O'Keeffe held several roles within GAA councils and was president of the association from 1935 to 1938. After his death, the GAA donated a trophy in his memory—the Bob O'Keeffe Memorial Cup. The hurler depicted on the top of the cup is barefoot—as O'Keeffe originally played in that manner.

== Honours ==
- Kilkenny Junior 'B' Hurling League: (1) 2015
- Southern Kilkenny Junior 'B' Hurling League: (1) 2015
