= 1919 Kilkenny Senior Hurling Championship =

Annual hurling competition season

- Champions: N/A
- Runners-up: N/A

The 1919 Kilkenny Senior Hurling Championship was the 28th staging of the Kilkenny Senior Hurling Championship since its establishment by the Kilkenny County Board.

The championship remains unfinished as the finalists - Tullaroan and Mooncoin - failed to agree on a venue for the final.
