= Ned Doyle =

Ned Doyle may refer to:

- Dan Doyle (footballer) (1864–1918), known as Ned, Scottish footballer
- James Edwin Doyle (1902–1989), known as Ned, American advertising executive
- Ned Doyle (hurler), Irish hurler
