= John Bennett (hurler) =

Irish hurler (1934–2016)

Personal information
- Native name: Seán Binéid (Irish)
- Born: 1934 Douglas, Cork, Ireland
- Died: 10 August 2016 (aged 84) Cork, Ireland
- Height: 5 ft 11 in (180 cm)

Sport
- Sport: Hurling
- Position: Left corner-forward
Clubs
- Years: Club
- Blackrock; Douglas; St Michael's
Club titles
- Cork titles: 2
Inter-county*
Years	County	Apps (scores)
1960–1968	Cork	12 (5–20)
Inter-county titles
- Munster titles: 1
- All-Irelands: 1
- NHL: 0
- *Inter County team apps and scores correct as of 22:45, 26 April 2015.

John Bennett (1934 – 10 August 2016) was an Irish hurler whose league and championship career with the Cork senior team spanned eight years from 1960 to 1968.

Born in Douglas on the south side of Cork city, Bennett moved from Douglas GAA to Blackrock GAA club in his youth, and he subsequently joined the Blackrock senior team. At club level, he won two Cork Senior Hurling Championship medals with Blackrock. As a Gaelic footballer he played with St Michael's of Blackrock, before finishing his club career with Douglas.

Bennett made his debut on the inter-county scene when he was added to the Cork senior panel for the 1960 All-Ireland Senior Hurling Championship. Over the next few years, he found it difficult to establish himself on the team, however, by 1966 he was a regular in the forward line. Bennett won a set of All-Ireland and Munster hurling medals that year. He played his last game for Cork in July 1968.

In 1965, Bennett lined out with the Munster inter-provincial team, however, he never won a Railway Cup medal.

In retirement from playing, Bennett became involved in team management and administrative affairs. He was a selector with the Blackrock senior team before serving as club chairman for six years. As a selector with the Cork senior team, Bennett helped guide the team to Munster and National Hurling League successes in 1972.

Bennett died on 10 August 2016.

== Playing career ==
=== Club ===
Although eligible to play with the Douglas club, Bennett transferred to Blackrock who were in the midst of a 25-year era without success. In 1954, he was at right wing-forward as Blackrock qualified for their first county final in six years. Blackrock fielded a young team, however, Glen Rovers had eight inter-county players on their team and held a 2-4 to 0-2 half-time lead. Bennett's side fought back after the interval with goals from Eddie John O'Sullivan, Tom Furlong and Seán Horgan, leaving the result in doubt up to the end. At the full-time whistle Blackrock were defeated by 3-7 to 3-2.

Two years later in 1956, Blackrock qualified for a second county final in three years, with Glen Rovers providing the opposition once again. The Glen were now regarded as a team in transition and were defeated by a Mick Cashman-captained Rockies on a scoreline of 2-10 to 2-2. It was Bennett's first Cork Senior Hurling Championship medal and a first for Blackrock since 1931.

After a six-point defeat by Glen Rovers in 1959, Blackrock were back in yet another county final in 1961. Blackrock played North Cork divisional side Avondhu and Blackrock were the champions by 4-10 to 3-7, with Bennett collecting a second championship medal.

=== Inter-county ===
Bennett first played for Cork as a member of the senior hurling team. He made his senior championship debut on 31 July 1960 when he came on as a substitute in Cork's 4-13 to 4-11 Munster final defeat by Tipperary.

A 4-9 to 2-9 defeat of Waterford in the 1966 provincial decider gave him his first Munster medal. The subsequent All-Ireland final on 4 September 1966 pitted Kilkenny against Cork for the first time in nineteen years. Kilkenny were the favourites, however, a hat-trick of goals from Colm Sheehan gave Cork a 3-9 to 1-10 victory over Kilkenny. Not only was it a first championship for Cork in twelve years, but it was Bennett's first All-Ireland medal.

Bennett retired from inter-county hurling following Cork's exit from the championship in 1968.

== Honours ==
=== Player ===
Blackrock

- Cork Senior Club Hurling Championship (2): 1956, 1961

Cork

- All-Ireland Senior Hurling Championship (1): 1966
- Munster Senior Hurling Championship (1): 1966
