= 1928 Kilkenny Senior Hurling Championship =

Annual hurling competition season

- Champions: Mooncoin (8th title); Wattie Dunphy (captain)
- Runners-up: Dicksboro; John Roberts (captain)

The 1928 Kilkenny Senior Hurling Championship was the 34th staging of the Kilkenny Senior Hurling Championship since its establishment by the Kilkenny County Board.

On 17 June 1928, Mooncoin won the championship after a 4–03 to 3–02 defeat of Dicksboro in the final. It was their eighth championship title overall and their second title in succession.

== Results ==
=== Final ===
17 June 1928 Final	Mooncoin	4-02 - 3-02	Dicksboro	Nowlan Park
