= 1909 Kilkenny Senior Hurling Championship =

Annual hurling competition season

- Champions: Erin's Own (4th title); Mick Leahy (captain)
- Runners-up: Mooncoin; Dick Walsh (captain)

The 1909 Kilkenny Senior Hurling Championship was the 21st staging of the Kilkenny Senior Hurling Championship since its establishment by the Kilkenny County Board.

On 1 May 1910, Erin's Own won the championship after a 1–12 to 1–07 defeat of Mooncoin in the final. This was their second championship title overall and their first in four championship seasons.

== Results ==
=== Final ===
1 May 1910 Final	Erin's Own	1-12 - 1-07	Mooncoin	Waterford Sportsfield
