= 1908 Kilkenny Senior Hurling Championship =

Annual hurling competition season

- Champions: Mooncoin (4th title); Ned Doyle (captain)
- Runners-up: Threecastles; Ned Hennessy (captain)

The 1908 Kilkenny Senior Hurling Championship was the 20th staging of the Kilkenny Senior Hurling Championship since its establishment by the Kilkenny County Board.

On 16 May 1909, Mooncoin won the championship after a 5–17 to 3–05 defeat of Threecastles in the final. This was their fourth championship title overall and their first in two championship seasons.

== Results ==
=== Final ===
16 May 1909 Final	Mooncoin	5-17 - 3-05	Threecastles	St. James's Park
