= Corluddy Castle =

Ruined castle in County Kilkenny, Ireland

Coordinates: 52°15′55″N 7°12′23″W

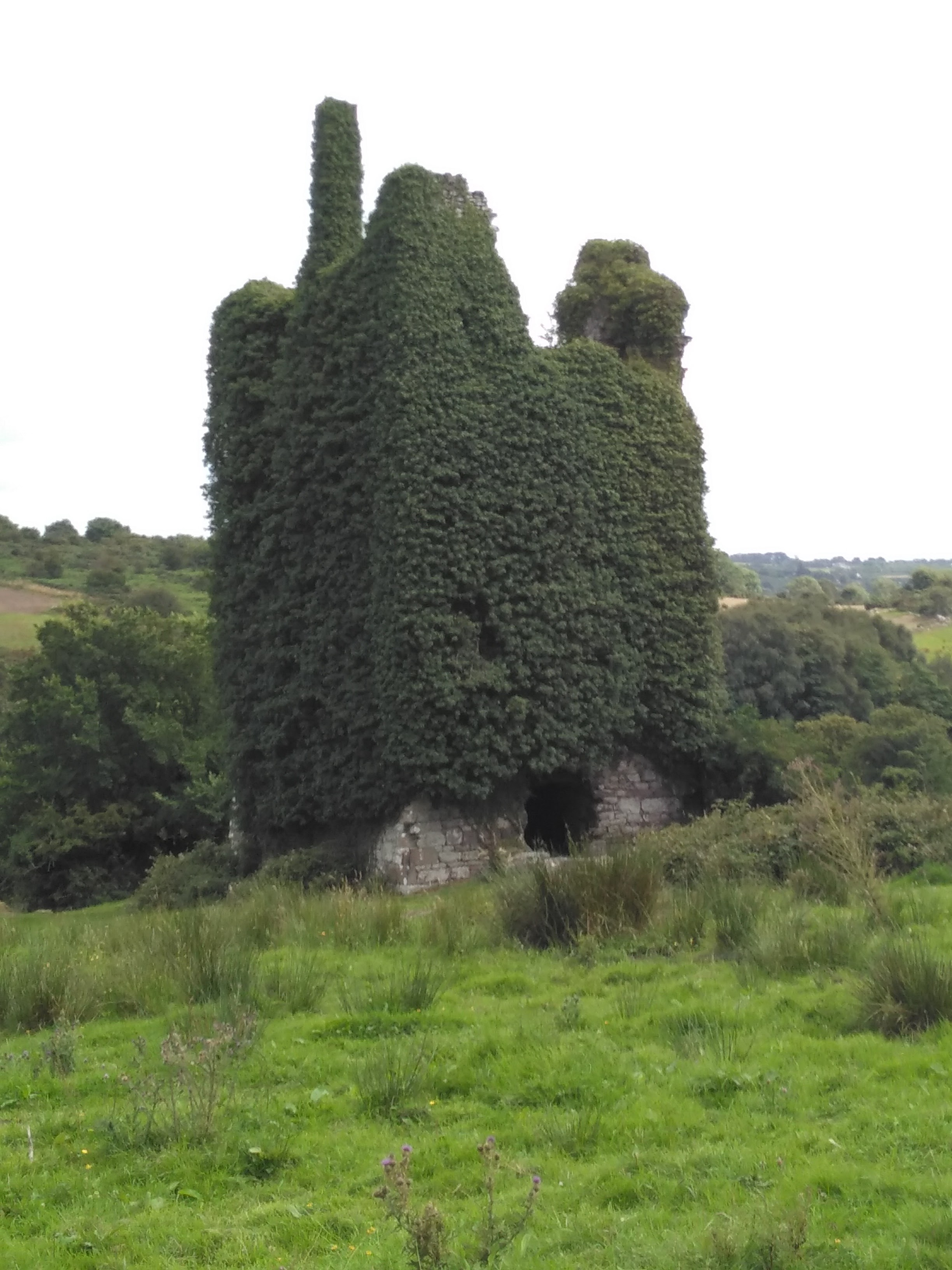
View of Corluddy Castle from the roadside

Corluddy Castle is a ruined Norman-era tower house close to the village of Carrigeen in County Kilkenny, Ireland. It is historically associated with the Grant family of the Barony of Iverk.

In The History and Antiquities of the Diocese of Ossory, published by the priest and historian William Carrigan in 1905, Corluddy Castle is described as "strongly built" but "roofless". Carrigan describes the location of the 5-story tower house, which was built "not on level ground, but on the sloping side of a hill", as "very unusual".

Writing in 1985, Owen O'Kelly states that the ruined castle was "in a good state of preservation, the bottom arch showing traces of osier-rod work. It is on an open hillside east of the village and belonged to the Grants until confiscated during the Cromwellian conquest of Ireland. Peter Grant, chief of the family, died 1510 and is buried in St. Canice's Cathedral".
