= 1906 Kilkenny Senior Hurling Championship =

Annual hurling competition season

- Champions: Mooncoin (3rd title); Pat Fielding (captain)
- Runners-up: Tullaroan; Jer Doheny (captain)

The 1906 Kilkenny Senior Hurling Championship was the 18th staging of the Kilkenny Senior Hurling Championship since its establishment by the Kilkenny County Board.

Mooncoin won the championship after being awarded the title by the County Board. They had earlier drawn with Tullaroan in the final. This was their third championship title overall and their first in six championship seasons.

== Results ==
=== Finals ===
6 May 1907 Final	Mooncoin	3-06 - 1-12	Tullaroan	St. James's Park

Final replay	Mooncoin	awarded title over	Tullaroan
