= Eddie Doyle (hurler) =

Irish hurler (1897–1948)

Personal information
- Native name: Éamonn Ó Dúghaill (Irish)
- Nickname: Ned
- Born: 1 February 1897 Mooncoin, County Kilkenny, Ireland
- Died: 9 May 1948 (aged 51) Mooncoin, County Kilkenny, Ireland

Sport
- Sport: Hurling
- Position: Half-back
Club
- Years: Club
- 1915-1934: Mooncoin
Club titles
- Kilkenny titles: 5
Inter-county
- Years: County
- 1925-1933: Kilkenny
Inter-county titles
- Leinster titles: 5
- All-Irelands: 2
- NHL: 1

Edmond Doyle (1 February 1897 – 9 May 1948) was an Irish sportsperson. He played hurling with his local club Mooncoin and with the Kilkenny senior inter-county team in the 1930s.

== Playing career ==
=== Club ===
Doyle played his club hurling with the famous Mooncoin club and enjoyed much success. He helped Mooncoin to a three-in-a-row of senior county titles in 1916, 1917 and 1918. In the absence of a senior championship Doyle still continued his winning ways ne capturing junior county medals in 1920 and 1922. He captured further senior county titles in 1927, 1928, 1929 and 1932. Doyle was captain of the team in the latter year. Although he had retired in 1935 Doyle returned the following year and played a significant role in Mooncoin’s county final victory. It was his seventh senior county triumph overall.

=== Inter-county ===
Doyle first came to prominence on the inter-county scene as a member of the Kilkenny senior inter-county team in the late 1920s. It would be 1931, however, before he first tasted success. That year he won his first Leinster title as Kilkenny won their first provincial title for the first time in five years. Kilkenny later played Cork in one of the most famous All-Ireland finals of all-time. The first game ended in a draw while the replay of this game also ended with both teams all square. After a third game between these two great rivals Cork won on a score line of 5-8 to 3-4. Doyle captured a second Leinster title in 1932 as Kilkenny retained their provincial crown. He later lined out in his second championship decider as Kilkenny faced Clare. A score line of 3-3 to 2-3 gave Kilkenny the victory and gave Doyle his first All-Ireland medal. In 1933 Doyle was captain of the Kilkenny team and he added a third consecutive Leinster medal to his collection. He later lined out in a third successive All-Ireland final. Limerick provided the opposition on that occasion, however, a 1-7 to 0-6 victory gave Kilkenny the championship title and gave Doyle a second All-Ireland medal. Doyle retired from inter-county hurling shortly after this victory.

== Personal life ==
Doyle married Mary Jo Flynn from Kilmacow at St. Patrick's Church in Kilkenny on 16 August 1932 and later lived in Mooncoin where he worked as a farmer. The couple had nine children.

== Death ==
On 9 May 1948, Doyle died aged 51 as a result of stomach cancer at Kilkenny County Hospital.

Sporting positions
Preceded by Jimmy Walsh	Kilkenny Senior Hurling Captain; 1933	Succeeded by Lory Meagher
Achievements
Preceded by Jimmy Walsh	All-Ireland Senior Hurling Final winning captain 1933	Succeeded by Timmy Ryan
