= Pat Fielding =

Irish hurler

Personal information
- Native name: Pádraig an Mhachaire (Irish)
- Born: 27 November 1875 Mooncoin, County Kilkenny, Ireland
- Died: 5 August 1959 (aged 83) Mooncoin, County Kilkenny, Ireland
- Occupation: Farmer

Sport
- Sport: Hurling
- Position: Midfield
Club
- Years: Club
- Mooncoin
Club titles
- Kilkenny titles: 1
Inter-county
- Years: County
- 1900-1904: Kilkenny
Inter-county titles
- Leinster titles: 3
- All-Irelands: 1

Pat Fielding (27 November 1875 – 5 August 1959) was an Irish hurler who played as a midfielder for the Kilkenny senior team.

Fielding made his first appearance for the team during the 1900 championship and was a regular member of the starting for the next few seasons until his retirement after the 1904 championship. During that time he won one All-Ireland medal and three Leinster medals.
