= 1936 Kilkenny Senior Hurling Championship =

Annual hurling competition season

- Champions: Mooncoin (11th title); Tommy Carroll (captain)
- Runners-up: Tullaroan; Lory Meagher (captain)

The 1936 Kilkenny Senior Hurling Championship was the 42nd staging of the Kilkenny Senior Hurling Championship since its establishment by the Kilkenny County Board.

Mooncoin won the championship after a 4–02 to 4–01 victory over Tullaroan in the final. It was their 11th championship title overall and their first title in four championship seasons.

== Results ==
=== Final ===
| 22 November 1936 Final | Mooncoin | 4-02 - 4-01 | Tullaroan | Nowlan Park |
