= The Rose of Mooncoin =

The Rose of Mooncoin is a ballad written in the 19th century by local schoolteacher and poet Watt Murphy, who was catholic, who met and gradually fell in love with a local Protestant girl called Elizabeth, also known as Molly, and set in Mooncoin, Ireland. Elizabeth was just 20 years old, and Watt was then 56, but the difference in age was of no consequence to either of them. Both were intellectuals, and they would often stroll along the banks of the River Suir, composing and reciting poetry. However, Elizabeth's father, who was the local vicar, did not approve of their relationship, and she was sent away to England. Watt was brokenhearted at the loss of his beloved lady, and wrote this song in her memory.

It has been recorded by, amongst others, Marika, Anna McGoldrick, Daniel O'Donnell, Paddy Reilly, Patsy Watchorn, Phil Coulter, Johnny McEvoy and The Wolfe Tones. However, many music lovers have heralded the finest version to be that of Mooncoin's own Darren Holden.

== Lyrics ==
"How sweet 'tis to roam by the sunny Suir stream,
And hear the dove's coo 'neath the morning's sunbeam.
Where the thrush and the robin their sweet notes combine
On the banks of the Suir that flows down by Mooncoin.

Flow on, lovely river, flow gently along.
By your waters so sweet sounds the lark's merry song.
On your green banks I'll wander where first I did join
With you, lovely Molly, the Rose of Mooncoin.

Oh Molly, dear Molly, it breaks my fond heart,
To know that we two for ever must part
I will think of you, Molly, while sun and moon shines
On the banks of the Suir that flows down by Mooncoin..."
