= 1888 Kilkenny Senior Hurling Championship =

Annual hurling competition season

- Teams: 12
- Champions: Mooncoin (1st title); Pat Walsh (captain)
- Runners-up: Confederation

The 1888 Kilkenny Senior Hurling Championship was the second staging of the Kilkenny Senior Hurling Championship since its establishment by the Kilkenny County Board.

On 29 April 1888, Mooncoin won the championship after a 2–02 to 0–00 defeat of Confederation in the final.

== Results ==
=== Final ===
29 April 1888 Final	Mooncoin	2-02 - 0-00	Confederation	Kilkenny
