= 1929 Kilkenny Senior Hurling Championship =

Annual hurling competition season

- Champions: Mooncoin (9th title); Wattie Dunphy (captain)
- Runners-up: Carrickshock; Willie Kelly (captain)

The 1929 Kilkenny Senior Hurling Championship was the 35th staging of the Kilkenny Senior Hurling Championship since its establishment by the Kilkenny County Board.

On 8 December 1929, Mooncoin won the championship after a 5–01 to 3–03 defeat of first-time finalists Carrickshock in a final replay at Nowlan Park. It was their ninth championship title overall while they also became the first team to win three successive championships.

== Results ==
=== Finals ===
24 November 1929 Final	Mooncoin	3-02 - 3-02	Carrickshock	Nowlan Park

8 December 1929 Final replay	Mooncoin	5-01 - 3-03	Carrickshock	Nowlan Park
