= Killinaspick =

Killinaspick Coill an Easpaig
- Village
- Location in Ireland
- Coordinates: 52°21′08″N 7°15′21″W
- Country: Ireland
- Province: Leinster
- County: County Kilkenny
- Time zone: UTC+0 (WET)
  - Summer (DST): UTC-1 (IST (WEST))
- Website: www.kilkennycoco.ie/eng/

Killinaspick (Irish: Coill an Easpaig, meaning 'bishop's wood') is a small village in the south of County Kilkenny, Ireland. Its name is also sometimes spelt Killinaspic, Killnaspic or Kilnaspic.

Killinaspick is situated in the north of Mooncoin parish. It borders the parishes of Mullinavat, Piltown and Kilmacow.

Killinaspick Catholic church is situated on the slope of the Walsh hills overlooking the parish. It was built in the mid-19th century. A tablet in the gable end of the current building, which stands south of the ancient site, states that it was built in 1866. Killinaspick church replaced the old church and graveyard in the adjoining hamlet called Tubrid. The church is one of three in the parish of Mooncoin, the other two being at Mooncoin itself and Carigeen.

The main focus of the village is the crossroads, from which Tubrid Road leads to the village church and graveyard by a bridge over a stream. A missionary stone and Millennium plaque is located near the bridge.

The village used to have a local shop, run by the Aylward family, but this closed in the early 1980s.

== See also ==
- List of towns and villages in Ireland
