= 1900 Kilkenny Senior Hurling Championship =

Annual hurling competition season

- Teams: 5
- Champions: Mooncoin (2nd title); Tom Quinn (captain)
- Runners-up: Freshford; Jack Grace (captain)

The 1900 Kilkenny Senior Hurling Championship was the 12th staging of the Kilkenny Senior Hurling Championship since its establishment by the Kilkenny County Board.

Mooncoin won the championship after a 5–09 to 1–15 defeat of Freshford in the final. This was their second championship title overall and their first in 12 championship seasons.
