= 1916 Kilkenny Senior Hurling Championship =

Annual hurling competition season

- Champions: Mooncoin (6th title); Ned Doyle (captain)
- Runners-up: Tullaroan; Dick Grace (captain)

The 1916 Kilkenny Senior Hurling Championship was the 27th staging of the Kilkenny Senior Hurling Championship since its establishment by the Kilkenny County Board.

On 24 August 1919, Mooncoin won the championship after a 5–02 to 2–03 defeat of Tullaroan in a final replay. This was their sixth championship title overall and their first title in three championship seasons.

Political troubles at the time meant that the championship was not completed until 1919. The Kilkenny County Board decided to also award the winners of the 1916 championship as winners of both the 1917 and 1918 county championship.

== Results ==
=== Final ===
29 June 1919 Final	Mooncoin	4-01 - 4-01	Tullaroan	Knocktopher

24 August 1919 Final replay	Mooncoin	5-02 - 2-03	Tullaroan	Knocktopher
