= 1927 Kilkenny Senior Hurling Championship =

Annual hurling competition season

- Champions: Mooncoin (7th title)
- Runners-up: James Stephens

The 1927 Kilkenny Senior Hurling Championship was the 33rd staging of the Kilkenny Senior Hurling Championship since its establishment by the Kilkenny County Board.

It took four games, including three replays, to decide the title. On 22 September 1928, Mooncoin won the championship after a 2–04 to 2–02 defeat of James Stephens in the final. It was their seventh championship title overall and their first title since 1916.

== Results ==
=== Final ===
22 September 1928 Final fourth replay	Mooncoin	2-04 - 2-02	James Stephens	Nowlan Park
