= 2021 Kilkenny Junior Hurling Championship =

- Dates: 26 September – 14 November 2021
- Sponsor: JJ Kavanagh and Sons
- Champions: Mooncoin (7th title)
- Runners-up: Tullogher-Rosbercon

The 2021 Kilkenny Junior Hurling Championship was the 111th staging of the Kilkenny Junior Hurling Championship since its establishment by the Kilkenny County Board in 1905. The championship began on 26 September 2021 and ended on 14 November 2021.

The final was played on 14 November 2021 at UPMC Nowlan Park in Kilkenny, between Mooncoin and Tullogher-Rosbercon, in what was their first ever meeting in a final. Mooncoin won the match by 3-19 to 3-11 to claim their seventh championship title overall and a first title in five years.

== Team changes ==
=== To Championship ===
Relegated from the Kilkenny Intermediate Hurling Championship

- St. Patrick's, Ballyragget

=== From Championship ===
Promoted to the Kilkenny Intermediate Hurling Championship

- Conahy Shamrocks

== Results ==
=== Semi-finals ===
30 October 2021 Semi-final	Slieverue	0-13 - 6-13	Mooncoin	UPMC Nowlan Park

30 October 2021 Semi-final	Tullogher-Rosbercon	0-27 - 2-14	James Stephens	UPMC Nowlan Park

=== Final ===
14 November 2021 Final	Mooncoin	3-19 - 3-11	Tullogher-Rosbercon	UPMC Nowlan Park
	P Walsh (0-7, 0-4f), J Delahunty (1-1), A Croke, C Quilty (1-0 each), M O'Neill, S Gannon (0-3 each), K Hogan (0-2), P Henebery (0-2, 0-1f, 0-1 65), J Fitzgerald (0-1)	Report	C O'Donoghue (1-6, 0-4f), C Hennessey, W Walsh (1-2 each), P Hartley (0-1)	Referee: S Cleere (O'Loughlin Gaels)
