= 1932 Kilkenny Senior Hurling Championship =

Annual hurling competition season

- Champions: Mooncoin (10th title); Eddie Doyle (captain)
- Runners-up: Carrickshock; Willie Kelly (captain)

The 1932 Kilkenny Senior Hurling Championship was the 38th staging of the Kilkenny Senior Hurling Championship since its establishment by the Kilkenny County Board.

On 13 November 1932, Mooncoin won the championship after a 6–04 to 5–05 defeat of Carrickshock in the final. It was their 10th championship title overall and their first title in three championship seasons.

== Results ==
=== Final ===
| 13 November 1932 Final | Mooncoin | 6-04 - 5-05 | Carrickshock | Nowlan Park, Kilkenny |
