= Carrigeen =

Village in County Kilkenny, Ireland

Carrigeen Carraigín
- Village
- Location in Ireland
- Coordinates: 52°16′16″N 7°12′58″W
- Country: Ireland
- Province: Leinster
- County: County Kilkenny
- Time zone: UTC+0 (WET)
  - Summer (DST): UTC-1 (IST (WEST))

Carrigeen (Irish: Carraigín, meaning 'little rock') is a village to the south-east of Mooncoin in County Kilkenny, Ireland. Carrigeen is situated on a hillock within the Suir Valley. Within the village is St. Kevin's Church (in the Catholic parish of Mooncoin) and a national (primary) school. The grounds of Carrigeen GAA club are nearby.

== History ==
Evidence of ancient settlement in the area includes a number of fulacht fiadh, megalithic tomb and ring barrow sites in the townlands of Luffany, Licketstown, Ballygorey, Ballinlough and Corluddy. Carrigeen village is also close to settlements at Licketstown and Glengrant, which date to Norman times.

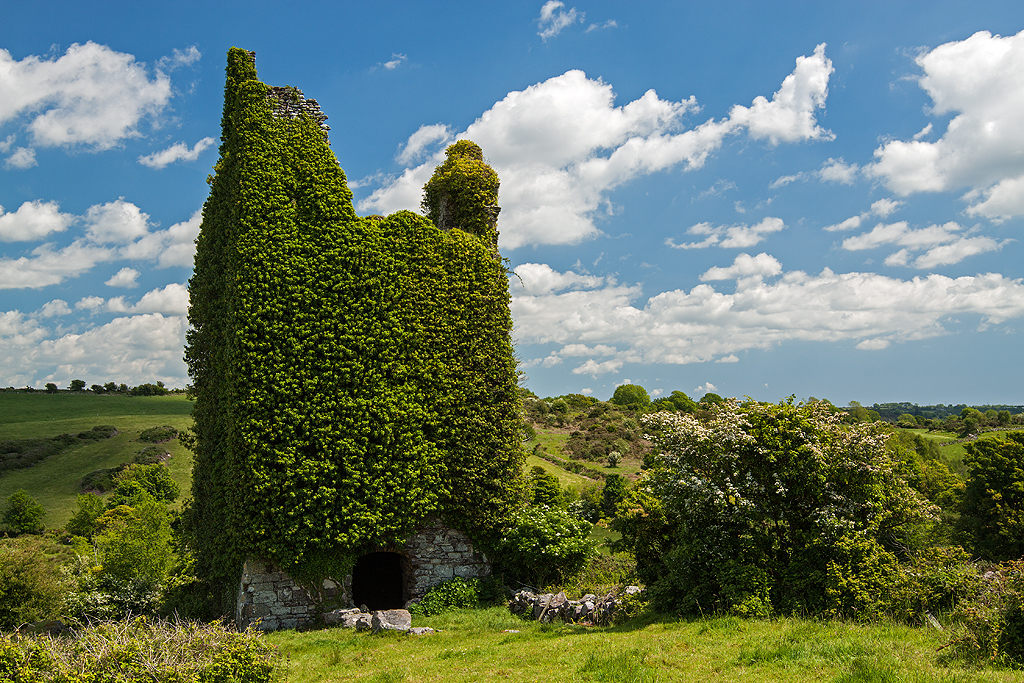
Corluddy Castle lies southeast of Carrigeen village

Other local historic landmarks include Grannagh and Corluddy Castle (from Cor loda meaning 'round hill of the mine'). Corluddy Castle is a Norman-era tower house, the ruins of which are on a hill to the southeast of the village overlooking the River Suir. The Grant family, who were landlords of Glengrant townland, lived there until the Cromwellian invasion of Ireland (1649).

St. Kevin's Church in Carrigeen was built in 1893. It is one of three churches in the Catholic parish of Mooncoin, together with a church in Killinaspick and Mooncoin.

== Geography ==
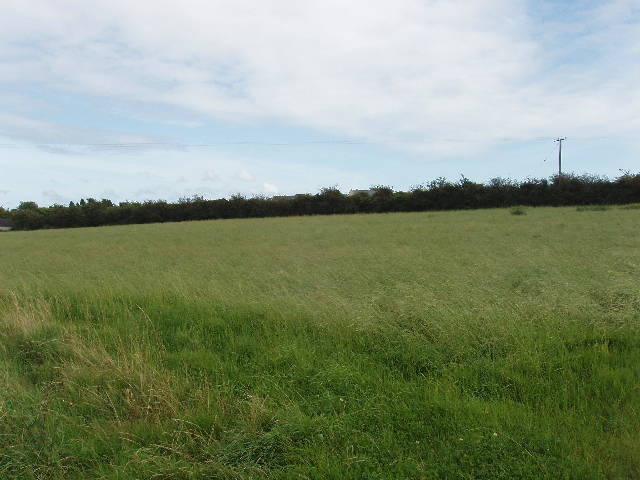
Field near Carrigeen village

Carrigeen is situated on a hillock within the Suir Valley. It overlooks parts of south County Kilkenny as well as Slievenamon, Tory Hill and the Comeragh Mountains.

== Education ==
Carrigeen National School celebrated its centenary in September 2000. The national school is the third school to serve the area, with Clashroe and the present community hall adjoining the churchyard previously used as schools. Carrigeen may originally have had a hedge school at Portnascully (from Port na Scoile meaning 'moat of the school') where a travelling master may have taught. As of 2024, there were 124 pupils enrolled in Carrigeen National School.

== Sport ==
Carrigeen GAA club was formed in 1954. Asper Park, the club grounds, was officially opened in 1991 by Paddy Buggy of Slieverue, former president of the GAA. Nickey Brennan, who was then president elect of the GAA, also attended the opening. Carrigeen play in black and amber stripes. As of 2019, the club was playing hurling in the Junior C grade.

== See also ==
- List of towns and villages in Ireland
