= James B. Dollard =

Roman catholic priest and poet (1872–1946)

James Bernard Dollard
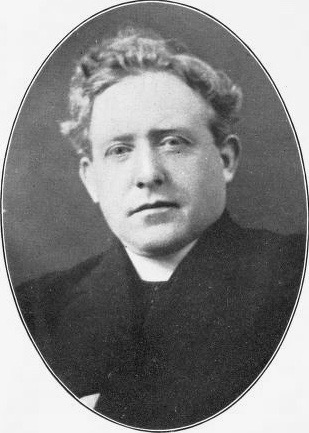
- Born: August 30, 1872; Mooncoin, County Kilkenny, Ireland
- Died: 1946 (aged 73–74)
- Education: Laval University
- Occupations: Poet, Priest
- Writing career
- Pen name: Sliav-na-mon

Ecclesiastical career
- Religion: Christianity
- Church: Roman Catholic Church
- Ordained: December 1896
- Congregations served: St. Helen's Church, Toronto; St. Mary's Church, Toronto; St. Columbkille's Church, Orillia; St. Monica's Church, North Toronto

Rev. James Bernard Dollard ("Father Dollard") (1872–1946) was a Roman Catholic parish priest and noted poet.

== Life ==
He was born at Mooncoin, County Kilkenny, Ireland, 30 August 1872, to Michael and Anastasia (Quinn) Dollard, the youngest son in a large family. After taking the course in Classics at Kilkenny College, he sailed in 1890 for New Brunswick, Canada. He graduated from the Grand Seminary of Montreal and received from Laval University the degrees of Bachelor of Theology and Bachelor of Canon Law. The same university conferred on him in 1916, the honorary degree of Litt.D. He was ordained to the priesthood in December 1896. He served as a curate in St. Helen's Church, and St. Mary's Church, Toronto, and for nine years, parish priest of Uptergrove, Ontario before he became the parish priest of St. Monica's Church, North Toronto.

He published two volumes of poems Irish Mist and Sunshine (1902) and Poems (1910), and a volume of short stories entitled The Gaels of Moondharrig. He sometimes wrote under the pseudonym of Sliav-na-mon.

In a lecture on "The War and the Poets," delivered in Toronto, 1916, Mr. Joyce Kilmer, poetry editor of the Literary Digest, declared that Father Dollard's sonnet was the best poem that had appeared on the death of Rupert Brooke.

He died in 1946.
