= 1961 All-Ireland Minor Hurling Championship =

All-Ireland Minor Hurling Championship 1961
All Ireland Champions
- Winners: Kilkenny (6th win)
- Captain: Joe Dunphy

All Ireland Runners-up
- Runners-up: Tipperary
- Captain: Noel Horgan

Provincial Champions
- Munster: Tipperary
- Leinster: Kilkenny
- Ulster: Antrim
- Connacht: Not Played

The 1961 All-Ireland Minor Hurling Championship was the 31st staging of the All-Ireland Minor Hurling Championship since its establishment by the Gaelic Athletic Association in 1928.

Kilkenny entered the championship as the defending champions.

On 3 September 1961 Kilkenny won the championship following a 3-13 to 0-15 defeat of Tipperary in the All-Ireland final. This was their second All-Ireland title in-a-row and their sixth title overall.

== Results ==
=== Leinster Minor Hurling Championship ===
30 July 1961 Final	Kilkenny	4-12 - 0-7	Dublin	Croke Park, Dublin

=== Munster Minor Hurling Championship ===
30 July 1961 Final	Tipperary	7-11 - 1-6	Cork	Gaelic Grounds, Limerick
				Referee: S Gleeson (Limerick)

=== Ulster Minor Hurling Championship ===
30 July 1961 Final	Donegal	4-4 - 11-5	Antrim	MacCumhaill Park, Ballybofey

=== All-Ireland Minor Hurling Championship ===
Semi-final

13 August 1961 Semi-final	Antrim	1-0 - 3-12	Tipperary	Casement Park, Belfast
				Referee: C Foley

Final

3 September 1961 Final	Kilkenny	3-13 - 0-15	Tipperary	Croke Park, Dublin
	P Freaney 1-4, T Walsh 1-4, M Aylward 1-0, T Barry 0-3, J Delaney 0-1, D Kinsella 0-1.		W Ryan 0-12, M Keating 0-3.	Referee: C Foley
