= 1913 Kilkenny Senior Hurling Championship =

Annual hurling competition season

- Champions: Mooncoin (5th title); Dick Walsh (captain)
- Runners-up: Tullaroan; Sim Walton (captain)

The 1913 Kilkenny Senior Hurling Championship was the 24th staging of the Kilkenny Senior Hurling Championship since its establishment by the Kilkenny County Board.

On 12 October 1913, Mooncoin won the championship after a 5–07 to 3–04 defeat of Tullaroan in the final. This was their fifth championship title overall and their first in five championship seasons.

== Results ==
=== Final ===
12 October 1913 Final	Mooncoin	5-07 - 3-04	Tullaroan	Waterford Sportsfield
