= Ned Doyle (hurler) =

Irish hurler

Personal information
- Native name: Éamonn Ó Dúghaill (Irish)
- Nickname: Ned
- Born: 28 August 1877 Mooncoin, County Kilkenny, Ireland
- Died: Unknown
- Occupation: Farmer

Sport
- Sport: Hurling
- Position: Centre-forward
Club
- Years: Club
- Mooncoin
Club titles
- Kilkenny titles: 2
Inter-county
- Years: County
- 1903-1912: Kilkenny
Inter-county titles
- Leinster titles: 5
- All-Irelands: 6

Edmond Doyle (born 28 August 1877) was an Irish hurler who played as a defender as a forward for the Kilkenny senior team.

Doyle made his first appearance for the team during the 1903 championship and was a regular member of the starting for the next few seasons until his retirement after the 1912 championship. During that time he won six All-Ireland medals and five Leinster medals.

At club level Doyle was a two-time county championship medalist with Mooncoin.
