= 1966 All-Ireland Senior Hurling Championship =

Championship details
- Dates: 15 May – 4 September 1966
- Teams: 13

All-Ireland champions
- Winning team: Cork (20th win)
- Captain: Gerald McCarthy

All-Ireland Finalists
- Losing team: Kilkenny
- Captain: Jim Lynch

Provincial champions
- Munster: Cork
- Leinster: Kilkenny
- Ulster: Not Played
- Connacht: Not Played

Championship statistics
- No. matches played: 13
- Top Scorer: Seánie Barry (3–23)
- Player of the Year: Justin McCarthy
- All-Star Team: See here

The 1966 All-Ireland Senior Hurling Championship was the 80th staging of the All-Ireland Senior Hurling Championship, the Gaelic Athletic Association's premier inter-county hurling tournament. The championship ran from 15 May 1966 to 4 September 1966.

Tipperary entered the championship as the defending champions, however, they were beaten by Limerick in the Munster quarter-finals.

The All-Ireland final was played on 4 September 1996 at Croke Park in Dublin, between Cork and Kilkenny, in what was their 14th meeting in the final overall and a first meeting in the final in 19 years. Cork won the match by 3–09 to 1–10 to claim their 20th All-Ireland title overall and a first title in 12 years.

Cork's Seánie Barry was the championship's top scorer with 3–23. Cork's Justin McCarthy was the choice for Texaco Hurler of the Year.

== Leinster Senior Hurling Championship ==
=== Leinster first round ===
15 May 1966 First round	Carlow	1–16 – 1–11	Laois	Dr Cullen Park
	J. Mitchell (1–2), L. Walsh (0–5), J. Walsh (0–3), M. Morrissey (0–2), T. Coburn (0–2), E. Walsh (0–1), P. McNally (0–1).		C. O'Brien (1–2), J. Conroy (0–3), S. Cashin (0–2), J. Holohan (0–1), G. Cuddy (0–1), J. Lynas (0–1), N. Kelly (0–1).

29 May 1966 First round	Westmeath	2–06 – 10-09	Offaly	Cusack Park
	T. Ring (1–2), P. Loughlin (1–2), S. Bolger (0–1), P. Fagan (0–1).		P. Molloy (3–4), T. Dooley (2–0), W. Gorman (2–0), E. Fox (1–2), B. Johnston (1–1), P. Mulhaire (1–0), M. Kirwan (0–1), T. Moylan (0–1).	Referee: P Johnston (Kilkenny)

=== Leinster second round ===
12 June 1966 Second round	Offaly	5–11 – 5-05	Carlow	O'Moore Park
	T. Dooley (4–0), P. Molloy (1–5), W. Gorman (0–2), P. Mulhaire (0–1), P. Spellman (0–1), M. Kirwan (0–1), J. Hernon (0–1).		L. Walsh (2–3), J. Mitchell (2–0), N. Gladney (1–0), L. Morrissey (0–1), P. McNally (0–1).	Referee: P Johnston (Kilkenny)

=== Leinster semi-finals ===
19 June 1966 Semi-final	Wexford	3–18 – 4-05	Dublin	Nowlan Park
	R. Shannon (1–5), C. Jacob (1–2), J. O'Brien (0–5), S. Barron (1–0), W. Murphy (1–0 own goal, 0–3), M. Lyng (0–2), C. Dowdall (0–1).		F. Whelan (1–1), D. McPartland (1–0), P. Croke (1–0), A. Boothman (0–2), B. Galvin (0–1), E. Malone (0–1).	Referee: P Buggy (Kilkenny)

3 July 1966 Semi-final	Offaly	0–10 – 3–13	Kilkenny	St. Brendan's Park
	P. Molloy (0–5), W. Gorman (0–2), S. Moylan (0–1), P. Mulhaire (0–1), J. J. Healion (0–1).		E. Keher (0–9), T. Walsh (2–0), T. O'Connell (1–0), S. Buckley (0–2), P. Morgan (0–2).	Referee: E Kelly (Laois)

=== Leinster final ===
17 July 1966 Final	Kilkenny	1–15 – 2-06	Wexford	Croke Park
	E. Keher (0–6), J. Dunphy (1–2), C. Dunne (0–2), J. Teehan (0–2), S. Cleere (0–1), P. Carroll (0–1), S. Buckley (0–1).		C. Jacob (1–1), S. Whelan (1–0), R. Shannon (0–3), J. O'Brien (0–2).	Referee: B Smyth (Meath)

== Munster Senior Hurling Championship ==
=== Munster quarter-finals ===
6 June 1966 Quarter-final	Limerick	4–12 – 2-09	Tipperary	Cork Athletic Grounds
	E. Cregan (3–5), T. Bluett (1–1), K. Long (0–2), M. Savage (0–2), A. Dunworth (0–1), B. Hartigan (0–1).		S. McLoughlin (1–0), J. McKenna (1–0), L. Devaney (0–2), M. Keating (0–1), D. Nealon (0–1), J. Doyle (0–1), M. Burns (0–1), L. Gaynor (0–1), T. English (0–1), P. Doyle (0–1).	Referee: C Conway (Cork)

19 June 1966 Quarter-final	Cork	3–08 – 3-08	Clare	Gaelic Grounds
	J. McCarthy (1–0), D. Sheehan (1–0), J. O'Halloran (1–0), P. Harte (0–3), S. Barry (0–3), C. Sheehan (0–1), C. Roche (0–1).		P. Cronin (1–5), N. Pyne (1–3), M. O'Shea (1–0).	Referee: P Ryan (Tipperary)

3 July 1966 Quarter-final replay	Cork	5–11 – 1-07	Clare	Gaelic Grounds
	S. Barry (1–6), C. McCarthy (1–2), C. Sheehan (1–2), J. McCarthy (1–1), D. Sheehan (1–0).		N. Jordan (1–3), P. Henehy (0–2), P. Cronin (0–2).	Referee: T Foran (Tipperary)

=== Munster semi-finals ===
3 July 1966 Semi-final	Waterford	2–16 – 1-09	Galway	Gaelic Grounds
	J. Kirwan (1–4), F. Walsh (0–7), W. Walsh (1–0), T. Cheasty (0–3), M. Murphy (0–1), L. Guinan (0–1).		B. Lally (1–2), M. Fox (0–3), J. Conroy (0–3), T. Mitchell (0–1).	Referee: T Fitzgerald (Limerick)

10 July 1966 Semi-final	Cork	2–06 – 1-07	Limerick	FitzGerald Stadium
	S. Barry (1–4), C. McCarthy (1–0), G. McCarthy (0–2).		B. Hartigan (0–5), T. Bluett (1–0), E. Cregan (0–1), A. O'Brien (0–1).	Referee: T Foran (Limerick)

=== Munster final ===
24 July 1966 Final	Cork	4–09 – 2-09	Waterford	Gaelic Grounds
	S. Barry (1–6), J. Bennett (2–1), J. McCarthy (0–1), C. Sheehan (0–1).		V. Connors (1–0), L. Guinan (1–0), F. Walsh (0–3), T. Cheasty (0–3), D. Mahon (0–2), J. Condon (0–1).	Referee: G Fitzgerald (Limerick)

== All-Ireland Senior Hurling Championship ==
=== All-Ireland final ===
4 September 1966 Final	Cork	3–09 – 1–10	Kilkenny	Croke Park, Dublin
	C. Sheehan (3–0), S. Barry (0–4), J. McCarthy (0–2), C. McCarthy (0–1), G. McCarthy (0–1), J. Bennett (0–1).		E. Keher (0–7), T. Walsh (1–0), J. Teehan (0–1), S. Buckley (0–1), J. Dunphy (0–1).	Attendance: 68,249; Referee: J Hatton (Wicklow)

== Championship statistics ==
=== Miscellaneous ===
- Tipperary's defeat by Limerick in the first round of the Munster championship was the team's first defeat since the provincial decider of 1963. It also put an end to Tipperary's hopes of capturing a third All-Ireland title in-a-row.
- Prior to the Munster semi-final between Limerick and Cork there was a minute's silence in memory of Dr. Rogers, Bishop of Killaloe, who died the previous day.
- In the Leinster semi-final Wexford's Willie Murphy scores a remarkable own-goal for Dublin.

== Roll of Honour ==
- Tipperary – 21 (1965)
- Cork – 20 (1966)
- Kilkenny – 15 (1963)
- Limerick – 6 (1940)
- Dublin – 6 (1938)
- Wexford – 4 (1960)
- Waterford – 2 (1959)
- Galway – 1 (1923)
- Laois – 1 (1915)
- Clare – 1 (1914)
- London – 1 (1901)
- Kerry – 1 (1891)

== Top scorers ==
=== Season ===
Rank	Player	County	Tally	Total	Matches	Average
1	Seánie Barry	Cork	3–23	32	5	6.40
2	Paddy Molloy	Offaly	4–14	26	3	8.66
3	Eddie Keher	Kilkenny	0–22	22	3	7.33
4	Tony Dooley	Offaly	6–0	18	3	6.00
5	Colm Sheehan	Cork	4–4	16	5	3.20
6	Éamonn Cregan	Limerick	3–6	15	2	7.50
7	Liam Walsh	Carlow	2–8	14	2	7.00
8	John Mitchell	Carlow	3–2	11	2	5.50
8	Dick Shannon	Wexford	1–8	11	2	5.50
10	Justin McCarthy	Cork	2–4	10	5	2.00
10	Willie Gorman	Offaly	2–4	10	3	3.33
10	Pat Cronin	Clare	1–7	10	2	5.00
10	Frankie Walsh	Waterford	0–10	10	2	5.00

=== Single game ===
Rank	Player	County	Tally	Total	Opposition
1	Éamonn Cregan	Limerick	3–5	14	Tipperary
2	Paddy Molloy	Offaly	3–4	13	Westmeath
3	Tony Dooley	Offaly	4–0	12	Carlow
4	Colm Sheehan	Cork	3–0	9	Kilkenny
4	Liam Walsh	Carlow	2–3	9	Offaly
4	Seánie Barry	Cork	1–6	9	Clare
4	Seánie Barry	Cork	1–6	9	Waterford
4	Eddie Keher	Kilkenny	0–9	9	Offaly
9	Paddy Molloy	Offaly	1–5	8	Carlow
9	Dick Shannon	Wexford	1–5	8	Dublin
9	Pat Cronin	Clare	1–5	8	Cork

=== Clean sheets ===
Rank	Goalkeeper	County	Clean sheets
1	Ollie Walsh	Kilkenny	1

== Sources ==
- Corry, Eoghan, The GAA Book of Lists (Hodder Headline Ireland, 2005).
- Donegan, Des, The Complete Handbook of Gaelic Games (DBA Publications Limited, 2005).
- Nolan, Pat, Flashbacks: A Half Century of Cork Hurling (The Collins Press, 2000).
