= Colm Sheehan =

Irish hurler

Personal information
- Native name: Colm Ó Síocháin (Irish)
- Born: 9 September 1941 (age 85) Ovens, County Cork, Ireland
- Height: 5 ft 9 in (175 cm)

Sport
- Sport: Hurling
- Position: Full-forward
Clubs
- Years: Club
- Éire Óg; Muskerry
Club titles
- Cork titles: 0
Inter-county*
Years	County	Apps (scores)
1965-1968	Cork	9 (5-05)
Inter-county titles
- Munster titles: 1
- All-Irelands: 1
- NHL: 0
- *Inter County team apps and scores correct as of 13:57, 9 April 2015.

Colm Sheehan (born 9 September 1941) was an Irish hurler. He played for club side Éire Óg, divisional side Muskerry and was the full-forward on the Cork senior hurling team that won the 1966 All-Ireland Championship.

Sheehan's club career with Éire Óg lasted for over twenty years and spanned three decades. During that time, he won Cork Junior Championship medals in 1962 and 1977, while he also played for divisional side Muskerry.

Sheehan made his first appearance for the Cork senior hurling team during the 1965 Munster Championship, having earlier played for the county in the minor, junior and intermediate grades. In 1966 he scored a hat-trick of goals in the final when Cork won their first All-Ireland Championship in 12 years, having earlier won the Munster Championship. Sheehan ended his inter-county career with the Cork intermediate team in 1968.

His grandnephew, Ciarán Sheehan, is also an All-Ireland medal-winner with Cork senior football team.

== Playing career ==
=== Club ===
Sheehan played his club hurling with his local Éire Óg side. In 1960, he was barely out of the minor ranks when he captured a Mid-Cork junior championship title following an eight-point win over Ballincollig. It was the first of three divisional titles in-a-row for Sheehan and Éire Óg as Cloughduv and Ballincollig were subsequently defeated in the finals of 1961 and 1962. The latter win saw Éire Óg reach the final of the county junior championship. East Cork champions Carrigtwohill were the opponents, and Éire Óg won on a score line of 3-4 to 2-4. This victory allowed Éire Óg to move into the county intermediate championship. In their very first year in the new grade, Sheehan's side captured the county intermediate league title.

Two years later, in 1965, Éire Óg reached the final of the intermediate championship. Glen Rovers won the final 3-8 to 3-5.

=== Inter-county ===
Sheehan first played for Cork as a member of the minor hurling team on 18 May 1958. He scored 1-1 on his debut in a 2-15 to 3-7 Munster quarter-final defeat by Clare. Sheehan's two seasons as a member of the minor team ended without success.

In 1963 Sheehan was back playing inter-county with Cork, this time as a member of the intermediate team. He won a Munster medal the following year after scoring 1-1 in Cork's 4-14 to 1-10 defeat of Galway. On 16 August 1964 Cork faced Wexford in the All-Ireland decider. A low-scoring 2-8 to 1-5 defeat was Sheehan's lot on that occasions.

Sheehan made his senior championship debut for Cork on 4 July 1965 in a 2-6 apiece Munster semi-final draw with Waterford.

The following year Sheehan was a regular member of the starting fifteen. A 4-9 to 2-9 defeat of Waterford in the provincial decider gave him a Munster medal. The subsequent All-Ireland final on 4 September 1966 pitted Kilkenny against Cork for the first time in nineteen years. Kilkenny were the favourites, however, a hat-trick of goals from Sheehan gave Cork a 3-9 to 1-10 victory over Kilkenny. Not only was it a first championship for Cork in twelve years, but it also gave Sheehan an All-Ireland medal.

Sheehan played no part in Cork's unsuccessful championship campaign in 1967 but was restored to full-forward the following year as Cork faced a 2-13 to 1-7 Munster final defeat by Tipperary. This defeat brought the curtain down on Sheehan's inter-county career.

== Career statistics ==
Team	Year	National League			Munster		All-Ireland		Total	
Team	Year	Division	Apps	Score	Apps	Score	Apps	Score	Apps	Score
Cork	1964-65	Division 1A	0	0-00	2	1-00	—		2	1-00
Cork	1965-66	Division 1B	6	3-03	4	0-03	1	3-00	11	6-06
Cork	1966-67	Division 1B	3	1-01	0	0-00	—		3	1-01
Cork	1967-68	Division 1B	4	1-02	2	1-02	—		6	2-04
Total			13	5-06	8	2-05	1	3-00	22	10-11

== Honours ==
Éire Óg

- Cork Junior Hurling Championship (2): 1962, 1977
- Mid Cork Junior A Hurling Championship (6): 1960, 1961, 1962, 1971, 1972, 1977

Cork

- All-Ireland Senior Hurling Championship (1): 1966
- Munster Senior Hurling Championship (1): 1966
