= Wattie Dunphy =

Irish hurler (1896–1973)

Walter Dunphy
Personal information
- Native name: Ualtar Ó Donnchaidh (Irish)
- Nickname: Wattie
- Born: 12 March 1896 Mooncoin, County Kilkenny, Ireland
- Died: 11 October 1973 (aged 77) Waterford, Ireland
- Occupation: Farmer
- Height: 6 ft 0 in (183 cm)

Sport
- Sport: Hurling
- Position: Centre-back
Club
- Years: Club
- 1914-1936: Mooncoin
Club titles
- Kilkenny titles: 6
Inter-county
- Years: County
- 1922-1930: Kilkenny
Inter-county titles
- Leinster titles: 4
- All-Irelands: 1
- NHL: 0

Walter 'Wattie' Dunphy (12 March 1896 – 11 October 1973) was an Irish hurler who played as a centre-back for the Kilkenny senior team.

Dunphy made his first appearance for the team during the 1922 championship and became a regular player over the next decade. During that time he won one All-Ireland winner's medal and four Leinster winner's medals. In 1922 Dunphy captained the team to the All-Ireland title.

At club level, Dunphy played with Mooncoin and won six county championship winners' medals in a career that spanned three decades.

Dunphy also won a Railway Cup winners' medal when he was chosen as captain on the first Leinster inter-provincial championship-winning team.

== Playing career ==
=== Club ===
Dunphy enjoyed a highly successful club hurling career with Mooncoin that spanned more than twenty years.

In 1916 he won his first club championship winners' medal following a victory in a replay over fierce rivals Tullaroan.

The club championship was severely hampered over the next six seasons, however, on its resumption Mooncoin faced defeat in the finals of 1923 and 1926.

Mooncoin emerged as a major force in club hurling in the late 1920s, winning three successive county championships between 1927 and 1929. Dunphy captained the side for the last two of these victories.

That great Mooncoin team began to break up by the 1930s, however, Dunphy continued to play for the team well into his forties. He captured two more club championship winners' medals in 1932 and 1936, a full twenty years since his first championship title. It was Mooncoin's last county title for almost thirty years.

=== Inter-county ===
Dunphy first came to prominence on the inter-county scene as a member of the Kilkenny senior team in the early 1920s. In 1922 he was captain of the side when he captured his first Leinster title following a defeat of Dublin. Dunphy later lead his men out in Croke Park for an All-Ireland final meeting with Tipperary. With three minutes left to play Tipp were leading by three points, however, Paddy Donoghue and Dick Tobin of Kilkeny scored two decisive goals to seal a 4-2 to 2-6 victory. Dunphy captured his sole All-Ireland medal that day and had the honour of accepting the trophy on behalf of his team. It would be forty-five years before Kilkenny would beat Tipp in the championship again.

Dunphy won a second Leinster medal in 1923, however, Galway defeated the reigning All-Ireland champions at the semi-final stage of the championship. 1925 saw Dunphy win a third provincial title, however, Galway put an end to Kilkenny’s championship hopes at the All-Ireland semi-final stage once again. In 1926 Kilkenny defeated Offaly to give Dunphy his fourth and final Leinster medal. He later lined out in a second All-Ireland final with Cork providing the opposition on this occasion. Snow covered Croke Park on the day of the final as Cork went on to win the game on as core line of 4-6 to 2-0. Dunphy’s involvement with the Kilkenny team ended in 1930.

=== Inter-provincial ===
Dunphy also lined out for Leinster in the inter-provincial hurling competition. In 1927 he captained Leinster to a 1-11 to 2-6 victory over Munster in the inaugural final of the Railway Cup. That game is remembered as one of the finest contests in the history of hurling. Dunphy also lined out for Leinster in 1928 and 1930; however, victory went to Munster on both occasions.

== Personal life and death ==
Dunphy was born in Luffany, Mooncoin, County Kilkenny, the second of ten children of Richard and Eliza (née Hennebery). He received a national school education locally, however, like many of his contemporaries he later left school to work on the family farm. Dunphy and his brothers all shared a passion for hurling and many lined out for both club and county: Joe, who before entering the priesthood played for Kilkenny in the late 1920s; Eddie, who played in the All-Ireland finals of 1922 and 1926; William, who was a substitute on the defeated All-Ireland team of 1935 and Richard, whose hurling was confined to his club. Two of Dunphy’s nephews later lined out for their native-county of Kilkenny. Dick Dunphy was the goalkeeping understudy to the legendary Ollie Walsh throughout the 1960s while Joe Dunphy Jnr. captained Kilkenny to back-to-back All-Ireland titles at minor level in 1961 and 1962 before later lining out at senior level. Dunphy married Johanna Dalton in November 1926 in Kilmacow.

Dunphy, aged 77, died on 11 October 1973 at the County and City Infirmary in Waterford.

Sporting positions
Preceded by Dick Grace	Kilkenny Senior Hurling Captain; 1922-1923	Succeeded by
Preceded by	Kilkenny Senior Hurling Captain; 1929	Succeeded by
Achievements
Preceded by Bob McConkey (Limerick)	All-Ireland Senior Hurling Final winning captain 1922	Succeeded by Mick Kenny (Galway)
Preceded by Newly created competition	Railway Cup Hurling Final winning captain 1927	Succeeded by Seán Óg Murphy (Munster)
