= Mooncoin =

Village in County Kilkenny, Ireland

Mooncoin Móin Choinn (Irish)
- Village
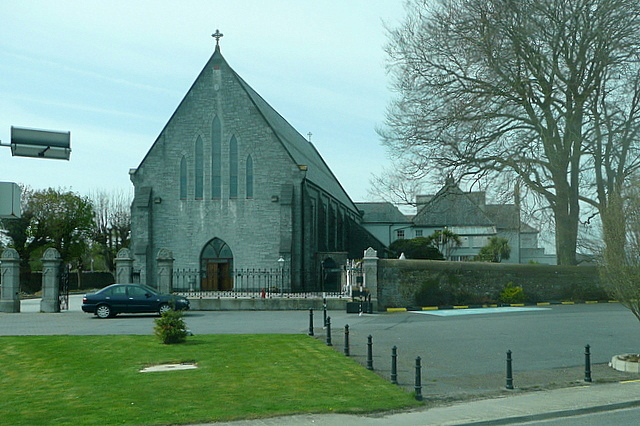
- Church at Mooncoin

- Location in Ireland
- Coordinates: 52°17′44″N 7°15′34″W
- Country: Ireland
- Province: Leinster
- County: County Kilkenny
- Barony: Iverk

Government
  - Type: County Council
  - Body: Kilkenny CountyCouncil
  - Dáil constituency: Carlow–Kilkenny
  - European Parliament: Ireland South
- Elevation: 25 m (82 ft)

Population (2016)
  - Total: 1,175
- Time zone: UTC±00:00 (GMT)
- Irish Grid Reference: S 503 162

Mooncoin (Irish: Móin Choinn, meaning 'Coyne's Bogland') is an urban area in County Kilkenny, in Ireland. The population was 1,175 in 2016. Historically part of the Gaelic kingdom of Osraige, today it is in the far south of the county of Kilkenny, located in the valley of the River Suir. It is surrounded by the uplands of the Slievenamon and Comeragh Mountains, just 10 kilometres (6.2 mi) north of Waterford City along the N24 national primary road (Waterford to Limerick), and it is 48 kilometres (30 mi) south of Kilkenny.

The village's name derives from an anglicized version of the Irish "Móin Choinn" which means "Coyne's Bogland". The song "The Rose of Mooncoin" by poet Watt Murphy has been adopted as the Kilkenny GAA anthem. The village has continually received high scores in the Tidy Towns competition.

== Etymology ==
While William Carrigan recorded the meaning as unknown, according to O'Kelly 1969 the village's name derives from an anglicized version of the Irish "Móin Choinn", with "móin" meaning "bogland" and the "coine" suffix meaning "Coyne" or "Choinn", so, translated, it is "Coyne's Bogland". The Grant family, including Coyne Grant, were property owners in the area. Recorded as "Moincoin" in a ballad about the battle of Carrickshock, called "Carraig Seac" and made famous by the song 'The Rose of Mooncoin'. Mooncoin gives its name to a townland, and the Catholic parish of Mooncoin.

== Geography ==
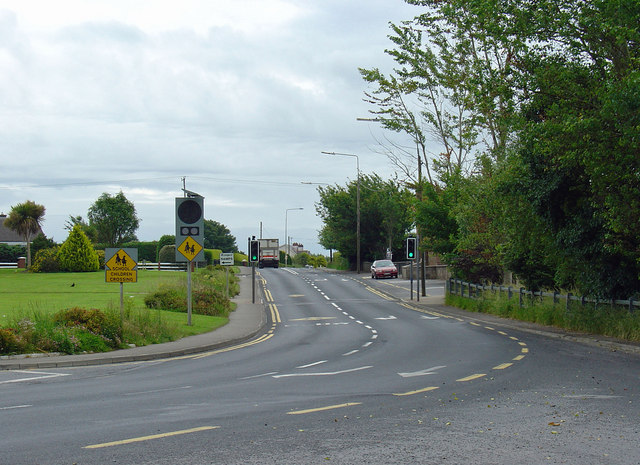
Mooncoin, County Kilkenny

Historical population
| Year | Pop. | ±% |
|---|---|---|
| 1837 | 495 | — |
| 1961 | 507 | +2.4% |
| 1966 | 505 | −0.4% |
| 1971 | 413 | −18.2% |
| 1979 | 684 | +65.6% |
| 1981 | 806 | +17.8% |
| 1986 | 868 | +7.7% |
| 1991 | 810 | −6.7% |
| 1996 | 855 | +5.6% |
| 2002 | 854 | −0.1% |
| 2011 | 1,002 | +17.3% |
| 2016 | 1,175 | +17.3% |

Mooncoin is situated in the Suir Valley, at the south of County Kilkenny in the province of Leinster in the south-east of Ireland. The linear village, which lacks a traditional village centre, stretches along the N24 national primary road with little development north and south. It is 6 kilometres (3.7 mi) from Waterford City and 48 kilometres (30 mi) south of the county town, Kilkenny. Located in the barony of Iverk, Mooncoin is in the civil parishes of Pollrone, Rathkieran, and Ballytarsney.

The population in the 2011 census was 1,166, of which the majority (776) lived in the electoral division of Pollrone, and the remaining 390 in the Portnascully electoral division. The village includes shops, traditional cottages, large private dwellings, and a parish hall. The main street lies between the two crossroads, the western end includes the church, convent, and school. At the eastern end is a number of buildings in their own grounds, including the two schools. There are two primary schools, one for boys and one for girls, in Mooncoin along with a secondary school. To the north of the village is the Waterford-Limerick railway line.

The continued growth in the population supports a number of businesses. There are two pubs (reduced from three after Howleys closed), three convenience stores, a pharmacy, a bakery, a hairdresser, and two takeaways. There is a 24-hour petrol station on the Waterford road side of the village.

== History ==
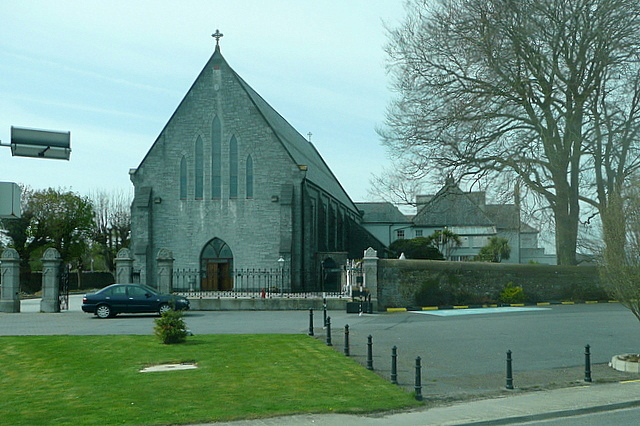
Mooncoin Church

Historically part of the Gaelic kingdom of Osraige. Prior to the Cromwellian conquest of Ireland, Coyne Grant and the Grant family were property owners in Pollrone, Dungooly and Ballynabooly. Following the construction of a new road, Mooncoin developed in the eighteenth and nineteenth centuries.

Mooncoin was the head of a Roman Catholic union or district, comprising the parishes of Rathkyran, Aglishmartin, Portnescully, Poleroan, Clonmore, Ballytarsna, Tubrid, and part of Burnchurch. The parish of Mooncoin has three churches – the main parish church in Mooncoin and two smaller churches in Killinaspick and Carrigeen.

In 1829, the Parish Priest, Rev. Nicholas Carroll, bought the Presentation Sisters a house in the centre of the village. They began teaching, and by 1842, Mooncoin had a girls' school with 200 pupils. Samuel Lewis' (1837) in his Topographical Dictionary of Ireland, described it as "a village and extra-parochial place" and "containing 102 houses and 495 inhabitants". The single cell church of the Assumption is Church was built in 1869, and in 1871 the Convent school was built next to the Church.

== Culture ==
=== Mooncoin in song ===
Mooncoin has been made famous by the song 'The Rose of Mooncoin', which has been adopted as the Kilkenny GAA (Gaelic Athletic Association) anthem by Paddy Grace. This is an apt acknowledgement of the village, as Mooncoin (along with Tullaroan) was one of the leading hurling teams in the country in the early years of the Gaelic Athletic Association.

The song was written in the 1800s by a local schoolteacher and poet named Watt Murphy, who met and gradually fell in love with a local girl called Elizabeth, also known as Molly. Elizabeth was just 20 years old, and Watt was then 56, but the difference in age was of no consequence to either of them. Both were intellectuals, and they would often stroll along the banks of the river Suir, composing and reciting poetry. However, Elizabeth's father, who was the local vicar, did not approve of their relationship, and she was sent away to England. Watt was brokenhearted at the loss of his beloved lady and wrote this song in her memory.

"How sweet 'tis to roam by the sunny Suir stream,
And hear the dove's coo 'neath the morning's sunbeam.
Where the thrush and the robin their sweet notes combine
On the banks of the Suir that flows down by Mooncoin.

Flow on, lovely river, flow gently along.
By your waters so sweet sounds the lark's merry song.
On your green banks I'll wander where first I did join
With you, lovely Molly, the Rose of Mooncoin.

Oh Molly, dear Molly, it breaks my fond heart,
To know that we two for ever must part
I will think of you, Molly, while sun and moon shines
On the banks of the Suir that flows down by Mooncoin..."

== Sport ==
=== GAA ===
Mooncoin have been County Kilkenny Senior Hurling Champions twelve times, 1888, 1900, 1906, 1908, 1913, 1916, 1927, 1928, 1929, 1932, 1936 and 1965. They were also Senior County Gaelic football Champions in 1886, beating James Stephens (The Village) in a replay. The most famous and successful GAA player in Mooncoin's history was Richard 'Drug' Walsh (1878–1958). He won 7 all Ireland medals with Kilkenny and famously captained Kilkenny to three all Ireland finals (1907, 1909, 1913). Only two other people in the history of hurling have achieved this same feat: Christy Ring of Cork and Mikey Maher of Tipperary in the 1890s. The club won its first Club All-Ireland hurling title in 2022 after defeating Cork's Ballygiblin in Croke Park.

=== Football ===
Mooncoin Celtic Football Club is located in the village.

== Notable people ==
- Rev. James B. Dollard ("Father Dollard") (1872–1946) was a Roman Catholic parish priest and noted poet.
- William Dollard (1789–1851) was the first bishop of the Roman Catholic Diocese of Saint John in Canada.
- Darren Holden, vocalist, musician and member of The High Kings.
- Walter McDonald (1854–1920), priest, theologian and professor.
- Vicky Phelan (1974–2022), advocate for women's health.
- John Walsh (1830–1898), Bishop of the Archdiocese of Toronto (1888–1898).

== See also ==
- List of towns and villages in Ireland
- List of urban areas in Ireland
