= Mooncoin GAA =

Gaelic games club in County Kilkenny, Ireland

Mooncoin
- Móin Choinn
- Founded: 1886
- County: Kilkenny
- Colours
- Grounds: Mooncoin GAA Complex

Playing kits
Standard colours

Senior Club Championships
	All Ireland	Leinster champions	Kilkenny champions
Football:	0	0	1
Hurling:	0	0	12
Camogie:	0	0	1

Mooncoin GAA Club is a Gaelic Athletic Association club in Mooncoin, County Kilkenny, Ireland. The club is affiliated to the Kilkenny County Board and fields teams in both hurling and Gaelic football.

== History ==
Located in the town of Mooncoin, about 10km from Waterford, Mooncoin GAA Club was founded in January 1886. The new club became one of the dominant forces in the Kilkenny SHC in the early years of the competition and developed a strong rivalry with Tullaroan.

After losing to Tullaroan in the inaugural Kilkenny SHC final in 1887, Mooncoin claimed their first title in 1888. The club subsequently won the Leinster SHC as the Kilkenny representatives. Mooncoin won five Kilkenny SHC titles in the period between 1900 and 1916, with a team featuring Dick Doherty, Dick Doyle, Pat Fielding and Dick Walsh.

After an 11-year lapse, Mooncoin secured their seventh Kilkenny SHC title when, in 1927, they beat James Stephens in the final. They retained the title in 1928 and 1929, when Wattie Dunphy captained the side. Mooncoin claimed further titles in 1932 and 1936. A long period without success followed, however, Mooncoin claimed their 12th and final Kilkenny SHC title after a 2–08 to 1–08 defeat of Bennettsbridge in 1965.

A period of decline followed, with Mooncoin eventually finding themselvels in the junior grade. In spite of this, the club claimed a Kilkenny SFC title in 1986. Mooncoin later won two Leinster Club JHC titles, before a 0-22 to 1-18 defeat of Ballygiblin in the 2022 All-Ireland Club JHC final.

== Honours ==
- Leinster Senior Hurling Championship (1): 1888
- Kilkenny Senior Hurling Championship (12): 1888, 1900, 1906, 1908, 1913, 1916, 1927, 1928, 1929, 1932, 1936, 1965
- Kilkenny Senior Camogie Championship: (1) 1959
- Kilkenny Senior Football Championship (1): 1986
- Kilkenny Intermediate Hurling Championship (2): 1990, 1994
- All-Ireland Junior Club Hurling Championship (1): 2022
- Leinster Junior Club Hurling Championship (2) 2016, 2022
- Kilkenny Junior Hurling Championship (7): 1908 (as Suirside Rovers), 1920, 1937, 1942, 1961, 2016, 2021
- Kilkenny Under-21 Hurling Championship (2): 1983, 2010
- Kilkenny Minor Hurling Championship (8): 1933, 1958, 1960, 1961, 1962, 1964, 1979, 2018

== Notable players ==
- Eddie Doyle: All-Ireland Senior Hurling Championship-winning captain (1933)
- Wattie Dunphy: All-Ireland Senior Hurling Championship-winning captain (1922)
- Dick Walsh: All-Ireland Senior Hurling Championship-winning captain (1907, 1909, 1913)
